= List of American films of 1988 =

This is a list of American films released in 1988.

== Box office ==
The highest-grossing American films released in 1988, by domestic box office gross revenue, are as follows:

Highest-grossing films of 1988
Rank	Title	Distributor	Domestic gross
1	Rain Man	MGM	$172,825,435
2	Who Framed Roger Rabbit	Buena Vista	$156,452,370
3	Coming to America	Paramount	$128,152,301
4	Big	20th Century Fox	$114,968,774
5	Twins	Universal	$111,938,388
6	Crocodile Dundee II	Paramount	$109,306,210
7	Die Hard	20th Century Fox	$83,008,852
8	The Naked Gun: From the Files of Police Squad!	Paramount	$78,756,177
9	Cocktail	Buena Vista	$78,222,753
10	Beetlejuice	Geffen (through Warner Bros.)	$73,707,461

== January–March ==
Opening		Title	Production company	Cast and crew	Ref.
J A N U A R Y	8	Cop	Atlantic Releasing Corporation	James B. Harris (director/screenplay); James Woods, Lesley Ann Warren, Charles Durning, Charles Haid, Raymond J. Barry, Randi Brooks, Steven Lambert, Christopher Wynne, Jan McGill, Vicki Wauchope, Melinda Lynch, John Petievich, Dennis Stewart, Annie McEnroe	
J A N U A R Y	15	The Couch Trip	Orion Pictures	Michael Ritchie (director); Steven Kampmann, William Porter, Sean Stein, Walter Bernstein (screenplay); Dan Aykroyd, Walter Matthau, Charles Grodin, Donna Dixon, Richard Romanus, Mary Gross, David Clennon, Scott Thomson, David Wohl, Arye Gross, Victoria Jackson, Chevy Chase	
J A N U A R Y	15	For Keeps	Tri-Star Pictures	John G. Avildsen (director); Denise DeClue, Tim Kazurinsky (screenplay); Molly Ringwald, Randall Batinkoff, Kenneth Mars, Miriam Flynn, Conchata Ferrell, Sharon Brown, John Zarchen, Pauly Shore, Michelle Downey, Patricia Barry, Janet MacLachlan, Jaclyn Bernstein, Matthew Licht, Renee Estevez, Darcy DeMoss	
J A N U A R Y	22	The Telephone	New World Pictures	Rip Torn (director); Terry Southern, Harry Nilsson (screenplay); Whoopi Goldberg, Severn Darden, Elliott Gould, John Heard, Amy Wright	
J A N U A R Y	22	Braddock: Missing in Action III	Cannon Films	Aaron Norris (director); James Bruner, Chuck Norris (screenplay); Chuck Norris, Aki Aleong, Keith David, Yehuda Efroni, Roland Harrah III, Miki Kim	
J A N U A R Y	29	Biggles: Adventures in Time	New Century/Vista Film Co.	John Hough (director); John Groves, Kent Walwin (screenplay); Neil Dickson, Alex Hyde-White, Fiona Hutchison, Peter Cushing, Marcus Gilbert, William Hootkins, Alan Polonsky, Francesca Gonshaw, Michael Siberry, James Saxon, Daniel Flynn	
F E B R U A R Y	5	The Serpent and the Rainbow	Universal Pictures	Wes Craven (director); Richard Maxwell (screenplay); Bill Pullman, Cathy Tyson, Zakes Mokae, Paul Winfield, Brent Jennings, Conrad Roberts, Aleta Mitchell, Badja Djola, Michael Gough, Paul Guilfoyle, Dey Young, William Newman, Francis Guinan, Luis Tavare Pesquera, Jaime Pina Gautier, Philogen Thomas, Evencio Mosquera Slaco	
F E B R U A R Y	5	She's Having a Baby	Paramount Pictures / Hughes Entertainment	John Hughes (director/screenplay); Kevin Bacon, Elizabeth McGovern, Alec Baldwin, William Windom, Holland Taylor, Cathryn Damon, John Ashton, James Ray, Bill Irwin, Paul Gleason, Dennis Dugan, Larry Hankin, Edie McClurg, Nancy Lenehan, Michael Keaton, Woody Harrelson, Matthew Broderick	
F E B R U A R Y	5	The Unbearable Lightness of Being	Orion Pictures	Philip Kaufman (director/screenplay); Jean-Claude Carrière (screenplay); Daniel Day-Lewis, Juliette Binoche, Lena Olin, Derek de Lint, Erland Josephson, Pavel Landovský, Donald Moffat, Tomek Bork, Daniel Olbrychski, Stellan Skarsgård, Anne Lonnberg	
F E B R U A R Y	12	Action Jackson	Lorimar Film Entertainment	Craig R. Baxley (director); Robert Reneau (screenplay); Carl Weathers, Craig T. Nelson, Vanity, Sharon Stone, Bill Duke, Robert Davi, Jack Thibeau, Armelia McQueen, Stan Foster, Roger Aaron Brown, Thomas F. Wilson, Edgar Small, Chino 'Fats' Williams, Prince A. Hughes, Frank McCarthy, De'Voreaux White, Dennis Hayden, David Glen Eisley, Bob Minor, David Effron, Brian Libby, Nicholas Worth, Branscombe Richmond, Miguel Nunez, Charles Meshack, Al Leong, Ed O'Ross, Mary Ellen Trainor, Jim Haynie, Ivor Barry, Michael McManus, Sonny Landham	
F E B R U A R Y	12	Satisfaction	20th Century Fox / NBC Productions	Joan Freeman (director); Charles Purpura (screenplay); Justine Bateman, Liam Neeson, Trini Alvarado, Julia Roberts, Scott Coffey, Britta Phillips, Debbie Harry, Chris Nash, Michael DeLorenzo, Tom O'Brien, Peter Craig, Steve Cropper	
F E B R U A R Y	12	School Daze	Columbia Pictures / 40 Acres and a Mule Filmworks	Spike Lee (director/screenplay); Larry Fishburne, Giancarlo Esposito, Tisha Campbell, Kyme, Joe Seneca, Art Evans, Ellen Holly, Ossie Davis, Bill Nunn, Branford Marsalis, Kadeem Hardison, Spike Lee, Darryl M. Bell, Joie Lee, Alva Rogers, Jasmine Guy, Samuel L. Jackson, Roger Guenveur Smith, Cinqué Lee, Cylk Cozart, Dominic Hoffman, Kirk Taylor, Erik Dellums, Rusty Cundieff, Leonard L. Thomas, Tyra Ferrell, Gregg Burge, Kasi Lemmons, A.J. Johnson, Cassi Davis, Phyllis Hyman	
F E B R U A R Y	12	Shoot to Kill	Touchstone Pictures	Roger Spottiswoode (director); Harv Zimmel, Michael Burton, Daniel Petrie Jr. (screenplay); Sidney Poitier, Tom Berenger, Kirstie Alley, Andrew Robinson, Clancy Brown, Richard Masur, William S. Taylor, Frederick Coffin, Ken Camroux, Fred Henderson, Samuel Hiona, Les Lannom, Robert Lesser, Michael MacRae, Walter Marsh, Janet Rotblatt, Kevin Scannell, Frank C. Turner	
F E B R U A R Y	13	The In Crowd	Orion Pictures	Mark Rosenthal (director/screenplay); Lawrence Konner (screenplay); Donovan Leitch, Jennifer Runyon, Joe Pantoliano, Peter Boyle, Scott Plank, Bruce Kirby, Charlotte d'Amboise, Page Hannah, Mark Soper, Wendy Gazelle, Sean Gregory Sullivan, Freddie Ganno, Richard Schave, Matthew Nasatir, John R. Russell, Elliott Alexander	
F E B R U A R Y	20	Baja Oklahoma	HBO Pictures / Rastar Productions / Warner Bros. Television Distribution	Bobby Roth (director/screenplay); Dan Jenkins (screenplay); Lesley Ann Warren, Peter Coyote, Swoosie Kurtz, Julia Roberts, Billy Vera, Anthony Zerbe, William Forsythe, Willie Nelson, Bruce Abbott, Carmen Argenziano, Paul Bartel, Jordan Charney, Carole Raphaelle Davis, Emmylou Harris, John M. Jackson, Alice Krige, John Mayall, Rob Nilsson, Walter Olkewicz, Cyril O'Reilly, Linda Dona, Rhonda Dotson, Kit McDonough, Annie O'Neill, Dennis Redfield, Susannah Woodside	
F E B R U A R Y	26	Alien from L.A.	The Cannon Group / Golan-Globus Productions	Albert Pyun (director/screenplay); Regina Davis, Debra Ricci (screenplay); Kathy Ireland, William R. Moses, Richard Haines, Don Michael Paul, Thom Mathews, Linda Kerridge, Deep Roy, Janie Du Plessis, Simon Poland, Kristen Trucksess, Lochner De Kock	
F E B R U A R Y	26	Bloodsport	Cannon Film Distributors	Newt Arnold (director); Christopher Cosby, Mel Friedman, Sheldon Lettich (screenplay); Jean-Claude Van Damme, Donald Gibb, Leah Ayres, Norman Burton, Roy Chiao, Forest Whitaker, Bolo Yeung, Ken Siu, Michel Qissi, Philip Chan	
F E B R U A R Y	26	Frantic	Warner Bros. Pictures	Roman Polanski (director/screenplay); Gerard Brach, Robert Towne (screenplay); Harrison Ford, Betty Buckley, John Mahoney, Emmanuelle Seigner, Gerard Klein, Jacques Ciron, Dominique Pinon, Yves Rénier, Robert M. Ground, Jimmie Ray Weeks, Thomas M. Pollard, Marcel Bluwal, Patrick Floersheim, Yorgo Voyagis, David Huddleston, Alexandra Stewart, Artus de Penguern, Roman Polanski	
F E B R U A R Y	26	Hairspray	New Line Cinema	John Waters (director/screenplay); Sonny Bono, Ruth Brown, Divine, Debbie Harry, Ricki Lake, Jerry Stiller, Ric Ocasek, Pia Zadora, Leslie Ann Powers, Colleen Fitzpatrick, Michael St. Gerard, Clayton Prince, Cyrkle Milbourne, Shawn Thompson, Mink Stole, Joann Havrilla, Doug Roberts, Alan J. Wendi, Toussaint McCall, John Waters, Josh Charles, Jason Downs, Holter Graham	
F E B R U A R Y	26	A Night in the Life of Jimmy Reardon	20th Century Fox / Island Pictures	William Richert (director/screenplay); River Phoenix, Ann Magnuson, Meredith Salenger, Ione Skye, Louanne, Matthew L. Perry, Paul Koslo, Jane Hallaren, Jason Court, James Deuter, Alison Goldfrapp, Johnny Galecki, Alan Goldsher, William Richert, Marji Banks, Margaret Moore, Kamie Harper	
M A R C H	2	Doom Asylum	Filmworld / Academy Entertainment	Richard Friedman (director); Rick Marx (screenplay); Patty Mullen, Ruth Collins, Kristin Davis, William Hay, Kenny L. Price, Harrison White, Dawn Alvan, Michael Rogen	
M A R C H	4	And God Created Woman	Vestron Pictures	Roger Vadim (director); R.J. Stewart (screenplay); Rebecca De Mornay, Vincent Spano, Frank Langella, Donovan Leitch, Judith Chapman, Jamie McEnnan, Benjamin Mouton, Dave Shelley, Einstein Brown, David Lopez, Thelma Houston	
M A R C H	4	Babette's Feast	Orion Classics	Gabriel Axel (director/screenplay); Stéphane Audran, Birgitte Federspiel, Bodil Kjer, Jarl Kulle, Jean-Philippe Lafont, Vibeke Hastrup, Tina Kiberg, Bibi Andersson, Bendt Rothe, Lisbeth Movin, Preben Lerdorff Rye, Ebbe Rode, Else Petersen, Axel Strøbye, Ghita Nørby, Hanne Stensgaard, Gudmar Wivesson, Pouel Kern, Cay Kristiansen, Asta Esper Andersen, Ebba With, Finn Nielsen	
M A R C H	4	Moving	Warner Bros. Pictures	Alan Metter (director); Andy Breckman (screenplay); Richard Pryor, Beverly Todd, Dave Thomas, Dana Carvey, Randy Quaid, Stacey Dash, Gordon Jump, King Kong Bundy, Ji-Tu Cumbuka, Robert LaSardo, Morris Day, Rodney Dangerfield	
M A R C H	4	Prison	Empire Pictures	Renny Harlin (director); Irwin Yablans, C. Courtney Joyner (screenplay); Lane Smith, Viggo Mortensen, Chelsea Field, Lincoln Kilpatrick, André De Shields, Arlen Dean Snyder, Hal Landon Jr., Matt Kanen, Tom Everett, Ivan Kane, Tommy Lister, Stephen Little, Mickey Yablans, Larry "Flash" Jenkins, Kane Hodder	
M A R C H	4	Pulse	Columbia Pictures	Paul Golding (director/screenplay); Cliff De Young, Roxanne Hart, Joey Lawrence, Matthew Lawrence, Charles Tyner, Dennis Redfield, Robert Romanus, Myron Healey, Michael Rider, Jean Sincere, Terry Beaver, Greg Norberg, Tim Russ	
M A R C H	4	Switching Channels	Tri-Star Pictures	Ted Kotcheff (director); Jonathan Reynolds (screenplay); Kathleen Turner, Burt Reynolds, Christopher Reeve, Ned Beatty, Henry Gibson, George Newbern, Al Waxman, Ken James, Barry Flatman, Anthony Sherwood, Joe Silver, Tony Rosato, Jackie Richardson, Philip Akin, Laura Robinson, Fiona Reid, Jack Duffy, Charles Kimbrough	
M A R C H	11	Masquerade	Metro-Goldwyn-Mayer	Bob Swaim (director); Dick Wolf (screenplay); Rob Lowe, Meg Tilly, Kim Cattrall, Doug Savant, John Glover, Dana Delany, Bernie McInerney, Maeve McGuire, Boz Scaggs, Dick Wolf, Erik Holland, Brian Davies, Barton Heyman, Bill Lopatto, Pirie MacDonald, Ira Wheeler, Timothy Langfield, Karen McLaughlin, Nada Rowand, Edwin Bordo, Bruce Tuthill, James Caulfield, Henry Ravelo	
M A R C H	11	Off Limits	20th Century Fox	Christopher Crowe (director/screenplay); Jack Thibeau (screenplay); Willem Dafoe, Gregory Hines, Fred Ward, Amanda Pays, Scott Glenn, Lim Kay Tong, David Alan Grier, Keith David, Raymond O'Connor, Richard Brooks, Thuy Ann Luu, Richard Lee Reed, Woody Brown	
M A R C H	11	Stand and Deliver	Warner Bros. Pictures	Ramón Menéndez (director/screenplay); Tom Musca (screenplay); Edward James Olmos, Lou Diamond Phillips, Rosanna DeSoto, Andy García, Ingrid Oliu, Carmen Argenziano, Vanessa Marquez, Lydia Nicole, James Victor, Estelle Harris, Virginia Paris, Will Gotay	
M A R C H	11	Vice Versa	Columbia Pictures	Brian Gilbert (director); Dick Clement, Ian La Frenais (screenplay); Judge Reinhold, Fred Savage, Corinne Bohrer, Swoosie Kurtz, David Proval, Jane Kaczmarek, William Prince, Beverly Archer, Richard Kind, Elya Baskin, James Hong, Ajay Naidu, Jane Lynch, Gloria Gifford, Harry Murphy, Kevin O'Rourke, Chip Lucia, Jason Late, P.J. Brown	
M A R C H	18	D.O.A.	Touchstone Pictures	Annabel Jankel, Rocky Morton (directors); Charles Edward Pogue (screenplay); Dennis Quaid, Meg Ryan, Daniel Stern, Charlotte Rampling, Jane Kaczmarek, Christopher Neame, Robin Johnson, Robert Knepper, Brion James, Jack Kehoe, Jay Patterson	
M A R C H	18	Little Nikita	Columbia Pictures	Richard Benjamin (director); Bo Goldman, John Hill (screenplay); Sidney Poitier, River Phoenix, Richard Jenkins, Caroline Kava, Richard Bradford, Richard Lynch, Loretta Devine, Lucy Deakins, Jerry Hardin, Ronald Guttman, Jacob Vargas, Brooke Theiss, Albert Fortell, Robert Madrid	
M A R C H	18	The Milagro Beanfield War	Universal Pictures	Robert Redford (director); John Nichols, David S. Ward (screenplay); Rubén Blades, Richard Bradford, Sônia Braga, Julie Carmen, James Gammon, Melanie Griffith, John Heard, Carlos Riquelme, Daniel Stern, Christopher Walken, Chick Vennera, Freddy Fender, Tony Genaro, Jerry Hardin	
M A R C H	18	Police Academy 5: Assignment Miami Beach	Warner Bros. Pictures	Alan Myerson (director); Stephen Curwick (screenplay); Bubba Smith, David Graf, Michael Winslow, Leslie Easterbrook, Marion Ramsey, Janet Jones, Lance Kinsey, Matt McCoy, G. W. Bailey, George Gaynes, Tab Thacker, George R. Robertson, René Auberjonois, Archie Hahn, James Hampton, Ed Kovens, Scott Weinger, Julio Oscar Mechoso, Joe Del Campo, Jerry O'Connell, Paul Maslansky, Graham Smith	
M A R C H	18	Pound Puppies and the Legend of Big Paw	Tri-Star Pictures / Carolco Pictures	Pierre DeCelles (director); Jim Carlson, Terrence McDonnell (screenplay); Brennan Howard, B. J. Ward, Nancy Cartwright, Tony Longo, Ruth Buzzi, Hal Rayle, Cathy Cavadini, Greg Berg, Susan Silo, Frank Welker, Ashley Hall, Mark Vieha, George Rose, Wayne Scherzer, Janice Kawaye, Joey Dedio, James Swodec	
M A R C H	18	Stars and Bars	Columbia Pictures	Pat O'Connor (director); William Boyd (screenplay); Daniel Day-Lewis, Harry Dean Stanton, Maury Chaykin, Joan Cusack, Keith David, Spalding Gray, Glenne Headly, Laurie Metcalf, Deirdre O'Connell, Will Patton, Martha Plimpton, Steven Wright	
M A R C H	20	Top Cat and the Beverly Hills Cats	Worldvision Enterprises / Hanna-Barbera Productions	Paul Sommer, Charles A. Nichols, Ray Patterson (directors); Barry Blitzer (screenplay); Arnold Stang, Avery Schreiber, Leo De Lyon, Marvin Kaplan, John Stephenson, Dick Erdman, Teresa Ganzel, Linda Gary, Kenneth Mars, Rob Paulsen, Henry Polic II, Frank Welker, Lilly Moon	
M A R C H	25	Biloxi Blues	Universal Pictures / Rastar	Mike Nichols (director); Neil Simon (screenplay); Matthew Broderick, Christopher Walken, Michael Dolan, Markus Flanagan, Matt Mulhern, Corey Parker, Casey Siemaszko, Penelope Ann Miller, Park Overall	
M A R C H	25	The Fox and the Hound (re-release)	Walt Disney Pictures	Ted Berman, Richard Rich, Art Stevens (directors); Mickey Rooney, Kurt Russell, Pearl Bailey, Jack Albertson, Sandy Duncan, Jeanette Nolan, Pat Buttram, John Fiedler, John McIntire, Dick Bakalyan, Paul Winchell, Keith Mitchell, Corey Feldman	
M A R C H	25	Johnny Be Good	Orion Pictures	Bud S. Smith (director); Steve Zacharias, Jeff Buhai, David Obst (screenplay); Anthony Michael Hall, Robert Downey Jr., Paul Gleason, Uma Thurman, Steve James, Seymour Cassel, Jennifer Tilly, Deborah May, Robert Downey Sr.	
M A R C H	25	A New Life	Paramount Pictures	Alan Alda (director/screenplay); Alan Alda, Ann-Margret, Hal Linden, John Shea, Veronica Hamel, Mary Kay Place, Beatrice Alda, David Eisner, Victoria Snow, Alec Mapa, Malcolm Stewart, Barry Flatman, Cynthia Belliveau, Michael Kirby, Celia Weston, Paul Hecht, Bill Irwin, Fiona Reid, Jackie Samuda, Deborah Theaker, John Kozak, Tim Koetting, Michelle Duquet, Laura Dickson	
M A R C H	26	The Tracker	HBO Pictures / ITC Entertainment	John Guillermin (director); Kevin Jarre (screenplay); Kris Kristofferson, Scott Wilson, Mark Moses, David Huddleston, John Quade, Don Swayze, Geoffrey Blake, Leon Rippy, Ernie Lively, Karen Kopins, Jeff Celentano, Brynn Thayer, Lois Geary, Celia Xavier, Jennifer Snyder, Jose Rey Toledo, Forrest Broadley, Jake Dengel, Stephen Parks	
M A R C H	30	Beetlejuice	The Geffen Company	Tim Burton (director); Michael McDowell, Warren Skaaren (screenplay); Michael Keaton, Alec Baldwin, Geena Davis, Jeffrey Jones, Catherine O'Hara, Winona Ryder, Sylvia Sidney, Robert Goulet, Dick Cavett, Glenn Shadix, Annie McEnroe, Maurice Page, Hugo Stanger, Rachel Mittleman, Patrice Martinez, Carmen Filpi, Susan Kellermann, Adelle Lutz, Duane Davis, Maree Cheatham, Tony Cox, Jack Angel, Judi M. Durand	

== April–June ==
Opening		Title	Production company	Cast and crew	Ref.
A P R I L	1	Bright Lights, Big City	United Artists	James Bridges (director); Jay McInerney (screenplay); Michael J. Fox, Kiefer Sutherland, Phoebe Cates, Dianne Wiest, Swoosie Kurtz, Frances Sternhagen, Tracy Pollan, John Houseman, Charlie Schlatter, David Warrilow, Alec Mapa, William Hickey, Gina Belafonte, Sam Robards, Jessica Lundy, Kelly Lynch, Annabelle Gurwitch, Russell Horton, Maria Pitillo, Susan Traylor, David Hyde Pierce, Peg Murray, Leigh French, Nicholas Guest, Fred Newman, Luisa Leschin, Anna Mathias, Tracy Newman, Reni Santoni, Wendy Schaal, Jonathan Stark, Claudette Wells, Dondre T. Whitfield, Jason Robards	
A P R I L	1	The Seventh Sign	Tri-Star Pictures	Carl Schultz (director); Clifford Green, Ellen Green (screenplay); Demi Moore, Michael Biehn, Peter Friedman, Jürgen Prochnow, Manny Jacobs, John Taylor	
A P R I L	8	18 Again!	New World Pictures	Paul Flaherty (director); Josh Goldstein, Jonathan Prince (screenplay); George Burns, Charlie Schlatter, Tony Roberts, Anita Morris, Red Buttons, Miriam Flynn, Pauly Shore, Jennifer Runyon, George DiCenzo, Bernard Fox, Kenneth Tigar, Anthony Starke, Emory Bass, Benny Baker, Hal Smith, Earl Boen, Kimberlin Brown, Karl Wiedergott, Pat Crawford Brown	
A P R I L	8	Above the Law	Warner Bros. Pictures	Andrew Davis (director/screenplay); Steven Pressfield, Ronald Shusett (screenplay); Steven Seagal, Pam Grier, Sharon Stone, Daniel Faraldo, Henry Silva, Ron Dean, Miguel Nino, Nicholas Kusenko, Joe V. Greco, Chelcie Ross, Gregory Alan Williams, Jack Wallace, Metta Davis, Joseph Kosala	
A P R I L	8	Bad Dreams	20th Century Fox	Andrew Fleming (director/screenplay); Steven E. de Souza (screenplay); Jennifer Rubin, Bruce Abbott, Richard Lynch, Dean Cameron, Harris Yulin, Susan Barnes, John Scott Clough, E.G. Daily, Damita Jo Freeman, Louis Giambalvo, Susan Ruttan, Sy Richardson, Missy Francis, Sheila Scott-Wilkenson, Ben Kronen	
A P R I L	15	Appointment with Death	Cannon Film Distributors	Michael Winner (director/screenplay); Anthony Shaffer, Peter Buckman (screenplay); Peter Ustinov, Lauren Bacall, Carrie Fisher, John Gielgud, Piper Laurie, Hayley Mills, Jenny Seagrove, David Soul, Nicholas Guest, Valerie Richards, John Terlesky, Amber Bezer, Douglas Sheldon, Mike Sarne, Michael Craig	
A P R I L	15	Brain Damage	Palisades Entertainment	Frank Henenlotter (director/screenplay); Rick Hearst, John Zacherle, Jennifer Lowry, Theo Barnes, Lucille Saint Peter, Kevin Van Hentenryck, Gordon MacDonald	
A P R I L	15	Colors	Orion Pictures	Dennis Hopper (director); Richard DiLello, Michael Schiffer (screenplay); Sean Penn, Robert Duvall, María Conchita Alonso, Randy Brooks, Don Cheadle, Glenn Plummer, Trinidad Silva, Grand L. Bush, Damon Wayans, Leon Robinson, Romeo De Lan, Gerardo Meija, Mario Lopez, Karla Montana, Sy Richardson, Courtney Gains, Sherman Augustus, Rudy Ramos, Lawrence Cook, R. D. Call, Clark Johnson, Jack Nance, David Raynr	
A P R I L	15	The Moderns	Nelson Entertainment	Alan Rudolph (director/screenplay); Jon Bradshaw (screenplay); Keith Carradine, Linda Fiorentino, Geneviève Bujold, Geraldine Chaplin, Wallace Shawn, Kevin J. O'Connor, John Lone, Charlélie Couture, Elsa Raven, Gailard Sartain, Brooke Smith, Timothy Webber, Normand Brathwaite, Michael Rudder, Paul Buissonneau, Flora Balzano, Stephanie Biddle, Ali Giron, Robert Gould, Antonia Dauphin, Véronique Bellegarde, Isabel Serra, Marthe Turgeon, Mance Edmond, Lenie Scoffié, Reynald Bouchard, Beverly Murray, Renée Lee	
A P R I L	15	Plain Clothes	Paramount Pictures	Martha Coolidge (director); Scott Frank (screenplay); Arliss Howard, Suzy Amis, Seymour Cassel, Diane Ladd, Robert Stack, Abe Vigoda, George Wendt, Larry Pine, Alexandra Powers, Peter Dobson, Harry Shearer, Loren Dean, Reginald VelJohnson, Max Perlich, Phoebe Augustine, Bridget Hoffman, David Tom	
A P R I L	15	Return to Snowy River	Walt Disney Pictures	Geoff Burrowes (director); John Dixon (screenplay); Tom Burlinson, Sigrid Thornton, Brian Dennehy, Nicholas Eadie, Bryan Marshall, Mark Hembrow, Rhys McConnochie, Peter Cummins, Cornelia Frances, Tony Barry, Wynn Roberts, Alec Wilson, Peter Browne, Alan Hopgood, Mark Pennell	
A P R I L	15	Zelly and Me	Columbia Pictures	Tina Rathborne (director/screenplay); Isabella Rossellini, Glynis Johns, Alexandra Johnes, David Lynch, Joe Morton	
A P R I L	22	The Blue Iguana	Paramount Pictures	John Lafia (director/screenplay); Dylan McDermott, Jessica Harper, James Russo, Pamela Gidley, Flea, Tovah Feldshuh, Dean Stockwell, John Durbin, Don Pedro Colley, Yano Anaya, Michele Seipp, Katia Schkolnik, Eliett, Pedro Altamirano, Benny Corral	
A P R I L	22	Casual Sex?	Universal Pictures	Geneviève Robert (director); Wendy Goldman, Judy Toll (screenplay); Lea Thompson, Victoria Jackson, Stephen Shellen, Jerry Levine, Mary Gross, Andrew Dice Clay, Bruce Abbott, Valerie Breiman, Peter Dvorsky, David Sergeant, Cynthia Phillips, Don Woodard, Danny Breen, Susan Ann Connor	
A P R I L	22	Lady in White	New Century Vista Film Company	Frank LaLoggia (director/screenplay): Lukas Haas, Len Cariou, Alex Rocco, Katherine Helmond, Jason Presson, Jared Rushton, Renata Vanni, Lucy Lee Flippin, Tom Bower, Sydney Lassick, Rose Weaver, Bruce Kirby, Frank LaLoggia, Henry Harris, Angelo Bertolini, Joelle Jacobi, Gregory Levinson, Karen Powell, Jack Andreozzi, Rita Zohar, Hal Bokar, Emily Tracy, Lisa Taylor	
A P R I L	22	Permanent Record	Paramount Pictures	Marisa Silver (director); Jarre Fees, Larry Ketron, Alice Liddle (screenplay); Alan Boyce, Pamela Gidley, Michelle Meyrink, Keanu Reeves, Jennifer Rubin, Barry Corbin, Kathy Baker, Richard Bradford, Michael Elgart, Dakin Matthews, Lou Reed	
A P R I L	22	Return of the Killer Tomatoes	New World Pictures	John De Bello (director/screenplay); Costa Dillon, J. Stephen Peace (screenplay); Anthony Starke, George Clooney, Karen Mistal, Steve Lundquist, John Astin, J. Stephen Peace, Michael Villani, Frank Davis, Harvey Weber, Charlie Jones, John De Bello, Ian Hutton, Rick Rockwell	
A P R I L	22	A Time of Destiny	Columbia Pictures / Nelson Entertainment	Gregory Nava (director/screenplay); Anna Thomas (screenplay); William Hurt, Timothy Hutton, Melissa Leo, Francisco Rabal, Concha Hidalgo, Stockard Channing, Megan Follows, Frederick Coffin, Peter Palmer, Kelly Pacheco	
A P R I L	22	Two Moon Junction	Lorimar Film Entertainment / The Samuel Goldwyn Company	Zalman King (director/screenplay); Sherilyn Fenn, Richard Tyson, Louise Fletcher, Burl Ives, Kristy McNichol, Martin Hewitt, Juanita Moore, Don Galloway, Millie Perkins, Milla Jovovich, Kerry Remsen, Herve Villechaize, Dabbs Greer	
A P R I L	22	The Unholy	Vestron Pictures	Camilo Vila (director); Philip Yordan, Fernando Fonseca (screenplay); Ben Cross, Ned Beatty, William Russ, Jill Carroll, Hal Holbrook, Trevor Howard, Claudia Robinson, Nicole Fortier, Peter Frechette, Earleen Carey, Lari White	
A P R I L	22	White Mischief	Columbia Pictures / Goldcrest Films / Nelson Entertainment	Michael Radford (director/screenplay); Jonathan Gems (screenplay); Greta Scacchi, Joss Ackland, Charles Dance, Sarah Miles, Geraldine Chaplin, Ray McAnally, Murray Head, John Hurt, Trevor Howard, Susan Fleetwood, Catherine Neilson, Hugh Grant, Alan Dobie, Jacqueline Pearce	
A P R I L	29	Critters 2: The Main Course	New Line Cinema	Mick Garris (director/screenplay); David Twohy (screenplay); Scott Grimes, Liane Curtis, Don Keith Opper, Barry Corbin, Terrence Mann, Tom Hodges, Sam Anderson, Lindsay Parker, Herta Ware, Lin Shaye, Roxanne Kernohan, Douglas Rowe, Eddie Deezen, Randy Spears, Tom McLoughlin, Montrose Hagins, William Hanna, Mick Garris	
A P R I L	29	Da	FilmDallas Pictures	Matt Clark (director); Hugh Leonard (screenplay); Barnard Hughes, Martin Sheen, William Hickey, Hugh O'Conor, Joan O'Hara, Doreen Hepburn, Karl Hayden, Ingrid Craigie, Jill Doyle, Peter Hanly	
A P R I L	29	Powaqqatsi	The Cannon Group	Godfrey Reggio (director)	
A P R I L	29	Sunset	Tri-Star Pictures	Blake Edwards (director/screenplay); Bruce Willis, James Garner, Mariel Hemingway, Kathleen Quinlan, Jennifer Edwards, Malcolm McDowell, Patricia Hodge, Richard Bradford, M. Emmet Walsh, Joe Dallesandro, Andreas Katsulas, Dann Florek, Michael C. Gwynne, Dermot Mulroney, Peter Jason, Miranda Garrison, Liz Torres, Cástulo Guerra, Dakin Matthews, Vernon Wells, John Dennis Johnston, Richard Fancy, Glenn Shadix, Maureen Teefy, Arnold Johnson, Bing Russell, Luis Contreras, Charles Noland, Rod McCary, Jeris Lee Poindexter, Grant Heslov, Beverly Leech, Marilyn Michaels, Bill Marcus, Jeffrey Briar, Bevis Faversham, John Fountain	
M A Y	4	The House on Carroll Street	Orion Pictures	Peter Yates (director); Walter Bernstein (screenplay); Kelly McGillis, Jeff Daniels, Mandy Patinkin, Jessica Tandy, Jonathan Hogan, Remak Ramsay, Kenneth Welsh, Christopher Buchholz, Charles McCaughan, Randle Mell, Paul Sparer, Frederick Rolf, Anna Berger, Trey Wilson, Jamey Sheridan, Boris Leskin, James Rebhorn, Maeve McGuire, Gregory Jbara, James Lew, Alice Drummond, Tony Carreiro, Robert Stanton, Brian Davies, Bill Moor, Cliff Cudney, Alexis Yulin, Howard Sherman, John Randolph Jones	
M A Y	6	Dead Heat	New World Pictures	Mark Goldblatt (director); Terry Black (screenplay); Treat Williams, Joe Piscopo, Darren McGavin, Lindsay Frost, Vincent Price, Clare Kirkconnell, Keye Luke, Robert Picardo, Mel Stewart, Professor Toru Tanaka, Martha Quinn, Shane Black, Beth Toussaint	
M A Y	6	The Good, the Bad, and Huckleberry Hound	Worldvision Enterprises / Hanna-Barbera Productions	Bob Goe, John Kimball, Charles A. Nichols, Jay Sarbry, Ray Patterson (directors); John Ludin, Tom Ruegger (screenplay); Daws Butler, Charlie Adler, Michael Bell, Pat Buttram, Pat Fraley, Allan Melvin, Don Messick, Howard Morris, B. J. Ward, Frank Welker	
M A Y	6	Jack's Back	Palisades Entertainment	Rowdy Herrington (director/screenplay); James Spader, Cynthia Gibb, Jim Haynie, Robert Picardo, Rod Loomis, Rex Ryon, Chris Mulkey, Mario Machado, Danitza Kingsley	
M A Y	6	Judgment in Berlin	New Line Cinema	Leo Penn (director/screenplay); Joshua Sinclair (screenplay); Martin Sheen, Sam Wanamaker, Max Gail, Heinz Hoenig, Carl Lumbly, Cristine Rose, Joshua Sinclair, Jutta Speidel, Harris Yulin, Sean Penn, Malgorzata Gebel, Ed Bishop, Jürgen Heinrich, Max Volkert Martens, Marie-Louise Sinclair, Burt Nelson	
M A Y	6	Salsa	The Cannon Group, Inc. / A Golan-Globus Production	Boaz Davidson (director/screenplay); Tomas Benitez, Shepard Goldman (screenplay); Robby Rosa, Rodney Harvey, Miranda Garrison, Angela Alvarado, Valente Rodriquez, Renee Victor, Bobby Caldwell, Chain Reaction, Willie Colon, Celia Cruz, Mavis Vegas Davis, Marisela Esqueda, Grupo Latino, La Dimencion, Mongo Santamaria, Kenny Ortega, Tito Puente, Michael Sembello, German Wilkins Velez, The Edwin Hawkins Singers	
M A Y	6	Shakedown	Universal Pictures	James Glickenhaus (director/screenplay); Peter Weller, Sam Elliott, Patricia Charbonneau, Jude Ciccolella, Antonio Fargas, Blanche Baker, Richard Brooks, John C. McGinley, Thomas G. Waites, Tom Mardirosian, Anthony Crivello	
M A Y	6	Wings of Desire	Orion Classics / Road Movies Filmproduktion / Argos Films / Westdeutscher Rundfunk	Wim Wenders (director/screenplay); Peter Handke, Richard Reitinger (screenplay); Bruno Ganz, Solveig Dommartin, Otto Sander, Curt Bois, Peter Falk, Nick Cave and the Bad Seeds, Crime & the City Solution	
M A Y	13	Friday the 13th Part VII: The New Blood	Paramount Pictures	John Carl Buechler (director); Manuel Fidello, Daryl Haney (screenplay); Lar Park Lincoln, Kevin Blair, Susan Blu, Terry Kiser, Kane Hodder, Elizabeth Kaitan, Jeff Bennett, Heidi Kozak, Diana Barrows, William Butler, Walt Gorney, Susan Jennifer Sullivan, Jon Renfield, Larry Cox, Craig Thomas, Diane Almeida, Staci Greason, Debora Kessler, Michael Schroeder	
M A Y	13	Maniac Cop	Shapiro-Glickenhaus Entertainment	William Lustig (director); Larry Cohen (screenplay); Tom Atkins, Bruce Campbell, Laurene Landon, Richard Roundtree, William Smith, Robert Z'Dar, Sheree North, Nina Arvesen, Victoria Catlin, Ken Lerner, William Lustig, Sam Raimi, Jake LaMotta	
M A Y	13	The Nest	Metro-Goldwyn-Mayer	Terence H. Winkless (director); Robert King (screenplay); Robert Lansing, Lisa Langlois, Franc Luz, Terri Treas, Diana Bellamy, Stephen Davies	
M A Y	13	Not of This Earth	Concorde Pictures	Jim Wynorski (director/screenplay); R.J. Robertson (screenplay); Traci Lords, Arthur Roberts, Lenny Juliano, Rebecca Perle	
M A Y	20	Aria	Miramax Films / Lightyear Entertainment / Virgin Films	Robert Altman, Bruce Beresford, Bill Bryden, Derek Jarman, Franc Roddam, Nicolas Roeg, Ken Russell, Charles Sturridge, Julien Temple (directors/screenplay); Jean-Luc Godard (director); Don Boyd, Louis de Cahusac, Philippe Quinault (screenplay); Theresa Russell, Buck Henry, Beverly D'Angelo, John Hurt, Anita Morris, Bridget Fonda, Valérie Allain, Elizabeth Hurley, Peter Birch, Julie Hagerty, Geneviève Page, Sandrine Dumas, Linzi Drew, Tilda Swinton, Spencer Leigh, Sophie Ward, John Hostetter, Albie Selznick, Andreas Wisniewski, Anne Canovas, Philippe Leroy-Beaulieu, Stephanie Lane, Nicola Swain, Jackson Kyle, Marianne McLaughlin, Marion Peterson, Garry Kasper, Chris Campion, James Mathers, Amy Johnson, Stan Mazin	
M A Y	20	Call Me	Vestron Pictures	Sollace Mitchell (director/screenplay); Karyn Kay (screenplay); Patricia Charbonneau, Stephen McHattie, Boyd Gaines, Sam Freed, Steve Buscemi, Patti D'Arbanville, David Strathairn, Olek Krupa	
M A Y	20	Rikky and Pete	United Artists / Film Victoria / Cascade Films	Nadia Tass (director); David Parker (screenplay); Stephen Kearney, Nina Landis, Tetchie Agbayani, Bill Hunter, Bruno Lawrence, Bruce Spence, Lewis Fitz-Gerald, Dorothy Alison, Peter Cummins, Peter Hehir, Don Reid, Ralph Cotterill, Roderick Williams, Denis Lees, Robert Baxter	
M A Y	20	Willow	Metro-Goldwyn-Mayer / Lucasfilm	Ron Howard (director); Bob Dolman (screenplay); Warwick Davis, Val Kilmer, Joanne Whalley, Jean Marsh, Patricia Hayes, Billy Barty, Pat Roach, Gavan O'Herlihy, Kevin Pollak, Rick Overton, David J. Steinberg, Mark Northover, Phil Fondacaro, Malcolm Dixon, Tony Cox, Kenny Baker, Sadie Corré, Samantha Davis, Gerry Crampton, Greg Powell, Jack Purvis, Maria Holvoe, Julie Peters	
M A Y	25	Crocodile Dundee II	Paramount Pictures	John Cornell (director); Paul Hogan, Brett Hogan (screenplay); Paul Hogan, Linda Kozlowski, John Meillon, Ernie Dingo, Steve Rackman, Gerry Skilton, Gus Mercurio, Jim Holt, Betty Bobbitt, Juan Fernández, Charles S. Dutton, Kenneth Welsh, Stephen Root, Dennis Boutsikaris, Carlos Carrasco, Luis Guzmán, Marilyn Sokol, Gregory Jbara, Doug Skinner, Anthony Crivello, Susie Essman, Tatyana Ali, Jace Alexander, Victor Colicchio, Colin Quinn, Alec Wilson, Hechter Ubarry, Bill Sandy, Alfred Coolwell	
M A Y	25	Rambo III	Tri-Star Pictures / Carolco Pictures	Peter MacDonald (director); Sylvester Stallone, Sheldon Lettich (screenplay); Sylvester Stallone, Richard Crenna, Kurtwood Smith, Marc de Jonge, Sasson Gabai, Doudi Shoua, Spiros Focas, Randy Raney, Marcus Gilbert, Alon Abutbul, Mahmoud Assadollahi, Yosef Shiloah, Shaby Ben-Aroya	
M A Y	27	Killer Klowns from Outer Space	Trans World Entertainment	Stephen Chiodo (director/screenplay); Charles Chiodo (screenplay); Grant Cramer, Suzanne Snyder, John Allen Nelson, John Vernon, Royal Dano, Michael S. Siegel, Peter Licassi, Charles Chiodo, Christopher Titus	
M A Y	28	Clinton and Nadine	HBO Pictures / ITC Entertainment	Jerry Schatzberg (director); Robert Foster (screenplay); Andy García, Ellen Barkin, Morgan Freeman, John C. McGinley, Michael Lombard, Brad Sullivan, Alan North, Bill Raymond, Mario Ernesto Sánchez, Julio Oscar Mechoso, Helen Hanft, Nancy Giles, Helen Davies, Anthony Correa, Jay Amor, Carlos Cestero, Pedro De Pool	
J U N E	3	Big	20th Century Fox	Penny Marshall (director); Gary Ross, Anne Spielberg (screenplay); Tom Hanks, Elizabeth Perkins, Robert Loggia, John Heard, Jared Rushton, Jon Lovitz, Mercedes Ruehl, Josh Clark, Debra Jo Rupp, David Moscow, Peter McRobbie, Gary Howard Klar, Rockets Redglare, Paul Herman, James Eckhouse, John Rothman, Judd Trichter, Bruce Jarchow	
J U N E	3	Funny Farm	Warner Bros. Pictures	George Roy Hill (director); Jeffrey Boam (screenplay); Chevy Chase, Madolyn Smith, Joseph Maher, Jack Gilpin, Brad Sullivan, MacIntyre Dixon, Kevin O'Morrison, Mike Starr, Alice Drummond, Glenn Plummer, Bill Fagerbakke, Nicholas Wyman, William Newman, Kevin Conway, Caris Corfman	
J U N E	10	Big Business	Touchstone Pictures	Jim Abrahams (director); Dori Pierson, Marc Reid Rubel (screenplay); Bette Midler, Lily Tomlin, Fred Ward, Edward Herrmann, Michele Placido, Daniel Gerroll, Barry Primus, Michael Gross, Deborah Rush, Nicolas Coster, Patricia Gaul, J.C. Quinn, Norma MacMillan, Joe Grifasi, John Vickery, John Hancock, Mary Gross, Seth Green, Leo Burmester, Lucy Webb, Roy Brocksmith, Lewis Arquette, Ritch Brinkley, Carmen Argenziano, Lois de Banzie, Al Mancini, Hunter von Leer, Chick Hearn, Louis Rukeyser, Shirley Mitchell	
J U N E	10	Poltergeist III	Metro-Goldwyn-Mayer	Gary Sherman (director/screenplay); Brian Taggert (screenplay); Tom Skerritt, Nancy Allen, Heather O'Rourke, Zelda Rubinstein, Lara Flynn Boyle, Richard Fire, Kip Wentz, Nathan Davis, Meg Thalken, Alan Wilder, Corey Burton, Paul Graham, Meg Weldon, Stacy Gilchrist, Joey Garfield, Roy Hytower, Dean Tokuno, Catherine Gatz, Paty Lombard, E.J. Murray, Sherry Narens, Phil Locker, Jane Alderman	
J U N E	10	The Presidio	Paramount Pictures	Peter Hyams (director); Larry Ferguson (screenplay); Sean Connery, Mark Harmon, Meg Ryan, Jack Warden, Mark Blum, Jenette Goldstein, Don Calfa, Robert Lesser, Rick Zumwalt, Jessie Lawrence Ferguson, Larry "Flash" Jenkins, Jesse D. Goins, Patrick Kilpatrick, Jophery C. Brown, Allan Graf, Bob Delegall, Dana Gladstone, Marvin J. McIntyre, James Hooks Reynolds, Kim Robillard	
J U N E	10	Puss in Boots	The Cannon Group	Eugene Marner (director); Christopher Walken, Jason Connery, Carmela Marner, Yossi Graber, Amnon Meskin, Elki Jacobs, Michael Schneider	
J U N E	15	Bull Durham	Orion Pictures	Ron Shelton (director/screenplay); Kevin Costner, Susan Sarandon, Tim Robbins, Trey Wilson, Robert Wuhl, William O'Leary, Jenny Robertson, Danny Gans, Max Patkin	
J U N E	17	The Decline of Western Civilization Part II: The Metal Years	New Line Cinema	Penelope Spheeris (director); Alice Cooper, Ozzy Osbourne, Poison, Aerosmith, Kiss, Motörhead, Megadeth, Faster Pussycat, Lizzy Borden, London, Odin	
J U N E	17	The Great Outdoors	Universal Pictures / Hughes Entertainment	Howard Deutch (director); John Hughes (screenplay); Dan Aykroyd, John Candy, Stephanie Faracy, Annette Bening, Robert Prosky, Chris Young, Ian Giatti, Hillary and Rebecca Gordon, Lucy Deakins, Nancy Lenehan, John Bloom, Lewis Arquette, Britt Leach, Bart the Bear, Jerry Maren	
J U N E	17	Red Heat	Tri-Star Pictures / Carolco Pictures	Walter Hill (director/screenplay); Harry Kleiner, Troy Kennedy Martin (screenplay); Arnold Schwarzenegger, James Belushi, Peter Boyle, Ed O'Ross, Larry Fishburne, Gina Gershon, Richard Bright, J.W. Smith, Brent Jennings, Gretchen Palmer, Pruitt Taylor Vince, Michael G. Hagerty, Brion James, Peter Jason, Oleg Vidov, Savely Kramarov, Gabor Koncz, Geza Balkay, Tiger Chung Lee, Sven-Ole Thorsen, Gigi Vorgan, Allan Graf, Kurt Fuller, Luis Contreras, Joey D. Vieira, Michael Adams, Jenifer Lewis	
J U N E	17	Waxwork	Vestron Pictures	Anthony Hickox (director/screenplay); Zach Galligan, Deborah Foreman, Michelle Johnson, Dana Ashbrook, Micah Grant, Eric Brown, Clare Carey, David Warner, Patrick Macnee, Mihaly "Michu" Meszaros, Jack David Warner, Charles McCaughan, J. Kenneth Campbell, Miles O'Keeffe, John Rhys-Davies, Jennifer Bassey, Edward Ashley	
J U N E	17	A World Apart	Atlantic Releasing Corporation	Chris Menges (director); Shawn Slovo (screenplay); Barbara Hershey, David Suchet, Jeroen Krabbé, Paul Freeman, Tim Roth, Jodhi May, Linda Mvusi, Kate Fitzpatrick, Yvonne Bryceland, Rosalie Crutchley, Adrian Dunbar, Jude Akuwudike, Nadine Chalmers, Carolyn Clayton-Cragg, Albee Lesotho, Merav Gruer, Nomaziko Zondo	
J U N E	22	Who Framed Roger Rabbit	Touchstone Pictures / Amblin Entertainment	Robert Zemeckis (director); Jeffrey Price, Peter S. Seaman (screenplay); Bob Hoskins, Christopher Lloyd, Charles Fleischer, Stubby Kaye, Joanna Cassidy, Alan Tilvern, Richard LeParmentier, Betsy Brantley, Joel Silver, Richard Ridings, Mike Edmonds, Ed Herlihy, Billy J. Mitchell, April Winchell, Mae Questel, Mel Blanc, Tony Anselmo, Joe Alaskey, David L. Lander, Fred Newman, June Foray, Russi Taylor, Richard Williams, Wayne Allwine, Pat Buttram, Jim Cummings, Frank Sinatra, Tony Pope, Cherry Davis, Jack Angel, Corey Burton, Nancy Cartwright, Sadie Corre, Bill Farmer, Clarence Nash, Kathleen Turner, Amy Irving, Frank Welker, Lou Hirsch, Paul Springer, Morgan Deare, Eugene Gutierrez, Mary T. Radford, Les Perkins, Jim Gallant, Peter Westy, Mickie McGowan	
J U N E	24	A Handful of Dust	New Line Cinema / London Weekend Television	Charles Sturridge (director/screenplay); Tim Sullivan, Derek Granger (screenplay); James Wilby, Kristin Scott Thomas, Rupert Graves, Anjelica Huston, Judi Dench, Alec Guinness, Pip Torrens, Beatie Edney, Stephen Fry, Graham Crowden, Timothy Bateson, Moyra Fraser, Marsha Fitzalan, Annabel Brooks, Richard Beale, Norman Lumsden, Richard Leech, Hugh Simon, Cathryn Harrison, John Junkin, Christopher Godwin	
J U N E	29	Coming to America	Paramount Pictures	John Landis (director); David Sheffield, Barry W. Blaustein (screenplay); Eddie Murphy, Arsenio Hall, James Earl Jones, John Amos, Madge Sinclair, Shari Headley, Eriq La Salle, Frankie Faison, Vanessa Bell Calloway, Louie Anderson, Jake Steinfeld, Calvin Lockhart, Samuel L. Jackson, Vondie Curtis-Hall, Garcelle Beauvais, Victoria Dillard, Ruben Santiago-Hudson, Cuba Gooding Jr., Don Ameche, Ralph Bellamy, Midori, Montrose Hagins, Michael Tadross, Steve White, Helen Hanft, Jim Abrahams, Barry W. Blaustein, F. Gary Gray, Tobe Hooper, Nile Rodgers, David Sheffield, Paul Bates, Allison Dean, Sheila Johnson	

== July–September ==
Opening		Title	Production company	Cast and crew	Ref.
J U L Y	6	License to Drive	20th Century Fox / Davis Entertainment	Greg Beeman (director); Neil Tolkin (screenplay); Corey Haim, Corey Feldman, Carol Kane, Richard Masur, Heather Graham, Michael Manasseri, Parley Baer, Nina Siemaszko, James Avery, Grant Goodeve, Grant Heslov, Michael Ensign, Helen Hanft, R. A. Mihailoff, Carlos Lacámara	
J U L Y	6	Short Circuit 2	Tri-Star Pictures	Kenneth Johnson (director); Brent Maddock, S. S. Wilson (screenplay); Tim Blaney, Fisher Stevens, Michael McKean, Cynthia Gibb, Jack Weston, David Hemblen, Dee McCafferty, Don Lake, Damon D'Oliveira, Robert LaSardo, Lili Francks, Gerry Parkes, Eric Keenleyside, Jeremy Ratchford, Garry Robbins, Ally Sheedy	
J U L Y	8	Arthur 2: On the Rocks	Warner Bros. Pictures	Bud Yorkin (director); Andy Breckman (screenplay); Dudley Moore, Liza Minnelli, John Gielgud, Geraldine Fitzgerald, Kathy Bates, Paul Benedict, Stephen Elliott, Cynthia Sikes, Ted Ross, Jack Gilford, Ron Canada, Barney Martin, David O'Brien, Daniel Greene, Molly McClure, Don Stark, Raymond O'Connor, Eagle-Eye Cherry, Daryl Edwards, David Sabin, Jason Wingreen	
J U L Y	8	It Couldn't Happen Here	Liberty Films	Jack Bond (director/screenplay); Neil Tennant, Chris Lowe, Joss Ackland, Neil Dickson, Gareth Hunt, Barbara Windsor	
J U L Y	8	Phantasm II	Universal Pictures	Don Coscarelli (director/screenplay); Angus Scrimm, James LeGros, Reggie Bannister, Paula Irvine, Samantha Phillips, Kenneth Tigar, Stacey Travis, A. Michael Baldwin, Rubin Kushner, Ruth C. Engel, J. Patrick McNamara, Mark Anthony Major	
J U L Y	13	The Dead Pool	Warner Bros. Pictures	Buddy Van Horn (director); Steve Sharon (screenplay); Clint Eastwood, Patricia Clarkson, Liam Neeson, Evan Kim, David Hunt, Michael Currie, Michael Goodwin, Jim Carrey, Anthony Charnota, Ronnie Claire Edwards, Louis Giambalvo, Diego Chairs, Charles Martinet, Patrick Van Horn, Shawn Elliott, Bill Wattenburg, Marc Alaimo, Justin Whalin, Harry Demopoulos	
J U L Y	15	Die Hard	20th Century Fox / Silver Pictures	John McTiernan (director); Jeb Stuart, Steven E. de Souza (screenplay); Bruce Willis, Alan Rickman, Alexander Godunov, Bonnie Bedelia, Reginald VelJohnson, Paul Gleason, De'voreaux White, William Atherton, Clarence Gilyard, Hart Bochner, James Shigeta, Andreas Wisniewski, Lorenzo Caccialanza, Dennis Hayden, Al Leong, Wilhelm von Homburg, Robert Davi, Grand L. Bush, Tracy Reiner, Taylor Fry, Bruno Doyon, Joey Plewa, Gerard Bonn, Gary Roberts, Hans Buhringer, Noah Land	
J U L Y	15	A Fish Called Wanda	Metro-Goldwyn-Mayer	Charles Crichton (director); John Cleese (screenplay); John Cleese, Jamie Lee Curtis, Kevin Kline, Michael Palin, Tom Georgeson, Maria Aitken, Cynthia Cleese, Patricia Hayes, Geoffrey Palmer, Roger Brierley, Llewellyn Rees, Stephen Fry, Al Hunter Ashton	
J U L Y	20	Midnight Run	Universal Pictures	Martin Brest (director); George Gallo (screenplay); Robert De Niro, Charles Grodin, Yaphet Kotto, John Ashton, Dennis Farina, Joe Pantoliano, Richard Foronjy, Robert Miranda, Jack Kehoe, Wendy Phillips, Danielle DuClos, Philip Baker Hall, Tom McCleister, Fran Brill, Tracey Walter, John Toles-Bey, Lois Smith, Frank Pesce, Tom Irwin, Jimmie Ray Weeks, Jack N. Young, Scott McAfee, Martin Brest	
J U L Y	22	Big Top Pee-wee	Paramount Pictures	Randal Kleiser (director); Paul Reubens, George McGrath (screenplay); Paul Reubens, Kris Kristofferson, Susan Tyrrell, Valeria Golino, Penelope Ann Miller, Wayne White, Albert Henderson, Jack Murdock, David Byrd, Dustin Diamond, Frances Bay, Mary Jackson, Leo Gordon, Anne Seymour, Kenneth Tobey, Jay Robinson, Mihaly "Michu" Meszaros, Franco Columbu, Terrence Mann, Vance Colvig, Matthias Hues, Benicio del Toro, Kevin Peter Hall, Lynne Marie Stewart, Joey Arias	
J U L Y	22	Caddyshack II	Warner Bros. Pictures	Allan Arkush (director); Harold Ramis, Peter Torokvei (screenplay); Jackie Mason, Robert Stack, Dyan Cannon, Dina Merrill, Jonathan Silverman, Brian McNamara, Marsha Warfield, Paul Bartel, Randy Quaid, Chevy Chase, Dan Aykroyd, Jessica Lundy, Chynna Phillips, Anthony Mockus, Bibi Osterwald, Frank Welker, James Veeley	
J U L Y	22	Mr. North	The Samuel Goldwyn Company	Danny Huston (director); John Huston, James Costigan (screenplay); Anthony Edwards, Robert Mitchum, Harry Dean Stanton, Anjelica Huston, Mary Stuart Masterson, Virginia Madsen, Tammy Grimes, David Warner, Lauren Bacall, Hunter Carson, Christopher Durang, Mark Metcalf, Katharine Houghton, Cleveland Amory, Christopher Lawford	
J U L Y	29	Cocktail	Touchstone Pictures	Roger Donaldson (director); Heywood Gould (screenplay); Tom Cruise, Bryan Brown, Elisabeth Shue, Lisa Banes, Laurence Luckinbill, Kelly Lynch, Gina Gershon, Ron Dean, Ellen Foley, Paul Benedict, Chris Owens, Louis Ferreira, Larry Block, Gerry Bamman, James Eckhouse, Liisa Repo-Martell	
J U L Y	29	Monkey Shines	Orion Pictures	George A. Romero (director/screenplay); Jason Beghe, John Pankow, Kate McNeil, Joyce Van Patten, Christine Forrest, Stephen Root, Stanley Tucci, Janine Turner, William Newman, Tudi Wiggins, Tom Quinn, Patricia Tallman, David Early, Frank Welker	
J U L Y	29	The New Adventures of Pippi Longstocking	Columbia Pictures	Ken Annakin (director/screenplay); Tami Erin, Eileen Brennan, Dennis Dugan, Dianne Hull, George DiCenzo, John Schuck, Dick Van Patten, David Seaman Jr., Cory Crow, Branscombe Richmond, Fay Masterson, Frank Welker, Michael Bell, Carole Kean, Clark Niederjohn, Michael Mendelson	
A U G U S T	5	The Blob	Tri-Star Pictures	Chuck Russell (director/screenplay); Frank Darabont (screenplay); Kevin Dillon, Shawnee Smith, Donovan Leitch, Jeffrey DeMunn, Candy Clark, Joe Seneca, Del Close, Paul McCrane, Robert Axelrod, Beau Billingslea, Michael Kenworthy, Douglas Emerson, Jamison Newlander, Art LaFleur, Billy Beck, Jack Nance, Bill Moseley, Erika Eleniak, Ricky Paull Goldin, Frank Collison, Jack Rader, Clayton Landey, Julie McCullough, Margaret Smith, Pons Maar, Peter Crombie, Rick Avery, Noble Craig, Charlie Spradling, Chuck Russell	
A U G U S T	5	The Rescue	Touchstone Pictures	Ferdinand Fairfax (director); Jim Thomas, John Thomas (screenplay); Kevin Dillon, Marc Price, Ned Vaughn, Christine Harnos, Ian Giatti, Charles Haid, Edward Albert, Timothy Carhart, Michael Gates Phenicie, Mel Wong, James Cromwell	
A U G U S T	5	Vibes	Columbia Pictures / Imagine Entertainment	Ken Kwapis (director); Lowell Ganz, Babaloo Mandel (screenplay); Cyndi Lauper, Jeff Goldblum, Julian Sands, Googy Gress, Peter Falk, Ronald G. Joseph, Ramon Bieri, Michael Lerner, Elizabeth Peña, Rodney Kageyama, Van Dyke Parks, Joseph V. Perry, Park Overall, Max Perlich, John Kapelos, Don Bexley, Bill McCutcheon, Steve Buscemi	
A U G U S T	10	Clean and Sober	Warner Bros. Pictures / Imagine Entertainment	Glenn Gordon Caron (director); Tod Carroll (screenplay); Michael Keaton, Kathy Baker, Morgan Freeman, M. Emmet Walsh, Luca Bercovici, Tate Donovan, Claudia Christian, Brian Benben, Henry Judd Baker, J. David Krassner, Dakin Matthews, Ben Piazza, Rachel Ryan	
A U G U S T	12	The Last Temptation of Christ	Universal Pictures	Martin Scorsese (director); Paul Schrader (screenplay); Willem Dafoe, Harvey Keitel, Barbara Hershey, Harry Dean Stanton, David Bowie, Steve Shill, Verna Bloom, Roberts Blossom, Barry Miller, Gary Basaraba, Irvin Kershner, Victor Argo, Paul Herman, John Lurie, Michael Been, Leo Burmester, Andre Gregory, Tomas Arana, Alan Rosenberg, Nehemiah Persoff, Peter Berling, Leo Marks	
A U G U S T	12	Mac and Me	Orion Pictures	Stewart Raffill (director/screenplay); Steve Feke (screenplay); Christine Ebersole, Jonathan Ward, Jade Calegory, Katrina Caspary, Lauren Stanley, Barbara Allyne Bennet, Martin West, Ivan J. Rado, Danny Cooksey	
A U G U S T	12	Tucker: The Man and His Dream	Paramount Pictures	Francis Ford Coppola (director); Arnold Schulman, David Seidler (screenplay); Jeff Bridges, Joan Allen, Martin Landau, Elias Koteas, Frederic Forrest, Christian Slater, Don Novello, Nina Siemaszko, Mako, Dean Stockwell, Anders Johnson, Corin Nemec, Marshall Bell, Jay O. Sanders, Peter Donat, Patti Austin, Sandy Bull, Scott Beach, Leonard Gardner, Jessie Nelson, Michael McShane	
A U G U S T	12	Young Guns	20th Century Fox / Morgan Creek Productions	Christopher Cain (director); John Fusco (screenplay); Emilio Estevez, Kiefer Sutherland, Lou Diamond Phillips, Charlie Sheen, Dermot Mulroney, Casey Siemaszko, Terence Stamp, Jack Palance, Terry O'Quinn, Geoffrey Blake, Brian Keith, Patrick Wayne, Tom Callaway, Lisa Banes, Tom Cruise, Randy Travis, Sharon Thomas, Alice Carter	
A U G U S T	19	The Big Blue	Columbia Pictures / Weintraub Entertainment Group / Gaumont	Luc Besson (director/screenplay); Robert Garland, Marilyn Goldin, Jacques Mayol, Marc Perrier (screenplay); Rosanna Arquette, Jean-Marc Barr, Jean Reno, Paul Shenar, Sergio Castellitto, Marc Duret, Griffin Dunne, Andréas Voutsinas, Valentina Vargas, Kimberly Beck, Luc Besson, Patrick Fontana, Alessandra Vazzoler, Geoffroy Carey, Bruce Guerre-Berthelot, Gregory Forstner, Claude Besson	
A U G U S T	19	Married to the Mob	Orion Pictures	Jonathan Demme (director); Barry Strugatz, Mark R. Burns (screenplay); Michelle Pfeiffer, Matthew Modine, Dean Stockwell, Mercedes Ruehl, Alec Baldwin, Joan Cusack, Ellen Foley, O-Lan Jones, Oliver Platt, Nancy Travis, 'Sister' Carol East, Tracey Walter, Chris Isaak, Obba Babatundé, Charles Napier, Gary Howard Klar, Gary Goetzman, Jonathan Demme, Al Lewis, Ellie Cornell, Trey Wilson, Maria Karnilova, Captain Haggerty, Marlene Willoughby, Ralph Corsel, Joe Spinell, Kenneth Utt, Roy Blount Jr., Todd Solondz, Roma Maffia, Paul Lazar, Frank Ferrara, Frank Gio, Warren Miller, Anthony J. Nici, Steve Vignari	
A U G U S T	19	A Nightmare on Elm Street 4: The Dream Master	New Line Cinema	Renny Harlin (director); Brian Helgeland, Ken Wheat, Jim Wheat (screenplay); Robert Englund, Lisa Wilcox, Danny Hassel, Tuesday Knight, Ken Sagoes, Rodney Eastman, Andras Jones, Brooke Theiss, Nicholas Mele, Brooke Bundy, Linnea Quigley, Robert Shaye, Hope Marie Carlton, Duane Davis, Toy Newkirk, Renny Harlin	
A U G U S T	24	Crossing Delancey	Warner Bros. Pictures	Joan Micklin Silver (director); Susan Sandler (screenplay); Amy Irving, Peter Riegert, Reizl Bozyk, Jeroen Krabbé, Sylvia Miles, George Martin, John Bedford Lloyd, Claudia Silver, David Hyde Pierce, Rosemary Harris, Suzzy Roche, Amy Wright, Faye Grant, Deborah Offner, Kathleen Wilhoite, Reg E. Cathey, Susan Blommaert, Dolores Sutton, Michael Ornstein, Susan Sandler	
A U G U S T	25	The Thin Blue Line	Miramax Films	Errol Morris (director/screenplay); Randall Adams, David Ray Harris	
A U G U S T	26	Betrayed	United Artists	Costa-Gavras (director); Joe Eszterhas (screenplay); Debra Winger, Tom Berenger, John Heard, Betsy Blair, John Mahoney, Ted Levine, Jeffrey DeMunn, Albert Hall, David Clennon, Richard Libertini, Ralph Foody	
A U G U S T	26	Hero and the Terror	Cannon Films	William Tannen (director); Michael Blodgett (screenplay); Chuck Norris, Brynn Thayer, Steve James, Jack O'Halloran, Jeffrey Kramer, Ron O'Neal, Murphy Dunne, Heather Blodgett, Tony DiBenedetto, Billy Drago, Joe Guzaldo, Peter Miller, Karen Witter	
A U G U S T	26	Hot to Trot	Warner Bros. Pictures	Michael Dinner (director); Hugo Gilbert, Stephen Neigher, Charlie Peters, Andy Breckman (screenplay); Bobcat Goldthwait, Dabney Coleman, Virginia Madsen, Cindy Pickett, Jim Metzler, Tim Kazurinsky, Barbara Whinnery, Mary Gross, Liz Torres, Burgess Meredith, John Candy	
A U G U S T	26	Stealing Home	Warner Bros. Pictures	Steven Kampmann, William Porter (directors/screenplay); Mark Harmon, Jodie Foster, Harold Ramis, Jonathan Silverman, Blair Brown, Richard Jenkins, John Shea, Christine Jones, Ted Ross, Helen Hunt, Beth Broderick, William McNamara, Thacher Goodwin	
S E P T E M B E R	2	The Deceivers	Cinecom Pictures	Nicholas Meyer (director); Michael Hirst (screenplay); Pierce Brosnan, Saeed Jaffrey, Shashi Kapoor, Shanmukha Srinivas, Helena Michell, Keith Michell, David Robb, Tariq Yunus, Jalal Agha, Gary Cady, Salim Ghouse, Neena Gupta, Nayeem Hafizka, Bijoya Jena, H. N. Kalia, Rajesh Vivek, Kammo	
S E P T E M B E R	2	Eight Men Out	Orion Pictures	John Sayles (director/screenplay); John Cusack, Clifton James, Michael Lerner, Christopher Lloyd, Charlie Sheen, David Strathairn, D. B. Sweeney, John Mahoney, Michael Rooker, Don Harvey, James Read, Perry Lang, Gordon Clapp, Jace Alexander, Bill Irwin, Richard Edson, Kevin Tighe, Michael Mantell, John Anderson, Studs Terkel, John Sayles, Barbara Garrick, Maggie Renzi, Nancy Travis	
S E P T E M B E R	2	Rocket Gibraltar	Columbia Pictures	Daniel Petrie (director); Amos Poe (screenplay); Burt Lancaster, Suzy Amis, Patricia Clarkson, Macaulay Culkin, Angela Goethals, Frances Conroy, John Glover, Sinéad Cusack, Sara Rue, Bill Pullman, Kevin Spacey, David Hyde Pierce, Danny Corkill, James McDaniel, Renée Coleman, John Bell, Nicky Bronson, Sara Goethals, Emily Poe, George Martin, Matt Norklun, Robert Compono	
S E P T E M B E R	9	Moon over Parador	Universal Pictures	Paul Mazursky (director/screenplay); Leon Capetanos (screenplay); Richard Dreyfuss, Raúl Juliá, Sônia Braga, Jonathan Winters, Fernando Rey, Dana Delany, Michael Greene, Polly Holliday, Milton Gonçalves, Charo, Marianne Sägebrecht, Sammy Davis Jr., Ike Pappas, Edward Asner, Lorin Dreyfuss, Reinhard Kolldehoff	
S E P T E M B E R	9	Running on Empty	Warner Bros. Pictures / Lorimar Motion Pictures	Sidney Lumet (director); Naomi Foner (screenplay); Christine Lahti, Judd Hirsch, River Phoenix, Martha Plimpton, Jonas Abry, L. M. Kit Carson, Steven Hill, Augusta Dabney	
S E P T E M B E R	9	Track 29	Island Pictures / Cannon Films / HandMade Films	Nicolas Roeg (director); Dennis Potter (screenplay); Theresa Russell, Gary Oldman, Christopher Lloyd, Colleen Camp, Sandra Bernhard, Seymour Cassel, Leon Rippy, Vance Colvig Jr.	
S E P T E M B E R	15	War Party	Hemdale Film Corporation	Franc Roddam (director); Spencer Eastman (screenplay); Billy Wirth, Kevin Dillon, Tim Sampson, Jimmie Ray Weeks, Kevyn Major Howard, Jerry Hardin, Tantoo Cardinal, Bill McKinney, Guy Boyd, R. D. Call, William Frankfather, M. Emmet Walsh, Dennis Banks, Saginaw Grant, Rodney A. Grant	
S E P T E M B E R	16	The Beast	Columbia Pictures	Kevin Reynolds (director); William Mastrosimone (screenplay); George Dzundza, Jason Patric, Steven Bauer, Erick Avari, Stephen Baldwin, Donald Patrick Harvey, David Sherrill, Kabir Bedi, Chaim Jeraffi, Shoshi Marciano, Yitzhak Ne'eman, Roberto Pollack, Avi Gilor, Beni Baruchin, Victor Ken, Avi Keedar, Claude Aviram, Moshe Vapnik, Dale Dye	
S E P T E M B E R	16	Doin' Time on Planet Earth	The Cannon Group	Charles Matthau (director); Darren Star (screenplay); Nicholas Strouse, Andrea Thompson, Martha Scott, Adam West, Hugh Gillin, Matt Adler, Timothy Patrick Murphy, Candice Azzara, Gloria Henry, Paula Irvine, Hugh O'Brian, Roddy McDowell, Maureen Stapleton, Kellie Martin	
S E P T E M B E R	16	Messenger of Death	Cannon Films	J. Lee Thompson (director); Paul Jarrico (screenplay); Charles Bronson, Trish Van Devere, Laurence Luckinbill, Daniel Benzali, Marilyn Hassett, Charles Dierkop, Jeff Corey, John Ireland, Penny Peyser, Gene Davis, John Solari, Jon Cedar, Tom Everett, Duncan Gamble, Bert Williams, Cheryl Waters, Maria Mayenzet, Margaret Howell, Warner Loughlin, Kimberly Beck, Beverly Thompson, Don Kennedy, Susan Bjurman	
S E P T E M B E R	16	Miles from Home	Cinecom Pictures	Gary Sinise (director); Chris Gerolmo (screenplay); Richard Gere, Kevin Anderson, Penelope Ann Miller, Helen Hunt, Terry Kinney, Brian Dennehy, Laurie Metcalf, Francis Guinan, Judith Ivey, John Malkovich, Larry Poling	
S E P T E M B E R	16	The Prince of Pennsylvania	New Line Cinema	Ron Nyswaner (director/screenplay); Fred Ward, Keanu Reeves, Bonnie Bedelia, Amy Madigan, Jay O. Sanders, Jeff Hayenga, Tracey Ellis, Joseph De Lisi, Don Brockett, Dan Monahan	
S E P T E M B E R	16	Tougher Than Leather	New Line Cinema	Rick Rubin (director/screenplay); Ric Menello (screenplay); Run-DMC, Richard Edson, Jenny Lumet, The Beastie Boys	
S E P T E M B E R	18	Rockin' with Judy Jetson	Worldvision Enterprises / Hanna-Barbera Productions	Paul Sommer, Ray Patterson (directors); Charles M. Howell IV, Kevin Hopps (screenplay); Janet Waldo, George O'Hanlon, Daws Butler, Penny Singleton, Don Messick, Jean Vander Pyl, Mel Blanc, Rob Paulsen, Ruth Buzzi, Pat Musick, Charlie Adler, Pat Fraley, Michael Bell, Steve Bulen, Hamilton Camp, Peter Cullen, B. J. Ward, Beau Weaver, Cindy McGee, Selette Cole, P. L. Brown, Eric Suter	
S E P T E M B E R	23	Dead Ringers	20th Century Fox / Morgan Creek Productions	David Cronenberg (director/screenplay); Norman Snider (screenplay); Jeremy Irons, Geneviève Bujold, Heidi von Palleske, Barbara Gordon, Shirley Douglas, Stephen Lack, Nick Nichols, Lynne Cormack, Damir Andrei, Miriam Newhouse, Jill Hennessy, Jacqueline Hennessy, Johnathan Haley, Nicholas Haley	
S E P T E M B E R	23	Gorillas in the Mist	Universal Pictures / Warner Bros. Pictures	Michael Apted (director); Anna Hamilton Phelan (screenplay); Sigourney Weaver, Bryan Brown, Julie Harris, John Omirah Miluwi, Iain Cuthbertson, Constantin Alexandrov, Waigwa Wachira, Iain Glen, David Lansbury, Maggie O'Neill, Konga Mbandu, Michael J. Reynolds, Gordon Masten, Peter Nduati, Helen Fraser, David Maddock	
S E P T E M B E R	23	Kansas	Trans World Entertainment	David Stevens (director); Spencer Eastman (screenplay); Matt Dillon, Andrew McCarthy, Leslie Hope, Kyra Sedgwick, Arlen Dean Snyder	
S E P T E M B E R	23	Patty Hearst	Atlantic Releasing	Paul Schrader (director); Nicholas Kazan (screenplay); Natasha Richardson, William Forsythe, Ving Rhames, Frances Fisher, Jodi Long, Olivia Barash, Dana Delany, Marek Johnson, Kitty Swink, Pete Kowanko, Tom O'Rourke, Scott Kraft, Ermal Williamson, Elaine Revard, Destiny Reyes Allstun, Jeff Imada	
S E P T E M B E R	23	Spellbinder	MGM/UA Communications Co.	Janet Greek (director); Tracy Tormé (screenplay); Timothy Daly, Kelly Preston, Rick Rossovich, Audra Lindley, Anthony Crivello, Cary-Hiroyuki Tagawa, Diana Bellamy, James Watkins, Kyle T. Heffner, M. C. Gainey, Stefan Gierasch, Roderick Cook	
S E P T E M B E R	23	Sweet Hearts Dance	Tri-Star Pictures	Robert Greenwald (director); Ernest Thompson (screenplay); Don Johnson, Susan Sarandon, Jeff Daniels, Elizabeth Perkins, Kate Reid, Justin Henry, Holly Marie Combs, Bernie Sanders	
S E P T E M B E R	23	Tiger Warsaw	Sony Pictures	Amin Q. Chaudhri (director); Roy London (screenplay); Patrick Swayze, Piper Laurie, Lee Richardson, Mary McDonnell, Barbara Williams, Bobby DiCicco, Kaye Ballard, Thomas Mills Wood, Jenny Chrisinger, James Patrick Gillis, Michelle Glaven, Kevin Bayer, Beeson Carroll, Sally-Jane Heit, Cynthia Lammel, Steve Jaklic	
S E P T E M B E R	24	Daffy Duck's Quackbusters	Warner Bros. Pictures	Greg Ford, Terry Lennon (directors); John W. Dunn, Michael Maltese, Tedd Pierce (screenplay); Mel Blanc, Mel Tormé, Ben Frommer, B. J. Ward, Roy Firestone, Julie Bennett, June Foray, Jeff Bennett	
S E P T E M B E R	30	Bird	Warner Bros. Pictures	Clint Eastwood (director); Joel Oliansky (screenplay); Forest Whitaker, Diane Venora, Michael Zelniker, Samuel E. Wright, Keith David, Michael McGuire, James Handy, Morgan Nagler, Sam Robards, Penelope Windust, Bill Cobbs, Hamilton Camp, John Witherspoon, Tony Todd, Jo de Winter, Anna Thomson, Billy J. Mitchell, Lou Cutell, Jason Bernard, Gretchen Oehler, Richard McKenzie, Tony Cox, Diane Salinger, Tim Russ, Richard Jeni, Don Starr, Damon Whitaker, Arlen Dean Snyder	
S E P T E M B E R	30	Elvira: Mistress of the Dark	New World Pictures	James Signorelli (director); Sam Egan, John Paragon, Cassandra Peterson (screenplay); Cassandra Peterson, W. Morgan Sheppard, Daniel Greene, Susan Kellermann, Edie McClurg, Kurt Fuller, Jeff Conaway, Frank Collison, William Duell, Pat Crawford Brown, Kris Kamm, Ira Heiden, Tress MacNeille, Frank Welker, Robert Benedetti, Ellen Dunning, Scott Morris	
S E P T E M B E R	30	Heartbreak Hotel	Touchstone Pictures	Chris Columbus (director/screenplay); David Keith, Tuesday Weld, Charlie Schlatter, Angela Goethals, Chris Mulkey, Noel Derecki, Dana Barron, T. Graham Brown, Dennis Letts, Blue Deckert, John Hawkes, Jerry Haynes, Al Dvorin	

== October–December ==
Opening		Title	Production company	Cast and crew	Ref.
O C T O B E R	7	Alien Nation	20th Century Fox	Graham Baker (director); Rockne S. O'Bannon (screenplay); James Caan, Mandy Patinkin, Terence Stamp, Kevyn Major Howard, Leslie Bevis, Peter Jason, George Jenesky, Jeff Kober, Roger Aaron Brown, Tony Simotes, Michael David Simms, Ed Krieger, Tony Perez, Brian Thompson, Frank McCarthy, Keone Young, Don Hood	
O C T O B E R	7	Clara's Heart	Warner Bros. Pictures	Robert Mulligan (director); Mark Medoff (screenplay); Whoopi Goldberg, Michael Ontkean, Kathleen Quinlan, Neil Patrick Harris, Spalding Gray, Beverly Todd, Hattie Winston, Jason Downs	
O C T O B E R	7	Imagine: John Lennon	Warner Bros. Pictures	Andrew Solt (director/screenplay); Sam Egan (screenplay); John Lennon, Yoko Ono, Cynthia Lennon, Julian Lennon, Sean Lennon, George Martin, May Pang, Gloria Emerson	
O C T O B E R	7	Memories of Me	Metro-Goldwyn-Mayer	Henry Winkler (director); Billy Crystal, Eric Roth (screenplay); Billy Crystal, Alan King, JoBeth Williams, David Ackroyd, Chris Aable, Phil Fondacaro, Robert Pastorelli, Mark L. Taylor, Larry Cedar, Janet Carroll	
O C T O B E R	7	Punchline	Columbia Pictures	David Seltzer (director/screenplay); Sally Field, Tom Hanks, John Goodman, Mark Rydell, Kim Greist, Paul Mazursky, Pam Matteson, Taylor Negron, Angel Salazar, Damon Wayans, Joycee Katz, Mac Robbins, Max Alexander, Paul Kozlowski, Barry Sobel, Marty Pollio, Katie Rich, Casey Sander, Candace Cameron, George Wallace, Cameron Thor, Bob Zmuda, Susie Essman, George D. Wallace, Mike Starr	
O C T O B E R	14	The Accused	Paramount Pictures	Jonathan Kaplan (director); Tom Topor (screenplay); Jodie Foster, Kelly McGillis, Bernie Coulson, Leo Rossi, Ann Hearn, Carmen Argenziano, Steve Antin, Tom O'Brien, Peter Van Norden, Terry David Mulligan, Woody Brown, Tom Heaton, Andrew Kavadas, Scott Paulin, Tom McBeath, Kim Kondrashoff	
O C T O B E R	14	The Kiss	Tri-Star Pictures	Pen Densham (director); Stephen Volk, Tom Ropelewski, (screenplay); Joanna Pacula, Meredith Salenger, Nicholas Kilbertus, Mimi Kuzyk, Jan Rubeš, Shawn Levy, Sabrina Boudot, Pamela Collyer, Celine Lomez, Richard Dumont, Dorian Joe Clark	
O C T O B E R	14	Another Woman	Orion Pictures	Woody Allen (director/screenplay); Philip Bosco, Betty Buckley, Blythe Danner, Sandy Dennis, Mia Farrow, Gene Hackman, Ian Holm, John Houseman, Martha Plimpton, Gena Rowlands, David Ogden Stiers, Harris Yulin, Frances Conroy, Fred Melamed, Kenneth Welsh, Bruce Jay Friedman, Dana Ivey, Stephen Mailer, Jacques Levy, Josh Hamilton, Kathryn Grody	
O C T O B E R	14	Madame Sousatzka	Universal Pictures / Cineplex Odeon Films	John Schlesinger (director); Ruth Prawer Jhabvala (screenplay); Shirley MacLaine, Peggy Ashcroft, Shabana Azmi, Twiggy, Leigh Lawson, Geoffrey Bayldon, Navin Chowdhry, Robert Rietty, Lee Montague	
O C T O B E R	14	Night of the Demons	International Film Marketing	Kevin S. Tenney (director); Joe Augustyn (screenplay); Cathy Podewell, Amelia Kinkade, Linnea Quigley, Hal Havins, William Gallo, Alvin Alexis, Lance Fenton, Allison Barron, Philip Tanzini, Jill Terashita	
O C T O B E R	14	Pumpkinhead	United Artists / MGM/UA Communications Co.	Stan Winston (director/screenplay); Richard C. Weinman, Gary Gerani, Mark Patrick Carducci (screenplay); Lance Henriksen, John D'Aquino, Jeff East, Kerry Remsen, Kimberly Ross, Buck Flower, Mayim Bialik, Joel Hoffman, Cynthia Bain, Florence Schauffer, Brian Bremer, Matthew Hurley, Lee de Broux, Tom Woodruff Jr.	
O C T O B E R	16	Scooby-Doo and the Ghoul School	Worldvision Enterprises / Hanna-Barbera Productions / Wang Film Productions	Charles A. Nichols, Ray Patterson (directors); Glenn Leopold (screenplay); Don Messick, Casey Kasem, Glynis Johns, Susan Blu, Pat Musick, Russi Taylor, Marilyn Schreffler, Patty Maloney, Frank Welker, Ronnie Schell, Ruta Lee, Remy Auberjonois, Hamilton Camp, Jeff B. Cohen, Aaron Lohr, Scott Menville, Bumper Robinson, Andre Stojka, Zale Kessler	
O C T O B E R	17	Lip Service	HBO Showcase	William H. Macy (director); Howard Korder (screenplay); Griffin Dunne, Paul Dooley, Jonathan Katz, Fran Brill, Felicity Huffman, Colin Stinton, Raynor Scheine, Michael Feingold, John C. Jones, Christopher Kaldor	
O C T O B E R	21	Bat*21	Tri-Star Pictures	Peter Markle (director); William C. Anderson (screenplay); Gene Hackman, Danny Glover, Jerry Reed, David Marshall Grant, Clayton Rohner, Erich Anderson, Joe Dorsey	
O C T O B E R	21	Halloween 4: The Return of Michael Myers	Galaxy International Releasing	Dwight H. Little (director); Alan B. McElroy (screenplay); Donald Pleasence, Ellie Cornell, Danielle Harris, George P. Wilbur, Michael Pataki, Beau Starr, Kathleen Kinmont, Sasha Jenson, Carmen Filpi, Raymond O'Connor, Nancy Borgenicht, Alan B. McElroy	
O C T O B E R	21	Mystic Pizza	The Samuel Goldwyn Company	Donald Petrie (director); Amy Holden Jones, Perry Howze, Randy Howze, Alfred Uhry (screenplay); Annabeth Gish, Julia Roberts, Lili Taylor, Vincent D'Onofrio, William R. Moses, Adam Storke, Conchata Ferrell, Joanna Merlin, Louis Turenne, Janet Zarish, Ann Flood, Suzanne Shepherd, Matt Damon	
O C T O B E R	21	Tapeheads	Avenue Pictures	Bill Fishman (director/screenplay); Peter McCarthy (screenplay); John Cusack, Tim Robbins, Mary Crosby, Clu Gulager, Doug McClure, Katy Boyer, Jessica Walter, Sam Moore, Junior Walker, Susan Tyrrell, Lee Arenberg, Xander Berkeley, "Weird Al" Yankovic, Don Cornelius, King Cotton, Zander Schloss, Martha C. Quinn, Ted Nugent, Jello Biafra, Connie Stevens, Stiv Bators, Bobcat Goldthwait, David Anthony Higgins, Michael Nesmith, Sy Richardson, Brie Howard, Billy Davis	
O C T O B E R	21	Things Change	Columbia Pictures	David Mamet (director/screenplay); Shel Silverstein (screenplay); Don Ameche, Joe Mantegna, Robert Prosky, Mike Nussbaum, J. J. Johnston, Ricky Jay, Jonathan Katz	
O C T O B E R	21	Without a Clue	Orion Pictures	Thom Eberhardt (director); Larry Strawther, Gary Murphy (screenplay); Michael Caine, Ben Kingsley, Jeffrey Jones, Lysette Anthony, Paul Freeman, Pat Keen, Matthew Savage, Nigel Davenport, Tim Killick, Peter Cook, John Warner, Matthew Sim, Fredrick Fox, Harold Innocent, George Sweeney, Murray Ewan, Jennifer Guy	
O C T O B E R	28	Feds	Warner Bros. Pictures	Daniel Goldberg (director/screenplay); Len Blum (screenplay); Rebecca De Mornay, Mary Gross, Ken Marshall, Fred Dalton Thompson, Larry Cedar, Raymond Singer, James Luisi, Rex Ryon, Norman Bernard, Don Stark, David Sherrill	
O C T O B E R	29	Moonwalker	Warner Bros. Pictures / Lorimar Motion Pictures / MJJ Productions / Ultimate Productions / Will Vinton Productions	Jerry Kramer, Jim Blashfield, Colin Chilvers (directors); David Newman (screenplay); Michael Jackson, Joe Pesci, Sean Lennon, Brandon Quintin Adams, Clancy Brown, Paul Reubens, Ladysmith Black Mambazo, TJ Jackson, Taryll Jackson, Nikki Cox, The Boys, Pons Maar, Kellie Parker, Jermaine La Jaune Jackson Jr.	
N O V E M B E R	4	Everybody's All-American	Warner Bros. Pictures	Taylor Hackford (director); Thomas Rickman (screenplay); Jessica Lange, Dennis Quaid, Timothy Hutton, John Goodman, Carl Lumbly, Ray Baker, Savannah Smith Boucher, Patricia Clarkson, Wayne Knight	
N O V E M B E R	4	The Good Mother	Touchstone Pictures	Leonard Nimoy (director); Michael Bortman (screenplay); Diane Keaton, Liam Neeson, Jason Robards, Ralph Bellamy, Teresa Wright, James Naughton, Asia Vieira, Joe Morton, Katey Sagal, Zachary Bennett, Eugene Clark, Joyce Gordon, Tracy Griffith, Charles Kimbrough, Fred Melamed, Karl Pruner, Matt Damon	
N O V E M B E R	4	U2: Rattle and Hum (U.S.)	Paramount Pictures	Phil Joanou (director); U2, B. B. King, Phil Joanou, Satan and Adam, The Memphis Horns, Joseph M. Miskulin	
N O V E M B E R	4	They Live	Universal Pictures	John Carpenter (director/screenplay); Roddy Piper, Keith David, Meg Foster, Raymond St. Jacques, George Buck Flower, Peter Jason, Sy Richardson, Susan Blanchard, Norman Alden, Norman D. Wilson, Larry Franco, Gregory J. Barnett, Kerry Rossall, Jeff Imada, John Carpenter, Al Leong, Matt McColm, Tommy Morrison, Jeb Stuart Adams	
N O V E M B E R	9	Child's Play	United Artists / MGM/UA Communications Co.	Tom Holland (director/screenplay); Don Mancini, John Lafia (screenplay); Catherine Hicks, Chris Sarandon, Alex Vincent, Brad Dourif, Dinah Manoff, Tommy Swerdlow, Jack Colvin, Neil Giuntoli, Alan Wilder, Edan Gross, John Franklin, Ed Gale, Raymond Wilder, Aaron Osborne, Juan Ramirez	
N O V E M B E R	11	Evil Angels	Warner Bros. Pictures	Fred Schepisi (director/screenplay); Robert Caswell (screenplay); Meryl Streep, Sam Neill, Bruce Myles, Neil Fitzpatrick, Charles 'Bud' Tingwell, Maurie Fields, Nick Tate, Lewis Fitz-Gerald, Dorothy Alison, Ruby Hunter, Vincent Gil, Maureen Edwards, Mark Mitchell, Ian Gilmour	
N O V E M B E R	11	Distant Thunder	Paramount Pictures	Rick Rosenthal (director); Robert Stitzel, Deedee Wehle (screenplay); John Lithgow, Ralph Macchio, Kerrie Keane, Reb Brown, Janet Margolin, Denis Arndt, Jamey Sheridan, Tom Bower, John Kelly, Michael Currie, Hilary Strang, Robyn Stevan, David Longworth, Gordon Currie, Walter Marsh, Allen Lysell, Kate Robbins, David Glyn-Jones, Denalda Williams	
N O V E M B E R	11	Ernest Saves Christmas	Touchstone Pictures	John R. Cherry III (director); Ed Turner, B. Kline (screenplay); Jim Varney, Douglas Seale, Oliver Clark, Noelle Parker, Gailard Sartain, Bill Byrge, Billie Bird, Key Howard, Jack Swanson, Buddy Douglas, Patty Maloney, Barry Brazell, George Kaplan, Robert Lesser, Zachary Bowden	
N O V E M B E R	11	Far North	Nelson Entertainment / Alive Films	Sam Shepard (director/screenplay); Jessica Lange, Charles Durning, Tess Harper, Donald Moffat, Ann Wedgeworth, Patricia Arquette, Nina Draxten	
N O V E M B E R	11	Iron Eagle II	Tri-Star Pictures / Carolco Pictures	Sidney J. Furie (director/screenplay); Kevin Alyn Elders (screenplay); Louis Gossett Jr., Mark Humphrey, Stuart Margolin, Maury Chaykin, Alan Scarfe, Colm Feore, Sharon Brandon, Clark Johnson, Jason Blicker, Jesse Collins, Mark Ivanir, Uri Gavriel, Neil Munro, Douglas Sheldon, Gary Reineke, Michael J. Reynolds, Jason Gedrick, Azaria Rapaport, Nicolas Coucos	
N O V E M B E R	11	Spike of Bensonhurst	FilmDallas	Paul Morrissey (director/screenplay); Alan Bowne (screenplay); Sasha Mitchell, Ernest Borgnine, Anne De Salvo, Talisa Soto, Rick Aviles, Rodney Harvey, Sylvia Miles, Maria Pitillo, Geraldine Smith, Frank Adonis, Frank Gio	
N O V E M B E R	11	Split Decisions	New Century Entertainment	David Drury (director); David Fallon (screenplay); Craig Sheffer, Jeff Fahey, Jennifer Beals, John McLiam, Gene Hackman, Harry Van Dyke, Eddie Velez	
N O V E M B E R	13	Scooby-Doo and the Reluctant Werewolf	Worldvision Enterprises / Hanna-Barbera Productions	Ray Patterson (director); Jim Ryan (screenplay); Don Messick, Casey Kasem, Hamilton Camp, B. J. Ward, Rob Paulsen, Frank Welker, Alan Oppenheimer, Pat Musick, Ed Gilbert, Jim Cummings, Joan Gerber, Brian Stokes Mitchell	
N O V E M B E R	13	Cherry 2000	Orion Pictures	Steve De Jarnatt (director); Michael Almereyda (screenplay); Melanie Griffith, David Andrews, Tim Thomerson, Pamela Gidley, Harry Carey Jr., Jennifer Mayo, Ben Johnson, Brion James, Marshall Bell, Larry Fishburne, Michael C. Gwynne, Jack Thibeau, Robert Z'Dar, Jennifer Balgobin, Cameron Milzer	
N O V E M B E R	18	The Chocolate War	MCEG Sterling	Keith Gordon (director/screenplay); John Glover, Ilan Mitchell-Smith, Wally Ward, Doug Hutchison, Jenny Wright, Bud Cort, Corey Gunnestad, Brent Fraser, Robert Davenport, Adam Baldwin, Ethan Sandler	
N O V E M B E R	18	Fresh Horses	Columbia Pictures / Weintraub Entertainment Group	David Anspaugh (director); Larry Ketron (screenplay); Molly Ringwald, Andrew McCarthy, Patti D'Arbanville, Ben Stiller, Leon Russom, Molly Hagan, Viggo Mortensen, Doug Hutchison, Dan Davis, John Powell	
N O V E M B E R	18	High Spirits	Tri-Star Pictures	Neil Jordan (director/screenplay); Michael McDowell (screenplay); Daryl Hannah, Peter O'Toole, Steve Guttenberg, Beverly D'Angelo, Liam Neeson, Jennifer Tilly, Peter Gallagher, Ray McAnally, Martin Ferrero, Connie Booth, Donal McCann, Liz Smith, Mary Coughlan, Ruby Buchanan, Isolde Cazelet, Aimée Delamain, Tom Hickey, Krista Hornish, Little John, Preston Lockwood, Paul O'Sullivan, Hilary Reynolds, Tony Rohr, Matthew Wright	
N O V E M B E R	18	The Land Before Time	Universal Pictures / Sullivan Bluth Studios / Amblin Entertainment	Don Bluth (director); Stu Krieger (screenplay); Gabriel Damon, Candace Hutson, Judith Barsi, Will Ryan, Helen Shaver, Burke Byrnes, Bill Irwin, Pat Hingle, John Lasseter, Frank Welker	
N O V E M B E R	18	Last Rites	MGM/UA Communications Co.	Donald P. Bellisario (director/screenplay); Tom Berenger, Daphne Zuniga, Chick Vennera, Anne Twomey, Dane Clark, Paul Dooley, Adrian Paul, Deborah Pratt, Al Rodrigo, Father Louis Gigante, Tony Lip, Damien Leake, Troian Avery Bellisario, Michaelangelo Bellisario, Vassili Lambrinos, Tony DiBenedetto, Christine Poor, Jack Hallett, Ibi Kaufman, Frank Patton III, Maurizio Benazzo, Roberto Corbo, Leslie Arnett, Anthony Bishop	
N O V E M B E R	18	1969	Atlantic Entertainment Group	Ernest Thompson (director/screenplay); Robert Downey Jr., Kiefer Sutherland, Bruce Dern, Mariette Hartley, Winona Ryder, Joanna Cassidy	
N O V E M B E R	18	Oliver & Company	Walt Disney Pictures	George Scribner (director); Jim Cox, Tim Disney, James Mangold (screenplay); Joey Lawrence, Billy Joel, Cheech Marin, Richard Mulligan, Roscoe Lee Browne, Sheryl Lee Ralph, Dom DeLuise, Taurean Blacque, Carl Weintraub, Robert Loggia, Natalie Gregory, William Glover, Bette Midler, Frank Welker, Jonathan Brandis, Greg Finley, Jo Ann Harris, Rosanna Huffman, Harvey Jason, Karen Kamon, Kaleena Kiff, Carol King, David Lasley, John McCurry, Whitney Rydbeck, Tom Righter Snow, Ruth Pointer	
N O V E M B E R	20	Yogi and the Invasion of the Space Bears	Worldvision Enterprises / Hanna-Barbera Productions	Don Lusk, Ray Patterson (directors); Neal Barbera (screenplay); Daws Butler, Don Messick, Julie Bennett, Susan Blu, Sorrell Booke, Victoria Carroll, Townsend Coleman, Peter Cullen, Linda Harmon, Maggie Roswell, Rob Paulsen, Michael Rye, Frank Welker, Patric Zimmerman	
N O V E M B E R	23	Buster	Metro-Goldwyn-Mayer / Vestron Pictures	David Green (director); Colin Shindler (screenplay); Phil Collins, Julie Walters, Larry Lamb, Martin Jarvis, Sheila Hancock, Stephanie Lawrence, Michael Attwell, Ralph Brown, Anthony Quayle, Ellie Beaven, Christopher Ellison, Michael Byrne, Clive Wood, Harold Innocent, Rupert Vansittart, John Benfield, John Barrard, Carole Collins, Amy Shindler, David Shindler	
N O V E M B E R	23	Cocoon: The Return	20th Century Fox	Daniel Petrie (director); Stephen McPherson (screenplay); Don Ameche, Wilford Brimley, Courteney Cox, Hume Cronyn, Jack Gilford, Steve Guttenberg, Barret Oliver, Maureen Stapleton, Elaine Stritch, Jessica Tandy, Gwen Verdon, Tahnee Welch, Linda Harrison, Tyrone Power Jr., Mike Nomad, Herta Ware, Brian Dennehy	
N O V E M B E R	23	Full Moon in Blue Water	Trans World Entertainment	Peter Masterson (director); Bill Bozzone (screenplay); Gene Hackman, Teri Garr, Burgess Meredith, Elias Koteas, Kevin Cooney, David Doty, Gil Glasgow, Becky Gelke, Marietta Marich, Lexie Masterson, Mark Walters, Ben Jones, Tiny Skaggs, Bill Johnson	
N O V E M B E R	23	Hanna's War	Cannon Films	Menahem Golan (director/screenplay); Stanley Mann (screenplay); Ellen Burstyn, Maruschka Detmers, Anthony Andrews, Donald Pleasence, David Warner, Vincent Riotta, Avi Korein, Ingrid Pitt, John Stride, Shimon Finkel	
N O V E M B E R	23	Scrooged	Paramount Pictures	Richard Donner (director); Mitch Glazer, Michael O'Donoghue (screenplay); Bill Murray, Karen Allen, John Forsythe, John Glover, Bobcat Goldthwait, David Johansen, Carol Kane, Robert Mitchum, Michael J. Pollard, Alfre Woodard, Mabel King, Jamie Farr, Robert Goulet, Buddy Hackett, John Houseman, Lee Majors, Pat McCormick, Brian Doyle-Murray, Mary Lou Retton, Jean Speegle Howard, June Chandler, Mary Ellen Trainor, Bruce Jarchow, Peter Bromilow, Lester Wilson, Jack McGee, Kathy Kinney, Tony Steedman, Rebeca Arthur, Selma Archerd, Roy Brocksmith, Sachi Parker, Delores Hall, Anne Ramsey, Logan Ramsey, Wendie Malick, Joel Murray, Mitch Glazer, Maria Riva, Michael O'Donoghue, Amy Hill, Miles Davis, Larry Carlton, David Sanborn, Paul Shaffer, Solid Gold Dancers, Don LaFontaine, John Murray, Nicholas Phillips, Al 'Red Dog' Weber, Michael Eidam, Kate McGregor-Stewart, Lisa Mende, Ryan Todd, Chaz Conner Jr.	
N O V E M B E R	27	A Dangerous Life	HBO / ITC Entertainment	Robert Markowitz (director); David Williamson (screenplay); Gary Busey, Rebecca Gilling, James Handy, Roy Alvarez, Jaime Fabregas, Dina Bonnevie, Spanky Manikan, Grace Parr, Ruben Rustia, Laurice Guillen, Tessie Tomas, Joonee Gamboa, Johnny Delgado, Rez Cortez, Rolando Tinio, Noel Trinidad, Vic Diaz, Freddie Santos, Michael Pate, Pen Medina, Tony Mabesa, Junix Inocian, Mona Lisa, Benigno Aquino Jr., Guy Stone, Alexander Cortez, Arthur Sherman, Dido de la Paz, Val Victa, Cris Vertido, Robert Talabis, Mervyn Samson, Ray Ventura, Tony Carreon, Amiel Leonardia, Lea Cabusi, Felindo Obach, Odette Khan, Joe Gruta, Dave Brodette, Zeneida Amador, Ernie Zarate, Pudji Waseso	
D E C E M B E R	2	Dakota	Miramax	Fred Holmes (director); Darryl Kuntz, Sara Lynn Kuntz (screenplay); Lou Diamond Phillips, Lawrence Montaigne, John Hawkes, Herta Ware, Ben Jones, Rodger Boyce, Jordan Burton, Eli Cummins, DeeDee Norton, Steve Ruge, Tom Campitelli, Leslie Mullin, Connie Coit, Susan Crippin, Robert Lemus, Cecilia Flores	
D E C E M B E R	2	The Naked Gun: From the Files of Police Squad!	Paramount Pictures	David Zucker (director/screenplay); Jerry Zucker, Jim Abrahams, Pat Proft (screenplay); Leslie Nielsen, Priscilla Presley, Ricardo Montalbán, George Kennedy, O. J. Simpson, Nancy Marchand, Raye Birk, Jeannette Charles, Ed Williams, Tiny Ron Taylor, "Weird Al" Yankovic, Joe Grifasi, Tom Dugan, Lawrence Tierney, Reggie Jackson, Jay Johnstone, Joe West, Doug Harvey, Ken Kaiser, Ron Luciano, Curt Gowdy, Jim Palmer, Tim McCarver, Mel Allen, Dick Enberg, Dick Vitale, Dr. Joyce Brothers, Mark Holton, John Houseman, Jesse Ventura, Robert K. Weiss, Winifred Freedman, Nicholas Worth, Charlotte Zucker, Ken Minyard, Bob Herron, Conrad Palmisano, Brinke Stevens, Tom Willett, Susan Beaubian, Leslie Maier, Tony Brafa, Hank Robinson	
D E C E M B E R	2	Tequila Sunrise	Warner Bros. Pictures	Robert Towne (director/screenplay); Mel Gibson, Michelle Pfeiffer, Kurt Russell, Raul Julia, J. T. Walsh, Gabriel Damon, Ely Pouget, Arliss Howard, Arye Gross, Garret Pearson, Budd Boetticher, Ann Magnuson	
D E C E M B E R	2	Watchers	Universal Pictures / Carolco Pictures	Jon Hess (director); Bill Freed, Damian Lee (screenplay); Corey Haim, Barbara Williams, Michael Ironside, Lala Sloatman	
D E C E M B E R	9	Mississippi Burning	Orion Pictures	Alan Parker (director); Chris Gerolmo (screenplay); Gene Hackman, Willem Dafoe, Frances McDormand, Brad Dourif, R. Lee Ermey, Gailard Sartain, Stephen Tobolowsky, Michael Rooker, Pruitt Taylor Vince, Badja Djola, Kevin Dunn, Frankie Faison, Geoffrey Nauffts, Park Overall, Darius McCrary, Tobin Bell, Bob Glaudini	
D E C E M B E R	9	My Stepmother Is an Alien	Columbia Pictures / Weintraub Entertainment Group	Richard Benjamin (director); Herschel Weingrod, Timothy Harris, Jonathan Reynolds (screenplay); Dan Aykroyd, Kim Basinger, Jon Lovitz, Alyson Hannigan, Joseph Maher, Seth Green, Ann Prentiss, Wesley Mann, Tony Jay, Harry Shearer, Juliette Lewis, Peter Bromilow	
D E C E M B E R	9	Twins	Universal Pictures	Ivan Reitman (director); William Davies, Timothy Harris, William Osborne, Herschel Weingrod (screenplay); Arnold Schwarzenegger, Danny DeVito, Kelly Preston, Chloe Webb, Bonnie Bartlett, David Caruso, Trey Wilson, Marshall Bell, Tony Jay, Hugh O'Brian, Nehemiah Persoff, Maury Chaykin, Tom McCleister, David Efron, Sven-Ole Thorsen, Gus Rethwisch, Richard Portnow, Robert Harper, Peter Dvorsky, Rosemary Dunsmore, S.A. Griffin, Frances Bay, Marvin J. McIntyre, Cary-Hiroyuki Tagawa, Jay Arlen Jones, Ty Granderson Jones, Elizabeth Kaitan, Jason Reitman, Catherine Reitman, Linda Porter, Joe Medjuck, John Michael Bolger, Steve Reevis, Jeff Beck, Terry Bozzio, Nicolette Larson, Heather Graham	
D E C E M B E R	12	The Christmas Wife	HBO Showcase	David Jones (director); Catherine Ann Jones (screenplay); Jason Robards, Julie Harris, Don Francks, James Eckhouse, Patricia Hamilton, Deborah Grover, David Gardner, Tom Harvey, Christopher Andrade, Steven Andrade, Bill Lynn	
D E C E M B E R	14	Dirty Rotten Scoundrels	Orion Pictures	Frank Oz (director); Dale Launer, Stanley Shapiro, Paul Henning (screenplay); Steve Martin, Michael Caine, Glenne Headly, Anton Rodgers, Barbara Harris, Ian McDiarmid, Dana Ivey, Meagen Fay, Frances Conroy, Louis Zorich	
D E C E M B E R	14	I'm Gonna Git You Sucka	MGM/UA Communications Co. / United Artists	Keenen Ivory Wayans (director/screenplay); Keenen Ivory Wayans, John Witherspoon, Bernie Casey, Ja'net Dubois, Isaac Hayes, Jim Brown, Antonio Fargas, Steve James, John Vernon, Dawnn Lewis, Kadeem Hardison, Damon Wayans, Kim Wayans, Nadia Wayans, Chris Rock, Anne-Marie Johnson, Eve Plumb, Tony Cox, Hawthorne James, Clarence Williams III, David Alan Grier, Robin Harris, Marlon Wayans, Shawn Wayans, Gary Owens, Lawrence Parker, Derrick Jones	
D E C E M B E R	14	Torch Song Trilogy	New Line Cinema	Paul Bogart (director); Harvey Fierstein (screenplay); Anne Bancroft, Matthew Broderick, Harvey Fierstein, Brian Kerwin, Karen Young, Eddie Castrodad, Ken Page, Charles Pierce, Axel Vera	
D E C E M B E R	16	Haunted Summer	Cannon Films	Ivan Passer (director) Lewis John Carlino (screenplay); Philip Anglim, Laura Dern, Alice Krige, Eric Stoltz, Alex Winter	
D E C E M B E R	16	Purple People Eater	Motion Picture Corporation of America	Linda Shayne (director/screenplay); Neil Patrick Harris, Ned Beatty, Shelley Winters, Thora Birch, Dustin Diamond, Peggy Lipton, Linda Talcott, Bobby Porter, Jimmy Locust, Tim Lawrence, Chubby Checker, Little Richard, James Houghton, John Brumfield, Molly Cheek, Kimberly McCullough, Sheb Wooley, Shonda Whipple, Lindsay Price, Katie Gonzalez, Nikki Cox	
D E C E M B E R	16	Rain Man	United Artists / MGM/UA Communications Co.	Barry Levinson (director); Barry Morrow, Ronald Bass (screenplay); Dustin Hoffman, Tom Cruise, Valeria Golino, Jerry Molen, Jack Murdock, Michael D. Roberts, Lucinda Jenney, Bonnie Hunt, Beth Grant, Ray Baker, Jake Hoffman, Royce D. Applegate, Anna Mathias, Archie Hahn, Luisa Leschin, Ira Miller, Chris Mulkey, Tracy Newman, Julie Payne, Reni Santoni, Jonathan Stark, Lynne Marie Stewart, Gigi Vorgan, Barry Levinson, Ralph Seymour, June Christopher, Bridget Sienna, Ruth Silveira, Arnold F. Turner	
D E C E M B E R	18	Dead Solid Perfect	HBO Pictures	Bobby Roth (director/screenplay); Randy Quaid, Kathryn Harrold, Jack Warden, Corinne Bohrer, Brett Cullen, Larry Riley, DeLane Matthews, John M. Jackson, Bibi Besch, John Durbin, Ron Hayes, Peter Jacobsen, Lindy Miller, Don Morrow, Rob Nilsson, Mac O'Grady, Keith Olbermann, Annie O'Neill, Henry G. Sanders, David Schickele, Dan Jenkins, Bob Harrison, Dixie K. Wade, Dick Rudolph	
D E C E M B E R	21	Beaches	Touchstone Pictures	Garry Marshall (director); Mary Agnes Donoghue (screenplay); Bette Midler, Barbara Hershey, John Heard, Spalding Gray, James Read, Lainie Kazan, Grace Johnston, Lynda Goodfriend, Tracy Reiner, Jenifer Lewis, Joe Grifasi, Phil Leeds, Hector Elizondo, Garry Marshall, Marc Shaiman, Mayim Bialik, Marcie Leeds	
D E C E M B E R	21	Dangerous Liaisons	Warner Bros. Pictures / Lorimar Motion Pictures	Stephen Frears (director); Christopher Hampton (screenplay); Glenn Close, John Malkovich, Michelle Pfeiffer, Swoosie Kurtz, Keanu Reeves, Mildred Natwick, Uma Thurman, Peter Capaldi, Valerie Gogan	
D E C E M B E R	21	Talk Radio	Universal Pictures	Oliver Stone (director/screenplay); Eric Bogosian (screenplay); Eric Bogosian, Alec Baldwin, Ellen Greene, Leslie Hope, John C. McGinley, John Pankow, Michael Wincott, Robert Trebor, Tony Frank, Anna Levine, Rockets Redglare, Park Overall, Earl Hindman, Zach Grenier, Bill Johnson, Bruno Rubeo, Pirie MacDonald, Allan Corduner, Daniel Escobar	
D E C E M B E R	21	Working Girl	20th Century Fox	Mike Nichols (director); Kevin Wade (screenplay); Melanie Griffith, Harrison Ford, Sigourney Weaver, Alec Baldwin, Joan Cusack, Philip Bosco, Nora Dunn, Oliver Platt, James Lally, Kevin Spacey, Robert Easton, Olympia Dukakis, Amy Aquino, Jeffrey Nordling, Elizabeth Whitcraft, David Duchovny, Caroline Aaron, Zach Grenier, Barbara Garrick, Ricki Lake, Marceline A. Hugot, Timothy Carhart	
D E C E M B E R	23	The Accidental Tourist	Warner Bros. Pictures	Lawrence Kasdan (director/screenplay); Frank Galati (screenplay); William Hurt, Kathleen Turner, Geena Davis, Bill Pullman, Amy Wright, David Ogden Stiers, Ed Begley Jr.	
D E C E M B E R	23	The Boost	Hemdale Film Corporation	Harold Becker (director); Ben Stein, Darryl Ponicsan (screenplay); James Woods, Sean Young, John Kapelos, Steven Hill, Kelle Kerr, John Rothman, Amanda Blake, Barry Jenner	
D E C E M B E R	23	Dominick and Eugene	Orion Pictures	Robert M. Young (director); Corey Blechman, Alvin Sargent (screenplay); Tom Hulce, Ray Liotta, Jamie Lee Curtis, Todd Graff, Bill Cobbs, David Strathairn	
D E C E M B E R	23	Hellbound: Hellraiser II	New World Pictures	Tony Randel (director); Peter Atkins (screenplay); Clare Higgins, Ashley Laurence, Kenneth Cranham, Imogen Boorman, Doug Bradley, Nicholas Vince, Simon Bamford, Barbie Wilde, Sean Chapman, Oliver Smith, William Hope, Deborah Joel, Angus McInnes, Catherine Chevalier, Kevin Cole	

== See also ==
- List of 1988 box office number-one films in the United States
- 1988 in the United States
