= GamePro TV =

American television series

- Presented by: J. D. Roth (1991–94); Brennan Howard (1991–92); Michael Komessar (1998–99)
- Country of origin: United States
- Original language: English

Production
- Running time: 22 minutes
- Production companies: Pye/Jaffe Productions (Note: Later as Jaffe Productions.) (1991–94); Kelly News & Entertainment (1991–92); Timeline Productions (1996–99)

Original release
- Network: Syndication
- Release: 28 September 1991 – 1992
- Network: Sci-Fi Channel (Note: Episodes aired once a month on USA Network starting January 2nd, 1993.)
- Release: 26 September 1992 – 1993
- Network: SportsChannel (Note: Show later moved to Fox Sports Net.)
- Release: 6 September 1996 – 1999

GamePro TV was a syndicated weekly video game television show that ran from 1991 through 1992. The show was a tie-in to GamePro magazine.

== History ==
=== First-run syndication version ===
Hosted by J. D. Roth (and, initially, co-host Brennan Howard), the program showcased many new and upcoming video games, largely for the NES, Super NES, Game Boy, Sega Genesis and TurboGrafx-16 systems. Viewers could send in recordings of themselves explaining tips and codes for games, one of which was chosen to be shown in each of the early episodes. Viewer mail was also frequently answered on-air.

=== Paid advertisement version ===
After its initial cancellation as a syndicated weekly series, GamePro TV was reborn as a paid advertisement program. The infomercial version of GameProTV consistently ran a 1-800 number along the bottom of the screen inviting viewers to subscribe to GamePro magazine. These episodes utilized the same sets as the syndicated program and retained J. D. Roth as host, but removed the option for viewers to send in tips or questions by mail. The half-hour ads ran for less than a year before GamePro TV finally vanished from the airwaves.

=== SportsChannel version ===
In 1996, GamePro TV returned to the airwaves, this time with a narrator (later in 1998, hosted by Michael Komessar) and a largely different format. This version of the show was produced by Timeline Productions and aired on SportsChannel (and later on Fox Sports Net affiliates.) Reviews, previews, tips and interviews with press and developers were present in this version, utilizing the same themes and formats from the magazine. Review scores were lifted directly from the magazine as well. However, this version was short-lived, airing only a few episodes before its cancellation in early 1999. Timeline Productions would continue the show as GameZcene on Fox Sports Net, which ran until 2000.

=== GamePro Minute ===
In 2003, a new abbreviated version of GamePro TV titled the GamePro Minute appeared on the short-lived series GSN Video Games on Game Show Network.

== See also ==
- Bad Influence!
- GamesMaster
- Starcade
- Video Power
- Video & Arcade Top 10
