= Sam Winans =

American film and television composer

Sam Winans is an American film and television composer. He studied music theory in college and privately with Merv Kennedy, a jazz musician, and then studied orchestration with Spud Murphy, creator of the Equal Interval System (EIS). His music has appeared on TV shows such as Lizzie McGuire, Harts of the West, Flight 29 Down, Happily Ever After: Fairy Tales for Every Child, and Kids Incorporated, and the 1988 animated feature Pound Puppies and the Legend of Big Paw.

He also composed the 1995 fanfare of the Buena Vista Television logo and reorchestrated once in 2005 and later in 2007, when it was rebranded to Disney-ABC Domestic Television, then later known as Disney-ABC Home Entertainment and Television Distribution, which was then carried over to Disney Media Distribution, which was rebranded to Disney Platform Distribution.
