= Richard Kosinski =

Richard Kosinski is a keyboard player who did music for Pound Puppies and the Legend of Big Paw and the Hanna-Barbera series Gravedale High. Early in his career, he was a member of the Detroit rock band, Sunday Funnies, and also contributed to albums by Bonnie Raitt, The Temptations, the Four Tops and Aretha Franklin. He was a member of the soft rock ensemble Wha-Koo from 1977-1979.
