= Pound Puppies and the Legend of Big Paw =

1988 animated film by Pierre DeCelles

- Theatrical release poster
- Directed by: Pierre DeCelles
- Written by: Jim Carlson; Terrence McDonnell
- Based on: Pound Puppies; Tonka
- Produced by: Donald Kushner; Peter Locke; Diana Dru Botsford
- Starring: Brennan Howard; B. J. Ward; Nancy Cartwright; Tony Longo
- Edited by: John Blizek
- Music by: Richard Kosinski; Sam Winans; Bill Reichenbach Jr. Ashley Hall; Bob Mann
- Production companies: Carolco Pictures; Family Home Entertainment; Atlantic Entertainment Group; Kushner-Locke Company; The Maltese Companies; Wang Film Productions; Tonka
- Distributed by: Tri-Star Pictures
- Release date: March 18, 1988
- Running time: 77 minutes
- Country: United States
- Language: English
- Budget: $6 million
- Box office: $586,938

Pound Puppies and the Legend of Big Paw is a 1988 American animated musical adventure film based on the Tonka toyline and the Hanna-Barbera television series of the same name, which had debuted two years before the film was released. It was directed by Pierre DeCelles, and stars the voices of Brennan Howard, B. J. Ward and Tony Longo. This was the only animated feature film produced by Carolco Pictures as well as the first animated film distributed by Tri-Star Pictures.

The Legend of Big Paw was the final theatrically released animated feature from the late 1980s to promote a major toyline, a common trend in the American cartoon industry of the time. The film received negative reviews from critics and audiences alike and was a major box office bomb, grossing only $586,938 against a $6 million budget.

== Plot ==
On Whopper's way to the museum with his niece and nephew, he tells them about the origin of Puppy Power, the ability of humans to communicate with the Pound Puppies and Purries.

In the Dark Ages, specifically the 950's AD, a boy, named Arthur, and his dog, Digalot came across a stone which contained both the mythical sword, Excalibur and the magical Bone of Scone. After Arthur had pulled the sword from the stone, Digalot had pulled the Bone of Scone from the stone, and soon afterward Arthur and Digalot discovered that they could now understand one another.

Sir McNasty, the Black Knight, who had witnessed the withdrawals and Arthur's coronation as King of England, had planned to conquer the world by retrieving the bone, but it was kept hidden by the giant guardian, Big Paw.

In the 1950's, the Bone of Scone is in a museum in an unnamed American city. Pound owners, Tammy and Jeff, hold a press conference to announce that the pound will be holding an adoption bazaar in commemoration of the bone's thousand-year anniversary. The direct descendant of Sir McNasty, Marvin McNasty arrives at the pound, wishing to adopt some puppies.

Whopper discovers McNasty's true intentions; McNasty will use his Mean Machine to transform the puppies into vicious guard dogs, steal the Bone of Scone, and use its power and his canine army to conquer the world.

Whopper attempts to warn his friends, but their leader, who is the direct descendant of Digalot, Cooler does not believe him at all, because Whopper has a habit of telling tall tales. Whopper then follows McNasty's henchmen as they attempt to steal the Bone of Scone, but they accidentally break it in two, resulting in the loss of Puppy Power.

Whopper takes one half of the bone with him back to the pound, only for the henchmen to kidnap him and Collette, and take the half of the bone. Cooler and the rest of the Pound Puppies head out to rescue them and retrieve the stolen half.

Collette and Whopper escape from McNasty's lab, and briefly reunite with the rest of the Puppies, but McNasty's henchmen recapture them. The Puppies give chase, but almost all of them end up in a rat-infested cave, hanging on a rope, before the Purries pull them up to safety. The Puppies and Purries continue looking for their friends. When they get caught in a patch of mire, they are saved by the legendary Big Paw, who agrees to help them.

When the Puppies try to enter McNasty's house, they are captured and transformed into guard dogs, except for Cooler, who escapes by posing as a Purry, as McNasty is allergic to cats. Big Paw brings him and the Purries back to town to stop the evil trio, who have taken over the pound and dug their way into the museum where the villains glue the bone back together, restoring Puppy Power. Big Paw and Cooler arrive and the rest of the Puppies are turned back to normal when they hear the words "I love you".

McNasty and his henchmen try to escape with the bone, but Big Paw and Cooler chase them back to the museum, where the Mean Machine turns the villains into good men. Big Paw and Nose Marie retrieve the Bone of Scone.

Whopper, and his niece and nephew find themselves in the museum. The Bone of Scone has returned for another visit, and Whopper introduces Big Paw as a surprise for the young ones, who did not believe before that he was real.

== Cast ==
=== Pound Puppies and Pound Purries ===
- Brennan Howard as
  - Cooler, a Beagle, who is the leader of the Pound Puppies, and teams up with the other Puppies and Purries to help solve the mystery of the Bone of Scone. Cooler is also a direct descendant of Digalot.
  - Digalot, the ancestor of Cooler, who is owned by King Arthur. Digalot pulls out the Bone of Scone in the Dark Ages segment.
  - Ashley Hall provides Cooler's singing voice.
- Ruth Buzzi as Nose Marie, a Bloodhound, who has a very keen sense of smell and always "knows what the nose knows".
- Hal Rayle as Howler, a Jack Russell Terrier, who is an inventor, who always utters out his namesake, and helps spread the word about the "puppynapping" with his Grapevine".
  - Rayle also voices Reflex, a Schnoodle and Old English Sheepdog mix breed, who turns lovesick, whenever a bell rings, kissing everyone he meets and shouting "I love you!" every time, and is later on used to turn the other Puppies back to normal.
  - Frank Welker provides his howling vocals.
- B. J. Ward as Whopper, a mischievous Golden Retriever Pupling, who gets into trouble with Marvin McNasty. As an adult, he shares the story of Puppy Power with his niece and nephew at the beginning, and at the end of the film.
- Nancy Cartwright as Bright Eyes, a Cavalier King Charles Spaniel, who is the cheerleader among the group, and stamps out papers during the Adoption Bazaar as the film ends.
- Cathy Cavadini as Collette, an American Cocker Spaniel and the mother of six Puplings. Along with Whopper, she gets kidnapped by McNasty. Her Puplings come to the rescue later in the film.
- Greg Berg as Beamer, a cheerful, carefree and laid-back Scottish Terrier.
- Susan Silo as Florence, an Australian Cattle Dog nurse who announces, and attends to, the birth of Colette's Puplings.
- Tony Longo as Big Paw, a Newfoundland and Old English Sheepdog mix breed, who is the guardian of the Bone of Scone. He is introduced to the dogs and cats as a lonely puppy, who is homeless and has no friends.
  - Mark Vieha provides Big Paw's singing voice.
- Frank Welker and Cathy Cavadini as Hairball and Charlamange, respectively. They are the Pound Purries.

=== Humans ===
- George Rose as Marvin McNasty, the film's villain, and a descendant of Sir McNasty. Like his ancestors, he has always wanted to conquer the world with the Bone. He is also allergic to cats.
  - Rose also voices Sir McNasty, an evil knight from the Dark Ages segment.
- Wayne Scherzer and Frank Welker as Lumpy and Bones, respectively. They are McNasty's two clumsy henchmen.
- Janice Kawaye and Joey Dedio as Tammy and Jeff, two teenagers who run the Puppies' Pound and the Adoption Bazaar.
- James Swodec as King Arthur, a boy who pulls Excalibur out of the stone in the Dark Ages segment.

== Music ==
The film's music was directed by Steve Tyrell, with an original score by Richard Kosinski, Sam Winans, Bill Reichenbach Jr., Ashley Hall and Bob Mann. The six musical numbers, influenced by popular songs and standards from the 1950s and after, were composed by Ashley Hall and Tyrell, written by Stephanie Tyrell, and recorded at the Tyrell-Mann and Tempo Recording Studios in Los Angeles.

Title	Based on	Performer(s)	Length
"At the Pound"	"At the Hop"	Ashley Hall	2:29
"Now That You're Here"	—N/a	Cathy Cavadini	1:03
"The King of Everything"	"Riot in Cell Block Number 9"	George Rose	1:56
"All in Your Mind"	"Who Do You Love?"	Ashley Hall	3:08
"I'm a Puppy Too"	"Duke of Earl"	Mark Vieha	2:11
"Puppy Power's Back"	"Jailhouse Rock"	Cast	1:43

== Production ==
Pound Puppies and the Legend of Big Paw was produced by Carolco Pictures and Atlantic/Kushner-Locke along with The Maltese Companies, financed by Tonka, the original owners of the Pound Puppies franchise, and distributed by TriStar Pictures. The film's director, Pierre DeCelles, was also an art director and directing storyboard artist.

According to DeCelles, production took five and a half months, starting in the fall of 1987. The first two and a half months were spent on preparing its layouts and storyboards, and the remaining time on the animation, backgrounds and shooting. The overseas work was done by Wang Film Productions and Cuckoo's Nest Studio, two Taiwanese companies known for their contributions to children's animated television series.

The film's animation and character design were different from the Hanna-Barbera series, and did not contribute to the latter's continuity. A new set of characters were introduced for the film: Pound Puppies Collette, Beamer and Reflex, and the Pound Purries Hairball and Charlamange, along with two teenagers, Tammy and Jeff, that replaced the 11-year-old Holly.

== Release ==
During its short theatrical run, The Legend of Big Paw played mainly in matinees and only grossed US$586,938. The film was Carolco's sole family feature, and distributor Tri-Star's only animated feature until The Trumpet of the Swan (2001). It was among the last in a line of 1980s animated productions for the big screen which featured established toy properties as their main characters. Previous examples included films based on the Care Bears, My Little Pony and Transformers.

=== Reception ===
Critical response was negative during its initial run. The Hollywood trade magazine, Variety, called it "uninvolving and endlessly derivative". The Sacramento Bee deemed it "miserably drawn" in comparison to what Disney was offering at the time, and the San Francisco Chronicle gave it an "empty chair" rating. A reviewer in the Detroit Free Press found it "dull and unoriginal", but praised the songs that were written for it.

Martha Baker of the St. Louis Post-Dispatch also denounced it and began her review thus:

If you're in your 40th year and not your fourth, Pound Puppies and the Legend of Big Paw requires the extra dosage of insulin reserved for such treks into celluloid and commercial [sweetness]. But even 4-year-olds have trouble swallowing this cartoon whole.

Writing for The Animated Movie Guide by animation expert Jerry Beck, Stuart Fisher gave one star out of four, and saw the film's artistic quality as "a mixed bag". He continued: "[While] the backgrounds are somewhat imaginative and colorful, the character animation is flat and lifeless. Rapid cuts to new angles of the same shot seem to try to cover up limitations of the animation technique". Moreover, Fisher and The Philadelphia Inquirer took note of its purpose as a toy commercial, a trend that was prevalent in the animation industry during the late 1980s.

=== Home media ===
Family Home Entertainment released Pound Puppies and the Legend of Big Paw on the VHS format on September 14, 1989. Its successor, Lionsgate, released a region 1 DVD on October 24, 2006. Like the Hanna-Barbera TV series before it, the film also enjoyed airplay on the Disney Channel during the early to mid-1990s.

== See also ==
- List of American films of 1988
- Lists of animated films
- Pound Puppies
