= Brennan Howard =

American actor and director

Brennan Howard is an American actor and director. He has written, produced, directed, and starred in at least four films: Dick Richards (1996) featuring Ashley Judd, The Temple of Phenomenal Things (1997), Straighten Up America (2003), an ill-fated T.V. show known as GamePro TV (1991), and the voice of Cooler in 1988's Pound Puppies and the Legend of Big Paw.

His directorial feature debut, Low (2008), premiered at the 10th Annual Method Fest Film Festival. A review from the L.A. Daily News entertainment section (LA.com) cited that "Low is the type of independent film that a film critic prays for: though not a big budget film, it does so much with what it has and does not scrimp on story or acting (the same cannot be said for so many studio films today). This is one of the darkest (and funniest) comedies in a long time. Director Brennan Howard tells the story with quiet confidence and masterful pacing throughout." Howard's production company and acting troupe are Blah Cubed Productions.

His latest series and feature film is "The Hair Whisperer" (2016) (THW) now playing on Vimeo, as well as his other feature films: "The Tao of Pinochet" (2011) and "Amnésique" (2012).
