= Kelle Kerr =

American actress

- Occupations: Film, television, voice actress

Kelle Kerr is an American actress, best known perhaps for her voice-over work. Her list of credits is extensive, including work on commercials, promos, & industrial film. She also works in front of the cameras, having appeared in The Boost, with James Woods and Sean Young, as well as stints on television, such as her appearances on One Life To Live and Law & Order (episodes "Pride" and "By Hooker, By Crook"). Her stage work includes Boxes, with the Innovative Stages company, in Westchester County, New York, and the off-Broadway, WPA theatre, production of The Subject of Childhood. She also posed for the February 1984 issue of Playboy photographed by Palma Kolansky. She appeared in 2009 opposite Joan Copeland, sister of Arthur Miller, and Kim Luce, wife of Art Garfunkel, in the off-Broadway production of Tennessee Williams' " Suddenly Last Summer" as Sister Felicity. Member of the famed Actors Studio.
