= Harry Van Dyke =

American rapper

- Also known as: Harry'O The Vandizzle; Harry Vandyke
- Born: September 29, 1972 (age 53); Detroit, Michigan, U.S.
- Origin: Los Angeles, California, U.S.
- Genres: Rap
- Occupations: Rapper, record producer, minor actor
- Years active: 1986–present
- Label: Lay'em Down Studios (Note: Van Dyke is now an independent artist who owns his own recording studio.)

Harry Van Dyke, also known as Harry'O The Vandizzle (born September 29, 1972) is an American actor and record producer, most known for his role as Douby in the movie Split Decisions. His music credits are the album The Camp from Lay'em Down Productions, and various other songs that he produced.

== Discography ==
=== Albums ===
Year	Album	Title	Notes
2009	The Camp	Various songs	Recorded in all but three songs, also produced

== Filmography ==
Year	Title	Role	Notes
1988	Split Decisions	Douby	minor character
