= Split Decisions =

1988 American film

- Theatrical release poster
- Directed by: David Drury
- Written by: David Fallon
- Produced by: Joe Wizan
- Starring: Craig Sheffer; Jeff Fahey; Jennifer Beals; John McLiam; Gene Hackman
- Cinematography: Timothy Suhrstedt
- Edited by: Thomas Stanford
- Music by: Basil Poledouris
- Distributed by: New Century Entertainment
- Release date: November 11, 1988
- Running time: 92 minutes
- Country: United States
- Language: English
- Budget: $9 million
- Box office: $695,822

Split Decisions is a 1988 American crime drama sports film directed by David Drury and starring Craig Sheffer, Jeff Fahey, Jennifer Beals and Gene Hackman.

== Plot ==
On the east side of New York City, boxing trainer Danny McGuinn is trying to prepare one of his sons, Eddie, to earn a chance to fight in the Olympic Games, while his other son, Ray, has fallen in with shady men from organized crime. After Ray is killed, Eddie discovers that an opposing boxer, Julian Pedroza, was involved in his brother’s death and challenges him to a bout in the hopes of securing revenge. Eddie defeats Pedroza after a hard-fought match, and the film ends with the remaining McGuinns celebrating victoriously.

== Cast ==
- Craig Sheffer as Eddie McGuinn
- Jeff Fahey as Ray McGuinn
- Gene Hackman as Danny McGuinn
- John McLiam as Pop McGuinn
- Jennifer Beals as Barbara Uribe
- Eddie Velez as Julian 'The Snake' Pedroza
- Carmine Caridi as Lou Rubia
- James Tolkan as Benny Pistone
- David Labiosa as Rudy
- Harry Van Dyke as Douby
- Anthony Trujillo as Angel
- Victor Campos as Santiago
- Tom Bower as Detective Walsh
- Julius Harris as Tony Leone
- De'voreaux White as Coop
- Herb Muller as Mr. D.
- Cathleen A. Master as Pedroza's Girlfriend
- Rachel Renick as Red-Haired Woman
- Mark Dirkse as Thug #1
- George Robotham as Thug #2
- Pete Antico as Sparring Partner #1
- Mark Hicks as Sparring Partner #2
- Michael Adams as Sparring Partner #3
- Joe Godsen as Sparring Partner #4
- George P. Wilbur as Referee At Patty Flood

== Reception ==
In a review, TV Guide described Split Decisions as a "tedious low-budget boxing film". While praising Hackman's performance, the review pans the movie's "predictable script and phony, Rocky-style ending".

Writing for the Los Angeles Times, Michael Wilmington spoke more positively about the movie, declaring it a "rousing boxing melodrama that pretty much earns a split decision itself".

The film opened on 405 screens across the United States other than New York, Boston and Philadelphia but grossed a disappointing $423,303 in its opening weekend. It went on to only gross $695,822 in the United States and Canada.

== See also ==
- List of boxing films
