= Pierre DeCelles =

Canadian animator

Pierre DeCelles (born December 14, 1951) is a Canadian animator who is recognized for his contributions to the animation industry. He directed the film Pound Puppies and the Legend of Big Paw in 1988 and served as the supervising director for the animated series Spiral Zone. Additionally, he lent his voice to the character Ren Höek's screaming and cackling in the pilot episode of The Ren & Stimpy Show, which aired in the 1990s. He's also known for his work on Adventures of Sonic the Hedgehog in 1993.

== Early life and career ==
DeCelles was primarily self-taught. Over his 40-year career, he worked in several countries, including Canada, Taiwan, South Korea, the United States, Japan, and China. Pierre worked on numerous animation projects for studios such as Wang's Production, Warner Brothers, Marvel Production, DIC Entertainment, Atlantic/Kushner-Locke Inc., and Hanna-Barbera Productions, among others.

In addition to his animation work, DeCelles is also a draftsman and painter. He is best known for his "Zhong Kui", "Red Riding Hood", "Don Quixote", "U.F.O.", and "Buddha" series of paintings and drawings. In 2004, a prominent exhibition of his "Zhong Kui" paintings was held in Shanghai, China, which was co-hosted by the Canadian consulate general.

== Personal life ==
Currently, Pierre is the co-founder and animation director of his boutique studio, Crashdown Studio, located in Shanghai, China.

== Filmography ==
- 1976 BG Layout and animation director, 'Noah's Animals' (TV Special),'Shamus Culhane' and 'Westfall' prod.

- 1980 Layout and key animation posing, 'The Last of the Red Hot Dragons' (TV Special), ' Shamus Culhane' and Westfall' prod.

- 1984 Animation supervisor (short stay), 'Care Bare, the movie', 'Nelvana' prod.

- 1985 Layout and key animation posing, 'Space Ace' (TV series), first episode.

- 1985 Animator and Animation supervisor 'The Snorks', (TV series),' Snorkitis is nothing to sneeze ',' Hanna-Barbera' prod.

- 1985 BG Layout and animation posing, 'Q-Bert', (TV series),' The Goofy Ghostgetters', 'Ruby-Spear' prod.

- 1986 Character model retake supervisor. (Toho, Japan)'Jem', (TV series) 'The world hunger chingdig', 'Lost Resorts', 'Adventure in China', 'In stitches', 'Marvel' prod.,'Sunbow' prod.

- 1986 Animation supervisor (Akom studio, Korea), 'My Little Pony, the movie', 'Hasbro' and 'Sunbow' prod.

- 1987 Key animation, 'The Chipmunk's Great Adventure', (Feature film), 'Bagdasarian' and 'Shakespeare' prod.

- 1987 Key animation, 'Family Dog', ('Amazing stories', epis.), 'Hyperion, Kushner-Locke prod.

- 1988 Key animation, (Great American Studios),'Kissyfur' (TV series), 'Home Sweet Swamp','D.I.C.' prod.'Slimer' (TV series), 'Not so great outdoors', 'D.I.C.' prod.

- 1988 Director (storyboard, art direction, layout, design, and anim.), 'Pound Puppies and the Legend of Big Paw', (Feature film),'Donald Kushner', 'Peter Locke' prod.

- 1989 Director, (writer, designer, storyboard on pre-production), 'Blue Eyes Superstars', (TV series pilot), 'S.E.P..P.', prod.

- 1989 Layout key animation posing, 'The Book of Mormons', (TV and DVD market), 'The conversation of Alma the younger', 'Living Scriptures' prod.

- 1989 Storyboard artist, 'The Smurfs' (TV series), 'Smurfs that Time Forgot', 'The Monumental Grouch', 'Smurfette's green thumb', 'Hanna-Barbera' prod.

- 1990 Storyboard artist,'Rick Moranis Gravedale High', (TV series), 'Dress up, mess up', 'Cleopatra's Pen Pal', 'Long Day's Gurney into the Night', 'Do the Rad Thing', 'Monsters on trial','Hanna Barbera' prod.

- 1990 Storyboard Artist, 'Tinytoon', (TV series), 'Hero Hampton', 'Warner Bros. Animation' and 'Amblin Entertainment'.

- 1991 Voice sound effects, (Hysteria Screams),'Ren and Stimpy', 'Big House Blues', and other shows, 'Nickelodeon' prod.

- 1991 Pre-Production designs, storyboard, animation (Pilot Film),'Akata, Prince of Atlantis', 'Pixibox' prod.

- 1992 Layout supervisor, (Pacific Rim studio, China),'The Super Trolls',(TV series),'Magneto Two','D.I.C.' prod.

- 1992 Director (Art dir., storyboard, design, story), (Pacific Rim),'The New Adventures of Little Toot', (Feature Film) written by 'Roy Freeman', a 'Penn' prod.

- 1992 Character designs (epi.406-445), layout animation key posing,'Tazmania', (TV series), epi.406-440, epi.406-446, epi.406-447, epi.406-448, epi.406-451.

- 1992 Concept designer, storyboard, animation, director,'The Woozies', 'Nickell and the Booma Looma Bunch', 'Rambuster and the Computinies', (TV series pilot films), 'Media Development', S.A.

- 1993 Layout and Animation Director, (Hong Ying, Taiwan) 'The Adventures of Sonic the Hedgehog' (TV series), 'Big Daddy', 'Snow Problem', 'So Long Sucker', 'Sonic Breakout',' Sonic gets trashed', 'The mystery of the missing Hi-Tops', 'Robotnik JR', 'Mc Hopper','Mad Mike, da bear warrior', 'Attack on the Pinball Fortress', 'The Little Merhog', 'The Robot's Robot', 'Hero of the year', 'Life of the sick and twisted', 'Sonic is running'.

- 1994 Storyboard Artist, 'Problem Child', (TV series), 'Junior in the Big House', Lacewood' prod.

- 1997 Layoutman, animator, director, (Hong Ying, China) 'Tex Avery Theater', (TV series), 'Silence of the Lame', 'D.I.C.'prod.

- 1998 Layout supervisor, (Hong Ying, China), 'Animal Stories', (TV series), 'Caterpillar', 'Cat Fish', 'Centipede','Cheetah', 'Cat', 'Cow', 'Donkey', 'Dinosaure', 'Hippo', 'Humming Bird','Magpie', 'Whale', 'Collingwood' and Ohare entertainment prod.

- 1998 Animator and director, (Hong Ying), 'Courage the Cowardly Dog', 'Promo test for 'Strech Films'

- 1998 Layout supervisor (Hong Ying), 'Urban Birds', (Pilot Episode), 'Neptuno Films' prod.

- 1999 Layout and animation director, (Hong Ying), 'Sabrina, the animated series', (TV series), 'This is your nine lives','Key to my heart', 'Xabrin warrior witch','Enchanted vacation','Salem's Plot','Scare apparent', 'Hex-Change students', 'Once upon a whine','As anyone seen my Quigley ?', 'Witch switch', 'Tail of two kitties','Boogie shoes', 'Brina Baby', 'Lord of the Dance', 'D.I.C.' prod.

- 2001 Layout and animation director, 'The new Adventures of Madeline', (TV series), 'Madeline on Stage', 'D.I.C.' prod.

- 2001 Animation supervisor, 'What about Mimi?' (TV series), 'Into the woods', 'Lights, Camera, Action', 'Studio B' prod.

- 2001 Producer and director, (Hong Ying), 'M-813', (6 min. Promo), 'P. De Celles', 'G. Grammat', prod.

- 2002 Retake supervisor (Hosem, China), 'Altair', (TV series), 52 episodes, 'Hahn Film' prod.

- 2003 Layout location designer, (Hoochi, China) 'Olympic Mathematics', (TV series), 'Far East Animation' Ltd.

- 2006 Layout and animation director, (Bellanim, China)'U', (French, feature Film), 'Prima Linea' prod.

- 2006 Art Designer, co-writer, co-editor, and actor, 'Claustro', (6 minutes live-action), 'Yubi Digital', Shanghai'.

- 2007 Producer and director (Changchun, China),'Workshop 2007', (live-action and animation), 30 minutes Documentary of my students in class, Animation College of Changchun.

- 2008 Ghost animator and consultant, (China), 'The Monkey King', (TV series), first episode, 'CCTV Ani.inc.'.

- 2008 Ghost animator and consultant, (China), 'A tout Cinq', (TV series), 'C'est de ta faute', 'Bout du nez','EuroVisual' prod.

- 2009 Ghost animator and consultant, (China), 'Marsupilami', (TV series), 'Les Belles au bois dormant','Marsu' and 'Sanka' prod.

- 2009 Ghost animator and consultant, (China), 'Poppixie', (TV series),'The green invasion','Rainbow' prod.

- 2009 Free-Lance animator (Shanghai), 'Princess Lilifee', (Feature film), 'Caligari Film' and 'Wunderwerks' prod.

- 2011 Ghost animator and consultant, (China), 'Horrid Henry', (TV series), 'Detention', Trick Company prod.

- 2011 Ghost animator and consultant, (China), 'Chirho', (TV series),'The Secret', Trick Company prod.

- 2011 Ghost animator and consultant, (China), 'Mon Ami Grompf', (TV series),'Un Grompf d'amour', 'Grompf met le chantier', 'Aqua Grompf', 'Australopi Grompf', 'Grompf se rachete une conduite', 'L'Arche de Grompf', 'Une maison de Grompf', 'Jamais sans mon Gromph', 'Grompf en eau trouble', 'Toon Factory'.
