= Jason Downs =

American singer (born 1973)

- Born: Jason Wright Downs; September 8, 1973 (age 52); Columbia, Maryland, United States
- Occupations: Actor, Singer
- Years active: 1988–present
- Website: http://www.jasondowns.com/home.html

Jason Wright Downs (born September 8, 1973, in Columbia, Maryland) is an American actor and singer. He has released two albums on Jive Records, White Boy with a Feather and The Spin. He also released "White Boy with a Feather", "Revenue", "Cherokee", "Trippin'", "Shut Up (Let's Hook Up)", and a cover of Harry Chapin's "Cat's in the Cradle". His single "White Boy with a Feather" debuted at number 19 on the UK Singles Chart. The rap artist Milk Dee has appeared on and produced many of his songs, and the songs without the rapper are more rooted in folk, rock, country or pop music. As a music artist, he appeared in many British radio and variety shows, including Top of the Pops, CD:UK, MTV, a radio2XS Barn Session and The Big Breakfast.

His last, independently released album, Love Me Alone, is produced by Grammy Award winner Malcolm Burn.

As an actor, Downs has appeared in the films Hairspray, Clara's Heart, and Come Lovely, which he also produced. He starred in a feature film titled Racing Daylight alongside David Strathairn, Melissa Leo and Giancarlo Esposito as well as a supporting role in the film Gospel Hill. He wrote and directed his first film, a short, in 2014 titled Growth Spurt. His television credits include K.C. Undercover, NCIS: Los Angeles, NCIS: New Orleans, NCIS: Hawaii, and Days of our Lives. He received critical acclaim for his portrayal of Lenny in Harold Pinter's The Homecoming with the Pacific Resident Theatre Company.
