= Tony Longo =

American actor (1961–2015)

- Longo as Zeke Braxton on Drake & Josh
- Born: August 19, 1961; Jersey City, New Jersey, U.S.
- Died: June 20, 2015 (aged 53); Marina del Rey, California, U.S.
- Occupations: Actor; writer; painter
- Years active: 1977–2015
- Spouse: Jamie Briggs (m. 1992)
- Children: 3

Anthony Longo (August 19, 1961 – June 20, 2015) was an American actor who appeared in seventy films and nearly ninety television shows.

== Early life and education ==
Born in Jersey City, New Jersey, Longo attended Marist High School in Bayonne, New Jersey, and the University of Rhode Island.

== Career ==
Because of his 6 ft 6 in (1.98 m), 300 lb (140 kg) frame, Longo was often chosen for roles that depict him as an imposing giant with freakish strength, and sub-standard intelligence, such as Mad Dog in the 1980s comedy/drama 1st and Ten where he was a linebacker for the fictional football team, the California Bulls. Mad Dog was paired with fellow linebacker Dr. Death, played by actor Donald Gibb who has had a career playing similar roles as Longo. He also appeared in Suburban Commando starring Hulk Hogan as a bounty hunter alongside The Undertaker.

Longo appeared in numerous television series, including The Equalizer, Family Matters, The Facts of Life, The Fresh Prince of Bel-Air, Laverne & Shirley, Simon & Simon, Alice, Perfect Strangers, High Tide, Renegade, Sydney, Las Vegas, Six Feet Under, Drake & Josh, and Monk.

His film credits include Sixteen Candles, Mulholland Drive, Pound Puppies and the Legend of Big Paw, The Last Boy Scout, the 1994 version of Angels in the Outfield, The Cooler, Eraser, Suburban Commando, and The Flintstones in Viva Rock Vegas.

== Death ==
Longo died in his sleep at his home in Marina del Rey, California, on June 21, 2015, at the age of 53 after a long battle with congestive heart failure and kidney issues. He was survived by his daughters Chloe Longo and Danielle Schramm, his stepdaughter Alexis Dejoria, and his wife of 23 years, Jamie Briggs.

== Filmography ==
=== Film ===
- 1981: Tarzan, the Ape Man as Stunts (uncredited)
- 1982: Pink Motel as Mark
- 1983: The Vals as Mike, Fraternity President
- 1984: Splash as Augie
- 1984: Sixteen Candles as 'Rock'
- 1985: Fletch as Detective #1
- 1985: Stitches as Student Jock
- 1987: Winners Take All as 'Bear' Nolan
- 1987: In the Mood as Carlo, Judy's Husband
- 1988: Pound Puppies and the Legend of Big Paw as Big Paw (voice)
- 1988: Illegally Yours as Konrat
- 1988: Feds as Sailor
- 1989: Bloodhounds of Broadway as 'Crunch' Sweeney
- 1989: Let It Ride as Simpson
- 1989: Worth Winning as Terry Childs
- 1989: Think Big as Supervisor
- 1990: Mr. Destiny as Huge Guy
- 1991: The Marrying Man as Sam
- 1991: Suburban Commando as 'Knuckles'
- 1991: The Art of Dying as Victor
- 1991: The Last Boy Scout as Ray 'Big Ray' Walton
- 1992: Unlawful Entry as Angelo 'Big Angelo'
- 1992: Rapid Fire as Brunner Gazzi
- 1993: Prehysteria! as Louis
- 1993: Remote as Louis Marinelli
- 1994: Angels in the Outfield as Triscuitt Messmer
- 1995: Houseguest as Joey Gasperini
- 1996: Eraser as Mike 'Little Mike'
- 1996: Big Packages as Phil
- 1997: Living in Peril as Truck Driver
- 2000: The Flintstones in Viva Rock Vegas as Rocko 'Big Rocko'
- 2001: Road to Redemption as Vincent, The Enforcer
- 2001: Lloyd as Coach
- 2001: Mulholland Drive as Kenny
- 2001: Hard Luck as Bobby
- 2002: Fangs as Louis
- 2002: Serving Sara as Petey
- 2003: The Cooler as Tony
- 2003: How to Lose a Guy in 10 Days as Sensitive Moviegoer
- 2005: Mr. & Mrs. Smith as Big Bad Bathroom Dude (uncredited)
- 2005: Souled Out as Soul Broker
- 2005: Hercules in Hollywood as Pool Hustler
- 2007: Bunny Whipped as Sandro
- 2007: The Fall of Night as 'Atlas'
- 2008: Jake's Corner as Gus
- 2009: Benny Bliss and the Disciples of Greatness as Tony
- 2010: Jelly as Random Guy
- 2010: Pizza with Bullets as Frankie 'Thats Right'
- 2010: Cause We're Family as Uncle Tony
- 2010: Pete Smalls Is Dead as Joey 'Sausa'
- 2010: Sinatra Club as Lenny
- 2010: Changing Hands as Vito
- 2011: From the Head as Customer G
- 2012: Changing Hands Feature as Unknown
- 2015: Intersection as Fighting Barfly (final film role)

=== Television ===
Tony Longo television credits
Year	Title	Role	Notes
1982	CHiPs	Sly	
1982	Laverne & Shirley	Tank Malone	1 episode
1982	Madame's Place	Lou	Episode: "Naked Lou from Malibu"
1982–1984	Alice	Artie	5 episodes
1983–1986	Simon & Simon	Sylvester / Wally Luger / Colonel Debarri / Smith	4 episodes
1984	The Facts of Life	Hacksaw	1 episode
1987	Perfect Strangers	Fat Jack	2 episodes
1988	The Equalizer	Young	Episode: "Regrets Only"
1990	Full House	Tough Prisoner	1 episode
1990	Sydney	Lenny	1 episode
1991	The Fresh Prince of Bel-Air	Otis	1 episode
1993–1996	Renegade	Bugs / Goochie / Danny Carr	3 episodes
1994	A Perry Mason Mystery: The Case of the Grimacing Governor	Will	TV movie
1995	Get Smart	Agent 0 - Factory Worker	1 episode
1995	High Tide	Angelo	1 episode
1997	Family Matters	Butterball	1 episode
1997–1998	Police Academy: The Series	Luke Kackley	26 episodes
1999	The X-Files	Dominic	1 episode
2002	Six Feet Under	Bitsy	1 episode
2004	Drake & Josh	Zeke Braxton	1 episode
2004	That's So Raven	Python	1 episode
2005	Monk	Second Union Official	1 episode
2006	Las Vegas	Dino "Slim"	1 episode
