= The Boost =

1988 drama film by Harold Becker

- Theatrical release poster
- Directed by: Harold Becker
- Written by: Ben Stein; Darryl Ponicsan
- Based on: Ludes: A Ballad of the Drug and the Dream by Ben Stein
- Produced by: Daniel H. Blatt
- Starring: James Woods; Sean Young; John Kapelos; Steven Hill; Kelle Kerr
- Cinematography: Howard Atherton
- Edited by: Maury Winetrobe
- Music by: Stanley Myers
- Distributed by: Hemdale Film Corporation
- Release dates: December 23, 1988 (limited); January 4, 1989 (wide)
- Running time: 95 minutes
- Country: United States
- Language: English
- Box office: $784,990

The Boost is a 1988 American drama film directed by Harold Becker and based on the book Ludes: A Ballad of the Drug and the Dream by Ben Stein. It stars James Woods, Sean Young, John Kapelos, Kelle Kerr, Steven Hill and Amanda Blake.

== Plot ==
Lenny Brown is a real-estate hustler looking to strike it rich. He is married to Linda, a paralegal and amateur dancer. The two struggle financially but are deeply committed to each other. Linda vows to stick with her husband until she "falls off the earth."

After Lenny botches a job interview by being over-zealous, one of the interviewers, Max Sherman, sees Lenny's talent as a salesman and offers to move him and his wife to California where he and Max will sell lucrative investments in tax shelters.

Everything is suddenly first-class for Lenny and his wife and they enjoy a very lavish lifestyle. However tax laws abruptly change and they find themselves $700,000 in debt.

Their circumstances become increasingly desperate, worsened by a friend, Joel Miller, who introduces both to cocaine, as "a boost." Lenny and Linda both become addicted. They lose their home, car and jobs. Linda becomes pregnant, but falls and suffers a miscarriage after using cocaine.

Lenny's life unravels rapidly as cocaine addiction gets the better of him. He gets clean temporarily and conceives one last great business opportunity. However, due to anxiety, his addiction reasserts itself and he irrationally blows the deal in a fit of anger. This culminates in Lenny's severe beating of Linda and putting her in the hospital. She is protected from Lenny while recovering and finally breaks with him permanently. She later falls for the doctor who is treating her.

As the end credits roll, we see Lenny still using cocaine in his filthy apartment. He has been relating his tale to a visiting New York friend, blaming others for his failures, and is reduced to a babbling shell of himself.

== Cast ==
- James Woods as Lenny Brown
- Sean Young as Linda Brown
- John Kapelos as Joel Miller
- Steven Hill as Max Sherman
- Kelle Kerr as Rochelle
- John Rothman as Ned Lewis
- Amanda Blake as Barbara
- Barry Jenner as Billy

== Reception ==
The Boost opened December 23, 1988 on 9 screens in New York, Los Angeles, Chicago, Washington D.C. and Toronto. It received mixed reviews from critics. Roger Ebert gave the film three-and-a-half of a possible four stars, calling the film "one of the most convincing and horrifying portraits of drug addiction I've ever seen." Leonard Maltin was not so kind, however, giving the film only one-and-a-half of a possible four stars: "A misfire that's on the screen for 30 minutes before you even realize that it *is* anti-drug...As with Jack Nicholson in The Shining, it's hard to distinguish the 'before' Lenny from the 'after'."

Woods received an Independent Spirit Award nomination for Best Male Lead.
