= Ashley Hall (musician) =

American singer

- Born: January 3, 1959 (age 67)
- Occupations: Voice actor Composer
- Years active: 1986-1995

Ashley Hall is a musician who did the singing voice of Cooler in 1988's Pound Puppies and the Legend of Big Paw. He also composed the scores for Million Dollar Mystery (1987) and Happily Ever After (1993).
