= Michael Gough (voice actor) =

American voice actor

- Born: San Jose, California, U.S.
- Occupations: Voice actor; musician
- Years active: 1986–present
- Website: www.michaelgough.com/main.html

Michael Gough is an American voice actor. He is known for providing the voices of Deckard Cain in the Diablo series of video games, Gopher in the Winnie the Pooh franchise, the Carmine Brothers in the Gears of War series of video games, many Nords in The Elder Scrolls V: Skyrim (most notably Ralof, Heimskr, and Jarl Balgruuf of Whiterun), Ulrich Vogel in Call of Duty: Black Ops Cold War, Zorro in The New Adventures of Zorro, Captain James "Jim" Gordon in Batman: Arkham Origins, Jambalaya Jake in Darkwing Duck, Colonel Spigot in TaleSpin, Osmund Saddler in Resident Evil 4 (2005), Officer Pete in Doc McStuffins, Parasite in All-Star Superman, Scarecrow in Tom and Jerry and the Wizard of Oz and Shrek in many projects in the franchise where primary voice actor Mike Myers was unavailable. He was also the voice of Pasqually the Chef, along with Mr. Brinca in A Chuck E. Cheese Christmas and Chuck E. Cheese Minisodes.

== Filmography ==
=== Film ===
- All-Star Superman – Parasite
- A Chuck E. Cheese Christmas – Pasqually, Mr. Brinca, Tree Lot Owner
- A Winnie the Pooh Thanksgiving – Gopher
- A Very Merry Pooh Year – Gopher
- Boo to You Too! Winnie the Pooh – Gopher
- Batman: Year One – Driver
- Diablo III: Wrath – Deckard Cain
- Far Far Away Idol – Shrek (singing voice)
- Ghost Cat Anzu – Mr. Tsurumaki
- Lady and the Tramp II: Scamp's Adventure – Joe
- Little Nemo: Adventures in Slumberland – Teacher #2
- Rocket Power: Race Across New Zealand – Chester McGill
- Scooby-Doo! Legend of the Phantosaur – Mr. Babbit, Blair, Grad Student #1, additional voices
- Seasons of Giving – Gopher
- Shattered Spirits – Fred
- The Rumpus Machine – Himself
- The Wizard of Speed and Time – Supporting Cast
- Tom and Jerry and the Wizard of Oz – The Scarecrow, Hunk
- Tom and Jerry: Back to Oz – The Scarecrow, Hunk
- Winnie the Pooh: 123's – Gopher
- Winnie the Pooh: A Valentine for You – Gopher
- Winnie the Pooh: Franken Pooh – Gopher

=== Television ===
- Adventures from the Book of Virtues – Abraham Lincoln (episode: "Honor")
- Aladdin – Kapok's Guard, Musician (episode: "Heads, You Lose")
- Ben 10 – Lt. Steel, SACT Member #2
- Ben & Izzy – Lysippos (Episode: "The Mane Event")
- Bonkers – Additional voices
- Chalkzone – Daddy O'Possum
- Danny Phantom – Sampson (episode: "One of a Kind")
- Darkwing Duck – Jambalaya Jake, Cowboy Doug
- Doc McStuffins – Officer Pete, Gopher
- Duck Dodgers – Captain Glosterman, Professor, Reporter
- Famous 5: On the Case – Kevin Campbell
- Fatherhood – Coach VanderGroverGrover
- Goof Troop – Fester Swollen (5 episodes)
- House of Mouse – Gopher
- I Am Weasel – Admiral Bullets, Carl, additional voices
- Jackie Chan Adventures – Detective Le Foo, Gray Fox (episode: "Origami")
- James Bond Jr. – Spoiler
- Johnny Bravo – Peter the Horse, Grown Man, Old Man (episode: "Johnny Bravo Meets Adam West/Under the Big Flop/Johnny Bravo Meets Donny Osmond")
- Justice League – Professor Henry Moss, Security Guard (episode: "A Knight of Shadows: Part 1")
- Invasion America – Additional voices
- Max Steel – Grimsley (episode: "Extreme")
- Men in Black: The Series – Cosmosis, Henry Dribble, Scrawny (episode: "The Zero to Superhero Syndrome")
- My Life as a Teenage Robot – Bunny, Fatty, Man #2 (episode: "Shell Game")
- Oh Yeah! Cartoons – Max's Boss
- Rocket Power – RoBattle Announcer, Singer, Robinator
- Rocket Power: Race Across New Zealand – Chester McGill
- TaleSpin – Colonel Spigot (8 episodes)
- Teenage Mutant Ninja Turtles – Raphael (in the final season, following Rob Paulsen's departure from the role), Red Alien, Hitech
- The Angry Beavers – Hosan, Master Ng
- The Emperor's New School – Imatcho (episode: "The Bride of Kuzco")
- The Grim Adventures of Billy & Mandy – CIA Agent #6, CIA Agent #7, Sea Critter, Announcer, Guy Golfer, TV Dad, Chef, Painter, Geek, Daisy the Chupacabra
- The Legend of Prince Valiant – Will, Garth, Servant
- The Little Mermaid – Kid Squid (episode: "Stormy")
- The New Adventures of Winnie the Pooh – Gopher
- The New Adventures of Speed Racer – Speed Racer, Foreman
- The New Adventures of Zorro – Zorro/Don Diego de la Vega
- The PJs – Jackie Chan (episode: "The Last Affirmative Action Hero")
- The Wild Thornberrys – Ted, Rwiti Himona, Conal (episodes: "Chew if by Sea", "Hot Air" and "Sir Nigel")
- Time Squad – George Washington, Freud's Patient, Paul Revere's Father, Dr. Livingstone
- Timon & Pumbaa – Additional Voices
- Totally Spies! – Tim Scam
- We Bare Bears – Dr. Bean (episode: "Money Man")
- What's New, Scooby-Doo? – Drill Sergeant Payne, MP #2
- W.I.T.C.H. – Oracle, Althor, Bouncer, R.C., Werewolf

=== Web series ===
- Chuck E. Cheese Minisodes – Pasqually, Mr. Brinca

=== Video games ===
- Aion – Additional voices
- Ape Escape 3 – Monkey Blue (NTSC-U version)
- Ape Escape Academy – Monkey Blue, Pipotron Blue (NTSC-U version)
- Arcanum: Of Steamworks and Magick Obscura – Franklin Payne
- Area 51 – Additional voices
- Assassin's Creed II – Florentine Guardsman, additional voices
- Assassin's Creed: Brotherhood – Additional voices
- Assassin's Creed: Revelations – Additional voices
- Baldur's Gate – Husam, Krestor, Marek
- Baldur's Gate II: Shadows of Amn – Solaufein
- Batman: Arkham City – Doctor, TYGER Guards, Gotham Cop
- Batman: Arkham Origins – GCPD Captain James "Jim" Gordon
- Batman: Arkham Origins Blackgate – GCPD Captain James "Jim" Gordon
- Bee Movie Game – Harry Beeman, Honey Scientist, Male Bee
- Blaster Learning System series
  - Math Blaster Ages 5-7 – Mel
  - Math Blaster Ages 6-8 – Mel
  - Math Blaster Ages 7-9 – Mel
  - Reading Blaster Ages 4-6 – Mel
  - Reading Blaster Ages 5-7 – Mel
  - Reading Blaster Ages 6-8 – Mel
- Call of Duty series
  - Call of Duty – Captain Price
  - Call of Duty 2 – Captain Price
  - Call of Duty: Black Ops Cold War – Ulrich Vogel
- Champions: Return to Arms – Additional voices
- Crash Bandicoot: On the Run! – Gnasty Gnorc
- Crash Team Racing Nitro-Fueled – N. Trance, Gnasty Gnorc, additional voices
- Diablo series
  - Diablo – Deckard Cain, Sorcerer
  - Diablo II – Deckard Cain
  - Diablo II: Lord of Destruction – Deckard Cain
  - Diablo III – Deckard Cain
  - Diablo III: Reaper of Souls – Deckard Cain
- Disney's Villains' Revenge – Prince Charming, Playing Cards
- Disney Infinity 3.0 - Time
- Doom 3 – E. Grafton, additional voices
- Dragon Age: Origins – Wise Elf, Male, additional voices
- DreamWorks All-Star Kart Racing - Shrek
- Duckman: The Graphic Adventures of a Private Dick – Eric T. Duckman
- Eternal Sonata – Doctor, Royal Official, Magic Researcher (as Well Hoyle)
- EverQuest II – Thardrin Steeleye, Lt. Laughlin, Dword Soulforge, Dibble Rootweaver, Generic Racial Dark Elf, Generic Racial Troll, Generic Racial Ogre, Generic Racial Human, Generic Racial Kerra, Generic Racial Barbarian, Generic Racial Half Elf, Generic Racial Erudite, Generic Racial Gnome, Generic Racial Iksar, Generic Racial Ratonga
- Fallout 76: Wastelanders – Kieran Kennedy, Reginald "Regs" Stone, James Duncan
- Fallout Tactics: Brotherhood of Steel – Additional Voices
- Final Fantasy XIII – Cocoon Inhabitants
- Final Fantasy XIV – Various voices
- Freddy Pharkas: Frontier Pharmacist – Kenny the Kid, Salvatore O'Hanrahan
- Gears of War series
  - Gears of War – Anthony Carmine
  - Gears of War 2 – Benjamin Carmine
  - Gears of War 3 – Clayton Carmine
  - Gears of War: Judgment – Clayton Carmine
  - Gears of War: Ultimate Edition – Anthony Carmine (Benjamin Carmine and Clayton Carmine - part of set)
  - Gears of War 4
  - Gears 5 – Clayton Carmine
  - Gears of War: E-Day – Zee Carmine
- G-Force – Speckles
- Gothic 3 – Additional voices
- Gurumin: A Monstrous Adventure – Hyperbolic, Giga
- Herc's Adventures – Hercules, Dionysus
- Heroes of the Storm – Deckard Cain, Tassadar, Mal'Ganis
- Judgment – Yoji Shono
- JumpStart series
  - JumpStart Adventures 3rd Grade: Mystery Mountain – Dog
  - JumpStart Typing – Male Voiceover, Coach Qwerty
  - JumpStart Wildlife Safari: Field Trip – Frankie
- Killer7 – Dan Smith
- Kingdom Hearts series
  - Kingdom Hearts II – Gopher
  - Kingdom Hearts II: Final Mix+ – Gopher
  - Kingdom Hearts III – Gopher
- Kingdoms of Amalur: Reckoning – Arthagall, Captain Pedwyn, Edgar Aron, additional voices
- King's Quest – Larry, Wente Fey
- Lego Jurassic World – Additional voices
- Leisure Suit Larry: Love for Sail! – Jacques, Willy, Xqwzts
- Lightning Returns: Final Fantasy XIII – Additional voices
- Lost Odyssey – Narrator
- Lost Planet 2 – Additional voices
- Madagascar Kartz – Shrek
- Mafia: Definitive Edition – Finn Harrington, Police
- Marvel: Ultimate Alliance – MODOK, Shocker, Piledriver
- Men of Valor – Schiffer, Aussie #2, Pilot #1, White Marine #1
- Metal Gear series
  - Metal Gear Solid 2: Sons of Liberty – Russian Soldier
  - Metal Gear Solid 3: Snake Eater – Johnny, Soldiers
  - Metal Gear Solid 4: Guns of the Patriots – Narrator, Werewolf
- Middle-earth: Shadow of Mordor – Nemesis Orcs
- Murdered: Soul Suspect – Additional voices
- Open Season – McSquizzy
- Over the Hedge – Rufus, Theme Park Owner, Tiger
- Piglet's Big Game – Gopher
- Predator: Concrete Jungle – Additional voices
- Project Snowblind – PFC John Walker
- Resident Evil 4 – Osmund Saddler
- Rise of the Argonauts – Hermes, Demelion, Centaur
- Robots – Fender
- Samurai Western – Gunman #1, Gunman #5, Group Leader #2
- Saints Row: The Third – Pedestrian and Character Voices
- Shadow of Rome – Narclastese, additional voices
- Shark Tale – Paparazzo Fish, additional voices
- Shannara - Shifter, Herbalist, Tyrsis Guard, Panamon Creel
- Shrek series
  - Shrek – Shrek
  - Shrek 2 – Shrek, King Harold, Knight, Peasant, Mongo, Goat
  - Shrek the Third – Shrek, Announcer
  - Shrek Forever After – Shrek
  - Shrek Smash n' Crash Racing – Shrek, FFPD
  - Shrek's Carnival Craze – Shrek, Puppet Singers, Cyclops, Merry Men
  - Shrek Super Slam - Shrek, Big Bad Wolf
  - Shrek: Totally Tangled Tales- Shrek
  - Shrek: Ogres and Dronkeys - Shrek
  - Shrek n' Roll - Shrek
- Sly Cooper: Thieves in Time – Crane Guard
- Soldier of Fortune II: Double Helix – Additional voices
- Spider-Man 3 – Additional voices
- Spyro: A Hero's Tail – Gnasty Gnorc, The Professor, Sgt. Byrd
- Spyro the Dragon – Gnasty Gnorc, various characters
- Spyro Reignited Trilogy – Gnasty Gnorc
- StarCraft – Tassadar
- Soviet Strike – Bessus
- Star Trek: Deep Space Nine: The Fallen – Chief Miles O' Brien, Obsidian Order Male, Bajoran Monk
- Star Trek: Klingon Academy – Civil War Engineer, Battlestation Commander
- Star Wars: Galactic Battlegrounds – Airspeeder Pilot, Battle Droid, Rebel Hovercraft Captain, Sith Knight, Fast Bike Driver, Zalor Minister
- Star Wars: Knights of the Old Republic – Largo, Hendar
- Star Wars Knights of the Old Republic II: The Sith Lords – Berun Modrul, Bralor, additional voices
- Summoner 2 – Medevan Knight
- Superman Returns – The Citizens of Metropolis
- Super Star Kartz - Shrek
- Tak: The Great Juju Challenge – JuJu Challenge Host
- The Bard's Tale – Additional voices
- The Elder Scrolls V: Skyrim – Acolyte Jenssen, Alvor, Arnskar Ember-Master, Balgruuf the Greater, Barknar, Beirand, Belrand, Bersi Honey-Hand, Bolund, Brunwulf Free-Winter, Calder, Falk Firebeard, Filnjar, Fultheim the Fearless, Golldir, Gorm, Hadring, Hafnar Ice-Fist, Heimskr, Hjorunn, Hod, Hunroor, Jon Battle-Born, Jorn, Kjar, Kjeld, Korir, Kraldar, Kust, Kyr, Lodvar, Lortheim, Nords (Male), Odar, Oengul War-Anvil, Ogmund, Pactur, Phantom, Ralis Sedarys, Ralof, Rissing, Roggi Knot-Beard, Roggvir, Skaggi Scar-Face, Skulvar Sable-Hilt, Sond, Svaknir, Talsgar the Wanderer, Thalmor Prisoner, Thjollod, Thongvor Silver-Blood, Thonnir, Thorek, Thorgar, Torkild the Fearsome, Ulfgar the Unending, Vekel the Man, Viding, Vilkas, Vilod, Vipir the Fleet, Vulwulf Snow-Shod, Wilhelm
- The Elder Scrolls Online – Shalidor
- The Golden Compass – Lord Faa, Gyptian Hunter, Injured Sailor
- The Last of Us – Additional voices
- The Lord of the Rings: The Battle for Middle-earth II: The Rise of the Witch-king – Black Numenoreans
- The Matrix: Path of Neo – Seraph, Agent Brown, Vamp
- The Mummy Returns – Ardeth
- The Punisher – Martin Soap
- The Saboteur – Additional voices
- Titanic Explorer – Jack Thayer, Francis Dyke, Frank Prentice, Arthur Lewis, James Paintin
- Tonka series
  - Tonka Construction – Tonka Joe
  - Tonka Construction 2 – Tonka Joe
  - Tonka Search & Rescue – Tonka Joe
  - Tonka Rescue Patrol – Tonka Joe
  - Tonka Garage – Tonka Joe
  - Tonka Workshop – Tonka Joe
  - Tonka Raceway – Tonka Joe
  - Tonka Digs N Rigs – Tonka Joe
  - Tonka Space Station – Tonka Joe
  - Tonka Power Tools – Tonka Joe
- Too Human – Aesir Officer, Beserker, Human Aide, Heimdall
- Travis Strikes Again: No More Heroes – Electro Triple Star, Dan Smith, News Caster
- Treasure Planet: Battle at Procyon – Canid Captain, Canid Crew, Commander
- True Crime: Streets of LA – Additional voices
- Uncharted 2: Among Thieves – Serbian Soldiers
- Uncharted 3: Drake's Deception – Serbian Soldier
- Uncharted 4: A Thief's End – Shoreline Mercenary
- Vampire: The Masquerade – Bloodlines – Beckett, Stanley Gimble
- Viewtiful Joe 2 – Big John
- Viewtiful Joe: Red Hot Rumble – Big John
- Winnie the Pooh's Rumbly Tumbly Adventure – Gopher
- Xenosaga Episode II: Jenseits von Gut und Böse – Jin Uzuki, Vector Staff
- Xenosaga Episode III: Also sprach Zarathustra – Jin Uzuki, Aizen Magus
- X-Men Legends – Soldier #3, various voices
