= Pound Puppies (disambiguation) =

Pound Puppies is a toyline.

Pound Puppies may also refer to:

- Pound Puppies (film), a 1985 television special
- Pound Puppies (1986 TV series), an animated TV series that ran from 1986–1987
- Pound Puppies and the Legend of Big Paw, a 1988 animated film based on the animated TV series
- Pound Puppies (2010 TV series), an animated TV series that ran from 2010–2013

== See also ==
- List of Pound Puppies characters
