= Tonka =

American producer of toy trucks

- Formerly: Mound Metalcraft Co. (1946–1955); Tonka Toys Inc. (1955–1965); Tonka Corporation (1965–1994)
- Type: Brand
- Traded as: NYSE: TKA
- Industry: Entertainment
- Founded: June 22, 1946; 80 years ago in Mound, Minnesota, U.S.
- Founder: Lynn Everett Baker, Avery F. Crounse, Alvin F. Tesch
- Defunct: 1991; 35 years ago (as a company)
- Fate: Acquired by Hasbro in 1991, currently exists as a brand
- Key people: Russell L. Wenkstern
- Products: Model trucks, action figures, video games
- Brands: GoBots; Rock Lords; Supernaturals; Spiral Zone
- Owner: Hasbro (1991–present)
- Subsidiaries: Mell Manufacturing Co. (1964); Kenner Parker (1987); Palitoy (1987)
- Website: basicfun.com/tonka

Tonka is an American brand and former manufacturer of toy trucks. The company was founded in 1946 and operated as an independent manufacturer of popular steel toy construction-type trucks and machinery, until its sale to Hasbro in 1991.

== History ==
Tonka began as "Mound Metalcraft", a gardening tools company, in 1946 in Mound, Minnesota. Lynn Everett Baker (1898–1964), Avery F. Crounse, and Alvin F. Tesch created the company in an old schoolhouse. Their building's former occupant, the Streater Company, had made and patented several toys, including toy trucks. E. C. Streater was not interested in the toy business so they approached Mound Metalcraft. The three men at Mound Metalcraft thought they might make a good sideline to their other products.

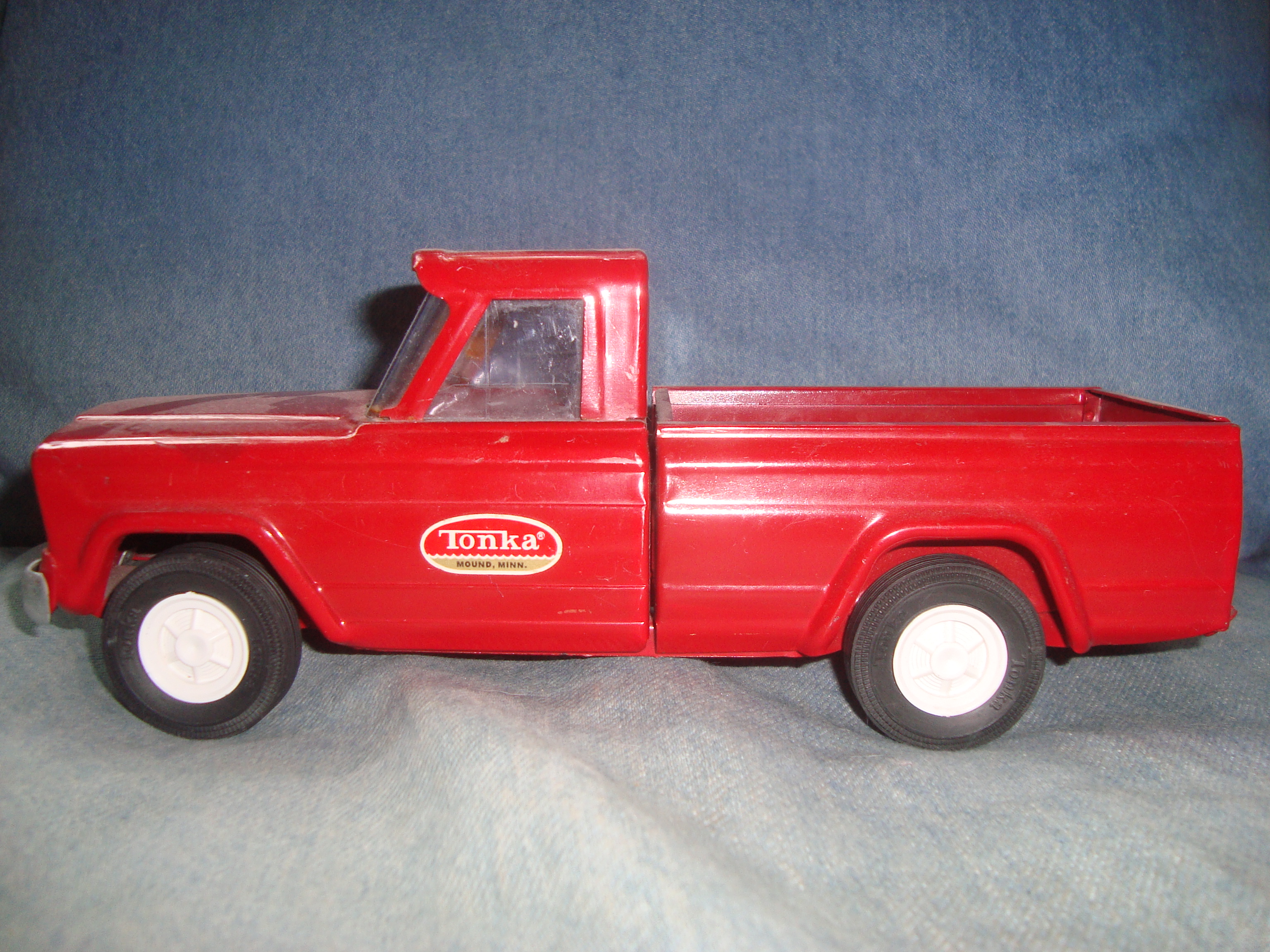
1960s Tonka truck

After some modifications to the design by Alvin Tesch and the addition of a new logo created by Erling Eklof, the company began selling metal toys, which soon became the primary business. The logo was based on a University of Minnesota drafting student's sketch by Donald B. Olson, who later became the company's Chief Industrial Engineer. The logo used the Dakota Sioux word tanka, which means "great" or "big".

In November 1955, Mound Metalcraft changed its name to "Tonka Toys Incorporated". From 1947 to 1957, their logo was an oval, showing the Tonka Toys name in red above blue ocean waves with seagulls overhead, honoring nearby Lake Minnetonka.

From 1958 to 1961, the logo no longer included seagulls and the colors were changed to white, grey, and red. The colors changed to red and gold in 1963. In 1978, the oval was removed and the company began using only the name Tonka on their toys.

In 1964, Tonka acquired the Mell Manufacturing Company in Chicago, Illinois, allowing it to produce barbecue grills, eventually under the Tonka Firebowl label.

In 1968, Tonka moved company headquarters from Mound to Minneapolis.

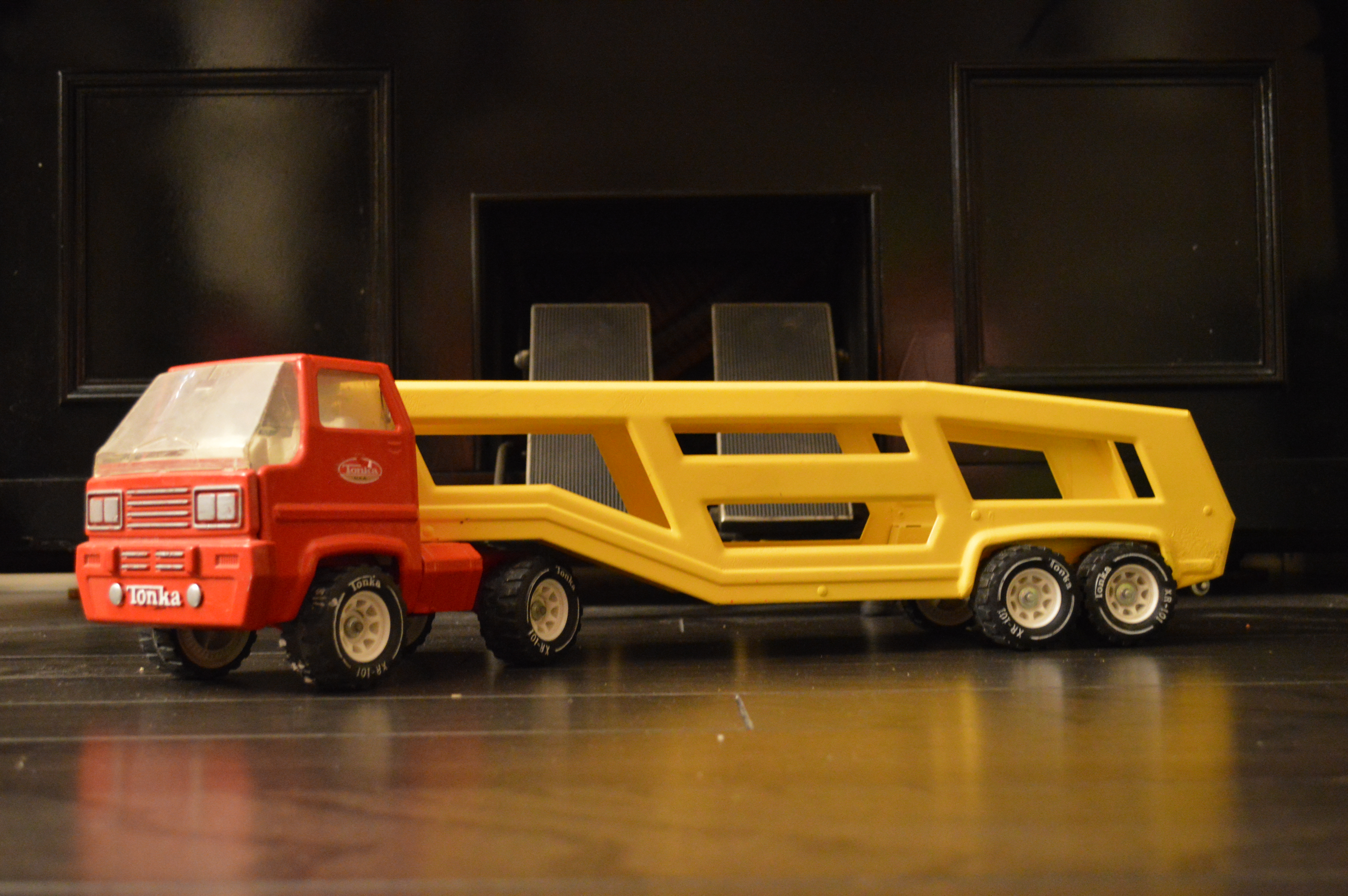
Late 1970s Tonka Car Carrier

In 1987, Tonka purchased Kenner Parker, including UK toy giant Palitoy, for $555 million, borrowing extensively to fund the acquisition. However, the cost of servicing the debt meant Tonka itself had to find a buyer and it was eventually acquired by Hasbro in 1991, its headquarters moved out of Minnesota, and relocated its manufacturing operations to Hasbro's facilities in Pawtucket, Rhode Island. In 1998, Hasbro began a licensing deal with Funrise Toys to manufacture and distribute Tonka trucks. The deal began with versions of the trucks fitted with electronics for lights and sounds, but grew to encompass the entire brand. This agreement ended on July 4, 2019, with the license being transferred to Basic Fun!, which produces other brands such as Care Bears, My Little Pony, and Lincoln Logs. Maisto International acquired the rights to use the Tonka name in a line of 1:64 scale die-cast vehicles featuring mostly trucks.

In 2024, Basic Fun filed for Chapter 11 bankruptcy protection. The company will use bankruptcy proceedings to repay its creditors while remaining in operation.

== Products ==
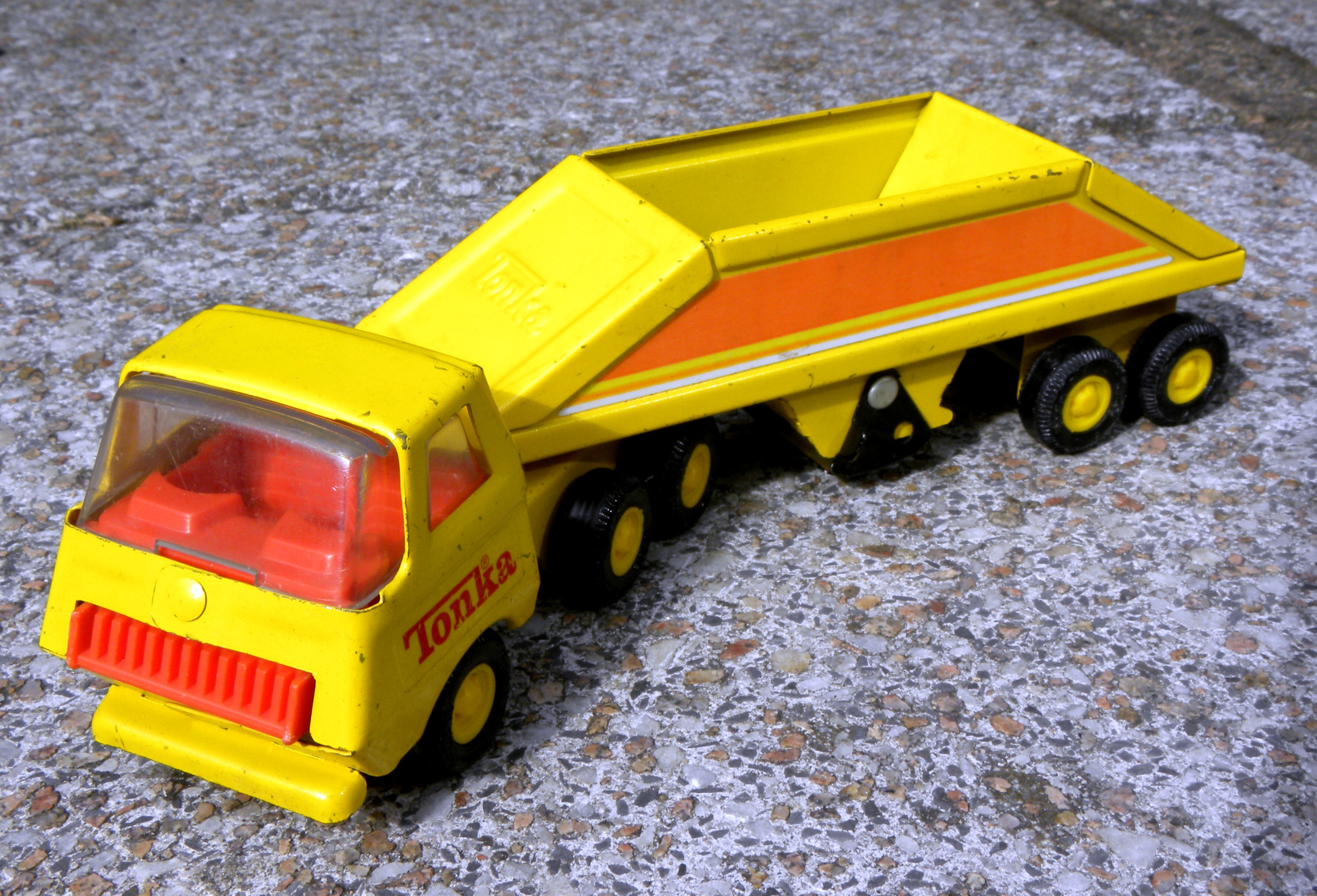
1978 model Tonka bottom dump truck

Tonka has produced a variety of toys, including dolls (Star Fairies, Bathing Beauties, Maple Town, and Hollywoods). They have produced other toys, some aimed at girls (such as Keypers), and others aimed at boys (such as Gobots, Supernaturals, Rock Lords, Spiral Zone, Legions of Power and Steel Monsters). It was the original manufacturer of the Pound Puppies toy line, and in the late 1980s licensed products inspired by Maple Town.

Tonka produced video games as Tonka Video Games, including Tonka Raceway, and purchased the rights to distribute and market the Master System after Sega of America stopped competing against the Nintendo Entertainment System in the US. However, the Master System's market share declined, since Tonka did not have experience with video games or how to market them. Hasbro sold the digital gaming rights for various properties (including My Little Pony, Magic: The Gathering, Tonka, Playskool, and Transformers) to Infogrames (later known and currently operating as Atari SA) for US$100 million in 2000, buying back the rights for US$65 million in June 2005.

In 2001, Tonka trucks were inducted into the National Toy Hall of Fame at The Strong in Rochester, New York. The Winifred Museum in Winifred, Montana, has a collection of more than 3,000 Tonka toys. In 2002, Ford made its very first partnership with Tonka with the Mighty F-350 concept.

== In other media ==
=== Computer and video games ===
Fourteen video games based on the toys were released between 1996 and 2006. A majority of these titles were released by Hasbro Interactive and its later re-brandings as Infogrames Interactive and Atari Interactive, although a small number of titles for Nintendo platforms were released by TDK Mediactive under a sub-licensing agreement from Infogrames.

Game title	Release date	Platforms	Developer	Publisher
Tonka Construction	February 1996	Microsoft Windows	Vortex Media Arts	Hasbro Interactive
Tonka Search & Rescue	October 1997	Microsoft Windows	Media Station	Hasbro Interactive
Tonka Garage	April 7, 1998	Microsoft Windows	Media Station	Hasbro Interactive
Tonka Construction 2	October 2, 1999	Microsoft Windows	ImaginEngine; Magellan Interactive	Hasbro Interactive
Tonka Raceway	December 6, 1999	Microsoft Windows; Game Boy Color	Media Station	Hasbro Interactive
Tonka Workshop	July 31, 2000	Microsoft Windows	Media Station	Hasbro Interactive
Tonka Digs N Rigs	September 2000	Microsoft Windows	ImageBuilder Software	Hasbro Interactive
Tonka Space Station	November 6, 2000	Microsoft Windows; PlayStation	Data Design Interactive	Hasbro Interactive
Tonka Monster Trucks	September 25, 2001	Microsoft Windows	Data Design Interactive	Infogrames Interactive
Tonka Search & Rescue 2	November 15, 2002	Microsoft Windows	Artech Studios	Infogrames Interactive
Tonka Construction Site	May 30, 2002	Game Boy Color	Cosmigo	TDK Mediactive (Note: Under license from Infogrames Interactive)
Tonka Town	Late 2003	Microsoft Windows	ImaginEngine	Atari Interactive
Tonka: Rescue Patrol	November 18, 2003	GameCube	Lucky Chicken Games	TDK Mediactive (Note: Under license from Atari Interactive)
Tonka Firefighter	February 27, 2004	Microsoft Windows	Boston Animation, Inc.	Atari Interactive
Tonka: On the Job	November 15, 2006	Microsoft Windows; Game Boy Advance	Webfoot Technologies	THQ

=== Other games ===
- Tonka Workshop Playset

=== Filmography ===
==== TV series ====
Title	Premiere date	End date	Network	Note
Challenge of the GoBots	September 8, 1984	1985	First-run syndication	co-production with Hanna-Barbera Productions
Pound Puppies	September 13, 1986	December 19, 1987	ABC	co-production with Hanna-Barbera Productions

==== TV movies and specials ====
Title	Premiere date	Network	Co-production with
Star Fairies	October 26, 1985	Syndication	Hanna-Barbera Productions
Pound Puppies	October 26, 1985	ABC	Hanna-Barbera Productions

==== Films ====
#	Title	Release date	Co-production with
1	GoBots: Battle of the Rock Lords	March 21, 1986	Hanna-Barbera Productions and Clubhouse Pictures
2	Pound Puppies and the Legend of Big Paw	March 18, 1988	Tristar Pictures, Carolco Pictures, Atlantic/Kushner-Locke, The Maltese Companies, Cuckoo's Nest Studio, and Wang Film Productions
3	Tonka Tough Truck Adventures: The Biggest Show on Wheels! (Direct-to-Video; CGI)	September 28, 2004	Hasbro Studios, SD Entertainment, and Paramount Home Entertainment

In 2012, an animated film based on the trucks toy line was in development. It was to be produced by Sony Pictures Animation, Hasbro Studios, and Happy Madison Productions, and to be distributed by Columbia Pictures. A script was written by Happy Madison alumnus Fred Wolf, and was to be produced by Adam Sandler and Jack Giarraputo, Brian Goldner (CEO and president of Hasbro) and Bennett Schneir (Hasbro's senior vice president and managing director of motion pictures).
