= List of Pound Puppies characters =

The main characters from the 1986 TV series. From left to right: Howler, Bright Eyes, Cooler, Whopper, and Nose Marie.

This is a list of Pound Puppies characters from the television series that ran from 1986 to 1989, the TV film, and Pound Puppies and the Legend of Big Paw. The animated children's show was based on the popular 1980's stuffed toyline.

== Characters ==
=== Pound Puppies ===
- Cooler is a Beagle/Bloodhound mix and the leader of the Pound Puppies. As his name would imply, Cooler has an outgoing and mellow personality and always keeps his head up even in the most daring situations. He also has a witty and sharp sense of humor compared to the other characters in the series, which is also backed up by his goofy Eddie Murphy-styled laugh. Cooler is voiced by Dan Gilvezan in the TV series and the TV special. In Pound Puppies and the Legend of Big Paw, Cooler is voiced by Brennan Howard and his singing voice is provided by Ashley Hall.
- Nose Marie is a Boxer/Bloodhound mix and the oldest female of the team. In the first series, she is flirtatious, has good manners, is a bit boastful at times, and is shown to have romantic interests in Cooler. In the second series, she is kind, mature, and has a motherly role over the younger Pound Puppies. She is voiced by Ruth Buzzi in the TV series and in Pound Puppies and the Legend of Big Paw. Nose Marie is voiced by Joanne Worley in the TV special.
- Howler is a Pug/Dalmatian mix and inventor. His trademark red derby comes with a mechanical hand that helps him invent or read a book when he has his hands full. As his name implies, he often howls while speaking or at the end of an episode. In season 1, Howler often stutters in his sentences, which is backed up by his howling. In season 2, Howler is generally not the spotlight puppy and has appeared in fewer episodes than he did in Season 1. Howler is voiced by Robert Morse. He is originally voiced by Frank Welker in the Pound Puppies TV special and only howls. In Pound Puppies and the Legend of Big Paw, Howler is voiced by Hal Rayle and his howling vocal effects are provided by Frank Welker.
- Bright Eyes is a Labrador Retriever named for her bright blue eyes. She is sweet, passionate, and extremely energetic. A hobby of hers is cheerleading, which is seen as one of her roles in the show. At times, she comes across as rather naive and ditzy, but is always aware of what is going on in a situation. She is voiced by Nancy Cartwright impersonating Mae Questel in the TV series and in Pound Puppies and the Legend of Big Paw. Bright Eyes is originally voiced by Adrienne Alexander in the Pound Puppies TV special.
- Whopper is a Jack Russell Terrier and the youngest of the Pound Puppies. He is often fantasizing and imagining nearly impossible situations, and telling little white lies. He wears a diaper even though he is officially a "kid". Whopper also has a brother-sister relationship with Bright Eyes, as they often share opinions, come to agreements, and experience things together. He also dresses up in many different outfits as alter-egos during a heroic or otherwise serious situation, and provides comic relief. His most notable outfit and alter-ego is Wonder Whopper, in which Whopper wears a red cape and a blue bodysuit inspired by Superman. Whopper is voiced by B. J. Ward in both the TV series and Pound Puppies and the Legend of Big Paw.
- Beamer is a Scottish Terrier/Schnauzer mix who is happy-go-lucky and behaves in a cheerful gentleman-like manner. Beamer likes to eat scones, crumpets, cookies and sandwiches. He is able to talk in other languages and accents besides his decidedly Scottish accent, like French, Spanish, and Welsh. Beamer can also be fussy, clean and will not tolerate anything dirty. Beamer appears in Pound Puppies and the Legend of Big Paw, voiced by Greg Berg.
- Barkerville is an upper-class, snobbish English Bulldog. Sometimes, he can be stubborn, smug and naughty, but is kind at heart. He behaves like a gentleman toward women, especially Violet. He is voiced by Alan Oppenheimer in the TV special and by Robert Morse in Wagga Wagga.
- Reflex is a Schnoodle/Old English Sheepdog mix who loves kissing all of his friends, which is followed by his catchphrase "I love you!" every time he hears a bell ring. His tactic can be used whenever needed, but most of the time, instead of doing it for mischief he uses it to make his friends happy whenever they feel sad. It also turns the other Pound Puppies back to normal when they are brainwashed by Marvin McNasty's Mean Machine. Reflex appears in Pound Puppies and the Legend of Big Paw, voiced by Hal Rayle.
- Violet Vanderfeller is a Greyhound/Shar Pei mix who belongs to a rich family and held for ransom by Flack and Tubbs, but she is able to escape from her kidnappers and lands in the City Pound. At the end of the Pound Puppies TV special, she is happily reunited with her owners. Violet is voiced by Gail Matthius.
- Louie is a Cane Corso/Chinook mix who served food to Violet and Cooler. He speaks with a French accent. Louie appears in the Pound Puppies TV special, voiced by Don Messick.
- Scrounger is a Beagle/Shar Pei mix who has a habit of finding junk and trinkets. In the Season 1 episode "Wagga Wagga", he makes a brief cameo appearance with Violet and Barkerville in Cooler's flashback. Scrounger is featured in the episode "Garbage Night: The Musical", where the Pound Puppies convince him to stop eating garbage. He is later adopted by Melissa. Scrounger is voiced by Ron Palillo in the TV special and by Frank Welker and Gregg Berger in the TV series.

=== Other dogs ===
- Uncle J.R. (voiced by John Stephenson) is Whopper's uncle, who is seen once in the episode "Whopper Cries Uncle". Whopper and the Pound Puppies once try to trick him into thinking Whopper is rich to impress him, but in the end, it turns out that J.R. is not rich either. He later gets adopted by a Texas family.
- Biff Barker (voiced by Brian Cummings) is a Basset Hound who stars in a TV series about ghost-catching. Biff is cowardly outside the show, but overcomes his fears to save the Pound Puppies from being harvested for their fur.
- Zazu, the Fairy Dogmother (voiced by Joan Gardner) is a scatterbrained fairy dog who appears in "The Fairy Dogmother". Every time she tries to grant a wish to help the Pound Puppies, her wishes backfire. Zazu eventually masters her magic and helps the Pound Puppies and Holly at the Prom.
- Teensy (voiced by Lorenzo Music) is a tiny puppy whom Nose Marie rescues from Catgut.
- Toots (voiced by Dana Hill) is the leader of the Crushers, a tough gang of dogs. She cons Bright Eyes into stealing wienies and squeaky toys for her gang. When Bright Eyes is being chased by Katrina, Toots and her gang come to the rescue, along with the Pound Puppies. Toots is later adopted by Mrs. Vanderspiff and goes straight.
- Sparky (voiced by Gabriel Damon) is a Golden Retriever puppy who is more like a fire dog than a retriever, much to Whopper's chagrin. He is then adopted by the Fire Department after saving Whopper and Holly from a fire.
- Lucy (voiced by Patricia Parris) is a Samoyed who develops a craving for ice cream while pregnant. At the end of "Where Puppies Come From", she gives birth to three puppies, Candy, Mandy, and Andy. She, Rusty and their three children are later adopted in "Pups on the Loose".
- Rusty (voiced by Philip Proctor) is a Plott Hound who is the partner of Lucy. He, Lucy, and their children are adopted in "Pups on the Loose".
- Candy, Mandy, and Andy (respectively voiced by Russi Taylor, Thy Lee, and Benji Gregory) are the children of Lucy and Rusty, who constantly bicker over everything. The three's bickering get the better of them after they are nearly captured by Katrina. When they hear that they have to be with an individual owner, they promise to work together and not argue again.
- No-Name (voiced by Rob Paulsen) is a dog who is stubborn and does not want to be adopted. After seeing Cooler's unselfish deeds, No-Name reconsiders his stance, allowing himself to be adopted by a girl named Carolyn and named King.
- Princefeld (voiced by Jim Cummings) is one of Toots' partners in crime. Along with Toots, he and his comrades are adopted by Mrs. Vanderspiff and go straight.
- Shauna (voiced by Linda Gary) is a Shar Pei who appears in "Snowbound Pound". While pregnant, she is separated from her owners, the Simons, during a severe snowstorm, but the Pound Puppies and Holly manage to rescue her. Later, with the help of Dr. Weston, Holly, and the Pound Puppies, Shauna gives birth to nine puppies and is reunited with her owners.
- Penelope (voiced by Linda Gary) is Cooler's former girlfriend. Penelope is separated from Cooler during the Wagga-Wagga incident. She now has a husband named Danny and children. While Penelope and her family go on a rescue mission, Danny and the children are captured by Captain Slaughter. With the help of the Pound Puppies, she rescues Danny and her children and are adopted at the end of "Wagga Wagga".
- Pupnick (voiced by Pat Fraley) is Shiba Inu from Mongrowlia, a fictional country similar to Russia. He has feelings for Bright Eyes during his time with Cooler and the gang while being pursued by Clawfinger's henchmen for his collar, which contains a brain crystal. He helps the Pound Puppies save Bright Eyes and defeat Clawfinger in "Secret Agent Pup". He is later adopted.
- Casey (voiced by Danny Cooksey) is a puppy who is separated from his master, Jonathon, during their camping trip. With help from the Pound Puppies, he is able to reunite with Jonathon and his family.
- Beezer (voiced by Allyce Beasley) is a puppy who, at the beginning of The Wonderful World of Whopper, is "so bored I could scream" and she does, but Whopper is able to get Beezer out of boredom and Beezer uses her imagination to have fun. She is later adopted and with her owner, Davie, they have a wonderful imagination via The Wizard of Oz.
- Itchy and Snichey (respectively voiced by Don Messick and Frank Welker) are Nabbit's Dobermann guard dogs who appear in the Pound Puppies TV special.
- Big Paw (voiced by Tony Longo; growing vocal effects provided by Frank Welker; singing voice provided by Mark Vieha) is a large Newfoundland/Pug/Old English Sheepdog mix who is the guardian of the Bone of Scone. Big Paw is a friendly dog, but is lonely and has no friends. When the Pound Puppies tell him that he is not really ugly, Big Paw becomes a good friend and an ally. At the end of Pound Puppies and the Legend of Big Paw, he is adopted by the museum to keep the Bone of Scone from falling into the wrong hands.
- Collette (voiced by Cathy Cavadini) is a young Saint-Usuge Spaniel who is kidnapped by Bones and Lumpy and made into a guard dog by Marvin McNasty's Mean Machine. Toward the end of the film, Collette returns to normal after one of her puppies professes their love to her.
- Florence (voiced by Susan Silo) is a Golden Retriever nursing dog who attends to the birth of Collette's children. She is named for nurse Florence Nightingale.
- Schap (voiced by Frank Welker) is a Saint Bernard who serves as a hospital helper to the Pound Puppies when Cheep-Cheep, a bird rescued by Bright Eyes, gets injured.
- Freddie (voiced by Phillip Glasser) is a young Shar Pei who gets loose and is chased by Katrina. He is later adopted by a girl named Lisa.
- Thunderhawk (voiced by Vaughn Tyree Jelks) is a Siberian Husky puppy who prefers the cold better than the heat. He participates in the Dog Sled Race at Alaska. When the Pound Puppies are in danger, he gives up the race in order to save them. Though he loses the race, Nahook, his owner, still adopts him because of his bravery.
- Spats is an Australian Shepherd whom Cooler and King meet at the dog pound. When she is in cage one, Cooler is able to save Spats by telling a young boy to adopt her. She is last seen with her new owner in "Cooler, Come Back".
- Canine Cafe Trio (voiced by René Auberjonois, Thy Lee, and Janice Tori) are the owners of the self-proclaimed "Canine Cafe", which exclusively serves junk food. A male French poodle is the waiter while his two assistants are a female Nova Scotia Duck Tolling Retriever and a female Chihuahua/Terrier mix. At the end of "Garbage Night: The Musical", they are convinced to stop eating garbage and are now living with their owners at the Haven House Children's House.
- Toby is a puppy who is adopted by Henry in "Good Night, Sweet Pups".
- Bessie (voiced by Thy Lee) is a puppy who is about to be adopted by Shannon when Katrina stops her and her parents from adopting Bessie. Cooler and Nose Marie are able to deliver Bessie to Shannon at her house.
- Shaky (voiced by Patric Zimmerman) is a Chihuahua puppy who was left traumaitzed after being abandoned by his previous owners and is traumatized. When Shaky is afraid of humans, Cooler tells his story of how the pound was founded and how he met Millicent and Holly. Shaky, convinced by Cooler's story, no longer fears humans.
- Buster (voiced by Pat Fraley) is a puppy who often turns into a tornado and breaks everything. In reality, he has no loving family to teach him manners. When the Belleveshires' library is wrecked by Catgut, the Pound Puppies think Buster does it. After the Pound Puppies and Holly are kicked out of the Beleveshires' mansion, Nose Marie blames Buster, even though Buster is not the one who wrecked the library. While the other Pound Puppies and Holly foil Katrina's plan to close down the pound, Nose Marie apologizes to Buster and Buster forgives her. Buster is later adopted by the Belveshires after making Hubert, the Belveshires' only son, happy.
- The Three Wise Guys are a trio of canine comedians who are looking for the Star Puppy in "The Star Pup". Byron P. Fleabottom (voiced by Roger Rose) is a small Aidi and his partners are Fleeco (voiced by Pat Fraley), a tall, lanky Beagle-Harrier, and Wolfie (voiced by Frank Welker), a round Bearded Collie who only honks his nose and has a crush on Bright Eyes. The Three Wise Guys are a play on the Marx Brothers, with Byron inspired by Groucho Marx, Wolfie by Harpo Marx, and Fleeco by Chico Marx.
- Arf (voiced by Kath Soucie) is a puppy who usually "arfs" in between his sentences in "The Rescue Pups". Arf is heartbroken when Jody's mother refuses to let Jody adopt him. When Jody is in trouble, Arf and the Pound Puppies, along with the Fire Department and the Police Department, rescue Jody. In the end, Jody's mother changes her mind and Arf is adopted.
- Tiny (voiced by Danny Cooksey) is a puppy with a limp who was chased out of an alley by two alley dogs who hate stray dogs. Tiny is rescued by the Pound Puppies and eventually adopted by a boy named Charlie. Tiny is inspired by Tiny Tim, a character from Charles Dickens' A Christmas Carol, who is also crippled.
- Buddy (voiced by Nancy Cartwright) is a puppy who has an "imaginary friend" named Bob (voiced by Frank Welker). To the Pound Puppies, Buddy makes up Bob whenever he causes trouble, but it turns out that Bob is actually an invisible Brontosaurus. Buddy is later adopted by Colin, whose imaginary friend is Bob's cousin, Sam.
- Yapper (voiced by Pat Fraley) is Biff Barker's agent. He usually accompanies Biff and is concerned for Biff's safety. When he and Biff find out that the Terrible Terrier is not real and learns about Katrina's plan, they rescue the Pound Puppies from being harvested for their fur.
- Pal (voiced by Brice Beckham) is a young puppy whose tail is unable to wag. Although the Pound Puppies try everything to cheer up Pal, they decide to let puppy power show him who is going to adopt him, a boy named Greg. When he hears that Greg's friend recently moved away, Pal decides to cheer him up and his tail finally wags. He is now adopted by Greg.
- Bowser (voiced by Casey Ellison) is a puppy who is kidnapped by Captain Slaughter in "The Captain and the Cats", the night before he is about to be adopted. He is later rescued by the Pound Puppies.
- Danny (voiced by Frank Welker) is Penelope's husband. He and Penelope are married and have three children. In an attempt to rescue the captured citizens of Wagga Wagga, Danny and his children are captured by Captain Slaughter. With the help of the Pound Puppies, Danny and the children are rescued and reunited with Penelope
- Clawfinger (voiced by Roger Rose) is a Bulldog criminal mastermind who wants to kidnap Pupnick and other dogs to hypnotize them under his control with a brain crystal encased in Pupnik's collar. He owns the Casino Evil. His two henchmen kidnap Bright Eyes and hold her hostage. When the other Pound Puppies and Pupnick reach his hideout at Mount Muttmore, Clawfinger is about to use his machine to brainwash all dogs in the world when Cooler, faking his hypnotized state, destroys the machine and traps Clawfinger and his men.
- Blue (voiced by Nancy Linari) is a puppy whom Jerry adopted. When the Pound Puppies hear that Jerry runs away from home, Blue decides to go along with their plan. At the end of "Kid in the Doghouse", Jerry is reunited with his parents and Blue finally has a home.
- Sir Digalot (voiced by Brennan Howard) is Cooler's ancestor, who appears in Pound Puppies and the Legend of Big Paw. He was King Arthur's pet dog. While Arthur pulls Excalibur from the Stone, Digalot pulls the Bone from the Stone, enabling humans to communicate with animals with Puppy Power.
- Sherlock Bones (voiced by Pat Fraley) is a Bloodhound detective who is hired by the Pound Puppies and Holly to search for the Pound Puppies' stolen items in "In Pups We Trust". When he finds the belongings in Howler's doghouse, he and the other Pound Puppies think he is a thief, but is actually a family of raccoons who steal the items, meaning that Howler is not a crook. He is later adopted by the building inspector after the inspector gives an award for Holly's clean pound.
- Spudge (voiced by Brian Cummings) is a homeless dog whom Howler befriends in "In Pups We Trust".
- The Crushers are a group of tough dogs whom Bright Eyes meets in "The Bright Eyes Mob". The group consists of Toots (the leader), Princefeld, a muscle-bound dog wearing a biker helmet and a white T-shirt with a picture of his mother on it, a short dog who wears a derby and a red T-shirt, and another small dog who wears a purple jacket. They trick Bright Eyes into stealing Mr. Bruno's weenies and some squeaky toys, but they give up their life of crime when they are adopted by Mrs. Vanderspiff.
- Arnold and Archie are twin puppies who Violet and the others met in the Pound Puppies Coloring Book exclusive story "A Haunted House Adventure". Their mother has been missing for two days and the twins get lost while in the Haunted House. After being rescued by the Pound Puppies, Arnold and Archie are reunited with their mother at the pound, who explains that she got stuck in a drainpipe and was rescued by Nabbit.
- Muffy (voiced by Ruth Buzzi) is a dog whom Howler bids goodbye before she is adopted in "The Captains and the Cats". She is inspired by Katharine Hepburn.
- Scratchy is a Welsh Terrier whom Nose Marie asks Jerry to give a flea bath in "Kid in the Doghouse". After spreading the fleas to everyone except Jerry, Scratchy and the others take flea baths. Later on, Jerry learns that he should be responsible for doing chores and helps the Pound Puppies and Holly clean up the Pound Puppy HQ and give Scratchy a bath. Scratchy is later adopted.
- Burlap (voiced by Nancy Cartwright) is a puppy who is put in Cage 1 in "Cooler, Come Back". He is then rescued by Terry, a boy whom Cooler tells to adopt instead.

=== Humans ===
- Holly (voiced by Ami Foster) is a kind girl with the gift of Puppy Power who owns the puppy pound in the first season. She often helps Cooler and the gang in foiling Katrina. Katrina, whom Holly addresses to her as "Auntie Katrina", uses her as a slave for housework.
- Millicent Trueblood (voiced by June Lockhart) is Katrina's great-aunt and the founder of the Puppy Pound. After Millicent's death, the pound was entrusted to Holly.
- Katrina Stoneheart (voiced by Pat Carroll) is an evil woman who gets most of Millicent Trueblood's fortune and the main villain of the TV series. She often makes Holly work for her and do the chores she and Brattina should have done. She displays an immeasurable distaste for the Pound Puppies, and all things cute in general. Her main goal in season 1 is to shut down the puppy pound, but in season 2, for some unknown reason, she owns a puppy pound of her own.
- Brattina (voiced by Adrienne Alexander) is Katrina's daughter. She often gloats with Catgut when they are winning, but is equally quick to whine and cry when they ultimately lose. Like Katrina, she hates dogs and even forces Holly to do her homework and chores.
- Captain Slaughter (voiced by Peter Cullen) is a sea captain who Katrina often hires to get rid of the Pound Puppies. He has a claw-like metallic right hand and is assumed to have lost his original hand years ago to a train accident while he was chasing Cooler. Slaughter has harbored an intense hatred for Cooler ever since. He is the direct descendant of Slaughtar, a cruel barbarian chieftain.
- Mervin (voiced by Danny Cooksey) is a young boy who Holly and Brattina have a crush on in the episode "The Fairy Dogmother". He tries to ask Holly out to a school dance, but he is too afraid to ask, which leads him to temporarily fall in love with Brattina instead.
- Carolyn (voiced by Lauren Taylor) is a girl who meets Cooler and No-name (King) at the dog pound. She later adopts No-Name and names him King after Cooler is saved from the red leash.
- Henry (voiced by Mitsuru Yamahata) is an Asian-American boy who adopts Toby.
- Colin (voiced by Dana Hill) is a brown-haired boy who has an invisible friend, Sam the Stegosaurus. He later adopts Buddy.
- Jonathon (voiced by Joshua Horowitz) is a boy whose dog, Casey, gets lost after he and his family are on a camping trip. He is later reunited with Casey.
- Mayor Fist is a mayor who is the judge at the Annual Pet Talent Show. He appears in "Bright Lights, Bright Eyes". His original appearance is in The Pound Puppies TV special, where he has a son named Arnold Fist. He is voiced by Sorrell Booke in the TV special and by Mel Blanc in "Bright Lights, Bright Eyes".
- Dabney Nabbit (voiced by Henry Gibson in the TV show, Frank Welker in "Snowbound Pound") is a dog catcher who behaves like a dog.
- Tammy and Jeff (respectively voiced by Janice Kawaye and Joey Dedio) are two teenagers who run the adoption bazaar in Pound Puppies and the Legend of Big Paw, replacing Holly's role as owner of the Puppy Pound in the first season.
- Marvin McNasty (voiced by George Rose) is the main villain of Pound Puppies and the Legend of Big Paw. He is the descendant of Sir McNasty, an evil knight who unsuccessfully attempted to take over King Arthur's kingdom. He steals half of the Bone of Scone and invents the Mean Machine to turn puppies into vicious guard dogs. After the Bone of Scone is reassembled, McNasty and his henchmen are reformed by his own machine and begin helping Tammy and Jeff at the adoption bazaar.
- Arthur (voiced by James Swodec) is a boy who becomes king after pulling Excalibur out of the stone, foiling Sir McNasty's schemes.
- Flack and Tubbs (respectively voiced by Charlie Adler and Avery Schreiber) are two dognappers who are wanted in seven states for grand theft dognapping. They dognapped Violet as a ransom to the Vanderfellers, but Violet is able to escape from them. They are last seen arrested by the police at the end of the Pound Puppies TV special.
- Bigelow (voiced by Jonathan Winters) is a pound supervisor who is appointed to be a garbage man by Mayor Fist because the Mayor's son, Arnold, is tired of garbage. After an incident, Mayor Fist fires Bigelow. At the end of the TV special, he is mistaken for capturing Flack and Tubbs and gets his original job back at the pound supervisor. Bigelow's cat, Catgut, later appears in the TV series as Katrina Stoneheart's pet.
- Arnold Fist (voiced by Ed Begley Jr.) is the son of Mayor Fist and a former garbageman. He is next in becoming pound supervisor after Bigelow gets fired, but his dream is denied when Bigelow is rehired.
- Mother Superior (voiced by June Foray) is a nun who runs the St. Francis Children's Home.
- Dr. Weston (voiced by Victoria Carroll in the TV special, Haunani Minn in "Snowbound Pound", Bever-Leigh Banfield in "Whopper Gets the Point" and "Bright Lights, Bright Eyes") is a veterinarian at the City Pound who is referred in the Pound Puppies TV special's title sequence as "The Doc". Secretly, she is a good friend of the Pound Puppies. In the second season, Weston is depicted as African-American.
- Sam Quintin (voiced by Barry Dennen) is a jewelry thief who is hired by Katrina in her plot to close Holly's puppy pound.
- Melissa (voiced by Russi Taylor) is a girl who lives at the Haven House Children's Home. She wishes for a puppy of her own. At the end of "Garbage Night: The Musical", she adopts Scrounger.
- Shannon (voiced by Kathleen Helppie-Shipley) is a curly-haired girl who wants to adopt Bessie, but Katrina stops her and her parents before they decide to adopt Bessie by telling them that the dogs are not for sale. At the end of "King Whopper", Cooler and Nose Marie deliver Bessie to Shannon.
- Jerry (voiced by Edan Gross) is a blond-haired boy who appears in "Kid in a Doghouse". His hobbies are reading comic books and skateboarding. When he requests to the Pound Puppies that he should be "adopted" with his new dog Blue, the Pound Puppies find it unorthodox, but agree anyway. When they learn that Jerry is too lazy to do chores and he runs away from home, the Pound Puppies use reverse psychology in order to get Jerry to do chores. Afterwards, Jerry promises to do his chores (including taking care of Blue) and is reunited with his parents.
- Lisa (voiced by Deonca Brown) is an African-American girl whose family is moving to another town. When Nose Marie runs away from the Pound, Lisa adopts her. Then, just before the plane takes off, the Pound Puppies stop Nose Marie and tell her that they need her very much. Lisa instead adopts Freddie and moves away.
- Kelly Williams (voiced by Garrett Morris) is an African-American police chief who is referred in the Pound Puppies title sequence as "the Chief". He has a wife and a bespectacled daughter named Sarah, who loves puppies. At first, Williams does not want Sarah to have a puppy because he thinks they eat too much, but when a life-time supply of dog food is shipped along with a puppy delivered to Sarah, Williams changes his mind.
- Dr. Black (voiced by Arthur Burghardt) is Katrina's doctor who sends her on a vacation after she has a meltdown caused by the puppies.
- Slaughtar (voiced by Peter Cullen) is a caveman who ruled over a tribe of barbarians and aspired to rule all of Earth. The members of his tribe are the ancestors of Katrina Stoneheart, Brattina, and Catgut.
- Greg (voiced by Katie Leigh) is a short, brown-haired boy who is depressed because his friend moves away. He adopts Pal so he will not be lonely anymore.
- Edgar and Chauncey (respectively voiced by Sorrell Booke and Ernie Hudson) are two police officers who chase Katrina's car in "The Rescue Pups".
- Jody (voiced by Kristina Chan) is a blond-haired girl whose mother refuses to let her adopt Arf in "The Rescue Pups". Jody's mother disapproves the adoption because having a puppy will be too much noise, and Jody runs away, but on her way to the Puppy Pound, Jody falls into a hole and calls for help. Thanks to the Pound Puppies, Arf, the Fire Department, and the Police Department, Jody is rescued and her mother finally agrees to let Jody adopt Arf.
- Charlie (voiced by Patric Zimmerman) is a red-haired boy who adopts Tiny in "Happy Howlidays".
- The Belveshires are a wealthy family who appear in "From Wags to Riches". According to Katrina, the Belveshires are the third richest couple in the country. Lord Belveshire (voiced by Clive Revill) usually speaks gibberish, so his wife, Lady Belveshire (voiced by Marilyn Lightstone) interprets for him. They have a bespectacled son named Hubert (voiced by Chad Allen), who later adopts Buster.
- Santa Claus (voiced by Clive Revill) appears in Whopper's imagination trying to find the Pound Puppies in "Happy Howlidays". Whopper fears that if Santa misses Holly's Puppy Pound, he wil give all his presents to Brattina instead.
- Mr. Hubert (voiced by Ronnie Schell) is a mailman who delivers Holly's overdue bill to Katrina in "Happy Howlidays".
- The Simons (voiced by Steve Bulen and B. J. Ward) are a family, whose dog, Shauna, is missing during a severe snowstorm in "Snowbound Pound". In a TV interview following Shauna's disappearance, they make a plea to the viewers that if Shauna is found, the Simons will reward the good Samaritan $5,000. Later, they are reunited with Shauna and her nine children after the storm ends and rewards Holly and the Pound Puppies $5,000.
- The Vanderfellers are a wealthy family from Hamstead whose dog, Violet, is dognapped by Flack and Tubbs as a ransom. Later in the film, just as Violet is about to be reunited with her owners, Flack and Tubbs try to kidnap her again. This time, however, the Pound Puppies and Bigelow stop the dognappers and save Violet. Mr. Phil and Mrs. Gloria Vanderfeller have a son and a daughter respectively named Nathan (voiced by Patric Zimmerman) and Chelsea (voiced by Laura Duff).
- Nahook (voiced by Brian Mitchell) is an Inuk boy who adopts Thunderhawk to enter the sled-race. He is jealous of his rival, Oran, who constantly makes fun of Nahook, but in the end, Nahook and Oran both lose the race to Laura Swanson. Oran and Nahook make up and Nahook still loves Thunderhawk because they know that being friends is more important than winning.
- Oran (voiced by David Mendenhall) is an Inuk boy who is Nahook's rival. He usually taunts Nahook, knowing that he will win the sled race. In the end, both Oran and Nahook lose the race to Laura Swanson and make up.
- Davie (voiced by Justin Gocke) is a blond-haired boy who is bored after the playground closes. Beezer meets him and persuade to use his imagination, therefore, he will not be bored anymore. Afterwards, Davie adopts Beezer.
- Mrs. Vanderspiff (voiced by Kath Soucie) is a socialite who attends Katrina Stoneheart's party in "The Bright Eyes Mob" to see how capable Katrina is with dogs. Just when she is about to give Katrina $1 million, Vanderspiff learns that Katrina is a fraud. Vanderspiff instead adopts Toots and her gang.
- Mrs. Gungenfeller is a socialite who is tricked by Katrina to be a judge for the Annual Pet Talent Show.
- Mr. Bruno (voiced by Brian Cummings) is the owner of Bruno's Meat Market whose weenies are stolen by Bright Eyes in "The Bright Eyes Mob".
- Matthew is a boy who participates at the Annual Pet Talent Show in "Bright Lights, Bright Eyes".
- Pierre (voiced by René Auberjonois) is a general store manager who sells Katrina Stoneheart traps to capture the Pound Puppies in "Snow Puppies". Pierre even sells a snowmobile to Katrina.
- Laura Swanson is an Inuk girl who wins the sled race with her dog in "Snow Puppies".
- Terry (voiced by Phillip Glasser) is a brown-haired boy who comes to the dog pound Cooler is staying in "Cooler, Come Back". He is unsure on which dog he should adopt until Cooler tells him to adopt Burlap. Terry then adopted Burlap, saving him from the red leash.

=== Cats ===
- Catgut (voiced by Frank Welker) is a Siamese cat belonging to Katrina Stonehart who constantly tries to cause trouble for the Pound Puppies.
- Tuffy (voiced by Frank Welker) is a Turkish Angora who is mistaken for a dog due to being very dirty. Before being cleaned, he befriends Whopper, who believes him to be a dog.
- Hairball (voiced by Frank Welker) is a Nebelung cat named for his tendency to hack up hairballs.
- Charlamange (voiced by Cathy Cavadini) is a Colorpoint Shorthair who is Hairball's girlfriend.
- Mouseketeers (voiced by Barry Dennen, Chuck McCann, and Adrienne Alexander) are a trio of cats whom the Pound Puppies meet in "The Captain and the Cats". They are led by Dumas (voiced by Clive Revill). The group is based on the eponymous characters of The Three Musketeers, with Dumas being named after author Alexandre Dumas.
- Alley Cats (voiced by Frank Welker) are a duo of cats who try to beat up Bright Eyes in "Bright Eyes, Come Home".

=== Other ===
- Silver Paw (voiced by Erf Immeman) is a leader of the wolves who, hence his namesake, has a front silver-like paw. Silver Paw and his tribe helps the Pound Puppies cross Danger Mountain to help Casey find his owners. Cooler saves him just before Danger Mountain collapse and Silver Paw, in return, keeps Katrina busy.
- Shadow Monster (voiced by Charlie Adler) is a creature who personifies Whopper's fear of the dark.
- Cheep Cheep (voiced by Frank Welker) is a baby bird who is injured after an attempt to fly. He is rescued from Catgut by Bright Eyes and is able to recover at the Pound Puppies HQ, but Cheep Cheep begins behaving like a dog. He is later reunited with his parents after he is able to fly.
- Cooler Wolf (voiced by Dan Gilvezan) is Cooler's ancestor in "Casey, Come Home".
- Red Alert Pup (voiced by Don Messick) is an alarm system at the Pound Puppy HQ.
- Robotic Rover (voiced by Frank Welker) is a robotic dog built by Katrina Stoneheart to fool Mrs. Vanderspiff into thinking that Katrina loves dogs.
- Squiggly (voiced by Frank Welker) is a young caterpillar whom Whopper makes friends with in "Dog and Caterpillar". When Squiggly saves Whopper from Catgut, Whopper and Squiggly are good friends. Later, Squiggly later metamorphosizes into a butterfly and says goodbye to Whopper.
- Rocky (voiced by Steve Bulen) is the head of a family of racoons who steal the Pound Puppies' items in "In Pups We Trust". The raccoons insist that they will not stop stealing because it is in their nature. Rocky and his family make amends with the Pound Puppies and help rebuild the pound when it is wrecked by Catgut.
- Blabber (voiced by Frank Welker) is a mouse who participated at the Annual Pet Talent Show in "Bright Lights, Bright Eyes".

== See also ==
- Pound Puppies
- Pound Puppies (film)
