= Tonka Construction 2 =

1999 video game

- Developer: ImaginEngine
- Publisher: Hasbro Interactive
- Series: Tonka
- Platform: Windows
- Release: October 1999
- Genre: Simulation
- Mode: Single player

Tonka Construction 2 is a 1999 video game developed by ImaginEngine and published by Hasbro Interactive. It is the follow up to the original Tonka Construction and is intended for ages 5 and up.

== Gameplay ==
Tonka Construction 2 places the player in Tonka Land, where they work alongside Tonka Joe and the Tonka Team to complete construction‑focused activities across four distinct areas. Using a selection of heavy equipment vehicles—such as an excavator, cement mixer, dump truck, and crane—the player performs tasks by controlling each machine with the mouse. In Tonka City and Tonka Mountain, the player can freely build, demolish, and rebuild structures, assembling elements like doors, windows, rooftops, and decorative items to create cities or resort environments. Tonka Desert centers on clearing land for new roadways and then constructing a tourist town around the completed routes. In the Tonka Quarry, the player digs through the terrain to uncover three hidden pieces of ancient treasures and assembles them once all parts are found. Navigation is handled through on‑screen icons, including a time clock, a back arrow, and a cell phone for additional help. Progress can be saved under individual sign‑in names, and completed designs can be printed, saved to disk, or emailed.

== Development ==
Tonka Construction 2 was developed by ImaginEngine, a company founded in 1994.

== Reception ==
Kids Domain praised the game's humor. The Birmingham News recommended the game to young boys or girls who enjoy playing with trucks. The Canadian Toy Testing Council gave Tonka Construction 2 three stars on a scale of three stars, two stars, one star, novelty, not recommended.

Tonka Construction 2 ranked 9th on PC Data's list of Top-Selling Games Software for the week of November 28 to December 4 in 1999.
