= Pound Puppies (1986 TV series) =

American animated television series

- The 1987 Pound Puppies relaunch series card
- Also known as: All New Pound Puppies (season 2)
- Genre: Comedy; Adventure
- Directed by: Don Lusk; Art Davis (season 1); Carl Urbano (season 1); Rudy Zamora (season 1); Bob Goe (season 2); John Kimball (season 2); Jay Sarbry (season 2); Paul Sommer (season 2)
- Voices of: Adrienne Alexander; Ruth Buzzi; Pat Carroll; Nancy Cartwright; Peter Cullen; Ami Foster; Dan Gilvezan; Robert Morse; B. J. Ward; Frank Welker
- Theme music composer: Hoyt Curtin
- Opening theme: "We're Pound Puppies"
- Ending theme: "We're Pound Puppies" (instrumental)
- Composer: Hoyt Curtin
- Country of origin: United States
- Original language: English
- No. of seasons: 2
- No. of episodes: 26 (36 segments)

Production
- Executive producers: William Hanna; Joseph Barbera
- Producer: Kay Wright
- Editors: Gil Iverson; Robert Ciaglia (season 2)
- Running time: 24 minutes
- Production companies: Hanna-Barbera Productions; Tonka

Original release
- Network: ABC
- Release: September 13, 1986 – December 19, 1987

Related
- Pound Puppies

Pound Puppies (known as All New Pound Puppies in its second season) is an American animated series made by Hanna-Barbera Productions and based on the toyline by Tonka, and acts as the sequel to the 1985 television special. Broadcast on ABC from September 13, 1986 until December 19, 1987, the franchise was rebooted for the 2010 series. 26 episodes (36 segments in total) were produced.

== Plot ==
A young girl named Holly made it her mission to help protect her canine friends Cooler, Nose Marie, Bright Eyes, Howler, Whopper, and other pound puppies from her Aunt Katrina Stoneheart who hates dogs.

Katrina, her daughter, Brattina, and their pet feline Catgut devise elaborate schemes to sabotage the pound and even destroy the puppies outright, sometimes enlisting the help of the monstrous Captain Slaughter (in Season One), but Holly and her anthropomorphized canine friends always manage to come out on top.

== Cast ==
Main cast voices:

- Adrienne Alexander – Bright Eyes (TV special only), Brattina
- Ruth Buzzi – Nose Marie
- Pat Carroll – Katrina Stoneheart
- Nancy Cartwright – Bright Eyes
- Peter Cullen – Captain Slaughter
- Ami Foster – Holly
- Dan Gilvezan – Cooler, Bruno (in "The Bright Eyes Mob")
- Robert Morse – Howler, Barkerville (Wagga Wagga)
- B. J. Ward – Whopper
- Frank Welker – Catgut, Scrounger (season one), Nabbit (in "Snowbound Pound")

=== Additional voices ===
- Chad Allen (season 1)
- René Auberjonois (season 2)
- Bever-Leigh Banfield (season 2)
- Allyce Beasley (season 2) – Beezer (in "The Wonderful World of Whopper")
- Brice Beckham (season 2)
- Greg Berg – Beamer (uncredited)
- Gregg Berger (season 2) – Scrounger (in "Garbage Night: The Musical")
- Denoca Brown (season 2)
- Steve Bulen (season 1)
- Arthur Burghardt (season 1)
- Kristina Chan (season 2)
- Danny Cooksey
- Brian Cummings (season 1)
- Jim Cummings (season 2)
- Gabriel Damon (season 2)
- Barry Dennen
- Robert DoQui (season 1)
- Casey Ellison (season 1)
- Dick Erdman (season 1)
- Pat Fraley (season 1)
- Lauri Fraser (season 2)
- Joan Gardner (season 1) – Zazu the Fairy Dogmother (in "The Fairy Dogmother" and "Happy Howlidays")
- Linda Gary (season 1)
- Phillip Glasser (season 2)
- Justin Gocke (season 2)
- Benji Gregory (season 2)
- Edan Gross (season 2)
- Kathleen Helppie (season 2)
- Lise Hilboldt (season 2)
- Dana Hill (season 2) – Toots (in "The Bright Eyes Mob")
- Josh Horowitz (season 2)
- Ernie Hudson (season 2)
- Erv Immerman (season 2)
- Vaughn Jelks (season 2)
- Thy Lee (season 2)
- Katie Leigh (season 2)
- Michael Lembeck (season 2)
- Marilyn Lightstone (season 1)
- Nancy Linari (season 2)
- June Lockhart (season 1) – Millicent Trueblood (in "How to Found a Pound")
- Chuck McCann (season 1)
- David Mendenhall (season 2)
- Don Messick – Scooby-Doo (in "Secret Agent Pup", uncredited), Red Alarm Pup (uncredited)
- Haunani Minn (season 1)
- Brian Stokes Mitchell (season 2)
- Lorenzo Music (season 2) – Teensy (in "Little Big Dog")
- Patricia Parris (season 2)
- Philip Proctor (season 2)
- Clive Revill (season 1)
- Susan Rhee (season 2)
- Roger Rose (season 1)
- Ann Ryerson (season 2)
- Ronnie Schell (season 1)
- Kath Soucie (season 2) – Arf (in "The Rescue Pups")
- Leslie Speights (season 2)
- John Stephenson (season 1) – Uncle J.R. (in "Whopper Cries Uncle")
- Lauren Taylor (season 2)
- Russi Taylor (season 2) – Melissa (in "Garbage Night: The Musical")
- Janice Tori (season 2)
- Marcelo Tubert (season 2)
- R. J. Williams (season 2)
- Mitsuru Yamahata (season 2)
- Dion Zamora (season 2)
- Patric Zimmerman (season 1) – Shaky (in "How to Found a Pound")

== Episodes ==
=== Season 1 (1986) ===
No. overall	No. in season	Title	Written by	Original release date	Prod. code
1	1	"Bright Eyes, Come Home"	Tom Ruegger	September 13, 1986	333–221
After Bright Eyes was unable to be adopted at Adoption Day, a mysterious man by the name of Sam Quintin arrives at Holly's puppy pound and views her as a star, but unknown to the gang, Quintin is a con artist and a jewelry robber.
2	2	"How to Found a Pound"	Earl Kress and Tom Ruegger	September 20, 1986	333–223
The Pound Puppies tell their story of how Holly became the owner of a puppy pound that was founded by the old lady Millicent Trueblood and how they came face-to-face with the villainous Katrina Stoneheart for the very first time even after Millicent passes away.
3	3	"From Wags to Riches"	George Atkins and Charles M. Howell, IV	September 27, 1986	333–234
The Pound Puppies and Holly meet Buster, a puppy who is "a walking natural disaster". They are later invited to the Bellveshires' mansion in hopes of saving the pound from Katrina Stoneheart's latest dastardly plot.
4	4	"Snowbound Pound"	Denis Higgins, John Bradford, Tom Ruegger, and Charles M. Howell, IV	October 4, 1986	333–235
The Pound Puppies rescue a pregnant dog from a severe snowstorm, but when the power gets knocked out, it is up to Cooler, Howler, and Whopper to find a nearby veterinarian while the girls tend to the soon-to-be mother.
5	5	"The Fairy Dogmother"	Jim Ryan	October 11, 1986	333–237
After wishing upon a star, the Pound Puppies meet an oddball fairy dog mother named Zazu, in hopes of helping Holly win the heart of a young boy named Mervin.
6	6	"Whopper Cries Uncle"	Gordon Bressack	October 18, 1986	333–236
When Whopper's uncle JR comes for a visit, the Pound Puppies and Holly, desperate to get money for dog food, disguise themselves as a wealthy family in order to impress him. Uncle JR however has a secret of his own.
7	7	"In Pups We Trust"	Story by : June Patterson and Wendy West; Teleplay by : Tom Ruegger and Charles M. Howell, IV	October 25, 1986	333–238
Accusations fly when the Pound Puppies' beloved items were stolen. Although none of the pups knew who the real culprit is, the Pound Puppies still grew suspicious of each other. This causes Howler to take his leave and meets a vagrant dog. This also leads to the first encounter with Captain Slaughter.
8	8	"The Captain and the Cats"	Mark Edens	November 1, 1986	333–240
While in pursuit of rescuing Whopper from the evil Captain Slaughter, the Pound Puppies and Holly meet a trio of strange cats who wanted Captain Slaughter to capture them.
9	9	"Secret Agent Pup"	Earl Kress, Tom Ruegger, and Charles M. Howell, IV	November 8, 1986	333–239
After Bright Eyes is kidnapped by Clawfinger's two foreign spies, the other Pound Puppies, along with a friendly puppy from Mongrelia named Pupnick, go on an adventure to save Bright Eyes.
10	10	"Wagga-Wagga"	Tom Ruegger and Gordon Bressack	November 15, 1986	333–241
Cooler meets his long-lost girlfriend Penelope, but is still angry whenever her name is mentioned. It all had something to do with Captain Slaughter and the once-existed town of Wagga Wagga that Captain Slaughter decimated.
11	11	"The Star Pup"	Tom Ruegger and Earl Kress	November 22, 1986	333–242
Three Marx Brothers-esque dogs come to the pound and find the Star Pup, a special puppy with a heart-shaped marking. When it seems to be revealed as Nose Marie, she has to go and help other puppies. Meanwhile, Captain Slaughter looks for the Star Pup.
12	12	"Happy Howlidays"	Charles M. Howell, IV and Earl Kress	November 29, 1986	333–243
Holly and the puppies lose the pound after Katrina hid overdue bills. With no home for the puppies, it is up to the help of Zazu to make Katrina reconsider re-opening the pound.
13	13	"Ghost Hounders"	Gordon Bressack	December 6, 1986	333–244
When the Terrible Terrier haunts Holly's Puppy Pound, the Pound Puppies turn to Biff Barker, a famous dog actor from a well-known TV series, "Ghost Hounders", for help.

=== Season 2 (1987) ===
For this season, episodes (with the exception of the final three) are now split into two 11-minute segments.

No. overall	No. in season	Title	Written by	Original release date	Prod. code
14	1	"Whopper Gets the Point" "The Bird Dog"	Earl Kress and Tom Ruegger Wayne Kaatz and Tom Ruegger	September 26, 1987	334–221
Whopper learns that not all shots are painful. Bright Eyes saves an injured baby bird from Catgut.
15	2	"Tail of the Pup" "King Whopper"	Earl Kress George Atkins	October 3, 1987	334–223
The Pound Puppies meet a puppy that cannot wag its tail. Whopper comes in charge while Cooler and Nose Marie are gone.
16	3	"Tuffy Gets Fluffy" "Casey, Come Home"	Troy Schmidt and John K. Ludin Earl Kress	October 10, 1987	334–234
The Pound Puppies are in for a surprise after a dirty dog becomes clean. The Pound Puppies embark on a dangerous adventure to return a lost puppy to his owners.
17	4	"Where Do Puppies Come From?" "Pups on the Loose"	George Atkins Mary Jo Ludin	October 17, 1987	334–235
The Pound Puppies meet parents-to-be Lucy and Rusty, and Whopper and Bright Eyes want to know where Puppies come from. The Pound Puppies try to figure out a way to stop Lucy and Rusty's pups from fighting.
18	5	"The Invisible Friend" "Kid in the Doghouse"	Wayne Kaatz Haskell Barkin, Earl Krees, and Tom Ruegger	October 24, 1987	334–237
The Pound Puppies meet a puppy named Buddy, who has an imaginary friend named "Bob". A lost kid named Jerry wants stay with the Pound Puppies, but the Pound Puppies want to find Jerry a new home, as Jerry said that he wants to be adopted.
19	6	"Little Big Dog / The Bright Eyes Mob"	Little Big Dog: Earl Kress and Cliff Roberts The Bright Eyes Mob: George Atkins and Tom Ruegger	October 31, 1987	334–236
Little Big Dog: Nose Marie rescues a small puppy from Catgut and has grown attached to him, and he becomes a fully grown adult dog. The Bright Eyes Mob: Bright Eyes meets a group of tough dogs and does their dirty work, making the public to mistake her as a wanted criminal.
20	7	"Good Night, Sweet Pups / The Rescue; Pups"	Good Night, Sweet Pups: Paul Dini and John K. Ludin The Rescue Pups: Mary Jo Ludin	November 7, 1987	334–238
Good Night, Sweet Pups: Whopper must conquer his fear of the dark after numerous nightmares. The Rescue Pups: A girl runs away from home after mom refuses to let her adopt a puppy. Absent: Holly
21	8	"Nose Marie Day / Snow Puppies"	Nose Marie Day: Haskell Barkin, John K. Ludin, and Tom Ruegger Snow Puppies: George Atkins and Earl Kress	November 14, 1987	334–240
Nose Marie Day: The Pound Puppies invent a holiday dedicated to Nose Marie. Snow Puppies: The Pound Puppies journey to the arctic and a high-speed chase through the snow thanks to Katrina Stoneheart.
22	9	"Where's the Fire? / The Wonderful World of Whopper"	Where's the Fire?: Paul Dini The Wonderful World of Whopper: George Atkins and Earl Kress	November 21, 1987	334–239
Where's the Fire?: The Pound Puppies meet Sparky, a retriever who wants to be a fire-dog, but Whopper tries to change Sparky's personality. 'The Wonderful World of Whopper: Whopper helps the puppy to snap out of her persistent boredom.
23	10	"Bright Lights, Bright Eyes / Dog and Caterpillar"	Bright Lights, Bright Eyes: Haskell Barkin, John K. Ludin, and Tom Ruegger Dog and Caterpillar: Earl Kress, Tom Ruegger, and John K. Ludin	November 28, 1987	334–241
Bright Lights, Bright Eyes: Bright Eyes is participating in a pet talent contest. Dog and Caterpillar: Whopper befriends a young caterpillar.
24	11	"Garbage Night: The Musical"	Wayne Kaatz, Tom Ruegger, and John K. Ludin	December 5, 1987	334–242
In the only musical episode ever produced, the Pound Puppies must reform a group of dogs who eat nothing but junk-food every day.
25	12	"Peter Pup"	Wayne Kaatz, John K. Ludin, Tom Ruegger, and Kristina Mazzotti	December 12, 1987	334–243
After Whopper and Bright Eyes accidentally break a TV, Holly reads them a story about a puppy who lies (Whopper), an evil queen (Katrina), a magical land, and Peter Pup (Cooler) himself, in which the pups participate in an adventure of their own.
26	13	"Cooler, Come Back"	Mary Jo Ludin, Tom Ruegger, and John K. Ludin	December 19, 1987	334–244
Cooler is kidnapped by Katrina, taken to a dog pound somewhere in the USA, and meets a stubborn dog who refuses to be adopted while his friends try desperately to find him.

== Home media ==
Various episodes of the show had been released on VHS between 1988 and 1990 by Family Home Entertainment.

== See also ==
- List of Pound Puppies characters
