= Rainbow Butterfly Unicorn Kitty =

2019 animated television series

- Also known as: RBUK
- Genre: Adventure; Comedy; Fantasy
- Created by: Rich Magallanes; Melissa Reale (Note: Rich Magallanes receives a "series created by" credit, while Reale receives no credit.)
- Developed by: Rich Magallanes; Mark Palmer (co-developer)
- Voices of: Allegra Clark; Arturo Sandoval; Katie Leigh; Laila Berzins
- Theme music composer: Noam Kaniel
- Opening theme: "Main Title Theme Song" by Noam Kaniel
- Composer: Noam Kaniel
- Countries of origin: United States; Canada
- Original language: English
- No. of seasons: 1
- No. of episodes: 26 (51 segments)

Production
- Executive producers: King Cheng; Randy Shoemaker; Shirley Price; Rich Magallanes
- Producers: Aaron Simpson; Kris Marvin Hughes
- Running time: 11 minutes; 22 minutes ("Merry Mythmas" only)
- Production companies: Funrise Entertainment; Bardel Entertainment

Original release
- Network: Nickelodeon (episodes 1 and 6–15); Nicktoons (episodes 2–5 and 16–26)
- Release: January 28 – December 1, 2019

Rainbow Butterfly Unicorn Kitty, officially shortened to RBUK (/ɑːrbʌk/, ARR-buk), is an animated television series created by Rich Magallanes and Melissa Reale and based on a concept by Reale. It was co-developed by Magallanes and Mark Palmer. The series was produced by the Canadian animation studio Bardel Entertainment.

In the United States, Nickelodeon acquired broadcast rights to the series from Funrise Toys. 26 episodes were produced.

== Premise ==
The series follows Felicity, a spirited magical cat who is part rainbow, part butterfly, part unicorn and 100% kitty, as she goes on adventures with her best friends in the mashup city of Mythlandia.

== Plot ==
Rainbow Butterfly Unicorn Kitty is about a young magical cat named Felicity, who is part rainbow, part butterfly, part unicorn and 100% kitty. She has transformative powers that allow her to choose between Rainbow Power, Butterfly Power, Unicorn Power, and following the events of Purrfect Party, Kitty Power. Her best friends; Miguel, a down-to-earth Anubis chihuahua, Athena, a book-smart owl, and Yana the ditzy yeti, accompany Felicity on their various mythical adventures in Mythlandia, a city full of fairy tale creatures, wizards, giants, dragons, and much more, while also occasionally hanging out together at Mythic Malts, a restaurant owned by Moona that sells delicious malts.

Each episode has been stated to "explore female empowerment and non-conformity" as Felicity transforms into different forms using her magical abilities. The series is also a celebration of individuality and self-confidence.

== Characters ==
=== Main ===
- Felicity (voiced by Allegra Clark) is a sassy, fearless magical cat who is part rainbow, butterfly, and unicorn. She possesses transformative powers that allow her to lasso items in the form of a rainbow, produce thunderous claps and wind from her butterfly wings, fire lasers from her unicorn horn, and her kitten paws can shoot glow sticks and use her cuteness.
- Miguel (voiced by Arturo Sandoval) is a blue down-to-earth, active and energetic Anubis chihuahua, who is Felicity's best friend. King Nacho (Billy Bongo) is his Anubis dog ancestor.
- Athena (voiced by Katie Leigh) is a book-smart owl and one of Felicity's friends. She speaks in a very monotone voice.
- Yana (voiced by Laila Berzins) is a ditzy yeti and is also one of Felicity's friends.

=== Recurring ===
- The Sun (played by Michael Sorich) is a sentient sun with a live-action human face. He also has skinny arms and is able to talk. Being the Sun, he oversees the many adventures of the main cast and occasionally commentates, or silently reacts to them. As shown in "The Sand Crab Man", he also turns into the Moon at night.
- Rudy (voiced by Chase Mitchell) is a snarky rat that pretends to be a rabbit. He often causes trouble for Felicity and her friends.
- Timmy (voiced by Rich Magallanes) is a little Kraken who often causes trouble.
- Mayor Snowball (voiced by Dorothy Elias-Fahn) is the mayor of Catlantic City. Her former rival is Mayor Wags (Kyle Hebert).
- The Sand Crab Man (voiced by Doug Stone) helps the other citizens of Mythlandia with falling asleep.
- Moona (voiced by Sara Cravens) is a cow and the owner of Mythic Malts. She dates Oscar Go, a slow French snail.
- Chippy (voiced by Cristina Vee) is a chipmunk-like creature.
- Andy (voiced by Kyle Hebert) is a dragon.
- Hank is a hippo that is part Bumblebee, Magnetic and Karaoke.

== Episodes ==
No.	Title	Written by	Storyboarded by	Original release date	Prod. code	US viewers (millions)
Nickelodeon
1	"Purrfect Party"	Story by : Rich Magallanes; Teleplay by : Mark Palmer, Ray DeLaurentis & Will Schifrin	Raven Molisee	January 27, 2019 (sneak peek); January 28, 2019 (premiere) (Note: This episode was released early on the Nick app and VOD on January 18, 2019.)	101	0.88
1	"Anubis Newbie"	Ray DeLaurentis & Will Schifrin	Kat Dela Cruz	January 27, 2019 (sneak peek); January 28, 2019 (premiere)	101	0.88
When Felicity and Miguel are invited to the annual party at the Palace of the Perfect, Felicity worries that her powers won't measure up for it as the most powerful citizens in Mythlandia will be there. Miguel gets tested by an ancient Anubis king to see if he's ready to leave Mythlandia and become the next ruler of the underworld.
Nicktoons
2	"Catlantic City"	Ray DeLaurentis & Will Schifrin	Bob Baxter	January 29, 2019	102	0.10
2	"Scaredy Cat"	Ray DeLaurentis & Will Schifrin	Garrett O' Donoghue	January 29, 2019	102	0.10
Miguel gets locked up in the pound for being a dog after he's bought to Catlantic City by Felicity. Felicity, Miguel, Yana, and Athena have to cross the Phobia Forest so they can cash in their coupons for free cupcakes.
3	"It Takes Two to Talent"	Ray DeLaurentis & Will Schifrin	Raven Molisee	January 30, 2019	104	0.08
3	"Pot Luck"	Andrew Zuber	Bob Baxter	January 30, 2019	104	0.08
Felicity and Miguel take part in a talent show in order to get malts named after them, but they have trouble coming up with their act. Felicity and Miguel help a worried leprechaun find his purpose.
4	"Sleeping Yeti"	Ray DeLaurentis & Will Schifrin	Larry Hall	January 31, 2019	103	0.08
4	"The Sand Crab Man"	Ray DeLaurentis & Will Schifrin	James Bourne	January 31, 2019	103	0.08
Yana eats a witch's apple and falls asleep, so Felicity and Miguel try to find a way to break the spell. Felicity has so much fun at her party that she convinces the Sand Crab Man to take the night off, causing chaos in Mythlandia.
5	"The Loch Mess Monster"	Greg Grabianski	Garrett O' Donoghue	February 1, 2019	105	N/A
5	"Mighty Meow and Super Lucha"	Ray DeLaurentis & Will Schifrin	Kat Dela Cruz	February 1, 2019	105	N/A
The Loch Mess Monster moves in with Miguel as his house is messy. Note: A pun on The Loch Ness Monster. Felicity and Miguel pretend to be real superheroes and draw the wrath of a supervillain called The Couch Potato.
Nickelodeon
6	"Rainbow Butterfly Unicorn Cupid"	Gene Grillo	Bob Baxter	February 10, 2019	110B	0.82
Moona announces that she's closing Mythic Malts.
7	"The Green-Eyed Monster"	Lissa Kapstrom	Raven Molisee	February 10, 2019	109A	0.82
Miguel invites a cute chipmunk-like creature, Chippy, to join him and Felicity on their friend-iversary. However, Chippy isn't all she seems.
8	"Gone with the Wand"	Ray DeLaurentis & Will Schifrin	Larry Hall	February 17, 2019	106	1.07
8	"Fountain of Too Much Youth"	David Grubstick	James Bourne	February 17, 2019	106	1.07
Felicity and her friends find a magic wand that they use to make crazy wishes with until they locate the wand's rightful owner. Miguel's favorite malt is now on the kids menu.
9	"Nobody's Purrfect"	David Grubstick	Bob Baxter	February 23, 2019	109B	0.82
Felicity tries too hard to be purfect with a bedazzling sparkling kitty collar.
10	"Mythic Mounties"	Gene Grillo	Raven Molisee	February 23, 2019	110A	0.82
The gang join a scouting group, but Felicity has a hard time winning the praise of her scoutmaster and earning a merit badge.
11	"Snack Attack"	Grant Levy and Dominik Rothbard	TBA	March 2, 2019	107	0.81
11	"The Backward Bug"	Dani Michaeli	TBA	March 2, 2019	107	0.81
Felicity's favorite snack has been sabotaged, so she visits the Snacktory. The Backwards Bug bites Miguel and Athena, which causes them to speak backwards.
12	"Denzel in Distress"	Ray DeLaurentis & Will Schifrin Greg Grabianski	TBA	March 9, 2019	111	0.69
12	"Meanotaur"	Ray DeLaurentis & Will Schifrin Greg Grabianski	TBA	March 9, 2019	111	0.69
Felicity and Miguel rescue Prince Denzel, who was imprisoned by his evil brother, Prince Larry. When Felicity loses her favorite toy, she and her friends try to retrieve it from the yard of her dreaded neighbor, the Meanotaur.
13	"Palace of the Powerless"	David Grubstick	TBA	March 16, 2019	112	0.77
13	"My Fair Yeti"	Gene Grillo	TBA	March 16, 2019	112	0.77
Felicity and Miguel attend a costume party at the Palace of the Perfect, where they end up in a fight to take back some stolen powers. When Yana is invited to a fancy society event, she is afraid that she'll make a fool of herself.
14	"The Boaracle"	Lissa Kapstrom	Raven Molisee & Bob Bakter	March 31, 2019	113	0.67
14	"Out of the Box"	Ray DeLaurentis & Will Schifrin	Raven Molisee & Bob Bakter	March 31, 2019	113	0.67
The Boaracle, a boar who claims to predict the future, makes a series of predictions about Miguel that all come true. When Felicity's fun unboxing videos go viral, a jealous Rudy slips Pandora's box into her scratching post house.
15	"A Big Baby"	Jordan Gershowitz	Paul Villeco & Kat Dela Cruz	April 7, 2019	114	0.65
15	"Mythic Macaroons"	John N. Huss	Paul Villeco & Kat Dela Cruz	April 7, 2019	114	0.65
Felicity and Miguel babysit a baby giant, but things quickly escalate out of control. Felicity's Mythic Mounties troop sells cookies to raise money so they can save their favorite park.
16	"Rudy Awakening"	David Grubstick	TBA	April 14, 2019	118	0.54
16	"Bound to Be Friends"	Jordan Gershowitz	TBA	April 14, 2019	118	0.54
It's Eggtober, and Rudy is scared everyone will discover he's lying about being related to the Easter Bunny. Felicity and Miguel become stuck together by magical friendship bracelets that will only unlock if they prove they're really best friends.
17	"The Return of Mighty Meow and Super Lucha"	David Grubstick	Larry Hall & James Bourne	April 28, 2019	115	0.72
17	"Grumplestiltskin"	Lissa Kapstrom	Larry Hall & James Bourne	April 28, 2019	115	0.72
When Felicity visits Mirror Rock with Miguel, she accidentally releases the evil mirror image of herself, Evil Felicity. Felicity has a big party to celebrate her Cat-ceanara, in which she'll officially go from kittenhood to cathood.
Nicktoons
18	"The Trouble with Travis"	John N. Huss	TBA	June 21, 2019 (Note: These episodes were released early on the Nick app and VOD sometime in early June.)	116A	N/A
In order for a genie to grant more wishes, Felicity must get the last person who found the lamp to complete an unmade wish.
19	"Tooth or Consequences"	Ray DeLaurentis & Will Schifrin	TBA	June 28, 2019	116B	N/A
Someone steals the gold coins the Saber Tooth Fairy exchanges for loose teeth.
20	"The Boogie Man"	Ray DeLaurentis & Will Schifrin	Paul Villeco and Kat Dela cruz	July 5, 2019	117A	N/A
While getting ready for a big dance competition, Felicity starts having nightmares about the Boogie Man.
21	"The Souper Monster"	Jordan Gershowitz	Paul Villeco and Kat Dela cruz	July 19, 2019	117B	0.25
In order to help Miguel win Mythlandia's annual cook-off competition, Felicity buys him a bag of magic beans.
22	"The Winky"	Ray DeLaurentis & Will Schifrin	TBA	July 26, 2019	119A	N/A
Overwhelmed by the responsibility of owning her first pet, a cute but mischievous creature called a Winky.
23	"Trivial Per Hoot"	Lissa Kapstrom	TBA	August 2, 2019	119B	N/A
Athena loses her confidence when, for the first time ever, she gets a fact about Mythlandia wrong.
24	"Small Change"	Ray DeLaurentis & Will Schifrin	Ben McSweeney and Kat Dela Cruz	August 9, 2019	120A	0.11
Felicity questions what she's meant to be when she baby-sits a little changeling girl struggling with the same issue.
25	"Rip Van Stinkle"	Lissa Kapstrom	Ben McSweeney and Kat Dela Cruz	August 16, 2019	120B	0.13
When Felicity comes to the aid of a stinky stranger named Rip Van Stinkle, he vows to be at her beck and call for life. Note: A pun on Rip Van Winkle.
26	"Excali-Burt"	Ray DeLaurentis & Will Schifrin	TBA	August 23, 2019	121A	N/A
Felicity pulls a legendary talking sword named "Excali-Burt" from a stone and is rewarded with her own magical castle.
27	"Ratted Out"	Kris Marvin Hughes	TBA	August 30, 2019	121B	0.13
Rudy begs Mighty Meow and Super Lucha to give him a shot at being their sidekick.
28	"Just Add Sprinkles"	Ray DeLaurentis & Will Schifrin	Raven Molisee, Bob Baxter, and Justin Wallace	September 8, 2019	122A	N/A
Felicity calls a magic, but mischievous, pixie to make her malts delicious.
29	"The Write Stuff"	Jordan Gershowitz	Raven Molisee, Bob Baxter, and Justin Wallace	September 15, 2019	122B	0.12
Felicity's new pen has a way with words, making them a reality.
30	"Smart Cookie"	Ray DeLaurentis & Will Schifrin	TBA	September 22, 2019	123A	N/A
Yana eats a cookie to level up her smarts, but realizes it's her heart that makes her special.
31	"Disappearing Act"	Lissa Kapstorm	TBA	October 13, 2019	123B	N/A
Miguel learns a new trick, which gets him completely lost.
32	"Bumblebee Magnetic Karaoke Hippo"	David Grubstick	Tom Galvin and James Bourne	October 20, 2019	124A	N/A
Felicity helps a mashup creature to realize his true potential.
33	"Time Out"	Ray DeLaurentis & Will Schifrin	Tom Galvin and James Bourne	November 3, 2019	124B	N/A
Felicity borrows Father Time's watch.
34	"Playing the Piper"	Kris Marvin Hughes	TBA	November 10, 2019	125A	N/A
Miguel's sudden rise to stardom during Rat Con has some consequences.
35	"Shrinking Yeti"	Lissa Kapstorm	TBA	November 17, 2019	125B	0.13
Yana begins to shrink after receiving a gift.
36	"Little Monster"	Ray DeLaurentis & Will Schifrin	TBA	November 24, 2019	126	N/A
36	"The Great Mighty Mythic Marathon"	Rich Magallanes	TBA	November 24, 2019	126	N/A
Timmy asks Felicity and Miguel to baby sit his nephew. All of Mythlandia competes for the ultimate prize..
37	"Merry Mythmas"	Ray DeLaurentis, Lissa Kapstrom, and Will Schifrin	TBA	December 1, 2019	108	N/A
When Santa Paws takes the year off, Felicity is chosen to replace him and deliver the Mythmas presents to all of Mythlandia. Rudy teams up with Timmy the Kraken to try and ruin Mythmas.

== Production ==
Rainbow Butterfly Unicorn Kitty is produced by Funrise, who took over production of the series for Saban Brands after its closure due to the sale of the majority of its entertainment properties to Hasbro. The series is animated by Bardel Entertainment, and it features photo-real elements. The series is targeted towards children aged 6 to 11.

The series has a total of 52 11-minute episodes. For broadcast, each episode is paired with another to fill a 22-minute slot, which makes for a total of 26 half-hours. The final episode of the series however, is a two-part holiday special.

== Broadcast ==
Rainbow Butterfly Unicorn Kitty was originally planned to be launched in Fall 2018, but was postponed to 2019. In the United States, the series had a sneak peek premiere on the main Nickelodeon network on January 27, 2019, before it had its season premiere on Nicktoons a day after. The series returned to Nicktoons on June 21, 2019, starting with the episode "The Trouble with Travis", and premiering all segments on separate days. The series was added to Paramount+ on September 22, 2021.

Jetpack Distribution announced that it acquired international distribution rights in Canada, Latin America, Europe (excluding Italy and Russia), Australia, Asia, Africa, and the Middle East. The series premiered on some of Nickelodeon's international channels and branded blocks following the U.S. launch later in 2019. In Canada, the series debuted on Family Channel on September 2, 2019. The series premiered January 1, 2020 on eToonz in South Africa.

== Reception ==
=== Critical reception ===
Emily Ashby of Common Sense Media gave the series 2 out of 5 stars; saying that, “Felicity's unique nature makes her a decent example of embracing uniqueness in yourself and in others, but the show's frantic pace and distracting visuals tend to overshadow this positive quality.”

== Merchandise ==
The associated toy line for the series by Funrise Toys is planned to cover many categories such as figurines, playsets, bobble heads, plush and dress-up. In February 2019, there was a preview of new toys from Funrise at the New York Toy Fair. The toys were released at Walmart on July 1, 2019.
