= Tonka Search & Rescue =

- Developer: Media Station
- Publisher: Hasbro Interactive
- Platforms: Windows; Macintosh
- Release: October 1997
- Genre: Action Adventure

Tonka Search & Rescue is a 1997 video game developed by Media Station and published by Hasbro Interactive. It is a sequel to Tonka Construction.

== Gameplay ==
In Tonka Search & Rescue, the player selects missions and activities focused on rescue and repair. The player begins in the Dispatch Center, choosing tasks to undertake. In the Garage, the player encounters Tonka vehicles that can be repaired with Tonka Cool Tools, preparing them for later use. Once the vehicles are ready, the player may complete training at the academy or proceed directly into missions set across three locations: the Docks, the Zoo, and various Flood missions. Missions require operating different vehicles—including helicopters, fire engines, bulldozers, and rescue boats—to accomplish objectives. A print center is also available, allowing the player to print stickers, awards, and a full play set.

== Development ==
Tonka Search & Rescue was developed by Media Station, a company founded in 1989 and based in Ann Arbor, Michigan. It was released in October 1997.

== Reception ==
Reception

Review score
Publication	Score
Quad-City Times	4/4

Working Mother deemed the "appealing" game one of the best of 1997. Tampa Bay Times said to skip Tonka Search & Rescue.

The Canadian Toy Testing Council gave Tonka Search & Rescue a not recommended rating on a scale of three stars, two stars, one star, novelty, not recommended.

Tonka Search & Rescue ranked 12th on PC Data's list of Top-Selling PC Games for November 1997.

Tonka Search & Rescue received a 1997 DICE Award nomination for Computer Family/Kids Title of the Year.
