= Steel Monsters =

Former toy brand

Steel Monsters were a toy series from the Tonka company in the 1980s

Produced in 1986 and 1987 by Tonka, they were well-made and colorful 3-3/4" figures, each having its own mini-comic. Sub-labeled as "The Only Survivors", they were very reminiscent of the Mad Max genre, with Mad Max Beyond Thunderdome coming out the year before.

1986 line

- The Blaster vehicle included Talon (Marauder leader)
- The Bomber vehicle included Punk (Marauder)
- The Destroyer vehicle included Half Track (Survivor)
- The Enforcer vehicle included Wheel Boss (Survivor leader)
- The Masher vehicle included Metal Face (Marauder)

1987 line

- The unproduced Pulverizor vehicle included Tygress (Survivor)
- The unproduced Wrecker vehicle included Viking (Survivor)
- The unproduced Barbarian vehicle included Retread (Marauder)

Individual carded figures came with a mini-comic book to introduce the character. They were broken down into good/bad guy teams, the Survivors (the good guys - their vehicles were tan-colored) and the Marauders (the bad guys - their vehicles were black).
