= The New Adventures of Zorro (1997 TV series) =

Animated television series

- Genre: Science fantasy; Western
- Written by: Doug Molitor; Jeffrey Scott; David Wise
- Directed by: Gary Blatchford; Neal Warner
- Voices of: Michael Gough; Jeannie Elias; Earl Boen; Tony Pope; Pat Fraley
- Theme music composer: Dennis C. Brown; Maxine Sellers
- Composers: Dennis C. Brown; Peter Meisner; Gernot Wolfgang
- Countries of origin: United States; Ireland
- Original language: English
- No. of seasons: 2
- No. of episodes: 26

Production
- Executive producers: Fred Wolf; Craig Hemmings; Dan Maddicot
- Producers: Eamonn Lawless; John Gertz
- Production companies: Warner Bros. International Television Production; Fred Wolf Films Dublin; Zorro Productions, Inc. Carrington Productions International; Harvest Entertainment

Original release
- Network: Syndication
- Release: September 20, 1997 – December 12, 1998

The New Adventures of Zorro is the third animated television series to feature the character of Zorro. The show aired for two seasons in weekly syndication, from September 20, 1997 to December 12, 1998.

== Plot ==
The show starred Michael Gough as Zorro/Diego de la Vega, with Earl Boen as Captain Montecero, the lead villain. Patrick Fraley played Diego's father, Don Alejandro de la Vega, and Tony Pope was the bumbling Sergeant Garcia, who was popularized by Henry Calvin on the 1950s Disney live-action series. This series added elements of science fiction and fantasy to the Zorro legend, with the hero battling supervillains who used steampunk gadgets and magic. Zorro employed similar equipment designed by his mute manservant, Bernardo, and was aided by the magic of the Native American wise woman, Grey Owl.

== Cast ==
- Michael Gough as Don Diego de la Vega / Zorro
- Jeannie Elias as Isabella Torres, Grey Owl, Little Squirrel
- Earl Boen as Captain Montecero
- Tony Pope as Sergeant Garcia
- Patrick Fraley as Don Alejandro de la Vega

=== Additional voices ===
- Ed Asner
- Dee Bradley Baker
- Mary Kay Bergman
- Susan Blu
- Victor Brandt
- Clancy Brown
- Warren Burton
- Hamilton Camp
- Brian Cummings
- Daniel Davis
- Ronald Feinberg
- Ed Gilbert
- Jennifer Hale
- Mark Hamill
- Jess Harnell as The Enforcer
- Sherman Howard
- Alan Oppenheimer
- Ron Perlman as Gomez Rudolfo
- Mark Rolston
- Rino Romano
- Neil Ross
- Kevin Schon
- Glenn Shadix
- Fred Wolf

== Crew ==
- Susan Blu - Voice Director

== Episodes ==
=== Season 1 (1997) ===
No.	Title	Original release date
1	"To Catch a Fox"	September 20, 1997
Zorro is caught in the middle when he must prevent the corrupt Montecero from using pilfered blasting powder, while Isabella sets out to learn the masked vigilante's true identity.
2	"Sting of the Serpent God"	September 27, 1997
Zorro must prevent Montecero from stealing gold belonging to Mayans.
3	"Night of the Tolchen"	October 4, 1997
Sergeant Garcia and his men accidentally release the Tolchen when they take his totem.
4	"The Beast Within"	October 11, 1997
Zorro must save Grey Owl’s grandson, Little Squirrel, from a curse that has turned him into a monster.
5	"The Enforcer"	October 18, 1997
Montecero hires a cyborg hit man to kill Zorro.
6	"Two Zorros Are Better than One"	October 25, 1997
7	"Tar Pit Terror"	November 1, 1997
8	"A King's Ransom"	November 8, 1997
Don Alejandro is kidnapped by a masked man, who is revealed to be a renegade soldier he once stopped from overthrowing the king of Spain.
9	"The Pirates of San Pedro"	November 15, 1997
10	"The Anti Zorro"	November 22, 1997
Kidnapping an elderly Native American man, Montecero forces his captive to use his magic to create an evil duplicate of Zorro.
11	"Valley of the Manbeast"	November 29, 1997
12	"The Revenge of the Panther"	December 6, 1997
13	"The Iron Man"	December 12, 1997

=== Season 2 (1998) ===
No. overall	No. in season	Title	Original release date
14	1	"The Samurai and the Sorcerer"	September 19, 1998
15	2	"The Poison Pen"	September 26, 1998
16	3	"Vision of Darkness"	October 3, 1998
In the vein of It's a Wonderful Life, Zorro is shown what life would be like without him if he had never taken his chosen path.
17	4	"The Case of the Masked Marauder"	October 10, 1998
An English detective decides to solve the mystery of Zorro's true identity.
18	5	"Return of the Conquistadors"	October 17, 1998
19	6	"The Hunter"	October 24, 1998
A hunter decides to make Zorro his next quarry.
20	7	"The Raiding Party"	October 31, 1998
21	8	"The Four Horsemen"	November 7, 1998
The Enforcer returns and takes the governor of California hostage.
22	9	"The Nightmare Express"	November 14, 1998
The first railroad in El Pueblo has been completed, but someone is trying to destroy the train.
23	10	"The Ice Monster Cometh"	November 21, 1998
24	11	"The Secret of El Zorro"	November 28, 1998
When Don Alejandro is bitten by a rattlesnake, Diego recaps the events that led to him becoming Zorro as his father lies in a coma.
25	12	"The Nordic Quest"	December 5, 1998
26	13	"Adios, Mi Capitan"	December 12, 1998

== Home media ==
The show's first ten episodes were released on VHS in 1998 by Warner Home Video. Six episodes were released on DVD in 2004 by Warner Home Video and were re-released in 2010.
