= Tonka Workshop Playset =

- Developer: Media Station
- Platforms: Windows; Macintosh
- Release: November 1998
- Genre: Sandbox

Tonka Workshop Playset, also known as Tonka Workshop CD-ROM Playset, is 1998 sandbox video game developed by Media Station and published by Hasbro Interactive on CD-ROM. It is for ages 3 and up.

== Summary ==
Tonka Workshop Playset lets players choose from a barn, cellar, storage shed, tree house or pickup truck, each filled with a batch of activities. These include repairing a bicycle, a hole in a bridge to repair, as well as others.

== Development ==
Tonka Workshop Playset was developed by Media Station, a company founded in 1989 and base din Ann Arbor, Michigan.

== Reception ==
Kids Domain enjoyed with Tonka Workshop Playset despite the technical problems. Birmingham Post-Herald called Tonka Workshop Playset a fun and great looking product. The Canadian Toy Testing Council gave Tonka Workshop Playset three stars on a scale of three stars, two stars, one star, novelty, not recommended.

Tonka Workshop Playset ranked 7th on PC Data's list of Top-Selling Games during its debut week of November 4 to 8 in 1998. In November 1998, it ranked 16th overall, according to PC Data.
