= Tonka Raceway =

1999 video game

- Developers: Media Station (Windows); Morning Star Multimedia (GBC)
- Publisher: Hasbro Interactive
- Platforms: Windows; Game Boy Color
- Release: November 1999 (Game Boy Color)

Tonka Raceway is a 1999 video game developed by Media Station and published by Hasbro Interactive. The game is for ages 5 and up.

== Gameplay ==
In Tonka Raceway, players are welcomed by Tonka Joe, who introduces the game world of racing and customization. The game begins with a choice among 37 whimsical vehicles, ranging from dump trucks to alienmobiles, each ready to drive on a variety of tracks. Players can race against the clock, Team Tonka, or a friend in multiplayer mode. Victories yield prize money, which can be spent on performance upgrades like engines and tires. For those inclined toward creativity, a simple track editor allows players to design their own raceways. The game also supports importing custom vehicles from Tonka Garage.

== Development ==
The game was developed by Media Station, a company founded in 1989.

== Reception ==
Reception

Review scores
Publication	Score
All Game Guide	1.5/5
Computer Games Magazine	4.5/5
GameSpot	4.9/10
IGN	5/10
The Sydney Morning Herald	3/5

Computer Games Magazine said "All told, Tonka Raceway delivers many fun filled hours for kids, and could very well be the cheapest baby sitter you've ever hired".

GameSpot said "All in all, Tonka Raceway is a fun, albeit light racer. Everything moves at decent tempo, and the rumble effects are solid. If R/C Pro-Am didn't exist, this game would probably be taken a bit more seriously. As is, Tonka Raceway is just a light rehash of a more solid title, perhaps aimed at a younger, less demanding audience".

Kids Domain said "While Tonka Raceway may not be as speedy as other kid racers like Hot Wheels' Interactive Stunt Track Driver, it does improve longevity by offering features the others don't".

The game ranked 10th on PC Data's list of Top-Selling Games Software for the week of April 4 to 10 in 1999.

The Canadian Toy Testing Council gave Tonka Raceway three stars on a scale of three stars, two stars, one star, novelty, not recommended.
