= Saint-Usuge Spaniel =

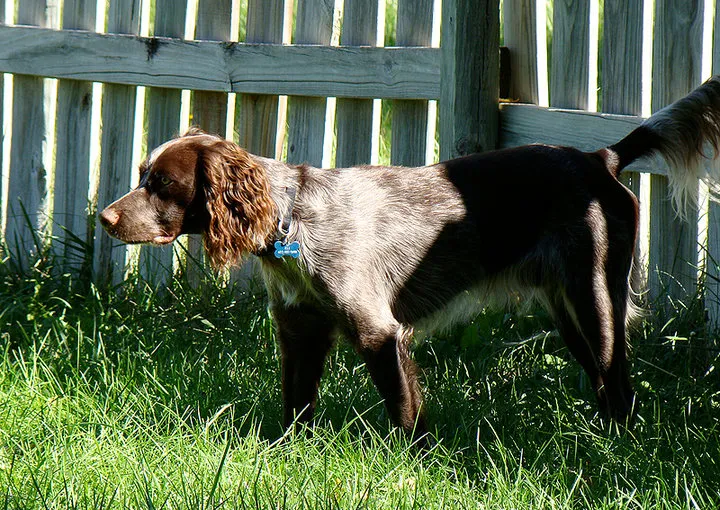
- An Épagneul de Saint-Usuge (Saint-Usuge Spaniel)
- Other names: St-Usuge Spaniel; Epagneul de Saint-Usuge
- Origin: France
Kennel club standards
- Société Centrale Canine: standard

The Saint-Usuge Spaniel (or Épagneul de Saint-Usuge) is a breed of Spaniel originating in the Bresse region of France. The breed has origins dating back to at least the 16th century, but was nearly extinct by the end of World War II. Through the efforts of Father Robert Billard (1912–2000), the breed was resurrected during the second half of the 20th century; its national breed club was founded in 1990. The breed was recognised by the Société Centrale Canine (French Kennel Club) in 2003.

== History ==
The history of this breed can be traced to the 16th century, however by the mid 20th century it had nearly become extinct. Robert Billard had been appointed curé of Savigny-en-Revermont, a small commune in Saône-et-Loire on the edge of the Bresse region of France, in 1939. Billard was taken as a prisoner of war during World War II from 1939 to 1945. Following his return, Billard was an active hunter and began to search for a suitable hunting dog. He was told of a local dog breed known as the "Epagneul de Saint-Usuge", and contacted the Société Centrale Canine in order to find what happened to the breed.

Father Billard found that the last recording of the Saint-Usuge Spaniel was in a dog show in 1936 in the nearby town of Louhans, and he located the breed standard from that show. He proceeded to visit the hunters in his parish until he found a dog which matched the breed description, a female named Poupette.

In 1950 he found a male spaniel named Dick, who was a son of Braco, the dog which won best in show at the show in 1936. He continued to find other male dogs around the region to include in the reconstruction of the breed. In 1962, a Small Münsterländer female named Bianca von der Rumerburg was used in the breeding programme, chosen as that breed's standards mostly closely resemble the Saint-Usuge's. In 1980, the work on reconstructing the breed was handed over to Serge Bey, a local conservationist. Father Billard's breeding programme bred nearly 250 dogs over a 33-year period, with each puppy's hunting qualities and behavioral traits recorded in his handwritten cahier d'élevage (breeding notebook).

In 1989, the first informal gathering of Saint-Usuge owners was held in Mervans, which Billard attended; this gathering led directly to the founding of the breed club the following year. The national breed club for France was set up in 1990 and known as the Club de l'Epagneul de Saint-Usuge. The Société Centrale Canine recognised the Saint Usuge Spaniel on January 8, 2003, placing it within Group 7 with other continental spaniels. While the breed is not fully recognised by the American Kennel Club, it is listed as a breed in the club's companion animal recovery scheme. It is also not yet recognised by the Fédération Cynologique Internationale, although a recognition dossier is in progress. More than 1,200 dogs have been bred since the Club's founding in 1990, with secondary populations in Germany, Switzerland, Austria, Canada, and the United States.

== Description ==
It is a small French pointing breed, measuring 16–21 inches (41–53 cm) at the withers according to the breed standard. They have a typical spaniel appearance, with ears that are located below the eyeline that have fringes long enough to reach the tip of the nose. The body should be well muscled with a broad, deep chest. The only color that the coat comes in is brown, but it may have white markings including a white "star" on the forehead, which some dogs can lose as their adult coat grows in. In addition to the ears; the tail, shoulders and chest should also be fringed with fur. The tail of the Saint Usuge is never docked, and should be long and curved.

=== Temperament ===
Described by its French breed club as easy to train, it is an obedient, passionate and affectionate breed. In the field it is suited to a variety of terrains, including swamps, water and thickets; quarry that the breed specialises in includes waterfowl and woodcock.

== See also ==
- List of dog breeds
