= Tonka Garage =

1998 video game

- Developer: Media Station
- Publisher: Hasbro Interactive
- Platform: Windows
- Release: April 1998
- Genre: Creation sim

Tonka Garage is a 1998 video game developed by Media Station and published by Hasbro Interactive. It is based on Tonka's toy franchise products.

== Gameplay ==
The gameplay in Tonka Garage is organized around seven distinct areas of a working garage, each offering a different activity for the child to perform. In the Design Shop, the player assembles a custom vehicle by choosing parts and configuring the machine. The Office provides explanations and guidance about the garage environment and its tools. The Repair Shop presents vehicles that need fixing; the child selects tools such as wrenches, a mallet, or a welder and follows spoken instructions from Sparks, the mechanic, to complete each task. In the Paint Shop, the player applies colors and decals to the vehicle's exterior. At the Gas Station, Chad assists with refueling. On the Test Track, the child can either drive the vehicle around the course or run a crash test. In the Junkyard, old cars can be crushed, blown up, or melted down to create new parts. Throughout these areas, Tonka characters offer direction, and the player can also create items such as trading cards, decals, ID badges, award certificates, and custom Tonka characters.

== Development ==
Tonka Garage was developed by Media Station, a company founded in 1989 and based in Ann Arbor, Michigan. It was released in April 1998.

== Reception ==
Reception

Review score
Publication	Score
The Houston Chronicle	A

The Houston Chronicle called Tonka Garage a great place to play at working. The Canadian Toy Testing Council gave Tonka Garage two stars on a scale of three stars, two stars, one star, novelty, not recommended.

Tonka Garage was the number one best selling educational game in May 1998, according to NPD.
