= Pound Puppies (film) =

- VHS cover
- Genre: Adventure; Comedy
- Based on: Pound Puppies by Tonka
- Written by: Tom Ruegger
- Directed by: Alan Zaslove
- Voices of: Dan Gilvezan; Ron Palillo; Alan Oppenheimer; Gail Matthius; Don Messick; Adrienne Alexander; Frank Welker; Joanne Worley
- Composer: Hoyt Curtin
- Country of origin: United States
- Original language: English

Production
- Executive producers: William Hanna; Joseph Barbera; Patrick S. Feely (for Tonka Corporation)
- Producers: Mitch Schauer; Lois Hanrahan (for Tonka Corporation)
- Editor: Gil Iverson
- Running time: 36 min.
- Production companies: Hanna-Barbera Productions; Tonka Corporation

Original release
- Network: Syndication
- Release: October 26, 1985

Pound Puppies is an animated television special, produced by Hanna-Barbera Productions, based on the popular toyline from Tonka, which aired in syndication on October 26, 1985, paired with Star Fairies. The story is a spoof of the 1963 film The Great Escape.

Characters in the special included the Fonzie-styled leader Cooler (voiced by Dan Gilvezan), the cheerleader Bright Eyes (voiced by Adrienne Alexander), a dog with a very nasal like New York accent known only as "The Nose" (voiced by Joanne Worley), and the goofy inventor aptly named Howler (voiced by Frank Welker), who can only howl.

== Plot ==
A female dog from a wealthy aristocratic family named Violet Vanderfeller is being pursued by dognappers when she is picked up and taken to the city pound. There, she meets the gang and discovers their mission to find homes for themselves. The film plot centers on Violet (whom Cooler insists on referring to as "Sam") attempting to reunite with her family, ultimately succeeding. Two other dogs appeared in the special. They were the upper-class snob Barkerville and the garbage-can-digging Scrounger.

== Voice cast ==
- Dan Gilvezan – Cooler
- Ron Palillo – Scrounger
- Alan Oppenheimer – Barkerville
- Gail Matthius – Violet
- Don Messick – Louie, Itchy
- Adrienne Alexander – Bright Eyes
- Frank Welker – Howler, Catgut, Snichey
- Joanne Worley – Nose
- Charles Adler – Flack
- Avery Schreiber – Tubbs
- Sorrell Booke – The Mayor
- Garrett Morris – The Chief
- Jonathan Winters – Bigelow
- Ed Begley Jr. – Arnold
- Henry Gibson – Nabbit
- Victoria Carroll – The Doc
- June Foray – Mother Superior
- Laura Duff - Additional Voice

== Home media ==
The special was released on VHS in 1986 by Family Home Entertainment and is available on a DVD which came with certain Pound Puppies toys.
