= Media Station (American company) =

American video game developer

Media Station, Inc.
- Animated version of the Media Station logo
- Type: Private
- Founded: May 18, 1989
- Founder: David Gregory
- Headquarters: Ann Arbor, Michigan, United States
- Key people: Jim Maslyn (CEO and President)
- Website: www.mediastation.com

Media Station, Inc. was a video game developer based in Ann Arbor, Michigan. It had an business development office in San Francisco. Media Station formed partnerships with Microsoft, Philips Interactive Media, Disney, and others. In addition to video games, Media Station was known for its SelectPlay service, and the MediaRemote System.

== History ==
In 1994, Media Station had sales of about $1 million.

In 1995, Media Station released Puzzle Castle, based on the Usborne Puzzle Adventure series. Earlier in February, Aaron Howard was appointed as president and chief executive officer.

By June 1995, Media Station employed 50 people.

In June 1996, Media Station laid off 33 of its 118 workers.

In Summur 1999, Media Station launched its MediaRemote System in 40 U.S. cities. Later in November, Media Station launched its SelectPlay service. 75 titles were available on SelectPlay.

In December 1999, Motorola made an equity investment in Media Station.

A bankruptcy filing for the Michigan-based company was made in a Michigan court on February 28, 2002. The case was finally closed over six years later in November 20, 2008. The company itself was dissolved on July 15, 2004.

== Games ==
Year	Title	Platform(s)	Ref.
1994	Disney's Animated Storybook: The Lion King	Windows, Macintosh	
1996	Magic Fairy Tales: Barbie as Rapunzel	Windows, Macintosh	
1997	Tonka Search & Rescue	Windows, Macintosh	
1998	Tonka Workshop Playset	Windows, Macintosh	
1998	Extreme Tactics	Windows	
1998	Tonka Garage	Windows	
1999	Stuart Little: Big City Adventures	Windows	
1999	Tonka Raceway	Windows	
