= Funrise Toys =

American toy manufacturer and distributor

Funrise Inc.
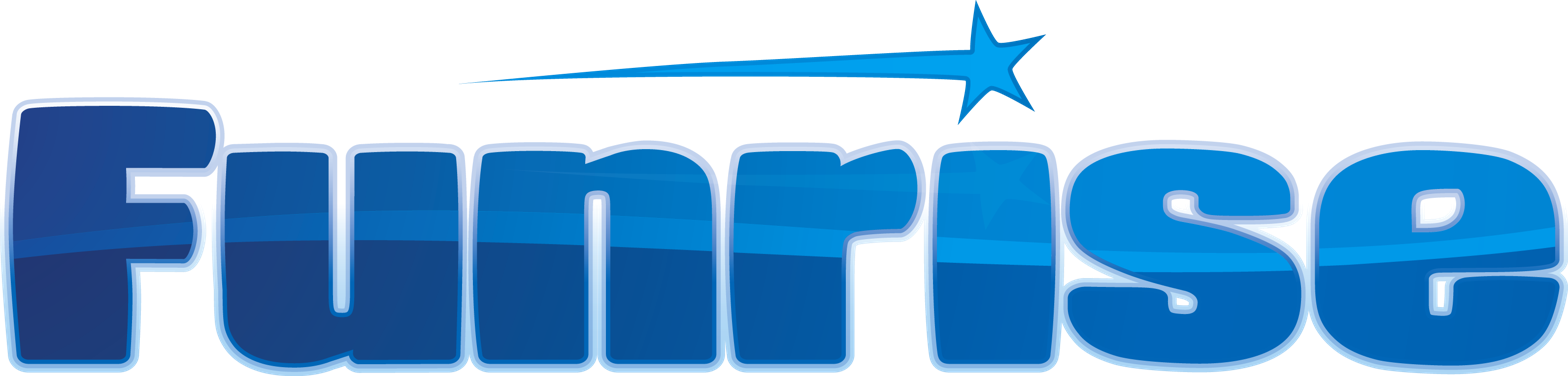
- Type: Subsidiary
- Industry: Toys and Entertainment
- Founded: 1987; 39 years ago
- Headquarters: California, United States
- Key people: Shirley Price; King Cheng; Martin J. Good
- Products: Gazillion Bubbles; Wonder Park; Rainbow Butterfly Unicorn Kitty; Herodrive; Sunny Bunnies; Best Fairy Friends; Fart Ninjas
- Parent: Matrix Holdings Limited
- Website: funrise.com

Funrise Inc. is an American toy manufacturer.

== History ==
Funrise Toy Corporation designs, manufactures, and distributes toys for children. The company offers a line of preschool toys, as well as toys for kids of various age groups. It serves customers through its showrooms. The company was founded in 1987 and is based in Van Nuys, California with additional offices and showrooms in Bentonville, Arkansas; Minneapolis, Minnesota; Ontario, California; Kowloon, Hong Kong; Buckinghamshire, United Kingdom; and Nuremberg, Germany, as well as Australia. As of June 8, 2007, Funrise Toy Corp. is a subsidiary of Matrix Holdings Ltd.

== Products ==
=== Current toys and games ===
- Gazillion Bubbles
- Bright Fairy Friends
- Rainbow Butterfly Unicorn Kitty
- Gla'more
- Mighty Fleet
- Cat (partnered with Caterpillar Inc.)
- Fart Ninjas

=== Former distributed toys and games ===
- Tonka (partnered with Hasbro and Basic FUN)
- Herodrive (partnered with DC, Warner Bros. and Marvel Comics)
- Sunny Bunnies
- Wonder Park (partnered with Paramount Pictures)
- Luna Petunia

== Rainbow Butterfly Unicorn Kitty ==
Funrise's entertainment division serves as the producer for the Rainbow Butterfly Unicorn Kitty television series, which aired on Nickelodeon and Nicktoons in 2019. The series is animated by Bardel Entertainment.
