= Pound Puppies =

Toyline

- Type: Stuffed toys
- Invented by: Michael Bowling
- Company: Tonka (1984–1991); Hasbro (1991–present); Playmates Toys (1994); Galoob (1996); Jakks Pacific (2000–2003); Funrise Toys (2014); Basic Fun (2019–present)
- Country: United States
- Availability: 1984–present

Pound Puppies is a toyline that was created by Tonka in the 1980s. It later inspired an animated TV special, two animated TV series, and a feature film. Shipments of the toys over five years generated sales of $300 million in 35 countries. The brand generated more than $1 billion in retail sales by 2002.

== Toy description ==
The puppies were a variety of plush stuffed dog dolls with floppy ears and droopy eyes. They came in a variety of colors (gray, brown, white), some with spots. Each one came in a cardboard case shaped like a doghouse with an "adoption" certificate. The tagline was "Loveable Huggable". Smaller versions were also created (approximately 5 inches (13 cm) long), and a line of cats called Pound Pur-r-ries was also released. Each authentic toy puppy had a heart-shaped or a bone (on the first edition puppies) emblem near its tail that sported a "PP" logo with either a dog (Puppies) or cat (Purries) peeking above it. The toys are cuddly dogs.

== Toy history ==
=== North America ===
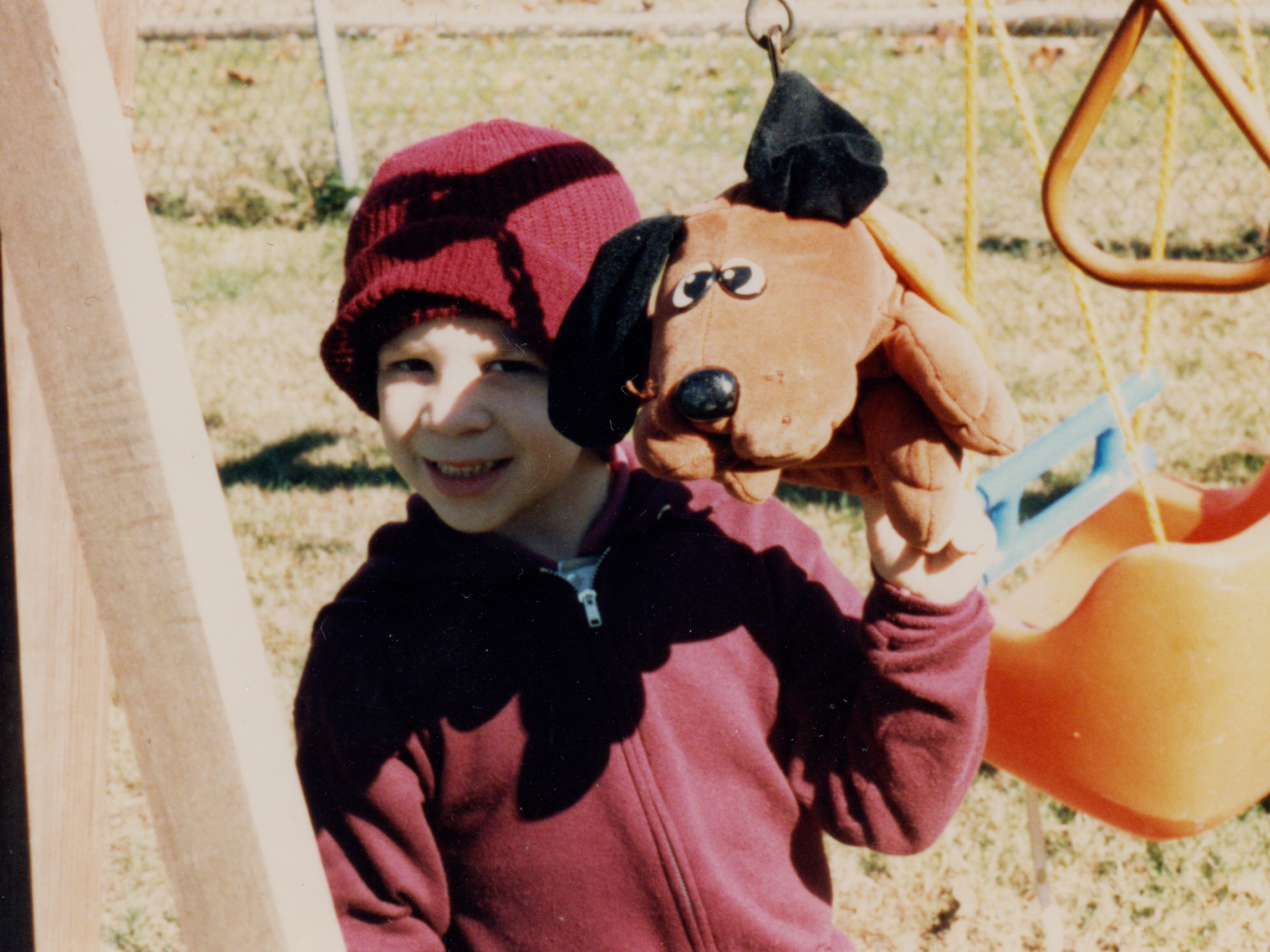
A child holds up a Pound Puppies toy

The toys were created by Mike Bowling in 1984. The first puppies were sold by Irwin Toy in Toronto, Canada. After Irwin, the line was produced by Tonka which introduced them to the U.S. market.

By 1985, Tonka brought Pound Puppies to the United States, and more than 2.5 million puppies were adopted that year.

In 1987, Hardee's and Pizza Hut restaurants also offered a series of Pound Puppies with their Children's Meals. Other products besides stuffed toys were made such as Little Golden Books, coloring books and miniature figurines.

Pound Puppies continued to be popular in the early 1990s. The toys were produced again in the early 2000s by Jakks Pacific and included specific breeds of dog (as opposed to a generic model), along with barking sounds and movements. The toyline was discontinued in 2003.

In 2014, Funrise Toys launched a new Pound Puppies toyline, under license from Hasbro. In 2019, the brand was reintroduced again by Basic Fun, featuring normal sizes and baby sizes. They previously sold jumbo sizes as well. This time, the stuffed animals contain a little slip that kids can bring to pounds and animal shelters to receive free puppies.

=== Other regions ===
In South America, in the 1980s, the toys went by the name Snif Snif (an onomatopoeic brand). Makers under license included Brazil's Estrela, Argentina's Antex, and Peru's BASA.

In France, they were known as Les Pitous (individual dolls going simply by the singular Pitou). The toys were made by Vulli under license.

In Germany, they were known as Wauzi (Pound Purries were also sold as Miauzi).

In Italy, they were known as Cercafamiglia, and were made by Harbert.

In the United Kingdom, Pound Puppies was distributed by Hornby Hobbies. In 2012, Hasbro launched a toyline, inspired by the 2010 TV series of the same name, which was exclusive to the UK market.

In Spain, it was marketed by Panava under the name "Triston" (Sad). In this version, the character "Triston" (who played Cooler in the TV series) is a dog abandoned by his owner looking for a home. The line also featured "Laly", Triston's girlfriend (who played Violet). Later, in the 1990s, it was marketed under the original lines, but distributed by Ideal.

== TV special ==
A TV special based on the toyline was released in October 1985 by Hanna-Barbera. It ran in syndication, paired with Star Fairies. In the special, a female dog named Violet Vanderfeller is dognapped and ends up at the city pound. The Pound Puppies attempt to and end up succeeding in reuniting Violet with her family. The special was released in 1986 on VHS by Family Home Entertainment and is also available on DVD, which came with certain Pound Puppies toys.

== TV series ==
=== 1986 TV series ===
After the TV special became successful, Hanna-Barbera gained the rights to create an animated TV series, which was broadcast on ABC from September 1986 to February 1989. While the series was loosely based on the special, it made no mention of the character Violet. The Pound Puppies who were featured also underwent re-designs from the TV special. When the program was renewed for a second season, there were major style differences and the series was retitled All New Pound Puppies.

=== 2010 TV series ===
Another television series, this time produced for Hasbro Studios, premiered on the Hub Network (now Discovery Family; partly owned by Hasbro since its launch) in 2010. The characters are based on the version of the Puppies which Hasbro released in the summer of 2012. In addition, there was an online website where one could download a Pound Puppies adoption certificate. In 2012, Pound Puppies was one of four original animated series from The Hub to win the CINE Golden Eagle Award for its high quality production and storytelling. Season one episode "I Never Barked for My Father" was awarded the Humanitas Prize for excellence in writing for children's television animation.

== Feature film ==
In 1988, TriStar Pictures released a Pound Puppies film titled Pound Puppies and the Legend of Big Paw. It was produced by Atlantic Releasing, Carolco Pictures, Family Home Entertainment and Kushner-Locke with The Maltese Companies.

It was the only animated film to be released by Carolco Pictures, as well as the first animated film to be released by TriStar Pictures.

It was panned by critics, and poorly received at the box office. Shoddy animation, character inconsistencies and a color palette that differed from the show's were among the chief complaints.

Fans were also confused by the apparent romantic pairing of Nose Marie and Cooler, which contradicted events that had taken place in the first season of the series. In addition, the plot is set in the 1950s with the story being narrated by Whopper, who in the present day is an older dog who tells the story to his nephew and niece.

== See also ==
- List of Pound Puppies characters
