= Tonka Construction =

- Developer: Vortex Media Arts
- Publisher: Hasbro Interactive
- Series: Tonka
- Platforms: Windows; Macintosh
- Release: February 1996
- Genre: Simulation
- Mode: Single player

Tonka Construction is a 1996 video game developed by Santa Monica, California-based studio Vortex Media Arts and published by Hasbro Interactive. It is for ages 4 to 8.

== Gameplay ==
In Tonka Construction, the player selects areas on a map to operate Tonka vehicles through tasks such as repairing machines, constructing buildings, clearing roads, removing snow, and collecting gold, with each completed activity awarding a certificate.

== Reception ==
Reception

Review scores
Publication	Score
All Game Guide	4/5
The Houston Chronicle	A

All Game Guide called Tonka Construction a decent look into the world of construction. The Birmingham News liked the animations but disliked the lack of difficulty levels in Tonka Construction. The Canadian Toy Testing Council gave Tonka Construction three stars on a scale of three stars, two stars, one star, novelty, not recommended.

Tonka Construction 2 ranked 16th on PC Data's list of Top-Selling PC Games for 1997.
