= Dan Gilvezan =

American actor (born 1950)

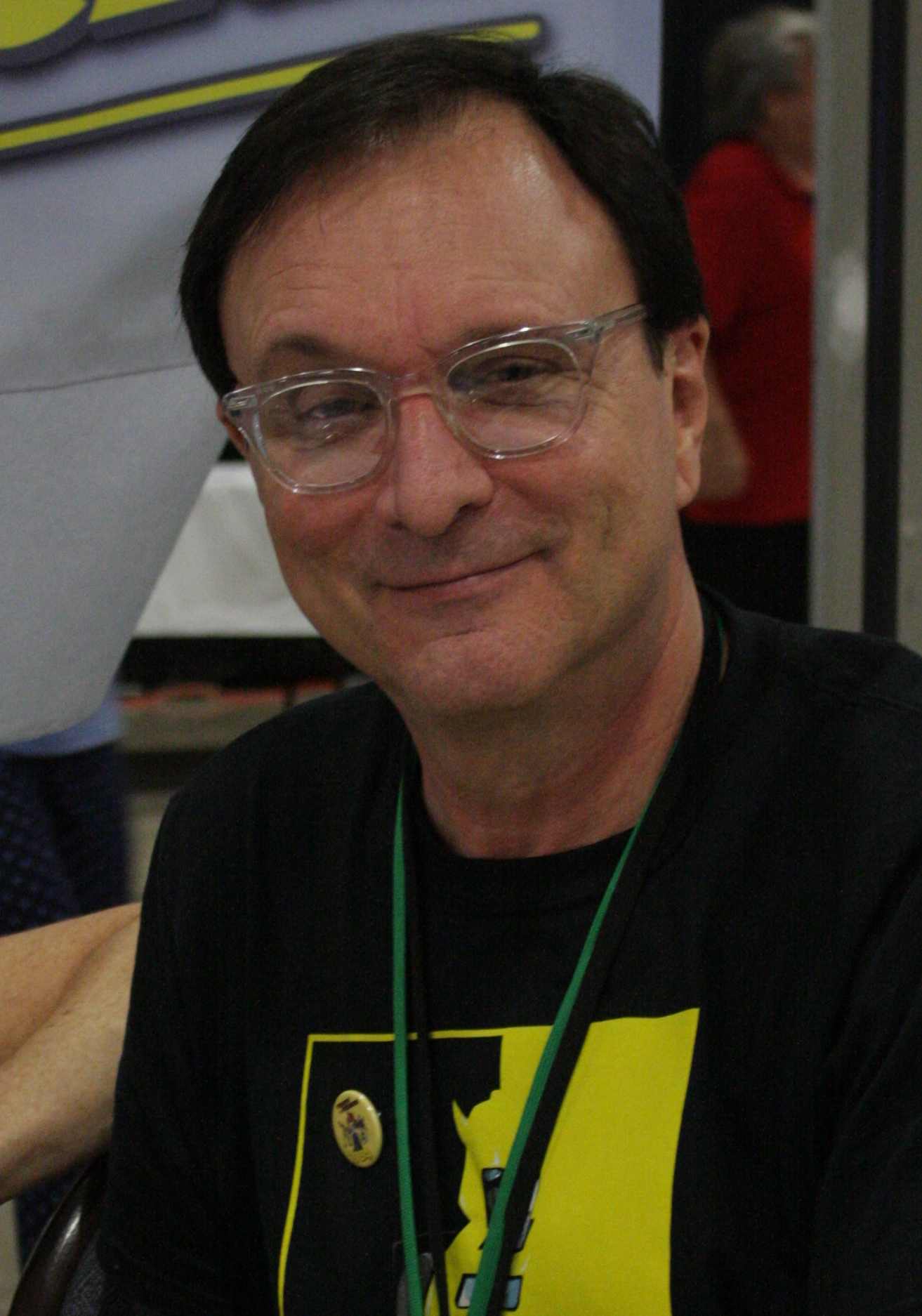
- Gilvezan at the 2013 Florida Supercon
- Born: Daniel John Gilvezan; October 26, 1950 (age 75); St. Louis, Missouri, U.S.
- Education: Webster University (BA); The Catholic University of America (MA)
- Occupation: Actor
- Years active: 1975–present
- Agent: DPN
- Children: 1

Daniel John Gilvezan (born October 26, 1950) is an American actor, known for playing Peter Parker / Spider-Man in the 1981 animated series Spider-Man and His Amazing Friends and Bumblebee in the original 1984-1987 The Transformers series.

== Early life and career ==
Gilvezan was born in St. Louis, Missouri. He graduated from Webster University with a B.A. in drama and later earned a master's degree from The Catholic University of America. Soon afterwards he began touring with the National Players company in Washington D.C. From the mid-to-late 1970s, he appeared in plays in summer stock, dinner theater, and children's theater. In 1973 Gilvezan performed in Wayside Theatre's touring group along with Kathy Bates.

In 1980, while doing an on-camera commercial he met an agent from The Tisherman agency and signed on with them. His first voice-over role was as Spider-Man in Spider-Man and His Amazing Friends, which continued for three seasons.

In 1984, he voiced Bumblebee on Transformers. According to an interview in the Transformers Collectors Club magazine, Gilvezan auditioned for both the part of Spike Witwicky and the part of Bumblebee in The Transformers, but was only given the role of Bumblebee because the producers did not want the two characters to be played by the same person. Dan Gilvezan also voiced Outback, Hot Spot and Snapdragon on the show and reprised Bumblebee in the 1986 feature film The Transformers: The Movie.

Gilvezan also worked on Jem, providing a few guest roles on various episodes, though he did play (with a British accent) a recurring character called Sean Harrison, one of Kimber's many crushes, who almost proposed to her at the end of the second season.

Later, he voiced Slip Stream on G.I. Joe, Brick Bradley/Bugman on Teenage Mutant Ninja Turtles for two episodes, as well as Dirk Courage in Spiral Zone. Gilvezan also played Cooler in Hanna-Barbera's Pound Puppies TV series, Questar on Dino-Riders, Rolf in The Legend of Prince Valiant and Henry Mitchell and Ruff the Dog on the short-lived The All-New Dennis the Menace series.

Gilvezan returned to the Spider-Man Universe to lend his voice to Miguel O'Hara/Spider-Man 2099 in Spider-Man: Shattered Dimensions. In an interview with 2D-X.com, he stated "After a 25 year hiatus, I feel I finally have a grasp of the character. Seriously, the whole experience has been a delight." Gilvezan later reprised his role as Bumblebee in the video game Transformers: Devastation.

Gilvezan voiced Pat Dugan in the direct-to-video film Justice League: Gods and Monsters.

Gilvezan is also a published author, having written books such as Drowned in the Grenadine, a fictional story of a failed actor seeking to make a comeback, and Bumblebee and Me: Life as a G1 Transformer, an autobiographical recollection of his work on the original Transformers animated series and its effect on his life and career.

== Television guest starring roles ==
He has also guest starred on many television shows, including The Bernie Mac Show, NYPD Blue, Sabrina, the Teenage Witch, Family Ties, ALF, thirtysomething, Punky Brewster, Archie Bunker's Place, Newhart, Who's the Boss?, Moonlighting, Normal, Ohio, Perfect Strangers, Sisters, 3rd Rock from the Sun, Step by Step, Evening Shade, Alice, Bette, Bones and Boston Legal.

Gilvezan played a reporter on two episodes of Hill Street Blues, appeared as Kent Beudine on several episodes of Diagnosis Murder and starred as Skip Seville on She-Wolf of London. Between 1981 and 1988, he appeared in commercials as the spokesperson for Jack in the Box restaurants, attempting to compare their menu items to those of McDonald's and other fast-food chains, to no avail; hence the slogan of "There's No Comparison" was used at the time.

Preceded by Ted Schwartz	Voice or portrayal of Spider-Man; 1982-1983	Succeeded by Christopher Daniel Barnes
Preceded by None	Voice of Bumblebee; 1984-1986	Succeeded by Mark Ryan
