= Tonka Digs N Rigs =

Tonka Dig’n Rigs
- Developer: ImageBuilder Software
- Platform: Windows
- Release: September 2000
- Genre: Educational

Tonka Dig’n Rigs, also known as Tonka Dig’n Rigs CD-ROM Playset, is a 2000 educational software developed by ImageBuilder Software and published by Hasbro Interactive.

== Summary ==
Tonka Dig’n Rigs allows users to turn their computer into a dashboard and drive six construction vehicles. Activities include construction jobs at various locations.

== Development ==
Tonka Dig’n Rigs was developed by ImageBuilder Software, a company founded in 1983.

== Reception ==
The Idaho Statesman called Tonka Dig’n Rigs a ton of fun for truck drivers. Newsday liked the driving component of Tonka Dig’n Rigs.

Tonka Dig’n Rigs was a finalist at the 2000 D.I.C.E. Awards for best PC Family Title of the Year.
