= Canadian Toy Testing Council =

Canadian not-for-profit organization

- Abbreviation: CTTC
- Established: 1952; 74 years ago
- Founded at: Ottawa
- Defunct: June 2015; 11 years ago
- Type: Nonprofit
- Purpose: Game and toy testing
- Headquarters: Nepean, Ontario, Canada

The Canadian Toy Testing Council was a volunteer-operated not-for-profit organization established in 1952 to test toys for playability and safety. The organization ceased operations in June 2015.

== History ==
Each year, the organization solicited families from the Ottawa–Gatineau region to volunteer for its testing program, which reviewed hundreds of games and toys made available to the Canadian market that year, as well as books authored by Canadian writers. Parents of participating families were required to pay a membership fee and attend a training session. There was often a waiting list of families that wanted to participate in the toy testing program. Children, infants to 16 years of age, from about 300 families would play with up to 25 games for 6 to 12 weeks, providing feedback to the organization on the game's assembly, design, durability, function, play value, and safety. Each game or toy was given to six families for testing. Each tested game received a rating from a low of 1 star to a high of 3 stars.

The games and toys receiving the highest scores from the children would then be selected by the council's Evaluation Committee for final review. Others received a "not recommended" rating, and those that posed safety risks such as choking hazards were "red flagged". It also reported toys with such safety risks to Health Canada.

Every November, it published its annual Toy Report based on these reviews, and also announced the "Children's Choice Award" and "Best Bet" recommendations. The report included a recommended age range for each tested toy, sometimes differing from the age range specified by the manufacturer, as well as battery requirements and how quickly the toy will drain the batteries.

The organization also held a toy sale every November, selling that year's tested toys at a discount. It also sold new copies of award-winning toys and games for a discount. The proceeds of the sale, representing the bulk of the organization's budget, were used to fund travel to toy fairs in Toronto or New York City. Information gathered at these fairs was used to generate lists of prospective toys to test, which were then requested from the manufacturers.

The organization ceased operations in June 2015 after failing to acquire sufficient operational funding and corporate sponsorships. In April 2015, it sold its remaining book and toy inventory.
