= Kindergarten Cop 2 =

- Official DVD cover
- Directed by: Don Michael Paul
- Screenplay by: David H. Steinberg; Murray Salem; Herschel Weingrod; Timothy Harris
- Story by: Murray Salem
- Based on: Kindergarten Cop by Murray Salem
- Produced by: Mike Elliott; Greg Holstien
- Starring: Dolph Lundgren; Bill Bellamy; Darla Taylor; Sarah Strange; Aleks Paunovic; Michael P. Northey
- Cinematography: Kamal Derkaoui
- Edited by: Vanick Moradian
- Music by: Jake Monaco
- Production companies: Capital Arts Entertainment; Imagine Entertainment; Universal 1440 Entertainment; Universal Family Entertainment; Where's Arnold Productions
- Distributed by: Universal Pictures Home Entertainment
- Release date: May 17, 2016
- Running time: 100 minutes
- Country: United States
- Language: English

Kindergarten Cop 2 is a 2016 American comedy film starring Dolph Lundgren and directed by Don Michael Paul. It is a standalone sequel to the 1990 film Kindergarten Cop, starring Arnold Schwarzenegger. Principal photography in Maple Ridge, Langley, and Vancouver, British Columbia, Canada took place for 28 days, from July 27 to August 24, 2015. The school at which the film was produced is Kanaka Elementary. The film was released by Universal Pictures Home Entertainment on DVD in the United States on May 17, 2016. Unlike its unrelated predecessor, the film received generally negative reviews from critics.

== Plot ==
Federal agent Zack Reed and his partner Sanders are pursuing dangerous criminal leader Alexander Zogu who has discovered a copy of the FBI witness protection database. The file has been stored on a USB flash drive by a now-deceased kindergarten teacher Kevin Flaherty.

After Sanders interviews the teacher's students and the staff, no one seems to know where the drive is. So Reed uses a fictitious resumé to apply for the role of teacher to the bereaved class and is easily hired.

The school has a very liberal/modern perspective on teaching and managing children which is, at first, quite awkward to Reed's more straightforward ways. On his first day, Reed struggles to keep the kids' attention and to keep it together. One boy has severe allergies, especially nuts, so mayhem breaks out when they realize that Reed is eating peanut butter. Again he loses control when he gives them chocolate cookies and they bounce off the walls from the sugar.

Although day one is rough, Reed insists he will persevere without Sanders' help. He uses an air horn to command obedience, but the principal gives him one strike. This motivates Reed to apologize and ask for some assistance from Sanders (a father of five). Reed learns to lead the class in a more relational and emotionally aware way.

When fellow kindergarten teacher Olivia catches him in her office snooping for the thumb drive, Reed asks her out on a date, and they begin to connect romantically.

Reed and Olivia's classes compete in a capture the flag competition, and his class win for the first time. As his students explain that the other kids are larger, he gives them a trojan horse strategy.

The criminal leader, Zogu, captures the FBI surveillance van and discovers the crucial role of the children. In the meantime, Reed reveals his cover to the principal, telling her about Zogu and the importance of locking down the school.

Zogu finds the thumb drive with the children on a field trip, but they manage to surprise him with their trojan horse attack strategy. The drive is returned to the FBI, and the kids celebrate their victory with their parents.

== Cast ==
- Dolph Lundgren as Agent Reed
- Bill Bellamy as Agent Sanders
- Darla Taylor as Olivia Halstrom
- Sarah Strange as Miss Sinclaire
- Aleks Paunovic as Alexander Zogu
- Michael P. Northey as Hal Pasquale
- Raphael Alejandro as Cowboy
- Valencia Budijanto as Patience McNally
- William Budijanto as Tripp McNally
- Oscar Hartley as Simon
- Tyréah Herbert as Hannah
- Abbie Magnuson as Molly Edwards
- Dean Petriw as Jett Patterson
- Matilda Shoichet-Stoll as Sophie
- Fiona Vroom as Michelle
- Andre Tricoteux as Valmir
- Enid-Raye Adams as Mrs. Patterson, Jett's Mom
- Jody Thompson as Hot Mom
- Rebecca Olson as Katja
- Jenny Sandersson as Hot Mom
- Carolyn Adair as Felicity
- Nicholas Carella as Bernie the Hot Single Dad
- Josiah Black as Jason Flaherty
- James Ralph as SWAT Leader
- Blake Stadel as Mr. Edwards, Molly's Dad
- Percy as Buttercup the Pig
- Mikey as Meeja the Guinea Pig, the owner of Jett
- Chris Violette as Country Bar Bartender (uncredited)
- Tawny West as Line Dancer (uncredited)

== Production ==
=== Casting ===
On June 1, 2015, it was reported that The Garden and Half Past Dead filmmaker Don Michael Paul would be directing the film, and Arnold Schwarzenegger would not be reprising his role as Detective John Kimble. Schwarzenegger announced that his character Detective John Kimble is now officially retired from being a kindergarten teacher and police officer. Schwarzenegger was replaced by Dolph Lundgren as a new character, FBI Agent Zack Reed.

On December 21, 2015, the 25th anniversary of the theatrical release of the original film, the first official photos of Kindergarten Cop 2 were released via About.

== Reception ==
=== Critical response ===
On the review aggregator website Rotten Tomatoes, 29% of 7 critics' reviews are positive.

Common Sense Media gave the film a score of 2 out of 5, and described it as "FBI man meets cute kids in trite comedy; violence, profanity." Randall Colburn of Consequence of Sound gave it a grade D+ and wrote: "Kindergarten Cop 2 ultimately resonates as nothing more than a sub-par rendition of its predecessor. The script is bad, the direction is uninspired, the villain is boring, and Lundgren can't navigate that space between comedy and action like Arnie can."
