= Sung-woo =

- Hangul: 성우
- RR: Seongu
- MR: Sŏngu

Sung-woo, also spelled Seong-woo or Seong-wu, is a Korean given name.

People with this name include:

- Lee Seong-u, South Korean politician; see List of members of the South Korean Constituent Assembly, 1948–50
- Park Seong-u, South Korean politician; see List of members of the National Assembly (South Korea), 1950–54
- Choi Seong-woo (born 1954), South Korean voice actress
- Shin Sung-woo (born 1967), South Korean rock singer and actor
- Park Sung-woo (badminton) (born 1971), South Korean badminton player
- Bae Seong-woo (born 1972), South Korean actor
- Park Sung-woo (artist) (born 1972), South Korean manhwa artist
- Youn Sung-woo (born 1989), South Korean footballer
- Jeon Sung-woo (born 1987), South Korean actor
- Ong Seong-wu (born 1995), South Korean singer and actor, former member of Wanna One

== See also ==
- List of Korean given names
