= Kindergarten Cop =

1990 action comedy film directed by Ivan Reitman

- Theatrical release poster
- Directed by: Ivan Reitman
- Screenplay by: Murray Salem; Herschel Weingrod; Timothy Harris
- Story by: Murray Salem
- Produced by: Ivan Reitman; Brian Grazer
- Starring: Arnold Schwarzenegger; Penelope Ann Miller; Pamela Reed; Linda Hunt; Richard Tyson; Carroll Baker
- Cinematography: Michael Chapman
- Edited by: Wendy Greene Bricmont; Sheldon Kahn
- Music by: Randy Edelman
- Production company: Imagine Entertainment
- Distributed by: Universal Pictures
- Release date: December 21, 1990
- Running time: 111 minutes
- Country: United States
- Language: English
- Budget: $26 million
- Box office: $202 million

Kindergarten Cop is a 1990 American action comedy film directed by Ivan Reitman and written by Murray Salem, Herschel Weingrod, and Timothy Harris. The film stars Arnold Schwarzenegger as John Kimble, a tough Los Angeles police detective who goes undercover as a kindergarten teacher in a small Oregon town to locate the ex-wife and son of a dangerous drug dealer. The cast also includes Penelope Ann Miller, Pamela Reed, Linda Hunt, Richard Tyson, and Carroll Baker.

The film marked the second collaboration between Reitman and Schwarzenegger following the success of Twins (1988), continuing Schwarzenegger's shift into comedic roles after years of action-film stardom. Several actors, including Bill Murray and Patrick Swayze, were considered for the lead role before Schwarzenegger was cast. Production involved location filming in Astoria, Oregon, where scenes at the fictional elementary school were shot at John Jacob Astor Elementary School, with additional interior filming completed at Universal Studios Hollywood. The film's musical score was composed by Randy Edelman.

Released in North America by Universal Pictures on December 21, 1990, Kindergarten Cop was a commercial success, grossing about $202 million worldwide, ranking among the highest-grossing films of the year. Critical reception was mixed, stating that the plot was too adult for children and too childish for adults. However, reviewers praised Schwarzenegger's comedic performance and his willingness to subvert the tough action-hero image that had defined much of his career. A standalone sequel, Kindergarten Cop 2 (2016), starring Dolph Lundgren, was later released direct to video.

== Plot ==
In Los Angeles, ruthless drug lord Cullen Crisp murders a man who had provided information about the whereabouts of Crisp's ex-wife, Rachel, who went into hiding years earlier with their young son, Cullen Jr. Crisp is arrested by John Kimble, a gruff, hard-driving LAPD narcotics detective who has pursued him for years, and is detained based on the testimony of sex worker Cindy, who witnessed the murder. Believing Rachel's testimony is essential to securing a conviction, Kimble is partnered with detective Phoebe O'Hara and sent to locate her in Astoria, Oregon.

Unaware of Rachel's new identity, the pair plan to find her through Cullen Jr., believed to be enrolled in kindergarten at the local elementary school. O'Hara intends to pose as a substitute teacher to observe the class, but when she falls seriously ill, Kimble is forced to take her place despite having no teaching experience and little patience for young children.

Kimble's first days in the classroom are chaotic, and principal Ingrid Schlowski doubts his suitability. Over time, however, he establishes order using firm discipline, structured routines, and unconventional methods drawn from his police background. He gradually bonds with the children, earning their trust and affection while discovering he enjoys teaching. His pet ferret becomes the class mascot, and his growing empathy reveals a gentler side of his personality. Meanwhile, O'Hara recovers and remains in Astoria, posing as Kimble's Austrian sister Ursula Kimble while continuing the investigation.

As Kimble settles into the role, he becomes increasingly invested in the children's welfare. When he suspects one pupil is being abused by his father, Kimble confronts the man and ensures legal action is taken, impressing Schlowski despite his unorthodox approach. He also grows close to fellow teacher Joyce and her son Dominic, one of his students, and reveals he has a teenage son living with his ex-wife. Dominic quickly comes to see Kimble as a father figure. Joyce explains that Dominic's father is absent, refusing to elaborate. From his observations, Kimble infers Joyce is Rachel and Dominic is Cullen Jr. Meanwhile, Cindy dies after using cocaine tainted by Crisp's mother and accomplice, Eleanor, eliminating the prosecution's key witness. With the case collapsing, Crisp is released and travels to Astoria with Eleanor to reclaim his son.

Realizing the danger, Kimble confronts Rachel and reveals his identity, promising protection if she cooperates. Though initially furious at his deception, she is persuaded to stay with Kimble after he admits that his ex-wife prevents him from seeing his own son and that he does not want to lose Rachel or Dominic.

Crisp arrives at the school and starts a fire in the library as a diversion, enabling him to seize Dominic. Kimble confronts him, but Crisp takes the boy hostage. Kimble's ferret—hidden in Dominic's sweater—bites Crisp, allowing Dominic to escape. Crisp shoots Kimble in the leg, and Kimble returns fire, fatally wounding him. Outside, Eleanor strikes O'Hara with her car before entering the school. Finding her son dead, she shoots Kimble in the shoulder and demands Dominic's location, but O'Hara arrives just in time to knock her unconscious with a baseball bat. Eleanor is arrested, and Kimble is hospitalized with his injuries, to the distress of his students; both he and O'Hara recover.

Afterward, O'Hara returns to Los Angeles, while Kimble leaves police work and remains in Astoria as a full-time kindergarten teacher. Joyce stays with him, and the two share a kiss as the children cheer.

== Cast ==
- Arnold Schwarzenegger as LAPD Detective John Kimble
- Penelope Ann Miller as Joyce Palmieri / Rachel Myatt Crisp
- Pamela Reed as LAPD Detective Phoebe O'Hara/Ursula Kimble
- Linda Hunt as Miss Ingrid Schlowski
- Richard Tyson as Cullen Crisp
- Carroll Baker as Eleanor Crisp
- Cathy Moriarty as Jillian, Sylvester's Mother
- Christian and Joseph Cousins as Dominic Palmieri / Cullen Crisp Jr.
- Park Overall as Samantha's Mother
- Jayne Brook as Mrs. Sullivan, Zach's Mother
- Betty Lou Henson as Keisha's Mother
- Heidi Swedberg as Joshua's Mother
- Richard Portnow as Captain Salazar
- Alix Koromzay as Cindy
- Bob Nelson as Henry Shoop
- Angela Bassett as Stewardess
- John Hammil as Zach's father

=== Kimble's Class ===
- Justin Page as Zach Sullivan
- Peter Rakow as Joshua
- Sarah Rose Karr as Emma
- Marissa Rosen as Samantha
- Ben McCreary as Lowell
- Miko Hughes as Joseph
- Robert Cave as John
- Ben Diskin as Sylvester
- Tameka Runnels as Keisha
- Medha Garg as Latiana
- Brian Wagner as William
- John Graas as Kevin
- Jimmy Darrin Jackson III as Sedgewinn
- Ian Baumer as Sam
- Amy Wald as Sarah
- Tiffany Mataras as Tina
- Krystle Mataras as Rina
- James Chance as Matthew
- Adam Wylie as Larry
- Nicole Nagorsky as Heather
- Ross Malinger as Harvey
- Amber Reaves as Mary
- Odette Yustman as Rosa
- Tina Hart as Dorothy
- Emily Ann Lloyd as Jennifer
- Haley Urman as Courtney
- Bethany Allyn as Catherine
- Zachary Marsh as Nick
- Anthony Wong as Tom
- Remone Bradley as Erwin

== Production ==
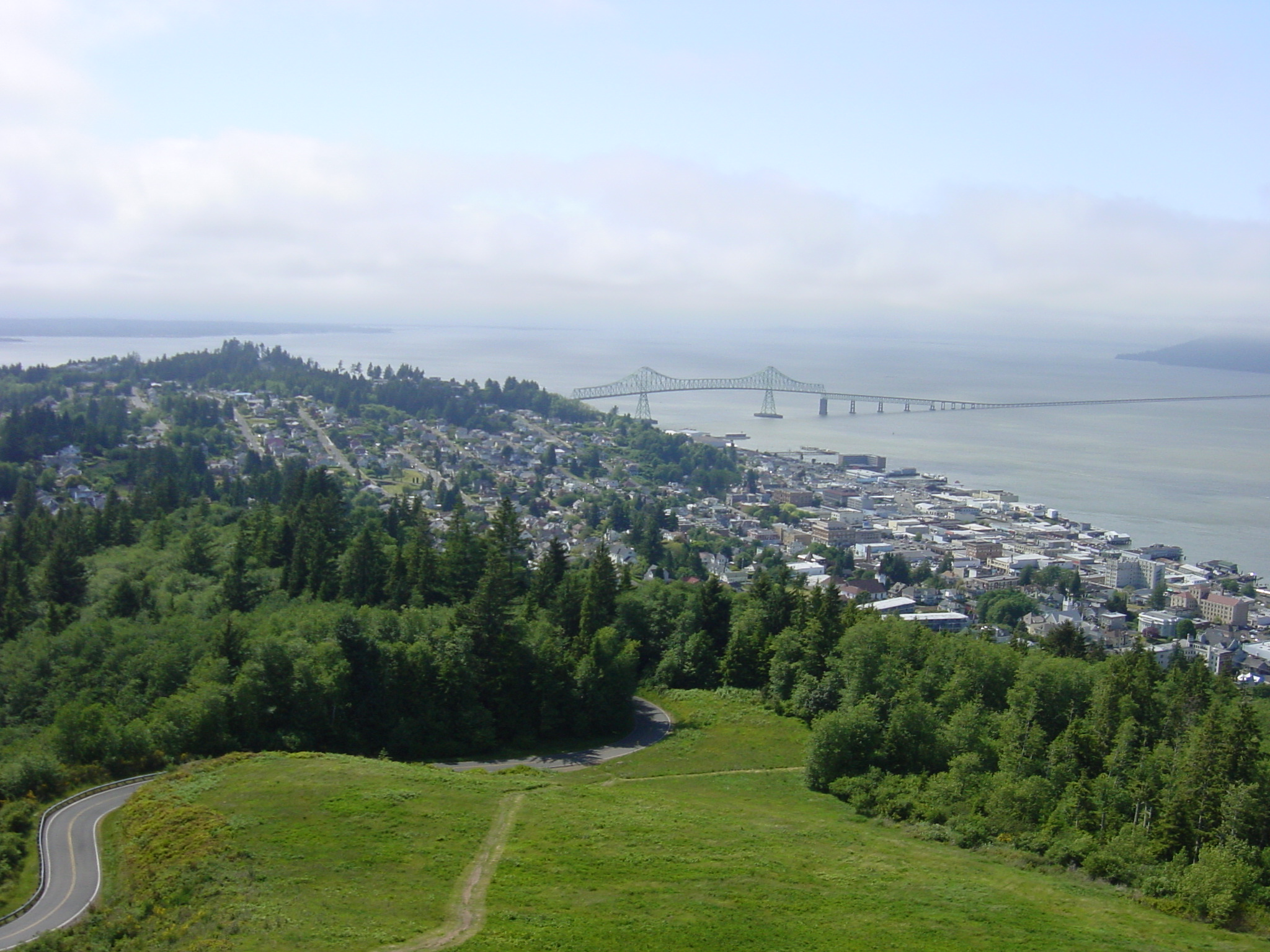
Much of the filming was done on location in Astoria, Oregon, the setting of the film.

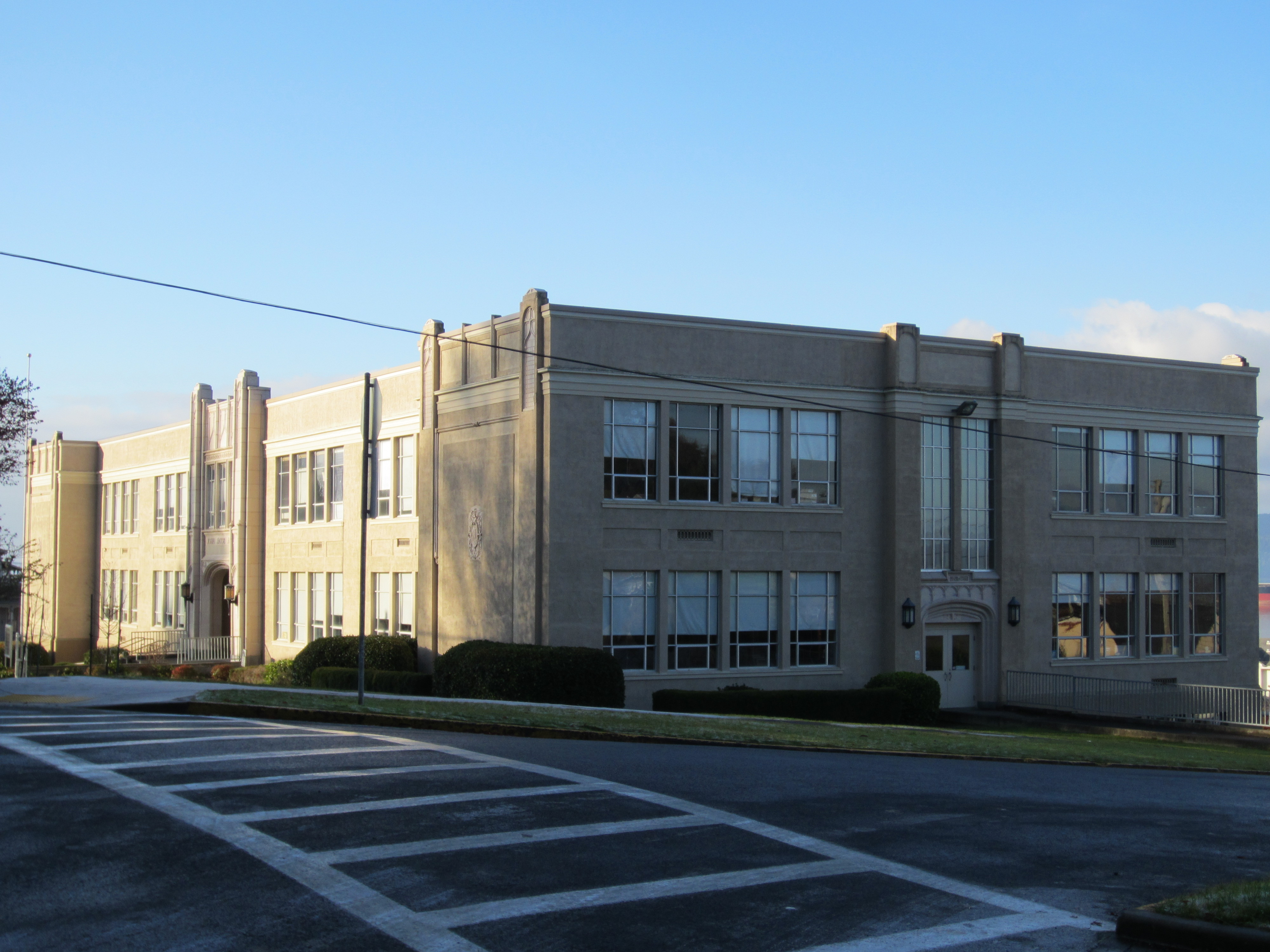
The school interior and exterior were filmed at the John Jacob Astor Elementary School in Northeast Astoria.

=== Casting ===
Bill Murray and Patrick Swayze were initially approached to play the role of Kimble. Danny DeVito was also considered for the role, but Ivan Reitman nixed the idea as he felt DeVito's height would make him seem less believable as Kimble. Ultimately, DeVito's former costar from Twins, Arnold Schwarzenegger, was chosen for the part.

Director Reitman and casting director Michael Chinich auditioned more than 2,000 children for the roles of the pupils. Elijah Wood was among those who unsuccessfully auditioned for a role.

=== Filming ===
Exterior scenes at Astoria Elementary School were filmed at John Jacob Astor Elementary School, located at 3550 Franklin Avenue in Astoria, Oregon. Principal photography took place from May 31, 1990 to August 31, 1990.

Universal Studios hired local artists Judith Niland and Carl Lyle Jenkins to paint murals on the walls at Astoria, and provided new playground equipment, a fenced playground, and a new lawn and hedges around the school. Most of the filming was completed after school was out in June 1990, allowing many of the pupils and faculty to be extras in the film. Pupils' artwork was also used. While on location, Schwarzenegger insisted on a private studio for daily workouts and weightlifting be assembled for his use.

Other locations used in or near Astoria include the Bayview Motel, Commercial Street in downtown Astoria, and exteriors outside the Seafare Restaurant on Industry Street. The school picnic was filmed at Ecola State Park near Cannon Beach, Oregon, 25 miles (40 km) south of Astoria. Scenes at Joyce and Dominic's house were filmed at a private residence located at 414 Exchange Street and highway scenes were filmed on U.S. Route 26 east of Seaside, Oregon, 20 miles (32 km) from Astoria.

Interior school scenes were shot at Universal Studios in Hollywood. The film's opening scene was filmed at the Westfield MainPlace Mall in Santa Ana, California, and South Coast Plaza in Costa Mesa, California.

== Music ==
Kindergarten Cop: Original Motion Picture Soundtrack

Film score (Digital download / Audio CD) by Randy Edelman
- Released: August 31, 1993
- Label: Varese Sarabande

No.	Title	Length
1.	"Astoria School Theme"	1:06
2.	"Children's Montage"	3:21
3.	"Love Theme (Joyce)"	2:30
4.	"Stalking Crisp"	3:40
5.	"Dominic's Theme/A Rough Day"	1:54
6.	"The Line Up/Fireside Chat"	2:57
7.	"Rain Ride"	1:55
8.	"The Kindergarten Cop"	1:27
9.	"Poor Cindy/Gettysburg Address"	2:06
10.	"A Dinner Invitation"	0:47
11.	"Love Theme Reprise"	1:25
12.	"A Magic Place"	2:54
13.	"Kimble Reveals the Truth"	1:45
14.	"The Tower/Everything Is OK"	2:29
15.	"Fire at the School"	5:38
16.	"Closing"	2:14
Total length:		34:48

== Reception ==
=== Box office ===
Kindergarten Cop was the second-highest-grossing film, behind Home Alone, during the week of January 8, 1991. It grossed $91.4 million in North America and $101.5 million internationally. It was released in the United Kingdom on February 1, 1991, and topped the country's box office that weekend.

=== Critical response ===
On Rotten Tomatoes, Kindergarten Cop has a rating of 54% based on 39 reviews and an average rating of 5.60/10. The site's consensus reads, "Arnold Schwarzenegger substitutes his action brio with some refreshingly adept comedic timing, but Kindergarten Cop is too grim for children and too cloying for adults." On Metacritic, it has a score of 61 out of 100 based on 15 critics, indicating "generally favorable" reviews. Audiences polled by CinemaScore gave it an average grade of "A−" on an A+ to F scale.

Reviewer Caryn James of The New York Times said, "Like Twins, which was also directed by Ivan Reitman, nothing in the film is as funny as the idea of it." In Kim Newman's review for Empire, he wrote, "With a heart of purest mush, the film still manages to be generally entertaining" and gave it 3 stars out of 5. An Entertainment Weekly review at the time of release notes that: "the movie never quite gels and it is not going to generate quite the mega hit business their producers are counting on", giving it a "C" grade.

Roger Ebert said the film "is made up of two parts that shouldn't fit, but somehow they do, making a slick entertainment out of the improbable, the impossible and Arnold Schwarzenegger" and awarded it three stars.

On April Fools' Day 2012, as a prank, the film was announced to be selected for a release on DVD and Blu-ray Disc as part of The Criterion Collection, a video distribution company dedicated to the release of "important classic and contemporary films". It was said to be selected as important, in part because of its genre revisionist use of both the policier and family comedy genres in the same film. It was released on Blu-ray, though not by Criterion, on July 1, 2014. Kino Lorber released the film on 4K UHD on January 23, 2024.

=== Legacy ===
For the video game Silent Hill, parts of Astoria Elementary School from the film were used as reference for the location Midwich Elementary School. Several of Schwarzenegger's memorable lines from the film were used in sound boards for prank phone calls that became popular in the early 2000s. During an April 2021 interview on Jimmy Kimmel Live!, Schwarzenegger stated that the idea behind the making of Superhero Kindergarten came from his desire "to do a sequel to Kindergarten Cop".

A 1996 Filipino action comedy movie, Ang Titser Kong Pogi (lit. "My Handsome Teacher"), is a remake of Kindergarten Cop, starring Bong Revilla in the title role.

== Sequel ==
A standalone sequel starring Dolph Lundgren, Kindergarten Cop 2, was released direct to DVD in May 2016.

== See also ==
- Arnold Schwarzenegger filmography
- List of American films of 1990
- Olympian Anthony Adam, an Indian Malayalam film with a similar plot
