= Twins (1988 film) =

American buddy film directed by Ivan Reitman

- Theatrical release poster
- Directed by: Ivan Reitman
- Written by: William Davies; Timothy Harris; William Osborne; Herschel Weingrod
- Produced by: Ivan Reitman
- Starring: Arnold Schwarzenegger; Danny DeVito; Kelly Preston; Chloe Webb; Bonnie Bartlett
- Cinematography: Andrzej Bartkowiak
- Edited by: Donn Cambern; Sheldon Kahn
- Music by: Georges Delerue; Randy Edelman
- Production company: Ivan Reitman Productions
- Distributed by: Universal Pictures
- Release date: December 9, 1988
- Running time: 107 minutes
- Country: United States
- Language: English
- Budget: $18 million
- Box office: $216.6 million

Twins is a 1988 American buddy comedy film directed and produced by Ivan Reitman and written by William Davies, William Osborne, Timothy Harris, and Herschel Weingrod. The film stars Arnold Schwarzenegger and Danny DeVito as Julius and Vincent Benedict, twin brothers created as a result of a secret genetic experiment, who were separated at birth and raised in drastically different circumstances. Also starring Kelly Preston, Chloe Webb and Bonnie Bartlett, the story follows the naïve but physically imposing Julius as he travels to Los Angeles to find Vincent, a cynical small-time crook, and the two set out on a journey to uncover the truth about their origins and locate their long-lost mother.

The project marked the first collaboration between Reitman and Schwarzenegger and represented a major departure for Schwarzenegger, who had previously been known primarily for action films. Because Universal Pictures considered casting him in a broad comedy a financial risk, Schwarzenegger, DeVito, and Reitman agreed to forgo their usual salaries in exchange for a share of the film's profits. The film was produced on a budget of about $18 million, with location filming taking place in California and northern New Mexico, including scenes shot around Santa Fe, Taos, and Los Alamos.

Released in the United States on December 9, 1988, Twins was a commercial success. The film opened at number one at the U.S. box office and remained there for several weeks, eventually grossing $112 million domestically and $216 million worldwide. Its success made it one of the highest-grossing films of 1988 and resulted in large profit participations for its stars and director due to their backend deal.

Critical reception to Twins was mixed, with reviewers divided over the film's reliance on the "wackiness" at the expense of its narrative. The film's success led to further collaborations between Schwarzenegger and Reitman such as Kindergarten Cop (1990) and Junior (1994), the latter of which reunited them with DeVito. Plans for a sequel titled Triplets were developed for several years but were ultimately cancelled following Reitman's death in 2022.

== Plot ==
A secret genetic experiment attempts to produce the perfect child by combining the DNA of several distinguished individuals. The embryo unexpectedly split, resulting in twins: Julius and Vincent Benedict. Their mother, Mary Ann Benedict, is told that Julius died at birth and is never informed of Vincent's existence. The boys are raised separately, each unaware of the other. Julius is taken to a remote island and raised by one of the scientists. He grows into an optimistic, physically imposing, highly educated man, though he remains naïve about the outside world. Vincent, meanwhile, is abandoned at a Los Angeles orphanage and grows up alone, becoming a short, balding, cynical small-time criminal.

On Julius's thirty-fifth birthday, he learns of Vincent's existence and travels to Los Angeles to find him. He locates Vincent in jail and bails him out, though Vincent is skeptical of Julius's claim that they are twins, given their obvious physical differences. After Julius protects him from loan sharks, Vincent begins to accept him. Vincent introduces Julius to his girlfriend, Linda Mason, and her sister Marnie. While Linda reluctantly tolerates Vincent's lifestyle, Marnie dislikes his selfish treatment of her sister. Julius, inexperienced with women, fails to notice Marnie's attraction to him.

Vincent reveals a document suggesting their mother did not die in childbirth, but refuses to search for her, convinced she abandoned him. Soon afterward, he steals a Cadillac, intending to sell it, only to discover a prototype fuel injector hidden in the trunk. Realizing it was meant to be delivered to wealthy industrialist Beetroot McKinley in Houston for $5 million, Vincent decides to deliver it himself and collect the payment to settle his debts. Meanwhile, Webster, the ruthless courier originally responsible for the delivery, begins tracking Vincent down.

Encouraged by Julius's optimism about finding family, Vincent reluctantly agrees to search for their mother while traveling to complete the delivery. They locate one of the scientists involved in their creation, who directs them to an art colony near Santa Fe where Mary Ann lives. The scientist dismissively calls Vincent a genetic failure, prompting Julius to defend his brother angrily.

At the colony, the twins speak with a woman who claims Mary Ann Benedict has died. In reality, she is their mother, but she dismisses their story as a cruel joke. Hurt and convinced he was unwanted, Vincent abandons Julius and travels to Houston alone to deliver the injector.

In Houston, he attempts to complete the exchange, but is confronted by Webster, who murders McKinley and attempts to take the money. Julius arrives and pursues Webster through the building while Vincent initially escapes with the payment. Realizing he cannot abandon his brother, Vincent returns and offers the money to save them. When Webster prepares to kill them anyway, the brothers work together to defeat him.

Afterwards, Vincent gives the injector and the money to the authorities, while secretly keeping $1 million. The brothers reconcile and start a consulting business together. News reports about the unusual twins reach the art colony, where Mary Ann realizes they are her sons. Mary Ann finds and tearfully reunites with them. Julius and Vincent later marry Marnie and Linda, and each has twins of their own.

== Cast ==
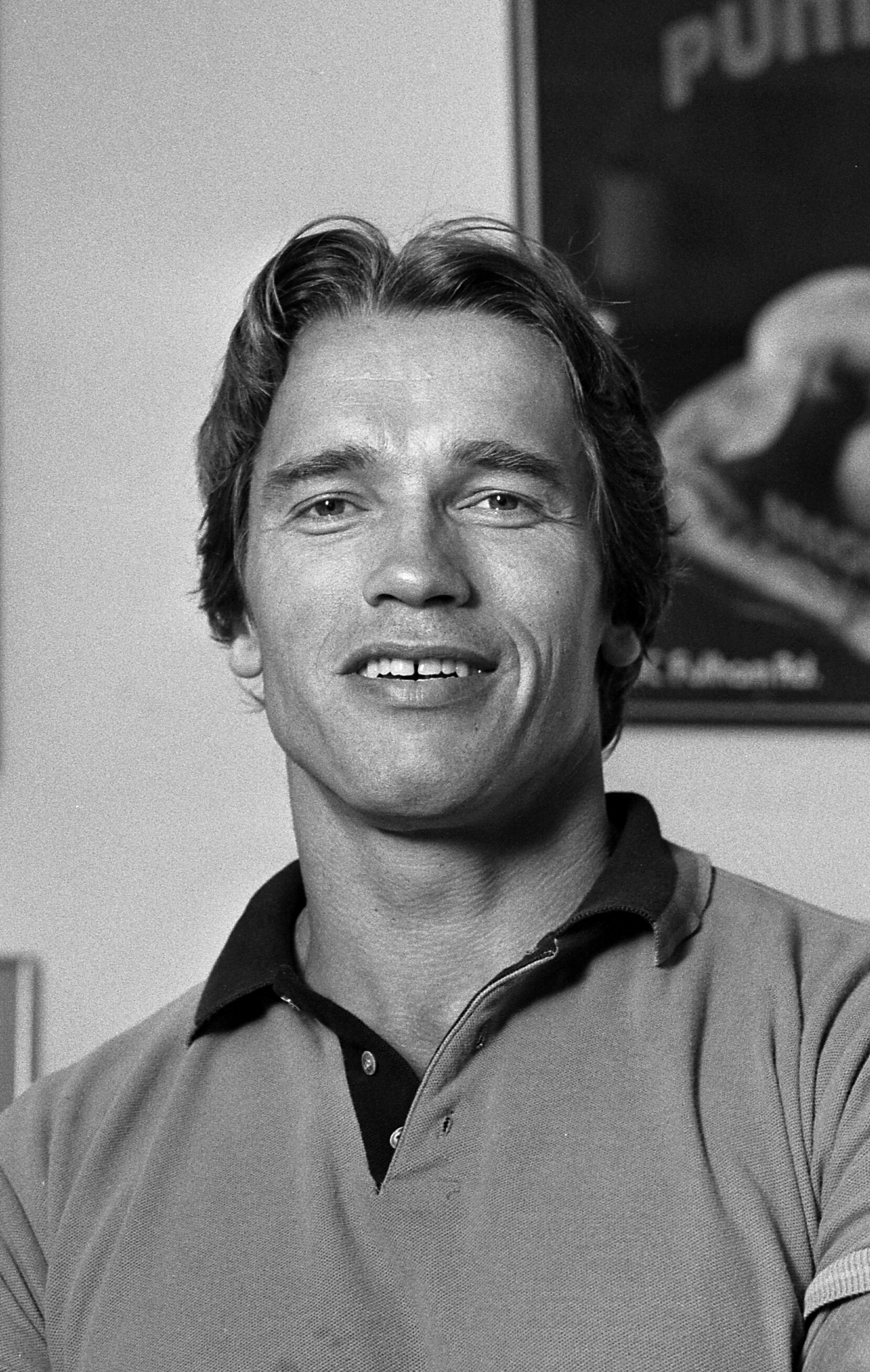
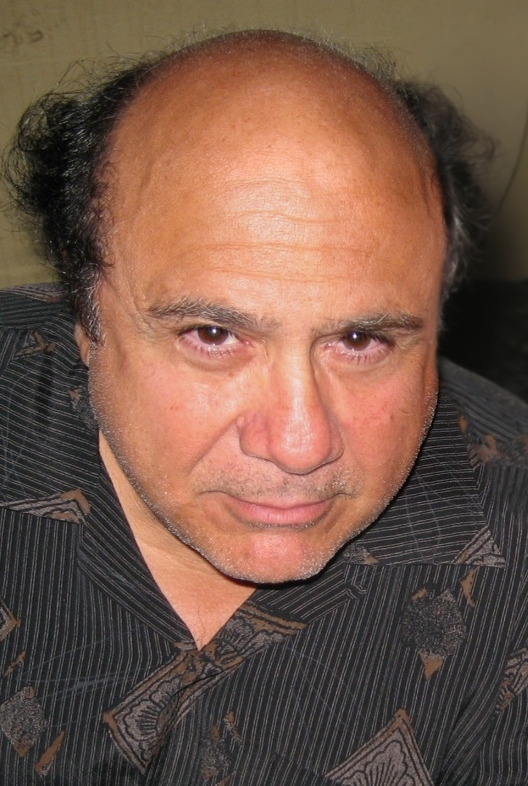
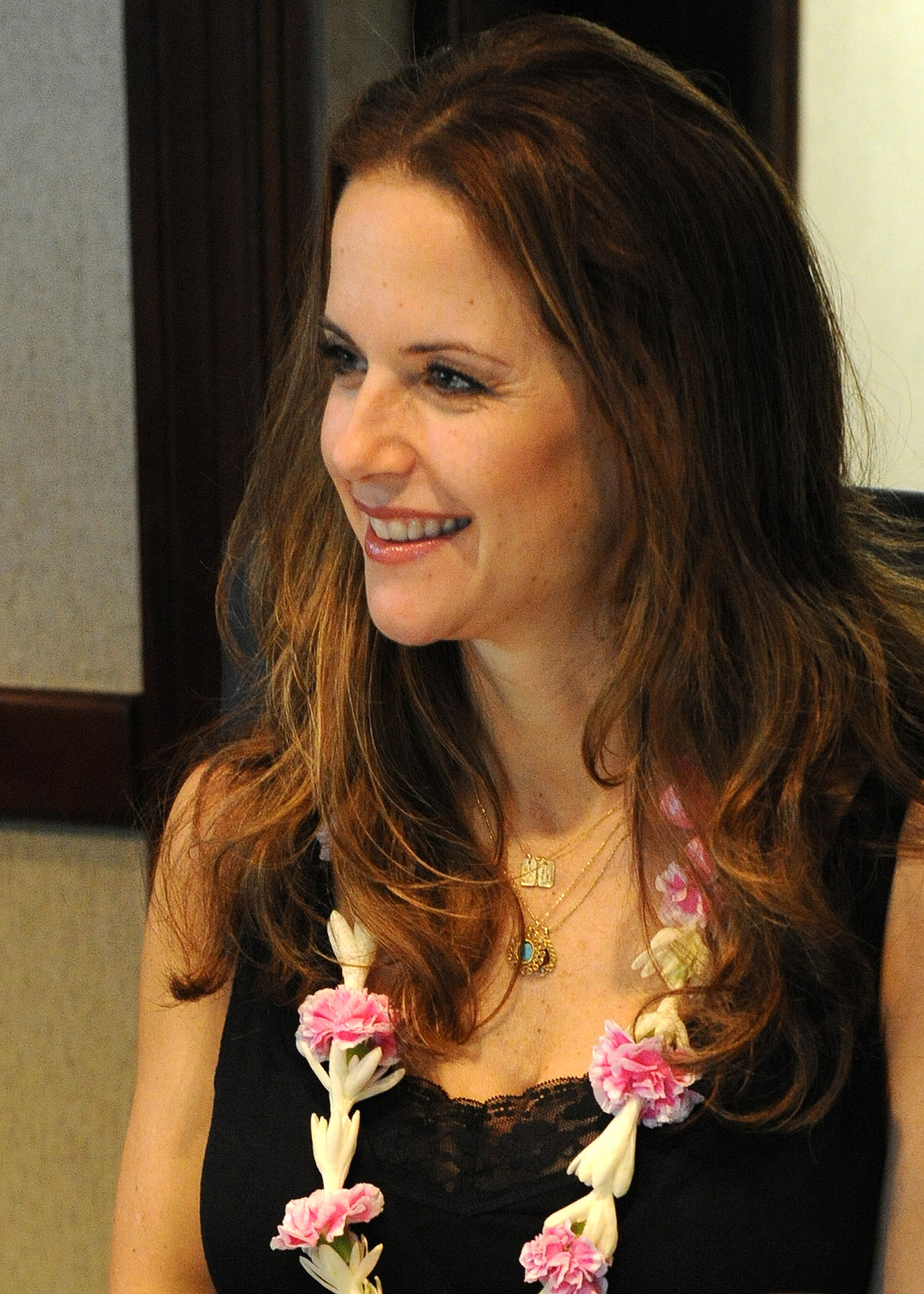
Arnold Schwarzenegger (pictured in 1984), Danny DeVito (2006), and Kelly Preston (2011)
- Arnold Schwarzenegger as Julius Benedict
- Danny DeVito as Vincent Benedict
- Kelly Preston as Marnie Mason
- Chloe Webb as Linda Mason
- Bonnie Bartlett as Maryanne Benedict
- Trey Wilson as Beetroot McKinley
- Marshall Bell as Webster
- David Caruso as Al Greco
- Hugh O'Brian as Granger
- Nehemiah Persoff as Dr. Mitchell Traven
- Maury Chaykin as Burt Klane
- Tony Jay as Professor Werner

Twins also features Tom McCleister as Bob Klane, David Efron as Morris Klane, Sven-Ole Thorsen as Sam Klane, and Gus Rethwisch as Dave Klane, a family of loan sharks, Richard Portnow as Tony, and Robert Harper as Gilbert Larsen. Director Ivan Reitman's children, Jason and Catherine make cameo appearances as Granger's grandchildren.

== Production ==
The original music score was composed by Georges Delerue and Randy Edelman. Edelman has scored three more films for director Ivan Reitman (Ghostbusters II; Kindergarten Cop; and Six Days, Seven Nights) whereas this was Delerue's only work for him. This was conceived after the success of Legal Eagles.

Notably, this was Arnold Schwarzenegger's first time starring in a major comedy. Because Universal Pictures viewed this as a significant risk compared with having Schwarzenegger make another profitable action film, Schwarzenegger voluntarily took no salary in exchange for a share of the film's profits. Co-star Danny DeVito and director Reitman made similar deals. When the film was a major financial success – box office of $216 million against an $18 million production budget – the three together earned a significant share of the overall profits. In a 2016 interview with Graham Bensinger, Schwarzenegger stated that the decision to "invest in myself" by trying comedy and forgoing the salary in exchange for a share of the film's profits was one of the best decisions of his entire life. He also told Andy Cohen in 2025 that Twins made him the most money of any film in his career .

=== Filming ===
Many of the outdoor scenes were filmed in northern New Mexico. Locations and backgrounds included the Rio Grande Gorge Bridge near Taos, the San Francisco de Asis Mission Church in Ranchos de Taos, St. Francis Cathedral in Santa Fe and buildings in Los Alamos.

== Music ==
=== Soundtrack ===
- The film's title theme song
  - Performed by Philip Bailey and Little Richard, reached No. 82 on the Billboard Hot 100 chart in 1989.
- Yakety Yak
  - Performed by 2 Live Crew with The Coasters
- Brother to Brother
  - Performed by The Spinners
- I'd Die for This Dance
  - Performed by Nicolette Larson
    Jeff Beck
    Terry Bozzio
    Tony Hymas
- Turtle Shoes
  - Performed and Written by Bobby McFerrin
    Herbie Hancock
- It's Too Late
  - Performed by Nayobe
- Green Onions
  - Performed by Jeff Beck
    Terry Bozzio
    Tony Hymas
    Peter Richardson
- The Stumble
  - Performed by Jeff Beck, Terry Bozzio, Tony Hymas and Peter Richardson
- The Train Kept A-Rollin'
  - Performed by Jeff Beck, Tony Hymas and Peter Richardson
- I Only Have Eyes for You
  - Performed by Marilyn Scott

== Reception ==
=== Box office ===
The film was a commercial success, opening as the number one film in the United States earning $11 million on its opening weekend. It retained the top spot for the next two weekends and went on to gross $112 million domestically, being the fifth biggest grossing film in the United States released in 1988. The film was released in the United Kingdom on March 17, 1989, and topped the country's box office that weekend. It grossed $216 million worldwide.

Following the film's success, Reitman and Schwarzenegger teamed up again for Kindergarten Cop (1990) and then again for Junior (1994), which also starred DeVito.

=== Critical response ===
Twins received mixed reviews from critics upon release. On Rotten Tomatoes, it has a 44% approval rating based on 45 reviews. The consensus states: "Though it offers a few modest pleasures for undemanding viewers, Twins leans too heavily on the wackiness of its premise to overcome its narrative shortcomings." On Metacritic the film has a score of 53 out of 100 based on reviews from 13 critics, indicating "mixed or average reviews". Audiences polled by CinemaScore gave the film an average grade of "A−" on an A+ to F scale.

Roger Ebert gave the film 3 out of 4 stars, calling it "engaging entertainment with some big laughs and a sort of warm goofiness".

Vincent Canby of The New York Times gave the film a negative review: "In Twins, which is supposed to be funny, the former Mr. Universe and pint-sized Danny DeVito play twins, the result of a genetic experiment that went awry. To the extent that Twins is carried by anybody, it is carried by Mr. DeVito; Mr. Schwarzenegger is dead weight."

== Cancelled sequel ==
In March 2012, Universal announced the development of a sequel titled Triplets with Schwarzenegger and DeVito due to return with Eddie Murphy as their long lost triplet brother. Reitman was set to co produce.

In April 2015, it was announced that plans for the film were on hold. In March 2018, Schwarzenegger confirmed that the script for Triplets was finished and that Murphy was officially attached to the film. Schwarzenegger briefly discussed how Murphy's character became the triplet brother of his and DeVito's characters saying "funny thing that happens in the mixing of the sperm". It was unknown if Reitman was still to be involved in the film, as originally announced in 2012.

In September 2021, it was announced filming would commence in January 2022 in Boston, with Reitman directing, Schwarzenegger and DeVito reprising their roles as Julius and Vincent Benedict, and Tracy Morgan replacing Eddie Murphy as Schwarzenegger and DeVito's long lost triplet brother. However, Reitman died in February 2022, leaving the status of the film unclear. In May 2023, Schwarzenegger confirmed that a sequel would not be made, as Reitman's son Jason put the idea to an end following his father's death.

== See also ==
- Junior: A 1994 movie also starring Schwarzenegger and DeVito and directed by Reitman.
- List of American films of 1988
