= My Stepmother Is an Alien =

1988 film by Richard Benjamin

- Theatrical release poster
- Directed by: Richard Benjamin
- Written by: Herschel Weingrod; Timothy Harris; Jonathan Reynolds
- Based on: Original screenplay by Jericho Stone
- Produced by: Ronald Parker; Franklin R. Levy
- Starring: Dan Aykroyd; Kim Basinger; Jon Lovitz
- Cinematography: Richard H. Kline
- Edited by: Jacqueline Cambas
- Music by: Alan Silvestri
- Production company: Weintraub Entertainment Group
- Distributed by: Columbia Pictures
- Release date: December 9, 1988
- Running time: 108 minutes
- Country: United States
- Language: English
- Budget: $19 million
- Box office: $13.8 million

My Stepmother Is an Alien is a 1988 American science fiction comedy film directed by Richard Benjamin. It stars Dan Aykroyd, Kim Basinger, and Jon Lovitz. The film follows the story of Celeste, an extraterrestrial woman who is sent on a secret mission to Earth, after her home planet's gravity is mistakenly disrupted by Steven Mills, a widowed scientist raising his daughter Jessie as a single father. The film was the film debut of Juliette Lewis.

The screenplay was written by Herschel Weingrod, Timothy Harris, and Jonathan Reynolds, based on an earlier script by Jericho Stone. Stone had originally pitched the film to Paramount Pictures as a drama that would serve as an allegory for child abuse. When Paramount optioned the story, they suggested that it would be more believable as a comedy. The film was unproduced for four years until Weintraub Entertainment Group put it into production in 1988.

My Stepmother Is an Alien was a box-office bomb, grossing only $13.8 million against a $19 million budget, but later enjoyed lucrative success in the home video market. The film received negative reviews from critics, with most of the responses panning the film's humor and screenplay. Basinger and Lovitz received generally favorable reviews for their comedic performances, but in a New York Times review, Aykroyd was singled out for criticism for his performance as a romantic lead.

== Plot ==
Steven Mills is a widowed scientist working on different ways to send radio waves into deep space. After he sends a radio wave out of the galaxy, it hits the planet of Cosine N to the 8th, disrupting the planet's gravity. Celeste is sent to investigate the supposed attack. She is aided by a device called Bag, an alien tentacle with a single eye and a mind of its own, disguised as a designer purse. Bag is able to create any object, such as diamonds and designer dresses, almost instantaneously. Celeste crashes a party hosted by Steven's playboy brother, Ron, and immediately draws attention to herself by making outdated references to TV shows and political slogans under the mistaken belief that they are current.

Celeste's inexperience almost results in her exposing herself as an alien as she struggles with simple tasks such as cooking and trying to kiss for the first time. She goes home with Steven and spends the night after Bag teaches her about sex, which she then greatly enjoys. Jessie, Steven's 13-year-old daughter, is at first happy that her father has found someone (her mother having died five years previously) but becomes suspicious when she observes Celeste eating the acid from batteries and pulling eggs out of boiling hot water with her bare hands. She unsuccessfully tries to convince her smitten father that something is unusual about Celeste.

When Celeste tells Steven that she must leave in 24 hours, he impulsively proposes and she accepts. Ron also has his doubts about Celeste and tries to dissuade Steven from marrying her, assuming she is an illegal immigrant or planning economic espionage, but then admits he is just jealous his brother has found his dream woman, whereas he longs to find a woman like Princess Stéphanie of Monaco.

Celeste begins enjoying life as a human as she encounters new experiences such as sneezing and love. When Jessie finally confronts her about being an extraterrestrial, Celeste admits her home world has no emotion and that she plans to depart once she gets Steven to recreate the radio signal and send it, reversing the gravity problems on her world. Celeste begins to question her decisions when Jessie says it will devastate her father for whom Celeste has now developed feelings. After Jessie argues with Steven, she runs away and is nearly hit by a car but is saved by Celeste, who reveals her powers in the process. Steven accepts that Celeste is indeed an alien and that she has fallen in love with him and sees Jessie as her daughter. He further integrates her to human society by showing her how to eat real food.

Steven figures out how to recreate the radio wave and saves Celeste's planet. Bag, however, had been sent to Earth to destroy it and eliminate the danger to Celeste's world entirely. After Bag is destroyed by being thrown into the power field of the wave transmitter, the leaders of Celeste's world tell her to finish Bag's job. Steven and Celeste convince them the first ray was an accident, not an act of aggression, and that Earth has many benefits that require further studying. They accept the explanation and demand that Celeste return to explain human culture to them. Not wanting to leave, Celeste negotiates having a native of Earth become an ambassador to their world as a token of goodwill. Ron is selected and accepts; he departs for Celeste's world in a spaceship served by several flight attendants, all of whom look like Princess Stéphanie and are enchanted by Ron's Rolls-Royce, which he takes with him.

== Cast ==
- Dan Aykroyd as Steven Mills
- Kim Basinger as Celeste Martin
- Jon Lovitz as Ron Mills
- Alyson Hannigan as Jessie Mills
- Joseph Maher as Lucas Budlong
- Seth Green as Fred Glass
- Ann Prentiss as the voice of Bag
- Wesley Mann as Grady
- Tony Jay as council chief
- Peter Bromilow as Second in command
- Harry Shearer as the voice of Carl Sagan
- Juliette Lewis as Lexie, Jessie's Friend

== Production ==
Screenwriter Jericho Stone developed the story under the working title They’re Coming as a drama, an allegory about child abuse. He pitched this version of the story to Paramount Pictures in 1981. Paramount agreed to option the story and paid him to write the screenplay, but felt it would be more believable as a comedy. On June 20, 1984, Variety reported that Catalina Production Group was planning to start principal photography on They're Coming in late 1984 for Paramount, naming the screenwriters as Stone and Richard Benner; actresses considered for the lead by Paramount included Bette Midler, Shelley Long, Julie Andrews and Raquel Welch. Subsequently, the production moved to 20th Century Fox, which hired Herschel Weingrod and Timothy Harris to rewrite the screenplay. Fox considered Cybill Shepherd and Joan Rivers for the role, but ultimately never produced the film, and it went into turnaround to Weintraub Entertainment Group, where the title was changed to Two Kids.

Director Richard Benjamin read an unfinished version of the screenplay in the early 1980s, but did not become interested in the project until reading a completed draft he received via Weintraub in 1987, and agreed to direct. From Benjamin's recollection, Stone's original screenplay resembled a horror film. By 1988, the screenplay had received further rewriting by Jonathan Reynolds. Stone was ultimately credited only for the story, under his first name, Jericho. The film went into principal photography on February 29, 1988, and wrapped in May of that year; the total cost of production and marketing was reported as $26 million, with $19 million representing the production costs. Other scenes were filmed at 4222 Agnes Avenue in Studio City, Los Angeles, depicting the Steven Mills residence, at the Beach House on the north end of The Strand in Hermosa Beach, at Baxter (GTE corporate headquarters at the time) in Westlake Village, at Van Nuys High School in Van Nuys, and at Anaheim Stadium in Anaheim.

Don Correia served as the choreographer for My Stepmother Is an Alien. Micaela Esdra dubbed for Kim Basinger in Italian while Choi Seong-woo dubbed for Basinger for South Korean audiences.

== Music ==
The soundtrack album was released by Polydor Records.

1. "Room to Move" - Animotion (4:12)
2. "Not Just Another Girl" - Ivan Neville (4:05)
3. "Be the One" - Jackie Jackson (4:15)
4. "I Like the World" - Cameo (6:11)
5. "One Good Lover" - Siren (3:51)
6. "Hot Wives" - Dan Aykroyd (2:53)
7. "Pump Up the Volume" - M.A.R.R.S. (4:06)
8. "Enjoy" - Alan Silvestri (2:54)
9. "The Klystron" - Alan Silvestri (5:33)
10. "The Celeste" - Alan Silvestri (4:56)
11. "Kiss" - Art of Noise feat. Tom Jones (3:30)

Dan Aykroyd and Kim Basinger performed impressions of Jimmy Durante from The Man Who Came to Dinner singing "Did You Ever Have the Feeling" in My Stepmother Is an Alien.

== Release ==
A July press release for the film stated that My Stepmother Is An Alien would be released on November 23, 1988, but it was later pushed to December 9. The film premiered on December 3, 1988, in Washington, D.C., an event attended by stars Aykroyd and Basinger, as well as President-elect George H. W. Bush, future First Lady Barbara Bush and Vice President-elect Dan Quayle. Upon general release, Mayor of Los Angeles Tom Bradley declared December 9 "Stepmother Day", to honor the "importance, dedication, and contribution of stepmothers everywhere", and an appreciation of the film shooting in Los Angeles.

=== Home media ===
My Stepmother Is an Alien was released on VHS on June 8, 1989, by RCA/Columbia Pictures Home Video. It proved successful in the home video market, and finished in the top 30 most-rented films in the United States for 1989.

== Reception ==
=== Box office ===
The film opened at number seven, grossing $2,066,980 in the opening weekend. It went on to gross $13,854,000 in the United States, becoming a box-office failure.

=== Critical response ===
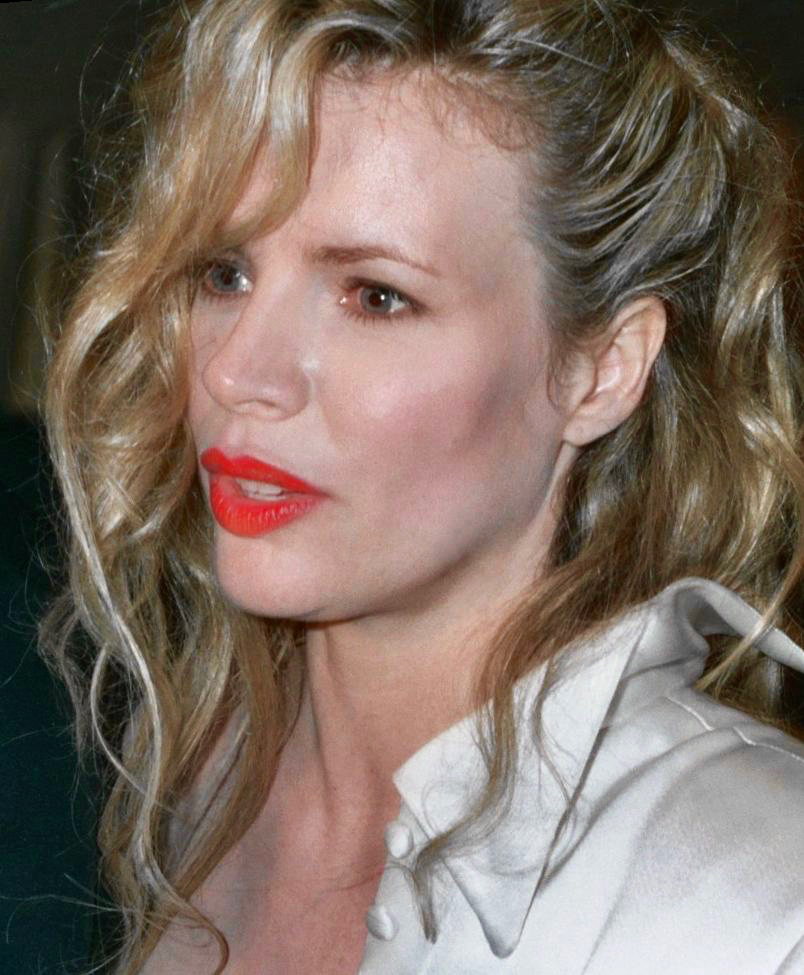
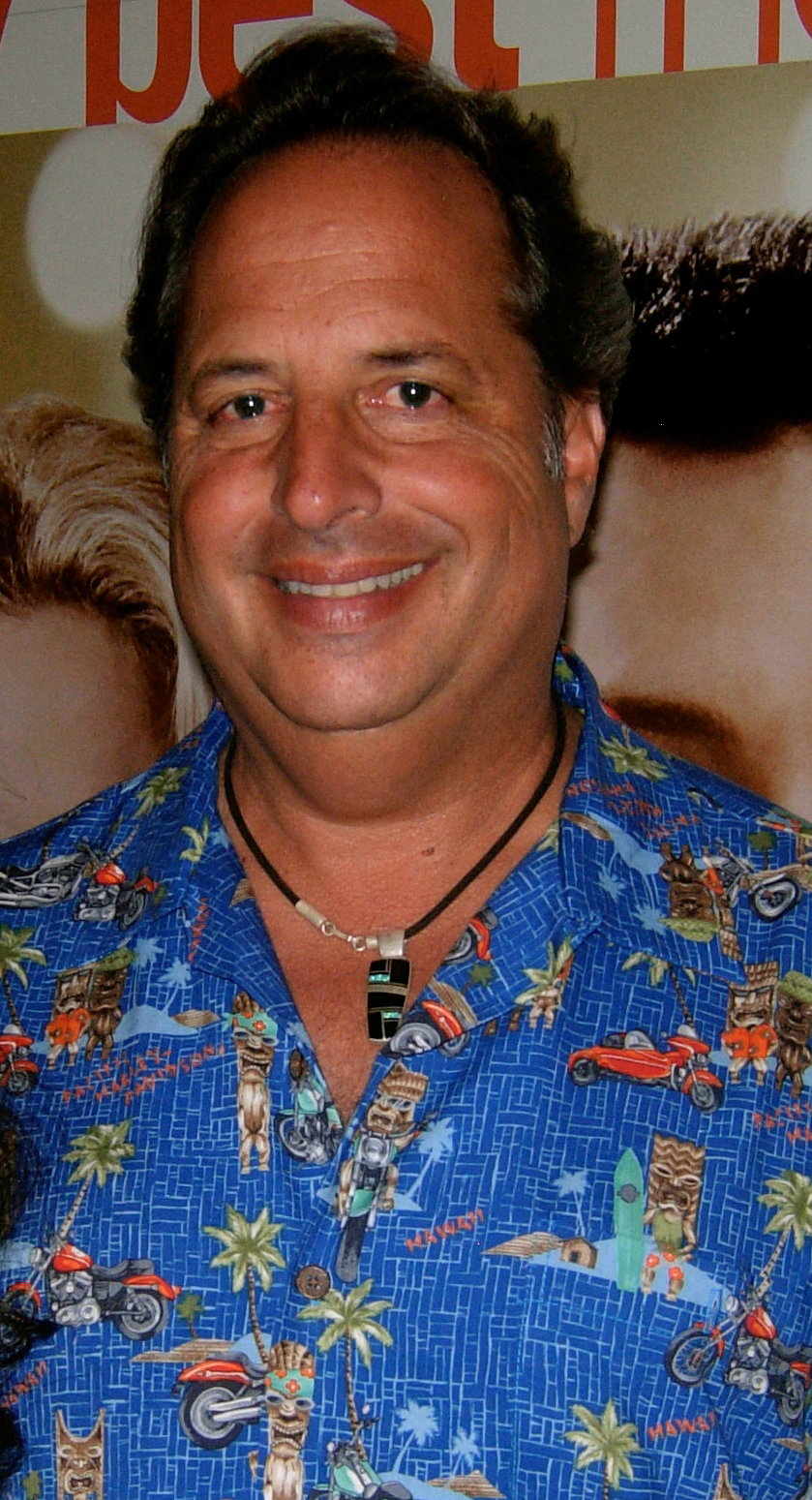
Kim Basinger (left) and Jon Lovitz (right) were praised for their performances.

The film was met with negative reviews. Roger Ebert wrote that Basinger does what she can with the good comic moments, but Benjamin and his writers "seem to have run short of invention." He said plot developments were "foregone conclusions", and that set pieces were "handled routinely, without inspiration." Janet Maslin for The New York Times panned the screenplay and humor, as well as the performance of Dan Aykroyd, who she felt was unfunny and miscast as the romantic lead. She praised the performances of Kim Basinger and Jon Lovitz.

Kevin Thomas of the Los Angeles Times called the sex humor "needlessly crass", but overall praised the film, calling it "solid, wide-appeal holiday fare" which makes good use of Aykroyd and Basinger. The Radio Times gave the film three out of five stars, writing, "...inspired lunacy jostle[s] with predictably slight comic relief", but Basinger makes it "impossible to dislike."

Variety called the film a "failed attempt" to mix many film genres "into a sprightly romp". TV Guide gave the film one star, calling it "A standard formula comedy" with "a predictable, amateurish script". Writing in People, Peter Travers said that director Richard Benjamin "tries to disguise the threadbare plot" and called the film "a clanking bore, except for Basinger". Time Out wrote that despite several entertaining sequences, the film is marred by cruel and juvenile gags."

On the review aggregator website Rotten Tomatoes, the film holds an average rating of 20% based on 25 reviews, with an average rating of 4/10. The website's critics consensus reads: "Kim Basinger is otherworldly funny in this harebrained sci-fi rom com, but she still can't save My Stepmother Is an Alien from alienating intelligent earthlings." Metacritic, which uses a weighted average, assigned the film a score of 47 out of 100, based on 14 critics, indicating "mixed or average" reviews. Audiences surveyed by CinemaScore gave the film a grade "B−" on scale of A to F.

== Namesake ==
A South Korean branch of Baskin-Robbins released an ice cream flavor called "Mom is an alien" named after the movie.

== See also ==
- List of films featuring extraterrestrials

== Sources ==
- Benjamin, Richard (2021). Cosmic Encounters: Directing My Stepmother is An Alien (Blu-ray audio essay). Arrow Films.
