= Falling Down =

1993 American film by Joel Schumacher

- Theatrical release poster
- Directed by: Joel Schumacher
- Written by: Ebbe Roe Smith
- Produced by: Timothy Harris; Arnold Kopelson; Herschel Weingrod
- Starring: Michael Douglas; Robert Duvall; Barbara Hershey; Rachel Ticotin; Frederic Forrest; Tuesday Weld
- Cinematography: Andrzej Bartkowiak
- Edited by: Paul Hirsch
- Music by: James Newton Howard
- Production companies: Le Studio Canal+; Regency Enterprises; Alcor Films
- Distributed by: Warner Bros.
- Release date: February 26, 1993
- Running time: 112 minutes
- Country: United States
- Language: English
- Budget: $25 million
- Box office: $96 million

Falling Down is a 1993 American action drama film directed by Joel Schumacher, written by Ebbe Roe Smith, and starring Michael Douglas and Robert Duvall. Set in Los Angeles, the film tells the story of William Foster, a disgruntled, unemployed defense worker who abandons his car in the middle of a traffic jam and goes on a violent rampage trying to reach his family for his daughter's birthday. Martin Prendergast, a retiring police officer, attempts to catch Foster.

On its release, the film received mixed reviews, with some praising the performances from Douglas and Duvall, while criticizing the film's violence and tone. It grossed $96 million against a $25 million budget, taking the top spot at the United States box office in its first two weeks of release. In later years, the film has gained cult status, with many citing it as one of Schumacher's best films, as well as one of Douglas's best roles. The film has since continued to be analyzed for its themes of the class system, economic pressures, and mental health.

== Plot ==
William Foster is stuck in Los Angeles traffic on a hot day. After his air conditioning fails, he abandons his car and begins walking, carrying his briefcase.

At a convenience store, the Korean owner refuses to give change for a telephone call. Foster becomes agitated over the high prices. The owner grabs a baseball bat and demands that Foster leave. Foster takes the bat and destroys several merchandise displays before paying for a drink and leaving. Later, while resting on a hill, he is accosted by two Mexican gang members, who threaten him with a knife and demand his briefcase. Foster attacks them with the bat and takes their knife.

The gang members, now in a car with two associates, find Foster using a payphone. They open fire, killing four bystanders, but not Foster. The driver crashes. Foster picks up a weapon they had, shoots the surviving gang member in the leg, and then leaves with their bag of weapons. Foster encounters a panhandler who harasses him for change. Foster gives him the briefcase, which only contains his lunch.

At a fast-food restaurant, Foster attempts to order breakfast, but is told they have switched to the lunch menu. After an argument with the manager, Foster pulls a gun and fires into the ceiling accidentally. After trying to reassure the frightened employees and customers, he orders lunch, but is annoyed when the burger looks nothing like the one pictured. He leaves and tries to place a call from a phone booth, then shoots the booth to pieces after being hassled by someone who was waiting to use the phone. After Foster calls "home" again and states his intention to attend his daughter's birthday party, his ex-wife Beth notifies the police as she has a restraining order against him.

Sergeant Martin Prendergast, who is on his last day of duty (having been coaxed into retirement by his wife), insists on investigating the events. Interviews with witnesses lead Prendergast to suspect that the same person is responsible for all of them. Foster's vanity license plate, which read "D-FENS", proves to be an important lead, because Prendergast remembers being in the same traffic jam as Foster. Prendergast and his partner, Detective Sandra Torres, visit Foster's mother, who is surprised to learn that he lost his job. They realize Foster is heading toward his former family's home in Venice and rush to intercept him.

Foster passes a bank where a black man is protesting after being rejected for a loan. The man exchanges a glance with Foster and says, "Don't forget me," as police escort him away. Foster stops at a military surplus store to buy boots. The owner, a homophobic Neo-Nazi, diverts Torres when she comes in. After Torres leaves, the owner offers Foster a rocket launcher and congratulates him for the restaurant shooting incident. When Foster expresses distaste for the store owner's bigotry, the man becomes violent and attempts to turn him over to the police, but Foster stabs him then shoots him dead. Foster changes into tactical clothes, takes the rocket launcher, and leaves.

Foster encounters a road repair crew who are not working and accuses them of doing unnecessary repairs to justify their budget. He pulls out the rocket launcher but struggles to use it, until a boy explains how it works. Foster accidentally fires the launcher, blowing up the construction site. By the time Foster reaches Beth's house, she has already fled with their daughter. He realizes that they may have gone to the nearby Venice Pier, but Prendergast and Torres arrive before he can pursue them. Foster shoots Torres, injuring her, and flees with Prendergast in pursuit.

At the pier, Foster confronts his ex-wife and daughter. Adele is happy to see him, but Beth wants him to leave. Prendergast arrives and distracts Foster long enough for Beth to throw his gun into the ocean. Prendergast aims his gun at Foster and urges him to surrender, acknowledging his complaints about social inequalities but not accepting them as an excuse for his rampage. With nothing left for him, Foster tricks Prendergast into killing him. Having asserted himself, Prendergast decides to hold off retirement.

== Cast ==
- Michael Douglas as William Foster
- Robert Duvall as Martin Prendergast
- Barbara Hershey as Beth
- Rachel Ticotin as Sandra Torres
- Tuesday Weld as Amanda Prendergast
- Frederic Forrest as Nick, Surplus Store Owner
- Lois Smith as William Foster's Mother
- Joey Hope Singer as Adele Foster
- Michael Paul Chan as Mr. Lee
- Raymond J. Barry as Captain Bill Yardley
- D. W. Moffett as Detective Lydecker
- Steve Park as Detective Brian
- James Keane as Detective Keene
- Marlo Thomas as KTLA Reporter
- Karina Arroyave as Angie
- Dedee Pfeiffer as Miss Folsom
- Vondie Curtis-Hall as "Not Economically Viable" Man
- James Morrison as Construction Sign Man by Bus Stop
- John Diehl as Backyard Dad
- Amy Morton as Backyard Mom

== Production ==
=== Development ===
Falling Down was being filmed in various locations in Lynwood, California, when the 1992 Los Angeles riots began. By April 30, the riots were sufficiently disruptive to force filming to stop early that day. Film crews produced more footage inside of Warner Bros. Studios Burbank, as the riots continued. By May 4, when the crew intended to resume in Pasadena, initial requests to do so were denied, causing delays. Filming wrapped in late June 1992. Production designer Barbara Ling said: "We mapped this so that you really were going across Los Angeles from Silver Lake down to mid-city to Koreatown."

In an interview less than a week before Falling Down's release, screenwriter Ebbe Roe Smith gave his interpretation of what the movie was about. "To me, even though the movie deals with complicated urban issues, it really is just about one basic thing: The main character represents the old power structure of the U.S. that has now become archaic, and hopelessly lost. For both of them, it's adjust-or-die time ..."

According to Michael Douglas, the script was initially planned to be made into a television film.

=== Casting ===
Foster's signature haircut was the idea of Joel Schumacher and the movie's hairstylist, Lynda Gurasich. Douglas commented on how it helped him get into the character of a veteran of the military or defense industry: "It gave me the feeling of the late '50s and the early '60s, and somehow my character you kinda have the feeling that he came from another time, or he wished or he hoped for another time when things made sense." Douglas would add concerning the character: "There's a lot of people who are a paycheck away from being on the streets and being out of work who did everything right, they've been responsible, they tried hard, [and] they don't know what went wrong! We won the war, where's it all at?"

== Release ==
Falling Down premiered In New York and Los Angeles on February 26 1993.

=== Home media ===
The film was first released on VHS and then on DVD. Subsequently, the film was released by on a Limited Edition 4K Ultra HD Blu-ray and regular Blu-ray disc on July 20, 2026 by Arrow Films, with the same supplemental features as the previous version. It includes audio commentary and a 2009 interview with Douglas three new special features titled Man on the Edge an interview with screenwriter Ebbe Roe Smith, At War with the World an interview with composer James Newton Howard and Going Home, a location featurette revisiting the filmed sites with the remaining bonus features carrying over from previous versions.

== Reception ==
=== Box office ===
The film grossed $96 million against a $25 million budget. It took the top spot at the United States box office in its first two weeks of release (February 26–28 and March 5–7, 1993). Falling Down pushed the previous top movie, Groundhog Day, into the second place box-office spot for both those weeks. It grossed $40.9 million in the United States and Canada and $55.1 million internationally.

=== Critical reception ===
Falling Down holds an approval rating of 77% on Rotten Tomatoes based on 60 reviews, with an average rating of 6.90/10. The site's consensus states: "Falling Down's popcorn-friendly take on its complex themes proves disquieting—and ultimately fitting for a bleakly entertaining picture of one man's angry break with reality." The film has a weighted average score of 56 out of 100 on Metacritic based on 21 critics, indicating "mixed or average" reviews. Audiences surveyed by CinemaScore gave the film an average grade of "B" on an A+ to F scale.

==== Contemporary ====
Contemporary reviews of Falling Down were generally mixed to positive.

Vincent Canby of The New York Times called it "the most interesting, all-out commercial American film of the year to date, and one that will function much like a Rorschach test to expose the secrets of those who watch it." Philip Thomas of Empire praised "Douglas' hypnotic performance." Roger Ebert commended the film's depth, describing it as an exploration of "a great sadness, which turns into madness, and which can afflict anyone..." Writing for Rolling Stone, Peter Travers gave Falling Down four stars out of five, lauding Douglas's nuanced portrayal of a "shattered Everyman" in a film which "puts a human face on a cold statistic" of seemingly ordinary Americans "going berserk".

Other critics were more divided or critical. In The Washington Post, Hal Hinson noted the relatable premise but argued that the Schumacher wants Foster "to be a hero and a villain, and it just won't work." Kenneth Turan of the Los Angeles Times criticized the film's "shallowness", arguing that it indulges "a gloating sense that we the long-suffering victims are finally getting our splendid revenge." James Berardinelli noted its gallows humor, calling it close to a black comedy, while Mick LaSalle of the San Francisco Chronicle said it was an "...a film too good and too original to win any Oscars, but one bound to be remembered in years to come as a true and ironic statement about life in our time".

At the time of its release, Douglas's father, actor Kirk Douglas, declared: "He played it brilliantly. I think it is his best piece of work to date." He also defended the film against critics who claimed that it glorifies lawbreaking: "Michael's character is not the 'hero' or 'newest urban icon'. He is the villain and the victim. Of course, we see many elements of our society that contributed to his madness. We even pity him. But the movie never condones his actions."

Falling Down was released in theatres less than one year after the 1992 Los Angeles riots, during which Korean Americans and their businesses were targeted by rioters. The Korean American Coalition and Korean Grocers Association protested the film for its treatment of minorities, especially the Korean grocer. Warner Bros. Korea cancelled the release of Falling Down in South Korea following boycott threats. The outcry by the Grocers Association led to Michael Douglas meeting with the organization's members at the Warner Bros. Studio because they "were there and they were pissed. So we had a conversation and I told them, 'Look, I'm very sorry, but there's a reason the screenwriter picked certain things to put in the film.'" Unemployed defense workers were also angered at their portrayal in the film.

The character of D‑FENS was featured on magazine covers, including the March 29, 1993, issue of Newsweek, and reported upon as an embodiment of the "angry white man" stereotype. In 2014, WhatCulture included Michael Douglas' role in top "10 Most Convincing Movie Psychopath Performances".

==== Retrospective ====
In 2017, film critic April Wolfe wrote in LA Weekly that Falling Down "remains one of Hollywood's most overt yet morally complex depictions of the modern white-victimization narrative." In 2012, Tasha Robinson of The A.V. Club called it a "profoundly hateful film".

=== Accolades ===
- 1993 Cannes Film Festival, Nominated for the Palme d'Or (Joel Schumacher)
- 1994 Edgar Award, Won for Best Motion Picture Screenplay (Ebbe Roe Smith)

== In other media ==
=== Music ===
Falling Down has been the inspiration of musical artists such as Iron Maiden, Foo Fighters, Front Line Assembly and Heart Attack Man.

The Iron Maiden song "Man on the Edge" is a basic summary of Falling Down, beginning with describing the opening traffic jam, and ending with describing the birthday present Foster buys for his daughter.

The Foo Fighters' song "Walk" has a music video that is a recreation of scenes from Falling Down.

The Front Line Assembly album Millennium contains several samples from various scenes from Falling Down.

The Heart Attack Man song "Out For Blood" was inspired by the anger and frustration weaved through Falling Down which weaves through the rest of their album Fake Blood.

Death metal band Internal Bleeding sampled the same scene in their song "Falling Down," named after the film, from their album Driven to Conquer.

In the song "I'm in It", Kanye West refers to the film when he raps: "Time to take it too far now/Michael Douglas out the car now".

Finnish band Beats and Styles referred to the movie poster with DJ Control holding a baseball bat instead of a shotgun for the cover of their 2009 album Schizosonics.

=== Animation ===
An episode of the animated series Duckman titled "A Room with a Bellevue" (episode six of season three), is loosely based on the plot of Falling Down. Duckman has to pick up his new suit from the dry cleaner to be presentable on his children's birthday, but huge traffic and the law are going to stop him.

Frank Grimes, a one-off character on The Simpsons episode "Homer's Enemy", is modeled after Foster, having the same flat-top haircut, white shirt-and-tie, and briefcase.

=== Video games ===
In the video game Tony Hawk's American Wasteland, a character resembling Foster tasks the player with disrupting the workers at a construction site, then uses a rocket launcher to destroy it.

== See also ==
- List of films featuring psychopaths and sociopaths
