= Herschel Weingrod =

American screenwriter (born 1947)

Herschel Alan Weingrod (born October 30, 1947) is an American screenwriter. He has written and co-written a number of Hollywood films, including Trading Places, Twins, Kindergarten Cop, and Space Jam with fellow writer Timothy Harris.

== Early life and education ==
Born in Milwaukee, Wisconsin, in 1947 Weingrod teamed up with British American writer Timothy Harris early in his career. Together, they formed Weingrod/Harris Productions. Weingrod earned his bachelor's degree in European history at the University of Wisconsin–Madison. He is also a graduate of the London Film School.

== Filmography ==
=== As writer ===
- Cheaper to Keep Her (1981)
- Trading Places (1983)
- Brewster's Millions (1985)
- Lifted (1988)
- Twins (1988)
- My Stepmother Is an Alien (1988)
- Kindergarten Cop (1990)
- Pure Luck (1991)
- Lift (1991)
- Space Jam (1996)
- Kindergarten Cop 2 (2016) - screenplay

=== As producer ===
- Falling Down (1993)
