= Cheaper to Keep Her (film) =

- Theatrical release poster
- Directed by: Ken Annakin
- Written by: Timothy Harris; Herschel Weingrod
- Produced by: Lenny Isenberg
- Starring: Mac Davis; Tovah Feldshuh; Priscilla Lopez; Jack Gilford; Rose Marie; Art Metrano
- Cinematography: Roland 'Ozzie' Smith
- Edited by: Edward Warschilka
- Music by: Dick Halligan
- Production company: Regal
- Distributed by: American Cinema Releasing
- Release date: March 13, 1981
- Running time: 92 minutes
- Country: United States
- Language: English
- Box office: $2.4 million

Cheaper to Keep Her is a 1981 American comedy film directed by Ken Annakin, which starred singer-turned-actor Mac Davis alongside Tovah Feldshuh.

== Plot ==
William "Bill" Dekker is a newly divorced swinger who goes to work for an attorney named K. D. Locke as an investigator. His assignments have him tracking down divorced men who have reneged on their alimony and child support payments, a twist of irony considering not only his chauvinistic tendencies, but also the fact that he himself is relying on the money he receives from his assignments to cover his own alimony payments. The film takes its title from the song of the same name, which can be heard over the opening credits.

== Cast ==
- Mac Davis as Bill Dekker
- Tovah Feldshuh as Katherine D. Locke
- Art Metrano as Tony Turino
- Priscilla Lopez as Theresa
- Ian McShane as Dr. Alfred Sunshine
- Rose Marie as Ida Bracken
- Jack Gilford as Stanley Bracken
- Gwen Humble as Laura
- J. Pat O'Malley as Landlord
- Dub Taylor as Harvey
- Shannon Wilcox as Nora
- Chuck Hicks as Abe
- Bruce Flanders as Leon
- Joe Regalbuto as Chuck
- Rod McCary as Brownmiller
- Steve Gagnon as Peter
- Anne Ramsey as Woman in Curlers
- Juanin Clay as Receptionist
- Gloria LeRoy as Ethel
- Wallace Shawn as Mugger
- Gina Gallego as Sister #1
- Ruth Ann Llorens as Sister #2
- Caroline Lagerfelt as Ex-Wife
- Patrick Gorman as Waiter
- Russ McCubbin as Man on Toilet

== Critical reception ==
Critical reaction to the film has been overwhelmingly negative. Leonard Maltin rated it a BOMB, while the reviewing duo of Mick Martin and Marsha Porter labeled it a turkey. Gene Siskel, who registered the film for a "Dog of the Week" segment on PBS' Sneak Previews, called it "a pathetic comedy" with misleading advertising, adding:

The comedy is lame, the sex is childish, and the only reason the film has an "R" rating is because of a single swear word. Cheaper to Keep Her is a cheaply made, sloppily photographed comedy that isn't even on a par with the few made-for-TV movies I've seen. It should disappear from town in a week.
