= Choi Seong-woo =

South Korean voice actor

Choi Seong-woo (Korean: 최성우; born June 25, 1954) is a South Korean voice actress who joined the voice acting division of Munhwa Broadcasting Corporation in 1976. Currently, Choi is cast in the Korea TV Edition of CSI: Crime Scene Investigation as Catherine Willows, replacing Marg Helgenberger.

== Roles ==
=== Broadcast television ===
- CSI: Crime Scene Investigation (replacing Marg Helgenberger, Korea TV Edition, MBC)

=== Film dubbing ===
- Charlie's Angels (replacing Kelly Lynch, Korea TV Edition, SBS)
- Lethal Weapon 3 (replacing Rene Russo, Korea TV Edition, MBC)
- Home Alone and Home Alone 2: Lost in New York (replacing Catherine O'Hara, Korea TV Edition, MBC)
- Random Hearts (replacing Kristin Scott Thomas, Korea TV Edition, MBC)
- In the Line of Fire (replacing Rene Russo, Korea TV Edition, MBC)
- My Stepmother Is an Alien (replacing Kim Basinger, Korea TV Edition, MBC)
- Postcards from the Edge (replacing Meryl Streep, Korea TV Edition, MBC)

== Homepage ==
- MBC Voice Acting Division Choi Seong-woo Blog (in Korean)
