= Nuts (play) =

1979 play by Tom Topor

- Original language: English
- Written by: Tom Topor
- Subject: A prostitute indicted for manslaughter is determined to prove she is sane enough to stand trial
- Genre: Drama

Premiere
- Date: 1979
- Place: WPA Theater; New York City
- Directed by: Steve Zuckerman

Nuts is a 1979 play by Tom Topor. The play is a courtroom drama, suspense, and psychological drama which explores issues of sexual abuse, family and social power dynamics, and aspects of the criminal court system. It was adapted into a film of the same name in 1987, starring Barbra Streisand and Richard Dreyfuss.

== Plot ==
When strong-willed, high-class call girl Claudia Draper is indicted for manslaughter in the first degree after killing a client in self-defense, her mother Rose and stepfather Arthur attempt to have her declared mentally incompetent, which would prevent a trial and cause Claudia to be institutionalized. Public defender Aaron Levinsky is assigned to her case, but Claudia is angry and distrustful of everybody, and she resists his help, disrupting both her examinations by psychiatrist Herbert Rosenthal and her court hearings. As findings progress, new insights into Claudia's entire life experience, including sexual abuse by her stepfather, begin to surface. In the end, Claudia is free to stand trial and deemed not guilty by way of self-defense.

== Background ==
Nuts takes place in the courtroom in the psychiatric wing of Bellevue Hospital in New York City. Tom Torpor used his years of experience as a journalist covering New York City police stations, courtrooms, hospitals, and psychiatric wards in crafting the play. He derived the mental illness plot from a true-life incident he had reported in the early 1970s, and he also questioned his wife about her incestuous childhood, which provided the lead character's motivation to become a prostitute.

== Production ==
Nuts was produced in an early draft form at the Off-Off Broadway WPA Theater in 1979. Universal Studios purchased the film rights and financed the play's move to Broadway. Following eight previews, it opened at the Biltmore Theatre on April 28, 1980, where it ran for 96 performances and closed on July 20. Directed by Stephen Zuckerman, who had directed the original production, it starred Anne Twomey as Claudia, Richard Zobel as Aaron Levinsky, Hansford Rowe as Arthur Kirk, Lenka Peterson as Rose Kirk, Paul Stolarsky as Dr. Rosenthal, and Ed Van Nuys as Judge Murdoch.

Anne Twomey won the Theatre World Award and was nominated for the Tony Award for Best Performance by a Leading Actress in a Play, and Hansford Rowe was nominated for the Drama Desk Award for Outstanding Featured Actor in a Play.

== Film adaptation ==
Topor, Darryl Ponicsan, and Alvin Sargent adapted the play for the 1987 film of the same title, directed by Martin Ritt and starring Barbra Streisand and Richard Dreyfuss.
