= Richard Bauer =

American actor

- Born: March 14, 1939; St. Louis, Missouri, United States
- Died: March 1, 1999 (age 59); Washington, D.C., United States

Richard Bauer (March 14, 1939 – March 1, 1999) was an American actor. He won an Obie Award in 1978 for his performances in Landscape of the Body and The Dybbuk.

== Filmography ==
Year	Title	Role	Notes
1986	The Imagemaker	Morris Brodkin	
1986	Good to Go	Editor	
1987	The Sicilian	Hector Adonis	
1993	The Pelican Brief	Managing Editor	
1996	The Sunchaser	Dr. Bradford	
1997	Shadow Conspiracy	Grolier	
1998	Sleeping Dogs Lie	Reporter #1	
1999	Pushing Tin	Pilot	Voice
2003	Crime Spree	Man on Phone	(final film role)

== Awards ==
Year	Award	Work
1978	Obie Award	Landscape of the Body
1978	Obie Award	The Dybbuk
