= Martin Ritt =

American film and theatre director (1914–1990)

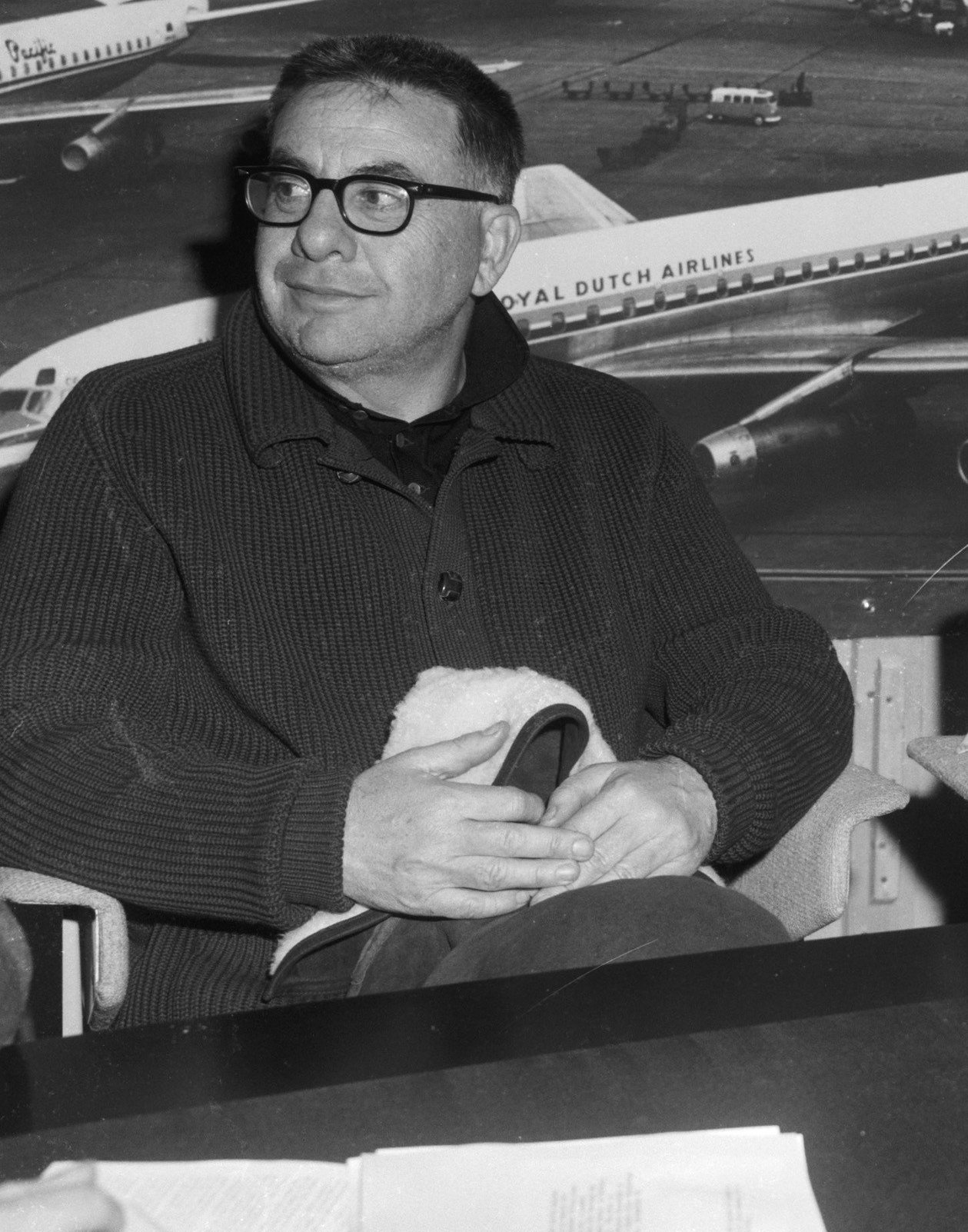
- Ritt in 1965
- Born: March 2, 1914; New York City, New York, U.S.
- Died: December 8, 1990 (aged 76); Santa Monica, California, U.S.
- Occupations: Director; producer; actor
- Years active: 1950–1990
- Spouse: Adele Ritt (m. 1942)
- Children: 2

Martin Ritt (March 2, 1914 – December 8, 1990) was an American director, producer, and actor, active in film, theatre, and television. He was known mainly as an auteur of socially conscious dramas and literary adaptations, described by Stanley Kauffmann as "one of the most underrated American directors, superbly competent and quietly imaginative."

Ritt was an actor-turned-director with the Federal Theater Project and Group Theatre, becoming assistant to Elia Kazan at the Actors Studio. After a promising television directing career was cut short by the Second Red Scare, Ritt made his first film, Edge of the City (1957). His 1958 film The Long, Hot Summer, based on three works by William Faulkner, was nominated for the Palme d'Or at the Cannes Film Festival. This was the first of three times that the director would be nominated for the honor.

His 1963 film Hud earned him an Academy Award nomination for Best Director, and his 1965 John le Carré adaptation The Spy Who Came in from the Cold won the BAFTA Award for Best British Film. Two of his subsequent films, Sounder (1972) and Norma Rae (1979), were both nominated for Best Picture Oscars. Ritt directed many of the biggest stars of his time, including 13 of them to Academy Award wins or nominations - Paul Newman, Melvyn Douglas, Patricia Neal, Richard Burton, James Earl Jones, Jane Alexander, Paul Winfield, Cicely Tyson, Geraldine Page, Sally Field, Rip Torn, Alfre Woodard and James Garner.

Four of his films (Edge of the City, Hud, Sounder, and Norma Rae) have been selected for the National Film Registry by the Library of Congress as being "culturally, historically or aesthetically" significant.

== Early years and influences ==
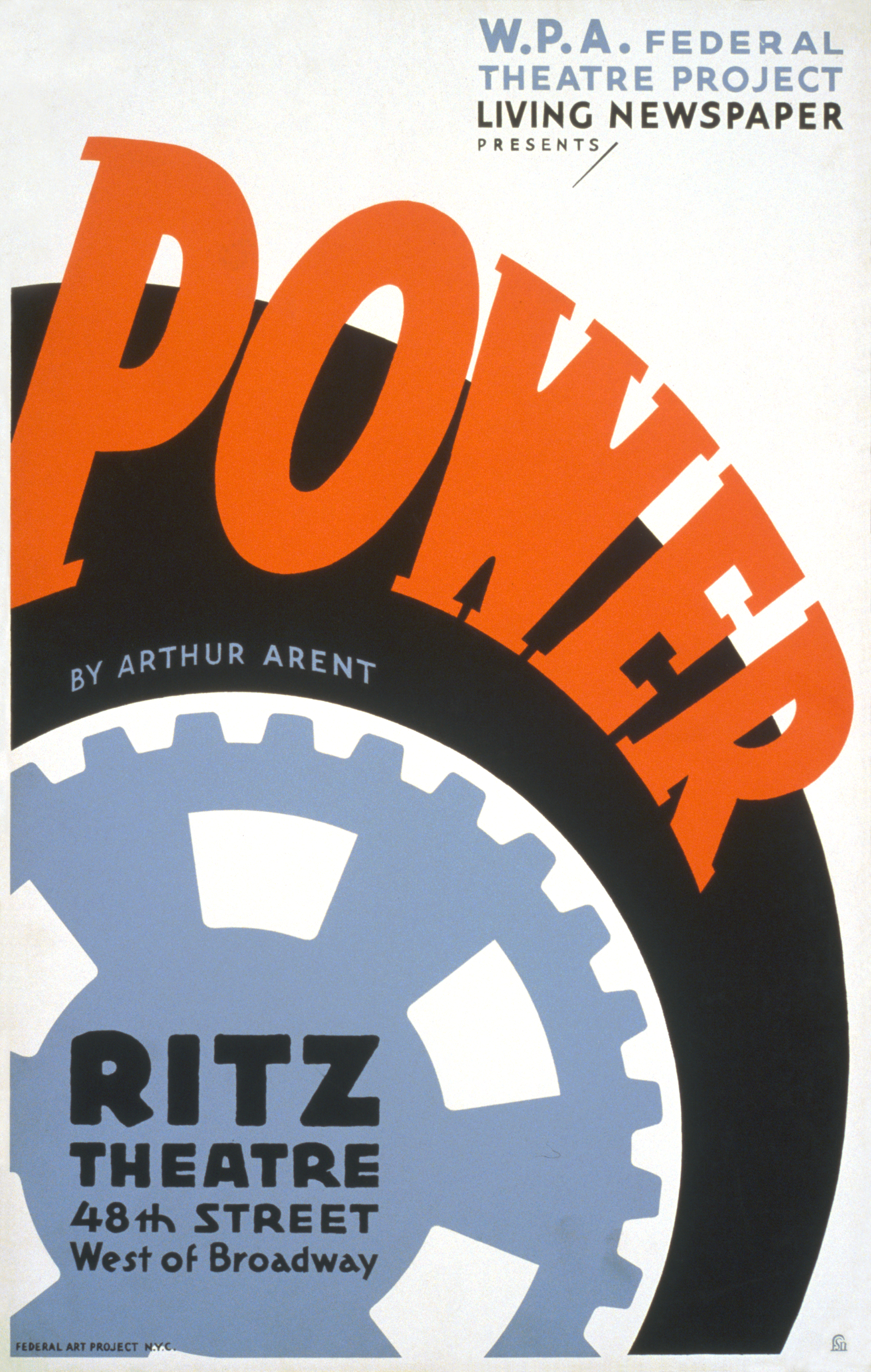
Poster for Power, a Living Newspaper play for the Federal Theatre Project (1937)

Ritt was born to a Jewish family in Manhattan, the son of immigrant parents. He graduated from DeWitt Clinton High School in the Bronx.

Ritt originally attended and played football for Elon College in North Carolina. The stark contrasts of the depression-era South, against his New York City upbringing, instilled in him a passion for expressing the struggles of inequality, which is apparent in the films he directed.

=== Early theatre ===
After leaving St. John's University, Ritt found work with a theater group, and began acting in plays. His first performance was as Crown in Porgy and Bess. After his performance drew favorable reviews, Ritt concluded that he could "only be happy in the theater."

Ritt was hired as a playwright for the Roosevelt administration's New Deal Works Progress Administration with the Federal Theater Project, a federal government-funded theater support program. With work hard to find, social inequality obvious, and the Depression in full effect, many WPA theater performers, directors, and writers were influenced by the radical left and Communism. Ritt was among them. Years later, he stated that he had never been a member of the Communist Party, but he had considered himself a leftist and found common ground with some Marxist principles.

=== Group Theatre ===
Ritt joined the Theater of Arts, then the Group Theatre in New York City. There, he met Elia Kazan, who cast Ritt as an understudy to his play Golden Boy. Ritt continued his association with Kazan for well over a decade, later assisting—and sometimes filling in for—Kazan at The Actors Studio. He eventually became one of the Studio's few non-performing life members.

=== World War II ===
During World War II, Ritt served with the U.S. Army Air Forces and appeared as an actor in the Air Forces' Broadway play and film adaptation Winged Victory.

During the Broadway run of the play, Ritt directed a production of Sidney Kingsley's play Yellow Jack, using actors from Winged Victory. They rehearsed between midnight and 3 am after the Winged Victory performances.

The play had a brief Broadway run and was performed again in Los Angeles when the Winged Victory troupe moved there to make the film version.

== Television and the Blacklist ==
The May 7, 1948, issue of the Counterattack newsletter

After working as a playwright with the WPA, acting on stage, and directing hundreds of plays, Ritt became a successful television director and producer. He produced and directed episodes of Danger, Somerset Maugham TV Theatre (1950–51), Starlight Theatre (1951), and The Plymouth Playhouse (1953).

=== Blacklist ===
In 1952, Ritt was caught up by the Red Scare and investigations of communist influence in Hollywood and the movie industry. Although not directly named by the House Un-American Activities Committee (HUAC), Ritt was mentioned in an anticommunist newsletter called Counterattack, published by American Business Consultants, a group formed by three former FBI agents.

Counterattack alleged that Ritt had helped Communist Party-affiliated locals of the New York-based Retail, Wholesale and Department Store Union stage their annual show. Also cited was a show he had directed for Russian War Relief at Madison Square Garden. His associations with the Group Theater, founded on a Russian model, and the Federal Theater Project (which Congress had stopped funding in 1939 because of what some anti-New Deal congressmen claimed to be a left-wing political tone to some productions), were also known to HUAC. He was finally blacklisted by the television industry when a Syracuse grocer charged him with donating money to Communist China in 1951. He supported himself for five years by teaching at the Actors Studio.

== Career in Hollywood ==
=== Edge of the City ===
Unable to work in the television industry, Ritt returned to the theater for several years. By 1956, the Red Scare had decreased in intensity, and he turned to film directing. His first film as director was Edge of the City (1957), an important film for Ritt and an opportunity to give voice to his experiences. Based on the story of a union dock worker who faces intimidation by a corrupt boss, the film incorporates many themes that were to influence Ritt over the years: corruption, racism, intimidation of the individual by the group, defense of the individual against government oppression, and most notably, the redeeming quality of mercy and the value of shielding others from evil, even at the cost of sacrificing one's own reputation, career, or life.

=== Joanne Woodward and Paul Newman ===
Ritt went on to direct 25 more films. Producer Jerry Wald signed him to direct No Down Payment (1957) with Joanne Woodward. Wald later used Ritt on two adaptations of William Faulkner novels, both with Woodward: The Long, Hot Summer (1958) with Paul Newman, a big hit, and The Sound and the Fury (1959) with Yul Brynner, a flop. In between, he directed The Black Orchid (1958) at Paramount and 5 Branded Women (1960) in Europe.

Ritt directed Paris Blues (1961) with Woodward and Newman. He made one more film with Wald, Hemingway's Adventures of a Young Man (1962), in which Newman played a supporting role. Ritt and Newman's next collaboration was 1963's Hud, starring Newman as the eponymous character. The film was a major financial success, and both men received Academy Award Nominations. It was also the first of four films that James Wong Howe would shoot for Ritt, and the second film for which he would win an Academy Award for Best Black-and-White Cinematography. The duo's fifth film together, The Outrage (1964), is an American retelling of the Kurosawa film Rashomon starring Newman, Laurence Harvey, Claire Bloom, Edward G. Robinson, Howard da Silva, and William Shatner, and reuniting the pair with Howe. Like Kurosawa's film, Ritt employed a flashback structure in his film, and Newman traveled to Mexico and spent time speaking to local residents to study the accents. In spite of the pair's creative efforts, the film did not find the same success that Hud had had. However, their next collaboration, Hombre (1967), was a major financial success, but would prove to be the last film Ritt made with Newman.

During this period, Ritt branched out by directing The Spy Who Came in from the Cold (1965) with Richard Burton, a Cold War thriller based on the John le Carré novel. He ended the '60s with the Kirk Douglas-starring mafia film The Brotherhood (1968).

=== 1970s ===
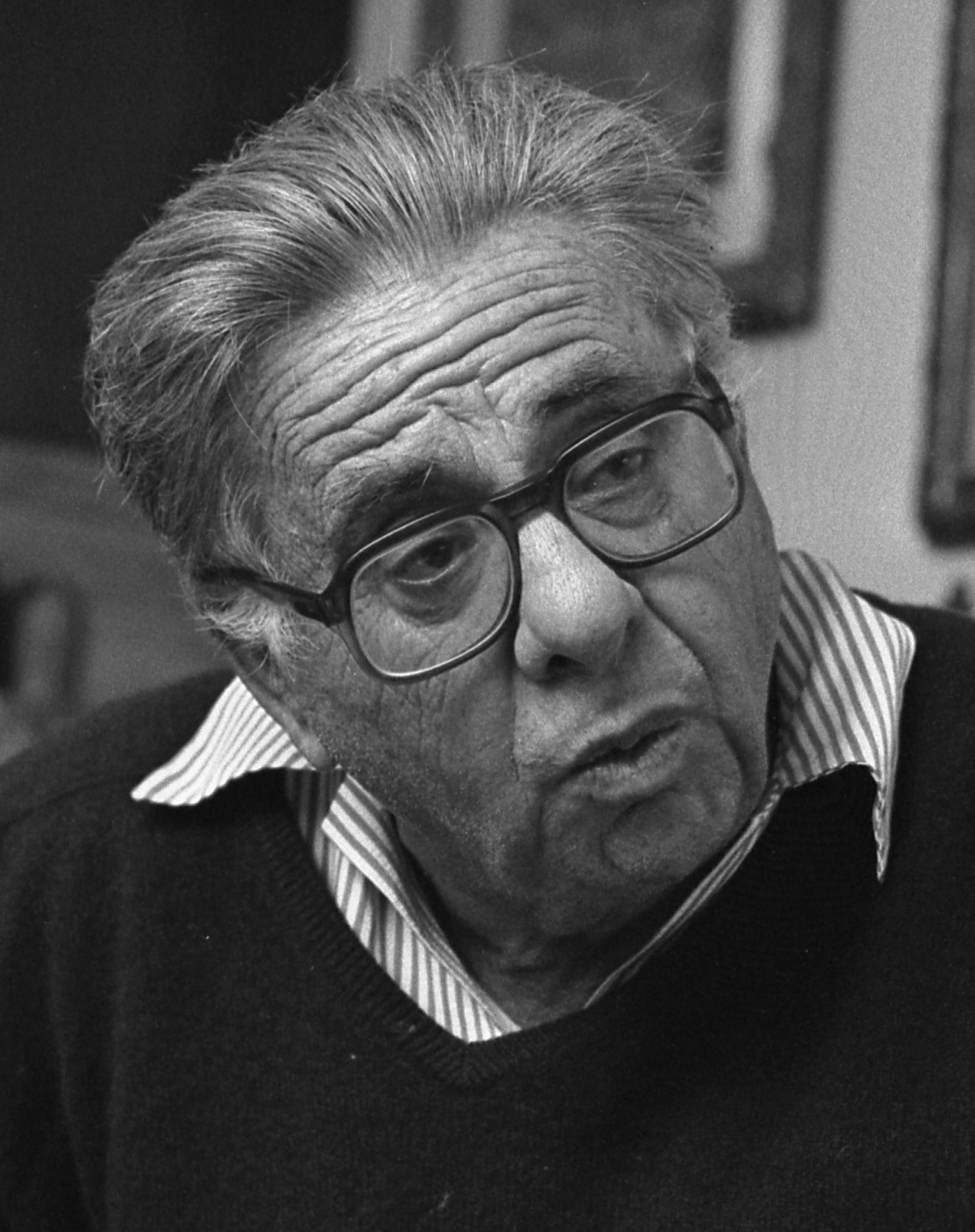
Ritt in 1979.

In the 1970s, Ritt won acclaim for movies such as The Molly Maguires (1970), The Great White Hope (1970) (earning Oscar nominations for James Earl Jones and Jane Alexander), Sounder (1972), Pete 'n' Tillie (1972), and Conrack (1974) (from Pat Conroy's autobiographical novel). He also made a return to acting, playing Uncle Morty in a PBS production of Awake and Sing! and Hans Bärlach in End of the Game.

After Warner Bros. Pictures bought the film rights to First Blood in 1973 Ritt was hired to direct from a screenplay by Walter Newman, featuring Paul Newman as John Rambo and Robert Mitchum as Sheriff Will Teasle. However his version of the film was not made.

In 1976, Ritt made one of the first dramatic feature films about the blacklist, The Front, starring Woody Allen. The Front satirizes the use of "fronts", men and women who (either as a personal favor or in exchange for payment) allowed their names to be listed as writers for scripts actually authored by blacklisted writers. The film was based on the experiences of, and written by, one of Ritt's closest friends, screenwriter Walter Bernstein, who was blacklisted for eight years beginning in 1950.

Ritt ended the decade by directing Casey's Shadow (1978), starring his Awake and Sing! co-star Walter Matthau, and Norma Rae (1979), which won Sally Field her first Oscar for Best Actress.

=== Final Films ===
Ritt directed Field in two more films: Back Roads (1981) and Murphy's Romance (1985). Between these two films he also directed Cross Creek (1983) about Marjorie Kinnan Rawlings, author of The Yearling. It was nominated for (but did not win) four Oscars, including Best Supporting Actress Alfre Woodard and Best Supporting Actor Rip Torn.

In 1987, Ritt again used extensive flashback and nonlinear storytelling techniques in the film Nuts, based on the stage play of the same name, written by Tom Topor. The film was considered a box-office disappointment in relation to its budget, although it did not actually lose money.

Ritt's final film was Stanley & Iris (1990).

== Personal life ==
Ritt and his wife Adele had a daughter, film producer Martina Wernerand, and a son, Michael.

=== Death ===
Ritt died of heart disease at age 76 in Santa Monica, California, on December 8, 1990.

== Filmography ==
=== Film ===
Year	Title	Functioned as	
Year	Title	Direction	Producer
1957	Edge of the City	Yes	No
1957	No Down Payment	Yes	No
1958	The Long Hot Summer	Yes	No
1958	The Black Orchid	Yes	No
1959	The Sound and the Fury	Yes	No
1960	5 Branded Women	Yes	No
1961	Paris Blues	Yes	No
1962	Hemingway's Adventures of a Young Man	Yes	No
1963	Hud	Yes	Yes
1964	The Outrage	Yes	Yes
1965	The Spy Who Came in from the Cold	Yes	Yes
1967	Hombre	Yes	Yes
1968	The Brotherhood	Yes	No
1970	The Great White Hope	Yes	No
1970	The Molly Maguires	Yes	Yes
1972	Sounder	Yes	No
1972	Pete 'n' Tillie	Yes	No
1974	Conrack	Yes	Yes
1976	The Front	Yes	Yes
1978	Casey's Shadow	Yes	No
1979	Norma Rae	Yes	No
1981	Back Roads	Yes	No
1983	Cross Creek	Yes	Yes
1985	Murphy's Romance	Yes	No
1987	Nuts	Yes	Yes
1990	Stanley & Iris	Yes	No

==== Acting roles ====
Year	Title	Role	Notes
1944	Winged Victory	Gleason	Credited as “PFC. Martin Ritt”
1975	End of the Game	Hans Barlach	
1979	Norma Rae	Factory Worker	Uncredited
1985	The Slugger's Wife	Burly De Vito	

=== Television ===
Year	Title	Functioned as		Notes
Year	Title	Directior	Producer	Notes
1949	The Billy Bean Show	Yes	No	Episode #1.1
1950	Danger	No	Yes	2 episode
1950–51	Somerset Maugham TV Theatre	Yes	Yes	Director (4 episodes); Producer (3 episodes)
1951	Starlight Theatre	Yes	No	Director (2 episodes); Producer (9 episodes)
1953	ABC Album	Yes	No	Episode "The Split Second"
1957	The Alcoa Hour	Yes	No	Episode "No License to Kill"

==== Acting roles ====
Year	Title	Role	Notes
1951–52	Danger		6 episodes
1952	CBS Television Workshop		Episode "Rocket"
1952	City Hospital		Episode "Angel in the Infield"
1954	High Tension		Episode "The Pulse of Murder"
1954	Spotlight		5 episodes
1954	Frontiers of Faith		Episode "The Last Rabbi"
1956	Robert Montgomery Presents	Hugo Green	Episode "Aftermath"
1972	Awake and Sing!	Uncle Morty	TV movie

== Partial stage credits ==
Year	Title	Functioned as		Venue	Notes
Year	Title	Director	Other	Venue	Notes
1944	Yellow Jack	Yes	No	44th Street Theatre, New York	Credited as 'PFC. Martin Ritt'
1946	Mr. Peebles and Mr. Hooker	Yes	No	Music Box Theatre, New York	
1947	Yellow Jack	Yes	No	International Theatre, New York	
1948	David's Crown	No	Yes	Broadway Theatre, New York	Production supervisor
1948	Set My People Free	Yes	No	Hudson Theatre, New York	
1950	The Man	Yes	No	Fulton Theatre, New York	
1950	Cry of the Peacock	Yes	No	Mansfield Theatre, New York	
1955–56	A View from the Bridge	Yes	No	Coronet Theatre, New York	
1955–56	A Memory of Two Mondays	Yes	No	Coronet Theatre, New York	
1956	A Very Special Baby	Yes	No	Playhouse Theatre, New York	

==== Acting roles ====
Year	Title	Role	Venue	Notes
1937–38	Golden Boy	Sam	Belasco Theatre, New York	Also assist. stage manager
1939	The Gentle People	Polack	Belasco Theatre, New York	
1940	Two On An Island	Samuel Brodsky	Broadhurst Theatre, New York	
1940	Two On An Island	Samuel Brodsky	Hudson Theatre, New York	
1942	They Should Have Stood in Bed	2nd Man	Mansfield Theatre, New York	
1942–43	The Eve of St. Mark	Pvt. Glinka	Cort Theatre, New York	
1943–44	Winged Victory	Gleason	44th Street Theatre, New York	Credited as 'PFC. Martin Ritt'
1953	Maya	Ernest	Theatre de Lys, New York	
1953	Men of Distinction	August Volpone	48th Street Theatre, New York	
1954–55	The Flowering Peach	Shem	Belasco Theatre, New York	

== Awards and honors ==
Institution	Year	Category	Work	Result
Academy Awards	1964	Best Director	Hud	Nominated
British Academy Film Awards	1967	Best Film	The Spy Who Came In from the Cold	Won
British Academy Film Awards	1967	Outstanding British Film	The Spy Who Came In from the Cold	Nominated
Cannes Film Festival	1958	Palme d'Or	The Long, Hot Summer	Nominated
Cannes Film Festival	1979	Palme d'Or	Norma Rae	Nominated
Cannes Film Festival	1979	Technical Grand Prize	Norma Rae	Won
Cannes Film Festival	1983	Palme d'Or	Cross Creek	Nominated
Directors Guild of America	1959	Outstanding Directorial Achievement in Theatrical Feature Film	The Long, Hot Summer	Nominated
Directors Guild of America	1964	Outstanding Directorial Achievement in Theatrical Feature Film	Hud	Nominated
Directors Guild of America	1973	Outstanding Directorial Achievement in Theatrical Feature Film	Sounder	Nominated
Golden Globe Awards	1963	Best Director	Hemingway's Adventures of a Young Man	Nominated
Golden Globe Awards	1964	Best Director	Hud	Nominated
Karlovy Vary International Film Festival	1962	Crystal Globe	Hemingway's Adventures of a Young Man	Nominated
New York Film Critics Circle	1963	Best Director	Hud	2nd place
Valladolid International Film Festival	1974	Golden Spike	Pete 'n' Tillie	Nominated
Valladolid International Film Festival	1977	Golden Spike	The Front	Nominated
Venice Film Festival	1958	Golden Lion	The Black Orchid	Nominated
Venice Film Festival	1963	Golden Lion	Hud	Nominated
Venice Film Festival	1963	OCIC Award	Hud	Won

=== Awards and nominations received by Ritt's films ===
Year	Film Feature	Oscars		BAFTAs		Golden Globes	
Year	Film Feature	Nominations	Wins	Nominations	Wins	Nominations	Wins
1957	Edge of the City			2			
1957	No Down Payment			2			
1961	Paris Blues	1					
1962	Hemingway's Adventures of a Young Man					5	
1963	Hud	7	3	3	1	5	
1965	The Spy Who Came In from the Cold	2		6	4	1	1
1970	The Molly Maguires	1					
1970	The Great White Hope	2				3	1
1972	Sounder	4		2		2	
1972	Pete 'n' Tillie	2		1	1	3	
1974	Conrack			1	1		
1976	The Front	1		1		1	
1979	Norma Rae	4	2			3	1
1983	Cross Creek	4					
1985	Murphy's Romance	2				2	
1987	Nuts					3	
Total		30	5	18	7	28	3

Oscar-related Performances

Under Ritt's direction, these actors have received Oscar nominations and wins for their performances in their respective roles.

Year	Performer	Feature Film	Result
Best Actor in Lead Performance
1964	Paul Newman	Hud	Nominated
1966	Richard Burton	The Spy Who Came In from the Cold	Nominated
1971	James Earl Jones	The Great White Hope	Nominated
1973	Paul Winfield	Sounder	Nominated
1986	James Garner	Murphy's Romance	Nominated
Best Actress in Lead Performance
1964	Patricia Neal	Hud	Won
1971	Jane Alexander	The Great White Hope	Nominated
1973	Cicely Tyson	Sounder	Nominated
1980	Sally Field	Norma Rae	Won
Best Actor in Supporting Performance
1964	Melvyn Douglas	Hud	Won
1984	Rip Torn	Cross Creek	Nominated
Best Actress in Supporting Performance
1973	Geraldine Page	Pete 'n' Tillie	Nominated
1984	Alfre Woodard	Cross Creek	Nominated

== See also ==
- Harriet Frank Jr. and Irving Ravetch, a screenwriting couple with whom Ritt collaborated extensively.
