= Judgment (1990 film) =

1990 television film directed by Tom Topor

- Genre: Drama
- Written by: Tom Topor
- Directed by: Tom Topor
- Starring: Keith Carradine; Blythe Danner; Jack Warden; David Strathairn; Michael Faustino
- Music by: Cliff Eidelman
- Country of origin: United States
- Original language: English

Production
- Executive producer: Steve Tisch
- Producer: Rob Hershman
- Cinematography: Elemer Ragalyi
- Editor: Cynthia Scheider
- Running time: 90 minutes
- Production company: HBO Pictures

Original release
- Network: HBO
- Release: October 13, 1990

Judgment is an HBO television film. It was first broadcast on October 13, 1990, and was written and directed by Tom Topor. The film's tagline is "No one stands beyond the reach of the law, not even the Church."

== Plot ==
The sexual abuse of minors by priests is the delicate issue to be handled by Peter and Emmeline Guitry, devout Catholics in a small town in Louisiana whose lives are shattered when their son Robbie reveals that he has been sexually abused by their priest, Father Frank Aubert. Along with other parents in the parish, they begin a persistent but painful campaign to remove Aubert from the clergy, and have him prosecuted as a sex offender. The Catholic Church attempts to cover up the abuse and place Aubert back in the parish, causing a nationally publicized lawsuit.

== Cast ==
- Keith Carradine as Pete Guitry
- Blythe Danner as Emmeline Guitry
- Jack Warden as Claude Fortier
- David Strathairn as Father Frank Aubert
- Michael Faustino as Robbie Guitry
- Crystal McKellar as Sabine Guitry
- Bob Gunton as Monsignor Beauvais
- Dylan Baker as Father Delambre
- Mitchell Ryan as Dave Davis
- Robert Joy as Mr. Hummel
- Steve Hofvendahl as Daniel Broussard
- Mary Joy as Madeleine Broussard
- Kimberli Bronson as Miss Haver

== Reception ==
Washington Post movie critic Tom Shales called the film "a competent, compelling docudrama, but also one of those squirm-inducing films that seem, when it's all over, not worth the discomfort." Chris Willman of the Los Angeles Times wrote: "Ultimately 'Judgment' stops a little short of the judgments it seems prepared to make..." The Baltimore Sun's Steve McKerrow concluded, "the film grapples pretty well with its troubling topic."

Kenneth R. Clark, writing in the Chicago Tribune, talked with the film's producer, Rob Hershman about the story's origins. In 1984, Hershman found a one paragraph newspaper summary of Louisiana priest Gilbert Gauthe's plea agreement and chose to cover the story on the CBS News news program West 57th Street. Tom Topor, who had previously written about rape in The Accused and about pedophilia in Nuts chose to write the screenplay about a fictional character similar to Gauthe and direct the project for HBO Films. Clark neither praised the film nor panned it, but pointed out "only HBO, with no advertisers to worry about and no public pressure groups to appease, would dare to run it."

== Awards ==
- The director and writer Tom Topor won the Writers Guild of America award for his work on Judgment.
