= Alvin Sargent =

American screenwriter (1927–2019)

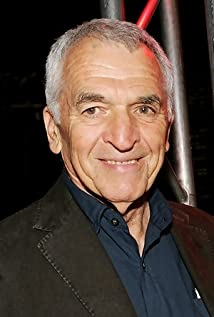
- Born: Alvin Supowitz; April 12, 1927; Philadelphia, Pennsylvania, U.S.
- Died: May 9, 2019 (aged 92); Seattle, Washington, U.S.
- Occupation: Screenwriter
- Years active: 1956–2012
- Spouses: Joan Camden (m. 1953; div. 1975) Laura Ziskin (m. 2010; died 2011)
- Relatives: Herb Sargent (brother); Alvin York (cousin)

Alvin Sargent (born Supowitz; April 12, 1927 – May 9, 2019) was an American screenwriter. He won two Academy Awards for Best Adapted Screenplay, for Julia (1977) and Ordinary People (1980). Sargent's other works include screenplays of the films The Sterile Cuckoo (1969), The Effect of Gamma Rays on Man-in-the-Moon Marigolds (1970), Paper Moon (1973), Nuts (1987), White Palace (1990), What About Bob? (1991), Unfaithful (2002), Spider-Man 2 (2004), Spider-Man 3 (2007), and The Amazing Spider-Man (2012).

== Early life ==
Alvin Sargent was born Alvin Supowitz in Philadelphia, Pennsylvania, the son of Esther (née Kadansky) and Isaac Supowitz. He was of Russian-Jewish descent. Sargent attended Upper Darby High School, leaving aged 17 to join the Navy. As of 2006, he was one of 35 alumni to be on the school's Wall of Fame.

== Career ==
Sargent began writing for television in 1953. Through the 1960s he scripted episodes for Route 66, Ben Casey and The Alfred Hitchcock Hour. His first film screenplay was Gambit (1966), written with Jack Davies. He gained recognition for I Walk the Line (1970) and Paper Moon (1973). For his work on the latter, he won the WGA Award for Best Screenplay Based on Material from Another Medium and was nominated for an Academy Award. He won the Academy Award for Adapted Screenplay in 1978 for the film Julia (1977), and again in 1981 for Ordinary People (1980). Near the end of his career, he collaborated on the screenplays for three Spider-Man films: Spider-Man 2 (2004), Spider-Man 3 (2007), and The Amazing Spider-Man (2012).

== Personal life ==
He had a longtime relationship with producer Laura Ziskin; they were married from 2010 until her death in 2011. His brother was writer and producer Herb Sargent.

== Death ==
Sargent died from natural causes in Seattle on May 9, 2019, at the age of 92.

== Filmography ==
=== Writer ===
Year	Title	Notes
1966	Gambit	Co-written with Jack Davies.
1968	The Stalking Moon	Co-written with Wendell Mayes.
1969	The Sterile Cuckoo	
1970	I Walk the Line	
1972	The Effect of Gamma Rays on Man-in-the-Moon Marigolds	
1973	Paper Moon	
1973	Love and Pain and the Whole Damn Thing	
1977	Julia	
1977	Bobby Deerfield	
1978	Straight Time	Co-written with Jeffrey Boam.
1980	Ordinary People	
1987	Nuts	Co-written with Tom Topor and Daryl Ponicsan.
1988	Dominick and Eugene	
1990	White Palace	Co-written with Ted Tally.
1991	Other People's Money	
1991	What About Bob?	Story only; co-written by Laura Ziskin.
1992	Hero	Story only; co-written by Laura Ziskin and David Webb Peoples.
1996	Bogus	
1999	Anywhere but Here	
2002	Unfaithful	Co-written with William Broyles Jr.
2002	Spider-Man	Uncredited.
2004	Spider-Man 2	
2007	Spider-Man 3	Co-written with Sam Raimi and Ivan Raimi.
2012	The Amazing Spider-Man	Co-written with James Vanderbilt and Steve Kloves.

=== Actor ===
- From Here to Eternity (1953) - Nair (uncredited)

== See also ==
- List of Russian Academy Award winners and nominees
