= USS Orlando =

Tacoma-class frigate

Coordinates: 43°N 165°E

History

United States
- Name: Orlando
- Namesake: City of Orlando, Florida
- Laid down: 2 August 1943
- Launched: 1 December 1943
- Commissioned: 15 November 1944
- Decommissioned: 27 June 1946
- Stricken: 19 July 1946
- Identification: PF-99
- Fate: Sold for scrap, 10 November 1947

General characteristics
- Class & type: Tacoma-class frigate
- Displacement: 1430 tons
- Length: 304 ft (93 m)
- Beam: 38 ft (12 m)
- Draft: 13.8 ft (4.2 m)
- Speed: 20 kn (37 km/h; 23 mph)
- Complement: 201 officers and men
- Armament: 2 × 3-inch/50-caliber gun

USS Orlando (PF-99) was a Tacoma-class frigate that served during World War II. She was the only ship of the United States Navy to be named for Orlando, Florida.

== Construction ==
She was authorized with the hull classification symbol PG-207 but reclassified PF-99 in April 1943. Her keel was laid down 2 August 1943, under a Maritime Commission Contract by American Ship Building Company, in Cleveland, Ohio. She was launched on 1 December 1943, sponsored by Mrs. E. Harold Johnson, and commissioned on 15 November 1944.

== Service history ==
After Orlando made a shakedown cruise to Bermuda, her first convoy departed from Hampton Roads on 7 February 1945. Orlando rounded up the stragglers from her position in the rear of the 37-ship convoy bound for Mers el Kebir, Algeria. The convoy passed through the Strait of Gibraltar on 22 February and arrived at Mers el Kebir two days later.

On 3 March escort duty commenced again as a 43-ship convoy started on its way across the Atlantic Ocean. By 15 March various units of the convoy began to detach themselves from the main body of ships and Orlando departed the convoy to proceed to Boston, Massachusetts.

After training exercises Orlando commenced her second trans-Atlantic voyage to Mers el Kebir as part of a convoy screen. The ship remained at Mers el Kebir until joining a convoy bound for the United States on 2 May. With the crossing completed, the convoy commenced to break up on 14 May and Orlando returned to New York City with a section of the convoy before proceeding to Boston for voyage repairs.

On 5 July Orlando departed for New York to be converted to a weather ship and prepare for distant service. The frigate got underway from New York Harbor 10 August bound for the Panama Canal. On the way the successful conclusion of the war against Japan was announced.

The ship transited the Panama Canal and arrived at Pearl Harbor on 5 September 1945. Five days later Orlando and Gulfport stood out of the channel at Pearl Harbor and set course for Adak in the Andreanof Islands to moor in Sweepers Cove, Adak on 16 September.

The ship took a weather station in the area around 43 degrees North, 165 degrees East from 7 October until 25 October. Through the month of November the ship was moored in Finger Bay, Adak. The lonely weather station duty continued as Orlando remained in the area around Adak until arriving at Seattle, Washington, on 12 May 1946.

The naval career of the frigate Orlando ended at Seattle where she was taken out of commission 27 June 1946. She was struck from the Naval Vessel Register on 19 July 1946, and was sold for scrapping 10 November 1947 to the Zidell Ship Dismantling Company.

== In popular culture ==
In the 1973 film Cinderella Liberty, James Caan portrayed a sailor assigned to USS Orlando and wore the ship's name on his right shoulder rocker. Additionally, a submarine named the USS Orlando played a major role in the 1996 film Down Periscope. Both ships are unrelated to the actual USS Orlando except in name only.
