= The Brotherhood (1968 film) =

1968 film directed by Martin Ritt

- Theatrical release poster
- Directed by: Martin Ritt
- Written by: Lewis John Carlino
- Produced by: Kirk Douglas
- Starring: Kirk Douglas; Alex Cord; Irene Papas; Luther Adler
- Cinematography: Boris Kaufman
- Edited by: Frank Bracht
- Music by: Lalo Schifrin
- Production companies: Bryna Productions; The Brotherhood Company
- Distributed by: Paramount Pictures
- Release date: December 25, 1968
- Running time: 96 minutes
- Country: United States
- Language: English

The Brotherhood is a 1968 American crime drama film directed by Martin Ritt, from a screenplay by Lewis John Carlino. It was produced by Kirk Douglas, who also stars alongside Alex Cord, Irene Papas, Luther Adler, and Susan Strasberg.

Released by Paramount Pictures, while the film received mixed to positive reviews, it bombed at the box office, with Paramount deciding not to produce another gangster film until it made The Godfather four years later.

== Plot ==
A young American man arrives in Palermo by plane. A taxi driver at the airport immediately gets word to Frank Ginetta, who hides, armed with a gun, until he realizes that the visitor he's been warned about is actually his younger brother Vinnie.

Frank happily welcomes his brother and takes him home, catching up on old times. But his wife, Ida, reminds him that "they're going to send someone," suggesting that perhaps Vinnie is the one.

In a flashback, Frank recalls better times in New York City, beginning with Vinnie's homecoming from military service and subsequent marriage to Emma Bertolo. The father of the bride, Dominick Bertolo is a Mafia don, as is the groom's brother, Frank. And among those paying their respects as guests at the wedding are other mob leaders.

These capos within the Organization meet as a board to coordinate their business. The majority becomes increasingly unhappy with Frank's position, as he seems opposed to every new idea. Frank also dispenses justice on his own in the old Sicilian fashion, without seeking approval from the others. They, not being of Sicilian origin, are trying to leave behind the old traditional methods, such as when two of Frank's hit men kill a stool pigeon in the marshes and leave him tied to a chair with a canary stuffed in his mouth, as a warning to others who might talk too much.

Frank still fondly remembers his father, who also was a mafioso who was assassinated in a hit. Vinnie is more of a businessman, and takes sides with the other board members in ventures they intend to pursue without his brother. Frank resents this, striking Vinnie for defying him and insisting to the board that Vinnie will have no part in what they have planned.

Older members of the organization who are no longer involved in decision-making tell Frank that it was Dom Bertolo who made it possible for outsiders to spot and find members of their Mafia family, resulting in 41 murders, Frank's father included. Bertolo had taken up outside of the family 35 years earlier with Irish and Jewish outsiders who wanted to get in the Mafia, and by doing so secured his own power in the larger, expanded outfit against older members like Frank's father. Frank is conflicted because Bertolo is his brother's father in law, but the Sicilian code of honor decides what he must do. Pretending to reconcile with Dominick for past differences, he offers to submit to the new deal, while in reality he is taking him to a deserted warehouse to be executed. As he realizes what his fate is, a terrified Dominick collapses from heart failure.

Frank hides out in Sicily, but knows his days are numbered and that the Board plans to have him killed. Realizing that it is Vinnie who has been forced under threats by Egan to do the job of killing him, Frank bitterly accepts this fate in the hope that it will save his brother's life and that of his family back in America. Vinnie realizes at last that he has been played like a puppet all along against his well-meaning brother, who in order to protect him lays down his own life, handing Vinnie their father's shotgun with which to shoot him.

== Cast ==
- Kirk Douglas as Frank Ginetta
- Alex Cord as Vince Ginetta
- Irene Papas as Ida Ginetta
- Luther Adler as Dominick Bertolo
- Susan Strasberg as Emma Ginetta
- Murray Hamilton as Jim Egan
- Eduardo Ciannelli as Don Peppino
- Joe De Santis as Pietro Rizzi
- Connie Scott as Carmela Ginetta
- Val Avery as Jake Rotherman
- Val Bisoglio as Cheech
- Alan Hewitt as Sol Levin
- Barry Primus as Vito
- Michele Cimarosa as Totò
- Louis Badolati as Don Turiddu
- Anthony Marciona as Antonio (uncredited)

== Critical reception ==
On the review aggregator Rotten Tomatoes, the film holds an approval rating of 60% based on reviews from 10 critics.

Vincent Canby of The New York Times gave the film a positive review, calling it "a blunt, square and sentimental Mafia movie whose heart belongs to the senior soldiers.... For anyone with a real affection for movies—and their sometimes remarkably ingenuous attitudes towards life—The Brotherhood also should be quite entertaining."

Leonard Maltin's annual Movie Guide rated the film three stars out of four, citing its excellent story.

== See also ==
- List of American films of 1968
