= Cinderella Liberty =

1973 film drama directed by Mark Rydell

- Theatrical release poster
- Directed by: Mark Rydell
- Screenplay by: Darryl Ponicsan
- Based on: Cinderella Liberty by Darryl Ponicsan
- Produced by: Mark Rydell
- Starring: James Caan; Marsha Mason; Eli Wallach
- Cinematography: Vilmos Zsigmond
- Edited by: Patrick Kennedy
- Music by: John Williams
- Production company: Sanford Productions
- Distributed by: 20th Century Fox
- Release dates: December 18, 1973 (U.S.); April 7, 1974 (Sweden); September 27, 1974 (Belgium); September 30, 1974 (Germany); November 8, 1974 (Finland)
- Running time: 117 min.
- Country: United States
- Language: English
- Budget: $2,465,000
- Box office: $3.7 million (rentals)

Cinderella Liberty is a 1973 American drama film adapted by Daryl Ponicsan from his 1973 novel of the same title. The film tells the story of a sailor who falls in love with a prostitute and becomes a surrogate father for her 10-year-old mixed race son. The film stars James Caan, Marsha Mason and Eli Wallach, and was produced and directed by Mark Rydell.

The title is derived from the plot point that the sailor, while receiving medical treatment at the Navy base's medical facility, is given what is called a "Cinderella Liberty" pass which allows him to freely leave the naval base as long as he is back by midnight curfew. The movie was filmed in Seattle, Washington.

The film is one of two 1973 film adaptations of Ponicsan's novels based on his experiences in the U.S. Navy; the other being The Last Detail.

== Plot ==
John J. Baggs Jr., a U.S. Navy sailor and Vietnam veteran, checks into the Seattle naval base medical facility for treatment of a pilonidal cyst. His medical test results are delayed, preventing him from rejoining his ship when it sails. He gets a clean bill of health, but must wait at the base for reassignment to another ship, and is given a "Cinderella liberty" pass that allows him to come and go from the base until the midnight curfew. Shortly thereafter, the base loses his records, making him unable to be reassigned or receive pay or benefits, and keeping him stuck at the base on "Cinderella liberty" until his records are found.

On his first night in a bar, he is racing the clock to find a woman before midnight, and is attracted to Maggie, a prostitute hustling sailors at a pool table. He challenges her at pool, and later goes to her tenement apartment for a sexual encounter, discovering that she lives with her bi-racial 11-year-old son Doug. Baggs later finds Doug out drinking beer, and lectures Maggie about her lack of motherly oversight towards her son. Noticing that Doug is often left to fend for himself, Baggs begins spending time with him, while also developing a relationship with Maggie, with whom he is falling in love. The couple almost break up when Baggs learns Maggie is pregnant by a man she knew before she met Baggs, but they reconcile and Baggs accepts responsibility for the unborn child as well.

At the base, Baggs runs into his former training instructor, an older sailor named Forshay, who treated Baggs brutally. After an initial fistfight, Baggs learns that Forshay has been demoted and is being discharged due to his mistreatment of recruits, one of whom had political connections. Forshay's love of the Navy has been the only constant in his life and Forshay has no family or relationships outside the Navy. Baggs feels sorry for him and becomes his friend, while not wanting to repeat the same pattern in his own life. After his discharge, Forshay loses his pension and is forced to take a menial job as a strip show barker.

Baggs attempts to create a normal family life for Maggie and Doug, and succeeds for a while despite the obstacles presented by his lack of pay and benefits. He and Maggie marry, but due to his lost records, the Navy refuses to recognize the marriage or grant Maggie and Doug the normal privileges given to a sailor's family. Doug, suspicious and cynical at first, bonds with Baggs, who manages to get Doug's painfully decayed teeth fixed at the naval base by an unqualified dental assistant. Maggie gives birth prematurely to a son, whom she names after Baggs, but the baby dies soon after birth, causing a distraught Maggie to return to prostitution in order to distract herself from her grief. The Navy finally locates Baggs' records and reassigns him to a new ship, also giving him $1400 in back pay. When he goes to tell Maggie, he finds she has departed for New Orleans with another man, and left Doug behind for Baggs to look after. In order to stay with Doug, Baggs gets Forshay to change places with him and ship out under his name. After waving goodbye to a happy Forshay, Baggs and Doug then head for New Orleans to look for Maggie.

== Cast ==
- James Caan as John Baggs Jr.
- Marsha Mason as Maggie Paul
- Kirk Calloway as Doug Paul
- Eli Wallach as Lynn Forshay
- Burt Young as Master at Arms
- Dabney Coleman as the Exec
- Bruno Kirby as Alcott
- Allyn Ann McLerie as Miss Watkins (welfare worker)
- Allan Arbus as Drunken Sailor

== Production ==
James Caan later said his character was "like Billy Budd, all pure and good."

== Reception ==
Cinderella Liberty was nominated for the Golden Globe Award for Best Motion Picture, while Marsha Mason won the Golden Globe for Best Actress. Mason also received the first of four Academy Awards nominations for Best Actress in a Leading Role, while the film received Academy Award nominations for Best Music, Original Dramatic Score, and Best Music, Song (John Williams and Paul Williams for "Nice to Be Around"). On Rotten Tomatoes, the film has an aggregate score of 56% based on 5 positive and 4 negative critic reviews.

In lamenting many of the film choices he made in the years immediately following his Oscar and Golden Globe nominated performance in The Godfather, Caan mentioned Cinderella Liberty as one of the exceptions to those regrets, commenting that he liked the film a lot. He and Mason reunited on Chapter Two.

== Soundtrack ==
Cinderella Liberty
No.	Title	Length
1.	"Wednesday Special (Main Title)" (Vocal by Paul Williams)	2:28
2.	"Nice to Be Around"	2:51
3.	"New Shooter"	3:07
4.	"Maggie Shoots Pool"	3:56
5.	"Maggie and Baggs"	4:07
6.	"Boxing Montage"	2:59
7.	"Nice to Be Around" (Vocal by Paul Williams)	2:38
8.	"Neptune's Bar"	2:23
9.	"Cinderella Liberty Love Theme"	3:59
10.	"The Ferry Ride"	1:46
11.	"A Baby Boy Arrives"	2:06
12.	"Wednesday Special (End Title)" (Vocal by Paul Williams)	2:28

== See also ==
- List of American films of 1973
- The Last Detail
- USS Orlando
