= Picture Perfect (1997 film) =

1997 film by Glenn Gordon Caron

- Theatrical release poster
- Directed by: Glenn Gordon Caron
- Screenplay by: Paul Slansky; Arleen Sorkin; Glenn Gordon Caron
- Story by: Paul Slansky; May Quigley; Arleen Sorkin
- Produced by: Erwin Stoff
- Starring: Jennifer Aniston; Jay Mohr; Olympia Dukakis; Illeana Douglas; Kevin Dunn; Kevin Bacon
- Cinematography: Paul Sarossy
- Edited by: Robert Reitano
- Music by: Carter Burwell
- Production company: 3 Arts Entertainment
- Distributed by: 20th Century Fox
- Release date: August 4, 1997
- Running time: 105 minutes
- Country: United States
- Language: English
- Budget: $18 million
- Box office: $44.3 million

Picture Perfect is a 1997 American romantic comedy film directed by Glenn Gordon Caron, written by Arleen Sorkin, and starring Jennifer Aniston, Jay Mohr, Kevin Bacon, Illeana Douglas, Olympia Dukakis, and Anne Twomey. The film centers around a young advertising executive's life, which becomes increasingly complicated when, in order to impress her boss, she pretends to be engaged to a man she just met. Picture Perfect was released on August 4, 1997, by 20th Century Fox. It received mixed reviews from critics and grossed $44.3 million against an $18 million budget.

== Plot ==
Kate is struggling in the advertising business in New York City: she cannot move forward despite her talent. Her boss, Mr. Mercer, passes her up for a promotion because she is "not stable enough". Her coworker, Darcy, invents a story claiming Kate is engaged to Nick, a freelance videographer who lives in Massachusetts, with whom Kate had her picture taken during a friend's wedding.

All seems to work out well for Kate, who gets her promotion, but after Nick saves a little girl from a fire and winds up in the news, Kate is asked to bring her alleged fiancé to dinner with Mercer and his wife. She goes to Boston to ask Nick to do it and to "break up" with her during the evening. Nick, who likes Kate, agrees to please Kate. Meanwhile, Sam, a colleague that Kate had always wanted, takes notice of her because she is engaged, and they have sex on two occasions.

Nick arrives in New York and stays at Kate's apartment, and as they get to know each other, she starts to like him. When they are at the dinner with Mercer, Nick compliments Kate and expresses his desire for a future with her. Kate just wants their "fight" to happen, and after unsuccessfully trying to incite Nick at the dinner table, she pays a restaurant employee to call her mobile phone and makes out that Nick is having an affair with an ex-girlfriend. Nick figures it out and finally plays along. The next day, after his attempt to woo Kate fails, he returns to Boston.

A week later, Kate finds a special gift Nick had left her that prompts her to admit the fake to Mercer and her coworkers, stating that she was dressing for the job she wanted (repeating a line that Mercer had used on her earlier regarding her instability). When she tells him she is quitting, Mercer admits how he had exaggerated his own past at one point in his life. He lets Kate keep her job and suggests she take a few days off to go see Nick.

Kate walks in while Nick is recording a church wedding, and he rebuffs her attempts to patch things up until she interrupts the ceremony at a crucial point. Watched by the entire wedding assembly, she apologizes for the way she treated him. He invites her to stay for the wedding reception and dinner afterwards, and they embrace, as the congregation applauds them.

== Cast ==
- Jennifer Aniston as Kate Mosley
- Jay Mohr as Nick
- Kevin Bacon as Sam Mayfair
- Olympia Dukakis as Rita Mosley
- Illeana Douglas as Darcy O'Neil
- Kevin Dunn as Mr. Mercer
- Anne Twomey as Sela
- Faith Prince as Mrs. Mercer
- John Rothman as Jim Davenport
- Meg Gibson as Mrs. Davenport
- Paul Cassell as Brad
- Ivar Brogger as 1st Ad Executive
- Peter McRobbie as 2nd Ad Executive
- Bray Poor as 3rd Ad Executive
- Daryl Edwards 4th Ad Executive
- Jenna Stern as 5th Ad Executive
- Bellina Logan as Ad Agency Receptionist
- Sean Patrick Thomas as Ad Agency Researcher
- Andrea Bendewald as Pregnant Friend
- Marcia DeBonis as Rosie
- Matthew Sussman as Darcy's Husband
- Amelia Campbell as Susan
- Faran Tahir as Sajit
- David Cromwell as Minister
- Jessica Cushman as Bride
- Kaley Cuoco as Little Girl at the wedding
- Greg Grunberg as Date (uncredited)

== Production ==
Academy Award winner Tom Fleischman is the re-recording mixer of the film. Picture Perfect also consists of other Academy Award nominees such as Les Lazarowitz, Jane Robinson, and Debra Schutt.

The movie was shot in June and July 1996.

Kaley Cuoco later revealed that "I was the last name in the credits (credited as ‘little girl’).. when I saw the movie, they had cut my one line".

== Reception ==
On the review aggregator website Rotten Tomatoes, 45% of 42 critics' reviews are positive, with an average rating of 5.4/10. Metacritic, which uses a weighted average, assigned the film a score of 46 out of 100, based on 16 critics, indicating "mixed or average" reviews. Audiences surveyed by CinemaScore gave the film a grade "B−" on a scale of A to F.

Roger Ebert found the film at odds with itself, noting how the script has poor storytelling elements but contains "nice dialogue touches" delivered by the characters, saying that "it's a shame the plot is so contrived, because parts of this [movie] are really pretty good." Janet Maslin of The New York Times called it a "light, undemanding comedy", commending its use of sitcom humor, bits of satire and the performances of Aniston, Douglas and Bacon, concluding that it "bounces busily among these players until it has to slow down and pretend to be sincere." Marc Savlov of The Austin Chronicle heavily criticized the film for having the aesthetics of "an over-long, over-nice, made-for-TV movie that goes nowhere quick." He gave notice to Aniston's performance lacking sustainability to capture the big screen, and bringing the rest of the main cast to her acting level.

=== Box office ===
The film opened at number 5 at the North American box office making $7.8 million in its opening Monday. It eventually earned over $44 million worldwide, against a budget of $18 million.

=== Adaptation ===
In Thailand, it was released in 1998 and was later adapted into a television drama titled Rak Leh Phetubai on Channel 3 in mid-1999, starring Lalita Panyopas and Willy McIntosh.

== Soundtrack ==
Picture Perfect

Soundtrack album by Various
- Released: 1997
- Genre: Pop
- Label: Warner Bros. Records

No.	Title	Music	Length
1.	"Show Me How to Catch a Fish"	Jane Kelly Williams
2.	"Sex Life"	Geoffrey Williams
3.	"They Don't Know"	Kirsty MacColl
4.	"Get Down Tonight"	KC & The Sunshine Band
5.	"Runaround Sue"	Dion
6.	"Love Will Keep Us Together"	Captain and Tennille
7.	"Fruitful Acre"	From Good Homes
8.	"Wide Open Wide"	From Good Homes
9.	"Extra Super Fine"	Dragstrip Superstar
10.	"Bad Girls"	Donna Summer
11.	"When Dreams Turn to Dust"	Cathy Dennis
12.	"Say What You Want"	Texas
13.	"Heaven Only Knows"	Swing Out Sister
14.	"I Try"	Macy Gray
15.	"Amateur"	Aimee Mann
16.	"Bach]s Jesu of Man's Desring #7"	Marie-Claire Alain
17.	"Mendelssohn's Wedding March"	Marie-Claire Alain
