= Anne Argula =

American novelist

- Born: Darryl Ponicsan; May 26, 1938 (age 88); Shenandoah, Pennsylvania, U.S.
- Writing career
- Language: English
- Genre: Mystery

Anne Argula is a pen name used by Darryl Ponicsan for several mysteries set in the Pacific Northwest. He was born in Northeast Pennsylvania and currently resides in Seattle, Washington.

The first novel in the series, Homicide My Own (2005), is about a cop who solves his own murder from a previous life. It was nominated for an Edgar Award.

The second in the series is Walla Walla Suite (2007), which follows Quinn, who narrated the first book. Now she is in Seattle and working for a mitigation investigator until she is drawn into an unusual murder case.

The third in the series is Krapp's Last Cassette, in which Quinn is hired by a screenwriter to verify the existence of a writer whose book he is adapting for HBO. The title is a play on the title of Samuel Beckett's Krapp's Last Tape.

The fourth and final of the series is "The Other Romanian," in which Quinn becomes involved in recovering an 18 karat bookmark that belonged to Hitler, given to him by his mistress.

Argula's Quinn novels are marked by humor and coal regions idiom.

== Bibliography ==
- Homicide My Own (Pleasure Boat Studio, 2005 ISBN 9781929355211)
- Walla Walla Suite (Ballantine Books, 2007 ISBN 9780345498427)
- Krapp's Last Cassette (Ballantine Books, 2009 ISBN 9780345498441)
- The Other Romanian (Pleasure Boat Studio, 2012 ISBN 9781929355853)
