= Anthony Marciona =

American actor

- Born: September 27, 1961 (age 64); The Bronx, New York, U.S.
- Occupations: Actor, musician, dancer
- Years active: 1968–present
- Partner: Joseph A. LoBue

Anthony Marciona (born September 27, 1961) is an American film, Broadway and television actor, singer and dancer from New York City. Marciona began his acting career at the age of five playing Kirk Douglas' godson in The Brotherhood.

== Biography ==
Marciona was born in The Bronx, New York to parents Joseph Marciona, a retired NYC teacher, and Louise (née Smedile). He and his family moved to Pelham in Westchester County, where he graduated from Pelham Memorial High School. After graduating he moved back to New York City.

He currently resides in Los Angeles with his business and life partner, Joseph A. LoBue. He has one sister.

=== Education ===
Marciona studied film making at the School of Visual Arts in New York, University of California Los Angeles, and also received a business degree from SMC. He was also a composition/jazz major at the Manhattan School of Music. Marciona studied drama at the Royal Academy of Dramatic Arts in London, American Academy of Dramatic Arts, HB Studios, The Groundlings, BANG. He has also been coached under Sanford Meisner, Diane Castle, Bill Esper, and John Kirby.

== Career ==
=== Acting ===
Aside from acting, Marciona has become active behind the scenes as well. In 1990 he founded and is director of ETC inc. a Non-profit organization which presents New American Theatre in Rome, Italy and Los Angeles. He produced four short film projects which have won awards on PBS and the festival circuit under his production company D.I.Y.N. Productions which he co-established with Raymond Carver Award-winning writer/director Joyceann Masters.

Marciona has also been a commercial casting session director having worked for McDonald's, Pepsi, United Airlines and many other company's.

He created and ran a multi-media arts complex called The Space, in Hollywood, California consisting of multiple casting studios, 2 performing arts theaters, rehearsal facilities, and production offices.

=== Music and dance ===
As a musical composer Marciona has completed the scores to the stage musicals Murder At The Palace and Powder Puff Derby. Marciona plays the piano and has written for and performed with two pop music bands, Interpret and Ariel & Anthony.

== Stage ==
Year	Show	Venue	Notes
1977	Landscape of the Body	Academy Festival Theatre, Lake Forest, Illinois	As Donny
1986	Buskers	Stage Arts Centre / Actors Outlet Theatre Center	Off-off-Broadway musical
1990	Starlight Express	Kennedy Center Opera House	
1992	The Who's Tommy	La Jolla Playhouse	
2022	Singing Revolution: The Musical	The Broadwater Theatre, Los Angeles	

== Filmography ==
Year	Film	Character	Role
1968	The Brotherhood	Antonio	Uncredited
1973	My Brother Anastasia	Giuseppe	
1980	The Idolmaker	Gigi	
1985	HeartBeat	Roy	TV movie
1985	Invasion U.S.A.	Carlos	
1986	Playing for Keeps	Ronnie Long	
2005	Feet Afire	Don Marciona	Supporting role
2006	Clerks II	Dancer #1	
2006	Jackass Number Two	Dancer	Uncredited
2007	The Documents (Dokymentbl)	Fig Man	Short
2008	An American Carol	Professor #6	
2006	500 Days of Summer	Dancer #22	
2006	Did You Hear About the Morgans?	Dancer #7	
2011	Brickwalk Café	Gentleman	
2014	Lucky Stiff	Italian Man	
2014	The Nurse	Husband	
2016	La La Land	Epilogue Dancer	
2020	Darkness in Tenement 45	Horen	

== Television appearances ==
Year	TV Show	Role	Episode
1983	CHiPs	Lenny	"Return of the Brat Patrol"
1995	Murder, She Wrote	Stage Manager	"Murder in High C"
1996	Spider-Man	(voice) Additional Voices	"Sins of the Fathers Chapter 2: Make a Wish"
2003	Dragnet	Slezak	"Well Endowed"
2004	Six Feet Under	(stunts)	"In Case of Rapture"
2006	Cold Case	Kit Kat Boy #2	"Willkommen"
2006	Alias	Luigi	"No Hard Feelings"
2010/2011	Glee	Dancer	3 episodes (uncredited)
2013	The Thundermans	Arith-mo-tick	"Reportcard"
