= Darryl Ponicsan =

American writer

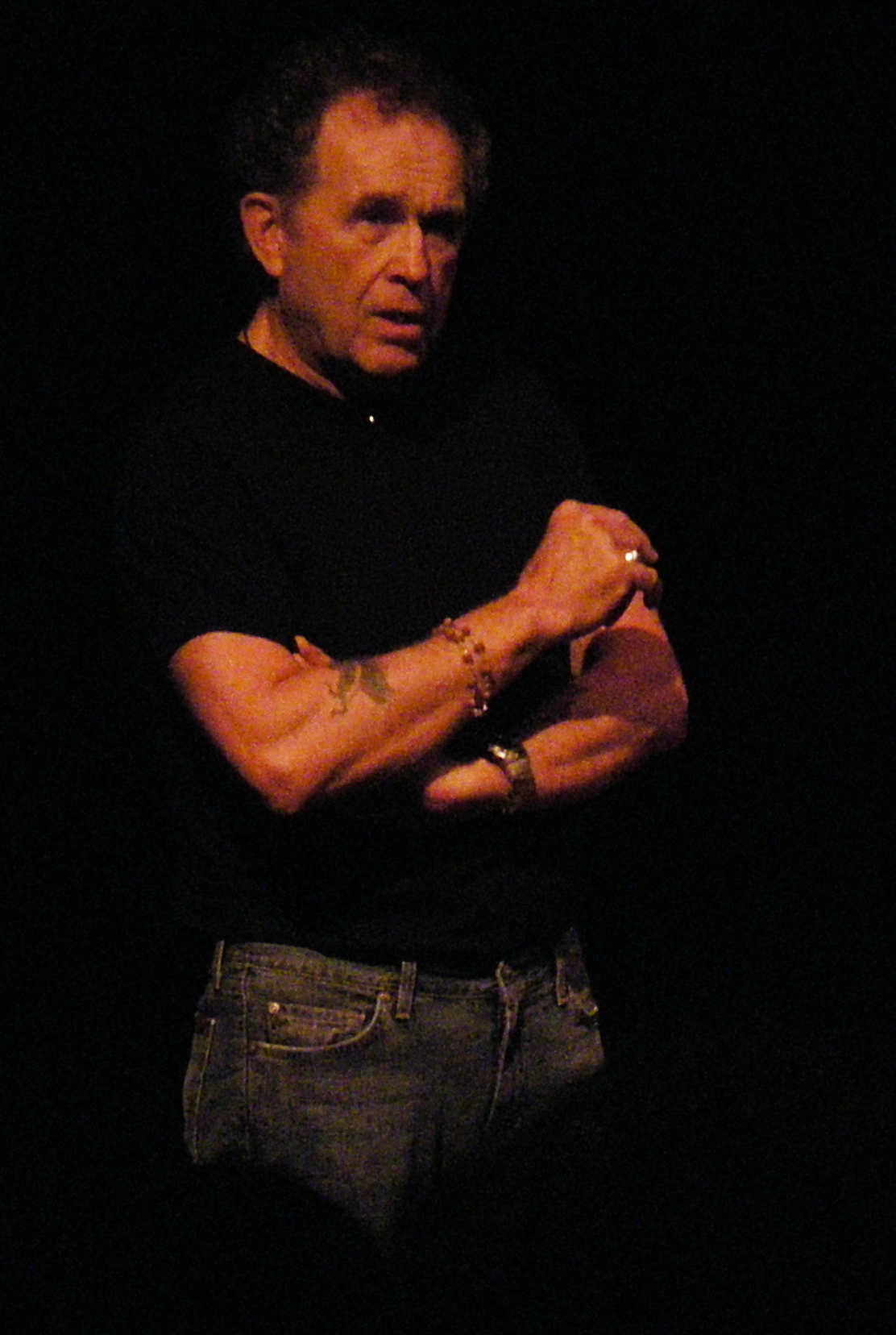
- Ponicsan in 2008
- Born: May 26, 1938 (age 88); Shenandoah, Pennsylvania, U.S.
- Education: Muhlenberg College (AB); Cornell University (MA)
- Occupations: Author, screenwriter
- Writing career
- Pen name: Anne Argula
- Language: English

Darryl Ponicsan (/ˈpɒnɪsən/; born May 26, 1938) is an American writer. He is best known as the author of the 1970 novel The Last Detail, which was adapted into the 1973 film of the same name starring Jack Nicholson. A sequel, Last Flag Flying, based on his 2005 novel of the same name, was released in 2017; he co-wrote the screenplay with director Richard Linklater. He also wrote the 1973 novel and screenplay Cinderella Liberty, starring James Caan. Ponicsan writes mystery novels under the pen name Anne Argula.

== Life and career ==
Ponicsan was born in Shenandoah, Pennsylvania, the son of Anne (née Kuleck) and Frank G. Ponicsan, a merchant. He attended Muhlenberg College, (A.B., 1959) and Cornell University, (M.A., 1965).

He was a high school English teacher in Owego, New York from 1959 to 1962. He served in the U.S. Navy from 1962 to 1965 aboard the USS Monrovia and USS Intrepid during the Vietnam War, attaining the rank of Yeoman 3rd Class. He was a social worker for Los Angeles County, Los Angeles, California in 1965, and a high school English teacher in La Cañada, California from 1966 to 1969.

Ponicsan also wrote the screenplays for the CBS movie A Girl Called Hatter Fox (1977), the movies Nuts (1987), School Ties (1992), the HBO movie The Enemy Within (1992), and the CBS series The Mississippi (1983). He has worked frequently with producer-director Harold Becker, penning scripts for Taps (1981), Vision Quest (1985), and The Boost (1988).

== Bibliography ==
- The Last Detail (New York: Dial Press, 1970)
- Goldengrove (New York: Dial Press, 1971)
- Andoshen, Pa. (New York: Dial Press, 1973)
- Cinderella Liberty (New York: Harper and Row, 1973)
- Tom Mix Died for Your Sins (New York: Delacorte Press 1975)
- The Accomplice (New York: Harper and Row, 1975)
- The Ringmaster (New York: Delacorte Press, 1978)
- An Unmarried Man (New York: Delacorte Press 1980)
- Last Flag Flying (New York: Skyhorse Publishing, 2005)
- Homicide My Own (as Anne Argula) (New York: Pleasure Boat Studio, 2005)
- Walla Walla Suite: A Room with No View (as Anne Argula) (New York: Ballantine, 2007)
- Krapp's Last Cassette (as Anne Argula) (Ballantine, 2009) [cf. Krapp's Last Tape by Samuel Beckett]
- The Last Romanian (as Anne Argula) (New York: Pleasure Boat Studio, 2012)
- Eternal Sojourners (New York: Skyhorse Publishing, 2019)
- I Feel Bad About My Dick: Lamentations of Masculine Vanity and Lists of Startling Pertinence (Seattle: Pleasure Boat Studio, 2020)

== Filmography ==
- The Last Detail (1973) (novel)
- Cinderella Liberty (1973) (novel and screenwriter)
- The Girl Called Hatter Fox (1977) (TV)
- Taps (with Robert Mark Kamen and James Lineberger) (1981)
- The Mississippi (1982) (TV)
- Vision Quest (1985)
- Nuts (with Alvin Sargent and Tom Topor) (1987)
- The Boost (1988)
- School Ties (with Dick Wolf) (1992)
- The Enemy Within (with Ron Bass) (1994) (TV)
- Random Hearts (with Kurt Luedtke) (1999)
- Last Flag Flying (2017) (novel and screenwriter)
