= Somerset Maugham TV Theatre =

- Also known as: Teller of Tales
- Written by: Russell Beggs; W. Somerset Maugham; Mathilde Ferro; Theodore Ferro; Agnes Nixon
- Directed by: David Alexander; Martin Ritt
- Presented by: W. Somerset Maugham
- Country of origin: United States
- Original language: English
- No. of seasons: 3
- No. of episodes: 47

Production
- Producers: John Gibbs; Ann Marlow; Daniel Petrie
- Production locations: New York City, U.S.
- Running time: 30 minutes (season 1-2); 60 minutes (season 3)

Original release
- Network: CBS (season 1); NBC (season 2-3)
- Release: October 18, 1950 – December 10, 1951

Somerset Maugham TV Theatre (originally known as Teller of Tales for the first three episodes) is an American anthology drama program. The series aired on CBS October 18, 1950 – March 28, 1951, and on NBC April 2, 1951 – December 10, 1951.

== Premise ==
The series made its debut on October 18, 1950 on CBS. The series was a half-hour (later 60 minute) drama whose episodes were based on the works and novels of the show's namesake William Somerset Maugham.

Maugham appeared for one minute at the beginning of each episode and for 30 seconds at the end. His segments were live on the first three episodes and were filmed thereafter, while the dramas themselves were presented live.

=== Season 2 Changes ===
==== Move to NBC ====
After the series finished its run on CBS after one season on March 28, 1951, the series was moved to NBC on April 2, 1951. The series would remain for the rest of its run. The series also moved from Wednesday nights to Monday nights and expanded to 60 minutes, alternating weekly with Robert Montgomery Presents.

Season two finished its second season on September 3 after airing 16 episodes.

=== Season 3 ===
The series started its third season on September 17, 1951, continuing to air on Monday nights and for sixty minutes. This season would be the show's final season airing its last episode on December 10, 1951, after airing 7 episodes.

== Production ==
The series was directed by directors Martin Ritt and David Alexander and produced by John Gibbs, Ann Marlow, and Daniel Petrie.

During its third season, the show alternated on Monday nights with the NBC anthology series Robert Montgomery Presents.

Tintair sponsored the program. The company ended its sponsorship effective December 10, 1951, because it felt that the show's alternate-week status diminished the impact of Tintair's advertising.

== Broadcast history ==
- Wednesdays 9–9:30 PM, October 18, 1950 – March 28, 1951, on CBS.
- Mondays 9:30–10:30 PM, April 2, 1951 – June 25, 1951, on NBC.
- Mondays 9:30–10 PM, July 9, 1951 – August 27, 1951, on NBC.
- Mondays 9:30–10:30 PM, September 3, 1951 – December 10, 1951, on NBC.

== Cast ==
Actors appearing in the series included:

- Luther Adler
- Judith Anderson
- Constance Bennett
- Joan Bennett
- Lee J. Cobb
- Dane Clark
- Robert Cummings
- Mildred Dunnock
- Nina Foch
- Rita Gam
- Bonita Granville
- June Havoc
- Grace Kelly
- Otto Kruger
- Veronica Lake
- Cloris Leachman
- Ross Martin
- Murray Matheson
- Peggy McCay
- Mildred Natwick
- Anthony Quinn
- Joseph Schildkraut
- Martha Scott
- Beatrice Straight
- Jessica Tandy

== Episodes ==
Season	Episodes	Season premiere	Season finale
1	24	October 18, 1950	March 28, 1951
2	16	April 2, 1951	September 3, 1951
3	7	September 17, 1951	December 10, 1951

=== Season 1 ===
- The Creative Impulse – October 18, 1950
- McKintosh – October 25, 1950
- Winter Cruise – November 1, 1950
- Episode – November 15, 1950
- "The Unconquered" – November 19, 1950, Rex Williams, Olive Deering
- "Lord Mountdrago" – November 22, 1950, Arnold Moss
- The String of Beads – November 29, 1950
- Force of Circumstance – December 6, 1950
- The Round Dozen – December 13, 1950
- Footprints in the Jungle – December 20, 1950
- Virtue – December 27, 1950
- The Treasure – January 3, 1951
- The Man from Glasgow – January 10, 1951
- The Vessel of Wrath – January 17, 1951
- Honolulu – January 24, 1951
- Partners – January 31, 1951
- The Romantic Young Lady – February 7, 1951
- The Dream – February 14, 1951
- The People You Meet – February 21, 1951
- The Outstation – February 28, 1951
- The Back of Beyond – March 7, 1951
- Halfway to Broadway – March 14, 1951
- The Luncheon – March 21, 1951
- End of Flight – March 28, 1951

=== Season 2 ===
- Of Human Bondage – April 2, 1951
- Theatre – April 16, 1951
- The Moon and Sixpence – April 30, 1951
- The Facts of Life – May 14, 1951
- Cakes and Ale – May 28, 1951
- The Narrow Corner – June 11, 1951
- The Letter – June 25, 1951
- The French Governor – July 9, 1951
- The Promise – July 16, 1951
- In Hiding – July 23, 1951
- The Ardent Bigamist – July 30, 1951
- Bewitched – August 6, 1951
- The Great Man – August 13, 1951
- The Yellow Streak – August 20, 1951
- A Woman of Fifty – August 27, 1951
- Appearances in Reality – September 3, 1951

=== Season 3 ===
- The Mother – September 17, 1951
- Grace – October 1, 1951
- Masquerade – October 15, 1951
- The Fall of Edward Bernard – October 29, 1951
- Before the Party – November 12, 1951
- Home and Beauty – November 26, 1951
- "Smith Serves" – December 10, 1951, starring Eddie Albert

== Critical response ==
Reviewers for the trade publication Billboard had differing reactions to two episodes of the show.

The January 17, 1951, episode was described as "a superb job of emasculation" of the short story "Vessel of Wrath". The reviewer wrote that he had not seen "more lacklustre, dull, stodgy, boring, inane, stupid, empty, silly and nauseating dramatizations". He added that it was " a completely pointless production ... disgracefully dull in execution."

A review of the September 3, 1951, episode called it "one of the best full-hour programs to be seen hereabouts in a long time ... completely superior in script adaptation, acting and direction." The only flaw cited by the reviewer was "a top-heavy overdose of lengthy commercials" that were repetitive enough to irritate viewers.

== Radio version ==
The Somerset Maugham Theater, a radio version of the program was broadcast on CBS from January 20, 1951, through July 14, 1951, sponsored by Tintair. It ran on NBC from October 27, 1951, through January 19, 1952, with By-Mart as the sponsor. Stars of episodes included Clark, Hume Cronyn, Alfred Drake, Nancy Kelly, Scott, and Tandy. The producers were John Gibbs and Ann Marlowe; the director was Mitchell Grayson.

A review of the January 27, 1951, episode in Billboard said that despite "a soap opera slant", The Somerset Maugham Theater was "far above the usual daytime drama, because its basic story ideas are much stronger". The review commended Tandy's acting and Grayson's directing and complimented the commercials.
