= Last Flag Flying =

2017 film by Richard Linklater

- Theatrical release poster
- Directed by: Richard Linklater
- Screenplay by: Richard Linklater; Darryl Ponicsan
- Based on: Last Flag Flying by Darryl Ponicsan
- Produced by: Ginger Sledge; John Sloss
- Starring: Steve Carell; Bryan Cranston; Laurence Fishburne; Yul Vazquez; Cicely Tyson
- Cinematography: Shane F. Kelly
- Edited by: Sandra Adair
- Music by: Graham Reynolds
- Production companies: Cinetic Media; Detour Filmproduction
- Distributed by: Amazon Studios; Lionsgate
- Release dates: September 28, 2017 (NYFF); November 3, 2017 (United States)
- Running time: 124 minutes
- Country: United States
- Language: English
- Box office: $1.9 million

Last Flag Flying is a 2017 American war comedy-drama film directed by Richard Linklater with a screenplay by Linklater and Darryl Ponicsan, based upon the latter's 2005 novel of the same name. It stars Steve Carell, Bryan Cranston, and Laurence Fishburne as three Vietnam veterans who reunite after one of their sons is killed in the Iraq War.

Ponicsan's 2005 novel Last Flag Flying is a sequel to his 1970 novel The Last Detail, which covered the same characters earlier in their lives. For that reason, Last Flag Flying has been described as an unofficial sequel to the earlier novel's 1973 film adaptation, The Last Detail.

Principal photography began in Pittsburgh in November 2016. The film had its world premiere at the New York Film Festival on September 28, 2017, and was released in the United States by Amazon Studios and Lionsgate on November 3, 2017.

== Plot ==
In 2003, Larry "Doc" Shepherd visits the bar of Sal Nealon, a Marine veteran whom he served with in Vietnam. Sal joins Doc on an impromptu drive where Doc reveals that he has also tracked down another friend from Vietnam, now-Reverend Richard Mueller. Sal and Doc are invited to dinner with the Muellers, where Doc reveals he is recently widowed and just lost his only son in Iraq. He admits he tracked down Sal and Mueller in the hope that they would accompany him to collect the body of his son Larry Jr. and take him to his scheduled burial. Sal agrees, though Mueller is hesitant, claiming that Sal and Doc represent a dark period in his life. His wife urges him to do it, and he reluctantly agrees to accompany them.

Along the way, Sal and Mueller clash over their differing philosophies and their mutual guilt over their past; both Sal and Mueller (nicknamed the Mauler) indulged in alcohol, drugs and prostitutes while on deployment, and on one occasion used up the entire supply of then-19-year-old Doc's painkillers, which led to a needlessly painful death for one of their fellow Marines and a bad conduct discharge for Doc. Sal, who has no social filter from a head injury from the war, continually gets under Mueller's skin for having found religion, whilst Mueller expresses frustration at Sal's lack of maturity. At Dover Air Force Base, Doc requests to view the maimed body of his son, against the advice of Mueller and LtCol Willits. During the viewing, LCpl Charlie Washington, Larry Jr.'s close friend, reveals to Sal and Mueller that Larry Jr. had been killed while shopping at an Iraqi market, contrary to the official story of dying while fighting heroically; Sal reveals the truth to a disillusioned Doc, who refuses the Arlington National Cemetery burial and insists on giving Larry Jr. a civilian burial. Willits orders Washington to accompany the body and coerce Doc into changing his mind about having his son buried in civilian clothing.

Sal, Mueller and Doc begin a long road trip back home, waylaid by the Department of Homeland Security (alerted by their cash rental, vague destination and Mueller's praying) and a missed train in New York City. Over the course of the journey, the clashing becomes more good natured and Doc begins to boost in the company of his friends. Sal asks Doc to move to his town to run the bar with him, and the three purchase their first cell phones to stay in contact. Their trip takes them to Boston where Sal insists that they meet the mother of Jimmy Hightower, the fellow Marine who died painfully without morphine. When they arrive, they realise that Mrs. Hightower was given the same story about her son's heroism that Doc was given about Larry Jr.; Sal decides not to deny her the story and the trio pretend to have been the men that Hightower saved when he was killed in action.

The group return to Portsmouth for Larry Jr.'s funeral, and where Washington persuades Doc that Larry's civilian suit will be too small and he should be buried in his dress blues. At the burial, Sal and Mueller wear their uniforms, and participate in the flag-folding ceremony. Back at Doc's house, Washington gives Doc a letter from Larry Jr., claiming not to have read it. Doc reads his wishes: to be buried beside his mother wearing his uniform. Doc smiles as his son thanks him for being a great father.

== Cast ==
- Bryan Cranston as Sal Nealon
- Laurence Fishburne as Richard Mueller
- Steve Carell as Larry "Doc" Shepherd
- J. Quinton Johnson as Charlie Washington
- Deanna Reed-Foster as Ruth Mueller
- Cicely Tyson as Mrs. Hightower
- Yul Vazquez as Lieutenant Colonel Willits
- Graham Wolfe as John Redman
- Richard Robichaux as Anorak
- Lee Harrington as Jamie
- Kate Easton as Jackie
- Ted Watts Jr. (as Ted Watts) as Leland
- Jane Mowder as a Rental Truck Employee
- Marc Moore (as Marc Moore Jr) as a Hyped-up Employee
- Samuel Davis as Larry Jr. (voice)

== Production ==
In August 2016, it was announced that Richard Linklater would direct from a script co-written with Darryl Ponicsan, based on Ponicsan's novel, and Amazon Studios would produce and distribute the film. Bryan Cranston, Steve Carell, and Laurence Fishburne were the first actors cast in the film. In October 2016, J. Quinton Johnson joined the cast. Richard Robichaux's casting was announced in November. Principal photography began in November 2016 in Pittsburgh.

== Release ==
The film had its world premiere at the New York Film Festival on September 28, 2017. It was scheduled to be released on November 17, 2017, but was moved forward to November 3, 2017, when Lionsgate was announced to co-distribute the film alongside Amazon Studios.

== Reception ==
On review aggregator Rotten Tomatoes, the film has an approval rating of 77% based on 217 reviews, with an average rating of 7.1/10. The website's critical consensus reads, "Last Flag Flying balances raw drama against refreshing moments of humor in an impeccably cast film that wrestles with questions of patriotism, family, and grief." On Metacritic, the film has a weighted average score of 65 out of 100, based on 45 critics, indicating "generally favorable" reviews.

Writing for Rolling Stone, Peter Travers gave the film 3 out of 4 stars, praising the cast but criticizing some of the writing, saying, "Linklater can't protect them from all the script's potholes, including sentiment, contrivance and a galling mixed-message ending. But spending time in the company of Carell, Cranston and Fishburne? That truly is a pleasure."
