= The Imagemaker =

- Norwegian VHS cover
- Directed by: Hal Weiner
- Written by: Dick Goldberg; Hal Weiner
- Produced by: Hal Weiner; Marilyn Weiner
- Starring: Michael Nouri; Anne Twomey; Jerry Orbach; Jessica Harper; Farley Granger
- Cinematography: Jacques Haitkin
- Edited by: Terry Halle
- Music by: Fred Karns
- Production company: Melvyn J. Estrin Productions
- Distributed by: Castle Hill Productions
- Release date: March 7, 1986 (Los Angeles)
- Running time: 93 minutes
- Country: United States
- Language: English
- Budget: $850 000
- Box office: $24.562

The Imagemaker is a 1986 American political thriller film directed by Hal Weiner and starring Michael Nouri, Anne Twomey, Jerry Orbach, Jessica Harper and Farley Granger. It is the film debut of Marcia Gay Harden in a very minor role.

== Plot ==
Roger Blackwell has been a media advisor to countless politicians: probably one too many. He is set on using his experience to make a film about manipulation of the media by unscrupulous politicos.

== Cast ==
- Michael Nouri as Roger Blackwell
- Anne Twomey as Molly Grainger
- Jerry Orbach as Byron Caine
- Jessica Harper as Cynthia
- Farley Granger as Ambassador Robert Hoyle
- Richard Bauer as Morris Brodkin
- Roger Frazier as Victor Griffin
- Maury Povich as Talk-Show Host
- Patrick Blake as Martin
- Jerome Dempsey as Congressman Dave Lyons

== Credits ==
- Directed by Hal Weiner
- Written by Dick Goldberg and Hal Weiner
- Produced by Hal Weiner and Marilyn Weiner
- Music by Fred Karns
- Cinematography by Jacques Haitkin
- Editing by Terry Halle
- Casting by Lois Planco
- Production Design by Edward Pisoni
- Set Decoration by Henry Shaffer
- Costume Design by Catherine Adair
- Special Effects by Frank Rogers

== Filming ==
Filming took place in Washington, D.C.

== Release and reception ==
The film was theatrically released on March 7, 1986, in Los Angeles, California. It grossed $24.562 in the United States and Canada.

Nina Darnton from The New York Times said: "If this seems like somewhat bizarre behavior for the man who is supposed to save us from lies, politicians and media manipulation, be assured that it isn't the most confusing aspect of the film. Also puzzling is why actors as fine as Jerry Orbach and Jessica Harper, who valiantly cope with the fact that their characters make cardboard figures look complex by comparison, ever became involved with this project. Michael Nouri seems slightly uncomfortable as Roger Blackwell, but it is fair to say that on the whole the actors didn't seem quite as confused as the audience did".
