= Day One (1989 film) =

1989 film by Joseph Sargent

- Genre: Drama; History
- Based on: Day One: Before Hiroshima and After by Peter H. Wyden
- Teleplay by: David W. Rintels
- Directed by: Joseph Sargent
- Starring: Brian Dennehy; David Strathairn; Michael Tucker; Hume Cronyn; Richard Dysart; Hal Holbrook; Barnard Hughes; John McMartin; David Ogden Stiers; Anne Twomey
- Music by: Mason Daring
- Country of origin: United States
- Original language: English

Production
- Executive producers: Aaron Spelling; E. Duke Vincent
- Producers: Josette Perrotta; David W. Rintels
- Cinematography: Kees Van Oostrum
- Editor: Debra Karen
- Running time: 145 mins.
- Production companies: AT&T; Spelling Television; World International Network

Original release
- Network: CBS
- Release: March 5, 1989

Day One is a made-for-TV docudrama film about the Manhattan Project, the research and development of the atomic bomb during World War II. It is based on the book by Peter H. Wyden. The film was written by David W. Rintels and directed by Joseph Sargent. It starred Brian Dennehy as General Leslie Groves, David Strathairn as Dr. J. Robert Oppenheimer and Michael Tucker as Dr. Leo Szilard. It premiered in the United States on March 5, 1989 on the CBS network. It won the Primetime Emmy Award for Outstanding Drama/ or Comedy Special at the 41st Primetime Emmy Awards in 1989. The movie received critical acclaim for its historical accuracy despite being a dramatization.

== Plot ==
Hungarian physicist Leo Szilard flees Germany on the last train out and leaves Europe during World War II. He attempts to convince the military in England that a nuclear bomb can be built and that the Germans are already working on it. His idea is filed and ignored. He eventually arrives in the United States where, with the help of Albert Einstein, he persuades the Federal government after a year to build an atomic bomb. The Manhattan Project is started and General Leslie Groves selects physicist J. Robert Oppenheimer to head the Los Alamos Laboratory in New Mexico, where the bomb is built. As World War II draws to a close, Szilard (whose idea was responsible for the progress made) has second thoughts about atomic weapons and debates how and when to use the bom

As Germany is being defeated and its scientists interrogated, it is found out that they have not even come close to constructing a nuclear bomb (partly due to bad cooperation by scientists). Despite the fact that no one has the technology now, and the original reason for the Manhattan Project is gone, work continues. Szilard, who first used Einstein to get his ideas about building a bomb across to the US leaders, now convinces him to join him in writing a letter to President Harry S. Truman to do the opposite, namely not to build the bomb, in order to avoid an arms race. 68 scientists sign a petition, but that is held back by the military.

U.S. President Truman is faced with four options: peace talks (which would require the Japanese to keep their emperor, as eventually happened), a blockade (which was thought to be cowardly), an invasion (estimated by some to cost up to a million lives, though such numbers have been widely disputed), or dropping the bomb. Another consideration is that the USSR had said they would enter the war against Japan three months after the surrender of Germany and there is a fear that they might not leave. So Truman decides that the best course of action is to drop the bomb on Hiroshima, against the advice of General Dwight D. Eisenhower.

== Cast ==
- Brian Dennehy as General Leslie Groves
- David Strathairn as J. Robert Oppenheimer
- Michael Tucker as Leo Szilard
- Hume Cronyn as James F. Byrnes
- Richard Dysart as President Harry S. Truman
- Hal Holbrook as General George Marshall
- Barnard Hughes as Secretary of War Henry Stimson
- John McMartin as Arthur Compton
- David Ogden Stiers as President Franklin D. Roosevelt
- Anne Twomey as Kitty Oppenheimer
- Olek Krupa as Edward Teller
- Alan Scarfe as Ernest Lawrence
- Tony Shalhoub as Enrico Fermi
- Stephan Balint as Eugene Wigner
- John Pielmeier as Seth Neddermeyer
- Peter Boretski as Albert Einstein
- Patrick Breen as Richard Feynman
- Vlasta Vrána as Hans Bethe
- Michael Sinelnikoff as Ernest Rutherford
- Nicholas Kilbertus as Paul Tibbets
- Ester Spitz as Trude Weiss

== Production ==
In order to depict a desert setting, certain scenes of the film were filmed in a town named Notre Dame de Lourdes, located in the province of Quebec. The town offered a wide expanse of sand quarry that was used for filming.

== See also ==
- The Beginning or the End, 1947 docudrama film about the Manhattan Project.
- Oppenheimer, 1980 biographical television series about J. Robert Oppenheimer (Sam Waterston) and the project to build the atomic bomb.
- Fat Man and Little Boy, 1989 film about the Manhattan Project, starring Paul Newman as General Leslie Groves and Dwight Schultz as Oppenheimer
- Nuclear Secrets, 2007 TV mini-series with two episodes dedicated to the Manhattan Project
- Manhattan, 2014-15 television series set at the Manhattan Project
- Oppenheimer, 2023 film about Oppenheimer (Cillian Murphy) and the Manhattan Project
