= Nuts (1987 film) =

1987 Martin Ritt film

- Theatrical release poster
- Directed by: Martin Ritt
- Written by: Tom Topor; Darryl Ponicsan; Alvin Sargent
- Based on: Nuts by Tom Topor
- Produced by: Barbra Streisand
- Starring: Barbra Streisand; Richard Dreyfuss; Maureen Stapleton; Eli Wallach; Robert Webber; James Whitmore; Karl Malden
- Cinematography: Andrzej Bartkowiak
- Edited by: Sidney Levin
- Music by: Barbra Streisand
- Production company: Barwood Films
- Distributed by: Warner Bros.
- Release date: December 11, 1987
- Running time: 116 minutes
- Country: United States
- Language: English
- Budget: $25 million
- Box office: $31 million

Nuts is a 1987 American legal drama film directed by Martin Ritt, starring Barbra Streisand and Richard Dreyfuss. The screenplay by Tom Topor, Darryl Ponicsan and Alvin Sargent is based on Topor's 1979 stageplay, Nuts. Nuts was the final film for veteran actors Karl Malden and Robert Webber. The movie also featured Leslie Nielsen in his final non-comedic role.

== Plot ==
When call girl Claudia Draper kills client Allen Green in self-defense, her mother Rose and stepfather Arthur Kirk attempt to have her declared mentally incompetent by Dr. Herbert Morrison in order to avoid a public scandal. Claudia knows that if her parents succeed, she will be remanded to a mental institution indefinitely, so she is determined to prove she is sane enough to stand trial.

The attorney her parents hire to defend her quits after Claudia assaults him in the courtroom for moving to have her committed. The judge appoints public defender Aaron Levinsky to handle her case, as he happens to be in the courtroom. Although he is overbooked, he refuses to engage with the other lawyers without speaking to the defendant personally. Claudia resists him and is openly hostile until she finally accepts that he is on her side.

Levinsky begins to probe her background to determine how the child of supposedly model upper middle class parents could find herself in this situation, and with each piece of her past he uncovers, he receives additional, disturbing insight into what brought Claudia to this crossroads in her life.

In the psych ward where she is being held, she has a nightmare reliving what happened the day she killed the man in self-defense. He began to physically attack her when she refused to spend more time with him and allow him to bathe her.

When her mother gets up on the stand, which Claudia was opposed to, Claudia has a flashback. In it, she is very upset crying in her bedroom, and her mother closes the door on her, ignoring her.

When her stepfather is on the stand, during the cross-examination, it is revealed that Arthur molested Claudia as a child until she was 16. Claudia has a flashback with someone trying to force himself into the bathroom. The mother gets visibly upset with this line of questioning, and Claudia also acts traumatized.

Finally, Claudia takes the stand in her own defense and asserts that she is not insane simply because she doesn't fit society's image of what a woman should be.

In the end, the judge decides she is competent to stand trial, and she leaves the courtroom on her own recognizance while she awaits her trial.

The movie ends with information stating Claudia stood trial for first-degree manslaughter, with Levinsky as her attorney, and she was acquitted.

== Cast ==
- Barbra Streisand as Claudia Draper
- Richard Dreyfuss as Aaron Levinsky
- Maureen Stapleton as Rose Kirk
- Karl Malden as Arthur Kirk
- Eli Wallach as Dr. Herbert Morrison
- Robert Webber as Francis MacMillan
- James Whitmore as Judge Stanley Murdoch
- Leslie Nielsen as Allen Green
- William Prince as Clarence Middleton
- Dakin Matthews as Judge Lawrence Box
- Elizabeth Hoffman as Dr. Johnson

== Production ==
In 1980, Universal Pictures purchased the film rights to Tom Topor's off-off-Broadway play Nuts and financed its move to Broadway. The studio greenlighted the film adaptation in January 1982 and announced Mark Rydell would produce and direct Debra Winger in the relatively low-budget film. Barbra Streisand had campaigned for the role, but filming was scheduled to begin in the summer of 1982 and Rydell was unwilling to postpone the project while she completed Yentl.

Universal was concerned about the controversial nature of Nuts and eventually sold the rights to Warner Bros., where it remained in limbo until 1986, when Streisand was signed for $5 million plus a percentage of the gross. Topor and Rydell clashed about the film's focus and eventually Rydell quit, citing scheduling problems, budgetary concerns, and artistic differences. It was the second time that he had abandoned a Streisand property; a decade earlier, he had walked away from A Star Is Born. Streisand assumed producing duties but declined to direct, and Martin Ritt was hired to replace Rydell. Streisand hired Andrzej Bartkowiak, who had filmed the documentary chronicling the making of The Broadway Album, as director of photography. She researched her role by studying schizophrenic patients in a mental ward and interviewing prostitutes at a Los Angeles brothel, and she began writing her own draft of the screenplay. Although she received no screen credit for her work, the studio later publicly acknowledged her contribution.

Richard Dreyfuss was offered the role of Aaron Levinsky, but he initially passed. Dustin Hoffman was interested in the part but Warner refused to meet his artistic and salary demands. At various times it was reported Marlon Brando, Paul Newman, and Al Pacino were all considered. Dreyfuss was asked again and he accepted; filming was postponed again to allow him to complete his role in Tin Men.

Nuts also has the distinction of featuring Leslie Nielsen's final dramatic film role. After his appearance in Airplane! (1980) Nielsen had reinvented himself as a comedic actor and following his role in Nuts he starred in The Naked Gun.

Aside from a few days of exterior shooting in Manhattan, the film, budgeted at $25 million, was shot in Los Angeles. Principal photography began on October 6, 1986, and ended in early February 1987. When the film previewed in October 1987, audience feedback was very positive, leading Streisand to believe it was powerful enough to sell itself. She refused to promote it other than a three-part interview with Gene Shalit on The Today Show, but she later participated in a press conference when the film was released in foreign markets.

== Critical reception ==
On the review aggregator website Rotten Tomatoes, 41% of 26 critics' reviews are positive, with an average rating of 5.3/10.

Janet Maslin of The New York Times wrote "The film is almost entirely adrift. A group of three screenwriters...have not succeeded in giving it any momentum at all...The material is exceptionally talky and becalmed, the central question none too compelling, and the visual style distractingly cluttered...Still, Miss Streisand...manages to be every inch the star."

Roger Ebert of the Chicago Sun-Times rated the film two out of four stars and noted that "the movie's revelations are told in such dreary, clichéd, weather-beaten old movie terms that we hardly care...As the courtroom drama slogs its weary way home, Streisand's authentic performance as a madwoman seems harder and harder to sustain...Nuts is essentially just a futile exercise in courtroom cliches, surrounding a good performance that doesn't fit."

Rita Kempley of The Washington Post called the film "a consistent character study, paced like a good thriller" and cited Barbra Streisand's "bravissimo performance". She added "She is so dazzling, in fact, that she blinds us to the pat psychology of the facile script...There's heat in the moment, but there's nothing to chew on afterward...Nuts is less than the sum of its illustrious parts. Despite all its achievements, it's ultimately hollow inside, like a cake at a bachelor party. The filmmakers never quite succeed in their larger purpose: pitting inner truths against outward appearances to force us to decide who is and is not nuts. It wants to be a movie with a message, but in the end it's just a melodrama." Desson Howe of The Washington Post wrote "[I]t's Hollywood manipulation at its best. You're given little emotional tidbits along the way until the high point."

Jonathan Rosenbaum of the Chicago Reader wrote "While the movie holds one's attention throughout, and its liberal message is compelling, we are clued in to certain facts about the heroine so early on that the audience is never really tested along with the characters. What might have been a sharper existential confrontation of our received ideas about sanity merely comes across as an effective courtroom drama, with strategically placed revelations and climaxes."

== Accolades ==
The film was nominated for the Golden Globe Award for Best Motion Picture – Drama. Streisand was nominated for the Golden Globe Award for Best Actress – Motion Picture Drama, and for the David di Donatello for Best Foreign Actress. Dreyfuss was nominated for the Golden Globe Award for Best Supporting Actor – Motion Picture.

== Home media ==
Warner Home Video released the film on Region 1 DVD on July 1, 2003. It is in anamorphic widescreen format with audio tracks in English and French and subtitles in English, French, and Spanish. Bonus features include commentary by Barbra Streisand and a production stills gallery.
