= Anne Twomey (actress) =

American actress

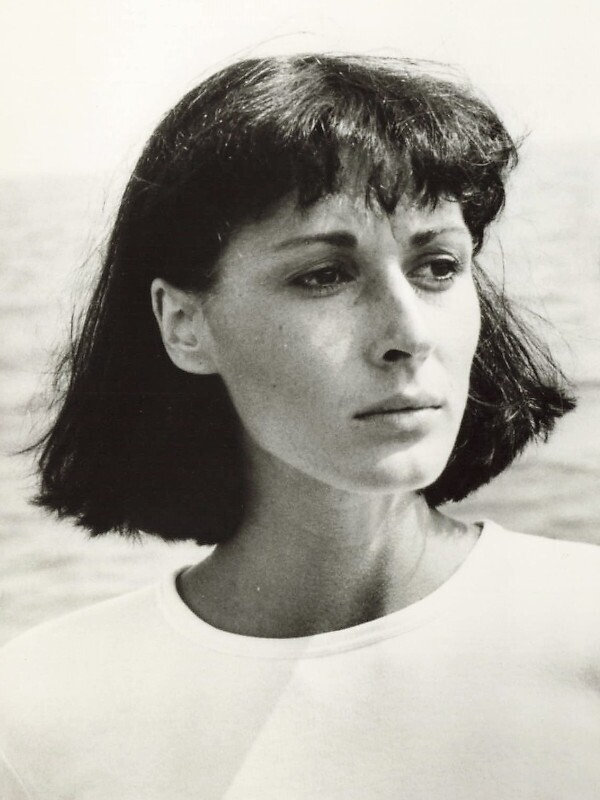
- Twomey in 1984
- Born: June 7, 1951 (age 75); Boston, Massachusetts, U.S.
- Education: Temple University
- Occupation: Actress
- Years active: 1980–2003
- Spouse: John Bedford Lloyd (m. 1986)
- Children: 2

Anne Carolyn Twomey (born June 7, 1951) is an American former actress. She earned critical acclaim for her performance in the 1980 play Nuts, for which she won the Theatre World Award and was nominated for the Tony Award for Best Performance by a Leading Actress in a Play.

== Life and career ==
Twomey is a graduate of Temple University.

Twomey's Broadway credits include To Grandmother's House We Go (1981) and Tennessee Williams' Orpheus Descending (1989). Off-Broadway she appeared in Vieux Carré (1983), also by Williams, which garnered her a Drama Desk Award nomination for Outstanding Featured Actress in a Play, and The Vampires (1984).

Twomey's feature film credits include Deadly Friend (1986), Last Rites (1988), The Scout (1994), Picture Perfect (1997), and The Confession (1999).

Twomey had recurring roles in the 1993 season of L.A. Law and the 2000–01 season of Third Watch. She has made guest appearances on Shannon, The Cosby Show, The Twilight Zone, Magnum, P.I., Seinfeld, Spin City, Law & Order, Law & Order: Special Victims Unit, and Law & Order: Criminal Intent, and had a featured role in the 1998 television remake of Rear Window starring Christopher Reeve and Daryl Hannah.

Twomey has narrated several audiobooks, including works by Dean Koontz, Joyce Carol Oates, Tracy Chevalier, and M. T. Anderson.

Twomey has worked with prisoners at Rehabilitation Through the Arts.

Twomey married actor John Bedford Lloyd in New York City on August 23, 1986. They have two daughters together, Hannah and Elizabeth.

== Filmography ==
=== Film ===
Anne Twomey film credits
Year	Title	Role	Notes
1986	The Imagemaker	Molly Grainger	
1986	Deadly Friend	Jeannie Conway	
1988	Last Rites	Zena	
1994	The Scout	Jennifer	
1997	Picture Perfect	Sela	
1999	The Confession	Judge Judy Crossland	

=== Television ===
Anne Twomey television credits
Year	Title	Role	Notes
1982	Shannon		Episode: "Curtain Calls"
1984	American Playhouse	Jean	Episode: "Refuge"
1984	The Cosby Show	Mrs. Jennings	Episode: "You're Not a Mother Night"
1985	No Complaints!	Joanna Newman	TV movie
1985	The Twilight Zone	Nola Granville	Episode: "Her Pilgrim Soul"
1985	Behind Enemy Lines	Helen Isaacs	TV movie
1987	Home	Maggie Costigan	TV movie
1987	Magnum, P.I.	Alicia Maxfield	Episode: "Murder by Night"
1987	Everything's Relative		Episode: "It's a Business Doing Pleasure with You"
1988	The Equalizer	Meredith Browning	Episode: "Always a Lady"
1989	Day One	Kitty Openheimer	TV movie
1990	Orpheus Descending	Carol Cutrere	TV movie
1991	Bump in the Night	Sarah	TV movie
1992	The Secret	Dr. Meyers	TV movie
1992	Seinfeld	Rita	Episode: "The Virgin"
1993	Seinfeld	Rita	Episode: "The Pilot"
1993	L.A. Law	Linda Salerno	Recurring role (5 episodes)
1995	New York News		Episode: "Cost of Living"
1995	Law & Order	Mrs. Harlan	Episode: "Hot Pursuit"
1996	Law & Order	Kate Bergreen-Spiegel	Episode: "Family Business"
1997	Spin City	Holly Cohen	Episode: "An Affair to Remember"
1998	Rear Window	Leila	TV movie
1999	Law & Order	Pepper Garrison	Episode: "Merger"
2000	Law & Order: Special Victims Unit	Sharon Hadley	Episode: "Misleader"
2000	Wonderland	Judge Manheim	Episode: "20/20 Hindsight"
2000–01	Third Watch	Catherine Zambrano	Recurring Role (7 episodes)
2003	Law & Order: Criminal Intent	Lyz Webster	Episode: "The Gift"
2003	Hack	Mrs. Farrel	Episode: "The Looking Glass"

== Theatre ==
Year	Title	Role	Notes
1980	Nuts	Claudia Faith Draper	
1981	To Grandmother's House We Go	Beatrice	
1989	Orpheus Descending	Carol Cutrere	
