= Landscape of the Body =

Play written by John Guare

Landscape of the Body is a two-act play by John Guare, first performed in 1977.

== Synopsis ==
The play is episodic and non-linear, as it travels back and forth in time. The plot centers on a woman named Betty, whose son, Bert, was recently murdered and decapitated in lower Manhattan. The location of the first and last scenes are the same. They take place on a boat, with Betty, who throws bottles filled with notes overboard, and an absurdly disguised Detective Holahan. Initially, Holahan accuses Betty of killing her son, but Betty insists this is not true. The audience later finds out, indeed, this is not true, as it is revealed that Bert's friend, Donny, killed him. Betty, whose past is dramatized in chunks, came to New York from Bangor, Maine, after having been sent to fetch her sister Rosalie, who has been acting in porn films. Incidentally, Rosalie gets hit by a bicycle and dies, so Betty takes Rosalie's place in life: she takes her job as both a worker for a Honeymoon Agency and a porn actress, dates Rosalie's Cuban boyfriend Raulito, and lives in New York with Bert. Bert, with his group of friends (Donny, Margie and Joanne) become hoodlums to some extent, as he and Donny lure men into their house and hit them over the head with a wrench so they can steal their watches. A childhood friend, Durwood Peach, confronts Betty after years of non-communication, claiming that his doctor said it would be best for him to propose to Betty, being that she has been the true love of his life his whole life. She goes with him down south, just to find that Durwood's parents just needed Durwood to return, and that she is not wanted. She goes back up to New York to find that Bert and Raulito both have been killed (the latter killed as a result of an inadvertent bank-robbery prank pulled by Bert).

== Performance history ==
Landscape of the Body was first produced by William Gardner at the Academy Festival Theatre, in Lake Forest, Illinois, in July 1977. It was directed by John Pasquin, with the cast that featured Shirley Knight starred as Betty, F. Murray Abraham as Holahan, Paul McCrane as Bert, Rex Robbins as Durwood Peach, Jay O. Sanders as the Bike Messenger/Dope King/Bank Teller, Bonnie Deroski as Margie, Alexa Kenin as Joanne, Anthony Marciona as Donny, Richard Bauer as Raulito, and Peg Murray as Rosalie. The play ran three hours with intermission.

The play was presented Off-Broadway by Joseph Papp, at the Public Theater, running from September 27, 1977 to November 20, 1977. The lead roles were played by the same actors with Remak Ramsay as Durwood Peach, and Tom Klunis as Bike Messenger/Dope King/Bank Teller. Richard Bauer won the 1978 Obie Award, Performance,

The first production in London, UK, opened at the Southwark Playhouse on March 29, 2001, directed by Joss Bennathan, with Holley Chant as Betty, Shaun Hennessy as Holahan, Elliott Young as Bert, Fredrick Ruth as Durwood Peach and Pianist, Jamie Lennox Scholes as Donny/Masked Man/Dope King, Elizabeth Kiernan as Margie/Bank Teller, Carol Duval as Joanne, Gary Condes as Raulito and Elizabeth Yeats as Rosalie.

The play was produced Off-Broadway by Second Stage Theatre at the McGinn-Cazale Theatre in April 1984. Directed by Gary Sinise, the cast featured Dann Florek (Captain Holahan), Christine Lahti (Betty), and Christian Slater (Bert).

The play was produced at the Yale Repertory Theater from in May 1996. Directed by Mark Rucker, the cast featured Laura Linney as Betty, Candy Buckley as Rosalie, and Reg Rogers as the police officer.

The play ran at the Williamstown Theatre Festival from July 9 to July 20, 2003. Directed by Michael Greif the cast featured Sherie Rene Scott as Rosalie, Lili Taylor as Betty and Paul Sparks as Captain Marvin Holahan.

The play was produced Off-Broadway from March 28, 2006 to May 28, 2006 by the Signature Theatre Company. Directed by Michael Greif the cast starred Jonathan Fried as Durwood Peach, Paul Iacono as Donny, Colby Minifie as Margie, Stephen Scott Scarpulla as Bert, Sherie Rene Scott as Rosalie, Brian Sgambati as Masked Man/Dope King of Providence/and others, Jill Shackner as Joanne, Paul Sparks as Captain Marvin Holahan, Lili Taylor as Betty, and Bernard White as Raulito. This production was nominated for a 2007 Lucille Lortel Award, Outstanding Revival. Sherie Rene Scott won the 2006 Obie Award for Outstanding Performance and 2007 Lucille Lortel Award, Outstanding Featured Actress.

== Critical response ==
In reviewing the 1977 production, Edith Oliver, reviewing for the New Yorker "commended Guare for his imaginative vision and resourcefullness", and Alvin Klein in The New York Theatre Review noted the play's "dazzling prediliction for normalizing the offbeat aspects of humanity."

Alvin Klein, in his review of the Yale Repertory production for The New York Times wrote that "it is an important revival of an important play."

Ben Brantley, in his review of the 2006 production for The New York Times, called the production a "terrific revival", a "delirious heartbreaker of a comedy... directed with equal measures of sensationalism and sensitivity by Michael Greif, "Landscape" identifies the human condition as an almost unbearable wistfulness."

The CurtainUp reviewer of the 2006 production wrote: "This is a peculiar but extremely thoughtful play, and Signature is to be commended for bringing it to us. It informs our understanding of the playwright we know best in terms of his masterpieces, 'Six Degrees of Separation' and 'House of Blue Leaves'. But 'Landscape of the Body' deserves better than it gets here."
