= Tom Topor =

American dramatist

- Born: 1938 (age 87–88); Vienna, Austria
- Occupations: playwright; screenwriter; novelist
- Writing career
- Language: English
- Genres: theatre, film, fiction

Tom Topor (born 1938) is an American playwright, screenwriter, and novelist. Topor was born in Vienna, Austria, and he was brought to London in 1939, where he remained until he came to New York City in 1949. He earned his bachelor's degree at Brooklyn College in 1961.

Topor is the author of the 1979 play Nuts and the screenplay for the 1987 film, which became a starring vehicle for Barbra Streisand. He also wrote the screenplay for the 1988 film The Accused, which starred Jodie Foster. He won the Writers Guild of America Award for his screenplay for the 1990 television film Judgment, which he also directed. In 1996, he won the Dilys Award for his novel The Codicil.

Topor's works tend to involve courtroom drama, psychological drama, docudrama, melodrama, social problems, crime, and/or issues of sexual abuse. Before his career as an author, he was a reporter for the New York Post, covering stories in police stations, courtrooms, hospitals, and psychiatric wards. He also did some reporting for the New York Daily News and the New York Times.

His career as a playwright began in 1969 with a series of one-act plays staged Off-Off-Broadway. This culminated in a run of his play Nuts on Broadway from April 28, 1980, into August of that year. Anne Twomey, in the lead role, received a Tony Award nomination for her performance. The play was published in 1981, and was made into a film of the same name starring Barbra Streisand and Richard Dreyfuss in 1987, with Topor himself adapting it into a screenplay.

Topor's other plays include Answers, Romance: Here to Stay, But Not for Me, Coda (L'Orchestre des ombres in French), Up the Hill, and The Playpen. His other novels include Tightrope Minor and Bloodstar. His additional screenplays and teleplays include Word of Honor (co-writer) and Perfect Murder, Perfect Town (from the book by Lawrence Schiller).
