= Innocence (2013 film) =

- Directed by: Hilary Brougher
- Written by: Hilary Brougher; Tristine Skyler
- Based on: Innocence by Jane Mendelsohn
- Produced by: Christine Vachon; Jane Mendelsohn; Pamela Koffler; Michael Heller
- Starring: Kelly Reilly; Sophie Curtis; Graham Phillips; Linus Roache; Sarah Sutherland; Stephanie March; Perrey Reeves; Liya Kebede; Sarita Choudhury; Annie Q. Mikal Evans; Daniel Zovatto; Evelina Turen; Rachel Heller; Noelle Beck; Kelly Bensimon
- Cinematography: David Rush Morrison
- Edited by: Keith Reamer
- Music by: tomandandy
- Production companies: Big Indie Pictures; Killer Films; Scion Pictures
- Release dates: October 26, 2013 (Austin Film Festival); September 5, 2014 (United States)
- Running time: 96 minutes
- Country: United States
- Language: English
- Box office: $289,613

Innocence is a 2013 American horror drama film directed by Hilary Brougher, who co-wrote the film with Tristine Skyler. The movie is based on the 2000 novel of the same name by Jane Mendelsohn. It had its world premiere on October 26, 2013, at the Austin Film Festival and received a limited theatrical release in the United States on September 5, 2014. The movie stars Sophie Curtis, Kelly Reilly, Graham Phillips, Linus Roache, Sarah Sutherland and Stephanie March.

== Plot ==
Beckett is a teenager mourning the loss of her mother. She's moved to the Upper West Side of Manhattan with her father Miles and is set to begin school at Hamilton, an exclusive prep school. Beckett is so engrossed in her grief that she fails to notice that her school is a little stranger than most schools, as its students are prone to suicides and is full of extraordinarily beautiful female teachers.

Things grow worse when the school nurse Pamela decides to move in with Beckett and Miles, especially since Pamela keeps instructing Beckett to remain a virgin. What Beckett doesn't know is that Pamela and the other school staff are all incarnations of Lamia, a former queen of Libya, and must kill and drink the blood of virgins to retain their immortal existence.

== Cast ==
- Sophie Curtis as Beckett Warner
- Kelly Reilly as Pamela Hamilton
- Graham Phillips as Tobey Crawford
- Linus Roache as Miles Warner
- Sarah Sutherland as Jen Dunham
- Stephanie March as Natalie Crawford
- Perrey Reeves as Ava Dunham

== Reception ==
Critical reception for Innocence has been predominantly negative. It holds an approval rating of 15% at Rotten Tomatoes, based on 20 reviews, with an average rating of 3.3/10. On Metacritic, the film has weighted average rating of 26 out of 100, based on 13 reviews, indicating "generally unfavorable" reviews. The New York Times criticized the film's acting and soundtrack, while the Las Vegas Weekly criticized it for relying overly much on "worn-out horror cliches" - a criticism shared by the Fort Worth Star-Telegram.
