= Deck the Halls (disambiguation) =

"Deck the Halls" is a Christmas carol.

Deck the Halls may also refer to:

- Deck the Halls (2005 film), a Canadian made-for-TV Christmas film starring Gabrielle Carteris and Steve Bacic
- Deck the Halls (2006 film), an American family comedy film starring Danny DeVito and Matthew Broderick
- Deck the Halls (novel), a 2003 thriller by Mary Higgins Clark and Carol Higgins Clark
  - Deck the Halls (2011 film), a made-for-TV film based on the 2003 novel, directed by Ron Underwood
- "Deck the Halls" (The Fresh Prince of Bel-Air), a 1990 television episode
- "Deck the Halls", a song by XO-IQ, featured in the television series Make It Pop

== See also ==
- Deck the Halls, Bruise Your Hand, an album by Relient K
