= Tourist Trap (1979 film) =

1979 American supernatural slasher film by David Schmoeller

- Theatrical release poster
- Directed by: David Schmoeller
- Written by: David Schmoeller; J. Larry Carroll
- Based on: The Spider Will Kill You by David Schmoeller
- Produced by: J. Larry Carroll
- Starring: Chuck Connors; Jocelyn Jones; Jon Van Ness; Robin Sherwood; Tanya Roberts; Dawn Jeffory; Keith McDermott
- Cinematography: Nicholas von Sternberg
- Edited by: Ted Nicolaou
- Music by: Pino Donaggio
- Production companies: Manson International; Charles Band Productions
- Distributed by: Compass International Pictures
- Release date: March 14, 1979 (Los Angeles)
- Running time: 90 minutes
- Country: United States
- Language: English
- Budget: $350,000
- Box office: $4 million

Tourist Trap is a 1979 American supernatural slasher film directed by David Schmoeller and starring Chuck Connors, Jocelyn Jones, Jon Van Ness, Robin Sherwood, and Tanya Roberts. The film follows a group of young people who stumble upon a roadside museum run by Mr. Slausen, a lonely eccentric, where an unknown killer with psychokinetic powers begins to murder them.

Schmoeller co-wrote the screenplay with J. Larry Carroll who served as producer for the film alongside Charles Band in association with Manson International. It was adapted from Schmoeller's short film The Spider Will Kill You (1976). Principal photography took place in Los Angeles in the spring of 1978, with Robert A. Burns serving as the film's production designer.

Compass International Pictures, who had recently released the hit Halloween (1978), distributed the film, releasing it in the United States on March 14, 1979. The film was a modest box office success, grossing $4 million against its $350,000 budget. Despite its grotesque subject matter and depictions of violence, the film was given a PG rating by the Motion Picture Association of America, which resulted in it being frequently broadcast on live television in the years following its theatrical release. In the United Kingdom, the film was released under the alternate title Nightmare of Terror. While it received mixed reviews from film critics at the time, Tourist Trap has garnered praise from modern reviewers for its surrealistic elements and unique plot.

== Plot ==
Eileen and her boyfriend Woody are driving through a secluded rural area. When their car gets a flat tire, Woody goes to find a gas station. Their friends Becky, Jerry and Molly, are traveling in a different vehicle. They reach Eileen and all drive off to pick up Woody. Meanwhile, Woody has found a gas station that appears deserted. He enters the back room but becomes trapped by an unseen force. Various mannequins appear and cackle as objects fly off the shelves at him until a metal pipe impales and kills him.

The others find Slausen's Lost Oasis, a tourist trap, but their vehicle mysteriously breaks down. Jerry tries to fix the car and the girls go skinny dipping. Mr. Slausen—the owner of the tourist trap—appears, holding a shotgun. He seems embittered by the decline of his business since the construction of a new freeway. The girls apologize for trespassing.

Slausen offers to help Jerry with the car, but insists the group go to his house with him to get his tools. There, they see the tourist trap: animated waxwork figures. Eileen is curious about a nearby house, but Slausen insists that the women should stay inside the museum. He takes Jerry to fix their car. Eileen leaves to find a phone in the other house. There, she finds mannequins and a stranger wearing a grotesque mask appears behind her. Various items in the room move of their own accord, and the scarf Eileen is wearing strangles her to death.

Slausen returns, saying that Jerry drove into town. When the others tell him that Eileen left, he goes to the house and finds Eileen has been turned into a mannequin. He returns and tells Molly and Becky he did not find Eileen. Frustrated, the women leave to search for her themselves. Becky enters the house and finds a mannequin resembling Eileen. She is attacked by the masked killer and multiple mannequins. She later wakes up tied in the basement with Jerry. Jerry says the killer is Slausen's brother Davey. There is another captive, Tina, who is strapped to a table. She is killed by the masked man. Jerry frees himself and attacks the killer but is overpowered.

Molly is pursued by the masked man. She meets Slausen, who drives her to the museum and gives her a gun while he goes inside. The masked man appears and Molly shoots, but the gun is loaded with blanks. Molly then bashes the man in the head with the butt of the shotgun, to which he then brushes off the rest of his mask with his hands, revealing himself to be Slausen. Molly is soon captured and restrained to a bed.

Becky and Jerry escape from the basement but get separated. Slausen takes Becky back to the museum. There, she is shot at by figures of American Civil War soldiers, one of which being a replica of General Custer, before she is killed by an Indian chief figure who throws a knife at her, stabbing her in the back of the head. Back at the house, Jerry arrives to rescue Molly, but he has unknowingly turned into a mannequin. Slausen dances with the figure of his wife, and Molly sees that the wife has become animated. Traumatized, she kills Slausen with an axe.

The following morning, a now-insane Molly drives away with the mannequin versions of her friends.

== Cast ==
- Chuck Connors as Mr. Slausen
- Shailar Coby as Davey Slausen (Note: Despite the film's official billing, the actor credited as "Shailar Coby" does not exist; it is a pseudonym and portmanteau of star Chuck Connors's sons' first names, and was devised to mislead audiences from discovering the film's twist ending. It is in fact Connors who portrays both Davey and Mr. Slausen.)
- Jocelyn Jones as Molly
- Jon Van Ness as Jerry
- Robin Sherwood as Eileen
- Tanya Roberts as Becky
- Dawn Jeffory-Nelson as Tina
- Keith McDermott as Woody
- Linnea Quigley as a Mannequin (uncredited)

== Production ==
=== Development ===
The screenplay for Tourist Trap was written by David Schmoeller and J. Larry Carroll, with the stated goal of getting into filmmaking that saw them draw from The Texas Chain Saw Massacre (1974) and the short film that Schmoeller had directed with The Spider Will Kill You for his thesis film at the University of Texas at Austin. Schmoeller had drew inspiration from the surrealist films of Alejandro Jodorowsky and Luis Buñuel, as well as his observations of store mannequins in a JCPenney department store. They pitched the film to producers Samuel Z. Arkoff, Bruce Cohn Curtis, and Charles Band. Apparently, John Carpenter was once rumored to direct the film, with Carroll claiming a lack of satisfaction with the financial arrangements (Schmoeller stated that he had received a call from a colleague that heard about a rumor of Carpenter doing a re-write for Curtis while the two were a few weeks from starting principal photography).

The original screenplay did not feature the telekinetic powers. According to Carroll, the idea was proposed by Band, who insisted it be implemented into the script.

=== Casting ===
The production did not appoint a casting director for the film, instead relying on independent talent agents to help cast the roles. Schmoeller said that $50,000 of the film's budget was dedicated to salary for the lead actor portraying the villain, Mr. Slausen. The role was offered to several older Hollywood actors, such as Jack Palance and Gig Young, but both turned the project down. Chuck Connors, who was the production crew's third choice for the role, finally accepted the role.

According to Schmoeller, each of the actors in the film aside from Connors auditioned for their parts. Jocelyn Jones was cast as the female lead, Molly, after Schmoeller had seen some of her previous performances, while Tanya Roberts was given the role of Becky. Jon Van Ness and Robin Sherwood were given the roles of Jerry and Eileen, respectively.

In order to avoid prematurely revealing the twist that Davey and Mr. Slausen are the same person with dissociative identity disorder, Chuck Connors is credited as playing Mr. Slausen under his real name, but his credit for Davey uses the pseudonym "Shailar Coby" (derived from the first and middle name of Schmoeller's son).

=== Filming ===
Tourist Trap was filmed in 24 days in Los Angeles County, California, with additional interiors shot at Rampart Sound Studios in Los Angeles. Principal photography began on March 27, 1978. A portion of the interior scenes were shot at an abandoned house located at 5255 Hollywood Boulevard which was scheduled for demolition. Schmoeller made arrangements with the contractor to postpone the demolition of the building for five days, during which time the crew shot footage. By using the abandoned location, the production saved an estimated $30,000 in set construction and soundstage fees. Future director, Ron Underwood, was the first assistant director and David Wyler, the son of William Wyler, served as second assistant director, while the director of photography was Nicholas von Sternberg, son of director Josef von Sternberg.

Production designer Robert A. Burns, who had worked on Tobe Hooper's The Texas Chain Saw Massacre (1974) and Wes Craven's The Hills Have Eyes (1977), handled the art direction—and the majority of the special effects—on Tourist Trap, including the mannequins and their physical manipulations. To accomplish the poltergeist-like effects in the film's opening scene, the set was constructed at a rotated 90 degrees; this allowed items to be hurled by the crew from the cabinet—which was, in fact, anchored to the ceiling—to the floor, which appeared on camera as a wall. Other special effects were accomplished with the use of wires. For the death sequence of Tanya Roberts's character Becky, for example, a block of wood was taped behind Roberts's hair; a knife attached to a wire was hurled at the back of her head, which stuck into the wooden block.

Actress Dawn Jeffory-Nelson, whose character is suffocated in the film during the making of a plaster mould of her face, recalled how the scene was accomplished: "It was either mashed potatoes or whipped cream being put on my face. I can’t remember which. I probably had to act out my death five to eight times. Not having suffocated or died of a heart attack—thank God!—I did some research on the breathing and what happens to the body. You suspend your disbelief, and you go for it."

Schmoeller recalled the filming process as being a "learning" experience as he was a first-time director, stating in a 2014 interview that he learned a significant amount of "how to work with actors" from actress Jones.

=== Music ===
Italian composer Pino Donaggio was in town working on Joe Dante's Piranha (1978) at the time David Schmoeller was filming Tourist Trap. Since Donaggio spoke Spanish – as did Schmoeller – the director was able to convince the composer to score the music for Tourist Trap. The two would have subsequent collaborations, including Crawlspace (1986).

== Release ==
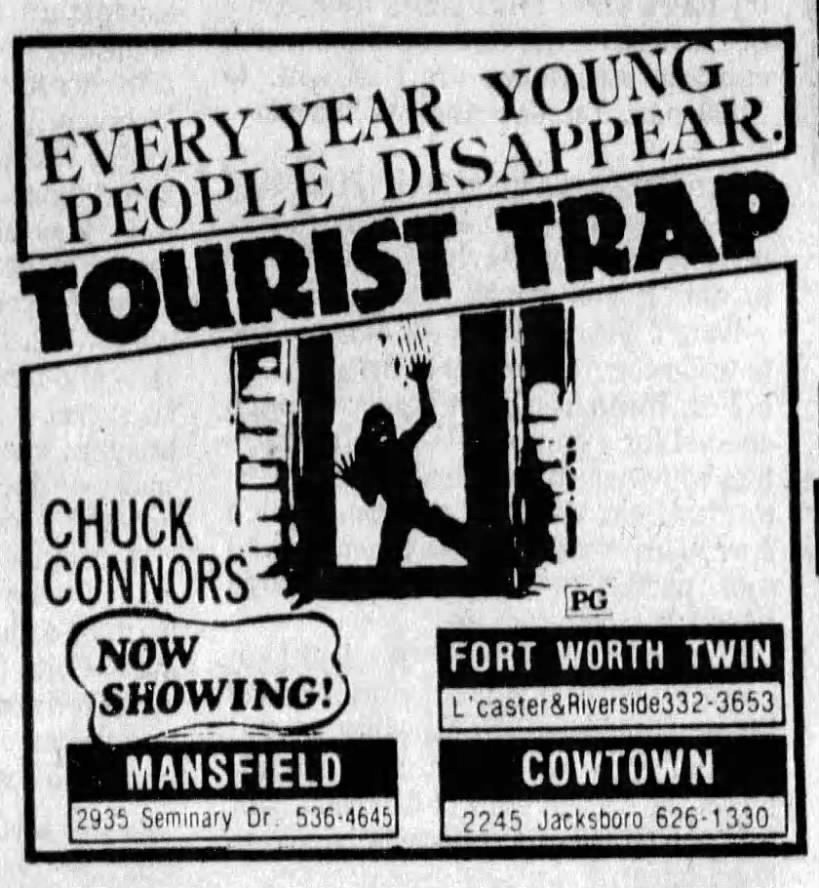
November 1979 advertisement for Tourist Trap in the Fort Worth Star-Telegram

The film premiered in Los Angeles on March 14, 1979, distributed by Compass International Pictures. Despite its depictions of violence and macabre images, the Motion Picture Association of America awarded the film a PG rating. Because of its rating, the film was able to receive significant broadcasting on syndicated television in the years following its theatrical release.

In the United Kingdom, the film's title was amended on January 9, 1981 to Nightmare of Terror for its theatrical release.

=== Home media ===
Media Home Entertainment first issued Tourist Trap on VHS in 1980, with a reprint following in 1984.

The film was later released on VHS and DVD by Cult Video on July 20, 1998. It was re-released on DVD by Wizard Entertainment on March 19, 2013. Full Moon Features released the film for the first time on Blu-ray on May 20, 2014. The Full Moon Blu-ray release features a truncated version of the film that runs at 85 minutes; though the film's violent scenes remain intact, minor plot points are absent from this cut of the film.

The full uncut version of the film on Blu-ray was finally released by Full Moon on November 24, 2020. This version restored the missing 5 minutes and is featured in a collectible retro VHS packaging, with additional supplements including a Mr. Slausen action figure and a DVD copy. A standard single-disc Blu-ray was released on February 9, 2021.

== Reception ==
=== Box office ===
Tourist Trap was a box office hit for Compass International Pictures, grossing $4 million against its $350,000 budget.

=== Critical response ===
==== Contemporary ====
From contemporary reviews, Variety wrote: "Although pic has some appropriately menacing music and occasionally employs some decent special effects, the plot is too loaded with cliches, from the concept to individual bits of dialog to be taken seriously and not silly enough to be regarded as delightfully bad". Charles Champlin of the Los Angeles Times wrote that the film "has some moments of effectiveness, but even the hard-line shiverists are likely to feel it's a long time between shrieks". Ginger Varney of LA Weekly wrote that the film's screenplay "falls short of perfection," but praised the art direction by Robert A. Burns, commenting that it "mounts sufficient thrills to please even the picky hard-core shock fan."

Bill Cosford of the Miami Herald felt the film was derivative and criticized it for its lack of explanation for the motives of the villain. Tim Pulleine of the Monthly Film Bulletin also wrote unfavorably of the film, calling it a "wholly unimaginative exercise in low-budget horror [that] plunders Psycho for its central plot gimmick in a fashion even more hamfisted than it is bare-faced. Nothing much is made of the potentially sinister import of the wax dummies, by comparison with whom the human performers also fail to come off too well".

==== Retrospective ====
On the review aggregator website Rotten Tomatoes, 67% of 9 critics' reviews are positive.

From retrospective reviews, author and film critic Leonard Maltin gave the film one and a half out of four stars, stating that although the film had a couple of genuine scares, it was a "mostly boring thriller". Author Stephen King, in his book Danse Macabre (1981), praised the film as an obscure classic, noting that the film "wields an eerie spooky power, as wax figures begin to move and come to life in a ruined, out-of-the-way tourist resort".

Jason Buchanan from AllMovie also praised the film, calling it "one of the most underappreciated low-budget horror films of the 1970's". In his review on the film, Buchanan commended the film's atmosphere, score, Conners' performance, and unsettling use of sound and imagery, comparing it to Tobe Hooper's The Texas Chain Saw Massacre. TV Guide awarded the film two out of four stars, calling it a "bizarre, eerie shocker".

In a 2020 retrospective, Jim Vorel of Paste magazine called the film "a surreal sort of quasi-slasher, familiar in some ways (the final girl is pretty standard and demure), and decidedly original in others." Jake Dee of JoBlo.com praised the film as an underrated effort, writing in 2021: "Coming full circle, it’s astounding how strong Tourist Trap is 40 years later, and equally confounding as to why it’s still so undervalued... Other than the weak whodunit aspect of the film, Tourist Trap excels 40 years later with its inspired premise, genuinely scary opening sequence, wickedly ambient score, unique death modes, and unpredictable finale." Matthew Jackson, writing for Syfy in 2023, similarly praised the film for its inventiveness and unpredictability, writing: "One of the things that makes Tourist Trap so delightful, particularly when you've already been around the block with better-known slasher films, is the number of twists it puts on certain established formulas, in part because it came around so early that there weren't that many formulas to follow."

== Proposed remake ==
In March 2024, it was announced that Alliance Media Partners had acquired the rights to a remake of the film, produced by Barbara Crampton.

== Sources ==
- Borseti, Francesco (2016). It Came from the 80s!: Interviews with 124 Cult Filmmakers. Jefferson, North Carolina: McFarland & Company. ISBN 978-1-4766-2563-8.
- Gildersleeve, Jessica (2017). Don't Look Now. Liverpool, England: Liverpool University Press. ISBN 978-1-800-34713-7.
- Higham, George (2020). Wax Museum Movies: A Comprehensive Filmography. Jefferson, North Carolina: McFarland & Company. ISBN 978-1-476-64011-2.
- King, Stephen (2011) [1981]. Danse Macabre. New York City, New York: Simon and Schuster. ISBN 978-1-4391-7116-5.
- Maltin, Leonard (2014). Leonard Maltin's 2014 Movie Guide (1st ed.). New York City, New York: Penguin Group. ISBN 978-0-451-41810-4.
- Muir, John Kenneth (2011). Horror Films of the 1970s. McFarland & Company. ISBN 978-0-786-49156-8.
- Normanton, Peter (2012). The Mammoth Book of Slasher Movies. London, England: Robinson. ISBN 978-0-762-44596-7.
