= Michael Heller =

Michael Heller may refer to:

- Michał Heller (born 1936), Polish professor of philosophy, cosmologist and priest
- Michael Heller (poet) (born 1937), American poet, essayist and critic
- Michael Heller (law professor), American professor of property rights and ownership
- Michel Heller (1922–1997), Russian emigre political scientist
- Michael Heller (businessman) (1936–2023), British business executive and philanthropist
- Mike Heller (born 1982), drummer
- Michael Heller, Marketing executive

== See also ==
- Heller (surname), for people with the same surname
