= Hilary Brougher =

Screenwriter and director based in New York City

Hilary Brougher is a screenwriter and director based in New York City. She has directed the films Stephanie Daley (2006), Innocence (2013), and South Mountain (2019).

== Career ==
Born and raised in Upstate New York, Brougher's career began in 1996, when she wrote and directed her first feature film, The Sticky Fingers of Time. The film was an official selection at the Venice, Rotterdam, SXSW, and Toronto International Film Festivals. It was released theatrically in the U.S. in 1997.

In 2006, she released her second feature Stephanie Daley, starring Tilda Swinton, Amber Tamblyn, Melissa Leo, Tim Hutton and Denis O’Hare. The film won several accolades, including the Waldo Salt Screenwriting Award at the Sundance Film Festival. Amber Tamblyn received the Best Actress Award at the Locarno Film Festival for her role in the film as a sixteen-year-old girl accused of killing her newborn child. The film was bought by Lifetime Television and the title was changed to What She Knew.

In 2013, Brougher worked as director and co-writer with Tristine Skyler of an adaptation of Jane Mendelsohn’s novel, Innocence.

Her most recent film South Mountain, starring Talia Balsam, premiered at SXSW in 2019. The film received mostly positive reviews with articles featured in The Hollywood Reporter, Variety and IndieWire.

She is currently working on the documentary Striper about the art and life of Jay Rosenblum, an artist killed in a cycling accident in 1989. The film is co-directed by producer Maria Rosenblum, who is also the daughter of the film's subject.

Brougher is a professor and full-time faculty member in the MFA Film Program at Columbia University School of the Arts. She also chaired the program from 2019-2021.

== Filmography ==
=== Director ===
Year	Title	Writer	Notes
1997	The Sticky Fingers of Time	Yes	Also Editor
2006	Stephanie Daley	Yes	
2013	Innocence	Yes	
2015	Jabberwocky, West Shokan	No	Short - Also Editor
2016	Wake O Wake	Yes	Short
2019	South Mountain	Yes	

== Awards and nominations ==
- Sundance Film Festival 2006
  - Waldo Scott Screenwriting Award (won)
  - Grand Jury Award, 2006 (nominated)
- Deauville Film Festival 2006 – Grand Special Prize (nominated)
- Locarno International Film Festival 2006 – Golden Leopard (nominated)
- Milan International Film Festival 2006 – Best Director (won)
- Jackson Hole International Film Festival 2006 – Best Director (won)
- Mar del Plata Film Festival 2019 – Best Film (nominated)
- Maine International Film Festival 2019 – Midlife Achievement Award (won)
- SXSW Film Festival 2019 – Grand Jury Award (nominated)
