= Burning Down the House (novel) =

2016 novel by Jane Mendelsohn

First edition (The San Remo pictured)

Burning Down the House is the fourth novel by author Jane Mendelsohn. Published in 2016 by Knopf, it tells the story of a rich real estate mogul and the challenges and crises within his complicated family.

== Synopsis ==
Poppy is the orphaned niece, and adopted daughter, of the patriarch of the Zanes, a wealthy New York real estate clan. Neva was born in the Caucasus, and at ten years old, she was sold into the sex trade; years later, she becomes the Zanes' nanny and the patriarch's confidante. Tackling the topics of globalization and human trafficking, Burning Down the House tells the story of one family's struggles with internal rivalries and a shifting empire, driven by two young women—one of whom will help to bring down the household, and one who will use all her strength to try to save the family from themselves.

== Reception ==
Burning Down the House received critical praise for its grand scope and prescience within the contemporary political climate.

Donna Seaman gave Burning Down the House a Booklist starred review, writing, “With gorgeous, feverishly imaginative descriptions of her tormented characters’ psyches, and setting ranging from Manhattan to Istanbul to Laos, Mendelsohn, oracular, dazzling, and shocking, creates a maelstrom of tragic failings and crimes, exposing the global reach of the violent sex-trafficking underworld, and excoriating those among the ‘planetary elite’ who allow it to metastasize.” The Millions said, “The author of the 1990s bestseller I Was Amelia Earhart here focuses on a wealthy New York family beset by internal rivalries and an involvement, perhaps unwitting, in a dark underworld of international crime. Mendelsohn’s novel hopscotches the globe from Manhattan to London, Rome, Laos, and Turkey, trailing intrigue and ill-spent fortunes.”

Kirkus Reviews wrote, "While the dark and twisting plot is heavy on brooding intrigue (international sex trafficking, incest), the book is sharpest when it’s dealing with more quotidian concerns (disappointment, aging)." Paste said, "In tracing the fall of patriarch Steven Zane’s real estate kingdom and the sickening gyres of sex trafficking, Mendelsohn has written a novel in stereoscopic Victorian fashion that puts fear on display—fear of parents for their children, of replacement, of loss, of self, of others. House offers a luxurious look at this fear."

Andrew Solomon, a National Book Critics Circle Award winner for his nonfiction book Far From the Tree, noted the novel’s prescience, writing, “With her devastating eye for the telling detail, her always penetrating insight, and her quiet wit, Jane Mendelsohn has written a book for the ages, an extraordinary investigation of human vanity and vulnerability, of power and disenfranchisement, of luxury and sorrow. Her writing is both taut and lush, her wounded characters both extravagant and authentic, her story grand yet intimate. This is literature of the first order.”
