= Innocence (Mendelsohn novel) =

2000 novel by Jane Mendelsohn

- First edition hardbook cover
- Author: Jane Mendelsohn
- Language: English
- Genre: Fiction
- Published: 2000, Riverhead
- Publication place: United States
- Media type: Print, e-book, audiobook
- Pages: 208 pages
- ISBN: 1573221643

Innocence is a bestselling horror novel by Jane Mendelsohn, first released on August 28, 2000, through Riverhead Books. It tells the coming-of-age story of a teenage girl named Beckett, and addresses themes of innocence, loss, mental illness, sexuality, and femininity.

== Synopsis ==
Beckett is a teenage girl who moves to Manhattan with her father after the tragic death of her mother; at her new school, she is fascinated by three popular girls and the beautiful school nurse. Soon thereafter, the bloody bodies of the three girls are discovered near Beckett's apartment—seemingly the latest in their school's dark history of suicides. The school nurse begins dating Beckett's father, and Beckett is plagued by disturbing dreams featuring the three dead girls. As she grapples with the death of her mother, the tragedies at her school, and the incipience of her menstruation, she finds herself wrapped up in a media-saturated world of mixed messages, in which beauty is everything and the arrival of womanhood is equated to the loss of innocence. Mendelsohn employs the literary device of the unreliable narrator, leaving the reader uncertain of what's real and what's imagined as Beckett travels deeper and deeper into a world in which mysterious women drink the menstrual blood of virgins to maintain their youth and beauty—and Beckett becomes certain that they're coming for her.

== Reception ==
Critical reception for Innocence was mixed. Publishers Weekly's Stephanie Feldman has listed the book as one of her "10 Creepiest Books." The Boston Globe and Library Journal both praised Innocence, with The Boston Sunday Globe writing, "Borrowing classic ingredients from the genres of horror films and popular literature, Mendelsohn has concocted a coming-of-age tale about a Manhattan girl’s adolescence; this is a story of innocence, all right, but that nebulous concept today means finding your way in a media-saturated, sometimes dangerous culture…. Like Jeffrey Eugenides’s The Virgin Suicides and Jay McInerney’s Bright Lights, Big City, Mendelsohn’s story muffles its death and sorrow in terminal irony."

Kirkus Reviews also praised the book: “Invoking a battery of analogues favoring the pop-culture heroines of Alice in Wonderland, The Wizard of Oz, Lolita, and Halloween, Mendelsohn isolates her plucky heroine so fearfully via sparse paragraphs and an underpeopled world that even the most preposterous threats leap out of the move frame to fuel a shriek of pure paranoia. Must reading for anybody who thinks teenagers today have gotten bloated with entitlement: a scarlet will-o’-the-wisp fantasy in which adults and adulthood aren't stupid stiffs but agents of unimaginable evil.” The Village Voice wrote, “Innocence is a kind of Rosemary’s Baby channeled through J.D. Salinger….It’s a graceful, delusionary teenage thriller unusually in touch with young character’s emotional workings, and, at the same time, a book by someone who clearly understands the tricks that make Stephen King’s pages turn.”

The Baltimore Sun called Innocence “A brilliant gothic tale…a harrowing cry of anguish, the siren song of a generation that believes continuing to live beyond one’s teens is a matter of ambiguous choice." Newsday said, “This dark and gothically twisted novel gives us the city as a wicked stepmother’s poisonous fruit, its beauty baneful, its sweetness deadly…. Mendelsohn’s genius lies in her ability to keep both the fantastical and the ordinary in focus at the same time...a brilliant balancing act, a truly thrilling read.”

Innocence grapples with themes of female adolescence, and addresses the fraught nature of menarche in a culture filled with mixed messages about beauty, sexuality, and innocence. Its critical reception reflects the culture and time in which it was released; its messages surrounding menstruation can be considered prescient, reflecting more recent movements of menstrual reclamation and female empowerment. The book continues to receive online attention and praise from readers discovering it years after its publication.

== Film ==
A film adaptation was screened at the Austin Film Festival in 2013 and received a limited theatrical release on 5 September 2014. The movie was written and directed by Hilary Brougher, and starred Sophie Curtis as Beckett and Kelly Reilly as Pamela.

The film diverged significantly from the plot and themes of the novel: most notably, it does not include the book's central focus on menarche and menstruation.
