= South Mountain (film) =

- Directed by: Hilary Brougher
- Written by: Hilary Brougher
- Produced by: Susan A. Stover; Maria Rosenblum; Kristin M. Frost
- Starring: Talia Balsam; Scott Cohen
- Cinematography: Ethan Mass
- Edited by: Maria Rosenblum
- Music by: Herdis Stefansdottir
- Release date: March 11, 2019 (South by Southwest)
- Running time: 85 minutes
- Country: United States
- Language: English

South Mountain is a 2019 American drama film written and directed by Hilary Brougher and starring Talia Balsam and Scott Cohen.

== Cast ==
- Talia Balsam
- Scott Cohen
- Andrus Nichols
- Michael Oberholtzer
- Midori Francis
- Macaulee Cassady
- Violet Rea
- Naian Gonzalez Norvind
- Guthrie Mass
- Isis Masoud

== Release ==
The film premiered at South by Southwest on March 11, 2019.

== Reception ==
On the review aggregator website Rotten Tomatoes, 100% of 25 critics' reviews are positive, with an average rating of 7.8/10. The website's consensus reads: "South Mountain sifts through the wreckage of a broken marriage, finding quietly impactful resolutions through Talia Balsam's nuanced performance." Alex Saveliev of Film Threat gave the film a 9 out of 10. Eric Kohn of IndieWire graded the film a B+.

Nick Schager of Variety gave the film a positive review and wrote that the film "demonstrates a realistically complex conception of stock ideas like 'vengeance,' 'moving on' and 'healing,' and Ethan Mass’s cinematography echoes the material’s dualities in its delicate interplay of light and dark."

Stephen Farber of The Hollywood Reporter also gave the film a positive review and wrote, "Painful, potent scenes from a troubled marriage."
