= Miracles (1986 film) =

1986 comedy film directed by Jim Kouf

- Theatrical release poster
- Directed by: Jim Kouf
- Written by: Jim Kouf
- Produced by: Stephen J. Roth
- Starring: Teri Garr; Paul Rodriguez; Christopher Lloyd; Tom Conti
- Cinematography: John Alcott
- Edited by: Susan E. Morse; Dennis Virkler
- Music by: Peter Bernstein
- Distributed by: Orion Pictures
- Release date: July 11, 1986
- Running time: 87 minutes
- Countries: United States; Mexico
- Language: English

Miracles is a 1986 comedy film about a newly divorced couple who can't seem to get away from one another. The film was written and directed by Jim Kouf. It was an international co-production film between the United States and Mexico.

== Plot ==
Somewhere in the jungle a little girl (Erika Faraon) is sick. Everybody in the tribe is really worried, especially her father K'in (Jorge Reynoso) and her mother (Zaide Silvia Gutiérrez). The witchdoctor cannot heal her and gets drunk. The witchdoctor, called Kayum (Adalberto Martínez "Resortes") throws out a kind of omen/incantation while being completely wasted. It produces a huge thunderstorm with plenty of lightning bolts. It affects the weather in New York, where Roger Briggs (Tom Conti) is performing surgery. The lights go in and out, but he finally finishes it well. The lightning also affects Jean (Teri Garr), who is at a party, enjoying her new-found freedom after her divorce from her hard-working and wealthy husband.

A robbery goes awry. One of the robbers is left stranded and, during his attempt to run away from the police, he causes a multiple car accident. Jean's car ends up at the inner-shop side of a window shop, and Roger's car is barely working. Jean doesn't want to be left to her own devices, so she enters Roger's car. Roger can't stand his ex-wife, and his car is his and only his, especially because it's the only thing which his divorce has granted him. The rest of things went to Jean, his ex-wife.

The robber, Juan, (Paul Rodríguez) gets into Roger's car. He pulls out a gun and kidnaps Jean and Roger, who is driving. He takes them to his home, ties them down and imprisons them within a closet. Jean and Roger succeed on releasing themselves, although they are fighting and verbally abusing each other all the time. They leave the closet, pass through the open door of a room where Juan's relatives are also arguing and try to leave. However, when they enter another room, a hidden police officer fights Roger.

The police were about to break into the criminals' nest. Roger's fight with the police officer cause the police to start shooting like crazy. Juan runs away again, kidnapping Jean and Roger again, and Roger is driving again. The police run after them, shooting wildly. Juan gets frantic because Jean and Roger keep on arguing all the time. There is a moment when Jean tries to jump free but Roger convinces her not to.

A prostitute (Barbara Whinnery) has just rejected a client. One of her heels gets stuck on the pavement. She leaves it there when she hears the police cars suddenly approaching her. The broken heel causes one of the police cars to swerve violently and a shot to go the wrong way. The police car crashes into a bank and is eventually driven to a halt in front of two bank robbers (Alejandro Bracho and Carlos Vendrell) who are caught red-handed trying to blow up the safe of the bank. The shot causes a cash machine to malfunction and release all its money on the head of the tramp (Eduardo Lugo) who was sleeping underneath, who in consequence becomes a rich man.

Harry (Christopher Lloyd) was preparing the plane to take off the following day. As the police arrive shooting, he has to take off with Juan, Jean and Roger getting in the plane in a messy way. Juan gets wounded in an arm and Roger takes care of him. Juan, Jean and Roger seem to become friendly. Jean gets hold of the shotgun, but it's unloaded.

Harry's plane is old-fashioned, rusty, and many instruments don't work well. Juan and Harry jump the plane with their chutes. Harry jumps on top of some Mexican police officers, and Harry says that a man and a woman dressed to the nines kidnapped him. That rings a bell with the Mexican police officers.

Roger tries to fly the plane. He and his ex-wife end up talking about what caused their marriage to fail. At that moment, Roger says that he's "getting the hang of it"—meaning flying the plane—and they both laugh. Both engines die away, and they can't help but laugh about it. They have to go up to avoid a mountain, which causes a rock to fall away. That rock causes a landslide, which will kill a Mexican criminal (Mario Arreola) who had tied a young husband down and was about to rape the young wife.

They take off, and Jean panics when she thinks that Roger is dead. However, he is not, and even pulls her leg off. Jean gets angry and wants to walk through the desert. They find the skeleton of somebody who died in the desert. They walk up to Gomez (Paco Morayta) and his fellow police officer (José Chávez) who are desperate. The Mexican police officers can't understand how the criminals they were looking for had the stamina to survive the landcrash and leave unharmed on their feet. Trapping the two American runaways was going to be their road to success. At that moment, Roger and Jean appear, and try to ask for help.

Gomez and his associate put them in their police car and take them to the police station. Jean and Roger ask the judge (Jorge Russek) to be taken to the embassy, but nobody listens to them. As Jean is a lawyer, she explains the story. They are put into a cell, where they argue some more. Finally, Roger admits that he was worried about Jean, and that was why he got angry when she appeared so late after work nonchalantly, and that was why he broke some bric-a-brac at home - which was the last drop for Jean and pushed her to apply for the divorce.

The judge tells them that the American embassy has already been contacted. They will be freed at the end of the week if the embassy checks their backgrounds. Meanwhile, Juan and Harry were plotting to rob the bank of the Mexican town. However, Juan is already drunk, but the bartender (Víctor Alcocer Gómez) serves him some more. There, he overhears -when Gomez and his mate are celebrating that the Americans are in gaol- that Jean and Roger are at the local prison. Juan tells Harry that there's a change of plans, and they use the dynamite to blow up one of the walls of the prison.

Juan and Harry take Roger and Jean to the derelict boat which is waiting for them to sail away. Captain Irvine (Roger Cudney) betrays them and the police arrive. Juan and Harry are left to shoot the police off, and Jean and Roger end up in the boat floating away. The sea storm makes them wet and pushes the boat towards the sea. Inside the boat, Jean and Roger wake up cold, tired, wet, but they talk some more and this time they kiss.

Roger tries to control the boat, but it's impossible. He gets thrown overboard by the huge waves. Below, Jean gets knocked unconscious, and Roger's doctor bag is kept close to her.

The boat reaches shore. Some sailors pick unconscious Jean up. She is taken care of by a missionary (Ken Hixon), who finds Roger's surgery tools very useful. Jean is well again, but worried about Roger, who couldn't be found.

Roger arrived in the jungle. He is woken up by a coconut hitting him on his belly on the shore of some beach. He initiates a search for Jean, but falls into a hunting trap. The tribe from the beginning of the film takes him to the sick daughter, where the witchdoctor has been tied down until he gets sober again. He is released now that Roger is there. Roger tends to the little girl, but he can't do anything until he's got some surgical instruments. He tries to mimic that the girl needs to be taken to hospital.

The tribe finally understands, and they take the girl to the closest missionary post on a hand-made hammock. The missionary is there because he told a little boy (Roberto Sosa) that Jean's rescue was not a miracle. A rock falling from the helicopter which was taking Jean out of there started a car which crashed into the mission and tore it to pieces. When Roger comes in with the little girl, the missionary man is being tended to as well. He helps Roger perform emergency surgery on the spot. Later on, the returning helicopter will take the little girl to a real hospital.

There, an interpreter (Marie Butler), announces to the family of the girl that she'll be all right. Roger leaves the hospital.

Riding in a taxi, Roger tries to convince the embassy to look for Jean, stating that if he has survived, she may have too. Meanwhile, Jean tries to convince the embassy to look for Roger for the same reason as she is also riding in a taxi. Juan and Harry blow up a bank trying to rob it. The ensuing chaos causes Roger and Jean's cars to collide. Jean and Roger kiss and a few days later they get married again.

== Cast ==
- Tom Conti as Roger
- Teri Garr as Jean
- Paul Rodriguez as Juan
- Christopher Lloyd as Harry
- Adalberto Martínez "Resortes" as Kayum, The Witchdoctor
- Jorge Russek as The Judge
- Jorge Reynoso as K'in
- Zaide Silvia Gutiérrez as K'in's Wife
- Erika Faraon as K'in's Daughter
- Paco Morayta as Sergeant Gomez
- Ken Lerner as Stuart
- Charles Rocket as Michael
- Shelby Leverington as Mother In Hospital
- Barbara Whinnery as The Hooker
- Squire Fridell as Yates
- Ken Hixon as The Missionary
- Brion James as Island Resident
- Roger Cudney as Captain Irvine

== Reception ==
The movie was critically panned.
