= Chuck Connors =

American athlete and actor (1921–1992)

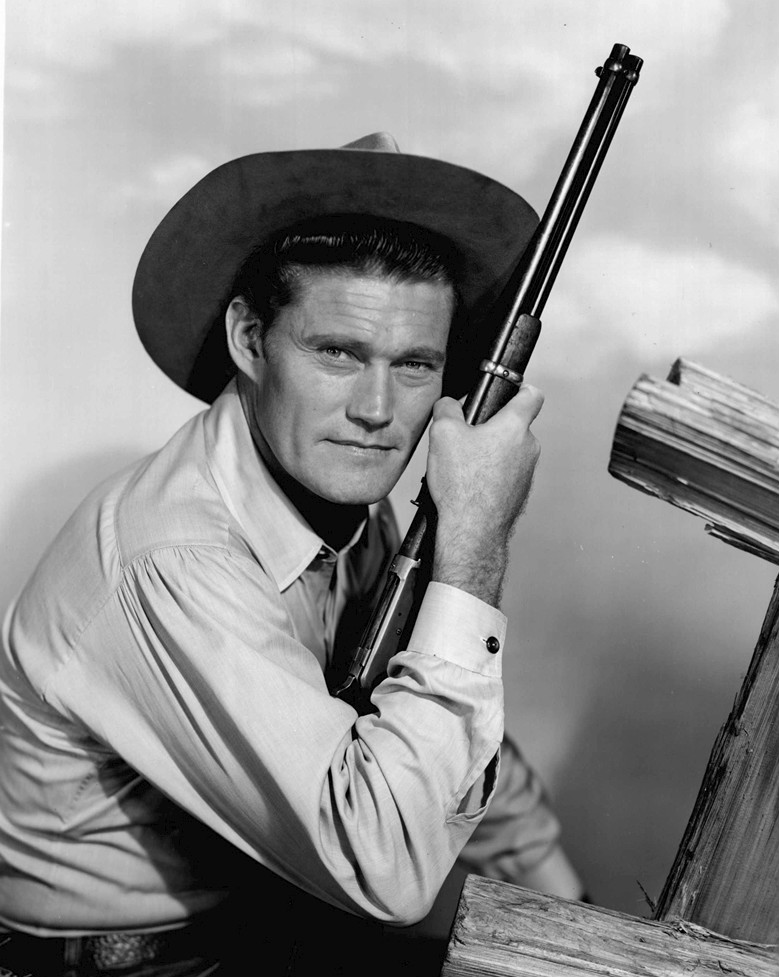
- A publicity still of Connors for The Rifleman in 1963
- Born: Kevin Joseph Connors; April 10, 1921; New York City, U.S.
- Died: November 10, 1992 (aged 71); Los Angeles, California, U.S.
- Occupations: Actor; athlete
- Years active: 1952–1992
- Height: 6 ft 5 in (196 cm)
- Spouses: Elizabeth Riddell (m. 1948; div. 1961); Kamala Devi (m. 1963; div. 1972); Faith Quabius (m. 1977; div. 1980)
- Children: 4
- Baseball career
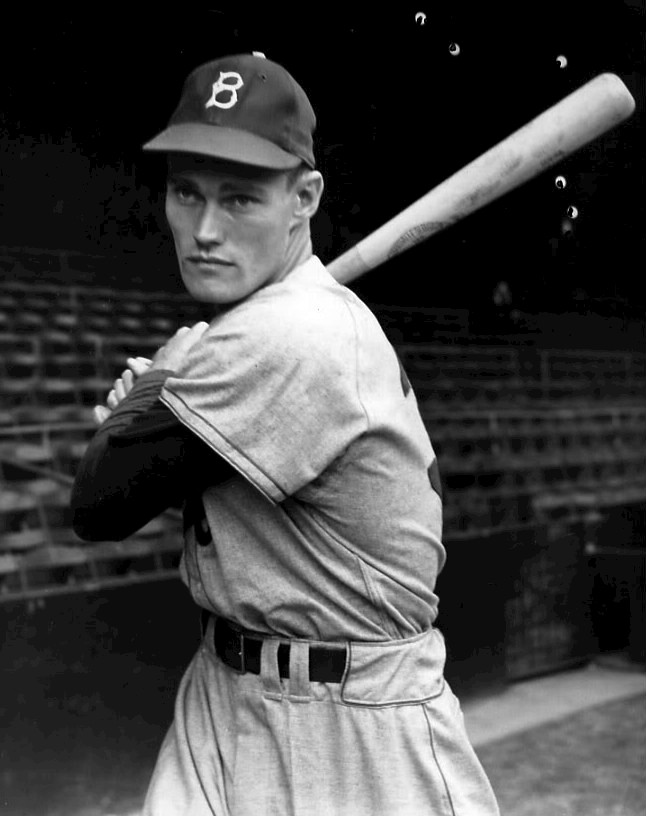
- Chuck Connors as a Brooklyn Dodger
- First baseman
- Batted: Left Threw: Left

MLB debut
- May 1, 1949, for the Brooklyn Dodgers

Last MLB appearance
- September 30, 1951, for the Chicago Cubs

MLB statistics
- Batting average: .238
- Home runs: 2
- Runs batted in: 18
- Stats at Baseball Reference

Teams
- Brooklyn Dodgers (1949); Chicago Cubs (1951)

Kevin Joseph "Chuck" Connors (April 10, 1921 – November 10, 1992) was an American actor and professional basketball and baseball player. He is one of only 13 athletes in the history of American professional sports to have played in both the National Basketball Association (Boston Celtics 1946–1948) and Major League Baseball (Brooklyn Dodgers 1949, Chicago Cubs, 1951). With a 40-year film and television career, he is best known for his role as Lucas McCain on the ABC series The Rifleman (1958–1963).

== Early life and education ==
Connors was born on April 10, 1921, in the borough of Brooklyn in New York City, to Marcella (née Lundrigan; 1894–1971) and Alban Francis "Allan" Connors (1891–1966), immigrants of Irish descent from Newfoundland. He had one sibling, a younger sister named Gloria Marie Connors Cole (1923–2020). Raised as a Catholic in Bay Ridge, Brooklyn, Connors served as an altar boy at the Basilica of Our Lady of Perpetual Help in Brooklyn.

His father became a citizen of the United States in 1914 and was working in Brooklyn in 1930 as a longshoreman, and in 1917 his mother also attained her U.S. citizenship.

Connors was a devoted fan of the Brooklyn Dodgers despite their losing record during the 1930s, and hoped to join the team one day. A talented athlete, he earned a scholarship to the Adelphi Academy, a preparatory school in Brooklyn, where he graduated in 1939. He received offers for athletic scholarships from more than two dozen colleges and universities. He attended Seton Hall University and played both basketball and baseball at the school.

Since childhood, Connors had disliked his first name, Kevin, and sought another name. He tried using "Lefty" and "Stretch" before finally settling on "Chuck". The name derived from his time as a player on Seton Hall's baseball team. He would repeatedly yell to the pitcher from his position on first base, "Chuck it to me, baby! Chuck it to me!" The rest of his teammates and spectators at the university's games soon caught on, and the nickname stuck.

Connors left Seton Hall after two years to accept a contract to play professional baseball. He played on two minor league teams (see below) in 1940 and 1942, then joined the United States Army following America's entrance into World War II. During most of the war, he served as a tank-warfare instructor at Fort Campbell, Kentucky, and later at West Point in New York.

== Sports career ==
=== Minor League Baseball (1940–1952) ===
In 1940, following his departure from college, Connors played four baseball games with the Brooklyn Dodgers' minor league team, the Newport Dodgers (Northeast Arkansas League). Released, he sat out the 1941 season, then signed with the New York Yankees farm team, the Norfolk Tars (Piedmont League), where he played 72 games before enlisting in the Army at Fort Knox, Kentucky, at the end of the season, on October 10, 1942.

Following his time in the Army, Connors played for the Newport News Dodgers (Piedmont League) in 1946, the Mobile Bears (Southern Association) in 1947, the Montreal Royals (International League) from 1948 through 1950, and the Los Angeles Angels (Pacific Coast League) in 1951 and 1952.

=== Professional basketball (1946–1948) ===
Following his military discharge in 1946, the 6 ft 5 in (1.96 m) Connors joined the Rochester Royals (now the Sacramento Kings) of the National Basketball League for their 1945–1946 championship season. For the 1946–1947 season, he joined the newly formed Boston Celtics of the Basketball Association of America. During his tenure with the Celtics in 1946, Connors became the first professional basketball player to break a backboard. He did so during pregame practice before the Celtics' first home game of their inaugural season with a shot and not a slam dunk, which is what typically breaks a backboard in modern basketball. He played 53 games for Boston before leaving the team early in the 1947–48 season.

Connors is among the 13 athletes to have played in both the National Basketball Association and Major League Baseball; the others are: Danny Ainge, Frank Baumholtz, Hank Biasatti, Gene Conley, Dave DeBusschere, Dick Groat, Steve Hamilton, Mark Hendrickson, Cotton Nash, Ron Reed, Dick Ricketts, and Howie Schultz.

Connors attended spring training in 1948 with Major League Baseball's Brooklyn Dodgers, but did not make the squad. He played two seasons for the Dodgers' AAA team, the Montreal Royals, before playing one game with the Dodgers in 1949. After two more seasons with Montreal, Connors joined the Chicago Cubs in 1951, playing in 66 games as a first baseman and occasional pinch hitter. In 1952, he was sent to the minor leagues again to play for the Cubs' top farm team, the Los Angeles Angels.

=== Sports career notes ===
In 1966, Connors played an off-field role by helping to end the celebrated holdout (see reserve clause) by Los Angeles Dodgers pitchers Don Drysdale and Sandy Koufax when he acted as an intermediary during negotiations between management and the players. Connors can be seen in the Associated Press photo with Drysdale, Koufax, and Dodgers general manager Buzzie Bavasi announcing the pitchers' new contracts.

Contrary to erroneous reports, Connors was not drafted by the Chicago Bears of the National Football League.

=== Career statistics ===
Legend
GP	Games played	GS	Games started	MPG	Minutes per game
FG%	Field goal percentage	3P%	3-point field goal percentage	FT%	Free throw percentage
RPG	Rebounds per game	APG	Assists per game	SPG	Steals per game
BPG	Blocks per game	PPG	Points per game	**Bold**	Career high

==== BAA ====
===== Regular season =====
Year	Team	GP	FG%	FT%	APG	PPG
1946–47	Boston	**49**	.247	.464	**.8**	**4.6**
1947–48	Boston	4	**.385**	**.667**	.3	3.0
Career		53	.252	.471	.8	4.5

==== MLB ====
Legend
GP	Games played	AB	At Bats	R	Runs
H	Hits	HR	Home runs	RBI	Runs batted in
BB	Base on balls (walks)	SB	Stolen bases	AVG.	Batting average
OBP.	On-base %	SLG.	Slugging %	OPS	On-base plus slugging

===== Regular season =====
Career offensive totals
Category	G	PA	AB	R	H	2B	3B	HR	RBI	SB	BB	SO	AVG	OBP	SLG	OPS	OPS+	TB	GIDP	SH
Total	67	215	202	16	48	5	1	2	18	4	12	25	.238	.280	.302	.582	55	61	1	1

Career defensive totals
Category	G	GS	CG	Innings	TC	PO	A	E	DP	Fld	RF/9	RF/G
First base	57	49	45	452.1	493	452	33	8	41	.984	9.65	8.51

== Acting career ==
Connors realized that he would not make a career in professional sports, so he decided to pursue an acting career. Playing baseball near Hollywood proved fortunate, as he was spotted by an MGM casting director and subsequently signed for the 1952 Tracy-Hepburn film Pat and Mike, performing the role of a police captain. In 1953, he starred opposite Burt Lancaster as a rebellious Marine private in South Sea Woman and then as an American football coach opposite John Wayne in Trouble Along the Way.

=== Television roles ===
Connors had a rare comedic role in a 1955 episode ("Flight to the North") of Adventures of Superman. He portrayed Sylvester J. Superman, a lanky rustic yokel who shared the same name as the title character of the series.

Connors was cast as Lou Brissie, a former professional baseball player wounded during World War II, in the 1956 episode "The Comeback" of the religion anthology series Crossroads. Don DeFore portrayed the Reverend C. E. "Stoney" Jackson, who offered the spiritual insight to assist Brissie's recovery so that he could return to the game. Grant Withers was cast as Coach Whitey Martin; Crossroads regular Robert Carson also played a coach in this episode. Edd Byrnes, Rhys Williams, and Robert Fuller played former soldiers. X Brands is cast as a baseball player.

In 1957, Connors was cast in the Walt Disney film Old Yeller in the role of Burn Sanderson. That same year, he co-starred in The Hired Gun.

=== Character actor ===
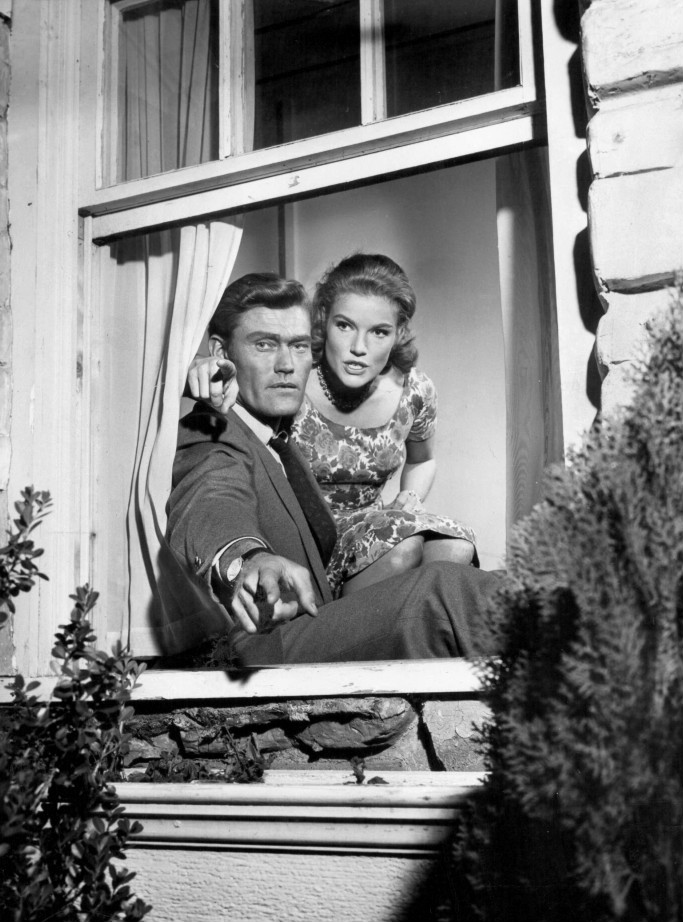
With Pippa Scott in 1960

Connors acted in feature films including The Big Country with Gregory Peck and Charlton Heston, Move Over Darling with Doris Day and James Garner, Soylent Green with Heston and Edward G. Robinson, and Airplane II: The Sequel. He attempted to break into horror with his lead role in Tourist Trap (1979), which he landed after Jack Palance and Gig Young each declined. Director David Schmoeller remembered Connors liking the project and that he worked hard on his double role and his basic acting style as one where "he just did it and expected everyone else to work the same way"; the movie was a modest hit at the time.

He also became a character actor who guest-starred on television. He was on an episode of NBC's Dear Phoebe. He played in two episodes, one as the bandit Sam Bass, on Dale Robertson's NBC Western Tales of Wells Fargo.

His other television appearances were on Hey, Jeannie!; The Loretta Young Show; Schlitz Playhouse; Screen Directors Playhouse; Four Star Playhouse; Matinee Theatre; Cavalcade of America; Gunsmoke; The Gale Storm Show; The West Point Story; The Millionaire; General Electric Theater hosted by Ronald Reagan; Wagon Train; The Restless Gun with John Payne; Murder, She Wrote; Date with the Angels with Betty White; The DuPont Show with June Allyson; The Virginian; Night Gallery hosted by Rod Serling; and Here's Lucy with Lucille Ball.

=== The Rifleman ===
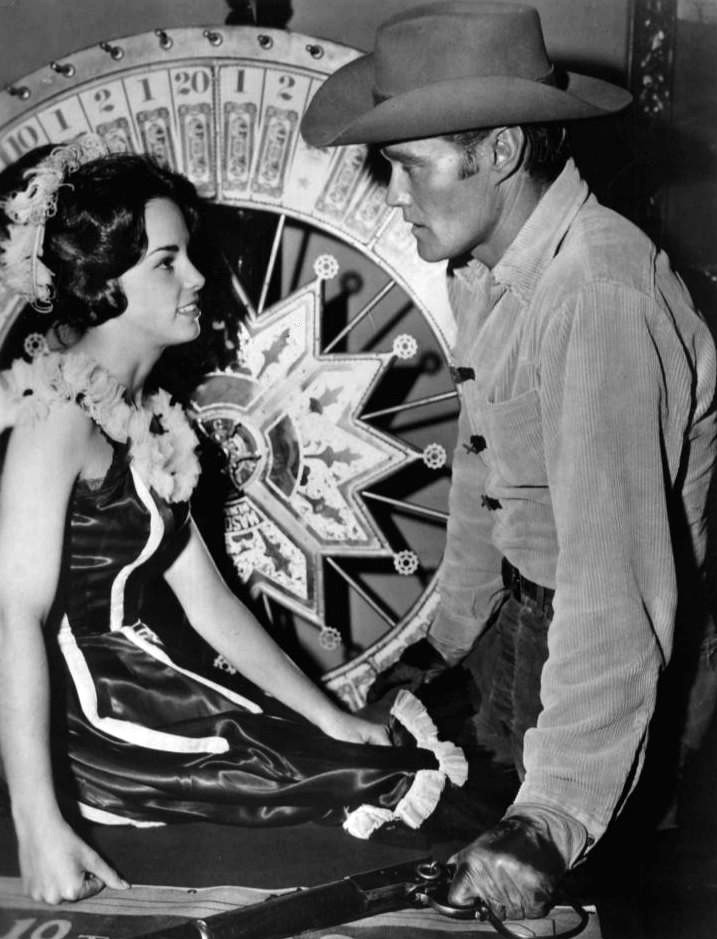
Connors during filming of a 1961 episode of The Rifleman

Connors beat 40 other actors for the lead in The Rifleman, portraying Lucas McCain, a widowed rancher known for his skill with a customized Winchester rifle. This ABC Western series, which aired from 1958 to 1963, was also the first show to feature a widowed father raising a young child. Connors said in a 1959 interview with TV Guide that the producers of Four Star Television (Dick Powell, Charles Boyer, Ida Lupino, and David Niven) must have been looking at 40 to 50 thirty-something men.

At the time, the producers offered a certain amount of money to do 40 episodes for the 1958–59 season. The offer turned out to be less than Connors was making doing freelance acting, so he turned it down. A few days later, the producers of The Rifleman took their own children to watch Old Yeller, in which Connors played a strong father figure. After the producers watched him in the movie, they decided they should cast Connors in the role of Lucas McCain and made him a better offer, including a five-percent ownership of the show.

The Rifleman was an immediate hit, ranking number four in the Nielsen ratings in 1958–59, behind three other Westerns—Gunsmoke, Wagon Train, and Have Gun – Will Travel. Johnny Crawford, an unfamiliar actor at the time, former Mousketeer, baseball fan, and Western buff, beat 40 other young stars for the role of Lucas' son, Mark. Crawford remained on the series from 1958 until its cancellation in 1963. The Rifleman landed high in the Nielsen ratings until the last season in 1962–63, when it was opposite the highly rated return to television of Lucille Ball on The Lucy Show, and ratings began to drop. The show was cancelled in 1963 after five seasons and 168 episodes.

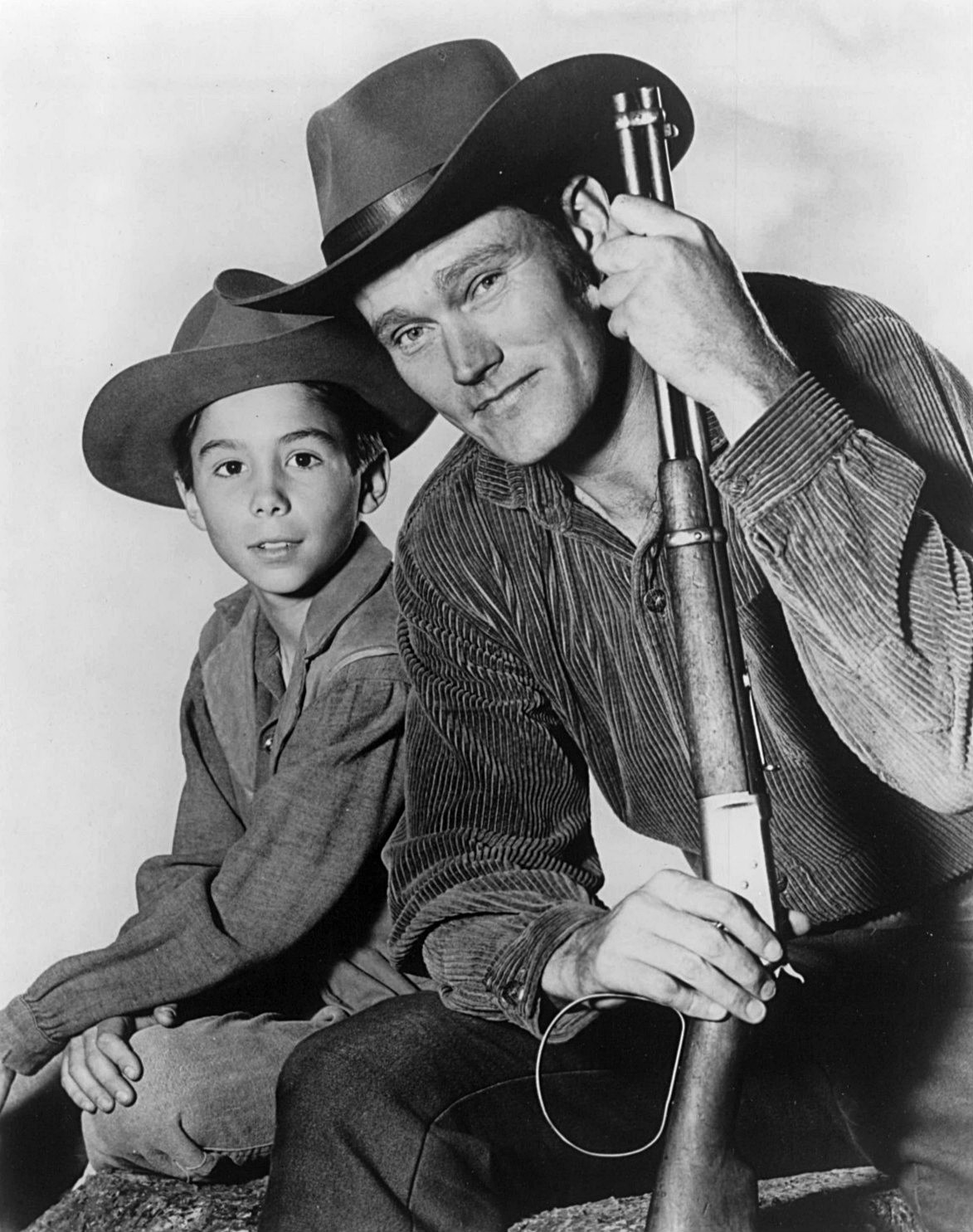
Connors with Johnny Crawford, 1960

==== The rifle ====
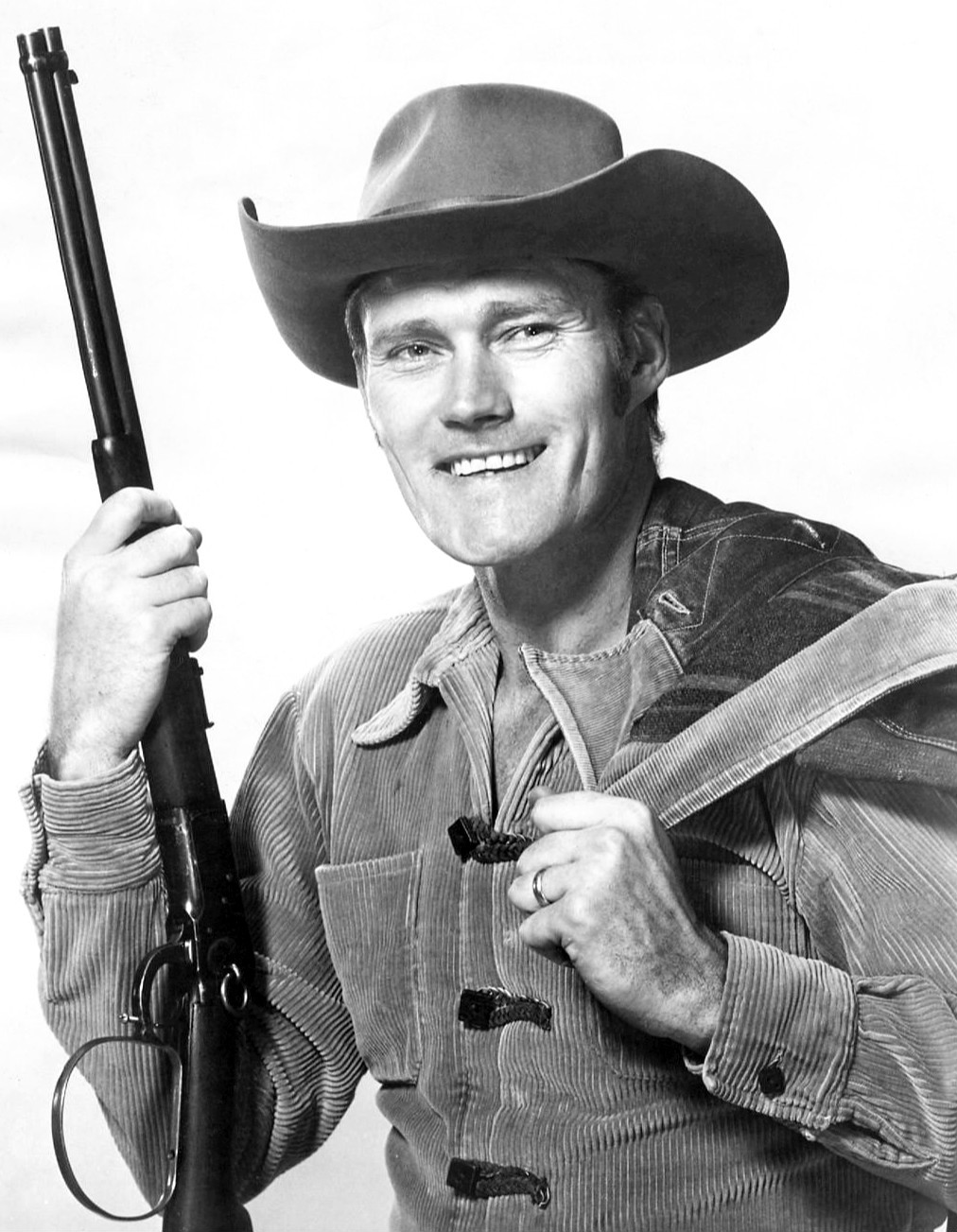
Connors in The Rifleman, 1959

Three rifles were made for the show—two identical .44–40 Winchester model 1892 rifles, one that was used on the show and one for backup, and a Spanish version called an El Tigre used in the saddle holster. The rifle levers were modified from the round type to more D-shaped in later episodes.

Two rifles were specifically made for Chuck Connors by Maurice "Moe" Hunt and were never used on the show. He was a fan of the show and gave them to Connors. Arnold Palmer, a friend and honorary chairman of the annual Chuck Connors charity golf event, was given one of the personal rifles by Connors and it was on display at The World Golf Hall of Fame.

=== Typecasting and other TV roles ===
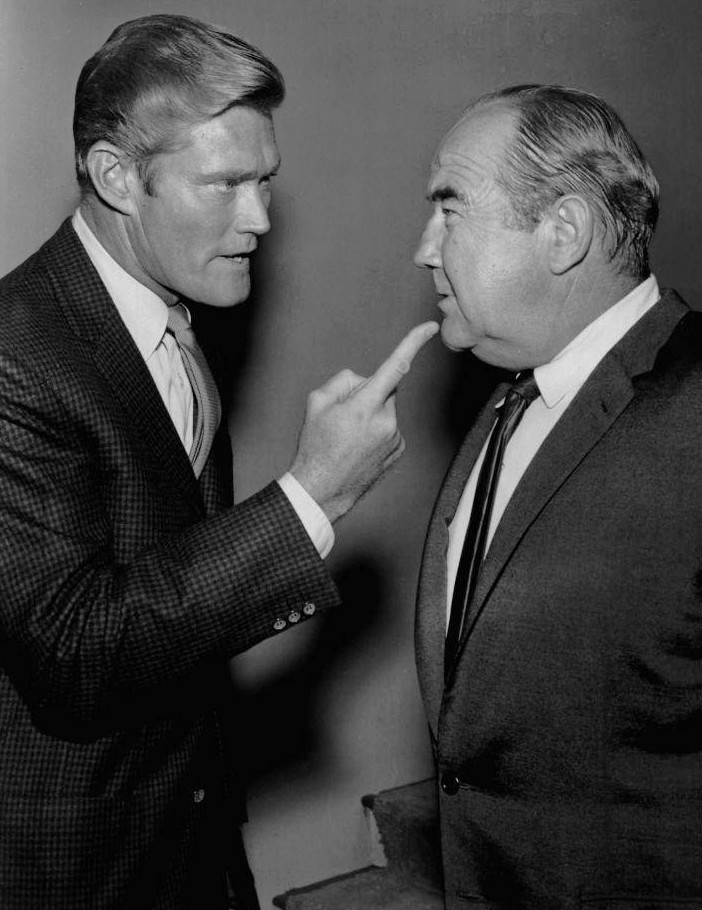
Connors opposite Broderick Crawford in Arrest and Trial, 1963

In 1963, Connors appeared in the film Flipper. He also appeared opposite James Garner and Doris Day in the comedy Move Over, Darling in the role earlier played by Randolph Scott in the original 1940 Irene Dunne/Cary Grant version entitled My Favorite Wife.

As Connors was strongly typecast for playing the single-father rancher, he then starred in several short-lived series, including: ABC's Arrest and Trial (1963–1964), an early forerunner of Law & Order featuring two young actors, Ben Gazzara and Don Galloway; and NBC's post-Civil War-era series Branded (1965–1966).

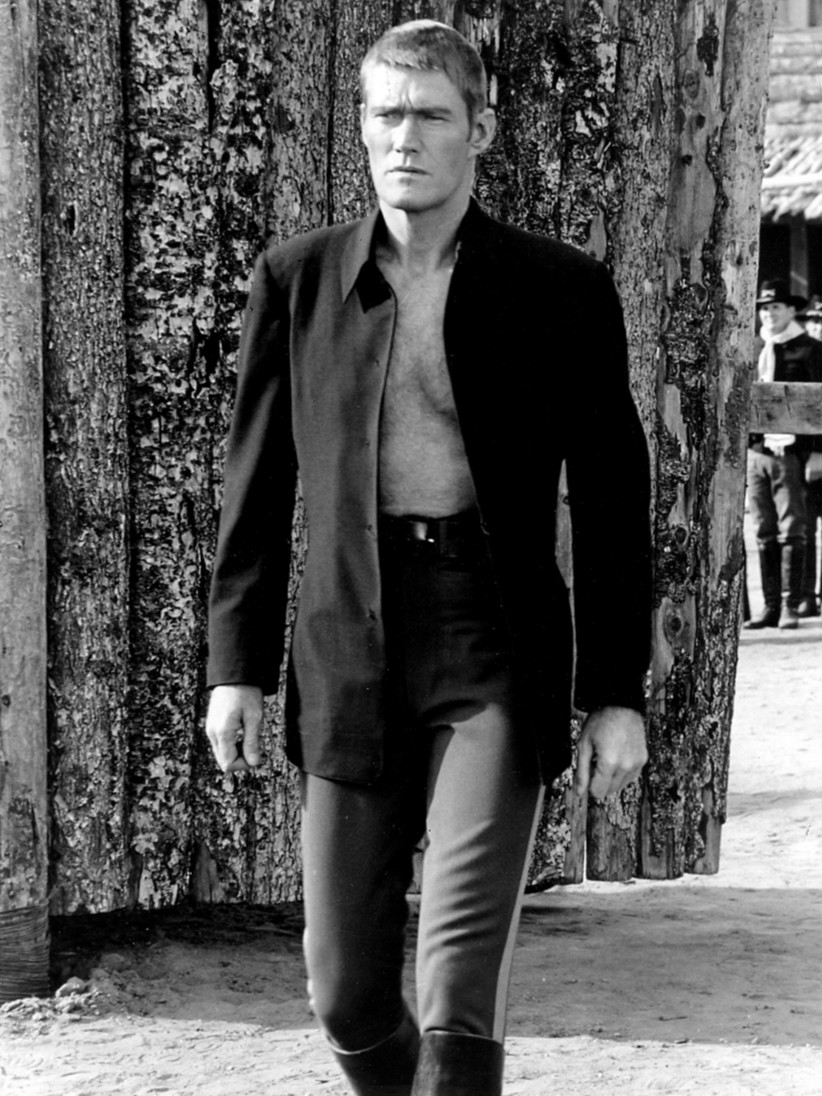
Connors in Branded, 1965

In 1967–1968, Connors starred in the ABC series Cowboy in Africa alongside Tom Nardini and British actor Ronald Howard.

Connors guest-starred in a last-season episode of Night Gallery titled "The Ring with the Red Velvet Ropes". In 1973 and 1974, he hosted a television series called Thrill Seekers.

Connors was nominated for an Emmy Award for his performance in a key role against type: a slave owner in the 1977 miniseries Roots.

Connors hosted a number of episodes of Family Theater on the Mutual Radio Network. This series was aimed at promoting prayer as a path to world peace and stronger families, with the motto, "The family that prays together stays together."

In 1980, he hosted Chuck Connors' Great Western Theatre, a combination of off-network episodes of Branded and The Guns of Will Sonnett, managed by Leo A. Gutman, Inc.

In 1983, Connors joined Sam Elliott, David Soul, Cybill Shepherd, Ken Curtis, and Noah Beery Jr. in the short-lived NBC series The Yellow Rose, about a modern Texas ranching family.

In 1985, he first guest-starred in the pilot episode which would become a recurring role of King Powers in the ABC TV series Spenser: For Hire, starring Robert Urich as Spenser—"with an S, like the poet"—and Avery Brooks as Hawk.

In 1987, he co-starred in the Fox series Werewolf, as drifter Janos Skorzeny.

In 1988, he guest-starred as Gideon in the TV series Paradise, starring Lee Horsley. He also starred as Nash Crawford, an aged, retired Texas Ranger, in the film Once Upon a Texas Train.

In 1991, Connors was inducted into the Western Performers Hall of Fame at the National Cowboy & Western Heritage Museum in Oklahoma City.

== Personal life ==
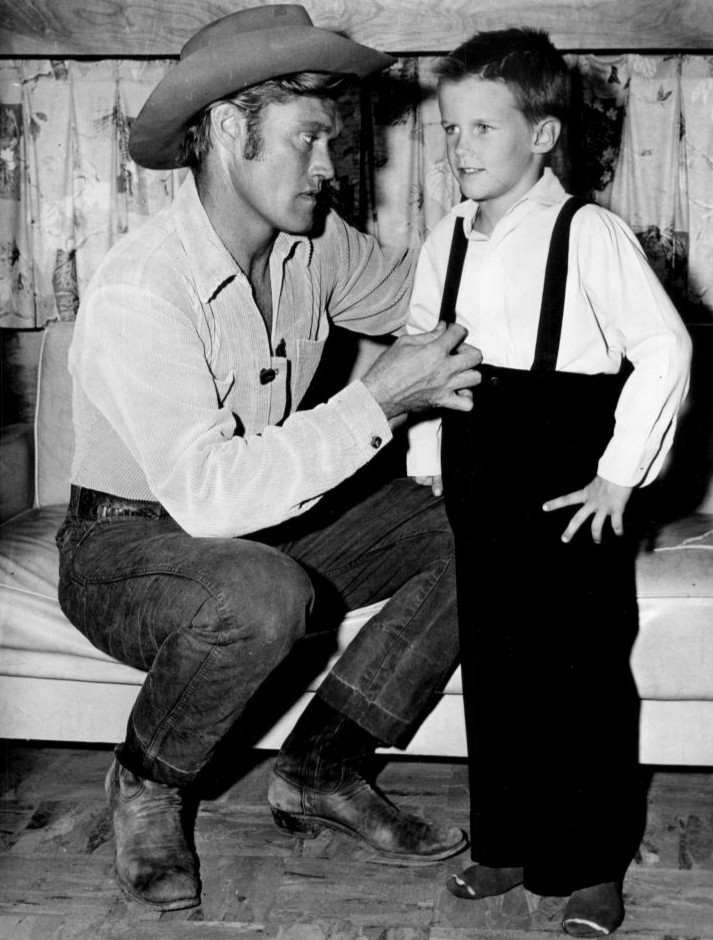
Connors and son, Jeffrey, on The Rifleman set in 1959. Jeffrey had a role as Toby Halperin in the episode "Tension".

Connors was married three times. He met his first wife, Elizabeth Jane Riddell Connors, at one of his baseball games and they were married on October 1, 1948. They had four sons.

Connors married Kamala Devi (1963) the year after co-starring with her in Geronimo. She also acted with Connors in Branded, Broken Sabre, and Cowboy in Africa. They were divorced in 1973.

Connors met his third wife, Faith Quabius, when they both appeared in the film Soylent Green (1973). They were married in 1977 and divorced in 1979.

Connors was a supporter of the Republican Party and attended several fundraisers for campaigns for U.S. President Richard M. Nixon. Connors also backed Barry Goldwater in the 1964 United States presidential election, and Gerald Ford in the 1976 presidential election. He campaigned for Ronald Reagan, a personal friend, and marched in support of the Vietnam War in 1967.

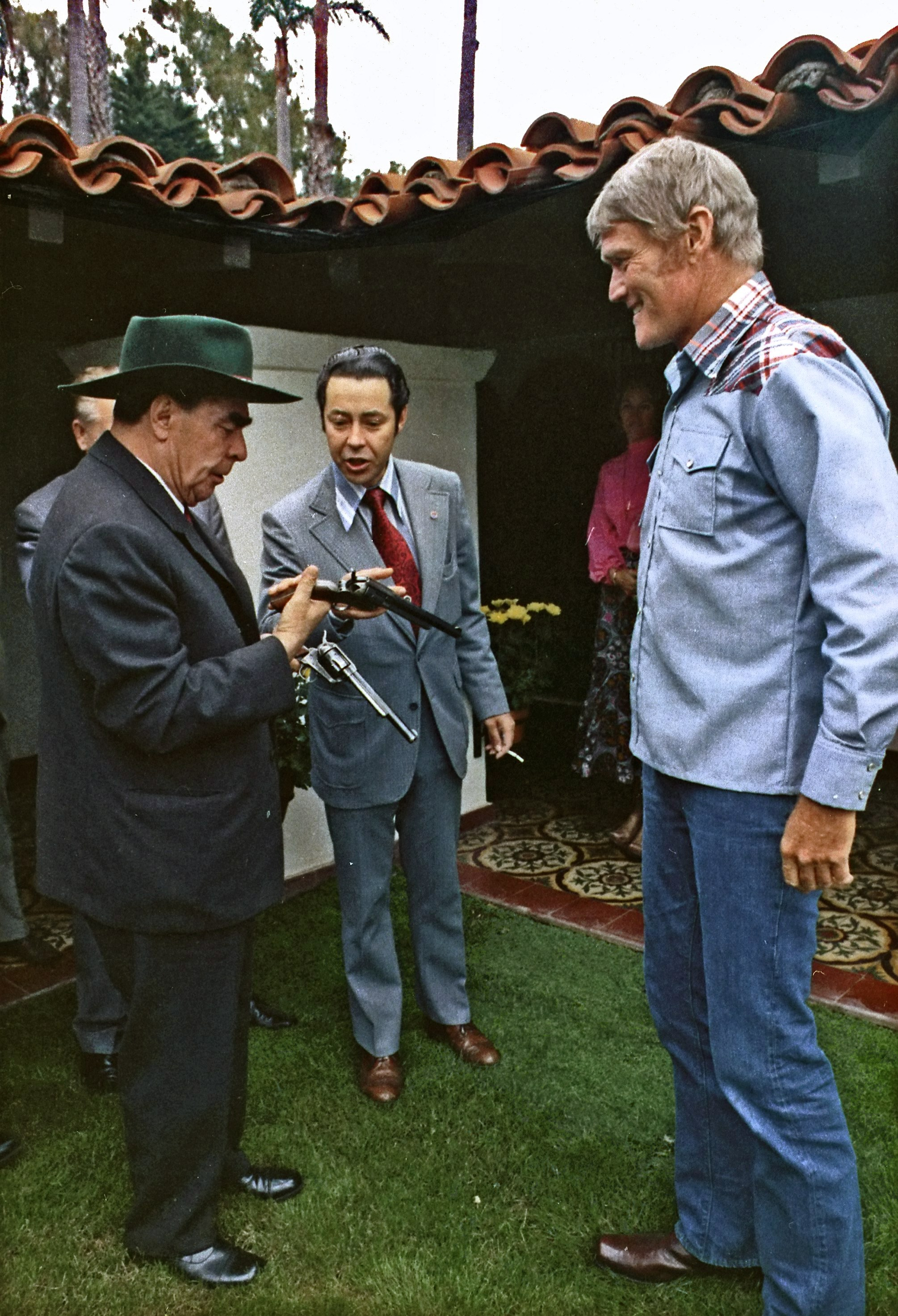
General Secretary of the Soviet Communist Party Leonid Brezhnev (left) and interpreter Viktor Sukhodrev meet Chuck Connors, 1973

Leonid Brezhnev, the leader of the Soviet Union, met Connors when Brezhnev arrived on Air Force One at El Toro Marine Corps Air Station with President Richard Nixon in June 1973. Brezhnev noticed Connors in the group on the tarmac waiting to receive the President and him. Brezhnev shook Connors' hand and then wrapped his arms around him, and leapt into Connors' arms to be lifted up by the hulking American actor. The crowd laughed and clapped at the spectacle. Later, at a party given by Nixon at the Western White House in San Clemente, California, Connors presented Brezhnev with a pair of Colt Single Action Army "Six-Shooters" (revolvers), which Brezhnev liked greatly.

Few American television programs were permitted to be broadcast in the Soviet Union at that time; The Rifleman was an exception, because it happened to be Brezhnev's favorite show. Connors and Brezhnev got along so well that Connors accepted an invitation to visit the Soviet leader in Moscow in December 1973. After Brezhnev's death in 1982, Connors expressed an interest in returning to the Soviet Union for the General Secretary's funeral, but the U.S. government would not allow Connors to be part of the official delegation.

On July 18, 1984, Connors was awarded a star on the Hollywood Walk of Fame (star location at 6838 Hollywood Blvd). Over 200 close friends attended, including his family and actor Johnny Crawford.

=== Charity ===
Connors hosted the annual Chuck Connors Charitable Invitational Golf Tournament, through the Chuck Connors Charitable Foundation, at the Canyon Country Club in Palm Springs, California. Proceeds went directly to the Angel View Crippled Children's Foundation and over $400,000 were raised.

== Death ==
Connors died of lung cancer and pneumonia on November 10, 1992, at Cedars-Sinai Medical Center in Los Angeles. He is buried at San Fernando Mission Cemetery.

== Filmography ==
=== Film ===
Year	Title	Role	Notes
1952	Pat and Mike	Police Captain	
1953	Trouble Along the Way	Stan Schwegler	
1953	Code Two	Deputy Sheriff	Uncredited
1953	South Sea Woman	Pvt. Davey White	
1954	Dragonfly Squadron	Captain Warnowski	
1954	The Human Jungle	Earl Swados	
1954	Naked Alibi	Capt. Owen Kincaide	
1955	Target Zero	Pvt. Moose	
1955	Good Morning, Miss Dove	Bill Holloway	
1955	Three Stripes in the Sun	Idaho Johnson	
1956	Walk the Dark Street	Frank Garrick	
1956	Hot Rod Girl	Det. Ben Merrill	
1956	Hold Back the Night	Sgt. Ekland	
1957	Tomahawk Trail	Sgt. Wade McCoy	
1957	Designing Woman	Johnnie O	
1957	Death in Small Doses	Mink Reynolds	
1957	The Hired Gun	Judd Farrow	
1957	Old Yeller	Burn Sanderson	
1958	The Lady Takes a Flyer	Phil Donahoe	
1958	The Big Country	Buck Hannassey	
1962	Geronimo	Geronimo	
1963	Flipper	Porter Ricks	
1963	Move Over, Darling	Stephen 'Adam' Burkett	
1965	Synanon	Ben	
1966	Ride Beyond Vengeance	Jonas Trapp	
1968	Kill Them All and Come Back Alone	Clyde McKay	
1969	Captain Nemo and the Underwater City	Senator Robert Fraser	
1971	The Deserter	Chaplain Reynolds	
1971	The Birdmen	Colonel Morgan Crawford	
1971	Support Your Local Gunfighter	Swifty Morgan	Uncredited
1972	Embassy	Kesten	
1972	The Proud and Damned	Will Hansen	
1972	Pancho Villa	Col. Wilcox	
1973	The Mad Bomber	William Dorn	
1973	Soylent Green	Tab Fielding	
1974	99 and 44/100% Dead	Marvin "Claw" Zuckerman	
1975	Legend of the Sea Wolf	Wolf Larsen	
1979	Tourist Trap	Mr. Slausen	
1979	Day of the Assassin	Fleming	
1980	Virus	Captain McCloud	
1981	Bordello	Jonathan	
1982	Hit Man	Sam Fisher	
1982	Airplane II: The Sequel	The Sarge	
1982	There Was a Little Girl		
1983	The Vals	Trish's Father	
1983	Balboa	Alabama Dern	
1983	Lone Star	Jake Ferrell	
1983	Afghanistan pourquoi?	Soviet Colonel	
1987	Hell's Heroes	Senator Morris	
1987	Sakura Killers	The Colonel	
1987	Summer Camp Nightmare	Mr. Warren	
1987	Maniac Killer	Professor Roger Osborne	
1988	Once Upon a Texas Train	Nash Crawford	
1988	Terror Squad	Chief Rawlings	
1988	Taxi Killer	Jenny's Father	
1989	Trained to Kill	Ed Cooper	
1989	Skinheads	Mr. Huston	
1990	Last Flight to Hell	Red Farley	
1990	Face the Edge	Buddy	
1991	Salmonberries	Bingo Chuck	
1992	Three Days to a Kill	Capt. Damian Wright	
2001	A Man Who Fell from the Sky	Narrator and host	

=== Television ===
Year	Title	Role	Notes
1953	Your Jeweler's Showcase		Episode: "Three and One Half Musketeers"
1954	Dear Phoebe	Rocky	Episode: "Billy Gets a Job"
1954	Big Town		Episode: "Semper Fi"
1954	Four Star Playhouse	Mervyn / Stan	Two episodes
1954–1957	General Electric Theater	Soldier / Long Jack	Two episodes
1955	Letter to Loretta	Jess Hayes	Episode: "The Girl Who Knew"
1955	City Detective	Sam	Episode: "Trouble in Toyland"
1955	TV Reader's Digest	Charlie Masters	Episode: "The Manufactured Clue"
1955	Private Secretary	Mr. Neanderthal	Episode: "Mr. Neanderthal"
1955	Schlitz Playhouse of Stars	Stanley O'Connor	Episode: "O'Connor and the Blue-Eyed Felon"
1955	Adventures of Superman	Sylvester J. Superman	Episode: "Flight to the North"
1955	Screen Directors Playhouse	Art Shirley	Episode: "The Brush Roper"
1955–1956	The Star and the Story		Three episodes
1955	Matinee Theatre		Episode: "O'Toole from Moscow"
1955	Cavalcade of America	Harry	Episode: "Barbed Wire Christmas"
1956	Fireside Theatre	Officer Handley	Episode: "The Thread"
1956	Frontier	Thorpe Henderson	Episode: "The Assassin"
1956	Gunsmoke	Sam Keeler	Episode: "The Preacher"
1956	Climax!		Episode: "Fear is the Hunter"
1956	The Joseph Cotten Show	Andy	Episode: "The Nevada Nightingale"
1956	Crossroads	Lou Brissie	Episode: "The Comeback"
1956	The West Point Story	Maj. Nielson	Two episodes
1956	The Gale Storm Show	Ooma	Episode: "The Witch Doctor"
1957	The Millionaire	Hub Grimes	Episode: "The Hub Grimes Story"
1957	Tales of Wells Fargo	Sam Bass / Button Smith	Two episodes
1957	The Silent Service	Lt. Jim Liddell	Episode: "The Story of the U.S.S. Flier"
1957	Wagon Train	Private John Sumter	Episode: "The Charles Avery Story"
1957	The Restless Gun	Toby Yeager	Episode: "Silver Threads"
1958	Hey, Jeannie!	Buck Matthews	Episode: "The Bet"
1958	Date with the Angels	Stacey L. Stacey	Episode: "Double Trouble"
1958	Love That Jill	Cliff	Episode: "They Went Thataway"
1958	Dick Powell's Zane Grey Theatre	Lucas McCain	Episode: "The Sharpshooter"
1958	The Adventures of Jim Bowie	Cephas K. Ham	Two episodes
1958–1963	The Rifleman	Lucas McCain	Lead role 168 episodes
1960	The DuPont Show with June Allyson	George Ainsworth	Episode: "Trial by Fear"
1963–1964	Arrest and Trial	John Egan	Lead role 30 episodes
1965–1966	Branded	Jason McCord	Lead role 48 episodes
1967–1968	Cowboy in Africa	Jim Sinclair	Lead role 26 episodes
1971	The Virginian	Gustaveson	Episode: "The Animal"
1971	The Name of the Game	Governor Brill	Episode: "The Broken Puzzle"
1971	The Birdmen	Colonel Morgan Crawford	TV movie
1972	Night of Terror	Brian DiPaulo	TV movie
1972	Night Gallery	Roderick Blanco	Episode: "The Ring with the Red Velvet Ropes"
1973	Set This Town on Fire	Buddy Bates	TV movie
1973	The Horror at 37,000 Feet	Captain Ernie Slade	TV movie
1973	Here's Lucy	Himself	Episode: "Lucy and Chuck Connors Have a Surprise Slumber Party"
1973	The Sonny & Cher Comedy Hour	Himself	Episode: "Chuck Conners, Howard Cosell, Miss U.S.A. and Miss Universe: 9/12/73"
1973–1976	Police Story	Various	Four episodes
1975	The Six Million Dollar Man	Niles Lingstrom	Episode: "The Price of Liberty"
1976	Banjo Hackett: Roamin' Free	Sam Ivory	TV movie
1976	Nightmare in Badham County	Sheriff Slim Danen	TV movie
1977	Roots	Tom Moore	Miniseries
1977	The Night They Took Miss Beautiful	Mike O'Toole	TV movie
1978	Standing Tall	Major Roland Hartline	TV movie
1980	Stone	Tom Lettleman	Episode: "Case Number HM-89428, Homicide"
1981	Walking Tall	Theo Brewster	Episode: "Kidnapped"
1982	Best of the West		Episode: "Frog's First Gunfight"
1982	The Capture of Grizzly Adams	Frank Briggs	TV movie
1982	Fantasy Island	Frank Barton	Episode: "Sitting Duck/Sweet Suzi Swann"
1983	Lone Star	Jake Farrell	TV movie
1983	Kelsey's Son	Boone Kelsey	TV movie
1983	The Love Boat	Roy	Episode: "Bricker's Boy/Lotions of Love/The Hustlers"
1983	Matt Houston	Castanos	Episode: "Get Houston"
1983–1984	The Yellow Rose	Jeb Hollister	Main cast 21 episodes
1985	Spenser: For Hire	King Powers	2 episodes
1985–1989	Murder, She Wrote	Fred Keller / Tyler Morgan	Two episodes
1985	The All-American Cowboy		TV movie
1987	Werewolf	Captain Janos Skorzeny	Recurring role Five episodes
1988	Once Upon a Texas Train	Nash Crawford	TV movie
1988	Wolf		Episode: "Pilot"
1989	High Desert Kill	Stan Brown	TV movie
1989–1990	Paradise	Gideon McKay	Three episodes
1991	The Gambler Returns: The Luck of the Draw	Lucas McCain	TV movie
