= Thrill Seekers =

American television series (1973-1974)

Thrill Seekers is a syndicated American Four Star Television series that was produced in 1973 and 1974. It was hosted by Chuck Connors and featured people who did dangerous stunts.

One episode of the series featured Australian stunt woman Carol Cranston, who was working with the John Anderson Mustang Hell Drivers in the United States. Her episode of Thrill Seekers was shot at Terre Haute showgrounds, Indiana, where Cranston performed a high fall into cardboard boxes, did a hit and run at 30 mph, and was run over by a truck which drove over a plank placed across her midriff. Another member of the Mustang Hell Drivers, Pat Jackson, performed in the series in which she jumped a pick-up truck from ramp to ramp.

Thrill Seekers gained notoriety from a segment where skier Glen Wurtele set himself on fire and skied off a mountain. A short clip of this segment was featured in the 2006 sitcom Malcolm in the Middle.
