= Kamala Devi (actress) =

Indian actress (1933–2010)

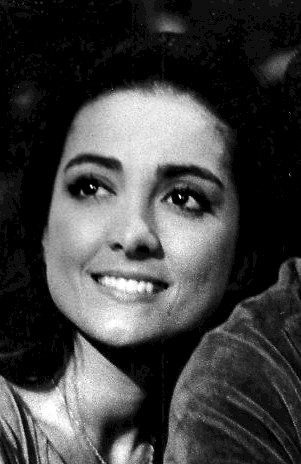
- Kamala Devi in I Spy, 1966
- Born: 8 October 1933; Bombay, Bombay Presidency, British India
- Died: 29 November 2010 (aged 77); Arlington County, Virginia, U.S.
- Occupation: Actress
- Years active: 1958–1968
- Spouses: Chuck Connors (m. 1963; div. 1972) Wallace Guberman (m. 1978; div. 1983) Maurie Beaumont (m. 2005; died 2008)

Kamala Devi Amesur (8 October 1933 – 29 November 2010) was an Indian and American actress, best known for her roles in the 1960s opposite her first husband, Chuck Connors.

== Early life ==
She was born in Bombay (now Mumbai), British India on 11 October 1933. Her mother, Elizabeth, was of English-Welsh descent, and her father, Chandumal Amesur, was a Sindhi Hindu head-and-neck surgeon.

As of 1963, both Devi's parents lived in Bombay, India.

She lived in the US since 1960, and became a US citizen after living in the country for six years. Devi became a US citizen on 2 December 1966.

== Career ==
In 1958, Devi made her film debut in Harry Black, starring Stewart Granger. In 1962, she played in Geronimo the lead role of Teela, the wife of the legendary Apache chief Geronimo, played by Chuck Connors.

In 1964, she portrayed the harem girl and jinn Tezra in The Brass Bottle.

== Personal life ==
Kamala met Chuck Connors on the sets on Geronimo, which they both acted as a couple. Chuck Connors announced the marriage date to press. They married on 10 April 1963, and divorced in 1972.

In 2005, she married Maurie Beaumont, her third husband, who died in 2008.

== Death ==
Kamala Devi died in Arlington County, Virginia, at age 77 on 29 November 2010.

== Filmography and television series ==
Year	Title	Role	Notes
1958	Harry Black	Nurse Somola	
1960	Tales of the Vikings	Dara	
1961	Aas Ka Panchhi		
1962	Geronimo	Teela	with Chuck Connors
1964	The Rogues	Glana Lupescu	
1964	The Brass Bottle	Tezra	
1964	Arrest and Trial	Sandra	
1964	My Three Sons	Siranee	
1965	The Man from U.N.C.L.E.	Deirdre Purbhani	
1965–1966	Branded	Laurette Lansing	3 episodes, with Chuck Connors
1966	I Spy	Felicitas	
1967	Cowboy in Africa	M'Koru	with Chuck Connors
1967	The Rat Patrol	Sallah	
