= Ron Underwood =

American film and television director (born 1953)

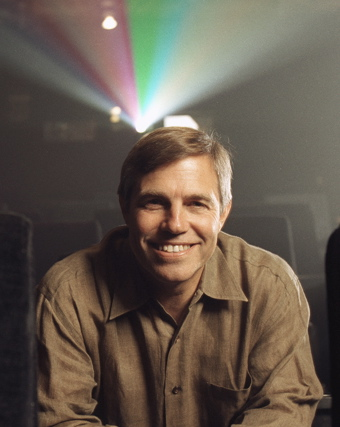
- Underwood in 2006
- Born: Ronald Brian Underwood; November 6, 1953 (age 72); Glendale, California, U.S.
- Education: University of Southern California
- Occupations: Film and television director
- Years active: 1980–present
- Spouse: Sandy Underwood
- Children: Larissa, Lana, Lauren

Ronald Brian Underwood (born November 6, 1953) is an American film and television director, known for directing such films as Tremors (1990), City Slickers (1991), Heart and Souls (1993), and Mighty Joe Young (1998).

== Early life ==
Underwood was born November 6, 1953, in Glendale, California, the son of Ella Julia (née Green) and Laurence Joseph Underwood. In school he lived in Ceylon, now Sri Lanka, as an American Field Service Intercultural Programs exchange student. After graduating from high school, he briefly attended Occidental College as a pre-med student, but transferred to the USC School of Cinema-Television (now USC School of Cinematic Arts) after deciding to become a filmmaker. Underwood majored in cinema with a minor in anthropology. During a summer break while at USC, he directed the first film produced about the sport of hang gliding. "Hang Gliding: The New Freedom" was distributed by Paramount Communications, a short film division of Paramount Pictures.

== Film career ==
=== Early career (1976–1989) ===
Upon completion of his fellowship at the American Film Institute, Underwood began working as a staff director for Barr Films, a company specializing in the production of educational films. Underwood directed over one hundred short films, including an adaptation of the Kurt Vonnegut short story, "Deer in the Works", starring Dennis Dugan. While directing and producing short films for the educational market, Underwood pursued work in the motion picture industry. One of the first movies Underwood worked on was Futureworld (1976) as a production assistant. The film starred Blythe Danner and Peter Fonda, actors he would later direct in 2004. During the filming of Futureworld, one of his tasks was to babysit a young Gwyneth Paltrow while her mother, Ms. Danner, was shooting. Soon after Underwood served as the location manager on the Peter Hyams directed motion picture, Capricorn One (1978). Another early job was acting as assistant director to first-time director David Schmoeller on Tourist Trap, a low-budget horror film. After this he continued to direct and produce educational films and children's television for the next several years. In 1986 Underwood established himself as a director when his live action/stop motion film adaptation of Beverly Cleary's The Mouse and the Motorcycle won a Peabody Award, which was followed two years later by the sequel Runaway Ralph, for which he received a Daytime Emmy nomination.

=== Mainstream breakthrough (1990–present) ===
Following his critically acclaimed venture into children's television, Underwood moved into directing feature films. His first effort was Tremors starring Kevin Bacon, Fred Ward, Michael Gross, and Reba McEntire in her acting debut. Written and produced by his friends Brent Maddock & S. S. Wilson, it was released by Universal Studios in 1990. The film was well received by the critics and later established itself as a cult classic.

Underwood received his first taste of commercial success with 1991's City Slickers, which starred Billy Crystal, Daniel Stern, Bruno Kirby and Jack Palance, who won an Academy Award for his performance. Billy Crystal was nominated for Best Actor in a Comedy or Musical in the Golden Globes for his role. The film made $179m worldwide with a budget of only $27m. It was the tenth most successful film released in 1991 (the fifth most successful in the US).

Underwood joined Brent Maddock, S. S. Wilson and Nancy Roberts to form Stampede Entertainment that produced his next film, also written by Maddock & Wilson, Heart and Souls (1993). It was again well-received by critics but struggled at the box office (making a total of $16m in the US). It starred Robert Downey, Jr., Alfre Woodard, Kyra Sedgwick, Charles Grodin, Tom Sizemore, Elisabeth Shue and David Paymer. He followed this with Speechless (1994), written by Robert King and starring Michael Keaton, Geena Davis and Christopher Reeve. Geena Davis was nominated for Best Actress in a Comedy or Musical in the Golden Globes for her performance.

Given the opportunity to direct a big-budget film by Walt Disney Pictures in 1998, he was asked to direct Mighty Joe Young, a remake of the 1949 RKO film. The film, starring Bill Paxton and Charlize Theron in her first lead role, was nominated for the Academy Award for Visual Effects and featured some of the most sophisticated visual effects seen in film up to that point, paving the way for later ape films like Peter Jackson's King Kong (2005). The special effects drove production costs to around $90m.

Following Mighty Joe Young, Underwood began work on the Eddie Murphy fronted The Adventures of Pluto Nash. The film also starred Rosario Dawson, Joe Pantoliano and Pam Grier. The film was greeted with poor critical reception and became a massive box office failure.

Underwood returned to his roots, directing both low-budget films and television. He directed Stealing Sinatra (2003) for Showtime, about the true story of the kidnapping of Frank Sinatra, Jr. for which William H. Macy received an Emmy nomination. He followed that with Back When We Were Grownups (2004) based on the Anne Tyler novel which garnered star Blythe Danner a nomination for an Emmy as well as a Golden Globe nomination for Best Actress. The film also featured Peter Fonda, Faye Dunaway, and Jack Palance in his last role. This was followed by In the Mix (2005), starring R&B singer Usher and Chazz Palminteri for Lions Gate Entertainment. He has directed many television dramas, including episodes of Monk, Boston Legal, Ugly Betty, Heroes, Grey's Anatomy, Burn Notice, Once Upon a Time, Desperate Housewives, Nashville, Scandal, Agents of S.H.I.E.L.D., The Good Fight, Big Shot, Fear the Walking Dead, Evil, Elsbeth and Cupertino.

== Filmography ==
Short film

- Hang Gliding: The New Freedom (1973)
- Courtesy: A Good Eggsample (1976)
- Deer in the Works (1980)
- A Case of Working Smarter, Not Harder (1982)
- Library Report (1983)
- Overcoming Objections (1984)
- Living With Computers (1984)
- Motivation: The Classic Concepts (1985)
- The Meeting Robbers (1986)

=== Feature film ===
Director

- Tremors (1990) (Also story writer)
- City Slickers (1991)
- Heart and Souls (1993)
- Speechless (1994)
- Mighty Joe Young (1998)
- The Adventures of Pluto Nash (2002)
- In the Mix (2005)

Other credits

Year	Title	Notes
1976	Futureworld	Production assistant
1978	Capricorn One	Location manager
1979	Tourist Trap	First assistant director
1986	Crawlspace	Associate producer
1996	Tremors 2: Aftershocks	Executive producer

=== Television ===
Year	Title	Episode(s)
1986	ABC Weekend Special	"The Mouse and the Motorcycle"
1986	ABC Weekend Special	"Runaway Ralph"
2003	Monk	"Mr. Monk Goes to the Theater"
2003	Monk	"Mr. Monk Goes to Mexico"
2004	Boston Legal	"Change of Course"
2004	Boston Legal	"The Ass Fat Jungle"
2007	Reaper	"Magic"
2007	Reaper	"My Brothers's Reaper"
2007	Reaper	"Dirty Sexy Mongol"
2008	The Secret Life of the American Teenager	"Falling in Love"
2008	The Secret Life of the American Teenager	"What Have You Done to Me?"
2008	The Secret Life of the American Teenager	"I Feel Sick"
2008	Ugly Betty	"Ugly Berry"
2008	Ugly Betty	"Zero Worship"
2008	Eli Stone	"Owner of a Lonely Heart"
2008	Eli Stone	"One More Try"
2009	Make It or Break It	"Where's Kaylie?"
2009	Drop Dead Diva	"The 'F' Word"
2009	Drop Dead Diva	"Dead Model Walking"
2010	Heroes	"Chapter Twelve: 'Upon This Rock'"
2010	Happy Town	"Questions and Antlers"
2010	No Ordinary Family	"No Ordinary Vigilante"
2010	Hellcats	"Worried Baby Blues"
2010	Hellcats	"Finish What We Started"
2010	Chaos	"Song of the North"
2010	Chaos	"Love and Rockets"
2010	Chaos	"Mincemeat"
2011	Necessary Roughness	"Anchor Management"
2011	Harry's Law	"American Girl"
2011	Harry's Law	"The Whole Truth"
2011–2013	Castle	"Food to Die For"
2011–2013	Castle	"Scared to Death"
2012	Burn Notice	"Means and Ends"
2012	Desperate Housewives	"What's the Good of Being Good"
2012–2018	Once Upon a Time	"Red-Handed"
2012–2018	Once Upon a Time	"Into the Deep"
2012–2018	Once Upon a Time	"Lost Girl"
2012–2018	Once Upon a Time	"The New Neverland"
2012–2018	Once Upon a Time	"Snow Drifts"
2012–2018	Once Upon a Time	"White Out"
2012–2018	Once Upon a Time	"Best Laid Plans"
2012–2018	Once Upon a Time	"Mother"
2012–2018	Once Upon a Time	"The Dark Swan"
2012–2018	Once Upon a Time	"Firebird"
2012–2018	Once Upon a Time	"A Bitter Draught"
2012–2018	Once Upon a Time	"Wish You Were Here"
2012–2018	Once Upon a Time	"Ill-Boding Patterns"
2012–2018	Once Upon a Time	"The Song in Your Heart"
2012–2018	Once Upon a Time	"The Garden of Forking Paths"
2012–2018	Once Upon a Time	"Breadcrumbs"
2012–2018	Once Upon a Time	"Is This Henry Mills?"
2012–2013	Scandal	"Hunting Season"
2012–2013	Scandal	"Snake in the Garden"
2012–2015	Grey's Anatomy	"Suddenly"
2012–2015	Grey's Anatomy	"The Girl With No Name"
2012–2015	Grey's Anatomy	"Things We Said Today"
2012–2015	Grey's Anatomy	"You Got To Hide Your Love Away"
2012–2015	Grey's Anatomy	"All I Could Do Is Cry"
2013	The Glades	"Gypsies, Tramps and Thieves"
2013	The Glades	"Fast Ball"
2014–2015	Nashville	"We've Got Things To Do"
2014–2015	Nashville	"Unguarded Moments"
2014	Resurrection	"Us Against the World"
2014	Resurrection	"Multiple"
2014–2016	Agents of S.H.I.E.L.D.	"A Fractured House"
2014–2016	Agents of S.H.I.E.L.D.	"Devils You Know"
2014–2016	Agents of S.H.I.E.L.D.	"Bouncing Back"
2016	Quantico	"Drive"
2016	Dead of Summer	"Barney Rubble Eyes"
2016	BrainDead	"Taking on Water: How Leaks in D.C. Are Discovered and Patched"
2016	No Tomorrow	"No Regrets"
2016–2019	Hawaii Five-0	"Ka hale ho 'okauweli"
2016–2019	Hawaii Five-0	"He kaha lu'u ke ala, mai kolo aku"
2016–2019	Hawaii Five-0	"A'ohe kio pohaku nalo i ke alo pali"
2016–2019	Hawaii Five-0	"Ka la 'au kumu 'ole o Kahilikolo"
2017–2018	The Good Fight	"Stoppable: Requiem for an Airdate"
2017–2018	The Good Fight	"Day 429"
2017–2018	The Good Fight	"Day 485"
2017	Kevin (Probably) Saves the World	"Dave"
2018–2019	MacGyver	"Mac + Jack"
2018–2019	MacGyver	"Fence + Suitcase + Americium-241"
2018–2019	Magnum P.I.	"The Ties That Bind"
2018–2019	Magnum P.I.	"Lie, Cheat, Steal, Kill"
2019–2023	Fear the Walking Dead	"210 Words Per Minute"
2019–2023	Fear the Walking Dead	"The Key"
2019–2023	Fear the Walking Dead	"Cindy Hawkins"
2019–2023	Fear the Walking Dead	"Sonny Boy"
2019–2023	Fear the Walking Dead	"Odessa"
2019	Grand Hotel	"Smokeshow"
2019	Evil	"177 Minutes"
2021–2022	Big Shot	"TCKS"
2021–2022	Big Shot	"Carlsbad Crazies"
2021–2022	Big Shot	"Everything to Me"
2021–2022	Big Shot	"BOYS!"
2021	Evil	"C Is for Cop"
2022	Tales of the Walking Dead	"Evie / Joe"
2022–2024	La Brea	"The Fog"
2022–2024	La Brea	"Sierra"
2022–2024	La Brea	"Don't Look Up"
2024–2025	Elsbeth	"Reality Shock"
2024–2025	Elsbeth	"Elsbeth Flips The Bird"
2024–2025	Elsbeth	"Good Grief"
2024–2025	Elsbeth	"A Hard Nut to Crack"
2025	Watson	"Patient Question Mark"
2026	Cupertino	"Vik & Bo"
2026	Elsbeth	"A Big Lie"

TV movies

- Stealing Sinatra (2003)
- Back When We Were Grownups (2004)
- Santa Baby (2006)
- The Year Without A Santa Claus (2006)
- Holiday in Handcuffs (2007)
- Santa Baby 2: Christmas Maybe (2009)
- Deck the Halls (novel) (2011)

== Awards and nominations ==
Year	Association	Category	Work	Result	Notes
1989	Daytime Emmy Award	Special Class Directing	ABC Weekend Special	Nominated	Episode Runaway Ralph; Shared with John Clark Matthews
1994	Saturn Award	Best Director	Heart and Souls	Nominated	
2002	Stinkers Bad Movie Award	Worst Sense of Direction	The Adventures of Pluto Nash	Nominated	
2003	Razzie Award	Worst Director	The Adventures of Pluto Nash	Nominated	
2007	DGA Award	Outstanding Directorial Achievement in Children's Programs	The Year Without a Santa Claus	Nominated	
