= The Arrival (1991 film) =

1991 American science fiction horror film

- Directed by: David Schmoeller
- Produced by: Gary Schmoeller; Ron Matonak
- Starring: John Saxon; Joseph Culp
- Cinematography: Steve Grass
- Edited by: Randy Bricker
- Music by: Richard Band
- Production company: Del Mar Entertainment
- Distributed by: Rapid Film Group (US); Filmtrust Motion Picture Licensing (Non-US)
- Release date: September 9, 1991 (Toronto International Film Festival)
- Running time: 107 minutes
- Country: United States

The Arrival is a 1991 American science fiction horror film directed by David Schmoeller.

== Plot ==
After crash-landing, an alien infiltrates the failing body of Max Page, an elderly man on the brink of death. Despite dying during his 73rd birthday celebration, he inexplicably revives on the autopsy table, his health rejuvenated and aging reversed.

He develops a disturbing craving for the estrogen-infused blood of ovulating women, leading him to commit grisly murders. Despite longing for a normal relationship with his nurse, his murderous compulsion, requiring a victim every 48 hours, proves insurmountable.

Thirteen weeks later, FBI Agent John Mills enters the scene to hunt down the mysterious serial killer. When he shows Max's son a photo of the suspect, the son is shocked to recognize his rejuvenated father. Together, they conclude that an alien presence has taken control of Max's body, driving him to commit the brutal murders.

== Production ==
The film was shot in San Diego.

== Release ==
The Arrival was shown at the 1991 Toronto International Film Festival as part of their Midnight Madness screenings.

== Reception ==
From a contemporary review, Psychotronic Video magazine referred to the film as a "dull movie".

Cavett Binion (AllMovie) gave the film a two star out of five rating, noting that "very little is done with the premise of the alien's estrogen requirements, other than to show Max sniffing around in some rather inappropriate places." In his book Horror and Science Fiction Film IV, Donald C Willis described the film as "mawkish and routine except for the gradual-rejuvenation idea."

Creature Feature gave the film 3.5 out of 5 stars, stating that while the exposition on the alien is lacking, that the movie packs an emotional punch.

Moira gave the movie 2 out of four stars, praising the ideas of the movie but finding the execution somewhat lacking.

TV Guide found the movie to be lackluster, although it did find the cameos of Carolyn Purdy-Gordon as a drunk and Stuart Gordon to be of note to genre fans.
