= Barbara Whinnery =

American actress

- Education: University of California
- Occupation: Actress
- Years active: 1981–present

Barbara Whinnery is an American actress from Berkeley, California, best known for the role of Dr. Cathy Martin on the television drama St. Elsewhere. She has made guest appearances in several other television shows and has also appeared in movies and on stage.

Whinnery enrolled in the University of California planning to major in biology, but taking a class in drama changed her mind. She graduated with a degree in theater arts, after which she joined the theater's apprentice program at The Barn Theatre in Augusta, Michigan in 1975. She also trained at the Actor's Conservatory Theater in San Francisco.

== Filmography ==
=== Film ===
Year	Title	Role	Notes
1986	Hamburger: The Motion Picture	Sister Sara	
1986	Miracles	The Hooker	
1986	Crawlspace	Harriet Watkins	
1988	Hot to Trot	Denise	
2006	Street of Death	Homeless Woman	Short
2020	The Killing of Two Lovers	Mrs. Staples	
2020	The Wolf of Snow Hollow	Mrs. Fairchild	

=== Television ===
Year	Title	Role	Notes
1981	Best of the West	Joleen Hickerson	Episode: "Daniel's First Love"
1982–1986	St. Elsewhere	Dr. Cathy Martin	32 episodes
1984	Riptide	Janice Simpkins	Episode: "Be True to Your School"
1985	Murder, She Wrote	Gretchen Pashko	Episode: "Broadway Malady"
1987	Houston Knights	Amy Fields	Episode: "Heads I Win, Tails You Lose"
1988	Jake and the Fatman	Lucille	Episode: "Blues in the Night"
1988–1990	Matlock	Anna Moore, Arlene, Doreen Ferguson	Episodes: "The Lovelorn", "The Black Widow", "The Brothers"
1990	People Like Us	Dodo Fitz Allen	TV miniseries
1991	Seeds of Tragedy	Alex	TV film
1993	CBS Schoolbreak Special	Bobbie Walters	Episode: "Big Boys Don't Cry"
1994	Valley of the Dolls	Wanda	Episode: "1.10"
1995	Vanishing Son	Ella	Episode: "Miracle Under 34th Street"
1996	Chicago Hope	Mrs. Sylvia	Episode: "Transplanted Affection"
1996	Days of Our Lives	Nancy	2 episodes
1996	Apollo 11	Lola Morrow	TV film
1997	Buffy the Vampire Slayer	Mrs. Anderson	Episode: "The Pack"
1997	Beyond Belief: Fact or Fiction	Maggie	Segment: "Imaginary Friend"
1998	Diagnosis: Murder	Lorraine Bare	Episode: "Baby Boom"
1998	ER	Mrs. Draper	Episode: "Day for Knight"
1998–1999	Sunset Beach	Sister Bertrille	Recurring role
1999	Brimstone	Katherine	Episode: "Faces"
2008	True Blood	Child Psychologist	Episode: "The First Taste"
