= Galactic Gigolo =

1987 film

- Directed by: Gorman Bechard
- Written by: Gorman Bechard
- Produced by: Gorman Bechard; Kristine Bechard
- Starring: Carmine Capobianco; Debi Thibeault; Frank Stewart; Ruth Collins; Donna Davidge
- Cinematography: Gorman Bechard
- Edited by: Joe Keiser
- Music by: Michael Bernard; Bob Esty
- Distributed by: Beyond Infinity
- Release date: 1987
- Running time: 80 min
- Country: United States
- Language: English

Galactic Gigolo (also known as Club Earth) is a 1987 American science fiction comedy film directed by Gorman Bechard.

== Plot ==
Eoj (Carmine Capobianco), a sentient vegetable alien who wins a grand prize from a game show on his home planet of Crowak. The prize is a two-week expenses paid trip to Earth. Eoj somewhat resembles a broccoli, but he has shape shifting abilities.

Once he arrives on Earth, the alien disguises himself as a man and develops a taste for sex with Earth women. Hildy (Debi Thibeault) is a reporter who is writing a chronicle of Eoj's adventures.

After a televised press conference featuring Eoj, the mob decides to capture the alien and force it to aid in the commission of crimes, while a group of Jewish rednecks decide Eoj is communist and must be killed.

== Cast ==
Carmine Capobianco .......... Eoj

Debi Thibeault .............. Hildy

Frank Stewart ............... Waldo

Ruth Collins ............ Dr. Ruth Pepper

== Reception ==
TV Guide found little worthwhile in the movie, stating that it "awful mix of puns, bargain-basement production values, and muddled plot lines, GALACTIC GIGOLO is truly wretched. Tasteless, stupid jokes abound, and the editing philosophy left much to be desired. Creature Feature gave the movie 1.5 out of 5 stars, also finding little redeeming in the movie."
