= The Sticky Fingers of Time =

- Directed by: Hilary Brougher
- Written by: Hilary Brougher
- Produced by: Jean Castelli; Isen Robbins; Susan A. Stover
- Starring: Terumi Matthews; Nicole Zaray
- Cinematography: Ethan Mass
- Edited by: Sabine Hoffman
- Music by: Miki Navazio
- Distributed by: Strand Releasing
- Release date: September 9, 1997 (Canada)
- Running time: 81 minutes
- Language: English

The Sticky Fingers of Time is a 1997 American science fiction film directed by Hilary Brougher and starring Terumi Matthews, Nicole Zaray, Belinda Becker, James Urbaniak and Samantha Buck. It premiered on September 9, 1997 at the 22nd Toronto International Film Festival in the Discovery programme section.
