= I Was Amelia Earhart =

1996 novel by Jane Mendelsohn

- Author: Jane Mendelsohn
- Language: English
- Subject: Amelia Earhart
- Genre: Fiction
- Publisher: Alfred A. Knopf
- Publication date: April 16, 1996
- Publication place: United States
- Pages: 145
- ISBN: 9780224044349
- OCLC: 36551628

I Was Amelia Earhart is Jane Mendelsohn's debut novel, published by Knopf in 1996. It tells a fictional account of what happened to Amelia Earhart and her navigator, Fred Noonan, after they disappeared off the coast of New Guinea in 1937. The book was shortlisted for the 1997 Orange Prize for Fiction and appeared on the New York Times Best Seller list for fourteen weeks.

== Synopsis ==
Narrated alternately in the third person and in the voice of Earhart herself, I Was Amelia Earhart tells the fictional story of the time following the famous aviator's mysterious disappearance in 1937. Earhart and her raffish navigator, Fred Noonan, crash-land on a desert island. They fight, skirt the edges of insanity, adapt to their environment, and fall in and out of love. Flashbacks tell the story of Earhart's life: her childhood desire to become a heroine, her love affair with flying, and her difficult marriage to the man who pushed her further in her career and closer to danger. Meanwhile, Earhart experiences a personal transformation and rebirth, breaking through the limitations of her celebrity persona.

== Reception ==
I Was Amelia Earhart was critically acclaimed for its poetic, lyrical, and mythic qualities. Michiko Kakutani wrote in The New York Times, “In this lyrical first novel...Ms. Mendelsohn has chosen to use the bare-boned outlines of the aviator’s life as an armature for a poetic meditation on freedom and love and flight…. The resulting novel...invokes the spirit of a mythic personage, while standing on its own as a powerfully imagined work of fiction. Ms. Mendelsohn invests her story with force of fable."

Daphne Merkin wrote in The New Yorker, "[The book] appears like a flash of silver in the leaden skies of contemporary fiction. It is a haunting and delicate piece of guesswork…. Mendelsohn is the sort of writer who takes the oyster as her world rather than the other way around: her book outlines a small space for itself to inhabit and then goes about filling in this space with shadowy patches, daubs of bright color, and areas that seem to be the prose equivalent of white paint. Her novel is, indeed, drenched in visual effects…. Its quiet air of astonishment lends the shine of newness to everything it touches."

Harper's Bazaar said, "Not to be missed. It is an immediately addicting book, as telegraphic as those of Margaret Duras, and as charged with longing." Kirkus Reviews wrote, "Strange, slight, but wonderful: a modest portrait that manages to create moments of exceptional intensity and power of feeling."

The School Library Journal said that the novel “...unfolds with the surreal precision of a dream and that marks first novelist Mendelsohn as a writer to watch…calculatedly lovely and moving," and the Newark Sunday Star-Ledger wrote, "Mendelsohn [is] an exquisite crafter of prose…. Brilliant...is not too strong a word to describe what Mendelsohn has done…. Her novel will hold you spellbound." The Village Voice called it “Insinuating and even addictive...a vehicle for dreaming."
