= Deck the Halls (novel) =

Novel by Mary Higgins Clark and Carol Higgins Clark

- First edition book cover
- Author: Mary Higgins Clark and Carol Higgins Clark
- Publisher: Simon & Schuster
- Publication date: November 1, 2000
- ISBN: 978-0-7432-1200-7

Deck The Halls is a 2003 thriller novel by American authors Mary Higgins Clark and Carol Higgins Clark. The novel was adapted into a 2011 movie for television of the same title by writer Howard Burkons. The movie starred Kathy Najimy, Larry Miller, Jane Alexander and Scottie Thompson. There is a cameo by Carol Higgins Clark. It was directed by Ron Underwood.[5]
