= Crawlspace (1986 film) =

1986 film by David Schmoeller

- Directed by: David Schmoeller
- Written by: David Schmoeller
- Produced by: Roberto Bessi
- Starring: Klaus Kinski; Talia Balsam; Barbara Whinnery; Carole Francis; Tane McClure; Sally Brown; Kenneth Robert Shippy
- Cinematography: Sergio Salvati
- Edited by: Bert Glatstein
- Music by: Pino Donaggio
- Production company: Altar Productions
- Distributed by: Empire Pictures
- Release date: September 26, 1986
- Running time: 80 minutes
- Country: United States
- Language: English
- Budget: $1 million

Crawlspace is a 1986 American horror film written and directed by David Schmoeller, and starring Klaus Kinski, Talia Balsam, Barbara Whinnery, and Tané McClure. Its plot follows Karl Guenther, the crazed son of a Nazi doctor obsessed with trapping young women and slowly torturing them to death in an urban apartment building. The film became infamous due to the on-set conflicts between Schmoeller and Kinski, with claims that producer Roberto Bessi attempted to have Kinski murdered due to his continued hostility towards the crew.

== Plot ==
Having recently moved, 27-year-old Lori Bancroft inquires at a small urban apartment building about an advertised vacancy. The landlord and building superintendent Karl Gunther, an older German man, hospitably gives her a tour of the apartment, telling her that its last tenant was a young woman who disappeared without paying rent. During the tour, Gunther secretly performs a masochistic rite, holding his hand over an open stove-top flame.

Outwardly normal, Gunther leads a double-life as a sadistic, self-loathing psychopath, abducting and torturing his young female tenants and locking them in attic cages, where he removes their tongues and leaves them alive so that he can "have someone to talk to." Once a respectable doctor, he made his living performing euthanasia ("mercy killing") and being ashamed when he learned that his father, a Dachau concentration camp doctor, used the same justification when killing Jewish prisoners in human experiments. Besides regular self-harm, Gunther plays Russian roulette with a loaded handgun, hoping to one day kill himself and end his killing spree with what little morality he has left.

After murdering one of his tenants and removing their eyes, Gunther is visited by Josef Steiner, who has been searching for him for three years. Steiner tells Gunther that in the five years he was chief resident at Buenos Aires hospital, sixty-seven people in his care all died, including Steiner's own brother. He confronts him about his familial history among Nazis, including how his father was executed for crimes against humanity and a photograph of young Karl in a Hitler Youth uniform.

Karl begins spying on and murdering his tenants via the reinforced ventilation crawlspace vents, and a series of mechanized traps he controls from his residence. Like his father, he begins displaying signs of a God complex, reveling in the ability to give life and take it away at will. Steiner attempts to assassinate Gunther, but is instead led into his apartment, where he is killed by one of his traps. Gunther proceeds to pose in an S.S. uniform in front of a mirror and declaring himself his "own god, own jury, and own executioner."

Lori returns home to her apartment to find her refrigerator swarming with live rats and Steiner's corpse in the bathtub, a swastika carved into his forehead. Lori tries to run for help as Gunther sets off security mechanisms that trap her inside the building. Running from door-to-door, she finds her neighbors all killed in similarly brutal fashion. Lori flees into Gunther's attic hideout, where she finds his last surviving caged female prisoner. As Gunther approaches, she manages to sneak through a booby-trapped crawlspace vent. Gunther releases a cage full of rats into the vent after her, but she manages to avoid them and circle back to his room. Gunther pursues her, but appears to inadvertently set off one of his own traps and impale himself with a blade, Lori and the female prisoner take the opportunity to run away. The gaff, however, is only a ploy. As the two run to Karl's apartment to phone the police, he chases them with a knife. Lori grabs Karl's revolver and fires it at him. It clicks empty several times before finally shooting its only round. Karl accepts his death before expiring, declaring "so be it."

== Cast ==
- Klaus Kinski as Dr. Karl Gunther
- Talia Balsam as Lori Bancroft
- Barbara Whinnery as Harriet Watkins
- Carole Francis as Jessica Marlow
- Tane McClure as Sophie Fisher
- Kenneth Robert Shippy as Josef Steiner
- Sally Brown as Martha White
- Jack Heller as Alfred Lassiter
- David Abbott as Hank Peterson
- Sherry Buchanan as Brenda

== Production ==
=== Development ===
In a 2011 interview, director David Schmoeller claims he wrote the first draft of Crawlspace as an anti-Vietnam War tale revolving around a returning vet who decides to recreate a prisoner-of-war camp in his attic. He recounts:

When I turned in the first draft ... [Producer] Charlie Band, of Empire Pictures felt that America was not ready for a Viet Nam story (this was right before Platoon). He suggested we make the protagonist a Nazi! ... I said: "You don't think America is ready for a Viet Nam story – but you DO think they want to see yet another Nazi story?" He said: I'll get you Klaus Kinski. I said: "You get me Klaus Kinski, and I'll make it a Nazi story."... and he got me Klaus ...

=== Casting ===
Schmoeller says that the second draft of the screenplay was written specifically for Kinski, and no other actors were even considered for the part.

Schmoeller says that he was unaware of Kinski's reputation as eccentric and difficult to work with. Prior to filming, the actor allegedly threw a fit over the wardrobe that had been picked out for him, and subsequently went out and bought his own clothes (charging them to the film and keeping them himself afterwards). On set, Kinski clashed severely with other actors and crew members. In his short film about the experience, Schmoeller claims that by the third day of filming, Kinski had started six fistfights and caused the film to fall significantly behind schedule. Schmoeller and the producers attempted to fire him, but Empire Pictures demanded that the bankable star remain. Aside from his combative behavior and bizarre demands (including an order that Schmoeller refrain from saying either "action" or "cut", essentially forcing him to film Kinski continually so he could start and end his scenes whenever he wished) he also refused to say any lines which he didn't like, to the point where, "Scenes were starting not to make sense because he would NOT say this or that line." Co-star Tane McClure later recalled that Schmoeller begged her to stay on set because Kinski (who she claims was "unfortunately, very interested in me") behaved better when she was around. Tensions reached the point of several crew members asking the director to, "Please kill Mr. Kinski"—a request that became the title of Schmoeller's later film about the experience.

=== Filming ===
The film was prepped in Hollywood at the offices of Empire Pictures. Ron Underwood served as associate producer in Los Angeles, and the production was filmed in Rome at Cinecittà Studios. Principal photography began on November 11, 1985, and was completed by March 1986.

Despite the troubled production, Schmoeller has praised Kinski as a performer.

== Release ==
Crawlspace was released theatrically in the United States on September 26, 1986.

=== Home media ===
MGM Home Entertainment released the film on DVD in a double feature with The Attic (1980) as part of their Midnite Movies line on August 27, 2002. Scream Factory released Crawlspace on Blu-ray on December 17, 2013. On February 25, 2025, Kino Lorber reissued the film on Blu-ray as part of their Kino Cult line.

== Reception ==
Crawlspace received a generally negative response from critics.

Michael Wilmington of the Los Angeles Times panned the movie, claiming, "Writer-director David Schmoeller's story construction is so inept that the movie seems to begin during the middle ... Other than Kinski—who projects such inner tension that you wonder if he's trying to suppress laughter—and the sharp cinematography of Sergio Salvati, this movie has nothing worth praising even with a faint damn."

TV Guide gave the film 1 / 4 stars summarizing, "Not as gory as most slasher entries, Crawlspace is instead simply ugly and disturbing".

eFilmCritic.com awarded the film 2 stars calling it "yet another missed opportunity on the four lane highway paved with missed opportunities that the horror genre has turned into".

DVD Talk gave the film a positive review stating "Ultimately this is a little predictable and definitely on the dark and sleazy side, but Kinski delivers the goods here. It's quite well made and genuinely creative at times and it builds to a sufficiently twisted conclusion". Likewise, Patrick Bromley of DVD Verdict also gave the film a positive review, writing, "... Kinski is incapable of being uninteresting as an actor ... Crawlspace ultimately works because there is such a fascinating and compelling villain at its center. Writer/director David Schmoeller ... understands what lightning he has caught with his leading man and makes full use of the actor."

On Rotten Tomatoes, the film holds an approval rating of 17% based on 12 reviews, with a weighted average rating of 4.37/10.

== Please Kill Mr. Kinski ==
The production of Crawlspace was troubled by the disruptive, combative and eccentric behavior of star Klaus Kinski. More than a decade later, in 1999, director David Schmoeller produced and directed a nine-minute film about his experience with Kinski entitled Please Kill Mr. Kinski. In it, the director recounts severe problems working with the notoriously difficult actor (see production section, above). When Empire Pictures declined to allow Schmoeller and his producers to fire the actor, Schmoeller alleges that the "Italian producer" (presumably Roberto Bessi) came up with a plan to have Kinski killed for the insurance money (fortunately, Schmoeller explains, "cooler heads prevailed"). After finding out that Schmoeller and the producers had attempted to have him fired, Kinski became even more difficult to work with, making bizarre requests and causing chaos on the set. By the end of the shoot, Schmoeller claims the entire crew was verbally urging him to "Please kill Mr. Kinski."

Kinski had died in 1991, and at the end of the short Schmoeller expresses some sadness that he was quoted in Kinski's obituary as confirming he was difficult to work with (though he also notes "this was just karma biting him in the ass"). He says he wishes the obituary had quoted him saying, "what a compelling actor he was. How great he was to watch. He really was great to watch."

In a 2011 interview, Schmoeller claims he had been telling the story of his experience with Kinski to other actors for years, but was inspired to make the film when he was approached by the independent filmmaker John Pierson, who had a show on IFC at the time. In the same interview, he flatly denies the suggestion that he at all exaggerated his tales for the film, stating: "The behind-the-scenes footage of Kinski screaming at the crew member; as well as the interview footage with Kinski in my own Please Kill Mr. Kinski – should be enough to document Kinski's volatile behavior. I didn't exaggerate anything in Please Kill Mr. Kinski. As far as I am concerned, Kinski is responsible for all his own 'myth-making.'"

Schmoeller's official website states, "Of all of my work, even the more well-known cult feature films, this short [Please Kill Mr. Kinski] is probably more talked about and more enjoyed than any other single title."
