= David Schmoeller =

American film director

- Born: December 8, 1947 (age 78); Louisville, Kentucky, U.S.
- Occupations: Director; producer; screenwriter
- Years active: 1976–present

David Schmoeller (born December 8, 1947) is an American film director, producer and screenwriter. He is notable for directing several full-length theatrical horror films including Tourist Trap (1979), The Seduction (1982), Crawlspace (1986), Catacombs (1988), Puppet Master (1989), and Netherworld (1992). In May, 2012, Schmoeller was awarded a Lifetime Achievement Award by the Fantaspoa Film Festival in Porto Alegre, Brazil where his new feature film, 2 Little Monsters (2012) was screened along with his other notable films.

== Life and career ==
Schmoeller was born in Louisville, Kentucky, and was raised and educated in Texas. He completed a Masters program in Radio-Television-Film at the University of Texas at Austin. Fluent in Spanish, he was briefly an interpreter for ABC Sports during the 1968 Olympics in Mexico City.

He spent six months as an intern with writer-director Peter Hyams on the film Capricorn One, before writing and directing his first theatrical feature, Tourist Trap (1979).

Tourist Trap was based on Schmoeller's University of Texas thesis film The Spider Will Kill You. Shot in 24 days, it features a score by Pino Donaggio, performances from Chuck Connors and Tanya Roberts, and contains sound effects culled from The Time Machine (1960) and Gone with the Wind (1939). Though it was not a major hit at the time, it has since developed a cult following and been praised by renowned horror author Stephen King (who lauded the film as an obscure classic in his book Danse Macabre (1981)). Tourist Trap would also mark Schmoeller's first collaboration with executive producer Charles Band, who would produce several of Schmoeller's films, first though his own production company and later with Empire International Pictures and Full Moon Features.

For his sophomore film, Schmoeller directed The Seduction (1982), a thriller film starring Morgan Fairchild and Andrew Stevens. The film was not well-received and generated several Golden Raspberry nominations (though it won none of them).

He followed the Seduction with 1986's Crawlspace (which he wrote and directed), a horror film starring famously difficult actor Klaus Kinski. Kinski's on-set antics would later inspire Schmoeller's short film about the subject entitled Please Kill Mr. Kinski.

Next, he co-wrote and directed Catacombs starring Timothy Van Patten. The film was shot in only 20 days, and was subsequently delayed from being released for almost five years due to the financial problems of distributor Empire International Pictures. When it was finally released direct-to-video in 1993, it was re-titled Curse IV: The Ultimate Sacrifice by Columbia TriStar Home Video, despite being completely unrelated to the series of films which began with The Curse in 1987.

With Catacombs completed but still not released, Schmoeller moved on to direct another horror film, Puppet Master, in 1989. Producer and writer Charles Band—previously the head of the now-failed Empire International Pictures—produced the film under the name of his new company Full Moon Productions (later renamed Full Moon Features). Many of the puppet characters Schmoeller created for Puppet Master have appeared in the various sequels produced by Full Moon Features, though Schmoeller himself was not involved.

In 1991, Schmoeller directed horror-themed science fiction tale The Arrival starring John Saxon. The following year, he released another horror film, the direct-to-video Netherworld (again produced by Band for Full Moon Entertainment). In 1998, he directed the sci-fi/adventure film The Secret Kingdom. Following its release, he would not direct another feature film until 2009.

In the early 1990s, he directed several episodes for television series such as Silk Stalkings and Renegade, and also directed a TV movie called Search for the Jewel of Polaris: Mysterious Museum in 1999.

In recent years, Schmoeller has produced many of his own film projects including the full-length feature Thor at the Bus Stop (2009) as well as the notable shorts Please Kill Mr. Kinski (1999), Spanking Lessons (2007), Wedding Day (2008) and the short horror film Ha, Ha Horror (2012).

He also served as a dialogue writer and director for the English-dubbed version of the anime film Nausicaä of the Valley of the Wind in 1984 when it was re-titled Warriors of the Wind by Manson International.

His most recent film, the full-length feature film titled 2 Little Monsters, was released in 2012. The film is a psychological drama fictionalizing the modern life of notorious child killers Robert Thompson and Jon Venables, who in 1993 were convicted of the murder of James Bulger. The film's subject matter marks a departure for the director, who had previously been associated with films in the fantasy and horror genres. To get the film made, Schmoeller self-financed it for what he describes as, "a really small sum, about 30 times less than Tourist Trap." The same year, Schmoeller also appeared in the 2013 documentary Rewind This! about the impact of VHS on the film industry and home video.

He is currently employed as a film professor at the University of Nevada, Las Vegas.

== Filmography (as director) ==
=== Films ===
- The Spider Will Kill You (1976)
- Tourist Trap (1979)
- The Seduction (1982)
- Crawlspace (1986)
- Catacombs (1988)
- Puppet Master (1989)
- The Arrival (1991)
- Netherworld (1992)
- The Secret Kingdom (1998)
- Mysterious Museum (1999)
- Please Kill Mr. Kinski (1999) (documentary short film)
- Wedding Day (2008) (short film)
- Two Frenchmen Lost in Las Vegas (2010) (short film)
- The Price of Beautiful (2010) (short film)
- The Rules of House-sitting (2010) (short film)
- 2 Little Monsters (2012)
- Ha, Ha Horror (2012) (Short film)

=== Television series (as director) ===
- Silk Stalkings (TV series) (1992–1993)
- Renegade (TV series) (1992)
