= Talia Balsam =

American actress (born 1959)

- Balsam in 2026
- Born: March 5, 1959 (age 67); New York City, U.S.
- Occupation: Actress
- Years active: 1977–present
- Spouses: George Clooney (m. 1989; div. 1993) John Slattery (m. 1998)
- Children: 1
- Parents: Martin Balsam; Joyce Van Patten
- Relatives: Dick Van Patten (uncle); Tim Van Patten (half-uncle); Nels Van Patten (cousin); Vincent Van Patten (cousin); Grace Van Patten (half-cousin)

Talia Balsam (born March 5, 1959) is an American actress.

== Early life ==
Talia Balsam was born in New York City in 1959, to actors Martin Balsam and Joyce Van Patten. Her ancestry is Russian Jewish (father) and Italian, Dutch, and English (mother). She is the niece of actor Dick Van Patten, actress Pat Van Patten, and actor/director Tim Van Patten, and the cousin of actress Grace Van Patten.

== Career ==
Balsam began her career appearing in a recurring role on the ABC sitcom Happy Days and later appeared in a number of shows, including Dallas, Taxi, Hill Street Blues, Family Ties, The Larry Sanders Show, and Magnum, P.I. Balsam also played leading roles in films Crawlspace (1986) and In the Mood (1987). She also appeared in a number of made-for-television movies, including Kent State (1981), Nadia (1984), and Consenting Adult (1985). Balsam continued playing supporting film roles and guest starred on television through 1990s and 2000s, include The Cake Eaters (2007), L.A. Doctors (1998–99) and Without a Trace (2003–04).

From 2007 to 2014, Balsam had a recurring role as Mona Sterling in the AMC period drama series Mad Men. In 2012, she also had a recurring role in the Showtime thriller Homeland as Cynthia Walden. From 2016 to 2019, she starred opposite Sarah Jessica Parker in the HBO comedy series, Divorce.

== Personal life ==
Balsam married actor George Clooney in Las Vegas in 1989; they were divorced in 1993. In an interview with Vanity Fair after their divorce, Clooney stated, "I probably (definitely) wasn't someone who should have been married at that point. I just don't feel like I gave Talia a fair shot."

Since 1998, Balsam has been married to John Slattery, with whom she has a son. They married in Kauaʻi, Hawaii. They played husband and wife Roger and Mona Sterling in Mad Men. As of 2015, Balsam was living with her family in SoHo, Manhattan.

== Filmography ==
=== Film ===
Year	Title	Role	Notes
1979	Sunnyside	Ann Rosario	
1984	Mass Appeal	Liz Dolson	
1986	Crawlspace	Lori Bancroft	
1986	The Supernaturals	Pvt. Angela Lejune	
1987	The Kindred	Sharon Raymond	
1987	In the Mood	Judy Cusimano	
1987	P.I. Private Investigations	Jenny Fox	
1989	Trust Me	Catherine Walker	
1991	The Walter Ego	Susie the Whore	Short film
1991	Killer Instinct	Emma	
1995	Coldblooded	Jean Alexander	
1997	Camp Stories	Mary	
1999	Valerie Flake	Linda	
2002	Emmett's Mark	Suzanne	
2005	Little Manhattan	Jackie Telesco	
2006	All the King's Men	Lucy Stark	
2007	The Cake Eaters	Violet Kaminski	
2008	The Wackness	Mrs. Shapiro	
2009	The Broadroom	Julie	Video short
2010	Conviction	Prosecuting Attorney	
2011	Return	Julie	
2011	No Strings Attached	Sandra Kurtzman	
2011	Choose	Clarissa	
2015	Don't Worry Baby	Miriam Lang	
2015	The Girl in the Book	Mom	
2016	Little Men	Audrey	
2019	The Climb	Suzi	
2019	South Mountain	Lila	
2020	Worth	Dede Feinberg	
2021	With/In: Volume 1		Segment: "Intersection"
2021	The Many Saints of Newark	Mrs. Jarecki	
2022	Master	Diandra	
2023	Late Bloomers	Dorothy	
2025	Omaha	Edie	Completed

=== Television ===
Year	Title	Role	Notes
1977	Happy Days	Nancy Croft	"Hollywood: Parts 1−3"
1978	The Initiation of Sarah	Allison	TV film
1978	Stickin' Together	Grace Geary	TV film
1978	Fast Lane Blues	Dolly	TV film
1978	Dallas	Rita Briggs	"Black Market Baby"
1978	The Millionaire	Doreen	TV film
1978–1980	Taxi	Cathy Consuelos	"Like Father, Like Daughter", "Fathers of the Bride"
1979	The Survival of Dana	Rona	TV film
1979	The Runaways	Diana Robinson	"Wrong Way Street"
1980	OHMS	Noranne Wing	TV film
1980	Archie Bunker's Place	Beverly Klein-Munoz	"Murray's Daughter"
1980	When the Whistle Blows	Sharon Jenkins	"Beauty Pageant"
1981	Kent State	Sandy Scheuer	TV film
1981	Crazy Times	Eve	TV film
1982	Hill Street Blues	Sally	"Some Like It Hot-Wired"
1983	Cagney & Lacey	Diane	"Affirmative Action"
1983	Family Ties	Carrie Newman	"Tender Is the Knight"
1984	Calamity Jane	Jean Irene O'Neill	TV film
1984	Magnum, P.I.	Emily Jackson	"On Face Value"
1984	Punky Brewster	Miranda 'Randi' Mitchell	"Punky Finds a Home: Parts 2 & 3"
1985	Consenting Adult	Margie	TV film
1985	Murder, She Wrote	Debbie Delancey	"Footnote to Murder"
1987	The Ladies	Linda	TV film
1988	Tour of Duty	Vickie Adams	"Pushin' Too Hard"
1988	Tales from the Hollywood Hills: Golden Land	Verna	TV film
1989–1990	Thirtysomething	Paige	"Michael's Campaign", "Pulling Away"
1990	Murder, She Wrote	Julie Pritzer	"Murder: According to Maggie"
1991	Sins of the Mother	Liz Trent	TV film
1991	Life Goes On	Ms. Melanie Karlsen	"Ghost of Grandpa Past"
1991	Stat	Rita Falco	"Psychosomatic"
1991	Jake and the Fatman	Cathy Reno	"Come Along with Me"
1991	Past Imperfect	Jill	TV film
1992	Law & Order	Turner	"Consultation"
1993	The Larry Sanders Show	Dora	"Being There"
1993	Mad About You	Debbie	"The Unplanned Child"
1994	The Companion	Charlene	TV film
1995	Diagnosis: Murder	Tonya Gilpin	"Call Me Incontestable"
1995	Touched by an Angel	Dr. Joanne Glassberg	"In the Name of God"
1995	Almost Perfect	Jeannie Guthrie	"A Dog Day Afternoon", "You Like Me, You Really Like Me", "The Ex-Files"
1996	Law & Order	Teri Marks	"Remand"
1997	Early Edition	Dr. Robbin English	"The Cat"
1997–1998	Profiler	Monica Sikes	"Old Acquaintance", "Jack Be Nimble, Jack Be Quick"
1998	Nothing Sacred	Laura	"A Nun's Story"
1998	The Love Boat: The Next Wave	Diana Wilson	"Smooth Sailing"
1998	Ghosts of Fear Street	Anne Murphy	
1998–1999	L.A. Doctors	Julie Lonner	Recurring role
1999	Ally McBeal	Shelia Kent	"Angels and Blimps"
2000	Schimmel	Kathy	TV film
2000	The Street	Mrs. Nicole Mason	"Hostile Makeover"
2003	Third Watch	Mrs. Beckman	"In Confidence"
2003	K Street	Gail	Recurring role
2003–2004	Without a Trace	Maria Malone	Recurring role
2005	Into the Fire	Dr. Linda Boyle	TV film
2005	Commander in Chief	Ruth	"Pilot"
2006	Law & Order: Criminal Intent	Victoria Carson	"Wrongful Life"
2007–2014	Mad Men	Mona Sterling Pike	Recurring role
2008	Wainy Days	Carol	"Carol"
2009	FlashForward	Surgeon Gen. Anita Ralston	"Gimme Some Truth"
2010	Treme	Carla Hall	"Shallow Water, Oh Mama"
2012	Homeland	Cynthia Walden	Recurring role
2013	Elementary	Cheryl Gregson	"An Unnatural Arrangement"
2013–2014	The Good Wife	Anne Stevens	"A Precious Commodity", "Goliath and David"
2014	The Newsroom	Toni Dodd	"Contempt"
2016–2019	Divorce	Dallas Holt	Regular role
2017	Z: The Beginning of Everything	Anne Ober	Recurring role
2021	Girls5eva	Herself	"Alf Musik"
2021	The Premise	Prosecutor	"Social Justice Sex Tape"
2023	Wilderness	Bonnie	Main cast
2026	High Value Target: The Hunt for Saddam	Angela Jenkins	4 episodes
