= Michael David Heller =

Marketing executive

Michael Heller
- Heller in 2025
- Education: Juris Doctor
- Alma mater: New York University; Benjamin N. Cardozo School of Law
- Known for: Founder, Talent Resources
- Website: Michael Heller

Michael David Heller is the principal of Talent Resources, a global marketing agency.

== Biography ==
Heller attended New York University where he earned a Bachelor's degree before attending Benjamin N. Cardozo School of Law where he earned a Juris Doctor. One of Heller's first ventures was 4 Degrees, a marketing and event company that produced Mariah Carey's 2005 New Year's Eve Party. He transitioned into entertainment law in the early 2000s and was manager to Lindsay Lohan.

In 2007, Heller founded the firm Talent Resources, which connects celebrities and brands for product placement. It was named one of America's fastest growing companies in 2023 by The Financial Times. Heller has negotiated commercial campaigns on behalf of Avril Lavigne, Paris Hilton and The Kardashians, as well as producing campaigns and events from the Super Bowl to Bloomberg Summits.

== Filmography ==
| Year | Film | Role | Notes |
|---|---|---|---|
| 2012 | Arbitrage | Producer | |
| 2012 | Innocence | Producer | |
| 2013 | Adult World | Producer | |
