= Jane Mendelsohn =

American writer (born 1965)

- Born: 1965 (age 60–61); New York City, U.S.
- Education: Horace Mann School; Yale University; Yale Law School
- Occupation: Writer
- Spouse: Nick Davis
- Children: 2

Jane Simone Mendelsohn (born 1965) is an American writer. Her novels are known for their mythic themes, poetic imagery, and allegorical content, as well as themes of female and personal empowerment. Mendelsohn's novel I Was Amelia Earhart was an international bestseller in 1996 and was shortlisted for the Orange Prize for Fiction.

== Background and personal life ==
Mendelsohn, the daughter of a psychiatrist and an art historian, was born in New York City. She attended Horace Mann School in New York, though she spent her seventh- and eighth-grade years living in Toronto before returning to New York. She is a graduate of Yale University 1987, summa cum laude, Phi Beta Kappa. She attended Yale Law School for one and a half years before beginning a career as a writer/journalist. In her twenties, she worked as an assistant to the literary editor at The Village Voice and as a tutor at Yale University. Mendelsohn is married and lives in New York with her husband, filmmaker Nick Davis, and two daughters, Lily and Grace.

== Journalism ==
Mendelsohn’s book reviews and other journalism have appeared in The New York Times, The London Review of Books, The New Republic, The Guardian, The Yale Review, Lit Hub, and other publications.

== Novels ==
- I Was Amelia Earhart (1996)
- Innocence (2000)
- American Music (2010)
- Burning Down the House (2016)

Mendelsohn’s debut novel, I Was Amelia Earhart, tells the fictional account of the days leading up to, and after, the mid-flight disappearance of legendary aviator Amelia Earhart and her navigator in 1937. The book appeared on The New York Times Best Seller list for 14 weeks in 1996, and drew widespread critical praise, with many reviewers admiring the book’s poetic and mythic qualities. Michiko Kakutani wrote in The New York Times, “In this lyrical first novel...Ms. Mendelsohn has chosen to use the bare-boned outlines of the aviator’s life as an armature for a poetic meditation on freedom and love and flight…. The resulting novel...invokes the spirit of a mythic personage, while standing on its own as a powerfully imagined work of fiction. Ms. Mendelsohn invests her story with force of fable”. Daphne Merkin wrote in The New Yorker that the novel “appears like a flash of silver in the leaden skies of contemporary fiction. It is a haunting and delicate piece of guesswork…. Mendelsohn is the sort of writer who takes the oyster as her world rather than the other way around: her book outlines a small space for itself to inhabit and then goes about filling in this space with shadowy patches, daubs of bright color, and areas that seem to be the prose equivalent of white paint. Her novel is, indeed, drenched in visual effects…. Its quiet air of astonishment lends the shine of newness to everything it touches." The novel was a literary sensation and was shortlisted for the 1997 Orange Prize.

Innocence, published in 2000, also received positive reviews. It tells the coming-of-age story of Beckett, a teenager whose mother has been killed in a tragic accident; grappling simultaneously with this loss, a rash of apparent suicides at her new school, and the significance of her first period, Beckett becomes entangled in a dark, mysterious world in which beauty and youth are everything, and dark forces will go to great lengths to retain them. Reviewers admired the allegorical qualities of the gothic horror tale and the poetry of the writing, while others read the book as straightforward genre fiction. The Village Voice wrote, “Innocence is a kind of Rosemary’s Baby channeled through J.D. Salinger…. It’s a graceful, delusionary teenage thriller unusually in touch with young character’s emotional workings, and, at the same time, a book by someone who clearly understands the tricks that make Stephen King’s pages turn.” Kirkus Reviews also praised the book: “Invoking a battery of analogues favoring the pop-culture heroines of Alice in Wonderland, The Wizard of Oz, Lolita, and Halloween, Mendelsohn isolates her plucky heroine so fearfully via sparse paragraphs and an underpeopled world that even the most preposterous threats leap out of the move frame to fuel a shriek of pure paranoia. Must reading for anybody who thinks teenagers today have gotten bloated with entitlement: a scarlet will-o’-the-wisp fantasy in which adults and adulthood aren’t stupid stiffs but agents of unimaginable evil.”

American Music, published in 2010, tells the story of Milo, an Iraq War veteran with PTSD, and Honor, his somatic therapist. Through a series of visions, which overtake both every time they touch, they uncover a family story unfolding through history and tied together by music. The praise for the book was nearly universal, with many critics commending Mendelsohn for her haunting and lyrical style and her storytelling abilities. The New York Times Book Review said that American Music redefined the genre of the multigenerational family story: “Exacting, moving, devastating, American Music is a story told in dazzling images…. How can something so slim cover so much ground? This breadth is achieved through a series of haunting impressions that trace the story of a family, the history of 20th-century America, and the evolution of American music…. It is a testament to Mendelsohn’s skill that she can decode a lifetime in an image.” Ron Charles wrote in The Washington Post, “A novel about the power of stories…. What a captivating storyteller Mendelsohn can be. She’s remarkably good at setting scenes quickly and evocatively, raising up characters we care about immediately and drawing us into their conflicts…. A romantic story of romantic stories, full of love and longing, despair and loneliness, and one woman’s connection to all of them…. [Mendelsohn] writes the kind of lovely, wise phrases that will have you underlining passages.” Kate Christensen wrote in a lead review for Elle, “Unpretentious, moving, intelligent, and fresh . . . An inventive, passionate, pithy novel whose major theme is love itself and whose minor theme, music, is an emotional, meaningful counterpoint. Like Count Basie and His Orchestra, this book swings.” Donna Seaman gave the book a starred Booklist review, writing, “In her exquisite, psychologically fluent novels, the actual and imagined merge as Mendelsohn tests the power of stories to define, guide, and sometimes destroy us. Her third novel is an intricate puzzle of haunting, far-reaching, secretly connected love stories…. Each milieu is sensuously rendered, while music, especially jazz, serves as the unifying force, and the key to surviving epic desire and loss.” Mendelsohn is currently adapting the novel into a musical, commissioned by the American Repertory Theater in Cambridge, Massachusetts.

Burning Down the House, Mendelsohn’s most recent book, about the rivalries and secrets of a wealthy New York real estate clan, was published in 2016. Donna Seaman gave the novel a Booklist starred review, writing, “With gorgeous, feverishly imaginative descriptions of her tormented characters’ psyches, and settings ranging from Manhattan to Istanbul to Laos, Mendelsohn, oracular, dazzling, and shocking, creates a maelstrom of tragic failings and crimes.” Andrew Solomon, a National Book Critics Circle Award winner for his nonfiction book Far from the Tree, noted the novel’s prescience, writing, “With her devastating eye for the telling detail, her always penetrating insight, and her quiet wit, Jane Mendelsohn has written a book for the ages, an extraordinary investigation of human vanity and vulnerability, of power and disenfranchisement, of luxury and sorrow. Her writing is both taut and lush, her wounded characters both extravagant and authentic, her story grand yet intimate. This is literature of the first order.”

== Awards ==
- 1997 Orange Prize, shortlist, I Was Amelia Earhart
- 1998 Dublin Literary Award, longlist, I Was Amelia Earhart
