= Tremors (franchise) =

American film series and television show

- Official American DVD collection cover
- Created by: S. S. Wilson; Brent Maddock; Ron Underwood
- Original work: Tremors (1990)
- Owner: Universal Pictures
- Years: 1990–2020

Films and television
- Films: List of films
- Television series: Tremors (2003)

Games
- Video games: List of video games

The Tremors franchise consists of a series of American monster comedy-horror films and a spin-off television show, with a plot centered around attacks from subterranean worm-like creatures known as Graboids. It began in 1990 with the release of Tremors, which spawned a series of direct-to-video films and a television series. A second television series was ordered to air on Syfy, and a pilot was shot for the spring of 2018, but the project was ultimately cancelled.

== Films ==
Film	U.S. release date	Director(s)	Screenwriter(s)	Story by	Producer(s)
Tremors	January 19, 1990	Ron Underwood	Brent Maddock and S. S. Wilson	Ron Underwood and Brent Maddock and S. S. Wilson	Gale Anne Hurd, Brent Maddock and S. S. Wilson
Tremors 2: Aftershocks	April 9, 1996	S. S. Wilson	Brent Maddock and S. S. Wilson	Brent Maddock and S. S. Wilson	Nancy Roberts and Christopher DeFaria
Tremors 3: Back to Perfection	October 2, 2001	Brent Maddock	John Whelpley	Brent Maddock, S. S. Wilson and Nancy Roberts	S. S. Wilson and Nancy Roberts
Tremors 4: The Legend Begins	January 2, 2004	S. S. Wilson	Scott Buck	Brent Maddock, S. S. Wilson and Nancy Roberts	Nancy Roberts
Tremors 5: Bloodlines	October 6, 2015	Don Michael Paul	William Truesmith and M. A. Deuce and John Whelpley	William Truesmith, M. A. Deuce and C.J. Strebor	Ogden Gavanski
Tremors: A Cold Day in Hell	May 1, 2018	Don Michael Paul	John Whelpley	John Whelpley	Mike Elliott
Tremors: Shrieker Island	October 20, 2020	Don Michael Paul	Don Michael Paul and Brian Brightly	Brian Brightly	Todd Williams and Chris Lowenstein

=== Tremors (1990) ===
Tremors is a 1990 American monster film directed by Ron Underwood, with a screenplay by S. S. Wilson and Brent Maddock, starring Kevin Bacon, Fred Ward, Finn Carter, Michael Gross and Reba McEntire. It was distributed by Universal Pictures.

=== Tremors 2: Aftershocks (1996) ===
Tremors 2: Aftershocks is a 1996 action-horror sequel to Tremors, in which the character of Earl Bassett, returning from the first movie, is hired to deal with a subterranean "Graboid" infestation at a Mexican oilfield. It was directed by S. S. Wilson, and stars Fred Ward, Christopher Gartin, Michael Gross and Helen Shaver. It introduced a new creature called the Shriekers.

=== Tremors 3: Back to Perfection (2001) ===
Tremors 3: Back to Perfection is a 2001 comedic monster film, the third in the "Tremors" series featuring the subterranean worm-creatures dubbed "Graboids". It was directed by Brent Maddock and stars Michael Gross. Like the second movie, the film was not released in theaters. It introduced a new creature called the Ass-Blaster.

=== Tremors 4: The Legend Begins (2004) ===
Tremors 4: The Legend Begins is a 2004 direct-to-video movie. It is the fourth film in the "Tremors" series of monster films. It is a prequel to the earlier movies and featured Michael Gross as the ancestor to his original character in the first Tremors film.

=== Tremors 5: Bloodlines (2015) ===
Tremors 5: Bloodlines was produced in South Africa, featuring a returning Michael Gross and new co-star Jamie Kennedy. It also stars Natalie Becker. The film was released on Blu-ray, DVD and Digital HD on October 6, 2015. Though it is based on a script written by Brent Maddock and S. S. Wilson in 2004, the original creators declined to be involved due to a lack of creative control over the project. It received mixed reviews.

=== Tremors: A Cold Day in Hell (2018) ===
On September 20, 2016, Michael Gross announced on his official Facebook page that a sixth film was in development. Tremors 5 co-star Jamie Kennedy returned, along with director Don Michael Paul. Filming commenced in late January 2017. The film was released on DVD and Blu-ray in May 2018.

=== Tremors: Shrieker Island (2020) ===
On December 13, 2018, Michael Gross confirmed that Universal had ordered a seventh entry in the series and that he would return to star, stating "Tremors fans will be delighted to know I have just agreed to the terms of a contract for a seventh film. My best estimate is that Burt Gummer will begin his hunt for Graboids and other nefarious forms of wildlife in the fall of 2019." On November 13, 2019, filming began in Thailand. On November 26, 2019, Jon Heder, Jackie Cruz, and Richard Brake signed on to star alongside Gross. On December 12, 2019, Gross confirmed that filming had wrapped. In August 2020, the film was known under the working title Island Fury until it was officially titled Tremors: Shrieker Island. The film was released direct-to-video on October 20, 2020.

=== Future ===
In a podcast with Bloody Disgusting, Gross mentioned that "part of me that feels that Universal Home Entertainment might've had enough of Tremors", though he followed up by saying "The door is still open for an eighth Tremors. It may seem unlikely by what people see on the screen, but it is possible. There could be an eighth. And if there were, and if it were an interesting story, I would be up for it because Burt is always a great deal of fun. It would depend on his physicality. How much they want me to do. If it's in another two years, I'll be 75 years old. So I will continue to hope and pray that I stay in shape, to do what is asked of me – if it is asked of me." Gross later said on Facebook "There are no guarantees, but for those who wonder aloud if this is the final film, I will say what I have said before: SALES drive sequels. Show biz is 5% show and 95% business, so if this latest addition to the Tremors franchise, sells well, Universal Studios Hollywood will follow the money, and Universal Pictures Home Entertainment may will [sic] be back for more." In April 2025, it was announced that Stampede Entertainment had reclaimed the rights to the original screenplay and are discussing a "return to Perfection" sequel, with hopes of getting Kevin Bacon to return as Val.

== Television ==
=== Tremors (2003) ===
Tremors is a television spin-off of the Tremors franchise which originally ran on Syfy, with one half-season of 13 episodes aired before being cancelled.

Series	Season	Episodes	First released	Last released	Showrunner(s)	Network(s)
Tremors	1	13	March 28, 2003	August 8, 2003	Nancy Roberts	Syfy

== Cast and crew ==
=== Principal cast ===
Character	Films							Television series
Character	Tremors	Tremors 2: Aftershocks	Tremors 3: Back to Perfection	Tremors 4: The Legend Begins	Tremors 5: Bloodlines	Tremors: A Cold Day in Hell	Tremors: Shrieker Island	Tremors
Character	1990	1996	2001	2004	2015	2018	2020	2003
Burt Gummer	Michael Gross	Michael Gross	Michael Gross		Michael Gross	Michael Gross	Michael Gross	Michael Gross
Hiram Gummer				Michael Gross				
Earl Bassett	Fred Ward	Fred Ward						
Valentine "Val" McKee	Kevin Bacon							
Rhonda LeBeck	Finn Carter							
Nancy Sterngood	Charlotte Stewart		Charlotte Stewart					Marcia Strassman
Mindy Sterngood	Ariana Richards		Ariana Richards					Tinsley Grimes
Melvin Plug	Robert Jayne		Robert Jayne					Robert Jayne
Miguel	Tony Genaro		Tony Genaro					
Heather Gummer	Reba McEntire							
Walter Chang	Victor Wong							
Nestor Cunningham	Richard Marcus							
Fred "Old Fred"	Michael Dan Wagner			J.E. Freeman				
Edgar Deems	Sunshine Parker							
Jim Wallace	Conrad Bachmann							
Megan Wallace	Bibi Besch							
Howard	John Goodwin							
Carmine	John Pappas							
Grady Hoover		Christopher Gartin						
Dr. Kate Riley		Helen Shaver						
Julio		Marco A. Hernandez						
Señor Carlos Ortega		Marcelo Tubert						
Pedro		Jose Ramon Rosario						
Jack "Desert Jack" Sawyer			Shawn Christian					
Jodi Chang			Susan Chuang					Lela Lee
Buford			Billy Rieck					
Dr. Andrew Merliss			Barry Livingston					
Agent Charlie Rusk			John Pappas					
Agent Frank Statler			Tom Everett					
Juan Pedilla				Brent Roam				
Pyong Chang				Lo Ming				
Lu Wan Chang				Lydia Look				
Fu Yien Chang				Sam Ly				
Christine Lord				Sara Botsford				
"Black Hand" Kelly				Billy Drago				
Tecopa				August Schellenberg				
Travis Welker					Jamie Kennedy	Jamie Kennedy		
Dr. Nandi Montabu					Pearl Thusi			
Johan Dreyer					Brandon Auret			
Baruti					Rea Rangaka			
Erick van Wyk					Daniel Janks			
Den Bravers					Ian Roberts			
Lucia					Natalie Becker			
Ndebele Chieftain					Ernest Ndhlovu			
Dr. Rita Sims						Tanya van Graan		
Valerie McKee						Jamie-Lee Money		
Hart Hansen						Kiroshan Naidoo		
Aklark						Keeno Lee Hecto		
Swackhamer						Rob van Vuuren		
Mac						Adrienne Pearce		
Dr. Charles Ferezze						Francesco Nassimbeni		
Mr. Cutts						Paul du Toit		
Geo-Tech Vargas						Christie Peruso		
Dr. D						Jay Anstey		
Jimmy							Jon Heder	
Freddie							Jackie Cruz	
Bill							Richard Brake	
Jasmine "Jas" Welker							Caroline Langrishe	
Anna							Cassie Clare	
"Mr. Bowtie"							Sahajak Boonthanakit	
"Wall Street"							Randy Kalsi	
Ishimon							Boonma Lamphon	
Researcher Iris							Iris Park	
Parkour Boy							Aukrawut Rojaunawat	
"Mohawk"							Bear Williams	
Tyler Reed								Victor Browne
Rosalita Sanchez								Gladys Jimenez
W.D. Twitchell								Dean Norris
Larry Norvel								J. D. Walsh
Dr. Cletus Poffenberger								Christopher Lloyd
Harlowe Winnemucca								Branscombe Richmond
Dr. Casey Matthews								Sarah Rafferty
Roger Garrett								Richard Biggs
Frank								Nicholas Turturro

=== Additional crew ===
Film	Crew and information					
Film	Composer(s)	Cinematographer	Editor	Production companies	Distributing companies	Running time
Tremors	Ernest Troost	Alexander Gruszynski	O. Nicholas Brown	Universal Pictures, No Frills Film Productions, Wilson-Maddock Productions	Universal Pictures	96 minutes
Tremors 2: Aftershocks	Jay Ferguson	Virgil L. Harper	Bob Ducsay	MCA/Universal Pictures, Stampede Entertainment	MCA/Universal Pictures, MCA Home Entertainment	97 minutes
Tremors 3: Back to Perfection	Kevin Kiner	Virgil L. Harper	Drake Silliman	Universal Family and Home Entertainment, Stampede Entertainment	Universal Family and Home Entertainment	104 minutes
Tremors 4: The Legend Begins	Jay Ferguson	Virgil L. Harper	Harry B. Miller, III	Stampede Entertainment	Universal Pictures Home Entertainment	101 minutes
Tremors 5: Bloodlines	Frederik Wiedmann	Michael Swan	Vanick Moradian	Universal 1440 Entertainment, Capacity Relations	Universal Pictures Home Entertainment, Syfy	99 minutes
Tremors: A Cold Day in Hell	Frederik Wiedmann & Brain Mantia	Hein de Vos	Cameron Hallenbeck	Universal 1440 Entertainment	Universal Studios, Universal Pictures Home Entertainment	98 minutes
Tremors: Shrieker Island	Frederik Wiedmann	Alexander Krumov	Heath Ryan	Universal 1440 Entertainment	Universal Studios, Universal Pictures Home Entertainment	103 minutes

== Production ==
=== Attraction ===
While only the first film was filmed in Lone Pine, California, there is an exhibit dedicated to Tremors in the Lone Pine Film History Museum. The exhibit contains film props such as the Graboid head used to burst through the ground, a miniature of Chang's Market used in Tremors 4: The Legend Begins, and a mount of a Graboid used in Tremors 2: Aftershocks.

== Reception ==
=== Academy of Science Fiction, Fantasy & Horror Films, USA Awards ===
Award	Film						
Award	Tremors	Tremors 2: Aftershocks	Tremors 3: Back to Perfection	Tremors 4: The Legend Begins	Tremors 5: Bloodlines	Tremors: A Cold Day in Hell	Tremors: Shrieker Island
Best Science Fiction Film	Nomination						
Best Special Effects	Nomination						
Best Home Video Release		Nomination					
Best Supporting Actress - Finn Carter	Nomination						
Best Supporting Actress - Reba McEntire	Nomination						

=== Young Artist Awards ===
Award	Film						
Award	Tremors	Tremors 2: Aftershocks	Tremors 3: Back to Perfection	Tremors 4: The Legend Begins	Tremors 5: Bloodlines	Tremors: A Cold Day in Hell	Tremors: Shrieker Island
Best Young Actress Supporting Role in a Motion Picture - Ariana Richards	Nomination						

=== DVD Exclusive Awards ===
Award	Film						
Award	Tremors	Tremors 2: Aftershocks	Tremors 3: Back to Perfection	Tremors 4: The Legend Begins	Tremors 5: Bloodlines	Tremors: A Cold Day in Hell	Tremors: Shrieker Island
Best Actor - Michael Gross			Won				
Best Visual Effects - Linda Drake			Nomination				
Best Actress (in a DVD Premiere Movie) - Sara Botsford				Nomination			

=== Motion Picture Sound Editors, USA Awards ===
Award	Film						
Award	Tremors	Tremors 2: Aftershocks	Tremors 3: Back to Perfection	Tremors 4: The Legend Begins	Tremors 5: Bloodlines	Tremors: A Cold Day in Hell	Tremors: Shrieker Island
Best Sound Editing - Direct to Video			Nomination				

== Other media ==
=== Video games ===
- Dirt Dragons is a browser game tie-in to the 2004 film Tremors 4: The Legend Begins.
- Tremerz, released in 2010 by Newgrounds, is an online 8-bit video game adaptation of the original Tremors film.
- Universal Movie Tycoon is a sim-city-building game released in 2012 for iOS, developed by Fuse Powered Inc. and published by Bytemark Games, that featured the Tremors film.
- Tremors: The Game was to be a video game based on the franchise, announced in August 2002 by Rock Solid Studios. It was scheduled for release during the fall of 2003. However, the game was quietly cancelled in the summer of that year.

=== Cancelled television series ===
During the production of Tremors 2: Aftershocks, a television series titled Tremors 2: Aftershocks – The Lost Monsters! was being developed by Universal Television and Stampede Entertainment. According to Stampede, "[the] series premise was that, after their success in fighting the Graboids, Val and Earl would be sought out by the readers of tabloid newspapers, believers in UFOs, etc. to battle other little-known creatures".

On November 28, 2015, it was reported that Universal Television and Blumhouse Productions were developing a new Tremors TV series and that Kevin Bacon would reprise his role of Valentine McKee for the first time in the series since the first film. In September 2016, it was announced the series was moving forward at Amazon Prime Video, however, in June 2017, the pilot was moved to Syfy. In August 2017, it was announced that Vincenzo Natali would direct the pilot which would be written by showrunner Andrew Miller with filming taking place from late October 2017 through November 2017. On April 28, 2018, it was announced that Syfy had passed on the pilot.
