= 20th Saturn Awards =

US film and television award ceremony

- Date: October 20, 1994
- Site: California, U.S.

Highlights
- Most awards: Jurassic Park (4)
- Most nominations: Jurassic Park (11)

The 20th Saturn Awards, presented by the Academy of Science Fiction, Fantasy and Horror Films and honoring the best in science fiction, fantasy, and horror belonging to genre fiction in film, television and home video in 1993, were held on October 20, 1994.

== Winners and nominees ==
Below is a complete list of nominees and winners. Winners are highlighted in bold.

=== Film ===
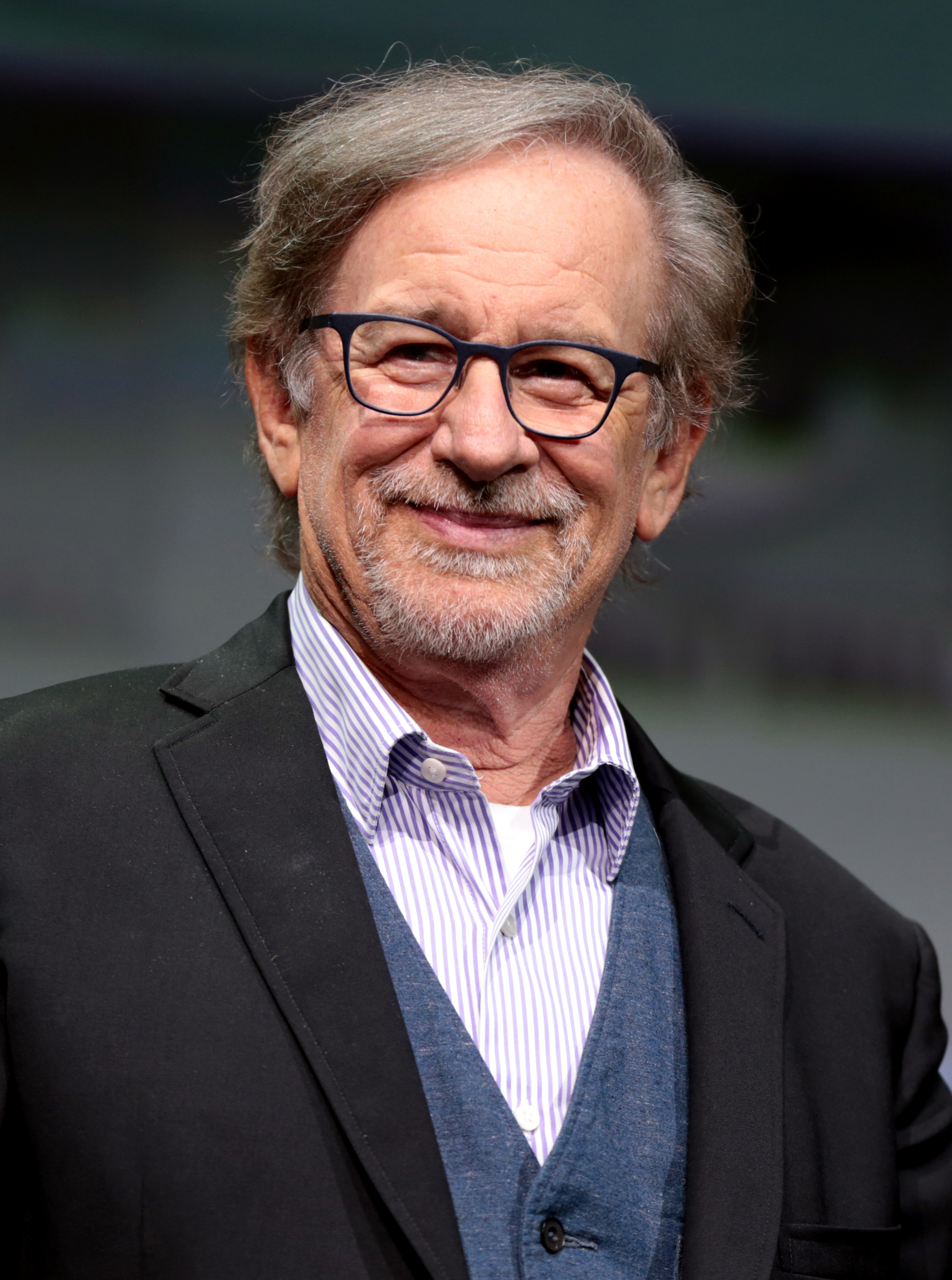
Steven Spielberg, Best Director winner

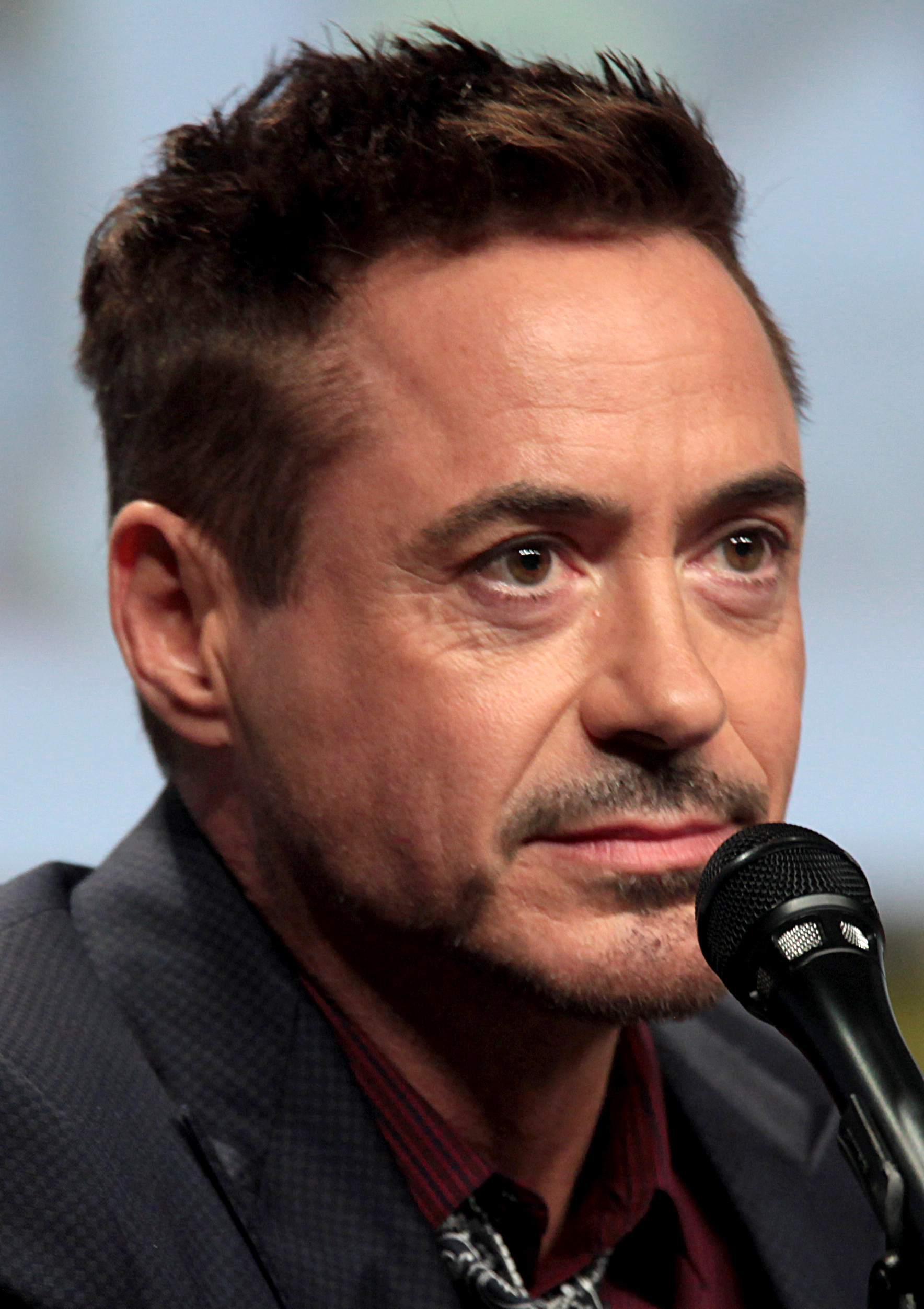
Robert Downey Jr., Best Actor winner

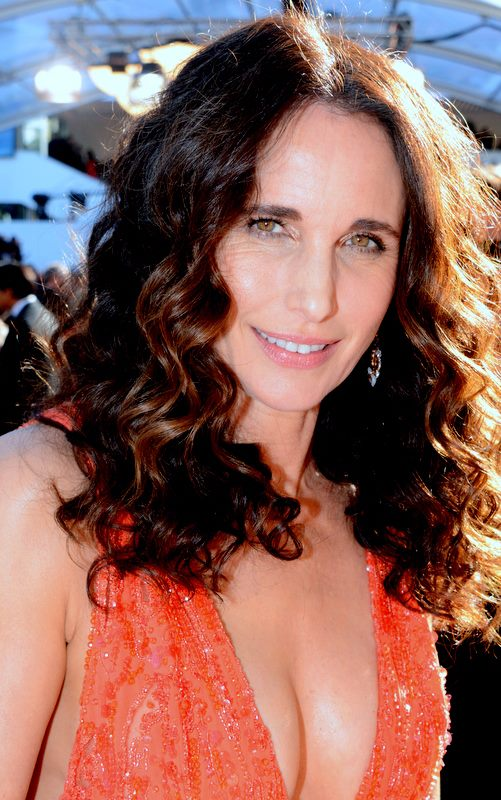
Andie MacDowell, Best Actress winner

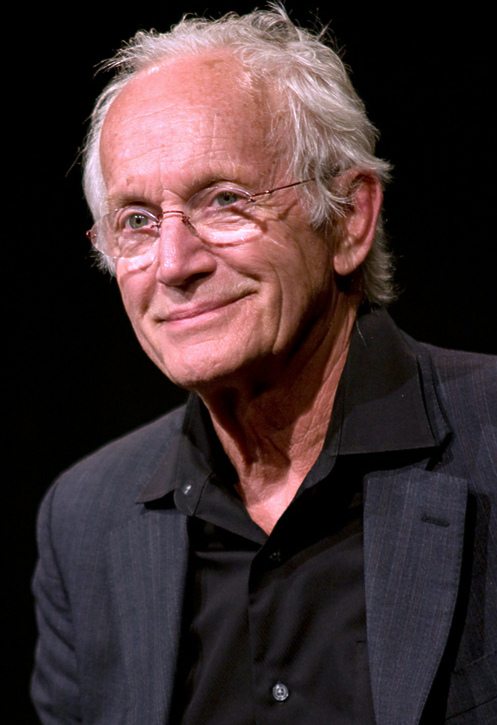
Lance Henriksen, Best Supporting Actor winner

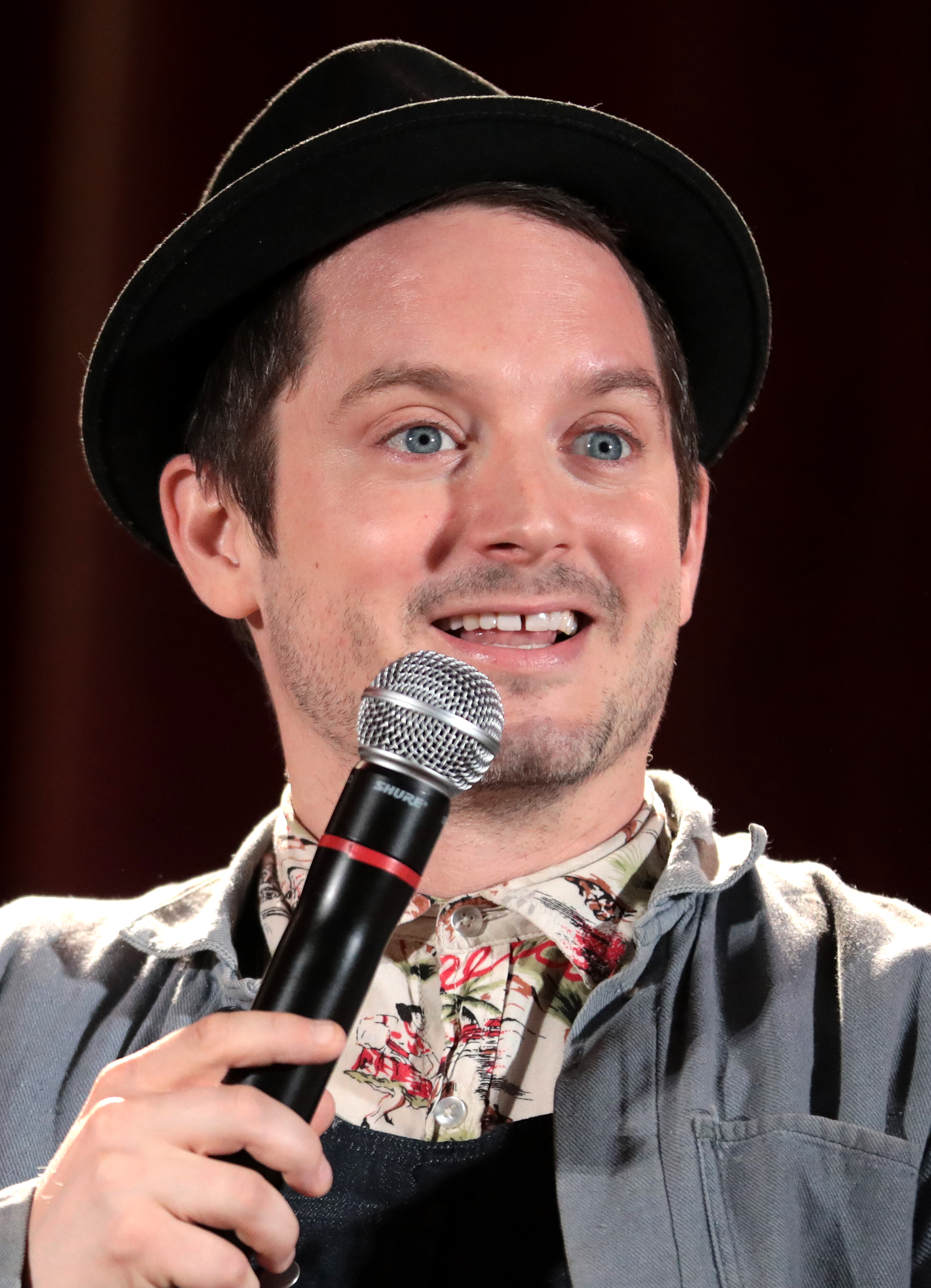
Elijah Wood, Best Performance by a Younger Actor winner

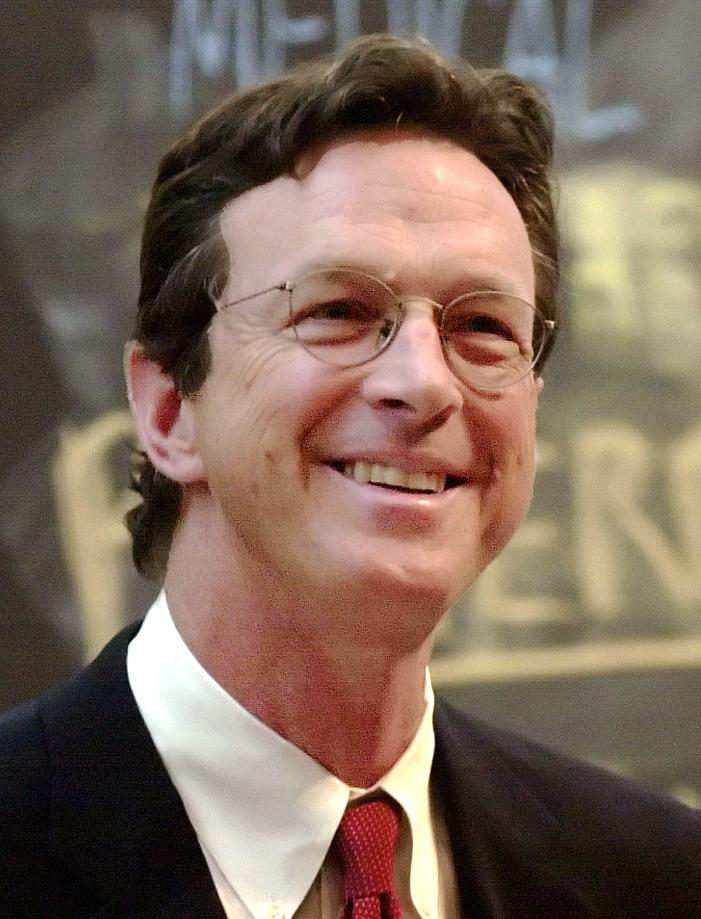
Michael Crichton, Best Writing co-winner

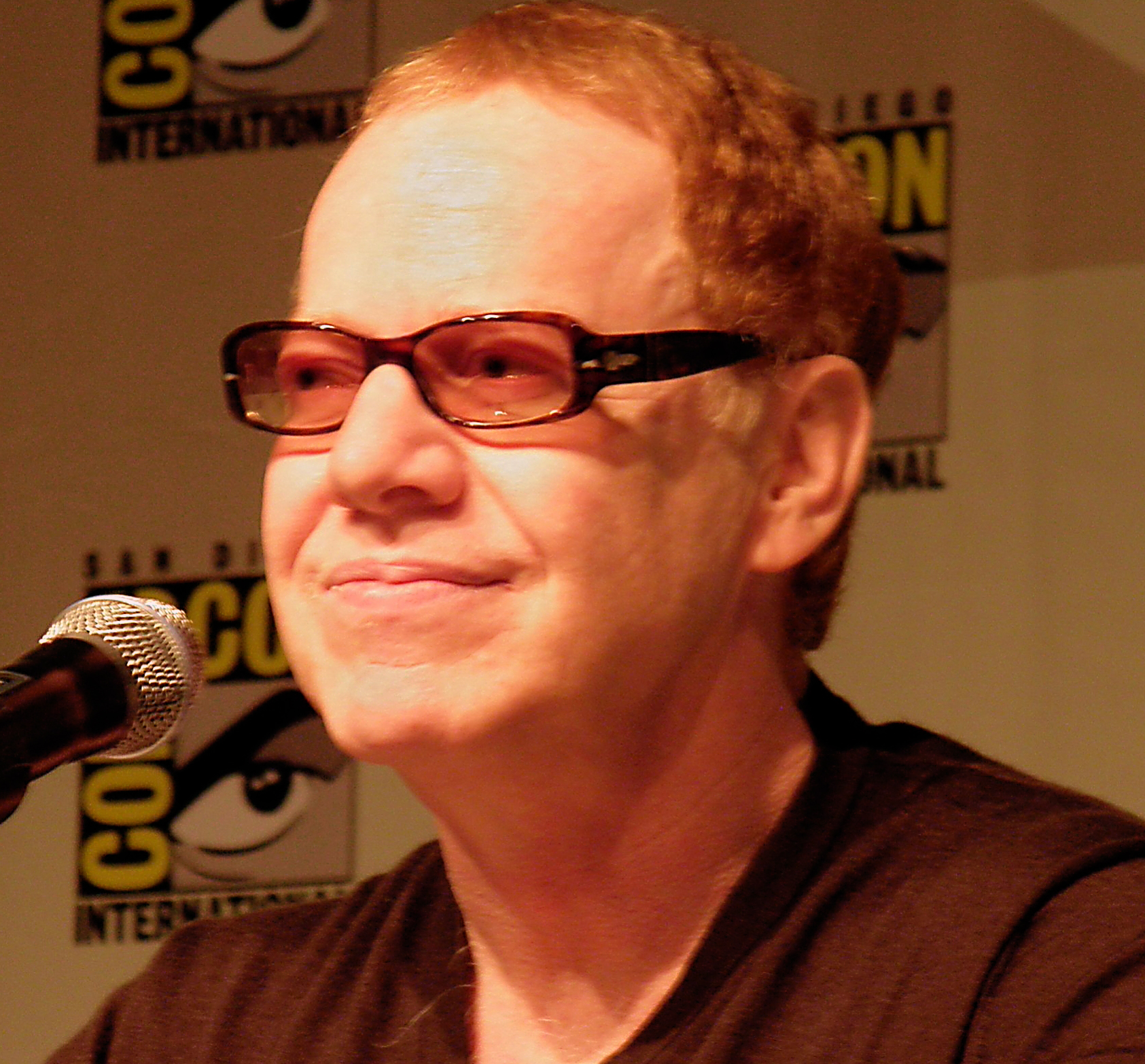
Danny Elfman, Best Music winner

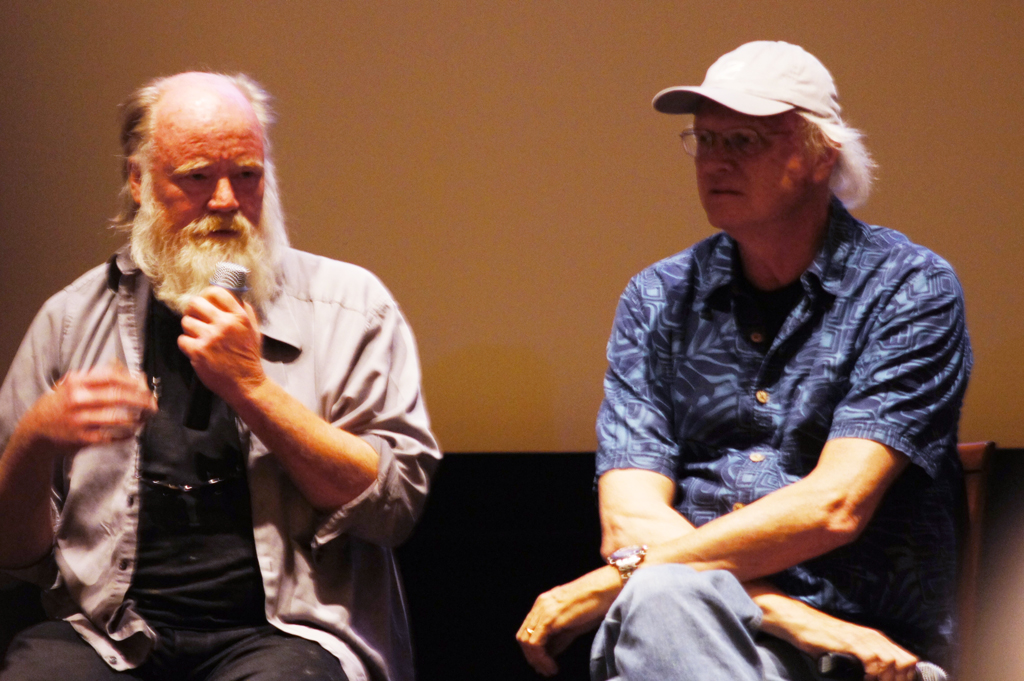
Phil Tippett (left) and Dennis Muren (right), Best Special Effects co-winners

Best Science Fiction Film	Best Fantasy Film
**Jurassic Park**; Demolition Man; Fire in the Sky; Fortress; Man's Best Friend; The Meteor Man; RoboCop 3	**The Nightmare Before Christmas**; Addams Family Values; Groundhog Day; Heart and Souls; Hocus Pocus; Last Action Hero; Rookie of the Year
Best Horror Film	Best Director
**Army of Darkness**; The Dark Half; The Good Son; Hard Target; Kalifornia; Needful Things; The Vanishing	**Steven Spielberg – Jurassic Park**; John McTiernan – Last Action Hero; Harold Ramis – Groundhog Day; George A. Romero – The Dark Half; Henry Selick – The Nightmare Before Christmas; Ron Underwood – Heart and Souls; John Woo – Hard Target
Best Actor	Best Actress
**Robert Downey Jr. – Heart and Souls as Thomas Reilly**; Jeff Bridges – The Vanishing as Barney Cousins; Bill Murray – Groundhog Day as Phil Connors; Robert Patrick – Fire in the Sky as Mike Rogers; Arnold Schwarzenegger – Last Action Hero as Jack Slater; Christian Slater – True Romance as Clarence Worley; Max von Sydow – Needful Things as Leland Gaunt	**Andie MacDowell – Groundhog Day as Rita Hanson**; Patricia Arquette – True Romance as Alabama Whitman; Laura Dern – Jurassic Park as Dr. Ellie Sattler; Michelle Forbes – Kalifornia as Carrie Laughlin; Anjelica Huston – Addams Family Values as Morticia Addams; Bette Midler – Hocus Pocus as Winifred "Winnie" Sanderson; Ally Sheedy – Man's Best Friend as Lori Tanner
Best Supporting Actor	Best Supporting Actress
**Lance Henriksen – Hard Target as Emil Fouchon**; Jeff Goldblum – Jurassic Park as Dr. Ian Malcolm; Charles Grodin – Heart and Souls as Harrison Winslow; Wayne Knight – Jurassic Park as Dennis Nedry; John Malkovich – In the Line of Fire as Mitch Leary; Tom Sizemore – Heart and Souls as Milo Peck; J. T. Walsh – Needful Things as Danforth "Buster" Keeton III	**Amanda Plummer – Needful Things as Nettie Cobb**; Nancy Allen – RoboCop 3 as Officer Anne Lewis; Joan Cusack – Addams Family Values as Debbie Jellinsky; Julie Harris – The Dark Half as Reggie Delesseps; Kathy Najimy – Hocus Pocus as Mary Sanderson; Sarah Jessica Parker – Hocus Pocus as Sarah Sanderson; Kyra Sedgwick – Heart and Souls as Julia; Alfre Woodard – Heart and Souls as Penny Washington
Best Performance by a Younger Actor	Best Writing
**Elijah Wood – The Good Son as Mark Evans**; Jesse Cameron-Glickenhaus – Slaughter of the Innocents as Jesse Broderick; Manuel Colao – Flight of the Innocent as Vito; Joseph Mazzello – Jurassic Park as Tim Murphy; Austin O'Brien – Last Action Hero as Danny Madigan; Christina Ricci – Addams Family Values as Wednesday Addams; Ariana Richards – Jurassic Park as Lex Murphy	**Michael Crichton and David Koepp – Jurassic Park**; Shane Black and David Arnott – Last Action Hero; Brent Maddock, S. S. Wilson, Gregory Hansen, and Erik Hansen – Heart and Souls; Tim Metcalfe – Kalifornia; Danny Rubin and Harold Ramis – Groundhog Day; Quentin Tarantino – True Romance; Tracy Tormé – Fire in the Sky
Best Music	Best Costumes
**Danny Elfman – The Nightmare Before Christmas**; Marc Shaiman – Addams Family Values; Mark Isham – Fire in the Sky; Graeme Revell – Hard Target; Marc Shaiman – Heart and Souls; John Williams – Jurassic Park; Christopher Young – The Vagrant	**Mary E. Vogt – Hocus Pocus**; Theoni V. Aldredge – Addams Family Values; Bob Ringwood – Demolition Man; Jennifer Butler – Groundhog Day; Sue Moore and Eric H. Sandberg – Jurassic Park; Gloria Gresham – Last Action Hero; Joseph A. Porro – Super Mario Bros.
Best Make-up	Best Special Effects
**Kevin Haney – Addams Family Values**; (Alterian, Inc., KNB EFX Group) – Army of Darkness; John Vulich and Everett Burrell – The Dark Half; Screaming Mad George and Steve Johnson (Alterian, Inc.) – Freaked; Kevin Yagher and Mitchell J. Coughlin – Man's Best Friend; Jeff Goodwin, Vincent J. Guastini, and Rob Burman – Super Mario Bros.; Bob Keen – Warlock: The Armageddon	**Dennis Muren, Stan Winston, Phil Tippett, and Michael Lantieri – Jurassic Park**; Michael J. McAlister and Kimberly Nelson LoCascio – Demolition Man; (Pacific Data Images (PDI), 4Ward Productions) – Heart and Souls; (Buena Vista Visual Effects, Matte World Digital, Rhythm & Hues) – Hocus Pocus; John E. Sullivan (Sony Pictures Imageworks, Boss Film Studios, Fantasy II Film Effects, Visual Concept Engineering (VCE), The Baer Animation Company, Inc.) – Last Action Hero; Ariel Velasco-Shaw, Eric Leighton, and Gordon Baker – The Nightmare Before Christmas; Richard Edlund – Solar Crisis

=== Television ===
Best Genre Television Series
- **Lois & Clark: The New Adventures of Superman (ABC)**
  - The Adventures of Brisco County, Jr. (Fox)
  - The Simpsons (Fox)
  - Star Trek: Deep Space Nine (Syndicated)
  - Star Trek: The Next Generation (Syndicated)
  - Wild Palms (ABC)
  - The X-Files (Fox)

=== Home video ===
Best Genre Video Release
- **Braindead**
  - The Ambulance
  - Blade Runner: The Director's Cut
  - El Mariachi
  - Man Bites Dog
  - Tomcat: Dangerous Desires
  - Warlock: The Armageddon

=== Special awards ===
George Pal Memorial Award

- Wah Chang
- Gene Warren
- Stan Winston

Life Career Award

- Whit Bissell
- Steve Reeves

Posthumous Award

- Alfred Hitchcock

President's Award

- Steven Spielberg

Service Award

- Mardi Rustam
