= Tremors: The Game =

- Developer(s): Rock Solid Studios
- Publisher(s): Conspiracy Entertainment
- Platform(s): Xbox, GameCube, PlayStation 2, Windows
- Release: Cancelled
- Genre(s): Survival horror
- Mode(s): Single-player

Tremors: The Game is a cancelled video game that was based on the Tremors franchise. The game was announced in August 2002 by Rock Solid Studios, who had been working on it since April/May 2002.

The game was going to be released for the Xbox, GameCube, PlayStation 2, and Microsoft Windows. Tremors was scheduled for release during the fall of 2003. However, the game was quietly canceled in the summer of that year.

== Gameplay ==
The video game was supposed to be a single-player, third-person, survival-horror action game. The player had to battle various types of Graboids (Graboids and Shriekers were confirmed) with ranged and melee weapons, while finding creative methods to avoid walking on the ground and hiding character's body heat signatures.

== Plot ==
It was announced that the game, while containing references to the films and the TV series, would have an independent story line taking place in the desert community of Golden Rock.
