= Stampede Entertainment =

American film production company

Stampede Entertainment is a film production company founded in the early 1990s by producer Nancy Roberts. The original Stampede team consisted of Roberts, screenwriters Brent Maddock and S.S. Wilson and director Ron Underwood.

The partners' previous work includes Short Circuit (1986), Batteries Not Included (1987), Short Circuit 2 (1988), The Land Before Time (1988), Tremors (1990), and City Slickers (1991). Stampede Entertainment's first production was Heart and Souls (1993), followed by Tremors 2: Aftershocks (1996), Tremors 3: Back to Perfection (2001), and Tremors 4: The Legend Begins (2004).

Stampede Entertainment also produced 13 episodes of Tremors the Series for the SciFi Channel in 2003.

Stampede Entertainment also published the online game Dirt Dragons in 2004, based on their film Tremors 4: the Legend Begins.

In 2014, 10 years after Tremors 4's release, Universal Studios re-launched the franchise with a sequel, Tremors 5: Bloodlines. Although Stampede Entertainment expressed interest in working on the project (which was very loosely based on their previous script pitch for a fifth film which was to be set in Australia), they were offered no effective creative control over the film's story or direction, and thus declined to be credited as Executive Producers. In April 2025, it was announced that Stampede Entertainment had won the rights to the franchise back and are planning a sequel to "Back to Perfection" with hopes of getting Kevin Bacon to return as Val.

Additionally, a second Tremors television series was put into development by Blumhouse Productions without Stampede Entertainment's involvement, although the pilot was not accepted by the network.
