= Tucker's Monster =

2010 novel by S. S. Wilson

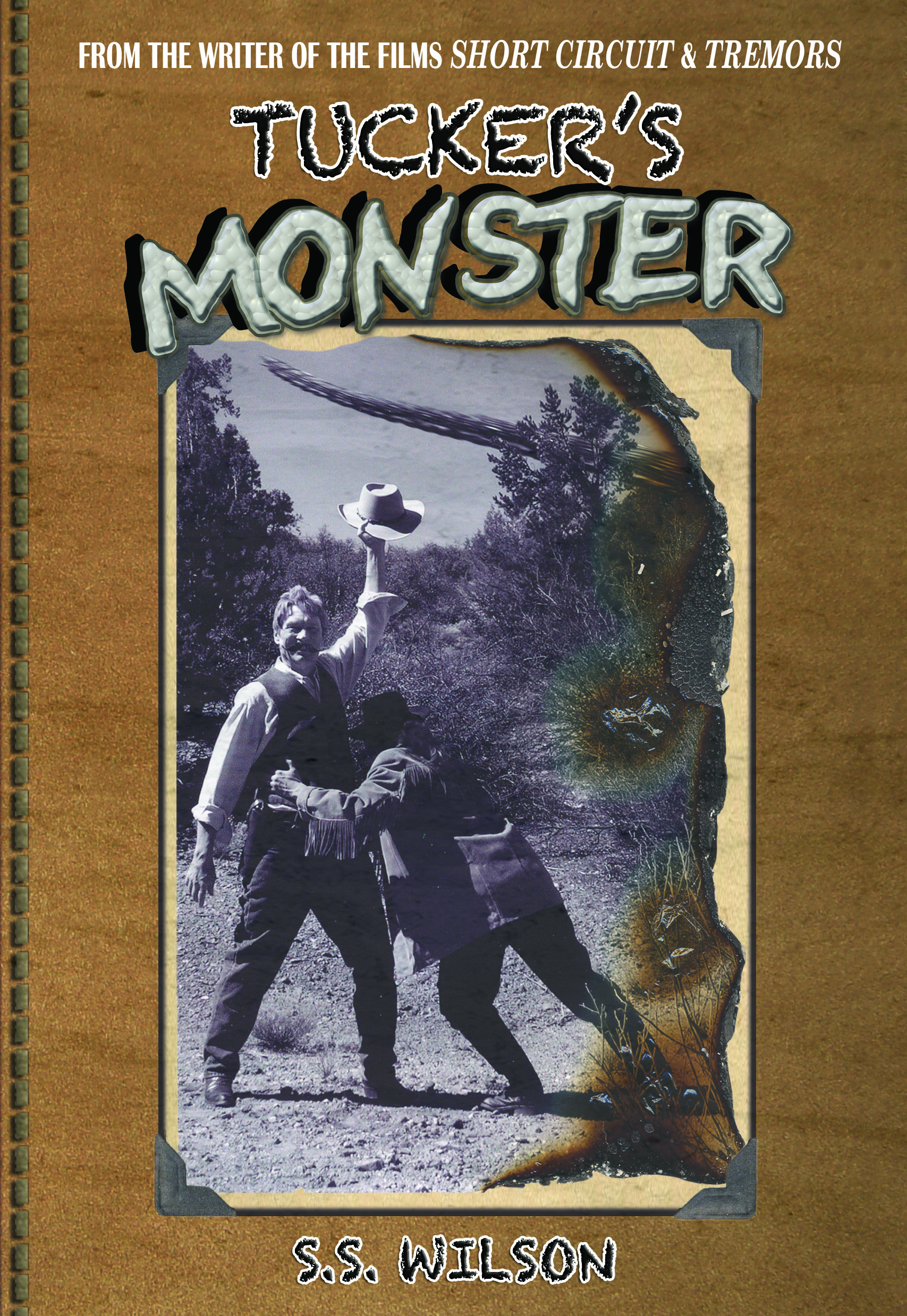
- Author: S. S. Wilson
- Cover artist: Michelle Deal
- Language: English
- Genre: Fiction, fantasy
- Set in: 1903
- Published: July 22, 2010
- Publisher: Real Deal Productions Inc.
- Publication date: July 22, 2010
- Publication place: United States
- Pages: 281
- Awards: Best First Book – Fiction category of the USA Best Books Awards 2011
- ISBN: 978-0982722213

Tucker’s Monster is the first novel written by Hollywood screenwriter, producer and director S. S. Wilson.

The book was independently published in 2010 by Real Deal Productions Inc. and was the winner of the 2011 USA Best Book Awards in the category of Best New Fiction. S. S. Wilson is best known for writing the film Short Circuit and as a writer, producer and director in the Tremors film and television series.

== Plot ==
Set in 1903, Tucker’s Monster chronicles the adventures of Oklahoma Rancher Harold B. Tucker as he follows his passion of researching mythical and legendary creatures.
