= Tremors (TV series) =

2003 American monster horror comedy television series

- Title Card
- Created by: S. S. Wilson; Brent Maddock; Ron Underwood
- Based on: Tremors by: Brent Maddock; S. S. Wilson
- Developed by: S. S. Wilson; Brent Maddock; Nancy Roberts
- Written by: Christopher Silber (staff writer)
- Starring: Victor Browne; Gladise Jimenez; Marcia Strassman; Lela Lee; Dean Norris; Michael Gross
- Composer: Steve Dorff
- Country of origin: United States
- Original language: English
- No. of seasons: 1
- No. of episodes: 13

Production
- Executive producers: Nancy Roberts; S. S. Wilson; Brent Maddock; David Israel
- Producer: Michael Gross
- Production location: Fox Studios Baja, Rosarito México
- Cinematography: Steven Shaw
- Running time: 45 minutes
- Production companies: Big Productions, Inc. Stampede Entertainment; USA Cable Entertainment; Universal Network Television

Original release
- Network: Sci-Fi Channel
- Release: March 28 – August 8, 2003

Related
- Tremors 3: Back to Perfection (2001); Tremors 4: The Legend Begins (2004)

Tremors is an American monster horror television series created by S. S. Wilson, Brent Maddock, and Ron Underwood and based on the Tremors franchise. It serves as a sequel to Tremors 3: Back to Perfection. Originally airing with its episodes out of order on the Sci-Fi Channel, it was later aired in its proper sequence on the G4 Network.

== Plot ==
The story for the TV series picks up from where Tremors 3: Back to Perfection left off. It follows the residents of Perfection Valley attempting to co-exist with an albino Graboid (El Blanco) while dealing with problems caused by failed government experiments, mad scientists, or ruthless real-estate developers. When initially aired by Syfy, the episodes were shown out of order, with Episode 1 ("Feeding Frenzy") and Episode 6 ("Ghost Dance") shown on the premiere night. The second episode produced, "Shriek and Destroy", was the final episode shown. This out-of-order airing required the re-editing of various episodes. Changes included a new opening sequence for Episode 5 ("Project 4-12"), which aired as the eighth episode. This episode also introduced the character Cletus Poffenburger (played by Christopher Lloyd). The re-edited episode explained Cletus' appearance in a flashback sequence, occurring prior to Episode 6, "Ghost Dance", which had actually aired as the second in the series.

== Cast ==
Cast	Actor/Actress	Character	Episode(s)
Main	Victor Browne	Tyler Reed	
Main	Gladise Jimenez	Rosalita Sanchez	
Main	Marcia Strassman	Nancy Sterngood	
Main	Lela Lee	Jodi Chang	
Main	Dean Norris	W. D. Twitchell	
Main	Michael Gross	Burt Gummer	
Recurring	J. D. Walsh	Larry Norvel	“Flora or Fauna”, “Project 4-12”, “The Sounds of Silence”, “The Key”
Recurring	Christopher Lloyd	Dr. Cletus Poffenberger	“Ghost Dance”, “Flora or Fauna?”, “Project 4-12”
Recurring	Sarah Rafferty	Dr. Casey Matthews	“Flora or Fauna?”, “Graboid Rights”, “Water Hazard”
Recurring	Branscombe Richmond	Harlowe Winnemucca	“Feeding Frenzy”, “Ghost Dance”, “Project 4-12”
Recurring	Robert Jayne	Melvin Plug	“Feeding Frenzy”, “Water Hazard”
Recurring	Nicholas Turturro	Frank	“Hit and Run”, “The Key”
Recurring	Richard Biggs	Roger Garrett	“Flora or Fauna”, “Water Hazard”
Guest	Michael Harney	Gene Fallon	“Ghost Dance”
Guest	Jamie McShane	Charlie Wilhelm	“Ghost Dance”
Guest	Melinda Clarke	Dr. Megan Flint	“Night of the Shriekers”
Guest	Matt Malloy	Dr. Harold Baines	“Night of the Shriekers”
Guest	Patrick St. Esprit	Karl Hartung	“Night of the Shriekers”
Guest	Harrison Page	Mead	“Blast from the Past”
Guest	Stuart Fratkin	Rosser	“Blast from the Past”
Guest	David Doty	Mosely	“Blast from the Past”
Guest	Michael Rooker	Kinney	“Hit and Run”
Guest	Troy Winbush	Max	“Hit and Run”
Guest	Joel McKinnon Miller	Red Landers	“A Little Paranoia Among Friends”
Guest	Audrey Wasilewski	Rosie Landers	“A Little Paranoia Among Friends”
Guest	Armin Shimerman	Cecil Carr	“A Little Paranoia Among Friends”
Guest	Tinsley Grimes	Mindy Sterngood	“Graboid Rights”
Guest	Jeffrey Johnson	Chad Ranston	“Graboid Rights”
Guest	Rebecca McFarland	Dr. Ellie Bergen	“Graboid Rights”
Guest	Joan McMurtrey	Dr. Donna Debevic	“The Sounds of Silence”
Guest	Vivica A. Fox	Delores	“The Key”
Guest	Richard Riehle	Helmut Krause	“The Key”
Guest	Jim Beaver	Sheriff Sam Boggs	“Water Hazard”
Guest	Don Swayze	Orville James	“Water Hazard”
Guest	Pat Skipper	Bill McClane	“Shriek and Destroy”
Guest	William O’Leary	George Meadows	“Shriek and Destroy”

== Episodes ==
Episodes are listed in the order they were originally broadcast. However, the Sci-Fi Channel did not like the episode "Shriek and Destroy" and aired "Ghost Dance" in its place. Various other episodes are also aired out of order.

Episode Number	Original Order	Title	Directed By	Teleplay By	Story By	Airdate	Runtime
1	1	“Feeding Frenzy”	Bradford May	S. S. Wilson, Brent Maddock & Nancy Roberts		March 28, 2003	45 mins
Tyler Reed, the new owner of Desert Jack's Graboid Adventure, arrives in Perfection and must help Burt Gummer determine why El Blanco is eating far more than he should. Meanwhile, Melvin Plug is trying once again to buy out Perfection, this time to erect a strip-mall called "Melville." Twitchell nearly forces Burt to kill El Blanco, but Burt spots a weird glinting light and shoots that instead, destroying the device that is driving El Blanco insane with hunger. The goon Melvin hired to do this demands payment after barely evading Burt and summons El Blanco when Melvin refuses, but is eaten by El Blanco before he can do anything else. Melvin is discovered by Burt, who scolds him, despite Melvin maintaining his innocence. Back in town, everyone accepts Tyler as part of the Perfection family.
2	6	“Ghost Dance”	Whitney Ransick	S. S. Wilson & Brent Maddock		March 28, 2003	44 mins
A green cloud appears in an abandoned silver mine. After miners are found to be severely dehydrated, Burt, Twitchell and Tyler investigate the mine to discover the gas themselves. The gas is actually a hydrophilic bacteria that was the project of a nearby laboratory. After being boarded up, the lab came into contact with Mixmaster, a compound that blends non-human DNA designed to create living weapons for the government. Knowing that it will be drawn to the town for moisture, they decide to trap it in a special container using a makeshift vacuum cleaner built by Tyler and scientist Cletus, who worked in the lab. The National Guard was sent to evacuate all the townsfolk before a strike from a napalm bombing occurs. Jodi and Rosalita stall them by summoning El Blanco and using him to block the road. Thanks to a distraction by Nancy and Cletus, the men finish the device and Tyler sucks the creature in. They then have Twitchell send it away for proper government storage. However, the cloud spread Mixmaster while traversing through the area. Soon, the wildlife and plant life will mutate into new creatures.
3	7	“Night of the Shriekers”	P. J. Pesce	John Schulian, Brent Maddock, & S. S. Wilson	John Schulian	April 4, 2003	44 mins
A government team in Perfection is training shriekers for rescue missions. But a storm shorts out the devices controlling them, and the shriekers run rampant, killing most of the team. The three shriekers multiply and each original shrieker leads its own group. The Perfectionites prepare to hunt down the shriekers before they can multiply or leave the valley, but are resisted by the project's lead scientist, who wishes to recapture them instead. Knowing better, the locals lure the creatures into a trap at Burt's home and start killing them. The scientist, however, destroys Burt's ammo to stop them. This forces Nancy, Twitchell and Jodi to flee to the safe room, but end up stuck there thanks to a bullet wedged in the hinge. The scientist flees to her truck and tries to coax one of the shriekers into it; however, its control collar is off, causing it to kill her and the driver. The last group tries to sneak up Burt's escape tunnel after trying to dig down into the bunker. Nancy throws a bomb into the tunnel, killing the last of the shriekers.
4	3	“Blast from the Past”	Michael Shapiro	Babs Greyhosky	S. S. Wilson, Brent Maddock & Babs Greyhosky	April 11, 2003	42 mins
Things start going screwy when Tyler finds a foot near the side of the road and a hang-glider. Later, Burt and Tyler discover a delivery truck and the remains of the man who was supposed to be delivering Nancy's new kiln. With these attacks, Burt deduces that an ass-blaster is on the loose. However, before he and Tyler can go to work and kill the thing, two people from Vegas arrive. They reveal themselves to be hired hands for Sigmund and Ray, the magicians to whom Nancy sold the ass-blaster to in Tremors 3: Back to Perfection, to recover their ass-blaster, Messerschmitt, after poachers failed to kidnap it. However, they severely screw up their first attempt to capture the ass-blaster and one of the hired hands nearly dies. Realizing it is now too smart to be fooled by a ground trap, Burt decides to use a hang-glider to launch a snack for Messerschmitt. They end up successful and tie up Messerschmitt. Burt hands it over to Sigmund and Ray's hired hands to be returned to Vegas.
5	9	“Flora or Fauna?”	Chuck Bowman	Brent Maddock & S. S. Wilson		April 18, 2003	43 mins
An over-eager tourist named Larry Norvel wants to see El Blanco (even going as far as to rent out an entire trip for himself), but is met with disappointment. Meanwhile, the Perfectionites discover a strange, plant-animal hybrid created by Mixmaster, as well as a government team sent to study Mixmaster's effects on the valley. However, some of the team are killed by the highly powerful "stomach acid" of the hybrid, leaving their skeletons behind. At the end of the episode Larry asks Cletus about time travel experiments, a nod to Christopher Lloyd's previous role as Doc Brown of Back to the Future fame and they seem to get along well while talking about the concept. The Mixmaster plant is finally killed by Tyler using poison just before it can spread seeds, but one seed survives in Larry's car. However, when it falls to the ground, it is squashed underfoot by Burt, destroying the mutant plant for good.
6	4	“Hit and Run”	P.J. Pesce	Christopher Silber		April 25, 2003	44 mins
A Las Vegas mobster brings his disbelieving friend, Frank, to Perfection to see El Blanco in person. However, this backfires on him when he goes too far in trying to bring El Blanco out and ends up being eaten alive. To make matters worse, he held the key to a bank vault his mob was planning to rob. Frank vows revenge on El Blanco and to retrieve the key after calling in backup from a sinister member of the mob (Michael Rooker). However, things backfire yet again for the third mobster when El Blanco accidentally launches a harpoon through him due to Burt interfering with them. Frank vows to get the key back and tries again to kill El Blanco, but he is driven away by Burt. However, Frank is stuck to a rope El Blanco swallowed and is being dragged along as his punishment. Burt and Tyler later find evidence that he escaped, though.
7	8	“A Little Paranoia Among Friends”	Michael Grossman	Babs Greyhosky		April 11, 2003	42 mins
Over the last six months, people in Toluca, New Mexico, led by radio personality Cecil Car, have believed that aliens are responsible for the disappearances. However, it is actually a graboid eating people. Knowing better than the townsfolk, Twitchell sends Burt and Tyler to investigate. However, the townspeople think a conspiracy is going on and Burt was sent as a government plant to cover it up. The townsfolk even disable the seismographs Burt sets up to track the graboid, believing them to be government devices to repel aliens. Ultimately, Tyler invents a story that the graboid is an alien and eventually kills it with Burt's M82A2. The townsfolk accept them as heroes while still believing that Burt is a government agent.
8	5	“Project 4-12”	Chuck Bowman	John Schulian		June 27, 2003	44 mins
The story of the Perfectionites' first meeting with Cletus Poffenberger. When Project 4-12 escapes and runs wild in the valley, Cletus, Burt and Tyler hunt down the beast. In the meantime, Cletus reveals that 4-12 was a creature he created using Mixmaster and that his violent outbursts were from a lack of a certain chemical he could no longer find due to the violent natures of the animals 4-12 was made of. After a long hunt, Burt is forced to kill 4–12 with a homemade flamethrower, much to Cletus' sadness. 4-12 is given a proper burial by the townsfolk, hoping to cheer Cletus up a bit, allowing him to join the town's population.
9	10	“Graboid Rights”	P.J. Pesce	Christopher Silber		July 11, 2003	43 mins
Animal rights activists (including Nancy's college dropout daughter Mindy) arrive in Perfection to force the townspeople to leave, thinking they are harming El Blanco by being there. Meanwhile, El Blanco starts going mad for some unknown reason, even going to territories it normally avoids. It is ultimately revealed that one of the activists was poisoning El Blanco to prove her story for the head of the activists, but El Blanco accidentally swallows a fatal dose when he eats the lackey who had been leaving the poison out and beaches himself in town to die. Burt and the doctor manage to create an antidote and El Blanco is saved by Mindy, who tosses it into his mouth with her softball skills. With El Blanco saved, the activists leave town and Mindy is returned to college after dumping the activist leader, whom Twitchell has arrested for all the acts of vandalism and sabotage he had committed.
10	12	“The Sounds of Silence”	Michael Shapiro	Babs Greyhosky		July 18, 2003	43 mins
Mixmaster has created a deadly swarm of mutated insects that infest the valley and kill a herd of horses and two construction workers. Making matters worse, El Blanco is both driven away and kept away by the high pitched sound the swarm of bugs make to disorient their prey before devouring it. Being extra sensitive to high frequency sounds, El Blanco heads toward the base of the mountains to stay alive. Meanwhile, since Burt is out of town, Tyler must work with a woman who seems to have a lot in common with the survivalist, even though she claims they would dislike each other in person. Also, Larry is back, apparently to stay. Working together, the three trap the bugs in road tar using termite mating calls and kill them by lighting them on fire with gasoline. As a said nuisance, the townsfolk have to put up with Larry, who has decided to move to Perfection as it suits his taste in weirdness. After Larry helps kill the bugs, Nancy allows him to stay in Mindy's old room for a while, but plans to kick him out when he cannot find and/or build a place of his own.
11	13	“The Key”	P.J. Pesce	John Schulian, Christopher Silber & Brent Maddock	John Schulian, Christopher Silber, Brent Maddock & S.S. Wilson	July 25, 2003	44 mins
Frank the mobster returns to Perfection to continue his quest to kill El Blanco and retrieve the key he swallowed, along with Delores, Max's old wife (and now his girlfriend) and an inventor Delores is tricking into helping them with a sonic weapon to stun El Blanco. Meanwhile, Larry encounters a strange creature in a barn and calls it an "Invisibat" as it exists, but cannot be seen. In the final battle, Delores is driven to El Blanco by Larry and the Invisbat and is eaten alive, while Frank runs away. He gets picked up by a mobster and is brought to Chicago to be killed for his incompetence in failing a simple mission. Meanwhile, Larry finds the key in graboid dung and puts it in a collection of metal detector findings, unaware of its true value.
12	11	“Water Hazard”	Chuck Bowman	Nancy Roberts		August 1, 2003	44 mins
Melvin opens Oasis, a golf course near Bixby, but its lagoons are filled with water stolen from Perfection Valley's water table and are contaminated with Mixmaster, which create a giant prehistoric type brine-shrimp that kills three people. In desperate need of money, Tyler and Rosalita take a job at the golf course and end up investigating the creature. Tyler is blamed for the deaths of two officers and spends the night in jail. There, he encounters the driver who stole the water, who reveals where he got it. Burt gets the sheriff, an old friend of his, to let Tyler go, but is furious that Tyler tried to take care of the situation without him. Tyler ends up having to deal with it himself while Burt is gone and lays a trap with Rosalita and Twitchell's help in the river and kills the monster with dry ice. Twitchell helps by driving his car into the river to create a barrier against the shrimp. Afterwards, Rosalita yells at Tyler and Burt, reminding them that they are partners and have not been acting as such. The two men make up and Burt, who has earned a lot of money from a lecture he just gave, refuses half the reward money, saying that Tyler earned it. The two then remind Rosalita that only the three of them know the truth about where Melvin's Mixmaster contaminated water came from and he would be desperate to cover that up. Rosalita uses this to blackmail Melvin for thousands of dollars.
13	2	“Shriek and Destroy”	Jack Sholder	Brent Maddock & S. S. Wilson		August 8, 2003	39 mins
Burt and Tyler are contracted by Twitchell to go to Juniper, Arizona and eradicate a herd of shriekers that has appeared. Meanwhile, the Fish and Wildlife Service send their top agent in. The operative dismisses Burt and Tyler from their job and heads to take out the remaining shriekers. After killing five of them, the operative takes the sole surviving shrieker to a grain mill to be guarded until armed transport arrives to take it for study. At the town's Pioneer Day festival, the operative informs Twitchell of his success. Burt and Tyler become enraged when they learn what he did. After scolding the operative, Burt heads to the mill, where the agent is eaten by the now-army of shriekers before escaping into a pipe that leads to the fair. Burt and Tyler run out of bullets and visit a house with a "famous" gun collection, but it turns out to be Civil War muskets. When the local baseball team shows up, Burt organizes them into a firing squad that kills all the shriekers. Burt returns to Perfection, where Nancy names the recording of their adventure "Shriek and Destroy" and Tyler is grilled by Jodi and Rosalita for being distracted by Ms. Juniper while recording and then being punched by her boyfriend.

The original intended order of the episodes is the following; this is also the order of the episodes on the DVD set:

1. “Feeding Frenzy”
2. “Shriek and Destroy”
3. “Blast from the Past”
4. “Hit and Run”
5. “Project 4-12”*
6. “Ghost Dance”*
7. “Night of the Shriekers”
8. “A Little Paranoia Among Friends”
9. “Flora or Fauna?”*
10. “Graboid Rights”
11. “Water Hazard”*
12. “The Sounds of Silence”*
13. “The Key”*

*Episodes containing a Mixmaster subplot

== Production ==
Tremors: The Series was produced at the same time as Tremors 4: The Legend Begins. The show was mistakenly believed to be a replacement for the canceled Farscape, which led to a massive uproar from Farscape's fan base, despite the fact that production for Tremors had begun several months prior to the cancellation of Farscape.

Brent Maddock and S.S. Wilson had penned up a Tremors-based TV show as far back as 1993, under the titles Val & Earl: Monster Hunters, Tremors: The Lost Monsters, and Tremors: The Adventures of Val & Earl. Many plot and monster ideas from this failed television series would be recycled for Tremors: The Series, such as a giant shrimp, flesh-eating insects, and shriekers attacking an amusement park. Production took place at Fox Studios Baja Peninsula facilities and on locations in nearby Rosarito, Mexico.

The pilot episode premiered on March 28, 2003, and broke records for the Sci-Fi Channel, becoming the network's highest-rated debut episode for a new series, and becoming one of the most-watched events in the history of the channel. While the show would continue to perform well, the number of views per episode drastically declined over the ensuing months, failing to hit Farscape's projected prime time air slot demographic numbers and was eventually deemed too expensive to continue. Tremors was canceled after one half-season of 13 episodes.

After a review, comparing the episode numbers and episode names using the series purchased on iTunes and cross-referencing it with the episode information listed in Amazon Prime video, it seems that both locations have matching incorrect information in that the episodes are numbered in order that they were broadcast (not correct chronological order for continuity). It also appears that the series is no longer available for purchase/download from iTunes or Amazon Prime video as of 11 April 2021.

== Home video release ==
Half of the show was made available on iTunes in September 2008 but many episodes were still missing. It was later made fully available on Hulu and through Amazon.com's Unbox video download service in November 2009, with several episodes finally becoming widely seen for the first time since their original airings six years prior.

On March 9, 2010, Universal Studios Home Entertainment finally released the complete series on a three-disc DVD set. The set contains all 13 episodes in their original production order and no bonus features. The set also contains the re-edited version of the episode “Project 4-12” with the alternate beginning and ending scenes.

== Cancelled revival ==
In 2017, Syfy announced that it had ordered a pilot episode for a new television series in the franchise. Kevin Bacon was hired to reprise his role from the first film. Vincenzo Natali was set to direct the pilot. The following year in April, Bacon said via his Instagram account that "the network has decided not to move forward".
