= Short Circuit (video game) =

1987 video game

- Developer: Ocean Software
- Publisher: Ocean Software
- Platforms: Amstrad CPC; Commodore 64; ZX Spectrum
- Release: EU: 1987
- Mode: Single-player

Short Circuit is a video game based on the 1986 film of the same name. It was developed and published by British company Ocean Software, and was released in Europe in 1987, for Amstrad CPC, Commodore 64 (C64), and ZX Spectrum. It was published again in 1989 as a budget re-release.

== Gameplay ==
Short Circuit is based on the film of the same name, in which a weaponized robot, Number 5, is struck by lightning and gains human emotion. The president of Number 5's manufacturing company - NOVA Robotics wants to capture him before he can do any harm to the public, and the scientist who built Number 5 wants to disassemble him and discover how he gained emotion. Meanwhile, a security chief wants to destroy Number 5.

Short Circuit consists of two gameplay modes, both in which the player takes control of Number 5. In the first portion, Number 5 must wander through numerous rooms in the robotics facility and try to escape. From computers, the player downloads software that allows Number 5 to jump, shoot a laser to stun guards, and search for items that must be used to escape. The player must also locate instructions for how to build a decoy robot later in the game.

The second portion is a side-scrolling game in which Number 5 must evade security guards and other robots while running through country land. Animals are encountered on Number 5's path, and he must avoid running into them. Otherwise, he feels remorse for harming the wildlife and will eventually shut himself down if it occurs often enough. Likewise, the player must be careful not to kill the guards with Number 5's laser. The player wins the game by reaching a van and building the decoy robot.

== Reception ==
Reception

Review scores
Publication	Score
Crash	71% (ZX Spectrum)
Computer and Video Games	62% (CPC/C64 re-release); 64% (ZX Spectrum re-release)
Sinclair User	5/5 (ZX Spectrum)
Your Sinclair	8/10 (ZX Spectrum)
Zzap!64	49% (C64)
The Australian Commodore Review	94/100 (C64)
Commodore User	8/10 (C64)
Computer Gamer	74% (ZX Spectrum)
CU Amiga-64	82% (C64 re-release)
Datormagazin	4/5 (C64)
Happy Computer	70/100 (C64)

Short Circuit was praised for its graphics, and its music and sound. J. Mark Hunter of The Australian Commodore Review stated that the Number 5 character "is identical to the movie representation and moves exactly the same way", while writing that the music "harmonizes perfectly with the excellent movability of the robot along a very fine graphic scroll-scape". Hunter concluded that the game was "definitely a pleasurable investment, and one that you won't get sick of for a long, long time". Lee Brathwaite of Computer and Video Games (CVG) wrote that the Number 5 character "has been captured in every detail", while the background graphics "are good and suit the game well".

Reviewers for Zzap!64 found it to be a repetitive and average film-based game, while Jim Douglas of Sinclair User called it a "very worthwhile purchase". Douglas praised the gameplay and its variety, but preferred the second stage, calling the first one difficult. Gwyn Hughes of Your Sinclair was disappointed with the second stage, calling it "a shallow let down after that superb first part". Paul Boughton, also writing for CVG, praised the gameplay and considered it clever.

CVG reviewed the game's re-release in 1989. The magazine called the first stage "reasonably addictive" but commented that the second stage "is much too difficult, requiring absolutely precise timing to avoid the many animals which get in your way". CVG stated that the ZX Spectrum version offered crisper graphics than the Amstrad CPC version.
