= Tony Genaro =

American actor

- Born: October 15, 1941; Gallup, New Mexico, U.S.
- Died: May 7, 2014 (aged 72); Hollywood, California, U.S.

Anthony Genaro Acosta (October 15, 1941 – May 7, 2014) was an American film, television and stage actor. He was perhaps best known to audiences for his role as Miguel in the 1990 film, Tremors.

Genaro was born in Gallup, New Mexico. He enlisted in the United States Army at the age of 14 by lying about his age. He joined the San Diego Theater Company after leaving the Army, often appearing on stage opposite actor Carl Weathers. He died at his home in Hollywood, California on May 7, 2014, aged 72.

== Filmography ==
Year	Title	Role	Notes
1972	Bunny O'Hare	Collector #2	
1972	Wacky Taxi	The Friends: Tony	
1987	La Bamba	Mr. Caballero	
1988	The Milagro Beanfield War	Nick Rael	
1990	Tremors	Miguel	
1991	Switch	Mental Patient	
1991	Ted & Venus	Bailiff	
1992	The Waterdance	Victor	
1992	Final Analysis	Hector	
1992	Equinox	Eddie Gutierrez	
1993	Heart and Souls	Man at Farmhouse	
1994	Speechless	Truck Driver	
1995	Scorpion Spring	Arturo	
1995	Lone Justice 2		
1996	The Craft	Bus Driver	
1996	Phenomenon	Tito	
1996	The Big Squeeze	Older Man	
1998	The Mask of Zorro	Watering Station Owner	
1998	Mighty Joe Young	Boxer Shorts Man	
2000	Price of Glory	Malave	
2000	Auggie Rose	Romeo	
2001	Double Take	Gov. Quintana	
2001	Tremors 3: Back to Perfection	Miguel	
2001	My Father's Camera	Grandpa	
2003	Anger Management	Cabbie	
2005	Sueño	Barber #2	
2005	Pissed	Mr. Chavez	
2006	World Trade Center	Will's Father	
2009	Blue	Pappi	
2009	The Soloist	Globe Lobby Guard	
2010	Boyle Heights	Louie Flores	
2011	Coming & Going	Pedro	
