= Tremors 3: Back to Perfection =

2001 film by Brent Maddock

- Promotional release poster
- Directed by: Brent Maddock
- Screenplay by: John Whelpley
- Story by: S. S. Wilson; Brent Maddock; Nancy Roberts
- Produced by: Nancy Roberts
- Starring: Michael Gross; Shawn Christian; Susan Chuang; Charlotte Stewart; Ariana Richards
- Cinematography: Virgil Harper
- Edited by: Drake Silliman
- Music by: Kevin Kiner
- Production company: Stampede Entertainment
- Distributed by: Universal Home Entertainment
- Release date: October 1, 2001
- Running time: 99 minutes
- Country: United States
- Language: English

Tremors 3: Back to Perfection is a 2001 direct-to-video horror monster film directed by Brent Maddock, and is the third installment in the Tremors series featuring the subterranean worm-creatures dubbed "Graboids". It is a sequel to Tremors 2: Aftershocks. Michael Gross, Charlotte Stewart, Ariana Richards, Tony Genaro, and Robert Jayne reprise their roles from the first film. It is followed by Tremors 4: The Legend Begins.

== Plot ==
Adventurer Burt Gummer returns to his hometown of Perfection, Nevada, after a hunt for Shriekers in El Chaco, Argentina. Since the original Graboid attacks, the town's preventive equipment for tracking Graboid activities has fallen into disrepair due to the neglect of native residents Miguel, Nancy Sterngood, and her daughter Mindy. Walter Chang's market has been taken over by his niece Jodi, and the town has gained a new resident, Jack, who creates mock-attack tours for visiting tourists. One afternoon, during one of Jack's tours, his assistant Buford is eaten by an actual Graboid. Jack, Mindy, and Jack's customers manage to escape to warn the town, and Burt determines there are three Graboids in the area.

The residents begin taking action to kill the Graboids, but they are stopped by government agents Charlie Rusk and Frank Statler and a paleontologist, Dr. Andrew Merliss, who claim the Graboids are an endangered species, thereby preventing the humans from hunting them. Jack manages to reach an agreement with the agents that if they capture one live Graboid, Burt and the residents will be allowed to kill the remaining two. Burt grudgingly agrees, and he and Jack set out to trap a Graboid while the agents go after another of their own accord. Melvin Plug, a fellow survivor from the original attacks, approaches Burt in the hopes of buying his land and developing it into a town. After he refuses, a Graboid attacks and swallows Burt whole. Jack lures the Graboid to Burt's home, having it fatally collide with the underground concrete barriers surrounding the building. He then uses a chainsaw to free Burt from its belly.

Burt, Jack, Jodi, and Miguel later find a badly wounded Merliss; before dying, he explains that he and the government agents were ambushed by Shriekers from the Graboid they were chasing. While tracking the Shriekers, an albino Graboid — later named El Blanco — traps them on rocks for the night. Miguel deduces El Blanco can't produce Shriekers because it's infertile. After drawing El Blanco away, they find that the Shriekers have molted their skin, becoming winged creatures capable of rocket-propelled flight. Miguel is killed by the creature, which then crashes into a metal fence, killing itself. Burt realizes that chemicals in their stomachs react explosively, enabling their flight. Finding them capable of carrying Graboid eggs, they surmise that they evolved to spread them by flight. Jodi dubs the new form Ass-Blasters. Meanwhile, Nancy and Mindy are attacked by an Ass-Blaster in town and hide in a freezer while distracting it with food.

Using a mattress as cover from the Ass-Blasters' infrared vision, the group gets to Burt's house, but is forced to flee when an Ass-Blaster attempts to break in. To keep it from multiplying like its predecessors, Burt rigs his house and his stash of MREs to explode, killing it; however, it is only after that that they learn from Nancy that Ass-Blasters do not multiply but fall asleep after eating, as has happened to the one that attacked her and Mindy. The group flees to a junkyard, where they build a potato gun from everyday objects to ignite the combustible materials in the Ass-Blasters' stomachs. After they kill four, Burt is attacked by El Blanco and pinned down. Realizing that Burt's ultrasonic watch is repeatedly drawing El Blanco to them, Jack takes it and sticks it to the final Ass-Blaster. El Blanco devours it, saving Burt and Jodi's lives in the process.

In the aftermath, Nancy manages to sell the captive Ass-Blaster, while Jack pursues a romantic relationship with Jodi, depressing Mindy, who had a crush on him. Meanwhile, Melvin tries again to approach Burt about selling his land, but Burt informs him that since El Blanco is an endangered species and illegal to hunt, and formed a mutual unspoken friendship with Burt, the residents have decided to take precautions in order to live safely alongside it, thus turning Perfection into a federally protected Graboid reserve and barring Melvin from developing a town. Burt then leaves Melvin standing on a rock with El Blanco circling below.

== Cast ==
- Michael Gross as Burt Gummer
- Shawn Christian as Jack
- Susan Chuang as Jodi
- Charlotte Stewart as Nancy Sterngood
- Ariana Richards as Mindy Sterngood
- Tony Genaro as Miguel
- Barry Livingston as Merliss
- John Pappas as Rusk
- Robert Jayne as Melvin Plug
- Billy Rieck as Buford
- Mary Gross as a tourist mom

== Production ==
The film was greenlit by Universal in August 2000.

In Tremors 3 some of the graboids were created using CGI, which was the first time a Tremors film had used CGI to make a graboid. The graboids seen in the previous films were full-sized puppets and 1/4 scale miniatures. Some of the shriekers seen in Tremors 3 were also CGI, as well as some of the shriekers seen in the second film. However, due to software compatibility issues, the shrieker CGI from the second film could not be reused. Instead, new digital models were created by HimAnI productions using laser scans of existing physical models, which were used in the second film, created by ADI.

== Release ==
Tremors 3: Back to Perfection was released on VHS and DVD on October 1, 2001.

== Reception ==
Tremors 3: Back to Perfection holds an approval rating of 80% on Rotten Tomatoes based on five reviews. At the Video Premiere Awards show, in 2001, Michael Gross won the award for best actor for his work in Tremors 3. In an essay on direct-to-video horror sequels, Gavin Al-Asif for the Houston Chronicle said "[Tremors 3] is a jarring step down in quality from its predecessor," but called Gross's performance "absolutely brilliant" and "the one shining element in an otherwise mostly dull movie".

It’s nice to return to this community, and the actors retain their wit and sparkle. The production values are substantially lower, some of the jokes are recycled, and the grand finale is lackluster, but there’s still an underlying affection for these characters, even those doggone wormies, and their precarious situation. All in all, taken for what it is, Tremors 3 is worth a gander.

— AMC Movie Guide,
