= Christopher Gartin =

American actor

- Born: Christopher Gartin; January 12, 1968 (age 58); New York City, United States
- Other name: Chris Gartin
- Occupation: Actor
- Spouse: Joanne Ahlfield

Christopher Gartin (born January 12, 1968) is an American actor and producer, known for Black Swan (2010), Tremors 2: Aftershocks (1996), and Transcendence (2014).

== Filmography ==
film
Year	Title	Role	Notes
1984	Firstborn	Adam	
1989	Parent Trap III	David	Television film
1990	Matters of the Heart	Steven Harper	TV movie
1991	Changes	Mark Hallam	TV movie
1991	The Story Lady	Scott	TV movie
1996	Tremors 2: Aftershocks	Grady Hoover	Direct to video
1996	Johns	Eli	
1998	How to Make the Cruelest Month	Dr. Rutledge	
2001	Friends & Family	Danny Russo	
2005	Flightplan	Mike	
2006	Jane Doe: The Harder They Fall	Doug Maynard	TV movie
2008	Sweet Nothing in My Ear	Dr. Weisman	
2009	The Goods: Live Hard, Sell Hard	Selleck Customer – Husband	
2010	Black Swan	Sexy Waiter Scott	
2014	Transcendence	Tech Conference Coordinator	
2016	Is That a Gun in Your Pocket?	Harlan	
2017	mother!	Adulterer	
2021	Ultrasound	Alex Harris	

TV shows and appearances
Year	Title	Role	Notes
1988	Aaron's Way	Mickey Lo Verde	14 episodes
1989	Baywatch	Greg	1 episode
1990	Who's the Boss?	Eric	1 episode
1992	Room for Two	Todd	
1994	Melrose Place	Ted Ramsey	2 episodes
1994–1995	M.A.N.T.I.S.	Taylor Savage	main cast – 22 episodes
1996	Buddies	John Bailey	main cast – 13 episodes
1997	Party of Five	Drew Bishop	1 episode
1999	Law & Order	Dennis Michaels	1 episode
2003	NYPD Blue	Carl	1 episode
2003	Boomtown	Jonny Rand	1 episode
2003	Less than Perfect	Trevor	1 episode
2004	Crossing Jordan	Dr. Phillip Winter	1 episode
2005	Will & Grace	Desmond	1 episode
2005	The Bad Girl's Guide	Doug	2 episodes
2006	House	Rob Hartman	Episode: "Finding Judas"
2007	Side Order of Life	Rick Purdy	Main cast – 13 episodes
2009	Private Practice	Keith Embry	1 episode
2009	True Blood	Hugo	3 episodes
2009	Drop Dead Diva	Mr. Hess	1 episode
2010	The Deep End	Robin Reynolds	1 episode
2010	Numbers	Sean Westmark	1 episode
2010	The Glades	Peter Lang	1 episode
2014	CSI: Crime Scene Investigation	Dr. Holloway (2010); Marcus Corcoran (2005)	2 episodes
2011	Desperate Housewives	Rashi / Herbert Brickmeyer	1 episode
2011	The Mentalist	Alex Sodko	1 episode
2011–2012	Shameless	Chip Lishman	2 episode
2012	CSI: NY	Dan Coleman	1 episode
2014	Rush	Max Zarella	2 episodes
2014–2015	Perception	Father Pat	4 episodes – recurring
2015	NCIS	Jason Tupperman	1 episode
2016	Code Black	Robert Stein	1 episode
