= Tremors 2: Aftershocks =

1996 film by S. S. Wilson

- Promotional release poster
- Directed by: S. S. Wilson
- Written by: Brent Maddock; S. S. Wilson
- Produced by: Nancy Roberts; Christopher DeFaria
- Starring: Fred Ward; Christopher Gartin; Helen Shaver; Marcelo Tubert; Michael Gross
- Cinematography: Virgil Harper
- Edited by: Bob Ducsay
- Music by: Jay Ferguson
- Production company: Stampede Entertainment
- Distributed by: MCA Home Entertainment
- Release date: April 9, 1996
- Running time: 95 minutes
- Country: United States
- Language: English
- Budget: $4 million

Tremors 2: Aftershocks is a 1996 American comedy horror film and the sequel to Tremors (1990). In the film, Earl Bassett, returning from the first film, is hired to deal with a subterranean "graboid" infestation at a Mexican oilfield. It was directed by S. S. Wilson, and stars Fred Ward, Christopher Gartin, Helen Shaver, Marcelo Tubert, and Michael Gross. The film is the second in the Tremors franchise. It was followed by a 2001 sequel, Tremors 3: Back to Perfection.

== Plot ==
Years after the events of the first film, Val McKee has moved away and married Rhonda LeBeck, while Earl Basset has squandered his fortune on a failing ostrich ranch. He is approached by Carlos Ortega, who informs him that Graboids are killing his workers at his oil field in Chiapas, Mexico, and hires him to hunt them down. Earl initially declines, but Ortega's taxi driver, Grady Hoover, convinces Earl to change his mind after mentioning that Ortega will pay $50,000 for each Graboid killed; both join the hunt. Upon arrival, Earl learns that the company would pay him double if he caught one of the creatures alive. He also meets geologist Kate Reilly, her assistant Julio, and a mechanic named Pedro, all of whom are conducting scientific investigations into the Graboids.

Earl and Grady begin systematically killing the Graboids by using remote-controlled cars rigged with explosives. Though their strategy seems to work, the vast number of Graboids overwhelms them, and Earl enlists the help of Burt Gummer, who arrives with a deuce loaded with firearms and explosives. The next day, Earl and Grady are surprised by a Graboid, causing them to back up in a panic and crash the truck into an incline. Returning to where they saw the Graboid, Earl and Grady find the creature sick and nonaggressive, with all its tentacles mysteriously dead. Realizing they have one of the creatures alive (which Ortega offered $100,000 for), they call Pedro to come pick them up, along with the Graboid.

However, the Graboid later begins making horrific and painful sounds and is soon found dead with a huge hole torn open in its body. They see Pedro's truck approach from a distance, but it suddenly stops, prompting Grady and Earl to investigate. They find the truck in disrepair with its engine destroyed, and find Pedro’s remains on the back of the truck. Earl begins to panic, but they eventually decide to make their way to the nearby radio broadcasting station. When they arrive, they discover the radio equipment in ruins and are met by strange bipedal graboid-like creatures. Earl successfully kills one as it charges them, and the two flee in a car they had found as more of the creatures arrive. Meanwhile, Burt's truck is ambushed by a pack of these new creatures while returning to base.

The following morning, the creatures have made their way to the oil refinery, where Julio is violently devoured by one. Grady and Earl arrive and kill it before it can attack Kate, and they tell her the news of Pedro’s death and the loss of the radio tower. Burt’s damaged truck arrives after a near-fatal firefight that has left him drained of ammunition. Through experimentation, the group discovers that these creatures (now dubbed 'Shriekers') are hermaphrodites that can replicate at an incredible rate after eating enough food. They also learn that the creatures are deaf, but can see heat through special infrared receptors on their heads. They are attacked by the Shriekers, who have discovered Burt's MRE supply and have rapidly multiplied. They run for Julio's car, but Burt accidentally disables it while killing a Shrieker.

Hiding from the Shriekers, Burt is trapped in a bulldozer while Grady, Kate, and Earl are on top of an oil tower. The Shriekers work together to climb the tower, only for Burt to trap them in the storage shed with the truck. However, they discover that rice flour is also stored inside, enabling the Shriekers to continue multiplying. Earl douses himself in CO_{2} from a fire extinguisher to hide his body heat and tries to find Burt's explosives amongst the Shriekers, who have greatly multiplied. While the plan initially works, the CO_{2} quickly wears off, and the Shriekers detect his body heat, forcing Earl to throw the detonator among Burt's supplies before escaping. The group manages to escape before a massive explosion devastates the entire facility, killing all of the Shriekers. In the aftermath, Earl and Kate decide to pursue a relationship, while Grady suggests opening a Graboid-themed theme park due to the money Ortega now owes them.

== Cast ==
- Fred Ward as Earl Bassett
- Christopher Gartin as Grady Hoover
- Helen Shaver as Kate White
- Michael Gross as Burt Gummer
- Marcelo Tubert as Senor Ortega
- Marco Hernandez as Julio
- José Rosario as Pedro
- Thomas Rosales Jr. as an oil worker

== Production ==
=== Development ===
Tremors 2: Aftershocks began production in 1993 when MCA Universal (feature films division) liked the script. The film was originally planned to be filmed in Australia on a 17-million-dollar budget, with the proposal that Kevin Bacon and Reba McEntire would both be returning. McEntire declined due to a major tour she had currently been on, and Bacon, while intrigued, ultimately turned it down to do Apollo 13. Due to the lack of star power and the mediocre box-office performance of the first film, the distribution and promotional costs for a theater release were considered too high, and the feature film division lost interest. The film was on the verge of being canceled entirely due to high costs when several actors and effects artists offered to lower their rates or do the jobs for free just to help the film get produced; this included S.S. Wilson, who offered to direct the film for free to save money on hiring another director.

Although the first film was only a minor theatrical hit, it would go on to be far more successful on the home-video rental market. This led to Tremors 2 being moved to the MCA/Universal home video division on a $4 million budget. Despite the budget being severely slashed, the same script was ultimately used, with several special effects sequences scrapped, including a scene where Burt Gummer commandeers a tank and another where characters fight the monsters with American Civil War muskets. To assist with costs, the location was changed from Australia to southern Mexico. Filming took place near Valencia in a total of 27 days in early 1994. The film was also released straight-to-video with only a limited theater release.

=== Props ===
In Tremors 2: Aftershocks, the creature design team, Amalgamated Dynamics, was faced with a challenge different from the first film. In Tremors, the graboids spend most of their time underground, and thus a prop was not needed for these scenes. However, in this film the shriekers spend all their time above ground and there are always more shriekers than graboids, thus the need for more props. The shrieker props used in the film include two fully articulated, full-scale puppet shrieker, three hand-puppet versions of the shriekers, and three un-jointed non-articulated rubber shrieker dummies. The fully articulated, full-scale puppet shrieker required 16 puppeteers to operate, while the rubber shrieker dummies, not requiring puppeteers, were used in scenes when a shrieker needed to be dropped, shot, or exploded.

One of the full scale graboids used in the film was a refurbished model that was used in the first film.

=== Effects ===
To achieve the infrared view of the shriekers as seen in several scenes, the actors wore red suits and yellow stockings, then were shot in Hi-8 video tape and blown up to 35mm film to add an additional grainy effect. The post-production video engineers then rendered the faces and bodies in different colors.

The scene where a baby shrieker is seen was created using a full size shrieker in a large cage, making the shrieker look small. As a consequence, no actors could be shown at the same time as the cage and shrieker.

In addition to the shriekers designed by Amalgamated Dynamics, some scenes in the film utilized shriekers that were computer generated imagery (CGI) designed by Tippett Studio. These animated shriekers were used whenever the film depicts them as walking, running, or climbing, as these movements were beyond the capabilities of the fully articulated puppet shriekers.

== Release ==
After completion, the film's release date was repeatedly delayed despite test screenings receiving glowing reviews, prompting the creators and the studio to consider theatrical distribution. A release date was finally set for April 9, 1996, over two years after the film had been finished. Although a theatrical release was deemed too expensive, the film did receive a very small limited screening in international theaters with an exclusive premiere screening that took place on April 9, 1996 at 8 PM in the Alfred Hitchcock Theater in Hollywood, California. The film was released on VHS on April 9, 1996, and on LaserDisc on April 16, 1996.

== Reception ==
=== Critical response ===
As of April 2024, Tremors 2: Aftershocks holds a 64% rating on Rotten Tomatoes based on reviews from eleven critics, with an average rating of 5/10. TV Guide gave the film a positive review, saying "this movie is a rarity among direct-to-video sequels, one that's not only worthy of its theatrical predecessor but suggests that it too, belongs on the big screen...despite the significantly lower budget, the monsters remain entirely convincing." Ty Burr of Entertainment Weekly gave the film a mixed C+, calling it "definitely not as bad as a lot of straight-to-tape sequels" and further praised the acting, cinematography, and effects, but gave negative criticisms to the film's second half, saying "the movie becomes a bald-faced imitation of Jurassic Park."

While Tremors 2 lacks the vulgar humor, which made the first film feel so appealing, it retains its predecessors redneck charm and gleeful creature-killing violence and gore. Not merely a rehash, this is a moderately original film.

— David Bleiler, TLA Film and Video Guide: The Discerning Film Lover's Guide 2000-2001 (page 594)
