= Nancy Roberts (producer) =

Nancy Roberts is an American motion picture and television producer and writer who is the managing partner of Stampede Entertainment. She was previously a talent agent and later a talent manager who ran her own company called The Roberts Company.

== Filmography ==
Year	Title	Producer	Writer	Notes
1993	Heart and Souls	Yes	No	
1996	Tremors 2: Aftershocks	Yes	No	Direct-to-video
2001	Tremors 3: Back to Perfection	Yes	Story	Direct-to-video
2003	Tremors	Executive	Yes	Developer and producer 13 episodes (wrote 2 episodes)
2004	Tremors 4: The Legend Begins	Yes	Story	Direct-to-video
