= S. S. Wilson =

American screenwriter and filmmaker

- Born: Steven Seth Wilson; United States
- Occupations: Screenwriter, producer, director, author

Steven Seth Wilson is an American science fiction screenwriter, and is probably best known for writing (and occasionally directing), with writing partner Brent Maddock, the Tremors film and television series. Wilson is a founding partner of Stampede Entertainment.

== Filmography ==
=== Feature films ===
Year	Title	Director	Writer	Producer	Other	Credit	Notes
1986	Short Circuit	No	Yes	No	No		
1987	Batteries Not Included	No	Yes	No	No		
1988	Short Circuit 2	No	Yes	No	No		
1988	The Land Before Time	No	No	No	Yes	Story consultant	
1990	Tremors	No	Yes	Yes	Yes	Second unit director	
1990	Ghost Dad	No	Yes	No	No		
1993	Heart and Souls	No	Yes	No	No		
1996	Tremors 2: Aftershocks	Yes	Yes	No	Yes	Voice cameo as "War Documentary Narrator"	Direct-to-video
1999	Wild Wild West	No	Yes	No	No		
2001	Tremors 3: Back to Perfection	No	Story	Executive	Yes	Second unit director	Direct-to-video
2004	Tremors 4: The Legend Begins	Yes	Story	Executive	No		Direct-to-video

=== Short films ===
Year	Title	Director	Writer	Animator
1975	Recorded Live	Yes	Yes	Yes
1980	Deer in the Works	No	Yes	No
1980	The Reference Section	No	Yes	No
1982	The Adventures of Curious George	No	No	Yes
1985	Frog and Toad Are Friends	No	No	Additional

=== TV series ===
Year	Title	Writer	Executive Producer	Developer
1985	M.A.S.K.	Yes	No	No
2003	Tremors	Yes	Yes	Yes

== Publications ==
- Tucker's Monster (2010)
