= Batteries Not Included =

1987 film by Matthew Robbins

- Theatrical release poster by Drew Struzan
- Directed by: Matthew Robbins
- Screenplay by: Brad Bird; Matthew Robbins; Brent Maddock; S. S. Wilson
- Story by: Mick Garris
- Produced by: Ronald L. Schwary
- Starring: Hume Cronyn; Jessica Tandy
- Cinematography: John McPherson
- Edited by: Cynthia Scheider
- Music by: James Horner
- Production company: Amblin Entertainment
- Distributed by: Universal Pictures
- Release date: December 18, 1987
- Running time: 106 minutes
- Country: United States
- Language: English
- Budget: $25 million
- Box office: $70 million

Batteries Not Included is a 1987 American science fiction film directed by Matthew Robbins and produced by Ronald L. Schwary. It stars Hume Cronyn and Jessica Tandy as a couple who are helped by extraterrestrials when their Manhattan apartment block is threatened by property developers.

Batteries Not Included was conceived by Steven Spielberg for the 1980s television anthology series Amazing Stories. It was expanded into a feature film by Mick Garris, with further drafts by Brad Bird and Matthew Robbins. Batteries Not Included was theatrically released in the US on December 18, 1987, by Universal Pictures. It grossed $70 million on a budget of $25 million.

== Plot ==
Frank and Faye Riley, an elderly couple, manage an apartment building and cafe in the East Village, Manhattan. Their tenants are Mason, an unsuccessful artist; Marisa, a pregnant woman waiting for her boyfriend to return; the janitor, Harry, a retired boxer; and an older couple, Muriel and Sid.

Lacy, a property development manager, sends a gangster, Carlos, to bribe the occupants to move out. When they resist, Carlos punches through Mason's door, intimidates Marisa, destroys Harry's property, and vandalizes the cafe. Faye, who is suffering from dementia, believes Carlos is their deceased son, Bobby, and asks Frank to treat him kindly. Muriel and Sid take the bribe and move to a retirement home in New Jersey.

That night, two flying mechanical creatures visit the Rileys' apartment and repair the cafe, putting Frank and Faye back in business. The creatures take up residence in a shed on the roof. Carlos returns to threaten the tenants, but the creatures scare him away.

The female creature gives birth to three babies. One is stillborn, but Harry repairs it. The demolition crew boost business in the cafe, while the creatures help in the kitchen. When Marisa's boyfriend returns to say he has found work in Chicago, Marisa tells him to go without her and begins a relationship with Mason.

Unhappy with the delays, Lacey fires Carlos. Carlos breaks into the basement to sabotage the pipework and electricity and attacks the father creature. After Harry throws him out, Frank and the tenants realize the children are missing and search for them in the city. Faye stays behind with the mother as it fixes the father. With the father repaired, the creatures find their children with Harry and leave.

With the building still not empty, Lacey sends a professional to burn it down. Enraged, Carlos rigs the building to explode instead, but discovers that Faye is still in the building. When Faye refuses to leave, Carlos lies that he is Bobby, but she realizes he is lying. He rescues her as the fire spreads.

By the next morning, the building has been destroyed. The demolition crew refuse to continue as Harry is sitting on the steps. The mechanical creatures return with dozens of others and restore the building, ending Lacey's plans. Carlos visits the Rileys in the hospital; when Frank introduces him as Bobby, Faye weeps, and Carlos leaves dejected. Years later, the building is dwarfed by skyscrapers and the cafe is thriving again.

== Cast ==
- Hume Cronyn as Frank Riley
- Jessica Tandy as Faye Riley
- Frank McRae as Harry
- Elizabeth Peña as Marisa
- Michael Carmine as Carlos
- Dennis Boutsikaris as Mason
- Tom Aldredge as Sid
- Jane Hoffman as Muriel
- John DiSanti as Gus
- John Pankow as Kovacs
- MacIntyre Dixon as DeWitt
- Luis Guzmán as Bystander
- Michael Greene as Lacey
- Doris Belack as Mrs. Thompson
- Wendy Schaal as Pamela

James LeGros and José Santana received opening credit billing as two of Carlos' goons.

== Production ==
Batteries Not Included was conceived by Steven Spielberg as an episode of his 1980s television anthology series Amazing Stories. Instead, Spielberg decided to produce it as a feature film. Mick Garris, a story editor on Amazing Stories, wrote the first two drafts of the screenplay, expanding Spielberg's half-hour television script. Spielberg brought in Matthew Robbins, with whom he had worked on The Sugarland Express, to rewrite the script with Brad Bird. The final shooting script was reworked by S. S. Wilson and Brent Maddock.

== Reception ==
Batteries Not Included debuted at number 4 at the US box office with a gross of $3.3 million in its opening weekend. It went on to gross $32.9 million in the United States and Canada. Internationally, it grossed $38 million, for a worldwide total of $70.9 million.

On the review aggregator website Rotten Tomatoes, 57% of 21 critics' reviews are positive, with an average rating of 5.6/10. Metacritic, which uses a weighted average, assigned Batteries Not Included a score of 54 out of 100, based on 14 critics, indicating "mixed or average" reviews. Variety wrote that it "could have used more imaginative juices to distinguish it from other, more enchanting Spielbergian pics where lovable mechanical things solve earthly human dilemmas," but that it was "suitable entertainment for kids". Roger Ebert gave it three out of four, writing that it was "sweet, cheerful and funny family entertainment".

In the Chicago Reader, Harry Sheenan gave Batteries Not Included three out of four and wrote that it was a "corrosive portrait of middle-American selfishness and greed, exclusion and racism ... either the most ingenuous or the most subversive film of the year". He wrote that the villain, Carlos, is revealed as a victim of capitalism, and that the final image "in one sense a triumph of happiness, is also a perfect criticism of materialism, an image of property looming over the human landscape, dominating and controlling it".

=== Awards ===
| Award | Category | Recipient(s) | Outcome |
|---|---|---|---|
| Saturn Awards | Best Fantasy Film | | Nominated |
| Saturn Awards | Best Actress | Jessica Tandy | Won |
| Young Artist Awards | Best Family Motion Picture - Comedy | | Won |

== See also ==
- Self-replicating machine
- List of films featuring extraterrestrials
