= Marcelo Tubert =

American actor

- Born: Cordoba, Argentina
- Other names: Marcello Tubert; Marc Tubert
- Occupation: Actor
- Years active: 1983-present
- Website: Official website

Marcelo Tubert is an Argentine-born American actor.

== Biography ==
=== Early life and career ===
Born in Córdoba, Argentina, Tubert's mother, Miriam Tubert, is an actress who did a great deal of stage work and had her own children's radio show. Tubert's introduction to theatre came at the age of three, in Garcia Lorca's Yerma, when a child actor in a visiting troupe became ill. When he was seven, Marcelo and his family moved to Los Angeles where he later took up acting seriously in high school then studied at Los Angeles City College's Theatre Arts Department.

Among his many early influences, he cites actor Alejandro Rey. Tubert began with small television and film roles. As those roles grew larger, he was also proving his versatility, establishing himself in theatre and with commercial and voiceover work.

=== Television ===
Tubert's recurring and guest-starring appearances include such shows as Prison Break, NCIS, Jane the Virgin, New Girl CSI:Miami, Supah Ninjas, Without a Trace, ER, The War At Home, Monk, George Lopez, JAG, Frasier, L.A. Law, Seinfeld, Star Trek: The Next Generation, The Golden Girls and Star Trek: Picard.

=== Film and voice roles ===
Tubert's numerous film roles include parts in the films Miss Congeniality 2: Armed and Fabulous, Tremors 2: Aftershocks, Postcards from the Edge, and the 1989 Roger Corman-produced remake of The Masque of the Red Death.

Among his most notable voice roles, was as Laurent in the English version of Toys in the Attic. Other roles include in the animated series Pinky and the Brain, Batman: The Animated Series, The Real Adventures of Jonny Quest and King of the Hill. He has also contributed additional voices to Kung Fu Panda 2, Madagascar: Escape 2 Africa, Over the Hedge, Shrek 2, Shark Tale, Apocalypto, and The Passion of the Christ.

== Selected filmography ==
=== Television ===
Year	Title	Role	Notes
1984–1985	Simon & Simon	Suvi Raj	3 episodes
1986	The Golden Girls	Raoul	Episode: "Flu Attack"
1992	Batman: The Animated Series	Carlos, Scarface	Voice, 2 episodes
1996	The Real Adventures of Jonny Quest	Reporter, Delerict	Voice, episode: "Manhattan Maneater"
1997	Superman: The Animated Series	Sonar Man	Voice, episode: "The Prometheon"
1998	Pinky and the Brain	Hector Papadopolis	Voice, episode: "Dangerous Brains"
1999	The Wild Thornberrys	Tanger, Official	Voice, episode: "Two's Company"
2000	Batman Beyond	Ortiz	Voice, episode: "Sneak Peek"
2000–2001	Static Shock	Doctor, Captain, Technician	Voice, 3 episodes
2001	JAG	Admiral Picato	Episode: "Collision Course"
2001	The Zeta Project	Lorrie	Voice, episode: "The Next Gen"
2002	Clifford the Big Red Dog	Announcer, Husband	Voice, 2 episodes
2004	JAG	Chief Judge Carlo Berlusconi	Episode: "People v. SecNav"
2004	The West Wing	Saeb Mukarat	3 episodes
2006	Hellsing Ultimate	Doctor	Voice
2006–2009	Handy Manny	Mr. Alvarez	Voice, 3 episodes
2007	Cane	Marcos Greenberg, Mooses	3 episodes
2007–2008	Cory in the House	Raum Paroom	5 episodes
2016	Jane the Virgin	Pablo Segura	2 episodes
2022	Star Trek: Picard	Mr. Alvarez	Episode: "Assimilation"
2025	Leviathan	Sultan	Voice

=== Film ===
Year	Title	Role	Notes
1995	Leprechaun 3	Gupta	Direct-to-video
1996	Tremors 2: Aftershocks	Senor Carlos Ortega	Direct-to-video
2005	Tugger: The Jeep 4x4 Who Wanted to Fly	Bob, Fatty	Voice
2009	Toys in the Attic	Laurent	Voice, English dub
2010	Alpha and Omega	Max	Voice
2015	Justice League: Gods and Monsters	Tough Guy	Voice, direct-to-video
2025	Idiotka	Oleg	

=== Video games ===
Year	Title	Role	Notes
1997	Lands of Lore: Guardians of Destiny	Ja Kel, additional voices	
1999	Lands of Lore III	David LeGre, Dimple, Jakel	
1999	Spyro 2: Ripto's Rage!	Basil, Colossus Monks	
2000	Spyro: Year of the Dragon	Gus, Marco, Tomb Pharaohs, Purple Dragon	
2002	Command & Conquer: Renegade	Additional voices	
2003	Kill Switch	Soldier	
2005	Age of Empires III	Suleiman the Magnificent	
2007	BioShock	Toasty	
2007	Pirates of the Caribbean: At World's End	Town Musician	
2010	BioShock 2	Toasty, Ducky	
2010	Fallout: New Vegas	White Legs (Male)	
2013	République	Luis Octavo	
