= Short Circuit 2 =

1988 film by Kenneth Johnson

- Theatrical release poster
- Directed by: Kenneth Johnson
- Written by: S. S. Wilson; Brent Maddock
- Produced by: David Foster; Lawrence Turman; Gary Foster
- Starring: Fisher Stevens; Michael McKean; Cynthia Gibb; Jack Weston; Tim Blaney
- Cinematography: John McPherson
- Edited by: Conrad Buff IV
- Music by: Charles Fox
- Production company: The Turman-Foster Company
- Distributed by: Tri-Star Pictures
- Release date: July 6, 1988
- Running time: 110 minutes
- Country: United States
- Language: English
- Budget: $15 million
- Box office: $21.6 million (domestic)

Short Circuit 2 is a 1988 American science fiction comedy film and the sequel to the 1986 film Short Circuit. It was directed by Kenneth Johnson (in his feature directorial debut) and stars Fisher Stevens as Ben Jahveri, Michael McKean as Fred Ritter, Cynthia Gibb as Sandy Banatoni, and Tim Blaney as the voice of Johnny 5 the friendly, naive, self-aware robot. Short Circuit 2 was released by Tri-Star Pictures on July 6, 1988. The film received mixed reviews from critics and was not as financially successful as its predecessor, grossing $21 million on a $15 million budget.

== Plot ==
After resigning from Nova Robotics after the events of the first movie, Benjamin Jahrvi (né Jabituya) starts up his own business, "Titanic Toy Corporation", which specializes in making sophisticated toy robots that he builds by hand from the back of his truck. For two days, Ben has been in an unspecified U.S. metropolis peddling his toy robots on the street corners. One robot wanders away from his stand and ends up in the office of Sandy Banatoni, an assistant buyer for Simpsons' toy department. Sandy tracks Ben down and orders 1,000 of his toys. Overhearing this offer is con artist Fred Ritter, who smooth-talks his way into brokering the transaction between Ben and Sandy, becoming Ben's business partner in the deal, and later acquires the funding Ben needs from a loan shark.

Ben and Fred hire some workers and move into a derelict warehouse which, unknown to them, is the base of operations for thieves who are tunneling into a bank vault across the street to steal a set of jewels known as the Vanderveer Collection. The thieves (Saunders and Jones) assault Ben and Fred and destroy their equipment, causing the new workers to flee and preventing them from completing Sandy's order. However, Ben's friends Stephanie Speck and Newton Crosby have sent Johnny 5, a robot who became sentient after being struck by lightning whom Ben helped to create. When Saunders and Jones return, Johnny fends them off, then sets up self-defense mechanisms should they try to break in again. Johnny sets to work mass-producing the toys to meet Sandy's deadline but later leaves to explore the city. He runs afoul of many people, who are rude and unfriendly to him. He befriends one man, Oscar Baldwin, who works at the bank across the street from Ben and Fred's warehouse.

Fred, having learned that Johnny is worth $11 million, tries to sell him. Discovering this, Johnny escapes into the city, is taken into police custody, and is placed in the stolen goods warehouse, where he is claimed by Ben. Johnny uses his robotic abilities to help Ben court Sandy.

Oscar is revealed as the mastermind of the heist, employing both Saunders and Jones. With time running out before the Vanderveer Collection is moved from the bank, Oscar has Saunders and Jones lock Ben and Fred in the freezer of a Chinese restaurant, while he tricks Johnny into finishing the tunnel leading to the vault. Ben and Fred get Sandy to save them, using touch tone renditions of songs that Ben learned on his date with her as clues to their location. Discovering the Vanderveer Collection and Oscar's true intentions, Johnny is severely damaged by Saunders and Jones per Oscar’s orders. As Ben, Fred and Sandy return to the warehouse, the police arrest Ben and Sandy as suspects in the bank vault break-in. Fred eludes capture and later finds the disheveled Johnny in an alley and informs him of Ben's arrest.

Fred attempts to repair Johnny by breaking into a Radio Shack and following Johnny's guidance, but with limited success. Ben and Sandy are cleared of any charges for the break-in and persuade the police to help locate Johnny. An enraged Johnny vows revenge for Oscar’s betrayal, and with Fred’s help, tracks down Oscar and his accomplices. Saunders and Jones are caught by Fred and Johnny and later arrested. However, Oscar attacks Fred and attempts to flee on a boat. Johnny gives chase and, as his backup battery dwindles, uses a crane to swing Tarzan-style to capture Oscar, who is then apprehended by police. Ben, Fred, and Sandy arrive and tend to an exhausted Johnny while the last of his power supply depletes, and he seemingly dies. Ben revives Johnny with a defibrillator.

Johnny is fully repaired and becomes a celebrity, while Ben, Fred, and Sandy start a new company called "Input Inc." with Johnny as its mascot. Johnny and Ben later take the Oath of Allegiance to become United States citizens. After the ceremony, when questioned by reporters about his thoughts on becoming the country's first robotic citizen, a gold-plated Johnny leaps into the air and exclaims "I feel alive!"

== Cast ==
- Tim Blaney as the voice of Johnny 5, the self-aware robot
- Fisher Stevens as Ben Jahveri, one of Johnny 5's original engineers, the peddler, later toy robot builder
- Michael McKean as Fred Ritter, the con artist
- Cynthia Gibb as Sandy Banatoni, Assistant Buyer, Simpson's Toy Department
- Jack Weston as Oscar Baldwin, the First Federal Trust Bank Worker, later Heist Mastermind
- David Hemblen as Jones, the older bank robber
- Dee McCafferty as Saunders, the young bank robber
- Don Lake as Manic Mike, the Radio Shack owner
- Ally Sheedy as Stephanie Speck (voice only, uncredited)
- Gerry Parkes as Priest

== Production ==
Short Circuit 2 had initially been developed with the original film's director John Badham, but Badham dropped out in order to do Stakeout, and was replaced by Kenneth Johnson, best known as the creator/producer of the 1970s TV series' The Bionic Woman, The Incredible Hulk as well as the science fiction franchise V.

Principal photography of the film took place between September 13 and December 1987 in Toronto, Ontario, Canada. Despite the film taking place in an American metropolis, much of the shots throughout the film featured prominent downtown Toronto landmarks. Five robots were used for filming the "Johnny 5" character. Reported complications arose with their hydraulic and electrical systems due to rainy and cold weather during production. The film's budget was reportedly $15 million.

The movie was originally titled Short Circuit 2: More Input, as seen on much of the promotional material.

== Reception ==
=== Critical response ===
Short Circuit 2 received mixed reviews. On Rotten Tomatoes, it has an approval rating of 43% based on reviews from 14 critics, with an average rating of 4.6/10. Audiences surveyed by CinemaScore gave it a grade A−.

Vincent Canby, writing in The New York Times, gave Short Circuit 2 a negative review. He wrote: "For anyone over the age of 6, the film is as much fun as wearing wet sneakers". Rita Kempley, for The Washington Post, gave it a mixed review (6/10) saying: "Short Circuit 2 is unabashedly mawkish and sophomoric, and the actors support the technology. But if you're a kid, or an adult with an Erector Set, you might just enjoy this summer-weight caper". Most of the positive reviews were accepting of the film's flaws. Variety added: "Mild and meek, Short Circuit 2 has an uncomplicated sweetness as a successful follow-up to the original robot kiddie comedy".

Siskel & Ebert, having disliked the first film, gave Short Circuit 2 "two thumbs up". Roger Ebert said the movie "will probably seem better the younger you are" but that it was "pleasant" and "entertaining". Gene Siskel called it "better than the original", said the dialogue made him "laugh out loud" and argued that "the movie works" because he "felt bad" when the robot was being attacked. A review in the Los Angeles Times noted that "Wilson and Maddock have improved considerably here. They're just as derivative and glib, but more thoughtful. Their construction is more deft, their dialogue is better, and they make Number Five come more alive."

=== Box office ===
At the box office, Short Circuit 2 placed 7th on its first weekend making $3,843,067. It finished with $21,630,088, down almost half from what the first Short Circuit film made. It ranked 45th at the U.S. box office in 1988.

=== Accolades ===
The film was nominated at Saturn Awards in the categories Best Science Fiction Film and Best Special Effects (Eric Allard, Jeff Jarvis).

== Home media ==
Short Circuit 2 was released on August 7, 2001, and re-released on DVD on April 24, 2007, which included a "making-of featurette" on actor Fisher Stevens. In 2010, the film was released once again with alternative cover art. A Blu-ray disc of the film was released in April 2011, though no extras were included.

In 2021, a Blu-ray release of the movie was released in the United Kingdom, with several extras including commentary by Kenneth Johnson.

== Cancelled sequel ==
A script for the proposed Short Circuit 3 has been confirmed and revealed by the film crew, with the plot centered on Johnny 5 going to college. Early development on the third film began and script writing for the third film began in 1989 and then was rewritten in 1990. After the producers found the scenes unsatisfactory, the sequel was ultimately scrapped and cancelled.
