= Tremors 4: The Legend Begins =

2004 film by S. S. Wilson

- Promotional release poster
- Directed by: S. S. Wilson
- Screenplay by: Scott Buck
- Story by: S. S. Wilson; Brent Maddock; Nancy Roberts
- Produced by: Nancy Roberts
- Starring: Michael Gross; Sara Botsford; Brent Roam; Ming Lo; Lydia Look; Sam Ly; J. E. Freeman; August Schellenberg; Billy Drago
- Cinematography: Virgil L. Harper
- Edited by: Harry B. Miller III
- Music by: Jay Ferguson
- Production company: Stampede Entertainment
- Distributed by: Universal Pictures Home Entertainment
- Release date: January 2, 2004
- Running time: 97 minutes
- Country: United States
- Language: English

Tremors 4: The Legend Begins is a 2004 direct-to-video horror Western film directed by S. S. Wilson and written by Brent Maddock, Nancy Roberts, and Wilson. It is the fourth film in the Tremors series of films and released on DVD on January 2, 2004. As a prequel to the earlier films and television series, it depicts the town of Rejection, which is the location that would later be renamed Perfection, the main setting for the first Tremors film. It stars Michael Gross as Hiram Gummer, the great grandfather of the character Burt Gummer, who Gross portrayed in every other Tremors film.

== Plot ==
In 1889, the inhabitants of Rejection are completely dependent on the income from a nearby silver mine. One day, water from a hot spring causes graboid eggs to hatch, resulting in the death of 17 miners. Hiram Gummer, great-grandfather of Burt Gummer and the mine's owner, arrives in town to assess the situation. After juvenile graboids that can shoot out of the ground (later dubbed Dirt Dragons) attack his camp one night, he is shocked by their presence. One of his companions, Juan, kills one with a pickaxe, and the pair escape while four others accompanying them are killed.

Inexperienced with and not fond of firearms, Hiram puts out a call for a gunfighter, to which Black Hand Kelly responds. Hiram and Kelly do not get along well, though Kelly succeeds in conveying to Hiram some of his attitude towards firearms and life in general. Hiram, Juan, and Kelly discover that a total of four graboids have hatched, including the one Juan killed earlier. Kelly is later eaten alive by a now fully grown graboid. Hiram decides to abandon Rejection and tries to convince the townsfolk to do the same, but they refuse to leave their homes. They also force him to give them the silver mine, threatening to alert potential buyers to the danger if he sells it out from under them. In Carson City, Hiram learns of a telegram revealing that the fully grown graboids have made it through the pass and are headed for the town. Changing his mind, he buys weapons with the last of his valuable belongings, heads back to Rejection to lead a last stand against the graboids, and helps the town prepare itself.

After two graboids are killed, the third one adapts and avoids all of the traps. Hiram tricks it into coming to the surface and then attaches it by the tail to the flywheel of a steam traction engine. The graboid is reeled in and slammed against the front wheels and boiler with such force that it is explosively decapitated. With the creatures dead, the town decides to keep their existence secret for fear that no one would settle in the area if it were known, and to use the mine's proceeds to pay for their belongings. Hiram settles in Rejection (renamed Perfection), building his home in the same place where his great-grandson Burt's would one day be. He is also given a Colt 1865 Gatling gun and begins target practice, enjoying it.

== Cast ==
- Michael Gross as Hiram Gummer
- Sara Botsford as Christine Lord
- Billy Drago as Black Hand Kelly
- Brent Roam as Juan Padilla
- August Schellenberg as Tecopa
- J. E. Freeman as Old Fred
- Ming Lo as Pyong Lien Chang
- Lydia Look as Lu Wan Chang
- Sam Ly as Fu Yien Chang
- Neal Kopit as Víctor
- Matthew Seth Wilson as Brick Walters
- John Dixon as Big Horse Johnson
- Dan Lemieux as Stony Walters
- Don Ruffin as Soggy
- Lou Carlucci as Mine Foreman

== Video game ==
A browser game tie-in called Dirt Dragons was created to market the film and released on January 2, 2004. The game concept, development, and programming was done by the Stampede Entertainment webmaster Allan Krahl.
