= Heart and Souls =

1993 film by Ron Underwood

- Theatrical release poster
- Directed by: Ron Underwood
- Screenplay by: Brent Maddock; S. S. Wilson; Gregory Hansen; Erik Hansen
- Story by: Gregory Hansen; Erik Hansen; Brent Maddock; S. S. Wilson
- Produced by: Nancy Roberts; Sean Daniel
- Starring: Robert Downey Jr.; Charles Grodin; Kyra Sedgwick; Elisabeth Shue; Tom Sizemore; David Paymer; Alfre Woodard
- Cinematography: Michael Watkins
- Edited by: O. Nicholas Brown
- Music by: Marc Shaiman
- Production companies: Alphaville; Stampede Entertainment
- Distributed by: Universal Pictures
- Release date: August 13, 1993 (United States)
- Running time: 104 minutes
- Country: United States
- Language: English
- Budget: $25 million
- Box office: $16.5 million (US)

Heart and Souls is a 1993 American fantasy comedy-drama film directed by Ron Underwood. The film stars Robert Downey Jr. as Thomas Reilly, a businessman recruited by the souls of four deceased people, his guardian angels from childhood, to help them rectify their unfinished lives, as he is the only one who can communicate with them.

Heart and Souls was released by Universal Pictures on August 13, 1993. The film received mixed reviews from critics and grossed $16.5 million against a $25 million budget.

== Plot ==
In San Francisco, 1959, four despondent strangers embark on the same night trolleybus: Penny, a single mother, regrets working the night shift and leaving her three children at home; Harrison, a would-be singer, has backed out of an important audition due to stage fright; Julia leaves her waitressing job to seek out her boyfriend John, whose marriage proposal she rejected; and small-time thief Milo has just failed to retrieve a book of valuable stamps that he had conned out of a young boy. Their driver is Hal, who becomes distracted by an attractive passenger in another car and accidentally swerves the trolleybus off of an overpass, killing everyone aboard.

At the same time, Frank Reilly is driving his pregnant wife Eva to the hospital. Frank avoids the trolleybus just before it crashes. The Reillys are safe, but Eva delivers their baby in the car. Hal ascends into the next life, but the souls of the four passengers are "attached" to the newborn baby, Thomas, for reasons they do not understand. Only Thomas can see and hear them, and they are forced to follow him wherever he goes. As the years pass, the four grow to love Thomas, and he loves them. As Thomas grows older, however, his parents worry about his obsession with these "invisible people" and consider having him committed and getting divorced. Realizing their presence is hurting seven-year-old Thomas, the quartet decides to become invisible to him as well. The perceived abandonment causes young Thomas to avoid close relationships for the rest of his life, fearful that they, too, will leave him.

Twenty-seven years later, Hal returns with his trolleybus. Because his irresponsibility ended four innocent lives, Hal has been condemned to convey spirits to the next life, and he has now come for his former passengers. The quartet learns that they've been with Thomas all these years because each of them died with unfinished business: Penny never found out what happened to her children, Harrison never conquered his fears and fulfilled his dream of public singing, Julia never told John her true feelings, and Milo never returned the stamp album, which would have freed him of the guilt from his life of crime. Thomas was meant to serve as their corporeal form, helping them to resolve their final business; if he refused to help, they were to inhabit his body and use it to solve their problems. After convincing Hal to buy some more time for them to rectify their unfinished lives, they reappear to Thomas, now a ruthless foreclosure banker who refuses to open up to his devoted girlfriend Anne.

Thomas, who has since undergone psychotherapy to convince himself that his "imaginary friends" were only a childhood delusion, initially believes their reappearance means he has had a psychotic break. Ignoring their pleas, he attempts to check himself into a psychiatric hospital, where a schizophrenic patient is able to describe the spirits that accompany him. This convinces Thomas that the spirits are real, but he is still angry with them for their abandonment and refuses to help them. The quartet convince him by leaping in and out of his body during an important meeting and threatening further public humiliation until Thomas reluctantly agrees to help in order to finally be rid of them.

Thomas is able to locate Penny's two daughters, but not her youngest child Billy, who was adopted after Penny died. Milo uses Thomas's body to break into a house, steal back the stamp album, and return it to its now-adult owner. However, after the burglary, a nervous Thomas encounters a police sergeant (who is ticketing his illegally parked car) and accidentally gets himself arrested, forcing Anne to bail him out. Harrison uses Thomas's body to sing the national anthem at a B.B. King concert, after which Thomas is arrested again by the same police sergeant, who Penny suddenly recognises as her son. Thomas tells Billy the location of his long-lost sisters, and Billy is so overcome that he lets Thomas go with a warning. Meanwhile, Anne, concerned with Thomas's recent bizarre behaviour, demands to know what's going on. When he is unable to tell her, she breaks up with him.

Finally, Thomas and Julia write a letter to Julia's boyfriend John in which she confesses her love for him, only to learn from a man now living in what was John's house that John died seven years before. At the same moment, the trolleybus returns to take Julia. Thomas protests that Julia's business is still unresolved, but, while Thomas is busy berating Hal, Julia realises that her true business is Thomas, who is making the same mistake with Anne that she made with John. Thomas promises her that he will tell Anne his true feelings before it is too late. Before leaving, Julia temporarily becomes solid again, allowing her to give Thomas a farewell hug. The trolleybus then departs.

Thomas invites Anne back to the arboretum, where he admits his fear of abandonment and his love for her. As a symbol of his trust, he gives her a heart-shaped keyring containing all his personal keys. Anne forgives him. The two dance under the night sky where four new stars twinkle to show that Penny, Julia, Harrison and Milo are finally at peace.

== Cast ==
- Robert Downey Jr. as Thomas Reilly
- Charles Grodin as Harrison Winslow
- Kyra Sedgwick as Julia
- Elisabeth Shue as Anne
- Tom Sizemore as Milo Peck
- David Paymer as Hal the Bus Driver
- Alfre Woodard as Penny Washington

In addition, B. B. King makes a cameo appearance as himself, while Bob Newhart's son, Robert, makes a brief appearance as his father performing on stage in 1959.

== Production ==
The film was shot on-location in San Francisco, California. from December 1, 1992, to March 18, 1993. Some of the locations featured in San Francisco include the Stockton Tunnel, The Convervatory of Flowers and the War Memorial Opera House. Parts of the film were also shot at Greenfield Ranch in Thousand Oaks, California. The scene with B. B. King was shot at the Wiltern Theater in Los Angeles.

== Release ==
Heart and Souls was released on August 13, 1993, in 1,275 theaters. It debuted at #6 at the box office, grossing $4,322,250 in its opening weekend; in its second weekend it landed at #8, grossing $2,803,655. The film went on to gross $16.5 million in its theatrical run.

== Reception ==
On Rotten Tomatoes the film has a score of 58% based on 24 reviews. The site's consensus states: "A charismatic array of character actors bring a lot of Heart to this supernatural comedy, but many will find that it heaps on the sentimentality where its Soul should be." On Metacritic it has a score of 56% based on reviews from 26 critics.

Janet Maslin of The New York Times wrote: "When the film announces, halfway through, that it will be devoting the rest of its running time to tying up these loose ends, the audience may as well give up the ghost."

Peter Travers of Rolling Stone wrote: "Heart and Souls breaks the gimmick jinx by blending laughs and tears into a magical fantasy...Downey shows an explosive talent for physical comedy, most memorably at a business meeting when a feminine spirit moves him and at a B.B. King concert when a shy Grodin uses him to sing the national anthem. The scene is a show stopper, highlighting a potently acted, buoyantly funny film that trades on emotion without making you gag on it."

Ty Burr of Entertainment Weekly wrote: "You may hate yourself for liking Heart and Souls, but at least you can take comfort in the fact that you've been had by professionals."

== Accolades ==
- Saturn Award for Best Actor - Robert Downey Jr.; Saturn Award Nominations for Supporting Actors - Charles Grodin and Tom Sizemore; Saturn Award Nominations for Supporting Actresses - Kyra Sedgwick and Alfre Woodard; Saturn Award Nomination for Best Director - Ron Underwood; Saturn Award Nomination for Best Writing - Brent Maddock, S.S. Wilson, Gregory Hansen, Erik Hansen; Saturn Award Nomination for Best Fantasy Film; Saturn Award Nomination for Best Music - Marc Shaiman; Saturn Award Nomination for Best Special Effects - Pacific Data Images and 4-Ward Productions

== See also ==
- Ghost Town
- List of films about angels
- List of ghost films
