= Short Circuit (1986 film) =

1986 film by John Badham

- Theatrical release poster
- Directed by: John Badham
- Written by: S. S. Wilson; Brent Maddock
- Produced by: David Foster; Lawrence Turman
- Starring: Ally Sheedy; Steve Guttenberg; Fisher Stevens; Austin Pendleton; G. W. Bailey
- Cinematography: Nick McLean
- Edited by: Frank Morriss
- Music by: David Shire
- Production companies: Producers Sales Organization; The Turman-Foster Company
- Distributed by: Tri-Star Pictures
- Release date: May 9, 1986
- Running time: 98 minutes
- Country: United States
- Language: English
- Budget: $15 million
- Box office: $40.7 million

Short Circuit is a 1986 American science fiction comedy film directed by John Badham and written by S. S. Wilson and Brent Maddock. The film centers on an experimental military robot that is struck by lightning and gains a human-like artificial intelligence, prompting it to escape its facility to learn more about the world. It stars Ally Sheedy, Steve Guttenberg, Fisher Stevens, Austin Pendleton, and G. W. Bailey; Tim Blaney is the voice of the robot Number 5.

Short Circuit was theatrically released in the United States and Canada on May 9, 1986, by Tri-Star Pictures. Despite receiving mixed reviews from critics, the film was a box office success, grossing $40.7 million against a $15 million budget. It earned three nominations, including Best Science Fiction Film, at the 14th Saturn Awards. The film's sequel, titled Short Circuit 2, was directed by Kenneth Johnson and was theatrically released on July 6, 1988.

== Plot ==
NOVA Laboratory robotics experts Newton Crosby and Ben Jabituya have developed a series of robotic soldiers called S.A.I.N.T. (Strategic Artificially Intelligent Nuclear Transport) for the U.S. military to use in Cold War operations, though they would rather seek peaceful applications of the robots. After a live demonstration for the military, one of the units, S.A.I.N.T. Number 5, is struck by lightning arcing through the lab's power grid. This scrambles the robot's programming and gives him rudimentary sentience, after which he escapes from the NOVA facility.

The robot wanders into Astoria, Oregon and is found by Stephanie Speck, an animal caregiver, who mistakes him for an alien. She takes the robot into her home, where the variety of stimuli (which the robot refers to as "input") allows him to improve his cognitive and language skills and begin to develop a personality. As she continues to help the curious robot learn about the world, Stephanie eventually discovers Number 5 was built by NOVA, and contacts them about their lost robot. NOVA's CEO, Dr. Howard Marner, orders Crosby and Ben to recover Number 5 so they can disassemble and rebuild it. While waiting for NOVA to arrive, Number 5 learns about death when he accidentally crushes a grasshopper and concludes that he will die if NOVA disassembles him. Despite escaping in Stephanie's food truck, NOVA uses a tracking device connected to Number 5 to corner and deactivate him for return to the facility. During transport, Number 5 reactivates himself, removes the tracking device, and flees back to Stephanie. NOVA meanwhile offers a bounty on Number 5's return, which in turn attracts the unwanted attention of Stephanie's abusive ex-boyfriend, Frank. He turns up at her house to try and capture Number 5, who defeats him and dismantles his car. Knowing that Frank will alert NOVA and the authorities, Stephanie and Number 5 go on the run in search of Crosby, to convince him of Number 5's sentience.

Due to Number 5's unusual behavior, Crosby tries to convince Marner that something has changed with Number 5's programming and that they should take care not to damage it in their recovery efforts so that he can examine them later. Marner instead sends three S.A.I.N.T. prototypes (Numbers 1, 2, and 3) and his egomaniac security chief Captain Skroeder, who has an innate distrust of the robots, to capture Number 5 by force, ignoring Crosby's concerns. Number 5 outwits the other robots and reprograms their personalities to act like The Three Stooges, allowing him to escape. Number 5 kidnaps Crosby, takes him to Stephanie, and convinces Crosby of his sentience. They find that Skroeder has called in the United States Army to destroy the rogue robot. To protect his friends, Number 5 leads the Army away and appears to be destroyed by a helicopter missile.

Stephanie is devastated as Skroeder's men scrounge the remains of Number 5 as trophies, prompting Crosby to resign from NOVA and drive away with Stephanie in the NOVA van. Marner is enraged over the loss of his research and the $11 million investment; he fires Skroeder on the spot for insubordination. However, Crosby and Stephanie are soon surprised to discover that Number 5 hid under the van, having assembled a decoy of himself from spare parts to mislead the military. Crosby suggests taking Number 5 to a secluded ranch in Montana, where there will be much "input" for the robot, and Stephanie agrees to come with them. As they drive off, Number 5 asserts that his name should now be "Johnny 5" based on the El DeBarge song "Who's Johnny" which had been playing on the van's radio.

== Cast ==
- Ally Sheedy as Stephanie Speck, who befriends Number 5
- Steve Guttenberg as Newton Crosby, Ph.D., the designer of the prototypes
- Fisher Stevens as Ben Jabituya, Crosby's assistant
- Austin Pendleton as Dr. Howard Marner, President of Nova Robotics
- G. W. Bailey as Captain Skroeder, Nova's Chief of Security
- Brian McNamara as Frank, Stephanie's abusive ex-boyfriend
- Marvin J. McIntyre as Duke, one of Nova's security officers
- John Garber as Otis, one of Nova's security officers
- Penny Santon as Mrs. Cepeda, Stephanie's housekeeper
- Vernon Weddle as General Washburne
- Barbara Tarbuck as Senator Mills
- John Badham as a cameraman (uncredited)
- Jack Angel as the voice of Number 1 (uncredited)
- Cam Clarke as the voice of Number 2 (uncredited)
- Don Messick as the voice of Number 3 (uncredited)
- Seth Peters as the voice of Number 4 (uncredited)
- Tim Blaney as voice of Number 5, later nicknamed "Johnny 5"

== Production ==
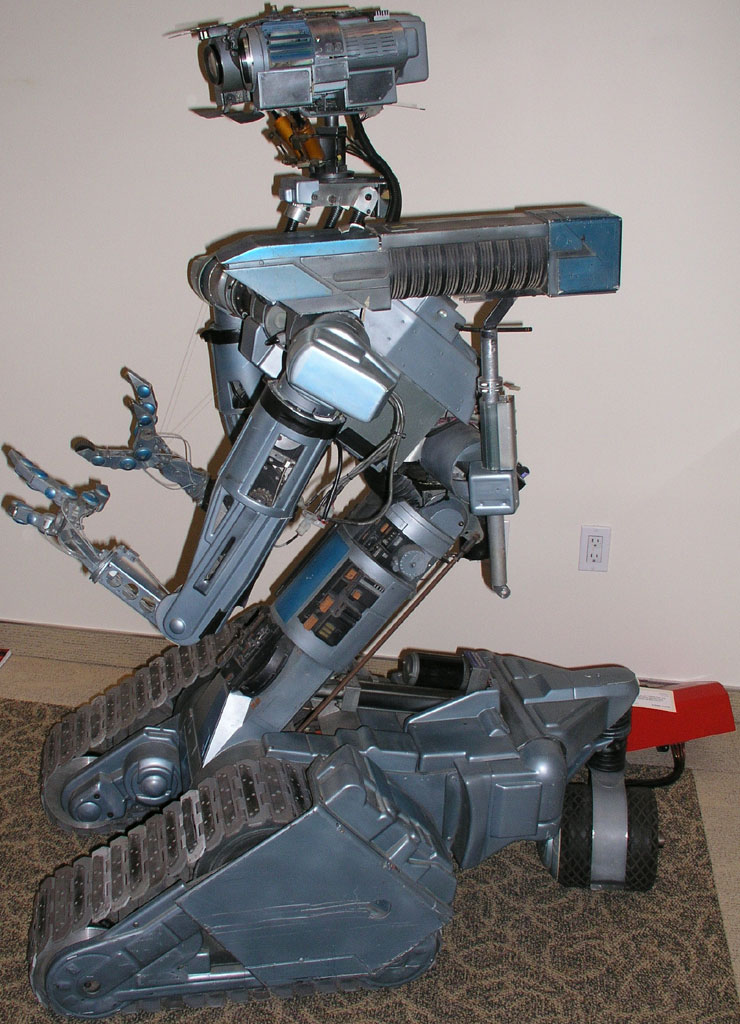
The original Number 5 robot from the film. It is a tracked semi-humanoid robot.

This film was conceived after the producers distributed an educational video about a robot to various colleges. Studying other films with a prominent robot cast (like the Star Wars series) for inspiration, they decided to question human reactions to a 'living' robot, on the premise that no one would initially believe its sentience. According to the DVD commentary, Number 5 was the most expensive part of the film, requiring several different versions to be made for different sequences. Almost everything else in the film was relatively inexpensive, allowing them to allocate as much money as they needed for the robot character.

The inspiration for the design of number 5 came from Douglas Trumbull's "Showscan" short entitled "LETS GO" which featured a robot named PAL that was designed by Eric Allard, Steven Spielberg saw the short and told Badham to contact Allard for the robot construction in the film.

Number 5 was designed by Syd Mead, the "visual futurist" famous for his work on Blade Runner and Tron. Although Mead's design was greatly influenced by the sketches of Allard, the Robotics Supervisor was credited for "realizing" the robots. Director John Badham named Allard "the most valuable player" on the film. Most of the arm movements of Number 5 were controlled by a "telemetry suit", carried on the puppeteer's upper torso. Each joint in the suit had a separate sensor, allowing the puppeteer's arm and hand movements to be transferred directly to the machine. He was also voiced in real-time by his puppeteer, the director believing that it provided for more realistic interaction between the robot and the other actors than putting in his voice in post-production, although a few of his lines were re-dubbed later.

During Stephanie's impromptu news interview, Badham makes a cameo appearance as the news cameraman. The sequence in the film depicting Number 5 watching the movie Saturday Night Fever (and imitating John Travolta's dance moves) is an in-joke, as Badham also directed Saturday Night Fever.

Fisher Stevens said that when he was originally hired to play Ben Jabituya, the character was not intended to be Indian. Stevens was fired and replaced by Bronson Pinchot at one point, but then Pinchot left to do the sitcom Perfect Strangers, and Stevens was rehired. To portray the role he had to grow a beard, dye his hair black, darken his skin with makeup, turn his blue eyes brown with contact lenses, speak with an East Indian accent and "walk hunched over like a cricket player". In 2015, Aziz Ansari had a cordial discussion with Stevens over the role, with Ansari saying he did not view Stevens as a bad guy or someone who played Ben as a tired stereotype, and Stevens saying (with Ansari's agreement) that a present-day version of the role would be played by an actor who had an Indian or a South Asian background.

In 2009, Austin Pendleton, who had gone to college with Badham, stated "some stuff was cut out of my part in [Short Circuit]. And also the two leading roles were cast with really talented, attractive people who were not right for the parts. [The] script was just 'heartbreakingly' beautiful to read. And now it's a nice little slightly bland kids' movie. Nothing exactly wrong with it. Those two people who are in the leads are good, very likable, easy-to-work-with people, and have done some good work; they just weren't those people that were written in the script. And I said to John when it was about to open, 'Why did you cast them?' And he said, 'That was what the studio insisted on'. And it sort of ended the discussion. I said, 'Okay'. The film kind of works, but again, it was going to have been quite a beautiful film". According to Pendleton, the role Guttenberg ended up playing "...was a person who could not relate to other human beings, so he poured all that into the creation of the robot. Well, Steve, he's a lovely guy, and I think he's talented. I think he has a real sharp—especially in those days when they were hiring him all the time—he had a wonderful kind of charisma. Very easy, but utterly social. He's just so very engaging and open with people. He's wonderful to be on a movie with. He's just a real colleague. But he's just that way with people. He does not bring onscreen with him the problem that the character in that movie has. So you hear that he's shy and everything, but it's more like a convention than anything else. The perfect person for the role, 20 years earlier, would have been Dustin Hoffman. That thing that Dustin brought to The Graduate that a more affable actor would not have."

Guttenberg and Bailey had previously worked together on the Police Academy series of films.

== Soundtrack ==
Although no soundtrack album was released at the time, El DeBarge had a chart hit with the single "Who's Johnny (Theme from Short Circuit)". Released in 1986 on the Gordy label, the single was used for the film and reached number three on the Billboard Hot 100 and number one on the Hot R&B Singles chart. In 2008, Varèse Sarabande released David Shire's score as part of their CD Club series of limited edition releases. The DeBarge song was not included or mentioned in the liner notes. The last three tracks are source music.

Short Circuit [Original Motion Picture Soundtrack]
No.	Title	Length
1.	"Main Title"	2:13
2.	"The Quickening/Off The Bridge"	2:44
3.	"Discovering Number 5/Sunrise"	4:32
4.	"Grasshopper/Joy(less) Ride"	4:43
5.	"The Attack/Coming To"	3:47
6.	"Road Block/Bathtub/Robot Battle"	2:42
7.	"Getaway/Hello, Bozos"	2:41
8.	"Night Scene/Joke Triumph"	4:17
9.	"Danger, Nova/Escape Attempt/Aftermath"	3:48
10.	"Finale/End Title: "Come And Follow Me" – Max Carl and Marcy Levy"	5:04
11.	"Source Music: Rock"	3:39
12.	"Source Music: Bar"	1:51
13.	"Source Music: The Three Stooges"	1:08
Total length:		43:09

=== Personnel ===
- Max Carl - vocals, keyboards (track 10)
- Marcy Levy - vocals (track 10)

== Reception ==
=== Critical response ===
On the review aggregator website Rotten Tomatoes, 62% of 39 critics' reviews are positive, with an average rating of 5.4/10. The website's consensus reads: "Amiable and good-natured but also shallow and predictable, Short Circuit is hardly as deep or emotionally resonant as E.T. — though Johnny Five makes for a charming robot protagonist." Metacritic, which uses a weighted average, assigned the film a score of 50 out of 100, based on 12 critics, indicating "mixed or average" reviews. Audiences polled by CinemaScore gave the film an average grade of "A–" on an A+ to F scale.

Vincent Canby of The New York Times described Short Circuit as "a cheerful, inoffensive fantasy in which such attractive live actors as Steve Guttenberg and Ally Sheedy play second fiddle to machinery" and wrote that "the movie, which has the clean, well-scrubbed look of an old Disney comedy, is nicely acted." A reviewer for Variety called the film "a hip, sexless sci-fi sendup" and praised the writers for "some terrific dialog that would have been a lot less disarming if not for the winsome robot and Sheedy's affection for it." The Sun-Sentinel gave Short Circuit a good review, saying: "Number Five is the real star of this energetic film. Sheedy, Guttenberg and company are just supporting players". Roger Ebert, writing in the Chicago Sun-Times, rated Short Circuit 1.5 out of 4 stars and called it "too cute for its own good". Colin Greenland reviewed Short Circuit for issue 85 of White Dwarf and stated that "there are good jokes, but the picture's so bland they hardly count".

=== Box office ===
Short Circuit debuted at No. 1 in the US box office with a studio-reported weekend gross of $5.3 million, although independent sources suggested that the gross was inflated and more likely between $4.5 and $4.725 million. It grossed a domestic total of $40.7 million, ranking it 21st for 1986 in the United States; it performed slightly better than other hits of that year, such as Pretty in Pink, The Fly, Three Amigos, Little Shop Of Horrors, and About Last Night. By 1987, Short Circuit had grossed $100 million in worldwide theatrical and ancillary revenues (not including merchandise). The film was reportedly the top home video rental of 1987.

=== Accolades ===
Year	Award	Category	Recipient(s)	Result	Ref.
1987	Saturn Awards	Best Science Fiction Film	Short Circuit	Nominated	
1987	Saturn Awards	Best Director	John Badham	Nominated	
1987	Saturn Awards	Best Special Effects	Syd Mead; Eric Allard	Nominated	
1987	BMI Film & TV Awards	BMI Film Music	David Shire	Won	

=== Whitewashing criticism ===
In the years after its release, the film has drawn criticism for casting Stevens, a Jewish actor, to play the Indian character Ben, in brownface makeup. American comedian Aziz Ansari has cited the casting as an example of whitewashing in Hollywood. Both Badham and Stevens expressed regret for the decision. In a 2021 interview, Stevens said, "It definitely haunts me. I still think it's a really good movie, but I would never do that part again. The world was a different place in 1986, obviously". In another interview that same year, Badham said that the character had been written as American. Inspired by a scene in Beverly Hills Cop (1984) in which a French shop assistant is rude to his American customers, Badham made the switch, finding humor in the "culture mismatch". He added that had the character been originally conceived as Indian, an Indian or Indian-American actor would have been cast, and said, "That was an oversight on our part, but we never intended to make fun of the character of Ben".

== Franchise ==
=== 1987 video game ===
A 1987 video game based on the 1986 film of the same name was published and developed by Ocean Software for ZX Spectrum, Commodore 64 and Amstrad CPC.

=== 1988 sequel ===
A sequel, titled Short Circuit 2, was directed by Kenneth Johnson and was theatrically released on July 6, 1988. There was a script for a possible third film, where Johnny 5 went to college, that was written in 1989 and rewritten in 1990 but was found unsatisfactory by the producers, and the project was scrapped and canceled. Johnny 5 answered questions in character in a videotaped interview with Bobbie Wygant, a reporter based in Dallas, to promote Short Circuit 2.

=== 1991 TV short film ===
A 1991 24-minute educational TV short film, titled Auto Theft: Hot Cars, Cold Facts, takes place after Short Circuit 2. The TV short film stars Gina Revarra as Lisa, John Hugh as Officer Dave, Donald Bishop as Marner and Russell Turner (the TV short film's director, producer and co-editor) as the voice of Johnny 5.

=== Planned remake ===
On April 4, 2008, Variety reported that Dimension Films had acquired the rights to remake the original film. Dan Milano had been hired to write the script, and David Foster to produce it. Foster said that the robot's appearance would not change. Later in October 2009, reports circulated that Steve Carr would direct the remake and that the film's plot would involve a boy from a broken family befriending the Number 5 robot. Carr left the project on August 4, 2011, and Tim Hill was reportedly hired to direct. On November 13, 2020, it was announced that Spyglass Media Group is set to remake the 1986 film, with Project X Entertainment's James Vanderbilt, Paul Neinstein, and William Sherak producing and Rehab Entertainment's John W. Hyde returning as executive producer alongside Terissa Kelton. The company hired the writing team of Eduardo Cisneros and Jason Shuman to put a Latin twist on the screenplay for the film.
