= Brent Maddock =

American film director, producer and screenwriter

- Born: United States
- Occupations: Screenwriter, producer, director

Brent Maddock is an American screenwriter, producer and film director who has worked with S. S. Wilson on several high-profile projects such as Short Circuit (1986), Batteries Not Included (1987), Tremors (1990) and Wild Wild West (1999). Maddock is a founding partner of Stampede Entertainment.

== Filmography ==
Year	Title	Writer	Producer	Other	Director	Notes
1975	Recorded Live	No	No	Yes	S. S. Wilson	Short film, frame clicking & tape pulling
1980	Deer in the Works	Yes	No	No	Ron Underwood	Short film
1980	The Reference Section	Yes	No	No	Ron Underwood	Short film
1986	Short Circuit	Yes	No	No	John Badham	
1987	Batteries Not Included	Yes	No	No	Matthew Robbins	
1988	Short Circuit 2	Yes	No	No	Kenneth Johnson	
1988	The Land Before Time	No	No	Yes	Don Bluth	Story consultant
1990	Tremors	Yes	Yes	No	Ron Underwood	
1990	Ghost Dad	Yes	No	No	Sidney Poitier	
1993	Heart and Souls	Yes	No	Yes	Ron Underwood	Writer song "Mr. Hug-A-Bug"
1996	Tremors 2: Aftershocks	Yes	Executive	No	S. S. Wilson	Direct-to-video
1999	Wild Wild West	Yes	No	No	Barry Sonnenfeld	
2001	Tremors 3: Back to Perfection	Story	No	Yes	Himself	Direct-to-video (first and only directing credit)
2003	Tremors	Yes	Executive	Yes	Various	Developer and executive producer 13 episodes (Wrote 7 episodes)
2004	Tremors 4: The Legend Begins	Story	Executive	No	S. S. Wilson	Direct-to-video
