= City of Crime =

City of Crime may refer to:

- Batman: City of Crime, a 2005-2006 Batman comic book story arc
- "City of Crime (song)," a song performed by Dan Aykroyd and Tom Hanks from the 1987 film Dragnet

== See also ==
- Whispering City, also known as Crime City, a 1947 film
- City Crimes, an 1840 novel
