= Lois Nettleton =

American actress (1927–2008)

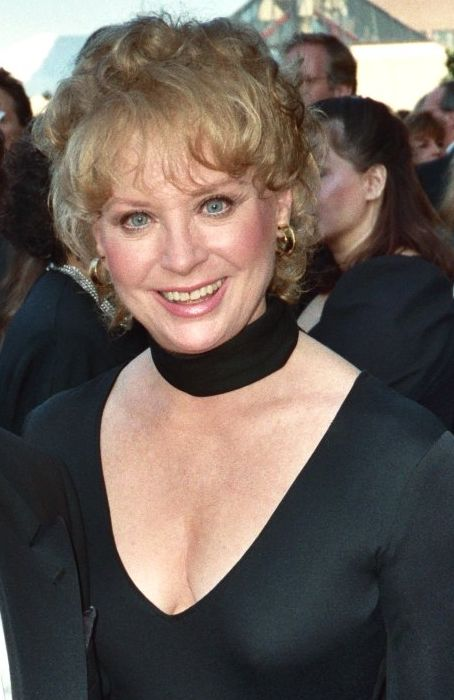
- Lois Nettleton at the 1989 Emmy Awards
- Born: Lois June Nettleton; August 16, 1927; Oak Park, Illinois, U.S.
- Died: January 18, 2008 (aged 80); Woodland Hills, California, U.S.
- Resting place: Saint Raymond's Cemetery, Bronx, New York City
- Other name: Lydia Scott
- Education: Art Institute of Chicago
- Occupation: Actress
- Years active: 1949–2008
- Spouse: Jean Shepherd (m. 1960; div. 1967)

Lois June Nettleton (August 16, 1927 – January 18, 2008) was an American film, stage, radio and television actress. She received three Primetime Emmy Award nominations and won two Daytime Emmy Awards.

== Early life ==
Lois Nettleton was born on August 16, 1927, in Oak Park, Illinois, to Virginia and Edward L. Nettleton. She was also raised by her maternal aunt (Frank Konfrst II & Julia Konfrst). She grew up extremely close to her cousin, Frank Howard Konfrst III. They were inseparable up until about the age of 13. She attended Senn High School, where she was a classmate of Lee Stern, and Goodman School of Drama at the Art Institute of Chicago. She was crowned Miss Chicago of 1948 and became a semifinalist at the Miss America 1948 pageant. After performing to favorable reviews with Geraldine Page in repertory theatre at the New Lake Zurich Playhouse in 1946 and with the Woodstock Players the following year, her professional acting career began in 1949. She understudied Barbara Bel Geddes in the original Broadway production of Tennessee Williams' Cat on a Hot Tin Roof and appeared on television in a production of "Flowers from a Stranger" on Westinghouse Studio One on the CBS network in 1949.

== Career ==
=== Radio ===
Nettleton played Patsy in the soap opera The Brighter Day.

=== Television ===
Nettleton guest-starred on the television shows The Twilight Zone (episode "The Midnight Sun", 1961), Naked City, Route 66, Mr. Novak, The Alfred Hitchcock Hour (episode "The Dark Pool", 1963), The Eleventh Hour, Hawaii Five-O, Dr. Kildare, Twelve O'Clock High, The Fugitive, The F.B.I., Cannon, Bonanza, Gunsmoke, The Virginian and Daniel Boone. In 1973, she appeared on The Mary Tyler Moore Show as Lou Grant's boss. In 1975, she appeared as Delonia Cantrell in season 3, episode 18 (Barbary House) and episode 19 (Flight To Orion) of Kung Fu (1972 TV series). She appeared in the pilot episode of The Eddie Capra Mysteries in 1978 and in hit TV miniseries such as Washington: Behind Closed Doors and Centennial. In 1987, Nettleton portrayed Penny Vanderhof Sycamore on the TV series version of the Kaufman and Hart comedy play You Can't Take It with You with Harry Morgan and Richard Sanders.

Nettleton was a regular celebrity guest on the game show Pyramid from the 1970s through 1991.

She won two Emmy Awards: the first for her role as Susan B. Anthony in the television film The American Woman: Profiles in Courage (1977), and the second for "A Gun for Mandy" (1983), an episode of the religious anthology Insight. She received an Emmy Award nomination for Outstanding Guest Actress in a Comedy Series for the Golden Girls episode "Isn't It Romantic?" She also received Emmy nominations for her work in the TV movie Fear on Trial (1975) (Outstanding Supporting Actress in a Miniseries or Special) and for a recurring role in the series In the Heat of the Night in 1989 (Outstanding Supporting Actress in a Drama Series). Nettleton appeared in a 2006 Christmas TV movie special on Hallmark Channel titled The Christmas Card.

=== Film ===
Nettleton appeared in several Hollywood feature films. Her first prominent role came in Period of Adjustment (1962), an adaptation of a Tennessee Williams play, as a woman in a troubled marriage.

=== Stage ===
A lifetime member of the Actors Studio, Nettleton made her Broadway debut in the 1949 production of Dalton Trumbo's play The Biggest Thief in Town. She appeared in a short-lived off-Broadway production of Look Charlie, which was written by her future husband, humorist Jean Shepherd. It opened for three performances in late December 1958 and closed after several more the following February.

Nettleton received critical praise for her performance as Blanche DuBois in a 1973 revival of A Streetcar Named Desire. She was nominated for a Tony Award for her performance as Amy in a 1976 revival of They Knew What They Wanted. Her other stage credits include Broadway productions of Darkness at Noon and Silent Night, Lonely Night. She continued to act on the stage into her seventies. Her final stage performance was in the 2004 off-Broadway play How to Build a Better Tulip.

=== Voice acting ===
Nettleton appeared in episodes of the CBS Radio Mystery Theater. In her later years, she performed voice roles as Athena in Herc's Adventures and as Maleficent in House of Mouse and Mickey's House of Villains.

== Personal life and death ==
Nettleton was the first caller to Jean Shepherd's late-night radio program on WOR, later becoming his third wife. She was a regular guest, known to the audience as "the listener". They married on December 3, 1960, in Tarrytown, New York but divorced in 1967.

Nettleton made her last public appearance in August 2007 at a Twilight Zone convention in Hasbrouck Heights, New Jersey. On January 18, 2008, she died in Woodland Hills, California at the age of 80, from lung cancer.

== In popular culture ==
A highly fictionalized version of Nettleton appears in James Ellroy's 2021 novel Widespread Panic and in his 2023 novel The Enchanters.

== Filmography ==
=== Movies ===
Year	Title	Role	Notes
1957	A Face in the Crowd	Mr. Mason's Nurse	Uncredited
1962	Period of Adjustment	Dorothea Bates	
1963	Come Fly with Me	Hilda 'Bergie' Bergstrom	
1964	Mail Order Bride	Annie Boley	
1968	The Bamboo Saucer	Anna Karachev	
1969	The Good Guys and the Bad Guys	Mary	
1970	Pigeons	Mildred	
1970	Dirty Dingus Magee	Prudence Frost	
1971	The Bull of the West	Mary Justin	
1972	The Honkers	Linda Lathrop	
1975	The Man in the Glass Booth	Miriam Rosen	
1976	Echoes of a Summer	Ruth Striden	
1981	Deadly Blessing	Louisa Stohler	
1981	Soggy Bottom, U.S.A.	Molly	
1982	Butterfly	Belle Morgan	
1982	The Best Little Whorehouse in Texas	Dulcie Mae	
1994	Mirror, Mirror II: Raven Dance	Sister Marion	
2002	Mickey's House of Villains	Maleficent	Voice, video

=== Television ===
Year	Title	Role	Notes
1949–1956	Studio One in Hollywood	Bertha Randall / Mona	3 Episodes: "Flowers from a Stranger", "The Willow Cabin", "An Incident of Love"
1953	Man Against Crime	Ethel	1 Episode: "Murder Mountain"
1954	Captain Video and His Video Rangers		1 Episode: "The Enemy from Within"
1954–1957	The Brighter Day	Patsy Dennis	
1955–1958	Camera Three	Emily Dickinson / Akulina	3 Episodes: "The Forty-Niners", "The Rendezvous", "Emily Dickinson: Portrait of a Poet"
1956	The Big Story	Jean	1 Episode: "Ex-Convict"
1958	Armstrong Circle Theatre		2 Episodes: "The Mummy Complex", "Accused of Murder"
1958	Kraft Theatre	Beth / Sarah	2 Episodes: "Now Will You Try for Murder?", "Presumption of Innocence"
1958	Decoy	Lois Bergen	2 Episodes: "Deadly Corridor", "Ladies Man"
1959	Meet Me in St. Louis	Lucille Ballard	TV movie
1959	Brenner		1 Episode: "One of Our Own"
1959	The United States Steel Hour	Jan Livingston	1 Episode: "Seed of Guilt"
1959	True Story	Sue Richards	1 Episode: "12 September 1959"
1959	Summer of Decision	Receptionist	TV movie
1959	Captain David Grief	Rosita Molina	1 Episode: "The Gun Runner"
1960	Startime		1 Episode: "Mr. Arcularis"
1960	Dow Hour of Great Mysteries	Laura / Anne Catherick	1 Episode: "The Woman in White"
1960	The Play of the Week	Mary / Abigail Sarclet	2 Episodes: "Duet for Two Hands", "Emmanuel"
1960–1962	Naked City	Sara / Marie Marianni / Fran Burney / Merissa Mori	4 Episodes: "Debt of Honor", "To Dream Without Sleep", "Show Me the Way to Go Home", "A Run for the Money"
1961	Encounter	Lise	1 Episode: "The Neighbour"
1961	Great Ghost Tales		1 Episode: "Mr. Arcularis"
1961	The Twilight Zone	Norma	1 Episode: "The Midnight Sun"
1961–1963	Route 66	Isabelle / Jahala West / Susan	3 Episodes: "The Opponent"; "Some of the People, Some of the Time"; "Suppose I Said I Was the Queen of Spain"
1961, 1967	Gunsmoke	Amy Todd / Nina Sharkey	2 Episodes: "Nina's Revenge", "The Returning"
1962	The DuPont Show of the Week	Jennifer Graham	1 Episode: "The Shadowed Affair"
1963	The Alfred Hitchcock Hour	Dianne Castillejo	Season 1 Episode 29: "The Dark Pool"
1963	The Eleventh Hour	Ruth	1 Episode: "Oh, You Shouldn't Have Done It"
1963	East Side/West Side	Ann Severson	1 Episode: "No Hiding Place"
1963–1964	The Nurses	Ella Johnson / Molly Kane	2 Episodes: "The Guilt of Molly Kane", "A Messenger to Everyone"
1964–1965	Dr. Kildare	Lisa Dowling / Hildy Pochek	2 Episodes: "Speak Not in Angry Whispers"; "My Name Is Lisa, and I Am Lost"
1964–1966	The Fugitive	Marcia Stone / Susan Cartwright / Lucey Russell	3 Episodes: "Man on a String", "In a Plain Paper Wrapper", "Death Is the Door Prize"
1965	Mr. Novak	Jean Corcoran	1 Episode: "Where Is There to Go, Billie, But Up?"
1965	12 O'Clock High	Susan Nesbit	1 Episode: "Show Me a Hero, I'll Show You a Bum"
1966	Bonanza	Elizabeth Ann Clauson	2 Episodes: "The Pursued: Part 1 & 2"
1966, 1970	The F.B.I.	Elizabeth Colling / Catherine Fossburg	2 Episodes: "Vendetta", "The Innocents"
1967	Accidental Family	Sue Kramer	16 episodes
1967	Valley of Mystery	Rita Brown	TV movie
1968	Daniel Boone	Sulie	1 Episode: "The Bait"
1968	Macbeth	Lady Macbeth	TV movie
1968	The Virginian	Suzanne Mayo	"The Wind of Outrage"
1968, 1970	The Name of the Game	Laura Garver / Ruth Prochek	2 Episodes: "The Taker", "All the Old Familiar Faces"
1969	Any Second Now	Nancy Dennison	TV movie
1969	The Outsider	April Endby	1 Episode: "Periwinkle Blue"
1969	Then Came Bronson	Barbara Timmons	1 Episode: "All the World and God"
1969	The Bold Ones: The New Doctors	Laura Michaels	1 Episode: "And Those Unborn"
1970	Bracken's World	Eva Sanders	1 Episode: "Nude Scene"
1970	Weekend of Terror	Sister Ellen	TV movie
1970–1976	Medical Center	Maj. Annie Malone / Katie Height / Dr. Annie Claymor	5 Episodes
1971	The Interns	Jeanne / Jenny	1 Episode: "Metamorphosis"
1971	The Forgotten Man	Anne Wilson	TV movie
1971	Terror in the Sky	Janet Turner	TV movie
1971	The Man and the City	Jennifer Wilson	1 Episode: "Jennifer"
1972	Women in Chains	Sandra Parker / Sally Porter	TV movie
1972	Night Gallery	Moira	1 Episode: "I'll Never Leave You - Ever/There Aren't Any More MacBanes"
1972	Cannon	Linda Dean	1 Episode: "The Shadow Man"
1973	The Mary Tyler Moore Show	Barbara Coleman	1 Episode: "What Do You Do When the Boss Says 'I Love You'"
1974	The ABC Afternoon Playbreak	Jennifer Clifton	1 Episode: "Last Bride of Salem"
1974	Movin' On	Karen	1 Episode: "Life Line"
1974	Marcus Welby, M.D.	Mary Anderson	1 Episode: "Child of Silence"
1974	Barnaby Jones	Ellen Blazeford	1 Episode: "Death on Deposit"
1975	Kung Fu	Delonia Cantrell	2 Episodes: "Danny Caine:Barbary House", "Flight to Orion"
1975	Petrocelli	Gloria	1 Episode: "A Night of Terror"
1975	Fear on Trial	Nan Claybourne	TV movie
1975	Hawaii Five-O	Chelsea Merriman	1 Episode: "Sing a Song of Suspence"
1976	The American Woman: Portraits of Courage	Susan B. Anthony	TV movie
1977	All That Glitters	Christina Stockwood	65 Episodes
1977	The Streets of San Francisco	Carolyn Blake	1 Episode: "Interlude"
1977	Washington: Behind Closed Doors	Linda Martin	6 Episodes
1978	The Eddie Capra Mysteries	Jessica Crowley	1 Episode: "Nightmare at Pendragon Castle"
1978–1979	Centennial	Maude Wendell	10 Episodes
1980	The Love Boat	Susan Stoddard	1 Episode: "Celebration/Captain Papa/Honeymoon Pressure"
1980	Tourist	Terry Carrell	TV movie
1982	Trapper John, M.D.	Janet Weems	1 Episode: "Three on a Mismatch"
1982	Insight	Joanna / Mandy	2 Episodes: "A Gun for Mandy", "So Little Time"
1984	Glitter	Sister Abigail	1 Episode: "A Minor Miracle"
1984–1991	Murder, She Wrote	Ginny Blanchard / Deidre French / Amelia	3 Episodes: "Lovers and Other Killers", "Mourning Among the Wisterias", "Terminal Connection"
1985	Finder of Lost Loves	Helen Sanderson	1 Episode: "From the Heart"
1985	Hotel	Cheryl Pomeroy	1 Episode: "Lost and Found"
1985	Brass	Claire Willis	TV movie
1986	Manhunt for Claude Dallas	Dee Pogue	TV movie
1986	The Golden Girls	Jean	1 Episode: "Isn't It Romantic?"
1986–1987	The Facts of Life	Noreen Stickle / Radio Voice	2 Episodes: "Ready or Not", "Ex Marks the Spot"
1987	Cagney & Lacey	Faith Dewey	1 Episode: "Divine Couriers"
1987–1988	You Can't Take It with You	Penny Vanderhof Sycamore	3 Episodes: "Like Mother, Like Son"; "The Trial of Martin Vanderhof"; "For Whom the Phone Rings"
1988	Mr. Belvedere	Barbara Collins	1 Episode: "Black Widow"
1988–1989	In the Heat of the Night	Joanne St. John	22 Episodes
1989	The Munsters Today	Ms. Jessica Bowton	1 Episode: "Eau de Munster"
1990	The Flash	Belle Crocker	1 Episode: "Ghost in the Machine"
1991	Full House	Nedra Donaldson	2 Episodes: "The Wedding: Part 1 & 2"
1993	Traveler's Rest	Joanne	TV Short
1994	Seinfeld	Mrs. Enright	1 Episode: "The Gymnast"
1994	Babylon 5	Daggair	1 Episode: "Soul Mates"
1995	The Cosby Mysteries	Mrs. Adams	1 Episode: "Last Tango"
1995	University Hospital	Sarah McCormick	1 Episode: "'Til Death Do Us Part"
1995	Coach	Lois	1 Episode: "Fool for Lunch"
1995	Baywatch Nights	Frances Sandreen	1 Episode: "Bad Blades"
1996	The Making of a Hollywood Madam	Katherine	TV movie
1996	Charlie Grace	Sarah McCormick	1 Episode: "I've Got a Secret"
1996–1998	General Hospital	Virginia Benson	Recurring role
1997	Spider-Man	Nora	2 Episodes: "Partners in Danger Chapter 1: Guilty", "Partners in Danger Chapter 2: The Cat"
1999	The Pretender	Gloria	1 Episode: "Risqué Business"
2001	Crossing Jordan	Evelyn	5 Episodes
2002	House of Mouse	Maleficent	1 Episode: "Halloween with Hades"
2006	The Christmas Card	Rosie Spelman	TV movie, (final film role)

=== Video games ===
Year	Title	Role
1997	Herc's Adventures	Athena
