= Delbert Mann =

American television and film director (1920–2007)

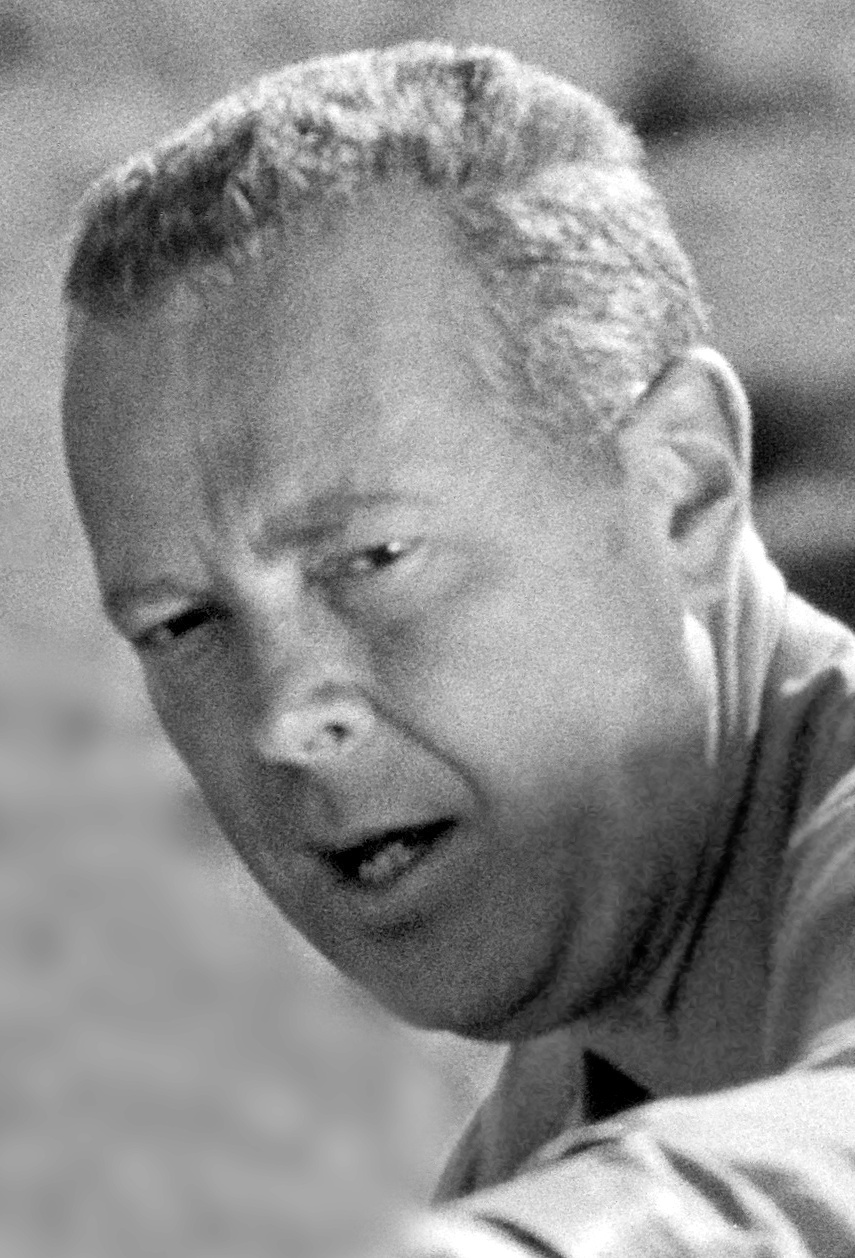
- Mann directing Heidi (1968)
- Born: Delbert Martin Mann Jr. January 30, 1920; Lawrence, Kansas, U.S.
- Died: November 11, 2007 (aged 87); Los Angeles, California, U.S.
- Education: Vanderbilt University (BA); Yale University (MFA)
- Occupation: Director
- Years active: 1949–1994
- Spouse: Ann Caroline Gillespie (m. 1942; died 2001)

Delbert Martin Mann Jr. (January 30, 1920 – November 11, 2007) was an American television and film director. He won the Academy Award for Best Director for the film Marty (1955), adapted from a 1953 teleplay which he had also directed. From 1967 to 1971, he was president of the Directors Guild of America. In 2002, he received the DGA's honorary life member award. Mann was credited to have "helped bring TV techniques to the film world."

== Early life and education ==
Delbert Martin Mann Jr. was born on January 30, 1920, in Lawrence, Kansas, to Delbert Mann Sr. and Ora (Patton) Mann (died 1961). His father taught sociology at the University of Kansas from 1920 to 1926. In 1926, the Manns left Lawrence and moved to Pennsylvania and then Chicago before finally settling in Nashville in 1931. There, his father continued to teach sociology at the Scarritt College for Christian Workers. His mother was also a schoolteacher.

Mann was head of his high school drama club when he met Fred Coe, the future television producer and director, who was leading a church-sponsored acting society. Coe would later figure prominently in Mann's career as a director. Coe would also serve as Mann's mentor. Mann studied political science in Vanderbilt University. He graduated there in 1941 with a bachelor's degree on political science. During World War II, Mann served with the Army Air Corps as a B-24 bomber pilot and then as an intelligence officer with the 8th Air Force stationed in England. Mann also attended the Yale School of Drama, where he earned a master's fine arts degree in directing.

== Career ==
=== Television ===
Mann took a directing job at the Town Theatre, a community playhouse in Columbia, South Carolina. Mann was affiliated with the Town Theatre from 1947 to 1949, before moving to New York to work with Coe in television. In 1949, at Coe's invitation, Mann joined him in New York, where he became a stage manager and assistant director at NBC. Within months, he became an alternating director of the anthology series, The Philco Television Playhouse.

Between 1949 and 1955, Mann directed more than 100 live television dramas. But even after turning to films, he returned to television and directed productions for Playhouse 90, Ford Star Jubilee and other dramatic television anthology series. He also directed more than two dozen films for television from the late 1960s to the early 1990s, including Heidi (1968), David Copperfield (1969), Jane Eyre (1970) and All Quiet on the Western Front (1979).

=== Film ===
In addition to Marty (1955), other films directed by Mann include The Bachelor Party (1957), Desire Under the Elms (1958), Separate Tables (1958), Middle of the Night (1959), The Dark at the Top of the Stairs (1960), The Outsider (1961), That Touch of Mink (1962), A Gathering of Eagles (1963), Dear Heart (1964), Fitzwilly (1967), Kidnapped (1971) and Night Crossing (1982).

== Personal life and death ==
Mann was married to Ann Caroline Gillespie from 1942 until her death by Alzheimer's disease in 2001. They had four children: Fred, David, Steven and Susan. Susan died in a car accident in 1976.

During the 1980s and 1990s, Mann served on the advisory board of the National Student Film Institute. He also served as honorary chairman of the institute for a one-year term.

On November 11, 2007, Mann died of pneumonia at the Cedars-Sinai Medical Center in Los Angeles, at age 87.

== Filmography ==
- Marty (1955)
- The Bachelor Party (1957)
- Desire Under the Elms (1958)
- Separate Tables (1958)
- Middle of the Night (1959)
- The Dark at the Top of the Stairs (1960)
- Lover Come Back (1961)
- The Outsider (1961)
- That Touch of Mink (1962)
- A Gathering of Eagles (1963)
- Dear Heart (1964)
- Quick, Before It Melts (1964)
- Mister Buddwing (1966)
- Fitzwilly (1967)
- The Pink Jungle (1968)
- Heidi (TV adaptation, 1968)
- David Copperfield (1969)
- Jane Eyre (TV adaptation, 1970)
- Kidnapped (1971)
- No Place to Run (1972 TV movie)
- The Man Without a Country (TV adaptation, 1973)
- Birch Interval (1976)
- Breaking Up (1978 TV movie)
- All Quiet on the Western Front (TV adaptation, 1979)
- Night Crossing (1982)
- The Gift of Love: A Christmas Story (1983 TV movie)
- Love Leads The Way (1984 Disney Channel original film)
- The Last Days of Patton (1986 made-for-television movie)
- Against Her Will: An Incident in Baltimore (1992 made-for-television movie)
- Incident in a Small Town (1994 made-for-television movie)
- Lily in Winter (1994 TV movie)

Directed Academy Award performances
Under Mann's direction, these actors have received Academy Award wins and nominations for their performances in their respective roles.

| Year | Performer | Film | Result |
Academy Award for Best Actor
| 1955 | Ernest Borgnine | Marty | Won |
| 1958 | David Niven | Separate Tables | Won |
Academy Award for Best Actress
| 1958 | Deborah Kerr | Separate Tables | Nominated |
Academy Award for Best Supporting Actor
| 1955 | Joe Mantell | Marty | Nominated |
Academy Award for Best Supporting Actress
| 1955 | Betsy Blair | Marty | Nominated |
| 1957 | Carolyn Jones | The Bachelor Party | Nominated |
| 1958 | Wendy Hiller | Separate Tables | Won |
| 1960 | Shirley Knight | The Dark at the Top of the Stairs | Nominated |
