= Lisa Aliff =

American beauty pageant winner, former actress

Lisa Lynn Aliff Greenleaf (born September 10, 1960) is an American beauty pageant winner and former actress.

== Early life, education, and career ==
Born in Roanoke, Virginia, Aliff attended Cave Spring High School. She graduated from college with a degree in early childhood education.

After being named Miss Roanoke Valley and being the runner-up in the 1981 Miss Virginia pageant, Aliff won the pageant in 1983. She then moved to Los Angeles and became an actress, appearing in a number of films and TV shows. Her first role was as Gail Kittredge on the TV show The Colbys, Season 1, Episode 24 "Checkmate" which aired on 22 May 1986. Over the next four years she also appeared in episodes of Cheers, Charles in Charge, Roomies, Valerie, Full House, Love and Betrayal, Who's the Boss?, Freddy's Nightmares, Dear John and Anything but Love. In 1986, she was cast as Alice Sycamore (née Vanderhof) in a starring role on You Can't Take It with You, a half-hour sitcom produced for syndication in 1986, but only four episodes of the show were aired.

In 1987, Aliff was the primary model for Sheer Indulgence pantyhose, appearing in two separate commercials which were broadcast nationally over the course of the next two years. The commercials were released upon the debut of the pantyhose, which were marketed as having department store quality but available in local markets at a lesser price.

Aliff worked with Dan Aykroyd and Tom Hanks in the movie Dragnet (1987). In 1994, Aliff was involved in a public divorce in which she said her husband falsely accused her of having an affair with Dan Aykroyd, so that her husband could obtain money through tabloid interviews and TV appearances. Her husband's allegation appeared in a two-page spread in the National Enquirer and he appeared on The Montel Williams Show. Aykroyd, who was married to another Miss Virginia, Donna Dixon, said the allegation was a "baseless fantasy" and a "flat lie".

Her last acting roles were in 1990. After returning to Roanoke, she taught elementary school, middle school and high school. As of 2015, she continued to be involved in the Miss Virginia pageant.

== Filmography ==
=== Movies ===
Year	Title	Role
1987	Dragnet	April
1988	Remote Control	Heroine
1989	Love and Betrayal	Patty
1989	Trained to Kill	Jessie Revels
1989	Damned River	Anne
1990	Playroom	Jenny

=== TV series ===
Year	Title	Role	Notes
1986	The Colbys	Gail Kittredge	1 episode
1987	Charles in Charge	Gina	1 episode
1987	Roomies	Melissa	pilot episode
1988	Valerie (The Hogan Family)	Julie Warren	1 episode)
1987-88	You Can't Take It with You	Alice Sycamore	3 broadcast episodes
1989	Cheers	Erin	1 episode
1989	Full House	Patty Fogerty	1 episode
1989	Who's the Boss?	Jill	1 episode
1989	Freddy's Nightmares	Kiki	1 episode
1990	Dear John	Ski Bunny	1 episode
1990	Anything but Love		
