= Pillsbury Doughboy =

Mascot for the Pillsbury Company

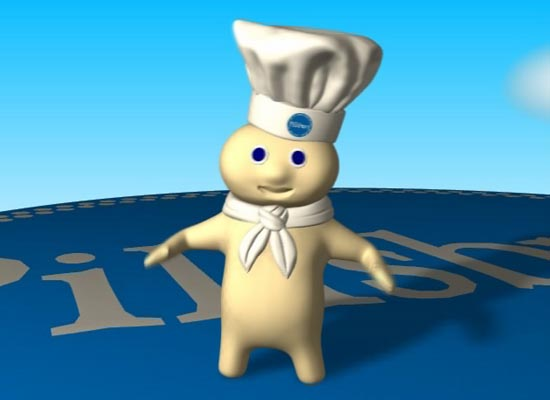
- First appearance: November 7, 1965
- Created by: Rudy Perz
- Voiced by: Paul Frees (1965–1986); Peter Hawkins (1976, UK); Jeff Bergman (1986–2014); Peter New (briefly); Fred Young (briefly); JoBe Cerny (2014–2024); Jeremy Geller (2018); Rich Orlow (2024–present)

In-universe information
- Full name: Poppin' Fresh
- Species: Anthropomorphic dough
- Gender: Male
- Title: Mascot of Pillsbury Company
- Family: See section below

Poppin' Fresh, more widely known as the Pillsbury Doughboy, is an advertising mascot for the Pillsbury Company, appearing in many of their commercials. Many commercials from 1965 until 2005 (together with some for GEICO between 2009 and 2017) ended with a human finger poking the Doughboy's belly. The Doughboy responds by giggling when his belly is poked (Hoo-Hoo!, or earlier on, a slight giggle "tee hee").

== History ==
The Pillsbury Doughboy was created by Rudolph "Rudy" Perz, a copywriter for Pillsbury's longtime advertising agency, Leo Burnett Company. Perz was sitting in his kitchen in the spring of 1965, under pressure to create an advertising campaign for Pillsbury's refrigerated dough product line (biscuits, dinner rolls, sweet rolls, and cookies). His copywriter, Carol H. Williams, imagined a living doughboy popping out of a Pillsbury refrigerated dough can and wrote the campaign, "Say Hello to Poppin' Fresh Dough". Williams was inducted into the American Advertising Federation Hall of Fame in 2017.

== Character ==
Poppin' Fresh was given a scarf, a chef's hat, and two big blue eyes to distinguish him from the rolls, as well as a faint blush and a soft, warm chuckle when poked on the belly. The Doughboy was originally designed by Milt Schaffer.

Stop-motion animator Jim Danforth was hired to animate him. The first Poppin' Fresh commercials aired in November 1965. Since then, Pillsbury has used Poppin' Fresh in more than 600 commercials for more than fifty of its products. He also appeared in a MasterCard's "Icons" commercial in 2005 during Super Bowl XXXIX, alongside the Jolly Green Giant, the Morton Salt Girl, the Vlasic stork, Charlie the Tuna, Mr. Peanut, Count Chocula, the Gorton's Fisherman, Chef Boyardee, and Mr. Clean; the ten merchandising icons are depicted as having dinner together. He has also appeared in ads for Got Milk?, Sprint, and GEICO. He also made a cameo appearance in the 1987 animated film The Puppetoon Movie. On February 9, 2025 during Super Bowl LIX, he appeared in an ad for Instacart alongside the Jolly Green Giant, Mr. Clean, Kool-Aid Man, Isaiah Mustafa (The "Old Spice Guy"), Chester Cheetah (Cheetos), the Energizer Bunny, Mountain Dew's PuppyMonkeyBaby, and the Heinz Wiener Dogs.

=== Voice actors ===
Over 50 different actors auditioned to be the first voice of the Pillsbury Doughboy, among them was Paul Winchell, who is best known for voicing Tigger in the Winnie the Pooh franchise. Ultimately, Paul Frees was the first actor chosen to be the voice of the Doughboy and would continue to provide his voice for 21 years. After Frees' death in 1986, Jeff Bergman took over the role, and held it until 2014. The high-pitched giggles were done by JoBe Cerny after 2014. In recent years, he has also been voiced by Peter New, Fred Young, and Jeremy Geller. In two advertisements made for the UK in 1976, British voice actor Peter Hawkins voiced the character. Currently, Rich Orlow voices the Doughboy.

== Animation ==
Perz originally conceived the Doughboy as a cartoon animated figure but changed his mind after seeing a stop-motion technique used in the opening credits for The Dinah Shore Show. Cascade Pictures was hired to create a three-dimensional Doughboy puppet at a cost of $16,000.

The Doughboy was brought to life with stop-motion animation, using foam rubber puppets with ball and socket armatures inside. The heads were typically made of resin, each with different mouth shapes or expression and animated using a replacement animation technique whereby the head would be swapped out frame-by-frame to match the mouth movements to the dialog. In 1992, the animation technique was changed to CGI animation, which continues to be used in new ads.

== Pillsbury family ==
In the 1970s, a Pillsbury Doughboy family was created and sold as dolls individually and in the form of various playsets.

Included in the family are:

- Poppin' Fresh
- Poppie Fresh, described by the Advertising Icon Museum as forming a couple with Poppin' Fresh beginning in the early 1970s .
- Granpopper and Granmommer (grandparents)
- Popper (boy) and Bun-Bun (baby, girl)
- Flapjack (dog) and Biscuit (cat)
- Uncle Rollie

== Trademark conflict ==
In May 2010, Pillsbury's lawyers served a cease and desist notice to My Dough Girl, LLC., a Salt Lake City, Utah cookie retailer. Some reported that an attorney for General Mills instructed the owner not to talk to the press.
