= JoBe Cerny =

American actor (1947–2026)

- Born: December 5, 1947; Cicero, Illinois, U.S.
- Died: October 30, 2026 (aged 78); Grayslake, Illinois, U.S.
- Other name: Jo Be Cerny
- Occupation: Actor
- Years active: 1979–2026

JoBe Cerny (December 5, 1947 – October 30, 2026) was an American actor. He is best known as the voice of the Pillsbury Doughboy, succeeding Paul Frees and Jeff Bergman, and as Procter & Gamble's spokesman for Cheer detergent, The Cheer Man.

== Life and career ==
In addition to appearing in advertising spots and commercials, Cerny appeared in numerous films, including Legally Blonde 2 (2003), Road to Perdition (2002), and My Best Friend's Wedding (1997). Cerny has also been featured in televised series and talk shows including Chicago Hope and Oprah, as well as appearing in numerous theatrical performances.

Cerny was the founder and president of Cerny/American Creative, a Chicago-based production company which offers creative services catering to film companies and advertising agencies, a weekly column writer for Screen Magazine and a recipient of The American Scene Award.

He received his bachelor's degree in Speech & Drama at Valparaiso University and his master's degree in Theater at Northwestern University.

Cerny died on October 30, 2026, at the age of 78.

== Filmography ==
Year	Title	Role	Notes
1979	Dreamer	Patterson	
1980	Somewhere in Time	2nd Day Desk Clerk, in 1912	
1987	Rent-a-Cop	Hotel Clerk No. 1	
1992	Prelude to a Kiss	Clerk	
1992	Mo' Money	Patrolman	
1996	Early Edition	Connor	Episode: "His Girl Thursday"
1997	Chicago Hope	FBI Agent David Greenblatt	Episode: "The Day of the Rope"
1997	My Best Friend's Wedding	Tailor	
1999	Love and Action in Chicago	Mr. Jensen	
2001	Novocaine	Pharmacist Wayne Ponze	
2002	Road to Perdition	Banker	
2003	Legally Blonde 2: Red, White & Blonde	House Clerk	
2013	Even and Odd	Mysterious voice	
2015	The Dreamers	Priest	Episode: "Nuptials"
2015	The Origins of Wit and Humor	Dr. Booregard Von Shriek	
2016	Margaret and the Moon	Grandpa	
