= Against Her Will: An Incident in Baltimore =

1992 film directed by Delbert Mann

- 1992 promotional image
- Genre: Drama
- Written by: Michael Norell; James Norell
- Directed by: Delbert Mann
- Starring: Walter Matthau; Harry Morgan; Susan Blakely; Brian Kerwin; Barton Heyman; Ariana Richards
- Music by: Allyn Ferguson
- Country of origin: United States
- Original language: English

Production
- Producer: Delbert Mann
- Production location: Pittsburgh
- Cinematography: Tony Imi
- Editor: Millie Moore
- Running time: 120 min.
- Production companies: RHI Entertainment; Procter & Gamble Productions

Original release
- Network: CBS
- Release: January 19, 1992

Related
- The Incident; Incident in a Small Town

Against Her Will: An Incident in Baltimore is a 1992 American made-for-television drama film directed by Delbert Mann and starring Walter Matthau, Harry Morgan and Susan Blakely. A sequel to The Incident (1990), it is the second of three television films featuring the characters Harmon Cobb and Judge Stoddard Bell. It was followed by a sequel, Incident in a Small Town, in 1994.

== Plot ==
In 1947, Small-town Colorado lawyer Harmon Cobb and his family move to Baltimore, where he becomes the law partner of his old adversary Judge Stoddard Bell. He goes against the State of Maryland, suing on behalf of Marika Papoulis, an institutionalized mental patient for release.

Cobb also struggles with the death of his son Harold in the previous film. Despite several years having passed since Harold's death in World War II, he is unable to accept his son's widow Billie beginning a new romance with Jack Adkins, a customer at the music shop at which she starts working.

== Cast ==
- Walter Matthau as Harmon Cobb
- Harry Morgan as Judge Stoddard Bell
- Susan Blakely as Billie Cobb
- Ariana Richards as Nancy Cobb
- Brian Kerwin as Jack Adkins
- Barton Heyman as Donald
- Norman Rose as Judge Gold
- Larry Keith as Dr. Obenland
- Michael Mantell as Dr. Friedman
- David Leary as District Attorney Yates
- Bridgit Ryan as Marika Papoulis
- Susan Chapek as Melina Vovakis
- Don Brockett as Judge Mulligan
- Bingo O'Malley as Judge Stoneburner
- John Hall as Young Lawyer

== Release ==
The film debuted on CBS on Sunday, January 19, 1992, in the CBS Sunday Movie slot. It was the 17th most-watched show of the week in the Nielsen ratings, with a 16.0 rating, and beat out ABC's movie offering She Woke Up (14.1 rating), which placed 27th.
