= Novocaine (2001 film) =

American comedy thriller by David Atkins

- Theatrical release poster
- Directed by: David Atkins
- Screenplay by: David Atkins
- Story by: David Atkins; Paul Felopulos
- Produced by: Paul Mones; Daniel M. Rosenberg
- Starring: Steve Martin; Helena Bonham Carter; Laura Dern
- Cinematography: Vilko Filac
- Edited by: Melody London
- Music by: Steve Bartek; Danny Elfman
- Distributed by: Artisan Entertainment (United States); Summit Entertainment (international)
- Release dates: September 8, 2001 (TIFF); November 16, 2001 (limited)
- Running time: 95 minutes
- Country: United States
- Language: English
- Budget: $6–8 million
- Box office: $2.5 million

Novocaine is a 2001 American black comedy thriller film written and directed by David Atkins and starring Steve Martin, Helena Bonham Carter, Laura Dern, Lynne Thigpen, and Elias Koteas. It was shot in the Chicago, Illinois area. The film premiered at the 2001 Toronto International Film Festival and went on to screen in limited release by Artisan Entertainment in the United States on November 16, 2001, with Summit Entertainment releasing in other territories. It was a box-office bomb and received mixed critic reviews.

== Plot ==
Dr. Frank Sangster is a dentist with a fairly pleasant but rather innocuous, ordinary, and uneventful life. His life takes an interesting turn when a beautiful and seductive new patient, Susan Ivey, comes to him seeking a root canal and a little pain relief.

On Susan's initial office visit, Frank schedules her for a root canal the very next day and offers her some Ibuprofen to address her pain in the meantime. Claiming that she is allergic to the offered medication, Susan requests a prescription for the addictive pain-killer Demerol. Frank provides the prescription, but only for five tablets. However, Susan changes the dosage from five tablets to fifty when she collects the medication from her pharmacist.

Susan arrives for her appointment twelve hours late, claiming to have mistaken the time. She seduces Frank, talking him into getting drunk and having sex with her. During the night, Susan steals all of Frank's narcotics. The next day, there is a DEA agent at Frank's office demanding to see the dentist's narcotics supply, because an 18-year-old has driven a car off a cliff under the influence of cocaine hydrochloride from a bottle registered to the dentist. Knowing that Susan has stolen his entire drug supply, Frank puts the agent off, saying he dispensed it all to patients. The agent leaves with the promise that if Frank fails to produce the empty containers in two days, the DEA will place him under arrest.

That night Frank goes to Susan's hotel room to demand the empty containers, threatening that he'll call the police if she doesn't provide them. Once again, she overrides his initial intentions and seduces him, with the result that they have sex and he spends the night with her.

The next day at his office, Frank is confronted violently by Susan's brother, Duane Ivey, who says to him: "Stay the hell away from my sister" and "I don't appreciate your threats". Duane ends the confrontation with, "I don't ever want to see you again, because if I do, goddamn it, I'm gonna hurt you."

That night, Frank returns to Susan's hotel room and, assuming that Susan is the form he sees in the bed, starts talking to her. The person under the blanket turns out to be not Susan but brother Duane, who leaps up and attacks Frank, attempting to strangle him. Frank takes scissors from a nearby desk and stabs Duane in the hand, impaling him and embedding the scissors. Frank flees, stopping off at a bar to calm down. On arriving at home, just minutes ahead of his girlfriend Jean, he finds Duane dead on the floor.

Police arrive on the scene to question Frank. Comically adding to Frank's distress and anxiety is actor Lance Phelps, a hack actor doing research for a role, and permitted by the police to question Frank at aggressive levels that cause Frank heightened discomfort. After the police depart, Frank tells Jean about the whole ordeal.

A while later, Frank is arrested for the murder of Duane Ivey based on finding Frank's teeth marks on the body - that someone else put there after killing Duane. After Frank breaks free, all of Chicago is on the lookout for him. He goes to his office in the night, only to find his brother Harlan lying dead.

At this point, it is revealed that Frank's girlfriend Jean is behind all of the killing. Jean had been conspiring with Harlan, with whom she'd been having an affair, to use Susan to frame Frank for selling drugs so she could take full control of the company she and Frank had started together. However, Duane came along with Susan, which was not part of the plan, and Jean ended up killing him, using Frank's dentures to make the bite marks. Unfortunately for Harlan, her plan was to eventually kill him as well with the shotgun to tie up all loose ends and make it appear that Frank killed him after Duane.

Realizing he'll never be free without starting over, Frank pulls out all of his dead brother's teeth, as well as all of his own. Frank uses his dental skills to place his own teeth into his dead brother's skull and then sets fire to the dental office with Harlan's corpse, replete with replaced teeth, left inside. Frank and Susan, now lovers, escape to France, where they live happily ever after in a little cottage in the countryside.

Meanwhile, Jean's attempts to frame Frank fall apart. Unbeknownst to her, Harlan was playing with a medical video camera while he was shot and the recovered footage shows Jean firing the shotgun at the camera holder but fails to show it was Harlan who was shot. Therefore, the police wrongly assume that Jean shot Frank and arrest her.

== Cast ==
- Steve Martin as Dr. Frank Sangster
- Helena Bonham Carter as Susan Ivey
- Laura Dern as Jean Noble
- Elias Koteas as Harlan Sangster
- Scott Caan as Duane Ivey
- Lynne Thigpen as Pat
- JoBe Cerny as Pharmacist Wayne Ponze
- Preston Maybank as Melvin Gelding, DEA Agent
- Keith David as Detective Larry Lunt
- Len Bajenski as Trooper Jarvis
- Kevin Bacon as Lance Phelps (uncredited)

== Production ==
Screenwriter David Atkins wrote the screenplay while working in the dental practices of his father and brothers. "I was looking for an everyman kind of character, and I just thought a dentist is a perfect everyman. I find dentists to be very sympathetic, actually. They know that people don't jump up and down with excitement when they have to go see a dentist, yet they welcome people into their offices, always with a smile. Then they lay them down in their chairs and take away the pain," said Atkins.

The film was shot in Chicago over 32 days, with additional location shooting done in Cedarburg and Lake Geneva, Wisconsin.

This was the second movie where Steve Martin plays an abusive dentist, the last was in the 1986 film adaptation of the Broadway musical Little Shop of Horrors as Orin Scrivello, DDS.

== Reception ==
Roger Ebert of the Chicago Sun-Times awarded the film three out of four stars and appreciated the film's screwball and film noir elements, declaring its "loopholes" forgivable for a comedy. The Los Angeles Times review had high praise for Martin's portrayal and director Atkins' work, but found the appearance by Kevin Bacon "ludicrous" and the film's tension reduced by the "virtually slapstick run from the cops".

In her review for Salon, Stephanie Zacharek found the film "so aggressively stylish that it comes off more like a stunt" with a "plodding" plot. She added though Laura Dern's performance made the film "clack along efficiently when she's onscreen," by the time of the film's "feebly shocking conclusion, we're left feeling heavily sedated, and not in the good way."

On the Rotten Tomatoes review aggregator, the film has a 38% "rotten" score, with the critical consensus being, "The quirky Novocaine flirts with both dark comedy and noir suspense, but the result is a jarring mix of tones which never quite mesh." Metacritic gave the film a 45 out of 100, indicating "mixed or average" reviews based on 27 reviews.
