= The Incident (1990 film) =

1990 American drama film

- Written by: Michael Norell; James Norell
- Directed by: Joseph Sargent
- Starring: Walter Matthau; Susan Blakely; Robert Carradine; Peter Firth; Barnard Hughes; Harry Morgan; William Schallert
- Music by: Laurence Rosenthal
- Country of origin: United States
- Original language: English

Production
- Producers: Bill Brademan; Edwin Self
- Cinematography: Kees Van Oostrum
- Editor: Debra Karen
- Running time: 100 minutes

Original release
- Network: CBS
- Release: March 4, 1990

Related
- Against Her Will: An Incident in Baltimore

The Incident is a 1990 American made-for-television drama film directed by Joseph Sargent and starring Walter Matthau, with supporting roles by Harry Morgan and Susan Blakely. It was originally broadcast on CBS on March 4, 1990. The film marked Matthau's return to television after many years.

The film was followed by two sequels: Against Her Will: An Incident in Baltimore (1992) and Incident in a Small Town (1994).

== Plot ==
In 1944, in Lincoln Bluff, a fictional, small Colorado town, the Second World War is still raging when the town's only doctor, George Hansen, is murdered at local US Army Camp Bremen, which holds German prisoners of war.

Harmon Cobb, a local lawyer, is coerced by Judge Stoddard Bell into serving as defense attorney for Sergeant Wilhelm Geiger, the German prisoner accused of killing the doctor. Cobb has no desire for Geiger to be acquitted. In addition to sharing in the wartime anti-German sentiment, Cobb has a son, Harold, who is an American soldier fighting the Germans. To preserve his self-respect as an ethical attorney, however, Cobb begins to build a nominal defense by asking several of Geiger's POW subordinates to act as character witnesses. When all refuse to testify, Cobb asks Geiger to pull rank to get them on the stand. Geiger refuses to expose the POWs to the consequences of testifying. Moreover, Geiger angrily accuses Cobb of being uninterested in the illegal activities in the camp and suggests he investigate the death of prisoner Ernst Schmidt, who supposedly died of “natural causes.”

In court, POW Sergeant Hans Riefenstahl testifies that Geiger is a member of the Nazi party sworn to "kill as many Americans for Hitler" as he can. Cobb’s sympathy toward defending Geiger is further dampened when he receives word during the trial that his son has been killed in action, resulting in a trial delay of two weeks. When Officer Joe Wallace comes to Cobb with a letter from the murdered doctor written on the day of his death, Cobb begins to suspect that not only is Geiger innocent, but Hansen's death is only the tip of the iceberg in illicit operations at Camp Bremen.

During the hiatus, Cobb digs deeper. When asked for a subpoena, Judge Bell warns Cobb against trying to build an actual case, saying that he specifically appointed Cobb as defense attorney because he expected Cobb, inexperienced in such cases, to lose the case. The judge declares that he will sentence Geiger to hang. Astounded at the judges’ unethical behavior, Cobb whines to Officer Wallace that he is being used as the court jester. Wallace advises Cobb to disrupt and dig deeper at the camp to expose the illegal beatings and deaths of POWs being countenanced by Major Lilly.

Cobb and Wallace arrive at the camp to review Hanson’s medical records of eight prisoners who died of “natural causes”. Corporal Sweazy, the MP at the gate, will not initially let them pass without consulting Major Lilly until they inform Sweazy that they have a court order to investigate Lilly. Sweazy then confides that Major Lilly allows prisoner gangs of “Lager Gestapo” to patrol the inside of the camp, terrorizing and even killing recent POWs who criticize Hitler or suggest that the war is being lost. Riefenstahl, who testified in court against Geiger, is the leader of the Lager Gestapo. Sweazy is reluctant to testify, however, since the last MP who attempted to expose the system had stolen property planted in his locker and ended up in the stockade with inmates hostile to MPs. Cobb reasons to Sweazy that if exposed, Major Lilly would be unable to retaliate.

Back in the courtroom, when Cobb attempts to introduce exculpatory evidence for Geiger, the judge orders Cobb into his chambers, but Domsczek, the prosecutor, objects to being excluded. In his chambers, the judge baldly tells them that he will sentence Geiger to hang in exchange for three American airmen who have been tried and sentenced to hang in Germany. A condemned Geiger is to be exchanged for the condemned Americans. Both Cobb and Domsczek are appalled at the disregard for Geiger's possible innocence, and prosecutor Domsczek informs the judge that if he does not permit the exculpatory evidence, he will object in court to force a mistrial. With Domsczek’s complicity, Cobb presents witnesses and evidence in court to expose the beating murder of Ernest Schmidt as well as other prisoners by the Lager Gestapo with the complicity of Dr. Hansen and Major Lilly. Riefenstahl killed Hansen, who was about to expose the illegal activities, and then framed his nemesis, Geiger, for the murder. Geiger is subsequently found innocent.

== Cast ==
- Walter Matthau as Harmon Cobb
- Susan Blakely as Billie Cobb
- Robert Carradine as Domsczek
- Peter Firth as Sergeant Wilhelm Geiger
- Barnard Hughes as Doc George Hansen
- Harry Morgan as Judge Stoddard Bell
- William Schallert as Officer Joe Wallace
- Ariana Richards as Nancy Cobb
- Norbert Weisser as Sergeant Hans Riefenstahl
- Douglas Rowe as Clarence Heathcote
- Joe Horvath as Major Lilly
- Helen Stenborg as Edna Mae Hansen
- Henry Crowell Jr. as Corporal Sweazy
- David Underwood as Lieutenant Jack Morton
- Robert Mckenzie as Sergeant Osias

== Reception ==
John J. O'Connor gave the film a positive review in The New York Times, deeming it "a first-rate production". Although he found that a number of details in the script did not make sense, he praised the historical authenticity of both the story and the production, as well as Walter Matthau's immense presence in the lead role.

=== Awards ===
| Year | Award | Result | Category |
|---|---|---|---|
| 1990 | Primetime Emmy Award | Won (tied with Caroline?) | Outstanding Made for Television Movie |
| 1990 | Primetime Emmy Award | Won | Outstanding Casting for a Miniseries or a Special |
| 1990 | Primetime Emmy Award | Nominated | Outstanding Writing in a Miniseries or a Special (Michael Norell and James Norell) |
| 1991 | Christopher Award | Won | Television and Cable |
| 1991 | Edgar Allan Poe Award | Nominated | Best Television Feature or Miniseries |
| 1991 | Writers Guild of America Award | Won | Writers Guild of America Award for Television: Long Form – Original |
