= Battledogs =

2013 film

- Screenplay by: Shane Van Dyke
- Directed by: Alexander Yellen
- Starring: Craig Sheffer; Dennis Haysbert; Ernie Hudson; Bill Duke
- Theme music composer: Christopher Cano; Chris Ridenhour
- Country of origin: United States
- Original language: English

Production
- Producer: David Michael Latt
- Cinematography: Justin Duval
- Editor: Anders Hoffmann
- Running time: 88 minutes
- Production company: Infectious Films

Original release
- Network: Syfy
- Release: April 6, 2013

Battledogs is 2013 American television film featuring Dennis Haysbert, Ernie Hudson and Bill Duke.

== Plot ==
When a strange werewolf virus threatens to decimate first New York and then the world, a rogue general uses the disease to create an army of supersoldiers.

== Cast ==
- Craig Sheffer as Major Brian Hoffman
- Dennis Haysbert as Lieutenant General Christopher Monning
- Ernie Hudson as Max Stevens
- Bill Duke as President Donald Sheridan
- Kate Vernon as Dr. Ellen Gordon
- Ariana Richards as Donna Voorhees
- Wes Studi as Captain Falcons
- Rodney Roldan as Stallion 1 Pilot
