= Incident in a Small Town =

1994 film directed by Delbert Mann

- Genre: Drama; War
- Written by: Cindy Myers
- Directed by: Delbert Mann
- Starring: Walter Matthau; Harry Morgan; Stephanie Zimbalist
- Music by: Lee Holdridge
- Country of origin: United States
- Original language: English

Production
- Executive producer: Robert Halmi Sr.
- Producer: Robert Halmi
- Cinematography: Ernest Day
- Editor: George Jay Nicholson
- Running time: 85 minutes
- Production companies: Procter & Gamble Productions; RHI Entertainment

Original release
- Network: CBS
- Release: January 23, 1994

Related
- Against Her Will: An Incident in Baltimore

Incident in a Small Town is a 1994 American made-for-television drama film directed by Delbert Mann, and starring Walter Matthau, Harry Morgan and Stephanie Zimbalist. This is the third and final film featuring the characters Harmon Cobb and Judge Stoddard Bell, following The Incident (1990) and Against Her Will: An Incident in Baltimore (1992). Cobb and Bell are played by Matthau and Morgan in all three films.

== Plot ==
In 1953 in small-town Illinois, Harmon Cobb defends his law partner, Judge Stoddard Bell, accused of killing Frank Trenton, the abusive father of his estranged daughter Lily's son John. Lily is a waitress, and 13 year old John has a newspaper route to help make ends meet. The “widowed” Lily tells John that his father was a soldier who died in France during World War II.

At his friend’s father’s bar, John meets an ex-soldier who enthralls John with tales of fighting at Normandy. The ex-soldier turns up at John’s house, having searched for Lily for months. Cold and unwelcoming, Lily tells him to go away. Arriving on scene, John learns that the man is his father, Trenton, who learns he has a son. Greeting Trenton enthusiastically, John relates that Lily had received a telegram informing that he died in France. Lily curtly orders John into the house.

Lily orders John to stay away from Trenton; resentful that his mother lied about his father, John seeks out Trenton’s company. When Trenton turns up at her work and again at her home, Lily continues to be cold. Initially apologetic for having “lost his head” years ago, Trenton then asserts she always played “hard to get”; her resistance just made it more fun. His unwanted embrace turns forceful when she again rejects him. Lily drives him off, threatening him with a garden claw. Before leaving, Trenton threatens to take John away from her.

In response to Lily’s urgent appeal, her estranged father, Bell, comes to her aid with his partner, Cobb. Bell admits to Cobb his estrangement from Lily when she became unmarried and pregnant, refusing to put the baby up for adoption. Now Lily informs Bell that she conceived John when raped by Trenton, not out of consenting passion as Bell always assumed. Lily never told Bell about the rape because he never gave her a chance, calling her a tramp. Bell instructs Cobb to get a restraining order against Trenton and file criminal charges.

Lily refuses to let Cobb use her rape as justification for a restraining order; she does not want John knowing he was conceived in rape and thinking that she resented him. In court, Trenton insists that he just kissed Lily, who overreacted by swinging at him with a gardening claw. Believing Trenton’s account, Judge Greeves denies the restraining order. Outside the courtroom, Bell threatens to wipe the smirk off Trenton’s face and feebly attacks him.

That night Lily comes to Cobb’s hotel room, with bruises on her face, saying that Bell has been arrested for Trenton’s murder. Bell tells Cobb that he woke up to Lily screaming and arrived to see her unconscious; he swung the clothesline prop at Trenton, catching him on the head. Cobb is skeptical that right-handed Bell hit Trenton on the right side. Arguing to the jury, Cobb asserts that the older and weaker Bell had to strike the aggressive Trenton in self-defense. Prosecutor Madeleine Harold describes Bell’s striking Trenton, unprovoked, after the failed injunction hearing.

Outside court, Cobb believes Bell is covering for Lily and refuses to continue his defense. In court Lily admits to killing Trenton, who attempted to sexually assault her, but she again refuses to disclose the prior rape. The prosecutor insists that Lily simply killed a man she hated. Cobb and Bell find an army witness to a past rape in France by Trenton, but the testimony is blocked because Lily would not know of that rape as justification for fear when she killed Trenton.

John expresses guilt to Cobb that his defiance of Lily’s order to stay away from Trenton led to his death. When confronted by Cobb, John admits that he killed Trenton. He saw Lily strike at Trenton with the clothesline prop, but Trenton blocked the blow and then assaulted Lily. As Trenton was lifting Lily’s skirt, John struck Trenton on the head with the clothes prop. In Judge Greeves’ chamber, John confesses to killing Trenton in Lily’s defense and to her taking the blame. Greeves dismisses the charges; the prosecutor’s office will not press charges, but Madeleine insists that John get therapy.

== Cast ==
- Walter Matthau as Harmon Cobb
- Harry Morgan as Judge Stoddard Bell
- Stephanie Zimbalist as Lily Margaret Bell
- Nick Stahl as John Bell Trenton
- Bernard Behrens as Judge Greeves
- Lori Hallier as Madeleine Harold
- David Nerman as Frank Trenton
- Dennis Strong as Joseph Baldwin
- James Blendick as Seawright
- Dee McCafferty as Police Officer
- Cara Pifko as Nancy Cobb
- Eve Crawford as Mrs. Deane
- Jim Warren as Chuck
- Jeremy Tracz as Travis
- Bruce McFee as Spencer
