= Dreamer (1979 film) =

1979 film directed by Noel Nosseck

- Theatrical release poster
- Directed by: Noel Nosseck
- Written by: James Proctor; Larry Bischof
- Produced by: Mike Lobell
- Starring: Tim Matheson; Susan Blakely; Jack Warden; Richard B. Shull; Barbara Stuart; Owen Bush; John Crawford; Marya Small; Matt Clark; Morgan Farley
- Cinematography: Bruce Surtees
- Edited by: Fred Chulack
- Music by: Bill Conti
- Distributed by: 20th Century Fox
- Release date: April 27, 1979
- Running time: 90 minutes
- Country: United States
- Language: English
- Budget: $6.44 million

Dreamer is a 1979 American sports film directed by Noel Nosseck, written by Larry Bischof and James Proctor, and starring Tim Matheson, Susan Blakely and Jack Warden. It was released theatrically on April 27, 1979, and was released by 20th Century Fox through Magnetic Video on home video.

== Story ==
A young man dreams and struggles to become a championship bowler, knowing that determination and sacrifice must come first.

Tim Matheson is the Dreamer in this story which many saw as heavily inspired by Rocky. "Dreamer" is a ten-pin whiz in his small town of Alton, Illinois, but wants to make it in the big time on the professional tour. Ultimately, he does, with the help of irascible manager Harry (Jack Warden) and faithful girlfriend Karen (Susan Blakely). As if to underline the resemblances between Dreamer and its cinematic role model, the musical score is by Rocky's Bill Conti.

Bowling legend Dick Weber appears at the movie's beginning and end as Johnny Watkin.

== Cast ==
- Tim Matheson as Harold "Dreamer" Nuttingham
- Susan Blakely as Karen Lee
- Jack Warden as Harry White
- Richard B. Shull as George Taylor
- Barbara Stuart as Angie
- Owen Bush as The Fan
- John Crawford as Riverboat Captain
- Marya Small as Elaine
- Matt Clark as Spider
- Morgan Farley as Old Timer
- Pedro Gonzalez Gonzalez as Too
- Speedy Zapata as Juan
- JoBe Cerny as Ralph Patterson
- Azizi Johari as Lady
- Dick Weber as Johnny Watkin
- Chris Schenkel as himself
- Nelson Burton Jr. as Color Man
- Julian Byrd as Red Harper
- Rita Ascot Boyd as Grandma

== Production ==
Tim Matheson had not bowled since the age of 10 when he got the starring role. To prepare for his part he spent four to six hours a day for two weeks bowling with Dick Weber's son Rich and also studied videotapes of top bowlers such as Mark Roth, Earl Anthony and Marshall Holman.

Principal photography took place in Alton, Illinois and St. Louis from July 31 to September 12, 1978. Filming was at Bowl Haven in Alton and on Sandford Ave in Alton.

The picture's production budget was reported at $2.9 million plus $3.54 million for marketing.

== Reception ==
Janet Maslin of The New York Times stated, "I'm not sure I've ever seen a movie that was supposed to tell a story and managed to be as uneventful as 'Dreamer'."

Roger Ebert gave the film 1.5 stars out of 4 and wrote, "There could no doubt be a good movie made about bowling or about the human elements in any professional sport. But 'Dreamer' doesn't even try to do that. It just takes a routine old formula, one that could apply as well (or as badly) to any sport from soccer to wrestling, and plugs in bowling as the subject matter."

Gene Siskel of the Chicago Tribune also awarded 1.5 stars out of 4 and called it "hopelessly predictable."

Variety wrote, "Shamelessly attempting to be a 'Rocky' of the bowling world, 'Dreamer' is a preposterous, colorless down-home fantasy about a youth who makes the jump from unknown bushleaguer to national champion in three easy lessons."

Kevin Thomas of the Los Angeles Times declared the film "a nice little movie" and "a pleasant piece of Midwestern Americana, refreshing in its lack of gratuitous sex and gore but also likely to be too mild for some tastes." Gary Arnold of The Washington Post called it "a pleasant, inconsequential sports melodrama."
