= Susan Blakely =

American actress

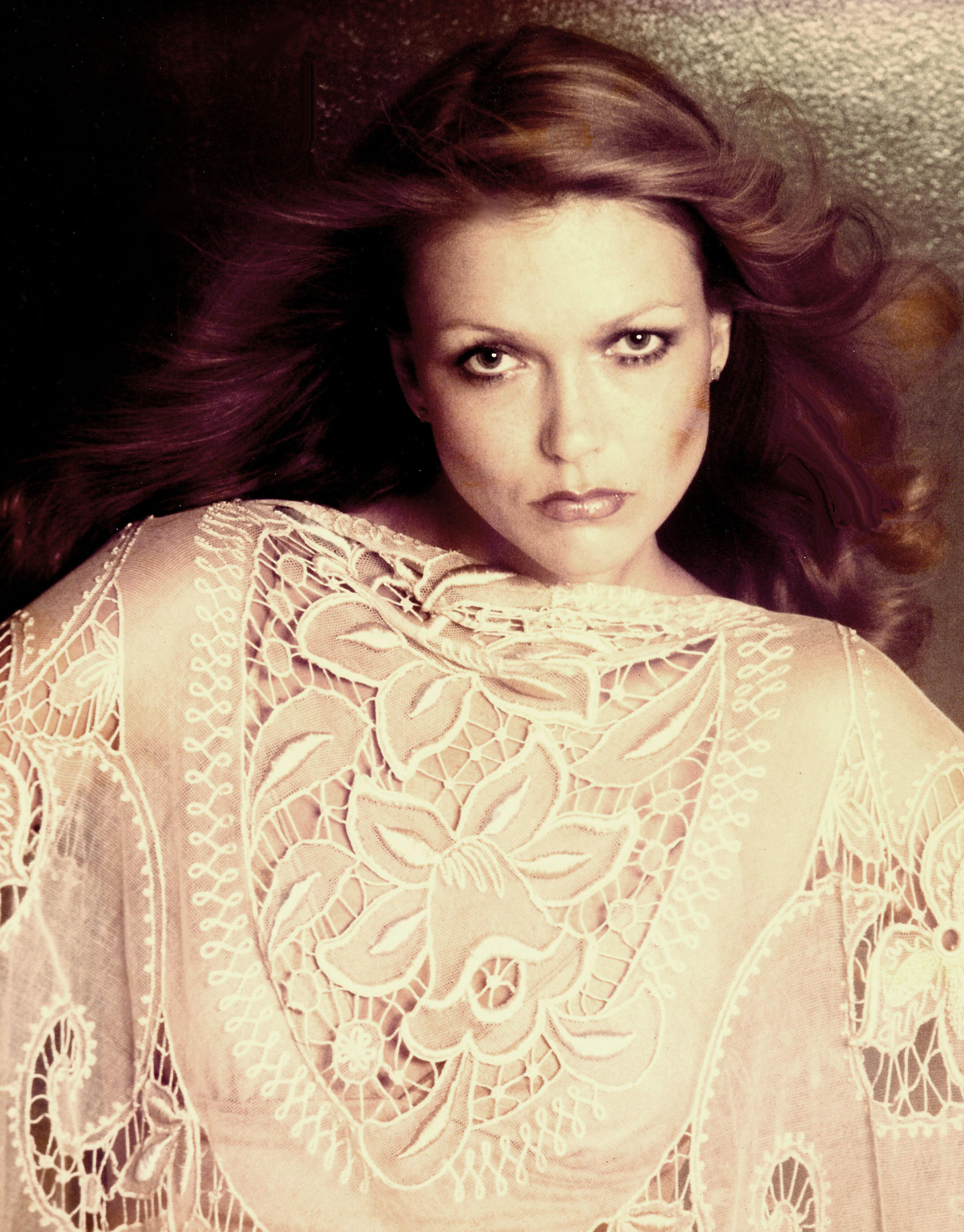
- Born: September 7, 1948 (age 77); Frankfurt, Germany
- Occupation: Actress
- Years active: 1972–present
- Spouses: Todd Merer (m. 1969; div. 1981) Steve Jaffe (m. 1982)

Susan Blakely (born September 7, 1948) is an American actress. She is best known for her leading role in the 1976 ABC miniseries Rich Man, Poor Man, for which she received a Golden Globe Award for Best Actress – Television Series Drama and an Emmy nomination for Best Actress. Blakely also has appeared in films including The Towering Inferno (1974), Report to the Commissioner (1975), Capone (1975), The Concorde... Airport '79 (1979) and Over the Top (1987).

== Early life ==
Susan Blakely was born on September 7, 1948, in Frankfurt, Germany, the daughter of an Army colonel. After she attended University of Texas at El Paso, she moved to New York and studied acting with Warren Robertson, Lee Strasberg and Sanford Meisner at the Neighborhood Playhouse and later studied with Charles Conrad and Warner Loughlin in Los Angeles. She began a professional modeling career in 1967 at the prestigious Ford Modeling Agency appearing in hundreds of commercials.

== Career ==
Blakely arrived in Hollywood in the early 1970s, and began appearing in supporting roles in films including Savages, The Way We Were, and The Lords of Flatbush. Her first major role was as Patty Simmons in the 1974 disaster film The Towering Inferno. The following year, she played the female lead roles in films Report to the Commissioner alongside Michael Moriarty, and Capone opposite Ben Gazzara.

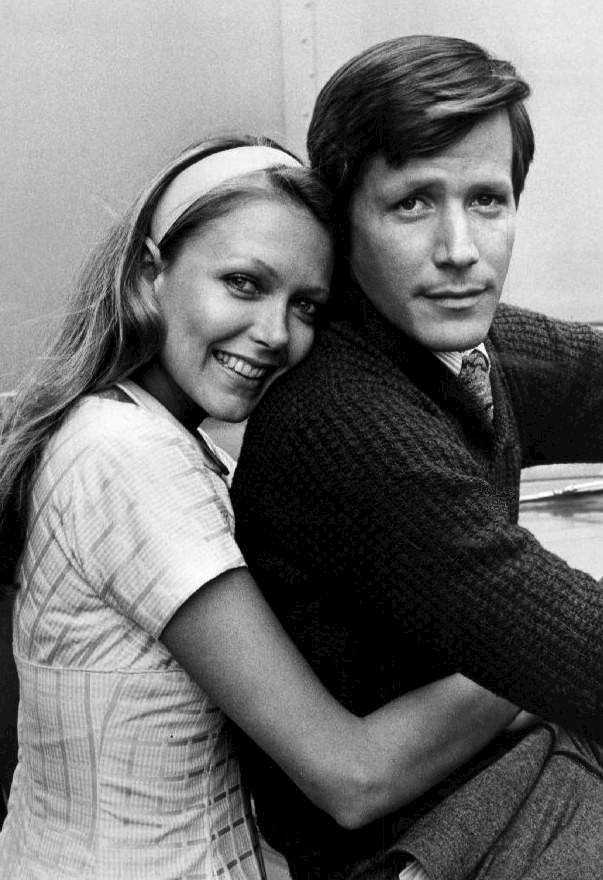
Blakely with Peter Strauss in Rich Man, Poor Man

Blakely gained wide critical acclaim with her leading role in the 1976 ABC television miniseries Rich Man, Poor Man, based on the 1969 novel of the same name by Irwin Shaw. For her performance, Blakely won that year's Golden Globe Award for Best Actress – Television Series Drama and earned a nomination for the Primetime Emmy Award for Outstanding Lead Actress in a Miniseries or a Movie. She earned a second Emmy Award nomination the following year when she reprised her role in Rich Man, Poor Man Book II. After her television success, she played leading roles in two movies in 1979: the disaster film The Concorde... Airport '79 opposite Alain Delon, and the sport drama Dreamer with Tim Matheson.

During 1980s and 1990s, Blakely played leading roles in many made-for-television movies. She portrayed Frances Farmer in the 1982 film based on Farmer's autobiography, Will There Really Be a Morning?, for which she was nominated for a Golden Globe Award for Best Actress – Miniseries or Television Film. She played Eva Braun opposite Anthony Hopkins in the Adolf Hitler biographical film The Bunker (1981), and Joan Kennedy in The Ted Kennedy Jr. Story (1986). She appeared in such feature films as Over the Top (1987), My Mom's a Werewolf (1989), and Hate Crime (2005). She recently guest-starred on This Is Us and NCIS and in past years on Hotel, The Twilight Zone, Stingray, Falcon Crest, Murder, She Wrote, Nip/Tuck, Brothers & Sisters, Southland, Two and a Half Men, In the Heat of the Night (1988 TV series), and Cougar Town.

== Personal life ==
In 1969, Blakely married a lawyer, Todd Merer. They divorced in 1981. Then in 1982, Blakely married media expert, public relations consultant and filmmaker Steve Jaffe. They reside in Beverly Hills, California.

== Filmography ==
=== Film ===
Year	Title	Role	Notes
1972	Savages	Cecily	
1973	The Way We Were	Judianne	
1974	The Lords of Flatbush	Jane Bradshaw	
1974	The Towering Inferno	Patty Duncan Simmons	
1975	Report to the Commissioner	Patty Butler	
1975	Shampoo	Girl on Street	Uncredited
1975	Capone	Iris Crawford	
1979	Dreamer	Karen	
1979	The Concorde... Airport '79	Maggie Whelan	
1987	Over the Top	Christina Hawk	
1987	The Survivalist	Linda Ryan	
1989	Dream a Little Dream	Cherry Diamond	
1989	My Mom's a Werewolf	Leslie Shaber	
1990	Out of Sight, Out of Mind	Alice Lundgren	
1992	Russian Holiday	Susan Dennison	
1994	Seven Sundays	Alice	
1999	Gut Feeling		
2001	Crash Point Zero	Barbara Esmond	
2002	Hungry Hearts	Barbi Harris	
2004	L.A. Twister	Vivian	
2005	Hate Crime	Martha Boyd	
2008	Grizzly Park	Unhappy Camper	
2008	Mating Dance	Abby's Mother	
2010	The Genesis Code	Beverly Truman	
2011	Beverly Hills Chihuahua 2	Vivian Ashe	
2013	Green Briefs	Theresa	
2017	Displacement	Carol Sinclair	

=== Television ===
Year	Title	Role	Notes
1976	Rich Man, Poor Man	Julie Prescott	Miniseries; Golden Globe Award for Best Actress – Television Series Drama; Nominated — Primetime Emmy Award for Outstanding Lead Actress in a Miniseries or a Movie
1976	Rich Man, Poor Man Book II	Julie Prescott	Miniseries; Nominated — Primetime Emmy Award for Outstanding Lead Actress in a Miniseries or a Movie
1977	Secrets	Andrea Fleming	Television film
1980	Make Me an Offer	Joyce Windsor	Television film
1980	A Cry for Love	Polly Harris	Television film
1981	The Oklahoma City Dolls	Sally Jo Purkey	Television film
1981	The Bunker	Eva Braun	Television film
1983	Will There Really Be a Morning?	Frances Farmer	Television film Nominated — Golden Globe Award for Best Actress – Miniseries or Television Film
1984	The Hitchhiker	Melody	Episode: "Remembering Melody"
1985	Stingray	Evelyn Decter	Television film
1985	The Love Boat	Nicole Phillips	2 episodes
1986	Blood & Orchids	Marie Farrell	Television film
1986	Annihilator	Layla	Television film
1986	The Ted Kennedy Jr. Story	Joan Kennedy	Television film
1987	The Twilight Zone	Linda Wolfe	Episode: "The Card/The Junction"
1985–1987	Hotel	Marion Thorne / Dr. Ann Vargo / Allison	3 episodes
1987	$25,000 Pyramid	Herself	Part of a 6 celebrity charity tournament week; aired September 21, 1987 to September 25, 1987
1987	Fatal Confession: A Father Dowling Mystery	Patricia Erdain	Television film
1988	Broken Angel	Catherine Coburn	Television film
1988	April Morning	Sarah Cooper	Television film
1988	Hiroshima Maiden	Betty Bennett	Television film
1988	Ladykillers	Lilah Corbett	Television film
1988	In the Heat of the Night	Claudia Merrill	Episode: "The Family Secret"
1990	The Incident	Billie	Television film
1990	Falcon Crest	Anne Bowen	3 episodes
1990	Dead Reckoning	Alex Barnard	Television film
1990	Murder Times Seven	Gert Kiley	Television film
1991	And the Sea Will Tell	Gail Bugliosi	Television film
1991	Blackmail	Lucinda	Television film
1991	Wildflower	Ada Guthrie	Television film
1992	Against Her Will: An Incident in Baltimore	Billie	Television film
1992	Intruders	Leigh Holland	Miniseries
1993	No Child of Mine	Peggy Young	Television film
1994	Walker, Texas Ranger	Meredith Clancy	Episode: "Deadly Vision"
1994	The True Story of the Menendez Murders	Leslie Abramson	Television film
1989–1994	Murder, She Wrote	Various	4 episodes
1995	Step by Step	Pam Marshall	Episode: "She Came in Through the Bedroom Window"
1995-2000	Diagnosis: Murder	Various	2 episodes
1996	Co-ed Call Girl	Teri Halbert	Television film
1996	Color Me Perfect	Dr. Linda Ryan	Television film
1998	Broken Silence: A Moment of Truth Movie	Margaret Carlyle	Television film
1998	7th Heaven	Elizabeth Brown	Episode: "And a Nice Chianti"
2000	Chain of Command	Meg Danforth	Television film
2000	The Perfect Nanny	Dr. Julia Bruning	Television film
2000	Her Married Lover	Laura Mannhart	Television film
2001	Baywatch Hawaii	Madam Pele/The Hitchhiker/The Tour Guide	Episode: "The Return Of Jessie"
2001	A Mother's Testimony	Donna Mulroney	Television film
2001	Strong Medicine	Camille Cantrell	Episode: "Rebirth"
2005	The Perfect Neighbor	Jeannie Costigan	Television film
2006	Cold Case	Mollie Felice	Episode: "Baby Blues"
2007	Side Order of Life	Margot McIntyre	3 episodes
2007	Nip/Tuck	Valerie Farrell	Episode: "Everett Poe"
2008	Murder 101: New Age	Camilla Meera	Television film
2008	Two and a Half Men	Angie	2 episodes
2010	Brothers & Sisters	Celia Calmartin	Episode: "Faking It"
2009, 2011	Southland	Linda Sherman	2 episodes
2012	Cougar Town	Betsy	Episode: "Ways to Be Wicked"
2013	The Perfect Boyfriend	Clara	Television film
2017	NCIS	Dr. Cadence Darwin	Episode: "Exit Strategy"
2017	Crazy Ex-Girlfriend	Gigi Plimpton	Episode: "Josh Is Irrelevant."
2017–2018	This Is Us	Anne	Recurring role
