= Playroom (film) =

- Directed by: Manny Coto
- Screenplay by: Keaton Jones
- Story by: Jackie Earle Haley
- Produced by: Luigi Cingolani
- Starring: Lisa Aliff; Aron Eisenberg; Christopher McDonald; James Purcell; Jamie Rose; Vincent Schiavelli; Kimberly Beck
- Cinematography: James L. Carter
- Edited by: Bernard Weiser
- Music by: David E. Russo
- Production company: Smart Egg Pictures
- Distributed by: Republic Pictures Home Video
- Release date: September 6, 1990 (United States)
- Running time: 90 minutes
- Country: United States
- Language: English

Playroom is a 1990 American horror film directed by Manny Coto in his directorial debut. The film stars Lisa Aliff, Aron Eisenberg, Christopher McDonald, and Vincent Schiavelli. The cinematographer was James L. Carter and the production designer was Vicky Jenson, who later went on to direct Shrek.

== Plot ==
Chris is an archaeologist who has vivid nightmares about the murder of his parents and little sister during his childhood. The family had been living in the ruins of a Yugoslavian monastery so that his father could search for the tomb of Prince Elok, a ten year old prince who was obsessed with torture and worshiped a Slavic demon. The murders were believed to have been committed by a workman named Roman Hart, who was later institutionalized at a mental hospital local to the site. Chris decides to return to the site alongside his girlfriend Jenny, who funds the expedition through her journalist job, and their friends Paul and Marcy. Soon after arriving, Chris begins to experience various delusions, including the return of his imaginary friend Daniel. His return is eventually relayed to Roman, who grows agitated and escapes the asylum so he can return to the monastery.

Chris eventually recovers his memories of the murders. As a child he had been befriended by Elok/Daniel, who had gained immortality from the demon. The drawback was that he was unable to leave the catacombs and was eventually abandoned for centuries. Elok taught him to torture small animals, which horrified Chris's sister, who revealed everything to their father. Aware that they would likely take Chris away, Elok convinced Chris to help murder the family and blame the deaths on Roman. He then invited Chris to join him in immortality, however Chris bolted at the last minute out of fear. These recovered memories drive Chris insane and he decides to rejoin Elok and accept his offer. Chris then murders Marcy and Paul. He tricks Jenny into coming to Elok's murder pit. She manages to escape to the outside, where she encounters Roman. He is mortally wounded by Chris, who then attacks Jenny. Just as he is about to kill her, Chris is shot and killed by a dying Roman, much to the sorrow of Elok as this means that he will once again be alone. The film ends with Jenny in a mental institution, where she is told that the police were unable to find all of the bodies and that there was no sign that Elok ever existed.

== Cast ==
- Lisa Aliff as Jenny
- Aron Eisenberg as Daniel
- Christopher McDonald as Chris
- James Purcell as Paul
- Jamie Rose as Marcy
- Vincent Schiavelli as Roman Hart
- Kimberly Beck as Secretary

== Production ==
The film's script was written by Jackie Earle Haley, who shopped it around to studios under the title of Schizo and according to Matty Budrewicz, had intended to serve as director. The script was picked up by Smart Egg Pictures, which approached Manny Coto to direct. Coto had then recently graduated from the American Film Institute and described the entire process as "a nightmare! It was no money, and a strange, strange deal. [Smart Egg] had this weird script and it was a ‘take it or leave it’ situation. But it was a beginning, even if it was hell to make!" Filming took place during the summer of 1989 in then-Yugoslavia. Vincent Schiavelli was brought on to portray Roman, a dig assistant framed for the murders of Daniel's parents. Coto would later work with Schiavelli on a 1991 episode of Tales from the Crypt, "Mournin' Mess", where Schiavelli also portrayed a man wrongfully accused of murder.

== Release ==
Playroom was first released to VHS in the United States through Republic Pictures Home Video on September 6, 1990. The film was released to the United Kingdom through Medusa Film during the spring of 1991 under the name Schizo.

In 2025 the film was restored by Vinegar Syndrome, which released the film onto Blu-ray.

== Reception ==
Matty Budrewicz reviewed the film for The Schlock Pit, praising the scenery while criticizing the script and narrative. Under the title Schizo, the film was also reviewed in 1991 by Fear Magazine, which gave it a score of 3 out of 5.
