= You Can't Take It with You (TV series) =

- Genre: Sitcom
- Based on: You Can't Take It with You by George Kaufman & Moss Hart
- Developed by: Hal Kanter
- Directed by: Bob LaHendro
- Starring: Harry Morgan; Lois Nettleton; Richard Sanders; Lisa Aliff; Heather Blodgett; Theodore Wilson
- Composer: Tom Bahler
- Country of origin: United States
- Original language: English
- No. of seasons: 1
- No. of episodes: 22

Production
- Executive producers: Pamela Rosser; Sid Smith; Chris Hart; Larry Patterson
- Running time: 30 minutes
- Production companies: Harps Productions; Procter & Gamble Productions; LBS Communications

Original release
- Network: Syndicated
- Release: September 16, 1987 – 1988

Related
- You Can't Take It with You (1936 play)

You Can't Take It with You is an American television sitcom produced for syndication in 1987. It was based on the 1938 film adaptation of the 1937 play.

Set in a contemporaneous home in Staten Island, the show starred Harry Morgan as the eccentric elderly family patriarch Martin Vanderhof, and Lois Nettleton as his daughter, Penny. The cast also included Richard Sanders as Penny's inventor-husband Paul, Lisa Aliff as Penny's older daughter, Alice, and Heather Blodgett (Elizabeth Townsend in the pilot) as Penny's younger daughter, Essie. Theodore Wilson appeared as neighbor Durwood Pinner.

As of 2019, some episodes are available to watch on various content streaming services. One write-up of the show noted that the play from which the material for the show was originally adapted "will be remembered long after this routine comedy is not".

== Cast ==
- Harry Morgan as Martin Vanderhof
- Lisa Aliff as Alice Sycamore
- Richard Sanders as Paul Sycamore
- Lois Nettleton as Penny Vanderhof Sycamore
- Heather Blodgett as Essie Sycamore
- Theodore Wilson as Darwood Pinner

== Episodes ==
No.	Title	Directed by	Written by	Original release date
1	TBA	Unknown	Unknown	September 16, 1987
2	TBA	Unknown	Unknown	September 23, 1987
3	TBA	Unknown	Unknown	September 30, 1987
4	TBA	Unknown	Unknown	October 7, 1987
5	TBA	Unknown	Unknown	October 14, 1987
6	TBA	Unknown	Unknown	October 21, 1987
7	TBA	Unknown	Unknown	October 28, 1987
8	TBA	Unknown	Unknown	November 4, 1987
9	"Like Mother, Like Son"	Unknown	Unknown	November 11, 1987
10	TBA	Unknown	Unknown	November 18, 1987
11	TBA	Unknown	Unknown	November 25, 1987
12	"The Trial of Martin Vanderhof"	Unknown	Unknown	December 5, 1987
13	TBA	TBD	TBD	1988
14	TBA	TBD	TBD	1988
15	TBA	TBD	TBD	1988
16	TBA	TBD	TBD	1988
17	TBA	TBD	TBD	1988
18	TBA	TBD	TBD	1988
19	TBA	TBD	TBD	1988
20	TBA	TBD	TBD	1988
3	"Grandpa's Two Suits"	Unknown	Unknown	February 26, 1988
4	"For Whom the Phone Rings"	Unknown	Unknown	April 14, 1988

== Syndication ==
You Can't Take It with You was a part of a syndication package that was conceived by NBC for its owned-and-operated stations. Five sitcoms each aired once a week under the brand "Prime Time Begins at 7:30", and were produced by various production companies contracted by NBC. Besides You Can't Take It With You, which aired on Wednesdays, the series included Marblehead Manor (from Paramount Television, airing Mondays), centering on a mansion owner and the people who live with him; She's the Sheriff (from Lorimar-Telepictures and airing Tuesdays), a comeback vehicle for Suzanne Somers which cast her as a widowed county sheriff; Out of This World (from MCA Television and airing Thursdays), which starred Maureen Flannigan as a teenager born to an alien father and human mother that develops supernatural abilities on her 13th birthday; and a revival of the short-lived 1983 NBC series We Got It Made (produced by Fred Silverman for MGM Television and closing out the week on Fridays), as part of an ongoing trend at the time in which former network series were revived in first-run syndication.

The package was aimed at attracting viewers to NBC stations in the half-hour preceding prime time (8:00 p.m. in the Eastern and Pacific Time Zones, 7:00 p.m. elsewhere), and was conceived as a result of the FCC's loosening of the Prime Time Access Rule, legislation passed in 1971 that required networks to turn over the 7:30 p.m. (Eastern) time slot to local stations to program local or syndicated content; and the relaxation of the Financial Interest and Syndication Rules, which had prevented networks from producing content from their own syndication units to fill the void. The shows that were part of the package were regularly outrated in many markets by such syndicated game shows as Wheel of Fortune, Jeopardy! and Hollywood Squares. Marblehead Manor, We Got It Made and You Can't Take It With You were cancelled at the end of the 1987–88 season, with She's the Sheriff lasting one more season in weekend syndication before its cancellation. Out of This World ran for three additional seasons, airing mainly on weekends, and was the most successful of the five series.

City	Station
Boston	WNEV-TV 7
Detroit	WXON 20
Los Angeles	KNBC-TV 4
Miami	WDZL 39
New York	WNBC-TV 4
Philadelphia	WCAU 10
Portland	KPDX 49
Seattle	KING-TV 5
Richmond	WVRN-TV 63
Waterbury	WTXX 20
York	WPMT 43
