= Ariana Richards =

American actress and painter

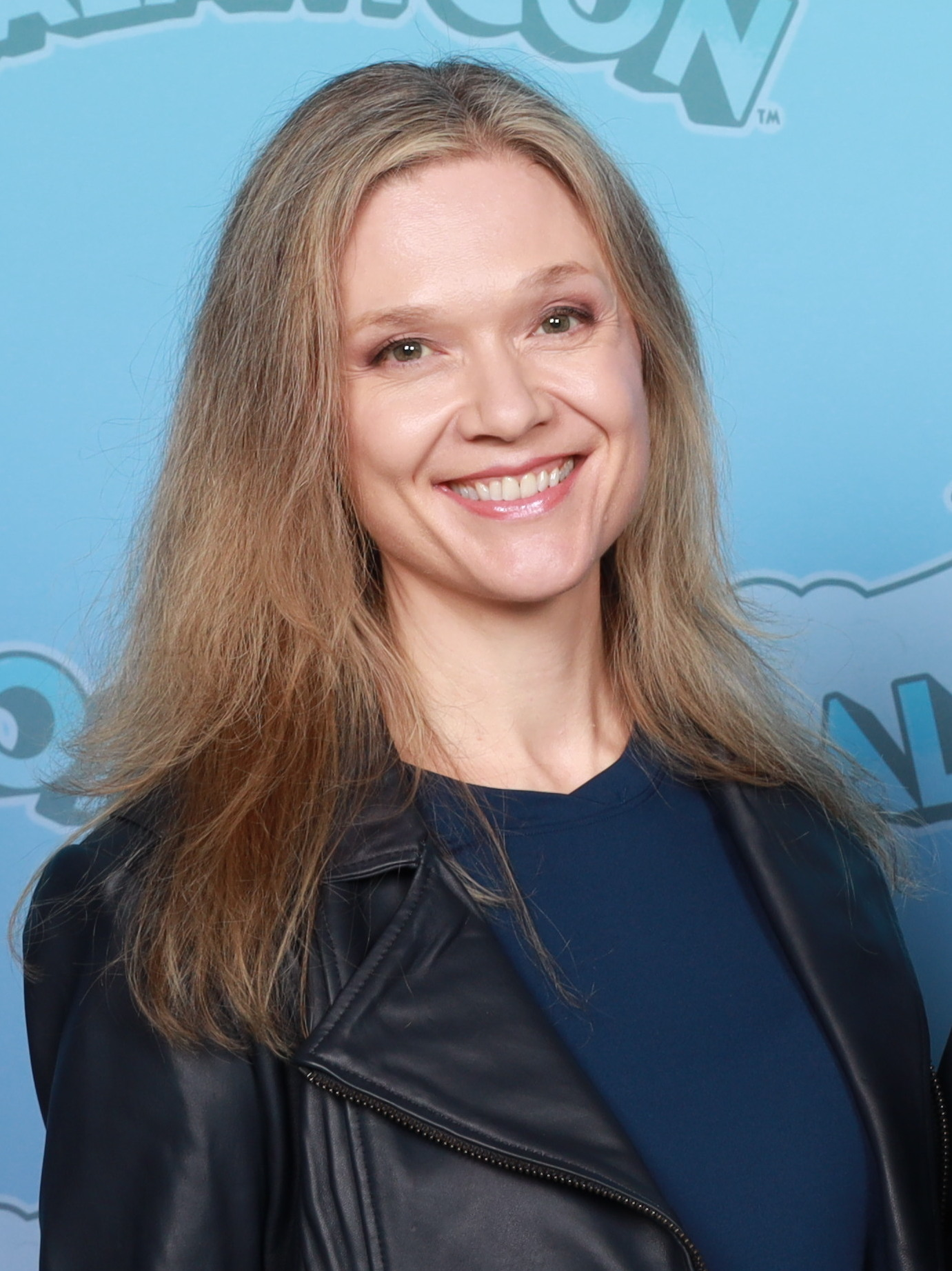
- Richards at GalaxyCon St. Louis in 2025
- Born: Ariana Clarice Richards; September 11, 1979 (age 47); Healdsburg, California, U.S.
- Occupations: Actress; painter
- Years active: 1987–2001; 2013–present
- Spouse: Mark Aaron Bolton (m. 2013)
- Children: 1
- Website: galleryariana.com

Ariana Clarice Richards (born September 11, 1979) is an American painter and actress. She is best known for her role as Lex Murphy in the 1993 film Jurassic Park. Richards won several Young Artist Awards for her acting as a child, but as an adult has focused primarily on her art career.

== Acting ==
Born September 11, 1979, a native of Healdsburg, California. Richards made her acting debut in an episode of The Golden Girls in 1987; later that year she made her big-screen bow in Into the Homeland, a made-for-cable release that starred Powers Boothe. She had a supporting role as Carol Wetherby in Prancer. She appeared as Mindy Sterngood in the first Tremors, film and reprised her role in the second sequel Tremors 3: Back to Perfection, which went straight-to-video.

She portrayed Lex Murphy in the first Jurassic Park film; she reprised the role briefly in the sequel The Lost World: Jurassic Park. She has been featured in other films such as Angus, where she played a high school cheerleader; she also appeared on television episodes of The Golden Girls, Empty Nest and Boy Meets World.

In addition to acting in movies, Richards appeared in the 1997 music video "Brick" by Ben Folds Five, portraying a high school student having an abortion. She appeared in the September 2006 issue of the British movie magazine Empire discussing a possible return to acting. Richards starred in the 2013 film Battledogs, shot in Buffalo, New York.

In February 2014, Richards was voted No. 98 on VH1's 100 Greatest Child Stars.

== Filmography ==
=== Film ===
Year	Title	Role	Notes
1988	I'm Gonna Git You Sucka	Little Girl	
1989	Face of the Enemy		Voice-over
1989	Prancer	Carol Wetherby	
1990	Tremors	Mindy Sterngood	
1990	Spaced Invaders	Kathy Hoxly	
1992	Timescape	Hillary Wilson	
1993	Jurassic Park	Lex Murphy	
1995	Angus	Melissa Lefevre	
1997	The Lost World: Jurassic Park	Lex Murphy	Cameo appearance
2001	Tremors 3: Back to Perfection	Mindy Sterngood	Direct-to-video
2013	Battledogs	Donna Voorhees	Also known as "Ward's Island"

=== Television ===
Year	Title	Role	Notes
1987	The Golden Girls	Lisa	Episode: "And Then There Was One"
1987	Into the Homeland	Ember Swallow (age 5 & 7)	Television film
1988	My Sister Sam	Morgan	Episode: "Life, Death and Admiral Andy"
1989	Empty Nest	Phoebe Swenson	Episode: "Harry Snubs Laverne"
1990	Island Son	Tess Delaney	Episode: "Viruses"
1990	The Incident	Nancy	Television film
1991	Switched at Birth	Kimberly Mays, Age 9-11	Television film
1992	Locked Up: A Mother's Rage (aka The Other Side of Love)	Kelly Gallagher	Television film
1992	Against Her Will: An Incident in Baltimore	Nancy	Television film
1994	The Kidsongs TV Show	Herself	Episode: "Dinosaur Day"
1995	Capitol Critters	President's Granddaughter	Voice only Episode: "If Lovin' You Is Wrong, I Don't Wanna Be Rat"
1996	Born Free: A New Adventure	Valerie Porter	Television film
1996	Boy Meets World	Claire Ferguson	Episode: "Dangerous Secret"
1997	Total Security	Karen Dieboldt	Episode: "Who's Poppa?"
1997	The Princess Stallion	Sarah Stewart	Television film
1998	Broken Silence: A Moment of Truth Movie (a.k.a. Race Against Fear)	Mickey Carlyle	Television film
2024	Mr Snuggles	Daisy	Web series

=== Music videos ===
Year	Title	Original artist(s)	Director(s)
1997	"Brick"	Ben Folds Five	Kevin Bray

== Music ==
On December 17, 1993, Richards released a CD album First Love on the Pony Canyon label in Japan. The album was released only in Japan and is rare and out-of-print. The tracks from the CD can be viewed on the YouTube channel of Philip Jennelle. The album was a mix between teen-pop and dance-friendly ballads of the early 1990s. There was also a single released in very small volume. Ariana and her mother wrote the words to the track "You're the Reason".

Fifteen years later, Richards returned briefly to the world of music in September 2008 and released a cover version of David Foster's "The Prayer" in a duet with Chris M. Allport, whom she has known since a young age.

== Art ==
Richards has become a successful artist. Her paintings, usually of landscapes and figures, tend to be in the style of the impressionists. In October 2005, Richards won first place in the National Professional Oil Painting Competition (sponsored by American Artist magazine) for the painting Lady of the Dahlias.

From an early age, Richards has been a keen artist, partaking in painting, sketching, and sculpting, alongside her acting career. As an adult her artwork has evolved, featuring scenes from nature like seascapes and landscapes, managing to encompass both realism and impressionism in her work.

== Personal life ==
Richards's sister, Bethany, is an actress. Her maternal grandmother, who was of Italian ancestry, was a descendant of Renaissance painter Carlo Crivelli. In addition to Italian, her maternal grandfather, William Otto Garrison's father, John, had English ancestry. Richards is a descendant of boxer John L. Sullivan, who had Irish ancestry.

Richards married Mark Bolton in Oregon in January 2013.

As of April 2013, Richards lived in Salem, Oregon.
