= City of Crime (song) =

1987 single by Tom Hanks

Single by Tom Hanks and Dan Aykroyd

from the album Music From The Motion Picture Soundtrack "Dragnet"
- Released: 1987
- Studio: MCA Records
- Genre: Pop rap
- Length: 3:34
- Label: MCA Records
- Songwriter(s): Peter Aykroyd, Dan Aykroyd, Pat Thrall

City of Crime is a single performed by actors Tom Hanks and Dan Aykroyd that was released as the soundtrack song to the 1987 film Dragnet.

== Music video ==
The dance choreography was by singer Paula Abdul.

== Reception ==
The song received mostly negative reception from critics and fans.
