= Town Theatre =

- U.S. National Register of Historic Places
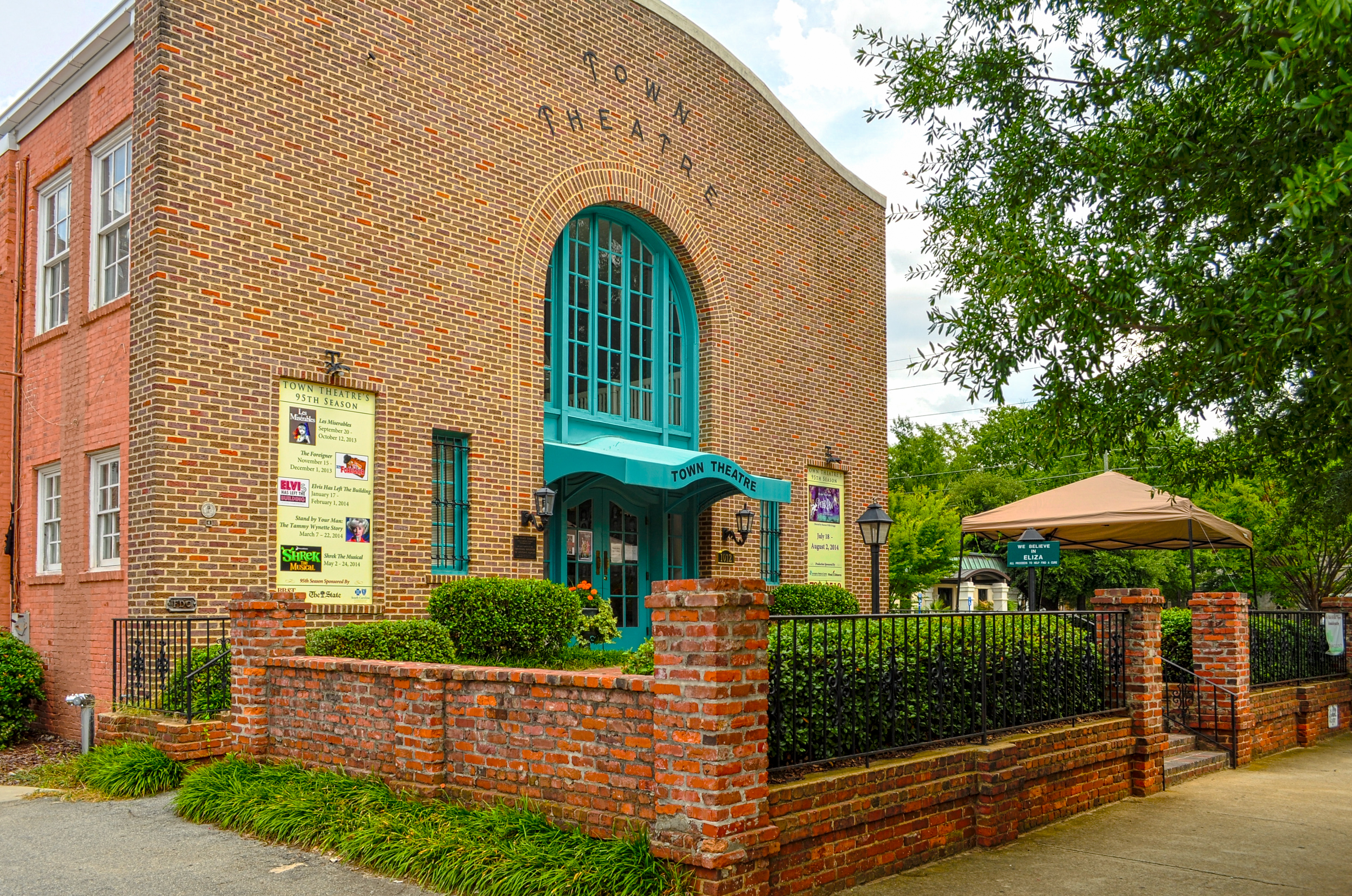

- Location within South Carolina Location within the United States
- Location: 1012 Sumter St., Columbia, South Carolina
- Coordinates: 34°0′0″N 81°1′51″W
- Area: 0.3 acres (0.12 ha)
- Built: 1924
- Architect: Jenkins, Harry; Hamby, Arthur W.
- Architectural style: Art Deco
- NRHP reference No.: 74001873
- Added to NRHP: October 9, 1974

Town Theatre is a historic community theatre located at Columbia, South Carolina. It was built in 1924, and is a rectangular brick building with a two-story glazed central arch with Art Deco influences. A brick annex was added to the rear of the building in the 1950s. It houses one of the first community theatres in the United States.

It was added to the National Register of Historic Places in 1974.
