= Harry Morgan =

American actor (1915–2011)

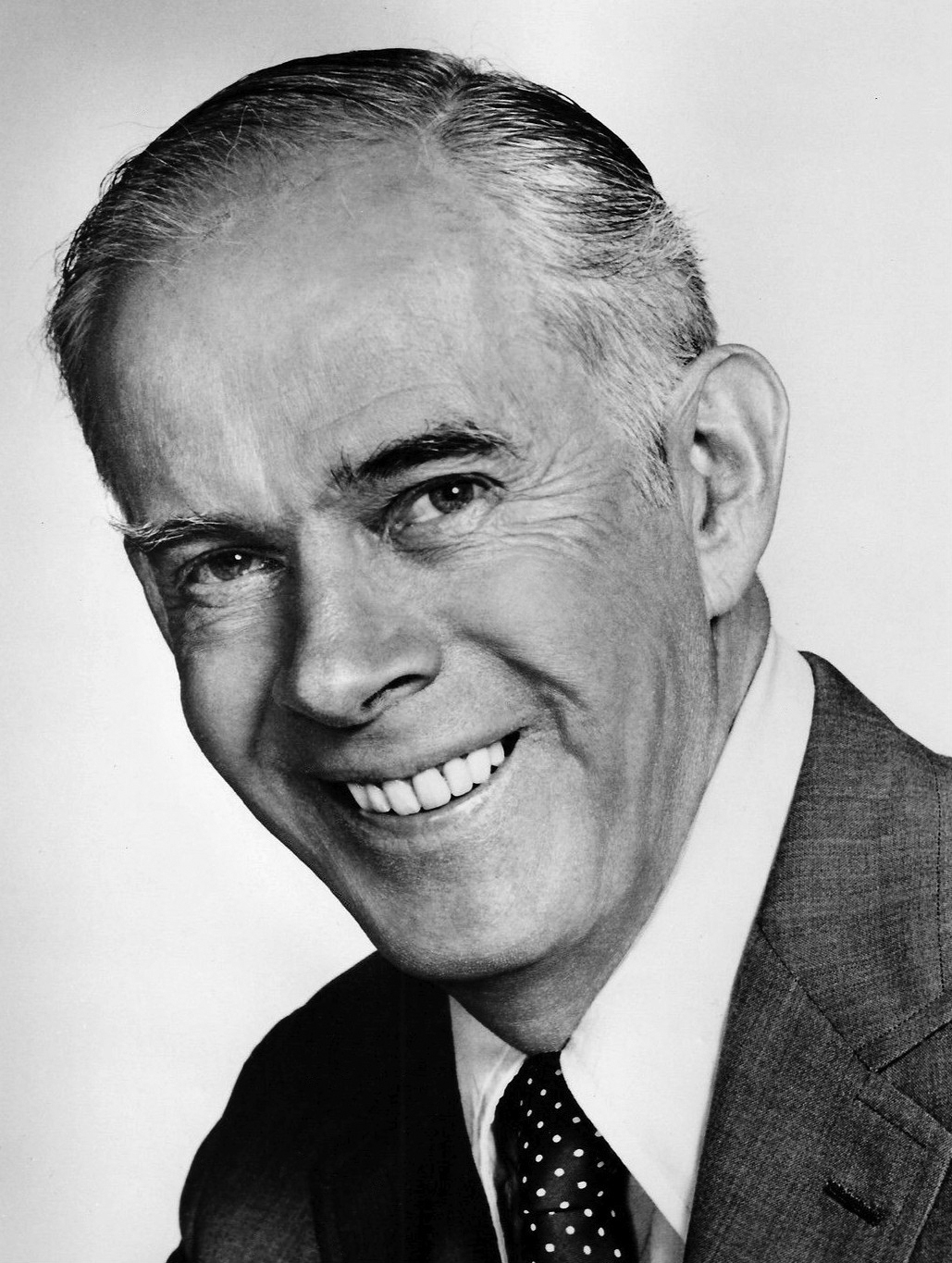
- Morgan in 1975
- Born: Harry Bratsberg; April 10, 1915; Detroit, Michigan, U.S.
- Died: December 7, 2011 (aged 96); Los Angeles, California, U.S.
- Education: University of Chicago
- Occupation: Actor
- Years active: 1935–1999
- Television: M*A*S*H; Dragnet
- Spouses: Eileen Detchon (m. 1940; died 1985) Barbara Bushman (m. 1986)
- Children: 4

Harry Morgan (né Bratsberg; April 10, 1915 – December 7, 2011) was an American actor whose television and film career spanned six decades. Morgan's major roles included Pete Porter in both December Bride (1954–1959) and Pete and Gladys (1960–1962); Officer Bill Gannon on Dragnet (1967–1970); Amos Coogan on Hec Ramsey (1972–1974); and his starring role as Colonel Sherman T. Potter in M*A*S*H (1975–1983) and AfterMASH (1983–1985). Morgan also appeared as a supporting player in more than 100 films.

== Early life ==
Morgan was born Harry Bratsberg in Detroit, the son of Hannah and Henry Bratsberg. His parents were of Swedish and Norwegian ancestry. In his interview with the Archive of American Television, Morgan spelled his Norwegian family surname as "Brasburg". Many sources, however, including some family records, list the spelling as "Bratsburg". According to one source, when Morgan's father Henry registered at junior high school, "the registrar spelled it Brasburg instead of Bratsberg. Bashful Henry did not demur."

Morgan was raised in Muskegon, Michigan, and graduated from Muskegon High School in 1933, where he achieved distinction as a statewide debating champion. He originally planned to become a lawyer, but began acting while a junior at the University of Chicago in 1935.

== Career ==
He began acting on stage under his birth name, in 1937, joining the Group Theatre in New York City formed by Harold Clurman, Cheryl Crawford, and Lee Strasberg in 1931. He appeared in the original production of the Clifford Odets play Golden Boy, followed by a host of successful Broadway roles alongside such other Group members as Lee J. Cobb, Elia Kazan, John Garfield, Sanford Meisner, and Karl Malden. Morgan also did summer stock at the Pine Brook Country Club located in the countryside of Nichols, Connecticut.

=== Film work ===
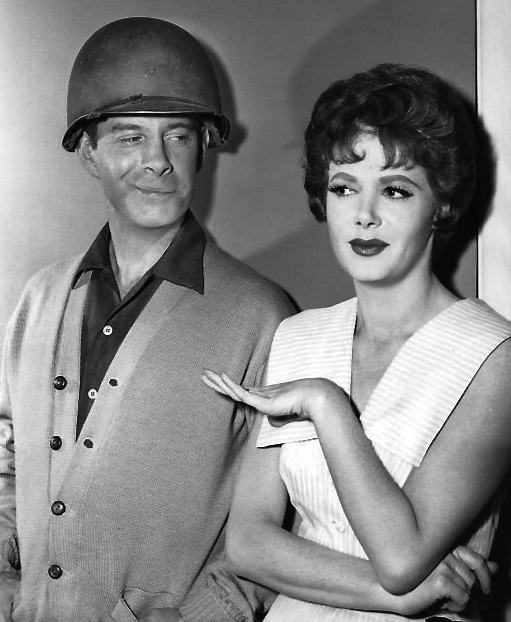
With Cara Williams in Pete and Gladys

Morgan made his screen debut (originally using the name "Henry Morgan") in the 1942 movie To the Shores of Tripoli. His screen name later became "Henry 'Harry' Morgan" and eventually Harry Morgan, to deter confusion with the popular humorist of the same name.

In the same year, Morgan appeared in the movie Orchestra Wives as a young man pushing his way to the front of a ballroom crowd with his date to hear Glenn Miller's band play. A few years later, still credited as Henry Morgan, he was cast in the role of pianist Chummy MacGregor in the 1954 biopic The Glenn Miller Story.

Morgan continued to play a number of significant roles on the big screen in such films as The Ox-Bow Incident (1943) with Henry Fonda, Wing and a Prayer (1944), A Bell for Adano (1945), State Fair (1945), Dragonwyck (1946) with Walter Huston, The Gangster (1947), The Big Clock (1948) with Charles Laughton, The Well (1951), High Noon (1952) with Gary Cooper and Grace Kelly, Torch Song (1953) with Joan Crawford, and several films in the 1950s for director Anthony Mann starring James Stewart, including Bend of the River (1952), Thunder Bay (1953), The Glenn Miller Story (1954), The Far Country (1955), and Strategic Air Command (1955). In his later film career, he appeared in Inherit the Wind (1960) with Spencer Tracy and Fredric March, How the West Was Won (1962) (as Ulysses S. Grant) with John Wayne, John Goldfarb, Please Come Home! (1965) with Peter Ustinov, Frankie and Johnny (1966) with Elvis Presley and Donna Douglas, The Flim-Flam Man (1967) with George C. Scott, Support Your Local Sheriff! (1969) with James Garner, Support Your Local Gunfighter (1971) also with James Garner, Snowball Express (1972) with Keenan Wynn, The Shootist (1976) with John Wayne and Lauren Bacall, The Wild Wild West Revisited (1979) with Robert Conrad, and as Captain Gannon in the theatrical film version of Dragnet (1987) with Dan Aykroyd and Tom Hanks.

=== Radio and television ===
Morgan hosted the NBC radio series Mystery in the Air starring Peter Lorre in 1947. On CBS, he played Pete Porter in Pete and Gladys (1960–1962), with Cara Williams as wife Gladys. Pete and Gladys was a spin-off of December Bride (1954–1959), starring Spring Byington, a show in which Morgan had a popular recurring role. In 1950, Morgan appeared as an obtrusive, alcohol-addled hotel clerk in the Dragnet radio episode "The Big Boys". Morgan also starred in the popular western "Gunsmoke" in 1970 season 16 episode 11 "The Witness" as Osgood Picket, the father of a killer that eliminates one witness and takes the family of another hostage to prevent testimony against his son. Morgan playing the role of a "Bad Guy" in the role is different from the well known roles he is known for.

=== Dragnet ===
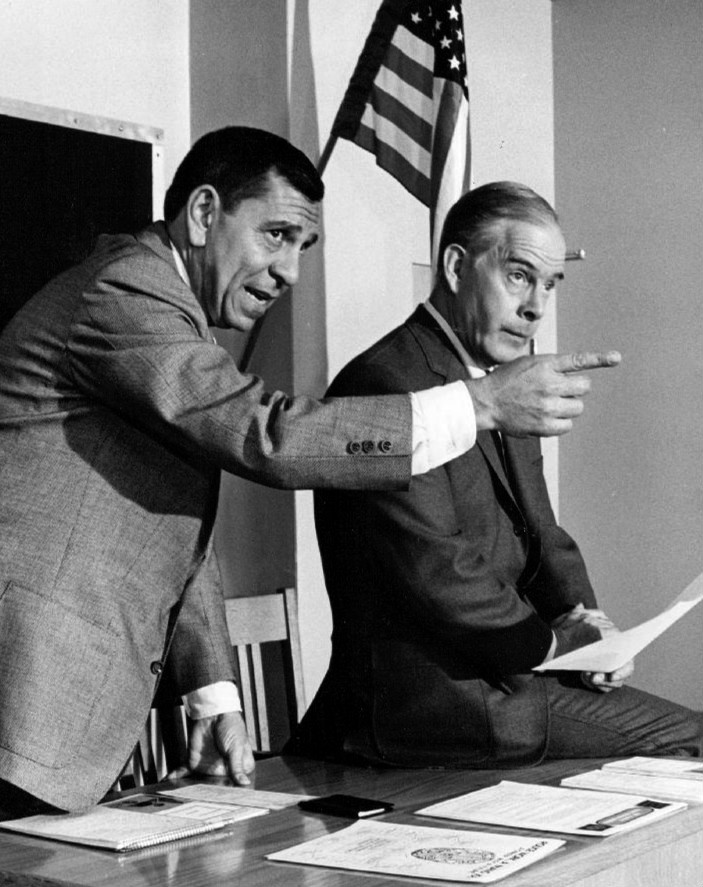
Morgan with Jack Webb in Dragnet

After Pete and Gladys ended production, Morgan guest-starred in the role of Al Everett in the 1962 episode "Like My Own Brother" on Gene Kelly's ABC drama series, Going My Way, loosely based on the 1944 Bing Crosby film of the same name. That same year, he played the mobster Bugs Moran in an episode of ABC's The Untouchables, with Robert Stack. In 1963, he was cast as Sheriff Ernie Backwater on Richard Boone's Have Gun – Will Travel Western series on CBS, then worked as a regular cast member on the 1963–64 anthology series The Richard Boone Show.

In the 1964–1965 season, Morgan co-starred as Seldom Jackson in the 26-week NBC comedy/drama Kentucky Jones, starring Dennis Weaver, formerly of Gunsmoke.

Morgan is even more widely recognized as Officer Bill Gannon, Joe Friday's partner in the revived version of Dragnet (1967–1970).

Morgan had also appeared with Dragnet star Jack Webb in three film noir movies, Dark City (1950), Appointment with Danger (1951) and Pete Kelly's Blues (1955), and was an early regular member of Jack Webb's stock company of actors on the original Dragnet radio show. Morgan later worked on two other shows for Webb: 1971's The D.A. and the 1972–1974 Western series, Hec Ramsey. Morgan also appeared in four episodes of Gunsmoke ("The Witness" – aired 11/23/1970, "Milligan" - aired 11/6/72, "The Wiving" - aired 10/14/1974 and "Brides and Grooms", sequel to The Wiving - aired 2/10/1975).

Morgan appeared in the role of Inspector Richard Queen, uncle of Ellery Queen in the 1971 television film Ellery Queen: Don't Look Behind You.

=== M*A*S*H ===
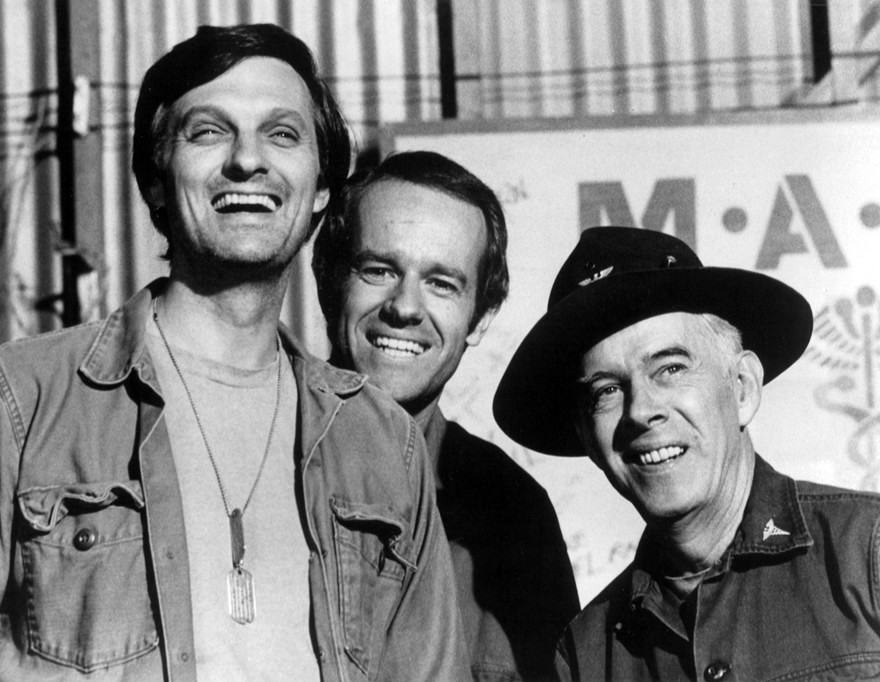
As Colonel Potter in M*A*S*H with Alan Alda and Mike Farrell

Morgan's first appearance on M*A*S*H was in the show's third season (1974–1975), when he played the mentally unbalanced Major General Bartford Hamilton Steele in "The General Flipped at Dawn", which first aired on September 10, 1974.

The following season, Morgan joined the cast of M*A*S*H as Colonel Sherman T. Potter. A fan of the sitcom, Morgan replaced McLean Stevenson, who left the show at the end of the previous season. Unlike Stevenson's character, Henry Blake, Potter was a career Army officer who was a firm yet good-humored, caring father figure to those under his command.

In 1980, Morgan won an Emmy Award for his performance on M*A*S*H. When asked if he was a better actor after working with the show's talented cast, Morgan responded, "I don't know about that, but it's made me a better human being." After the end of the series, Morgan reprised the Potter role in a short-lived spinoff series, AfterMASH.

Morgan also appeared in several Disney movies throughout the decade, including The Barefoot Executive, Snowball Express, Charley and the Angel, The Apple Dumpling Gang, The Cat from Outer Space (opposite McLean Stevenson) and The Apple Dumpling Gang Rides Again.

=== Later years ===
In 1986, he co-starred with Hal Linden in Blacke's Magic, a show about a magician who doubled as a detective solving unusual crimes. One season was made. Morgan's character, Leonard Blacke, was a semiretired con artist.

In 1987, Morgan reprised his Bill Gannon character, now a captain, for a supporting role in another film version of Dragnet, a parody and homage to the original series written by and starring Dan Aykroyd and costarring Tom Hanks and Christopher Plummer.

In 1987–1988, Morgan starred in the one-season situation comedy series You Can't Take It with You as family patriarch Martin Vanderhof.

In the 1990s, Morgan starred alongside Walter Matthau in a series of television movies for CBS as Stoddard Bell, a judge who is an acquaintance/nemesis/partner of Matthau's Harmon Cobb, an attorney (The Incident; An Incident in Baltimore, and Incident in a Small Town). He also lent his voice to an episode of The Simpsons from season seven, where he once again played Bill Gannon; in the episode "Mother Simpson", Gannon and Joe Friday (voiced by Harry Shearer) are FBI agents trying to track down Homer's mother, who is a fugitive from justice.

Morgan also had a recurring role on 3rd Rock from the Sun as Professor Suter, a colleague of Dick Solomon's. Morgan directed episodes for several TV series, including two episodes of The Alfred Hitchcock Hour, two episodes of Hec Ramsey, and one episode of Adam-12. Morgan had a guest role on The Jeff Foxworthy Show as Raymond and a guest role on Grace Under Fire as Jean's pot-smoking boyfriend.

In 2006, Morgan was inducted into the Hall of Great Western Performers at the National Cowboy & Western Heritage Museum in Oklahoma City, Oklahoma.

== Personal life ==
Morgan's first marriage was to Eileen Detchon from 1940 until her death in 1985. During Morgan's time on M*A*S*H, a photograph of Detchon regularly appeared on the desk of his character. A drawing of a horse, seen on the wall behind Potter's desk, was drawn by Morgan's grandson, Jeremy Morgan. In addition, Eileen was the name of the wife of Officer Bill Gannon on Dragnet. Morgan had four sons with his first wife: Christopher, Charles, Paul, and Daniel (who died in 1989).

On December 17, 1986 Morgan married Barbara Bushman Quine, a granddaughter of silent film star Francis X. Bushman. The marriage lasted until his death. In July 1996, Morgan was arrested on domestic battery charges for striking his wife Barbara which caused her to be admitted to the hospital. Though she was left "bruised and bloodied," the case was later dismissed after Morgan attended court-ordered anger management and domestic violence counseling program.

Morgan had two siblings, Marguerite and Arnold.

Morgan was friends with bandleader Glenn Miller. They met while filming Orchestra Wives in 1942, and remained close until Miller's disappearance and presumed death two years later. Morgan was later cast in the 1954 movie biography, The Glenn Miller Story, portraying musician Chummy MacGregor.

== Death ==
Morgan died in his sleep on December 7, 2011, at the age of 96. His son, Charles, said he recently had been treated for pneumonia. His body was cremated and his remains were given to his family.

Following Morgan's death, Mike Farrell, who played B. J. Hunnicutt opposite Morgan in M*A*S*H, released a statement:

He was a wonderful man, a fabulous actor and a dear and close friend since the first day we worked together. As Alan [Alda] said, he did not have an unadorable bone in his body. He was a treasure as a person, an imp at times, and always a true professional. He had worked with the greats and never saw himself as one of them. But he was. He was the rock everyone depended on and yet he could cut up like a kid when the situation warranted it. He was the apotheosis, the finest example of what people call a 'character actor.' What he brought to the work made everyone better. He made those who are thought of as 'stars' shine even more brightly. The love and admiration we all felt for him were returned tenfold in many, many ways. And the greatest and most selfless tribute to the experience we enjoyed was paid by Harry at the press conference when our show ended. He remarked that someone had asked him if working on M*A*S*H had made him a better actor. He responded by saying, 'I don't know about that, but it made me a better human being.' It's hard to imagine a better one.

== Filmography ==
=== Films ===
- To the Shores of Tripoli (1942) as Mouthy
- The Loves of Edgar Allan Poe (1942) as Ebenezer Burling
- The Omaha Trail (1942) as Henchman Nat
- Orchestra Wives (1942) as Cully Anderson
- Crash Dive (1943) as Brownie
- The Ox-Bow Incident (1943) as Art Croft
- Happy Land (1943) as Anton 'Tony' Cavrek
- The Eve of St. Mark (1944) as Private Shevlin
- Roger Touhy, Gangster (1944) as Thomas J. 'Smoke' Reardon
- Wing and a Prayer (1944) as Ensign Malcolm Brainard
- Gentle Annie (1944) as Cottonwood Goss
- A Bell for Adano (1945) as Captain N. Purvis
- State Fair (1945) as Barker
- From This Day Forward (1946) as Hank Beesley
- Johnny Comes Flying Home (1946) as Joe Patillo
- Dragonwyck (1946) as Klaas Bleecker
- Somewhere in the Night (1946) as Bath Attendant (uncredited)
- It Shouldn't Happen to a Dog (1946) as Gus Rivers
- Crime Doctor's Man Hunt (1946) as Jervis (uncredited)
- The Gangster (1947) as Shorty
- The Big Clock (1948) as Bill Womack
- All My Sons (1948) as Frank Lubey
- Race Street (1948) as Hal Towers
- The Saxon Charm (1948) as Hermy
- Moonrise (1948) as Billy Scripture
- Yellow Sky (1948) as Half Pint
- Down to the Sea in Ships (1949) as Britton
- The Beautiful Blonde from Bashful Bend (1949) as Hoodlum (uncredited)
- Madame Bovary (1949) as Hyppolite
- Strange Bargain (1949) as Lieutenant Richard Webb
- Red Light (1949) as Rocky
- Holiday Affair (1949) as Police Lieutenant
- Hello Out There (1949) as The Young Gambler
- Outside the Wall (1950) as Garth
- The Showdown (1950) as Rod Main
- Dark City (1950) as Soldier
- Belle Le Grand (1951) as Abel Stone
- When I Grow Up (1951) as Father Reed (modern)
- Appointment with Danger (1951) as George Soderquist
- The Highwayman (1951) as Tim
- The Well (1951) as Claude Packard
- The Blue Veil (1951) as Charles Hall
- Boots Malone (1952) as Quarter Horse Henry
- Scandal Sheet (1952) as Biddle
- Bend of the River (1952) as Shorty
- My Six Convicts (1952) as Dawson
- High Noon (1952) as Sam Fuller
- What Price Glory? (1952) as Sergeant Moran (uncredited)
- Big Jim McLain (1952) as Narrator (voice, uncredited)
- Apache War Smoke (1952) as Ed Cotten
- Toughest Man in Arizona (1952) as Verne Kimber
- Stop, You're Killing Me (1952) as Innocence
- Thunder Bay (1953) as Rawlings
- Arena (1953) as Lew Hutchins
- Champ for a Day (1953) as Al Muntz
- Torch Song (1953) as Joe Denner
- The Glenn Miller Story (1954) as Chummy
- Prisoner of War (1954) as Major O.D. Halle
- The Forty-Niners (1954) as Alf Billings
- About Mrs. Leslie (1954) as Fred Blue
- The Far Country (1954) as Ketchum
- Strategic Air Command (1955) as Master Sergeant Bible (flight engineer)
- Not as a Stranger (1955) as Oley
- Pete Kelly's Blues (1955) (uncredited)
- The Bottom of the Bottle (1956) as Felix, Barkeep
- Backlash (1956) as Tony Welker
- Operation Teahouse (1956) as Himself
- UFO (1956) as "Red Dog 1" (voice)
- Star in the Dust (1956) as Lew Hogan
- The Teahouse of the August Moon (1956) as Sergeant Gregovich
- Under Fire (1957) as Sergeant Joseph C. Dusak
- It Started with a Kiss (1959) as Charles Meriden
- The Mountain Road (1960) as Sergeant 'Mike' Michaelson
- Inherit the Wind (1960) as Judge Mel Coffey
- Cimarron (1960) as Jesse Rickey
- How the West Was Won (1962) as General Ulysses S. Grant
- John Goldfarb, Please Come Home! (1965) as Secretary of State Deems Sarajevo
- Frankie and Johnny (1966) as Cully
- What Did You Do in the War, Daddy? (1966) as Major Pott
- The Flim-Flam Man (1967) as Sheriff Slade
- Star Spangled Salesman (1968) as TV Cop
- Support Your Local Sheriff! (1969) as Olly Perkins
- Viva Max! (1969) as Chief of Police Sylvester
- The Barefoot Executive (1971) as E.J. Crampton
- Support Your Local Gunfighter! (1971) as Taylor
- Scandalous John (1971) as Sheriff Pippin
- Snowball Express (1972) as Jesse McCord
- Charley and the Angel (1973) as The Angel formerly Roy Zerney
- The Apple Dumpling Gang (1975) as Homer McCoy
- The Shootist (1976) as Marshall Thibido
- Maneaters Are Loose! (1978) as Toby Waites
- The Cat from Outer Space (1978) as General Stilton
- The Apple Dumpling Gang Rides Again (1979) as Major T.P. Gaskill
- The Wild Wild West Revisited (TV, 1979) as Robert T. Malone
- More Wild Wild West (TV, 1980) as Robert T. Malone
- Scout's Honor (TV, 1980) as Mr. Briggs
- The Flight of Dragons (1982) as Carolinus (voice)
- Sparkling Cyanide (TV, 1983) as Captain Kemp
- Dragnet (1987) as Captain Gannon
- 14 Going on 30 (TV, 1988) as Uncle Herb
- The Incident (TV, 1990) as Judge Bell
- Against Her Will: An Incident in Baltimore (TV, 1992) as Judge Bell
- Incident in a Small Town (TV, 1994) as Judge Bell
- Wild Bill: Hollywood Maverick (1996)
- Family Plan (1997) as Sol Rubins
- Crosswalk (1999) as Dr. Chandler

=== TV ===
- Have Gun – Will Travel (1958) A Snare for Murder as Fred Braus; American Primitive (1963) as Sheriff Ernie Backwater
- Alfred Hitchcock Presents (1959) (Season 5 Episode 6 (159): "Anniversary Gift") as Hermie Jenkins
- The Untouchables (1962) Episode 100 "Double Cross" as George Bugs Moran
- Pete and Gladys (1960–1962, 72 episodes) as Pete Porter
- Dragnet (1967–1970, 98 episodes) as Officer Bill Gannon
- The Partridge Family (1970, Season 1, Episode 2, "The Sound of Money") as Willie Larkin
- Hec Ramsey (1972–1974, 8 episodes) as Doc Amos Coogan
- M*A*S*H (1975–1983, 180 episodes) as Colonel Sherman T. Potter - Major General Bartford Hamilton Steele
- The Bastard (TV miniseries, 1978) as Captain Caleb
- The Love Boat (1978)
- Backstairs at the White House (TV miniseries, 1979) as President Harry S. Truman
- AfterMASH (1983–1985, 31 episodes) as Dr. Sherman T. Potter
- Blacke's Magic (1986, 13 episodes) as Leonard Blacke
- Murder, She Wrote (1987) Season 3, Episode 21 "The Days Dwindle Down" as Retired Lieutenant Richard Webb
- You Can't Take It with You (1987–1988, 22 episodes) as Martin Vanderhof
- The Twilight Zone (1988) Season 3, Episode 1 "The Curious Case of Edgar Witherspoon" as Edgar Witherspoon.
- The Simpsons (1995) Episode 136 "Mother Simpson" as Bill Gannon
- 3rd Rock from the Sun (1996) as Professor Suter
