= Dragnet (1987 film) =

1987 comedy film directed by Tom Mankiewicz

- Theatrical release poster by Mick McGinty
- Directed by: Tom Mankiewicz
- Screenplay by: Dan Aykroyd; Alan Zweibel; Tom Mankiewicz
- Based on: Dragnet by Jack Webb
- Produced by: Bernie Brillstein; David Permut; Robert K. Weiss
- Starring: Dan Aykroyd; Tom Hanks; Christopher Plummer; Harry Morgan; Alexandra Paul; Dabney Coleman
- Cinematography: Matthew F. Leonetti
- Edited by: William D. Gordean; Richard Halsey
- Music by: Ira Newborn
- Production companies: Universal Pictures; Applied Action
- Distributed by: Universal Pictures
- Release date: June 26, 1987
- Running time: 106 minutes
- Country: United States
- Language: English
- Budget: $20 million
- Box office: $66.7 million

Dragnet is a 1987 American buddy cop parody-slapstick comedy film directed and co-written by Tom Mankiewicz in his directorial debut. Starring Dan Aykroyd and Tom Hanks, the film is based on the radio and television crime drama of the same name. The screenplay, both a parody of and homage to the long-running television series, was written by Aykroyd, Mankiewicz and Alan Zweibel. The original music score is by Ira Newborn.

Aykroyd plays Joe Friday, nephew of the original series protagonist played by Jack Webb, while Hanks plays Pep Streebek, his new partner. Harry Morgan reprises his role from the 1967–70 television revival and 1966 television film as Bill Gannon, the original Friday's partner, now a captain and Friday and Streebek's boss.

== Plot ==
LAPD Sergeant Joe Friday's nephew and namesake, whose anachronistic views reflect those of his deceased uncle, is involuntarily assigned a cocky, streetwise new partner, Pep Streebek, as Friday's previous longtime partner in the Robbery-Homicide Division, Frank Smith, recently quit the department without notice after their 12 years together to buy a goat farm in Ukiah. Their contrasting styles clash at first, with Friday criticizing Streebek's attitude, hairstyle and wardrobe. However, they start to bond while investigating a series of bizarre thefts. Among the stolen items is the entire print run of the 25th anniversary edition of Bait, a pornographic magazine published by Jerry Caesar that the Reverend Jonathan Whirley, the founder of MAMA (Moral Advance Movement of America), has been leading a moral crusade against.

Friday and Streebek follow the trail to a cult calling itself P.A.G.A.N., an acronym for "People Against Goodness and Normalcy." They interrogate member Emil Muzz, working as Caesar's limousine driver, who reveals the time and place of a secret ceremony. The duo infiltrates the ceremony, disguised as members, and witness a masked leader using several stolen items in a ritual leading up to a virgin sacrifice. The leader throws the victim, Connie Swail (referred to as "the virgin Connie Swail"), into a pit of water with an anaconda. Friday and Streebek disrupt the ritual, saving Connie and subduing the snake, and report the incident to their boss Captain Bill Gannon. However, when Gannon and potential mayoral candidate Police Commissioner Jane Kirkpatrick visit the site with them the next day, no evidence of the ritual can be found. Kirkpatrick removes Friday and Streebek from the case.

Streebek receives information from the undercover narcotics unit where he formerly worked about the location of a load of trichlornitromethane and the pseudo-halogenic compound cyanogen, previously stolen by the cult, that can mass-produce a highly poisonous gas when mixed properly in the exact ratio. He and Friday commandeer a tank with a battering ram to raid the location, which proves to be an ordinary milk pasteurizing plant. The chemicals and gas-making equipment are actually hidden next door. With no further leads to pursue, the duo attend a birthday dinner for Friday's maternal grandmother Grace Mundy at her favorite restaurant the Brown Derby. Connie soon joins them at Friday's invitation.

During dinner, Connie notices Whirley, Gannon and Kirkpatrick at another table. She identifies Whirley as the cult leader, having encountered and unmasked him while fleeing the ritual. Friday attempts to arrest Whirley, but the corrupt Kirkpatrick, whose mayoral campaign is being secretly bankrolled by Whirley and Caesar, overrules him and relieves him of duty (all of the cult's crimes had been part of Kirkpatrick's campaign, as an elevated crime rate would discredit the current mayor Peter Parvin). Gannon reluctantly suspends Friday from duty and orders Streebek to stay away from Whirley.

While Friday is taking Connie home, Muzz captures them and takes them to the Griffith Observatory, where Whirley reveals to them his plan to kill Caesar at a reunion party for the models of Bait. He orders his men to take Connie to his private jet and prepares to kill Friday but Streebek serendipitously arrives, having forced Muzz to reveal Friday's whereabouts at gunpoint. Streebek infiltrates Caesar's mansion and disrupts the cult's plans to release the gas made from the stolen chemicals, just before Whirley sets the stolen magazines ablaze to cover his escape. Gannon arrives with SWAT teams and Friday crashes the estate gates with an armored vehicle. Streebek personally arrests Muzz while Caesar gratefully thanks Friday for defusing the gas attack. Gannon reinstates Friday and returns his badge so he can pursue Whirley.

At the airport, Whirley meets Kirkpatrick and then abandons her before absconding with Connie as his hostage. The following morning, he is cornered by Friday via a police jet and forced to land; soon afterwards, he is convicted on multiple charges and receives "43 consecutive 99-year sentences" (despite being eligible for parole in seven years) in the Men's Correctional Institute in Chino. Kirkpatrick's fate is never revealed, though the exposure of her criminal activity ends her career. Friday continues his partnership with Streebek and begins dating Connie, whom he no longer refers to as "the virgin".

== Cast ==
- Dan Aykroyd as Detective Sergeant Joe Friday
- Tom Hanks as Detective Pep Streebek
- Christopher Plummer as the Reverend Jonathan Whirley
- Harry Morgan as Captain Bill Gannon, one of the original Friday's old partners
- Alexandra Paul as "the Virgin" Connie Swail
- Jack O'Halloran as Emil Muzz
- Elizabeth Ashley as Commissioner Jane Kirkpatrick
- Lenka Peterson as Granny Grace Mundy
- Dabney Coleman as Jerry Caesar

Jack Webb, who played Joe Friday in the original TV series, appears in a photo on the younger Friday's LAPD work desk. Aykroyd's Friday refers to him as his uncle and namesake.

== Production ==
The script for Dragnet was written by Dan Aykroyd and Alan Zweibel, who had worked together during Aykroyd's tenure on Saturday Night Live. Aykroyd had in fact starred as Joe Friday in a Saturday Night Live parody of Dragnet in 1976. Tom Mankiewicz, best known for his work on Superman and the James Bond series, had a deal at Universal and was brought in to work on the film script with them. Ted Kotcheff was originally attached to direct but did not like the draft the three writers had come up with, so Frank Price at Universal suggested Mankiewicz himself direct. Albert Brooks was offered the role of Pep Streebek, but he turned it down. Aykroyd originally wanted Jim Belushi to play Streebek but Belushi was unavailable and Tom Hanks was cast instead.

British electronic group Art of Noise produced an update of the series' original theme music for the title credits. They set the Dragnet theme against an electronic breakbeat and added soundbites from the film, such as Friday's trademark lines "This is the city", "Just the facts, ma'am" and "I carry a badge.", timed to the music.

The soundtrack includes an original song called "City of Crime", a rock/hip-hop hybrid collaboration performed by Aykroyd and Hanks with bassist/vocalist Glenn Hughes and guitarist Pat Thrall. The track is played over the film's closing credits and had a promotional music video that featured Aykroyd and Hanks and was choreographed by Paula Abdul. The high-energy theme song, "Just the Facts", was performed by Patti LaBelle and produced by Jimmy Jam and Terry Lewis.

== Reception ==
The film received favorable reviews from Gene Siskel and Roger Ebert on their program At the Movies. Siskel praised Aykroyd's performance in particular, going so far as to say he deserved an Academy Award nomination. Ebert extended this praise to the ensemble cast, although he lamented the lack of stylized camera shots from the original television show and criticized the use of contemporary pop music. Siskel concluded that "they didn't have enough confidence in the material that they had to try and hook kids in with some disco thing."

In his written review, Ebert gave the movie three out of four stars, concluding that "it is great for an hour, good for about 25 minutes and then heads doggedly for the Standard 1980s High Tech Hollywood Ending, which means an expensive chase scene and a shootout." He also added that he felt the film would have been more effective in black and white.

On the review aggregator website Rotten Tomatoes, 50% of 36 critics' reviews are positive, with an average rating of 5.2/10. The website's consensus reads: "While it's sporadically funny and certainly well-cast, Dragnet is too clumsy and inconsistent to honor its classic source material." Metacritic, which uses a weighted average, assigned the film a score of 62 out of 100, based on 17 critics, indicating "generally favorable" reviews. Audiences surveyed by CinemaScore gave the film an average grade of "B−" on an A+ to F scale.

=== Box office ===
Dragnet performed well at the box office, grossing $57.4 million domestically with an additional $9.3 million internationally, for a total of $66.7 million worldwide.
