= Tremors: Shrieker Island =

2020 film by Don Michael Paul

- Promotional release poster
- Directed by: Don Michael Paul
- Screenplay by: Don Michael Paul; Brian Brightly
- Story by: Brian Brightly
- Produced by: Todd Williams
- Starring: Michael Gross; Jon Heder; Caroline Langrishe; Cassie Clare; Jackie Cruz; Richard Brake
- Cinematography: Alexander Krumov
- Edited by: Vanick Moradian
- Music by: Frederik Wiedmann
- Production company: Universal 1440 Entertainment
- Distributed by: Universal Pictures Home Entertainment
- Release date: October 20, 2020
- Running time: 98 minutes
- Country: United States
- Language: English

Tremors: Shrieker Island is a 2020 American direct-to-video horror monster film directed by Don Michael Paul and co-written with Brian Brightly. It is the seventh film in the Tremors franchise. The film stars Michael Gross, Jon Heder, Caroline Langrishe, Cassie Clare, Jackie Cruz, and Richard Brake. The film was released direct-to-video on October 20, 2020, by Universal Pictures Home Entertainment.

== Plot ==
Big game hunter Bill, owner of Avex-Bio Tech, leads a hunting party with his best hunter Anna, where he takes wealthy participants to hunt down Graboids on Dark Island, a private area where he operates his company. Dr. Jasmine 'Jas' Welker and colleague Jimmy work on the research site next to Dark Island, where they were experiencing unnatural seismic vibrations. When Jas sees Bill leaving Dark Island, she, along with Jimmy and her friend Ishimon, starts investigating what Bill was up to and finds a dead Graboid. The Graboid gave birth to Shriekers, which kill Ishimon. After fleeing, Jas instructs Jimmy to use the coordinates provided by her son Travis to find Burt Gummer. She visits Bill's camp and learns that he genetically bred the Graboids on the island, making them more powerful and intelligent for his hunt. He also cut off communications, so nothing would stop him and his hunting party.

Jimmy finds Burt, who has now lived in isolation as a survivalist, away from the government, and is content to be retired from anything related to Graboids. Jimmy says they need his help, and Travis is unavailable after being arrested in Mexico for smuggling shrooms. After learning that Jas is there, Burt refuses to help because of their history and because she kept Travis' birth a secret from him for years. Jimmy, however, manages to change his mind.

Burt gets to meet the crew. Bill shows up to intimidate Burt and tells him to back off from his hunt. Burt, however, is not afraid. While trying to gather weapons, he discovers that they have no firearms to defend themselves, only a bunker from World War II which has machetes, two flamethrowers, and unstable dynamite.

On Dark Island, the Shriekers Jas and Jimmy encountered, like their parent Graboid, are superior to the originals and can now use their screams as sonic weapons, allowing them to pick off Bill's hunting party one by one. The party is saved when Burt and the others arrive, killing the Shriekers and one Graboid, leaving two remaining Graboids. Returning to Jas's research site, they learn that a Graboid reached their location. Burt warns Bill to call off the hunt and turn the communication system back on, but he refuses. Bill tranquilizes Burt and locks him and the others in the bunker.

Bill's hunt continues, but goes wrong when the Graboid that reached Jas's site, dubbed "The Queen" by the hunters due to its superiority, appears. Anna quits when Bill's lust for the hunt proves too dangerous.

Anna frees Burt and the others from the bunker, but they are attacked by a Graboid before they can leave. They use the dynamite to blow it up, leaving only The Queen. Burt locates Bill to reason with him, but cannot convince him to give up his hunt. The Queen eventually finds them and devours Bill. The Queen is killing off the weakest until Burt, who Jimmy points out must be the Alpha, is the only one remaining. Burt gathers the remaining survivors and, inspired by the way his friends Valentine McKee and Earl Bassett killed off an intelligent Graboid in his first encounter with the creatures, (Note: As depicted in the movie Tremors.) they plan to lead The Queen to "Devil's Punchbowl," an inactive volcano, and lure The Queen over a plateau onto a bed of spiked dynamite.

While Jas and the others set up the trap for The Queen, Burt and Jimmy reach Dark Island and begin killing off the Shriekers with the bunker weapons. They return to the research site, where The Queen is waiting for Burt. The team heads to Devil's Punchbowl with Jimmy following behind Burt. The pair are leading The Queen into the trap when Burt pushes Jimmy out of the way and lets himself be swallowed by The Queen to ensure her demise. The Queen dies from the dynamite and spikes, and Burt dies. The others make a memorial for Burt, leaving behind their weapons with his hat and sunglasses.

== Cast ==
- Michael Gross as Burt Gummer
- Jon Heder as Jimmy
- Richard Brake as Bill
- Caroline Langrishe as Jasmine "Jas" Welker
- Jackie Cruz as Freddie
- Cassie Clare as Anna
- Sahajak Boonthanakit as Mr. Bowtie
- Matthew Douglas as Dr. Alistair Richards

== Production ==
On December 13, 2018, Michael Gross confirmed that Universal Pictures had ordered a seventh entry in the series and that he would return to star, stating "Tremors fans will be delighted to know I have just agreed to the terms of a contract for a seventh film. My best estimate is that Burt Gummer will begin his hunt for Graboids and other nefarious forms of wildlife in the fall of 2019."

Principal photography began on November 13, 2019, in Thailand, under the working title of Island Fury, with Alexander Krumov serving as cinematographer. On November 26, 2019, Jon Heder, Jackie Cruz, and Richard Brake signed on to star alongside Gross. On December 12, 2019, Gross confirmed that filming had wrapped. In August 2020, the film was officially titled Tremors: Shrieker Island. Jamie Kennedy, who portrayed Burt Gummer's son Travis B. Welker, in Tremors 5: Bloodlines and Tremors: A Cold Day in Hell, did not reprise the role in Shrieker Island.

== Release ==
Tremors: Shrieker Island was released direct-to-video on October 20, 2020, by Universal Pictures Home Entertainment.

== Reception ==
=== Critical response ===
On the review aggregator website Rotten Tomatoes, 44% of 9 critics' reviews are positive, with an average rating of 5.1/10.

Sol Harris, of Starburst gave the film 3 stars out of 5, feeling that there was "plenty of Graboid action, a handful of great gags and a surprisingly emotional climax ultimately renders Tremors: Shrieker Island closer to perfection than you might think." Josh Bell, of Crooked Marquee, gave the film a "C", saying that while the film "isn't a particularly good movie, it's a nice showcase for a character who has become an unlikely cinematic institution."

In a negative review, John Squires of Bloody Disgusting gave the film 2.5 stars out of 5, saying "There's clearly just not enough money at the disposal of the filmmakers to do anything more with the franchise than they've already done." Roger Moore, of Movie Nation, gave the film a 1.5/4, saying "if you want a scary, tense and hilarious movie about giant worms eating desert California, rent the original Tremors, directed by Ron Underwood, starring Kevin Bacon, Fred Ward, Michael Gross and Reba McEntire. No Shrieker necessary." AllHorror.com also gave a negative review, stating that "Tremors: Shrieker Island did something the Tremors franchise never did before, it became an entirely different movie. Shrieker Island is basically Jurassic Park. Swap out a Graboid for a T-Rex and you have Jurassic Park starring Burt Gummer and Napoleon Dynamite." Clarisse Loughery, of The Independent, gave the film a 2/5, saying "It may speak eloquently to its fanbase, but it's guaranteed to baffle any outsider".

=== Revenue ===
Tremors: Shrieker Island earned $2,348,198 from domestic home video sales.

== Possible sequel ==
In a podcast with Bloody Disgusting, Gross mentioned that "part of me that feels that Universal Home Entertainment might've had enough of Tremors", though he followed up by saying "The door is still open for an eighth Tremors. It may seem unlikely by what people see on the screen, but it is possible. There could be an eighth. And if there were, and if it were an interesting story, I would be up for it because Burt is always a great deal of fun. It would depend on his physicality. How much they want me to do. If it's in another two years, I'll be 75 years old. So I will continue to hope and pray that I stay in shape, to do what is asked of me – if it is asked of me". Gross later said on Facebook "There are no guarantees, but for those who wonder aloud if this is the final film, I will say what I have said before: SALES drive sequels. Show biz is 5% show and 95% business, so if this latest addition to the Tremors franchise, sells well, Universal Studios Hollywood will follow the money, and Universal Pictures Home Entertainment may will [sic] be back for more". In April 2025, it was announced that Stampede Entertainment had won the rights to the franchise back.
