= Tremors (1990 film) =

Film by Ron Underwood

- Theatrical release poster
- Directed by: Ron Underwood
- Screenplay by: S. S. Wilson; Brent Maddock
- Story by: S. S. Wilson; Brent Maddock; Ron Underwood
- Produced by: Brent Maddock; S. S. Wilson
- Starring: Kevin Bacon; Fred Ward; Finn Carter; Michael Gross; Reba McEntire
- Cinematography: Alexander Gruszynski
- Edited by: O. Nicholas Brown
- Music by: Ernest Troost (Note: Additional music by Robert Folk)
- Production companies: No Frills Productions; Pacific Western Productions
- Distributed by: Universal Pictures
- Release date: January 19, 1990
- Running time: 96 minutes
- Country: United States
- Language: English
- Budget: $5–11 million
- Box office: $16.7 million (U.S.)

Tremors is a 1990 American monster movie directed by Ron Underwood (in his feature directorial debut) and written by S. S. Wilson and Brent Maddock, from a story by Wilson, Maddock, and Underwood. The film stars Kevin Bacon, Fred Ward, Finn Carter, Michael Gross, and Reba McEntire (in her acting debut). Set in the fictional isolated desert town of Perfection, Nevada, it follows handymen Valentine "Val" McKee and Earl Bassett as they and the town's residents confront giant subterranean worms dubbed Graboids.

Conceived as a modern variation on 1950s monster films, Tremors was designed around ordinary protagonists rather than conventional genre heroes, while its monsters were deliberately left without a fixed origin. Filmed in Inyo County, California, with an extensive desert set built to represent Perfection, the production relied heavily on practical creature effects and miniature work. It distinguished itself by staging much of its monster action in broad daylight. Its music underwent major revision during post-production: Ernest Troost composed the initial score, but Robert Folk later wrote much of the music used in the released film.

Released in the United States on January 19, 1990, Tremors debuted in fifth place at the box office and grossed $16.7 million against a $5–11 million budget. It received generally positive reviews from critics, who described it as an affectionate and entertaining update of 1950s monster films. Although the film underperformed at the box office, it later found a larger audience through the video rental market, where repeat viewing helped it develop a cult following. In the decades since its release, Tremors has received largely favorable retrospective reviews and has appeared on several rankings of the best monster films of all time and the top horror films of the 1990s.

The film's later popularity led to a long-running franchise comprising six direct-to-video sequels—Tremors 2: Aftershocks (1996), Tremors 3: Back to Perfection (2001), Tremors 4: The Legend Begins (2004), Tremors 5: Bloodlines (2015), Tremors: A Cold Day in Hell (2018), and Tremors: Shrieker Island (2020)—and a television series, with Gross serving as the franchise's mainstay. A TV series reboot of Tremors starring Bacon did not go beyond the pilot stage. In 2025, Underwood, Maddock, and Wilson regained the rights to the original Tremors script and began discussing a new sequel that would return to Perfection.

== Plot ==
In the isolated desert town of Perfection Valley, Nevada, handymen Valentine "Val" McKee and Earl Bassett decide to leave for the nearby town of Bixby after growing dissatisfied with their work. Before they can depart, they discover resident Edgar Deems dead atop an electrical tower. The town doctor determines that he died of dehydration after refusing to come down. Soon afterwards, a shepherd and his flock are killed by an unseen creature. When Val and Earl find the shepherd's severed head, they suspect a serial killer is at large. Two road workers are then killed, and a rockslide blocks the only road out of town. The men return to warn the residents, only to find that the phone lines are dead as well. During another attempt to leave, a snake-like creature wraps around their truck's rear axle and is torn apart as they drive away.

Val and Earl then ride horseback toward Bixby for help. On the way, they find the doctor's station wagon buried near his camper, with the doctor and his wife missing. A giant, burrowing, worm-like creature suddenly erupts from the ground, revealing that the earlier snake-like creature was one of its tentacled tongues. With the men thrown from their horses, it pursues them until it crashes into the concrete wall of a culvert and dies. They are soon joined by Rhonda LeBeck, a graduate student studying seismic activity, who concludes that three more creatures are in the area. Stranded overnight on boulders, the three realize that the creatures hunt by sensing vibrations in the ground. Using discarded poles, they jump between rocks and eventually escape in Rhonda's truck.

After returning to Perfection, they warn the remaining residents, and the creatures—which Walter Chang, the store owner, names "Graboids"—attack again and kill Walter, forcing the townspeople onto rooftops. Elsewhere, survivalist couple Burt and Heather Gummer kill one Graboid after it breaks into their basement armory. Back in town, the two remaining Graboids undermine buildings and kill town resident Nestor when his trailer collapses. The survivors attempt to escape to the nearby mountains using a track loader towing a trailer, but the Graboids trap the vehicle in a sinkhole. Taking refuge on boulders, the survivors follow Earl's plan to lure the creatures into swallowing homemade pipe bombs. One is killed, but the last spits a bomb back, destroying all but one of the remaining explosives. Val then uses the last bomb to drive the last Graboid over a cliff, killing it. The survivors return to town and contact the authorities, and Earl encourages Val to pursue a relationship with Rhonda.

== Cast ==
- Kevin Bacon as Valentine "Val" McKee, a local handyman who does odd jobs around town with his partner Earl
- Fred Ward as Earl Bassett, Val's partner in the handyman business
- Finn Carter as Rhonda LeBeck, a student seismologist and Val's eventual love interest
- Michael Gross as Burt Gummer, a gun-toting survivalist and right-wing conspiracy theorist
- Víctor Wong as Walter Chang
- Bobby Jacoby as Melvin Plug
- Ariana Richards as Mindy
- Reba McEntire as Heather Gummer
- Charlotte Stewart as Nancy
- Tony Genaro as Miguel
- Richard Marcus as Nestor
- Bibi Besch as Megan, the doctor's wife
- Conrad Bachmann as Jim, the doctor

== Production ==
=== Development ===
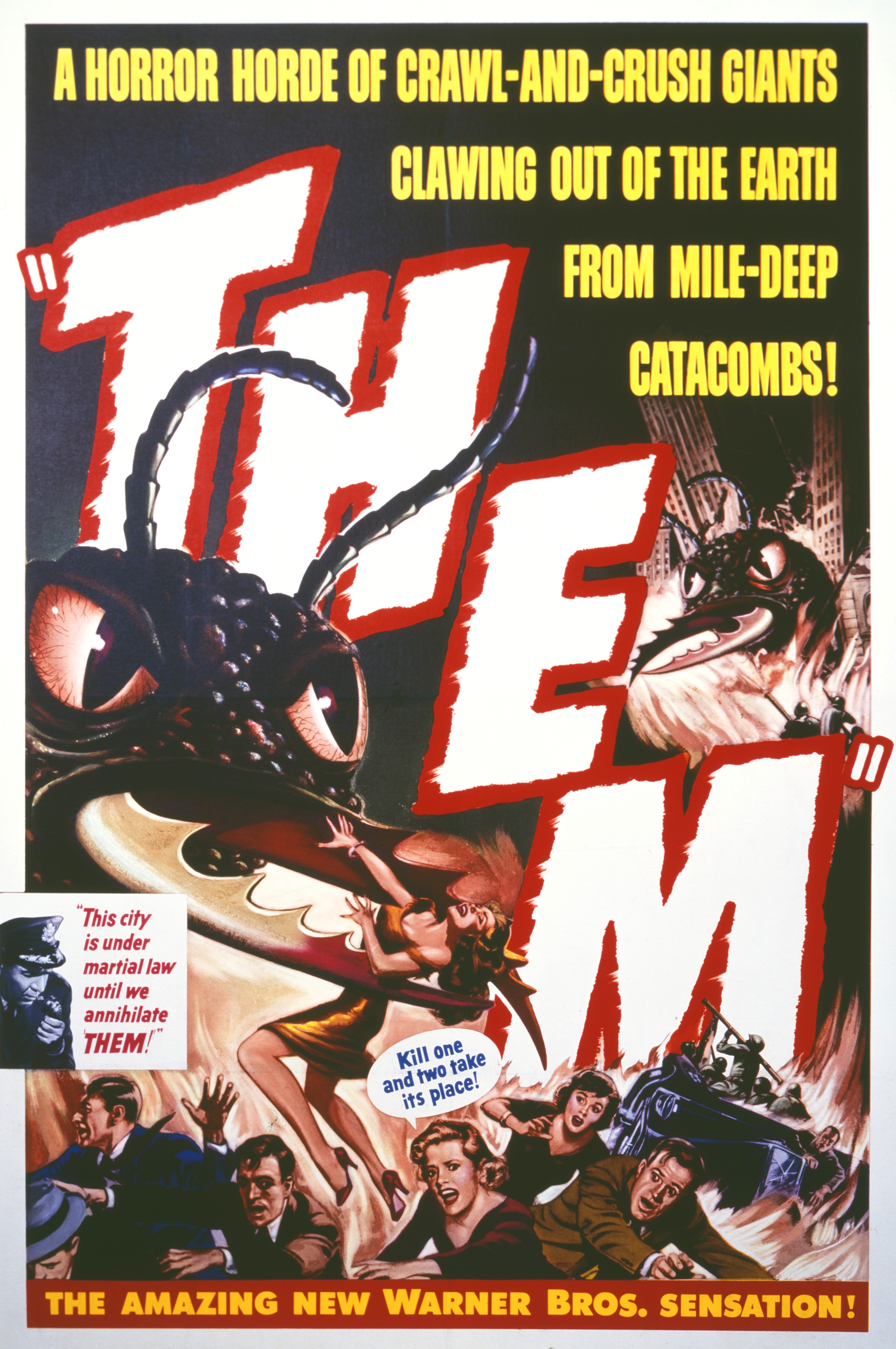
Tremors was conceived by the filmmakers as an homage to 1950s monster films, including Them! (1954), which was shot in black-and-white, by contrast.

Tremors originated from a story credited to S. S. Wilson, Brent Maddock, and Ron Underwood, with Wilson and Maddock receiving screenplay credit. Gale Anne Hurd served as executive producer, while Pacific Western Productions handled the film as a non-union acquisition for Paramount Pictures before Universal Pictures released it. Wilson and Maddock wrote Tremors as an uncommissioned script, which carried the original title Beneath Perfection. Because Underwood was responsible for giving them careers in educational films, they lobbied to get him onboard the project in return, seeing Tremors as an opportunity to finally work with him after failing to do so for Short Circuit (1986). Hurd backed the film after responding strongly to the script and supported Underwood as director in his feature directorial debut.

Underwood, Wilson, and Maddock approached the project as a contemporary variation on 1950s monster films, combining a traditional monster premise with more contemporary character comedy. Wilson said that the premise originated while he was working as a film editor at a naval base in the Mojave Desert. During weekend hikes near the gunnery ranges, he imagined being stranded on a rock while a creature moved beneath the ground, and that image became the basis for the film's central idea. Maddock distinguished the script by making the protagonists two ordinary men rather than the lawman, soldier, or scientist more commonly used in the genre. The writers also chose not to give the Graboids a stated origin, since Wilson considered the usual science fiction explanations too familiar.

=== Pre-production ===
The film entered pre-production under the working title Land Sharks, which was eventually dropped after the filmmakers found that Saturday Night Live had already popularized the Land Shark character intended to parody Jaws (1975). The project briefly carried the alternate title Dead Silence. Dr. Kate Hutton served as the film's seismology consultant.

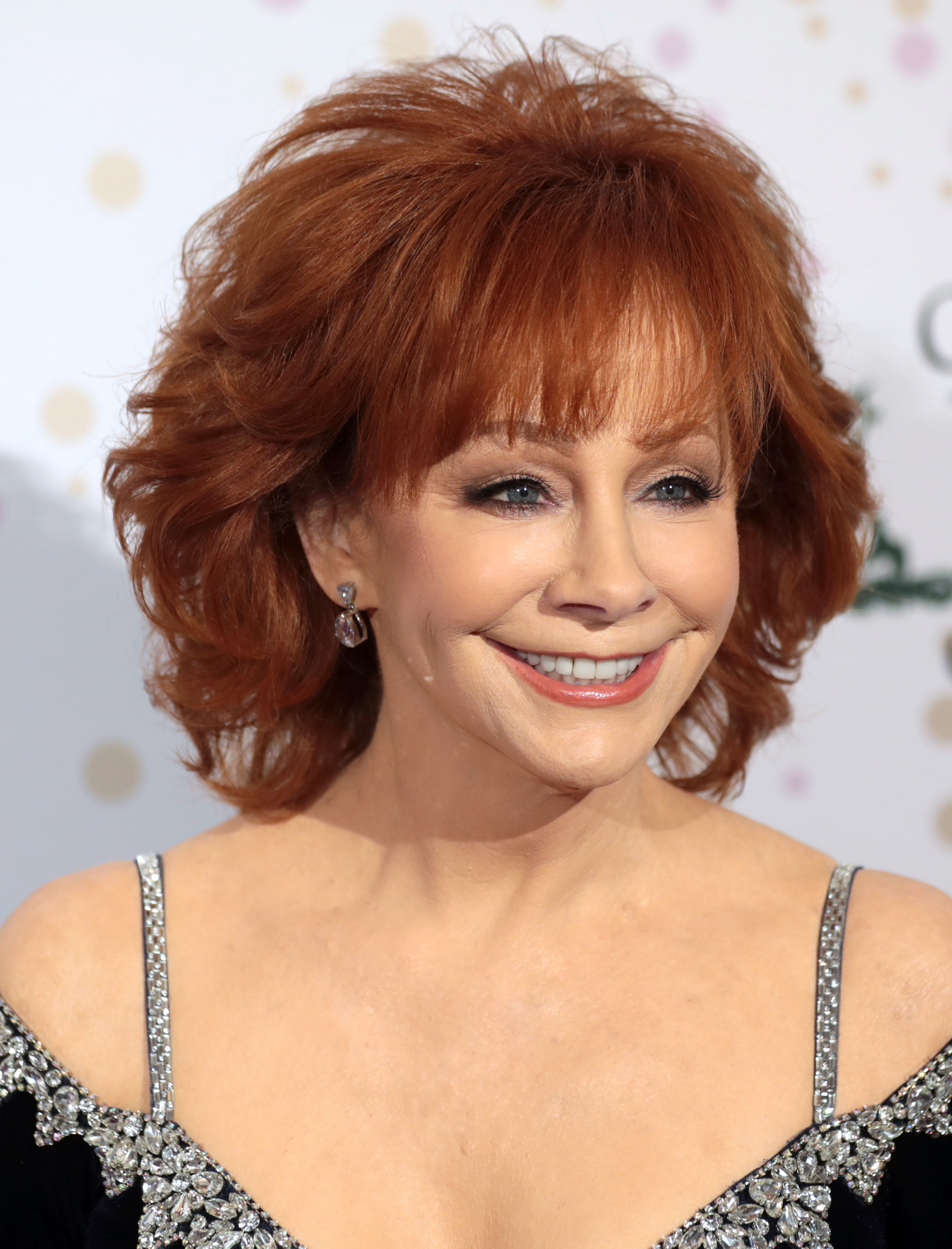
The country singer Reba McEntire (pictured here in 2022) made her acting debut with Tremors.

Pam Dixon served as the casting director, and the production assembled a principal cast that included Kevin Bacon, Fred Ward, Finn Carter, Michael Gross, and Reba McEntire. Gross began work on the film one day after the TV series Family Ties ended. McEntire, a country singer, made her acting debut in the production, postponing her honeymoon until the end of the shoot as a result. The role of Walter Chang was originally written as a Vietnamese character named Phan Vam, but the filmmakers changed the role to Chinese before Victor Wong auditioned.

Production designer Ivo Cristante spent two months constructing the fictional town of Perfection, Nevada, in the desert near Olancha, California. The finished set included a market, a paved street, telephone poles, a garbage dump, a horse corral, and several houses and mobile homes. Other sites were considered before the production settled on the Lone Pine area, which offered the Sierra Nevada mountains in the background and the Alabama Hills in the foreground. Several building frames were first constructed in Los Angeles and then moved to the location, and Cristante also created the large rock formation used in the climax.

Alec Gillis and Tom Woodruff Jr. of Amalgamated Dynamics are credited with designing and creating the creature effects, which they achieved as practically as possible. In contrast, Robert and Dennis Skotak provided the visual and miniature effects, and Art Brewer Special Effects Inc. created the special mechanical effects. The effects team built large puppet heads, mechanical tentacles, miniatures, and matte effects so that the creatures could be shown convincingly in broad daylight.

=== Filming ===
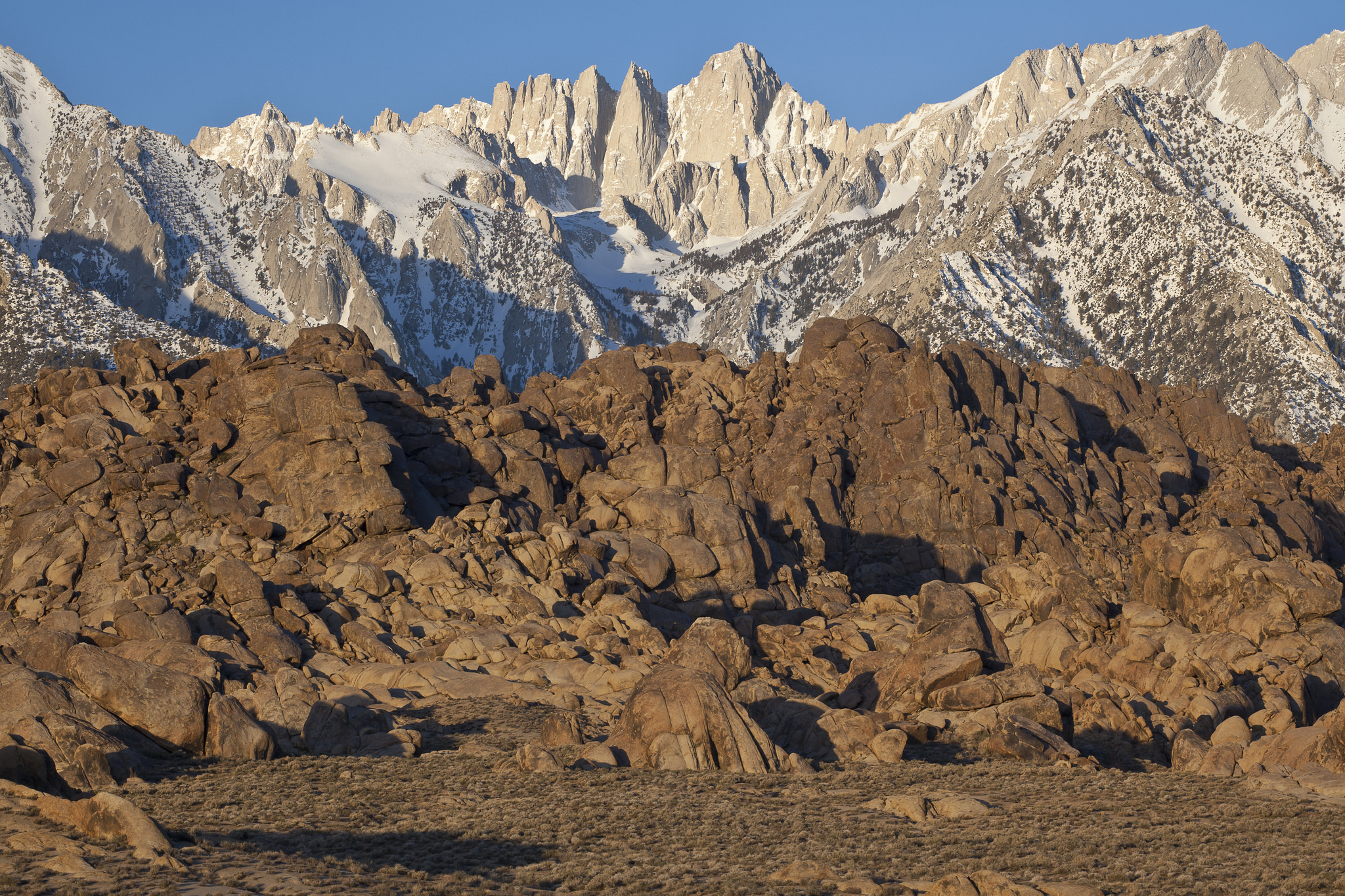
The Alabama Hills Recreation Area (pictured here in 2016), where Tremors was filmed almost entirely on location

With a budget of $5–11 million, filming began in April 1989 and took place in Inyo County, California, around Lone Pine, Olancha, and the Alabama Hills. The film was a non-union production. Much of the 54-day shoot was split between location work in the Lone Pine desert and studio work in Valencia, California. Two interior sets, Burt and Heather Gummer's basement and Walter Chang's market, were built at Valencia Studios, where the final scenes were shot and the production wrapped filming.

A major visual choice was to stage much of the film in broad daylight, rather than conceal the creatures in darkness, a deliberate departure from many earlier low-light monster films. As such, the filmmakers identify the bright exterior photography as one of the production's main technical challenges. Weather posed a problem during location shooting, with rain, snow, and strong winds complicating action scenes in the desert.

McEntire's participation required logistical adjustments during filming. She toured on weekends, then took two flights and a drive to reach the set for early morning call times. For a running scene near the end of the film, her firearm was replaced with a wooden prop to make it easier to carry.

The ending was changed after preview audiences wanted the romantic subplot between Val and Rhonda resolved with a kiss, prompting Underwood to reshoot the final moments.

=== Post-production ===
O. Nicholas Brown was the film's editor. Other credits include Ernest Troost as composer and conductor, Ralph Sall as music supervisor, and Steve Flick and Richard Anderson as supervising sound editors. The creature work was completed with additional miniature and visual effects, which complemented the large-scale practical puppets used during principal photography.

The film's original opening sequence, which incorporated real earthquake footage, was removed after test audiences responded negatively. The film's rating was also adjusted after the first cut. The initial version received an R rating for language, after which the filmmakers made edits to secure a PG-13 rating while retaining a single use of the word "fuck". (Note: The Motion Picture Association (MPA) allows a single use of the word "fuck" in PG-13 films, provided that it is done so in non-sexual contexts. The film utilizes this rule for the scene where Val curses at a dead Graboid.)

Post-production included a substantial change to the score. Troost composed the initial score, but Robert Folk later wrote much of the music used in the released film.

== Music ==
Troost was the first composer hired for Tremors after producer Ginny Nugent recommended him to the filmmakers. He joined while the film was still in production, then worked with Ron Underwood and Brent Maddock during post-production to assemble the temporary score for a preview cut, which also used some of his earlier cues. Troost said there was no distinct spotting session because the music placement was largely set as the temp track was built. His original plan used two recurring ideas: a blues-influenced rock theme for Val and Earl, and a separate action-driven science fiction theme for the Graboids. After discussions that the monster material was too forceful, he rewrote it in a more restrained style, a choice he later came to regret. He also said that much of his score was ultimately replaced as the filmmakers continued adjusting the film's tone.

Folk was brought in later through producer Gale Anne Hurd, who knew his manager Larry Marks. He said he was told that the earlier score would remain only in selected scenes, after which he spotted the film with the production team and wrote about 30 to 40 minutes of new music that could also be tracked into other parts of the picture. Working on a three-and-a-half-week schedule, he was asked for a broader, more action-oriented sound with a tongue-in-cheek horror tone, and he said he had not heard the earlier score. Folk treated Val and Earl's friendship as the score's emotional center, writing a theme for their optimism that appeared in rock, tender, and full orchestral versions. He also singled out Tommy Morgan's harmonica in "Mad Sheeps", a retro-styled synthesizer blended with orchestra in "Burt's Big Gun", and a revised pole-vault cue written after Underwood wanted that sequence to feel more uplifting.

Troost said that Folk, through his agent, refused to share credit with Troost for the latter's having contributed a substantial amount of music to the film. Troost declined an "additional music" credit in favor of shared billing, believing that his and Folk's work shaped the film's final musical identity. Even so, Troost was ultimately awarded sole credit for his contribution, as per a clause in his contract, to which Folk is quoted as saying, "He must have had a very good lawyer".

== Creature effects design ==
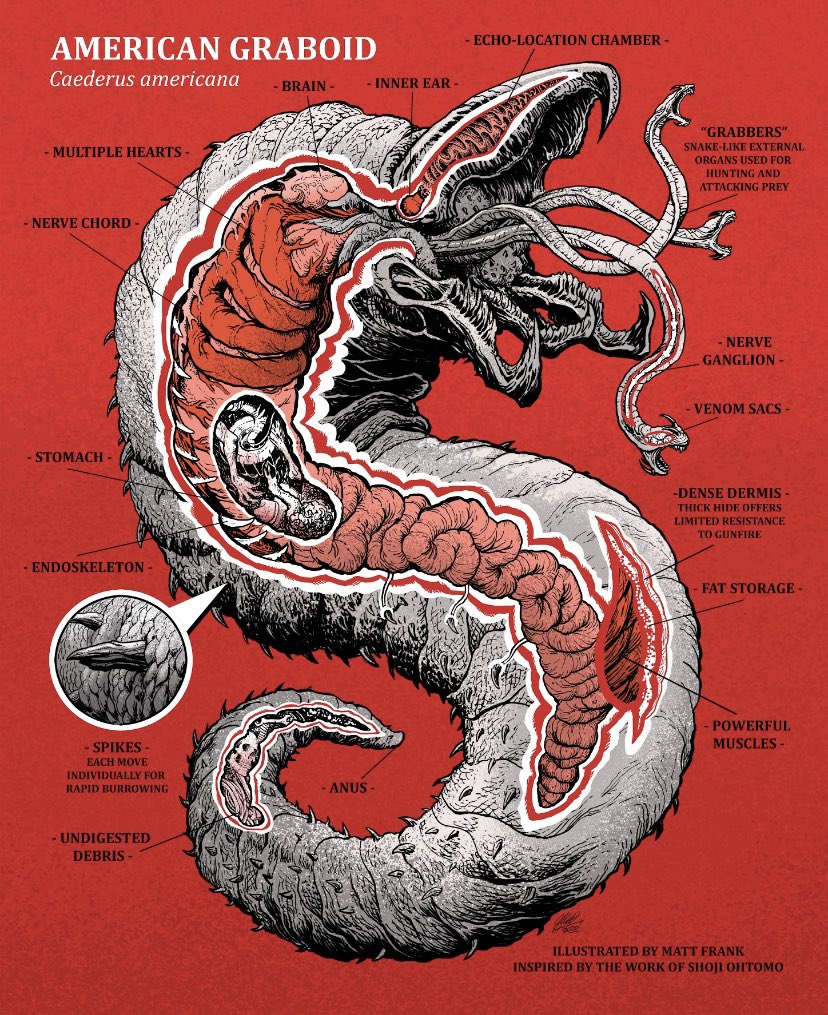
An illustration of a Graboid's anatomy by the artist Matt Frank

The creature effects for Tremors were created by Alec Gillis and Tom Woodruff Jr. of Amalgamated Dynamics, with miniature work by Robert and Dennis Skotak of 4-Ward Productions. The screenplay described the monster only in broad terms—including a mouth that opened like a grotesque flower, tentacles inside the mouth, and spines across the body—so, the final look was shaped during pre-production rather than derived from a fixed design. Gillis said the design team worked from reference textures and shapes that interested them. They deliberately avoided making the creatures resemble the sandworms in Dune (1984) or a conventional giant worm. The main Graboid head was built in Los Angeles and its form drew on studies of rhinoceroses, elephants, and prehistoric animals. The orange innards used in splatter scenes included canned pumpkin, which contributed to the innards' color on screen.

For the full-scale effects, the crew built four articulated head sections and a separate non-articulated body for the dead Graboid found in the concrete culvert. The head sections used foam latex skins over an internal structure, with fiberglass jaw and mandible components and mechanical linkages that allowed the mouth to snap, lunge, and turn. One major rig placed the head over a deep pit, where operators below and above the set controlled its gross movement and facial articulation through rods and cables. Another buried rig used a pneumatic elevator to drive the creature upward through a false ground surface dressed with foam, sand, and vermiculite for the eruption shots. After the creature emerged, it could be attached to a rolling dolly rig suspended from a crane for shots in which it moved across the set, including the general store and basement sequences.

The tentacles from inside the mouth became the defining part of the final design. During development, the filmmakers moved away from the idea that the monsters were simply giant underground snakes and instead treated the tentacles as grasping oral appendages belonging to a much larger animal. Gillis and Woodruff built several cable-operated tentacles of different lengths, including ten-foot versions for wide shots, a smaller articulated head variant for close-ups, and hand-puppet versions that gave the crew finer control during snapping and grabbing shots. The mouth mechanism was redesigned with compound hinges so it could open wider, and some tentacle shots were staged for reverse photography so the appendages could appear to dart outward more sharply on screen.

As production continued, the film relied more heavily on miniatures because the full-scale creatures were difficult to control. The Skotaks built five quarter-scale puppets, including one principal articulated version and several simpler hand puppets, along with smaller tentacle units for miniature work. These were used in forced-perspective desert table tops, miniature interior sets, and cliff effects that extended the creatures' screen presence beyond what the full-scale rigs could do reliably. The production later added more miniature creature shots after a positive rough-cut screening, and the final effects package was completed with optical composites, underground point-of-view shots, and matte paintings that extended the desert and cliff environments.

== Release ==
=== Box office ===
Tremors opened on January 19, 1990, in 1,457 theaters against no other new releases and debuted at number five at the U.S. box office, behind Born on the Fourth of July, Tango & Cash, The War of the Roses, and Internal Affairs, grossing $3.7 million in its opening weekend. It dropped to sixth in its second week but stayed in the top 10 for four weeks before finally dropping to eleventh in its fifth week. Grossing $16.7 million in the U.S., the film was a box-office failure. (Note: Attributed to multiple references:) English film critic and journalist Kim Newman considered it "modestly profitable". Audiences polled by CinemaScore reported that moviegoers gave the film an average letter grade of B−.

=== Critical response ===
Critical reception to Tremors was generally positive upon its release. Much of the early response judged the film by how persuasively it revived the 1950s creature feature, and several reviewers treated the film as an affectionate update rather than a spoof. (Note: Attributed to multiple references:) The Telegram & Gazette called the film a throwback to the era of giant monster films, The Boston Globe described it as a fun return to 1950s science fiction, and USA Today wrote that it honored the genre while adding fresh twists. The Chicago Tribune and the Los Angeles Times also placed the film within a familiar desert-siege tradition, with each review stressing that its monster-movie framework drew strength from western imagery as well as postwar science fiction.

The warmer responses often turned on the film's control of tone, since its humor was seen as part of the entertainment rather than a release from it. (Note: Attributed to multiple references:) The St. Louis Post-Dispatch called the film a horror played with wit and style, the Sun-Sentinel argued that humor elevated it beyond "pure schlock", and the Edmonton Journal praised it for remaining tense without losing sight of the absurdity of its premise. The Globe and Mail likewise described it as a 50s-style monster film with a campy comic sense that landed more often than it missed, while the Telegram & Gazette noted that the balance of laughs and scares kept it from tipping into either parody or splatter.

Positive reviews also linked that response to execution, especially the way the film established clear rules for its creatures and kept a modest premise moving. (Note: Attributed to multiple references:) The Chicago Tribune credited director Ron Underwood's focus on character and his carefully accelerating pace, USA Today pointed to the screenplay's clever isolation of Perfection and its restrained gore, and The Boston Globe found that much of the film's appeal came from the inventive ways the trapped townspeople fought back. The Los Angeles Times noted the Graboids' speed, cunning, and specific weakness, which framed the action as a battle of wits, while the Edmonton Journal highlighted the choice to stage much of the action in broad daylight and show the creatures clearly rather than hide them in darkness.

The negative reviews, by contrast, treated that same retro design as a limitation, arguing that the film was either too predictable or too pleased with its own jokiness. (Note: Attributed to multiple references:) The Northwest Florida Daily News found the story predictable and argued that the jokes were too slight for a film whose horror never fully carried the material. The New York Times made a related complaint, writing that the film "wants to be funny but spent too much time winking at the audience". Even several generally favorable notices had reservations: the Calgary Herald called the script corny despite praising the film's western look, the Telegram & Gazette suggested that its appeal would likely remain strongest among horror and science-fiction fans, and The Globe and Mail treated it as lively but lightweight genre entertainment.

== Post-release ==
=== Post-mortems ===
According to author Jonathan Melville, in a 2020 essay on the Tremors franchise, Universal was "unsure whether to sell the film as horror-with-laughs or comedy-with-scares", hence its poor box-office returns. Both S. S. Wilson and Brent Maddock also blamed the commercial performance on its marketing campaign. Maddock, in particular, thought the theatrical trailer was "cringeworthy" and likely deterred audiences. Conversely, English film critic and journalist Kim Newman wrote, "Some blame the marketing, but the posters and trailers look fine to me." Although Tremors fared poorly at the box office, it became popular in the 1990s video rental market, where repeat viewing helped it develop a cult following.

Bacon initially viewed Tremors as a low point in his acting career; he had taken the role while under financial and family pressure. In 2022, however, he described his work on the film as a positive experience, citing his time working with co-star Fred Ward and the film's practical effects. In 2021, Bacon said that Tremors was the only film from his own filmography that he was interested in revisiting, and the only one he had watched again since its original release. He had declined an earlier direct-to-video sequel, but later tried to revive the property around the film's 25th anniversary with Blumhouse Productions. Although his concept did not move forward, Bacon said that he remained open to reprising his role. In addition, when Ward died in 2022, Bacon honored his memory by tweeting, "When it came to battling underground worms, I couldn't have asked for a better partner."

=== Home media ===
On July 12, 1990, Tremors was released on VHS by MCA/Universal Home Video. MCA/Universal released the film alongside its direct-to-video sequel Tremors 2: Aftershocks on a Signature Collection special-edition LaserDisc on April 16, 1996, followed by a DVD version on April 29, 1998.

On November 9, 2010, Tremors was released on Blu-ray by Universal Studios Home Entertainment, with bonus material carried over from the film's HD DVD version, including a behind-the-scenes featurette. In 2020, a 4K resolution restoration was released on Ultra HD Blu-ray by Arrow Video. The restoration was created using the original camera negative, and was overseen by director Ron Underwood and cinematographer Alexander Gruszynski. The commentary track for this Blu-ray marked Underwood's, Wilson's, and Maddock's first for a Tremors home video release. On August 29, 2024, Universal released all seven films in the Tremors series in a Blu-ray collection.

In 1999, a soundtrack album of Ernest Troost's score was released on CD by Intrada Records. In 2020, La-La Land Records gave Troost's and Robert Folk's score its first commercial release as a limited-edition, two-disc set.

=== Other media ===
A novelization entitled Beneath Perfection, based on Wilson and Maddock's original script, was published by Christian Francis in 2025. Its audiobook version is narrated by Zoran Gvojic, who co-hosts the YouTube channel Dead Meat.

== Legacy ==
=== Retrospective assessment ===
It has its scares, but it's a little more human. Part of the reason I think it didn't do as well when it came out was the horror films at that time were very dark, very scary, and this film was lighter because it had people that you cared about who had a lightness to them and a sense of humor despite the awful situation they were in.

— Director Ron Underwood in 2020 on the contemporary and retrospective receptions of Tremors

Reviews for Tremors have remained generally favorable in the decades since its release. On the review aggregator website Rotten Tomatoes, 88% of 56 critics' reviews are positive. The website's consensus reads: "An affectionate throwback to 1950s creature features, Tremors reinvigorates its genre tropes with a finely balanced combination of horror and humor." Metacritic, which uses a weighted average, assigned the film a score of 65 out of 100, based on 13 critics, indicating "generally favorable" reviews.

Retrospective coverage has generally treated Tremors as an unusually durable creature feature whose reputation strengthened after its theatrical release. (Note: Attributed to multiple references:) A Rotten Tomatoes essay by Jessica Kiang argued that the film was built to last and has become more beloved over time, while Jennifer Ouellette, writing for Ars Technica, elevated it within the B-movie creature-feature tradition and noted that its modest box office showing gave way to a large cult following. Film critic and journalist Kim Newman also judged it entertaining enough to endure, and Den of Geek's Kyle Phaneuf linked its longevity to its later success on VHS and late-night television. Slashfilm likewise treated the Graboids as memorable because the film makes giant subterranean worms feel genuinely dangerous through their strength, patience, and vibration-sensing attacks.

Tremors has made several lists of the best monster films of all time, including those of GamesRadar+ (no. 7), Rolling Stone (no. 14), Screen Rant (no. 18), Entertainment Weekly (no. 23), and Paste (no. 32). Similarly, the film's Graboids have been ranked as one of the best movie monsters by Time Out (no. 32), Esquire, and Slashfilm. The film has made rankings of the top horror films of the 1990s, including Rotten Tomatoes (no. 6), SlashFilm (no. 10), GameSpot (no. 12), Den of Geek, Fangoria, and IGN. Rotten Tomatoes ranked Tremors no. 106 on its list of the 200 Best Horror Movies of All Time, while Entertainment Weekly placed it among the 25 films with the best special effects.

=== Cultural influence ===
Some filmmakers have spoken of their appreciation for Tremors or cited its influence on their own work, including Jerrold Tarog, Gigi Saul Guerrero, Edgar Wright, and James Gunn. Gunn has included a visual reference to Tremors in his comedy horror film Slither (2006), where a high school is named after Fred Ward's character.

The Museum of Western Film History in Lone Pine, California, has an exhibit dedicated to Tremors that "includes Graboids, Shriekers and a replica of the town, Perfection, Nevada".

=== Sequels and television series ===
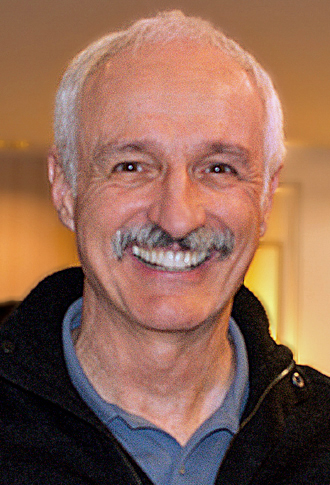
Michael Gross (pictured here in 2015) has consistently appeared in later instalments in the Tremors series.

The film's popularity on home video led Universal to revisit the property for the direct-to-video market. Sequel plans were under discussion by the early 1990s, and Tremors 2: Aftershocks was released in 1996, for which Fred Ward reprised his role as Earl Bassett. That was followed by Tremors 3: Back to Perfection in 2001, which further reconnected the franchise to the original film through returning characters, including Michael Gross as Burt Gummer, and renewed attention to the town of Perfection.

Frequent cable screenings of Tremors 3 helped lead to the TV series Tremors, which debuted in 2003. The 13-part series continued the story after the third film and centered on Burt in Perfection, with an albino Graboid carried over from Tremors 3, "El Blanco", as the ongoing presence in the town. The series suffered from episodes airing out of order and from limited creator involvement in final editing, and it ended after one season.

A fourth film, Tremors 4: The Legend Begins, followed in 2004. It was conceived as a prequel set in 1889, so that a new film could be produced without conflicting with the continuity of the TV series then in production. By shifting to an earlier period, the franchise continued while preserving the events already established on television.

After a long gap, the film series returned with Tremors 5: Bloodlines in 2015, Tremors: A Cold Day in Hell in 2018, and Tremors: Shrieker Island in 2020. Since headlining Tremors 3, Gross has been a mainstay in the series, with later sequels continuing to use Burt as the clearest link back to the original film.

The sequels expanded the creature mythology introduced in the original film. Tremors 2 and Tremors 3 added new stages to the Graboid life cycle—the Shriekers and the Ass Blasters—while Tremors 3 introduced "El Blanco", which later became central to the television series.

== Future ==
After Bacon's concept for a theatrical reboot of Tremors did not move forward with Universal in 2015, it was redeveloped as a television series and later taken to networks such as Syfy, but it did not go beyond the pilot stage. This unbroadcast project proposed a version of Val living in Perfection twenty-five years after the original and ignored the continuity established by the earlier sequels. The pilot, directed by Vincenzo Natali from a teleplay by his Cube (1997) actor Andrew Miller, reportedly generated positive reactions from some viewers who saw the trailer, though it was neither aired nor picked up.

In April 2025, Ron Underwood, Brent Maddock, and S. S. Wilson at Stampede Entertainment regained the rights to the original Tremors script under a provision of U.S. copyright law that allows creators to recover rights after 35 years. With this, they intended to continue developing the property and were discussing a sequel that would return to Perfection. Additional concepts under consideration included a more unconventional story idea centered on Graboids, and another featuring Bacon's return to the series.
