= How I Got into College =

1989 film by Savage Steve Holland

How I Got Into College
- Theatrical release poster
- Directed by: Savage Steve Holland
- Written by: Terrel Seltzer
- Produced by: Elizabeth Cantillon; Michael Shamberg
- Starring: Anthony Edwards; Corey Parker; Lara Flynn Boyle; Finn Carter
- Cinematography: Robert Elswit
- Edited by: Kaja Fehr; Sonya Sones
- Music by: Joseph Vitarelli
- Distributed by: 20th Century Fox
- Release date: May 19, 1989
- Running time: 86 minutes
- Country: United States
- Language: English
- Budget: $10 million
- Box office: $1,642,239 (USA)

How I Got Into College is a 1989 American romantic comedy film directed by Savage Steve Holland, starring Anthony Edwards, Corey Parker and Lara Flynn Boyle, and produced and released by 20th Century Fox. This is the film debut of eventual voice actor Tom Kenny, who would become best known as the voice of SpongeBob SquarePants.

== Plot ==
The story follows two high school seniors from Michigan on their quest to get into Ramsey College, a small college in Pennsylvania: popular and talented Jessica, and unnoticed underachiever Marlon. Jessica wants to break free of both her high school image and her family's near-maniacal devotion to the University of Michigan, while Marlon simply wants to go to whatever college Jessica is going to because he's completely in love with her. Jessica and Marlon go from being in completely different orbits to slowly becoming friends and then romantic interests for each other. The battle lines at Ramsey are drawn between a priggish administrator named Leo who wants to make SAT scores the entire arbiter of who gets in, and good hearted Ramsey alums-turned-Admissions officers Kip and Nina, who feel that SAT scores are important but not the whole or even the main story behind any applicants. Side stories involve two African-American high school seniors in Detroit (one a natural leader whose father died when she was younger, the other a very talented football player whose desire to expand his intellectual horizons is ignored by everyone), Marlon's college-eschewing best friend Oliver, a conniving pair of untalented "SAT tutors", and the battle between Leo and Kip/Nina to get a great class of students to Ramsey.

== Cast ==
- Corey Parker as Marlon Browne
- Lara Flynn Boyle as Jessica Kailo
- Anthony Edwards as Kip Hammett
- Finn Carter as Nina Sachie
- Charles Rocket as Leo Whitman
- Christopher Rydell as Oliver
- Brian Doyle-Murray as Coach Evans
- O-Lan Jones as Sall O'Connor
- Tichina Arnold as Vera Cook
- Bruce Wagner as "A"
- Tom Kenny as "B"
- Bill Raymond as Flutter
- Philip Baker Hall as Dean Patterson
- Nicolas Coster as Dr. Phillip Jellinak Sr.
- Richard Jenkins as Bill Browne
- Phil Hartman as Bennedict
- Nora Dunn as Francine Bauer
- Duane Davis as Ronny "Sure Hands" Rawlson
- Diane Franklin as Sharon Browne
- Robert Ridgely as George Kailo
- Micole Mercurio as Betty Kailo
- Bill Henderson as Detroit High School Coach
- Richard Steven Horvitz as Young Energizer
- Curtis Armstrong as Arcadia Bible Academy Recruiter
- Taylor Negron as Mailman
- Dan Schneider as Pessimistic Boy (uncredited)

== Production ==
Jan Eliasberg started directing but was fired five days into filming and replaced with Savage Steve Holland. Production on the film commenced in February 1988, actress Lara Flynn Boyle left production briefly in March 1988 to film reshoots for the ending of Poltergeist III.

== Reception ==
=== Critical response ===
The review aggregator website Rotten Tomatoes has rated it at 50%.

=== Box office ===
The film was a box office bomb, making just $651,850 in its opening weekend from 743 theaters for an average of $877 per venue. It ended its run with only $1,642,239 domestically.
