= Michael Gross (actor) =

American actor

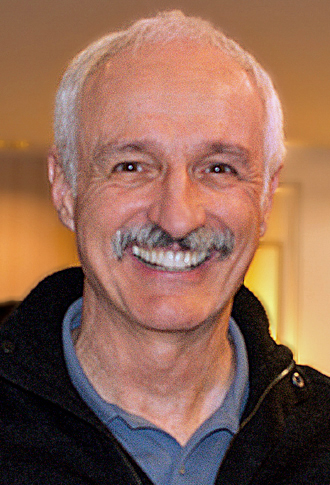
- Gross in 2015
- Occupation: Actor
- Years active: 1975–present
- Spouse: Elza Bergeron (m. 1984)
- Children: Two stepchildren
- Relatives: Mary Gross (sister)

Michael Gross (born June 21, 1947) is an American television, film, and stage actor. He is notable for playing Steven Keaton on the sitcom Family Ties (1982–1989) and survivalist Burt Gummer in the Tremors film franchise, being the only actor to appear in all the films and the television show.

== Early life ==
Gross is the son of Virginia Ruth Gross, a telephone operator, and William O. Gross. Gross and his younger sister, Mary, were raised Catholic. He attended St. Francis Xavier and St. Genevieve schools in Chicago in his early years, graduating from the latter in 1961.

== Career ==
Gross was first seen by a broad audience in his role as Steven Keaton in the 1980s sitcom Family Ties. However, his longest-running role has been Burt Gummer in the Tremors franchise, having played the role for 30 years from the release of the original Tremors in 1990 to Tremors: Shrieker Island in 2020. His performance in Tremors 3: Back to Perfection earned him a Best Actor award from the DVD Exclusive Awards, formerly known as the Video Premiere Awards. Gross said he took the Tremors role partly because he enjoyed the prospect of playing the paranoid survivalist character who was very different from the pacifist hippie Steven Keaton.

Gross guest-starred in an episode of the sitcom Night Court, in which he played a man who sexually assaults Markie Post's character, Christine Sullivan. In 1988, he portrayed a murderous bank robber in the true life film In the Line of Duty: The F.B.I. Murders. His other television credits include Boston Legal, How I Met Your Mother, Batman Beyond, ER, Parks and Recreation (Episode: "Summer Catalog"), Law & Order and two of its spin-offs: SVU and Criminal Intent. From August 2008 to January 2009, Gross appeared on the CBS soap The Young and the Restless as River Baldwin. Gross appeared in 2000 on Spin City as a therapist to Michael J. Fox's character on Fox's final show as a regular on that program. In November 1979, Gross originated the role of Greta in the Broadway production of Martin Sherman's Bent.

== Personal life ==
Gross has been married to casting director Elza Bergeron since June 2, 1984, and he is the stepfather to her two children.

Gross remains close friends with his Family Ties co-star Meredith Baxter.

Gross is a railfan with an extensive collection of railroad antiques. He is an amateur railroad historian, photographer, modeler, and former part-owner in a working railroad, the Santa Fe Southern Railway, a former branch line of the Atchison, Topeka and Santa Fe Railway which operates between Lamy and Santa Fe, New Mexico. He is also the spokesman for the World's Greatest Hobby campaign sponsored by the Model Railroad Industry Association that promotes the hobby of model railroading. He has also been a spokesperson for Operation Lifesaver, a campaign promoting safety at railroad grade crossings.

Since 2009, Gross has been the "celebrity spokesman" for the B&O Railroad Museum (now known as the National Museum of Railroad History & Innovation) in Baltimore, Maryland. He is also the host of the B&O Railroad Museum Television Network on YouTube and a member of the Santa Fe Railway Historical Society.

Gross is a fan of the Chicago Cubs baseball team. After the Cubs won the 2016 World Series, Gross suggested his character Burt Gummer switch to a Cubs cap for Tremors: A Cold Day in Hell, replacing the Atlanta Hawks cap he had worn in the first five films of the series.

== Filmography ==
=== Film ===
Year	Title	Role	Notes
1980	Just Tell Me What You Want	Lothar	
1987	Dorothy Meets Ozma of Oz	Himself / Host	Voice, direct to video
1988	Big Business	Dr. Jay Marshall	
1990	Tremors	Burt Gummer	
1991	Cool as Ice	Gordon Winslow / James Anthony Hackett	
1992	Alan & Naomi	Sol Silverman	
1994	In the Heat of Passion II: Unfaithful	Howard	
1996	Tremors 2: Aftershocks	Burt Gummer	Direct to video
1996	Sometimes They Come Back... Again	Jon Porter	Direct to video
1996	Kounterfeit	Captain Evans	Direct to video
1997	True Heart	Dick	
1998	Ground Control	Murray	
2001	Tremors 3: Back to Perfection	Burt Gummer	Direct to video
2003	Super Chief: Speed-Style-Service	Narrator	Documentary
2004	Tremors 4: The Legend Begins	Hiram Gummer	Tremors 4 or Tremors: The Legend Begins; Direct to video
2004	You're on the Set of "Tremors 4: The Legend Begins"	Himself	Documentary short
2004	Daylight: The Most Beautiful Train In The World	Host / Narrator	Documentary
2006	Frühlingsgefühle		Short film
2007	The Ballad of Esequiel Hernández	Himself	Documentary
2008	El Sonoma	Mr. Goreman	
2008	An American in China	Manny Braddock	
2008	100 Million BC	Dr. Frank Reno	Direct to video
2008	Broken Windows	Teddy	
2009	Stay Cool	Mr. McCarthy	
2011	You're a Wolf	Dad	Short film
2011	Pizza Man	Professor Tucker	
2011	Just Like Her	Paul Marston	Short film
2012	Tim and Eric's Billion Dollar Movie	Narrator	
2012	Atlas Shrugged: Part II	Ted "Buzz" Killman	
2012	Meant to Be	Mr. Trantham	
2013	Guest House	Lou Wesley	Short film
2014	Our Father	John	Short film
2015	Tremors 5: Bloodlines	Burt Gummer	Direct to video
2015	Christmas at Rosemont	Dr. Molina	
2015	Bilal: A New Breed of Hero	Okba	Voice
2015	He Said	Walter Elling	
2016	Quackerz	Duckmus	Voice
2016	Last Call at Murray's	Murray	
2016	C Street	Governor Appalachia	
2016	20th Century Limited: America's Most Famous Passenger Train	Narrator	Documentary
2016	Model Citizens	Himself	Documentary
2017	Camp Cool Kids	Grandpa Norman	
2018	Tremors Franchise Recap	Burt Gummer	Short film
2018	Tremors: A Cold Day in Hell	Burt Gummer	Also known as Tremors 6: A Cold Day in Hell; Direct-to-video
2018	Power of the Air	Chairman	
2019	Noelle	Elder Elf Abe	Cameo
2020	Tremors: Making Perfection	Himself	Documentary short
2020	A Ring for Christmas	Graham Moore	
2020	Tremors: Shrieker Island	Burt Gummer	Also known as Tremors 7 and Tremors: Island Fury; Direct to video
2024	Chosen Family	Alfred	
2024	The Merry Gentlemen	Stan	Netflix original film

=== Television ===
Year	Title	Role	Notes
1975	A Girl Named Sooner	Jim Seevey	Television film
1980	F.D.R.: The Last Year	Dr. Howard Bruenn	Television film
1981	Dream House	Julius "J.J." Jacobson	Television film
1982	The Neighborhood	Jack Wolfe	Television film
1982	Little Gloria... Happy at Last	Gilchrist	Miniseries
1982–1989	Family Ties	Steven Keaton	Main role, 171 episodes
1983	Cook & Peary: The Race to the Pole	James Troth	Television film
1984	Summer Fantasy	Ben Brannigan	Television film
1985	Finder of Lost Loves	Tom Lindsay	Episode: "Last Wish"
1985	Family Ties Vacation	Steven Keaton	Television film
1985	A Letter to Three Wives	George Phipps	Television film
1987	Night Court	Arthur Thursby	Episode: "Caught Red Handed"
1987	Right to Die	Bob Bauer	Television film
1988	In the Line of Duty: The F.B.I. Murders	William Russell Matix	Television film
1988	Day by Day	Steven Keaton	Episode: "Trading Places"
1989	A Connecticut Yankee in King Arthur's Court	King Arthur	Television film
1990	Vestige of Honor	Don Scott	Television film
1991	In the Line of Duty: Manhunt in the Dakotas	Agent Richard Mayberly	Television film
1992	With a Vengeance	Frank Tanner	Television film
1993	Batman: The Animated Series	Lloyd Ventrix / Mojo	Voice, episode: "See No Evil"
1994	Snowbound: The Jim and Jennifer Stolpa Story	Kevin Mulligan	Television film
1994	In the Line of Duty: The Price of Vengeance	Tom Williams	Television film
1994	Dream On	Father Sherman McKigney	Episode: "The Second Coming"
1994	Avalanche	Brian Kemp	Television film
1995	Awake to Danger	Ben McAdams	Television film
1995	Deceived by Trust	Dr. Gordon Powell	Television film
1996	Hijacked: Flight 285	Ben Horn	Television film
1996	Ed McBain's 87th Precinct: Ice	Lt. Peter Byrnes	Television film
1996	The Making of a Hollywood Madam	Paul Fleiss	
1996	The Outer Limits	Professor Stanley Hurst	Episode: "Inconstant Moon"
1996	The Outer Limits Phenomenon	Himself	TV documentary
1996	Promised Land	Greg Smith	Episode: "The Expatriate"
1997	Ed McBain's 87th Precinct: Heatwave	Lt. Peter Byrnes	Television film
1997	The Hunger	Professor Frank Ingram	Episode: "But at My Back I Always Hear"
1999	Batman Beyond	Warren McGinnis	Voice, episode: "Rebirth: Part 1"
1999	Ally McBeal	Mr. Volpe	Episode: "Only the Lonely"
1999	Norm	Councilman Krantz	2 episodes
2000	Law & Order	Carl Braddock	Episode: "Trade This"
2000	Spin City	Dr. Peterson	Episode: "Goodbye: Part 1"
2000	Family Law	Anthony Jacobs	Episode: "Affairs of the State"
2001	The Undesirable		Television film
2001–2004	ER	John Carter Sr.	6 episodes
2002	Law & Order: Criminal Intent	Dr. Charles Webb	Episode: "Crazy"
2002	Law & Order: Special Victims Unit	Arthur Esterman	Episode: "Lust"
2003	Tremors	Burt Gummer	Main role; 13 episodes
2004	Combustion	Talbot	Television film
2004	The Drew Carey Show	Don Newmark	4 episodes
2004–2005	Nature	Narrator	2 episodes
2005	Mrs. Harris	Leslie Jacobson	Television film
2005	CSI: NY	Tom Endecott	Episode: "Manhattan Manhunt"
2006	Dome Car Magic: A History of Railroad Dome Cars	Narrator	
2006–2011	How I Met Your Mother	Alfred Mosby	3 episodes
2007	Boston Legal	Father Nicholas McClinton	Episode: "Duck and Cover"
2008–2009	The Young and the Restless	River Baldwin	36 episodes
2010	Parks and Recreation	Michael Tansley	Episode: "Summer Catalog"
2010	Tim and Eric Awesome Show, Great Job!	Robin	Episode: "Crows"
2010	Psych	Cody Blair	Episode: "Dead Bear Walking"
2011	Brothers & Sisters	Edward LeMonde	Episode: "The One That Got Away"
2011	Family Guy	Steven Keaton	Episode: "Brothers & Sisters"
2011	Drop Dead Diva	Principal Blake	Episode: "Prom"
2011	Curb Your Enthusiasm	Dermatologist Dr. Rivkin	Episode: "The Smiley Face"
2011	12 Wishes of Christmas	Harry	Television film
2011	On Set: The Making of "12 Wishes of Christmas"	Himself	Short documentary
2011–2013	Dan Vs.	Don	Voice, 5 episodes
2012	Blue-Eyed Butcher	Ron Wright	Television film
2012	Adopting Terror	Dr. Ziegler	Television film
2012	NTSF:SD:SUV::	Huck Jingles	Episode: "Family Dies"
2012	CSI: Crime Scene Investigation	President Rob Austin	Episode: "Pick and Roll"
2012	Naughty or Nice	Walter Kringle	Television film
2012	The Dog Who Saved the Holidays	Ned	Television film
2013	Call Me Fitz	Pat Childs	5 episodes
2014	Last Man Standing	Mr. Hardin	Episode: "Hard-Ass Teacher"
2014	Suits	Walter Gillis	4 episodes
2014	Partners	J.P. Buchanan	Episode: "The Law School Reunion"
2014	Anger Management	Dr. Randy Warren	4 episodes
2015	Carbon Dating	Chris	Main role; 6 episodes
2015	Becoming Santa	Nick Claus	Television film
2015–2016	Grace and Frankie	Jeff	4 episodes
2015–2017	The Stanley Dynamic	Grandpa / Lawrence Sr.	5 episodes
2016	Togetherness	Mr. Pierson	Episode: "Advanced Pretend"
2016	Law & Order: Special Victims Unit	Jeffrey Prince	Episode: "Assaulting Reality"
2018	A.P. Bio	Brandon	Episode: "Rosemary's Boyfriend"
2018	The Affair	Dr. Ezra Kaplan	2 episodes
2018	Christmas Pen Pals	Ted	Television film
2019	Sister of the Bride	Robert	Television film
2019	Christmas Reservations	Tom Anderson	Television film
