= 94 Meetings =

- Parks and Recreation episode
- Episode no.: Season 2 Episode 21
- Directed by: Tristram Shapeero
- Written by: Harris Wittels
- Original air date: April 29, 2010

Guest appearances
- Alison Becker as Shauna Malwae-Tweep; John Ellison Conlee as Larry Ludgate; Terri Hoyos as Rita Ludgate; Yvans Jourdain as Councilman Douglass Howser; Minni Jo Mazzola as Natalie Ludgate; Christopher Murray as Nick Newport Sr.; Jim O'Heir as Jerry Gergich; Susan Yeagley as Jessica Wicks

Episode chronology
← Previous "Summer Catalog"	Next → "Telethon"
- Parks and Recreation season 2

"94 Meetings" is the 21st episode of the second season of the American comedy television series Parks and Recreation, and the 27th overall episode of the series. It originally aired on NBC in the United States on April 29, 2010. In the episode, Ron is forced to handle 94 meetings in a single day due to an error by his assistant, April. Meanwhile, Leslie tries to stop alterations to a historic mansion while dealing with her hidden insecurities about the escalation of Ann and Mark's romantic relationship.

The episode was written by Harris Wittels and directed by Tristram Shapeero. It featured guest appearances by several actors who had appeared in previous episodes, including Susan Yeagley, Alison Becker and Yvans Jourdain. It also introduced April Ludgate's family. According to Nielsen Media Research, "94 Meetings" was seen by 4.03 million household viewers, and received particularly high ratings among males between ages 18 and 34. The episode received generally positive reviews.

== Plot ==
Due to a mistake by April, Ron is forced to deal with 93 meetings in a single day because April scheduled them all for March 31, mistakenly believing it is not a real date. He enlists the aid of April, Andy, Leslie and Ann to help handle them, while telling Jerry that he is free to go home early. During her first meeting, Leslie learns a historic town monument, the Turnbill Mansion, is soon to be altered by its new renter, the former Miss Pawnee beauty pageant winner Jessica Wicks. Leslie and Tom leave to meet with her at the mansion, where Jessica is planning a birthday party for her extremely old husband, the wealthy Nick Newport Sr., founder of the Sweetums candy company. Leslie is shocked Jessica has already made several alterations, such as hanging up nude portraits of herself and painting the floor.

Leslie is outraged when Jessica reveals her plans to demolish an old gazebo in the backyard of Turnbill Mansion, the site of a historic wedding between a Pawnee Native American and a white woman, which became a "bloodbath" when knowledge of the wedding became public. Under Leslie's orders, Tom chains Leslie to the front gate to prevent construction crews from entering. However, she mistakenly assumes the gate opens from the middle when it actually opens from the side, which enables the crews to enter right past Leslie and demolish the gazebo. At the end of the day, Ann and Mark arrive to free her, and Leslie finally reveals to Tom the true source of her anxiety—Mark's intentions to marry Ann. Leslie feels emotional confusion over this fact. On the one hand, she wants her friends to be happy. On the other hand, she used to have romantic feelings for Mark, she feels insecure about being single, and she worries about losing her two friends. In response, Tom assures her not to worry, thus empowering Leslie to crash and ruin Jessica's party.

Meanwhile, Ron and the others deal with their meetings: April acts as uninterested as possible, Andy makes promises to people against Ron's wishes, and Ann provides several medical consults after revealing she is really a nurse (not a parks and recreation department employee). Although the two had previously been developing a romantic interest, Andy now acts uninterested in April because he feels uncomfortable about the eight-year age difference between them, further upsetting April on a difficult day. Ron, who views the many meetings as an utter nightmare, calls in the others during the middle of the day for a progress report, and angrily berates April for her mistake. After all the meetings, April arranges her own meeting with Ron, the 94th & final meeting of the day, where she announces she is quitting. When Andy learns this, he convinces Ron that April is a great assistant. Ron goes to April's house and convinces her to come back by telling her about Andy's compliments. April then reveals that she knows Ron is Duke Silver, since her mother is a huge fan, and that she recognized him the first time that they met. On her first day back, April successfully scares off someone wanting to meet with Ron by scheduling absurd meeting dates and times such as June 50th, the "one-teenth" of "March-tember" and 2:65 PM. Ron gives her an approving smile and nod while watching from his office.

== Production ==
"94 Meetings" was written by Harris Wittels and directed by Tristram Shapeero. Ron Swanson and his staff handle only 93 meetings in the episode, but the 94th meeting from the episode title refers to April's hastily arranged meeting with Ron in which she quits the job. "94 Meetings" was the first episode to introduce April Ludgate's family, who Ron meets when he goes to April's house to convince her to return to work. The family includes April's extremely chipper mother and father Larry and Rita Ludgate (John Ellison and Terri Hoyos), and April's younger sister Natalie Ludgate (Minni Jo Mazzola), who is cynical and brooding very much like April herself. Susan Yeagley, who previously appeared in "Beauty Pageant", guest starred in "94 Meetings" as Jessica Wicks, and Alison Becker reprised her role as reporter Shauna Malwae-Tweep, who was first introduced in "The Reporter". The episode also featured Yvans Jourdain in his recurring role as Pawnee Councilman Howser.

"94 Meetings" included several references to past Parks and Recreation episodes. The Newport family and their powerful "Sweetums" corporation were first featured in the episode "Sweetums", where they convinced the public to allow their extremely unhealthy nutrition bars to be sold at a local park. In another scene, April refers to Ron as "Duke Silver", his secret jazz saxophonist alter ego first revealed in the episode "Practice Date". It also features several running gags from throughout the series, including angrily complaining Pawnee citizens, Ann helping parks employees despite not working there, and extremely gory and racist historical Pawnee murals.

Within a week of the episode's original broadcast, a copy of a desk calendar chronicling all of Ron Swanson's meetings from the episode was placed on the official Parks and Recreation website. That site also featured three deleted scenes from the episode. In the first, 80-second clip, Leslie and Jessica get into a fight about the gazebo, and Jessica reveals she has trimmed the mansion's historic hedges into the shape of elephants. The second clip, which lasted one minute, features several more of Ron Swanson's meetings, including one where he tries to literally will a man away with his mind. Andy also tells Ron he accidentally agreed to sell the recreation center to the Quiznos fast food restaurant chain. In the third, 90-second clip, Leslie tries to end Nick Newport Sr.'s birthday party by pulling the plug on the lights, but accidentally disconnects his breathing machine instead.

== Reception ==
In its original American broadcast, "94 Meetings" was seen by an estimated 4.03 million household viewers, according to Nielsen Media Research. It received a 2.0 rating/6 share among viewers between ages 18 and 49, which tied the ratings of the last original episode, "Summer Catalog", although that episode was seen by around 110,000 more viewers. "94 Meetings" received particularly high ratings among males between ages 18 and 34, a demographic particularly sought after by the networks. The episode received a 2.2 rating in that group, besting the CBS reality series Survivor's 2.0 rating.

The best episodes of Parks And Recreation balance giving due time to the show's premise and shedding light on the relationship between the characters; that's the reason that it's not a genre-defying game-changer, but just a solid, reliable, and especially effective situation comedy.

— Leonard Pierce
The A.V. Club

Alan Sepinwall, television columnist for The Star-Ledger, said the meetings themselves were very entertaining and allowed for good character development between April and Andy, and Ron and April. However, he said the main plot with Leslie and the historic mansion was not tied strongly enough to Leslie's fear that Mark and Ann would get married. Matt Fowler of IGN praised the episode, especially the callbacks to previous episodes and the interaction of the characters during the meetings. Although the show was only on hiatus for about a month, he said, "Man, it feels so good to have Parks and Recreation back. [...] I don't think there's another comedy on TV right now that contains such 'miss-able' characters."

The A.V. Club writer Leonard Pierce said "94 Meetings" was a particularly strong episode that focused equally on the show's premise and developing the relationships between characters. He particularly praised Susan Yeagley, but said Tom Haverford was underused, and felt the scenes between Ann and Mark were lacking. New York magazine writer Steve Kandell said it was a fast-paced and funny episode, calling the jokes about the complaining residents "rapid-fire scenes". Kandell criticized Mark, who he said has been resorted to boring "straight-man services", and said he did not mind that Paul Schneider was leaving the series. Kona Gallagher of TV Squad appreciated that the episode reintroduced the fact that Leslie once was in love with Mark, and criticized the show for ignoring that fact all season. Gallagher also criticized the fact that a historic building could so easily be damaged and demolished, which she called unrealistic.

== DVD release ==
"94 Meetings", along with the other 23 second-season episodes of Parks and Recreation, was released on a four-disc DVD set in the United States on November 30, 2010. The DVD included deleted scenes for each episode.
