= Telethon (Parks and Recreation) =

- Parks and Recreation episode
- Episode no.: Season 2 Episode 22
- Directed by: Troy Miller
- Written by: Amy Poehler
- Original air date: May 6, 2010

Guest appearances
- Andrew Burlinson as Wyatt "Burly" Burlinson; John Balma as Barney; Mo Collins as Joan Callamezzo; Kirk Fox as Joe Fantringham; Jay Jackson as Perd Hapley; Jim Meskimen as Martin; Andy Milder as Freddy; Jim O'Heir as Jerry Gergich; Retta as Donna Meagle; Mark Rivers as Drummer; Detlef Schrempf as himself; Alan Yang as Bassist

Episode chronology
← Previous "94 Meetings"	Next → "The Master Plan"
- Parks and Recreation season 2

"Telethon" is the 22nd episode of the second season of the American comedy television series Parks and Recreation, and the 28th overall episode of the series. It originally aired on NBC in the United States on May 6, 2010. In the episode, Leslie volunteers to host a charity telethon and is given the unappealing 2 a.m. to 6 a.m. shift.

The episode was directed by Troy Miller and written by Amy Poehler, who stars as the protagonist Leslie Knope, her first script for the series. "Telethon" featured a guest appearance by retired basketball player Detlef Schrempf, as well as several actors who had previously appeared in Parks and Recreation, including Mo Collins and Jay Jackson.

The episode received generally positive reviews and, according to Nielsen Media Research, was seen by 4.03 million household viewers, roughly the same as the previous week's episode, "94 Meetings".

== Plot ==
Leslie has volunteered to work on the 24-hour "Pawnee Cares" diabetes telethon and orders everyone in the office to work the phones for multiple shifts. Tom is assigned to pick up retired basketball player Detlef Schrempf from the airport, the special guest for the telethon. Leslie is excited because she has been allowed to program her own four-hour block, but her co-workers are upset to learn it runs from 2 a.m. to 6 a.m. Additionally, she has already been up for 24 hours creating T-shirts for her staff to wear for the telethon.

During lunch, Mark tells Leslie that he is going to propose to Ann. Ann suggests that Leslie get some sleep, but she plans on consuming Sweetums bars to stay awake for another 24 hours. As the telethon begins, Leslie is already exhausted and is falling asleep. With time to kill, Tom brings Detlef to the Snakehole Lounge, but the owner, Freddy, refuses to let him go because Detlef is bringing a lot of business, delaying Leslie's big headliner. Andy's band, Mouse Rat, is asked to replace Detlef, but when they complete all of their songs, Leslie has nothing else to put on the air. Ron volunteers to demonstrate how to cane a chair, but his presentation is so boring that the telethon actually starts to lose money.

Desperate for something to put on, Leslie tells Mark that he should propose to Ann in front of the camera and he agrees. Not long after, however, Ann confides in Leslie that she wants to break up with Mark, citing that he is simply not the one. Meanwhile, April tries to make Andy jealous by flirting with someone over the phone, but it backfires when it turns out to be Joe from the Pawnee sewer department. Andy is forced to kick Joe out of the studio when he actually arrives to bring April to his van.

The telethon's talent pool becomes so low that Leslie resorts to repeatedly flipping a coin on camera and tallying the number of heads and tails, as well as talking about her favorite episodes of Friends. Jerry is allowed to play the piano, but everyone dismisses his skilled playing as a racket. Mark finally returns to propose and walks on the set with the ring, but Leslie stops him by pulling her pants down in front of the camera. Detlef Schrempf and Tom arrive at the end of Leslie's programming block, and Detlef presents a check for $5,000, allowing the telethon to bypass its $20,000 mark. Despite being awake for two days straight, Leslie goes to Ann's house to talk about Mark. She then promptly falls asleep on Ann's couch for 22 hours.

== Production ==
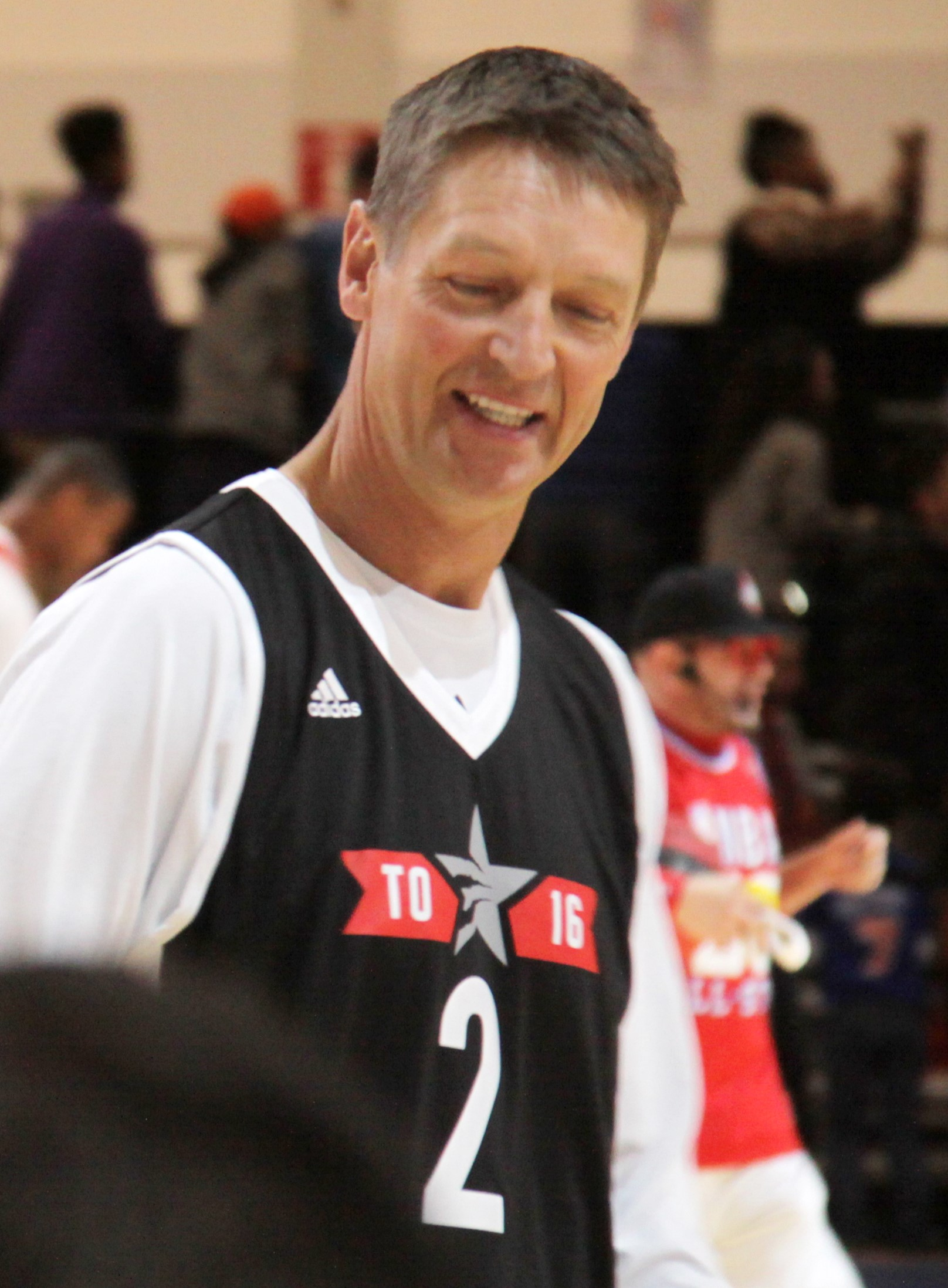
Retired basketball pro Detlef Schrempf (pictured in 2016) made a guest appearance in "Telethon".

"Telethon" was directed by Troy Miller and written by Amy Poehler, who stars as the Parks and Recreation protagonist Leslie Knope. It was the first episode she had written for the show. Early in the series, Poehler had expressed to Parks co-creator Michael Schur that she wanted to write an episode, but they agreed she would wait for a filming hiatus before doing so. Poehler said the scenes in which Leslie uses sugar rushes to re-energize herself at night, only to crash later, was reminiscent of some of her own all-night experiences working on the sketch comedy series Saturday Night Live.

"Telethon" featured a guest appearance by Detlef Schrempf, a retired basketball player who played for the Indiana Pacers; Parks and Recreation is set in Indiana. Prior to filming the episode, Schrempf's acting skills had been limited to appearances on the American comedy series Married... with Children and the German soap opera Gute Zeiten, schlechte Zeiten. Schur said of his performance, "For a guy who literally never acted before in his life, he was really funny." Aziz Ansari joked about the performance, "We're going to write a spin-off for him called That's So Detlef, so look forward to that." "Telethon" also featured guest appearances by several actors who had appeared in previous episodes, including Mo Collins as Pawnee Today television host Joan Callamezzo and Jay Jackson as Pawnee television news reporter Perd Hapley. John Balma also made a guest appearance as Barney, a local teacher who gave the audience an extremely boring accounting presentation, just as he did in "Leslie's House".

In addition to the performances, "Telethon" included several references to previous episodes. During the telethon, Andy and his band perform a song called "Sex Hair". This is a reference to "Galentine's Day", in which he claims to have written a song about how one can tell whether someone had sex because their hair is matted. A music video for the song was made available on the official NBC.com Parks and Recreation website shortly after the episode was broadcast. Also in "Telethon," the television event is sponsored by the candy manufacturer Sweetums, and Leslie constantly eats their Nutri-Yum bars in order to stay awake. Both the company and candy bars were prominently featured by "Sweetums", where Leslie and Ann fought to prevent the unhealthy snacks from being sold in Pawnee parks. In other scenes, Tom takes Detlef Schrempf to the Snakehole Lounge, a nightclub where Tom previously purchased shares in the episode "Woman of the Year".

On July 8, 2010, Amy Poehler was nominated for the Primetime Emmy Award for Outstanding Lead Actress in a Comedy Series for her overall work in the second season, and her performance in "Telethon" was the episode submitted for consideration. The award ultimately went to Edie Falco for her performance in the Showtime comedy series Nurse Jackie.

== Cultural references ==
Tom describes his clothing as "Brooks Brothers Boys", the children-size line from the men's clothier chain Brooks Brothers. While intoxicated, Tom starts to sing music by rapper Soulja Boy Tell 'Em. In order to stall for time during the telethon, Leslie starts talking about her favorite episodes of Friends, a sitcom that previously aired on NBC. She specifically refers to the fourth season episode "The One with Chandler in a Box", in which Monica Geller prepares a Thanksgiving dinner, and Chandler Bing agrees to spend the holiday in a box as punishment for kissing Joey Tribbiani's girlfriend. Donna mentions that her brother is in Liberia; in real life, Retta's aunt is the president of Liberia.

== Reception ==
In its original American broadcast, "Telethon" was seen by an estimated 4.03 million household viewers, according to Nielsen Media Research. It received a 2.8 rating/5 share among overall viewers, and a 2.0 rating/7 share among viewers between ages 18 and 49. This rating was about even from the previous episode, "94 Meetings". "Telethon" was outperformed in the 8:30 p.m. timeslot by the CBS reality series Survivor: Heroes vs. Villains and the Fox crime drama Bones, but Parks and Recreation outperformed the CW Network supernatural fantasy series The Vampire Diaries and the ABC science-fiction drama FlashForward.

"Telethon," the episode written by series-star Amy Poehler, had more of the same - but I mean that in an extraordinarily good way! Ron was grumpy, Tom was shallow, Leslie was hyper, April was sullen and Jerry was, well, Jerry. But I loved every minute of it.

— Matt Fowler, IGN

"Telethon" received generally positive reviews. Matt Fowler of IGN praised the many inside jokes and character quirks featured in the episode. He said although The Office (another comedy series by Parks and Recreation co-creator Greg Daniels) is limited mainly to one setting, "Telethon" demonstrates how the Parks characters can be placed into a myriad of settings and situations. Entertainment Weekly writer Margaret Lyons said, "If that wasn’t the best episode of Parks and Recreation yet, it’s at least top five." Lyons said every character and subplot was in strong form except for Ann and Mark, which she said has consistently been the show's "Achilles' heel", and that this episode demonstrated how poorly it fit with the other elements of the series. Steve Heisler of The A.V. Club called the episode "one of the greats", claiming it served as a spotlight of the strong characters and subplot developed throughout the second season. Heisler also said the episode contained some of the season's strongest one-liners. New York magazine writer Steve Kandell said although "Telethon" advanced the eventual break-up of Mark and Ann, the episode basically served as an excuse "to showcase Amy Poehler in varying stages of exhaustion-related delirium".

== DVD release ==
"Telethon", along with the other 23 second season episodes of Parks and Recreation, was released on a four-disc DVD set in the United States on November 30, 2010. The DVD included deleted scenes for each episode.
