= Tremors: A Cold Day in Hell =

2018 film by Don Michael Paul

- Promotional release poster
- Directed by: Don Michael Paul
- Written by: John Whelpley
- Produced by: Mike Elliott
- Starring: Jamie Kennedy; Tanya van Graan; Jamie-Lee Money; Kiroshan Naidoo; Keeno Lee Hector; Rob van Vuuren; Adrienne Pearce; Michael Gross
- Cinematography: Hein de Vos
- Edited by: Cameron Hallenbeck
- Music by: Frederik Wiedmann
- Production company: Universal 1440 Entertainment
- Distributed by: Universal Pictures Home Entertainment
- Release date: May 1, 2018
- Running time: 94 minutes
- Country: United States
- Language: English

Tremors: A Cold Day in Hell is a 2018 direct-to-video horror sci-fi film directed by Don Michael Paul. It is the sixth film in the Tremors series of monster films. The film was released on DVD and Blu-ray, as well as on Netflix on May 1, 2018.

== Plot ==
In Canada's Nunavut Territory, a team of young researchers collecting ice core samples of glaciers are killed by a Graboid. After brushing off a tax agent, Burt Gummer and his son Travis Welker are asked by Dr. Rita Sims and young Graboid hunter Valerie McKee to investigate. Their plane is attacked by an Ass-Blaster, but Burt and Travis make it to the facility. They learn that Arctic heat conditions have made the area prime for Graboids. Burt suspects their research neighbors at DARPA are developing bioweapons from the Graboids. When an Ass-Blaster attacks the facility, Burt rescues a researcher but experiences an episode and collapses. He learns that he has been infected by a parasite based on Graboid venom, from when he was inside one years earlier, and that they need to extract the antibodies from a live one to save him.

As Graboids continue to kill off researchers and staff, several members of the group try to make their way from the lab to the generator area where the pilot Mac is repairing the plane, and the facilities manager Swackhamer has created a makeshift underground electric fence. Others head for the communications tower to turn off a drill that has automatically activated. With his own research team attacked, Agent Cutts of DARPA joins Burt's group, revealing that his team was more interested in extracting the melted water and not fashioning bio-weapons. He agrees to Burt and Travis' conditions that the government remove the tax liens from their place in Perfection and exempt them from paying property taxes henceforth. The group eventually uses a storage container to trap one of the Graboids, spearing it from the side to hold it in place, and cutting off its front tentacles. Travis reaches into the graboid's mouth with a syringe and draws venom from its internal gland sac, which is then used to save Burt. Cutts gives the Gummers the paperwork, freeing them from taxes, then they blow up the last Graboid before Cutts gets any ideas of really using it as a bio-weapon.

== Cast ==
- Michael Gross as Burt Gummer, the only resident left in the apparently abandoned and demolished Perfection, Nevada
- Jamie Kennedy as Travis B. Welker, Burt's son who works as a filmmaker
- Tanya van Graan as Dr. Rita Sims, the lead researcher at Boite Canyon Arctic Research Facility
- Jamie-Lee Money as Valerie McKee, a Graboid expert, student intern at the facility, and the daughter of Val McKee and Rhonda LeBeck
- Kiroshan Naidoo as Hart Hansen, a researcher in geomorphology
- Keeno Lee Hector as Aklark, Valerie and Rita's assistant
- Rob van Vuuren as Swackhamer, facility manager
- Adrienne Pearce as Mac, the pilot

== Production ==
On September 20, 2016, Michael Gross announced on his official Facebook page that the film was in development. Filming commenced in late January 2017.

The crew had originally intended to shoot in the mountains of Bulgaria, but after the country had endured one of its largest blizzards, they opted to return to South Africa, where Tremors 5: Bloodlines was filmed. The weather was explained by climate change causing unusual warmth in the Arctic. The crew used CGI for many of the Graboid scenes.

== Reception ==
Tremors: A Cold Day in Hell received mixed reviews. The review aggregator website Rotten Tomatoes reported an approval rating of 40%, with an average rating of 5.5/10, based on 5 reviews. Tim Janson of The SciFi Movie Page gave the film two stars out of five, saying "While none of the Tremors sequels (nor the one prequel) have ever been able to hold a candle to the original, A Cold Day in Hell is definitely one to miss. This sleep-inducing bore fest cannot even be saved by Burt’s over-the-top arrogance and crankiness." Gavin Al-Asif for the Houston Chronicle called the film "so bad it's nearly unwatchable" and said the film felt as if it were "made by people who absolutely loathe Tremors and want to insult the fans as much as possible". Conversely, Fred Topel of Bloody Disgusting gave the film a more positive review of 3.5 out of 5, noting that that arctic setting was "... a fun change of setting without compromising the monster attacks." He also praised the performances of the cast, especially Gross and Money.

It earned $1,530,564 from domestic home video sales.

== Sequel ==
A sequel, Tremors: Shrieker Island, was released on October 20, 2020, with Michael Gross reprising his role as Burt.
