= Ogden Gavanski =

- Occupation: Film Producer

Ogden Gavanski is a film producer from Canada who has worked on local and American productions. He has worked with well-known Hollywood actors and also co-produced with Pedro Almodovar.

== Career ==
Gavanski has produced various films including Tremors 5: Bloodlines, Cult of Chucky, Liberty Stands Still, The Man with the Iron Fists 2, Man About Town (2006 film) and The Scorpion King 4: Quest for Power. He's worked with Hollywood actors such as Ben Affleck, Rebecca Romijn, John Cleese, Lou Ferrigno, Rutger Hauer, Wesley Snipes, and Linda Fiorentino.

Gavanski also co-produced My Life Without Me with Pedro Almodovar in 2003. Starring Sarah Polley and Mark Ruffalo, the film won the "German Art House Cinemas" award at the Berlin Film Festival and garnered a nomination for best film at the European Film Awards. The film also won a best feature Leo Award, which celebrates excellence in British Columbia's film and television industry.

Gavanski is one of the owners of Milestone Production, a Vancouver production company founded in 1996. The company has worked with Vancouver-based Trimark Holdings, which was purchased by Lions Gate Entertainment in 2000. Gavanski is a member of the Directors Guild of Canada.

== Filmography ==
- 2019 Inside Man: Most Wanted
- 2019 Doom: Annihilation
- 2017 Dead Again in Tombstone
- 2017 Cult of Chucky
- 2015 Tremors 5: Bloodlines
- 2015 The Man with the Iron Fists 2
- 2015 The Scorpion King 4: Quest for Power
- 2013 Warm Bodies (film)
- 2011 Immortals (2011 film)
- 2008 Punisher: War Zone
- 2008 Thomas Kinkade's Christmas Cottage
- 2008 The Eye
- 2007 Why Did I Get Married?
- 2007 Good Luck Chuck
- 2006 Black Christmas (2006 film)
- 2006 Man About Town (2006 film)
- 2005 Fierce People
- 2003 My Life Without Me
- 2002 Liberty Stands Still
- 2001 Turbulence 3: Heavy Metal
- 1999-2000 Nothing Too Good for a Cowboy (TV Series)

== Background and education ==
Of Serbian descent, Gavanski immigrated to Canada from Bosnia-Herzegovina when he was a child. He holds a bachelor's degree in political science and two master's degrees, one in film production and the other in political science.
