= Finn Carter =

American actress (born 1960)

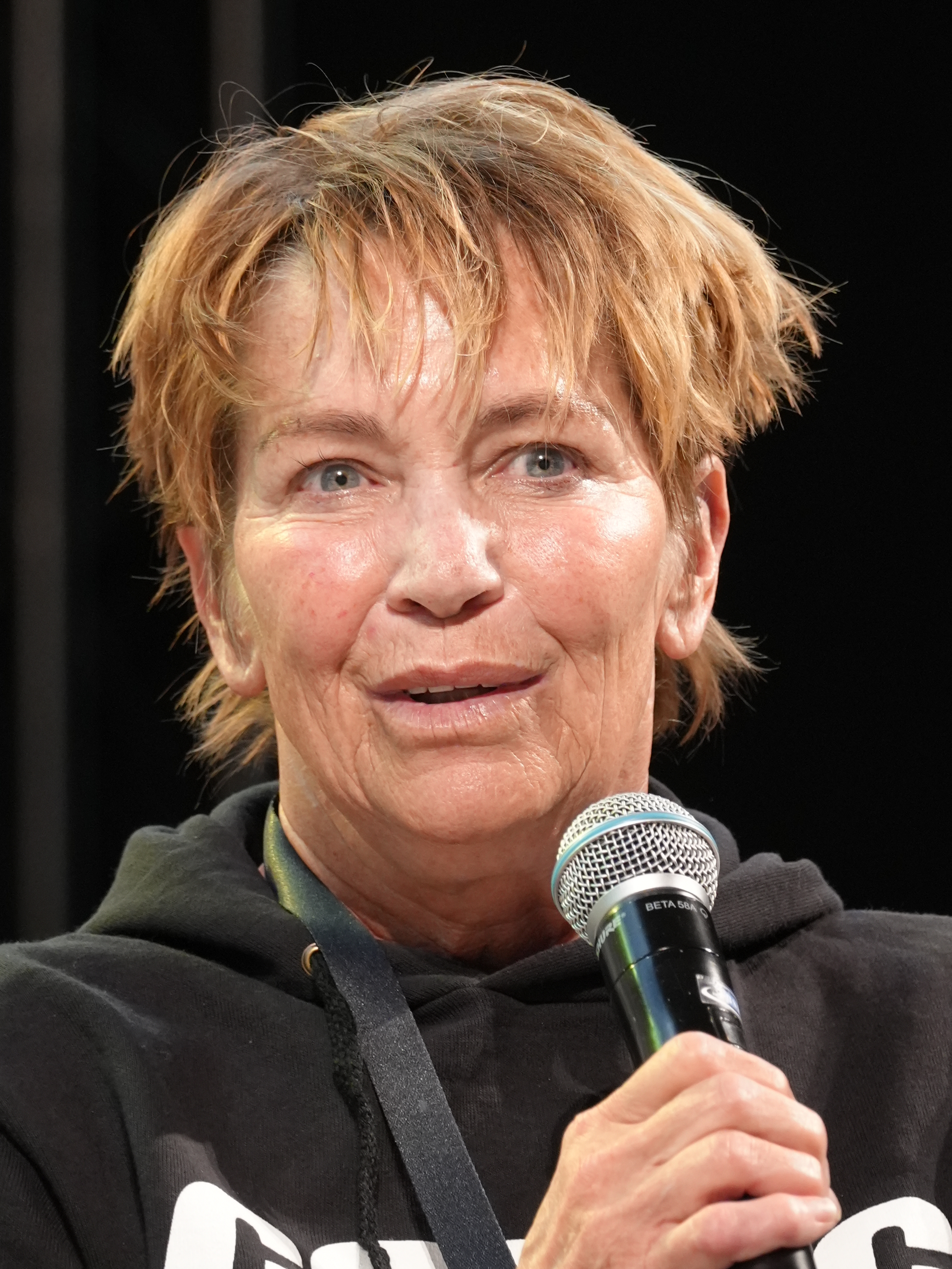
- Carter in 2026
- Born: Elizabeth Fearn Carter; March 9, 1960 (age 66); Greenville, Mississippi, U.S
- Education: Skidmore College; Tulane University
- Occupation: Actress
- Years active: 1985–2005, 2024-present
- Spouses: Steven Weber (m. 1985; div. 1994); J.B. Woodruff (m. 1997; div. 2007)
- Children: 2
- Father: Hodding Carter III

Elizabeth Fearn "Finn" Carter (born March 9, 1960) is an American former actress. She is best known for her role in the 1990 film Tremors.

== Early life ==
Carter was born in Greenville, Mississippi in 1960. She is the daughter of Hodding Carter III, a journalist and former U.S. Assistant Secretary of State and his first wife, Margaret Ainsworth Wolfe.

== Career ==
Carter began her career in the theatre and was a member of the Circle Repertory Company in New York. She created the role of Effie Herrington at San Diego's Old Globe Theatre in Up In Saratoga, written by Terrence McNally and directed by Jack O'Brien. Her second West Coast theatre appearance was at the Pasadena Playhouse in a revival of Biloxi Blues. At the same time, she began acting on television, playing Sierra Estaban Reyes Montgomery in the daytime series As the World Turns from 1985 to 1988 and in a short reprise in 1994. Carter also had a role in the TV series Monsters as Sheila in "The Mother Instinct" episode. After leaving daytime TV, she guest-starred in a number of television shows and then made her film debut in a starring role in How I Got into College with Anthony Edwards.

In 1990, Carter played Rhonda LeBeck in the comedy monster film Tremors. She later had the recurring role in the drama series China Beach as Nurse Linda Matlock Lanier. In 1992, she played the leading role in the action film Sweet Justice and in 1996 had a supporting part in Rob Reiner's drama Ghosts of Mississippi. The following years, she guest-starred on Law & Order, Murder, She Wrote, Diagnosis: Murder, ER, The Outer Limits, NYPD Blue, Chicago Hope, Judging Amy, Strong Medicine and CSI: Crime Scene Investigation. Carter was also a regular cast member in the short-lived sitcom Secret Service Guy in 1997. She also had a number of leading roles in television movies. Her final screen appearance was in the 2005 independent film Halfway Decent.

== Legal troubles ==
In 2019, Carter was arrested in Las Vegas on multiple felony charges. She was charged with possession of a stolen vehicle and 14 counts of possessing a credit card without the cardholder's consent. She eventually pleaded guilty to lesser charges and received probation.

== Filmography ==
Feature films
Year	Title	Role	Notes
1989	How I Got into College	Nina Sachie	
1990	Tremors	Rhonda LeBeck	nominated—Saturn Award for Best Supporting Actress
1992	Sweet Justice	Sunny Justice	
1996	Ghosts of Mississippi	Cynthia Speetgens	
2005	Halfway Decent	Bonnie	
