= Liberty Stands Still =

2002 Canadian-German film by Kari Skogland

- Official DVD cover
- Directed by: Kari Skogland
- Written by: Kari Skogland
- Produced by: Ogden Gavanski; Gary Pearl
- Starring: Wesley Snipes; Linda Fiorentino
- Music by: Michael Convertino
- Distributed by: Lions Gate Entertainment
- Release date: January 18, 2002
- Running time: 96 minutes
- Countries: Canada, Germany
- Language: English
- Budget: $11 million

Liberty Stands Still is a 2002 Canadian-German crime thriller drama film starring Wesley Snipes and Linda Fiorentino. Directed by Kari Skogland, it is a thriller about a man seeking revenge for his daughter's death. Following its screening at the Palm Springs International Film Festival, the film failed to get a proper theatrical release and was released straight to DVD on October 22, 2002.

== Plot ==
Liberty Wallace (Linda Fiorentino) is the Vice President of Marketing for McCloud Industries, one of the largest gun manufacturers in the United States. She's the daughter of the company's founder, and married to the company's ruthless CEO, Victor Wallace (Oliver Platt). While Victor trafficks in international armaments, Liberty takes a break to have a romantic affair with Russell Williams (Martin Cummins), an actor.

The balance of their marriage of convenience shifts when a sniper, Joe (Wesley Snipes), targets Liberty in a busy Los Angeles park on the way to her affair. Joe calls Liberty on her cell phone, ordering her to shackle herself to a nearby vendor’s hot dog cart. Liberty has no intention of acquiescing to Joe's wishes, until he begins shooting. Convinced, she locks herself to the stand, only to learn that it is loaded with explosives. If she calls for help, hangs up the phone, mutes the phone, or fails to co-operate, the bomb will go off. Joe has also armed a bomb against Russell, backstage in his dressing room at the nearby theater.

Liberty realizes she can not buy her way out of the situation, and she is forced to consider Joe's demand for an anti-gun forum. It is revealed that Joe's daughter was fatally shot at school by a classmate, who used a gun manufactured by McCloud Industries. Joe has decided to show Liberty what it is like to be on the other end of the weapon, and the horrors of what she has had a blind hand in for years.

Victor and Liberty have even bartered illegal deals that have resulted in easier access to weapons for street dealers, including the ones who sold the weapon that killed Joe's daughter. Joe wants Liberty to use her political connections and this incident to spark a public debate on the Second Amendment. Despite his past, Joe no longer supports the unequivocal right to bear arms.

Joe tells Liberty that she is going to die, but that she can die as a hero if she exposes her company's shady business dealings and political connections before she's killed. As Joe monitors and records her every move, Liberty reveals secrets about her past, and business dealings.

When Victor, who is also having an affair, finds out that Liberty has been taken hostage, he is torn between protecting himself and allowing Liberty to be killed, or going to help her. At first, it seems that Joe, who is actually a former CIA agent, is using Liberty as bait to attract media attention, but then Joe guns down news reporter Bill Tollman (Jonathan Scarfe), who is also the son of a hawkish U.S. Senator. Joe expresses his belief that this act will cause the Senator to change his pro-gun stance.

Joe calls Victor on his cell phone as Victor is finally acting on his choice to get out of town. While Joe is shaming Victor for leaving his wife to die, Victor suddenly recognizes the voice on the phone as someone he knows personally. Following the phone conversation, Victor orders his car to bring him to where his wife is. When Victor finally arrives on the scene, Joe calls him on his cell phone again, and Victor addresses Joe by the name Alex. They discuss the time they met in Colombia and how Alex had saved Victor’s life there. Victor also apologizes for having won a military medal under false pretenses for whatever transpired while they were in Colombia. Joe/Alex then shoots and kills Victor in front of Liberty. Alex then tells Liberty that it is all up to her now before informing her that a key to her shackles is hidden in a box, underneath the hot dog cart. Liberty retrieves the key and releases herself, and then she runs to Russell's dressing room. Together, they helplessly watch the timer on his bomb count down to zero. When the bomb does not explode, they realize that it was a fake.

Meanwhile, a police SWAT team has figured out which building Joe is hiding in. Before they can get to Joe/Alex he shoots himself under the chin, and dies; but he has already forwarded Liberty's recorded confessions to several newspapers.

== Cast ==
- Wesley Snipes as Agent Alex / Joe
- Linda Fiorentino as Liberty Wallace
- Oliver Platt as Victor Wallace
- Martin Cummins as Russell Williams
- Hart Bochner as Captain Hank Wilford
- Ian Tracey as SWAT Commander Mac Munro
- Fulvio Cecere as Officer Burt McGovern
- Roger Cross as Officer Miller
- Terry Chen as Officer Tom
- Jeff Seymour as Officer Pritchard
- Garvin Cross as CIA Agent #1
- Darryl Scheelar as CIA Agent #2
- Gregory Calpakis as Vince
- Tanya Allen as May
- Michael David Simms as Sal
- Ron Selmour as Dwayne
- Chiara Ohoven as Heidi
- Jonathan Scarfe as Bill Tollman
- Brian Markinson as Rex Perry
- Hilda Van Der Meulen as Emma Alderson
- Connor Widdows as Robbie Tyson
- Shawn Reis as Mel, Bodyguard
- Robert Lewis as Fireman Frank
- Suzette Meyers as Marsha L. Peters, Reporter
- Marrett Green as Gary P. Evans, Reporter
- Jerry Wasserman as Wall Street Man
- Rekha Sharma as Usherette

== Music ==
The techno score was produced and composed by Convertino, and orchestrated with sound design by Film Composer and Film Music Producer Robert Muzingo.

== Release ==
=== Theatrical ===
The film premiered at the Palm Springs International Film Festival on January 18, 2002, originally planned to have a worldwide theatrical release, but due to the film's critical reception, it was released direct-to-video in 2002.

== Reception ==
=== Critical response ===
The film has received mostly negative reviews; critics praised Snipes and Fiorentino's performances, but panned the overall premise. The film was panned by gun-rights supporters as being very anti-gun and portraying all firearm owners in a negative light. Many noted the film's similarities to Joel Schumacher's Phone Booth, another film made around the same time but whose release was delayed due to the D.C. sniper attacks.

On Rotten Tomatoes it has an approval rating of 20% based on reviews from 5 critics.
