= Natalie Becker =

South African actress

- Born: Natalie Bridgette Becker; George
- Education: University of Cape Town
- Occupation: Actress
- Notable work: Tremors 5: Bloodlines

Natalie Bridgette Becker is a South African actress.

== Biography ==
Becker was born in George, Western Cape province and raised in Cape Town. She is of Cape Coloured descent. Becker has spoken about growing up lonely on a small holding because her mother and stepfather were in a mixed-raced marriage that was illegal at the time under apartheid laws in South Africa. She earned a BSocScience degree from the University of Cape Town in 2004. She has two brothers.

Becker started her career as an announcer on Good Hope FM, a regional radio station affiliated with the South African Broadcasting Corporation. Later, she moved into television and was a presenter on the long-running glamour show Top Billing.

As an actress, Becker appeared alongside Meg Ryan and William H. Macy in The Deal (2008), John Malkovich in Disgrace (2008), the film adaptation of J. M. Coetzee's novel of the same name and also starred in Tremors 5: Bloodlines (2015).

== Filmography ==
- Bypass (2017)
- One Day Like Today in London (2017)
- Tremors 5: Bloodlines (2015)
- Death Race: Inferno (2013)
- Strike Back: Vengeance (2012)
- Atlantis: End of a World, Birth of a Legend (TV Movie) (2011)
- Disgrace (2008)
- The Deal (2008)
- The Scorpion King 2: Rise of a Warrior (2008)
- The World Unseen (2007)
