= Tremors 5: Bloodlines =

2015 film by Don Michael Paul

- Promotional release poster
- Directed by: Don Michael Paul
- Screenplay by: Woodrow Truesmith; M.A. Deuce; John Whelpley
- Story by: Woodrow Truesmith; M.A. Deuce; C.J. Strebor
- Produced by: Ogden Gavanski
- Starring: Jamie Kennedy; Pearl Thusi; Michael Gross
- Cinematography: Michael Swan
- Edited by: Vanick Moradian
- Music by: Frederik Wiedmann
- Production company: Universal 1440 Entertainment
- Distributed by: Universal Pictures Home Entertainment
- Release date: October 6, 2015
- Running time: 95 minutes
- Country: United States
- Language: English

Tremors 5: Bloodlines is a 2015 direct-to-video horror monster film directed by Don Michael Paul and produced by Ogden Gavanski. Released on October 6, 2015, it is the fifth film of the Tremors franchise.

The film came 11 years after Tremors 4: The Legend Begins, serving as Universal Pictures’ re-launch of the franchise. This was the first entry in the series made without participation of Stampede Entertainment, the production company formed by the writing team that created the series; Universal chose instead to maintain all creative control.

== Plot ==
Burt Gummer, now a star in his own survivalist web-series, and his new cameraman, Travis Welker, are approached by South African Wildlife Ministry agents Erick Van Wyk and Johan Dreyer, who hire them to deal with Ass-Blasters in South Africa. Flying to the location, Burt befriends their pilot, Den Bravers. When Burt's heavy weaponry is impounded due to South African gun laws, Erick provides them with a small collection of guns he has gathered, though Burt protests that their caliber is far too small to kill the monsters. The team set up their quarters at an animal refuge, where Travis befriends a little girl named Amahle and soon falls for Dr. Nandi Montabu, the girl's mother. This starts a rivalry with a local named Baruti, who is also in love with Nandi.

Two paleontologists celebrate after finding the fossilized remains of a Graboid at a dig, but they are attacked and eaten. Investigating the scene, Burt sees the fossil and realizes that it is a different breed of Graboid. While Travis attends a local tribal dance with Nandi, a refugee worker named Thaba is attacked by an Ass-Blaster and carried off. Burt orders the refuge to be evacuated, then heads out with Erick and Dreyer. They find the Ass-Blaster in a cave, and Burt kills the flying monster, which kills Dreyer when it falls from the sky. When Burt finds that the Ass-Blasters have been laying Graboid eggs, Erick reveals himself to be a poacher, planning to sell the eggs on the black market. He locks Burt in a metal cage and leaves with the eggs.

Travis finds Burt the next day, but when their truck breaks down, they head back to the refuge on foot. In the desert, they find Erick's truck has crashed, and Erick is fleeing from a massive Graboid with detachable, independent tentacles, which Burt dubs "The Queen Bitch". Burt shoots the tentacles, but the Queen Bitch eats Erick. Burt agrees to let Travis go back into the cave to destroy the nest with a grenade, while he contacts the pilot, Den, for transport. In the cave, Travis kills an Ass-Blaster with the grenade but fails to destroy the nest. When Den arrives, Burt uses his helicopter's rockets to destroy the nest.

Den flies them back to their truck and helps repair the damage. Driving back to the refuge, Travis tells Burt that he is his son, the child of a one-night stand in Florida 40 years earlier; having heard of Burt's exploits, Travis wanted to be like his father. At the refuge, the workers are attacked by Ass-Blasters. Nandi, Amahle, and Baruti manage to kill several Ass-Blasters and a Graboid. They head for the village, where they discover that Amahle is hiding a Graboid egg, which is why the creatures have been attacking. The trio is attacked again, and during the confusion, Amahle wanders away with the egg. Burt and Travis arrive, finding the village under siege by the Queen Bitch's tentacles. Travis retrieves the egg, and Baruti gets Amahle to safety.

When the Queen Bitch arrives, Nandi suggests using the daily thunderstorm to kill it. Travis distracts it as the villagers construct a trap. When the storm erupts, Nandi lures the Queen Bitch in with the egg. Lightning bolts, attracted by the metal trap, destroy the egg and the Queen Bitch Graboid. Afterward, Burt accepts Travis as his son and invites him to join him in his work. A mid-credits scene shows Burt and Travis now co-hosting Burt's reality show, and they kill a variety of monsters around the globe.

== Cast ==
- Jamie Kennedy as Travis B. Welker
- Pearl Thusi as Dr. Nandi Montabu
- Rea Rangaka as Baruti
- Brandon Auret as Johan Dreyer
- Nolitha Zulu as Amahle Montabu
- Daniel Janks as Erich Van Wyk
- Sello Sebotsane as Thaba
- Ian Roberts as Den Bravers
- Michael Gross as Burt Gummer
- Natalie Becker as Lucia
- Emmanuel Castis as Dr. Michael Swan

== Production ==
Following the completion of Tremors 4: The Legend Begins, series creators S. S. Wilson and Brent Maddock had finished a script for a proposed fifth installment that would take place in Australia, titled Gummer Down Under. In 2009, despite interest in a fifth film, development had stalled out. In July 2014, development resumed with Don Michael Paul taking reins as director. Series veteran Michael Gross had signed on to return, as Burt Gummer by the end of the month, with production slating to begin in September in South Africa. Wilson, Maddock, Nancy Roberts, and Ron Underwood of Stampede Entertainment were offered executive producer credits, but were given no creative control or involvement with the film, leading to all four turning the offer down. Ogden Gavanski was set to produce while John Whelpley, screenwriter of Tremors 3: Back to Perfection wrote the script, using Wilson and Maddock's initial draft as a basis. In October, Jamie Kennedy was cast the film's co-lead, alongside Gross.

Production began on September 22, 2014 in South Africa.

An inspection of the cave used in the film by a team from the University of the Witwatersrand found hominid fossils. The first fossil found was in a rock on the cave floor below some graffiti left by the film crew.

== Release ==
Tremors 5: Bloodlines was released through Universal Studios Home Entertainment on October 6, 2015 on Blu-ray, DVD and Digital HD. The film premiered on Syfy in early to mid-2016.

== Reception ==
Heather Wixson of DailyDead called the film "a worthy sequel and gives the long dormant series a much-needed jolt". Matt Donato for WeGotThisCovered called the film a "beyond-generic reboot" and that "it brings absolutely nothing noteworthy to the table". Evan Saathoff for Birth.Movies.Death. noted the lack of involvement of S. S. Wilson and Brent Maddock, stating "the attempts to utilize their winning humor and invention fall flat".

It earned $2,704,810 from domestic home video sales.

== Sequel ==
A sequel, Tremors: A Cold Day in Hell, was released on May 1, 2018, with Michael Gross and Jamie Kennedy continuing in their newfound father-son roles as Burt and Travis.
