= List of horror films of 1990 =

A list of horror films released in 1990.

Title	Director(s)	Cast	Country	Notes	Ref.
The Amityville Curse	Tom Berry	Kim Coates, Jan Rubeš, Cassandra Gava	Canada; United States	Fifth film in the "Amityville Horror" series	
Arachnophobia	Frank Marshall	Jeff Daniels, Julian Sands, Harley Jane Kozak, John Goodman	United States		
Baby Blood	Alain Robak	Emmanuelle Escourrou, Jean-François Gallotte, Christian Sinniger	France		
Bandh Darwaza (The Closed Door)	Shyam Ramsay, Tulsi Ramsay	Kunika, Manjeet Kullar	India		
Basket Case 2	Frank Henenlotter	Kevin Van Hentenryck, Annie Ross, Kathryn Meisle	United States	Second enty in Basket Case series	
Beyond Darkness (a.k.a. La Casa 5)	Claudio Fragasso	David Brandon, Barbara Bingham, Gene LeBrock	Italy		
Blood Games	Tanya Rosenberg	Gregory Cummings, Laura Albert	United States		
Bloodmoon	Alec Mills	Leon Lissek, Christine Amor, Ian Williams	Australia		
Blood Salvage	Tucker Johnston	Danny Nelson, John Saxon, Ray Walston	United States		
Brain Dead	Adam Simon	Bill Pullman, Bill Paxton, George Kennedy	United States		
Bride of Re-Animator	Brian Yuzna	Jeffrey Combs, Bruce Abbott, Claude Earl Jones	United States	Second film of Re-Animator film series Based on the works of H. P. Lovecraft	
Buried Alive	Frank Darabont	Jennifer Jason Leigh, Peg Shirley, David Youse	United States	Followed by Buried Alive 2 (1997)	
Buried Alive	Gérard Kikoïne	Donald Pleasence, Karen Witter, John Carradine	South Africa	Produced by Harry Alan Towers; Based on works of Edgar Allan Poe	
Cat in the Brain	Lucio Fulci	Lucio Fulci (as himself), Malisa Longo, Brett Halsey	Italy		
Child's Play 2	John J. Lafia	Alex Vincent, Jenny Agutter, Gerrit Graham	United States	Second enty in Child's Play franchise	
Cthulhu Mansion	Juan Piquer Simón	Frank Finlay, Brad Fisher, Melanie Shatner	Spain	Based on the works of H. P. Lovecraft	
The Dark Side of the Moon	D.J. Webster	Will Bledsoe, Joe Turkel	United States		
Daughter of Darkness	Stuart Gordon	Mia Sara, Jack Coleman, Anthony Perkins	United States		
Dead Girls	Dennis Devine	Angela Eads, Kay Schaber	United States		
Deadly Manor	José Ramón Larraz	Clark Tufts, Greg Rhodes, Claudia Franju	United States/ Spain	Alternative title(s): Savage Lust	
Def by Temptation	James Bond III	James Bond III, Kadeem Hardison, Samuel L. Jackson, Bill Nunn	United States		
Demonia	Lucio Fulci	Brett Halsey, Meg Register	Italy		
The Exorcist III	William Peter Blatty	George C. Scott, Ed Flanders, Brad Dourif	United States	Third enty in The Exorcist franchise	
Fear	Rockne S. O'Bannon	Ally Sheedy, Lauren Hutton	United States		
The First Power	Robert Resnikoff	Lou Diamond Phillips, Tracy Griffith, Jeff Kober	United States		
Flatliners	Joel Schumacher	Kiefer Sutherland, Julia Roberts, Kevin Bacon	United States		
Frankenhooker	Frank Henenlotter	Charlotte Kemp, James Lorinz, Judy Grafe	United States		
Frankenstein Unbound	Roger Corman	John Hurt, Raul Julia, Nick Brimble	United States		
Ghost	Jerry Zucker	Patrick Swayze, Demi Moore, Whoopi Goldberg	United States		
Ghoul School	Timothy O'Rawe	Jackie Martling, Richard Bright	United States		
Graveyard Shift	Ralph S. Singleton	David Andrews, Kelly Wolf, Stephen Macht	United States	Based on a story by Stephen King	
Gremlins 2: The New Batch	Joe Dante	Zach Galligan, Phoebe Cates, John Glover, Christopher Lee	United States	Second enty in Gremlins franchise	
Grim Prairie Tales	Wayne Coe	James Earl Jones, Brad Dourif, Will Hare	United States		
The Guardian	William Friedkin	Jenny Seagrove, Dwier Brown, Carey Lowell, Miguel Ferrer	United States		
The Haunting of Morella	Jim Wynorski	David McCallum, Nicole Eggert, Lana Clarkson	United States	Produced by Roger Corman	
A Holy Place	Djordje Kadijevic	Mira Banjac, Aleksandar Bercek, Branka Pujic	Yugoslavia		
The Hook of Woodland Heights	Michael Savino	Robert W. Allen, Michael Elyanow, Christine McNamara	United States	Short 40-minute film	
I Bought a Vampire Motorcycle	Dirk Campbell	Neil Morrissey, George Rossi, Burt Kwouk	United Kingdom		
I'm Dangerous Tonight	Tobe Hooper	Mädchen Amick, Corey Parker, Anthony Perkins, Dee Wallace	United States		
Jacob's Ladder	Adrian Lyne	Tim Robbins, Elizabeth Peña, Danny Aiello, Ving Rhames	United States	Remade in 2019	
Killer Crocodile II	Giannetto De Rossi	Debra Karr, Anthony Crenna, Thomas Moore	Italy; United States		
Leatherface: The Texas Chainsaw Massacre III	Jeff Burr	Kate Hodge, Viggo Mortensen, William Butler	United States	Third enty in The Texas Chainsaw Massacre franchise	
Linnea Quigley's Horror Workout	Kenneth J. Hall	Linnea Quigley, Randall Harvey, Patricia Harras	United States		
Luther the Geek	Carlton J. Albright	Edward Terry, Stacy Haiduck	United States	a.k.a. Luther the Freak	
Maniac Cop 2	William Lustig	Robert Davi, Bruce Campbell, Claudia Christian	United States	Second enty in Maniac Cop series	
Maniac Nurses Find Ecstasy	Léon Paul De Bruyn	Nicole Gyony, Csilla Farago, Hajni Brown	Belgium; Hungary; United States		
Meridian: Kiss of the Beast	Charles Band	Vernon Dobtcheff, Sherilyn Fenn, Phil Fondacaro	United States	Later retitled The Ravaging in 2016	
Mirage	Bill Crain	Jennifer McAllister, Todd Caldecott	United States		
Mirror, Mirror	Marina Sargenti	Karen Black, Yvonne De Carlo	United States		
Misery	Rob Reiner	Kathy Bates, James Caan, Lauren Bacall	United States	Based on the novel by Stephen King	
Nightbreed	Clive Barker	Craig Sheffer, Anne Bobby, David Cronenberg	Canada; United States	Based on Clive Barker's novel Cabal	
The Night Brings Charlie	Tom Logan	Chuck Whiting, Al Arasim, Keith Hudson	United States		
Night of the Dribbler	Jack Bravman	Fred Travalena, Gregory Calpakis, Flavia Carrozzi	United States		
Night of the Living Dead	Tom Savini	Tony Todd, Patricia Tallman, Tom Towles	United States	Produced by John Russo; Remake of the 1968 film	
Night Shadow	Randolph Cohlan	Kato Kaelin, Alta LaFlame, Orien Richman	United States		
Pale Blood	V.V. Dachin Hsu, Michael W. Leighton	Diana Frank, Frazer Smith, Wings Hauser	United States		
Phantom of the Opera	Tony Richardson	Burt Lancaster, Teri Polo, Charles Dance, Ian Richardson	United States, France, Italy, Germany	Television movie in two parts	
Pledge Night	Paul Ziller	Lawton Paseka, Will Kempe, Arthur Lundquist	United States		
Predator 2	Stephen Hopkins	Danny Glover, Gary Busey, Rubén Blades, Maria Conchita Alonso, Robert Davi, Bill Paxton	United States	Second enty in Predator franchise	
Prom Night III: The Last Kiss	Ron Oliver, Peter R. Simpson	Tim Conlon, Cyndy Preston, David Stratton	Canada	Third enty in Prom Night series	
Psycho IV: The Beginning	Mick Garris	Anthony Perkins, Henry Thomas, Olivia Hussey	United States	Final and prequel television in Psycho franchise	
Puppet Master II	Dave Allen	Elizabeth Maclellan, Collin Bernsen, Gregory Webb	United States	Second enty in Puppet Master film series produced by Charles Band	
The Reflecting Skin	Philip Radley	Viggo Mortensen, Duncan Fraser, Guy Buller	Canada; United Kingdom		
Repossessed	Bob Logan	Charlotte Kemp, Leslie Nielsen, Linda Blair	United States		
Shakma	Tom Logan, Hugh Parks	Christopher Atkins, Amanda Wyss, Ari Meyers, Roddy McDowall	United States		
Shock 'Em Dead	Mark Freed	Troy Donahue, Traci Lords, Laurel Wiley	United States		
Silent Night, Deadly Night 4: Initiation	Brian Yuzna	Neith Hunter, Clint Howard, Maud Adams	United States	Fourth enty in Silent Night, Deadly Night film series	
Singapore Sling	Nikos Nikolaidis	Meredyth Herold, Panos Thanassoulis, Michele Valley	Greece		
The Sleeping Car	Douglas Curtis	David Naughton, Judie Aronson, Kevin McCarthy	United States		
Slumber Party Massacre III	Sally Mattison	Keely Christian, Brittain Frye, M. K. Harris	United States	Produced by Roger Corman	
Sorority House Massacre II	Jim Wynorski	Stacia Zhivago, Michelle Verran	United States		
Soultaker	Michael Rissi	Joe Estevez, Vivian Schilling (also screenwriter)	United States		
The Suckling	Frances Teri	Frank Rivera, Allen Lieb, Bobby Shapiro	United States		
Tales from the Darkside: The Movie	John Harrison	Deborah Harry, Christian Slater, Rae Dawn Chong, Julianne Moore	United States	Based on the works of Arthur Conan Doyle and Stephen King	
Tremors	Ron Underwood	Kevin Bacon, Fred Ward, Finn Carter, Reba McEntire	United States	First enty in Tremors franchise	
Troll 2	Claudio Fragasso	Michael Stephenson, George Hardy, Margo Prey	Italy	Sequel to Troll (1986) produced by Joe D'Amato	
Two Evil Eyes	Dario Argento, George A. Romero	Adrienne Barbeau, E. G. Marshall, Harvey Keitel, Sally Kirkland, Kim Hunter, Martin Balsam	Italy; United States	Based on stories of Edgar Allan Poe	
Watchers II	Thierry Notz	Marc Singer, Tracy Scoggins, Jonathan Farwell	Canada; United States	Sequel to Watchers (1988); Based on a Dean Koontz novel	
Wheels of Terror	Christopher Cain	Sharon Thomas, Fred Sugerman	United States	Television film	
Whispers	Douglas Jackson	Victoria Tennant, Jean LeClerc, Chris Sarandon	Canada	Based on the Dean Koontz novel	
Witchcraft II: The Temptress	Mark Woods	Charles Solomon Jr., Delia Sheppard, Kirsten Wagner	United States	Sequel to Witchcraft (1988)	
Xtro II: The Second Encounter	Harry Bromley Davenport	Jan-Michael Vincent, Paul Koslo, Tara Buckman	Canada/ United Kingdom	Sequel to Xtro (1983)	

== Sources ==
- Hardy, Phil, ed. (1995). The Overlook Film Encyclopedia. Vol. 3. Overlook Press. ISBN 0-87951-624-0.
- Muir, John Kenneth (2011). Horror Films of the 1990s. Jefferson, North Carolina: McFarland. ISBN 978-0-786-48480-5.
- Weldon, Michael (1996). The Psychotronic Video Guide To Film. New York City, New York: Macmillan. ISBN 978-0-312-13149-4.
- Young, R. G. (2000). The Encyclopedia of Fantastic Film: Ali Baba to Zombies. Hal Leonard Corporation. ISBN 1-55783-269-2.
