= List of American films of 1990 =

This is a list of American films released in 1990.

== Box office ==
The highest-grossing American films released in 1990, by domestic box office gross revenue, are as follows:

Highest-grossing films of 1990
| Rank | Title | Distributor | Domestic gross |
|---|---|---|---|
| 1 | Home Alone | 20th Century Fox | $285,631,306 |
| 2 | Ghost | Paramount | $217,761,243 |
| 3 | Dances with Wolves | Orion | $184,208,848 |
| 4 | Pretty Woman | Walt Disney Studios Motion Pictures | $178,406,268 |
| 5 | Teenage Mutant Ninja Turtles | New Line | $135,265,915 |
| 6 | The Hunt for Red October | Paramount | $122,012,643 |
| 7 | Total Recall | Sony | $119,394,840 |
| 8 | Die Hard 2 | 20th Century Fox | $117,540,947 |
| 9 | Dick Tracy | Walt Disney Studios Motion Pictures | $103,738,726 |
| 10 | Kindergarten Cop | Universal | $91,457,688 |

== January–March ==
| Opening | | Title | Production company | Cast and crew | Ref. |
|---|---|---|---|---|---|
| J A N U A R Y | 5 | Henry: Portrait of a Serial Killer | Greycat Films | John McNaughton (director/screenplay); Richard Fire (screenplay); Michael Rooker, Tom Towles, Tracy Arnold | |
| J A N U A R Y | 12 | Downtown | 20th Century Fox | Richard Benjamin (director); Nat Mauldin (screenplay); Anthony Edwards, Forest Whitaker, Penelope Ann Miller, Joe Pantoliano, David Clennon, Art Evans, Rick Aiello, Roger Aaron Brown, Ron Canada, Wanda De Jesus, Francis X. McCarthy, Kimberly Scott, Danuel Pipoly, Vinnie Curto | |
| J A N U A R Y | 12 | Internal Affairs | Paramount Pictures | Mike Figgis (director); Henry Bean (screenplay); Richard Gere, Andy García, Nancy Travis, Laurie Metcalf, Richard Bradford, William Baldwin, Elijah Wood, Annabella Sciorra, Michael Beach, Katherine Borowitz, Faye Grant, Xander Berkeley, John Kapelos | |
| J A N U A R Y | 12 | Leatherface: The Texas Chainsaw Massacre III | New Line Cinema | Jeff Burr (director); David J. Schow (screenplay); Kate Hodge, William Butler, Ken Foree, Toni Hudson, Viggo Mortensen, Joe Unger, R. A. Mihailoff, Tom Everett, Jennifer Banko, Beth DePatie, Duane Whitaker, Miriam Byrd-Nethery, Caroline Williams | |
| J A N U A R Y | 12 | Ski Patrol | Epic Productions | Richard Correll (director); Steven Long Mitchell, Craig W. Van Sickle, Wink Roberts (screenplay); Roger Rose, Yvette Nipar, T. K. Carter, Leslie Jordan, Paul Feig, Sean Gregory Sullivan, Tess Foltyn, George Lopez, Corbin Timbrook, Steve Hytner, Ray Walston, Martin Mull, Dante Hen, Deborah Rose | |
| J A N U A R Y | 19 | Brain Dead | Concorde | Adam Simon (director); Charles Beaumont, Adam Simon (screenplay); Bill Pullman, Bill Paxton, Bud Cort, Nicholas Pryor, Patricia Charbonneau, George Kennedy, Brian Brophy, David Sinaiko, Andy Wood, Maud Winchester, Brent Hinkley | |
| J A N U A R Y | 19 | Everybody Wins | Orion Pictures | Karel Reisz (director); Arthur Miller (screenplay); Debra Winger, Nick Nolte, Will Patton, Jack Warden, Judith Ivey, Kathleen Wilhoite, Frank Converse, James Parisi | |
| J A N U A R Y | 19 | Sweetie | Avenue Pictures Productions | Jane Campion (director/screenplay); Gerard Lee (screenplay); Geneviève Lemon, Karen Colston, Tom Lycos, Jon Darling, Dorothy Barry, Michael Lake, Andre Pataczek, Jean Hadgraft, Paul Livingston, Louise Fox, Ann Merchant, Robyn Frank, Bronwyn Morgan, Sean Fennell, Sean Callinan | |
| J A N U A R Y | 19 | Tremors | Universal Pictures | Ron Underwood (director); Brent Maddock, S. S. Wilson (screenplay); Kevin Bacon, Fred Ward, Finn Carter, Michael Gross, Victor Wong, Bobby Jacoby, Ariana Richards, Reba McEntire, Charlotte Stewart, Tony Genaro, Richard Marcus, Bibi Besch, Conrad Bachmann, Sunshine Parker, Michael Dan Wagner, John Goodwin, John Pappas | |
| J A N U A R Y | 27 | The Image | HBO Pictures / Citadel Entertainment | Peter Werner (director); Brian Rehak (screenplay); Albert Finney, John Mahoney, Kathy Baker, Swoosie Kurtz, Marsha Mason, Spalding Gray, Wendie Jo Sperber, David Clennon, Brett Cullen, Jim Haynie, Robert Schenkkan, Beth Grant, Brad Pitt, Dennis Haskins, Anthony Lucero, Nicholas Cascone, Banks Harper, Robert Aaron, Adilah Barnes | |
| F E B R U A R Y | 2 | Flashback | Paramount Pictures | Franco Amurri (director); David Loughery (screenplay); Dennis Hopper, Kiefer Sutherland, Carol Kane, Paul Dooley, Cliff DeYoung, Richard Masur, Michael McKean | |
| F E B R U A R Y | 2 | Heart Condition | New Line Cinema | James D. Parriott (director/screenplay); Bob Hoskins, Denzel Washington, Chloe Webb, Lisa Stahl Sullivan, Roger E. Mosley, Ja'net Dubois, Alan Rachins, Ray Baker, Jeffrey Meek, Eva LaRue, Clayton Landey | |
| F E B R U A R Y | 2 | A Man Called Sarge | The Cannon Group | Stuart Gillard (director/screenplay); Gary Kroeger, Gretchen German, Jennifer Runyon, Marc Singer, Bobby DiCicco, Andy Bumatai, Howard Busgang, Chris England, Jeffry Wickham, Peter Dennis, Natasha Lyonne, Bruce Jenner, Don LaFontaine, Andy Greenhalgh, Michael Mears, Travis McKenna, Yehuda Efroni | |
| F E B R U A R Y | 2 | Men Don't Leave | The Geffen Company | Paul Brickman (director/screenplay); Barbara Benedek (screenplay); Jessica Lange, Arliss Howard, Joan Cusack, Chris O'Donnell, Kathy Bates, Tom Mason, Charlie Korsmo, Belita Moreno, Jim Haynie, Corey Carrier, Kevin Corrigan, David Cale, Constance Shulman, Rick Rubin, Tom Towles, Richard Wharton, Jane Morris, Deanna Dunagan, Tom Irwin, Gerry Becker, Seka, Shannon Moffett, Mark Hardwick, Lora Zane, Annabel Armour, Peter Miller | |
| F E B R U A R Y | 2 | Stella | Touchstone Pictures / The Samuel Goldwyn Company | John Erman (director); Robert Getchell (screenplay); Bette Midler, John Goodman, Trini Alvarado, Stephen Collins, Marsha Mason, Eileen Brennan, Linda Hart, Ben Stiller, William McNamara, Ashley Peldon, Alisan Porter | |
| F E B R U A R Y | 9 | Hard to Kill | Warner Bros. Pictures | Bruce Malmuth (director); Steven McKay (screenplay); Steven Seagal, Kelly LeBrock, Frederick Coffin, William Sadler, Zachary Rosencrantz, Andrew Bloch, Branscombe Richmond, Charles Boswell, James DiStefano, Dean Norris, Bonnie Burroughs, Lou Beatty Jr., Nick DeMauro, Nick Corello, Justin De Rosa, Stanley Brock, Larry Cedar, Evan James, Tomas Trujillo, Geoffrey Ian Bara, Robert LaSardo, Ernie Lively | |
| F E B R U A R Y | 9 | Loose Cannons | Tri-Star Pictures | Bob Clark (director/screenplay); Richard Christian Matheson, Richard Matheson (screenplay); Gene Hackman, Dan Aykroyd, Dom DeLuise, Ronny Cox, Nancy Travis, Paul Koslo, Dick O'Neill, Robert Prosky, Jan Triska, Leon Rippy, David Alan Grier, S. Epatha Merkerson, Reg E. Cathey, Brad Greenquist, Robert Elliott, Herb Armstrong, Robert Dickman | |
| F E B R U A R Y | 9 | Stanley & Iris | Metro-Goldwyn-Mayer | Martin Ritt (director); Harriet Frank Jr., Irving Ravetch (screenplay); Jane Fonda, Robert De Niro, Swoosie Kurtz, Martha Plimpton, Harley Cross, Jamey Sheridan, Feodor Chaliapin Jr., Zohra Lampert, Loretta Devine, Kathy Kinney, Stephen Root | |
| F E B R U A R Y | 9 | The White Girl | Tony Brown Productions | Tony Brown (director/screenplay); Troy Beyer, Taimak, O.L. Duke, Don Hannah, Michael Spinks, George Kirby, Teresa Yvon Farley, Petronia Paley, Donald Craig, Michael Deurloo, Sherry Williams, Sheldon Tromberg, J.D. Lewis, Kevin Campbell, Winston Hemingway | |
| F E B R U A R Y | 16 | Courage Mountain | Triumph Films | Christopher Leitch (director); Fred Brogger, Mark Brogger, Weaver Webb (screenplay); Charlie Sheen, Leslie Caron, Yorgo Voyagis, Laura Betti, Jan Rubeš, Juliette Caton, Joanna Clarke, Nicola Stapleton, Jade Magri, Kathryn Ludlow | |
| F E B R U A R Y | 16 | Madhouse | Orion Pictures | Tom Ropelewski (director/screenplay); John Larroquette, Kirstie Alley, Alison La Placa, John Diehl, Jessica Lundy, Bradley Gregg, Dennis Miller, Robert Ginty, Wayne Tippit, Paul Eiding, Aeryk Egan, Deborah Otto | |
| F E B R U A R Y | 16 | Nightbreed | 20th Century Fox / Morgan Creek Productions | Clive Barker (director/screenplay); Craig Sheffer, Anne Bobby, David Cronenberg, Charles Haid, Hugh Quarshie, Hugh Ross, Doug Bradley, Catherine Chavelier, Bob Sessions, Malcolm Smith, Oliver Parker, Debora Weston, Nicholas Vince, Simon Bamford, Kim Robertson, Nina Robertson, Christine McCorkindale, Tony Bluto, Bernard Henry | |
| F E B R U A R Y | 16 | Revenge | Columbia Pictures / Rastar Productions | Tony Scott (director); Jeffrey Alan Fiskin (screenplay); Kevin Costner, Anthony Quinn, Madeleine Stowe, Sally Kirkland, Miguel Ferrer, Tomas Milian, James Gammon, Joaquín Martínez, Jesse Corti, John Leguizamo, Joe Santos, Christofer de Oni, Karmin Murcelo | |
| F E B R U A R Y | 23 | Cinema Paradiso | Miramax Films | Giuseppe Tornatore (director/screenplay); Philippe Noiret, Jacques Perrin, Antonella Attili, Pupella Maggio, Salvatore Cascio, Marco Leonardi, Agnese Nano, Enzo Cannavale, Isa Danieli, Leopoldo Trieste, Roberta Lena, Nino Terzo, Leo Gullotta, Tano Cimarosa, Nicola Di Pinto | |
| F E B R U A R Y | 23 | Mountains of the Moon | Tri-Star Pictures / Carolco Pictures | Bob Rafelson (director/screenplay); William Harrison (screenplay); Patrick Bergin, Iain Glen, Richard E. Grant, Fiona Shaw, John Savident, James Villiers, Adrian Rawlins, Peter Vaughan, Delroy Lindo, Bernard Hill, Matthew Marsh, Richard Caldicot, Christopher Fulford, Garry Cooper, Roshan Seth, Omar Sharif, Paul Onsongo, Bheki Tonto Ngema, Martin Okello | |
| F E B R U A R Y | 23 | Rosalie Goes Shopping | Four Seasons Entertainment | Percy Adlon (director/screenplay); Christopher Doherty, Eleanor Adlon (screenplay); Marianne Sägebrecht, Brad Davis, Judge Reinhold, Willy Harlander, John Hawkes, Alex Winter, Bonnie Pemberton, Erika Blumberger, Patricia Zehentmayr, Courtney Kraus, Lisa Fitzhugh, Lori Fitzhugh, David Denney, Dina Chandel, Ed Geldart, John William Galt | |
| F E B R U A R Y | 23 | Where the Heart Is | Touchstone Pictures | John Boorman (director/screenplay); Telsche Boorman (screenplay); Dabney Coleman, Uma Thurman, Joanna Cassidy, Crispin Glover, Suzy Amis, Christopher Plummer, David Hewlett, Maury Chaykin, Dylan Walsh, Sheila Kelley, Ken Pogue | |
| M A R C H | 2 | The Hunt for Red October | Paramount Pictures | John McTiernan (director); Larry Ferguson, Donald E. Stewart (screenplay); Sean Connery, Alec Baldwin, Scott Glenn, James Earl Jones, Sam Neill, Jeffrey Jones, Joss Ackland, Richard Jordan, Tim Curry, Peter Firth, Ronald Guttman, Stellan Skarsgård, Fred Dalton Thompson, Courtney B. Vance, Anthony Peck, Daniel Davis, Tomas Arana, Timothy Carhart, Rick Ducommun, Larry Ferguson, Ned Vaughn, Gates McFadden, Peter Jason, Sven-Ole Thorsen, Andrew Divoff, Shane Black, Anatoly Davydov, Michael Welden, Boris Lee Krutonog, Christopher Janczar, John McTiernan Sr. | |
| M A R C H | 2 | Too Beautiful for You | Orion Classics | Bertrand Blier (director/screenplay); Josiane Balasko, Gérard Depardieu, Carole Bouquet, François Cluzet, Myriam Boyer, Richard Martin, Rolland Blanche, Denise Chalem, Didier Bénureau, Philippe Loffredo, Stéphane Auberghen, Jean-Louis Cordina, Jean-Paul Farré, Philippe Faure, Juana Marques, Flavien Lebarbé, Sylvie Orcier | |
| M A R C H | 9 | Bad Influence | Triumph Films | Curtis Hanson (director); David Koepp (screenplay); Rob Lowe, James Spader, Lisa Zane, Christian Clemenson, Marcia Cross, Kathleen Wilhoite, Grand L. Bush, David Duchovny, Perri Lister, John de Lancie, Lilyan Chauvin, Rosalyn Landor, Tony Maggio, Susan Lee Hoffman, Jeff Kaake | |
| M A R C H | 9 | Coupe de Ville | Universal Pictures / Morgan Creek Productions | Joe Roth (director); Mike Binder (screenplay); Patrick Dempsey, Arye Gross, Daniel Stern, Alan Arkin, Rita Taggart, Annabeth Gish, Joseph Bologna, James Gammon, Ray Lykins, Chris Lombardi, Josh Segal | |
| M A R C H | 9 | The Handmaid's Tale | Metro-Goldwyn-Mayer | Volker Schlöndorff (director); Harold Pinter (screenplay); Natasha Richardson, Faye Dunaway, Robert Duvall, Aidan Quinn, Elizabeth McGovern, Victoria Tennant, Blanche Baker, Traci Lind, Reiner Schöne, Robert D. Raiford, Muse Watson, Bill Owen, David Dukes, Blair Nicole Struble | |
| M A R C H | 9 | House Party | New Line Cinema | Reginald Hudlin (director/screenplay); Christopher "Kid" Reid, Robin Harris, Christopher "Play" Martin, Martin Lawrence, Full Force, Tisha Campbell, A.J. Johnson, Groove B. Chill, Lou B. Washington, Kelly Jo Minter, John Witherspoon, Bebe Drake, Clifton Powell, Desi Arnez Hines II, George Clinton, Barry Diamond, Michael Pniewski, Norma Donaldson, Shaun Baker, Anthony Johnson, Cliff Frazier, Jaime Cardriche, Reginald Hudlin, Warrington Hudlin | |
| M A R C H | 9 | Joe Versus the Volcano | Warner Bros. Pictures / Amblin Entertainment | John Patrick Shanley (director/screenplay); Tom Hanks, Meg Ryan, Lloyd Bridges, Robert Stack, Abe Vigoda, Dan Hedaya, Barry McGovern, Ossie Davis, Amanda Plummer, Nathan Lane, Lisa LeBlanc | |
| M A R C H | 9 | Last of the Finest | Orion Pictures | John Mackenzie (director); Thomas Lee Wright, George Armitage (screenplay); Brian Dennehy, Joe Pantoliano, Jeff Fahey, Bill Paxton, Deborra-Lee Furness, Guy Boyd, Henry Darrow, Michael C. Gwynne, Burke Byrnes, Xander Berkeley, John Finnegan, J. Kenneth Campbell | |
| M A R C H | 9 | Love at Large | Orion Pictures | Alan Rudolph (director/screenplay); Tom Berenger, Elizabeth Perkins, Anne Archer, Kate Capshaw, Annette O'Toole, Ted Levine, Ann Magnuson, Kevin J. O'Connor, Ruby Dee, Barry Miller, Neil Young, Meegan Lee Ochs, Gailard Sartain, Robert Gould, Dirk Blocker | |
| M A R C H | 16 | Blind Fury | Tri-Star Pictures / Interscope Communications | Phillip Noyce (director); Charles Robert Carner (screenplay); Rutger Hauer, Terry O'Quinn, Brandon Call, Noble Willingham, Lisa Blount, Randall "Tex" Cobb, Nick Cassavetes, Rick Overton, Meg Foster, Sho Kosugi, Charles Cooper, Weasel Forshaw, Roy Morgan, Tim Mateer, Sharon Shackelford, Jay Pennison, Tiger Chung Lee | |
| M A R C H | 16 | Blue Steel | Metro-Goldwyn-Mayer | Kathryn Bigelow (director/screenplay); Eric Red (screenplay); Jamie Lee Curtis, Ron Silver, Clancy Brown, Elizabeth Peña, Louise Fletcher, Philip Bosco, Richard Jenkins, Kevin Dunn, Tom Sizemore, Mary Mara, Mike Hodge, Mike Starr | |
| M A R C H | 16 | The Forbidden Dance | Columbia Pictures | Greydon Clark (director); Roy Langsdon, John Platt (screenplay); Laura Harring, Jeff James, Angela Moya, Sid Haig, Shannon Farnon, Linden Chiles, Pilar Del Rey, Ruben Moreno, Barbra Brighton, Richard Lynch, Kid Creole | |
| M A R C H | 16 | Lambada | Cannon Films | Joel Silberg (director/screenplay); Sheldon Renan (screenplay); J. Eddie Peck, Melora Hardin, Adolfo "Shabba-Doo" Quinones, Leticia Vasquez, Dennis Burkley, Rita Bland, Ricky Paull Goldin, Kristina Starman, Matt Feemster, Kayla Blake, Keene Curtis, Lauren Gale, Basil Hofman | |
| M A R C H | 16 | Lord of the Flies | Columbia Pictures / Castle Rock Entertainment / Nelson Entertainment | Harry Hook (director); Jay Presson Allen (screenplay); Balthazar Getty, Chris Furrh, Danuel Pipoly, James Badge Dale, Andrew Taft, Edward Taft, Gary Rule, Michael Greene, Bob Peck | |
| M A R C H | 16 | Nuns on the Run | 20th Century Fox | Jonathan Lynn (director/screenplay); Eric Idle, Robbie Coltrane, Camille Coduri, Janet Suzman, Robert Patterson, Doris Hare, Lila Kaye, Tom Hickey, Robert Morgan, Winston Dennis, Gary Tang, David Forman, Ozzie Yue | |
| M A R C H | 23 | The Fourth War | Cannon Films | John Frankenheimer (director); Kenneth Ross (screenplay); Roy Scheider, Jürgen Prochnow, Tim Reid, Lara Harris, Harry Dean Stanton, Dale Dye, William MacDonald, David Palffy | |
| M A R C H | 23 | Pretty Woman | Touchstone Pictures | Garry Marshall (director); J. F. Lawton (screenplay); Richard Gere, Julia Roberts, Ralph Bellamy, Jason Alexander, Héctor Elizondo, Laura San Giacomo, Julie Paris, Alex Hyde-White, Amy Yasbeck, Elinor Donahue, John David Carson, Judith Baldwin, Laurelle Brooks Mehus, James Patrick Stuart, Dey Young, Larry Miller, Patrick Richwood, Hank Azaria, Amzie Strickland, Lynda Goodfriend, Abdul Salaam El Razzac | |
| M A R C H | 23 | A Shock to the System | Corsair Pictures | Jan Egleson (director); Andrew Klavan (screenplay); Michael Caine, Elizabeth McGovern, Peter Riegert, Swoosie Kurtz, Will Patton, John McMartin, Jenny Wright, Philip Moon, Barbara Baxley, Haviland Morris, Samuel L. Jackson | |
| M A R C H | 30 | Opportunity Knocks | Universal Pictures / Imagine Entertainment | Donald Petrie (director); Mitchel Katlin, Nat Bernstein (screenplay); Dana Carvey, Robert Loggia, Todd Graff, Julia Campbell, Milo O'Shea, James Tolkan, Doris Belack, Sally Gracie, Mike Bacarella, John M. Watson Sr., Beatrice Fredman, Thomas McElroy, Gene Honda, Del Close, Michelle Johnston, Lorna Raver, Judith Scott | |
| M A R C H | 30 | Side Out | Tri-Star Pictures | Peter Israelson (director); David Thoreau (screenplay); C. Thomas Howell, Peter Horton, Harley Jane Kozak, Courtney Thorne-Smith, Christopher Rydell, Terry Kiser, Randy Stoklos, Sinjin Smith, Tony Burton, Kathy Ireland, Martha Velez, Skip O'Brien, Lance E. Nichols, Gianni Russo, Stanley Ralph Ross, Felicity Waterman, Selma Archerd, Hope Marie Carlton | |
| M A R C H | 30 | Teenage Mutant Ninja Turtles | New Line Cinema | Steve Barron (director); Todd W. Langen, Bobby Herbeck (screenplay); Judith Hoag, Elias Koteas, Jay Patterson, Michael Turney, Raymond Serra, James Saito, Toshishiro Obata, Brian Tochi, Corey Feldman, Josh Pais, Robbie Rist, Kevin Clash, David McCharen, Michael McConnohie, Martin P. Robinson, David Forman, David Rudman, Leif Tilden, Ernie Reyes Jr., Kenn Troum, Mak Wilson, Michelan Sisti, Sam Rockwell, Kevin Eastman, Rick Gomez, Skeet Ulrich, Scott Wolf | |

== April–June ==
| Opening | | Title | Production company | Cast and crew | Ref. |
|---|---|---|---|---|---|
| A P R I L | 3 | Catchfire | Vestron Pictures | Dennis Hopper (director); Rachel Kronstadt Mann, Ann Louise Bardach, Alex Cox, Tod Davies (screenplay); Jodie Foster, Dennis Hopper, Dean Stockwell, Vincent Price, John Turturro, Fred Ward, Julie Adams, Catherine Keener, Charlie Sheen, Burke Byrnes, Bob Dylan, Joe Pesci, Alex Cox, Toni Basil | |
| A P R I L | 6 | The Cook, the Thief, His Wife & Her Lover | Palace Pictures / Miramax | Peter Greenaway (director/screenplay); Richard Bohringer, Michael Gambon, Helen Mirren, Alan Howard, Tim Roth, Ciarán Hinds, Gary Olsen, Ewan Stewart, Roger Ashton-Griffiths, Liz Smith, Ian Dury, Diane Langton, Paul Russell, Emer Gillespie, Ron Cook, Alex Kingston, Roger Lloyd-Pack, Bob Goody | |
| A P R I L | 6 | Cry-Baby | Universal Pictures / Imagine Entertainment | John Waters (director/screenplay); Johnny Depp, Amy Locane, Polly Bergen, Susan Tyrrell, Iggy Pop, Ricki Lake, Traci Lords, Kim McGuire, Darren E. Burrows, Kim Webb, Stephen Mailer, Alan J. Wendl, Jonathan Benya, Jessica Raskin, Troy Donahue, Mink Stole, Joe Dallesandro, Joey Heatherton, David Nelson, Patricia Hearst, Robert Tyree, Willem Dafoe, James Intveld, Rachel Sweet | |
| A P R I L | 6 | Ernest Goes to Jail | Touchstone Pictures | John R. Cherry III (director); Charlie Cohen (screenplay); Jim Varney, Gailard Sartain, Bill Byrge, Barbara Tyson, Barry Scott, Randall "Tex" Cobb, Dan Leegant, Charles Napier, Jackie Welch, Jim Conrad, Emily Corbishdale, Andy Stahl, Myke R. Mueller | |
| A P R I L | 6 | The First Power | Orion Pictures / Nelson Entertainment | Robert Resnikoff (director/screenplay); Lou Diamond Phillips, Tracy Griffith, Jeff Kober, Mykel T. Williamson, Elizabeth Arlen, Dennis Lipscomb, Carmen Argenziano, Clayton Landey, Sue Giosa, Oz Tortora, Dan Tullis Jr., Hansford Rowe, Grand L. Bush, Bill Moseley, David Gale, Philip Abbott | |
| A P R I L | 6 | I Love You to Death | Tri-Star Pictures | Lawrence Kasdan (director); John Kostmayer (screenplay); Kevin Kline, Tracey Ullman, Joan Plowright, River Phoenix, William Hurt, Keanu Reeves, James Gammon, Jack Kehler, Victoria Jackson, Miriam Margolyes, Alisan Porter, Jon Kasdan, Heather Graham, Phoebe Cates, Kathleen York, John Billingsley, Shiri Appleby, Henry Beckman, Joe Lando, Lawrence Kasdan | |
| A P R I L | 6 | Impulse | Warner Bros. Pictures | Sondra Locke (director); John DeMarco, Leigh Chapman (screenplay); Theresa Russell, Jeff Fahey, George Dzundza, Alan Rosenberg, Nicholas Mele, Eli Danker, Charles McCaughan, Lynne Thigpen, Shawn Elliott, Angelo Tiffe, Christopher Lawford, Daniel Quinn, Mark Rolston, Russell Curry, Valente Rodriguez, Robert Phalen, Douglas Rowe, Jerry Dunphy, Thomas Rosales Jr. | |
| A P R I L | 6 | In the Spirit | Academy Entertainment | Sandra Seacat (director); Jeannie Berlin, Laurie Jones (screenplay); Jeannie Berlin, Olympia Dukakis, Peter Falk, Melanie Griffith, Elaine May, Marlo Thomas, Philip Schopper, Agda Antonio, Laurie Jones, Phil Harper, Steve Powers, David Eigenberg, Chad Burton, Thurn Hoffman, Mark Boone Junior, Gary Swanson, Rockets Redglare, Roy Nathanson, Michael Emil, Emidio LaVella, Christopher Durang | |
| A P R I L | 13 | Crazy People | Paramount Pictures | Tony Bill (director); Mitch Markowitz (screenplay); Dudley Moore, Daryl Hannah, Paul Reiser, J. T. Walsh, Mercedes Ruehl, Alan North, David Paymer, Bill Smitrovich, Danton Stone, Paul Bates, Dick Cusack, Doug Yasuda, Floyd Vivino, Ben Hammer, David Packer | |
| A P R I L | 13 | The Gods Must Be Crazy II | Columbia Pictures | Jamie Uys (director/screenplay); N!xau, Lena Farugia, Hans Strydom, Eiros, Nadies, Erick Bowen, Treasure Tshabalala, Pierre Van Pletzen, Lourens Swanepoel | |
| A P R I L | 13 | Vital Signs | 20th Century Fox | Marisa Silver (director); Larry Ketron, Jeb Stuart (screenplay); Adrian Pasdar, Diane Lane, William Devane, Norma Aleandro, Jimmy Smits, Jack Gwaltney, Laura San Giacomo, Jane Adams, Tim Ransom, Bradley Whitford, Lisa Jane Persky, Wallace Langham, James Karen, Eric Zoltaszek | |
| A P R I L | 20 | Chattahoochee | Hemdale Film Corporation | Mick Jackson (director); James Hicks (screenplay); Gary Oldman, Dennis Hopper, Frances McDormand, Pamela Reed, Ned Beatty, M. Emmet Walsh, Lee Wilkof, Matt Craven, Richard Portnow, Wilbur Fitzgerald, William Newman | |
| A P R I L | 20 | Lisa | Metro-Goldwyn-Mayer / United Artists | Gary Sherman (director/screenplay); Karen Clark (screenplay); Cheryl Ladd, D. W. Moffett, Staci Keanan, Tanya Fenmore, Jeffrey Tambor, Julie Cobb, Edan Gross | |
| A P R I L | 20 | Miami Blues | Orion Pictures | George Armitage (director/screenplay); Alec Baldwin, Fred Ward, Jennifer Jason Leigh, Charles Napier, Nora Dunn, Obba Babatundé, Jose Perez, Paul Gleason | |
| A P R I L | 27 | The Guardian | Universal Pictures | William Friedkin (director/screenplay); Stephen Volk, Dan Greenburg (screenplay); Jenny Seagrove, Dwier Brown, Carey Lowell, Brad Hall, Miguel Ferrer, Natalia Nogulich, Pamela Brull, Gary Swanson, Willy Parsons, Frank Noon, Theresa Randle, Xander Berkeley, Jack David Walker, Ray Reinhardt, Jacob Gelman | |
| A P R I L | 27 | Q&A | Tri-Star Pictures | Sidney Lumet (director/screenplay); Nick Nolte, Timothy Hutton, Armand Assante, Lee Richardson, Patrick O'Neal, Jenny Lumet, Charles S. Dutton, Luis Guzmán, Paul Calderon, Fyvush Finkel, Dominic Chianese, International Chrysis, Leonardo Cimino, Tommy A. Ford, John Capodice, Victor Colicchio, Olga Merediz, G.W. Bailey, Vincent Pastore | |
| A P R I L | 27 | Spaced Invaders | Touchstone Pictures | Patrick Read Johnson (director/screenplay); Scott Lawrence Alexander (screenplay); Douglas Barr, Ariana Richards, Royal Dano, Gregg Berger, Wayne Alexander, Fred Applegate, J.J. Anderson, Patrika Darbo, Tonya Lee Williams, Kevin Thompson, Jimmy Briscoe, Tony Cox, Debbie Lee Carrington, Tommy Madden, Jeff Winkless, Tony Pope, Joe Alaskey, Bruce Lanoli, Patrick Read Johnson, Kirk Thatcher | |
| A P R I L | 27 | Wild Orchid | Triumph Releasing | Zalman King (director/screenplay); Patricia Louisianna Knop (screenplay); Mickey Rourke, Jacqueline Bisset, Carré Otis, Bruce Greenwood, Assumpta Serna | |
| M A Y | 4 | Last Exit to Brooklyn | Cinecom Pictures / Allied Filmmakers / Bavaria Film | Uli Edel (director); Desmond Nakano (screenplay); Stephen Lang, Jennifer Jason Leigh, Burt Young, Peter Dobson, Jerry Orbach, Stephen Baldwin, Sam Rockwell, Camille Saviola, Ricki Lake, John Costelloe, Christopher Murney, Alexis Arquette, Mark Boone Junior, Rutanya Alda, Colleen Flynn, David Warshofsky, James Harper, Mike Starr, Christopher Curry, Frank Vincent, Hubert Selby Jr., Jason Andrews, James Lorinz, Maia Danziger, Cameron Johann | |
| M A Y | 4 | Short Time | 20th Century Fox / Gladden Entertainment | Gregg Champion (director); John Blumenthal, Michael Berry (screenplay); Dabney Coleman, Matt Frewer, Teri Garr, Barry Corbin, Joe Pantoliano, Xander Berkeley, Kaj-Erik Eriksen, Rob Roy, Tony Pantages, Kim Kondrashoff, Paul Jarrett, Kevin McNulty, Paul Batten, Wes Tritter | |
| M A Y | 4 | Tales from the Darkside: The Movie | Paramount Pictures | John Harrison (director); Michael McDowell, George A. Romero (screenplay); Deborah Harry, Christian Slater, David Johansen, William Hickey, James Remar, Rae Dawn Chong, Matthew Lawrence, Steve Buscemi, Julianne Moore, Robert Sedgwick, George Guidall, Kathleen Chalfant, Ralph Marrero, Alice Drummond, Dolores Sutton, Mark Margolis, Robert Klein, Nicole Rochelle, Vincent Pastore | |
| M A Y | 4 | Tie Me Up! Tie Me Down! | Miramax Films / Lauren Films | Pedro Almodóvar (director/screenplay); Yuyi Beringola (screenplay); Victoria Abril, Antonio Banderas, Loles León, Francisco Rabal, Julieta Serrano, María Barranco, Rossy de Palma, Emiliano Redondo, Manuel Bandera, Agustin Almodovar, Lola Cardona, Francisca Caballero | |
| M A Y | 4 | Without You I'm Nothing | New Line Cinema / Management Company Entertainment Group | John Boskovich (director); Sandra Bernhard (screenplay); Sandra Bernhard, John Doe, Lu Leonard, Steve Antin, Ken Foree, Cynthia Bailey | |
| M A Y | 11 | The Big Bang | Triton Pictures | James Toback (director); James Toback, Anne Marie Keyes, Barbara Traub, Tony Sirico, Fred Hess, Veronica Geng, Jack Richardson, Don Simpson, Elaine Kaufman | |
| M A Y | 11 | Class of 1999 | Lightning Pictures | Mark L. Lester (director); C. Courtney Joyner, Bradley Gregg (screenplay); Bradley Gregg, Traci Lind, Malcolm McDowell, Stacy Keach, Patrick Kilpatrick, Pam Grier, John P. Ryan, Darren E. Burrows, Joshua John Miller, Sharon Wyatt, Brent David Fraser | |
| M A Y | 11 | Def by Temptation | Troma Entertainment / Bonded Filmworks / Orpheus Pictures | James Bond III (director/screenplay); James Bond III, Kadeem Hardison, Bill Nunn, Samuel L. Jackson, Minnie Gentry, Cynthia Bond, Melba Moore, Najee, Freddie Jackson, Michael Michele, Rony Clanton, John Canada Terrell, Steven Van Cleef, Sundra Jean Williams, Z. Wright | |
| M A Y | 11 | Far Out Man | New Line Cinema | Tommy Chong (director/screenplay); Tommy Chong, C. Thomas Howell, Rae Dawn Chong, Shelby Chong, Paris Chong, Martin Mull, Judd Nelson, Michael Winslow, Cheech Marin, Paul Bartel, Bobby Taylor, Reynaldo Rey, Peggy McIntaggart, Al Mancini, Lisa M. Hansen, Cynthia Darlow, Henry Kingi, Rae Allen, Paul Hertzberg | |
| M A Y | 11 | Longtime Companion | The Samuel Goldwyn Company | Norman René (director); Craig Lucas (screenplay); Campbell Scott, Patrick Cassidy, John Dossett, Mary-Louise Parker, Stephen Caffrey, Welker White, Bruce Davison, Mark Lamos, Dermot Mulroney, Michael Schoeffling, Marceline Hugot, Annie Golden, Freda Foh Shen, Brent Barrett, Dan Butler, Robert Joy, Tony Shalhoub, David Drake, Michael Carmine, Melora Creager, Brian Cousins, Robi Martin, Jesse Hultberg, Lee Kimble, Brad O'Hare | |
| M A Y | 11 | A Show of Force | Paramount Pictures | Bruno Barreto (director); Evan Jones, John Strong (screenplay); Amy Irving, Andy García, Lou Diamond Phillips, Robert Duvall, Kevin Spacey, Erik Estrada, Jorge Castillo, Lupe Ontiveros | |
| M A Y | 18 | Bird on a Wire | Universal Pictures / The Badham/Cohen Group | John Badham (director); Louis Venosta, David Seltzer (screenplay); Mel Gibson, Goldie Hawn, David Carradine, Bill Duke, Stephen Tobolowsky, Joan Severance, Jeff Corey, John Pyper-Ferguson, Clyde Kusatsu, Jackson Davies, Florence Paterson, Tim Healy, Kevin McNulty, Christopher Judge, Harry Caesar, Alex Bruhanski, Wes Tritter, Lossen Chambers, Ken Camroux-Taylor, Robert Metcalfe, Blu Mankuma, Jon Garber, Paul Jarrett | |
| M A Y | 18 | Cadillac Man | Orion Pictures | Roger Donaldson (director); Ken Friedman (screenplay); Robin Williams, Tim Robbins, Pamela Reed, Fran Drescher, Lauren Tom, Lori Petty, Annabella Sciorra, Zack Norman, Paul Guilfoyle, Bill Nelson, Eddie Jones, Mimi Cecchini, Tristine Skyler, Judith Hoag, Anthony Powers, Paul Herman, Erik King, Richard Panebianco, Gary Howard Klar | |
| M A Y | 18 | Strapless | Miramax Films | David Hare (director/screenplay); Blair Brown, Bruno Ganz, Bridget Fonda, Alan Howard, Michael Gough, Hugh Laurie, Dana Gillespie, Spencer Leigh, Alexandra Pigg, Suzanne Burden, Camille Coduri, Julie Foy, Jacqui Gordon-Lawrence, Cyril Nri, Imogen Annesley, Ann Firbank, Rohan McCullough, Billie Roche, Gary O'Brien, Julian Bunster, Gedren Heller, Constantin Alexandrov, Edward Lyon, Derek Webster, Jeremy Gagan, Clive Shilson | |
| M A Y | 19 | By Dawn's Early Light | HBO Pictures / Paravision International | Jack Sholder (director); Bruce Gilbert (teleplay); Powers Boothe, Rebecca De Mornay, James Earl Jones, Martin Landau, Darren McGavin, Rip Torn, Jeffrey DeMunn, Peter MacNicol, Glenn Withrow, Ronald William Lawrence, Kieran Mulroney, Nicolas Coster, Ken Jenkins, Randal Patrick, Daniel Benzali, Robert O'Reilly, Ann Gillespie, Glenn Morshower, Dana Kimmell, Jon Paul Steuer, Danielle von Zerneck, Jon Cedar, Richard Speight Jr., Steve Eastin, Mike Gomez, Pat Skipper, Andrew Divoff | |
| M A Y | 22 | The Swordsman | Film Workshop | King Hu (director); Kwan Man-leung (screenplay); Sam Hui, Cecilia Yip, Jacky Cheung, Sharla Cheung, Fennie Yuen | |
| M A Y | 25 | Back to the Future Part III | Universal Pictures / Amblin Entertainment | Robert Zemeckis (director); Bob Gale (screenplay); Michael J. Fox, Christopher Lloyd, Mary Steenburgen, Thomas F. Wilson, Lea Thompson, Elisabeth Shue, Matt Clark, Richard Dysart, Pat Buttram, Harry Carey Jr., Dub Taylor, James Tolkan, Marc McClure, Wendie Jo Sperber, Jeffrey Weissman, Christopher Wynne, Sean Gregory Sullivan, Mike Watson, Hugh Gillin, Burton Gilliam, Bill McKinney, Donovan Scott, Flea, J.J. Cohen, Ricky Dean Logan, Marvin J. McIntyre, Dean Cundey, ZZ Top | |
| M A Y | 25 | Fire Birds | Touchstone Pictures | David Green (director); Nick Thiel, Paul F. Edwards (screenplay); Nicolas Cage, Tommy Lee Jones, Sean Young, Illana Diamant, Dale Dye, Mary Ellen Trainor, J.A. Preston, Peter Onorati, Gabriel López, Marshall R. Teague, Cylk Cozart, Bryan Kestner, Charles Lanyer, Charles Kahlenberg, Gregory Vahanian, Robert Lujan, Scott Williamson, Mickey Yablans, Bert Rhine, Peter Michaels, Richard Soto | |
| M A Y | 25 | Jesus of Montreal | Orion Classics | Denys Arcand (director/screenplay); Lothaire Bluteau, Catherine Wilkening, Johanne-Marie Tremblay, Rémy Girard, Robert Lepage, Gilles Pelletier, Roy Dupuis, Yves Jacques, Cédric Noël, Denys Arcand, Pauline Martin, Veronique Le Flaguais, Jean-Louis Millette, Monique Miller, Paule Baillargeon, Marc Messier, Marcel Sabourin, Claude Blanchard, Andrée Lachapelle, Denis Bouchard, Ron Lea, Tom Rack, Marie-Christine Barrault, Judith Magre, Dominique Quesnel, Sylvie Drapeau, Richard Dumont, Michael Rudder, Vlasta Vrana, Françoise Robertson | |
| J U N E | 1 | Frankenhooker | Shapiro-Glickenhaus Entertainment | Frank Henenlotter (director/screenplay); Robert "Bob" Martin (screenplay); Patty Mullen, Louise Lasser, James Lorinz | |
| J U N E | 1 | Total Recall | Tri-Star Pictures / Carolco Pictures | Paul Verhoeven (director); Ronald Shusett, Dan O'Bannon, Gary Goldman (screenplay); Arnold Schwarzenegger, Sharon Stone, Rachel Ticotin, Michael Ironside, Ronny Cox, Mel Johnson Jr., Marshall Bell, Roy Brocksmith, Ray Baker, Michael Champion, Rosemary Dunsmore, Robert Costanzo, Marc Alaimo, Dean Norris, Debbie Lee Carrington, Lycia Naff, Michael Gregory, Mickey Jones, Roger Cudney, Sasha Rionda, Robert Picardo, Kamala Lopez, Bob Bergen, Joe Unger, Elizabeth Dennehy, Terry Richards | |
| J U N E | 8 | Another 48 Hrs. | Paramount Pictures | Walter Hill (director); John Fasano, Jeb Stuart, Larry Gross (screenplay); Eddie Murphy, Nick Nolte, Andrew Divoff, Brion James, Kevin Tighe, Ed O'Ross, David Anthony Marshall, Bernie Casey, Brent Jennings, Ted Markland, Tisha Campbell, Felice Orlandi, Dennis Hayden, Ken Medlock, Allan Graf, Nancy Everhard, Biff Yeager, Steve Monroe, George Cheung, Dana Hee, Kitten Natividad, Russ McCubbin, Frank McRae | |
| J U N E | 8 | How to Make Love to a Negro Without Getting Tired | Angelika Films | Jacques W. Benoit (director); Dany Laferrière (screenplay); Isaach De Bankolé, Maka Kotto, Roberta Weiss, Myriam Cyr, Jacques Legras, Julien Poulin, Roy Dupuis, Denis Trudel, Luc Picard, Dany Laferrière, Fayolle Jean, Marie-Josée Gauthier, Suzanne Almgren, Alexandra Innes, Nathalie Coupel, Isabelle L'Ecuyer, Patricia Tulasne, Tracy Ray, Dominique James, Nathalie Talbot, Antoine Durand, Mark Bromilow | |
| J U N E | 10 | Deceptions | Showtime Networks / Alpha Entertainment / Republic Pictures Home Video | Ruben Preuss (director); Ken Denbow, Richard Taylor (screenplay); Harry Hamlin, Robert Davi, Nicollette Sheridan, Marshall Colt, Kevin King, Ben Mittleman, John Levinson, Jack Behr | |
| J U N E | 15 | Dick Tracy | Touchstone Pictures | Warren Beatty (director); Jim Cash, Jack Epps Jr. (screenplay); Warren Beatty, Madonna, Al Pacino, Glenne Headly, Charlie Korsmo, James Keane, Seymour Cassel, Michael J. Pollard, Charles Durning, Dick Van Dyke, Frank Campanella, Kathy Bates, Dustin Hoffman, William Forsythe, Ed O'Ross, James Tolkan, Mandy Patinkin, R. G. Armstrong, Henry Silva, Paul Sorvino, James Caan, Catherine O'Hara, Michael G. Hagerty, Arthur Malet, Bert Remsen, Jack Kehoe, Mary Woronov, Estelle Parsons, Hamilton Camp, Bing Russell, Robert Costanzo, Marshall Bell, Allen Garfield, John Schuck, Charles Fleischer, Walker Edmiston, John Moschitta Jr., Neil Ross, Colm Meaney, Mike Mazurki, Ian Wolfe, Chuck Hicks, Neil Summers, Stig Eldred, Lawrence Steven Meyers, Robert Beecher, Rita Bland, Lada Boder, Dee Hengstler, Liz Imperio, Michelle Johnston, Karyne Ortega, Karen Russell, Lew Horn, Michael Donovan O'Donnell, Jim Wilkey | |
| J U N E | 15 | Gremlins 2: The New Batch | Warner Bros. Pictures / Amblin Entertainment | Joe Dante (director); Charles S. Haas (screenplay); Zach Galligan, Phoebe Cates, John Glover, Robert Prosky, Robert Picardo, Christopher Lee, Haviland Morris, Dick Miller, Jackie Joseph, Gedde Watanabe, Keye Luke, Kathleen Freeman, Don Stanton, Dan Stanton, Shawn Nelson, Archie Hahn, Ron Fassler, Jason Presson, Patrika Darbo, Jerry Goldsmith, Rick Ducommun, John Capodice, Belinda Balaski, Paul Bartel, Kenneth Tobey, Raymond Cruz, Julia Sweeney, Charles S. Haas, Isiah Whitlock Jr., Dean Norris, John Astin, Henry Gibson, Leonard Maltin, Hulk Hogan, Dick Butkus, Bubba Smith, Howie Mandel, Tony Randall, Frank Welker, Kirk R. Thatcher, Mark Dodson, Neil Ross, Jeff Bergman, Joe Dante, Michael Sheehan, Nancy McConnor | |
| J U N E | 22 | Betsy's Wedding | Touchstone Pictures | Alan Alda (director/screenplay); Alan Alda, Molly Ringwald, Ally Sheedy, Madeline Kahn, Joe Pesci, Joey Bishop, Anthony LaPaglia, Burt Young, Catherine O'Hara, Julie Bovasso, Nicolas Coster, Bibi Besch, Dylan Walsh, Camille Saviola, Allan Rich, Sully Boyar, Monica Carr, Frankie R. Faison, Tom Mardirosian, Larry Block, Helen Hanft, Samuel L. Jackson | |
| J U N E | 22 | May Fools | Orion Classics | Louis Malle (director/screenplay); Jean-Claude Carrière (screenplay); Michel Piccoli, Miou-Miou, Michel Duchaussoy, Dominique Blanc, Harriet Walter, Bruno Carette, Paulette Dubost, François Berléand, Valérie Lemercier, Jeanne Herry-Leclerc, Martine Gautier, Rozenne Le Tallec, Renaud Danner | |
| J U N E | 22 | RoboCop 2 | Orion Pictures | Irvin Kershner (director); Frank Miller, Walon Green (screenplay); Peter Weller, Nancy Allen, Dan O'Herlihy, Belinda Bauer, Felton Perry, Tom Noonan, Willard E. Pugh, Gabriel Damon, Galyn Görg, Stephen Lee, Robert DoQui, Ken Lerner, Jeff McCarthy, Thomas Rosales Jr., Tzi Ma, Wanda De Jesus, George Cheung, Phil Rubenstein, Roger Aaron Brown, Mark Rolston, Gary Bullock, Linda Thompson, John Glover, Mario Machado, Leeza Gibbons, John Ingle, Fabiana Udenio, Bill Bolender, Wayne Dehart, Rutherford Cravens, Patricia Charbonneau, Carl Ciarfalio, Craig Hayes, Irvin Kershner, Frank Miller, John Doolittle, Angie Bolling, Brandon Smith, Michael Medeiros, Barry Martin, Jerry L. Nelson, Martin Casella, Adam Faraizl | |
| J U N E | 24 | Framed | HBO Pictures | Dean Parisot (director); Gary Rosen (screenplay); Jeff Goldblum, Kristin Scott Thomas, Todd Graff, Michael Lerner, Abdul Salaam El Razzac, James Hong, Don Amendolia, Carel Struycken, Joel Swetow, Vladimir Skomarovsky, Mary Pat Gleason, Jordan Lund | |
| J U N E | 27 | Days of Thunder | Paramount Pictures / Don Simpson/Jerry Bruckheimer Films | Tony Scott (director); Robert Towne (screenplay); Tom Cruise, Robert Duvall, Randy Quaid, Nicole Kidman, Cary Elwes, Michael Rooker, Fred Dalton Thompson, John C. Reilly, J. C. Quinn, Caroline Williams, Leilani Sarelle, Chris Ellis, Don Simpson, John Griesemer, Barbara Garrick, Gerald R. Molen, Margo Martindale, Nick Searcy, Richard Petty, Rusty Wallace, Neil Bonnett, Harry Gant, Dr. Jerry Punch, Bob Jenkins | |
| J U N E | 27 | Santa Sangre | Mainline Pictures / Expanded Entertainment | Alejandro Jodorowsky (director/screenplay); Roberto Leoni, Claudio Argento (screenplay); Axel Jodorowsky, Blanca Guerra, Adán Jodorowsky, Guy Stockwell, Thelma Tixou, Sergio Bustamante, Gloria Contreras, Sabrina Dennison, Teo Jodorowsky, Ma. De Jesus Aranzabel, Jesús Juárez, S. Rodriguez, Zonia Rangel Mora | |
| J U N E | 29 | Ghost Dad | Universal Pictures | Sidney Poitier (director); Brent Maddock, S. S. Wilson, Chris Reese (screenplay); Bill Cosby, Kimberly Russell, Salim Grant, Denise Nicholas, Brooke Fontaine, Ian Bannen, Christine Ebersole, Barry Corbin, Dana Ashbrook, Omar Gooding, Arnold Stang, Dakin Matthews, Raynor Scheine, Brian Stokes Mitchell, Donzaleigh Abernathy, Amy Hill, Patrika Darbo, Robin Pearson Rose, Kaleena Kiff, Jonathan Brandis, Cathy Cavadini, Joseph Chapman | |

== July–September ==
| Opening | | Title | Production company | Cast and crew | Ref. |
|---|---|---|---|---|---|
| J U L Y | 4 | Die Hard 2 | 20th Century Fox | Renny Harlin (director); Steven E. de Souza, Doug Richardson (screenplay); Bruce Willis, Bonnie Bedelia, William Atherton, Reginald VelJohnson, Franco Nero, William Sadler, John Amos, Dennis Franz, Art Evans, Fred Dalton Thompson, Tom Bower, Sheila McCarthy, Don Harvey, John Costelloe, Vondie Curtis-Hall, John Leguizamo, Robert Patrick, Tom Verica, Tony Ganios, Michael Cunningham, Peter Nelson, Ken Baldwin, Mark Boone Junior, Robert Costanzo, Patrick O'Neal, Colm Meaney | |
| J U L Y | 6 | Jetsons: The Movie | Universal Pictures / Hanna-Barbera Productions | William Hanna, Joseph Barbera (directors); Dennis Marks (screenplay); George O'Hanlon, Penny Singleton, Tiffany, Patric Zimmerman, Don Messick, Jean Vander Pyl, Mel Blanc, Jeff Bergman, Ronnie Schell, Patti Deutsch, Dana Hill, Paul Kreppel, Russi Taylor, Brad Garrett, B. J. Ward, Steve McClintock, Rick Dees, Frank Welker, Janet Waldo, Susan Silo, Jim Ward, Bruce Cummings, Michael Bell, Rob Paulsen | |
| J U L Y | 11 | The Adventures of Ford Fairlane | 20th Century Fox | Renny Harlin (director); Daniel Waters, James Cappe, David Arnott (screenplay); Andrew Dice Clay, Wayne Newton, Priscilla Presley, Morris Day, Lauren Holly, Maddie Corman, Gilbert Gottfried, David Patrick Kelly, Brandon Call, Robert Englund, Ed O'Neill, Vince Neil, Sheila E., William Shockley, Steve White, Kari Wuhrer, Delia Sheppard, Pamela Segall, Kurt Loder, Phil Soussan, Carlos Cavazo, Randy Castillo, David Bowe, Willie Garson, Diana Barrows, Lala, Jordan Lund, Randy Crenshaw, Tone Loc, Jay Underwood | |
| J U L Y | 13 | Ghost | Paramount Pictures | Jerry Zucker (director); Bruce Joel Rubin (screenplay); Patrick Swayze, Demi Moore, Whoopi Goldberg, Tony Goldwyn, Rick Aviles, Vincent Schiavelli, Gail Boggs, Armelia McQueen, Phil Leeds, Augie Blunt, Stephen Root, Bruce Jarchow, Alma Beltran, Vivian Bonnell, Charlotte Zucker, Arsenio Hall, Steven-Charles Jaffe | |
| J U L Y | 13 | The Invisible Maniac | Republic Pictures | Adam Rifkin (director/screenplay); Noel Peters | |
| J U L Y | 13 | Quick Change | Warner Bros. Pictures | Howard Franklin (director/screenplay); Bill Murray (director); Bill Murray, Geena Davis, Randy Quaid, Jason Robards, Tony Shalhoub, Philip Bosco, Phil Hartman, Bob Elliott, Jamey Sheridan, Stanley Tucci, Kurtwood Smith, Victor Argo, Jack Gilpin, Kathryn Grody, Richard Joseph Paul, Reg E. Cathey, Sam Ayers, Bill Raymond, Garry Goodrow, Jim Ward, Michael Chapman, Gary Howard Klar, Paul Herman | |
| J U L Y | 18 | Arachnophobia | Hollywood Pictures / Amblin Entertainment | Frank Marshall (director); Don Jakoby, Wesley Strick (screenplay); Jeff Daniels, Harley Jane Kozak, John Goodman, Julian Sands, Stuart Pankin, Brian McNamara, Mark L. Taylor, Henry Jones, Peter Jason, James Handy, Roy Brocksmith, Kathy Kinney, Mary Carver, Garette Patrick Ratliff, Frances Bay, Lois de Banzie, Brandy Norwood, Marlene Katz | |
| J U L Y | 20 | The Freshman | Tri-Star Pictures | Andrew Bergman (director/screenplay); Marlon Brando, Matthew Broderick, Bruno Kirby, Penelope Ann Miller, Frank Whaley, Jon Polito, Paul Benedict, Richard Gant, Kenneth Welsh, Pamela Payton-Wright, BD Wong, Maximilian Schell, Bert Parks, Leonardo Cimino, Gianni Russo, Jefferson Mappin, Andrew Airlie, Daniel DeSanto, David Was, Don Was | |
| J U L Y | 20 | Navy SEALs | Orion Pictures | Lewis Teague (director); Chuck Pfarrer, Gary Goldman (screenplay); Charlie Sheen, Michael Biehn, Joanne Whalley-Kilmer, Rick Rossovich, Cyril O'Reilly, Bill Paxton, Dennis Haysbert, Paul Sanchez, Nicholas Kadi, Ronald G. Joseph, S. Epatha Merkerson, Gregory McKinney, Rob Moran, Richard Venture | |
| J U L Y | 20 | The Unbelievable Truth | Miramax Films / Possible Films / Action Features | Hal Hartley (director/screenplay); Adrienne Shelly, Robert John Burke, Matt Malloy, Edie Falco, Paul Schulze, Bill Sage, Jeff Howard, Kelly Reichardt, Christopher Cooke, Julia McNeal, Katherine Mayfield, Gary Sauer, Mark Bailey, David Healy | |
| J U L Y | 26 | Blood Oath | Roadshow Entertainment | Stephen Wallace (director); Denis Whitburn, Brian A. Williams (screenplay); Bryan Brown, George Takei, Terry O'Quinn, John Bach, John Clarke, Deborah Kara Unger, John Polson, Nicholas Eadie, David Argue, Ray Barrett | |
| J U L Y | 27 | Chicago Joe and the Showgirl | New Line Cinema | Bernard Rose (director); David Yallop (screenplay); Kiefer Sutherland, Emily Lloyd, Patsy Kensit, Liz Fraser, John Lahr, Harry Fowler, Keith Allen, Angela Morant | |
| J U L Y | 27 | Presumed Innocent | Warner Bros. Pictures | Alan J. Pakula (director/screenplay); Frank Pierson (screenplay); Harrison Ford, Brian Dennehy, Raúl Juliá, Bonnie Bedelia, Paul Winfield, Greta Scacchi, John Spencer, Joe Grifasi, Tom Mardirosian, Anna Maria Horsford, Sab Shimono, Bradley Whitford, Christine Estabrook, Michael Tolan, Jesse Bradford, Joseph Mazzello, Tucker Smallwood, David Wohl, Jeffrey Wright | |
| J U L Y | 27 | Problem Child | Universal Pictures / Imagine Entertainment | Dennis Dugan (director); Scott Alexander, Larry Karaszewski (screenplay); John Ritter, Michael Oliver, Jack Warden, Gilbert Gottfried, Amy Yasbeck, Michael Richards, Peter Jurasik, Dennis Dugan, Danny Kamekona, Lico Reyes, Kerry Von Erich, Lee Arnone-Briggs, Catherine Battistone, Robert Bergen, Phillip Glasser, Endre Hules, Richard Kline, Anthony Tyler Quinn, Laura Summer, Dan Woren, Charlotte Akin, Justin Elledge, Ward Emling, Corki Grazer, Helena Humann, Philip Jhin, Melody Jones, Eiichi Edward Kawanabe, Colby Kline, Norma Moore, Eric Poppick, Florence Shauffler, Shaun Shimoda, Jack Willis, Ed Yeager | |
| A U G U S T | 1 | Young Guns II | 20th Century Fox / Morgan Creek Productions | Geoff Murphy (director); John Fusco (screenplay); Emilio Estevez, Kiefer Sutherland, Lou Diamond Phillips, Christian Slater, William Petersen, James Coburn, Alan Ruck, Balthazar Getty, R. D. Call, Jenny Wright, Jack Kehoe, Robert Knepper, Viggo Mortensen, Tracey Walter, Bradley Whitford, Scott Wilson, Leon Rippy, Howie Young | |
| A U G U S T | 3 | DuckTales the Movie: Treasure of the Lost Lamp | Walt Disney Pictures | Bob Hathcock (director); Alan Burnett (screenplay); Alan Young, Terence McGovern, Russi Taylor, Richard Libertini, Christopher Lloyd, June Foray, Chuck McCann, Joan Gerber, Rip Taylor, Charlie Adler, Jack Angel, Steve Bulen, Sherry Lynn, Mickie T. McGowan, Patrick Pinney, Frank Welker | |
| A U G U S T | 3 | Metropolitan | New Line Cinema | Whit Stillman (director/screenplay); Carolyn Farina, Edward Clements, Taylor Nichols, Chris Eigeman, Allison Parisi, Dylan Hundley | |
| A U G U S T | 3 | Mo' Better Blues | Universal Pictures / 40 Acres and a Mule Filmworks | Spike Lee (director/screenplay); Denzel Washington, Spike Lee, Wesley Snipes, Giancarlo Esposito, Robin Harris, Joie Lee, Bill Nunn, John Turturro, Dick Anthony Williams, Cynda Williams, Nicholas Turturro, Jeff "Tain" Watts, Samuel L. Jackson, Leonard L. Thomas, Charlie Murphy, Steve White, Rubén Blades, Abbey Lincoln, Coati Mundi, Deon Richmond, Bill Lee, Branford Marsalis, Doug E. Doug, Tracy Camilla Johns, Monty Ross, Joe Seneca, Flavor Flav, Diahann Carroll | |
| A U G U S T | 10 | Air America | Tri-Star Pictures / Carolco Pictures | Roger Spottiswoode (director); Christopher Robbins, John Eskow, Richard Rush (screenplay); Mel Gibson, Robert Downey Jr., Nancy Travis, Ken Jenkins, David Marshall Grant, Michael Dudikoff, Lane Smith, Art LaFleur, Ned Eisenberg, Marshall Bell, David Bowe, Burt Kwouk, Tim Thomerson, Harvey Jason, Ernie Lively, Burke Byrnes, Greg Kean, Richard Nixon | |
| A U G U S T | 10 | Flatliners | Columbia Pictures | Joel Schumacher (director); Peter Filardi (screenplay); Kiefer Sutherland, Julia Roberts, William Baldwin, Oliver Platt, Kevin Bacon, John Joseph Duda, Kimberly Scott, Joshua Rudoy, Benjamin Mouton, Hope Davis, Patricia Belcher, Beth Grant | |
| A U G U S T | 10 | The Two Jakes | Paramount Pictures | Jack Nicholson (director); Robert Towne (screenplay); Jack Nicholson, Harvey Keitel, Meg Tilly, Madeleine Stowe, Eli Wallach, Rubén Blades, Frederic Forrest, David Keith, Richard Farnsworth, Tracey Walter, Joe Mantell, James Hong, Perry Lopez, Jeff Morris, Rebecca Broussard, Rosie Vela, Van Dyke Parks, Luana Anders, Pia Grønning, Lee Weaver, Faye Dunaway, Tom Waits | |
| A U G U S T | 17 | The Exorcist III | 20th Century Fox / Morgan Creek Productions | William Peter Blatty (director/screenplay); George C. Scott, Ed Flanders, Jason Miller, Scott Wilson, Brad Dourif, Grand L. Bush, Nicol Williamson, Nancy Fish, Tracy Thorne, Demetrios Pappageorge, Barbara Baxley, Harry Carey Jr., George DiCenzo, Tyra Ferrell, Lois Foraker, Don Gordon, Mary Jackson, Zohra Lampert, Ken Lerner, Viveca Lindfors, Lee Richardson, Patrick Ewing, C. Everett Koop, Larry King, Colleen Dewhurst, Samuel L. Jackson | |
| A U G U S T | 17 | My Blue Heaven | Warner Bros. Pictures | Herbert Ross (director); Nora Ephron (screenplay); Steve Martin, Rick Moranis, Joan Cusack, Melanie Mayron, William Irwin, Carol Kane, William Hickey, Deborah Rush, Daniel Stern, Jesse Bradford, Corey Carrier, Seth Jaffe, Robert Miranda, Ed Lauter, Julie Bovasso, Colleen Camp, Gordon Currie, Raymond O'Connor, Troy Evans, Ron Karabatsos, Duke Stroud, Carol Ann Susi, Joel Polis, Larry Block, Arthur Brauss, Ellen Albertini Dow, LaWanda Page, Daniel Riordan, Valerie Wildman, Leonard Termo, Chris M. Allport | |
| A U G U S T | 17 | Taking Care of Business | Hollywood Pictures | Arthur Hiller (director); Jill Mazursky, J.J. Abrams (screenplay); James Belushi, Charles Grodin, Anne De Salvo, Loryn Locklin, Stephen Elliott, Héctor Elizondo, Veronica Hamel, Mako, Gates McFadden, John de Lancie, Burke Byrnes, Andre Rosey Brown, Ken Foree, John Marshall Jones, Stanley DeSantis, Selma Archerd, Stu Nahan, Andrew Amador, Whitby Hertford, Joe Torre, J.J. Abrams | |
| A U G U S T | 17 | Wild at Heart | The Samuel Goldwyn Company | David Lynch (director/screenplay); Nicolas Cage, Laura Dern, Willem Dafoe, Crispin Glover, Diane Ladd, Isabella Rossellini, Harry Dean Stanton, Calvin Lockhart, J. E. Freeman, W. Morgan Sheppard, Grace Zabriskie, Marvin Kaplan, David Patrick Kelly, Freddie Jones, John Lurie, Jack Nance, Pruitt Taylor Vince, Sherilyn Fenn, Frances Bay, Frank Collison, Sheryl Lee, Peter Bromilow, Sally Boyle, Gregg Dandridge, Koko Taylor | |
| A U G U S T | 19 | Women & Men: Stories of Seduction | HBO Showcase | Frederic Raphael, Tony Richardson, Ken Russell (directors); Valerie Curtin, Joan Didion, John Gregory Dunne (screenplay); James Woods, Melanie Griffith, Beau Bridges, Elizabeth McGovern, Molly Ringwald, Peter Weller, Kyra Sedgwick, Philip O'Brien, Louis Mahoney, Dominic Hawksley | |
| A U G U S T | 22 | Pump Up the Volume | New Line Cinema | Allan Moyle (director/screenplay); Christian Slater, Samantha Mathis, Mimi Kennedy, Scott Paulin, Cheryl Pollak, Annie Ross, Ahmet Zappa, Billy Morrissette, Seth Green, Robert Schenkkan, Ellen Greene, Andy Romano, Anthony Lucero, Lala Sloatman, James Hampton | |
| A U G U S T | 24 | After Dark, My Sweet | Avenue Pictures | James Foley (director/screenplay); Robert Redlin (screenplay); Jason Patric, Rocky Giordani, Rachel Ward, Bruce Dern, Mike Hagerty, George Dickerson, Corey Carrier | |
| A U G U S T | 24 | Darkman | Universal Pictures | Sam Raimi (director/screenplay); Chuck Pfarrer, Ivan Raimi, Daniel Goldin, Joshua Goldin (screenplay); Liam Neeson, Frances McDormand, Colin Friels, Larry Drake, Nelson Mashita, Jessie Lawrence Ferguson, Rafael H. Robledo, Dan Hicks, Ted Raimi, Dan Bell, Nicholas Worth, Aaron Lustig, Arsenio 'Sonny' Trinidad, Nathan Jung, Professor Toru Tanaka, William Dear, Julius Harris, Bridget Hoffman, John Landis, Neal McDonough, Stuart Cornfeld, William Lustig, Scott Spiegel, Bruce Campbell, Jenny Agutter, Joel and Ethan Coen, Christopher Doyle, Tony Gardner | |
| A U G U S T | 24 | Delta Force 2: The Colombian Connection | Cannon Films | Aaron Norris (director); Lee Reynolds (screenplay); Chuck Norris, Billy Drago, John P. Ryan, Richard Jaeckel, Paul Perri, Mark Margolis | |
| A U G U S T | 24 | Dreams | Warner Bros. Pictures | Ishirō Honda (director); Akira Kurosawa (director/screenplay); Akira Terao, Martin Scorsese, Mitsunori Isaki, Chishū Ryū, Mieko Harada | |
| A U G U S T | 24 | Life Is Cheap... But Toilet Paper Is Expensive | Silverlight Entertainment / Far East Stars / Forever Profit Investment | Wayne Wang (director/screenplay); Spencer Nakasako, Amir Mokri (screenplay); Cheng Wan Kin, John Chan, Lo Wai, Cora Miao, Bonnie Ngai, Kwan-Min Cheng, Allen Fong, Angela Yu Chien | |
| A U G U S T | 24 | Men at Work | Triumph Films | Emilio Estevez (director/screenplay); Charlie Sheen, Emilio Estevez, Leslie Hope, Keith David, Dean Cameron, John Getz, Hawk Wolinski, John Lavachielli, Geoffrey Blake, Cameron Dye, John Putch, Tommy Hinkley, Darrell Larson, Sy Richardson, Troy Evans, Jim "Poorman" Trenton | |
| A U G U S T | 24 | The Witches | Warner Bros. Pictures | Nicolas Roeg (director); Allan Scott (screenplay); Anjelica Huston, Mai Zetterling, Jasen Fisher, Rowan Atkinson, Jane Horrocks, Charlie Potter, Anne Lambton, Angelique Rockas, Annabel Brooks, Sukie Smith, Bill Paterson, Brenda Blethyn, Jenny Runacre, Emma Relph, Rose English, Nora Connolly, Rosamund Greenwood, Darcy Flynn, Vincent Marzello, Elsie Eide, Grete Nordrå, Ola Otnes, Merete Armand, Jim Carter, Roberta Taylor, Stella Tanner, Barbara Hicks, Michael Palin | |
| A U G U S T | 31 | The Lemon Sisters | Miramax Films | Joyce Chopra (director); Jeremy Pikser (screenplay); Diane Keaton, Carol Kane, Kathryn Grody, Elliott Gould, Rubén Blades, Aidan Quinn, Estelle Parsons, Nathan Lane, Richard Libertini, Sully Boyar | |
| A U G U S T | 31 | Mirror, Mirror | New City Releasing / Orphan Eyes | Marina Sargenti (director/screenplay); Annette Cascone, Gina Cascone, Yuri Zeltser (screenplay); Rainbow Harvest, Karen Black, Yvonne De Carlo, William Sanderson, Kristin Dattilo, Ricky Paull Goldin, Charlie Spradling, Ann Hearn, Stephen Tobolowsky, Scott Campbell, Tom Bresnahan, Dorit Sauer, Pamela Perfili, Traci Lee Gold, Michelle Gold | |
| A U G U S T | 31 | The Shrimp on the Barbie | Unity Pictures | Alan Smithee (director); Grant Morris, Ron House, Alan Shearman (screenplay); Cheech Marin, Emma Samms, Vernon Wells, Bruce Spence, Carole Davis, Terence Cooper, Gary McCormick, Frank Whitten, David Argue, Bruce Allpress, Joel Tobeck, Jonathan Coleman, Jeanette Cronin, June Bishop, Val Lamond, Richard Hanna, Noel Appleby, Eric Liddy, Kim Buchanan | |
| S E P T E M B E R | 8 | Criminal Justice | HBO Showcase | Andy Wolk (director/screenplay); Forest Whitaker, Anthony LaPaglia, Rosie Perez, Jennifer Grey, Tony Todd, Joe Lisi, Chuck Cooper, Don Brockett, Yancey Arias, Saundra McClain, Stephen Pearlman, William Cameron, Bill Dalzell, Charles Sanders, Rick Applegate, Ro'ee Levi, Benjamin J. Cain Jr., Jacquay L. McCall, Marc Field, Patricia Hicok, Lonzo Green, Ellsworth Gearinger, Etta Cox, Peter Wolk | |
| S E P T E M B E R | 9 | Somebody Has to Shoot the Picture | HBO Pictures / Alan Barnette Productions / MCA Television Entertainment | Frank Pierson (director); Doug Magee (screenplay); Roy Scheider, Bonnie Bedelia, Robert Carradine, Andre Braugher, Arliss Howard, Marc Macaulay, Antoni Corone, Tom Nowicki, Tom Schuster, Mark McCracken, Ric Reitz | |
| S E P T E M B E R | 14 | Death Warrant | Metro-Goldwyn-Mayer | Deran Sarafian (director); David S. Goyer (screenplay); Jean-Claude Van Damme, Robert Guillaume, Cynthia Gibb, George Dickerson, Art LaFleur, Patrick Kilpatrick, Joshua John Miller, Hank Stone, Conrad Dunn, Jack Bannon, Abdul Salaam El Razzac, Armin Shimerman, Larry Hankin | |
| S E P T E M B E R | 14 | Hardware | Palace Pictures / Miramax Films | Richard Stanley (director); Steve MacManus, Kevin O'Neill, Richard Stanley (screenplay); Dylan McDermott, Stacey Travis, John Lynch, Iggy Pop, Carl McCoy, William Hootkins, Mark Northover, Paul McKenzie, Lemmy | |
| S E P T E M B E R | 14 | Postcards from the Edge | Columbia Pictures | Mike Nichols (director); Carrie Fisher (screenplay); Meryl Streep, Shirley MacLaine, Dennis Quaid, Gene Hackman, Richard Dreyfuss, Rob Reiner, Mary Wickes, Conrad Bain, Annette Bening, Simon Callow, Gary Morton, CCH Pounder, Robin Bartlett, Barbara Garrick, Anthony Heald, Dana Ivey, Oliver Platt | |
| S E P T E M B E R | 14 | Repossessed | Seven Arts Pictures / Carolco Pictures | Bob Logan (director); Bob Logan (screenplay); Leslie Nielsen, Linda Blair, Ned Beatty, Anthony Starke, Lana Schwab, Thom J. Sharp, Robert Fuller, Jesse Ventura, Gene Okerlund, Bob Zany, Jake Steinfeld, Wally George, Jack LaLanne, Army Archerd | |
| S E P T E M B E R | 14 | State of Grace | Orion Pictures | Phil Joanou (director); Dennis McIntyre (screenplay); Sean Penn, Ed Harris, Gary Oldman, Robin Wright, John Turturro, John C. Reilly, R. D. Call, Joe Viterelli, Burgess Meredith, Marco St. John, Mo Gaffney, Deirdre O'Connell, Thomas G. Waites, Michael Cumpsty, Michael Cunningham | |
| S E P T E M B E R | 14 | White Hunter Black Heart | Warner Bros. Pictures / Rastar Productions | Clint Eastwood (director); Peter Viertel, James Bridges, Burt Kennedy (screenplay); Clint Eastwood, Jeff Fahey, George Dzundza, Alun Armstrong, Marisa Berenson, Charlotte Cornwell, Norman Lumsden, Richard Vanstone, Edward Tudor-Pole, Roddy Maude-Roxby, Richard Warwick, Boy Mathias Chuma, Timothy Spall | |
| S E P T E M B E R | 19 | Goodfellas | Warner Bros. Pictures | Martin Scorsese (director/screenplay); Nicholas Pileggi (screenplay); Robert De Niro, Ray Liotta, Joe Pesci, Lorraine Bracco, Paul Sorvino, Frank Sivero, Tony Darrow, Mike Starr, Frank Vincent, Chuck Low, Frank DiLeo, Henny Youngman, Catherine Scorsese, Charles Scorsese, Suzanne Shepherd, Debi Mazar, Margo Winkler, Jerry Vale, Christopher Serrone, Beau Starr, Kevin Corrigan, Michael Imperioli, Frank Pellegrino, Tony Sirico, Joseph D'Onofrio, Frank Adonis, Marianne Leone, Illeana Douglas, Susan Varon, Samuel L. Jackson, Paul Herman, Daniela Barbosa, Margaret Smith, Frank Albanese, Bob Golub, Tony Lip, Vincent Pastore, Vito Antuofermo, Vincent Gallo, Garry Pastore, Stella Keitel, Peter Onorati, Tobin Bell, Berlinda Tolbert, Isiah Whitlock Jr. | |
| S E P T E M B E R | 21 | Don't Tell Her It's Me | Metro-Goldwyn-Mayer | Malcolm Mowbray (director); Sarah Bird (screenplay); Steve Guttenberg, Jami Gertz, Shelley Long, Kyle MacLachlan, Mädchen Amick, Kevin Scannell, Perry Anzilotti, Beth Grant, O'Neal Compton, Jeannie Epper, Gary Epper, Ron Orbach | |
| S E P T E M B E R | 21 | Funny About Love | Paramount Pictures | Leonard Nimoy (director); Norman Steinberg, David Frankel (screenplay); Gene Wilder, Christine Lahti, Mary Stuart Masterson, Robert Prosky, Stephen Tobolowsky, David Margulies, Wendie Malick, Celeste Yarnall, Anne Jackson, Susan Ruttan, Freda Foh Shen, Robert Hy Gorman, Lorenzo Caccialanza, Paul Collins, Lewis J. Stadlen, Jonathan Tisch, Elizabeth Morehead, Douglas Sills, Regis Philbin, Patrick Ewing | |
| S E P T E M B E R | 21 | Narrow Margin | Tri-Star Pictures / Carolco Pictures | Peter Hyams (director/screenplay); Gene Hackman, Anne Archer, James B. Sikking, J. T. Walsh, M. Emmet Walsh, Susan Hogan, Nigel Bennett, J. A. Preston, Harris Yulin | |
| S E P T E M B E R | 28 | I Come in Peace | Triumph Films | Craig R. Baxley (director); Jonathan Tydor, Leonard Maas Jr., David Koepp, John Kamps (screenplay); Dolph Lundgren, Brian Benben, Betsy Brantley, Matthias Hues, Jay Bilas, Jim Haynie, David Ackroyd, Sherman Howard, Sam Anderson, Alex Morris, Mark Lowenthal, Michael J. Pollard, Jesse Vint, Mimi Cochran, Jack Willis, Tony Brubaker, Brandon Smith, Al Leong | |
| S E P T E M B E R | 28 | King of New York | Seven Arts Pictures / Carolco Pictures | Abel Ferrara (director); Nicholas St. John (screenplay); Christopher Walken, Larry Fishburne, David Caruso, Victor Argo, Wesley Snipes, Janet Julian, Joey Chin, Giancarlo Esposito, Paul Calderón, Steve Buscemi, Theresa Randle, Leonard L. Thomas, Roger Guenveur Smith, Ernest Abuba, Frank Adonis, Erica Gimpel, Robert LaSardo, Harold Perrineau, Lia Chang, Vanessa Angel, Phoebe Legere, Freddie Jackson, Ariane Koizumi, Pete Hamill, David Proval, Carrie Nygren, Frank Gio, James Lorinz, Gary Landon Mills, Alonna Shaw, Jay Julien, Freddy Howard | |
| S E P T E M B E R | 28 | Pacific Heights | 20th Century Fox / Morgan Creek Productions | John Schlesinger (director); Daniel Pyne (screenplay); Melanie Griffith, Matthew Modine, Michael Keaton, Laurie Metcalf, Mako, Carl Lumbly, Dorian Harewood, Nobu McCarthy, Tippi Hedren, Sheila McCarthy, Luca Bercovici, Jerry Hardin, Dan Hedaya, Guy Boyd, Nicholas Pryor, Tracey Walter, F. William Parker, O-Lan Jones, Miriam Margolyes, William Paterson, D.W. Moffett, Barbara Tyson, Dabbs Greer, Florence Sundstrom, Takayo Fischer, Tom Nolan, Hal Landon Jr., Hy Anzell, Beverly D'Angelo, John Schlesinger | |
| S E P T E M B E R | 28 | Texasville | Columbia Pictures / Nelson Entertainment | Peter Bogdanovich (director/screenplay); Jeff Bridges, Cybill Shepherd, Annie Potts, Cloris Leachman, Randy Quaid, Timothy Bottoms, Eileen Brennan, William McNamara | |

== October–December ==
| Opening | | Title | Production company | Cast and crew | Ref. |
|---|---|---|---|---|---|
| O C T O B E R | 5 | Avalon | Tri-Star Pictures / Baltimore Pictures | Barry Levinson (director/screenplay); Armin Mueller-Stahl, Elizabeth Perkins, Joan Plowright, Aidan Quinn, Kevin Pollak, Leo Fuchs, Eve Gordon, Lou Jacobi, Israel Rubinek, Elijah Wood, Curtis Carnathan, Tom Wood, Ronald Guttman | |
| O C T O B E R | 5 | Desperate Hours | Metro-Goldwyn-Mayer | Michael Cimino (director); Lawrence Konner, Mark Rosenthal (screenplay); Mickey Rourke, Anthony Hopkins, Mimi Rogers, Lindsay Crouse, Kelly Lynch, David Morse, Elias Koteas, Shawnee Smith, Danny Gerard, Matt McGrath, Gerry Bamman, Dean Norris, John Finn, Christopher Curry, Peter Crombie, Ellen Parker, Mike Nussbaum, Ellen McElduff, James Rebhorn, John Christopher Jones, Stanley White, Michael Flynn, Jeff Olson | |
| O C T O B E R | 5 | Henry & June | Universal Pictures | Philip Kaufman (director/screenplay); Rose Kaufman (screenplay); Fred Ward, Uma Thurman, Maria de Medeiros, Richard E. Grant, Kevin Spacey, Jean-Philippe Écoffey, Maurice Escargot, Artus de Penguern, Liz Hasse, Brigitte Lahaie, Féodor Atkine | |
| O C T O B E R | 5 | Marked for Death | 20th Century Fox | Dwight H. Little (director); Michael Grais, Mark Victor (screenplay); Steven Seagal, Keith David, Joanna Pacuła, Basil Wallace, Tom Wright, Kevin Dunn, Elizabeth Gracen, Bette Ford, Danielle Harris, Al Israel, Arlen Dean Snyder, Victor Romero Evans, Michael Ralph, Danny Trejo, Jeffrey Anderson-Gunter, Peter Jason, Jimmy Cliff | |
| O C T O B E R | 5 | Miller's Crossing | 20th Century Fox | Joel Coen, Ethan Coen (director/screenplay); Gabriel Byrne, Marcia Gay Harden, John Turturro, Jon Polito, J. E. Freeman, Albert Finney, Steve Buscemi, John McConnell, Mike Starr, Al Mancini, Olek Krupa | |
| O C T O B E R | 5 | Shakma | Castle Hill Productions / Quest Entertainment | Hugh Parks, Tom Logan (director); Roger Engle (screenplay); Christopher Atkins, Amanda Wyss, Ari Meyers, Roddy McDowall | |
| O C T O B E R | 12 | Memphis Belle | Warner Bros. Pictures | Michael Caton-Jones (director); Monte Merrick (screenplay); Matthew Modine, Eric Stoltz, Tate Donovan, D. B. Sweeney, Billy Zane, Sean Astin, Harry Connick Jr., Reed Diamond, Courtney Gains, Neil Giuntoli, David Strathairn, John Lithgow, Jane Horrocks, Mac McDonald | |
| O C T O B E R | 12 | Mr. Destiny | Touchstone Pictures | James Orr (director/screenplay); Jim Cruickshank (screenplay); James Belushi, Linda Hamilton, Jon Lovitz, Hart Bochner, Rene Russo, Michael Caine, Bill McCutcheon, Jay O. Sanders, Maury Chaykin, Pat Corley, Douglas Seale, Courteney Cox, Doug Barron, Jeff Weiss, Jeff Pillars, Kathy Ireland, Bryan Buffington | |
| O C T O B E R | 12 | The Spirit of '76 | Columbia Pictures / Commercial Pictures | Lucas Reiner (director/screenplay); Roman Coppola (screenplay); David Cassidy, Olivia d'Abo, Leif Garrett, Geoff Hoyle, Jeff McDonald, Steve McDonald, Liam O'Brien, Barbara Bain, Julie Brown, Tommy Chong, Devo, Iron Eyes Cody, Don Novello, Carl Reiner, Rob Reiner, Moon Zappa, The Kipper Kids | |
| O C T O B E R | 12 | To Sleep with Anger | The Samuel Goldwyn Company | Charles Burnett (director/screenplay); Danny Glover, Richard Brooks, Paul Butler, Mary Alice | |
| O C T O B E R | 12 | Troll 2 | Metro-Goldwyn-Mayer | Claudio Fragasso (director/screenplay); Michael Stephenson, George Hardy, Margo Prey, Connie McFarland, Deborah Reed, Jason F. Wright, Darren Ewing, Jason Steadman, Ethan Sarphie | |
| O C T O B E R | 12 | Welcome Home, Roxy Carmichael | Paramount Pictures | Jim Abrahams (director); Karen Leigh Hopkins (screenplay); Winona Ryder, Jeff Daniels, Dinah Manoff, Laila Robins, Thomas Wilson Brown, Frances Fisher, Graham Beckel, Sachi Parker, Stephen Tobolowsky, Micole Mercurio, Robin Thomas, Valerie Landsburg, Ava Fabian, Carla Gugino, Beth Grant, Heidi Swedberg, Angela Paton, Joan McMurtrey, Robby Kiger, John Short, Rhonda Aldrich, Rob King, Daniel Fekete | |
| O C T O B E R | 13 | Judgment | HBO Pictures | Tom Topor (director/screenplay); Keith Carradine, Blythe Danner, Jack Warden, David Strathairn, Michael Faustino, Crystal McKellar, Bob Gunton, Dylan Baker, Mitchell Ryan, Robert Joy, Brad Sullivan, Daisy Eagan, Nick Carter, Steve Hofvendahl, Mary Joy, Kimberli Bronson | |
| O C T O B E R | 19 | The Ambulance | Triumph Films | Larry Cohen (director/screenplay); Eric Roberts, James Earl Jones, Megan Gallagher, Red Buttons, Janine Turner, Eric Braeden, Richard Bright, James Dixon, Laurene Landon, Nick Chinlund, Beatrice Winde, Rudy Jones, Stan Lee, Susan Blommaert, Michael O'Hare | |
| O C T O B E R | 19 | Night of the Living Dead | Columbia Pictures | Tom Savini (director); George A. Romero (screenplay); Tony Todd, Patricia Tallman, Tom Towles, McKee Anderson, William Butler, Katie Finneran, Heather Mazur, Bill Moseley, Russell Streiner | |
| O C T O B E R | 19 | Quigley Down Under | Metro-Goldwyn-Mayer | Simon Wincer (director); John Hill (screenplay); Tom Selleck, Laura San Giacomo, Alan Rickman, Chris Haywood, Ron Haddrick, Tony Bonner, Jerome Ehlers, Roger Ward, Ben Mendelsohn, Steve Dodd, Jonathan Sweet, Conor McDermottroe, Karen Davitt, Kylie Foster, William Zappa, Ollie Hall | |
| O C T O B E R | 19 | Reversal of Fortune | Warner Bros. Pictures | Barbet Schroeder (director); Nicholas Kazan (screenplay); Glenn Close, Jeremy Irons, Ron Silver, Uta Hagen, Annabella Sciorra, Fisher Stevens, Jack Gilpin, Christine Baranski, Stephen Mailer, Felicity Huffman, Johann Carlo, Keith Reddin, Mitchell Whitfield, Tom Wright, Michael Lord, LisaGay Hamilton, Julie Hagerty, Bill Camp, John David Cullum, Malachy McCourt, Constance Shulman | |
| O C T O B E R | 19 | White Palace | Universal Pictures | Luis Mandoki (director); Ted Tally, Alvin Sargent (screenplay); Susan Sarandon, James Spader, Jason Alexander, Kathy Bates, Eileen Brennan, Steven Hill, Rachel Chagall, Corey Parker, Renée Taylor, Jonathan Penner, Barbara Howard, Kim Myers, Mitzi McCall | |
| O C T O B E R | 26 | Graveyard Shift | Paramount Pictures / Columbia Pictures | Ralph S. Singleton (director); John Esposito (screenplay); David Andrews, Kelly Wolf, Stephen Macht, Andrew Divoff, Vic Polizos, Brad Dourif, Robert Alan Beuth, Ilona Margolis, Jimmy Woodard, Jonathan Emerson, Minor Rootes, Kelly L. Goodman, Susan Lowden, Joe Perham, Dana Packard, Frank Welker | |
| O C T O B E R | 26 | The Hot Spot | Orion Pictures | Dennis Hopper (director); Nona Tyson (screenplay); Don Johnson, Virginia Madsen, Jennifer Connelly, Jerry Hardin, William Sadler, Charles Martin Smith, Barry Corbin, Leon Rippy, Jack Nance, Virgil Frye | |
| O C T O B E R | 26 | Sibling Rivalry | Columbia Pictures / Castle Rock Entertainment / Nelson Entertainment | Carl Reiner (director); Martha Goldhirsh (screenplay); Kirstie Alley, Sam Elliott, Jami Gertz, Bill Pullman, Carrie Fisher, Scott Bakula, Ed O'Neill, Frances Sternhagen, John Randolph, Bill Macy, Matthew Laurance, Paul Benedict, Patrick Cronin | |
| O C T O B E R | 26 | Soultaker | AIP Home Video | Michael Rissi (director); Vivian Schilling (screenplay); Joe Estevez, Vivian Schilling, Gregg Thomsen, Chuck Williams, Robert Z'Dar, David "Shark" Fralick, Jean Reiner | |
| O C T O B E R | 26 | Tune in Tomorrow | Cinecom Pictures | Jon Amiel (director); Mario Vargas Llosa, William Boyd (screenplay); Barbara Hershey, Keanu Reeves, Peter Falk, Bill McCutcheon, Dedee Pfeiffer, Patricia Clarkson, Richard Portnow, Henry Gibson, Peter Gallagher, Joel Fabiani, Dan Hedaya, Buck Henry, Hope Lange, John Larroquette, Elizabeth McGovern, Richard B. Shull, Anna Thomson, Peter Maloney, Adam LeFevre, Ray McKinnon, The Neville Brothers | |
| N O V E M B E R | 2 | China Cry | Parakletus | James F. Collier (director/screenplay); Julia Nickson, France Nuyen, James Shigeta | |
| N O V E M B E R | 2 | Frankenstein Unbound | 20th Century Fox | Roger Corman (director/screenplay); F. X. Feeney (screenplay); John Hurt, Raúl Juliá, Nick Brimble, Bridget Fonda, Catherine Rabett, Jason Patric, Michael Hutchence, Catherine Corman, Mickey Knox, Terri Treas | |
| N O V E M B E R | 2 | Graffiti Bridge | Warner Bros. Pictures | Prince (director/screenplay); Prince, Morris Day, Jerome Benton, The Time, Jill Jones, Mavis Staples, George Clinton, Ingrid Chavez, Tevin Campbell, Robin Power, Rosie Gaines, Elisa Fiorillo | |
| N O V E M B E R | 2 | Jacob's Ladder | Tri-Star Pictures / Carolco Pictures | Adrian Lyne (director); Bruce Joel Rubin (screenplay); Tim Robbins, Elizabeth Peña, Danny Aiello, Matt Craven, Pruitt Taylor Vince, Jason Alexander, Patricia Kalember, Eriq La Salle, Ving Rhames, Brian Tarantina, Anthony Alessandro, Brent Hinkley, S. Epatha Merkerson, Suzanne Shepherd, Sam Coppola, Kyle Gass, Lewis Black, Antonia Rey, John Capodice, Bellina Logan, Scott Cohen, Bryan Larkin, Becky Ann Baker, Jeff Garlin, Perry Lang, Orson Bean, Macaulay Culkin | |
| N O V E M B E R | 2 | Vincent & Theo | Hemdale Film Corporation | Robert Altman (director); Julian Mitchell (screenplay); Tim Roth, Paul Rhys, Kitty Courbois, Johanna ter Steege, Wladimir Yordanoff, Hans Kesting, Jean-Pierre Cassel, Anne Canovas, Jean-Pierre Castaldi, Féodor Atkine, Adrian Brine, Jip Wijngaarden, Bernadette Giraud, Jean-Denis Monory, Peter Tuinman, Vincent Vallier, Jean-François Perrier | |
| N O V E M B E R | 2 | Waiting for the Light | Triumph Films / Epic Productions / Sarlui/Diamant | Christopher Monger (director/screenplay); Shirley MacLaine, Teri Garr, Clancy Brown, Vincent Schiavelli, John Bedford Lloyd, Colin Baumgartner, Hillary Wolf, Jeff McCracken, Peg Phillips, Jack McGee, Don S. Davis, Ron Lynch | |
| N O V E M B E R | 9 | Child's Play 2 | Universal Pictures | John Lafia (director); Don Mancini (screenplay); Alex Vincent, Jenny Agutter, Gerrit Graham, Christine Elise, Brad Dourif, Grace Zabriskie, Peter Haskell, Beth Grant, Greg Germann, Edan Gross, Adam Wylie | |
| N O V E M B E R | 9 | Guns | Malibu Bay Films | Andy Sidaris (director/screenplay); Erik Estrada, Dona Speir, Devin DeVasquez, Danny Trejo, Cynthia Brimhall | |
| N O V E M B E R | 9 | The Krays | Miramax Films / Fugitive Features / Parkfield Entertainment | Peter Medak (director); Philip Ridley (screenplay); Billie Whitelaw, Tom Bell, Gary Kemp, Martin Kemp, Susan Fleetwood, Charlotte Cornwell, Kate Hardie, Avis Bunnage, Alfred Lynch, Gary Love, Steven Berkoff, Jimmy Jewel, Barbara Ferris, Victor Spinetti, John McEnery, Patti Love, Norman Rossington, Michael Balfour, Jimmy Flint, Michael Joseph Carr, Ian Burfield, Sean Blowers, Murray Melvin, Sadie Frost, Stephen Lewis, John H. Stracey, Angus MacInnes, Vernon Dobtcheff, Jamie Bennett, Jason Bennett, Dave Courtney, Michael Elphick, Frank Jarvis, Lenny McLean, Julia Migenes, Fred Wood | |
| N O V E M B E R | 10 | Psycho IV: The Beginning | Showtime / Universal Television / Smart Money Productions | Mick Garris (director); Joseph Stefano (screenplay); Anthony Perkins, Henry Thomas, Olivia Hussey, CCH Pounder, Warren Frost, John Landis, Kurt Paul, Alice Hirson, Donna Mitchell, Thomas Schuster, Sharen Camille, Bobbi Evors, Doreen Chalmers | |
| N O V E M B E R | 16 | Home Alone | 20th Century Fox / Hughes Entertainment | Chris Columbus (director); John Hughes (screenplay); Macaulay Culkin, Joe Pesci, Daniel Stern, John Heard, Catherine O'Hara, Roberts Blossom, Angela Goethals, Devin Ratray, Gerry Bamman, Terrie Snell, Hillary Wolf, Larry Hankin, Michael C. Maronna, Kristin Minter, Kieran Culkin, Senta Moses, Anna Slotky, Bill Erwin, Gerry Becker, Alan Wilder, Hope Davis, Ken Hudson Campbell | |
| N O V E M B E R | 16 | The Rescuers Down Under | Walt Disney Pictures | Hendel Butoy, Mike Gabriel (directors); Jim Cox, Karey Kirkpatrick, Byron Simpson, Joe Ranft (screenplay); Bob Newhart, Eva Gabor, John Candy, Tristan Rogers, Adam Ryen, George C. Scott, Wayne Robson, Douglas Seale, Frank Welker, Bernard Fox, Peter Firth, Billy Barty, Ed Gilbert, Russi Taylor, Charlie Adler, Jack Angel, Vanna Bonta, Peter Greenwood, Patrick Pinney, Phil Proctor, Mickie McGowan, Carla Meyer, Marii Mak | |
| N O V E M B E R | 16 | Rocky V | United Artists | John G. Avildsen (director); Sylvester Stallone (screenplay); Sylvester Stallone, Talia Shire, Burt Young, Sage Stallone, Richard Gant, Tommy Morrison, Burgess Meredith, Tony Burton, Paul J. Micale, Michael Williams, Kevin Connolly, Al Bernstein, Stu Nahan | |
| N O V E M B E R | 18 | Stephen King's It | ABC / Lorimar Television / DawnField Entertainment / The Konigsberg & Sanitsky Company / Green/Epstein Productions | Tommy Lee Wallace (director/screenplay); Lawrence D. Cohen (screenplay); Harry Anderson, Dennis Christopher, Richard Masur, Annette O'Toole, Tim Reid, John Ritter, Richard Thomas, Tim Curry, Jonathan Brandis, Seth Green, Emily Perkins, Marlon Taylor, Olivia Hussey, William B. Davis, Gabe Khouth, Venus Terzo, Frank C. Turner, Tony Dakota, Chelan Simmons, Garry Chalk, Terence Kelly, Michael Cole, Florence Paterson, Jay Brazeau, Nicola Cavendish, Megan Leitch, Laura Harris, Gary Hetherington, Brandon Crane, Adam Faraizl, Ben Heller, Sheila Moore, Jarred Blancard, Chris Eastman, Michael Ryan, Caitlin Hicks, Steven Hilton, Sheelah Megill, Merrilyn Gann, Susan Astley, Claire Vardiel, Donna Peerless, Steve Makaj, Charles Siegel, Kim Kondrashoff, Noel Geer, Scott Swanson, Tom Heaton, Russell Roberts, Bill Croft | |
| N O V E M B E R | 21 | Dances with Wolves | Orion Pictures / Tig Productions | Kevin Costner (director); Michael Blake (screenplay); Kevin Costner, Mary McDonnell, Graham Greene, Rodney A. Grant, Floyd Red Crow Westerman, Tantoo Cardinal, Jimmy Herman, Nathan Lee Chasing His Horse, Michael Spears, Charles Rocket, Robert Pastorelli, Kirk Baltz, Tom Everett, Maury Chaykin, Wes Studi, Jason R. Lone Hill, Tony Pierce, Larry Joshua, Wayne Grace, Doris Leader Charge, Donald Hotton, Frank P. Costanza | |
| N O V E M B E R | 21 | Hidden Agenda | Hemdale Film Corporation | Ken Loach (director); Jim Allen (screenplay); Frances McDormand, Brian Cox, Brad Dourif, Mai Zetterling, John Benfield, Des McAleer, Jim Norton, Maurice Roëves, Ian McElhinney, Michelle Fairley | |
| N O V E M B E R | 21 | The Nutcracker Prince | Warner Bros. Pictures / Lacewood Productions | Paul Schibli (director); Patricia Watson (screenplay); Kiefer Sutherland, Megan Follows, Peter Boretski, Phyllis Diller, Mike MacDonald, Peter O'Toole, Lynne Gorman, George Merner, Stephanie Morgenstern, Christopher Owens, Diane Stapley, Mona Waserman, Noam Zylberman, Len Carlson, Marvin Goldhar, Keith Hampshire, Elizabeth Hanna, Susan Roman, Theresa Sears | |
| N O V E M B E R | 21 | Predator 2 | 20th Century Fox | Stephen Hopkins (director); Jim Thomas, John Thomas (screenplay); Danny Glover, Gary Busey, Kevin Peter Hall, Rubén Blades, María Conchita Alonso, Bill Paxton, Robert Davi, Adam Baldwin, Kent McCord, Morton Downey Jr., Calvin Lockhart, Steve Kahan, Henry Kingi, Elpidia Carrillo, Lilyan Chauvin, Teri Weigel, Michael Papajohn, Sylvia Kauders, Casey Sander, Pat Skipper, Jim Ishida, Jsu Garcia, Michael Wiseman, Manny Perry, Hal Rayle, Thomas Rosales Jr. | |
| N O V E M B E R | 21 | Robot Jox | Empire International Pictures | Stuart Gordon (director); Joe Haldeman (screenplay); Gary Graham, Anne-Marie Johnson, Paul Koslo, Robert Sampson, Danny Kamekona, Hilary Mason, Michael Alldredge, Jeffrey Combs, Jason Marsden, Hal Yamanouchi, Matteo Barzini, Stuart Gordon, Michael Saad, Ian Patrick Williams, Carolyn Purdy-Gordon, Thyme Lewis, David Cameron | |
| N O V E M B E R | 21 | Three Men and a Little Lady | Touchstone Pictures | Emile Ardolino (director); Charlie Peters (screenplay); Tom Selleck, Steve Guttenberg, Ted Danson, Nancy Travis, Christopher Cazenove, Robin Weisman, Fiona Shaw, John Boswall, Sheila Hancock, Jonathan Lynn, Sydney Walsh, Lynne Marta, Rosalind Allen, Bryan Pringle, Ian Redford, Edwina Moore, Patricia Gaul, Edith Fields, Neil Hunt | |
| N O V E M B E R | 23 | Mr. and Mrs. Bridge | Miramax Films | James Ivory (director); Ruth Prawer Jhabvala (screenplay); Paul Newman, Joanne Woodward, Margaret Welsh, Kyra Sedgwick, Robert Sean Leonard, Simon Callow, Remak Ramsay, Blythe Danner, Austin Pendleton, Gale Garnett, Saundra McClain, Diane Kagan, Robyn Rosenfeld, Marcus Giamatti, Sal Licata | |
| N O V E M B E R | 25 | Descending Angel | HBO Pictures | Jeremy Kagan (director); Robert J. Seigel, Grace Woodard, Alan Sharp (teleplay); George C. Scott, Diane Lane, Eric Roberts, Mark Margolis, Vyto Ruginis, Amy Aquino, Ken Jenkins, Elsa Raven, Richard Jenkins, Jan Rubeš, Philip Akin, George Buza, Aidan Devine, Colin Fox | |
| N O V E M B E R | 30 | Misery | Columbia Pictures / Castle Rock Entertainment / Nelson Entertainment | Rob Reiner (director); William Goldman (screenplay); James Caan, Kathy Bates, Lauren Bacall, Richard Farnsworth, Frances Sternhagen, Graham Jarvis, Julie Payne, Archie Hahn, Gregory Snegoff, Rob Reiner, J.T. Walsh | |
| D E C E M B E R | 1 | Cyrano de Bergerac | Orion Classics | Jean-Paul Rappeneau (director/screenplay); Jean-Claude Carrière, Edmond Rostand (screenplay); Gérard Depardieu, Anne Brochet, Vincent Pérez | |
| D E C E M B E R | 5 | The Grifters | Miramax Films | Stephen Frears (director); Donald E. Westlake (screenplay); John Cusack, Anjelica Huston, Annette Bening, Pat Hingle, Henry Jones, Gailard Sartain, J.T. Walsh, Charles Napier, Noelle Harling, Paul Adelstein, Jeremy Piven, Stephen Tobolowsky, Xander Berkeley, Frances Bay, Sandy Baron, Eddie Jones, Gregory Sporleder, Jeff Perry, Jon Gries, Micole Mercurio, Andy Dick, Juliet Landau, Sy Richardson, Martin Scorsese | |
| D E C E M B E R | 7 | The Rookie | Warner Bros. Pictures | Clint Eastwood (director); Scott Spiegel, Boaz Yakin (screenplay); Clint Eastwood, Charlie Sheen, Raúl Juliá, Sônia Braga, Tom Skerritt, Lara Flynn Boyle, Pepe Serna, Marco Rodríguez, Xander Berkeley, Tony Plana, Hal Williams, Mara Corday, Matt McKenzie, Joel Polis, Jordan Lund, Paul Ben-Victor, Roberta Vasquez | |
| D E C E M B E R | 9 | The Tragedy of Flight 103: The Inside Story | HBO Showcase | Leslie Woodhead (director); Michael Eaton (screenplay); Ned Beatty, Peter Boyle, Vincent Gardenia, Timothy West, Michael Wincott, Sean Pertwee, Richard Howard, Michael Cronin, Jamie Glover, Sasson Gabai, Aharon Ipalé, Christopher Simon, John Shrapnel, Stafford Gordon, Richard Durden, Eric Loren, Colin Stinton, Garrick Hagon, Andrew Robertson, Moshe Ivgy, Paul Birchard, Robin Ellis, Harry Ditson, Stephen Hoye, Emma Martin, Tony Alleff, Tariq Alibai, Cherif Ezzeldin, Mozaffar Shafeie, William Roberts | |
| D E C E M B E R | 12 | Havana | Universal Pictures | Sydney Pollack (director); Judith Rascoe, David Rayfiel (screenplay); Robert Redford, Lena Olin, Raúl Juliá, Alan Arkin, Tomas Milian, Daniel Davis, Tony Plana, Betsy Brantley, Lise Cutter, Richard Farnsworth, Mark Rydell, Vasek Simek, Fred Asparagus, Richard Portnow, Dion Anderson, Carmine Caridi | |
| D E C E M B E R | 12 | The Sheltering Sky | Warner Bros. Pictures | Bernardo Bertolucci (director/screenplay); Mark Peploe (screenplay); Debra Winger, John Malkovich, Campbell Scott, Jill Bennett, Timothy Spall, Eric Vu-An, Amina Annabi, Philippe Morier-Genoud, Nicoletta Braschi, Sotigui Kouyaté, Tom Novembre | |
| D E C E M B E R | 14 | Edward Scissorhands | 20th Century Fox | Tim Burton (director); Caroline Thompson (screenplay); Johnny Depp, Winona Ryder, Dianne Wiest, Anthony Michael Hall, Kathy Baker, Robert Oliveri, Conchata Ferrell, Caroline Aaron, Dick Anthony Williams, O-Lan Jones, Vincent Price, Alan Arkin, Susan Blommaert, John Davidson, Biff Yeager, Aaron Lustig, Alan Fudge, Steven Brill, Peter Palmer, Marc Macaulay, Brett Rice | |
| D E C E M B E R | 14 | Look Who's Talking Too | Tri-Star Pictures | Amy Heckerling (director/screenplay); Neal Israel (screenplay); John Travolta, Kirstie Alley, Olympia Dukakis, Elias Koteas, Twink Caplan, Lesley Ewen, Gilbert Gottfried, Don S. Davis, Bruce Willis, Roseanne Barr, Damon Wayans, Mel Brooks, Neal Israel, Douglas Warhit, Terry David Mulligan, Paul Shaffer, Morris Panych, Rick Avery | |
| D E C E M B E R | 14 | Mermaids | Orion Pictures | Richard Benjamin (director); June Roberts (screenplay); Cher, Bob Hoskins, Winona Ryder, Michael Schoeffling, Christina Ricci, Caroline McWilliams, Jan Miner | |
| D E C E M B E R | 19 | Almost an Angel | Paramount Pictures | John Cornell (director); Paul Hogan (screenplay); Paul Hogan, Elias Koteas, Linda Kozlowski, Doreen Lang, Douglas Seale, Ruth Warshawsky, Parley Baer, Michael Alldredge, David Alan Grier, Larry Miller, Travis Venable, Robert Sutton, Ben Slack, Troy Curvey Jr., Eddie Frias | |
| D E C E M B E R | 19 | Awakenings | Columbia Pictures | Penny Marshall (director); Steven Zaillian (screenplay); Robert De Niro, Robin Williams, John Heard, Julie Kavner, Penelope Ann Miller, Max von Sydow, Ruth Nelson, Alice Drummond, Judith Malina, Anne Meara, Richard Libertini, Keith Diamond, Peter Stormare, Bradley Whitford, Dexter Gordon, George Martin, Laura Esterman, Mary Alice, Steve Vinovich, Charles Keating, Mel Gorham, Vincent Pastore, Vin Diesel | |
| D E C E M B E R | 19 | Hamlet | Warner Bros. Pictures | Franco Zeffirelli (director/screenplay); Christopher De Vore (screenplay); Mel Gibson, Glenn Close, Alan Bates, Paul Scofield, Ian Holm, Helena Bonham Carter, Stephen Dillane, Nathaniel Parker, Michael Maloney, Sean Murray, Trevor Peacock, Pete Postlethwaite, Christopher Fairbank, John McEnery, Richard Warwick, Christien Anholt | |
| D E C E M B E R | 19 | The Russia House | Metro-Goldwyn-Mayer | Fred Schepisi (director); Tom Stoppard (screenplay); Sean Connery, Michelle Pfeiffer, Roy Scheider, James Fox, John Mahoney, Michael Kitchen, J.T. Walsh, Ken Russell, David Threlfall, Klaus Maria Brandauer, Mac McDonald, Nicholas Woodeson, Martin Clunes, Ian McNeice, Colin Stinton, Denys Hawthorne, Nikolai Pastukhov, Jason Salkey, Christopher Lawford, Mark LaMura, Blu Mankuma, Jay Benedict, Simon Templeman, Raisa Ryazanova, Charlotte Cornwell, Aleksandr Yatsko, David Ryall, Constantine Gregory | |
| D E C E M B E R | 21 | The Bonfire of the Vanities | Warner Bros. Pictures | Brian De Palma (director); Michael Cristofer (screenplay); Tom Hanks, Bruce Willis, Melanie Griffith, Morgan Freeman, Kim Cattrall, Saul Rubinek, Alan King, John Hancock, Kevin Dunn, Donald Moffat, Barton Heyman, Norman Parker, Louis Giambalvo, Mary Alice, Kurt Fuller, Robert Stephens, Richard Libertini, Andre Gregory, Clifton James, Beth Broderick, Adam LeFevre, Kirsten Dunst, Geraldo Rivera, F. Murray Abraham, Rita Wilson, Marjorie Monaghan, Troy Winbush, Scotty Bloch, Hansford Rowe, Elizabeth Owens, Malachy McCourt, John Bentley, Don McManus, William Woodson, Shiek Mahmud-Bey, Helen Stenborg, Sam Jenkins, Camryn Manheim, Kirk Taylor, Daniel Hagen, Novella Nelson, Richard Belzer, John Fink, Connie Sawyer, Jennifer Bassey, George Plimpton, John Blyth Barrymore, Debbie Lee Carrington, Terry Farrell, Jack Mulcahy | |
| D E C E M B E R | 21 | Kindergarten Cop | Universal Pictures / Imagine Entertainment | Ivan Reitman (director); Murray Salem, Herschel Weingrod, Timothy Harris (screenplay); Arnold Schwarzenegger, Penelope Ann Miller, Pamela Reed, Linda Hunt, Richard Tyson, Carroll Baker, Christian and Joseph Cousins, Cathy Moriarty, Jayne Brook, Park Overall, Richard Portnow, Bob Nelson, Sarah Rose Karr, Adam Wylie, Angela Bassett, Miko Hughes, Ben Diskin, Odette Yustman, Heidi Swedberg, Tom Dugan, Chi Muoi Lo, Michael Chapman, Catherine Reitman, Jason Reitman, Ross Malinger, Emily Ann Lloyd, Thomas Rosales Jr., Justin Page, Ben McCreary, Krystle and Tiffany Mataras, Amber Reaves, Marissa Rosen | |
| D E C E M B E R | 21 | The Long Walk Home | Miramax Films | Richard Pearce (director); John Cork (screenplay); Sissy Spacek, Whoopi Goldberg, Dwight Schultz, Ving Rhames, Dylan Baker, Erika Alexander, Lexi Faith Randall, Richard Parnell Habersham, Jason Weaver, Crystal Robbins, Cherene Snow, Chelcie Ross, Dan Butler, Philip Sterling, Schuyler Fisk, Mary Steenburgen | |
| D E C E M B E R | 23 | Come See the Paradise | 20th Century Fox | Alan Parker (director/screenplay); Dennis Quaid, Tamlyn Tomita, Sab Shimono, Shizuko Hoshi, Caroline Junko King, Pruitt Taylor Vince, Colm Meaney, Becky Ann Baker, Stan Egi, Ronald Yamamoto, Akemi Nishino, Naomi Nakano, Brady Tsurutani, Elizabeth Gilliam, Shyree Mezick | |
| D E C E M B E R | 25 | Alice | Orion Pictures | Woody Allen (director/screenplay); Mia Farrow, Joe Mantegna, William Hurt, Blythe Danner, June Squibb, Holland Taylor, Peggy Miley, Robin Bartlett, Keye Luke, Judy Davis, Alec Baldwin, Bernadette Peters, Cybill Shepherd, Gwen Verdon, Patrick O'Neal, Diane Salinger, Bob Balaban, Caroline Aaron, James Toback, Elle Macpherson, Lisa Marie, Rachel Miner | |
| D E C E M B E R | 25 | The Godfather Part III | Paramount Pictures | Francis Ford Coppola (director/screenplay); Mario Puzo (screenplay); Al Pacino, Diane Keaton, Talia Shire, Andy García, Eli Wallach, Joe Mantegna, George Hamilton, Bridget Fonda, Sofia Coppola, Richard Bright, Raf Vallone, Franc D'Ambrosio, Donal Donnelly, Helmut Berger, Don Novello, John Savage, Mario Donatone, Vittorio Duse, Enzo Robutti, Al Martino, Franco Citti, Brett Halsey, Robert Cicchini, Michele Russo, Carlos Miranda, Rogerio Miranda, Vito Antuofermo, Mickey Knox, Jeannie Linero, Carmine Caridi, Don Costello, Al Ruscio, Rick Aviles, Michael Bowen, John Abineri, Marino Masé, Dado Ruspoli, Valeria Sabel, Remo Remotti, Anthony Guidera, Jessica DiCicco, Catherine Scorsese, Willie Brown, David Hume Kennerly, Simonetta Stefanelli, Frank Albanese, Sal Borgese, John Cazale, Anton Coppola, Carmine Coppola, Gia Coppola, Ron Jeremy | |
| D E C E M B E R | 25 | Green Card | Touchstone Pictures | Peter Weir (director/screenplay); Gérard Depardieu, Andie MacDowell, Bebe Neuwirth, Gregg Edelman, Robert Prosky, Lois Smith, Ann Dowd, Larry Wright, Ethan Phillips, Mary Louise Wilson, Ronald Guttman, Stephen Pearlman, Ann Wedgeworth, Stefan Schnabel, Simon Jones, Malachy McCourt, John Spencer, Novella Nelson, Rick Aviles, Edward S. Feldman | |

== See also ==
- List of 1990 box office number-one films in the United States
- 1990 in the United States
