= The Hook of Woodland Heights =

- VHS released by Donna Michelle Productions
- Directed by: Michael Savino
- Written by: Mark Veau; Michael Savino
- Produced by: Mark Veau; Michael Savino
- Starring: Robert W. Allen; Michael Elyanow; Christine McNamara
- Cinematography: Jeffrey Bagdasarian; C. Douglas Frauenholz
- Edited by: R. Collins Dickinson
- Music by: Jeffrey Majeau
- Production company: Media House Productions
- Distributed by: Donna Michelle Productions
- Release date: 1990 (United States)
- Running time: 40 minutes
- Country: United States
- Language: English
- Budget: $3,500

The Hook of Woodland Heights is a 1990 horror short film written and directed by Michael Savino, and co-written by Mark Veau.

== Plot ==
Mason Crane, a one-handed man who went on a murderous rampage after committing familicide, is set to be moved from one section of a Woodland Heights psychiatric hospital to another. As soon as Mason's cell is opened, the deranged man crushes an orderly with the door, cuts another's skullcap off with a clipboard, and escapes. Mason makes his way to a wilderness-adjacent home, where he kills a dog, and replaces his missing hand with a bent two-pronged grilling fork. With his new weapon, Mason attacks a group of children playing in a cemetery, stabbing one to death, and scattering the rest.

Mason returns to the woods, where a young couple (Tommy and Katie) have set up at a cottage for some alone time. Nervous due to all the news reports about Mason's escape, Katie convinces Tommy to take her back into town, but the car fails to start. Tommy goes off alone to seek help from a friend named Jimmy who lives nearby, and encounters Mason, who has disemboweled Jimmy. Tommy and Mason fight, with Mason coming out victorious when he stabs Tommy in the crotch. Next, Mason goes after Katie, chasing her through the forest, and into town. Just as Mason is about to kill Katie, he is shot in the head by a bystander.

The film is then revealed to just be a story being told to a group of Cub Scouts. When the storyteller asks the boys if they believe the ghost of Mason Crane still haunts the town, they answer with "No!" The man laughs, turns to the camera (revealing himself to be Mason) and screams, "I do!"

== Cast ==
- Robert W. Allen as Mason Crane
- Christine McNamara as Katie
- Michael Elyanow as Thomas W. Johnson
- David MacWilliams as Orderly #1
- Keeton Arnett as Orderly #2
- Mark Veau as Orderly #3
- Shauna Dian Wharton as Christopher's Mom
- C. Douglas Frauenholz as Christopher's Dad
- Christopher Demoranville as Christopher
- Justin Ballard as Johnny
- Joel D. Seger as Andy Taylor
- Jeff Densmore as Jimmy Tucker
- John Riley as Patient #1
- Jennifer Cowles as Patient #2
- Toni Ballard as Patient #3
- Cindi Lee McTiernan as Nurse #1
- Maria Savino as Nurse #2
- Fred Groll as Mason Crane's Killer
- Wayne Walker as Police Officer
- Amee Desjoury as Kick the Can Player #1
- Brooke A. Miller as Kick the Can Player #2
- Maura Sullivan as Kick the Can Player #3
- Mark Aylward as Kick the Can Player #4
- Matthew Aylward as Kick the Can Player #5
- Andrea Anjehian as Girl in Neighborhood #1
- Lisa Lemon as Girl in Neighborhood #2
- Vanessa Hero as Girl in Neighborhood #3
- Michelle Rock as Girl in Neighborhood #4
- Michael Gordon as Cub Scout #1
- David Dziemian as Cub Scout #2
- Andrew Weagle as Cub Scout #3
- Rick MacKenzie as WAAF Disc Jockey
- Diane Butler as News Reporter #1
- Steve LeVeille as News Reporter #2

== Release ==
The Hook of Woodland Heights was released on VHS in 1990, in a double feature with the fifteen-minute short Attack of the Killer Refrigerator. The tape also included a making-of featurette, cast and crew interviews, promotional footage, and footage of a theatrical screening.

== Reception ==
Critical Condition called the short "fun to watch" and "humorous, gory, and cheesy as hell". eFilm Critic found the film "appealingly goofy" despite the many flaws, and gave it a score of two. Cranked on Cinema wrote "this is a mildly entertaining film" and said that while it was not groundbreaking it was still "impressive as a micro-budget movie". A four out of ten was awarded by Horrorphilia, which concluded "The short running time really saves it. If this was a full-length movie I doubt I could have even made it all the way through".
