= David Forman =

British actor and stuntman

- Born: United Kingdom
- Occupations: Actor, stuntman, puppeteer, internet entrepreneur
- Years active: 1984–present

David Forman is an English actor, stuntman, puppeteer and internet entrepreneur who has played several suit roles in Jim Henson's Creature Shop, notably as the character of Leonardo in the Teenage Mutant Ninja Turtles film (1990). He also served as a stunt performer for The Bear (1988), The NeverEnding Story III (1994), The Flintstones (1994) and Muppet Treasure Island (1996).

== Career ==
Forman represented England on the tumbling squad of the 1980 World Games. Soon after, he was introduced to Rick Baker, who hired him to play an ape in Greystoke (1984). He had also appeared, sans suit, in such films as Nuns on the Run (1990) (with Robbie Coltrane) and Empire State (1987) (with Martin Landau). Forman has also appeared on television, notably in The Casebook of Sherlock Holmes episode The Creeping Man.

Stunt credits include work on Spies Like Us (1985), Superman IV: The Quest for Peace (1987) and The World Is Not Enough (1999). More recently, he served as fight arranger on Batman Begins (2005) and stunt coordinator for the new Doctor Who series.

== Partial filmography ==
As actor

- Greystoke: The Legend of Tarzan, Lord of the Apes (1984) - Primate Sequences
- Empire State (1987) - Stevie Kwon
- Goldeneye (1989, TV Movie) - Ernie Chang
- Nuns on the Run (1990) - Henry Ho
- Teenage Mutant Ninja Turtles (1990) - Leonardo / Gang Member
- Bernard and the Genie (1991, TV Movie) - Leonardo
- The Chief (1994, 1 episode, TV Series) - Cheng Rui
- The NeverEnding Story III (1994) - Rock Biter Jr.
- Into Thin Air: Death on Everest (1997, TV Movie) - Taiwanese Climber #1
- Badger (1999, 1 episode, TV Series) - Sammy Pang
- The Golden Compass (2007) - Samoyed Kidnapper

As stuntman

- Spies Like Us (1985)
- Superman IV: The Quest for Peace (1987)
- To Be the Best (1992)
- Wild Justice (1993) (TV)
- Son of the Pink Panther (1993)
- Lovejoy (1 episode, 1993) (TV)
- Between the Lines (1 episode, 1994) (TV)
- Night Watch (1995) (TV)
- Cold Lazarus (4 episodes, 1996) (TV)
- Daylight (1996)
- Seven Years in Tibet (1997)
- Tomorrow Never Dies (1997)
- The Wisdom of Crocodiles (1998)
- The World Is Not Enough (1999)
- Essex Boys (2000)
- The Mummy Returns (2001)
- Lara Croft: Tomb Raider (2001)
- Georgian Underworld: An Invitation to a Hanging (2002) (TV)
- Die Another Day (2002)
- Walking with Cavemen (1 episode, 2003) (TV)
- Second Nature (2003) (TV)
- The Last Samurai (2003)
- Wimbledon (2004)
- Batman Begins (2005)
- Shadow Man (2006) (V)
- Low Winter Sun (2006) (TV)
- Doctor Who (5 episodes, 2006) (TV)
- Fantastic Four: Rise of the Silver Surfer (2007)
- The Golden Compass (2007)
- Phoo Action (2008) (TV)
- The Mummy: Tomb of the Dragon Emperor (2008)
- TV Burp (2 episodes, 2008–10) (TV)
- Ready Player One (2018) as Player of Chinese Officeman
- Rogue One: A Star Wars Story (2016) as Pedrin Gaul aka Red Five

== Awards and nominations ==
- 2004, won World Stunt Awards Taurus Award for 'Best Fire Stunt' for The Last Samurai
