= The Night Brings Charlie =

- VHS released by Quest Entertainment
- Directed by: Tom Logan
- Written by: Bruce Carson
- Produced by: Wally Parks; Paul Stubenrauch
- Starring: David Carr; Kerry Knight; Joe Fishback; Aimee Tenalia; Chuck Whiting; Monica Simmons
- Cinematography: Glenn Kral
- Edited by: Mike Palma; Thomas Jarvis
- Music by: David C. Williams
- Production company: Quest Studios
- Distributed by: Quest Entertainment
- Release date: August 8, 1990 (United States)
- Running time: 77 minutes
- Country: United States
- Language: English

The Night Brings Charlie is a 1990 American slasher film directed by Tom Logan, and written by Bruce Carson. A sequel, to be written and directed by Bruce Carson, was announced in 2017.

== Plot ==
In the small town of Pakoe, Shannon Davis is beheaded by a man wearing swimming goggles and a burlap sack. Investigating this homicide and a previous one are new sheriff Carl Carson, and mortician Walt Parker. As the bodycount rises and the killer begins taunting the police, suspicion falls on Charlie Puckett, a disfigured gardener who wears a mask similar to the serial killer's.

Charlie is brought in for questioning, but he refuses to talk, so Carson requests help from Walt, who had served alongside Charlie in the Vietnam War. Walt gets Charlie to confess, but Carson has doubts about his guilt, so he sets a trap which flushes out the real killer - Walt. Carson explains that he had looked into Walt's history, and discovered that he had dismembered a civilian in Vietnam, though the charges were dropped. When Carson mentions that Charlie was released from custody, Walt panics, and reveals that Charlie is just like him; Charlie helped him kill the Vietnamese girl, and is the one who murdered all of the Pakoe victims after Shannon Davis.

Carson leaves to look for Charlie, while the detained Walt is allowed to call home. Walt's daughter Tanya informs him that Jenny, his stepdaughter, has left to explore the abandoned barn that Charlie was living in. Fearing for Jenny's safety, Walt escapes custody. Charlie reaches the barn (after killing several people, and wounding Carson) and corners Jenny, who is saved by Tanya. As the sisters flee Charlie, they accidentally shoot their father with Carson's gun, though as a last act Walt saves his daughters by setting Charlie on fire.

The next day, Carson and his men scour the lake that Charlie ran into, but the search is called off by the district attorney, who prematurely closes the case, content with stating that Walt was responsible for all of the murders. As the sheriff laments that it is not over, Charlie is shown picking up a female hitchhiker on the outskirts of town.

== Cast ==
- Chuck Whiting as Charlie Puckett
- Kerry Knight as Sheriff Carl Carson
- Joe Fishback as Walt Parker
- Aimee Tenalia as Jenny Parker
- Monica Simmons as Tanya Parker
- David Carr as Deputy Jack
- Al Arasim as Eddie
- Robin Krasny as Debbie Del Vecchio
- Dina Lynn Gross as Katie
- Jim O'Donnell as Bobby Snyder

== Release ==
The film was released on VHS in 1990. As of 2020, the film has not been released on DVD or Blu-ray.

=== Critical response ===
Justin Kerswell of Hysteria Lives! rated the film a score of two out of five, writing, "Sadly, despite some good cheesy touches it's overall a trifle dull (a cardinal sin for any slasher flick, I'm sure you'll agree). Not a really bad film by any means but, despite its rareness, ultimately it's not one that you really need to hunt down."

== Sequel ==
On January 27, 2017, the film's original writer, Bruce Carson announced that he would be directing a sequel to the film. As of 2026, no new updates have been given.
