= Ari Meyers =

American actress

- Born: San Juan, Puerto Rico
- Education: Yale University
- Occupation: Actress
- Years active: 1982–2006
- Known for: Kate & Allie

Ari Meyers is an American actress and nurse. She is known for playing the role of Emma Jane McArdle in the television series Kate & Allie (1984).

== Early years ==
Meyers was born in San Juan, Puerto Rico, to parents who were touring on the island. Her mother, actress Taro Meyers, appeared in the soap opera Another World. Meyers and her family moved to New York City where she was raised.

== Career ==
In 1982, Meyers starred with Al Pacino in the film Author! Author!. In 1983, she starred in the television series Kate & Allie. She continued to take advanced courses in school.

In 1988, Meyers left Kate & Allie and used her earnings to finish her studies at Yale University. From there, she graduated with honors and a double major in Philosophy and Theatre Arts.

After graduating, Meyers continued acting. Meyers has also voiced numerous audio books, such as:

- The Amy Fisher Story (1993)
- A Kitten's Tale (1995)
- The Wish (2000)

In 2003, Meyers appeared in the musical play Theophilus North (adopted from the 1973 novel) in New York City and in 2004 she participated in the play Little Willy after which she retired from acting. As of 2021, she is a postpartum nurse and lactation consultant at a hospital in Los Angeles, California.

== Filmography ==
Film
Year	Title	Role	Notes
1982	Author! Author!	Debbie	
1984	Vengeance Is Mine [aka Haunted]	Jackie	
1990	Shakma	Kim	
1990	Think Big	Holly Sherwood	
1991	Dutch	Brock	
1992	Dark Horse	Allison Mills	
1995	How to Make an American Quilt	Duff Darling	
2004	Looking for Kitty	Kitty Green Fiannico	

Television
Year	Title	Role	Notes
1983	Running Out	Jenny Corsini	TV movie
1984	License to Kill	Amy Peterson	TV movie
1984	American Playhouse	Jackie	Episode: "Haunted" (re-issued as Vengeance is Mine)
1984–1988	Kate & Allie	Emma McArdle	Series regular, 90 episodes
1985	Kids Don't Tell	Nicky Ryan	TV movie
1985	Picking Up the Pieces	Stacy Harding	TV movie
1988	Windmills of the Gods	Beth Ashley	TV mini series
1989	A Matter of Conscience	Lisa	ABC Afterschool Special
1990	Call Me Anna	Patty Duke, as a youth	TV movie
1991	Memories of Midnight	Atana	TV mini series
1992	In My Daughter's Name	Carly Elias	TV movie
1992–1993	Evening Shade	Aimee Thompson	2 episodes: "What a Night" (episode # 3.4, Oct. '92) "She What?!" (episode # 3.19, Mar. '93)
1993	River of Rage: The Taking of Maggie Keene	Nancy Hardgrave	TV movie (aka Murder on the Rio Grande)
1994	Confessions: Two Faces of Evil	Lisa Darby	TV movie
1995	Not Our Son	Ruth Keller	TV movie
1996	Home Song	Chelsea Gardner	TV movie
1996	Family Blessings	Janice Reston	TV movie (broadcast in 1999)
1996	Innocent Victims	Stacey Carolwood (uncredited)	TV movie (originally shown in two parts)
1997	The Killing Secret	Nicole Voss	TV movie (originally titled The Secret)
1997	Unwed Father	Gina	TV movie
2000	Diagnosis: Murder	Amy Saroyan	Episode: "Out of the Past: Part 1" (episode # 7.23)
2001–2003, 2007	Stanley	Mrs. Griff (Mom), various others	Series regular (cartoon), 17 episodes
2023	Rainn Wilson and the Geography of Bliss	Herself	Episode 5

Video games
Year	Title	Role	Notes
2001	Pro Skater 3	Various voices	Video game

== See also ==
- List of Puerto Ricans
- Jewish immigration to Puerto Rico
