= Shakma =

- Theatrical film poster
- Directed by: Hugh Parks; Tom Logan
- Written by: John Sayles
- Screenplay by: Roger Engle
- Produced by: Hugh Parks
- Starring: Christopher Atkins; Amanda Wyss; Ari Meyers; Roddy McDowall
- Cinematography: Andrew Bieber
- Edited by: Mike Palma
- Music by: David C. Williams
- Distributed by: Castle Hill Productions; Quest Entertainment
- Release date: October 5, 1990 (United States)
- Running time: 101 minutes
- Country: United States
- Language: English
- Budget: $1,500,000 (estimated)
- Box office: Unknown

Shakma is a 1990 American natural horror film directed by Tom Logan and Hugh Parks. It stars Christopher Atkins, Amanda Wyss, Ari Meyers and Roddy McDowall battling a baboon that has been driven insane by an experimental drug. Despite all the negative reviews, the film has achieved a small cult audience.

== Plot ==
Shakma, a hamadryas baboon belonging to medical student Sam, is injected by Sam's professor Sorensen with an experimental variation of corticotropin intended to inhibit aggression. When Shakma awakes and goes berserk, Sorensen instructs Sam to euthanize him, but Sam cannot bring himself to carry out the order and leaves Shakma unconscious. Before fellow student Richard can cremate Shakma, Sorensen insists on performing a necropsy the following day, and Shakma is left alive. That night, Sorensen organizes a live-action role-playing game for Sam and his colleagues Gary, Bradley, Richard and Tracy. The objective of the game is to reach Richard's younger sister Kim on the top floor. The players are issued walkie-talkies, which allow communication with only Sorensen, the gamemaster. As part of the game's preparation, Sorensen disables the fire alarm system and locks the offices and building to disallow any player from leaving until the end of the game. Shakma, who has since regained consciousness, kills Bradley when he ventures into the specimen room on the fifth floor. Richard is also killed while investigating Bradley's whereabouts on Sorensen's instruction.

Sorensen investigates the players' disappearances personally and finds Richard's mutilated body before falling prey to Shakma himself. The sounds of Shakma's carnage alerts Sam and Tracy to his presence, but they are unable to use the elevator as Sorensen's body is jamming the door. Sam takes the stairs to the fifth floor and unsuccessfully attempts to tame Shakma before fleeing the floor along with Tracy. Tracy goes to the electricity lab to collect a strobe light that she uses to temporarily blind Shakma, and she holds the specimen room door shut while Sam goes to locate and remove Sorensen's body from the elevator. When Tracy confirms Richard's presence in the specimen room, she distracts Shakma while Sam goes to recover Richard, but Shakma returns before he is able to recover from the shock of discovering his body, and Sam and Tracy narrowly escape Shakma's pursuit once more. As Sam and Tracy begin a search for Gary and Bradley, Gary is killed while using the elevator, which allows Shakma onto the sixth floor. Tracy is killed in the floor's restroom shortly after.

Sam goes to the top floor to warn Kim (without letting her know of Richard's death), arms himself with a kitchen knife and continues his search for the others while Kim stays to attract the attention of Richard's girlfriend Laura, whose car is parked below. As Sam finds Gary's and Tracy's bodies as well as Sorensen's keys, Laura drives away, and Kim decides to go find Richard herself after leaving a hand-written note for Sam; she is killed by Shakma after finding Richard's body. Sam, after finding Bradley's and Kim's bodies, prepares to alert the police from Sorensen's office, but his grief over Tracy's death, in particular, drives him to kill Shakma himself. He sets up a trap to electrocute Shakma, who avoids the trap and mortally injures Sam. Shakma is ultimately burned to death when Sam manages to lure him into the incinerator. Sam collapses in a hallway and declares "I win," to a nearby monkey doll, before "peacefully" dying.

== Cast ==
- Christopher Atkins as Sam
- Amanda Wyss as Tracy
- Ari Meyers as Kim
- Roddy McDowall as Professor Sorensen
- Robb Edward Morris (credited as Robb Morris) as Gary
- Tre Laughlin as Bradley
- Greg Flowers as Richard
- Ann Kymberlie as Laura
- Donna Jarrett as Brenda
- Typhoon (uncredited animal) as Shakma
- John Sayles as Cop

== Production ==
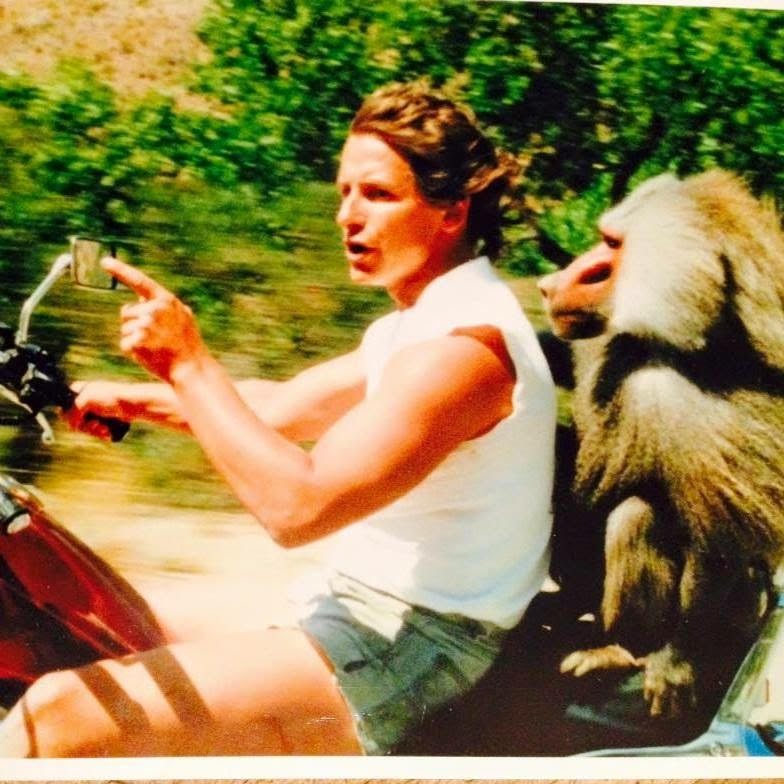
Shakma is portrayed by Typhoon, pictured here with his trainer Gerry Therrien

The monkey playing Shakma is called Typhoon and was handled by Gerry Therrien of Action Animals. Although the title might be read to indicate it is a chacma baboon, Typhoon was actually a hamadryas baboon. Actress Amanda Wyss was terrified of the animal.

In an interview, actor Christopher Atkins said that production was "intensive" and that actors had to be careful when making eye-contact with the baboon as it could become aggressive. Atkins also claimed that women who were on their period were not allowed to go near the baboon, as it would "go crazy" if they did. Furthermore, Atkins claimed that the baboon would try to attack the trainer's assistant Steve Martin because it believed it was higher in the pecking order than him. This aggressive relationship led to the baboon dislocating its shoulder during production. Atkins also states that the baboon's aggression led to its penis becoming erect, which he claims had to be "air-brushed" out of the film.

During production, as many scenes as possible were filmed without the actors interacting with the baboon due to safety concerns. Instead an animatronic or puppet baboon was used in some shots including one where a puppet of Typhoon was thrown through a glass window.

Filming took place at Universal Studios Florida. Atkins became involved in the film because he was friends with Jim Parks, a producer at the newly opened studio. Filming had to stop around 3 o'clock on most days due to thunderstorms near the studio.

== Release ==
Shakma had a limited theatrical run before being released on VHS in 1990. It would get a barebones budget DVD release on October 16, 2007, and a more substantial Blu-ray version from Screen Archives Entertainment under its Code Red label in 2013. This edition features an interview with director Tom Logan, commentary by Logan and David Decoteau, and host segments by Katarina Waters. It was only released in a limited 3000-copy print run. A DVD with the same features came out on October 13, 2015.

In April 2015, Shakma was made available on streaming video from Shout! Factory. It is also available on Amazon Video and was once on Netflix.

A new HD master of Shakma was released by Code Red DVD on Blu-ray in a limited edition of 3000.

== Reception ==
Critical reception for Shakma was highly negative upon its release, with many panning the film's weak humor, shoddy effects, and flat direction. Eric Snyder of MTV criticized the film's extended dull stretches, weak characters, soundtrack, and poorly executed attack sequences. Kurt Dahlke from DVD Talk panned the film, awarding it 1.5 out of a possible 5 stars, writing, "While it might sound delightfully bad, Shakma's tale of a murderous monkey knocking off role-playing med-students pisses on the line between so-bad-it's-good and downright insulting with willful disobedience. It's not funny, scary, or much of anything more than bewildering and tiresome." Maitland McDonagh from TV Guide gave the film 1 out of 5 stars, stating that the film "veers between the creepy and the profoundly silly", also noting that the role-playing aspect was "painfully dated". Katie Rife of The A.V. Club called the film "standard" and criticized the film's "laughable" dialogue, role-playing sub-plot, and acting.

Dread Central rated the film a score of 2.5 out of 5, stating that the film's camp value was its primary source of entertainment. The film was listed on IFC's "The 25 best Animal Attacks in Movie History", stating that the film was "Pretty stupid as these things go, but at least it gives it the old college try".

Regardless, the film has gained a small cult following over the years, including praise from filmmaker David Lynch who stated in an interview with Empire magazine that Shakma was his favourite film of 1990.
