= Tom Logan (director) =

American film director

- Born: Tom Logan; September 7, 1953 (age 72); Shreveport, Louisiana, U.S.
- Education: California State University, Northridge (BA)
- Occupations: Film and television director, actor, writer, acting instructor

Tom Logan (born 1953) is an American director, writer, producer, acting instructor, and former actor. Based in Los Angeles, he has directed a multitude of feature films and television shows, and directed hundreds national and international commercials.

== Early life ==
Logan was born in Shreveport, Louisiana and attended the University of Arkansas for two years before earning a Bachelor of Arts degree in Theatre Arts from California State University, Northridge.

== Career ==
One of his first assignments was directing/writing/producing many episodes of Real Stories of the Highway Patrol.

His feature film directing credits include Shakma, Dream Trap, The Night Brings Charlie, King's Ransom and Escape from Cuba.

Logan has also held acting roles in General Hospital, playing Gary on-and-off for 13 years. He also starred in Days of Our Lives and other soap operas.

=== Acting ===
In the eighties and nineties Logan appeared on dozens of TV shows including CHiPs, What's Happening!, The Hardy Boys, and James at 16. He has also starred in TV movies and commercials.

Logan also starred in many feature films and over 70 stage productions. In New York he starred in You're A Good Man, Charlie Brown, Mame, and Applause.

=== Other work ===
Prior to his acting career, Logan was an acting coach.

Logan headed the TV/Film & Commercial acting departments in Los Angeles at the American Film Institute (1981–88), and the American Academy of Dramatic Arts, West (1980–87).

Logan has written four books about acting: How to Act and Eat at the Same Time, Acting in the Million Dollar Minute and their respective sequels.

Logan is also an aviation enthusiast and owner of a Piper Arrow.

Logan also dedicates time helping young people who are interested in the entertainment industry. He is a collaborator with the Los Angeles-based Young Performers Studio.

== Accolades ==
- 1986 – Bronze Halo Award "Outstanding Contributions to the Entertainment Industry" For authoring his three (now 4) best-selling books for actors. Given annually by the Southern California Motion Picture Council. http://www.tomlogan.com/Director.htm
- 1995 – Producers' Choice Award "Outstanding Direction of a Television Variety Program", 1995 Miss North America Pageant. http://www.tomlogan.com/Director.htm
- 1999 – Best Director "Outstanding Achievement in Direction", Escape From Cuba New Star Discovery Awards. http://www.tomlogan.com/Director.htm Logan is a member of the Directors Guild of America, the Screen Actors Guild, American Federation of Television and Radio Artists, and Actors' Equity Association.

== Bibliography ==
- Logan, Tom (2004), How to Act & Eat at the Same Time: The Sequel : The Do's and Don'ts of Landing A Professional Acting Job, Limelight Editions, ISBN 978-0-87910-991-2
- Logan, Tom (2005), Acting in the Million Dollar Minute: The Sequel, Limelight Editions, ISBN 978-0-87910-307-1
