= Jimmy Lifton =

American musician and film producer

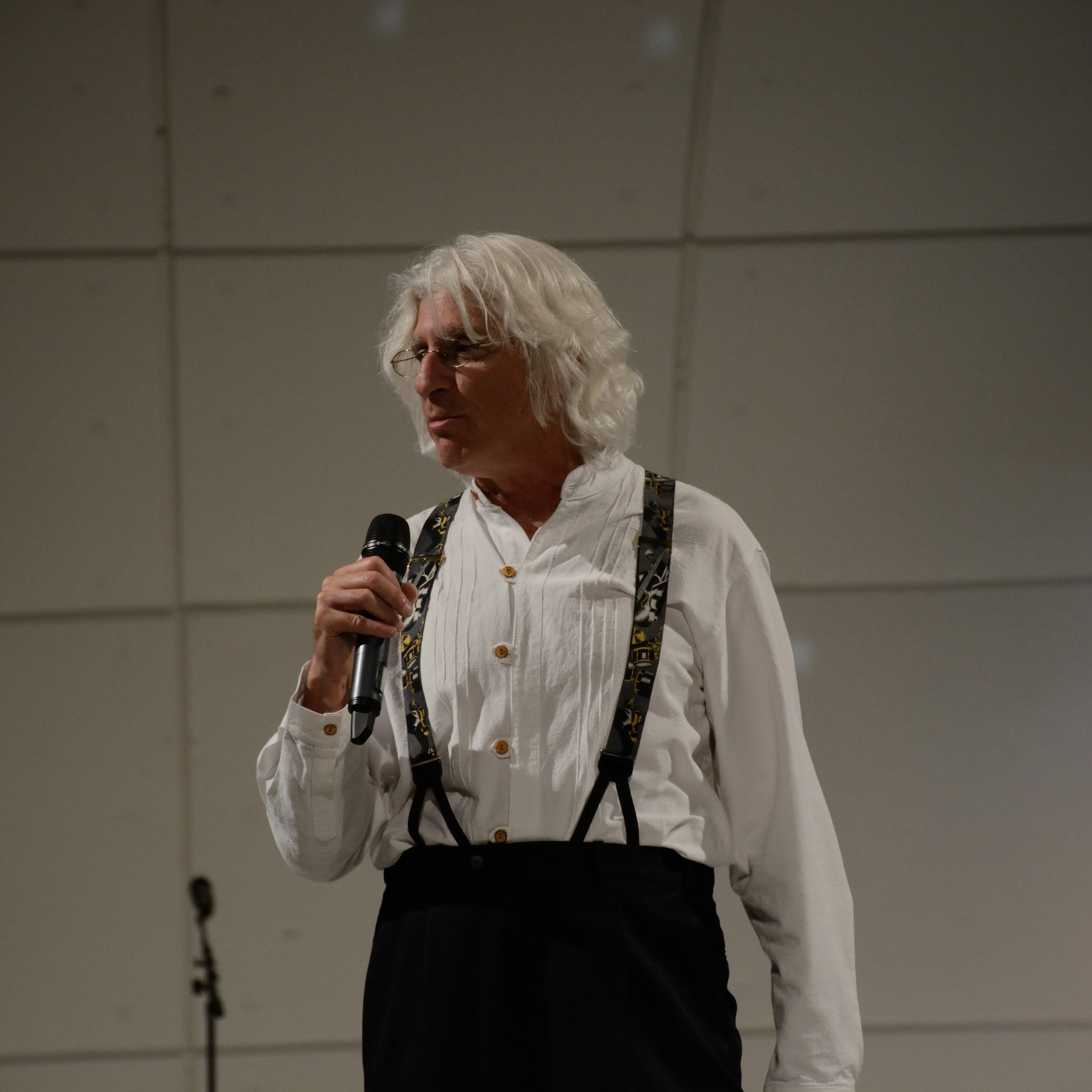
- Lifton honoring veterans at the Lifton Institute of Media Arts & Sciences Vet 50 Gala
- Born: January 13, 1955 (age 71); Detroit, Michigan, U.S.
- Occupations: Musician, producer
- Years active: 1978–present
- Spouse: Paulette Victor-Lifton (m. 1997; div. 2016)

James Ian Lifton (born January 13, 1955), also known as Jimmy Lifton, is an American musician and film producer. Lifton's first major film production was the horror cult classic Mirror, Mirror (1990). Since then, he has produced 18 feature films, working with actors like Mark Ruffalo, Christina Ricci, Hulk Hogan, James Brolin, Traci Lords, and Bruce Campbell. Lifton co-founded a post-production company called Oracle Post in 1996. Oracle Post provides picture and sound needs for feature films and television, and has a client base that consists of companies like Fox, HBO, NBC, Universal, Disney, Nickelodeon, Paramount, Sony, Warner Brothers, and MTV.

== Early life ==
Lifton was born in Detroit, Michigan. He got an early start to his creative career, and at a young age he was graced with an apprenticeship to the Master Organist for the Detroit Symphony. In 1972, Lifton started his first band, Merlin. Merlin's most notable performances were at the People's Ballroom, in Ann Arbor, where they opened for vocalist Mitch Ryder and The Knock Down Party Band, and Bob Seger. Lifton attend The Royal Conservatory of Music and earned a degree in piano. After graduation, Lifton moved to Boston to attend Berklee School of Music. Soon he decided he had learned all that he could and moved back to Michigan to pursue a career in the music industry.

== Career ==
=== Music ===
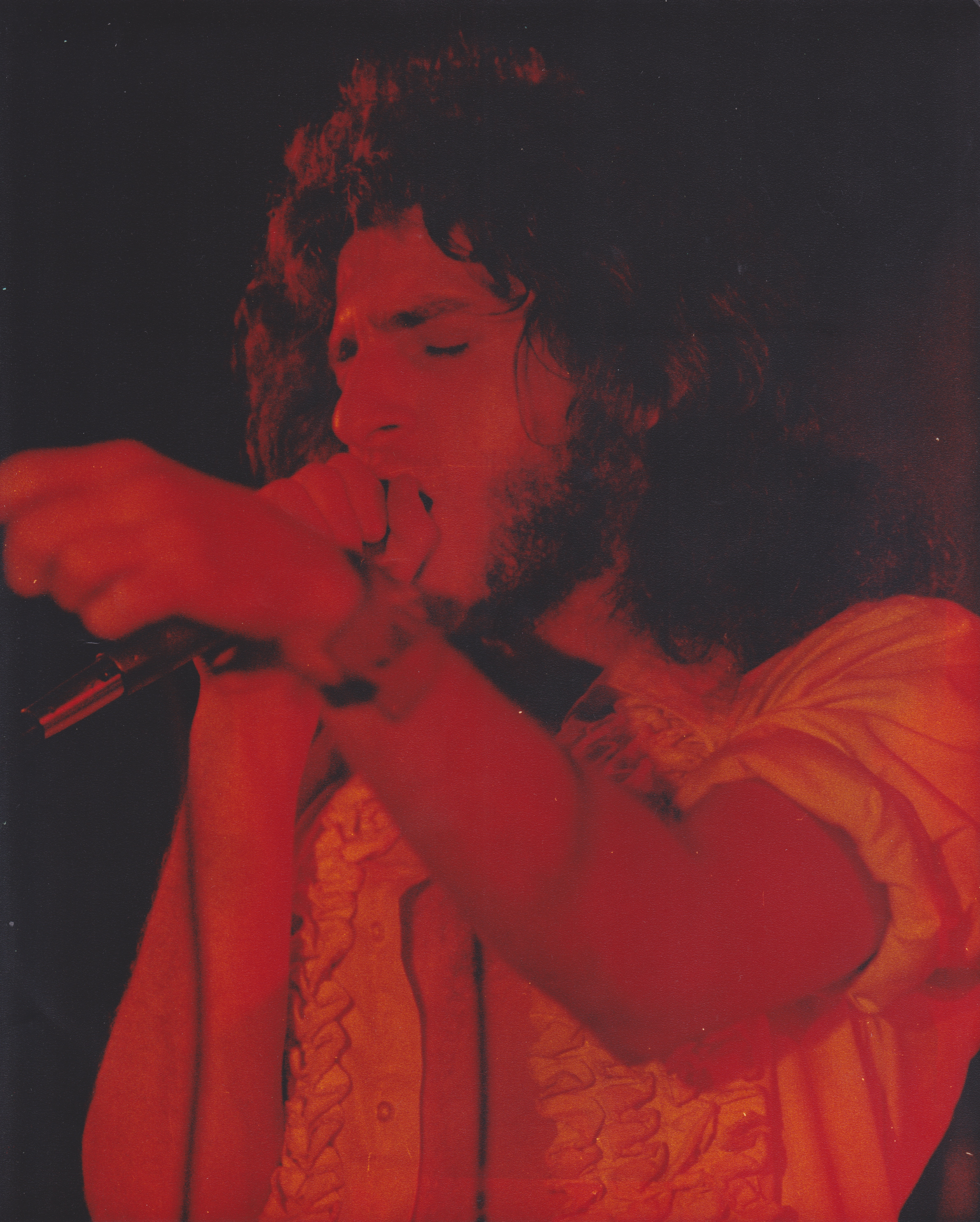
Lifton performing live circa 1980

Lifton started off his professional musical career at age 21, working as a studio session player for Detroit-based studios, most notably Don Davis's famed Motown recording studio Groovesville Productions and Lorio Recording Studio. Lifton co-founded his own record label, Orphan Records, with Virginia Perfili in 1981, and released his first single, "I Want to Talk to You", in 1982. Lifton released his first EP, Untitled, in 1984. The EP consisted of songs "I Wanna Talk to You", "Of Mystics", "Soldier", "Silence", "Harmony", and "Time We Were on Our Way".

In 1986, Lifton collaborated with Jimmy Miller and Steve Winwood to create a cover for their hit song "I'm a Man". The music video featured live performance footage as well as dancers like August 1986 Playboy playmate Ava Fabian. The video was directed by David Golden, produced by Marina Sargenti, with John LeBlanc serving as cinematographer. Lifton self promoted the video, driving the song to #23 on the Billboard charts, which generated enough attention for Atlantic Records to take notice, leading them to buy the license and sign Lifton to a record deal.

Lifton enjoyed the process of making videos and started exploring the relatively new world of music videos. Lifton worked extensively with Bruce Nazarian; together, they produced many 12" records that appeared on Orphan Records. Through his relationship with Bruce Nazarian, Lifton was hired in 1986 by Island Records to direct Millie Scott's music video for her song "Automatic". By involving himself with making music videos, Lifton became more and more interested in the art of filmmaking. By 1987, Lifton got his foot in the door of the film industry by working on the soundtrack of the feature film Kandyland.

=== Filmmaking ===
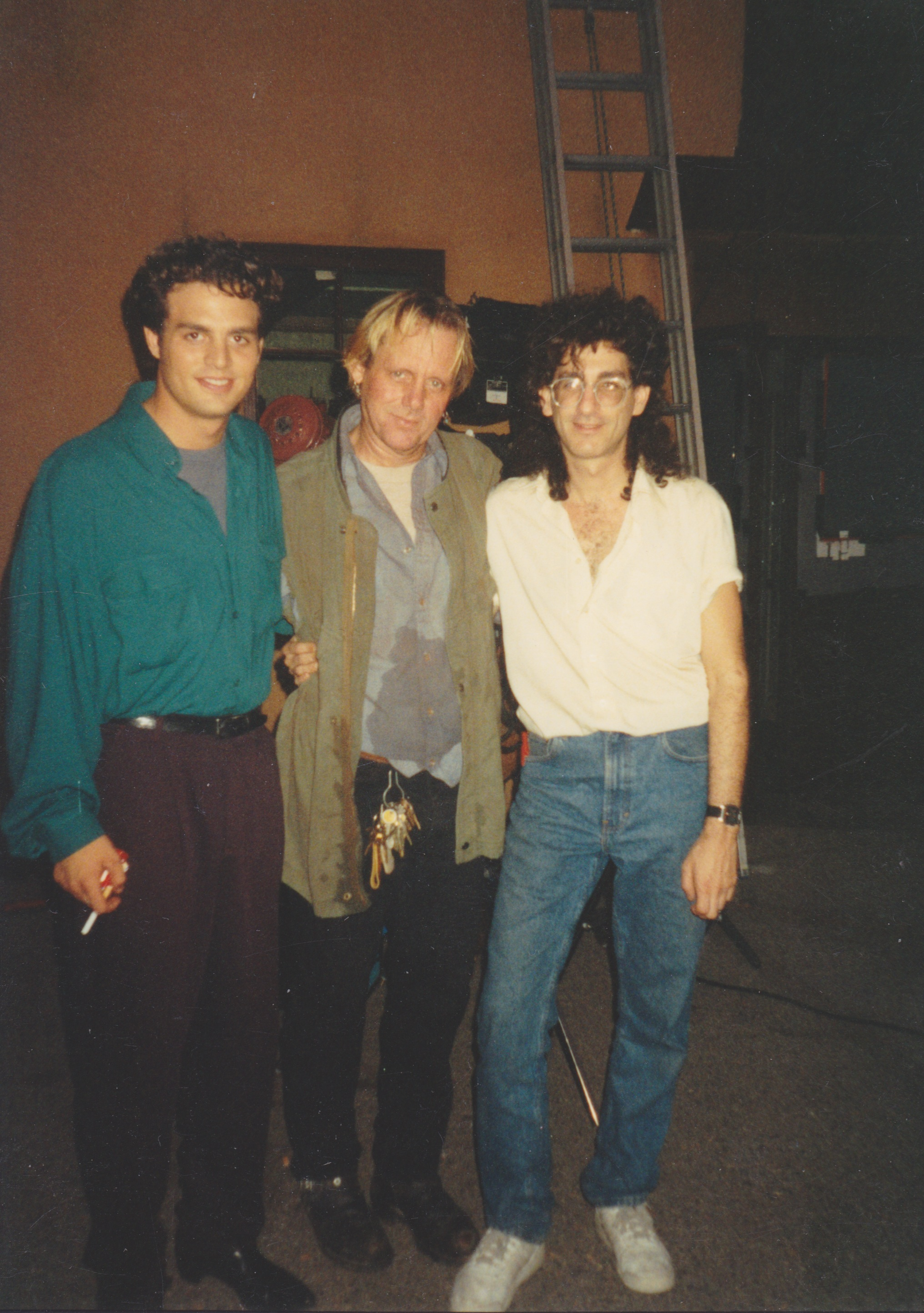
Lifton with Mark Ruffalo on the set of Mirror, Mirror 2: Raven Dance

In 1990, Lifton released his first feature-length film, Mirror, Mirror, starring Karen Black, Yvonne De Carlo, and William Sanderson. The film was directed by Marina Sargenti. Lifton produced the film, composed the music, and worked on the mechanical effects. The 1994 sequel, Mirror, Mirror 2: Raven Dance, starring Mark Ruffalo, Sally Kellerman, and Roddy McDowall, was the first film Lifton directed and co-wrote.

He co-founded Oracle Post with Paulette Victor-Lifton in 1996. From 1996 until the late 2000s, Lifton contributed to many film and TV productions, most notably Blade: The Series, SpongeBob SquarePants, The Penguins of Madagascar, and Kung Fu Panda: Legends of Awesomeness. Oracle post was used as the ADR facility for film productions Righteous Kill (2008), Saw V, and Superman Returns (2006), and TV shows Curb Your Enthusiasm (1999–2004), NCIS (2005–2006), Punk'd (2005–2006), and The X's (2005–2006).

Lifton won multiple Golden Reel Awards and was nominated for multiple Daytime Emmy Awards for his work on SpongeBob SquarePants. Lifton won a Daytime Emmy as well as multiple Golden Reel Awards for his work on The Penguins of Madagascar (2008). In 2012, Lifton won a Daytime Emmy Award for his work on Kung Fu Panda: Legends of Awesomeness (2011).

Lifton's Triad Studios released three films in 1995, starting with Final Equinox, which was written and directed by Serge Rodnunsky and starred Joe Lara and David Warner. Next came sci-fi thriller Phoenix, which Lifton co-wrote with Troy Cook. Troy directed the film, and Stephen Nichols, Brad Dourif, and Billy Drago starred in it. After the two films, Lifton closed down the studio and finished the year with the release of Mirror, Mirror 3: The Voyeur. The film was directed by Rachel Gordon and Virginia Perfili, and was written by Steve Tymon, Mark Ruffalo, Billy Drago, David Naughton. Monique Parent starred in the film.

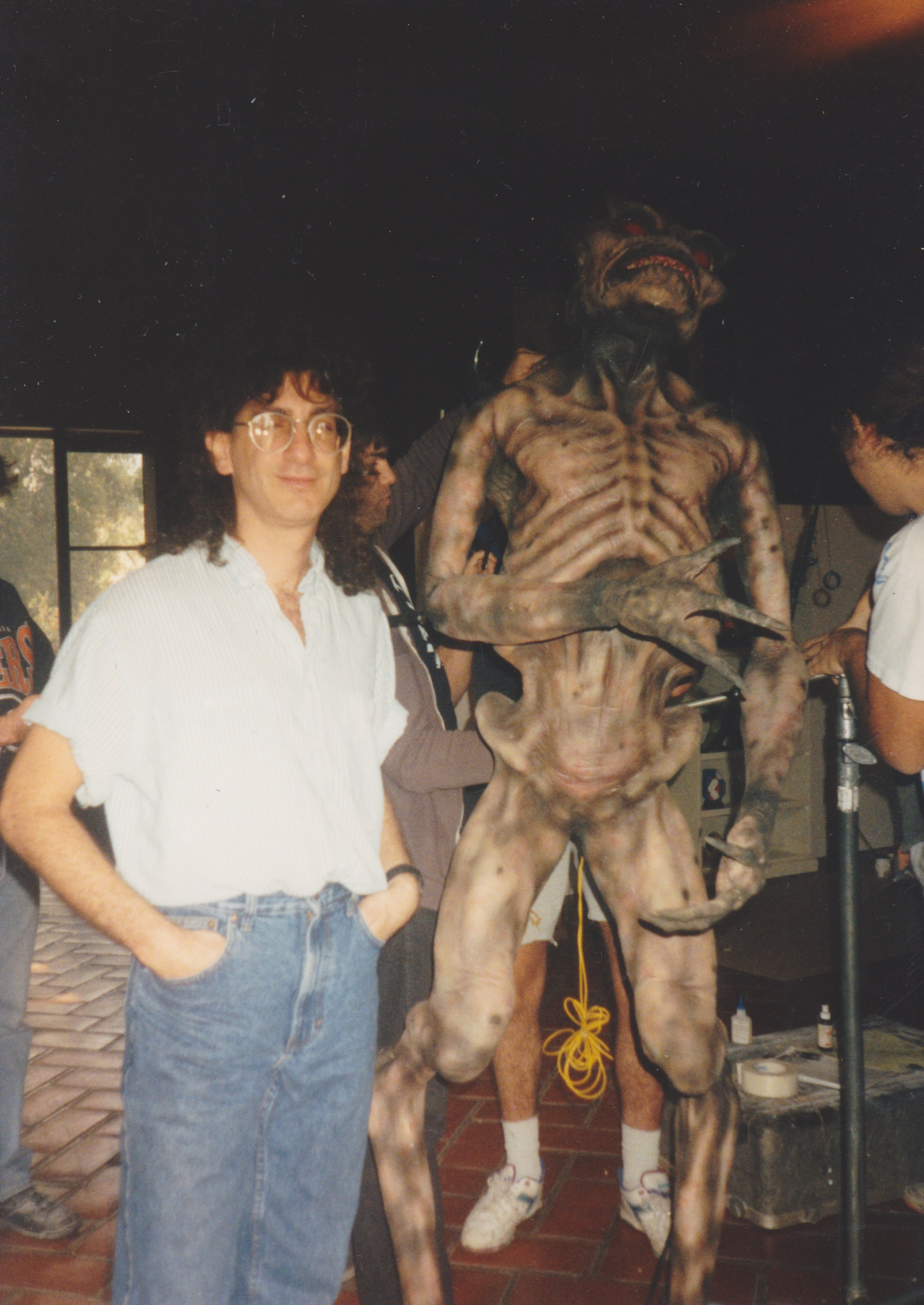
Lifton on set with a monster circa 1994

In 1996, Lifton produced another three features. The Secret Agent Club, was written by Rory Johnston and directed by John Murlowski. The film starred Hulk Hogan, Barry Bostwick, and Lesley-Anne Down. Blood Money, directed by John Shepphird, starred James Brolin, Billy Drago, Dean Tarrolly, and Traci Lords. Lifton ended the year with Assault on Dome 4, a made-for-TV movie starring Bruce Campbell, Joseph Culp, and Jocelyn Seagrave.

In 1997, Lifton produced two feature films. Firestorm, co-directed by John Shepphird and Steve Jankowski, was written by Jimmy Lifton, Nick Spagnoli, and Paulette Victor-Lifton. John Savage, Bentley Mitchum, Sherrie Rose, and Joseph Culp starred in the film. The second film was a children's comedy titled Little Cobras: Operation Dalmatian.

In 1998, Lifton produced two feature films. The first was a film titled Mixed Blessings, which was directed by Nadine Bass and written by Mary Hardcastle and Shelley Morhaim. The film starred Timothy Bottoms, Rustam Branaman, Tom Bresnahan, and Kelly Curtis. The second film was a fun family film about a chimpanzee titled Monkey Business. The film was directed by Paulette Victor-Lifton and was written by Ted Fox, Jimmy Lifton, and Paulette Victor-Lifton. The film starred Shia LaBeouf, Brenden Jefferson, Kevin Cabriales, and Kathren Laurents. LaBeouf was awarded his SAG card because of his role in the film.

In 2000, Lifton released his final film before taking a nearly 10-year hiatus from producing films to focus on growing Oracle Post. His final film before the break was the last of the Mirror, Mirror series of films titled Mirror, Mirror 4: Reflection. The film was directed by Paulette Victor-Lifton and was co-written by Annette Cascone, Gina Cascone, and Paulette Victor-Lifton.

=== Other work ===
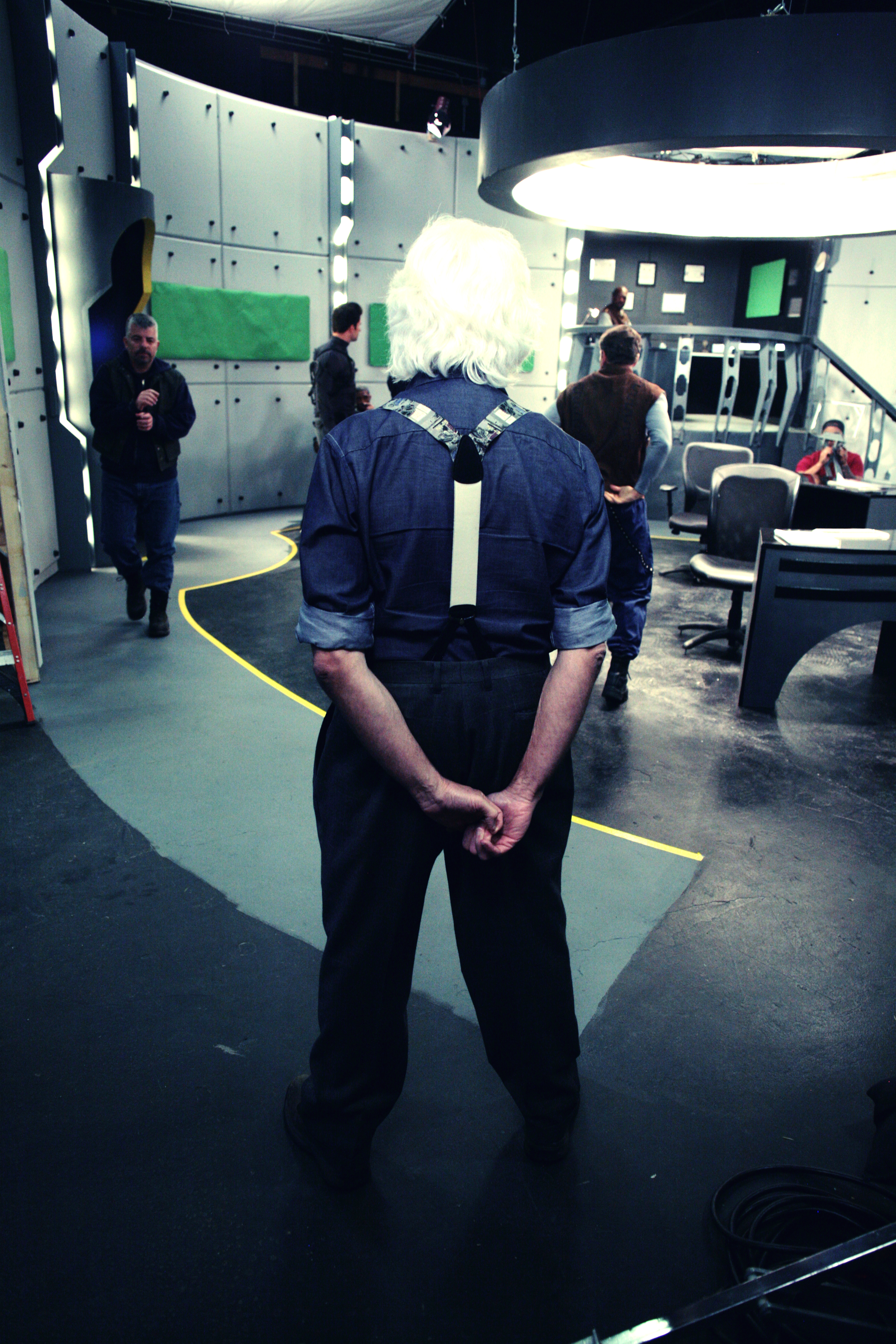
Lifton on the set of LIMS production Time Piece

Lifton founded Unity Studios and the Lifton Institute of Media Skills between 2009 and 2010 in an effort to train out-of-work skilled laborers in the Detroit area for the movie and TV industry. More than half of the Lifton Institute's inaugural class, which began in October 2009, reported finding work on at least one film, TV or music video production within 90 days of their graduation. Unity Studios and The Lifton Institute closed its doors in 2010 when Gov. Rick Snyder was elected and put harsh restrictions on the Michigan film incentive project.

In 2015, Lifton opened the Lifton Institute of Media Arts and Sciences in California's Santa Clarita Valley. The focus of the school is to train crews for film, TV, and music productions. In 2016, LIMS launched its VET 50 program where 50 homeless veterans were provided with free training and assistance, transportation, food, and help with housing while in the LIMS program. The veterans were also given hands on assistance with job placement post graduation. The VET 50 program has since expanded and a new program called VET 200 was created to provide free training for 9-11 veterans.

== Legal ==
Unity Studios began as a public-private partnership, consisting of Lifton and a private real estate developer. The plan, announced in April 2009, called for Allen Park to use bond proceeds to buy land it would donate to the PPP. The private developer would then commit to begin construction on the 104-acre site, while Lifton managed the project and rounded up additional investors. The plan started unraveling the next month, however, when Allen Park faced a deficit in its fiscal budget for 2010. Lifton offered to cover the deficit — with the money being a "capital repayment", but shortly thereafter, Lifton was informed that the city was unable to work within a PPP framework and the contract signed would be null and void. This effectively collapsed the PPP, as the city no longer met requirements for its membership.

By August 2009, Lifton's plans were reduced to having him become a tenant instead of the property owner and lease a mere 100,000 square feet on the site to run the Lifton Institute for Media Skills. According to the SEC, none of these changes appeared in November 2009 documents provided by Allen Park's mayoral staff aimed at Allen Park selling bonds. Two former civic leaders of Allen Park, Michigan, former Mayor Gary Burtka and former City Administrator Eric Waidelich, were levied with civil fraud charges by the SEC. The two — the first municipal officers ever hit with such charges — led a muni bond offering that gave investors incorrect information that misstated the city's financial condition. The SEC announced the fraud charges as it settled the suit against former Mayor Gary Burtka and former City Administrator Eric Waidelich.

In 2010, Lifton and a financial partner Emerald Entertainment purchased a 100,000 sq ft building in Detroit's historic Piquette area. This former auto factory facility was to be the cornerstone of the feature film development project for the downtown Detroit area. The building remained in escrow awaiting a new Governor, Rick Snyder's, stance on the Michigan Film incentive.

Governor Rick Snyder, who was elected in 2010, instituted new legislature eliminating the existing Michigan film incentive. Lifton and Emerald terminated their escrow and closed the school.

== See also ==
- List of horror films of 1994
- List of awards and nominations received by SpongeBob SquarePants
- 38th Daytime Emmy Awards
- 39th Daytime Creative Arts Emmy Awards
