= Graveyard School (novella series) =

Children's book series

Graveyard School is a series of children's horror fiction novellas created and authored by Tom B. Stone (pseudonym of author Nola Thacker). The series contained twenty-eight books which were published by Bantam Books from 1994 to 1998.

== Overview ==
The series takes place in the fictional town of Grove Hill, although sometimes the books take place at a secluded summer camp or, in one book, on an island. The main characters are usually preteen boys and girls who experience supernatural phenomenon which are often mentioned in other books but are never fully referenced. The characters have a hard time explaining it to the adults and teenagers around them who never take them seriously, save for a few. Some of the main characters of one book are usually seen in other ones although they are merely background characters most of the time.

Grove Hill Elementary School gained the nickname Graveyard School due to Graveyard Hill, the abandoned graveyard right next door to it. The school is run by Dr. Morthouse, who has gained infamy from the students due to her cold, cruel, and frightening personality, along with the possibility that she has a silver fang in her mouth which they often catch a glimpse of. She is aware of the events that happen in her school and is, apparently, part of it. The vice-principal, Mr. Hannibal Lucre, is overly sweet to the students, and is known for the damp, squishy noise his sweaty hands make when he rubs them together. Amongst the most feared of the faculty is the janitor, Mr. Bartholomew, nicknamed Basement Bart, because he spends practically all his time in the school basement which spreads for miles, and can always be seen dressed in army attire. Even though no one actually sees him in the halls, he pops up from time to time whenever someone causes a mess or is about to get into a fight.

Another section of Grove Hill is Slime Lake, a lake out near the woods known for the green color of the water caused by the mysterious slime that can be found in it. Living inside the Lake is a lake monster nicknamed Emmie, whose existence is known only by a few people in order to protect her.

The kinds of threats the kids usually deal with are ghosts, vampires, and mummies, along with one-of-a-kind creatures such as a demonic Easter bunny, a haunted school bus, resurrected dinosaurs, wish-granting spiders, a skateboarding Skeleton, and other such monsters.

Each book usually contains puns and references to other books, and each contain an activity at the end such as crosswords, ad-libs, and science experiments.

== List of books ==
1. Don't Eat the Mystery Meat!: It is a new school year at Grove Hill Elementary, but the kids are not exactly thrilled about it. The same can be said for the weird new lunchroom cook and her weird mystery meat dishes. Meanwhile, there is an alarming number of missing pets around Grove Hill.
2. The Skeleton on the Skateboard: Skate is determined to be the best skateboarder in Grove Hill, but the skeleton riding down Graveyard Hill might have something to say about that.
3. The Headless Bicycle Rider: Algie Green is new to Grove Hill, and just his luck that he gets stuck with a paper route to creepy Mr. Bates's derelict home. The legend of a headless bicycle rider in the area does not make it any easier.
4. Little Pet Werewolf: After last year's abysmal Pet Day, Skip has sworn to bring in a cool new pet instead of his lame dog, Lupe. He is going to bring in a werewolf, but of course, he is not going to have to look far.
5. Revenge of the Dinosaurs: David Pike's little brother is a dinosaur fanatic who has finally gone off his nut when he claims his new action figures have grown very big and real.
6. Camp Dracula: A summer away from Graveyard School should be relaxing for Jeep, but Camp Westera is starting to become a real pain in the neck, so to speak.
7. Slime Lake: Everyone knows about the weird green slime growing in Slime Lake, but twins Marc and Terri have a mystery set before them when the new recreation center is being brought down by a monstrous source of trouble.
8. Let's Scare the Teacher to Death!: Bentley loves scaring everyone with his practical jokes, especially his teachers. When a new teacher starts at his school, he immediately sets out to make her his newest victim, but he might have gone too far.
9. The Abominable Snow Monster: Kyle sets out to build the coolest and scariest snow monster in Grove Hill after a record thirteen snowstorms hit, but it seems he made one a little too big, too frightening, and too alive.
10. There's a Ghost in the Boys' Bathroom: School bathrooms have never been gross or scary before, but it is up to Alex to figure just who, or what is haunting the boys' bathroom at Graveyard Hill.
11. April Ghouls' Day: Personalities switch after a trip in the hallway has Principal Morthouse holding faculty pizza parties and Maria Medina giving off terrifying stares.
12. Scream, Team!: The Grove Hill sixth grade soccer team is fighting for their lives when the huge, monstrous team from Belville Academy comes lumbering down the field.
13. Tales Too Scary to Tell at Camp: Thirteen scary stories told around the campfire of giant lice, jogging skeletons, and misplaced twins as a group of kids fight to survive their night with an evil host.
14. The Tragic School Bus: Skip does not like his new house, and he does not like his new bus, but compared to the bus coming up the road with all those dead kids he reconsiders his choices.
15. The Fright Before Christmas: Christopher would redefine the word "Scrooge" if he could. He hates Christmas and Santa Claus, and he is not particularly fond of ghosts while he is at it.
16. Don't Tell Mummy: A trip to the museum did not seem so boring when Park got buddied with a weird fifth-grade girl, but his boredom is now a terror when he realizes that someone is out to kill him.
17. Jack and the Beanstalker: Jackson needs money or he is a dead man. The only thing mowing lawns got him was a handful of magic beans. He goes to find some money at the top of that giant beanstalk growing out of his yard.
18. The Dead Sox: It is summertime at Grove Hill and the All-Stars are ready for the summer league, bur Park is going to have to play a hundred and ten percent if he wants to save Algie's soul from a mysterious new coach.
19. The Gator Ate Her: Algie would give anything rather than spend the summer with his weird relatives in the swamp, which happens to be the home of something big and green with glowing eyes and lots of teeth.
20. Creature Teacher: Bentley has sworn off jokes after the last time, but he may change his tone when a nice new substitute teacher suddenly gets a personality overhaul overnight.
21. The Skeleton's Revenge: Skate is spending his Thanksgiving vacation on his uncle's private island in Florida, but no matter how far he goes, the skeleton on the skateboard is not far behind.
22. Boo Year's Eve: Jordie has the bad luck to get invited to Polly Hannah's boring New Year's Eve party, but a stopover at a weird mansion will make her change her mind.
23. The Easter Egg Haunt: The annual Easter Egg hunt at Grove Hill has got David's brother all hyped up, but the weird egg he finds is beginning to creep David out, with its horrible smell.
24. Scream Around the Campfire: Alex gets sent to Camp Nevermore for the summer, and if having a weird bunkmate was not bad enough, it seems the disturbing campfire stories are starting to come true.
25. Escape from Vampire Park: Nathan has got a cool summer job working at Vampire Park, the carnival that has arrived in town. He gets to ride all the rides he wants, including the Tunnel of Blood.
26. Little School of Horrors: Blue is the new kid at Graveyard Hill, and feels like a fish out of water among his classmates who breathe fire, grow fangs, and have snakes for hair.
27. Here Comes Santa Claws: Kyle is content to make his weird aunt Mab and her evil cat miserable for ruining his Christmas, but he soon runs into trouble when he is visited by a clawed maniac in a Santa suit.
28. The Spider Beside Her: Mel gets stuck with Ari, the resident spider enthusiast, in detention. He soon learns that she loves spiders so much she would do anything for them, and vice versa.

== Characters ==
=== Grove Hill Elementary School students ===
Park Addams
Parker, or Park as he is called, is one of the most frequently used characters in the series. Known for his baseball cap, he is an avid baseball fan and was on the Grove Hill All-Stars junior baseball team.
Jaws Bennett
Jaws, real name Alexander, claims he can eat practically anything, "even roadkill". He is the only student at Grove Hill who enjoys eating the disgusting school lunches the cafeteria makes.
Kirstin Bjorg
Kirstin is class president of the sixth grade and is friends with Algie Green, but she does have a secret no one at school could ever suspect.
Roy Carne
Roy is Eddie Hoover's right-hand man.
Stacey Carter
Stacey is a dog-lover who makes money walking dogs. She is Maria Medina's best friend and keeps a bulldog named Morris as a pet.
Kyle Chilton
Jackson Crowder
Ken Dahl
Ken is school bully Jason Dunnbar's right-hand man and is quite literally a dunce.
Jason Dunnbar
Jason is the school bully and is enemies with Kirstin Bjorg and Algie Green. He was once the only student nominated for class president, until Algie nominated Kirstin and helped her win.
Nathan Ebro
Jordie Flanders
Jordie is sometimes called the "Human Computer" by her classmates because she is the smartest in school. She has a hard time accepting that something supernatural can happen and always tries to find a logical explanation, until it is too late.
Marc Foster
Marc is the twin brother of Terri, and although the two look alike, Mark has a more serious attitude.
Terri Foster
Terri is Marc's twin sister, and when compared to him, she is much more carefree and has a generally sweet personality.
Algernon Green
Algie was originally the new kid at Grove Hill Elementary. Known for his glasses and his short ponytail, Algie makes money on a paper route and has been on both the school's soccer team and the town's little league team.
Christopher Hampton
Christopher is a well-known miser among his fellow students and used to have a personality similar only to Ebeneezer Scrooge, until one certain Christmas.
Polly Hannah
Polly is well-hated among the children of Grove Hill for being a suck up and a teacher's pet, and she knows it. Despite this, Polly never seems to care what the other students think of her, and practically always gets her way. She can be identified by her clothes, which are usually pink, pale blue, and butter yellow.
Jeep Holmes
Eddie Hoover
Eddie is rivals with Skate McGraw for the title of best skater, until they had a near-death experience and Eddie switched to board games.
Bentley Jest
Bent is the school's reigning prank master, and is known to wage all-out war on his teachers. He stopped for a while though, when one of his pranks seemed to have actually scared a teacher to death.
Alex Lee
Skate McGraw
Skate, real name Ryan, is a skateboard enthusiast, as is his cousin Vickie.
Maria Medina
Maria is best friends with Stacey Carter, and is well known for having a collection of oversized polo shirts.
Raul Perez
Raul is David Pike's best friend.
David Pike
David is Richie Pike's older brother, and is usually suffering due to whatever scheme Richie gets pulled into.
Richie Pike
Richie is David Pike's younger brother and resident dinosaur fanatic.
Tyson Walker
Tyson is Grove Hill's biggest soccer fan.
Blue Russell
Blue is the second new kid to arrive at Grove Hill. He was placed in Mrs. Storch's homeroom, and began to realize that her students were not exactly normal.
Ariadne Spinner
Ari, although relatively not known for social interaction, is known for her obsession with spiders.
John Melvin West
Mel is the third new kid to arrive at Grove Hill and is the resident artist.
Vickie Wheilson
Vickie is Skate McGraw's cousin, and while she is also a skateboarder like him, she is known for her bright red hair and the loud colors she wears.
Mark Wolfson
Mark is known for his odd appearance, such as his large hands, feet, ears, and the stubby hairs growing on his chin. He is about 8-years-old and is Skip Wolfson's little brother.
Skip Wolfson
Skip is known for what his dog Lupe did during one of Grove Hill Elementary School Pet Day, and for his fear of buses. Skip's little brother, Mark, has an unusual secret.

=== Others ===
Morton
A weird fifth grade girl with a sarcastic sense of humor and a strange accent who only appears in "Don't Tell Mummy", she turns out to be a living mummy with supernatural powers. All the creepy things in the museum are caused by her evil brother. Together with Park, they lock her brother in the sarcophagus. By the end of the book, Park and Morton almost become friends and promise each other to meet once again.

== Similarity to Goosebumps ==
This series is similar in style and tone to the very popular Goosebumps series. Other children's horror series from the 1990s include Are You Afraid of the Dark?, Spooksville, Ghosts of Fear Street, Bone Chillers, Deadtime Stories, Shivers, Spinetinglers and Shadow Zone.
