= Mirror, Mirror II: Raven Dance =

- DVD cover
- Directed by: Jimmy Lifton
- Written by: Annette Cascone (concept); Gina Cascone (concept); Jimmy Lifton; Virginia Perfili
- Produced by: Jimmy Lifton
- Starring: Tracy Wells; Roddy McDowall; Sally Kellerman; Veronica Cartwright; Mark Ruffalo
- Cinematography: Troy Cook
- Edited by: Bruce Cook
- Music by: Jimmy Lifton
- Production company: Orphan Eyes
- Distributed by: Image Entertainment
- Release date: May 25, 1994
- Running time: 91 minutes
- Country: United States
- Language: English

Mirror, Mirror II: Raven Dance is a 1994 American horror film produced, co-written, and directed by Jimmy Lifton, and starring Tracy Wells, Roddy McDowall, Sally Kellerman, Veronica Cartwright, and Mark Ruffalo. A sequel to Mirror, Mirror (1990), its plot follows a teenage orphan who finds herself haunted by a mysterious mirror inside the Catholic orphanage she is living in.

The film was released directly-to-video in May 1994. It marked actor Mark Ruffalo's feature film debut.

== Cast ==
- Tracy Wells as Marlee
- Roddy McDowall as Dr. Lasky
- Sally Kellerman as Roslyn
- Lois Nettleton as Sister Marion
- Veronica Cartwright as Sister Aja
- William Sanderson as Roger
- Mark Ruffalo as Christian
- Carlton Beener as Jeffrey
- Sarah Douglas as Nicolette

== Release ==
Anchor Bay Entertainment released Mirror, Mirror II: Raven Dance on DVD on October 24, 2000. On March 9, 2004, Anchor Bay re-released the film on DVD as part of a four-film set featuring all of the films in the Mirror, Mirror series.

== Reception ==
=== Critical response ===
Joe Bob Briggs wrote of the film: "Nine dead bodies. Multiple blinding. One raven attack. Mirror licking. Table-saw to the back. Arm hacking. Gratuitous demon that goes by so fast you can blink and miss it. Spider Fu. Drive-In Academy Award nominations for Tracy Wells, as the bimbo in peril, for saying "Does God hate me? Am I cursed?" and "My whole life is dancing."" In his book The Horror Show Guide, Mike Mayo wrote: "The effects are the only thing this one has going for itself. They range from a guy in a silly rubber suit to some really good, inventive work done with lights at computers."
