= Shivers (novel series) =

Children's book series by M.D. Spenser

- The cover of Your Momma's A Werewolf, the 18th book in the Shivers series
- 36 books
- Author: M.D. Spenser
- Language: English
- Genre: Horror, thriller
- Publisher: Paradise Press
- Published: 1996–1998
- Media type: Print (paperback)

Shivers is a series of thirty-six children's horror novels written by M.D. Spenser. These are horror novels, each 120–125 pages long, for readers between the ages of 8 and 14. The series was created during the popularity of the Goosebumps series, and it has a similar style.

The Shivers series was published between 1995 and 1998. Also issued were compilations called "Four Scares in One", which featured four Shivers books in a single volume. Also, a Shivers-themed Puzzle & Activity Book was published. The series sold millions of copies worldwide.

In August 2011, the Shivers series began being republished as eBooks, available from the Amazon Kindle store, iBookstore, Sony Nook and Barnes & Noble.

M.D. Spenser is an international journalist born in the United States but living now in England. He is currently working on three books—a book on running; a humorous memoir about his time in journalism, titled "Occasionally Accurate"; and a major novel for young adults titled Some Say In Ice.

== List of books ==
1. The Enchanted Attic: When they move into an old house, two sisters begin to realize something sinister lies in the old attic. They must find out what it is before it is too late.
2. A Ghastly Shade of Green: When Jason's mother takes him and his brother to the Everglades, things begin to disappear, including their dog and family.
3. Ghost Writer: Amber and her family move into a 100-year-old house, where she discovers an old trunk filled with ghostly letters and she gets to meet the writer.
4. The Animal Rebellion: While staying at his uncle's farm, Winston discovers that the animals on the farm are planning to overthrow their human master.
5. The Locked Room: Brittany and her younger brother are wary of their mother's new husband and more scared when they find out that there is a connection between him and a locked room in their house.
6. The Haunting House: Caitlin's family move into an old, burnt-down house that is haunted by something other than ghosts.
7. The Awful Apple Orchard: Daniel and Sara spend their vacation at an apple orchard haunted by ghosts.
8. Terror on Troll Mountain: Paul explores the cliffs of Italy and finds a troll who feeds on children.
9. The Mystic's Spell: Timmy visits a carnival mystic who gives him the power to fight back against his tormentors, but the power may cost him his life unless he is careful with it.
10. The Curse of the New Kid: A troubled teen tells his story of how his presence in every school he transfers to leads to his tormentors dying.
11. Guess Who's Coming for Dinner: Josh suspects that his best friend, Michael, and his family are cannibals after Josh's favorite teacher disappears after a night at Michael's house.
12. The Secret of Fern Island: Kenny's excursion to a desert island leads to solving the mystery of a missing boy and a cursed lighthouse.
13. The Spider Kingdom: Freddy and Lumpy are captured by huge spiders and get dragged into the Spider Kingdom.
14. The Curse in the Jungle: On an archaeological dig in Guatemala, Harry gets lost and finds the skull of a Mayan ruler, which unleashes an ages-old curse.
15. Pool Ghoul: There is something strange afoot when Matt and Laura's new backyard pool begins terrorizing anyone who dares swim in it and all eyes are on their neighbor, Miss Pincher, as the one behind it.
16. The Beast Beneath the Boardwalk: Alec and his cousin Mary battle to stay alive in a hurricane while being hunted by the beast that lives beneath the boardwalk.
17. The Ghosts of Camp Massacre: Samantha is staying at a summer camp built near the site where a family was massacred by ghostly Native Americans a century ago. She later finds out the real truth behind the legend.
18. Your Momma's A Werewolf: A vacation in the woods of Michigan leads to Iggy's mom being attacked by a werewolf.
19. The Thing in Room 601: Liam and Diane are stuck in a haunted hotel room when their mom has to leave.
20. Babyface & the Killer Mob: Joey's wish to be a mobster comes true when he wakes up in the body of a gangster named Babyface.
21. A Waking Nightmare: A boy named Martin is being accused of committing destructive acts while sleepwalking and must find the culprit.
22. Lost in Dreamland: Twin siblings Bill and Barbara get trapped in an amusement park where everyone's nightmares come true.
23. Night of the Goat Boy: While at summer camp, Nathaniel finds himself face-to-face with a half-man/half-goat creature thought to be the stuff of legends.
24. The Ghosts of Devil's Marsh: Samantha's past is likely to haunt her when she joins her dad's family. She is fed up with the taunts and whispers of Nana: "DON'T BREAK A DEAD'S HEART".
25. A Ghostly Playmate: Virginia has a new friend: a ghost who also plays games with her and won't let her quit. The ghost wants her as a playmate forever.
26. One Foot in the Grave: When she and her family move to France for her dad's job, Bubbie meets a boy named Jean Luc and together they unleash a phantom.
27. Camp Fear: Jane and her friends take the rocky road and soon learn that camping can be very hazardous to their health. Somewhere out in the wilderness, they join their class for a 3-day camping adventure. Their camp was once part of a magnificent, mysterious estate, but now cries can be heard everywhere.
28. Watch 'em Kill: A boy named Phillip orders a pack of new and improved growing monster pills, which are supposed to grow when water is added, but the packaging mentioned nothing about them coming to life, growing larger than life, or eating human flesh.
29. The Terrible Terror Book: Kerri and Erin find a book that predicts bad things that come true.
30. Creepy Clothes: After their parents are in a car crash, Patricia and Sam are sent to stay with their estranged aunt. When they discover a trunk full of old clothes in her attic, they learn about the sins of the past.
31. Shriek Home Chicago: A year after Terror on Troll Mountain Paul learns that the monster that troubled him and his cousin Anthony has followed Anthony to Paul's home in Chicago.
32. Beware the Bog Girl: On vacation with her scientist father, Julie is troubled by the ghost of a spoiled girl who lives in the swamp.
33. The Forgotten Farmhouse: Nico and Ana get lost while horseback riding and get trapped in an old farmhouse haunted by its gruesomely slain owners.
34. Weirdo Waldo's Wax Museum: Billy and Crissy visit a wax museum in Washington, DC, where they discover a gruesome secret behind the lifelike figures.
35. Terror on Tomahawk Island: Sean and Wendy visit an island haunted by Native American spirits.
36. Madness at the Mall: Brothers Frank and Tom are trapped in a shopping mall with the souls of animals from the pet cemetery that the mall was built upon.

== Four Scares in One ==
Starting in 2002, compilations called "Four Scares in One", featured four Shivers books in a single volume. Around four editions were published.

== Similarity to Goosebumps ==
This series is similar in style and tone to the popular Goosebumps series. Other children's horror series from the 1990s include Are You Afraid of the Dark?, Bone Chillers, Deadtime Stories, Graveyard School, Spinetinglers, Spooksville, Shadow Zone, and Fright Time.
