= Robert Judd (actor) =

American actor

Robert Judd (c. 1926 – January 20, 1986) was an American actor who appeared on stage, television, and in occasional films. He is best remembered for his performances as the Devil (also referred to as Scratch or Legba) in Crossroads and as Toledo the piano player in the original production of August Wilson's Ma Rainey's Black Bottom.

== Life before acting ==
As a young man, Judd served in the United States Navy. After leaving the service in 1946, he went through a number of jobs, including clothes presser, and experiences before discovering acting in the late 1960s.

== Acting career ==
Judd's first known film credit was Across 110th Street (1972).

He co-starred with William Sanderson in the 1977 exploitation action film Fight for Your Life. In a 2017 interview, Sanderson spoke of his good rapport with Judd. "We talked a lot, we were very comfortable with one another and had a lot in common. At the end of each day's shoot we’d sit back and he’d have his Dewar's and I’d have my beer. I really respected him and how he handled what we did in the film. He was put in a lot of humiliating situations and I felt for him."

Judd's stage career included work with the Actor's Theatre of Louisville (as Crooks in Of Mice and Men), the Cincinnati Playhouse, and the Crossroads Theatre of New Jersey, as well as Off-Broadway productions. He appeared in the revival of Lillian Hellman's Watch on the Rhine, first at the Long Wharf Theatre in 1979 and then on Broadway in 1980.

Judd's TV work included Saturday Night Live, soap operas such as As the World Turns and The Guiding Light, and the 1980 PBS series Gettin' to Know Me, which revolved around an African-American family.

Ma Rainey's Black Bottom, starring Charles S. Dutton, had its first staged reading in 1982 at the Eugene O'Neill Theater Center in Waterford, Connecticut. The four main members of the cast, also featuring Joe Seneca and Leonard Jackson, almost immediately developed a very strong sense of ensemble. During early rehearsals, Jackson was asked to switch parts with Judd, who'd been assigned the role of Slow Drag the bassist. Judd had no objection at all, saying, "I told them that with this play, I didn't mind what role I played. From the minute I read it, I knew that it would make history."

After Wilson and director Lloyd Richards worked together for almost two years on the play, Ma Rainey opened at the Yale Repertory Theater in April 1984. It then moved to Broadway, where it ran from October 11, 1984, through June 9, 1985. Frank Rich, then theater critic for The New York Times, wrote, "As acted by Mr. Judd, Joe Seneca and Leonard Jackson, the monologues have the beauty and poignance of the old-time solos that the musicians improvise on their instruments."

Seneca and Judd were reunited in the cast of Walter Hill's film Crossroads. Judd portrayed Scratch in a brief, memorable performance. Clad in a black suit, broad-brimmed black hat, crisp white shirt, and black bowtie, the goateed Judd conveyed menace effectively with a broad smile. One review noted that the film got strong support from Judd, Joe Morton (as Scratch's assistant), and Akosua Busia.

Another article stated "he's level-headed and all-business...it's a welcome respite from so many hammy portrayals by actors who feel the need to portray the Devil as some kind of unhinged lunatic."

By the time that Crossroads was released in March 1986, however, Judd had died at age 59. He had been suffering from stomach cancer but never told anyone. His castmates in Ma Rainey had mistaken his bouts of coughing and nausea for stage anxiety.

Judd's obituary noted that he had worked as a counselor for several years for his favorite charity, Teens with Drug Problems, as well as a non-profit social services organization in Queens called Elmcor. Judd was also a talented photographer.

August Wilson contributed his "Memory of Actor Robert Judd" to the book Broadway Day & Night (1992). He reiterated the theme that Judd was a black man in America making his own rules. Wilson continued to write roles for Judd in each of his plays, citing him as an inspiration.

When Ma Rainey's Black Bottom was revived on Broadway in 2003, the production was dedicated to the memory of Theresa Merritt, Joe Seneca, and Robert Judd.
