= Deadtime Stories (TV series) =

- Genre: Horror; Fantasy
- Based on: Deadtime Stories by Annette and Gina Cascone
- Starring: Jennifer Stone; Piper Reese
- Country of origin: United States
- No. of seasons: 1
- No. of episodes: 11

Production
- Running time: 30 minutes
- Production companies: DHX Cookie Jar; DHX Media

Original release
- Network: Nickelodeon
- Release: November 2, 2012 – October 26, 2014

Deadtime Stories is an anthology horror-fantasy television series written by Annette Cascone, based on the book series created by Annette and Gina Cascone. It premiered on Nickelodeon on November 2, 2012, and aired through November 14, 2013.

== Premise ==
The series stars Jennifer Stone as "The Babysitter" who reads the Deadtime Stories to the children while babysitting. Piper Reese stars in the recurring-turned-lead role of Nancy Patanski, the neighborhood tough girl who ended up facing off with Giggles the Killer Clown while babysitting in Who's Giggling Now.

== Episodes ==
No.	Title	Original release date
1	"Grave Secrets"	November 2, 2012
Amanda Peterson is haunted by the ghost of a young girl who will not rest until Amanda helps her find her doll which Amanda's neighbor is determined to keep buried underground.
2	"Invasion of the Appleheads"	October 3, 2013
Katie and Andy Lawrence learn something while in an apple orchard that a long time ago, people were cursed and turned into zombies.
3	"Along Came a Spider"	October 3, 2013
When Max and Mikey stumble upon a science kit, they find out that some dead animals in the kit are not dead.
4	"The Witching Game"	October 10, 2013
When Lindsey Jordan and her friends play the wishing game "Bloody Mary" in front of a strange antique mirror, one by one their wishes start coming true, with horrifying results. Note: This episode is based on the Deadtime Story book "Mirror, Mirror".
5	"The Beast of Baskerville"	October 10, 2013
Adam Riley and his friends are hunted by the man-monster, Jimmy Leeds during a camping trip.
6	"Terror in Tiny Town"	October 17, 2013
Willy Tyler learns the horrifying truth behind a doll in his latest train model, Hurly the Hobo.
7	"Revenge of the Goblins"	October 17, 2013
When Nina Russo and her friend Sammy come upon a creepy old tree in the woods with a door carved into its trunk, they find a little green statue inside holding a luminous ball, and when Sammy removes the ball, he unknowingly opens the door to the goblin world.
8	"Grandpa's Monster Movies"	October 24, 2013
After seeing monster movies at their family reunion, Catan Thomas and Lea Rose learn a disturbing secret about their family.
9	"Ghost Knight"	November 7, 2013
Cody, visiting his G.T. (Grandpa Tom), thought the only excitement will come from the crazy Mr. Jeevers, who drives a golf cart very recklessly and keeps ranting about a "metal-headed murdering madman".
10	"Little Magic Shop of Horrors"	November 14, 2013
Peter Newman buys a magic kit from a strange store so he can have an act for the school talent show and discovers that the magic is dangerous when he accidentally kills his best friend Bo.
11	"Who's Giggling Now?"	October 26, 2014
Nancy Patanski brings a friend along to babysit at a house that is still inhabited by the spirit of its previous owner, Henry Howard Froam aka Giggles the Killer Clown. Note: This episode was released on October 26, 2014 on Vimeo, and on October 31 on CITV.

== Broadcast ==
Deadtime Stories aired on Nickelodeon in the United States from October 3 to November 14, 2013. The show aired on TVOntario's Programming block called TVOKids in Canada in 2012, and on CITV in the UK in 2013. It later aired on Disney XD in Canada.
