= Shadow Zone (novels) =

Children's horror novel series

Shadow Zone is a series of 13 children's horror fiction books written in the 1990s by several authors using the pen name J. R. Black.

Each book is a different story, with new characters. A child or a few children meet a monster who asks for help and usually threatens them or their family. Aggressive at the beginning, they may finally be nice or touching. The books use black humor.

Two of the books, The Undead Express and My Teacher Ate My Homework, have been made into films.

== List of titles in the Shadow Zone series ==
1. The Ghost of Chicken Liver Hill: Tony is dragged into an eerie mystery when the ghost of a teenager named Buddy Parker begins to haunt him.
2. Guess Who's Dating a Werewolf?: Annie has always had a crush on her older sister Sara's boyfriend, Jake Wolfe, until she witnesses Jake's transformation under the full moon. Annie is confident that Sara is going to be his next victim and breaking them up has now become a matter of life and death.
3. The Witches Next Door: Jennifer becomes the target of two witches who want to make her one of them.
4. Revenge of the Computer Phantoms: Mike Willis's life is transformed into a nightmare when a computer game comes to life, releasing Thor, a powerful action hero who likes life outside the computer, and a host of evil computer phantoms into the real world.
5. The Undead Express: Compulsive liar Zach accidentally stumbles into a vampire community and befriends a bloodsucker named Valentine, who may not have Zach's best intentions in mind.
6. Good Night, Mummy!: Blaise may regret wanting some excitement in her life when a mummy asks for her help.
7. One Slimy Summer: Max and Diana must find a way to return a tentacled monster back to its native realm.
8. Bite of the Living Dead: While Josh is exploring his new backyard, he makes a terrifying discovery: the new decorations in his backyard are actually tombstones and the bodies are not quite at rest.
9. Alien Under My Bed: As if her life has not been going through enough changes, Hayley discovers that her room has been chosen as a home away from home for an alien.
10. Scream Around the Campfire: Gina and Frank's summer turns terrifying quick after they see a large, hairy monster in the woods.
11. My Teacher Ate My Homework: Frustrated fifth grader Jesse fashions a voodoo doll of his boring, overbearing teacher as a joke, but when the doll comes alive to seek revenge, he finds there are worse things than too much homework.
12. Skeleton in My Closet: Riley and Matt find their lives turned upside down by the discovery of a human skeleton behind the wall of their house, bones that somehow they just cannot get rid of, no matter what they do.
13. Attack of the Mutant Bugs: While exploring a dilapidated mine, Katie Callahan and her cousin Miles discover a group of miners who were left to die in a cave years ago, but survived to mutate into giant insects and now seek revenge on those who abandoned them.

== Similarity to Goosebumps ==
This series is similar in style and tone to the popular Goosebumps series. Other children's horror series from the 1990s include Are You Afraid of the Dark?, Bone Chillers, Deadtime Stories, Shivers, Spinetinglers, Spooksville and Graveyard School.
