= Standby...Lights! Camera! Action! =

- Genre: Cinematography; Documentary
- Directed by: Stan Swan
- Presented by: Leonard Nimoy
- Composer: Louis Caristo
- Country of origin: United States
- No. of seasons: 1
- No. of episodes: 20

Production
- Executive producers: Michael Baumohl; Roger Yager
- Producer: Terry Laughlin
- Running time: 1 hour

Original release
- Network: Nickelodeon
- Release: October 1982 – December 31, 1987

Standby...Lights! Camera! Action! is an American educational television series hosted by Leonard Nimoy. The program aired on Nickelodeon from October 1982 to December 31, 1987. Episodes of the show include interviews with film crew members and examine the stages of production for various motion pictures in a behind-the-scenes format.

== Format ==
Episodes of the series open with host Leonard Nimoy at the Nickelodeon studio, introducing himself and announcing the episode's focus (such as performing stunts, special effects or animation). Nimoy would then leave the Nickelodeon studio to visit a filming location, where he described how different motion pictures incorporated the episode's topic. He typically examined three upcoming films in each one-hour segment before returning to the Nickelodeon studio and signing off.

== History ==
Nickelodeon executive Cy Schneider green-lit the series in 1981 in an aim to add variety to Nickelodeon's schedule, which at the time only consisted of five looped programs. Nickelodeon initially ordered a twelve-episode first season, later increased to twenty. In a 1984 interview with The New York Times, Warner-Amex president John A. Schneider stated that having Nimoy host the series was part of a strategy to "seduce kids into watching" using popular actors. When asked why he chose to host the program despite having more profitable opportunities, Nimoy explained that he supported the network.

TV Guide's panel of educators and executives recommended the series, citing it as an "excellent offering" on cable, in February 1986.

== Episodes ==
| No. | Title |
|---|---|
| 1 | "Critics" |
Nimoy interviews a 16-year-old film critic and Kevin Dillon. He also goes behind-the-scenes of Return to Oz and A Soldier's Story.
| 2 | "Stunts" |
Nimoy interviews three stuntmen (Gary Paul, Sonny Landham and Jim Lovelett) and learns about fire stunts used in Backlot and Fleshburn. He also goes behind-the-scenes of Ghostbusters and The Karate Kid.
| 3 | "Prosthetics" |
Nimoy interviews makeup artist Doug Drexler. He later goes behind-the-scenes of The Black Cauldron, The Man with One Red Shoe and Legend.
| 4 | "Clay Animation" |
Nimoy interviews a clay animator, travels to Australia to compare filmmaking practices, and presents clips of Greystroke.
| 5 | "Kid Actors" |
Nimoy interviews casting manager Barbara Jarret and goes behind-the-scenes of A View to a Kill, The Goonies, and Cocoon.
| 6 | "Special Effects" |
Nimoy interviews a special effects artist and goes behind-the-scenes of E.T. the Extra-Terrestrial, Conan the Barbarian and Gandhi.
| 7 | "Sci-Fi Costumes" |
Nimoy is given a double-headed costume by a costume designer. He also goes behind-the-scenes of Nineteen Eighty-Four, Dune, and No Small Affair.
| 8 | "Stars" |
Nimoy interviews Vincent Spano and a hairstylist. He then presents clips of Christine and The Keep.
| 9 | "Animal Actors" |
Nimoy interviews an animal talent agent and a dialect coach, then goes behind-the-scenes of Morons from Outer Space and Ladyhawke.
| 10 | "Animation" |
Nimoy goes behind-the-scenes of Rock & Rule and visits Universal Studios.
| 11 | "Acting" |
Nimoy interviews director Marisa Silver and actresses Rainbow Harvest and Sarah Boyd from the movie Old Enough. He then goes behind-the-scenes of Turk 182.
| 12 | "Editing" |
Nimoy interviews Peter Riegert, then presents clips from Blue Thunder, Octopussy, and Spacehunter.
| 13 | "Advertising" |
Nimoy interviews a studio's vice president of advertising, then presents clips from Bullshot, Twilight Zone: The Movie and Krull.
| 14 | "Marketing" |
Nimoy interviews film marketer Herb Hauser, then presents clips from Remo Williams and Back to the Future.
| 15 | "Star Trek III" |
A special Star Trek-themed installment promoting the Nimoy-directed Star Trek III: The Search for Spock. Nimoy interviews George Takei (Sulu) and various fans (Trekkies).
| 16 | "Casting" |
Nimoy interviews a casting director, then presents clips from Superman III, Champions and Psycho II.
| 17 | "Props" |
Nimoy meets a prop designer from Hollywood, then goes behind-the-scenes of The Toy and The Dark Crystal.
| 18 | "Student Films" |
Nimoy interviews film students at New York University and goes behind-the-scenes of Dreamchild. He then presents clips of Transylvania 6-5000 and Bad Medicine.
| 19 | "Young Filmmakers" |
Nimoy compares independent films by young filmmakers to ones produced by major studios (including clips from WarGames and Krull).
| 20 | "Memorabilia" |
Nimoy speaks with a film memorabilia collector, then goes behind-the-scenes of Out of Africa, Enemy Mine, and The Jewel of the Nile.
