= Cascone =

Cascone is an Italian surname, which originated as an augmented form of Casco; it means "large helmet". It is also found in Malta. People with this surname include:

- Annette Cascone, 1980s and 1990s American author and screenwriter
- Gina Cascone, 1980s and 1990s American author and screenwriter
- Gioacchino Cascone (born 1972), Italian rower
- Kim Cascone (born 1955), American electronic music composer
