= Deadtime Stories (novel) =

Novel series by Annette and Gina Cascone

Deadtime Stories is a series of children's horror fiction novels created by authors Annette and Gina Cascone writing under the name AG Cascone.

== Synopsis ==
Deadtime Stories is a children's horror fiction series in the same vein as its rival series Goosebumps. Subjects vary from hauntings to monsters and other supernatural or paranormal happenings that normal school-aged children experience and who may be directly or indirectly involved in them. The books are published by Tor/Starscape and the Scholastic Corporation. The television series based on the book series was created by the Hillenbrand brothers, David and Scott, and the Cascone sisters, Annette and Gina, and launched on Nickelodeon on November 2, 2012, and on CITV in the U.K. on October 31, 2013.

== Deadtime Stories series ==
1. Terror in Tiny Town (1996): Train loving Willy Tyler discovers the horrifying truth about the latest addition to his model Tiny Town, Hurly the Hobo.
2. Invasion of the Appleheads (1996, 2012): Robin and Andy's trip through a tourist trap known for its apple orchard turns into a nightmare when their parents are mutated into dried apple dolls by an evil witch.
3. Along Came a Spider (1996): Max and Mikey find a science kit filled with insects, one of which is a mutant spider.
4. Ghost Knight (1996): While at his grandfather's retirement home, Cody discovers an abandoned building haunted by a princess whose parents were killed by a black knight.
5. Revenge of the Goblins (1996): After unintentionally stealing a green ball they found in the woods, Nina Russo and her friend Sammy accidentally open the door to a realm of goblins.
6. Little Magic Shop of Horrors (1996, 2012): Peter and Bo sign up for the school's talent show and buy a magic kit from a strange corner store that included a box that causes Bo to lose his head.
7. It Came from the Deep (1997): Randi and Garret's vacation is cut short when they learn that the resort they are staying at is run by sea mutants.
8. Grave Secrets (1997, 2012): Amanda learns that her old mean neighbor has angered a ghost of a young girl who will not rest until she has her doll returned—which is in Amanda's backyard.
9. Mirror, Mirror (1997, retitled as The Witching Game in 2012): Lindsey Jordan and Bree Daniels play "Mary Weatherworth" (a "Bloody Mary"-style spirit summoning game) on a mirror haunted by a witch who makes all of their wishes come true—at a horrifying price.
10. Grandpa's Monster Movies (1997, 2012): Catan "C.T." Thomas and his cousin, Lea Rose attend their family reunion at their grandparent's farm and learn a particularly disturbing secret about their family after watching some home movies.
11. Nightmare on Planet X (1997): A freak accident knocks an airplane out of the sky and a boy named Nicky (who was on that flight) finds himself on an alien spaceship about to be dissected.
12. Welcome to the Terror-Go-Round (1997): Nothing much happens in Middletown until a strange carnival rolls into town and Alex and Joey take a ride on a merry-go-round that spins them back in time.
13. The Beast of Baskerville (1997, 2012): A camping trip goes downhill fast when Adam Riley and their friends are being hunted by the local man-monster, Jimmy Leeds, who lives in a well.
14. Trapped in Tiny Town (1997): In the sequel to Terror in Tiny Town, Willy and his friends are sent back to Tiny Town, and must avoid Hurly the Hobo at ALL costs.
15. Cyber Scare (1997): When Roy and Danny's obnoxious cousin Ernest responds to a suspicious e-mail from someone called Vlad, he is swept into a computer game which Roy and Danny must win, not only to get Ernest out, but to keep from getting trapped themselves.
16. Night of the Pet Zombies (1997): Two boys, David and Eddie use a potion to bring dead pets back from the grave, only to learn what happens when one tampers with life and death.
17. Faerie Tale (1997): Colin and David acquire the ability to see fairies, but the blessing becomes a curse when the fae begin pestering humans.

== Similarity to Goosebumps ==
This series is similar in style and tone to the popular Goosebumps series. Other children's horror series from the 1990s include Are You Afraid of the Dark?, Bone Chillers, Shivers, Graveyard School, Spinetinglers, Spooksville and Shadow Zone.
