= Shadowzone =

Shadowzone or shadow zone may refer to:

- Shadow zone, an area in which a secondary seismic wave is not detected due to it not being able to pass through the core of the earth
- Shadow Zone (Static-X album), a 2003 album by the band Static-X
- Shadow Zone (Axel Rudi Pell album), a 2002 album by guitarist Axel Rudi Pell
- Oxygen minimum zone, the zone in which oxygen saturation in seawater in the ocean is at its lowest
- Shadowzone (film), a 1990 science fiction film
- Shadow Zone (novels), a horror novel series for kids
