= Scott Campbell (musician) =

American musician, composer, and actor

- Born: March 17, 1958 (age 68); Detroit, Michigan, United States
- Genre: Punk rock
- Occupations: Musician, composer, actor
- Instruments: Guitar, piano, alto saxophone, oboe, violin
- Years active: 1973–present
- Label: Nebula
- Formerly of: The Sillies
- Website: www.s-campbell.com

Scott Campbell (born March 17, 1958, in Detroit, Michigan) is an American musician, composer, and actor.

== Career ==
Scott Campbell was born in Detroit, MI. He began writing poetry at the age of six and songs at the age of eight. He taught himself guitar, piano, alto saxophone, oboe, violin, and multitrack audio recording. He formed Nebula Records in 1972 and released the single Apparition/Astral Spirit in 1973 under the band name Apparition, playing all the instruments on both songs.

Campbell formed The Sillies in 1977, considered one of Detroit's first modern punk rock bands. In March 1978, he began booking and managing Bookie's Club 870, Detroit's first concert nightclub catering to punk and alternative music. The Police, Ultravox, The Damned, John Cale, Peter Hammill, The Cramps, and many other acts made their Detroit debuts at Bookie's. As a result, numerous other clubs catering to original live music sprang up as a result of the success of Bookie's.

Campbell left Bookie's in late 1979 and continued presenting concerts and benefits around Detroit. He began performing under his own name in 1982 and released the single "I'm Saving Myself For Angela Cartwright", in 1986. Campbell appeared in the films Mirror, Mirror (1989) and Hoffa (1992). He also produced and hosted Music Box on Detroit TV from 1985 to 1992 and the Detroit Music Scene radio program from 1986 to 1997, featuring the music of over 1,000 Detroit area musicians as well as interviews with Iggy Pop, The Ramones, Echo & the Bunnymen, The Cult, and other international recording artists.

The Decline and Fall of Scott Campbell CD was released in 2000 and spent nine weeks at number 1 on MP3.com's charts. The Sillies CD America's Most Wanton was released in 2002.
