= M.D. Spenser =

American novelist

M.D. Spenser (born May 1, 1953) is an American author and radio host now based in Godalming, UK. He is known as the host of The Big Fat Wide Americana Hour, an eclectic internet radio show featuring diverse styles of American music—country, folk, blues, soul, jazz and more—all in one show. Each show also features music from diverse eras, from the 1940s to the present day.

Spenser's radio style is recognizable for relating odd historical tidbits about the musicians he features. He is distinctive for his attempts to make the case that different genres of American music are related, and that the cross-pollenization of different American genres with roots in places such as Africa and Ireland has created a cultural richness that has helped American music circle the globe.

In addition, Spenser is the author of the 36-book Shivers series. The books are aimed at readers between the ages of 8 and 14.

The books were published by Paradise Press between 1996 and 1998, and they sold millions of copies in the United States and throughout the British Commonwealth. Spenser also wrote the six-book Humano Morphs series.

Books 1, 2 and 3 in the Shivers series - The Enchanted Attic, A Ghastly Shade of Green, and Ghost Writer - were republished as e-books 2011.

Spenser is now writing a novel set in modern London, titled Some Say In Ice. Under another name, he has written a book about running. He is also working on a humorous memoir about his years as an international journalist, titled "Occasionally Accurate".

Spenser lives in Godalming, England, with his dog Buddy and his parrot Paco.
