= Fight for Your Life =

1977 US exploitation film directed by Robert A. Endelson

- DVD cover
- Directed by: Robert A. Endelson
- Written by: Straw Weisman
- Produced by: Robert A. Endelson; William Mishkin
- Starring: William Sanderson; Robert Judd; Yvonne Ross
- Cinematography: Lloyd Freidus
- Edited by: Robert A. Endelson
- Music by: Jeff Slevin
- Distributed by: William Mishkin Motion Pictures
- Release date: November 1977 (New York City)
- Running time: 82 minutes
- Country: United States
- Language: English
- Budget: $35,000

Fight for Your Life is a 1977 American blaxploitation thriller film directed by Robert A. Endelson and starring William Sanderson and Robert Judd. The story revolves around three criminals (a White, Mexican, and Asian male) who hold a Black family hostage and force them to fight for their lives.

== Synopsis ==
Kane, a hate-fuelled racist redneck absconds from jail with his sidekicks (an Asian and a Mexican). They hole up in the secluded house of Ted Turner, a black minister, and his family. After threats and harsh epithets are exchanged, the minister is forced to take action to defend his family.

== Cast ==
- William Sanderson – as Jessie Lee Kane
- Robert Judd – as Ted Turner
- Cathrine Peppers – as Mrs. Turner
- Lela Small – as Grandma Turner
- Yvonne Ross – as Corrie Turner
- Reggie Rock Bythewood – as Floyd Turner (as Reginald Bythewood)
- Ramon Saunders – as Val Turner
- Queenie Endelson – as Dog
- Daniel Faraldo – Chino
- Peter Yoshida – Ling
- Bonnie Martin – Karen
- David Cargill – Lt. Reilly
- Richard A. Rubin – Captain Hamilton
- David Dewlow – Joey
- Pepe Hern – Navarro
- Nick Hardin- Tony

== Reception ==
Fight for Your Life has received a negative response from critics. TV Guide called it "a vile low-budget film that couldn't have found a receptive audience even during the height of tough blaxploitation pictures." Others have defended the film, finding it an objective look at racism at its worst; the film enjoys a cult following among fans of extreme cinema and grindhouse.

== Censorship ==
Fight For Your Life was denied a British theatrical release in 1981, but a video release the following year allowed the public brief access to the film before it wound up on the video nasties list and was outlawed. It is notable for being the only 'video nasty' to appear on the list due to language, specifically the racism displayed by Sanderson's character.

== Availability ==
Fight For Your Life was denied a British cinema release when it was rejected by the BBFC in October 1981; it was briefly available in the United Kingdom on the independent video label Vision On, released circa 1982, but was outlawed with the advent of the Video Recordings Act (1984). A remastered DVD was issued in the United States by Blue Underground. The director passed on providing a commentary track for the DVD reissue, but did grant an interview for the book Nightmare USA in which he re-watched the film with his maid, Dorothy, and both provided retrospective insights on the film. It was presented at the Quentin Tarantino Film Festival in the QT Six Lineup showing held in October 2005.

The original film negative, stored by the film rights holder in a New Jersey basement, was destroyed by Hurricane Sandy in 2012.

== See also ==
- List of films featuring home invasions
