= Ma Rainey's Black Bottom =

1982 play by August Wilson

- Original language: English
- Written by: August Wilson
- Series: The Pittsburgh Cycle
- Subject: A blues group waits to get to work in the studio, and tempers flare.
- Genre: Drama
- Setting: Chicago, early 1927

Premiere
- Date: 1984
- Place: Eugene O'Neill Theater Center; Waterford, Connecticut

Ma Rainey's Black Bottom is a 1982 play by August Wilson, set in a recording studio in 1920s Chicago, during a recording session of the titular song by the blues singer Ma Rainey. The play deals with issues of race, art, religion, and the historic exploitation of Black recording artists by white producers; it is part of the ten-play Pittsburgh Cycle (also referred to as The Century Cycle) by the playwright, chronicling the 20th century African-American experience.

Ma Rainey's Black Bottom was published in the early 1980s and premiered at the Eugene O'Neill Theater Center. Its Broadway debut at the Cort Theatre in 1984 won a New York Drama Critics' Circle award and garnered a Tony Award nomination for Best Play. In 2020, Wilson's play was adapted for film.

== Plot ==
In a Chicago recording studio in 1927, Ma Rainey's band players Cutler, Toledo, Slow Drag, and Levee gather to record a new album of her songs. As they wait for her to arrive they tell stories, joke, philosophize, and argue. Tension is apparent between the young hot-headed trumpeter Levee who dreams of having his own band, and veterans Cutler, Slow Drag, and Toledo who all desire to stay true to Ma Rainey.

By the time Ma Rainey arrives with entourage in tow, recording has fallen badly behind schedule, enraging producers Sturdyvant and Irvin. Ma's insistence that her stuttering nephew Sylvester speak the title song's introduction wreaks further havoc. As the band waits for various technical problems to be solved, Levee and Cutler come to blows. Levee is then simultaneously fired by Ma for his uncompromising behavior and rejected by producer Sturdyvant when he tries to get his own record deal. In a rage, Levee fatally stabs Toledo, destroying any possibility of a future for himself.

== Productions ==
The play had its first staged reading in 1982 at the Eugene O'Neill Theater Center in Waterford, Connecticut. The four main members of the cast -- Charles S. Dutton as Levee, Joe Seneca as Cutler, Leonard Jackson as Slow Drag, and Robert Judd as Toledo—almost immediately developed a very strong sense of ensemble. At that time, the best-known actor in the cast was Theresa Merritt, who played Ma.

Direction was by Lloyd Richards, one of August Wilson's most frequent collaborators. Richards and Wilson worked together for almost two years on the play. It opened at the Yale Repertory Theater in April 1984, and then moved to Broadway's Cort Theatre. The show opened on October 11, 1984, and show ran for 276 performances. It received a 1985 Tony Award nomination for Best Play; Dutton and Merritt were nominated for acting awards. The production was recorded and released by Manhattan Records.

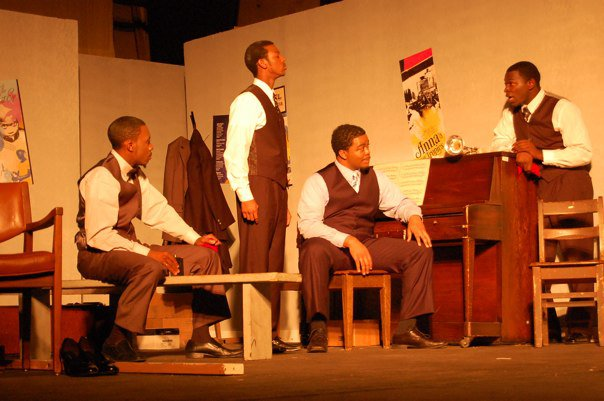
A performance in 2009

It was first performed in the UK at the Royal National Theatre in London in 1989 in a production by Howard Davies starring Clarke Peters and Hugh Quarshie as Toledo and Levee. It was enormously well received.

A Broadway revival opened on February 6, 2003, at the Royale Theatre, featuring Dutton reprising his role as Levee and Whoopi Goldberg as Ma. Directed by Marion McClinton, the show ran for 68 performances.

Subsequent UK revivals have taken place in Liverpool at the Playhouse starring Melanie La Barrie as Ma and Cornelius Macarthy as Levee (2004, direction: Gemma Bodinetz) and the Manchester Royal Exchange Theatre in a production starring Antonio Fargas as Toledo, Ram John Holder as Slow Drag, and Johnnie Fiori as Ma (2006, direction: Jacob Murray).

In 2016 the National Theatre in London revived the show to great critical acclaim, garnering a Laurence Olivier award for best revival. The production starred O-T Fagbenle as Levee and Sharon D. Clarke as Ma Rainey.

In 2020, a film adaptation by screenwriter Ruben Santiago-Hudson and director George C. Wolfe, starring Viola Davis and Chadwick Boseman, was released.

A 2026 production includes actor Harry Lennix as musical director, who has also starred in past productions of the play. The Chicago Sun-Times review said, "In a remarkable staging, the powerhouse performances make the production feel real and raw, with Al’Jaleel McGhee stealing the show as ambitious trumpeter Levee."

== Cast and characters ==
| Characters | 1984 Original Broadway cast | 2003 Broadway revival | 2016 West End revival |
|---|---|---|---|
| Ma Rainey | Theresa Merritt | Whoopi Goldberg | Sharon D. Clarke |
| Levee (trumpeter) | Charles S. Dutton | Charles S. Dutton | O-T Fagbenle |
| Slow Drag (bassist) | Leonard Jackson | Stephen McKinley Henderson | Giles Terera |
| Toledo (pianist) | Robert Judd | Thomas Jefferson Byrd | Lucian Msamati |
| Cutler (trombonist) | Joe Seneca | Carl Gordon | Clint Dyer |
| Irvin (Ma's manager) | Lou Criscuolo | Jack Davidson | Finbar Lynch |
| Sturdyvant (studio owner) | John Carpenter | Louis Zorich | Stuart McQuarrie |
| Dussie Mae | Aleta Mitchell | Heather Alicia Simms | Tamara Lawrance |
| Sylvester (Ma's nephew) | Scott Davenport-Richards | Anthony Mackie | Tunji Lucas |
| Policeman | Christopher Loomis | Tony Cucci | John Paul Connolly |

== Awards and nominations ==
=== Original Broadway production ===
| Year | Award | Category | Nominee(s) | Result |
|---|---|---|---|---|
| 1985 | Tony Awards | Best Play | August Wilson | Nominated |
| 1985 | Tony Awards | Best Performance by a Featured Actor in a Play | Charles S. Dutton | Nominated |
| 1985 | Tony Awards | Best Performance by a Featured Actress in a Play | Theresa Merritt | Nominated |
| 1985 | Drama Desk Awards | Outstanding Play | | Nominated |
| 1985 | Drama Desk Awards | Outstanding Featured Actor in a Play | Charles S. Dutton | Won |
| 1985 | Grammy Awards | Best Spoken Word or Non-Musical Recording | Mike Berniker (producer) & the Original Broadway Cast | Won |
| 1985 | New York Drama Critics' Circle Awards | Best Play | August Wilson | Won |
| 1985 | Theatre World Awards | | Charles S. Dutton | Won |

=== 2003 Broadway revival ===
| Year | Award | Category | Nominee | Result |
|---|---|---|---|---|
| 2003 | Tony Awards | Best Performance by a Featured Actor in a Play | Thomas Jefferson Byrd | Nominated |
| 2003 | Theatre World Awards | | Thomas Jefferson Byrd | Won |

=== 2016 West End revival ===
| Year | Award | Category | Result |
|---|---|---|---|
| 2016 | Laurence Olivier Awards | Best Revival | Won |
