= Yvonne Ross =

American actress

Yvonne Ross is an American actress. She played the character of Corrie Turner in the film Fight for Your Life

== Filmography ==
- Fight for Your Life (1977)
- Cover Me: Based on the True Life of an FBI Family (2000)
