= Voodoo Dawn =

1990 film

- VHS cover
- Directed by: Steven Fierberg
- Written by: Jeffrey Delman; Evan Dunsky; Thomas Rendon; John A. Russo
- Produced by: Steven D. Mackler
- Starring: Tony Todd; Gina Gershon; Raymond St. Jacques; Theresa Merritt
- Cinematography: James McCalmont
- Edited by: Keith Reamer
- Music by: Larry Juris
- Production company: Stillwell Productions
- Release date: January 24, 1991
- Running time: 83 minutes
- Country: United States
- Language: English

Voodoo Dawn is a 1991 American horror film directed by Steven Fierberg and starring Tony Todd, Raymond St. Jacques, Theresa Merritt and Gina Gershon. It was written by Jeffrey Delman, Evan Dunsky, Thomas Rendon and John A. Russo, and produced by Steven D. Mackler.

The film was adapted from the eponymous pulp horror novel by John A. Russo, known also as the screenwriter for Night of the Living Dead.

== Plot ==
In the Deep South, a diabolical, machete-wielding voodoo priest is busily turning Haitian migrant farm workers into flesh-eating, zombie slaves. However, his plans are disrupted by the arrival of two college students searching for a missing colleague who turns out to have been one of the priest's earlier zombie experiments.

== Cast ==
- Tony Todd as Makoute
- Raymond St. Jacques as Claude
- Theresa Merritt as Madame Daslay
- Gina Gershon as Tina
- J. Grant Albrecht as Tony
- Kirk Baily as Kevin
- Billy 'Sly' Williams as Miles
- Georgia Allen as Suzanne
- Gloria Reuben as Girl on Boat

== Production ==
Voodoo Dawn was shot in South Carolina.

== Reception ==
Variety called it "an atmospheric supernatural thriller for genre fans". Nigel Honeybone of HorrorNews.Net wrote that it should be watched by horror fans based on the novelty value of having been written by Russo. Peter Dendle wrote in The Zombie Movie Encyclopedia, "Though acting and production value are solid, the script is outdated by about forty years and assumes we want to see more witch doctor than zombie."
