= Shadow Zone: My Teacher Ate My Homework =

1997 film by Stephen Williams

Shadow Zone: My Teacher Ate My Homework is a 1997 comedy horror film by Stephen Williams and the second film based on a Shadow Zone book.

== Plot ==
The Grim Reaper appears in a spookily themed classroom, and tells a tale about a student named Jesse Hackett, who hates his teacher, Mrs. Fink, and is soon doomed to be trapped in the Shadow Zone. After all, to enter the Shadow Zone, one merely needs a touch of evil.

Jesse Hackett finds a doll at a store resembling his teacher, and things start to take a turn for the worse when it comes to life. Jesse and his friends eventually manage to destroy the evil doll. Then Jesse Hackett and Mrs. Fink reconcile. Jesse never becomes an eternal guest at the Shadow Zone.

The Grim Reaper tells the audience that he hopes to see them doomed, and that he will have a room waiting for them in the Shadow Zone. Then with a chilling laugh, he walks down the school's hall to the entrance and disappears.

== Cast ==
- Shelley Duvall as Mrs. Fink
- Gregory Smith as Jesse
- Dara Permutter
- Mackenzie Gray
- Karen Robinson as Mrs. Marco

== Reception ==
A retrospective review placed the film in the veins of Goosebumps but had a mixed assessment of the overall production in terms of children's horror achievements. Another review gave a positive review to the film, stating that it has a "decent spooky feel" and that the film combines the goofy horror with an interesting story. The same review, comparing the film with the original book and another film adaptation of a book from the same series, found a film to be a step up from Shadow Zone: Undead Express.
