= Rainbow Harvest =

American actress

- Occupation: Actress
- Years active: 1983–1991
- Spouse: Kevin Wixted (m. 1989)

Rainbow Harvest is an American actress best known for her roles as Karen in Old Enough, Megan Gordon in Mirror, Mirror, and Daryl Tarses in television sitcom series FM. She was active between 1983 and 1991 before leaving the acting profession to work behind the scenes until she eventually left the film industry entirely.

== Personal life ==
Harvest married actor Kevin Wixted whom she met filming the episode "Cory and Dean Got Married" of 21 Jump Street where they played the titular characters.

== Filmography ==
=== Film ===
| Year | Title | Role | Notes |
|---|---|---|---|
| 1984 | Old Enough | Karen | |
| 1986 | Streets of Gold | Brenda | |
| 1990 | Mirror, Mirror | Megan Gordon | |
| 1990 | And Another Honkytonk Girl Says She Will | Adelaide | Short film |

Earth Angel 1991

=== Television ===
| Year | Title | Role | Notes |
|---|---|---|---|
| 1985 | Miami Vice | Angela | Episode: "Milk Run" |
| 1988 | 21 Jump Street | Cory | Episode: "Cory and Dean Got Married" |
| 1989-1990 | FM | Daryl Tarses | Recurring role |
| 1990 | Father Dowling Mysteries | Trudy | Episode: "Solid Gold Headache Mystery" |
| 1991 | Earth Angel | Cindy | TV movie |
| 1991 | Fever | Michelle | TV movie |
| 1991 | Pink Lightning | Poo | TV movie |
