= Mirror, Mirror (1990 film) =

- Theatrical release poster
- Directed by: Marina Sargenti
- Written by: Annette Cascone; Gina Cascone; Marina Sargenti; Yuri Zeltser
- Produced by: Jimmy Lifton
- Starring: Rainbow Harvest; Karen Black; Yvonne De Carlo; William Sanderson
- Cinematography: Robert Brinkmann
- Edited by: Barry Dresner; Glenn Morgan
- Music by: Scott Campbell; Jimmy Lifton
- Production company: Orphan Eyes
- Distributed by: New City Releasing
- Release date: August 31, 1990
- Running time: 104 minutes
- Country: United States
- Language: English

Mirror, Mirror is a 1990 American supernatural horror film directed by Marina Sargenti, based on a screenplay by Annette Cascone and Gina Cascone, and starring Karen Black, Rainbow Harvest, Yvonne De Carlo, and William Sanderson. The film follows a teenage outcast who finds herself drawn to an antique mirror left in the house she and her mother have moved into. A soundtrack was released in 1990 through Orphan Records.

Three sequels followed in 1994, 1995 and 2000. The film has gone on to develop a cult following in the years since its release.

== Plot ==
In 1950s Iowa, Mary Weatherford sacrifices her sister Elizabeth in front of a large mirror, stabbing her to death on a bed. Decades later, Megan Gordon, a shy teenage goth, moves from Los Angeles, California to a small town with her recently widowed mother Susan. In her new bedroom, Megan finds the large mirror in the corner left behind by the previous owners. Emelin, the auctioneer in charge of the house clearance, finds a cache of journals that describe the mirror's apparent possession by a demonic force able to grant wishes.

At her new school, Megan is taunted mercilessly by her peers, apart from the friendly Nikki as well as handsome, athletic Ron. Charleen, a bully running for class president against Nikki, quickly targets Megan. Meanwhile, as Megan becomes drawn to the mirror in her room, she's plagued by bizarre incidents at home; her mother's dog mysteriously dies, she's visited by a gruesome apparition of her dead father, and the mirror begins inexplicably dripping blood. Megan becomes convinced that the mirror is responsible for a series of misfortunes involving those around her, including Charleen experiencing a massive nosebleed in the cafeteria, and her teacher, Mr. Anderson, having a severe asthma attack during class.

Realizing the mirror's powers, Megan begins harnessing them herself, using them to manipulate Jeff, Charleen's love interest, into developing a crush on her instead. When Jeff stops a sexual encounter, the demon in the mirror brutally murders him before making his body disappear. The next day, Emelin attempts to retrieve the mirror from the house while Megan and Susan are gone, but her hands are mysteriously impaled, leading her to flee. When Nikki loses the student council race to Charleen, Megan harnesses the mirror's powers to scald Charleen to death in the girls' locker room showers, before killing Charleen's friend Kim in a bathroom.

Nikki becomes discomforted by Megan's change in personality, and is disturbed when Megan suggests she "helped" her usurp the class presidency. Nikki meets with Mrs. Perfili, the local real estate agent, and Emelin to inquire about the history of Megan's house and the mirror. Emelin reveals the content of the journals to Nikki, and explains that Mary Weatherford sacrificed her sister in front of the mirror decades ago hoping to appease it. After Nikki leaves, Emelin is impaled to death with a shard of glass at her antiques store.

That night, Ron is attacked by a doppelgänger of Nikki in his house and brutally murdered. After finding Ron's body, Nikki receives a phone call from Megan asking her to come to her house. Meanwhile, Susan has her hand mangled in the garbage disposal in the kitchen and bleeds to death, leading Megan to turn against the mirror. Nikki arrives armed with a dagger and attempts to shatter the mirror, but it is resistant. She and Megan attempt to flee as a torrent of wind fills the house, but are unable to escape. Megan sacrifices herself to the mirror, thus ending its reign of terror. Nikki invokes the mirror, begging it to restore things back to how they were before. She awakens in the room on the bed, dagger in hand, with Megan's corpse beneath her, in the same position as Mary Weatherford, having been subjected to an apparent time loop. The demon shows itself in the mirror before retreating, and Nikki fearfully covers it with a sheet.

== Cast ==
- Rainbow Harvest as Megan Gordon
- Karen Black as Susan Gordon
- Yvonne De Carlo as Emelin
- William Sanderson as Mr. Veze
- Kristin Dattilo as Nikki Chandler
- Ricky Paull Goldin as Ron
- Charlie Spradling as Charleen Kane
- Tom Bresnahan as Jeff
- Dorit Sauer as Kim
- Ann Hearn as Mrs. Perfili
- Stephen Tobolowsky as Mr. Anderson
- Pamela Perfili as P.E. Teacher
- Scott Campbell as Class Smart Aleck
- Traci Lee Gold as Mary Weatherworth
- Michelle Gold as Elizabeth Weatherworth

== Production ==
The film (initially titled The Black Glass) was shot in Los Angeles, and Zelda Rubenstein was originally slated to make an appearance in the film. The cast and crew were approximately sixty-percent female. The film's production company, Orphan Eyes, was based in Detroit, Michigan.

== Music ==
=== Soundtrack ===
Mirror, Mirror

Soundtrack album by Jimmy Lifton / Various artists
- Released: 1990
- Genres: Pop; rock
- Label: Orphan Records
- Producer: Virginia Perfili

A soundtrack for Mirror, Mirror was released on CD through Orphan Records in 1990. Jimmy Lifton composed and performed the movie's orchestral tracks, with the movie also featuring songs by Scott Campbell, Jim Walker, and Gene Evaro.

=== Track list ===
No.	Title	Writer(s)	Performer	Length
1.	"The Fury"	Jimmy Lifton	Jimmy Lifton	1:25
2.	"A Theme Within"	Jimmy Lifton	Jimmy Lifton	1:49
3.	"Emelin, An Introduction"	Jimmy Lifton	Jimmy Lifton	1:36
4.	"A Premonition"	Jimmy Lifton	Jimmy Lifton	1:49
5.	"Prelude to a Friend"	Jimmy Lifton	Jimmy Lifton	1:05
6.	"The Story Unfolds"	Jimmy Lifton	Jimmy Lifton	2:49
7.	"A Tail is Tolled"	Jimmy Lifton	Jimmy Lifton	0:59
8.	"Daddy"	Jimmy Lifton	Jimmy Lifton	3:12
9.	"A Sculpture Waltz"	Jimmy Lifton	Jimmy Lifton	1:50
10.	"Pages Revealed"	Jimmy Lifton	Jimmy Lifton	1:34
11.	"The Birth"	Jimmy Lifton	Jimmy Lifton	3:06
12.	"Ghosts Do Not Exist"	Jimmy Lifton	Jimmy Lifton	2:36
13.	"The Seduction"	Jimmy Lifton	Jimmy Lifton	3:06
14.	"Megan's Room"	Jimmy Lifton	Jimmy Lifton	3:08
15.	"Variation of a Changeling"	Jimmy Lifton	Jimmy Lifton	0:54
16.	"The View From Within"	Jimmy Lifton	Jimmy Lifton	1:22
17.	"The Day Is Long"	Jimmy Lifton	Jimmy Lifton	1:07
18.	"Control"	Jimmy Lifton	Jimmy Lifton	2:03
19.	"A Plan"	Jimmy Lifton	Jimmy Lifton	1:57
20.	"The Storm"	Jimmy Lifton	Jimmy Lifton	2:25
21.	"And the Door Opens"	Jimmy Lifton	Jimmy Lifton	1:52
22.	"A Theme Finale"	Jimmy Lifton	Jimmy Lifton	2:21
23.	"To the Other Side"	Jimmy Lifton	Jimmy Lifton	1:41
24.	"In My Arms"	Jim Walker	Jim Walker	2:38
25.	"Touching You At Night"	Jimmy Lifton	Jimmy Lifton	5:12
26.	"Calling Your Name"	Jimmy Lifton	Jimmy Lifton	4:10
27.	"I Am An Accident Waiting to Happen"	Scott Campbell	Scott Campbell	3:21
28.	"Oh What a Love, Oh What a Life"	Gene Evaro	Gene Evaro	4:50

== Release ==
=== Theatrical run ===
Mirror, Mirror screened theatrically at the Cannes Film Festival in May 1990, and was released theatrically in the United States on August 31 that year, having its world premiere in Detroit. The film continued to screen in the Detroit metropolitan area through September 1990. The film was given a release in the region due to the connections of its producers, who were all locals.

The film was also shown at the Chicago International Film Festival on October 19, 1990.

=== Home media ===
Academy Entertainment released Mirror, Mirror on VHS in June 1991. The film was released on DVD on October 28, 2000, by Anchor Bay Entertainment. On March 6, 2004, it was re-released as part of a four-film set featuring the film's three sequels, called the "Mirror, Mirror Collection," also by Anchor Bay. The set was packaged in a reflective foil case. Both releases are out of print. Dark Force Entertainment first released the film on 4K UHD Blu-ray in May 2024.

== Reception ==
=== Critical response ===
On the review aggregator website Rotten Tomatoes, 80% of 5 critics' reviews are positive.

Entertainment Weekly gave the film a "B−" rating. In his book Generation Multiplex, Timothy Shary called Mirror, Mirror "one of the best teen horror films in general" and citing it as an example of "the tyranny of teen popularity." Creature Features panned the film, giving it two stars and criticizing it as a "compendium of cliches." Stuart Galbraith IV of The Ann Arbor News found the film derivative and unfocused, comparing it to the "cheap exploitation horror pics of the early '70s," adding: "There is a whole pot pourri of horror movie ideas to be found in Mirror, Mirror: demons, witchcraft, possession, telekinesis—but it's as if the filmmakers just threw all those ideas into a blender."

Critic and film scholar Alexandra Heller-Nicholas praised the film in a retrospective, deeming it "one of the most exciting and fresh horror films of its era."

== Sequels ==
Mirror, Mirror was followed by three sequels, Mirror, Mirror II: Raven Dance (1994), Mirror, Mirror III: The Voyeur (1995), and Mirror, Mirror IV: Reflection (2000). Reception for the sequels was largely negative, with the Orlando Sentinel criticizing Raven Dance as "reflect[ing] poorly on [the] classic original". William Sanderson was the only actor from the first film to return for the second movie, albeit in a different role. The second film is notable for the feature film debut of Mark Ruffalo.

== Sources ==
- Shary, Timothy (2002). Generation Multiplex: The Image of Youth in Contemporary American Cinema. Austin, Texas: University of Texas Press. ISBN 978-0-292-77490-2.
- Stanley, John (2000). Creature Features: The Science Fiction, Fantasy, and Horror Movie Guide. New York City, New York: Berkley Trade. ISBN 978-0-425-17517-0.
