= Old Enough (film) =

1984 film by Marisa Silver

- Theatrical release poster
- Directed by: Marisa Silver
- Written by: Marisa Silver
- Produced by: Dina Silver
- Starring: Sarah Boyd; Rainbow Harvest; Danny Aiello; Alyssa Milano
- Cinematography: Michael Ballhaus
- Edited by: Mark Burns
- Music by: Julian Marshall
- Production company: Silver Films
- Distributed by: Orion Classics
- Release date: August 24, 1984
- Running time: 91 minutes
- Country: United States
- Language: English

Old Enough is a 1984 American comedy-drama coming-of-age film written and directed by Marisa Silver, and produced by Dina Silver. The film follows the friendship that develops over one summer between two girls from different social backgrounds.

A low-budget production, Old Enough screened at the 1984 Sundance Film Festival where it won first prize. It also marks Alyssa Milano's film debut.

== Plot ==
Eleven-year-old Lonnie and fourteen-year-old Karen live on the same street in New York’s Lower East Side, but they come from different worlds. Lonnie lives with her well-off family in an upscale townhouse with her parents and little sister Diane. Karen comes from a working-class, devoutly Catholic family that includes her father, the superintendent of their apartment building, her mother, and older brother Johnny. The two girls strike up a friendship one summer day after Lonnie sees Karen and Johnny hanging out with other neighborhood kids. The impressionable Lonnie is drawn to Karen’s older age and street-smarts, and she starts skipping out on day camp to hang out with her.

Their friendship encounters difficulties when Karen tries to blend in with Lonnie’s social environment. Lonnie invites Karen to an annual summer dance she goes to, where Karen does not fit in with the other kids. Karen steals some money from one of Lonnie’s friends, which causes a brief disagreement between the two. Their friendship is also tested when Carla, a new tenant, moves into Karen's building. Misunderstandings occur when Karen suspects her father of having an affair with Carla, but Lonnie knows the truth.

== Cast ==
- Sarah Boyd as Lonnie Sloan
- Rainbow Harvest as Karen Bruckner
- Neill Barry as Johnny Bruckner
- Danny Aiello as Mr. Bruckner
- Susan Kingsley as Mrs. Bruckner
- Alyssa Milano as Diane Sloan
- Fran Brill as Mrs. Sloan
- Gerry Bamman as Mr. Sloan
- Roxanne Hart as Carla
- Tristine Skyler as Sarah
- Al Israel as Bodega Owner

== Critical reception ==
The film received critical acclaim. In a review in Maclean's, Gerald Peary wrote "Nothing greatly consequential happens in the movie, but its strength lies in Silver’s keen observation of the girls’ telling moments in preteenage life, of how time passes when no adults are about...Silver’s first feature is vastly entertaining and an impressive debut." In another contemporary review, The New York Times' Janet Maslin wrote director Marisa Silver "has a better feeling for film making and for adolescent friendships than she does for the class differences on which the story trades."

A retrospective review from Film Inquiry said, "Above all, Old Enough is an affectionately accurate depiction of how it feels to grow into an age when the approval of your peers becomes more important than the approval of your parents. You start to choose your own friends based not just on shared interest or parent-planned playdates, but on the kind of image you imagine emulating, and who you’d most like to see reflected in yourself." In an article for Filmotomy, writer Sarah Williams wrote, "Old Enough is incredibly simple, yet it works in its ease because of how real it is. The opening Hallmark charm gives way to an honesty of how young girls look up to each other for an example, creating these close bonds for short spans of time, fitting for just that moment in life."

== Accolades ==
The film won the Grand Jury Prize at the 1984 Sundance Film Festival.

== Home media ==
The film was released on DVD in 2010 through Scorpion Records and also as a double feature with Funland in 2019. It received a restoration from Shout! Factory and was featured as part of The Criterion Channel's series "New York Stories" in September 2021.

Awards
Preceded by n/a	Sundance Grand Jury Prize: U.S. Dramatic; 1984	Succeeded by Blood Simple
