= Theresa Merritt =

American actress (1922–1998)

- Merritt in That's My Mama (1975)
- Born: September 24, 1922; Emporia, Virginia, U.S.
- Died: June 12, 1998 (aged 75); New York City, U.S.
- Occupations: Actress, singer
- Years active: 1969–1998

Theresa Merritt Hines (September 24, 1922 – June 12, 1998), known professionally as Theresa Merritt, was an American actress. She is known for her role in That's My Mama (1974–1975) and for her film roles in The Wiz (1978) and Billy Madison (1995).

== Career ==
Born in Emporia, Virginia, Merritt appeared in many theatrical productions but gained fame later in life when she starred as Ma Rainey in Ma Rainey's Black Bottom, for which she earned a Tony Award nomination, and The Wiz, in which she replaced Mabel King as Evillene. She left The Wiz, citing the role's harmful effect on her voice. She then starred in the television sitcom That's My Mama.

Merritt's other Broadway credits included Mule Bone (1991), Division Street (1980), Don't Play Us Cheap! (1972), The Crucible (1972), Trumpets of the Lord (1969), Golden Boy (1964), Tambourines to Glory (1963), and Carmen Jones (1943, 1945, 1947). She also toured with road companies of Funny Girl, Show Boat, and South Pacific.

Her most notable film roles were Aunt Em in the 1978 film version of The Wiz, Mrs. Crosby in the 1977 film adaptation of Neil Simon's The Goodbye Girl, and Juanita in the Adam Sandler comedy Billy Madison. She also appeared alongside Burt Reynolds and Dolly Parton in the film adaptation of The Best Little Whorehouse in Texas.

== Personal life and death ==
Merritt died of skin cancer on June 12, 1998, in the New York City borough of The Bronx.

== Filmography ==
Film
Year	Title	Role	Notes
1971	They Might Be Giants	Peggy	
1977	Proof of the Man	Maria	
1977	The Goodbye Girl	Mrs. Crosby	
1978	The Wiz	Aunt Em	
1979	The Great Santini	Arrabella Smalls	Alternative titles: The Ace; The Gift of Fury
1979	All That Jazz	Cast of NY / LA #4	
1982	The Best Little Whorehouse in Texas	Jewel	
1988	Astonished	Ida	
1988	The Serpent and the Rainbow	Simone	
1989	Zwei Frauen	Nurse Wilson	Alternative title: Silence Like Glass
1991	Voodoo Dawn	Madame Daslay	Alternative title: Strange Turf
1995	Billy Madison	Juanita	
1998	Dangerous Proposition	Grace	
1998	Home Fries	Mrs. Vaughan	Final film role released posthumously
Television
Year	Title	Role	Notes
1969	J.T.	Mama Meley	Television movie
1973	The Furst Family of Washington	Eloise "Mama" Furst	Television movie
1974–1975	That's My Mama	Eloise "Mama" Curtis	39 episodes
1975	Police Story	Mrs. Johnson	1 episode
1980	NBC Special Treat		1 episode
1983	The Love Boat	Faye Pillips	1 episode
1984	Concealed Enemies	Clytie Catlett	Television movie
1988	Miracle at Beekman's Place	Sarag Coleman	Television movie
1997	Law & Order	Ruth Titus	1 episode
1997	Sesame Street	Grandma Sarah	1 episode
1998	NYPD Blue	Bernice	1 episode
1998	Cosby	Edna Stone	1 episode

== Awards and nominations ==
Year	Award	Category	Work	Result	Ref.
1985	Tony Award	Best Featured Actress in a Play	Ma Rainey's Black Bottom	Nominated	
