= The Sillies =

American punk rock band

The Sillies were a Detroit punk rock band formed by auto assembly line worker Ben Waugh. The Sillies played their first show second-billed to The MC5. Later, they played with bands such as The Dead Boys, English rock band The Damned, The Cramps, and toured the United States and Canada. The band regrouped and toured the West Coast of North America in 2002 to support the release of their "debut" CD America's Most Wanton (Nebula/Scooch Pooch).
