= William Sanderson =

American actor

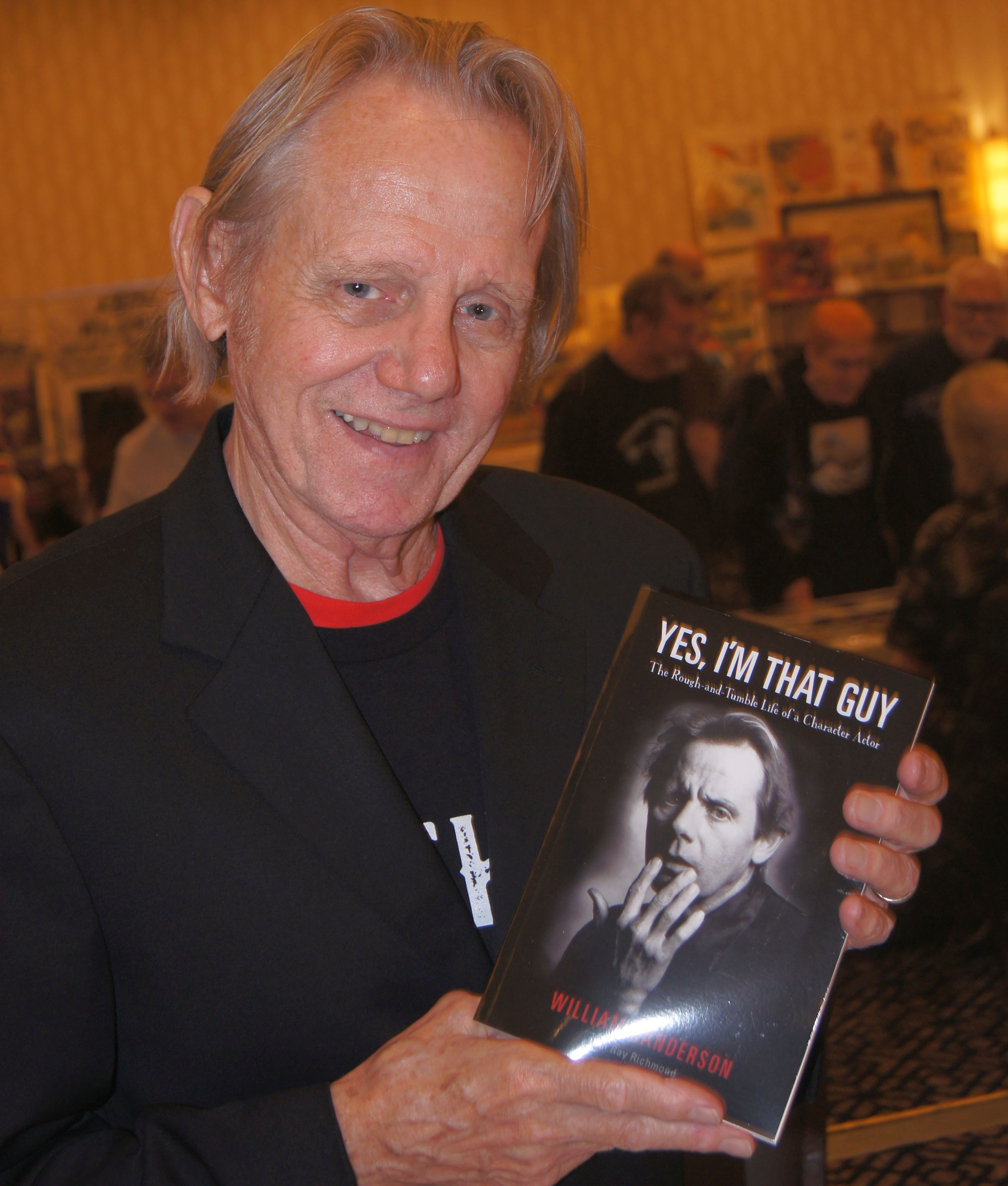
- Sanderson in 2019
- Born: January 10, 1944 (age 82); Memphis, Tennessee, U.S.
- Occupation: Actor
- Years active: 1976–2020
- Spouse: Sharon Sanderson (m. 1993)
- Children: 1

William Sanderson (born January 10, 1944) is an American retired actor. He played J. F. Sebastian in the feature film Blade Runner (1982) and had regular roles on several television series, playing Larry on Newhart (1982–1990), E. B. Farnum on Deadwood (2004–2006, 2019), and Sheriff Bud Dearborne on True Blood (2008–2010, 2012).

== Early life ==
Sanderson was born in Memphis, Tennessee on January 10, 1944 to an elementary school teacher mother and a landscape designer father. He is a graduate of Memphis Central High School.

Sanderson volunteered for the U.S. Army when he was 18 years old in 1962. After his discharge, he attended college using the G.I. Bill, first at Southern Methodist University for a year, then at Memphis State University. He earned a B.B.A. (1968) and J.D. (1971) degrees there, though he did not take the bar exam.

In a 1972 episode of To Tell the Truth, Sanderson described himself as "a full-time bartender ... and a part-time actor."

== Career ==
Sanderson appeared in many science fiction films, as one of the mechanics and regulars of the diner in The Rocketeer, who defies Nazi agents looking for the top secret rocket pack. As a single episode character, Deuce, in the television show Babylon 5 later reprised the role in Babylon 5: Thirdspace. Sanderson voiced Dr. Karl Rossum in Batman: The Animated Series.

Sanderson starred in the 1977 blacksploitation thriller Fight for Your Life, which is banned in the United Kingdom. He played the key supporting role of timid, genius inventor J. F. Sebastian in Ridley Scott's 1982 sci-fi-noir film Blade Runner.

As a guest, he made appearances in many television shows; his credits include The Pretender, The X-Files, Knight Rider, Married... with Children, Babylon 5, ER, Coach, and Walker, Texas Ranger. He plays a key role in an audio dramatization of Ursula K. Le Guin's Vaster than Empires and More Slow in NPR's 2000X series. In 2001, Sanderson played the courageous bartender Dewey in the TNT film Crossfire Trail.

Sanderson's fame peaked in a comic-relief role, as the soiled, societally awkward, backwoodsman Larry in Newhart from 1982 to 1990, famous for the absurd catchphrase, "Hi. I'm Larry. This is my brother Darryl. This is my other brother Darryl" – a reoccurring character until the end of the second season, when he and his brothers purchased the cafe next to the Stratford Inn.

Sanderson had a minor role as the abusive and cruel junkyard dealer Ray in Man's Best Friend.

He returned to television playing E. B. Farnum in the HBO television series Deadwood from 2004 to 2006, later reprising the role in its film continuation. In 2008, Sanderson joined the cast of True Blood, playing Sheriff Bud Dearborne. He played Oldham, the resident interrogation expert of the DHARMA Initiative in an episode of the fifth season of the ABC series Lost.

In May 2019, Sanderson released an autobiography about his career, Yes, I'm That Guy: The Rough-and-Tumble Life of a Character Actor. Following the release of his book, Sanderson and Nick "Saucey" Katsouros released a six-episode limited-run podcast, Sanderson Says, to discuss and expound on the autobiography.

Sanderson announced his retirement from acting on his Facebook page on May 13, 2020.

== Personal life ==
Sanderson lives in Harrisburg, Pennsylvania, with his wife. He has one son, Andrew Sanderson, and two grandchildren, William and Jaxon Sanderson, who live in Wake Forest, North Carolina.

== Filmography ==
Year	Title	Role	Notes
1977	Fight for Your Life	Jessie Lee Kane	
1977	Proof of the Man	Gun Dealer	
1978	Blue Nude	Guy In Next Cell	Uncredited
1979	The Onion Field	Young Con	
1979	Savage Weekend	Otis	
1980	Coal Miner's Daughter	Lee Dollarhide	
1980	Seed of Innocence	Randy Webb	
1981	Death Hunt	Ned Warren	
1981	Raggedy Man	Calvin	
1982	The Ballad of Gregorio Cortez	Cowboy	
1982	Blade Runner	J.F. Sebastian	
1983	Lone Wolf McQuade	"Snow"	
1983	Nightmares	Gas Station Attendant	Segment: "Terror in Topanga"; uncredited
1984	City Heat	Lonnie Ash	
1985	Fletch	Jim Swarthout	
1986	Black Moon Rising	Tyke Thayden	
1987	Last Man Standing	Casper	
1987	Dead Aim	Brennan	
1989	Thunderground	"Ratman"	
1989	Deadly Weapon	Reverend Smith	
1990	Mirror, Mirror	Mr. Veze	
1991	The Giant of Thunder Mountain	Percey Crow	
1991	The Rocketeer	"Skeets"	
1993	Skeeter	Gordon Perry	
1993	Man's Best Friend	Ray	
1994	Mirror, Mirror II: Raven Dance	Roger	
1994	The Client	FBI Agent Wally Boxx	
1994	Wagons East	Zeke	
1995	Hologram Man	Manny "Giggles" O'Donnell	
1995	Phoenix	Miro	
1996	Last Man Standing	Joe Monday, The Bartender	
1996	Forest Warrior	Paul Carpio	
1996	The Utilizer	Leek	
1997	Critics and Other Freaks	Chef Bernie	
1999	Nice Guys Sleep Alone	Rufus	
2000	Stanley's Gig	Stanley Myer	
2000	Stageghost	Jack Butler	
2001	Dying on the Edge	Tommy	
2002	Monkey Love	Bradley Chalmers	
2002	Never Get Outta the Boat	Clarence	
2003	Gods and Generals	General A. P. Hill	
2003	The Low Budget Time Machine	The Prospector	
2004	Promised Land	Clark	
2004	Avatar	Riley	
2005	Wit's End	Jedediah Cross	
2006	Disappearances	Muskrat "Rat" Kinneson	
2006	Beyond the Wall of Sleep	Joe Slaader	
2006	The Treasure of Painted Forest	Paul	
2008	Pretty Ugly People	Sam	
2014	A Merry Friggin' Christmas	Father Juge	
2018	The Griddle House	Gus	

=== Television ===
Year	Title	Role	Notes
1976	The Other Side of Victory	Oakley	Television film
1979	Starsky & Hutch	"Weirdo"	Episode: "Starsky vs. Hutch"
1980	Scared Straight! Another Story	Harlan	Television film
1980	The Dukes of Hazzard	Russ Collins	Episode: "Mrs. Roscoe P. Coltrane"
1980–1981	Palmerstown, U.S.A.	Merwin Noon / Henry Redmond	2 episodes
1981	Walking Tall	Stacy	Episode: "The Protectors of the People"
1982–1990	Newhart	Larry	91 episodes
1982	Bret Maverick	Kenneth Broomick	Episode: "Hallie"
1982	Quincy, M.E.	Willie McCracken	Episode: "Guns Don't Die"
1982	The Executioner's Song	Gibbs	Television film; uncredited
1982	Knight Rider	The Reverend	Episode: "Trust Doesn't Rust"
1983	Who Will Love My Children?	Cleve Shelby	Television film
1983	It Takes Two	Earl	Episode: "Instinct"
1983	Women of San Quentin	"Countee"	Television film
1985	Streets of Justice	"Weasel"	Television film
1986	The Defiant Ones	Mason	Television film
1986	Dalton: Code of Vengeance II	Bobby Fuller	Television film
1987	The Man Who Broke 1,000 Chains	Trump	Television film
1988	The Twilight Zone	Norman Blane	Episode: "The Call"
1989	Lonesome Dove	"Lippy" Jones	Miniseries; 4 episodes
1991	Sometimes They Come Back	Carl Mueller (age 44)	Television film
1991	Married... with Children	Cousin Eb	Episode: "Buck Has a Belly Ache"
1992	Dangerous Curves	Bobby Havens	Episode: "Auld Lang Syne"
1992	Mann & Machine	Dr. William Unzer	Episode: "Cold, Cold Heart"
1992	The Young Riders	Emmett Barnett	Episode: "The Debt"
1992–1994	Batman: The Animated Series	Dr. Karl Rossum	Voice, 4 episodes
1993	Sirens	Male Store Owner	Episode: "Keeping the Peace"
1993	Ned Blessing: The Story of My Life and Times	Unknown	Episode: "The Smink Brothers"
1993	Return to Lonesome Dove	"Lippy" Jones	Miniseries; 4 episodes
1994	Matlock	Mickey Sanders	Episode: "The Crook"
1994	Babylon 5	"Deuce"	Episode: "Grail"
1994	The X-Files	Edward Funsch	Episode: "Blood"
1995	Siringo	Tully	Television film
1995	The Marshal	Philbrick	Episode: "The Heartbreak Kid"
1995	Santo Bugito	Clem	Voice, episode: "My Name Is Revenge"
1995–1997	Aaahh!!! Real Monsters	Otis, Janitor	Voice, 2 episodes
1996	Andersonville	Munn	Television film
1996	The Pretender	Roy Abbot	Episode: "Every Picture Tells a Story"
1996	ER	Mr. Percy	Episode: "No Brain, No Gain"
1996–1999	Jumanji	Professor J.S. Ibsen	Voice, 14 episodes
1996–2001	Walker, Texas Ranger	Will Stanton / Mayor	3 episodes
1997	Coach	Jesse / Larry	3 episodes
1997	George Wallace	T.Y. Odum	Television film
1997	Cow and Chicken	Cowboy	Voice, episode: "School Bully/Time Machine"
1997	George and Leo	Unknown	Episode: "The Cameo Episode"
1998	The Practice	Mr. Simmons	Episode: "Rhyme and Reason"
1998	Babylon 5: Thirdspace	"Deuce"	Television film
1998	Maximum Bob	Dicky Crowe	5 episodes
1998	The Angry Beavers	Ditto Otto / Clerk	Voice, episode: "If You Insisters/Alley Oops!"
1999	L.A. Heat	The Monk	Episode: "The Monk"
2000	Miracle on the Mountain: The Kincaid Family Story	Helicopter Pilot	Television film
2000	Resurrection Blvd.	Clancy, The Illegal Gun Dealer	Episode: "Suenos"
2000	Psyko Ferret	Stan Veinous	Voice, television film
2001	Crossfire Trail	Dewey	Television film
2002	Dharma & Greg	Mike	Episode: "The Tooth Is Out There"
2003	Monte Walsh	"Skimpy" Eagens	Television film
2003	Without a Trace	Wally Sykes	Episode: "Kam Li"
2004	Monk	Joshua Skinner	Episode: "Mr. Monk Gets Married"
2004–2006	Deadwood	E. B. Farnum	36 episodes
2007	Life	Holt Easley	Episode: "What They Saw"
2008–2012	True Blood	Sheriff Bud Dearborne	22 episodes
2009	Lost	Oldham	Episode: "He's Our You"
2009	Trauma	Captain Edward Smith	Episode: "Blue Balloon"
2010	Tim and Eric Awesome Show, Great Job!	Jim	Episode: "Choices"
2011	Criminal Minds: Suspect Behavior	Leonard Keane	Episode: "Nighthawk"
2011	Mike & Molly	Dennis	2 episodes
2011	Bar Karma	James	12 episodes
2012	Bones	Norbert Mobley	Episode: "The Family in the Feud"
2013	Bravest Warriors	Alien Perkalus	Voice, episode: "Mexican Touchdown"
2019	American Gods	The Bookkeeper	Episode: "The Greatest Story Ever Told"
2019	Deadwood: The Movie	E. B. Farnum	Television film
