= Are You Afraid of the Dark? (book series) =

1995 book series

Are You Afraid of the Dark? is a book series that is based on the television series of the same name. This book series was created in 1995. The first book was written by John Peel, who later wrote three more books in the series.

Only two books from the series, The Tale of Cutter's Treasure and The Tale of the Nightly Neighbors, were actually adapted from episodes of the TV series, and each has the same title as the episode on which it was based.

The first six books in the series have covers that are illustrated with a single photo of the face of a surprised or frightened child. The one exception to this is the cover of book number two, The Tale of Cutter's Treasure, as in addition to the photo of a child's frightened face, it also includes stills from the TV episode on which the book is based. The covers of the later books follow a completely different style and layout, with each featuring an illustration that is directly related to the story within.

== List of books in the series ==
No.	Title	Author	Date	Narrator	Notes
1	The Tale of the Sinister Statues	John Peel	March 1995	Gary	Original novel
2	The Tale of Cutter's Treasure	David L. Seidman	May 1995	Gary & Frank	Novelization of Season 4, Episode 4
3	The Tale of the Restless House	John Peel	July 1995	Samantha	Original novel
4	The Tale of the Nightly Neighbors	Kathleen Derby & D.J. MacHale	September 1995	Betty Ann	Novelization of Season 1, Episode 8
5	The Tale of the Secret Mirror	Brad & Barbara Strickland	November 1995	Kiki	Original novel
6	The Tale of the Phantom School Bus	Brad & Barbara Strickland	January 1996	Tucker	Original novel
7	The Tale of the Ghost Riders	John Vornholt	July 1996	Gary	Original novel
8	The Tale of the Deadly Diary	Brad & Barbara Strickland	July 1996	Betty Ann	Original novel
9	The Tale of the Virtual Nightmare	Ted Pederson	September 1996	Gary	Original novel
10	The Tale of the Curious Cat	Diana G. Gallagher	November 1996	Betty Ann	Original novel
11	The Tale of the Zero Hero	John Peel	January 1997		Original novel
12	The Tale of the Shimmering Shell	David Cody Weiss & Bobbi JG Weiss	March 1997	Samantha	Original novel
13	The Tale of the Three Wishes	John Peel	May 1997	Frank	Original novel
14	The Tale of the Campfire Vampires	Clayton Emery	July 1997	Tucker	Original novel
15	The Tale of the Bad-Tempered Ghost	V. E. Mitchell	September 1997	Kiki	Original novel
16	The Tale of the Souvenir Shop	Alice Eve Cohen	November 1997	Betty Ann	Original novel
17	The Tale of the Ghost Cruise	David Cody Weiss & Bobbi JG Weiss	January 1998	Gary	Original novel
18	The Tale of the Pulsating Gate	Diana G. Gallagher	March 1998	Gary	Original novel
19	The Tale of the Stalking Shadow	David Cody Weiss & Bobbi JG Weiss	May 1998	Samantha	Original novel
20	The Tale of the Egyptian Mummies	Mark Mitchell	July 1998	Frank	Original novel
21	The Tale of the Terrible Toys	Richard Lee Byers	September 1998	Tucker	Original novel
22	The Tale of the Mogul Monster	David Cody Weiss & Bobbi JG Weiss	November 1998	Tucker	Original novel
23	The Tale of the Horrifying Hockey Team	K. S. Rodriguez	January 1999	Frank	Original novel
