= Annette Cascone =

American author and screenwriter

Annette Cascone is an American author and screenwriter. She lives in New Jersey.

== Works ==
Along with her sister Gina Cascone, she is the author of the Deadtime Stories series of middle-grade horror books, originally published under the name A.C. Cascone. She has written the several episodes of the Nickelodeon TV series, based on the books. She is also the screenwriter (along with Gina Cascone) of the 1990 feature film Mirror, Mirror.

== Books ==
- Deadtime Stories: Terror in Tiny Town (1996, 2013) (Originally as by A.C. Cascone)
- Deadtime Stories: Invasion of the Appleheads (1996, 2013) (Originally as by A.C. Cascone)
- Deadtime Stories: Along Came a Spider (1996, 2013) (Originally as by A.C. Cascone)
- Deadtime Stories: Ghost Knight (1996, 2013) (Originally as by A.C. Cascone)
- Deadtime Stories: Revenge of the Goblins (1996, 2013) (Originally as by A.C. Cascone)
- Deadtime Stories: Little Magic Shop of Horrors (1996, 2013) (Originally as by A.C. Cascone)
- Deadtime Stories: It Came from the Deep (1997, 2014) (Originally as by A.C. Cascone)
- Deadtime Stories: Grave Secrets (1997, 2012) (Originally as by A.C. Cascone)
- Deadtime Stories: Grandpa's Monster Movies (1997, 2012) (Originally as by A.C. Cascone)
- Deadtime Stories: Nightmare on Planet X (1997, 2014) (Originally as by A.C. Cascone)
- Deadtime Stories: Welcome to the Terror-Go-Round (1997) (as by A.C. Cascone)
- Deadtime Stories: The Beast of Baskerville (1997, 2012) (Originally as by A.C. Cascone)
- Deadtime Stories: Cyber Scare (1997) (as by A.C. Cascone)
- Deadtime Stories: Night of the Pet Zombies (1997) (as by A.C. Cascone)
- Deadtime Stories: Faerie Tale (1997, 2014) (Originally as by A.C. Cascone)
