= Spinetinglers =

Series of middle grade horror novels

Spinetinglers is a series of 30 standalone middle-grade horror novels, written by multiple authors and published under the pseudonym, M.T. Coffin.

The series was created by author George Edward Stanley, under the pen name M.T. Coffin, a play on the words "empty coffin". Stanley wrote many original books for children as well as entries in the long-running Hardy Boys and Nancy Drew series. Some of the other ghost writers would go on to gain large reputations in the writing world, including Jim DeFelice, who cowrote the book American Sniper, and Kathleen Duey, author of the American Diaries and Hoofbeats series for young readers.

Spinetinglers followed a similar format to R. L. Stine's Goosebumps, with most books being standalone stories around 150 pages in length involving children encountering ghosts, monsters, and aliens. The series was published by Avon Camelot (an imprint of Avon) from 1995-1998, and is now out of print.

== Books in the series ==
1. The Substitute Creature (March 1995) (Kathleen Duey) - Elementary students Jace and Abram begin to suspect that their new substitute teacher Mr. Hiss is an extraterrestrial after a series of bizarre events, including him spreading blood on his hands and face in the men's room.

2. Billy Baker's Dog Won't Stay Buried (April 1995) (George Edward Stanley) - When Billy's dog bites a nasty neighbor and is put down in retaliation, Billy firmly believes his pet is not gone for good, which proves to be correct as the animal returns from the grave with an army of undead canine companions.

3. My Teacher's a Bug (May 1995) (Robert Hawks) - Ryan and his family move to Texas for his father's new job, and when he is put on new allergy medication, Ryan becomes able to see his teachers for what they are: overgrown insects plotting a total takeover.

4. Where Have All the Parents Gone? (July 1995) (George Edward Stanley) - When the parents of Broxton begin to go missing, some kids and teenagers react by having fun. Others set out to uncover the truth, and discover a secret alien invasion going on.

5. Check It Out-And Die! (September 1995) (George Edward Stanley) - Charlie and Dustin are initially happy that their new school librarian has been stocking the library with horror stories but soon discover that their fellow students are vanishing, and the stories are coming to life.

6. Simon Says, Croak! (November 1995) (Kathleen Duey) - Alexander has moved to a new town and a new school and begins to receive messages from the deceased former owner of the desk in his classroom.

7. Snow Day (December 1995) (Robert Hawks) - A group of students face terror when their school bus is caught in a raging snowstorm and they are forced to seek shelter at a sinister-looking abandoned farm.

8. Don't Go to the Principal's Office (March 1996) (George Edward Stanley) - Mr. Amsted is the new principal at Crosswell Elementary School, and Richard and Ted begin to suspect that something is up when the students sent to his office undergo a complete personality change and possibly from being lobotomized.

9. Step on a Crack (May 1996) (C. J. Henderson) - The sidewalks are cracking, there are strange fragrances and mysterious growls in the air, and only one kid can find evidence that any of this is out of the ordinary.

10. The Dead Kid Did It (June 1996) (George Edward Stanley) - Dunning comes face to face with a pranking ghost who is framing him for the ghost's actions.

11. Fly by Night (July 1996) (Kathleen Duey) - The crows in town are acting strangely, and Ty believes old Mrs. Crow may know something about it.

12. Killer Computer (August 1996) (Bob Hirschfeld) - Jenny and her younger brother Brian encounter a monstrous creature that wants to escape from cyberspace and into the real world, bringing its deadly games with it.

13. Pet Store (September 1996) (George Edward Stanley) - Amber and her family move to a new town, but Amber soon finds out the dogs are really in charge, while the humans are their pets.

14. Blood Red EightBall (October 1996) (Jim DeFelice) - Craig gets pulled into a pool-themed virtual reality game, where he soon finds that the Eight Ball is not like normal ones, but rather as evil.

15. Escape from the Haunted Museum (November 1996) (George Edward Stanley) - Trapped in a museum overnight, Tony and his friends discover that the exhibits come to life during the late hours.

16. We Wish You a Scary Christmas (December 1996) (George Edward Stanley) - A pair of kids discover that their neighbors are holding an amnesiac Santa Claus in their home.

17. The Monster Channel (January 1997) (Jim Simon) - Charley discovers a spooky old television in the attic of his new home, which only has one channel - the Monster Channel, which begins releasing monsters into the real world.

18. Mirror, Mirror (February 1997) (Kathleen Duey) - Jake thinks it is great that the reflection in his spoon can talk to him, but soon finds out that the "reflection" is an evil creature.

19. Boogey's Back for Blood (March 1997) (Michael Vlessides) - When he finds a mysterious old tome, Mike Jacobs accidentally reawakens the evil Boogeyman from his four-century slumber.

20. Lights, Camera, Die! (April 1997) (Mike Ford) - Mr. Faust runs the Oddity Theater, playing horror films day and night, but soon turns out that he is trapping kids, invited as special guests, in the movies.

21. Camp Crocodile (May 1997) (Jim DeFelice) - A summer camp turns out to be more than it seems when a giant crocodile begins targeting the kids.

22. Student Exchange (June 1997) (Mike Ford) - Something weird is going on at Westview Elementary School, as James discovers when one of his classmates disappears and a mysterious boy turns up wearing the same pendant as the odd new kid Marilyn.

23. Gimme Back My Brain (July 1997) (Robert Hawks) - Max encounters a pair of mad scientists who are creating a super robot and want to use his brain as the final piece. At first, he thinks his new robotic body is great, but soon finds out that no one believes it is him, and the scientists are out to bring him under their total control.

24. Your Turn - To Scream (August 1997) (Kathleen Duey) - Michael gets sucked into a mysterious board game, and must play his way through assorted dangers to escape.

25. The Curse of the Cheerleaders (September 1997) (George Edward Stanley) - The cheerleaders at Lincoln Elementary School have developed the ability to hypnotize people, and are using their new powers to take control of others for their sinister purposes.

26. Wear and Scare (October 1997) (Kathleen Duey) - Sam and his friends are preparing for a school event and rent Halloween costumes from creepy old Mr. Slithern, only to find that the costumes are much more than they seem.

27. Lizard People (November 1997) (Jim DeFelice) - Michael gets caught in an alternate world where everyone, including himself, is now a lizard person instead of a human and must try to escape.

28. Circus F.R.E.A.K.S. (December 1997) (George Edward Stanley) - Charlie and Jeanna decide to dress up as freaks for the school circus play, but they find themselves in a great danger when a real circus comes to town with some real freaks.

29. My Dentist Is a Vampire (January 1998) (Jim DeFelice) - Brian's new dentist is Dr. Van, whose office turns out to be a house of horror, home to bloodsuckers of all kinds, including Dr. Van himself.

30. Saber-Toothed Tiger (February 1998) (Jim DeFelice) - The neighbor of Alan Evans goes missing after Alan sees a trio of menacing-looking cats outside the neighbor's home. Now, the cats are after Alan, and he must fight back by taking feline form himself.
