= Spooksville =

Children's book series by Christopher Pike

Spooksville is a series of 24 children's horror fiction books by American writer Christopher Pike. All 24 books were first published between 1995 and 1998. The series is set in a remote town in the USA and revolves around the lives of five of its young inhabitants. Although intended for a younger audience than his adult and young adult literature, they contain some violence and may be considered unsuitable for younger children. A television series based on the books was commissioned and premiered on October 26, 2013, on the Hub Network.

== Plot ==
The Spooksville novellas centre around a group of friends in their bizarre home town that is host to a wide array of supernatural and unexplained occurrences. The plots of the books often revolve around inter-dimensional travel, extraterrestrial life, interstellar travel, and time travel, as well as the fictional histories of the lost continents of Mu/Lemuria and Atlantis, magic, and a variety of other supernatural forces and entities. The group is caught between exploring the town and escaping trouble and saving the town from the forces of darkness. Although the books are chronological they differ in their relevance to previous stories, there are recurring characters out with the group, as well as recurring places and themes, and the books are not intended as stand alone, but they may feasibly be read in a different order than below.

== Characters ==
The main characters throughout the series are five young friends: Adam Freeman, the leader; Watch, the brains; and Sara "Sally" Wilcox, the realist, and they are the only characters to appear in all 24 novels. Cindy Makey appears in the second novella and remains for the rest of the series. As the series progresses the character Bryce Poole is involved more and more and eventually the five young friends become a solid group. Other characters appear frequently, two most notably: the town witch, Ann Templeton, of whom the main characters have differing opinions; and Bum, the friendly and knowledgeable homeless ex-mayor of Spooksville. Both Ann Templeton and Bum help the main characters, usually in the form of information, but sometimes taking a more active role in helping defend the town. George Sanders and Tira Jones are also friends of the main group, but only participate in a few adventures, and are not focused on. Mr. Patton, the owner of Spooksville's army surplus store, appears in a few stories, arming and assisting the group with weapons and explosives. In almost every novella, the group befriends some sort of person or creature who they either assist, or who assists them through the course of the story.

== Books ==
1. The Secret Path: Newcomer Adam meets Sally and Watch and gets his first taste of how weird his new home is.
2. The Howling Ghost: The trio searches for a young boy being held hostage by a ghost.
3. The Haunted Cave: The four kids become trapped in a cave that closes by itself and must find a way out or risk being trapped in it forever.
4. Aliens in the Sky: The kids get kidnapped by aliens.
5. The Cold People: Ancient cryonically frozen Atlantians attack the town.
6. The Witch's Revenge: The kids visit Ann's castle and become trapped in it.
7. The Dark Corner: Adam, Sally, and Watch visit The Secret Path again to rescue Bryce Poole and find themselves in a different alternate Spooksville.
8. The Little People (reprinted as Pan's Realm): A herd of magical creatures invade Spooksville.
9. The Wishing Stone: The group learns the dangers of wishing when they find a mysterious stone with wish granting powers.
10. The Wicked Cat: Misfortune follows a cat the kids find.
11. The Deadly Past: A doorway to the past opens and unleashes dinosaurs and flying reptiles upon the town.
12. The Hidden Beast: The kids go on a treasure hunt, but must make it past a dragon.
13. Creature in the Teacher (published as Alien Invasion in the UK): School has begun, but they suspect that their new teacher is a monster.
14. The Evil House: The kids become trapped in a cursed house on Halloween which turns them into their costumes.
15. Invasion of the No Ones: Energy-based extradimensional beings crossover into Spooksville, and begin to possess people.
16. Time Terror: The kids discover a wind-up toy that allows them to travel through time.
17. The Thing in the Closet: It is a bad time for bed when Cindy is kidnapped by a closet monster.
18. Attack of the Killer Crabs: Giant crabs attack the beach.
19. Night of the Vampire: A gang of vampires invade the town and the only way to stop them is to defeat the queen.
20. The Dangerous Quest: Someone has cast a wicked spell on Watch, and the only way to save him is to journey into another dimension.
21. The Living Dead (also published as Return of the Dead): The kids must fight off zombies that rise from the cemetery.
22. The Creepy Creature: A blob monster from the woods assumes the form of whoever it devours.
23. Phone Fear: A mysterious voice starts calling the kids over the phone, demanding they do what he says, or else.
24. The Witch's Gift: Ann calls the kids over to her castle, announcing her plans to leave.

The books were published in the UK by Hodder Children's Books and in the US by Pocket Books.
