= Gina Cascone =

American author and screenwriter

Gina Cascone is an American author and screenwriter.

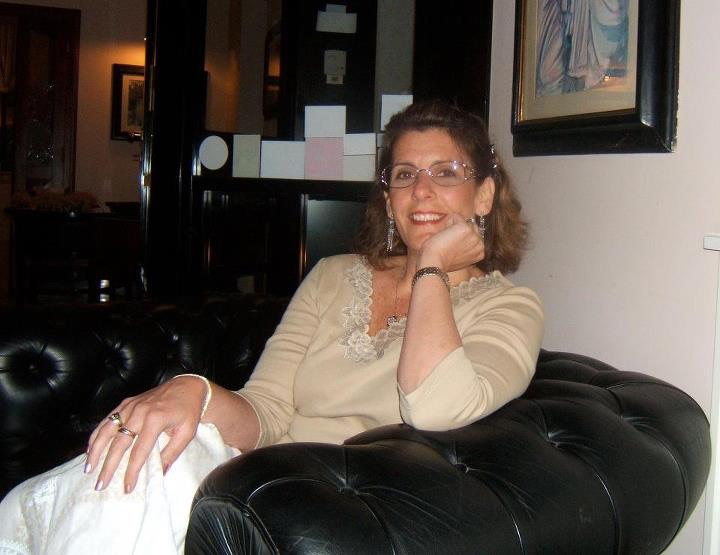

== Works ==
Gina Cascone is an author and TV script writer. She has written two memoirs; Pagan Babies and Other Catholic Memories, a child's eye view of her years in Catholic school, and Life al Dente: Laughter and Love in an Italian American Family. She has been a syndicate writer for 17th Street, Parachute Press, and other series books for young readers. She has also co-authored teen thrillers, and a satire of Cliffs Notes with her sister Annette Cascone. Gina and Annette also wrote the Deadtime Stories series of middle-grade chillers, originally published under the name A.C. Cascone. The sisters also wrote several episodes of the Nickelodeon TV series, based on the books. She is also the screenwriter (along with Annette Cascone) of the 1990 feature film, Mirror, Mirror. Gina has also written two picture books with her daughter, Bryony Williams Sheppard, for Sleeping Bear Press; Around the World Right Now and Unicorn Yoga.

== Books ==
=== Deadtime Stories ===
- Deadtime Stories: Terror in Tiny Town (1996, 2013) (Originally as by A.C. Cascone)
- Deadtime Stories: Invasion of the Appleheads (1996, 2013) (Originally as by A.C. Cascone)
- Deadtime Stories: Along Came a Spider (1996, 2013) (Originally as by A.C. Cascone)
- Deadtime Stories: Ghost Knight (1996, 2013) (Originally as by A.C. Cascone)
- Deadtime Stories: Revenge of the Goblins (1996, 2013) (Originally as by A.C. Cascone)
- Deadtime Stories: Little Magic Shop of Horrors (1996, 2013) (Originally as by A.C. Cascone)
- Deadtime Stories: It Came from the Deep (1997, 2014) (Originally as by A.C. Cascone)
- Deadtime Stories: Grave Secrets (1997, 2012) (Originally as by A.C. Cascone)
- Deadtime Stories: Grandpa's Monster Movies (1997, 2012) (Originally as by A.C. Cascone)
- Deadtime Stories: Nightmare on Planet X (1997, 2014) (Originally as by A.C. Cascone)
- Deadtime Stories: Welcome to the Terror-Go-Round (1997) (as by A.C. Cascone)
- Deadtime Stories: The Beast of Baskerville (1997, 2012) (Originally as by A.C. Cascone)
- Deadtime Stories: Cyber Scare (1997) (as by A.C. Cascone)
- Deadtime Stories: Night of the Pet Zombies (1997) (as by A.C. Cascone)
- Deadtime Stories: Faerie Tale (1997, 2014) (Originally as by A.C. Cascone)

=== Other books ===
- Unicorn Yoga, Sleeping Bear Press, 2020
- Around the World Right Now, Sleeping Bear Press, 2017
- Life Al Dente: Laughter and Love in an Italian-American Family, Simon & Schuster, 2003
- There's No Place Like Home, Troll Communications, 1997
- If He Hollers, Avon Books, 1995
- In a Crooked Little House, Troll Communications, 1994
- Pagan Babies: and Other Catholic Memories, St. Martin’s Press, 1982
- Jump off the Cliff Notes, Bart Books, 1988
- Mother's Little Helper, St. Martin’s Press, 1986

== Sources ==
- www.CasconeSheppard.com
- www.GinaCascone.com
