= Dennis McCarthy (composer) =

American composer of television and film scores

- Born: July 3, 1945 (age 81); United States
- Genres: Film score, television score
- Occupations: Composer, arranger

Dennis McCarthy (born July 3, 1945) is an American composer of television and film scores. His soundtrack credits include several entries in the Star Trek franchise, including underscores for The Next Generation, Deep Space Nine, Voyager, Enterprise, and the 1994 feature film Star Trek Generations. His other television credits include Dynasty, V, MacGyver, Sliders, Dawson's Creek, and Project Greenlight. He also produced the album Ol' Yellow Eyes Is Back by Brent Spiner also from Star Trek, and composed music for stage productions.

McCarthy has won 18 ASCAP awards and a Primetime Emmy Award for his theme on Deep Space Nine, in addition to nine Emmy nominations for his various Star Trek-related work. He also shares one Emmy for his music direction for the 63rd Academy Awards.

== Filmography ==
=== Feature films ===
Year	Title	Director	Notes
1982	Pray TV	Robert Markowitz	
1983	Off the Wall	Rick Friedberg	
1983	The Kid with the 200 I.Q.	Leslie H. Martinson	
1983	Last Plane Out	David Nelson	
1986	Gone to Texas	Peter Levin	
1990	Kaleidoscope	Jud Taylor	
1991	Daddy	Michael Miller	
1992	Aladdin	Ron Clements; John Musker	Additional music Score composed by Alan Menken
1994	Tonya and Nancy: The Inside Story	Larry Shaw	
1994	Star Trek Generations	David Carson	
1995	The Colony	Rob Hedden	
1996	Lying Eyes	Marina Sargenti	
1997	Love's Deadly Triangle	Richard A. Colla	
1997	McHale's Navy	Bryan Spicer	
1997	When Innocence Is Lost	Bethany Rooney	
1997	Breast Men	Lawrence O'Neil	
1998	Letters from a Killer	David Carson	
1999	Ultimate Deception	Richard A. Colla	
1999	Having Our Say: The Delany Sisters' First 100 Years	Lynne Littman	
2000	In His Life: The John Lennon Story	David Carson	
2001	Conspiracy	Frank Pierson	
2002	The Scorpion King	Chuck Russell	Additional music Score composed by John Debney
2003	Die, Mommie, Die!	Mark Rucker	
2004	Landers	Sean Findley	
2007	A Modern Twain Story: The Prince and the Pauper	James Quattrochi	
2018	Death of a Nation	Dinesh D'Souza; Bruce Schooley	Documentary film

=== Television ===
Year	Title	Notes
1969–71	The Glen Campbell Goodtime Hour	Musical director; 5 episodes
1980	Barbara Mandrell and the Mandrell Sisters	Musical director; 3 episodes
1980–81	Enos	17 episodes
1982	Private Benjamin	2 episodes
1983	Gun Shy	6 episodes
1983	Small & Frye	6 episodes
1983	The Fall Guy	Episode: "To The Finish"
1983	Cutter to Houston	3 episodes
1983–84	Goodnight, Beantown	2 episodes
1984	V: The Final Battle	2 parts
1984	Glitter	Episode: "Illusions"
1984–85	V	19 episodes
1985	Stir Crazy	2 episodes
1985	Cover Up	Episode: "Black Widow"
1985–87	The Colbys	13 episodes
1985–87	Hotel	2 episodes
1985-89	Dynasty	29 episodes
1985–91	MacGyver	69 episodes
1986	The Twilight Zone	3 episodes
1986	The New Mike Hammer	Episode: "Murder in the Cards"
1986	The Love Boat	Episode: "The Shipshape Cruise"
1986	Trapper John, M.D.	4 episodes
1987–88	Houston Knights	20 episodes
1987–94	Star Trek: The Next Generation	88 episodes Nominated–Primetime Emmy Award for Outstanding Music Composition for a Series (5)
1989	Island Son	Episode: "Everyday People"
1989	Falcon Crest	Episode: "Enquiring Minds"
1990	Tiny Toon Adventures	2 episodes
1990–93	Parker Lewis Can't Lose	73 episodes
1991	Eddie Dodd	6 episodes
1991	63rd Academy Awards	Television special
1992	Beverly Hills, 90210	Episode: "Baby Makes Five"
1994	Burke's Law	4 episodes
1994	Birdland	7 episodes
1995	Sliders	2 episodes
1993–99	Star Trek: Deep Space Nine	77 episodes Primetime Emmy Award for Outstanding Original Main Title Theme Music
1995–96	Deadly Games	7 episodes
1995–2001	Star Trek: Voyager	65 episodes Nominated–Primetime Emmy Award for Outstanding Music Composition for a Series (2)
1997–98	Stargate SG-1	4 episodes
1998	Players	Episode: "Mint Condition"
1999	Dawson's Creek	9 episodes
1999-2000	Get Real	22 episodes
2001–02	Project Greenlight	12 episodes
2001–05	Star Trek: Enterprise	30 episodes Nominated–Primetime Emmy Award for Outstanding Music Composition for a Series

=== Other media ===
Year	Title	Notes
1996	The Utilizer	Short film
1996	Star Trek: Borg	Video game
1997	Still Kicking	Short film
2001	Hal Buckley	Short film
2004	Star Trek: The Experience	Theme attraction
2007	Bench	Short film
2009	Boba and Melon Gum	Short film
2010	Stew	Short film
2010	Walking with the Devil Inside	Short film
2010	Infernum	Short film
2010–17	Star Trek: The Romulan Wars	Web series
2011	A Better Place	Short film
2012	The Fisherman	Short film
2014–15	Starship Antyllus	Web series
2017	The Derelict: A Star Trek Fan Production	Short film
2017	Star Trek: Renegades	Web series
