= Canad =

Canad may refer to:

- Sanjak of Çanad, an Ottoman-era district
- Magyarcsanád, known in Serbian as Čanad, a village in Hungary
- Cenad, known in Serbian as Čanad, a commune in Romania

== See also ==
- Canad Inns, a chain of hotels
- Canard (disambiguation)
- Csanád (disambiguation)
- Kanad, a town in India
- Canada
