= Rent control (disambiguation) =

Rent control is part of a system of rent regulation that limits the changes that can be made in the price of renting a house or other real property.

It may also refer to:

- Rent Control (1984 film)
- Rent Control (2005 film)
- "Rent Control", an episode of TV series Big City Greens
