= Sherry Hursey =

American actress

- Born: Rutherfordton, North Carolina, U.S.
- Occupation: Actress
- Years active: 1975–present

Sherry Hursey is an American actress. She is best known for her recurring role as Ilene Markham on the sitcom Home Improvement and her 1988–1989 stint as Paula Carson on the soap opera Days of Our Lives.

Her other television credits include The Rookies, Happy Days, The Six Million Dollar Man, The Mary Tyler Moore Show, Rhoda, Simon & Simon, Matlock, Step by Step, Major Dad, Dr. Quinn, Medicine Woman, NYPD Blue and CSI: Crime Scene Investigation. She also appeared in a number of television films and the theatrical films Tom and Huck (1995) and Bring It On (2000), playing the mother of Kirsten Dunst's character. In 1996, she appeared in the television film Lying Eyes.

In 2010, Hursey starred and produced the television pilot Lilly's Light, starring in the title role. The series was about Lilly (Hursey), a foster mother living in an enchanted lighthouse while raising three foster children. Actors Mindy Sterling and Fred Willard also co-starred.

== Filmography ==
=== Film ===
Year	Title	Role	Notes
1978	Almost Summer	Lori Ottinger	
1982	The Avenging	Cynthia Justin	
1991	By the Sword	Tanos	
1996	Dead of Night	Hillary	
1999	California Myth	Jill Klein	
2000	Bring It On	Christine Shipman	
????	For the Actor	Casting Director	Short film, completed

=== Television ===
Year	Title	Role	Notes
1975	The Rookies	Shirley	"Reading, Writing and Angel Dust"
1975	Happy Days	Winnie McKinnie	"The Other Richie Cunningham"
1975	Rhoda	Patty Pappas	"If You Don't Tell Her, I Will"
1976	The Waltons	Felicia	"The House"
1976	The Mary Tyler Moore Show	Bonnie Slaughter	"Mary's Insomnia"
1977	Best Friends	Kathy	TV film
1977	The Six Million Dollar Man	Melissa McGrath	"Deadly Countdown: Parts 1 & 2"
1978	Family	Sherry Wilson	"Fear of Shadows"
1978	The Paper Chase	Jennie Todd	"Bell's in Love"
1979	Friendly Fire	Patricia Mullen	TV film
1980	Number 96	Jill Keaton	TV series
1980	Knots Landing	Trish	"Hitchhike: Part 2"
1981	Insight	Felicita	"God's Guerillas"
1982	Victims	Susan Arthur	TV film
1982	Tucker's Witch	Dawn	"Big Mouth"
1982	The Member of the Wedding	Janice	TV film
1982	High Powder	Cathy Brock	TV film
1983	Uncommon Valor	Nurse Keifer	TV film
1984	Emerald Point N.A.S.	Cindi Baines	"The Assignment", "Secrets"
1984	Riptide	Cheryl Watson	"Father's Day"
1984	Simon & Simon	Marie Blandings	"Corpus Delecti"
1985	Simon & Simon	Julie Bronson	"Have You Hugged Your Private Detective Today?"
1986	Prince of Bel-Air	Sandi	TV film
1986	Morningstar/Eveningstar	Debbie Flynn	Regular role
1986	You Are the Jury	Jane	"The State of Arizona vs. Dr. Evan Blake"
1987	Matlock	Diane Benson	"The Husband"
1988	She's the Sheriff	Lucy	"All Alone"
1988	Paradise	Jane Parker	"Stray Bullet"
1988-1989	Days of Our Lives	Paula Carson	TV series
1989	Freddy's Nightmares	Sheila Rake	"Silence Is Golden"
1989	Tour of Duty	Kitty Ashton	"Green Christmas"
1990	Doctor Doctor	Marilyn Challenger	"Fetal Attraction"
1990	Going Places	Michelle	"Married to the Mob"
1991	Mrs. Lambert Remembers Love	Etta Crue	TV film
1991	Dark Justice	Estelle Roberts	"The Neutralizing Factor"
1992	Step by Step	Luanne Dexter	"Daddy's Girl"
1992	Tequila and Bonetti	Janice Curtis	"A Perfect Match"
1992	Major Dad	Liz Harrington	"Here's Looking at You, Pol"
1993-1997	Home Improvement	Ilene Markham	Recurring role
1994	Dr. Quinn, Medicine Woman	Louise Chambers	"Just One Lullaby"
1994	The Rockford Files: I Still Love L.A.	Mattie	TV film
1994	The Last Chance Detectives: Mystery Lights of Navajo Mesa	Gail Fowler	TV film
1995	Bless This House	Mrs. Lessner	"The Postman Always Moves Twice"
1995	The Last Chance Detectives: Legend of the Desert Bigfoot	Gail Fowler	TV film
1996	Lying Eyes	Ruth Miller	TV film
1996	The Last Chance Detectives: Escape from Fire Lake	Gail Fowler	TV film
1999	Hit and Run	Nancy Grayson	TV film
2000	NYPD Blue	Sara Lorenz	"Little Abner"
2001	Any Day Now	Ms. Hubbard	"Don't Give Up"
2001	CSI: Crime Scene Investigation	Mrs. Rycoff	"Chaos Theory"
2002	Touched by an Angel	Debbi	"Secrets and Lies"
2003	Judging Amy	Joanne Padgett	"Sixteen Going on Seventeen"
2003	JAG	Mrs. Lindsey	"Second Acts"
2005	Nip/Tuck	Lynn James	"Rhea Reynolds"
2010	Lilly's Light	Lilly	TV film
