= Crystle Lightning =

Canadian actor and model

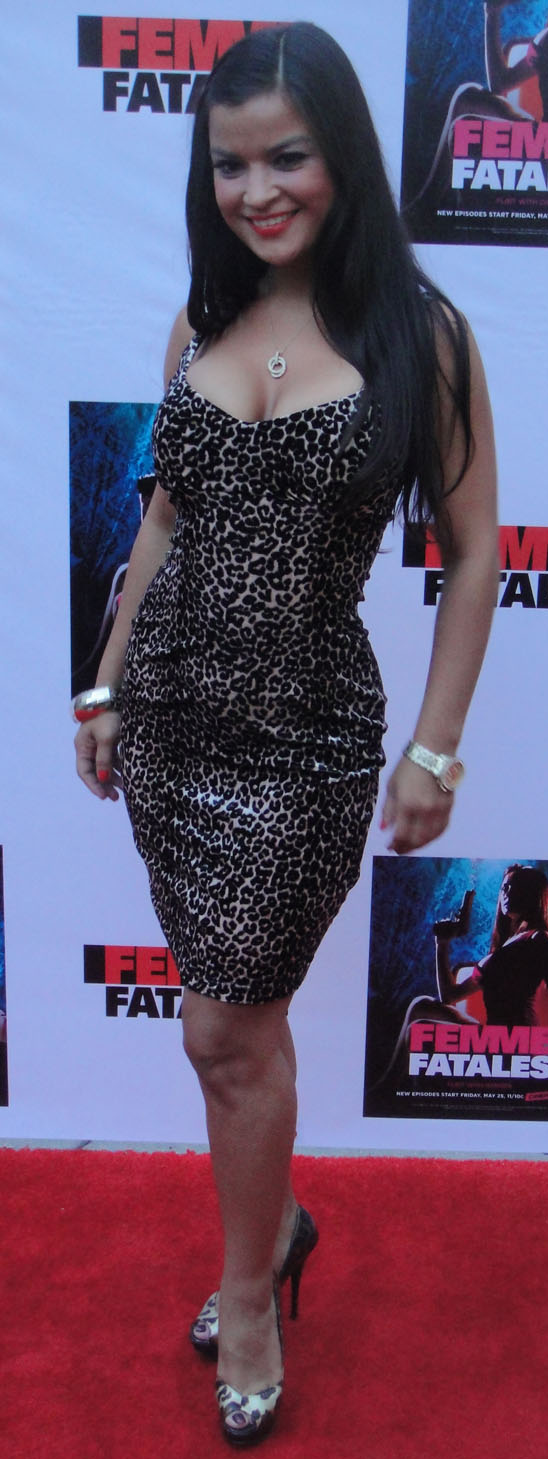
- Lightning on the Femme Fatales red carpet
- Occupations: Recording artist, actress, DJ, Indigenous rights activist
- Years active: 1994–present
- Label: 1491 Nation
- Parent: Georgina Lightning
- Relatives: Cody Lightning (brother)

Crystle Lightning is a Canadian actress and musician of First Nations descent.

== Early life ==
Lightning is an Enoch Cree artist.

== Film career ==
Lightning started acting in 1994 and has been in several films, with her most notable role portraying Lori Piestewa in Saving Jessica Lynch. She played the lead role of Jo in 3 Ninjas Knuckle Up (1995). Since then, she has been cast in a recurring role on the daytime NBC soap Days of Our Lives, played Chloe in 2005's American Pie Presents: Band Camp, The CW/BET/Paramount+'s The Game (2006), the spinoff of Girlfriends; and in Older Than America (2008) alongside Bradley Cooper. She also voiced Jen, the girlfriend of the game's protagonist, Tommy, in the 2006 video game Prey.

At the 9th Canadian Screen Awards in 2021, she won the award for Best Actress in a Drama Series for Trickster.

== Music career ==
Lightning is also an electro house DJ. Inspired by a mix performed by DJ Lady Tribe at a local Los Angeles nightspot, Lightning sought a musical apprenticeship with Christi Mills, later partnering with her mentor to form a performance crew called Ladies of the House. They perform regularly at Los Angeles venues, as well as throughout the United States.

=== LightningCloud ===
Moving from the DJ booth to the center-stage mic, Lightning paired up with MC RedCloud to form the hip-hop group LightningCloud. The pair released their self-titled debut, LightningCloud, in 2012 with RedCloud's long-term musical collaborator, DJ Hydroe. Sam Slovik of L.A. Weekly called the group, "a near-earth object inventing new realms of the Electro-House-Hip-Hop revolution on the planet. Urban futurist[s], MC RedCloud and Crystle Lightning are L.A.'s subterranean Bonnie and Clyde." The Aboriginal Peoples Choice Music Awards (APCMA) honored the group with recognition for Best Hip Hop Album in November 2012. In 2013, LightningCloud won the "Who's Next: Battle for the Best" contest on Power 106. As winners, LightningCloud received a cash prize, a performance with Kendrick Lamar, and the honor of representing west coast hip hop against Hot 97's Brooklyn-based east coast representative, Radamiz, in a freestyle battle in Austin, Texas, on March 15, 2013. After winning that MC battle, LightningCloud received the opportunity to work with Timbaland in the recording studio.

== Filmography ==
=== Film ===
Year	Title	Role	Notes
1994	The Last Chance Detectives: Mystery Lights of Navajo Mesa	Winnie	
1995	3 Ninjas Knuckle Up	Jo	
1995	Tecumseh: The Last Warrior	Star Watcher	
1995	The Last Chance Detectives: Legend of the Desert Bigfoot	Winnie	
1996	The Last Chance Detectives: Escape from Fire Lake	Winnie	
2003	Saving Jessica Lynch	Pfc Lori Piestewa	
2005	American Pie Presents: Band Camp	Chloe	
2008	Older than America	Diane	
2014	Death Factory	Girl in Trunk	Uncredited
2015	Tamales and Gumbo	Gloria's Cousin	
2023	Fancy Dance	Sapphire	
2025	Buffalo Daze	Mary Pablo	

=== Short film ===
Year	Title	Role	Notes
1998	Yellow Wooden Ring	Velma Blea	
1998	6/29	Paula Cooper	
2010	Sardines	Tiffany	
2010	The Ricochet	Misty	
2010	Search for the World's Best Indian Taco	Rose	
2014	Unmatched	Candi	
2022	Stripper	Ashley	
2024	Mary Margaret Road Grader		

=== Television ===
Year	Title	Role	Notes
1995	ABC Weekend Special	Keah Nez	Episode: "The Secret of Lizard Woman"
2001	Touched by an Angel	Anna Hernandez	Episode: "Mi Familia"
2006	The Game	Scantily Clad Girl #2	Episode: "Mi Casa Es Su Casa"
2006	Live! From the Future	Herself	
2008	Days of Our Lives	Sasha	Episode: #1.10981
2009	Tease	Tina	3 episodes
2012	Femme Fatales	Candela	Episode: "Hell Hath No Furies"
2013	Southland	Tia	Episode: "The Felix Paradox"
2018	Yellowstone	Verda Stands Alone	Episode: "Daybreak" as Crystle Lea Lightning
2018	Outlander	Giduhwa	Episode: "Common Ground"
2020	Trickster	Maggie	6 episodes
2021	Hudson & Rex	Kiera Laford	Episode: "Blood on the Tracks"
2021	The Good Doctor	Val	Episode: "One Heart"
2021–2022	Diggstown	Michelle Knockwood	8 episodes
2022	Rutherford Falls	Shauna	Episode: "Halloween"
2022	Three Pines	Missy Two-Rivers	5 episodes
2022	Ghosts	Shiki	Recurring role
2023	Lawmen: Bass Reeves	Nita	Episode: "Part II"
2024	Spirit Rangers	Twigs	Episode: "Summer's in Charge/Barracuda Brouhaha"
2026	Anna Pigeon	Frieda Dierkz	5 episodes

=== Video games ===
Year	Title	Role
2006	Prey	Jen/Radio Caller #2 (voice)
