= Canardo =

Canardo may refer to:

- Canardo (rapper), French rapper of Moroccan origin
- Mariano Cañardo (1906–1987), Spanish professional road racing cyclist
- Inspector Canardo, comic book series created by the Belgian artist Benoît Sokal

== See also ==
- Canard (disambiguation)
