= Buddy Faro =

- Genre: Crime drama
- Created by: Mark Frost
- Starring: Dennis Farina; Frank Whaley; Allison Smith; Charlie Robinson
- Composer: Joel McNeely
- Country of origin: United States
- Original language: English
- No. of seasons: 1
- No. of episodes: 13 (5 unaired)

Production
- Executive producers: Mark Frost; Aaron Spelling; E. Duke Vincent
- Producer: Dennis Farina
- Running time: 60 minutes
- Production companies: Uncle Monkey Productions; Industry Entertainment; Spelling Television

Original release
- Network: CBS
- Release: September 25 – December 4, 1998

Buddy Faro is an American crime drama television series created by Mark Frost, starring Dennis Farina that aired on CBS from September 25 to December 4, 1998. The series was cancelled after eight episodes due to low ratings.

Frost said the show was "born out of [his] desire to bring a sense of fun and high style back to hour drama".

== Premise ==
A legendary private investigator disappeared in 1978 when he was trying to solve the murder of the woman he fell in love with. Twenty years later he is tracked down by PI Bob Jones and together they reopen Buddy's agency, with help from actress Julie Barber and Buddy's old partner El Jefe.

== Cast ==
- Dennis Farina as Buddy Faro
- Frank Whaley as Bob Jones
- Allison Smith as Julie Barber
- Charlie Robinson as El Jefe

== Episodes ==
No.	Title	Directed by	Written by	Original release date	Prod. code
1	"Pilot"	Charles Haid	Mark Frost	September 25, 1998	1498002
Buddy Faro returns to Los Angeles and partners with an amateur investigator.
2	"The Curse of the Faro"	Charles Haid	Mark Frost	October 2, 1998	3198001
George Hamilton, who played Buddy Faro in 1970s TV series based on him, hires Buddy and Bob to protect him from a killer.
3	"Touched by an Amnesiac"	Lesli Linka Glatter	Kimberly Costello	October 9, 1998	3198002
A woman has no memory of who she is or why her 10 000 dollars are covered in a white substance.
4	"Ain't That a Kick in the Head"	Marc Buckland	Elizabeth M. Cosin	October 16, 1998	3198004
A professional basketball player has been discovered in bed with a minor.
5	"Now You See Him, Now He's Dead"	John Patterson	Jon Hotchkiss	October 23, 1998	3198005
Buddy and Bob tries to track down the twin of a magician.
6	"Death by Airbrush"	Charles Haid	Barry Pullman	November 6, 1998	3198003
The team goes looking into the background of a woman about to marry into a wealthy family.
7	"Talk Show Heller"	Charles Haid	Mark Frost	November 13, 1998	3198007
A woman is murdered after she is embarrassed on a sleazy talk show.
8	"Get Me Cody Swift"	D. J. Caruso	Barry Pullman	December 4, 1998	3198008
A teenage movie star seeks help from Buddy Faro when he thinks he's in danger.
9	"The Match Game"	TBD	TBD	Unaired	3198006
Buddy and Bob investigate a high-profile matchmaker.
10	"The Truth is in the Trash"	Ted Kotcheff	Scott Frost	Unaired	3198009
Buddy reunites with an old partner when he looks into the 20-year-old case of a missing showgirl.
11	"Done Away in a Manger"	TBD	TBD	Unaired	3198010
The wife of a movie star finds a snake in her Christmas stocking.
12	"Charlotte's Tangled Web"	TBD	TBD	Unaired	3198011
A friend of Julie captures a murder on video.
13	"Who's the Muse?"	Ted Kotcheff	Kimberly Costello	Unaired	3198012
The books of an author turns into real-life crimes.
