= Older than America =

- Film poster
- Directed by: Georgina Lightning
- Written by: Georgina Lightning; Christine K. Walker
- Produced by: Christine K. Walker
- Starring: Adam Beach; Bradley Cooper; Tantoo Cardinal; Georgina Lightning; Wes Studi
- Cinematography: Shane Kelly
- Edited by: Michael Miller; Clayton Condit
- Music by: George S. Clinton
- Production company: Tribal Alliance Productions
- Release date: March 8, 2008 (South by Southwest Film Festival)
- Running time: 101 minutes
- Country: United States
- Languages: English; Anishinaabemowin

Older than America (alternatively titled American Evil) is 2008 American suspense drama film directed by Georgina Lightning and starring Adam Beach, Wes Studi, Tantoo Cardinal, Georgina Lightning and Bradley Cooper. The film explores the devastating personal and cultural effects of the American Indian boarding schools on the members of a Native American family in Minnesota.

== Plot ==
Three intersecting stories are told centered on the Fond du Lac Indian Reservation and the adjacent town of Cloquet in the Arrowhead Region of northeastern Minnesota. The answers to the outstanding questions in these stories are all hidden in the secrets from a generation ago at the now abandoned Catholic boarding school on the reservation.

In Story One, Ojibwe Native Americans Rain Many Lightnings O'Rourke (Georgina Lightning) and Johnny Goodfeather (Adam Beach), a teacher and a police officer have been living together for ten years, off the reservation despite Johnny's job solely out of circumstance. They have not felt ready to get married until now, Johnny asking her which coincides with his announcement that he has been accepted into the FBI training program in Washington, DC. Rain isn't sure if she is prepared to move, since her mother, Irene, has long been institutionalized in a local psychiatric institution diagnosed as schizophrenic, she inching closer to being in a vegetative state. Under this circumstance, Rain was raised by her Aunt Barbara ("Auntie Apple"), a devout Catholic who has long assimilated into western society and who turns to local priest Father Bartoli for any guidance. One day, after Rain swerves to avoid some children in the road and winds up in a car accident, Johnny swears there were none. What Rain eventually confides to Johnny is that she of late has been seeing visions of things she doesn't understand, she fearing that she may be going the way of her mother. She is later transferred to a psychiatric institution; when Johnny challenges Auntie Apple and tries to force his way to her, his hotheadedness gets him arrested. Rain eventually finds out the children she's been seeing running around the community are not living children, but the spirits of dead children. Through visions and investigations she discovers these unquiet dead are the little girls and boys who were murdered at the Indian boarding school that used to kidnap, institutionalize, and abuse children in the community. She realizes that the spirits of the children are speaking to her so the truth can come to light and that, maybe, the community can finally find healing.

In Story Two, Luke Patterson (Bradley Cooper), a government geologist, has come to the area to investigate a reported earthquake - if it be the case, a rare earthquake - on the reservation. Beyond Johnny helping him get a city hall permit to investigate on the reservation, Luke befriends Johnny and his family during his extended stay in the area and begins to learn more about the history behind the reservation and the local boarding school from Johnny's father Pete.

In Story Three, Steve Klamath is running for mayor against the long time incumbent, Paul Gunderson, who has always been pro-development on the reservation. As the campaign progresses, Steve, who wants to fight for indigenous rights from the inside of the establishment, seems to be waging a losing battle both within the Native population as they historically stay home on voting day, and with the non-Native population who largely viewing him with contempt for his policies. Local radio talk show host Richard Two Rivers (Wes Studi), who is seen as the voice of the reservation, outwardly gives Steve's campaign airtime if only because it is Steve's side who contacts the radio station about the campaign, although his background shows Richard may not be who he is as perceived by the public.

== Cast ==
- Adam Beach as John Goodfeather, Fond du Lac Reservation police officer and Rain's fiance
- Georgina Lightning as Rain Many Lightnings O'Rourke, an elementary school teacher and John's fiance
- Bradley Cooper as Luke Peterson, a U.S. government geologist investigating an earthquake that happened on Fond du Lac reservation
- Tantoo Cardinal as Barbara "Auntie Apple" O'Rourke, Rain's aunt and Irene's sister
- Stephen Yoakam as Father Dimitri Bartoli
- Dan Harrison as Walter Many Lightnings, Rain's uncle and brother of Irene and Barbara
- Wes Studi as Richard Two Rivers, a reservation radio DJ
- Glen Gould as Steve Klamath, a Native American mayoral candidate
- Dennis Banks as Pete Goodfeather, John's father and tribal medicine man
- Chris Mulkey as Paul Gunderson, the incumbent mayor running for re-election
- Rose Berens as Irene Many Lightnings O'Rourke, Rain's mother and Barbara's sister
- Crystle Lightning as Diane, Rain's friend
- Gloria Eshkibok as Mattie Moonshadow, a clerical worker at the local Indian Affairs office

== Production ==
The film was inspired by events from Lightning's life, and the lives of her family members and community. Her father, who occasionally had violent outbursts, had been silent about his childhood. When Lightning was 18, her father committed suicide. This shocking event launched her on a quest, as she attempted to find out about her father's mysterious childhood. In the course of her research, she found herself visiting the Indian boarding school where her father, along with many First Nations children, had been institutionalized as a boy. She saw the large cemetery behind the school, with the names of so many young students on the headstones. From this disturbing experience, the concept for the film emerged.

While the filmmaker is from Canada, the film is set in America, and was shot primarily at the Fond du Lac Indian Reservation in Minnesota. Filming took place in late 2006 on or around the Fond du Lac Reservation and Cloquet and Esko, Minnesota.

=== Music ===
The film's music was compiled and produced by George S. Clinton.

== Release ==
Older than America retitled as American Evil for UK DVD release

The official world premiere for Older than America took place at the 2008 SXSW Festival in the narrative feature competition. The film screened at other festivals including the Women with Vision Festival in March 2008, Talking Stick Film Festival in June 2008 and Lake Arrowhead Film Festival in April 2009.

The film had a VOD release through IFC Films on March 17, 2010. The film was released in DVD format on October 12, 2010. The film was released on DVD and Blu-ray Disc by Metrodome in the United Kingdom under the title American Evil on March 5, 2012, for which the cover art and starring credit highlights Bradley Cooper's role in the film. The film received mostly negative reviews in the UK after its DVD and Blu-ray Disc release, with most critics calling it cheaply made, and was only released in the UK due to the mass popularity of actor Bradley Cooper and his involvement in the film to boost sales.

== Accolades ==
The film won Best Director and Best Supporting Actor (for Wes Studi) awards at the American Indian Film Festival. It was named Best Dramatic Feature at the 2008 Flyway Film Festival. The film received the Aloha Accolade Award from the Honolulu International Film Festival on March 8, 2009.
