= Jamie Rose =

American actress and acting instructor (born 1959)

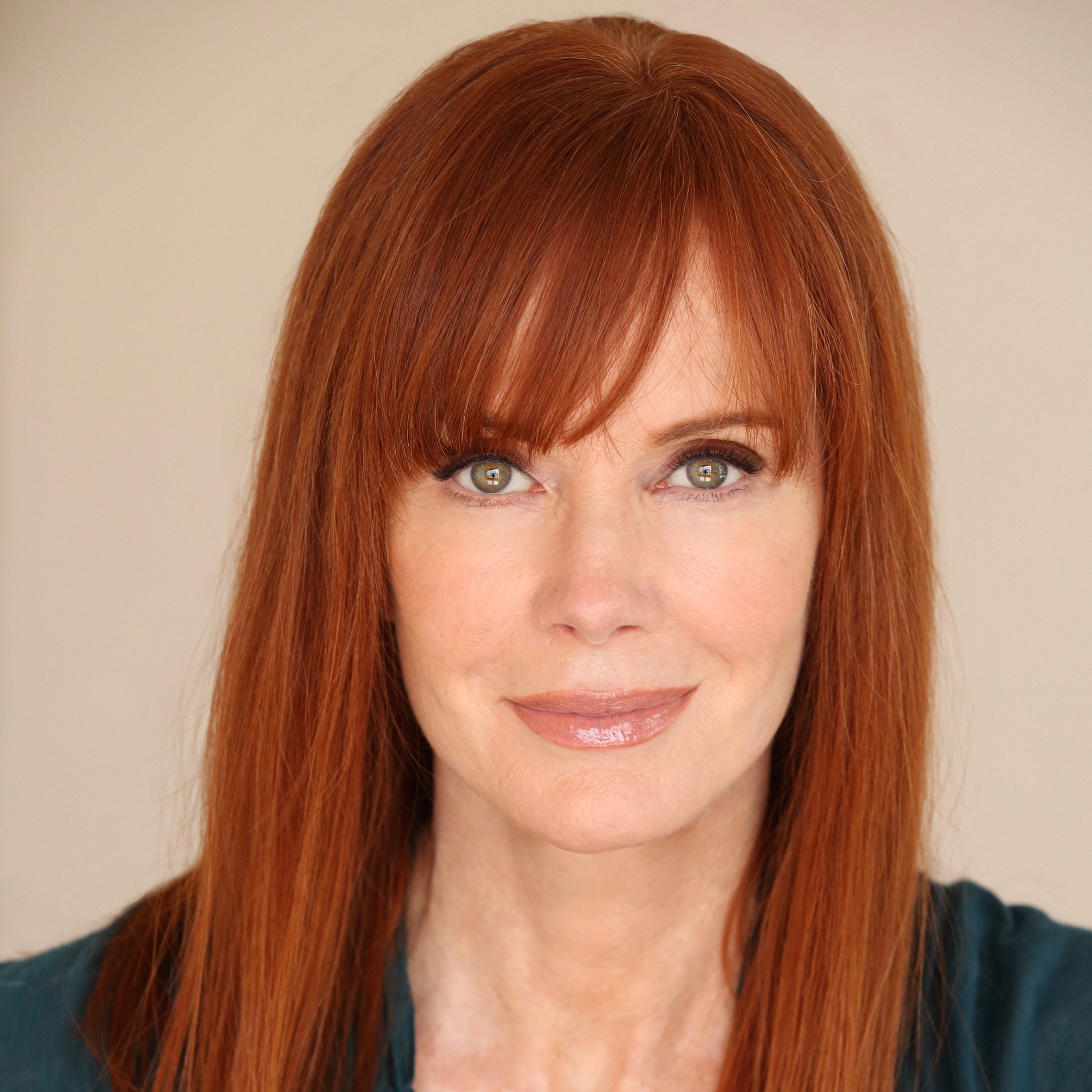
- Rose in 2015
- Born: November 26, 1959 (age 66); New York City, U.S.
- Education: California State University, Northridge
- Occupations: Actress; acting coach
- Years active: 1965–present
- Spouses: James Orr (m. 1986; div. 1988) Kip Gilman (m. 2006; div. 2017)
- Website: jamierosecoaching.com

Jamie Rose (born November 26, 1959) is an American actress and acting coach. Born in New York City, Rose was raised in Southern California, where she began her career as a child actor, first appearing in commercials. She made her feature film debut in the cult horror film Just Before Dawn (1981), and subsequently had supporting roles in Clint Eastwood's Tightrope and Heartbreakers (both 1984).

Rose has numerous television credits, including the role of Vickie Gioberti on the primetime soap opera Falcon Crest (1981–1983), as well as the lead on the crime series Lady Blue (1985–1986). Later film credits include Atlas Shrugged: Part II (2012), as well as guest-starring roles on the series Jane the Virgin (2015) and Grey's Anatomy (2016).

Since 2007, Rose has operated her own acting studio workshop, JRose Studio, in Los Angeles. She has also written a book, Shut Up and Dance! The Joy of Letting Go of the Lead--On the Dance Floor and Off, published in 2011.

== Early life ==
Jamie Rose was born November 26, 1959, in New York City to Stewart, a singer and dancer, and Reta Rose, a former Radio City Rockette. Shortly after her birth, Rose's family relocated from New York City to California, where she was raised in the Van Nuys section of Los Angeles. Her father was Jewish, and she was raised in this faith. Rose began acting at age six, first appearing in commercials for Kool-Aid, and later, Mountain Dew as an adolescent. When Rose was 14, the family relocated to Fresno, where her father accepted a job as a building contractor. Rose graduated from Bullard High School in 1977, and subsequently attended California State University, Fresno before transferring to the University of California, Santa Cruz. After a year, Rose decided to return to Los Angeles, and transferred to California State University, Northridge, where she majored in theater; she eventually dropped out, however, to begin acting professionally.

== Career ==
She made her feature film debut in Jeff Lieberman's slasher film Just Before Dawn (1981), and subsequently had supporting roles in Clint Eastwood's Tightrope and Heartbreakers (both 1984).

Rose portrayed Vickie Gioberti on the primetime soap opera Falcon Crest (1981–1983), as well as the lead on the crime series Lady Blue (1985–1986). She appeared in guest-starring roles on various series in the 1980s, including Hotel, Columbo, and Murder, She Wrote. She also had a supporting part in the 1996 television film Lying Eyes, as well as guest appearances on Chicago Hope (1994–1995), Renegade (1994–1996), Ally McBeal (1997), and Walker, Texas Ranger (also 1997).

In 2012, Rose guest-starred on the series Criminal Minds and had a supporting role in the film Atlas Shrugged: Part II. She subsequently had guest-starring roles on Jane the Virgin (2015) and Grey's Anatomy (2016).

== Book ==
Rose's memoir/self-help book about her experiences learning the tango and how it affected her relationship, Shut Up and Dance! The Joy of Letting Go of the Lead--On the Dance Floor and Off, was released September 15, 2011.

== Personal life ==
Rose married filmmaker James Orr in 1986, though they later divorced. In 2006, Rose married actor Kip Gilman, whom she met on a blind date in 1997. They divorced in 2017.

Since September 2007, she has been teaching acting through her JRose Studio in Los Angeles, California.

== Filmography ==
=== Film ===
Year	Title	Role	Notes	Ref.
1981	Just Before Dawn	Megan		
1984	Tightrope	Melanie Silber		
1984	Heartbreakers	Libby		
1985	Rebel Love	Columbine Cromwell		
1989	Chrome Hearts	Dede		
1989	Playroom	Marcy		
1991	Chopper Chicks in Zombietown	Dede		
1991	To Die Standing	Constance Bigelow	Alternate title: Crackdown	
1996	The Chain	Ellen Morrisey		
2001	Holiday in the Sun	Judy		
2012	Atlas Shrugged: Part II	Sara Connelly		
2012	Route 30, Too!	Dot		
2014	Route 30 Three!	G-Woman		
2016	The Father and the Bear	Joyce Redman		

=== Television ===
Year	Title	Role	Notes	Ref.
1967	Family Affair	Girl	Episode: "Fat, Fat, the Water Rat"	
1968	Green Acres	Girl #4	Episode: "My Mother, the Countess"	
1983	Fantasy Island	Virginia Smith	Episode: "The Other Man – Mr. Roarke/Forbidden Love"	
1981–1983	Falcon Crest	Vickie Gioberti Hogan	Main role (seasons 1–2); recurring role (season 3)	
1981	Twirl	Lisa Hines	Television film	
1982	In Love with an Older Woman	Debbie	Television film	
1984	Jessie	Kit Parnell	Episode: "Flesh Wounds"	
1984	Matt Houston	Rhonda	Episode: "Caged"	
1984	Paper Dolls	Connor Crossland	Episode One	
1984	Flight 90: Disaster on the Potomac	Marilyn Nichols	Television film	
1984	Never Again	Abby Cartwright	Television film	
1985	Simon & Simon	Stephanie	2 episodes	
1985	Amazing Stories	Mrs. Northrup	Episode: "Vanessa in the Garden"	
1986	St. Elsewhere	Dr. Birch	4 episodes	
1985–1986	Lady Blue	Katy Mahoney	Lead role	
1987	Duet	Rachel	2 episodes	
1985–1988	Hotel	Kate Marris / Brooke Hastings	2 episodes	
1988	Valerie	Peggy Hayes	Episode: "Dad's First Date"	
1988–1993	Murder, She Wrote	Laura Martin / Lisa McCauley / Anne Lowery	3 episodes	
1989	Hard Time on Planet Earth	Laura Rowlands	Episode: "Something to Bank On"	
1990	Hardball		Episode: "The Angel of Death"	
1989–1990	My Two Dads	Sarah	4 episodes	
1990	Broken Badges	Sarah Bakum	Episode: "Strawberry"	
1990	Voices Within: The Lives of Truddi Chase	Truddi's mother	Television film	
1991	Columbo	Nancy Brower	Episode: "Death Hits the Jackpot"	
1991	Brotherhood of the Gun	Kate	Television film	
1992	Civil Wars	Adriana Chase	Episode: "Drone of Arc"	
1993	The Second Half	Toni	Episode: "Same Bet Next Year"	
1993–1998	Silk Stalkings	Jacqueline 'Jackie' Webster / Patricia Van Barrow / Jasmine / Catherine Hayworth	3 episodes	
1994–1995	Chicago Hope	Stacey Halmora	3 episodes	
1994–1996	Renegade	Jill Tanner / Jody Whitley / Tanya Mason	2 episodes	
1994–1997	Viper	Marian Franklin / Gloria	2 episodes	
1995	The Watcher	Lauren	Episode: "Heartburned"	
1995–1998	Weird Science	Agent Molly	2 episodes	
1996	Nowhereland	Claire Hilliard	Episode: "Doppelgänger"	
1996–1997	The Sentinel	Sheila Irwin	2 episodes	
1996	Terminal	Sheila Adamson	Television film	
1996	My Son Is Innocent	Joann Brodsky	Television film	
1996	Lying Eyes	Elizabeth Bradshaw	Television film	
1997	JAG	Liz Holst	Episode: "Rendezvous"	
1997	Ally McBeal	Sandra Winchell	Episode: "The Promise"	
1997	Walker, Texas Ranger	Sarah Rose	2 episodes	
1999	Crusade	Cynthia Allen	Episode: "The Rules of the Game"	
1999	The Test of Love	Judith Evans	Television film	
2000	NYPD Blue	Nicki Cameron	Episode: "The Irvin Files"	
2002	The Court	Mrs. Rockland	Episode: "A Wing and a Prayer"	
2003	Dragnet	Andrea Furnell	Episode: "Redemption"	
2005	ER	Marilyn Bracken	Episode: "You Are Here"	
2007	Murder 101: College Can Be Murder	Muriel Coe	Television film	
2007	Primal Doubt	Dr. Marianne Thorne	Television film	
2007	Cold Case	Melissa Canter '07	Episode: "Thick as Thieves"	
2008	Two and a Half Men	Sloane Jagov	Episode: "Fish in a Drawer"	
2008	House	Patty Michener	Episode: "Dying Changes Everything"	
2008–2009	In2ition	Mrs. Fox	Web series; recurring role	
2012	Criminal Minds	Linda Nelson	Episode: "God Complex"	
2013	Franklin & Bash	Judge Helen Daniels	Episode: "Good Lovin'"	
2015	Jane the Virgin	Therapist	Episode: "Chapter Twelve"	
2016	Grey's Anatomy	Lena	Episode: "Odd Man Out"	

== Sources ==
- Berard, Jeanette M.; Englund, Klaudia, eds. (2009). Television Series and Specials Scripts, 1946-1992: A Catalog of the American Radio Archives Collection. Jefferson, North Carolina: McFarland. ISBN 978-0-786-45437-2.
- Terrace, Vincent (2020). Encyclopedia of Television Pilots: 2,470 Films Broadcast 1937-2019 (2nd ed.). Jefferson, North Carolina: McFarland. ISBN 978-1-476-63810-2.
- Weldon, Michael (1996). The Psychotronic Video Guide to Film. New York City, New York: Macmillan. ISBN 978-0-312-13149-4.
