= Ol' Yellow Eyes Is Back =

1991 studio album by Brent Spiner

Studio album by Brent Spiner
- Released: June 11, 1991
- Genre: Traditional pop
- Length: 34:11
- Labels: Bay Cities, Inc.
- Producers: Wendy Neuss, Dennis McCarthy, Brent Spiner

Ol' Yellow Eyes Is Back is a 1991 album by American performer Brent Spiner. On the album, Spiner is backed by a big band and sings a number of old pop standards, mostly from the 1930s and 1940s.

The title has a dual meaning, referring to the yellow contact lenses Spiner wore for his role as Data in the TV series Star Trek: The Next Generation, and also to singer Frank Sinatra's album Ol' Blue Eyes Is Back which was performed in a similar pop style.

== Background ==
In the liner notes, Spiner wrote of Sinatra's "You Make Me Feel So Young":

Sinatra at his awesome best. This song and dozens of others accompanied every dinner I ate between the ages of five and thirteen. My stepfather, an amateur saxophone player and a hell of a mambo dancer, had put together one of the all time great collections of popular music recordings anywhere. So, to my good fortune, we dined each night with the likes of Ol' Blue Eyes, Judy Garland, Nat "King" Cole, Rosemary Clooney, Louis Prima and Keely Smith and every other singer that ever performed on Capitol, Decca or R.C.A. records.

== Production ==
Spiner had help from a number of his colleagues from Star Trek: TNG. Wendy Neuss, associate producer for the series, and Dennis McCarthy, who scored the music for many of the episodes, co-produced the album with Spiner. Several fellow cast members (LeVar Burton, Michael Dorn, Jonathan Frakes, and Patrick Stewart) joined him to sing "It's a Sin (To Tell a Lie)," appearing under the group name of "The Sunspots", a word play on The Ink Spots, the first group to perform this song. McCarthy praised the recording experience, and compared it to the time he spent earlier in his career on tour with Glen Campbell.

== Release ==
According to Spiner, the album was released in Europe against his wishes after he had rejected attempts by the record company to renegotiate his contract.

== Track listing ==
1. "Time After Time" (w. Sammy Cahn m. Jule Styne)
2. "The Very Thought of You" (w.m. Ray Noble)
3. "More Than You Know" (w. Edward Eliscu & Billy Rose m. Vincent Youmans)
4. "Toot Toot Tootsie" (w.m. Ted Fio Rito, Robert A. King, Gus Kahn & Ernie Erdman)
5. "Embraceable You" (w. Ira Gershwin m. George Gershwin)
6. "It's a Sin (To Tell a Lie)" (w.m. Billy Mayhew)
7. "Long, Long Time" (w. Sammy Cahn m. Jule Styne)
8. "Carolina in the Morning" (w. Gus Kahn m. Walter Donaldson)
9. "Marie" (Randy Newman)
10. "Zing! Went the Strings of My Heart" (w.m. James F. Hanley)
11. "When I Fall in Love" (w. Edward Heyman m. Victor Young)
12. "Goodnight, Sweetheart" (w.m. Ray Noble, Jimmy Campbell, Reg Connelly, adapted by Rudy Vallee)

== Personnel ==
- Brent Spiner: Lead vocals
- The Sunspots: Back-up vocals for "It's a Sin (To Tell a Lie)"
  - LeVar Burton
  - Michael Dorn
  - Jonathan Frakes
  - Patrick Stewart
- Ralph Humphrey: drums
- Ken Wild: Bass
- George Doering: Guitar
- Jim Cox: Piano
- John Kavanaugh: Piano
- Bob O'Donnell: Trumpet
- Bob Findley: Trumpet
- John Rosenberg: Trumpet
- Dick Hyde: Trombone
- Lew McCreary: Trombone
- Ernie Carlson: Trombone
- Pete Christlieb: Woodwinds
- Gene Cipriano: Woodwinds
- Brian O'Connor: French horn
- Joe Meyer: French horn
- Asa Drori: String concertmaster
- Bob Joyce: Additional back-up vocals on "It's A Sin"
- David Joyce: Additional back-up vocals on "It's A Sin"
- Randy Crenshaw: Additional back-up vocals on "It's A Sin"
