= Vincent Irizarry =

American actor

- Born: Vincent Michael Irizarry; November 12, 1959 (age 67); New York City, U.S.
- Education: Berklee College of Music
- Occupation: Actor
- Years active: 1983–present
- Spouse: Signy Coleman (m. 1989; div. 1992) Avalon House (m. 1997; sep. 2010)
- Children: 4, including Elias

Vincent Irizarry (born November 12, 1959) is an American actor. He was nominated for a Daytime Emmy Award in 1985 and 2002, and won in 2009.

== Early life and education ==
Irizarry was born in Queens and raised on Long Island, one of six children. His father Frank was originally from Puerto Rico while his mother Carmella "Millie" (née: Russo; died 2025) was the daughter of Italian immigrants from Sicily. After graduating from Sachem High School in 1977, he attended the Berklee College of Music, majoring in piano and composition, leaving before finishing his degree after becoming involved in acting and being awarded a full scholarship to the Lee Strasberg Theatre and Film Institute.

== Career ==
Irizarry got his start in daytime television in 1983 as Brandon/Lujack Luvonaczek Spaulding on Guiding Light. His character was paired up with Beth Raines (then Judi Evans Luciano) and they were considered a "supercouple." He was nominated for a Daytime Emmy Award in 1985. He then played Dr. Scott Clark from 1987 to 1989 on Santa Barbara. He also portrayed the role of Lujack Spaulding's twin brother Nick McHenry Spaulding on Guiding Light from July 1991 to February 26, 1996. Irizarry returned for a cameo in late-December 1996.

Irizarry was cast in the role of Dr. David Hayward on All My Children, a role he originated in 1997. Irizarry also went to One Life to Live, during the infamous baby-swap storyline in 2005. He portrayed David until November 28, 2006.

However, in November 2006, Irizarry joined the cast of The Young and the Restless as the character David Chow, first appearing on January 9, 2007. David Chow was romantically involved with Carmen Mesta, played by Marisa Ramirez. Originally contracted for 13 weeks, Irizarry's character proved popular, and his stay on the soap was extended.

On August 17, 2008, a spokesperson for All My Children confirmed that Irizarry would reprise the role of David Hayward. Irizarry returned to the studio in September and began making regular appearances in October until it aired its final episode on September 23, 2011.

In December 2012, Irizarry announced on his Facebook page that he would be joining Prospect Park's online reboot of All My Children, scheduled for Spring 2013. He reprised his Emmy award-winning role of Dr. David Hayward that he originated in 1997. It ran from April to September 2013.

In 2013, Irizarry appeared in an episode of Homeland.

In August 2015, news broke that Irizarry joined the cast of Days of Our Lives, portraying the role of Deimos Kiriakis, the bitter and vindictive younger half-brother of Victor Kiriakis. Irizarry made his first appearance in early January 2016. He was let go from the serial in February 2017, and then received a Daytime Emmy nomination. He will appear as Bradley Belasco in the audio drama Montecito, beginning April 22, 2025.

== Personal life ==
Irizarry's first child was born in May 1989.

He married actress Signy Coleman in July 1989 but they would divorce in 1992. Their daughter was born in 1990. He married Avalon House in 1997, and they have two children. Irizarry confirmed that he and House were in the process of getting a divorce in 2010.

== Filmography ==
Film
Year	Title	Role	Notes
1986	Heartbreak Ridge	Fragetti	film
1988	Circus	Sean	television film
1990	Lucky/Chances	Gino Santangelo	television miniseries
1996	Lying Eyes	Derek Bradshaw	television film

Television
Year	Title	Role	Notes
1983–1985, 1989, 1991–1996	Guiding Light	Brandon "Lujack" Luvonaczek; Nick McHenry Spaulding	role held (Lujack): November 28, 1983 – December 6, 1985; 1989, July 16, 1991, August 9, 1991, October 21, 1991; November 19, 1991, 1993 role held (Nick): July 16, 1991 – February 26, 1996; December 27 – 30, 1996 nominated — Daytime Emmy Award for Outstanding Younger Actor in a Drama Series (1986)
1987–1989	Santa Barbara	Scott Clark	role held: November 9, 1987 – October 18, 1989
1991	Murder, She Wrote	Michael Abruzzi	episode: "Family Doctor"
1997	Beverly Hills, 90210	Riggs	3 episodes
1997–2006, 2008–2011, 2013	All My Children	David Hayward	role held: November 27, 1997 – March 2, 1998; July 8, 1998 – November 28, 2006; October 23, 2008 – September 23, 2011; April 29, 2013 – September 2, 2013; Soap Opera Digest Award for Outstanding Villain; Daytime Emmy Award for Outstanding Supporting Actor in a Drama Series (2009) (tied with Jeff Branson); Nominated — Daytime Emmy Award for Outstanding Lead Actor in a Drama Series (2002)
2005	One Life to Live	David Hayward	3 episodes
2007–2008	The Young and the Restless	David Chow	role held: January 9, 2007 – August 1, 2008
2016–2017, 2021	Days of Our Lives	Deimos Kiriakis	role held: January 18, 2016 – June 29, 2017; November 1–2, 2021 nominated — Daytime Emmy Award for Outstanding Lead Actor in a Drama Series (2017)
2019–Present	The Bold and the Beautiful	Jordan Armstrong	10 episodes

== Awards ==
- Daytime Emmy Nomination, Outstanding Younger Man- GL (1986)
- Daytime Emmy Nomination, Outstanding Lead Actor- AMC (2002)
- Daytime Emmy Pre-Nomination, Outstanding Lead Actor- AMC (2003, 2004)
- Soap Opera Digest Outstanding Villain- AMC (1999)
- Winner, Best Supporting Actor (tied with Jeff Branson)-AMC (2009)
- Daytime Emmy Nomination, Outstanding Lead Actor- DOOL (2017)
