= Ol' Blue Eyes Is Back =

1973 studio album by Frank Sinatra

Studio album by Frank Sinatra
- Released: October 1973
- Recorded: June 4 – August 20, 1973
- Studios: Samuel Goldwyn, West Hollywood, California
- Genre: Traditional pop
- Length: 35:54
- Labels: Reprise; FS 2155
- Producer: Don Costa

Frank Sinatra chronology
Frank Sinatra's Greatest Hits, Vol. 2 (1972)	Ol' Blue Eyes Is Back (1973)	Some Nice Things I've Missed (1974)

Professional ratings
Review scores
Source	Rating
AllMusic	2/5 stars

Ol' Blue Eyes Is Back is a 1973 studio album by American singer Frank Sinatra.

Sinatra returned from his brief retirement with Ol' Blue Eyes Is Back. Released amidst a whirlwind of publicity, the album was a commercial success, earning gold status and peaking just outside the top-ten on the UK and Billboard album charts.

The album was accompanied by a television special, Magnavox Presents Frank Sinatra, which reunited Sinatra with Gene Kelly.

Genuine first pressings of the LP came with a bonus photo of Sinatra inside the cover.

== Track listing ==
1. "You Will Be My Music" (Joe Raposo) – 3:52
2. "You're So Right (For What's Wrong in My Life)" (Victoria Pike, Teddy Randazzo, Roger Joyce) – 4:03
3. "Winners" (Theme from Maurie) (Raposo) – 2:50
4. "Nobody Wins" (Kris Kristofferson) – 5:10
5. "Send In the Clowns" (From A Little Night Music) (Stephen Sondheim) – 4:10
6. "Dream Away" (From the MGM film The Man Who Loved Cat Dancing) (John Williams, Paul Williams) – 4:22
7. "Let Me Try Again" ("Laisse-moi le temps") (Paul Anka, Sammy Cahn, Michel Jourdan) – 3:31
8. "There Used to Be a Ballpark" (Raposo) – 3:34
9. "Noah" (Raposo) – 4:22

== Charts ==
Chart (1974)	Peak position
Australia (Kent Music Report)	19

== Certifications ==
Region	Certification	Certified units/sales
Australia (ARIA)	Gold	20,000^{^}
United Kingdom (BPI)	Gold	100,000^{^}
United States (RIAA)	Gold	500,000^{^}
^{^} Shipments figures based on certification alone.

== Personnel ==
- Frank Sinatra – vocals
- Gordon Jenkins – arranger, conductor
- Don Costa – arranger, conductor

== See also ==
- Ol' Yellow Eyes Is Back – a 1991 album by actor Brent Spiner
- Old Red Eyes Is Back – a 1991 song by band the Beautiful South
- Ol' Brown Ears Is Back – a 1993 album by puppeteer Jim Henson as the Muppet character Rowlf the Dog
- Ol' Blue Balls Is Back! – a 1999 album by novelty music act Red Peters
