= Allison Smith (actress) =

American actress (born 1969)

- Born: December 9, 1969 (age 56); Manhattan, New York, U.S.
- Occupations: Actress; singer; writer; director
- Years active: 1981–present
- Known for: Annie; Kate & Allie; The West Wing
- Spouse: Randy Grimmett (m. 2001)

Allison Smith (born December 9, 1969) is an American actress, singer, writer and director, best known for her work on television as Mallory O'Brien in Aaron Sorkin's Emmy Award-winning NBC drama The West Wing and for starring on Broadway in the title role Annie. She also played the role of Jennie Lowell on the 1980s Emmy Award-winning sitcom Kate & Allie. In addition to starring in Annie, Smith has also appeared on stage in a host of other roles, including a part in the original Broadway production of Evita (alongside Patti LuPone and Mandy Patinkin), a starring role in the Los Angeles premiere production of David Mamet's Oleanna, and supporting roles in Peter Parnell's QED (opposite Alan Alda), and the musical The Education Of Randy Newman, in which she played Randy Newman's first wife.

== Selected filmography ==
=== Selected television roles ===
Year	Title	Role	Notes
1981	CBS Library	Suzie	
1981	Evita Peron	Young Evita	TV movie
1982	Broadway Plays Washington on Kennedy Center Tonight	Herself	TV movie
1982	All by Myself: The Eartha Kitt Story	Herself	
1983	Silver Spoons	Barbra Webster	
1984	ABC Weekend Special	Christi Bay	
1984–89	Kate & Allie	Jennie Lowell	Main cast
1985	Young People's Specials	Marty	
1987	Who Am I Now?	Older Sarah	Educational video
1989	Hunter	Cheryl Donovan	
1990	Wolf	Cynthia Costanza	
1994	The Adventures of Young Indiana Jones: Hollywood Follies	Claire Lieberman	TV movie
1995	Sweet Justice	Sara Pratt	Recurring role
1995	Party of Five	Keri	
1995	Ned & Stacey	Veronica	
1995	Deadly Games	Jill Stewart	
1995	Homicide: Life on the Street	Officer Debbie Haskell	
1995	Touched by an Angel	Jennifer	
1995	Planet Rules		Unsold pilot
1995	Crazy Love	Sam	
1996	Champs	Dana	
1996	Murder, She Wrote	Carly McAllister	
1996	Beverly Hills, 90210	Melanie Harold	
1996	Full Circle	Averill Winslow	TV movie
1996	Lying Eyes	Jennifer	TV movie
1997	Spy Game	Maxine 'Max' London	Main cast
1997	Working	Jana	
1998	Michael Hayes	Andrea Jordan	
1998	Buddy Faro	Julie Barber	Main cast
1999	Wasteland	Jules	3 episodes
1999	St. Michael's Crossing	Tordio	
1999–2006	The West Wing	Mallory O'Brien	11 episodes
2000	Celebrity Homes	Herself	
2001	Family Law	Allison Palmer	
2001	Thieves	Agent Mary Webb	"The Long Con"
2001–02	Providence	Lynn Fischer	2 episodes
2002	The X-Files	Patti	"Trust No 1"
2003	ER	Denny	
2003	CSI: Crime Scene Investigation	Nancy Linden	
2004	Helter Skelter	Patricia Krenwinkel	TV movie
2005	Mystery Woman: Vision of a Murder	Debbie Philips	TV movie
2005	Ordinary Miracles	Sally's Mother	TV movie
2005	The Closer	Ellen	
2005	Close to Home	Cindy Delacroix	
2005	House	Kayla McGinley	
2005	Inconceivable	Clare	
2006	Without a Trace	Patient X	
2006	Scrubs	Millie	
2006	Ghost Whisperer	Lisa Filbert	
2006	Nip/Tuck	Kathleen McNamara	
2007	State of Mind	Mary Bridget Donohue	
2008	Cold Case	Simone Gallavan '78	
2008	Childrens Hospital	Nurse Allison	
2009	Trust Me	Laura Mink	
2010	Numb3rs	Sara Lewis	
2010	The Whole Truth	Corrine Sellards	
2011	CSI: Crime Scene Investigation	Mrs. Diorio	
2012	Family Guy		
2012	Perception	Laura Crane	
2020	Will & Grace	Molly McGann	

=== Film roles ===
Year	Title	Role	Notes
1993	Jason Goes to Hell: The Final Friday	Vicki	
1995	A Reason to Believe	Charlotte Byrne	
1996	Two Guys Talkin' About Girls	Rhonda Glick	Direct-to-video
1997	Switchback	Becky	
1998	Los años bárbaros	Susan	
2000	Terror Tract	Mary Ann Doyle	Segment: "Make Me An Offer"
2003	Holes	Linda Miller Walker	
2003	The Animatrix	Reporter	Direct-to-video, segment: "World Record" (voice role)
2006	Gillery's Little Secret	Bernadette	Short film
2006	Life After Tomorrow	Herself	Documentary film
2015	Larry Gaye: Renegade Male Flight Attendant	Larry's Mom	
