= The Price of Life (1987 film) =

- Directed by: Stephen Tolkin
- Written by: Stephen Tolkin
- Produced by: Jana Sue Memel
- Starring: Dana Andersen; Diana Bellamy; Roy Brocksmith; Ron Campbell; Dustin Diamond; Elizabeth Farley; John Fleck; Ray Galvin
- Cinematography: Jack Wallner
- Edited by: Sharyn L. Ross
- Music by: Ken Fix
- Release date: 1987
- Running time: 41 min.
- Country: United States
- Language: English

The Price of Life is a 1987 38-minute long American drama and science fiction film made by Chanticleer Films, directed by Stephen Tolkin and produced by Jana Sue Memel (story by Stephen Tolkin and Michel Monteaux). The film has music composed by Ken Fix. The film stars Dana Andersen, Diana Bellamy, Roy Brocksmith and Ron Campbell in the lead roles. It also features Fred Ward in a cameo.

== Premise and plot ==
The basic premise of the film is that a time account is physically linked to every infant at birth, with death automatic when the balance drops to zero. An elite upper-class is portrayed as living hundreds of years or more. The protagonist is given a certain amount of time as an infant, and as a young boy adds days and years to his time account by buying valuables from people and selling them to visiting tourists from the rich enclave. After his sister dies after gambling away her time, the protagonist (now a young man) sets out on a journey to the enclave of "the Old Ones" in order to save the life of his mother, who is (literally) running out of time. He gets there and meets a beautiful older woman who co-opts him into the immortal lifestyle.

== Later, similar work ==
The basic concept and basic plot elements of The Price of Life are practically identical to the later-made 2011 film In Time, which does not acknowledge being a remake of The Price of Life.

== Cast ==
- Dana Andersen as Alice
- Diana Bellamy as Mother
- Roy Brocksmith as The Old One
- Ron Campbell as Stiles
- Dustin Diamond as Young Stiles
- Elizabeth Farley as Customer
- John Fleck as Walter
- Ray Galvin as Old Man
- Willie Garson as Father
- Judy Geeson as Anthea
