= Roy Brocksmith =

American actor

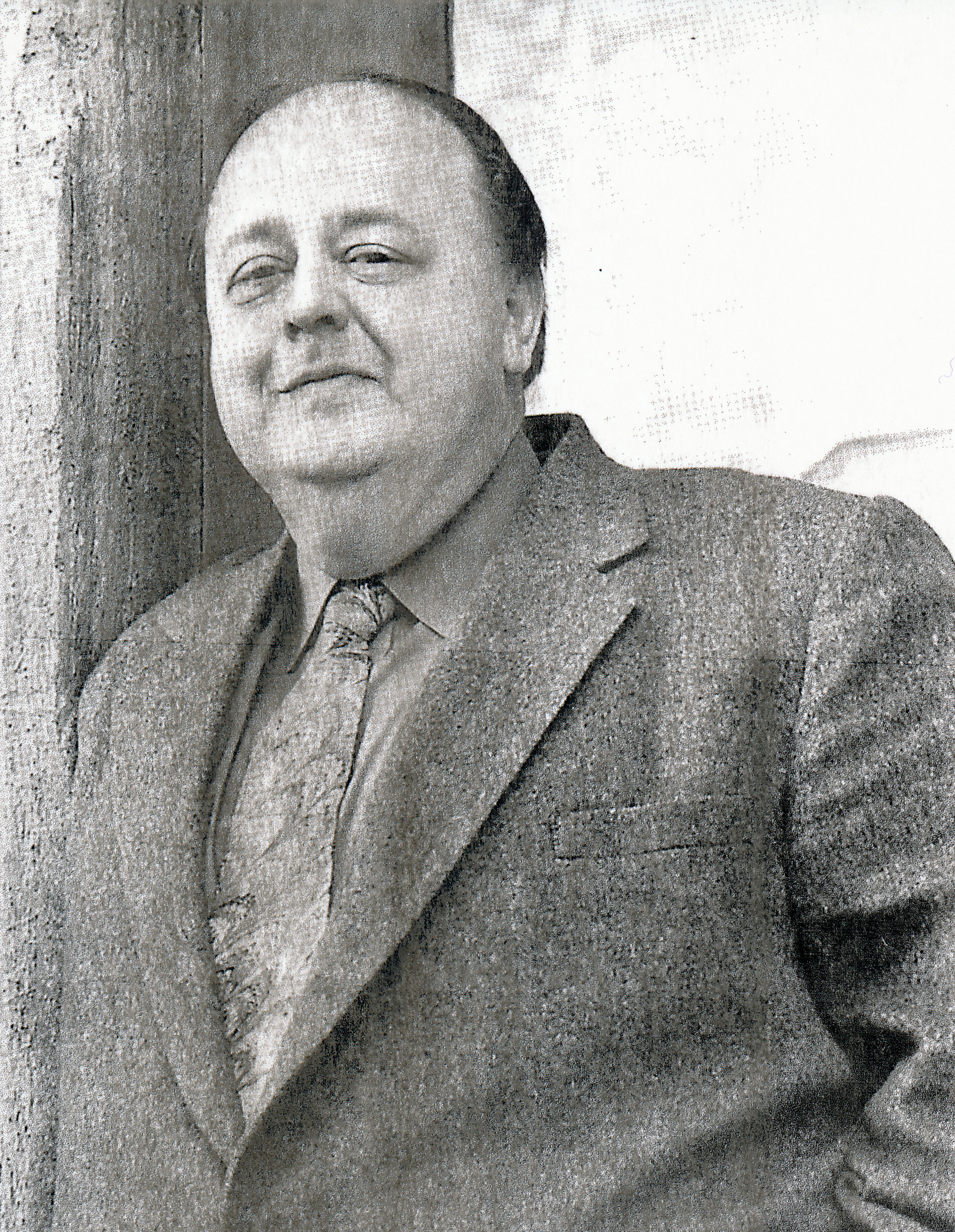
- Born: September 15, 1945; Quincy, Illinois, U.S.
- Died: December 16, 2001 (aged 56); Burbank, California, U.S.
- Occupation: Actor
- Years active: 1978–2000
- Spouse: Adele Albright (m. 1963)
- Children: 1

Roy Brocksmith (September 15, 1945 – December 16, 2001) was an American actor.

== Life and career ==
Brocksmith was born in Quincy, Illinois, the son of Vera Marguerite (née Hartwig) and Otis E. Brocksmith, who was a mechanic. He graduated from Quincy University in 1970. He then moved to New York City where he began a career on Broadway. His roles included Louis XIII in The Three Musketeers and the balladeer in a revival of The Threepenny Opera with Raul Julia.

Brocksmith's film and television roles included Dr. Edgemar in Total Recall, a police sergeant possessed by Bill in Bill & Ted's Bogus Journey, principal Michael Oslo in Picket Fences and mortician Irv Kendall in Arachnophobia.

He died in 2001, aged 56, from complications of diabetes.

== Filmography ==
=== Film ===
Year	Title	Role	Notes
1978	The Squeeze	Warehouse Owner	
1978	King of the Gypsies	Frinkuleschti	
1979	Killer Fish	Ollie	
1980	Stardust Memories	Dick Lobel	
1981	Wolfen	Fat Jogger In Park	
1981	Tales of Ordinary Madness	Barman	
1981	Rent Control	Stan	
1987	Who's That Girl	Crystal Salesman	
1988	The Price of Life	The Old One	
1988	Big Business	Dr. Parker	
1988	Scrooged	Mike, The Mailman	
1989	Relentless	The Coroner	
1989	Martians Go Home	Mr. Kornheiser	
1989	The War of the Roses	Mr. Fisk	
1989	Tango & Cash	FBI Agent Davis	
1990	Total Recall	Dr. Edgemar	
1990	Arachnophobia	Irv Kendall	
1991	Bill & Ted's Bogus Journey	Deputy James	
1992	Nickel & Dime	Sammy Thornton	
1994	The Hudsucker Proxy	Board Member	
1994	Lightning Jack	Junction City Tailor	
1994	Almost Dead	Kuranda	
1994	My Summer Story	Mr. Winchell, The Assessor	
1994	The Road to Wellville	Poultney Dab	
1997	Kull the Conqueror	Tu	
1998	Psycho	Man In Cowboy Hat Outside Realty Office	Uncredited

=== Television and guest roles ===
Year	Title	Role	Notes
1978	Tartuffe	Monsieur Loyal	TV movie
1979	Starstruck	Orthwaite Frodo	TV movie
1983	Jacobo Timerman: Prisoner Without a Name, Cell Without a Number	Unknown	TV movie
1983	3-2-1 Contact	Mr. Busby	Episodes in "The Bloodhound Gang" segments, including "The Case of the Veiled Thief" and "The Case of the Secret Message")
1984	The Streets	Unknown	TV movie
1985	Izzy & Moe	Sheriff Bledsoe	TV movie
1986	Silver Spoons	Mr. Fay	Episode: "Lost and Found"
1986	Newhart	Bidder	Episode: "Sweet and Sour Charity"
1987	227	Customer #1	Episode: "Got a Job"
1987	The Wizard	Soloman Marcus	Episode: "The Aztec Dagger"
1987	Almost Partners	Pierre La Rue	TV movie
1988	Webster	Bob	Episode: "The Cuckoo's Nest"
1988	Hunter	Clint Eastlake	Episode: "Boomerang"
1988	Sonny Spoon	Marvin Colchak	Episode: "Never Go to Your High School Reunion"
1988	The Van Dyke Show	Doctor	Episode: "Death Can Be Catching"
1988	Killer Instinct	Unknown	TV movie
1989	Night Court	Dr. Wiggle	Episode: "Yet Another Day in the Life"
1989	Star Trek: The Next Generation	Sirna Kolrami	Episode: "Peak Performance"
1989-1990	Tales from the Crypt	Doctor / The Bartender / Vic	3 episodes
1989-1990	It's Garry Shandling's Show	Mr. Guest	6 episodes
1990	Doogie Howser, M.D.	Guidance Counselor	Episode: "Academia Nuts"
1990	Father Dowling Mysteries	District Attorney	Episode: "The Reasonable Doubt Mystery"
1990	Hull High	Mr. Kelm	3 episodes
1990	Ann Jillian	Unknown	Episode: "Good Citizen Ann"
1986-1991	L.A. Law	IRS Agent Marv Fletcher	2 episodes
1991	American Playhouse	Old One	Episode: "Triple Play II"
1991	Vidiots	Zwertlow Cruntagg	TV movie
1991	Ferris Bueller	Mr. Carter	Episode: "A Night in the Life"
1991	The Wonder Years	Weird Mr. Lemkur	Episode: "Frank and Denise"
1991	Eerie, Indiana	Principal Togar	Episode: "Just say no to fun"
1991	Good & Evil	The Minister	Episode #1.6"
1991	Seinfeld	The Landlord	Episode: "The Nose Job"
1991	The Golden Girls	William	Episode: "Room Seven"
1992	Steel Justice	Colonel Edward Rollin Duggins	TV movie
1993	The Jackie Thomas Show	Chairman	Episode: "The Forces of Nature"
1993	Down the Shore	Judge	Episode: "Jail Bait"
1993	Coach	Judge	Episode: "Belly of the Beast"
1993	Lois & Clark: The New Adventures of Superman	Floyd	Episode: "Neverending Battle"
1994	Burke's Law	Cliff	Episode: "Who Killed the Starlet?
1994	The George Carlin Show	Charles	Episode: "George Destroys a Way of Life"
1995	Aaahh!!! Real Monsters	Footoo	Episode: "Where Have All the Monsters Gone?"
1995	A Walton Wedding	Professor Trumbell	TV movie
1995	White Dwarf	Guv'ner Twist	TV movie
1995	Star Trek: Deep Space Nine	Razka Karn	Episode: "Indiscretion"
1995-1996	Murder One	Dr. Elliott Matheson	2 episodes
1992-1996	Picket Fences	Principal Michael Oslo	20 episodes
1996	Nowhere Man	Bud Atkins	Episode: "Shine a Light on You"
1996	Pistol Pete	Bob "Pawnee Bob"	TV movie
1997	Grace Under Fire	Carl Huber	Episode: "Grace's New Job"
1997	Babylon 5	Brother Alwyn Macomber	Episode: "The Deconstruction of Falling Stars"
1998	Beyond Belief: Fact or Fiction	Casket Salesman	2 episodes
1999	Payne	Chef Henry Jambon	2 episodes
2000	Ally McBeal	Judge Raymond Norway (final appearance)	2 episodes
