= Lying Eyes =

1996 American television film

- Film poster of "Lying Eyes".
- Genre: Thriller
- Written by: Paul B. Margolis
- Directed by: Marina Sargenti
- Starring: Cassidy Rae; Vincent Irizarry; Jamie Rose; Allison Smith
- Theme music composer: Dennis McCarthy
- Country of origin: United States
- Original language: English

Production
- Executive producers: Chuck McLain; Charles Morales
- Producer: Suzy Beugen
- Editor: Nancy Morrison
- Running time: 97 minutes

Original release
- Network: National Broadcasting Company (NBC)
- Release: December 9, 1996

Lying Eyes is a 1996 American made-for-television thriller film starring Cassidy Rae, Vincent Irizarry, Allison Smith and Jamie Rose. It was directed by Marina Sargenti. The film first aired on the National Broadcasting Company network on December 9, 1996.

== Background ==
The film stars Cassidy Rae as Amy Miller, Vincent Irizarry as Derek Bradshaw, Jamie Rose as Elizabeth Bradshaw and Allison Smith as Jennifer. The film had a working title of Bed of Lies. It was filmed in California at Cupertino, Palo Alto, San Jose and the Los Gatos High School. Lying Eyes was produced by C.M. Two Production and Hearst Entertainment Productions.

In Sweden, the film debuted on January 10, 1999, whilst in the UK, the film wouldn't debut until November 19, 2004, although it was not actually released on VHS or DVD in the country. The film was originally released on VHS in America through Uav Corporation in 2001, with a DVD following in 2006 by Allumination, which used the same artwork as the VHS version. In April 2012, a new DVD version was issued by Fisher Klingenstein Films. In May 2012, the film was included on a "Mystery and Suspense" 4 DVD Collection set, also released by Fisher Klingenstein Films. This set included Lying Eyes as the first film, along with 1994's Visions of Terror, 1991's Face Value and 1986's Thompson's Last Run. In Brazil, the film was distributed by PlayArte Filmes.

== Plot ==
A 33-year-old lawyer, Derek Bradshaw courts and wins Amy Miller, an 18-year-old young and lively high school cheerleader. The slick lawyer is the epitome of creepiness: a straight-faced liar, a sneaky philanderer, and magnetically charismatic. He seduces Amy with romantic evenings and extravagant gifts much too adult for an 18-year-old. Amy's support system falters as she withdraws from her friends and her hard-working single mother, while a mystery stalker repeatedly threatens Amy's life. Is it Derek's suspicious wife Elizabeth, Amy's best friend Dana, a jealous ex-boyfriend, or some other anonymous competitor? When Amy finally acknowledges Derek's duplicity and attempts to end the affair, he won't let her off that easily, and the threats escalate as she becomes the victim of vicious pranks and ultimately, life-threatening attacks.

== Cast ==
- Cassidy Rae as Amy Miller
- Vincent Irizarry as Derek Bradshaw
- Allison Smith as Jennifer
- Jamie Rose as Elizabeth Bradshaw
- Ashlee Levitch as Dana
- Sherry Hursey as Ruth Miller
- Nancy Carlin as History teacher
- Richard Conti as Husband in Mansion
- James Coulter as Yuppie in Bar
- Katie Davis as Christie
- Kandeyce Jorden as Erin
- Lisa Rodríguez as Lauren
- Howard Swain as Detective Meyers
- Amber Van Lent as Derek's secretary
- Steve Zad as Andy

== Reception ==
Allmovie gave the film two out of five stars, where the reviewer Lisa Kropiewnicki described the film as a "romantic thriller", and stated "Director Marina Sargenti, who has a penchant for horror thrillers such as "Child of Darkness", "Child of Light" (1991) and "Mirror, Mirror" (1990), succeeds in building tension and creating some titillation in this "woman in jeopardy" thriller. However, while leads Cassidy Rae and Vincent Irizarry are blessed in the genes department, their story line is cliche-ridden trash. Trite dialogue, frustratingly stupid character decisions, an outdated soundtrack, and camera direction that's intended to be voyeuristic but comes off more like a spastic puppy-cam are just a few of the film's sins. Satisfaction is denied as the villain (skillfully played by Irizarry) never truly gets what he deserves, a hallowed hallmark of this benighted genre. For a more successful cheerleader fantasy, see the Academy Award-winning "American Beauty" (1999)."

On July 23, 1997, Fort Worth Star-Telegram described the film as "one of NBC's dozens of tossaway women-in-jeopardy dramas."
