= Child of Darkness, Child of Light =

1991 American TV movie

- VHS cover
- Genre: Horror
- Based on: Virgin by James Patterson
- Teleplay by: Brian Taggert
- Directed by: Marina Sargenti
- Starring: Anthony John Denison; Brad Davis; Paxton Whitehead; Claudette Nevins; Sydney Penny; Kristin Dattilo; Alan Oppenheimer; Eric Christmas; Richard McKenzie; Viveca Lindfors; Sela Ward
- Music by: Jay Gruska
- Country of origin: United States
- Original language: English

Production
- Producer: Paul Tucker
- Cinematography: Tobias Schliessler
- Editor: Glenn A. Morgan
- Running time: 75 minutes
- Production companies: G.C. Group; Wilshire Court Productions

Original release
- Network: USA Network
- Release: May 1, 1991

Child of Darkness, Child of Light is a 1991 American horror television film directed by Marina Sargenti, and starring Anthony John Denison, Brad Davis, and Claudette Nevins. It is based on the 1980 novel Virgin by James Patterson. The film follows a Catholic priest who goes to investigate two reported cases of virgin birth; one of God, and the other of the devil. The film was shot in Portland, Oregon, and premiered on the USA Network on May 1, 1991.

== Plot ==
Father Rosetti is sent by the Vatican to the small fictional city of Briscayne Falls in Pennsylvania to investigate a report of an impending virgin birth, but he is attacked on the road by mysterious bikers, making him crash and leaving him catatonic. In his place, Vatican sends Father Justin O'Carroll, not without warning him that seventy years before, the Virgin Mary appeared in an Italian village and left a message concerning the birth of a divine child at the end of the century.

After arriving in the city, O'Carroll meets a pregnant, poverty-stricken 15-year-old teen, Margaret Gallagher, who is bullied by her classmates for her claims of being a virgin. Margaret also has painful visions of people dying, and when a bully attempts to harass her, he suffers mysterious wounds. O'Carroll also finds out that an epidemic of polio is ravaging the country. When he returns to the Vatican, he learns that another girl claiming a virgin pregnancy, the wealthy Kathleen Beavier, has surfaced in Boston, being possibly the target of a second part of the prophecy, which talks about a child of Satan. O'Carroll finds that Kathleen's recent life mirrors exactly that of Margaret, and he is forced to investigate which girl will be the mother of which child.

Ultimately both girls give birth. Margaret gives birth to a boy, the Antichrist, while Kathleen gives birth to a girl, the Second Coming.

== Cast ==
- Anthony John Denison as Father Justin O'Carroll
- Brad Davis as Dr. Phinney
- Paxton Whitehead as Father Rosetti
- Claudette Nevins as Lenore Beavier
- Sydney Penny as Margaret Gallagher
- Kristin Dattilo as Kathleen Beavier
- Alan Oppenheimer as George Beavier
- Eric Christmas as Father Francesca
- Richard McKenzie as Father Guarini
- Viveca Lindfors as Ida Walsh
- Sela Ward as Sister Anne McCann
- Josh Lucas as John L. Jordan III
- John DeMita as Vatican Priest
- Mark Tassoni as Michael Sheedy
- Peter Holden as Michael's Gang
- Brendan Fraser as John's Friend
- Lindsey Smith-Sands as Little Girl
- Al Strobel as Dr. Seville

== Production ==
Filming took place in Portland, Oregon. The screenplay was written by Brian Taggert, based on the novel Virgin (later republished as Cradle and All) by James Patterson.

== Release ==
Child of Darkness, Child of Light premiered on USA Network on May 1, 1991. The movie was later given a home video release on VHS.

== Reception ==
Upon its release, Variety criticized the film in their review, stating that the only frightening thing about the film was "how spiritless and ill-crafted it is." The Los Angeles Times also reviewed the film, commenting that "Unlike its Beastly predecessors in apocalyptic cinema, "Child" won't scare anyone into the clutches of the church, but may inspire paroxysms of that divine healing force, laughter."

In 2025 Dave Wain reviewed Child of Darkness, Child of Light for his website, praising the film's score and the acting of Lindfors, while criticizing the dialogue.
