= Georgina Lightning =

Canadian film director and writer (1963–2026)

- Born: July 4, 1963; Edmonton, Alberta, Canada
- Died: September 5, 2026 (aged 63); Enoch Cree Nation, Alberta, Canada
- Occupations: Director, screenwriter, actress
- Notable work: Older Than America
- Children: 3, including Crystle and Cody

Georgina Lightning (July 4, 1963 – September 5, 2026) was a Canadian First Nations film director, screenwriter and actress.

In 2007, she was featured in Filmmaker Magazine as one of 25 New Faces of Independent Film. In 2010 she was the recipient of the "White House Project- Epic-Award for Emerging Artist". She co-founded Tribal Alliance Productions, partnering with executive producer Audrey Martinez, as a means to create opportunities for Native American, First Nations, and other Indigenous filmmakers.

In 2008, Lightning directed, wrote, and starred in the supernatural thriller film Older than America, becoming the first North American Indigenous Woman to direct a major feature film. The film won several major awards at film festivals. She based the film on her father's experience with the Canadian Indian residential school system and other personal family stories.

Lightning was an outspoken advocate for First Nations and Native American causes, working towards a greater appreciation and awareness of the intrinsic value of North American Indigenous cultures to not only Indigenous people themselves, but to society in general. In 2020, she criticized the TV show Big Sky due its lack of cultural sensitivity to the Indigenous community.

Her three children are either currently or previously working actors. They are Crystle Lightning, Cody Lightning, and William Lightning.

At the 9th Canadian Screen Awards in 2021, she received a nomination for Best Supporting Actress in a Drama Series for her performance in Trickster.

== Early life and education ==
Georgina Lightning was born in Edmonton, Alberta on July 4, 1963, and came from the Samson Cree Nation. Although her family maintained strong cultural ties, she spent her childhood in the city rather than on the reserve. As a child, Lightning recalled growing up with Indigenous cultural teachings or spiritual guidance as a loss that resulted in feelings of shame and even self-hatred toward her identity.

Before entering the entertainment industry, Lightning worked extensively in childcare, first with teenagers in youth programs and later with young children in daycare settings. Her close relationships with the children she cared for, particularly those whose deaths left a profound emotional impact, shaped her awareness of community needs and later guided her filmmaking.

In the years that followed, Lightning enrolled at the Alberta University of Fine Arts, though after a year she chose to leave and pursue her acting career on a larger and more ambitious scale. In 1990, she moved to Los Angeles, CA with her three children to study at the American Academy of Dramatic Arts, where she earned the Michael Toma Award for most-improved actor and was invited to join the Academy's repertory company. This period was also marked by her survival of domestic violence, an experience that had a profound impact on her life and shaped her later dedication to advocacy and community-centered storytelling.

== Career ==
Lightning's professional path included acting, directing, producing, coaching and cultural consulting. After completing her training in Los Angeles, she entered Hollywood at a time when few substantive roles existed for Indigenous performers and looking back, Lightning recalled that agents often limited her auditions for narrowly defined Native-Specific characters, many of which featured minimal dialogue or stereotypical depictions. Her attempts to be considered for complex roles, regardless of whether they were written as Indigenous, were often dismissed by her agent and other Hollywood filmmakers, reinforcing the restrictive racial politics of casting that Native actors continue to face. These challenges, along with the difficulty of finding representation willing to advocate for her beyond typecast roles, motivated Lightning to broaden her work behind the camera.

Over the next several years, Lightning became involved in multiple aspects of film production, assisting with Native casting, producing independent projects, consulting on cultural content, and helping raise funds for Indigenous-focused films. She also supported initiatives such as the Sundance Native Program. This expansion of her creative practice ultimately led to her feature directorial debut, Older Than America (2008), a film inspired by stories from family and community members affected by boarding schools. The film earned more than twenty festival awards, including recognition for directing and acting, and its success marked a milestone in Indigenous women's filmmaking.

Lightning also spoke about the challenges of collaborating with Non-Indigenous industry professionals in Hollywood. She explained that writing teams with unfamiliar Indigenous worldviews often required extensive explanation, what she described as "Indian 101", before they could understand the cultural context of a story. Despite these efforts, she frequently found that Indigenous perspectives were misunderstood or misrepresented in early script drafts, underscoring the disconnect between Native experiences and mainstream assumptions.

In addition to her directing work, Lightning continued to act in both film and television. Her performance in the series Trickster (2020), earned her a nomination for Best Supporting Actress at the 2021 Canadian Screen Awards. Across her career, she remained committed to increasing Indigenous involvement in media creation, promoting equitable opportunities, and challenging the systemic obstacles that shaped her own early experiences in Hollywood.

== Styles and themes ==
Lightning's creative work frequently explores the intergenerational impact of colonial policies on Indigenous families and communities. Her storytelling blends elements of supernatural thriller, gothic imagery, and psychological drama with Indigenous worldviews and ceremonial practices. In Older Than America (2008), she uses visions, hauntings and the metaphor of institutionalization to address the trauma of residential and boarding schools, emphasizing both historical harm and the potential for cultural healing.

She also spoke about the importance of making "media that matters," framing her filmmaking as a form of testimony and education for audiences that are unfamiliar with Indigenous histories. Her narratives draw on personal and familial experiences, including her father's trauma as a boarding school survivor, the losses experienced in her community, and her own encounters with cycles of abuse. Lightning's work consistently foregrounds Indigenous women's perspectives, community resilience, and the importance of reconnecting with cultural practices as part of the healing process.

== Activism and advocacy ==
In addition to her creative roles, Lightning was active in efforts to expand Indigenous participation in film and media. She co-founded Tribal Alliance Productions (TAP), a Native-owned company that promotes Indigenous storytelling and supports creators across all stages of production. The company also works in partnership with organizations such as the Confederation of Oklahoma Tribes, with the goal of building long-term infrastructure and widening opportunities for Indigenous filmmakers.

Lightning also helped establish Native Media Network, an organization focused on promoting Native talent and fostering Indigenous media representation. Through both formal initiatives and public speaking, she advocated for cultural sovereignty, environmental and human rights, and the visibility of Indigenous narratives. She also voiced support for social movements including Idle No More and commented on recent shifts in the film industry, noting increased attention to gender equity and the rise of Indigenous-led film projects.

== Death ==
Lightning was killed in an equestrian accident at a rodeo event on the Enoch Cree reservation, on September 5, 2026, at the age of 63.

== Filmography ==
Lightning worked in the film and entertainment industry for more than three decades, building a career that spans acting, directing, producing, and cultural consulting. Throughout this time, she contributed to a wide range of film and television projects, both in front and behind the camera. Her Filmography reflects the scope of her experience and her long-standing commitment to expanding Indigenous representation in Media:

- Happily Ever After: Fairy Tales for Every Child (1995 as Morning Dove)
- Yellow Wooden Ring (1998 as Sissy Blea)
- Pocahontas II: Journey to a New World (1998 as an "additional voice")
- My Brother (1999 as Mother)
- Walker, Texas Ranger (TV, 1998-1999, two episodes, in Way of the Warrior as Sundance, and War Cry as Ellen Crow Feather)
- Backroads (2000 as Mary Lou)
- Johnny Greyeyes (2000 as Georgina)
- Christmas in the Clouds (2001 as Louise)
- Cowboy Up (2001 as Brenda)
- The West Wing (TV, 2001, as Maggie Morningstar Charles in the episode The Indians in the Lobby)
- Auf Wiedersehen, Pet (TV, 2002, as Lainie Proudfoot in four episodes: An Inspector Calls, Another Country, A Bridge too Far, and Bridge Over Troubled Water)
- Dreamkeeper (TV, 2003 as Crystal Heart, also as associate producer)
- Sawtooth (2004 as Lucy, also as executive producer and producer)
- Hanbleceya (2005 as co-producer)
- Ghosts of the Heartland (2007 as Tani)
- Older than America (2008 as director, writer, and as lead actress portraying the character Rain)
- Blackstone (TV series, 2011, as Tracy Bull in the first season)
- Land (Western Drama Film, 2018, portraying Bettie)
- Trickster (TV series, 2020)
- Pipe Nation (Canadian TV series, 2021)
- Three Pines (TV series, 2022, as Arisawe Two-Rivers)
- The Wind & the Reckoning (Western Drama Film, 2022, as an executive producer)
- Department of Paranormal Affairs (TV Mini Series, 2024, portraying Minister)
- Die My Love (Thriller Comedy Film, 2025, portraying Kathleen the Orderly)

== Awards and nominations ==
Lightning's contributions to Film and Television have been acknowledged through several major awards and nominations over the course of her career. In 2007, she was named one of the Filmmaker's Magazine, "25 New Faces of Independent Film", highlighting her emergence as a significant Indigenous filmmaker. Her debut directorial film, Older Than America (2008), earned more than 25 festival awards including Best Director and Best Supporting Actor at the American Indian Film Festival.

In 2010, Lightning received the White House Project's Epic Award for Emerging Artist, honoring her achievements as a director and her advocacy for Indigenous representation in media. She was also recognized for her acting work. At the 9th Canadian Screen Awards in 2021, where she earned another nomination for Best Supporting Actress in a Drama Series for her performance in the CBC television series Trickster.
