= Elias Irizarry =

US Department of Defense official

Personal details
- Born: November 2001 (age 24–25) New Jersey, U.S
- Party: Republican
- Relatives: Vincent Irizarry (father)
- Education: The Citadel (BS)

Elias Irizarry (born November 2001) is an American political appointee serving in the United States Department of Defense in the Special Operations and Low Intensity Conflict office, which oversees highly classified military operations. Irizarry entered the United States Capitol during the January 6 United States Capitol attack, and had pleaded guilty and was convicted of entering in a restricted building, and was sentenced to 14 days in jail.

== Early life and education ==
Irizarry is from Montclair, New Jersey. He attended Montclair High School before moving to Fort Mill, South Carolina and graduating from Nation Ford High School.

=== January 6 United States Capitol attack ===
At the time of the Capitol attack, Irizarry was 19 and attended The Citadel military college in South Carolina, alongside being a cadet in the Civil Air Patrol.

According to prosecutors, Irizarry entered United States Capitol through an open window, while wielding a metal pole. He subsequently pleaded guilty to a misdemeanor charge of entering and remaining in a restricted building or grounds. During his sentencing in 2023, he disavowed his involvement in the attacks, stating "I am ashamed because I will always be a part of this disgrace."

== Career ==
=== 2024 South Carolina state house of representatives primary ===
In 2024, Irizarry filed to run as a candidate in the South Carolina Republican primary for the state’s House District 43, losing to state representative Randy Ligon. He received 27.9% of the vote despite receiving just over one-tenth of the campaign funds secured by his opponent.

=== Second Trump administration ===
In January 2025, Irizarry was pardoned by President Trump, along with over 1,500 other participants of the attack.

During the Second Trump Administration, Irizarry was hired by the Department of Defense as a political appointee. In June 2026, The Washington Post reported that Irizarry was serving in the Special Operations and Low Intensity Conflict office, which "manages highly classified military operations". Irizarry is attached to a counterterrorism and irregular warfare team, with responsibilities that include security for US diplomatic missions, hostage rescue, and personnel recovery.

The Pentagon confirmed his appointment, with Pentagon Press Secretary Joel Valdez writing on X that Irizarry is a "qualified, patriotic young professional and we are proud to have him as a political appointee at the Department of War."

Following the publication of the Post's investigation, Senator Mark Warner, the lead Democrat on the Senate Intelligence Committee, wrote on social media, "This administration thinks a convicted Jan. 6 rioter should be doing that kind of work?????"
