= The Last Chance Detectives =

- The Last Chance Detectives logo
- Running time: 25 minutes
- Country of origin: United States
- Language: English
- Syndicates: Focus on the Family
- Starring: Adam Wylie; Mae Whitman; AJ Noel; Daryl Sabara
- Announcer: Brian Cummings
- Created by: Robert Vernon
- Written by: John Fornof; Robert Vernon; Marshal Younger
- Recording studio: Burbank, California
- No. of episodes: 12
- Website: LastChanceDetectives.com

The Last Chance Detectives is a series of Christian television movies, and later a radio drama series created by Robert Vernon and produced by Focus on the Family in the mid-1990s. The production of each video episode cost approximately one million USD. The series focused on four preteen "sleuths" who solve mysteries in their fictional small town of Ambrosia, Arizona. When the radio shows were airing, Canyon Quest, a prequel book to the show, was released.

== Plot ==
12-year-old Mike Fowler lives in the fictional small town of Ambrosia, Arizona with his apparently widowed mother and his paternal grandparents. The family runs the Last Chance Gas and Diner highway stop near the town's municipal limits, as well as the small hangar and airstrip nearby. The diner property is also home to the Lady Liberty, a B-17 Bomber flown by Mike's grandfather in World War II; it is in the plane that Mike and his three friends—Ben Jones, Winona "Winnie" Whitefeather, and Spencer "Spence" Williams– run their detective agency called the "Last Chance Detectives". Together, they solve mysteries and have adventures, while learning Christian morals.

== Radio albums ==
The radio series included a brand new cast, and Jason Whittaker, from Adventures in Odyssey in the first album. Both made by Focus on the Family, the two series were partially joined for this series. Three albums were created:

- The Last Chance Detectives: The Day Ambrosia Stood Still
- The Last Chance Detectives: Mystery of the Lost Voices
- The Last Chance Detectives: Last Flight of the Dragon Lady

== Film series ==
Escape from Fire Lake's cover

The Last Chance Detectives television films were filmed at Kingman Airport in Kingman, Arizona. Focus on the Family Films paid $3,000 to lease the land to film it there. There were three films created:

- The Last Chance Detectives: Mystery Lights of Navajo Mesa
- The Last Chance Detectives: Legend of the Desert Bigfoot
- The Last Chance Detectives: Escape from Fire Lake

== Book series ==
- Book #1: The Last Chance Detectives: Canyon Quest
- Book #2: The Last Chance Detectives: Mystery Lights of Navajo Mesa
- Book #3: The Last Chance Detectives: Legend of the Desert Bigfoot
- Book #4: The Last Chance Detectives: Escape from Fire Lake
- Book #5: The Last Chance Detectives: Terror from Outer Space
- Book #6: The Last Chance Detectives: Revenge of the Phantom Hot Rod
- Book #7: The Last Chance Detectives: Quest for the King's Crown
- Book #8: The Last Chance Detectives: The Curse of Calamity Wells

== Characters ==
- Mike Fowler: Mike's father and grandfather both served in the Air Force as pilots. Mike's family is the most examined in the series—when he was six (according to the opening of the first video episode, Mystery Lights of Navajo Mesa), his father was listed by the airforce as "Missing in Action" after the aircraft he was flying exploded in midflight. While it appears that he has died in the video episodes, the radio episodes indicate that Mike's father may still be alive, and merely suffering from a case of amnesia sustained after ejecting from the plane. Mike is the leader of the group having formed the Last Chance Detectives as a way to hone his detective skills in the hope that one day he might find his dad. He is rarely seen without his leather flight jacket, pocket Bible and the compass his dad gave him the last time they were together. In the film series he was played by Ryan Calhoun. In the radio series, he was voiced by Adam Wylie.
- Winnona "Winnie" Whitefeather: Eleven-year-old Winnie lives on the Navajo reservation with her family and helps out at her Grandmother's trading post. Winnie is a talented artist - especially when it comes to sketching. According to Mike, she has a temper like Donald Duck. She knows the desert like the back of her hand and is an expert on Navajo traditions and folklore. She finds cases for the team to solve, and is often involved in conflict with Ben. In the film series, Winnie was played by Crystle Lightning. In the radio series, she was voiced by Mae Whitman.
- Spence Martin: Spence is the group's technical expert who spends his time refurbishing electronic devices (most of which are found in the B-17) for use in solving cases. His father is a geologist working in the vicinity. Even though he is the youngest of the group, Spence serves as the voice of reason of the group and uses his genius and creativity to solve problems. In the film series Spence was played by David Netter. In the radio series, he was voiced by AJ Noel. He is the only black character in the show.
- Ben Jones: Ben is somewhat lazy, overweight, and reads comic books when he's not playing video games. He comes up with wild conspiracy theories and speaks in a highly animated way. He's certainly not the bravest of the gang and often jumps at his own shadow. He's Mike's loyal best friend, but often clashes with Winnie. Ben's parents own the Wig-Wam Motor Motel where he sometimes is forced to help out. In the film series Ben was played by Davin Carey. In the radio series, he was voiced by Daryl Sabara.

== Airings ==
The Last Chance Detectives currently airs on JellyTelly and KDSO-LD the Dove TV.
