= Kanad =

- town
- Location in Madhya Pradesh, India Kanad (India)
- Coordinates: 23°40′10″N 76°9′49″E
- Country: India
- State: Madhya Pradesh
- District: Agar Malwa

Population (2001)
  - Total: 8,650

Languages
  - Official: Hindi, Malwi
- Time zone: UTC+5:30 (IST)
- PIN: 465230
- Telephone code: 07362

Kanad is a town and a nagar parishad in Agar Malwa district in the Indian state of Madhya Pradesh. It comes under Kanad Parishad. It belongs to Ujjain Division and is along the Agar–Sarangpur SH-41 highway, 18 km (11 mi) east of the district headquarters of Agar Malwa.

== Climate ==
The town observes three distinct seasons: summer, monsoon and winter.

Summers start in mid-March and can be extremely hot in April and May. The daytime temperatures can touch 42 °C (108 °F) on more than one occasion. Average summer temperatures may go as high as 40 °C (104 °F) but humidity is very low.

Winters are moderate and usually dry. Lower temperatures can go as low as 4 °C (39 °F)-6 °C (43 °F) on some nights. Usually the temperature ranges between 8 and 26 °C during winters.

Rains are due to southwest monsoons. The typical monsoon season goes from 15 June till mid-September, contributing 32–35 inches of annual rains. About 95% of rains occur during monsoon season.

Kanad gets moderate rainfall of 20 to 24 inches (510 to 610 mm) during July–September due to the southwest monsoon.

== Demographics ==
As of 2001 India census, Kanad had a population of 8,650. Males constitute 52% of the population and females 48%. Kanad has an average literacy rate of 61%, higher than the national average of 59.5%. Male literacy is 73%, and female literacy is 48%. In Kanad, 17% of the population is under 6 years of age.
