= Nicolas-François Canard =

French mathematician, philosopher and economist

- Born: c. 1750; Sézanne, France
- Died: 1833; Moulins, Allier, France
- Scientific career
- Fields: Economics mathematics

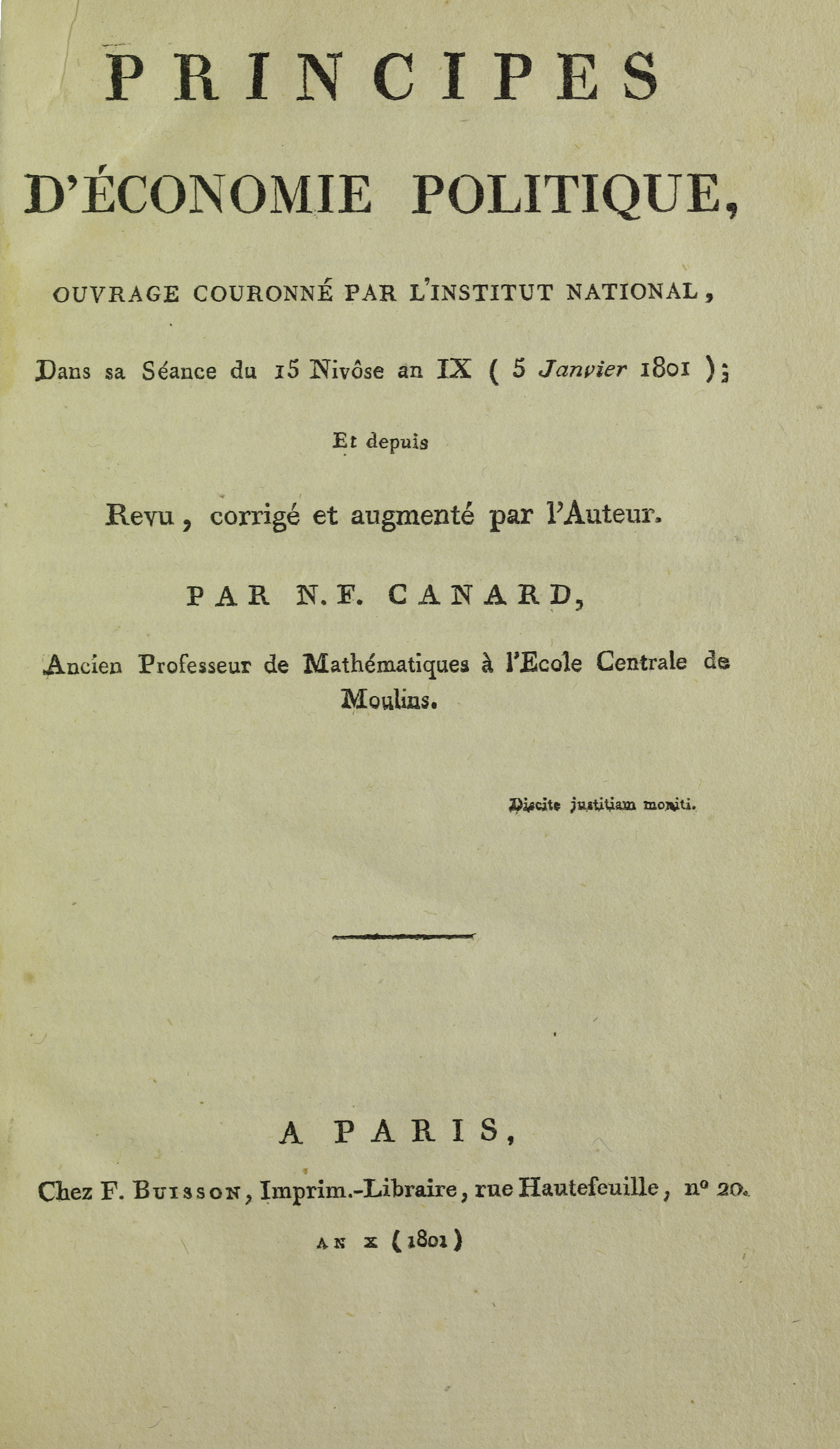
Principes d'économie politique

Nicolas-François Canard (French: [kanaʁ]; c. 1750 – 1833) was a French mathematician, philosopher and economist. He was one of the pioneers of applying mathematics to economic problems, foreshadowing the works of Antoine Augustin Cournot, William Stanley Jevons, and others.
