= Brent Spiner =

American actor (born 1949)

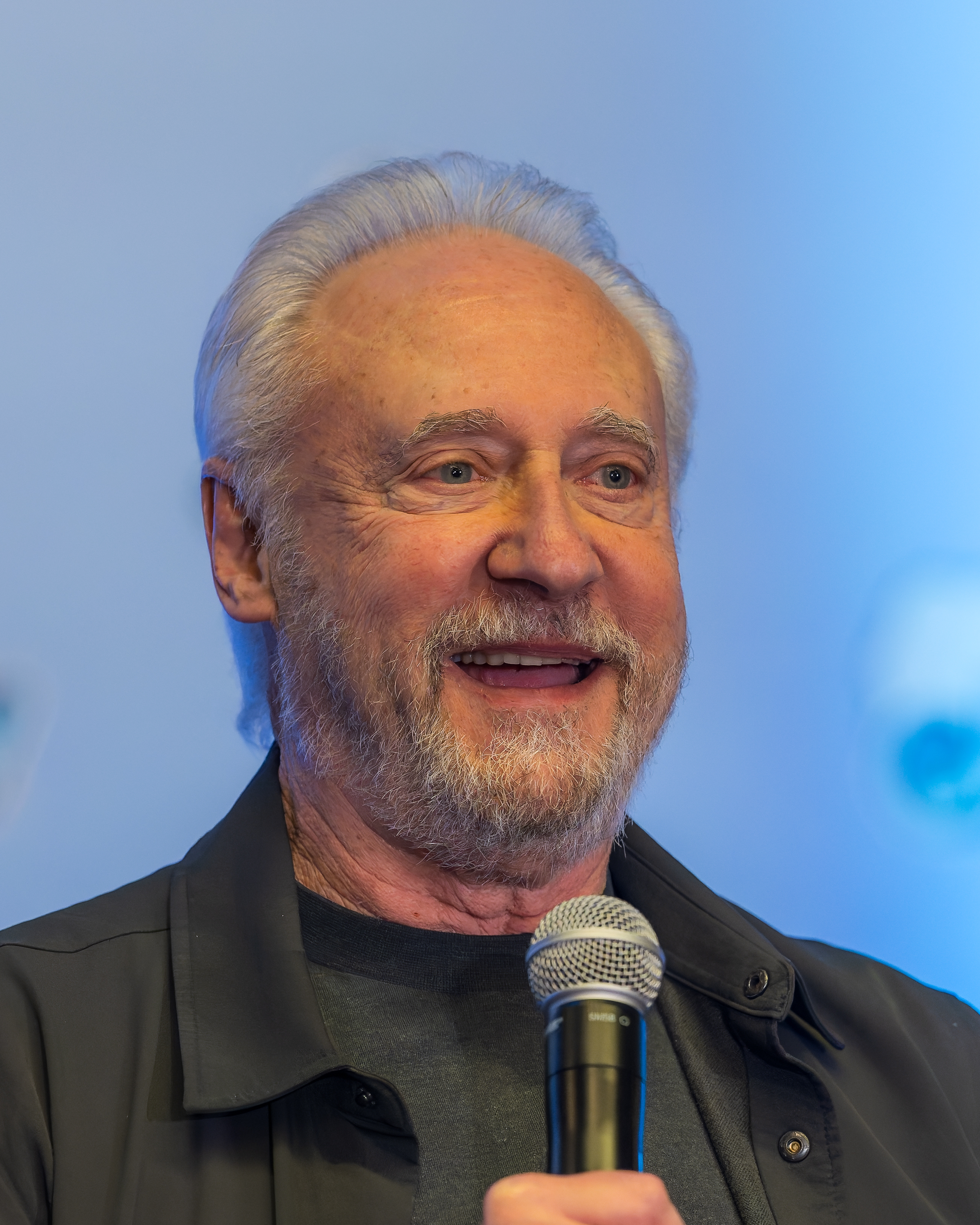
- Spiner at GalaxyCon San Jose in 2026
- Born: Brent Jay Spiner; February 2, 1949 (age 77); Houston, Texas, U.S.
- Other name: Brent Jay Mintz (1955–1975)
- Occupation: Actor
- Years active: 1968–present
- Notable credit: Lt. Cdr. Data in the Star Trek franchise
- Spouse: Loree McBride
- Children: 1

Brent Jay Spiner (/ˈspaɪnər/; born February 2, 1949) is an American actor best known for his role as the android Data on the television series Star Trek: The Next Generation (1987–1994), four subsequent films (1994–2002), and Star Trek: Picard (2020–2023). In 1997, he won the Saturn Award for Best Supporting Actor for his portrayal of Data in Star Trek: First Contact, and was nominated in the same category for portraying Dr. Brackish Okun in Independence Day, a role he reprised in Independence Day: Resurgence. Spiner has also enjoyed a career in the theater and as a musician. He is also known for voicing the Joker in the animated series Young Justice (2011–2022).

== Early life ==
Brent Jay Spiner was born on February 2, 1949, in Houston, Texas, to Jewish parents Sylvia Schwartz and Jack Spiner, who owned a furniture store. When Spiner was ten months old, Jack Spiner died of kidney failure at age 29. Subsequently, he was adopted by his mother's second husband, Sol Mintz, whose surname he used between 1955 and 1975.

Spiner attended Bellaire High School in Bellaire, Texas. He became active on the Bellaire speech team, winning the national championship in dramatic interpretation. He attended the University of Houston, where he performed in local theater; he left without a degree. In 1968, he worked as a performer at Six Flags AstroWorld, first as a gunfighter, then in Dr. Featherflowers' Medicine Show with his friend Trey Wilson, with whom he alternated as Dr. Featherflowers. Spiner also performed the role in the 1968 TV special The Pied Piper of Astroworld.

== Career ==
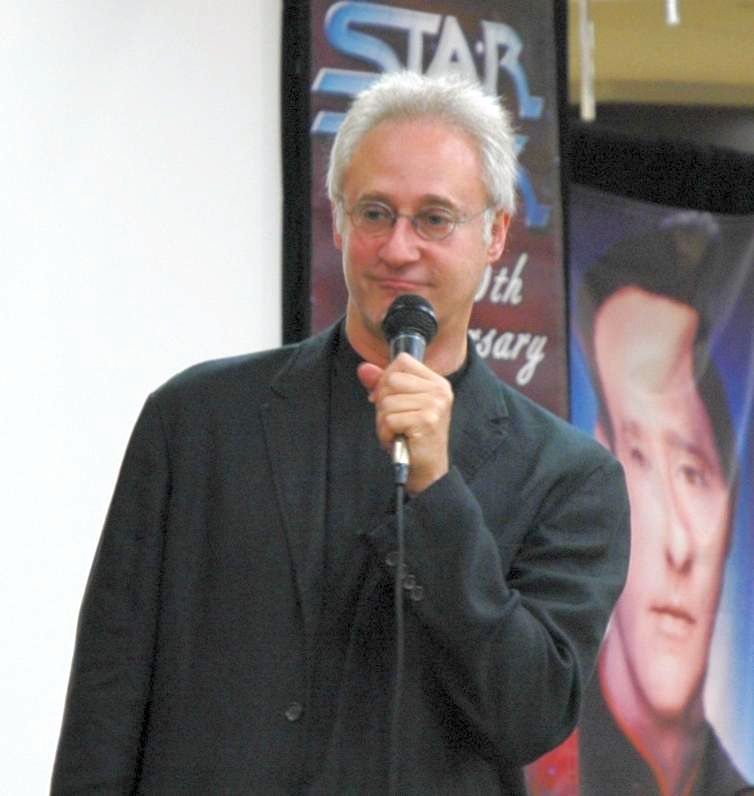
Spiner in 2005

=== Early work ===
Spiner moved to New York City in the early 1970s, where he became a stage actor, performing in several Broadway and off-Broadway plays, including The Three Musketeers and Stephen Sondheim's Sunday in the Park with George. As Brent Mintz, he appeared as an imposter on a 1972 episode of the popular game show To Tell the Truth. He had a brief non-speaking role in the film Stardust Memories, credited as Fan in Lobby, the one with a Polaroid. Also within that 1980 Woody Allen film, Spiner can be seen as a passenger on the train full of misfits that the Allen character is trapped on in one of the films-within-the-film. In 1974, he appeared in two consecutive episodes of All My Children as an accountant who brought Nick Davis the news that Nick had inherited money from one of his dance students.

Spiner appeared as a media technician in "The Advocates", a second-season episode of the Showtime cable series The Paper Chase. In 1984, he moved to Los Angeles, where he appeared in several pilots and television films. He played a recurring character on Night Court, Bob Wheeler, patriarch of a rural family. In 1986, he played a condemned soul in "Dead Run", an episode of the revival of Rod Serling's series The Twilight Zone on CBS. He made two appearances in season three (1986) of the situation comedy Mama's Family, as two different characters. His first and only starring film role was in Rent Control (1984). In the Cheers episode "Never Love a Goalie, Part II", he played acquitted murder suspect Bill Grand. He also appeared in the Tales from the Darkside episode "A Case of the Stubborns" as a preacher, and portrayed Jim Stevens in the television film Manhunt for Claude Dallas.

Spiner guest-starred in Friends as James Campbell, a man who interviews Rachel Green for Gucci.

=== Star Trek ===
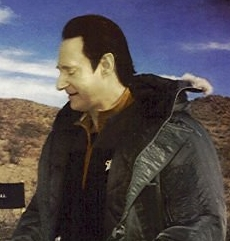
Spiner as Data on the set of Star Trek: Nemesis

In 1987, Spiner was cast as android Starfleet officer Lieutenant Commander Data on Star Trek: The Next Generation, which spanned seven seasons and four feature films. He appeared as Data in all but one of the series' 178 episodes, and reprised his role in the spin-off films Star Trek Generations (1994), Star Trek: First Contact (1996), Star Trek: Insurrection (1998), and Star Trek: Nemesis (2002). Although billed as the final Trek film for the TNG cast, the ambiguous ending of Nemesis suggested a possible avenue for the return of Data. However, Spiner felt he was too old to continue playing the part, as Data does not age. He also played Lore, Data's evil android brother, in several Next Generation episodes; and B-4, another brother android with a less developed mind, in Nemesis.

In 2004, Spiner returned to Star Trek as Dr. Arik Soong, an ancestor of Data's creator Dr. Noonien Soong, whom he also played in a three-episode story arc of Star Trek: Enterprise: "Borderland", "Cold Station 12", and "The Augments".

Spiner also recorded dialogue as Data that was heard in the final episode of Star Trek: Enterprise, "These Are the Voyages...", which aired in 2005.

Eighteen years after last appearing as Data, he reprised the role in the 2020 Star Trek series Star Trek: Picard as well as that of Dr. Altan Inigo Soong, the son of Data's creator. Spiner said that he does not intend to play Data again, though he might be open to playing Altan Soong. In Season 2, he plays another of Noonien Soong's ancestors, Dr. Adam Soong. In Season 3 of Picard, he simultaneously played Noonien Soong, B4, Lore, and a version of Data that was designed to feel emotions and naturally use verbal contractions, which the original Data could not do.

In addition to the series and films, Spiner voiced his character in several Star Trek video games, including Star Trek: Generations, Star Trek: The Next Generation – A Final Unity, Star Trek: Hidden Evil, Star Trek: Away Team, and Star Trek: Bridge Commander.

=== Music and stage ===
In 1991, Spiner recorded an album of 1940s pop standards, Ol' Yellow Eyes Is Back, the title of which was a play on the yellow contact lenses Spiner wore as Data, and the title of a Frank Sinatra record, Ol' Blue Eyes Is Back. In 1997, he returned to Broadway as John Adams in the Roundabout Theater Company revival of the musical 1776, whose production was nominated for a Tony Award. A cast recording was released.

=== After Star Trek ===
Spiner has appeared in many television series, including Deadly Games, The Blacklist, Dream On, Gargoyles, Law & Order: Criminal Intent, Mad About You and The Outer Limits. In the series The Big Bang Theory and Joey, he appeared as himself. He has acted in the films The Aviator; Dude, Where's My Car?; I Am Sam; Independence Day; Independence Day: Resurgence; The Master of Disguise; Out to Sea; Phenomenon; The Ponder Heart; and South Park: Bigger, Longer and Uncut. His television-film appearances during this period include the 2000 musical Geppetto and the role of Dorothy Dandridge's manager and confidant, Earl Mills, in the HBO production Introducing Dorothy Dandridge.

In 2005, Spiner appeared in a short-lived science-fiction television series Threshold, which was canceled in November of that year after 13 episodes. In 2006, he appeared in a feature film comedy, Material Girls, with Hilary and Haylie Duff.

In the Frasier episode "Lilith Needs a Favor", Spiner made two brief cameos as a fellow airline passenger with Frasier Crane's ex-wife, Lilith Sternin.

In March 2008, Spiner performed alongside Maude Maggart in a radio show/musical, Dreamland, which was released as a CD album.

In 2008, Spiner played Dr. Strom in the feature film parody Superhero Movie. In February 2009, he played William Quint in "The Juror #6 Job", an episode of the drama series Leverage directed by his Next Generation co-star Jonathan Frakes. That same year, he voiced himself in the Family Guy episode "Not All Dogs Go to Heaven".

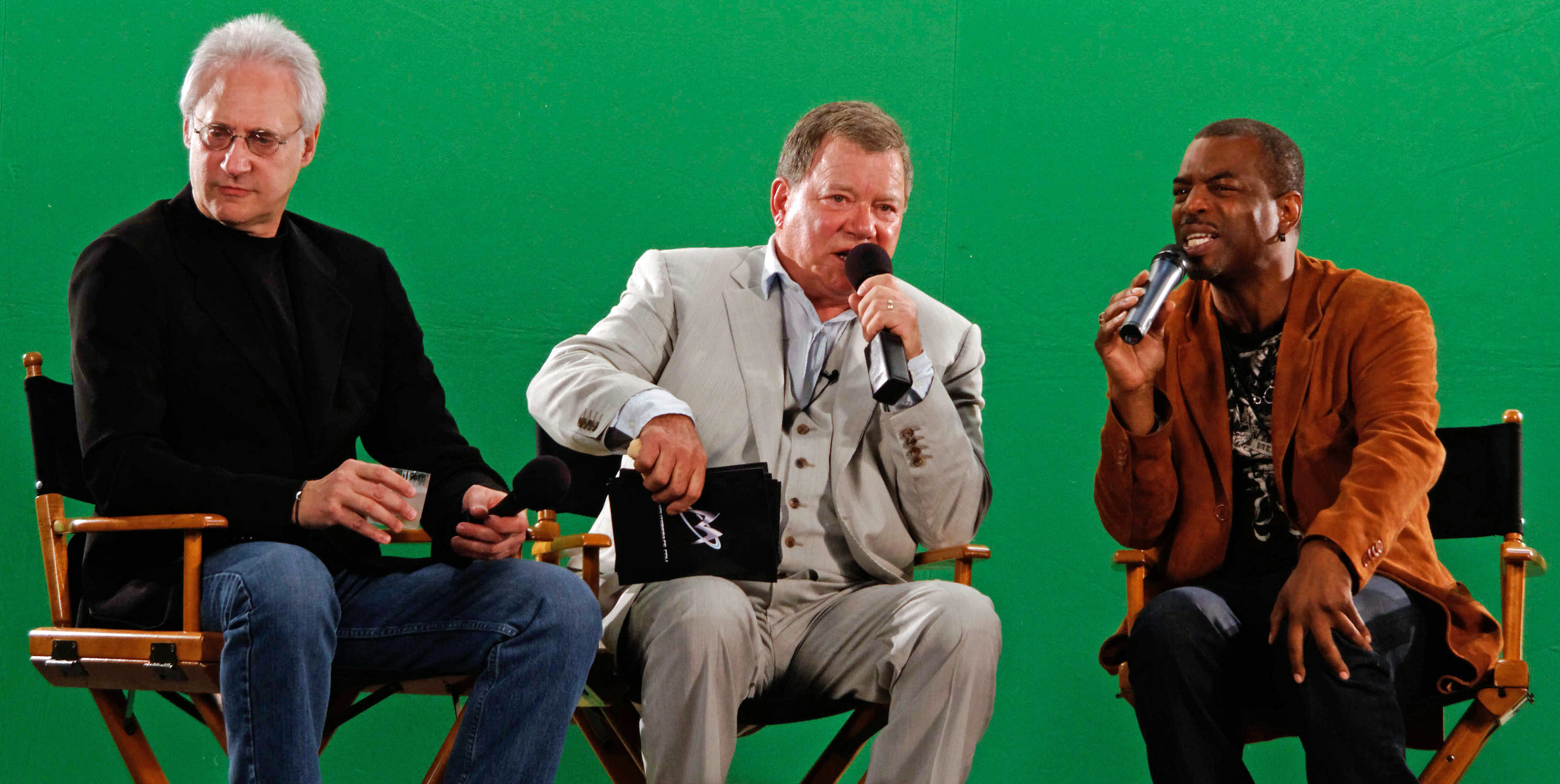
Spiner with William Shatner and LeVar Burton at Comic-Con in San Diego (July 2010).

On January 13, 2010, Spiner and fellow Star Trek: The Next Generation actor LeVar Burton appeared on TWiT.tv's coverage of the Consumer Electronics Show.

In April 2011, Spiner began starring in Fresh Hell, a comic webseries in which he plays a version of himself, attempting to put his career back together after falling out of the limelight.

Spiner appeared as Dr. Kern in the September 12, 2011, episode of the Syfy channel program Alphas entitled "Blind Spot". In October 2011, he appeared as himself in the episode "The Russian Rocket Reaction" of The Big Bang Theory. The day after his guest appearance, it was announced that Spiner would guest-star in the Young Justice episode "Revelation", providing the voice of the Joker. Spiner has also guest-starred on the Syfy program Warehouse 13 as Brother Adrian in the third and fourth seasons.

In March 2024, Spiner reprised his role of the eternally downtrodden Bob Wheeler, in the 11th episode of the second season of Night Court.

In 2026, Spiner, with his Star Trek: The Next Generation cast-mate Jonathan Frakes, started a podcast, Dropping Names with Brent and Jonny.

== Book ==
In October 2021, Spiner released Fan Fiction: A Mem-Noir: Inspired by True Events, a mixture of memoir (taking place during the filming of the fourth season of Star Trek: The Next Generation) and a fictitious noir detective story about Spiner dealing with a crazed, murderous fan who claims to be the fictitious Lal, the android daughter of Data in the third-season TNG episode "The Offspring". The audiobook version, primarily narrated by Spiner, featured vocal cameos from Spiner's TNG co-stars Patrick Stewart, Jonathan Frakes, Michael Dorn, LeVar Burton, Marina Sirtis, and Gates McFadden.

== Filmography ==
=== Film ===
| Year | Title | Role | Notes |
|---|---|---|---|
| 1970 | My Sweet Charlie | Local | Uncredited |
| 1980 | Stardust Memories | Fan in lobby | |
| 1981 | Rent Control | Leonard Junger | |
| 1982 | Ladies and Gentlemen, The Fabulous Stains | Corinne Burns's Boss | Uncredited |
| 1982 | Grease 2 | Student | Uncredited |
| 1985 | Crime of Innocence | Hinnerman | |
| 1986 | Sunday in the Park with George | Franz/Dennis | |
| 1986 | Sylvan in Paradise | Clinton C. Waddle | |
| 1986 | Manhunt for Claude Dallas | Jim Stevens | |
| 1987 | Family Sins | Ken McMahon | |
| 1989 | Miss Firecracker | Preacher Mann | |
| 1994 | Corrina, Corrina | Brent Witherspoon | |
| 1994 | Star Trek Generations | Lt. Commander Data | |
| 1995 | Kingfish: A Story of Huey Long | —N/a | Uncredited |
| 1995 | Pie in the Sky | Upscale Guy | |
| 1996 | Phenomenon | Dr. Bob Niedorf | |
| 1996 | Independence Day | Dr. Brackish Okun | Nominated—Saturn Award for Best Supporting Actor |
| 1996 | Star Trek: First Contact | Lt. Commander Data | Saturn Award for Best Supporting Actor |
| 1997 | Out to Sea | Gil Godwyn | |
| 1998 | Star Trek Insurrection | Lt. Commander Data | |
| 1999 | South Park: Bigger, Longer & Uncut | Conan O'Brien | Voice cameo |
| 2000 | Dude, Where's My Car? | Pierre | Uncredited |
| 2001 | I Am Sam | Shoe Salesman | |
| 2002 | The Master of Disguise | Devlin Bowman | |
| 2002 | Star Trek: Nemesis | Lt. Commander Data/B-4 | |
| 2004 | The Aviator | Robert Gross | |
| 2006 | Material Girls | Tommy Katzenbach | |
| 2008 | Superhero Movie | Dr. Strom | |
| 2010 | Quantum Quest: A Cassini Space Odyssey | Coach Mackey | Voice |
| 2016 | The Midnight Man | Ezekiel | |
| 2016 | Independence Day: Resurgence | Dr. Brackish Okun | |

=== Television ===
| Year | Title | Role | Notes |
|---|---|---|---|
| 1968 | The Pied Piper of Astroworld | Dr. Osgood T. Featherflowers | TV special |
| 1972 | To Tell the Truth | Himself/Imposter | 1 episode |
| 1978 | The Dain Curse | Tom Fink | Unknown episodes |
| 1979 | Family | Fred | Episode: "Prelude" |
| 1981 | Ryan's Hope | Kim's Doctor | Episode: "#1.1442" |
| 1984 | The Paper Chase | Student in Reeve's Class | Episode: "The Advocates" |
| 1984 | Tales from the Darkside | Reverend Peabody | Episode: "A Case of the Stubborns" |
| 1984 | One Life to Live | Ralph Harley | Episode: "17 December 1984" |
| 1985 | Robert Kennedy and His Times | Allard Lowenstein | Unknown episodes |
| 1985 | Hill Street Blues | Larry Stein | Episode: "The Life and Time of Domonic Florio Jr" |
| 1985–1987 | Night Court | Bob Wheeler | 6 episodes |
| 1986 | The Twilight Zone | The Draft Dodger | Episode: "The Leprechaun-Artist/Dead Run" |
| 1986 | American Playhouse | Dennis / Franz | Episode: "Sunday in the Park with George" |
| 1986 | Hunter | Willie Vaughn | Episode: "The Contract" |
| 1986–1987 | Mama's Family | Billy Bob Conroy | 2 episodes |
| 1987 | Cheers | Bill Grand | Episode: "Never Love a Goalie (Part 2)" |
| 1987 | Sledge Hammer! | Soldier | Episode: "The Spa Who Loved Me" |
| 1987–1994 | Star Trek: The Next Generation | Lt. Commander Data (series regular); Lore (4 episodes); Dr. Noonien Soong (3 episodes) | 177 episodes Nominated—Viewers for Quality Television Award for Best Supporting Actor in a Quality Drama Series |
| 1988 | Reading Rainbow | Himself | Episode: "The Bionic Bunny Show" |
| 1989 | What's Alan Watching? | Brentwood Carter | Pilot |
| 1991 | Crazy from the Heart | —N/a | Television film; uncredited |
| 1995 | Mad About You | Bob, The Dog Agent | Episode: "Just My Dog" |
| 1995 | Deadly Games | Danny Schlecht | Episode: "The Practical Joker" |
| 1995–1996 | Gargoyles | Puck (voice) | 4 episodes |
| 1996 | Dream On | Dr. Strongwater | Episode: "The Spirit of 76th & Park" |
| 1996 | The Outer Limits | Professor Trent Davis | Episode: "The Deprogrammers" |
| 1999 | Introducing Dorothy Dandridge | Earl Mills | Television film Nominated—Satellite Award for Best Actor – Miniseries or Television Film |
| 2000 | Geppetto | Stromboli | Television film |
| 2001 | A Girl Thing | Bob | Television film |
| 2001 | The Ponder Heart | Dorris Grabney | Television film |
| 2003 | Frasier | Albert | Episode: "Lilith Needs a Favor" |
| 2003 | An Unexpected Love | Brad | Television film |
| 2004 | Jack | Vernon | Television film |
| 2004 | Friends | James Campbell | Episode: "The One with Princess Consuela" |
| 2004 | Law & Order: Criminal Intent | Graham Barnes | Episode: "Shrink-Wrapped" |
| 2004–2005 | Star Trek: Enterprise | Dr. Arik Soong / Lt. Commander Data (voice) | 4 episodes |
| 2005 | Joey | Himself | Episode: "Joey and the Premier" |
| 2005–2006 | Threshold | Dr. Nigel Fenway | 13 episodes |
| 2009 | Leverage | William Quint | Episode: "The Juror #6 Job" |
| 2009 | Family Guy | Himself (voice) | Episode: "Not All Dogs Go to Heaven" |
| 2010–2013 | Generator Rex | Dr. Gabriel Rylander (voice) | 4 episodes |
| 2011 | The Guild | Himself | Episode: "Ends and Begins" |
| 2011 | Alphas | Dr. Kern | Episode: "Blind Spot" |
| 2011 | The Big Bang Theory | Himself | Episode: "The Russian Rocket Reaction" |
| 2011, 2021 | Young Justice | The Joker (voice) | 2 episodes |
| 2011 | Fresh Hell | Brent Spiner | 15 episodes |
| 2012 | The Simpsons | Robots (voice) | Episode: "Them, Robot" |
| 2012 | The Avengers: Earth's Mightiest Heroes | Purple Man (voice) | Episode: "Emperor Stark" |
| 2012 | Warehouse 13 | Brother Adrian | 6 episodes |
| 2013 | Robot Chicken | Dr. Noonien Soong, Gondola Jack, Medic (voice) | Episode: "Caffeine-Induced Aneurysm" |
| 2013 | Wendell & Vinnie | Himself | Episode: "Swindle & Vinnie" |
| 2014 | Ray Donovan | Therapist | 3 episodes |
| 2014 | Star Wars Rebels | Gall Trayvis (voice) | 2 episodes |
| 2014 | Hulk and the Agents of S.M.A.S.H. | Silver Surfer (voice) | Episode: "Fear Itself" |
| 2015 | Comedy Bang! Bang! | The Sandman | Episode: "Zach Galifianakis Wears Grey Corduroys and Brown Leather Shoes" |
| 2015–2016 | Blunt Talk | Phil | 4 episodes |
| 2016–2018 | Outcast | Sidney | 17 episodes |
| 2016 | The Blacklist | The Architect | Episode: "The Architect" |
| 2017 | Justice League Action | Edward Nygma / The Riddler (voice) | Episode: "E. Nigma, Consulting Detective" |
| 2019 | The Goldbergs | Dr. Emry | Episode: "This is This is Spinal Tap" |
| 2020–2023 | Star Trek: Picard | Data, Lore, Altan Soong, Adam Soong, Daystrom Android M-5-10 | Series regular 14 episodes |
| 2020 | The Ready Room | Himself | Episode: "Episode 20" |
| 2020 | Penny Dreadful: City of Angels | Ned Vanderhoff | 6 episodes |
| 2024 | Night Court | Bob Wheeler | Episode: "Wheelers of Fortune" |
| 2024 | Star Trek: Lower Decks | Purple Data | Episode: "Fully Dilated" |

=== Theater ===
| Year | Title | Role | Notes |
|---|---|---|---|
| 1978 | A History of the American Film | Hank | |
| 1983 | Sunday in the Park with George | Franz/Jed | |
| 1984–1985 | Sunday in the Park with George | Franz/Dennis | |
| 1984 | The Three Musketeers | Aramis | |
| 1985–1987 | Big River | The Duke | |
| 1992, 1993 | Every Good Boy Deserves Favour | Ivanov | |
| 1997–1998 | 1776 | John Adams | Nominated—Drama Desk Award for Outstanding Actor in a Musical |
| 2003 | Life × 3 | Hubert | |
| 2009 | Man of La Mancha | Cervantes | |

=== Video games ===
| Year | Title | Role | Notes |
|---|---|---|---|
| 1995 | Chronomaster | Milo | |
| 1995 | Star Trek: The Next Generation – A Final Unity | Data | |
| 1999 | Star Trek: Hidden Evil | Data | |
| 2002 | Star Trek: Bridge Commander | Data | |

=== Audiobooks ===
| Year | Title | Role | Notes |
|---|---|---|---|
| 2015 | Rain of the Ghosts | Setebos, Ducky Simpson | |
| 2021 | Fan Fiction: A Mem-Noir: Inspired by True Events | Brent Spiner, Various | |

== Discography ==
| Year | Title | Artist | Notes |
|---|---|---|---|
| 1991 | Ol' Yellow Eyes Is Back | Himself | |
| 2010 | Dreamland | Brent Spiner and Maude Maggart | |

== Awards and honors ==
- 2024 – Saturn Awards – Lifetime Achievement Award – The Cast of Star Trek: The Next Generation (Note: "The Lifetime Achievement Award is usually presented to an individual for their contributions to genre entertainment. Top luminaries like Stan Lee and Leonard Nimoy (Mr. Spock), have received this top honor. It's not new, but we extended this award to cover the entire cast of Star Trek: The Next Generation, due to its continued influence on the face of general television. It was originally doomed to failure since it was following in the footsteps of the original Star Trek, yet it carved its own identity, and its diverse cast was light years ahead of its time!" —Academy of Science Fiction, Fantasy and Horror Films)
