= Canard =

Canard (meaning "duck" in French) may refer to:

== Aviation ==
- Canard (aeronautics), a small wing in front of an aircraft's main wing
- Aviafiber Canard 2FL, a single seat recreational aircraft of canard design
- Voisin Canard, aircraft developed by the Voisin brothers

== People ==
- Marius Canard (1888–1982), French Orientalist and historian
- Nicolas-François Canard (c. 1750 – 1833), French mathematician and economist

== Places in Canada ==
- Canard, Nova Scotia, a group of hamlets and villages
- Canard River, a river in Nova Scotia

== Other uses ==
- Canard Pars, fictional character from the Japanese science fiction manga series Mobile Suit Gundam SEED Astray
- Canard PC, a French magazine devoted to computer gaming
- Canard, an alternative name for a diving plane, small wings attached to the front of a submarine or an automobile

== See also ==
- Antisemitic canard
- Kenard, a character in the television series The Wire
