= Csanád (disambiguation) =

Csanád was an 11th-century Hungarian nobleman.

Csanád may also refer to:

- Csanád County, a county in the Kingdom of Hungary
- Cenad (Hungarian: Csanád), a rural municipality in Timiș County, Banat, western Romania
- Roman Catholic Diocese of Szeged–Csanád, a Roman Catholic bishopric in Hungary
