= Rent Control (1984 film) =

- Directed by: Gian Luigi Polidoro
- Written by: John Menegold; Sherill Tippins
- Starring: Brent Spiner; Elizabeth Stack; Roy Brocksmith
- Release date: 1984
- Running time: 95 minutes
- Country: United States
- Languages: English; Italian

Rent Control is a comedy-drama/romance film starring Brent Spiner and directed by Gian Luigi Polidoro. The film was made in 1982 but was not released until 1984.

== Plot ==
Leonard Junger tries to find a rent-controlled New York City apartment, and to interest various women.

== Cast ==
- Brent Spiner as Leonard Junger
- Elizabeth Stack as Anne
- Roy Brocksmith as Stan
- Jeanne Ruskin as Margaret
- Leonard Melfi as Milton Goeller
- Annie Korzen as Nancy Junger
- Charles Laiken as Jim
- Kimberly Stern as Jeannie
- Leslie Cifarelli as Barbara
