= Marina Sargenti =

American director, writer, and producer (born 1947)

- Born: Marina Rae Sargenti; July 21, 1947 (age 78); Los Angeles, California, U.S.
- Occupations: Director, writer, producer
- Years active: 1989–2004

Marina Rae Sargenti (born July 21, 1947) is an American director, writer, and producer. Sargenti's first film was the 1990 horror film Mirror, Mirror, which she co-wrote. She later directed several episodes of Models Inc. (1994–95), Malibu Shores (1996), and the television film Lying Eyes (1996).

== Filmography ==
Year	Title	Credit	Notes
1990	Mirror, Mirror	Director, writer	
1991	Child of Darkness, Child of Light	Director	Television film
1994–95	Models Inc.	Director	3 episodes
1996	Malibu Shores	Director	1 episode
1996	Lying Eyes	Director	Television film
1997	Xena: Warrior Princess	Director	1 episode
