= Colored People's Time (TV show) =

American television program

Colored People's Time (CPT) was an American Black Public Affairs Television program that emerged in October 1968 as a response for broadcasters to serve the public interest and public identity, an identity which included the large African American population. Airing on Detroit's public broadcasting station WTVS, Colored People's Time was produced by Gil Maddox and Tony Brown who created the program to fill the lack of representation of the Black community as detailed by the Kerner Commission Report set in place by President Lyndon B. Johnson. The Kerner Commission Report attributed the social insurrections in places such as Detroit and Newark primarily to racism, which was particularly reinforced through the media. As a direct result, broadcasters were then required to increase the accessibility and opportunity of media content which reflected the African American experiences and lifestyle.

== Origin ==
Racial tensions rose to reach their peak in the summer of 1967, as the number and size of riots in the United States escalated dramatically. The turmoil was only made worst by the assassination of Martin Luther King Jr., only six months after the largest of the riots in Detroit and Newark. The National Advisory Commission on Civil Disorders, more commonly referred to as the Kerner Commission, sought to understand the causes of this unrest and proposed new guidelines and regulations in order to ease this tension. One of their major findings was that broadcast television failed to properly communicate these racial issues in the media which led to greater unrest, especially within large black populations, such as Detroit. Media surrounding the riots was severely biased by the white broadcast stations, and further served as a racial divide between the white television news reports and the antagonistic portrayal of African Americans. The government sought to remedy the solution by mandating quality representation of the African American community on broadcast television.

== Content ==
Hosted by Tony Brown, Colored People's Time, provided the large African American community with entertainment, interviews, round-table discussions, fashion and culture, and live performances. In an age where it was rare to see a single black face on television, Colored People's Time provided content that was produced, written, and performed by black talent and focused more on providing quality black entertainment than merely satisfying requirements for black on-screen representation.

== Historical relevance ==
Prior to the late 1960s the black audience was largely ignored and assumed to be complacent in their consumption of white broadcast media. Although deemed a minority, the African American population made up a large percentage of the viewers of broadcast television and yet, they were completely ignored by the rating systems and advertisers. However this all changed with the introduction of black public affairs television, demonstrating measurable proof that the African American community desired content that appealed to their local culture and addressed their needs. With the emergence of programming such as Colored People's Time, black audiences were provided a space to express their art, community, and beliefs and foster a sense of identity through television in a manner that had previously not been possible.

Colored People's Time served as a public forum through which the racial and social issues of the nation could be analyzed, discussed, and conveyed through the perspective of the African American community, specifically the community located in Detroit which had the third largest black population in America. It was through programming like Colored People's Time that history could be viewed from the black perspective, providing a radically different take than that of white mainstream media. Color People's Time was one of the first broadcast television programs to highlight relevant social issues pertaining to both racism and the black community through the use of on-location footage, scripted performances, and discussion based forums. Tony Brown's mission for the show was to foster a sense of community and encourage involvement from the large urban black population of Detroit. The Colored People's Time program was the first of several black public affairs television programming to inspire policy change to protect the media interests of the black population.

Due to positive responses from African American population regarding black public affairs television, in 1971, the Federal Communications Commission (FCC) sought to further ensure that broadcast media was identifying and conveying local issues which were reflected in their community. The FCC added a new requirement in which broadcasters must be actively addressing the needs of the community in order to renew their licenses as laid out in the Primer of Ascertainment of Community Problems by Broadcast Applicants. This new requirement ensured that future programming would serve the audience of the station by accurately reflecting their needs and community values. In additions to the efforts of the Kerner Commission and the Ascertainment of Community Needs, the FCC sought to enforce the Fairness Doctrine upon stations in order to improve the points of views presented in the news and allow for the marginalized voice of the black community to be heard.

=== Today ===
Due to the program's cultural relevance, it has been able to stay on the air, evolving in both format and content. Colored People's Time has undergone two name changes in its lifetime, the first a few years after its debut in 1968, changing its name to Detroit Black Journal to reflect the immediate community it was addressing. The program underwent another name change to the American Black Journal which has remained, celebrating its fiftieth birthday in 2018.

== Black public affairs television ==
Colored People's Time helped to shape both conversations and ideas regarding black public affairs. The program was able to provide relevant commentary on social issues occurring at the time, one of which was its commentary on the Black Panther Party. Colored People's Time questioned the way in which the image of the Black Panther Party was being portrayed in the media, questioning depictions of race, power, and societal constructions. Additionally, since Colored People's Time attracted both white and black audiences, the program was able to provide black perspectives on events ranging from the Federal Bureau of Investigation's inspection of black political organizations to the Watts Riots, appealing to audiences and allowing them to gain their voice and speak up against the racial injustice they were experiencing.

Additionally black public affair television programs valued live music, especially from black musicians. One of the most notable examples of this programming to address the black audiences was in 1968 directly after the assassination of Martin Luther King Jr. when the live broadcast of a James Brown concert on Boston station WGBH was used in order to calm the African American community and avoid mass hysteria and rioting. Other programs like Colored People's Time incorporated more live performances and highlighted the diversity of jazz musicians like Anita Baker and rhythm and blues group The Spinners.

== Featured episodes and public service announcements ==
A few of the episodes of Colored People's Time were archived and provided by Detroit Public Television's American Black Journal website for reference and consumption.

Archived Episodes of Colored People's Time (CPT)
Episode Title	Date	Host	Guest
Colored People's Time 3	1968	Tony Brown	Bill Murphy, Earl Grant, George Kirby, and Ray Jenkins
Colored People's Time: 1967 Detroit Riot	1968	Tony Brown, Sandy Lawrence, and Abe Ulmer	Bill Murphy, Kim Weston, Hal McKinney, Gwen McKinney, and George Kirby
Colored People's Time 2: "Free Your Mind" Public Service Announcement ("Two Selves")	October 23, 1968	Tony Brown	None
Colored People's Time 5: "The Making of a Rioter"	October 23, 1968	Tony Brown	None
Colored People's Time: Christmas Special Part 2	October 23, 1968	Tony Brown	Hal McKinney and Dick Gregory
Colored People's Time 2	October 23, 1968	Tony Brown, Sandy Lawrence, and Reginald Wilson	Stokely Carmichael, John Conyers, Wild Bill Davis, Harry Edwards, Inkster Community Choir, CLR James, John Lewis, Kent Martin, Hal McKinney, Martha Jean Steinberg, Rosalyn Russell, The Brothers of Soul, Lorenzo Wright, and William Watson
Colored People's Time: Episode 3	October 30, 1968	Tony Brown, Sandy Lawrence, and Abe Ulmer	Hal McKinney, Gwen McKinney, Bill Murphy, Earl Grant, George Kirby, Horace Bradfield, and Robert Tindal
Colored People's Time 5: "Free Your Mind" Public Service Announcement (Skin Lightening Cream)	November 14, 1968	Tony Brown	None
Colored People's Time 5	November 14, 1968	Tony Brown	International Gospel Choir, Black Students Association, Arthur Ashe Jr., George Kirby, Bill Murphy, Gwen McKinney, Kim Weston, Marcus Belgrave, Thomas Bowles, Diane Carol, and Hal McKinney
Colored People's Time: Episode 7 Part 2	November 27, 1968	Tony Brown, Sandy Lawrence, Abe Ulmer	None
Colored People's Time 13	January 22, 1969	Tony Brown, Sandy Lawrence, Abe Ulmer	The Contemporary Jazz Quintet, Eugene Eda, William Walker, The CPT Players, Kent Martin, Carmen Murphy, James Catchings, and Joanne Robinson

=== Related black public affairs programing ===
Colored People's Time was not the sole champion for black public affairs television programming. Several public affairs programs across the United States began to appear in the 1960s, some of which are still airing today.

Related programs:

- Tell It Like It Is (WABC, 1968–2011)
- Harambee (WTOP, 1968–1975)
- Say Brother (later renamed to Basic Black) (WGBH, 1968–present)
- Walk In My Shoes (ABC Close-Up, 1961)
- Soul! (WNDT/WNET, 1967–1973)
- Inside Bedford-Stuyvesant (WNEW, 1968–1971)
- Tony Brown's Journal (PBS, 1978–present)
