= Black public affairs television =

Genre of American television

Black public affairs television was a genre of American television program. It began in the late 1960s, after the underrepresentation of Black people in media. These programs focused on issues for the Black community, while also sharing local news and Black culture.

Black public affairs television originated out of New York City, and was mainly airing there. These television programs appreciated and showed off Black musicians with live music on their shows. This was a space where Black spectators could see their community and themselves represented in a positive way on television.

== History ==
During the civil rights movement, the fight for social justice resulted in riots and protests. In result of these riots, President Lyndon Johnson established the National Advisory Commission on Civil Disorders, (also known as the Kerner Commission). The main goal of this commission was to find the motive behind the riots and how to reduce the number of riots in the future. These riots were mainly covered by white journalists and were misrepresented in the media. The Kerner Commission declared that these violent riots weren't from young Black men, but were fueled by white racism. The Kerner Commission also called for more diversification on TV, because of how separate and unequal the representation was. Because of this, the commission came to the conclusion that there needed to be more Black journalists covering these issues. The commission furthered this extension to have more Black representation in the media. Following the assassination of Martin Luther King Jr. and the conclusions made by the commission, TV stations across the nation started to hire more Black journalists and reporters. After getting their foot in the door, Black journalists advocated for editorial control, increased funding, and better broadcasting times. In 1968 ABC used "blackness" as a strategy to compete with NBC and CBS, to appeal more to younger audiences. This fight for equality marked a turning point for the representation of Black Americans in the media.

== Notable programs ==
Black Journal covered the civil rights movement and black power movement, along with covering Black news, arts and editorial commentary. This program ran from 1968 until 2008. It changed its name to Tony Brown's Journal in 1978 when Tony Brown began to host the show in New York. This program had a much larger budget than other Black Public Affairs programs; Black Journal had the opportunity to cover Black communities in Atlanta, Detroit, Los Angeles, and New Orleans. This TV series was awarded an Emmy, a Peabody, and a Russwurm award, because of its coverage of Black movements and events over the years.

Colored People's Time was a program that covered events and topics that were important to Detroit's Black community. Colored People's Time ran from 1968 to present day, but after the first few years changed its name to Detroit Black Journal, and another name change to American Black Journal. This program consisted of entertainment, interviews, round-table discussions, fashion, culture, and live performances. It covered local and national news that relates to Detroits Black communities. Black producers, writers, and performers all worked together to create this program. Specifically the producers, Gil Maddox and Tony Brown, aimed to provide the nation with quality Black entertainment.

Inside Bed-Stuy was New York City's first African American community program and ran from 1968 to 1970 for 52 episodes. This program talked about African American social and cultural center of Bedford-Stuyvesant, a neighborhood in Brooklyn. It was written, produced and presented by Blacks. It shed light on ignored Black neighborhoods and Black America. They would film around the neighborhood, often outside, with musicians, famous guest, and thousands of guests from the community. This program talked about issues in the neighborhood, political topics that effect the Black community, but also had live music and readings of Black poems.

Say Brother is Great Blue Hill's (GBH) longest-running public affairs TV program, running from 1968 to present day, but changing its name to Basic Black in 1998 and then again to Rooted in 2025. This show had locally and nationally known guests consisting of Black artists, athletes, performers, politicians, professionals and writers. The purpose of the show was to share concerns and the culture of Black Americans with short documentaries, performances, and conversations.

Soul! was a program that ran from 1968 until 1973. Soul! was a performance-based variety show, which presented Black music, dance, and literature. Ellis Haizlip created a black arts showcase featuring artists like Stevie Wonder, Patti LaBelle, and Curtis Mayfield. It was a platform that Black pride and strength could be expressed and celebrated. The show also touched on Black politics and Black organizations like the Student Nonviolent Coordinating Committee.
