= Alan Curtis (author) =

American author (born 1943)

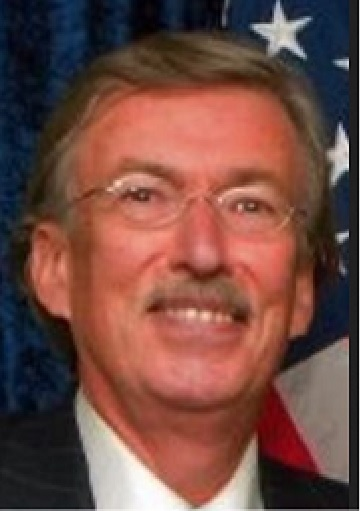
- Born: Lynn Alan Curtis; 1943 (age 82–83); Milwaukee, Wisconsin
- Education: Pulaski High School; Harvard University, B.A.; University of London, MS Economics; University of Pennsylvania, Ph.D. Urban Studies and Criminology
- Occupations: Advisor, author, social scientist, speaker
- Known for: Founding president and CEO of Milton S. Eisenhower Foundation
- Spouse: Ying Wang (m. 1995)
- Children: Miranda Curtis

Lynn Alan Curtis (born 1943) is an American social scientist, public policy advisor, author and speaker who is the founding president and CEO of the Milton S. Eisenhower Foundation. The foundation was founded In 1981 the private sector continuation of the National Advisory Commission on Civil Disorders and the National Commission on the Causes and Prevention of Violence.

== Early life and education ==
Curtis graduated from Pulaski High School in Milwaukee, then attended Harvard University, where he received a bachelor's degree. Curtis went to the University of London for a Masters of Economics, and later received a Ph.D. in Criminology and Urban Policy from the University of Pennsylvania.

== Career ==
While completing his Ph.D., Curtis was appointed as an assistant Crimes of Violence task force director on President Lyndon B. Johnson's National Commission on the Causes and Prevention of Violence. During the Administration of President Jimmy Carter, Curtis was executive director of the President's Urban and Regional Policy Group, urban policy advisor to the Secretary of Housing and Urban Development, and director of the Urban Initiatives Anti-Crime Program in public housing. After leaving public office in 1981, Curtis was named founding president and CEO of the Eisenhower Foundation which identifies, funds, evaluates and builds evidence-based programs for disadvantaged American youth and families.

During the 1990s, Curtis worked to bring American police chiefs to Japan to observe Japanese system of police neighborhood mini stations. He has also helped with the development and creation of the organization's Youth Safe Haven model.

Curtis has also developed the Eisenhower Foundation Quantum Opportunities Program model adapted from an earlier Quantum Opportunities Program. The program is aimed at high school students and offers tutoring, mentoring, life skills training and modest financial support. It is designed to generate positive educational outcomes and decrease delinquent behavior including drug and substance abuse, gang activity and teen pregnancy. Participants in the evaluation of the program showed significantly higher grades, graduation rates, college admission rates and college retention rates than individuals in the control group.

Curtis has authored or coauthored 25, 30, 40, and 50-year updates of the Kerner Commission and 15 and 30-year updates of the National Violence Commission. The 50 year update of the Kerner commission is titled Healing Our Divided Society and proposes evidence-based policies on employment, education, housing, neighborhood development and criminal justice.

== Selected bibliography ==
- Criminal Violence: National Patterns and Behaviors. Lexington, VA: D.C. Health and Company: Lexington Books. 1974. ISBN 0669960241.
- Violence, Race and Culture. Lexington, VA: D.C. Health and Company: Lexington Books. 1975. ISBN 0669960322.
- American Violence and Public Policy: An Update of the National Commission on the Causes and Prevention of Violence. New Haven, CT: Yale University Press. 1985.
- Investing in Children and Youth, Reconstructing Our Cities: A Twenty Five Year Update of the National Advisory Commission on Civil Disorders. Washington, DC: The Eisenhower Foundation. 1993.
- The Millennium Breach: Richer Poorer and Racially Apart. Washington, DC: The Eisenhower Foundation. 1998.
- Locked in The Poorhouse: Cities, Race and Poverty in the United States. Lanham, MD: Rowman and Littlefield Publishers. 1998. ISBN 0742509044.
- Patriotism, Democracy and Common Sense: Restoring America's Promise At Home and Abroad. Rowman and Littlefield Publisher. 2004. ISBN 0742542173.
- Healing Our Divided Society. Philadelphia, PA: Temple University Press. 2018. ISBN 978-1439916032.
