= Alan Curtis =

Alan Curtis may refer to:

- Alan Curtis (American actor) (1909–1953), American film actor
- Alan Curtis (author) (born 1943), American social scientist, public policy advisor and author
- Alan Curtis (British actor) (1930–2021), English actor and cricket announcer
- Alan Curtis (footballer) (born 1954), former Welsh international footballer
- Alan Curtis (harpsichordist) (1934–2015), American harpsichordist, musicologist, and conductor

== See also ==
- Alan B. Curtiss (active since 1978), assistant director and producer of American films
- Allen Curtis (1877–1961), American film director
- Allen Hiram Curtiss (1845–1907), botanist in the United States
