= Locked in the Poorhouse =

1998 followup by Eisenhower Foundation to 1968 Kerner Commission Report

Locked in the Poorhouse: Cities, Race, and Poverty in the United States is a 30-year update of the final report of the National Advisory Commission on Civil Disorders (the Kerner Commission), co-authored by former Kerner Commissioner, Senator and Milton S. Eisenhower Foundation Chairman Fred R. Harris and Eisenhower Foundation President Alan Curtis. The book was released in 1998 with a companion volume, The Millennium Breach.

== Background ==
The Kerner Commission was established by President Lyndon B. Johnson in 1967 after the 1960s protests in Los Angeles, Chicago, Detroit, Newark and many other cities.

The Kerner Commission's final report was released on February 29, 1968, after seven months of investigation. The report became an instant best-seller, and over two million Americans bought copies of the 426-page document. Its finding was that the riots resulted from black frustration at lack of economic opportunity. Dr. Martin Luther King Jr. pronounced the report a “physician’s warning of approaching death, with a prescription for life.”

The final report's most famous passage warned, “Our nation is moving toward two societies, one black, one white – separate and unequal.”

The Commission concluded that a significant cause of urban violence was white racism and suggested that white America bore much of the responsibility for African American protests. The final report recommended expanded employment and education opportunity, more diverse and sensitive police forces, and substantial investments in new housing aimed at breaking up residential segregation. New initiatives needed to be “at a scale equal to the dimensions of the problems.” The Commission cautioned that only with “new will” in the nation could its recommendations be implemented.

== Continuation of the Commission ==
The Milton S. Eisenhower Foundation (the Eisenhower Foundation) was formed in 1981 to continue the work of the Kerner Commission and of the 1968 National Commission on the Causes and Prevention of Violence (the National Violence Commission). Kerner Commission Executive Director Ginsburg, former Kerner Commissioner and Senator Fred Harris (D, OK) and former Kerner Commissioner and Senator Edward Brooke (R, MA) were among the Founding Trustees of the Eisenhower Foundation. The Foundation has released 25 year, 30 year and 40 year updates of the Kerner Commission's final report.

== The 30 Year Update: Locked in the Poorhouse and The Millennium Breach. ==
In Locked in the Poorhouse, one of the two companion volume 30 year updates, Harris observed, “During most of the decade that followed the Kerner Report, America made progress on the principal formats that the report dealt with: race, poverty and inner cities. Then progress stopped and, in some ways, went into reverse. What caused this halt and retreat? First a series of economic shocks and trends had a depressing impact, especially on minorities. And second, the government's action and inaction bore a good deal of the blame...Today, thirty years after the Kerner report, there is more poverty in America, it is deeper, blacker and browner than before and it is more concentrated in the cities, which have become America's poorhouses.

The companion volume to Locked in the Poorhouse, The Millennium Breach, was featured in a debate on the PBS NewsHour with Jim Lehrer. When reporter Elizabeth Farnsworth asked about the policy that was needed, Eisenhower Foundation President Alan Curtis replied, "What needs to be done is not talk about liberal versus conservative but what doesn't work versus what works. What doesn't work is prison building, supply-side economics, policies like that. They've failed. We need to stop doing what doesn't work and invest in what does work: safe havens after school where kids come for help with their homework, as evaluated by Columbia University; the James Comer Yale University School Development Plan, where teachers and parents take over inner city schools; the Ford Foundation's Quantum Opportunities program that mentors high schoolers; community development corporations like the New Community Corporation in Newark, which creates jobs; the South Shore Bank, which creates banking for the inner city; and community-based policing by minority officers. Those are all proven, scientifically-evaluated programs, and if we replicate what works at a scale that's equal to the dimensions of the problem, we can make an impact."

Locked in the Poorhouse and The Millennium Breach also received coverage in the Washington Post, Los Angeles Times, Newsweek and many regional newspapers – as well as on ABC, BBC, CNN and NPR.

== The Forty Year Update ==
What Together We Can Do, the Foundation's follow up 40 year update summary of the Kerner Commission, drew on Eisenhower Foundation hearings in Detroit and Newark, a Foundation forum on the media, and recommendations from a national advisory panel. The 40 year update viewed the 2008 election of the first African-American President as one of a number of indicators of post-Kerner program progress. But the update also reported that the child poverty rate and income inequality had increased since the 1968 Kerner report. With the failure of the No Child Left Behind Act, large disparities remained between the educational achievement of white high school students and Latino and African-American high school students. African-American unemployment continued to be roughly twice that of whites over the 40 years since the original Kerner report. The collaboration of the prison-industrial complex and racially-biased drug sentencing had dramatically increased incarceration rates, with African-American men aged 25 to 29 being almost 7 times as likely to be incarcerated as their white counterparts.

Accordingly, the 40th anniversary Eisenhower Foundation Kerner update recommended that:

• The nation's top strategic domestic priority should embrace win-win employment, economic, and education reforms that simultaneously benefit the anxious middle class, the neglected working class and the truly disadvantaged.

• Demand side, Keynesian economic policy should lower unemployment; communicate to the poor, working class, and middle class that they need to band together; strengthen union organizing and link job training to job creation.

• A new Employment Training and Job Creation Act should replace the outmoded and ineffective Workforce Investment Act and the Temporary Assistance to Needy Families program. Trained and retrained American workers should be linked, as first priority, to jobs in sectors that need to be developed in the national interest –like health care, housing, school repair and construction, mass transit, energy and green technologies.

• The failed No Child Left Behind Act should be replaced by an Education Equity Act. The federal government should begin to finance a system that creates equity in dollar investment per pupil across all school districts, as is done in most advanced industrialized countries. The Act should build on successful state equity models, like those in Connecticut and North Carolina.

• Safe Haven Investment Neighborhoods should be funded across the nation. The Investment Neighborhoods should include people in deepest poverty, other impoverished citizens and working-class families. Drawing in part on the models like the Harlem Children's Zone, Safe Haven Investment Neighborhoods should replicate best practices – programs already proven to work. In each Safe Haven Investment Neighborhood, multiple and interdependent solutions should target multiple problems.

• A new Safe Haven Investment Corporation should co-target federal with local public and private funding – channeling that funding in no small part to grassroots community-based 501(c)(3) nonprofit organizations with demonstrated institutional capacity located in each Safe Haven Investment Neighborhood.

• The tax breaks given to the wealthiest Americans in 2001 and 2003 should be reversed. This could save about $3.5 trillion over the next 10 years. Tax loopholes that give American one of the lowest effective corporate tax rates in the industrialized world should be eliminated. At the same time, we need to reduce taxes on the great majority of Americans.

• To create national will, a new Fair Economic Deal movement should articulate a narrative that unites the middle class, the working class and the poor as partners in the American story. The movement should be based on the values of two Republican Presidents and two Democratic Presidents – Abraham Lincoln, Theodore Roosevelt, Franklin Roosevelt and John Kennedy. Abraham Lincoln invested in public infrastructure and crusaded against racial injustice. Theodore Roosevelt called for regulation of corporate greed. Franklin Roosevelt created an American social contract. John Kennedy focused on “what together we can do” to serve our country.

The PBS Bill Moyers Journal covered the 40 year Kerner Commission update. Moyers sent crews to cover the pre-report Foundation hearings in Detroit and Newark. After an in-depth interview with Harris and coverage of the Detroit and Newark hearings, Moyers observed:

We remember the Kerner Report for its searing conclusion that "our nation is moving toward two societies, one black, one white – separate and unequal." African-Americans at the time were fast becoming concentrated and isolated in metropolitan ghettos, and the Kerner Commission said that by 1985, without new policies, our cities would have black majorities ringed with largely all-white suburbs.

The commissioners acknowledged that government policies like urban-gentrification, and the construction of huge high-rise projects had helped to blight stable black communities. So they offered some specific and practical remedies – new jobs, affordable housing, and new steps to confront the destructive ghetto environment. But following the civil rights movement of the mid-sixties – the peaceful marches and demonstrations, the Civil Rights Act of 1964, the Voting Rights Act of 1965– the riots triggered a mounting white backlash. LBJ's escalation of the war in Vietnam added fuel to the fires.

The Kerner Report was published on March 1, 1968. Hardly five weeks later – on the fourth of April, forty years ago next week – Martin Luther King was assassinated. Flames again engulfed dozens of cities, and the possibility of large-scale change perished in the blood and ashes and racist toxins. The president had told the Kerner Commission: "Let your search be free…as best you can, find the truth and express it in your report." They did. But the truth was not enough. The country lost the will for it.

The Eisenhower Foundation's 40 year Kerner Riot Commission update also was the focus of an op-ed in the Washington Post by former Senator Brooke. A Republican, Brooke reviewed progress, but cautioned that “for America’s poor – those who do not know what health care is because for them it doesn’t exist, those for whom prison is a more likely prospect than college, those who have been abandoned to the worst of decaying, crime-ridden urban centers because of the flight of middle-class blacks, whites and Hispanics – the future may be as bleak as it was for their counterparts in the 1960s.”

The 40 year update was extensively covered in other media, as well.

== Criticism ==
There were critics of the original Kerner Commission report, Locked in the Poorhouse and The Millennium Breach – and responses by the Eisenhower Foundation. For example, in a letter to the Wall Street Journal publication, Eisenhower Foundation Trustee Elliott Currie, Professor of Criminology, Law and Society at the University of California, Irvine, wrote:

Abigail and Stephan Thernstrom profess themselves mystified over the causes of urban violence analyzed – badly in their view – by the Kerner report of 1968 (“American Apartheid? Don’t Believe It.” Editorial Page, March 2). But their confusion requires an extraordinary level of denial, which can be maintained only by ignoring or misreading a body of evidence that was already substantial in the 1960s and is even larger today.

To begin with, the Thernstroms, curiously, ignore altogether the role of the police in fueling the tensions that led to the worst of riots, though the Kerner report found anger at police practices at the top of the list of black residents’ grievances in the riot-torn cities. As importantly, the Thernstroms seem not to understand – or perhaps not to have read – the report's analysis of the links between social disadvantage and the outbreak of violence.

They claim, for example, that black unemployment in Detroit, the city hardest hit by urban violence, was only 3.4 percent and hence the city could hardly be considered “a tinderbox ready to explode.” The authors of the Kerner report, however, knew better. They noted that the unemployment rate among black men in the 12th Street area, where the riot began, was estimated at 12 percent to 15 percent, and 30 percent or more for those under 25 – the population from which the typical riot participant came. More importantly, the Thernstroms are apparently unaware that the report cited Labor Department estimates that the proportion of inner-city blacks who were either out of work altogether (including those who had dropped out of the labor force), working part-time when they needed full-time work, or working at poverty-level wages, was many times higher than those officially jobless. They also noted that the most typical riot participant was drawn from the large populations of young men trapped in menial or low-paying jobs – and surrounded by an affluence they were largely blocked from attaining.

An abundance of statistics shows that those conditions are still very much with us. The riots of the 60s constituted a staggering human tragedy. That tragedy will be compounded if we lose sight of the lessons they so painfully taught us about the connections between inequality and violence.

Other critics argued in USA Today that, unlike the Kerner focus on blocked educational and economic opportunity and racism, the major problem among inner city African Americans was “single parent homes.” In response, Currie argued that the critics wrongly blamed the “heedless behavior of black men.” Currie pointed out that critics formerly had blamed the “welfare” system – but, by 2008, “welfare” had been ended for over 10 years. Returning to the findings of the Kerner Commission, Currie concluded that the real problems were:

• Jobless rates among black men that remained stratospheric even in times of economic growth;

• The retreat from an already minimal commitment to investment in job creation and training; and

• A stunning rise in incarceration of black men with no corresponding effort to reintegrate them on their release into productive roles in the community.
