= Black Journal (TV program) =

American public affairs TV program

- Genre: Documentary; Public affairs Educational
- Country of origin: United States
- Original language: English

Production
- Running time: 60 minutes / 30 minutes
- Production company: WNET

Original release
- Network: NET 1968-1970; PBS 1970-1977
- Release: June 12, 1968 – 1977

Black Journal is an American public affairs television program on National Educational Television (NET) and later WNET. It covered issues relevant to African-American communities with film crews sent to Atlanta, Detroit, New Orleans, and Los Angeles, and Ethiopia. The program was originally an hour-long broadcast each month. In 1971, the journalist Tony Brown took over leadership and later the series transitioned to commercial television under the name Tony Brown’s Journal. The series later returned to public television in 1982 under the new name. Other executive producers included documentary filmmakers Madeline Anderson, William Greaves and St. Clair Bourne.

The show aired until 2008. Black Journal offered a close look at the civil rights movement and Black Power movements of the 1960s and was influential in shaping Black opinion at the time. The show won Emmy, Peabody and Russwurm awards for its coverage of timely issues. WNET and the Library of Congress digitized episodes and contributed copies to the American Archive of Public Broadcasting between 2012 and 2018.

== Origins ==
Black Journal was publicly funded in response to the Kerner Commission (1967) with a goal of presenting Black urban life and Black issues in order to provide Black Americans with a representation in the media. The Kerner Commission cited inflammatory representation of riots and lack of presence in mass media as sources of Black American discontent. President Lyndon B. Johnson, concerned with the impact of the long, hot summer of 1967, hoped that programs like Black Journal would prevent future riots.

== Production ==
July 17, 1967 — Riots in Newark were sparked by the arrest and alleged abuse by police of a black cab driver. The riots continued for five days. National Educational Television (NET) immediately commissioned a documentary that would cover the uprisings and their causes. The production team rented a room in Newark's Robert Treat Hotel to use as a base for the production and the crew began filming.

After two days, Alvin Perlmutter, executive producer of the project, noted that just about every other television news organization was also working on the Newark streets, chronicling the same story. On the third day, Perlmutter suggested to NET's VP Bill Kobin that public television dig deeper and forego “coverage” in favor of providing black citizens in Newark — and nationally — with some responses to their complaints: that on TV and in the press blacks were usually the subjects only of breaking news, but not represented in other ways in the media. At the time, it was hard to find anything on the air that showed African Americans being born, growing up, marrying, working, contributing to their communities — or dying. Perlmutter proposed to Kobin a series of public television programs that would be for blacks, about blacks, and address their everyday issues from health to family and culture to politics — to be produced by black and white producers. It took Kobin less than a week to recast his budget to provide for four once-a-month hour-long productions that became “Black Journal.”

Perlmutter was named executive producer and instituted a magazine-style format with a black and white production staff made up NET personnel and freelancers. At the time, Perlmutter suggested that a black EP should be named after the first four programs. The on-air launch was very well received with excellent reviews. As the third program was being readied for air, black members of the staff understandably, given the tenor of the times, petitioned Perlmutter that a black EP be named sooner. There was no argument. He agreed and William Greaves took over the EP role. Perlmutter continued for the next couple of programs as a consultant.

Under Greaves’ direction, Black Journal won an Emmy Award in 1969 for excellence in public affairs programming. In 1971, the journalist Tony Brown took over leadership and in 1977 the series transitioned to commercial television under the name Tony Brown’s Journal after many PBS affiliate stations chose not to carry it, preferring instead to air less-controversial public affairs programs. The series returned to public television in 1982 under the new name.

Black Journal had many technical accomplishments. A special program to provide technical training to minorities allowed for apprenticeships for Black Journal crews shooting in the New York area and facilitated minorities into the television industry.

Episodes spanning 1968 to 1977 of Black Journal have been contributed to the American Archive of Public Broadcasting by WNET and the Library of Congress, and features segments on the Black Power Movement, the “black is beautiful” movement, the assassinations of Martin Luther King Jr. and Malcolm X, the African diaspora, the Black Panthers, Pan-Africanism, media's representation of black people and more.

== Featured guests ==
Episodes of Black Journal feature interviews with activist and author Angela Davis and basketball player Kareem Abdul-Jabbar, as well as episodes and segments about the black community in Compton, the role of the black artist, and the importance of education in newly independent Guyana. Subjects included education, employment, American history, incarceration, fashion, religion, racism, music, and dance.

Charles Hamilton, Columbia University political science professor and co-author of Black Power with Stokely Carmichael, was a frequent guest. He was presented as a genteel intellectual, and clips were shown of him lecturing in his classes. He also provided commentary on electoral politics. Kathleen Cleaver, Communications Secretary for the Black Panther Party at the time, was a frequent guest and often advocated for violence in the role of Black social justice. Historian Richard Moore was featured on the program as one of the few defenders of civil disobedience in the Black freedom struggle, but he was outnumbered by radicals on the panel.

== Featured topics ==
- Huey Newton's imprisonment
- School decentralization
- Two-part evaluation of the assassination of Martin Luther King Jr. (pt 1 and pt 2)
- The Poor People's Campaign
- CORE Convention (Summer 1968, Columbus, OH)
- The civil war in Biafra
- The liberation struggles in Mozambique and South Africa
- The growth of a Louisiana cooperative
- Police-community relations
- The assassination of Fred Hampton by police
- The assassination of Bobby Hutton by police
- Nationalist-Marxist debates
- The incarceration of Bobby Seale
- The exile of Eldridge Cleaver
- The election of President Richard Nixon
- Housing integration
- School busing
- Labor struggles from Mississippi to New York
- Interview with Minister and Nation of Islam leader Louis Farrakhan

== See also ==
- Acham, Christine. Revolution Televised: Prime Time and the Struggle for Black Power. Minneapolis: University of Minnesota Press, 2004. Print. ISBN 9780816644315
- "Brown, Tony." Encyclopedia of World Biography. Ed. Andrea Henderson. 2nd edn, Vol. 24. Detroit: Gale, 2005. 68–70. Gale Virtual Reference Library. June 2, 2016.
- Heitner, Devorah. Black Power TV. Durham: Duke University Press, 2013. Print. ISBN 9780822354093
