= The White Girl (1990 film) =

- Directed by: Tony Brown
- Written by: Tony Brown
- Produced by: Tony Brown
- Starring: Troy Beyer; Taimak
- Cinematography: Joseph M. Wilcots
- Edited by: Tony Vigna
- Music by: Jimmy Lee Brown; George Porter Martin
- Release date: 1990
- Country: United States
- Language: English

The White Girl is a 1990 American drama film written, produced and directed by Tony Brown and starring Troy Beyer and Taimak.

== Premise ==
A young African American college student, a judge's daughter, battles a cocaine addiction, or as the substance is known on the streets, the white girl.

== Production ==
Brown, who used $2 million of his own money to have The White Girl produced, also deferred some of his income from his production of his television shows as part of making it. Filming was scheduled to begin in September 1987. Duke University and North Carolina Central University were two of the filming locations.

African-Americans made up about 80% of the film crew. Caryn James of The New York Times stated that the use of black crew was "more significant and effective than anything [Brown] has put on screen."

== Rating ==
The Motion Picture Association of America gave the film an "R" rating, something Brown disapproved of and appealed, since he feared it would turn people off from seeing it. The rating later changed to PG-13. Mathews stated that "With the exception of one moderately strong slang word, The White Girl would seem to be as easily acceptable for general TV viewing."

== Reception ==
Roger Ebert ranked the film two stars, stating that it "is predictable and not especially profound, but it's interesting because it deals realistically with the kinds of pressures that might exist in such a situation". Jack Mathews of the Los Angeles Times described the film as "essentially a morality play about a middle-class black college girl who becomes vulnerable to drug addiction because of family pressures placed on her to succeed among whites." Caryn James of the New York Times concluded that "as a movie The White Girl is hopeless", and stated that it "is so sincere, blunt and awkward it resembles a 94-minute-long public service message about the dangers of drugs." Hal Hinson of the Washington Post stated that he was unable to take the film in a serious manner and that Brown "doesn't have the talent to convey" the "serious message" present in the film.
