= Troy Byer =

American actress

- Born: New York City, U.S.
- Other name: Troy Beyer
- Occupations: Psychologist, author, actress, director, screenwriter
- Years active: 1984–present
- Spouse: Mark Burg (1994–2000)

Troy Byer is an American psychologist, author, director, screenwriter and actress. For most of her acting career she was credited as Troy Beyer.

== Early life and education ==
Byer was born in New York City to an African-American mother and Jewish father.

== Career ==
After landing a bit part in Francis Ford Coppola's The Cotton Club (1984), Byer moved to Los Angeles, and became a regular on the ABC prime-time soap opera Dynasty in 1986, playing Jackie Deveraux, the daughter of Diahann Carroll's character Dominique Deveraux.

She then acted in features such as Disorderlies (1987), The Five Heartbeats (1991) as Baby Doll, Weekend at Bernie's II (1993), Eddie (1996), Robert Altman's The Gingerbread Man (1998), and John Q (2002).

In 1997, Byer made her screenwriting debut with B*A*P*S. In 1998, she made her directing debut with her screenplay Let's Talk About Sex (1998), which she also starred in. The film was picked up by Fine Line Features. In 2002, Byer wrote and directed Love Don't Cost a Thing, based on the 1987 movie Can't Buy Me Love.

== Filmography ==
=== Film ===
Year	Title	Role	Notes
1987	Uncle Tom's Cabin	Emmeline	TV movie
1987	Disorderlies	Carla	
1989	Rooftops	Elena	
1990	The White Girl	Kim	
1991	The Five Heartbeats	Baby Doll	
1993	Weekend at Bernie's II	Claudia	
1994	3 Chains o' Gold	-	Video
1996	The Little Death	Defense Attorney	
1996	Eddie	Beth Hastings	
1996	Alien Avengers	-	TV movie
1997	B.A.P.S.	Tracy Shaw	
1998	The Gingerbread Man	Konnie Dugan	
1998	Let's Talk About Sex	Jasmine "Jazz" Hampton	
2001	Good Advice	Nancy	
2001	Surviving Gilligan's Island	Diner	
2002	John Q.	Miriam Smith	
2002	A Light in the Darkness	Kira Hansen	
2002	Malevolent	Kelly	
2003	Recipe for Disaster	Welfare Officer	TV movie
2012	Mommy's Little Monster	Kira Hansen	
2015	Ex-Free	Tanya	

=== Television ===
Year	Title	Role	Notes
1969	Sesame Street	herself	Recurring: seasons 1–6
1985	Knots Landing	Whitney	Recurring cast: season 7
1986–87	Dynasty	Jackie Deveraux	Recurring cast: season 7
1987	21 Jump Street	Patty Blatcher	Episode: "The Worst Night of Your Life"
1987	A Different World	Monica Walters	Episode: "The Gift of the Magi"
1988	Sonny Spoon	Gwendolyn	Episode: "Semper Fi"
1989	A Man Called Hawk	Anna George	Episode: "Vendetta"
1991	The Cosby Show	Ellen	Episode: "No More Mr. Nice Guy"
1993	TriBeCa	Debra	Episode: "The Box"
1993	Walker, Texas Ranger	Catherine 'Cat' Prather	Episode: "End Run"
1994	Diagnosis: Murder	Brianna Jones	Episode: "Standing Eight Count"
1995	Red Shoe Diaries	Angel	Episode: "Billy Bar"
1996–97	Murder One	Carla Latrell	Recurring cast: season 2
