= Let's Talk About Sex (film) =

- Theatrical release poster
- Directed by: Troy Beyer
- Written by: Troy Beyer
- Produced by: Deborah Ridpath
- Starring: Troy Beyer; Paget Brewster; Randi Ingerman; Michaline Babich; Tina Nguyen
- Cinematography: Kelly Evans
- Edited by: William Henry; A. Michael Page
- Music by: Jon Carpenter
- Distributed by: Fine Line Features
- Release date: September 11, 1998
- Running time: 82 minutes
- Country: United States
- Language: English

Let's Talk About Sex is a 1998 American dramatic film written, directed by, and starring Troy Beyer. The film received generally negative reviews from critics.

== Plot ==
Jazz (Troy Beyer) works as a newspaper advice columnist located in Miami, Florida. The movie takes place over the span of a long weekend in which she interviews many women about sex, to edit into a pilot episode for a series titled Girl Talk.

== MPAA controversy ==
The film was originally rated NC-17 by the MPAA, but was edited for an R-rating. According to Beyer, among other items the MPAA would have required to give the film a lower rating, Beyer was asked to remove a scene where a fully dressed woman licks a peach in demonstration of cunnilingus. Beyer says that the scene was "heartfelt... It wasn't vulgar or demeaning to anyone." Regarding her experience with the MPAA, Beyer said, "I felt violated. I felt raped artistically."

The film has aired numerous times uncut on French television.

== Reception ==
Roger Ebert of RogerEbert.com gave the film a one-star negative review, criticising its portrayal of men. Stephen Holden of The New York Times called the film an "entertaining hodgepodge of quasi-documentary, soft-core porn, sex farce and psychobabbling soap opera", but criticised its lack of focus. Jonathan Rosenbaum of The Chicago Reader said the movie could be "phony" during big emotional scenes.
