= Victor Palmieri =

American lawyer and diplomat

- Born: Victor Henry Palmieri; February 16, 1930 (age 96); Chicago, Illinois, U.S.
- Education: Stanford University (AB, LLB)
- Occupations: lawyer; real estate financier; corporate turnaround specialist

Victor Henry Palmieri (born February 16, 1930) is an American lawyer, real estate financier and corporate turnaround specialist. He was also the Deputy Executive of the Kerner Commission and Ambassador-at-large and U.S. Coordinator for Refugee Affairs in the United States Department of State during the Jimmy Carter administration.

== Early life and education ==
Palmieri was born in Chicago, and earned his A.B. and LL.B. from Stanford University. He was admitted to the California Bar in 1954 and was based in Malibu, California.

== Career ==
In the mid-1960s, Palmieri was the president of the Janss Corporation, one of the largest real estate development firms in the western United States (this firm had developed the Snowmass ski resort). He quickly became known for his ability and skills to manage large and complicated ventures. In 1966, President Lyndon Johnson had considered appointing Palmieri to a position in HUD, but Palmieri was not interested. In August 1967, he was selected to be the Kerner Commission's second-in-charge staff position where he was responsible for overseeing many of the commission's daily activities, keeping its many investigative activities on-schedule, and writing and editing key parts of the commission's final report (including its summary which includes the report's powerful statement that the country is "moving toward two societies, one Black, one white--separate and unequal").

Following his work at the commission, Palmieri created The Palmieri Company, a general management consulting firm that specialized in large-scale reorganizations and restructurings.

Palmieri's participation in a convocation of business leaders and students at Harvard University during the Vietnam War landed him in the Nixon Enemies List.

Palmieri served as the Deputy Rehabilitator and CEO at Mutual Benefit from 1991 until 1994. From 1994 to 1995, He served as the president and CEO of MBL Life Assurance Corp.

Palmieri is the retired vice chairman and general counsel of MullinTBG, a leading executive benefits consulting firm located in Los Angeles, CA. He is currently a director of M Financial Holdings, Southern California Radio, and Chairman of Los Angeles Universal Preschool.

Palmieri has been a trustee of the Rockefeller Foundation and president of the Lincoln Center Theater. He was previously on the boards of directors of Phillips Petroleum, Arvida Corporation, Pennsylvania Company, Outlet Communications, the William Carter Company, and Broadcasting Partners.

Palmieri taught courses on corporate crisis management at Stanford Law School and at the John F. Kennedy School of Government at Harvard University.
