= Black Lies, White Lies =

1995 book by Tony Brown

- Author: Tony Brown
- Publisher: HarperCollins
- Publication date: November 21, 1995
- ISBN: 9780688132705

Black Lies, White Lies: The Truth According to Tony Brown is a 1995 book by Tony Brown, published by William Morrow & Company.

Brown advocates for black self-reliance. He criticizes black politicians' ties to the Democratic Party. He stated that African-Americans make up four "tribes". Richard Kahlenberg of The Washington Post stated that "conspiracy theories", including those targeting the National Institutes of Health (NIH) and saying that AIDS research funds are not distributed properly, make up about 33% of the content. Kahlenberg stated that the criticisms of affirmative action for wealthier minorities are "flashes of insight".

== Background ==
The book was dedicated to his foster guardians, Elizabeth "Mama" Sanford and Mabel Holmes, Sanford's daughter.

== Reception ==
Kahlenberg stated that Brown's "sensationalist style that works better on television than in print" undermines his "legitimate criticisms".

Publishers Weekly stated that Brown "undermines his case with a broad-brush assessment of the black community", referring to the designation of tribes, "and exaggerated references to black leaders' support for (and America's drift to) socialism".

== See also ==
- Black conservatism in the United States
