= Albert E. Jenner Jr. =

American attorney (1907–1988)

- Born: Albert Ernest Jenner Jr. June 20, 1907; Chicago, Illinois, U.S.
- Died: September 18, 1988 (aged 81); Deerfield, Illinois, U.S.
- Education: University of Illinois at Urbana-Champaign (BA, LLB)
- Occupation: Lawyer

Albert Ernest Jenner Jr. (June 20, 1907 – September 18, 1988) was an American lawyer and one of the name partners at the law firm of Jenner & Block. He served as assistant counsel to the Warren Commission; as a member of the U.S. National Commission on the Causes and Prevention of Violence; and as special counsel to the House Judiciary Committee during the Watergate Scandal and the impeachment process against Richard Nixon.

== Background ==
Jenner was born in Chicago, and his father was a police officer with the Chicago Police Department. Jenner attended the University of Illinois at Urbana–Champaign (B.A. 1929). To help pay his way through college, Jenner earned money by competing as a professional boxer. He was also the circulation editor at the Daily Illini. It was while working on the Daily Illini that Jenner met his future wife, Nadine Newbill.

He studied law at the University of Illinois College of Law, receiving his LL.B. in 1930. Following law school, he served as the reporter for the Illinois Civil Practice Act. He joined the firm of Poppenheusen, Johnston, Thompson and Cole (the precursor of Jenner & Block) in 1933 and became a partner of the firm in 1939. Jenner thrived at the firm and, in 1947, at age 40, he became the president of the Illinois State Bar Association. He would later serve as the eighth president of the American College of Trial Lawyers.

== Years as prominent attorney ==
In his practice at Poppenheusen, Johnston, Thompson and Cole, Jenner would develop relationships with several prominent clients. By the 1940s, Jenner had already become the top earner at the firm. In 1955, he was rewarded by becoming a named partner at the firm. (The firm eventually became known as "Jenner & Block" in 1964.) As a lawyer, Jenner was dedicated to pro bono work and, in the 1960s, he supported partner Prentice Marshall's efforts to found Jenner & Block's pro bono program, one of the first in the country. Jenner had a history of representing figures from Jack Rubenstein's (AKA Jack Ruby) criminal milieu, such as Allen Dorfman, an insurance agency owner, and consultant to the International Brotherhood of Teamsters (IBT) Central States Pension Fund who was a close associate of longtime IBT President Jimmy Hoffa, and associated with organized crime via the Chicago Outfit. Dorfman was convicted on several felony counts, and was murdered in 1983. Jenner was counsel for General Dynamics in 1963 when it was deeply involved in a series of scandals in Texas that were exposed by the U.S. Department of Justice.

In the early 1950s, President Harry S. Truman appointed Jenner to the Civil Service Commission Loyalty Review Board, which had been established by Executive Order 9835 in 1947.

In 1960, the Supreme Court of the United States appointed Jenner to the Advisory Committee for the Federal Rules of Civil Procedure, a post he would hold until 1970.

Following the assassination of John F. Kennedy, Jenner was named as assistant counsel to the Warren Commission. Along with Wesley J. Liebeler, Jenner was appointed and performed the "Area III" assignment, "Lee Harvey Oswald's Background."

In 1964, the U.S. Supreme Court named Jenner chairman of the Advisory Committee for the Federal Rules of Evidence—he would continue in this post until 1975.

In 1968, Lyndon B. Johnson appointed Jenner to the U.S. National Commission on the Causes and Prevention of Violence, which Johnson established in the wake of the assassinations of Martin Luther King Jr. and Robert F. Kennedy to study the causes of violence in the U.S.

1968 also saw Jenner argue his first major case at the U.S. Supreme Court, Witherspoon v. Illinois. In the following years, he would argue Mills v. Electric Auto-Lite (1970); Reliance Electric Co. v. Emerson Electric Co. (1972); Gonzales v. Automatic Employees Credit Union (1974); and Serbian Eastern Orthodox Diocese for the United States of America and Canada v. Milivojevich (1976). Jenner himself was mentioned as a preferred candidate for the Supreme Court by Johnson's Secretary of Defense, Clark Clifford, over Johnson's choice, Homer Thornberry. With the impending retirement of Chief Justice Earl Warren, Johnson hoped to elevate Associate Justice Abe Fortas to that post and Thornberry to Fortas' seat. Clifford thought Jenner would be a more acceptable candidate for Senate Republicans than Thornberry and help make them more amenable to Fortas as Chief Justice. Fortas' nomination was derailed by various scandals and withdrawn, which also ended Thornberry's nomination.

Jenner participated in the investigation into the 1969 bribery scandal at the Supreme Court of Illinois involving Chief Justice Roy Solfisburg and former Chief Justice Ray Klingbiel.

Jenner served on the board of General Dynamics. He was a friend of an attorney for the family of Henry Crown. Jenner represented Lester Crown, president of Material Service Corporation, in a 1972 bribery scandal and obtained for client immunity from prosecution in exchange for cooperating with the grand jury.

He was named in January 1974 as senior minority counsel on the impeachment inquiry staff for the Republicans on the House Judiciary Committee during the impeachment process against Richard Nixon. However, he was replaced in July 1974 after advocating for the impeachment of Nixon. The Committee later recommended impeachment.

During this time, Jenner fought (successfully) against Senator Ted Kennedy's attempt to appoint Francis X. Morrissey, a Boston Municipal Court judge whom Jenner thought was unqualified, as a federal judge. A longtime opponent of the House Un-American Activities Committee, Jenner played a role in its 1975 abolition after he filed a First Amendment challenge to HUAC in response to its investigation of Dr. Jeremiah Stamler, a prominent Chicago heart researcher.

Jenner represented convicted labor racketeer Allen Dorfman.

In the course of his career, Jenner also served as a director of General Dynamics; as a permanent member of the editorial board of the Uniform Commercial Code; and the chairman of the Committee on the Federal Judiciary of the American Bar Association. He also served on the Board of Governors of the NAACP Legal Defense Fund; as president of the American Judicature Society; and as president of the National Conference of Commissioners on Uniform State Laws.

== Legacy ==
The University of Illinois College of Law bestowed an honorary doctorate on Jenner in 1981. In 1982, Jenner endowed a professorship at the University of Illinois College of Law. The University of Illinois College of Law's library is also named in his honor.

Jenner died in 1988. His funeral was held at Holy Name Cathedral, Chicago. Illinois Governor Jim Thompson delivered a eulogy at the funeral. In that eulogy, Gov. Thompson said

When the soul of our nation was torn by the assassination of a president, our nation reached out to Bert Jenner. And when the fabric of our Constitution was threatened by the actions of a president, our nation reached out to Bert Jenner. When the wounds were deep and grievous for all Americans, when some impoverished soul was threatened, when some unpopular cause would have been extinguished but for the bravery and perseverance of that man, they all reached out for Bert Jenner.
