= David Ginsburg (lawyer) =

American political advisor and lawyer

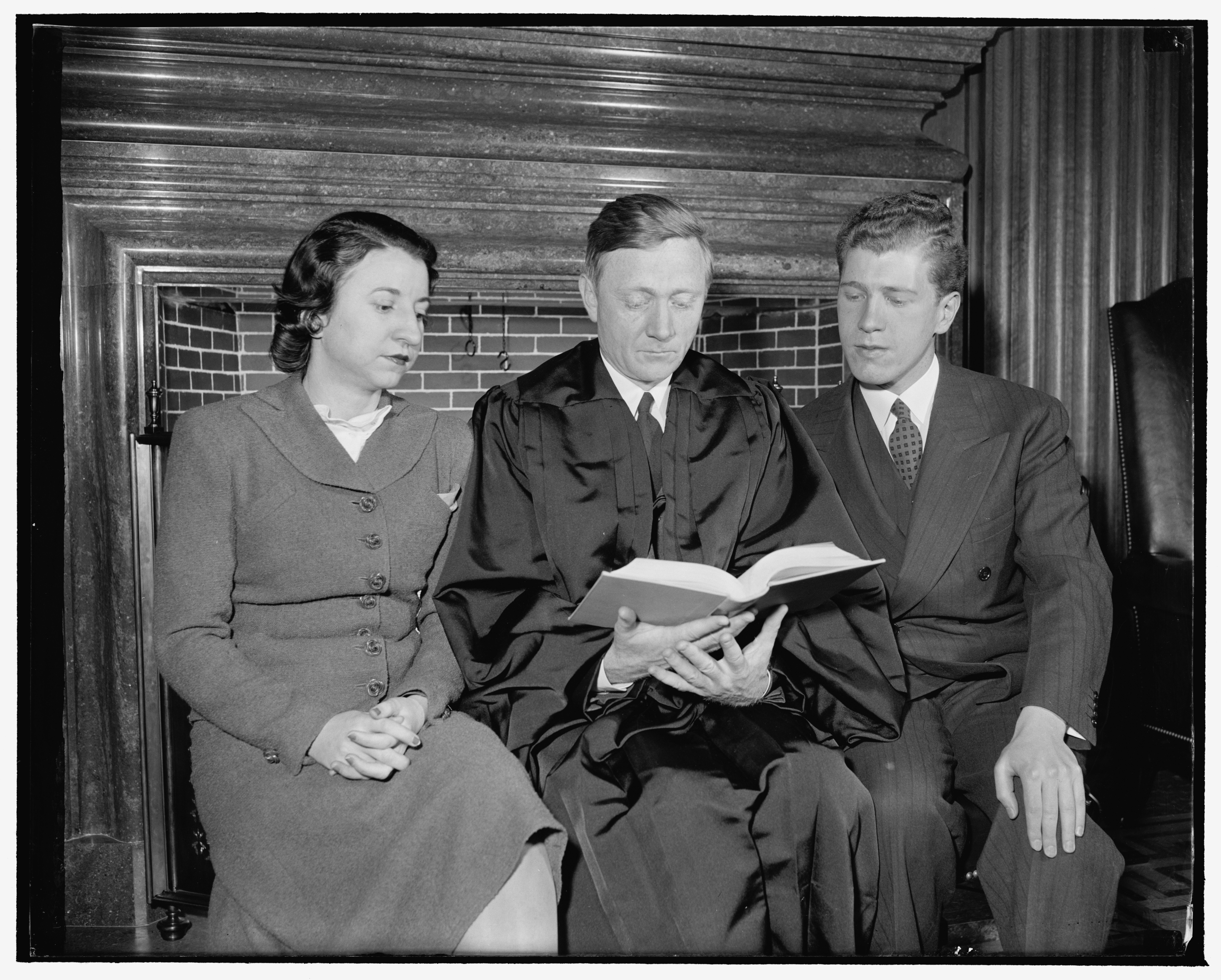
- William O. Douglas (center) confers with Ginsburg (right) and Secretary Edith Waters (left), in Washington, D.C., April 17, 1939
- Born: April 20, 1912; Manhattan
- Died: May 23, 2010 (aged 98); Alexandria, Virginia
- Education: West Virginia University; Harvard Law School
- Occupation: Lawyer
- Known for: Advisor to Franklin D. Roosevelt

Charles David Ginsburg (April 20, 1912 – May 23, 2010) was an American political advisor and lawyer who was among the founders of Americans for Democratic Action and served as executive director of the Kerner Commission, which concluded that the rioting of 1967 was caused not by radicals or riffraff but was instead a response to decades of pervasive discrimination and segregation and which warned that the U.S. was "moving toward two societies—one Black, one white, separate and unequal."

== Early life and education ==
Ginsburg was born in Manhattan on April 20, 1912, and moved with his family to Huntington, West Virginia as a child. His father ran a grocery store there, and when the Great Depression occurred, Ginsburg saw first-hand the effects that poverty had on families who were forced to cut back on their purchases. Recalling this era more than sixty years later, Ginsburg said that what affected him the most was what was happening to "the children. They were literally starving to death." He graduated from West Virginia University in 1932, having financed his education by winning typing contests and a debate scholarship, and earned his law degree from Harvard Law School in 1935.

After graduating from law school, he found a position at the U.S. Securities and Exchange Commission, with the assistance of Felix Frankfurter, interrupted by a one-year-long Supreme Court clerkship with Associate Justice William O. Douglas. During World War II, Ginsburg served on the staff of the Office of Price Administration from 1941 until his resignation in 1943, where his hires included Richard Nixon, who had just graduated from the Duke University School of Law. When he then sought to join the Army during the war, he was criticized for attempting to use influence to obtain a commission as an officer. However, President Franklin D. Roosevelt came to his support, writing that "When the political storms blow over . . . David’s patriotic, unselfish and distinguished service to his country will be duly recognized."

Ultimately, Ginsburg enlisted as a private in the United States Army, where he drove trucks for a supply unit. He later earned the rank of captain and served on the staff of General Lucius D. Clay, the Military Governor of the U.S. Occupation Zone in Germany. There, he provided guidance in the rebuilding and reconstruction of the German economy and attended portions of the Nuremberg Trials and the Potsdam Conference.

== Legal career ==
After completing his military service, Ginsburg returned to Washington and quickly became the consummate Washington insider. Recognized for his "keen wisdom and flawless honesty" and his ability "to analyze situations, get people to work together, listen attentively to competing points of view, and use his considerable legal skills to find common ground," he founded a law firm and became, along with the likes of Eleanor Roosevelt and John Kenneth Galbraith, one of the founders of Americans for Democratic Action. As counsel to the Jewish Agency and adviser to Chaim Weizmann, he also paved the way for Harry S. Truman's recognition of the state of Israel in 1948.

In 1967, President Lyndon B. Johnson appointed Ginsburg to serve as executive director of the National Advisory Commission on Civil Disorders, commonly known as the Kerner Commission after its chair, Governor Otto Kerner, Jr. of Illinois. This commission was charged with investigating as to why over 150 riots had occurred that year and to determine what could be done to prevent them from reoccurring.

Ginsburg developed the Commission's multi-faceted investigative strategy, guided the Commission through its many meetings, wrote some of its key texts, and played a large role in the eleven-member committee's unanimous adoption of the detailed and extensive report (nearly 600 pages) in only seven months.

The Commission's report became a surprise best seller, concluding that the unrest by African-Americans was a result of systematic white racism. "White society," said the report, "is deeply implicated in the ghetto . . . White institutions created it, white institutions maintain it and white society condones it." Johnson broke his relationship with Ginsburg after the release of the report, upset that his presidential efforts to defend the civil rights of all Americans were not more sufficiently credited in the report and that the report's recommendations exacerbated the budget problems that Johnson already had with Congress. Decades later, Ginsburg remained pessimistic about the future of race relations, citing the continued lag in education, housing and employment by African-Americans.

Shortly after the release of the Kerner Report on March 1, 1968, Ginsburg served as general counsel to the Democratic National Committee during the 1968 presidential campaign and helped craft Hubert Humphrey's official position pertaining to the Vietnam War during that campaign.

Much later, as attorney for Henry Kissinger, Ginsburg successfully fought to prevent the release of transcripts of Kissinger's phone conversations with President Richard Nixon as falling outside the purview of the Freedom of Information Act. The position was supported by the U.S. Supreme Court in 1980 with a 5 to 2 verdict in Kissinger v. Reporters Committee for Freedom of the Press on the basis of the fact that the discussions were not related to the executive branch of government.

== Family ==
Ginsburg continued to work forty-hour weeks into his nineties. He died at age 98 of congestive heart failure on May 23, 2010, in his home in Alexandria, Virginia. He was survived by his third wife, Marianne Lais Ginsburg, as well as a daughter, two sons and two grandchildren.

== See also ==
- List of law clerks for the fourth seat of the Supreme Court of the United States
