= Milton S. Eisenhower Foundation =

US foundation supporting efforts to reduce inner-city violence

The Milton S. Eisenhower Foundation is a non-governmental organization in the United States, established in 1981 to continue the work of two Presidential Commissions. These commissions were the bipartisan National Advisory Commission on Civil Disorders (commonly known as the Kerner Riot Commission; 1967-68), and the bipartisan National Commission on the Causes and Prevention of Violence (also known as the National Violence Commission; 1968-69). The Eisenhower Foundation carries forward the objectives and initiatives of these commissions in the private sector.

== Commissions ==
=== Kerner Commission ===
The Kerner Riot Commission operated from 1967 to 1968 and examined the civil unrest in major U.S. cities such as Detroit, Newark, and Los Angeles. reached the notable conclusion that the United States was heading towards two separate and unequal societies—one black and one white. The commission emphasized the need to fulfill the promises of American democracy for all citizens, regardless of their racial, ethnic, or minority backgrounds, including urban and rural populations. It regarded the federal government as the sole institution possessing the authority and resources to address the issue on a scale commensurate with its magnitude. The commission identified unemployment and underemployment as the most significant and persistent grievances, inadequate education, segregation, and a racially biased criminal justice system. Consequently, the commission advocated for well-funded and sustained federal investments in various areas, such as employment, job training, education, housing, income support, civil rights enforcement, and police reform. Additionally, the commission criticized certain media segments for insufficiently reporting on the root causes of civil disorder and underlying racial issues. Ultimately, the Kerner Commission emphasized the need for new attitudes, understanding, and, most importantly, a renewed determination to implement its recommendations at a national level.

=== U.S. National Commission on the Causes and Prevention of Violence ===
The Kerner Commission report was released in March 1968, following which Dr. Martin Luther King Jr. was assassinated in April 1968, and Senator Robert F. Kennedy was assassinated in June 1968. Subsequently, the National Violence Commission was established, and focused on addressing the causes and prevention of violence. In its final report the following year, the Violence Commission, like the Kerner Commission, emphasized that the lack of employment and educational opportunities in inner-city neighborhoods was the most significant policy concern. This issue was situated within a broader American economy emphasizing material success and a culture of violence, which the media effectively portrayed.

The combination of being a young, impoverished male with limited education and no means of escape from a challenging urban environment, coupled with a desire for what society deems available but predominantly accessible to others, and witnessing illegitimate and often violent methods used to achieve material success with impunity, create an immense influence that draws many towards criminality and delinquency. Moreover, the experience of discrimination and segregation faced by African American, Mexican American, or Puerto Rican American individuals further amplifies the pull of these criminogenic factors.

The Commission recommended substantial investments of $20 billion per year in 1968 dollars for job creation, training, and education. The Violence Commission advocated for a comprehensive realignment of national priorities, aligning with the Kerner Commission's moral vision that no higher claim could be placed on the nation's conscience. A majority of the National Violence Commission members, including both Republicans and Democrats, proposed measures such as the confiscation of most handguns, restrictions on new handgun ownership for individuals who could demonstrate a reasonable need, and the registration of rifle and shotgun owners. The Violence Commission concluded that throughout human history, the decline of great civilizations primarily resulted from internal decay rather than external assault. Therefore, the Commission emphasized that the response to these internal challenges would determine the greatness and durability of the nation.

== Organizing Inner City Neighborhoods: Ford Foundation Support ==
The Foundation initiated a national youth development and crime prevention demonstration program in the early and mid-1980s, supported by funding from the Ford Foundation, IBM, and various local matching partners.

Through subgrants to local nonprofit organizations, the Foundation allocated modest resources, typically totaling $50,000 to $70,000 over a span of 36 months. Emphasis was placed on community organizing, although some sites went beyond that. One notable success was the Around the Corner to the World program in Washington, D.C.'s Adams-Morgan neighborhood, which originated from Jubilee Housing, a nonprofit enterprise established by developer James Rouse, a former Eisenhower Foundation Trustee, and his Enterprise Foundation. Additional funding from the Department of Health and Human Services enabled the establishment of a weatherization business that generated employment opportunities for unemployed young adults. Although the evaluation conducted by Rutgers University lacked control or comparison groups, it revealed a significant decline in criminal involvement among program participants, contrasting with a different pattern observed in Adams Morgan and Washington, D.C. as a whole.

Securing additional funding from the Department of Health and Human Services and other sources, the Foundation introduced its neighborhood-based prevention programs in other locations, with staff providing technical assistance to strengthen the institutional capacity of local nonprofit organizations.

== Creating Inner City Youth Safe Havens and Police Ministations ==
Based on the practical experiences of early demonstrations, the Eisenhower Foundation developed a new model called the Youth Safe Haven-Police Ministration Program in the late 1980s and early 1990s. This model combined two concepts: the Carnegie Corporation's 1992 report, "A Matter of Time," which highlighted the vulnerability of inner-city youth during after-school hours, and the Japanese idea of neighborhood police administration called "koban," which is credited with contributing to Japan's low crime rates.

The Foundation, with funding from Japanese corporations, the Japanese Keidanren, and the Center for Global Partnership, organized several delegations of American police chiefs, senior police officials, and inner-city community leaders to visit Japan and observe kobans. Upon their return, delegates with the most interest in the concept were funded by the Foundation to implement a combination of safe haven programs inspired by Carnegie and Koban-inspired police administration. These Safe Haven-Ministations were established and operated by indigenous inner-city nonprofit organizations in the United States. They provided a safe space for primary and middle school children after school, offering mentoring, homework assistance, computer learning, youth development guidance, sports and cultural activities, and advocacy support. Police officers also participated in the program, engaging in community-based policing and problem-solving within the immediate neighborhood.

For the initial implementation of Safe Haven-Ministations in the United States, the Foundation matched Japanese funding with resources from the United States Department of Justice. Throughout the 1990s, these programs were launched in various cities, including Boston, Chicago, Philadelphia, and San Juan. FBI-reported serious crime in the neighborhoods where the program was implemented in these cities decreased by 22 to 27 percent, which was significantly greater than declines observed in nearby comparable neighborhoods and the cities as a whole.

In addition to the examples mentioned above, other cities that have experienced evidence-based success with the Safe Haven-Ministation model include Columbia, SC; Canton, OH; Jackson, MS; Baltimore, MD; and Dover, NH. Funding for these programs has been provided by government departments such as the Department of Justice, the Department of Housing and Urban Development, and the Department of Education, as well as foundations like Ford, Casey, and Kellogg.

Various media outlets, including ABC, CBS, BBC, the New York Times, Washington Post, Wall Street Journal, Guardian, Economist, Ashai Evening News, Mianchi Shimbun, and regional newspapers, have covered the Safe Haven-Ministation programs. The model has also been recognized as a best practice by the Department of Housing and Urban Development.

The Foundation's goal is to expand the implementation of Safe Haven-Ministations in more cities, motivated by the racial tensions that exist between minority youth and the police in the United States. The model offers the potential to simultaneously reduce crime, alleviate citizen fear, improve the lives of children and youth, and enhance community-police trust. The Foundation views the Safe Haven-Ministation model as a more effective alternative to previous strategies such as "zero tolerance," "stop and frisk," and "broken windows" policing, which have contributed to police killings and current racial tensions, as exemplified by the incidents in Ferguson, MO, and West Baltimore.

== Creating Quantum Opportunities ==
The Eisenhower Foundation conducted research on Safe Haven-Ministations and found that while they were popular among minority youth aged 7 to 12, they were less appealing to high-risk minority high school youth due to their different developmental needs and conflicts with the police. To address this, the Foundation developed the Quantum Opportunities Program, an improved version of a previous program that had initial success but struggled to scale up.

With support from the Department of Justice and private sector resources, the Foundation provided funding to local nonprofit organizations to target high-risk racial minority youth in high schools located in inner-city neighborhoods. The program involved intensive mentoring, advocacy, tutoring, life skills training, college preparation, youth leadership training, and modest stipends. An evaluation of Quantum Opportunities in multiple locations showed higher grades, graduation rates, and college acceptance rates for participants. The outcomes were statistically significant, leading to the recognition of Quantum as an exemplary evidence-based model by peer reviewers and organizations like the Department of Justice, the National Mentoring Resource Center, and Child Trends.

The success of Quantum has prompted the Foundation to seek its expansion and national sustainability, aiming to implement the program in high-risk, high schools across the country. Quantum has received media coverage, including an interview on ABC Boston, and has garnered support from various institutions and organizations. The Foundation believes that Quantum can address the needs of students in underperforming high schools by offering an alternative evidence-based model that bypasses some of the ongoing debates and controversies surrounding urban school systems.

In addition to Quantum Opportunities, the Foundation has replicated job training programs for inner-city youth that can complement Quantum Opportunities. These programs, such as Project Prepare and Argus Learning for Living, provide job training to high school students and young adults who have dropped out of school. The Foundation has collaborated with other organizations and replicated successful models in different locations.

As part of its multiple solutions approach, the Foundation plans to replicate Quantum in combination with Argus at the exact locations, targeting high school students and dropouts. The Foundation's initiatives, emphasizing the importance of alternative education and job training programs in addressing long-term problems and combating poverty.

== Updating the Presidential Commissions and Communicating the Findings ==
The Eisenhower Foundation has conducted program replications and evaluations in inner cities, resulting in reports authored or coauthored by Curtis and other Trustees. These reports aim to communicate successful strategies and learn from unsuccessful ones.

One of the Foundation's "Youth Investment and Community Reconstruction" reports focuses on a Ford Foundation-funded program that addressed youth development and crime prevention in 10 inner cities. The report summarizes the Foundation's demonstrations, describes the next generation of private-sector ventures, and proposes new national policies for inner cities based on practical experience.

Since the early 1980s, the Milton S. Eisenhower Foundation has been working to implement the agendas of the President's National Advisory Commission on Civil Disorders and the National Commission on the Causes and Prevention of Violence. The Foundation focuses on reducing urban violence and drug abuse through youth empowerment, community revitalization, and grassroots action. In 1982, the Foundation launched a neighborhood self-help crime prevention program in 10 inner cities based on these principles. Over the years, the Foundation has learned from failures and successes, answering previously challenging questions. The report addresses the effectiveness of specific strategies such as neighborhood watch, the roles of different organizations and agencies, and the use of volunteers in inner cities. It concludes that community-based organizations can effectively reduce crime and drug abuse in inner cities through comprehensive and well-funded programs.

The report received media coverage in the Washington Post by columnist David Broder and was covered internationally by the Economist.

Another report, titled "Youth Investment and Police Mentoring," focuses on the evaluation of the Safe Haven-Ministation replications. This report led to coverage on ABC World News Tonight, BBC, Washington Post, Economist, Time, and Newsweek.

Through the replication of evidence-based model programs, the Foundation has also enhanced the institutional capacity of local nonprofit organizations. The Foundation published a report in 2000 titled "Lessons From the Street: Capacity Building and Replication," which details the technical assistance provided to local nonprofits in areas such as organizational management, financial management, staff development, and fundraising.

The Foundation's replications and reports on successful inner city programs have influenced broader policy updates of the Kerner Riot Commission and National Violence Commission.

Foundation President Alan Curtis has been involved in authoring and editing the Foundation's updates of the Kerner Riot Commission, including the 25, 30, and 40-year updates. These updates have received media coverage and were discussed in various forums and hearings organized by the Foundation.

In 2008, Curtis and former Senator Fred R. Harris released the 40-year update of the Kerner Commission, titled "What Together We Can Do." The report highlights progress made since the original Kerner report, but also addresses persistent issues such as child poverty, income inequality, educational disparities, and high incarceration rates. The report provides recommendations for employment, economic, and education reforms, including the creation of safe haven investment neighborhoods and a new fair economic deal movement.

The 40-year update was covered by PBS Bill Moyers Journal, which included interviews and coverage of pre-report hearings in Detroit and Newark.
