= U.S. National Commission on the Causes and Prevention of Violence =

History
- Other short titles: National Violence Commission
- Established by: Lyndon B. Johnson on June 10, 1968
- Related Executive Order number(s): 11412

Membership
- Chairperson: Milton S. Eisenhower
- Other committee members: A. Leon Higginbotham; Hale Boggs; Terrence Cardinal Cooke; Sen. Philip A. Hart; Eric Hoffer; Sen. Roman Hruska; Patricia Roberts Harris; Leon Jaworski; Albert Jenner; William McCulloch; Ernest McFarland; Walter Menninger; Joseph R. Sahid

The U.S. National Commission on the Causes and Prevention of Violence (National Violence Commission) was formed by President Lyndon B. Johnson in Executive Order 11412 on June 10, 1968, after the April 4 assassination of Martin Luther King Jr. and the June 5 assassination of Robert F. Kennedy.

== Background ==
The National Violence Commission established task forces on assassination, group violence, individual acts of violence, law enforcement, media and violence, firearms, and violence in American history. As reported by John Herbers in the New York Times, the chairman of the commission, Milton Eisenhower, stated that the Task Force Report on Individual Acts of Violence was "by all odds the most important" of the reports written for the commission.

The National Violence Commission was formed only a few months after release of the final report of the Kerner Commission, which assessed the big city protests of the 1960s. In its final report in December 1969, the Violence Commission, as the Kerner Commission, concluded that the most important policy issue was lack of employment and educational opportunity in inner city neighborhoods. The Commission framed lack of inner city opportunity within a larger American economy that prized material success and within a tradition of violence that the media transmitted particularly well:

In one of its most important final report passages, the National Violence Commission observed:

To be a young, poor male; to be undereducated and without means of escape from an oppressive urban environment; to want what the society claims is available (but mostly to others); to see around oneself illegitimate and often violent methods being used to achieve material success; and to observe others using these means with impunity – all this is to be burdened with an enormous set of influences that pull many toward crime and delinquency. To be also a Negro, Mexican or Puerto Rican American and subject to discrimination and segregation adds considerably to the pull of these other criminogenic forces.

The Violence Commission recommended new investments in jobs, training and education – totaling $20B per year in 1968 dollars. A long run "reordering of national priorities" was in order, said the Violence Commission, which shared the Kerner Commission's moral vision that there could be no higher claim on the nation's conscience. A majority of the members of the National Violence Commission, including both Republicans and Democrats, recommended confiscation of most handguns, restrictions on new handgun ownership to those who could demonstrate reasonable need, and identification of rifle and shotgun owners. "When in man's long history other great civilizations fell", concluded the Violence Commission, "it was less often from external assault than from internal decay…The greatness and durability of most civilizations has been finally determined by how they have responded to these challenges from within. Ours will be no exception."

== Continuation ==
In 1981, the Milton S. Eisenhower Foundation was formed as the private sector continuation of both the National Violence Commission and Kerner Commission.

Founding and other early Eisenhower Foundation Trustees included: A. Leon Higginbotham, former Vice Chair of the National Violence Commission and federal Third Circuit Court of Appeals Judge; Fred Harris, former Member of the Kerner Riot Commission and former United States Senator; Nicholas deB. Katzenbach, former Chairman of the 1966 President's Commission on Law Enforcement and Administration of Justice and former Attorney General of the United States; David Ginsburg, former executive director of the Kerner Riot Commission and Counselor to the President during the Johnson Administration; Milton Eisenhower, former Chair of the National Violence Commission and President Emeritus of Johns Hopkins University; Patricia Roberts Harris, former Member of the National Violence Commission and former Secretary of Housing and Urban Development; Edward Brooke, former Member of the Kerner Riot Commission and former United States Senator; Marvin Wolfgang, former co-director of Research on the National Violence Commission and Professor of Criminology at the University of Pennsylvania; Henry Cisneros, former Secretary of Housing and Urban Development and former Mayor of San Antonio; Lloyd Cutler, former executive director of the National Violence Commission and former Counselor to Presidents Carter and Clinton; Elmer Staats, former Comptroller General of the United States; James Rouse, President of the Rouse Corporation and Founder of the Enterprise Foundation; Frank Stanton, former President of CBS, Inc., and Chairman of the American Red Cross; and Alan Curtis, President of the Eisenhower Foundation.

Mindful of the findings of the two Commissions, the Trustees of the Foundation focused on the inner city. As it evolved, the Foundation's mission was to identify, finance, replicate, evaluate, communicate, advocate for and scale up politically feasible multiple solution inner city ventures. The priority was on wraparound and evidence based strategies that worked for the inner city and high risk racial minority youth. Over the decades, examples of evidence-based inner city Eisenhower Foundation successes have included the Quantum Opportunities Program, the Youth Safe Haven-Police Ministation Program, the Argus Learning for Living Program and Full Service Community Schools.

== Updates ==
The Eisenhower Foundation has released two updates of the National Violence Commission, as well as updates of the Kerner Riot Commission. Eisenhower Foundation President Alan Curtis edited the Foundation's 15 year update of the Violence Commission, published by Yale University Press in 1985. Curtis and Eisenhower Foundation Trustee Elliott Currie, Professor of Criminology, Law and Society at the University of California, Irvine, co-authored the Foundation's 30 year update in 1999.

The 1985 National Violence Commission update was featured on the CBS Evening News with Dan Rather and presented in a forum at the Harvard Kennedy School, a forum at the John F. Kennedy Library in Boston, and a forum at the United States Senate at which Senator Edward Kennedy was keynote speaker. The Senate forum was published in a special issue of the Annals of the American Academy of Political and Social Science edited by Curtis and covered in a story in Foundation News. The Foundation News story concluded:

The policy message that emerged from the [Senate forum] participants was clear. Using a public-private approach, efforts should be made to combine employment, community involvement and family to prevent crime; move away from a federal policy of increased incarceration; reverse the "trickle down" policy of federal anti-crime programs affecting neighborhoods to a "bubble-up" process emanating from the local level; and formulate a new cooperative role for police as supporters, not strictly enforcers.

Titled To Establish Justice, To Insure Domestic Tranquility, the 1999 update of the National Violence Commission was featured in a debate on the PBS NewsHour with Jim Lehrer. Curtis observed to reporter Ray Suarez:

The original Violence Commission predicted that we would have a city of the future in which the middle class would escape to the suburbs, drive to work in sanitized quarters, and work in buildings protected by high tech. That city of the future has come true. An editorial in the Detroit Free Press said that city was Detroit.

Domestic tranquility is roughly the same [in 1999 as in 1969] in spite of the increase in prison building. On the other hand, we haven’t had an increase in justice. We have 25 percent of all our young children living in poverty. We have the greatest inequality in terms of wealth and income and wages in the world. One of every three African-Americans is in prison, on probation or on parole at any one time – and one out of every two in cities.

That is a direct result of the racial bias in our sentencing system and our mandatory minimum sentences. For example, crack-cocaine sentences are longer, and crack cocaine is used more by minorities. Powder cocaine sentences are shorter, and powder cocaine is used more by whites. The result is that our prison populations are disproportionately filled with racial minorities. Yet, at the same time, prison building has become a kind of economic development policy for [white] communities which send lobbyists to Washington.

In addition, the National Violence Commission updates were covered by news stories in the Washington Post, Los Angeles Times, Newsweek and USA Today, interviews on NPR, and editorials in the Detroit Free Press, Philadelphia Daily News and Chicago Tribune, among other media.

For example, the 1999 Detroit Free Press editorial focused on the Violence Commission's 1969 "city of the future" prediction of "suburban neighborhoods, increasingly far-removed from the central city, with homes fortified by an array of security devices; high-speed police-patrolled expressways becoming sterilized corridors connecting safe areas [and] urban streets that will be unsafe in differing degrees…That was in 1969. Sounds like any metropolitan area you know?"

== Firearms policy ==
In 2012, after the Sandy Hook Elementary School shooting in Newtown, Connecticut, the Washington Post published commentary by Curtis that reminded the nation of how, in 1969, a majority of National Violence Commission members, including both Republicans and Democrats, recommended confiscation of most handguns, restrictions on new handgun ownership to those who could demonstrate reasonable need, and identification of rifle and shotgun owners.

The Eisenhower Foundation states on its website:

Given that America is the only advanced industrialized nation in the world without effective firearms regulations and given that America, not surprisingly, therefore leads the industrialized world in firearms killings, the Foundation believes a new grassroots coalition against firearms in America should build on the recommendations of the National Violence Commission and better integrate the advocacy of, among others, the Brady Campaign, Mayors Against Illegal Guns, the Children's Defense Fund, racial minorities, women, outraged parents, teachers, youthful voters, grandparents and voters who view firearms control as a key policy against terrorist acts and mass killings.

== Membership ==
Members of the commission were:

- Milton Eisenhower, Chair – and President Emeritus of Johns Hopkins University
- A. Leon Higginbotham, Vice Chair and U.S. Third Court of Appeals Judge
- Hale Boggs, Congressman (D-LA)
- Terrence Cardinal Cooke, Archbishop of New York
- Philip A. Hart, Senator (D-MI)
- Eric Hoffer, longshoreman, migratory worker and philosopher
- Roman Hruska, Senator (R-NE)
- Patricia Roberts Harris, Attorney and former Ambassador to Luxembourg
- Leon Jaworski, Attorney
- Albert Jenner, Attorney
- William McCulloch, Congressman (R-OH)
- Ernest McFarland, Arizona Supreme Court Justice
- Walter Menninger, Psychiatrist, Menninger Foundation
