= Walter E. Hoadley =

American economist and statistician

- Born: August 16, 1916
- Died: February 19, 2003
- Known for: Statistics, business economics

Academic background
- Education: University of California, Berkeley

Walter E. Hoadley (1916 – 2003) was an American business economist, statistician, and Federal Reserve Bank chair. He served as president of the American Statistical Association and the American Finance Association.

== Career ==
Hoadley earned three academic degrees at the University of California, Berkeley, an A.B. in 1938, an M.A. in 1940, and a Ph.D. in economics in 1946.

He went on to serve as an economics professor at UC Berkeley, and a vice president of the Bank of America. Hoadley retired from the Bank of America in 1981. He developed expertise in economic forecasting, global financial markets, planning, and management. The Commonwealth Club of California invited him to give public speeches 25 times.

After retiring from the Bank of America in 1981, he joined the Hoover Institution as a senior scholar.

== Personal life ==
Hoadley married college classmate Virginia Alm and they were together more than 60 years. He was a devoted Methodist and spoke frequently of the importance of his religion to him (Miller, p.v).

== Publication ==
- Looking Behind the Crystal Ball: How to Use a Business Economist Successfully, 1988
