= 2017 Anaheim protests =

- Date: February 21, 2017
- Location: Anaheim, California, U.S.
- Caused by: Altercation between LAPD officer and 13-year old civilian.
- Methods: Protests, rioting, Vandalism

Parties
City of Anaheim; Anaheim Police Department	Local demonstrators

Number
	300

Casualties
- Arrested: 24

On the evening of February 22, 2017, protests erupted in Anaheim, California, over the altercation between an off-duty Los Angeles Police Department officer Kevin Ferguson and unnamed 13-year-old that occurred on February 21 and was recorded on a bystander's cell phone camera. In the incident that sparked the protests, a 13-year-old boy was grabbed by an off-duty LAPD officer outside the officer's house, and the 13-year-old's acquaintances tried to confront the officer. The officer took out his handgun and fired one shot near a group of youth; nobody was injured. The 13-year-old and another boy were arrested.

== Background ==
On the afternoon of February 21, a number of teenage boys were involved in an altercation with an off-duty Los Angeles Police Department officer. The unnamed officer and one of the boys got into an argument, which prompted one of the boys to threaten the officer. The officer drew his gun and shot away from the boys causing a fight between them and the officer. One unidentified 13-year-old was arrested and taken to the Orange County Juvenile under suspected allegations of criminal threat and battery. Additionally, a 15-year-old boy was arrested under suspicion of assault and battery, but was subsequently released to his parents.

The officer was not arrested, nor has he been identified, but has been placed on administrative leave by the LAPD.

== Protesting ==
The next evening, several protestors gathered in the neighborhood where the altercation and shooting occurred. The protests began calmly as the individuals encouraged peaceful protests, although chants expressing concerns over police brutality and child maltreatment eventually started. The uprising led to damage to the officer's property, including his garage door and truck. The protesters were retained by other protesters before others threw garbage and bricks at Anaheim police officers.

== Aftermath ==
Anaheim Mayor Tom Tait expressed concern about the video that showed the altercation between the officer and boys, and said the city is committed to an investigation on the incident. It was determined that the gun fired by the officer was not his service weapon.

LAPD Officer Kevin Ferguson was not charged with any crimes, despite allegations of excessive force, and questionable legal standing to detain the child.

The family of a child involved in the altercation filed suit against Kevin Ferguson and the LAPD, which were later dropped.
