= Basic Black (TV series) =

American television series

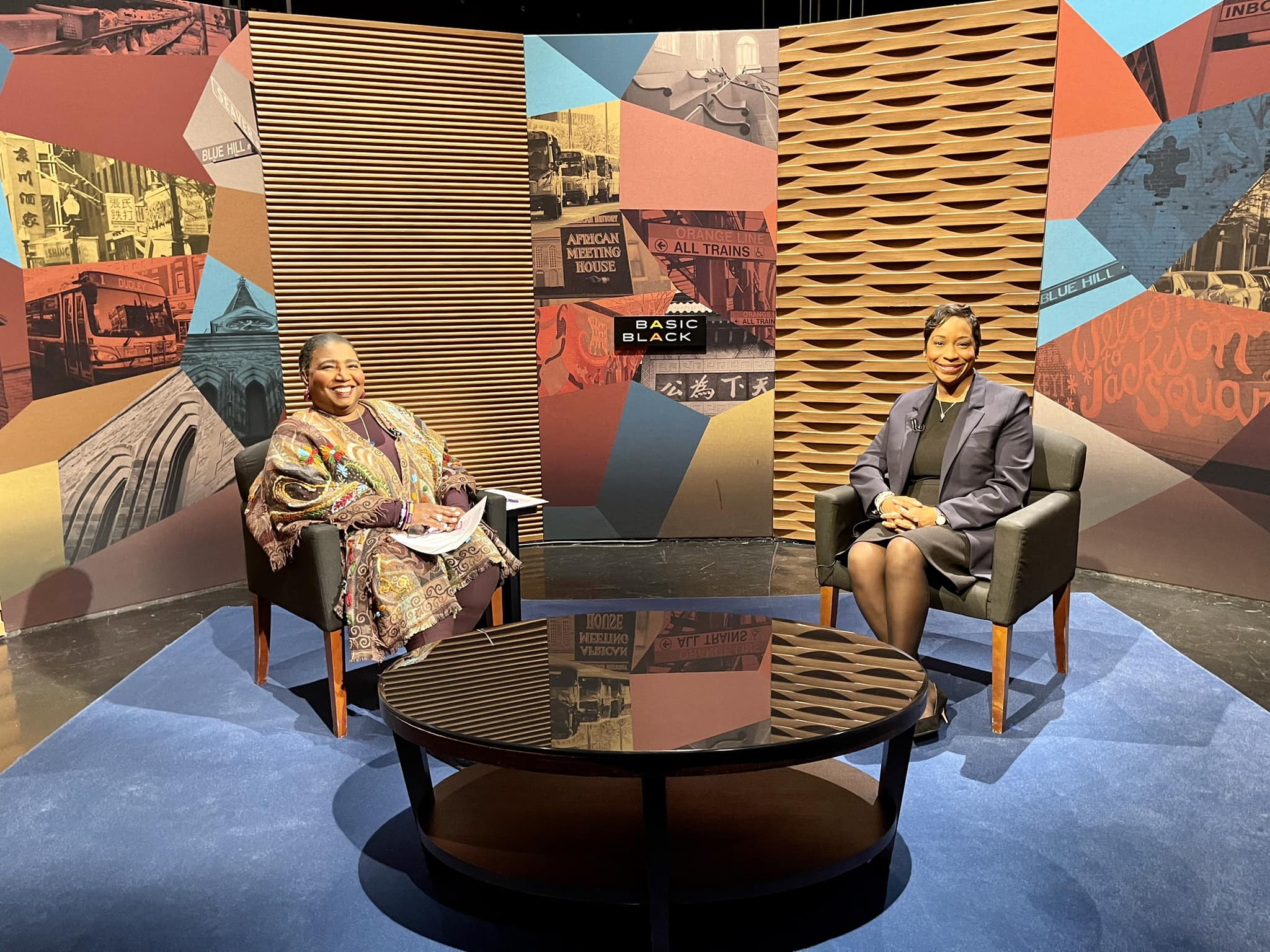
Andrea Campbell being interviewed by host Callie Crossley on the WGBH public affairs television series Basic Black

Basic Black is a weekly television series airing on WGBH in Boston. Originally known as Say Brother, the show was created in 1968 and aims to reflect the concerns and culture of African Americans through short-form documentaries, performances, and one-on-one conversations.

Say Brother and Basic Black together represent WGBH Boston's longest-running public affairs program produced by, for and about African Americans. In April 2000, the WGBH Media Library and Archives was awarded a National Endowment for the Humanities Archives and Special Collections Preservation and Access grant to preserve Say Brother tapes dating from 1968 to 1982. The Say Brother Collection is accessible online in the American Archive of Public Broadcasting including 83 programs and interviews.

== See also ==
- Black public affairs television
