= The Millennium Breach =

1998 followup by Eisenhower Foundation to 1968 Kerner Commission Report

The Millennium Breach: The American Dilemma, Richer and Poorer was sponsored by the Eisenhower Foundation to mark the thirtieth anniversary of the Kerner Report on March 1, 1998. The Kerner Report was released by the Kerner Commission, a committee established by President Lyndon B. Johnson in 1968 to investigate the causes of the 1967 race riots in the United States and to provide recommendations for the future. The infamous passage of the Kerner Report found, "Our nation is moving toward two societies, one black, one white—-separate and unequal."

== Findings ==
The Millennium Breach was written by Fred R. Harris, Lynn A. Curtis, and other Eisenhower trustees. The Breach presents the Foundation’s position on practical policy and how to replicate the grassroots non-profit, inner-city programs that have been effective since the release of the original Kerner Report in 1968. It targets private and public policymakers and inner-city community practitioners.

The breach documents the following trends since the release of the Kerner Report in 1968:

1. From 1977 to 1988, the incomes of the richest 1 percent in America increased by 120 percent and the incomes of the poorest fifth in America decreased by 10 percent
2. In urban public schools in poor neighborhoods, more than two-thirds of children fail to reach even the "basic" level of national tests.
3. During the 1980s, child poverty increased by over 20 percent, with racial minorities suffering disproportionately. In 1998, the child poverty rate in the United States was 4 times the average of Western European countries
4. Over the 1980s and early 1990s, the U.S. tripled the number of prison cells and simultaneously reduced housing appropriations for the poor by over 80 percent.
5. In the early 1990s, 1 of 4 young African-American men was in prison, on probation, or on parole. By the late 1990s, 1 of 3 young African-American men was in prison, on probation, or on parole.

== Recommendations ==
The report recommended the adoption of national policies based on what the Eisenhower Foundation believed to have been effective policies in education, employment, economic, development, race and criminal justice since the Kerner Commission. The following policies were recommended:

1. Fully fund the Head Start Program for all eligible children in pre-school
2. Replicate effective school and housing desegregation and renewing affirmative action
3. Create a national nonprofit "Corporation for Youth Investment" that will provide boys-and-girls-club-type safe havens after school for kids 6 to 16
4. Reform public schools by restructuring academic programs; providing focused intervention for children with mental health problems; creating safe environments during the day and supportive nonprofit safe havens after school; increasing involvement of and assistance to inner city parents; reducing class size
5. Reorder the budget in the "war on drugs" from 70 percent enforcement and 30 percent prevention and treatment to 50/50.
