= Tony Brown (journalist) =

American journalist, academic and businessman (1933–2026)

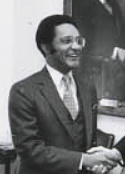
- Brown in 1981
- Born: William Anthony Brown; April 11, 1933; Charleston, West Virginia, U.S.
- Died: June 17, 2026 (aged 93); Newport News, Virginia, U.S.
- Occupations: Journalist, College Dean - Hampton University, President/CEO - Tony Brown Productions, academian, comedian, businessman
- Website: tonybrownsjournal.com

William Anthony Brown (April 11, 1933 – June 17, 2026) was an American journalist, academic and businessman. He is best known as the commentator of the long-running syndicated television show Tony Brown's Journal.

== Early life ==
Brown was born April 11, 1933, to Royal Brown and Catherine Davis Brown in Charleston, West Virginia. He attended the public schools where he excelled in academics, joined the track team, and performed in various school plays. His experience of segregation and poverty as a child later fueled his activism and view on the U.S. government as an adult.

== Personal life and death ==
Brown joined the Republican Party in 1990, saying he supported its "basic concept of market economy and self-help", which he contrasted with the Democrats' "philosophy of dependence on government". He died at his home in Newport News, Virginia, on June 17, 2026, at the age of 93.

== Accomplishments ==
- 1953–1955, Brown served in the U.S. Army
- 1959, he received a BA degree in sociology from Wayne State University.
- 1961, he received an MA degree in Psychiatric Social Work from Wayne State University. He was a former faculty member at Central Washington University and Federal City College.
- 1962, he became a drama critic for the Detroit Courier
- In 1971, he became executive producer (and sometime host) of the monthly TV program Black Journal.
- 1972, he became the founding dean of Howard University's School of Communication.
- In 1988, Brown wrote, produced, and directed the film The White Girl, which dramatized an African American student's struggle with cocaine addiction.
- 1998, he wrote Empower The People: A 7-Step plan to Overthrow the Conspiracy that is Stealing Your Money and Freedom
- 2002, he was inducted into the National Academy of Television Arts and Sciences' Silver Circle.
- 2004, he became the dean of Hampton University's Scripps Howard School of Journalism and Communications. He held the position until 2009, when he stepped down.

== Bibliography ==
- 1995: Black Lies, White Lies: The Truth According to Tony Brown. 1997 reprint ISBN 9780688132705
- 1999: Empower the People: Overthrow The Conspiracy That Is Stealing Your Money And Freedom. ISBN 9780688157623
- 2004: What Mama Taught Me: The Seven Core Values of Life. ISBN 9780060188696

== See also ==
- Black conservatism in the United States
