= Tony Brown's Journal =

- Presented by: Tony Brown
- Country of origin: United States

Production
- Producer: Tony Brown
- Production company: Tony Brown Productions

Original release
- Network: PBS
- Release: 1978 – 2008

Tony Brown's Journal is an American talk show hosted by journalist Tony Brown. The program, which began on commercial television in syndication from 1978, then moved to PBS in 1982, was the successor to the series Black Journal, which had aired on the television network's NET and then PBS since 1968 and was produced and hosted by Brown from 1970. It ended in 2008.

== Overview ==
Television talk show series featuring interviews with contemporary newsmakers of special interest to the African American community.

== Featured topics ==
- "The Ethnic Flaw 1984" with Thomas Sowell discussing Affirmative Action
- Black College Day, 1980
- Black Revolt in the 80s
- "Songs for the Spirit" discussing the rise in popularity of nihilistic and satanic rock among American youth
- Martin Luther King Jr.
- "Tribute to Eubie Blake"
- Black Men and AIDS
- Lynching of Emmett Till
- "When the Eagle Flies - The Impact of the Black Soldier"
- Assassination of Malcolm X
- Black astronaut, Frederick Drew Gregory
- The Black Woman's Experience
- America's Black Eagles
- Black Stars in Hollywood
- "When the Chickens Came Home to Roost", Award-winning 1982 New York stage hit
- The Sullivan Principles
- "Inside the Klan", interview with Stetson Kennedy regarding his infiltration and exposure of the Ku Klux Klan
