= Kerner Commission =

National Advisory Commission on Civil Disorders (1967–1968)

- National Advisory Commission on Civil Disorders

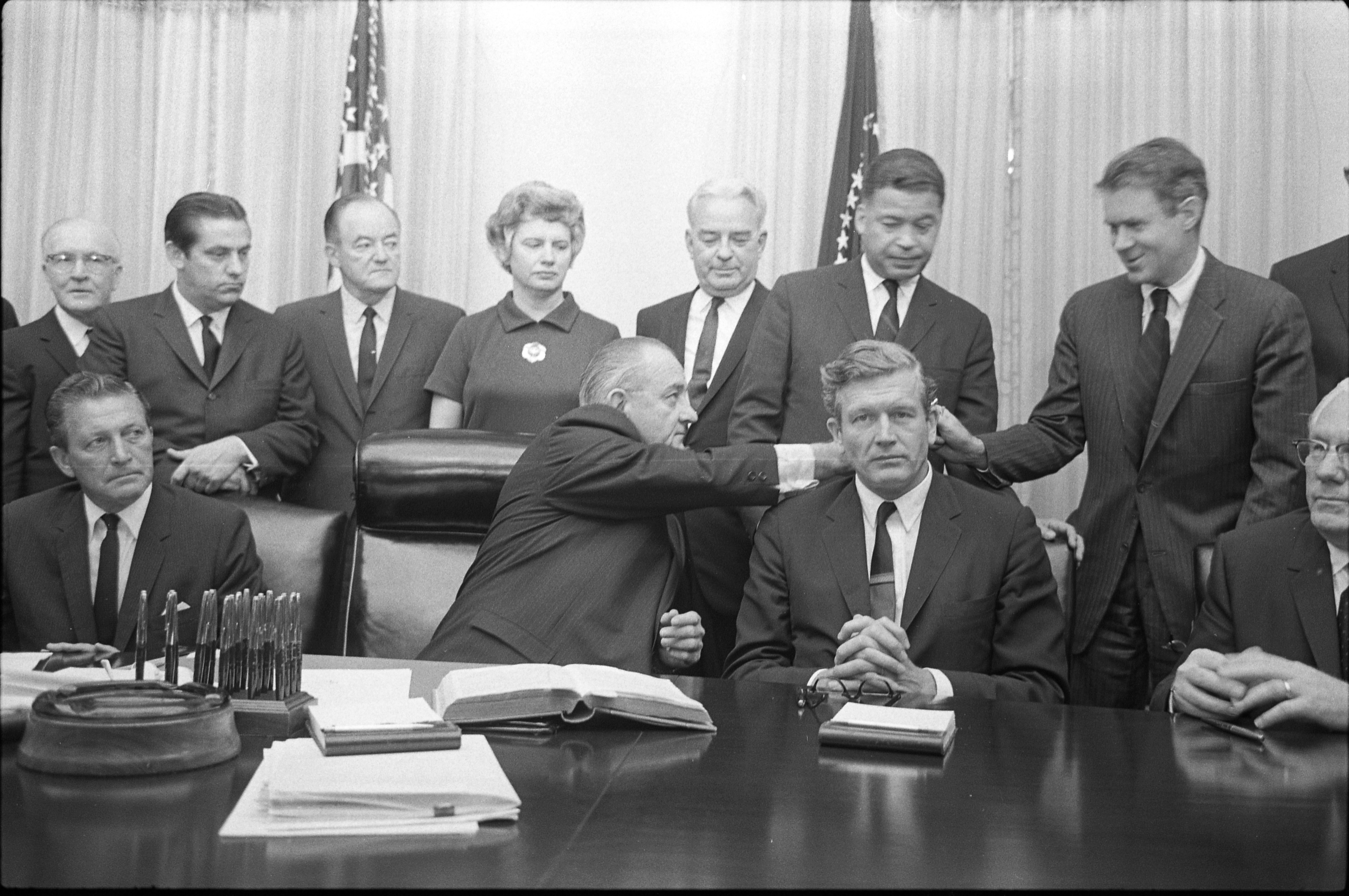
- President Lyndon Baines Johnson with some members of the National Advisory Commission on Civil Disorders (Kerner Commission) in the Cabinet Room of the White House, Washington, D.C.

History
- Status: Defunct
- Established by: Lyndon B. Johnson on 28 July 1967
- Related Executive Order number(s): 11365

Jurisdiction
- Purpose: Investigate the causes of a recent outbreak of race riots, with a particular focus on the 1967 Detroit riots.

The National Advisory Commission on Civil Disorders, known as the Kerner Commission after its chair, Governor Otto Kerner Jr. of Illinois, was an 11-member Presidential Commission established in July 1967 by President Lyndon B. Johnson in Executive Order 11365 to investigate the causes of over 150 race riots throughout the United States in the summer of 1967. The Commission sought to provide recommendations that would prevent the riots from reoccurring. The 426-page Kerner Report described the riots as a continuation of centuries of Black rebellion since the arrival of enslaved Africans in colonial North America and concluded that the direct cause of the riots lay in the social consequences of white racism, such as disparities in housing, employment, education and policing. However, the Johnson administration did not directly address the report's recommendations, as they were perceived to be unpopular with conservatives.

The report was released in 1968 after seven months of investigation. Rather than attributing the rioting to a small group of outsiders or trouble-makers ("riffraff") as many prior riot investigations had done or to radicals or a foreign conspiracy as almost three-fourths of white America believed, the Commission concluded that the rioting was a response to decades of "pervasive discrimination and segregation." Said the Commission, "White racism is essentially responsible for the explosive mixture which has been accumulating in our cities since the end of World War II . . . What white Americans have never fully understood--but what the Black can never forget, is that white society is deeply implicated in the ghetto. White institutions created it, white institutions maintain it, and white society condones it."

The Commission's 426-page report is regarded as "the touchstone for race relations" and as "one of the two seminal works" on race in this country. It was also a bestseller, outselling even the Warren Report which dealt with President Kennedy's assassination.

== Background ==
President Johnson appointed the Commission on July 28, 1967, while rioting was still underway in Detroit. There had been mounting civil unrest in a few predominantly Black and Hispanic neighborhoods since 1965, but what happened in 1967 shocked and terrified much of America as the evening news seemed to regularly show National Guardsmen and police crouching behind parked cars, tanks rumbling down dark streets, towering fires, and blocks and blocks of rubble and broken windows.

In his remarks upon signing the order to establish the Commission, Johnson asked for answers to three basic questions about the riots: "What happened? Why did it happen? What can be done to prevent it from happening again and again?"

== Operations ==
David Ginsburg was selected by President Johnson to serve as the Commission's executive director within two days of the Commission's official creation. Victor Palmieri was then hired by Ginsburg several weeks later to serve as the Commission's deputy executive director. A staff of approximately 200 was quickly hired and an elaborate, multi-faceted strategy for investigating the rioting, determining who had rioted and why, and for developing recommendations was developed. This methodology featured examining the characteristics of 13,000 people who had been arrested for rioting, sending six-member field teams to over twenty cities, interviewing state and local law enforcement personnel, using FBI reports, studying census bureau data, and talking to and conducting public opinion polling of riot area residents.

The Commission was also aided by the work of the National Advisory Panel on Insurance in Riot-Affected Areas, which was appointed by President Johnson and by an advisory panel on private enterprise that the Commission itself created. The insurance committee, which became known as the Hughes Panel after its chairman, New Jersey governor Richard Hughes, was created because of the concern that insurance companies, which had already begun abandoning minority areas in the years before 1967, would only accelerate this trend now that massive property damage had occurred in cities like Newark and Detroit. This committee's recommendations were summarized and included as Chapter 14 in the Kerner Report. The Commission's private enterprise panel was created to identify what incentives might encourage businesses to hire low-income workers or expand or relocate to low-income/minority areas. Its recommendations were included in the "employment" subsection of Chapter 17 in the Kerner Report.

== Report summary ==
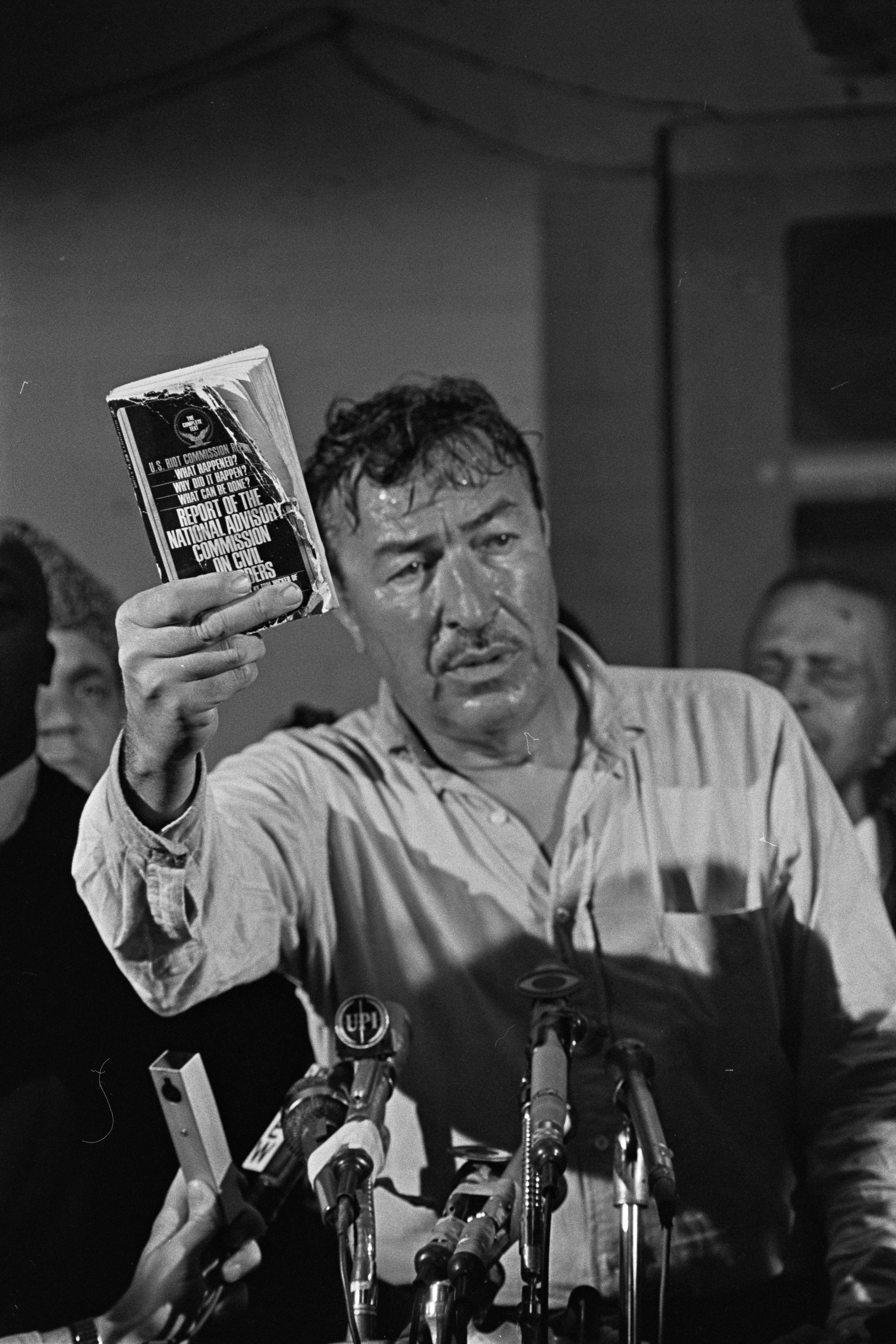
Representative Adam Clayton Powell Jr. holds a copy of the Report of the National Advisory Commission on Civil Disorders, March 23, 1968

Report of the National Advisory Commission on Civil Disorders

The Commission's final work, Report of the National Advisory Commission on Civil Disorders or Kerner Report, was issued on February 29, 1968. The Report became an instant bestseller, and more than two million Americans bought copies of the 426-page document. Its primary finding was that the riots resulted from Black frustration at the lack of economic opportunity and the manner in which they were treated by white society, especially by the police. Martin Luther King Jr. pronounced the report a "physician's warning of approaching death, with a prescription for life."

The report was made available through the US Government Printing Office, but it was Bantam Books who published the full report that most people purchased or read. Bantam published it in an inexpensive, mass-market paperback book format with an introduction written by Tom Wicker of The New York Times.

The report berated federal and state governments for failed housing, education, and social-service policies. The report also aimed some of its sharpest criticism at the media. "The press has too long basked in a white world looking out of it, if at all, with white men's eyes and white perspective." The report combined a detailed description of how eight riots unfolded and ended with governmental statistics that demonstrated the differences in living conditions between America's Black and white populations. It also included a chapter on African American history and a chapter on how the European immigrant experience differed from what Blacks were experiencing and a vast array of recommendations pertaining to the police, the justice system, property insurance, the media, employment, education, welfare, and housing".

The report's best-known passage warned: "Our nation is moving toward two societies, one black, one white—separate and unequal."

It concluded that the main cause of the violence was white racism and suggested that white America bore much of the responsibility for Black rioting and rebellion. Its study of arrested rioters found that these individuals were not transients, habitual criminals, or unemployed troublemakers. In fact, these individuals were usually lifelong residents of the city where they rioted, they had actually stayed in school a little longer and had previously been arrested no more than the average person from their neighborhood, and they had a job (albeit one that did not pay particularly well).

It is also important to note that neither the Commission nor the FBI found any evidence that the rioting was the result of a local, national or foreign conspiracy.

The Report called for an end to de facto segregation, the creation of new jobs, the construction of new housing, major changes to the welfare program, and the diversification of local police and the media.

The Commission further noted that:

- "Unless there are sharp changes in the factors influencing Negro settlement patterns within metropolitan areas, there is little doubt that the trend toward Negro majorities will continue."
- "Providing employment for the swelling Negro ghetto population will require ...opening suburban residential areas to Negroes and encouraging them to move closer to industrial centers..."
- "[c]ities will have Negro majorities by 1985 and the suburbs ringing them will remain largely all white unless there are major changes in Negro fertility rates, in migration settlement patterns or public policy."
- "[w]e believe that the emphasis of the program should be changed from traditional publicly built slum based high rise projects to smaller units on scattered sites."

Findings from the Hughes Panel were also published separately from the Kerner Report under a report titled, Meeting The Insurance Crisis Of Our Cities, in January 1968. This panel found that insurance not being available was a contributor toward creating the conditions that spawned these civil disturbances. It specifically found that, from a survey of 3,000 businesses and homeowners in six major cities, 30% of homeowners and 40% of businesses had "faced serious insurance problems".

== Reception ==
The report received widespread media coverage and had many mixed responses. Media coverage primarily looked at the recommendations and the report's summary.

Conservatives disliked that blame was placed on white institutions and society and thought rioters were "let off the hook." Richard Nixon, then running for president, pointed to the commission’s report to show liberals coddle criminals and don’t understand the frustrations of the middle class. “The major weakness of the presidential weakness of the presidential commission is that it, in effect, blames everybody for the riots except the perpetrators of the riots,” Nixon said in a 1968 radio interview. He argued the real answer to riots is force and ‘retaliation against the perpetrators and planners of violence.” The response of Black news groups was mixed towards the report. Some Black newspapers like the New York Amsterdam News and those they interviewed thought that the report did not have any new findings and was simply mirroring what Black people already knew. Others were happy that the report was simply acknowledging racism.

President Johnson, who had already pushed through the Civil Rights Act and the Voting Rights Act, largely rejected the Commission's report. It is thought that he disliked it because of a number of reasons: that the report did not adequately acknowledge the accomplishments of his Administration, that its call for "unprecedented levels of funding" was unrealistic and only exacerbated the budget problems that he was already having with Congress, and that he felt that a conspiracy had to be involved given the magnitude of the rioting.

A Harris poll taken about a month after the report was released found that only 37% of surveyed whites believed that the riots were mainly caused by racism. However, an earlier poll taken immediately after the Newark and Detroit riots had found that a much smaller amount—16%--had believed this to be true eight months earlier.

== Legacy ==
In April 1968, one month after the Kerner Report was published, Martin Luther King Jr. was assassinated and rioting of protest and grief broke out in more than 100 cities. Although this rioting seemed to indicate that America was on its way to successive years of racially-oriented urban violence, which many feared, the rioting largely disappeared after 1968. It was not until 1980 that such rioting returned, and it was only in one city—Miami. It was then another twelve years until the Rodney King riot in Los Angeles that another significant disorder occurred.

It is generally thought that much of the Report has been ignored and that its recommendations have not been implemented.

A number of its "National Action" recommendations have been addressed to questionable effectiveness, as per the criticism of each policy: Congress passed the Fair Housing Act about one month after the report's completion, and within a few years, funding for the nation's two largest urban aid programs (Model Cities and urban renewal), as well as federal aid for education, had been doubled. In addition, Congress passed the Community Development Act to build on the Fair Housing Act towards helping housing equality. Many of its major policing and riot control recommendations were also adopted: police forces are much more racially diverse than they were in 1967, formal grievance processes are now in place in almost every city, many cities utilize community policing programs which seek to get officers out of the patrol car so that they can build a rapport with the people on their beats. Police brutality is a massive social issue as evidenced by the many protests against them, such as those for George Floyd, Breonna Taylor, and Freddie Gray. Mental disorders are now handled much differently than they were in 1967, police utilize new crowd control techniques like banning the firing of weapons over the heads of the crowd as a dispersal technique. Funding for mental asylums has been decimated as a result of the deinstitutionalization trend in public policy of the 1980s and austerity measures. The report itself has been cited in major housing discrimination and desegregation court cases and in economic studies. Its "two societies" warning has become a form of socio-political shorthand that is frequently used whenever there is a tragic police incident. Presidents Richard Nixon, Gerald Ford, Ronald Reagan, and Donald Trump espoused a law and order platform that favored strong policing and suppression of riots. As the Report predicted, incidents of police brutality continued to spark riots and protest marches even after the 1960s had ended, although substantially much smaller in number, frequency and intensity, including the 1980 Miami riots, 1989 Miami riot, 1992 Los Angeles riots and West Las Vegas riots, 1992 Washington Heights riots, St. Petersburg, Florida riots of 1996, Cincinnati riots of 2001, 2013 Flatbush Riots, 2009 and 2010 riots associated with the shooting of Oscar Grant, 2014 Oakland riots, 2014 Ferguson unrest, 2015 Baltimore protests, 2016 Charlotte riot, 2016 Milwaukee riots, 2017 Anaheim protests, 2017 St. Louis protests and the 2020 George Floyd protests.

Many of its recommendations have not been enacted as of 2024. Head Start has never been funded at the level that the Commission desired nor has the Commission's major welfare and job training recommendations been adopted. What may be more accurate to state about the Report is that instead of it being ignored or forgotten is that its implementation has not been "consistent with the scope and urgency" of its recommendations.

=== Continuation of the Commission ===
The Milton S. Eisenhower Foundation (the Eisenhower Foundation) was formed in 1981 to support the findings of the Kerner Commission and of the 1968 National Commission on the Causes and Prevention of Violence (the National Violence Commission). Kerner Commission Executive Director Ginsburg, Kerner Commissioner and Senator Fred Harris (D-OK) and Kerner Commissioner and Senator Edward Brooke (R-MA) were among the founding trustees of the Eisenhower Foundation. The Foundation has released 25 year, 30 year and 40 year updates of the Kerner Commission's final report.

To mark the 30th anniversary of the Kerner Report, the Eisenhower Foundation in 1998 sponsored two complementary reports, The Millennium Breach and Locked in the Poorhouse. The Millennium Breach, co-authored by commissioner Harris, found the racial divide had grown in the subsequent years with inner city unemployment at crisis levels. The Millennium Breach found that most of the decade that followed the Kerner Report, America made progress on the principal fronts the report dealt with: race, poverty, and inner cities. Then progress stopped and in some ways reversed by a series of economic shocks and trends and the government's action and inaction.

Harris reported in Locked in the Poorhouse, "Today, thirty years after the Kerner Report, there is more poverty in America, it is deeper, blacker and browner than before, and it is more concentrated in the cities, which have become America's poorhouses."

== Criticism ==
Gary T. Marx, one of the Commission's consultant sociologists, wishes the report would have given every-day examples of the discrimination that existed in 1967. Without them, it enabled whites to believe that the Commission was incorrect or talking about someone else.

Conservatives were critical of the cost of the Commission's many recommendations (there were over 170) at a time when the nation was already trying to fight both a domestic war on poverty and a war in Vietnam. Said one congressman: "The recommendations of the President's panel can be summed up in three words. 'Spend more money.'"

At a 1998 lecture commemorating the 30th anniversary of the Report, Stephan Thernstrom, a conservative voice and a professor of history at Harvard University, argued: "Because the commission took for granted that the riots were the fault of white racism, it would have been awkward to have had to confront the question of why liberal Detroit blew up while Birmingham and other Southern cities — where conditions for blacks were infinitely worse — did not. Likewise, if the problem was white racism, why didn't the riots occur in the 1930s, when prevailing white racial attitudes were far more barbaric than they were in the 1960s?"

Others refute this criticism by pointing to the importance of expectations—in Alabama and other states black people could only survive by "knowing their place"; in the North, Black people expected fair treatment. In broader writings on revolution, this has been referred to as the Tocqueville effect or paradox. This criticism also seems to ignore that there were serious/major riots in southern cities like Tampa, Houston, and Jackson and that the Black populations in northern cities like Detroit were larger than the entire populations of most southern towns and cities. As for why there was no rioting in the 1930s, this was a time of such economic deprivation for so many people of every race, that had there been rioting, it would have likely been of a class nature rather than of a racial nature.

== Commission and advisory panel members ==
=== Commission ===
- Otto Kerner, Governor of Illinois and chairman
- John Lindsay, Mayor of New York and vice chairman
- Edward Brooke, Senator (R-MA)
- Fred R. Harris, Senator (D-OK)
- James Corman, Congressman (D-CA)
- William McCulloch, Congressman (R-OH)
- Charles Thornton, Founder of defense contractor Litton Industries
- Roy Wilkins, executive director of the NAACP
- I.W. Abel, President of United Steelworkers of America
- Herbert Turner Jenkins, Police chief, Atlanta, Georgia
- Katherine Graham Peden, Commissioner of Commerce, Kentucky
- David Ginsburg, Commission Executive Director appointed by President Johnson

=== Advisory panels ===
==== Hughes Panel ====
- Richard J. Hughes, chairman
- William Scranton, vice chairman
- Frank L. Farrell
- A. Addison Roberts
- George S. Harris
- Walter Washington
- Frank M. Wozencraft

==== Advisory Panel on Private Enterprise ====
- Charles Thornton, chairman
- John Leland Atwood
- Walter E. Hoadley
- Martin R. Gainsbrugh
- Louis F. Polk Jr.
- Lawrence M. Stone

== See also ==
- List of ethnic riots in the United States
- List of incidents of civil unrest in the United States
- Mass racial violence in the United States
- Racism against African Americans
- Racism in the United States
- Moynihan Report
- President's Commission on Campus Unrest (Scranton Commission)
- Investigation of the Watts Riots by the McCone Commission
- Educational inequality in Southeast Michigan
- Cleveland: Now!
