= List of Walker, Texas Ranger episodes =

The following is a list of episodes from the American television series Walker, Texas Ranger. A total of 203 episodes aired from April 21, 1993, to May 19, 2001.

The original broadcast of the series had the first four episodes that aired at the end of the 1992–1993 television season as season 1, and subsequently identified the remaining seasons as 2–9. The DVDs combine the first two seasons as season 1, not distinguishing the first four episodes as a separate season.

== Series overview ==
Season	Episodes	Originally released	
Season	Episodes	First released	Last released
1	4	April 21, 1993	May 1, 1993
2	24	September 25, 1993	May 21, 1994
3	25	September 24, 1994	May 13, 1995
4	26	September 23, 1995	May 18, 1996
5	27	September 21, 1996	May 17, 1997
6	25	September 27, 1997	May 16, 1998
7	23	September 26, 1998	May 22, 1999
8	25	September 25, 1999	May 20, 2000
9	24	October 7, 2000	May 19, 2001
Television film		October 16, 2005	

== Episodes ==
=== Season 1 (1993) ===
- This season was produced by Cannon Pictures, in the wake of Chuck Norris's film Hellbound (which would not be released for another year); Cannon was bought by MGM shortly thereafter.
- The first season was originally planned to have 13 episodes. Funding abruptly ended when Cannon suffered financial trouble, causing the season to be cut short.

No. overall	No. in season	Title	Directed by	Written by	Original release date	Prod. code	Viewers (millions)
1	1	"One Riot, One Ranger"	Virgil W. Vogel	Leigh Chapman as "Louise McCarn"	April 21, 1993	101	24.4
2	2	"One Riot, One Ranger"	Virgil W. Vogel	Leigh Chapman as "Louise McCarn"	April 21, 1993	101	24.4
Cordell Walker (Chuck Norris) is a contemporary Texas Ranger who believes in dealing with criminals the old-fashioned way: by beating them up and/or gunning them down. During a bank robbery in Fort Worth, Walker's partner Bob Mobley (Steven Ruge) is killed. It doesn't help that Walker's new partner, Ranger James Trivette (Clarence Gilyard), has a history with one of the robbery suspects. Ultimately, Walker discovers that the heist was a practice run for the simultaneous robbing of four banks...which all happen to be next door to each other. After a bank across town receives a valuable shipment, that bank is bombed but not robbed. Walker alone sees through the diversion and is pitted against the heist's mastermind: former Central Intelligence Agent Orson Wade (Marshall Teague). When not on said case, Walker helps three circus performers - an acrobat and two Russian jugglers - against a trio of goons who raped the acrobat, and who now want to run them all out of town to avoid charges. Antagonists: Orson Wade - A former CIA agent and skilled sniper who orchestrated a series of robberies in the Dalla/Ft. Worth area and was solely responsible for killing Walker's partner, Bob Mobley.; Unnamed goons - A trio of criminals who gang-rape an acrobat and then try to intimidate her and the jugglers who stopped them into leaving town.; Notes: The role of C.D. Parker was played by Gailard Sartain. Said character would not be seen again until the first episode of the second season, when Noble Willingham took over the role.; Clarence Gilyard welcomed the role of Jimmy Trivette right after departing his role on Matlock.; In syndication, this is a two-part episode.; Marshall Teague would return for five more episodes of WTR ("Payback" in 1994, "Codename: Dragonfly" in 1996, "Last of a Breed" in 1997, "Fight or Die" in 1999, and the series finale in 2001)...never portraying the same character twice.
3	3	"Borderline"	Michael Vejar	Robin Madden	April 24, 1993	102	17.1
While Tarrant County Assistant D.A. Alex Cahill is prosecuting cop killer Benny Carl Devlin (Ray Lykins), she gets a veiled threat from former Cuervo County sheriff Dewey Baker (Leon Rippy) – the first person she ever put away, because of his excessive police brutality against suspects; he also terrorized anyone who complained about it. But Alex has no proof that Baker is the man who now stalks her, since Baker is having his former cellmate Duane Hopkins (Mark Walters) stalk Alex for him. Walker urges Alex to go into hiding until the smoke settled, but Alex refused, knowing her absence would lead to Devlin being exonerated. Baker even kills Alex's horse, Amber. Then Baker kills Hopkins, whom he doesn't need anymore. Walker and Trivette spring into action when Baker abducts Alex and takes her to a remote cabin (not content with simply killing her outright). Antagonist: Dewey Baker - A former corrupt Sheriff from Cuervo County who sought revenge against Alex after she had him convicted. Note: Leon Rippy would return to WTR for the 1997 episode "Days Past", and for the series finale in 2001, portraying a different role each time.
4	4	"A Shadow in the Night"	Alexander Singer	J. Michael Straczynski	May 1, 1993	103	16.9
In Tokyo, powerful yakuza director Mitsua Usagi (Danny Kamekona) is murdered by Karl Jaeker (John S. Davies) - the personal assistant of Congressman Leo Cabe (Andrew Robinson of Dirty Harry fame). The yakuza pursue Cabe, whom Walker and Trivette are sent to protect; the Rangers soon wonder, however, if there's something Cabe isn't telling them. Meanwhile, Walker is reunited with his old friend Yoshihito "Yoshi" Sakai (Aki Aleong), whose father was a master of Sakai-Ryu karate; Walker was one of the elder Sakai's students. Walker discovers that Yoshi has joined the yakuza...from whom Cabe and Karl have stolen some priceless Japanese artwork, in addition to slaying Usagi-san. Jaeker is captured and tortured by the yakuza, then killed by Yoshi. Antagonist: Leo Cabe - A corrupt Congressman who stole art from the yakuza and whose personal assistant, Karl Jaeker, ended up murdering a powerful yakuza boss.

=== Season 2 (1993–94) ===
- This is the first season to be produced by Chuck Norris's own company, Top Kick Productions.

No. overall	No. in season	Title	Directed by	Written by	Original release date	Prod. code	Viewers (millions)
5	1	"Bounty"	Vern Gillum	Frank Lupo	September 25, 1993	104	19.2
Bank robber Roy Buchanan is accidentally arrested, and then liberated. Now he has not only Walker and Trivette on his heels, but also homicidal bounty hunter Boone Waxwell (Bruce McGill). Walker races to prevent Waxwell from murdering Roy's brother Ned, who has unwittingly gotten involved. Antagonist: Boone Waxwell - A murderous bounty hunter from Oklahoma who is on the payroll of a corrupt sheriff, intending to kill the Buchanan Boys. Notes: This is the first episode where the closing credits are comprised by the still image of a Texas Ranger badge against a blue denim background; they will stay like this for the rest of WTR's run.; Noble Willingham, who previously co-starred with Bruce McGill in 1991's The Last Boy Scout, debuts as C.D. Parker.
6	2	"Storm Warning"	James Darren	Story by : Leigh Chapman (as "Louise McCarn"); Teleplay by : Leigh Chapman (as "Louise McCarn") & Terry Grief	October 2, 1993	105	16.3
Trivette is up the river—and in very hot water—when he goes undercover in prison. He finds himself trapped with other convicts during a brutal escape attempt, while a hurricane is going on. Now Walker must find Trivette before he is exposed. Antagonist: Rollins (Richard Norton) - Leader of a prison gang Trivette had infiltrated who took advantage of a massive storm to cover his escape and take people at a hotel hostage. Note: Richard Norton's previous roles include that of Chuck Norris's leading nemesis in The Octagon.
7	3	"In the Name of God"	Michael Preece	Peter Lance & Terry D. Nelson	October 30, 1993	107	18.1
Alex tries to rescue a friend's daughter from a religious cult, but instead becomes another prisoner of the cult's charismatic leader. Antagonist: John Bodie (Frank Luz) - A cultist leader under the alias 'Deacon' who uses his congregation as a cover for gun running and training militias.
8	4	"Crime Wave Dave"	Tony Mordente	Gordon T. Dawson	November 6, 1993	108	17.5
While searching for Billy Clancy (Tom Hodges), an escaped parolee that he helped before, Walker learns that Billy's parole officer Dave Kilmer (R. D. Call) has been forcing Billy to commit crimes. To protect himself, Kilmer abducts Billy's wife Frances (Marsha Dietlein) and son Billy Jr. (West Gibson) and Walker must rescue them before Billy is killed by the corrupt Kilmer. Antagonist: Dave Kilmer - A corrupt parole officer who uses parolees to carry out his criminal enterprise. Note: R. D. Call, who performed the titular villain of the episode, Dave Kilmer, would return several seasons later as another villain: Stan Gorman in "The Soul of Winter" in 1998.
9	5	"End Run"	Michael Vejar	Rick Husky	November 13, 1993	106	15.6
The wedding of Ranger Hoss at the Ranger Office is interrupted by a courthouse breakout of gang leader Axel Tate (Cylk Cozart), during which Trivette subdues the leader of the break-out, who to Trivette's surprise is an attractive woman, Katherine 'Kat' Prather (Troy Beyer), Axel's girlfriend who was planning on leaving the gang life behind along with Axel. While Walker and Trivette transport the unruly Kat to testify in the out-of-state murder trial of Trigger Jenks (Gregory Scott Cummins) a gun smuggler who had in the past murdered a Ranger Captain who mentored Walker, Trivette struggles with his feelings for the dangerous woman who is being hunted by the now freed Axel and his gang which has been taken over by Trigger, who has ordered the reluctant Axel to kill his girlfriend, Kat to keep her from testifying against him. Antagonists: Trigger Jenks - A gun smuggler who was in Huntsville after killing Walker's mentor and is determined to kill the only witness against him, Kat Prather.; Axel Tate - A ruthless gang leader who escaped the courthouse in a prison break. He inherited the gang from his father, only for Trigger to commandeer it after Kat's arrest.
10	6	"Family Matters"	Tony Mordente	Frank Lupo	November 20, 1993	110	20.1
Walker clashes with Agent Escalanti (Marco Rodríguez) & the FBI after he arrests criminal Mickey Flanders (Benjamin Mouton) who feels himself to be above the law because of his sister Lainie Flanders's (Judith Hoag) involvement in the Witness Protection Program and he Trivette and Alex must find a way to ensure a conviction before the FBI sets him free. Meanwhile, Walker befriends a young boy named Archie (Brady Bluhm) after saving him from some bullies. Antagonist: Mickey Flanders - A psychotic criminal who has the protection of the FBI since he and his sister are in Witsec.
11	7	"She'll Do to Ride the River With"	Andrew Stevens	Peter Lance	November 24, 1993	103	13.3
Dr. Victor Slade (Ken Kercheval), a veterinarian investigating the strange deaths of local animals is killed in what appears to be a drunk driving incident, and his daughter Ally (Cali Timmins) teams up with Walker and Trivette to prove otherwise. The three discover that an environmental waste company has been mixing toxic chemicals with waste oil and spraying them on roads in order to make a larger profit, and had Dr. Slade killed when he got too close to their scheme. Meanwhile, Trivette finds himself taking care of a dog named "Old Blue" after he and Walker save it from drowning after the hound was thrown into a lake. Antagonist: Nash - The owner of an environmental waste company who is mixing toxic chemicals and waste oil and polluting the roads with them, and whose men kill a veterinarian who was investigating the deaths of some animals that resulted from the toxic substances.
12	8	"Unfinished Business"	Michael Preece	Harold Apter	November 27, 1993	109	19.3
A renegade vigilante Samuel J. Bodine (Sam J. Jones), a failed Texas Ranger applicant challenges Walker with his attempts to capture several escaped criminals, but he inadvertently endangers innocent civilians in the process. Meanwhile, Evie (Kim Myers), a young woman who works in the Ranger Office falls in love with a man named Tommy Williams, who unbeknownst to her, is actually the renegade vigilante Walker's looking for. Antagonist: Samuel Bodine - A relentless vigilante and former Ranger applicant whose recklessness put civilians at risk, and also kills several criminals releasing on bail. Note: Sam Jones would return as a different villain - "Big Mick" Stanley - for another WTR episode, 1997's "Devil's Turf". Note: This episode includes future pro-wrestler Amhed Johnson.
13	9	"An Innocent Man"	Michael Preece	Charles Holland	December 4, 1993	111	15.5
Before a condemned man's execution, Walker finds new evidence that may clear the man's name. But when the man doesn't want to change his plea, Walker suspects blackmail, and must prove it before the man is put to death. Antagonist: Leon Muncie - A sadistic serial rapist and killer who is blackmailing a death row inmate whom he framed for his crimes into taking the fall by threatening his family, and plans to strike again once the execution goes through.
14	10	"Night of the Gladiator"	William A. Fraker	David H. Balkan	December 11, 1993	112	17.8
Diane, an old flame of Trivette's asks him to help her brother Randy who is involved with an illegal street fighting ring. Walker and Trivette join the gang by posing as street fighters, and Randy learns from them that the opponent he thought he had accidentally killed, actually died from an overdose of morphine. Though he realizes that his boss was responsible, Randy is forced to continue fighting when his boss kidnaps Diane to keep him in line, and Trivette must hold off Randy so Walker can use the opportunity to save Diane and put an end to the fights for good. Antagonists: Wade Cantrell (Tom Atkins) - The host of an underground illegal fighting ring who is known to fix fights and causes the death of one of the contestants to keep his top fighter in his pocket.; Sammy (Jeep Swenson) - Cantrell's right-hand man.
15	11	"Legend of the Running Bear"	Michael Preece	Harold Apter	January 8, 1994	113	15.8
Walker's cousin, David "Little Eagle" Jackson, returns to the reservation after studying medicine to find that many do not like him, including his girlfriend's father (a member of the reservation's tribal council), whose murder he soon witnesses. Walker must clear his cousins' name when he is arrested for the murder by two corrupt FBI agents who framed him for murder of the tribal leader who they killed after he uncovers they conspired with a mining tycoon to steal land belonging to the reservation. Antagonists: Thomas Sanders and Jack Brody - A pair of corrupt FBI agents on the payroll of an oil tycoon who frame Little Eagle for the murder of member of the reservation's tribal council.
16	12	"Something in the Shadows: Part 1"	Tony Mordente	Harold Apter & Gordon T. Dawson	January 15, 1994	114	19.1
Kurt Nypo, a powerful drug dealer, is attempting to get rid of Walker when he starts to get close. Nypo also has Tony Kingston, one of Walker's karate students (and whose mom he is dating), deliver the drugs. Meanwhile, the Rangers are working on locating a rapist at a college that Alex teaches at. Antagonist: Kurt Nypo - A former karate champion-turned-drug smuggler who physically abuses his girlfriend and forces her son to do courier work in peddling drugs.
17	13	"Something in the Shadows: Part 2"	Michael Preece	Harold Apter & Gordon T. Dawson	January 22, 1994	115	19.1
Tony is busted for delivering the drugs, but refuses to come forward to protect his mother. After Nypo puts her in the hospital, Tony attempts to take matters into his own hands, and Walker, who is being held captive must escape and bust Nypo and his drug lord boss. Meanwhile, the Rangers continue their investigation on the college rapist and suspect that a professor that Alex knows might be the rapist. Antagonists: Kurt Nypo - A former karate champion-turned-drug smuggler who physically abuses his girlfriend and forces her son to do courier work in peddling drugs.; Alan Billbon - A college professor who is the college rapist, who attempts to rape women who are alone in the parking lot. His previous actions at another college was the reason he chose to transfer. Attempted to rape Alex in the parking lot, but she held him off long enough for Walker and Trivette to arrive and arrest him. Prior to being Billbon being confirmed, Peter Needham, who is a professor that Alex befriends was considered as the likely suspect.
18	14	"On Deadly Ground"	Tony Mordente	Rick Husky	January 29, 1994	116	18.7
Walker and Trivette, despite having no jurisdiction, travel to Mexico to rescue a captured DEA agent, who is an old friend of Walker, from a Mexican drug cartel. Antagonist: Emilio Durazo (Yul Vazquez) - A ruthless Cartel boss who ordered the kidnapping of DEA agent Paco Cruz, who had infiltrated his cartel. Note: Carmen Argenziano, who plays D.E.A.'s agent, Paco Cruz, returns several seasons later as the villain of "Iceman" in 1997, George Vickers.
19	15	"Right Man, Wrong Time"	Michael Preece	Chris Bunch & Allan Cole	February 5, 1994	117	18.8
Country singer Merrilee Summers (Mary Elizabeth McGlynn) needs Walker's protection from her estranged music producer ex-husband Waylon Hampton (Wings Hauser), who is stalking and threatening her. Antagonist: Wayland Hampton - A former country singer and music producer who is determined to get his ex-wife and stepdaughter back in his life, even at the cost of her career.
20	16	"The Prodigal Son"	Tony Mordente	Peter Lance	March 5, 1994	118	19.8
Walker does some soul searching after he nearly causes a young man's death during a hostage situation. He ends up helping another young man (Tobey Maguire), who is on the run for stealing drugs from a mob boss to impress his estranged father. Antagonist: Paul Mancini - A New York mafia boss who ran a butcher shop as a front for his drug operations, and chases after Danny Parsons, who helped to steal a key of his cocaine, assuming it was steaks.
21	17	"The Committee"	Michael Preece	Lawrence Hertzog	March 12, 1994	119	15.1
Walker is asked by Alex and an old Justice Department colleague of hers to go undercover and infiltrate the committee: a secret group of dirty law officials (cops, lawyers, and a judge) who use vigilante style tactics to kill criminals released due to legal procedures. To get in, he is forced to display a harsher attitude and put his career and life on the line to bust them. To top it off, one of their members, a public defender who Walker befriends, is marked as a target when she has second thoughts about the committee's actions, which puts them at risk of being exposed. Antagonists: James Riley (Mitchell Ryan)- A judge and the mastermind of the Committee, a shadow group of judges, cops, and lawyers who are targeting and killing criminals who beat the system due to legal technicalities. Uses a digital audio system with prerecorded messages that are transmitted for him to disguise his role as the group's leader.; Officer Strangis (Marco St. John) - A Dallas P.D. officer, Riley's top enforcer and member of the Committee who handles the assassinations for the group. After being ordered to kill Lisa, he was defeated and arrested by Walker.; Lisa Dutton (Kim Johnston Ulrich) - A Public Defender who joined the Committee after becoming disillusioned by the system. Later betrayed and targeted by the Committee when her questioning their actions threatens their existence being made public. Saved by Walker from Strangis, and during the arrest of the Committee, she too is arrested and sentenced for her earlier involvement.
22	18	"Deadly Vision"	Lee H. Katzin	B.G. Henry	March 26, 1994	121	17.8
Using a psychic to help locate a kidnapped 8-year-old girl earns Trivette ridicule from his fellow Rangers, except from Walker and C.D. who support his decision, but will it pay off? Antagonist: Norval Hayes - A psychopathic pedophile and child murderer who kidnapped an 8-year-old girl. Note: This is Floyd Westerman's last appearance on the series, although he would still be credited as Uncle Ray for the remainder of the season.
23	19	"Skyjacked"	Tony Mordente	Gregory S. Dinallo	April 2, 1994	120	15.4
Convicted cop-killer Lyle Guthrie (Patrick Kilpatrick) becomes the center of a jurisdictional dispute between Texas and Ohio when he is sentenced to death in both states-- Texas for the execution-style killing of a Texas Ranger (who was a very close friend of Walker, and whose three children Walker is the godfather of), and Ohio for luring three Cleveland police officers to their deaths with a false 911 call. Just before Guthrie could be executed in Ohio's electric chair, the Supreme Court awards Texas the right to carry out the sentence at the very last moment, at which point Walker and Trivette are assigned to extradite Guthrie back into Texas for sentencing. However, en route, Guthrie tries to escape custody when his friends and younger sister (Ely Pouget) hijack the plane and subdue Walker and Trivette, who must find a way to prevent his escape. Antagonists: Lyle Guthrie (Patrick Kilpatrick) - A death row inmate and cop killer who hijacked a plane with another crew in order to secure his escape, while also injuring one of the passengers. Upon conviction for his crimes, a legal battle between Ohio and Texas ensued, as both states wanted the honor of executing him-- Ohio for the murders of three Cleveland police officers, and Texas for the murder of Ranger Barrett. Because Ranger Barrett was the first victim overall, the Supreme Court ultimately ruled in favor of Texas.; Rhonda Guthrie (Ely Pouget) - Lyle's younger sister and lieutenant. She infiltrated the flight as a flight attendant after she had the flight attendant who was originally scheduled murdered alongside her husband. Her job was to disable the Rangers with sleeping drugs in their drinks, unaware that Walker was moved to another seat.
24	20	"The Long Haul"	Tony Mordente	Gordon T. Dawson	April 9, 1994	122	19.1
Walker and Trivette go undercover to try to catch a gang of big rig hijackers. Antagonist: Frank Slattery - The ringleader behind a crew of big rig hijackers who steals trucks by disguising themselves as police officers. Note: An unbilled Debbie Barker portrays Callie, the lovely-but-shady truck-stop waitress.
25	21	"Rampage"	Tony Mordente	Gregory S. Dinallo	April 30, 1994	124	17.1
C.D. must rescue Walker and Trivette when they are trapped deep inside rural Texas while tracking a band of law-breaking brothers. Antagonist: Troy Cochran - A ruthless gang leader and patriarch of the Cochrans in the gun smuggling game, who threaten witnesses and kidnap a girl to prevent her from testifying in court. Notes: Efrain Figueroa who portrays the gun smuggler Farkas later appears in a different role as Walker's ally Jesse Rodriguez in Season 3 and 4's Standoff, Evil in the Night, and El Coyote.; Lindsey Ginter, who portrayed Troy Cochran, later portrayed another villain several seasons later in "Code of the West"
26	22	"The Reunion: Parts 1 & 2"	Michael Preece	Donald G. Thompson	May 14, 1994	123	15.4
27	23	"The Reunion: Parts 1 & 2"	Michael Preece	Donald G. Thompson	May 14, 1994	123	15.4
Walker and Trivette get help from a legendary Texas Ranger, back to seek justice for his murdered son, in tracking down an assassin with a U.S. Senator in his sights. Antagonist: Shelby Valentine (Jonathan Banks) - Leader of a black op outfit posing as a KCPD detective while plotting to assassinate a U.S. Senator. (Note: In syndication, this is a two-part episode.) *Walker Texas Ranger 3: Deadly Reunion
28	24	"Stolen Lullaby"	Michael Preece	Julie Friedgen	May 21, 1994	125	18.8
Walker investigates the claim of a woman Laurie Maston (Danica McKellar) whose baby has been kidnapped, that the baby has been seen in the possession of a politician. The investigation leads to a baby broker agency who has been stealing babies and conducting illegal adoptions for profit. Antagonists: Garrett Carlson (Ray Wise) - An overly-ambitious mayoral candidate who illegally adopts a stolen baby and does everything possible to cover it up, including threatening to have Walker and Trivette fired to prevent them from getting too close to the truth.; Reid Stedler (Gregg Henry) - A corrupt adoption broker and Carlson's partner known for kidnapping infants from at-risk mothers and selling them to wealthy clients with the aid of his two subordinates who handle the kidnappings. Also attempted to silence Laurie, initially through blackmail, and later almost killed her and Walker by attempting to send them off the roof of a hotel.; Note: Danica McKellar previously co-starred as Jonathan Brandis's girlfriend in the 1992 Chuck Norris vehicle Sidekicks.

=== Season 3 (1994–95) ===
No. overall	No. in season	Title	Directed by	Written by	Original release date	Prod. code	Viewers (millions)
29	1	"Badge of Honor"	Michael Preece	Leonard Katzman	September 24, 1994	201	17.2
Trivette meets Beau Langley (Geoffrey Lewis), an old acquaintance of Walker, who is a sheriff in a small town and runs it with an iron fist and promotes racism among his deputies. When he gets too close to exposing Langley, Trivette is captured, and learns that with a young teenage boy who threatened to expose the sheriff after being racially mistreated, he is to be put to death in a secret location where the remains of other captured prisoners are. With time running out, Walker must find a way to get someone to reveal what is going on, rescue Trivette and the boy, and put an end to the sheriff's racial tyranny. Antagonist: Beau Langley (Geoffrey Lewis) - a former Texas Ranger-turned-small town sheriff whose idea of law and order consists of Sundown-style laws while keeping people of color out of his town.
30	2	"Branded"	Jerry Jameson	Calvin Clements Jr.	October 1, 1994	202	15.7
After cattle inspector Bill Cox is killed by rustlers, Walker and Trivette work with the inspector's deputy to find those responsible, but the rustlers seem to be one step ahead of the Rangers. Walker suspects a mole, and must find a way to uncover it before the rustlers' trail gets cold. Antagonist: Virgil Enders (Scott Plank) - A corrupt deputy cattle inspector and leader of a cattle-rustling gang responsible for killing his employer, which was not expected or intended as he had correctly suspected his connection to the gang.
31	3	"Silk Dreams"	Michael Preece	Mitchell Wayne Katzman	October 8, 1994	204	17.0
A deadly new designer drug sends Walker and Trivette out into the nightlife to seek its source. Meanwhile, Alex is having a recurring nightmare of Walker being shot, which is connected with this case. Antagonist: Frank Swain (Barry Jenner) - The creator and distributor of a dangerous yet pricy drug called Silk.
32	4	"Mustangs"	Tony Mordente	Gordon T. Dawson	October 15, 1994	206	16.6
The death of a man who tried to bring Alex information on a plot to exterminate a group of wild mustangs leads Walker to a local ranch run by two brothers, Ned (James Morrison) and Mitch Travis (Matthew Glave). The elder brother Ned, who is responsible is intending to get out of a lease agreement by getting rid of the herd (although Mitch is unaware of the murder). But when Walker gets too close, Ned and his gang are able to trap him in the badlands with no means of communication. Now, Walker must ride with the leader of the herd in order to turn the tables on them in time. Antagonists: Ned Travis (James Morrison) - A rancher who intended to start a development project that also includes the killing of some mustangs that live in the area which are part of a lease agreement for their ranch that their late father had set up; Ned did not hesitate to kill a landowner or anyone else who had discovered the scheme. His younger brother, Mitch (Matthew Glave) on the other hand, who was having second thoughts about the plan, reforms and turns against his brother when he learned about the murder and his brother's attempt to kill the Rangers and another rancher. By the end of the episode, Mitch agrees to testify against Ned and run the Travis ranch as their father would had wanted.; Corbin (Woody Watson) - Ned's lieutenant who is responsible for the death of the rancher who found out about the plot, and later attempted to kill Walker when he got too close.
33	5	"Til Death Do Us Part"	Alexander Singer	Story by : Channing Clarkson & Sheree J. Wilson; Teleplay by : Channing Clarkson	October 22, 1994	211	18.6
Walker winds up in a coma after trying to save a child from a car that teetered off a bridge following a hit-and-run crash. As Trivette and C.D. search for the culprits responsible, they and Alex reminisce about their individual histories with Walker as they pray for his recovery. Antagonists: Cody (Sam Williamson) and Toby Harris - Two spoiled, rich brothers who are responsible for a reckless joyride that caused a massive car accident which landed Walker in a coma after saving a child.; Larry Harris (Larry Means) - The Harris brothers' father who is revealed to have enabled their behavior by always using his high-powered lawyers and connections to get their charges dropped, even from a past vehicular manslaughter arrest.
34	6	"Rainbow Warrior"	Jerry Jameson	Larry Brody	November 5, 1994	209	17.3
While attending the funeral of Chief Six Feathers, Walker learns that his death was not an accident, as he refused to turn over Cherokee land to a land developing company and his son and Walker's blood brother Billy Gray Wolf (August Schellenberg) is launching an act of vengeance against the man within the company who is responsible, and Walker must stop him before Billy goes too far, while Trivette looks into finding evidence to prove that Chief Six Feathers was murdered. Antagonist: Tate Bodie (Frederick Coffin) - A shady land developer who is responsible for killing a Cherokee Chieftain after the latter had refused to sell him his land.
35	7	"The Road to Black Bayou"	Michael Preece	Story by : David Thoreau; Teleplay by : David Thoreau & Calvin Clements Jr.	November 19, 1994	205-A	18.4
36	8	"The Road to Black Bayou"	Michael Preece	Story by : David Thoreau; Teleplay by : David Thoreau & Calvin Clements Jr.	November 19, 1994	205-B	18.4
Work-related stress builds so Walker, under doctor's advice, takes Trivette and C.D. to Cajun country for a fishing trip. But the vacation turns sour when local ruffians grow tired of the Rangers' presence and take desperate measures to conceal their drug trade. Antagonist: Ferris Clayton (David Huddleston) - The elderly leader of a drug running operation in Louisiana's Bayou, who tries to hide the drug shipment due to presence of Walker, Trivette, and C.D. on vacation. Note: At the end of the second part, Alex, Trivette and C.D. gift Walker a new gun, a Taurus PT92, to replace his old Smith & Wesson Model 29 revolver that was destroyed in "Rainbow Warrior". Note: In syndication, this is a two-part episode.
37	9	"Line of Fire"	Tony Mordente	Rick Husky	November 26, 1994	203	19.1
After receiving information about Dallas police officers dealing in drugs seized from a recent bust, Alex receives a threat on her life. Walker and Trivette suspect that the assassination attempt is from a result of career criminal Mitchell Cutter (John Calvin), whom Alex has been struggling to prosecute, and who also seems to be linked to the corrupt cops and stolen narcotics. They must prove it before Cutter can make another attempt to kill Alex. Antagonist: Mitchell Cutter (John Calvin) - A drug trafficker with dirty cops assisting him in his operations, among them Hank Fargo, as well as the murder of police officer J.C. Rooks and the attempted murder of Alex.
38	10	"Payback"	Alexander Singer	Gordon T. Dawson	December 10, 1994	210	18.7
Corrupt banker Harper Ridland puts out a hit on Walker, already busy trying to locate a stolen van that is designed for a handicapped boy, as revenge for Walker killing his nephew, who was one of the men assigned to steal the special van. Antagonist: Harper Ridland (Marshall R. Teague) - A wealthy real estate developer trained in the Eastern Arts seeking payback against Walker for causing the death of his nephew during a carjacking.
39	11	"Tiger's Eye"	Tony Mordente	Nicholas J. Corea	December 17, 1994	214	18.7
The Japanese yakuza kidnap the daughter of Jesse Morell, a Texas power broker in order to get revenge on his security chief Manzo Tokada. Tokada, a former Japanese cop, previously infiltrated their gang before faking his death with Jesse's help after his cover was blown. However, Tokada refuses Walker's assistance, preferring to handle the task his way. Antagonist: Tiger (James Lew) - A yakuza who kidnaps a power broker's daughter just to draw out Tokada.
40	12	"The Big Bingo Bamboozle"	Michael Preece	Robert Wynne	January 7, 1995	222	16.9
A protected witness to a bingo game (that was actually a money laundering operation) keeps trying to escape protective custody. Walker must uncover the truth before they miss the trial that will incarcerate Ricky Ricketts (Robert Forster), the mastermind of the operation. Antagonist: Richard "Ricky" Ricketts (Robert Forster) - A money launderer whom Walker and Trivette have failed to arrest in the past and uses Bingo games to hide dirty money. Notes: This episode marks the debut of the show's theme song "Eyes of a Ranger", sung by Chuck Norris, which first appears in the opening and closing credits.; Robert Forster previously portrayed Chuck Norris's leading nemesis in 1986's The Delta Force; Forster would return, as a different villain, in 1997 for "Texas vs. Cahill".
41	13	"Money Train"	Christian I. Nyby II	Rick Husky	January 14, 1995	218	17.3
Walker and Trivette chance upon a planned train robbery after Trivette gets the pair work on a movie set. Antagonist: Cody Preston - A stunt performer who is the ringleader of a crew planning a train heist.
42	14	"Mean Streets"	Michael Preece	Mitchell Wayne Katzman	January 28, 1995	212	17.9
A masked group consisting of spoiled rich boys have chosen to clean up the streets their way by beating up the homeless and filming their attacks. But when one of their attacks results in a homicide, Walker goes undercover as a homeless man to catch them before they can destroy a homeless shelter and kill a witness to the crime. Antagonists: Pete Battle (John Terlesky) - A wealthy, spoiled boy who is leading a crew of goons to assault homeless people, killing one, and film the attacks; though it is just for the amusement of the other guys, this is more of a personal issue for him due to his father constantly donating what he feels is his inheritance to a homeless shelter, and also has no qualms about threatening to kill his friend Alan Talast who videotaped the attacks, due to Alan having second thoughts after the murder and wanting to back out.; Dan (Travis Davis) and Jason (Todd Terry) - Pete's friends and accomplices.
43	15	"Cowboy"	Christian I. Nyby II	Richard Stanley	February 4, 1995	219	21.2
Alex gets caught at the scene of an oil tycoon's abduction by career criminal Victor LaRue (Wayne Péré) and is rounded up as a hostage herself. Walker and Trivette set out to track down LaRue and save her and the other hostages before LaRue kills them all. Antagonist: Victor LaRue - A sadistic kidnapper who abducts Alex, a wealthy oil tycoon, and several others, while plotting a ransom whom he intends to kill regardless if the ransom was paid.
44	16	"War Zone"	Michael Preece	Gordon T. Dawson	February 11, 1995	220	20.7
45	17	"War Zone"	Michael Preece	Gordon T. Dawson	February 11, 1995	221	20.7
A series of high-profile robberies by men in clown masks puzzle the Rangers, but when one results in the murder of Logan Reno (Buck Taylor), Walker's ex-partner, it becomes a personal crusade. Walker and Trivette suspect that an employee of an armored car company, Clete Gibson, was present during these thefts and may be working with the robbers, whom the Rangers discover are ex-military, while Walker works to help Logan's two orphaned children— a rebellious teenage son (Ian Bohen) and a State Trooper daughter (Susan Diol) who wants to get involved in the case— cope with their loss, given that Logan's wife, Molly, passed away a few years prior. Antagonists: Mitchell Bolton (Tim Thomerson) - An ex-Navy SEAL and ringleader of a heist crew dressed as clowns hitting a series of armored trucks, leading to the murder of Walker's former partner, Logan Reno.; Burt Mueller (Wilford Brimley) - A bank owner whose armored trucks were hit by Bolton and his team, and is later discovered to be in league with Bolton.; (Note: In syndication, this is a two-part episode.)
46	18	"Trust No One"	Tony Mordente	Teleplay by : Terry D. Nelson & Rick Kelbaugh; Story by : Fred McKnight	February 18, 1995	228	18.6
Walker must clear the name of Trivette, who has been accused in the disappearance of $5 million in counterfeit money. Antagonists: Lyle (Robert Culp), Buford Pike (Dirk Blocker), Stacy (Crystal Chappell) - The counterfeiters who framed Trivette for the embezzlement of five million dollars in counterfeit money and the murder of a pilot who was associated with them.
47	19	"Blue Movies"	Michael Preece	Calvin Clements Jr.	February 25, 1995	213	17.8
A judge is killed during a secret meeting with Alex and Walker, by a man who reveals to Walker that the one who ordered the hit is D.L. Dade (Howard Keel), a respectable businessman who has been keeping his true activities hidden from the law. Alex and Walker are forced to make a deal with the judge's killer in order to get his testimony to convict Dade. But after the killer himself is murdered to keep him from testifying, Walker remembering that the man said that Dade once made adult films, decides to track down one of the actresses a girl known by the stage name, "Candy Delight" suspecting that she was underage at the time. However, an informant in Alex's office is keeping Dade up to date on the Rangers' moves. Walker finds the actress is now a married woman with a husband and two young children, who is unwilling to testify about her background. Not wanting to ruin the woman's happy life, Walker chooses against convincing her to testify, but Dade is determined to get rid of witnesses, and Walker must save her from being killed by Dade's hitmen. Antagonists: D.L. Dade (Howard Keel) - A local businessman who is secretly a crime figure involved in a number of illegal activities, including connections with a former filmmaker with an underage actress. Dade ordered the murder of Judge Radford to prevent his dealings from being revealed. After he has Sonny Lyle killed, the Rangers agree to focus on his pornography business as a last resort to convict him for his crimes.; Todd (John McCalmont) - Alex's law clerk who secretly is an informant for Dade in exchange for a payoff, and is later charged with his betrayal.; Sonny Lyle (Sherman Howard) - A hitman hired by Dade to assassinate Judge Radford to prevent his dealings from being revealed. Dade later kills him, too, to keep him from testifying.; Notes: This is Howard Keel's final television performance.; Sherman Howard appears again two seasons later as a neurotic businessman named Mr. Burrows in "Mayday".
48	20	"On Sacred Ground"	Joe Coppoletta	Gordon T. Dawson	March 11, 1995	231	16.6
Walker investigates when Cherokee youths led by Tommy Bright Hawk, the son of Billy Gray Wolf (from the earlier Season 3 episode "Rainbow Warrior") steals artifacts from a museum, claiming they were illegally taken from their ancestral burial grounds. As Billy joins Walker to save Tommy, the two uncover a secret operation of smugglers stealing artifacts from Native American burial grounds that are being sold to museums for profit. Antagonist: Raymond McCumber - A fence working for an Indian artifact theft crew who steals from Indian burial grounds.
49	21	"Case Closed"	Tony Mordente	Steven L. Sears	April 29, 1995	227	19.8
Walker seeks to disprove 40 years of UFO sightings in a small, Texas town, while also trying to find the missing father of a young girl. Antagonist: James Blair (Dirk Benedict) - Leader of a terrorist cell operating near an Air Force Base with the aim of kidnapping a little girl for experiments with laser beams.
50	22	"Flashback"	Tony Mordente	Jim Byrnes	May 6, 1995	226	16.1
51	23	"Flashback"	Tony Mordente	Jim Byrnes	May 6, 1995	226	16.1
Walker and Trivette pursue a group of robbery suspects/killers seeking the lost treasures of Hayes Cooper, a 19th Century Wild West Texas Ranger. During the pursuit, Walker is attacked by a rattlesnake but survives with minimal injuries. Antagonists: Fred Kimble (Martin Kove) - Leader of an armed robbery crew who changed his focus from knocking over a bank to acquiring Hayes Cooper's gold. Parts of the episode are "flashbacks" to Hayes Cooper, who with Lockett (played by Trivette/Gilyard), is pursuing a group of killers. (Notes: In syndication, this is a two-part episode.)
52	24	"Standoff"	Michael Preece	Tom Blomquist and Rick Husky & Terry D. Nelson	May 13, 1995	224	17.7
53	25	"Standoff"	Michael Preece	Tom Blomquist and Rick Husky & Terry D. Nelson	May 13, 1995	225	17.7
Walker (with the aid of a jet pack) and Trivette protect a Mexican Presidential candidate Rafael Mendoza (Gregory Sierra) from a deadly assassin (Robin Sachs). Antagonists: Phillipe Brouchard (Robin Sachs) - An international hitman and master of disguise hired by a Cartel boss Ernesto Espinoza to kill Presidential candidate Rafael Mendoza.; Unnamed Mercenary (Richard Norton) - Brouchard's second-in-command.; Ernesto Espinoza (Juan Fernandez) - An incarcerated Cartel boss whom Broussard demands be free after taking a bunch of hostage, unaware of Broussard's true intentions for him.; (Note: In syndication, this is a two-part episode.)

=== Season 4 (1995–96) ===
No. overall	No. in season	Title	Directed by	Written by	Original release date	Prod. code	Viewers (millions)
54	1	"Blown Apart"	Tony Mordente	Terry D. Nelson	September 23, 1995	307	19.4
An escaped psychopathic prisoner named Max Kale (Ed O'Ross) goes on a spree, eager to kill people who helped put him away in prison—a list of people including Walker, Alex, a doctor named Jane Pine, a judge named Hollister, Max's ex-wife Angela, and the neighbors from the street where Max was raised. Now Walker must do whatever it takes to protect the people and put an end to Kale's rampage. Antagonist: Max Kale (Ed O'Ross) - A violent and deeply religious bomber who escaped prison and seeks to kill those who had him incarcerated, including his ex-wife Angela, Walker and Alex, through explosives.
55	2	"Deep Cover"	Tony Mordente	Calvin Clements Jr.	September 30, 1995	308	19.5
While on loan to the DEA for a case, Walker and Trivette head to Miami, Florida, where Walker poses as a cocaine dealer to help break up a drug trafficking operation and rescue a cop that is being held hostage. Antagonists: Carlos Darius (Andrew Divoff) - A Miami druglord in the cocaine game who kidnaps an undercover police officer while he has his bodyguard kill her partner.; Felix - Darius's assistant and bodyguard who is very tall and muscular to which his durability makes him a very difficult opponent to fight off. Responsible for killing anyone that crosses his boss.
56	3	"The Guardians"	Michael Preece	John Lansing & Bruce Cervi	October 7, 1995	311	17.5
When an undercover cop winds up dead, Walker goes undercover at an oil rig to locate The Guardians, a group of eco-terrorists that have infiltrated the rig with the intention of blowing it up. Antagonist: Jerry Lee Stark (Steve Railsback) - An eco-terrorist who leads the Guardians on a mission to take out an oil rig in the Gulf Coast.
57	4	"Collision Course"	Chuck Bowman	Jim Byrnes	October 14, 1995	309	18.6
C.D.'s niece (Shannon Fill) is kidnapped by her ex-boyfriend (Brian Krause) who forces her into a string of bank robberies. Walker and C.D.'s pursuit of the pair becomes further complicated when a radio show host "Tumbleweed Tom" (Paul Williams), unaware of what's really going on, offers a bounty on their Bonnie and Clyde-style bank robberies, attracting the attention of people who want to collect this reward, even if it means killing them. Antagonist: Billy Kramer (Brian Krause) - An armed robber who forces his ex-girlfriend to participate in a string of Bonnie and Clyde-style robberies. He also attempted to kill Tumbleweed Tom, after the latter learned the truth from Walker and C.D. and was attempting to convince Billy to surrender. However, this latter action made it easier for Walker to intercept him, resulting in Billy's arrest.
58	5	"Point After"	Joe Coppoletta	Story by : Ronald M. Cohen; Teleplay by : Rick Husky	October 21, 1995	303	19.5
The Rangers' investigation of the murder of an assistant high school football coach leads to their discovery of a blackmail plot towards the team caused by an illegal high-stakes gambling ring and they must end it before the state tournament game the high school team had been preparing for starts. Antagonist: Mace Perkins (Brandon Smith) - A car dealership owner running a gambling racket, who is blackmailing high school football players to lose the championship game, and also orders the murder of the team's coach who had discovered everything.
59	6	"Evil in the Night"	Michael Preece	Tom Blomquist	November 4, 1995	315	20.0
Running Wolf, a malevolent medicine man (Billy Drago) resurrects after the desecration of his burial ground, and Walker must confront his past demons if he hopes to stop the spirit before he gets revenge. Antagonist: Running Wolf (Billy Drago) - The spirit of a deceased Indian shaman whose burial ground is desecrated and who calls up spirits to kill those who have offend the sacred place. Note: Billy Drago previously co-starred in not one but three Chuck Norris films: Invasion U.S.A.; The Hero and the Terror; and Delta Force 2: The Colombian Connection.
60	7	"Final Justice"	Joe Coppoletta	Rick Husky	November 11, 1995	306	21.0
After learning from an aging inmate (William Smith) that one of his parents' killers (John Vernon/Jon Rutherford) was never brought to justice and had faked his death years earlier, Walker finds a witness (Clu Gulager) and goes undercover to locate the culprit. Antagonists: Clint Murdock, formerly Max Slater (played by John Vernon as an elderly adult; played by Jon Rutherford as a young adult) - A white supremacist who murdered Walker's parents in the 60's. He faked his death (after using his brother as his stand in) years after the murders, and is now running a separatist white supremacist militia group in Oklahoma.; Lamar (Marc Alaimo) - A white supremacist who is Murdock's second-in-command.; Ray Murdock (Geoff Meed) - Murdock's son and top enforcer. Also raped a woman Laurie Jamison (Karen Person) who gave birth to a son Zack to whom he wants to raise in their family's beliefs against Laurie's wishes. Laurie's father, Duke (Gulager) was also a witness to Walker's parents' murders.
61	8	"The Lynching"	Michael Preece	Nicholas J. Corea	November 18, 1995	310	20.2
In a small town, a well-liked ranch owner by the name of Wilma Casey (Diane Perella) is murdered and a young mentally disabled man who was living with her (Eric Bruskotter) is accused of murdering her by a lynch mob (who is led by a vengeful father whose son was accidentally killed by the man several years earlier) which demands to settle it with vigilante-style justice. Walker and Trivette must prove his innocence before the mob extracts vengeance. Antagonists: Earl Nelson (Cooper Huckabee) - A hired hand on Wilma Casey's ranch who killed the owner for her coin collection and was willing to let his nephew, Jonah, take the fall for it and later exploited Hewitt's hatred to have him kill Jonah and then take the blame for it.; Jack Hewitt (Cliff Stephens) - A vengeful man who holds a deep grudge against Jonah for accidentally killing his son Billy (after Billy and his friends had drunkenly attacked Jonah), and now looks to use Wilma Casey's murder as an excuse to avenge his son by forming a lynch mob. After he was informed about Jonah's secret location, Walker helps Hewitt realize he was being used as a scapegoat to which he identifies Nelson, before he and his two friends Jackson and Webber were arrested for their role in causing the riot.; Note: Eric Bruskotter, who plays Jonah Nelson in this episode, plays another character one season later in "Devil's Turf": Joey O'Bannon.
62	9	"Whitewater: Part 1"	Michael Preece	Lou & Liz Comici	November 25, 1995	304-A	20.6
Alex and Walker's whitewater rafting trip becomes a working vacation when one of the rafters is murdered. Meanwhile, Trivette and CD pursue an escaped convict...who's headed down-river in the same direction as Alex and Walker. Antagonist: Garland Briscoe - An escaped convict who takes Alex hostage while she was on holiday with Walker and other tourists in their group in order to get past the Ranger Station. Note: Parts 1 and 2 are shown as a single episode on the DVD release.
63	10	"Whitewater: Part 2"	Michael Preece	Lou & Liz Comici	December 2, 1995	304-B	22.1
See Part 1 above. Note: Parts 1 and 2 are shown as a single episode on the DVD release.
64	11	"The Covenant"	Tony Mordente	Teleplay by : Donald G. Thompson & Gordon Dawson; Story by : Donald G. Thompson	December 9, 1995	301	22.1
A gang leader (Demetrius Navarro) who is trying to start a turf war attempts to recruit one of Walker's karate students, Tommy Lopez (Boris Cabrera), to his side. When Tommy refuses, the gang severely wounds his older brother Ernesto (Julio Cedillo), a former member of theirs who was taken out of the gang lifestyle by Walker, in a drive-by shooting and frames a rival gang who they had shot just moments previously for it, and Walker must stop the rival gang from retaliating and igniting the turf war, as well as prevent Tommy, who decides to join Ernesto's old gang to get retribution for his brother's shooting (not knowing that they are actually responsible for it), from throwing his life away in an act of misguided vengeance. Antagonist: Sonny "The Viper" Portillo (Demetrius Navarro) - Leader of the Vatos Locos gang and a violent gangbanger from Ernesto's past who is determined to bring his younger brother Tommy into his gang and involve him in the war with a rival gang.
65	12	"Rodeo"	Michael Preece	Babs Greyhosky	January 6, 1996	314	19.2
Victor DeMarco (Joseph Campanella), a mob boss who was put away in prison years ago, is given a new trial and intends to go free by using false witnesses. After his men kill two of the real witnesses, Walker and Trivette go undercover to protect the final witness, a rodeo rider who is an ex-boyfriend of Alex and a friend of Walker after he refuses protective custody. Antagonists: Victor DeMarco (Joseph Campanella) - A mob boss determined to get out from prison by killing off all the witnesses against him, including Alex's ex-boyfriend.; Patty Watson (Monique Parent) - A female enforcer under the guise of a barrel racer hired by DeMarco to kill Alex's former flame.
66	13	"Flashpoint"	Aaron Norris	John Lansing & Bruce Cervi	January 13, 1996	318	18.7
The IRA targets one of their own - Adam McGuire (Michael Beck), who now pleads for peace in Northern Ireland - for assassination. Instead the militants' leader is captured, and his son plots to free him. Antagonists: Gavin Malloy (Paul Jenkins) - An IRA leader and former comrade-in-arms of Adam McGuire, who intends to organize an assassination on McGuire himself to prevent peace in Northern Ireland.; Derek Malloy (Billy Jayne) - Gavin Malloy's son and an IRA terrorist leading a hit crew in taking out Adam McGuire, a former member who seeking peace for Northern Ireland.; Notes: This episode serves as a backstory for Season 7's "Second Chance".; Shortly after this episode was completed, Michael Beck co-starred in Chuck Norris's movie Forest Warrior, which was filmed in Oregon over a two-month period and then released directly to DVD eight months later.; Billy Jayne, who portrays Derek Malloy, is the older brother of Bobby Jacoby, who would go on to play undercover rookie Ranger Danny O'Bannon one season later in "Devil's Turf".
67	14	"Break In"	Joe Coppoletta	Jim Byrnes	January 20, 1996	317	21.1
Walker and Trivette go undercover in a prison as a convict and a guard respectively to gather evidence on a convicted racketeer (Anthony Zerbe) that had a key witness and two rangers murdered, but are unaware that the assistant warden and some of the guards are working for the felon. On top of all that, Trivette gets exposed, forcing Walker to work alone and bust the warden before his own cover is blown and the felon walks free. Antagonists: Joey Galloway (Anthony Zerbe) - An incarcerated racketeer who had a key witness and two rangers killed to prevent the former from testifying against him and has the assistant warden and some guards on his payroll. He also had Chaplain Calberry murdered when Walker's cover is blown after attempting to get information from him.; Murphy (Joe Unger) - An incarcerated criminal who is Galloway's lieutenant.; Harold Wells (Sean McGraw) - The assistant warden who is on Galloway's payroll. Though he learns that the hitman whose identity Walker is using is somewhere else, following Chaplain Calberry's murder, he was exposed due to Calberry documenting the information prior to his murder.; Shankley (William Lucking) - The captain of the guards who is on Galloway's payroll.
68	15	"The Return of LaRue"	Michael Preece	Tom Blomquist	February 3, 1996	322	21.9
Paroled on a technicality, Victor LaRue pretends to have changed as he takes revenge on Walker and Alex. Antagonist: Victor LaRue - A kidnapper arrested by Walker a year earlier, who is now paroled and determined to get revenge on him and Alex.
69	16	"The Juggernaut"	Tony Mordente	Calvin Clements Jr.	February 10, 1996	316	22.1
Alex helps an abused wife at a mountain retreat of her women's support group to see that her violent husband can never change, but when he tracks her down to the retreat's location, it places all of them in danger. Antagonist: Brad Furnell (Patrick St. Esprit) - A violent and abusive husband hell-bent on getting his wife back into his life by any means.
70	17	"El Coyote: Part 1"	Tony Mordente	Gordon T. Dawson	February 17, 1996	323-A	21.4
After saving a female Mexican immigrant (Issabela Camil) who was brought in illegally and forced into prostitution, Walker goes undercover with Mexican agent Jesse Rodriguez (from the Season 3 episode "Standoff") as a peasant to track a large operation of slave-labor smugglers in Mexico that are migrating Mexican immigrants into the United States illegally by tricking them with false promises of providing them with a better life. Antagonists: El Coyote (Geno Silva) - A farmer criminal smuggling illegal immigrants into the States with false promises of a better life, only to enslave them with cheap labor.; Fontemuro (Eddie Velez) - A pimp involved in El Coyote's smuggling operation. His capture of Juanita Ortiz (Camil) was what alerted the Rangers and Jesse to the operation.; MP Bates (Art Hindle) - A Human resources contractor and a subordinate of El Coyote and Teri Lansing.; Paul Croton (Michael Wiseman) - A subordinate of Bates who helps run the farm to which Walker and Jesse's group is sent to.; Halifax (Brooks Gardner) - An enforcer of Bates in charge of the farm where Walker and Jesse are taken to.
71	18	"El Coyote: Part 2"	Tony Mordente	Gordon T. Dawson	February 24, 1996	323-B	22.3
While being put to work at a farm, Jesse finds one of their men there to whom he once arrested a long time ago could identify him as a police officer once he remembers him which puts both his and Walker's cover at risk, forcing Walker to take a daring risk by showing his worth in standing up to the slavers to meet the real leader of this slave-labor operation before their cover is blown. Meanwhile, after the female immigrant they saved is recaptured and forced back into prostitution, Trivette leads a manhunt to get her back. Antagonists: El Coyote (Geno Silva) - A farmer criminal smuggling illegal immigrants into the States with false promises of a better life, only to enslave them with cheap labor.; Teri Lansing (Valerie Wildman) - A benefactor running the smuggling operations while hosting underground death fights at her compound.; Fontemuro (Eddie Velez) - A pimp involved in El Coyote's smuggling operation. His capture of Juanita Ortiz was what alerted the Rangers and Jesse to the operation. Though he was ordered by Bates to kill Juanita upon recapturing her, he chose to profit off of her instead, which only allowed for them to be spotted by Dallas PD, enabling Trivette and C.D. to save Juanita and the other girls, with C.D. personally arresting Fontemuro.; MP Bates (Art Hindle) - A Human resources contractor and a subordinate of El Coyote and Teri Lansing.; Paul Croton (Michael Wiseman) - A subordinate of Bates who helps run the farm which Walker and Jesse's group is sent to. Later attempts to interrogate Jesse when his cover is blown, prior to Walker returning after capturing Lansing and saving Jesse alongside Fito. Jesse then forced Croton to provide information on El Coyote's next illegal boarder crossing, allowing him, the Rangers, and Boarder Patrol to set an ambush and arrest El Coyote and Bates.; Halifax (Brooks Gardner) - An enforcer of Bates in charge of the farm where Walker and Jesse are taken to. Later attempts to interrogate Jesse when his cover is blown, prior to Walker returning after capturing Lansing and saving Jesse alongside Fito.; Notes: During this part of the episode, Tony Mordente, who directed the entirety of the plot, makes a guest appearance at the beginning as Immigration and Naturalization Service agent Lou Massucci.
72	19	"The Avenger"	Tony Mordente	Nicholas J. Corea	March 2, 1996	324	20.4
Arms-dealer Randall Hooks (Christopher Dahlberg) is killed by Walker in a raid. Then Randall's elder brother, mercenary Caleb Hooks (Michael Parks), retaliates by killing FBI Agent Phillip Daniels (Michael Costello), who led the fateful bust, then kidnapping Walker and making him fight to the death. As Walker fights to stay alive, Trivette works with Daniels' partner, Agent Carl Bishop (Todd Terry), to locate Walker. Antagonist: Caleb Hooks (Michael Parks) - A mercenary seeking payback against Walker by kidnapping him and putting him through a series of trials after his brother was killed in a sting. Note: Michael Parks previously co-starred as Chuck Norris's partner-turned-nemesis in 1991's The Hitman. He would return, three years later, in Season 7's "No Way Out".
73	20	"Behind the Badge"	Michael Preece	Tom Blomquist	March 23, 1996	326	19.5
Action surrounding Walker stymies Trivette's attempts to impress the female reporter of a "Behind the Badge" documentary show. Antagonist - Eddie "Paradise" Stubenhouse - A wanted fugitive Trivette is tracking which is being documented on a reality show.
74	21	"Blackout"	Joe Coppoletta	Rick Husky	April 6, 1996	325	17.7
A blow to the head leaves Walker with amnesia during an undercover operation to uncover money laundering at a casino, and his only ally is a female spy who must help him recover his memory to bust the scam. Antagonist: Remington Burns - A money launderer that Walker was looking to capture who wounded him in the head, causing temporary amnesia.
75	22	"Deadline"	Tony Mordente	Story by : Nicholas J. Corea & Jeff Myrow; Teleplay by : Nicholas J. Corea	April 13, 1996	328	21.2
A senator proposes to save money by disbanding the Texas Rangers. But when his daughter is kidnapped by a gang of jewelry store robbers, he refuses the Rangers' help, choosing to rely on the F.B.I., although Walker and Trivette have a better chance of locating the kidnappers in time. Antagonists: Lyle Eckert (Robert Englund) - The leader of a jewelry store heist crew responsible for kidnapping Lindsay Hughes, the daughter of State Senator Warren Hughes, to force him to pay the ransom.; Ronnie (Doug Spinuzza) - Eckert's lieutenant, and a member of the jewelry store heist crew.; Troy Winston (Harlan Jordan) - Eckart's foster parent whom Eckart addresses as "Uncle Troy". He allows Eckert and his gang to use his farm as a base, which is also where Lindsay was buried with an air tank. It was only with the help of a retired Juvenile Corrections officer, that Walker was able to locate Winston's farm and narrowly save Lindsay in time when the tank ran out of air.
76	23	"The Siege"	Tony Mordente	Gordon Dawson & Calvin Clements Jr.	April 27, 1996	327	20.6
While on vacation at a friends' house, heroin smugglers lay siege on their house when Alex and their friend's son accidentally stumble on their operation. Matters become complicated when the son is critically wounded and Walker and Trivette's guns start running low on ammunition, forcing Walker to use guerrilla tactics to pick off the attackers. Antagonists: Glen (Lewis Van Bergen) and Chip Larkin (Ashley Wood) - A brother pair of drug traffickers who try to eliminate the Rangers and their friends after Alex and Bobby stumbled onto their dealings. Note: In addition to this episode, Matt Clark returned to the series in the final two episodes of the final series "The Final Showdown: Part 1 & 2", Clark had already appeared in the 1981 Chuck Norris film An Eye for an Eye.
77	24	"The Moscow Connection"	Joe Coppoletta	Nicholas J. Corea & Terry D. Nelson	May 4, 1996	321	19.0
A Russian policeman comes to Texas to help the Texas Ranger deal with Russian criminals that are attempting to take over a local organization from the Italians. Notes: While on a stakeout, Trivette quotes a passage from The Secret Power Within, and Walker asks Trivette for the title of the book. When Trivette tells him, and mentions that it was written by Chuck Norris, Walker gives the impression that he's never heard of Norris (although he does correct Trivette on the number of world karate championships Norris had won). Antagonist: Max Karpov - A Russian gangster plotting a hostile takeover of a series of rackets run by the Salvino Family. Note: This episode shows that Chuck Norris exists in the show's fictional universe.
78	25	"Miracle at Middle Creek"	Michael Preece	Rick Husky	May 11, 1996	332	18.1
While he and C.D. are trailing a group of bank robbers, Walker learns a small boy is trapped underground, unaware that the boy's father was forced to help in the robbery. When Walker finds himself buried alive with the boy, it is up to Trivette to rescue them. Antagonists: Kyle Ganz (James Horan) - The leader of a robbery crew who forced a family man into his schemes, until the latter's son fell into a well, ruining the plans. Later arrested by Trivette when they attempt to kill the father to silence him.; Whit Ganz (Lew Temple) - Kyle's younger brother and lieutenant.
79	26	"Hall of Fame"	Michael Preece	John Lansing & Bruce Cervi	May 18, 1996	331	18.3
A serial killer from C.D.'s past taunts him as he prepares for induction to the Texas Rangers Hall of Fame and Walker and Trivette set out to help C.D. bring him to justice. Antagonist: Adam "The Hangman" Quinn (Lenny von Dohlen) - A serial killer from C.D.'s past known for killing young ladies while photographing them as part of his sick fantasies by hanging them. Features Baboon

=== Season 5 (1996–97) ===
No. overall	No. in season	Title	Directed by	Written by	Original release date	Prod. code	Viewers (millions)
80	1	"Higher Power"	Michael Preece	Bob Gookin	September 21, 1996	403	16.9
Walker and Alex save a Buddhist monk by the name of Master Rin (John Fujioka), a scientist named Susan Lee (Julia Nickson), and her son Davey (Sean Carberry) from some local thugs. They learn that Master Rin is searching for the reincarnation of his former master, Lama Dolgin, whom Rin believes to be Davey (he is later proven correct). When Master Rin is injured while protecting Davey, when they are attacked during Tai Chi practice by a man who believes himself to be the reincarnation of a man named Chang, who Lama Dolgin disgraced when he defeated Chang after the man had challenged him and who Dolgin stopped from committing ritual suicide (he later swore to take revenge on the Lama). The current Chang intends to capture and imprison Dolgin's reincarnation so he may corrupt him (because killing Davey would only result in the young Lama's reincarnation). Walker must fight Chang in order to protect young Davey. Antagonist: Tim Chang - A martial artist who intends to capture the reincarnation of Lama Dolgin as revenge for his past defeat, wanting to kidnap Davey, but instead, kidnapping Susan.
81	2	"Patriot"	Tony Mordente	John Lansing & Bruce Cervi	September 28, 1996	402	17.7
After the leader of a white-supremacist group is arrested for the murder of Trivette's cousin, a United States Army lieutenant (who had discovered that the leader, and his subordinate officer, were stealing weapons from their Army base), the group retaliates by taking over a minority-owned television station and threatens the lives of the hostages (including Alex) if their leader is not released. Kind-hearted reporter Shelly Preston (Lynne Moody) confronts the leader Sergeant Major Bart Hawkins (John Savage) in the studio, but Hawkins punches her and knocks her out cold. As she helplessly lies there, defeated, everyone looks on, waiting for Walker, who is now their last hope, but may have to fight Hawkins to the death, as Hawkins attempts to air a hate message to indoctrinate more people to his cause. Antagonists: Sergeant Major Bart Hawkins (John Savage) - An Army Soldier and White Supremacist, who is the leader of the Freedom Brigade and was responsible for both stealing weapons from the base and for the ordering the hit on Trivette's cousin who caught onto his plot.; Sgt. Brock (Christopher Dahlberg) - An Army Soldier and White Supremacist, who is a high-ranking official of the Freedom Brigade and Sergeant Major Hawkins' subordinate officer. He leads his fellow white supremacists in the take over of a television station, and hold Alex, Shelly and the rest of the staff hostage in order to get the authorities to give into their demands, that they release their leader from custody.
82	3	"Ghost Rider"	Karl Kases	Nicholas J. Corea	October 5, 1996	401	19.99
The spirit of a dead Apache teenage boy assists Walker to discover who murdered him eight years prior. Antagonist: Mitchell "Mitch" Forman - The son of wealthy land developer Delmont Forman who was responsible for killing a teenage Apache boy while institutionalizing his older brother, and indirectly killing his father during an argument by letting him have a heart attack and drown in their swimming pool.
83	4	"The Brotherhood"	Michael Preece	Gordon T. Dawson	October 12, 1996	407	18.48
A group of vigilante cops form the Brookdale Police Department (John Beck, Matthew Tompkins and Jameson Parker) have been targeting and murdering criminals who get off due to technicalities. Meanwhile, Walker helps Ernesto Lopez (who had joined the Marine Corps after recovering from being shot in "The Covenant"), who has been accused of rape and Alex is able to help him uncover DNA evidence that would prove his innocence. Along with the DNA evidence, Ernesto provides an alibi to Walker and Alex that he fell in love with a Congressman's daughter who was recently accepted to Harvard Law School and was seeing her the night of the rape, but didn't come forward about this before to avoid upsetting her father, who wanted her to focus on school. However, before any of this becomes public knowledge, the rogue cops murder Ernesto because they neglected to check that he really was innocent, and it becomes a personal issue for Walker, especially when they attempt to kill Walker before he exposes them after figuring out who they are. Antagonists: Sgt. Lou Ross (John Beck) - The leader of the rogue Brookdale cops killing off criminals who beat the system based on technicalities, and personally kills Ernesto Lopez without realizing that he was truly innocent. He commits suicide after Horne and Foster are killed.; Sgt. Robert "Bob" Horne (Jameson Parker) - a rogue Brookdale cop killing off criminals who beat the system based on technicalities (his brother, Randy Horne, a rookie Dallas cop, was killed and the one responsible was let off on a technicality, which led to Horne killing the suspect in retaliation) and attempts to appease Walker's well-being instincts, without understanding Ernesto Lopez's true innocence in the rape of the girl. Ross accidentally shot him while trying to kill Walker.; Officer Frank Foster (Matthew Tompkins) - a rogue Brookdale cop killing off criminals who beat the system based on technicalities, without believing Ernesto Lopez's true innocence in the rape of the girl. Walker shot him in self-defense during the confrontation at the cemetery close to the funeral home where Ernesto was being prepped for burial.; Frank (Cyril O'Reilly) and Ben Bodine (Scott Valentine) - Brothers and gunrunners who managed to beat the system, only to later be killed by the trio of vigilante cops before they could make their escape to Costa Rica.; Milo Creech (Bill Wise) - A ruthless loan shark who got off on a technicality and the first victim of the trio of vigilante cops; he is killed by being thrown off the roof of a building.; Notes: This is the first episode to credit Tirk Walker for composing the show's theme song, "Eyes of a Ranger" (performed by Chuck Norris), in the episode opening title card credits.; John Beck, who plays Sergent Lou Ross in this episode, later played two good characters in WTR: one was Max Elson in "Rainbow's End", and the other was Jake Foley in 2000's "Showdown at Casa Diablo, Part I".
84	5	"Plague"	Tony Mordente	Ron Swanson	October 19, 1996	408	14.2
An agricultural feed is tested on the Cherokee reservation by a company that is more interested with containing the information from research rather than to contain the virus. But when Walker learns that the company had murdered an informant who tried to inform Alex about the company's motives, he soon finds that the company intends to massacre the Cherokee inhabitants to keep their research a secret. Now, Walker is on a race against time before the research kills the natives and destroys the reservation. Antagonists: Brad Stanley - The CEO of an agricultural company intending to use a virus on the Cherokee reservation as part of his research with MP's in his pocket, with the real intention of killing the inhabitants of the reserve.; Dr. Sullivan - A corrupt scientist from an agricultural company and Stanley's right-hand man, intending to use a virus on the Cherokee reservation as part of his research with MP's in his pocket, with the real intention of killing the inhabitants of the reserve. He is betrayed and killed on Stanley's orders to help tie-up loose ends prior to the attempt to murder the Cherokee residents.
85	6	"Redemption"	Tony Mordente	William T. Conway	October 26, 1996	406	18.32
Alex's attorney father, Gordon Cahill (Rod Taylor), who walked out on his family years ago because of his problem with alcoholism, is defending Karl Mayes (Stephen McHattie), the crime boss that she is prosecuting. But when Mayes's lieutenant, Hendricks (Keith Szarabajka) disguises himself as a cop and kills a witness that Walker has in custody, Gordon quits the case out of disgust. However, this makes him a key witness and both he and Alex are next on Mayes' hit list. Antagonists: Karl Mayes (Stephen McHattie) - A crime kingpin whom Alex is prosecuting while her divorced father defended him (at least until he placed a hit on Alex's witness).; Hendricks (Keith Szarabajka) - Mayes' lieutenant.
86	7	"Codename: Dragonfly"	Michael Preece	Story by : Nicholas J. Corea; Teleplay by : Nicholas J. Corea & Bob Gookin	November 2, 1996	409	19.00
A military helicopter with stealth capabilities has been stolen to be utilized by a drug cartel. The thief turns out to be ex-Marine Randy Shrader (Marshall R. Teague), who betrayed and abandoned his unit during the war in Vietnam, leaving the men (including Walker) for dead. With no time to lose, Walker must catch Shrader before the helicopter falls into the cartel's hands. Antagonists: Randy Shrader (Marshall R. Teague) - A Vietnam War veteran from Walker past who hijacked a prototype attack chopper to sell to the Cartel to attack and kill many people.; Don Carlos (Reni Santoni) and Ramon Lopez del Vega Garcia (George DelHoyo) - Brothers and leaders of the del Vega Garcia cartel, one of the biggest drug cartels in Northeast Mexico. Ramon was imprisoned by Walker a few years prior to the episode, but Shrader broke him out.; Note: This is the first of six appearance by Charles Homet as Agent Troy Douglas "Doug" Foster.
87	8	"A Silent Cry"	Michael Preece	Mitchell Schneider	November 9, 1996	405	18.51
The Rangers seek out a trio of construction workers (Luca Bercovici, Timothy Vahle and Max Martini), who have been using date rape drugs to subdue, abduct, and assault young women. Things get personal for Walker when Darcy Reynolds (Yelba Osorio), the daughter of his friend Cora Reynolds (Rosanna DeSoto), falls victim to the trio while out celebrating her 21st birthday, and she struggles to deal with the traumatic experience. After the rapists' next victim turns up dead from a Rohypnol overdose, Walker turns up the heat on the investigation, prompting the trio to take drastic measures to shake the Rangers off their trail, but out of the trio, only one feels remorseful for his actions and is willing to cooperate should the Rangers catch him. Meanwhile, Alex and Darcy's mother try to get Darcy to attend a rape victim support group, but Darcy finds the process too painful and wants to put the rape behind her. She later reconsiders when her mother reveals that she was raped by a family friend as a child, and that she regrets having suffered alone in silence all those years because of being unaware about victim's support groups like them in front of her daughter, Alex, and the support group. Antagonists: Wade Atkins (Luca Bercovici), Joey Hastings (Timothy Vahle), & Luke Powell (Max Martini) - Also known as the "Blackout Rapist" trio. These men hold down day jobs as construction workers, but by night, they're a trio of predators who drug and abduct their victims from nightclubs and proceed to rape them. They end up killing one of their victims due to putting more drugs in her drink than usual, which could result in a death penalty case once they're caught and Darcy's testimony seals their fates. Meanwhile, Hastings, remorseful for one of their victims turning up dead (and whose composite sketch Darcy helped Trivette produce was broadcast on the news), was willing to turn himself in and cooperate with the Rangers, but before Atkins and Powell plot to kill Darcy and Cora so they can't testify against them in court (Hastings alerted Walker and Trivette to the attempted murder), they kill him to keep him from talking, as well.; Jake Prentice (Mark Rolston) - A nightclub owner who supplies Rohypnol to the rapist trio for their crimes and others for recreational use.; Ozzie Franks (Stephen R. Miller) - A criminal whom Walker and Trivette busted a year prior for narcotics trafficking. While he was visiting Jake Prentice's drug house for some recreational Rohypnol, the two Rangers found him to be in violation of his parole with outstanding warrants. Before the Rangers execute the raid on Prentice's drug house, they pursue and arrest him again.
88	9	"Swan Song"	Karl Kases	Story by : Lou & Liz Comici; Teleplay by : Gordon T. Dawson	November 16, 1996	411	20.60
Walker and Alex lead an expedition in Utah to locate a crashed plane, that was used as an escape by criminals eight years ago to rob a bank and kill seven people, including the local sheriff, who was one of Walker's friends. However, a group of opportunists hearing that there is three million dollars on board, secretly follow the group to take the cash for themselves. Unbeknownst to either group, one of the robbers survived the plane crash, and has been living in a cave as a mountain cannibal, who now stalks the two groups looking to claim more victims. Antagonist: Floyd Burbage (Jan Eddy) - A murderous armed robber who escaped by plane and hid out in the Utah wilderness after crashing; he has since turned to cannibalism after years of isolation. He is killed in the end by a grizzly bear.
89	10	"Cyclone"	Tony Mordente	Nicholas J. Corea & Bob Gookin	November 23, 1996	414	21.52
As a tornado approaches Dallas, kidnappers demand $10 million for a school bus full of kidnapped children ($1 million for each child), as well as C.D. and Alex, which unknown to the Rangers has been buried alive. Walker and Trivette must locate the bus during severe weather before either its occupants run out of air due to the bus being crumpled under the weight of the dirt, or get swallowed up by the tornado. Antagonists: Taylor Griffin (Edward Albert) - the leader of a kidnapping ring who abducts Alex, C.D., and a bunch of kids after bribing the mayor's assistant, holding them for a $10 million ransom, and burying them underground without air tanks, intending to let them all suffocate to eliminate witnesses.; Gibson (Frank Ranaudo) - Griffin's lieutenant.; Paul Richardson (Eamonn Roche) - The assistant of the Mayor of Dallas, and the inside man of Griffin's gang who was appalled with the idea of killing innocent people on the bus and was killed by Griffin out of spite. He later repented and pointed out the location of the bus to Walker and Trivette with his last breath.
90	11	"Lucky"	Tony Mordente	Story by : Bob Gookin & Rick Husky; Teleplay by : Bob Gookin	November 30, 1996	404	17.43
A homeless man's dog helps Walker track down the assailants behind an assault and near death of a priest. Meanwhile, Alex and C.D. put on a charity Thanksgiving dinner. Antagonist: Boone Holland - A corrupt land developer who has a priest attacked after failing to acquire a piece of land from him to build his condominiums.
91	12	"The Deadliest Man Alive"	Tony Mordente	Calvin Clements Jr.	December 14, 1996	410	16.36
Steven Michael "The Viper" Jamieson (Kai Wulff), a deadly international assassin, is in Texas to fulfill his latest contract. Being Walker, he sniffs out Jamieson faster than you can say "In the Line of Fire"...but finding the Viper and taking him down are two very different things. Antagonist: Steven Michael "The Viper" Jamieson (Kai Wulff) - A legendary international assassin and marksman known to take out high profile targets and intends to hit his last target, that of the Ambassador of the State of Israel. Notes: According to this episode, Walker was at the Dealey Plaza in Dallas with his parents when President John F. Kennedy was shot.; Kai Wulff previously co-starred as Chuck Norris's arch-nemesis, in the latter's final (to date) theatrical release: the action-comedy Top Dog. Wulff would return to WTR, in a different role, for the 1999 episode "Power Angels".
92	13	"A Ranger's Christmas"	Michael Preece	Nicholas J. Corea	December 21, 1996	416	17.38
Walker tells the story of the Old West's Hayes Cooper, a Scrooge-like Texas Ranger who finally learned to have Christmas spirit. This episode aired just four days before Christmas in 1996. Antagonists: Cody Diggs (John Dennis Johnston) - A vicious 19th Century outlaw who forced a family man to assist in a robbery after kidnapping his infant son.; Reneau (Clarence Gilyard)- An outlaw from New Orleans who is one of Diggs' best men.; Jake (Noble Willingham) - An outlaw who is also one of Diggs' best men.
93	14	"Mayday"	Tony Mordente	Story by : Rick Husky; Teleplay by : Nicholas J. Corea & Rick Husky	January 11, 1997	412	19.61
After surviving a plane crash in the Utah wilderness that was supposed to kill him and Charlie Brooks (Terry Kiser), an important witness and former criminal's accountant, Walker must protect Charlie and the other survivors from hit men who have come to finish them off. Antagonist: Jackson Blake Dupree (William Jordan) - A money launderer hunting Charlie Brooks to kill him for stealing his money. Notes: This is the first of three appearances by Terry Kiser as Charlie Brooks. Kiser also appeared in the Chuck Norris films An Eye for an Eye (as Norris's ill-fated partner) and Forest Warrior (as a sinister-if-doltish lumber magnate).; Sherman Howard, who portrays Mr. Burrows, previously had a villainous role as Sonny Lyle in Season 3's "Blue Movies".
94	15	"Last Hope"	Rich Thorne	Teleplay by : Bob Gookin; Story by : I.B. Otto & Bob Gookin	January 18, 1997	415	20.29
The Rangers set up a camp to help troubled teens with pressure, with the assistance of Charlie Brooks, who had been sentenced to community service; Walker helps an abused boy named Eddie del Toro to protect him from his mother’s abusive live-in boyfriend, who gets really rough. However, one of the teens endangers everybody at Ranger Camp by unknowingly stealing a money bag from drug dealers. With Walker indisposed of, as he had been called away earlier, Trivette, CD, Alex and Charlie must deal with the drug dealers alone. Antagonists: Unnamed Drug Dealers whom the delinquent teens spark the ire of after stealing a suitcase of their profits from their drug-deals. One of their customers, a man named Lance Charles (portrayed by Shaun Toub), met an explosive end when he discovered too late his purchase was rigged with a bomb. The leader of the drug dealers is portrayed by David Allen Brooks, and his second-in-command is portrayed by Jesse Corti. Notes: This episode includes a young Mila Kunis as the character ‘Pepper’.; David Allen Brooks, who portrayed the leader of the drug dealers who attacked the camp, would appear again as another villain in Season 7's "Mind Games".
95	16	"Full Contact"	Michael Preece	John Lansing & Bruce Cervi	February 1, 1997	413	17.06
Joey Prado (John Haymes Newton), the world kickboxing champion and a protegé of Walker's is working to defend his title against arrogant up-and-coming hotshot Bart "The Destroyer" Valen (Tim Griffin). Bart's manager and older brother Frank (Gary Hudson) also happens to be Joey's predecessor as world champion, but had lost the title after he was discovered to have been using steroids and almost killed the sports reporter who exposed him, with the latter act also landing him in prison for several years. Frank, determined to regain his former glory by having his brother become the next champion, aims to ensure that Bart wins by any means necessary. After he and Bart goad Joey into losing his temper at a press conference, Frank decides to further shake up and discredit him by framing him for illegal drug possession. Unfortunately, Joey's longtime mentor and trainer Gino Costa (Bill Cobbs) catches Frank in the act of planting the drugs in Joey's gym bag, forcing Frank to kill him to keep him quiet. The drugs are then uncovered in the ensuing investigation, which also puts Joey under suspicion of having killed Gino. Things get even worse when Frank has more drugs planted at Joey's apartment and reported anonymously, forcing the police to arrest and charge Joey. Walker works to help Joey fight the legal allegations and train him for the championship match, while Trivette works with the investigating detective to clear his name and prove the Valens' criminal actions. Antagonists: Frank Valen (Gary Hudson) - Bart's older brother and trainer, who was once a former champion until he was hit with a steroid scandal that ended his career, and plots revenge against Prado by planting drugs in his bag, and ends up killing latter's trainer who caught him red-handed.; Bart "The Destroyer" Valen (Tim Griffin) - A hotshot boxer determined to dethrone Joey Prado of his world title, and is willing to play dirty with the help of his older brother Frank.; Note: That's real-life martial arts-legend Bob Wall (of Enter the Dragon fame) as the kickboxing-referee.
96	17	"99th Ranger"	Tony Mordente	Gordon T. Dawson	February 8, 1997	417	17.02
While looking into recruiting a replacement for Texas Ranger Walt Cobb, who was killed in a shootout during a sting operation on a chop shop, two applicants for the vacant position-- Brookdale police officer Roberta "Bobbie" Hunt (Tammy Lauren) and DPS Trooper Sgt. Santiago Perez (Damian Chapa), respectively-- shadow Walker and Trivette for their respective field evaluations to determine who gets the job. While shadowing Walker during her field evaluation, Bobbie has long been haunted by her violent ex-husband Russell Stafford (Jeff Kober). The harassment by him eventually becomes so bad, that she almost gives up her dream of becoming a Texas Ranger until Walker convinces her otherwise. But when Stafford ignores the restraining order Walker had Alex issue and attacks her in her home, Bobbie must fight him off on her own. Antagonists: Russell Stafford (Jeff Kober) - Bobbie's abusive ex-husband and former private detective whose harassment nearly dissuade her from joining the Rangers to protect her daughter. After killing the DPS officer who brought his restraining order, attempted to kill Bobbie in her home. It was only with the help of a martial arts technique that Walker taught her she was able to break free of his hold, leading to his death when he was accidentally stabbed by his own knife.; Grady Lomax (Charlie Paddock) - A drug dealer and chop shop owner who kills Ranger Walt Cobb in the line of duty.
97	18	"Devil's Turf"	Michael Preece	Bob Gookin	February 15, 1997	418	17.86
Walker goes undercover as a high school teacher to help bust a drug ring that are using Powerballs, a deadly hybrid drug of steroids and methamphetamine that had killed a couple of students, as well as help his students improve themselves. During the mission, Walker's contact, Danny O'Bannon (Bobby Jacoby), an undercover rookie Ranger posing as a student and whose older brother (Eric Bruskotter) works as the custodian, finds himself in big trouble when he infiltrates the source of the operation. Antagonists: Michael "Big Mick" Stanley (Sam J. Jones) - A gym owner who is selling experimental steroids called Powerballs to High School students, which have killed some of them. Also willing to kill students who do not pay what they owe them such as Billy Cochran (Marcus Allen Lasha) and Tommy Landers (Scott Hamm), to which the latter and his classmate Nina (who became involved accidentally) were nearly killed prior to the Rangers arriving and saving them.; Tony Delfina (Curtis Lupo) - One of Big Mick's men. He was the one who was secretly supplying the drugs to the High School students through their lockers and killed Billy Cochran. After being captured by Walker for lying to him when he was investigating Danny's beating (after Stanley caught him infiltrating the gym), Trivette interrogates him, and once the fingerprint evidence was found at the school, Tony was forced to confess to avoid a harsh punishment, playing a vital role for the Rangers in busting Big Mick and saving Tommy and Nina (Melissa Renee Martin) from being murdered.; Notes: Eric Bruskotter, who plays Joey O'Bannon in this episode, previously played Jonah Nelson one season earlier in "The Lynching".; Bobby Jacoby, who portrays undercover rookie Ranger Danny O'Bannon, is the younger brother of Billy Jayne, who played Derek Malloy one season earlier in "Flashpoint".; Sam Jones, who plays "Big Mick" Stanley in this episode, previously played another villain, Samuel J. Bodine/Tommy Williams, several seasons earlier in "Unfinished Business".
98	19	"Days Past"	Tony Mordente	Nicholas J. Corea	February 22, 1997	419	16.96
After 10 years, racketeer Vincent "Vince" Pike (Leon Rippy) - whose murder victims include Walker's fiancée, Ellen Garrett (Jennifer Grant), but Pike's intended target was Walker himself - is given an early release. Pike immediately vents his grudge by targeting C.D., Trivette, and Alex for assassination. It's up to an equally-vengeful Walker to protect his friends, while sniffing out sufficient evidence to put his old nemesis out of business permanently. Antagonists: Vincent "Vince" Pike (Leon Rippy) - An incarcerated racketeer who killed Walker's fiancée in a failed ambush attempt to kill Walker and is given an early release with a chance for revenge.; Jack Mitchell (E.K. Spila) - One of Pike's best men who served as his top lieutenant during his time in the slammer, is brutally murdered when he turns against him about going after Walker's friends.; Benny Flynn (Don Harvey) - One of Pike's best men, who is promoted to lieutenant after Pike murders Jack Mitchell. Under threat of being sent to death row upon being arrested after trying to kill Alex, he reluctantly agrees to testify against Pike.; J.J. Mobley (Billy Maddox) - One of Pike's best men, who does some freelance muscle work for him.; Note: Leon Rippy previously co-starred in WTR's first season episode "Borderline" as Dewey Baker; he would later appear in the two-part series finale as both Robert Chastain, and Creede.
99	20	"Trial of LaRue"	Michael Preece	Gordon T. Dawson	March 8, 1997	420	15.17
Walker's old nemesis, Victor LaRue (Wayne Péré), disarms bailiffs during his competency hearing and takes the entire courtroom hostage... killing his own defense attorney (Richard Portnow), another criminal Trivette apprehended (Brian Libby) and the judge (Tonea Stewart), taunting Alex, and waiting for Walker to show up. Walker is away, tracking down other criminals (and apprehending them with his usual violent ease). "Judge LaRue" proceeds to terrorize and/or kill jurors and litigants at random...including a divorced couple who were there for a custody hearing. After rounding up the other criminals, Walker finally discovers what's going on via radio and TV coverage; he rushes back to Dallas, makes his way to the courthouse, and quickly guns down LaRue. As the villain's body is wheeled away on a gurney, Alex has a conscious nightmare about him snapping back to life. Antagonists: Victor LaRue (Wayne Péré) - A violent psychopath who takes an entire courtroom hostage and is determined to get his revenge on Alex and Walker after killing his defense attorney and another criminal Trivette arrested, only for him to meet his end at Walker's hands.; Luke (Robert Winley) and Rudy Babbich (Rocky Giordani) - Criminal brothers whom Walker is pursuing out in the backwoods of Waxahachie during the LaRue courtroom crisis.; Buddy Rebotco (Brian Libby) - A criminal Trivette apprehended for armed robbery, two counts of aggravated assault and resisting arrest, which left Trivette injured. When he turns down LaRue's offer to join forces, LaRue kills him.; Note: This is Wayne Pere's third and final appearance as Victor LaRue; the first two were the Season 4 episode "Cowboy", and in the Season 5 episode "Return of LaRue". Pere himself, however, later co-starred in the Season 6 two-parter "Last of a Breed" as Cuadroza.
100	21	"Heart of the Dragon"	Michael Preece	Bob Gookin	April 5, 1997	422	15.26
Walker protects a college student (Steven Ho) of Dr. Henry Lee's (Mako)-- who is the father of his old friend, Susan Lee, from "Higher Power", and is therefore, Davey's grandfather-- who has stolen a jade dragon from a Chinese gang who believes it has magical power that will heal his sister after a D.W.I. accident that killed their parents. At the same time, Dr. Henry Lee is dealing with health issues of his own. Antagonists: Jiang Chu (Ron Winston Yuan) - The leader of the Golden Tong who wants the Jade Dragon in order to harness its powers and kills members of a rival gang to get it.; Chia Ko (Roger Yuan) - Chu's second-in-command.; Notes: Ron and Roger Yuan, who portrayed Jiang and Chia, respectively, are brothers in real life.; Roger Yuan would have another villainous role on Walker as Lazarus during the 4-part "Chairman" story arc.
101	22	"The Neighborhood"	Eric Norris	Nicholas J. Corea	April 26, 1997	421	18.95
One of Walker's karate students, ten-year-old Kyla Jarvis (Kyla Pratt), is mortally wounded in a drive-by shooting but inexplicably makes a full recovery. According to Kyla, she had a near-death experience: going to Heaven and encountering an Angel, who gave her a divine mission from God...to end violence in her community, however she can. Walker helps by urging her grandfather Leon Barlow (a frustrated Vietnam veteran, who now leads a vigilante clique comprising numerous frustrated locals) to use a less-violent approach when dealing with gangs. Walker also pits himself against the "B-3 Dukes": a ruthless gang led by cold-blooded Zach Russell (Stoney Jackson), who arranged the drive-by shooting which killed — briefly — Kyla; the intended target was Barlow, in revenge for the firebombing of Russell's crack house. Finally, Walker and Kyla strive to help conflicted gangbanger Bobby Miller (Patrick Malone) — the one who actually shot Kyla — to put his "gangsta" lifestyle behind him. Antagonist: Zach Russell (Stoney Jackson) - a gang leader who seeks revenge against Leon Barlow as payback for one of his crack houses being torched and wound up almost killing his granddaughter accidentally.
102	23	"A Father's Image"	João Fernandes	Gordon T. Dawson	May 3, 1997	423	17.52
Ranger Bobbie Hunt (Tammy Lauren, last seen in "99th Ranger") goes undercover to gather evidence against crime boss Sal Matacio (Dan Lauria). Matacio is grooming his ten-year-old son Nicholas (Joseph Ashton) to take over the family business, while plotting to kill his ex-wife Dana (Mary Chris Wall)...lest she testify against him on the Rangers' behalf. Antagonists: Salvatore "Sal" Matacio (Dan Lauria) - A mob boss running a crystal meth operation, while using harsh methods to groom his young son for the family affairs and to undertake his criminal activity. Ultimately his plot to have his ex-wife Dana murdered to prevent her from testifying against him, helped convince Dana to accept Walker and Alex's offer to testify, and also turned Nicholas against him.; Tom Loomis (Bob Minor): An ex-CIA agent who is now Matacio's lieutenant. He does a background check on the work history of the cover that Bobbie was using, but becomes suspicious when he meets Trivette, which this suspicion is later confirmed when he confirms that Trivette was the voice he heard on the phone during his earlier check, which essentially blows Bobbie's cover.; Rebecca Matacio (Elizabeth Sandifer) - Sal's current wife who cannot stand Nicholas. Later has her suspicions when Nicholas' new teacher Bobbie under her cover as Miss Justin arrives to live with them, which are later confirmed once Loomis confirms she is a cop. Later confronts Bobbie, but is ultimately defeated by her in a fist fight.; Note: This is Tammy Lauren's second and final appearance as "Bobbie Hunt"; her character will never be heard from or mentioned after this episode.
103	24	"Sons of Thunder"	Aaron Norris	Teleplay by : Bob Gookin; Story by : Chuck Norris & Aaron Norris	May 4, 1997	425-A	18.34
104	25	"Sons of Thunder"	Aaron Norris	Teleplay by : Bob Gookin; Story by : Chuck Norris & Aaron Norris	May 4, 1997	425-B	18.34
When a preacher friend (Ed Bruce) of Walker's dies, his military son, Trent, returns to take care of his family. Walker tries to get him to become a police officer, but this proves difficult because of Trent's refusal to carry a firearm (because of a childhood incident with a revolver that resulted in the death of a friend). Meanwhile, a serial cop-killer is on the loose and one of the targets happens to be Carlos Sandoval, a good friend of Walker and Trent. (Note: In syndication, this is a two-part episode.) The search for a cop killer gets personal especially for Walker. When Trivette is shot by the suspect with a different gun and left badly injured while following a lead, it confirms that the cop-killer is not killing at random but is instead only targeting certain cops due to a personal vendetta. Walker and Trent soon discover that the killer's next target is Carlos, as Carlos confirms the killer is actually a violent ex-cop named Rod Barkley, who is targeting the cops he blames for ruining his career. Antagonist: Rod Barkley (Jan Michael Shultz) - A serial cop killer and former Dallas PD officer who seeks revenge against Sandoval and other officers who reported him after he brutally attacked a suspect, getting him fired from the police force and landing him in prison.
105	26	"Texas vs. Cahill"	Michael Preece	Bob Gookin & Glenn A. Bruce	May 10, 1997	426	18.53
When Alex's former lover, Tony Seville (Christopher Allport), who's also the defending attorney in her current trial, turns up dead beside her in bed, she's accused of his murder and sent to a women's prison that's packed with inmates who hold a grudge against her, though her cellmate, who was put in there due to a botched defense, is able to protect her. While Gordon Cahill returns to defend Alex in court, he helps Walker suspect that Lane Tillman (Robert Forster) — the man Alex was prosecuting — had a good reason to frame her. Antagonist: Lane Tillman (Robert Forster) - A man who killed Tony Seville and framed Alex for murder in an effort to use double jeopardy to get off for his crimes. The night of the murder, Tony had hidden a video camera in the ventilation duct in Alex's apartment, and the murder was caught on tape, which Tony's sister, Mollie (Alissa Alban), got her hands on after he mailed her a key to Alex's apartment. When Tillman found out, he wanted the evidence destroyed and Mollie killed, but Walker and Trivette intercepted and presented the video in court, ultimately dismissing the murder case against Alex and a bench warrant being issued for him. When Walker and Trivette visit his estate to arrest him, he willingly surrenders after the two Rangers easily dispatch his henchmen. Notes: This episode marks the last of Forster's two appearances on WTR; his first was "The Big Bingo Bamboozle".
106	27	"Rookie"	Tony Mordente	Nicholas J. Corea	May 17, 1997	424	15.10
Joey Prado (John Haymes Newton), after retiring from kickboxing, graduates from the police academy with the best marks since Walker. One of his first assignments is to go undercover as a drug dealer. Along the way, he reunites with his childhood friend and sworn blood brother, Victor Solano (Damon Collazo), who is one of the men he has to arrest. Joey finds himself in the precarious position of having to deceiving his former friend by convincing him that he is a criminal and earning his trust in order to gather enough evidence to take down both Victor and his boss. Antagonists: Henry Brown - Solano's boss who plots to distribute drugs into the public schools; Victor Solano (Damon Collazo) - Prado's childhood friend who is now an enforcer and drug dealer.; Note: John Newton's second and final appearance (following "Full Contact") as Joey Prado...who will not be mentioned, heard from, or seen again after this episode.

=== Season 6 (1997–98) ===
No. overall	No. in season	Title	Directed by	Written by	Original release date	Prod. code	Viewers (millions)
107	1	"The Fighting McLains"	Tony Mordente	Nicholas J. Corea	September 27, 1997	504	15.49
Belle Starr McLain (Keri Jo Chapman), a mole for the DEA, is exposed and murdered by drug kingpin Jack Garrett (Patrick St. Esprit). Then her Marine brother Corporal John Wesley "JW" McLain (Stephen Quadros), to whom she sent proof of Garrett's drug activities, goes AWOL to launch a vendetta against the drug kingpin. Instead, JW is intercepted and captured by Walker. After JW's commanding officer, Staff Sergeant Luther Parrish (James Pickens Jr.), comes to pick him up, JW is sprung by his two other siblings, Jessie (Tava Smiley) and Wyatt (Bart Johnson). Now Walker, Trivette, and Parrish must keep the McLains from taking the law into their own hands to avenge their sister, while at the same time gathering sufficient evidence to bust Garrett for his crimes, who attempts to kill the McLains after he captures and murders the informant that was exposed due to JW's earlier actions. Antagonists: Jack Garrett (Patrick St. Esprit) - A drug kingpin being targeted for death by the McLain family after their sister, Belle, an undercover DEA agent, is killed by him after being unmasked, and vice-versa when he captures and kills Sid Jarvis, the informant who JW exposed.; Jake Reed (Hank Stone) - Garrett's lieutenant.; Notes: This plotline was recycled considerably for the TV movie Logan's War: Bound by Honor, in which Eddie Cibrian portrays Airborne Ranger Logan Fallon. As a child, Logan witnessed the murder of his sister and their parents by a corrupt politician; Logan withholds all evidence regarding their killer from the authorities, since this matter is personal. The difference herein is that the Chuck Norris character – Logan's uncle Jake, himself a retired Airborne Ranger – supports this private vendetta instead of opposing it. Moreover, like many episodes of WTR, the movie has a supernatural element: Logan's never-explained premonitions of danger.; Hank Stone, who portrays Jake Reed, would have two other villainous roles in WTR as bank robber Frank Hillman one season later in "Mind Games" and a biker named Tramp in Season 9's "Unsafe Speed".; This is one of two WTR episodes Patrick St. Esprit and Hank Stone have worked together in. The other one was Season 9's "Unsafe Speed", where St. Esprit portrays a drug kingpin named Darby.
108	2	"Iceman"	Christian I. Nyby II	David Bennett Carren & J. Larry Carroll	October 4, 1997	501	15.39
A freelance explosives expert known as the Iceman (Terry Kiser) is hospitalized following an explosive chase. The Rangers ask their ne'er-de-well friend Charlie Brooks (Kiser in a dual role) to help them catch a crime boss for whom the Iceman was working for. As part of a deal to end his community service, the bumbling Charlie poses as the Iceman... only to lose the tracking device which Walker planted on him. It doesn't help when the real Iceman escapes from the hospital. Antagonists: George Vickers (Carmen Argenziano) - Leader of a heist crew who hired the Iceman for a bank robbery using explosives.; Ortiz (Billy Gallo) - Vickers' second-in-command.; Maxwell 'Iceman' Kronert (Terry Kiser) - A freelance explosives expert and former Navy SEAL and Charlie Brooks's doppelganger, hired by Vickers for a bank robbery using explosives.; Flynn (Vince Deadrick Jr.) - The Iceman's wheelman. After Walker, Trivette and Foster are nearly killed by a microwave bomb while FBI agents stake out the Iceman's Dallas hideout, an explosive chase ensues. While Walker and Trivette pursue him and the Iceman, dodging two grenades along the way, Walker performs a PIT maneuver on the getaway vehicle, which causes the Iceman to drop one grenade before he could throw it. Flynn was killed while the Iceman escaped the getaway vehicle before it exploded, but ended up hospitalized afterwards.; Notes: Carmen Argenziano, who plays the primary villain of the episode, George Vickers, previously portrayed Walker's D.E.A. friend, Paco Cruz, several seasons earlier in "On Deadly Ground".; Billy Gallo, who plays Vickers' right-hand man, Ortiz, would go on to play an ally of Walker's later in the season in "Test of Faith": Ricardo Lopez.
109	3	"Lucas: Part 1"	Michael Preece	Teleplay by : Nicholas J. Corea; Story by : Chuck Norris & Aaron Norris	October 11, 1997	502	15.03
An AIDS-stricken 7-year-old (Haley Joel Osment) tries to find his mother (MacKenzie Phillips), with Walker's help. Lucas's mother passes away at the end of the episode. Antagonist: Rafer Cobb (Brion James) - A drug kingpin who held Lucas and his mother hostage, but later after the death of Lucas's mother, he wants to kill him as he is a key witness in the trial against him.
110	4	"Lucas: Part 2"	Michael Preece	Story by : Chuck Norris & Aaron Norris; Teleplay by : Nicholas J. Corea	October 18, 1997	503	14.58
After Lucas' mother dies, Walker takes him to the Cherokee Reservation to help him overcome his nightmares and tell him about his AIDS condition. At the same time, Walker also must stop a powerful drug cartel leader before he kills Lucas, as he's the only witness to his drug operation. As soon as the cartel boss is caught, Lucas passes away from his own AIDS at the end of the episode. Antagonist: Rafer Cobb (Brion James) - A drug kingpin who held Lucas and his mother hostage, but later after the death of Lucas's mother, he wants to silence him, but learns that Lucas is in possession of a key to chunk of money that could help him disappear.
111	5	"Forgotten People"	Tony Mordente	Teleplay by : Mick Curran; Story by : Mick Curran & Mitchell Schneider	October 25, 1997	507	13.71
Trivette visits his old friend Josh Leonard (who is also his girlfriend's father) in a nursing home, who is unable to find the tape recorder he had that would tell Trivette about the suspicious things the doctors were up to, not knowing that one of the home's abusive orderlies had found it first. Upon learning of this evidence, the administrator (Gail Strickland) and head doctor (Michael Krawic) murder Josh and make it look like a heart attack to prevent him from exposing them. Trivette's suspicions are piqued as clues emerge that suggest the doctors are conducting illegal experiments on their elderly patients in order to put a new Alzheimer's drug on the market to profit from, and the trials have already led to the deaths of nine patients. C.D. is sent in undercover as an Alzheimer's patient to gather evidence to prove this, unaware that another patient (special guest star Gwen Verdon) is also undercover for the same reason after her best friend's similar death. Meanwhile, Walker, Trivette and Alex have the bodies of the nine patients exhumed and autopsied to find traces of the illegal drugs in order to obtain a search warrant. Antagonists: Dr. Janet Monroe (Gail Strickland) - The corrupt administrator of the nursing home who is using the elderly residence as guinea pigs to test an FDA-banned Alzheimer's drug with fatal results and has hired ex-convicts as orderlies.; Dr. John Daniels (Michael Krawic) - The corrupt head physician of the nursing home, and Dr. Monroe's right-hand man, lover and chemical engineer, who administers the drug to the elderly with the help of Dr. Monroe.; Derrick (John Swasey) and Fisher (Mark Hankla) - The nursing home's corrupt chief orderlies.
112	6	"Last of a Breed: Part 1"	Michael Preece	Gordon T. Dawson	November 1, 1997	508	15.11
Children visiting the Texas Rangers Hall of Fame get treated to Walker telling a story about the Old West's legendary Hayes Cooper. Antagonists: Silas Bedoe (Ed Lauter) - A land baron determined to remove a family of farmers from a piece of land he is determined to take, and does not hesitate to have the Wilsons killed after they refuse to sell their land.; Rudd Kilgore (Marshall R. Teague) - The ruthless leader of an outlaw gang and Bedoe's top enforcer in 19th Century Texas who is also a skilled gunslinger, hired by Bedoe to kill the entire Wilson family after they refuse to sell their land to Bedoe.; Cuadroza (Wayne Péré) - Kilgore's lieutenant.; Note: Chuck Norris is the only series regular to appear in this two-part episode, which actually contradicts Hayes Cooper's backstory...in particular, how and when Cooper became a Texas Ranger (as depicted in Season 3's two-parter "Flashback").
113	7	"Last of a Breed: Part 2"	Michael Preece	Gordon T. Dawson	November 8, 1997	509	15.20
Walker continues to tell the story of Hayes Cooper. And he continues when Cooper upon seeing the family he befriended killed, he sets out to go after the ones he believes responsible for their deaths. After getting one of them, he meets a Texas Ranger (Robert Fuller) who warns him about crossing the line and after saying that he gives Cooper a Texas Ranger badge which Cooper takes. After tracking down his quarries, he gets shot but is found by some Indians who nurse him back to health and gives him a moment to think. Antagonists: Silas Bedoe (Ed Lauter) - A land baron determined to remove a family of farmers from a piece of land he is determined to take, and does not hesitate to have the Wilsons killed after they refuse to sell their land.; Rudd Kilgore (Marshall R. Teague) - The ruthless leader of an outlaw gang and Bedoe's top enforcer in 19th Century Texas who is also a skilled gunslinger, hired by Bedoe to kill the entire Wilson family after they refuse to sell their land to Bedoe.; Cuadroza (Wayne Péré) - Kilgore's lieutenant.; Notes: Robert Fuller would return to WTR as another Texas Ranger, Wade Harper, for the 2000 episode "A Matter of Principle".
114	8	"Brainchild"	Michael Preece	Nicholas J. Corea	November 15, 1997	505	16.48
Chad Morgan (David Gallagher) is a youngster with telekinetic powers and a genius-level IQ. He lives at a prison-like research center, whose head scientist (Paul Gleason) is fatally overtaxing Chad's abilities...to the chagrin of the facility's sole sympathetic scientist. Accordingly, Chad flees the center and meets up with Walker...who proceeds to help find the boy's long-presumed-dead mother (Anne Lockhart). Antagonists: Dr. Harold Payton (Paul Gleason) - A corrupt scientist who plotted to separate his last employee from her son, Chad, for his nefarious experiments involving his telekinetic abilities.; Morton J. Wilkens (Spencer Prokop) - Dr. Payton's Teflon assistant.; Lt. Fowler (Ken Greaves) - Dr. Payton's Head of Security and top enforcer.; J.J. Garson (Billy Maddox) - A robber who steals money from people who get their money out of ATM machines.
115	9	"Mr. Justice"	Eric Norris	Teleplay by : Bob Gookin; Story by : Bob Gookin & Rebecka S. Norris	November 22, 1997	512	16.46
A new "boot camp" for young offenders to save them from a hardened prison life comes under heavy opposition from a commissioner (Richard Folmer) who believes prison is the only solution, and who won't stop at playing dirty to sabotage Walker's "Camp Justice" program, much to the detriment of his deputy (Mod Squad star Clarence Williams III). U.S. Senator Kay Bailey Hutchison makes a special guest appearance as herself. Antagonists: Commissioner Mark Simpson (Richard Folmer) - The State Commissioner who is determined to see Walker's program fail to preserve his funding for more prisons.; Jerry "Mad Dog" Sullivan (Zack Ward) - A young convict looking at being sent to Huntsville, but was given a chance to join Camp Justice; he only uses the opportunity to plot his escape and is the only candidate to be sentenced afterwards.
116	10	"Rainbow's End"	Eric Norris	Nicholas J. Corea	December 6, 1997	510	14.56
James Lee Crown (Randolph Mantooth), a horse owner, wants to win races in order to increase the stud fees of his race horses, even if it means by cheating. Crown murders a rival horse that beat his horse in a race hours earlier, and its owner, Wes Calhoun (Miles Mutchler). Crown also kills the trainer, Lee Kincaid (Steve Shearer), who had secretly been working with him to try to fix the race. Max Elson (John Beck), a friend of Walker’s, and his daughter Jo (Lea Moreno), are preparing their promising newcomer, Rainbow’s End, for the prestigious Lone Star Derby, making them Crown’s next targets in his scheme to fix an upcoming race. Working with Calhoun's widow, Sally (Molly McClure), who is also serving as Rainbow's sponsor, Walker and Trivette must gather the evidence to link Crown to the murders of her husband and their prize racehorse while preventing him from making the Elsons and their horse his next victims. Antagonists: James Lee Crown (Randolph Mantooth) - A corrupt race horse owner who is known to rig horse races to up the profit on his racehorses and is willing to kill those who screw up his bets, including rival horses and their owners. His primary racer is named Samurai.; Barber (Bryan Rasmussen) and Holt (Marc Macaulay) - Crown's top enforcers.; Lee Kincaid (Steve Shearer) - The trainer for Wes Calhoun's horse, Gallant Boy, who had secretly been working with Crown to fix the races. He'd been working for Calhoun for 6 years. Hours after Gallant Boy won the race, narrowly beating Samurai, Crown killed him for his failure (though not before Calhoun chewed him out for double-crossing him) before killing Calhoun and Gallant Boy.; Notes: John Beck, who plays Max Elson in this episode, previously played Sergeant Lou Ross one season earlier in "The Brotherhood". Beck later played Jake Foley two seasons later in "Showdown at Casa Diablo, Part I".
117	11	"A Woman's Place"	Gregg Champion	Teleplay by : Dawn Ritchie; Story by : Dawn Ritchie & Hannah Louise Shearer	December 13, 1997	511	13.83
Alex's cellmate Alfre (from the season 5 episode "Texas vs. Cahill") is now out of prison (since Gordon Cahill was working on getting her released at the end of that episode) and has a job as a female construction worker, but she finds herself in danger after threatening to blow the whistle on unsafe construction practices, which are secretly caused by a small group of employees led by the site foreman (Chris Mulkey) who are actually running an illegal money-making scam behind their company owner's back. Walker and Alex must keep Alfre and her family safe and expose the scam before the group gets to her first to keep their activities secret. Antagonists: Leonard Cox (Chris Mulkey) - The Foreman for Gellis Construction who is cutting corners and ignoring safety protocols by using cheap material in order to save and pocket money and is even willing to kill any employee who threatens to blow the whistle to prevent their boss Paul Gellis from learning the truth. It eventually got to the point where he tried to kill Alfre, her mother and daughter, but he and his accomplices were beaten and arrested by Walker after Alex asked Walker to check on Alfre with her phone line cut off. Thanks to Alfre's testimony, Cox and his accomplices are later sentenced to 20 years in prison for the scam.; Nash (Gil Glasgow) and Riley (Carl Ciarfalio) - Construction workers and Cox's accomplices, who are also part of the scam. Along with Cox, they were also apprehended by Walker and given a 20-year prison sentence.; Alan Steele (Alan Ackles) - A corrupt Building Inspector who is also a mole in Cox's scam. He was also responsible for helping expose Alfre as a whistleblower and providing false reports related to Cox's actions. While his fate is unknown, he was likely both arrested and dismissed for his role in the scam at the end of the episode, with Alfre taking over his job as a building inspector.; Paine (Peter Paul DeLeo) - The leader of a group of gunrunners that Walker and Trivette are busy tracking on the El Paso/Juarez border.
118	12	"Small Blessings"	Eric Norris	Bob Gookin	December 20, 1997	506	15.01
When two recently adopted orphans named Cathy and Derek Jones (Mercedes Kastner and Jeremy A. Lelliot) run away from their new foster home when they misinterpret a discussion between their foster parents and think that one of them might be sent back to the orphanage (which was actually about how their foster parents could not afford to have two "cars"), they witness a murder committed by Tony Chan (Leo Lee), a gangster running a chain of illegal sweatshops across the country and the target of an investigation by the Rangers and the FBI; the murder victim in question was one of his workers (Myrna Cabello) continually protesting over the poor working conditions. With the help of Jack Belmont (the homeless veteran from the Season 5 episode "Lucky" portrayed by Burt Young) and FBI Agent Doug Foster, Walker and Trivette must save the two orphans from being killed by Chan before they could give testimony, and shut down his sweatshops. Antagonists: Tony Chan (Leo Lee) - A Chinese mobster who runs a series of sweatshops nationwide using immigrant labor (including minors), typically from the Hispanic and Asian communities, and will not hesitate to kill any of his employees for protesting against the working conditions and any witnesses to his crimes (including Derek and Cathy, who saw him kill one of his workers). Whenever the law got too close, he'll even resort to arson to cover his tracks, not caring who gets caught in the blaze. He killed 13 women and 7 children in one sweatshop he burned down and later tried to do the same to Derek, Cathy and Belmont after the latter found the former two using an abandoned building as their hiding spot.; Hector Garcia (Mike Mireles) - A Hispanic mobster and Chan's business partner involved in the sweatshops.
119	13	"Tribe"	Jerry Jameson	Nicholas J. Corea	January 3, 1998	513	17.09
Nora Shannon (Kerrie Keane), an archaeologist working on the Cherokee reservation, is murdered when a greedy oil company tycoon (Tomas Arana) learns there's oil under her dig site. Her rejected would-be suitor, Sam Coyote (Eloy Casados), a reservation cop and friend of Walker, is used to take the fall for her murder. Walker must work on clearing Sam's name before he is transferred to F.B.I. custody. Antagonist: Jack Mandell (Tomas Arana) - An oil tycoon and owner of a construction company who fails to scare off Nora Shannon and her crew, and then winds up having her killed and frames Sam Coyote for the murder.
120	14	"Saving Grace"	Jerry Jameson	John Lansing & Bruce Cervi	January 10, 1998	516	13.83
Five inmates bound for Huntsville stage a daring escape from a prison bus and kill the two guards onboard, two of whom-- Matt Walsh (Thomas Wilson Brown) and Ted Macy (Stuart Greer)-- had been arrested by Walker and Trivette for a recent bank robbery, where the money was never recovered. While Macy and fellow escapee Fred Corley (Ousaun Elam) look for the money, the other three-- Walsh, Brady Reese (Will Zahrn) and Kyle Finley (JD Evermore)-- take refuge in a church where Alex and her battered women's group are meeting and take them and two of the church's nuns (Lisa Wilcox and Barbara Bain) hostage while trying to work out a plan to permanently escape the authorities. It is revealed much later in the episode that Walsh has ties to the church dating back to his childhood and grows uncomfortable with the situation. Antagonists: Matthew 'Preacher' Walsh (Thomas Wilson Brown) - A former preacher convicted of armed robbery who escapes custody and takes refuge in the church together with his two of four accomplices. He later finds out during the standoff he is a long-lost sibling of one of the church's nuns (Wilcox), and then ends up killed by Reese when he develops a change of heart.; Ted Macy (Stuart Greer) - Preacher's partner in the robbery, who goes to retrieve their stolen loot from their robbery. He also has a girlfriend named Bonnie Sutherland (Amanda Welles), whose house the two kept the key for the safe deposit box for the loot. Corley assists him in locating the loot, but the two are recaptured by Walker and Trivette after a Dallas police officer unexpectedly cuts in front of the two Rangers and spooks the two robbers in their stolen vehicle. He was apprehended by Trivette while Walker followed Corley (who was trying to rendezvous with his cohorts) to the church, resulting in the two Rangers calling in Alex's hostage crisis.; Brady Reese (Will Zahrn), Fred Corley (Ousaun Elam) and Kyle Finley (JD Evermore) - Three other inmates who join Walsh and Macy in retrieving the loot. Walker and Trivette recall busting Reese in an unrelated case when they are first called to the site of where the prison bus had crashed. While Reese and Finley join Walsh at the church, Corley joins Macy in finding the stolen loot, only for their stolen vehicle to eventually be spotted by a Dallas PD officer. All three men are later recaptured by Walker-- Corley after he is followed to the church while trying to rendezvous with his accomplices (while Trivette apprehended Macy), and Finley and Reese during the standoff (though not before Reese killed Walsh).; Tanner (Tim Parati) and Floyd (Tom Young) - Accomplices of the five escapees, who have the guns and passports the five need to flee the country. As soon as Walker makes his way inside the church during the standoff, both are apprehended.
121	15	"Money Talks"	Tony Mordente	James L. Novack	January 17, 1998	514	16.07
C.D. is filling in temporarily as the head of security for Golden Wells, a Dallas area country club, until a replacement can arrive. While there, he becomes suspicious over the mystery of what happened to his predecessor. Walker, Trivette, and Alex are later asked to go to the club discreetly to help C.D. keep an eye on the rich CEOs that would be attending a social function at the club. However behind the scenes, C.D.'s second in command, Paul Grady (Mitch Pileggi), who had murdered the previous head of security when he got too close, is working with some men under a mysterious leader, to pull off a heist at the function. Antagonists: David Bracken (Kevin Cooney) - General Manager of Golden Wells, and the ringleader and mastermind of the heist plot. He was the one responsible for giving Gravis/Grady the clearance as far as the hiring situation went, and only agreed to accept C.D. as a temporary hire due to Grady being ineligible due to his background.; Paul Gravis/Paul Grady (Mitch Pileggi) - Under the alias "Paul Grady", a disguised security guard who is second-in-command at the Golden Wells resort plotting a ransom heist against wealthy benefactors who would be attending the place, and murders his boss, C.D.'s old friend, for knowing too much. He also spent time in Huntsville for aggravated assault, weapons violations and drug trafficking. The alias he used was what got him hired at Golden Wells in the first place, but also made him ineligible for a temporary promotion as it would require a more in-depth background check.
122	16	"The Crusader"	Rich Thorne	Bruce Cervi and John Lansing	January 31, 1998	518	14.56
Walker helps a pro wrestler Cody "The Crusader" Conway ("Rowdy" Roddy Piper) whose ex-wife, Barbara (Linda Purl), is in hiding after witnessing a murder by her boss, Tony Ramos (George DelHoyo), and has sent their son, Jake (Clay Jeter), whom he was unaware of to him for his own safety. However, Cody's attempt to bond with Jake becomes complicated, as Cody is dealing with stress, having recently learned from his doctor that he has a life-threatening condition which carries the risk of killing him if he attempts to wrestle again. When this stress causes Jake to run away and gets kidnapped by Ramos, Cody must work on negotiating with Ramos to get Jake back. Antagonists: Antonio Ernesto "Tony the Torch" Ramos (George DelHoyo) - A Miami mob boss and owner of a business who tracks down Barbara Conway to Dallas after she witnesses him kill a man. Two of his henchmen are portrayed by Vinnie Curto and Ike Gingrich. (Note: This was the last episode to air on CBS before the network's broadcast of the XVIII Olympic Winter Games in Nagano, Japan.)
123	17	"In God's Hands"	Michael Preece	Gordon T. Dawson	February 28, 1998	515	16.24
While pursuing a group of armed robbers following an ice hockey game, Trivette finds a 6-year-old boy named Danny McGee shot during his pursuit of one of the robbers and believes that he is responsible. Placed on suspension and having to deal with the moral implications which sends him into depression (such as inaccurate media coverage which implicates Trivette and gets him hassled by local drunks at a bar) and the wounded boy's older brother, Ted (Kaj-Erik Eriksen), Trivette finds the man leading the investigation against him is an officer (David New Nurse) who has a grudge against him for being passed over in favor of Trivette for initiation into the Texas Rangers, and who wants to have Trivette brought up on criminal charges. Meanwhile, Walker looks into proving that Kroeger (Sal Landi)— the man that Trivette was pursuing — was the one who shot Danny. Antagonists: Clyde Kroeger (Sal Landi) - A bank robber who got in a shootout with Trivette while being pursued for armed robbery, resulting in young Danny McGee being seriously injured, which Trivette was blamed for. Once Walker proved Trivette's innocence by locating the bullet lodged in a tree, Trivette targeted Kroeger during the raid and personally brought him down.; Lt. Moffett (David New Nurse) - A Dallas P.D. Officer who despises Trivette for passing him over when Trivette was chosen to become a Texas Ranger, who is leading the investigation into Danny's shooting. Though his request for a full criminal investigation against Trivette was denied, Moffett instead focused on creating doubt that Kroeger was there. Once Walker finds Trivette's bullet to confirm the truth, Commander Williams realizes what Moffett was doing and accusing the latter of allowing his vendetta to complicate the investigation, orders him to apologize to Trivette.; Ted McGee (Kaj-Erik Eriksen) - Danny's older brother who plots to murder Trivette as revenge for his brother's shooting. Using an illegal firearm he obtained, Ted targeted Trivette when he and Walker were looking for Trivette's bullet. Trivette was able to talk him down by confirming that Danny had a successful operation and was already recovering as Walker returns and confirms that Trivette was innocent all along.
124	18	"Undercover"	Michael Preece	Bob Gookin	March 7, 1998	519	14.48
While Trent Malloy's younger brother, Tommy (Shane Meier), is competing in a karate tournament against a rival dojo (which bullies from Tommy's school belong to), Detective Carlos Sandoval, who is undercover in a drug ring is found out by the ring leader (John Vargas) who had also previously murdered Carlos' older brother, Hector. The wounded Carlos escapes and is taken to a homeless shelter to recover. When Walker, Trent and the others don't hear back from Carlos, they immediately suspect something is wrong. Antagonist: Johnny "El Vaquero" Primo (John Vargas) - A drug kingpin who personally killed Carlos's older brother, Hector, because he was tired of being a drug addict. Using the alias "El Vaquero", Primo hoped he'd get off on a technicality by claiming that El Vaquero was still at large. After a homeless man whom he and Carlos had helped before tells Trent of Carlo's location, and after informing Walker, Trent confronts Primo, only to be held at gunpoint, forcing Walker to kill Primo in self-defense.
125	19	"Everyday Heroes"	Michael Preece	Bob Gookin	March 21, 1998	517	14.50
After he protects a woman from her abusive ex-husband, Trent is contacted by the abused wife of a drug lord who watched the news report about his recent exploit on TV and asks for his help in getting away from her violent husband. To succeed, Trent asks Walker to help. Antagonist: Rudy Mendoza (Andrew Divoff) - A violent drug lord who abuses his wife and kills three young drug addicts.
126	20	"Warriors"	João Fernandes	Bob Gookin	April 4, 1998	520	12.42
The Rangers' old friend, Susan Lee, the mother of Davey (reincarnation of Buddhist monk Lama Dolgin from the episode "Higher Power" and "Heart of the Dragon"), who works as geneticist, is kidnapped again by a supremacist group wanting to use her research (which was derived from her son's unique DNA which grants him a form of rapid healing) to create a race of genetically superior soldiers. Davey returns to the states with Master Rin, wanting to help Walker find his mother via a special bond he shares with his mother. To save her, however, Walker must contend with the group's genetically enhanced enforcer. Antagonists: Klaus Markham (Wolf Muser) - Head of the supremacist group who wants Susan's research.; Dr. Jarrad Buckler (George Wyner) - A corrupt scientist for the supremacist group, who also wants Susan's research in creating super-soldiers.; Keith Portman (William Katt) - Susan's ex-boyfriend involved in the organization that kidnapped her.; Boris (Curtis Lupo) - The genetically-enhanced super-soldier created by the organization led by Markham and Buckler using Susan's research and DNA (plus Davey's DNA as soon as he, too, was kidnapped). After his creators are arrested and Susan and Davey are rescued, he meets an explosive end when he is set on fire and kicked into a storage bay containing barrels of various flammable liquids below the laboratory.
127	21	"Angel"	Jerry Jameson	Bruce Cervi and John Lansing	April 18, 1998	522	14.76
Trivette's old girlfriend gets his help to locate her father, then kills him and knocks out Trivette (while Walker is at the boot camp started in "Mr. Justice"). The investigation leads to a Yardie drug gang so Trivette sets out find out why she killed her father, but first must save her when the gang suddenly attacks her. Antagonists: Bishop Andros (Grand L. Bush) - A Yardie gangster who contracted Angel, but now plans to finish her off once she does the job.; Dread (Billy "Sly" Williams) - Andros' lieutenant.; Angel Blake (Valarie Pettiford) - Trivette's ex-girlfriend who is a contract killer contracted by Andros.; Notes: Grand L. Bush, who plays Andros, would play Trivette's brother, Simon, one season later in "Brothers in Arms". He and Clarence Gilyard both appeared in the 1988 film Die Hard but shared no scenes together.; Billy "Sly" Williams, who plays Dread, returns as a pimp named Luther several seasons later in "Saturday Night".
128	22	"The Soul of Winter"	Michael Preece	Gordon T. Dawson	April 25, 1998	523	14.66
Roscoe Jones (Paul Winfield), the minister who replaced Trent's father, is targeted by a former military comrade, Stan Gorman (R. D. Call), who is now the leader of a white supremacy group called the Sons of the Reich. Gorman and his men intended to kill Jones' son, Adam (Carliss Benson)-- who is the best friend of Trent's younger brother, Tommy-- but mistakenly killed another kid named Rodney Summers, as both Adam and Summers were running late for the Sunday morning sermon after delivering food baskets to needy families. Following Summers' murder, the violence and intimidation from Gorman and his men escalates when they vandalize Roscoe's church, terrorize the other congregants, almost abduct Adam and Tommy, and then burn down another church, prompting Roscoe to organize a charity fundraiser for its repairs with Collin Raye headlining the event. In order for Walker, Trivette, Trent and Carlos to bring Gorman to justice for good, they must connect him to Rodney Summers' murder, a goal that hinges on finding the murder weapon. Antagonists: Sons of the Reich: A Neo-Nazi/white supremacist regime based in Dallas. Pastor Roscoe Jones's son, Adam (who is the best friend of Trent's younger brother, Tommy), was sent away for protection after they attempted to kill him. Its known members include: Stan Gorman (R. D. Call) - Leader of the organization. A white supremacist and former Army recruit who is an old enemy to Roscoe, who was convicted of murdering his Army CO. Now free, he is in command of the Neo-Nazi organization and determined to blot out churches that have black pastors, and mistakenly killing another boy instead of Adam.; Spire (Jordan Marder) - Stan Gorman's second-in-command.; Sonny Kline (Shane Hendrix) - Stan Gorman's former cellmate in Huntsville, assassin, facilitator and top enforcer, who rented a farm that serves as the armory for the Sons of the Reich. He was responsible for firing the shot that killed Rodney Summers. The Rangers discovered the rifle used in Rodney Summers' murder in the barn, as it was not located at the Sons of the Reich headquarters during the search warrant execution following the gang's attempted abduction of Adam and Tommy.; Note: R. D. Call, who plays Stan Gorman in this episode, previously portrayed another villain several seasons earlier in "Crime Wave Dave": the titular Dave Kilmer.
129	23	"Circle of Life"	Michael Preece	Nicholas J. Corea	May 2, 1998	521	13.02
Joe Lopez (Danny Trejo), a skillful safecracker and the husband of the Rangers' old friend, Marta Lopez (who previously appeared in "The Covenant" and "The Brotherhood"), has recently been paroled from his 10-15 year sentence (without knowing of the death of his son Ernesto at the hands of a trio of dirty cops in Season 5's "The Brotherhood"), has to spend his parole at a halfway house, and lands a job as a dishwasher at Marta's newly-opened Mexican restaurant, Casa Lopez. However, the halfway house is also home to a group of robbers that Walker and Trivette have been tracking for months prior to Joe being paroled. Following the recent Diamond Mart robbery at the same time Joe checked into the house and was hired at Marta's restaurant, they force Joe into taking part in their next heist. Wanting to stay straight for his family's sake and repair his strained relationship with his surviving son Tommy (who previously appeared in Season 3's "The Covenant"), Joe asks Walker and Trivette for help, and has a plan to help them identify and take down the leader of the group. Antagonists: Buck Coburn (Stephen Macht) - Joe's corrupt parole officer, who aims to use his safe-cracking skills for the violent heist crew he leads. Being a parole officer, he had access to the police scanner during the robberies (to ascertain when law enforcement would arrive and when the criminals needed to escape) and the electronic monitors the parolees living at the halfway house, including Joe, had to wear (the parolees participating in each robbery would leave behind the ankle monitors to prevent authorities from linking them to the heists). He is killed by Walker and Trivette in self-defense after he tried to shoot Tommy (whom he kidnapped for leverage in the heist), only for Joe to take the bullet (Joe luckily made a full recovery afterwards).; Carl Wade (Brad Leland) - Coburn's second-in-command in charge of the halfway house the robbers live in.; JT Hopkins (Bill Wise) and Little John Mulkey (Myke Michaels) - Two parolees residing at the halfway house who were involved in Coburn's robberies. They are killed when a semi-truck collides with their getaway vehicle while they were pursued by Walker and Trivette after a bartender tips them off to their involvement in the Diamond Mart robbery. The explosion was so gruesome, it was hard for the two Rangers to identify their bodies, until Joe provided them the information they needed after he heard about the fatal crash.; Note: Danny Trejo would go on to play another character two seasons later in "Rise to the Occasion": Jose Rodriguez.
130	24	"Test of Faith"	Eric Norris	Bob Gookin	May 9, 1998	524	12.46
A middle school in East Dallas finds itself at the heart of rising gang violence, and when Ricardo Lopez (Billy Gallo), a popular teacher and an old friend of Walker and Trent, is killed for standing up to a gang leader (Emilio Rivera), fear grips the students, especially one student (Jonathan Hernandez) who was the only witness to the crime and was too scared to come forward. Walker goes undercover as a substitute teacher to catch Ricardo's killer, as well as promote the message of standing up to gang influence. However, when Faith Hollister (Rachel Crane), one of Walker's students, starts a campaign to clean up the school, she also becomes a target. Antagonist: Juan "Loco" Morales (Emilio Rivera) - The vicious leader of the Diablos, who is determined to keep a local school in check while running his drug operations, after killing Ricardo Lopez attempting to divert his students from the gang-life. He served 3 years in Huntsville for aggravated assault and attempted murder (Trent found that sentence quite outrageous) before being released 6 months prior to Ricardo's murder. He also killed two of Ricardo's students who belonged to a rival gang a few nights before the murder of the popular teacher and attempted to have Faith killed as an example to maintain fear over the school. Note: Billy Gallo, who plays Ricardo Lopez, previously had a villainous role as George Vickers' right-hand man, Ortiz, earlier in the season in "Iceman".
131	25	"The Wedding: Part 1"	Michael Preece	Gordon T. Dawson	May 16, 1998	525	13.57
In this season-ending cliffhanger, The gang gets ready for Alex's friends Detective Kim Rivers (Lauralee Bell) and ADA Phil Holland's wedding. Walker finally decides to propose to her after, but the wedding is then attacked by a group of hitmen. When the shootout is all over, Walker tries again to propose to Alex, but she is shot by the leader of the hitmen, Karl Storm (Tobin Bell), a man she helped incarcerate five years earlier and who had orchestrated the hit as revenge against those who put him in prison. Antagonist: Karl Storm (Tobin Bell) - A violent arms dealer who seeks revenge against Alex and other key figures at Kim Rivers's wedding.

=== Season 7 (1998–99) ===
- This is the first season to be produced by Norris Bros. Entertainment.

No. overall	No. in season	Title	Directed by	Written by	Original release date	Prod. code	Viewers (millions)
132	1	"The Wedding: Part 2"	Michael Preece	Gordon T. Dawson	September 26, 1998	601	17.30
As Alex lies in the hospital in critical condition, Walker embarks on a quest to find Karl Storm (who wounded Alex at the end of the Season 6 cliffhanger) and bring him to justice. Antagonist: Karl Storm (Tobin Bell) - A violent arms dealer who put Alex in a coma with a bullet intended for Walker.
133	2	"Trackdown"	Jerry Jameson	William T. Conway	October 3, 1998	602	15.17
Walker helps free Hector Lopez (Greg Serano), Det. Carlos Sandoval's nephew-in-law, when he is falsely accused of a crime by his greedy former employer (Brad Leland). Before he can be officially released, Hector learns from his cellmate, Eddie (Ron Harper) that the corrupt guard captain, Paul Kelton (Marc Alaimo), is running a drug-trafficking ring within the prison, and gives Hector evidence of Kelton's corruption to give to Walker and Carlos shortly after he is released. However, Kelton and his men kill Eddie for stealing their evidence and then realize he gave it to Hector after seeing that he witnessed the murder. As such, Hector is forced to escape from the prison and finds himself on the run. Carlos and Walker must protect Hector and bring Kelton and his men to justice. Meanwhile, Alex, after realizing she needs to do more with her life following her recent shooting, opens her Help Our People Excel (HOPE) center to help the less fortunate. Antagonists: Paul Kelton (Marc Alaimo) - The corrupt prison guard captain who is running a drug-trafficking ring inside a prison. He kills Hector's cellmate Eddie for stealing their evidence, and then goes after Hector after realizing Eddie gave it to Hector and witnessed the murder.; Jackson (Cole S. McKay) and Peters (Gary Davis) - Kelton's lieutenants.; Joey Dunbar (Brad Leland) - A former Golden Gloves boxing champ, now an auto shop owner, who is known to fire employees for stealing, which is a false pretense as an excuse to not pay them. After firing and then assaulting Hector Lopez, who then assaulted him in return in determination to get his final pay, he files a false police report about Hector committing armed robbery against him and forces his employees to back up his statement, up until Walker uncovers the truth and the employees get their stories straight.
134	3	"Royal Heist"	Michael Preece	Nicholas Corea	October 10, 1998	603	15.20
Garrett Stone (David Parker), who Walker helped put away years prior, is paroled and resumes his life of crime. Trivette infiltrates his gang to bring him back to justice once again. Meanwhile, Alex and Carlos attempt to help save a youth from gang life. Antagonists: Garrett Stone (David Parker) - A violent armed robber whom Walker once took down, and is now committing a series of heists in the Dallas-Ft. Worth area, where one of them, an undercover FBI agent, is accidentally killed by a uniformed officer responding to one of the heists.; Richard Denardo (Sean McGraw) - The corrupt curator of the Dallas Museum of Modern Art leading the robbery of the Royal Jewels of Kunai.
135	4	"War Cry"	Karl Kases	Nicholas Corea	October 17, 1998	526	12.15
Walker investigates a mystery illness sweeping across the children on his Cherokee reservation from polluted water, and after two children die from said illness, suspicion falls on a nearby factory. When the E.P.A. tests find nothing wrong with the water, Walker must work with Sam Coyote to stop a band of radical Cherokee from waging vigilante justice, and prove that the factory owner (Luke Askew) had rigged the inspection by directing the E.P.A. agents to a water emission pipe that produces actual clean water, but had secretly concealed the real pipe that is dumping the toxins from his factory which Walker intends to find. Antagonists: Roger Dansfield (Luke Askew) - A wealthy factory owner near the Cherokee reservation whose factory has been dumping toxic chemicals into pipe leading to the river, polluting it and causing sickness and death to those who traverse it. He also does not hesitate to have one of two brothers killed for investigating the toxic dumping.; Deke Powell (Dean Norris) - Dansfield's Head of Security and top enforcer.
136	5	"Code of the West"	Michael Preece	Janet A. Wilson and Michael L. Wilson	October 24, 1998	607	15.87
Convicted murder and robber Dirk Morgan (Lindsey "LL" Ginter) escapes from prison seeking retribution against those responsible for putting him there. After Morgan murders the prosecutor and head juror from his case, Walker and Trivette try to stop him before he can murder the trial's judge (Mike Connors), who happens to be on a retreat with his orphaned granddaughter (Amanda Fuller), Alex, C.D., and a group of youths who are the children of convicted felons, including Morgan's own daughter (Camilla Belle). Antagonist: Dirk Morgan (LL Ginter) - A violent armed robber who escaped from prison and is determined to take revenge on all those who had him thrown in prison by hanging them.
137	6	"The Children of Halloween"	João Fernandes	Bob Gookin	October 31, 1998	604	14.17
The Metroplex is hit with a rash of abductions when a Satanic symbol found at each crime scene suggests that children are going to be sacrificed on Halloween by a group of devil worshippers. The investigation kicks off when one of Trent's students (Blake Foster) is abducted after class, and before long, other children get abducted, as well, increasing the urgency of the situation. The stakes run high when Alex is also abducted while trying to stop the cult from taking another child (Elena Hurst) that was given community service at the H.O.P.E. Center for petty theft. Walker, Trivette, Carlos and Trent enlist help from the owner of an occult book store (Downtown Julie Brown) to locate the hideout of the so-called son of Satan and stop the sacrifice before it is too late. Appropriately, this episode aired on Halloween night in 1998 (the only such episode to do so), and had used one of the appropriate Halloween typefaces for the title card credits and end credits as opposed to the traditional Goudy-Old-Style font used since Season 3. Antagonists: David "Lucifer" Thompson (Erik Todd Dellums)- The leader of a Satanist cult who kidnaps young children and Alex for a ritualistic sacrifice on Halloween Night and claims to be the son of Satan. He becomes the victim of his own sacrifice when he is killed during his final fight with Walker.; Belinda "Belial" Jordan (Meagan Mangum) - Thompson's lover and second-in-command.
138	7	"Survival"	Jerry Jameson	Bob Gookin	November 7, 1998	606	16.61
A camping trip turns nightmarish when Alex is kidnapped by a trio of deranged brothers, and the men (Walker, Trivette, Trent, and Carlos) must come to the rescue. But when Trivette is injured during the pursuit, Carlos must get him safely down the mountain, while Walker and Trent continue on to rescue Alex. Antagonists: Dwight (Randall "Tex" Cobb), Buddy (Jan Michael Shultz) and Luke Trammel (John Henry Whitaker) - A trio of brothers in Utah who are mountain men and survivalists skilled in making booby traps, responsible for kidnapping Alex and two other women, turning them into their sex slaves, and killing the local sheriff for trying to prevent Alex's kidnapping.
139	8	"Second Chance"	Christian I. Nyby II	Bruce Cervi and John Lansing	November 14, 1998	608	14.01
Walker and the Rangers find themselves in the middle of an IRA conflict when a former member-- the Rangers' old friend, Adam McGuire-- comes back to Dallas and brings his young daughter, Jennifer (Mika Boorem), for a bone marrow transplant, also becoming friends with her prospective donor (Becket Gremmels). Jennifer is kidnapped by a splinter faction in retaliation for her father's killing one of their members, albeit in self-defense. Walker and Trivette must save Jennifer before either the group or her sickness claim her life. Antagonists: Neal Banyon (Granville Van Dusen)- An IRA terrorist who seeks payback against Adam McGuire for his brother's death by kidnapping McGuire's ailing daughter, Jennifer, and holding her as leverage against him.; Terry McLane (Jan Michael Shultz) - An IRA terrorist who strays from Banyon's mission to seek revenge against Walker after their last encounter left a permanent scar on his face, which ultimately comprised Banyon's operations.; (Note: this episode is tied to the events of the season 4 episode "Flashpoint")
140	9	"Paradise Trail"	Michael Preece	Nicholas Corea	November 21, 1998	605	13.80
To celebrate Walker's birthday, C.D. tells the story of a Hayes Cooper adventure, Mormons and their wagon train must be defended in the Utah wilderness from outlaws. Antagonists: Danny (Mark Collie), Buster (John Anderson) and J.J. Tarpin (Lee Roy Parnell) - A trio of 19th Century outlaw brothers leading a vicious gang in Utah determined to hit a caravan of Mormon settlers.
141	10	"Eyes of a Ranger"	Michael Preece	Story by : Gordon Dawson and Dawn Ritchie; Teleplay by : Gordon Dawson	December 5, 1998	609	15.05
Teenage country music artist Lila McCann plays aspiring singer Kelly Wyman. She is being closely followed by the wealthy and entitled Brad Alt (Sean Kanan) and follows him under the pretense that he will help her launch her career. What she does not know is that he is trying to gain control of the heroin industry in Dallas, and is the focus of a Ranger investigation. When Kelly is sentenced to 300 hours of community service at the H.O.P.E. Center following Brad's botched arrest at the beginning of the episode, plus Walker making a bet with Brad's father, Ramsey (Mack Weston) that he'll turn in his badge if he can't prove his son's illicit activities, it seems as though Walker and Alex just might be the ones to help make her dreams come true. However, Brad continues to stalk her, even after Walker enlists help from Trent to protect Kelly. This episode also featured an appearance by Michael Peterson. Antagonist: Bradley "Brad" Alt (Sean Kanan) - The entitled son of wealthy land developer Ramsey Alt who is running a black tar heroin deal while sabotaging the lifelong dreams of aspiring country singer Kelly Wyman, whom he has had a fixation on. Later after Walker makes a deal with Ramsey by betting his Ranger Badge so Walker can find the drugs in his company building, Ramsey disowns him, having seen his son's actions firsthand during the arrest.
142	11	"On the Border"	Jerry Jameson	Allan Cole	December 12, 1998	610	15.95
A corrupt sheriff (Lee Majors) fakes a drug-related accident to disguise a murder of a trucker who refused to participate in his drug smuggling. But when the boy's mother claims to Alex that he would not have anything to do with drugs, she gets Walker and Trivette to help her investigate. Antagonists: Sheriff Derek Bell (Lee Majors) - A corrupt border town sheriff running drugs across the U.S./Mexico Border using big rig truckers and eliminates those who refuse his offer, even hunting down and trying to kill one who managed to survive.; Deputy Simms (Stuart Greer) - A corrupt border town deputy and Sheriff Bell's top enforcer.
143	12	"Lost Boys"	Rich Thorne	Robin Madden	January 9, 1999	611	16.00
Carlos' nephew, Jesse Estrella (Bernie Guzman), is in trouble with the law when a gun is found in his room. The weapon in question was used by a man named Johnny Blade (Dan Clark) to kill a Dallas detective named Bill Sadler (Gil Glasgow) during a late-night raid on an electronics warehouse, where Blade’s accomplices, all juvenile delinquents, were apprehended by the Rangers and Dallas PD officers. Jesse’s best friend, Bobby Landrum (Chauncey Leopardi), also an accomplice of Blade, had hidden the gun in Jesse’s room in a bout of panic, and when Blade finds out, he kidnaps Jesse's mother, Theresa (Ada Maris), then has his lawyer (Michael Costello) help him force Jesse to take the rap for the crime under the threat of his mother being killed. Worse, Blade opts to have both Jesse and his mother killed (Blade's juvenile accomplices from the warehouse raid doing so to Jesse in juvie, while he does so to Jesse's mother and stages it as a suicide) even after the forced confession, to ensure Jesse never changes his mind. The Estrellas' only hope is for Bobby, who is wracked with guilt for dragging them into the whole mess, to come forward and tell the Rangers the truth in time. Antagonists: John "Johnny" Tyler Blade (Dan Clark) - An Ex-Navy SEAL who owns an arcade as a front for his burglary operations and uses at-risk teens as his recruits.; Zack Conlon (Todd Lowe) - Blade's second-in-command.; Snake (Michael Fishman) - A regular at Blade's arcade and Blade's top enforcer in the juvenile division arrested by the Rangers during the warehouse heist.; Lawrence Patterson (Michael Costello) - A corrupt lawyer working with Blade who pressures Jesse Estrella into signing a forced confession after threatening his mother's life. Later humiliated at a function rewarding him for his community service work when the Rangers were there to arrest him.; Bobby Landrum (Chauncey Leopardi) - Jesse's best friend and a weak-willed arcade regular used by Blade. After Blade murders Dallas police detective Bill Sadler, Bobby is tasked with hiding the murder weapon, which he hides in Jesse's dresser drawer. When Blade demanded that Jesse returned his gun, Carlos and Theresa had already found it first. After Jesse takes the blame for the murder, Bobby eventually cracks under the guilt, makes his way to Ranger HQ and confesses the truth, blowing the lid off of Blade's entire front. He got off easy after Blade, all of his cronies and Patterson are arrested, and was able to fix his friendship with Jesse when the two are sentenced to 300 hours of community service at the H.O.P.E. Center.; Note: Dan Clark is best known as "Nitro" from the hit series American Gladiators
144	13	"Special Witness"	Christian I. Nyby II	Bob Gookin	January 16, 1999	613	16.35
While Alex is in the process of building a case against a notorious mob boss named Morris Foley (Gianni Russo), she, the Rangers, Carlos and Trent befriend a female Special Olympian named Sally (Andrea Fay Friedman) while volunteering with the Texas Special Olympics. With other witnesses recanting their testimonies against Foley, Trent is the only one brave enough to take the stand, and if he doesn't, Alex has no case to build. When Trent volunteers to take Sally to running practice while her mother has to go on a job interview, he is attacked and stabbed by a federally-wanted assassin named Donovan Riggs (Gary Busey). With Sally being the sole witness to Trent's stabbing, Walker, Trivette, Alex and Carlos enlist her help to catch Riggs in order to prove that Foley hired him to prevent Trent from testifying, but she becomes Foley's next target when she is surprisingly successful in identifying Riggs in a police sketch. While praying for Trent to get discharged in time for Foley's trial, Walker, Trivette and Carlos must apprehend Riggs before he can kill Sally, all while preparing her for her competition in San Antonio. Antagonists: Morris Foley (Gianni Russo) - A crime lord who hires Riggs to kill Trent (who is a witness to his criminal activities), Sally (for witnessing Riggs stab Trent and providing the composite sketch of the former) and the police sketch artist, Gloria Doran.; Donovan Riggs (Gary Busey) - A Chicago-based federally-wanted freelance assassin hired to kill many people, including Trent Malloy, Sally and Gloria Doran. He killed up to 24 people (the other 23 likely came from Chicago, but while Trent narrowly avoided being his 24th, Doran filled that role after Sally identified him). Upon being arrested by Walker before he could kill Sally and Carlos (which eventually resulted in a guilty verdict for Foley), he was likely extradited back to Chicago to face murder charges after his and Foley's trials in Texas concluded.
145	14	"The Principal"	Jerry Jameson	Nicholas Corea	February 6, 1999	612	15.48
A principal of a high school (Morgan Stevens), who is an old friend of Walker, has his suspicions about a faculty member who is supplying drugs and is murdered when he accidentally witnesses the exchange between a teacher (James Remar) and a student after the Rangers busted the Head of Security who was thought to be the ringleader. When the corrupt teacher tries to disguise the principal's death as a suicide, Walker and Trivette believe otherwise and go undercover as the new Principal and Head of Security to find those responsible. The Power Team guest stars in this episode. Antagonist: Keith Bolt (James Remar) - An Ex-Navy SEAL who is the work shop teacher at a school, and is running a drug ring within the school using some of the students, and kills the school principal who discovered his dealings.
146	15	"Team Cherokee: Part 1"	Michael Preece	Bruce Cervi and John Lansing	February 13, 1999	614	14.26
The Rangers investigate a series of suspicious crashes involving a Cherokee Indian racing team that are being caused by Team Forbes, a rival team that wants to put them out of the race for good. Meanwhile, Trent and Carlos search for a kidnapped young girl (Sara Hickman) and rescue her from a pedophile. Antagonists: Freddy Forbes (Muse Watson) - The wealthy owner of Forbes Racing who is determined to remove Team Cherokee from the races, tampering with Brian Falcon's car to cause an accident.; Joseph Ironhorse (Byron Chief-Moon) - A pit crew member for Team Cherokee who is aiding Forbes primarily due to the fact that he wanted to be the driver in place of Brian Falcon.; Mel Burnett (Lynn Mathis) - A pedophile who kidnapped a young girl and forced her into his child pornography art.
147	16	"Team Cherokee: Part 2"	Michael Preece	Bruce Cervi and John Lansing	February 20, 1999	615	15.23
When Brian Falcon (Michael Greyeyes) is injured in a racing crash caused by the No. 2 man on Team Cherokee (Byron Chief-Moon) who secretly betrayed the team out of jealousy over being passed over as the driver, Walker, who had prior experience with racing, is asked to drive their NASCAR stock car as a replacement driver. This forces Team Forbes to try to destroy Team Cherokee's car before the next race. Meanwhile, after uncovering the evidence that would convict a young girl's kidnapper and molester (Lynn Mathis), Trent's car is stolen with the evidence, promoting the Rangers to search for the thieves to recover the evidence. Antagonists: Freddy Forbes (Muse Watson) - The wealthy owner of Forbes Racing who is determined to remove Team Cherokee from the races, tampering with Brian Falcon's car to cause an accident.; Joseph Ironhorse (Byron Chief-Moon) - A pit crew member for Team Cherokee who is aiding Forbes primarily due to the fact that he wanted to be the driver in place of Brian Falcon.; Mel Burnett (Lynn Mathis) - A pedophile who kidnapped a young girl and forced her into his child pornography art.; Carjacking ring - A group of thieves that steals luxury cars. Their actions were first noticed by the rangers when one of their members Lois DiNardo (Amanda Welles) had stolen Trent's car with the evidence against Burnett hidden underneath the seat.; Note: This is Jimmy Wlceck and Marco Sanchez's final appearances as Trent Malloy and Carlos Sandoval in the series, with neither of them being seen or mentioned again afterwards as they were transferred to the lead role in the series Sons of Thunder, a short-lived Walker spinoff.
148	17	"livegirls.now"	Jerry Jameson	Bruce Cervi and John Lansing	February 27, 1999	617	14.19
Trivette's girlfriend, Kristin (Gretchen Palmer) disappears and pictures of her surface on an Internet site, with details that suggests that she is to be sold in a sex-slavery auction with other missing girls. He and Walker then have only a few days to find her before she is sold. Antagonists: John Harris (Philip Casnoff) - The mastermind behind a sex trafficking ring who kidnapped Kristin and many other women to sell to the highest bidder, as well as a prince.; Iverson (Larry Joshua) - A subordinate of Harris who usually can't resist toying with the women, much to Harris's ire, as he wants to ensure their clients want them unblemished. In doing so, he almost had his hand cut off.; Styles (Bruce DuBose) - A subordinate of Harris.; Rolf Gaines (Christian Meoli) - The model photographer involved in Harris's operation. As Trivette was there when the photo of Kristin used on the Internet was taken, it was enough for Walker to go and question him, resulting in his arrest. Under threat of the death penalty should any of the women turn up dead, he cooperates and gives Walker, Trivette and Alex the code needed to infiltrate the online auction in order for them to track down the slavers.; Bruno (Christopher Dahlberg) - The security officer at Rolf's studio. When Walker interrogates Rolf and then takes him into custody when his suspicions about Kristin's kidnapping are confirmed, he is also arrested for interfering with the interrogation.; Notes: Philip Casnoff, who portrays Mr. Harris, the leader of the sex slave ring, is married to Roxanne Hart, who portrays Caroline Whitman, Maisie Whitman's traitorous former daughter-in-law and the villain of "Mind Games".
149	18	"No Way Out"	Eric Norris	Bruce Cervi and John Lansing	April 24, 1999	616	13.71
Caleb Hooks, an old enemy of Walker's (from Season 4's "The Avenger"), continues to seek revenge for the death of his brother Randall...this time by imprisoning Alex and Trivette in a gradually-filling water tank. Trivette and Alex reminisce about Walker's past adventures, while waiting to be rescued, and also so Trivette can celebrate his birthday. Antagonist: Caleb Hooks - A mercenary and an old enemy to Walker who has kidnapped Alex and Trivette and placed Walker in yet another cat-and-mouse game as part of his revenge. Notes: This was the first episode aired on CBS since Sons of Thunder, a spinoff of WTR, ended its six-episode run.; Michael Parks makes the second of his two appearances as "Caleb Hooks" on WTR. (This time, Hooks doesn't even get a fight scene; he just misses what should have been an easy shot at Walker, who then picks him right off.)
150	19	"Brothers in Arms"	Eric Norris	Nicholas Corea	May 1, 1999	618	13.02
Simon Trivette, Jimmy's estranged brother, is arrested by the Rangers. They learn from Simon that he is in deep cover and that there's a murder contract out on Jimmy. Antagonist: Victor Darden - A dangerous drug lord who attempts to assassinate Trivette using his older brother, Simon. Notes: Grand L. Bush, who plays Simon Trivette, previously played the villain of "Angel", Andros, one season earlier.; This episode is dedicated to the memory of creative consultant Nicholas Corea (1943–99), who died of pancreatic cancer after filming was completed.
151	20	"Mind Games"	Michael Preece	Robin Madden	May 8, 1999	621	12.83
While Walker and Trivette are busy going after an escaped convict and find that he had been hired for some kind of job involving a bank robber on death row, C.D. notices some strange occurrences revolving around the death of Brian Whitman (Robin Thomas), the son of his friend Maisie Whitman (whom C.D. met while undercover at the Quiet Rest nursing home in Season 6's "Forgotten People"). Suspecting foul play, C.D. decides to investigate, eventually learning that Maisie’s daughter-in-law, Caroline (Roxanne Hart), and Brian’s best friend, Peter (David Allen Brooks), had engaged in an affair and plotted to steal Brian's trust fund. Caroline and Peter had murdered Brian after he uncovered their plans, and then plot to get Maisie out of the way-- either by institutionalizing or killing her-- so they have full control of the funds. Antagonists: Caroline Whitman (Roxanne Hart) - Maisie's daughter-in-law who is secretly plotting to steal the family's trust fund and kills her husband after he discovers her plans, and drugs Maisie to gain control over her. When CD finds out, she was willing to have both him and Maisie killed, but Walker and Trivette stopped her, thanks to a concerned Alex alerting them to the situation, earning her a one-way ticket to Gatesville.; Peter (David Allen Brooks) - Brian's former best friend and Caroline's lover who helped her in the plot to steal Brian's trust fund and institutionalize or kill Maisie.; Frank Hillman (Hank Stone) - A bank robber and murderer Alex convicted for a death sentence who gets a re-trial, and hires Sutherland to kill Jorge Garcia, the only witness against him.; Brice Sutherland (Brian Tubbert) - A murderous biker and Frank Hillman's cellmate who escapes from Huntsville to kill a witness as a favor for Hillman in exchange for a big payday.; Arnie Freeman (Cliff Stephens) - A gun dealer suspected of supplying weapons to Sutherland.; Notes: Roxanne Hart is married to Philip Casnoff, who portrayed another villain a few episodes earlier: Mr. Harris in "livegirls.now".; David Allen Brooks previously portrayed the leader of drug dealers that attacked the Ranger Teen Camp in Season 5's "Last Hope".; Hank Stone, who portrays Frank Hillman, previously portrayed Jack Garrett's (Patrick St. Esprit) lieutenant, Jake Reed, one season earlier in "The Fighting McClains". He and Patrick St. Esprit would share another episode two seasons later in "Unsafe Speed", where he portrays a biker named Tramp and St. Esprit portrays a drug kingpin named Darby.
152	21	"Power Angels"	Eric Norris	Story by : Leslie Pike; Teleplay by : Bruce Cervi and John Lansing	May 15, 1999	620	10.69
A loan shark, with minister's son under his thumb, attempts to steal a charitable telethon's proceeds, and Walker must stop him and save the boy while he and Trivette meet their match with two competitive German policemen in an international competition for law enforcement officers. Antagonists: Earl McMartin (Terry Lester) - A loan shark and owner of a construction company who wants to secure a debt repayment from minister Thornton Power's son Preston by robbing the telethon's charity funds and also kills one of his clients, former Dallas Cowboys quarterback Darren Kelvie, who refused to pay his debts. Preston is shot by one of McMartin's henchmen afterwards and survives.; Robert Jackson (Dimitri Diatchenko) - McMartin's lieutenant.; Notes: The last scene of this episode leads directly into the next episode, "Jacob's Ladder" after Trivette receives a call about a gang shooting.; Kai Wulff, who portrays Cosmo Von Deusenberg, one of the two German law enforcement officers Walker and Trivette competed against, previously portrayed Steven "The Viper" Jamieson two seasons earlier in "The Deadliest Man Alive".
153	22	"Jacob's Ladder"	Michael Preece	Janet A. Wilson and Michael L. Wilson	May 15, 1999	619	13.44
After Walker and Trivette receive a call about a gang shooting at the end of the previous episode, Alex's attempt to prosecute the gang leader responsible is having some difficulty when his gang starts using fear tactics with arson to prevent the witnesses from testifying. However, it gets out of hand when Metro Fire Captain Jacob Crossland (John Schneider), whose young son (Michael Welch) was given 300 hours of community service at the H.O.P.E. Center for spray-painting cars, denounces their act as cowardly on the news, and the gang responds by attacking the firefighters during their next attack, during which Jacob is shot and severely injured after rescuing a man from the fire. It's up to Walker and Trivette to stop the gang before anyone else gets hurt. Antagonists: The Firelake Bloods - A ruthless Dallas-area gang that's been using arson as a scare tactic to maintain control of their neighborhood. One of its leaders is Edmundo "Loco" Chavez, who had been arrested by Walker and Trivette for killing a young man for refusing to join the gang, prompting the other members to retaliate by intimidating witnesses (almost burning down the H.O.P.E. Center in the process, at which point Walker and Trivette finally took them down for good). Chavez also sanctioned an attack on the firefighters themselves as retaliation for being denounced as cowardly by Captain Crossland. The gang badly wounded Crossland during one of their arson attacks, but he made a full recovery after they were all incarcerated.
154	23	"In Harm's Way: Part 1"	Jerry Jameson	Story by : Gordon T. Dawson and Nicholas Corea; Teleplay by : Gordon T. Dawson	May 22, 1999	622	11.86
In this season-ending cliffhanger, a wealthy Dallas family and staff are murdered by a group of masked men as an example. This was part of a larger plan that was meant to extort millions of dollars from other wealthy families. Meanwhile, when evidence is uncovered that could send the mastermind of these crimes to death row, a twin-engine plane carrying Ranger Walker and his fiancée, Alex Cahill, crashes into a lake after it was shot down by a World War II-era plane. A North American P-51 D Mustang. Antagonists: Thomas "Mr. O" Openshaw (Stephen McHattie) - The mastermind behind a series of grizzly home invasion murders against wealthy families as part of his extortion operation. He also personally rapes and kills a girl taken hostage.; Cole Hatch (Clayton Landey) - A security expert & top lieutenant of Mr. O, whom he hired to disable state-of-the-art systems for Zink and his crew and to kill Walker and Alex to prevent the evidence against his boss from being brought to trial.; Zink (Mike Rad) - A psychotic murderer who Mr. O hired to break into homes to butcher wealthy folks and film the killings, along with the assault on C.D. at his bar.; J.T. Brody (Sam Hennings) - A combat pilot who was hired by Hatch to shoot down the plane carrying Alex and Walker to prevent them from presenting evidence at Openshaw's trial.

=== Season 8 (1999–2000) ===
No. overall	No. in season	Title	Directed by	Written by	Original release date	Prod. code	Viewers (millions)
155	1	"In Harm's Way: Part 2"	Jerry Jameson	Story by : Gordon T. Dawson and Nicholas Corea; Teleplay by : Gordon T. Dawson	September 25, 1999	623	13.88
In this concluding episode from the Season 7 cliffhanger, Walker and Alex survive a plane crash and end up on an island with critical evidence of a mass murder spree killer in their hands and a group of mercenaries sent in to kill them. As Trivette and search and rescue are busy trying to locate them, they are unaware the pilot they initially asked to locate them is actually the one who shot down the plane and purposely misdirected them. It is now a race against time for Walker and Alex to be rescued before the murderer is set free and flees the country. Antagonists: Thomas "Mr. O" Openshaw (Stephen McHattie) - The mastermind behind a series of grizzly home invasion murders against wealthy families as part of his extortion operation. He also personally rapes and kills a girl taken hostage. As soon as the evidence against him is presented in court and two of his accomplices-- who'd been arrested by Trivette-- had agreed to testify against him, he is later sent to death row for his crimes.; Cole Hatch (Clayton Landey) - A security expert & top lieutenant of Mr. O whom he hired to disable state-of-the-art systems for Zink and his crew and to kill Walker and Alex to prevent the evidence against his boss from being brought to trial. After Brody's retreat, while arguing with the latter about returning to the island, they were found out and arrested by Trivette. He and Brody agreed to testify against Openshaw in exchange for leniency, which meant life in prison without parole.; J.T. Brody (Sam Hennings) - The combat pilot hired to prevent Walker and Alex from presenting evidence at Openshaw's trial. Later provided false information when asked to locate Walker and Alex to slip a team in to finish them off on a Huey before being driven off by Walker when the Huey was damaged. Later after Trivette and search and rescue found evidence of the plane shot down from the ammo found at the wreck, Brody was arrested by Trivette when he went to meet Brody to learn more about the ammo and saw him meeting with Hatch along with the damage to the Huey which contradicted his earlier report. He and Hatch agreed to testify against Openshaw in exchange for leniency.; Slade (Michael H. Moss) - The mercenary leader hired by Hatch to hunt down Walker and Alex.
156	2	"Countdown"	Michael Preece	Bob Gookin	October 2, 1999	701	12.33
Terrorists plan an urban release of anthrax in 48 hours, sending Walker and Trivette into action to stop them. They recruit Rangers Francis Gage and Sydney Cooke to help. Antagonists: Roger Woodson (J. Kenneth Campbell) - A former CIA Agent now leading a terrorist cell in threatening to release anthrax over Dallas in exchange for the release of several prisoners, including his younger brother.; Geary (Bruce Carey) - Woodson's tactical technician and second-in-command.; Arthur Woodson (Eddie Braun) - A former CIA Agent and Roger's younger brother.; Note: Although Sydney Cook (Nia Peeples) and Francis Gage (Judson Mills) appear in the credits of this season's opener, this episode is the first in which they are actually introduced.
157	3	"Safe House"	Jerry Jameson	Bruce Cervi and John Lansing	October 9, 1999	702	12.88
Gage and Sydney protect an accountant along with his wife & daughter, so he can testify at the trial of a crime boss who wants him and his family dead. Gage & Sydney manage to foil two separate attempts on the accountant and his family before making it to a safe house with a built-in panic room. However the accountant's wife mistakenly calls her mother to let her know they are alright (despite being warned earlier not to), alerting the mob boss to the safe house's location. Antagonists: Vincent "Vince" Termin (David Groh) - A crime lord whom Walker and Trivette once sought to capture, who now targets his former accountant and his family.; Scully (Kevin Casey) - Terman's hitman and top enforcer.
158	4	"Way of the Warrior"	Michael Preece	Story by : Guy Prevost; Teleplay by : Guy Prevost, Bruce Cervi and John Lansing	October 16, 1999	703	13.24
An Indian shaman transports Walker back to the 19th century to prevent a recurrence of a 20th-century injustice. Antagonists: Lester Stahl (Rex Linn) - A corrupt land developer who kills a journalist (John Swasey) in a dispute and tries to blame John Wolf (Steve Reevis) for the murder.; Sheriff Leland Stahl (also portrayed by Rex Linn) - Lester's great-great grandfather, who is a corrupt 19th Century Sheriff responsible for murdering a federal agent with the help of Apache Warriors and pinning it on Lone Wolf (also portrayed by Steve Reevis), who is the great-great grandfather of John Wolf.
159	5	"Tall Cotton"	Michael Preece	Bob Gookin	October 23, 1999	705	12.22
Sydney and Gage go undercover in a bar to locate Gage's reporter sister who had gone missing working on a story regarding the bar's owner. Meanwhile, Walker and Alex's romantic camping trip is interrupted by a lost Boy Scout troop. Antagonists: B.J. Ronson (Frank Stallone) - A crime boss and owner of the titular nightclub who kidnaps and tortures Gage's journalist sister Julie who infiltrated the club as a waitress in order to uncover his illegal operations and had hidden evidence she uncovered which Ronson intends to find.; Slater (Roger Callard) - Ronson's lieutenant.; Notes: Frank Stallone, who portrays the villain of this episode, BJ Ronson, would later portray an ally of the Rangers' one season later in "Saturday Night".; Stuart Pankin, who portrays scout leader Stanley Chamberlain, was cast in the 1981 Chuck Norris film An Eye for an Eye.
160	6	"The Lynn Sisters"	Christian I. Nyby II	Rob Wright	October 30, 1999	706	12.22
The Lynn sisters (who play themselves in this episode) are set to headline a benefit concert for the H.O.P.E. Center at CD's Bar and Grill, a gesture of gratitude toward the Rangers after they busted their former record producer (Peter Webster) for pirating their merchandise. En route to a gig in San Antonio, however, their tour bus is ambushed by a team of mercenaries hired by two brothers (Rick Cramer and Rob Youngblood) who run a major record bootlegging operation. The attackers murder the sisters' two roadies and music manager (Burton Gilliam)—a former service buddy of C.D.'s—and abduct the singers, all as part of a scheme by the brothers to drive up sales of their illegal recordings. When CD doesn't hear back from his old friend, the Rangers are on the case to find the kidnappers. Antagonists: Ringo (Rick Cramer) and Stephan Washburn (Rob Youngblood) - Two brothers and co-owners of Burnin' Records who are running a record bootlegging ring who kidnap the Lynn Sisters in an effort to expand their sales. They also killed their secretary by planting a bomb in their building. Ringo had also been expelled from high school at age 18 for drug trafficking.; Brock (Erik Estrada) - An internationally-wanted mercenary working for the Washburn Brothers and Khan. He and his team are hired by the Washburns to abduct the Lynn Sisters, which begins with murdering the sisters' manager and two roadies before disposing of the tour bus with their bodies still inside. Numerous countries have targeted him for prosecution, and possible execution, and Alex was more than willing to allow the State Department to extradite him if he didn't cooperate after he and his group were arrested. Under this pressure following the arrest, he agrees to cooperate, revealing the Washburns' hideout location in Jacksboro.; Kahn (Daniel Dae Kim) - A criminal who conspires with the Washburn brothers to kidnap the Lynn sisters in an effort to expand their sales.; Bushmaster (George Marshall Ruge) - The sniper in Brock’s crew who disables the Lynn Sisters’ tour bus by shooting out its front tires and is directly responsible for killing the two roadies. He was later arrested by the Rangers when they finally track down Brock.; Unnamed Mercenary (Gene Hartline) - One of Brock's enforcers responsible for the Lynns' kidnapping. He personally murders the sisters' manager, Frank (Gilliam), but beforehand, Frank manages to tear off one of his earrings. When the Rangers find the hijacked bus with the victims' bodies still inside, they discover Frank is still clutching the earring, which became a vital clue for the Rangers in arresting him and the rest of Brock's crew.; Harry (Peter Webster) - The Lynn Sisters' former record producer who had been pirating their goods. His arrest was what prompted Alex and CD to have the Lynns perform at the Bar and Grill in a benefit concert for the H.O.P.E. Center.
161	7	"Suspicious Minds"	Jerry Jameson	Story by : Bob Gookin & Anne Dremann; Teleplay by : Bob Gookin	November 6, 1999	709	12.05
The deaf daughter of an Elvis impersonator witnesses the murder of an undercover cop by a mob boss's underlings, necessitating the Rangers' protection until the boss can be captured. Antagonists: Sonny Tantero (Joe Penny) - A mob boss running a series of rackets whom Walker and Trivette is investigating. He uncovers and kills one of his men, who is revealed to be an undercover police officer working with the Rangers, and then to sets out to kill a deaf little girl who had witnessed the murder.; Rico Castillo (Vic Polizos) - Tantero's lieutenant.
162	8	"Widow Maker"	Jerry Jameson	Gordon T. Dawson	November 13, 1999	704	12.23
With the community gearing up for its first rodeo for charity, a rancher (Barry Corbin) targets Trivette, after Trivette accidentally killed his youngest son, who had tried to sexually assault a female rider (Allison Lange). But after bull rider Ty Murray (who plays himself in this episode) is injured in one of the revenge attempts against Trivette and the victim of the assault, Walker must take his place to ride a dangerous bull known as the Widow Maker. Antagonists: Ben Crowder - A rancher seeking revenge against Trivette and others after his youngest son Buddy is killed resisting arrest. He shares a similar grudge against Walker for busting his brother for land fraud and this hate along with his stubbornness caused him to disregard the truth and delusively believe it was part of a plot to bring down his family.; Zack Crowder - Ben Crowder's oldest son, who helps his father seek revenge against Trivette and other for the accidental death of his younger brother Buddy during the course of arrest.
163	9	"Fight or Die"	Michael Preece	Gordon T. Dawson	November 20, 1999	710	12.89
A deep-cover cop is killed while investigating a prize fighting tournament inside an Arkansas prison. The Governor of Arkansas calls in the Texas Rangers, since it will be easier for out-of-state lawmen to maintain an undercover status. Trivette (as a guard), Walker and Gage (both as convicts) must have time to discover that the warden (Charles Napier) is behind this brawling-for-dollars ring...before the warden's leading undefeated Champion (UFC legend Frank Shamrock) gives Walker and Gage the fight of their lives. Antagonists: Warden Kyle (Charles Napier) - The corrupt Warden of Copperhead Penitentiary who arranges underground fights within the prison in which many undercover cops are murdered.; Lt. Tracton (Marshall R. Teague) - The corrupt Chief of Guards of Copperhead Penitentiary and Warden Kyle's top enforcer who snuffs out undercover cops in the prison via Hammer.; Sandrine (Lennie Loftin) - A corrupt prison guard who is Lt. Tracton's assistant.; Dirk "The Hammer" Savage (Frank Shamrock) - The undefeated Champion and executioner of Copperhead Penitentiary in the underground prison fight who is known to kill undercover cops that Lt. Tracton hands over to him.; King (Cliff Emmich) - A corrupt ring announcer.; Unnamed Prison Doctor (Tom Byrne) - A corrupt doctor who announces the deaths of undercover cops.
164	10	"Rise to the Occasion"	Eric Norris	Bob Gookin	November 27, 1999	707	13.59
Sydney poses as a singer to investigate a corrupt club owner (Steven Bauer), while Walker seeks to end the conditions that led to a middle-schooler's (Paul Robert Langdon) suicide. Antagonists: Lorenzo Cabral (Steven Bauer) - A club owner who is known to purchase stolen items and military-grade weapons, and punishes those who try to skim him.; Reynaldo (Nicholas Celozzi) - Cabral's lieutenant.; Flaco - The gang leader whose actions at the middle school, had caused Henry Monroe to take his own life.; Note: Danny Trejo, who previously played Joe Lopez two seasons earlier in "Circle of Life", portrays Jose Rodriguez in this episode.
165	11	"Full Recovery"	Clarence Gilyard Jr.	Bruce Cervi and John Lansing	December 11, 1999	708	11.18
When Brad Roberts (Scott Weinger), an employee of a genetic research facility finds sarin nerve gas there, he enlists his younger brother Danny (Scott Bailey) to help get a sample of the gas to the authorities, which backfires and results in Brad's death and Danny being left badly hurt and with amnesia. Danny needs the rangers' protection from the company's mercenaries, led by the head of security (Jerome Butler), until he can regain his memories to identify the assailants, as the owner of the facility (Jon Cypher) plans to use the gas at an upcoming military air show in an act of revenge against the military's top brass, whom he blames for his son's suicide (which came about after the son was blamed for causing his men's deaths during a military operation). Antagonists: Waylon Cox, Sr. (Jon Cypher) - CEO of Cox Genetics who plans to release a sarin nerve agent during a military airshow as revenge for his son being disgraced into suicide, and is also known to sell the nerve agents to 3rd world dictators. Shortly after his head of security, Rader, leaves for Camp Stuart to execute the attack, he kills himself to avoid arrest when Walker, Gage and Sydney raid the lab after Danny regains his memories.; Raymond Rader (Jerome Butler) - Cox's Head of Security and top enforcer who kills Brad Roberts after he and his brother, Danny stole some of the nerve gas to hand over to the authorities. After killing Brad, he then tries to do the same thing to Danny after he takes off with the nerve gas and gives it to the Rangers. He tried killing Danny by running him off the edge of a cliff (resulting in his amnesia), but Sydney came to his rescue while she was out on a jog. After Cox kills himself to avoid arrest, he is later apprehended at Camp Stuart by Walker, Sydney and Gage and the sarin was removed from the truck before it detonated.
166	12	"A Matter of Faith"	Michael Preece	Bruce Cervi and John Lansing	December 18, 1999	712	12.34
The Rangers investigate a rash of armored car robberies by a gang whose members dress as Santa Claus. Elsewhere, at a church where ex-gang members worship, the Christmas donations are stolen by current gang-members; the church pastor is accidentally injured during the robbery and winds up in a coma. The pastor's protégé, an ex-gang member, threatens to throw his life away by hunting down those responsible. Antagonists: Felipe Rivas (Val Lauren) - A gang leader who robs a church of Christmas donations and accidentally puts the church's pastor in a coma.; Santa Heist Crew - A group of armored car robbers dressed as Santa Claus. They also have a female member whose job is to create a distraction around law enforcement and security detail by pretending to have her baby stroller out of control with a fake baby inside to help pull off the robbery, something that resulted in her being knocked out by Sydney, once Sydney learns the truth about her connection to the gang.; Notes: At the end of this episode, WTR's entire cast and crew break the fourth wall to wish everyone Happy Holidays.; This episode marks Noble Willingham's final appearance on the series. CD Parker would only be mentioned again several times for the remainder of the series.
167	13	"Vision Quest"	Jerry Jameson	Rob Wright	January 8, 2000	711	12.23
Just as Walker and Alex decide to get engaged, Walker is temporarily blinded by a bomb during an attempt on his life. While Walker learns to cope with this disability, the other Rangers seek out those responsible. Antagonists: Frank Aziz (Endre Hules) - A crime boss who plots to kill the Rangers at C.D.'s Bar & Grill as payback for his rackets being taken down, but winds up blinding Walker instead.; Gazal (Adoni Maropis) - Aziz's lieutenant who was hired to plant the bomb to kill the Rangers at C.D.'S Bar & Grill, although the bomb only ends up temporarily blinding Walker.; Note: The opening credits are modified for the remainder of the season, following Noble Willingham's departure from the series.
168	14	"A Matter of Principle"	Eric Norris	Janet A. Wilson and Michael L. Wilson	January 15, 2000	713	14.37
A retired Texas Ranger (Robert Fuller) joins Walker in the pursuit of those who shot his daughter during a jewelry store robbery. Antagonists: Lester Rawlins (Patrick St. Esprit) - The leader of a violent jewelry store heist crew, who is known to fire random shots through the stores as part of their getaway; one of these instances injures the daughter of Ranger Harper.; Krebs (John McCalmont) - Rawlins' lieutenant.; Alexander "Spike" Riley (Steve Kelso) - Another one of Rawlins' henchmen; when he returns to his house, he sees Wade talking with Walker on his front porch and he fires an Uzi to kill both of them, although they miss. He tried to kill Wade because he was a witness to the first robbery and he identified his tattoo on his arm. He was killed in a car accident while trying to evade Walker in a high speed chase.
169	15	"Thunderhawk"	Mike Norris	Story by : Rob Wright and Reuben Leder; Teleplay by : Rob Wright	February 5, 2000	714	10.97
The head of security of a research lab (Jude Ciccolella) steals a powerful sonic arm laser cannon from his employers while en route to have it transported to a military base and plans to sell it to a group of Middle Eastern terrorists whose leader (David Ackert) had vowed revenge following the death of his father and plotted to launch an attack on Washington, D.C., but they subsequently have it stolen from them by a group of robbers the Rangers were already chasing. Antagonists: Samuel Becker (Jude Ciccolella) - Formerly the head of security of a research lab and the mastermind behind the hijacking of a powerful laser called the Thunderhawk who intends to sell it to terrorists for $50 million.; James Jackson (Clifton Powell) - One of the security guards at the research lab and Becker's accomplice in the robbery. His distrust of Becker's planned sale of the Thunderhawk to Faisal is proven when he learns of Faisal's plan to eliminate the U.S. Government, resulting in Nor killing him when Jackson objects to it.; Deke (Billy Rieck) - The leader of an electronics heist ring with a knack for using grenades who finds himself caught in the middle of the Thunderhawk heist.; Sheik Ali Faisal (David Ackert) - Leader of a Middle Eastern Terrorist cell called the Black Talon looking to buy the Thunderhawk and launch an attack on Washington, D.C. His father was likely the leader of the Black Talon before him, and he is seeking revenge for his death after NATO took out one of his chemical plants.; Nor (Hank Baumert) - Faisal's second-in-command.
170	16	"Justice Delayed"	Michael Preece	John Lansing & Bruce Cervi	February 12, 2000	715	11.53
Seeking to prove her father (Roger Mosley) innocent of murder, a female student (Tammy Townsend) gets Trivette to help. Meanwhile, registering for their wedding shows Alex a part of Walker she'd not seen before. Antagonists: Victor "Vic" Russo (Michael D. Russo) - A crime boss who frames Fred Carter for murder and seeks to close any potential alibis that could get him exonerated by trying to kill a witness who could corroborate Fred's alibi.; Breen (Brent Sexton) - Russo's lieutenant.; Note: This episode marks Marta Lopez's final appearance in the show.
171	17	"The Day of Cleansing"	Christian I. Nyby II	Story by : John Lansing and Bruce Cervi; Teleplay by : Gordon Dawson	February 19, 2000	716	15.47
In this crossover episode, which continued from the Martial Law episode "Honor Among Strangers", Walker comes back from Los Angeles with Sammo Law (Sammo Hung) to track down the white supremacist Cliff Eagleton (David Keith), whom they had caught but had later escaped custody. To help determine Eagleton's next target, Sydney and Gage go undercover to gather information, with Gage infiltrating Eagleton's hate group and Sydney going to a ranch owned by the man who is financing Eagleton's operations. Antagonists: Cliff Eagleton (David Keith) - The leader of a White Supremacist cell the Freedom Brigade and an ex-military officer looking to unleash a terrorist attack on Dallas. He also killed Texas Ranger Forester and three Dallas PD officers before he planned a terrorist attack on foreign businesses in LA with stolen stinger missiles with the help of military sympathizers, where he also murdered Lieutenant P.K. Garrett, a female officer who befriended Sammo (as seen in Martial Law) until his eventual capture by Sammo and Walker. Upon extradition by Walker back to Dallas, he escapes US Marshal custody to reconvene with his followers and carry on his cleansing, now plotting to use trucks with specialized bombs that can't be disarmed, which are activated by pulling the loop inside the cab and are set to detonate in four minutes. While his followers were being arrested, he drove one of the trucks into Dallas with Sydney inside of it (after she was captured due to her cover being blown), but shortly after activating the bomb, he was killed by Walker in self-defense. After Walker and Sammo rescue Sydney, they were able to drive the truck away from Dallas and into a clearing before it exploded.; Rankin (Alan Davidson) - Eagleton's second-in-command of the Freedom Brigade.; Ron Mott (Matthew Posey) - A sniper for the Freedom Brigade who killed the three Dallas officers and Ranger Forester, then helped Eagleton escape US Marshal custody. He has a sister named Gloria who is married to a man by the name of Benny Tumwater.; Linus Harding (Michael Costello) - The owner of a ranch who is financing Eagleton's operations. While Eagleton escapes the ranch in one of his trucks (with Sydney inside it after she was captured), he is apprehended along with the other terrorists after Walker, Trivette and Sammo raid the ranch.
172	18	"Black Dragons"	Michael Preece	Douglas Heyes Jr. & Rob Wright	February 26, 2000	717	13.71
Gage is assaulted by the son (Byron Mann) of a Chinese diplomat (Mako), who is protected by diplomatic immunity. However, when Gage reveals he overheard the son talking about a drug shipment, the Rangers start a new investigation, when they believe that it's connected to the deaths of several students and gang members. Antagonists: Master Ko (Cary-Hiroyuki Tagawa) - A crime boss working with P.K. Song in running a black dot heroin smuggling operation.; P.K. Song (Byron Mann) - The son of Chinese Diplomat Edward Song who is in league with Master Ko in the black dot heroin game, but is protected by diplomatic immunity. Ultimately stripped of his immunity when his father found out the truth and agreed to revoke it as a means to punish P.K. for his actions.; Luke and Dexter Warley (Deron McBee and Wiley Pickett, respectively)- Two brothers who have dealings with Master Ko in the black dot heroin game.
173	19	"Soldiers of Hate"	Jerry Jameson	Leslie Pike	March 18, 2000	718	9.26
The Texas Rangers must stop a white supremacist group from destroying a Unity Festival. Meanwhile, Gage finds out that a little boy (Robert Bailey Jr.) is being tempted towards gang life by his brother's (Norris Young) influence and decides to be a positive role model to help steer him away from it. Antagonists: Travis Braxton (Judson Scott) - The founder & leader of a Fallbrook, Idaho-based white supremacist faction called the Soldiers of the New Millennium looking to launch a coordinated attack in the Metroplex during its Unity Day celebration. Also responsible for murdering an F.B.I. mole who infiltrated his North Texas branch and a black judge back in Idaho for sentencing one of his group's members.; Hoagland (Mark Houghton) - Braxton's top lieutenant.; Note: This is Charles Homet's sixth and final appearance as Agent Troy Douglas "Doug" Foster...whose absence following this episode was never explained.
174	20	"The General's Return"	Christian I. Nyby II	Galen Tong	April 8, 2000	719	10.54
Dallas detective Steven Nimh (Phillip Moon)-- the son of General Nimh (Tzi Ma), who is Walker’s former martial arts instructor and superior officer during his time in the corps-- is killed by a Vietnamese gang led by Billy Lo (Bruce Locke) after having his cover blown while infiltrating his organization and assisting the Rangers in busting his illegal operations. In the aftermath of his death, the Rangers and Alex support Steven's grieving family-- his father, his widow, Michelle (Bokyun Chun), and his young son, Peter (Justin Mercado)-- while seeking to bring Lo and his gang to justice. Meanwhile, the Rangers, Alex, General Nimh and Michelle help Peter come to terms with his father's passing, as well as deal with a bully (Jesse Plemons) across the street. Antagonists: Billy Lo (Bruce Locke) - A Vietnamese gangster who is smuggling weapons in Dallas and ends up killing undercover cop Steven Nimh, who had been feeding information to Walker of his criminal activities.; Lee Chan (Reggie Lee) - A Vietnamese gangster who is Lo's second-in-command, and owns a car garage.; Russell Sr. (Charles Mooneyhan) and Russell Jr. (Jesse Plemons) - Father-and-son bullies living across the street from the Nimhs. Junior picks on Peter every day and his father approves of it. After learning a thing or two about self-defense from Walker and General Nimh, Peter was able to teach Junior a lesson, while the General did so with Senior.
175	21	"Showdown at Casa Diablo: Part 1"	Eric Norris	Bruce Cervi and John Lansing	April 29, 2000	720	10.83
To get their cannabis operations flowing, a pair of Mexican Cartel brothers seek to acquire a ranch near the border, especially after the owner was killed. The ranger pose as ranch hands in order to aid the widow while discovering her foreman's part in the killing. Antagonists: Cruz (Geoffrey Rivas) and Ramon Ortega (Carlos Sanz) - Mexican cannabis smuggling brothers determined to acquire Foley Ranch to expand their operations; Cruz later kidnaps Alex and Sydney in revenge for Ramon's arrest.; Travis (Gary Graham) - The foreman at Foley Ranch on the Ortega Brothers payroll who kills his employer after he subdued Ortega's smugglers.; Notes: John Beck, who portrays rancher Jake Foley, previously portrayed Sgt. Lou Ross in Season 5's "The Brotherhood" and Max Elson in Season 6's "Rainbow's End".
176	22	"Showdown at Casa Diablo: Part 2"	Jerry Jameson	Bruce Cervi and John Lansing	May 6, 2000	721	11.76
Walker, Trivette, and Gage go to Mexico to rescue Alex and Sydney. They work their way across the Mexican countryside to Casa Diablo. In the ensuing showdown, the drug lord and his brother are both killed. Antagonists: Cruz (Geoffrey Rivas) and Ramon Ortega (Carlos Sanz) - Mexican cannabis smuggling brothers determined to acquire Foley Ranch to expand their operations; Cruz later kidnaps Alex and Sydney in revenge for Ramon's arrest.
177	23	"The Bachelor Party"	Mike Norris	Rob Wright	May 13, 2000	722	12.52
On a wilderness trip for Walker's Bachelor Party, the men (Walker, Trivette, and Gage) have to contend with both a violent criminal out on bail and an equally violent grizzly bear which puts Gage in critical condition. Antagonists: Bart Slocum - A crime boss that Alex was prosecuting who makes bail by having his doctor fake his medical records that he was terminally ill and looks to track down the Rangers to eliminate them and prevent them from testifying against him before the bear interferes and kills everyone else in his group, leaving him the only survivor.; Craig (M.C. Gainey) and Amos - Two roughnecks residing in the area the Rangers were camping in. Later beaten by the Rangers when they attempted to shake up a bait store owner. Attempted to get revenge by joining Slocum's group after learning they were also after the Rangers by serving as their trackers, before they were also attacked by the bear.; A massive bear that attacks the bachelor trip, resulting in Gage's injuries. Ultimately after Walker retrieved a rifle brought by Slocum's group, he used it to kill the bear.
178	24	"Wedding Bells"	Christian I. Nyby II	Bob Gookin	May 20, 2000	723	13.16
179	25	"Wedding Bells"	Christian I. Nyby II	Bob Gookin	May 20, 2000	724	13.16
As Walker and Alex prepare to tie the knot, Walker finds out that they have both been targeted for death by an assassin. The wedding, which features a performance by country singer Tracy Lawrence, proceeds without incident. However, what happens en route to their honeymoon in Paris is a different story. (Joan Jett plays an ex-CIA Agent in this episode. In syndication, this is a two-part episode; however, it is one episode on the DVD release.) Antagonists: Johnson Carter (Charles Boswell) - A crime boss who wants Alex taken out in order to get off for his crimes by gaining influence over the jurors by having his trial delayed. His schemes fail, and he is prosecuted just before Alex and Walker officially wed.; Michael Westmoreland (Tony Denison) - An ex-CIA operative now an international assassin known to disguise his hits in the form of random serial killings and uses knives made from dry ice to kill Alex and Walker so that Johnson Carter's trial will be postponed. He never backs out of a contract but will agree to a bonus extension.; Dierdre Harris (Joan Jett) - Westmoreland's partner and lover, who is also a professional killer and former CIA. She is killed by Walker in Part 1.

=== Season 9 (2000–01) ===
No. overall	No. in season	Title	Directed by	Written by	Original release date	Prod. code	Viewers (millions)
180	1	"Home of the Brave"	Michael Preece	Rob Wright	October 7, 2000	801	11.57
To catch a group of kidnappers targeting newborns, Sydney and Gage play the role of foster parents in order to take down a baby-napping ring. Meanwhile, Alex encounters a corrupt building owner (Charles Lucia) trying to force tenants out of rent-controlled apartments and convinces a judge to enact a cease-and-desist order to halt the owner's attempt to have the place condemned so he can demolish it to make room for a strip mall. When young JJ Marshfield (Gavin Fink)-- whose parents (Amy Benedict and Gavin Glennon) made the complaints of the landlord's actions to the DA's office in the first place-- accidentally witnesses the owner's accomplice (Ian Paul Cassidy) sabotaging the building's boiler (so the owner could stage an accident to demolish the building without being held liable) and is trapped, Walker must rescue him before the building collapses. Antagonists: Gordon Fowler (Charles Lucia) - A corrupt landlord who tried to muscle tenants out of an apartment building for a strip mall project and aims to bypass a judge's cease-and-desist ruling that Alex demanded by destroying the building and trying to disguise it as an accident. Alex wanted to ensure the maximum penalty possible for him if he was caught violating his court order. It is unknown what happened to him after Gage and Sydney figured out his scheme and arrested him since JJ identified his accomplice, Holt, as the bomber. It's very likely that after Walker rescued JJ after he survived the explosion, he testified against him and Holt in court, earning them the death penalty or a life sentence due to the premeditated nature of the crime and the estimated deaths of four people in the bombing.; Holt (Ian Paul Cassidy) - Fowler's accomplice and top enforcer who beat up JJ's father and then planted the furnace bomb and trapped JJ in the basement for witnessing the crime. While JJ survived the explosion and was eventually rescued by Walker, four people were estimated to have been killed by the bomb. It is unknown what happened to him and Fowler after they were found out and arrested by Gage and Sydney due to Trivette positively identifying him as the bomber (since he and Walker were arriving at the apartment building when Holt was making his departure, along with the evidence they found when they located JJ). It's likely that JJ's testimony earned both men either a life sentence or the death penalty due to the premeditated nature of the crime.; A black market adoption organization who kidnaps and sells newborn babies.
181	2	"Deadly Situation"	Eric Norris	Gordon T. Dawson	October 14, 2000	803	10.05
When the Rangers are invited to Sage City to compete in a baseball game against the city's police department, Glenn Cooper (Michael Hagerty), a rookie officer and aspiring Ranger trying to expose corruption within his own department, is forced to take Alex hostage at the District Attorney's (Juli Donald) office after three corrupt detectives (Pat Skipper, Peter Crombie and Jay Huguley) that he busted for colluding with a drug dealer (Yasen Peyankov) framed him for stealing evidence from a recent drug bust and killed his partner (Patrick Amos). While working to protect Glenn (who happens to a descendant of legendary Texas Ranger, Hayes Cooper, and thus, a distant cousin of Walker) from both the corrupt officers and the rest of his own department who believe him to be dirty, the Rangers and Alex suspect that an outside source or a fourth party within the department involved in the drug dealer's operation tipped off the corrupt detectives to his investigation and framed him in an effort to silence him. In order to prove Glenn's innocence, the Rangers need to catch the informant behind the conspiracy. Antagonists: Chick Winslow (Yasen Peyankov) - The leader of the drug trafficking ring whom corrupt Sage City detectives Shell, Baker, Moody and Rogers had colluded with and had them frame Cooper for his crimes. He works with dirty cops to take out his competition and steal their drugs, at which point he sells the stolen drugs and splits them 50/50 with the dirty cops. As soon as he and Lt. Shell are found out after the arrest of Baker, Moody and Rogers by Gage and Sydney, Trivette and the former two Rangers lead the raid on his home while Walker and Captain Ryder (Bruce Weitz) deal with Shell. After the Rangers put his drug-trafficking operation out of business, Cooper is expected to earn a promotion for his role in the investigation.; Art Rudd (Stuart Greer) - Winslow's lieutenant.; Lt. Paul Shell (Wren T. Brown) - A corrupt detective lieutenant for the Sage City Police Department who, along with Baker, Moody and Rogers (a trio of dirty detectives), stole drugs taken during a massive drug bust and colluded with Chick Winslow's drug trafficking operation. After Cooper provided him with copies of the evidence regarding the trio's shady doings, instead of reporting it to internal affairs, he tipped off the trio, planted the stolen drugs in Cooper's locker, and then had Cooper's partner killed to frame him. When he is found out after the trio is arrested by Gage and Sydney, he commits suicide at his home before he could be arrested by Walker and Captain Ryder, while Trivette, Sydney and Gage deal with Chick Winslow. After the Rangers put Winslow's drug-trafficking operation out of business, Cooper is expected to earn a promotion for his role in the investigation.; Baker (Pat Skipper), Moody (Peter Crombie) and Rogers (Jay Huguley) - The corrupt detectives of Sage City working for Shell and Winslow. As soon as they were tipped off by Shell to Cooper busting them, Baker fired the shots that killed Cooper's partner and injured Sage County District Attorney Kristi Clark (Juli Donald). The trio attempted to destroy any and all evidence vindicating Cooper, especially copies that Glenn hid at a nearby library, but Gage and Sydney recovered the evidence first and arrested the trio. As soon as Chick Winslow is brought down and Lt. Shell committed suicide after his betrayal was revealed, Baker and Moody are said to be facing the death penalty for murdering Cooper's partner, and the attempted murder of Kristi Clark, while Rogers was spared and agreed to testify.; Smokey Cole (Matthew Posey) - A drug dealer whom Baker, Moody, Rogers and Lt. Shell stole drugs from after they arrested him. He is one of several drug dealers that serves as Chick Winslow's competition. It was his arrest by Baker, Moody, Rogers and Shell that triggered Cooper's investigation into the former three for corruption, right before Shell tipped off the trio to the bust, at which point the four corrupt officers planted the drugs in Cooper's locker to frame him. He cooperated with the Rangers in helping bust the dirty cops during the standoff at the D.A.'s office.
182	3	"White Buffalo"	Mike Norris	Janet A. Wilson and Michael L. Wilson	October 21, 2000	804	10.16
On the reservation, Walker investigates the mystery of a statue of a white buffalo (an animal sacred to the local native Americans) that appears to cry real tears. Gage goes undercover to bust the dealers of a designer drug called "white buffalo", while Sydney and Alex, who are on a hike in the mountains with a young Cherokee girl, Fawn (Charina Scott), to visit the site where the last white buffalo was killed, inadvertently stumble upon the headquarters of the drug distributors and Sydney is injured when she is shot in the arm forcing them to hide to escape their pursuers. Antagonists: Lance Corbin (Greg Travis) - A drug lord and creator of the drug called 'White Buffalo' and tries to kill Alex, Sydney and Fawn, who accidentally discovered their base in an abandoned shack.; Johnny Going-Snake (Fredrick Lopez) - Corbin's lieutenant who is a fervent tracker.
183	4	"The Avenging Angel"	Mike Norris	Shel Willens	October 28, 2000	802	9.36
Matt Escobar (Gary Kaspar), an old friend of Trivette's from their days on the Dallas Cowboys who is now a professional wrestler under the name "The Avenging Angel", dies in an act of sabotage during his trademark flying entrance into the ring, and when their search suggests that this was due to an extortion scheme against his manager by a local businessman (Richard Norton) to forcibly merge his company with their wrestling company, Sydney and Gage go undercover to gather evidence to prove it. At the end of this episode after the case has been solved, in an unrelated turn of events, Walker and the group receive devastating news: C.D. Parker has died. Guest starring Ernest Borgnine as Eddie Ryan. Antagonists: Frank Scanlon (Richard Norton) - A ruthless businessman who uses violence and threats to forcefully merge other companies with his, and will not hesitate to have someone murdered to make his targets fall in line.; Jerome Cutter (Wade Williams) - a former wrestler and Scanlon's top enforcer.; Harley Barnes (Jason Burkhart) - Cutter's accomplice who was hired by him to cut Matt's fly wire. Shortly after Matt's fall, Walker discovers samples of his blood on the catwalk (due to his hand having been cut by the wire) and sends it to the crime lab. He is arrested by Walker and Trivette after Sydney and Gage arrest the thugs he hired to kill one of Matt's fellow wrestlers. When Walker and Trivette discover his bandaged hand during the arrest, the blood from the catwalk comes back a match.
184	5	"The Winds of Change"	Eric Norris	Rob Wright	November 4, 2000	805	10.72
First episode of a four-part storyline, the longest in the series, which aired over four weeks during the November sweeps in 2000. At a senator's behest, Walker must stop a criminal genius who has infiltrated Federal law enforcement computer systems by leading a task force consisting of himself, Trivette, Gage, Sydney, a New York cop, and a computer hacker. Guest starring Paula Trickey (Pacific Blue). Antagonists: Nolan "The Chairman" Pierce (Michael Ironside) - A mysterious man based out of Chicago offering protection to other crime bosses in which he helps snuff out undercover agents.; Wallace "The Wizard" Slausen (TJ Thyne) - A highly-skilled computer hacker working personally for the Chairman.; Lazarus (Roger Yuan) - The Chairman's personal assassin who kills many undercover agents.; Alberto Cardoza (Andrew Divoff) - A South American Drug Lord residing in Dallas, who receives an offer of protection from the Chairman, who helps him discover that his lover is actually a DEA agent.; Note: Roger Yuan, who portrays Lazarus, had another villainous role on Walker as Chia Ko of the Golden Tong gang in Season 5's "Heart of the Dragon".
185	6	"Lazarus"	Michael Preece	Galen Tong	November 11, 2000	806	9.58
In the second episode of a four-part storyline, the Chairman (Michael Ironside) continues to use knowledge gained from his computer hacking to terrorize Federal agents, and manages to keep Walker at bay. However, Walker's hacker manages to discover a crucial detail in the Chairman's plan that could give them a breakthrough. Antagonists: Nolan "The Chairman" Pierce - A mysterious man based out of Chicago offering protection to other crime bosses in which he helps snuff out undercover agents.; Wallace "The Wizard" Slausen - A highly-skilled computer hacker working personally for the Chairman.; Lazarus - The Chairman's personal assassin. Killed a Chinese family in the Witness Protection Program at the request of Chen, one of the Chairman's clients. Later sent to Ft. Worth to kill the Goldbergs. Thanks to a sting operation Walker set up, he confronts and beats Lazarus. When Lazarus attempted to shoot Rosetti who came to back Walker up, Rosetti killed him in self-defense.; Clint Redman - A crime boss residing in Ft. Worth and client to the Chairman who runs a series of protection rackets. Later following Lonnie's arrest, he requested to the Chairman to help free Lonnie as he was his only son. After Lazarus was killed, he had chosen to have Lonnie murdered before Lonnie could expose him and was talking it over with the Chairman, only for the Task Force to arrive and arrest him once Lonnie confessed.; Lonnie Redman (Jeffrey Vincent Parise) - Clint Redman's son who secretly raised the protection money as a gift to his father, resulting in him killing a local man named Pete who could not pay, leaving a man named Ira Goldberg as a witness that forced him and his wife Ellen into hiding. Following Lazarus' death, he decided to confess everything so he would not go down alone, resulting in his father's arrest.
186	7	"Turning Point"	Eric Norris	Story by : Rob Wright; Teleplay by : Duke Sandefur	November 18, 2000	807	10.55
In the third episode of a four-part storyline, Walker begins making real progress in ending the Chairman's reign of terror. Hoping to gain an edge over Walker, the Chairman hijacks a plane carrying a key witness to protect one of his associates, and Gage and Sydney are their only hope of delivering it safely. Antagonists: Nolan "The Chairman" Pierce - A mysterious man based out of Chicago offering protection to other crime bosses in which he helps snuff out undercover agents.; Wallace "The Wizard" Slausen - A highly-skilled computer hacker working personally for the Chairman.; Kane - The Chairman's new assassin.; Billy Bob Jackson - A former mafia capo from New York as well as an old enemy of Rosetti now running his own organization in Miami, and is also a client to the Chairman.
187	8	"Retribution"	Michael Preece	Raymond C. Hartung	November 25, 2000	808	11.15
In a desperate bid to avoid capture as Walker closes in, the Chairman orders hits on the task force. But when that fails, he kidnaps Alex in the finale of a four-part storyline. Antagonists: Nolan "The Chairman" Pierce - A mysterious man based out of Chicago offering protection to other crime bosses in which he helps snuff out undercover agents.; Wallace "The Wizard" Slausen - A highly-skilled computer hacker working personally for the Chairman. Later betrayed and fatally wounded by his boss, but supplied the Task Force with the information on the crime families before he died.; Kane - The Chairman's new assassin.
188	9	"Child of Hope"	Mike Norris	Julie G. Beers	December 9, 2000	809	9.47
A young mother named Cara Parkins (Katie Wright) leaves her baby, Max (Max Carlos Norris), with Alex after her husband, Steve Parkins (Robert Floyd), who had previously served six months in prison for shoplifting, is killed by a gang of thieves whom he met in prison and assisted in a home invasion robbery gone wrong. Steve served as the lookout and getaway driver during the robbery and panicked when the homeowners, Mary and Oliver Winfield, returned home and were subsequently murdered by the gang. Alex decides to care for the baby, in spite of Walker's reluctance. As soon as the Rangers discover the link between the infant and his mother and the botched home invasion, attempts by the gang on the Cara's life are thwarted, with the final showdown being at the Walker ranch, where she is reunited with her parents. At the end of the episode, Alex finds out she is eight weeks pregnant. Antagonists: Jake Horbart (Jeffrey Dean Morgan) - Steve Parkins' former cellmate during his six-month stint for shoplifting and the violent leader of a gang of home invaders who kills Mary and Oliver Winfield when they surprise the gang by coming home early. After the gang steals the Winfields' Mercedes, tracks Steve to his home and kills him after he chickens out on them, they then try to hunt down and kill Cara since she witnessed Steve's murder and would tell the police everything. He is later killed by Walker along with one of his accomplices after they track Cara to his ranch.; Frank Jerrett (Clay Wilcox) - One of Horbart's accomplices and cellmates alongside Steve Parkins. He is killed by Walker while attempting to kill Cara at the H.O.P.E. Center.; Corky Randall (Brian Holechek) - One of Horbart's accomplices and cellmates alongside Steve Parkins. He is killed by being hit by a speeding semi while being pursued by Sydney and Gage when they stake him out at Zeke Zinzipper's shop; the semi never had the chance to slow down.; Zeke Zinzipper (Kyle Clementson) - The owner of a pawn shop whom Horbart and his accomplices regularly visit to pawn their stolen goods. When Gage and Sydney discover items belonging to the Winfields in his shop, he finds himself charged with accessory to murder.; Lopez (Mark Hanson) - One of Horbart's accomplices who joins him in hunting down and killing Cara after Randall and Jerrett are killed. He is later killed by Walker along with Horbart after they track Cara to his house.; Hoop - One of Hobart's accomplices. Arrested by the Rangers during a burglary while Horbart and Lopez are looking for Cara at Walker's house.; The Gorge Brothers - Two of Hobart's accomplices. Arrested by the Rangers during a burglary while Horbart and Lopez are looking for Cara at Walker's house.; Note: Jeffrey Dean Morgan, who plays the ringleader of the gang, Jake Horbart, would later go on to play John Winchester on the hit TV series Supernatural and he's one of the several actors on the show to appear on WTR. Jared Padalecki, who plays Sam Winchester, would appear on the reboot Walker as Cordell Walker.; Max Carlos Norris, who portrays Baby Max Parkins, is the son of Michael Norris, who directed the episode, and thus, he is the real-life grandson of Chuck Norris.
189	10	"Faith"	Michael Preece	Rob Wright	December 16, 2000	810	9.79
Faith Berry (Arreale Davis), the young granddaughter of Dionne Berry (special guest star Dionne Warwick), a close friend of Walker and Alex, who was diagnosed with a genetic liver disorder, is in need of a transplant when her current liver starts to fail and doctors diagnose that she may have a month or two to live. A donor, a young girl who was hit by a car, is found in Fort Worth two weeks later, but as the ambulance transporting the organ makes its way to the hospital, it crosses paths with a trio of bank robbers (Mark Kiely, Heath Lourwood, and Blake Adams) who did business with a ruthless loan shark (Lee Arenberg) whom Sydney had arrested three years prior. During their escape from law enforcement after committing a bank robbery, the getaway driver is injured, prompting the trio to hijack the ambulance, killing one paramedic and abducting the other. The robbers have no knowledge of or interest in the liver, needing their hostage solely to treat their injured comrade. Worse, Faith's current liver begins to fail rapidly than expected. As Dionne agonizes at the prospect of losing her granddaughter, having already lost her daughter (Faith's mother) to a drug overdose, the Rangers are left with very little time to track down the thieves, rescue the paramedic and recover the liver. Antagonists: Dwight & Toby Burner (Mark Kiely and Heath Lourwood, respectively) and Randy Delany (Blake Adams) - A trio of robbers, two of them brothers, who aim to pay off a ruthless loan shark following a bank robbery and hijack an ambulance carrying the organ intended for Faith during their escape. Toby, who served as the getaway driver while Randy and Dwight pulled the heist, sustained an injury during the chase (dropping his gun in the process, which Walker and Trivette eventually found in a storm drain, becoming a vital clue to finding their hideout), resulting in the three stealing the ambulance and needing the paramedic they kidnapped to treat Toby's injury, though not before they murdered another paramedic onboard. Toby was also once married to a woman named Rachel (Rebecca Stauber), who helped Walker and Trivette locate the barn the three used as their hideout. The three also wanted to kill their hostage after the job was done, but by then, Walker and Trivette finally found their hideout. After the two Rangers rescue the paramedic and recover the liver, the mission split: while Walker got the organ to the hospital in time for Faith's successful surgery, Trivette tried to arrest the three crooks while he and the kidnapped paramedic chased them in the ambulance, but the three wind up being killed in an explosive car accident.; Lester Squigman (Lee Arenberg) - A vile loan shark whom the Burner Brothers and Randy Delany are aiming to pay off before they flee to Mexico. Sydney busted him two years before she became a Texas Ranger. He was taken back to prison after being interrogated by Gage and Sydney as to the robbers' whereabouts.; Boyd (Greg Sandquist) - Squigman's enforcer. He is arrested by Sydney and Gage alongside Squigman when the two Rangers are looking for the Burner Boys at Toby's apartment.
190	11	"Golden Boy"	Eric Norris	Story by : Chuck Norris; Teleplay by : Raymond C. Hartung	January 6, 2001	811	9.79
Walker tries to keep promising young boxer Juan Guerrero (Nicholas Gonzalez) from throwing away his future after his caring mother (Marlene Forte) and abusive father (Patrick Montes) are killed in a traffic accident (due to the father's drunk driving). Meanwhile, the Rangers start an investigation to wipe out a counterfeit ecstasy ring which is selling Angel's Kiss (ecstasy laced with PCP), after three teens high on the drug and attending a rave party are hit and killed by a train. While surveying the drug dealers, they witness Juan at a meeting with the ring's leader (Íce Mrozek), whom Juan has been told by a classmate (Scott Caudill) involved in the drug ring is a big-time fight promoter. While the Rangers help him cope with his loss and get his future back on track, Juan soon becomes instrumental in helping them take down the drug ring. Antagonists: Nikolai "Nikki" Kosegin (Íce Mrozek) - A Russian drug lord who runs the ecstasy ring and has created a drug called "Angel's Kiss".; C.K. (Scott Caudill) - A classmate of Juan's involved in Kosegin's drug-trafficking operation.; Kirk (Jesse Head) - A teenage raver involved in Kosegin's drug-trafficking operation and also exposed Sydney and Gage when they attempted to infiltrate a rave party. When his father found out, he forced his son to cooperate with the Rangers.
191	12	"Desperate Measures"	Michael Preece	Duke Sandefur	January 20, 2001	812	10.83
After two bank robbers break their girlfriends out of a prison transport bus en route to the women's prison in Gatesville to continue their robbery spree, Walker and Trivette are in hot pursuit. Meanwhile, Gage, en route back to Dallas following a charity motorcycle ride, unknowingly hitches a ride with two other inmates from the same prison bus after the drive belt for his motorcycle is cut by two men whom he roughed up for harassing the women. One of them, Jane Harrelson (Helen Cates), is a thrill killer who killed three of her lovers, but the other, Lara Pope (Sarah Rafferty), is the victim of a setup by her entrepreneur ex-husband, Garrett (Terence Knox), who, upon hearing the news, sends his men out to kill her. While he and Trivette are in pursuit of the six fugitives, Walker suspects that Lara's case was mishandled and asks Alex to reexamine it. Antagonists-: Garrett Pope (Terence Knox) - An entrepreneur who killed his business partner and framed his ex-wife, Lara, for the crime. Lara's defense attorney, who was killed in a car accident long after the case, was complicit in the murder, testified against her and didn't file for an appeal as soon as it was over. He and his men also kill Lara's uncle Walt (Grant James) when he thinks she would be staying at his apartment after escaping.; Victor (John Fant) and Marcus (Norman Howell) - Pope's top enforcers.; Dag Tisker (Jack Watkins), Harley Birdwell (Eric Cadora), Randi Ruiz (Jameelah McMillan) and Aurora Slaughter (Jana Brockman) - A quartet of bank robbers and murderers; the women, who were sentenced to life for their crimes, were en route to prison along with Lara and Harrelson until their men broke them out to resume their crime spree. The men also have lengthy RAP sheets, as well. When Walker and Trivette stake out their next strike point, Birdwell, Slaughter and Ruiz were recaptured, while Tisker, who was fatally shot by Walker during the robbery, was taken to the morgue.; Jane "Hitch" Harrelson (Helen Cates) - A convicted serial killer who escapes with Lara after Birdwell and Tisker free Slaughter and Ruiz. However, unlike Lara, she is actually guilty, having a thing against men and having been sentenced to life without parole for killing three of her lovers. When she and Lara unwittingly give Gage a ride back to Dallas, she was considering killing a State Trooper who fails to identify the two convicts because of their dyed hair during a traffic stop, but she rethinks her decision and targets Gage instead after the women discover his identity when he presents his Ranger credentials to the Trooper during the stop, at which point he subsequently apprehends her afterwards, earning her new charges for attempted murder of a Texas Ranger.
192	13	"Division Street"	Mike Norris	Story by : Aaron Norris and Galen Tong; Teleplay by : Julie Beers	February 3, 2001	813	10.62
To help prevent gang-related activities, Walker and Boomer Knight (Hulk Hogan) organize basketball tournaments amongst a group of rival gang members. When Boomer convinces the kids not to work for a local drug dealer (Chaka Forman), the dealer takes his revenge by kidnapping Boomer. Now, Walker embarks on a manhunt to rescue Boomer and put an end to the drug dealer's reign. Antagonist: Carson (Chaka Forman) - A drug kingpin stirring up a gang war between the Blades and the Guardians, and intent on destroying Boomer's community center.
193	14	"Saturday Night"	Eric Norris	Rob Wright	February 10, 2001	814	9.40
Walker and Alex have dinner at a local nightclub with the wife (Denise Gentile) and daughter (Laura Bailey) of the owner, Frank Bishop (Frank Stallone). Meanwhile, Trivette goes undercover as a street hustler to investigate recent mob-related murders, which are also associated with the main plot. It is revealed that Bishop owes money to a loan shark (John Mariano) working for a notorious crime lord (Tony Lo Bianco) who wants him to repay the debt by signing over the club by Saturday night, even the threat of harming his family. Additionally, it's not only Frank's club that the loan shark is after; he and his associates aim to take control of every business in North Texas, whether legitimate or otherwise. Walker sets out to find a way to bring down the loan shark, and the murders may prove the smoking gun. Antagonists: Tony Ferrelli (Tony Lo Bianco) - A mafia boss looking to collect a debt by forcing Frank Bishop to sign over his business, and has people killed with acid baths if they rebel against his protection racket. He's even willing to target Frank's family. Frank was about to make his final payment until he decided that Sonny should have full ownership. His younger brother, Billy, is one of his three underbosses.; Sonny Martone (John Mariano) - Tony's top enforcer and a loan shark whom Frank did business with when he first opened his club.; Paul "Paulie" Bannon (Joe Sabatino), Carlos Gower (J.P. Romano), and Billy Ferrelli (Paul Dion Monte) - The underbosses of the Ferrelli Crime Family. Billy is Tony's younger brother.; Chachi (Rick Aiello) and Satch (John Gleeson Connolly) - Enforcers of Tony who run the prostitution game for the Ferrelli Crime Family, which is why Tony wants to claim ownership of Frank's club, since they need a cash-heavy business for their money laundering.; Eddie Coburn (Joseph Marino) - An enforcer of Tony Ferrelli responsible for giving the victims the acid baths.; Notes: Frank Stallone, who portrays Frank Bishop in this episode, previously portrayed BJ Ronson, the villain of Season 8's "Tall Cotton".; Billy "Sly" Williams, who plays a pimp named Luther in this episode, previously played Dread in Season 6's "Angel".
194	15	"Justice for All"	Christian I. Nyby II	Story by : Chuck Norris; Teleplay by : Gordon T. Dawson	February 17, 2001	815	11.05
Walker and his team are called in to investigate when Otis Gainer (C. Anthony Jackson), a lawyer preparing to file a scathing police brutality lawsuit against the city of Colby on behalf of serial rapist Slim Jackson (David Saunders), is found dead. Along with the lawsuit, Sergeant Thomas (Ajgie Kirkland), who arrested Jackson for raping a woman by the name of Cassie Jakes (Lori J. Jones) six months prior, is also accused of firing the shot that killed Gainer, and Walker is the only one who believes him, as does Pete Drayton (Brett Cullen), the attorney representing the Colby Police Department in the lawsuit. Meanwhile, Gainer's replacement, Lyle Nugent (Jonathan Adams) prepares to file lawsuits against Trivette, Sydney, and Gage on behalf of Jackson for a brawl he and his friends instigated against the Rangers after they attempted to question him earlier, to which Nugent plots to have Jackson and his friends falsely implicate the three Rangers' actions during the incident to receive a huge payoff from the civil suits, which also prompts an investigation by internal affairs. At the same time, Cassie's vengeful father, Tom Jakes (Beau Billingslea), furious with Jackson's case being dismissed due to a mistrial, the D.A. opting not to immediately re-file it, and Jackson now looking to get rich from the lawsuits, takes matters into his own hands and stalks Jackson relentlessly in order to try to catch him red-handed in raping another victim and get justice for his daughter, while Gainer's bodyguard, Moten (Lawrence LeJohn), seems more than eager to find out who killed his boss and will likely be helpful in vindicating Trivette, Sydney and Gage after he catches on to Nugent's scheme. Antagonists: Slim Jackson (David A. Saunders) - A serial rapist who is subjected to police brutality and is able to escape punishment (at least at first). Following the dismissal of Jackson's rape case involving Cassie Jakes due to a mistrial, Cassie's father, Tom ultimately exacts revenge by catching Jackson in the act of assaulting and attempting to rape another woman and makes a citizen's arrest that results in Jackson being imprisoned without bail, likely giving his victims the courage to come forward and testify. Moreover, as a result of Moten's testimony during the hearing for Gage, Sydney, and Trivette before internal affairs, his civil lawsuits against the Colby Police Department and the Rangers were swiftly dismissed after the judges became aware of the insider information exchanged between Drayton and Gainer after the former was exposed as the latter's and Sgt. Thomas's killer, and his new attorney, Lyle Nugent, is facing disbarment for perjury. Jackson's friends are also facing possible perjury charges due to Moten's testimony.; Lyle Nugent (Jonathan Adams) - Jackson's new lawyer after Gainer's assassination, who is willing to suborn perjury in court while slandering good cops in order to win civil suits, but the civil case filed against the Rangers soon falls apart when Moten catches on to his scheme. Because of Moten's testimony during Trivette, Gage and Sydney's hearing before internal affairs, both of Jackson's civil cases against the Rangers and the Colby Police Dept. were dismissed once judges became aware of the insider information exchanged between Gainer and Drayton after the latter was exposed as the killer, and internal affairs referred Nugent's actions to the state bar, resulting in his disbarment.; Otis Gainer (C. Anthony Jackson) - The hotshot amoral lawyer who once conspired with Pete Drayton to bilk the City of Colby out of millions of dollars in police brutality lawsuits in which Drayton lets him win each case, the city shells out the millions, and they split the profits. When he is hired by Slim Jackson to represent him in the police brutality suit against Sgt. Thomas and Patrolman Cross, who responded to the rape of Cassie Jakes six months prior, he is killed by Drayton for discarding their partnership in favor of a political career. Drayton framed Sgt. Thomas for the murder by planting two of his four used bullets from a case two years prior where Thomas shot two armed junkies-- one wielding a gun and another wielding a knife-- who attacked a nurse; two of Thomas's bullets killed the gunman, but the other two wounded the knife-wielder, and Gainer represented those junkies in a wrongful death suit. However, near the end of the episode, his bodyguard, Moten, after hearing about Nugent's scheme to slander Trivette, Gage and Sydney on Jackson's behalf, uncovered the truth. Also, after the judge overseeing Jackson's civil cases against the city and the Rangers had learned about the inside information he and Drayton shared, Jackson's cases were dismissed.; Pete Drayton (Brett Cullen) - The Colby PD defense attorney who had conspired with Otis Gainer in plot to bilk the City of Colby out of millions of dollars in millions of police brutality suits, wherein he intentionally loses each case, the city shells out the millions to Gainer and they split the profits. He kills Gainer for discarding their partnership after Gainer decided to go into politics, and frames Sgt. Thomas for the murder by planting two of his four used bullets from when Thomas shot two armed junkies (whom Gainer represented in a wrongful death suit) who attacked a nurse two years earlier. After which, he murders Thomas and makes it look like a suicide to close the case. Following Moten's cooperation with the Rangers in disclosing his actions, Drayton faces disbarment and a possible death sentence and will likely have to pay back the City of Colby millions in restitution. Also, due to the inside information he and Gainer shared had been revealed to the judge overseeing Slim Jackson's civil cases against the city and the Rangers, those cases were eventually thrown out.
195	16	"6 Hours"	Michael Preece	David T. Levinson	April 14, 2001	816	8.65
An awards banquet where Alex is being honored for her work at the H.O.P.E. Center quickly turns into a race against time when Heather Preston (Mercedes McNab), one of the center's best volunteers and the teenage daughter of Dallas billionaire businessman Tim Preston (Daniel Hugh Kelly) bound for Cornell University in the coming fall, is taken hostage by her traitorous bodyguard, McNeely (Nick Chinlund), during the ceremony. McNeely is demanding a $100 million ransom or else, within six hours, he will kill Heather. Walker, who has dealt with numerous ransom cases, warns Tim that McNeely won't free Heather even if the ransom is paid, because to complicate the situation further, McNeely brazenly plans to broadcast her murder on a live Internet feed, which quickly finds its way worldwide once the local news is alerted and offers live coverage of the crisis, after which he plans to escape the country. With Tim having already dealt with the pain of losing his wife and now agonizing at the thought of losing the only family he has left, the Rangers initiate a statewide manhunt to catch McNeely and rescue Heather before the deadline. Antagonists: Theodore McNeely (Nick Chinlund) - A Gulf War veteran who was a longtime bodyguard for Tim Preston's daughter, Heather, whom he kidnaps for a $100 million ransom due to refusing to accept a layoff by his employer once she relocates to Cornell University, and threatens to broadcast her murder over the internet should he not get the requested ransom, but during his fight with Walker, Walker restrains him in front of his own shotgun device at the very last second to save Heather, resulting in McNeely's death.; William Borla (Mark Stefanich) - McNeely's accomplice and disgraced pilot during the Gulf War, who led the attack on the awards banquet and aided McNeely in kidnapping Heather, then killed two of the banquet gunmen arrested by Gage and Trivette before they could be brought to HQ for interrogation by blowing up the cruiser transporting them (two other gunmen were killed by Walker and Sydney during the banquet attack), and then steals the Prestons' private jet after murdering their pilot so they can flee the country, but is captured and arrested by Gage when he, Trivette and Sydney search the Dallas area's airfields (which lack control towers so the fugitives could escape undetected) for the stolen jet. After seizing Borla's cellphone, Gage was able to relay McNeely's cellphone number to Walker, who, in turn, relayed it to the Prestons' communications guru, Seth, allowing the Rangers to pinpoint McNeely's location. It is unknown what happens to him after he and Gage watch Walker take out McNeely on live TV while waiting at the airfield for DPS officials to take him to jail. He also has a cousin named Tony, a pool hall owner who served four years in Huntsville for robbery.; Edmund (John Casino) - One of the five banquet gunmen who assisted McNeely and Borla in kidnapping Heather. He piloted the getaway van moments after McNeely and Heather made it out into the parking garage, where, before escaping, McNeely betrayed, shot and killed the limo driver, Dean. After bringing Heather to McNeely's hideout, he wanted his share of the ransom, but McNeely refused to pay him, shooting him in cold blood. Borla then disposed of his body before killing the two banquet gunmen who were arrested (the other two gunmen were killed by Walker and Sydney during the attack). Another banquet gunman was portrayed by Ken Greaves.; Tony Borla (Gary Ragland) - The cousin of William Borla and the owner of the Conflict of Interest Pool Hall. He spent a four-year stint in Huntsville for robbery. When Gage and Sydney question him about Borla's whereabouts, he recalls how he had reconnected with him after several years, and Borla told him how he was coming into some money and looking forward to flying again. He didn't really know much, but the Rangers quickly deduced that along with the ransom money McNeely demanded, Borla would also steal the Prestons' private jet.; Note: Mercedes McNab, who plays Heather, would share the screen with Jared Padalecki several years later in the Supernatural episode "Fresh Blood" as a vampire named Lucy, having played Harmony Kendall in Buffy the Vampire Slayer over the years. Daniel Hugh Kelly, who plays Heather's father Tim, also makes a guest appearance in Supernatural as Sheriff Jake Devins in the first season episode "Dead in the Water". Jared Padalecki, who plays Sam Winchester, would later portray the titular ranger, Cordell Walker, on the reboot Walker.
196	17	"Medieval Crimes"	Eric Norris	Story by : Raymond C. Hartung and Chuck Norris; Teleplay by : Raymond C. Hartung	April 21, 2001	817	8.36
Workers at a Medieval-themed restaurant moonlight as fine art and jewelry thieves. But after one of them is killed during a robbery, Sydney and Gage go undercover at the restaurant to find the rest of the gang. Trivette goes to a prison farther away from Dallas to pick up a prisoner (Ernie Grunwald) that says that he is a jinx to have him testify in a murder trial, at which point they encounter many hijinks en route back, from Trivette's car breaking down to getting sick from eating bad swordfish and the like. Antagonists: Hawkins (Jeff Yagher), Ben Wiley (Josh Holloway) & Curtis Pollard (Ralph Prodoti)- A trio of Medieval restaurant performers who are known to stage a series of heists involving the theft of jewels and art. The latter of whom was killed during one of the robberies. Wiley also has a girlfriend named Lisa (Stacy Hogue).
197	18	"Legends"	Mike Norris	Rob Wright	April 21, 2001	818	10.95
An infamous mob boss named Sammy Viscardi is convicted and facing life in federal prison for a quantity of crimes ranging from homicide to racketeering, and following his trial, the head juror, Connie Gibson (Lyn Montgomery), is killed the very next morning. The Rangers determine that Viscardi's son and successor in his organization, Michael Viscardi (Jay Bontatibus), is seeking revenge against everyone who incarcerated his father, targeting them for assassination. The list includes not only Gibson and the other jurors, but the presiding federal judge, Abe Stiegler (Jerry Haynes), and Alex, who served on the prosecution team. He carries out the hits by having his middle man (John Thaddeus) hire people unconnected to his organization, and then kills them after the hits to cover his tracks. With Gibson and Stiegler killed, the Rangers seek to connect Michael to the killings and catch him before Alex becomes his next victim. Meanwhile, Walker's kickboxing friends (Joe Lewis, Howard Jackson, Bill Wallace and Don Wilson, all playing as themselves) are in town for the World Kickboxing Championships set to take place in Dallas that weekend. Antagonists: Michael Viscardi (Jay Bontatibus) - The son of convicted crime boss Sammy Viscardi, who seeks to kill those that convicted his father, a list that includes Connie Gibson (the head juror), Abe Stiegler (the federal judge overseeing the case), Alex (serving on the prosecution team and sitting at the end of his hit list) and Walker (who may or may not have been involved in Sammy's arrest), and then have the hitmen killed once the job is done. Later arrested at the Walker Ranch alongside two of his goons after the Rangers learned of his attempt to murder Alex, to which Sydney impersonated Alex so she and Walker could stage a sting operation to catch them.; Samuel "Sammy" E. Viscardi (Robert Sign) - Father of Michael Viscardi, a crime boss convicted and sentenced to life in federal prison for seven counts of kidnapping, five counts of murder, and 23 counts of extortion and racketeering. His incarceration kicked off a new case for the Rangers, and it was stopping his son's rampage of revenge against everyone responsible for his prosecution, especially Alex.; Dean Scaggs (John Thaddeus) - Michael Viscardi's middle man and a hired enforcer connected to organized crime rings across the state of Texas. He was responsible for employing the blind hires to carry out the hits against Sammy's jailers on Michael's behalf, and then killing the hires after the job was done. When a warrant is issued for his arrest after he is ID'd by Floyd (one of Judge Stiegler's killers whom Trivette arrested after saving him from being killed after the hit was committed), he meets a gruesome end at Michael's hands while being pursued by Gage and Sydney. When Gage and Sydney follow him to Michael's office and find his lifeless body on the desk, a foreboding clue ("D.A. Walk..." written in blood) signifies that Alex is next on Michael's hit list, at which point Walker and Sydney set a trap to catch him.; Floyd (Scott Latham) - One of the two blind hires whom Scaggs hired to perpetrate the hit on Judge Stiegler during Michael's revenge campaign against his father's jailers. Paid $50,000 to perpetrate the hit (though they only got half of it before the hit), he and his partner spread Stiegler's office with unodorized propane, and the moment Stiegler entered the office, he was blown to smithereens. While the Rangers search the oil refineries and gas plants for Stiegler's killers following the arson investigation, Michael had already ordered Scaggs to kill him and his partner. Scaggs killed his partner when Trivette caught them, but he survived the attack, thanks to him crouching down in their truck and Trivette firing at Scragg's helicopter to drive it off; after which, Trivette arrested him. He then ID'd Scaggs as the middle man, prompting the Rangers to have an arrest warrant issued for him.; Johnny Zubliski (Max Hartman) - Nicknamed "Johnny Zoom", a car thief who got off on a technicality for vehicular homicide a few years prior to the Viscardi case. The next day after Sammy Viscardi's conviction, he was hired to perpetrate the hit on the head juror, Connie Gibson, in which he rammed into her with a stolen brand-new Buick LeSabre, pushing her off the roof of a parking garage, and then hid the grille of the stolen vehicle in a junkyard to try to cover his tracks. When Gage and Sydney try to arrest him, he is killed by Dean Scaggs in order to keep him from talking.; Hugo Bianco (Peter Siragusa) - A junkyard owner who tried to help Zubliski cover up the murder of Connie Gibson when he hides the grille of the stolen Buick LeSabre used in the murder at his place of business, only for him and his employees to be arrested by Gage and Sydney for accessory to murder. While he did tell Gage and Sydney who brought the grille in, it is unknown what happens to him after that bust.
198	19	"Unsafe Speed"	Garry A. Brown	Duke Sandefur	April 28, 2001	819	8.49
After a truck driver who was using meth kills a family of three by colliding with their minivan, he tells the Rangers who his supplier was before he dies and the supplier in turn tells them that a biker gang gave him the meth. Meanwhile, Alex discovers that with the driver's record of traffic violations and drug convictions, he would not have been qualified and given a trucker's license in Texas, let alone any state in the union, and there have also been similar recent incidents of unqualified drivers. The recent fatal accident triggers a two-pronged investigation for the Rangers: while Sydney and Gage go undercover as bikers to infiltrate the gang and shut down their meth lab, Trivette goes undercover as a new trucker applicant at a licensing firm in Colby to find the person who is illegally issuing trucker's licenses. Antagonists: The Raptors Motorcycle Club - One of the toughest biker gangs in the southwest distributing crystal meth-- 99.44% pure-- to big rig truckers nationwide, licensed or otherwise. The deadly crash caused by Boyd Scranton, an improperly licensed trucker, while he was transporting theirs and Darby's merchandise to Cincinnati was what alerted the Rangers to their criminal activities. Gage and Sydney went undercover in their group and had to make them think they killed a State Trooper (Adam Vernier) in order pass their initiation and gain access to their meth lab, only for one trucker who witnessed the arrest of a fellow mule by the Rangers to eventually recognize Gage through his disguise and blow his and Sydney's cover. Its members include: Grangus (Steve "Sting" Borden) - The club's President who is distributing the meth to truckers while eliminating the competition on their turf. He tried to kill Sydney at their meth lab after the gang caught on to hers and Gage's cover, but Walker and Gage saved her in time before it exploded while Trivette, Trooper Freels (Vernier) and other DPS officials apprehended Bolger, Darby and the other bikers and dealers.; Bolger (Todd Tesen) - The club's Sergeant-at-Arms and Grangus's top enforcer in charge of distribution and sales alongside Tramp. He tried to kill Gage upon realizing who he was, until Walker, Trivette, Trooper Freels and other DPS officials showed up to arrest the bikers and Darby. Trivette then arrests him while Walker and Gage race to the meth lab to stop Grangus from killing Sydney.; Doc (Larry Hankin) - The club's cook in charge of the meth lab.; Tramp (Hank Stone) - In charge of distribution and sales alongside Bolger; he drives the supply van. Trooper Freels arrests him when he, Walker, Trivette and other DPS officials show up to save Gage from being killed after having his cover blown.; Mona (Scarlett McAlister) - Grangus's girlfriend.; Boyd Scranton (Andrew Rothenberg) - An improperly-licensed trucker due to his long record of minor drug convictions and traffic violations. While under the influence of the Raptors' meth, he killed a couple and their young daughter (the father was outside changing the minivan's tire) by colliding his big rig into their minivan, which alerted the Rangers to the Raptors' meth-making operation and the corrupt DMV employee in Colby. Following the accident, it took DPS officials about two hours to free him from the wreckage, at which point troopers found the meth in his rig. Genuinely remorseful for the accident while being interrogated by Walker and Trivette, he dies in his hospital bed, though not before he tells the two Rangers where he got his meth from.; Deke Trumbull (Tom Schuster) - A trucker who served as a mule for the Raptors. Boyd Scranton got his meth from him before he died in his hospital bed following the recent fatal crash. It is unknown what happens to him after he is arrested by the Rangers, but another mule who witnessed the arrest later recognized Gage through his disguise, blowing his and Sydney's cover.; Vander (Tommy G. Kendrick) - A trucker who served as a mule for the Raptors. He witnessed Deke Trumbull's arrest by the Rangers at the truck stop Scranton visited before he died, and was quick to recognize Gage through his disguise at the truck stop on Bluelake Highway, where the Raptors were busy distributing their handiwork for Darby. He tips off Bolger to who Gage and Sydney really are, putting their lives at risk, but as soon as DPS officials stop him at the inspection checkpoint nearby the distribution site and find meth in his rig, Walker and Trivette quickly realize Gage and Sydney are in trouble upon recognizing him from the truck stop where Trumbull was arrested and quickly take down the bikers and rescue their fellow Rangers.; Darby (Patrick St. Esprit) - A drug dealer who plots to distribute the Raptors' meth nationwide. When Boyd Scranton killed the couple and their daughter while transporting his and the Raptors' merchandise, that crash alerted the Rangers to their criminal activities. He is eventually arrested by Walker, Trivette, Freels and other DPS officials when they find out Sydney and Gage's cover was blown.; Earl (Lynn Mathis) and the DMV Insider - Earl is a corrupt DPS Driver License Division official at the Colby DMV who, along with an insider, was illegally issuing trucker licenses like they were candy. He basically turned his workplace into a CDL mill, compromising public safety for profit. Alex had been investigating Earl for quite some time, and when Boyd Scranton became his most recent customer, Trivette decided to help Alex bust him following that fatal crash. Trivette, going undercover as a trucker applicant with a poor driving record and lengthy RAP sheet, was able to trick the insider into leading him to Earl by staging bribes on honest DMV clerks, allowing him to bust both of them.; Notes: Hank Stone (who portrayed Tramp) and Patrick St. Esprit (who portrayed Darby) previously worked together in Season 6's "The Fighting McClains", where the latter played drug kingpin Jack Garrett and the former played Garrett's lieutenant, Jake Reed. Stone also had another villainous role as bank robber Frank Hillman in Season 7's "Mind Games".
199	20	"Without a Sound"	Mike Norris	Aurorae Khoo	April 28, 2001	820	10.76
During his high school reunion, Gage is forced into a leave of absence after an explosion caused by a gang of high-tech carjackers badly ruptures his eardrums after the leader of the gang, who goes by the name of Skull (Carlos Bernard), brutally murders his former girlfriend, Marilyn Elkins (Holly Hickman), and her fiancé, Ted Moran (Brent Anderson). While Gage contemplates surgery to fully restore his hearing and Sydney is tasked with protecting him from assassination attempts by Skull and his gang to prevent him from testifying after he had provided a composite sketch following the aftermath of the thefts, she, Walker and Trivette work shut down the carjacking ring and apprehend the gang, eventually learning that their criminal enterprise extends to smuggling stolen vehicles across the border into Mexico in exchange for cocaine. All the while, Sydney and the ENT doctor (Lloyd Battista) performing the surgery reach out to the director of a school for deaf individuals (Beverly Nero) to help Gage come to terms with his new disability and rely on his other senses that ultimately prove useful in protecting himself. Antagonists: Raoul "Skull" Hidalgo (Carlos Bernard) - The violent leader of a carjacking ring who kills Marilyn Elkins and Ted Moran to steal their car, and then tries to assassinate Gage as a witness after finding out he survived the explosion and provided a sketch that could help citizens identify him (and help Gage identify him once the Rangers manage to get his name), earning him and his gang charges for capital murder and attempted murder of a Texas Ranger, as well as a trip to the Huntsville death house. Even as a teenager (as revealed when Gage positively identified him as the killer in a past mugshot Sydney looked up), Skull had accumulated a criminal record ranging from armed robbery to possession. When he tried to assassinate Gage at the Ranger office while Walker, Trivette and Sydney apprehended his second-in-command and the rest of the thieves, Gage was considering killing him for the murders following the office brawl, but decided to let a court handle it, testimony and all.; Rio (Carlos Alvarado) - Skull's second-in-command.; Flicks (Joe Costanza) - A chop shop owner who had done business with Skull's gang when the stolen cars were brought to his shop. He didn't really know anything else about Skull's operations extending across the border. It's also likely he'd never seen Skull's face before, saying that he bears a resemblance to his cardiologist.
200	21	"Blood Diamonds"	Eric Norris	Raymond C. Hartung	May 5, 2001	821	8.28
In an episode told in flashbacks, the Rangers try to bring a halt to the black market trade of African conflict diamonds for illegal weaponry. The case kicks off when a Ugandan diamond smuggler (Greg Wayne Elam) working for a rebel group in Sierra Leone turns up dead in his hotel room, having been killed by a pimp (Larry Johnson) during a one-night stand with a hooker (Amy Collett), and when Trivette and Walker find his smuggled goods, the two go undercover, respectively, as the deceased smuggler and a weapons expert, while Gage and Sydney try to track down the pimp. Meanwhile, when the Rangers learn from the medical examiner's office that the smuggler was a carrier of Ebola virus, Alex finds herself in danger of exposure to the disease after she, Gage and Sydney questioned the hooker (whom the smuggler transferred the virus to along with the pimp moments before his murder), and matters go worse when Walker and Trivette are being tracked down by the men responsible for the illegal trade after they discover their true identities. The episode would not only turn out to be a vivid nightmare by Alex, but also a premonition, which might result in the deaths of Walker and Trivette. Antagonists: Victor Drake (Peter Woodward) - An international arms dealer born in Britain who specializes in illegal weapons and smuggling chemicals to Iraq to make nerve gas and sitting at the FBI's Top 10 most wanted list.; Hendrick Rolfe (Ray Proscia) - Drake's top enforcer and a Danish mercenary who fought in Africa.; Joseph Ileka (Greg Wayne Elam) - A South African rebel and diamond smuggler from Uganda and black market trader posing as a telecommunications consultant, who deals in weapons, drugs, and conflict diamonds. He was also diagnosed with Ebola and transfers it to a prostitute and her pimp moments before he is killed.; Flint (Larry Johnson) - The pimp for a prostitute named Sparkle, whom Ileka had a one-night stand with. Moments before he killed Ileka, he and Sparkle both contracted his Ebola virus, and was tested positive when he was shot dead by Sydney when she and Gage tried to arrest him in order for the Rangers to contain the virus, only for his bartender best friend to spark a bar fight and everyone else in the bar to get quarantined.; General Nelson Abu (Lanier Edwards) - The leader of the rebel group in Sierra Leone whom Ileka worked for. He is arrested by the Rangers after Flint is killed.; Notes: Greg Wayne Elam, who portrays Joseph Ileka, is the father of actor and stuntman Ousaun Elam, who had several roles on "WTR", such as escaped convict Fred Corley in Season 6's "Saving Grace".
201	22	"The Reel Rangers"	Christian I. Nyby II	Julie Beers	May 5, 2001	822	10.26
Walker and Alex make preparations for the impending arrival of their baby. Meanwhile, the Rangers end up on a movie set and become stars in the process. A charity motorcycle ride features Walker and Trivette. Antagonists: Sam Cardinal (Jed Allan) - A filmmaker and drug trafficker who is filming a B movie as a cover to run a drug smuggling operation across the Mexico–United States border.; Swails (Ingo Neuhaus) - Cardinal's lieutenant.
202	23	"The Final Showdown"	Aaron Norris	Gordon T. Dawson	May 19, 2001	823	10.82
203	24	"The Final Showdown"	Aaron Norris	Gordon T. Dawson	May 19, 2001	824	10.82
In the series finale, a gang of Walker's former enemies break out of the Texas State Penitentiary in Huntsville. They proceed to exact revenge on Walker and his fellow Rangers by exterminating Ranger Company B in its entirety... including Wade Harper (along with his wife Betsy indirectly which both of them were last seen in Season 8's "A Matter of Principle") and Cliff Jensen (Michael Costello), who were among the attendees in the pre-birth barbecue Walker and Alex were hosting. The leader of this group, Emile Lavocat (Marshall R. Teague), also reveals that he murdered C.D. Parker via ricin poisoning before he shot Jensen. Meanwhile, Alex goes into labor and makes clear her concern for Walker's well-being, as she does not want to raise this baby alone; elsewhere, Trivette asks an old girlfriend Erika to marry him (she was last seen in Season 8's "Justice Delayed", recruiting Trivette to help clear the name of her jailed father). One last Hayes Cooper story also concurs: Cooper retires from the Texas Rangers to raise a family, but a group of outlaws – led by an old enemy (who is Lavocat's ancestor) – plot to kill him, which could force him out of retirement. At the episode's end, the Rangers take down the gang (with Walker blowing up Lavocat with a grenade), and Alex and Walker introduce their daughter Angela (a reference to Chuck Norris's 1988 movie Hero and the Terror) to their friends. (Note: In syndication, this is a two-part episode.) Antagonists: Emile Lavocat (Marshall R. Teague) - A vicious bank robber, murderer, and gang leader who led a series of bank robberies years before being taken down by the Company B Texas Rangers. He escapes prison and stages a violent prison break at Huntsville to spring out and his old crew, resulting in the deaths of several guards and inmates, with revenge against the Company B Rangers in mind, including Walker, Trivette, C.D., Jensen and Harper (which Harper's wife Betsy ended up becoming an unintended victim as well). He comes from a long lineage of criminals and is revealed to have killed C.D. via ricin poisoning as the first Ranger to die in his revenge campaign.; Milos "Moon" Lavocat (also portrayed by Teague) - A 19th Century French/Seminole outlaw and Emile Lavocat's great-great grandfather who runs a gang called the "Desperados" in taking over a town, and is known to scalp his victims.; Robert Chastain (Leon Rippy), Ross Dollarhide (Randall "Tex" Cobb), Jonas Graves (Richard Norton) and Mike Shilts (John Dennis Johnston) - Lavocat's top lieutenants. However, due to Dollarhide's obsession with having sex with prostitutes, it would be the key factor for the Rangers in tracking Lavocat's gang.; Creede (also portrayed by Rippy) - Moon's lieutenant.; Desperados (including two portrayed by Cobb and Norton) - Moon's gang of outlaws.

=== Television film (2005) ===
Title	Directed by	Written by	Original release date	Viewers (millions)
Walker, Texas Ranger: Trial by Fire	Aaron Norris	John Lansing & Bruce Cervi	October 16, 2005	10.20
