= Peter Haskell filmography =

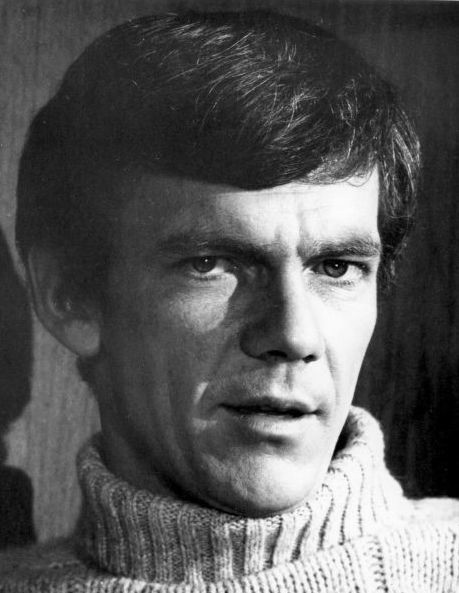
Haskell in 1969

This is the complete filmography of actor Peter Haskell (October 15, 1934 – April 12, 2010).

== Film ==
Year	Title	Role	Notes
2008	Sex and Lies in Sin City	Ian Miller	TV movie
1996	Once You Meet a Stranger		TV movie
1993	Robot Wars	Rooney	
1992	A Murderous Affair: The Carolyn Warmus Story	Tom Warmus	TV movie
1992	Maid for Each Other	Don Stone	TV movie
1991	Child's Play 3	Sullivan	
1990	Child's Play 2	Sullivan	
1989	Riding the Edge	Dean Stradling	
1982	The Forty Days of Musa Dagh	Maris Durand	
1979	The Fantastic Seven	Phil Samson	TV movie
1979	The Cracker Factory	Charlie Barrett	TV movie
1979	Mandrake	William Romero	TV movie
1978	The Jordan Chance	Lee Southerland	TV movie
1978	Superdome	Doug Collins	TV movie
1977	The Night They Took Miss Beautiful	Damon Faulkner	TV movie
1974	The Legend of Earl Durand	Earl Durand	
1976	Risko	Lewis Pollock	TV movie
1974	Christina	Simon Bruce	TV movie
1974	The Phantom of Hollywood	Ray Burns	TV movie
1972	The Man Who Came to Dinner	Bert Jefferson	TV movie
1969	The Ballad of Andy Crocker	Nelson	ABC Movie of the Week
1972	The Eyes of Charles Sand	Charles Sand	ABC Movie of the Week
1971	Love Hate Love	Leo Price	ABC Movie of the Week
1966	Passages from James Joyce's Finnegans Wake	Shem	

== Television ==
Year	Title	Role	Notes
2009	ER	Fred Thunhurst	Episode: "And in the End..."
2007	Cold Case	Will Paige	Episode: "World's End"
2005	The Closer	Judge	Episode: "The Big Picture"
2002	Philly	Robert Chasen	Episode: "Thanks for the Mammaries"
2000-03	JAG	Ellis Burke; Older Ron Graham	Episode: "A Separate Peace: Part 1"; Episode: "Each of Us Angels"
2000	Frasier	Bob Vernon	Episode: "Mary Christmas"
1997	Diagnosis: Murder	Judge M. Phillip Shepherd	Episode: "In Defense of Murder"
1993	Dark Justice		Episode: Pygmalion
1993	Danger Theatre	Senator Talbot	Episode: "Lethal Luau"
1992	Room for Two	Peter Nolan	Episode: "A Night with the Jetsons"
1991	Babes	Fred	Episode: "Mom"
1991	Columbo	Budd Clarke	Episode: "Caution: Murder Can Be Hazardous to Your Health"
1990-91	Matlock	Emcee Dennis Blake; Sen. Peter Dolan	Episode: "The Game Show"; Episode: "The Blackmailer"
1990	Booker	Peter Larkin	Episode: "Black Diamond Run"
1989	Christine Cromwell	Hayes Thorogood	Episode: "Easy Come, Easy Go"
1989	Jake and the Fatman	Benjamin Thorne	Episode: "Sweet Leilani"
1987-88	The Law & Harry McGraw	Tyler Chase	16 episodes
1987	The Colbys	Dr. Bill Banks	3 episodes
1986-89	Murder, She Wrote	Leland Biddle; Terence Locke	Episode: "Truck Stop"; Episode: "Corned Beef and Carnage"
1986	Hunter	Roger Hennessy	Episode: "The Contract"
1986	MacGyver	Colonel Woodward	Episode: "The Human Factor"
1986	Too Close for Comfort	Chandler Stark	Episode: "Henry's Novel Solution"
1986	Alfred Hitchcock Presents	Paul Foley	Episode: "The Canary Sedan"
1986	Blacke's Magic	Granville Stuart	Episode: "Prisoner of Paradise"
1983-1985	Search for Tomorrow	Lloyd Kendall #1	104 episodes
1985	The A-Team	Warden Crichton	Episode: "The Heart of Rock N' Roll"
1985	Rituals	C.J. Field	3 episodes
1982-83	Ryan's Hope	Hollis Kirkland III	4 episodes
1982	Father Murphy	Alex Clark	Episode: "Outrageous Fortune"
1981	Code Red		Episode: "All That Glitters"
1981	The Fall Guy	E. Charles Neiman	Episode: "The Rich Get Richer"
1981	Hart to Hart	The Doctor	Episode: "Getting Aweigh with Murder"
1981	The Love Boat	Wendell Carson	3 episodes
1979-1981	Vega$	various	4 episodes
1979	Shirley	Jake Miller	Episode: "Visions of Christmas Past"
1979	B. J. and the Bear	Jay Michael Lawrence	Episode: "The Eyes of Texas"
1979	The Duke	Hugh Vannerson	Episode: "The Pilot: Duke"
1979	The Magical World of Disney	Dave Bryant	Episode: "Shadow of Fear: Part 1" and "Shadow of Fear: Part 2"
1978	This Is the Life		Episode dated 2 July 1978
1978	Fantasy Island	James Defoe	Episode: "Treasure Hunt/Beauty Contest"
1977	I Am the Greatest: The Adventures of Muhammad Ali	Additional voices	Episode: "Oasis of the Moon"
1977	Charlie's Angels	Doug O'Neal	Episode: "Angel in Love"
1977	The Bionic Woman	Payton Jones	Episode: "Biofeedback"
1976-1977	Rich Man, Poor Man Book II	Charles Estep	17 episodes
1975	Medical Center	various	4 episodes
1975	Caribe	Ellis Grune	Episode: "Murder in Paradise"
1975	Khan!		Episode: Mask of Deceit
1975	The Streets of San Francisco	Dr. William Fitzpatrick 'Bill' Dunson / James Cooper	Episode: "River of Fear"
1974	Firehouse	Gurney	Episode: "False Alarm"
1974	Cannon	Mark Ballard	Episode: "The Prisoner"; Episode: "Blood Money"
1974	Amy Prentiss	Ross Whitman	Episode: "Baptism of Fire"
1974	The Manhunter	James Wyland	Episode: "The Deadly Brothers"
1974	Police Surgeon	Rick	Episode: "Man in the Middle"
1973-76, 1980	Barnaby Jones	various	3 episodes
1973-74	The Wide World of Mystery	Tommy Kennicott; Clifford Swimmer	Episode: "Suicide Club"; Episode: "The Cloning of Clifford Swimmer"
1973	Hawaii Five-O	Art Walker	Episode: "The Flip Side Is Death"
1973	Assignment Vienna		Episode: "A Deadly Shade of Green"
1972	Mission: Impossible	Gordon Holt	Episode: "TOD-5"
1972	The Mary Tyler Moore Show	Mark Williams	Episode: "What Is Mary Richards Really Like?"
1972	Longstreet	Roy Landers	Episode: "The Sound of Money Talking"
1971	McCloud	Richard Stevens	Episode: "Encounter with Aries"
1971	The Interns	Ben Bohannan	Episode: "Heart Trouble"
1971-74	The F.B.I.	Selkirk; Eliot Fielding	Episode: "Selkirk's War"; Episode: "Three-Way Split"
1970	Julia	Kevin Grant	Episode: "Sara's Second Part"
1969-1970	Bracken's World	Kevin Grant	41 episodes
1969, 1980	Insight	Donald Quinlan; Kelly	Episode: "God in the Dock"; Episode: "The Poker Game"
1969	Land of the Giants	Enog	Episode: "Return of Inidu"
1968-1973	Mannix	various	3 episodes
1968	Judd for the Defense	Adam McKee	Episode: "The Sound of the Plastic Axe"
1968	Garrison's Gorillas	Dieter; Erik	Episode: "Time Bomb"; Episode: "War and Crime"
1968	Lassie	Chuck Conroy	3 episodes
1967	The Medicine Men		
1967	Iron Horse	Joel Banner	Episode: "The Silver Bullet"
1966-1968	The Big Valley	various	3 episodes
1966	The Green Hornet	Abel Marcus	Episode: "Crime Wave"
1965-66	Ben Casey	Dr. Anson Brooks/James Tevlin	3 episodes
1965-67	Combat!	various	3 episodes
1965	Rawhide	Jethroe Kane	Episode: "Encounter at Boot Hill"
1965	12 O'Clock High	Doc	Episodes "P.O.W.: Part One" and "P.O.W.: Part Two"
1965	The Fugitive	Bob Sterne	Episode: "Runner in the Dark"
1965	The Man from U.N.C.L.E.	Riley	Episode: "The Mad, Mad Tea Party Affair"
1965	Dr. Kildare	Paul Williams	Episode: "Please Let My Baby Live"
1964	The Outer Limits	Peter Jellicoe	Episode: "Wolf 359"
1964	Death Valley Days	Slim Kennedy	Episode: "The Left Hand Is Damned"
