= Born to Ride =

Born to Ride may refer to:

- Born to Ride (1991 film), a film directed by Graham Baker
- Born to Ride (2011 film), a film directed by James Fargo
- Born to Ride (Super Mario World), an episode of the television series Super Mario World
