= James Fargo =

American film director

- Born: August 14, 1938 (age 87); Republic, Washington, U.S.
- Occupation(s): Film director, television director
- Years active: 1969–present

James Fargo (born August 14, 1938) is an American film director. He directed numerous films from 1976 to 1998. After serving as assistant director to Steven Spielberg on Duel and on many films starring Clint Eastwood, he was then given the chance to direct the third Dirty Harry film, The Enforcer, in 1976.

Later, he also directed Eastwood in 1978's Every Which Way but Loose, his final film working with Eastwood. Fargo has also directed other films such as Caravans, A Game for Vultures, Voyage of the Rock Aliens, and Forced Vengeance with Chuck Norris.

Fargo has also directed television shows, such as The A-Team, Hunter, Scarecrow and Mrs. King, and Beverly Hills, 90210.

Fargo's last film was 2011's Born to Ride.

== Filmography ==
- The Enforcer (1976)
- Caravans (1978)
- Every Which Way but Loose (1978)
- Game for Vultures (1979)
- Forced Vengeance (1982)
- Tales of the Gold Monkey (1983) (TV series)
- Voyage of the Rock Aliens (1984)
- The A-Team (1984) (TV series)
- Gus Brown and the Midnight Brewster (1985) (TV movie)
- Scarecrow and Mrs. King (1985-86) (TV series)
- Sidekicks (1986) (TV series)
- Born to Race (1988)
- Hunter (1988-89) (TV series)
- Riding the Edge (1989)
- Sky High (1990) (TV movie)
- Berlin Break (1993) (TV series)
- Beverly Hills, 90210 (1995-96) (TV series)
- Second Chances (1998)
- Born to Ride (2011)
