= Game for Vultures =

- American poster
- Directed by: James Fargo
- Written by: Philip Baird
- Based on: a novel by Michael Hartmann
- Produced by: Hazel Adair
- Starring: Richard Harris; Richard Roundtree; Denholm Elliott; Joan Collins
- Cinematography: Alex Thomson
- Edited by: Peter Tanner
- Music by: Tony Duhig; Jon Field
- Distributed by: Columbia Pictures; Ster-Kinekor Film Distribution Co (South Africa)
- Release date: 13 September 1979
- Running time: 113 minutes
- Country: United Kingdom
- Language: English
- Budget: $5 million

Game for Vultures is a 1979 British thriller film starring Richard Harris, Joan Collins, and Richard Roundtree. It was directed by James Fargo and based on the 1975 novel with the same name by Michael Hartmann set during the Rhodesian Bush War.

== Plot ==
During the late 1970s, as the Rhodesian Bush War reached its height, arms dealer David Swansey (Richard Harris) is a "sanctions-busting" specialist, one of many who keeps the Rhodesian Security Forces supplied through black-market purchases despite an extensive international arms embargo. Swansey's latest assignment is to arrange the illicit purchase of military helicopters, which he acquires in the form of surplus Bell UH-1s being auctioned from a United States Air Force base in West Germany. However, word of this transaction is soon leaked to a foreign office of the Zimbabwe African National Union (ZANU), which applies strong political pressure in an attempt to kill the deal in its cradle. Due to this, the helicopters are barred from reaching Rhodesia and are instead diverted to neighbouring South West Africa, then administered by South Africa.

Meanwhile, Gideon Marunga (Roundtree) is a guerrilla fighter in the Zimbabwe African National Liberation Army (ZANLA), ZANU's armed wing. Marunga learns that the South African authorities are going to allow Swansey and the Rhodesian Special Air Service to stage a mock raid on the airfield where the helicopters are being stored, with the intention of loading them onto Douglas C-47 Dakotas bound for Rhodesia. On the day of the raid, Marunga arrives at the airfield and stalls the Rhodesian troops, while his accomplices succeed in destroying half of the helicopters. In the ensuing battle, he comes face-to-face with Swansey, and the two men share a weary moment of reflection on their stalemate before abruptly parting ways.

The international fallout from the helicopter affair exposes Swansey's illegal activities, and he finds himself unable to continue conducting business outside Rhodesia. He decides to permanently settle there and pursue a normal life, but is immediately conscripted into the security forces. The film closes as Marunga and Swansey confront each other on the battlefield again—this time through the sights of their rifles.

== Cast ==
- Richard Harris as David Swansey
- Richard Roundtree as Gideon Marunga
- Denholm Elliott as Raglan Thistle
- Joan Collins as Nicolle
- Ray Milland as Colonel Brettle
- Sven-Bertil Taube as Larry Prescott
- Ken Gampu as Sixpence
- Tony Osoba as Daniel "Danny" Batten
- Neil Hallett as Tony Knight
- Mark Singleton as Sir Benjamin Peckover
- Alibe Parsons as Alice Kamore
- Victor Melleney as Mallan
- Jana Cilliers as Ruth Swansey
- John Parsonson as Peter Swansey
- Elaine Proctor as Brigid
- Chris Chittell as McAllister
- Graham Armitage as Harken
- Ndaba Mhlongo as Chowa
- Ian Steadman as Du Preez
- Wilson Dunster as Uffa
- Peter van Dissel as Van Rensburg

== Production ==
Game for Vultures was the first British film about the Rhodesian Bush War.

The film was mostly shot in South Africa, near Pretoria and Johannesburg. Filming in Rhodesia itself was decided against because of security concerns and the potential violation of sanctions.

"I'm not a politician", said producer Hazel Adair. Director James Fargo concurred: "I'm not a political person at all. I never thought about Africa until I started to make a film... The audience will come away with the idea that neither side is right."

"It's a movie in which there are no real bad guys or good guys", said Fargo. "Nobody really wins in the end and everybody loses, like in the real Rhodesia."

During filming in South Africa, Roundtree tried to purchase some alcoholic drinks, but was refused service because of his skin colour.

== Soundtrack ==
The music was composed by Tony Duhig and Jon Field, who together comprised the British group Jade Warrior.

== Reception ==
The film was meant to have its world premiere in Johannesburg on 22 June 1979, but the film was banned by South African government censors, who deemed it a threat to state security. In addition, this film was overtaken by actual events, as the war came to an end before the film reached wide distribution. It had some success in video sales, on VHS and in a DVD Region 2 release.

== Versions, censorship, and home media ==
The original cinema release of the film was 113m 07s, having been awarded an X certificate by the British Board of Film Censorship. This version was initially released on PAL VHS and Betamax video cassette formats by RCA Columbia in 1986, running to 108m 32s due to PAL speed-up, with an 18 certificate. In 2006, it was cut to 102m 47s minutes for home release (equivalent to 107m, 04s in the cinema) with a 15 certificate. Cuts include an injured soldier being run over by the disabled Land Rover during the early ambush, and the scene towards the end in which Danny Batten confronts and stabs his sister, before he himself is killed with a garden fork, which may have been removed to achieve the lower certificate, while other cuts appear to be for other reasons, such as when Raglan Thistle attends a pro-Zimbabwe demonstration in Hyde Park. Subsequent home and VOD releases have been this cut version.
