= List of Walker, Texas Ranger characters =

This is a list of characters from the TV series Walker, Texas Ranger.

== Main characters ==
=== Cordell Walker ===
Portrayed by	Seasons	No. of episodes	First Appearance	Final appearance
Chuck Norris	Pilot Season-8 and Trial by Fire	198	One Riot, One Ranger	Trial By Fire

Cordell Firewalker, as Texas Ranger Sgt. Cordell Walker, is a former dolphin trainer with an elite Force Reconnaissance unit and a modern-day Ranger who believes in the Code of the Old West. He is a decorated Vietnam vet and a martial arts expert. He lived with his parents John and Elizabeth Firewalker, until the age of 12, when they were senselessly murdered by a trio of white supremacists. He was then sent to live on a Cherokee reservation with his paternal uncle Ray. On the reservation, the young Cordell lived a hard life, especially with some peers who bullied him, until one day, Billy Grey Wolf intervened and defended Walker causing the two to become "blood brothers". His name in Cherokee language is Washoe, which means "lone eagle". As an adult, after winning a world championship kickboxing title, Cordell enlisted in the U.S. Marines leaving for Vietnam. Upon his return, he joined DPS and then the Texas Rangers as a sergeant, earning numerous honors.

As a Texas Ranger, Walker opposes vigilantism, yet thinks nothing of bending any regulations which complicate his own pursuit of a criminal. Walker's customized pickup truck often doubles as a paddy wagon.

In the series pilot, Walker's partner Bob Mobley is murdered during a robbery. Then Walker meets pro-athlete-turned-rookie-Ranger James Trivette, who remains his partner and close confidante throughout the series.

Due to his Cherokee heritage (or so he claims), Walker sometimes has premonitions of investigations (usually if all else fails); his intuition always proves correct. In addition to martial arts, Walker is proficient in rodeo shows and individual episodes show he is efficient in apparently limitless abilities, such as flying helicopters and airplanes, replacing a Formula One driver and resolving various types of disasters. Despite his physical skills and moral soundness (expanded in the Chuck Norris Facts), which shows in most of the episodes, is sometimes saved or at least helped by his partner Trivette or other characters. In the episode, "Vision Quest", Walker falls into depression momentarily after losing his eyesight courtesy of a bomb, and upon learning the damage could be permanent, considers resigning from the Rangers, until Chief White Eagle and Alex help him to adapt to his disability until his eyesight returns.

Walker has some occasional romantic rapports in the early seasons of the series, such as in the episode "The Right Man at the Wrong Time" where he falls in love with a singer, and defends her from her ex-husband, and also hit by a veterinarian in a veterinary leg confiding uncle Ray. He was also briefly involved with a handicapped young woman named Robin. "Days Past" reveals that Walker was about to get married ten years prior, but his girlfriend Ellen Garrett, was killed in an ambush set up by criminal Vince Pike. Upset over Ellen's death, Cordell never told anyone about it (the affair is in fact told to Trivette and Alex by CD) and only at the end of the episode, after re-arresting Pike, he, with Alex's support, manages to truly make peace with Ellen's death.

In later seasons, he develops feelings for, dates, becomes engaged to, and ultimately marries the deputy district attorney Alexandra "Alex" Cahill. In the series finale, the Walkers welcome their first child: daughter Angela, whose name is a possible nod to Norris's 1988 movie Hero and the Terror.

=== James Trivette ===
Portrayed by	Seasons	First Appearance	Final appearance	No. of episodes
Clarence Gilyard	Pilot Season-8, Trial by Fire (cameo)	One Riot, One Ranger	Trial By Fire	174

James Trivette, commonly known as "Jimmy" or "Go Long Trivette" (during his time in the Dallas Cowboys), is Walker's partner. He grew up in Baltimore, Maryland, and has an older brother named Simon, who appears in the episode "Brothers in Arms". As a young man he was a famous football player, and he was a member of the Dallas Cowboys until a shoulder injury ended his career. He later entered the Texas Rangers and became a colleague of Walker in the first episode of the series, "One Riot, One Ranger in Fort Worth". Trivette takes the place of Walker's old partner Bob Mobley who was killed during a robbery in the same episode. However, in the episode "Till Death Do Us Part", in which Walker ends up in a coma and his friends recall some of their greatest memories of him, it turns out their first meeting had taken place during a riot: while trying to calm the crowd, Trivette was ambushed and nearly killed, but was saved by his future partner. Walker's gruff character makes it difficult with their initial partnership, and Trivette is forced to work hard to gain his respect and trust, but they later become good friends. Trivette is very computer savvy, but sometimes mocks the fact that Walker knows more about him without the use of technology. Regarding C.D. Parker, he sometimes has some quarrels about his chili. but they are still good friends, with Trivette even giving him the nickname "Big Dog".

Trivette shows great professionalism and commitment to his work as a ranger, but is generally less skilled than Walker, in highlighting the qualities of his partner; on several occasions he ends up injured and Walker is left to complete his mission without him. Being quite touchy, he is sometimes the butt of jokes by Walker or CD or Alex, or is involuntarily involved in comic situations of various kinds. However, Trivette gets a bigger role in several episodes in which Walker is away with another case or other kind of business, and is the star of the episodes. He also had faced several legal problems, such as in "Trust No One" in which he is accused of having pocketed part of the spoils of a robbery, and in "The Hands of God", where he seemingly injured a little boy during a shootout, and in both cases, Walker never lost his faith in his partner, and Trivette is ultimately proven innocent at the end of both episodes. In addition, in "Justice for All", during their investigation into the death of Otis Gainer, an attorney for serial rapist Slim Jackson, Trivette, along with Sydney and Gage, were facing accusations of police brutality when they went to question Jackson, his friends started the fight, and with the help of his new attorney, Lyle Nugent, they would commit perjury to discredit the three of them to win the civil suit case. In the end, once the truth was confirmed due to the testimony of the slain lawyer's bodyguard, the three got off the hook with Jackson in prison for another attempted rape (due to the father of one of his victims catching him red-handed), and Nugent facing disbarment for his actions.

Trivette is single most of the series, despite occasional romantic attachments in some episodes, such as "Behind the Badge" when he falls for a journalist, but she is forced to leave, or "Angel of Death" Trivette reconnects with Angell his girlfriend in high school, but finds that she is a killer. Angel is also killed at the end of the episode. In the last episode of the series, Trivette meets old girlfriend Erika (who previously appeared in the episode "Justice Delayed") and they decide to get married, despite some initial doubts when Trivette is nearly killed by one of the motorcycle gang who marked him as a target.

=== Alexandra Cahill-Walker ===
Portrayed by	Seasons	First Appearance	Final appearance	No. of episodes
Sheree J. Wilson	Pilot Season-8, Trial by Fire	One Riot, One Ranger	Trial By Fire	186

Alex is a deputy district attorney. Her past is told in a few episodes: she grew up with her mother (who later died), and had clashes with her father Gordon (due to his alcoholism and abandonment) and later with her first husband. This necessity of fighting has affected her character, making it very specific. Alex has great passion for her work, which sometimes puts her in danger; in various episodes, convicted criminals whom she put away ultimately escape or are released. The vengeful ex-convicts then try to kill her. On other occasions, Alex is taken hostage by criminals (not all of whom know she's a prosecutor); this is done often to lure Walker into a trap, but sometimes to keep Alex hidden so she can be framed for another crime. She always remains unharmed since the Rangers, and/or a conveniently-present guest character, save her...usually following the classic Tarzan versus Jane narrative device. On rare occasions, Alex does her part by caring for an injured Walker; yet more frequently she provides him and/or his fellow Rangers with mandates, permits, warrants, and the like (even though the Rangers, especially Walker, tend to sidestep legal procedure and pounce right into action). She and Walker share a passion for horses and protectiveness of minors.

Alex, at the beginning of the series, was just a friend of Walker and the two worked together regularly, despite having had a fight during their first meeting in court, in which Walker was witness to a process of Alex and she doubted that the ranger had been able to stop seven criminals at once. Alex, at the time, was involved with another man in the episode "Borderline", but later became Walker's girlfriend and the two married at the end of the seventh season. She later pregnant in the eighth season and has a daughter, named Angela, in the final episode.

Alex had different interests and stakes various kinds, but in particular was committed to women's rights. In various episodes, she helped victims of sexual assault or domestic violence by their husbands/partners. This passion for feminism is variously explained in the series: In one episode Alex said that her friend was killed by her partner in a dispute, while in "Texas vs. Cahill", she was forced to admit that her ex-boyfriend, under the influence of drugs, had assaulted her years earlier. In the seventh season, following a near-death experience, Alex decided that her work as a deputy prosecutor is not enough to help others and founded a community center, called HOPE (Help Our People Excel), on the advice of Walker, where she helps children and young people in trouble.

=== Francis Gage ===
Portrayed by	Seasons	No. of episodes	First Appearance	Final appearance
Judson Mills	8-9 and Trial by Fire	46	Countdown	Trial By Fire

Francis Gage is a Texas Ranger and makes his first appearance in the second episode of the seventh season of the series, Countdown Part 2. Since then he works with the team of Walker and Trivette, paired with Sydney Cooke. He is very skilled in combat and he never learned to cook. In the episode "Tall Cotton" it is revealed that he has a sister, Julie, who is a journalist. Between Gage and Sydney, there are a lot of similarities, so much so that in some episodes they are almost ready to declare. In the episode "Without Sound", Gage loses his sight and Sydney helped him to cope with this disability until he regained his sight at the end of the episode. This episode displayed the closeness of their duo.

=== Sydney Cooke ===
Portrayed by	Seasons	No. of episodes	First Appearance	Final appearance
Nia Peeples	8-9	47	Countdown	Final Show / Down

Sydney is a Texas Ranger and appears in the second episode of the seventh season in tandem with the Ranger Francis Gage. She's a very skilled in combat and able to defend herself very well. Although sometimes she is captured by criminals, there are several occasions she turns the tables and has to save Gage. Sydney sometimes uses disguises and her charm to attract criminals, but she is single and complains about it occasionally. Sydney mentions in "Wedding Bells Part 2" that she is 32.

=== C.D. “Big Dog” Parker ===
Portrayed by	Seasons	No. of episodes	First Appearance	Final appearance
Gailard Sartain (pilot episode only); Noble Willingham	Season 1 (pilot episode only)-8	155	One Riot, One Ranger	A Matter of Faith

In the eighties, C.D. was a Texas Ranger, and after a long period where he was captain of the rangers as well. He was also partnered with Walker when Walker first joined the Texas Rangers. In the show, he is retired and owns a restaurant in Texas called "C.D.'s Bar and Grill". C.D. aids the rangers throughout the series in their fight against crime and helps put many criminals behind bars.

C.D. disappears from the series halfway through season 7 (due to Noble Willingham leaving the series to run for Congress), with his last appearance being in the Christmas episode "A Matter of Faith". For the rest of the season, he is written to have left on a cruise around the world, which leaves him unable to attend Walker and Alex's wedding in the season finale. He then remains off-screen until the eighth season episode, "The Avenging Angel", when Walker receives a phone call saying that C.D. has died of an apparent heart attack while on a fishing trip. However, in the series finale, it is revealed that C.D. actually died of poisoning by Emile Lavocat, and the symptoms presented as a heart attack.

=== Raymond Firewalker ===
Portrayed by	Seasons	No. of episodes	First Appearance	Final appearance
Floyd Westerman (Season 1 and 2); Apesanahkwat (Season 3)	Season 1-3	16	One Riot, One Ranger	On Sacred Ground

Ray in the series plays the uncle of Cordell Walker. He was the only relative that remained for Walker when his parents died. He was born and raised in the Indian reservation, where Walker grew up learning the traditions of the tribe. His uncle gave him the name of Washoe which means Lone Eagle. Walker's uncle has always been a very friendly and very serious with Walker, although he had not agreed on the choice of his brother to marry a woman who was not Cherokee. Much of the story so far reported is told by Lucas Walker in double episode where the ranger takes custody of an orphan child. Ray lives in the reserve but often staying on the ranch of Walker. Rather old at the beginning of the series, Ray has an active role in the stories but dispenses advice to his nephew and the other characters. He died of a heart attack while in the Indian reservation; reappears in a few episodes in which Walker recalls and recounts his childhood, played by another actor but as a young man. According to the pilot episode, Ray saw service in Africa during World War II when he was stabbed by a German bayonet in 1943.

== Recurring characters ==
- Trent Malloy (James Wlcek) son of a pastor and former martial arts student of Walker. Black belt in Karate and runs both his own Dojo and Protection Agency. Appeared in 13 episodes and appeared in spin-off called Sons of Thunder that was cancelled after 6 episodes. Serves in the United States Army as part of the United States Army Rangers 75th Ranger Regiment. Returns from active duty to rejoin his family for the funeral of his father, Rev. Thunder Malloy, in Season 4 after Thunder suffers a fatal heart attack/stroke while playing baseball with his family and Walker.
- Thomas "Tommy" Joseph Malloy (Shane Meier) the younger brother of Trent. Also a student of Walker.
- Carlos Sandoval (Marco Sanchez) a detective for Dallas PD. Best friend of Trent Malloy. Often teamed up with Walker and Trivette in cases. Appeared in 16 episodes and appeared in spin-off called Sons of Thunder that was cancelled after 6 episodes..
- Joey Prado (John Haymes Newton) a kick-boxer and student of Walkers' who becomes a police officer.
- Maisie Whitman (Gwen Verdon) made her first appearance in Forgotten People; she is a new friend C.D. made while undercover at a nursing home whose doctors and corrupt administrator are suspected of testing illegal Alzheimer's drugs on their elderly patients (so they could find a cure for the disease to make a large profit for themselves). While the rangers sent C.D. in undercover after a friend of Trivette's Josh Leonard was killed by the doctors while trying to tell him what was happening there, Maisie went undercover following the death of a friend of hers Helen Sawyer who had Alzheimer's disease and was able to see through CD's cover from his earlier performance and knew he also did not actually belong there. Before the doctors could give C.D. and Maisie the fatal drugs they used on Josh after they are caught looting the testing room, C.D. was able to alert Walker and Trivette (via a secret transmitter hidden in a bible Walker gave him, transmitted to Walker's pager), who then brought the doctors and their parolee orderly minions down, with Maisie knocking out the administrator. She later appears in Mind Games, where her son, Brian dies, and C.D. decides to investigate what happened noticing some strange occurrences around Brian's death, discovering he was murdered by his treacherous wife Caroline and her secret boyfriend Peter when he found out they were stealing from their family's trust fund, and trying to drug Maisie to make her appear incompetent so they could gain full control over the trust fund. Though they were captured before C.D. could sneak Maisie out of there, it was only thanks to Alex alerting Walker and Trivette to the situation that they were saved and the situation was resolved.
- Josie Martin (Vanessa Paul) Ran 'H.O.P.E.' center created by Alex after a near-death experience. Did not play a major role in her appearances.
- White Eagle (Frank Salsedo) the spiritual leader and faith healer of the Cherokee reservation Walker grew up on, who often aids Walker in spiritual matters. Debuted during Season 3.
- Gordon Cahill (Rod Taylor) the once-estranged father of Alex who works as a Defense Attorney. His alcoholism had driven a wedge between him and Alex. In Redemption, he defends a crime boss named Karl Mayes that Alex is prosecuting though after Mayes has a witness in protective custody killed (by having his lieutenant, Hendricks infiltrate a county lockup disguised as a cop), his ethics as a lawyer cause him to quit out of disgust. Gordon later becomes a key witness and helps Alex convict Mayes after Mayes tried to have him killed (which nullified the attorney-client privilege clause). Despite his estrangement from his daughter, he loves his daughter and works on rebuilding his relationship with her and at the end of that episode agrees to go into an alcohol treatment program. In Texas vs. Cahill, Gordon defends Alex when she is framed for murder of her ex-lover Tony Seville and together with Walker and Trivette, suspected that Lane Tillman, Seville's boss that Alex had been prosecuting framed her in an attempt to avoid a retrial by trying to use Seville's connection to Alex to assert double jeopardy (though he almost fell back into alcoholism when he had self-doubts before Walker stopped him). Once this is successfully proven and Alex is released, Gordon later represents Alex's cellmate, Alfree Grimes, who is later freed and reunited with her daughter. Gordon later attends his daughter's wedding in Wedding Bells, despite having been injured by the same assassin who tried to kill Alex. Gordon is never seen, mentioned, or heard from after Wedding Bells.
- Sam Coyote (Eloy Casados) the sheriff of the Cherokee reservation and a very good friend of Walker.
- Charlie Brooks (Terry Kiser) A wise cracking former mob accountant and witness who Walker protected from hitmen in Mayday. is later given community service in Last Hope, where he helps Walker mentor a group of at risk teens. In Iceman, it is revealed that he bears a similar resemblance to the wanted explosives expert Maxwell Kronert, known by his nickname "the Iceman" (this is not surprising, as Kiser played the Iceman in a dual role). Walker, Trivette and FBI Agent Doug Foster ask him for help in impersonating Kronert in an effort to capture mob boss George Vickers while the real Iceman is recovering in the hospital following an explosive high-speed chase, accidentally killing his wheelman in the process. Wanting to get out of his community service following the events of Last Hope, he agrees. The plan seemed to work out perfectly, until he loses the tracking device Walker used on him; it soon went from bad to worse when the Iceman escaped from the hospital. However, thanks to a clue he provided which allowed Walker to learn where Vicker's planned robbery was occurring, along with the training he underwent by Walker and Foster allowed him to deactivate the bomb and help foil the robbery. After Iceman, Charlie disappeared from the series without explanation.
- Jack "Soldier" Belmont (Burt Young) A homeless veteran who lived on the street with his dog, Lucky. After he becomes a witness to the near murder of a local priest, Walker is aided by Lucky in finding his owner who Walker later helps reunite with his family. In Small Blessings, Soldier and Lucky help Walker track down two orphans who ran away from their foster parents after mistakenly believing they could only afford to keep one of them and ran away to avoid being split up. Soldier later defends the children from a group of criminals led by Tony Chan, who had been running a chain of illegal sweatshops across the country and were the target of an investigation by the Rangers and the FBI, after the children end up witnessing Chan murder one of his workers, and they were almost killed when Chan set an old building they were hiding in on fire, just before Lucky was able to lead Walker back to them. After Chan and his gang are arrested and their sweatshops are shut down, Soldier and Walker return the children to their foster parents.
- Master Rin (John Fujioka) A Buddhist monk and friend of Lama Dolgin who seeks to find the Lama's reincarnation, a young boy named Davey. Appears in Higher Power and Warriors.
- Davey (Sean Carberry) A young boy who is the reincarnation of Lama Dolgin who Master Rin had been seeking. Walker helps Master Rin defend Davey from Chang who is the reincarnation of a man who wants revenge on Lama Dolgin. After saving Davey, the boy goes with Master Rin to live in a Buddhist monastery. Davey returns to Texas with Master Rin as he feels his mother is in danger and Walker finds she has gone missing. It is discovered that while his mother was working as a geneticist, she discovered that Davey has a unique DNA that gives him a form of rapid healing, a discover that a group wishes to use to create an army of genetically superior soldiers. Walker works to rescue Davey's mother from the group while protecting Davey from the group's genetically modified super soldier. Appears in Higher Power and Warriors.
- Roberta "Bobbie" Hunt (Tammy Lauren) A Brookdale, Texas, police officer who becomes a candidate for the Texas Rangers in 99th Ranger, after a Ranger is killed in a shootout. A single mother who in the past was a victim of domestic violence at the hands of her husband. Walker encourages her to continue when she tries to give up on becoming a Ranger, after her violent ex-husband threatens her and her child. After taking down the man who killed her predecessor, and later her ex-husband, Hunt ultimately gets the job. In A Father's Image, she goes undercover as a tutor for the young son of a crime boss, in order to gather evidence on his dad's illegal activities. Hunt is never heard from, seen, or mentioned again after this episode. Her name is a possible reference to Stakeout writer Jim Kouf, who sold a number of scripts under the name "Bob Hunt".
- Alfree Grimes (Silvia Moore) Alex's cellmate in Texas vs. Cahill who befriends Alex and protects Alex from the other inmates. She reveals to Alex she was single mother who was wrongfully imprisoned for drugs found in her car that were not hers and given hard time. After being cleared for murder, Alex convinces her father to take Alfree's case and she is eventually released from prison and is reunited with her daughter. In A Woman's Place, Alfree gets a job as a construction worker and is appalled by the unsafe construction practices, as her father had been killed years earlier in a construction accident due unsafe practices. She becomes a whistle blower after she is blamed for an accident that injures her coworker friend. This puts her, her daughter, and her mother in danger from the small group of construction workers responsible for the unsafe practices and the accident that injured her friend who were trying to silence her to prevent their company owner from learning of their secret money-making scam. With Walker and Alex's help, they are brought down. She later gets a job as the new building inspector (as the previous building inspector was part of the plot who was seen taking bribes).
- Doug Foster (Charles Homet) is an FBI Agent who has oftentimes assisted the rangers in high-profile cases and vice-versa, ranging from Randy Shrader ("Codename: Dragonfly") to Taylor Griffith ("Cyclone") to Tony Chan ("Small Blessings") to the Soldiers of the New Millennium ("Soldiers of Hate").
- Rhonda Guitre (Ely Pouget)
- Dr. Brown (Todd Terry)
- Marta Esperanza Lopez (Melinda Ramos) is the mother of Ernesto and Tommy Lopez.
- Ernesto Lopez (Julio Cedillo) was the eldest son of Joe and Marta Lopez. He was formerly a member of a street gang known as the Vatos Locos, but turned his life around with Walker's karate classes, and eventually landed a job at Phil's Garage working on cars. During the events of "The Covenant", the members of his former gang shot him in a drive-by shooting and tried to pin the blame on a rival gang, as well as get his younger brother, Tommy, recruited, until a ballistics investigation cleared things up. It was after his near-death experience, Ernesto joined the United States Marine Corps. Later, in "Code of Silence", Ernesto had fallen in love with a Congressman's daughter who was recently accepted to Harvard Law School, but he was also accused of rape after the victim mistakenly picked him off in a police lineup. Ernesto was afraid to tell Walker and Alex where he really was the night of rape because he was afraid of upsetting the Congressman, but Walker and Alex promised not to tell anyone, not to mention they had a DNA test prove that he was, in fact, innocent of the crime. However, Walker was too late to tell Ernesto and Marta the good news, as Ernesto ended up being killed by a trio of dirty cops from the Brookdale Police Department, who have been targeting and murdering criminals who get off due to technicalities and did not check that Ernesto was innocent, even after Walker warned the trio that their extremist actions would result in an innocent person being killed. However, the three dirty cops die, including one who commits suicide, during their attempt to murder Walker to prevent him from issuing a warrant against them.
- Tommy Lopez (Boris Cabrera) is the younger son of Marta and Joe Lopez and younger brother of Ernesto Lopez. Like Ernesto before him, Tommy was also enrolled in Walker's "Kick Drugs" Karate Program. He greatly disliked his father, even after he was released on parole. Ultimately, Tommy was able to forgive Joe, due to both Joe taking a bullet for him, and learning from Walker that Joe only got involved in another robbery to help Walker bust the gang behind the robbery.
- Joe Lopez (Danny Trejo) is the estranged father of Ernesto and Tommy Lopez and husband of Marta Lopez. Joe was a skilled safecracker, and while Walker didn't know Joe personally at the time of his arrest, he does remember how said arrest occurred: Joe was apprehended after crashing his getaway car into a tree trying to avoid hitting a group of children playing in the street. Joe, as a result, served a sentence of 10-15 years in prison (without knowing about Ernesto's death), and then ended up spending the rest of his sentence at a halfway house and having landed a job as a dishwasher at Marta's newly-opened Mexican restaurant. However, the halfway house was also home to a gang of robbers Walker and Trivette have been tracking for months prior to Joe's parole, and when the group forced Joe to partake in their latest heist, they wouldn't take no for an answer. However, Joe wanted to stay straight for his family's sake and repair his strained relationship with Tommy, having agreed to participate in the robbery only so he could help Walker and Trivette bust the gang by finding out who their leader is, who turned out to be his parole officer, Buck Coburn, of all people. Joe was later granted a pardon by the Governor for testifying against his housemates.
