= Tom Campanaro =

Tom Campanaro is an American bodybuilder and health and fitness personality. As of 2013 he is the president and CEO of Total Gym. He was a competitive bodybuilder in the 1970s and founded Total Gym in 1974 with Dale McMurray and Doug Marino. Along with Larry Westfall they developed the Total Gym trainer, geared towards training all muscle groups. He was inducted into the National Fitness Hall of Fame in 2013.
