= Chuck Norris facts =

Humorous factoids about American actor

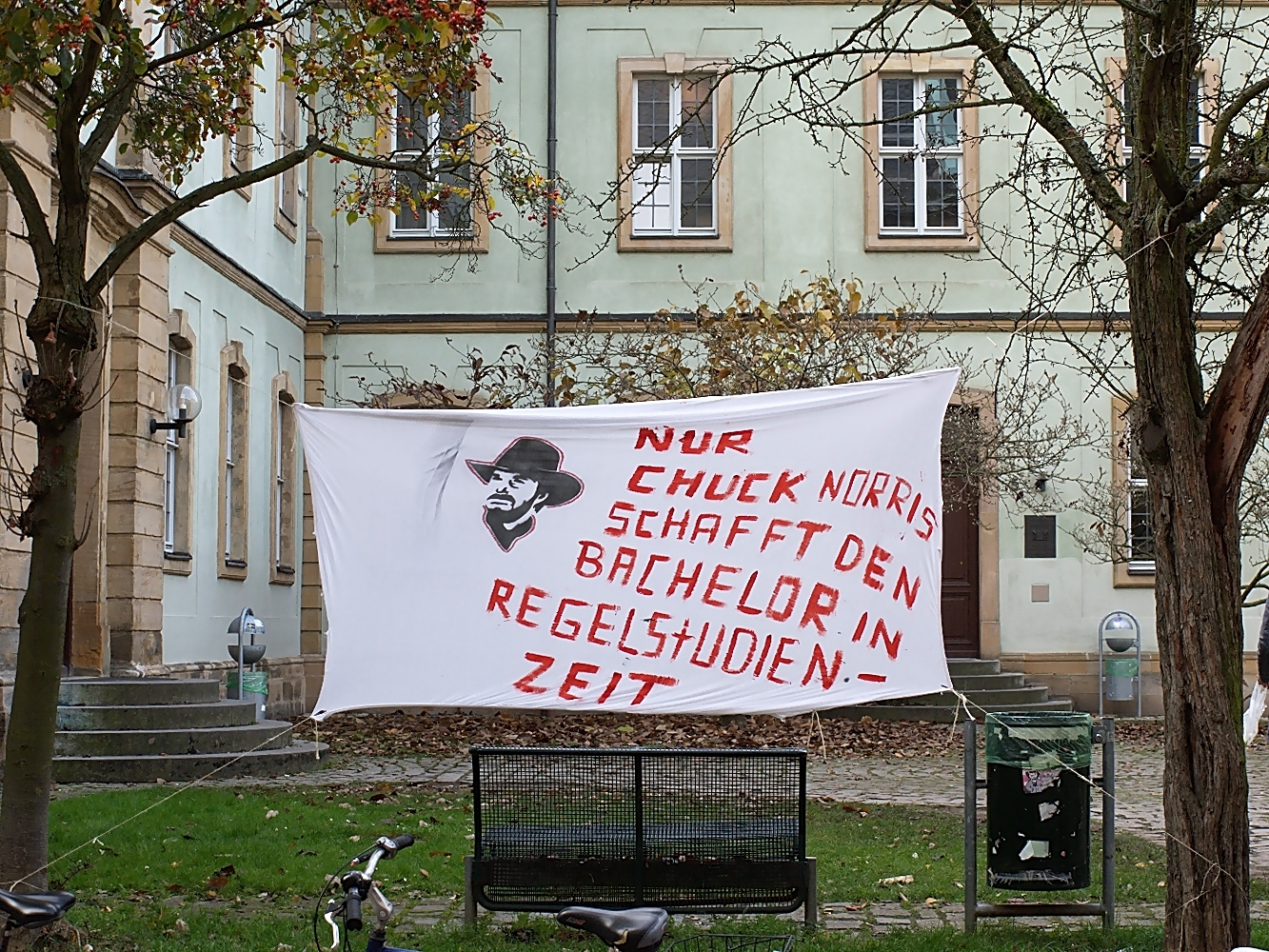
Protest banner at the University of Bamberg alluding to Chuck Norris facts (German: "Only Chuck Norris manages to achieve a bachelor's degree in scheduled time")

"Chuck Norris facts", also known as Chuck Norris jokes, are humorous factoids about the late American martial artist and actor Chuck Norris that have become an Internet meme widespread in popular culture. These "facts" are absurd, hyperbolic claims about Norris's skills, toughness, attitude, sophistication, and masculinity.

Chuck Norris facts have spread internationally, making translations and spawning localized versions about country-specific advertisements and other Internet memes. Some facts allude to his use of roundhouse kicks for seemingly any task, his large amount of body hair with specific regard to his beard, and his role in the action television series Walker, Texas Ranger. Chuck Norris jokes follow a similar format to "yo mama" jokes, where the humor comes from an absurd exaggeration.

== Background ==
Chuck Norris facts originally appeared on the Internet in early 2005, though jokes surrounding Norris's toughness and strength are claimed to have existed since the 1980s. Initially distributed in the Something Awful forums, the "facts" centered on Vin Diesel, in response to his film The Pacifier. After a few months, forum members chose Chuck Norris to be the new subject. Conan O'Brien's Chuck Norris jokes on Late Night with Conan O'Brien (which generally center on Walker, Texas Ranger) have been seen as an inspiration for the fad. The exaggerated style of these claims is similar to a recurring Saturday Night Live sketch called "Bill Brasky". Due to the popularity of this phenomenon, similar jokes have been created for various other celebrities, as well as fictional characters.

Humorist Ian Spector has been credited as "the author of Chuck Norris facts" due to his role in creating online Chuck Norris fact generators. Spector has also written several books of Chuck Norris facts, including The Truth About Chuck Norris: 400 Facts About the World's Greatest Human (2007) and Chuck Norris Vs. Mr. T: 400 Facts About the Baddest Dudes in the History of Ever (2008).

== Norris's response ==
Norris responded to the Chuck Norris facts on his official website with a statement. Admitting some of the statements were indeed humorous, he said he tried not to take any of them seriously, and he hoped that such statements would interest people in real facts about him contained in his literary works.

In December 2007, Norris filed suit against Penguin USA, the publisher that had released The Truth About Chuck Norris through its Gotham Books imprint. Norris alleged that the book contained "trademark infringement, unjust enrichment and privacy rights". Norris dropped the lawsuit in 2008.

On October 7, 2009, Tyndale House Publishers issued The Official Chuck Norris Fact Book, which was co-written and officially endorsed by Norris.

== Prominent mentions ==
In the March 20, 2006 issue, Time magazine interviewed Norris, calling him an "online cult hero". In the answer to their last question, he called the Chuck Norris Facts "weird but wildly popular sayings" and quoted one: "Chuck Norris can divide by zero."

In 2011, a commercial for World of Warcraft featured Chuck Norris and included its own "Chuck Norris facts" in the dialogue.

In the 2012 movie The Expendables 2, there is a wink at Chuck Norris facts when one is attributed to Norris's character Booker. In one scene Booker saves Barney Ross's (Sylvester Stallone) team in a firefight. After introductions all around, Ross says to Booker, "I heard another rumor. That you were bitten by a king cobra." "Yeah, I was", Booker replies, adding: "But after five days of agonizing pain, the cobra died."

In 2017, UnitedHealthCare released an ad in which two men in a diner spot Norris in the establishment and begin exchanging hyperbolic "facts" about him, such as "Chuck Norris wears a hat to protect the sun from him." One of the men then throws a salt shaker at Norris to test his martial arts prowess, and winds up needing medical attention as a result – the whole being an instance of UHC's Cannes Lions International Festival of Creativity-award-winning "Ways In" campaign.

== Inspirations and similar trends ==
From 2006 to 2018, Dos Equis beer ran a successful advertising campaign entitled "The Most Interesting Man in the World" featuring actor Jonathan Goldsmith which also became a popular Internet meme. His "facts" included changing foreign policy through his small talk, slamming a revolving door, and parallel-parking a train. He once cheated death and death didn't mind. Upon his retirement from the role his last ad stated "His only regret is not knowing what regret feels like".

During the 2012 Armenian parliamentary election, some ballots with Norris's name written on them as a candidate were found.

In Egypt, and prior to the Egyptian presidential election, 2012, similar jokes were made upon Omar Suleiman, the ex-director of the General Intelligence Directorate in the same style of Chuck Norris facts, making fun of the powers and skills that his supporters claimed to be his to promote him before the elections.

In the episode "The Weird World of Wyrm" of the 2012 CGI series version of Teenage Mutant Ninja Turtles, a holographic Chris Bradford – a parody of Norris – delivers a Norris Facts-esque quotation: "Chris Bradford fact #48: Chris Bradford always carries around four weapons of mass destruction: His arms and his legs."

Buffalo Bills fans began promoting similar tall tales about former linebacker Kiko Alonso during the 2013 season, after Alonso joined the team as a rookie. The tall tales were collectively known as "The Legend of Kiko Alonso".

Makmende, a Kenyan fictional hero, has been purported to perform locally related feats and more, including in Sheng.

In 2006, a naming poll was held to decide the name of a new bridge in Hungary. Since nominations were accepted from everyone, "Chuck Norris" soon became the top candidate for the bridge's name (beating the names of several historical figures along with candidates like David Hasselhoff and Eric Cartman), before being taken over by Stephen Colbert after he called on his fans to vote. The bridge was eventually named Megyeri Bridge.

In 2014, after Argentina reached the final of the FIFA World Cup in Brazil, memes containing Chuck Norris facts directed at defensive midfielder Javier Mascherano emerged on social media. Similar "facts" were attributed to another soccer player, Zlatan Ibrahimović.

WWE wrestler Brian Myers, known as Curt Hawkins, incorporated the Chuck Norris facts into his gimmick in August 2016, where he uses his name instead of Norris, e.g., "Children have to put sunscreen on at the beach to protect themselves from Curt Hawkins".

In India, there exist similar jokes in the form of factoids and quotes about Indian film actor Rajinikanth which are widely circulated in text messages and memes over the Internet. These satirical jokes have also inspired several mobile applications for iOS and Android. The factoids about Rajinikanth are inspired by Chuck Norris facts in that those follow the same pattern as Chuck Norris facts. While some Rajinikanth jokes are original, many of them are circulated with Norris's name replaced by Rajinikanth's. Chuck vs Rajini, a 2012 promotional animated video by Expedia, played on the jokes by pitting Norris against Rajini. The beginning of 2013 saw similar cluster of jokes gaining trend in the country on Indian cricketer Ravindra Jadeja after Indian cricket captain Mahendra Singh Dhoni tweeted a few "facts" about him on his Twitter page.

== Examples ==
- "They tried to put Chuck Norris's face on Mount Rushmore, but the granite wasn't tough enough for his beard." – Stated by Norris to be his personal favorite "fact".
- "There is no such thing as evolution, only a list of species Chuck Norris has allowed to live." – Upon hearing this "fact", Norris responded by revealing that he was a creationist.

== Video games based on trend ==
In 2008, Gameloft produced Chuck Norris: Bring On the Pain, a video game for mobile devices, based on the online Norris cult elicited by Chuck Norris facts. The player takes control of Norris in a side-scrolling beat 'em up. The game was well-reviewed.

In 2017, Flaregames produced the second such game, Non Stop Chuck Norris, an isometric action-role playing game for mobile devices, also well reviewed.

== Bibliography ==
- Ian Spector: The Truth About Chuck Norris: New York: Gotham Books: 2007: ISBN 1-59240-344-1
- Chuck Norris & Todd DuBord: The Official Chuck Norris Fact Book: 101 of Chuck's Favorite Facts and Stories: Tyndale House Publishers: 2009: ISBN 1-4143-3449-4

== See also ==
- Bill Brasky
- The Stig
- The Most Interesting Man in the World
- Walker, Texas Ranger
