= Forest Warrior =

1996 film by Aaron Norris

- Promotional release poster
- Directed by: Aaron Norris
- Written by: Ron Swanson; Galen Thompson
- Produced by: Andy Howard
- Starring: Chuck Norris; Terry Kiser; Max Gail
- Cinematography: João Fernandes
- Edited by: Marcus Manton Christopher Hammer
- Music by: Bill Elliott
- Production company: Nu Image
- Distributed by: Turner Entertainment
- Release date: November 5, 1996
- Running time: 93 minutes
- Country: United States
- Language: English

Forest Warrior is a 1996 American adventure film starring Chuck Norris and directed by Norris's brother Aaron Norris. The film was released on direct-to-video in the United States on November 5, 1996.

== Plot ==
Clovis Madison tells a campfire story to a group of children, about frontiersman Jebediah McKenna who was killed a century ago in the Tanglewood forest by armed men after refusing to sell his land to a lumber company. McKenna was magically brought back to life and given the power to transform into a bear, wolf, or eagle. Inspired by this tale, the children dub their group the Lords of the Tanglewood, complete with the following pledge: "We ask you to leave it pure as found; for we are to it forever bound."

In the present day, the Tanglewood forest is targeted for harvesting by a logging conglomerate directed by sinister lumber magnate Travis Thorne. Most of the small town is against their deforestation, including the kids, who regularly camp out in a treehouse in the woods. During one of their trips, a group of loggers bully the kids, only to get beaten up by McKenna, who also happens to be a master of Native American martial arts. The loggers report this to Thorne, who orders the treehouse destroyed. While the kids are gone, the loggers place a bomb in the treehouse, unaware that the Tanglewood Lords' leader - and sole female member - Austene Slaighter is still there. McKenna beats up the loggers again, then uses the forest's magic to resurrect Austene just like he had been.

Austene is reunited with her father Arlen, once the town's deputy sheriff but now its token drunk. Meanwhile, Thorne is finally granted approval by the town to bring in his lumber crew. The Lords of the Tanglewood rally in response to this; they distract the loggers with numerous boobytraps, impeding Thorne's efforts to chop down the forest. They also play rock music on a ghetto-blaster, which causes the loggers to dance around idiotically. Finally, McKenna appears before Thorne and intimidates him by turning into a bear; the cowardly villain calls off the deforestation and confesses all of his wrongdoing to the authorities. With their forest saved, the townspeople rebuild the kids' treehouse while Austene sees McKenna's spirit reunited with that of his Native American wife.

== Cast ==
- Chuck Norris as Jebediah McKenna
- Terry Kiser as Travis Thorne
- Max Gail as Sheriff Ramsey
- Michael Beck as Arlen Slaighter
- Roscoe Lee Browne as Clovis Madison
- Loretta Swit as Shirley
- Megan Paul as Austene Slaighter
- George Buck Flower as Barney
- Rags the bear cub as Himself

== Production ==
=== Filming ===
The film was shot in Oregon in 56 days from January 14 until March 10, 1996.

== Reception ==
=== Critical response ===
Doug Walker, aka the Nostalgia Critic, has called the picture "a must-see for anybody who refuses to believe there are worse roles an actor can get stuck with than that of a corpse (referring to Terry Kiser's deceased title character in Weekend at Bernie's)."

New Zealand film critic Richard Scheib, described the film as "...A desperate and ungainly attempt by Chuck Norris to reinvent himself as anything other than a one-dimensional macho-man (in this case, as a liberal eco-defender), with woeful results. Norris possesses all the acting ability of a tree-trunk; he simply doesn't have the range for something like this, despite going a step beyond The Lorax -- who merely spoke for the trees, while Norris clobbers and terrorizes for them outright. This film takes its whole quasi-Sierra Club/Green-consciousness thing far too seriously. The reverence-for-the-land solemnity becomes absurd: the bad guys are blatant caricatures, being constantly associated with ecologically-unfriendly montages (smoke-belching trucks and factories, trees being mulched, etcetera); there are also lots of cute animals, with Rags the bear-cub giving a better performance than any of the human leads...The third act descends into Home Alone-style slapstick, with lots of childish sadism against the shallow and buffoonish heavies, all in the name of environmentalism...Although his name sells (or at least is supposed to sell) the movie, Norris stays off-screen for most of the running time; the film primarily concerns itself with the juvenile "Lords of Tanglewood" playing in their treehouse and gleefully torturing the inept, brain-dead villains."

=== Accolades ===
Young Artist Awards

- 1997: Nominated, "Best Performance in a TV Movie/Home Video by a Young Ensemble" – Trenton Knight, Megan Paul, Josh Wolford, Michael Friedman, and Jordan Brower

== See also ==
- List of American films of 1996
- Chuck Norris filmography
