= Kickstart Kids =

Martial arts program formed by Chuck Norris

- Formation: August 16, 1990; 36 years ago
- Founder: Chuck Norris
- Type: Non-profit organization
- Purpose: Building strong moral character in our youth through martial arts
- Headquarters: 10222 Westheimer Road
- Location: Houston, Texas, United States
- Region served: Texas
- Members: Middle school & High school students
- Official language: English
- CEO: Chuck Norris
- Key people: Chuck Norris, co-chair Gena Norris, co-chair
- Staff: 87
- Website: www.kickstartkids.org

Kickstart Kids is a martial arts character development program non-profit organization, formed by Chuck Norris on August 16, 1990 as the Kick Drugs Out of America Foundation.

== History ==
On August 16, 1990, the Kick Drugs out of America Foundation (dba Kickstart Kids) was formed by martial artist, actor and philanthropist, Chuck Norris. He wanted to provide a martial arts program that came at no cost to the students, a program that would teach kids all the valiant traits the martial arts has to offer.

In 1992, with the help of former President George H. W. Bush, the program was officially implemented in four schools in the Houston area: Burbank, Central, Hamilton, and Hogg.

Today, the program operates in over 59 schools throughout Texas. The program is taught in mostly middle/junior high schools and some high schools. They currently serve more than 9,500 of today's youth, making a positive impact in their lives by teaching character through karate.

In 2003, the foundation was renamed to Kickstart Kids (it still maintains its official name as Kick Drugs Out of America Foundation, but now it has added a "dba" – doing business as – Kickstart Kids).

The stated mission of Kickstart Kids is to teach character through karate to empower youth with core values, such as discipline and respect, to achieve their greatest potential. Kickstart is a center for kids to defend themselves at any moment in need.
