= Total Gym =

Line of fitness training equipment

- Type: Fitness training equipment
- Inventor: Tom Campanaro
- Inception: 1974
- Website: totalgym.com

Total Gym is a fitness equipment brand created by Tom Campanaro and Doug Marino in 1974. It was founded in San Diego, California. Total Gym is marketed and sold by brands Total Gym Commercial, Ltd., and Total Gym Fitness.

== History ==
Campanero and Marino designed the first Total Gym incline trainer in 1974. In 1976, Dale McMurray and Larry Westfall were brought on as additional business partners. In that same year, the first Total Gym TV commercial hit the market. In 1988, Total Gym moved into the physical therapy field, and as of February 2022 most or all of the home equipment line is made in China.

=== Infomercial ===
In 1996, Campanaro made a deal with American Telecast Products to produce the first Total Gym infomercial, which featured Chuck Norris and Christie Brinkley as spokespersons.

== Success ==
Total Gym has become one of the longest-running fitness infomercials in history. The company's infomercials are broadcast to over 85 countries, with more than 4 million units sold.
