= Chuck Norris: Bring On the Pain =

2008 video game

Chuck Norris: Bring on the Pain
- Developer: Gameloft
- Publisher: Gameloft
- Platforms: iPhone, J2ME, Brew, BlackBerry
- Release: August 2008
- Genre: Beat 'em up
- Mode: Single-player

Chuck Norris: Bring on the Pain is a 2008 mobile game produced by Gameloft, based on the popularity of film actor Chuck Norris developed on the internet with the Chuck Norris facts. The player takes control of Chuck Norris himself. The game is a side-scrolling beat 'em up.

== Plot ==
Chuck Norris: Bring on the Pain! is a tongue in cheek tribute to the actor. The game takes place in a day's work for Chuck as he rescues POWs from Cambodia and fights off Communist invaders in the USA. The game is littered with Chuck Norris facts and incorporates a number of these into the gameplay; such as shooting down a helicopter by pointing his finger and yelling BANG!

== Gameplay ==
Players use the on-screen joystick to move Chuck and the punch button to attack. Like other side scrolling beat 'em ups, the player can utilize the environment around them, picking up different objects, such as cars, to use against the enemy. Later in the game, players begin to unlock combos and special moves which they can link together for some devastating attacks. It includes 13 levels of Chuck sorting out business, set across Asia, Texas and New York.

== Platforms ==
Chuck Norris: Bring On the Pain is a video game released for mobile devices such as BlackBerry, HTC, LG, Motorola, Nokia, Pantech, Samsung, and Sony Ericsson.

== Reception ==
Damian Chiappara of APPSPY gave it a score of 4/5 stating: "The game has a wicked sense of humour and a ton of references that Chuck Norris fans will love. The visuals themselves are very smooth and look great, but the game also features a fun camera function to post your face onto the enemy trooper's body... Chuck Norris: Bring on the Pain, is a tongue in cheek tribute to the legend himself while maintaining some solid side-scrolling beat 'em up gameplay."

Andrew Williams of Know Your Mobile wrote: "The game is great fun purely from a gameplay perspective, with its frequent seamless mini game interludes offering a break from the action. However, the humour of Chuck Norris: Bring on the Pain is a huge part of the game's appeal."

Meghann Myers of PC World wrote: "Chuck Norris: Bring on the Pain is not only uncomplicated to play but perfectly ridiculous in its campiness. At $1, the game is cheap, fun, and an extraordinary time-waster. Money well spent for the Chuck Norris enthusiast, or anyone looking for a good laugh."
