= Black Belt Patriotism: How to Reawaken America =

2008 book by Chuck Norris

- Author: Chuck Norris
- Language: English
- Genre: non-fiction, politics
- Publisher: Regnery Publishing
- Publication date: September 8, 2008
- Publication place: United States

Black Belt Patriotism: How to Reawaken America is a non-fiction book by Chuck Norris, an American martial arts expert, actor, and conservative activist. It was published on September 8, 2008, by Regnery Publishing. The book reached number 14 on the New York Times Best Seller list in September 2008, staying on the list one week.

== Overview ==
Black Belt Patriotism is Chuck Norris's critique of what he argues is destroying the US, and provides suggestions for rebuilding America and restoring the American dream, both of which he perceives as needed, in ways that he would support. He explains that it is 'black belt' in the sense that it is strong, resolute and to the point, like a roundhouse kick. He further explains, it is 'patriotic' in the sense that it recaptures the vision of America's Founding Fathers. Norris wrote this book in the hope that future generations of Americans can continue to enjoy life, liberty, and the pursuit of happiness.

The book includes Norris's eight-point political program, which he perceives to be following the teachings of the Founding Fathers of the United States.

The book begins with a chapter called "One Nation, Divided, and Without a Clue", which summarizes eight perceived threats to the culture and politics of the United States. It then goes on to detail the problems and the author's solution to them, in as many chapters:

- first, a loss of connection to and sense of the Founders' America and their legacy, then
- uncontrolled over-spending and an aggravated debt burden, both nationally and personally,
- too much fluidity and too little protection along the Union's borders,
- loss of moral direction within the society, and the need to return to what Norris sees as the Founders' vision of civil life,
- the idea that Americans have lost a sense of human value and its emotional underpinnings, leading to mistreatment of others,
- concern over the way civil responsibility is passed from one generation to the next,
- the dissolution of the nuclear family as an ideal, and
- the idea that physical, mental, and spiritual apathy has become the norm in the American society, with negative consequences.

He quotes Hamilton and Jefferson. His "old solutions for new problems" as he calls them, include reducing taxes and debt, addressing border and immigration issues, and establishing morality and civility.

The book contains copies of the US Declaration of Independence, the US Constitution, and the Ten Commandments as appendices.
