= Breaker! Breaker! =

1977 film by Don Hulette

- Theatrical release poster
- Directed by: Don Hulette
- Written by: Terry Chambers
- Produced by: Sam Schulman; Bernard Tabakin; Don Hulette; John Burrows
- Starring: Chuck Norris; George Murdock; Terry O'Connor; Michael Augenstein
- Cinematography: Mario DiLeo
- Edited by: Steven Zaillian
- Music by: Don Hulette; Terry Chambers; Denny Brooks
- Production companies: Paragon Films Inc. Worldwide Productions
- Distributed by: AIP
- Release dates: May 6, 1977 (U.S.); May 15, 1978 (Germany); December 19, 1980 (Denmark)
- Running time: 85 min. (approx.)
- Country: United States
- Language: English
- Budget: $250,000
- Box office: $12 million or $3 million

Breaker! Breaker! is a 1977 American action film directed by Don Hulette and starring Chuck Norris in his first lead role. The co-stars include George Murdock, Don Gentry and Michael Augenstein. The film was a box-office success, grossing $12 million, but received generally negative reviews from critics.

== Plot ==
J.D. Dawes (Chuck Norris), a trucker from California, returns from the road to learn that an old friend was assaulted and paralyzed by Sergeant Strode (Don Gentry), a policeman in Texas City, California. He makes inquiries and learns that Strode and Deputy Boles (Ron Cedillos) have a history of "trapping" truckers for a corrupt judge named Joshua Trimmings. Flashbacks show that Trimmings founded Texas City to be a safe haven for his family's and friends' crimes.

When J.D.'s younger brother Billy (Michael Augenstein) begins working as a trucker, J.D. warns him to stay away from Texas City. But Billy is easily fooled by Strode on a CB radio, pretending to be a fellow trucker. The townsfolk capture him and steal his truck and cargo.

J.D. sets out in search for Billy and finds his way to Texas City. When the residents prove unhelpful, J.D. bursts into a town meeting to demand answers. Trimmings orders the police to arrest him, but J.D. uses his martial arts expertise to defeat them and escape. Eventually the townsfolk track him to the local wrecking yard, where the owner attempts to murder J.D. in a car crusher. J.D. escapes but accidentally kills the yard owner in the process. He is recaptured soon after and Trimmings sentences him to death.

J.D.'s fellow truckers come to rescue J.D. and Billy, knocking Strode into a ditch before smashing the town apart with their big rigs. J.D. finds Billy in a barn being tortured by Deputy Boles. J.D. fights Boles in a nearby horse corral, knocking him out. One of the truckers drives his rig into Judge Trimmings' house while he is in bed with his wife, as the rest of the corrupt town burns.

== Cast ==
- Chuck Norris as John David "J.D." Dawes
- George Murdock as Judge Joshua Trimmings
- Terry O'Connor as Arlene Trimmings
- Don Gentry as Sergeant Strode
- John DiFusco as Arney
- Ron Cedillos as Deputy Boles
- Michael Augenstein as Billy Dawes
- Dan Vandegrift as Wilfred
- Douglas Stevenson as Drake
- Paul Kawecki as Wade
- Larry Feder as George
- Jack Nance as Burton

== Production ==
Norris said he was paid $5,000 to do the film. "I didn't know anything when I made that movie", said Norris. "We shot it in just 11 days. But it was amazing, people loved it anyway. It's a down-home kind of movie. It's still my dad's favorite."

"I want to become as big in the movie industry as I've been in the karate industry", said Norris in 1977. "I know I can do it because I have the faith to do it."

== Reception ==
=== Critical response ===
Norris was not particularly proud of the film but in 1981 said it was his father's favorite of his movies and "made a lot of money".

The New York Times called it "shoddy" with "wooden direction" and a "sophomoric cast". The Los Angeles Times called it "a talky, melodramatic exploitation hybrid."

== In popular culture ==
The film was referenced on the May 24, 2007 episode of Late Night with Conan O'Brien, when O'Brien used a Breaker! Breaker! lever to showcase random scenes from Walker, Texas Ranger.

The film was the subject of a March 21, 2013. video-on-demand release by Rifftrax.

== See also ==
- Breaker! Breaker! at IMDb
- Chuck Norris filmography
