= Yellow Faced Tiger =

1974 Hong Kong film by Lo Wei

- Theatrical release poster
- Traditional Chinese: 黄面老虎
- Hanyu Pinyin: Huang mian lao hu
- Directed by: Lo Wei
- Written by: Lo Wei; Chang Yung-hsiang
- Produced by: Lo Wei; Raymond Chow; Leonard Ho
- Starring: Wong Tao; Sylvia Chang; Chuck Norris; Dan Ivan
- Cinematography: David Bailes
- Edited by: Fred Cuming
- Music by: Joseph Koo
- Production company: Lo Wei Motion Picture Company
- Distributed by: Golden Harvest
- Release date: 16 August 1974
- Running time: 100 minutes
- Country: Hong Kong
- Language: Mandarin

Yellow Faced Tiger (Chinese: 黄面老虎, originally released in the United States as Slaughter in San Francisco) is a 1974 Hong Kong-American martial arts action film directed by Lo Wei, and starring Wong Tao, Sylvia Chang and Chuck Norris.

== Summary ==
In this kung-fu vehicle Chuck Norris plays the biggest drug king in San Francisco who owns everyone, the police department included. He finds his match when a young police officer stands up to the drug lord's power and must fight him and the entire system. A former cop in the San Francisco Bay Area goes after the goons who murdered his ex-partner.

== Plot ==
Daly City, CA police officers John (Robert Jones) and Wong (Wong Tao) arrest two men raping a girl named Sylvia (Sylvia Chang), utilizing their knowledge of martial arts to take down the assailants, but at the station Sylvia refuses to press charges claiming that she knew the men and that the altercation was all in fun, in clear contradiction of what had truly taken place. In retribution for their arrest, the rapists kidnap John in broad daylight and take him to the beach, where he is beaten by numerous assailants. Wong manages to come to his partner's rescue, killing one of them. For this, he is kicked out of the force by his superior Captain Newman (Dan Ivan) and soon imprisoned, but John still keeps in touch with his old friend. After serving his sentence, Wong takes a job as a waiter. While waiting tables he meets Chuck Slaughter (Chuck Norris), a criminal mastermind. Slaughter offers Wong a job in his organization but Wong refuses, even as Slaughter threatens to have him killed.

John witnesses some men running away from a bank robbery one morning. While John is chasing some bank robbers, he pursues the robbers, but there are too many for him and one of them pulls a gun. John runs but is caught in the backyard of the Chu family, where the robbers kill him. The next morning when the police find his body the captain, Newman, accuses Mr. and Mrs. Chu of being in on the murder and the bank robbery. Newman has the Chu's arrested and locked up without bail despite Mr. Chu's claims that he had nothing to do with the crime and did not even see the men killing John in his backyard. Wong becomes involved because he wants to avenge John's death and free the Chu's. He begins shaking down Chinese criminals looking for clues, and they lead him to Captain Newman. Newman, who was working for Mr. Slaughter, intended to frame the Chu's for the crime committed by Slaughter's own men.

Wong fights Newman and kills him. After Wong kills Newman, he attempts to warn Chu's defending lawyer, but the boss of the gang has already murdered the lawyer (Joy Sales). Wong is confronted by Slaughter's men on the street, and fights them all off, eventually confronting Slaughter himself. Wong defeats Slaughter after a heated battle, and almost kills him when the police burst onto the scene. The new police captain stops Wong from delivering the lethal blow, informing him that he knows the whole story. Wong is reinstated to the police force, but refuses to carry a pistol, saying he "has no need of guns".

== Cast ==
- Don Wong Tao as Officer Don Wong (Yellow Faced Tiger)
- Sylvia Chang as Sylvia Clu
- Chuck Norris as Chuck Slaughter / Himself
- Dan Ivan as Captain Newman

== Release ==
=== Theatrical ===
The film played theatrically in the US in 1981 as Slaughter in San Francisco.

=== Home media ===
Videocassette releases in the 1980s and 90s used the Slaughter in San Francisco title as well as Karate Cop.

== Reception ==
=== Critical response ===
American critics noticed that it was a low budget martial arts film, and an early Norris acting credit, taking advantage of his current fame.

== See also ==
- Chuck Norris filmography
