= Forced Vengeance =

1982 American action film by James Fargo

- Theatrical release poster
- Directed by: James Fargo
- Written by: Franklin Thompson; James Fargo
- Produced by: John B. Bennett
- Starring: Chuck Norris; Mary Louise Weller
- Cinematography: Rexford L. Metz
- Edited by: Irving Rosenblum
- Music by: William Goldstein
- Production company: Metro-Goldwyn-Mayer
- Distributed by: MGM/UA Entertainment Co.
- Release date: July 30, 1982
- Running time: 90 minutes
- Country: United States
- Languages: English; French
- Budget: $5 million
- Box office: $6,660,333

Forced Vengeance is a 1982 American action film starring Chuck Norris, Mary Louise Weller, and Camila Griggs. The film was directed by James Fargo, written by Franklin Thompson and James Fargo, and filmed in the Crown Colony of Hong Kong and Portuguese Macau.

== Plot ==
When the owner and proprietor of the Lucky Dragon Casino in Hong Kong refuses to let mobsters take over his business, his family and he are hit. Dragon's chief of security, Josh Randall, goes looking for the head of the syndicate to exact revenge for the murder of his employer, friend, and mentor.

== Cast ==
- Chuck Norris as Chief Joshua Harrin "Josh" Randall
- Mary Louise Weller as Claire Bonner
- Camila Griggs as Joy Paschal
- Michael Cavanaugh as Stan Ramandi
- Peter Gee as Simon Koo
- David Opatoshu as Sam Paschal
- Seiji Sakaguchi as Kam
- Frank Michael Liu as David Paschal
- Bob Minor as LeRoy Nicely
- Lloyd Kino as Inspector Chen
- Leigh Hamilton as Sally Tennant
- Howard Caine as Milt Diamond
- Robert Emhardt as Carl Gerlich
- Roger Behrstock as Ron DiBiasi
- Jimmy Shaw as Inspector Keck
- Richard Norton as Herb

== Production ==
The film was originally known as The Jade Jungle. It had Norris' biggest budget yet, costing $5 million, and was from a major studio, MGM. The title was changed during production to Forced Vengeance.

== Reception ==
=== Critical response ===
Variety wrote: "In the unlikely event that a film historian stumbles across Forced Vengeance 20 years from now, he would probably guess that it was made somewhere around 1974—75. In setting, plotting, themes, and action motifs, latest Chuck Norris pic is incredibly reminiscent of those unlamented Yank-vs.-Hong Kong syndicate martial arties of that era. For Norris, who has given signs of trying to graduate from the genre, this is a step backwards, or at least is treading water". Kevin Thomas of the Los Angeles Times wrote that, by the middle of the film, "bone-crunching, flesh-ripping violence so dominates the screen that the film simply starts drowning in a sea of blood. By the end, it's hard to care, let alone differentiate, between the good guys and the bad. Such wretched excess is especially lamentable because Forced Vengeance starts off with a lot going for it: a serviceable, if familiar story (by Franklin Thompson), some likable people to root for, unfailingly photogenic and atmospheric Hong Kong locales (well photographed by Rexford Metz) and crisp direction by James Fargo, a Clint Eastwood alumnus". Richard Harrington of The Washington Post called the film "one of Norris' less sterling efforts, a scratchy mono to the stereo of such earlier efforts as Return of the Dragon and Force of One. Part of the problem is a script that seems better suited to '60s television ... Another part of the problem is Norris' monotonous acting". Jimmy Summers of BoxOffice wrote: "Maybe pairing Chuck Norris with MGM was just more than the karate star could handle. Instead of being one of his classiest movies, Forced Vengeance is one of his worst ... The presence of MGM veterans Tom and Jerry is the sole indication that this is an MGM movie. Otherwise it has the out-of-focused, grainy look of a chop-socky epic from China". Gene Siskel of the Chicago Tribune wrote: "The Orient is merely a canvas for what is little more than an American hoodlum story".

== See also ==
- List of American films of 1982
- Chuck Norris filmography
