= Born to Ride (2011 film) =

- Directed by: James Fargo
- Written by: Mike Anthony Jones; Robert Vozza
- Produced by: Michael C. Edwards; Martin Guigui; Dahlia Waingort Guigui
- Starring: Casper Van Dien; Patrick Muldoon; William Forsythe; Theresa Russell
- Production company: Sunset Pictures
- Release date: July 26, 2011
- Running time: 90 minutes
- Country: United States
- Language: English

Born to Ride is a 2011 motorcycle action film directed by James Fargo and starring Casper Van Dien and Patrick Muldoon.

== Plot ==
Two friends set off on a motorcycle journey and soon find themselves deep in a dangerous scandal.

== Release ==
According to Born to Ride co-star Patrick Muldoon the film was not released until 2011, several years after they finished filming. Born to Ride was also the first film to star Muldoon and Casper Van Dien since they made Starship Troopers together.

== Trivia ==
Born to Ride was the final film directed by James Fargo.
