= Riding the Edge =

- Directed by: James Fargo
- Written by: Ronald A. Suppa
- Produced by: Wolf Schmidt; Ronald A. Suppa
- Starring: Raphael Sbarge; Catherine Mary Stewart
- Cinematography: Bernard Salzmann
- Music by: Michael Gibbs
- Production company: Kodiak Films
- Distributed by: Trans World Entertainment
- Release date: April 1989
- Running time: 100 minutes
- Country: United States
- Language: English

Riding the Edge is a 1989 film directed by James Fargo and starring Raphael Sbarge and Catherine Mary Stewart.

== Synopsis ==
When his scientist father is kidnapped by Middle-Eastern terrorists, Matt Harman (Raphael Sbarge), a championship motocross contestant, is designated by his dad's captors as the ideal courier. Western governments agree that the boy can serve as a go-between, and he is all prepared to deliver a special computer chip to the terrorists. He is accompanied in his travels by lovely female secret agent Maggie Cole (Catherine Mary Stewart) and a local Middle Eastern boy who has the rare distinction of also being royalty. Together, they work to save Matt's father and defeat the terrorists.

== Cast ==
- Raphael Sbarge as Matt Harman
- Catherine Mary Stewart as Maggie Cole
- James Fargo as Tarek
