= Chuck Norris =

American martial artist and actor (1940–2026)

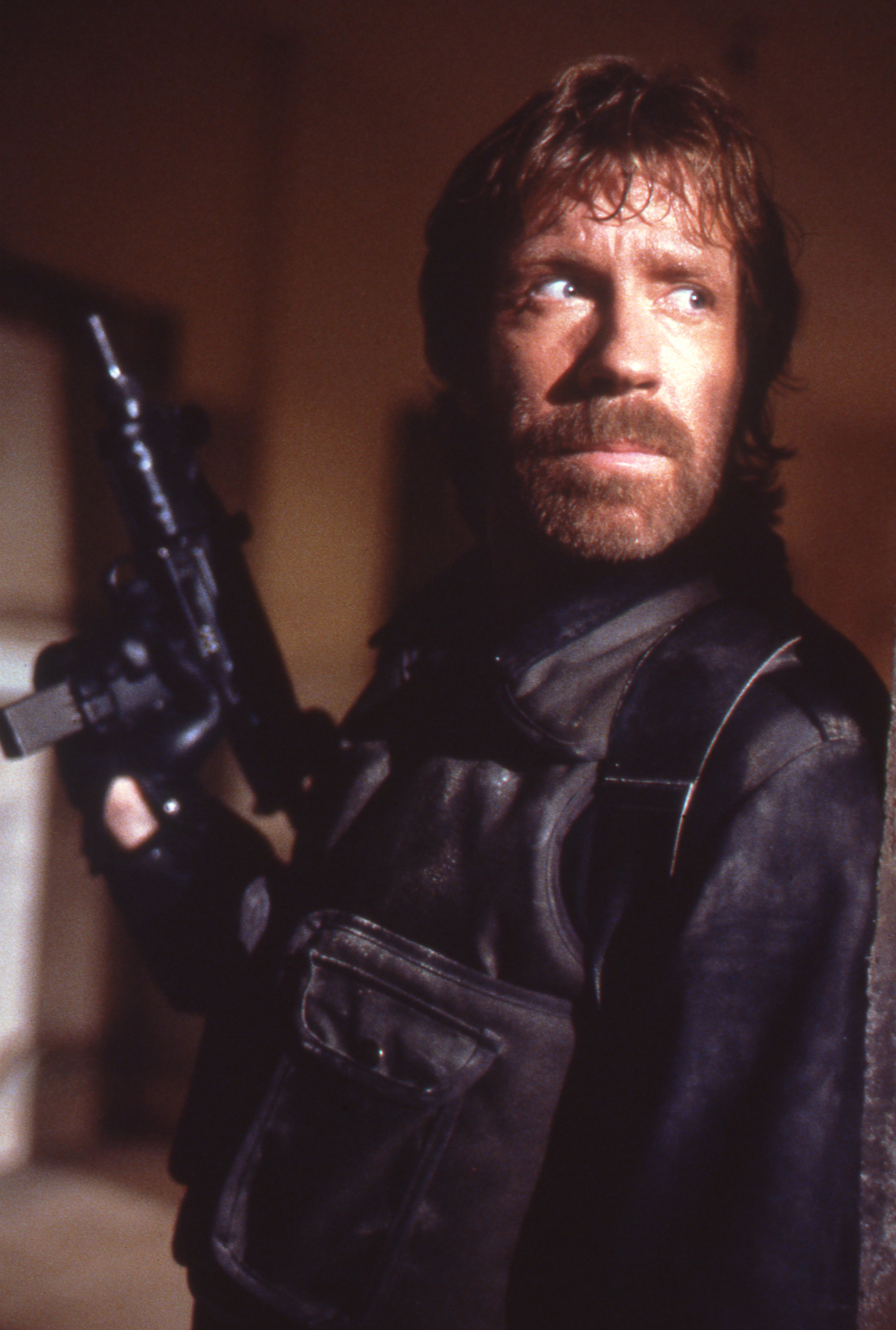
- Norris on the set of The Delta Force, 1986
- Born: Carlos Ray Norris; March 10, 1940; Ryan, Oklahoma, US
- Died: March 19, 2026 (aged 86); Kauaʻi, Hawaii, US
- Occupations: Martial artist; actor; screenwriter; author
- Years active: 1968–2026
- Works: Filmography
- Political party: Republican
- Spouses: Dianne Holechek (m. 1958; div. 1989); Gena O'Kelley (m. 1998)
- Children: 5, including Mike and Eric
- Relatives: Aaron Norris (brother)
- Website: Official website (archived)
- Military service
- Allegiance: United States
- Branch: United States Air Force
- Service years: 1958–1962
- Rank: Airman first class
- Station: Osan Air Base; March Air Reserve Base

Carlos Ray "Chuck" Norris (March 10, 1940 – March 19, 2026) was an American martial artist, actor, screenwriter, and author. He held black belts in karate, taekwondo, Tang Soo Do, Brazilian jiu-jitsu, and judo. After serving in the United States Air Force, he won numerous martial arts championships and later founded his own discipline, Chun Kuk Do. Norris began working in the American film industry as a martial arts instructor for celebrities before making his screen debut with a minor role in The Wrecking Crew (1968). Friend and fellow martial artist Bruce Lee invited him to play one of the main villains in The Way of the Dragon (1972). While Norris continued acting, friend and student Steve McQueen suggested he take it seriously. Norris took the starring role in the action film Breaker! Breaker! (1977), which turned a profit. His second lead, Good Guys Wear Black (1978), became a hit, and he soon became a popular action film star.

Norris went on to headline a series of commercially successful independent action and martial arts films, including A Force of One (1979), The Octagon (1980), and An Eye for an Eye (1981), which elevated him to international fame. He later starred in studio productions such as Silent Rage, Forced Vengeance (both 1982), and Lone Wolf McQuade (1983). His success led Cannon Films to sign him to a multi‑picture deal beginning with Missing in Action (1984), which launched a trilogy and cemented his status as the company's leading star throughout the 1980s. His work during this period included Invasion U.S.A. (1985), The Delta Force, and Firewalker (both 1986). Outside of Cannon, he also starred in Code of Silence (1985), which was regarded as one of his strongest films. In the 1990s, Norris played the title role in the long‑running CBS series Walker, Texas Ranger (1993–2001). He continued to appear in action films until 2006, and his final major film role was in The Expendables 2 (2012).

Beyond acting, Norris became a bestselling author of books on martial arts, exercise, philosophy, conservative politics, Christian western fiction, self‑help, and biography, and wrote a regular column for WorldNetDaily. He appeared in numerous commercials, including as a longtime spokesperson for the Total Gym. In 2005, Norris became the subject of the "Chuck Norris facts", an internet meme that humorously exaggerated his toughness and abilities. He endorsed various products that incorporated it, and the phenomenon inspired multiple books, two video games, and several talk‑show appearances.

== Early life ==
Carlos Ray Norris was born on March 10, 1940, in Ryan, Oklahoma, to Wilma Lee (née Scarberry; 1921–2024) and Ray Dee Norris (1918–1971), a World War II Army veteran who later worked as a mechanic, bus driver, and truck driver. His mother was of Irish ancestry. His father had German and British descent. Norris was named after Carlos Berry, his father's minister. He was the oldest of three brothers, the younger two being Wieland (1943–1970) and Aaron. When Norris was 16, his parents divorced. He later moved with his mother and brothers to Prairie Village, Kansas, and then to Torrance, California.

Predicting his own death, Wieland told Chuck that he would not reach his 27th birthday. The prediction proved true when he was killed in the Vietnam War in 1970. Norris described his childhood as downbeat: he was non-athletic, shy, and scholastically mediocre. His father worked intermittently as an automobile mechanic and went on drinking binges that lasted for months at a time. Embarrassed by his father's behavior and the family's financial difficulties, Norris developed a debilitating introversion that persisted throughout his childhood.

== Career ==
=== United States Air Force and martial arts breakthrough (1958–1971) ===
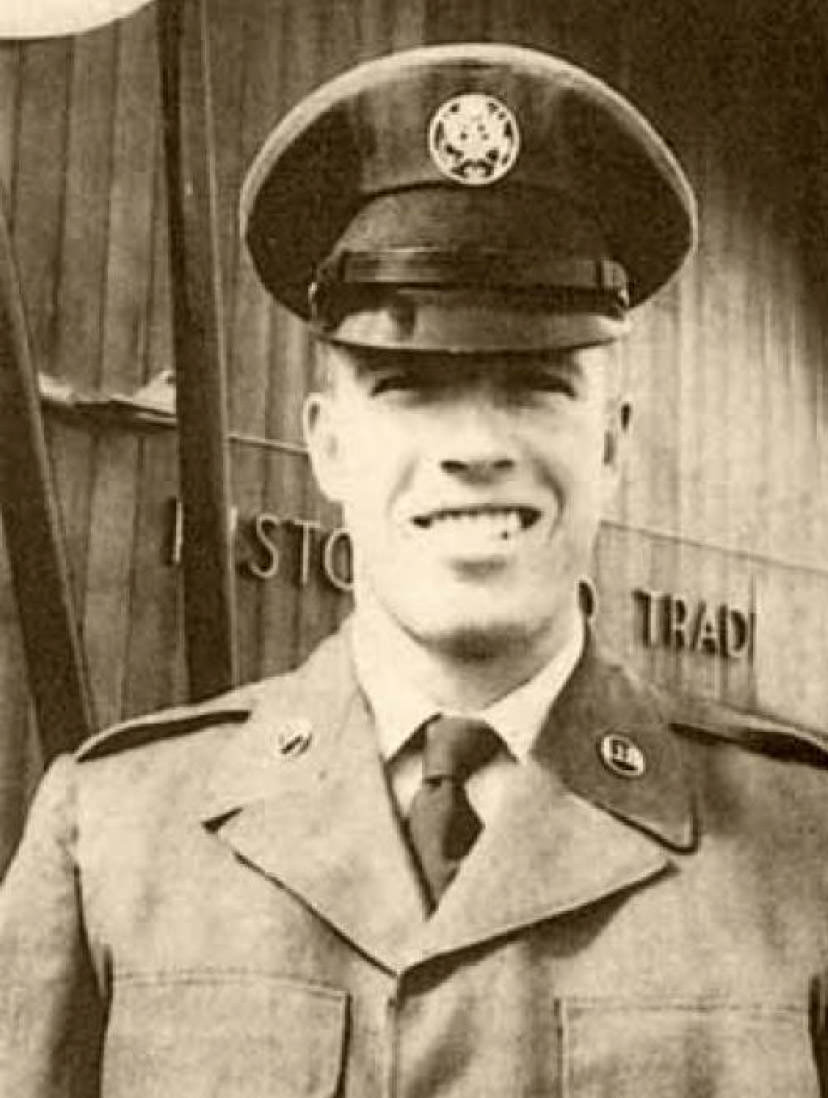
Norris during his Air Force career

In 1958, Norris joined the United States Air Force as an Air Policeman (AP) and was stationed at Osan Air Base in South Korea. There he acquired the nickname "Chuck" and began training in Tang Soo Do (tangsudo). After returning to the United States, he continued serving as an AP at March Air Force Base in California. In August 1962, he was discharged from the Air Force with the rank of airman first class. While applying to become a policeman in Torrance, California, he opened a martial arts studio and began competing in tournaments.

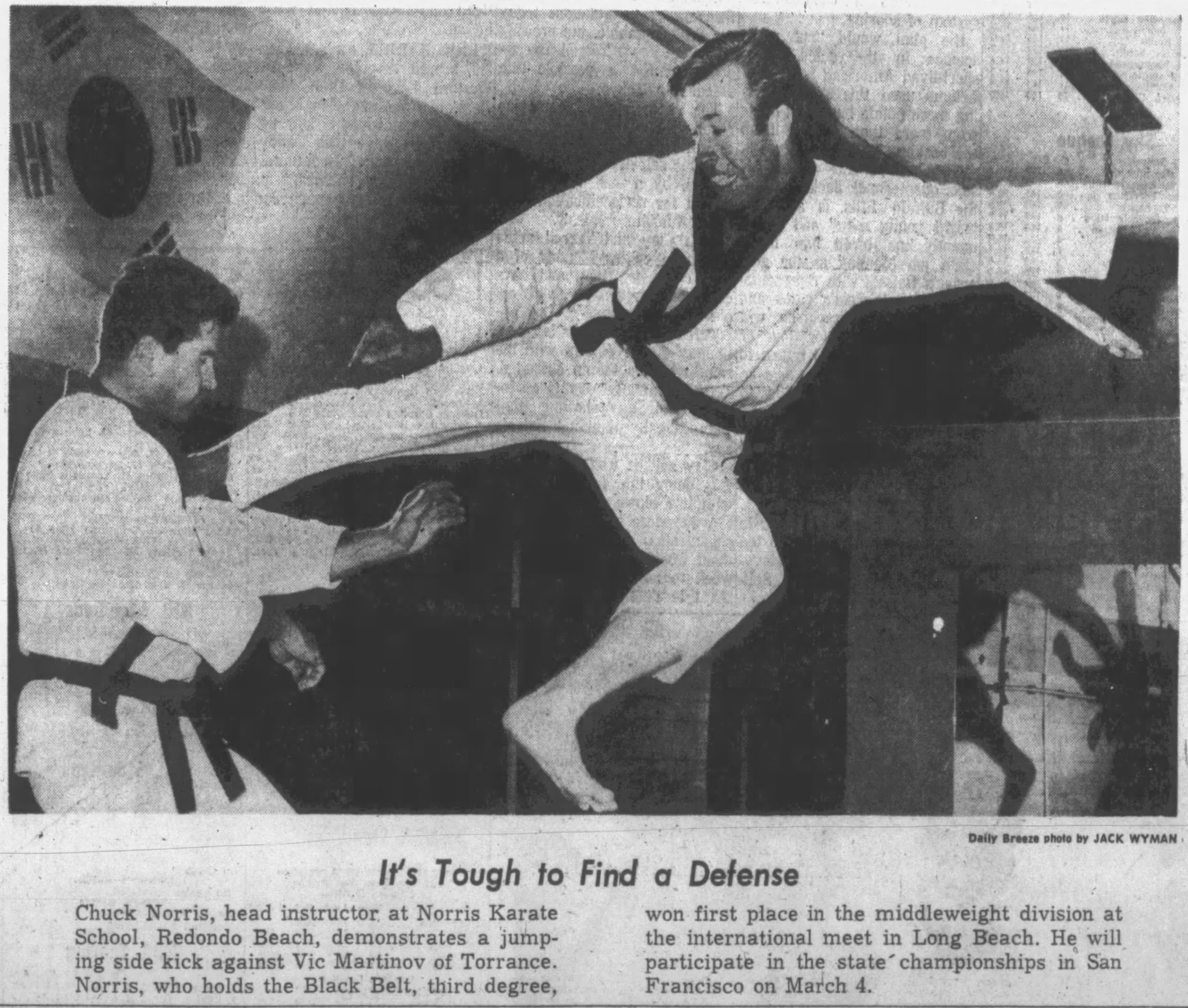
Newspaper clipping, February 21, 1967

Norris lost his first two competitive bouts, dropping decisions to Joe Lewis and Allen Steen, and later lost three rounds to Tony Tulleners at the International Karate Championships. He continued to improve, eventually defeating fighters such as Vic Moore and winning the 1967 karate tournament after defeating seven opponents, culminating in a final victory over Skipper Mullins. On June 24, 1967, he won S. Henry Cho's All-American Karate Championship at Madison Square Garden, taking the title from Julio LaSalle and defeating Joe Lewis. During this period, Norris worked for the Northrop Corporation and opened a chain of karate schools; his official website lists Steve and Chad McQueen, Bob Barker, Priscilla Presley, and Donny and Marie Osmond among his celebrity students.

In early 1968, Norris suffered an upset loss, losing a decision to Louis Delgado. On November 24, he avenged the loss and won the Professional Middleweight Karate Championship. On April 1, 1968, he successfully defended his All‑American Karate Championship title in a round‑robin tournament at the Karate Tournament of Champions of North America. He won the All‑American Championship again later that year and retired from the competition undefeated. While competing, Norris met Bruce Lee—then known for The Green Hornet—and the two developed a friendship as well as a training and working relationship.

In August 1969, Norris defended his world championship title at the International Karate Championship, which featured competitors from most US states and several countries. He retained the title, won Karate's triple crown for the most tournament victories of the year, and was named Fighter of the Year by Black Belt magazine. Around this time, he made his acting debut in the Matt Helm spy spoof The Wrecking Crew. Norris retired from competition in 1970, making a short comeback in 1972 going 1-1. His final complete record is unknown, but using records from back issues of Black Belt Magazine, his confirmed bouts show his record as 31 wins with 14 defeats.

=== Early roles and breakthrough (1972–1978) ===
In 1972, Norris acted as Bruce Lee's nemesis in the widely acclaimed martial arts movie Way of the Dragon (titled Return of the Dragon in its U.S. distribution). The film grossed over HK$5.3 million at the Hong Kong box office, beating previous records set by Lee's own films, The Big Boss and Fist of Fury, making it the highest-grossing film of 1972 in Hong Kong. The Way of the Dragon went on to gross an estimated US$130 million worldwide. The film is credited with launching him toward stardom. In 1973, Norris played a role in Jonathan Kaplan's The Student Teachers.

In 1974, actor Steve McQueen, who was Norris's martial art student and friend at the time, saw his potential and encouraged him to begin acting classes at MGM. That same year, he played the supporting role of the main antagonist in Lo Wei's Yellow Faced Tiger. Norris plays a powerful drug king in San Francisco, where he dominates the criminal world including the police department. He is eventually challenged by a young police officer who stands up to corruption. The film played theatrically in the United States in 1981 as Slaughter in San Francisco. The advertisements capitalized on Norris's fame, positioning him as the leading man despite his role as the antagonist, and presenting the film as a new release rather than an older, low-budget production. Linda Gross of The Los Angeles Times described it as a "tacky" Hong Kong film with poor fight choreography, acting, and dubbing.

In 1975, Norris wrote his first book, Winning Tournament Karate, on the practical study of competition training for any rank. It covers all phases of executing speedy attacks, conditioning, fighting form drills, and one-step sparring techniques. Norris's first starring role was 1977's Breaker! Breaker! He chose it after turning down offers to do several martial-arts films. Norris decided that he wanted to do films that had a story and where the action would take place when it is emotionally right. The low-budget film turned out to be very successful.

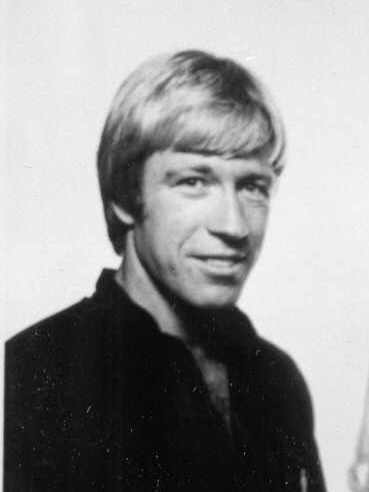
Norris in 1976

In 1978, Norris starred in Good Guys Wear Black. He considered it to be his first significant lead role. No studio wanted to release it, so Norris and his producers four-walled it, renting the theaters and taking whatever money came in. The film performed very well; shot on a $1 million budget, it made over $18 million at the box office. Following years of kung fu film imports from Hong Kong action cinema during the 1970s, most notably Bruce Lee films followed by Bruceploitation flicks, Good Guys Wear Black launched Norris as the first successful homegrown American martial-arts star. Good Guys Wear Black distinguished itself from earlier martial-arts films by its distinctly American setting, characters, themes, and politics, a formula that Norris continued to develop with his later films.

=== Action film star (1979–1983) ===
In 1979, Norris starred in A Force of One. The film was developed while touring for Good Guys Wear Black. Again, no studio wanted to pick it up, but it out-grossed the previous film by making $20 million at the box office. In 1980, he released The Octagon. Unlike his previous films, this time the studios were interested. American Cinema Releasing distributed it and it made almost $19 million at the box office.

In 1981, he starred in Steve Carver's An Eye for an Eye. In 1982, he had the lead in the action horror film Silent Rage. It was his first film released by a major studio, Columbia Pictures. Shortly afterward MGM gave him a three-movie deal and that same year, they released Forced Vengeance. Norris was unhappy with the direction the studio wanted to take and the contract was canceled.

In 1983, Norris made Lone Wolf McQuade with Orion Pictures and Carver directing. He plays a reckless but brave Texas Ranger who defeats an arms dealer played by David Carradine. The film was a worldwide hit and had a positive reception from movie critics, often being compared to Sergio Leone's stylish spaghetti Westerns. The film became the inspiration for Norris's future hit TV show Walker, Texas Ranger. Film critic Roger Ebert gave the film a 3.5 star rating, calling the character of J.J. McQuade worthy of a film series and predicting the character would be a future classic, and it would be the first movie where Norris would wear his trademark beard. The same year, he also published an exercise called Toughen Up! the Chuck Norris Fitness System. Also in 1983, Xonox produced the video game Chuck Norris Superkicks for the Commodore 64, VIC-20, Atari 2600, and Colecovision. It was later sold as Kung Fu Superkicks when the license for the use of the Chuck Norris name expired.

=== Mainstream success (1984–1989) ===
In 1984, Norris starred in Joseph Zito's Missing in Action, the first of a series of POW rescue fantasies where he played Colonel James Braddock. It was produced by Menahem Golan and Yoram Globus and released under their Cannon Films banner, with which he had signed a multiple movie deal. Norris later dedicated these films to his younger brother Wieland, who was a private in the 101st Airborne Division, and had been killed in June 1970 in Vietnam while on patrol in the defense of Firebase Ripcord. The film was a huge success, and Norris became Cannon's most prominent star of the 1980s.

In October 1984, principal photography of Andrew Davis's Code of Silence started. The film's complexity and dramatic depth marked a departure for Norris. The film is about a cop who is ostracized for refusing to support a corrupt cop who killed an innocent bystander, while protecting the daughter of a mob boss. Davis described Norris as "easy to work with and very supportive". Released by Orion Pictures on May 3, 1985, it received generally positive reviews, with critics praising its slick direction, strong performances, and engaging action. It was regarded as a standout in Norris' career, with many considering it his best film.

Vincent Canby of The New York Times said that "it could well prove to be his breakout picture". Of its critical success, Norris said, "I really appreciate the acclaim, I've worked hard these last nine years to get critics to look at me in a different light. They're usually more concerned with things like Passage to India, and they've hit me hard all these years, especially in the beginning. I'm really excited, to say the least." The film debuted at number 1 with an opening weekend gross of $5.5 million and ultimately earned a total of $20.3 million at the US box office. Missing in Action 2: The Beginning premiered on March 1, 1985. It is a prequel to the first installment, about Braddock being held in a North Vietnamese POW camp. Invasion U.S.A. premiered on September 27, with Zito directing.

On February 14, 1986, Menahem Golan's The Delta Force premiered. Norris co-starred with Lee Marvin, who play leaders of an elite squad of special forces troops who face a group of terrorists. The Delta Force was a box office success. In October, Ruby-Spears's cartoon Karate Kommandos first aired. The animated show lasted five episodes. In it, Norris voices a cartoon version of himself who leads a United States government team of operatives known as the Karate Kommandos. Marvel made a comic book adaptation.

On November 21, J. Lee Thompson's action-adventure comedy Firewalker premiered, where Norris co-led with Louis Gossett Jr.; they play two seasoned treasure hunters whose adventures rarely result in any notable success. Norris explained that the project came about when he wanted to show a lighter side of himself. Gossett appreciated Norris's efforts and said, "I have great respect for what actors call stretch. Chuck had to open up first to allow this atmosphere. It has to do with his desire to stretch. Someone else could have been quite insecure. He chose to open up. He's studying hard and he's serious." The reviews were mostly negative, while some thought it was a fine for a light action film. (Note: Attributed to multiple references:) Kevin Thomas of the Los Angeles Times said the cast "really get into the light-hearted spirit of the occasion". The film made $11,834,302 at the box-office.

In 1987, the New York Times Best Seller book The Secret of Inner Strength: My Story was published, which Norris co-wrote with Joe Hyams. It's a biography mixed with his self-improvement philosophy. When the publisher Little, Brown initially approached him, Norris turned them down saying "I am only in my mid-40s and I have got a lot to live yet." However the editor's son was a fan of Norris and insisted that she pursued Norris and explained to him "we are interested in where you came from, out of poverty in Oklahoma and on welfare, then being a non-athlete in school to becoming a karate champion, then being shy and jumping into acting. We are interested, along with the public, in how you were able to accomplish this. The philosophies and formulas you have used." This changed Norris's mind. Norris explained that "a lot of people face the same things I faced, they don't know what to do in life or where to go. They hit one obstacle and they immediately give up. So maybe my book can be a guide to help people." On the process Norris said "writing that book was a different animal. It was scary because you are opening yourself up for everyone to look inside." He also added that "the book was kind of therapeutic for me. Thirty-five years ago, a man who drank was a drunkard. Now I realize my dad had a disease." After writer Joe Hyams submitted his manuscript, Norris explained "it was not in my own voice. So I rewrote the book. It took me two years." Kirkus Reviews found the book simplistic, but earnest, and concluded that "Norris' sincerity and fascinating life odyssey add up to a likable and modest account from a likable and modest star."

On January 2, 1988, Braddock: Missing in Action III premiered; Norris returned to the title role and his brother Aaron Norris made his directorial debut. On the development of the film, Norris said "When Cannon asked me about doing a trilogy of 'MIA,' I replied, 'What else can I do?' I really wasn't interested in doing a third one. Then my brother, Aaron, said, 'Have you been reading about the Amerasian children?' He started telling me that in Vietnam there are 15,000 Amerasian children who are trapped there, considered outcasts, living a strictly non- existent life. So I started reading up on the subject and got emotionally involved. James Bruner and I began writing this story about an officer in the Vietnam War whose wife was presumed killed when their home was blown up during the fall of Saigon. The officer is wounded and shipped out. Twelve years later, he learns that his wife is still alive and he has a old son. The rest of the movie concerns his efforts to them out of the get country." Norris thought that it was the best film he ever made prior to its release. Norris said he was "frustrated", with the job Cannon Films did with marketing the film: "I was ready to break my contract because it was the best of the series. We had a big meeting, and I told them that if they didn't do a better job marketing my films in the U.S., I was going to take them to court because my career is on the line". In the United States, the movie made $2,210,401 in the opening weekend, and grossed $6,193,901. The film was met with mostly negative reviews, criticized for its formulaic action, some noted faint attempts at emotional storytelling, but overall, it was seen as predictable and heavy-handed.

On August 28, Norris starred as a cop investigating a serial killer, in Hero and the Terror directed by William Tannen. This was a departure from his usual roles. He said, "I liked seeing not just the man in the arena or the fighting machine you see in many of my films, but to see the man outside the arena -- the guy who also has relationships." He added, "what makes this a different film is the vulnerability of the character I play. There are moments of humor, romance and compassion, and there are moments of terror, anguish and anxiety." In the United States, the movie made $1,840,487 on the opening weekend, and grossed $5,301,200. The reviews for the film were mostly negative, they felt that script damaged a slick production where Norris did a good job acting and expanding his range. Michael Mills of the Fort Worth Star-Telegram said that he found Norris's performance "engaging" and added that it "proves him capable of stretching beyond his customary loner stance to function convincingly as a romantic lead."

=== Subsequent success (1990–1999) ===
By 1990, his films had collectively grossed over $500 million worldwide. By this time, he had drawn comparisons to both Bruce Lee and Clint Eastwood, sometimes called the "blonde Bruce Lee" for his martial arts film roles, while his "loner" persona was compared to the Eastwood character Dirty Harry. That same year, MGM acquired the Cannon Films library. Norris continued making films with Aaron, who directed him in Delta Force 2 (1990), The Hitman (1991), Sidekicks (1993), Hellbound (1994), Top Dog (1995), and Forest Warrior (1996).

In 1993, he began shooting the action series Walker, Texas Ranger. The television show is centered on Sergeant Cordell Walker (Norris), a member of the Texas Rangers, a state-level bureau of investigation, and is about his adventures fighting criminals with his partner James Trivette. It aired from 1993 to 2001 on CBS and continued in syndication on other channels, notably the Hallmark Channel. Throughout its run, the show was a consistent ratings success, ranking among the Top 30 programs from 1995 to 1999, including Top 20 finishes in the 1995–1996 and 1998–1999 seasons. In 1999, Norris produced and played Walker in a supporting role in the Walker, Texas Ranger spin-off Sons of Thunder. The same year, also playing the role of Walker, Norris acted in a crossover episode of the Sammo Hung television show Martial Law. For another crossover, Hung also appeared as his character in Walker, Texas Ranger.

Separately from Walker, Texas Ranger, on August 25, 1993, the Randy Travis television special Wind in the Wire first aired; Norris was among the guests. At the 1994 edition of the World Wrestling Federation (WWF)'s Survivor Series event, Norris was the special outside enforcer for the Casket Match between The Undertaker and Yokozuna. During the match, Norris delivered a roundhouse kick to an interfering Jeff Jarrett. In 1996, Norris wrote the book The Secret Power Within: Zen Solutions to Real Problems. Since 1997, Norris had appeared with Christie Brinkley in a long-running series of cable television infomercials promoting Total Gym home fitness equipment. On November 1, 1998, CBS premiered Michael Preece's television film Logan's War: Bound by Honor, starring Norris and Eddie Cibrian. It was ranked third among the thirteen most viewed shows of that week.

=== Subsequent films and internet fame (2000–2005) ===
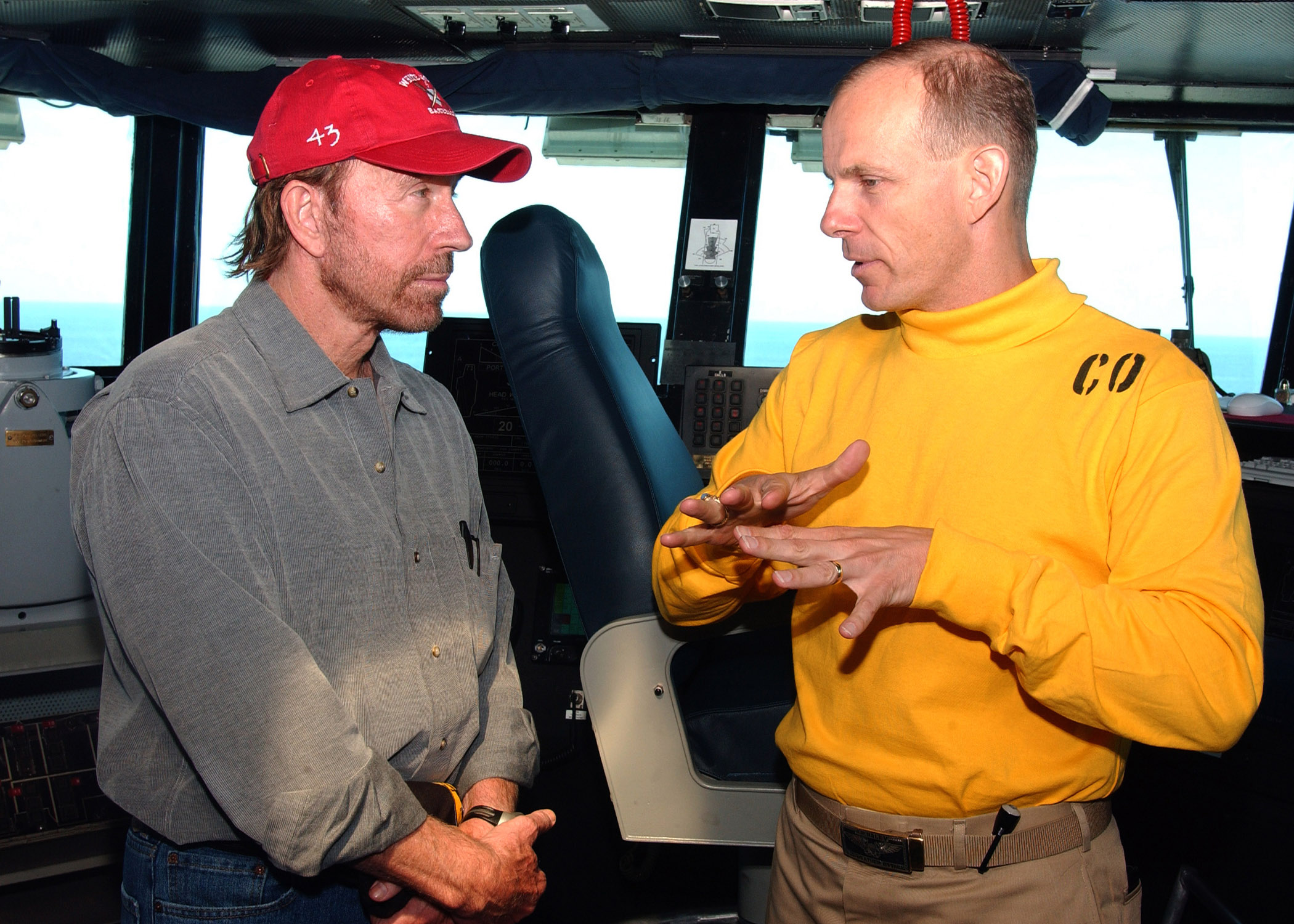
Norris during a meeting with USS Theodore Roosevelt (CVN-71) commanding officer Captain J. R. Haley, in June 2005

Norris starred as a secret agent in the CBS television films The President's Man and The President's Man: A Line in the Sand in 2000 and 2002, respectively. In 2003, Norris played a role in the supernatural Christian film Bells of Innocence. That same year, he acted in one episode of the television show Yes, Dear. In 2004, Rawson Marshall Thurber's comedy film DodgeBall: A True Underdog Story was released. Norris plays himself as a judge during a dodgeball game. Described by critics as "a raunchy comedy that delivers for many", it grossed $167.7 million. That same year, he published his autobiography Against All Odds: My Story.

In 2005, Norris founded the World Combat League (WCL), a full-contact, team-based martial arts competition, of which part of the proceeds are given to his Kickstart Kids program. On October 16, 2005, CBS premiered the Sunday Night Movie of the Week Walker, Texas Ranger: Trial by Fire. The production was a continuation of the series, and not scripted to be a reunion movie. Norris reprised his role as Walker.

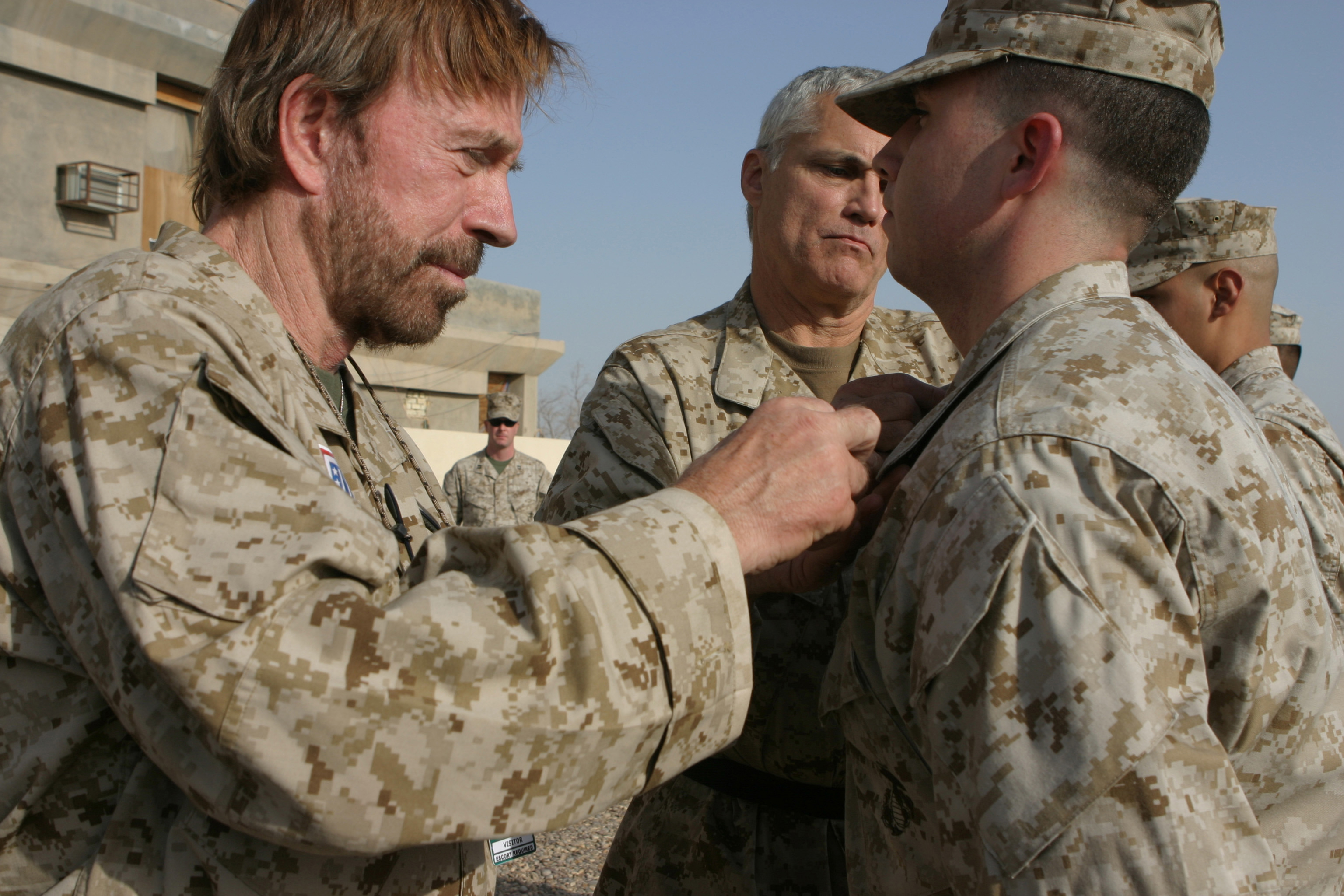
Norris during a promotion ceremony at Camp Taqaddum in Iraq in November 2006

Chuck Norris facts originally started appearing on the Internet in early 2005. Created by Ian Spector, they are satirical factoids about Norris. Since then, they have become widespread in popular culture. The "facts" are normally absurd hyperbolic claims about Norris's toughness, attitude, virility, sophistication, and masculinity. Norris wrote his own response to the parody on his website, stating that he did not feel offended by them and found some of them funny, claiming that his personal favorite was that they wanted to add his face to Mount Rushmore, but the granite is not hard enough for his beard. At first it was mostly college students exchanging them, but they later became extremely widespread. From that point on, Norris started to tour with the Chuck Norris facts, appearing on major talk shows and visiting troops in Iraq for morale boosting appearances.

=== Later works (2006–2026) ===
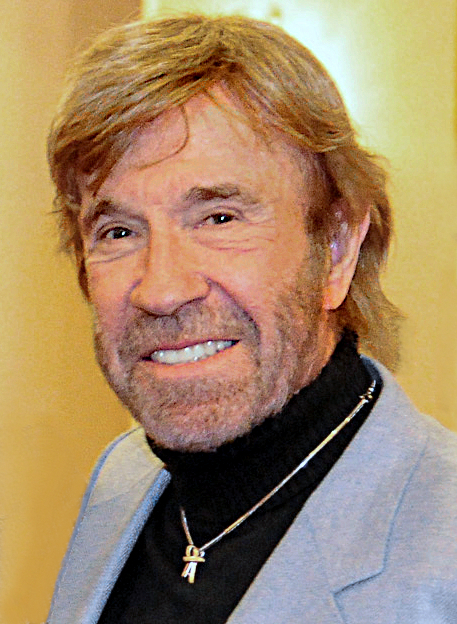
Norris in 2015

Norris published the novel The Justice Riders in 2006, co-written with Ken Abraham, Aaron Norris, and Tim Grayem. He later followed up with a sequel, A Threat to Justice. Gotham Books, an imprint of Penguin USA, published The Truth About Chuck Norris: 400 facts about the World's Greatest Human, written by Ian Spector. In December 2007, Norris filed a lawsuit against Penguin USA alleging "trademark infringement, unjust enrichment and privacy rights", but he withdrew the suit in 2008. The book became a New York Times bestseller, and Spector subsequently published four additional books based on Chuck Norris facts, one of which also reached the New York Times bestseller list. Tyndale House Publishers released The Official Chuck Norris Fact Book: 101 of Chuck's Favorite Facts and Stories, which Norris co‑wrote and officially endorsed.

In 2008, Norris published the political nonfiction book Black Belt Patriotism: How to Reawaken America, which reached number 14 on The New York Times bestseller list in September of that year. Also in 2008, Gameloft released the mobile video game Chuck Norris: Bring On the Pain, inspired by the popularity of the Chuck Norris facts. The game, a side-scrolling beat 'em up featuring Norris as the playable character, received positive reviews. Beginning in 2010, Norris wrote a nationally syndicated column for Creators Syndicate, addressing personal health topics as well as broader issues related to health care in the United States. Throughout the 2010s, Norris appeared in advertisements for T-Mobile, World of Warcraft, BZ WBK, the French television show "Pieds dans le plat", Hoegaarden, United Healthcare, Hesburger, Cerveza Poker, and Toyota. In the 2020s, he appeared in advertising for QuikTrip.

In 2012, Norris appeared as a mercenary in The Expendables 2, which grossed more than $310 million worldwide. That same year, Norris and his wife, Gena, founded CForce Bottling Co. after an aquifer was discovered on their Texas ranch. In 2017, Norris became an ambassador for Fiat, serving as the "tough face" of its commercial vehicle line. Flaregames released Non Stop Chuck Norris, an isometric action-RPG for mobile devices and the second game based on the Chuck Norris facts; it received positive reviews. In 2019, Norris hosted the History Channel documentary Chuck Norris' Epic Guide to Military Vehicles, in which he examined US military vehicle designs. In 2020, he appeared in the series finale of Hawaii Five-0. That same year, Norris was featured as a playable character in World of Tanks during its Christmas holiday event.

== Martial arts knowledge ==
Chuck Norris
- Style: Chuck Norris System (Note: Chun Kuk Do was renamed to the Chuck Norris System in 2015.) (founder); American Tang Soo Do (Note: Founder, former system); Tang Soo Do (Moo Duk Kwan); Taekwondo; Karate; Brazilian Jiu-Jitsu; Judo
- Teachers: Shin Jae-chul (Note: Tang Soo Do, Moo Duk Kwan); Machado Brothers
- Rank: 10th-degree black belt Chuck Norris System/Chun Kuk Do; 10th-degree black belt American Tang Soo Do; 8th-degree black belt Taekwondo; 8th-degree black belt Kyokushin Budokai; 5th-degree black belt in Karate; 3rd-degree black belt in Brazilian Jiu-Jitsu; Black belt in Judo

Norris founded two major martial arts systems: American Tang Soo Do and Chuck Norris System (formerly known as Chun Kuk Do).

=== American Tang Soo Do ===
American Tang Soo Do was formed in 1966 by Norris, and is a combination of Moo Duk Kwan-style Tang Soo Do, (Note: Older system taught by Shin Jae-chul. Not Soo Bahk Do that Moo Duk Kwan founder eventually developed the original style into.) Judo and Karate (Shito-Ryu and Shotokan).

=== Chuck Norris System ===
Norris's martial art system is the Chuck Norris System, formerly known as Chun Kuk Do. The style was formally founded in 1990 as Chun Kuk Do by Norris, and was originally based on Norris's Tang Soo Do training in Korea while he was in the military.

During his competitive fighting career, Norris began to evolve the style to make it more effective and well-rounded by studying other systems such as Shōtōkan, Gōjū-ryū, Shitō-ryū, Enshin kaikan, Kyokushin, Judo, Brazilian jiu-jitsu, Arnis, Taekwondo, Tang Soo Do, Hapkido and American Kenpo. Chun Kuk Do now emphasizes self defense, competition, weapons, grappling, and fitness, among other things. Each summer the United Fighting Arts Federation (UFAF) holds a training conference and the Chun Kuk Do world championship tournament in Las Vegas, Nevada.

The art includes a code of honor and rules to live by. These rules are from Norris's personal code. They are:

1. I will develop myself to the maximum of my potential in all ways.
2. I will forget the mistakes of the past and press on to greater achievements.
3. I will continually work at developing love, happiness and loyalty in my family.
4. I will look for the good in all people and make them feel worthwhile.
5. If I have nothing good to say about a person, I will say nothing.
6. I will always be as enthusiastic about the success of others as I am about my own.
7. I will maintain an attitude of open-mindedness.
8. I will maintain respect for those in authority and demonstrate this respect at all times.
9. I will always remain loyal to my God, my country, family and my friends.
10. I will remain highly goal-oriented throughout my life because that positive attitude helps my family, my country and myself.

Like most traditional martial arts, Chuck Norris System includes the practice of forms (Korean hyung and Japanese kata). The majority of the system's forms are adapted from Korean Tang Soo Do, and Taekwondo, Japanese Shitō-ryū, Shotokan Karate, Goju-ryu, Kyokushinkai Karate, Judo, Brazilian Jiu-jitsu, and American Kenpo. It includes two organization-specific introductory forms, two organization-specific empty-hand forms, and one organization-specific weapon form (UFAF Nunchuk form, UFAF Bo form, UFAF Sai forms). The United Fighting Arts Federation has graduated over 3,000 black belts in its history, and currently has nearly 4,000 active members world-wide.

== Distinctions, awards, and honors ==
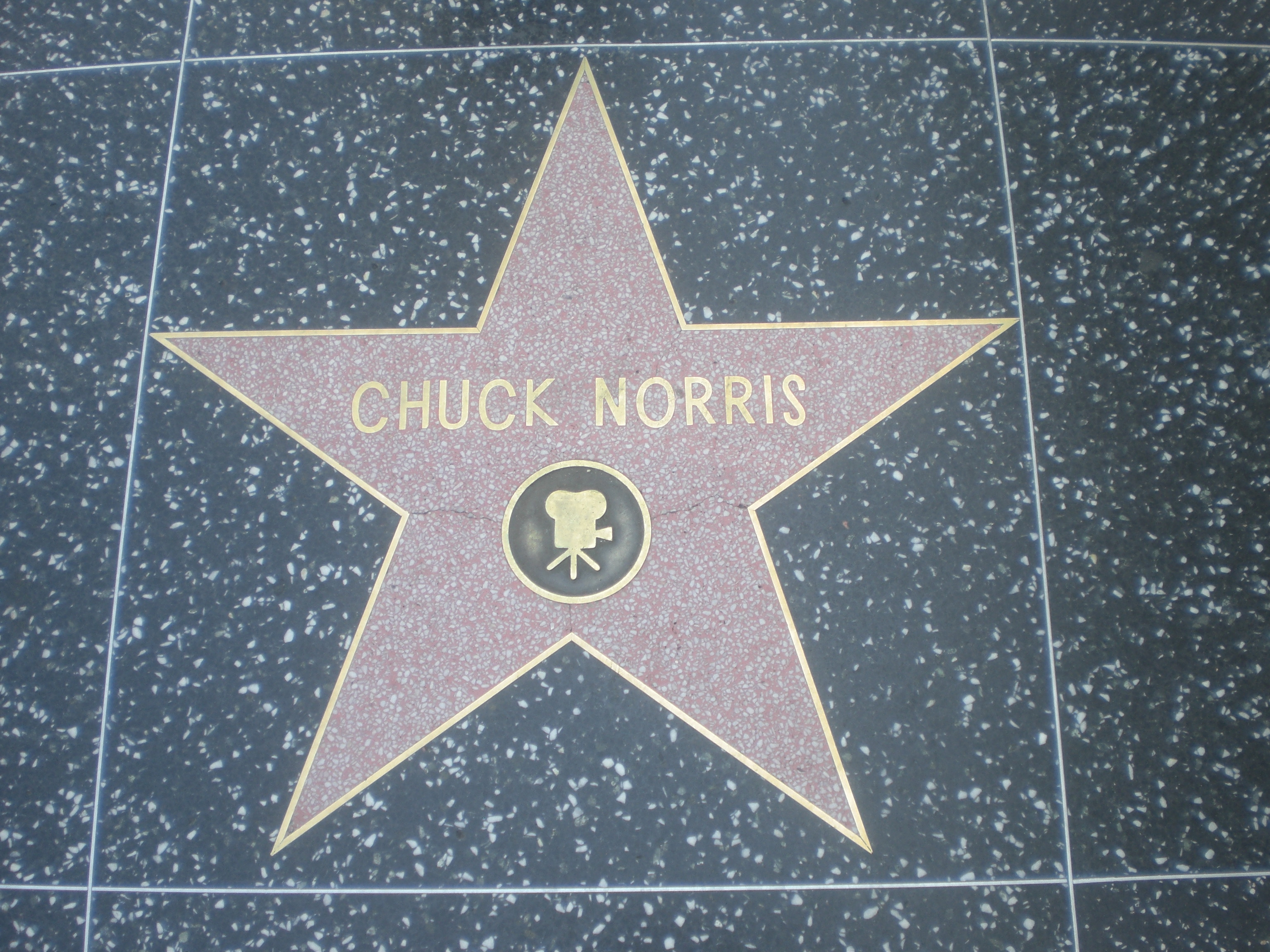
Norris's Hollywood star

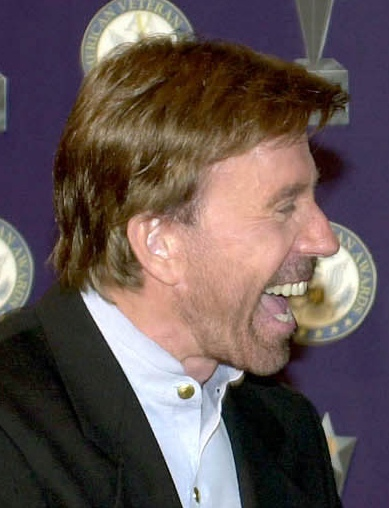
Norris receiving the Veteran of the Year award by the U.S. Air Force in 2001

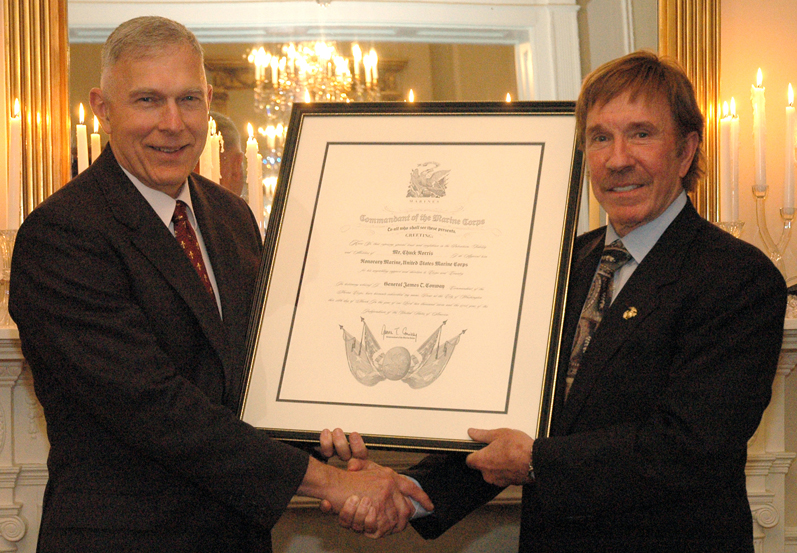
Commandant Gen. James T. Conway making Norris an honorary United States Marine in 2007

- Norris received several black belts. These include a 10th-degree black belt in Chun Kuk Do (founded 1990 by Chuck Norris. Based on his Tang Soo Do training in Korea while he was in military), a 9th-degree black belt in Tang Soo Do, an 8th-degree black belt in Taekwondo, a 5th-degree black belt in Karate, a 3rd-degree black belt in Brazilian jiu-jitsu from the Machado family, and a black belt in Judo.
- In 1967, he won the Sparring Grand Champions at the S. Henry Cho's All American Championship, and won it again the following year.
- In 1968, he won the Professional Middleweight Karate champion title, which he held for six consecutive years.
- In 1969, he won Karate's triple crown for the most tournament wins of the year.
- In 1969, he won the Fighter of the Year award by Black Belt magazine.
- In 1982, he won Action Star of the Year at the ShoWest Convention.
- In 1989, he received his Star on the Hollywood Walk of Fame.
- In 1992, he won International Box Office Star of the Year at the ShoWest Convention.
- In 1997, he won the Special Award of being a Texas legend at the Lone Star Film & Television Awards.
- In 1999, Norris was inducted into the Martial Arts History Museum's Hall of Fame as one of its 10 inaugural members.
- In 1999, he won the Inspirational Acting in Television Award at the Grace Prize Award.
- In 2001, he received the Veteran of the Year at the American Veteran Awards.
- In 2001, he won the Golden Boot at the Golden Boot Awards.
- On March 28, 2007, Commandant Gen. James T. Conway made Norris an honorary United States Marine during a dinner at the commandant's residence in Washington, D.C.
- On December 2, 2010, he (along with brother Aaron) was given the title honorary Texas Ranger by Rick Perry, the Texas Governor.
- In 2010, he won the Lifetime Achievement Award at the ActionFest.
- In 2017, he was honored as an "Honorary Texan" because for many years he had lived at his Texas ranch near Navasota and he starred as Texas Ranger in his movie Lone Wolf McQuade and starred as ranger Cordell Walker in the TV series Walker, Texas Ranger.

== Personal life ==
=== Family ===
Norris married Dianne Kay Holechek (1941–2025) in December 1958 in Torrance, California. He was 18 and she was 17, and the two had been classmates at North High School in Torrance. After 30 years of marriage, they separated in 1988 and finalized their divorce in 1989. They had two sons, Mike (born 1962) and Eric (born 1965).

Norris married Gena O'Kelley, a model 23 years his junior, on November 28, 1998. They met in 1997 while Norris was on a date with another woman. The couple had fraternal twins born in 2001. Norris also had a daughter, Dina, from an extramarital relationship. While stationed in California during his service in the United States Air Force, he began seeing a woman named Johanna without disclosing that he was married to Holechek. Norris and Dina met for the first time in 1990, and he publicly acknowledged her in 2004 in his memoir Against All Odds: My Story. Norris had 13 grandchildren as of 2017.

=== Christianity ===
Norris was a Christian and the author of several Christian-themed books. He described his faith journey as a conscious turning point that reshaped his personal priorities, including his views on family, responsibility, and moral discipline.

He was a Baptist and a member of the Prestonwood Baptist Church, part of the Southern Baptist Convention, in Dallas.

=== Political views ===
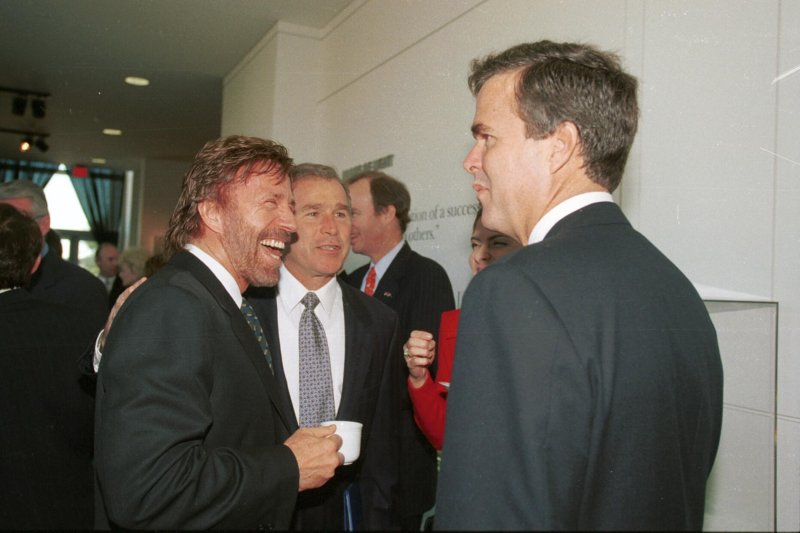
Norris with George W. Bush and Jeb Bush in November 1997

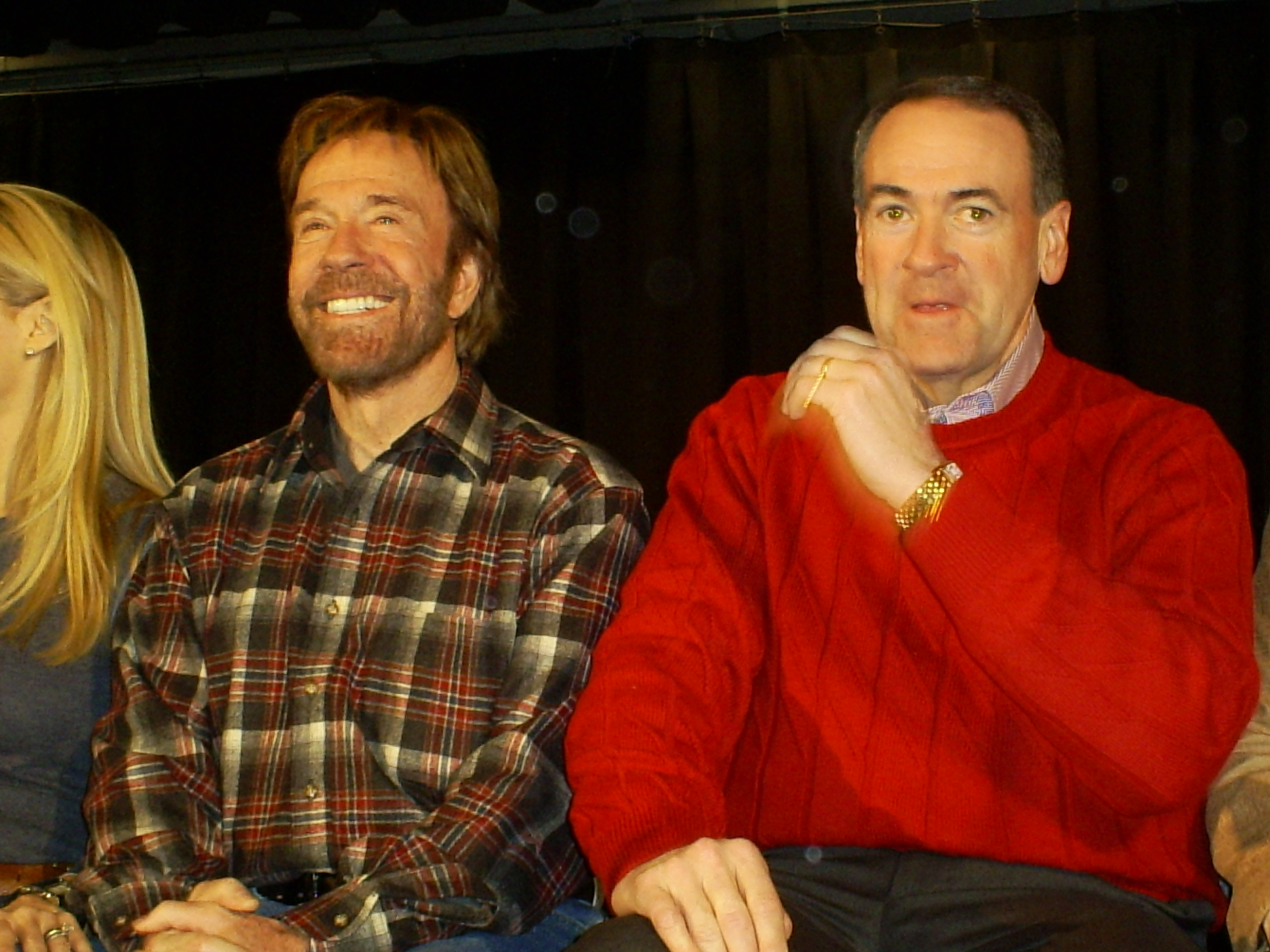
Norris with Mike Huckabee in Londonderry, New Hampshire, in January 2008

Norris was a Republican and a staunch conservative. He wrote a regular column for the far-right website WorldNetDaily. Following the release of Missing in Action in 1984, he described himself as "a conservative, a real flag waver, a big Ronald Reagan fan", adding that he supported leaders who spoke their minds and projected strength.

During the filming of The Delta Force in 1985, Norris commented on the hijacking of TWA Flight 847, arguing that the United States was becoming a "paper tiger" in the Middle East and warning that terrorism abroad would eventually reach North America. He cited statements by Libyan leader Muammar Gaddafi as evidence of the threat.

In 2007, Norris traveled to Iraq to visit U.S. troops. He supported Mike Huckabee's campaign in the 2008 Republican presidential primaries and drew attention for suggesting that eventual nominee John McCain was too old to handle the demands of the presidency. He later supported McCain in the 2008 presidential election, emphasizing his enthusiasm for McCain's partner on the Republican ticket, Sarah Palin.

On November 18, 2008, Norris became one of the first members of show business to express support for the California Proposition 8 ban on same-sex marriage, and he criticized activists for not accepting the democratic process and the apparent double standard he perceived in criticizing the Church of Jesus Christ of Latter-day Saints without criticizing African Americans, most of whom had voted for the measure.

In 2009, Norris had expressed support for the Barack Obama citizenship conspiracy theories. In his letter, released at WorldNetDaily, Norris deemed President Obama's refusal to disclose his birth certificate suspicious and implored him to put an end to the conspiracy theories. On April 11, 2011, Norris had written a five-part investigation regarding the "infiltration of Sharia law into United States culture" for WorldNetDaily. On June 26, 2012, Norris published an article on Ammoland.com, in which he accused the Obama administration of paying Jim Turley, one of the national board members of the Boy Scouts of America at the time, to reverse the organization's policy that excluded gay youths from joining.

During the 2012 United States presidential election, Norris first recommended Ron Paul, and then later formally endorsed Newt Gingrich as the Republican presidential candidate. After Gingrich suspended his campaign in May 2012, Norris endorsed Mitt Romney, the Republican presumptive nominee, despite Norris having previously accused Romney of flip-flopping and of trying to buy the nomination for the Republican Party candidacy for 2012. On the eve of the election, he and his wife Gena made a video warning that if evangelicals did not show up at the polls and vote out President Obama, "our country as we know it may be lost forever".

Norris visited Israel multiple times, and he voiced support for Israeli prime minister Benjamin Netanyahu in the 2013 and 2015 Israeli legislative elections. Norris endorsed Huckabee again in the 2016 Republican primaries before he dropped out. In March 2016, it was reported that Norris endorsed Republican Ted Cruz, the Senator in Texas, and that he would be attending a Cruz rally, but two days later, Norris stated he would only endorse the GOP nominee once that nominee has been nominated by the party. Later, Norris endorsed former Alabama Chief Justice Roy Moore in the 2017 United States Senate special election in Alabama.

In 2019, Norris signed an endorsement deal with light weapons manufacturer Glock. The deal was met with criticism from members of the public and some of his fans, who felt it was in bad timing due to the increase in school shootings in the United States. In 2021, Norris announced his support of the 2021 gubernatorial election to recall incumbent Governor Gavin Newsom and endorsed conservative political commentator and talk radio host Larry Elder to replace him.

After speculation arose about his possible attendance at the January 6 Capitol attack following the photo of a lookalike there which went viral on social media, Norris denied being present, commenting "there is no room for violence of any kind in our society", and that he "always will be for Law and Order".

=== Death ===
In March 2026, Norris was hospitalized in Hawaii after experiencing a medical emergency. He died on March 19, at the age of 86. His family announced his death the following day, and opted to keep his cause of death private.

== Philanthropy ==
In 1990, Norris established the United Fighting Arts Federation and Kickstart Kids. As a significant part of his philanthropic contributions, the organization was formed to develop self-esteem and focus in at-risk children as a tactic to keep them away from drug-related pressure by training them in martial arts. Norris hoped that by shifting middle school and high school children's focus towards this positive and strengthening endeavor, these children will have the opportunity to build a better future for themselves. Norris had a ranch in Navasota, Texas, and a bottled water production facility on that ranch, a portion of the sales support environmental initiatives and Kickstart Kids.

Norris was known for his contributions towards organizations such as Funds for Kids, Veteran's Administration National Salute to Hospitalized Veterans, the United Way, and the Make-A-Wish Foundation in the form of donations as well as fund-raising activities. His time with the United States Veterans Administration as a spokesperson was inspired by his experience serving the United States Air Force in Korea. His objective had been to popularize the issues that concern hospitalized war veterans such as pensions and health care. Due to his significant contributions, and continued support, he received the Veteran of the Year award in 2001 at the American Veteran Awards. In India, Norris supported the Vijay Amritraj Foundation, which aims to help victims of disease, tragedy and circumstance. Through his donations, he helped the foundation support Paediatric HIV/AIDS homes in Delhi, a blind school in Karnataka, and a mission that cares for HIV/AIDS-infected adults, as well as mentally ill patients in Cochin.

== Filmography ==
=== Film ===
Year	Title	Role	Notes	Ref.
1968	The Wrecking Crew	Man in the House of 7 Joys	Uncredited extra	
1972	The Way of the Dragon	Colt		
1973	The Student Teachers	Karate Advisor	Cameo	
1974	Yellow Faced Tiger	Chuck Slaughter / Himself	Also released as "Slaughter in San Francisco"	
1977	Breaker! Breaker!	John David "J.D." Dawes	Also fight choreographer	
1978	Good Guys Wear Black	Major John T. Booker	Also martial arts choreographer	
1979	A Force of One	Matt Logan	Also fight choreographer	
1980	The Octagon	Scott James	Also fight choreographer	
1981	An Eye for an Eye	Detective Sean Kane		
1982	Silent Rage	Sheriff Daniel "Dan" Stevens		
1982	Forced Vengeance	Chief Joshua Harrin "Josh" Randall		
1983	Lone Wolf McQuade	Ranger Jim "J.J." McQuade		
1984	Missing in Action	Colonel James Thomas Braddock		
1985	Missing in Action 2: The Beginning	Colonel James Thomas Braddock		
1985	Code of Silence	Sergeant Eddie Cusack		
1985	Invasion U.S.A.	Agent Matt Hunter	Also writer	
1986	The Delta Force	Major Scott McCoy		
1986	Firewalker	Max Donigan		
1988	Braddock: Missing in Action III	Colonel James Thomas Braddock	Also writer	
1988	Hero and the Terror	Detective Danny O'Brien		
1990	Delta Force 2: The Colombian Connection	Colonel Scott McCoy		
1991	The Hitman	Detective Cliff Garret / Danny Grogan		
1992	Sidekicks	Himself	Limited release; also executive producer	
1993	Chuck Norris: Private Lesson	Himself	Direct-to-video; also writer and executive producer	
1994	Hellbound	Sergeant Frank Shatter		
1995	Top Dog	Lieutenant Jake Wilder		
1996	Forest Warrior	Jebediah McKenna	Direct-to-video	
2003	Bells of Innocence	Matthew	Limited release	
2004	Dodgeball: A True Underdog Story	Himself	Cameo	
2004	Birdie & Bogey	None	Limited release; еxecutive producer only	
2005	The Cutter	Detective John Shepherd	Direct-to-video; also executive producer	
2012	The Expendables 2	Booker "The Lone Wolf"		
2024	Agent Recon	Captain Alastair	Streaming release	
2027	Zombie Plane	Himself	Completed; cameo, posthumous release	

=== Television ===
Year	Title	Role	Notes	Ref.
1970	Room 222	Himself	Episode: "Dreams of Glory"; cameo	
1986	Karate Kommandos	Himself	5 episodes; voice role	
1993	Wind in the Wire	Himself	Television film; cameo	
1993–2001	Walker, Texas Ranger	Sergeant Ranger Cordell Walker	196 episodes; also executive producer for 80 episodes and story for 6 episodes	
1993–2001	Walker, Texas Ranger	Hayes Cooper	5 episodes	
1998	Logan's War: Bound by Honor	Ranger Jake Fallon	Television film; also story and executive producer	
1999	Sons of Thunder	Sergeant Ranger Cordell Walker	4 episodes; also executive producer for 6 episodes and creator for 1 episode	
2000	Martial Law	Sergeant Ranger Cordell Walker	Episode: "Honor Among Strangers"	
2000	The President's Man	Agent Joshua McCord	Television film; also executive producer	
2002	The President's Man: A Line in the Sand	Agent Joshua McCord	Television film; also executive producer	
2003	Yes, Dear	Himself	Episode: "Jimmy and Chuck"	
2004	Late Night with Conan O’Brien	Himself	Guest performer, episode dated 08/09/2004	
2005	Walker, Texas Ranger: Trial by Fire	Captain Ranger Cordell Walker	Television film; also executive producer	
2007	Inside World Combat League	None	Television film; executive producer only	
2015	The Goldbergs	Himself	Episode: "Boy Barry"; voice role	
2019	Chuck Norris's Epic Guide to Military Vehicles	Himself	Television special; also executive producer	
2020	Hawaii Five-0	Sergeant Major Lee Phillips	Episode: "A ʻohe ia e loaʻa aku, he ulua kapapa no ka moana"; cameo	

=== Commercials ===
Year	Title	Role	Notes	Ref.
1993	Right Guard	Himself		
1997	Dodge Ram	Himself		
2010	CForce	Himself		
2011	World of Warcraft	Himself	Hunter	
2012	WBK Bank Commercial	Himself		
2017	UnitedHealthcare- Lunch vs Chuck	Himself		
2018	Toyota Tacoma	Himself		
2021	World of Tanks Holiday Ops	Himself		

=== Soundtrack appearances ===
Year	Title	Song	Notes	Ref.
1996	Walker, Texas Ranger	"Eyes Of The Ranger"	Episode: "A Ranger Christmas"; uncredited	

=== Video games ===
Year	Title	Role	Notes	Ref.
1984	Chuck Norris Superkicks	Himself	Licensed likeness and cover model.	
2008	Chuck Norris: Bring On the Pain	Himself	Licensed likeness.	
2020	World of Tanks: Holiday Ops	Himself		
2023	Crime Boss: Rockay City	Himself		

== Bibliography ==
- Winning Tournament Karate (1975)
- Toughen Up! The Chuck Norris Fitness System (1983)
- The Secret of Inner Strength: My Story (1987)
- The Secret Power Within: Zen Solutions to Real Problems (1996)
- Against All Odds: My Story (2004)
- The Justice Riders (2006)
- A Threat to Justice (2007) ISBN 978-0-80544-033-1
- Black Belt Patriotism: How to Reawaken America (2008). Regnery Publishing. ISBN 978-1-59698-558-2.
- The Official Chuck Norris Fact Book: 101 of Chuck's Favorite Facts and Stories (2009) ISBN 978-1-41433-449-3
