= Eric Norris =

American race car driver and stuntman (born 1965)

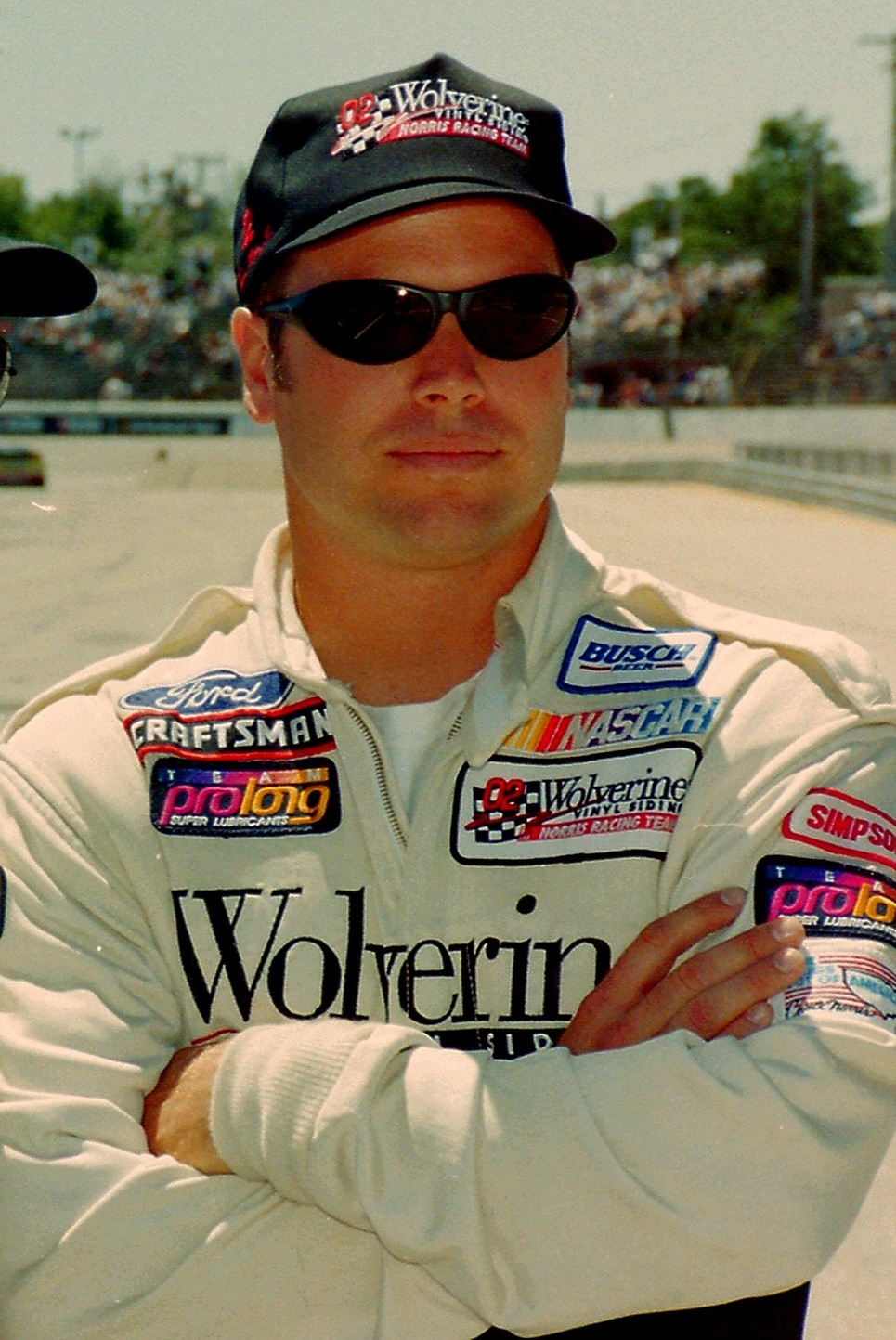
- Norris at the Milwaukee Mile in 1997
- Born: Eric Scott Norris; May 20, 1965 (age 61); Redondo Beach, California, U.S.
- Occupations: Stock car racing driver; stuntman; television director
- Spouse: Stephanie Norris
- Children: 4
- Father: Chuck Norris
- Relatives: Mike Norris (brother); Aaron Norris (uncle)
- Achievements: 2002 NASCAR Winston West Series Champion
- Awards: West Coast Stock Car Hall of Fame (2019)

NASCAR O'Reilly Auto Parts Series career
- 2 races run over 1 year
- Best finish: 112th (2005)
- First race: 2005 Stater Brothers 300 (California)
- Last race: 2005 Sam's Town 300 (Las Vegas)
Wins	Top tens	Poles
0	0	0

NASCAR FedEx Freight Truck Series career
- 19 races run over 8 years
- Best finish: 42nd (1997)
- First race: 1997 Pennzoil Discount Center 200 (New Hampshire)
- Last race: 2007 Sam's Town 400 (Texas)
Wins	Top tens	Poles
0	0	0

ARCA Menards Series career
- 3 races run over 2 years
- Best finish: 137th (2000)
- First race: 1998 Z-Max 250 (Texas)
- Last race: 2000 EasyCare Vehicle Service Contracts 100 (Charlotte)
Wins	Top tens	Poles
0	0	0

ARCA Menards Series West career
- 66 races run over 9 years
- Best finish: 1st (2002)
- First race: 1996 Winter Heat 200 (Tucson)
- Last race: 2012 Pick-N-Pull Racing To Stop Hunger 200 (Sonoma)
- First win: 2000 Spears Manufacturing 250 (Mesa Marin)
- Last win: 2002 (Coors Light 200 presented by NAPA and Albertson's Evergreen)
Wins	Top tens	Poles
3	32	2

Eric Scott Norris (born May 20, 1965) is an American former stock car racing driver and stuntman. He won the 2002 NASCAR Winston West Series Championship.

Norris is also a director and directed several episodes of the TV-series Walker, Texas Ranger, which starred his father, Chuck Norris.

== Early life ==
Norris was born on May 20, 1965, in Redondo Beach, California, the son of martial artist and Walker, Texas Ranger star Chuck Norris and Dianne (née Holecheck). Norris began racing in 1982 with his father in the SCORE Off-Road Series but retired to study at Arizona State University.

== Career ==
=== 1983–1997: Formula Ford Series to Craftsman Truck Series, and early film work ===
Following his graduation, Norris began racing at Willow Springs Raceway and the Formula Ford Series.

On September 27, 1985, Invasion U.S.A. premiered with his father as the lead. In it, Norris is credited for stunts.

In 1986, Norris played roles in The Delta Force and Invaders from Mars. That year, Norris was a stunt player on Avenging Force.

In 1988, Norris was a stunt player for the motion pictures starring his father Hero and the Terror.

In 1990, Norris returned as a stunt player for his father in Delta Force 2: The Colombian Connection.

In 1990, Norris was credited for stunts in Beastmaster 2: Through the Portal of Time and Necessary Roughness. That year, Norris got a stunt performer credit in Star Trek VI: The Undiscovered Country.

In 1992, Norris appeared in Universal Soldier.

On December 3, 1993, Norris played the role of a thug in the film Rescue Me. That year, Norris is credited for utility stunt on Benefit of the Doubt and Best of the Best II. Also that year, Norris was as a stunt player for the films Sidekicks, where he also played a biker, and Three of Hearts.

Norris' father went on to star in the long lasting hit TV show Walker, Texas Ranger,(1993–2001) where, he acted in nineteen episodes, directed nine, and produced four.

In 1994, Norris provided stunts for the film Hellbound.

Norris made his Craftsman Truck Series debut in 1997, running five races in the No. 02 Wolverine Vinyl Siding Ford F-150 for Ultra Motorsports. His best finish that season came at Watkins Glen International, where he finished 13th.

=== 1998–present: continued racing and stunt work in films ===
From 1998 to 2000, Norris worked with his father on Logan's War: Bound by Honor (1998), The President's Man (2000), and The President's Man: A Line in the Sand.

Norris ran again in 1999, when he ran both races at Texas Motor Speedway. He finished 35th in the first race, which he ran with Ultra's No. 02 Ford, and 22nd in the second race, driving the No. 4 Coca-Cola Dodge Ram for Bobby Hamilton Racing. That season, he began running in the West Series full-time, finishing tenth in points.

In 2000, Norris worked on the television film Also that year, he made one start in the No. 5 Ultra truck at Texas, but finished 35th after being caught up in a lap 2 crash. He also won his first NASCAR race at Mesa Marin Raceway in the West Series and finished seventh in the series points.

Norris ran the No. 32 Jani-King Chevrolet Silverado for Matt Stowe in three 2001 races. His best finish of the season was a seventeenth at Texas. In the fall, a 23rd at California Speedway was the first time that Norris ran at a track other than Texas since 1997. He finished fifth in the standings in the West Series, but did not win another race. He won the championship by 119 points in 2002, winning twice and finishing in the top-ten for every race during the season.

Norris did not return to the Craftsman Truck Series until 2004, when once again, Jim Smith and Ultra Motorsports gave Norris a two-race deal. Norris was 36th in his first start at Texas, but in his next start at Homestead-Miami, Norris finished 14th.

In 2005, Norris ran four races, all for Green Light Racing. In his first start of the year at Texas, Norris had his best career weekend to date, churning in his best career start and best career finish of twelfth. There, he also led his first career lap. He only finished one of the other three starts, which was a twentieth at Kansas Speedway.

Norris made his Busch Series debut in 2005, running a pair of races for MacDonald Motorsports. He qualified 35th and finished 41st in his debut at California in February, after the No. 72 P4OT.com Chevy broke an engine. Norris then returned at Las Vegas, finishing 35th, ten laps off the pace.

Norris returned to Green Light early in 2006, running their No. 07 truck at California. However, an early crash put him to 35th in the results. Norris competed in some more races for Green Light in 2006 with some good runs.

Ever since, Norris consistently works in the stunt department in both films and television. Some these credits includes Mike Judge's Office Space (1999), Jon Turteltaub's National Treasure (2004), Ben Affleck's The Town (2010) among many others.

In 2015, Norris was nominated at the 67th Emmy Awards for Outstanding Stunt Coordination for a Drama Series, Limited Series or Movie for his participation as a stunt coordinator on the hit show Sons of Anarchy created by Kurt Sutter.

== Personal life ==
Norris and his brother Mike are the two sons of the union of actor Chuck Norris and first wife Dianne Holecheck. Through his father, Norris is the nephew of Aaron Norris, the stepson of Gena Norris, and has a half brother and two half sisters.

Norris has lived with his wife, Stephanie, since circa 1993 and they have four children together. The family lives in California.

== Filmography ==
- The Delta Force (1986) – Andy, U.S. Navy Diver
- Invaders from Mars (1986) – MP #2
- Universal Soldier (1992) – GR86
- Rescue Me (1992) – Thug
- Sidekicks (1992) – Biker #5
- Top Dog (1995) – Border Patrol Officer
- The Guardian (2006) – Navy Guy

== Motorsports career results ==
=== NASCAR ===
(key) (Bold– Pole position awarded by qualifying time. Italics– Pole position earned by points standings or practice time. *– Most laps led.)

==== Nationwide Series ====
NASCAR Nationwide Series results
Year	Team	No.	Make	1	2	3	4	5	6	7	8	9	10	11	12	13	14	15	16	17	18	19	20	21	22	23	24	25	26	27	28	29	30	31	32	33	34	35	NNSC	Pts	Ref
2005	MacDonald Motorsports	72	Chevy	DAY	CAL; 41	MXC	LVS; 35	ATL	NSH	BRI	TEX	PHO	TAL	DAR	RCH	CLT	DOV	NSH	KEN	MLW	DAY	CHI	NHA	PPR	GTY	IRP	GLN	MCH	BRI	CAL	RCH	DOV	KAN	CLT	MEM	TEX	PHO	HOM	112th	98	
2008	Richardson-Haas Motorsports	14	Ford	DAY	CAL; Wth	LVS	ATL	BRI	NSH	TEX	PHO	MXC	TAL	RCH	DAR	CLT	DOV	NSH	KEN	MLW	NHA	DAY	CHI	GTY	IRP	CGV	GLN	MCH	BRI	CAL	RCH	DOV	KAN	CLT	MEM	TEX	PHO	HOM	95th	191	

==== Craftsman Truck Series ====
NASCAR Craftsman Truck Series results
Year	Team	No.	Make	1	2	3	4	5	6	7	8	9	10	11	12	13	14	15	16	17	18	19	20	21	22	23	24	25	26	NCTC	Pts	Ref
1997	Ultra Motorsports	02	Ford	WDW	TUS	HOM	PHO	POR	EVG	I70	NHA; 37	TEX	BRI	NZH	MLW; 22	LVL	CNS	HPT	IRP	FLM; DNQ	NSV; DNQ	GLN; 13	RCH; DNQ	MAR	SON	MMR	CAL; 31	PHO	LVS	42nd	553	
1997	Ultra Motorsports	12	Ford																		NSV; 22									42nd	553	
1999	Ultra Motorsports	12	Ford	HOM	PHO	EVG	MMR	MAR	MEM	PPR	I70	BRI	TEX; 34	PIR	GLN	MLW	NSV	NZH	MCH	NHA	IRP	GTY	HPT	RCH	LVS	LVL				75th	158	
1999	Bobby Hamilton Racing	4	Dodge																								TEX; 22	CAL		75th	158	
2000	Ultra Motorsports	5	Ford	DAY	HOM	PHO	MMR	MAR	PIR	GTY	MEM	PPR	EVG	TEX	KEN	GLN	MLW	NHA	NZH	MCH	IRP	NSV	CIC	RCH	DOV	TEX; 35	CAL			110th	58	
2001	Matt Stowe	32	Chevy	DAY	HOM	MMR	MAR	GTY	DAR	PPR	DOV	TEX; 17	MEM	MLW	KAN	KEN	NHA	IRP	NSH	CIC	NZH	RCH	SBO	TEX; 32	LVS	PHO	CAL; 23			62nd	273	
2004	Ultra Motorsports	7	Dodge	DAY	ATL	MAR	MFD	CLT	DOV	TEX	MEM	MLW	KAN	KEN	GTW	MCH	IRP	NSH	BRI	RCH	NHA	LVS	CAL	TEX; 36	MAR	PHO	DAR	HOM; 14		67th	176	
2005	Ron Rhodes Racing	48	Dodge	DAY	CAL	ATL	MAR	GTY; DNQ	MFD	CLT	DOV																			50th	360	
2005	Green Light Racing	07	Chevy									TEX; 12	MCH	MLW	KAN	KEN; 32	MEM	IRP	NSH	BRI	RCH	NHA	LVS; 20	MAR	ATL; 35	TEX	PHO	HOM		50th	360	
2006	Green Light Racing	07	Chevy	DAY	CAL; 35	ATL	MAR	GTY	CLT	MFD	DOV	TEX	MCH	MLW	KAN	KEN	MEM	IRP	NSH	BRI	NHA	LVS	TAL	MAR	ATL	TEX	PHO	HOM		86th	58	
2007	Green Light Racing	08	Chevy	DAY	CAL	ATL	MAR	KAN	CLT	MFD	DOV	TEX; 20	MCH	MLW	MEM	KEN	IRP	NSH	BRI	GTW	NHA	LVS	TAL	MAR	ATL	TEX	PHO	HOM		89th	103	

==== K&N Pro Series West ====
NASCAR K&N Pro Series West results
Year	Team	No.	Make	1	2	3	4	5	6	7	8	9	10	11	12	13	14	15	NKNPSWC	Pts	Ref
1996		98	Ford	TUS; 14	AMP	MMR	SON	MAD	POR	TUS	EVG	CNS	MAD	MMR	SON	MMR	PHO	LVS	59th	118	
1998	SMS Motorsports	67	Ford	TUS; 23	LVS; DNQ														14th	1441	
1998	Matt Stowe	32	Ford			PHO; 14	CAL; 20	HPT; 12	MMR; 22	AMP; 13	POR	CAL; 12	PPR; 18	EVG; 9	SON; 5	MMR; 8	LVS; 36		14th	1441	
1999	Matt Stowe	32	Ford	TUS; 19	LVS; 12	PHO; 18	CAL; 12	PPR; 4	MMR; 8	IRW; 10	EVG; 18	POR; 12	IRW; 19	RMR; 12	LVS; 6	MMR; 17	MOT; 3		11th	1821	
2000	Matt Stowe	32	Ford	PHO; 19	MMR; 23	LVS; 3	CAL; 4	LAG; 6	IRW; 12	POR; 6	EVG; 15	IRW; 18	RMR; 11	MMR; 1	IRW; 12				7th	1621	
2001	Matt Stowe	32	Ford	PHO; 2	LVS; 22	TUS; 11	MMR; 4	CAL; 11	IRW; 20	LAG; 2	KAN; 7	EVG; 16	CNS; 3	IRW; 9	RMR; 14	LVS; 8	IRW; 9		5th	1945	
2002	Matt Stowe	32	Ford	**PHO**; 3	LVS; 10	**CAL**; 1*	KAN; 3	EVG; 1	IRW; 2	S99; 4	RMR; 7	DCS; 2	LVS; 2						1st	1665	
2003	Bill McAnally Racing	16	Chevy	PHO	LVS	CAL; 7	MAD	TCR	EVG	IRW	S99	RMR	DCS	PHO	MMR				41st	146	
2004	Gene Monaco	85	Chevy	PHO	MMR	CAL; 11	S99	EVG	IRW	S99	RMR	DCS	PHO	CNS	MMR	IRW			54th	130	
2012	Jim Offenbach	31	Chevy	PHO	LHC	MMP	S99	IOW	BIR	LVS	SON; 15	EVG	CNS	IOW	PIR	SMP	AAS	PHO	67th	29	

=== ARCA Bondo/Mar-Hyde Series ===
(key) (Bold – Pole position awarded by qualifying time. Italics – Pole position earned by points standings or practice time. * – Most laps led.)

ARCA Bondo/Mar-Hyde Series results
Year	Team	No.	Make	1	2	3	4	5	6	7	8	9	10	11	12	13	14	15	16	17	18	19	20	21	22	ARSC	Pts
1998	Matt Stowe	14	Ford	DAY	ATL	SLM	CLT	MEM	MCH	POC	SBS	TOL	PPR	POC	KIL	FRS	ISF	ATL	DSF	SLM	TEX; 26	WIN	CLT	TAL	ATL	NA	-
2000		28	Ford	DAY	SLM	AND	CLT	KIL	FRS	MCH	POC	TOL	KEN	BLN	POC	WIN	ISF	KEN	DSF	SLM	CLT; 34	TAL	ATL			137th	60

Sporting positions
Preceded by Brendan Gaughan	NASCAR Winston West Series champion 2002	Succeeded by Scott Lynch
