= George S. Clinton discography =

This is the discography of American film composer George S. Clinton.

== Films ==
Year	Title	Notes	Ref.
1980	Pray TV		
1980	The Apple		
1983	Still Smokin		
1983	A Rose for Emily	Short film	
1983	Cheech & Chong Still Smokin'	Paramount film	
1984	Cheech & Chong's The Corsican Brothers		
1985	The Boys Next Door		
1986	Avenging Force		
1987	Wild Thing		
1987	American Ninja 2: The Confrontation		
1987	Too Much		
1988	The Lion of Africa	Television film	
1988	Gotham	Television film	
1988	Platoon Leader		
1989	American Ninja 3: Blood Hunt		
1989	Ten Little Indians		
1991	Hard Promises		
1991	Wild Orchid II: Two Shades of Blue		
1991	The House of Usher	21st Century Fox; Co-composer with Gary Chang	
1992	Red Shoe Diaries	Television film	
1992	Till Death Us Do Part	Television film	
1992	Cruel Doubt	Television film	
1992	Almost Pregnant	Direct-to-video	
1992	Through the Eyes of a Killer	Television film	
1993	Bonds of Love	Television film	
1993	Lake Consequence	Television film	
1993	A Kiss to Die For	Television film	
1993	Paper Hearts		
1993	Mother's Boys		
1994	Seduced by Evil	Television film	
1994	Betrayed by Love	Television film	
1994	Hellbound		
1994	Brainscan		
1994	One of Her Own	Television film	
1994	Amelia Earhart: The Final Flight	Television film	
1994	Fatal Vows: The Alexandra O'Hara Story	Television film	
1995	Tad	Television film	
1995	Top Dog		
1995	Delta of Venus		
1995	Mortal Kombat		
1995	Her Deadly Rival	Television film	
1996	The Viking Sagas	With George Fenton	
1996	Beyond the Call	Television film	
1996	The Last Days of Frankie the Fly		
1997	Heart of Fire	Television film	
1997	Beverly Hills Ninja		
1997	Austin Powers: International Man of Mystery		
1997	Business for Pleasure	Television film	
1997	Intensity		
1997	Trojan War		
1997	Mortal Kombat Annihilation		
1998	A Place Called Truth		
1998	Wild Things		
1998	Black Dog		
1998	Dollar for the Dead		
1999	Lansky		
1999	Austin Powers: The Spy Who Shagged Me		
1999	The Astronaut's Wife		
2000	Ready to Rumble		
2000	Sordid Lives		
2001	3000 Miles to Graceland		
2001	Speaking of Sex		
2001	Joe Somebody		
2002	Austin Powers in Goldmember		
2002	Shadow Realm	Television film	
2002	The Santa Clause 2		
2003	44 Minutes: The North Hollywood Shoot-Out	Television film	
2004	The Big Bounce		
2004	Catch That Kid		
2004	New York Minute		
2004	Eulogy		
2004	A Dirty Shame		
2006	Big Momma's House 2		
2006	The Santa Clause 3: The Escape Clause		
2006	Deck the Halls		
2007	Code Name: The Cleaner Bury My Heart at Wounded Knee		
2008	Older than America		
2008	Harold & Kumar Escape from Guantanamo Bay		
2008	The Love Guru		
2008	The Clique	Direct-to-video	
2009	Extract		
2009	Assassin's Creed: Lineage		
2010	Tooth Fairy		
2010	Hometown Glory	Documentary	
2011	Salvation Boulevard		
2011	Sharpay's Fabulous Adventure	Television film	
2016/1970	Multiple Maniacs	Score made for the 2016 release	
2018	Zombies	Television film	
