= Sidekicks (1992 film) =

1992 American film

- Theatrical release poster
- Directed by: Aaron Norris
- Written by: Lou Illar; Galen Thompson
- Produced by: Don Carmody
- Starring: Beau Bridges; Mako; Jonathan Brandis; Julia Nickson-Soul; Danica McKellar; Richard Moll; Joe Piscopo; Chuck Norris
- Cinematography: Joao Fernandes
- Edited by: David Rawlins; Bernard Weiser
- Music by: Alan Silvestri
- Production companies: Vision PDG; Gallery Films
- Distributed by: Triumph Films
- Release dates: December 17, 1992 (Germany); April 9, 1993 (USA)
- Running time: 101 minutes
- Country: United States
- Language: English
- Budget: $8-10 million
- Box office: $17.1 million

Sidekicks is a 1992 American adventure action comedy-drama film directed by Aaron Norris and starring Jonathan Brandis, Mako, Julia Nickson-Soul, Beau Bridges, and Chuck Norris.

== Plot ==
Barry Gabrewski is a troubled and bullied asthmatic boy who lives with his widowed father, Jerry, in Houston, Texas. A loner, Barry has vivid daydreams about fighting alongside his idol, Chuck Norris, and defeating a variety of flamboyant villains. Said foes are often personified by Barry's everyday nemeses, such as class bully Randy Cellini; Coach Horn, their loudmouthed and demanding PE instructor; and apathetic English teacher Mapes. Noreen Chan, Barry's favorite teacher, often plays the damsel-in-distress in these daydreams, most of which parody assorted Chuck Norris films (notably Missing in Action, The Delta Force, and The Hitman).

Barry wants to learn martial arts, yet he is rejected by arrogant dojo-master Kelly Stone – who also happens to be Cellini's sensei – for being too weak. Instead, he is taken on as a student by an old Chinese man named Mr. Lee, Noreen's sly uncle and the owner of a local Chinese restaurant, "Frying Dragon". Mr. Lee finds creative ways of teaching Barry to defend himself from bullies, devising training methods that increase Barry's endurance and help him control his asthma. Lee also deduces Barry's hero-worship of Norris from Barry's daydreams; he creatively incorporates this into Barry's training, devising scenarios that seem more dangerous than they are so that Barry will feel heroic for succeeding at them.

Lee enters himself, Barry, and Chan into a local team Karate tournament but is a bit stymied to learn that a team must have four members. Norris is attending the tournament as a guest and, at Lee's urging, Chan convinces Norris to join the team. Norris is both willing to help an ardent fan and has his own motivation for participating after finding out Stone is present, wanting to teach him "a lesson in humility". Barry is stunned to find himself working together with his hero.

The tournament involves four events: Breaking, Men's Weapons, Female Kata, and Freestyle fighting. Stone's team narrowly defeats Chan in the Female Kata, but Lee defeats Cellini in Breaking. True to his word, Norris defeats Stone in Freestyle fighting, and Barry – aided by a vivid daydream – scores a victory in Men's Weapons. The result is a tie between Stone's team and Lee's team. In the tie-breaker, Lee is allowed to choose the participants, and chooses Barry and Cellini, saying Barry is the member of the team with "something to prove". Stone chooses the event, Breaking. Barry is dismayed to be confronting Cellini in the latter's best event, but Lee tilts the odds in Barry's favor by using a small amount of lighter fluid to set Barry's bricks on fire. Faced with a much more heroic-seeming task, Barry wins.

After the tournament, Barry is seen talking to Norris, thanking him for his help. Norris vanishes, and it is implied that Barry has found the strength to live his life without the need for his daydreams. A young boy in a wheelchair finds Barry's Chuck Norris magazine and reacts with an excited "Wow!"

== Cast ==
- Jonathan Brandis as Barry Gabrewski
- Chuck Norris as Himself
- Beau Bridges as Jerry Gabrewski
- Mako as Mr. Lee
- Joe Piscopo as Kelly Stone
- Danica McKellar as Lauren
- John Buchanan as Randy Cellini
- Richard Moll as Mr. Horn
- Julia Nickson-Soul as Ms. Noreen Chan
- Gerrit Graham as Mr. Mapes
- Dennis Burkley as Hank
- Eric Norris as Biker Punk
- James McIngvale as Lauren's Brother

== Production ==
=== Filming ===
- 906 Zola Rd, Houston, Texas. (Barry's home)
- 2345 Blue Bonnet Blvd, Houston, TX (Lauren's Home)
- 8926 Gulf Fwy, Houston, TX 77017 (Frying Dragon location, now demolished)
- Lamar High School (Houston, Texas)
- Tranquility Park
- Wortham Theater Center
- Williams Waterwall
- Allen's Landing
- Texas Southern University
- Westchester Junior High, Spring Branch (Demolished, 1994?) (Houston, Texas)

Sidekicks was filmed primarily in Houston, TX. It was the pet project of well-known Houston furniture outlet owner Jim "Mattress Mac" McIngvale, who (in partnership with Chuck Norris and his "Kick Drugs out of Schools" campaign) invested 8 million dollars in producing this movie. Chuck Norris, who had appeared in many local television commercials for McIngvale, suggested the idea of creating this film, and McIngvale agreed to finance and produce it. In McIngvale's book, Always Think Big, he states going into film and producing was "extremely hard work".

== Reception ==
=== Box office ===
The film debuted at No. 2 at the box office. It grossed $17,180,393 during its domestic release.

=== Critical response ===
The film received largely negative reviews from critics, particularly Gene Siskel and Roger Ebert, who gave it "Two Thumbs Down". Based on 19 reviews gathered, the film has a 26% from Rotten Tomatoes, with an average score of 4/10.
