= Chuck Norris filmography =

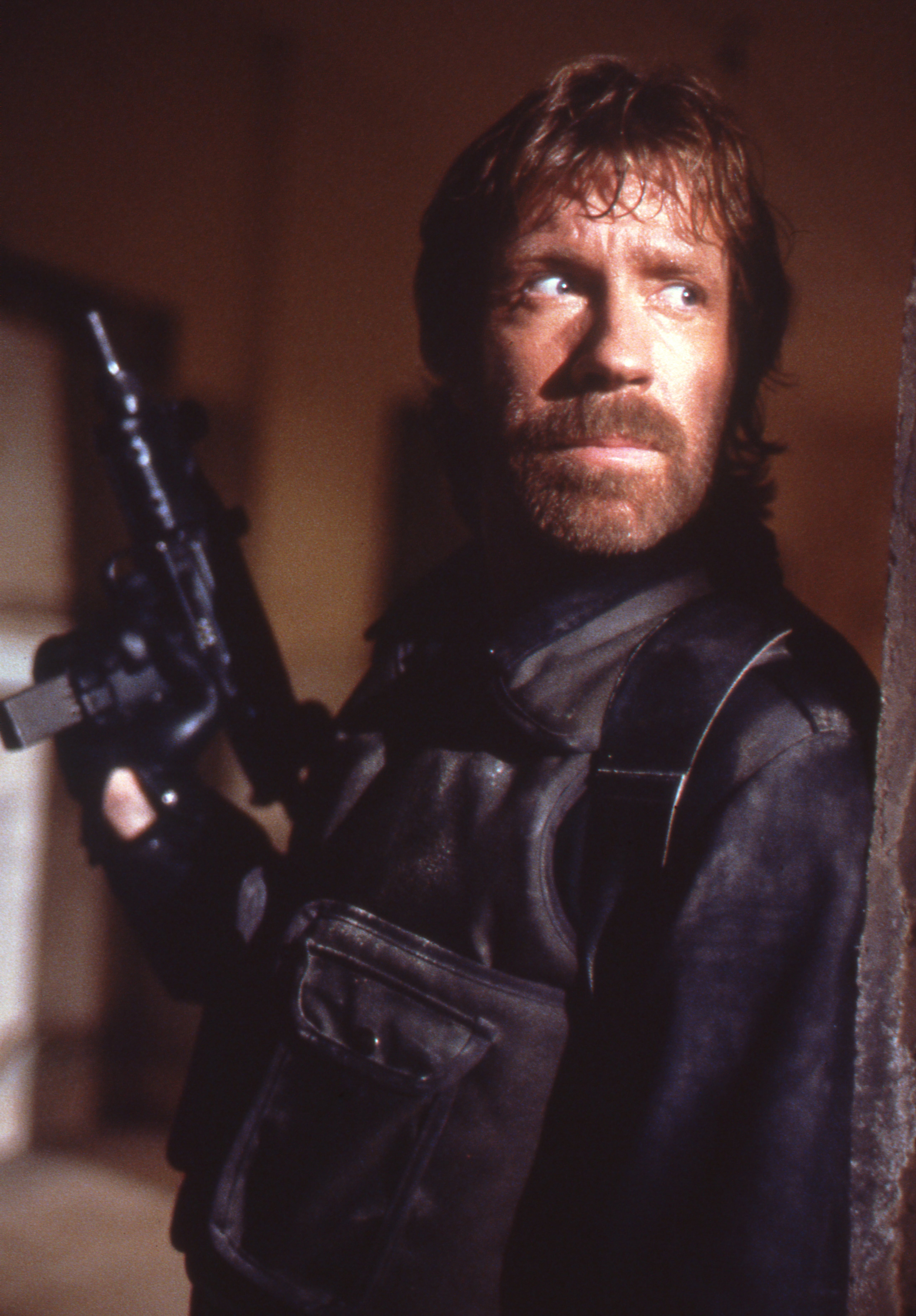
Norris is Major Scott McCoy on the set of The Delta Force (1986)

Chuck Norris was an American actor and martial artist. He appeared in a number of action films, such as The Way of the Dragon, in which he starred alongside Bruce Lee, and was The Cannon Group's leading star in the 1980s. He played the starring role in the television series Walker, Texas Ranger.

== Film ==
Year	Title	Role	Notes	Ref.
1968	The Wrecking Crew	Man in the House of 7 Joys	Uncredited extra	
1972	The Way of the Dragon	Colt		
1973	The Student Teachers	Karate Advisor	Cameo	
1974	Yellow Faced Tiger	Chuck Slaughter / Himself	Also released as "Slaughter in San Francisco"	
1977	Breaker! Breaker!	John David "J.D." Dawes	Also fight choreographer	
1978	Good Guys Wear Black	Major John T. Booker	Also martial arts choreographer	
1979	A Force of One	Matt Logan	Also fight choreographer	
1980	The Octagon	Scott James	Also fight choreographer	
1981	An Eye for an Eye	Detective Sean Kane		
1982	Silent Rage	Sheriff Daniel "Dan" Stevens		
1982	Forced Vengeance	Chief Joshua Harrin "Josh" Randall		
1983	Lone Wolf McQuade	Ranger Jim "J.J." McQuade		
1984	Missing in Action	Colonel James Thomas Braddock		
1985	Missing in Action 2: The Beginning	Colonel James Thomas Braddock		
1985	Code of Silence	Sergeant Eddie Cusack		
1985	Invasion U.S.A.	Agent Matt Hunter	Also writer	
1986	The Delta Force	Major Scott McCoy		
1986	Firewalker	Max Donigan		
1988	Braddock: Missing in Action III	Colonel James Thomas Braddock	Also writer	
1988	Hero and the Terror	Detective Danny O'Brien		
1990	Delta Force 2: The Colombian Connection	Colonel Scott McCoy		
1991	The Hitman	Detective Cliff Garret / Danny Grogan		
1992	Sidekicks	Himself	Limited release; also executive producer	
1993	Chuck Norris: Private Lesson	Himself	Direct-to-video; also writer and executive producer	
1994	Hellbound	Sergeant Frank Shatter		
1995	Top Dog	Lieutenant Jake Wilder		
1996	Forest Warrior	Jebediah McKenna	Direct-to-video	
2003	Bells of Innocence	Matthew	Limited release	
2004	Dodgeball: A True Underdog Story	Himself	Cameo	
2004	Birdie & Bogey	None	Limited release; еxecutive producer only	
2005	The Cutter	Detective John Shepherd	Direct-to-video; also executive producer	
2012	The Expendables 2	Booker "The Lone Wolf"		
2024	Agent Recon	Captain Alastair	Streaming release	
2027	Zombie Plane	Himself	Completed; cameo, posthumous release	

== Television ==
Year	Title	Role	Notes	Ref.
1970	Room 222	Himself	Episode: "Dreams of Glory"; cameo	
1986	Karate Kommandos	Himself	5 episodes; voice role	
1993	Wind in the Wire	Himself	Television film; cameo	
1993–2001	Walker, Texas Ranger	Sergeant Ranger Cordell Walker / Hayes Cooper	196 episodes; also executive producer for 80 episodes and story for 6 episodes	
1998	Logan's War: Bound by Honor	Ranger Jake Fallon	Television film; also story and executive producer	
1999	Sons of Thunder	Sergeant Ranger Cordell Walker	4 episodes; also executive producer for 6 episodes and creator for 1 episode	
2000	Martial Law	Sergeant Ranger Cordell Walker	Episode: "Honor Among Strangers"	
2000	The President's Man	Agent Joshua McCord	Television film; also executive producer	
2002	The President's Man: A Line in the Sand	Agent Joshua McCord	Television film; also executive producer	
2003	Yes, Dear	Himself	Episode: "Jimmy and Chuck"	
2004	Late Night with Conan O’Brien	Himself	Guest performer, episode dated 08/09/2004	
2005	Walker, Texas Ranger: Trial by Fire	Captain Ranger Cordell Walker	Television film; also executive producer	
2007	Inside World Combat League	None	Television film; executive producer only	
2015	The Goldbergs	Himself	Episode: "Boy Barry"; voice role	
2019	Chuck Norris's Epic Guide to Military Vehicles	Himself	Television special; also executive producer	
2020	Hawaii Five-0	Sergeant Major Lee Phillips	Episode: "A ʻohe ia e loaʻa aku, he ulua kapapa no ka moana"; cameo	

== Commercials ==
Year	Title	Role	Notes	Ref.
1993	Right Guard	Himself		
1997	Dodge Ram	Himself		
2010	CForce	Himself		
2011	World of Warcraft	Himself	Hunter	
2012	WBK Bank Commercial	Himself		
2017	UnitedHealthcare- Lunch vs Chuck	Himself		
2018	Toyota Tacoma	Himself		
2021	World of Tanks Holiday Ops	Himself		

== Soundtrack appearances ==
Year	Title	Song	Notes	Ref.
1996	Walker, Texas Ranger	"Eyes Of The Ranger"	Episode: "A Ranger Christmas"; uncredited	

== Video games ==
Year	Title	Role	Notes	Ref.
1984	Chuck Norris Superkicks	Himself	Licensed likeness and cover model.	
2008	Chuck Norris: Bring On the Pain	Himself	Licensed likeness.	
2020	World of Tanks: Holiday Ops	Himself		
2023	Crime Boss: Rockay City	Himself		

== Bibliography ==
- "Chuck Norris Filmography". Movies & TV Dept. The New York Times. 2012. Archived from the original on August 24, 2012.
