= Aaron Norris =

American filmmaker and actor (born 1951)

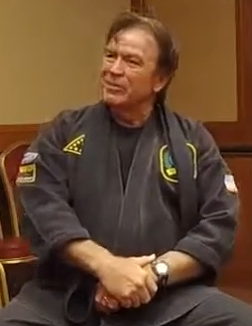
- Norris in 2019
- Born: Aaron Dee Norris; November 23, 1951 (age 74); Gardena, California, U.S.
- Occupations: Film producer; screenwriter; film director
- Years active: 1972–present
- Spouse: Rebecca Norris (m. 1968)
- Children: 8
- Relatives: Chuck Norris (brother); Mike Norris (nephew); Eric Norris (nephew)

Aaron Dee Norris (born November 23, 1951) is an American stunt performer, director, occasional actor, and film and television producer. He is the younger brother of actor Chuck Norris.

== Career ==
=== 1974–1988: Stunt work to directing ===
While his older brother Chuck Norris was on his rise to stardom, Aaron Norris began his career as an uncredited stunt man in movies such as Black Belt Jones (1974), Speedtrap (1977), and Breaker! Breaker! (1977) (his brother Chuck's starring debut). The following year, he was hired again as martial arts choreographer (credited) and a stunt double (uncredited) for his brother's second film Good Guys Wear Black- where he acted, credited, as "Al" one of the "Black Tigers" in an early scene- (1978) directed by Ted Post. He is noted to have performed the flying sidekick through the windshield of a speeding car, the stunt that sold the movie. He also played a small role in this movie. Later on that same year, director Ted Post re-collaborated with Norris who is a credited stuntman for Post's film Go Tell the Spartans and was a stunt coordinator for the John Carpenter film Elvis starring Kurt Russell.

In 1979, Norris played Anderson in A Force of One starring his brother Chuck, with whom he shared the fight choreography credit. Norris is also credited as the stunt coordinator and listed amongst the stuntmen. The director noted that Aaron wanted to learn everything and was a real asset to the picture. Because of this the director had him to focus on the martial art, and the specific of the fighting. The same year, he was also a stuntman for the Italian film The Visitor.

In 1980, Norris did the Karate fight choreography and played the role of Hatband for his brother's film The Octagon.

In 1981, with his brother playing the lead, Norris was stunt player in Steve Carver's An Eye for an Eye.

In 1982, Norris was an associate producer and a stunt person in his brother's film Silent Rage.

In 1983, Norris was again an associate producer on a film starring Chuck, Steve Carver's Lone Wolf McQuade, where he also did stunt coordination and played a small role.

During that decade, he worked as the stunt coordinator for I, the Jury with Armand Assante, White Water Rebels with James Brolin, Chained Heat with Linda Blair, the dance film Breakin', Lies with Ann Dusenberry, and The Naked Cage with Shari Shattuck.

In 1988, he directed Braddock: Missing in Action III. That same year, he also directed the war drama Platoon Leader, starring Michael Dudikoff.

=== 1990–2002: Subsequent projects ===
Norris continued directing with his brother as the lead in: Delta Force 2 (1990), The Hitman, Sidekicks (1993), Hellbound (1994), Top Dog (1995) and Forest Warrior (1996).

In 1995, he produced the film Ripper Man.

In 1996, he played the leading man in the film Overkill. That year, he started to work on his brother's long lasting TV show Walker, Texas Ranger (1993–2001), during his tenure he served as an executive producer for 168 television episodes. He wrote and directed four episodes.

In 1998, Norris was an executive producer and participated to writing the story of for the CBS television film Logan's War: Bound by Honor. Sharing the lead with Chuck is actor Eddie Cibrian. The television-film was ranked third among the thirteen most viewed shows of that week.

In 1999, he created and was an executive producer on the Walker, Texas Ranger spin-off Sons of Thunder.

In the early 2000, Norris was an executive producer for the CBS television films The President's Man (2000), and The President's Man: A Line in the Sand (2002).

=== 2005–present: Current work ===
In 2005, Norris was an executive producer and acted in the film The Cutter. That same year, he returned to directing with the CBS Movie of the Week, Walker, Texas Ranger: Trial by Fire. A continuation of the series Walker, Texas Ranger, with Chuck Norris reprising his role.

In 2007, he produced the documentary Inside Aphasia.

In 2009, Norris produced Bill Duke's Not Easily Broken starring Morris Chestnut and Taraji P. Henson. That same year, he also produced the film Everyday Life with Brad Hawkins. That year, he worked on stunts on the Luc Besson film I Love You Phillip Morris. Also in 2009, he was named the "president of development and production" of ALN, formerly The American Life Network.

In 2010, he provided stunts for the film Skateland.

In 2015, he provided utility stunts for the Marvel Comics film Ant-Man starring Paul Rudd.

== Personal life ==
Aaron is the younger brother of Chuck Norris (1940–2026) and Wieland Clyde Norris (1943–1970). During the Vietnam War, both Aaron and his older brother Wieland enlisted in the United States Army. Wieland was killed in action in Vietnam in 1970.

On December 2, 2010, Aaron, along with brother Chuck, was given the title honorary Texas Ranger by Texas Governor Rick Perry.

== Director ==
Year	Title	Notes
1988	Braddock: Missing in Action III	
1988	Platoon Leader	
1990	Delta Force 2: The Colombian Connection	
1991	The Hitman	
1992	Sidekicks	
1993	Good Cop/Bad Cop	
1994	Hellbound	
1995	Top Dog	
1996	Forest Warrior	
1996–2001	Walker, Texas Ranger	Television (TV series - 4 episodes)
2005	Walker, Texas Ranger: Trial by Fire	Television film

== Producer ==
Year	Title	Notes
1982	Silent Rage	associate producer
1983	Lone Wolf McQuade	associate producer
1995	Ripper Man	Producer
1996–2001	Walker, Texas Ranger (TV series – 123 episodes)	executive producer
1998	Logan's War: Bound by Honor	executive producer
1999	Sons of Thunder (TV series – 6 episodes)	executive producer
2000	The President's Man	executive producer
2002	The President's Man: A Line in the Sand	executive producer
2005	Walker, Texas Ranger: Trial by Fire	executive producer
2005	The Cutter	executive producer
2007	Inside Aphasia	Producer
2009	Not Easily Broken	Producer
2009	Everyday Life	Producer
2020	Army of One	Producer

== Stunts ==
Year	Title	Notes
1974	Black Belt Jones	stunts - uncredited
1977	Breaker! Breaker!	stunt double: Chuck Norris - uncredited
1977	Speedtrap	stunts - uncredited
1978	Good Guys Wear Black	martial arts choreographer / stunt double: Chuck Norris - uncredited
1978	Go Tell the Spartans	stunts
1978	Elvis	stunt coordinator
1979	The Visitor	stuntman
1979	A Force of One	fight choreographer / stunt coordinator / stunt double: Chuck Norris - uncredited / stunts
1980	The Octagon	fight choreographer / stunt coordinator
1981	An Eye for an Eye	stunt coordinator / stunts
1982	Silent Rage	stunt coordinator / stunts
1982	I, the Jury	assistant stunt coordinator
1982	Forced Vengeance	stunt coordinator
1983	White Water Rebels	stunts
1983	Lone Wolf McQuade	stunt coordinator
1983	Chained Heat	stunt player
1984	Breakin'	stunts
1984	Missing in Action	stunt coordinator
1985	Missing in Action 2: The Beginning	stunt coordinator / stunts - uncredited
1985	Code of Silence	stunt coordinator
1985	Lies	stunts
1985	Invasion U.S.A.	stunt coordinator
1986	The Naked Cage	stunt player
1986	Firewalker	stunt coordinator
2009	I Love You Phillip Morris	stunts
2010	Skateland	stunts
2015	Ant-Man	utility stunts

== Actor ==
Year	Title	Role	Note
1978	Good Guys Wear Black	Al – The Black Tigers	Debut film
1979	A Force of One	Anderson	
1980	The Octagon	Hatband	
1981	Raider Stone	Unknown	
1983	Deadly Force	Guard No. 3	
1983	Lone Wolf McQuade	Punk	
1996	Overkill	Jack Hazard	First lead role
2005	The Cutter	Tony Maylam	
