= Half-Pint (disambiguation) =

A half pint has two common meanings: half of a pint (a unit of volume) or an expression for a short person or small child.

Half-pint or Half Pint may also refer to:

- Half Pint, stage name of Jamaican reggae singer Lindon Roberts (born 1961)
- Half-Pint, stage name of Cassandra Jackson, a rapper in Son of Bazerk, a hip-hop band
- Don "Half Pint" Santos, former member of the American R&B group IMx
- Half-Pint, nickname of Frankie Jaxon (c. 1896-1953), vaudeville singer, stage designer and comedian
- Half-Pint, nickname of Gene Rye (1906-1980), Major League baseball player
- Half-Pint, nickname of character Le Van Hawke portrayed by actor Roland Harrah III
- Half-Pint, nickname of character Laura Ingalls Wilder portrayed by actor Melissa Gilbert
- "Half-Pint", an episode of the TV series Airwolf

== See also ==
- Half Pints Brewing Company, a Canadian craft brewery
