= Delta Force 2: The Colombian Connection =

1990 film by Aaron Norris

- United States theatrical release poster
- Directed by: Aaron Norris
- Written by: Lee Reynolds
- Based on: Characters by James Bruner; Menahem Golan
- Produced by: Yoram Globus; Christopher Pearce
- Starring: Chuck Norris; Billy Drago; John P. Ryan; Richard Jaeckel; Paul Perri; Begoña Plaza; Héctor Mercado; Mark Margolis
- Cinematography: João Fernandes
- Edited by: Michael J. Duthie
- Music by: Frédéric Talgorn
- Production company: The Cannon Group
- Distributed by: Metro-Goldwyn-Mayer
- Release date: August 24, 1990
- Running time: 111 minutes
- Country: United States
- Languages: English; Spanish
- Budget: $16 million
- Box office: $6.7 million (domestic)

Delta Force 2: The Colombian Connection (also known as Delta Force 2: Operation Stranglehold or simply Delta Force 2) is a 1990 American action film directed by Aaron Norris and starring Chuck Norris as Colonel Scott McCoy. It is a sequel to the 1986 film The Delta Force and the second installment in the series.

The film follows McCoy and his Delta Force team as they attempt to stop drug lord Ramón Cota and dismantle his drug-trafficking operation in the fictional South American country of San Carlos.

The film was produced by The Cannon Group and distributed by Metro-Goldwyn-Mayer. Although set primarily in South America, much of the film was shot in the Philippines, with additional filming taking place in Tennessee. Production was interrupted by a helicopter crash in the Philippines on May 16, 1989, which killed four members of the film crew and later resulted in the death of actor Geoff Brewer. Production subsequently resumed after a six-week hiatus.

Delta Force 2: The Colombian Connection was released in the United States on August 24, 1990. It received generally negative reviews from critics, who criticised its screenplay, clichés, acting and similarities to Norris's earlier films for Cannon.

The film grossed approximately $6.7 million in the United States against a reported budget of $16 million. It was followed by Delta Force 3: The Killing Game in 1991, which featured an entirely new cast.

== Plot ==
Ramón Cota is a narcoterrorist and cartel boss from the fictional nation of San Carlos. The United States' DEA battles to stop the flow of his cocaine into the United States. An undercover task force led by DEA agents conducts surveillance on a private party that Cota is attending during a carnival in Rio de Janeiro. After Cota's hitmen ambush and massacre the team, the DEA enlists support from the U.S. Army's Delta Force to infiltrate San Carlos, aided by an undercover agent inside Cota's cartel. General Taylor orders Colonel Scott McCoy and his deputy, Major Bobby Chavez, to bring Cota to justice.

McCoy and Chavez, posing as airline passengers, track Cota during a flight to Geneva where he deposits his drug money in a Swiss bank account. They capture him during a short interval in which the plane enters U.S. airspace. Cota posts bail and is released from custody. Cota retaliates against Chavez, who confronted him during the hearing, by ordering the murder of Chavez's pregnant wife. Chavez pursues Cota and is captured, tortured and killed. Three more DEA agents are also taken hostage and scheduled for execution. During a press conference, a DEA spokesman explains that San Carlos's president, Alcazar, fears a coup and is therefore reluctant to crack down on the cartels, while corrupt generals benefit from the drug trade and protect Cota from extradition.

McCoy parachutes into San Carlos to rescue the hostages in a stealth operation while Taylor and the rest of the Delta Force provide surveillance. Ernesto Flores, a liaison from the government of San Carlos, accompanies them. San Carlos' agreement with the U.S. government severely limits the scope of the operation. McCoy scales a tall cliff and infiltrates Cota's mansion. The government of San Carlos unexpectedly stages a large drug raid intended to make the American mission unnecessary. Taylor breaks protocol and flies to the mansion in a heavily armed gunship, prompting the San Carlos army to send its own helicopters in pursuit. Taylor's gunship lands at Cota's mansion and deploys troops to destroy the drug storehouses and laboratories. McCoy releases the hostages but is captured by Cota and placed in a chamber filled with toxic gas. Before the gas can kill McCoy, a rocket from Taylor's gunship shatters a glass wall, allowing him to escape.

DEA Agent Page and McCoy capture Cota in his armored limousine and flee the mansion pursude by his bodyguards and a San Carlos attack chopper. Cota's captured limo is brought to a halt, and Taylor's gunship rescues them, but not before Cota escapes in the confusion into the jungle. He kills a villager who wanted revenge for the murder of her family, and McCoy catches up to him. McCoy assaults Cota with his bare hands, and Cota attempts to goad McCoy into killing him, knowing that he's wanted alive.

Taylor's gunship arrives to pick up McCoy and the captured Cota with ropes. The last of Cota's men close in and partially severs the rope hauling Cota up. The gunship flies out to sea to join the American carrier fleet with Cota still hanging below. Cota goads McCoy about his invulnerability to prosecution and boasts he'll walk free again. The weakened rope snaps and Cota falls to his death.

== Cast ==
- Chuck Norris as Colonel Scott McCoy, the commander of the Delta Force team.
- Billy Drago as Ramón Cota, a drug lord and the film's main antagonist.
- John P. Ryan as General Taylor, a senior military officer involved in the operation against Cota.
- Richard Jaeckel as DEA Agent John Page, a federal agent involved in the operation against Cota.
- Paul Perri as Major Bobby Chávez, McCoy's close friend and a member of the Delta Force team.
- Begoña Plaza as Quiquina Esquilinta, a villager caught up in the violence surrounding Cota and assisting McCoy.
- Héctor Mercado as Miguel, a mole inside Cota’s organisation.
- Mark Margolis as General Olmedo, a senior San Carlos military official supporting Cota’s drug operation.

The supporting cast also includes Mateo Gómez (Note: Also known as Matthew Gómez.) as Ernesto Flores, a San Carlos government liaison; Ruth de Sosa as Rita Chávez, Bobby's wife; Rick Prieto as Carlos, one of Cota's henchmen; and Kelly Wicker as a judge.

== Pre-production ==
=== Writing ===
==== Early sequel concepts ====
Screenwriter James Bruner was tasked with developing a sequel to The Delta Force. He was sent to London to meet with filmmaker Michael Winner and develop a story, with the intention of having Chuck Norris and Lee Marvin reprise their roles as Scott McCoy and Nick Alexander, respectively. Some early promotional and concept posters for a potential sequel included references to Marvin's name and likeness. For example, a revised second-draft screenplay titled Delta Force II - dated May 15, 1986 - was offered at auction as part of material from Marvin's estate.

According to Bruner, Winner subsequently took control of the writing process, and the script became substantially different from Bruner's original work. Bruner recalled that "the script just got goofier and goofier" and said that although the final screenplay was submitted under his name, it was not the script he had written. The story department at Cannon Films was reportedly dissatisfied with the result.

The project later developed under the working title Delta Force 2: Spitfire, with Michael Dudikoff attached to star and Albert Pyun set to direct. Steve James was also expected to reprise his role as Bobby. The proposed story would have followed Dudikoff and James as they attempted to prevent terrorists from destroying a nuclear reactor in Florida. The project was ultimately abandoned.

Bruner was also involved with a proposed Delta Force television series while Missing in Action III was in production. According to Trunick, Menahem Golan was dissatisfied with the terms offered by CBS, and the project did not proceed.

==== Development of The Colombian Connection ====
The screenplay that became Delta Force 2: The Colombian Connection originated as a standalone project titled Stranglehold. Film historian Austin Trunick's account describes the screenplay as being adapted into a sequel to The Delta Force, with the characters, setting and premise being substantially changed during development.

The final film was also referred to as Delta Force 2: Operation Stranglehold in contemporary promotional material, including the U.S. theatrical release poster and home-video market.

The development of Stranglehold took place during a period of financial difficulty for Cannon Films. Contemporary reports described the company's growing debt and financial restructuring, including an agreement with Warner Communications in 1986 and subsequent efforts to reduce costs. Trunick places the development of The Colombian Connection within this period of increasingly constrained production budgets.

By the later stages of development, Golan had left Cannon Films. The screenplay was subsequently developed around Chuck Norris's interest in South American drug trafficking. Norris recalled in a 1990 interview reading about a powerful, unnamed South American drug lord and hiring writer Lee Reynolds to research the subject and develop a screenplay. Norris said that the research process took place over several years:

"Much of what I read convinced me that you're dealing with unconscionable, truly vicious individuals. It's true, there are some changes in Colombia, but the fighting is still going on, and these people are other places as well. And what you're fighting is billions of dollars. That much money means an enormous amount of power. That's why we portrayed our kingpin that vindictively. It happens. They feel they're above the law, and when you get in their way, they don't just go after you. They kill your wife, aunts, uncles, all relatives. They eliminate your lineage".

Norris also discussed revisions to the screenplay during its development. In December 1988, he said that the script was being rewritten and that he preferred to resolve problems during the writing stage rather than during production:

"It's better to straighten out the problems in the screenplay now, rather than later. I hate it when you start a movie with a script half done; chances are you'll end up with a mediocre movie. The first [installment] was well written".

Norris said that his research into drug trafficking influenced the depiction of the film's antagonist, Ramón Cota. He described major drug traffickers as possessing substantial wealth and power and said that these observations informed the character's violent behavior.

=== Casting ===
Lee Marvin had reportedly maintained a good relationship with Golan during the production of The Delta Force and was interested in further projects with Cannon Films. Marvin, however, was in poor health during production of the first film and died in 1987, making his return to the sequel impossible.

Jean-Claude Van Damme was offered a role in the film but declined it in order to star in Cyborg.

Van Damme later recalled training with Norris three times a week and being employed by Norris during his early years in the United States.

Billy Drago in character as Ramón Cota.

Billy Drago was cast as the film's villain. It was his third collaboration with Norris, following Invasion U.S.A. (1985) and Hero and the Terror (1988).

Drago said that he viewed the character as a conventional villain and drew loosely on his knowledge of Pablo Escobar when approaching the role. Furthermore:

"It is, in a sense, a straight-ahead action picture and you're talking about Good vs. Evil", said Drago, "and it is pretty black and white. . . . It's not a matter of becoming someone else as it is really more a matter of finding that dark part of myself that everybody has someplace. I also approach it from an amoral point of view rather than immoral. He was not some cokehead going nuts. And in a sense, that made him scarier...."

Rick Prieto, who portrayed Carlos, Ramón Cota's bodyguard and enforcer, was a longtime associate of Chuck Norris. Prieto trained under Norris and became a ninth-degree black belt in the Chuck Norris System. He worked with Norris on several film productions, beginning with A Force of One (1979), which served as Prieto's acting debut.

Berto Spoor was initially cast for three to four days' work as a skinhead. He was not keen on shaving his head and was subsequently recast as a Delta Force soldier, extending his work on the production to several weeks. He had previously worked with Chuck Norris on Missing in Action (1984) and Missing in Action III (1988).

== Production ==
=== Filming ===
Wreckage of the helicopter involved in the fatal crash during production in Tagaytay.

Much of the film was shot in Tagaytay, Philippines, where production was seriously affected by a helicopter crash near an unfinished hilltop mansion. Four people were killed in the crash and ten others were injured. The fatalities included electricians Don Marshall and Mike Graham, cameraman Gaddi Dansig, and pilot Jojo Imperial; actor Geoff Brewer later died from injuries sustained in the accident, bringing the death toll to five.

Chuck Norris said he had left the set approximately 30 minutes before the accident and had worked closely with those who died for several years. He emphasised that the helicopter sequence was not a stunt, saying that the shot simply required the helicopter to lift off. The accident subsequently resulted in lawsuits against Cannon Films and Aaron Norris. Aaron Norris rejected claims that safety had been a low priority, describing the crash as a tragic accident and maintaining that no one was at fault.

The unfinished hilltop mansion in the mountain resort of Tagaytay was called the People's Park in the Sky. Imelda Marcos had started building it in 1983 as a guest house for a visit by then-US president Ronald Reagan that never took place.

"It had never been used", Chuck Norris said in 1990. "When Marcos was booted out, it was just left, an empty shell. We bought it, made $1 million worth of refurbishments, since it wasn't in good shape, and even built a swimming pool. And then we blew it up."

==== Helicopter crash ====
On May 16, 1989, the unit had been filming for two months and was due to finish on May 27. An SA 360 Dauphin helicopter took off to film a scene, then veered to the left and plunged into a 40-foot ravine. Four people on board were killed in the crash: electricians Don Marshall and Mike Graham, cameraman Gaddi Danzig, and pilot Jojo Imperial. Actor Geoff Brewer subsequently died from injuries sustained in the accident, bringing the total number of fatalities to five.

Norris stated that production shut down for six weeks so that the cast and crew could recuperate. He said that the casualties were his close friends. He also stated that production in the Philippines could have continued, but the cast and crew were "so devastated" that they had to return to the United States to "get our minds functioning again."

The film was dedicated to the memory of the crew members killed during production.

This was the second helicopter accident in a Norris film. The first occurred during the filming of Missing in Action III in the Philippines, when four soldiers working as extras were killed in the crash of a military helicopter rented by the film company.

Eric Hahn performed stunt work on the film and appeared in two scenes as a prisoner at Cota's compound. In a 2005 account of his experiences on the production, Hahn described Chuck Norris as "the nicest and friendliest of all the major actors that I ever met", recalling that Norris would spend hours signing autographs and posing for photographs. Hahn contrasted this with his assessment of director Aaron Norris, whom he described as temperamental and alleged would "scream at the crew constantly". According to Hahn, some crew members left the production because of what he regarded as Aaron Norris's persistent rudeness. Hahn also recalled that Chuck Norris appeared at times to be "ashamed" of his brother's behavior.

Hahn also discussed the helicopter accident. According to his account, the pilot had raised concerns about the helicopter's maintenance and proposed postponing filming until the following day. Hahn said that Aaron Norris became angry at the suggestion and threatened to replace the pilot if he did not proceed, after which filming went ahead as planned. Hahn stated that a stunt coordinator was subsequently reprimanded by SAG-AFTRA following the accident. He nevertheless attributed responsibility for the circumstances surrounding the incident to Aaron Norris rather than the stunt coordinator.

Numerous production crew members were reportedly fired because of difficulties obtaining three Sikorsky helicopters. The Philippine government was reluctant to provide the helicopters following a previous accident during the production of Missing in Action III.

"It turned out to be impossible to get any Sikorsky so an alternative was found in a small French Dauphine, not big enough [for the intended film scenes]," actor Berto Spoor said in 2013.

Spoor narrowly missed being involved in the accident because he was on personal leave from the production. He attributed the accident to a combination of the pilot's inexperience with the aircraft and the condition of the Dauphine, which he described as "an unwilling plane that didn't have a full check up and had been grounded for several years" before its use in the production.

==== Conflicting reports ====
Contemporary reports differed in some details concerning the number of people hospitalized and the eventual death toll. An Associated Press report published in The New York Times stated that approximately 10 people were hospitalized following the crash, including actors John P. Ryan and Mateo Gómez, who portrayed General Taylor and Ernesto Flores, respectively. The Los Angeles Times likewise reported that 10 people were hospitalized.

The initial reports identified four fatalities. Actor Geoff Brewer subsequently died from injuries sustained in the accident, bringing the final reported death toll to five. The differences between the early reports and later accounts therefore largely reflect the subsequent death of Brewer rather than a separate accident.

The contemporary reporting provides the basic account of the accident, while later interviews and documentary material provide additional testimony concerning what witnesses and participants observed at the scene.

==== Documentary accounts ====
The accident was examined in the 1989 documentary Chopper Down: Helicopter Deaths in the Movies, which included testimony from people involved in the production and relatives of those killed.

Costume designer Katherine Dover, who witnessed the accident, recalled that the helicopter rose approximately 10–15 feet before moving toward a guardrail and hovering briefly. She said she then heard a sound resembling a car with a stuck carburettor before seeing the helicopter angle and fall. Dover described the immediate aftermath, saying that smoke became so thick that it was difficult to see the wreckage and that stunt performers ran toward the site calling for water and fire extinguishers, but that neither was available. She further stated that the two vehicles designated as ambulances were empty vans containing mattresses and had no medical supplies, including plasma, oxygen or bandages. According to Dover, injured and deceased people were placed in vehicles and taken toward a hospital, while those involved were initially uncertain about where to take them.

Left to right: Mateo Gómez and John P. Ryan during a helicopter sequence.

Actor Mateo Gómez, who survived the crash, recalled hearing what he described as a "dry boom" before the helicopter struck its tail and fell. He said that he suffered severe facial injuries and that swelling around his left eye was so extensive that medical personnel in the Philippines considered removing the eye to relieve pressure around his skull.

Stunt coordinator Dean Ferrandini said in the documentary that the accident occurred during what he regarded as a simple helicopter takeoff rather than a stunt. He said that the production had doctors and ambulances available. International Stunt Association president Jack Gill disputed the distinction, saying that stunt coordinators generally regarded a helicopter takeoff as a stunt and that helicopters should be used prudently and as safely as possible.

"This was not a stunt," contended Norris in 1990, in similar view to Ferrandini. "All the shot called for was the helicopter to lift off. It was nothing like the Twilight Zone thing." Asked if he had any lingering views about the incident, he stated, "Yes, of course. They were close friends of mine. All the guys that died were guys I’d worked with for the last six years. We’d all been on the helicopter the day it went down. I’d just left the set about a half hour [before the crash]. It was just God’s will that I wasn’t on it or Aaron [my brother and the film's director] wasn’t on it."

Screen Actors Guild National Stunt Safety chairman Bob Carlson said that he had heard that the helicopter had been inactive for several years before being used in the production and questioned whether it had been airworthy. Carlson presented this as information he had heard rather than as an established finding concerning the cause of the accident.

Stuntman Charlie Brewer, whose brother Geoff Brewer died following the accident, questioned whether the lives of film workers were worth a "superhuman effort" to protect. He said that the victims were good people who did not deserve to die and questioned how many lives the film industry would have to lose before such accidents stopped.

Geoff Brewer's widow, Tammy Brewer, said that the effects created by stunt performers should remain make-believe and that her husband and the father of her children "could very well be alive today" if financial considerations had not taken precedence over safety. She added that, although it was difficult to point the finger at anyone, she sometimes felt that the accident could have been prevented.

=== Filming after the crash ===
Following the helicopter accident, the production considered alternative locations, including Puerto Rico. It ultimately transferred to Tennessee to complete filming.

== Release ==
In 1989, the film was screened at the Senate Theater in Washington, D.C., for an audience of approximately 800 people, including members of Congress and their families. Chuck Norris and his brother Aaron were seated in the front row alongside Senators Pete Wilson and Bob Dole.

=== Theatrical ===
The film was released in theaters in the United States on August 24, 1990.

=== Marketing ===
MGM spent $5 million on television advertising.

=== Home video ===
The film was released on VHS in the United States by Media Home Entertainment in 1990. In the United Kingdom, a rental VHS was released in 1991 by Cannon Video and MGM/UA Home Video, with distribution through Warner Home Video.

Initial VHS copies distributed in the United States referred to the film using the Operation Stranglehold subheading. The film was released on DVD in the United States by MGM on September 19, 2000. The DVD presents the film in its original 1.85:1 aspect ratio and includes French and Spanish subtitles. A UK MGM DVD was released on November 13, 2000, presented in anamorphic widescreen with English audio and subtitles, and included theatrical trailers as bonus material.

== Reception ==
=== Box office ===
The film opened with $1.85 million in 909 U.S. theaters. It ranked 11th for its opening weekend, and ultimately grossed about $6.7 million domestically against a reported $16 million budget.

=== Critical reception ===
On Rotten Tomatoes, the film has an approval rating of 11% based on nine critics.

==== Contemporary reviews ====
Early reviews were predominantly negative.

Chris Hicks of Deseret News criticised the film's inconsistent title. He noted that the film's press material used Delta Force 2: Operation Stranglehold, while the opening credits used Delta Force 2 and the end credits used Delta Force 2: The Colombian Connection. Hicks characterised the screenplay as a collection of stereotypes and clichés and wrote that although the film contained some elaborate stunts, they were insufficient to compensate for its weaknesses.

Kevin Thomas of the Los Angeles Times compared the film unfavourably with its predecessor. He wrote that if the first Delta Force "played like a formula TV movie", its sequel was "not even that". He criticised the film's "cardboard and stereotypical" characterisations and "trite" plotting, arguing that these weaknesses prevented its elaborate parachuting and helicopter sequences from having much dramatic impact. Thomas also described the film as notable for its "nonstop violence" while singling out Billy Drago's performance as Ramón Cota as "the strongest presence in the picture".

Sid Smith of the Chicago Tribune was similarly critical, although his review focused more on the film's appeal as an exaggerated Chuck Norris action vehicle. Smith described the production as "serious stuff" while discussing Norris's established screen persona and the film's cartoon-like approach to violence. He criticised the simplistic nature of the story and characters but recognised that the film was aimed at audiences seeking a Norris-style action spectacle.

Stephen Holden of The New York Times also gave the film an unfavourable assessment. Published the day after its United States theatrical release, Holden's review treated the film as a conventional Norris action vehicle and criticised its formulaic qualities and reliance on the star's established persona.

The contemporary reviews therefore focused primarily on the film's clichéd screenplay, stereotypical characterisation, excessive violence and formulaic approach. Critics nevertheless acknowledged the scale of its action sequences, while Thomas singled out Drago's performance as a particular strength.

==== Academic analysis ====
Academic scholars Yobenj Aucardo Chicangana Bayona and Paula Andrea Barreiro Posada argue that Hollywood films portray Colombia through stereotypes, with films such as Delta Force 2: The Colombian Connection contributing to a broader depiction of Colombia as a generic and violent Latin American setting.

Chicangana Bayona and Barreiro Posada argue that the film's fictional South American setting, San Carlos, is based on Colombia, while its depiction of drug trafficking, corruption and political instability is exaggerated.

Film scholar Hugo Chaparro Valderrama similarly cited the film as an example of Hollywood constructing exoticized, stereotype-driven narratives about Colombia while avoiding filming within the country itself, noting that the production was shot entirely in third countries despite its central themes.

A 2023 study by the Universidad Distrital Francisco José de Caldas interprets Delta Force 2: The Colombian Connection through the concept of U.S. soft power, arguing that its portrayal of San Carlos, Ramón Cota, the DEA and the country's political institutions constructs a hierarchy in which American power is positioned above the sovereignty and institutions of the fictional country.

Taken together, these scholars' analyses interpret the film as reinforcing stereotypes concerning Colombia and narcotrafficking while presenting U.S. intervention as a source of order and authority.

== Soundtrack ==
The film's musical score was composed by French composer Frédéric Talgorn and performed by the Orchestre Symphonique d'Europe. In addition, the soundtrack features the song Winds of Change, written by Talgorn and Harriet Schock and performed by Lee Greenwood.

A soundtrack album was released by the German label Alhambra Records in 1993. The album was later included as the second disc of a two-CD expanded soundtrack released by Intrada Records, which presented 76 minutes of previously unreleased material.

== See also ==
- Chuck Norris filmography
- List of American films of 1990

== Bibliography ==
- Norris, Chuck; Abraham, Ken (2004). Against All Odds: My Story. Nashville, Tennessee: Broadman & Holman Publishers. ISBN 0805431616.
- Trunick, Austin (2022). The Cannon Film Guide Volume II (1985–1987). BearManor Media. ISBN 978-1-62933-888-0.
