= Michael Preece =

American director, producer and actor (1936–2025)

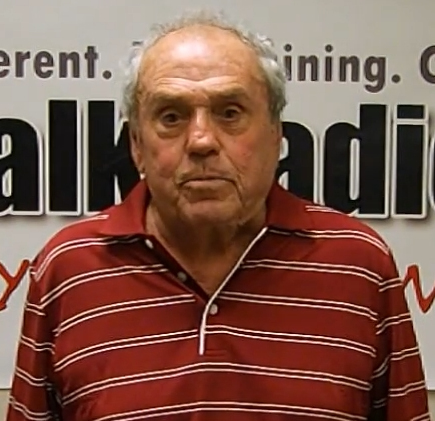
- Preece in 2015
- Born: Michael Conway Preece; September 15, 1936; Los Angeles, California, U.S.
- Died: February 27, 2025 (aged 88); Los Angeles, California, U.S.
- Resting place: Inglewood Park Cemetery
- Occupations: Film and television director, script supervisor, producer, actor
- Years active: 1955-2007

Michael Conway Preece (September 15, 1936 – February 27, 2025) was an American film and television director, script supervisor, producer, and actor best known for directing the television series Dallas and Walker, Texas Ranger and the films The Prize Fighter and Logan's War: Bound by Honor.

== Early life ==
Preece was born in Los Angeles, California, and graduated from Alexander Hamilton High School. His father was a salesman for a cigarette and cigar company, and his mother, Thelma Preece, was the first female business agent in Hollywood and founder of the Script Clerks Guild which later became the Script Supervisor Local 871 IATSE.

== Career ==
While a freshman student at Santa Monica City College in the summer of 1955 in the early days of television Preece took on a job as a script supervisor. He worked as a script supervisor on such TV series as Mr. Novak, I Spy, and Hawaii Five-O and a score of such feature films as The Great Locomotive Chase (1956), The Spirit of St. Louis (1957), The Old Man and the Sea (1958), Cimarron (1962), Mutiny on the Bounty (1962), How the West Was Won (1962), Morituri (1965), Will Penny (1968), True Grit (1969), The Hawaiians (1970), The Getaway (1972), The Paper Chase (1973), and Breakheart Pass (1975). Starting in 1975 Preece directed over 300 episodes of TV series, including Dallas where he set a record for most one-hour episodes directed and filmed each cast member firing a gun in order to ensure that no one knew who shot J.R. He also directed episodes of Walker, Texas Ranger, The Streets of San Francisco, Knots Landing, 7th Heaven, Falcon Crest, Barnaby Jones, The Bionic Woman, T.J. Hooker, MacGyver, When the Whistle Blows, Baywatch, Hunter, Fantasy Island, The Incredible Hulk, Trapper John, M.D., Stingray, B. J. and the Bear, Ace Crawford, Private Eye, Mike Hammer (1984 TV Series), Jake and the Fatman, The Young Riders, Flamingo Road, and Renegade.

Preece also directed such films as The Prize Fighter (1979), one of the most financially successful films ever released by New World Pictures, Great Day (1983), Beretta's Island (1994), Walker Texas Ranger 3: Deadly Reunion (1994), Logan's War: Bound by Honor (1998) (for which he won a Lone Star Film & Television Award for Best TV Director), Dallas: War of the Ewings (1998), and The President's Man (2000).

== Personal life and death ==
Preece met his first wife Paula at high school, and they were married from 1953 until their 1968 divorce. They had four children. His daughter Gretchen is married to singer-songwriter Randy Newman. He was then married to Hollywood hairstylist Evelyn Preece (née Thomas; 1942–2017) from 1969 until her death. He spoke at Women in Film breakfast meetings.

Preece died of heart failure at his Brentwood home in Los Angeles on February 27, 2025, at the age of 88. He was interred at Inglewood Park Cemetery.
