= The President's Man: A Line in the Sand =

2002 television action film by Eric Norris

- Official DVD cover
- Written by: John Lansing; Bruce Cervi
- Directed by: Eric Norris
- Starring: Chuck Norris; Judson Mills; Jennifer Tung; Joel Swetow; Ali Afshar
- Music by: Kevin Kiner
- Country of origin: United States
- Original language: English

Production
- Executive producers: Aaron Norris; Chuck Norris; Garry A. Brown
- Producer: Mike Elias
- Cinematography: Rick Anderson
- Editor: David Latham
- Running time: 90 minutes
- Production company: Norris Brothers Entertainment

Original release
- Network: CBS
- Release: January 20, 2002

Related
- The President's Man (2000)

The President's Man: A Line in the Sand is a 2002 American made-for-television action film starring Chuck Norris and Judson Mills. It is a sequel to The President's Man and is the second installment in The President's Man film series. It was first shown on CBS on January 20, 2002. The film was directed by Norris' son Eric Norris and co-produced by his brother Aaron Norris.

== Plot ==
Secret agent Joshua McCord (Chuck Norris) is assigned by President Adam Mayfield (Robert Urich) to prevent a band of terrorists from setting off a nuclear device in a U.S. city. McCord has to infiltrate the terrorists' headquarters and disarm the bomb. Deke Slater (Judson Mills), McCord's younger assistant, develops a relationship with McCord's daughter Que (Jennifer Tung).

== Cast ==
- Chuck Norris as Agent Joshua McCord
- Judson Mills as Deke Slater
- Jennifer Tung as Que McCord
- Roxanne Hart as Lydia Mayfield
- Joel Swetow as Fadhal Rashid
- Ali Afshar as Abir Rashid
- Thom Barry as Gen. Warren Gates
- Bruce Nozick as Phillip Kaznar
- Maz Jobrani as Ali Faisal
- Kay Bailey Hutchison as Herself
- Philip Casnoff as Jack Stanton
- Robert Urich as President Adam Mayfield
- Chino Binamo as Guard #1
- Dameon Clarke as Andy Shelby
- Dan Flannery as CIA Director Carter McLain
- Jeff Grays as T.C.
- Sean Hennigan as Dr. Arthur Everett
- James Huston as Spencer Ryan
- Maggie Parks as Barbara
- Bill Poague as Producer
- Tom Powell as Dr. Rolf Kellner
- Brett Rice as FBI Director Stephen Mornay
- Jordan Wall as Rob Daniels
- Jack Watkins as Dan Felder
- Harout Yerganian as Rashid's Aide

== See also ==
- List of American films of 2002
- Chuck Norris filmography
