= Lone Wolf McQuade =

1983 film

- Theatrical release poster by C.W. Taylor
- Directed by: Steve Carver
- Screenplay by: B. J. Nelson
- Story by: H. Kaye Dyal; B. J. Nelson
- Produced by: Yoram Ben-Ami; Steve Carver
- Starring: Chuck Norris; David Carradine; Barbara Carrera; Leon Isaac Kennedy; L. Q. Jones
- Cinematography: Roger Shearman
- Edited by: Anthony Redman
- Music by: Francesco De Masi
- Production company: El Paso
- Distributed by: Orion Pictures
- Release date: April 15, 1983
- Running time: 108 minutes
- Country: United States
- Language: English
- Budget: $5 million
- Box office: $12,232,628 (United States) or $15 million

Lone Wolf McQuade is a 1983 American neo-western action film directed by Steve Carver and starring Chuck Norris, David Carradine, Barbara Carrera, L.Q. Jones, R.G. Armstrong, Leon Isaac Kennedy and Robert Beltran.

== Plot ==
Texas Ranger Jim "J.J." McQuade, a former Marine, prefers to work alone, packing a large .44 Magnum revolver as his duty sidearm. He lives in a dilapidated house in the middle of nowhere in solitude, except for his pet wolf.

From the clifftops, McQuade observes Mexican bandits herding stolen horses, and notes the poor placement of fellow law enforcement officers by placing rocks in the sand to mark positions. When the gun battle ensues, McQuade saves several Texas State Troopers, emerging unscathed.

In El Paso, Texas McQuade attends the retirement ceremony for his close friend and fellow Ranger Dakota Brown. McQuade's C.O., Ranger Captain T. Tyler, attempts to curb his "lone wolf" behavior, by insisting he partner with TST Arcadio "Kayo" Ramos, a tough but clean-cut Latino.

Divorced but amicable with his ex-wife Molly, McQuade loves his teenage daughter Sally, and doesn't object to her new US Army boyfriend Bobby, who respects McQuade's service. While riding, Sally's mustang bolts from back-fire, running wild. Sally is saved by Lola Richardson, who invites them to a party. Rawley Wilkes exhibits his martial arts prowess. When McQuade won't fight, Wilkes sends thugs to fight Ramos, forcing McQuade's intervention. Afterwards, Lola entices Jim, and they leave for a romantic interlude. The next day, Jim is annoyed at Lola for cleaning his house, but he relents.

Sally and Bobby witness a U.S. Army convoy heist. Bobby is killed, and Sally hospitalized after her car is rammed down a ravine. McQuade submits to partnering with Kayo to hunt the perpetrators. Kayo's computer skills reveal exactly what weapons the convoy contained. At a garment factory, they arrest career criminal Snow, who won't talk until Dakota fires a Mac-10 in his direction.

While McQuade is away interrogating Emilio Falcon, Wilkes kills Snow for squealing, and Dakota as a witness, alerting the FBI. Captain Tyler suspends McQuade for Dakota's death, but FBI Special Agent Marcus Jackson wants to help McQuade and Ramos against the gunrunners. The trail leads them to Wilkes, an arms dealer selling to terrorists and Central American militants.

They scout a secret airstrip in the desert, returning in force, but ATF Agents Burnside and Núñez are killed. Wilkes, expecting them, captures McQuade, sadistically beats him, then buries him inside his '83 Dodge Ramcharger. Wilkes escapes in his plane, and Kayo fires at remaining ground crew. McQuade regains consciousness, activates his homemade supercharger, and breaks free from the dirt to rescue Ramos and Jackson.

Meanwhile, Wilkes abducts Sally to Mexico. Falcon, who launders arms proceeds through his pinball business, tells McQuade that Wilkes double-crossed him. In exchange for revealing Wilkes' location, Falcon wants McQuade to look the other way so Falcon can recover his weapons.

"Lone Wolf" McQuade tries to rescue Sally himself, but both Ramos and Jackson follow to help attack Wilkes' base. During the intense battle, Jackson is shot again. Lola and Sally try escaping, but Sally is shot in the leg. McQuade and Wilkes engage a hand-to-hand combat, in Wilkes' favor until he strikes Sally, provoking McQuade into a frenzy of hits and kicks that defeats Wilkes. McQuade and Sally are reunited, but an injured Wilkes opens fire. Lola steps into the line of fire to save McQuade and is fatally wounded. Lola's dying words reveal that Wilkes murdered her husband and forced her to be his partner, but she loves McQuade.

Wilkes and his henchman escape into a building for cover. Jackson hands a grenade to McQuade, who throws it, killing Wilkes. Falcon arrives in his helicopter to recover his merchandise, which is now destroyed. McQuade, Sally, Ramos, and Jackson fly away in the helicopter, leaving Falcon to Mexican Federales justice.

McQuade and Jackson respond to press asking if "the FBI credits the Texas Rangers with the rescue," and Capt. Tyler tries to take credit for having "taught him all he knows." McQuade helps Molly and Sally move, but Ramos arrives asking for help against gunman robbing a bank. On vacation, McQuade declines, but Ramos objects, "They've got hostages!" McQuade hesitates, "Hostages? ...Let's go!" As the squad car speeds off, Molly yells, "J.J. McQuade, you'll never change!"

== Cast ==
- Chuck Norris as Ranger Jim "J.J." McQuade
- David Carradine as Rawley Wilkes
- Barbara Carrera as Lola Richardson
- Robert Beltran as Deputy Arcadio "Kayo" Ramos
- Leon Isaac Kennedy as FBI Agent Marcus Jackson
- John Anderson as ATF Agent Burnside
- L.Q. Jones as Ranger Dakota Brown
- Dana Kimmell as Sally McQuade
- R.G. Armstrong as Captain T. Tyler
- Tommy Ballard as Colonel Remsing
- Oscar Hidalgo as Deputy Oscar Garcia
- Jorge Cervera Jr. as "Jefe"
- Sharon Farrell as Molly McQuade
- Anthony Caglia as Intern
- Robert Jordan as Bobby Drew
- Daniel Frishman as Emilio Falcon
- Hector Serrano as Cuban
- William Sanderson as "Snow"
- Aaron Norris as Punk
- Kane Hodder as Goon (uncredited)
- David Lee Smith as Pilot

== Production ==
=== Development ===
Director Steve Carver had previously worked with Chuck Norris on the film A Eye for an Eye.

BJ Nelson wrote the script. It was originally called Lone Wolf. He wrote all drafts and was not rewritten. Kaye Dyal only assisted with story ideas late in the process anda John Milius suggested a few details. Nelson wanted Clint Eastwood to play the role but after he passed, Carver thought Chuck Norris would be ideal to play the lead so he approached him to do the film.

Carver wanted to "mess up" Chuck Norris' image, having him grow a beard and drink beer on screen. Norris was reluctant as he wanted to be a good role model for children.

Carver and Nelson were fans of director Sergio Leone and made the film in the style of Leone.

=== Filming ===
Chuck Norris and David Carradine refused to use stunt doubles for their climactic fight scene, despite strong reservations from the producers. "The thing about the fight with Dave is that not only is it very well done, but it and the other martial-arts scenes are not just fillers," said Norris. "You've got to have more than technique if you're going to capture the emotions of the audience."

Carradine said Norris wanted to do a fight that matched the one Norris did with Bruce Lee in the Roman Coliseum in Way of the Dragon "and we were actually trying to go beyond that. I think we did. I think photographically we didn't. But as far as the fight was concerned, the combination of the two styles, you know, because I was very flowing and loose, and he was very solid and hard, I think we accomplished what we set out to do."

Carradine said the fight was shot over four days and "we were little old men by the end of it. All our old injuries came back, we got new injuries, and we were stumbling around like little old men."

In an interview in 2020, Steve Carver said Chuck Norris was "easy to work with". He added that athletes "think differently than trained theatre actors. If you block a scene with an athlete, if you ask an athlete to move from point A to B, or to pick up something, or do anything, he will do these movements mechanically. Which is not a bad thing, because with every rehearsal the movement becomes more fluid. Whereas a theatre actor will project their movements and their dialogue. It's a stage to them. That's the difference. Chuck was a little bit stiff in An Eye For An Eye. He became looser in Lone Wolf McQuade. After that he became better with every picture he did."

== Release ==
=== Rating ===
The film was originally rated "R" but Chuck Norris appealed the decision to the MPAA and succeeded in getting the film rated PG.

"This is the second time I've appealed," said Norris. "They gave Good Guys Wear Black an R, but I persuaded them to make it a PG. My argument was the strong, positive image I project on the screen. The word karate, unfortunately, connotes violence to many people. Actually, it's a means of avoiding violent situations, and a form of defense if you have no choice and you're backed into a corner.... My films are very similar to the John Wayne movies of the '40s. He'd go in a bar and Jack Palance would pick a fight with him, and then Wayne would take out half the saloon. It's the same theme: A man is pushed into a situation where he has to resort to violence."

== Reception ==
=== Box office ===
Lone Wolf McQuade grossed $12 million in the United States.

=== Critical response ===
Roger Ebert rated the film three-and-a-half stars out of four and compared Norris and his character favorably to the roles Clint Eastwood used to play in spaghetti Westerns.

Vincent Canby of The New York Times called Norris "good" and further noted: "The plot, set in and around El Paso, is unimportant and nonstop, like an old-fashioned, Saturday afternoon serial, which isn't at all bad. Steve Carver, the director, understands that in such films action is content."

Todd McCarthy of Variety wrote, "Fans of Soldier of Fortune magazine will think they've been ambushed and blown away to heaven by 'Lone Wolf McQuade.' Every conceivable type of portable weapon on the world market today is tried out by the macho warriors on both sides of the law in this modern western, which pits Texas Ranger Chuck Norris and his cohorts against multifarious baddies who like to play rough."

In his Hollywood Reporter review, Duane Byrge calls Lone Wolf McQuade a “white hat vs. black hat” showdown that builds to a memorable karate-versus-kung fu duel between Chuck Norris and David Carradine. Mixing the grit of anti-establishment cop thrillers with the sweep of classic Westerns, Byrge praises Roger Shearman’s expansive El Paso cinematography and Steve Carver’s tight, vigorous direction. In his view, the film is a visually driven, unabashedly action-oriented ride whose flat dialogue is outweighed by its “slam-bang” pacing and spectacle.

Gene Siskel of the Chicago Tribune gave the film two-and-a-half stars out of four and wrote, "The rhythm here is seven minutes of action, followed by a minute of dialogue, followed by another seven minutes of action. For a while I was laughing at all of the explosions; eventually, though, all of the noise became annoying."

Kevin Thomas of the Los Angeles Times thought that the film, "like its predecessor, 'Forced Vengeance,' becomes so numbingly violent that it's a turnoff about a third of the way through."

Jimmy Summers wrote in BoxOffice magazine, "Chuck Norris still doesn't have the screen presence to achieve his often-repeated wish of becoming the next John Wayne, but as long as he keeps his feet and fists flying and stays relatively quiet he's an effective action hero. In the wildly exaggerated world of this movie, he's almost a super-hero."

As of July 2024 the film has a score of 57% on review aggregator Rotten Tomatoes based on 7 reviews.

=== Legacy ===
Norris later said the film "broke the kung fu mode" for him and helped turn him into a more mainstream action star.

Norris credits this film as a leading inspiration for his hit television series, Walker, Texas Ranger, which premiered a decade later. Yet the pilot had to be rewritten, and the characters' names changed, since "all things McQuade" were copyrighted by Orion Pictures. The original co-producer of the series was The Cannon Group, which like Orion is now absorbed into Metro-Goldwyn-Mayer (though the Cannon films are distributed on television by another company).

Steve Carver and his production partner Yoram Ben-Ami sued the producers of Walker, Texas Rangers for 500 million dollars. Carver talked about the lawsuit in an interview in 2020: "MGM and CBS had bigger and better and more lawyers than we did, all the way to the Supreme Court. We failed to convince the Supreme Court that there were similarities. Now, you and I and anybody else knows that there are similarities between Lone Wolf McQuade and Walker Texas Ranger." He added that the lawsuit was the reason Chuck Norris and he parted ways.

== See also ==
- List of American films of 1983
- Chuck Norris filmography
