= Roland Harrah III =

American actor

- Born: Roland Edward Harrah; January 20, 1973; Denver, Colorado
- Died: January 3, 1995 (aged 21); Riverside, California
- Occupations: Actor, musician
- Years active: 1984–1990

Roland Edward Harrah (January 20, 1973 – January 3, 1995) was an American film and television child actor, actor, songwriter, musician, singer, and artist.

== Biography ==
Harrah co-starred in adventure dramas, particularly related to Vietnam, which included Braddock: Missing in Action III (1988) with Chuck Norris and in two episodes of the television series Airwolf (1984–1987) with Jan-Michael Vincent.

Born in Denver, Colorado, Harrah moved and lived in Riverside, California for 15 years and acted for 12 years. He died by suicide at his home in Riverside and was interred at Crestlawn Memorial Park, Riverside, California.

== Filmography ==
Film
Year	Title	Role	Notes
1986	Kung Fu: The Movie	Old One's Grandson	
1988	Braddock: Missing in Action III	Van Tan Cang	
1990	Shadow of China	Xiao Niu	aka China Shadow., (final film role)
Television
Year	Title	Role	Notes
1984	Magnum, P.I.	Tran Quoc Jones	1 episode: "Tran Quoc Jones"
1985–1986	Airwolf	Le Van Hawke, age 12; "Half-Pint"	2 episodes: "Half-Pint" 1985, "Birds of Paradise" 1986
1986	Scarecrow and Mrs. King	Khai's Kid "Roland Harrah"	1 episode: "The Man Who Died Twice"

== Awards and nominations ==
Year	Award	Result	Category	Film or series
1987	Young Artist Award	Nominated	Exceptional Performance by a Young Actor, Guest Starring in a Television, Comedy or Drama Series	Airwolf
1989	Young Artist Award	Nominated	Best Young Actor Starring in a Motion Picture – Drama	Braddock: Missing in Action III

== Memberships and affiliations ==
Type	Organization
Member	American Federation of Television and Radio Artists (AFTRA)
Member	Screen Actors Guild (SAG)
