= The Hitman =

1991 film by Aaron Norris

- Theatrical release poster
- Directed by: Aaron Norris
- Written by: Don Carmody; Robert Geoffrion; Galen Thompson
- Produced by: Don Carmody
- Starring: Chuck Norris; Michael Parks; Alberta Watson; Al Waxman
- Cinematography: João Fernandes
- Edited by: Jacqueline Carmody
- Music by: Joel Derouin
- Distributed by: Cannon Pictures
- Release date: October 25, 1991
- Running time: 95 minutes
- Country: United States
- Language: English
- Box office: $4.6 million

The Hitman is a 1991 Canadian-American action film starring Chuck Norris. It was directed by Aaron Norris and written by Don Carmody, Robert Geoffrion and Galen Thompson. despite mixed reviews from critics, the film was a box office success.

== Plot ==
Seattle cop Cliff Garret is severely wounded in a drug bust gone bad—shot by his corrupt partner Ronny "Del" Delany.

Garret dies momentarily in the emergency room, but is revived with a defibrillator. His police supervisor, Chambers, has the hospital conceal his survival, and Garret is given a new identity. Garret becomes hitman Danny Grogan, and 3 years later he infiltrates the organization of mob boss mafioso Marco Luganni.

The plan is for Grogan to bring together Luganni and his rival, French Canadian mafioso boss André LaCombe, so they can both be taken down together. After two years of working the plan, a gang of Iranian drug dealers looking to muscle in on everyone's territories suddenly enter the picture when they make a hit on one of Luganni's teams just as they finished making a hit on a team of LaCombe's money carriers.

Grogan plays all parties against one another while befriending a fatherless boy named Tim Murphy, who lives in the apartment down the hall and is being bullied by a neighborhood bully. Tim's mother works three jobs, so he begins spending time with Grogan. Grogan teaches Tim how to fight after seeing him bullied on the street one day. When Tim stands up to the bully, he gets the best of him, then watches as the bully is dragged off by his father and beaten for losing the fight. Grogan walks across the street, punches the father in the nose through a screen door, so hard that it knocks the father to the ground, then Grogan walks away.

Grogan's past returns to haunt him when he sees Ronny Delany, who is secretly working with Luganni. Delany recognizes Grogan as Garret, and ties Tim to a chair loaded with explosives in a bid to force Grogan to cooperate. Delany sets off the chair bomb, but Grogan is unharmed and Tim survives.

Grogan turns the tables on them all. At a meeting to set terms of an alliance, Delany has Luganni's men kill LaCombe and his men. Then the Iranians and Delany kill Luganni, but Grogan arrives on the scene and kills all of them. Grogan leaves an enormous sum of money for Tim and his mother in Tim's hospital room. Tim's mother discovers it and is very grateful. In the end, in retribution for what he did to Tim, Grogan blows Delany up while tied to a chair hanging outside a window, much to the chagrin of Chambers.

== Cast ==
- Chuck Norris as Detective Cliff Garret / Danny Grogan
- Michael Parks as Detective Ronny "Del" Delaney
- Al Waxman as Marco Luganni
- Alberta Watson as Christine De Vera
- Salim Grant as Tim Murphy
- Ken Pogue as Captain Chambers
- Marcel Sabourin as Andre Lacombe
- Bruno Gerussi as Nino Scarlini
- Frank Ferrucci as Shahad
- James Purcell as Sal
- Candus Churchill as Kate Murphy
- Alan C. Peterson as Mr. Lemke
- Paris Mileos as Tony Scolari
- Alex Bruhanski as Stansey Scarlini
- Stephen Dimopoulos as Joe Galione
- Anthony Stamboulieh as Rigoletti
- Michael Benyaer as Hassan
- Gerry Bean as Fierro
- Nathan Vanering as Simon Nantel
- Alex Diakun as Armone
- Michele Goodger as Corrine Lacombe
- Michael Rogers as Sully
- Jon Cuthbert as Joe
- Rebecca Norris as Waitress (#)
- William B. Davis as Dr. Atkins
- Henry Holmes as Chief Surgeon
- Fred Henderson as E.R. Doctor
- Sylvain Demers as Attendant
- Suleka Mathew as Attendant
- Beau Heaton as Bo Lemke
- Amanda Norris as Lacombe's Twin Daughter #1 (#)
- Meagan Norris as Lacombe's Twin Daughter #2 (#)
(#) NOTE: Amanda and Meagan are director Aaron's real-life offspring; Rebecca is the girls' mother and the director's wife.

== Production ==
Norris was originally in talks to star in Fifty/Fifty for director Charles Martin Smith before committing to this picture instead.

== Reception ==
=== Box office ===
The film was a box-office success.

=== Critical response ===
The film received mixed reviews from critics. Movie historian Leonard Maltin called the picture "Fairly awful...Although Norris gets to play a heavy for the first time in over a decade, this "stretch" still isn't enough to distinguish the movie from Chuck's other recent cinematic misses—especially since we know all along it's a ruse. Stuntwork remains the film's only redemption."

On Rotten Tomatoes the film has a score of 13% based on 8 reviews.

== See also ==
- List of American films of 1991
- Chuck Norris filmography
