= Logan's War: Bound by Honor =

- DVD cover
- Written by: Walter Klenhard
- Story by: Chuck Norris; Aaron Norris; Walter Klenhard
- Directed by: Michael Preece
- Starring: Eddie Cibrian; Chuck Norris; Joe Spano
- Music by: Christopher L. Stone
- Country of origin: United States
- Original language: English

Production
- Executive producers: Chuck Norris; Aaron Norris
- Producer: Garry A. Brown
- Cinematography: Karl Kases
- Running time: 95 minutes
- Production company: Norris Brothers Entertainment

Original release
- Network: CBS
- Release: November 1, 1998

Logan's War: Bound by Honor is a 1998 American made-for-television action film directed by Michael Preece. It was written by Walter Klenhard, based on a story he wrote with Chuck Norris and his brother Aaron. Chuck Norris also starred in the film, with Eddie Cibrian and Joe Spano. The film premiered on November 1, 1998, on CBS.

== Plot ==
In 1983, ten-year-old Logan Fallon witnesses the murders of his family (younger sister Jessica; their parents Nicholas and Terry) - along with five police officers - by Mafia thugs. Following said tragedy, Logan grows up on a Taos, New Mexico ranch owned by Jake Fallon (a former Army Ranger and recipient of the Distinguished Service Cross) and Ben, the boy's paternal uncle and maternal grandfather, respectively.

Ultimately, Ben and Jake discover that Logan has been blessed with "proximity sense": the ability to perceive danger before it happens. Said gift previously saved Logan's life from the mobsters who slaughtered Jessica and their parents; sadly, his warnings were dismissed as youthful gibberish.

In 1991, Logan follows in Jake's footsteps by joining the Army and becoming a Ranger. He learns martial arts and survival skills, becoming a tough and lethal fighting machine. Seven years later, he has achieved the rank of Staff Sergeant - and earned a Distinguished Service Cross of his own, by rescuing a downed U.S. Air Force Captain in Guatemala.

Logan returns to Jake's ranch, where they plan for Logan to resign from the Army so he can avenge the murders of their loved ones. Logan is torn between obeying the laws of the land or living by his own rules. Traveling to Chicago, he visits his family's graves and discovers that Nick's best friend - now his executor - has invested wisely over the past 15 years, thus becoming very wealthy.

Logan moves into a hotel to plan his revenge; while living there, he has to deal with a woman and her son living with her abusive husband, and they soon form a bond. He gives them money to leave and when the husband returns after he went to go get beer, he finds Logan sitting on the couch and the latter teaches him a lesson by beating him up.

Using the name "Jimmy Testa", Logan infiltrates the underworld clan responsible for his family's death. Under the wing of Sal Mercado, Jimmy works his way up the Mafia ladder. Meanwhile, FBI Agent John Downing - who himself has been pursuing the Fallon killers for over a decade - reviews the old case files after Logan contacts him anonymously. Jimmy has been contracted to assassinate Joseph Landers, a local judge; acting on Logan's tip, Downing arranges for the judge's death to be faked. For carrying out said hit, Jimmy is slated to become a "made man". But at his ceremony, Logan reveals his true identity to all those gathered and proceeds to finish what the mob started 15 years ago, with an assist from his uncle Jake.

== Cast ==
- Chuck Norris as Ranger Jake Fallon
- Eddie Cibrian as Logan Fallon
- Joe Spano as FBI Special Agent John Downing
- Jeff Kober as Sal Mercado
- R. D. Call as Albert Talgorno
- Brendon Ryan Barrett as Logan Fallon (age 10)
- James Gammon as Ben
- Vinnie Curto as Johnny
- Devon Michael as Jesse Ridgeway
- Greg Kean as Chicky Bruno
- Antoni Corone as Mike Faffino
- Beth Barrett as Reporter # 1
- Rodger Boyce as Judge Joseph Landers
- Vince Cecere as Vinnie Keys
- Julio Cedillo as Ranger # 1
- Ariel Chipman as Jessica Fallon
- Patrick Clear as John Renner
- Ken Farmer as Major Carlson
- Gil Glasgow as Manager
- Gavin Glennon as TV Reporter
- Grayson Helms as Pilot
- Paul Kirby as Doctor
- Colette O' Connell as Terry Fallon
- Stephanie Rogers as Janine Taylor
- Todd Terry as Captain Mackey
- Morgana Shaw as Helen Ridgeway
- Matthew Tompkins as Nicholas Fallon
- Oliver Tull as Officer Brenbo
- Jake Walker as Ed Ridgeway
- Catherine Whitman as Reporter # 2

== Release ==
=== Television ===
The television film premiered on CBS on November 1, 1998, following a new episode of the Norris TV series Walker, Texas Ranger.

== Reception ==
New York magazine wrote: "Aside from a hokey nod to the paranormal [...] about all that distinguishes Bound by Honor from routine chopsocky is a better-than-usual cast [...].

=== Rating ===
The television-film was ranked third among the thirteen most viewed shows of that week.

=== Accolades ===
At the Lone Star Film & Television Award, director Michael Preece won Best TV Director.

Brendon Ryan Barrett was nominated for Best Performance in a TV Movie/Pilot/Mini-Series or Series - Leading Young Actor at the Young Artist Awards.

== See also ==
- List of American films of 1998
- Chuck Norris filmography
