= Braddock: Missing in Action III =

1988 film directed by Aaron Norris

- Theatrical release poster
- Directed by: Aaron Norris
- Written by: James Bruner; Chuck Norris
- Based on: Characters by Arthur Silver; Larry Levinson & Steve Bing
- Produced by: Menahem Golan; Yoram Globus
- Starring: Chuck Norris; Aki Aleong; Yehuda Efroni; Roland Harrah III
- Cinematography: João Fernandes
- Edited by: Michael J. Duthie
- Music by: Jay Chattaway
- Distributed by: Cannon Films
- Release date: January 22, 1988
- Running time: 103 minutes
- Country: United States
- Language: English
- Budget: $9 million
- Box office: $7,193,901 (U.S.A.)

Braddock: Missing in Action III is a 1988 American action adventure film, a sequel to Missing in Action (1984) and the third and final installment in the Missing in Action film series. The film stars Chuck Norris, who co-wrote the screenplay with James Bruner. The film was directed by Norris' brother, Aaron Norris.

The film is about Colonel James Braddock who learns from a missionary that his wife Lin, long presumed dead, is alive and that he has a 12-year-old son. Suspicious of a CIA official’s attempt to dismiss the claim, Braddock returns to Vietnam to investigate.

Cannon Films, facing financial trouble, pushed for another Missing in Action movie, but Chuck Norris initially refused. His interest was revived when his brother Aaron told him about the thousands of Amerasian children left behind in Vietnam, inspiring Norris to research the issue and get emotionally invested in telling their story. Prior to Aaron Norris making his directorial debut with the film, several directors were attached. Production took place in the Philippines, where a tragic helicopter crash claimed the lives of four military and police officers. Despite the setbacks, Norris believed before its release that Braddock: Missing in Action III was the best film he had made.

Braddock: Missing in Action III opened at number five at the U.S. box office, earning $2.2 million in its first weekend. Despite Chuck Norris’s belief that it was the strongest entry in the series, it became the least successful financially. Norris later expressed frustration with Cannon Films’ marketing efforts, claiming they mishandled the release and jeopardized his career.

The film was met with mostly negative reviews, criticized for its formulaic action, excessive violence, and lack of emotional depth. Many viewed it as a routine entry in Chuck Norris’s filmography, offering little beyond familiar one-man-army tropes. Some noted faint attempts at emotional storytelling, but overall, it was seen as predictable and heavy-handed rather than impactful or engaging.

== Plot ==
The film opens with scenes of the fall of Saigon (1975). Colonel James Braddock, Vietnam War veteran, had believed his Asian wife Lin Tan Cang to be dead since the war ended in 1975, but he hears from a missionary, Reverend Polanski, that Lin is not only alive, but that she and Braddock have a 12-year-old son named Van Tan Cang.

At first, Braddock does not believe it, but when cold-blooded CIA boss Littlejohn tells Braddock to disregard that information, that is when Braddock knows it is true. Braddock heads back into Vietnam through parachute deployment and with the help of an Australian C-47 pilot. After parachute descent, Braddock outruns Vietnamese Navy patrol boats with a jet-powered speedboat.

Reverend Polanski leads Braddock to Lin and Van. Attempting to flee the country, Braddock, Lin and Van are captured by the soldiers of the sadistic Vietnamese General Quoc. Quoc kills Lin on the spot, and has his soldiers take Braddock and Van to a compound to be tortured.

Later, Braddock overpowers his guards, frees Van, and heads for the mission that is run by Polanski. Quoc anticipates the move and takes all the mission children into captivity, along with Van and Polanski, and Braddock sets out to free them all from Quoc by going to his weapons cache that he had hidden a few days prior. He equips himself with a modified Heckler & Koch G3 battle rifle with an underslung 6-shot rotary grenade launcher and attachments including a spring-loaded bayonet. He raids the camp, killing the guards and loading up one of the trucks with all the children including his son Van and the Reverend. Soon after escaping, they are followed and attacked by a Vietnamese-captured US UH-1 Huey.

After they escape, Braddock takes the children on foot to find a Vietnamese airstrip. Braddock silently takes out the guards and hijacks a C-47 Dakota plane. The plane is then attacked by Vietnamese guards, causing fuel to leak out of the plane, eventually crashing just outside the Cambodian-Thailand border. Braddock then raids the border station where Thai and US troops are watching on the other side, cheering Braddock on. When Braddock kills all the opposing troops, more pour in. Braddock is injured by a grenade. When General Quoc then flies in on a Vietnamese Mil-24 Hind gunship thinking he has Braddock all to himself, two US helicopters on the side of the Thai border confront Quoc's gunship. Taunting each other to cross, Braddock and his son Van fire at Quoc's ship, hitting the pilot. The gunship crashes, killing Quoc. The US troops pour over the border and bridge and help the wounded Braddock and the children.

== Cast ==
- Chuck Norris as Colonel James Thomas Braddock
- Aki Aleong as General Quoc
- Roland Harrah III as Van Tan Cang
- Yehuda Efroni as Reverend Polanski
- Floyd Levine as General Duncan
- Miki Kim as Lin Tan Cang
- Ron Barker as "Mik" Mikalchek
- Jack Rader as CIA Agent Littlejohn
- Keith David as Embassy Gate Captain

== Production ==
=== Development ===
Norris had a long-term deal with Cannon Films. They were in financial trouble and wanted a new Missing in Action film.

On the development of the film, Norris said "When Cannon asked me about doing a trilogy of 'MIA,' I replied, 'What else can I do?' I really wasn't interested in doing a third one. Then my brother, Aaron, said, 'Have you been reading about the Amerasian children?' He started telling me that in Vietnam there are 15,000 Amerasian children who are trapped there, considered outcasts, living a strictly non- existent life. So I started reading up on the subject and got emotionally involved. James Bruner and I began writing this story about an officer in the Vietnam War whose wife was presumed killed when their home was blown up during the fall of Saigon. The officer is wounded and shipped out. Twelve years later, he learns that his wife is still alive and he has a 12 year old son. The rest of the movie concerns his efforts to them out of the get country."

Norris was particularly affected by a segment he saw on the ABC TV show 20/20: "An American soldier fell in love over there in Vietnam, but the Army wouldn't let him marry her. He went back and tried to get her over because he knew she was pregnant. Finally, she had the baby over there and died. So the next 14 years he spent trying to locate (the child) and get him out of the country. But finally he did it, and there were tears and everything then. It really hit you".

=== Filming ===
Filming was to start 1 December 1986 with Joseph Zito who directed the original film to direct, but due to creative and personal differences with Chuck Norris, Zito left the production. In March, Jack Smight was attached to direct. Eventually Aaron Norris wound up making his directorial debut on the film. Norris later said that Aaron saved Braddock after going through several other directors.

On May 30, 1987, four military and police officers were killed in an AUH-76 helicopter of the Philippine Air Force accident during filming in the Philippines.

Norris thought that it was the best film he ever made prior to its release.

== Reception ==
=== Box office ===
Norris said that Missing in Action and Missing in Action 2: The Beginning put Cannon on the New York Stock Exchange, as Cannon Films was in the state of bankruptcy.

The movie debuted at No. 5 at the box office with $2,210,401 in the opening weekend. It was the least financially successful film in the Missing in Action film series.

Norris said he was "frustrated", with the job Cannon Films did with marketing the film: "I was ready to break my contract because it was the best of the series. We had a big meeting, and I told them that if they didn't do a better job marketing my films in the U.S., I was going to take them to court because my career is on the line".

=== Critical response ===
Walter Goodman of The New York Times wrote: "Wearing a worried expression beneath a week's worth of beard, Braddock knocks off what remains of the Vietnamese Army, already pretty well decimated by their earlier encounters ... As that general remarks before he meets the fate of all of Braddock's adversaries, 'This has gone on long enough'". Variety said: "Chuck Norris manages to pull off a strangely timely and involving story about getting a bunch of Amerasian kids out of Vietnam within the confines of his usual 1-man army action meller parameters. Not to say this is emotional stuff, just up a notch from past chapters that have managed to attract mostly a redneck following at the b.o." Dave Kehr of the Chicago Tribune gave the film 2 stars out of 4 and wrote: "It's a passable action film, though like most of Norris' vehicles, it's an almost completely colorless one". Leonard Klady of the Los Angeles Times called the film "a by-the-numbers filmed atrocity. One can just imagine a game caller saying: 'Under the 'I', 17 Amerasian children tortured; under the 'N', 49 Vietnamese soldiers blown to kingdom come'. It all adds up to the movie game of J-I-N-G-O, which ought to be a felony". Hal Hinson of The Washington Post wrote: "We could say this is mind-bogglingly insulting, lowest-common-denominator-style filmmaking, that it's gratuitously racist and violent and just plain dumb, but then wouldn't that be stating the obvious? But what response would be fitting and adequate and not be obvious? Keening? Shrieking? A full-fledged, spread-eagle tantrum?"

== See also ==
- List of American films of 1988
- Chuck Norris filmography
