= The President's Man =

2000 film directed by Eric Norris

- Official DVD cover
- Written by: Bob Gookin
- Directed by: Michael Preece
- Starring: Chuck Norris; Dylan Neal; Jennifer Tung; Soon-Tek Oh; Jonathan Nichols
- Music by: Christopher L. Stone
- Country of origin: United States
- Original language: English

Production
- Executive producers: Chuck Norris; Aaron Norris
- Producer: Garry A. Brown
- Cinematography: Rick Anderson; Karl Kases
- Editor: David Latham
- Running time: 90 minutes
- Production company: Norris Brothers Entertainment
- Budget: $2 million

Original release
- Network: CBS
- Release: April 2, 2000

Related
- The President's Man: A Line in the Sand (2002)

The President's Man is a 2000 American made-for-television action film starring Chuck Norris, Dylan Neal, Ralph Waite and Stuart Whitman in his last role. A sequel, The President's Man: A Line in the Sand was made in 2002, it is the first installment in The President's Man film series. It was first shown on CBS on April 2, 2000.

== Plot ==
Joshua McCord (Norris) is thinking about retiring from his grueling job as The President's Man, a secret agent not affiliated with any intelligence agency who is assigned to carry out missions by the President of the United States (Waite), and answers to the President alone. Before he can retire, he must save the First Lady (Adams), who has been kidnapped by a mysterious band of terrorists.

While McCord struggles with the end of his career, his daughter/aide (Tung), seeks out candidates to become his replacement. Through her search she finds Deke Slater (Neal) a former Army sergeant with a temper serving a 30-year sentence in federal prison.

== Cast ==
- Chuck Norris as Agent Joshua McCord
- Dylan Neal as Sgt. Deke Slater
- Jennifer Tung as Que McCord
- Ralph Waite as President Matthews
- Marla Adams as First Lady Matthews
- Stuart Whitman as George Williams
- Soon-Tek Oh as General Vinh Tran
- Jonathan Nichols as Don Diego Santiago
- Brigitta Dau as Lee McCord
- Ariel Chipman as Terry Anderson
- Greg Ricks as Dr. Francis Anderson
- Ken Farmer as The Judge
- Mark Dalton as Delta Force Soldier

== Production ==
=== Filming ===
The filming of The President's Man took place from the November 30, 1999 to March 21, 2000, entirely in Dallas and Camp Hoblitzelle Midlothian, Texas, and South Padre Island, Texas with a budget of 2,000,000 U.S. dollars.

== Release ==
=== Television and home media ===
On April 2, 2000, the television-film had its American premiere on CBS. Months after it was released on DVD in other countries including France, the United Kingdom and Argentina. In Italy it was released in the first TV in 2001.

== Sequel ==
A sequel, titled The President's Man: A Line in the Sand, first aired on CBS in 2002.

== See also ==
- List of American films of 2000
- Chuck Norris filmography
