= The Delta Force =

1986 film by Menahem Golan

- Theatrical release poster
- Directed by: Menahem Golan
- Written by: James Bruner; Menahem Golan
- Produced by: Menahem Golan; Yoram Globus
- Starring: Chuck Norris; Lee Marvin; Martin Balsam; Joey Bishop; Kim Delaney; Robert Forster; Lainie Kazan; George Kennedy; Hanna Schygulla; Susan Strasberg; Bo Svenson; Robert Vaughn; Shelley Winters
- Cinematography: David Gurfinkel
- Edited by: Alain Jakubowicz
- Music by: Alan Silvestri
- Production company: Golan-Globus Productions
- Distributed by: The Cannon Group
- Release date: February 14, 1986
- Running time: 129 minutes
- Countries: Israel; United States
- Languages: English; Arabic
- Budget: $9 million
- Box office: $17.76 million (U.S.A.Collection)

The Delta Force is a 1986 American action film starring Chuck Norris and Lee Marvin (in his final film appearance) as leaders of an elite group of Special Operations Forces personnel based on the real-life U.S. Army Delta Force unit. Directed, co-written and co-produced by Menahem Golan, the film features Martin Balsam, Joey Bishop, Robert Vaughn, Steve James, Robert Forster, Shelley Winters and George Kennedy. It is the first installment in The Delta Force film series. Two sequels were produced, entitled Delta Force 2: The Colombian Connection and the direct-to-video Delta Force 3: The Killing Game. The Delta Force was inspired by the hijacking of TWA Flight 847.

== Plot ==
In 1980, Operation Eagle Claw is aborted after a fatal helicopter crash, with the U.S. Delta Force evacuating to their C-130 transports. Among them is Captain Scott McCoy, who, against orders, rescues his wounded comrade, Pete Peterson, from the burning helicopter before the team finally evacuates. McCoy expresses his disgust for the politicians and the military hierarchy that forced the mission to launch despite the risks, and announces his resignation.

Five years later, in 1985, a group of Palestinian terrorists hijacks American Travelways Airlines Flight 282, a Boeing 707 flying from Cairo to New York City via Athens and Rome. Taking all 144 passengers and crew hostage on the Athens—Rome leg, the New World Revolutionary Organization, led by two terrorists named Abdul Rafai and Mustafa, force Captain Roger Campbell and his crew to fly the 707 to Beirut, where they make demands to the United States government that, if not met, will result in the death of all the hostages. During the crisis, they segregate the Jewish passengers from the Americans by forcing a reluctant flight purser of German heritage named Ingrid Harding to identify them. Another passenger, Catholic priest William O'Malley, joins the Jews in solidarity. Unbeknownst to the authorities, the Jewish hostages and O'Malley are then taken off the plane and transported to a militant-controlled area of Beirut, while a dozen additional henchmen are brought on board.

The flight departs for Algiers, where the terrorists release the female hostages and children. Meanwhile, Delta Force, led by Colonel Nick Alexander and the recalled-to-duty and newly promoted Major McCoy are deployed to resolve the crisis. With the female and children hostages evacuated, Delta Force launches its assault, only to discover that there are additional hijackers on board. When Delta Force blows its cover, Abdul kills a U.S. Navy diver named Tom Hale. He then forces the pilots to return to Beirut and takes the remaining male passengers with him.

Upon returning to Beirut, the terrorists transport the passengers to a separate location, while the pilots and two male flight attendants remain in the 707. Working with a sympathetic Greek Orthodox priest, Israeli Army Intelligence prepares an operation to free the hostages. McCoy and Peterson are able to enter into Lebanon disguised as a Canadian television crew. In a prolonged campaign against the terrorists, Delta Force bides its time to identify the terrorist leaders and locate the hostages. Once the hostages are located, Delta Force assaults the terrorist holdouts, freeing the hostages and evacuating them to the airport. During the battle, McCoy, Peterson, and their team hunt for Abdul and the Jewish hostages. They kill most of the militants, but Abdul gravely wounds Peterson and flees. While the commandos tend to Peterson, McCoy chases Abdul and tracks him down to a nearby abandoned home. He then engages him in a vicious hand-to-hand fight, breaking Abdul's arm. As the terrorist leader prepares to shoot McCoy, he is killed when McCoy launches a rocket into his car.

With the hostages and rescue teams secured, the team seizes Flight 282 by secretly infiltrating the airfield through a cotton plantation. Using silenced weapons, Alexander and the Delta team kill the terrorist guards and save the crew. They board the 707 with all of the hostages, taking off for Israel just as McCoy storms the runway on his motorcycle, managing to board after destroying several terrorist jeeps. On board, the team tends to the wounded passengers and the dying Peterson. After having confirmed the hostages are safe and en route home, Peterson says his farewells to McCoy before succumbing to his wounds. In the main cabin, the ex-hostages and Delta commandos join in a rousing rendition of "America The Beautiful," not knowing about Peterson's death, except for Alexander, Bobby, McCoy, and O'Malley. In Israel, the Boeing 707 lands safely, and the hostages are greeted by their families, while Delta Force disembarks with Peterson's body in tow to its C-130. The team concludes its operation and departs for the United States amid celebrations by the passengers.

== Cast ==
- Chuck Norris as Major Scott McCoy, the deputy commander of the Delta Force unit.
- Lee Marvin as Colonel Nick Alexander, the commander of the Delta Force unit.
- Robert Vaughn as General Woodbridge, US general, Army Chief of Staff.
- Steve James as Bobby Lee, a member of the Delta Force unit and a friend of Scott.
- William Wallace as Pete Peterson, a member of the unit who dies near the end of the film.
- Jerry Weinstock as Dr. Jack, the military doctor of the unit.
- Shaike Ophir as Father Nicholas, a Greek-Orthodox hieromonk who provides intelligence to the Israelis.
- Robert Forster as Abdul Rafai, the leader of the terrorist group.
- David Menahem as Mustafa, member of the terrorist group.
- Avi Loziah as Jaffar, another member of the terrorist group.
- Uri Gavriel as Jamil Rafai, commander of the military terrorist group and Abdul's brother.
- Adiv Gahshan as Salim, member of the military terrorist group.
- Bo Svenson as Captain Roger Campbell
- Hanna Schygulla as Flight purser Ingrid Harding
- Martin Balsam as Ben Kaplan
- Shelley Winters as Edie Kaplan
- Joey Bishop as Harry Goldman
- Lainie Kazan as Sylvia Goldman
- George Kennedy as Father William O'Malley
- Kim Delaney as Sister Mary
- Chelli Goldenberg as Tina
- Charles Floye as U.S. Navy Diver Tom Hale
- Howard Jackson as Ed
- Jerry Lazarus as Robert Levine
- Susan Strasberg as Debra Levine
- Natalie Roth as Ellen Levine

Kevin Dillon, Liam Neeson, and Mykelti Williamson also appear as extras where they portray Delta Force members.

== Production ==
=== Development ===
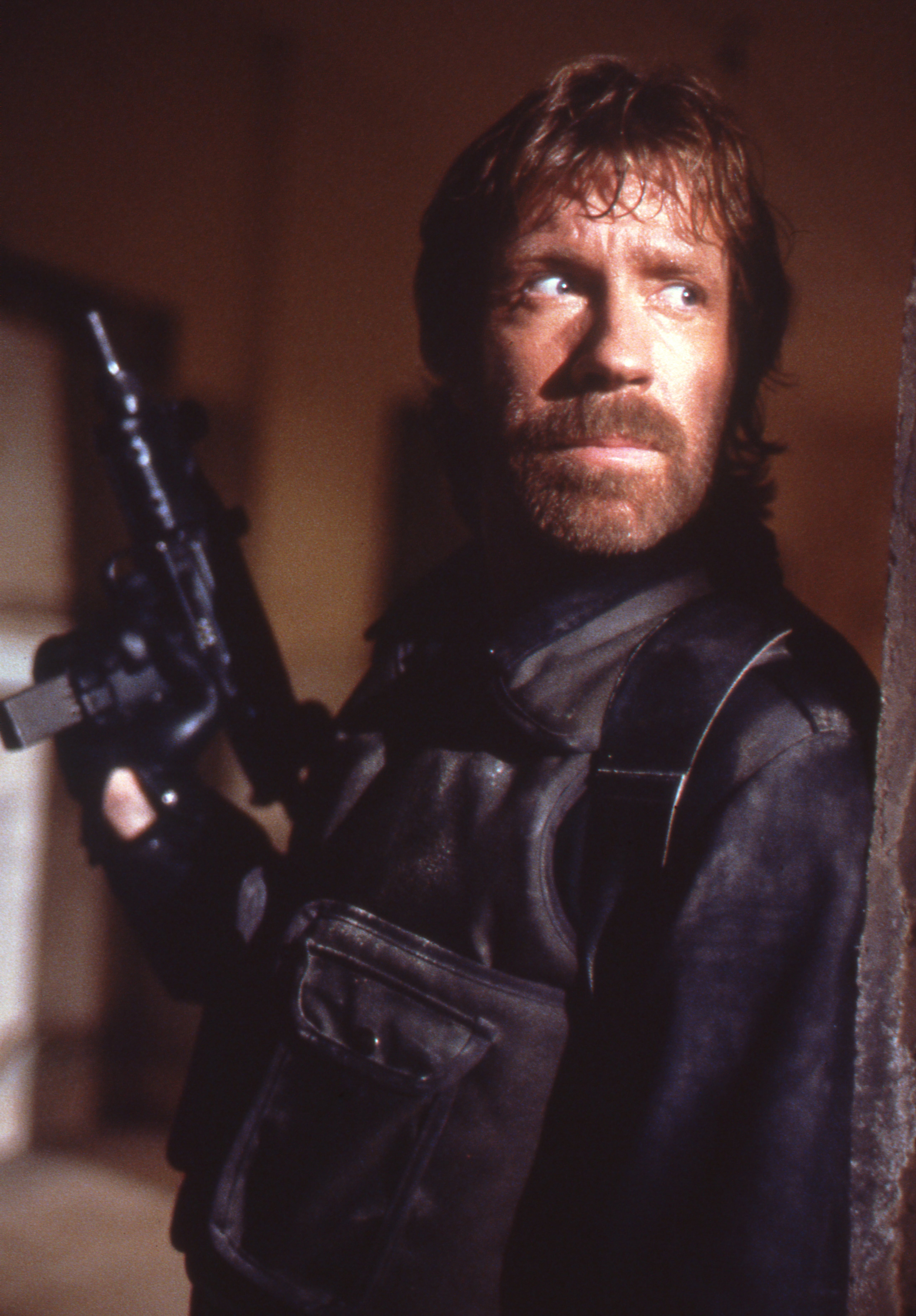
Chuck Norris on the film set

In 1985, it was announced that The Delta Force would be made with Chuck Norris and Charles Bronson co-starring and Joseph Zito directing. The budget was to be $12 million.

"We look at Chuck as having the potential of a Clint Eastwood," said Menahem Golan. "His acting talent is getting better. He's in the right style, and he's very popular."

In response to the hijacking of TWA flight 847, Norris said the United States is becoming a "paper tiger" in the Middle East. "What we're facing here is the fact that our passive approach to terrorism is going to instigate much more terrorism throughout the world," he said, adding, "I would have sent the Delta Force immediately."

"I've been all over the world, and seeing the devastation that terrorism has done in Europe and the Middle East, I know eventually it's going to come here," added Norris. "It's just a matter of time. They're doing all this devastation in Europe now, and the next stepping stone is America and Canada. Being a free country, with the freedom of movement that we have, it's an open door policy for terrorism. It's like Khadafy said a few weeks ago. 'If Reagan doesn't back off, I'm going to release my killer squads in America.' And there's no doubt in my mind that he has them."

Bronson dropped out of the film due to his commitment to a project named Act of Vengeance (1986). August 1, 1985, Lee Marvin signed on as Bronson's replacement. Also producer Menahem Golan replaced Zito for directorial duties. Marvin said the film "shows the American audience a larger view of terrorism than they're used to seeing on the small screen and the news. There you see a plane at the end of the runway. But what's it like to be on a plane as the facilities deterioriate? It's bad enough on a seven-hour flight – imagine what the bathrooms are like after three or four days."

Norris's fee was a reported $2 million.

"It is the first time that Chuck works with an ensemble of first-class actors," said Golan.

Before the film came out Cannon signed a seven-picture contract with Norris.

=== Filming ===
Filming started in October 1985. The Delta Force was entirely shot in Israel. Pentagon scenes were shot at the GG Israel Studios facility near Jerusalem, owned by Menahem Golan and Yoram Globus.

The Athens, Beirut, Algiers, and Tel Aviv airport scenes were filmed at Ben Gurion International Airport and its military portion, Lod Air Base, although one Athens airport scene where an accomplice of the hijackers exits a taxi, was filmed at the eastern terminal of Ellinikon International Airport while the Athens airport concourse (interior) scenes were filmed in Ben Gurion's present-day Terminal 1 (then the main terminal). However, the scenes of Algiers Airport where Colonel Alexander meets with the flight purser and the US ambassador to Algeria was filmed in Atarot Airport, with the terminal dressed and decorated with Arabic and French signs to resemble Algiers.

Jaffa was used for scenes of the siege and hostage rescue in the Beirut countryside including midnight oceanic scenes. The film's budget was $9 million.

=== Vehicles ===
The Lockheed C-130H Hercules in the film actually belonged to the Israeli Air Force, registered as 89–9106. It was lent to the Golan-Globus company for filming after it was given a false registration, 14X-FBB and U.S. Air Force designs. Its lease arrangement was similar to Iron Eagle, wherein the United States Air Force refused to participate due to a long-standing policy about not cooperating on any film involving the theft of an aircraft, causing the filmmakers to turn to the Israeli Air Force for the necessary aerial sequences. The army vehicles for the military and terrorists came from the U.S. Army and Israel Defense Forces.

The Boeing 707-139(B) with the registration N778PA, was operated by several airlines including Olympic Airways, Aer Lingus, Saudia, Turkish Airlines, Pan American World Airways, which operated it as Clipper Skylark from 1962 to 1976. Prior to filming in 1985, the aircraft had been operated by Israeli charter-operator MAOF Air and was retired from commercial service in December 1984. The aircraft was then leased to Golan-Globus Productions in late 1985 while in storage at Tel Aviv (just after the TWA-847 hijacking) and repainted with the fake airline name "American Transworld Airlines" while retaining the MAOF livery, but later changed to "American Travelways Airlines" to avoid confusion and legal action. Upon completion of the film, it was sold to Jet Avionic Systems Incorporated on May 28, 1985. Aerocar Aviation acquired it in January 1986 and sold it to Boeing Military Aircraft Company on March 20, 1986, to be used as a source of spares for the Boeing KC-135 Stratotanker program. The U.S. Air Force acquired it later on and parted its vertical stabilizer and engines for the Boeing KC-135E Stratotanker. N778PA was destroyed by fire in a welding accident while in storage at Davis-Monthan Air Force Base in 1992. Portions of the airframe may still exist.

The 1985 Suzuki SP600 motorcycle used by Chuck Norris was designed by Suzuki specifically for the film. After modifying it and adding the weaponry, Suzuki America gave the bike to Golan-Globus production in Israel prior to filming.

=== Historical resemblances ===
The film, although fiction, draws inspiration from two real-life events; the flight 847 hijacking and Operation Entebbe. Below are a key elements from both real-life and film.

==== TWA Flight 847 ====
- The hijacked TWA 847 took off from Athens on 14 June 1985; the film's ATW likewise departed Athens, on 19 July 1985.
- The movie airline, American Travelways Airlines, is abbreviated as ATW, an anagram of Trans World Airlines. While the plane used is a Boeing 707, TWA used a Boeing 727 for flight 847.
- Both airlines originated from Cairo, with stops in Athens and Rome. Unlike TWA 847 which has two more stopovers in Boston and Los Angeles before ending in San Diego, the film's flight terminates in New York.
- Two terrorists hijack the flight; the third is arrested in Athens in both real-life and film.
- The flight is managed by a German American flight purser, who is forced by the hijackers to segregate Jewish passengers from the non-Jews by identifying them through collected passports. Real-life flight attendant Uli Derickson, who was the purser of TWA Flight 847, served as the basis for Ingrid Harding, the film's purser.
- Three U.S. Navy members are on board the flight and are held hostage; one is shot and dumped off the plane into the tarmac. While this incident happened at night in both real-life and film, the latter depicts the setting as Algiers as opposed to Beirut in the former.
- Additional henchmen board the plane along with the released hijacker.
- Women and children are released; among them is a pregnant passenger.

=== Operation Entebbe ===
- The hostage rescue scene when the commandos raid the terrorist quarters
- A pregnant woman is on the flight. Unlike flight 847, this passenger is the first to be released after pretending to either go into labor or suffer miscarriage.
- A single casualty among the rescuers, near the end of the operation.

== Music ==
Alan Silvestri's electronic score was also used by ABC Sports as the intro to their Indianapolis 500 broadcasts from 1988–1998 and again in 2001. It was also used for the intro of the Brickyard 400 until ABC lost the race rights to NBC Sports in 2001. According to famous Indianapolis 500 anchor Paul Page, he does not want any ESPN/ABC anchor to use this music in intros for the Indianapolis 500 and Brickyard 400 unless he narrates the intros himself. It is now used on the XM Satellite broadcasts of IndyCar racing events, of which Paul Page is the announcer.

The soundtrack album was initially released by Enigma Records, and later by Milan Records (minus "The Rescue") on an album paired with Jerry Goldsmith's King Solomon's Mines; in 2008 Intrada Records issued a limited edition CD with the entire score. Quartet Records released a two-disc set in 2013 featuring the Intrada album programme on disc one and the Enigma album listing on disc two; all are now out of production.

== Reception ==
=== Box office ===
The Delta Force opened in 1,720 theaters and debuted as #3 in the box office losing to The Color Purple and Down and Out in Beverly Hills; it beat A Nightmare on Elm Street 2: Freddy's Revenge and Youngblood. The Delta Force earned $5,959,505 on its opening weekend and had a total gross of $17,768,900 in the United States. The film was released on DVD on September 28, 2000. The Delta Force has been released on Blu-ray in the US, and more recently in the UK by video label Arrow Films.

=== Critical response ===
Rotten Tomatoes, a review aggregator, reports as of January 2026 that 14% of 14 surveyed critics gave the film a positive review. On Metacritic the film has a weighted average score of 37 out of 100, based on 9 critics, indicating "generally unfavorable reviews". Among the film's biggest supporters were Roger Ebert, who called it "a well-made action film that tantalizes us with its parallels to real life", and Vincent Canby, who called it the 1986 film with the most "sheer, unashamed, hilariously vulgar vaingloriousness". On the other hand, Gene Siskel labeled it the prime specimen of "second-rate action pictures", and Paul Attanasio found it another dime-a-dozen disaster movie that lacked the expected car chase action and martial arts scenes. Kevin Thomas also panned the film as "drawn out and complicated". Siskel was particularly upset at the profiting off of a political conflict with James Bond-style action, while Variety described it as "an exercise in wish fulfillment for those who favor using force instead of diplomacy". "I felt better after that film was made," said Norris. "I did, I swear to God. I think it's a way for other people to release their tensions. I think it's good therapy.

== Sequels ==
Marvin did publicity for the film, which was rare for him. He said the movie was "a good flick" and admitted "but I guess I might be protecting myself, keeping the doors open" with Cannon. "There aren't too many firm film offers these days that guarantee money up front." Marvin was considering doing a sequel where Delta Force would rescue hostages after a terrorist skyjacking of a luxury liner.

Cannon announced they would make a TV series. This did not materialize. However the film led to two sequels; Delta Force 2: The Colombian Connection in 1990 and Delta Force 3: The Killing Game in 1991.

== Novelization ==
A novelization based on the film by Joel Norst titled The Delta Force, was released in 1986.

== See also ==
- List of American films of 1986
- Chuck Norris filmography

== Bibliography ==
- Andrew, Yule (1987). Hollywood a Go-Go: The True Story of the Cannon Film Empire. New York City: Sphere Books. p. 189. ISBN 9780722193891.
