= Missing in Action (film) =

1984 film by Joseph Zito

- Theatrical release poster by Stan Watts
- Directed by: Joseph Zito
- Screenplay by: James Bruner
- Story by: John M. Crowther; Lance Hool
- Produced by: Menahem Golan; Yoram Globus
- Starring: Chuck Norris; M. Emmet Walsh; Lenore Kasdorf; James Hong; David Tress
- Cinematography: João Fernandes
- Edited by: Joel Goodman; Daniel Loewenthal
- Music by: Jay Chattaway
- Production company: The Cannon Group
- Distributed by: Metro-Goldwyn-Mayer
- Release date: November 16, 1984
- Running time: 100 minutes
- Country: United States
- Languages: English; Vietnamese
- Budget: $2.1 million or $3.9 million
- Box office: $22.8 million

Missing in Action is a 1984 American action film starring Chuck Norris and directed by Joseph Zito. The film is set in the context of the Vietnam War POW/MIA issue. Colonel Braddock, who escaped a Vietnamese prisoner of war camp ten years earlier, returns to Vietnam to find American soldiers listed as missing in action during the Vietnam War. The film was followed by a prequel, Missing in Action 2: The Beginning (1985), and a sequel, Braddock: Missing in Action III (1988); it is the first installment in the Missing in Action film series. The first two Missing in Action installments had been filmed back-to-back with the intent to have the first film involve the POW years of Braddock (as directed by Lance Hool) be the first film. However, it was determined that the commercial prospects were stronger with the film directed by Zito involving the POW rescue. As such, Hool's film was turned into Missing in Action 2 and labeled as a prequel that detailed events before those in Missing in Action.

It is the first of a series of films themed around the Vietnam War POW/MIA issue that were produced by Menahem Golan and Yoram Globus and released under their Cannon Films banner, with whom Norris would have a long professional relationship. Norris later dedicated these films to his younger brother Wieland. Wieland, a private in the 101st Airborne Division, had been killed in June 1970 in Vietnam while on patrol in the defense of Firebase Ripcord. The film, however, was criticized heavily as being a preemptive cash-in on the Rambo franchise, with both the first and second Missing in Action films being released just months before the second Rambo film.

Despite the overwhelmingly negative reception from critics, the film was a commercial success and has become one of Chuck Norris's most popular films. It was also Chuck Norris's first film with The Cannon Group.

== Plot ==
Colonel James Braddock is a US military officer who spent 2 1/2 years in a North Vietnamese prisoner of war camp which he escaped 10 years ago. After the war, Braddock accompanies a government investigation team that travels to Ho Chi Minh City to investigate reports of U.S. soldiers still held prisoner. Braddock obtains the evidence then travels to Thailand, where he meets Jack "Tuck" Tucker, an old Army friend turned black market kingpin. Together, they launch a mission deep into the jungle to free the U.S. POWs from General Tran.

== Cast ==
- Chuck Norris as Colonel James Thomas Braddock
- M. Emmet Walsh as Jack "Tuck" Tucker
- David Tress as Senator Maxwell Porter
- Lenore Kasdorf as Ann Fitzgerald
- Ernie Ortega as General Vinh
- James Hong as General Tran
- E. Erich Anderson as Masucci
- Pierrino Mascarino as Jacques
- Joseph Carberry as Carter
- Avi Kleinberger as Dalton
- Willie Williams as Randall
- Bella Flores as Madame Pearl
- Augusto Victa as General Yung
- Jean-Claude Van Damme "J. Claude Van Damme" as stuntman, uncredited as a soldier extra

== Production ==
=== Development ===
The name of Braddock was inspired by The Graduate character, Benjamin Braddock, played by Dustin Hoffman. The producers' idea was to create a Vietnam War hero with the name of a lazy Californian student.

The concept for the film originated from a treatment, written by James Cameron in 1983, for the film Rambo: First Blood Part II that was floating around Hollywood at the time.

Screenwriter James Bruner said "the thing that started all of this was the book called "Mission MIA" by James Pollock, an ex-Delta Force guy. A lot of people read it, including Chuck, and that’s what gave them the idea for doing an MIA picture. I mean, I didn’t know anything about Cameron having a [Vietnam] project.“ Bruner says the MIA / POW issue “was talked about a lot. Maybe not in New York and Los Angeles, but the rest of the country. It was a very emotional thing.

Norris says he was approached to make the film by Lance Hool, who had a script about American POWs in Vietnam. Norris was enthusiastic as he wanted to pay tribute to his brother Wieland. Vietnam films were not popular at the time however and Norris and Hool received numerous rejections.

Norris said he tried "to instill a positive attitude" about the Vietnam War by making the film, but also said that Vietnam was a tragic mistake.

He commented on own political direction: "I am a conservative, a real flag waver, a big Ronald Reagan fan. I'm not so much a Republican or Democrat; I go more for the man himself. Ronald Reagan says what he thinks, he's not afraid to speak his mind, even if he may be unpopular. I want a strong leader and he is a strong leader. And ever since he has been in office there has been a more positive, patriotic feeling in this country".

Hool and Norris took the project to Cannon Films, who liked the project. They already had a script in development about the rescue of American POWS in Vietnam, and signed Norris to make both films. The first, Missing in Action, would be about Braddock's rescue of POWS. The second, Missing in Action 2, would be a prequel about Braddock's years as a POW. The two films were shot back-to-back. Joseph Zito directed the first, and Hool the second.

=== Filming ===
Filming was to have started in Saint Kitts in January 1984, but the films ended up being shot in the Philippines.

According to Norris: "I'm not quite as anti-government as Rambo is. When the helicopter comes to rescue Rambo and the American MIA (missing in action), and then leaves them stranded, I found that unrealistic. There is not an American pilot alive who would leave them there. They'd have to shoot me to stop me from picking them up, because I'd be dead inside if I didn't".

== Reception ==
=== Box office ===
The film was popular at the box office, one of the most successful ever made by Cannon. It made $6 million in its first weekend and earned over $10 million in rentals in the US. It resulted in a profit to Cannon of $6.5 million on the basis of its US release alone.

By 1985 it earned $26 million.

=== Critical response ===
Norris said: "One of the biggest thrills of my life came when I went to a theatre to see Missing in Action, and all the people stood up and applauded at the end. That's when my character brings some POWs he's just rescued to a conference in Saigon, where the politicians are saying there aren't any more prisoners of war".

Janet Maslin of The New York Times wrote that it's possible from watching the film "to come away with the misimpression that Mr. Norris has not said a word. He does talk, of course, but his real eloquence is exclusively physical. There's not quite enough of it to explain why someone of Mr. Norris's taciturn manner and unprepossessing blond looks has managed to become an international B-movie star. But there is enough to carry a simple, bullet-riddled, crowd-pleasing action movie like this one". Variety noted: "With the Philippines filling in for Vietnam jungles, with Norris kicking and firing away, with a likable sidekick in the black marketeering figure of M. Emmet Walsh, and with a touch of nudity in sordid Bangkok bars; writer James Bruner and director Joseph Zito have marshalled a formula pic with a particularly jingoistic slant; the Commies in Vietnam still deserve the smack of the bullet". Kevin Thomas of the Los Angeles Times wrote: "Missing in Action (citywide) is so shrewdly tailored to Norris' stoic persona and physical skills that it's one of his best films to date ... The only problem is its lack of suspense: You just know that Norris is going to succeed in his mission. Come to think of it, why did it take the invincible Norris eight years to make good his own escape?" Richard Christiansen of the Chicago Tribune gave the film 2 stars out of 4 and wrote that "Norris stolidly delivers as the strong, silent loner who cuts through government red tape to nail the villains and rescue the oppressed, and the fact that any American soldier beats the Vietnamese (shown to be slimy, sadistic brutes) may bring cheer to many people. Overall, however, this is standard war action, not very energetically filmed but zipped up with a little female nudity and much technological trickery". Paul Attanasio of The Washington Post wrote: "Chuck Norris fans will not be disappointed by Missing in Action, a bang-bang you're dead exploitation flick from the Cannon Group in which the action is rarely missing ... Norris doesn't do much acting—he's the poor man's Clint Eastwood—but his karate is crackerjack. And Walsh is hammily engaging as Braddock's sidekick".

Scott Weinberg of eFilmCritic.com gave the film 2 stars out of 5, writing that "Norris does Stallone... badly" in his review. In a 2003 BBC article entitled "Rambo: Pretenders to the Throne", Almar Haflidason wrote that "the runaway success of the Rambo trilogy inspired dozens of rip-offs", citing that the Missing in Action series was the most famous of the Rambo clones.

The 1996 movie guide "Seen That, Now What?", gave the film a rating of "C", stating "Vietnam vet Norris returns to Southeast Asia to rescue American POWs in this Rambo rip-off, with one-note villains, a politically misguided theme, and second-rate action sequences".

Derek Adams of Time Out wrote that the film was "so bad that it defies belief. It's xenophobic, amateurish and extraordinarily dull". He also labeled it as "all-gooks-are-baddies propaganda". On AMC's movie guide, Jeremy Beday of Rovi described the film as a "crass, dopey Rambo-esque film that ultimately fails to connect with anything interesting in the realm of fact or fiction" and that its "chop-socky, shoot-em-up, explosion-a-minute action quickly wears thin". Steve Crum of Video-Reviewmaster.com wrote "The best of Chuck Norris in film, and that isn't saying much" Earl Cressey of DVD Talk reported in 2000: "I found Missing in Action to be fairly enjoyable with great action sequences and a pretty good plot. However, only Braddock's character is developed at all; the other characters make an appearance to move the story along, and then disappear". On Rotten Tomatoes the film has an approval rating of 19% based on 16 reviews. The websites Letterboxd and The Grindhouse Database list this movie as belonging to the vetsploitation subgenre.

== Franchise ==
=== Prequel ===
A prequel titled Missing in Action 2: The Beginning, was released in 1985.

=== Sequel ===
A sequel titled Braddock: Missing in Action III, was released in 1988.

== See also ==
- List of American films of 1984
- Chuck Norris filmography
- P.O.W. The Escape, a 1986 film on the same subject, also from Cannon.

== Notes ==
- Norris, Chuck; Hyams, Joe (1988). The secret of inner strength: my story. Little, Brown. ISBN 9780316611916.
