= Top Dog (1995 film) =

- Theatrical release poster
- Directed by: Aaron Norris
- Screenplay by: Ron Swanson
- Story by: Aaron Norris; Tim Grayem
- Produced by: Andy Howard
- Starring: Chuck Norris
- Cinematography: Joao Fernandes
- Edited by: Peter Schink
- Music by: George S. Clinton
- Production company: Tanglewood Entertainment Group
- Distributed by: Live Entertainment
- Release date: April 28, 1995
- Running time: 86 minutes
- Country: United States
- Language: English
- Budget: $6 million
- Box office: $5.1 million

Top Dog is a 1995 American buddy cop action comedy film directed by Aaron Norris and starring Chuck Norris. Written by Aaron Norris and Tim Grayem, it was Norris' last film to release theatrically before he shifted to direct-to-video films for several years.

In the film, Norris' character, Jake Wilder, is partnered with Reno, a police dog, whose handler was killed. Jake and Reno investigate a plot by domestic terrorists to attack a conference on unity. Jake and Reno survive assassination attempts and several hand-to-hand fights with the terrorists and eventually discover enough clues to foil the attack. The film is set in San Diego and was largely filmed there.

The film received mainly negative reviews, and its box office was negatively impacted by the timing of its release, only 9 days after the Oklahoma City bombing.

== Plot ==
The film opens as two white nationalists destroy an apartment complex in which most of the residents are minorities. Veteran police officer, Sgt. Lou Swanson, and his police dog, Reno, investigate the crime and realize the explosives are military in style. Their investigation takes them to the harbor, where they find a ship loaded with weapons. They are discovered and shot. Lou dies, but Reno survives.

Maverick cop Jake Wilder, is called by police captain Ken Callahan, who requests Jake to take over the case. Jake is angered that he has to work with Reno, despite Reno proving himself capable through a battle training scenario.

Meanwhile, Neo-Nazis are trying to smuggle weapons across the border from Mexico. It is implied that they murdered their Mexican arms dealers. They are stopped by the Border Patrol and try to escape, but their car is destroyed in the process.

Jake and Reno survive an assassination attempt at Jake's home. Afterwards, Jake is visiting his mother, who reveals that Adolf Hitler's birthday will be the following day. Jake realizes this a clue, and takes off running. The police department works with the sheriff's office, as well as the FBI in determining where the Neo-Nazis are going to hit. One officer reveals that on Hitler's birthday (April 20), the Pope, and several other of his esteemed bishops will host the Coalition for Racial Unity.

As the Neo-Nazis hitmen are practicing for their attack, the leaders are revealed not to be just one white supremacist group, but an alliance of several including the Ku Klux Klan, the Aryan Nations, and the Church of the Creator. They plan to use their attack on the Coalition for Racial Unity as an opportunity to unite all the Neo-Nazi groups in the US, as well as the world.

Jake discovers the location of the warehouse where the Neo-Nazis are located. He and Reno go undercover and manage to steal a piece of evidence that could be used to convict the Neo-Nazi leaders. They are discovered and Jake orders Reno to flee with the evidence. Wilder subdues several radicals during the following fight, however he is finally captured, after a dozen attackers confront him at all once, and he is then hit on the head with a blunt object. He wakes up to find that he is tied up and the Neo-Nazi plan is now under way. Reno finds Jake, and eats away his rope bindings, just before a Neo-Nazi has the chance to kill him. Jake is able to call the police chief and tells him that the plan is in motion.

The police, FBI, CTU, and Sheriff's Department arrive as the Coalition for Racial Unity is attacked and in a gun battle many Neo-Nazis are killed. The Pope and his Bishops get in their bulletproof car, but it is rigged to explode. Wilder defuses the bomb, while Reno goes after the Neo-Nazi leader. Wilder chases after him as well, and after a vicious fight, manages to subdue him. Reno is set to attack the Neo-Nazi leader, who confesses to killing Reno's former veteran cop owner. Just before Reno can attack the leader, Lou's grandson, Matthew, arrives to stop him.

== Cast ==
- Chuck Norris as Lieutenant Jake Wilder
- Michele Lamar Richards as Det. Savannah Boyette
- Erik von Detten as Matthew Swanson
- Carmine Caridi as Sgt. Lou Swanson
- Clyde Kusatsu as Capt. Ken Callahan
- Kai Wulff as Otto Dietrich
- Peter Savard Moore as Karl Koller
- Timothy Bottoms as Nelson Houseman
- Francesco Quinn as Mark Curtains
- Herta Ware as Mrs. Wilder
- John Kerry as Cmdr. West
- Hank Baumert as Border Patrol Officer
- Linda Castro as Paramedic
- John Sistrunk as Driver at border
- Bob Bastanchury as Passenger
- Eileen Bowman as Female Detective
- Digby and Betty as Reno

== Production ==
According to Tim Grayem, the idea for the film came around his interactions with Aaron Norris, as the two were good friends from their time living as neighbors in Santa Clarita. The two thought of ideas that could make a buddy cop movie, but with a dog that playfully could star Aaron's brother Chuck. One thing led to another in having a script that could have Norris do a family-friendly feature that ended up being liked by Chuck enough to do it on summer break from Walker, Texas Ranger. While being a fan of Aaron, Grayem noted that the Norris type of movie "has always been, I would say, derivative of something else. And this was really a version K-9 or a version of Turner and Hooch."; executive producer Seth Willenson contended that they made their film as one that "certainly wasn't something we were consciously aware of while putting the film together". Two dogs were used in the film. Both Grayem and Norris wanted to make sure that the film had a strong anti-racism message, with editor Peter Schink noting that the distributor was not too happy for the first cut of the film that resulted in the Neo Nazis being toned down a bit.

Shooting took place in San Diego. When the filmmakers wanted to shoot in a residential area of Point Loma, they solicited support from residents by inviting them to the shoot.

== Release ==
=== Theatrical ===
Top Dog was released only 9 days after the Oklahoma City bombing. Because the film's plot deals with terrorism, the poor timing of the film's release was noted in multiple reviews and articles. Seth Willenson argued that the film being caught up in the merger between Turner and Warner Bros. hindered its chances of getting great distribution. The film debuted at number eight at the box office. According to Peter Schink, when he took his date out to the theater to see the movie on the Friday that the film opened, they were the only two people at the screening.

== Reception ==
=== Critical response ===
Rotten Tomatoes reports that 0% of eight surveyed critics gave the film a positive review; the average rating is 1.8/10. The film was criticised for being too similar to K-9 and Turner & Hooch.

== See also ==
- Chuck Norris filmography
- List of American films of 1995
- List of media set in San Diego
