= Hellbound (film) =

- Theatrical release poster
- Directed by: Aaron Norris
- Written by: Ian Rabin & Anthony Ridio and Brent V. Friedman (Story); Galen Thompson and Brent V. Friedman (Screenplay)
- Produced by: Dean Raphael Ferrandini; Anthony Ridio
- Starring: Chuck Norris; Calvin Levels; Christopher Neame; Sheree J. Wilson; David Robb
- Cinematography: João Fernandes
- Edited by: Michael J. Duthie; Peter S. Elliot
- Music by: George S. Clinton
- Production companies: The Cannon Group; Cannon Films; Anthony Ridio Productions; Globus Pictures
- Distributed by: Cannon Films; Motion Picture Company of Australia Limited; Warner Home Video
- Release date: January 21, 1994
- Running time: 95 minutes
- Country: United States
- Language: English

Hellbound is a 1994 American action supernatural thriller film starring Chuck Norris, Calvin Levels and Christopher Neame. It was directed by Aaron Norris and written by Ian Rabin, Anthony Ridio and Brent Friedman. This was also the final picture made by Cannon Films prior to merging with Metro-Goldwyn-Mayer (not counting their pilot-movie for the Norris brothers' hit series Walker, Texas Ranger).

== Plot ==
Frank Shatter (Chuck Norris) and Calvin Jackson (Calvin Levels) are two Chicago Police detectives sent to investigate the brutal murder of a rabbi. As the investigation begins, Shatter and Jackson are summoned to Israel for questioning. Upon arrival, they realize that they are, in fact, pursuing a supernatural being – Satan's emissary, Prosatanos – who tried to wrest control of the world from God during the crusades. Prosatanos, however, was stopped by King Richard who trapped him in a subterranean tomb. During this encounter with King Richard, the source of Prosatanos' power – his scepter – was shattered into nine pieces which were subsequently sent to nine holy places around the world. These pieces remained safe until the end of the 20th century when Prosatanos was inadvertently freed from the tomb by two unsuspecting grave robbers. Prosatanos eventually collects all nine pieces of his scepter. Detectives Shatter and Jackson must now fight him to save the world.

== Cast ==
- Chuck Norris as Sergeant Frank Shatter
- Calvin Levels as Detective Calvin Jackson
- Christopher Neame as Professor Malcolm Lockley \ Prosatanos
- Sheree J. Wilson as Leslie Hawkins
- David Robb as Richard I of England
- Cherie Franklin as Captain Hull
- Jack Adalist as Reinhard Krieger
- Ezere Atar as Bezi
- Jack Messinger as Mahoney
- Elki Jackobs as Mort
- Nico Nitai as Friar
- Ori Levy as Rabbi Mordechai Shindler
- Tim Grayem as Bonehead
- Yoseph Peled as Holy Man
- Asher Tzarfati as Captain Arrad
- Korneel van den Bulck as Knight in the army

== Production ==
=== Filming ===
The film was shot entirely in Israel, between May and August 1992. In particular, the second part of the movie was filmed in Jerusalem.

The film's shooting title was originally Cold to the Touch.

== Reception ==
=== Critical response ===
Eoin Friel from "The Action Elite" scored the film two out of five and stated: "Overall, Hellbound is pretty lame, but on a purely guilty pleasure level it’s worth checking out. Just mute it when the sidekick is on screen."

Charles Tatum from "eFilm Critic" gave the film only one star and wrote: "This film is badly written, badly acted, and badly directed. It does not work as action, cop drama, or even horror. It just shows that the now defunct Cannon Studios was willing to throw their money into anything, no matter how badly it was planned."

Motion picture historian Leonard Maltin seemed to agree, giving the film 1.5 out of a possible 4 stars. According to himself, the movie combines "Too much acting from Neame, not enough acting from Norris, and a silly story with little action...That it was released directly to home-video two years after being shot certainly doesn't help."

== See also ==
- List of American films of 1994
