= List of American films of 1964 =

More than 150 American films were released in 1964.

My Fair Lady won the Academy Award for Best Picture.
The made-for-television film debuts when See How They Run is broadcast on NBC.

== A-C and 0-9 ==
Title	Director	Cast	Genre	Note
3 Nuts in Search of a Bolt	Tommy Noonan	Mamie Van Doren, Tommy Noonan	Comedy	Independent
633 Squadron	Walter Grauman	Cliff Robertson, George Chakiris, Maria Perschy	War	United Artists
7 Faces of Dr. Lao	George Pal	Tony Randall, Arthur O'Connell, Barbara Eden	Fantasy	MGM
The 7th Dawn	Lewis Gilbert	William Holden, Susannah York, Tetsurō Tamba	Adventure	United Artists
Advance to the Rear	George Marshall	Glenn Ford, Stella Stevens, Melvyn Douglas	Western	MGM
Apache Rifles	William Witney	Audie Murphy, Michael Dante, Linda Lawson	Western	20th Century Fox
The Americanization of Emily	Arthur Hiller	Julie Andrews, James Garner, James Coburn, Melvyn Douglas	War	MGM
Back Door to Hell	Monte Hellman	Jimmie Rodgers, Jack Nicholson, Annabelle Huggins	War	20th Century Fox
Batman Dracula	Andy Warhol		Avant-garde	
Bedtime Story	Ralph Levy	Marlon Brando, David Niven, Shirley Jones	Comedy	Universal; Remake of 1941 film
Behold a Pale Horse	Fred Zinnemann	Gregory Peck, Omar Sharif, Anthony Quinn	Drama	Columbia
The Best Man	Franklin J. Schaffner	Henry Fonda, Cliff Robertson, Lee Tracy, Edie Adams, Ann Sothern	Drama	United Artists. Written by Gore Vidal
Bikini Beach	William Asher	Frankie Avalon, Annette Funicello, Martha Hyer, Don Rickles	Comedy	AIP
Black Like Me	Carl Lerner	James Whitmore, Sorrell Booke, Roscoe Lee Browne	Drama	Independent
Blood on the Arrow	Sidney Salkow	Dale Robertson, Martha Hyer	Western	Allied Artists
The Brass Bottle	Harry Keller	Tony Randall, Burl Ives, Barbara Eden, Kamala Devi, Edward Andrews	Fantasy	Universal
Bullet for a Badman	R. G. Springsteen	Audie Murphy, Darren McGavin, Ruta Lee	Western	Universal
The Candidate	Robert Angus	Mamie Van Doren, June Wilkinson, Ted Knight	Comedy	Independent
Carol for Another Christmas	Joseph L. Mankiewicz	Peter Sellers, Sterling Hayden, Britt Ekland, Robert Shaw, Ben Gazzara, Eva Marie Saint	Drama	made for television
The Carpetbaggers	Edward Dmytryk	George Peppard, Carroll Baker, Alan Ladd, Elizabeth Ashley, Robert Cummings, Martha Hyer, Martin Balsam	Drama	Paramount; based on the novel
The Cavern	Edgar G. Ulmer	John Saxon, Rosanna Schiaffino, Brian Aherne, Larry Hagman	War	20th Century Fox. Co-production.
Cheyenne Autumn	John Ford	Richard Widmark, Carroll Baker, James Stewart, Edward G. Robinson, Arthur Kennedy, Dolores del Río, Sal Mineo	Western	Warner Bros.
Circus World	Henry Hathaway	John Wayne, Rita Hayworth, Claudia Cardinale	Drama	Paramount
The Comedy of Terrors	Jacques Tourneur	Vincent Price, Peter Lorre, Boris Karloff	Horror	AIP
Crack in the World	Andrew Marton	Dana Andrews, Janette Scott, Kieron Moore	Science fiction	Paramount
The Creeping Terror	Arthur J. Nelson	Vic Savage	Science fiction	MST3K
The Curse of the Living Corpse	Del Tenney	Roy Scheider, Margot Hartman	Horror	20th Century Fox

== D-F ==
Title	Director	Cast	Genre	Note
Dark Purpose	George Marshall	Shirley Jones, George Sanders	Drama	Universal
Dead Ringer	Paul Henreid	Bette Davis, Karl Malden, Peter Lawford	Horror	Warner Bros. Davis in two roles
Dear Heart	Delbert Mann	Glenn Ford, Geraldine Page, Angela Lansbury	Comedy	Warner Bros.
Diary of a Bachelor	Sandy Howard	William Traylor, Joe Silver, Dagne Crane	Comedy	AIP
The Disorderly Orderly	Frank Tashlin	Jerry Lewis, Susan Oliver, Glenda Farrell	Comedy	Paramount
A Distant Trumpet	Raoul Walsh	Troy Donahue, Suzanne Pleshette	Western	Warner Bros.
Dr. Strangelove or: How I Learned to Stop Worrying and Love the Bomb	Stanley Kubrick	Peter Sellers, George C. Scott, Sterling Hayden, Keenan Wynn, Slim Pickens, James Earl Jones	Comedy	Columbia. 4 Oscar nominations; won 4 BAFTA awards
Dumb Patrol	Gerry Chiniquy	Yosemite Sam	Animated	Warner Bros.
Emil and the Detectives	Peter Tewksbury	Walter Slezak, Roger Mobley, Heinz Schubert	Comedy, Crime	Disney; Co-production with West Germany
Ensign Pulver	Joshua Logan	Robert Walker Jr., Burl Ives, Walter Matthau, Larry Hagman, Peter Marshall, James Coco, Jack Nicholson	Comedy	Warner Bros. Sequel to Mister Roberts
The Eyes of Annie Jones	Reginald LeBorg	Richard Conte, Francesca Annis	Drama	20th Century Fox
Face of the Screaming Werewolf	3 Directors	Lon Chaney Jr.	Horror	Indy
Fail-Safe	Sidney Lumet	Henry Fonda, Walter Matthau, Fritz Weaver, Frank Overton, Dan O'Herlihy, Larry Hagman	Thriller	Columbia; based on the novel;
The Fall of the Roman Empire	Anthony Mann	Sophia Loren, James Mason, Stephen Boyd, Christopher Plummer, Anthony Quayle, Mel Ferrer, Omar Sharif, John Ireland	Epic	Paramount; Golden Globe for Best Original Score
False Hare	Robert McKimson	Bugs Bunny	Animated	Warner Bros.
Fanny Hill	Russ Meyer	Miriam Hopkins, Letícia Román, Karin Evans	Romance	Independent; Co-production with West Germany
Fate Is the Hunter	Ralph Nelson	Glenn Ford, Rod Taylor, Nancy Kwan, Suzanne Pleshette, Constance Towers, Jane Russell	Drama	20th Century Fox. From Ernest K. Gann book
Father Goose	Ralph Nelson	Cary Grant, Leslie Caron, Trevor Howard	Romantic comedy	Universal; won Oscar for screenplay
Firelight	Steven Spielberg		Short	
The Flesh Eaters	Jack Curtis	Martin Kosleck, Ira Lewis	Horror	Independent
Flight from Ashiya	Michael Anderson	Yul Brynner, Richard Widmark, George Chakiris	War	United Artists; Co-production with Japan
Flight to Fury	Monte Hellman	Jack Nicholson, Dewey Martin	Drama	Independent
Flipper's New Adventure	Leon Benson	Luke Halpin, Francesca Annis, Pamela Franklin	Family	MGM. Based on TV series
For Those Who Think Young	Leslie H. Martinson	Pamela Tiffin, James Darren, Bob Denver, Nancy Sinatra, Tina Louise, Ellen Burstyn	Comedy	United Artists

== G-H ==
Title	Director	Cast	Genre	Note
Get Yourself a College Girl	Sidney Miller	Mary Ann Mobley, Chad Everett, Nancy Sinatra	Comedy	MGM
A Global Affair	Jack Arnold	Bob Hope, Michèle Mercier, Yvonne De Carlo	Comedy	MGM
The Golden Head	Richard Thorpe	George Sanders, Buddy Hackett, Jess Conrad	Comedy	MGM
Goldfinger	Guy Hamilton	Sean Connery, Honor Blackman, Gert Frobe	Spy	United Artists
Good Neighbor Sam	David Swift	Jack Lemmon, Romy Schneider, Edward G. Robinson	Comedy	Columbia
Goodbye Charlie	Vincente Minnelli	Tony Curtis, Debbie Reynolds, Pat Boone	Comedy	20th Century Fox
Gunfighters of Casa Grande	Roy Rowland	Alex Nicol, Jorge Mistral	Western	MGM
Hag in a Black Leather Jacket	John Waters		Short film	
A Hard Day's Night	Richard Lester	John Lennon, Paul McCartney, George Harrison, Ringo Starr	Musical comedy	United Artists
He Rides Tall	R. G. Springsteen	Tony Young, Dan Duryea, Jo Morrow	Western	Universal
Hey There, It's Yogi Bear!	Joseph Barbera and William Hanna	Yogi Bear	Animated feature	Columbia
Honeymoon Hotel	Henry Levin	Robert Goulet, Robert Morse, Nancy Kwan, Jill St. John, Elsa Lanchester, Anne Helm	Comedy	MGM
The Horror of Party Beach	Del Tenney	John Scott, Alice Lyon	Horror	20th Century Fox
A House Is Not a Home	Russell Rouse	Shelley Winters, Robert Taylor, Cesar Romero, Broderick Crawford, Kaye Ballard	Drama	Embassy
Hush… Hush, Sweet Charlotte	Robert Aldrich	Bette Davis, Olivia de Havilland, Joseph Cotten, Agnes Moorehead, Mary Astor, George Kennedy	Horror	20th Century Fox; 7 Oscar nominations; Astor's final film

== I-K ==
Title	Director	Cast	Genre	Note
I'd Rather Be Rich	Jack Smight	Sandra Dee, Robert Goulet, Andy Williams	Comedy	Universal
The Incredible Mr. Limpet	Arthur Lubin	Don Knotts, Jack Weston, Carole Cook	Comedy	Warner Bros.
The Incredibly Strange Creatures Who Stopped Living and Became Mixed-Up Zombies	Ray Dennis Steckler	Ray Dennis Steckler	Horror musical	MST3K
Invitation to a Gunfighter	Richard Wilson	Yul Brynner, Janice Rule, George Segal	Western	United Artists
Is There a Doctor in the Mouse?	Chuck Jones		Animated	MGM
Island of the Blue Dolphins	James B. Clark	Celia Kaye, Carlos Romero	Drama	Universal
It's Not Just You, Murray!	Martin Scorsese		Short	
The Killers	Don Siegel	Lee Marvin, Angie Dickinson, John Cassavetes, Ronald Reagan	Crime drama	Reagan's final film role. Universal Pictures; Remake of 1946 film
Kiss Me Quick!	Peter Perry	Frank Coe	Sci-fi	
Kiss Me, Stupid	Billy Wilder	Dean Martin, Kim Novak, Ray Walston, Cliff Osmond, Felicia Farr	Comedy	United Artists
Kisses for My President	Curtis Bernhardt	Polly Bergen, Fred MacMurray	Comedy	Warner Bros.
Kissin' Cousins	Gene Nelson	Elvis Presley, Arthur O'Connell, Glenda Farrell, Jack Albertson, Yvonne Craig	Musical	MGM
Kitten with a Whip	Douglas Heyes	Ann-Margret, John Forsythe	Crime drama	Universal

== L-Q ==
Title	Director	Cast	Genre	Note
Lady in a Cage	Walter Grauman	Olivia de Havilland, James Caan, Jennifer Billingsley	Thriller	Paramount
The Last Man on Earth	Ubaldo Ragona; Sidney Salkow	Vincent Price, Franca Bettoia, Emma Danieli, Giacomo Rossi-Stuart	Science fiction	A.I.P.
Law of the Lawless	William F. Claxton	Dale Robertson, Yvonne De Carlo	Western	Paramount
Lilith	Robert Rossen	Warren Beatty, Jean Seberg, Peter Fonda	Drama	Columbia
The Lively Set	Jack Arnold	James Darren, Pamela Tiffin, Doug McClure	Sports	Universal
Looking for Love	Don Weis	Connie Francis, Paula Prentiss, Johnny Carson	Musical	MGM
Lorna	Russ Meyer	Lorna Maitland, Althea Currier	Sexploitation	Independent
Mail Order Bride	Burt Kennedy	Buddy Ebsen, Keir Dullea, Lois Nettleton	Western	MGM
Man in the Middle	Guy Hamilton	Robert Mitchum, France Nuyen	Drama	20th Century Fox; based on Howard Fast book
Man's Favorite Sport?	Howard Hawks	Rock Hudson, Paula Prentiss, Maria Perschy	Comedy	Universal
Marnie	Alfred Hitchcock	Sean Connery, Tippi Hedren, Diane Baker	Suspense	Universal
Mary Poppins	Robert Stevenson	Julie Andrews, Dick Van Dyke, David Tomlinson, Hermione Baddeley, Elsa Lanchester, Glynis Johns, Karen Dotrice, Matthew Garber, Ed Wynn	Musical	Disney; won 5 Oscars; based on P. L. Travers book
The Masque of the Red Death	Roger Corman	Vincent Price, Hazel Court	Horror	A.I.P.
McHale's Navy	Edward Montagne	Ernest Borgnine, Tim Conway, Joe Flynn	Comedy	Universal; based on TV series
The Misadventures of Merlin Jones	Robert Stevenson	Annette Funicello, Tommy Kirk	Comedy	Disney; sequel in 1965
Monstrosity	Joseph V. Mascelli	Marjorie Eaton	Science fiction	MST3K
The Moon-Spinners	James Neilson	Hayley Mills, Eli Wallach, Pola Negri	Family	Disney
Muscle Beach Party	William Asher	Annette Funicello, Frankie Avalon	Comedy	A.I.P.
My Fair Lady	George Cukor	Audrey Hepburn, Rex Harrison, Wilfrid Hyde-White, Stanley Holloway	Musical	Warner Bros. Based on Pygmalion; won 8 Academy Awards
The Naked Kiss	Samuel Fuller	Constance Towers, Anthony Eisley	Neo-noir	United Artists
The Nasty Rabbit	James Landis	Michael Terr, Arch Hall Sr.	Spy	Fairway International Pictures
The New Interns	John Rich	Michael Callan, Dean Jones, Telly Savalas, Barbara Eden, Inger Stevens, George Segal	Drama	Columbia. Sequel to The Interns
The Night of the Iguana	John Huston	Richard Burton, Ava Gardner, Deborah Kerr, Sue Lyon, Grayson Hall	Drama	MGM. Tennessee Williams play; 4 Oscar nominations
The Night Walker	William Castle	Robert Taylor, Barbara Stanwyck, Lloyd Bochner	Thriller	Universal. Screenplay by Robert Bloch
Nothing But a Man	Michael Roemer	Ivan Dixon, Yaphet Kotto	Drama	Independent
One Potato, Two Potato	Larry Peerce	Barbara Barrie, Bernie Hamilton	Drama	Best Actress award at Cannes for Barrie
The Outrage	Martin Ritt	Paul Newman, Laurence Harvey, Edward G. Robinson, Claire Bloom	Western	MGM. Based on Rashomon
Pajama Party	Don Weis	Annette Funicello, Tommy Kirk	Comedy	A.I.P.
Paris When It Sizzles	Richard Quine	Audrey Hepburn, William Holden	Romance	Paramount
The Patsy	Jerry Lewis	Jerry Lewis, Ina Balin, Everett Sloane, Phil Harris	Comedy	Paramount. Final film of Peter Lorre
The Pawnbroker	Sidney Lumet	Rod Steiger, Geraldine Fitzgerald, Brock Peters	Drama	Allied Artists. BAFTA award, Oscar nomination for Steiger
The Pleasure Seekers	Jean Negulesco	Ann-Margret, Pamela Tiffin, Carol Lynley	Romance	20th Century Fox
Point of Order	Emile de Antonio		Documentary	
Quick, Before It Melts	Delbert Mann	Robert Morse, George Maharis, Anjanette Comer	Comedy	MGM
The Quick Gun	Sidney Salkow	Audie Murphy Merry Anders, Ted de Corsia	Western	Columbia
Quick, Let's Get Married	William Dieterle	Ginger Rogers, Ray Milland, Barbara Eden	Comedy	Independent. Unreleased until 1971

== R-V ==
Title	Director	Cast	Genre	Note
Racing Fever	William Grefé	Joe Morrison, Charles G. Martin, Barbara Biggart	Drama	Allied Artists
Raiders from Beneath the Sea	Maury Dexter	Ken Scott, Merry Anders	Adventure	20th Century Fox
Rhino!	Ivan Tors	Robert Culp, Harry Guardino, Shirley Eaton	Adventure	MGM
Ride the Wild Surf	Don Taylor	Fabian, Shelley Fabares, Tab Hunter	Romance	Columbia
Rio Conchos	Gordon Douglas	Stuart Whitman, Richard Boone, Tony Franciosa, Edmond O'Brien, Jim Brown	Western	20th Century Fox
Robin and the 7 Hoods	Gordon Douglas	Frank Sinatra, Dean Martin, Sammy Davis Jr., Barbara Rush, Peter Falk, Bing Crosby	Musical	Warner Bros.
Robinson Crusoe on Mars	Byron Haskin	Adam West, Victor Lundin	Science fiction	Paramount
Roustabout	John Rich	Elvis Presley, Barbara Stanwyck, Joan Freeman, Leif Erickson, Jack Albertson, Sue Ane Langdon, Pat Buttram	Musical	Paramount
Santa Claus Conquers the Martians	Nicholas Webster	John Call, Pia Zadora	Science fiction	Embassy; MST3K
The Secret Door	Gilbert Kay	Robert Hutton, Sandra Dorne, Peter Illing	War	Allied Artists
The Secret Invasion	Roger Corman	Stewart Granger, Raf Vallone, Mickey Rooney	War	United Artists
Send Me No Flowers	Norman Jewison	Rock Hudson, Doris Day, Tony Randall	Comedy	Universal
Seven Days in May	John Frankenheimer	Kirk Douglas, Burt Lancaster, Fredric March, Ava Gardner, Edmond O'Brien, Martin Balsam	Drama	Paramount; script by Rod Serling; 2 Oscar nominations
Sex and the College Girl	Joseph Adler	Charles Grodin, Julie Sommars, Valora Noland	Comedy	Independent
Sex and the Single Girl	Richard Quine	Tony Curtis, Natalie Wood, Henry Fonda, Mel Ferrer	Comedy	Warner Bros.; based on a book by Helen Gurley Brown
Shell Shock	John Hayes	Beach Dickerson, Dolores Faith	War	Independent
Shock Treatment	Denis Sanders	Lauren Bacall, Stuart Whitman	Drama	20th Century Fox
Signpost to Murder	George Englund	Joanne Woodward, Stuart Whitman	Drama	MGM
A Shot in the Dark	Blake Edwards	Peter Sellers, Elke Sommer, George Sanders	Comedy	United Artists. Sequel to The Pink Panther
Sleep	Andy Warhol	John Giorno	Avant-garde	
Stage to Thunder Rock	William F. Claxton	Barry Sullivan, Marilyn Maxwell, John Agar	Western	Paramount
The Starfighters	Will Zens	Bob Dorman, Shirley Olmstead	War	Independent
Strait-Jacket	William Castle	Joan Crawford, Diane Baker, George Kennedy	Thriller	Columbia
The Strangler	Burt Topper	Victor Buono, David McLean	Thriller	Allied Artists
Surf Party	Maury Dexter	Patricia Morrow, Bobby Vinton	Musical	20th Century Fox
Taggart	R. G. Springsteen	Tony Young, Dan Duryea, Dick Foran, Elsa Cárdenas, Jean Hale	Western	Universal
Teen-Age Strangler	Ben Parker	Bill Bloom, John Ensign, Jo Canterbury, John Humphreys	Science fiction	MST3K
Terror in the City	Allen Baron	Lee Grant, Richard Bray, Michael Higgins	Drama	Allied Artists
The Thin Red Line	Andrew Marton	Keir Dullea, Jack Warden, Kieron Moore	War	Allied Artists
The Three Lives of Thomasina	Don Chaffey	Patrick McGoohan, Karen Dotrice	Family	
Those Calloways	Norman Tokar	Brian Keith, Vera Miles, Brandon deWilde, Walter Brennan, Ed Wynn, Linda Evans	Drama	Disney
A Tiger Walks	Norman Tokar	Brian Keith, Vera Miles, Pamela Franklin, Edward Andrews, Frank Aletter, Jack Albertson, Sabu	Family	Disney; Sabu's final film
The Time Travelers	Ib Melchior	Preston Foster, Merry Anders	Science fiction	AIP
To Trap a Spy	Don Medford	Robert Vaughn, David McCallum	Drama	MGM; pilot of TV series
Topkapi	Jules Dassin	Melina Mercouri, Peter Ustinov, Maximilian Schell	Crime	United Artists; Academy Award for Ustinov
The Train	John Frankenheimer	Burt Lancaster, Paul Scofield, Jeanne Moreau	War drama	United Artists
Two Thousand Maniacs!	H. G. Lewis	Connie Mason	Horror	
Under Age	Larry Buchanan	Annabelle Weenick, Judy Adler	Drama	A.I.P.
The Unsinkable Molly Brown	Charles Walters	Debbie Reynolds, Harve Presnell, Jack Kruschen, Ed Begley	Musical	MGM; based on Broadway show; 6 Oscar nominations
The Visit	Bernhard Wicki	Ingrid Bergman, Anthony Quinn, Irina Demick	Drama	Fox
Viva Las Vegas	George Sidney	Elvis Presley, Ann-Margret, Cesare Danova, Jack Carter, William Demarest	Musical	MGM

== W-Z ==
Title	Director	Cast	Genre	Note
What a Way to Go!	J. Lee Thompson	Shirley MacLaine, Dean Martin, Paul Newman, Robert Mitchum, Robert Cummings, Dick Van Dyke, Gene Kelly	Comedy	20th Century Fox; nominated for 2 Academy Awards
Wheel of Fire	Julio Coll	Barry Sullivan, Martha Hyer, Soledad Miranda	Horror	AIP
Where Love Has Gone	Edward Dmytryk	Susan Hayward, Bette Davis, Joey Heatherton	Drama	MGM; based on a novel by Harold Robbins
Wild and Wonderful	Michael Anderson	Tony Curtis, Christine Kaufmann	Romance	Universal
The World of Henry Orient	George Roy Hill	Peter Sellers, Paula Prentiss, Angela Lansbury, Phyllis Thaxter, Tom Bosley	Comedy	United Artists; based on a novel by Nora Johnson
A Yank in Viet-Nam	Marshall Thompson	Marshall Thompson, Enrique Magalona	War	Allied Artists
Youngblood Hawke	Delmer Daves	James Franciscus, Suzanne Pleshette, Eva Gabor, Geneviève Page, Mary Astor	Drama	Warner Bros.; based on a novel by Herman Wouk
The Young Lovers	Samuel Goldwyn Jr.	Peter Fonda, Sharon Hugueny, Deborah Walley	Drama	MGM
Your Cheatin' Heart	Gene Nelson	George Hamilton, Susan Oliver, Red Buttons	Musical, biography	MGM; bio of singer Hank Williams

== See also ==
- List of 1964 box office number-one films in the United States
- 1964 in the United States
