= Nick Stabile =

American television actor

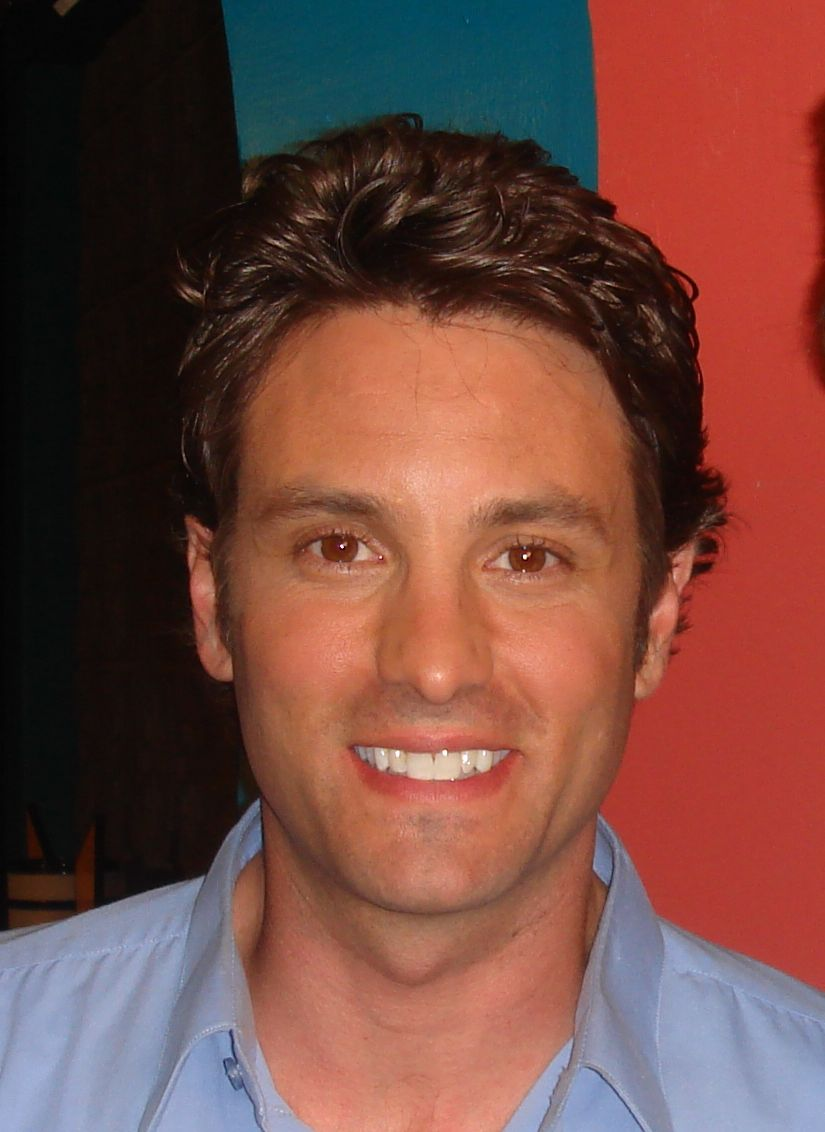
- Stabile in 2007
- Born: March 4, 1971 (age 55); Wheat Ridge, Colorado
- Education: Colorado State University
- Occupations: Television actor, film actor, soap opera actor
- Years active: 1995–present
- Spouse: Tricia Small (m. 2006)
- Children: 1

Nick Stabile (born March 4, 1971) is an American television and film actor. He is known for playing Jesse Miller in Bride of Chucky.

== Career ==
Stabile played Gabe Capshaw on the show, Saints and Sinners. He is well known for playing the role of Jesse (Katherine Heigl's on-screen boyfriend) in the slasher film Bride of Chucky. He also played Mark Wolper on the now-defunct NBC soap Sunset Beach from the show's premiere in January 1997 until January 1998 when his character was killed off. In 2000, Stabile took on the role of Dennis Wilson in The Beach Boys: An American Family. He played the lead role in Santa, Jr., a film released in 2002. Stabile also portrayed the role of Nicholas Foxworth "Fox" Crane on another NBC soap, Passions on a temporary basis from August to September 2004. During this time, Justin Hartley (the original Fox) was on paternity leave with wife Lindsay Hartley.

He then played Dean Hartman on Days of Our Lives from June 2009 to September 2009. As of 2010, he has made appearances on The Real Housewives of Beverly Hills, notably with Camille Grammer, ex-wife of Kelsey Grammer.

On June 17, 2016, Stabile began portraying Nikolas Cassadine on General Hospital, temporarily filling in for Tyler Christopher

== Personal life ==
In 2006, Stabile married actress Tricia Small. They have a daughter, born in 2008.

== Filmography ==
=== Film ===
Year	Title	Role	Notes
1998	Bride of Chucky	Jesse Miller	Supernatural comedy slasher film directed by Ronny Yu. lead role
2000	Leaving Peoria	Roger	Short film directed and written by Christopher Duddy.
2002	Santa, Jr.	Chris Kringle, Jr	Romantic-comedy/fantasy film directed by Kevin Connor.
2003	Descendant	Deputy John Burns	Horror film/thriller film directed by Kermit Christman and Del Tenney with Kermit co-writing.; Based on The Fall of the House of Usher by Edgar Allan Poe.
2007	Dead Write	Martin	Mystery/thriller film directed by Michael Connell.
2010	Sheltered	Cody	Horror film directed and co-written by Josh Stoddard.
2013	Clown Nose Theory	Wade	Short/comedy film directed and written by Ned Farr.
2014	Telling of the Shoes	Roger	Drama film directed and written by Amanda Goodwin.

=== Television ===
Year	Title	Role	Notes
1997–1998	Sunset Beach	Mark Wolper	Soap opera
2000	The Beach Boys: An American Family	Dennis Wilson	Miniseries directed by Jeff Bleckner.
2001	Neurotic Tendencies	Starring role	Made-for-TV-Movie directed and co-written by Kelsey Grammer.
2001	Popular	Jamie Roth	Episodes: "It's Greek to Me" (S 2:Ep 15); "Fag" (S 2:Ep 16); "Coup" (S 2:Ep 17)
2002	Nancy Drew	Ned Nickerson	Made-for-TV-Movie directed by James Frawley.
2004	Half & Half	Nick Tyrell	Recurring
2004	Passions	Fox Crane	Temporary replacement for Justin Hartley with 14 episodes in total.
2006	CSI: Miami	Damon Slone	Episode: "Double Jeopardy" ( S 4:Ep 18)
2007	Saints & Sinners	Gabe Capshaw	Telenovela based on the 2000 TV Azteca telenovela titled La Calle de las Novias (Brides’ Avenue).
2008	Without a Trace	Bruce Meyer	Episode: "Deja Vu" (S 6:Ep 15)
2009	Saving Grace	Professor Aaron Zeyton	Episode: "But There's Clay" (S 2:Ep 12)
2009	Days of Our Lives	Dean Hartman	Recurring
2016	General Hospital	Nikolas Cassadine	Temporarily filling in for Tyler Christopher.
