= Violent Midnight =

- Trade advertisement
- Directed by: Richard Hilliard
- Screenplay by: Robin Miller; Del Tenney (uncredited)
- Story by: Richard Hilliard
- Produced by: Del Tenney
- Starring: Lee Philips; Shepperd Strudwick; Jean Hale; Lorraine Rogers; Margot Hartman; Kaye Elhardt; Sylvia Miles
- Cinematography: Louis McMahon
- Edited by: Robert Q. Lovett
- Music by: Wilford Holcombe
- Production company: Del Tenney Productions
- Distributed by: Victoria Films
- Release dates: May 22, 1963 (Hartford, Connecticut); December 9, 1964 (Los Angeles)
- Running time: 93 minutes
- Country: United States
- Language: English

Violent Midnight is a 1963 American exploitation slasher film directed by Richard Hilliard and starring Lee Philips, Shepperd Strudwick, and Jean Hale. It focuses on a small New England town plagued by a series of slashing murders focused around a women's college.

The film was initially titled Black Autumn, but released as Violent Midnight, premiering in Hartford, Connecticut in May 1963. It was later re-released under the title Psychomania in 1964.

== Plot ==
Elliot Freeman, a war veteran with a family history of mental illness, becomes a pariah in his small town after his wealthy father suspiciously dies in a hunting accident with Elliot present. As a result, Elliot resides in isolation at his familial manor, and works as a portrait artist. While painting a model, Dolores Martello, Elliot is visited by his attorney, Adrian Benedict. Adrian presents paperwork for Elliot to sign regarding the payment of his sister Lynn's tuition.

Later at the local tavern, Elliot and Dolores's boyfriend Charlie get into a fight. Dolores leaves with Elliot, and in private she professes her love for him, recalling a previous sexual encounter they had six months prior. Elliot declines her, and she responds by telling him she is pregnant with Charlie's child; she threatens to spread rumors that the child is Elliot's. The two argue, and Elliot slaps her when she compares him to his "crazy" father. Later that night, Dolores is viciously stabbed to death by a cloaked figure.

Lynn arrives in town the next day from New York City to transfer to the local women's college. When Elliot brings Lynn to the college, he meets Carol Bishop, an instructor there and an old acquaintance who swiftly takes a liking to him. Meanwhile, police Lieutenant Palmer begins investigating Dolores's murder, questioning Elliot as well as Charlie, who is employed at the college as a handyman. Silvia, one of Charlie's side girlfriends, provides a false alibi for him. Adrian comes to Elliot's aid when police attempt to elicit a false confession from him. Later, while Charlie is working at the college, a female student, Alice St. Clair, makes sexual advances toward him, and the two have sex in a closet.

Lieutenant Palmer attempts to further close in on Elliot as a suspect in Dolores's murder, and Elliot confesses to Carol that he murdered his abusive father, and that Adrian helped get him acquitted. At the tavern that night, Charlie knocks Elliot unconscious before stealing his car to go skinny dipping at a lake with Alice. Silvia angrily witnesses Charlie leave with Alice. At the lake, Charlie admits he cannot swim, and Alice pulls him in the water anyway, resulting in them fighting. He punches her, rendering her unconscious, and subsequently drags her to the shore before fleeing in his car. When Alice regains consciousness, she is greeted by a cloaked figure who slashes her to death.

After news of Alice's murder is made public, Silvia becomes convinced Charlie murdered her, as well as Dolores. She calls Lieutenant Palmer and confesses she lied about Charlie's alibi, but before she can finish the call, Charlie attacks her, ripping out her earrings and beating her before fleeing on his motorcycle. A police chase ensues, but Charlie is apprehended. Elliot returns home and receives a phone call from Carol, but it is cut short when he is taken hostage by Adrian and his brutish chauffeur, Max, who are attempting to escort him to a mental institution. Carol arrives moments after they depart, and Elliot jumps from the moving car, managing to evade them by hiding in the woods. Searching for Elliot, Carol enters his mansion, followed by Adrian moments later.

In an upstairs room, Carol is confronted by the cloaked figure who attempts to stab her, but the attack is thwarted by Adrian and Elliot. Elliot chases after the assailant, who is revealed to be Lynn. Lynn crazedly explains that she committed the murders as she felt Elliot's attention was being taken away from her; she arrived in town the day before Dolores's murder, killed her, and then later mistakenly murdered Alice after seeing Elliot's car parked at the lake. She also admits to having fired the shot that killed their father, not Elliot. Later, with Lynn incarcerated, Elliot and Carol are able to reside happily.

== Cast ==
- Lee Philips as Elliot Freeman
- Shepperd Strudwick as Adrian Benedict
- Jean Hale as Carol Bishop
- Lorraine Rogers as Alice St. Clair
- Dick Van Patten as Police Lt. Palmer
- Sheila Forbes as Janet "Lolita" Terhune
- James Farentino as Charlie Perone
- Kaye Elhardt as Dolores Martello
- Sylvia Miles as Silvia Finelli (as Silvia Miles)
- Margot Hartman as Lynn Freeman
- Day Tuttle as Arthur Melbourne
- Mike O'Dowd as Max, Adrian's Chauffeur
- Mike Keene as Police Inspector Grey

== Production ==
In writing the screenplay, Del Tenney was inspired by the case of Paula Jean Welden, a student at Bennington College who disappeared while Tenney's wife, Margot Hartman, was attending there. Filming for Violent Midnight took place in Stamford, Connecticut. Additional reshoots of sex scenes between James Farentino and Lorraine Rogers's characters was completed after principal photography and edited into the final cut.

Actress Candace Hilligoss was offered a role in the film, but turned it down in favor of a role in Carnival of Souls.

== Release ==
Violent Midnight had its world premiere at the E. M. Loew's theater in Hartford, Connecticut on May 22, 1963. It opened in Boston on July 31, 1963. It was later re-released under the title Psychomania in New York City on February 5, 1964, and grossed $34,200 during its first two weeks. It was re-released in Los Angeles under this title on December 9, 1964.

As part of a double bill with Monstrosity, it reached the top ten of the highest-grossing films in Variety per its gross, rather than the survey the magazine used.

=== Censorship ===
In some U.S. cities, such as Salina, Kansas, projectionists manually cut footage from the film which contained nudity, particularly that of Kaye Elhardt.

=== Critical response ===
The New York Daily News lambasted the film for its depiction of sexuality and violence, with a review noting: "The quota of sexual abnormals is high, and their activities are grossly delineated on screen... The film's potential as a likely mystery is abnegated by trickery, perversion and sensationalism." Kevin Thomas of the Los Angeles Times criticized the film for focusing more on the female students of the women's college than on Phillips's character of Elliot, as well as for its "awkward editing, poor sound and distracting music." Thomas also noted the sexuality depicted in the film as "gratuitous," but conceded "several first-rate performances [and] respectable camera work that makes the most of its rural setting."

Mark Deming of AllMovie awarded the film one and a half out of five stars, deeming it "a stark but interesting low-budget thriller." Glenn Erickson's review published in DVD Talk notes: "Tenney's film finds a sex angle by populating the film with a beautiful artist's model and a girls' school overflowing with man-crazy students. Add a Psycho- inspired mix of mental aberration and gory killing, and Violent Midnight is a progressive exploitation show with multiple promotional handles."

=== Home media ===
Dark Sky Films released Violent Midnight on DVD on March 28, 2006. This release features an audio commentary with writer and producer Del Tenney.
