= Kaye Elhardt =

American actress (1935–2004)

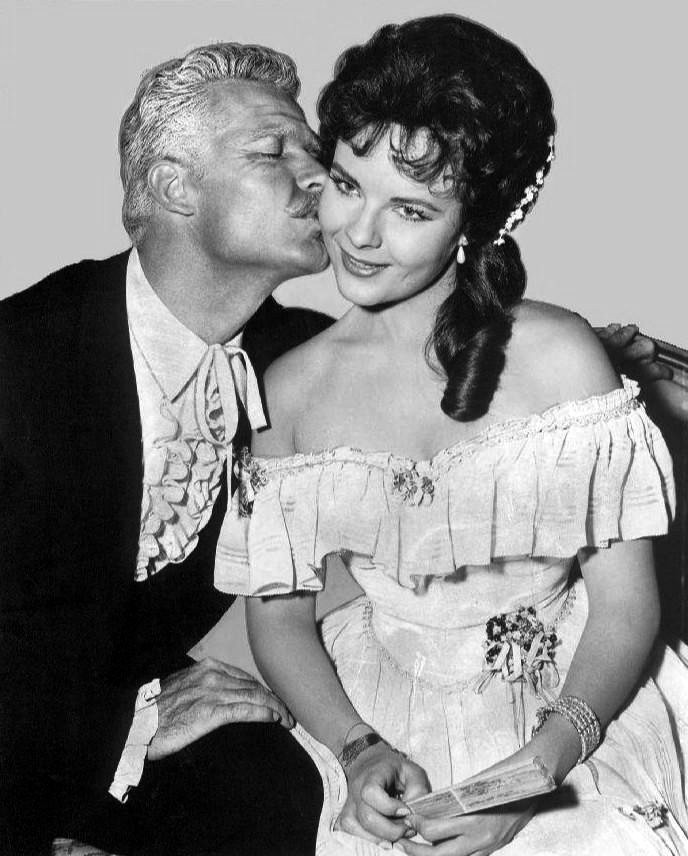
- James Garner as "Pappy" Maverick and Kaye Elhardt in 1959
- Born: Kaye Valerie Elhardt; August 28, 1935; Los Angeles, California, U.S.
- Died: September 1, 2004 (aged 69); Los Angeles, California, U.S.
- Resting place: Hollywood Forever Cemetery
- Other name: Kay Elhardt
- Education: Marymount College
- Occupation: Actress
- Years active: 1956–1977
- Spouse: George A. Cariker (1975; divorced)
- Children: 1

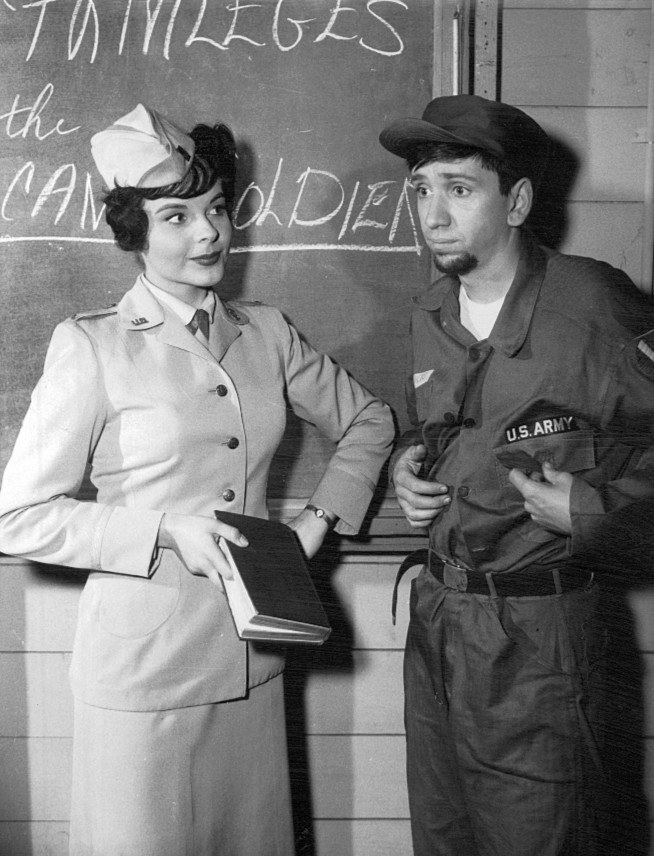
Kaye Elhardt and Bob Denver in TV's The Many Loves of Dobie Gillis (1961)

Kaye Elhardt (August 28, 1935 – September 1, 2004) was an American actress with dozens of television appearances in a career spanning from 1956 to 1977. She was known for her many roles in Warner Brothers (WB) television series, including 77 Sunset Strip, Hawaiian Eye, Surfside 6, Maverick, Bourbon Street Beat, Colt .45, and Bronco, but also did multiple episodes of Perry Mason and My Three Sons.

== Early life ==
Kaye Valerie Elhardt was born in Los Angeles, the only child of Leonard Elhardt, a salesman and real estate developer from Minnesota, and Faye Fenusz Elhardt from Wyoming. During the summer of 1951 she took part in a city-sponsored youth chorus program. She studied dramatics at Marymount College in Westwood, California.

== Early career ==
During her junior year she appeared in her first professional stage role for the musical High Button Shoes. Her first starring stage role came as she entered her senior year, when she played "Laurey Williams" in Green Grow the Lilacs. The production included some original songs by Rod McKuen. Elhardt performed six songs, and was judged by the Los Angeles Times reviewer "A winsome and spirited young actress", who "displayed dramatic talent and a voice of appealing caliber". Elhardt's professional voice coach was Harold Hurlbut.

Her screen career began with bit parts on television, starting with West Point during December 1956. She did episodes of three shows, then had the female lead in another musical, New England Summer in August 1957. She again received high marks for this production from the Los Angeles Times: "Kaye Elhardt, possessor of a lovely lyric voice... not only sings with taste and charm, but she is an unusually talented actress".

== Career ==
Elhardt played Peaches in the 1958 ABC comedy Love That Jill. She also made more than 40 appearances on television series. Among her three guest appearances on Perry Mason with Raymond Burr, she played defendant Ginny Talbot in the 1962 episode, "The Case of the Borrowed Baby."

She was featured on Family Affair; Highway Patrol with Broderick Crawford; Wagon Train with Ward Bond; Sea Hunt with Lloyd Bridges; seven different roles in 77 Sunset Strip with Efrem Zimbalist, Jr.; Bourbon Street Beat with Andrew Duggan, Richard Long, and Van Williams; Bat Masterson with Gene Barry; My Three Sons with Fred MacMurray; The Tab Hunter Show with Tab Hunter; Surfside Six with Troy Donahue and Van Williams; Hawaiian Eye with Robert Conrad; Bronco; Yancy Derringer with Jock Mahoney; Colt .45; Philip Marlowe with Philip Carey; and more than a score of others.

== Personal life ==
All through college and most of her acting career, Elhardt lived with her parents in the Kentner Canyon area, north of Sunset Boulevard in Brentwood, Los Angeles. Her family had real estate interests in Shasta County, California and Elhardt appears to have become a realtor after show business.

Elhardt married George A. Cariker in Los Angeles on April 20, 1975. They were divorced six months later.

== Stage performances ==
Listed by year of first performance (excluding student performances)
Year	Play	Role	Venue	Notes
1956	High Button Shoes	Singing Girl	Carthay Circle Theatre	Elhardt's first professional stage credit starred Jack Haley Jr.
1956	Green Grow the Lilacs	Laurey Williams	Morgan Theater	Elhardt's first starring role was produced by the Santa Monica Theater Guild.
1957	New England Summer	Emily Webb	Morgan Theater	Produced by the Santa Monica Theater Guild, Elhardt again had the female lead in this musical.
1958	Carousel	Julie Jordan	Municipal Auditorium	Elhardt starred in this production by the Singer's Workshop of Long Beach, California.
1965	The Three Musketeers		Roxbury Memorial Park	Open air musical comedy production by Equity Library Theatre West.

== Filmography ==
Film (by year of first release)
Year	Title	Role	Notes
1958	Senior Prom	Girl in Yellow	Uncredited
1959	The Crimson Kimono	Nun	Uncredited
1959	Stump Run	Leatha Gaskin	Filmed near Eugene, Oregon during May 1959 by an independent producer and local backers.
1963	Violent Midnight (Note: The working title was The Death Watcher.)	Delores Martello	Filmed on location in Connecticut in late summer 1961.
1965	Dr. Goldfoot and the Bikini Machine	Girl in Nightclub	
1966	The Navy vs. the Night Monsters	Diane	
1966	Any Wednesday	Cecile	Uncredited
1970	Airport	Kay Hart	Uncredited
1977	The Billion Dollar Hobo	Miss Evans	

Television (in original broadcast order, excluding commercials)
Year	Series	Episode	Role	Notes
1956	West Point	Double Reverse	Nancy's Trading Partner	Her first screen credit was a small part in this Gene Roddenberry teleplay.
1957	Matinee Theater	Unknown Episode		Elhardt's performance is known only from a newspaper blurb by her voice coach.
1957	Dr. Christian	Hit and Run	Mary Haven	
1957	Fireside Theatre	Contact		
1957	Telephone Time	I Get Along... (Note: The full episode title was "I Get Along Very Well Without You".)	Betty	Elhardt plays a co-ed at Indiana; with Hoagy Carmichael and Walter Winchell.
1958	Tombstone Territory	The Rebels' Last Charge		Richard Reeves and Elhardt were the guest stars in this episode.
1958	The Millionaire	The Peter Barkley Story	Dora	
1958	Love That Jill	Tonight's the Night	Peaches	Elhardt was only in the first episode of this series.
1958	Highway Patrol	Insulin	Joan Haggard	
1958	Sea Hunt	Gold Below	Betty	
1958	Harbor Command	Hostage	Ellen Leeds	
1958	The Rough Riders	The Maccabites	Naomi	
1959	Yancy Derringer	Outlaw at Liberty	Sally Snow	
1959	77 Sunset Strip	Downbeat	April Myford	The first of eight episodes Elhardt would do on this WB show.
1959	Rescue 8	One More Step	Melinda Stark	Actress (Elhardt) falls off of a theater catwalk and is left dangling high above stage.
1959	Maverick	Pappy	Josephine St. Cloud	
1959	77 Sunset Strip	Six Superior Skirts	Wanda Hill	Elhardt sits in on joint jam session with the Mary Kaye and Frankie Ortega Trios.
1959	Colt .45	Yellow Terror	Lucie	Elhardt is miscast as a dance hall girl.
1959	General Electric Theater	Platinum on the Rocks	Lenore Martin	George Burns stars as a jewel thief after Elhardt's jewelry.
1959	Bourbon Street Beat	Light Touch of Terror	Alise Bonvillan	A psychotic killer is after Elhardt.
1959	Philip Marlowe	Hit and Run	Gloria Fielding	
1960	Johnny Midnight	The Villain of the Piece	Paula Shafto	
1960	77 Sunset Strip	The Starlet	Kay Donnelly	Elhardt plays an aspiring actress whose suicide arouses suspicion.
1960	Tightrope!	First Time Out	Betty Carlson	
1960	Tombstone Territory	Young Killer	Mary Rice	
1960	The Donna Reed Show	The First Time We Met	Pat Archer	Elhardt plays a nurse whom Donna Reed matches with a doctor (Bob Hastings).
1960	Wagon Train	The Luke Grant Story	Sue	
1960	Bat Masterson	Blood on the Money	Eva Rogers	
1960	The Tab Hunter Show	Be My Guest	Cynthia	
1960	77 Sunset Strip	The Laurel Canyon Caper	Belinda Lane	Elhardt sings on camera but her voice was dubbed over by Eileen Wilson.
1960	Surfside 6	Bride and Seek	Lois Culver	Grant Williams and Elhardt made this WB detective show...
1960	Hawaiian Eye	Baker's Half Dozen	Dody Baker	...about the same time they did this other WB detective show.
1961	Surfside 6	Invitation to a Party	Virginia Barker	
1961	77 Sunset Strip	Vamp Until Ready	Julie Lee	
1961	The Many Loves of Dobie Gillis	The Battle of Maynard's Beard	Lt. Portia Potter	
1961	Perry Mason	The Case of the Duplicate Daughter	Muriell Gilman	
1961	The Aquanauts	The Landslide Adventure	Nancy Wilson	
1961	Surfside 6	The Wedding Guest	Millie Owens	
1961	Bronco	The Cousin from Atlanta	Gail Summers	
1961	77 Sunset Strip	The Deadly Solo	Irene McCallum	
1962	My Three Sons	The Girls Next Door	Ann Stoeffer	Elhardt plays an airline stewardess.
1962	Perry Mason	The Case of the Borrowed Baby	Ginny Talbot	Elhardt is the defendant accused of murder.
1962	Hawaiian Eye	Scene of the Crime	Gloria Matthews	Elhardt is a reporter on a boar-hunting trek on Kauai.
1962	The Comedy Spot	Octavious and Me	Jill Drake	Thirty-minute unsold pilot broadcast on a summer fill-in show.
1962	Perry Mason	The Case of the Lurid Letter	Doris Wilson	
1963	77 Sunset Strip	Walk Among Tigers	Martha Emerson	
1964	77 Sunset Strip	Not Such a Simple Knot	Paula Barnes	Elhardt is older sister to math genius.
1965	My Three Sons	Steve and the Computer	Miss Baxter	
1966	My Three Sons	Call Her Max	Katherine	
1966	Hank	Operation Matriculation	Miss Treadwell	
1967	My Three Sons	The Good Earth	Receptionist	
1968	My Three Sons	My Wife, the Waitress	Sharon	
1968	Family Affair	A Man's Place	Miss Martin	
1969	Family Affair	The Stowaway	Toni	
