= Wade Reynolds =

Wade Reynolds (born Charles Elwood Reynolds; June 5, 1929 – October 3, 2011) was a self-taught realist painter, Reynolds was best known for his figurative paintings often classified as California School of Light. He was commissioned to portray California governor George Deukmejian for his official state portrait. He is also known for his portraits of costume designer Noel Taylor and actress Agnes Moorehead.

== Biography ==
Reynolds was born in Jasper, New York, in 1929. He began his professional art career in New York City where he was hired in 1958 to create the artwork depicted in the film The World of Suzie Wong. From 1959 on, Reynolds resided in California, living in Newport Beach, Oceanside and San Francisco. He also painted in the Los Angeles area.

Reynolds' work appeared in museums and galleries in San Francisco, Santa Barbara, and New York, Newport Beach and Santa Fe, New Mexico. Artist David Wheeler, with who Reynolds once shared a studio, referred to him as “the West Coast’s equivalent to Andrew Wyeth.”

He was an instructor at the Art Institute of Southern California (now the Laguna College of Art and Design) and at the Academy of Art (now the Academy of Art University) in San Francisco. He influenced students including Julio Reyes, Candice Bohanon, and Alia El-Bermani.

Reynolds died after a long bout with cancer.
