= The Del-Aires =

American rock band

The Del-Aires were a Paterson, New Jersey rock band of the 1960s. They were featured as themselves in Del Tenney's 1964 B-movie beach party film, The Horror of Party Beach. For the film, Gary Robert Jones and Ronnie Linares wrote one song together, "Drag", and one song each: "Just Wigglin' 'n' Wobblin'" (Jones) and "Elaine" (Linares). The Del-Aires performed all six songs in the film, which included "Joy Ride", "The Zombie Stomp" and "You Are Not a Summer Love." Following his stint with the Del-Aires, saxophonist/guitarist/keyboardist Bobby Osborne was a member of the band Gas Mask, perhaps best known for having their first (and only) album, Their First Album, produced by Teo Macero. In 2024, author Rob Errera published Becker Comes Alive: A Rock 'n' Roll Pioneer's True Tale of Music, Murder, and Monsters, which chronicles the life of Del-Aires drummer John Becker.
