= Descendant (2003 film) =

- Directed by: Kermit Christman; Del Tenney
- Written by: Kermit Christman (screenplay); Margot Hartman
- Based on: The Fall of the House of Usher by Edgar Allan Poe
- Starring: Jeremy London; Katherine Heigl; Arie Verveen
- Music by: Tim Wynn
- Release date: June 17, 2003
- Running time: 86 minutes
- Language: English
- Budget: $650,000 (estimated)

Descendant is a 2003 film starring Katherine Heigl and Jeremy London based on the 1839 short story "The Fall of the House of Usher" by Edgar Allan Poe.

== Plot ==
Ethan Poe, a writer living in the shadow of his infamous ancestor, is under deadline to finish his next book. He moves to a small town to concentrate on his novel and meets Anne who falls for the troubled writer. When the shadow of Poe's ghost falls over the two lovers women turn up murdered in Poe-etic fashion. Ethan is the Police's prime suspect. Is Anne next to be murdered? Can she save herself from the dark curse on the Poe family?

== Cast ==
- Jeremy London as Ethan Poe / Frederick Usher
- Katherine Heigl as Ann Hedgerow / Emily Hedgerow
- Nick Stabile as Deputy John Burns
- Arie Verveen as Edgar Allan Poe
- William Katt as Dr. Tom Murray
- Whitney Dylan as Lisa
- Matt Farnsworth as Keifer Hedgerow
- Margot Hartman as Margaret Usher (credited as Margot Hartman Tenney)
- Cheryl Dent as Camille Lane
- Lissa Pallo as Susan Smith
- Marilyn Burns as Dr. White
- Jodi Stevens as Rebecca Dodd
- Jenna Bodnar as Kate
- Craig Patton as The Bartender
- Diane Foster as Vicki
- Amy Lindsay as Dee
