= Eulabelle Moore =

American actress

- Born: 1903
- Died: 1964 (aged 60–61)
- Occupation: Actress
- Known for: Broadway productions, a film

Eulabelle Moore (1903 - 1964) was an American actress who had roles in Broadway productions and in the film The Horror of Party Beach.

== Career ==
Moore had roles in 15 Broadway productions including A Streetcar Named Desire (1950), The Male Animal (1952), and Great Day in the Morning (1962). She was originally part of the cast of The Fundamental George as a maid, but she could not perform because she was ill. Helen Bonfils took over the role, but in blackface. John Gerstad stated, "She never was very good, certainly not comparable with Eulabelle, who is an accomplished comedy actress". Moore has received other positive reception from her Broadway roles. In a review of Danger - Men Working, The Philadelphia Inquirer wrote, "Eulabelle Moore won applause as the janitress who sees all and tells all of the goings-on in an apartment house". Gladys March, in an Asbury Park Press review of Here Today wrote, "And Eulabelle Moore as Gertude, evokes many of the deep belly-laughs from her hearty portrayal of the maid".

Moore also had a role in the 1964 film The Horror of Party Beach. Mark Burger of Yes! Weekly wrote, "In one of the story's most dated aspects, Eulabelle Moore (who died shortly after the film's release) plays Laurel's housekeeper "Eulabelle," whose comic rants about voodoo make for a cringing stereotype – although, to be fair, it's Eulabelle who accidentally figures out how to destroy the creatures."
