= The Horror of Party Beach =

1964 film by Del Tenney

- Theatrical release poster
- Directed by: Del Tenney
- Written by: Richard Hilliard
- Produced by: Del Tenney; Alan V. Iselin
- Starring: John Scott; Alice Lyon; Allen Laurel; Marilyn Clarke
- Cinematography: Richard Hilliard
- Edited by: Leonard De Munde; David Simpson; Gary Youngman
- Distributed by: Twentieth Century Fox
- Release date: June 1, 1964
- Running time: 78 minutes
- Country: United States
- Language: English
- Budget: $50,000 (estimated)

The Horror of Party Beach is a 1964 American horror film in the beach party genre, directed and co-produced by Del Tenney. The film is described as "a take-off on beach parties and musicals", with film critics characterizing it as one of the worst films of all time.

== Plot ==
Near a small East Coast beach town near New York City, a boat dumps a 55-gallon metal drum labeled "Danger Radioactive Waste" into the ocean. The drum opens upon reaching the bottom, releasing its contents upon a sunken ship and a nearby human skeleton. The skeleton is transformed into an aquatic, humanoid monster. The monster immediately ambulates toward the beach, where a dance party featuring The Del-Aires musical group is in progress.

Hank Green, an employee of local scientist Dr. Gavin, attends the beach party with Tina, his girlfriend. They quarrel and Tina leaves him and begins flirting with Mike, the leader of a motorcycle gang, as Hank talks with Dr. Gavin's daughter Elaine. Hank starts a fight with Mike, but ignores Tina afterwards. After also being spurned by Mike, Tina swims to a rock jetty where she is attacked and killed by the monster. Tina's body soon thereafter washes ashore, still covered in blood.

The police enlist Dr. Gavin to help with the investigation of Tina's death, and he proposes Carbon-14 tests as a means to investigate the genetic structure of a tissue sample. Eulabelle, Dr. Gavin's housekeeper, then suggests that "voodoo" is responsible. Elaine confesses to her father her romantic feelings toward Hank, and she later decides to skip a slumber party with her friends. She calls the party and declines the invite. The monster, now joined by additional monsters presumably arising from the same radioactive waste-mediated transformation mechanism, subsequently attacks the slumber party, killing over twenty of the teen girl attendees.

Later, three female travelers, en route to New York, stop at a gas station and ask the best way to get to the city which involves going through a desolate road in the woods by a lake in a quarry. They stop to change a flat tire and smell fish. They are then attacked and killed by the monsters. As Hank and Elaine attend an evening dance party at the beach, one of the monsters stalks two young women who are walking through town after they leave a drugstore. Frustrated when the women are saved when they are picked up by a passing automobile, the monster attacks female mannequins instead on display in a storefront window, in the process severing its arm. Dr. Gavin and Hank study the still-living severed arm. Dr. Gavin characterizes the muscle tissue as "a sea anemone, a species of protozoa." Although they cannot devise a way to kill it, Eulabelle accidentally spills a container of metallic sodium on the arm, which kills it. Dr. Gavin thus realizes a chemical method for destroying the monsters: the application of "plain old sodium."

Two drunken men stumbling through town encounter a dead, mutilated man inside a parked truck. Shocked by what they see, one of the drunks is shortly thereafter attacked and killed by the monsters. Following a montage of additional women being attacked and killed, the police initiate unsuccessful searches for the monsters by tracking the latter's trail of radioactive water.

As Hank drives to New York City to obtain a supply of metallic sodium, Elaine performs her own search for the monsters at a local quarry, near where the female travelers were killed. Upon learning this, Dr. Gavin rushes off to assist Elaine, bringing a small amount of sodium with him. As Elaine is testing the quarry water, which registers as highly radioactive, she notices the emergence of a monster. She manages to avoid an attack by walking away, but she falls and becomes incapacitated by a bloody leg injury. Dr. Gavin arrives at her side and, by tossing sodium, kills an approaching monster in a fiery explosion. As additional monsters approach at a faster speed, Dr. Gavin engages one of them in extended hand-to-hand combat. Hank then arrives with a large supply of sodium, kills the monster that is attacking Dr. Gavin (in the process badly burning Gavin), and, with the assistance of police, destroys the remaining monsters.

The next day, Eulabelle answers the door to Hank who checks on Elaine. She tells him her leg is healing nicely and he informs her her father Dr.Gavin (who suffered burns) is recovering nicely. The two kiss and it is presumed that they start dating.

== Cast ==
- John Scott as Hank Green
- Alice Lyon as Elaine Gavin
- Allan Laurel as Dr. Gavin
- Eulabelle Moore as Eulabelle
- Marilyn Clarke as Tina
- Agustin Mayor as Mike
- Damon Kebroyd as Lt. Wells
- Munroe Wade as television announcer (credited as Monroe Wade)
- Carol Grubman as girl in car
- Dina Harris as girl in car
- Emily Laurel as girl in car
- Sharon Murphy as 1st girl
- Diane Prizio as 2nd girl
- The Del-Aires as band
- Charter Oaks M. C. as motorcycle gang

== Production ==
The Horror of Party Beach was directed by Del Tenney. His career began as an actor, working at the Los Angeles State College, appearing as an extra in films such as Stalag 17 and The Wild One. After moving to New York to act professionally, he worked as an assistant director in exploitation films, including Satan in High Heels. Tenney was approached by producer Alan Iselin, whose family owned drive-in theaters in Albany, New York, to make a double feature for drive-ins. He offered to put up $50,000 and come up with the titles and pressbooks if Tenney would also contribute $50,000. The titles Iselin created were The Curse of the Living Corpse and Invasion of the Zombies. The original scripts for both films were written by Tenney and his wife Margot Hartman. Unlike most beach party movies filmed to that time, The Horror of Party Beach was shot in black and white and on the Atlantic coast, with the primary filming site being the Shippan Point area of Stamford, Connecticut. The biker gang in the film was portrayed by the Charter Oak Motorcycle Club (described as being "affiliated with, but ... a step beneath, the Hells Angels") of Riverside, Connecticut.

The monster costumes were designed by Robert Verberkmoes, a theater set designer, and constructed at Gutzon Borglum's sculpting studio in Stamford. The costume heads sat atop the actors' heads, such that the actor looked through a hole in the costume neck. Two monster costumes were constructed; upon completion, one was found to be too small for the hired stuntman/actor. Production assistant Ruth Glassenberg Freedman had a 16-year-old son, Charles Freedman, who fit perfectly into the small suit, and he was subsequently recruited to portray a monster(s) in the film. The underwater skeleton transformation scene was shot on a stage, with images of tropical fish in an aquarium later superimposed over the dissolving stage shots. Chocolate syrup was used for blood during the monster attack scenes.

The advertising for the double feature of Horror of Party Beach and Living Corpse capitalized on a gimmick first utilized by director William Castle, in which newspaper advertisements included a call-out that stated: "For your protection! We will not permit you to see these shockers unless you agree to release the theater of all responsibility for death by fright!" Theaters were encouraged by the distributor to have patrons sign a "Fright Release" before they took their seats. The trailer for the double feature also included this claim. Although billed in its promotional material as "The First Horror Monster Musical", all the songs heard in the film were presented as either soundtrack music or source music, as opposed to the style of a traditional musical with songs sung by central characters of the story. Ray Dennis Steckler's The Incredibly Strange Creatures Who Stopped Living and Became Mixed-Up Zombies also made the same claim a few months earlier. As a tie-in, a monographic fumetti comic book by Wally Wood and Russ Jones detailing the film's story was released by the Warren Publishing Company under its Famous Films masthead. It has a 35-cent cover price.

Edward Earle Marsh (aka Zebedy Colt) composed the film's soundtrack; Wilfred Holcombe was credited as the musical director. Marsh and Holcombe wrote three songs that were performed in the film: "Joy Ride", "The Zombie Stomp" and "You Are Not a Summer Love". Gary Robert Jones and Ronnie Linares, both of the Del-Aires (a Paterson, New Jersey rock band who play themselves in the film) wrote one song together, "Drag", and one song each individually: "Just Wigglin' 'n' Wobblin'" (Jones) and "Elaine" (Linares). The Del-Aires performed all six songs in the film.

== Reception ==
=== Release ===
The movie was distributed by 20th Century Fox. In 2018, it was released on Blu-ray by Severin Films.

=== Critical response ===
The Horror of Party Beach has received substantial critical attention, and has been recognized by film critics as one of the worst films of all time.

Upon the film's release, a reviewer for The New York Times wrote, "The most to be said for [Tenney] is that he has not stinted on the gore," and a review in Newsweek, which was critical of the musical numbers performed by the Del-Aires, considered it the worst film in the previous twelve months, with the possible exception being Blood Feast. Additional negative commentary on the film has come from Thomas Lisanti in his book Hollywood Surf and Beach Movies: The First Wave, 1959–1969 ("by far the worst of the sixties beach films") and the author Stephen King ("an abysmal little wet fart of a film.") Author and film critic Leonard Maltin awarded the film a "BOMB" rating, calling it "one of the earliest anti-nuclear warning films", but also stated that it failed to get its message across. Film critic Michael Medved included the movie in his books The Fifty Worst Films of All Time and Son of Golden Turkey Awards. The latter book recognized the movie as "The Worst Beach Movie Ever Made". Despite giving it a negative reception, Medved cited the film as the catalyst of his fascination for bad movies and described The Horror of Party Beach as a "good bad movie."

Joe Meyers in the Hearst newspaper blog for the Stamford Advocate wrote upon the death of Del Tenney: "Connecticut had its own Ed Wood, an actor, director and entrepreneur named Del Tenney who made a series of truly awful pictures in the Stamford area during the 1960s, the most notorious of which is Horror of Party Beach, a 1964 drive-in quickie about an atomic mutation that terrorizes Stamford."

Filmink wrote "The film is violent and silly, with a decent number in ‘The Zombie Stomp’, and absolutely worth watching if you like your bad horror flicks, but not if you like beach party films."

== In popular culture ==
The punk band Sloppy Seconds named one of their songs after the movie for their 1989 album Destroyed.

The Horror of Party Beach was featured in an eighth-season (1997) episode of Mystery Science Theater 3000 (MST3K), an American television comedy series. In 2016, Shout! Factory released the MST3K episode as part of the "Volume XXXVII" DVD collection of the series, along with The Human Duplicators, Escape from the Bronx, and Invasion of the Neptune Men. Paul Chaplin stated that the writing team for the show found The Del-Aires to be one of the few bright spots in the movie, and despite their mocking, they thought the group to be a "darn good band."

== See also ==
- The Beach Girls and the Monster
- Humanoids from the Deep
