= The Curse of the Living Corpse =

1964 film

- US film poster
- Directed by: Del Tenney
- Screenplay by: Del Tenney
- Produced by: Del Tenney
- Starring: Helen Warren; Roy Scheider; Margot Hartman
- Cinematography: Richard Hilliard
- Edited by: Gary Youngman; Jack Hirshfeld
- Music by: William Holmes
- Production companies: Deal Films; Iselin-Tenney Productions
- Distributed by: 20th Century Fox
- Release date: 29 April 1964
- Running time: 84 minutes
- Country: United States
- Language: English

The Curse of the Living Corpse is a 1964 American horror film produced, written and directed by Del Tenney. The film is about a series of murders that haunt the family of a man who died leaving extensive instructions in his will to avoid him being buried alive. The film marked the feature film debut of actor Roy Scheider. It was originally co-billed with The Horror of Party Beach (1964). Both movies were filmed in black-and-white in Stamford, Connecticut by Iselin-Tenney Productions, a short-lived production company the director formed with Alan V. Iselin, the owner of a chain of drive-in theaters.

== Plot ==
In 1892 New England, Rufus Sinclair suffers from catalepsy and lives in fear of being pronounced dead and buried alive. To prevent this, he leaves detailed instructions to the family and his staff, but when he is found, his greedy family has him quickly interred, eager to claim his inheritance. Rufus leaves specific instructions on how to be buried, which are violated, and James Benson, the family lawyer, while reading the will, lets them know they will die from what they fear most:

Bruce will have his face disfigured; Rufus's widow, Abigail, will die by fire; his asthmatic and alcoholic son Philip will suffocate; Philip's wife Vivian will drown; the family servant Seth will "join me in my tomb"; and Rufus's nephew Robert will lose that which is most dear to him, his wife Deborah.

Abigail reveals she left a diamond brooch on Rufus's coffin, Bruce, needing the money, and family maid and lover Lettie recover it, though Bruce is perturbed to find it on the floor. He leaves Lettie at the crypt against her wishes, saying they need to return separately—and she is beheaded by a masked killer—seemingly Rufus returned from the grave. He leaves the head to be discovered by Bruce and others on a dinner tray. Bruce vows to stop Rufus while forcing Vivian to help him.

Bruce is maimed in the face by the masked killer—who then drags him to his death behind a horse. Vivian reveals that Lettie was murdered; Seth tells the remaining family members that Bruce's corpse is at the stable. Phillip finds Abigail's diamond pin on Bruce's body, and Abigail runs away in tears. The family lawyer sends Robert into town for the police. Phillip is named the new family patriarch and vows to do his best. Abigail says she's glad Rufus is alive so he can pay for the two murders. Seth feels he's in the clear, until Phillip reminds Seth that he violated the terms of the will and is "one of them now."

The police arrive, and Phillip informs him that the family believes Rufus was buried alive. The lawyer agrees and says that Rufus will now be totally insane. Phillip and the rest of the family give the police Rufus's description, and the police vow to find him. After Abigail has a panic attack, Phillip stays with her on her request, but then ducks out to get a drink, which he shares with one of the policemen. They get drunk, and Phillip tells him that Abigail has a morbid fear of fire. The masked figure later enters Abigail's room, chloroforms her, binds her to the bed—and sets her aflame. The family is unable to save her. The men then search with dogs, leaving Vivian and Deborah at the house.

Seth enters the crypt, apologizing for failing in his task of lighting the torches. He attempts to do so, and is murdered when the figure pulls a sword from the cane, fulfilling the will's threat he would die in the crypt. Deborah convinces Vivian that they should dress up for Phillip and Robert. Phillip and Robert wander from the search party and Robert finds Seth's corpse.

The masked killer knocks out the policeman on guard and then strangles Vivian while she's bathing. Deborah walks in, and the masked killer drags her away to the bog. Robert chases after them. The killer is revealed to be Phillip, upset with his treatment by his father and the rest of the family, the forgotten child. Phillip says he did not wish to kill her, but must now. Robert arrives and the two fight. Robert gains the upper hand, and Phillip sinks into the bog—dying as the will foretold.

Robert and Deborah leave happily. The two policemen decide to share Phillip's remaining booze, while lamenting over his ability to commit all the murders. They discover that the alcohol was merely tea, and that Phillip was not an alcoholic at all, just playing one so he could get away with the crimes.

== Cast ==
- Helen Warren as Abigail Sinclair
- Roy R. Scheider as Philip Sinclair
- Margot Hartman as Vivian Sinclair
- Robert Milli as Bruce Sinclair
- Hugh Franklin as James Benson
- Jane Bruce as cook
- Candace Hilligoss as Deborah Benson
- Dino Narizzano as Robert Harrington
- Linda Donovan as Letty Crews
- J. Frank Lucas as Seth Lucas
- Paul Haney as Constable Barnes
- George Cotton as Constable Winters
- William Blood as minister

== Production ==
In a May 8, 1963 issue of Variety, it was reported that actor Del Tenney and drive-in theater tycoon Alan V. Iselin would begin Iselin-Tenney Productions with two films: The Curse of the Living Corpse and a film that was under development titled Invasion of the Zombies. Candace Hilligoss spoke about her role in the film, stating she was invited by Tenney who was a stage actor and invited her to work on the film. Hilligoss stated she got Roy Scheider the role in the film as the two had done shows together in repertory theater in Washington, D.C. Hilligoss suggested Scheider the role in the film as the villain, which Tenney agreed with, stating that Scheider looked like George C. Scott. Robert Verberkmoes was the art director for the film.

The film was shot in Stamford, Connecticut.

== Release ==
It was later announced in the January 1964 issue of Variety that Iselin-Tenney had arranged a release of the film as part of their "shock film package" through Twentieth Century-Fox Film Corp. where the film once titled Invasion of the Zombies was now titled The Horror of Party Beach. The Curse of the Living Corpse was released in Detroit on April 1, 1964. It was later released in New York on April 29, 1964, and in Los Angeles on June 3, 1964. On the film's release in New York and Los Angeles, it shared a double feature bill with The Horror of Party Beach. In the May 4, and May 11, 1964, issues of Daily Variety estimated that the films earned $37,000 in the first two weeks at the New York City's Paramount Theatre.

== Reception ==
According to the American Film Institute, critical reception to the film was "generally scathing".
