= Great Day in the Morning (play) =

1962 Broadway play by Alice Cannon

- Written by: Alice Cannon
- Original language: English
- Genre: Drama
- Setting: St. Louis, 1928. The Flaherty home.

Premiere
- Date premiered: 1962

Great Day in the Morning is a dramatic stage play written by American playwright Alice McCamley Cannon (1919–2017). The play premiered on Broadway at Henry Millers Theatre in 1962. Colleen Dewhurst was nominated for the Tony Award for Best Actress in a Play for her performance in the production. The play is semi-autobiographical and based on Cannon's Irish Catholic upbringing in St. Louis, Missouri.

== Original cast ==
Character	Original Broadway cast (1962)
Phoebe Flaherty	Colleen Dewhurst
Alice McAnany	Frances Sternhagen
Joe McAnany	J. D. Cannon
Brennan Farrell	Clifton James
Dutchy	Elisabeth Fraser
Tricky Hennessey	Thomas Carlin
Mrs. Grace	Eulabelle Moore
Schultz	Lou Frizzell
Owen Brady	David Canary
Father Finney	Gene Roche
Sis McAnany	Peggy Burke
Richie McAnany	Jeff Herrod
First Policeman	James Mishler
Second Policeman	Michael Bradford

== Production history ==
The show had an out of town tryout at the Shubert Theatre in Detroit, Michigan before opening on Broadway at the Henry Miller Theatre on March 28, 1962, and closed on April 7, 1962, after 13 performances. The play was nominated for two Tony Awards for Colleen Dewhurst for Best Lead Actress in a Play and Best Director for José Quintero. Costumes were designed by Noel Taylor. Alice Cannon was the wife of actor J. D. Cannon, who acted in the play in a supporting role. Frances Sternhagen and her husband Thomas A. Carlin also acted together in this production. Tresa Hughes was an understudy in the production.
