= Santa Jr. =

- Written by: Marc Hershon
- Directed by: Kevin Connor
- Starring: Lauren Holly; Judd Nelson; Nick Stabile; Ed Gale
- Music by: Ken Thorne
- Country of origin: United States
- Original language: English

Production
- Producers: Wendy Winks; Kyle Clark; Kevin Bocarde
- Cinematography: Doug Milsome
- Editor: Jennifer Jean Cacavas
- Running time: 100 minutes
- Production companies: an Alpine Medien production in association with Larry Levinson Productions

Original release
- Network: ABC Family
- Release: December 6, 2002

Santa Jr. is a 2002 American made-for-television romantic comedy Christmas film starring Lauren Holly and Judd Nelson. It premiered on Hallmark Channel in 2002. As of 2009, it was shown in the 25 Days of Christmas programming block on ABC Family, but it was not part of the block in 2010.

== Plot ==
While delivering toys, Santa's son (Nick Stabile) is arrested for trespassing because another person impersonating Santa is burglarizing homes. Dispirited, he turns for help to a public defender (Lauren Holly).

== Cast ==
- Lauren Holly as Susan Flynn
- Judd Nelson as Darryl Bedford
- Nick Stabile as Chris Kringle Jr.
- Ed Gale as Stan
- Diane Robin as Pietra Nero
- Jaime P. Gomez as Earl Hernandez
- Kimberly Scott as Mrs. Taylor
- Charlie Robinson as Judge Wheeler
- Eugene M. Davis as DiGregorio
- George Wallace as Norm Potter

== Reviews ==
Scott Hettrick of the Entertainment News Service called the movie "The first delightful cable Christmas movie of the season", but added that "There is little of substance here, just lightweight holiday fare to start the season off with jolly good feelings". The Movie Scene called it "a pleasant little Christmas movie which if it crops up on TV and you need something to amuse the children it will do the job and you might enjoy a few bits as well. But it isn't the sort of Christmas movie which you will remember a great deal of a day or so later". Complex.com ranked the movie 2nd in a list "The 15 Most Ridiculous Hallmark Movies Of All Time". "Anyone with even a shred of taste should stay away from this film", the writer reasoned.

== See also ==
- List of Christmas films
