= Robert Verberkmoes =

- Born: September, 1931; Madison, Wisconsin
- Died: November, 1986; Portugal
- Occupations: Scenic Designer, Set Designer, Art Director

Robert Verberkmoes. (September 1931– November 1986) sometimes credited as Bob Verberkmoes or Robert Ver Berkmoes, was an American scenic designer, set designer, costume designer, and art director whose work spanned theater, ballet, modern dance, opera, and film. Over a decades-long career, he designed hundreds of productions and was widely regarded for his craftsmanship, versatility, and dedication to live performance.

== Early life and education ==
Verberkmoes was from Madison, Wisconsin, and graduated from East High School in 1950. He served for four years in the United States Navy during the Korean War, including combat duty in the Far East. After his military service, he studied sculpture and painting at Columbia University. To strengthen his technical skills, he studied theatrical design under prominent set and costume designer, Lester Polakov, who at the time was teaching at Columbia.

== Career ==
Verberkmoes began designing in the mid-1950s for Off-Broadway theaters, including the Cherry Lane Theatre. A chance recommendation from actor Roscoe Lee Browne led him to the New York Shakespeare Festival, where he met producer Joseph Papp. When the company’s second production of the season needed a scenic designer, Verberkmoes stepped in—marking the start of a long and fruitful career in the performing arts.

His talent for design quickly drew notice, and he became affiliated with the New York State Council on the Arts and the New York City Center for Music and Drama. He also worked as scenic designer for the New York City Ballet.

In the 1960s and 1970s, Verberkmoes was active across regional, touring, and summer stock theaters throughout North America. In 1965, he designed the eight-week summer season for the Hampton Playhouse in New Hampshire—known for polished productions and respected founders. But it was his later work with the Kenley Players, at the Star Theater in Wichita, Kansas and Flint, Michigan and at the Memorial Hall in Dayton, Ohio and at the Packard Music Hall in Warren, Ohio, that marked a major career milestone. The Kenley shows were primarily large-scale musicals, often featuring major television and film stars, Kenley demanded both technical ambition and theatrical flair. Verberkmoes met that challenge with designs that delivered spectacle within practical constraints, helping define the look and feel of what was then considered the gold standard of American summer theater.

In 1967, he was invited by the Queen Elizabeth II Arts Council to Christchurch, New Zealand, where he played a key role in the founding of the Canterbury Theatre Trust, the country’s first national professional theater company.

Although Verberkmoes also contributed to film—including designing monster costumes and serving as art director for the cult horror film The Horror of Party Beach (1964) —his true legacy lies in his theatrical work. He was a devoted artisan in an increasingly commercialized industry, part of a vanishing generation of deeply hands-on, multidisciplinary designers who remained committed to the stage.

== Later life and death ==
Later in life, Verberkmoes moved to the Algarve region of Portugal, where he pursued painting and visual art. He died in Portugal in November 1986.

== Selected works ==
Theater, Dance

- 1956 Taming of the Shrew – New York Shakespeare Festival, NYC – technical director
- 1956 Camille– The Cherry Lane Theatre, NYC – set designer
- 1957 The Trojan Women – Theatre Marquee – set designer
- 1959 Mis-guided Tour – Off-Broadway, Downtown Theatre – NYC – production designer
- 1961 A Trip to Chinatown – Off-Off Broadway – NYC – set designer
- 1962 Fiorello, Sunday in New York, Wedding Breakfast – Fayetteville Country Playhouse, Fayetteville, New York – set designer
- 1965 Mary Mary, Send Me No Flowers, Never Too Late, A View from the Bridge, Burlesque, Ladies Night, Who’s Afraid of Virginia Wolf, Period of Adjustment – The Hampton Playhouse, Hampton, NH – set designer
- 1966 Unsinkable Molly Brown, Guys and Dolls, The Pajama Game – Town and Country Playhouse, Pittsford, NY – set designer
- 1968 The Initiate (Choreographed by John Butler) The Repertory Dance Theater of Salt Lake City, UT – scenery, costumes and lighting
- 1968 Take Me Along, Pal Joey - Kenley Players Production, Warren, OH and Dayton OH - scenic designer
- 1968 Take Me Along, Call Me Madam, Fantasticks, Pal Joey, The Student Prince – Kenley Players Production, Columbus, OH – set designer
- 1969 Showboat, Carousel, Pajama Game, Guys and Dolls, George M! Gypsy, Can-Can, Luv, The Merry Widow, My Fair Lady – Star Theater (Century II Performing Arts Center) Wichita, Kansas – scenic designer
- 1969 Showboat – Hershey Community Theater – Hershey, PA – set designer
- 1970 The Unsinkable Molly Brown, South Pacific, My Daughter, Your Son, Mr. Roberts, The Only Game in Town – Star Theater (Century II Performing Arts Center) – Wichita, Kansas – scenic designer
- 1972 The Sound of Music, Mame, Come Blow Your Horn, Send Me No Flowers, Man La Mancha, Showboat, 1776, Can-Can, Last of the Red-Hot Lovers, Fiddler on the Roof – Star Theater of Flint – Michigan– scenic designer
- 1974 Caesar and Cleopatra – Sharon Playhouse, Sharon, CT – set designer
- 1975 The Runner Stumbles – Hartman Theatre Company – scenic design
- 1976 Portrait of Madonna, 27 Wagons of Cotton, I Rise in Flame, Cried the Phoenix – Hartman Theatre Company, Stamford, CT – set designer
- 1976 Joan of Lorraine – Hartman Theatre Company, Stamford, CT – set designer
- 1977 Death of a Salesman – Hartman Theatre Company, Stamford, CT – set designer

Film

- 1964 The Horror of Party Beach – art director
- 1964 The Curse of the Living Corpse – art director
- 1971 I Eat Your Skin – art director
