= Love That Jill =

1958 American television sitcom

- Genre: Sitcom
- Starring: Anne Jeffreys; Robert Sterling
- Country of origin: United States
- Original language: English
- No. of seasons: 1
- No. of episodes: 13

Production
- Producer: Alex Gottlieb
- Running time: 30 mins.
- Production company: Hal Roach Studios

Original release
- Network: ABC
- Release: January 20 – April 14, 1958

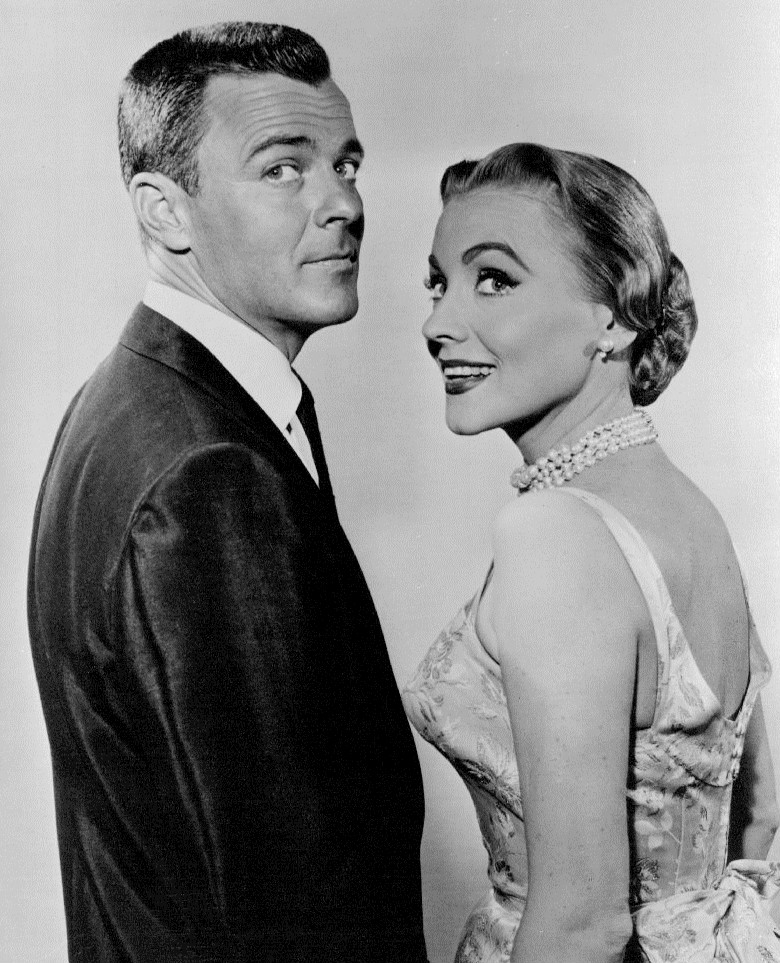
Robert Sterling as Jack Gibson and Anne Jeffreys as Jill Johnson in Love That Jill

Love That Jill is an American sitcom that aired on ABC during the 1957–58 television season. The series stars Anne Jeffreys and Robert Sterling as the heads of rival modeling agencies in Manhattan.

== Synopsis ==
Jill Johnson and Jack Gibson are the heads of rival New York City modeling agencies in Manhattan. Jack is romantically attracted to Jill, but each of them constantly tries to take clients and models away from the other. Richard is Jill′s secretary, Pearl is Jack′s secretary, Ginger is one of Jill's models, and Melody and Peaches are among the other models at their agencies.

== Cast ==
- Anne Jeffreys as Jill Johnson
- Robert Sterling as Jack Gibson
- James Lydon as Richard
- Betty Lynn as Pearl
- Polly Rose as Myrtle
- Barbara Nichols as Ginger
- Nancy Hadley as Melody
- Kaye Elhardt as Peaches

== Production ==
Hal Roach Studios produced Love That Jill, and Alex Gottlieb served as producer for the series. Hal Roach Jr. was the executive producer, and William A. Seiter was the director.

Anne Jeffreys and Robert Sterling were married in real life.

The program replaced The Guy Mitchell Show, with Max Factor as the sponsor. Episodes were filmed in black and white with a laugh track.

== Broadcast history ==
Love That Jill premiered on ABC on January 20, 1958. It lasted only 13 episodes, the last of which aired on April 14, 1958. It was broadcast at 8:00 p.m. Eastern Time on Mondays throughout its run.

== Episodes ==
No.	Title	Original release date
1	"Tonight's the Night"	January 20, 1958
Jill invites Jack to her home for dinner and plans a giant double-cross.
2	"The Mating Machine"	January 27, 1958
Alternative title "Find Your Perfect Mate". Before Jack and Jill appear on the television show Find Your Perfect Mate, Jack decides to ensure that he will win a week of dates with Jill by manipulating the punched cards used in an electronic computer.
3	"Who Done It?"	February 3, 1958
Jill finesses Jack in a ruse that will give her — rather than an attempted burglary — front-page publicity.
4	"They Went Thataway"	February 10, 1958
While Jack and Jill are in Arizona to film a potato chip commercial, a man named Cliff makes advances toward Jill. Jill leads Jack on to make him jealous of Cliff, but in fact Cliff is interested in the hotel clerk, Sandy, and a justice of the peace marries Cliff to Sandy. During the episode, Jack and Jill sing "There's Silver on the Sage Tonight". Guest star: Chuck Connors.
5	"Vote for Me, Darling"	February 17, 1958
Selected as one of five finalists in the "Most Glamorous Career Woman" contest, Jill attempts to woo key votes out of three male judges.
6	"Operation Double Cross"	February 24, 1958
Jack plots with a beautiful model from Jill's agency to garner publicity for his own agency.
7	"Kiss Me, Sergeant"	March 3, 1958
Jack talks Jill into going out to dinner with him and his buddy, a United States Army sergeant, who ends up being a glamorous woman.
8	"Hug That Hillbilly"	March 10, 1958
When Jill decides to send one of her underage models back to her home in the Ozarks, Jack finds the model′s hillbilly father trying to force him into a shotgun wedding.
9	"Kid Stuff"	March 17, 1958
Jill promotes a golf lesson from Jack, leading to her takeover of one of his key accounts, a baby food company, at contract renewal time.
10	"Two for the Money"	March 24, 1958
Jack can collect an inheritance if he can establish that he is married to Jill.
11	"Bess of the Bowery"	March 31, 1958
The normally stylish and glamorous Jill dons disguises — including undistinguished clothing and a shaggy wig — to win an important vitamin company account from Jack's agency.
12	"Love That Foreign Sportscar"	April 7, 1958
Jill meets a swindling playboy.
13	"Make Mine Marriage"	April 14, 1958
Jack and Jill do their best to break up the nuptials of their respective secretaries.

== Critical response ==
A review in the trade publication Variety said the premiere episode "simpered through a thoroughly contrived plot", adding that Jeffreys's contributions were "a sly grin and a silly wiggle" and Sterling's work was "restricted by the asinine lines". The review acknowledged the episode had some potential, but it added that humor was scarce.
