= Taggart (film) =

1964 film by R. G. Springsteen

- Theatrical release poster
- Directed by: R. G. Springsteen
- Screenplay by: Robert Creighton Williams
- Based on: Louis L'Amour (based on the novel by)
- Produced by: Gordon Kay
- Starring: Tony Young; Dan Duryea; Dick Foran; Elsa Cárdenas; Jean Hale
- Cinematography: William Margulies
- Edited by: Tony Martinelli
- Music by: Herman Stein
- Color process: Technicolor
- Production companies: Gordon Kay & Associates
- Distributed by: Universal Pictures
- Release dates: December 24, 1964 (New York City); February 1, 1965 (United States)
- Running time: 85 minutes
- Country: United States
- Language: English

Taggart is a 1964 American Western film directed by R. G. Springsteen and starring Tony Young and Dan Duryea. It was the film debut of David Carradine.

== Plot ==
Just arriving at their newly bought land, Kent Taggart's family has their cattle stampeded and they are murdered by Ben Blazer and his son. Blazer is seriously wounded. Later in a fair gunfight Kent kills Blazer's son. With his last breath, Blazer sends three gunfighters to find and kill Kent: Vince August, Cal Dodge, and Jay Jason, who is a particularly talkative and vicious killer.

In his escape, Taggart heads towards territory that has fallen into Apache hands, followed by the gunfighters. In a semi-abandoned town, Taggart helps a lady in trouble at a saloon, getting in return the help of her and the bartender. Caught by the gunfighters, he manages to kill Cal and flee.

Later, he finds a couple who are fighting with Apaches. Taggart joins them, and also the gunfighters do. Vince is wounded, and Jay disarms Taggart. The couple helps him to escape.

With no horse or gun, Taggart hides in a rocky hill, where he gets caught by an old man, Adam Stark, and his daughter Miriam. They take him to their dwelling, where there is another young woman, Adam's wife Consuela.

They treat him as a dangerous prisoner, but later that night, Consuela visits him and makes unequivocal advances, promising Taggart riches and happiness if he takes her away from that place. They are surprised by Miriam, who stops the offering and the women have an angry exchange, but as has happened before, Miriam won't tell her father what his wife is doing.

The next day, when Taggart is escaping, he saves Stark's life from an Apache attack. Stark changes his mind about him, and shows Taggart the reason why they haven't left: a gold mine in the property. Stark fills a couple of bags with gold rocks and prepares to leave, before the next Apache attack.

Meanwhile, Jay has killed Vince because he had become a hindrance, so he arrives alone at the Stark place. Taggart explains he is a hired killer, and Jay explains he is pursuing a murderer. The Starks favor Taggart over Jay.

Later that night, Consuela visits Jay and makes unequivocal advances, promising him riches and happiness if he takes her away from that place. Jay is happy to oblige. Another Apache attack happens and Stark results wounded. Jay and Consuela escape with the gold; the Starks head to a fort, with Taggart ahead as a scout.

Jay and Consuela meet a cavalry supply convoy and join them for protection. While they are traveling in one of the Cavalry wagons, Consuela tells Jay she has changed her mind and wants to leave him. Jay attacks her, leaves her for dead, gets the gold, horses and manages to escape moments before the Apache surround and destroy the Cavalry convoy.

Jay arrives at the fort and asks for new horses to keep running. The officer in command asks whether he has seen the reinforcements they are expecting, and Jay says he hasn't seen anything but the destroyed convoy. The officer orders Jay to stay and fight. Taggart passes by the rest of the convoy, reunites with the Starks, and later they arrive at the same fort.

And so, Taggart, the Starks and the soldiers must defend themselves from a fierce Apache attack while hoping for reinforcements and Jay is trying to escape with the gold before Taggart sees him.

== Cast ==
- Tony Young as Kent Taggart
- Dan Duryea as Jay Jason
- Dick Foran as Adam Stark
- Elsa Cárdenas as Consuela Stark
- Jean Hale as Miriam Stark
- Emile Meyer as Ben Blazer
- Tom Reese as Vince August
- David Carradine as Cal Dodge
- Peter Duryea as Rusty Bob Blazer
- Ray Teal as Ralph Taggart
- Claudia Barrett as Lola Manners
- Stuart Randall as Sheriff
- Peter Mamakos as Cantina owner
- Arthur Space as Colonel
- Bill McLean as Doctor
- Harry Carey Jr. as Lt. Hudson
- William Henry as Army Sergeant

== See also ==
- List of American films of 1964
