= The Beach Boys: An American Family =

2000 film by Jeff Bleckner

- Genre: Drama
- Written by: Kirk Ellis
- Directed by: Jeff Bleckner
- Starring: Kevin Dunn; Fred Weller; Alley Mills; Nick Stabile; Matt Letscher; Emmanuelle Vaugier
- Music by: Gary Griffin
- Country of origin: United States
- Original language: English
- No. of episodes: 2

Production
- Executive producers: Neil Meron; Craig Zadan; John Stamos
- Producers: John Whitman; Alan Boyd; David Mace
- Cinematography: Brian J. Reynolds
- Editors: Geoffrey Rowland; Bryan M. Horne
- Running time: 175 minutes
- Production companies: Storyline Entertainment; Columbia TriStar Television

Original release
- Network: ABC
- Release: February 27 – February 28, 2000

The Beach Boys: An American Family is a 2000 American miniseries written by Kirk Ellis and directed by Jeff Bleckner. It is a dramatization of the early years of The Beach Boys, from their formation in the early 1960s to their peak of popularity as musical innovators, through their late-1960s decline (and Brian Wilson's beginning battle with mental illness), to their re-emergence in 1974 as a nostalgia and "goodtime" act.

== Production ==
The miniseries was shown in two parts on ABC, on February 27 and 28, 2000. It featured a good deal of original studio and session material by the band, which forms the backdrop to the story. Music that couldn't be licensed for the production, but was important to the story (such as the Smile album sessions, and music by criminal Charles Manson, who had collaborated with Dennis Wilson), was filled in with sound-alikes, reminiscent of the original recordings.

== Reaction ==
In 2000, Brian Wilson stated of the film: "I didn't like it, I thought it was in poor taste. ... And it stunk. I thought it stunk!" He elaborated further: "I didn't like the second part. It wasn't really true to the way things were. I'd like to see another movie if it was done right. But I just sort of turned my back to this one, or my other cheek, or whatever you wanna call it. It was best just to ignore it because it really wasn't true to life." Wilson also felt that he was poorly portrayed by actor Frederick Weller ("He was a little more rough than me") and that there was too much coverage of Charles Manson ("That was a commercial fuckup").

John Leonard, writing for New York, was not particularly impressed, writing "Haven’t we already seen several cut-rate documentaries and another TV movie on the same subject, Summer Dreams: The Story of the Beach Boys?"

== Cast ==
- Kevin Dunn as Murry Wilson
- Fred Weller as Brian Wilson
- Alley Mills as Audree Wilson
- Nick Stabile as Dennis Wilson
- Emmanuelle Vaugier as Suzanne Love
- Ryan Northcott as Carl Wilson
- Matt Letscher as Mike Love
- Ned Vaughn as Al Jardine
- Dublin James as David Marks
- Jesse Caron as Bruce Johnston
- Amy Van Horne as Marilyn Rovell
- Jad Mager as Nick Venet
- Eric Matheny as Chuck Britz
- Harris Laskaway as Voyle Gilmore
- Clay Wilcox as Tommy Schaeffer
- Anthony Rapp as Van Dyke Parks
- Erik Passoja as Charles Manson
- David Polcyn as Phil Spector
- Tera Hendrickson as Carol Kaye
- James Intveld as Hal Blaine
- Jessica Shannon as a concert girl
- Elliot Kendall as Glen Campbell
- Steve Stanley as Barney Kessel
- Trevor St. John as Jan Berry
- Jacob Young as Dean Torrence

== Awards ==
The Beach Boys: An American Family was nominated in nine individual categories at different award ceremonies.

It won three out of those nine categories that it was nominated in. Listed below are the categories that the movie was nominated in as well as for what award:

- 2000
  - Emmy Awards
    - Outstanding Mini-series
    - Single-Camera Picture Editing For A Mini-series, Movie Or A Special
    - Single-Camera Sound Mixing For A Mini-series Or A Movie
  - Artios Awards
    - Best Casting For TV Mini-Series
- 2001
  - Eddie Awards
    - Best Edited Miniseries or Motion Picture for Commercial Television (won)
  - Excellence In Production Design Awards
    - Best Television Movie or Mini-Series
  - C.A.S. Awards
    - Outstanding Achievement In Sound Mixing For A Television Movie-of-the-Week, Mini-Series (won)
  - DGA Awards
    - Outstanding Directorial Achievement In Movies For Television (won)
  - Golden Satellite Awards
    - Best Mini-series (nom)
