= Roxbury Memorial Park =

Park in Beverly Hills, California, United States

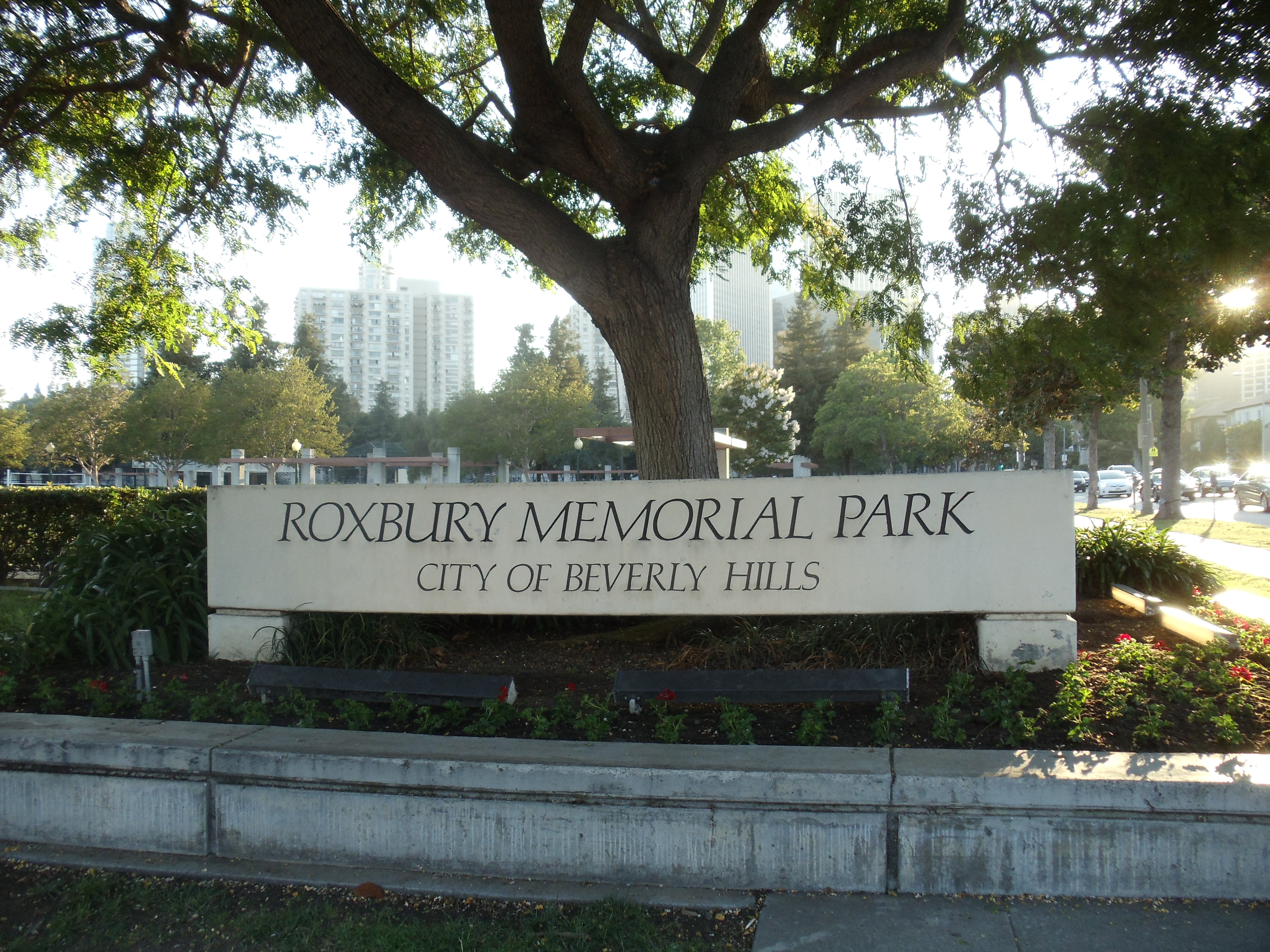
- Interactive map of Roxbury Memorial Park
- Type: Municipal
- Location: 471 South Roxbury Drive, Beverly Hills, California, 90212
- Coordinates: 34.0586°N 118.4070°W
- Open: 8a.m.-10p.m.

Roxbury Memorial Park is a public park in Beverly Hills, California.

== Location ==
The park is located at 471 South Roxbury Drive in Beverly Hills, California. It is surrounded by Olympic Boulevard, South Roxbury Drive, and South Spalding Drive. It is a few streets away from the Beverly Hills High School.

== Facilities ==
The park is home to two lawn bowling and croquet greens, four tennis courts, basketball courts, children's playgrounds, locker shower rooms and restrooms.

Since 1999, it has been home to a yellow rose garden in honor of Linda Tallen Kane, wife of David Paul Kane, a Beverly Hills businessman.

In 2013–2014, a new clubhouse known as the Roxbury Park Community Center was constructed. It was dedicated on June 8, 2014.

== Beverly Hills Lawn Bowling Club ==
It is home to the Beverly Hills Lawn Bowling Club founded in 1926. It moved to Roxbury Memorial Park in the 1930s, when the first clubhouse was built. Early players included actors Otto Kruger (1885-1974) and Edward Arnold (1890-1956). Walt Disney (1901-1966) was also a donor and regular player.

The Walt Disney Masters Singles are held once a year in his honor.

== Gallery ==
Roxbury Memorial Park
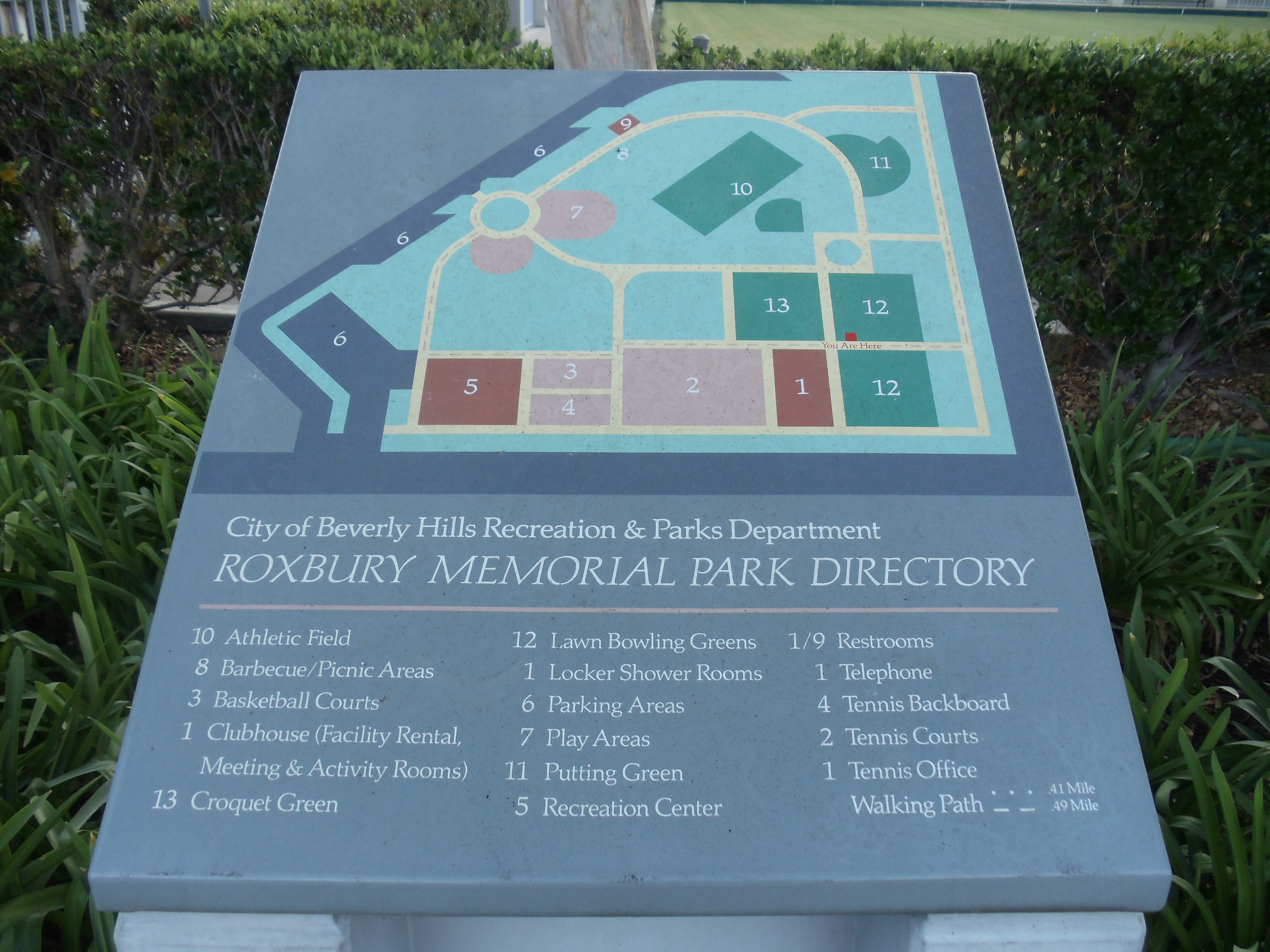
Roxbury Memorial Park Directory

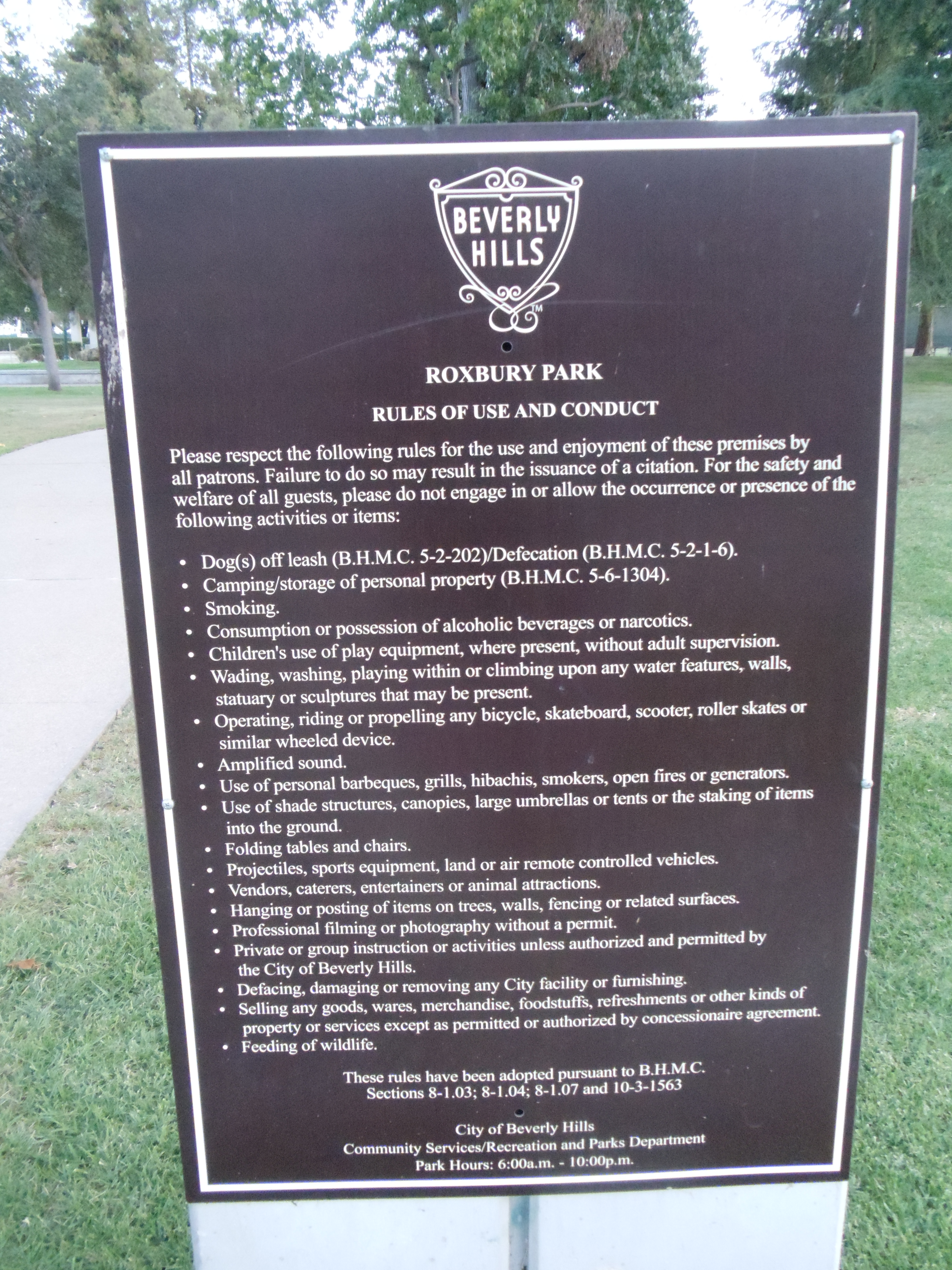
Rules of use and conduct

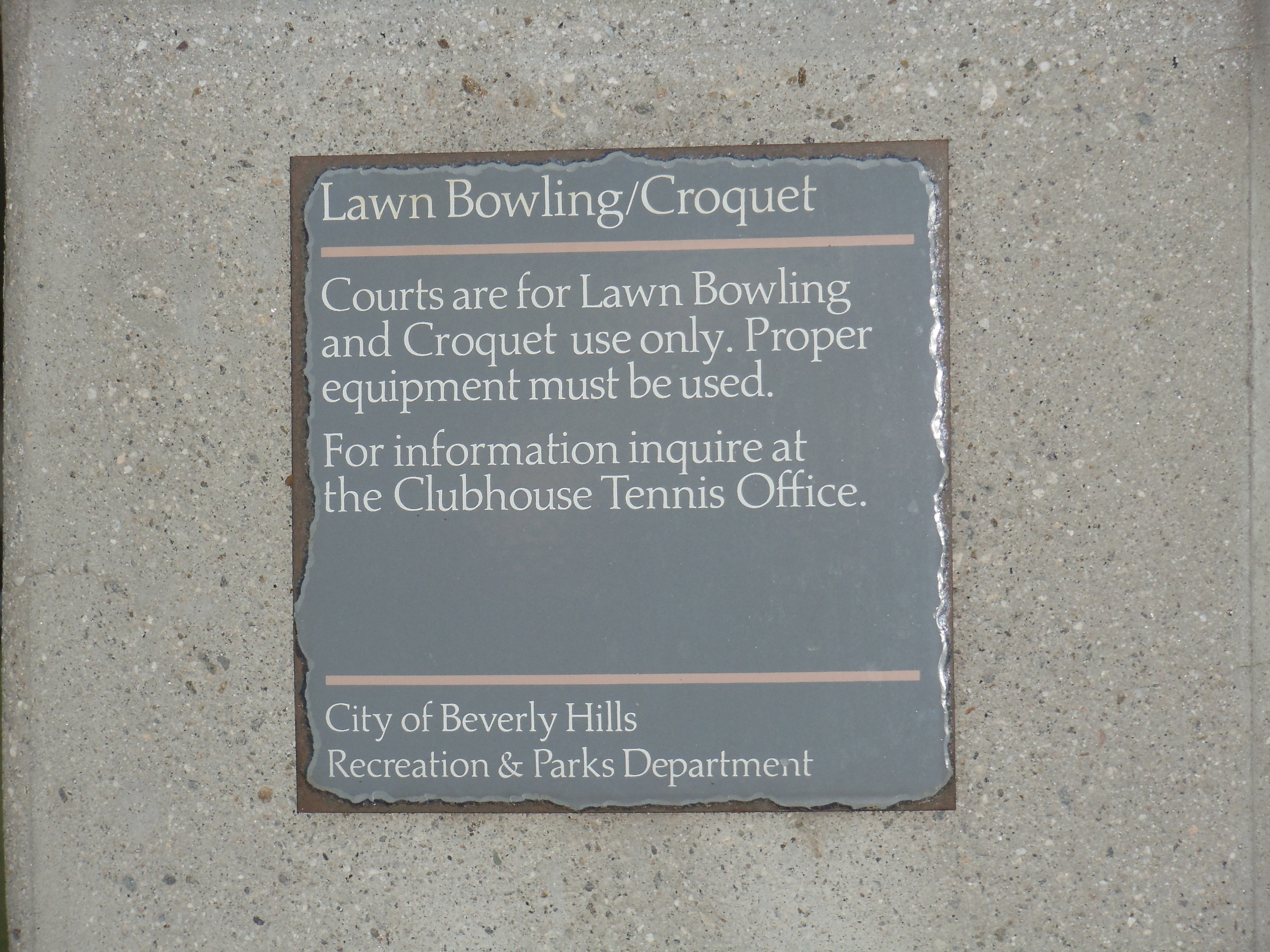
Lawn bowling and croquet instructions

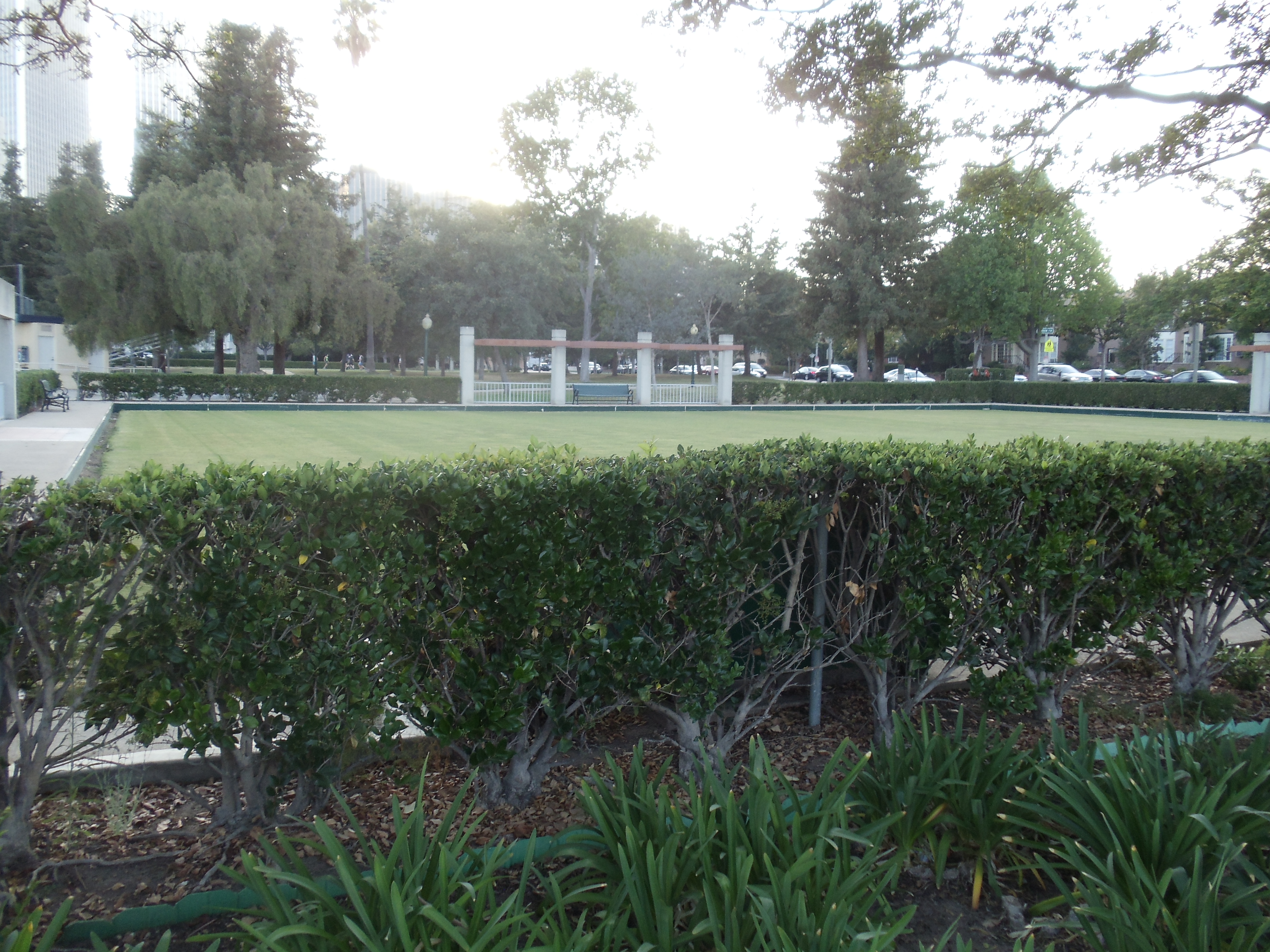
Lawn bowling green

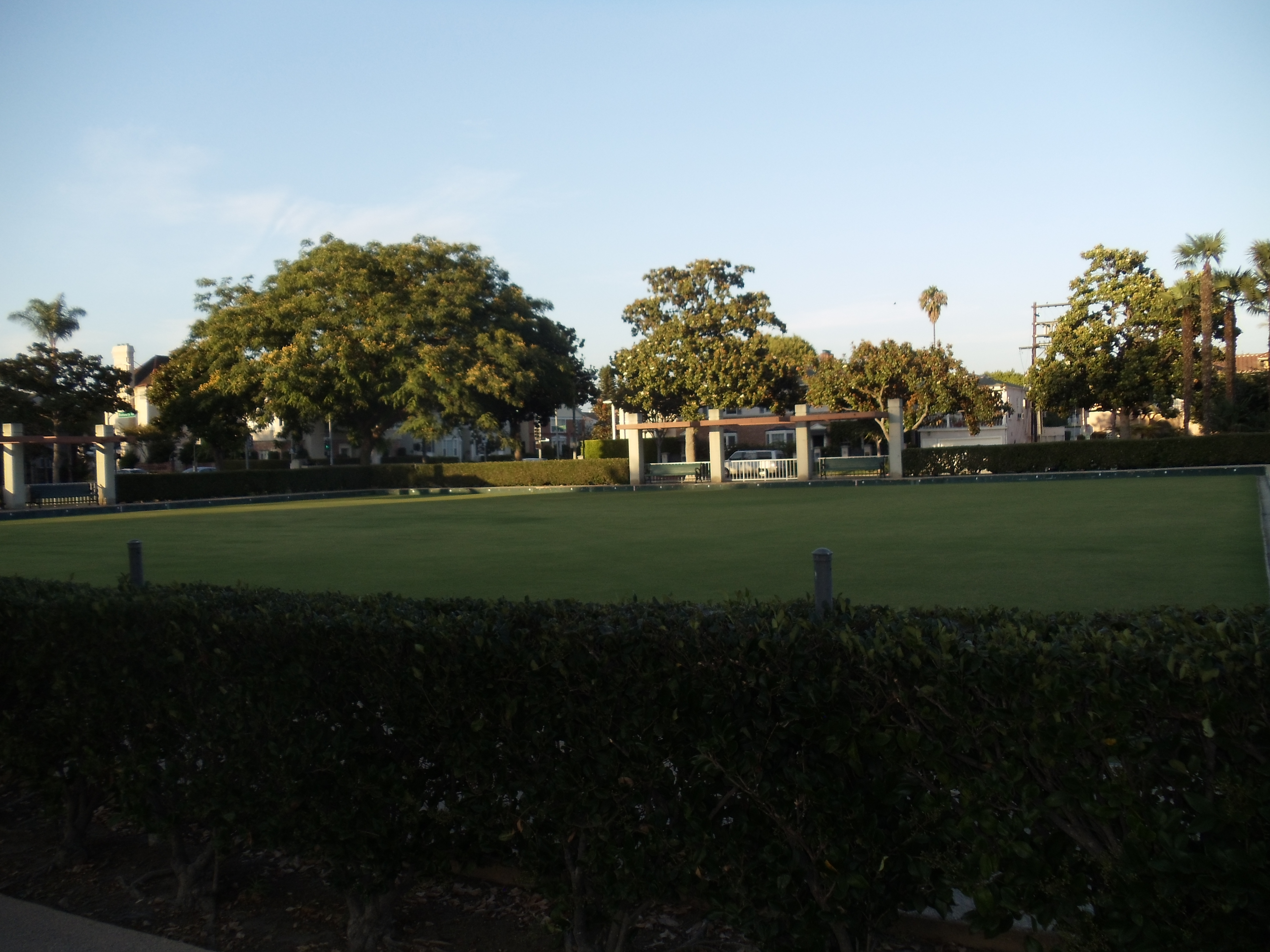
Another lawn bowling green

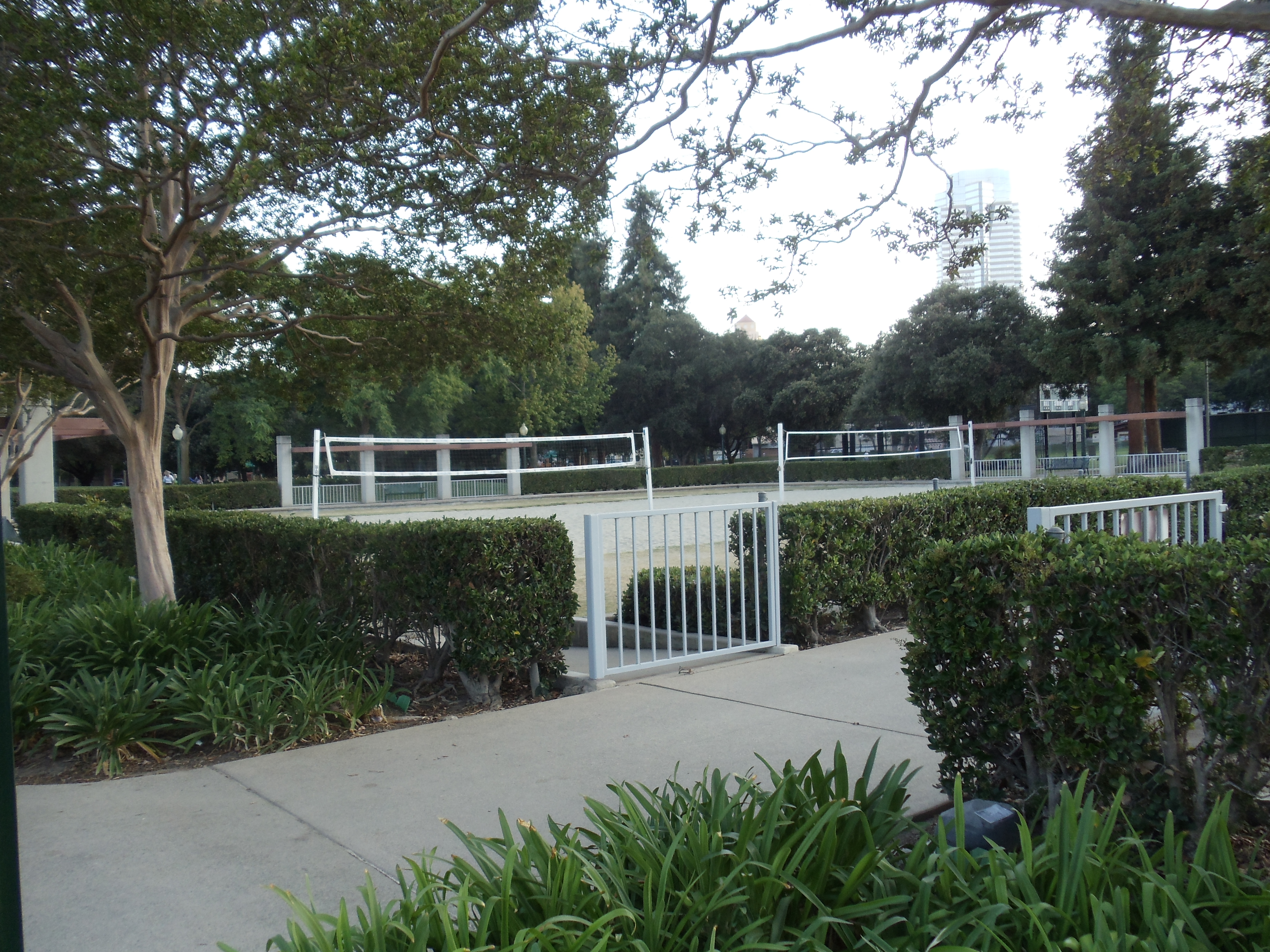
Volleyball field

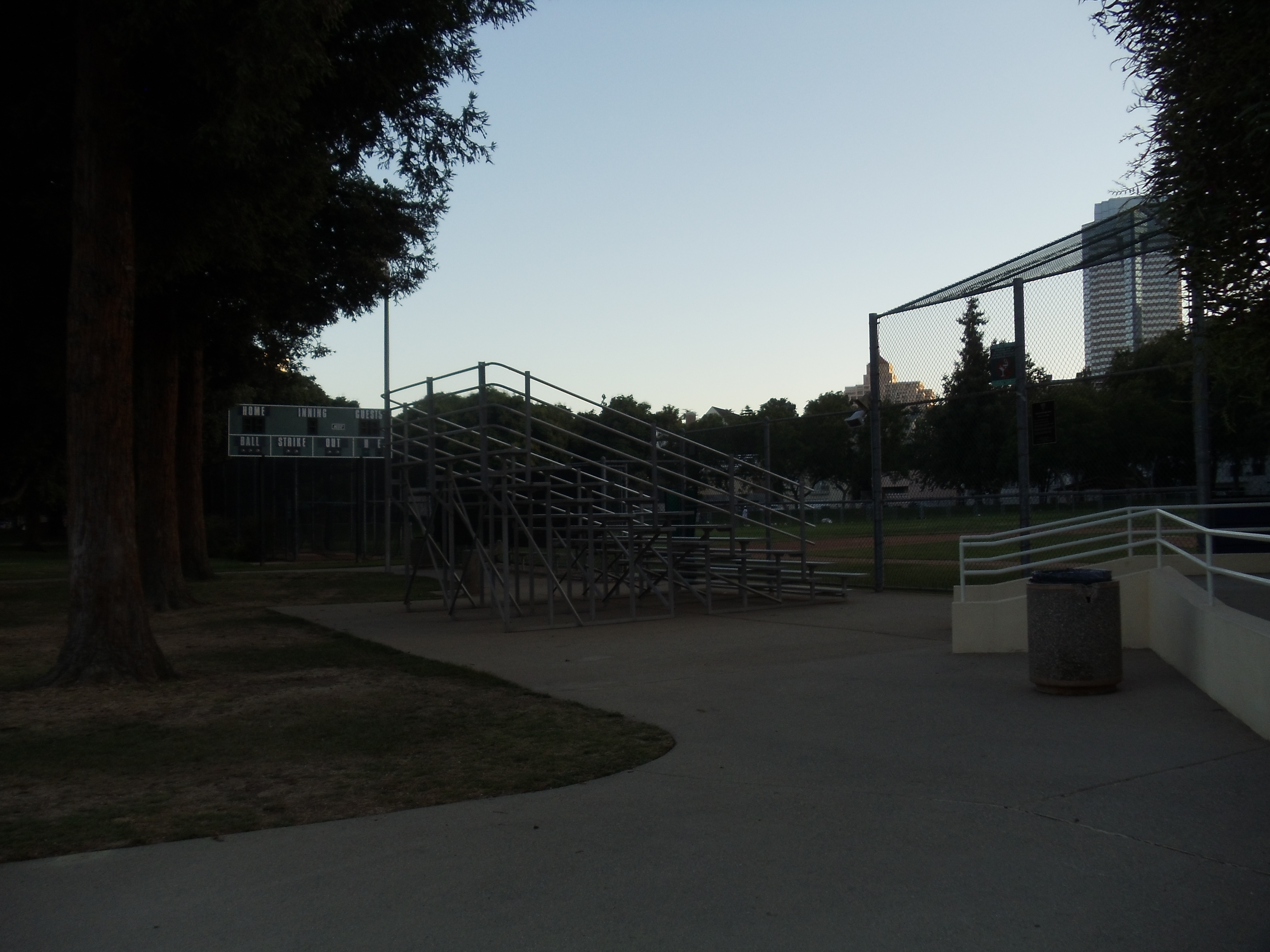
Seats

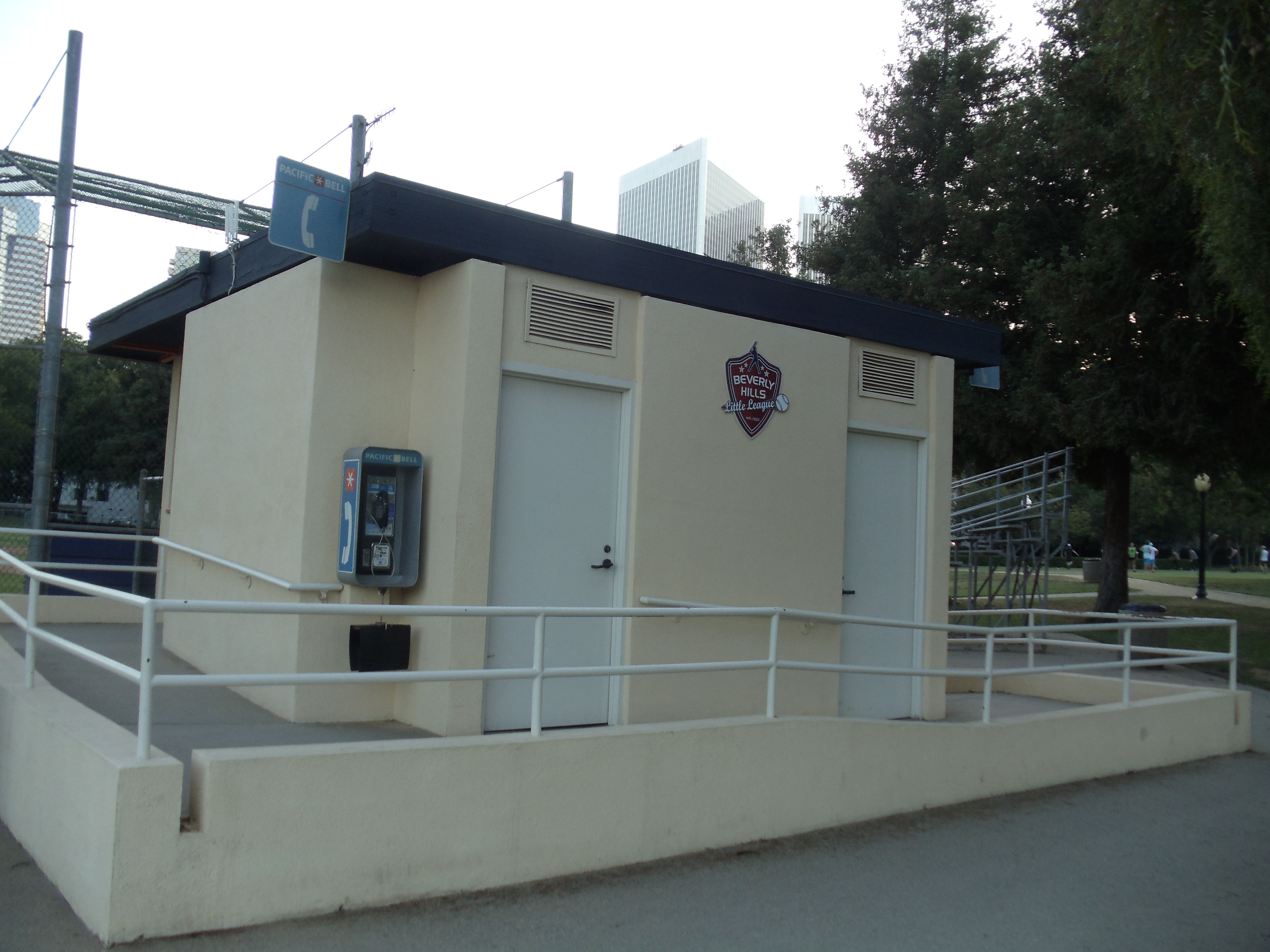
Beverly Hills Little League sign on small building

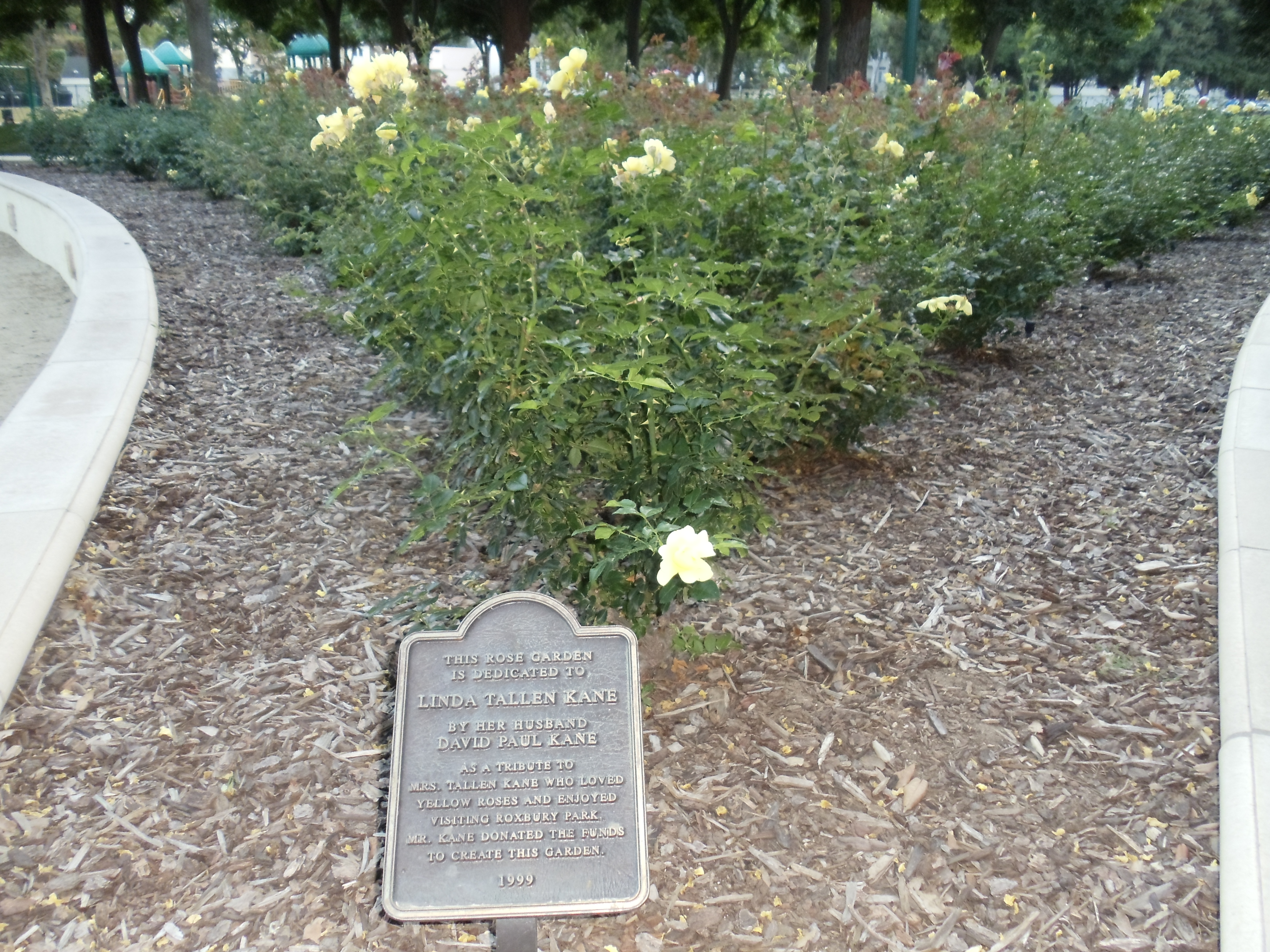
Rose garden in honor of Linda Tallen Kane
