= Jean Hale =

American actress (1938–2021)

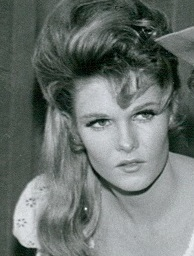
- Hale in a 1964 publicity photo
- Born: Carol Jane Hale; December 27, 1938; Salt Lake City, Utah, U.S.
- Died: August 3, 2021 (aged 82); Santa Monica, California, U.S.
- Occupation: Actress
- Years active: 1960–1991
- Spouse: Dabney Coleman (m. 1961; div. 1983)
- Children: 3

Jean Hale (born Carol Jane Hale; December 27, 1938 – August 3, 2021) was an American actress.

== Early years ==
Hale was born in Salt Lake City, Utah. Her parents were Stanton G and Doris (Norrell) Hale. Jean Hale was raised a Mormon. She studied at the University of Utah and at Skidmore College, then moved to New York City. There she learned from Sydney Pollack at the Neighborhood Playhouse.

== Film and television ==
In the early 1960s, Hale appeared in commercials and danced on the television series Sing Along with Mitch.

In films, Hale played Miriam Stark in Taggart (1964), Cheryl Barker in The Oscar (1966), Myrtle in The St. Valentine's Day Massacre (1967) and Lisa in In Like Flint (1967). She also appeared in several television shows in the 1960s. She made two 1965 appearances on Perry Mason; in both roles she played Perry's client: Reggie Lansfield in "The Case of the Murderous Mermaid," (Season 8, Episode 23) and Carla Chaney in "The Case of the Laughing Lady" (Season 9, Episode 1). Other television appearances include The Alfred Hitchcock Hour, Batman, Bob Hope Presents the Chrysler Theatre, Bonanza, The Fugitive, Hawaii Five-O, McHale's Navy, My Favorite Martian ("The Atom Misers", air date 12/15/63), The Men from Shiloh in 1971, Hogan's Heroes, and The Wild Wild West ("The Night That Terror Stalked The Town", S1 Ep10, as Marie)

In 1984, Hale and Gino Tanasescu created Coleman-Tanasescu Entertainment, a production company, and in 2000 she began heading her own production company.

== Personal life ==
She married Dabney Coleman in 1961. They had three children. They divorced in 1983.

Hale died of natural causes on August 3, 2021, in Santa Monica, California, at the age of 82.

== Filmography ==
Year	Title	Role	Notes
1963	Violent Midnight	Carol Bishop	
1963	My Favorite Martian	Jenine Carter	
1963	The Alfred Hitchcock Hour	Babs Riordan	Season 2 Episode 7: "Starring the Defense"
1964	The Alfred Hitchcock Hour	Bernice Brown	Season 2 Episode 12: "Three Wives Too Many"
1964	Taggart	Miriam Stark	
1964	Felicia		
1965	McHale's Navy Joins the Air Force	Sergeant Madge Collins	
1965	Perry Mason	Carla Chaney / Reggie Lansfield	2 episodes
1966	Hogan's Heroes	Kathy Pruitt, Prisoner Of War	Season 1 Episode 28: "I Look Better in Basic Black"
1966	The Oscar	Cheryl Barker	
1967	In Like Flint	Lisa	
1967	The St. Valentine's Day Massacre	Myrtle Gorman	
1969	Hawaii Five-O	Lois Walker	Season 1, Episode 18 "Along came Joey."
1987	Pals	Muffy	TV movie
1990	Thanksgiving Day	Melanie Crandall	TV movie
1991	Lies Before Kisses	Veronica	TV movie, (final film role)
