= Del Tenney =

American actor (1930–2013)

- Born: Delbert Tenney; July 27, 1930; Mason City, Iowa, United States
- Died: February 21, 2013 (aged 82); Jupiter, Florida, United States
- Occupations: Actor, film director, screenwriter, film producer
- Spouse: Margot Hartman

Delbert "Del" Tenney (July 27, 1930 – February 21, 2013) was an American actor, film director, screenwriter and film producer.

== Life and career ==
Tenney was born in Mason City, Iowa, in 1930. Moving with his parents at age 12 to Los Angeles while they found work during World War II. As an adult, he studied in theater programs in both Los Angeles City College and Cal State LA, with classmates including James Coburn and Alan Arkin. Later in 1954 he would move to New York and began acting alongside other part-time jobs to make ends meet, including washing dishes and working as a detective.

Starting out as an actor, he appeared in some Off-Broadway plays and summer stock, and also performed in the Broadway premiere of Terence Rattigan's play Ross. He would decide to quit acting in 1962 to focus on filmmaking. After working as an assistant director on several low budget features he would later categorize as soft core pornography, he then established a legacy in film directing several low-budget horror/exploitation films in the 1960s, including The Horror of Party Beach (1964). Based in Connecticut, Tenney's other films with producing partner Allen Iselin include Psychomania (a.k.a. Violent Midnight), The Curse of the Living Corpse, and I Eat Your Skin. After the production and trouble finding a distributor for Skin, and seeing the success of horror films with much larger budgets such as from Hammer and star-studded disaster films, Tenney felt the low-budget market had fallen apart and retired from filmmaking.

Tenney died on February 21, 2013, at his home in Jupiter, Florida at the age of 82.

== Personal life ==
Tenney married stage and film actress Margot Hartman. They remained married until his death.

== Filmography ==
Year	Title	Role	Notes
1953	Stalag 17	(uncredited)	
1953	The Wild One	(uncredited)	
1962	Satan in High Heels	Paul	
1963	Violent Midnight	Bar Patron (uncredited)	Producer, uncredited co-writer
1964	The Curse of the Living Corpse	The Living Corpse (uncredited)	Director, Writer, Producer
1964	The Horror of Party Beach	Gas Station Attendant (uncredited)	Director, Producer
1966	The Poppy Is Also a Flower TV movie		Exec. Associate Producer
1971	I Eat Your Skin	(uncredited stuntman)	Director, Writer, Producer; filmed in 1964
2000	The Clean and Narrow	Mayor Reynolds	Executive Producer
2001	Do You Wanna Know a Secret?	Pastor Clifford Adams (final film role)	Writer, Producer
2003	Descendant		Co-director, Story, Executive Producer
