= Margot Hartman =

American actress (1933–2020)

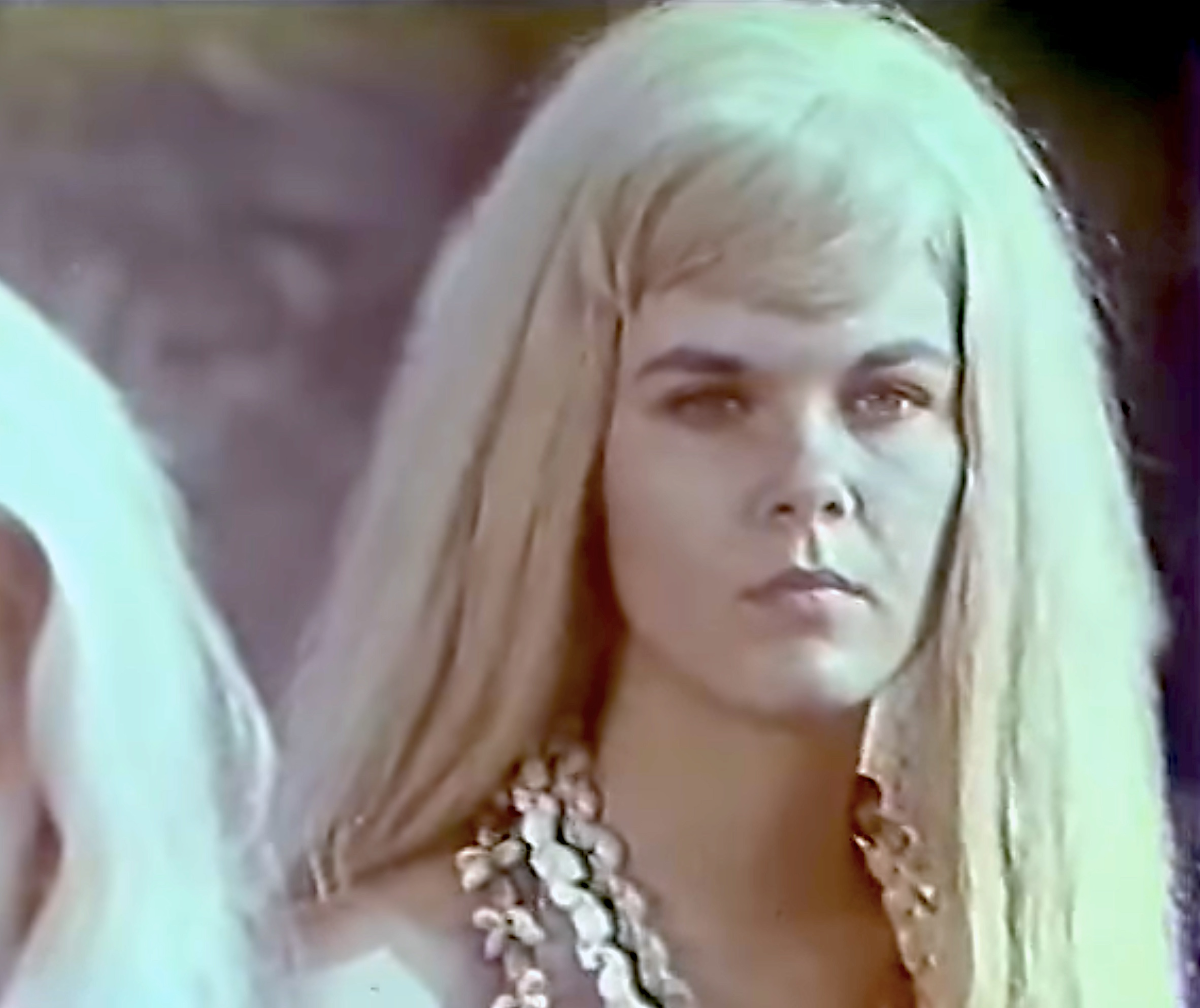
- Margot Hartman as Mayaway in the 1968 film Voyage to the Planet of Prehistoric Women
- Born: Margot Sari Hartman; August 15, 1933; New York City, U.S.
- Died: April 11, 2020 (aged 86)
- Occupations: Actress, philanthropist, businessperson
- Spouse: Del Tenney
- Children: 3

Margot Sari Hartman Tenney (/ˈmɑːrɡoʊ ˈhɑːrtmən/; August 15, 1933 – April 11, 2020) was an American actress and the chairman of the board of the First Stamford Corporation, one of the largest privately held commercial real estate companies in the State of Connecticut.

== Biography ==
Born and raised in New York City, the daughter of Dorothy and Jesse Hartman, she started her professional career as an actress at the Arena Stage Company in Washington, D.C.

After years of working in the regional theatre, Margot founded the Hartman Theatre Company in Stamford, Connecticut.

For more than a decade the Hartman Theatre Company served as one of the nation's leading regional theatres and was the recipient of a special Drama Desk Award for Producing Unprecedented Work, such as the pre-Broadway production of The Runner Stumbles in the theatre's premiere season.

Through the creation of the Dorothy and Jesse Hartman Foundation, Margot supported several not for profit institutions such as the Palm Beach Shakespeare Festival. She also served on the board of directors for the Eugene O’Neill Theatre Center, The Helen Hayes Theatre in Nyack, New York, and the Musical Theatre Works Company in New York.

She received the Lifetime Achievement Award for the Advancement of Women from the Connecticut United Nations Associations. She was presented with an Outstanding Connecticut Woman Award by Governor O’Neill in the State Senator Chamber and thanked by the United States Senator Christopher Dodd (D-CT) for her service to the State.

Margot Hartman was a graduate and member of the Board of Directors of Bennington College where she was a major financial supporter of the institution. At Bennington she provided the support for the creation of the new Margot Tenney Theatre space for the undergraduate drama program.

The Hartman Foundation supports the Stamford branch of Planned Parenthood. She wrote the novel, Dark Deeds Sweet Songs.

== Personal life ==
Margot Hartman was married to Del Tenney, an independent film producer, until his death in 2013. Margot Hartman Tenney died on April 11, 2020, aged 86. Margot Hartman Tenney had three children and seven grandchildren.
