= Kevin Yagher =

American special effects technician (born 1962)

- Born: June 23, 1962 (age 63); Lawrence, Kansas, U.S.
- Occupation: Special effects technician
- Years active: 1984–present
- Spouse: Catherine Hicks (m. 1990)
- Children: 1

Kevin Yagher (born June 23, 1962) is an American special effects technician, known for Freddy Krueger's makeup, the Chucky doll effects, and The Crypt Keeper animatronic.

== Career ==
His company, Kevin Yagher Productions, has created effects for A Nightmare on Elm Street 2: Freddy's Revenge, A Nightmare on Elm Street 3: Dream Warriors, A Nightmare on Elm Street 4: The Dream Master, Face/Off, Enemy of the State, Volcano, Starship Troopers, Conspiracy Theory, Radio Flyer, Mission: Impossible 2, and Honey, I Blew Up the Kid. Yagher's other credits include Tales from the Crypt, and Child's Play, where he met his wife, Catherine Hicks.

He is the designer and executor of the Chucky doll. Yagher frequently collaborated with puppeteer Brock Winkless on his productions. For example, Winkless performed the puppetry for Chucky in Child's Play and several of its sequels. Yagher and Winkless also worked closely on the visual effects of Honey, I Blew Up the Kid (1992).

Yagher directed Hellraiser: Bloodline, but decided to be credited as Alan Smithee after Dimension Films re-edited the film. He heads Kevin Yagher Productions, Inc.

Yagher has worked with "Weird Al" Yankovic on a number of occasions. In 1988, Yagher created a fat suit and appliance makeup for Yankovic's "Fat" video, which Yankovic later wore in his concerts while performing the song. A year later, Yagher created prosthetics that gave Yankovic a hypermuscular upper body when parodying Rambo in his film UHF.

== Personal life ==
He was married to actress Catherine Hicks on May 19, 1990. The two have a daughter, Caitlin, who was born in 1992. He is a diabetic. He has two brothers: actor Jeff Yagher and special makeup effects artist Chris Yagher.

== Filmography ==
=== Special makeup effects artist ===
- Bill & Ted Face the Music (2020)
- Ghosted (2017)
- The Finder (2012)
- Rizzoli & Isles (2010-2016)
- The Spiderwick Chronicles (2008)
- Bones (2005-2017)
- Æon Flux (2005)
- Xtreme Fakeovers (2005)
- Lemony Snicket's A Series of Unfortunate Events (2004)
- 13 Going on 30 (2004)
- Hulk (2003)
- The Matrix Revolutions (2003)
- The Matrix Reloaded (2003)
- The Cat in the Hat (2003)
- Anger Management (2003)
- Cradle 2 the Grave (2003)
- Adaptation (2002)
- The Master of Disguise (2002)
- Windtalkers (2002)
- Blow (2001)
- Mission: Impossible 2 (2000)
- Sleepy Hollow (1999)
- The Astronaut's Wife (1999)
- In Dreams (1999)
- Bride Of Chucky (1998)
- Enemy Of The State (1998)
- Conspiracy Theory (1997)
- Aerosmith's "Pink" Music Video (1997)
- Starship Troopers (1997)
- Face/Off (1997)
- Bordello of Blood (1996)
- The Fan (1996)
- The Dentist (1996)
- Rumpelstiltskin (1996)
- Hellraiser: Bloodline (1996)
- Demon Knight (1995)
- Dr. Jekyll and Ms. Hyde (1995)
- Children of the Corn III: Urban Harvest (1995)
- Getting Even With Dad (1994)
- Man's Best Friend (1993)
- Honey, I Blew Up the Kid (1992)
- Article 99 (1992)
- Defenseless (1991)
- Child's Play 3 (1991)
- Bill & Ted's Bogus Journey (1991)
- The Borrower (1991)
- Child's Play 2 (1990)
- Meet the Applegates (1990)
- Tales From The Crypt (1989-1996)
- Glory (1989)
- The Phantom of the Opera (1989)
- Bill & Ted's Excellent Adventure (1989)
- Freddy's Nightmares (1988)
- A Nightmare on Elm Street 4: The Dream Master (1988)
- Child's Play (1988)
- The Seventh Sign (1988)
- Cherry 2000 (1987)
- The Hidden (1987)
- A Nightmare on Elm Street 3: Dream Warriors (1987)
- Trick or Treat (1986)
- A Nightmare on Elm Street 2: Freddy's Revenge (1985)
- Friday the 13th: The Final Chapter (1984)
