= My Buddy =

My Buddy may refer to:

- My Buddy (TV series), a 2009 Mediacorp drama produced by Matrix Vision
- My Buddy (doll), a doll intended for boys
- My Buddy (album), 1983 album by Rosemary Clooney
- My Buddy: Sonny Stitt Plays for Gene Ammons, 1976
- My Buddy: Etta Jones Sings the Songs of Buddy Johnson, 1998
- "My Buddy" (song), a 1922 popular song
- "My Buddy" (G-Unit song), from the 2003 album Beg for Mercy
- My Buddy (film), a 1944 American crime film
