= Brock Winkless =

American puppeteer

- Born: N. Brock Winkless IV; October 12, 1959; United States
- Died: July 18, 2015 (aged 55); Los Angeles, California, U.S.
- Occupations: Puppeteer; visual effects technician
- Years active: 1988–2001
- Notable work: Child's Play

N. Brock Winkless IV (October 12, 1959 – July 18, 2015) was an American puppeteer and visual effects technician. He was the puppeteer of Chucky in the 1988 horror film, Child's Play, and its first three sequels, as well as the puppeteer of the Crypt Keeper in several episodes of the HBO television series, Tales from the Crypt.

== Career ==
He was known for his attention to detail on his puppets and other creations. Make-Up Artist Magazine noted that Winkless "was one of the few people who understood and excelled at lipsyncing a puppet's mouth and jaw movements, which made him invaluable for projects such as the Child's Play series, as well as the Crypt Keeper character from the Tales from the Crypt television show."

Winkless frequently collaborated with Kevin Yagher, a film director and make-up artist, including the Child's Play series, the Crypt Keeper, and Honey, I Blew Up the Kid. Winkless also partnered with Stan Winston Studio, AnimatedFX Inc., which is owned by Dave Nelson and Norman Tempia, and Rick Baker's Cinovation Studios for make-up and visual effects during his career.

Winkless was best known as the lead puppeteer of Chucky, the evil, murderous doll in Child's Play. He was also credited as one of Chucky's puppeteers on several sequels in the Child's Play franchise, including Child's Play 2 in 1990, Child's Play 3 in 1991, and Bride of Chucky in 1998. Winkless was also the puppeteer of the Crypt Keeper in the television series, Tales from the Crypt and its related film, Tales from the Crypt Presents: Demon Knight in 1995. He also performed the puppetry for The Crypt Keeper's cameo appearance in 1995's Casper.

Aside from Chucky and The Crypt Keeper, Winkless was a puppeteer during the productions of Honey, I Blew Up the Kid in 1992, Death Becomes Her in 1992, Man's Best Friend in 1993, Congo in 1995, The X-Files, and Dr. Dolittle 2 in 2001.

Winkless was a member of the mechanical department for James Cameron's 1991 film, Terminator 2: Judgment Day, starring Arnold Schwarzenegger. He also worked on the visual and special effects for Meet the Applegates in 1990, Alien 3 in 1992, and Children of the Corn III: Urban Harvest in 1995.

== Death ==
Winkless died from complications of multiple sclerosis in Los Angeles, California, on July 18, 2015, at the age of 55. He had suffered from a loss of muscle control due to the condition for more than 15 years.

== Filmography ==
- Mac and Me (1988) - Alien Puppeteer
- Child's Play (1988) - Puppeteer of Chucky
- Child's Play 2 (1990) - Puppeteer of Chucky
- Meet the Applegates - Creature effects
- Terminator 2: Judgment Day (1991) - Mechanical department
- And You Thought Your Parents Were Weird (1991) - Robot builder
- Bill & Ted's Bogus Journey (1991) - Puppeteer
- Child's Play 3 (1991) - Puppeteer of Chucky
- Honey, I Blew Up the Kid - Puppet/makeup effects artist
- Alien³ (1992) - Alien creature effects
- Death Becomes Her (1992) - Puppeteer
- Harry and the Hendersons (1993) - Puppeteer
- Man's Best Friend (1993) - Puppeteer
- Tales from the Crypt (1989–1995) - Puppeteer
- Tales from the Crypt: Demon Knight (1995) - Puppeteer
- Children of the Corn III: Urban Harvest (1995) - Additional special makeup effects
- Casper (1995) - Puppeteer of Crypt Keeper
- Congo (1995) - Puppeteer
- Bordello of Blood - Puppeteer of Crypt Keeper
- The X Files (1998) - Puppeteer
- Bride of Chucky (1998) - Puppeteer of Chucky
- Dr. Dolittle 2 (2001) - Puppeteer
