= Chucky (Child's Play) =

Main character of the Child's Play franchise

- Child's Play character
- Chucky as he appears in the TV series
- First appearance: Child's Play (1988)
- Created by: Don Mancini
- Portrayed by: Brad Dourif Various: Young: David Kohlsmith (young Charles; TV series); Tyler Barish (teenage Charles; TV series); Fiona Dourif (adult Charles; TV series); Possessed: Fiona Dourif (possessed; Cult of Chucky and TV series); Devon Sawa (possessed; TV series); Rosemary Dunsmore (possessed; TV series); Zackary Arthur (possessed; TV series)
- Voiced by: Brad Dourif Various: Mark Hamill (Reboot film and Robot Chicken)
- Performed by: Ed Gale (in-suit performer; films 1, 2 and 4); Debbie Lee Carrington (in-suit performer; Curse of Chucky); Brock Winkless (puppetry; from Child's Play to Bride of Chucky); Tony Gardner (puppetry; from Seed of Chucky to the TV series)

In-universe information
- Full name: Charles Lee Ray
- Alias: The Lakeshore Strangler
- Nicknames: Chucky; Charlie
- Spouse: Tiffany Valentine
- Children: Glen Tilly; Glenda Tilly
- Relatives: Elizabeth Ray (mother); Peter Ray (father)
- Religion: Haitian Vodou
- Classification: Serial killer
- Notable adversary: Andy Barclay; Kyle; Nica Pierce; Jake Wheeler; Lexy Cross; Devon Evans
- Allies: Tiffany Valentine (current); Caroline Cross (current); Wendell Wilkins (current); Dr. Amanda Mixter (deceased); Eddie Caputo (deceased); John Aelsop Bishop (deceased); Junior Wheeler (deceased); Sister Ruth (deceased)
- Status: Alive

Chucky, originally known as Charles Lee Ray, is a fictional character and the main antagonist of the Child's Play franchise. He first appeared in Child's Play (1988) as a vicious serial killer who transfers his soul into a "Good Guy" brand doll using voodoo magic. Chucky was created by writer Don Mancini and is primarily voiced by Brad Dourif. The character has subsequently been represented in various other media, including novels, video games, and comic books.

== Appearances ==
=== Original series ===
==== Child's Play (1988) ====
Chucky as seen in Child's Play (1988)

Chucky first appeared in the 1988 film Child's Play. In the film, a serial killer named Charles Lee Ray (Brad Dourif), known as "The Lakeshore Strangler" and also by the nickname "Chucky", uses a voodoo ritual to transfer his soul into a Good Guy brand doll after being shot by Detective Mike Norris (Chris Sarandon). Pretending to be an inanimate object, Chucky later is given to young Andy Barclay (Alex Vincent) by his mother Karen Barclay (Catherine Hicks) and begins terrorizing the family. Chucky learns that he can only become human again by possessing the first person he told his real name to- Andy. The Barclays and Norris eventually kill Chucky by setting him on fire and shooting him.

==== Child's Play 2 (1990) ====
In Child's Play 2, Chucky is repaired by Play Pals Inc., creator of the Good Guy dolls, leading to his resurrection. Chucky continues his pursuit of Andy, who has been placed in foster care. Andy is terrorized at his new home and at school, leading to the deaths of his teacher (Beth Grant), case worker (Grace Zabriskie) and foster parents (Jenny Agutter, Gerrit Graham). Meanwhile, Andy's foster sister Kyle (Christine Elise) learns that Chucky is alive. Chased to the Good Guy doll factory, Andy and Kyle kill Chucky by partially melting him with molten plastic and then blowing his head up with an air-hose.

==== Child's Play 3 (1991) ====
In Child's Play 3, Chucky is inadvertently resurrected eight years later when a splash of his blood is mixed with molten plastic being used to produce new Good Guy dolls. He finds that a now teenage Andy (Justin Whalin) is currently enrolled at a military academy. Chucky attempts to possess the body of a young boy named Tyler, but is stopped by Andy and his love interest Kristin de Silva (Perrey Reeves), with his body being shredded apart by a giant fan.

==== Bride of Chucky (1998) ====
A month after Andy destroyed Chucky at a carnival and was taken into custody, Chucky is reconstructed and resurrected by his former girlfriend Tiffany Valentine (Jennifer Tilly). When Tiffany learns Chucky had no intentions of marrying her, she holds him captive. Chucky escapes, kills Tiffany and transfers her soul into a female doll. Chucky explains that in order for them to transfer their souls again, they need a magical amulet called the Heart of Damballa, which was buried with his body in Hackensack, New Jersey. Tiffany calls and convinces her neighbor Jesse (Nick Stabile) to take the dolls to Hackensack.

With his girlfriend Jade (Katherine Heigl), Jesse takes the dolls to Hackensack, with Chucky and Tiffany killing multiple people along the way. The dolls also have sex one night, unknowingly impregnating Tiffany. Chucky and Tiffany take Jesse and Jade hostage to be their new host-bodies, but Tiffany has a change of heart and betrays Chucky. Chucky kills her before being shot to death by Jade. Shortly after, an infant doll crawls from Tiffany's corpse, attacking a police officer.

==== Seed of Chucky (2004) ====
Several years after the events of Bride of Chucky, Chucky and Tiffany's gender confused and pacifistic living-doll child (voiced by Billy Boyd) tracks their bodies down to Hollywood, Los Angeles, where their bodies have been rebuilt as props for a horror film based on the "urban legend" of Chucky the doll. The child uses the Heart of Damballa to resurrect the pair. Realizing their child has no obvious gender, Chucky proclaims the child a boy and names him "Glen," while Tiffany insists the child is a girl and names her "Glenda."

Tiffany decides to transfer her soul into her favorite actress, Jennifer Tilly, whom Chucky impregnates with his semen to create a body for Glen/Glenda. Tiffany learn that Glen/Glenda actually has two distinct personalities- the peaceful male Glen and the murderous female Glenda. Jennifer gives birth to twins, allowing both personalities to have a body of their own, while Chucky decides he doesn't want to transfer his soul into a human anymore. Angered by his change of heart, Tiffany leaves Chucky. A vengeful Chucky tracks down and kills Tiffany, not realizing she had already swapped spirits with Jennifer. Glen, believing his mother dead, murders Chucky with an axe.

Five years later, Glen and Glenda have transferred their souls into Jennifer and Chucky's babies while Tiffany now masquerades as Jennifer. Glen discovers his father is still alive when his disembodied arm appears and attacks him.

==== Curse of Chucky (2013) ====
Nine years after the main events of the previous film, Chucky arrives at the house of the paraplegic Nica Pierce (Fiona Dourif) and her mother Sarah. Chucky kills Sarah and several of Nica's other family members who come to visit. He reveals himself to Nica and explains that in 1988, he became obsessed with Sarah and took her hostage after killing her husband. When the police arrived, Chucky became convinced Sarah was somehow responsible and stabbed her pregnant belly, causing Nica's paralysis. He was then tracked down and shot by detective Norris, leading to the events of the original film.

Chucky, using anecdotal evidence from the murders, frames Nica and manages to escape. He travels to visit Nica's niece Alice to take over her body. Sometime later, Chucky (still in his doll form) tries to kill his old nemesis Andy Barclay (Alex Vincent), only for Andy to ambush him with a shotgun.

==== Cult of Chucky (2017) ====
Four years after the events of the previous film, Chucky returns to torment a now institutionalized Nica, while Andy Barclay attempts to stop his plans once and for all. Chucky kills numerous other inmates at the asylum, continuing to frame Nica for the murders. Andy becomes confused at the prospect of this latest murder-spree, as he still has the living head of the Chucky that tried to ambush him.

Chucky eventually reveals that he found a new spell that allows him to split his soul and possess multiple different bodies. He possesses Nica (restoring her ability to walk) and kills her sexually abusive psychologist at the asylum before escaping with Tiffany. Meanwhile, Andy ends up locked in a room at the asylum after he traveled there to kill all of the Chucky dolls.

Later, Andy's former foster sister Kyle arrives at his home to torture the Chucky head he still has.

==== Chucky (2021–2024) ====
The television series Chucky acts as a sequel, following the events of Cult of Chucky.

In the first season, Chucky is purchased by 14-year-old Jake Wheeler (Zackary Arthur) at a yard sale. After Jake learns who Chucky is and his intentions, he teams up with his crush Devon Evans (Björgvin Arnarson) and bully-turned-friend Lexy Cross (Alyvia Alyn Lind) to stop him. Chucky kills several of the kids' parents and is able to complete a voodoo ritual that allows him to possess an army of Good Guy dolls. While several of the Chucky dolls are killed, the rest escape, taking Andy Barclay hostage.

In the second season, Jake, Devon and Lexy are sent to a Catholic reform school after Chucky kills Jake's new foster-brother and frames them. The three manage to take one of the Chuckys hostage and brainwash him into being a "Good Chucky," while most of the other Chuckys are killed by The Colonel, a psychopathic and cannibalistic Chucky. The kids save Andy from The Colonel's cabin, and he kills the doll. Good Chucky's spirit is sent to hell after he begins to have violent episodes (including killing a fellow reform student who befriended the group), while Chucky Prime (the original Chucky) possessing Nica is removed from her body through an exorcism and escapes in a new doll body. Meanwhile, Lexy's sister Caroline begins to believe that Tiffany and Chucky are her "real family" and runs away with Tiffany.

In the third season, the last remaining Chucky begins to age rapidly when he is abandoned by Damballa due to the exorcism in the previous season. Learning that the only way he can get back Damballa's support is to perform a series of ritualistic murders in a place of great evil, Chucky infiltrates the White House and begins killing staff members. Jake, Devon and Lexy, desperate to find Caroline, befriend the son of the president in order to infiltrate the home and stop Chucky. Chucky is eventually able to win back Damballa's favor, restoring his body. He reproposes to Tiffany, bringing the two back together; they drive away with Caroline while Jake, Devon and Lexy's spirits are trapped in marionettes by the original Good Guy doll designer, the psychopathic Wendell Wilkins (John Waters).

=== Reboot film ===
In the 2019 reboot, Chucky (voiced by Mark Hamill) is a high-tech artificially-intelligent "Buddi" doll created by the Kaslan Corporation. Primarily designed to be a life-long companion to its owner by learning from its surroundings, Buddi dolls can also connect to and operate other Kaslan products.

Chucky has his safety protocols disabled by a disgruntled Kaslan employee during the assembly process, and as a result, Chucky gradually develops violent tendencies as he tries to eliminate anyone stopping him from being "best friends" with his owner Andy Barclay (Gabriel Bateman). Together with his mother and some of his friends, Andy is eventually able to kill Chucky and burn his remains. However, another Kasland doll elsewhere begins to malfunction, hinting that Chucky's consciousness may have transferred into it.

=== In popular culture ===
==== Film ====
A short film entitled Chucky's Vacation Slides was included on the home media release of Seed of Chucky in 2005, and in 2013, a series of short film videos titled Chucky Invades were released leading up to the DVD release of Curse of Chucky. The clips showed Chucky interrupting the events of Psycho, The Purge, Mama, and Drag Me to Hell.

Chucky has a brief cameo as a program in the OASIS virtual reality simulation in the film adaptation of Ready Player One (2018).

==== Television ====
Chucky presented an examination of foreign language horror films for the first annual Horror Hall of Fame in 1990. In October 1998, Chucky confronted Gene Okerlund and Rick Steiner for an episode of WCW Monday Nitro and appeared on Saturday Night Live as well, both appearances were used to promote Bride of Chucky. Chucky returned to Saturday Night Live in 2022, with Sarah Sherman portraying him. Chucky appeared in the fourth episode of Robot Chicken titled "Plastic Buffet", where he is voiced by Mark Hamill. He also made various appearances in The Simpsons. In October 2021, Chucky co-hosted NXT: Halloween Havoc. Chucky returned at NXT Halloween Havoc in October 2022. A Chucky Yule Log was uploaded onto YouTube on December 22, 2022, and later on Peacock the following year.

==== Literature ====
Tie-in novelizations of Child's Play 2 and Child's Play 3 were written by author Matthew J. Costello and published in 1990 and 1991 respectively. The novelizations are notable for making some changes to the plots and Chucky's character. For example, Chucky is characterized to have an absent father and abusive mother with Dwarfism in the Child's Play 2 novelization, and his resurrection and death are substantially different in the Child's Play 3 novelization.

==== Comics ====
Beginning in 1990, Innovation Publishing released the first comic books based on the films, in the form of a three-issue adaptation of Child's Play 2. The success of the adaptation led to a monthly series of new stories starting in 1991. The series, titled Child's Play, ended in 1992 after only five issues. This was followed by a three-issue adaptation of Child's Play 3.

In 2007, Devil's Due Publishing obtained the license to publish Child's Play comics and released a one-shot crossover with Hack/Slash titled Hack/Slash vs. Chucky which takes place after the events of Seed of Chucky and features Chucky as the main antagonist. This was followed by a four-issue series titled Chucky. A second volume began in early 2009 but ceased publication after only one issue.

==== Video games ====
Chucky's first video game appearance was in the 2013 endless runner game titled Chucky: Slash & Dash, developed and published by Slimstown Studios for mobile. He later appeared as a playable character in Dead by Daylight, Roblox, Funko Fusion, Call of Duty: Warzone, and Call of Duty: Black Ops 6. Zen Studios released Chucky's Killer Pinball, a pinball table for Pinball M on November 30, 2023.

==== Universal theme park attractions ====
Since 1992, Chucky has starred in his own shows at Universal's Halloween Horror Nights, entitled, Chucky's In-Your-Face Insults, Chucky's Insult Emporium, and Late Night with Chucky. In 2009, the climax of Child's Play 3 received its own maze, entitled Chucky's Fun House in which he appears. Curse of Chucky has also received its own Scarezone in the 2013 lineup where he also appeared. In 2017, Chucky was the host of the Hollywood event's Terror Tram, joining Freddy Krueger, Jason Voorhees, and Leatherface in terrorizing guests as promotion for Cult of Chucky. The following year, he featured in his own Scarezone at the Orlando event. In 2023, Chucky received a Haunted House based on the television series.

== Backstory ==
=== Events prior to Child's Play (1988) ===
Brad Dourif as Charles Lee Ray, the Lakeshore Strangler, in Child's Play (1988)

Charles Lee Ray was born on May 1, 1957, in Hackensack, New Jersey, to Peter and Elizabeth Ray. In contrast to his claims that killing had been in his family for "generations", Charles is shown to have had a loving family growing up.

However, unknown to his parents, Charles suffered from sadistic and homicidal urges. When Charles returned home from trick-or-treating on Halloween in 1964, he noticed a razor blade stuck inside an apple. He bit into it regardless, allowing the razor to cut his mouth. On his eighth birthday in 1965, Charles behaved aggressively, using a mallet to knock a piñata to the ground and violently smash it.

Sometime later, a local serial killer known as "The Hackensack Slasher" broke into his home and killed his father. Entranced, Charles used a pocketknife to stab his mother to death, happily telling the Hackensack Slasher that he "helped." Impressed by the boy's actions, the Hackensack Slasher gave him advice on always covering his tracks. Charles was placed in the Burlington County Home for Wayward Boys. He received therapy from a woman named Dr. Amanda Mixter. Instead of helping young Charles, the psychotic Mixter encouraged him to embrace his homicidal tendencies.

Charles became known for playing with the smaller children at the home, and attempted to mold three boys into following his murderous footsteps, teaching them swear words and reading them fairy tales twisted to revolve around death. One day, he murdered a janitor and presented his body to the children, horrifying all of them with the exception of a young boy named Eddie Caputo. Charles later fled the home, leaving the janitor's severed hand behind as a gift for Eddie.

In 1986, Charles picked up a woman named Delilah and a red-headed woman from a nightclub and brought them back to a hotel. When Charles threatened the red-headed woman with a knife, he was shocked to find her sexually aroused. Ray then chose to kill Delilah instead, stabbing her and passing the knife to the red-head woman to join in. After killing her together, red-headed woman introduced herself as Tiffany. Charles (now going by "Chucky") and Tiffany became a couple and left Hackensack in 1987.

In 1988, Chucky and Tiffany had relocated to Chicago, Illinois. Chucky became an infamous serial killer known as "The Lakeshore Strangler", with both Tiffany and Eddie as accomplices. Chucky also began studying Voodoo under the guidance of a man named John Bishop.

While at a neighborhood barbecue, Chucky was introduced to a woman named Sarah Pierce and her family. He becomes obsessed with Sarah and killed her husband Daniel before kidnapping her. Around the same time, tensions rose between both Chucky and Tiffany when she found out Chucky was killing people without her. After one last argument, Tiffany called the police, telling them Chucky's whereabouts.

The police discovered Chucky holding Sarah hostage. Believing she had somehow turned him in, Chucky stabbed Sarah in the stomach, which would leave her unborn child Nica Pierce paralyzed from the waist down, before fleeing the scene. He is later chased down by Police Detective Mike Norris, leading to the events of the original film.

== Concept and creation ==
=== Design ===
Child's Play creator and co-writer Don Mancini explained that Chucky draws heavily from the My Buddy dolls: "In my original script, he was originally called Buddy, and we couldn't use it because of the 'My Buddy' doll. The director went out and got a 'My Buddy' doll, a Raggedy Ann, a Raggedy Andy, and one of those life-size baby infants. What I told [designer] Kevin Yagher was, I wanted something similar to a My Buddy doll. I described "Buddy" in my original script, now "Chucky", as wearing red-buttoned overalls, red sneakers, striped sweater, with red hair, blue eyes, and freckles. Kevin went off and sketched many designs of Chucky until the final was picked. Yagher then built the first doll from those sketches and my details".

=== Performance ===
For the first four films, Chucky was controlled by a team of nine puppeteers, led by Brock Winkless, who moved Chucky's mouth via radio control, wearing a rig that captured his mouth movement. The others were in charge of operating the doll's head, face, and limbs. By Curse of Chucky, Chucky's mouth, now performed by lead puppeteer Tony Gardner of Alterian, Inc., was now operated via a radio-control unit without the need for a rig, and the doll himself now required fewer people to bring him to life. For the first film, for scenes where Chucky had to move around in wide shots, a little-person actor in a life-sized costume, Ed Gale, would portray Chucky in scenes where the character is walking, the props on the set enlarged to fit the size of the actor.

== See also ==
- Killer toys
