= Ed Gale =

American actor, stunt performer and sex offender (1963–2025)

- Born: Edward Gale; August 23, 1963; Plainwell, Michigan, U.S.
- Died: May 27, 2025 (aged 61); Los Angeles, California, U.S.
- Occupations: Actor; stunt performer
- Years active: 1986–2022

Edward Gale (August 23, 1963 – May 27, 2025) was an American actor and stunt performer who appeared in films and television series primarily between 1986 and 2013. He was notably the physical performer of Chucky in Child's Play (1988), Child's Play 2 (1990), and Bride of Chucky (1998).

== Early life ==
Gale was born with dwarfism. He was born in Plainwell, Michigan, and graduated from Plainwell High School. His parents were Robert Allison and Beverly Ann (Whitmore) Gale, but from age 14 to 21 he resided with the Babbitt family of Plainwell.

== Career ==
His debut was as the title role of Howard in the 1986 film Howard the Duck. While Chip Zien provided Howard's voice, Gale was the primary actor in the duck-like suit to portray the comic book character.

In 1988, he played Chucky in the horror film Child's Play. He went on to appear in two other films in the franchise.

He played the dinosaur Tasha in the short-lived television series Land of the Lost (1991). In 2002, he had a supporting role as Matthew McConaughey and Gary Oldman's characters' uncle Bobby Barry in Tiptoes, a film that revolves around a family of people with dwarfism. Gale appeared in a minor role in the American television sitcom My Name Is Earl. The episode, titled "Little Bad Voodoo Brother," aired in 2006 and featured Gale as a carnival performer named "Little Eddie."

== Sexual misconduct conviction ==
In April 2023, Gale was accused by a group of online predator-hunters of attempting to solicit sex from multiple minors, one male among whom he allegedly believed to be 14 years old. He had his smartphones seized by the Los Angeles Police Department (LAPD) during a home visit on April 19, but was at that time neither charged nor arrested. It was soon revealed Gale had admitted to the group that he at that time had recently been "sexting" and attempting to "hook up" with an underage 14-year-old boy, and that he had in the past also had sexual conversations with at least 10 other people who he assumed were minors. Until his death, he remained under investigation by the LAPD and the Los Angeles County District Attorney. Following Gale's death, a spokesperson for the Los Angeles County District Attorney's office revealed to People that a case had been referred to the Los Angeles City Attorney's office in September 2023, but only for a possible misdemeanor filing.

In 2024, he pleaded guilty to one charge of contacting a minor with intent to commit a specified sex offense and registered as a sex offender.

== Death ==
Gale died at a Los Angeles hospice on May 27, 2025, at the age of 61.

== Selected filmography ==
=== Film ===
Year	Title	Role	Notes
1986	Howard the Duck	Howard T. Duck	In-suit performer
1987	Spaceballs	Dink	
1988	Child's Play	Chucky	In-suit performer/stunts
1989	Chopper Chicks in Zombietown	Bob Littleton	
1990	Child's Play 2	Chucky	In-suit performer/stunts
1991	Dolly Dearest	The Doll	
1991	Bill & Ted's Bogus Journey	Station (alongside Arturo Gil)	
1994	The Jungle Book	Baby Baloo	
1998	Bride of Chucky	Chucky	In-suit performer/stunts
2000	O Brother, Where Art Thou?	Little Man	
2000	The Adventures of Rocky and Bullwinkle	The Mole	In-suit performer
2002	Tiptoes	Bobby Barry	
2004	The Polar Express	Elf	Voice and motion capture
2005	L.A. Dicks		
2007	Marksman	Tony Valino	Short
2009	The Gold & the Beautiful	Eddie	
2010	Speed-Dating	Willlie	Uncredited
2010	Santa Preys for X-mas	Dick the Elf	Video short
2011	The Amateur Monster Movie	Reporter Mel Tambor	Voice
2011	365 Days	Mr. Thomas	Direct-to-video
2013	Mikeyboy	Pizza Shop Owner	
2013	Crazy Town	Pat	Short
2020	Pandemonic	Artist	
2022	In Search of Tomorrow	Himself	Documentary

=== Television ===
Year	Title	Role	Notes
1988	Friday the 13th: The Series	Oscar	Episode: "Read My Lips"
1990	The Dreamer of Oz	Ned Brown/Farmer	Television film
1991–1992	Land of the Lost	Tasha, Magas	26 episodes
1993	Lifepod	Q-Three	Television film
1994	Baywatch	Simon McKay	Episode: "Short Sighted"
1994–1998	Weird Science	Genie Master, Little Person, Wyatt Primate	3 episodes
1995	Pig Sty	Jack, Leprechaun	Episode: "Erin Go Barf"
1996	The Munsters' Scary Little Christmas	Larry	Television film
1996	Townies	Butch, Disgruntled Elf	Episode: "Christmas"
1997	Family Matters	Carlsbad	Episode: "Stevil II: This Time He's Not Alone"
1998	3rd Rock from the Sun	Oscar	Episode: "Dr. Solomon's Traveling Alien Show"
1998	Maggie	Chanter	Episode: "Ka-Boom"
1999	Norm	Pikachu	Episode: "Artie Comes to Town"
1999	Sabrina the Teenage Witch	Powell	Episode: "Sabrina, Nipping at Your Nose"
2000	The Christmas Secret	Kevin	Television film
2001	Just Shoot Me!	Jimmy	Episode: "Christmas? Christmas!"
2001	Grounded for Life	Jesus	Episode: "I Saw Daddy Hitting Santa Claus"
2001	Call Me Claus	Benson	Television film
2002	Santa Jr.	Stan	Television film
2002	The Hughleys	Mr. Briggs	Episode: "I Have a Scheme"
2002	First Monday	Melvin Meyers	Episode: "The Price of Liberty"
2002	The District	Hank Tarver	Episode: "Small Packages"
2007	My Name Is Earl	Midget Prisoner	Episode: "Randy in Charge: Of Our Days and Our Nights"
2009	Bones	Lavalle	Episode: "Double Trouble in the Panhandle"
2012	Emerald Acres	Zeus	Television film
2014	Deadly Attraction	Mr. Thomas	TV mini-series
