= Demon Knight =

1995 film by Ernest Dickerson

- Theatrical release poster
- Directed by: Ernest Dickerson
- Written by: Ethan Reiff Cyrus Voris; Mark Bishop
- Based on: Tales from the Crypt by EC Comics
- Produced by: Gilbert Adler
- Starring: Billy Zane; William Sadler; Jada Pinkett; Brenda Bakke; C. C. H. Pounder; Thomas Haden Church
- Cinematography: Rick Bota
- Edited by: Stephen Lovejoy
- Music by: Edward Shearmur
- Production company: Crypt Keeper Productions
- Distributed by: Universal Pictures
- Release date: January 13, 1995
- Running time: 92 minutes
- Country: United States
- Language: English
- Budget: $12 million
- Box office: $21.1 million

Tales from the Crypt Presents: Demon Knight is a 1995 American horror comedy film directed by Ernest Dickerson from a screenplay by Mark Bishop, Ethan Reiff and Cyrus Voris. It stars Billy Zane, William Sadler, Jada Pinkett, Brenda Bakke, C. C. H. Pounder, Dick Miller, and Thomas Haden Church.

Demon Knight is a feature-length film presented by the HBO series Tales from the Crypt, and features scenes with the Crypt Keeper (voiced by John Kassir, as in the series) at the film's beginning and ending. The film was met with mostly mixed reviews. It was followed by a second standalone Tales from the Crypt film, Bordello of Blood (1996).

== Plot ==
The film has a wraparound intro and outro by the Crypt Keeper, who states that the story centers upon an isolated area in New Mexico, where several people live in a decommissioned church converted into a boarding house. One of its residents, Willy the local drunk, has brought home a drifter named Frank Brayker, who was recently in a car crash that, unbeknownst to Willy, was caused by a powerful demon in human form, The Collector.

The Collector follows Brayker to the house after possessing the local townspeople. He initially tries to obtain the artifact via trickery, only to turn to violence when that fails. Brayker secures the house by using an artifact containing the blood of Jesus Christ. The home's occupants, which include a convict on work release named Jeryline, start plotting an escape route that would require them to utilize abandoned mining tunnels that run underneath the house and entire town. During this, Brayker explains that his artifact is actually one of seven keys that demons used to focus the power of the cosmos into their hands. His key is the last one they need to obtain, requiring the protection of unageing guardians. Each guardian refills the artifact with their own blood once they die, so that the next guardian will have a steady supply of blood.

The escape attempt proves to be unsuccessful, however the survivors discover a young boy named Danny taking refuge in the tunnels and bring him back to the boarding house. As the night progresses, the survivors are picked off one by one until only Jeryline, Danny, and Brayker are left alive. The Collector then possesses Danny and mortally wounds Brayker, forcing Jeryline to kill the boy. Before he dies, Brayker initiates Jeryline as a guardian of the key. This deactivates all of the wards that Brayker set up, allowing The Collector access to the home. The Collector easily obtains the key from Jeryline and offers to spare her by letting her remain at his side. When she doesn't reply, he tries to attack her, only for her to spit blood from the key in his face, causing him to revert to his actual demon form before being destroyed.

In the morning, Jeryline refills the key with Brayker's blood and leaves town. As she leaves, Jeryline spots a new demon, who she realizes will pursue her just as The Collector pursued Brayker. In a post-credits scene, the Crypt Keeper announces a sequel titled Dead Easy: also known as Fat Tuesday.

== Cast ==
- Billy Zane as The Collector
- William Sadler as Frank Brayker
- Jada Pinkett as Jeryline
- Thomas Haden Church as Roach
- C. C. H. Pounder as Irene
- John Kassir as voice of The Crypt Keeper
  - Brock Winkless as The Crypt Keeper's puppeteer
- Brenda Bakke as Cordelia
- Dick Miller as Uncle Willy
- Gary Farmer as Deputy Bob
- Ryan O'Donohue as Danny
- Charles Fleischer as Wally
- John Schuck as Sheriff Tupper
- Sherrie Rose as Wanda
- Chasey Lain as Party Babe
- Traci Bingham as Party Babe
- Mark David Kennerly as Other Collector
- Tim DeZarn as Homer
- John Larroquette as Slasher (uncredited)

== Production ==
Unlike episodes of the HBO series, the story was not adapted from the pages of EC Comics. The first draft of the script was written in 1987, two years prior to the HBO series' debut. It was first intended to be made into a film by director Tom Holland, who planned to shoot it as a follow-up to Child's Play (1988). Holland hired an FX team to do preliminary sketches, but he ultimately went on to direct the box-office bomb Fatal Beauty (1987).

Next, the script wound up in the hands of Pumpkinhead screenwriter Mark Carducci, who sat on it for several years before it was given to Pet Sematary director Mary Lambert. Lambert had some radical ideas for the script, including casting an African American as Brayker to create a theme that the oppressed people of Earth were also its saviors. Once Lambert went on to direct Pet Sematary Two, which was a theatrical bomb, she could not get people to invest in the film.

The script later went to Charles Band's Full Moon Features, but budgetary constraints held up the production in limbo. When it finally made its way onto desks at Joel Silver's Silver Pictures, it was optioned to be the second in a trilogy of Tales from the Crypt theatrical spin-offs. Universal Pictures executives thought the script had more potential than the other two films (Dead Easy and Body Count, neither of which was ultimately produced), and the film was quickly sent into production that summer, with a tentative release date set for Halloween 1994 (though it was pushed back to January 1995).

At this point, two versions of the script were created to solve budgetary problems: one with demons and one without. In the latter, the Collector was a Bible salesman who was using a legion of fellow salesman clad in black suits and sunglasses (later revealed to be demons) as his minions. A film called Demon Knight with demons that looked like killer yuppies made everyone nervous, so Universal pitched in some additional money to get some demons on the screen.

== Release ==
The film was originally released on LaserDisc in 1995 followed by its release on VHS and DVD in 1996 and 2003 respectively. It was also released as part of a double pack with Bordello of Blood (1996), the following Tales from the Crypt film. In October 2015, it was released on Blu-ray by Scream Factory. The Blu-ray retains the post-credits scene, unlike other home media releases and the Horror Channel broadcasts.

== Reception ==
On the review aggregator website Rotten Tomatoes, 45% of 40 critics' reviews are positive, with an average rating of 4.7/10. The website's consensus reads: "The usual pulp delights of Tales from the Crypt are too few and far between in Demon Knight -- a disappointingly slack and by the numbers siege flick." Variety wrote that it is "neither funny enough nor scary enough to be fully satisfying as either a shocker or a spoof". Stephen Holden of the New York Times wrote that it half-succeeds at being chilling and funny. David Kronke of the Los Angeles Times called the film "a direct-to-video affair" that was given a theatrical release based on the strength of the franchise. Owen Gleiberman of Entertainment Weekly rated it D+ and wrote: "Is there anything more dispiriting than trash that flaunts its lack of conviction?" Walter V. Addiego of the San Francisco Examiner called it "a slime-and-gore fest that offers little but a few outrageous sick jokes and the chance to make a mental list of all the horror movies from which it borrows". Edward Guthmann of the San Francisco Chronicle wrote that, though the film is dull and slow-paced, he was overall positive to the film. In a retrospective, Chris Eggertsen of Bloody Disgusting called it "one of the most underrated genre entries of the '90s".

== Tie-in media ==
=== Soundtrack ===
A soundtrack containing heavy metal, Hip-hop, industrial metal, glam metal, hardcore punk and alternative rock was released on January 10, 1995, by Atlantic Records. It peaked at 157 on the Billboard 200.

=== Novelization ===
A movie novelization was released alongside the film. Written by Randall Boyll, the book featured several changes from the film version. These changes include cutaways by the Crypt Keeper during the story, different deaths for some of the film characters, and a burgeoning romance between Jeryline and Brayker. Bryan W. Collins of Fangoria reviewed the novel in a 2025 look back at the book, noting that it was a "disappointing take on the material."

== Sequels ==
Demon Knight was intended to be the first in a series of Tales from the Crypt branded films. The next was to be Dead Easy, which was to be a New Orleans zombie romp that would release the following Halloween. This film did not come to fruition and Universal instead released Bordello of Blood in 1996. A third film, Ritual, was released in 2002. The movie was not initially produced or released as a Tales from the Crypt film, the movie was given a re-release with Tales from the Crypt branding. An intro featuring the Crypt Keeper was also added.
