= My Buddy (doll) =

Toy brand

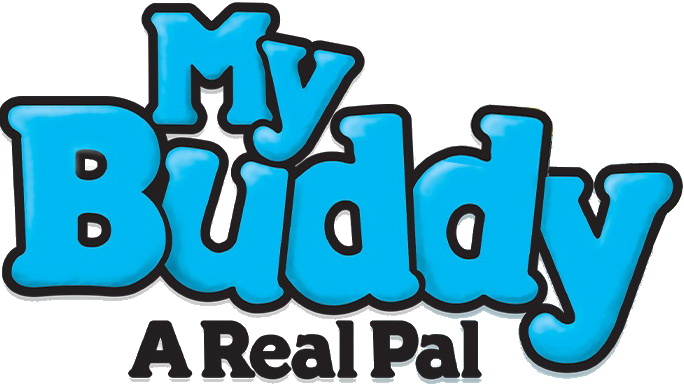
- Type: Doll
- Company: Hasbro (1985–?)
- Availability: 1985––

My Buddy was a doll line brand made by Hasbro in 1985 with the intention of making a doll to appeal to young boys and teach them about caring for their friends. This idea was both innovative and controversial for its time, as toy dolls were traditionally associated with younger girls.

My Buddy is one of several dolls said to be the inspiration for Chucky, the evil doll from Child's Play.

The doll was jokingly depicted as My Stalker in an episode of Adult Swim's Robot Chicken.

In September 2024, The Loyal Subjects ("TLS Toys") signed a deal with Hasbro to relaunch a host of legacy brands, including My Buddy. An 18-inch remake of the original doll was officially released in February 2025.
