= Bride of Chucky =

1998 American slasher film by Ronny Yu

- Theatrical release poster
- Directed by: Ronny Yu
- Written by: Don Mancini
- Based on: Characters by Don Mancini
- Produced by: David Kirschner; Grace Gilroy
- Starring: Jennifer Tilly; Brad Dourif; Katherine Heigl; Nick Stabile; John Ritter
- Cinematography: Peter Pau
- Edited by: Randy Bricker; David Wu
- Music by: Graeme Revell
- Production company: David Kirschner Productions
- Distributed by: Universal Pictures (United States, Canada and South Korea); Good Machine (International)
- Release date: October 16, 1998
- Running time: 89 minutes
- Country: United States
- Language: English
- Budget: $25 million
- Box office: $50.7 million

Bride of Chucky is a 1998 American black comedy slasher film written by Don Mancini and directed by Ronny Yu. The fourth installment in the Child's Play franchise, it stars Jennifer Tilly, Brad Dourif, John Ritter, Katherine Heigl, and Nick Stabile. Unlike the first three films, Bride of Chucky takes a markedly humorous turn towards self-referential parody. It also departs from the Andy Barclay storyline of the first three films, focusing mainly on series villain Chucky, a doll possessed by a serial killer, and his former lover and accomplice Tiffany, whose soul is also transferred into a doll.

Bride of Chucky was released on October 16, 1998, by Universal Pictures. The film received mixed reviews from critics and grossed over $50 million worldwide on a budget of $25 million, becoming the highest-grossing film of the series. A sequel, Seed of Chucky, was released in 2004.

== Plot ==
One month after Andy Barclay destroyed Chucky at a local carnival, (Note: As depicted at the ending of Child's Play 3 (1991)) in Lockport, New York, Tiffany Valentine, Chucky's ex-girlfriend and accomplice, bribes police officer Bob Bailey into selling her Chucky's remains. After murdering Bailey, she repairs the doll in her trailer and performs a voodoo ritual to revive him. Chucky later springs to life and kills Tiffany's goth admirer, Damien Baylock, much to her delight. Soon after, the couple get into an argument when Tiffany learns Chucky never wanted to marry her. Tiffany angrily locks Chucky in a playpen and taunts him by giving him a bride doll. Chucky later escapes and fatally electrocutes Tiffany before using a voodoo spell to transfer her soul into the bride doll in an act of vengeance.

Chucky explains that if they want to escape their doll bodies, they must retrieve a magical amulet called the Heart of Damballa that was buried with his human body. They decide the best bodies to inhabit are Tiffany's handsome neighbor Jesse Miller and his girlfriend Jade Kincaid. Tiffany calls and asks Jesse to drive the two dolls to Hackensack, New Jersey where Chucky's body is buried in exchange for a thousand dollars. Eager to marry Jade and needing money, Jesse accepts. Jade's strict uncle, police chief Warren Kincaid, tries to have Jesse arrested by planting a bag of marijuana in his van. Chucky and Tiffany seemingly kill him and hide his body in the van before he and Jade begin their trip, oblivious to the murder. The two are quickly pulled over by Officer Norton, one of Kincaid's cohorts, who finds the marijuana. When Norton returns to his patrol car to report it, Chucky ignites the car's gas tank, blowing it up and killing Norton.

Jesse and Jade flee and begin to suspect each other of killing Norton. Nevertheless, they marry. Kincaid briefly springs back to life, but Chucky finally kills him by stabbing him to death. While at a hotel, Jesse's wallet is stolen by another couple and Tiffany murders them in an act of petty revenge. Seeing this, Chucky realizes he's in love with Tiffany. He proposes marriage to her and they have sex. The following morning, Jesse and Jade's friend David arrives and joins their trip. David informs them that they are the prime suspects for the deaths, but he believes them innocent. After finding Warren's body however, David thoughtlessly becomes convinced they are both murderers and holds them at gunpoint. When Chucky and Tiffany finally reveal they're alive and threaten David with their own guns, a startled David gets himself hit by a truck, killing him.

Chucky and Tiffany steal an RV to evade the police. Jesse and Jade instigate a domestic dispute between Chucky and Tiffany to distract them. In the commotion, Jade kicks Tiffany into the RV's oven while Jesse pushes Chucky out the window. Eventually, Chucky is able to get the upper hand and acquires the amulet at his exhumed grave while also taking both Jesse and Jade hostage. As Chucky begins the ritual, Tiffany has a change of heart and decides she doesn't want to hurt Jesse and Jade. She attempts to kill Chucky, but he overpowers and stabs her to death. As he's distracted, Jesse knocks him into the grave. Private investigator Lt. Preston, who has been following the case, arrives and sees Chucky alive in the grave, shocking him. Jade steals his gun and empties it into Chucky, killing him.

After declaring the couple innocent, Preston sends them on their way. Tiffany springs briefly back to life and starts screaming, giving birth to a baby doll which attacks Preston.

== Cast ==
- Jennifer Tilly as Tiffany
- Brad Dourif as Chucky (voice)
  - Rebecca Brenner as Good Guy Chucky (voice; uncredited)
- Katherine Heigl as Jade Kincaid
- Nick Stabile as Jesse Miller
- Alexis Arquette as Damien Baylock/Howard Fitzwater
- Gordon Michael Woolvett as David Collins
- John Ritter as Chief Warren Kincaid
- Lawrence Dane as Lt. Preston
- Michael Louis Johnson as Norton
- James Gallanders as Russ
- Janet Kidder as Diane
- Vince Corazza as Officer Bob Bailey
- Kathy Najimy as Dottie the Motel Maid
- Park Bench as Stoner
- Emily Weedon as Girl at One-Stop
- Ben Bass as Lt. Ellis
- Roger McKeen as Justice of the Peace
- Sandi Stahlbrand as Reporter

== Production ==
=== Pre-production ===
After the release of Child's Play 3, Don Mancini and David Kirschner decided that the series required a new direction, and decided against returning the character of Andy Barclay. Work on the film began in 1996, with the working title Child's Play 4: The Return of Chucky, inspired by the release of Scream. Mancini said, "Like most genres, the horror genre goes in cycles and I think we can thank Kevin Williamson and Scream for reinvigorating the market. Over the years, I had been imagining new scenarios for this series. With his previous successes, we knew it was just a matter of time before we'd be bringing Chucky back and David Kirschner and I both felt that it was important to bring him back in a new way -- we wanted to elevate the series and re-invent it, go beyond what we'd done before. And what we've ended up with is—incredibly—part horror, part comedy, part romance and part road movie. It's a really cool blend of the genuinely creepy and the really funny." Ronny Yu was hired to direct the film in January 1998 after Kirschner and Mancini were "amazed" by his film The Bride with White Hair, and was allowed to use his creative freedom and the ability to hire his collaborators Peter Pau and David Wu from Hong Kong. The inspiration to create a girlfriend for Chucky came from David Kirschner after he saw a copy of the classic Bride of Frankenstein in a video store. Mancini loved the idea and created Tiffany. He said, "After all, two dolls running around the country together and killing people a la Natural Born Killer Dolls or Bonnie and Clyde is really pretty funny." Mancini chose Tilly as his first choice to play Tiffany, after being impressed with her in Bound and Bullets Over Broadway. Gina Gershon, Tilly's co-star in Bound, encouraged her to take the role. In retrospect, Mancini commented: "Once we introduced Jennifer Tilly's character [...] that brought a certain comedic camp vibe [to the franchise], which I think is kind of historically a hallmark of gay culture," referring to the increasing use of LGBTQ+ characters in later Chucky films and TV series. Several months before production actually began on the film, Kevin Yagher and his team began to create animatronic puppets for Chucky and Tiffany. For Chucky alone, nine different puppets were used.

=== Filming ===
Jennifer Tilly provided Tiffany's voice-over dialogue during a three-day recording session held in tandem with Brad Dourif just prior to the start of principal photography. Bride of Chucky was filmed over a twelve-week period in and around Toronto, Canada. Over half of the film was shot on the sound stage. Exterior locations that were used included the Clifton Hill strip in Niagara Falls, an art deco motel complex on Toronto's waterfront, an old army camp in Oshawa, and numerous rural areas.

Each doll required seven puppeteers to manipulate, a computer playback operator, and a puppet coordinator to act as liaison between the operators and the director. Three puppeteers handled the movement of each doll's facial features which were relayed through the use of a radio-controlled transmitter. All of the dolls' other below-the-head movements were cable-operated by the rest of the puppeteers. The dolls' skin featured a combination of silicone and foam latex, unlike the previous Child's Play films, where the dolls were only made of foam latex, a material that had to be painted in a way that made it very difficult to light.

Brock Winkless, who is among the 17 puppeteers who worked on this film, returned as the puppeteer of Chucky for the last time. Ed Gale and Debbie Lee Carrington performed in-suit as Chucky and Tiffany (credited as Chucky Double and Tiffany Double) respectively during the graveyard scene.

== Soundtrack ==
1. The Screamin' Cheetah Wheelies – "Boogie King"
2. White Zombie – "Thunder Kiss '65"
3. Coal Chamber – "Blisters"
4. Monster Magnet – "See You in Hell"
5. Judas Priest – "Blood Stained"
6. Type O Negative – "Love You to Death"
7. Slayer – "Human Disease"
8. Stabbing Westward – "So Wrong"
9. Powerman 5000 – "The Son of X-51"
10. Bruce Dickinson – "Trumpets of Jericho"
11. Static-X – "Bled for Days"
12. Motörhead – "Love for Sale"
13. Kidneythieves – "Crazy" (Willie Nelson cover)
14. Graeme Revell – "We Belong Dead"

=== Score ===
The film's music was composed and conducted by Graeme Revell, who previously composed the music for Child's Play 2. Revell reused the theme from the second film within the music and it was performed by the Hollywood Studio Symphony.

On March 31, 2023, Enjoy the Ride Records and Back Lot Music released Revell's complete score on digital and in a limited-edition vinyl pressing. It was produced by Mike Matessino and is a 140-gram vinyl 2xLP album with screen printed D side. It includes a gatefold jacket featuring new artwork created by Garreth Gibson, and Voodoo For Dummies replica double-sided insert.

Original Motion Picture Score - Side A
No.	Title	Length
1.	"Break In (Main Title from the Motion Picture "Bride of Chucky")"	2:28
2.	"Hello Dolly"	1:21
3.	"Incantation"	1:25
4.	"Damien Putz"	3:12
5.	"Captive"	1:57
6.	"That's Our Chucky"	1:16
7.	"Re-United"	1:00
8.	"He Hasn't Changed"	0:48
9.	"A Doll to Play With - You're Dead"	1:44
10.	"Chucky's March/Chucky Attacks/She's Alive"	2:28

Side B
No.	Title	Length
11.	"Voodoo for Dummies"	1:41
12.	"Warren Lurking Satan's Little Helper/Fitup"	2:04
13.	"Airbags Can Be Dangerous"	1:16
14.	"Harassment"	1:02
15.	"The Master at Work"	3:14
16.	"Getaway/Warren's Back/The Honeymoon"	1:59
17.	"Death by Mirror"	1:24
18.	"Plastic Love"	2:22
19.	"Housemaid"	1:04
20.	"Dolls Take Charge"	1:39

Side C
No.	Title	Length
21.	"Exhumation/Domestic Bliss"	1:23
22.	"What Would Martha Stewart Say"	1:19
23.	"Tiffany Gets Baked/Escaping The Wreck"	2:04
24.	"The Amulet/Hostage Exchange"	4:13
25.	"Tiffany Kills Chucky"	1:46
26.	"Doll Fight/Jade Kills Chucky"	2:34
27.	"Child's Play 5"	1:40
28.	"End Credits (From the Motion Picture "Bride of Chucky")"	1:19

== Release ==
Bride of Chucky was released in North America on October 16, 1998, by Universal Pictures.

=== Marketing ===
To promote the film, Chucky made an appearance on the October 12, 1998 episode of WCW Monday Nitro as a heel. He interrupted a promo between Gene Okerlund and Rick Steiner and, in addition to asking viewers to watch the film, mentioned that he was hoping for Scott Steiner to win an upcoming match between the brothers.

=== Home media ===
The film was released on VHS and DVD on March 23, 1999, by Universal Studios Home Video.

== Reception ==
=== Box office ===
The film grossed $11.8 million on its opening weekend. It has a total North American gross of $32.4 million and another $18.3 million internationally. It is the highest-grossing film of the Chucky franchise and the second most financially successful Chucky film in the US.

=== Critical response ===
On the review aggregator website Rotten Tomatoes, the film has an approval rating of 47% based on 45 reviews, with an average rating of 5.6/10. The site's critics consensus reads, "Bride of Chucky is devoid of any fright and the franchise has become tiresomely self-parodic, although horror fans may find some pleasure in this fourth entry's camp factor." Metacritic, which uses a weighted average, assigned the film a score of 48 out of 100, based on 17 critics, indicating "mixed or average" reviews. Audiences polled by CinemaScore gave the film an average grade of "B" on an A+ to F scale.

Lawrence Van Gelder, writing for The New York Times, gave the film a mostly negative review, writing that "the novelty of a bloody horror film built around a malevolent doll carrying the soul of a serial killer has worn thin." Lisa Schwarzbaum of Entertainment Weekly gave the film a grade of "D", calling it an "upchucking of cartoonish gore" that "leans heavily on self-referential gags". Xan Brooks of The Independent gave the film a score of two out of five, writing: "Bride of Chucky strings together a series of humorous asides and knee-jerk shock tactics."

The Los Angeles Times' John Anderson wrote that "Ronny Yu milks the utter inanity of Chucky's existence for all it's worth and knows the conventions of the genre well enough that horror fans should feel total gratification--in the levels of both mayhem and grotesque humor." Mick LaSalle of the San Francisco Chronicle wrote that "No one will confuse Bride of Chucky with a classic like Bride of Frankenstein, but anyone looking for nasty laughs will be delighted." Marc Savlov of The Austin Chronicle gave the film a score of three-and-a-half out of five stars; he commended its visuals and "witty, pithy script", and wrote: "this fourth entry in the killer doll franchise is by far and away the best, a surprisingly affecting tale of pint-sized love and dismemberment that's remarkably well-done."

Brad Dourif has said Bride of Chucky is his personal favorite film in the series.

=== Accolades ===
List of awards and nominations
Award	Category	Winner/Nominee	Result
Saturn Awards	Best Horror Film	Bride of Chucky	Nominated
Saturn Awards	Best Actress	Jennifer Tilly	Nominated
Saturn Awards	Best Writing	Don Mancini	Nominated
Fantafestival	Best Actress	Jennifer Tilly	Won
Fantafestival	Best Special Effects	Bride of Chucky	Won
Gérardmer Film Festival	Special Jury Prize	Ronny Yu	Won
MTV Movie Awards	Best Villain	Chucky	Nominated

== Legacy ==
The film garnered a cult following, marked by its distinctive influence, while also establishing a devoted queer fan base which set the tone for future installments.

=== Sequels ===
The film was followed by Seed of Chucky in 2004, Curse of Chucky in 2013, Cult of Chucky in 2017, and the TV series Chucky in 2021.
