= Child's Play (1988 film) =

1988 film by Tom Holland

- Theatrical release poster
- Directed by: Tom Holland
- Screenplay by: Don Mancini; John Lafia; Tom Holland
- Story by: Don Mancini
- Produced by: David Kirschner
- Starring: Catherine Hicks; Chris Sarandon; Alex Vincent; Brad Dourif
- Cinematography: Bill Butler
- Edited by: Edward Warschilka; Roy E. Peterson
- Music by: Joe Renzetti
- Production companies: United Artists; David Kirschner Productions
- Distributed by: MGM/UA Communications Co.
- Release date: November 9, 1988
- Running time: 87 minutes
- Country: United States
- Language: English
- Budget: $9–13 million
- Box office: $44.2 million

Child's Play is a 1988 American supernatural slasher film directed by Tom Holland, from a screenplay he co-wrote with Don Mancini and John Lafia based on a story by Mancini. The film stars Catherine Hicks, Chris Sarandon, Alex Vincent, and Brad Dourif as Charles Lee Ray and the voice of Chucky. The plot follows a widowed mother who gives a new doll to her son, unaware that it is possessed by the soul of a serial killer.

Child's Play was released in the United States on November 9, 1988, by MGM/UA Communications Co. through its United Artists label. It received generally positive reviews from critics and grossed more than $44 million against a production budget of $9 million. Along with the film gaining a cult following, the box office success also spawned a media franchise that includes a series of six sequels, a television series, merchandise, novels, comic books, a video game, and a reboot. The original Child's Play film was distributed by United Artists, although the rights to the series were sold to Universal Pictures in 1990. MGM (via United Artists) retained the rights to the original film and Orion Pictures (through United Artists Releasing) also distributed the reboot in 2019. A sequel, Child's Play 2, was released in 1990.

== Plot ==
Police Detective Mike Norris chases fugitive serial killer Charles Lee Ray, nicknamed as the "Lakeshore Strangler", through the streets of Chicago and into a toy store while Ray's accomplice, Eddie Caputo, flees the scene with Norris' partner, Jack Santos, pursuing him. Shot by Norris and dying, Ray invokes the power of Damballa and casts a voodoo spell to transfer his soul into a nearby Good Guy-brand talking doll. The store is struck by lightning, causing an explosion. Shortly thereafter, Norris finds Ray's lifeless body next to the doll.

A Good Guy Chucky doll as seen in the film

Widow Karen Barclay's six-year-old son Andy wants a Good Guy doll for his birthday, but she was not able to save up enough to afford one. At work, her best friend Maggie Peterson informs her that a homeless peddler outside has gotten his hands on a Good Guy. Karen excitedly buys the doll and gives it to Andy. He is immediately captivated by the doll, who introduces itself as "Chucky".

That night, Maggie babysits Andy while Karen covers another employee's shift. Chucky comes to life and attacks Maggie, striking her in the head with a hammer and causing her to fall out of a window to her death on a truck. Karen returns home to the crime scene where Norris is serving as lead detective. Norris believes Andy may have been involved in Maggie's murder, while Andy claims that Chucky may have been involved. Andy tells his mother that Chucky told him his real name was "Charles Lee Ray".

The next day, Chucky convinces Andy to skip school and take a train ride to a bad neighborhood. Chucky sneaks into an abandoned home where Caputo is hiding out and kills him in a gas explosion in revenge for abandoning him. Andy is discovered by police and again considered a suspect, and Karen is informed that he will be admitted to a psychiatric hospital for observation. Karen returns home with Chucky and discovers that the doll has been moving and speaking without batteries. After Karen threatens to throw him into the fire, Chucky violently comes alive and attacks her, then escapes. Karen goes to Norris, but he does not believe her story.

Karen finds the peddler and asks for more information, but he attempts to rape her; Norris saves her and forces the peddler to admit that he stole the doll from the destroyed toy store where Norris killed Ray. Norris, still skeptical, is later attacked by Chucky. He shoots the doll, whose wound inexplicably bleeds and causes pain. Chucky escapes to his former voodoo instructor John "Dr. Death" Bishop, demanding answers; John informs him that the longer his soul remains in the doll, the more "human" the doll will become. He refuses to help and is tortured by Chucky with a voodoo doll, forcing him to reveal that in order to escape the doll's body, he must transfer his soul to the first human he revealed his true identity to: Andy. Chucky leaves as Karen and Norris arrive and find John bleeding out. Before succumbing to his injuries, John tells them that in order to kill Chucky, they must destroy his heart.

Chucky arrives at the psychiatric hospital and kills Andy's doctor with an electroshock therapy device. Andy flees home, where Chucky knocks him out. As Chucky prepares to possess Andy, Karen and Norris arrive. Chucky wounds Norris, but Karen and Andy gain the upper hand, setting him on fire. A burned Chucky attacks again, but Karen shoots his head and several of his limbs off, appearing to kill him. Jack arrives, refusing to believe the trio until Chucky's body bursts through a heat vent and attacks Jack. Norris shoots Chucky's body through the heart, finally killing him. The group leaves to get the wounded Norris to the hospital as a traumatized Andy looks back at Chucky's burned remains.

== Cast ==
Brad Dourif as Charles Lee Ray in a publicity photograph for the film

- Catherine Hicks as Karen Barclay
- Chris Sarandon as Detective Mike Norris
- Alex Vincent as Andy Barclay
- Dinah Manoff as Maggie Peterson
- Tommy Swerdlow as Jack Santos
- Jack Colvin as Dr. Ardmore
- Neil Giuntoli as Eddie Caputo
- Raymond Oliver as John "Dr. Death" Bishop
- Brad Dourif as Chucky / Charles Lee Ray
  - Edan Gross as Friendly Chucky (voice)
  - John Franklin as Walkabout Chucky
  - Ed Gale as Chucky (in-suit performer)

Additionally, Alan Wilder appears as Walter Criswell and Edan Gross portrays a young boy in a commercial promoting the dolls.

== Production ==
=== Development ===
According to an interview with Mental Floss, screenwriter Don Mancini first conceived of the concept while studying as a literature major at UCLA in 1985. He wrote the first draft of the screenplay while studying film at Columbia University in 1986. Mancini was inspired by the consumerism of the 1980s and the effect of marketing on children based on his experiences with his father, an advertising executive, and the Cabbage Patch riots of 1983. Mancini's troubled relationship with his own father and his experiences of alienation as a gay man caused him to center the script around a child with a single mother and no father figure. He was also influenced by the Cabbage Patch Kids, Trilogy of Terror, Magic, Poltergeist, the character of Freddy Krueger from A Nightmare on Elm Street and The Twilight Zone episode "Living Doll". The director Tom Holland has also affirmed that the My Buddy dolls played a role in Chucky's design, with the writers having to change the doll's name from Buddy to Chucky to avoid a lawsuit from Hasbro.

Charles Band expressed interest in filming the script at Empire Pictures and later produced both Don Mancini's first film Cellar Dweller (1988) and the Puppet Master franchise. However, he did not purchase the rights to Mancini's script because it would have been too expensive for his studio to make. Initially no other studios were interested. However David Kirschner, who would produce all seven films and the television series in the Child's Play franchise, agreed to fund it. Kirschner wanted to make a film about a killer doll after reading The Dollhouse Murders and to branch out from children's entertainment after producing An American Tail (1985). Kirschner sent Mancini's second draft and his drawings of the doll to major studios, and attracted more interest due to the success of An American Tail and his links with Steven Spielberg. United Artists won a bidding war to produce the film after studio president Tony Thomopoulous, who would serve as uncredited executive producer of the film, and MGM/UA Communications Chairman Lee Rich realized that it could begin a long-running franchise.

=== Writing ===
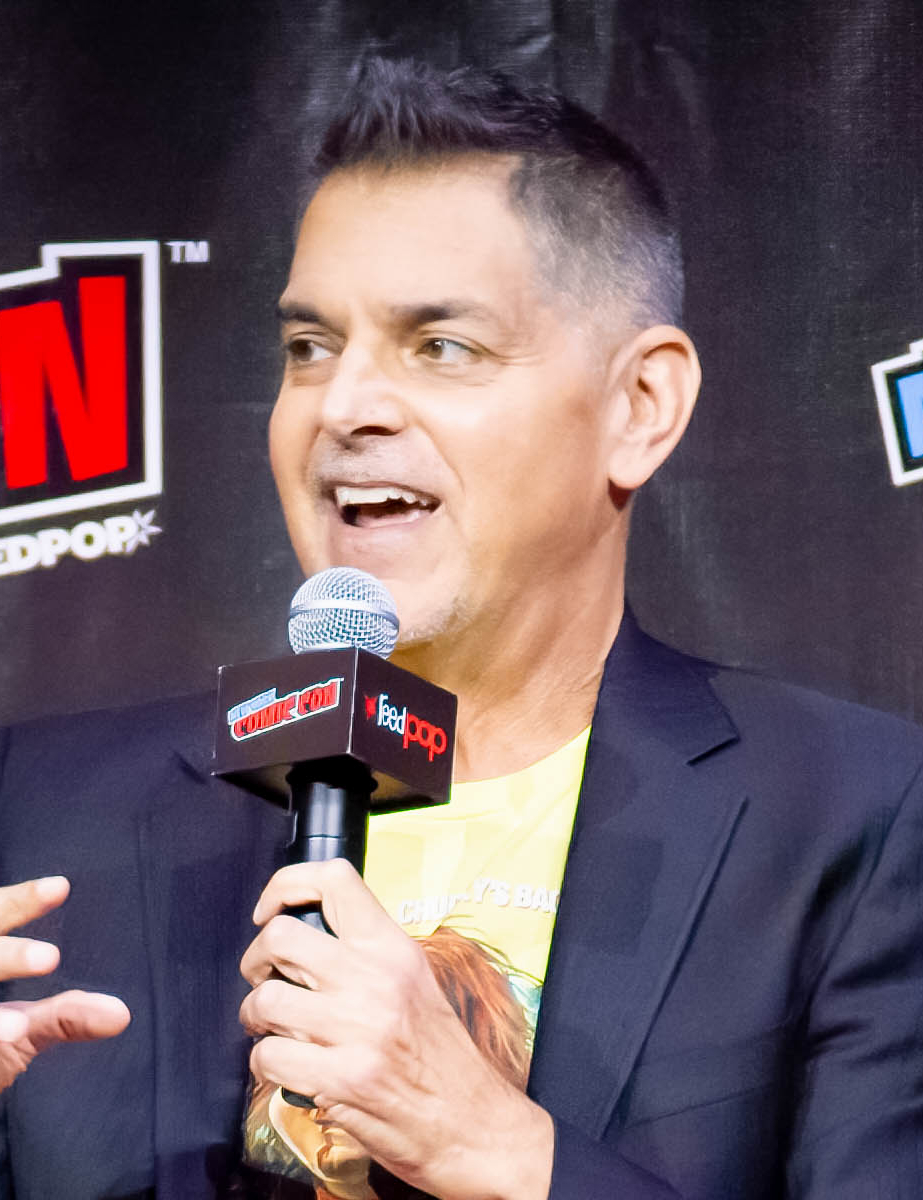
Screenwriter Don Mancini (pictured in 2022)

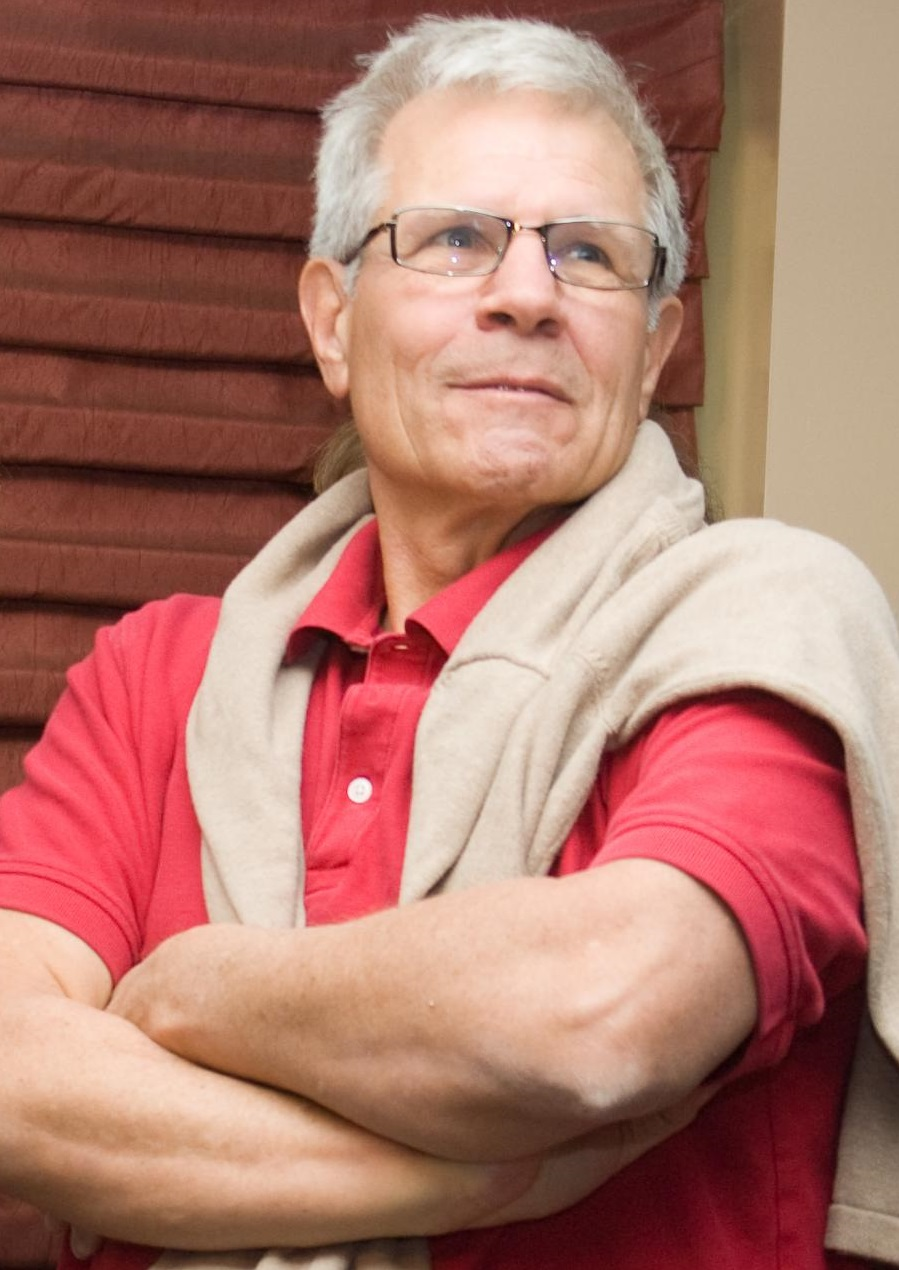
Director Tom Holland (pictured in 2008) was brought on to direct, with many revisions to Mancini's original screenplay

Mancini's original script was titled Batteries Not Included, with the title later changed to Blood Buddy after it was discovered that a different film with the same name was being made. It would have featured a doll filled with fake blood that would allow it to bleed if played with roughly, and it would have started coming alive while Andy was asleep after he mixed his own blood with the doll's. The doll would have represented Andy's subconscious rage caused by his parents' divorce and his single mother's frequent absence from home, and would have targeted his enemies. The third act would have had the doll trying to kill Andy and his mother so that it would not have to go to sleep while Andy was awake. Mancini's original script would have been a whodunit story which dealt with the effect of advertising and television on children. Mancini's original script was also written to toy with the audience a bit longer, making it ambiguous whether Andy or Chucky was the killer.

Although Kirschner enjoyed Mancini's script, he requested extensive rewrites because he feared that having the doll be a manifestation of Andy's subconscious anger would make the protagonist too unsympathetic to audiences. He also believed that parents would not be willing to buy their children a doll that bled. MGM/UA was not confident enough in Mancini to allow him to do the rewrites. Kirschner hired Tom Holland to rewrite and direct the film based upon Steven Spielberg's recommendation from his work on Amazing Stories. Holland came up with the idea that the doll would be possessed by a serial killer. Kirschner named the new character Charles Lee Ray based on Charles Manson, Lee Harvey Oswald, and James Earl Ray. Ray and his accomplice Eddie Caputo would be based on the "Hillside Stranglers" Angelo Buono Jr. and Kenneth Bianchi.

However, Holland had trouble coming up with a new plot for the film and how Ray's soul would possess the doll in the story. Holland ultimately quit the project in order to direct Fatal Beauty (1987), and MGM/UA nearly cancelled the film. However, Kirschner and Laura Moskowitz hired John Lafia to complete the new script after he responded to their request to the William Morris Agency. In Lafia's rewritten script Charles Lee Ray's soul would have been transferred to the Buddy doll after being executed by electric chair as the doll was being manufactured on an assembly line. The script featured the doll factory where Buddy was produced, which would be recycled for the second film.

Lafia wanted to direct the film himself but was turned down because he had never directed a feature-length motion picture, and the studio sought an experienced director for the production. William Friedkin, Irvin Kershner, Robert Wise, Joseph Ruben, and Howard Franklin were all approached to direct. Ruben and Franklin were both nearly hired, with Franklin doing rewrites on the script. It is unknown if any of his contributions made it into the film, although he is not credited. Rocky Morton and Annabel Jankel were attached to co-direct together and started penning rewrites themselves but were dismissed after Jankel became pregnant.

Holland was rehired as writer-director after the completion of Fatal Beauty and performed a final extensive rewrite on the script. Holland's screenplay moved the setting from a middle-class suburban home to a working-class urban apartment in either Chicago or New York City, changed Karen Barclay from an advertising executive to a department store clerk, and identified that Charles Lee Ray had transferred his soul to the doll via Voodoo magic with help from Damballa. Although Kirschner and Mancini both disliked the Voodoo subplot, this would be the screenplay used for the film. Holland argued that his final rewrite was so extensive that it was completely original from earlier drafts of the film and attempted to claim sole credit. Lafia and Mancini disputed this, and a Writers' Guild of America arbitration panel ruled that the three should share credit with Mancini receiving a special "Story by" credit. Lafia later accused Holland of rewriting the film merely to claim sole writing credit and claimed that previous versions of the screenplay had been better. He, Holland, and Mancini also disputed which of the three was most responsible for creating the character of Chucky for the rest of their lives.

Maggie's death was originally going to be by electrocution while taking a bath. The idea was abandoned, and was later used in Bride of Chucky (1998).

=== Casting ===
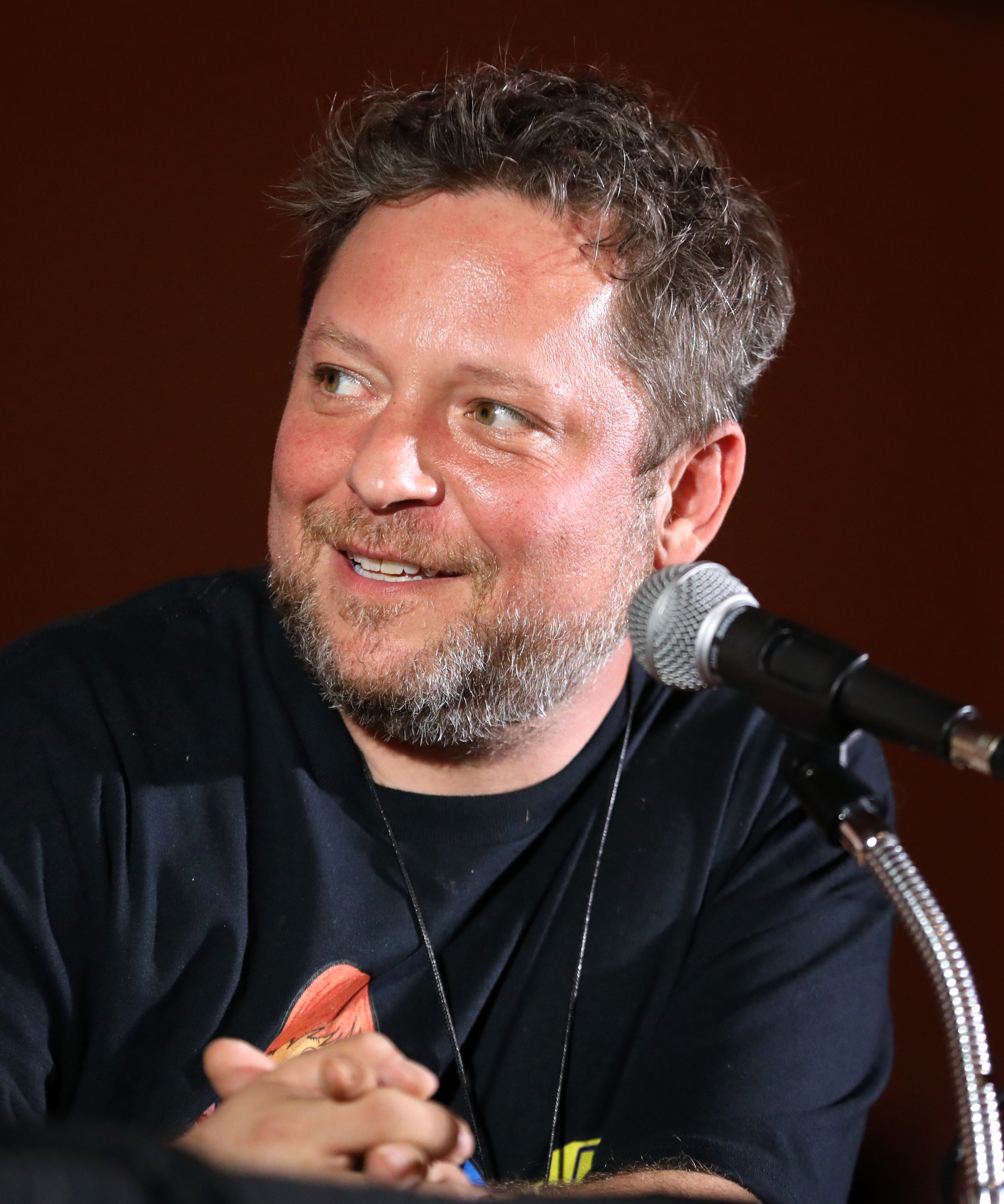
Alex Vincent (pictured in 2024) was cast as Andy Barclay

Auditions for roles in the film began in November 1987 at the Hollywood United Methodist Church. Holland immediately cast Chris Sarandon as Detective Norris after working with him in his first film Fright Night (1985). Catherine Hicks was hired as Karen Barclay on the recommendation of Leonard Nimoy, who worked with her in Star Trek IV: The Voyage Home (1986). Holland considered hundreds of children from across the United States for the role of Andy Barclay. Despite his lack of acting experience compared with the other two finalists, Alex Vincent was cast as Andy Barclay in his second audition after he convincingly pretended to forget his lines in order to avoid cursing in front of his mother.

John Lithgow was considered to play Charles Lee Ray before Brad Dourif was hired after Holland worked with him in Fatal Beauty. Ed Gale was hired to play the body of Chucky, although ultimately he only appeared a few times to supplement animatronics. Initially the voice of Chucky's doll form was intended to be a simple electronic overlay similar to ordinary toys with sound chips. When this was deemed infeasible, John Franklin was hired to record the dialogue when Dourif was initially unavailable to record Chucky's voice because of his involvement in Mississippi Burning. After negative test screenings, Lafia and Holland decided to recast the role only to find Dourif was still unavailable due to his involvement in Spontaneous Combustion. They cast Jessica Walter to voice Chucky on the basis that Mercedes McCambridge had voiced Pazuzu in The Exorcist. Later, Walter's recordings were discarded when Dourif returned to the film. Unlike Walter, part of Franklin's performance remains in the film through a scene in which he appears as a human television presenter dressed as a Good Guy, a scene which was shot after his replacement.

=== Filming ===
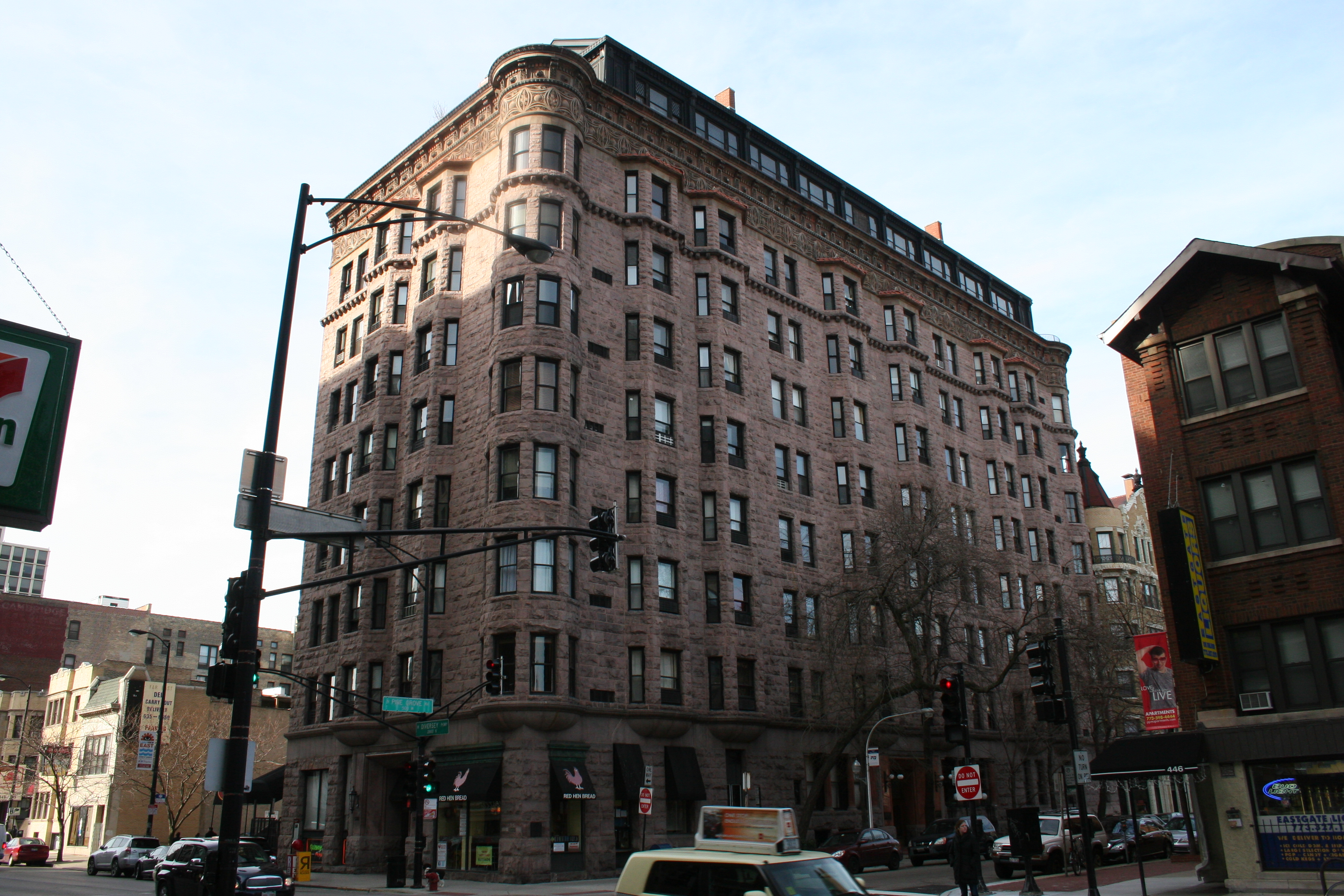
The Brewster Apartments, (pictured in 2012) served as the location of Karen and Andy's apartment

Principal photography began on December 31, 1987, and wrapped on March 5, 1988, with a budget of $9–13 million. Mancini and Lafia never entered the set and were minimally involved in the production. Although Mancini claimed this was due to the 1988 Writers Guild of America strike, it was more likely because they feared they would not be welcome since the strike did not begin until several days after principal photography ended. Child's Play was filmed on location in Chicago. MGM/UA executives attempted to convince Kirschner to move the film's setting to California to cut costs, but he declined after becoming dissatisfied with scouting trips to Oakland and San Francisco.

The Brewster Apartments, a Chicago landmark located at Diversey Parkway and Pine Grove Avenue, served as the location of the apartment where Andy and Karen lived and is pictured on the film's poster. In-studio filming took place at Culver Studios in Culver City, California. The Playland Toys shop was filmed on 418 South Wabash Avenue, while Eddie's home was filmed in a North Chicago house that the city had condemned to be demolished. The department store Karen worked at was filmed at the Carson, Pirie, Scott and Company Building. The on-location filming was conducted in the winter with a wind chill reaching as low as −50 °F (−46 °C), forcing the production to rent entire rooms and park running station wagons near shooting locations as warming centers. The mental hospital which Andy is detained at later in the film was shot at the abandoned Municipal Contagious Disease Hospital in South Lawndale and the Illinois Eastern Hospital for the Insane in Kankakee, Illinois. For that scene, Holland got Vincent to cry by telling him that his parents were getting divorced because of him. Although Holland claimed Vincent knew he was lying and Vincent also defended Holland as an adult, Kirschner criticized Holland's treatment of Vincent and claimed that it at times "bordered on cruelty to children."

Chucky was controlled by a team of nine different puppeteers, led by Brock Winkless, who moved Chucky's mouth via radio control, wearing a rig that captured his mouth movement. The others were in charge of operating the doll's head, face, and limbs. By Curse of Chucky (2013), Chucky's mouth, now performed by lead puppeteer Tony Gardner of Alterian, Inc., was operated via a radio-control unit without the need for a rig, and the doll himself now required fewer people to bring him to life. For scenes where Chucky had to move around in wide shots, a little-person actor in a life-sized costume, Ed Gale, would portray Chucky in scenes where the character is walking, the props on the set enlarged to fit the size of the actor.

=== Visual effects ===
The film used various ways to portray Chucky, including radio-controlled animatronics operated by up to nine puppeteers, extras of short stature, and child actors. Kirschner initially hired Chris Walas to handle the puppetry for the film after his work on Gremlins (1984), but he quit in order to direct The Fly II (1989). After Rick Baker declined to act as Walas's replacement, Kirschner put Kevin Yagher in charge of the puppetry for the film. Various animatronics and cosmetics were used for every scene. Throughout the film, Chucky transitions from appearing as a normal toy to appearing more human, with his hairline receding throughout the film. The film created multiple Chucky animatronics such as a flailing tantrum Chucky, a walking Chucky, and a stationary Chucky. Gale claims that the filmmakers were not sure how well the animatronics would work and shot most scenes with both him and the puppets. The animatronic doll's face was controlled via remote control through a rig capturing facial movement on puppeteer Brock Winkless. For some scenes Holland used short-statured actors and children such as Ed Gale and Alex Vincent's sister Ashley with forced perspective sets.

=== Test screening ===
The film initially received negative reviews after a two-hour rough cut was shown to audiences at a test screening. Kirschner and Mancini subsequently cut 25 minutes of the film to reduce the amount of time Chucky was on screen, something Kirschner had advocated for during production to build suspense in a similar fashion to Jaws or Alien. Holland, who had repeatedly clashed with Kirschner over Chucky's amount of time on screen and the film's tone during shooting, objected to the cuts and left the production. Mancini and Lafia were invited back to help re-edit the film.

The three have also suggested that the test screening flopped due to their use of Franklin as the doll's voice. Although Holland and Lafia enjoyed Franklin's performance, test audiences felt it was excessively humorous and did not fit the serious tone of the film. Although they and Mancini found Walter's voice more suitably menacing, they decided she was unable to convey the humor intended for the character, and all of her lines were redubbed with Dourif's voice. The cut footage, shown only in production stills and the film's script, would have featured Charles Lee Ray stalking a drunk woman as a human only to discover it to be Mike Norris on an undercover sting operation, Andy showing Chucky around his room and finding a photograph of his deceased father, John healing an infant through a voodoo ritual, and Chucky unsuccessfully trying to break into Andy's room at the mental hospital and tricking a mentally-ill girl named Mona into carrying him into the ward.

The script also featured an alternate ending in which Chucky is stabbed by Andy with a knife mounted on a radio-controlled car and has his face and legs melted with a squirt gun filled with Drano in addition to being lit on fire and shot repeatedly by Mike and Karen. Chucky would have been seemingly killed by being overpowered by Jack and several police officers. While storing Chucky's remains in an evidence room, another cop would have disbelieved Jack's assertion that the doll was alive, and after they left, Chucky's disembodied arm would have come to life to swat a fly.

=== Music ===
The score was composed by Joseph Renzetti which featured a collection of electronic and orchestral elements. Although UA and Holland had planned for the film to have a fully orchestral score, Renzetti wanted an electronic soundtrack. Renzetti and his colleague Craig Harris ultimately composed most of the music on a synthesizer and then converted the MIDI output to musical notes for the orchestra to play. Portions of the soundtrack were released on vinyl in 1989 and was later followed up by another vinyl pressing by Waxwork Records that featured the complete score from the original master tapes. According to music supervisor David Chackler, Renzetti composed the score in just three weeks.

== Release ==
Although Kirk Kerkorian terminated MGM/UA's production agreement with Kirschner during his acquisition of the studio, it agreed to release Child's Play after the recut of the film received positive test screenings in Southern California. MGM/UA made a controversial decision not to release the film during Halloween, in order to avoid competition with competing horror films such as Halloween 4: The Return of Michael Myers. It instead moved the release date closer to Veterans Day weekend.

The film was heavily promoted for three weeks before release through television spots emphasizing audience reactions directed towards 12-20-year-olds and intended to "position Chucky as the new terror icon". The film was released on Wednesday, November 9, 1988, in 1,377 theaters, opening at number one with $6,583,963 in its opening weekend and $8,002,841 in its first five days, the second-biggest opening of the fall, exceeding expectations. The film went on to gross $33,244,684 at the box office in the United States and Canada and an additional $10,952,000 overseas for a worldwide total of $44,196,684. It became United Artists' second highest-grossing film of 1988 following Rain Man.

=== Home media ===
Child's Play was originally released on VHS in North America by MGM/UA Home Video on April 25, 1989.

The film was first released on DVD by MGM Home Entertainment on September 28, 1999, which was available exclusively through Warner Home Video worldwide. The film was presented in an open-matte full screen presentation and included a theatrical trailer and a "Making Of" booklet. The Australian DVD release by MGM Home Entertainment featured the film in non-anamorphic widescreen transfer. The DVD was re-released in 2007 with a lenticular cover.

A 20th Anniversary DVD was released by MGM Home Entertainment and 20th Century Fox Home Entertainment on September 9, 2008. The film is presented in its original 1.85:1 Widescreen format (for the first time in the U.S. in 20 years) enhanced for 16x9 monitors and includes an English 5.1 surround track and English, French, and Spanish 2.0 stereo tracks. Special features include two audio commentaries with Alex Vincent, Catherine Hicks, Kevin Yagher, producer David Kirschner and screenwriter Don Mancini, a "Selected Scene Chucky Commentary", "Evil Comes in Small Packages" featurettes, a vintage featurette from 1988 titled "Introducing Chucky: The Making of Child's Play", and "Chucky: Building a Nightmare" featurette, theatrical trailer and a photo gallery. The film received a Blu-ray Disc release on September 15, 2009. The DVD does not feature any contributions from director Tom Holland, who claims he was not asked to contribute to it. In response, the website Icons of Fright contacted Holland and asked if he would be willing to record a commentary track that would be free for download on their website. He agreed, and the track is downloadable from here.

On October 8, 2013, the film was re-released again on DVD and Blu-ray in a boxset for the respective formats, containing all six Child's Play films.

On October 18, 2016, Scream Factory and MGM Home Entertainment re-released the film in a brand new Collector's Edition Blu-ray.

On October 3, 2017, Universal Pictures Home Entertainment re-released the film once again on DVD and Blu-ray in a boxset for the respective formats, containing all seven Child's Play films.

On August 16, 2022, the film was released in Ultra HD Blu-ray for the first time by Scream Factory, featuring newly-restored scans from the original camera negatives made for the first three Child's Play films in addition to Blu-rays containing new and legacy extras as well as the previously released remastered of the film from the 2016 Collector's Edition Blu-ray.

== Reception ==
Critics, who had previously been dismissive of the slasher genre, lauded the film for its distinctive villain, unsettling puppetry work, concise storytelling and death scenes. Review aggregator Rotten Tomatoes reports that 64% of 95 surveyed critics gave the film a positive review; the average rating is 6.3/10. The site's critics consensus reads, "Child's Play occasionally stumbles across its tonal tightrope of comedy and horror, but its genuinely creepy monster and some deft direction by Tom Holland makes this chiller stand out on the shelf." On Metacritic, which assigns a normalized rating to reviews, the film has a weighted average score of 58 out of 100 based on 18 critics, indicating "mixed or average" reviews. Audiences polled by CinemaScore gave the film an average grade of "B" on an A+ to F scale.

Roger Ebert gave the film 3 out of 4 stars, calling it a "cheerfully energetic horror film." Caryn James of The New York Times praised it as "a clever, playful thriller," adding, "It's the deft wit and swift editing that keeps us off guard, no matter how predictable the plot." Variety called the film a "near-miss", commending Tom Holland's "impressive technical skill" and the actors for keeping "straight faces during these outlandish proceedings," but finding that "the novelty is not buttressed by an interesting story to go along with the gimmick."

Kevin Thomas of the Los Angeles Times wrote, "Scary, yet darkly funny, this thriller of the supernatural from the director of the terrific 'Fright Night' moves with the speed of a bullet train and with style to burn." Dave Kehr of the Chicago Tribune gave the film 1 out of 4 stars and wrote that it "would probably be sickening if it weren't so relentlessly stupid." Richard Harrington of The Washington Post wrote that Holland "keeps things moving without rushing them. Unfortunately, 'Child's Play' gets a little ugly at the end, not only because the finale seems a rehash of virtually every shock movie of the last 10 years, but because it involves the very realistic terrorizing of a 6-year-old."

Philip Strick of The Monthly Film Bulletin found the plot contrived with "ludicrous supernatural gobbledygook" but thought that Holland handled the action sequences well. Author and film critic Leonard Maltin gave the film three out of a possible four stars, calling it "[a] scary and clever horror thriller", also praising the film's special effects.

=== Accolades ===
| Award | Category | Winner/Nominee | Result |
|---|---|---|---|
| Saturn Awards | Best Actress | Catherine Hicks | Won |
| Saturn Awards | Best Horror Film | Child's Play | Nominated |
| Saturn Awards | Best Performance by a Younger Actor | Alex Vincent | Nominated |
| Saturn Awards | Best Writing | Tom Holland, John Lafia, Don Mancini | Nominated |

== Controversies ==
During the initial release, a large crowd of protesters formed at the main entrance of MGM calling for a ban on the film because, they claimed, it would incite violence in children. Local news reporters from two TV stations were broadcasting live from the scene. The producer, David Kirschner, was watching the demonstration on TV and was disturbed. Jeffrey Hilton, who had been working in Kirschner's office at MGM, indicated that he could quell the disturbance in ten minutes. While Kirschner was watching from the safety of his office, Hilton spoke to the group's leader and shook his hand. The group instantly dispersed, much to the chagrin of the newscasters. Hilton did not reveal to Kirschner whether it had been a threat or simple diplomacy that saved the day. Tom Holland further recalled in 2023:

"I got boxes of letters from schoolchildren in Great Britain. There was an outcry against the movie where I was criticized for making children afraid of their playthings, especially the dolls, and how horrible I was."

Another controversy took place in March 1989, when the film was due to be released on VHS for the first time and a 30-second television advertisement was made to promote it. In the commercial, Chucky "comes to life and begins killing, pursuing an off-screen victim, committing aggressive acts and speaking in a threatening manner". ABC and CBS pulled the commercial from prime time because viewers (especially parents) began complaining about it being too frightening, thus it only aired at late hours. The advertisement also continued airing on NBC and MTM, according to Herb Fischer, the then senior vice president of domestic sales and marketing for MGM/UA.

Hilton's diplomacy notwithstanding, the film series was plagued with accusations of inciting violence in children. Child's Play 3 was cited as the "inspiration" for two murders, which took place in the United Kingdom in December 1992 and February 1993 respectively: the murder of Suzanne Capper and the murder of James Bulger. In the Suzanne Capper case, the 16-year-old was forced to listen to recordings of the gangleader repeating the catchphrase "I'm Chucky, wanna play?" Holland, in response to both murders, defended the film, stating that viewers of horror movies could only be influenced by their content if they were "unbalanced to begin with."

== Sequels and franchise ==
The film was followed by several sequels including Child's Play 2 (1990), Child's Play 3 (1991), Bride of Chucky (1998), Seed of Chucky (2004), Curse of Chucky (2013), Cult of Chucky (2017), and a television series titled Chucky (2021–2024).

=== Reboot ===
A reboot of the franchise was announced by Metro-Goldwyn-Mayer to be in development beginning in July 2018. Lars Klevberg served as director, from a script by Tyler Burton Smith. The film was co-produced by Seth Grahame-Smith, David Katzenberg and Aaron Schmidt. The adaptation featured a group of kids who come into contact with a modern-day hi-tech version of the Good Guys doll. The film starred Gabriel Bateman as Andy Barclay and Aubrey Plaza as his mother Karen while Mark Hamill provided the voice for Chucky. The film was released on June 21, 2019.

== See also ==
- List of American films of 1988
- "Living Doll", a 1963 episode of The Twilight Zone about a murderous talking doll
- Dolls, a 1987 horror film about killer dolls
- Trilogy of Terror, a 1975 anthology film featuring a story about a living Zuni fetish doll
- Vaa Arugil Vaa, a 1991 Tamil movie about a woman's soul inhabiting her favourite doll and exacting revenge on her killers
- Zapatlela, a 1993 Marathi language unofficial remake of Child's Play directed and written by Mahesh Kothare.
