= Tales from the Crypt (TV series) =

American horror anthology television series (1989–1996)

- Genre: Black comedy; Dark fantasy; Horror; Anthology
- Created by: William Gaines; Steven Dodd
- Based on: Tales from the Crypt by EC Comics
- Voices of: John Kassir
- Theme music composer: Danny Elfman
- Composers: Steve Bartek; Frank Becker; Bruce Broughton; Michel Colombier; Bill Conti; Ry Cooder; Cliff Eidelman; Christopher Franke; Jay Ferguson; Jan Hammer; James Horner; Vladimir Horunzhy; Michael Kamen; David Mansfield; David Newman; Nicholas Pike; J. Peter Robinson; Michel Rubini; Alan Silvestri; Jimmy Webb; Walter Werzowa
- Country of origin: United States
- Original languages: English; French; Spanish
- No. of seasons: 7
- No. of episodes: 93 (list of episodes)

Production
- Executive producers: Richard Donner; David Giler; Walter Hill; Joel Silver; Robert Zemeckis
- Running time: 22–39 minutes
- Production companies: Tales from the Crypt Holdings; Geffen Television

Original release
- Network: HBO
- Release: June 10, 1989 – July 19, 1996

Related
- Tales from the Cryptkeeper; Secrets of the Cryptkeeper's Haunted House

Tales from the Crypt, sometimes titled HBO's Tales from the Crypt, is an American horror anthology television series created by William Gaines and Steven Dodd that ran for seven seasons on the premium cable channel HBO, from June 10, 1989, to July 19, 1996, with a total of 93 episodes. The show's title is based on the 1950s EC Comics series of the same name, published by William Gaines and edited by Al Feldstein. Despite the show's title, episodes were not only adapted from stories from Tales from the Crypt, but also other EC Comic series including The Haunt of Fear, The Vault of Horror, Crime SuspenStories, Shock SuspenStories, and Two-Fisted Tales.

The series is hosted by the Cryptkeeper, a wisecracking corpse performed by several puppeteers and voiced by John Kassir. Filmmakers Richard Donner, David Giler, Walter Hill, Joel Silver, and Robert Zemeckis formed the show's team of executive producers.

Because it was aired on HBO, a premium cable television channel, Tales from the Crypt did not have to be censored by the standards and practices of most networks. As a result, HBO allowed the series to include content that had not appeared in most television series up to that time, such as graphic violence, strong language and explicit sex/nudity. Reruns of the series were edited for basic cable, broadcast syndication when the broadcast networks Fox and CBS re-aired episodes in the late 1990s. While the series began production in the United States, the final season was primarily filmed in the United Kingdom, resulting in episodes revolving around British characters.

== Format ==
Each episode begins with a tracking shot leading across the grounds of a decrepit mansion during a thunderstorm at night. Once inside the front entrance, the camera pans across the foyer and main stairway before moving into an adjoining room, where a secret door opens in a wall. The camera descends a winding flight of stairs and advances through another door into the artifact-filled basement, stopping on a coffin from which the Cryptkeeper, the show's host, emerges with a wild cackle. Green slime pours down over the screen as the main title appears. The Cryptkeeper is depicted as an animated corpse, rather than a living human as in the comics.

The wisecracking Cryptkeeper, performed by a team of puppeteers such as Van Snowden, Mike Elizalde, Frank Charles Lutkus, Patty Maloney, David Arthur Nelson, Anton Rupprecht, Shaun Smith, David Stinnent, Mike Trcic, and Brock Winkless, and voiced by John Kassir, then introduced the episode with intentionally stereotyped jokes and mostly puns, e.g., his frequent greeting to viewers: "Hello, Boils and Ghouls" or "Hello, Kiddies". Each episode was self-contained, and was bookended by an outro sequence, again involving the Cryptkeeper. Comic book cover art was created by Mike Vosburg and Shawn McManus.

== Spin-offs ==
The success of the series led Universal Pictures to make a three picture deal with the Crypt Partners to produce three Crypt-branded feature films.

=== Films ===
The first Crypt-branded feature was Tales from the Crypt Presents: Demon Knight (1995). Directed by Ernest Dickerson from a screenplay by Ethan Reiff, Cyrus Vorhis, and Mark Bishop, it became a commercial success. Three weeks before starting prep on an intended Demon Knight follow-up—a psychological thriller called Dead Easy—Universal changed its mind, canceled Dead Easy and had the creative team make Tales from the Crypt Presents: Bordello of Blood (1996) instead.

The film Ritual (2002) was not produced as a Tales from the Crypt film, but is considered to be a third entry in the Tales series.

=== Tales from the Cryptkeeper ===
In 1993, a Saturday morning cartoon called Tales from the Cryptkeeper was spun off from the HBO series. Produced by the Canada-based Nelvana for ABC in the United States and YTV in Canada, the violence of the prime-time series was substantially toned down and the gore was omitted. Nelvana employed a child psychologist to review the scripts to ensure the episodes would be suitable for young viewers. The Cryptkeeper puppet was considered as the host for the series, but it was ultimately decided that it might frighten youngsters, so instead an animated version was created. John Kassir reprised his role.

Kassir later stated "Nelvana created a kinder, gentler personality for the children's Cryptkeeper, and it feels a little uncharacteristic at times". In addition to the Cryptkeeper, EC Comics' mascots The Vaultkeeper and The Old Witch made frequent appearances, often fighting with the Cryptkeeper for control of the show's hosting duties. The series lasted three seasons on ABC with 39 episodes. The third season was on CBS in 1999, with 13 episodes, under the title New Tales from the Cryptkeeper.

=== Secrets of the Cryptkeeper's Haunted House ===
A kids' game show called Secrets of the Cryptkeeper's Haunted House was featured on CBS from 1996 to 1997. The Cryptkeeper, again voiced by John Kassir, was the announcer of the show. He would often break into the action with wisecracks, and contestants competed in physical challenges on a variety of elaborate haunted house sets at Universal Studios Florida. In addition to The Cryptkeeper, the series showed off an original character named Digger the Skeleton, voiced by Danny Mann.

=== Radio series ===
In 2000, several Tales from the Crypt "radio shows" were recorded for Seeing Ear Theatre, an online subsidiary of The Sci-Fi Channel, and were offered free as streaming RealAudio files on their website, as well as for sale on Audible.com. Although 13 episodes were planned, with forthcoming episodes listed as "TBA", only eight stories were recorded. Seven of the eight shows were released on CD in 2002 by Highbridge Audio. "This Trick'll Kill You" was omitted from the CD set.

=== Two-Fisted Tales ===
In 1991, the Fox television network aired a pilot for Two-Fisted Tales, a spin-off based on the 1950s EC action comics. When Fox passed on the pilot, Cryptkeeper segments were put down onto the three stories, "Yellow", "Showdown", and "King of the Road", and HBO ran them as Tales from the Crypt episodes.

=== Perversions of Science ===
After the original series ended, a spin-off called Perversions of Science premiered in June 1997 on HBO, this time being based more on sci-fi instead of horror. The series was unsuccessful and lasted for a short run, ending only a month after it had begun airing. This iteration of the franchise featured a stylized female robot host in place of The Cryptkeeper.

=== 2026 AMC FearFest ===
To celebrate the 30th anniversary of AMC's annual "FearFest" horror programming event in 2026, the network is bringing back the Crypt Keeper to serve as the official host for the event. The puppet was freshly redesigned for modern audiences by special makeup effects creator Greg Nicotero; original voice actor John Kassir will return to provide the Crypt Keeper's voice.

== Notable guest stars ==
A variety of notable guests have starred in episodes of Tales from the Crypt. These include Academy Awards-winning actors, A-list celebrities and highly recognizable character actors.

Some of the most famous people to have starred in episodes are listed below:

- Adam West
- Alan Rachins
- Alan Ruck
- Amanda Plummer
- Andrew McCarthy
- Anna Friel
- Anthony Andrews
- Anthony Michael Hall
- Arnold Schwarzenegger
- Austin Pendleton
- Beau Bridges
- Ben Stein
- Benicio del Toro
- Bess Armstrong
- Beverly D'Angelo
- Bill Paxton
- Billy Zane
- Blythe Danner
- Bob Hoskins
- Bobcat Goldthwait
- Brad Dourif
- Brad Garrett
- Brad Pitt
- Brian Kerwin
- Brion James
- Brooke Shields
- Bruce Boxleitner
- Bruce Davison
- Bruce McGill
- Bruce Payne
- Bruno Kirby
- Burt Young
- Carol Kane
- Catherine O'Hara
- Cathy Moriarty
- Charles Martin Smith
- Cheech Marin
- Chelsea Field
- Christopher Reeve
- Ciaran Hinds
- Clancy Brown
- Clarence Williams III
- Cleavon Little
- Colin Salmon
- Colleen Camp
- Corey Feldman
- Costas Mandylor
- Cynthia Gibb
- D. B. Sweeney
- Dan Aykroyd
- Daniel Craig
- David Hemmings
- David Morse
- David Paymer
- David Warner
- Demi Moore
- Dennis Farina
- Don Rickles
- Donald O'Connor
- Dylan McDermott
- Ed Begley Jr.
- Eddie Izzard
- Elizabeth McGovern
- Ernie Hudson
- Esai Morales
- Ewan McGregor
- Frances Bay
- Frances Sternhagen
- Francesca Annis
- George Wendt
- Grace Zabriskie
- Hank Azaria
- Harry Anderson
- Hector Elizondo
- Iggy Pop
- Imelda Staunton
- Isaac Hayes
- Isabella Rossellini
- Jada Pinkett Smith
- Jake Busey
- James Remar
- James Tolkan
- Jane Horrocks
- Janet Hubert
- Jason London
- Jason Marsden
- Jeffrey Jones
- Jeffrey Tambor
- Jennifer Rubin
- Jessica Harper
- Joan Chen
- Joan Severance
- Joe Pantoliano
- Joe Pesci
- John Astin
- John Glover
- John Lithgow
- John Rhys-Davies
- John Savage
- John Shea
- John Stamos
- Jon Lovitz
- Jonathan Banks
- Judd Nelson
- Katey Sagal
- Kathleen Freeman
- Kathy Ireland
- Ke Huy Quan
- Kelly Preston
- Kevin Dillon
- Kevin McCarthy
- Kim Delaney
- Kimberly Williams
- Kirk Douglas
- Kyle MacLachlan
- Kyle Secor
- Lainie Kazan
- Lance Henriksen
- Larry Drake
- Lea Thompson
- Lewis Arquette
- Lou Diamond Phillips
- Louise Fletcher
- Lysette Anthony
- M. Emmet Walsh
- Madge Sinclair
- Malcolm McDowell
- Marg Helgenberger
- Margot Kidder
- Mariel Hemingway
- Mark Dacascos
- Mark Rolston
- Martin Kove
- Martin Sheen
- Mary Ellen Trainor
- Maryam d'Abo
- Meat Loaf
- Meredith Salenger
- Michael Ironside
- Michael J. Fox
- Michael J. Pollard
- Michael Lerner
- Miguel Ferrer
- Mimi Rogers
- Moses Gunn
- Natasha Richardson
- Patricia Arquette
- Patricia Clarkson
- Patsy Kensit
- Paul Dooley
- Perry King
- Peter MacNicol
- Priscilla Presley
- R. Lee Ermey
- Rance Howard
- Raymond J. Barry
- Reginald VelJohnson
- Richard Lewis
- Richard Schiff
- Richard Thomas
- Rick Rossovich
- Rita Rudner
- Rita Wilson
- Robert Patrick
- Robert Picardo
- Robert Wuhl
- Roger Daltrey
- Sam Kinison
- Sam Waterston
- Sherilyn Fenn
- Simon Baker
- Slash
- Sônia Braga
- Steve Buscemi
- Steve Coogan
- Steven Weber
- Sugar Ray Leonard
- Susan Tyrrell
- Tate Donovan
- Teri Garr
- Teri Hatcher
- Teri Polo
- Terry O'Quinn
- Tia Carrere
- Tim Curry
- Tim Roth
- Timothy Dalton
- Timothy Stack
- Tom Hanks
- Tony Goldwyn
- Traci Lords
- Travis Tritt
- Treat Williams
- Vanity
- Vincent Schiavelli
- Vincent Spano
- Wayne Newton
- Wendie Malick
- Whoopi Goldberg
- Wil Wheaton
- William Atherton
- William Hickey
- William Sadler
- Yvonne De Carlo
- Zach Galligan
- Zelda Rubinstein

== Albums ==
=== Soundtrack ===
In 1991, Big Screen Records released a soundtrack album featuring assorted music from the series. The album includes the theme music, suites from 11 episodes and an original song titled "Crypt Jam" performed by The Cryptkeeper, John Kassir. A music video for "Crypt Jam" was filmed and is available as an extra on the Region 1 Season 3 DVD.

Track	Title	Composer	Length
01	Tales from the Crypt (Main Title)	Danny Elfman	2:27
02	Three's a Crowd	Jan Hammer	3:50
03	Cutting Cards	James Horner	3:45
04	Loved to Death	Jimmy Webb	3:19
05	Dead Wait	David Mansfield	4:04
06	Undertaking Palor	Nicholas Pike	3:10
07	Carrion Death	Bruce Broughton	3:32
08	Ventriloquist's Dummy	Miles Goodman	3:32
09	The Thing from the Grave	David Newman	2:53
10	The Man Who Was Death	Ry Cooder	4:22
11	Reluctant Vampire	Cliff Eidelman	3:50
12	Deadline	Steve Bartek	3:32
13	The Crypt Jam	Chuckii Booker	4:30

=== Have Yourself a Scary Little Christmas ===
In 1994, a Christmas album, Have Yourself a Scary Little Christmas, was released by The Right Stuff, a subsidiary of Capitol Records. Most of the songs are spoofs of holiday standards performed by The Cryptkeeper, such as "Juggle Bills" (Jingle Bells), "We Wish You'd Bury the Missus" (We Wish You a Merry Christmas) and "Deck the Halls with Parts of Charlie" (Deck the Halls), with narration and a few original songs mixed in. The CD booklet includes a black and white reprint of the comic "And All Through the House".

Track	Title	Length
01	Intro to Album	0:51
02	Deck the Halls with Parts of Charlie	1:55
03	Juggle Bills	3:17
04	We Wish You'd Bury the Missus	2:20
05	Moe Teitlebaum	2:32
06	A Christmas Card for the Cryptkeeper	0:51
07	Christmas Rap	3:22
08	Intro to Cryptkeeper's Family Christmas	0:32
09	Cryptkeeper's Family Christmas	2:03
10	'Twas the Fright Before Christmas	3:55
11	Twelve Days of Cryptmas	3:42
12	Intro to Revenge of the Cryptkeeper	0:24
13	Revenge of the Cryptkeeper	2:18
14	Have Yourself a Scary Little Christmas	2:21
15	Should Old Cadavers Be Forgot	3:38

=== Monsters of Metal ===
In 2000, Capitol Records released another album titled Tales from the Crypt: Monsters of Metal. This album is a compilation of horror-themed songs from popular heavy metal bands with wraparound narration by the Cryptkeeper (John Kassir).

Track	Title	Artist	Length
01	The Cryptkeeper Intro #1	John Kassir	0:30
02	Heaven and Hell	Black Sabbath	6:54
03	Creepy Feelings	Armored Saint	5:21
04	Five Magics	Megadeth	5:41
05	The Cryptkeeper Intro #2	John Kassir	0:14
06	Cemetery Gates (Demon Knight)	Pantera	5:47
07	Eyes of a Stranger	Queensrÿche	4:40
08	Hallucinating	Apartment 26	3:40
09	The Cryptkeeper Intro #3	John Kassir	0:35
10	Dead Inside	Arch Enemy	4:11
11	Beyond the Realms of Death	Judas Priest	6:53
12	Snap Your Fingers, Snap Your Neck	Prong	4:12
13	The Cryptkeeper Intro #4	John Kassir	0:16
14	Don't Talk to Strangers	Dio	4:52
15	Bordello of Blood	Anthrax	4:12
16	The Bell Witch	Mercyful Fate	4:34
17	The Cryptkeeper Intro #5	John Kassir	0:21
18	Wolverine Blues	Entombed	2:10
19	Hollow Ground	The Haunted	4:10
20	Beyond the Black	Metal Church	6:22
21	The Cryptkeeper Ending	John Kassir	0:46

== Home media ==
Warner Home Video has released all seven seasons on DVD Region 1. The DVDs for the first three seasons feature all-new Cryptkeeper introductions and segments. No new segments were filmed for seasons 4–7. In June 2017, all seven seasons were reissued in a box set entitled Tales from the Crypt: The Complete Series. A Region 2 version of the whole series was released by '84 Entertainment in June 2010.

Until mid-2020, the series was available through the streaming platform Vudu.

Season	Episodes	Discs	Release date	Extras
1	6	2	July 12, 2005	All New Introduction by the Cryptkeeper; Tales from the Crypt: From Comic Books to Television; Cryptkeeper's History of Season One
2	18	3	October 25, 2005	Behind-the-Screams Shockumentary Feature; Fright and Sound: Bringing the Crypt Experience to Radio
3	14	3	March 21, 2006	A Tall Tales Panel; A Tales from the Crypt Reunion: A Panel Discussion; Crypt Jam Music Video
4	14	3	July 25, 2006	Commentary on 'What's Cookin; Stars of Season 4 Montage Hosted by the Cryptkeeper
5	13	3	October 31, 2006	Death of Some Salesmen: Virtual Comic Book
6	15	3	July 24, 2007	Whirlpool: Virtual Comic Book
7	13	3	October 23, 2007	Fatal Caper: Virtual Comic Book
Complete series box set	93	20	June 6, 2017	

== Reruns ==
Reruns aired on Fox from 1994 to 1995 under the name Primetime Tales from the Crypt; episodes also aired in 1994 in a late-night time slot. It aired late night on CBS in 1997–1998. It also aired on other channels, such as Syfy, Chiller, and Fearnet.

In the United Kingdom, the series aired Fridays on ITV. Sky1 Satellite and cable channel Horror Channel, then Zone Horror, aired the series in both late night and daytime slots. The daytime versions were billed as "cut". However, they remained uncut.

Tales from the Crypt is not available on HBO's streaming service HBO Max reportedly due to licensing issues. It was also unavailable on HBO Go and HBO Now for the same reason. In April 2026, it was announced that Shudder had acquired the rights to all seven seasons, with each season being added weekly from May 1, 2026 through June 12, 2026, and all episodes being in their uncut form.

On July 22, 2026, it was added to Tubi as part of a wider distribution deal.

== Awards ==
Tales from the Crypt won the following awards:

- 1991 Motion Picture Sound Editors' Golden Reel Award for Best Sound Editing – Television Half-Hour – ADR
- 1992 Motion Picture Sound Editors' Golden Reel Award for Best Sound Editing – Television Episodic – Effects and Foley
- 1993 Motion Picture Sound Editors' Golden Reel Award for Best Sound Editing – Television Episodic – Effects and Foley
- 1993 CableACE Award for Best Actress in a Dramatic Series (Cathy Moriarty in the episode "Séance")
- 1994 American Cinema Editors' Eddie Award for Best Edited Half Hour Series for Television (for the episode "People Who Live in Brass Hearses")

=== Nominations ===
- 1990 Emmy Award for Outstanding Guest Actor in a Drama Series (William Hickey in the episode "The Switch")
- 1991 Young Artist Award for Best Young Actor in a Cable Special (Mike Simmrin in the episode "The Secret")
- 1992 Casting Society of America's Artios Award for Best Casting for TV, Dramatic Episodic
- 1994 Emmy Awards for Outstanding Individual Achievement in Makeup for a Series and Outstanding Lead Actor in a Drama Series (Kirk Douglas)
- 1994 Emmy Awards for Outstanding Guest Actor in a Drama Series (Tim Curry in the episode "Death Of Some Salesman"), Outstanding Individual Achievement in Costume Design for a Series and Outstanding Individual Achievement in Makeup for a Series
- 1994 Young Artist Award for Best Youth Actor Guest Starring in a Television Show (Raushan Hammond in the episode "People Who Live in Brass Hearses")
- 1995 Emmy Award for Outstanding Individual Achievement in Costume Design for a Series
- 1996 American Society of Cinematographers Award for Outstanding Achievement in Cinematography in Regular Series (for the episode "You Murderer")

== Revival attempts ==
In July 2011, it was announced that Gilbert Adler, who produced the original series, was working with Andrew Cosby to develop a new Tales from the Crypt series. It was said to be a continuous story, rather than an anthology, and would omit The Cryptkeeper. The series was unsuccessfully shopped to several major networks.

In January 2016, Entertainment Weekly reported that M. Night Shyamalan would helm a series reboot as part of TNT's new two-hour horror block. The network ordered a 10-episode season that was slated for fall 2017. The series was to keep the episodic anthology format, but without The Cryptkeeper. In June 2017, it was announced that TNT would not move forward with the series due to legal issues concerning the rights for the characters from Tales from the Crypt Holdings.
