= Bordello of Blood =

1996 film by Gilbert Adler

- Theatrical release poster
- Directed by: Gilbert Adler
- Screenplay by: A.L. Katz; Gilbert Adler
- Story by: Bob Gale; Robert Zemeckis
- Based on: Tales from the Crypt by EC Comics
- Produced by: Gilbert Adler
- Starring: Dennis Miller; Erika Eleniak; Angie Everhart; Chris Sarandon; Corey Feldman
- Cinematography: Tom Priestley
- Edited by: Stephen Lovejoy
- Music by: Chris Boardman
- Production company: Crypt Keeper Pictures
- Distributed by: Universal Pictures
- Release date: August 16, 1996
- Running time: 87 minutes
- Country: United States
- Language: English
- Budget: $2.5 million
- Box office: $5.6 million

Tales from the Crypt Presents: Bordello of Blood is a 1996 American horror comedy film directed by Gilbert Adler from a screenplay by Adler and A.L. Katz, and a story by Bob Gale and Robert Zemeckis. Dennis Miller stars as Rafe Guttman, a private investigator hired by Katherine Verdoux (Erika Eleniak) to investigate the disappearance of her brother Caleb (Corey Feldman) which leads him to a bordello run by Lilith (Angie Everhart).

The film was developed by Gale and Zemeckis in the 1970s after their college graduation. The duo conceived the original script as an exploitation film designed to break the duo into the film industry, but it went unproduced. The concept was subsequently revisited to serve as the second film in a proposed Tales from the Crypt film trilogy greenlit by Universal Pictures following the success of the first film spinoff of the HBO series, Demon Knight (1995). Miller and Everhart were suggested for the cast by executive producer Joel Silver, though Adler and Katz wanted other actors to play the parts.

Filming took place in Vancouver, British Columbia, Canada, where the production was troubled by limited night time and continuity issues due to Miller's constant improvisation and refusal to show up on set. Released in North America on August 16, 1996, Bordello of Blood was produced for $2.5 million, and it grossed $5.6 million. The film received generally negative reviews from critics and fans of the series. According to Everhart, it has become a cult film.

== Plot ==
=== Cold opening ===
A group of treasure hunters led by Vincent Prather explore a forest, encountering a cave containing the coffin of Lilith, the mother of all vampires. Vincent takes out a box containing the four sections of her heart and inserts it in her body, reviving her. Lilith awakens and kills the other treasure hunters, but Vincent subdues her with the key from Demon Knight.

=== Crypt Keeper's Prologue ===
The Crypt Keeper is having lunch with the Mummy, who is boring him about film industry life. The Mummy challenges the Crypt Keeper to a contest of rock, paper, scissors which the Mummy wins, and he slices off the Keeper's hand with a meat cleaver similar to what happened in "The Assassin" episode of the TV series. The Crypt Keeper laughs (as it didn't hurt him at all) and the Mummy gets ready for the next round. The Crypt Keeper addresses the audience, and the movie continues.

=== Story ===
After fighting with his sister Katherine, Caleb Verdoux goes to a dive bar, where an odd man named Jenkins tells him of a brothel hidden in a funeral home. Caleb and his friend Reggie visit the address, where they are forced at gunpoint by mortician McCutcheon to climb into a coffin and sent through a furnace with a secret trap door leading to said brothel, unaware the prostitutes are all vampires led by Lilith. A prostitute named Tallulah seduces Reggie, whom Lilith kills before vampirizing Caleb.

When the police fail to find Caleb, Katherine reluctantly hires cynical and sarcastic private investigator Rafe Guttman, who tracks Caleb's trail to the bar, where Caleb's friends direct him to the funeral home. After a tip from Jenkins, Rafe revisits the funeral home that night. Initially, it appears as just a funeral home. Rafe overhears Lilith interview a woman, Tamara, followed by Tamara's scream and a body hitting the floor. He finds Caleb's nose ring and escapes. The next day he takes it to Katherine and tells her he's going to stake out the funeral home that evening. Unbeknownst to Rafe, the funeral home conceals a corrupt organization run by Reverend J.C. Current.

Rafe is admitted into the brothel and approached by the now-vampirized Tamara, whom he tricks into letting him strap her to a torture rack so he can investigate further, finding Jenkins decapitated in a coffin. While fleeing, Rafe drops his wallet, allowing Lilith to find his address. Having tasted Rafe's blood, Lilith takes an interest and tries to seduce him. When Katherine arrives, Rafe follows and describes the brothel's activity to her. They alert the police, who dismiss Rafe as a fraud due to lack of evidence. Meanwhile, Vincent destroys the key, freeing Lilith.

As Katherine reviews footage where she confronted Lilith, she notices Lilith is not in the shot. Realizing that Rafe might be right, she calls him over. Caleb calls for help, asking them to meet him at the power plant. Upon arrival, they discover the vampirized Caleb and flee, but Rafe falls out a window, landing on the police chief's car. The vampires catch Katherine and return her to the brothel.

Awakening in a hospital, Rafe is nearly killed by Tamara, who is posing as a nurse, but exposes her to sunlight, killing her. Katherine awakens and begs Caleb to free her, who refuses, too ingrained as Lilith's servant and having fully embraced his newfound vampiric lifestyle. Lilith prepares to feed on Katherine while Caleb watches. Rafe loads up on Super Soakers filled with holy water and raids the brothel, killing Vincent and McCutcheon. He meets up with Current, who, having realized his error and attempting to rectify it, has brought stakes and mallets to kill the vampires. Current tells Rafe that Lilith's heart must be removed from her body and quartered, as before she was found. Rafe gives him a spare water gun and the two enter the brothel and spray the vampires, including Caleb and Tallulah, who burn and explode.

They find Lilith, who mortally wounds Current and flees after Rafe attacks her with an axe. Rafe finds Katherine, and they head to Current's church to reveal the existence of vampires with its media equipment. Lilith returns, handcuffs Rafe to a railing, and attacks Katherine. Rafe uses a nearby laser to hit Lilith in the heart, quartering it. However, as the pieces remain in her body, Lilith remains alive. As Lilith devolves into her hideous true form and attacks Rafe, Katherine grabs a candle stand and stabs out Lilith's heart. After Lilith's body burns and collapses to the ground, the two consecrate her remains with the help of Rabbi Goldman and lock away the box with the heart pieces.

Later, in his car, Rafe fondles Katherine, which she seems oddly more accepting of now, having been disgusted by him earlier. He notices the scent she's wearing. She remarks, "It's not perfume. It's sunblock." When he pulls back her skirt, he notices bite-marks on her thigh, indicating that Katherine had been vampirized by Lilith while hostage. She then flashes her fangs and bites Rafe in the neck, overpowering him.

=== Epilogue ===
The Crypt Keeper jokes that if Rafe and Katherine got married, she'd know "what's eating him... She is!". He has also apparently bested the Mummy at the game and reduced him to nothing but a head. The Crypt Keeper tells him to "quit while he's 'a head'" before laughing.

== Cast ==
Main cast

- Dennis Miller as Rafe Guttman
- Erika Eleniak as Katherine Verdoux
- Angie Everhart as Lilith
- Chris Sarandon as Reverend J.C. Current
- Corey Feldman as Caleb Verdoux
- Aubrey Morris as McCutcheon
- Phil Fondacaro as Vincent Prather
- Juliet Reagh as Tallulah
- Kiara Hunter as Tamara
- Eli Gabay as Miguel
- Matt Hill as Reggie
- Eric Keenleyside as Sheriff Noonan
- Robert Munic as Zeke
- Gary Starr as Jeb
- Dorian Joe Clark as Jonas
- Kim Kondrashoff as Jenkins
- Robert Rozen as Rabbi Goldman

Cameos

- John Kassir as the voice of the Crypt Keeper
  - Brock Winkless as the puppeteer of the Crypt Keeper
- William Sadler as Mummy
- Whoopi Goldberg as Hospital Patient (uncredited)

== Development ==
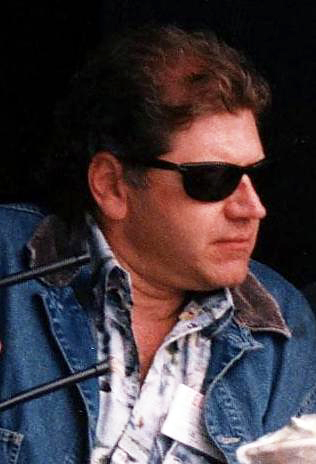
Robert Zemeckis cowrote the story of Bordello of Blood with Bob Gale after graduating from college in 1973.

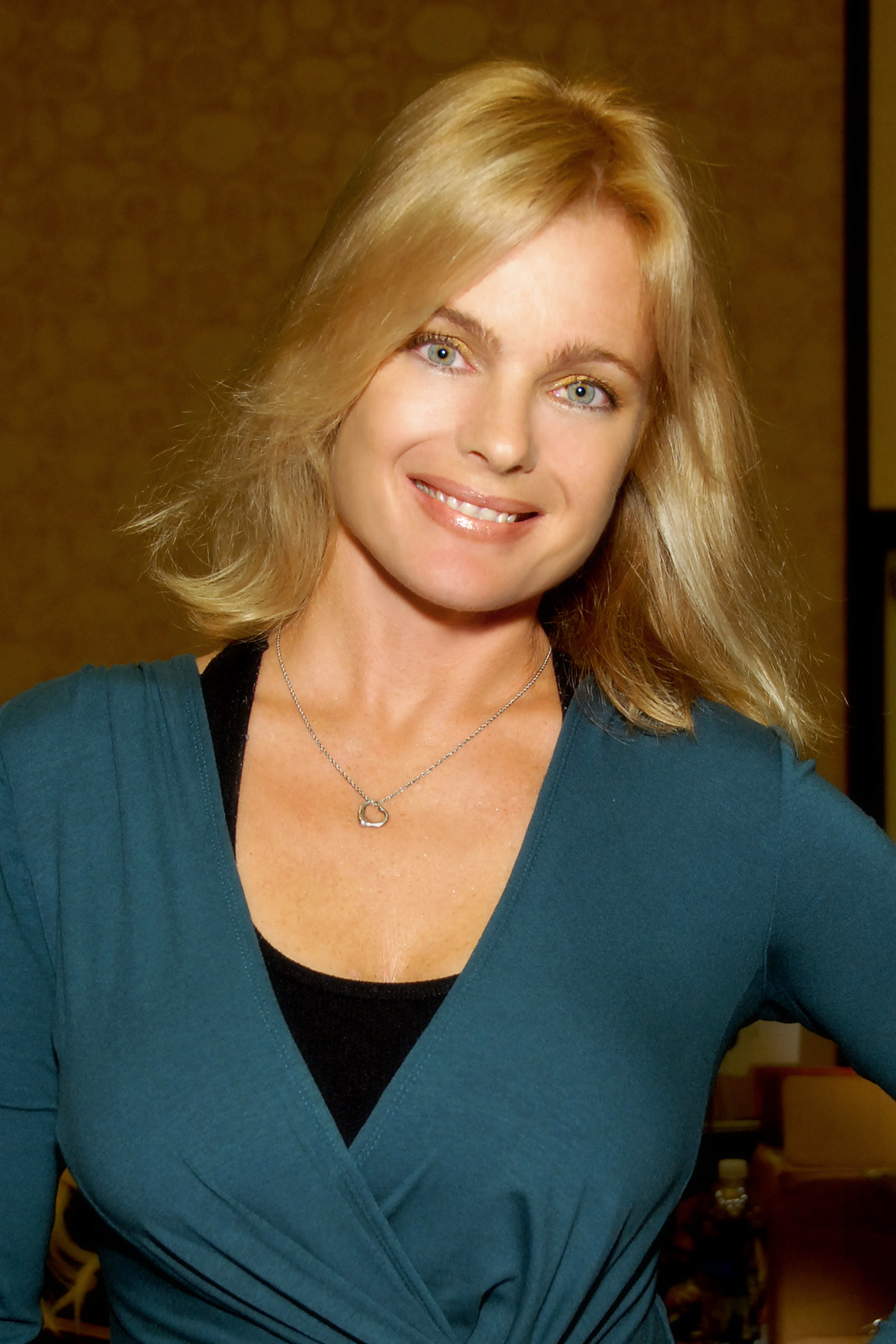
Erika Eleniak's character, Katherine, was originally scripted as being a former pornographic film star.

After graduating from USC in 1973, Bob Gale and Robert Zemeckis wrote an early draft of Bordello of Blood, wanting to break into the film industry by making an exploitation film about "a whorehouse full of vampires". They pitched Bordello of Blood to producer John Milius in the 1970s, but ultimately was not produced at that time, and the three wound up making 1941 instead, but Milius described the scripts for Bordello and another proposed film from the duo entitled Tank as being "pretty darn good".

Following the commercial success of the Tales from the Crypt film Demon Knight (1995), Universal Pictures greenlit two more Tales films, planning to make a film trilogy. The original proposed second film was Dead Easy (a.k.a. Fat Tuesday), a zombie film set in New Orleans, which was shut down during pre-production by Universal. The producers also considered Quentin Tarantino's screenplay From Dusk till Dawn as a possible Tales from the Crypt film, as well as Peter Jackson's The Frighteners. During this development process, Robert Zemeckis was offered a contract with DreamWorks, and considered leaving Universal. To appease him into staying with the studio, it was agreed that a revised Bordello of Blood be produced as the second Tales film.

== Production ==
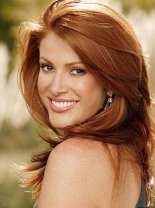
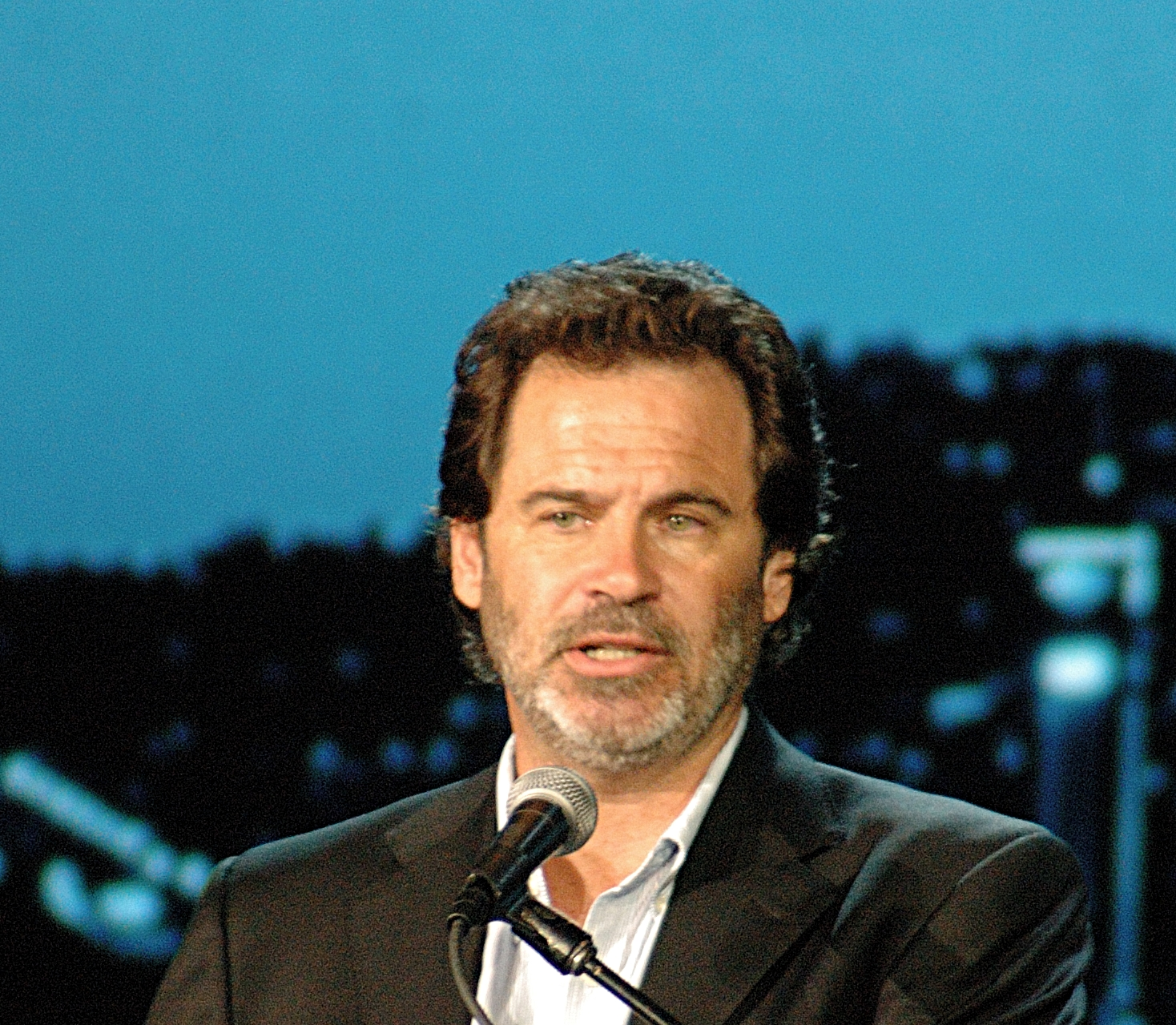
Angie Everhart and Dennis Miller were suggested for the film by executive producer Joel Silver.

The production budget was $2.5 million. Gilbert Adler was hired to direct, having previously been a showrunner for Tales from the Crypt. Adler and A.L. Katz rewrote Gale and Zemeckis' script to make the film more modern. Corey Feldman, who was friends with executive producer Richard Donner and had previously acted in an episode of Tales, was cast in the film as Caleb. Adler and Katz wanted Daniel Baldwin to play Rafe Guttman, Bridgette Wilson to play Katherine and Robin Givens to play Lilith. Executive producer Joel Silver, however, wanted Dennis Miller to play Rafe, and Angie Everhart to play Lilith. Silver had recently produced a movie with a supermodel in a leading role, and while Everhart, whose only previous performance was a minor role in Last Action Hero, was not a trained actress, Silver thought "supermodel actresses" was "the next big thing". Everhart was introduced to Silver by Sylvester Stallone, who suggested her for the part of Lilith. Miller, who did not want to make the film, said he would play the lead for $1 million, but Universal refused to put up this salary for Miller, so Silver cut $750,000 from the special effects budget to hire Miller.

The movie was filmed in Vancouver because of Silver's past union disputes, and Katz described the Canadian production crew as being inexperienced. In addition, Vancouver's limited night hours in July and August caused problems trying to film night scenes. Miller disliked his character's scripted dialogue and once he started filming, he proceeded to improvise nearly all of his dialogue. The Bordello of Blood shoot was rescheduled to work around the shooting of Dennis Miller Live, and the Canadian crew became angry at Miller because the filming schedule prevented their seeing their families on the weekends. On some days, Miller's assistant told the production that he was too tired to show up, which meant that some of Miller's scenes had to be shot without him with the script supervisor standing in for Miller. The cast became angry at Miller, and the script supervisor sometimes did not remember all of Miller's improvised dialogue, which led to continuity problems.

According to Katz, after filming began, Erika Eleniak's manager told the production that she would not travel to the set unless significant portions of the script that she found unacceptable were rewritten. Eleniak had left Baywatch because she wanted to be taken seriously as an actress, and allegedly did not want to play the character of Katherine as previously written. Katz claimed Katherine was scripted as being a stripper, and Adler and Katz frantically rewrote the script and changed these aspects of the character so she would travel to the set. However, Eleniak disputes this claim, saying that her argument with the producers was due to Joel Silver wanting to add a "sexy" scene between her and Everhart which had not been in the script, and that changes had been made to the script based on Eleniak's casting to make her character "sexier". Eleniak expressed disappointment that due to rewrites, the backstory of Katherine having a past as a 300lb ex-porn star named Chubbie O'Toole was removed from the film. Eleniak recalled later that she wore special makeup effects that were created for a brief scene in which Katherine discovers a Chubbie O'Toole poster in Rafe's office.

== Soundtrack ==
Bordello of Blood

Soundtrack album
- Released: August 7, 1996
- Genres: heavy metal; glam
- Label: Universal

Tales from the Crypt chronology
Demon Knight (1995)	Bordello of Blood (1996)	Monsters of Metal (2000)

Professional ratings
Review scores
Source	Rating
Allmusic	2/5 stars

The film's soundtrack album was released on August 7, 1996. It focused predominately on heavy metal and glam music by artists such as Anthrax, Red Kross, Kerbdog, Sweet, Scorpions and Cinderella. It received a score of two out of five stars from Allmusic.

No.	Title	Artist	Length
1.	"Bordello of Blood"	Anthrax	4:12
2.	"This Is Not a Love Song"	Kerbdog	2:25
3.	"All Right Now"	Free	5:32
4.	"Jailbreak"	Thin Lizzy	3:59
5.	"Ballroom Blitz"	Sweet	4:02
6.	"Deuce"	Redd Kross	3:12
7.	"Still Loving You"	Scorpions	6:26
8.	"30 Days in the Hole"	Humble Pie	3:56
9.	"Love's Got Me Doin' Time"	Cinderella	5:16
10.	"From the Underworld"	The Herd featuring Peter Frampton	3:16
Total length:			42:13

== Release ==
In a televised appearance prior to the film's release, Dennis Miller told viewers not to see Bordello of Blood. Bordello of Blood grossed $5.6 million. Upon release, the film was generally disliked by fans of the TV series, but later it developed a fanbase and is now considered a cult film. While the third film in the Tales from the Crypt film trilogy was never produced, Ritual (2002) is considered an unofficial entry in the Tales series.

In October 2015, Shout! Factory subsidiary Scream Factory released a special edition of the film on Blu-ray and DVD. On July 16, 2016, the film was given a special 20th anniversary screening at the Canadian Rio Theatre in Vancouver, BC, attended by Adler and special effects artist Todd Masters. John Kassir also participated via Skype.

=== Critical reception ===
Upon release, the film was poorly received by critics. Leonard Maltin gave the film two stars, calling it a "fitfully amusing juvenile horror comedy". Chicago Tribune reviewer Mark Caro wrote: "The Crypt tradition is ghoulish irreverence, but here it seems merely a hip excuse to stoop low". The Deseret News wrote: "For a horror-comedy film to work, it's got to be both funny and scary. Tales From the Crypt Presents Bordello of Blood is neither. Instead, it's only a bath of blood and bare skin, with some lame wisecracks thrown in for bad measure". Writing for The Washington Post, Richard Harrington said: "Triple the length of its cable television inspiration, Tales From the Crypt Presents Bordello of Blood is triple the gore, triple the naked women, but not, alas, triple the fun". Variety panned the film, writing, "another cheesy goulash of smart-alecky humor and full-bore gore, spiced with more shots of topless lovelies than you'd find in a '60s sexploitation flick. Adolescent boys might groove to the mix, but most other ticketbuyers will avoid this tawdry opus like the plague". TV Guide gave the film 1 out of 5 stars: "Miller is the best thing about the film, but a little of him goes a long way, and he's on screen a lot. [...] This is a travesty, and if Tales From the Crypt publisher Bill Gaines isn't spinning in his grave, it can only be because someone's already put a stake through his heart". Peter Stack of the San Francisco Chronicle wrote: "Bordello of Blood ... easily could have been called 'Bore-dello of Blood'. This gory vampire spoof is remarkably free of jolts, hardly registering as a fright film, with a series of weak special effects involving many globs of guts".

The New York Times critic Lawrence Gelder wrote: "Vampires aren't the only things in Bordello of Blood that can't stand up to daylight. Neither can the plot". Austin Chronicle critic Marc Savlov gave the film 1 out of 5 stars, calling it "The Dennis Miller Show... with nekkid vampire-vixens". Exclaim! writer Robert Bell gave the film 4 out of 10: "Tales from the Crypt was known for its twist endings, morality parables and askew sensibility; this feature shared none of those traits, and wouldn't be recognizable as a part of the series without the presence of the Cryptkeeper bookending the film". Dread Central gave the film a score of 2 out of 5: "If you told me the screenwriters dug through Miller's trash and inserted his discarded one-liners into the script, I would have no problem believing it. Not a single one of his lines works, and every time he opens his mouth it only further reinforces the fact he was so very, very wrong for this role". Allmovie also gave the film a score of two stars out of five: "Even with its obligatory Crypt Keeper bookends, the 87-minute Bordello of Blood seems as inflated as the many surgically enhanced breasts on display".

However, not all reviews were negative. The Los Angeles Times writer Jack Matthews gave the film a favorable review, calling it a "bloody good vehicle for Dennis Miller", writing: "What it lacks in irony and suspense, Gilbert Adler's Tales From the Crypt Presents Bordello of Blood makes up for in whimsy and cheeky self-assurance. [...] This is the version of Dracula that Bram Stoker would have written with the collaboration of Mel Brooks and the Marquis de Sade over drinks at Hooters". Arrow in the Head also reviewed the film favorably, giving it a score of 6 out of 10, writing that "this second entry in the Tales From The Crypt big screen series doesn't fully measure up to its predecessor, but sill manages to deliver a mindless fun ride". ComingSoon.net wrote that "Bordello is in many ways a superior Tales from the Crypt entry. Adler had previously directed episodes of the show and the film feels like an amplified episode, brightly lit, garish and tricked out with even more sleaze, sex, blood and general luridness". The Digital Bits wrote: "Despite itself, Bordello of Blood is a fun movie. It's not the best in the Tales from the Crypt series, but it's miles above [Ritual]. [...] Sure there are plenty of eye-rolling moments, [...] but it's worth a couple of watches... especially to see William Sadler as a mummy".

The film holds a 14% approval rating on Rotten Tomatoes based on 35 reviews, and the average rating is 3.7/10. The consensus states: "Bordello of Blood is not as scary or funny as it thinks it is (or should've been), and all of Dennis Miller's lines sound like castoffs from his stand-up material".

In a 2015 interview, Bob Gale, who had co-written the original screenplay with Robert Zemeckis, had said this about the film: "Bordello of Blood was the first thing that Bob and I ever collaborated on, even before we got out of film school. The movie that was made is so different than the movie that we conceived of, I'll tell you flat out I've never even seen the final version of it because the early cut of it I saw, I was so appalled by it that I just said, "Okay, I'll just leave that one to everybody else".

== See also ==
- Vampire film
