= Meet the Applegates =

1990 film by Michael Lehmann

- Home media release poster
- Directed by: Michael Lehmann
- Written by: Michael Lehmann; Redbeard Simmons
- Produced by: Denise Di Novi
- Starring: Ed Begley Jr.; Stockard Channing; Dabney Coleman
- Cinematography: Mitch Dubin
- Edited by: Norman Hollyn
- Music by: David Newman
- Production companies: New World Pictures; Cinemarque Entertainment
- Distributed by: Triton Pictures
- Release dates: June 6, 1990 (Philippines); February 1, 1991 (United States)
- Running time: 89 minutes
- Country: United States
- Languages: English; Portuguese
- Budget: US$5 million
- Box office: US$485,772

Meet the Applegates (released in the Philippines and the United States as The Applegates) is a 1990 American science fiction horror black comedy film directed by Michael Lehmann. It was filmed during 1988-89, but not released in the United States until 1991 due to the financial difficulties surrounding New World Pictures, its production company. It takes a dark, satirical look at the end of the world, nuclear holocausts, alienism and terrorism. It was filmed in Oshkosh, Appleton and Neenah, Wisconsin. It has gained a cult following.

The film focuses on a family of mutant shapeshifters from Brazil who have taken human form and settled in Ohio, set to cause nuclear holocaust and human extinction, but their experience of life is beset by very human vices and flaws.

== Plot ==
In a Brazilian rainforest, a logging crew is attacked by a family of huge shapeshifting mutant bug creatures called "Brazilian Cocorada". In a well-off suburban Ohio neighborhood, the Applegates, a typical-looking family, move in. They are secretly Brazilian Cocorada exploring human society on a mission to eradicate humans.

The Applegates are tasked with assimilating into the human culture. They have moved to the suburbs after the husband, Dick, got a job at a nuclear power plant. He is secretly working on a plan to cause a nuclear explosion that will rid the world of humans and leave the bugs in peace.

The Applegates start off living the American Dream. Dick is the patriarch, a loving father and the main breadwinner, while Jane is his loving wife and mother to Johnny and Sally. Johnny is initially a strait-laced A student but begins listening to heavy metal and becomes a pot-head. Sally starts out as the all American stereotypical high school girl. She is dating Vince Samson, who is the captain of the football team.

Dick and Jane's "perfect" marriage begins to crumble as they drift from each other. Dick begins having an affair at work and Jane becomes addicted to shopping and credit cards. While Johnny begins smoking marijuana with his metalhead buddies Kenny and Kevin, Johnny accidentally displays his true bug form. In a panic, he cocoons Kenny and Kevin and hides them. Sally, while being raped by Vince, displays her true form. Also in a panic, she cocoons him and hides him in the basement. As they drift away from normality and their mission, their aunt, Bea Cocorada, is dispatched to get the family back on track with their mission.

Chaos ensues when Dick's affair with his secretary Dottie leads to them both getting fired and Dottie deciding to blackmail him. Dick in panic cocoons her and hides her in his basement. At the bank, Jane is denied the continued usage of her credit card and makes a scene as a result. Jane, in an effort to pay off her debts, tries to rob a local convenience store but is caught by Sheriff Heidegger while fleeing the scene. With no other options, she cocoons Heidegger and returns to the family house. Johnny walks in on her hiding Heidegger.

Sally reveals she is pregnant and a lesbian, having become disillusioned with men after her interaction with Vince. The Applegates go into freefall when Jane's spending results in their possessions being repossessed. Just as they are at their lowest, journalist Rich Block and photographer Glen Shedd arrive to notify them that they have won a prize for being the most normal American family. However, after spotting Sally's pregnancy, they attempt to rescind the prize. In the struggle, Rich pushes Sally over, which induces labor. She gives birth to a large insect egg, which rolls towards Rich. Disgusted, he stomps on it and kills it. Rich and Glen are quickly cocooned and hidden away.

Bea arrives and is shocked at the Applegates' status. She then attempts to forge ahead with the mission but after the family realize they have grown to like living amongst the humans they decide they must prevent Bea from completing the mission. Dick intervenes and in the struggle he kills Bea, preventing the nuclear explosion. They save the town and the cocooned humans. The Applegates return to their lives in Brazil and are visited by the townspeople that grew to love them. Although the plant did not blow up, enough radiation was released to remove the hair from much of the town's population. Meanwhile, Bea survived and still intends to destroy the world.

== Cast ==
- Ed Begley Jr. as Richard Peter "Dick" Applegate
- Stockard Channing as Jane Applegate
- Dabney Coleman as Aunt Bea Cocorada
- Robert Jayne as John Richard "Johnny" Applegate
- Cami Cooper as Sally Applegate
- Glenn Shadix as Greg Samson
- Susan Barnes as Opal Withers
- Adam Biesk as Vince Sampson
- Savannah Smith Boucher as Dottie
- Roger Aaron Brown as Sheriff Heidegger
- Lee Garlington as Nita Samson
- Philip Arthur Ross as Kenny
- Steven Robert Ross as Kevin
- Mark Bringelson as Rich Block
- Chuck LaFont as Glen Shedd

== Release ==
Meet the Applegates was released in the Philippines by First Films as The Applegates on June 6, 1990, with "[f]ree cassette tapes to lucky patrons." Meet the Applegates was released in the United States by Triton Pictures on February 1, 1991.

=== Critical response ===
On review aggregator website Rotten Tomatoes the film has a score of 9% based on reviews from 11 critics, with an average rating of 4.2/10. The film was met with mixed reception.
