= List of American films of 1962 =

American films released in 1962

More than 147 American feature films were released in 1962.
Lawrence of Arabia won the Academy Award for Best Picture.

Paramount Pictures and Universal Pictures celebrated their 50th Anniversaries this year.

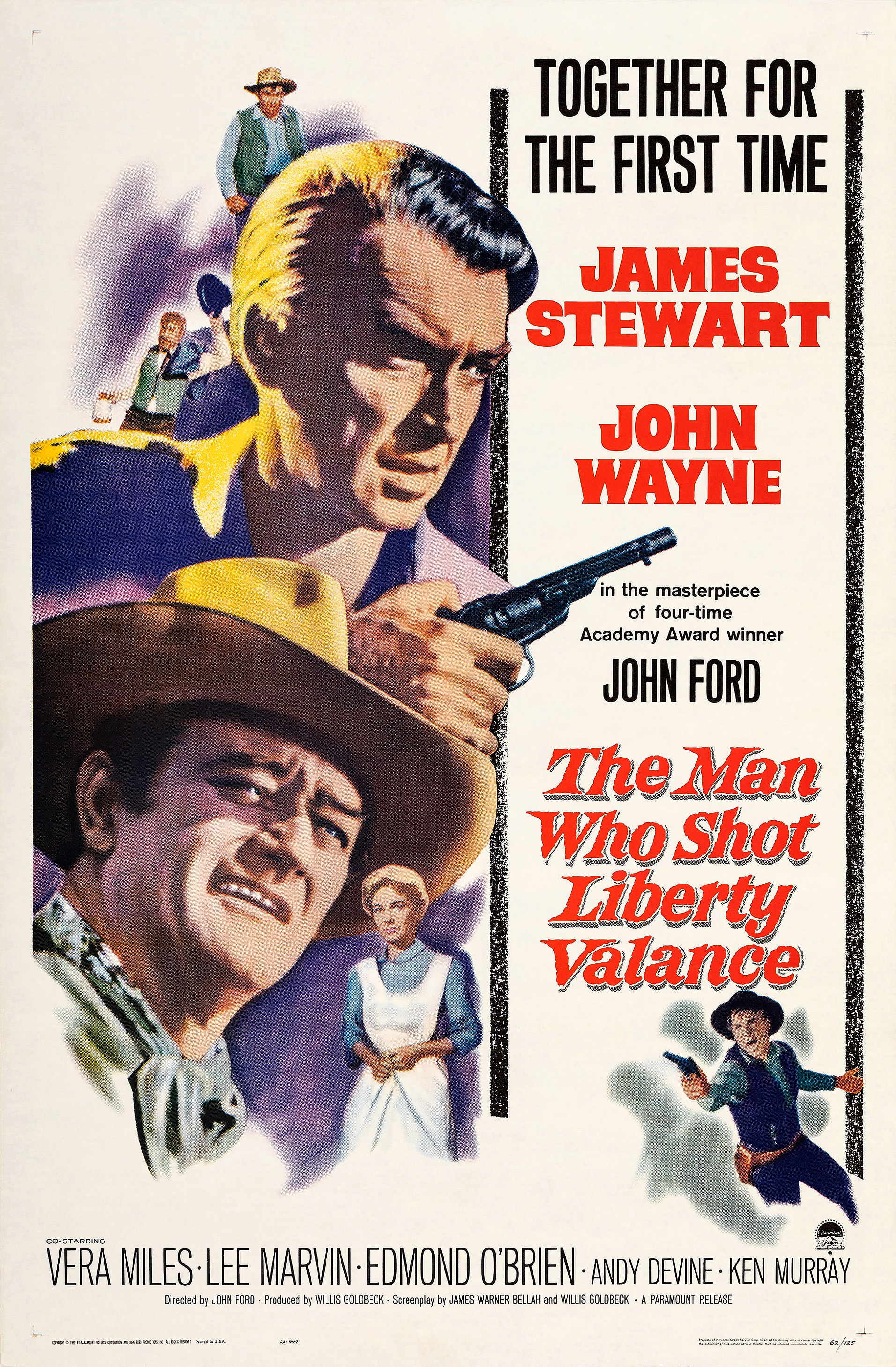
The Man Who Shot Liberty Valance starring John Wayne and James Stewart.

== Top-grossing films (U.S.) ==
| 1962; Rank | Title | Studio | Gross |
| 1. | Lawrence of Arabia | Columbia | $20,311,000 |
| 2. | The Longest Day | 20th Century Fox | $17,600,000 |
| 3. | In Search of the Castaways | Disney | $9,975,000 |
| 4. | The Music Man | Warner Brothers | $8,100,000 |
| 5. | That Touch of Mink | Universal | $7,942,000 |
| 6. | Mutiny on the Bounty | MGM | $7,410,000 |
| 7. | To Kill a Mockingbird | Universal | $7,112,000 |
| 8. | Hatari! | Paramount | $7,000,000 |
| 9. | Gypsy | Warner Brothers | $6,000,000 |
| 10. | Bon Voyage! The Interns | Disney; Columbia | $5,000,000 |

source: boxofficereport.com

== A-B ==
| Title | Director | Cast | Genre | Note |
|---|---|---|---|---|
| 13 West Street | Philip Leacock | Alan Ladd, Rod Steiger, Dolores Dorn | Drama | Columbia |
| The 300 Spartans | Rudolph Maté | Richard Egan, Diane Baker | Adventure | Fox |
| 40 Pounds of Trouble | Norman Jewison | Tony Curtis, Suzanne Pleshette, Phil Silvers | Comedy | Universal |
| Advise & Consent | Otto Preminger | Henry Fonda, Charles Laughton, Don Murray, Walter Pidgeon | Drama | Columbia; from novel by Allen Drury |
| Air Patrol | Maury Dexter | Willard Parker, Merry Anders, Robert Dix | Drama | 20th Century Fox |
| All Fall Down | John Frankenheimer | Eva Marie Saint, Warren Beatty | Drama | MGM |
| Bachelor Flat | Frank Tashlin | Terry-Thomas, Tuesday Weld, Celeste Holm | Comedy | Fox |
| Beauty and the Beast | Edward L. Cahn | Joyce Taylor, Mark Damon, Merry Anders | Romance | United Artists |
| The Bellboy and the Playgirls | Francis Ford Coppola, Fritz Umgelter | June Wilkinson | Comedy | American/West-German coproduction |
| Big Red | Norman Tokar | Walter Pidgeon, Janette Bertrand | Family | Disney |
| Billy Rose's Jumbo | Charles Walters | Doris Day, Jimmy Durante, Stephen Boyd, Martha Raye | Musical | MGM |
| Birdman of Alcatraz | John Frankenheimer | Burt Lancaster, Karl Malden, Telly Savalas | Drama | United Artists; four Oscar nominations |
| Black Gold | Leslie H. Martinson | Diane McBain, Fay Spain, Philip Carey | Adventure | Warner Bros. |
| Bon Voyage! | James Neilson | Fred MacMurray, Jane Wyman, Michael Callan | Family | Disney |
| Boys' Night Out | Michael Gordon | James Garner, Kim Novak, Tony Randall | Comedy | MGM |
| The Brain That Wouldn't Die | Joseph Green | Jason Evers, Virginia Leith | Science fiction | A.I.P. |
| The Broken Land | John A. Bushelman | Kent Taylor, Diana Darrin, Jody McCrea | Western | 20th Century Fox |
| Brushfire | Jack Warner, Jr. | John Ireland, Jo Morrow | Drama | Paramount |

== C-G ==
| Title | Director | Cast | Genre | Note |
|---|---|---|---|---|
| The Cabinet of Caligari | Roger Kay | Glynis Johns, Dan O'Herlihy | Horror | 20th Century Fox |
| Cape Fear | J. Lee Thompson | Robert Mitchum, Gregory Peck, Polly Bergen, Telly Savalas, Martin Balsam, Lori Martin, Barrie Chase | Film noir | Universal; remade in 1991 |
| The Captive City | Joseph Anthony | David Niven, Ben Gazzara, Martin Balsam, Lea Massari | Drama | A.I.P |
| Carnival of Souls | Herk Harvey | Candace Hilligoss, Art Ellison | Horror | Harcourt Productions |
| The Chapman Report | George Cukor | Shelley Winters, Jane Fonda, Claire Bloom | Drama | Warner Bros. |
| Confessions of an Opium Eater | Albert Zugsmith | Vincent Price, Philip Ahn | Crime | Allied Artists |
| Convicts 4 | Millard Kaufman | Ben Gazzara, Stuart Whitman, Sammy Davis Jr. | Drama | United Artists |
| The Couch | Owen Crump | Grant Williams, Shirley Knight | Horror | Warner Bros. |
| The Counterfeit Traitor | George Seaton | William Holden, Lilli Palmer, Hugh Griffith | War | Paramount |
| The Creation of the Humanoids | Wesley Barry | Don Megowan, Dudley Manlove | Science fiction | |
| David and Lisa | Frank Perry | Keir Dullea, Janet Margolin | Drama | Vision Associates Productions; two Oscar nominations |
| Days of Wine and Roses | Blake Edwards | Jack Lemmon, Lee Remick, Jack Klugman | Drama | Warner Bros.; Oscar for Best Song; five nominations |
| Deadly Duo | Reginald LeBorg | Marcia Henderson, Irene Tedrow | Drama | United Artists |
| Don't Knock the Twist | Oscar Rudolph | Chubby Checker, Lang Jeffries | Musical | Columbia |
| Dr. No | Terence Young | Sean Connery, Ursula Andress, Joseph Wiseman | Spy | United Artists |
| Escape from East Berlin | Robert Siodmak | Don Murray, Christine Kaufmann, Werner Klemperer | Drama | MGM; American/West-German coproduction |
| Escape from Zahrain | Ronald Neame | Yul Brynner, Sal Mineo, Jack Warden | Adventure | Paramount |
| Experiment in Terror | Blake Edwards | Glenn Ford, Lee Remick, Stefanie Powers, Ross Martin | Film noir | Columbia |
| FBI Code 98 | Leslie H. Martinson | Jack Kelly, Ray Danton | Crime | Warner Bros. |
| The Firebrand | Maury Dexter | Kent Taylor, Valentin de Vargas, Lisa Montell | Western | 20th Century Fox |
| Five Finger Exercise | Daniel Mann | Rosalind Russell, Jack Hawkins | Drama | Columbia |
| Five Miles to Midnight | Anatole Litvak | Sophia Loren, Anthony Perkins | Suspense | United Artists |
| Five Weeks in a Balloon | Irwin Allen | Red Buttons, Barbara Eden | Adventure | 20th Century Fox |
| Follow That Dream | Gordon Douglas | Elvis Presley, Anne Helm, Arthur O'Connell, Joanna Moore, Simon Oakland, Roland Winters | Musical | United Artists |
| The Four Horsemen of the Apocalypse | Vincente Minnelli | Glenn Ford, Lee J. Cobb, Charles Boyer | Drama | MGM |
| Freud: The Secret Passion | John Huston | Montgomery Clift, Susannah York, Larry Parks | Biography | Universal |
| Gay Purr-ee | Abe Levitow | (voices of) Judy Garland, Robert Goulet, Red Buttons | Animated Musical | Warner Bros. |
| Geronimo | Arnold Laven | Chuck Connors, Kamala Devi | Western | United Artists |
| Gigot | Gene Kelly | Jackie Gleason | Comedy | Fox |
| A Girl Named Tamiko | John Sturges | Laurence Harvey, France Nuyen | Drama | Paramount |
| Girls! Girls! Girls! | Norman Taurog | Elvis Presley, Stella Stevens, Laurel Goodwin | Musical | Paramount |
| Gypsy | Mervyn LeRoy | Rosalind Russell, Karl Malden, Natalie Wood | Musical | Warner Bros.; story of Gypsy Rose Lee; Golden Globe for Russell |

== H-M ==
| Title | Director | Cast | Genre | Note |
|---|---|---|---|---|
| Hand of Death | Gene Nelson | John Agar, Paula Raymond | Horror | 20th Century Fox |
| Hands of a Stranger | Newt Arnold | Paul Lukather, Joan Harvey | Horror | Allied Artists |
| Hatari! | Howard Hawks | John Wayne, Red Buttons, Elsa Martinelli | Action, Comedy | Paramount |
| Heaven and Earth Magic | Harry Everett Smith | | Animated | |
| Hell Is for Heroes | Don Siegel | Steve McQueen, Fess Parker, James Coburn, Bobby Darin | War | Paramount |
| Hemingway's Adventures of a Young Man | Martin Ritt | Richard Beymer, Diane Baker, Corinne Calvet | Drama | 20th Century Fox |
| Hero's Island | Leslie Stevens | James Mason, Rip Torn | Adventure | United Artists |
| Hitler | Stuart Heisler | Richard Basehart, Maria Emo, Cordula Trantow | Biopic | Allied Artists |
| The Horizontal Lieutenant | Richard Thorpe | Jim Hutton, Paula Prentiss, Jack Carter, Miyoshi Umeki | Comedy | MGM |
| House of Women | Crane Wilbur | Shirley Knight, Andrew Duggan, Constance Ford | Drama | Warner Bros. |
| How the West Was Won | John Ford, Henry Hathaway, George Marshall | James Stewart, Debbie Reynolds, Carroll Baker, Karl Malden | Western | MGM; nominated for 8 Academy Awards |
| If a Man Answers | Henry Levin | Bobby Darin, Sandra Dee, Cesar Romero | Comedy | Universal |
| In Search of the Castaways | Robert Stevenson | Hayley Mills, Maurice Chevalier, George Sanders | Family | Disney |
| Incident in an Alley | Edward L. Cahn | Harp McGuire, Virginia Christine | Crime | United Artists |
| The Inspector | Philip Dunne | Stephen Boyd, Dolores Hart, Leo McKern | Drama | 20th Century Fox |
| The Interns | David Swift | Cliff Robertson, Stefanie Powers, Telly Savalas, Michael Callan | Drama | Columbia; sequel in 1964 |
| The Intruder | Roger Corman | William Shatner, Beverly Lunsford | Drama | Filmgroup |
| Invasion of the Star Creatures | Bruno VeSota | Frank Ray Perilli, Gloria Victor | Comedy | American International Pictures |
| I Thank a Fool | Robert Stevens | Susan Hayward, Peter Finch | Drama | MGM |
| It Happened In Athens | Andrew Marton | Jayne Mansfield, Trax Colton | Comedy | Fox |
| It's Only Money | Frank Tashlin | Jerry Lewis, Zachary Scott, Joan O'Brien | Comedy | Paramount |
| Jack the Giant Killer | Nathan H. Juran | Kerwin Mathews, Torin Thatcher | Fantasy | United Artists |
| Jessica | Jean Negulesco | Angie Dickinson, Maurice Chevalier, Sylva Koscina, Agnes Moorehead | Drama | United Artists; filmed in Italy |
| Journey to the Seventh Planet | Sidney W. Pink | John Agar, Greta Thyssen | Science Fiction | American International Pictures |
| Kid Galahad | Phil Karlson | Elvis Presley, Gig Young, Lola Albright, Charles Bronson, Joan Blackman, Edward Asner | Musical | United Artists; remake of 1937 film |
| Lad, A Dog | Leslie H. Martinson, Aram Avakian | Peter Breck, Peggy McCay, Carroll O'Connor | Drama | Warner Bros. |
| Light in the Piazza | Guy Green | Olivia de Havilland, Rossano Brazzi, Barry Sullivan, Yvette Mimieux | Drama | MGM; from novel by Elizabeth Spencer |
| The Lion | Jack Cardiff | William Holden, Trevor Howard | Drama | 20th Century Fox; filmed in Kenya |
| Lolita | Stanley Kubrick | James Mason, Sue Lyon, Shelley Winters, Peter Sellers | Drama | MGM; from Vladimir Nabokov novel |
| Lonely Are the Brave | David Miller | Kirk Douglas, Walter Matthau, Gena Rowlands, Carroll O'Connor | Western | Universal; screenplay by Dalton Trumbo |
| Long Day's Journey Into Night | Sidney Lumet | Katharine Hepburn, Ralph Richardson, Jason Robards, Dean Stockwell | Drama | Embassy; based on Eugene O'Neill play |
| The Longest Day | Ken Annakin | John Wayne, Robert Mitchum, Henry Fonda, Richard Burton | War drama | Fox; nominated for 5 Academy Awards |
| The Magic Sword | Bert I. Gordon | Basil Rathbone, Estelle Winwood, Anne Helm | Fantasy | United Artists |
| The Main Attraction | Daniel Petrie | Pat Boone, Nancy Kwan | Drama | MGM |
| The Man Who Shot Liberty Valance | John Ford | James Stewart, John Wayne, Lee Marvin, Vera Miles | Western | Paramount; Academy Award nomination for Costume Design |
| The Manchurian Candidate | John Frankenheimer | Frank Sinatra, Laurence Harvey, Janet Leigh, Angela Lansbury, James Gregory, Henry Silva, John McGiver | Drama | United Artists; Richard Condon novel; Golden Globe for Lansbury; remade in 2004 |
| The Manster | George Breakston | Peter Dyneley, Tetsu Nakamura, Terri Zimmern, Jane Hylton | Horror | U.S./Japan |
| Mermaids of Tiburon | John Lamb | George Rowe, Diane Webber | Fantasy | Filmgroup |
| Merrill's Marauders | Samuel Fuller | Jeff Chandler, Ty Hardin, Claude Akins | War | Warner Bros. |
| The Miracle Worker | Arthur Penn | Anne Bancroft, Patty Duke, Victor Jory | Drama | United Artists; Helen Keller bio; Oscars for Bancroft and Duke |
| Moon Pilot | James Neilson | Tom Tryon, Edmond O'Brien, Dany Saval | Comedy | Disney |
| Mr. Hobbs Takes a Vacation | Henry Koster | James Stewart, Maureen O'Hara, Fabian, Reginald Gardiner, Marie Wilson, John McGiver | Comedy | Fox |
| The Music Man | Morton DaCosta | Robert Preston, Shirley Jones, Buddy Hackett, Ron Howard | Musical | Warner Bros.; from Meredith Willson play; five Oscar nominations; Remake of 2003 film |
| Mutiny on the Bounty | Lewis Milestone | Marlon Brando, Trevor Howard, Richard Harris, Richard Haydn, Hugh Griffith | Adventure | MGM; remake of 1935 film; seven Oscar nominations |
| My Geisha | Jack Cardiff | Shirley MacLaine, Yves Montand, Edward G. Robinson | Comedy | Paramount |

== N-S ==
| Title | Director | Cast | Genre | Note |
|---|---|---|---|---|
| Night of Evil | Richard Galbreath | Lisa Gaye, William Campbell | Drama | Astor Pictures |
| No Exit | Tad Danielewski | Viveca Lindfors, Rita Gam | Drama | American/Argentinian coproduction; based on Sartre play |
| No Man Is an Island | Richard Goldstone | Jeffrey Hunter | Drama | Universal |
| The Notorious Landlady | Richard Quine | Jack Lemmon, Kim Novak, Fred Astaire | Comedy | Columbia |
| The Nun and the Sergeant | Franklin Adreon | Robert Webber, Anna Sten | War | United Artists |
| Panic in Year Zero! | Ray Milland | Ray Milland, Jean Hagen, Frankie Avalon | Sci-Fi | A.I.P. |
| Paradise Alley | Hugo Haas | Hugo Haas, Carol Morris, Marie Windsor | Comedy Drama | Astor Pictures |
| Period of Adjustment | George Roy Hill | Jane Fonda, Tony Franciosa, Jim Hutton | Comedy | MGM; from Tennessee Williams play |
| Phaedra | Jules Dassin | Melina Mercouri, Anthony Perkins, Raf Vallone | Drama | American/French/Greek coproduction |
| The Pigeon That Took Rome | Melville Shavelson | Charlton Heston, Elsa Martinelli, Harry Guardino | Comedy | Paramount |
| Premature Burial | Roger Corman | Ray Milland, Hazel Court, Alan Napier | Horror | A.I.P. |
| Pressure Point | Hubert Cornfield | Sidney Poitier, Bobby Darin, Peter Falk | Drama | United Artists |
| The Reluctant Saint | Edward Dmytryk | Maximilian Schell, Ricardo Montalbán | Drama | |
| Requiem for a Heavyweight | Ralph Nelson | Anthony Quinn, Jackie Gleason, Mickey Rooney, Julie Harris | Sports, Drama | Columbia; written by Rod Serling |
| Ride the High Country | Sam Peckinpah | Joel McCrea, Randolph Scott, Mariette Hartley, James Drury, Warren Oates, R. G. Armstrong, L. Q. Jones | Western | MGM; Scott's final film |
| Rider on a Dead Horse | Herbert L. Strock | John Vivyan, Bruce Gordon, Kevin Hagen | Western | Allied Artists |
| The Ring of Terror | Clark L. Paylow | | Horror | |
| The Road to Hong Kong | Norman Panama | Bob Hope, Bing Crosby, Joan Collins | Comedy | United Artists; final Road picture |
| Rome Adventure | Delmer Daves | Angie Dickinson, Troy Donahue, Suzanne Pleshette | Romance | Warner Bros. |
| Safe at Home! | Walter Doniger | Mickey Mantle, Roger Maris, William Frawley | Family | Columbia |
| Saintly Sinners | Jean Yarbrough | Don Beddoe, Ellen Corby | Comedy Drama | United Artists |
| Samar | George Montgomery | Gilbert Roland, Ziva Rodann | Adventure | Warner Bros. |
| Satan in High Heels | Jerald Intrator | Grayson Hall, Meg Myles | Drama | |
| Satan Never Sleeps | Leo McCarey | William Holden, Clifton Webb, France Nuyen | Drama | 20th Century Fox |
| Secret File: Hollywood | Rudolph Cusumano | Robert Clarke, Francine York | Crime | Crown International Pictures |
| Sergeants 3 | John Sturges | Frank Sinatra, Dean Martin, Sammy Davis Jr., Peter Lawford, Joey Bishop | Western | United Artists; Rat Pack |
| Six Black Horses | Harry Keller | Audie Murphy, Joan O'Brien | Western | Universal |
| Something's Got to Give | George Cukor | Marilyn Monroe, Dean Martin | Comedy | Unfinished |
| The Spiral Road | Robert Mulligan | Rock Hudson, Gena Rowlands, Burl Ives, Neva Patterson | Adventure | Universal; based on Jan de Hartog novel |
| Stagecoach to Dancers' Rock | Earl Bellamy | Martin Landau, Warren Stevens, Judy Dan | Western | 20th Century Fox |
| Stark Fear | Ned Hochman | Skip Homeier, Beverly Garland | Thriller | Independent |
| State Fair | José Ferrer | Tom Ewell, Pat Boone, Pamela Tiffin, Ann-Margret, Alice Faye, Bobby Darin | Musical | 20th Century Fox; remake of 1933, 1945 films |
| Sweet Bird of Youth | Richard Brooks | Paul Newman, Geraldine Page, Ed Begley, Rip Torn, Mildred Dunnock, Shirley Knight | Drama | MGM; from Tennessee Williams play; Oscar for Begley |

== T-Z ==
| Title | Director | Cast | Genre | Note |
|---|---|---|---|---|
| Tales of Terror | Roger Corman | Vincent Price, Peter Lorre, Basil Rathbone | Horror | American International Pictures; anthology |
| Taras Bulba | J. Lee Thompson | Yul Brynner, Tony Curtis, Sam Wanamaker, Christine Kaufmann, Brad Dexter | Adventure | United Artists |
| Tarzan Goes to India | John Guillermin | Jock Mahoney | Adventure | MGM/UK |
| Tender Is the Night | Henry King | Jennifer Jones, Joan Fontaine, Jason Robards | Drama | 20th Century Fox; from F. Scott Fitzgerald novel; King's final film |
| That Touch of Mink | Delbert Mann | Cary Grant, Doris Day, Gig Young, Audrey Meadows, John Astin | Comedy | Universal |
| The Three Stooges Meet Hercules | Edward Bernds | The Three Stooges, Vicki Trickett | Comedy | Columbia |
| The Three Stooges in Orbit | Edward Bernds | The Three Stooges | Comedy | Columbia |
| To Kill a Mockingbird | Robert Mulligan | Gregory Peck, Mary Badham, Phillip Alford, Robert Duvall, Brock Peters, William Windom, Frank Overton, Paul Fix | Drama | Universal; based on novel by Harper Lee; nominated for eight Oscars |
| Tonight for Sure | Francis Ford Coppola | Karl Schanzer | Comedy | |
| Tower of London | Roger Corman | Vincent Price | Horror | United Artists; remake of 1939 film |
| Trauma | Robert M. Young | John Conte, Lynn Bari | Horror | Parade Releasing Organization |
| Two for the Seesaw | Robert Wise | Robert Mitchum, Shirley MacLaine | Drama | United Artists; from William Gibson play |
| Two Tickets to Paris | Greg Garrison | Joey Dee, Gary Crosby, Kay Medford | Musical | Columbia |
| Two Weeks in Another Town | Vincente Minnelli | Kirk Douglas, Edward G. Robinson, Cyd Charisse, Claire Trevor, George Hamilton | Drama | MGM |
| The Underwater City | Frank McDonald | William Lundigan, Julie Adams | Science fiction | Columbia |
| Walk on the Wild Side | Edward Dmytryk | Jane Fonda, Barbara Stanwyck, Laurence Harvey, Capucine | Drama | Columbia; based on Nelson Algren novel |
| War Hunt | Denis Sanders | John Saxon, Charles Aidman, Robert Redford | War | United Artists |
| What Ever Happened to Baby Jane? | Robert Aldrich | Bette Davis, Joan Crawford, Victor Buono | Thriller | Warner Bros.; five Oscar nominations |
| When the Girls Take Over | Russell Hayden | Marvin Miller, Jackie Coogan | Comedy | |
| Who's Got the Action? | Daniel Mann | Dean Martin, Lana Turner, Walter Matthau | Comedy | Paramount |
| Wild Guitar | Ray Dennis Steckler | Arch Hall Jr. | Musical | |
| The Wild Westerners | Oscar Rudolph | James Philbrook, Nancy Kovack, Duane Eddy, Guy Mitchell | Western | Columbia |
| Womanhunt | Maury Dexter | Lisa Lu, Berry Kroeger | Crime | 20th Century Fox |
| The Wonderful World of the Brothers Grimm | Henry Levin | Laurence Harvey, Claire Bloom, Barbara Eden | Biography | MGM; four Oscar nominations |
| The World's Greatest Sinner | Timothy Carey | | Drama | Never released |
| Young Guns of Texas | Maury Dexter | James Mitchum, Jody McCrea | Western | 20th Century Fox |
| Zotz! | William Castle | Tom Poston, Jim Backus, Margaret Dumont | Comedy | Columbia |

== See also ==
- 1962 in the United States
