= Carnival of Souls (1998 film) =

- Film poster
- Directed by: Adam Grossman
- Written by: Adam Grossman
- Based on: Carnival of Souls by Herk Harvey
- Produced by: Peter Soby; Lisa Harrison; Michael Meltzer
- Starring: Bobbie Phillips; Shawnee Smith; Larry Miller; Paul Johansson; Cleavant Derricks; Henry G. Sanders; Brendan Dillon
- Cinematography: Christopher Baffa
- Edited by: David Handman
- Music by: Andrew Rose
- Production company: Trimark Pictures
- Release date: August 21, 1998
- Running time: 86 minutes
- Country: United States
- Language: English
- Budget: $2 million

Carnival of Souls (also known as Wes Craven Presents: Carnival of Souls) is a 1998 American psychological horror film directed by Adam Grossman, and starring Bobbie Phillips, Larry Miller, and Shawnee Smith. A loose remake of Herk Harvey's 1962 film of the same name, it follows a woman haunted by a carnival clown who murdered her mother years prior. It was produced by Michael Meltzer, Peter Soby, and Lisa Harrison and executive produced by Wes Craven.

The project was originally conceived as a sequel to the original film before being reworked as a reimagining of the source material (Candace Hilligoss, the star of the original film, had written the screenplay for a sequel which went undeveloped). Filming took place in mid-1997, and reshoots were undertaken by executive producer Anthony Hickox following principal photography.

== Plot ==
In 1977, young Alex Grant witnessed a carnival clown named Louis Seagram—a brutal sadist—rape and murder her mother, Elaine. Twenty years later, Alex lives above the Mermaid Bar, a seaside tavern she inherited from her mother, where she works as a bartender along with her younger sister Sandra, an aspiring singer. Alex remains haunted by the memories of her mother's murder.

When Seagram is released from prison, he finds Alex and attacks her in her car. At gunpoint, Seagram forces Alex to drive to the carnival where he once worked, threatening to brutalize Sandra after he has murdered her. In an act of desperation, Alex drives the car off the pier, crashing into the water below. Alex subsequently awakens in her bathtub, the ordeal with Seagram being an apparent nightmare.

Alex begins to suffer further waking nightmares and visions involving Seagram and other ghoulish figures, including her first childhood encounter with him at the carnival, where Seagram first took an interest in her mother; following this encounter, Elaine began casually dating Seagram, who became a part of the family's lives and began molesting Alex. To calm her fears about Seagram returning, Alex begins researching his whereabouts, and is shocked to learn that he has recently been murdered following his release. Meanwhile, Sandra and Sid, a manager at the bar, begin to worry about Alex's deteriorating mental state.

Alex begins to be romantically pursued by Michael, a mysterious new regular patron at the bar, but continues to lose her grip on reality. Alex accompanies Michael on his boat, where the two begin to have sex, only for Michael to transform into a ghoulish creature that shape shifts into Seagram. Alex suddenly awakens on the ferris wheel at the carnival, the encounter with Michael seemingly only a dream. Alex is again pursued by Seagram in a hallucinogenic, carnivalesque landscape before awaking on the pier.

Some time later, Alex's car is removed from the water near the pier, with her and Seagram's corpses inside—it is revealed that Seagram did in fact attack her, and that the encounter and crash into the water did happen. In the tavern, a distraught Sandra picks up a ringing phone, only to hear the sounds of a carnival on the line.

== Cast ==
- Bobbie Phillips as Alex Grant
  - Raquel Beaudene as Young Alex Grant
- Shawnee Smith as Sandra Grant
  - Tiffanie Ann Taylor as Young Sandra Grant
- Larry Miller as Louis Seagram
- Paul Johansson as Michael
- Cleavant Derricks as Sid
- Henry G. Sanders as Officer Soby
- Brendan Dillon as Henry
- Anna K. McKown as Elaine
- Joseph S. Griffo as Photographer
- Robert LaSardo as Candyman
- Mark Paskell as Clown
- Ellen Albertini Dow as Mrs. Meltzer
- Andrew Craig as Worker

== Production ==
=== Development ===
Peter Soby was Director of Development at an independent production company, Shoreline Pictures, when a script came across his desk entitled, Carnival Souls II written by the star of the original film, Candace Hilligoss. A big fan of the original 1962 film, Soby was excited by the prospect of doing a remake, however Hilligoss's script featured the titular character from the original film, Mary Henry, coming back 35 years later as a ghost and engaging in a love story. Peter approached the original filmmakers, Herk Harvey and John Clifford who were still living in Lawrence, Kansas where they shot most of the original film. They explained that they gave Hilligoss permission to write her script, but claimed she had no official rights to the original film whatsoever despite it being in the public domain. Peter then negotiated with Harvey and Clifford the rights to create a "based on" film which eventually became known as Wes Craven Presents Carnival of Souls.

Soby wanted to ensure that Trimark Pictures could not use the original title because he was partnered with investor Matthew Irvine shortly thereafter negotiating with Harvey and Clifford to purchase the entire original film, negative and supposedly all the rights including remake rights. Soby also wanted original star Hilligoss involved as a producer and have a role in the "based on" film, but she wanted nothing to do with it if it was not her script and felt betrayed by Soby as well as Harvey and Clifford, so they had to part ways. Soby's first move was to approach Wes Craven to direct the film and Craven was interested, however he was heavy into development of a script entitled Scary Movie, which later became Scream (1996). Craven agreed to grandfather the project as an executive producer and Trimark Pictures eventually paid him to put his name in the title of the film.

Filming of Carnival of Souls took place in mid-1997. Sidney Berger, who played John Linden in the original film, has a brief cameo as a police officer; the two roles are his only credited film appearances.

After principal photography wrapped, Trimark Pictures conducted reshoots of the film by director Anthony Hickox, which included the filming of five additional scenes.

== Release ==
Carnival of Souls was released on August 21, 1998, on a limited theatrical run,

=== Home media ===
The film was released on DVD by Lionsgate on February 23, 1999. It was later released by VCI on January 15, 2001, and by Cinema Club on December 31 that same year.

On December 23, 2024, the German company NSM Records issued the film on Blu-ray in a three limited edition media books featuring different cover artwork.

== Reception ==
=== Critical response ===
On the review aggregator website Rotten Tomatoes, 20% of 5 critics' reviews are positive, with an average rating of 4.1/10.

Shawn Handling from HorrorNews.net stated that, although the film was "a decent little fright picture" and its style made up for its lack of originality, Handling criticized the film's "run-of the-mill" performances, writing, predictable story, lack of scares, and choice of music. TV Guide awarded the film 1/5 stars, calling the film "dismal", writing, "Though filled with modern-day horror contrivances, Grossman's film evokes none of the haunting atmosphere that distinguished Herk Harvey's eerily timeless original."

Matty Budrewicz of the horror film website The Schlock Pit praised the film in a 2021 retrospective, describing it as "a neat psychological frightener deserving of more than the ignominy it’s currently saddled with. A film that deals with the deep-rooted effects of trauma, Grossman’s robust if slightly predictable overhaul might seem a touch passé by modern standards now that the whole ‘facing your demons before you can find peace in the afterlife’ thing has been done to death, but it’s a fine example of how to do such explicitly Jacob’s Ladder–inspired material correctly."

== Sources ==
- Muir, John Kenneth (2011). Horror Films of the 1990s. Jefferson, North Carolina: McFarland. ISBN 978-0-786-48480-5.
- Weaver, Tom (2010). I Was a Monster Movie Maker: Conversations with 22 SF and Horror Filmmakers. Jefferson, North Carolina: McFarland. ISBN 978-0-786-46265-0.
