= Maurice Prather =

American film director

Maurice William Prather (September 6, 1926 - January 9, 2001) was an American motion picture and still photographer and film director. He was born in Miami, Florida, the son of Maurice J. Prather, a mechanic, cabinet maker, and woodworker, and Zora M. Prather, both of them born in Missouri. Young Maurice Jr. also had a younger sister, Laura Jo, some two years his junior.

The Prather family was living in Kansas City, Missouri, by 1930, where Maurice Jr.'s father found work at a local business called Greenwood's. By the time he was in his senior year of high school, Maurice Jr. had become interested in photography and had an after-school job as an assistant cameraman and laboratory technician at the Calvin Company in Kansas City, the largest production company for industrial films in the world. Upon turning 18 in 1944, Prather did not join the armed forces as most American men did during those wartime days (Prather may have suffered from a physical problem which prevented him from serving in the armed forces). Instead, he found work as a photographer of wartime airplanes for North American Aviation in Kansas City. In 1945, he became an engineering photographer for Trans World Airlines (TWA), who for many years had a hub in Kansas City. Still living with his parents in Kansas City, Prather then returned to the Calvin Company as an assistant cameraman for industrial films once again. This was the longest Prather held onto a job during these early days in Kansas City—two years (1946—1948). For some reason, he decided to abandon photography altogether for a one-year stint as a schedule clerk at a Sears-Roebuck department store in Kansas City. In 1949, he decided to get a college education and so enrolled in the journalism program at the University of Kansas in Lawrence, Kansas.

While at KU, Prather got a part-time job at the local Centron Corporation film studio, working as a photographer once again on educational and industrial short films. Prather's college activities included writing for the University Daily Kansan newspaper at KU and writing and photographing with several other students a "highlight book" of the 1951-52 season of the KU Jayhawks basketball team. Prather completed his journalism degree in June, 1953, and immediately went to work full-time at Centron. Prather put in nearly ten years at Centron, making over one hundred educational and industrial films, many of them prize-winners. Other than motion picture and still photography, he did sound recording on films and after a while began to direct films. It was while at Centron that Prather met his wife, Rozanne, whom he married in the late 1950s. He also first became acquainted with director Herk Harvey.

In 1959, Centron's camera shop, Mosser-Wolf Cameras, was sold to Prather and several business partners who opened Photon Cameras, a successful camera retail store and portrait studio that Prather served as an owner-operator of until his leaving Lawrence in 1962. In 1961, Prather photographed Carnival of Souls, Herk Harvey's Lawrence-produced feature film whose groundbreaking cinematography influenced the horror and science fiction film genres, although the movie didn't really find its audience until 1989. By the time Carnival of Souls was released in late 1962, Prather had left Lawrence with his wife to work as services coordinator and photographer for Horizon Productions, a small, Kansas City-based nontheatrical film production studio. In 1967, Prather moved over to Coleman Film Enterprises, another educational film company, which was headquartered in Shawnee Mission, Kansas. Prather worked there as a photographer until 1977, when he and his wife (who had by this time had two daughters, Anne and Stefanie), moved to California where Prather attempted to give a Hollywood filmmaking career a try. He had little success. "My wife and I had lived in California and really didn't feel like moving back there", Prather said in a 2000 interview in Kansas City after the revival of interest in Carnival of Souls. "I did a lot of movie work and all of the still work for Centron. I prefer to do still photography. I came here to Kansas City [in 1983] and I got out of the motion picture business because it was too expensive. A lot of the stuff I did was food photography. I love food photography. I also did portraits to please myself, not to please the person I was photographing. You get a little old lady saying, 'Make me look like I'm 20 years old.'"

The revival of interest in his old feature film Carnival of Souls during the 1990s was a pleasant surprise for Prather, but for some reason he did not attend the 1989 reunion of the film's cast and crew in Lawrence, even though he was already listed in the advertisements and programs for the event as one of the featured speakers during the ceremonies. Prather died at the age of 74 on January 9, 2001, at his home in Kansas City, of an unspecified cause, most likely renal failure. However, Prather will remain well-known and widely praised for his innovative and creative photography in Carnival of Souls, as the film continues to be viewed in homes and theaters and aired on television, amazingly, after nearly forty years, when most black-and-white, low-budget films from the 1960s were long forgotten after less than only two or three years.
