= The Cabinet of Caligari =

1962 film by Roger Kay

- Theatrical release poster
- Directed by: Roger Kay
- Written by: Robert Bloch
- Based on: The Cabinet of Dr. Caligari (1920 film) by Carl Mayer; Hans Janowitz
- Produced by: Roger Kay
- Starring: Glynis Johns; Dan O'Herlihy; Richard Davalos; Lawrence Dobkin; Estelle Winwood; Constance Ford
- Cinematography: John L. Russell
- Edited by: Archie Marshek
- Music by: Gerald Fried
- Production company: Associated Producers Inc
- Distributed by: 20th Century Fox
- Release dates: May 25, 1962 (Los Angeles); May 26, 1962 (New York City)
- Running time: 105 minutes
- Country: United States
- Language: English
- Budget: $1 million

The Cabinet of Caligari is a 1962 American psychological horror film directed and produced by Roger Kay, and starring Glynis Johns and Dan O'Herlihy. It is loose remake of the 1920 German silent film The Cabinet of Dr. Caligari, though it shares very few similarities except for some character names, an asylum setting, and the main plot twist. The screenplay was written by Robert Bloch.

The film was released by 20th Century Fox on May 25, 1962, on a double feature with Hand of Death (1962). It was a critical and financial failure.

== Plot ==
Motorist Jane Lindstrom has a tire blowout and seeks assistance at an estate owned by the polite and erudite Caligari. After spending the night there, she finds that Caligari will not let her leave; he proceeds to ask some personal questions and shows her pictures that offend her.

Prevented by guards from leaving and unable to use the telephone, Jane seeks allies among the other guests. She finds only three possible candidates: the older Paul, the younger Mark, for whom she has romantic desires, and a lively elderly woman named Ruth. After seeing Ruth tortured, Jane goes to Paul who convinces her to confront Caligari. Jane does so and tries to seduce him, as she suspects he has been spying on her in the bath. After her attempts fail, Caligari reveals that he and Paul are one and the same person, Jane runs down a corridor of wildly shifting imagery that acts as a transition.

Finally, it is revealed that Jane is a mental patient and everything the audience has seen up to this point has been her distortion of the institute she was in: the personal questions were psychoanalysis, the pictures were Rorschach blots, Ruth's torture was shock treatment, and even Caligari's coat of arms was a distorted version of the medical caduceus symbol. Cured, Jane is taken from the asylum by Mark, now revealed to be her son.

== Cast ==
Credits from the AFI Catalog of Feature Films:

- Glynis Johns as Jane
- Dan O'Herlihy as Paul/Dr. Caligari
- Dick Davalos as Mark
- Lawrence Dobkin as David
- Constance Ford as Christine
- J. Pat O'Malley as Perkins
- Vicki Trickett as Jeanie
- Estelle Winwood as Ruth
- Doreen Lang as Vivian
- Charles Fredericks as Bob

== Production ==
Plans to create a remake of The Cabinet of Dr. Caligari had existed since at least 1934, with original director Robert Wiene pitching a sound remake to a French studio, intending to cast Jean Cocteau in a leading role. Samuel Goldwyn, who had distributed the original film in the United States, obtained the remake rights after abortive attempts at a remake or sequel in 1944 and 1947. They were licensed to Robert L. Lippert, whose Associated Producers Inc. produced B movies for distribution by 20th Century Fox. He assigned the project to newcomer French director Roger Kay, who had directed Grand Guignol theatre in Paris and television in the United States. He also had degrees in psychology. Caligari would be his feature directorial debut, and one of only two feature films he directed. Roger Kay persuaded Robert Bloch "to drop the Dr from the original title but do a story with enough similarity to be recognizable as an homage." At one stage, the film was just known as Caligari.

Robert Lippert's movies around this time normally cost $500,000, but Lippert allowed extra funds for this movie. It was shot over 25 days. Harry Spalding, who worked for Lippert, later recalled that everyone in their organization thought making the film was a bad idea except for Lippert. He says the director hired Robert Bloch to write the script, but they had a falling out and the director re-wrote the script himself. Bloch's signing was announced in July 1961. Kay tried to claim sole screenwriting credit, but Bloch took the matter to Writers Guild of America arbitration, who awarded Bloch sole writing credit on the final film.

Glynis Johns was signed to star in November. Maury Dexter, head of Lippert's company, says Lippert told him "to give Roger [Kay] a wide berth because he expected great things from him."

Kay used a colour chart when making the film. He went through the script and allocated a colour representing the emotion the audience was to feel." The new Caligari is completely modern", said Kay during filming. "I don't want to sound presumptuous but I am trying to get the Pirandello approach that says nothing is what it appears to be. The thesis behind the damsel in distress, behind the little thrills and shocks is, What is reality?""This picture is going to cause a lot of talk", said Lippert. Dexter says once he read the script and saw how different the film would be from the original, he advised Lippert to fire Kay, but Lippert backed the director. He also says Kay yelled at Glynis Johns during filming and Johns ran off the set; Lippert forced Kay to apologize so filming could continue.

== Reception ==
According to Dexter, the film was a critical and financial failure.

In 1963, Kay said he "disowns" the film, blaming Fox for turning it into a "lurid, sex charged picture" and claiming the version released was "considerably different" from his version. He said a copy of his original cut was with the Museum of Modern Art.

Lippert wanted to reunite O'Herlihy and Johns in an adaptation of Trilby, but no film resulted.

== See also ==
- List of American films of 1962
