= Nicolas Coster =

American actor (1933–2023)

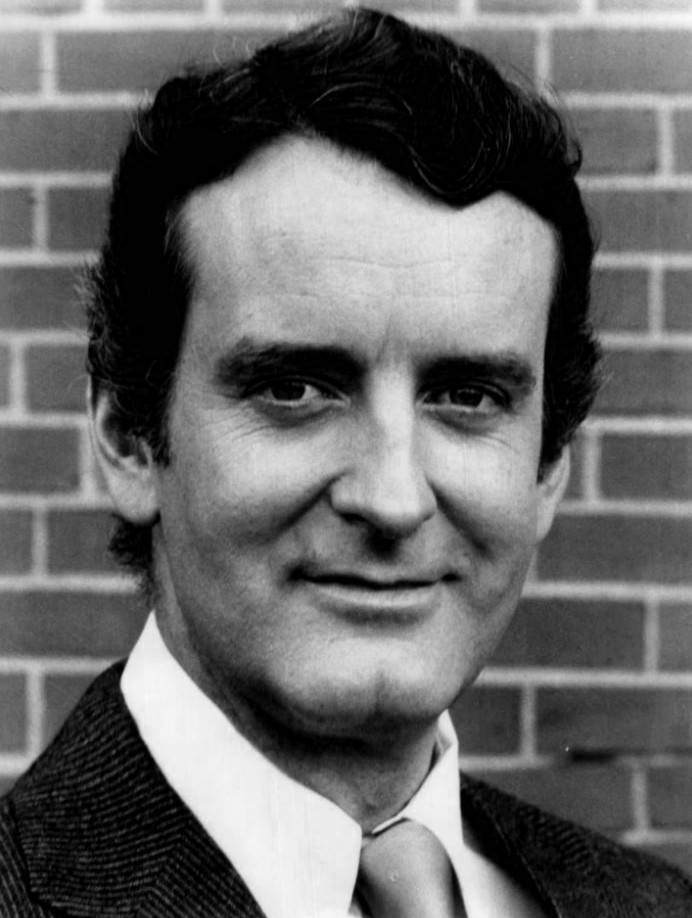
- Coster in 1975
- Born: Nicolas Dwynn Coster; December 3, 1933; London, England, U.K.
- Died: June 26, 2023 (aged 89); Hallandale Beach, Florida, U.S.
- Education: Royal Academy of Dramatic Art
- Occupations: Actor; scuba instructor
- Years active: 1953–2023
- Spouse: Candace Hilligoss (div. 1981)
- Children: 2

Nicolas Dwynn Coster (December 3, 1933 – June 26, 2023) was an American actor, most known for his work in daytime drama with roles as Lionel Lockridge on the series Santa Barbara and Robert Delaney on the series Another World. He also was known as a character actor on nighttime television series, such as Wonder Woman, Buck Rogers in the 25th Century, T. J. Hooker, and Star Trek: The Next Generation.

== Life and career ==
Coster was born in London on December 3, 1933, to an American mother and a New Zealand father who was a London theatre critic and marine commander. He was raised in the United States, primarily in California.

Coster returned to England to study acting at the Royal Academy of the Dramatic Art. He also studied acting with Lee Strasberg in New York City. Coster was in Twigs with Sada Thompson, Seesaw with Michele Lee, Otherwise Engaged with Tom Courtenay, and The Little Foxes with Elizabeth Taylor, which was staged on Broadway and the Victoria Theatre in London.

Coster appeared in the NBC soap opera Young Doctor Malone. He created the role of Professor Paul Britton on The Secret Storm, a role he played in 1964 and from 1967 to 1968. He played John Eldridge in the prime time serialized drama Our Private World and on As the World Turns. His first appearance on television was an episode of The U.S. Steel Hour in 1959. Coster appeared more than 80 times on 36 television shows, notably in the role of David Warner, the father of character Blair Warner, on the sitcom The Facts of Life. Coster created the role of Robert Delaney on Somerset in March 1970 and later moved to Another World playing the same character. He played gangster-turned-informant Anthony Makana on One Life to Live, but left that series to create the role of Lionel Lockridge on Santa Barbara. He played kidnapper Steve Andrews on the ABC soap opera All My Children and returned to Another World for its 25th anniversary in 1989. He returned to his role on Santa Barbara in 1990 until the show was canceled in January 1993. He had portrayed the character of Lionel Lockridge in a total of 599 episodes. He appeared on As the World Turns from 1993 to 1995.

=== Personal life ===
Coster was a scuba diving instructor and maintained a foundation that organizes sailing trips and teaches scuba diving for people who are disabled, holding a captain's license. He married actress Candace Hilligoss (divorced 1981), with whom he had two children.

Coster died at a hospital in Hallandale Beach, Florida on June 26, 2023, at the age of 89, according to his daughter.

== Selected film and television roles ==
- Titanic (1953) - Seaman (uncredited)
- The Desert Rats (1953) - Medic (uncredited)
- Sea of Lost Ships (1953) - Cadet Wilson (uncredited)
- The Outcast (1954) - Asa Polsen
- The Black Shield of Falworth (1954) - Humphrey, Young Squire (uncredited)
- The Eternal Sea (1955) - Student (uncredited)
- City of Shadows (1955) - Roy Fellows
- My Blood Runs Cold (1965) - Harry Lindsay
- The Sporting Club (1971) - James Quinn
- 1776 (1972) - South Carolina Delegate (uncredited)
- All the President's Men (1976) - Markham
- Ebony, Ivory & Jade (1976) - Linderman
- MacArthur (1977) - Colonel Huff
- The Big Fix (1978) - Spitzler
- Slow Dancing in the Big City (1978) - David Fillmore
- The Word (1978, TV Mini-Series) - Peter Ajemian
- A Fire in the Sky (1978, TV Movie) - Governor
- Little House on the Prairie - Lansford Ingalls
- Goldengirl (1979) - US Olympic Team Doctor
- Just You and Me, Kid (1979) - Harris
- The Concorde... Airport '79 (1979) - Dr. Stone
- The Electric Horseman (1979) - Fitzgerald
- Little Darlings (1980) - Mr. Whitney
- The Hunter (1980) - Poker Player (uncredited)
- Why Would I Lie? (1980) - Walter
- Stir Crazy (1980) - Warden Henry Sampson
- The Misadventures of Sheriff Lobo (1981) - Chief J.E. Carson
- The Pursuit of D.B. Cooper (1981) - Avery
- Reds (1981) - Paul Trullinger
- Princess Daisy (1983 TV Movie) - Matty Firestone
- Hardcastle and McCormick - Thomas Quinlan
- Beverly Hills Madam (1986) - Uncle Edgar
- Big Business (1988) - Hunt Shelton
- Star Trek - The Next Generation (1989) season 3, episode 16 - Admiral Haftel
- How I Got into College (1989) - Dr. Phillip Jellinak Sr.
- Who's the Boss? (1989) - Lowell Michaels
- Betsy's Wedding (1990) - Harry Lovell
- By Dawn's Early Light (1990 TV Movie) - General Renning
- The Dukes of Hazzard: Hazzard in Hollywood (2000, TV Movie) - Ezra Bushmaster
- Race (2008) - Jack Gibson
- Cold Turkey (2013) - Steve Utley
- A Winter Rose (2016) - Drunk
- The Deep Ones (2020) - Bob Finley
- Lessons in Chemistry (2023 TV-mini-series) - season 1, episode 3 - Paul Astor

== Bibliography ==
=== Books ===
- Coster, Nicolas (March 31, 2021). Another Whole Afternoon (1st ed.). Sarasota: First Edition Design Publishing. p. 224. ISBN 978-1506910246.
