= The Tab Hunter Show =

American TV series (1960–1961)

- Genre: Sitcom
- Created by: Stanley Shapiro
- Starring: Tab Hunter
- Theme music composer: Pete Rugolo
- Country of origin: United States
- Original language: English
- No. of seasons: 1
- No. of episodes: 32

Production
- Camera setup: Single-camera
- Running time: 30 minutes
- Production companies: Famous Artists Productions; Shunto Productions

Original release
- Network: NBC
- Release: September 18, 1960 – April 30, 1961

The Tab Hunter Show is an American sitcom starring Tab Hunter which centers around a young comic-strip artist and his romantic adventures. The Tab Hunter Show originally aired on NBC from September 18, 1960, until April 30, 1961.

== Synopsis ==
Tab Hunter in a promotional photograph for The Tab Hunter Show.

Paul Morgan is 29-year-old cartoonist who draws the daily comic strip Bachelor at Large. The strip is essentially his diary, based on his own life as a carefree bachelor in Malibu, California, which is filled with romantic adventures — and misadventures — both in Malibu and during his trips to Europe. Paul perpetually is surrounded by beautiful young women and spends a lot of time trying to gain the favor of a woman he meets or getting out of a relationship that seems to be turning serious. There often are complications, and he often gets in over his head while trying to impress a woman. His best friend Peter Fairfield III is a rich-but-stingy playboy who loves beautiful women, fashion, and fast cars and often is mixed up in Paul's romantic romps. Paul's housekeeper, Thelma, disapproves of the steady stream of women passing through Paul's life and frequently tells him so.

Paul works for Comics, Inc., where his boss is John Larsen. Paul often exasperates Larsen, who is dumbfounded by Paul's antics and frequently has difficulty keeping Paul on task and on deadline in drawing his comic strip. Bachelor at Large is wildly popular and a big moneymaker for the company, however, so as long as Paul turns his strips in on time, Larsen forgives his transgressions.

== Cast ==
- Tab Hunter as Paul Morgan
- Richard Erdman as Peter Fairfield III
- Jerome Cowan as John Larsen
- Reta Shaw as Thelma

== Episodes ==
No.	Title	Directed by	Written by	Original release date
1	"One Blond Too Many"	Norman Tokar	Stanley Shapiro; Maurice Richlin	September 18, 1960
Paul tries to get himself out of two relationships — one with a woman who loves to cook and one with a woman who loves to fix things, including cars. Mary Murphy, Liliane Montevecchi, Joan Staley, and Mary Tyler Moore guest-star.
2	"For Money or Love"	Unknown	Unknown	September 25, 1960
Paul plans to date Peter's cousin Hilary, who is very rich — but Peter warns him that she also is a pennypincher. Elizabeth Montgomery and Charles Fredericks guest-star.
3	"My Brother, the Hero"	Unknown	Unknown	October 2, 1960
When Paul's younger brother Chris tells his friend at military school, Harold Keebler, about Paul's wartime heroics in the military, Harold counters by bragging about his father′s military exploits, so the two boys decide to prove whether Paul or Harold's father is the bigger hero. John McGiver, Pat Close, and Charles Saari guest-star.
4	"Be My Guest"	Unknown	Unknown	October 9, 1960
Paul meets a woman named Stephanie and takes a liking to her dog, and that makes her want to marry him. Nita Talbot and Kaye Elhardt guest-star.
5	"Operation Iceberg"	Unknown	Unknown	October 16, 1960
Paul meets Lila Westbrook, a very rich editor. Lila is very cold and distant, but Paul believes he can trick her into warming up to him. Pat Crowley and Autumn Russell guest-star.
6	"The Matchmaker"	Unknown	Unknown	October 23, 1960
Larsen runs a contest, and first prize is a week in Hollywood for a lucky woman with Paul as her escort. The winner is Mollie Coburn — an elderly and motherly woman. Spring Byington, Howard McNear, and Jody Warner guest-star.
7	"I Love a Marine"	Unknown	Unknown	October 30, 1960
Paul receives a telegram informing him that Buddy Parker, a United States Marine who saved his life during the Korean War, is coming to visit him. Buddy turns out to be a nurse — and a woman. Nancy Walker, Jackie Coogan, and Doodles Weaver guest-star.
8	"Double Trouble"	Unknown	Unknown	November 6, 1960
Paul meets a beautiful woman named Barbara on the beach and arranges a dinner date with her — but her twin sister Penelope shows up at the restaurant instead and gives Paul the cold shoulder. Gena Rowlands, Beverly Englander, and Marilyn Molloy guest-star.
9	"The Doll in the Bathing Suit"	Unknown	Unknown	November 13, 1960
An undiscovered actress named Ginny wants to gain publicity in Hollywood by faking her own suicide in front of Paul's house, pretending to try to drown herself. An unwitting Paul ruins it by rushing to save her — and gets punched for his efforts. Tuesday Weld, Elaine Stewart, and Harry Jackson guest-star.
10	"Hot and Cold"	Unknown	Unknown	November 20, 1960
Paul claims to be exhausted by his hectic social life and goes to the Happy Valley Health Farm for a rest. Peter does not believe that Paul really would leave Malibu for a boring health resort, so he follows Paul to see what he is up to. It turns out that everyone else at the health farm is at least 60 years old — except for one beautiful young woman. Sarah Marshall and Joe Flynn guest-star.
11	"My Darling Teacher"	Unknown	Unknown	November 27, 1960
Paul's younger brother Chris comes to Paul's house so that he can have a quiet place to study for an upcoming math test at school — but soon Chris is having fun on the beach and Paul is the one at home with the math books. Pat Close, Jack Albertson, and Lori Nelson guest-star.
12	"One Night in Paris"	Unknown	Unknown	December 4, 1960
Paul travels to France to spend a night in Paris, but meets a pretty author, Lucienne Palette, and decides to stay longer. Meanwhile, Larsen is expecting to meet a new client, a French author, in Malibu — and her name is Lucienne Palette. Luciana Paluzzi and Sandra Dale guest-star.
13	"Devil to Pay"	Unknown	Unknown	December 11, 1960
Peter is a committed bachelor, but when his grandmother sends him a telegram ordering him to come home for a wedding, he thinks it is for his own wedding. Diana Millay guest-stars.
14	"How to Lose a Girl"	Unknown	Unknown	December 18, 1960
After Larsen berates Paul for missing a deadline for submitting his comic strip, he decides that Paul needs to face some competition, so he hires a charming cartoonist, Betty Boyden, to draw the comic strip Bachelor Girl and threatens to replace Paul's strip with hers. Paul decides that he needs to remove the threat by getting Betty married so that she will give up cartooning, but is disturbed to discover that the man Betty draws in her comic strip looks a lot like him. Chris White and Olan Soule guest-star.
15	"Happily Unmarried"	Unknown	Unknown	December 25, 1960
Larsen sends a woman named Dottie as a messenger to tell Paul to quit playing and get back to work — and Paul thinks Dottie is beautiful and sexy. Dean Miller and Carol Byron guest-star.
16	"Portia Go Home"	Norman Tokar	Richard Morgan	January 1, 1961
When a young woman named Laurie McBain claims that the heroine in Paul's comic strip is based on her and sues him for invasion of privacy, he goes to court — where his attorney is a beautiful young woman who just graduated from Harvard Law School. Joanna Barnes and Vicki Trickett guest-star.
17	"Turnabout"	Unknown	Unknown	January 8, 1961
Paul is unable to get his work done because of constant interruptions by telephone calls and people ringing his doorbell, so he talks Peter into exchanging houses with him for a few days. Ruta Lee and Byron Morrow guest-star.
18	"Weekend on Ice"	Unknown	Unknown	January 15, 1961
While Paul and Peter are vacationing at the Snow Valley winter resort, Peter brags that a pretty woman and fellow guest at the resort, Julie Carroll, finds him attractive. Paul decides to impress Julie himself by demonstrating his ice skating skills. Suzanne Pleshette and Jack Albertson guest-star.
19	"Girl Overboard"	Unknown	Unknown	January 22, 1961
Paul has been hired to draw some cartoons in Europe, so Paul, Peter, and Larsen set out on a transatlantic voyage aboard an ocean liner. During the voyage, Paul and Peter meet a beautiful woman named Diana who threatens to jump overboard unless one of them agrees to marry her. Liliane Montevecchi and Raymond Bailey guest-star.
20	"The Art Patron"	Unknown	Unknown	January 29, 1961
When Paul and Peter go girl-hunting in Paris, Paul pursues the affections of a woman named Josette and Peter those of a woman named Danielle. Stanley Adams and Roxane Berard guest-star.
21	"The Golden Arrow"	Unknown	Unknown	February 5, 1961
In England, Paul falls for a beautiful British girl on a boat train to London, not realizing that she is Lady Diana Masters, who is terribly bored with the life of the nobility. Diana Millay, Richard Peel, Ben Wright, and Maurice Dallimore guest-star.
22	"Galatea"	Unknown	Unknown	February 12, 1961
After Paul decides to run an "Ideal Girl" contest in London, his Cockney charwoman Maggie takes great interest in it. Antoinette Bower, Clarke Gordon, Barbara Bricker, and Owen McGiveney guest-star.
23	"Me and My Shadow"	William J. Hole Jr.	Dick Conway; Roland MacLane	February 19, 1961
Paul has made it home to Malibu safely, but after Paul's escapades in Europe, Larsen is concerned that Paul could someday be in a serious, or even fatal, accident, bringing his comic strip — and the profits it generates for Larsen's company — to an end. To Paul's disgust, Larsen insures Paul's life for a substantial sum and hires an apprentice cartoonist, Emory Farnsworth, to assist Paul and learn to draw his strip so that he can cover for Paul if Paul ever is sidelined by injury. The eager Emory proceeds to drive Paul crazy because he thinks he has to do everything Paul does. Norman Fell, Jack Albertson, Joan Staley, Daniele De Metz, and Jane Wald guest-star.
24	"The Movie Set"	Unknown	Unknown	February 26, 1961
Also entitled "A Star Is Born." When a movie company wants to shoot some scenes at Paul′s house while Paul is away, Peter gives them permission to do so, mainly because the movie's cast includes an attractive woman. Leo Fuchs, Suzanne Lloyd, William Bakewell, Anita Sands, and Eleanor Audley guest-star.
25	"Sultan for a Day"	Unknown	Unknown	March 5, 1961
Paul and Peter visit Las Vegas to do some gambling, and an early winning streak seems to justify their premonition that they will be lucky. Allen Jenkins, Loei Nelson, Anita Sands, Shirley Mitchell, and Joe Scott guest-star.
26	"Holiday in Spain"	Unknown	Unknown	March 12, 1961
While Paul is on vacation in Spain he meets a beautiful woman named Gitana, Spain′s most famous female matador. Linda Cristal, Lawrence Dobkin, and José Prieto guest-star.
27	"Italian Riviera"	Unknown	Unknown	March 19, 1961
To distract Larsen and Peter, Paul talks a beautiful young Swedish woman into posing as a mermaid. Chana Eden, Benny Rubin, and Annalena Lund guest-star.
28	"Crazy Over Horses"	Unknown	Unknown	March 26, 1961
Paul wants to date Ariel Evans, a British woman whose only interest is horses, and decides that the only way to win her affection is to show an interest in them, too — so he offers to train a horse. Audrey Dalton, Tommy Cook, and Jack Albertson guest-star.
29	"Dream Boy"	Unknown	Unknown	April 9, 1961
Peter is frustrated because Paul always "gets the girl," but after he falls into a deep sleep he dreams of a world in which he is a dashing prince who women find irresistible. Joanna Barnes, Sig Ruman, Rolfe Sedan, and Ulla Stronstedt guest-star.
30	"Personal Appearance"	Unknown	Unknown	April 16, 1961
Television host Gordon Harris visits Paul's house to interview Paul in his living room, but Peter feels left out — so after Gordon and Paul go on the air, Peter interrupts to complain about not being invited to join Paul on the show. Peter Leeds, Vicki Trickett, Yuki Shimoda, Charles Lane, Michael Lane, and Karl Davis guest-star.
31	"Those Happy College Days"	Unknown	Unknown	April 23, 1961
Paul is not interested in an opportunity to lecture at a college — until he finds out it is a women's college. Mabel Albertson, Jody Warner, Susie Carnell, Herb Ellis, and Anita Sands guest-star.
32	"The Invitation"	Unknown	Unknown	April 30, 1961
Hoping to win a contract from an exotic Indian maharani to write her memoirs, Larsen talks Paul into vacating his house so he can use it for a dinner party with her. Paul and Peter do not want to miss seeing Larsen in action as he charms the maharani, however, so they masquerade as servants while Larsen tries to get rid of them. Ziva Rodann, Ellen Corby, and Anita Sands guest-star.

== Production ==
For the 1960–1961 television season, NBC hoped to counter criticism that network television aired too many violent action-adventure shows by creating a four-hour Sunday-evening lineup completely devoted to family-friendly programming. A particularly important component of the new lineup involved replacing the live comedy and variety shows that previously had dominated the 8:00–9:00 p.m. slot on Sunday evenings on NBC with filmed situation comedies. National Velvet at 8:00 p.m. and The Tab Hunter Show at 8:30 p.m. were the situation comedies NBC chose to fill the hour beginning in September 1960.

Stanley Shapiro created and produced The Tab Hunter Show, which gave 1950s movie heartthrob Tab Hunter his own television show in the hope of attracting young women and girls to NBC on Sunday evenings, and each week the show featured a beautiful young woman as a guest star in the hope of attracting young men and boys as viewers as well. When NBC announced the show in March 1960, it referred to it with the title Bachelor at Large, but by mid-April 1960 it had received the name The Tab Hunter Show.

Tab Hunter says he owned fifty percent of the show. He and his agent Dick Clayton formed Shunto Productions, and NBC funded the pilot which was shot at MGM studios in Culver City. Stanley Shapiro was the writer and producer, but left the show after directing the pilot, which Hunter felt hurt the show. Norman Tokar became the director. In October 1960 Phil Rapp was brought in as the new producer, replacing executive producer Alex Gottlieb and producer-director Norman Tokar who both left the show.

The show cost an estimated $50,000 a week.

When The Tab Hunter Show premiered in September 1960, Hunter was at the peak of his career, having received acclaim for his performance in the 1958 theatrical film Damn Yankees, and he explained that he wanted to switch to a television series — considered a noteworthy development in the entertainment world at the time — because he felt that it was a medium that would allow him greater freedom to act. It was his first comedic role.

Zeke Zekley, best known for his work on George McManus's comic strip Bringing Up Father, drew the strips for The Tab Hunter Show. Pete Rugolo composed the show's theme music.

In July 1960, Hunter was arrested for beating his dog, a charge that later was dropped when it turned out that Hunter's neighbor had fabricated the story out of spite. The arrest nonetheless marred the show's September 1960 premiere.

== Release ==
The Tab Hunter Show premiered on September 18, 1960, and aired on Sundays at 8:30 p.m. throughout its run. Unable to compete in its time slot with The Ed Sullivan Show, The Tab Hunter Show drew moderate ratings; after its last new episode aired on April 30, 1961, NBC announced its cancellation in May 1961 after a single season. Prime-time reruns of the show continued until September 10, 1961.

The Tab Hunter Show had greater success in the United Kingdom, where the BBC broadcast 24 episodes of it from January 5 to September 26, 1961, at first on Thursdays at 7:30 p.m. and then on Tuesdays at 8:00 p.m.

== Critical response ==
When The Tab Hunter Show premiered in September 1960, critics generally gave it mediocre reviews. Cynthia Lowry of the Associated Press and John Crosby of the Hartford Courant both noted that the show's premise was very close to that of The Bob Cummings Show of 1955–1959, Lowry finding the similarity "embarassingly reminiscent" of the earlier show while Crosby assessed that the women featured on The Tab Hunter Show were "more stunning" than those on The Bob Cummings Show, but that Tab Hunter lacked Bob Cummings's talent for comedy. Percy Shain of The Boston Globe noted that show plots would be repetitive and predicted that young people would like the show more than older viewers. Jack Gould of The New York Times found the show's plots far-fetched, but thought younger teenagers might enjoy it.

Reviewing "One Blonde Too Many" Variety said the network "may have a winner in this fast-paced charade... Most of the lines and situations were funny, although the plot didn’t bear any close examination. It was enough that the twists and turns went off in breezy fashion and the close of the show came sooner than expected. "

In early November 1960, with The Tab Hunter Show having been on the air for almost two months, critic Steven H. Scheuer wrote that the show had “started off pleasantly enough but has deteriorated into a series of clichés about the bachelor with the roving eye.”
