= Pepe (1960 film) =

1960 film by George Sidney

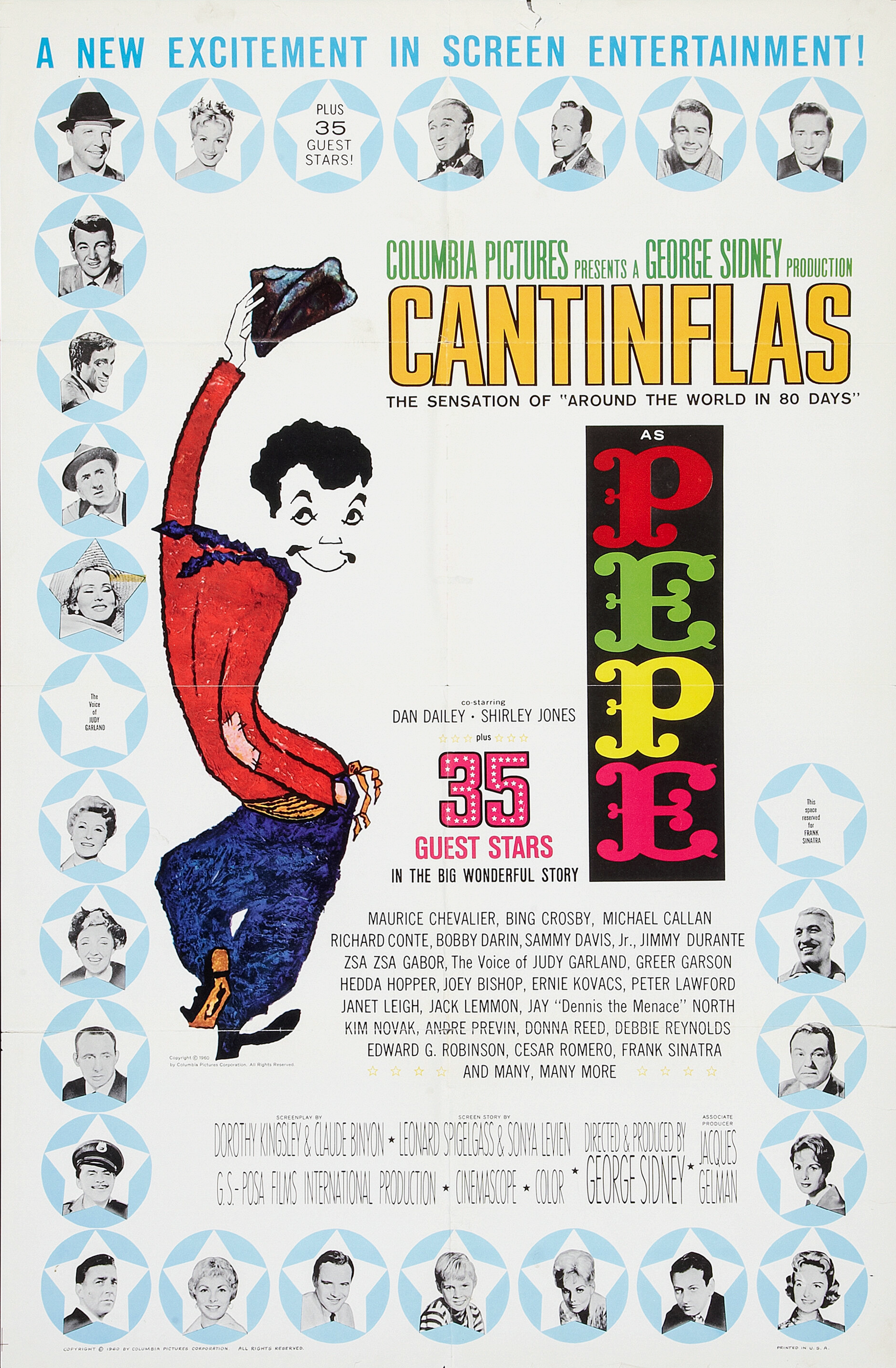
- Release poster
- Directed by: George Sidney
- Written by: Claude Binyon; Dorothy Kingsley
- Story by: Sonya Levien; Leonard Spigelgass
- Based on: Broadway Zauber play by Leslie Bush-Fekete
- Produced by: George Sidney
- Starring: Cantinflas; Dan Dailey; Shirley Jones
- Cinematography: Joseph MacDonald
- Edited by: Viola Lawrence; Al Clark
- Music by: Johnny Green
- Distributed by: Columbia Pictures
- Release date: December 20, 1960
- Running time: 157 minutes
- Country: United States
- Language: English
- Budget: $5 million
- Box office: $4.8 million (US/ Canada rentals)

Pepe is a 1960 American musical comedy film starring Cantinflas in the title role, directed by George Sidney. The film contained a multitude of cameo appearances, attempting to replicate the success of Cantinflas' American debut Around the World in 80 Days.

The film received generally unfavorable reviews from critics and failed to match the box-office success of his previous American film. The movie was issued on VHS tape in 1998; to date, a DVD and a Blu-ray have been released in Spain, but none in the United States.

== Plot ==
Pepe is a hired hand, employed on a ranch. A boozing Hollywood director, Mr. Holt, buys a white stallion that belongs to Pepe's boss. Pepe, determined to get the horse back (as he considers it his family), decides to go to Hollywood. There he meets film stars, including Jimmy Durante, Frank Sinatra, Zsa Zsa Gabór, Bing Crosby, Maurice Chevalier and Jack Lemmon in drag as Daphne from Some Like It Hot. He is also surprised by things that were new in the U.S. at the time, such as automatic doors. When he finally reaches the man who bought the horse, he is led to believe there is no hope of getting it back. However, Mr. Holt offers him a job when he realizes that Pepe brings new life to the stallion. With his luck changing, Pepe wins big money in Las Vegas, enough that Mr. Holt lets him be the producer of his next movie. Most of the movie centers around his meeting Suzie Murphy, an actress on hard times who hates the world. Just like with the stallion, Pepe brings out the best in Suzie and helps her become a big star in a movie made by Mr. Holt. The last scene shows both him and the stallion back at the ranch with several foals.

== Cast ==
- Cantinflas as Pepe
- Dan Dailey as Ted Holt
- Shirley Jones as Suzie Murphy
- Carlos Montalbán as Rodríguez (auctioneer)
- Vicki Trickett as Lupita
- Matt Mattox as Dancer
- Hank Henry as Manager
- Suzanne Lloyd as Carmen
- Carlos Rivas as Carlos
- Michael Callan as Dancer
- William Demarest as Movie Studio Gateman

=== Cameos ===
- Joey Bishop as himself
- Billie Burke
- Maurice Chevalier as himself, performing a number
- Charles Coburn as himself
- Richard Conte as himself
- Bing Crosby as himself
- Tony Curtis as himself
- Bobby Darin as himself, performing a number
- Ann B. Davis as her TV character Schultzy
- Sammy Davis Jr. as himself, performing a number in Las Vegas
- Jimmy Durante as man at casino
- Zsa Zsa Gabór as herself
- Judy Garland (voice only)
- Greer Garson as herself
- Hedda Hopper
- Ernie Kovacs as border official
- Peter Lawford as himself
- Janet Leigh as herself
- Jack Lemmon as himself, wearing his outfit from Some Like It Hot
- Dean Martin
- Jay North as his TV character Dennis the Menace
- Kim Novak as herself
- André Previn
- Donna Reed as herself, talking to Edward G. Robinson
- Debbie Reynolds as herself, dancing with Cantinflas in a dream sequence
- Edward G. Robinson
- Cesar Romero as a man next to a slot machine
- Frank Sinatra as himself

== Production ==
In August 1957, George Sidney Productions announced Leonard Spigelglass was working on the screenplay of a vehicle for Cantinflas called Magic. In November of that year Sidney announced the film was called Pepe.

The film was based on an Austrian musical revue, Broadway Zauber ("Broadway Magic"), whose debut in Vienna in 1935 was reviewed by Variety.

In April 1959, contracts were signed with Columbia to produce and release the film. George Sidney was to direct and co produce, under his own banner, along with Jacques Gelman, head of Posa International films.

George Sidney later recalled "there were problems dealing with the logistics of making a picture in two countries with a writer's strike going on at the same time. It was difficult trying to schedule around this person and that person and getting all of the people together. Shooting in Mexico with two sets of crew down there posed problems. I was moving back and forth and any time I was in one place I needed to be in another place." Sidney says that because of the writers strike, Durante and Cantinflas had to ad lib their scene together. "It turned out to be pretty funny," said Sidney. "The studio thought we had hired writers on the black market."

It was Judy Garland’s first film work since A Star is Born was released in 1954. She was slated to make an onscreen appearance. However, she was still recovering from illness and the producers decided to limit it to a song.

== Reception ==
Bosley Crowther of The New York Times was not impressed. "The rare and wonderful talents of Mexican comedian Cantinflas, who was nicely introduced to the general public as the valet in Around the World in 80 Days, are pitifully spent and dissipated amid a great mass of Hollywooden dross in the oversized, over-peopled Pepe, which opened at the Criterion last night."

Variety said it had a "wealth of entertainment" as well as "dull spots".

Filmink argued Callan danced "superbly in one scene in a West Side Story style number."

== Soundtrack album ==
The soundtrack was issued in 1960 by Colpix Records in the U.S. (CP 507) and Pye International Records in the UK (NPL 28015). The tracks were:

Side One

1. "Pepe" sung by Shirley Jones
2. "Mimi" / September Song sung by Maurice Chevalier
3. "Hooray for Hollywood" sung by Sammy Davis Jr.
4. "The Rumble" (André Previn) – orchestral version

Side Two

1. "That's How It Went, All Right" (Dory Langdon Previn / André Previn) sung by Bobby Darin
2. "The Faraway Part of Town" (Dory Langdon Previn / André Previn) sung by Judy Garland
3. "Suzy's Theme" (Johnny Green) – orchestral version
4. "Pennies from Heaven" / Let's Fall in Love / South of the Border sung by Bing Crosby
5. "Lovely Day" (Agustín Lara / Dory Langdon Previn) sung by Shirley Jones

== Awards and nominations ==
As of 2023, Pepe holds the record for the film with the most Academy Award nominations without being nominated in the Picture, Director, Acting, or Screenplay categories.

Award	Category	Nominee(s)	Result
Academy Awards	Best Art Direction – Color	Art Direction: Ted Haworth; Set Decoration: William Kiernan	Nominated
Academy Awards	Best Cinematography – Color	Joseph MacDonald	Nominated
Academy Awards	Best Costume Design – Color	Edith Head	Nominated
Academy Awards	Best Film Editing	Viola Lawrence and Al Clark	Nominated
Academy Awards	Best Scoring of a Musical Picture	Johnny Green	Nominated
Academy Awards	Best Song	"Faraway Part of Town"; Music by André Previn; Lyrics by Dory Previn	Nominated
Academy Awards	Best Sound	Charles Rice	Nominated
Golden Globe Awards	Best Motion Picture – Musical		Nominated
Golden Globe Awards	Best Actor in a Motion Picture – Musical or Comedy	Cantinflas	Nominated
Golden Globe Awards	Best Original Score – Motion Picture	Johnny Green	Nominated
Laurel Awards	Top Musical		Won
Laurel Awards	Top Male Comedy Performance	Cantinflas	5th Place
Laurel Awards	Top Female Comedy Performance	Janet Leigh	Won
Laurel Awards	Top Musical Score	André Previn	5th Place

== Comic book adaptation ==
- Dell Four Color #1194 (April 1961)
