= Hand of Death (1962 film) =

1962 film by Gene Nelson

- Theatrical release poster
- Directed by: Gene Nelson
- Written by: Eugene Ling
- Produced by: Eugene Ling
- Starring: John Agar; Paula Raymond; Stephen Dunne
- Cinematography: Floyd Crosby
- Edited by: Carl Pierson
- Music by: Sonny Burke
- Color process: Black and white
- Production company: Associated Producers Inc
- Distributed by: 20th Century Fox
- Release date: March 1, 1962 (Limited)
- Running time: 60 minutes
- Country: United States
- Language: English

Hand of Death is a low-budget 1962 American horror film directed by Gene Nelson and written and produced by Eugene Ling. The film stars John Agar, Paula Raymond, Stephen Dunne, and Joe Besser and Butch Patrick in cameos. The film was made in black and white CinemaScope. The narrative follows a scientist who develops a military nerve gas. After accidentally exposing himself to it, he not only turns into a grotesque monster, but anyone who touches him dies.

It was Nelson's directorial debut and the last film produced by Ling. The film was released in March 1962. It played theatrically on a double feature with Cabinet of Caligari (1962).

== Plot ==
Scientist Alex Marsh has invented a powerful paralytic-hypnotic nerve gas for the military that he has been testing on sheep in the Mojave Desert. The local mailman blunders into the test site and is overcome but recovers without ill effect. A confident Alex rushes to the home of Dr. Frederick Ramsey, his mentor, to tell him about it. Alex's girlfriend Carol Wilson and his colleague Tom Holland are also there. Alex designed the gas as a way to eliminate casualties at war by placing those exposed to it in a trance-like state for a certain amount of time, at which time the exposed are compliant to any commands given to them. Although Carol feels the project is both dangerous and immoral, Alex continues his testing, vowing not to stop until he has found a way to eliminate the loss of life in war.

While working in the lab, Alex accidentally spills a liquefied version of the nerve gas and, in haste to clean it up, accidentally gets some of it on his hands. The next day, Alex awakens to discover his extremities have darkened, and have become irritating and painful. When his assistant Carlos touches him, Carlos withers away and dies. Panicking, Alex sets the lab afire to cover Carlos's death and heads to Ramsey's. When Alex stops as a gas station, the attendant dies after touching him, causing Alex to flee in horror.

Arriving at Ramsey's house, Alex begs him to find an antidote, which Ramsey eventually agrees to do with the help of Tom. After the first attempted cure has no effect, a desperate Alex consumes the vial of serum Ramsey was working on. Instead of curing his condition like Alex had hoped, the serum mutates him further, bloating and darkening his body until he is unrecognizable. Horrified by his monstrous appearance, Alex accidentally kills Ramsey and flees. Attempting to cover his now deformed features with a trench coat and a fedora, Alex tries to hail a cab but the driver is unable to understand his muffled speech, and when the cabbie tries to get Alex out of the cab he is killed after touching him and Alex flees in the cab. He later falls asleep on the beach in a deserted area where a small boy playing on the rocks almost discovers him accidentally.

Alex later abandons the cab and stumbles toward Tom's house, where Carol is staying. Breaking into the house Alex attempts to speak to a terrified Carol, but can only scrawl a note in shaky handwriting that simply reads "TOM SERUM HELP."

The police soon arrive and Alex flees to the beach, where he is surrounded by the armed police. Although Carol pleas for Alex to surrender, the mutated scientist whose mind has become warped lunges towards them and is promptly gunned down in the surf.

== Cast ==
- John Agar as Alex Marsh
- Paula Raymond as Carol Wilson
- Stephen Dunne as Tom Holland (as Steve Dunne)
- Roy Gordon as Dr. Frederick Ramsey
- John A. Alonzo as Carlos, lab assistant (as John Alonzo)
- Jack Younger as Mike The Mailman
- Joe Besser as Service station Attendant
- Butch Patrick as Davey, little boy on beach
- Norman Burton as Chief Homicide Investigator
- Fred Krone as Cab Driver
- Kevin Enright as Police Photographer
- Jack Donner as Cop (as Jack Doner)
- Chuck Niles as Reporter
- Ruth Terry as Woman with Packages
- Bob Whitney as Cop

== Production ==
Screenplay writer Harry Spalding said that 20th Century Fox initially refused the project but passed it on to Robert L. Lippert's Associated Productions, which had made low budget movies for them previously. Ling was assigned to write the script for Hand of Death because Maury Dexter, a producer/director himself, said that Lippert "owed him a favor." According to Dexter, they could not find an experienced director for the film because the script was so bad. Nelson had acted in the past and was keen to direct, so Lippert gave him the job. Shooting took seven days.

Filming took place in Malibu and Santa Monica. Raymond said in an interview that "shortly after completing" Hand of Death, she had a serious car crash which severed her nose and resulted in multiple plastic surgeries. At the time of interview, she said she had never seen the film.

The working titles of Hand of Death were Five Fingers of Death and The Death Walker. The film was shot in black-and-white CinemaScope with a widescreen aspect ratio of 2.35:1.

Theatrical posters for the film were headlined "He Experimented in HORROR!", "No One Dared Come Too Close" and "DOOM Was Always In His GRASP!"

== Release ==
Hand of Death was released in the US in March 1962. It played theatrically on a double bill with The Cabinet of Caligari (1962). The latter film is described as "not so much a remake" of the famous 1920 German Expressionist film The Cabinet of Dr. Caligari, but as one "inspired" by it.

Hand of Death was granted an X certification by the British Board of Film Censors on 5 March 1962. The X-cert prevented it from legally being shown in theatres to audience members under age 16.

According to BoxOffice magazine's "Boxoffice Barometer," the film opened simultaneously in Denver; Detroit; Kansas City; New Haven CT; and Omaha NE. The "Barometer" shows how financially well new releases are performing during their first week, with a score of 100 indicating "normal" gross box office receipts. Hand of Death averaged an 85 with scores in the same order as the five cities listed above of 65, 70, 100, 90 and 100, By comparison, the most popular film of the same week, The Music Man, had an average score of 273.

Critic Bryan Senn writes that Hand of Death was part of Fox's TV movie package during the 1960s and early 1970s, but "the company's distribution rights expired in the early 1980s, causing the feature to fall into legal limbo. Consequently, the movie languished unseen for over two decades," resurfacing sometime after the year 2000. As such, it was generally regarded as a lost film. Film historian Bill Warren, however, says that Agar brought a previously unknown VHS copy of the film to his birthday party "a year or so" before his death in 2002.

Hand of Death was shown on FXM on 6, 15, 16, 20 and 21 September 2020.

=== Home media ===
The film was released for the first time on DVD by Willette Acquisition Corp. on March 17, 2015.

== Reception ==
Hand of Death received mostly negative reviews upon its release. BoxOffice magazine, in a review in its issue of March 19, 1962, called it "program filler from the word go" and which will cause the more "discriminating" audience members to "squirm with disgust." As for acting, though, the anonymous reviewer says that Agar is "appropriately grim-faced" and "Miss Raymond is a proper feminine foil and the supporting actors are good." Warren notes that the film "begins reasonably well (...) but when the plot becomes clear, with Agar simply killing a bunch of people before he himself is shot, most audiences lost interest. They'd seen it before, and the early promise was betrayed." Similarly, Bruce Elder at AllMovie points out that by the time it was released, "this kind of movie was rapidly losing its traditional audience, as earlier examples from the genre (...) began showing up regularly on television." TV Guide was also critical of the film, giving it one out of four stars.

== Legacy ==
Agar's makeup has gotten some degree of attention over the years. In an interview, Agar said that his son, age 2 or 3 at the time, "came onto the set with his mother and heard his dad's voice coming out of this monster get-up - it scared him half to death! I had a tough time explaining it to him." Raymond recalled it as "grotesque" but "outstanding and frightening to look at." But while Warren comments that makeup artist Bob Mark used "some admirable imagination" in creating the Alex-monster, he also writes that "having [Alex] turn black was a terrible blunder" for the studio because it resulted in the monster looking like "the grossest possible caricature of a black man." Senn agrees, writing that "Though it's doubtful filmmakers intended to send a racial message, this seemingly insensitive device speaks volumes about the way many whites viewed African American men in the early 1960s." The monster in the film also closely resembles the character of Ben Grimm (aka The Thing) from the best selling Marvel Comics magazine The Fantastic Four, right down to the hat and trenchcoat the character used to hide himself from the public in the comic book stories. The comic book series premiered in September 1961, and may well have served as the template for Agar's makeup in the film.
