= Carnival of Souls =

1962 film by Herk Harvey

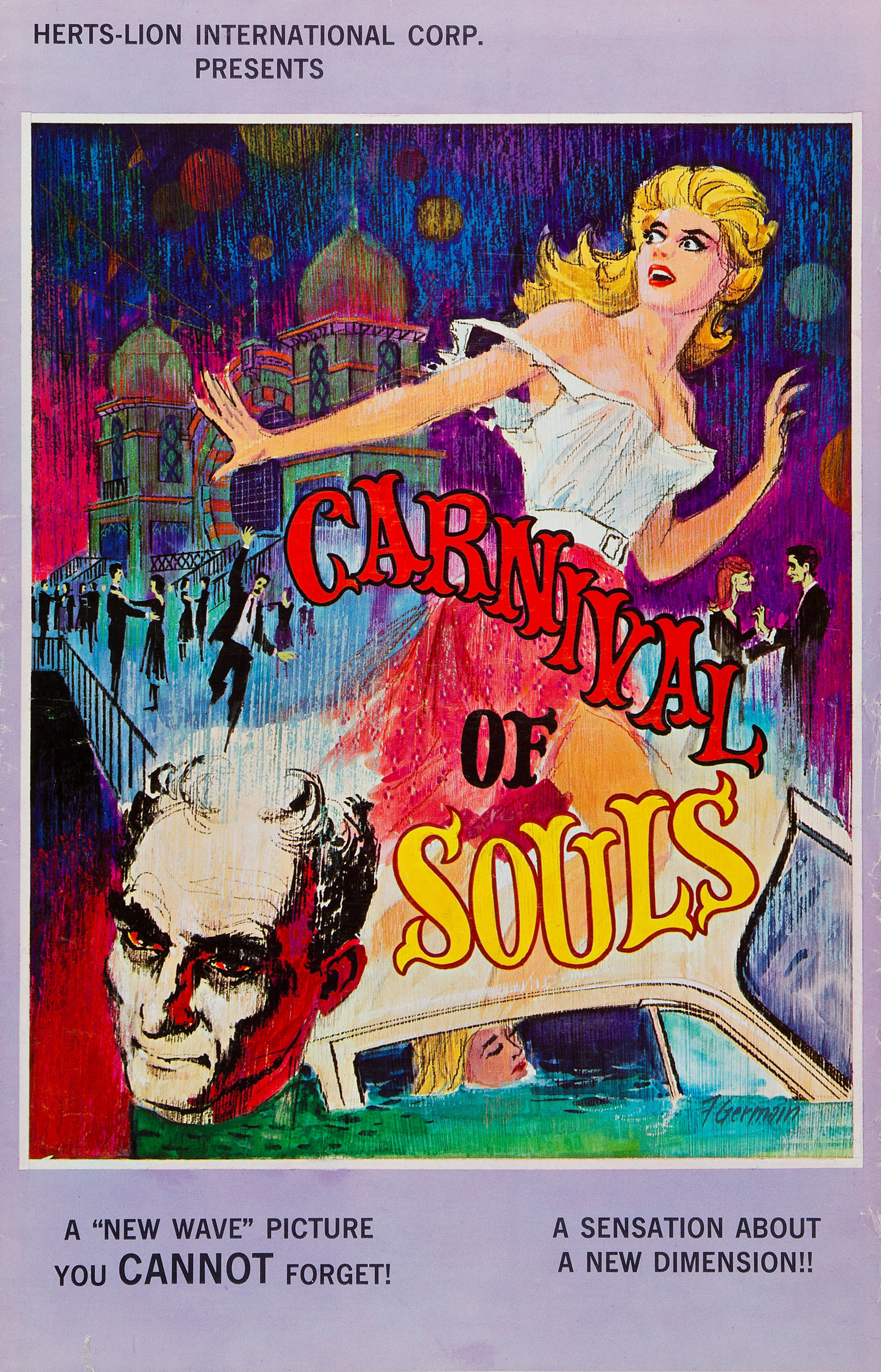
- US film poster by F. Germain
- Directed by: Herk Harvey
- Written by: John Clifford
- Produced by: Herk Harvey
- Starring: Candace Hilligoss; Sidney Berger
- Cinematography: Maurice Prather
- Edited by: Dan Palmquist; Bill de Jarnette
- Music by: Gene Moore
- Production company: Harcourt Productions
- Distributed by: Herts-Lion International Corp.
- Release date: September 26, 1962
- Running time: 80 minutes
- Country: United States
- Language: English
- Budget: $33,000

Carnival of Souls is a 1962 American neo-noir psychological horror film produced and directed by Herk Harvey. The screenplay was written by John Clifford, and the film stars Candace Hilligoss. Its plot follows Mary Henry, a young woman whose life is disturbed after a car accident. She relocates to a new city, where she finds herself unable to assimilate with the locals, and becomes drawn to the pavilion of an abandoned carnival. Harvey appears in the film as a ghoulish stranger who stalks her throughout.

Filmed in Douglas County, Kansas, and Salt Lake City, Carnival of Souls was shot on a budget of $33,000, and Harvey employed various guerrilla filmmaking techniques. The film is loosely based on the French short An Occurrence at Owl Creek Bridge (1961), itself an adaptation of the 1890 short story of the same name by Ambrose Bierce, and Harvey was inspired by the visual style of filmmakers such as Ingmar Bergman and Jean Cocteau. Carnival of Souls was Harvey's only feature film, and did not gain widespread attention when originally released as a double feature with The Devil's Messenger in 1962.

Since the 1980s, the film has been noted by critics and film scholars for its cinematography and foreboding atmosphere. The film has a large cult following and is occasionally screened at film and Halloween festivals.

== Plot ==
Carnival of Souls (1962) by Herk Harvey

In Kansas, Mary Henry is riding in a car with two other women when two men challenge them to a road race. During the race, the women's car is nudged by the men's car and plunges off a bridge into a muddy river. Three hours after the police start dredging the water to look for them, Mary miraculously surfaces on the river bank, but cannot remember how she survived.

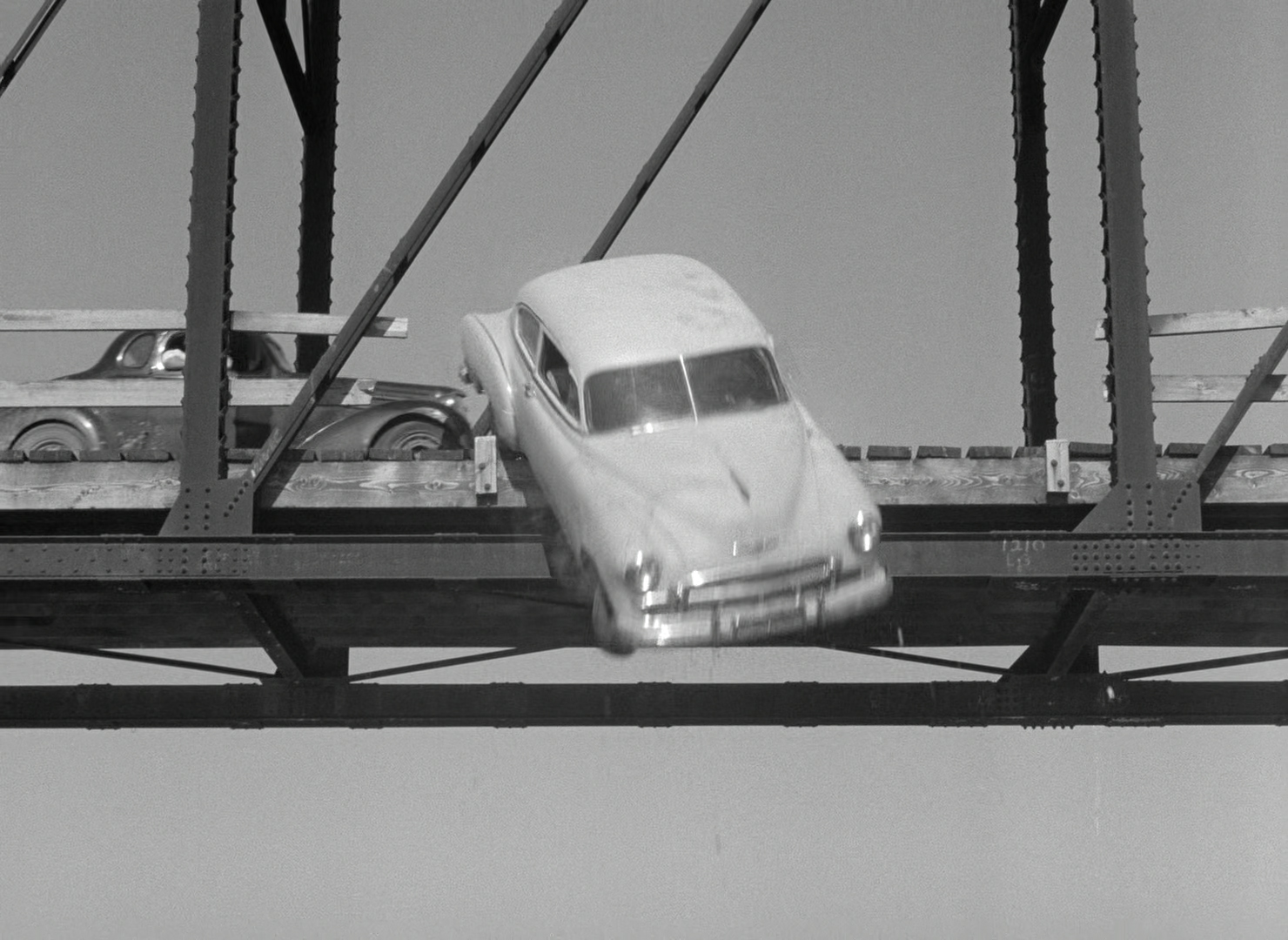
Still frame of the car falling off the bridge.

Mary decides to leave Kansas for good and moves to Salt Lake City, where she has been hired as a church organist. While driving near an abandoned pavilion on the shores of the Great Salt Lake, Mary begins experiencing visions of a ghoulish, pale-faced figure ("The Man"). A gas station attendant tells her the pavilion was first a bathhouse, then a dance hall, and finally a carnival before it was abandoned. In town, Mary rents a room and visits the church where she will be playing the organ. Mary takes a ride out to the pavilion with the church's minister, who stops her from entering.

Mary continues experiencing visions of The Man. She rejects the advances of John, a socially awkward neighboring lodger. Mary goes to the pavilion by herself to investigate but does not find anything. Meanwhile, she begins experiencing terrifying interludes when she becomes invisible and inaudible to the rest of the world. During one of these episodes, Mary meets Dr. Samuels, who offers to help her while acknowledging he is not a psychiatrist. Mary returns to the church by herself to practice the organ and finds herself shifting from a hymn to eerie music. In a trance, she sees visions of The Man and ghouls dancing at the pavilion. Upon hearing this strange music, the minister denounces it as sacrilege and insists that Mary resign.

That night, Mary accompanies John to a bar. Terrified of being alone with her nightmares, Mary tells John she wants his company, although he has little sympathy for her obvious distress. When they return home, John tries to convince Mary to let him stay the night; however, Mary then sees The Man in the mirror and has a nervous breakdown. The following morning, after moving out of the boarding house, she gets the transmission on her car checked; while doing so, she believes she sees The Man and runs away in a fright, abandoning her car. She frantically runs to a bus station and then Salt Lake City Union Pacific Depot in order to leave the city, but the locals do not acknowledge her and she only encounters more ghouls. Upon visiting Dr. Samuels once again, and seeing he is also a ghoul, she wakes up in her car.

She drives back to the pavilion, where she finds the ghouls dancing, with a ghoul version of herself paired with The Man. She tries to run away, but is chased by the ghouls onto the beach, where she collapses as they close in. The following day, Dr. Samuels, the minister, and the police go to the pavilion to look for Mary. They find her footprints but note that she has otherwise vanished. Back in Kansas, the submerged car is finally pulled from the river. Mary's body is seen in the front seat alongside the other two women.

== Cast ==
- Candace Hilligoss as Mary Henry
- Frances Feist as Mrs. Thomas
- Sidney Berger as John Linden
- Art Ellison as Minister
- Stan Levitt as Dr. Samuels
- Tom McGinnis as Organ factory boss
- Forbes Caldwell as Organ factory worker
- Dan Palmquist as Gas station attendant
- Bill De Jarnette as Mechanic
- Steve Boozer as Chip
- Pamela Ballard as Dress saleslady
- Herk Harvey as "The Man"

== Production ==
=== Development ===
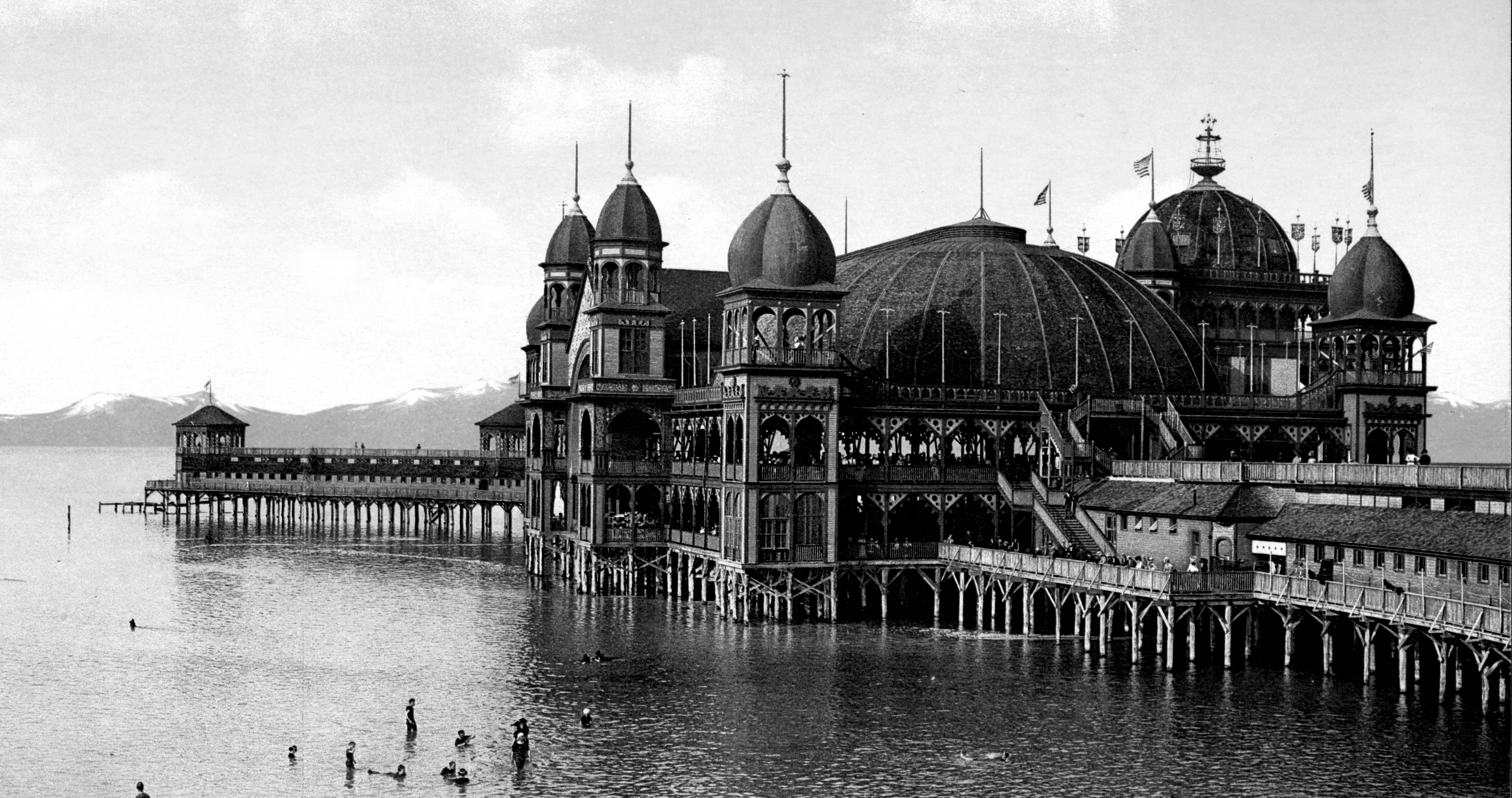
Harvey shot the film in and around the abandoned Saltair Pavilion in Salt Lake City, Utah

Harold Arnold "Herk" Harvey was a director and producer of industrial and educational films at the Centron Corporation of Lawrence, Kansas. While returning to Kansas after shooting a Centron film in California, Harvey developed the idea for Carnival of Souls after driving past the abandoned Saltair Pavilion in Salt Lake City. "When I got back to Lawrence, I asked my friend and co-worker at Centron Films, John Clifford, who was a writer there, how he'd like to write a feature," Harvey recalled. "The last scene, I told him, had to be a whole bunch of ghouls dancing in that ballroom; the rest was up to him. He wrote it in three weeks." The screenplay is loosely based on the French short film An Occurrence at Owl Creek Bridge (1961), itself an adaptation of the 1890 short story of the same name by Ambrose Bierce.

=== Casting ===
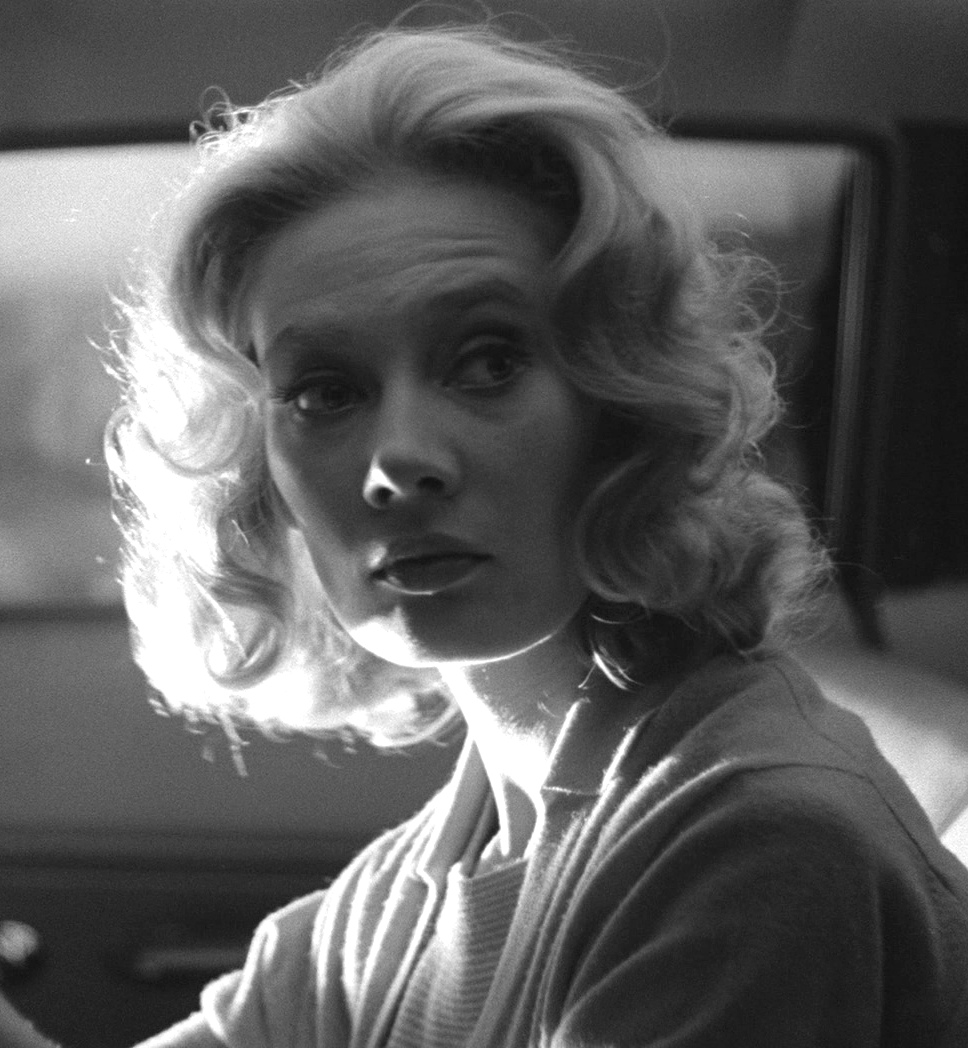
Candace Hilligoss, 1962

In New York City, Harvey discovered twenty-six-year-old actress Candace Hilligoss, who had trained with Lee Strasberg, and cast her in the lead role of Mary Henry. Hilligoss had been offered a role in the Richard Hilliard–directed horror film Violent Midnight (1963), but opted for the role in Carnival of Souls. She stated that at the time, she took the role as a "take-the-money-and-run type of situation"; she was paid approximately $2,000 for her work in the film.

=== Filming ===
Harvey shot Carnival of Souls in three weeks on location in Lawrence and Salt Lake City, after taking three weeks off from his job at Centron, and starting with an initial production budget of $17,000. He raised the $17,000 cash budget by asking local businessmen if they were willing to invest $500 in his production. The other $13,000 of the total $30,000 budget was deferred. Harvey was able to secure the rental of the Saltair Pavilion for $50, and several other scenes, such as the scene featuring Mary in the department store, were shot guerrilla style, with Harvey paying off locals to allow the crew to quickly film. Hilligoss described the filming process as brisk, with the cast and crew working seven days a week.

Harvey aimed for the film to have "the look of Bergman and the feel of Cocteau," and employed techniques he had learned in his work on industrial films in order to limit production costs. There was not enough money for a process screen for rear projection shots, which was the method typically used at that time to create the impression that a scene was taking place inside a moving car. Instead, Harvey used a battery-powered Arriflex handheld camera to film inside moving cars. The Arriflex, which was at that time more often used for newsreel footage, also allowed them to use a moving camera in other scenes without the need for dollies or cranes.

Harvey's assistant director was Reza Badiyi, a young Iranian immigrant. At this time, Badiyi had been second-unit director on one other film, Robert Altman's The Delinquents, but would go on to make (amongst other notable work) some of the best-known, iconic television series openings and montages, including Hawaii Five-O, Get Smart, and The Mary Tyler Moore Show. The shot in which the face of The Man appears in the car window was accomplished through the use of an angled mirror placed on the far side of the window. The scene at the start of the film in which the car goes off the bridge and into the river was filmed in Lecompton, Kansas. The town did not charge a fee for the use of the bridge, only requiring the film crew to replace the bridge's damaged rails once they were done filming. This was done, at a cost of $12 for the repair.

=== Musical score ===
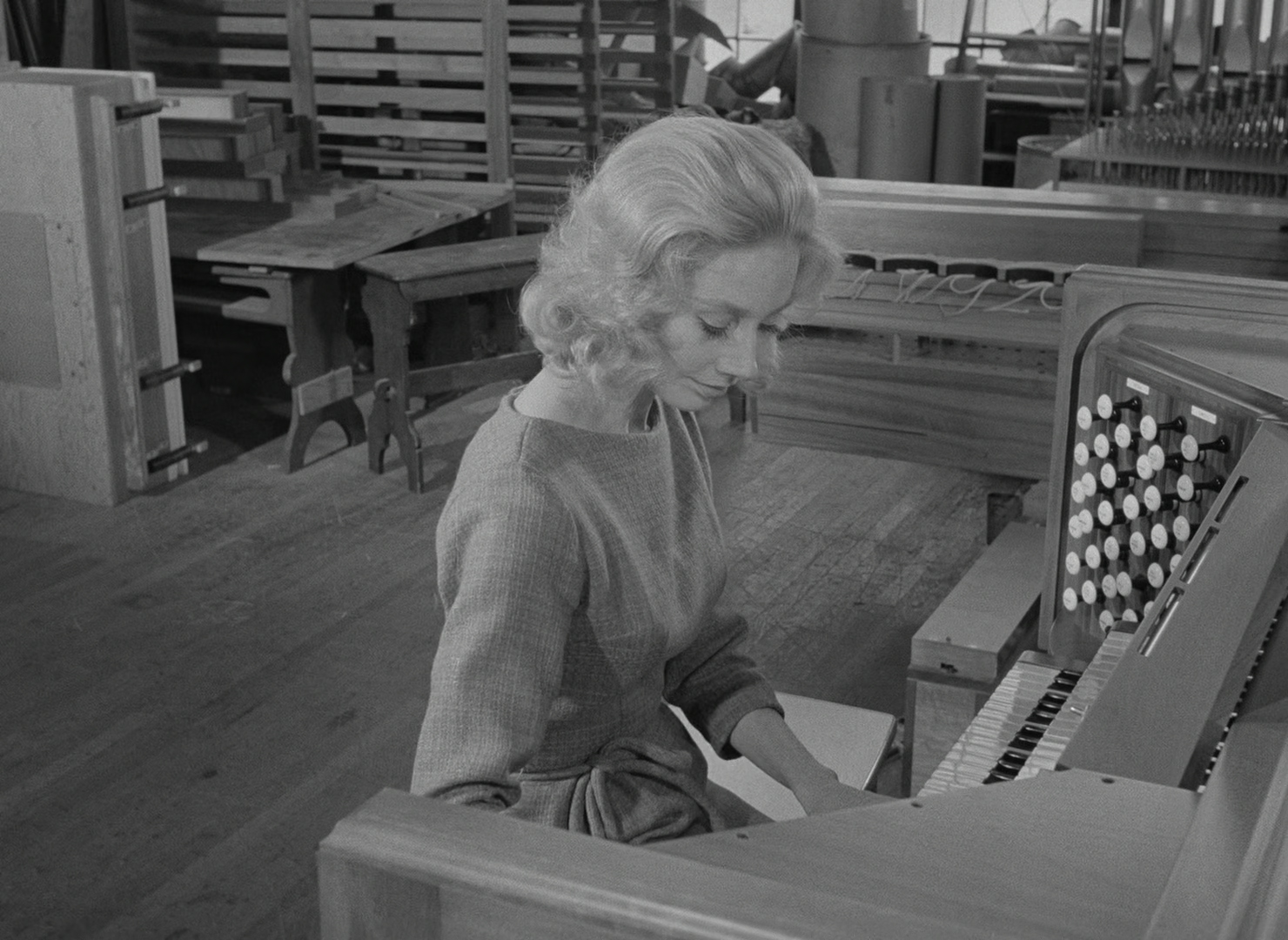
Hilligoss (as Mary Henry) playing organ.

Carnival of Souls features an original organ score by organist and composer Gene Moore. Film and music scholar Julie Brown comments on the score, noting: "The organ is one of the spectral presences in Carnival of Souls, summoning, or being summoned by, the various allusions in the film to cinema's past." Screenwriter John Clifford has stated that the locations Harvey chose for the film (particularly the Saltair Pavilion, and the grand church organ) influenced the decision to use an organ score. The onscreen depiction of the organ played by Mary was implemented by Harvey to add to the film's "Gothic look."

An original soundtrack album for Carnival of Souls was released in 1988. In 2023, Waxwork Records licensed the soundtrack rights from Peter Soby and Matthew Irvine and released Carnival of Souls as part of the Rob Zombie Presents soundtrack series. It was pressed on colored vinyl and housed in special packaging featuring artwork by Graham Humphreys.

== Release ==
Carnival of Souls had its world premiere at the Granada Theatre in Lawrence, Kansas, on September 26, 1962.

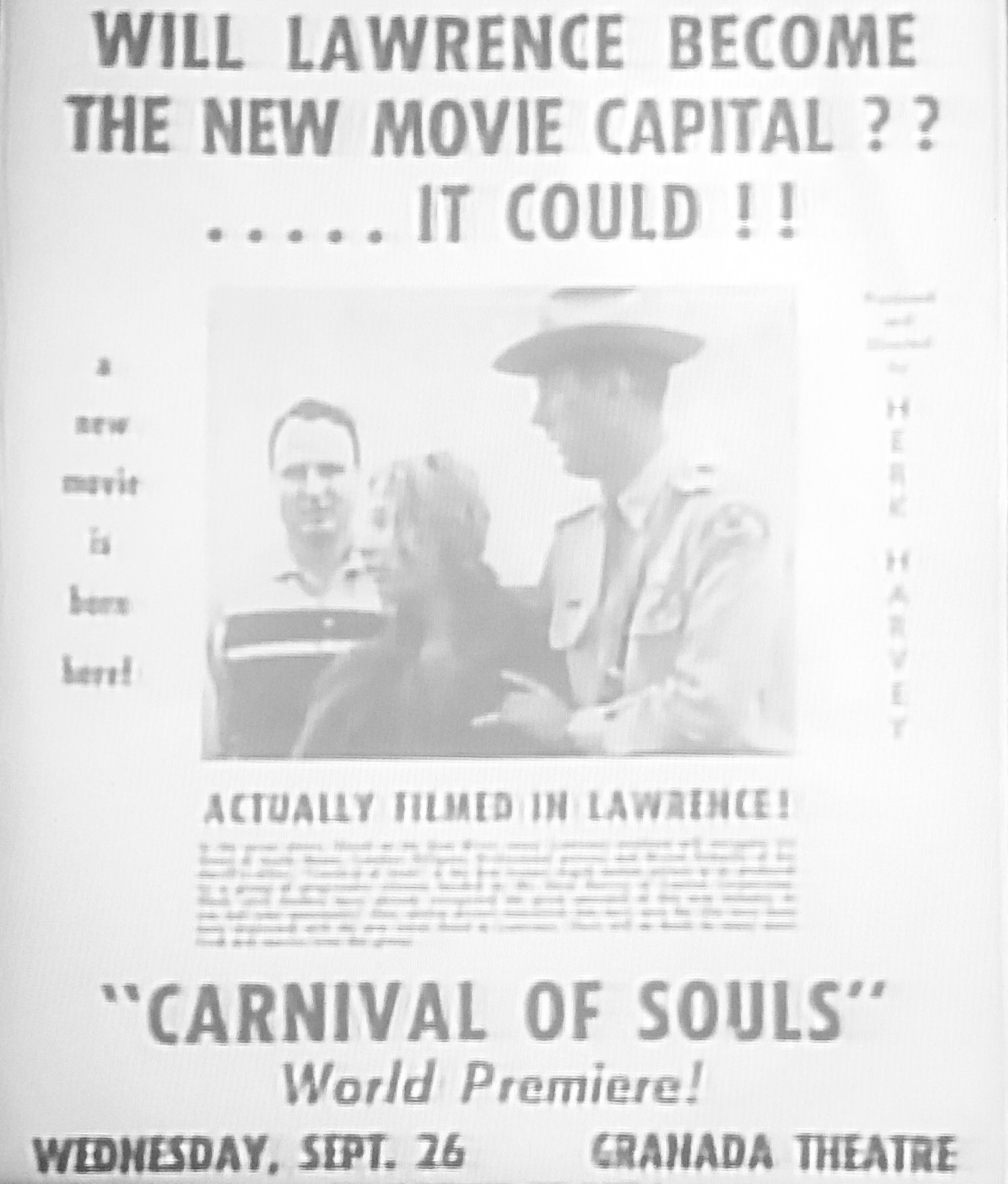
Carnival of Souls film premiere poster

While the US release of Carnival of Souls failed to include a copyright on the prints, automatically placing them in the public domain, the foreign release marketed by Walter Manley did contain a copyright card and was protected for overseas sales. The 35 mm theatrical prints were cut by Herz-Lion to 78 minutes, which trimmed the camera original. However, the 16 mm television copies were printed complete and individually cut by each station to fit their time slot, which is why they vary in length.

WOR-TV in New York City used to broadcast the film intact in a late-night time slot in the 1960s. The scenes cut by the theatrical distributor include a scene where Mary stops at a gas station and discusses the carnival building with the attendant, a longer dialogue sequence between the organ factory boss and a carpenter, and an extra scene where the doctor talks to the landlady. In 1989, the film was screened at festivals across Europe and the United States, affording it renewed public interest, and it has subsequently appeared at numerous Halloween film festivals.

Prints of Carnival of Souls vary in length, from 78 minutes in the theatrical release to 84 minutes in the original cut. While some sources have erroneously listed the film at a 91-minute-runtime, Michael Weldon stated in The Psychotronic Video Guide to Film that the original theatrical cut of the film ran approximately 80 minutes. He also stated that the 84-minute director's cut was "the best and most complete version we'll ever see."

=== Reception and legacy ===
Carnival of Souls went largely unnoticed by critics upon its initial release and received "delayed acclaim" in the ensuing decades, with numerous arthouse screenings in 1989 in conjunction with the Halloween season. It has since become regarded by many film schools as a classic, often praised for its lighting and sound design, in which "sight and sound come together... in a horrifying way." Some scholars, such as S. S. Prawer, consider Carnival of Souls more an art film than a straightforward horror film. The Time Out film guide commended the film's "striking black-and-white compositions, disorienting dream sequences and eerie atmosphere," adding that the film "has the feel of a silent German expressionist movie. Unfortunately, so does some of the acting, which suffers from exaggerated facial expressions and bizarre gesturing. But the mesmerising power of the carnival and dance-hall sequences far outweighs the corniness of the awkward intimate scenes."

Leonard Maltin gave Carnival of Souls a score of two-and-a-half out of four stars, calling the film an "eerie" and "imaginative low budget effort." Critic Roger Ebert likened the film to a "lost episode of The Twilight Zone," and noted that it possessed an "intriguing power." Joe Brown of The Washington Post remarked upon the film's cinematography, writing: "Harvey's camerawork gives a new twist to the word 'deadpan,' making the most mundane places and people imaginable seem like ghastly hallucinations, and the director shows a flair for elegantly employing existing locations and lighting for maximum disorientation value." Stephen Holden of The New York Times saw the 1989 screening at the Fantasy Festival and wrote: "What has earned Carnival of Souls its reputation is the director's knack for building a mood of fatalistic angst." The Los Angeles Times' Peter Rainer perceived the film's cinematography to be inconsistent in merit, called the acting "fairly amateurish" with "a one-take-only quality", and noted the "inept post-dubbing"; however, he concluded that "these rinky-dink elements only add to the horror."

TV Guide gave Carnival of Souls a score of three stars out of four, praising the film's atmosphere, acting, and eerie score, calling it, "A chilling ghost story with artistic pretensions." Film Reel.com gave Carnival of Souls a positive review, praising the film's atmosphere, slow-building tension, and disturbing visuals.

On Rotten Tomatoes, the film has an approval rating of 87% based on 67 reviews, with a rating average of 7.2/10. The site's consensus states that the film "offers delightfully chilling proof that when it comes to telling an effective horror story, less can often be much, much more".

Carnival of Souls has gradually developed a cult following since its release and is now considered a low-budget classic. The film has since been included on multiple lists by various media outlets as one of the greatest horror films ever made. Complex magazine ranked Carnival of Souls number 39 on its list of the 50 scariest movies ever made. Slant Magazine placed the film at number 32 on its "100 Best Horror Movies of All Time". Paste magazine ranked the film at number 85 on its list of "100 Best Horror Movies of All Time".

=== Rights ===
Carnival of Souls is in the public domain in the United States because it lacked a valid copyright notice. In 1997, the original negative and a handful of surviving prints and outtakes were purchased from the filmmakers, along with supposed film rights, by Peter Soby and Matthew Irvine of Chicago West Entertainment, who created a new Director's Cut to copyright the next year. However, later Blu-Ray releases would only contain the theatrical cut despite The Criterion Collection's insistence that the film as a whole is protected under copyright.

=== Home media ===
Carnival of Souls has been released in a significant number of formats through numerous distributors, which, according to film scholars Chris Vander Kaay and Kathleen Fernandez-Vander Kaay, has ensured it "a constant presence in the video market and [contributed to] its enduring cult popularity." The Criterion Collection licensed a remastered version of the film from Peter Soby and Matthew Irvine and issued a 2-disc DVD set of the film in 2000, featuring both a 78-minute theatrical version and an extended 84-minute director's cut. In 2009, Legend Films released the film on DVD featuring both the black-and-white and a colorized version of the directors cut, including an audio commentary track by comedian Michael J. Nelson, a former writer and host of Mystery Science Theater 3000. In 2016, the Criterion Collection reissued the film on DVD, as well as premiering it on Blu-ray, featuring a new restoration.

In 2012, the Academy Film Archive restored Carnival of Souls alongside Peter Soby and Matthew Irvine. They also keep the original negatives stored in their facilities. The film has been named as a precursor to the works of various filmmakers, including David Lynch, George A. Romero, Lucrecia Martel and James Wan.

The film was used for a RiffTrax Live event in October 2016, where former Mystery Science Theater 3000 cast members Bill Corbett, Kevin Murphy and Michael J. Nelson commented on film for a live audience through NCM Fathom. Rifftrax's website offers the video downloads of the live performance as well as a studio-recorded "riff" of the film.

A novelization of the film titled Nightmare Pavilion, written by Andrew J. Rausch, was released by Happy Cloud Media in October 2020.

=== Carnival of Souls (1998) ===
Producer Peter Soby negotiated the rights to the title from Herk Harvey and John Clifford, resulting in the loose 1998 remake of Carnival of Souls (also known as Wes Craven Presents Carnival of Souls). Sidney Berger, who appears in the original film as John Linden, appears in a cameo in the later film. Candace Hilligoss was also asked to participate, but she declined after producers rejected her proposed screenplay for the film.

== See also ==
- List of American films of 1962
- List of cult films
- List of ghost films
- List of films in the public domain in the United States

== Sources ==
- Brown, Julie (2009). "Carnival of Souls and The Organs of Horror". In Lerner, Neil (ed.). Music in the Horror Film: Listening to Fear. New York: Routledge. ISBN 978-1-135-28044-4.
- Crouse, Richard (2003). The 100 Best Movies You've Never Seen. Toronto: ECW Press. ISBN 978-1-55022-590-7.
- Godfrey, Will; Good, Jill; Goodall, Mark, eds. (2009). Crash Cinema: Representation in Film. Cambridge, England: Cambridge Scholars Publishing. ISBN 978-1-443-81518-5.
- Hawkins, Joan (2000). Cutting Edge: Art-Horror and the Horrific Avant-Garde. Minneapolis: University of Minnesota Press. ISBN 978-1-4529-0430-6.
- Hillegass, Jeff (1996). "Carnival of Souls". In Svehla, Gary (ed.). Cinematic Hauntings. Baltimore: Midnight Marquee Press. ISBN 978-1-936168-11-8.
- Hilligoss, Candace (2016). The Odyssey and The Idiocy, Marriage to an Actor, A Memoir. Sarasota: First Edition Design Publishing. ISBN 978-1-5069-0334-7.
- Maltin, Leonard, ed. (2014). Leonard Maltin's 2014 Movie Guide (1st ed.). New York: Penguin Group. ISBN 978-0-451-41810-4.
- Olson, Christopher J. (2018). 100 Greatest Cult Films. Lanham, Maryland: Rowman & Littlefield. ISBN 978-1-442-21104-9.
- Vander Kaay, Chris; Fernandez-Vander Kaay, Christine, eds. (2016). Horror Films by Subgenre: A Viewer's Guide. Jefferson, North Carolina: McFarland. ISBN 978-0-786-49837-6.
- Weaver, Tom (2003). Double Feature Creature Attack: A Monster Merger of Two More Volumes of Classic Interviews. Jefferson, NC: McFarland. ISBN 978-0-7864-8215-3.
- Weaver, Tom (2011). I Was a Monster Movie Maker: Conversations with 22 SF and Horror Filmmakers. Jefferson, NC: McFarland. ISBN 978-0-7864-6265-0.
- Weldon, Michael (1996). The Psychotronic Video Guide To Film. New York City: Macmillan. ISBN 978-0-312-13149-4.
