= Vicki Trickett =

American actress (1938–2021)

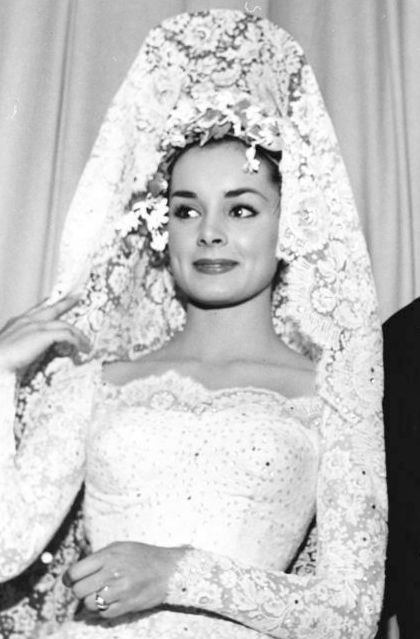
- Trickett in 1961
- Born: Vicki K. Trickett; September 2, 1938; Kansas City, Kansas, U.S.
- Died: August 30, 2021 (aged 82); San Juan Capistrano, California, U.S.
- Occupation: Actress
- Years active: 1960–1962
- Spouses: Richard V. Herre Jr. (m. 1960–1963) Donald E. Kennedy (m. 1963–1970) James G. Lindblad (m. 1972–2016)
- Awards: Laurel Award, Top Female New Personality 1962

Vicki Trickett (September 2, 1938 – August 30, 2021) was an American actress best known for several film roles in the early 1960s. She is probably best known for her role as Diane Quigley in the film The Three Stooges Meet Hercules (1962).

== Early life and career ==
Born in Kansas City, Kansas, Trickett was the eldest of five children and daughter of professional golfer, L.G. Trickett. Before entering the entertainment business, Trickett attended Omaha University (now the University of Nebraska at Omaha) for a year, majoring in Chemistry and Spanish. At OU she was named Miss Auto Show of 1959 and was third runner up in the Tomahawk Beauty Queen Pageant 1959. In 1959, she competed in the Miss Universe contest as "Miss Omaha."

Tab Hunter discovered her in 1959 after meeting her at a Del Mar horse show. Hunter cast her in two episodes of The Tab Hunter Show . This led to additional television appearances on The Adventures of Ozzie & Harriet. Other film work included The Cabinet of Caligari, Gidget Goes Hawaiian and Pepe.

Following the divorce from her first husband, Trickett left the entertainment industry and returned to live in Omaha, Nebraska.

== Awards ==
Trickett was nominated for a Laurel Award for Top Female New Personality in 1962.

== Personal life and death ==
Trickett married three times. Her first marriage was to Richard V. Herre Jr. in 1960; the two had one child before divorcing in 1963. Her second marriage was to Donald E. Kennedy in 1963, which also ended in divorce. Trickett married her third husband, James G. Lindblad in August 1972.

Trickett died aged 82 in San Juan Capistrano, California.

== Filmography ==
Films & TV
Year	Title	Role	Note
1962	The Adventures of Ozzie and Harriet	Gloria	Episode: Rick, the Host
1962	The Cabinet of Caligari	Jeanie the Maid	
1962	The Three Stooges Meet Hercules	Diane Quigley	Leading
1961	Gidget Goes Hawaiian	Abby Stewart	Supporting
1961	The Tab Hunter Show	Claire Duval / Laurie McBain	Episodes: Personal Appearance, Portia Go Home
1960	Pepe	Lupita	Supporting
