= Art Ellison =

American actor and director

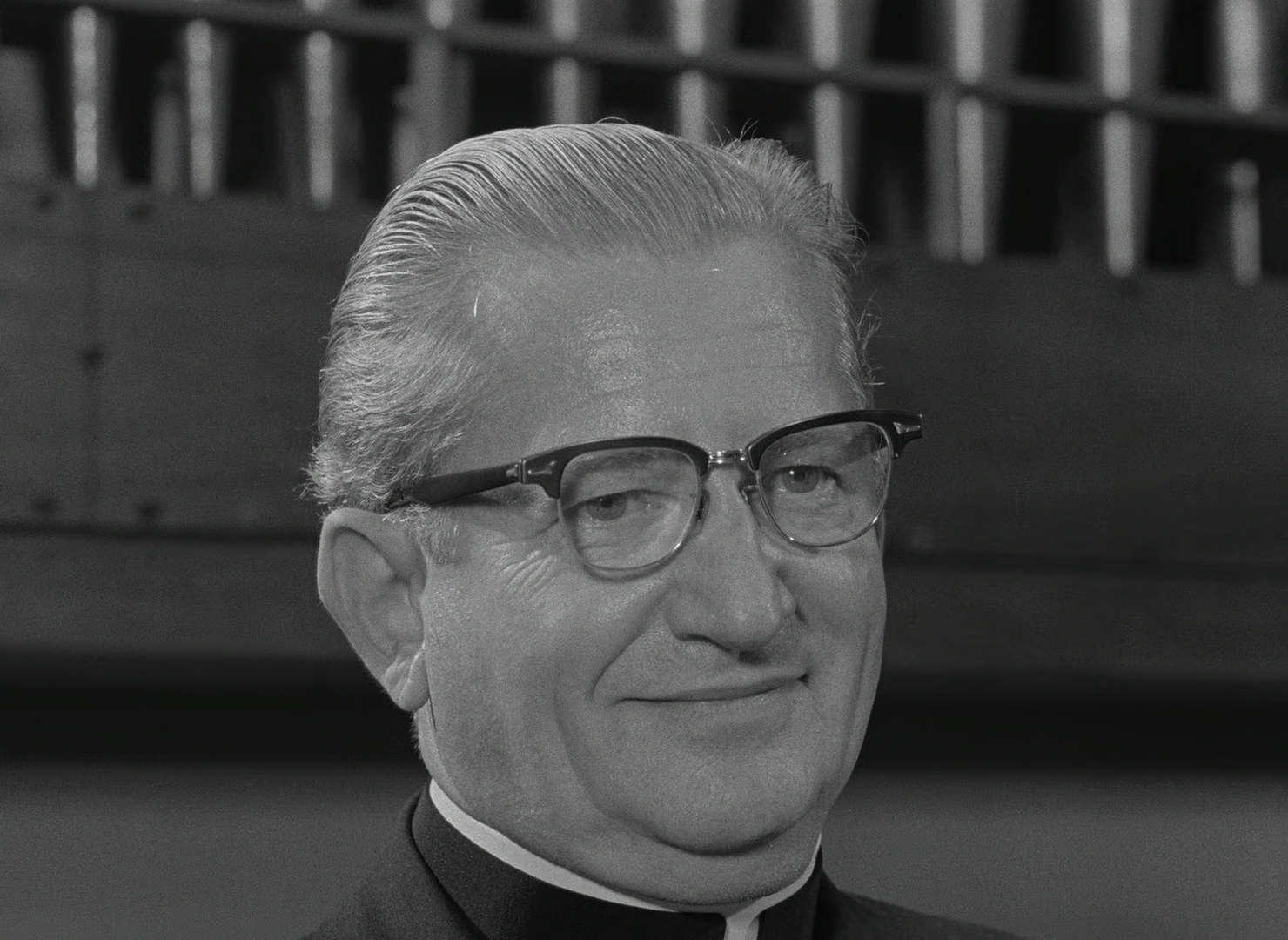
Art Ellison in Carnival of Souls

Arthur Wayland Ellison (1899–1994) was an actor and director who worked for the Kansas City Power and Light Company for forty-eight years before becoming a professional actor. Prior to that, he had appeared in scores of amateur stage productions in the Kansas City area. He was born in Potsdam, New York and he died in Kansas City, Missouri. Director Herk Harvey speculated that Art Ellison had acted in more industrial and educational films than any other actor in the US, including some directed by a young Robert Altman. He is best known for his part in the 1962 cult-classic horror film Carnival of Souls.

== Filmography ==
Year	Title	Role	Notes
1962	Carnival of Souls	Minister	
1973	Paper Moon	Silver Mine Gentleman	
1974	Shoot It Black, Shoot It Blue	Heon	
