= Candace Hilligoss =

American actress and former model (born 1935)

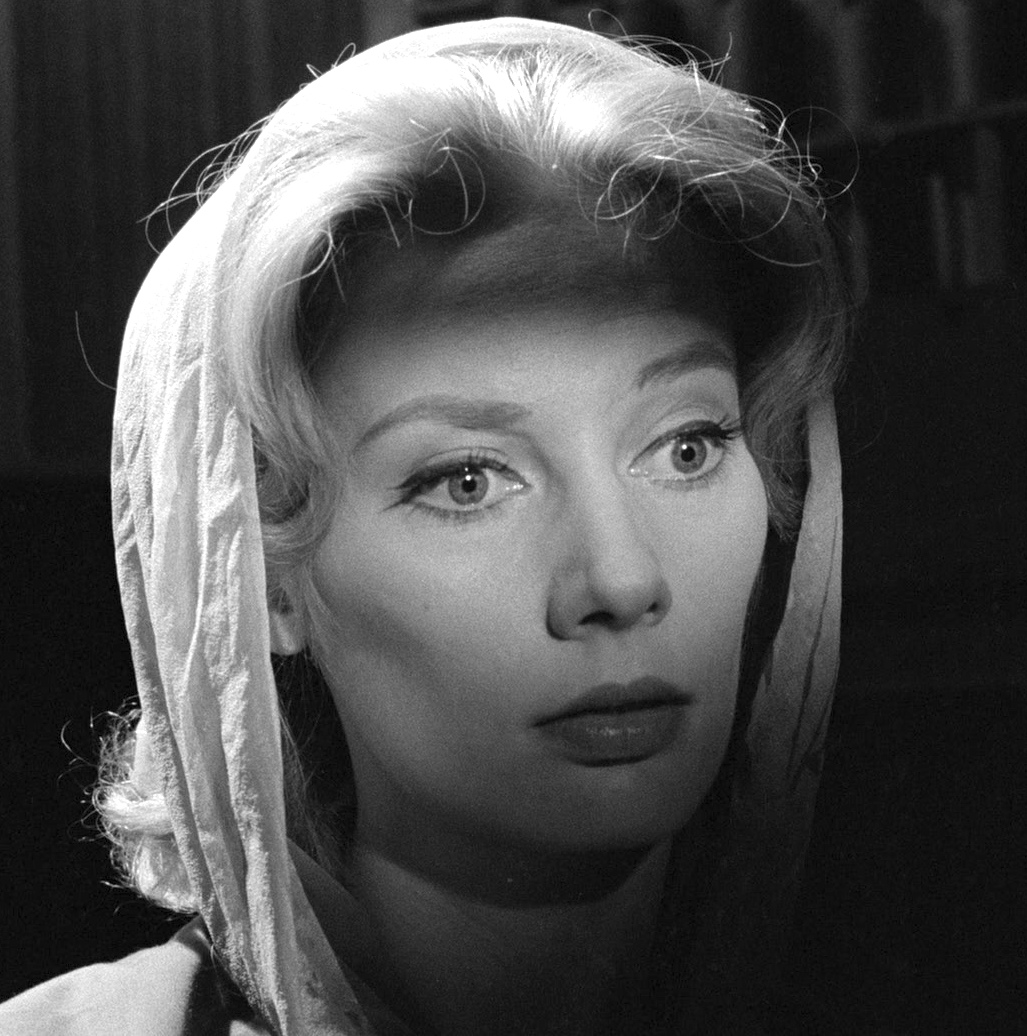
- Hilligoss in Carnival of Souls (1962)
- Born: Mary Candace Hilligoss; August 14, 1935 (age 91); Huron, South Dakota, U.S.
- Education: University of Iowa
- Occupation: Actress
- Years active: 1962–1964, 1971, 1981, 2000
- Spouse: Nicolas Coster (div. 1981)
- Children: 2
- Website: https://candacehilligoss.com/

Mary Candace Hilligoss (born August 14, 1935) is a former American actress and model. She gained fame for her role as Mary Henry in the independent horror film Carnival of Souls (1962).

== Life and career ==
=== 1935–1946: Early life ===
Mary Candace Hilligoss was born August 14, 1935 in Huron, South Dakota, the daughter of L.F. Hilligoss. She was raised in Huron, where she was active in school plays.

After studying at Huron College and the University of Iowa (where she acted in theatrical productions) for three years, she went to New York City to study acting with a scholarship to the American Theatre Wing, studying under Sanford Meisner and Lee Strasberg. She made her professional acting debut in summer stock in Pennsylvania. She acted at the Cape Cod Playhouse, appeared in a touring production of Idiot's Delight with Nina Foch, performed in television programs produced in New York, and worked as a dancer at the Copacabana nightclub.

=== 1947–1961: Modeling ===
After college, Hilligoss attended the Barbizon Modeling and Acting School in New York. Following her graduation from there in 1956, she was one of five models who traveled to South America on a month-long tour to demonstrate then-new American fashions.

=== 1962–2001: Acting career and later life ===
Carnival of Souls (1962) by Herk Harvey

She is best known for her portrayal of Mary Henry, a church organist haunted by specters, in Carnival of Souls (1962), a low-budget horror film that has developed a cult following. She had been offered a role in Richard Hilliard’s horror film Violent Midnight (1963), but opted for the role in Carnival of Souls. She stated that at the time, she took the role as a "take-the-money-and-run type of situation"; she was paid approximately $2,000 for her work in the film.

She also appeared in a supporting role in the horror film The Curse of the Living Corpse (1964), which was shot in Stamford, Connecticut, while Hilligoss was living in New York. In 1997, she was asked to appear in the remake of Carnival of Souls, but declined.

Hilligoss was married to actor Nicolas Coster, with whom she had two daughters, Candace and Dinneen. They divorced in 1981. As of 1990, Hilligoss lived in Beverly Hills, California. Her self-published memoir The Odyssey and the Idiocy – Marriage to an Actor was published in 2017.

In 2022, Hilligoss voiced an animated version of herself as she appeared circa 1962 in the CG animated short film Once Upon A Time on Mars.

== Filmography ==
=== Film ===
Year	Title	Role	Notes	Ref.
1962	Carnival of Souls	Mary Henry		
1964	The Curse of the Living Corpse	Deborah Benson		
1971	South of Hell Mountain	Helen	Uncredited	
2001	Talk Fast	Herself	Documentary	
2022	Once Upon A Time on Mars	Astro-Gal	Voice, animated short film	

=== Television ===
Year	Title	Role	Notes	Ref.
1962	Naked City	Mrs. Harris	Episode: "Hold For Gloria Christmas"	
1981	Quincy, M.E.	Actress Kimberly / Victoria Sawyer	Episode: "Stain of Guilt"	

== Sources ==
- Hilligoss, Candace (2016). The Odyssey and The Idiocy, Marriage to an Actor, A Memoir. Ridge Wood Heights, Florida: First Edition Design Publishing. ISBN 978-1-506-90116-9.
- Weaver, Tom (2003). Double Feature Creature Attack: A Monster Merger of Two More Volumes of Classic Interviews. Jefferson, North Carolina: McFarland. ISBN 978-0-786-48215-3.
- Weaver, Tom (2011). I Was a Monster Movie Maker: Conversations with 22 SF and Horror Filmmakers. Jefferson, North Carolina: McFarland. ISBN 978-0-786-46265-0.
