= Herk Harvey =

American filmmaker

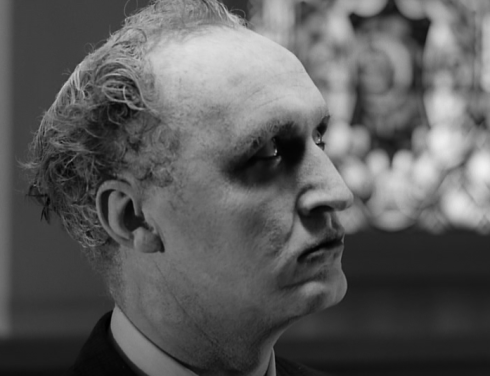
- Harvey as "The Man" in Carnival of Souls
- Born: June 3, 1924; Windsor, Colorado, U.S.
- Died: April 3, 1996 (aged 71); Lawrence, Kansas, U.S.
- Occupations: Film director, screenwriter, film producer, actor
- Years active: 1950–1983
- Spouses: Bernice Luella Brady (m. 1950; div. 1960) Pauline G. Pappas (m. 1967)

Harold Arnold "Herk" Harvey (June 3, 1924 – April 3, 1996) was an American film director, screenwriter, actor and film producer, best known for his 1962 horror film Carnival of Souls.

== Early life ==
Harvey was born in Windsor, Colorado, the son of Everett and Minnie R. Prewitt Harvey. He grew up in Waverly, Illinois and in Fort Collins and was a graduate of Fort Collins High School before serving in the U.S. Navy as a Quartermaster, 3rd Class, during World War II, during which time he was studying chemical engineering. "But when I got out," Harvey said, "I decided that wasn't for me and so I went into the theater."

Harvey came to Lawrence, Kansas in 1945 to study at the University of Kansas, where he majored in theater and acted in scores of college stage productions, including Hay Fever, The Skin of Our Teeth, Beggar on Horseback, Juno and the Paycock, A Midsummer Night's Dream, Joan of Lorraine, Blithe Spirit, Harvey, and Hamlet. During his years at KU, Harvey served as vice-president of the Dramatics Workshop and was a member of the Owl Society, an honorary organization for male juniors. He earned a bachelor of science degree in education from the KU speech and drama department in 1948 and subsequently became employed by that department as an instructor, while also a graduate student.

Harvey made his directorial debut with an "experimental" production of Irwin Shaw's Bury the Dead in 1949, and went on to direct several other plays and pageants at the university. He received his master of arts degree in speech and dramatics from KU in 1950. The subject of his master's thesis was his experience directing Bury the Dead for the KU stage. Besides his student appearances, Harvey gained acting experience through some work in summer stock, performing on the stages of the Topeka Civic Theater and Kansas City's Resident Theater. It was with the latter organization that Harvey portrayed Stanley Kowalski in a 1958 production of A Streetcar Named Desire.

On June 3, 1950, Harvey's 26th birthday, he married Bernice "Bea" Brady, a Wichita native with whom he had performed in numerous KU theater productions. Immediately following the marriage, Harvey did a graduate study in drama during the 1950 summer session at the University of Denver, and then studied at the University of Colorado for a doctorate. "I made it through summer school and then I decided to go back to Kansas," Harvey has said. He and his wife then returned to Lawrence and both landed jobs teaching theater, Harvey at KU and his wife at the local high school.

== Centron Films ==
While teaching and directing at the university, Harvey broke into the film business as an actor in some of the movies being made by Centron Corporation of Lawrence, an independent industrial and educational film production company. Founded in 1947 in Lawrence by Arthur H. Wolf and Russell A. Mosser, Centron would come to the forefront of the industrial and educational film companies in the United States. Harvey joined the staff in 1952 and went on to work for Centron as a film director, writer, and producer for over three decades, making a variety of short industrial, educational, documentary, and government films. Films created by Harvey include Shake Hands With Danger, which won a 1980 Golden Eagle award from the Council on International Nontheatrical Events. Centron competed with large companies on both coasts to become one of the top producers of industrial and educational films. Harvey was known for his high quality films, coming in on time and under budget. Harvey and his film crews were dispatched to far-flung locations around the globe to bring back images for geography and travel films. Harvey also worked with many well-known professional actors and entertainers in Centron films, such as Walter Pidgeon, Rowan and Martin, Dennis Day, Louis Nye, George Gobel, Billy Barty, Anita Bryant, Eddie Albert, Ed Ames, Jesse White, and Ricardo Montalbán. The director won many national and international awards for his work, including the highest honors from the American Film Festival, C.I.N.E., and the Columbus Film Festival.

An article written by Harvey was published in the March 1956 issue of American Cinematographer magazine, concerning innovative special effects techniques that had been developed by the Centron crew during the production of an industrial film. Harvey also occasionally penned reviews of local theater productions for the Lawrence newspaper. In 1957, Harvey commissioned the construction of a custom-built house within a block of the Centron studios. The resultant home was hailed regionally as an exceptional display of modern suburban architecture and attracted thousands of spectators when opened for public inspection upon its completion. The home's hillside yard was criss-crossed with a winding network of stone walls and terraces, built by Harvey himself.

Harvey and his first wife Bea were divorced in 1960, due to the latter's infidelity, and shortly afterward Harvey met Pauline G. Pappas, who was one of the investors for Carnival of Souls. The two were married in 1967.

When a crew from ABC came to Lawrence in 1982 to shoot the controversial television movie on nuclear war, The Day After, they cast Harvey in a small speaking role as a farmer, while also casting a handful of other local thespians. The film was broadcast to much international publicity and controversy in 1983.

In 1981, Arthur Wolf and Russell Mosser had sold Centron to the Coronet division of Esquire, Inc., though production operations continued in Lawrence until decade's end. After 33 years with the firm, Harvey retired from Centron in 1985. His last project for the company was a prize-winning series of educational travelogues shot in Korea.

After his retirement, Harvey continued in various activities, teaching film production at the University of Kansas, adjudicating films for the American Film Festival and the Kansas Film and Video Festival, and directing and acting in plays for the Lawrence Community Theater. He also had small speaking parts in the made-for-TV movies Murderer Ordained and Where Pigeons Go to Die, both of which were filmed on location in Kansas.

== Carnival of Souls ==
Carnival of Souls (1962) by Herk Harvey

Harvey is best known for his sole feature film, Carnival of Souls, a low budget 1962 horror film starring Candace Hilligoss. It was produced and directed by Harvey for an estimated $33,000. Harvey had witnessed the recent success of Elmer Rhoden Jr. and fellow industrial filmmaker Robert Altman in producing low-budget feature films in nearby Kansas City, and began to secure backing from local investors in order to mount a similar project in Lawrence. While returning to Kansas after shooting a Centron film in California, Harvey developed the idea for Carnival of Souls after driving past the abandoned Saltair Pavilion in Salt Lake City, Utah. Hiring an unknown New York actress, Lee Strasberg-trained Hilligoss, and otherwise employing mostly local talent, Harvey shot Carnival of Souls in three weeks, on location in Lawrence and Salt Lake City, using a script penned by Centron associate John Clifford. Harvey also played an uncredited role as the film's most prominent "ghoul." Originally marketed as a B film and released by an upstart distribution company that quickly went bankrupt, Carnival of Souls never gained widespread public attention upon its original release but today has become hailed as a cult classic. Set to an organ score by Gene Moore, Carnival of Souls relies more on atmosphere than on special effects to create its mood of psychological horror. The film has a large cult following, built up primarily via late-night television screenings, and has been released on DVD by the Criterion Collection (complete with a host of special features, including an hour of excerpts from Harvey's Centron productions). To this day, the movie is still discussed by film buffs and occasionally has screenings at Halloween and art film festivals.

Discouraged by the apparent failure of Carnival of Souls and busy with Centron assignments, Harvey never directed another feature, though he did make several aborted attempts. One was Flannagan's Smoke, a comedy script written by John Clifford concerning an escaped gas from a chemist's laboratory and its effect on the townspeople. Another was The Reluctant Witch, with a screenplay adapted by KU professor James E. Gunn from his own science fiction short story of the same title. Unlike Carnival of Souls, this was actually to be a Centron production, as Harvey had persuaded the company to delve into feature films. Shooting did begin, in the late 1960s, but it was not long before budgetary problems and conflicts with the lead actor ultimately shut down the production of The Reluctant Witch. Some unedited footage still survives. Harvey also wrote an un-produced feature screenplay of his own, entitled Windwagon, which was a historical dramatization of the Kansas territorial period and "sailing wagon" innovations of the late nineteenth century.

Harvey did live to see the belated recognition of Carnival of Souls, which began in earnest during the mid-1980s. The peak of this revival of interest was a nationally publicized cast and crew reunion in Lawrence in 1989, followed by the movie's first legal release on home video, which sparked a number of high-profile reviews and articles. Several years later, Harvey was diagnosed with pancreatic cancer. On April 3, 1996, weeks after the sound stage at KU's Oldfather Studios (home of the KU film school and formerly Centron's headquarters) was officially christened the "Herk Harvey Sound Stage" in a large ceremony, Harvey died at his home in Lawrence.

The Academy Film Archive preserved Carnival of Souls in 2012.
