= List of Tales from the Crypt episodes =

The following is a list of episodes for the television series Tales from the Crypt, which aired for seven seasons on HBO from 1989 to 1996. A total of 93 episodes and three feature-length films were produced.

== Series overview ==
Tales from the Crypt series overview
Season	Episodes	Originally released	
Season	Episodes	First released	Last released
1	6	June 10, 1989	June 28, 1989
2	18	April 21, 1990	July 31, 1990
3	14	June 15, 1991	August 28, 1991
4	14	June 27, 1992	September 16, 1992
5	13	October 2, 1993	December 8, 1993
6	15	October 31, 1994	January 25, 1995
7	13	April 19, 1996	July 19, 1996

== Episodes ==
=== Season 1 (1989) ===
No. overall	No. in season	Title	Source	Directed by	Written by	Original release date
1	1	"The Man Who Was Death"	The Crypt of Terror #17 (#1)	Walter Hill	Robert Reneau and Walter Hill	June 10, 1989
Niles Talbot (William Sadler), a prison executioner, is laid off from his job when the local legislature abolishes the death penalty. From there, he becomes a vigilante, administering his own style of justice to acquitted murder suspects. Also starring Gerrit Graham, Roy Brocksmith, Patti Yasutake and Mimi Kennedy.
2	2	"And All Through the House"	The Vault of Horror #35 (#24)	Robert Zemeckis	Fred Dekker	June 10, 1989
Elizabeth (Mary Ellen Trainor), a greedy, philandering housewife, kills her second husband (Marshall Bell) for his insurance money. Upon getting rid of the body, she is unexpectedly attacked by an escaped mental patient (Larry Drake) dressed as Santa Claus who has been going around killing women. She soon fears that her young daughter may be the psychotic Santa's next victim.
3	3	"Dig That Cat… He's Real Gone"	The Haunt of Fear #21	Richard Donner	Terry Black	June 10, 1989
A carnival daredevil known as Ulric the Undying (Joe Pantoliano) is buried alive for his grand finale. Through a series of flashbacks, he tells the viewers how he was formerly a homeless vagrant who had undergone a doctor's experiment in order to transfer a cat's gland into his brain, giving him its nine lives and the ability to temporarily resurrect a number of times. However, during his final stunt, he suddenly remembers that he may have miscounted just how many lives he has left. Also starring Robert Wuhl. Note: The episode's working title was originally "Dying for Dollars".
4	4	"Only Sin Deep"	The Haunt of Fear #24	Howard Deutch	Fred Dekker	June 14, 1989
Sylvia Vane (Lea Thompson), a young, narcissistic prostitute, "sells" her beauty to a voodoo-dabbling pawnbroker (Britt Leach) so that she can use the money to snag a rich bachelor, Ronnie Price (Brett Cullen), but she soon regrets it when her face begins to unexpectedly age at an accelerated rate.
5	5	"Lover Come Hack to Me"	The Haunt of Fear #19	Tom Holland	Michael McDowell	June 21, 1989
Peggy and Charles (Amanda Plummer and Stephen Shellen) are a newlywed couple who, after a car accident, end up settling for the night inside a decrepit mansion belonging to Peggy's aunt. While inside, Charles plans to kill Peggy for her inheritance, but he soon learns that Peggy's family has a dark past, and that Peggy herself is not who she seems to be.
6	6	"Collection Completed"	The Vault of Horror #25 (#14)	Mary Lambert	Battle Davis & Randolph Davis and A. Whitney Brown	June 28, 1989
An uptight elderly man named Jonas (M. Emmet Walsh) is forced into retirement, and soon discovers his wife Anita's (Audra Lindley) obsession with adopting animals into their home, leading him to use the animals for a hobby of his own.

=== Season 2 (1990) ===
No. overall	No. in season	Title	Source	Directed by	Written by	Original release date
7	1	"Dead Right"	Shock SuspenStories #6	Howard Deutch	Andy Wolk	April 21, 1990
In 1950, gold-digging secretary Cathy Finch (Demi Moore) marries Charlie Marno (Jeffrey Tambor), an overweight, unhygienic, and grotesque slob of a man after being told by a fortune teller, Madame Vorna (Natalia Nogulich), that he will die shortly after inheriting a large sum of money. Vorna's prediction does come true, but not in the way that Cathy expects. Also starring Kate Hodge and Earl Boen.
8	2	"The Switch"	Tales from the Crypt #45	Arnold Schwarzenegger	Richard Tuggle and Michael Taav	April 21, 1990
A dying elderly bachelor named Carlton Webster (William Hickey), wants to propose to his crush, a young woman named Linda (Kelly Preston). After being rejected for his age and realizing plastic surgery cannot do much, Carlton ends up meeting a discredited doctor who helps him slowly switch bodies with Hans (Rick Rossovich), an East German refugee. In the end, Carlton discovers that Linda's affection comes at a price he simply cannot afford. Also starring Ian Abercrombie, Mark Pellegrino and Roy Brocksmith. Arnold Schwarzenegger, who directed this episode, appears in the cold open with the Cryptkeeper, even introducing the story in his place.
9	3	"Cutting Cards"	Tales from the Crypt #32	Walter Hill	Mae Woods & Walter Hill	April 21, 1990
Reno Crevice and Sam Forney (Lance Henriksen and Kevin Tighe), a pair of rival gamblers who hate each other with a passion, face off in a series of increasingly dangerous and gruesome games in order to see who will leave town when all is said and done. Also starring Roy Brocksmith.
10	4	"'Til Death"	The Vault of Horror #28	Chris Walas	Jeri Barchilon	April 24, 1990
Land owner Logan Andrews (D. W. Moffett) woos the haughty, snobby, and wealthy Margaret Richardson (Pamela Gien) to help finance a development project. While Margaret initially rejects his advances, Logan wins her over with a potion from his ex, voodoo priestess Psyche (Janet Hubert), that contains a deadly warning. Things quickly go awry when Logan does not heed said warning, resulting in an undead Margaret amorously chasing him without end. Also starring Aubrey Morris.
11	5	"Three's a Crowd"	Shock SuspenStories #11	David Burton Morris	Kim Ketelsen & Annie Willette and David Burton Morris	May 1, 1990
Down-on-their-luck couple Richard and Della (Gavan O'Herlihy and Ruth de Sosa) are invited to a cabin owned by their wealthy former best man, Alan (Paul Lieber). However, the unstable Richard slowly becomes convinced that Della is having an affair with Alan. After murdering the two of them, Richard realizes just how wrong he was; not just about the supposed affair, but for the reason the two were being so secretive.
12	6	"The Thing from the Grave"	Tales from the Crypt #22	Fred Dekker	Fred Dekker	May 8, 1990
Stacy (Teri Hatcher), a supermodel, and her photographer Devlin (Kyle Secor) fall in love. When Stacy's abusive fiancée, Mitch (Miguel Ferrer), learns of their affair, he sets out to kill Devlin. However, Mitch soon gets a nasty surprise when he discovers, thanks to a supernatural necklace, Devlin's love for Stacy proves to be strong even in the face of death itself.
13	7	"The Sacrifice"	Shock SuspenStories #10	Richard Alan Greenberg	Ross Thomas	May 15, 1990
Insurance agent James (Kevin Kilner) kills his obnoxious client Sebastian Fielding in a plot to take his money and his wife Gloria (Kim Delaney). He soon finds out, however, that this will be quite difficult for him to get away with, since his boss, Jerry (Michael Ironside), shows up to reveal that he knows about the murder, and blackmails James to meet his demands.
14	8	"For Cryin' Out Loud"	Shock SuspenStories #15	Jeffrey Price	Peter S. Seaman & Jeffrey Price	May 22, 1990
Rock promoter Marty Slash (Lee Arenberg) plans to run off with all of the donation money that has been raised and accumulated from a series of "Save the Amazon rainforest" charity benefit concerts, but things unexpectedly become complicated when it turns out that his hearing problems were nothing more than his conscience (voiced by Sam Kinison) trying to get through to him. To make matters worse, his greedy banker (Katey Sagal) soon blackmails him for half of the money, while his conscience is trying to get him to do the right thing. This episode was unique in that the ending was revealed beforehand and the story that led up to it told in flashback. Iggy Pop makes a cameo appearance as himself.
15	9	"Four-Sided Triangle"	Shock SuspenStories #17	Tom Holland	James Tugend and Tom Holland	May 29, 1990
Mary Jo (Patricia Arquette), a fugitive on the run, is forced into labor on the farm of George and Luisa Yates (Chelcie Ross and Susan Blommaert), who abuse her constantly, in exchange for being sheltered from the police. One day, Mary Jo suffers a head injury and believes that a scarecrow is her lover, which the Yates plan to use for their benefit.
16	10	"The Ventriloquist's Dummy"	Tales from the Crypt #28	Richard Donner	Frank Darabont	June 5, 1990
Aspiring ventriloquist Billy Goldman (Bobcat Goldthwait) wants to improve his craft. To that end, he seeks out his idol, retired ventriloquist Mr. Ingels (Don Rickles), for advice. Soon after, Billy finds out that his idol has a dark past, as well as a gruesome secret regarding his success in show business.
17	11	"Judy, You're Not Yourself Today"	Tales from the Crypt #25	Randa Haines	Scott Nimerfro	June 12, 1990
An elderly witch (Frances Bay) posing as a cosmetic salesperson visits the home of young, vain, and eccentric Donald and Judy (Brian Kerwin and Carol Kane). The witch convinces Judy to try on a magic necklace that allows the two of them to swap bodies in a plot to gain Judy's youth and beauty, leaving Donald to try and figure out which woman is actually his wife.
18	12	"Fitting Punishment"	The Vault of Horror #16	Jack Sholder	Jonathan David Kahn & Michael Alan Kahn and Don Mancini	June 19, 1990
Bible-misquoting funeral home director Ezra Thortonberry (Moses Gunn) cuts corners when it comes to his own line of work. Following a tragic car crash, he is made the legal guardian of his teenage nephew, Bobby (Jon Clair). Bobby becomes his uncle's apprentice mortician in order to earn his room and board, though he soon comes to resent the abusive behavior and stinginess of his uncle, especially after Ezra cripples him in a rage.
19	13	"Korman's Kalamity"	Tales from the Crypt #31	Rowdy Herrington	Terry Black	June 26, 1990
Jim Korman (Harry Anderson), a cartoonist who works on the Tales from the Crypt comic, is put-upon by his shrewish and abusive wife Mildred (Colleen Camp) to take experimental fertility pills. Later that night, a policewoman, Lorelei Phillips (Cynthia Gibb), is saved from a rapist (Richard Schiff) when a monster suddenly emerges from a washing machine and tears the rapist's head off. Seeing the same monster on an issue of Tales from the Crypt, along with other monsters that were sighted recently, Lorelei interrogates Jim, believing that he is somehow making his drawings come to life. Tom Woodruff Jr. performs the utility monsters. The Cryptkeeper makes a reference to Tales from the Crypt starting out as a magazine at the beginning of the episode.
20	14	"Lower Berth"	Tales from the Crypt #33	Kevin Yagher	Fred Dekker	July 3, 1990
Enoch (Jeff Yagher) is a two-faced person living at a traveling sideshow in the early 1900s, where he is abused by his caretaker, Mr. Sickles (Stefan Gierasch). One day, Enoch falls in love with the sideshow's newest attraction: Myrna, a 4000-year-old mummy which is said to be cursed. Also starring Lewis Arquette and Mark Rolston.
21	15	"Mute Witness to Murder"	The Crypt of Terror #18	Jim Simpson	Nancy Doyne	July 10, 1990
After witnessing a brutal murder in the apartment across from her own, Suzy (Patricia Clarkson) is rendered mute and is placed in the care of Dr. Trask (Richard Thomas). Unfortunately, not only is Dr. Trask the man who committed the crime in question, but once he discovers that Suzy recognizes him and knows what he has done, he attempts to use his power to have Suzy silenced forever.
22	16	"Television Terror"	The Haunt of Fear #17	Charlie Picerni	Randall Jahnson and G. J. Pruss	July 17, 1990
Tabloid news host Horton Rivers (Morton Downey Jr.) and his cameraman, Trip Anderson (Michael Harris), investigate the Ritter House, an abandoned house which is allegedly haunted by the ghost of Ada Ritter, an old woman who had killed several old men for their social security checks and committed suicide. Horton and his crew get more than they bargained for when a chain of supernatural happenings do indeed begin haunting them, all aired on live TV.
23	17	"My Brother's Keeper"	Shock SuspenStories #16	Peter S. Seaman	Jeffrey Price & Peter S. Seaman	July 24, 1990
Conjoined twin brothers Frank and Eddie (Timothy Stack and Jonathan Stark) have differing viewpoints about their condition. The relationship between them also becomes strained when the good-hearted, mild-mannered Frank does not want to be surgically separated from the crass and slovenly Eddie out of fear that the procedure could potentially kill them. However, when Frank finds love and Eddie resorts to murder, the former finally changes his mind. Also starring Jessica Harper.
24	18	"The Secret"	The Haunt of Fear #24	J. Michael Riva	Doug Ronning	July 31, 1990
Theodore (Mike Simmrin), a 12-year-old orphan, is finally able to leave the orphanage he lives in when he is adopted by a rich, childless couple known as the Colberts (William Frankfather and Grace Zabriskie). Unknown to Theodore, his new parents harbor a dark secret. However, unknown to the Colberts, Theodore has a dark secret of his own. Also starring Larry Drake, Georgann Johnson, Stella Hall, and Gary Schwartz as the voice of the werewolf.

=== Season 3 (1991) ===
No. overall	No. in season	Title	Source	Directed by	Written by	Original release date
25	1	"Loved to Death"	Tales from the Crypt #25	Tom Mankiewicz	Joe Minion and John Mankiewicz	June 15, 1991
Aspiring screenwriter Edward Foster (Andrew McCarthy) has a crush on his neighbor, aspiring actress Miranda Singer (Mariel Hemingway). After failing to get Miranda to notice him, Edward finally gains her affection with a potion given to him by his woman-hating landlord (David Hemmings). Eventually, Edward begins to regret his choice after Miranda's newfound obsession with him becomes too much for him to handle. Also starring Kathleen Freeman as Mrs. Parker.
26	2	"Carrion Death"	Shock SuspenStories #9	Steven E. de Souza	Steven E. de Souza	June 15, 1991
Earl Raymond Diggs (Kyle MacLachlan), a murderer that has recently escaped prison, is running for the Mexican border. He is pursued by a state trooper (George DelHoyo) that ends up slapping the handcuffs on him. Diggs manages to kill the trooper, but the trooper manages to swallow the key before dying. With no other options to remove the cuffs, Diggs is forced to drag the trooper's corpse across the desert to freedom, all the while being stalked by a hungry vulture.
27	3	"The Trap"	Shock SuspenStories #18	Michael J. Fox	Scott Alexander	June 15, 1991
Lou Paloma (Bruce McGill), an obnoxious, egotistical, mean-spirited deadbeat who cannot hold down a job, is horribly in debt, and is both unfaithful and abusive (verbally and physically) to his wife, Irene (Teri Garr) ropes her and his brother, Billy (Bruno Kirby), into a plan to fake his own death, collect his life insurance money, and escape to a new life in Rio de Janeiro. Unfortunately, Lou is unaware that both his long-suffering wife and brother, who have developed an attraction to one another, are planning to double-cross him. Michael J. Fox, who directed this episode, plays the prosecutor, and James Tolkan plays a policeman investigating the "murder scene".
28	4	"Abra Cadaver"	Tales from the Crypt #37 (as "Dead Right!")	Stephen Hopkins	Jim Birge	June 19, 1991
Years ago, Carl Fairbanks (Tony Goldwyn) and his brother Martin (Beau Bridges) were medical students. Carl played a prank on Martin which unexpectedly gave him a stroke and paralyzed one of his hands. In the present day, Carl becomes a successful surgeon whereas Martin's paralysis limits him to a medical research job. Martin gets his revenge by injecting Carl with an experimental serum that stops Carl's heart but keeps his brain alive, essentially trapping Carl in his own body. Note: Based on the story "Dead Right!" renamed for television.
29	5	"Top Billing"	The Vault of Horror #39	Todd Holland	Myles Berkowitz	June 26, 1991
Barry Blye (Jon Lovitz), a struggling actor with a dull and drab appearance, is fired by his agent, dumped by his girlfriend, and evicted from his apartment. Desperate for work, Barry attempts to receive the lead role in a strange production of Hamlet, but is turned down by director Nelson Haliwell (John Astin), who instead gives the part to his handsome rival, Winton Robbins (Bruce Boxleitner). In a rage, Barry kills Winton to get the part, only to discover that he is actually to, in a literal sense, play the part of the long-deceased Yorick. Also starring Paul Benedict, Kimmy Robertson, Louise Fletcher, and Sandra Bernhard.
30	6	"Dead Wait"	The Vault of Horror #23	Tobe Hooper	A. L. Katz & Gilbert Adler	July 3, 1991
Red Buckley (James Remar), a thug with naturally red hair, offers to work for Duvall (John Rhys-Davies), a plantation owner on a tropical island gripped in civil war. Red teams up with Duvall's mistress, Katherine (Vanity), in order to steal Duvall's prized possession: a highly valuable black pearl. Red later double-crosses Katherine, only to be double-crossed himself by a mysterious priestess. Also starring Whoopi Goldberg as the mysterious priestess, who also appears as herself in the outro, being interviewed by the Cryptkeeper.
31	7	"The Reluctant Vampire"	The Vault of Horror #20	Elliot Silverstein	Terry Black	July 10, 1991
Donald Longtooth (Malcolm McDowell) is a vampire with a conscience. He eschews the tradition of killing mortals, instead satiating his need for blood by working as the night watchman at a blood bank. When Donald overindulges on the blood supply, the blood bank's owner, Mr. Crosswhite (George Wendt), realizes that his business is literally being sucked dry and threatens his employees with mass layoffs to avoid bankruptcy. Seeing that he must return to his old ways in order to replete his "embezzlement", Donald tries to solve his quandary by attacking dangerous criminals, all whilst struggling with the romantic advances of the blood bank's secretary (Sandra Dickinson), an investigative police detective (Paul Gleason), and vampire hunter Rupert Van Helsing (Michael Berryman).
32	8	"Easel Kill Ya"	The Vault of Horror #31	John Harrison	Larry Wilson	July 17, 1991
Jack Craig (Tim Roth), an artist and recovering alcoholic with a temper who cannot seem to sell any of his work, ends up accidentally killing a neighbor. Finding inspiration, Jack photographs the corpse, paints the scene, and sells the painting to Malcolm Mayflower (William Atherton), a collector of morbid artwork who promises to pay him large sums of money for similar paintings, which leads Jack down a dark and dangerous path.
33	9	"Undertaking Parlor"	Tales from the Crypt #39	Michael Thau	Ron Finley	July 24, 1991
Jess, Norm, Aaron, and Josh (Jason Marsden, Scott Fults, Aron Eisenberg, and Ke Huy Quan), a group of kids aspiring to be horror filmmakers, break into the local mortuary in order to see a real dead body. However, they soon stumble upon a sinister conspiracy of murder and greed, overhearing a conversation between the town's pharmacist, Mr. Grundy (Graham Jarvis), and local mortician Sebastian Esbrook (John Glover), revealing that the two have been killing townspeople with poisoned medicine so they can split the profits of the funerals. When it is tragically discovered that Josh's father was a victim of Grundy's tainted medicine, the boys plan to expose Grundy and Esbrook by taking the law into their own hands, hoping to film evidence of their murderous dealings.
34	10	"Mournin' Mess"	Tales from the Crypt #38	Manny Coto	Manny Coto	July 31, 1991
Dale Sweeney (Steven Weber), a sleazy, down-on-his-luck news writer, is currently investigating several bizarre murders of the homeless. Sweeney soon discovers that the murders may be related to the Grateful Homeless Outcasts and Unwanted Layaway Society (G.H.O.U.L.S.), a mysterious organization whose charitable façade hides a horrific secret. Also starring Rita Wilson, Ally Walker, and Vincent Schiavelli.
35	11	"Split Second"	Shock SuspenStories #4	Russell Mulcahy	Richard Christian Matheson	August 7, 1991
Liz Kelly (Michelle Johnson), a beautiful but loose barmaid, marries Steve Dixon (Brion James), the wealthy manager of a lumber camp who provides her a comfortable lifestyle. The marriage soon turns sour when Steve becomes violently jealous of anyone who even looks at his new wife. Liz eventually brings him over the edge when she begins seducing another lumberjack, Ted (Billy Wirth), in order to relieve her perpetual boredom.
36	12	"Deadline"	Shock SuspenStories #12	Walter Hill	Mae Woods & Walter Hill	August 14, 1991
Charles McKenzie (Richard Jordan), a newspaper journalist who has nearly ruined his career after many years of alcoholism, swears to give up drinking in order to get his old job back. He soon meets a young woman, Vicki (Marg Helgenberger), and the two begin having a fling. With Vicki's influence helping him along the way, Charles is offered his job back if he can bring in a murder story. Upon hearing the owner of a diner murder his wife in the diner's kitchen, Charles believes he has his story, at least until he discovers who the wife is. Also starring Richard Herd and Jon Polito.
37	13	"Spoiled"	The Haunt of Fear #26	Andy Wolk	Connie Johnson & Doug Ronning	August 21, 1991
In a meta-layered spoof of daytime soap operas, Janet (Faye Grant), a housewife who is obsessed with the soap opera There's Always Tomorrow and watches the program religiously, is annoyed that her doctor husband, Leon (Alan Rachins), is more obsessed with experimenting on a rabbit than spending time with her. When her TV loses picture at a crucial moment in the show, Janet calls in a cable man named Abel (Anthony LaPaglia), to have cable installed. Inspired by There's Always Tomorrow's no-nonsense main character, Fuschia Monroe (Anita Morris), Janet begins a steamy affair with Abel while Leon is distracted with his work. When Leon catches the two of them in the act, he soon wonders if he could try his experiment on human subjects. Also starring Tristan Rogers and Annabelle Gurwitch.
38	14	"Yellow"	Shock SuspenStories #1	Robert Zemeckis	Jim Thomas & John Thomas and A. L. Katz & Gilbert Adler	August 28, 1991
In 1918, during World War I, General Calthrob's (Kirk Douglas) son, the cowardly Lieutenant Martin Calthrob (Eric Douglas) requests a discharge from the army. Martin's father mentions that while he cannot discharge his son, he agrees to transfer him away from the front if he completes a specific mission. Unfortunately, Martin's cowardice prevents him from warning the men under his command that German troops are approaching, and he leaves them all to die while he runs for his life. After the dying Sergeant Ripper (Lance Henriksen) exposes Martin's actions and labels him "yellow", Martin is arrested, court-martialed, and sentenced to death by firing squad. The night before Martin's execution, General Calthrob tells his son that he has swapped the bullets with blanks, so that Martin can survive the planned execution and escape to a new life, provided that he faces death with dignity. Also starring Dan Aykroyd as Captain Milligan. Note: This is the only episode of the entire series to run longer than 30 minutes. It is also the first episode featured that was produced as part of the failed Two-Fisted Tales spin-off. Director Robert Zemeckis used this episode to pay homage to Stanley Kubrick's 1957 film Paths of Glory, which also starred Kirk Douglas and featured some similar themes. Father-and-son actors Kirk and Eric Douglas portray father and son on screen.

=== Season 4 (1992) ===
No. overall	No. in season	Title	Source	Directed by	Written by	Original release date
39	1	"None but the Lonely Heart"	Tales from the Crypt #33	Tom Hanks	Donald Longtooth	June 27, 1992
Howard Prince (Treat Williams) is a sociopathic criminal who routinely marries rich elderly widows, then poisons them and leaves them to die while he steals their money. Deciding to murder one more victim before going on the run, he manages to successfully charm Effie Gluckman (Frances Sternhagen), who is excited to have his company. Eventually, Howard discovers that someone is on to him, since he soon gets a series of notes from someone that knows what he is doing and warns him to stop, or else risk facing dire consequences. Also starring Henry Gibson as Stanhope the butler. Tom Hanks, who directed this episode, makes a cameo appearance as the video dating service owner. Boxing legend Sugar Ray Leonard also makes a cameo appearance as the gravedigger.
40	2	"This'll Kill Ya"	Crime SuspenStories #23	Robert Longo	A. L. Katz & Gilbert Adler	June 27, 1992
Diabetic scientific researcher George Gatlin (Dylan McDermott) discovers that he has been injected with H-Cell-24, a deadly experimental virus cell, in lieu of his insulin. As H-Cell-24 has no antidote, George learns that the virus will cause tumors to grow all over his body and kill him in a matter of hours. After hearing what he believes to be evidence that his lab partners, Sophie Wagner and Pack Brightman (Sônia Braga and Cleavon Little), have purposely injected him with the virus in a plot to kill him, George vows to use what little time he has left to get revenge on his colleagues. Note: This was Cleavon Little's final acting performance. He died four months after this episode aired.
41	3	"On a Deadman's Chest"	The Haunt of Fear #12	William Friedkin	Larry Wilson	June 27, 1992
Danny Darwin (Yul Vazquez), the hard-partying front man of the heavy metal band Exorcist, announces at the band's latest show that his best friend, guitarist Nick Bosch (Paul Hipp), has gotten married. Danny fears that Nick's wife, Scarlett (Tia Carrere), is attempting to break up the band, giving him a burning hatred for her. His groupie, Vendetta (Sherrie Rose), also hates Scarlett, and helps Danny calm down by letting him visit Farouche (Heavy D), a mysterious tattoo artist who ends up giving him a tattoo of Scarlett on his chest. Things quickly become surreal when the tattoo seems to develop a life of its own and will not go away, even after Danny murders the object of his hatred. Also starring musicians Gregg Allman (as the club owner), Rudy Sarzo (uncredited as Exorcist's bass player), and Steve Jones (as Exorcist's roadie).
42	4	"Seance"	The Vault of Horror #25	Gary Fleder	Harry Anderson	July 4, 1992
In a noir-themed tale, Alison Peters and Benjamin Polosky (Cathy Moriarty and Ben Cross) are a pair of con artists who attempt to swindle rich tycoon Presco Chalmers (John Vernon) out of his fortune with an elaborate story. When they accidentally end up killing him, they instead attempt to trick the fortune out of his blind and spiritual wife (Ellen Crawford) by acting as her medium and holding a mock séance.
43	5	"Beauty Rest"	The Vault of Horror #35	Stephen Hopkins	Donald Longtooth	July 11, 1992
Helen (Mimi Rogers), an aging model, ends up losing a commercial deal to her younger roommate, Joyce (Kathy Ireland). When she learns that Joyce is also participating in a rigged beauty pageant, Helen attempts to knock her unconscious with sleeping pills to take her place and revive her own career, but accidentally causes her to overdose. At the pageant, Helen eventually murders her rival Druscilla (Jennifer Rubin). She is soon named the winner and gets her big break, only to learn that the pageant, including the grand prize, has a rather macabre "autopsy" theme. Also starring Buck Henry.
44	6	"What's Cookin'"	The Haunt of Fear #12	Gilbert Adler	A. L. Katz & Gilbert Adler	July 22, 1992
Married couple Fred and Erma (Christopher Reeve and Bess Armstrong) are the owners of a failing restaurant with a squid-only menu. One day, Fred and Erma's luck is soon changed when Gaston (Judd Nelson), a mysterious drifter who works as the restaurant's janitor, gives them some steaks that turns out to taste delicious, so much so that the restaurant gets a huge boost in both sales and popularity. However, Fred discovers that Gaston's steaks are made of the flesh of his landlord, Chumley (Meat Loaf), who Gaston killed and butchered. The sight leaves Fred to be torn between going to the police or allowing more people to be killed so they can be put on the menu and save the restaurant.
45	7	"The New Arrival"	The Haunt of Fear #25	Peter Medak	Ron Finley	July 25, 1992
Dr. Alan Goetz (David Warner), an arrogant and snobbish child psychologist, learns that his radio show is on the verge of cancellation. In an attempt to boost his sagging ratings, he decides to do a series of episodes from the home of regular caller Nora (Zelda Rubinstein), a strange woman who wants help for her deeply disturbed daughter, Felicity. Also starring Joan Severance, Twiggy, and Robert Patrick.
46	8	"Showdown"	Two-Fisted Tales #37	Richard Donner	Frank Darabont	August 1, 1992
After killing Texas ranger "Tracker" Tom McMurdo (David Morse), Billy Quintaine (Neil Giuntoli), a remorseless gunslinger on the run from the law, wanders into a saloon and proceeds to get his comeuppance when the spirits of all of his past victims come back to haunt him. Note: This episode was originally produced for the failed Two-Fisted Tales spin-off.
47	9	"King of the Road"	Original script (see below)	Tom Holland	Randall Jahnson	August 8, 1992
Sherriff Joe Garrett (Raymond J. Barry) is confronted by Billy (Brad Pitt), a cocky hoodlum and street racer who has learned that years before Joe himself was once a legendary street racer known as "Iceman" who gave it up when a rival was accidentally killed (similar to Rebel Without a Cause), and attempts to challenge him to a race. The stakes are raised significantly when Billy kidnaps Joe's daughter in order to blackmail him into racing him. Left with no other options, Joe is forced to come out of retirement and participate in one last race to save his daughter's life. In a twist ending, Billy wins the race yet loses while Joe gets his happily ever after. Note: The Two-Fisted Tales comic book cover shown in the episode is a spoof. This tale came from the script for the film Two-Fisted Tales that was "based" on the comic book series of the same name along with the Tales from the Crypt stories "Yellow" and "Showdown". Warren Zevon provides the soundtrack for this episode.
48	10	"Maniac at Large"	Crime SuspenStories #27	John Frankenheimer	Mae Woods	August 19, 1992
Margaret (Blythe Danner), a meek librarian in an inner-city library, learns that a serial killer is loose in the area, and begins believing that she will be the killer's next victim. To make things worse, head librarian Mrs. Pritchard (Salome Jens) forces Margaret to work late one night. Left alone after closing time in a library that is usually frequented by suspicious characters and not knowing exactly who the serial killer is, Margaret's paranoia ends up overwhelming her. Also starring Clarence Williams III, Adam Ant, and Obba Babatundé.
49	11	"Split Personality"	The Vault of Horror #30	Joel Silver	Fred Dekker	August 26, 1992
Small-time swindler Vic Stetson (Joe Pesci) ends up experiencing car trouble outside a bizarrely designed mansion. Letting himself inside so he can use the phone, he meets the mansion's occupants: reclusive twin sisters April and June Blair (Jacqueline Alexandra Citron and Kristen Amber Citron). After learning that they are worth a combined $2 billion, Vic creates Jack, a twin brother of his own, so he can trick both twins into dating and marrying him in a plot to steal their combined inheritance. However, Vic soon gets a nasty surprise when he discovers that the twins harbor a dark and dangerous secret. Featuring brief appearances by Burt Young and Joe Pantoliano.
50	12	"Strung Along"	The Vault of Horror #33	Kevin Yagher	Yale Udoff and Kevin Yagher	September 2, 1992
Retired puppeteer Joseph Renfield (Donald O'Connor), who used to make children laugh with his signature character Koko the Clown, is offered a chance to revive his act for a tribute to the golden age of television. Due to his age, his young and dominant wife, Ellen (Patricia Charbonneau), suggests that Joseph hire someone to help with the performance. Ellen introduces Joseph to her friend David (Zach Galligan), an animatronic puppeteer, as his new assistant. However, a game of deception soon begins when love letters are found in Ellen's dresser, leading Joseph to question if Ellen is unfaithful to him.
51	13	"Werewolf Concerto"	The Vault of Horror #16	Steve Perry	Scott Nimerfro	September 9, 1992
In an Agatha Christie–style mystery, a group of guests at a hotel discover that one of them has been gruesomely killed, and suspect that there may be a werewolf lurking in the nearby woods. When a mudslide blocks off the only road out, the hotel manager, Antoine (Dennis Farina), hires Lokai (Timothy Dalton), a werewolf hunter who vows to find and exterminate the beast. But before he can do so, Lokai must figure out just who the werewolf is. Also starring Beverly D'Angelo, Reginald VelJohnson, Lela Rochon, Charles Fleischer, Walter Gotell, and Wolfgang Puck as the hotel's master chef.
52	14	"Curiosity Killed"	Tales from the Crypt #36	Elliot Silverstein	Stanley Ralph Ross	September 16, 1992
Jack (Kevin McCarthy) and Cynthia (Margot Kidder), an elderly couple who hate each other, are camping in the woods with fellow elderly couple Harry and Lucille (J. A. Preston and Madge Sinclair), who are more tolerable of one another. Harry, a retired Marine whom Jack had saved during Guadalcanal, wishes to repay Jack by means of Lucille, who is a voodoo priestess. Lucille reveals the reason behind the camping trip, she has been tending to a rare flower that blooms by moonlight, which is what she needs to make a potion that will make them all young and attractive. Jack also attempts to keep the secret from the bitter and overbearing Cynthia, who wants to use it for her own means.

=== Season 5 (1993) ===
No. overall	No. in season	Title	Source	Directed by	Written by	Original release date
53	1	"Death of Some Salesmen"	The Haunt of Fear #15	Gilbert Adler	A. L. Katz & Gilbert Adler	October 2, 1993
Judd Campbell (Ed Begley Jr.) is a conniving salesman who cheats people out of their money by selling them expensive burial plots for a fake cemetery. When he ends up arriving at a wrong address, he finds new victims in the form of Ma, Pa, and Winona Brackett (Tim Curry in a triple role), a strange family of rednecks with a fortune buried in their basement. Unfortunately, the Bracketts have developed a burning hatred for salesmen after being swindled once too often, and Judd ends up getting more than what he bargains for when he tries to swindle them. Also starring Yvonne De Carlo as Mrs. Jones.
54	2	"As Ye Sow"	Shock SuspenStories #14	Kyle MacLachlan	Ron Finley	October 2, 1993
Believing that his wife, Bridget (Patsy Kensit), is cheating on him, businessman Leo Burns (Héctor Elizondo) hires G. G. Devoe (Sam Waterston), a sleazy and dubious detective, to spy on her. Soon after, Devoe gathers evidence that leads Leo believe that Bridget is indeed having an affair with local priest John Sejac (John Shea). With his imagination running wild, Leo resorts to drastic measures to fix his dilemma. Featuring cameos from Adam West and Miguel Ferrer.
55	3	"Forever Ambergris"	Tales from the Crypt #44	Gary Fleder	Scott Rosenberg	October 2, 1993
Washed-up combat photographer Dalton Scott (Roger Daltrey) is told by his boss that he is losing his edge. After visiting his protégé, up-and-coming photographer Isaac "Ike" Forte (Steve Buscemi) for dinner, Dalton grows enamored with Ike's beautiful wife, Bobbi (Lysette Anthony). When Dalton and Ike are sent to Central America alongside a group of mercenaries for an assignment, the former cooks up a deadly scheme to send the latter into a village ravaged by biological weapons, where Ike eventually ends up contracting a virulent disease that causes him to rapidly decay, in an attempt to steal Bobbi from him. Also starring Paul Dooley.
56	4	"Food for Thought"	Tales from the Crypt #40	Rodman Flender	Larry Wilson	October 6, 1993
The Great Zambini (Ernie Hudson), an abusive and mentally unstable circus performer with psychic abilities and a passion for cooking, attempts to read the mind of his wife and assistant, Connie (Joan Chen), as she can already read his. When he is finally able to read Connie's mind, he does so just as she is in the middle of an affair with the show's fire-eater, Johnny (John Laughlin), causing Zambini to go insane with jealousy. Also starring Phil Fondacaro.
57	5	"People Who Live in Brass Hearses"	The Vault of Horror #27	Russell Mulcahy	Scott Nimerfro	October 13, 1993
Billy DeLuca (Bill Paxton), a thief with an addiction to butter and butter products, is released from prison after serving a two-year sentence for embezzlement. With the help of his mentally challenged brother Virgil (Brad Dourif), Billy sets out to get revenge on Earl Byrd (Michael Lerner), the jolly ice cream man who had reported him to the police, by robbing the ice cream warehouse where he works. Unfortunately, the dim-witted Virgil manages to screw up every step of Billy's plan along the way.
58	6	"Two for the Show"	Crime SuspenStories #17	Kevin Hooks	A. L. Katz & Gilbert Adler	October 20, 1993
In an homage to Strangers on a Train, Andy Conway (David Paymer), a talkative, workaholic husband, is informed by his wife Emma (Traci Lords) that she is having an affair and wants a divorce. In a rage, Andy stabs Emma to death and cuts her into pieces. He is investigated by Officer Fine (Vincent Spano), a policeman with his own marital issues. After stuffing Emma's remains in a suitcase, Andy boards a train to get rid of the evidence. When Andy discovers that Fine is on board the same train, the two men get caught up in a deadly game of cat and mouse.
59	7	"House of Horror"	Tales from the Crypt #21	Bob Gale	Bob Gale	October 27, 1993
Arling, Henderson, and Waters (Wil Wheaton, Jason London, and Keith Coogan) are three pledges of a fraternity on probation who are bullied into submission by sadistic pledge master Les Wilton (Kevin Dillon). As the final part of their initiation, the trio are challenged to get to the top floor of the Cougher House, an abandoned house rumored to be haunted by the ghost of a murderer with a hacking cough. However, when two of the pledges fail to return, Les decides to head up to the top floor of the house in order to look for them himself, only to learn that a local sorority harbors a sinister secret involving the house. Also starring Meredith Salenger as Mona.
60	8	"Well Cooked Hams"	Tales from the Crypt #27	Elliot Silverstein	Andrew Kevin Walker	November 3, 1993
In a turn-of-the-century tale, inept magician Miles Federman (Billy Zane) blames his assistant Greta (Maryam d'Abo) on a failed show and fires her. Shortly after, Miles is met by another magician, Franz Kraygen (Martin Sheen), who invites Miles to see his own show. Miles is left astonished when Kraygen demonstrates his most famous illusion: the Box of Death. When Kraygen refuses to tell Miles how he pulls off the trick, Miles kills him and steals the prop for his own show. When Miles attempts to perform the trick himself, he is unaware that the Box of Death has been sabotaged, leading to tragic consequences.
61	9	"Creep Course"	The Haunt of Fear #23	Jeffrey Boam	Jeffrey Boam	November 10, 1993
Nerdy bookworm Stella Bishop (Nina Siemaszko) is tricked by Reggie Skulnick (Anthony Michael Hall), a charismatic jock, into giving him the answers for their upcoming Egyptology test. Little does Stella know, that Reggie is in league with their Egyptology instructor, the pompous Professor Finely (Jeffrey Jones). In exchange for Finley giving him the answers to the test himself, so he can pass the course and keep his football scholarship, Reggie brings Stella to Finely's home and tricks her into becoming a virgin sacrifice for Ramseth, a long preserved mummy in search of his lover. Also starring Julius Carry as Detective Connors.
62	10	"Came the Dawn"	Shock SuspenStories #9	Uli Edel	Ron Finley	November 17, 1993
"Norma" (Brooke Shields), a criminal hitchhiker stranded on the side of the road in a thunderstorm, catches a ride with Roger (Perry King), a seemingly timid rich man who invites her to stay in his cabin while the storm clears up. As she prepares to rob Roger's cabin of its valuables, Norma learns that Roger already has a woman in his life, and that he and this woman are closer than she thinks. Also starring Michael J. Pollard.
63	11	"Oil's Well That Ends Well"	Tales from the Crypt #34	Paul Abascal	Scott Nimerfro	November 24, 1993
Con artist Jerry (Lou Diamond Phillips) and his man-hating girlfriend Gina (Priscilla Presley) believe that no one can top them when it comes to extortion. The two begin planning their next caper by tricking a quartet of Southern investors into thinking that there is oil buried underneath a local cemetery. Before long, the growing costs for digging up the supposed oil begin causing everyone to begin double crossing and backstabbing everyone else, leading to an explosive conclusion. Also starring Noble Willingham, Alan Ruck and Rory Calhoun. Note: This episode also features a cameo by John Kassir in his only on-screen appearance of the entire series. The Cryptkeeper is also seen playing the official Tales from the Crypt pinball machine in the intro, and watches the episode itself on VHS during the outro.
64	12	"Half-Way Horrible"	The Vault of Horror #26	Gregory Widen	Gregory Widen	December 1, 1993
Roger Lassen (Clancy Brown), the ruthless president of a chemical company, discovers that his key partners are being murdered one by one. He is also told that the FDA have contacted his company, which is currently developing a new long-lasting preservative known as Xenthion-B, to announce that they are considering suspending the preservative's release because of the murders. Thinking back to when he and his friends traveled to Brazil on a business trip, Roger remembers that he offered his best friend, Alex (Jon Tenney), as a human sacrifice in exchange for receiving samples of the plant Xenthion-B is created from an indigenous tribe. Concluding that Alex is the one responsible, Roger is suddenly visited by his undead former friend, who reveals that the actual killer may be closer to Roger than he thinks. Also starring Cheech Marin, Martin Kove, Charles Martin Smith, and Costas Mandylor.
65	13	"Till Death Do We Part"	The Haunt of Fear #12	W. Peter Iliff	W. Peter Iliff	December 8, 1993
Johnny Canaparo (John Stamos) is a gigolo involved with "Ruthless" Ruth Sanderson (Eileen Brennan), a wealthy and powerful middle-aged woman with heavy connections to the Mafia. When Johnny begins a forbidden affair with waitress Lucy Chadwick (Kate Vernon), Ruth finds out about the liaison and orders Johnny to kill Lucy himself, leaving Johnny to mentally debate what to do about the situation, and which woman he chooses to have in his life. Also starring Robert Picardo and Frank Stallone.

=== Season 6 (1994–1995) ===
No. overall	No. in season	Title	Source	Directed by	Written by	Original release date
66	1	"Let the Punishment Fit the Crime"	The Vault of Horror #33	Russell Mulcahy	Ron Finley	October 31, 1994
Geraldine Ferrett (Catherine O'Hara), a shameless and unscrupulous ambulance-chasing lawyer, is arrested for having an illegal license plate in the remote town of Stueksville. She discovers that the town's court system is nightmarishly backwards, presided over by three identical judges (Joseph Maher in a triple role) who sentence people to torture and even capital punishment for petty crimes. Her public defender, Austin Haggard (Peter MacNicol), tries to get each of the judges to assign Geraldine to public service, but he may have ulterior motives.
67	2	"Only Skin Deep"	Tales from the Crypt #38	William Malone	Dick Beebe	October 31, 1994
Recently coming off of a bad relationship, Carl Schlag (Peter Onorati), an accountant with a history of violent and abusive behavior, tries and fails to reconnect with his ex-girlfriend (Diane DiLasco) at a Halloween party. After striking out with her, Carl meets Molly (Sherrie Rose), a mysterious, masked woman dressed as a body bag, at the party. Carl ends up returning with Molly to her home for a romantic encounter. The next morning, however, Carl discovers that Molly is more unhinged than he is.
68	3	"Whirlpool"	The Vault of Horror #32	Mick Garris	A. L. Katz & Gilbert Adler	October 31, 1994
In a rather repetitive tale, Rolanda (Rita Rudner), a struggling artist for Tales from the Crypt, ends up being berated and fired by her boss, Vern (Richard Lewis), after presenting a particularly awful story. She returns to the office later that night and kills Vern in a drunken rage. After she is caught and gunned down by police when leaving the scene, only to wake up in her bed as if nothing has happened, Rolanda discovers that she is caught in a time loop, destined to relive the same day and the same tragic outcome over and over again, no matter how many times she tries to prevent it. Also starring Blake Clark.
69	4	"Operation Friendship"	Tales from the Crypt #41	Roland Mesa	Rob Ross	November 9, 1994
Nelson DeMears (Tate Donovan) is a meek, nerdy, and friendless computer programmer who is regularly taken advantage of by his co-workers. When he returns to his apartment after work one day, he is enthusiastically greeted by Eddie (Peter Dobson), the crass and cocky imaginary friend he has had since childhood. Eddie encourages Nelson to come out of his shell and meet some new people, particularly his new neighbor, Jane. After being encouraged to take Jane to dinner, Nelson and Eddie learn that she is a psychologist. Fearing that he will be forced out of Nelson's life if the relationship continues, Eddie does everything in his power to get Nelson to call the relationship off. Also starring Ethan Suplee.
70	5	"Revenge Is the Nuts"	The Vault of Horror #20	Jonas McCord	Shel Willens	November 16, 1994
Arnie Grunwald (Anthony Zerbe) is the sadistic and psychopathic head caretaker at a home for the blind. He routinely goes out of his way to abuse the home's patients, Samuel, Armelia, and Osgood (Isaac Hayes, Bibi Besch, and Tim Sampson), by lining the walls with razor blades, walling off the bathrooms, spilling marbles on the floor, and unleashing his tormented Rottweiler guard dog Bruno (whom he loves to starve constantly) on them. When Shelia (Teri Polo), a new patient, arrives at the home, Arnie agrees to tone down the borderline inhumane conditions at the home if she sleeps with him. Refusing to do so, Shelia teams up with the other patients and Arnie's long abused younger brother Benny (John Savage) to ensure that Arnie gets his much deserved comeuppance. Note: This episode's plot is adapted from "Blind Alleys" which was told in Tales from the Crypt #46 while using the title of the Vault of Horror story listed above.
71	6	"The Bribe"	Shock SuspenStories #7	Ramón Menéndez	Scott Nimerfro	November 23, 1994
Martin Zeller (Terry O'Quinn), a newly appointed and highly moralistic fire marshal, approaches Puck (Esai Morales), the sleazy owner of The Naked Experience, a strip club where his daughter Hiley (Kimberly Williams-Paisley) was once employed. He presents nude photos of Hiley that he was given anonymously to Puck and orders him to shut down the club. When he returns home, Hiley mentions that, due to budget cuts at her school, her college scholarship is getting revoked. In an effort to get enough money to send his daughter to college, Martin ignores his morals and returns to Puck, who bribes him with a dangerous offer. Benicio del Toro plays Bill, a security guard at the strip club. Note: Pray for Rain provides the score for this episode.
72	7	"The Pit"	The Vault of Horror #40	John Harrison	John Harrison	November 30, 1994
Martial artists Felix Johnson and Aaron Scott (Mark Dacascos and Stoney Jackson) recount how their latest bout in the ring ended in a draw. While they are accepting of the draw and of each other, their domineering managers and trophy wives, former fighters Aubrey and Andrea (Debbe Dunning and Marjean Holden), absolutely despise one another, and take their anger out on their respective husbands. Fight promoter Wink Barnum (Wayne Newton) hears about the intense rivalry both women have, and settles an agreement to enlist their husbands in a televised, no-holds-barred fight to the death. Felix and Aaron, not fond of the idea, hatch a plan of their own.
73	8	"The Assassin"	Shock SuspenStories #17	Martin von Haselberg	Scott Nimerfro	December 7, 1994
Happy housewife Janet McKay (Shelley Hack) finds her day disrupted by Simone, William, and Todd, (Chelsea Field, Jonathan Banks, and Corey Feldman) a trio of CIA operatives who break into her home. The agents explain that they are searching for her husband (Marshall Teague), whom they believe is Ronald Wald (voiced by an uncredited Cam Clarke), a former assassin gone AWOL, in an effort to kill him. They explain to Janet that they must kill her as well, to silence any witness. However, the agents are unaware that the AWOL assassin has undergone Gender transition and is Janet herself. William Sadler appears in the Cryptkeeper's scenes as the Grim Reaper (reprising his role from Bill & Ted's Bogus Journey), who partakes in a winner-take-all game that is encored with Sadler as a different character in Bordello of Blood.
74	9	"Staired in Horror"	The Vault of Horror #23	Stephen Hopkins	Colman deKay & Teller	December 14, 1994
Clyde Beaudreaux (D. B. Sweeney) is a fugitive on the run for murder. After being chased by a mob of angry townspeople led by the town sheriff (R. Lee Ermey) toward a dead end near a large house, he begs for help from the house's owner, Lilian Charbonnet (Rachel Ticotin), a seemingly senile old woman. Once he is let inside, the sheriff tells Lilian, through the door, that Clyde is wanted for the killing of a shopkeeper, but Lilian does not tell him that Clyde is inside. Once the sheriff leaves, Clyde discovers that Lilian has suddenly become younger when after going upstairs, where she reveals that her jealous husband put a curse on the house's staircase, aging any man and de-aging any woman that travels up it.
75	10	"In the Groove"	Crime SuspenStories #21	Vincent Spano	Jack Temchin & Colman deKay	December 21, 1994
Gary (Miguel Ferrer) is an abrasive, hot-tempered shock jock who works in a small radio station inherited by his hateful sister Rita (Wendie Malick). According to the will of Rita and Gary's mother, Rita is not allowed to fire her brother for bringing in low ratings, instead demoting him to the graveyard shift. Rita also assigns Gary a new partner, Valerie (Linda Doucett), who helps his ratings skyrocket. Trying to take the show in a new direction, Gary accidentally gets his show cancelled when he goes against his late mother's will and furiously defames her on the air. Deciding that Rita has gone too far, Gary resorts to murder in order to get his show back. Unfortunately, things do not go as planned. Also starring Slash.
76	11	"Surprise Party"	The Vault of Horror #37	Elliot Silverstein	Tom Lyons and Colman deKay	December 28, 1994
Ray Wells (Adam Storke) drives out to the countryside in order to claim a burned house owned by his late father, Des (Rance Howard). During the drive, Ray reminisces on his father's last moments, where Des reveals that he intends to give the property to charity. Furious about claiming what is rightfully his, Ray murders his father and burns his will. When Ray arrives at the house, he unexpectedly discovers a party going on inside, but soon learns however that both the house and the partygoers share a horrible legacy. Also starring Jake Busey.
77	12	"Doctor of Horror"	The Vault of Horror #13	Larry Wilson	Larry Wilson	January 4, 1995
Richard (Hank Azaria) and Charlie (Travis Tritt) are two bumbling security guards who work in a morgue. After discovering mad scientist Dr. Orloff (Austin Pendleton) attempting to steal a corpse, the doctor explains to the guards on how he believes, if done in just the right way, souls can be extracted from the recently deceased, having been stealing bodies in his quest to obtain one. After Orloff pays the two guards a large amount of money to steal and later dump corpses for him, Charlie begins having doubts about whether what they are doing is right or not, prompting Richard to decide that Charlie must have quite a soul himself. Also starring Ben Stein.
78	13	"Comes the Dawn"	The Haunt of Fear #26	John Herzfeld	Scott Nimerfro	January 11, 1995
Colonel Parker (Michael Ironside) and Sergeant Burrows (Bruce Payne) are a pair of veterans of Operation Desert Storm who have traveled to Alaska to do some illegal grizzly bear poaching. The soldiers meet local game warden and fellow veteran Jeri Drumbeater (Vivian Wu), who takes them to an abandoned weather station supposedly used as a hibernation site for bears. Instead, the hunters find themselves becoming the hunted when the station turns out to hold a nest of ravenous vampires. Also starring Susan Tyrrell.
79	14	"99 & 44/100% Pure Horror"	The Vault of Horror #23	Rodman Flender	Rodman Flender	January 18, 1995
Luden Sandelton (Bruce Davison), the meek and mild-mannered president of the Dermasmooth soap company, decides that the company's latest advertising campaign is a failure. To that end, he ends up firing the person who designed the artwork: Willa (Cristi Conaway), his greedy, unfaithful, and narcissistic wife, who has a penchant for gory artwork. Upon learning that she has been fired and that her work is being universally panned, Willa goes on a psychotic rampage, getting her own deadly ideas to rectify the situation.
80	15	"You, Murderer"	Shock SuspenStories #14	Robert Zemeckis	A. L. Katz & Gilbert Adler	January 25, 1995
In this unique tale, Lou Spinelli, the corpse of a former criminal-turned legitimate businessman who, thanks to plastic surgery, bears a striking resemblance to Humphrey Bogart (portrayed by Bogart himself through archive footage and voiced by Bogart impersonator Robert Sacchi), reminisces on the set of circumstances that left him dead, but still able to see, hear, and feel everything around him. The story, shown entirely from Lou's point of view, involves a plot of greed, lust, and murder involving his best friend, Oscar Charles (John Lithgow), his ex-wife, Betty (Isabella Rossellini), and his lover, Erica (Sherilyn Fenn), in a morbid homage to classic film noir. Note: There are numerous references to Bogart's films and career, especially his famous line "Here's looking at you, kid", throughout the episode.

=== Season 7 (1996) ===
No. overall	No. in season	Title	Source	Directed by	Written by	Original release date
81	1	"Fatal Caper"	Tales from the Crypt #20	Bob Hoskins	Colman deKay and A. L. Katz & Gilbert Adler	April 19, 1996
Lord Mycroft Amberson (Leslie Phillips), a wealthy, elderly man with a weak heart, adds a stipulation to his will. The stipulation mentions that his two sons, the womanizing Justin (Greg Wise) and the greedy Evelyn (James Saxon) must locate their long-lost brother, Frank, within a certain amount of time, or else risk having their inheritance be given away to charity. Also starring Natasha Richardson and Bob Hoskins.
82	2	"Last Respects"	Tales from the Crypt #23	Freddie Francis	Scott Nimerfro	April 26, 1996
Yvonne (Emma Samms), Dolores (Kerry Fox), and Marlys Finger (Julie Cox) are three sisters who bicker with one another constantly. Left in charge of their late father's struggling curiosity shop, they discover a monkey's paw in a box of items. Thinking that they have found a way out of their financial troubles, Marlys and Yvonne use it to wish for riches. But their riches are not without tragic consequences.
83	3	"A Slight Case of Murder"	The Vault of Horror #33	Brian Helgeland	Brian Helgeland	May 3, 1996
Famous mystery novelist Sharon Bannister (Francesca Annis) is repeatedly pestered by her nosy neighbor Mrs. Trask (Elizabeth Spriggs), who wants advice to see if her own writing is any good as Sharon's. One day, Sharon is held at gunpoint by her jealous ex-husband Larry (Christopher Cazenove), who accuses her of cheating on him with Mrs. Trask's son, Joey (Patrick Barlow), leading to a suspenseful game of cat and mouse between all parties.
84	4	"Escape"	The Vault of Horror #16	Peter MacDonald	A. L. Katz & Gilbert Adler	May 17, 1996
During World War II, Lieutenant Luger (Martin Kemp), a German POW stuck in a British prison camp, leads an attempt to escape from the camp. When he and his companions are caught, Luger shamelessly rats out his fellow prisoners in exchange for additional privileges during incarceration. Learning that one of the men he betrayed is alive and in recovery, Luger attempts to silence him before another team of escapees he joins together with finds out about his treason.
85	5	"Horror in the Night"	The Vault of Horror #12	Russell Mulcahy	John Harrison	May 24, 1996
Jewel thief Nick Marvin (James Wilby) is double crossed by his partner, T (Ronan Vibert), and hides out in a nearby hotel after being shot in the shoulder. Once inside, Nick is haunted by many disturbing visions and occurrences inside the hotel, and is repeatedly visited by Laura (Elizabeth McGovern), a beautiful woman that only he can see who seems to have ulterior motives. Also starring Peter Guinness.
86	6	"Cold War"	Tales from the Crypt #43	Andy Morahan	Scott Nimerfro	May 31, 1996
Cammy (Jane Horrocks) and Ford (Ewan McGregor) are a loving couple who try to make a living as criminals in London. Their ineptitude with a life of crime leaves them trying to rob a bank that turns out to be abandoned, and then failing to rob a petrol station when a gang of bikers beat them to it. Having had enough of Ford's ineptitude and attitude towards her, Cammy decides to leave him. She meets the attractive Jimmy Pickett (Colin Salmon) in a bar and brings him home, but is soon reminded why she and Ford are perfect for each other.
87	7	"The Kidnapper"	Shock SuspenStories #12	James H. Spencer	John Harrison and Scott Nimerfro	June 7, 1996
Daniel Skeggs (Steve Coogan), a simple-minded and delusional pawn shop owner, meets Teresa (Julia Sawalha), a heavily pregnant homeless woman whom he takes in. Over time, the two begin developing a bond, but whereas Teresa only sees Daniel as a friend, Daniel falls in love with her. Daniel becomes insanely envious when Teresa's baby is born, so he sets out to get rid of the child in the hopes that Teresa will love him. When Teresa becomes too overwhelmed with emotion to respond to his advances, Daniel races to find the baby and return it to her.
88	8	"Report from the Grave"	The Vault of Horror #15	William Malone	William Malone	June 14, 1996
Elliot (James Frain), a paranormal researcher, invents a machine that is able to collect thoughts from the dead. Trying to read the thoughts of maniacal serial killer and hypnotist Valdemar Tymrak (Roger Ashton-Griffiths), Elliot turns the device far too high and ends up killing his girlfriend Arianne (Siobhan Flynn). Elliot becomes determined to resurrect Arianne at any cost, but discovers that Tymrak's ghost is working against him.
89	9	"Smoke Wrings"	The Vault of Horror #34	Mandie Fletcher	Lisa Sandoval	June 21, 1996
Advertising executive Jacqueline (Ute Lemper) ends up hiring Barry (Daniel Craig), an ex-convict, into her firm despite his lack of knowledge in advertising. Barry shows off a strange device he carries that is able to hypnotize people and plant suggestions into their heads, hoping to increase product sales. What Jacqueline doesn't know is that Barry, in exchange for not being sent back to jail, is in league with her enraged ex-partner Alistair Touchstone (Paul Freeman), who seeks revenge against her after she stole his company from him.
90	10	"About Face"	The Haunt of Fear #27	Thomas E. Sanders	Larry Wilson and A. L. Katz & Gilbert Adler	June 28, 1996
In Victorian England, Reverend Johnathan (Anthony Andrews), a corrupt and adulterous priest, discovers that he is the long-lost father of twin daughters: the beautiful and gentle Angelica and the angry and deformed Leah (Anna Friel in a double role). Deciding that having a family would be good for his image, Johnathan decides to adopt the girls as his own, but Leah, in a murderous rage, vows to kill their father for abandoning them. Also starring Imelda Staunton.
91	11	"Confession"	Shock SuspenStories #4	Peter Hewitt	Scott Nimerfro	July 5, 1996
A serial killer is on a rampage in a nearby city, decapitating women and taking their heads as trophies. Horror screenwriter Warhol Evans (Eddie Izzard) is labeled as the prime suspect when he is found washing his hands—presumably cleaning off the blood—near the latest crime scene. He is interrogated by famed detective Jack Lynch (Ciarán Hinds) who attempts to label him as the killer, but Evans does not go down without a fight, trying to turn the interrogation around. Also starring Alun Armstrong.
92	12	"Ear Today… Gone Tomorrow"	The Haunt of Fear #11	Christopher Hart	Ed Tapia	July 12, 1996
Glynn Fennell (Robert Lindsay), a gambling safecracker who suffers from impaired hearing after a beating in prison, finds himself getting entangled in a deadly game between crime boss Malcom Lawson (Richard Johnson) and his exotic wife, Kate (Gretchen Palmer), who turn out to implant animal features into human bodies in an effort to boost his subordinates' abilities. Eventually, Glynn is given the auditory system of an owl, but Glynn's new condition soon displays some unusual side effects.
93	13	"The Third Pig"	"The Three Little Pigs"	Bill Kopp and Pat Ventura	Bill Kopp	July 19, 1996
In an animated edition of "The Three Little Pigs", narrated by the Cryptkeeper himself, the Big Bad Wolf (voiced by Bobcat Goldthwait) slaughters Drinky Pig (voiced by Brad Garrett) and Smokey Pig (voiced by Charlie Adler), leaving the third pig, Dudley (voiced by Cam Clarke), accused of the murders and found guilty by a rigged jury of wolves. With the ghosts of his dead brothers helping him escape, Dudley plans to take revenge on the Big Bad Wolf by using a laboratory once owned by a mad scientist to create a zombie pig (also voiced by Brad Garrett). Other characters are played by Corey Burton and Jim Cummings. Note: This is the only animated episode in the series. Its animation was provided by Nelvana, who also produced the animated spin-off Tales from the Cryptkeeper.

== Films ==
1. Tales from the Crypt Presents: Demon Knight
2. Tales from the Crypt Presents: Bordello of Blood
3. Tales from the Crypt Presents: Ritual
