= Hard Time on Planet Earth =

1989 television series

- Intertitle
- Genre: Science fiction
- Created by: Jim Thomas; John Thomas
- Starring: Martin Kove
- Voices of: Danny Mann
- Composer: Joseph Conlan
- Country of origin: United States
- Original language: English
- No. of seasons: 1
- No. of episodes: 13

Production
- Executive producers: Richard Chapman; E. Jack Kaplan; Jim Thomas; John Thomas
- Producers: Janice Cooke-Leonard; Michael Piller; Ric Rondell
- Cinematography: Fred J. Koenekamp
- Running time: 44 minutes
- Production companies: Demos-Bard/Shanachie Productions; Touchstone Television

Original release
- Network: CBS
- Release: March 1 – June 21, 1989

Hard Time on Planet Earth is an American science fiction television series that aired on CBS as a midseason replacement from March 1 to June 21, 1989. Airing for 13 episodes, the series starred Martin Kove; it was created by Jim and John Thomas, whose previous collaborations include The Rescue as well as the Predator franchise. Scheduled opposite NBC's Unsolved Mysteries and ABC's Growing Pains on Wednesdays, Hard Time on Planet Earth ranked 65th out of 81 programs upon its premiere. Ratings for the series never improved, and CBS canceled the series in May 1989.

== Synopsis ==
The main character was an alien Elite Military Officer (Kove) who served in a huge interplanetary war. After the war ended, he was prosecuted for a rebellion against the planet's ruling Council; he was found guilty, but in recognition of his valuable services in the war, he was given the chance to reform by spending an undetermined amount of time in a vastly underpowered human form on planet Earth.

Along with him was dispatched Control (voiced by Danny Mann), a small floating robot in the form of a mechanical eye with the mission of overseeing Jesse (the earthly name adopted by the alien warrior, from the name tag on the first Earth clothes he wore) to make sure Jesse kept his violent behavior in check. Control also provided comic relief to the series, usually by assessing the events with the catchphrase "Negative outcome. Not good."

Each episode followed Jesse as he reluctantly helped different people in need. He derives much of his information from television shows, giving him a skewed sense of Earth culture. At first, Jesse only helped those in need to earn Control's approval in order to put an end to his exile, but he slowly became fond of the goodness he encountered from some of Earth's people.

== Reception ==
Most critics detested the series. According to People magazine, "About 20,000 RPM—that's how fast I reckon Walt Disney must be spinning in his grave with shows like this on the air … It is just one long, bad commercial."

== Episodes ==
No.	Title	Directed by	Written by	Original release date	U.S. viewers (millions)
1	"Stranger in a Strange Land"	Robert Mandel	Jim Thomas & John Thomas	March 1, 1989	13.0
The alien, who takes on the earthly name Jesse (Martin Kove), arrives on Earth. He steals some clothes from an empty gas station and watches some television to learn about Earth's culture. The police notice him there and, confused by his actions, open fire on him. Jesse escapes by stealing a truck and driving away. But in the process he loses a crystal which grants him above-average powers. The police eventually corner him on the Vincent Thomas Bridge, so he jumps. In violation of his programming, Control rescues him. Later, in Los Angeles, Jesse witnesses the robbery of a jewelry store and intervenes. He has realized that the only way to leave Earth is to obey his charge: to help the people of this planet.
2	"Something to Bank On"	Roger Duchowny	Richard Chapman & E. Jack Kaplan	March 8, 1989	14.7
Jesse finds himself in need of money. Control discovers that ATMs dispense money, so he empties several and Jesse takes the money. However, a woman witnesses him doing so and reports him to the police. He acquires a hotel room, and soon after, a grifter approaches him with a sob story. Jesse willingly gives him $50,000. Later Jesse sees a news report about the ATM robberies and realizes that he has done wrong. He takes the money back to the bank, where he is arrested. The police grill him about the missing $50,000. Eventually he becomes frustrated and breaks out of jail. With the help of the jail psychologist (Jamie Rose), Jesse recovers the money and returns it. But despite her pleas, he refuses to remand himself back into police custody.
3	"Losing Control"	Michael Lange	Bruce Cervi	March 15, 1989	12.7
Jesse and Control go to Disneyland. While there, Control tries to play several arcade games at once and short circuits. A child finds the unconscious Control and takes him home. When the police prove unwilling to help, Jesse enlists the help of a female reporter. The child's father investigates Control's strange properties using a computer. Eventually the U.S. government gets involved over fears that Control is part of some sort of nuclear warfare. The child receives a message from Control about Jesse and runs away to try to find him, but is caught by his father and the police. Jesse sneaks into the government lab where they are experimenting on Control and rescues him. He takes Control back to Disneyland, where he uses the electricity from the arcade games to revive him. A police desk officer is portrayed by Ken Jenkins.
4	"The Way Home"	Timothy Bond	Michael Piller	March 22, 1989	14.2
Jesse defends an old man from some local toughs and is rewarded with a job mowing lawns. He meets a young girl (Darcy Marta) who has been kicked out of her parents' house in an attempt to show her "tough love". Jesse soon learns that she is involved in a criminal teen subculture where two crooked police officers help the kids rob from rich people. Jesse sees that she's in over her head. He tries to mediate between her and her parents so that she can come home, but she's still unwilling to abide by their rules. Angered by her parents' refusal to loosen their rules, the girl informs the corrupt policemen that her father is carrying industrial-grade diamonds. Jesse, bearing a peace offering from her parents, finds the young girl and she realizes what she's done. Jesse intervenes, saving the family and the diamonds, and helping to catch the corrupt officers.
5	"All That You Can Be"	Roger Duchowny	Bruce Cervi & Nicholas Corea	March 29, 1989	15.4
Unable to find a job anywhere else, Jesse joins the United States Army. Control has misgivings, but agrees so that he'll have something positive to report. The recruiter, Sergeant Striker (Marshall Bell), eager to take some time off, fabricates a false history for Jesse and assigns him to take his place at Fort Drake. To help Jesse acclimate more quickly, Control shows him videos of John Wayne, whom he identifies as an ideal warrior within Earth culture. At Fort Drake, Jesse is put in charge of the under-performing Bravo Team. He inspires the Bravos to perform better as soldiers and as a unit. When Corporal Curtis Tillman (Larry B. Scott) runs into trouble with his old street gang, the Striders, Jesse intervenes. In the midst of a military exercise, the Striders break into Fort Drake with Tillman's help in order to steal weapons. Jesse diverts Bravo Team and saves the day. At the end of the episode, he is given an honorable discharge. Note: This episode marks a mini Cobra Kai reunion between Martin Kove and Larry B. Scott, who portrayed Sensei John Kreese and student Jerry Robertson, respectively.
6	"Battle of the Sexes"	Michael Lange	Bruce Cervi	April 5, 1989	12.3
An extraterrestrial from Jesse's world, sent to assassinate him, arrives on Earth and takes the form of a female human being (Sandahl Bergman). Meanwhile, Jesse is working at a diner. The owner (Paul Comi) is falling on hard times, but is unwilling to take advice from his daughter (Lycia Naff). And the owner's son (Mark Thomas Miller), whom he intends to take over the restaurant, would rather pursue a career in music. The daughter discovers that the sons of her father's business associate are cheating them and they get into a fight with Jesse over it. Later Jesse meets the assassin at a club and they have a few dates. The sons of the father's business associate bring a gang and attack Jesse, but he defeats them. The father's business associate (Al Ruscio) discovers his sons' misdeeds and rectifies the situation, validating the daughter. Jesse discovers the assassin's identity and defeats it using electricity from plasma globes he noticed earlier that week at a planetarium.
7	"Death Do Us Part"	Charles Correll	Michael Piller & Ed Zuckerman	April 12, 1989	12.1
Jesse appears on The All New Dating Game and is chosen by the contestant, Jane (Lise Hilboldt). They go on a date funded by the game show. Jesse wants to avoid a commitment and worries about how to end the date, but Jane admits that she's already met someone else, named Michael (Tim Dunigan). She states her intention to find someone for Jesse and takes him back to her apartment to pick up her copy of Matchmaker Magazine. Two thieves (one of whom is Michael) are in her apartment and Jesse rescues her, but the thieves escape. Michael continues dating Jane hoping to marry her and get her trust fund. He and Jane try to set Jesse up on dates, with little success. Jesse spots Michael on a date with another woman and tries to warn Jane, but she ignores him. Michael plants evidence implicating Jesse at the scene of their next burglary. At Michael and Jane's wedding, the police attempt to arrest Jesse but he escapes. He finds Michael and Jane on their honeymoon. Michael tries to kill Jane and make it look like Jesse did it, but Jesse foils the plan and rescues Jane.
8	"The Hot Dog Man"	James A. Contner	Rob Ulin	April 26, 1989	10.4
Jesse gets a job as a hot dog man at a local wrestling ring. When he witnesses what he thinks is an unfair fight, he enters the ring and defeats the other four wrestlers. The owners of the ring, Annie (Conchata Ferrell) and Sandra (Pamela Cummings), hire him and promote him as the Hotdog Man, and Jesse begins to learn the concept of sports. Meanwhile, a local businessman is trying to buy the property where the ring is located. Annie and Sandra are unwilling to sell because the ring generates money to support a halfway house on the same property. Some thugs try to intimidate Jesse by mugging him in a back alley with a baseball bat and then by causing a light bank to fall on the ring during a televised match. Jesse confronts the businessman about it, only to learn that he's not involved. When a man, Jake (Richard Epcar) comes to get Annie's signature to sell the lease, the wrestlers attack him and he confesses that Sandra is behind everything. Sandra takes one of the children from the halfway house hostage, but Jesse and the other wrestlers use their unique skills to rescue him.
9	"Jesse's Fifteen Minutes"	Bill Corcoran	Michael Eric Stein	May 3, 1989	11.1
Jesse uses a fire hydrant to rescue a woman, Donna (Rebecca Staab), who is a model, being carjacked. She takes him to a party where they photograph him as a joke, but he ends up getting a job as a model. Thus he is introduced to the concepts of fashion and advertising. Jesse's ascension angers another model, Zack (Brad Lockerman), who is trying to make a comeback. Some goons try, unsuccessfully, to take Jesse's life. Jesse investigates by breaking into Zack's apartment and discovers photographic evidence that Zack is blackmailing Fred (Sandy Simpson), the man who murdered Donna's brother and stole his designs. Fred sends four men to kill Jesse and Donna, but Jesse thwarts them and goes on to catch Fred and Zack.
10	"Rodeo"	Michael Lange	David Percelay & Van Gordon Sauter	May 10, 1989	9.6
After helping to stop a runaway stagecoach at a cowboy-themed car dealership, Jesse gets a job cleaning stables at a local rodeo. He rides a bronco and gets in a barfight. One of the cowboys, Travis (Grainger Hines), is getting old and doesn't feel like he can perform, anymore, so he quits and takes a job at the car dealership. Travis and Jesse discover that the owner, Buck (Michael Alldredge), has been stealing cars with a tow truck and selling them. Travis confronts Buck and accusing him of being no different than a horse thief. Buck tries to escape, but Jesse and Travis chase him down and Jesse lassos him.
11	"Not in Our Stars"	Al Waxman	Rob Swigart	May 31, 1989	9.9
The episode starts with Jesse running through swamps and forests while being chased and shot at by a SWAT team. Jesse is picked up by a spaceship, where it is revealed that it was Jesse's vice commander who ordered the assassination of the Grand Elder, not Jesse. Then Jesse wakes up on a bus to learn that it was only a dream. Control ridicules Jesse for believing his dream and is unable to contact the Council, so Jesse investigates on his own. He seeks out a university professor who is working on communicating with extraterrestrials. Jesse designs a microchip that will make possible faster-than-light communication so that he can use their radio telescope to try to contact the Council. The professor and a security team try to take the chip. When Jesse resists, he is shot and eventually captured. Jesse wakes up in a hospital and flees. He manages to recover the chip before the professor can use it—Earth is not ready for contact with extraterrestrials. Rather than risk it being used, Jesse destroys the chip, giving up his chance for absolution.
12	"The All American"	Roger Duchowny	Michael Piller	June 14, 1989	10.8
When a woman falls in front of a bus, Jesse rushes to help, but a high school student, Bill (Doug Johnson), gets there first and pushes the bus out of the way. Jesse follows him to the high school, where he takes a job as a substitute teacher. When one of Bill's friends nearly falls off the high school building, Jesse rescues him, revealing his powers to Bill in the process. Bill admits that he was part of a coup from within the Council and that he was placed on Earth eighteen years ago in the body of an infant. Billy's Control and Jesse's Control try to prevent them from having contact with each other. Bill plans to go to Harvard, become a lawyer, and eventually become the President of the United States. When Bill resorts to violence to further these ends, Jesse breaks ties with him, so Bill frames him. Jesse escapes from the police and fights with Bill. He convinces Bill to give up his ambition and when he does, Bill passes his final test and is taken home.
13	"Wally's Gang"	Ric Rondell	Richard Chapman & E. Jack Kaplan	June 21, 1989	8.8
After twenty-five years of running his own children's program, Wally (Gordon Jump) is given his two-weeks' notice. Devastated, he tries to commit suicide by jumping from the building, but Jesse intervenes. Consequently, Jesse gets a job on the show. One of the features on the show is a wishing well, which Jesse takes literally. When one of the kids, Timmy (Brandon Bluhm), writes in a wish that his father will be protected from being murdered, Jesse and Wally decide to investigate. Jesse finds Timmy's dad in witness protection but, misunderstanding, attacks the marshals and Timmy's dad runs away. Jesse and Wally find Timmy's dad, again, but this time they've been followed by the Mob. Jesse prevents them from kidnapping Timmy's father and hands them over to the police. At the end it is implied that Jesse has fulfilled his directive and may now return home.
