= Mission to Mars =

2000 film by Brian De Palma

- Theatrical release poster
- Directed by: Brian De Palma
- Screenplay by: Jim Thomas; John Thomas; Graham Yost
- Story by: Jim Thomas; John Thomas; Lowell Cannon
- Based on: Walt Disney's Mission to Mars
- Produced by: Tom Jacobson
- Starring: Gary Sinise; Don Cheadle; Connie Nielsen; Jerry O'Connell; Kim Delaney; Tim Robbins
- Cinematography: Stephen H. Burum
- Edited by: Paul Hirsch
- Music by: Ennio Morricone
- Production companies: Touchstone Pictures; The Jacobson Company
- Distributed by: Buena Vista Pictures Distribution (United States and Canada); Spyglass Entertainment (select territories); Buena Vista International (International)
- Release date: March 10, 2000
- Running time: 114 minutes
- Country: United States
- Language: English
- Budget: $90–100 million
- Box office: $111 million

Mission to Mars is a 2000 American science fiction adventure film directed by Brian De Palma, written by Jim and John Thomas and Graham Yost, and suggested by Disney's theme park attraction of the same name.

The film depicts the first crewed Mars exploration mission going awry; American astronaut Jim McConnell (Gary Sinise) helps to coordinate a rescue mission for a colleague. The film also stars Tim Robbins, Don Cheadle, Connie Nielsen, Jerry O'Connell and Kim Delaney. Released theatrically by Buena Vista Pictures Distribution through Touchstone Pictures on March 10, 2000, the film was both a critical and commercial disappointment.

== Plot ==
In 2020, the Mars I mission travels to the planet Mars, commanded by Luke Graham. The team discovers a bright white formation in the Cydonia region, which they suspect is an extrusion from a subsurface geothermal column of water, useful to future human colonization. After reporting this to the Earth-orbiting World Space Station, they investigate the formation and start hearing a low sound on their communications system. Their radar reports the formation is metal, but when they increase its power, a vortex kills everyone except Luke and the formation is revealed to be part of a large humanoid face.

The space station observes an electromagnetic pulse and receives a distress message from Luke. Realizing the pulse damaged the computer system of the Earth Return Vehicle (ERV) they repurpose the Mars II mission into a rescue.

Mars Rescue, consisting of Commander Woody Blake, his wife Terri Fisher, recent widower Jim McConnell and technician Phil Ohlmyer, approaches Mars orbit months later to find all satellite imagery of the formation area covered with static. Micrometeoroids breach the ship, damage the fuel lines, and detonate the engines. The crew abandons their disabled Mars II ship and travel to the Resupply Module in orbit nearby. Woody loses his tether to the module and begins descending into the atmosphere. When Terri risks her own safety to attempt to rescue him, he removes his helmet, killing himself to save her.

The survivors arrive on the surface and find Luke living in a greenhouse. He shows them pictures of the face, and reveals the pulses represent a 3D model of human-like DNA missing a pair of chromosomes. Jim determines they must complete the sequence to pass a test. When they send a rover to broadcast the completed signal, an opening appears in the side of the structure. With a massive dust storm approaching Jim, Terri, and Luke head to the formation, while Phil stays to finish repairing the ERV. Phil is ordered to launch, with or without them, before the storm hits.

The three astronauts enter the opening, which seals behind them. A three-dimensional projection of the Solar System depicts Mars, covered with water, being struck by a large asteroid and rendered uninhabitable. A projection of a humanoid Martian lifeform reveals the native Martians evacuated the planet in spaceships, one of which was sent to seed Earth with DNA to create life that could one day land on Mars and be recognized as descendants. An invitation is offered for one of their group to follow the Martians to their new home. Jim accepts the invitation and is sealed inside a small capsule. Terri and Luke arrive back to the ERV just as Phil is about to take off. They barely escape the dust storm into space as Jim's capsule is launched from the crumbling formation and flies past them toward the Martians' home.

== Cast ==
- Gary Sinise as Jim McConnell
- Tim Robbins as Woody Blake
- Don Cheadle as Luke Graham
- Connie Nielsen as Terri Fisher
- Jerry O'Connell as Phil Ohlmyer
- Kim Delaney as Maggie McConnell
- Elise Neal as Debra Graham
- Peter Outerbridge as Sergei Kirov
- Jill Teed as Renée Coté
- Kavan Smith as Nicholas Willis
- Robert Bailey Jr. as Bobby Graham
- Taylor Jones as Daniel Lederman
- Armin Mueller-Stahl as Ray Beck
- Bill Timoney as Computer (voice)

== Production ==
The film was shot primarily on location in Vancouver, British Columbia, Jordan and the Canary Islands. Mission to Mars explores astronomy, extraterrestrial life and space exploration. Extensive special effects surrounding certain aspects of the film such as the NASA spacecraft and Martian vortex, were created by a number of digital effects companies including ILM, Dream Quest Images, Tippett Studio, CIS Hollywood and Trans FX. Between visuals, miniatures, and animation, over 400 technicians were directly involved in the production aspects of the special effects.

According to the director in the 2015 documentary film about his career, Brian De Palma was brought on board after the previous director Gore Verbinski walked away due to concerns over the lack of additional money for the budget. De Palma indicated that the film needed additional funds and that much of the budget went into the CGI for the film. When De Palma was hired the script had already been written and the film cast.

== Soundtrack ==
Mission to Mars: Original Score

Film score by Ennio Morricone
- Released: March 14, 2000
- Genre: Orchestral
- Length: 62:11
- Label: Hollywood

The original score for Mission to Mars, was released by the Hollywood Records music label on March 14, 2000. The score for the film was composed by Ennio Morricone and performed by the New York Philharmonic. Suzana Peric and Nick Meyers edited the film's music.

== Reception ==
=== Release ===
The film, produced by Disney's Touchstone Pictures, was distributed by Buena Vista Pictures in North America and most territories, while Spyglass Entertainment handled select European sales through its distribution partners. C+P, a joint-venture between Canal+ and Pathé, acquired distribution rights in France, while Spyglass' usual international partners, KirchMedia (Germany, Italy, Spain, Poland, ex-USSR), Svensk Filmindustri (Scandivania) and Lusomundo (Portugal) acquired rights in those specific territories.

=== Critical response ===
Among mainstream critics in the United States, the film received mainly negative reviews. Rotten Tomatoes reported that 24% of 113 sampled critics gave the film a positive review, with an average score of 4.6/10 and the consensus, "Beauty only goes skin deep in this shallow but visually stunning film." At Metacritic, which assigns a weighted average out of 100 to critics' reviews, the film received a score of 34 based on 36 reviews. Furthermore, the film was nominated for a Golden Raspberry Award for Worst Director for De Palma, where he lost to Roger Christian for Battlefield Earth at the 21st Golden Raspberry Awards. Audiences surveyed by CinemaScore gave the film a grade "C−" on a scale of A to F.

The film's reception among French-language critics was markedly different in positive fashion. Film journal Cahiers du Cinéma devoted several articles to De Palma and Mission to Mars at the time of its release, and placed it as #4 in their list of the 10 best films of 2000. The film was screened out of competition at the 2000 Cannes Film Festival.

Sinise and Robbins, a couple of awfully good actors, are asked to speak some awfully clunky lines. When Robbins says, "OK, we're ready to light this candle" before ignition, it sounds like a parody of astronaut lingo.

— Bob Graham, writing in the San Francisco Chronicle

Mark Halverson, writing in Sacramento News & Review, said "My inner child felt cheated that the film leapt from an astronaut barbecue to Mars without so much as a rocket launch and that the best special effect (a sandstorm nod to The Mummy) was unveiled in the first 20 minutes." He added, "This visually alluring mess also includes gobs of cheesy dialogue and a hokey-looking alien." Left unimpressed, Bob Graham in the San Francisco Chronicle, wrote that the film "meanders into space-mystico mumbo jumbo. We're supposed to share the characters' awe at the wonder of the universe, but more likely the audience will wonder whatever were the filmmakers thinking." Graham characterized Mission to Mars as "a very mixed bag: rhapsodic cinematography, several genuine shocks amid a suffocating air of gooeyness, impressive visual effects – even if some seem to exist in a vacuum – and an absolutely loony conclusion." Roger Ebert of the Chicago Sun-Times, said the film "contains conversations that drag on beyond all reason. It is quiet when quiet is not called for. It contains actions that deny common sense. And for long stretches the characters speak nothing but boilerplate". He believed that "It misses too many of its marks. But it has extraordinary things in it. It's as if the director, the gifted Brian De Palma, rises to the occasions but the screenplay gives him nothing much to do in between them." The film however, was not without its supporters. Michael Wilmington of the New York Daily News, exclaimed the film was "One of the most gorgeous science-fiction movies ever – and probably also one of the most realistic in detail and scientific extrapolation". Richard Corliss of TIME commented that "This isn't 2001, by a long shot, but for 2000, it'll do nicely". William Arnold of the Seattle Post-Intelligencer, added to the positive sentiment by saying "Here and there an inspired shot makes the film come alive, and at least three of its sequences had me positioned well on the edge of my seat."

Writing for The Austin Chronicle, Marc Savlov noted that the "Mission to Mars falls prey to an overwhelming sense of a man trying to please everyone all the time." He went further, that "De Palma has reached out to embrace a larger audience and seemingly sacrificed those traits that drew us to him in the first place: his singular vision, his clinical stylistics, and the palpable sense of dread that his best films engender." In a mixed review, James Berardinelli writing for ReelViews, called the film "Ineptly directed, badly acted, and scripted with an eye towards stupidity and incoherence, the film is worthwhile only to those who are in desperate need of a nap. And, as is often the case when a big budget, high profile motion picture self-destructs, this one does so in spectacular fashion." Describing a mixed opinion, J. Hoberman of The Village Voice said the film encompassed "a touchy-feely esprit that's predicated on equal parts Buck Rogers bravado and backyard barbecue, the whole burnt burger drenched in Ennio Morricone's elegiac western-style score".

Unfortunately, the filmmakers' imagination flags in the closing sequences; the movie's final reel looks like a high-tech museum exhibit entitled "2001: A Space Odyssey for Dummies".

— Margaret A. McGurk, writing for The Cincinnati Enquirer

Elvis Mitchell of The New York Times, stated that the "visual design is spectacular, and the scenes on the Martian surface look so real that the picture could have been made on location. A holographic sequence detailing the evolutionary link between Earth and Mars is staggeringly well staged." However, he ultimately came to the conclusion that there wasn't "an original moment in the entire movie, and the score is so repetitive that it could have been downloaded directly from EnnioMorricone.com." Similarly, Todd McCarthy wrote in Variety that the film's "dramatic package that it arrives in is so flimsy, unconvincing and poorly wrought that it's impossible to be swept away by the illustrated version of creationism on offer." He did note "Pictorially, the film is smooth and pristine looking. De Palma and his frequent cinematographer Stephen H. Burum go for their patented swooping and twisting camera moves whenever possible, and there are some very nice ones onboard the recovery ship." Lisa Schwarzbaum writing for Entertainment Weekly deduced that "Mission to Mars wants us to think about lofty things: the bravery of explorers, the ingenuity of our nation's space program, the humility required to comprehend the possibility that we earthlings are not the be-all and end-all of creation. But De Palma's film is too embarrassed, too jittery and self-conscious to hush up and pay attention."

A student-written and sharply negative Daily Eastern News review of Mission to Mars negatively assessed the screenwriters' overall contribution to the film industry, stating that they had "come to the conclusion that Jim and John Thomas should never be allowed to write a screenplay ever again."

=== Box office ===
The film premiered in cinemas on March 10, 2000, in wide release throughout the U.S. During its opening weekend, the film opened in first place, grossing $22,855,247 in business showing at 3,054 locations. It earned the third-highest March opening weekend at that time, behind Teenage Mutant Ninja Turtles and Liar Liar. The film The Ninth Gate came in second place during that weekend grossing $6,622,518. The film's revenue dropped by 50% in its second week of release, earning $11,385,709. For that particular weekend, the film fell to second place screening in 3,060 theaters. Erin Brockovich unseated Mission to Mars to open in first place, grossing $28,138,465 in box office revenue. During its final weekend in release, it opened in a distant 72nd place with $17,467 in revenue. The film went on to top out domestically at $60,883,407 in total ticket sales through an 18-week theatrical run. The film took in an additional $50,100,000 in business through international release to top out at a combined $110,983,407 in gross revenue. The film ranked 41st at the box office for 2000.

== Home media ==
Mission to Mars was released on VHS and DVD on September 12, 2000. The film was later released on Blu-ray in France on September 22, 2009.

== See also ==
- List of films set on Mars
- List of films featuring space stations
- List of films featuring extraterrestrials
- Mars in fiction

== Bibliography ==
- Schochet, Stephen (2010). Hollywood Stories: Short, Entertaining Anecdotes about the Stars and Legends of the Movies!. BCH Fulfillment & Distribution. ISBN 978-0-9638972-7-5.
- Badmington, Neil (2004). Alien Chic: Posthumanism and the Other Within. Routledge. ISBN 978-0-415-31023-9.
- Lathers, Marie (2010). Space Oddities: Women and Outer Space in Popular Film and Culture, 1960-2000. Continuum. ISBN 978-1-4411-9049-9.
- Urbanek, Zuzana (2009). A Book Full of Movies: You May Not Have Seen. CreateSpace. ISBN 978-1-4499-3068-4.
- Leviton, Richard (2004). The Emerald Modem: A User's Guide to Earth's Interactive Energy Body. Hampton Roads. ISBN 978-1-57174-245-2.
- McCracken, Grant (2008). Transformations: Identity Construction in Contemporary Culture. Indiana University Press. ISBN 978-0-253-21957-2.
- Daugherty, John (2004). Exploration: Themes of Science Fiction, A Brief Guide. Trafford Publishing. ISBN 978-1-4120-1330-7.
- Harris, Paola (2008). Connecting the Dots...: Making Sense of the UFO Phenomenon. AuthorHouse. ISBN 978-1-4343-7178-2.
- Westfahl, Gary (2009). Islands in the Sky: The Space Station Theme in Science Fiction Literature. Borgo Press. ISBN 978-1-4344-0356-8.
- Gierke, Christian (2001). Der digitale Film. Books on Demand GmbH. ISBN 978-3-8311-1509-9.
- Lippe, Jonathan (2007). Simulation Theory. Xlibris Corporation. ISBN 978-1-4257-7445-5.
- Joubert, Bernard (2006). Histoires de censure. Musardine (La). ISBN 978-2-84271-313-3.
- Flieger, Jerry (2005). Is Oedipus Online?: Siting Freud after Freud. The MIT Press. ISBN 978-0-262-56207-2.
- McClean, Shilo (2008). Digital Storytelling: The Narrative Power of Visual Effects in Film. The MIT Press. ISBN 978-0-262-63369-7.
- Rickman, Gregg (2004). The Science Fiction Film Reader. Limelight Editions. ISBN 978-0-87910-994-3.
- Seewood, Andre (2008). Slave Cinema: The Crisis of the African-American in Film. Xlibris, Corp. ISBN 978-1-4363-2179-2.
- Keegan, Rebecca (2010). The Futurist: The Life and Films of James Cameron. Three Rivers Press. ISBN 978-0-307-46032-5.
