= Cold Dog Soup (film) =

1990 American film

- Directed by: Alan Metter
- Written by: Thomas Pope
- Based on: Cold Dog Soup by Stephen Dobyns
- Produced by: Thomas Pope; Richard Gilbert Abramson
- Starring: Randy Quaid; Frank Whaley; Christine Harnos; Sheree North; Nancy Kwan
- Cinematography: Frederick Elmes
- Edited by: Kaja Fehr
- Music by: Michael Kamen
- Production companies: Aspen Film Society; HandMade Films
- Distributed by: Anchor Bay Entertainment
- Release date: September 6, 1990 (Australia)
- Running time: 87 minutes
- Country: United States
- Language: English
- Budget: $10 million
- Box office: £603 (UK)

Cold Dog Soup is a 1990 American comedy film directed by Alan Metter. It is based on the novel Cold Dog Soup by Stephen Dobyns.

It was one of the last movies from HandMade Films.

== Plot ==
In Los Angeles, Michael (Frank Whaley) meets Sarah (Christine Harnos) at the gym. She invites him to dinner at the apartment she shares with her mother (Sheree North) and their dog Jasper. While the three of them are at the table eating dinner, Jasper dies suddenly. Sarah's mother insists that Michael bury Jasper in the park, along with a bag of Jasper's belongings- such as a ball, a blanket, a bowl, and a squeaky toy.

Michael takes the dog (in a garbage bag) and gets into a taxi. The deranged driver (Randy Quaid) insists that they sell the dead dog's body and they spend the night driving around the city, selling off the dog's belongings one by one. Eventually Sarah joins them, and she too is eager to sell the dead dog. They go to a fur coat maker, a hot dog restaurant surrounded by homeless people, a Chinese restaurant, they are confronted by a gang, and they attend a voodoo ceremony to talk to the dog's spirit. Eventually Michael and Sarah split up from the cab driver and they get into an argument on the street in front of a nightclub run by drag queen twins. Michael decides he is no longer interested in Sarah, and they go their separate ways.

The next morning, Michael starts burying Jasper in the park, only to have the cab driver show up again, and steal the dog's corpse. Michael then notices another man burying a dead dog in the park. He tells the man that he can sell the dead dog, and the movie ends.

== Cast ==
- Frank Whaley
- Randy Quaid
- Sheree North

== Original Novel ==
The novel was published in 1985. The San Fransciso Examiner called it "a bizarre and outrageous work." "I found it a bore," wrote Winston Groom in the Los Angeles Times.

== Production ==
In November 1986 it was announced Sam Kinison would appear in a film version of the novel, to be directed by Alan Metter for Orion Pictures. This would be the first of a three picture deal Kinison signed with Orion following their successful collaboration on Back to School, directed by Alan Metter. "It's really off the wall," said Kinison. "It's one of the most bizarre comedies I've ever read."

Orion and Kinison dropped out (Orion would file for bankruptcy in 1991). The film ended up being financed by Britain's HandMade Films. Shooting started in Los Angeles in January 1989. Filming ended by April and the movie was to be released in October 1989 by Paramount.

== Release ==
The movie does not appear to have been theatrically released in the US but it received an arthouse release in Australia in 1990 and was released in UK cinemas in 1991.

== Reception ==
The Daily Telegraph called it "a dog's breakfast."

Sight and Sound called it "quite possibly the worst film ever made."

Variety wrote "For about half its length Cold Dog Soup shapes up as an enjoyably weird variation on After Hours but inspiration flags in the second half making pic a dubious commercial proposition."

In a negative review for the film, timeout.com wrote that "no stone is left unturned by Thomas Pope's horribly repetitive script, or by Alan Metter in his drivelling attempt to create a surreal comic nightmare."

== Lawsuit ==
In January 1995 George Harrison lodged a lawsuit against his partner in HandMade Films, Denis O'Brien. Harrison contended that O'Brien backed out of a 1978 agreement to cover half the losses of HandMade Films. In January 1996 a judge awarded Harrison $11 million in damages, being half the amount of debt over a soured deal for Cold Dog Soup. In February 1998 the California Court of Appeal confirmed this judgement. O'Brien declared bankruptcy in 2000.
