= Executive Decision =

1996 American action film by Stuart Baird

- Theatrical release poster
- Directed by: Stuart Baird
- Written by: Jim Thomas; John Thomas
- Produced by: Joel Silver; Jim Thomas; John Thomas
- Starring: Kurt Russell; Halle Berry; John Leguizamo; Oliver Platt; Joe Morton; David Suchet; Steven Seagal
- Cinematography: Alex Thomson
- Edited by: Stuart Baird; Kevin Stitt; Frank J. Urioste
- Music by: Jerry Goldsmith
- Production company: Silver Pictures
- Distributed by: Warner Bros.
- Release date: March 15, 1996
- Running time: 133 minutes
- Country: United States
- Languages: English; Arabic
- Budget: $55 million
- Box office: $122.1 million

Executive Decision is a 1996 American action thriller film directed by Stuart Baird (in his directorial debut) and written by Jim Thomas and John Thomas, who also produced the film with Joel Silver. It stars Kurt Russell, Steven Seagal, Halle Berry, John Leguizamo, Oliver Platt, Joe Morton, David Suchet and B.D. Wong.

It depicts the rescue of an airliner hijacked by terrorists. An elite team boards the plane in mid-flight, but its leader (played by Seagal) is killed early in the mission, requiring an intelligence consultant (played by Russell) to take over and finish the job.

The film was released in the United States on March 15, 1996, by Warner Bros., grossing $122.1 million against a $55 million budget.

== Plot ==
In May 1995, Lieutenant Colonel Austin Travis leads an unsuccessful Special Forces black ops raid on a Chechen mafia safe house in Trieste, Italy, to recover a stolen Soviet nerve agent, DZ-5. Three months later, Oceanic Airlines Flight 343, a Boeing 747-200B, leaves Athens bound for Washington, D.C., with more than 400 passengers aboard including Nagi Hassan, lieutenant of the imprisoned terrorist leader El Sayed Jaffa. Hassan and his men hijack the flight, demanding Jaffa's release. Just moments before the hijacking, a suicide bomber working for Jaffa destroys a London Marriott hotel restaurant.

Dr. David Grant, a U.S. Army intelligence consultant involved in the botched raid, is summoned to a meeting at the Pentagon to plan an operation to retake the plane. Grant doubts Hassan's demands, suspecting he engineered Jaffa's capture and intends to use the 747 to detonate a bomb loaded with the DZ-5 in U.S. airspace. The Pentagon authorizes a mid-air insertion of Travis' special operations team into the hijacked airliner using the experimental "Remora F117x" aircraft. Grant and DARPA engineer Dennis Cahill reluctantly join the mission.

The Remora intercepts and docks with the airliner. Grant, Cahill, and team members Cappy, Baker, Louie, and Rat successfully board, but Cappy is injured after a fall. Severe turbulence strains the docking tunnel. Travis sacrifices himself by closing the 747's hatch before it decompresses. The Remora is destroyed along with two other team members still on board and their communications equipment, leaving the Pentagon unaware of the boarding party's survival. They conduct a covert search for the bomb, aiming to neutralize it before storming the cabin. Grant accidentally reveals his presence to flight attendant Jean and successfully recruits her to assist their search, despite Hassan's suspicions.

The team locates the bomb. Cappy, despite his injuries, guides Cahill in disarming it until they discover its arming device has an additional, remote-controlled trigger. Jaffa, released by U.S. officials in an attempt to resolve the situation, calls Hassan from a private jet to tell him he is on his way to Algeria, but Hassan abruptly ends the call. Grant and the others realize Hassan's men are unaware of the bomb and Hassan's true intentions after he kills one of them for rebuking him. He also inadvertently reveals that one of the passengers is a sleeper agent and the trigger-man for the bomb.

The Pentagon dispatches U.S. Navy F-14 Tomcats to shoot down the 747, prompting Hassan to execute passenger U.S. Senator Jason Mavros as a warning. Baker uses Morse code via the 747's taillights to signal the fighters that the team made it aboard, requesting an extra ten minutes to neutralize the bomb and retake the 747, despite already crossing into U.S. airspace. Jean spots a man with an electronic device and informs Grant, who enters the passenger cabin to take the suspected individual by surprise, only to find he is merely a diamond thief. Grant spots the real sleeper, Demou, and fights him for the detonator. Hassan attempts to shoot Grant, but is himself shot by an on-board air marshal.

The commandos storm the cabin as a firefight ensues. Grant struggles to wrestle the detonator from Demou's grip while Baker and Rat gun down several terrorists. Louie assists Grant by fatally shooting Demou and eliminating the remaining terrorists. Demou, however, manages to arm the bomb before dying, and stray bullets from a terrorist's weapon pierce a window, causing explosive decompression. The bomb is disarmed just in time by Cappy and Cahill as the 747 stabilizes. Hassan kills the pilots and damages the controls before being shot and killed by Rat.

Despite his limited flying experience and poor flying technique, Grant takes control of the 747 and attempts a landing but misses the approach to Dulles International Airport. Now flying north over Maryland, Grant recognizes the area surrounding his training airfield, Frederick Field, and opts to attempt to land the 747 there. With Jean's assistance, Grant successfully lands the airliner, despite destroying a row of parked small planes and losing one of the 747's engines. The passengers are safely evacuated. Baker, Louie, Rat, and Cappy salute Grant for his leadership before he is summoned to the Pentagon.

== Cast ==
- Kurt Russell as Dr. David Grant, a consultant for U.S. Army Intelligence
- Steven Seagal as Lieutenant Colonel Austin Travis, U.S. Army Special Forces
- Halle Berry as Jean, Flight Attendant
- John Leguizamo as Captain Carlos "Rat" Lopez, U.S. Army Special Forces
- David Suchet as Nagi Hassan / Al-Tar, Co-chief of the extremist organization
- Oliver Platt as Dennis Cahill, Aeronautic Engineer
- Joe Morton as First Sergeant Campbell "Cappy" Matheny, U.S. Army Special Forces
- BD Wong as Staff Sergeant Louie Jung, U.S. Army Special Forces
- Len Cariou as Secretary of Defense Charles White
- Whip Hubley as Sergeant 1st Class Michael Baker, U.S. Army Special Forces
- Andreas Katsulas as Abu El-Sayed Jaffa, Chief of the extremist organization
- Mary Ellen Trainor as Allison
- Marla Maples as Nancy
- J. T. Walsh as Senator Jason Mavros
- Nicholas Pryor as Secretary of State Jack Douglas
- Ingo Neuhaus as "Doc", U.S. Army Special Forces
- Todd Jefferies as Collins, U.S. Army Special Forces
- Ilia Volok as Chechen Thug
- Robert Apisa as Jean-Paul Demou, sleeper terrorist and also a bomb triggerman
- Juan Fernandez as London Bomber
- Magdalene St. Michaels as London Hostess (credited as Jayne Walters)
- William James Jones as Catman
- Charles Hallahan as General Sarlow, U.S. Army
- Richard Riehle as Air Marshal George Edwards
- Eugene Roche as Admiral Lewis
- Ken Jenkins as General Wood
- Jay Tavare as Nabill
- Shaun Toub as Terrorist
- Christopher Maher as Terrorist
- Sayed Badreya as Terrorist
- Ahmed Ahmed as Terrorist
- Joey Naber as Terrorist
- Majed Ibrahim as Terrorist
- Jon Huertas as Terrorist (first film role)
- Ray Baker as 747 Captain
- Michael Milhoan as 747 First Officer

== Production ==
Stuart Baird, an editor who was twice nominated for the Academy Awards, made his directorial debut with Executive Decision. Kurt Russell was paid $7.5 million and Halle Berry was paid $1 million to star in the film. David Suchet learned Arabic for his role.

Steven Seagal has said that he was enticed to accept the unusual role of Austin Travis by a hefty salary, which amounted to around a million dollars per day spent on the shoot. He also found some satisfaction in knowing that his character's unexpected fate would shock the audience, and therefore did not regret taking the role. Leguizamo described Seagal as a "horrible human", who told the other actors when he arrived on set "I’m in command. What I say is law."; when Leguizamo laughed at this, Seagal slammed him into a wall.

Exterior shots of the Boeing 747 were done using models and two real aircraft. Grant McCune Design constructed two models for actual shooting, one model to test the rig, one complete lower half for closeups of the landing gear extension sequence, and one 1/12 scale nose section for the stealth docking sequence. Two models of the Remora were also made at 1/6 scale, one for the docking sequence with a motion controlled snorkel and articulated hatch and another for post dock sequences. An ex-Kuwait Airways 747-269BM belonging to Kalitta Air (registration N707CK) was featured in most of the in-flight shots, while a Corsair 747-121 (externally identical to the 747-200) formerly owned by Pan Am was used for closeups of the aircraft in the aftermath of the crash landing at the end. The latter aircraft was stored in the Mojave Air and Space Port in Mojave, California, after filming wrapped up and was subsequently scrapped in 1998. The F-14s featured in the film came from the VF-84 Jolly Rogers squadron. This would be VF-84's last Hollywood appearance before disestablishment.

== Release ==
The film was released on March 15, 1996. The marketing of the film featured Seagal prominently, with trailers and television ads calling out his name along with Russell's, and some posters putting his name in second-billing position and depicting his likeness almost as large as Russell's. This was a deliberate misdirection, to make the death of Seagal's character early in the film a surprise to audiences.

=== Critical response ===
On Rotten Tomatoes, the film has an approval rating of 63% based on reviews from 43 critics. The site's consensus states: "Executive Decision adheres entertainingly to classic action thriller formula, proving a genre outing doesn't need to win points for originality to be solidly effective." On Metacritic, the film has an approval rating of 62 out of 100, based on reviews from 20 critics. Audiences polled by CinemaScore gave the film an average grade of "A−" on an A+ to F scale.

Leonard Maltin called it "a tense, inventive thriller" which needed more editing. Leonard Klady of Variety wrote, "The picture's logic may be a bit fast and loose, but its action-and-excitement quotient is top-notch." Roger Ebert rated it 3 out of 4 stars, calling it "a gloriously goofy mess of a movie" with several plot holes (e.g. smuggling a toxin into the country would probably be easier and just as effective as hijacking) that nonetheless managed to be entertaining. Ebert praised the first-act plot twist of killing off the character played by Seagal, then a major Hollywood star: "I perked right up". On their TV show, Ebert's colleague Gene Siskel praised rookie director Stuart Baird for going "full tilt," pushing past several "natural endings" to deliver more action, saying that the excitement made the film's logical flaws easy to overlook. He gave the film a "thumbs up."

Doug Hamilton, writing for The Atlanta Constitution, called the film a "crafty pastiche of Tom Clancy, Die Hard and Airport" in his three star review. Seagal's early death was praised by Marc Horton, writing for Edmonton Journal, but he criticized the rest of the film as predictable in his review that gave the film two out of five stars. It was called "a preposterous but riveting new entry into Hollywood's neverending lineup of cliched, action packed techno-thrillers" by Michael Reid in his four out of five stars review for the Times Colonist.

=== Accolades ===
Berry earned a Blockbuster Entertainment Award for Favorite Actress – Adventure/Drama for her performance in the film in 1997. Steven Seagal earned a Razzie Award nomination for Worst Supporting Actor for his performance in the film but lost to Marlon Brando for The Island of Dr. Moreau.

== Other versions ==
The European theatrical version of the film was edited by the studio in order to remove reference to Islam. The original US version was the source of the DVD, while the European version was used worldwide as the source for the Blu-ray HD master.

== Works cited ==
- "Deals". Los Angeles Times. August 12, 1995. p. F14 – via Newspapers.com.
- "Halle Berry is bringing in the big bucks". Oakland Tribune. April 25, 1995. p. CUE3 – via Newspapers.com.
- Hamilton, Doug (March 16, 1996). "Executive Decision". The Atlanta Constitution. p. 21 – via Newspapers.com.
- Horton, Marc (March 16, 1996). "Terrorism in the air too predictable to fly". Edmonton Journal. p. D2 – via Newspapers.com.
- Reid, Michael (March 16, 1996). "Journey jangles nerves". Times Colonist. p. E3 – via Newspapers.com.
- Turan, Kenneth (March 16, 1996). "'Decision' is savvy action thriller". Daily Press. p. D3 – via Newspapers.com.
- Young, Graham (July 22, 1995). "Poirot Turns To Crime". Birmingham Mail. p. 13 – via Newspapers.com.
