= Ned Vaughn =

American actor (born 1964)

- Born: November 20, 1964 (age 61); Huntsville, Alabama
- Occupation: Actor
- Years active: 1984–present
- Spouse: Adelaide (m. 1997)
- Children: 5

Ned Vaughn (born November 20, 1964) is an American film and television actor who served as vice president of the Screen Actors Guild prior to becoming the founding executive vice president of SAG-AFTRA. He resigned that position on 21 August 2013, when he announced he would run as a Republican candidate for California's 66th State Assembly district, representing Los Angeles County's South Bay region. However, he later withdrew from the race.

== Early life and education ==
Ned Vaughn was raised in Huntsville, Alabama with his sister Anna by their parents, Helen and Ed Vaughn. Vaughn's father was a news anchor and reporter for Huntsville's CBS Television affiliate (WHNT-TV) before starting his career as a civilian public affairs officer for the U.S. Army's Space and Missile Defense Command, which included work on Ronald Reagan's Strategic Defense Initiative, popularly known as Star Wars. Ned's mother, Helen, is an active professional artist whose early works were described as "celebrations of the many aspects of womanhood" and focusing on "the psychological truth of being female in today's society."

At age 10, Vaughn performed his first acting role in a community theater production of the musical Oliver!, staged in the Von Braun Center's 2000-seat concert hall. Vaughn continued acting as he attended Lee High School and performed in several productions while attending Birmingham–Southern College. It was there that Vaughn decided to pursue acting as a career. He drove to New York with just $600 and initially stayed with a family acquaintance, making the commute to New York City from Peekskill.

While taking classes at HB Studio in Greenwich Village, Vaughn made ends meet by working as a doorman at New York's Wellington Hotel, which he described as a crash course in human nature.

== Acting career ==
In January 1986, Vaughn booked his first professional job from his first audition: a Miami Vice-themed Pepsi commercial directed by Ridley Scott, which premiered during the 1986 Grammy Awards telecast. However, Vaughn's role did not appear in the final cut. Over the remainder of 1986, Vaughn was cast in more commercials and performed in the HB Playwrights Foundation production of K on K by Franz Kafka.

In February 1987, Vaughn was cast in his first starring film role in The Rescue, which also starred Kevin Dillon and featured James Cromwell. After filming was completed in New Zealand and Hong Kong, Vaughn moved to Los Angeles.

Vaughn's acting career quickly took off and in 1989, he was cast as Seaman Beaumont of the USS Dallas in the blockbuster film The Hunt for Red October. The same year, Vaughn joined the ABC television series China Beach, playing the role of Corporal Jeff Hyers. Throughout his career, Vaughn has gravitated toward characters who serve in the military (24, The Tuskegee Airmen, JAG, NCIS), law enforcement (Heroes, Frost/Nixon), and politics (The Unit).

In 1995, Vaughn appeared in Apollo 13. In 1998, Vaughn performed in Hellcab at the Tivoli Theatre in Dublin, Ireland during the Dublin Theatre Festival.

In addition to his film work, Vaughn has appeared in a wide variety of television programs, with nearly one hundred episodes to his credit. In 2011, Vaughn provided the face and voice of LAPD Captain Gordon Leary in video game L.A. Noire, which was the first video game to be shown at the Tribeca Film Festival.

== Screen Actors Guild / SAG-AFTRA leadership ==
In 2008, Vaughn campaigned to merge the Screen Actors Guild with the American Federation of Television and Radio Artists (AFTRA). Vaughn was elected to the SAG board in 2008 and became SAG 1st Vice President in 2010. During his tenure, Vaughn focused on uniting SAG and AFTRA. In January 2012, it was announced that a merger referendum would be presented to members of both unions. Merger opponents and SAG board members Martin Sheen and Ed Harris, along with former SAG president Ed Asner, filed a federal lawsuit to block the referendum, but the vote went ahead. When their case was dropped, Vaughn commented, "Dropping this frivolous lawsuit is the first good decision the plaintiffs have made." On 30 March 2012, the merger passed overwhelmingly, with 86% of AFTRA members and 82% of SAG members voting to create SAG-AFTRA, the largest union representing performers in the entertainment and media industries. Vaughn was the organization's founding executive vice president, serving as the second-ranking and only Republican national officer of the 160,000-member organization.

== Politics ==
On 21 August 2013, Vaughn announced he would run as a Republican candidate for California's 66th State Assembly district, representing Los Angeles County's South Bay region. On the same day, he resigned his position as SAG-AFTRA executive vice president in order to focus on his Assembly campaign. On 16 October 2013 Vaughn announced that he was withdrawing his candidacy.

== Personal life ==
Vaughn married his wife, Adelaide, in 1997. They have five children and live in Augusta, Georgia.

== Filmography ==
Year	Title	Role	Notes
1984	What Waits Below	American Soldier #1	
1988	The Rescue	Shawn Howard	
1988-1991	China Beach	Cpl. Jeff Hyers / Dewey	14 episodes
1990	Big Bad John	Billy Mahoney	
1990	The Hunt for Red October	Seaman Beaumont (the Sonar trainee) - USS Dallas	
1992	Wind	competitive sailor Charley Moore	
1992	Life Goes On	Eric	3 episodes
1994	Star Trek: The Next Generation	Ensign Cortin "Corey" Zweller	Episode: "Tapestry"
1995	Apollo 13	CAPCOM 2	
1995	The Tuskegee Airmen	Capt. Butler - B-17	TV movie
1995	The Tie That Binds	Officer David Carrey	
1995-1996	Murder One	Dean Crowley	12 episodes
1996	JAG	Lieutenant (jg) Arnoldi	Episode: "Defensive Action"
1996	Courage Under Fire	Chelli	
1999	Life	Young Sheriff Warren Pike	
2000	The Beach Boys: An American Family	Al Jardine	2 episodes
2001	JAG	Lieutenant Carl Barrett	Episodes: "Dog Robber: Part 1" & "Dog Robber: Part 2"
2002	The Climb	Michael Harris	
2004	JAG	Captain Rogers	Episode: "What If"
2005	24	terrorist Mitch Anderson	4 episodes
2006	Shark	Sam Bemis	Episode: "Déjà Vu All Over Again"
2006	Criminal Minds	Donald Curtis	Episode: "What Fresh Hell?"
2007	Cane	Michael Bronson	8 episodes
2008	Frost/Nixon	Secret Service Agent	
2008	NCIS	Captain Dean Pullman	Episode: "Stakeout"
2009	Mad Men	Ed Lawrence	Episode: "Souvenir"
2011	The Event	Dr. Reed	3 episodes
2011	L.A. Noire	Capt. Gordon Leary	Video game
2014	Parts Per Billion	CDC Spokesman	
2014	Atlas Shrugged Part III: Who Is John Galt?	Gerald Starnes	
2019	The Best of Enemies	Wilbur Hobby	
2021	Queen of the South	Agent Paul Panetta	Episode: "La Situación"
2024	MaXXXine	News Anchor	
