= Christine Harnos =

American actress (born 1968)

- Born: November 16, 1968 (age 57); Toronto, Canada
- Other name: Christina Harnos
- Education: Mills College
- Occupations: Actress; Producer; Model
- Years active: 1988–Present
- Known for: ER; Hellraiser: Bloodline; Dazed and Confused; The Rescue

Christine Harnos (born November 16, 1968) is a Canadian actress and co-founder of the circus outreach organization Circus Remedy.

== Career ==
=== Acting ===
Harnos portrayed Jennifer Greene, the first wife of main character Mark Greene on ER (1994–2002), Josie Ray in Remembering Sex (1998), Dotty from The Girl Gets Moe (1997), Rimmer in the action-horror film Hellraiser: Bloodline (1996), Kaye Faulkner in Dazed and Confused (1993), Linda Wyatt in Judgment Night (1993), Sarah Hughes in Cold Dog Soup (1990), and Sid in Denial (1990).

=== Child development ===
In 2003, Harnos left acting to pursue a degree in child development at Mills College. In 2006, she helped co-create the circus outreach organization Circus Remedy with friends Anthony Lucero and Terry Notary. She has served as executive director since 2006.

== Filmography ==
Film and television
Year	Title	Role	Notes
1988	The Rescue	Adrian Phillips	
1989	Forbidden Sun	Steph	
1990	Denial	Sid	
1990	Cold Dog Soup	Sarah Hughes	
1993	Dazed and Confused	Kaye Faulkner	
1993	Judgment Night	Linda Wyatt	
1994	Rebel Highway	Lorraine	TV series, episode: "Cool and the Crazy"
1994	ER	Jennifer Greene/Jennifer Simon	TV series, 1994–1998 (24 episodes), 2001 (2 episodes), 2002 (2 episodes)
1995	High Sierra Search and Rescue	Becca	TV series, episode: "Lillith"
1995	Too Something	Reni	TV series, episodes: "Precipice" and "Maria Cooks"
1996	Hellraiser: Bloodline	Rimmer	
1996	Drowning in West	Polly	
1996	Bloodhounds	Nikki Cruise	TV movie
1996	Thrill	Ann Simon	TV movie
1997	Hollywood Confidential	Shelly Katz	TV movie
1997	Pink as the Day She Was Born	Rhonda	
1997	The Girl Gets Moe	Dotty	
1998	Remembering Sex	Josie Ray	TV movie
1998	Star Trek: Voyager	Tessa Omond	TV series, episode: "Timeless"
2003	Seventh Veil		
