= Circus Remedy =

American nonprofit organization

- Founded: 2006
- Founders: Anthony Lucero; Terry Notary; Christine Harnos
- Type: non-profit organization
- Legal status: On hiatus (since 2020)
- Headquarters: United States

Circus Remedy is a non-profit organization providing circus outreach. It was founded in 2006 by friends Anthony Lucero, Terry Notary, and Christine Harnos.

To date, Circus Remedy has made over fifty visits and has collaborated with Paul Newman's Hole in the Wall Gang Camp, Amma's (Mātā Amṛtānandamayī) hospitals and orphanages in Kerala, India, Afghan Mini Mobile Circus in Kabul, Afghanistan, countless orphanages in Tanzania and South Africa, the Jewish and Arab Galilee Youth Circus in Israel, as well as children's hospitals throughout North America.

Circus Remedy produced two short films, Bipsy Twirlarina and the Make Believe Kid, and The Fable of Profitt the Fox, both for children's hospitals.

In 2009, Circus Remedy introduced The Little Hands Project to California schools, connecting healthy children to children with illness.

Circus Remedy went on hiatus in early 2020 in response to the COVID-19 pandemic.
