= Jim and John Thomas =

American screenwriter duo

Jim and John Thomas are American writers and producers. They are best known for Predator (1987) and Predator 2 (1990), Executive Decision (1996), Wild Wild West (1999), Behind Enemy Lines (2001), and the TV series Hard Time on Planet Earth.

== Career ==
In 1983, Jim had the idea that would become Predator and asked his brother for help in developing a script, "adding some welcome and effective bits of comedy to their thrill-packed storyline". The brothers took inspiration from a joke circulating in Hollywood concerning the Rocky franchise and how its lead character would have to fight an alien as there was nobody left on Earth to fight, and wrote a screenplay based on it. It was originally titled Hunter. The script was picked up by 20th Century Fox in 1985, and turned over to producer Joel Silver who, based on his experience with Commando, decided to turn the science fiction pulp storyline into a big-budget film.

The duo worked on a number of Hollywood productions through the 1980s, 1990s and 2000s, such as The Rescue (1988), Two-Fisted Tales (1992). The brothers co-wrote Mission to Mars (2000): "Screenwriters Graham Yost and Jim and John Thomas have substituted unconvincing slickness and popcorn drama for intellectual depth and character-driven suspense in Mars. Then to make matters worse, they deliver their tired package to audiences through stilted dialogue that has the actors trying to be profound when in reality they're being laughable", commented Christine Thomassini. They also wrote the screenplay of Predator 2, Wild Wild West, and Behind Enemy Lines.

The brothers created the short-lived TV series Hard Time on Planet Earth. Scheduled opposite NBC's Unsolved Mysteries and ABC's Growing Pains on Wednesdays, Hard Time on Planet Earth ranked 65th out of 81 programs upon its premiere. The series, which the duo had conceived in response to CBS's request to the brothers for a show "similar to the Incredible Hulk", was canceled by CBS in July 1989.

In 2021, the pair sued Disney and 20th Century Studios, claiming that the franchise rights to Predator had reverted to them. 20th Century counter sued, disputing the claim. In 2022, the pair settled with Disney in a confidential settlement. Disney has since released several Predator movies in the franchise.

== Filmography as screenwriters ==
Year	Title	Director	Notes
1987	Predator	John McTiernan	Also creators of the characters
1988	The Rescue	Ferdinand Fairfax	
1989	Hard Time on Planet Earth		TV series; also creators
1990	Predator 2	Stephen Hopkins	
1991	Two-Fisted Tales	Robert Zemeckis	"Yellow"
1996	Executive Decision	Stuart Baird	
1999	Wild Wild West	Barry Sonnenfeld	
2000	Mission to Mars	Brian De Palma	
2001	Behind Enemy Lines	John Moore	
