= The Rescue (1988 film) =

1988 film by Ferdinand Fairfax

- Film Poster
- Directed by: Ferdinand Fairfax
- Written by: Michael J. Henderson (uncredited); Jim Thomas; John Thomas
- Produced by: Laura Ziskin
- Starring: Kevin Dillon; Marc Price; Ned Vaughn; Christine Harnos; Ian Giatti; Charles Haid; Edward Albert; Timothy Carhart; Michael Gates Phenicie; Mel Wong; James Cromwell
- Cinematography: Russell Boyd
- Edited by: David Holden; Carroll Timothy O'Meara
- Music by: Bruce Broughton
- Production companies: Touchstone Pictures; Silver Screen Partners III
- Distributed by: Buena Vista Pictures Distribution
- Release date: August 5, 1988 (U.S.)
- Running time: 97 minutes
- Country: United States
- Language: English
- Budget: $14.5 million
- Box office: US$5,855,392

The Rescue is a 1988 American adventure film about a group of teenagers and a pre-teen who infiltrate a North Korean prison to rescue their Navy SEAL fathers. It was written by Michael J. Henderson, Jim Thomas, and John Thomas, produced by Laura Ziskin, and directed by Ferdinand Fairfax. The film stars Kevin Dillon, Ned Vaughn, Marc Price, Charles Haid, Christine Harnos, Ian Giatti, and James Cromwell.

== Plot ==
At a U.S. military base in South Korea, news breaks that a U.S. Navy submarine has become disabled in international waters near North Korea. A team of four Navy SEALS travels to the underwater site of the sub, rescues the captain, and lays explosives. The SEALS' raft is intercepted by a North Korean helicopter just as the explosives detonate and they are imprisoned in a North Korean fortress. On the base, the SEALS' children watch news of their fathers' trial for espionage.

Learning that a rescue mission is being planned, electronics whiz Max plants a listening bug in a conference room so that he and his friends Shawn and Adrian, whose fathers are among the captured soldiers, can listen in via radio. In the meeting, a rescue mission is proposed, code-named "Operation Phoenix," involving infiltration of the North Korean base to rescue the SEALS. Unwilling to risk aggravation of North Korea and its allies, the Secretary of State dismisses the plan. Shawn gives a tape of the meeting to J.J. Merrill, a rebellious teenager whose father was also on the captured SEAL team. J.J. proposes that they carry out the mission themselves. Shawn and Max secretly copy the operation plans.

Max smuggles the team off the base to the harbor where they are forced to steal a boat. In the chaos, they find that Shawn's little brother Bobby has stowed away with them. Shortly after, the group evades a patrol boat and enters North Korean waters. In the village of Sang-Ri, near the fortress where the SEALS are held, the teens locate the hideout of Col. Kim Song of South Korean Intelligence, who was intended to assist with Operation Phoenix. He is impressed with their bravery, but says that they have no chance without American Special Forces. He plans to escort them back home to safety. That night, the teens sneak out and continue on foot to the fortress. Travelling through a well and sewer system, they find a stash of smoke canisters and grenades then enter the base.

Shawn and Max set off fireworks found on the base, originally intended for a "Workers' Day" celebration, to create a diversion while J.J. frees the SEALS. Kim Song and his men show up at the base in disguise and aid the group in fighting its way out and back down the well. They slide down a long drain pipe and end up back in the village. They drive to an airfield and secure a Bristol Freighter, which Adrian's father pilots. Kim Song stays behind to hold off the North Koreans and give them time to take off. The plane crosses the border back into South Korea. The South Korean base scrambles fighter jets to intercept, fearing the plane is an intruder from the North. Bobby sticks out of the top hatch of the plane and flashes his Bruce Springsteen Born in The USA concert T-shirt, identifying the passengers as American to the fighter jets. Approaching the runway at the base, the plane runs out of fuel, but Lt. Phillips is still able to make a safe landing. Triumphant, the group exits the plane and reunites with their families.

== Cast ==
- Kevin Dillon - J.J. Merrill
- Christine Harnos - Adrian Phillips
- Marc Price - Max Rothman
- James Cromwell - Admiral Rothman
- Ned Vaughn - Shawn Howard
- Edward Albert - Commander Merrill
- Ellen Barber - Virginia Phillips
- Timothy Carhart - Lt. Phillips
- Anne E. Curry - Sybil Howard
- Ian Michael Giatti - Bobby Howard
- Lorry Goldman - Secretary Gates
- Wendy Gordon - Newscaster
- Charles Haid - Commander Howard
- Rocky Wing Cheung Ho - Cell Guard
- Sal Mazzotta - Dino
- Tom Nelson - Captain Stillman
- Stephen Ng - Kim Song Man 1
- Norman Palacio - Gate Guard

== Soundtrack ==
In 2014, Intrada Records released a CD of the score composed and conducted by Bruce Broughton.

1. Main Title (4:31)
2. Diving SEALS (1:02)
3. Underwater Rescue (3:41)
4. News (0:53)
5. J.J. (1:18)
6. Nightwork (2:28)
7. Preparations (3:18)
8. The Boat (2:53)
9. Move It! (0:42)
10. At the Border (0:55)
11. Boat Chase (5:57)
12. Into Korea More (3:55)
13. The Monitor (0:57)
14. Dejected (1:06)
15. To the Prison (7:03)
16. Spooling Around (0:53)
17. The Rescue Begins (6:26)
18. The Rescue (7:16)
19. The Plane! The Plane! (6:42)
20. The Landing and End Credits (5:03)
21. J.J. (Alternate) (0:53)
22. Armed Forces Radio (1:39)
23. Almost Ready (Source) (2:23)

== Reception ==
The picture was a flop, both commercially and critically. It earned slightly under $6 million at the box office, less than half its budget. Film critic and historian Leonard Maltin described it as "...Dumb and obnoxious, just like its teenage leads, who really do Rambo proud in the crunch; recommended only for the undiscriminating 12-year-old boys at whom it's targeted."

== Film locations ==
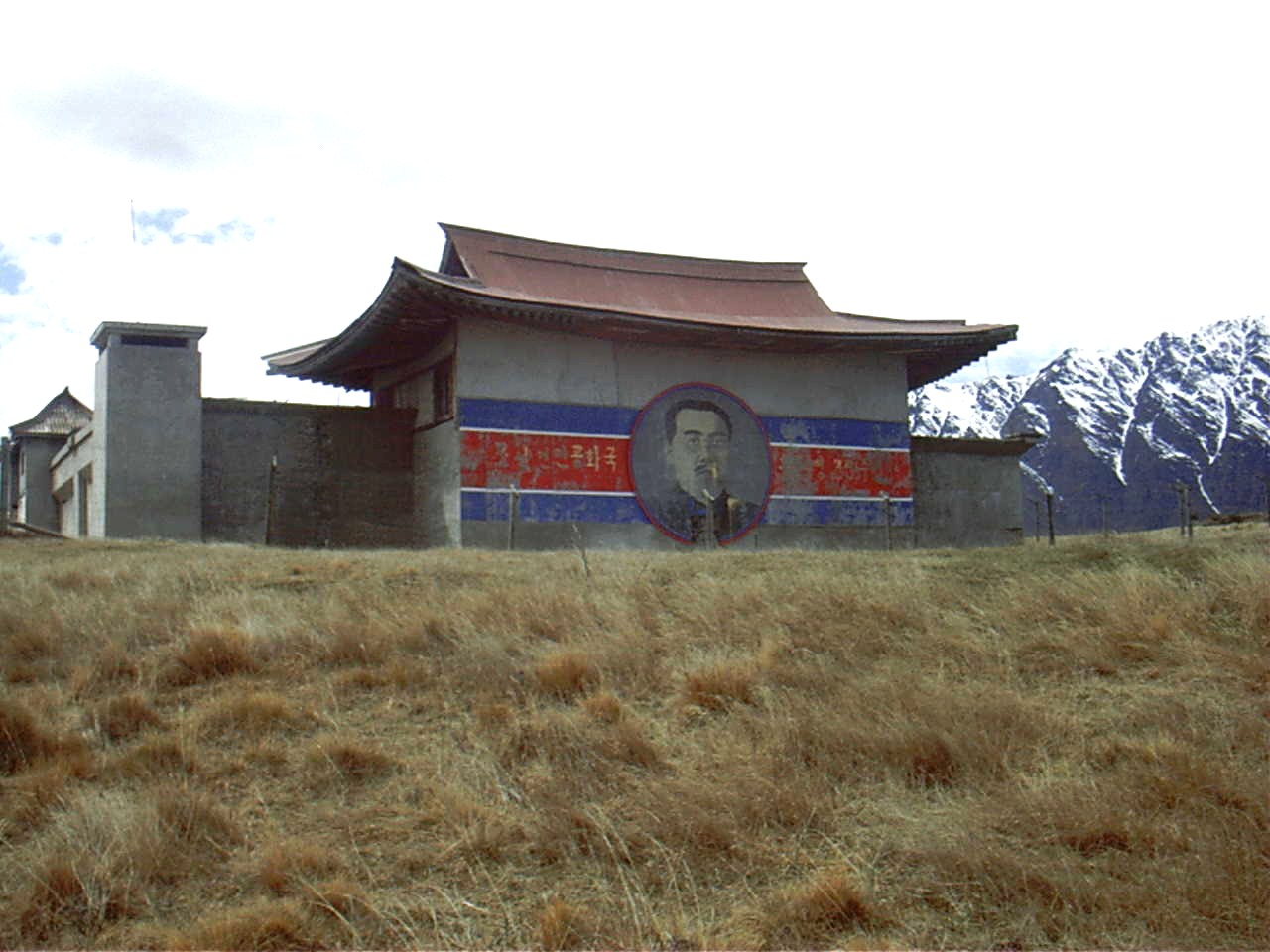
Film set building in Queenstown

Primary photography took place in New Zealand. Airbase sequences were filmed at RNZAF Base Whenuapai and the former RNZAF Base Hobsonville in Auckland, New Zealand. Jetboat scene filmed on the Shotover River near Queenstown and in other scenic locations around New Zealand filling in for South and North Korea.

The building in which the hostage scene was shot is still visible near Queenstown.

== Film aircraft ==
Royal New Zealand Air Force Douglas A-4 Skyhawk's from 75 Squadron RNZAF were used for Airbase ground scenes and with a Bristol Freighter in the climatic escape scene. The RNZAF Skyhawks were repainted in USAF colour markings for the film.
