= Two-Fisted Tales (film) =

- Japanese DVD cover
- Genre: Drama; Thriller; War
- Based on: Two-Fisted Tales by Harvey Kurtzman
- Written by: Gilbert Adler; Frank Darabont ("Showdown"); Randall Jahnson ("King of the Road"); Jim Thomas ("Yellow"); John Thomas ("Yellow")
- Directed by: Richard Donner; Tom Holland; Robert Zemeckis
- Starring: William Sadler; David Morse; Brad Pitt; Kirk Douglas; Lance Henriksen; Dan Aykroyd
- Music by: Michael Kamen ("Showdown"); Warren Zevon ("King of the Road"); Alan Silvestri ("Yellow")
- Country of origin: United States
- Original language: English

Production
- Executive producers: Richard Donner; Walter Hill; Joel Silver; Robert Zemeckis
- Producer: William Teitler
- Production locations: Old Tucson - 201 S. Kinney Road, Tucson, Arizona
- Cinematography: Hiro Narita ("Showdown"); Gary B. Kibbe ("King of the Road"); Don Burgess ("Yellow")
- Editor: Michael Thau
- Running time: 88 minutes
- Production company: Carolco Pictures

Original release
- Network: Fox
- Release: January 18, 1992

Two-Fisted Tales is a 1992 American made-for-television anthology horror film consisting of three separate segments, based on the EC Comics publication Two-Fisted Tales. Only one of the stories is actually adapted from a story appearing in an issue of EC Comics.

== Cast ==
- William Sadler – Mr. Rush (Presenter)

=== Segment: "Showdown" ===
- David Morse – Tom McMurdo
- Neil Giuntoli – Billy Quintaine
- Roderick Cook – Cornelius Bosch
- Thomas F. Duffy – Scorby
- Monty Bass – Frank Little Bear
- Mel Coleman – Blacksmith
- Grant Gelt – Little Boy
- Paul T. Murray – Harley
- Tommy Townsend – Big Bart

=== Segment: "King of the Road" ===
- Raymond J. Barry – Garrett
- Brad Pitt – Billy
- Michelle Bronson – Carrie
- Jack Kehler – Mole
- Alva L. Petway – Dispatcher

=== Segment: "Yellow" ===
- Kirk Douglas – Sr. Calthrob
- Eric Douglas – Jr. Calthrob
- Lance Henriksen – Ripper
- Dan Aykroyd – Milligan
- Dominick Morra – Priest
- Steve Boyum – King
- Chuck Picerni Jr. – Jones
- R. David Smith – Soldier

== Production ==
In 1991, the comic book was adapted for a TV pilot by producers Joel Silver, Richard Donner, Robert Zemeckis and others. Apart from an opening montage of covers from the comic book and use of comic's logo, the pilot had little connection with Kurtzman's creation. In imitation of EC's horror books, the hour-long anthology drama featured the ghostly gunfighter Mr. Rush (Bill Sadler) as a host and a device to connect the segments, although Kurtzman's war-adventure stories had never been introduced by a host. Two of the stories, "Showdown" (written by Frank Darabont and directed by Richard Donner) and "King of the Road" (written by Randall Jahnson and directed by Tom Holland), were original scripts and not adaptations from EC (although "Showdown" did share a title with a story from issue 37). The third story, "Yellow" (written by Jim Thomas & John Thomas and A. L. Katz & Gilbert Adler and directed by Robert Zemeckis), was adapted from a story written by Al Feldstein and illustrated by Jack Davis for the first issue of EC's Shock SuspenStories.

== Broadcast ==
Although it contains a 1991 copyright notice at the end of the credits, the pilot had a single telecast in the USA on January 18, 1992, generating little interest, and "Showdown" and "King of the Road" were later extracted to become individual episodes of HBO's Tales from the Crypt television series (though "Yellow" had been broadcast as an episode in the year before).
