= Stuart Baird =

British film director, film producer and film editor (born 1947)

- Born: 14 January 1947 (age 79); Uxbridge, Middlesex, England
- Occupations: Film editor, film director
- Years active: 1968–present

Stuart Baird (born 14 January 1947) is an English film editor, producer and director who is mainly associated with action films. He has edited over thirty major motion pictures.

== Life and career ==
Baird has had an extended collaboration with director Richard Donner. For Baird's work on Superman in 1978, he was nominated for the Academy Award for Film Editing. He received another nomination for editing Gorillas in the Mist (1988). Prior to his working relationship with Richard Donner, Baird worked as assistant director and assistant editor on different projects before editing Ken Russell's Tommy. Baird worked with Russell on five major motion pictures. He edited Tommy, Lisztomania and Valentino and served as associate producer on Russell's Altered States. He also worked as assistant editor on Russell's The Devils (1971).

After his Oscar-nominated work on Gorillas in the Mist in 1988 and his work with Richard Donner on Lethal Weapon 2, he accepted a position as full-time staff editor at Warner Bros. in 1989. With Warner Bros., he supervised the editing on such films as Die Hard 2 (1990) and Robin Hood: Prince of Thieves (1991).

The first two movies Baird directed were studio pictures produced and distributed by Warner Bros.; where he had served as Editor Supervisor. He has directed three films: Executive Decision (1996), U.S. Marshals (1998) and Star Trek: Nemesis (2002). He was the editor and executive producer of Lara Croft: Tomb Raider (2001). Baird edited the Columbia Pictures thriller Vantage Point.

In the film Star Trek: Nemesis, Baird also voiced the Scimitar computer. To get the job directing Star Trek: Nemesis, Baird performed re-cuts on Lara Croft: Tomb Raider and Mission: Impossible 2 for Paramount Pictures. Jerry Goldsmith was the composer for all of the Baird-directed films.

== Filmography ==
Editor

- If (1968) (as assistant director)
- The Devils (1971) (as assistant editor)
- Tommy (1975)
- Lisztomania (1975)
- The Omen (1976)
- Superman (1978)
- Valentino (1977)
- Outland (1981)
- Five Days One Summer (1982)
- The Honorary Consul (1983)
- Revolution (1985)
- Ladyhawke (1985) (also second unit director)
- Lethal Weapon (1987)
- Gorillas in the Mist (1988)
- Tango & Cash (1989) (supervising)
- Lethal Weapon 2 (1989)
- Die Hard 2 (1990)
- The Last Boy Scout (1991)
- Tales from the Crypt (1992) (Episode "Split Personality")
- Radio Flyer (1992)
- Demolition Man (1993)
- Maverick (1994)
- Executive Decision (1996)
- Star Trek: Nemesis (2002)
- The Legend of Zorro (2005)
- Superman II: The Richard Donner Cut (2006)
- Casino Royale (2006)
- Vantage Point (2008)
- Whiteout (2009)
- Edge of Darkness (2010)
- Salt (2010)
- Green Lantern (2011)
- Skyfall (2012)
- Rogue One: A Star Wars Story (2016) (as additional editor)
- Bitter Harvest (2017)
- Tomb Raider (2018)
- Across the River and into the Trees (2021)

Director

- Executive Decision (1996)
- U.S. Marshals (1998)
- Star Trek: Nemesis (2002)

Other credits

Year	Title	Role
1968	If....	Assistant to the director
1980	Altered States	Associate producer
1985	Ladyhawke	2nd unit director
1988	Scrooged	Post-production consultant
1991	Robin Hood: Prince of Thieves	Project consultant
2001	Lara Croft: Tomb Raider	Executive producer
2017	Bitter Harvest	Producer

== Accolades ==
Academy Awards

- 1978: Academy Award for Best Film Editing – Superman (nominated)
- 1988: Academy Award for Best Film Editing – Gorillas in the Mist: The Story of Dian Fossey (nominated)

American Cinema Editors

- Baird has been elected to membership in the American Cinema Editors.
- 1978: Eddie Award for Best Edited Feature Film – Superman (nominated)
- 2006: Eddie Award for Best Edited Feature Film – Dramatic – Casino Royale (nominated)
- 2012: Eddie Award for Best Edited Feature Film – Dramatic – Skyfall (nominated)

British Academy Film Awards

- 2006: BAFTA Award for Film Award Best Editing – Casino Royale (nominated)
- 2012: BAFTA Award for Film Award Best Editing – Skyfall (nominated)

== See also ==
- List of film director and editor collaborations
