= Chucky season 2 =

American horror television series

Chucky
- Season 2
- Promotional poster
- Showrunner: Don Mancini
- Starring: Zackary Arthur; Björgvin Arnarson; Alyvia Alyn Lind; Brad Dourif
- No. of episodes: 8

Release
- Original network: Syfy; USA Network
- Original release: October 5 – November 23, 2022

Season chronology
- ← Previous; Season 1 Next → Season 3

The second season of the American horror series Chucky, created by Don Mancini, was broadcast simultaneously on Syfy and USA Network between October 5 and November 23, 2022, comprising eight episodes. Based on the Child's Play film franchise, the series serves as a sequel to Cult of Chucky, and stars Brad Dourif reprising his role as the voice of the titular character, alongside Zackary Arthur, Alyvia Alyn Lind, and Björgvin Arnarson in the ensemble cast.

== Cast and characters ==
=== Main ===
- Zackary Arthur as Jake Wheeler
- Björgvin Arnarson as Devon Evans
- Alyvia Alyn Lind as Lexy Cross
- Brad Dourif as the voice of Chucky / Charles Lee Ray
  - Jacob Breedon as Chucky (in-suit performer)
  - David Kohlsmith as young Charles Lee Ray (7 years old)
  - Tyler Barish as young Charles Lee Ray (14 years old)

=== Recurring ===
- Alex Vincent as Andy Barclay
- Devon Sawa as Father Bryce
  - Also portrayed Chucky
- Fiona Dourif as Nica Pierce
  - Also portrayed Chucky
- Jennifer Tilly as Tiffany Valentine and herself
  - Jacob Breedon as Doll Tiffany (in-suit performer)
- Bella Higginbotham as Nadine
- Christine Elise as Kyle
- Lachlan Watson as Glen and Glenda Tilly
- Rosemary Dunsmore as Dr. Amanda Mixter
  - Sage Kitchen as young Dr. Mixter
  - Also portrayed Chucky
- Lara Jean Chorostecki as Sister Ruth
- Andrea Carter as Sister Catherine

=== Notable guest stars ===
- Barbara Alyn Woods as Mayor Michelle Cross
- Carina London Battrick as Caroline Cross
- Ian D. Clark as Father O'Malley
- Gina Gershon as herself
- Liv Morgan as herself
- Joe Pantoliano as himself
- Sutton Stracke as herself
- Meg Tilly as herself
- Billy Boyd as the voice of G.G Valentine
- Annie M. Briggs as Rachel Fairchild

== Episodes ==
No. overall	No. in season	Title	Directed by	Written by	Original release date	U.S. viewers (millions)
9	1	"Halloween II"	Jeff Renfroe	Don Mancini	October 5, 2022	0.355 (SY); 0.320 (USN)
While the Tiffany doll holds him at gunpoint, Andy drives the truck of Good Guy dolls he stole off a cliff. Six months later, Jake now lives with a foster family in Salem, New Jersey, with his younger foster brother Gary. Therapist, Dr. Mixter, helps Caroline overcome her new fear of dolls by giving her a "non-possessed" doll, which resembles the original bride design of the Tiffany doll. Lexy alerts Jake and Devon of it; they arrive at her house and stay the night. The next day, Gary arrives at Lexy's house with Chucky in tow. Carrying a homemade bomb, Chucky explains that his army of dolls survived the crash, and that he planned to lure Jake, Devon, and Lexy to the same location so he could kill all three of them. Devon tases Chucky, who drops the bomb. Gary picks it up and runs, but Chucky attacks him and detonates the bomb, killing himself and Gary. Jake, Devon, and Lexy are blamed for Gary's death and are sent to the Catholic School of the Incarnate Lord, in the same building that contained the boarding home where Charles Lee Ray grew up. After their arrival, a Chucky-box-sized package is delivered to the school.
10	2	"The Sinners Are Much More Fun"	Samir Rehem	Mallory Westfall & Don Mancini	October 12, 2022	0.219 (SY); 0.209 (USN)
Tiffany wakes up next to the bloody head of the Tiffany doll that Andy killed. Nica-Chucky, who has now been Tiffany's captive for a year, says it's a warning that he is coming to kill her. A detective later visits Tiffany, investigating Nica's disappearance, but Tiffany kills him. At the School of the Incarnate Lord, Jake, Devon, and Lexy meet the headmaster, Father Bryce, as well as Lexy's eccentric roommate, Nadine, who admits she is a kleptomaniac. Lexy also discovers that Trevor, her childhood bully, is a student and altar boy. Meanwhile, the Chucky doll sent to the school awakens and causes a nun to die of a heart attack, whom he then photographs. When Bryce catches Jake confronting Chucky, he locks them in the same room. Chucky photographs Jake and escapes through the chimney. He then makes his way to Lexy's room and photographs her snorting clonazepam. Jake and Devon arrive and tie him up; Jake theorizes this specific Chucky is merely a scout for someone else. After it is revealed that Nica and Chucky have formed an alliance to take down Tiffany, Glen and Glenda, Chucky and Tiffany's twin children, arrive at their house.
11	3	"Hail Mary!"	Samir Rehem	Nick Zigler & Rachael Paradis	October 19, 2022	0.272 (SY); 0.239 (USN)
Lexy discovers that Chucky has only one contact in his phone, named "The Colonel." Trevor, who sees the drugs in Lexy's possession, informs her that Michelle Cross lost re-election and threatens to use his leverage to ruin her life. When Chucky refuses to reveal any information, Jake instead attempts to sway him to their side by means of sensory overload and aversion therapy. It appears to work, turning Chucky docile (and, seemingly, amnesiac). Jake and Devon argue over their methods, with Devon wanting to kill Chucky, while Jake still overcome with guilt over Gary's death, believing that he can only forgive himself if he can also forgive Chucky. Bryce witnesses the two kissing. Meanwhile, another Chucky doll is delivered to the school; he kills a priest while Nadine is in confessional. When Lexy suffers an anxiety attack, the docile Chucky leaves, later showing up on Bryce's desk. The next day, Trevor enters Lexy's empty room, but the newer Chucky follows him and kills him. Jake, Devon, Lexy, and Nadine are forced to hide the body. The newer Chucky, who is bigger and stronger than normal, enters Bryce's office and threatens the docile Chucky.
12	4	"Death on Denial"	Don Mancini	Alex Delyle & Kim Garland	October 26, 2022	0.224 (SY); 0.255 (USN)
Glen and Glenda, who believe that Tiffany is actually Jennifer Tilly, question her about her knowledge of Nica; Tiffany feigns ignorance. Glenda then mentions a recurring nightmare in which they murder a young woman. Glen and Glenda also reveal they have invited over Jennifer's friends and family - Gina Gershon, Joe Pantoliano, Sutton Stracke, and Meg Tilly - as part of a surprise party. Tiffany has also hired a butler, Jeeves, who aggravates the guests with crass questions despite Tiffany only hiring him to guard Nica's room. When Nica disappears from her room and Jeeves turns up dead (killed by Glenda), Tiffany pretends that she is hosting a murder mystery party. As Tiffany searches for Nica and questions her guests about Jeeves's death, it is revealed that Glen is aiding Nica and attempting to help her escape. Three months before, Glen and Glenda discovered a tied-up Nica, accidentally triggering an emergence of Nica-Chucky, who convinced Glenda to help him kill Tiffany. As Glen tries to usher Nica out of the house, the sight of Joe's corpse (killed by Gina) reawakens Nica-Chucky, and Glenda knocks Glen unconscious. Aided by new metal arms, Nica-Chucky tries to shoot Tiffany, but the bullets are gone. Tiffany slaps Nica-Chucky, bringing back Nica; Glen elects to stay behind as Nica escapes with Glenda, entering a car driven by a still-alive Kyle.
13	5	"Doll on Doll"	Leslie Libman	Mallory Westfall & Isabella Gutierrez	November 2, 2022	0.227 (SY); 0.249 (USN)
The two Chuckys fight inside Bryce's office; the docile Chucky, now calling himself Good Chucky, gets the upper hand and incapacitates the evil Chucky via crucifixion. Nadine and Lexy discover that Trevor's body is gone. Devon becomes exasperated at Jake's continued defense of Good Chucky, who begins to doubt his own morality. The evil Chucky recovers in front of nun Sister Ruth, who is immediately convinced that he is a reincarnation of God. Meanwhile, Glen, who has been having the same nightmare as Glenda, confronts Tiffany about Nica's captivity, but Tiffany refuses to divulge any information unless Glen reveals Nica's whereabouts. When a suspicious Meg decides to stay at Tiffany's house, a captive Jennifer - trapped inside a Tiffany doll - feeds Tiffany false information, and Meg and Glen walk in on the two arguing. When Jennifer begs Meg for help, Tiffany murders Meg and reveals her true identity to Glen, bequeathing them the original Glen/Glenda doll. Tiffany and Glen burn down the house and leave with the doll and a tied-up Jennifer to find Glenda. Meanwhile, Devon and Lexy follow clues from the photos on Chucky's phone, leading them to a cabin near the grounds; in it, they see the bodies of Chucky's recent victims, "The Colonel", who is a bald Chucky torturing a still-alive Andy, and Dr. Mixter, who calls the doll "Charlie".
14	6	"He Is Risen Indeed"	Leslie Libman	Alex Delyle & Kim Garland	November 9, 2022	0.227 (SY); 0.246 (USN)
A flashback reveals that after the truck crash, several of the remaining Chuckys, including The Colonel, dragged an unconscious Andy to captivity. Dr. Mixter, who was Charles Lee Ray's childhood therapist, offers to help The Colonel kill the other teens. When they leave the cabin, Devon and Lexy free Andy, who demands they take him back to the school. Bryce, furious at Devon and Lexy for leaving the grounds, locks down the school. Devon and Lexy bring Andy (posing as a homeless man) to the school, and Bryce begrudgingly allows him to stay thanks to the influence of Sister Catherine. Meanwhile, Kyle convinces Nica to allow her to speak to Nica-Chucky, but he merely taunts her about Andy and unsuccessfully urges Glenda to kill her. Kyle, Nica, and Glenda later drive towards the school. Sister Ruth attempts to convince Bryce of the evil Chucky's God-like sentience, but he accuses her of heresy; The Colonel later kills the evil Chucky via arsenic-laced communion wafers. Sister Ruth vows to avenge him. Andy informs the teens that The Colonel went insane and killed all the other surviving Chuckys from the crash. He kills The Colonel but is disturbed to see Good Chucky. Dr. Mixter, armed with a gun, retrieves Good Chucky, locking Andy and the teens inside their room. Good Chucky sees Bryce and begs for help while Andy breaks down the door; in the ensuing chaos, Dr. Mixter wounds Sister Catherine and knocks Andy unconscious, while Good Chucky runs upstairs with Nadine in pursuit. When Nadine tries to comfort him, he briefly turns evil and pushes her out of a window to her death.
15	7	"Goin' to the Chapel"	John Hyams	Nick Zigler & Amanda Blanchard	November 16, 2022	0.130 (SY); 0.230 (USN)
Dr. Mixter claims she needs Good Chucky, the final Good Guy doll, to free Nica-Chucky, who she calls "Chucky Prime." She forces Bryce, along with the rest of the group, to perform an exorcism on Good Chucky to send Chucky to Hell, in exchange for performing a voodoo ritual to move Chucky Prime to Good Chucky's body. A traumatized Lexy overdoses on clonazepam, causing her to hallucinate Nadine's ghost, who convinces her to keep going. Glenda demands answers from Chucky, but he simply calls them a killer and demands they help him escape. The exorcism causes Chucky to enter Bryce's body; Bryce then explodes. Nica successfully performs the ritual, and Jake attempts to kill Chucky Prime, but Sister Ruth arrives, holding Lexy at gunpoint. Jake allows Dr. Mixter to leave with Chucky Prime; Sister Ruth prepares to kill Lexy anyway, but Glenda kills Sister Ruth before she can. Andy chases Dr. Mixter and Chucky Prime; he kills Chucky Prime, but Dr. Mixter escapes. Meanwhile, with Jennifer Tilly now wanted for murder, Tiffany has formulated a new plan: to swap bodies with Jennifer again. However, Jennifer escapes from the car and is killed by an oncoming truck, devastating Tiffany. Tiffany and Glen arrive at the school, where Nica attempts to shoot Tiffany, but Glen jumps in the path of the bullet. Tiffany and Glenda take Glen away to get help.
16	8	"Chucky Actually"	Jeff Renfroe	Alex Delyle & Mallory Westfall & Don Mancini	November 23, 2022	0.138 (SY); 0.244 (USN)
A flashback reveals that Chucky Prime was able to perform the ritual to swap bodies with Dr. Mixter before Andy killed the doll. Now in her body, Chucky retrieves a new Good Guy doll from her office, which he transfers himself into (resulting in the police finding Dr. Mixter's body). With Glen's condition worsening, Glenda and Tiffany decide to save them by transferring them into the Glen/Glenda doll. After killing a suspicious cop, they perform the ritual - transferring both twins into the doll, now calling themselves G.G. Tiffany ships G.G. to England, so they can learn more about their origins. Weeks after returning home, Jake and Lexy enlist in group therapy, and Lexy invites Jake and Devon to stay at her house for Christmas. On Christmas Eve, Jake and Devon, along with Lexy and Michelle, mend their respective relationships. Chucky arrives at the house, as does Tiffany, who is searching for Caroline's Belle doll. Chucky murders Michelle when she comes down the stairs, and Tiffany doesn't intervene when Lexy arrives and kills Chucky. Jake and Devon wound Tiffany, but Caroline, whose mind has been fully twisted by Chucky, claims Tiffany is her real mother and leaves with her and the Belle doll. The next day, Jake, Devon, and Lexy are visited by Miss Fairchild, who believes their stories about Chucky. Three weeks later, after Tiffany and Caroline moved to New York, Tiffany received a threatening phone call from Nica (who is in New York as well), who swears revenge on her. Tiffany attempts to transfer her soul into the Belle doll but fails when it's revealed to be Chucky in disguise; he attacks Tiffany as Caroline smiles.

== Production ==
On November 29, 2021, USA Network and Syfy renewed Chucky for a second season which premiered on October 5, 2022. In June 2022, Lachlan Watson was cast as Glen/Glenda Ray. On January 15, 2023, the series was renewed for a third season.

== Reception ==
=== Critical response ===
On Rotten Tomatoes, the second season has an approval rating of 93% based on 14 critics, with an average rating of 7/10. Reviewing the first two episodes that were sent to critics, Collider's Alyse Wax said that the show at first "just seems like standard everyday horrors", although being "fun" and "a delight". Slash Film's Jeff Ewing highlighted the way the three main actors (Arthur, Arnarson and Alyn Lind) play off each other's performances, since they are "more convincing together than apart". The A.V. Club's Tom Philip said the show wouldn't draw in new fans but faithful fans would consider it as "one of the best spooky shows on TV".

=== Ratings ===
==== Syfy ====
Viewership and ratings per episode of Chucky season 2
No.	Title	Air date	Rating (18–49)	Viewers (millions)	DVR (18–49)	DVR viewers (millions)	Total (18–49)	Total viewers (millions)
1	"Halloween II"	October 5, 2022	0.1	0.355	0.1	0.209	0.2	0.564
2	"The Sinners Are Much More Fun"	October 12, 2022	0.1	0.219	0.1	0.199	0.2	0.418
3	"Hail Mary!"	October 19, 2022	0.1	0.272	0.1	0.155	0.2	0.427
4	"Death on Denial"	October 26, 2022	0.1	0.224	TBD	TBD	TBD	TBD
5	"Doll on Doll"	November 2, 2022	0.1	0.227	TBD	TBD	TBD	TBD
6	"He Is Risen Indeed"	November 9, 2022	0.1	0.227	TBD	TBD	TBD	TBD
7	"Goin' to The Chapel"	November 16, 2022	0.0	0.130	TBD	TBD	TBD	TBD
8	"Chucky Actually"	November 23, 2022	0.1	0.138	TBD	TBD	TBD	TBD

==== USA Network ====
Viewership and ratings per episode of Chucky season 2
No.	Title	Air date	Rating (18–49)	Viewers (millions)	DVR (18–49)	DVR viewers (millions)	Total (18–49)	Total viewers (millions)
1	"Halloween II"	October 5, 2022	0.2	0.320	0.1	0.127	0.2	0.447
2	"The Sinners Are Much More Fun"	October 12, 2022	0.1	0.209	TBD	TBD	TBD	TBD
3	"Hail Mary!"	October 19, 2022	0.1	0.239	TBD	TBD	TBD	TBD
4	"Death on Denial"	October 26, 2022	0.1	0.255	TBD	TBD	TBD	TBD
5	"Doll on Doll"	November 2, 2022	0.1	0.249	TBD	TBD	TBD	TBD
6	"He Is Risen Indeed"	November 9, 2022	0.1	0.246	TBD	TBD	TBD	TBD
7	"Goin' to The Chapel"	November 16, 2022	0.1	0.230	TBD	TBD	TBD	TBD
8	"Chucky Actually"	November 23, 2022	0.1	0.244	TBD	TBD	TBD	TBD
