= Child's Play 2 =

1990 film by John Lafia

- Theatrical release poster
- Directed by: John Lafia
- Written by: Don Mancini
- Based on: Child's Play by Don Mancini
- Produced by: David Kirschner
- Starring: Alex Vincent; Jenny Agutter; Gerrit Graham; Christine Elise; Grace Zabriskie
- Cinematography: Stefan Czapsky
- Edited by: Edward Warschilka
- Music by: Graeme Revell
- Production company: Living Doll Productions
- Distributed by: Universal Pictures
- Release date: November 9, 1990
- Running time: 84 minutes
- Country: United States
- Language: English
- Budget: $13 million
- Box office: $35.8 million

Child's Play 2 is a 1990 American supernatural slasher film written by Don Mancini and directed by John Lafia. It is a sequel to Child's Play (1988) and the second installment in the Child's Play franchise. Alex Vincent and Brad Dourif reprised their roles while Christine Elise, Jenny Agutter, Gerrit Graham and Grace Zabriskie joined the cast. The film is set two years after the first film; it follows Chucky continuing his pursuit for Andy Barclay, who was placed in foster care, and transferring his soul into him after being resurrected.

Child's Play 2 was released on November 9, 1990, by Universal Pictures. The film received mixed reviews from critics and grossed over $35 million on a budget of $13 million. It was followed by a sequel, Child's Play 3 (1991).

== Plot ==
Two years after the death of Chucky, (Note: As depicted in Child's Play (1988)) the Play Pals Corporation, manufacturer of the Good Guy doll line, is attempting to recover from the negative publicity surrounding the event. To reassure its stockholders that there was nothing actually wrong with the doll, they acquire Chucky's remains and reassemble him. During the process, a power surge fatally electrocutes one of the assembly line workers and Chucky is reanimated. Haskell Sullivan, the CEO of the company, orders his assistant Mattson to dispose of the doll.

Meanwhile, Andy Barclay, now eight years old, has been in foster care ever since his mother, Karen, was institutionalized for backing up his claims that Chucky was alive. Andy is brought in by foster parents Phil and Joanne Simpson, though Phil is apprehensive about Andy's needs. Andy later meets Kyle, a cynical, street-smart teenage girl the Simpsons are also fostering. Chucky uses Mattson's car phone to call Grace Poole, the manager of Andy's foster center, and gets the Simpsons' address. He forces Mattson to drive him there before suffocating him to death with a plastic bag.

Chucky infiltrates the Simpsons' home and takes the place of another Good Guy doll, "Tommy". He destroys the doll with an antique heirloom and buries it in the backyard. Andy begins to bond with Kyle after the two are punished for the heirloom Chucky destroyed. That night, Chucky reveals himself to Andy, tying him up and beginning the voodoo chant to possess his body. Kyle enters the room before he can complete the chant and he reverts to his lifeless state; Kyle does not believe Andy's claim that Chucky is alive. Phil and Joanne barge into the room and blame Kyle for the chaos, and Phil throws Chucky into the basement in frustration. Chucky's nose starts bleeding, and he realizes that his body is becoming human again.

The next day, Chucky secretly follows Andy to school and defaces his homework, resulting in Andy being assigned detention. Chucky kills Andy's teacher Miss Kettlewell by stabbing her with an air pump and beating her with a yardstick, but Andy escapes. He tries to warn his foster parents about Chucky, but Phil refuses to believe him and considers returning him to the foster center.

That night, Andy sneaks into the basement to confront Chucky with an electric knife, but the doll overpowers him until Andy cuts Chucky's head with the knife. When Phil arrives to investigate, Chucky trips him, causing him to fall from the stairs and break his neck. Joanne blames Andy for Phil's death and sends him back to the foster center. Alone in the house, Chucky kills Joanne. Kyle discovers "Tommy" buried outside and realizes Andy was telling the truth. She rushes with a knife to warn Joanne, but finds her dead. Chucky ambushes Kyle, taking the knife and forcing her to drive him to the foster center.

Chucky stabs Grace to death and captures Andy. Kyle pursues them through the streets and to the nearby Play Pals factory, but is unable to find them before Chucky knocks Andy unconscious and completes the ritual. However, the spell fails as he has spent too much time in his doll body and is now permanently trapped, much to his despair. Chucky chases Andy and Kyle through the factory. Chucky gets his wrist broken from a gate which causes him to rip his hand off and replace it with a knife. After Chucky murders a factory technician, Kyle and Andy mutilate his body with assembly line equipment. Chucky manages to escape, and he uses the corpse of the factory technician, to attack Kyle, which makes Kyle pass out. Andy opens an emergency release valve, showering Chucky with scalding hot molten plastic and seemingly killing him.

After saving the passed out Kyle from being killed on a conveyor belt, the two approach the half-melted Chucky, who suddenly springs back to life. Kyle shoves a high-pressure air hose into his mouth, inflating his head until it explodes, finally killing him. Andy and Kyle exit the factory, unsure of where to go.

== Cast ==
- Alex Vincent as Andy Barclay
- Brad Dourif as the voice of Chucky
  - Ed Gale (in-suit performer)
- Christine Elise as Kyle
- Jenny Agutter as Joanne Simpson
- Gerrit Graham as Phil Simpson
- Grace Zabriskie as Grace Poole
- Peter Haskell as Haskell Sullivan
- Beth Grant as Miss Kettlewell
- Greg Germann as Mattson
- Edan Gross as Tommy Doll
- Charles Meshack as Van Driver

== Production ==
United Artists purchased the script to the original Child's Play partially because UA President Tony Thomopoulis and MGM/UA Communications Chairman Lee Rich believed that it had the potential for multiple sequels. Producer David Kirschner asked Tom Holland to return as director, but Holland declined due to conflicts with Kirschner and UA during production of the first film. John Lafia, who had been turned down as director because he had no experience, was hired by Kirschner after directing The Blue Iguana. Mancini also agreed to return. Mancini and Lafia decided to set the film at a foster home due to Lafia's experience living in a large family. MGM/UA also commissioned a screenplay from Mark Patrick Carducci in case it was dissatisfied with Mancini's script, but it was not used. Carducci's script would have involved Andy in a mental institution after the murders in the first film.

The sequel was in pre-production and was set to begin filming on October 15, 1989, when UA President Richard Berger told producer David Kirschner that the film was put on hold as the studio was about to be acquired by the Australian group Qintex, whose director Christopher Skase intended to ban the studio from producing horror films.

Paramount Pictures, Warner Bros., Columbia Pictures, 20th Century Fox, The Price Company, Carolco, New Line Cinema, The Walt Disney Company, and Universal Pictures expressed interest in picking up the film rights to the series and sequel. Disney, which was working with Kirschner to develop Hocus Pocus (1993), was especially interested in purchasing the series under its Touchstone Pictures label because it wanted to create a horror-themed attraction at its Disney-MGM Studios theme park. However, Universal won the rights bid after Steven Spielberg and Kathleen Kennedy assisted Universal's Sid Sheinberg in convincing Kirschner to accept a negative pickup deal with the studio.

Originally the film was intended to open with a courtroom scene of a jury sentencing Karen Barclay to a mental institution for insisting that Chucky was alive, and both Catherine Hicks and Chris Sarandon were intended to reprise their roles as Karen and Detective Mike Norris from the first film. Sarandon recalled to People in 2023 that he declined to return when asked because Holland would not be involved. However, their scenes were cut from the scripts because of budgetary constraints, and as a result of their omission the film is much shorter than the other installments in the series. The courtroom scene was recycled as the ending of Curse of Chucky in 2013. It also would have contained a scene where Chucky's remains were held in a police evidence locker alongside Jason Voorhees and Michael Myers's masks, an idea which came to be reused in Bride of Chucky in 1998.

Jenny Agutter was cast as Joanne Simpson after Veronica Cartwright was considered. Gerrit Graham beat Jeffrey Jones, Tim Matheson, and Charles Grodin for the role of Phil Simpson. Shannen Doherty, Kristy Swanson, Holly Marie Combs, and Christine Elise all auditioned for the role of Kyle. Although Elise nearly missed her follow-up audition to film an episode of Baywatch, she got the role.

Principal photography began on November 6, 1989, with a $12 million budget. Since Kirschner was busy after getting hired to run Hanna-Barbera, the production was supervised by Robert Latham Brown. Unlike the first film which was mostly shot on-location in Chicago, most of the second film was shot on Universal Studios Lot in Universal City, California. The Play Pals factory sequence was shot in an abandoned warehouse in Valencia, California. Brad Dourif recorded all of his dialogue as Chucky in advance, which allowed his words to match up with his facial movements better than in the first film. Kevin Yagher returned to do the special effects and puppetry, directing several scenes of the film himself. Ed Gale was rehired to play the body of Chucky, but unlike in the first film very few of his scenes were used. The International Alliance of Theatrical Stage Employees picketed the shoot to demand that the production company stop using non-union employees, with the crew voting to sign a union contract in January 1990 shortly before filming wrapped. Graeme Revell, whose only scoring experience was the 1989 Australian psychological horror film Dead Calm, was hired to compose the music after lying to the studio that he had composed an orchestral composition before. Kevin Carlson, Van Snowden, and N. Brock Winkless IV were credited as part of the puppeteers of Chucky.

== Music ==
The score of the film was composed by Graeme Revell, conducted and orchestrated by Shirley Walker and performed by the Hollywood Studio Symphony. Unlike the first film that has electronic music, the music for the sequel is completely orchestral with electronic elements.

== Novelization ==
A tie-in novelization to the film was later written by Matthew J. Costello. The author added in some of his own developments exclusive to the novel, such as going deeper into Andy Barclay and Chucky's perspectives, even delving into Chucky's past. Chucky is characterized to have an absent father and his abusive, alcoholic mother being a dwarf. After being repeatedly teased for this, Chucky later strangled his mother to death at 13 and buried her in the local park. Also, Chucky remembers being put in special classes when he was younger. During the scene at the factory, Chucky sees a bunch of Good Guy dolls and wishes that he could bring them to life to do his bidding. This was partially used as the plot of the film Cult of Chucky.

== Reception ==
=== Box office ===
The film opened at number one in the US with an opening weekend gross of $10,718,520 from 1,996 screens in the United States. The film grossed a total of $28,501,605 domestically and an additional $7.3 million internationally for a worldwide gross of $35.8 million.

=== Critical response ===
On the review aggregator website Rotten Tomatoes, 53% of 17 critics' reviews are positive. Metacritic, which uses a weighted average, assigned the film a score of 37 out of 100, based on 16 critics, indicating "generally unfavorable" reviews. Evan Dickson of Bloody Disgusting, in describing how it surpasses the original film, wrote, "Child's Play 2 manages to strip away all artifice and still manage to be an effective slasher."

Variety wrote, "Child's Play 2 is another case of rehashing the few novel elements of an original to the point of utter numbness." Gene Siskel gave the film zero stars out of four, calling it "A vicious, ugly little thriller." On Siskel and Ebert's Worst of 1990 show, Siskel further criticised the film, accusing director John Lafia of "prostituting himself" and rhetorically asking the audience "who was this trash made for and would you want to sit next to them in a theater?"

Kevin Thomas of the Los Angeles Times thought the original was "a terrific one-of-a-kind thriller," but "Not so the sequel. It's an all-out horror film—handsomely produced but morbid and not in the least amusing to watch." Richard Harrington of The Washington Post called it "an inevitable sequel that's not as good as its progenitor, but better than most movies with the numbers 2 through 8 in their titles."

=== Home media ===
Child's Play 2 was first released on VHS by MCA/Universal Home Video in North America on April 11, 1991. The film was later released on DVD in 1999 and bundled with the fourth film Bride of Chucky. This released on DVD by Universal Pictures Home Entertainment on October 22, 2002. It was released in multiple collections, such as:

- The Chucky Collection (alongside Child's Play 3 and Bride of Chucky), released on October 7, 2003.
- Chucky – The Killer DVD Collection (alongside Child's Play 3, Bride and Seed of Chucky), released on September 19, 2006.
- Chucky: The Complete Collection (alongside Child's Play and 3, Bride, Seed and Curse of Chucky), released on October 8, 2013.
- Chucky: Complete 7-Movie Collection (alongside Child's Play and 3, Bride, Seed, Curse and Cult of Chucky), released on October 3, 2017.

Child's Play 2 was released on 4K Ultra HD by Scream! Factory on August 16, 2022. This release included a new 4K scan from the original camera negative, a new Dolby Atmos track and several interviews recorded in 2022 with creator Don Mancini, actor Alex Vincent, producer David Kirschner, actress Christine Elise, actress Beth Grant, and executive producer Robert Latham Brown.

== Sequels ==
The film was followed by Child's Play 3 in 1991, Bride of Chucky in 1998, Seed of Chucky in 2004, Curse of Chucky in 2013, Cult of Chucky in 2017, and the TV series Chucky in 2021.
