= Child's Play 3 =

1991 film by Jack Bender

- Theatrical release poster
- Directed by: Jack Bender
- Written by: Don Mancini
- Based on: Characters by Don Mancini
- Produced by: Robert Latham Brown
- Starring: Justin Whalin; Perrey Reeves; Jeremy Sylvers
- Cinematography: John R. Leonetti
- Edited by: Scott Wallace; Edward A. Warschilka Jr.
- Music by: Cory Lerios; John D'Andrea
- Production company: Universal Pictures
- Distributed by: Universal Pictures
- Release date: August 30, 1991
- Running time: 90 minutes
- Country: United States
- Language: English
- Budget: $13 million
- Box office: $20.5 million

Child's Play 3 is a 1991 American supernatural slasher film written by Don Mancini and directed by Jack Bender. It serves as a sequel to Child's Play 2 (1990) and the third installment in the Child's Play franchise. The film stars Justin Whalin, Perrey Reeves, Jeremy Sylvers, and Brad Dourif reprising his role as Chucky.

It was executive-produced by David Kirschner, who produced the first two Child's Play films. Although released only nine months after Child's Play 2, the story takes place eight years following the events of that film. The film follows a now 16 year old Andy Barclay enrolling at Kent Military School who has unknowingly been followed by a revived Chucky, who sets his sight on a younger kid cadet Ronald Tyler.

Released on August 30, 1991, in the United States by Universal Pictures, Child's Play 3 received generally negative reviews from critics and grossed $20.5 million worldwide against a budget of $13 million, being the lowest-grossing film in the series. The film became notorious in the United Kingdom when it was suggested it might have inspired the real-life murder of a British child, James Bulger, suggestions rejected by officers investigating the case. A sequel, Bride of Chucky, was released seven years later in 1998.

== Plot ==
Eight years after Chucky's second demise, (Note: As depicted in Child's Play 2.) the Play Pals company resumes manufacturing Good Guy dolls and re-opens their abandoned factory. As Chucky's corpse is being removed from the building, a splash of his blood inadvertently falls into the molten plastic being used to produce the dolls, reviving him in a new body. Chucky tortures and murders Play Pals CEO Mr. Sullivan using various children's toys, and then uses his computer records to locate Andy Barclay.

Now 16, Andy, whose mother, Karen got committed to the psychiatric hospital for the second time, has been sent to Kent Military School after "failing to cope in several other foster homes". Colonel Cochrane, the school's commandant, advises Andy to forget his "fantasies" about the doll. Andy befriends cadets Ronald Tyler, an 8-year-old boy; Harold Aubrey Whitehurst, a cowardly young man; and Kristin De Silva, for whom he develops romantic feelings. He also meets Brett C. Shelton, a sadistic cadet lieutenant colonel who routinely bullies the cadets.

Tyler is asked to deliver a package to Andy's room. Tyler realizes that the package contains a Good Guy doll and takes it to the school's weapons armory to open it. Chucky bursts from the package and is incensed to find Tyler instead of Andy. However, remembering he can possess the first person who learns his true identity, he tells Tyler his secret. Before Chucky can enact the voodoo soul-swapping ritual to possess Tyler, Cochrane interrupts them and confiscates the doll, throwing it into a garbage truck. Chucky escapes by luring the driver into the truck's compactor and crushing him to death.

That night, Chucky attacks Andy and tells him his plans for taking over Tyler's body. Before Andy can fight back, Shelton comes in and takes the doll from him. Andy then sneaks into Shelton's room to recover it; Shelton awakens to confront him, only to find that Chucky has vanished. Suspecting the doll was stolen, Shelton forces all the cadets to do exercises as punishment. Chucky attempts to possess Tyler again, but they are interrupted by De Silva and fellow cadet Ivers. Later, a knife-wielding Chucky surprises Cochrane, unintentionally shocking him into a fatal heart attack. The next morning, Andy tries to convince Tyler that Chucky is evil, but Tyler refuses to believe him. Meanwhile, Chucky kills the camp barber Sergeant Botnick by slashing his throat with a straight razor. Whitehurst witnesses Botnick's murder and flees in terror.

Despite Cochrane's death, the school's annual war games are ordered to proceed as planned, with cadets divided between a "Red Team" and "Blue Team". Andy, Whitehurst (now too frightened to talk after witnessing Chucky's action), and Shelton are assigned to the Blue Team. Chucky secretly replaces the paint bullets of the Red team with live ammunition. When the simulation begins, Chucky lures Tyler away from his team. Finally realizing that Chucky is evil, Tyler stabs him with a pocket knife and flees to find Andy. Chucky then attacks De Silva and holds her hostage, forcing Andy to exchange Tyler for De Silva. The Blue team and Red team arrive on the scene and open fire; Shelton is killed by a bullet from the Red team while Tyler escapes in the chaos. Chucky tosses a grenade at the quarrelling cadets; Whitehurst leaps on top of the grenade, sacrificing himself to save the others.

Tyler flees to a nearby carnival where Chucky kills a security guard and captures him again. Andy and De Silva arrive soon after and take the security guard's gun. They follow Chucky and Tyler into a horror-themed roller-coaster. Chucky wounds De Silva; she gives Andy the gun and tells him to save Tyler. Andy pursues Chucky deeper into the ride and repeatedly shoots him when Chucky tries a third time to possess Tyler, saving Tyler. Chucky revives and attacks again. In the struggle, Andy manages to throw him into a massive metal fan, shredding his body apart and finally killing him. De Silva is rushed to the hospital while Andy is taken away by police for questioning.

== Cast ==
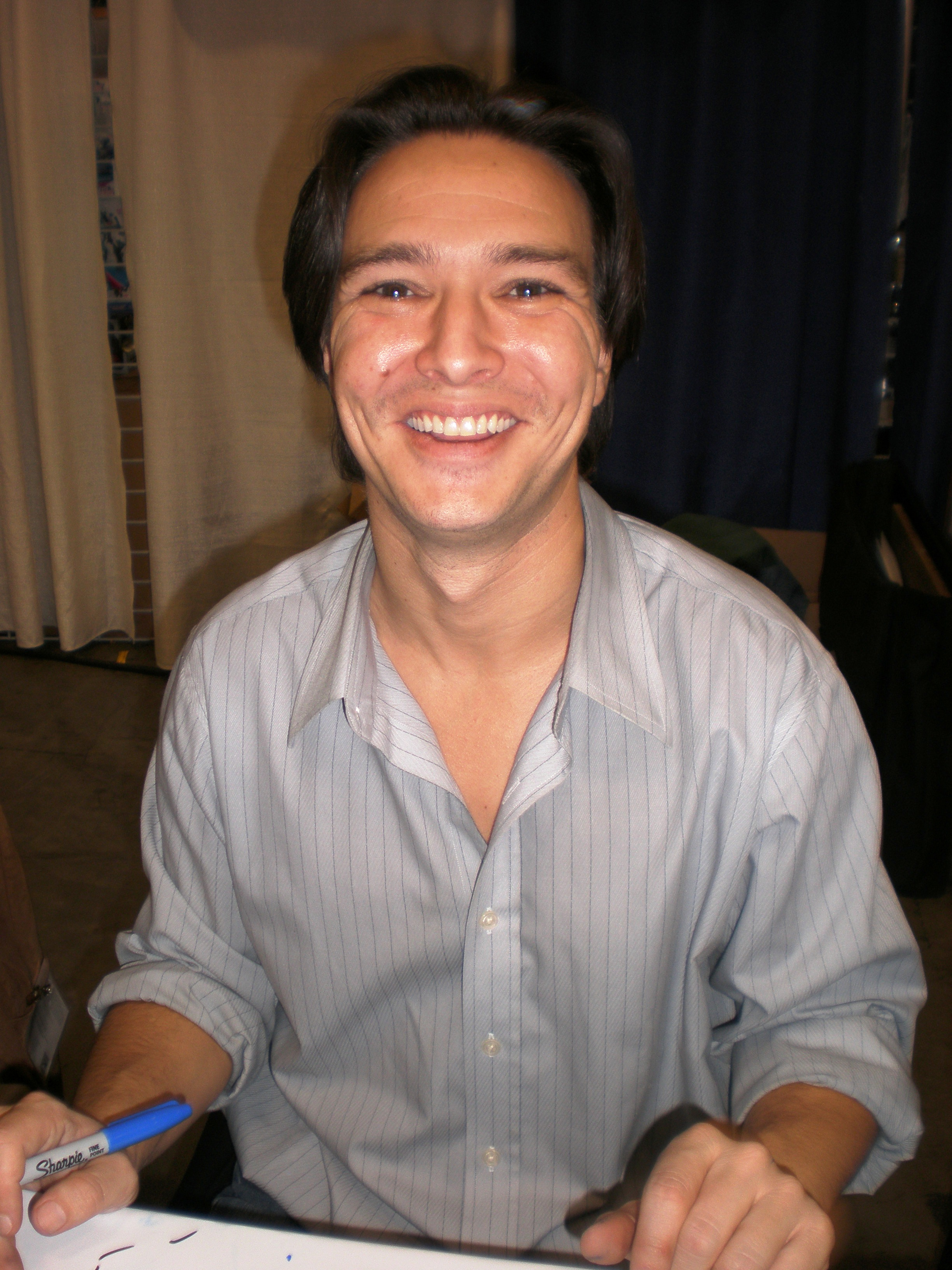
Justin Whalin (photographed in 2009) portrays a 16-year-old Andy Barclay in Child's Play 3

- Brad Dourif as the voice of Chucky
- Justin Whalin as Andy Barclay
- Perrey Reeves as Kristin de Silva
- Jeremy Sylvers as Ronald Tyler
- Travis Fine as Cadet Lieutenant Colonel Brett C. Shelton
- Dean Jacobson as Harold Aubrey Whitehurst
- Peter Haskell as Sullivan
- Dakin Matthews as Colonel Francis Cochrane
- Andrew Robinson as Sergeant Botnick
- Burke Byrnes as Sergeant Clark
- Matthew Walker as Ellis
- Donna Eskra as Jackie Ivers
- Edan Gross as the voice of Good Guy doll
- Terry Wills as Garbage Man
- Richard Marion as Patterson
- Laura Owens as Lady Executive
- Ron Fassler as Petzold
- Michael Chieffo as Security Guard
- Henry G. Sanders as Major

== Production ==
Universal Studios had Don Mancini begin writing the third installment for the series before Child's Play 2 was released, causing pressure on him to draft a storyline on such a tight schedule. The film was formally greenlit after the successful release of its predecessor with a release date nine months away.

Mancini initially wanted to introduce the concept of "multiple Chuckys" in the movie, but due to budget constraints the idea was eventually scrapped. Mancini later used this concept for the 2017 sequel Cult of Chucky. It also was intended to open with a scene of a security guard portrayed by John Ritter frightening off a group of trespassing children at the Good Guys factory by telling them scary stories about Chucky. Alex Vincent, who portrayed Andy in the previous films, did not reprise his role due to the film having a time jump eight years after Child's Play 2. After Mancini decided to make Andy Barclay 16 years old, he considered recasting the role with Jonathan Brandis before hiring Justin Whalin. Before Jack Bender became director, Mancini wanted to hire Peter Jackson.

Principal photography began on February 4, 1991, at the Kemper Military School in Boonville, Missouri. Further filming took place in California at Los Angeles and the Universal Studios Lot in Universal City. The carnival scenes were filmed in Valencia, California. The puppeteers made the doll speak using computer technology to control its mouth movements to align with Dourif's prerecorded dialogue. N. Brock Winkless IV returned to work as one of Chucky's puppeteers, as did Van Snowden.

== Release and reception ==
=== Box-office ===
Child's Play 3 opened in second place at the US box office behind Dead Again with $5.7 million over the 4-day 1991 Labor Day weekend, which the Los Angeles Times called "slow numbers", however, it was the top-grossing Labor Day opening at the time, beating the record $4.6 million held by Bolero since 1984. It finished its theatrical run with $15 million in the US and Canada, and a total of $20.5 million worldwide.

=== Critical response ===
On Rotten Tomatoes, the film has an approval rating of 19% based on reviews from 16 critics, and an average rating is 4.20/10, making it the poorest reviewed film in the series on the site. On Metacritic it has a score of 27% based on reviews from 13 critics, indicating "generally unfavorable" reviews.

Chris Hicks of the Deseret News called it "perverse" and criticized the film's plot. Caryn James of The New York Times called the Chucky doll "an impressive technological achievement" but said the film "misses the sharpness and dark humor" of the original film. Variety called it a "noisy, mindless sequel" with good acting. Richard Harrington of The Washington Post wrote, "Chucky himself is an animatronic delight, but one suspects the film's energies and budget have all been devoted to what is essentially a one-trick pony." Stephen Wigle of The Baltimore Sun called it "fun for any fan of the slasher genre".

Series creator Don Mancini said that this was his least favorite entry in the series, adding that he ran out of ideas after the second film. He elaborated further in 2013 stating that he was not pleased with the casting, feeling Jeremy Sylvers was too old for the role of Tyler and Dakin Matthews was not the "R. Lee Ermey" archetype he was looking for in Colonel Cochrane. In a 2017 interview, director Jack Bender also dismissed the film by calling it "kinda silly". In October 2021, Perrey Reeves, who plays De Silva in the film, expressed interest in reprising her role as the character in the TV series Chucky.

In the years since its release, Child’s Play 3 has received a critical re-evaluation from retrospective critics and fans. Its unique setting, tone, climax and Dourif's performance has been praised and is considered by some to be one of the more superior films in the series, being compared to later, more comical and criticized entries like Seed of Chucky (2004).

=== Awards ===
This film was nominated at the Saturn Award as Best Horror Film and Justin Whalin was nominated as Best Performance by a Younger Actor for his performance in this film. Andrew Robinson was nominated as Best Supporting Actor at the Fangoria Chainsaw Award.

=== Home media ===
Child's Play 3 was originally released on home video in North America on March 12, 1992, and on DVD on October 7, 2003. It was also released in multiple collections, including The Chucky Collection (alongside Child's Play 2 and Bride of Chucky), released on October 7, 2003; Chucky – The Killer DVD Collection (alongside Child's Play 2, Bride and Seed of Chucky), released on September 19, 2006; Chucky: The Complete Collection (alongside Child's Play 1 and 2, Bride, Seed and Curse of Chucky), released on October 8, 2013; and Chucky: Complete 7-Movie Collection (alongside Child's Play 1 and 2, Bride, Seed, Curse and Cult of Chucky), released on October 3, 2017.

Child's Play 3 was released on 4K Ultra HD by Scream! Factory on August 16, 2022. This release included a new 4K scan from the original camera negative, a new Dolby Atmos track and several interviews recorded in 2022 with creator Don Mancini, actress Perry Reeves, executive producer David Kirschner, executive producer Robert Latham Brown, actor Michael Chieffo, makeup artist Craig Reardon and production designer Richard Sawyer.

== The murder of James Bulger ==
A suggested link with the film was made after the murder of James Bulger. The killers, who were ten years old at the time, were said to have imitated a scene in which one of Chucky's victims is splashed with blue paint. Psychologist Guy Cumberbatch stated, "The link with a video was that the father of one of the boys – Jon Venables – had rented Child's Play 3 some months earlier." However, the police officer who directed the investigation, Albert Kirby, found that the son, Jon, was not living with his father at the time and was unlikely to have seen the film. Moreover, the boy disliked horror films, a point later confirmed by psychiatric reports. Thus the police investigation, which had specifically looked for a video link, concluded there was none. However, the judge, Justice Morland, said in his comments that the murder had "some striking similarities" to the film and that "grave crimes by young children" could be caused by reasons including exposure to violent video films "including possibly Child's Play 3". Following the trial, the Association of Video Retailers in the UK recommended that its members voluntarily remove the trilogy from their shelves.

The film remained controversial in Europe, and both Sky Television in the United Kingdom and Canal+ in Spain refused to broadcast the film as regular programming and the case led to new legislation for video films.

== Sequels ==
The film was followed by Bride of Chucky in 1998, Seed of Chucky in 2004, Curse of Chucky in 2013, Cult of Chucky in 2017, and the TV series Chucky in 2021.

== Other media ==
=== Novelization ===
A tie-in novel was later written by Matthew J. Costello. Just like Child's Play 2, the author included expanded character perspectives, specifically Andy Barclay, Chucky and Tyler, while adapting moments from earlier drafts of the screenplay. In the beginning of the novel, a rat scours for food in the abandoned Play Pals factory and, smelling blood within the plastic, chews on Chucky's remains. Blood then leaks out of the remains and somehow leaks onto another doll.

Whitehurst is characterized as overweight and this is the main source of his being bullied in the novel.

Chucky's death is also different. While defending Tyler on an exterior ride, Andy grapples with Chucky before finally shooting him several times, causing the doll's body to fall from the ride. Andy watches the head shatter to blood, metal and plastic on the ground.

=== Halloween Horror Nights ===
In 2009, the climax of Child's Play 3 received its own maze at Universal Studios' Halloween Horror Nights, entitled Chucky's Fun House.

== See also ==
- Dolly Dearest, another 1991 horror movie about a killer doll released two months after Child's Play 3
