= Child's Play (2019 film) =

2019 film by Lars Klevberg

- Theatrical release poster
- Directed by: Lars Klevberg
- Screenplay by: Tyler Burton Smith
- Based on: Child's Play by: Don Mancini; John Lafia; Tom Holland
- Produced by: David Katzenberg; Seth Grahame-Smith
- Starring: Aubrey Plaza; Gabriel Bateman; Brian Tyree Henry; Mark Hamill
- Cinematography: Brendan Uegama
- Edited by: Tom Elkins
- Music by: Bear McCreary
- Production companies: Orion Pictures; KatzSmith Productions
- Distributed by: United Artists Releasing
- Release date: June 21, 2019
- Running time: 90 minutes
- Country: United States
- Language: English
- Budget: $10 million
- Box office: $44.9 million

Child's Play is a 2019 American horror film directed by Lars Klevberg from a screenplay written by Tyler Burton Smith. It serves as a remake of the 1988 eponymous film and is the eighth installment in the Child's Play franchise. The film stars Aubrey Plaza, Gabriel Bateman, Brian Tyree Henry, and Mark Hamill as the voice of Chucky. It follows a family terrorized by a high-tech doll that malfunctions and becomes subsequently hostile and murderous.

Plans for a Child's Play remake began in the early 2010s, with original Chucky voice actor Brad Dourif set to reprise the role. However, it was turned down and the project entered development hell. By 2018, Metro-Goldwyn-Mayer announced a remake with a different creative team than the original film series. Klevberg signed on as director from a script by Burton Smith, saying in an interview he drew inspiration from the 1982 science fiction film, E.T. the Extra-Terrestrial. Principal photography for the film began in September 2018 and wrapped in November in Vancouver, British Columbia.

Child's Play premiered in Paris on June 18, 2019, before being theatrically released in the United States and Canada three days later by Orion Pictures through United Artists Releasing and Elevation Pictures respectively. The film grossed $44.9 million worldwide against a $10 million budget and received mixed reviews from critics.

== Plot ==
Multinational Kaslan Corporation has just launched Buddi, a revolutionary line of high-tech dolls designed to be lifelong companions to their owners, learning from their surroundings, and acting accordingly via artificial intelligence. It quickly becomes a worldwide success. At a Kaslan assembly factory in Vietnam, an overworked employee is fired and verbally abused by his supervisor. In retaliation, he sabotages a Buddi doll by disabling all of its safety protocols before committing suicide.

In Chicago, widowed retail clerk Karen Barclay and her twelve-year-old hearing-impaired son Andy have moved into a new apartment after the death of her husband. In an attempt to cheer Andy up about the relocation and the presence of her new boyfriend Shane, Karen blackmails her boss to procure a defective Buddi doll; it is revealed to be the tampered one. Once activated, the doll names himself "Chucky" and becomes attached to Andy. Chucky helps him befriend two other children, Falyn and Pugg, but also begins to display violent tendencies.

Chucky kills the Barclays' pet cat after it scratches Andy and then terrorizes Shane, which leads him to rudely confront Andy. Misunderstanding Andy's pleas for Shane to disappear, Chucky follows him to his home, where it is revealed that Shane is married with children. Chucky breaks Shane's legs and activates a cultivator that scalps and kills him. He delivers Shane's skinned face as a gift to a horrified Andy.

As police detective Mike Norris begins an investigation, Andy, Falyn, and Pugg disable Chucky and throw him into the garbage. Voyeur electrician Gabe finds and fixes the doll, who then kills him with a table saw. Meanwhile, Andy fails to convince Karen that the doll has become murderous. She takes him along to her job at the local shopping mall to keep an eye on him. When Chucky kills Norris' mother Doreen in a controlled car crash, Norris suspects that Andy is responsible for the murders and arrests him just as Chucky takes full control of the mall.

Chaos is unleashed as employees and customers are brutally killed by rampaging Buddi dolls that Chucky has activated. Norris is wounded amid the massacre while Andy and his friends escape. However, Andy is forced to return when Chucky reveals that he is holding Karen hostage in the mall's storage. Andy saves his mother before Norris shoots Chucky down and Karen beheads him, both realizing Andy was telling the truth. As the police and paramedics tend to Karen, Norris, and other survivors outside the mall, Andy and his friends burn Chucky's body in a nearby alleyway.

In the aftermath of Chucky's killing spree, Kaslan CEO Henry Kaslan announces a massive Buddi dolls recall. As one of the dolls is placed into storage, his eyes flicker red and he smiles, revealing that Chucky transferred his artificial intelligence into a new body.

== Cast ==
- Aubrey Plaza as Karen Barclay
- Gabriel Bateman as Andy Barclay
- Brian Tyree Henry as Detective Mike Norris
- Mark Hamill as the voice of Chucky
- Tim Matheson as Henry Kaslan
- Beatrice Kitsos as Falyn
- Ty Consiglio as Pugg
- Marlon Kazadi as Omar
- David Lewis as Shane
- Carlease Burke as Doreen Norris
- Trent Redekop as Gabe
- Amro Majzoub as Wes
- Nicole Anthony as Detective Willis
- Phoenix Ly as Chien

== Production ==
In the early 2010s, before Curse of Chucky started its development, a planned remake for the original 1988 Child's Play was announced, with Brad Dourif set to reprise his role as Chucky. There is not much information about the remake, but it was subsequently cancelled. Metro-Goldwyn-Mayer announced the development of a Child's Play remake in July 2018, with a different creative team than the original film series.

Polaroid director Lars Klevberg signed on, with a script by Tyler Burton Smith, following his work in Quantum Break. It and It Chapter Two collaborative team Seth Grahame-Smith and David Katzenberg served as producers. Gabriel Bateman, Aubrey Plaza, and Brian Tyree Henry were announced to star in September, followed by Ty Consiglio and Beatrice Kitsos in November. Mark Hamill was cast to voice Chucky, replacing Dourif. Grahame-Smith elaborated on Hamill's casting in an interview with Entertainment Weekly:

We asked, thinking there was no way it would ever happen, and he said, 'Yes'. He was the first choice, a big swing, and it just happened... I mean, first of all, to have an icon reimagining an iconic character is an incredible gift, and to have an actor and a voice performer who is as celebrated as Mark Hamill, and as gifted as he is, I mean it's incredible. He's taking on this challenge with a huge amount of energy and really come at it in a very serious way. And it's really something to watch him create a character, and sort of embody it, and I get to sit there and watch Mark Hamill record. It's just incredible.

Principal photography began on September 17 and wrapped on November 8, 2018, in Vancouver, Canada. Reshoots occurred on December 15–16 and in April 2019. MastersFX, a visual effects company, took six weeks to prepare and assemble seven practical animatronic puppets, each with interchangeable arms and heads that performed a variety of required actions on set, with some help from Pixomondo, who provided the CGI for the film. Bear McCreary composed the score through a "toy orchestra" inspired by "Chucky's toy-store origins" with toy pianos, hurdy-gurdies, accordions, plastic guitars and otamatones. The soundtrack was released by Waxwork Records on vinyl which featured liner notes by the composer.

== Marketing ==
The first official image of Chucky was released on September 29, 2018. The teaser poster was released on November 12, revealing that for the film's adaptation the Good Guys dolls would be called Buddy referencing the My Buddy doll that influenced the original character's design. A WiFi symbol over the "i" in "Buddi" teases the character's hi-tech functions, being similar to robot toys, such as Furby and RoboSapien. Orion Pictures launched a marketing website for the fictional Kaslan Corporation, ahead of the film's release. The first trailer premiered on February 8, 2019, with the release of The Prodigy.

The film's theatrical poster and a second trailer were released in April 2019. A behind-the-scenes video was uploaded to Orion Pictures' YouTube channel on May 16, which shows how Chucky was brought to life for the film. Beginning in April, several posters alluding to Toy Story 4 were released, featuring Chucky brutally killing characters of the animated franchise, using the Toy Story 4's teaser posters' background. Both films had June 21, 2019 releases. On June 24, a poster was unveiled to coincide with the release of Annabelle Comes Home, featuring Chucky killing the Annabelle doll.

== Release ==
=== Theatrical ===
The film was released in the United States on June 21, 2019. It is the first film from Orion Pictures to be released through United Artists Releasing.

=== Home media ===
The film was released digitally on September 10, and on Blu-ray and DVD on September 24 by 20th Century Fox Home Entertainment.

On March 19, 2024, Scream Factory reissued the film on Ultra HD Blu-ray as part of their collector's edition reissues of the Child's Play films, utilizing a new 4K remaster with Dolby Vision & HDR grading.

== Reception ==
=== Box office ===
Child's Play grossed $29.2 million in the United States and Canada, and $15.8 million in other territories, for a worldwide total of $44.9 million, against a production budget of $10 million.

In the United States and Canada, Child's Play was released alongside Toy Story 4 and Anna, and was projected to gross $16–18 million from 3,007 theaters in its opening weekend. It made $6.1 million on its first day, including $1.65 million from Thursday night previews. It went on to debut to $14.1 million, and finished second, behind Toy Story 4. The film dropped 68.6% in its second weekend to $4.4 million, falling to eighth.

=== Critical response ===
On review aggregator Rotten Tomatoes, the film holds an approval rating of 64% based on 208 reviews, with an average rating of 5.8/10. The site's critical consensus reads: "Child's Play updates an '80s horror icon for the Internet of Things era, with predictably gruesome – and generally entertaining – results." Metacritic, which uses a weighted average, assigned the film a score of 48 out of 100, based on 35 critics, indicating "mixed or average" reviews. Audiences polled by CinemaScore gave the film an average grade of "C+" on an A+ to F scale, tied with Seed of Chucky for the lowest score of the series.

Nick Allen of RogerEbert.com gave the film three out of four stars, calling it "nastier, more playful, and just as good if not better than the original film." Peter Bradshaw from The Guardian gave the film a positive review, with 4/5 stars, calling it a "razor-sharp and exquisitely gruesome toy story". Jeremy Dick from MovieWeb also liked the film, writing "Simply put, Child's Play is the perfect horror movie remake and should now serve as a prime example of what others should do. It's highly entertaining and tons of fun, and I say that as a huge fan of the original".

Peter Travers of Rolling Stone gave the film 2 out of 5 stars, writing, "MIA is the original's perverse originality... in a misguided satire of the digital era and millennial consumerism". Variety's Peter Debruge was also negative, stating, "This is the new normal for horror movies: The screenplays have to seem hipper than the premise they represent, which puts Child's Play in the weird position of pointing out and poking fun at all the ways it fails to make sense."

Don Mancini, who created the franchise, admitted that his feelings were hurt by the film being made without his approval. Mancini was quoted saying:

"MGM retained the rights to the first movie, so they're rebooting that. They asked David Kirschner and I if we wanted to be executive producers. We said no thank you, because we have our ongoing thriving business with Chucky. Obviously my feelings were hurt. Ya know, I had just done two movies... forgive me if I sound defensive, (they) were both at 83 percent on Rotten Tomatoes. Even though they didn't get theatrical releases, they were well regarded. And I did create the character and nurture the franchise for three f-king decades."

Other franchise mainstays such as Jennifer Tilly and Christine Elise have criticized the film as well.

== Possible sequel ==
At WonderCon, Grahame-Smith said that if the film does well, they would love to make a sequel. Director Lars Klevberg discussed his ideas for a possible sequel.

"For me, this was just trying to make this the best movie possible. Like, never foreshadowing any detailed plan of where you want to go as a franchise. But yeah, for me I think I love the Buddi bear concept".

In July 2020, Klevberg said he would love to make a sequel, but due to Don Mancini creating the Chucky television series, it was unlikely.
