= Child's Play (franchise) =

American media franchise

- Child's Play logo as used in the original film (top) and the Chucky logo (bottom)
- Created by: Don Mancini
- Original work: Child's Play (1988)
- Owners: Metro-Goldwyn-Mayer (Amazon MGM Studios) (1988 film & 2019 reboot only) (Note: Metro-Goldwyn-Mayer own the rights to the 1988 film and the 2019 reboot, with the later being produced and distributed through their subsidiaries Orion Pictures and United Artists Releasing.); Universal Pictures (from 1990 onwards) (Note: Universal Pictures own the rights to all installments of the franchise, except the 1988 film and the 2019 reboot. It also distributed Seed of Chucky through their subsidiaries Rogue Pictures/Focus Features.)
- Years: 1988–present

Print publications
- Novels: List of novels
- Comics: List of comics

Films and television
- Films: List of films
- Short films: Chucky's Vacation Slides (2005); Chucky Invades (2013)
- Television series: Chucky (2021–2024)

Games
- Video game: Chucky: Slash & Dash (2013)

Miscellaneous
- Theme park attractions: List of theme park attractions

Child's Play (also known colloquially as Chucky) is an American slasher media franchise created by Don Mancini. The films primarily focus on Chucky (voiced by Brad Dourif in the original films and television series, and Mark Hamill in the remake), a notorious serial killer who frequently escapes death by performing a voodoo ritual to transfer his soul into a "Good Guys" doll. The original film, Child's Play, was released on November 9, 1988. The film has spawned six sequels, a television series, a remake, novels, comic books, a video game, and tie-in merchandise. The first, second, and fourth films were box office successes with all of the films earning over $182 million worldwide. Including revenues from sales of videos, DVDs, VOD and merchandise, the franchise has generated over $250 million.

Several short films have been made featuring the Chucky character: on the DVD release of Seed of Chucky, a short film entitled Chucky's Vacation Slides, set after the shooting of the film, was included, and a series of short films inserting Chucky into the events of other horror films entitled Chucky Invades was released in the run-up to the release of Curse of Chucky. On television, Chucky has appeared in commercials and also on Saturday Night Live, with a separate voice actor voicing the character. Chucky appeared in a pre-taped segment during an October 1998 episode of World Championship Wrestling's Monday Nitro program as a heel, taunting wrestler Rick Steiner who was a face at the time and promoting Bride of Chucky. He later appeared on WWE's NXT program for the special "Halloween Havoc" episodes in October 2021 and 2022, in which Chucky served as a host to announce several of the matches. These appearances were to promote the Chucky television series, which began airing on October 12, 2021, on Syfy and USA Network.

== Films ==
Film	U.S. release date	Director(s)	Screenwriter(s)	Producer(s)	Distributed by
Original series
Child's Play	November 9, 1988	Tom Holland	Don Mancini; John Lafia; Tom Holland	David Kirschner	United Artists
Child's Play 2	November 9, 1990	John Lafia	Don Mancini	David Kirschner	Universal Pictures
Child's Play 3	August 30, 1991	Jack Bender	Don Mancini	Robert Latham Brown	Universal Pictures
Bride of Chucky	October 16, 1998	Ronny Yu	Don Mancini	David Kirschner; Grace Gilroy	Universal Pictures
Seed of Chucky	November 11, 2004	Don Mancini	Don Mancini	David Kirschner; Corey Sienega	Rogue Pictures
Curse of Chucky	September 24, 2013 (Note: The film originally debuted on VOD before later being released on DVD and Blu-ray.)	Don Mancini	Don Mancini	David Kirschner	Universal Pictures
Cult of Chucky	October 3, 2017	Don Mancini	Don Mancini	David Kirschner; Ogden Gavanski	Universal Pictures
Untitled Chucky Sequel	TBA	Don Mancini	Don Mancini	TBA	TBA
Reboot
Child's Play	June 21, 2019	Lars Klevberg	Tyler Burton Smith	David Katzenberg; Seth Grahame-Smith	United Artists Releasing

Chucky: Complete 7-Movie Collection (UK Blu-ray set)

=== Child's Play (1988) ===
Directed by Tom Holland from a story by Holland, John Lafia, and Don Mancini, Child's Play was released on November 9, 1988. It was the first film in the series and the only film (not counting the 2019 reboot) to be distributed by Metro-Goldwyn-Mayer/United Artists before the franchise was sold to Universal Pictures. The film starred Catherine Hicks, Chris Sarandon, Alex Vincent in his first film performance, and Brad Dourif.

Gunned down by Detective Mike Norris, dying murderer Charles Lee Ray uses voodoo magic to put his soul inside a doll named Chucky—which Karen Barclay buys for her young son, Andy. Tragedy strikes when Chucky kills Andy's babysitter. The boy then realizes the doll is alive and tries to warn people, but he's institutionalized. Now Karen must convince the detective of the murderous doll's intentions, before Andy becomes Chucky's next victim.

=== Child's Play 2 (1990) ===
Directed by John Lafia, from a story by Don Mancini, and released on November 9, 1990, Child's Play 2 is the second film in the series and the first film produced by Universal Pictures. The film sees Alex Vincent and Brad Dourif reprise their respective roles as Andy Barclay and the voice of Chucky, while Christine Elise plays Andy's foster sister, Kyle.

Two years after serial killer Charles Lee Ray inserted his soul into a Chucky doll, a toy company attempts to re-create the doll, bringing Ray back in the process. The possessed doll, intent on claiming a human body, kills his way toward former owner Andy, who now lives in a foster home. Andy's foster sister, Kyle, tries to protect him, but his foster parents believe Andy is just a troubled kid—and Chucky's murderous path continues.

=== Child's Play 3 (1991) ===
Directed by Jack Bender from a story by Don Mancini and released on August 30, 1991, Child's Play 3 is the third and last film in the series to be titled Child's Play, as all future installments would later use the title Chucky (prior to the 2019 reboot). The film saw Justin Whalin (replacing Alex Vincent) as Andy Barclay, while Perrey Reeves and Jeremy Sylvers play new characters Kristin De Silva and Ronald Tyler. Brad Dourif reprised his role as the voice of Chucky, becoming the only actor to appear in all films and the television series.

It's been years since Chucky, the doll with the soul and the voice of a psychopathic killer, was apparently destroyed at a doll factory. Now Chucky's manufacturer is remaking the same line of toys with the old, still haunted materials. This resurrects Chucky, who goes after Andy, his former owner, who now attends military school. Chucky slashes his way through a string of grotesque murders as Andy tries to stop the homicidal doll and the spirit within it.

=== Bride of Chucky (1998) ===
Directed by Ronny Yu from a story by Don Mancini and released on October 16, 1998, Bride of Chucky is the fourth film in the franchise, and the first film to be titled Chucky. The film once again sees Brad Dourif reprising his role of Chucky, while Jennifer Tilly, Nick Stabile, and Katherine Heigl play new characters. Unlike the first three films, this film focuses almost entirely on the titular dolls.

After being cut apart in the previous film, killer doll Chucky is resurrected by Tiffany, his ex-girlfriend. Following an argument, Chucky kills Tiffany, transferring her soul into a bride doll. To find the magical amulet that can restore them both to human form, Chucky and Tiffany arrange to be driven to New Jersey by Jesse and Jade, a teenage couple who are unaware that their cargo is alive.

=== Seed of Chucky (2004) ===
Directed and written by Don Mancini and released on November 11, 2004, Seed of Chucky is the fifth installment of the series and the second film not to be distributed by Universal Pictures. The film stars Brad Dourif, reprising his role as Chucky, Jennifer Tilly, reprising her role as Tiffany Valentine, while also playing a fictional version of herself, and Billy Boyd as their child, Glen/Glenda.

Gentle Glen is a ventriloquist's dummy, the offspring of evil dolls Chucky and Tiffany, both of whom are now deceased. When the orphaned Glen hears that a film is being made about his parents, he goes to Hollywood and resurrects them in an attempt to get to know them better. He is horrified when his parents embark on a new mass assassination, and Chucky is equally horrified that his son has no taste for evil.

=== Curse of Chucky (2013) ===
Directed and written by Don Mancini and released on October 8, 2013, Curse of Chucky is the sixth film in the series, and the first direct-to-video installment. It stars Brad Dourif, reprising the role from previous films, while his daughter, Fiona Dourif, plays new character Nica Pierce.

Looking for revenge, Chucky the killer doll infiltrates and terrorizes the family of a woman, her sister, and her young niece.

=== Cult of Chucky (2017) ===
Directed and written by Don Mancini, and released on October 3, 2017, Cult of Chucky is the seventh installment and the second direct-to-video film in the franchise. It stars Brad Dourif, Jennifer Tilly, Alex Vincent, and Fiona Dourif, all reprising the roles from previous films in the franchise.

Chucky returns to terrorize his human victim, Nica, who is confined to an asylum for the criminally insane. Meanwhile, the killer doll has some scores to settle with his old enemies, with the help of his former wife.

=== Child's Play (2019) ===
Directed by Lars Klevberg, Child's Play (2019) is a remake and reboot of the original film. It is the first and only film in the franchise to not be written by Don Mancini or feature longtime Chucky actor Brad Dourif. It stars Aubrey Plaza, Gabriel Bateman, and Mark Hamill playing new versions of characters from the original film. In this film, Chucky is not a doll possessed by a serial killer but instead an AI-powered Buddi one.

After moving to a new city, young Andy Barclay receives a special present from his mother—a seemingly innocent Buddi doll that becomes his best friend. When the doll suddenly takes on a life of its own, Andy unites with other neighborhood children to stop the sinister toy from wreaking havoc.

=== Future ===
In October 2017, Don Mancini stated that he intends to have Glen and Glenda from Seed of Chucky return in a future film, and acknowledged that most references to that character had been cut from Cult of Chucky. A television series continuation Chucky was released in October 2021 and Mancini said that following the TV show, feature films will continue to be developed in the future.

In an interview with Bloody Disgusting, Mancini discussed the potential of a Child's Play film set on a train, as well as revealing plans for a crossover film with the A Nightmare on Elm Street franchise, tentatively referred to as Child's Play on Elm Street.

I would like to do Freddy and Chucky, just because I think they would be a fun double act. I'm more really interested in the characters. My pitch for Freddy vs. Chucky is Child's Play on Elm Street. Chucky ends up in some kid's house on Elm Street, and Chucky and Freddy inevitably meet in the dreamscape. Chucky sleeps. Why not? Chucky sleeps, Chucky dreams. And they have this admiration for each other. But they realize quickly that Elm Street isn't big enough for the two of them, so in a riff on Dirty Rotten Scoundrels they have a contest: who can kill the most teenagers before the sun comes up?

Mancini confirmed his intent to make the crossover film, describing it as "cool and doable", saying that the film would be titled Child's Play on Elm Street and that he was in discussion with New Line Cinema about the film. The foundation for a crossover film was previously laid in Bride of Chucky, in which Freddy Krueger's bladed glove had appeared in the Lockport police evidence depository at the beginning of the film.

In March 2024, Don Mancini announced he was in early stages of development on a new Chucky movie that would work in tandem with the series. In September the same year, Mancini assured the franchise's continuation despite the cancellation of the television series. In February 2026, Jennifer Tilly confirmed she would reprise her role as Tiffany in any future installments. In April of the same year, Mancini announced during a convention that the script is currently being written and will feature a similar approach to Curse of Chucky. The film is intended to be released theatrically with Mancini directing. In June 2026, Brad Dourif confirmed during a panel that he will continue to voice Chucky in any future projects, specifically by telling the crowd, "Nobody's doing Chucky but me."

== Television ==
Series	Season	Episodes		Originally released	
Series	Season	Episodes		First released	Last released
Chucky	1	8		October 12, 2021	November 30, 2021
Chucky	2	8		October 5, 2022	November 23, 2022
Chucky	3	8	4	October 4, 2023	October 25, 2023
Chucky	3	8	4	April 10, 2024	May 1, 2024

=== Chucky (2021–2024) ===
A television series, titled Chucky, was released on October 12, 2021, with involvement from franchise creator Don Mancini and producer David Kirschner. The show aired on Syfy and USA Network and shares continuity with the original film series, and is a continuation of that story. Mancini stated that besides the TV series, feature films will still continue to be developed. Brad Dourif returned to voice Charles Lee "Chucky" Ray. Executive producers of the series include David Kirschner and Nick Antosca. Mancini directed and wrote the first episode.

In addition to Brad Dourif, Jennifer Tilly reprised her roles, as both herself and as Tiffany Valentine in the series. Fiona Dourif reprises her roles as Nica and Chucky. Billy Boyd as Glen and Glenda, Alex Vincent and Christine Elise McCarthy reprised their roles as Andy Barclay and Kyle. Other cast members include Zackary Arthur, Teo Briones, Alyvia Alyn Lind, Björgvin Arnarson, Devon Sawa, Lexa Doig and Barbara Alyn Woods.

In September 2024, the series was canceled after three seasons.

== Short films ==
Film	U.S. release date	Director(s)	Screenwriter(s)	Producer(s)
Chucky's Vacation Slides	2005	Don Mancini	Don Mancini	David Kirschner
Chucky Invades	2013	Don Mancini	Don Mancini	David Kirschner

=== Chucky's Vacation Slides (2005) ===
On the home media DVD and Blu-ray release of Seed of Chucky in 2005, a short film entitled Chucky's Vacation Slides was included in the special features. The short, set after the shooting of Seed of Chucky, follows the movie stars Chucky, Tiffany, and Glen after having returned from a family vacation. While browsing through their photographs of their vacation on a slide projector, Tiffany notices various corpses in the background of certain photographs, realizing that Chucky has been killing people again. Tiffany leaves, with a distraught and sickened Glen, while Chucky continues to view the photographs. After a delivery man arrives with a pizza, Chucky leads him to his garage and kills him off-screen. Brad Dourif, Jennifer Tilly and Billy Boyd all reprise their roles from the films.

=== Chucky Invades (2013) ===
Leading up to the DVD release of Curse of Chucky in 2013, a series of short film videos were released. The clips showed Chucky interrupting the events of several other horror films. Brad Dourif and Edan Gross reprised their roles as Chucky and the Good Guys Doll, respectively.

- The first clip, Chucky invades Psycho, has Chucky using a stepladder to kill Marion Crane in the shower; he is then discovered by Norman Bates. Janet Leigh and Anthony Perkins appear in archival footage.
- The second clip, Chucky invades The Purge, has Chucky invading the Sandin family's home. Ethan Hawke, Lena Headey, Adelaide Kane and Max Burkholder appear in archival footage. The film is designed in the form of a trailer for a film.
- The third clip, Chucky invades Mama, follows Chucky as he hides under the bed of Victoria Desange before attacking her. Jessica Chastain and Isabelle Nélisse appear in archival footage.
- The fourth clip, Chucky invades Drag Me to Hell, follows Chucky attacking Christine Brown in her car. Alison Lohman appears in archival footage.

== Cast and crew ==
=== Principal cast ===
List indicators
- A dark grey cell indicates the character was not in the film or that the character's presence in the film has not yet been announced.
- ^{A} indicates an appearance through archival footage taken from a previous film in the franchise.
- ^{C} indicates a cameo appearance.
- ^{H} indicates an appearance as the human form of an occasionally non-human character.
- ^{V} indicates a voice-only role.
- ^{Y} indicates a younger version of a character

Character	Film series							Reboot film	Television series		
Character	Child's Play	Child's Play 2	Child's Play 3	Bride of Chucky	Seed of Chucky	Curse of Chucky	Cult of Chucky	Child's Play	Season 1	Season 2	Season 3
Chucky	Brad Dourif^{VH}	Brad Dourif^{V}	Brad Dourif^{V}	Brad Dourif^{V}	Brad Dourif^{V}	Brad Dourif^{VH}	Brad Dourif^{V} Fiona Dourif^{H}	Mark Hamill^{V}	Brad Dourif^{V} David Kohlsmith^{Y} Tyler Barish^{Y} Fiona Dourif^{VHY}		
Chucky	Edan Gross^{V}	Edan Gross^{V}	Edan Gross^{V}	Rebecca Brenner ^{V}	Brad Dourif^{V}	Edan Gross^{V}	Edan Gross^{V}	Mark Hamill^{V}	Brad Dourif^{V} David Kohlsmith^{Y} Tyler Barish^{Y} Fiona Dourif^{VHY}		
Andy Barclay	Alex Vincent	Alex Vincent	Justin Whalin Alex Vincent^{Y}^{P}			Alex Vincent^{C}	Alex Vincent	Gabriel Bateman	Alex Vincent	Alex Vincent	Alex Vincent
Karen Barclay	Catherine Hicks	Catherine Hicks^{P}	Catherine Hicks^{P}			Catherine Hicks^{P}		Aubrey Plaza			
Detective Mike Norris	Chris Sarandon					Chris Sarandon^{A}^{P}		Brian Tyree Henry			
Eddie Caputo	Neil Giuntoli								Ivan DiCario^{Y}		
Kyle		Christine Elise				Christine Elise^{P}	Christine Elise^{C}		Christine Elise	Christine Elise	
Mr. Christopher Sullivan / Henry Kaslan		Peter Haskell	Peter Haskell					Tim Matheson			
Tiffany Valentine Jennifer Tilly				Jennifer Tilly^{VH}	Jennifer Tilly^{VH}	Jennifer Tilly^{VH}	Jennifer Tilly^{VH}		Jennifer Tilly Blaise Crocker^{Y}	Jennifer Tilly	Jennifer Tilly
Glen Tilly				Infant cameo	Beans El-Balawi^{H} Billy Boyd^{V}					Lachlan Watson Billy Boyd^{V}	
Glenda Tilly				Infant cameo	Kristina Hewitt^{H} Billy Boyd^{V}					Lachlan Watson Billy Boyd^{V}	
Nica Pierce						Fiona Dourif	Fiona Dourif		Fiona Dourif	Fiona Dourif	Fiona Dourif
Alice Pierce						Summer H. Howell	Summer H. Howell^{VH}				
Jake Wheeler									Zackary Arthur	Zackary Arthur	Zackary Arthur
Devon Evans									Björgvin Arnarson	Björgvin Arnarson	Björgvin Arnarson
Lexy Cross									Alyvia Alyn Lind	Alyvia Alyn Lind	Alyvia Alyn Lind

=== Crew ===
Role	Original series							Television series	Reboot
Role	Child's Play	Child's Play 2	Child's Play 3	Bride of Chucky	Seed of Chucky	Curse of Chucky	Cult of Chucky	Chucky	Child's Play
Role	1988	1990	1991	1998	2004	2013	2017	2021–2024	2019
Director	Tom Holland	John Lafia	Jack Bender	Ronny Yu	Don Mancini	Don Mancini	Don Mancini	Don Mancini	Lars Klevberg
Writer(s)	Don Mancini John Lafia Tom Holland	Don Mancini	Don Mancini	Don Mancini	Don Mancini	Don Mancini	Don Mancini	Don Mancini	Tyler Burton Smith
Producer(s)	David Kirschner	David Kirschner	Robert Latham Brown	David Kirschner	David Kirschner	David Kirschner	David Kirschner Ogden Gavanski	Executive producer Don Mancini David Kirschner	Seth Grahame-Smith David Katzenberg
Producer(s)	David Kirschner	David Kirschner	Robert Latham Brown	Grace Gilroy	Corey Sienega	David Kirschner	David Kirschner Ogden Gavanski	Nick Antosca	Seth Grahame-Smith David Katzenberg
Composer(s)	Joe Renzetti	Graeme Revell	Cory Lerios John D'Andrea	Graeme Revell	Pino Donaggio	Joseph LoDuca	Joseph LoDuca	Joseph LoDuca	Bear McCreary
Cinematography	Bill Butler	Stefan Czapsky	John R. Leonetti	Peter Pau	Vernon Layton	Michael Marshall	Michael Marshall	Colin Hoult	Brendan Uegama
Editor(s)	Edward Warschilka Roy E. Peterson	Edward Warschilka	Scott Wallace Edward A. Warschilka Jr.	David Wu Randy Bricker	Chris Dickens	James Coblentz	Randy Bricker	Mike Harrelson	Tom Elkins

=== Music ===
Joe Renzetti composed the first Child's Play, followed by Graeme Revell, who composed the soundtrack for Child's Play 2 and Bride of Chucky. John D'Andrea and Cory Lerios wrote the score for Child's Play 3, while Pino Donaggio composed Seed of Chucky. Joseph LoDuca composed the score for Curse of Chucky, Cult of Chucky, and Chucky.

== Reception ==
=== Box office performance ===
The Child's Play series, when compared to the other top-grossing American horror series—A Nightmare on Elm Street, Halloween, Friday the 13th, Saw, Scream, and The Texas Chainsaw Massacre—and adjusting for 2023 inflation, is last in box office performance at $305.2 million.

Halloween is the highest-grossing horror series in the United States at approximately $1.09 billion. Next in line is Friday the 13th at $908.4 million, followed by the Nightmare on Elm Street series with $793.5 million. The Scream film series is in fourth place with $779.5 million, followed by the Saw series with $688.3 million, and 'The Texas Chainsaw Massacre with $459.7 million.

Film	Release date	Box office revenue				Budget	Reference
Film	Release date	North America	Other territories	Worldwide	Worldwide adjusted	Budget	Reference
Child's Play	November 9, 1988	$33,244,684	$10,952,000	$44,196,684	$83,933,325	$9,000,000	
Child's Play 2	November 9, 1990	$28,501,605	$7,262,000	$35,763,605	$64,740,8729	$13,000,000	
Child's Play 3	August 30, 1991	$14,960,255	$5,600,000	$20,560,255	$35,716,113	$13,000,000	
Bride of Chucky	October 16, 1998	$32,404,188	$18,288,000	$50,692,188	$73,581,099	$25,000,000	
Seed of Chucky	November 12, 2004	$17,083,732	$7,745,912	$24,829,644	$31,099,354	$12,000,000	
Child's Play	June 21, 2019	$29,208,403	$15,693,834	$44,902,237	$44,902,237	$10,000,000	
Total		$126,194,464	$49,847,912	$205,250,779	$333,973,000	$64,000,000_{(E)}	
List indicator: (E) indicates an estimated figure based on available numbers.

=== Critical and public response ===
Critical and public response of Child's Play films
Film	Critical		Public
Film	Rotten Tomatoes	Metacritic	CinemaScore
Child's Play (1988)	74% (6.3/10 average rating) (54 reviews)	58 (18 reviews)	B
Child's Play 2	50% (5/10 average rating) (16 reviews)	37 (16 reviews)	A-
Child's Play 3	19% (4.2/10 average rating) (16 reviews)	27 (13 reviews)	—N/a
Bride of Chucky	47% (5.6/10 average rating) (45 reviews)	48 (17 reviews)	B
Seed of Chucky	37% (4.6/10 average rating) (78 reviews)	46 (17 reviews)	C+
Curse of Chucky	78% (6.3/10 average rating) (18 reviews)	58 (5 reviews)	—N/a
Cult of Chucky	81% (6.2/10 average rating) (26 reviews)	69 (5 reviews)	—N/a
Child's Play (2019)	64% (5.8/10 average rating) (206 reviews)	48 (35 reviews)	C+

Critical response of Child's Play series
Series	Season	Rotten Tomatoes	Metacritic
Chucky	1	92% (7/10 average rating) (36 reviews)	70 (12 reviews)
Chucky	2	93% (7/10 average rating) (14 reviews)	—N/a
Chucky	3	100% (8.1/10 average rating) (15 reviews)	—N/a

=== Controversies ===
The following crimes have been associated with the Child's Play films:

In December 1992, four people who tortured and killed 16-year-old Suzanne Capper were said to be influenced by one of the Child's Play films. During the torturing of the girl, the perpetrators taunted her by playing her a song, ("Hi, I'm Chucky (Wanna Play?)") by 150 Volts, featuring samples from the film Child's Play.

In 1993, two youths who abducted and murdered a toddler named James Bulger were said to have been influenced by the film Child's Play 3. The supposed link between the murder and the film was denied by film censor James Ferman.

According to a relative of two boys aged 10 and 12 who brutally attacked a nine-year-old and 11-year-old boy in Edlington, South Yorkshire in April 2009, the attackers watched horror movies, including Chucky films, from the age of about six or seven.

Elena Lobacheva, a Russian serial killer arrested in 2015, was reportedly obsessed with the film Bride of Chucky, which she cited as being an inspiration for the murders that she and her gang committed throughout Moscow.

In August 2019, billboards and posters promoting the 2019 Child's Play reboot were pulled in New Zealand after a complaint was submitted to the Advertising Standards Authority (ASA) for being inappropriate. The complaint was made mostly with concern for the region of Canterbury, claiming the advertisements are potentially traumatizing among children by reminding them of that region's high suicide rates, the various earthquakes that occurred, and the Christchurch mosque shootings. The ad depicted Chucky with red glowing eyes and a knife, the latter being intentionally obscured by the title. The poster was deemed not to cause any harm among the population, but the ASA concluded it would be frightening for children.

== Other media ==
=== Novels ===
==== Child's Play 2 ====
A tie-in novelization to Child's Play 2 was later written by Matthew J. Costello. The author added in some of his own plot scenes exclusive to the novel, such as going deeper into Andy Barclay and Chucky's past. Chucky is characterized to have an absent father and his abusive mother being a dwarf. Chucky got teased a lot because of this and later strangled his mother to death. Also, Chucky was put in special classes when he was younger. During the scene at the factory, Chucky sees a bunch of Good Guy dolls and wishes that he could bring them to life to do his bidding. This was partially used as the plot of the film Cult of Chucky.

==== Child's Play 3 ====
A tie-in novel to Child's Play 3 was later written by Matthew J. Costello. Just like Child's Play 2, this novel had some of the author's own inclusions. In the beginning (adapted from an earlier draft of the screenplay), in the Play Pals factory, a rat scours for food and, smelling blood within the plastic, chews on Chucky's remains. Blood then leaks out of the remains and somehow leaks onto another doll.

Chucky's death in this book is also different. In the novel, while defending Tyler on an exterior ride, Andy grapples with Chucky before finally shooting him several times, causing the doll's body to fall to the ground, and Andy watches the head shatter to blood, metal and plastic.

=== Comics ===
==== Innovation Publishing ====
Beginning in 1992, Innovation Publishing released the first comic books based on the films, in the form of a three-issue adaptation of Child's Play 2. It was later collected in a trade paperback. The success of the adaptation led to a monthly series of new stories starting in 1991. The series, titled Child's Play: The Series, ended in 1992 after only five issues. This was followed by a three-issue adaptation of Child's Play 3.

==== Devil's Due Publishing ====
In 2007, Devil's Due Publishing obtained the license to publish Child's Play comics and released a one-shot crossover with Hack/Slash titled Hack/Slash vs. Chucky which takes place after the events of Seed of Chucky. This was followed by a four-issue series called Chucky. A second volume began in early 2009 but ceased publication after only one issue.

=== Video games ===
In May 2011, a video game titled Chucky: Wanna Play? was announced to be in development. It was set to be a hack-and-slash video game and was being developed by TikGames. It was planned to be released on Xbox 360, PlayStation 3 and Windows. A Kickstarter campaign was posted by the company in an effort to secure $925,000 for the development of the PC version of the game, with the intention of releasing the console versions shortly thereafter. However on November 12, 2012, it was announced that the project was cancelled after the Kickstarter failed to meet its goal.

Chucky themed decal was included in Rocket League during 2022's edition of their Haunted Hallows event. A downloadable Chucky chapter for the asymmetrical horror video game Dead By Daylight, featuring Chucky and Tiffany as killers was released on November 28, 2023. However, all Chucky content will be removed from the game on November 24, 2026. Cosmetics from the chapter will remain usable by players who purchased them before this date. Zen Studios released Chucky's Killer Pinball, a pinball table for Pinball M on November 30, 2023. Roblox released a limited time mode featuring Chucky titled Griefville: Survive the Nightmare on March 20, 2024. Chucky is a playable character in Funko Fusion. Chucky and Tiffany have also appeared as playable characters in the Call of Duty franchise with Call of Duty: Black Ops 6 and Call of Duty: Warzone in an event called "The Haunting" starting on October 9, 2025.

==== Mobile game ====
Slimstown Studios made an endless runner video game titled Chucky: Slash & Dash. The game was released on November 1, 2013 on the iPhone, iPad, iPod Touch and Android devices. It is the result of an agreement with Universal Partnerships & Licensing to develop and publish the first officially licensed smartphone and tablet Child's Play video game. The gameplay is inspired by the second film's climax.

In the game, Chucky and Tiffany are stuck in a never-ending nightmare in which they endlessly run through the factory that produces Good Guys dolls. Players control Chucky or Tiffany while sprinting through the factory floor, the catwalks, the warehouse, or even outside, and need to avoid conveyor belts, forklifts, acid pools, barrels and other obstacles. Chucky and Tiffany can also eliminate security guards patrolling the factory using a knife or other more outlandish weapons like a cleaver, screwdriver, or hatchet. As they play, gamers collect batteries that can be used to purchase in-game items or power-ups, such as a double battery bonus, a fast start, or extra lives that can extend a run after dying.

=== Universal theme park attractions ===
Since 1992, Chucky has starred in his own shows at Universal's Halloween Horror Nights, entitled, Chucky's In-Your-Face Insults, Chucky's Insult Emporium, and Late Night with Chucky.

In 2009, the climax of Child's Play 3 received its own maze, entitled Chucky's Fun House. Curse of Chucky has also received its own Scarezone in the 2013 lineup. In 2017, Chucky was the host of the Hollywood event's Terror Tram, joining Freddy, Jason, and Leatherface in terrorizing guests as a promotion for the then-new Cult of Chucky film. The following year, he featured in his own Scarezone at the Orlando event. In 2023, Chucky received a Haunted House based on the television series.

== See also ==
- Killer toy
- Haunted doll
