= Chantal Quesnel =

Canadian actress (born 1971)

Chantal Quesnel (sometimes credited as Chantal Quesnelle; 25 October 1971–25 September 2023) was a Canadian actress. She was a voice actress for the TV animated series Zeroman, shown in Canada on Teletoon. She also appeared in Don Mancini's film Curse of Chucky.

== Career ==
Her most extensive TV role was as Yvonne Bernini on Paradise Falls, a soap opera on Showcase Television, starting in 2001. She has also had several roles, mainly on TV movies and in George A. Romero's Bruiser. She has had guest roles on various TV series, such as Odyssey 5, Sue Thomas: F.B.Eye, Goosebumps, La Femme Nikita and Forever Knight. Quesnel played the role of "The Cougar" on Spike TV's Blue Mountain State. She also appeared in the video game Far Cry 2.

== Filmography ==
=== Film ===
Year	Title	Role	Notes
1997	The Wrong Guy	Office Worker #1	
2000	Bruiser	Rita	
2012	Cyberstalker	Michelle Ashley	
2013	Real Gangsters	Margarita	
2013	Curse of Chucky	Sarah	
2015	The Colossal Failure of the Modern Relationship	Chantal / masseuse	

=== Television ===
Year	Title	Role	Notes
1994	RoboCop	Female Shorty	Episode: "Faces of Eve"
1995	Forever Knight	Debbie	Episode: "Outside the Lines"
1996	Kung Fu: The Legend Continues	Cindy Belmont	Episode: "Who Is Kwai Chang Caine?"
1998	La Femme Nikita	Sonia	Episode: "Mandatory Refusal"
1998	Goosebumps	Miss Karlsville	Episode: "Chillogy: Part 3: Escape from Karlsville"
1999	Deep in the City	Cindy Belmont	Episode: "Where the Bodies are Buried"
2000	Sex & Mrs. X	Patrice	Television film
2000	Virtual Mom	Saleslady	Television film
2001–2008	Paradise Falls	Yvonne Bernini	75 episodes
2002	I Love Mummy	Cincinnati Smith	Episode: "Cincinnati Smith"
2003	Odyssey 5	Kayli Haynes	3 episodes
2003	Threshold	Nanci Hanover	Television film
2004	Sue Thomas: F.B.Eye	Angela Portman	Episode: "The Lawyer"
2004	Zeroman	Various roles	2 episodes
2010	Who Is Clark Rockefeller?	Woman in Station	Television film
2010	Blue Mountain State	Pauline the Cougar	5 episodes
2010	The Dating Guy	Donna	Episode: "Too Fast Too Dexler"
2011	Nikita	TV Host	Episode: "Coup de Grace"
2011	The Kennedys	Toni Bradlee	Episode: "Cuban Missiles"
2011	Single White Spenny	Raven Hair	Episode: "Revenge Sex"
2011	Suits	Charisse	Episode: "The Shelf Life"
2012	Life with Boys	Gabe's Phone / Siri	2 episodes
2013	Hard Rock Medical	Claudia	Episode: "Diamonds and Dust"
2013	Satisfaction	The Coug	Episode: "Fade to Blackened"
2014	Karma's A B*tch	Michelle Bilotta	Episode: "Ponzi Payback"
2016	I'll Be Home for Christmas	Candice Edwards	Television film

=== Video games ===
Year	Title	Role
2008	Far Cry 2	Voice
