= Perrey Reeves =

American film and television actress

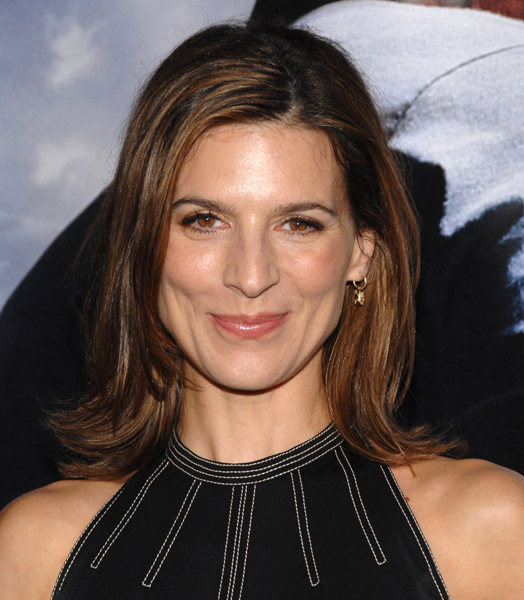
- Reeves in 2010
- Born: 1970 or 1971 (age 54–55); New York City, U.S.
- Occupation: Actress
- Years active: 1989–present
- Known for: Entourage; Mr. & Mrs. Smith; Old School
- Spouse: Aaron Fox (m. 2015)
- Children: 1
- Relatives: Hazard E. Reeves (grandfather)

Perrey Reeves (born 1970 or 1971) is an American film and television actress. She is best known for her recurring role as Melissa Gold on the television series Entourage from 2004 to 2011 and Marissa Jones in the 2003 comedy Old School.

== Early life ==
Reeves was born in New York City and raised in New Hampshire, the daughter of Dr. Alexander Reeves, a professor of medicine and anatomy at Dartmouth College. Reeves' paternal grandfather was sound pioneer Hazard E. Reeves, who introduced magnetic stereophonic sound to film.

== Career ==
Reeves co-starred on the comedy series Entourage (2004–2011) as Melissa Gold, the wife of Ari Gold. She also appeared (2009) in Rules of Engagement, Family Style, and in Grey's Anatomy. Other notable roles included Marissa opposite Will Ferrell in the film Old School and Jessie in the film Mr. and Mrs. Smith. She has had parts in American Dreamz, The X-Files, Kicking and Screaming, Escape to Witch Mountain, and Child's Play 3.

In 2014, Reeves appeared during the fifth and final season of Covert Affairs as the evil Caitlyn Cook. She reprised her role as Melissa Gold in the movie Entourage in 2015. She also played Nina Devon on the TV series Famous in Love.

== Other ventures ==
In 2012, Reeves moved to Costa Rica and started a yoga retreat in Cabuya named "The Sanctuary at Two Rivers". She began practicing yoga in 1993 and practices the ancient Indian healthcare tradition, Ayurveda.

== Personal life ==
From 1993 to 1995, Reeves was in a relationship with her X-Files co-star actor David Duchovny. In September 2014, Reeves became engaged to her boyfriend, tennis coach Aaron Fox. They wed on June 13, 2015. In October 2017, their first child, a baby girl, was born.

== Filmography ==
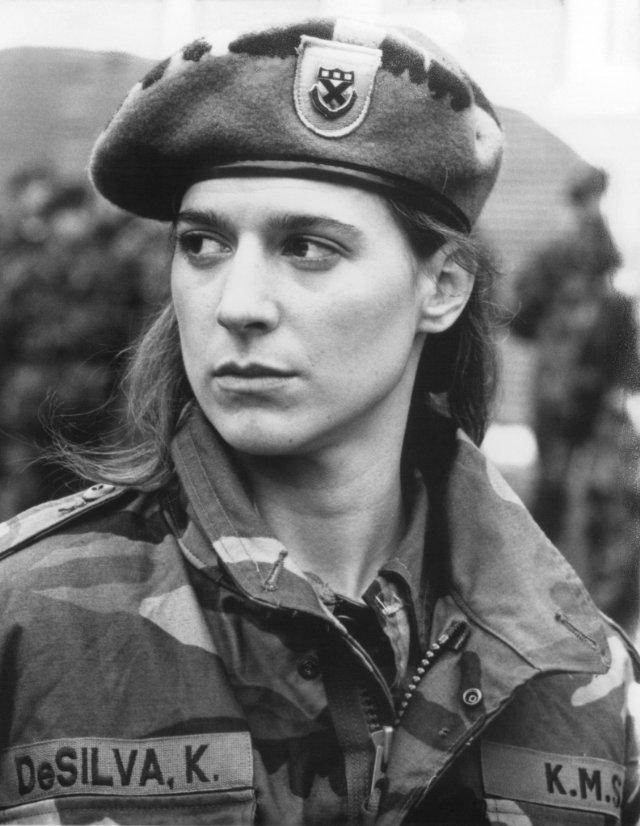
Reeves as Kristen De Silva in Child's Play 3.

=== Film ===
Year	Title	Role	Notes
1991	Child's Play 3	Kristen De Silva	
1995	Kicking and Screaming	Amy	
1998	Smoke Signals	Holly	
1999	The Suburbans	Amanda	
2003	Old School	Marissa Jones	
2005	Mr. & Mrs. Smith	Jessie	
2005	Undiscovered	Michelle	
2006	American Dreamz	Marni	
2009	An American Affair	Adrienne Stafford	
2009	Vicious Circle	Sgt. Berger	
2013	Innocence	Ava Dunham	
2013	Blake	Mae	
2014	Dissonance	Marty	
2014	Fugly!	Penny	
2015	Entourage	Melissa Gold	
2016	Noble Savages	Holly Savage	
2017	High Voltage	Barb	
2018	The Jurassic Games	Savannah	
2018	The World Without You	Clarissa	
2019	Plus One	Gina	
2021	Cosmic Sin	Dr. Lea Goss	
2024	Murder at Hollow Creek	Jennifer Bennett	Post-production
TBA	The Italians	Min	Pre-production

=== Television ===
Year	Title	Role	Notes
1989	Mothers, Daughters and Lovers	Laura	TV movie
1989	The Preppie Murder	Lauren	TV movie
1990	Open House	Vicki	episode: "Dumbstruck"
1990	21 Jump Street	Tracy Hill	episode: "Poison"
1990	The Flash	Pepper	episode: "Child's Play"
1991	Plymouth	Hannah Mathewson	TV movie
1991-1992	Doogie Howser, M.D.	Cecilia	episodes: "Truth and Consequences" and "If This Is Adulthood, I'd Rather Be in Philadelphia"
1992	Homefront	Perrette Davis	3 episodes
1993	The Return of Ironside	Suzanne Dwyer	TV movie
1994	Red Shoe Diaries	Joey	episode: "The Last Motel"
1994	The X-Files	Kristen Kilar	episode: "3"
1994	Murder, She Wrote	Susan Constable	episode: "The Murder Channel"
1995	Escape to Witch Mountain	Zoe Moon	TV movie
1995	Too Something		episode: "The Car"
1995	An Element of Truth	Maizie	TV movie
1996	Sliders	Taryn Miller	episode: "Dead Man Sliding"
2001	Off Centre	Brooke	episode: "A Cute Triangle"
2003	CSI: Crime Scene Investigation	Linda's Neighbor	episode: "Recipe for Murder"
2003	The Lyon's Den	Daphne	9 episodes
2003	CSI: Miami	Julia	episode: "Hurricane Anthony"
2004–2011	Entourage	Melissa Gold	74 episodes
2005	Medium	Karen Herzfeld	episode: "Too Close to Call"
2009	Grey's Anatomy	Margaret	episode: "Wish You Were Here"
2009	Rules of Engagement	Ellen	episode: "Family Style"
2009	Ghost Whisperer	Rita Jansen	episode: "Dead Listing"
2009	Castle	Helen Parker	episode: "One Man's Treasure"
2010	Private Practice	Kelly	episode: "Second Choices"
2011	Hawaii Five-0	Anne Davis	episode: "Ne Me'e Laua Na Paio"
2012	NCIS	Wendy Miller	episode: "Secrets"
2012	White Collar	Landon Shepard	episode: "Compromising Positions"
2013	Secret Lives of Husbands and Wives	Danielle Deaver	TV movie
2013	Royal Pains	Minnie	episode: "Can of Worms"
2013	Perception	Miranda Stiles	3 episodes
2014	Covert Affairs	Caitlyn Cook	6 episodes
2015	Babysitter's Black Book	Linda	TV movie
2016	Beat Bobby Flay	Herself	episode: "Green with Envy"
2017–2018	Famous in Love	Nina Devon	20 episodes
2021–	Paradise City	Natalie	TV spinoff of American Satan
