= Christine Elise =

American actress

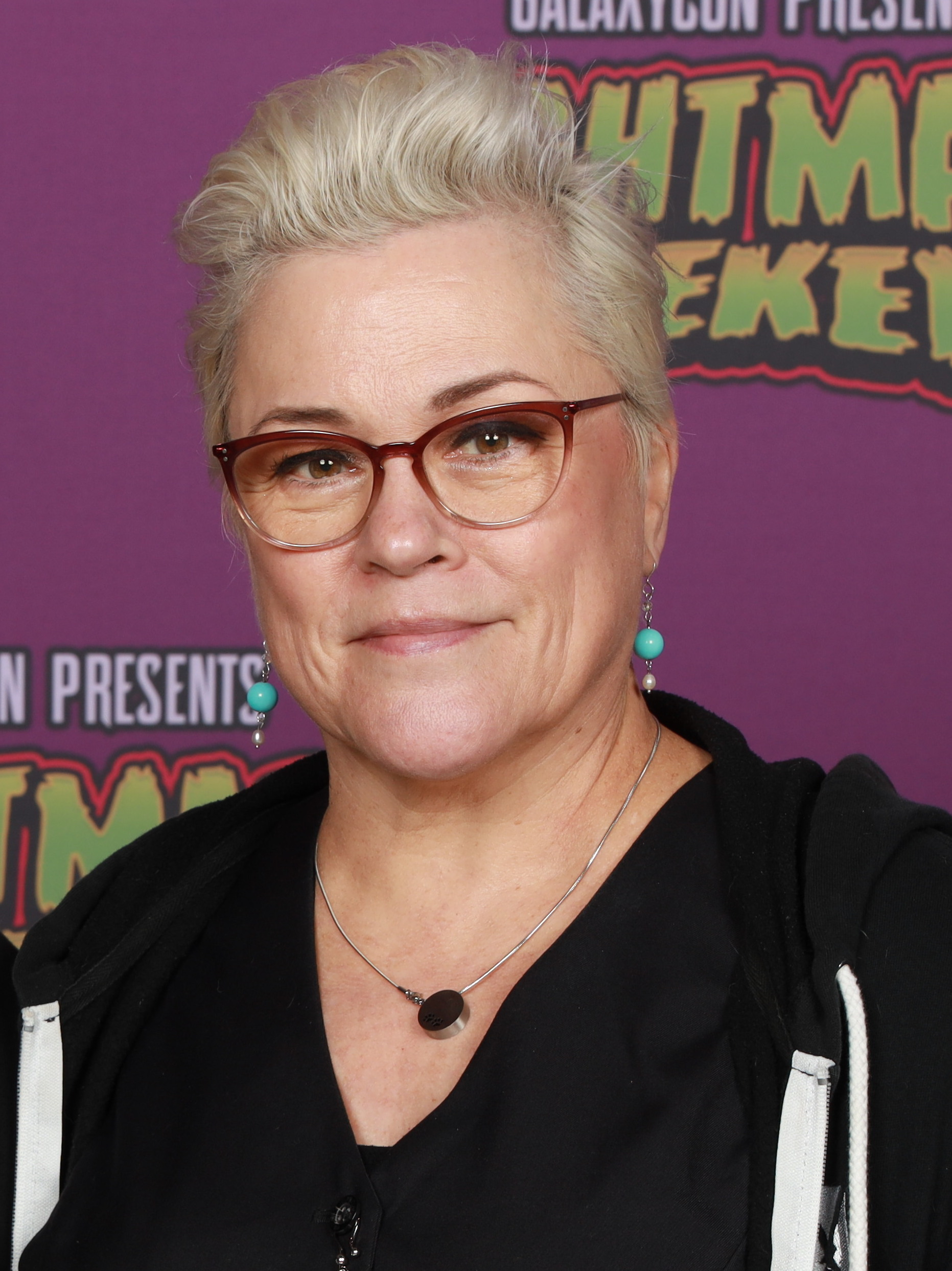
- Elise in 2025
- Occupation: Actress
- Years active: 1988–present
- Partner: Jason Priestley (1992–1997)

Christine Elise McCarthy, professionally known as Christine Elise, is an American film and television actress. She is best known for her roles as Emily Valentine in Beverly Hills, 90210 and BH90210, and Kyle in the Child's Play franchise, first appearing in Child's Play 2 (1990) and reprising the role in Cult of Chucky (2017) and the Syfy/USA Network series Chucky (2021–2024).

== Career ==
=== Film career ===
Early in her career, Elise had a recurring role in the final season of China Beach which she often cites as her best professional experience. She played the role of Kyle in the 1990 film Child's Play 2. In 1993, she played Jenn Platt in the horror film Body Snatchers. She had a recurring role as Emily Valentine on Beverly Hills, 90210 and also appeared on the second season of ER for 17 episodes as Harper Tracy.

Following her stint on ER, Elise appeared on the short-lived Fox show L.A. Firefighters. She appeared in the TV movie Vanishing Point with Viggo Mortensen, who had requested that she play the role. They had met on another project, Boiling Point, though her role was largely written out. She had a recurring role as the daughter of Police Chief Bill Gillespie on In the Heat of the Night and also appeared in the Charmed episode Desperate Housewitches. She was featured in the punk rock documentaries American Hardcore and All Ages: The Boston Hardcore Film.

McCarthy made her directorial debut with an award-winning short film she also wrote, produced, and starred in: Bathing and the Single Girl. Since December 2010, Bathing and the Single Girl has been screened at more than 100 festivals and has won 20 awards. Dystel & Goderich Literary Management represents her full-length novel of the same name, Bathing and the Single Girl, released in January 2014.

McCarthy has also been a programmer of Michigan's Waterfront Film Festival since it was founded in 1999. She has also been involved in multiple capacities (juror, panelist, programmer, and moderator) with Sidewalk FF, Indie Memphis FF, Oxford FF, RxSM FF, Victoria Texas Independent FF, Kansas City Jubilee FF, Lady Filmmakers FF, and Portland Oregon Women's FF.

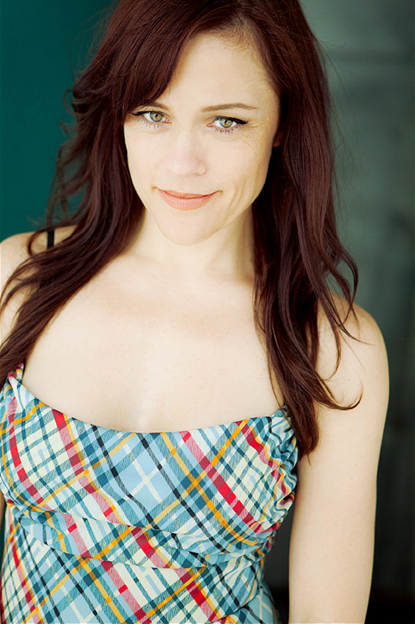
Christine Elise in 2009

McCarthy has also worked as a story producer since 2014, producing such reality shows as Hellevator (with the Soska Twins), Best Bars in America, Cold Justice, Tamar & Vince, and Rich in Faith.

On February 11, 2015, McCarthy appeared on Ken Reid's TV Guidance Counselor Podcast.

Elise revisited her role as Emily Valentine from Beverly Hills, 90210 in the reboot, BH90210 in 2019 playing a "heightened version" of herself on the series. She has said in interviews that she was approached to be involved in a spin off for her Emily Valentine character, as the original idea for the show Melrose Place, but they could not reach a deal.

Elise reprised her role of Kyle from Child's Play 2 and Cult of Chucky in the 2021 SYFY & USA Network series - Chucky - helmed by Child's Play franchise creator Don Mancini. The series premiered October 12, 2021.

=== Career outside film industry ===
Under her birth name (Christine Elise McCarthy), she has worked as a professional photographer, once (February 2008) showing her work at the 2nd Cup Cafe in Boston. In 2008, her photographs were displayed at the Paris restaurant Pink Flamingo. In April 2009, she participated in the Cambridge, Massachusetts, exhibit called "Burlesque As Art".

== Personal life ==
Elise graduated from Boston Latin School in 1983. From 1992 to 1997, she was in a relationship with her 90210 co-star Jason Priestley. She is a vegan.

== Filmography ==
=== Film ===
Year	Title	Role	Note
1990	Child's Play 2	Kyle	
1991	Defenseless	Cindy Bodeck	
1993	Boiling Point	Carol	
1993	Body Snatchers	Jenn Platt	
1998	The Thin Pink Line	Darby	
2006	Mojave Phone Booth	Alex	
2007	Route 30	June	
2011	Prom	Sandra Linsey	
2017	Cult of Chucky	Kyle	Cameo in post-credits scene

=== Television ===
Year	Title	Role	Note
1989	Baywatch	Amy Laederach / Catherine Baker	1 episode
1989	Head of the Class	Rhonda Gielgud	3 episodes
1989	21 Jump Street	Quincy Thompson	1 episode
1990	China Beach	Karen Lanier	4 episodes
1991	Northern Exposure	Cindy Rincon	1 episode
1991	Matlock	Jill Lambert	1 episode
1991	In the Heat of the Night	Lana Farren	5 episodes
1991	Beverly Hills, 90210	Emily Valentine	12 episodes
1995	ER	Harper Tracy	15 episodes
1995	Burke's Law	Leona Barnett	1 episode
1996	L.A. Firefighters	Erin Coffey	13 episodes
1997	Mother Knows Best	Laurel Cooper	Lifetime TV film
1998	Fantasy Island	Mary Wilcox	1 episode
1999	The Strip	Detective Lindsay Karbo	2 episodes
2000	Nowhere to Land	Kim McGee	TV movie
2001	Strong Medicine	Captain Gloria McKinney	1 episode
2001	Family Law	Linda Crowley	1 episode
2001	Judging Amy	Susan Natali	1 episode
2002	JAG	Commander Ferraro	1 episode
2005	Law & Order: Special Victims Unit	Carol Rogers	1 episode (credited as Christine Elise McCarthy)
2005	Charmed	Miss Diane	1 episode (credited as Christine Elise McCarthy)
2006	Cold Case	Sally	1 episode
2009	Saving Grace	Lily Carter	1 episode (credited as Christine Elise McCarthy)
2012	Castle	Suzanne Rizzo	1 episode (credited as Christine Elise McCarthy)
2016	Hit the Floor	Ob / Gyn	1 episode
2017	Get Shorty	Lydia	1 episode
2019	BH90210	Emily Valentine / Herself	Recurring 5/6
2021–2022	Chucky	Kyle	Recurring (seasons 1-2)
