= Joseph LoDuca =

American composer (born 1958)

- Born: 1958 (age 67–68)
- Occupation: Composer
- Notable work: Ash vs Evil Dead and Evil Dead Soundtracks
- Awards: 2009 Emmy Awards
- Website: https://www.josephloduca.com/

Joseph LoDuca (born 1958) is an American television and film score composer best known for his work writing television scores for the series Spartacus, Leverage, Hercules: The Legendary Journeys, Xena: Warrior Princess, Young Hercules, The Librarians TV series, American Gothic and Jack of All Trades. Originally an accomplished jazz guitarist in the Detroit (MI, USA) area, LoDuca frequently provides music for producer/director Robert Tapert, producer/director Sam Raimi, producer/director Dean Devlin and actor Bruce Campbell's films and series. Prior to his work on The Evil Dead, his first film, he released a jazz LP titled Glisten.

LoDuca's credits include 2 Primetime Emmy Awards, 11 Primetime Emmy Nominations, and "Most Performed Underscore" recognitions from ASCAP for four consecutive years. He garnered a César Award nomination; Meilleure Musique Écrite Pour Un Film (Best Music) and a Saturn Award nomination for the French international film Brotherhood of the Wolf, as well as being lauded as "Horror Film Composer of the Year" for his score to Army of Darkness.

LoDuca was nominated for and won the Emmy Award in 2009 for Outstanding Music Composition for a Series for his music in Legend of the Seeker.

LoDuca played in a rock band in his teens, before studying literature and composition at the University of Michigan and Wayne State University. He claimed to prefer composition, because it let him "run among the disciplines without getting caught".

== Selected works ==
- The Evil Dead (1981) (Film) (as Joe LoDuca)
- Evil Dead II (1987) (Film)
- Army of Darkness (1992) (Film)
- M.A.N.T.I.S (1994–1995) (TV series)
- Hercules: The Legendary Journeys (1994–1999) (TV series)
- Xena: Warrior Princess (1995–2001) (TV series)
- American Gothic (1995–1996) (TV series)
- Hercules and Xena - The Animated Movie: The Battle for Mount Olympus (1998) (Video)
- Young Hercules (1998–1999) (TV series)
- Jack of All Trades (2000) (TV series)
- Cleopatra 2525 (2000–2001) (TV series)
- Brotherhood of the Wolf (Le Pacte Des Loups) (2001) (Film)
- He-Man and the Masters of the Universe (2002–2004)
- Saint Ange (House of Voices) (2004) (Film)
- The Triangle (2005) (TV Miniseries)
- Boogeyman (2005) (Film)
- Man with the Screaming Brain (2005) (Film)
- My Name Is Bruce (2007) (Film)
- The Messengers (2007) (Film)
- Boogeyman 2 (2007) (Film)
- The Staircase Murders (2007) (TV Movie)
- Legend of the Seeker (2008–2010) (TV series)
- Leverage (2008–2012) (TV series)
- Patagonia (2010) (Film)
- Spartacus (2010–2013) (TV series)
- Curse of Chucky (2013) (Video)
- The Librarians (2014–2018) (TV series)
- Pay the Ghost (2015) (Film)
- Ash vs Evil Dead (2015–2018) (TV series)
- Disjointed (2017–18) (TV series)
- Cult of Chucky (2017) (Video)
- Bad Samaritan (2018) (Film)
- Mr. Iglesias (2019–2020) (TV series)
- Chucky (2021–2024) (TV series)
- Evil Dead: The Game (2022) (Video game)
- Spartacus: House of Ashur (2025–2026) (TV series)
- Ernie & Emma (2026) (Film)
- Stuart Fails to Save the Universe (2026) (TV series)
