= Cult of Chucky =

2017 film by Don Mancini

- Promotional poster
- Directed by: Don Mancini
- Written by: Don Mancini
- Based on: Characters by Don Mancini
- Produced by: David Kirschner; Ogden Gavanski
- Starring: Fiona Dourif; Michael Therriault; Adam Hurtig; Alex Vincent; Jennifer Tilly; Brad Dourif
- Cinematography: Michael Marshall
- Edited by: Randy Bricker
- Music by: Joseph LoDuca
- Production company: Universal 1440 Entertainment
- Distributed by: Universal Pictures Home Entertainment
- Release dates: August 24, 2017 (FF2017); October 3, 2017
- Running time: 91 minutes
- Country: United States
- Language: English
- Budget: $5 million

Cult of Chucky is a 2017 American supernatural slasher film written and directed by series creator Don Mancini. Serving as a sequel to Curse of Chucky (2013) and the seventh installment of the Child's Play franchise, it stars Fiona Dourif, Michael Therriault, Adam Hurtig, Alex Vincent, Jennifer Tilly and Brad Dourif as the voice of Chucky. The film follows Chucky returning to terrorize his latest victim, Nica, who is confined to an asylum for the criminally insane.

Cult of Chucky began production in Winnipeg, Manitoba, Canada in January 2017 and premiered at the London FrightFest Film Festival on August 24 the same year. As with the previous film, it was released direct-to-video by Universal Pictures Home Entertainment via Blu-ray, DVD and VOD on October 3. The film received generally positive reviews from critics and, as of October 2017, grossed over $2.3 million from DVD and Blu-ray sales. A sequel television series, Chucky, premiered in 2021.

== Plot ==
Almost twenty years after their last encounter, (Note: As depicted in Child's Play 3 (1991)) Andy Barclay has been torturing the disembodied head of Chucky for four years (Note: As depicted in Curse of Chucky (2013).). Meanwhile, paraplegic survivor Nica Pierce has been in a mental institution after being framed by Chucky for the murder of her family. Nica now believes she was responsible and that Chucky was just a figment of her imagination.

Dr. Foley, Nica's sexually abusive psychiatrist, has her sent to a medium-security facility. Nica meets fellow patients Angela, Claire, Madeleine and Malcolm, a man with dissociative identity disorder. During a group therapy session, Foley introduces a therapy technique involving a Good Guy doll. Madeleine, who was institutionalized for smothering her infant son, immediately begins to treat the doll as if it was her baby.

Nica is visited by Tiffany Valentine, the legal guardian of her niece Alice, and is devastated to learn that Alice has died. Tiffany leaves behind a second Good Guy doll, which is possessed by Chucky's spirit. That night, Chucky awakens and discovers that Nica has slit her wrists. The next morning, Nica finds that her wrists have been stitched up and Angela has been killed, and she realizes that her "delusions" of Chucky were real all along. Chucky next kills Claire, while Malcolm begins to refer to himself as "Charles", making Nica suspect that Chucky has transferred his soul into him.

Andy learns about the murders and realizes Chucky has somehow transferred his soul into multiple vessels simultaneously. Dr. Foley hypnotizes Nica and attempts to assault her, but is knocked out by Chucky, who attempts to coax Nica into killing him. Later, Madeleine smothers her Good Guy doll with a pillow, forcing her to confront her real child's death; orderlies bury the doll to placate her. Andy commits himself into the institution by assaulting a security guard. Carlos, a nurse, delivers a third Good Guy doll to Foley. Madeleine is visited by her own doll and allows it to murder her.

Foley attempts to assault Nica once again, but is knocked out by a Chucky doll. Nica realizes that both Foley and Tiffany's dolls are alive. They explain that the original Chucky found a voodoo spell that allowed him to separate his soul into multiple hosts. Alice was one such host but was killed. After animating the third Chucky, the three dolls kill Carlos when he wanders into the room. One of the Chucky dolls splits his soul into Nica, possessing her and giving her body the ability to walk again. She brutally stomps on Foley's head, killing him. Malcolm is killed by one of the dolls after admitting that he's not really "Charles," who is simply another of his split personalities.

The third Chucky unlocks Andy's cell and attacks him. Andy rips open the doll's chest and pulls out a hidden gun, revealing that he sent him to the institution to smuggle a weapon inside. He kills the doll but is unable to escape before Nica-Chucky locks him inside his cell and leaves him behind. Nica-Chucky escapes and reunites with Tiffany. The two drive off together with a Tiffany doll, also alive and sharing a portion of Tiffany's soul.

In a post-credits scene, Andy's former foster sister, Kyle, enters Andy's house, having been sent to continue torturing the severed Chucky head inside.

== Cast ==
- Fiona Dourif as Nica Pierce
- Alex Vincent as Andy Barclay
- Brad Dourif as the voice of Chucky
- Michael Therriault as Dr. Foley
- Adam Hurtig as "Multiple" Malcolm / Michael
- Elisabeth Rosen as Madeleine
- Grace Lynn Kung as Claire
- Marina Stephenson Kerr as Angela
- Zak Santiago as Nurse Carlos
- Ali Tataryn as Nurse Ashley
- Jennifer Tilly as Tiffany
- Summer H. Howell as Alice Pierce
- Christine Elise as Kyle

== Production ==
=== Development ===
In December 2013, following the release of Curse of Chucky, Don Mancini confirmed that he was planning on developing a seventh installment in the Child's Play franchise. By February 2015, Mancini was in the process of writing the script for the film. A year later, Mancini, Jennifer Tilly and Fiona Dourif confirmed that shooting would soon begin for the film. The production office for the film was opened in Winnipeg, Manitoba, Canada in December 2016. Subsequently on January 5, the premise, cast, production schedule and distribution details for Cult of Chucky were revealed, with shooting set to commence four days later. Tony Gardner returned as one of Chucky's puppeteers.

In an October 2013 interview, Mancini revealed that since Child's Play 3, he had always wanted to introduce the concept of "Multiple Chuckys" but was unable to do so due to budget constraints. He eventually used the concept in Cult of Chucky, 26 years later. A reference to Glen/Glenda (a character from Seed of Chucky) was cut out of the film, although it was something that Mancini "definitely wanted to keep".

=== Casting ===
Several actors from the previous films, Brad Dourif as Chucky, Fiona Dourif as Nica Pierce, Alex Vincent as Andy Barclay, Jennifer Tilly as Tiffany and Summer H. Howell as Alice returned in the seventh film. Brad Dourif was in all of them, Vincent in Child's Play (1988) and Child's Play 2, Tilly in Bride of Chucky (1998), Seed of Chucky (2004), and Curse of Chucky, and Fiona Dourif and Howell in Curse of Chucky (2013). Cult of Chucky marks Vincent's first principal role in the franchise since he was a child actor, in Child's Play 2, twenty-seven years prior. Although Andy appeared in Child's Play 3, he was played by a different actor, Justin Whalin, due to the events taking place eight years after the second film, which came out less than a year earlier. Alex Vincent also appeared as Andy during a post-credits scene in Curse of Chucky.

=== Filming ===
Principal photography for Cult of Chucky began in Winnipeg on January 9, 2017, with the cinematographer from Curse of Chucky, Michael Marshall, returning in the same capacity. Tony Gardner returned to create and perform the Chucky character as he had done previously for Seed of Chucky and Curse of Chucky. Filming ended on February 20 the same year.

== Release ==
Cult of Chucky was released on Blu-ray, DVD, and Netflix (in the USA) on October 3, 2017. It domestically grossed over $2.2 million during the first two weeks.

Unlike the Blu-ray and DVD versions of the film, the Netflix version was not unrated. The rated version is about a minute shorter than the unrated cut, and does not have a post-credits scene.

Shortly before its release, the full film of Cult of Chucky was leaked on to YouTube, which led Don Mancini to tweet: "To the geniuses who leaked #cultofchucky & tweeted about it Congrats, not only are u terrible people, now Universal lawyers know who u r".

== Reception ==
=== Critical response ===
On review aggregator Rotten Tomatoes, the film has a critics rating of 81% based on 26 reviews, and an audience rating of 62%. The site’s critics consensus states: “Old Dolls can learn new tricks: This little murderer with a facelift is sillier and better than ever thanks to Don Mancini's Cult of Chucky.” On Metacritic, the film has an average score of 69 out of 100, indicating "generally favorable" reviews.

An early review posted on Bloody Disgusting was very favorable of the film. Benedict Seal stated: "Seventh films have no right to be this good or break this much new ground. Cult of Chucky takes this wild story in a whole host of new directions that franchise fans are sure to get a kick out of. There are so many batshit delights, especially as things escalate towards the finale, but to spoil them would be to ruin Mancini and co.'s grand carnival. Without a doubt, Child's Play is a horror franchise worth treasuring." Stephen Dalton of The Hollywood Reporter also had mostly positive things to say about the film, writing, "the bratty quips and cheerfully nasty murders come thick and fast, with drillings and decapitations, high heels and compressed air canisters all part of their repertoire. Mancini's low-key shooting style also shifts up a gear with slow-motion split-screen action and deranged psycho-lesbian clinches, like Brian De Palma on an indie-movie budget. A lean 91 minutes long, Cult of Chucky is part self-spoofing slasher, part lowbrow bloodbath and all guilty pleasure."

Scott Mendelson of Forbes said, "Cult of Chucky is either the Final Chapter or a New Beginning. Either way, this most tenacious of horror franchises can walk on with its head held high." William Bibbiani, writing for IGN, gave the film 7.4 out of 10, and specified, "Too many horror sequels feel like cheap and soulless cash-ins. Cult of Chucky has big ideas, strong performances and some moments that rank among the best in the series. The other classic slasher franchises may be failing, but lately, Chucky is making entertaining horror sequels look like child's play."

=== Accolades ===
The film received a nomination for Best DVD or Blu-ray Release at the 44th Saturn Awards.

== Sequel ==
In February 2018, a Child's Play television series was announced to be in the works, with involvement from Mancini and producer David Kirschner, and is a continuation of the film's story arc. The series, titled Chucky, premiered in October 2021; features the return of several cast members, including Brad Dourif, Fiona Dourif, Alex Vincent, Christine Elise, Billy Boyd, and Jennifer Tilly. In September 2024, the series was canceled after three seasons.
