= Seed of Chucky =

2004 American black comedy slasher film by Don Mancini

- Theatrical release poster
- Directed by: Don Mancini
- Written by: Don Mancini
- Based on: Characters by Don Mancini
- Produced by: David Kirschner; Corey Sienega
- Starring: Jennifer Tilly; Redman; Hannah Spearritt; John Waters; Billy Boyd; Brad Dourif
- Cinematography: Vernon Layton
- Edited by: Chris Dickens
- Music by: Pino Donaggio
- Production companies: La Sienaga Productions; David Kirschner Productions
- Distributed by: Rogue Pictures (Note: Distributed by Focus Features through the Rogue Pictures banner.)
- Release date: November 12, 2004
- Running time: 86 minutes
- Countries: United States; United Kingdom; Romania
- Language: English
- Budget: $12–29 million
- Box office: $24.8 million

Seed of Chucky is a 2004 black comedy slasher film written and directed by series creator Don Mancini in his directorial debut. The film stars Jennifer Tilly, Redman, Hannah Spearritt, John Waters, Billy Boyd, and Brad Dourif. It is a sequel to Bride of Chucky (1998) and the fifth installment in the Child's Play franchise. The film is set six years after the previous film and follows a young doll named Glen/Glenda, the child of Chucky and Tiffany, resurrecting their parents, causing chaos.

The film, shot in Romania, continues the series' evolution from the pure horror genre of the first three films to a hybrid horror-comedy. It was the last Child's Play film from the original continuity to be released in theaters, with all future installments to be released direct-to-video until the 2019 remake. The film was followed by another sequel, Curse of Chucky, released in 2013.

Seed of Chucky was released on November 12, 2004, by Focus Features under the Rogue Pictures label. It grossed $25 million worldwide against a $12–29 million budget, and received mixed reviews from critics.

== Plot ==
Six years after the previous film, the benevolent and genderfluid living-doll child of Chucky and Tiffany is being held captive by "Psychs", an abusive British ventriloquist. Psychs has mockingly named the doll "Shitface" and regularly mistreats and exploits them. Despite their peaceful nature, Shitface has violent nightmares about murder.

Shitface sees a preview on television for Jennifer Tilly's new film Chucky Goes Psycho which features Chucky and Tiffany dolls repaired from their original remains. Realizing they are their child, Shitface escapes Psychs and tracks the Chucky and Tiffany dolls to a prop room in Hollywood. Shitface uses the Heart of Damballa, a voodoo amulet, to resurrect them. Chucky is shocked at having a child while Tiffany is overjoyed.

Confused about their child's ambiguous gender (them having no genitals) Chucky renames Shitface "Glen", while Tiffany renames them "Glenda". Chucky and Tiffany decapitate a special effects technician with a wire. Jennifer finds the beheaded body and calls the police. Chucky, Tiffany, and Glen/Glenda sneak a ride to her home in her limousine.

Having witnessed their parents murder the technician, Glen/Glenda asks them why they kill. Chucky and Tiffany are taken aback by the question. Tiffany, feeling parental responsibility, tries to force Chucky to stop killing for the sake of their child; Chucky falsely promises to do so. Meanwhile, Jennifer tries to get a role as the Virgin Mary in rapper Redman's feature-film directorial debut. She invites him to her home, intending to seduce him for the role, much to the disgust of her assistant Joan.

Chucky and Tiffany make plans to transfer their souls into Redman and Jennifer. Tiffany knocks them out and uses a turkey baster to inseminate Jennifer with Chucky's semen, intending to use her baby as a host for Glen/Glenda's soul. Chucky takes Glen/Glenda on a secret joyride to kill Pete Peters, a paparazzo who had been following Jennifer around. Glen/Glenda accidentally causes Peters to fall and be soaked in sulfuric acid, killing him. Glen/Glenda is horrified while Chucky is delighted.

Jennifer awakens and senses that she is pregnant, believing Redman is responsible. She confronts Redman who explains this is impossible, as he previously had a vasectomy. He fires Jennifer from his film, dismissing pregnant women as not attractive enough for his vision. Tiffany guts Redman in anger over his misogyny, which Glen/Glenda witnesses.

The next day, Jennifer wakes up to find herself with a full pregnant stomach, a consequence of the voodoo magic. Chucky captures Jennifer and her lovelorn chauffeur Stan to take Redman's place. Jennifer's assistant Joan tries to help but she is killed by Glen/Glenda, revealing that Glen and Glenda are two separate souls in the same body; Glen is a pacifist, while Glenda is a psychopath.

Jennifer birthes twins, a boy and a girl, and Tiffany realizes that both Glen and Glenda can inhabit the two children. However, the chaos causes Chucky to have an epiphany: he has finally accepted his life as a living doll and no longer wishes to become human. Disgusted, Tiffany rejects Chucky and decides to leave him. Enraged, Chucky throws a knife at Jennifer to stop Tiffany from leaving him but Stan jumps in the way, sacrificing himself to save her. The police arrive, forcing three dolls to flee.

Jennifer is rushed to the hospital. Tiffany drugs Jennifer and begins to possess her but Chucky breaks in and kills Tiffany with an axe. Devastated, Glen/Glenda snaps and attacks Chucky, striking him with the axe. Chucky assumes it's Glenda, but Glen reveals it is actually him and not his murderous twin. Glen dismembers Chucky, who praises Glen for his actions before being decapitated. Realizing what he has done, Glen breaks down in tears as Jennifer comforts him.

Five years later, Jennifer is raising Glen and Glenda, having transferred their souls into the bodies of her two children. During a birthday party for the twins, a nanny quits because Glenda scares her. Jennifer beats her to death in a rage, revealing that Tiffany had successfully transferred her soul into Jennifer's body. Meanwhile, Glen opens a birthday present to find Chucky's severed arm, which springs up and grabs him.

== Cast ==
- Brad Dourif as the voice of Chucky
- Jennifer Tilly as herself and the voice of Tiffany Valentine
- Billy Boyd as the voice of Glen / Glenda Ray
- Redman as himself
- Hannah Spearritt as Joan
- John Waters as Pete Peters
- Keith-Lee Castle as Psychs
- Steve Lawton as Stan
- Tony Gardner as himself
- Jason Flemyng as himself playing Santa
- Nicholas Rowe as Lawyer
- Stephanie Chambers as Claudia's mum
- Simon James Morgan as Claudia's dad
- Betty Simons-Denville as Claudia
- Rebecca Santos as Fulvia
- Beans El-Balawi as Human Glen
- Kristina Hewitt as Human Glenda
- Daniel Getzoff as Assistant Director
- Nicola Mycroft as Reporter
- Guy J. Louthan as Don Mancini
- Diana Munteanu as Fan
- Anouk Diks as Interviewer
- Barnaby Thompson as Laughing Puppeteer
- Eliot Mathews as Cop #1
- Adi Handac as Cop #2
- Paul Grossman as Little Boy
- Nadia Dina Ariqat as Britney

== Production ==
Production on a new film called Son of Chucky began on October 18, 1998, two days after the successful release of Bride of Chucky, whose director Ronny Yu was unable to return due to scheduling conflicts. Don Mancini, who is gay and was interested in exploring LGBT-related themes in the next film, decided to write a screenplay inspired by the 1953 cult classic Glen or Glenda in which Chucky's son is an innocent person suffering from gender dysphoria. He also decided to continue the shift in the series towards comedy after noting that horror villains such as Michael Myers, Jason Voorhees, and Freddy Krueger became less scary as they became more familiar with audiences.

Universal Pictures, which produced the previous three films and had expected a more conventional slasher film with the son being a murderous villain, rejected the script with the note "This is too gay." Production ultimately resumed when the project was approved by Focus Features after the successful release of Cabin Fever in 2003, and was ultimately released through Focus' Rogue Pictures. Mancini claimed in a podcast that prior to casting Redman, he had offered to cast Quentin Tarantino as himself but he declined.

Seed of Chucky was filmed almost entirely in Romania at Castel Studios in order to save costs. Mancini tried to replicate the look of older horror films by shooting the film mostly on sound stages and was additionally influenced by the filmmaking styles of Brian De Palma and Dario Argento. All of the animatronic and makeup effects were the handiwork of Effects Designer Tony Gardner, who also appears in the film as himself in a cameo, and his company Alterian, Inc.

== Release and reception ==
=== Box office ===
Seed of Chucky was theatrically released on November 12, 2004, by Rogue Pictures. The film debuted at #4 with $8,774,520 on opening weekend. When the film closed on December 23, 2004, the domestic gross was $17,083,732 and $24,829,644 worldwide.

In Australia, Seed of Chucky opened at #8 with $260,958 for the week of February 6–8, 2005 behind Million Dollar Baby (#2), and Sky Captain and the World of Tomorrow (#6). In Australia, Seed of Chucky was distributed by United International Pictures.

In France, Seed of Chucky opened at #11 with $694,948 for the week of March 2–8, 2005. It opened behind Le Couperet (#2) and the remake of Assault of Precinct 13 (#4). In France, Seed of Chucky was distributed by SND Distribution.

In the United Kingdom, Seed of Chucky opened at #10 with $202,022 for the week of May 13–15, 2005. It opened behind Monster-in-Law (#2), The Jacket (#8), and A Good Woman (#9). In the United Kingdom, Seed of Chucky was distributed by Momentum Pictures.

=== Critical reception ===
On Rotten Tomatoes, the film holds a 36% approval rating based on 80 reviews, with a weighted average of 4.60/10. The critical consensus reads: "Give Seed of Chucky credit for embracing the increasing absurdity of the franchise — even if the end results really aren't all that funny or entertaining." On Metacritic, it has an average score of 46/100, indicating "mixed to average reviews". Audiences polled by CinemaScore gave the film an average grade of "C+" on an A+ to F scale.

Variety gave the film mostly negative review, writing that "Pic simply isn't funny or frightening enough to expand its appeal beyond core fan base." Richard James Havis of The Hollywood Reporter stated that the film lacked a cohesive storyline and scares, writing "This low-concept slasher/horror film suffers from creaky direction, a tatty story line, and -- even worse, considering the genre -- a lack of suspense and shocks." Roger Ebert gave the film two stars out of four stating, "Seed of Chucky is actually two movies, one wretched, the other funny."

In the years since its release, Seed of Chucky has received a critical re-evaluation from retrospective critics and fans, praising its performances and themes of sexuality and self-acceptance, often described as "ahead of its time". In 2023, Out described the film as a "campy cult classic".

=== Accolades ===
List of awards and nominations
Award	Category	Recipients	Result
Fangoria Chainsaw Awards	Best Actress	Jennifer Tilly	Nominated
Fangoria Chainsaw Awards	Best Score	Pino Donaggio	Nominated
MTV Movie Awards	Best Frightened Performance	Jennifer Tilly	Nominated
Sitges - Catalan International Film Festival	Best Film	Don Mancini	Nominated
World Stunt Awards	Best Fire Stunt	Heather Phillips	Nominated
World Stunt Awards	Best Overall Stunt by a Stunt Woman	Heather Phillips	Nominated

== Sequels ==
The film was followed by Curse of Chucky in 2013, Cult of Chucky in 2017, and the TV series Chucky in 2021.
