= Curse of Chucky =

2013 film by Don Mancini

- Home video release poster
- Directed by: Don Mancini
- Written by: Don Mancini
- Based on: Characters by Don Mancini
- Produced by: David Kirschner
- Starring: Fiona Dourif; Danielle Bisutti; Brennan Elliott; Maitland McConnell; Chantal Quesnelle; Summer H. Howell; A Martinez; Brad Dourif
- Cinematography: Michael Marshall
- Edited by: James Coblentz
- Music by: Joseph LoDuca
- Production company: Universal 1440 Entertainment
- Distributed by: Universal Studios Home Entertainment
- Release dates: August 2, 2013 (Fantasia Festival); September 24, 2013 (VOD); October 8, 2013 (DVD/Blu-ray)
- Running time: 96 minutes
- Country: United States
- Language: English
- Budget: $5 million

Curse of Chucky is a 2013 American supernatural slasher film written and directed by Don Mancini, who created the franchise and wrote every previous entry. It is the sixth installment of the Child's Play franchise, following Seed of Chucky (2004). The film stars Fiona Dourif, Danielle Bisutti, Brennan Elliott, Maitland McConnell, Chantal Quesnelle, Summer H. Howell in her feature film debut, with A Martinez, and Brad Dourif as the voice of Chucky.

Curse of Chucky sees a return to the franchise's source material, bringing back the straightforward horror elements found in the first Child's Play film. In the United States, it premiered via VOD on September 24, 2013, followed by a DVD and Blu-ray Disc release on October 8, 2013. It received generally positive reviews from critics and was also turned into a scare zone for 2013's annual Halloween Horror Nights at Universal Studios Hollywood. Though Curse of Chucky was made with a direct-to-video release in mind, it was also seen theatrically in several countries, like Brazil. The film was followed by Cult of Chucky in 2017.

== Plot ==
Four years after the events of the living nightmare of Jennifer Tilly and the killing of Chucky, a mysterious package arrives at the home of Sarah Pierce and her paraplegic daughter Nica. Inside, they find a "Good Guys" doll. Confused, Sarah throws the doll away. That night, Nica is awakened by Sarah screaming and encounters her corpse; the death is ruled a suicide.

Nica is visited by her older sister, Barb, her husband Ian, daughter Alice, live-in nanny Jill (with whom Barb is secretly having an affair), and priest Father Frank. Alice discovers Chucky and bonds with him. That night, Chucky secretly poisons Father Frank. Becoming sick, he leaves and is decapitated in a car accident. Police officer Stanton heads to the Pierce house, knowing Father Frank was visiting.

While the family watches old home movies, Nica notices someone peculiar in the footage. She researches Chucky and learns that he was sent from an evidence depository. She finds news reports online of previous murders linked to him, along with a picture of Charles Lee Ray, Chucky's human form. She recognizes Ray as the peculiar man from their home movie.

Chucky fatally electrocutes Jill. Barb leaves to look for Alice and awakens Ian, who reveals that he placed a hidden camera in Chucky and knows of her affair. In the attic, Barb finds Chucky and discovers he has been concealing stitches and wounds on his face beneath a layer of plastic. He comes to life and stabs her in the eye before chasing Nica.

Nica wakes up Ian, who tries to escape with her. However, when she grabs an axe to defend herself, Ian accuses her of being the killer. Nica suffers a heart attack and passes out, and then she awakens taped up by Ian. After Chucky murders Ian with the axe, Nica frees herself but is thrown off the balcony in the main hall. She asks why he murdered her family and Chucky explains that when he was human, he was a friend of their family and in love with Sarah. In 1988, he murdered Nica's father and kidnapped Sarah, but was found by the police. Believing Sarah led them to him, Charles stabbed her in the stomach, resulting in Nica's paraplegia. He then fled, leading to his death.

In an ensuing struggle, Nica gets the upper hand and stabs Chucky. However, he reanimates as Stanton arrives. Nica is arrested, found guilty of the murders, and is institutionalized. Stanton leaves to deliver Chucky to an unknown buyer, only to be murdered by Tiffany Valentine, who mails Chucky to Alice. After smothering Alice's grandmother, Chucky begins to enact a voodoo chant to transfer his soul into Alice's body.

In a post-credits scene, Chucky is mailed to Andy Barclay, now an adult. However, Andy surprises him first and shoots him with a shotgun.

== Cast ==
- Fiona Dourif as Nica Pierce
- Brad Dourif as the voice of Chucky
  - Debbie Lee Carrington as Chucky (in-suit performer)
- Danielle Bisutti as Barb Pierce
- Brennan Elliott as Ian
- Maitland McConnell as Jill
- Chantal Quesnelle as Sarah Pierce
- Summer H. Howell as Alice Pierce
- A Martinez as Father Frank
- Jennifer Tilly as Tiffany Valentine
- Adam Hurtig as Officer Stanton
- Jordan Gavaris as Ex-Delivery guy
- Alex Vincent as Andy Barclay

== Production ==
In an August 2008 interview, Don Mancini and David Kirschner spoke of a planned reboot of the Chucky franchise, to be written and directed by Mancini. They described their choice of a remake over a sequel as a response to the will of the fans, who "want to see a scary Chucky movie again... to go back to the straightforward horror rather than the horror comedy." They indicated that Brad Dourif would return as the voice of Chucky.

In a subsequent interview, Mancini described the remake as a darker and scarier retelling of the original film, but one that, while having new twists and turns, would not stray too far from the original concept. At a 2009 horror convention, Dourif confirmed his role in the remake. At a reunion panel at the Mad Monster Party horror and sci-fi convention, the cast and crew from the original film confirmed that both a remake and a spin-off are in development. Writer Don Mancini and producer David Kirschner worked on a sequel then titled Revenge of Chucky.

The sequel entered the production in 2012, entitled Curse of Chucky, and was intended for a direct-to-video release.

=== Filming ===
The film began production in early September 2012 in Winnipeg, Manitoba, Canada, and ended in mid-October.

Brad Dourif portrayed Charles Lee Ray in his human form for the first time since Child's Play (1988), in flashback scenes set before the first film. Makeup, lighting and strategic camera angles were used to make Dourif appear younger.

== Release ==
Curse of Chucky had its world premiere on August 2, 2013, at the Fantasia Festival, in Montreal, and its European premiere at the London FrightFest Film Festival on August 22, accompanied by screenings of the original trilogy of Child's Play films. In the U.S., the film premiered via VOD on September 24, 2013. The DVD/Blu-ray was released on October 8, 2013, and domestically grossed $3,821,602 in the first month.

== Reception ==
On Rotten Tomatoes, 78% of 18 critics have given the film a positive review, with an average rating of 6.3/10. The site's critics consensus states: "The franchise hex of disappointing sequels is broken by going back to basics in this chilling entry, restoring a sense of playfulness to the Chucky saga." According to Metacritic, the film received "mixed or average" reviews based on an average score of 58 out of 100 from 5 critics.

An early review posted on Bloody Disgusting on August 2, 2013, was very favorable of the film. In it, Brad Miska stated, "Curse of Chucky may just be the best home video sequel since Wrong Turn 2. It's alarmingly good, which puts pressure on Universal to answer as to why they didn't let Mancini shoot this for theaters." He continued to say, "Chucky fans should rejoice... Curse of Chucky is clearly going to re-ignite the franchise for years to come." Ryan Larson of Shock Till You Drop also wrote a mostly positive review, saying, "the movie does so much right that it's easy to overlook the very few flaws it has. The pacing and writing coincide to create a fun blood-soaked jaunt that never gets boring or dull." He goes on to praise the director, pointing out that "Mancini (pulling double duty as writer as well as director) does a great job at introducing and ushering off characters in a fashion that doesn't bog the film down with a bunch of characters who get three minutes of film time before getting the axe, or butcher knife in this case. The kills are kitschy, but in the best way possible, waxing nostalgic of the slasher films of the late eighties and early nineties."

In Brazil, Chucky inspired two episodes of the "Hidden Camera" (Câmeras Escondidas) show broadcast by the local SBT channel.

== Accolades ==
At the film's world premiere at the Montreal Fantasia Festival, it received a Gold Award for Best International Feature.

The film also received a nomination for Best DVD or Blu-ray Release at the 40th Saturn Awards.

== Sequels ==
The film was followed by Cult of Chucky in 2017 and the TV series Chucky in 2021.
