= Don Mancini =

American screenwriter, director and producer

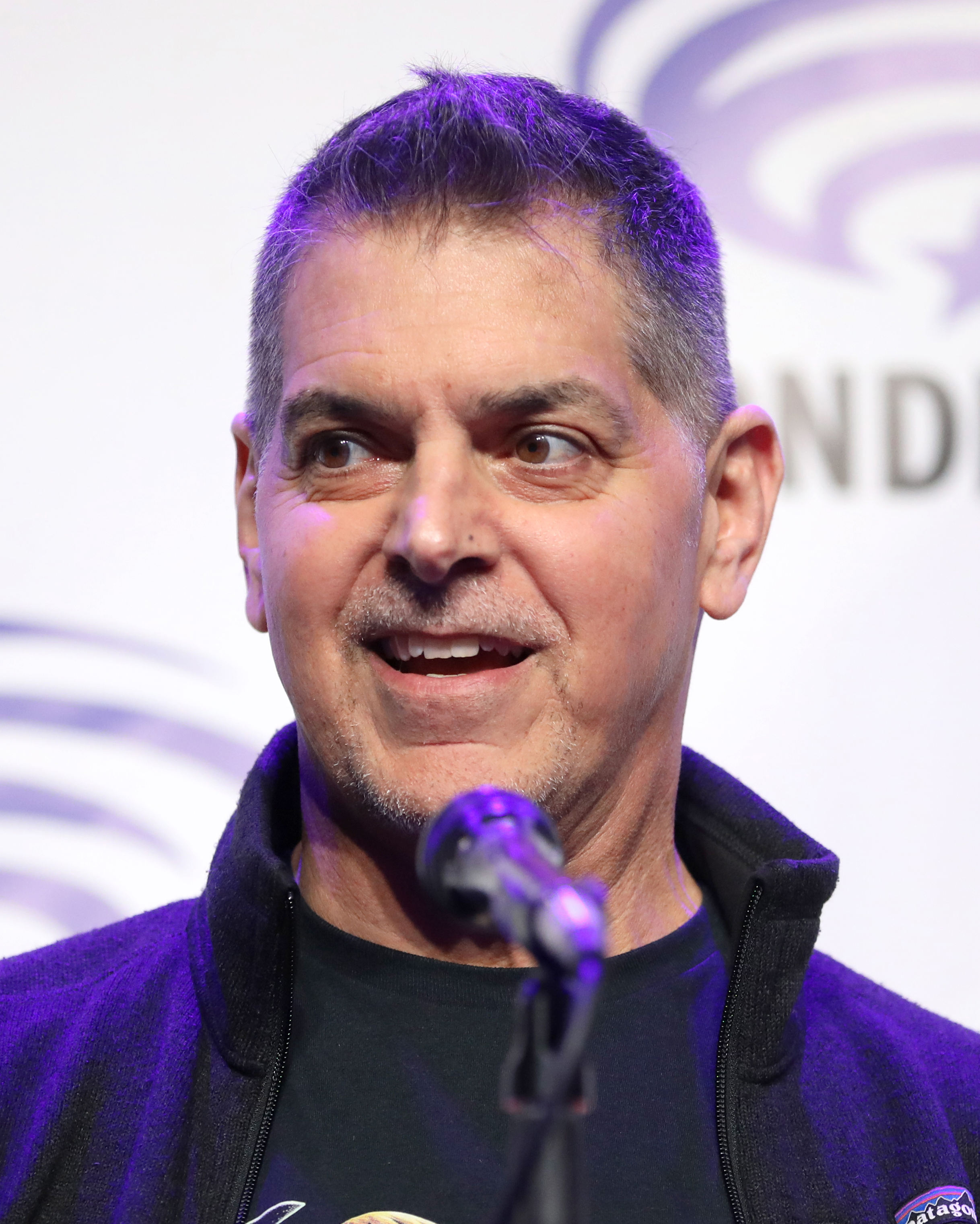
- Mancini at the 2024 WonderCon
- Born: George Donald Mancini; January 25, 1963 (age 63)
- Other names: Kit Du Bois; Donald G. Mancini
- Education: St. Christopher's School
- Alma mater: University of California, Los Angeles; Columbia University
- Occupations: Screenwriter; director; producer
- Years active: 1988–present

George Donald Mancini (born January 25, 1963) is an American screenwriter, director, and producer. He is best known for creating and running the Child's Play franchise (1988–present).

== Career ==
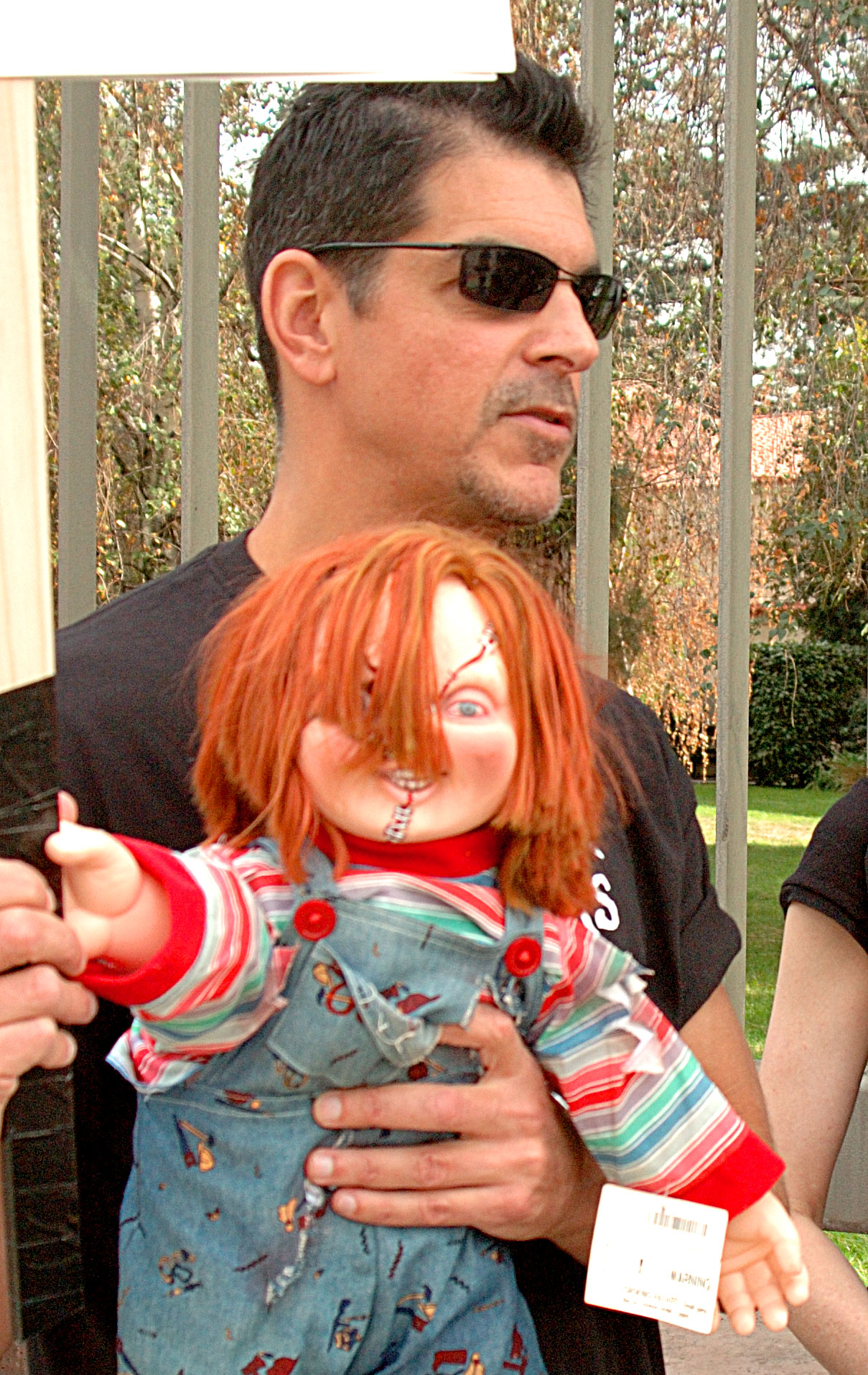
Don Mancini during the 2007–08 Writers Guild of America strike, holding a Chucky doll.

Having been a horror fan since his childhood, Mancini's inspiration for Child's Play were films like Trilogy of Terror and The Twilight Zone episode "Living Doll"; aware of the "killer doll" as a horror trope, Mancini realized that the concept had never been executed as a feature-length film with animatronic effects work. As a film student at UCLA in the mid-1980s, Mancini was amused by the popularity of the Cabbage Patch Kids line of dolls, and that the ubiquitous dolls were disappearing from toy shelves and prompting physical fights between parents. Mancini's father had worked in the advertising industry all his life, and he knew how effective marketing could result in consumer bedlam. Based on this, Mancini wanted to write a dark satire about how marketing affected children, with his first effort being as the co-writer of Child's Play (1988).

Mancini wrote all seven films in the original Child's Play film series, and was the executive producer for Bride of Chucky and Cult of Chucky. He began directing Child's Play franchise entries with Seed of Chucky (2004), followed by Curse of Chucky (2013) and Cult of Chucky (2017), and was the creator and showrunner of the Chucky TV series. He was not involved with the 2019 reboot.

In 2007, he won the EyeGore award for career contributions to the horror genre. He sometimes goes by the pseudonym Kit Dubois. Mancini attended St. Christopher's School in Richmond, Virginia, University of California in Los Angeles, and Columbia University (Brad Dourif was among his teachers) in New York City.

== Personal life ==
Mancini grew up in Richmond, Virginia. He attended the University of California, Los Angeles, studying film. He is gay. He has described consciously incorporating queer elements into the Child's Play films; his experiences as a gay man, including receiving bullying and abuse from his father because of it, informed Mancini's creative direction on the Chucky TV series, which features a gay protagonist.

== Filmography ==
=== As director ===
Film
Year	Title	Director	Writer	Executive Producer	Notes
1988	Cellar Dweller	No	Yes	No	Credited as "Kit Du Bois"
1988	Child's Play	No	Yes	No	
1990	Child's Play 2	No	Yes	No	
1991	Child's Play 3	No	Yes	No	
1998	Bride of Chucky	No	Yes	Yes	
2004	Seed of Chucky	Yes	Yes	No	
2013	Curse of Chucky	Yes	Yes	No	
2017	Cult of Chucky	Yes	Yes	Yes	

Television
Year	Title	Director	Writer	Producer	Notes
1990	Tales from the Crypt	No	Yes	No	Episode: "Fitting Punishment"
2015	Hannibal	No	Yes	Yes	Writer (2 episodes) / Producer (8 episodes)
2016–2017	Channel Zero	No	Yes	Supervising	Writer (3 episodes) / Supervising producer (6 episodes)
2021–2024	Chucky	Yes	Yes	Executive	Creator and executive producer (24 episodes) Director (Episode: "Death on Denial") Director and writer (Episode: "Death by Misadventure") Writer (8 episodes)

Acting roles

Year	Title	Role	Notes	Ref.
2026	Carrie	Man at the Prom	Uncredited; 2 episodes	

== Awards ==
Award	Category	Nominated work	Result
Saturn Awards	Best Writing (with Tom Holland and John Lafia)	Child's Play (1988)	Nominated
Saturn Awards	Best Writing	Bride of Chucky (1998)	Nominated
Saturn Awards	Special Recognition Award	Cult of Chucky (2017) and Child's Play franchise	Won
Fangoria Chainsaw Awards	Best Screenplay	Bride of Chucky (1998)	Nominated
