= List of Child's Play characters =

Child's Play is an American horror franchise that consists of eight slasher films, a television series, novels, a video game, and numerous comic books. The main antagonist is Chucky. Chucky is the embodiment of Charles Lee Ray, the notorious Lakeshore Strangler whose soul passed onto a Good Guy Doll. Chucky pursues a variation of victims in each installment, usually to possess a new human host but now he finally accepts being in a dolls body and continues killing people everywhere he goes. Recurring characters in the series include Chucky's first target and Child's Play trilogy protagonist Andy Barclay, and Chucky's wife/partner Tiffany Valentine. The 2019 remake starring Aubrey Plaza has similar themes but is not connected to the original franchise. The 2021 television series is a continuation of the original franchise and sees the return of several characters, including Andy Barclay, while also introducing several new characters.

== Cast and characters ==
List indicators
- A dark grey cell indicates the character was not in the film or that the character's presence in the film has not yet been announced.
- ^{A} indicates an appearance through archival footage taken from a previous film in the franchise.
- ^{C} indicates a cameo appearance.
- ^{H} indicates an appearance as the human form of an occasionally non-human character.
- ^{V} indicates a voice-only role.
- ^{Y} indicates a younger version of a character

Character	Film series							Reboot film	Television series		
Character	Child's Play	Child's Play 2	Child's Play 3	Bride of Chucky	Seed of Chucky	Curse of Chucky	Cult of Chucky	Child's Play	Season 1	Season 2	Season 3
Chucky	Brad Dourif^{VH}	Brad Dourif^{V}	Brad Dourif^{V}	Brad Dourif^{V}	Brad Dourif^{V}	Brad Dourif^{VH}	Brad Dourif^{V} Fiona Dourif^{H}	Mark Hamill^{V}	Brad Dourif^{V} David Kohlsmith^{Y} Tyler Barish^{Y} Fiona Dourif^{VHY}		
Chucky	Edan Gross^{V}	Edan Gross^{V}	Edan Gross^{V}	Rebecca Brenner ^{V}	Brad Dourif^{V}	Edan Gross^{V}	Edan Gross^{V}	Mark Hamill^{V}	Brad Dourif^{V} David Kohlsmith^{Y} Tyler Barish^{Y} Fiona Dourif^{VHY}		
Andy Barclay	Alex Vincent	Alex Vincent	Justin Whalin Alex Vincent^{Y}^{P}			Alex Vincent^{C}	Alex Vincent	Gabriel Bateman	Alex Vincent	Alex Vincent	Alex Vincent
Karen Barclay	Catherine Hicks	Catherine Hicks^{P}	Catherine Hicks^{P}			Catherine Hicks^{P}		Aubrey Plaza			
Detective Mike Norris	Chris Sarandon					Chris Sarandon^{A}^{P}		Brian Tyree Henry			
Eddie Caputo	Neil Giuntoli								Ivan DiCario^{Y}		
Kyle		Christine Elise				Christine Elise^{P}	Christine Elise^{C}		Christine Elise	Christine Elise	
Mr. Christopher Sullivan / Henry Kaslan		Peter Haskell	Peter Haskell					Tim Matheson			
Tiffany Valentine Jennifer Tilly				Jennifer Tilly^{VH}	Jennifer Tilly^{VH}	Jennifer Tilly^{VH}	Jennifer Tilly^{VH}		Jennifer Tilly Blaise Crocker^{Y}	Jennifer Tilly	Jennifer Tilly
Glen Tilly				Infant cameo	Beans El-Balawi^{H} Billy Boyd^{V}					Lachlan Watson Billy Boyd^{V}	
Glenda Tilly				Infant cameo	Kristina Hewitt^{H} Billy Boyd^{V}					Lachlan Watson Billy Boyd^{V}	
Nica Pierce						Fiona Dourif	Fiona Dourif		Fiona Dourif	Fiona Dourif	Fiona Dourif
Alice Pierce						Summer H. Howell	Summer H. Howell^{VH}				
Jake Wheeler									Zackary Arthur	Zackary Arthur	Zackary Arthur
Devon Evans									Björgvin Arnarson	Björgvin Arnarson	Björgvin Arnarson
Lexy Cross									Alyvia Alyn Lind	Alyvia Alyn Lind	Alyvia Alyn Lind

== A ==
=== Andy Barclay ===
(played by Alex Vincent and Justin Whalin) - The original protagonist is constantly pursued by Chucky so he could transfer his soul into the boy's body, as well as successfully frame him for the murders. He appears in there first three films, as well as Curse of Chucky, Cult of Chucky, and the Chucky TV series.

=== Angela ===
(played by Marina Stephenson Ker) - A paranoid schizophrenic mental patient. Angela, formerly homeless, now believes that she is dead. She has formed a strong bond with Claire. During Nica's first therapy session with the group, Angela tells her Chucky called her and said that Alice was "not okay". Later, Angela is killed by Chucky for believing he was an audio and visual hallucination. Appears in Cult of Chucky.

=== Alice Pierce ===
(played by Summer H. Howell) - Nica's niece. Alice comes to visit Nica after the death of Sarah. Alice is manipulated by Chucky and used as his pawn like Andy Barclay was in the original installment. After the death of her family, Alice is sent to live with her paternal grandmother and finds Chucky waiting for her. Chucky attempts to pass his soul into Alice's body. It is unclear if Chucky was successful as Alice's grandmother is shown sitting up with a plastic bag over her head, slowly dying.

In the next film, Alice learns she has been put under the guardianship of Chucky's girlfriend, Tiffany Valentine, who tells Nica that Alice died. Later in the film, it is revealed that Chucky was able to possess Alice but she "died" after one of Chucky's intended victims fought back. At the film's conclusion, Tiffany shows some remorse over Alice's death. Alice Pierce appears in Curse of Chucky and Cult of Chucky.

=== Nurse Ashley ===
(played by Ali Tataryn) - is a nurse, working at the Harrogate mental facility. Appears in Cult of Chucky.

=== Adam ===
(played by Billy Stevenson) - is Kyle's boyfriend. Appears and dies in Child's Play 2.

=== Annie Gilpin ===
(played by Sarah Sherman)- (died October 31, 2023 White House) is Henry Collins' nanny who believes in the supernatural. She is killed when her face is sliced by the chandelier whose bolts Chucky had loosened. Appears in the TV series.

== B ==
=== Barbara "Barb" Pierce ===
(played by Danielle Bisutti) is Nica's sister. Barb is a manipulative and selfish woman who intends to move Nica from her home to collect insurance money from her mother's death. Chucky kills her by stabbing her in the eye and throwing her down a flight of stairs. Appears in Curse of Chucky and archive footage in Cult of Chucky.

=== Cadet Lieutenant Colonel Brett Shelton ===
(played by Travis Fine) - one of Andy Barclay's superior officers at Kent Military Camp. He would often use his power to humiliate Andy in front of the other cadets. He is killed by Chucky when paintball rounds are switched for live rounds. Appears in Child's Play 3.

=== Botnick ===
Botnick (played by Andrew Robinson) was the cruel barber at Kent Military Camp. After shaving students he would often comment "Presto, you're bald." After giving Whitehurst a haircut, Botnick decided it would be fun to give a doll, Chucky, a shave. However, Chucky turned the tables and slit Botnick's throat with a razor. Appears in Child's Play 3.

=== Bob Barclay ===
Bob Barclay (played by Tom Holland) is the deceased husband of Karen Barclay and the father of Andy.

- The original script details him dying in a car accident.
- The only time we see him is in a photograph on Andy's shelf in his bedroom. In reality, the photograph is of director Tom Holland.

=== Bree Wheeler ===
(played by Lexa Doig) - Junior's mother, Logan's wife, and Jake's aunt. Appears in the TV series.

=== Britney Spears ===
(played by Nadia Dina Ariqat) - is a singer/songwriter, that drove in front of Chucky and Glen on their boy's night out. Appears in Seed of Chucky.

== C ==
=== Charles Lee "Chucky" Ray ===
(played and voiced by Brad Dourif) - The main villain of the series and the primary character of the fourth and fifth films. A merciless murderer whose soul gets stuck in a doll. He usually kills 'anyone' who gets in his way with a knife and frames the person in each film for them. Aside from being a deranged killer, he often spouts humorous yet profane insults.

He is the only character to appear in all of the films and television series of the franchise.

=== Claire ===
(Played by Grace Lynn Kung) - A mental patient who is hostile towards Nica. Claire blames Nica for the deaths at the hospital but realizes it is Chucky who is responsible. Claire is torn to shreds by glass shards while strapped down to a table by Chucky. Appears in Cult of Chucky.

=== Christopher Sullivan ===
(played by Peter Haskell) - The greedy and arrogant CEO of Play Pals Toys Inc., First appears in Child's Play 2 where he is updated by Mattson an executive about the company's bad publicity due to Andy's Good Guy Doll supposedly becoming possessed by the soul of Charles Lee Ray. He also tries to protect the company's reputation from angry stockholders and the public in general. He also appears in Child's Play 3 when he moves Good Guys Toys forward with producing more dolls, however, he is killed by Chucky when he accesses Sullivan's office computer to find Andy in Military School. Appears in Child's Play 2 and Child's Play 3.

=== Colonel Cochrane ===
(played by Dakin Matthews) - is the commandant of Kent Military School. Appears in Child's Play 3.

=== Sgt. Clark ===
(played by Burke Byrnes) - is an officer at the Kent Military School. Appears in Child's Play 3.

=== Nurse Carlos ===
(played by Zak Santiago) - is a nurse at the Harrogate mental facility. Appears in Cult of Chucky.

=== Claudia ===
(played by Bethany Simons-Danville) - is a little girl imagined by Glen, and was part of his murderous fantasy nightmare in which he massacres her family. Appears in Seed of Chucky.

=== Caroline Cross ===
(played by Carina London Battrick) - The younger daughter of Michelle and Nathan Cross and Lexy's little sister, who was born and raised in Hackensack, New Jersey with her older biological sister. She is a gifted little girl but unknown to both her family, she has both psychopathic tendencies and sociopathic tendencies which remained dormant for years of her whole life until Chucky triggered them. From the first moment Caroline saw Chucky, she becomes enamored and obsessed with Chucky and develops a hyper fixation and both a close bond and a special connection towards him. Chucky murdered both of Caroline's biological parents, but she still stays on his side and later becomes his accomplice, sidekick, helper, minion, protégé, apprentice, his follower, his current permeant best friend, and both his and Tiffany’s adopted daughter, as well as Glen’s and Glenda’s adopted sister. Caroline also later becomes the new sworn enemy of her older biological sister Lexy Cross, Devon Evans, and Jake Wheeler. Appears in the TV series.

== D ==
=== David Collins ===
(played by Gordon Michael Woolvett) - a friend of Jesse and Jade. David is inadvertently killed by Chucky and Tiffany when they reveal themselves. David runs onto the freeway in a panic and is killed by a passing semi. Appears in Bride of Chucky.

=== Diane ===
(played by Janet Kidder) - is part of a con artist couple, with her husband Russ. Appears in Bride of Chucky.

=== Daniel Pierce ===
(played by Kyle Nobess) is the late husband of Sarah, and was one of the only known victims of the Lakeshore Strangler, Charles Lee Ray. Appears in Curse of Chucky

=== Devon Evans ===
(played by Björgvin Arnarson) - Jake's crush and later boyfriend, who tries to prove Jake's innocence after he is deemed a suspect in Chucky's recent murders. He runs a true crime podcast called the Hackenslash. Appears in the TV series.

== E ==
=== Eddie Caputo ===
(played by Neil Giuntoli) Charles Lee Ray's original partner in crime. Eddie was a friend of Chucky's while he was still a human. Eddie met him in a foster home for orphans, where Charles told him notoriously distorted tales, and even learned bad words from him. That same day, Charles assassinated the janitor, amputated his hand, and placed a "hook" there, to make him pass as the eponymous captain. There Charles took the other boys with Eddie to play at defeating Hook, who was the dead janitor. The other boys fled in horror, while Eddie touched the neck of the corpse with worms with a stick, while Charles told him "You have guts, boy." Before leaving the foster home, Charles presented Eddie with the dead janitor's hand as a token of sympathy. In 1988, Eddie abandons Chucky during a chase with Chicago police, ultimately leading to his capture and Chucky's death. Before he died, Chucky vowed to get revenge on him and returns to his house in doll form. Eddie is killed when his house is filled with gas and explodes. Appears in Child's Play and the TV series.

=== Elizabeth Kettlewell ===
(played by Beth Grant) - Andy's teacher. While Elizabeth Kettlewell reads the story of Pinocchio to the class, she is briefly interrupted when Andy tells off Rick Spires for deliberately flicking him in the back of the head and, without letting Andy vouch for himself, warns him that she doesn't tolerate troublemakers and adds that the only thing new students should worry about is trying to stay on her good side. When the school bell rings for the end of the final class period, Ms. Kettlewell orders the students to clear their desks before leaving and, while checking over the students' tests, discovers obscenity written over Andy's paper, which had been written by Chucky, who'd followed Andy to school. Blaming Andy for the writing and forcing him to stay after school following the bell ringing for student dismissal (but allowing the rest of the class to leave and reminding them to study for the following day's spelling test), despite Andy vouching that he didn't do it, Ms. Kettlewell orders him to put his head down on the desk, throws and locks Chucky (who'd been hiding in the toy cupboard) in the closet, locks the classroom door, and goes to telephone Phil and Joanne Simpson that Andy is being kept after school. While she is gone, Andy escapes the classroom through a window when Chucky starts calling out from the closet. Coming back and finding the classroom empty, Ms. Kettlewell hears noises in the closet and thinks Andy is hiding in there, not noticing the open window. She opens the closet, but finds it empty and briefly gets scared when a dodgeball falls down from a shelf onto her. As Ms. Kettlewell puts the dodgeball back, Chucky stabs her with an air gun, which sends her crashing back into the classroom, and cheekily tells Ms. Kettlewell that she's been very naughty while brandishing a yardstick. Injured from the air gun, all Ms. Kettlewell can do is scream in horror as Chucky uses the yardstick to beat her to death.

Later on, Chucky recalls Ms. Kettlewell as he brags about how he always enjoys the looks on his victims' faces before he murders them. Ms. Kettlewell appears in Child's Play 2 and is mentioned in Cult of Chucky, and the Chucky Television Show.

=== Major Ellis ===
(played by Matthew Walker) - is Shelton's assistant at the Kent Military School. He appears to be good friends with Shelton. Appears in Child's Play 3.

== F ==
=== Father Frank ===
(played by A Martinez) - Friend of Nica's sister, Barb. Father Frank is a recovering alcoholic who attempts to convince Nica to move out of her house. He is poisoned by Chucky and decapitated in an automobile accident. Appears in Curse of Chucky.

=== Dr. Foley ===
(Played by Michael Therriault) - A psychologist treating Nica. Dr. Foley is later revealed to hypnotize and rape his patients, including Nica. Chucky is both disgusted and impressed by this, and later crushes Dr. Foley's head while possessing Nica. Appears in Cult of Chucky.

=== Father Bryce ===
(played by Devon Sawa) - (died 2022, Burlington County, New Jersey) was the Headmaster of Incarnate Lord Catholic School. He died during Good Chucky's exorcism when Good Chucky tried to possess his body. Appears in the TV series.

=== Fulvia ===
(played by Rebecca Santos) - is the nanny for Tiffany. She was killed by Tiffany. Appears in Seed of Chucky.

== G ==
=== Gabrielle ===
Mentioned in Child's Play 2 (1990 film)

Gabrielle is the girlfriend of Play Pals, Inc. executive Mattson. When Mattson drives off in his car after work, he uses his phone to call Gabrielle who inadvertently reminds Mattson to purchase vodka for their two-week anniversary celebration. After Mattson's death, Gabrielle is never mentioned again.

- In a deleted scene Mattson uses his car phone to call his wife and lies to her about being stuck late at work. After he hangs up his car phone he then picks it up and calls his girlfriend Gabrielle.

=== G.G. ===
==== Glen Tilly/Ray ====
Glen (voiced by Billy Boyd and in human form portrayed by Beans Balawi in the film, Lachlan Watson in the series) - Chucky and Tiffany's original child and Glenda's twin. They were an orphan for the first six years of their life until they saw their parents on television. Glen is a good person and doesn't like violence and does not like murder, unlike their parents. Though Tiffany promised them that they will refrain from killing, Chucky tries to get Glen involved in the family business. They fear but still love their dad due to the fact they killed him in a misunderstanding. They are the only living doll character not to be voiced by an Academy Award nominee. Glen appears in Bride of Chucky (at the end as an infant) and Seed of Chucky. They do not appear in Curse of Chucky, nor is there any direct mention of them, although they were indirectly mentioned when Chucky was mentioning the families that "Come and Gone". They were mentioned in the Chucky series where Chucky talks to Jake about them being genderfluid. Jake questions if he's okay with it to which Chucky replies "I'm not a monster". Glen returns in the second season, along with their twin Glenda, with both characters portrayed by Lachlan Watson. Glen is portrayed as a long-haired non-binary individual, sharing a boyfriend with their short-haired twin sibling, both of whom have forgotten that they were a doll and knew that Chucky was their father, bar occasional nightmares. Unaware of their mother's true identity as Tiffany, believing her to be Jennifer Tilly, their legal name is revealed to be Glen Tilly. After Nica Pierce accidentally shoots Glen after trying to kill Tiffany, they are taken to the hospital where they are not expected to make it. To save their life, Tiffany transfers both theirs and Glenda's souls back into their doll body. They then decide to rename themselves "G.G." and go traveling to England to discover their roots. Since Voodoo/Vodun derives from African religious practices, Glen's/Glenda's/G.G.'s 'fraternal twin' status may also stem from beliefs and superstitions about fraternal twins, depending upon the region.

==== Glenda Tilly/Ray ====
Glenda (voiced by Billy Boyd and in human form played by Kristina Hewitt in the film, Lachlan Watson in the series) - Chucky and Tiffany's second child and the twin of Glen. They were originally Glen's alter ego for a brief time before they were reborn as a human. Unlike Glen, they are violent, sadistic, and cruel. They are even more ruthless than their father, implying they will possibly take on the family business. They first appear in Seed of Chucky. In the Chucky TV series, Tiffany mentions that the suitcase bomb she uses to blow up Charles Lee Ray's childhood home was a gift from Glenda and says "They have an exquisite taste". Glenda officially returns in the second season, along with their twin Glen, with both characters portrayed by Lachlan Watson. Glenda is portrayed as a short-haired non-binary individual, sharing a boyfriend with their long-haired twin sibling, both of whom have forgotten that they were a doll and knew that Chucky was their father, bar occasional nightmares. Unlike what was implied about them before, Glenda is shown to be a goodhearted person in spite of their violent tendencies, which is instead shown to be out of desperation rather than true malice. Unaware of their mother's true identity as Tiffany, believing her to be Jennifer Tilly, their legal name is revealed to be Glenda Tilly. After Glen is accidentally shot by Nica Pierce who was trying to kill Tiffany, Glenda has their mother transfer both theirs and Glen's souls back into their doll body. Renaming themselves "G.G.", they decide to travel to England to discover their roots.

=== Good Guy Dolls ===
(voiced by Edan Gross in the first three films and Nick Fisher in the television series) - dolls aimed at young children and are programmed to say 3 sentences and have random names, including "Tommy", "Paulie", "Larry", "Oscar", "Charlie", "Billy", and "Joseph". Given that Charles Lee Ray's real nickname was "Chucky", he adopts it for his doll persona as well. They were created and produced by the Play Pals toy factory, which eventually went bankrupt after Charles Lee Ray's possessed one of their dolls and began committing murders. They became highly sought-after collectibles with vintage Good Guy dolls going from anywhere between $500 and $1500, with an increased price for ones that happened to also be named "Chucky". Both Chucky and Tiffany would later turn some of them into personal assassins by copying Chucky's soul into them.

=== Grace Poole ===
(played by Grace Zabriskie) - a social worker in charge of the group home which houses Andy. Chucky comes to the group home in pursuit of Andy and kills Grace with several stab wounds to the heart. Appears in Child's Play 2 and is mentioned in Cult of Chucky.

=== Grant Collins ===
(played by Jackson Kelly) - President Collins' eldest son. A lonely, social media-obsessed teen, Grant forms a relationship with Lexy when she reaches out to him to help find her sister and, unbeknownst to him, gain access to the White House to stop Chucky. Appears in the TV series.

== H ==
=== Harold Whitehurst ===
(played by Dean Jacobson) - Andy's cowardly friend and roommate at Kent Military Academy. Harold courageously sacrifices his own life by jumping on a live grenade Chucky set off to prevent it from injuring other cadets. His death greatly upsets both his crush and Andy. Appears in Child's Play 3.

=== Howard Fitzwater ===
(played by Alexis Arquette) - Also known as Damien Baylock. Howard was dating Tiffany at the time she acquired Chucky's remains and resurrected him. Chucky kills Howard by smothering him with a pillow after ripping off his lip piercings. Appears in Bride of Chucky.

== I ==
=== Ian ===
(played by Brennan Elliott) - Brother-in-law to Nica. Ian visits Nica after the death of Sarah. He is killed when Chucky slices off his jaw with an ax. Appears in Curse of Chucky.

=== Ivers ===
(played by Donna Eskra) - is a student at the Kent Military School, and best friend of Kristen De Silva. Appears in Child's Play 3.

== J ==
=== Jack Santos ===
(played by Tommy Swerdlow) - Mike's partner was also investigating Andy's babysitter's death. At the beginning of the first film, he was mostly the cop who drove Mike's car to chase Eddie Caputo in his van. He was also one of the police officers that believed Andy was the killer. In the end, he tried to show Mike that Chucky wasn't alive but was nearly killed by him and then he believed that Barclays and Mike were telling the truth. He only appeared in the first film.

=== Jade Kincaid ===
(played by Katherine Heigl) - girlfriend, and later wife, of Jesse. Her uncle Warren is killed by Chucky and Tiffany early in the film. In the end, Jade shoots Chucky and she and Jesse leave the scene. She also appears with Jesse in another struggle with Chucky in a comic book continuation. Appears in Bride of Chucky.

=== Jake Wheeler ===
(played by Zackary Arthur) - The main protagonist of the television series. Jake is a teenager who is thrown into Chucky's chaos after he purchases the Good Guy doll at a garage sale.

=== Jennifer Tilly ===
(played by herself) exaggerated version of Tilly, herself, and Tiffany's idol. Appears in Seed of Chucky and the TV series. Tiffany was successful in transferring her soul into Tilly's body while she is in her doll form locked in a cage handling the bills, paychecks, and fan mail.

=== Jesse Miller ===
(played by Nick Stabile) - a former friend of Tiffany Ray and boyfriend, later husband of Jade. He was greatly disliked by Jade's uncle and believed to be responsible for his death until Chucky and Tiffany reveal themselves. In the end, Jade kills Chucky and she and Jesse leave the scene. He also appears in a Chucky comic continuation. Appears in Bride of Chucky.

=== Jill ===
(played by Maitland McConnell) - live-in nanny of Alice and was having an affair with Barb even though she was married to Ian. Chucky electrocutes her to death. Appears in Curse of Chucky.

=== Joan ===
(played by Hannah Spearritt) - Jennifer Tilly's assistant. She is killed by Glenda with fire. Appears in Seed of Chucky.

=== Joanne Simpson ===
(played by Jenny Agutter) - Andy's foster parent in the second installment. Chucky arrives at their house in pursuit of Andy, killing her husband and slashing her throat. Appears in Child's Play 2.

=== John Bishop ===
(played by Raymond Oliver) Also known as Dr. Death, John was a friend of Chucky's before he was killed with his voodoo doll by Chucky . He taught Chucky about the world of voodoo and his god, Damballa. Chucky returns in the doll form for information and kills John by mangling a voodoo doll. Appears in Child's Play.

=== Junior Wheeler ===
(played by Teo Briones) Jake's cousin and the son of Logan and Bree, and Lexy's boyfriend until episode 6. A star athlete, Junior is pushed by his father to be as successful as possible. He has an antagonistic relationship with Jake, openly discussing his sexuality in front of his homophobic father and blaming him for the murders surrounding them. After failing to corrupt Jake or Lexy, Chucky gains Junior's trust and convinces him to beat Logan to death, tricking him into believing his father was having an affair with Jennifer Tilly. Junior's act of patricide allowed Chucky to split his soul into an army of Good Guy dolls. Though he briefly joined Chucky and Tiffany's side, Junior turns against him by refusing to kill Lexy and stabs him to death. However, Chucky manages to stab Junior at the same time and he dies in Lexy's arms. Appears in the TV series.

=== Jason Flemyng ===
(played by Jason Flemyng) - is a character that appeared in the fictional film Chucky Goes Psycho. Appears in Seed of Chucky.

=== James Collins ===
(played by Devon Sawa) - (died November 2023, White House) is the president of the USA. He is killed when Chucky pulls his eyes off. Appears in the TV series.

== K ==
=== Karen Barclay ===
(played by Catherine Hicks) - Andy's mother, and later Mike's wife. She buys him a Good Guy doll for his birthday unaware that the one she picked was possessed by a serial killer. Initially, she refuses to believe that Chucky was alive, but she soon finds out when he comes alive and tries to kill her. In Child's Play 2, she is written out of the story when she was taken away to an insane asylum when no one believes her about the murderous doll. She appears only in the first film and is mentioned in the second, third, and sixth films. In the sixth film, Karen talks to Andy over the phone which reveals that she is now free from the asylum and plans to cook dinner for Andy's upcoming birthday. It is also strongly hinted that she has married Mike.

=== Detective Kim Evans ===
(played by Rachelle Casseus) - Devon's mother and a police detective who begins to suspect Jake after a string of murders committed by Chucky point back to him. She died in episode 6 after a fall from a staircase that broke her neck, because of Chucky. Appears in the TV series.

=== Kristen De Silva ===
(played by Perrey Reeves) - Andy's girlfriend at the military school he attends, ends up sticking up for him when Shelton and the other guys take a liking to bully him. Appears in Child's Play 3.

=== Kyle ===
(played by Christine Elise) - Andy's teenage foster sister whom he ends up staying with. At first, she finds Andy to be a pain on her side, but starts to back up his story about Chucky when she witnesses him trying to take his soul and later finds their foster mother murdered by Chucky. She then goes to find Andy and ends up saving his life in the Play Pals factory, as well as helping him destroy Chucky after he tries to kill him after the voodoo soul transfer spell goes awry. She was briefly mentioned in the third film when Andy re-encounters Chucky again and is shown to have kept in contact with Andy in Curse of Chucky as he kept a photo of her. She returns to the post-credits scene of Cult of Chucky and the television series, Chucky.

== L ==
=== Larry ===
(played voiced by Edan Gross) - Larry is the Good Guy doll that Appears in Child's Play 3.

=== Dr. Lawrence Ardmore ===
Appeared in Child's Play (1988 film) (played by Jack Colvin) - Andy Barclay's psychiatrist. Andy was placed in his care. Chucky sneaks into the asylum that holds Andy and kills him in pursuit. Dr. Ardmore was killed with an electric shock to the head.

=== Lucas Wheeler ===
(portrayed by Devon Sawa) Lucas Wheeler is Jake's homophobic and abusive father. He is a mechanic who turned to alcoholism after his wife's death and disapproves of Jake's desire to be an artist since his mother failed to make a career out of it. After smashing Jake's art piece in a fit of rage, he is killed by Chucky who electrocutes him using his own house's circuit box and whiskey.

He returns in the season 3 finale when Jake temporarily enters the spirit realm to stop Chucky's ghost. Though he initially attacks his son, the two make amends when Jake forgives him.

=== Alexandra "Lexy" Cross ===
(played by Alyvia Alyn Lind) - Jake's enemy turned friend, the elder daughter of Michelle and Nathan Cross, and Junior's girlfriend until episode 6 when he broke up with her. She becomes a target of Chucky for bullying Jake. First by creating a fake GoFundMe page to humiliate him, then by dressing as his recently deceased father for Halloween as payback for embarrassing her during the school talent school, which was actually Chucky pretending to be controlled by Jake. Chucky tries to get Jake to kill her, who refuses in the end and the two join forces to stop Chucky. It is later revealed Chucky was using Jake to complete a voodoo spell by corrupting an innocent child to commit murder, which he eventually succeeds with Junior.

In season 2, Lexy is stuck in a drug-fueled depression due to the deaths of Junior, her father and her mother's mistreatment. She ends up being sent to Lord Incarnate alongside Jake and Devon after Chucky frames them for the death of Jake's foster brother. While she is initially cold to her roommate Nadine, the two bond over their experiences. After Nadine is killed by Chucky, Lexy attempts to overdose but is convinced to continue living by Nadine's angel. Lexy eventually enters rehab and overcomes her addiction at the end of the season. However, she is dealt another blow when Chucky brutally murders her mother while her little sister Caroline betrays her and leaves with Tiffany.

At the start of season 3, Lexy is using social media in order to locate Chucky and her missing sister. When they discover Chucky in the possession of the president's youngest son Henry, she reaches out to his older brother Grant to get inside the White House. Despite feigning interest in him at first, Lexy develops genuine feelings for Grant and reveals her true intentions.

== M ==
=== Michelle Cross ===
Caroline's and Lexy's mom and mayor of the Hackensack. She was murdered by Chucky-Prime. Appears in the TV series.

=== Maggie Peterson ===
(played by Dinah Manoff) - Karen Barclay's best friend who Andy Barclay calls "Aunt Maggie". She was present when Karen purchased Chucky from the peddler and was also Chucky's first victim in the original film. She was struck in the head with a hammer and fell out a window to her death while babysitting Andy. Appears in Child's Play and archive footage in Cult of Chucky.

=== Mattson ===
Appeared in Child's Play 2

(played by Greg Germann) - An executive who works at Play Pals, Inc. He updated the company's CEO Christopher Sullivan about the negative publicity surrounding the company regarding "Chucky" spurred by Andy Barclay's claim that his Good Guy doll was possessed by the soul of serial killer Charles Lee Ray. He informed Christopher Sullivan that Andy is in the foster care system and that his mother Karen Barclay who supported her son's claim is being held in a psychiatric institution. He also revealed that the police did not back up Andy and Karen's claims. Mattson then tells Christopher Sullivan that a detailed report on the doll in question has been completed and that the company found nothing wrong with the doll. As Mattson handed over the report to Christopher Sullivan, he tells him that the company still has the doll in question and allowed him to enter a room so that he could see the doll. While Mattson and Christopher Sullivan watch a toy manufacturer complete the restoration process they witness him hit the jammed machine with his hand which results in his electrocution. Before Christopher Sullivan leaves, he tells Mattson to cover up the toy manufacturer's death and leaves the doll in Mattson's care.

Later that night after work Mattson tosses Chucky into the back seat of his car. He then uses his car phone to call his girlfriend, Gabrielle, who inadvertently reminds Mattson to purchase some vodka. While Mattson is in the liquor store, Chucky looks through Andy's files and calls the orphanage claiming to be Andy's uncle to gain information about Andy's current residence. When Mattson returns to his car, Chucky threatens him with a water pistol. Initially, Mattson did not know that it was Chucky and that the gun was fake. He makes Mattson drive past the Simpson residence and then instructs him to park his car in a vacant parking lot. Once Mattson parks the car, Chucky commands him to put his arms behind the seat and Mattson complies. Chucky ties his arms up with a jump rope. After much pleading and begging to be left alone, Chucky shoots him, and water streams down Mattson's face. Mattson eventually looks in the rearview mirror and realizes that it has been Chucky all along. But before Mattson can react, Chucky places a Play Pals Toy Company plastic bag with a Good Guys logo over Mattson's head and suffocates him. It is never revealed who discovers Mattson's dead body and what kind of consequences if any it had on the Play Pals Toy Company.

- In a deleted scene Mattson calls his wife and lies to her about being stuck late at work. After he hangs up his car phone he then picks it up again and calls his girlfriend Gabrielle.
- Mattson is a character in the 1992 Child's Play 2 comic book produced by Innovation.

=== Detective Mike Norris ===
(played by Chris Sarandon) - A detective investigating the murder of Andy's babysitter. He is also responsible for Chucky's death prompting him to transfer his soul into a Good Guy doll. He initially refuses to believe Barclays, but when Chucky tries to kill him, he becomes an ally to the family. He appears only in the first film and is indirectly mentioned in the second and fourth films. He appears via archive footage in Curse of Chucky, in which it turns out that he and Karen eventually started a relationship and married.

=== Madeleine ===
(played by Elisabeth Rosen) - is a patient at the Harrogate mental facility. She came to the institution after smothering her baby Joshua to death. Appears in Cult of Chucky.

=== Malcolm ===
(played by Adam Hurtig) - is a patient at the Harrogate mental facility, and is called Multiple Malcolm by the other patients. He has Dissociative Identity Disorder and has two notable identities: Michael Phelps and Mark Zuckerberg. Appears in Cult of Chucky.

=== Martha Stewart ===
(played by Martha Stewart) - is a self-reference business magnate, writer, and television personality. Appears in Seed of Chucky, as Tiffany's domestic idol.

== N ==
=== Nadine ===
(played by Bella Higginbotham) - Lexy's kleptomaniac roommate at Lord Incarnate and friend. She helps the trio brainwash Chucky and grows attached to the resulting "Good Chucky". This trust proves to be her undoing when Chucky's evil resurfaces and pushes her off a tower to her death. She reappears as an angelic being in Lexy's drug-induced hallucination and comforts her. Appears in the TV series.

=== Nathan Cross ===
(played by Michael Therriault) - the husband of Michelle Cross and the father of Lexy and Caroline. Appears in the TV series. Therriault previously portrayed Dr. Foley in Cult of Chucky.

=== Nica Pierce ===
(played by Fiona Dourif) - the heroine of the sixth film. Reliant on a wheelchair since birth, Nica's family is slaughtered by Chucky. It is then revealed that Chucky is responsible for Nica's disability. She is blamed for Chucky's murders and sentenced to an asylum for the criminally insane. Appears in Curse of Chucky, Cult of Chucky, and the Chucky television series.

=== Officer "Needlenose" Norton ===
(played by Michael Louis Johnson) - is a corrupt police officer for the Lockport PD, working under Warren Kincaid. Appears in Bride of Chucky.

== O ==
=== Oscar ===
(played voiced by Edan Gross) - Oscar is the Good Guy doll that Appears in Child's Play (1988 film).

== P ==
=== Pete Peters ===
(played by John Waters) - A paparazzi who spies on Jennifer Tilly. Pete is pursued by Chucky after he has seen too much. He is accidentally killed by Glen when a container of acid falls from a shelf and melts his face. Appears in Seed of Chucky.

=== Peter Ray ===
Chucky's dad who was murdered by the Hackensack Slasher in 1965. Appears in the TV series.

=== Phil Simpson ===
(played by Gerrit Graham) - Andy's foster father. Chucky arrives at his house in pursuit of Andy and kills Phil by tripping him on the cellar stairs and snapping his neck. Appears in Child's Play 2.

=== Lieutenant Preston ===
(played by Lawrence Dane) - authority figure in charge of the murder investigation and manhunt for Chucky's murders. He initially suspects Jesse and Jade but clears them of all charges after seeing Chucky walking and talking at a graveyard. Later, while inspecting Tiffany's body, he is bitten in the jugular by a newborn Glen. His fate remains unknown as the screen cuts to black and the credits roll. Appears in Bride of Chucky.

=== Psychs ===
(played by Keith-Lee Castle) - is a British ventriloquist, who ended up as the owner of Glen for six years. Appears in Seed of Chucky.

=== Peddler ===
(played by Juan Ramirez) - is a homeless man, who sells items that he collects in his shopping cart. Appears in Child's Play (1988 film).

== R ==
=== Redman ===
(played by Redman) - a fictionalized version of Redman, acting as a director. Redman intends to sexually coerce Jennifer Tilly into getting a part in his new film. Tiffany kills him by disembowelment. Appears in Seed of Chucky.

=== Officer Robert Bailey ===
(played by Vince Corazza) - A corrupt cop who meets with Tiffany to sell her Chucky's remains. Tiffany kills him by slashing his throat with a nail file. Appears in Bride of Chucky and is mentioned by Tiffany in Seed of Chucky.

=== Ronald Tyler ===
(played by Jeremy Sylvers) - A young private boy who befriends Andy at the military school he is sent to after failing to cope with living at several foster homes. When he finds Chucky (who mailed himself to the same military school to go after Andy again), he decides to go after Tyler instead. At first, Tyler finds Chucky to be a nice guy but realizes the true colors of the doll's evil murderous ways once he attempts to transfer his soul into his body much like he attempted to do with Andy in the first two films. Appears in Child’s Play 3.

=== Russ ===
(played by James Gallanders) - is part of a con artist couple, with his wife Diane. Appears in Bride of Chucky.

=== Rachel ===
(played by Allison Dawn Doiron) - is a woman who briefly dated Andy Barclay before discovering his tortured Chucky head. Appears in Cult of Chucky.

=== Rachel Fairchild ===
Jake's biology teacher who was trio's legal guardian and helped them defeat Chucky and was killed by him. Appears in the TV series.

=== Rick Spires ===
(played by Adam Ryen) - is a school bully Andy encounters at school who appears in Child's Play 2. Before Andy boards the school bus, Kyle warns him to pretend that he belongs in school, knowing that the students at the elementary school Andy is going to like to pick on new students. As he boards the bus, Andy ignores the other children who are chatting and throwing paper balls at each other. As he passes by Rick Spires in the second to last seat, as Kyle had predicted, Rick easily knows that Andy is a new student and pushes him rudely, even though Andy didn't have any intention of sitting next to him. Andy, at first, brushes off the incident and sits way in the back of the school bus. Later on, during the final class period of the day, as Ms. Kettlewell is reading the story of Pinocchio to the class for story time, Rick (who happens to be in the same class as Andy) takes advantage of the fact that Andy and the other students are too busy paying attention to the story and deliberately flicks Andy in the back of the head, which makes Andy turn around and shout "Get lost, microchip!" at Rick (hinting that Rick has been picking on him all day and Andy has just about had enough of it). When Ms. Kettlewell hears this, she first suspects Andy's disturbance as a way of saying that she's boring him (though he reassures her she isn't) and warns Andy that she doesn't tolerate disruptive students. Andy tries to vouch that the disturbance was Rick's fault while Rick just acts like nothing happened, but Ms. Kettlewell warns Andy that as a new student, he should worry more about staying on her good side, thus allowing Rick to get away with his troublemaking. When the school bell rings for the end of the final class period of the day, Rick cleans up his desk, according to one of Ms. Kettlewell's classroom rules. Afterwards, when the bell rings for student dismissal, he leaves to go home and study for the following day's spelling test along with the other students minus Andy, who was being forced by Ms. Kettlewell to stay after school for detention for writing obscenity on his test paper (which was really Chucky's doing).

Rick Spires' name wasn't mentioned within the movie as neither Andy nor Ms. Kettlewell addressed him by his real name minus Andy's insult to him, but the name was revealed during the end credits.

== S ==
=== Sarah Pierce ===
(played by Chantal Quesnel) Nica's mom and Chucky's original love interest. Sarah's husband was killed by Chucky in 1988 when he was still a human. Sarah is kidnapped by Chucky and she reports him to the police, eventually leading to the events of the original film. Chucky kills her 25 years later by stabbing her with scissors. Appears in Curse of Chucky.

=== Stan ===
(played by Steve Lawton) - Jennifer Tilly's chauffeur. Stan is in love with Jennifer and sacrifices himself to protect her. He is killed by Chucky with a knife through the chest. Appears in Seed of Chucky.

=== Officer Keith Stanton ===
(played by Adam Hurtig) - A corrupt police officer. After finding Father Frank died in a car accident, Stanton investigates Frank's death. Stanton arrives at the Pierce residence, only to find Barb's corpse, and incorrectly concludes Nica was the culprit. Stanton is later murdered in his car by Tiffany. Appears in Curse of Chucky.

=== Sammy ===
(played by Adam Wylie) - a child who was at the Children's Crisis Center with Grace Poole. Appears in Child's Play 2.

== T ==
=== Tiffany Valentine ===
(played by Jennifer Tilly) - Charles Lee Ray's former girlfriend (and later wife) who later gets her soul stuck in a doll-like Chucky. She ultimately transfers her soul into actress Jennifer Tilly (her doppelganger and portrayer) after being fed up with her husband's intent to remain a doll. In Curse, she is shown to be living a double life as both her regular self and Tilly. Between Curse and Cult, Tiffany becomes Alice Pierce's legal guardian until her death. Tiffany then returns to her role as Chucky's accomplice. Appears in Bride, Seed, Curse, Cult, and the Chucky television series.

=== Tommy ===
(played voiced by Edan Gross) - Tommy is the Good Guy doll in the Simpsons' household. Appears in Child's Play 2. Another Tommy doll appears in the series, as a gift from Nathan Cross to his youngest daughter, Caroline, after Chucky was burned.

=== Tony Gardner ===
(played by Tony Gardner) - is a self-referential puppeteer for the fictional Chucky Goes Psycho film. He is a deckhand and the first victim in the film. Appears in Seed of Chucky.

== V ==
=== Vivian Van Pelt ===
Vivian Van Pelt is a victim of Charles Lee Ray during the Lakeshore Strangler years of the 1980s. Mentioned in Bride of Chucky.

- She is possibly indirectly mentioned by Grace Poole in Child's Play 2 when she quotes, "He (Charles Lee Ray) murdered a dozen people".
- Vivian is one of two female victims of Charles Lee Ray, with the other being Tiffany's mother, whom he (as a doll) had revealed to have been murdered by him 20 years before Seed of Chucky.

== W ==
=== Chief Warren Kincaid ===
(played by John Ritter) - Jade's uncle. Warren is the corrupt chief of police and uses his power to keep Jesse away and keep Jade in line. He is attacked by Chucky and Tiffany with a bed of nails and killed by several stab wounds to the back. Appears in Bride of Chucky.

=== Warren Pryce ===
(played by Gil Bellows) - A CIA agent, who vehemently opposes President James Collins' platform of transparency and refuses to allow the exposure of government secrets. He is burned alive after Grant locks him inside the burning Oval Office. Appears in the TV series.

=== Walter Criswell ===
(played by Alan Wilder) - is the manager of the department store where Maggie and Karen work at. Appears in Child's Play (1988 film).

== Characters exclusive to the 2019 film ==
=== Andy Barclay ===
(played by Gabriel Bateman) - He is a pre-teen boy with hearing loss who receives a Kaslan-brand Buddi doll from his mother Karen. However, both are unaware that the doll's artificial intelligence had been tampered with by a disgruntled employee. Andy becomes attached to the doll, who calls itself "Chucky," and soon after befriends local kids Pugg and Fayln.

=== Chucky ===
(voiced by Mark Hamill) - an artificially-intelligent Buddi doll that has its safety precautions disabled by a disgruntled Kaslan Industries employee during the assembly process. As a result, Chucky gradually develops murderous tendencies as he tries to maintain his bond with his owner and "best friend", Andy.

=== Chris ===
(played by Anantjot S. Aneja) - One of Andy's new friends.

=== Chien ===
(played by Phoenix Ly) - is the fired Kaslan employee who maliciously reprograms the Buddi doll that becomes Chucky.

=== Doreen Norris ===
(played by Carlease Burke) - The mother of Mike Norris in the 2019 film. Chucky causes the Kaslan Car where she is traveling to crash, before stabbing her.

=== Falyn ===
(played by Beatrice Kitsos) - One of Andy's new friends.

=== Gabe ===
(portrayed by Trent Redekop) - A perverse, building voyeur and electrician of the apartment who takes Chucky to the basement to prepare him for sale online. Chucky, repaired, torments Gabe before mutilating him with a table saw.

=== Henry Kaslan ===
(played by Tim Matheson) - The founder and CEO OF Kaslan Corp, the company that manufactures the Buddi dolls. After the incident of Chucky's killing spree in Zed-Mart, Kaslan provides a disclaimer regarding Chucky's programming and the recalling of Buddi and Buddi 2.

=== Karen Barclay ===
(played by Aubrey Plaza) - Karen is a single mother to her son, Andy. She works in the customer service department at Zed-Mart. She gives Andy a malfunctioning Buddi doll named Chucky and starts becoming suspicious when Chucky begins committing murders, not believing Andy when he says Chucky did it. She realizes the truth after Chucky holds her hostage at Zed-Mart and tries killing her by tying her neck to a forklift, but Andy manages to cut her down using Chucky's knife and they defeat Chucky.

=== Mike Norris ===
(played by Brian Tyree Henry) - A detective who helps Karen and Andy to defeat Chucky.

=== Omar ===
(played by Marlon Kazadi) - A neighbor of Andy and one of his new friends.

=== Pugg ===
(played by Ty Consiglio) - One of Andy's new friends.

=== Shane ===
(played by David Lewis) - A married boyfriend of Karen who is abusive towards Andy because of his deafness. It is revealed that Shane already has a family and he's been having an affair with Karen behind his wife's back. When he's taking down Christmas lights, Chucky frightens him into falling from the ladder and breaking both of his legs. Then he activates a tiller which runs into Shane's head, killing him. By the following day, Chucky has delivered Shane's skinned face as a gift to Andy.

=== Wes ===
(played by Amro Majzoub) - is Karen's boss at Zed-Mart.

=== Detective Willis ===
(played by Nicole Anthony) - is a member of the Chicago Police Department and partner to Mike Norris.
