= Chucky season 1 =

American horror television series

Chucky
- Season 1
- Promotional poster
- Showrunner: Don Mancini
- Starring: Zackary Arthur; Björgvin Arnarson; Alyvia Alyn Lind; Teo Briones; Brad Dourif
- No. of episodes: 8

Release
- Original network: Syfy; USA Network
- Original release: October 12 – November 30, 2021

Season chronology
- Next → Season 2

The first season of the American horror series Chucky, created by Don Mancini, premiered on Syfy and USA Network on October 12, 2021, and concluded on November 30, 2021. The season consists of 8 episodes. The series is based on the Child's Play film franchise.

The series serves as a sequel to Cult of Chucky, and stars Brad Dourif reprising his role as the voice of the titular character, alongside Zackary Arthur, Teo Briones, Alyvia Alyn Lind, and Björgvin Arnarson. The season received generally positive reviews from critics, resulting in a renewal for a second season in November 2021.

== Cast and characters ==
=== Main ===
- Zackary Arthur as Jake Wheeler
- Björgvin Arnarson as Devon Evans
- Alyvia Alyn Lind as Alexandra "Lexy" Cross
- Teo Briones as Junior Wheeler
- Brad Dourif as the voice of Chucky / Charles Lee Ray
  - Jacob Breedon as Chucky (in-suit performer)
  - David Kohlsmith as young Charles Lee Ray (7 years old)
  - Tyler Barish as young Charles Lee Ray (14 years old)
  - Fiona Dourif as Charles Lee Ray in the 1980s (non-speaking)

=== Recurring ===
- Devon Sawa as Logan Wheeler
  - Sawa also portrays Lucas Wheeler
- Lexa Doig as Bree Wheeler
- Barbara Alyn Woods as Mayor Michelle Cross
- Michael Therriault as Nathan Cross
- Carina London Battrick as Caroline Cross
- Rachelle Casseus as Detective Kim Evans
- Fiona Dourif as Nica Pierce
  - Dourif also portrays Chucky
- Jennifer Tilly as Tiffany Valentine
  - Blaise Crocker as young Tiffany Valentine
  - Tilly also voices her doll form that originated in Bride of Chucky.
- Christine Elise as Kyle
- Alex Vincent as Andy Barclay
- Annie M. Briggs as Rachel Fairchild
- Rosemary Dunsmore as Dr. Amanda Mixter

== Episodes ==
No. overall	No. in season	Title	Directed by	Written by	Original release date	U.S. viewers (millions)
1	1	"Death by Misadventure"	Don Mancini	Don Mancini	October 12, 2021	0.457 (SY); 0.358 (USN)
In Hackensack, New Jersey, 14-year-old Jake Wheeler purchases Chucky, a vintage Good Guy doll, in a yard sale to use him in his personal contemporary art project. Jake's father, Lucas, disapproves of this hobby and eventually destroys the project. The next day at school, Jake is bullied by Lexy Cross, his cousin Junior's girlfriend. At night, Andy Barclay calls Jake and suggests caution with Chucky. Jake, however, throws Chucky away. Chucky tracks Jake down to the school talent show and forces him to fake an act of ventriloquism. During the show, Chucky humiliates Lexy, and Jake is subsequently suspended from school. Lucas later hits Jake after an argument over his sexuality; Chucky then murders Lucas. Jake is taken to live with Logan and Bree, Junior's parents. Chucky eventually proposes the prospect of killing Lexy too after saying that Lucas deserved to die for being abusive towards Jake. Flashbacks: In 1965, Charles Lee Ray is sitting with his mother. They are looking at the mirror happily.
2	2	"Give Me Something Good to Eat"	Dermott Downs	Harley Peyton & Don Mancini	October 19, 2021	0.390 (SY); 0.280 (USN)
Jake returns to school after his father's death, where he's invited to his classmate Oliver's Halloween party. While everyone is out, Chucky murders the Wheelers' maid. Jake confronts Chucky, who feigns innocence, and tries to convince Jake that he is on his side. That night, Junior and Jake overhear Logan and Bree discussing if they are even capable of looking after Jake, and Junior begins to fear Jake is capable of hurting Lexy. On the night of the Halloween party, Lexy is told to take her sister Caroline - who has begun to fixate on Chucky since seeing him in the talent show - trick-or-treating - but takes her to the party instead. Jake decides to stay home until he finds Chucky missing and races to the party. There, he finds Lexy dressed up as his father, mocking his death. Despite his rage, Jake stops Chucky from killing her. That night, Chucky once again tries to convince Jake to become a killer. Flashbacks: In 1965, Charles Lee Ray returns home from trick-or-treating. Inspecting his candy, he finds an apple with a razor blade in it, but eats it anyway, uncaring as he cuts his mouth.
3	3	"I Like to Be Hugged"	Dermott Downs	Nick Zigler & Sarah Acosta	October 26, 2021	0.330 (SY); 0.352 (USN)
Chucky persuades Jake to give in to his temptation to kill Lexy, remembering his encounter with a serial killer in 1965. Jake attempts to murder Lexy in the woods, only to encounter Junior, who later tells Lexy to apologize to Jake, worrying about what Jake is capable of. Because of this and Caroline's outburst of wanting Chucky, Lexy apologizes to Jake in hopes of having Chucky calm her sister down. After Chucky decides to kill Lexy himself, Jake accepts her apology and seemingly gives him up. Meanwhile, Logan and Bree are called into a meeting alongside Lexy's parents, Hackensack's mayor Michelle Cross and her husband Nathan. Meanwhile, Lexy hosts a secret rave party. There, Junior and Oliver compete for Lexy. Chucky accidentally stabs Oliver when he mistakes him for Lexy and murders him without the partygoers noticing anything. Chucky then corners Lexy in a room, causing a fire that engulfs the house as Jake visits his parents' graves. Flashbacks: In 1965, a young Charles Lee Ray helps the serial killer murder his parents.
4	4	"Just Let Go"	Leslie Libman	Mallory Westfall & Kim Garland	November 2, 2021	0.282 (SY); 0.302 (USN)
Caroline ends in the ICU. Lexy and Jake decide to investigate Lexy's burned house for Chucky. Meanwhile, Junior undergoes a medical procedure, and classmate Devon Evans researches the urban legend about how Charles Lee Ray turned into a doll. Despite Chucky's attempts to convince him to let Lexy die, Jake saves her life. Detective Peyton later takes them and Chucky to the hospital. There, Jake is stopped by Devon's mother, Detective Kim Evans, who believes that he is behind the murders. Meanwhile, Chucky murders the officer who found him. Devon finds Lexy and reveals the truth about Chucky. As Jake is being interrogated, Chucky unplugs Caroline's monitor, causing chaos in her hospital room. The officer's body is found, and Jake, Lexy, and Devon watch as Chucky flips them off from a distance. Flashbacks: In 1972, a teenage Charles Lee Ray lives at a foster boarding home with other children, including one named Eddie Caputo. Charles kills a janitor and scares other children when they see his body in a forest. Eventually, Charles leaves the home and bids farewell to Caputo, leaving him a present in a box: the janitor's severed hand.
5	5	"Little Little Lies"	Leslie Libman	Harley Peyton & Rachael Paradis	November 9, 2021	0.252 (SY); 0.265 (USN)
When the Cross family returns home, Nathan gives Caroline a Good Guy doll named Tommy, in replacement for the burnt-up Chucky. Jake, Devon, and Lexy ambush the burnt Chucky in a trash can. They kick Chucky until believing that he is dead. Jake and Devon eventually have their first kiss. Meanwhile, Tiffany Valentine and a possessed Nica Pierce live in a Hackensack hotel with two victims, one who is already dead, held hostage. Under Chucky's spell, Nica slashes the surviving hostage's neck. Bree received stage 4 cancer diagnosis but hides it from her family. Michelle and Kim hold a town meeting at the school, announcing new city rules. The school principal's severed head then rolls onto the stage. Chucky is alive, having transferred his soul into the Tommy doll. Flashbacks: In the 1980s, a young adult Charles Lee Ray is in a dance club and meets an exotic dancer with whom he flirts. He takes both the dancer and a red-headed woman to a hotel. There, the two women put on a show until Charles kills the dancer much to the joy of both him and the other woman, who turns out to be a young Tiffany.
6	6	"Cape Queer"	Samir Rehem	Nick Zigler & Sarah Acosta	November 16, 2021	0.378 (SY); 0.278 (USN)
After the events of Cult of Chucky, Andy and his foster sister Kyle have begun to hunt down the remaining Chucky dolls. Mrs. Fairchild, the biology teacher of Jake, Devon, and Lexy, is arrested and charged for the deaths of Oliver and the principal; with no other option, Jake and Devon contact Andy and Kyle. Meanwhile, Nica reverts to her original body and feigns Chucky in Tiffany's presence. However, Tiffany discovers the ruse and reveals that she has purchased Chucky's childhood home before knocking Nica out and tying her up inside the house. Bree comes clean about her cancer diagnosis to her family; during a meeting with her therapist, Chucky pushes a cart toward Bree and throws her out the glass window, killing her. Bree's therapist attributes it to depression and labels it as suicide. Devon reveals his relationship with Jake to his mother; Jake, Devon, and Lexy later set up a trap for Chucky, who attacks them and murders Kim by breaking her neck when she falls down the stairs. Flashbacks: In 1987, Charles Lee Ray and Tiffany purchase a car and kill the salesman. While they drive, Charles reads a book about Voodoo.
7	7	"Twice the Grieving, Double the Loss"	Samir Rehem	Mallory Westfall & Isabella Gutierrez	November 23, 2021	0.350 (SY); 0.348 (USN)
At Bree's wake, Junior blames Jake for the recent deaths. Tiffany shows up unannounced and kisses Logan. Andy abandons Kyle at a gas station and heads to Hackensack on his own. Devon prepares to leave the town and live with his aunt, following Kim's death. At a public conference, Michelle announces that the annual town screening of Frankenstein will have a celebrity guest of Jennifer Tilly, with Tiffany posing as her. Chucky acquaints Junior and convinces him to kill those he believes is responsible for his family falling apart. Jake buys a suspicious Good Guy doll and brings it to Lexy's house. Both kids later realize that Devon has broken into Chucky's childhood home. Meanwhile, Chucky, who has regained power over Nica's body, takes Devon hostage. Chucky convinces Junior that Logan cheated on Bree with Tiffany, somehow causing her "suicide," and proceeds to beat Logan to death with the doll. Andy arrives at the Wheeler's house, and Devon is revealed to be surrounded by Good Guy dolls. Flashbacks: In 1988, Tiffany discovers that Charles kills behind her back. The two have an argument before he storms out.
8	8	"An Affair to Dismember"	Jeff Renfroe	Don Mancini & Harley Peyton	November 30, 2021	0.296 (SY); 0.313 (USN)
The doll Jake bought comes alive, but is killed by Kyle, who reveals Chucky's voodoo abilities before drugging Jake and Lexy to keep them safe. When Tiffany arrives home, Chucky, as Nica, attempts to kill her, but Chucky and Junior arrive to handle the situation. Tiffany shows Chucky his horde of Good Guys dolls to fulfill his plan: the dolls will be distributed in a delivery truck to murder people all over the country. When Tiffany accuses Chucky of being self-centered, Chucky tells Junior to kill Nica, but Tiffany, fed up with Chucky's abusive treatment of her, decapitates the doll before he can. Tiffany detonates a bomb in the basement, which seemingly kills Andy and Kyle. At the screening, Chucky begins stabbing and killing guests, including Nathan. Lexy convinces Junior to do the right thing, so he stabs Chucky before being stabbed himself. Jake then crushes Chucky's head. Junior apologizes before dying in Lexy's arms. Lexy then tells Jake and Devon about Junior's death. Andy, who survived the explosion, hijacks the truck and foils Chucky's plan, but Tiffany's doll form reveals herself and takes him hostage with a gun. The following day, Tiffany reveals that she has cut off Nica's limbs in fear of what Chucky would do if he takes over Nica's body again. At the Wheeler family's graves, a gloved hand later appears. Flashbacks: In 1988, as Charles leaves his apartment, Tiffany calls Detective Mike Norris to report the "Lakeshore Strangler".

=== Promotion and broadcast ===
The first season of Chucky premiered simultaneously on Syfy and the USA Network on October 12, 2021. Prior to the premiere, both channels released several promotional posters and videos, including one where Chucky reenacts the trailer for the 1978 film Magic with his classic voodoo chant to Damballa. In June, Syfy presented the "Pride of Chucky" marathon, consisting of six of the seven films from Child's Play franchise, in celebration of the LGBTQ+ pride month. On October 8, Don Mancini, Zackary Arthur, Jennifer Tilly and Alex Vincent attended the New York Comic Con, where a "Good Guys" branded ice cream truck was displayed. A screening of the first episode was also held at the same event.

== Reception ==
=== Critical response ===
On Rotten Tomatoes, the first season holds an approval rating of 94% based on 35 critic reviews, with an average rating of 7/10. The website's critical consensus reads, "A bloody good time that benefits greatly from Brad Dourif's return, Chucky may not play well for non-fans, but franchise devotees will find its absurd humor and creative horror very much intact on the small screen." Metacritic gave the series a weighted average score of 70 out of 100 based on 12 critic reviews, indicating "generally favorable" reviews.

=== Ratings ===
==== Syfy ====
Viewership and ratings per episode of Chucky season 1
No.	Title	Air date	Rating (18–49)	Viewers (millions)	DVR (18–49)	DVR viewers (millions)	Total (18–49)	Total viewers (millions)
1	"Death by Misadventure"	October 12, 2021	0.2	0.457	0.1	0.201	0.3	0.658
2	"Give Me Something Good to Eat"	October 19, 2021	0.1	0.390	0.2	0.385	0.3	0.705
3	"I Like to Be Hugged"	October 26, 2021	0.2	0.330	TBD	TBD	TBD	TBD
4	"Just Let Go"	November 2, 2021	0.1	0.282	TBD	TBD	TBD	TBD
5	"Little Little Lies"	November 9, 2021	0.1	0.252	TBD	TBD	TBD	TBD
6	"Cape Queer"	November 16, 2021	0.1	0.378	0.1	0.361	0.3	0.739
7	"Twice the Grieving, Double the Loss"	November 23, 2021	0.1	0.350	0.1	0.255	0.2	0.605
8	"An Affair to Dismember"	November 30, 2021	0.1	0.296	0.1	0.349	0.3	0.645

==== USA Network ====
Viewership and ratings per episode of Chucky season 1
No.	Title	Air date	Rating (18–49)	Viewers (millions)	DVR (18–49)	DVR viewers (millions)	Total (18–49)	Total viewers (millions)
1	"Death by Misadventure"	October 12, 2021	0.1	0.358	0.1	0.301	0.2	0.659
2	"Give Me Something Good to Eat"	October 19, 2021	0.1	0.280	0.1	0.219	0.2	0.499
3	"I Like to Be Hugged"	October 26, 2021	0.1	0.352	TBD	TBD	TBD	TBD
4	"Just Let Go"	November 2, 2021	0.1	0.302	TBD	TBD	TBD	TBD
5	"Little Little Lies"	November 9, 2021	0.1	0.265	TBD	TBD	TBD	TBD
6	"Cape Queer"	November 16, 2021	0.1	0.278	0.1	0.219	0.2	0.497
7	"Twice the Grieving, Double the Loss"	November 23, 2021	0.1	0.348	0.1	0.167	0.2	0.515
8	"An Affair to Dismember"	November 30, 2021	0.1	0.313	0.1	0.244	0.2	0.557
