= Death by misadventure (disambiguation) =

In British law, a death by misadventure is an accidental death as a result of a voluntary risk taken by the victim

Death by misadventure can also refer to:

- A song from Ted Nugent's album Cat Scratch Fever (1977)
- A song from John Hiatt's album Riding With the King (1983).
- The first episode of the first season of the television series Chucky.
