= Jake Wheeler =

Fictional character in the Child's Play franchise

- Child's Play character
- Zackary Arthur as Jake Wheeler in Chucky season two.
- First appearance: "Death by Misadventure" (2021)
- Created by: Don Mancini
- Portrayed by: Zackary Arthur

In-universe information
- Gender: Male
- Occupation: High school student (formerly)
- Affiliation: Chucky (formerly)
- Family: Mary Wheeler (mother; deceased); Lucas Wheeler (father; deceased); Junior Wheeler (cousin; deceased); Logan Wheeler (uncle; deceased); Bree Wheeler (aunt; deceased); Larry (former adoptive father); Pam (former adoptive mother); Gary (adoptive brother; deceased); Rachel Fairchild (guardian; deceased)
- Significant others: Devon Evans (boyfriend)
- Origin: Hackensack, New Jersey, United States
- Status: Alive
- Allies: Devon Evans; Lexy Cross; Andy Barclay; Kyle; Nica Pierce; Grant Collins; Henry Collins

Jake Wheeler is a fictional character in the Child's Play franchise created by Don Mancini and portrayed by Zackary Arthur. He is the protagonist of the Syfy and USA Network series Chucky, which shares continuity with the original seven Child's Play films. He first appears in "Death by Misadventure", the premiere episode of the show's first season.

In the series, Jake is a bullied teen who finds a vintage Good Guy doll at a neighborhood yard sale, only to discover that it is in fact Chucky, a murderous doll possessed by the spirit of an infamous serial killer. His life is then thrown into chaos as he and his friends attempt to stop Chucky's killing spree.

== Appearances ==
=== Season 1 ===
While shopping at a local yard sale in his hometown of Hackensack, New Jersey, Jake comes across a vintage Good Guy doll and buys it, intending to use its head as part of an art sculpture made of doll parts. He takes the doll home but is interrupted by his father, Lucas, before he can cut off the head and is informed that he will not be able to go to art camp that summer. During a family dinner that evening, Lucas drinks heavily and becomes enraged as a comment made by Jake's cousin Junior over Jake being gay, denying that his son is old enough to know who he is. Lucas subsequently destroys Jake's sculpture with a baseball bat and tells him he can no longer have any dolls, though Jake later finds the Good Guy doll under his bed. Learning they are worth a lot of money, Jake takes the doll to school with him to protect it from his father, leading him to be ridiculed by his classmate Lexy. At lunch, Devon, another classmate, attempts to connect with Jake after discovering he is a fan of Devon's horror themed podcast but an upset Jake brushes him off. Jake chats with a prospective buyer for the doll, who asks whether its name is "Chucky" and whether anything weird has happened with it recently, encouraging Jake to check the back of the doll for batteries. The next morning, Jake is confused to find the doll at his house, as he had left it at school for safekeeping, and finds it has no batteries. Disturbed, he throws the doll in the garbage and attends the school talent show, where he is again singled out by Lexy, who attempts to expose his crush on Devon but is interrupted by a voice coming from the doll. Jake picks up the doll and pretends he is performing a ventriloquist act, though this goes awry when Chucky reveals that he has Lexy's phone and begins reading out her intimate text messages in a profanity-laden speech, causing Jake to be suspended from school. At home, a furious Lucas chastises Jake for having no friends and everyone thinking he is weird. Jake retorts that Lucas is really only upset that people know he is gay and Lucas strikes him in the face. He then furiously pins Jake against the wall, threatening to kill him if he ever says he is gay again. Following this, as Jake sits in his room crying, the lights begin to flicker and he goes down to the basement to see Lucas being electrocuted to death. Being sent to live with his uncle Logan and aunt Bree, Chucky finally reveals himself, stating that Lucas got what he deserved. Chucky then murders Logan and Bree's maid and reasons that he is trying to help Jake, declaring that some people deserve to die, including his bully Lexy.

When Chucky disappears, Jake fears he has gone to a Halloween party hosted by one of his classmates, Oliver, to try and murder Lexy. While there, Lexy dresses as Lucas and mockingly re-enacts his death in front of the crowd. Jake manages to find Chucky before he can stab Lexy and takes him home, not realizing that Chucky has already murdered Oliver upstairs. Chucky attempts to convince Jake that he should kill Lexy himself before she has a chance to humiliate him again. Giving into his dark impulses, Jake takes a knife and stalks Lexy through the woods but aborts the plan after discovering that he has mistakenly been following Junior. Lexy visits Jake the next day to offer a reluctant apology and asks whether she can have Chucky to give to her sister Caroline. Though he initially refuses, Jake drops him off at Lexy's house so he can kill her. That night, Jake visits his parents' graves and laments his struggles while Chucky fails to kill Lexy in a house fire. The next day, she angrily confronts Jake about the doll being alive and Jake states that, as she did not see Chucky die in the fire, he is likely still after her, so they resolve to work together to find him. Lexy asks Jake whether things were so bad between them that he genuinely wanted her to die, and Jake blows up at her, stating that she is a bad person and that she deserved to die. Lexy then falls from a balcony but is caught by Jake. Chucky arrives and tries to convince him to let her go but Jake realises he's not a killer and pulls her to safety. Jake is questioned by Detective Evans, Devon's mother, over the deaths of Oliver and his father but they are interrupted when a police officer is found dead.

After unsuccessfully trying to locate Chucky, Jake, Lexy, and Devon regroup at school and debate telling Junior about Chucky, though Lexy refuses, saying he wouldn't believe them. At a memorial for Oliver, Jake confesses to Devon that he feels responsible for the deaths caused by Chucky, and Devon takes his hand to comfort him. Lexy finds Chucky in her garbage can and the trio destroy the doll by stomping on it. Celebrating their victory, Jake and Devon share their first kiss. Attending a town hall meeting the next night, the school principal's head rolls onto the stage, revealing to the teens that Chucky is still alive. Devon has the idea that they should contact Andy Barclay, the original survivor of Chucky's murders, and Andy tells them Chucky will come after them at a place they are familiar with. The group set a trap for him at Junior's house, with Lexy acting as bait however, their plan is interrupted by the arrival of Detective Evans, who is killed when Chucky lunges at her and causes her to fall down the stairs. Bree is also killed by Chucky when he pushes her out of a window. At her wake, Junior confronts Jake, blaming him for her death, noting that everything was fine until he came to live with them. Jake resolves to leave town but is compelled to return after seeing a delivery man with a Good Guy doll who was planning to deliver it to Charles Lee Ray's childhood home. Jake and Lexy discover that Devon had already gone to the house alone and plot a rescue. They are interrupted by the doll, which comes to life and begins advancing on them, but they are saved by the arrival of Kyle, who shoots it in the head.

Kyle teaches Jake and Lexy that Chucky can split his soul over multiple vessels. Jake tells her they need her help to rescue Devon, who has been taken captive, but Kyle drugs them to keep them safe and promises to save Devon. When they wake up, the discover that Charles' home was destroyed by a homemade bomb and a distraught Jake goes to Devon's room to grieve but is relieved to find out that he survived the explosion. Devon reveals there is a truck of Good Guy dolls heading to the Hackensack theatre, where Chucky and Tiffany plan to give them away to the townsfolk. Arriving at the theatre, they find that Chucky has already murdered several patrons, including Junior and Lexy's father. Jake confronts Chucky, who mocks him, saying that once he kills him, nobody will remember his name, whereas they will all remember Chucky's name. Chucky manages to slash Jake in the leg but Jake eventually gains the upper hand and crushes the doll with his bare hands, killing him once and for all. Finally safe, Jake, Devon and Lexy promise to never tell anyone else about what really happened.

=== Season 2 ===
Jake is subsequently placed in a foster home with his new foster parents Pam and Larry, and his foster brother Gary. Before they leave Hackensack, Jake visits Devon and they discuss the possibility of a long-distance relationship. Though initially reluctant to show affection in front of his new family, Jake gets out of the car and kisses Devon goodbye. Six months later, while preparing to trick or treat with Gary, Jake starts getting threatening phone calls and discovers that Chucky has returned. Devon explains that he has also been receiving calls and the two unsuccessfully attempt to contact Lexy after Chucky reveals that he is inside her house. Jake travels back to Hackensack and reunites with Devon and Lexy, who is suspicious of Belle, Caroline's new doll gifted to her by her therapist. They find Chucky downstairs with Gary and a homemade bomb. Chucky tells them he wanted to kill all three of them in a kamikaze mission as revenge for his murder six months prior. Though they manage to survive, Chucky and Gary are killed. Believing them to have been responsible, the authorities send the trio to a Catholic reformatory school in lieu of juvenile detention.

=== Season 3 ===
Jake begins livestreaming and showcasing his art and doll sculptures. He is working on one final piece in the doll genre, as an exposé to the darkness behind the innocent facades of mass-marketed children's dolls. However, in order to finish this sculpture and finally move on with his life, he requires a Good Guy doll. He admits that he nor anyone else has been able to find one anywhere for over a year, but he has heard a rumour that there is still one out there. He urges his viewers to get in touch with him if they can find this Good Guy doll. The following morning, Jake and Devon attempt to get intimate for the first time, but stop when they both receive texts from an unknown number. The text to Jake asks if he is still looking for a Good Guy doll. Lexy bursts into the room as she got a text as well, and the three question if Chucky is back. Suddenly, Jake gets a call from an untraceable number, which turns out to be from Chucky. When Jake demands to know where Chucky is, he simply taunts them. Later that day, Miss Fairchild has the three of them take an assessment exam to see where they are education-wise, as they had missed quite a bit of schooling. Before they begin the test, Devon questions if they should tell her that Chucky has returned. Jake believes it's too dangerous, as the least they can do is protect her. After they finish the exams, they continue their discussion about Chucky in the living room as Miss Fairchild grades them. Their only clue to Chucky's location is the phone call, which as Devon learned could only be made untraceable by either the CIA or the Pentagon. They then turn their attention to the television, which is airing the news of a Secret Service agent who recently committed suicide. They see a Good Guy doll being carried by the President's son Henry, and come to the conclusion that they must somehow travel to Washington and gain access to the White House, in order to find Caroline and kill Chucky once and for all.

== Creation and development ==
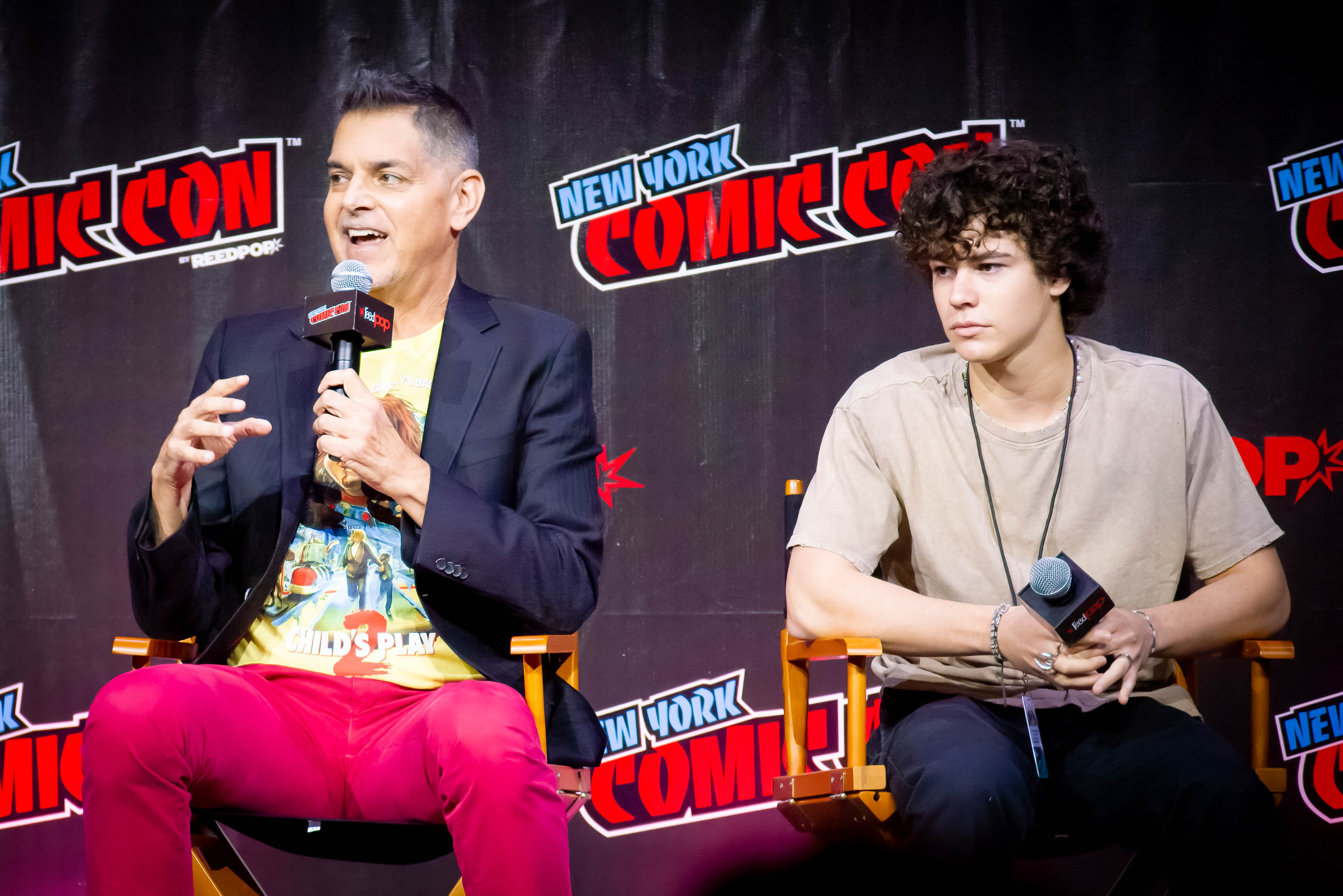
Series creator Don Mancini with Zackary Arthur, who plays Jake, at New York Comic Con. Mancini discussed in several interviews that the character of Jake was based on some of his own experiences as a gay boy.

On January 29, 2019, it was reported that a television series based on the Child's Play franchise was in development on Syfy, with franchise creator Don Mancini serving as the creator and executive producer alongside David Kirschner, Harley Peyton, and Nick Antosca. When developing the show, Mancini expressed a desire to "reinvent" the franchise and expand its audience and took a partially autobiographical approach when creating the character of Jake. He explained that "taking [the franchise] into the medium of TV and having so much more storytelling space at my disposal means so much more opportunity to explore character relationships. I realised that it gave me an opportunity to really be more personal, and even autobiographical than I’ve ever been before. So the character Jake, played by Zach Arthur, there are a lot of autobiographical elements for me in that character". Mancini specifically mentioned how Jake's father not accepting his son's "burgeoning sexual and romantic identity" as a gay boy related to some of his own experiences as a gay boy. He also teased that Chucky would initially take advantage of Jake's struggles as a member of the LGBTQ+ community to try and manipulate him by acknowledging that he has a queer child (Glen/Glenda, from Seed of Chucky), referring to Chucky as "the ultimate bully".

Discussing the development of Jake's relationship with Devon for the show's second season, Mancini explained "I wanted to go further with the love story. I wanted to stress their relationship in the Catholic school setting because that’s something that I experienced as a kid, as a gay teenager who was raised Catholic." Arthur teased that the season would explore whether the couple actually belong together noting, "they were brought together by Chucky and we’re exploring, ‘OK, do these people really match, do these people really get along?’ Chucky brought them together, but do they really have anything in common?" Arthur also discussed Jake's emotional state in the second season and explained that "there’s some trauma and some guilt that Jake carries from the first season that influence some choices that he makes, and things he believes in."

During the third season, Arthur expressed his excitement at Jake and Devon's relationship reaching new levels of intimacy, stating "oh, I think it's a great contrast from season two because the characters were at odds and they didn't really get to spend as much time together as they should have. But in season three, we do get to see them get closer and explore the relationship, which is, we finally get to see these characters be happy." Similarly, Mancini explained "it was also really fun to write the evolving romance between Jake and Devon. That's something that's been important to me from the beginning of the show, creating those characters and wanting to create gay teenage characters in a horror show for gay horror fans to identify with, because that's something I would've loved to have had when I was a kid". Discussing the season finale where Jake reconciles with his homophobic late father, Mancini praised the performance of Arthur and Devon Sawa, calling it "beautiful" and noting that the scenes were a representation of how lots of gay men hold fantasies about reconciling with their dead fathers. Regarding Jake becoming possessed by Chucky, Arthur revealed that he spent a long time with Brad Dourif to ensure he could do a believable impression, and sat in on several of his voice recording sessions, joking "there were moments where me and Brad Dourif were just screaming at each other in the Chucky voice." Arthur also talked about the difficulties he had in returning to using his regular voice, with co-star Alyvia Alyn Lind joking that he had to "get an exorcism" to get back to speaking in his own voice after filming scenes as Jake-Chucky.

=== Casting ===
Arthur's casting in the role was announced on March 5, 2021 alongside that of Jennifer Tilly, Devon Sawa, and the rest of the teenage cast (Björgvin Arnarson, Alyvia Alyn Lind and Teo Briones). During the development of the series, Jake's character initially had the surname "Webber" and was described as "a loner trying to find his place in the world after his mom’s death while never connecting with his dad or his peers". Arthur, whose parents did not let him watch R-rated movies as a kid, had his first introduction to the Child's Play franchise in preparation for his role.

Discussing his role with Collider, Arthur explained that real world issues dealt with in the script first attracted him to the project, stating "I felt like this script dealt with a lot of problems that are actually in the world today, like bullying and having a bad home life with a dad not accepting his sexuality. These are things that happen now, every day. While filming the scenes, I would sometimes stop and think, "People actually go through these things." I just wanted to make sure that I represented everything correctly. Maybe somebody who's going through it can empathize with the show and I hope it helps people." Arthur stated that he talked with Mancini "all the time" about his character and noted that having the "all-time creator of Chucky" as a resource was invaluable to his portrayal of Jake, adding that Mancini would sometimes help him to get into character, as so many elements of Jake's story were based on Mancini's own experiences. Talking with Gizmodo about the show's LGBT themes, Arthur expressed "I think that's very important in a show like this, especially with a younger audience watching it as well. What Don does so well is he implements those ideas and themes without throwing it in your face. It's just part of it. It's just real life. I feel honored to be able to portray that and do a good job of doing that" and explained that several fans of the show have approached him to thank him for his portrayal of a gay boy and what the representation provided by Jake means to them.

== Reception ==
The character of Jake, and the decision to make him the show's lead character, was celebrated by critics, who praised the unapologetic inclusion of an LGBTQ+ character as the protagonist, with Jon O'Brien of Decider stating "queer characters have been a Child's Play mainstay ever since Bride of Chucky's ill-fated David back in 1998, but this series marks the first time they have such a prominent presence". O'Brien also praised Arthur's performance, noting "Jake makes for a sympathetic hero. That’s largely down to Arthur, who nails both the withdrawn demeanor symptomatic of the high school outcast and the occasional giddiness that comes with a first crush." Writing for Screen Rant, Jake Gleason praised the character's dark side, noting that Jake's initial decision to team up with Chucky "allows the series to become its own thing while honoring its roots", adding that Jake's conscious inaction to Chucky's first murder "offers a new dynamic between the lead kid and Chucky that sets itself apart from the original films."

Arthur has received critical praise for his portrayal of Jake, earning Saturn Award for Best Performance by a Younger Actor in a Network/Cable Series nominations at the 47th, 51st, and 52nd Saturn Awards. Jake was also declared one of the "10 Best LGBTQ+ Characters in Horror" by WGTC.
