= Chucky season 3 =

American horror television series

Chucky
- Season 3
- Promotional poster
- Showrunner: Don Mancini
- Starring: Zackary Arthur; Björgvin Arnarson; Alyvia Alyn Lind; Devon Sawa; Brad Dourif
- No. of episodes: 8

Release
- Original network: Syfy; USA Network
- Original release: October 4, 2023 – May 1, 2024

Season chronology
- ← Previous; Season 2

The third season of the American horror series Chucky, created by Don Mancini, premiered on Syfy and USA Network on October 4, 2023. The season consisted of 8 episodes. Based on the Child's Play film franchise, the series serves as a sequel to Cult of Chucky, and stars Brad Dourif reprising his role as the titular character, alongside Zackary Arthur, Alyvia Alyn Lind, Björgvin Arnarson, and Devon Sawa in the ensemble cast.

== Cast and characters ==
=== Main ===
- Zackary Arthur as Jake Wheeler
  - Also portrayed Chucky
- Björgvin Arnarson as Devon Evans
- Alyvia Alyn Lind as Lexy Cross
- Devon Sawa as:
  - President James Collins
  - Randall Jenkins
  - Lucas Wheeler
- Brad Dourif as:
  - Chucky / Charles Lee Ray
    - David Kohlsmith as young Charles Lee Ray (7 years old)
    - Tyler Barish as young Charles Lee Ray (14 years old)
    - Fiona Dourif as Charles Lee Ray (30 years old)
  - Damballa

=== Recurring ===
- Jennifer Tilly as Tiffany Valentine
- Fiona Dourif as Nica Pierce
- Carina London Battrick as Caroline Cross
- Lara Jean Chorostecki as Charlotte Collins
- Jackson Kelly as Grant Collins
- Callum Vinson as Henry Collins
- Annie M. Briggs as Rachel Fairchild
- Ayesha Mansur Gonsalves as Melanie Spiegel
- K. C. Collins as Coop
- Franco Lo Presti as Hicks
- Gil Bellows as Warren Pryce
- Michael Therriault as Vice President Spencer Rhodes

=== Notable guest stars ===
- Alex Vincent as Andy Barclay
- Kenan Thompson as a Cab Driver
- Richard Waugh as Dr. Rosen
- Sarah Sherman as Annie Gilpin
- Nia Vardalos as Evelyn Elliot
- John Waters as Wendell Wilkins

== Episodes ==
No. overall	No. in season	Title	Directed by	Written by	Original release date	U.S. viewers (millions)
Part 1
17	1	"Murder at 1600"	Jeff Renfroe	Nick Zigler & Don Mancini	October 4, 2023	0.172 (SY); 0.207 (USN)
After a power outage in the White House, the secret service gets President James Collins, First Lady Charlotte, and their sons Grant and Henry to an underground bunker for safety. During a conference the next day, press secretary Melanie explains that the outage was just an inconvenience. In the Oval Office, President Collins later introduces Melanie and Vice President Spencer Rhodes to Henry's doll "Joseph", which is actually Chucky. "Joseph" was also the name of Collins's youngest son, who died the previous winter after a terminal cancer diagnosis. When Henry returns home from school, he asks his security detail Teddy to check for "Joseph". Teddy finds Chucky in the Oval Office and picks him up before Chucky steals his gun and shoots him dead. Teddy's death is ruled as a suicide. After Miss Fairchild becomes their legal guardian, Jake, Devon, and Lexy use social media to spread Chucky's awareness and to find Caroline. One night, Chucky sends them a message, taunting that his new residence has "strict policies against visitors". The next morning, Jake, Devon, and Lexy watch the news about Teddy's funeral and see Henry holding Chucky. They decide to travel to the White House and kill Chucky.
18	2	"Let the Right One In"	John Hyams	Catherine Schetina & Amanda Blanchard and Alex Delyle & Rachael Paradis	October 11, 2023	0.124 (SY); 0.261 (USN)
During breakfast, Henry says that "Joseph" wants to go to school and would rather check out the Oval Office. Collins agrees to let "Joseph" come with him one more time. While in the Oval Office, Collins and Rhodes meet Warren Pryce, a government agent investigating Teddy's death. After the three leave, White House secretary Samantha enters and spots Chucky on the floor. When she picks him up, Chucky kills her with a letter opener. After finding Samantha's corpse, Pryce summons Charlotte to help him cover up the incident for the sake of Collins's administration. While attempting to gain access to the White House with Jake and Devon, Lexy connects with Grant on TikTok, and he invites them to the White House's annual Halloween party. Charlotte agrees to meet with Miss Fairchild in the White House. When Pryce summons Charlotte away, Chucky murders Miss Fairchild with a flag and steals her phone. He then calls and taunts Charlotte and Pryce about the murders. Pryce plans to continue covering up any evidence and blackmails Charlotte about Collins's affair. Chucky calls Jake, Devon, and Lexy. He taunts them over Miss Fairchild's death and remarks that he is waiting for them.
19	3	"Jennifer's Body"	John Hyams	Alex Delyle & Rachael Paradis and Catherine Schetina & Amanda Blanchard	October 18, 2023	0.210 (SY); 0.230 (USN)
One year before, a police raid interrupts Chucky from killing Tiffany, who is arrested for Mayor Cross's murder. Nica arrives and attempts to chase Caroline and Chucky, but they escape through the subway. After dreaming about him stabbing Andy to death, Chucky discovers his doll form is starting to age; Chucky visits Dr. Rosen, who is an expert in voodoo, and learns that, as a result of his exorcism at the Catholic School of the Incarnate Lord, Damballa has abandoned him. To regain Damballa's faith and allow him to continue living, he must sacrifice six people in an 'evil' location. Chucky kills six people at 112 Ocean Avenue, Amityville, but the ritual fails, so he chooses the White House as his next location. He visits Joseph's gravesite while the Collinses are mourning, and Henry keeps him. At Tiffany's trial, Nica, Jake, Devon, and Lexy testify against her; Tiffany, as 'Jennifer Tilly', is convicted of Chucky's murders and sentenced to death.
20	4	"Dressed to Kill"	Jeff Renfroe	Rachael Paradis & Don Mancini	October 25, 2023	0.105 (SY); 0.247 (USN)
Despite Charlotte's objections, Pryce convinces her to hold the White House's annual Halloween party to assuage President Collins and the populace. Charlotte hires nanny Annie Gilpin to watch over Henry during the party while Chucky plans for the arrival of Jake, Devon, and Lexy, intending to kill them as his final three sacrifices to Damballa. The three arrive at the White House with a plan to prove Chucky's guilt as well as subdue him. While President Collins sees what appears to be Joseph's spirit, Henry comes downstairs with Chucky. Jake, Devon, and Lexy try to get Chucky to speak, but another power outage ensues. When the lights come on again, a chandelier loosened by Chucky falls, killing Annie and several other partygoers. Henry and "Joseph" are ushered upstairs as the remaining guests are escorted out. Chucky attempts the ritual once again, but it fails again and he discovers he is even older than before. Meanwhile, in prison, Tiffany meets celebrity chef Evelyn Elliot, who quickly despises her upon hearing that she killed Meg. Tiffany also receives a package of voodoo dolls. She uses one to torture and kill Evelyn, then uses another to hypnotize a guard into helping her escape.
Part 2
21	5	"Death Becomes Her"	Samir Rehem	Nick Zigler & Amanda Blanchard & Diana Pawell	April 10, 2024	0.153 (SY); 0.228 (USN)
After the Halloween incident, Collins once again sees Joseph's spirit during a press conference and leaves disorientated. Pryce shows Charlotte security footage from the incident but she dismisses it. Chucky murders the White House's housekeeper but learns that his aging has continued to advance. That night, Chucky calls Tiffany and reveals that he is going to die before both confess their love for each other. Tiffany convinces Chucky to start taking as many lives as he can to become the greatest serial killer of all time. Collins walks through the hallway and follows Joseph's voice to his old room. There, Chucky kills Collins and takes his nuclear access codes. Meanwhile, Jake, Devon, and Lexy try to find a way back into the White House. Lexy reconnects with Grant. Jake and Devon come across Dr. Rosen's website and visit him. He explains that Chucky is dying permanently and the only way they can pursue him into the spirit realm is by dying themselves. While driving home, Jake and Devon stop at a motel for the night, discuss their futures and have sex for the first time.
22	6	"Panic Room"	Samir Rehem	Alex Delyle & Isabella Gutierrez & Amanda Blanchard	April 17, 2024	0.140 (SY); 0.176 (USN)
Charlotte and Pryce find Collins's corpse and witness blood manifestating on the wall that writes "Chucky did it". Charlotte tries to flee, but is stopped. Pryce explains that President Collins's death cannot get out to the public and she, Grant, and Henry are not permitted to leave. Pryce hires Randall Jenkins, a body double, to take Collins's place. Meanwhile, Jake, Devon and Lexy agree to go to the White House. That night, Chucky instructs Henry to take him to a room where a gun is hidden in a wall safe and takes Randall hostage. Chucky leads Henry and Randall to the Situation Room and forces the latter to contact the North American Aerospace Defense Command. Now with access to nuclear missiles, Chucky sets targets for Moscow, Pyongyang, and the North Pole. Lexy convinces Grant to help them, and the group reaches the Situation Room before the missiles are launched. Charlotte, Pryce, and Secret Service agent Coop also arrive, with Coop shooting Chucky in the heart while Randall aborts the missiles. However, Chucky launches the missile to the North Pole before disintegrating into dust. As Pryce scrambles to lock the White House down, the spirit of Charles Lee Ray manifests in the hallway.
23	7	"There Will Be Blood"	Amanda Row	Catherine Schetina & Josh E. Jacobs	April 24, 2024	0.072 (SY); 0.176 (USN)
On the spirit realm, Charles Lee Ray meets Damballa and is challenged to kill as a ghost. Pryce discloses his plans to have Randall tape an announcement explaining that presidency will be transferred to Vice President Rhodes due to a terminal brain cancer while Coop and Grant's security detail Hicks help Charlotte escape with Henry. Pryce summons parapsychologist Carol Lindstrom and her associate Timmy Nash to aid in cleaning the White House of its evil spirits. To persuade Charles' spirit to move on, they must have a séance. Meanwhile, Randall is forced to record Collins' farewell tape but Pryce reveals that he plans to kill him so that there are no witnesses. Randall with a Secret Service agent chasing him. They eventually fight in an elevator, but both drown when it floods with blood. In the séance, the group makes contact with Charles. As Carol tries to get in touch, Charles causes blood to rain down from the fire sprinklers. Carol, Melanie, and Rhodes are killed when Charles throws the listening device to the floor, electrocuting them. Timmy announces that they must meet Chucky in the spirit realm and Jake volunteers to do it. Using a drug provided by Pryce, Jake is temporarily put under cardiac arrest and only has five minutes before Devon must revive him. Meanwhile, Tiffany is restrained and prepped for her lethal injection. From a promise with G.G., Nica, who is watching the execution, passes on Tiffany their farewell message.
24	8	"Final Destination"	Jeff Renfroe	Alex Delyle & Nick Zigler & Don Mancini	May 1, 2024	0.077 (SY); 0.116 (USN)
Jake wakes up in the spirit realm, meets his father Lucas and forgives him. He also finds Charles' spirit who takes him to the White House's movie theatre, where all of his different soul fragments are watching scenes of Chucky's life. Jake notices that Good Chucky runs out and follows him to the Oval Office. Good Chucky says that Caroline is safe with a man named Wendell Wilkins. Jake explains that, to be forgiven for Nadine's death, Good Chucky must sacrifice himself. The other soul fragments enter the room to convince Good Chucky not to go through with it. Jake realizes that all of them are distracting him long enough for Chucky Prime to possess his body. Meanwhile, Tiffany is rescued from her execution by one of the brainwashed prison guards, who escorts her out. Nica tries to stop them but is knocked down as Tiffany escapes in a getaway car. In the White House, Pryce and his agents set up bombs while Devon brings Jake back from the spirit realm, unaware that Chucky is possessing his body. As Jake-Chucky says that he knows where Caroline is being held, Pryce kills Hicks and explodes the bombs. Grant locks Pryce in the Oval Office where he burns alive. Jake-Chucky and Timmy get on the elevator, where Jake-Chucky kills Timmy. Devon, Lexy, and Grant escape from the burning White House just as Charlotte and Henry reunite again with Grant. He sees Collins' and Joseph's spirits, who bid farewell. Jake-Chucky reunites with Devon and Lexy, and leads them to Wendell's address. Wendell is a doll maker who also created the Good Guy dolls. He shows them the prototype Good Guy he created just as Caroline enters the room. Jake-Chucky reveals to Devon and Lexy and, with Caroline's help, he transfers his soul back to the doll. Tiffany also arrives and Chucky expresses that he wishes that they could be a real family again. Caroline transfers Tiffany's soul to Wendell's prototype Belle doll, and she drives away with both Chucky and Tiffany. Nica wheels herself to Wendell's house and discovers that Caroline also transferred Jake's, Devon's, and Lexy's souls into marionette dolls just as Wendell approaches her from behind.

== Production ==
On January 15, 2023, Chucky was renewed for a third season. Despite the 2023 Writers Guild of America strike, filming began in Toronto on April 27 of that year. It was expected to continue through August, however in mid-July production was interrupted due to the 2023 SAG-AFTRA strike. Filming resumed on November 24 and wrapped on December 22 of the same year. The season was split into two parts, with the first half airing in October 2023 and the other half airing in April 2024.

== Reception ==
On Rotten Tomatoes, the third season holds an approval rating of 100% based on 15 reviews, with an average rating of 8.1/10. The website's critics consensus states, Chucky takes Washington and ought to earn every horror fan's vote with this raucous third round of mayhem. Reviewing the first four episodes that were sent to critics, Slash Film's BJ Colangelo said "Brad Dourif continues to dazzle and destroy as the titular doll, and Chucky is as gruesome, raucous, campy, and decidedly envelope-pushing as ever". Collider's Chase Hutchinson highlighted the cast, the kills for being "wonderfully unhinged" and the humor remaining "as sharp as ever".
