= Kyle (Child's Play) =

Fictional character in the Child's Play franchise

- Child's Play character
- Christine Elise McCarthy as Kyle in the 1990 film Child's Play 2.
- First appearance: Child's Play 2 (1990)
- Created by: Don Mancini
- Portrayed by: Christine Elise

In-universe information
- Species: Human
- Relatives: Phil Simpson (deceased foster father); Joanne Simpson (deceased foster mother); Andy Barclay (foster brother)
- Status: Alive

Kyle is a fictional character in the Child's Play franchise, created by Don Mancini and portrayed by actress Christine Elise. She appeared in Child's Play 2, Cult of Chucky, and the Chucky television series.

== Appearances ==
Child's Play	Child's Play 2	Child's Play 3	Bride of Chucky	Seed of Chucky	Curse of Chucky	Cult of Chucky	Chucky
	Main role	Mentioned				Cameo	Recurring role

=== In film ===
==== Child's Play 2 (1990) ====
Kyle first appears in Child's Play 2 (1990). She is a teenager who lives in the foster home where Andy Barclay is sent after the events of the original film. Andy first meets her upon arrival. Kyle is shown to be street-smart and stubborn, and tells her foster mother, Joanne Simpson, that she will be on her own next year. Meanwhile, Chucky infiltrates the house by destroying and burying another "Good Guy" doll they owned and posing as it.

In the morning, one of Joanne's antiques is found shattered (having been broken by Chucky), and both she and Andy are sent to do the laundry, where they begin to talk to one another and become friendly. That night, Kyle stumbles onto Andy, who has been tied up by Chucky. Joanne and her husband Phil discover the scene and blame Kyle. Kyle believes that Andy did it to himself, not realizing Chucky is alive.

Phil is later murdered in the basement by Chucky (although his death appears to be an accident), and Andy is sent back to the orphanage. Kyle discovers the buried "Good Guy" doll and realizes Chucky is really alive. She goes to warn Joanne but finds her corpse tied to a chair. Chucky then attacks Kyle and forces her to drive him to the orphanage. At the orphanage, Chucky escapes with Andy. Kyle follows them to the factory that produces the Good Guy dolls. After a prolonged battle, Kyle and Andy are able to kill Chucky by mutilating him with factory equipment, partially melting him with molten plastic, and then blowing up his head with a pressurized air-tube.

==== Cult of Chucky (2017) ====
Kyle makes a returning cameo appearance in the 2017 film Cult of Chucky. In a post-credits scene, Kyle arrives at Andy's house to torture his decapitated Chucky head. Chucky instantly recognizes and is shocked at Kyle's arrival. Kyle tells the head "Andy sent me. We're gonna have some fun." while holding a pair of pliers.

=== In television ===
==== Chucky (2021-2024) ====
Kyle returns with Andy Barclay in the sixth episode of Chucky season one, Cape Queer. The duo is searching for all remaining dolls possessed by the soul of Charles Lee Ray. They are contacted by Jake Wheeler and travel to Hackensack, New Jersey to help them. After she gets separated from Andy, one of the Chucky dolls tricks Kyle into triggering a bomb set by Tiffany, presumably killing her.

It is revealed in episode four of season two, Death on Denial, that she survived the explosion. She helps Nica Pierce escape from Tiffany with the help of Glen and Glenda. She travels with Nica and Glenda to the School of the Incarnate Lord, where she reunites with Andy and assists with an exorcism to send Chucky to Hell. After the exorcism, Nica transfers the Chucky currently possessing her into another doll, which Andy then kills. Kyle and Andy, believing they are finally done with Chucky, express uncertainty and optimism about their future, and leave the school.

=== In literature ===
Kyle appears in the novelization of Child's Play 2. In 1992, Kyle appeared in the three-issue comic book adaptation of Child's Play 2 released by Innovation Publishing.

== Development ==
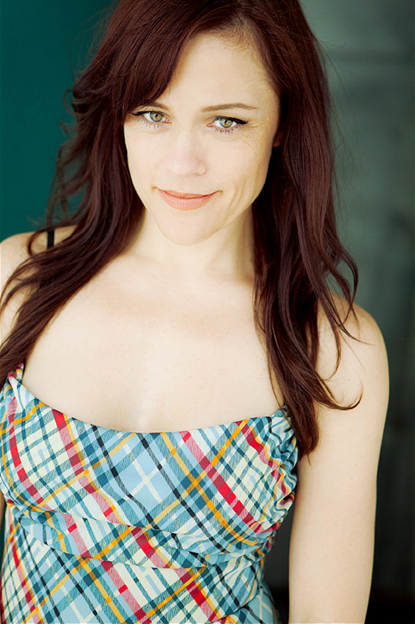
Christine Elise's performance as Kyle received positive reviews.

=== Conception ===
In Cinefantastique, Frederick S. Clarke described Kyle as a "street-smart teenager". In The Film Journal, Kyle is referred to as a "rebellious teenager". Christine Elise was cast in the role and in a retrospective interview she described her experience on set saying:

"It was my first big job & I was insanely excited. I would hang around on set on my days off & after I was wrapped. I just loved every second of it. The hard part was that Alex was a minor and child labour laws applied to him so they had to shoot him first in every scene to get him out in time. Chucky took 7 or 9 puppeteers to work & they all were union guys so – Chucky was expensive to have on set – so they would shoot him after Alex & send those guys home. The result was – if you don't see those guys actually in frame with me – it means they probably were not there. I did a lot of acting looking at coloured pieces of tape in the spots where Alex or Chucky were supposed to be. It was challenging and, of course, I felt ridiculous doing it but I still loved every second."

== Reception ==
In Hearths of Darkness: The Family in the American Horror Film, Updated Edition, Tony Williams stated, "She teaches Andy about the hostile world, warning him of future peer group school treatment as the 'new kid on the block'. Lacking the family that abandoned her at the age of three, Kyle resourcefully decides to survive within successive foster families until she can gain independence. She tells Andy what to expect." Michele Eggen praised the character saying:

"She is fond of wearing cool leather hats and sneaking out of the house at night, so we know that she's a bit of a rebel–or at least wants others to think she is. But Kyle's personality contradicts the image she projects. As a girl who grew up in foster care, one would expect her to have a lot of attitude and anger about her situation but she doesn't. She's not antagonistic toward her foster parents–she smartly recognizes that they are good people. She also becomes a sort of mentor to Andy, a child new to the foster system, by comforting him and giving him advice. Kyle is helpful around the house, she plays with her foster brother, and is a responsible almost-adult who knows how to take care of herself. Basically, she's a good person."

In a review, Tim Brayton described the character as a "textbook Final Girl" and said that she contributed to making the film transition into "slasher territory" saying: "Child's Play 2 solidifies its transition into slasher territory by anointing Kyle as a textbook Final Girl (too textbook, even: the Final Girl tradition of androgynous names does not usually require giving the girl an name that would only ever in any situation be given to a boy), of the sub-breed that must also protect a child in addition to herself." David Nusair praised Elise's performance. Dustin Putman praised Elise's and Alex Vincent's performances stating that they are "possibly the best thing about the film".
