= Nica Pierce =

Fictional character in the Child's Play franchise

- Child's Play character
- Fiona Dourif as Nica in Curse of Chucky
- First appearance: Curse of Chucky (2013)
- Created by: Don Mancini
- Portrayed by: Fiona Dourif

In-universe information
- Full name: Nica Pierce
- Family: Daniel Pierce † (father); Sarah Pierce † (mother); Barb Pierce † (older sister); Alice Pierce † (niece)
- Significant other: Malcolm † (sexual encounter)
- Relatives: Ian † (brother-in-law)
- Birth date: November 25, 1988 (36 years) (United States) Providence, Rhode Island
- Residence: Lochmoor Institution (transferred); Harrogate Institution (escaped/kidnapped); Hackensack (formerly); Beverly Hills (escaped)
- Status: Alive

Nica Pierce is a fictional character in the Child's Play franchise. She was created by Don Mancini and is portrayed by Fiona Dourif. She is the protagonist in Curse of Chucky (2013) and Cult of Chucky (2017) and is also featured in all three seasons of the Chucky television series.

== Appearances ==
Child's Play	Child's Play 2	Child's Play 3	Bride of Chucky	Seed of Chucky	Curse of Chucky	Cult of Chucky	Chucky
					Main role		Recurring role

=== Films ===
==== Curse of Chucky (2013) ====
In Curse of Chucky, Nica Pierce is a paraplegic woman with an unspecified heart disease triggered by stress. She lives with her mother Sarah in a large house with a cage elevator she uses to move between the levels. One day a package arrives containing a Good Guy doll. Later that night she finds her mother dead and her death is ruled a suicide. She is later visited by her sister Barb, her sister's husband Ian, her niece Alice, their live-in nanny Jill and Father Frank. That night, Nica begins to investigate the doll she received on the internet, and discovers the doll's link to serial killer Charles Lee Ray. But Barb ignores Nica's warning, suspecting the 'secret' that Barb refers to is the hidden webcamera which Ian had planted in Chucky's overalls to spy on Barb.

Chucky soon begins killing off Nica's guests and when she hears Barb's screams, Nica crawls up the stairs, unable to use the elevator due to the electricity going out. When she gets to the top she finds Barb dead, and discovers that Chucky is alive. Chucky flees and Nica wakes up Ian, who then takes Nica to the garage where she has a heart attack as Ian accuses her of being a murderer as Chucky is behind him stealing the car keys.

She wakes up taped to her wheelchair, restrained by Ian. Nica tells him that Chucky is responsible for the murders. Ian ignores this, but looks at footage from the camera he had placed on Chucky to catch his wife having an affair on him with Jill. Just as he begins to know the truth about the doll, Chucky murders him with an axe. Nica manages to break the restraints and attack Chucky but gets pushed over the balcony. Nica begs to know his motive, and Chucky reveals himself as a family friend who was secretly in love with Nica's mother Sarah. He says he killed Nica's father and kidnapped Sarah. When Sarah contacted the police and staged his arrest (which is revealed to be the backdrop of Chucky, in his human form as Charles Lee Ray, transferring his soul to a doll), he stabbed her in the stomach, causing Nica's disability.

Nica fights off Chucky before he can kill her but when a police officer walks in and sees Barb's corpse with Nica holding a bloody knife, she gets blamed for the murders and committed to a mental hospital.

==== Cult of Chucky (2017) ====
Fiona Dourif reprises her role as Nica Pierce in Cult of Chucky. Now committed to a mental hospital, she is convinced by the hospital's psychologist and sexual abuser, Dr. Foley, that Chucky was a figment of her imagination and that she truly killed her family during the events of the prior film. After multiple Chucky dolls appear at the hospital, Nica is blamed for the various murders which happen to the other patients. The film ends with Nica becoming possessed by Chucky, and they escape the mental hospital with Tiffany.

=== Television ===
==== Chucky (2021-2024) ====
Nica became a recurring character in the television series Chucky, with Dourif also reprising her role.

In the first season, four years after the events of Cult of Chucky, Nica is still possessed by Chucky and staying with Tiffany in a hotel room in Hackensack, New Jersey, where Chucky and Tiffany are originally from. Nica is able to regain control of her body temporarily, usually at the sight of blood. During one incident she attempts to free a victim Chucky and Tiffany have tied to a chair, but he becomes scared and hits her, allowing Chucky to take control and slit the man's throat. She later tries pretending to be Chucky to trick Tiffany but Tiffany isn't fooled and knocks Nica out with a frying pan.

Tiffany ties Nica up and leaves her trapped inside Charles Lee Ray's childhood home. Later, Devon Evans breaks into the house and discovers Nica, who begs him to set her free. He does, but it turns out it's actually Chucky pretending to be Nica and tasers Devon unconscious. After Chucky splits his soul into an army of dolls, Nica/Chucky get into a fight with Tiffany, who slaps her to the ground, allowing Nica to regain control. One of the Chucky dolls tells Tiffany to kill her, but Tiffany, having developed feelings for Nica, decapitates the doll and knocks Nica out with a sedative. When Nica awakens she is horrified to discover that Tiffany (to protect herself from Chucky) has amputated her arms and legs.

In the second season, Nica has remained under supervision by Tiffany for over a year and has been declared missing. She eventually escapes with the help of Glen and Glenda, Tiffany's twin children who give Nica new metal arms; Chucky Prime, the Chucky who is possessing her; and Andy Barclay's former foster sister Kyle. Nica, Glenda, and Kyle travel to the School of the Incarnate Lord with the intention of freeing her from Chucky Prime. Nica successfully performs the ritual to move Chucky Prime into another doll's body, who Andy then kills. Tiffany and Glen arrive at the school and Nica attempts to get revenge by shooting Tiffany, but Glen jumps in the path of the bullet. She looks on in horror as Tiffany and Glenda take Glen away to get help. Several weeks later, Tiffany has moved to New York with Caroline Cross, a young girl whose mind has been corrupted by Chucky. Nica has followed them to New York, where she calls Tiffany, and, after admitting she has been in regular contact with G.G. (the combined personalities of Glen and Glenda, now in doll form), she promises to follow through with her threat of revenge.

In third season, Nica watches as Tiffany is arrested by the police and spots Chucky with Caroline Cross. She attempts to give chase but loses them when they enter the Subway. She later appears at Tiffany's trial to testify, having been cleared of her family's murders when Tiffany confesses to them. When Tiffany's found guilty, Nica declares that she will be there when she is executed and will roll her wheelchair over her grave. At Tiffany's execution, Nica delivers a goodbye message from G.G. before telling her she hopes she burns in hell. Before she can be executed, a guard that Tiffany had placed under her control with voodoo breaks in and shoots several people, before leaving with Tiffany. Nica attempts to stop them but is knocked out of her wheelchair and forced to watch as Tiffany escapes the prison in her car. However, Nica had somehow managed to place a tracker on Tiffany's car and follows her to the estate of Wendell Wilkins. Upon entering the mansion, she is horrified to discover Jake Wheeler, Lexy Cross and Devon Evans souls have been transferred into marionette dolls. As she attempts to help them, Wendell approaches her from behind and she screams.

== Reception ==
Joey Keogh noted how she is different from other final girls stating that "she is confined to a wheelchair throughout and thus completely unable to revert to typical Final Girl conventions, like running around, screaming her head off. Nica is a remarkably resourceful young woman, who is more than a match for Chucky, even though his main focus is on a younger, more vulnerable charge entirely." Clark Douglas praised Dourif's performance in Curse of Chucky, saying:

Most of the performances aren't worth writing home about, but Fiona Dourif (Brad's daughter) does a fine job as the disabled Nica. While some of the other supporting players suffer from the sort of overacting or stiffness that often plagues low-budget horror films, Dourif delivers a consistently convincing – and even affecting – piece of work. Her dad continues to bring gleeful menace in his voiceover work as Chucky, but gets the opportunity to do some memorable live-action work in the film's third act (which features a terrific black-and-white sequence that elegantly ties this film to Child's Play in a strikingly direct way).

Matt Molgaard praised the character, saying, "Handicapped, forever wheelchair-bound, Dourif's character, Nica, doesn't look too imposing or powerful. In fact, initially she looks a bit fragile. And then shit gets crazy in the film and Nica's defensive mindset spins 180 degrees. Survival instinct takes over, and whether handicapped or not, she's not going down without a fight for the ages." Adam Frazier, who gave the film a mixed review, praised Fiona's performance, stating "Aside from Fiona Dourif, who makes a solid Final Girl, many of the performances are amateurish."

John Atkinson has argued that the treatment of Nica in the Chucky series had undermined her "former progressive and heroic glory" by subjecting her to unremitting torture such that "even Andy Barclay's experiences seemed like a walk in the park compared to hers".
