= Lachlan Watson =

American actor (born 2001)

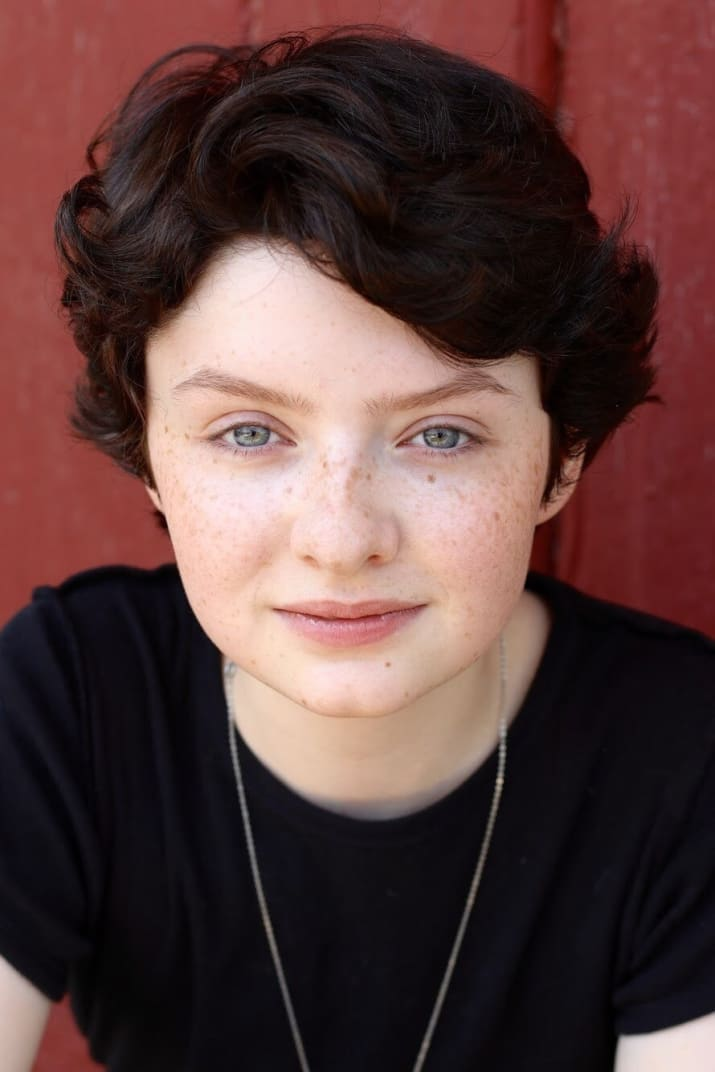
- Watson in 2021
- Born: April 12, 2001 (age 25); Raleigh,[North Carolina, United States
- Occupation: Actor
- Years active: 2018–present

Lachlan Watson (born April 12, 2001) is an American actor, best known for playing trans boy Theo Putnam in the Netflix original series Chilling Adventures of Sabrina, and Glen and Glenda, the genderfluid twin children of Chucky, in the second season of the Syfy/USA Network original series Chucky.

== Early life ==
Watson was born on April 12, 2001, and was raised in Raleigh, North Carolina. Watson received their high school diploma through a homeschooling program in 2018.

== Career ==
Watson began acting as a child at the Burning Coal Theatre, where their mother worked. They became active in the Triangle theatre scene and landed small roles on the television shows Nashville and Drop Dead Diva. In 2015, they performed in the Raleigh Little Theatre's production of William Shakespeare's Much Ado About Nothing.

In 2018, Watson landed a regular role in the Netflix original series Chilling Adventures of Sabrina after a nationwide casting call where they sent in a taped audition. Watson plays a transgender boy named Theo Putnam. Watson stated that they used their own personal experience to shape the character and to influence the way the character's story line is written in order to resonate with genderqueer viewers. At the time of their debut in Chilling Adventures of Sabrina, Watson was one of the youngest non-binary actors in Hollywood.

At Sony Interactive Entertainment's "Future of Gaming" online event for the PlayStation 5 in June 2020, it was revealed that Watson would voice the anthropomorphic protagonist, Fang, of the 2023 video game Goodbye Volcano High. In June 2022, it was revealed they would be portraying non-binary twins Glen and Glenda in the second season of Chucky, later reviving the characters in a series of sketches on their TikTok channel. In 2023, they were cast in the A24 film Y2K.

In 2025, Watson performed in The Pansy Craze Off-Broadway theatre show written and created by Hunter Bird and Mason Alexander Park at the Minetta Lane Theatre. It was later released on Audible.

== Personal life ==
Watson is non-binary and pansexual and uses they/them pronouns. They are a feminist. In November 2018, Watson was featured on a Netflix-produced talk segment titled What I Wish You Knew: About Being Nonbinary, where they discussed gender identity with other non-binary celebrities Jacob Tobia, Liv Hewson, and Shiva Raichandani.

== Filmography ==
=== Film ===
Year	Title	Role	Notes	Ref.
2013	The Ultimate Life	Anna	Feature film debut	
2023	The Unheard	Chloe	Lead	
2023	Only the Good Survive	Faye		
2023	The Kiss List	Mason		
2024	Y2K	Ash		

=== Television ===
Year	Title	Role	Notes	Ref.
2014	Drop Dead Diva	Sam Simbler	Episode: "Identity Crisis"	
2017	Nashville	Kyle	2 episodes	
2018–2020	Chilling Adventures of Sabrina	Theo Putnam	Main cast (35 episodes)	
2020	Social Distance	Riley Holcomb	Episode: "Everything Is V Depressing RN"	
2022	Chucky	Glen / Glenda	Recurring role (6 episodes)	
