= Andy Barclay =

Fictional character in the Child's Play franchise

- Child's Play character
- Alex Vincent as Andy Barclay in Child's Play 2 (1990)
- First appearance: Child's Play (1988)
- Created by: Don Mancini
- Portrayed by: Alex Vincent (1988–1990, 2013–2023); Justin Whalin (1991); Gabriel Bateman (2019)

In-universe information
- Full name: Andrew Barclay
- Gender: Male
- Relatives: Karen Barclay (mother); Bob Barclay (deceased father); Mike Norris (stepfather); Kyle (foster sister); Phil Simpson (deceased foster father); Joanne Simpson (deceased foster mother); Maggie Peterson (aunt); Mickey Rooney (deceased pet; 2019 reboot)
- Nationality: American
- Status: Alive

Andrew "Andy" Barclay is a fictional character and the main protagonist of the Child's Play franchise. He first appeared in 1988's Child's Play and has gone on to be featured in multiple subsequent installments. Andy was created by Don Mancini and has been portrayed by actors Alex Vincent and Justin Whalin in the original series.

In the films, Andy is frequently a target of Chucky the killer doll, who wishes to take over his body using voodoo magic and later to simply kill him.

A different version of Barclay was portrayed by Gabriel Bateman in the 2019 reboot Child's Play.

== Appearances ==
=== Original series ===
Child's Play	Child's Play 2	Child's Play 3	Bride of Chucky	Seed of Chucky	Curse of Chucky	Cult of Chucky	Chucky
Main role					Cameo	Main role	Recurring role

==== Child's Play (1988) ====
On his sixth birthday, Andy is gifted a Good Guy brand talking doll named "Chucky" by his mother Karen. Unbeknownst to both the two, the doll was possessed by serial killer Charles Lee Ray, who transferred his soul into it using voodoo. That night, Karen's best friend Maggie is murdered by Chucky. Investigating officer Mike Norris believes Andy may have been involved in Maggie's death.

The next day, Chucky convinces Andy to take him to his former accomplice Eddie Caputo's house. Chucky kills Caputo, and Andy is institutionalized under suspicion of the murders. Chucky comes to find Andy, hoping to transfer his soul into the boy. Andy manages to escape while Chucky kills his doctor. Andy flees home where Chucky knocks him out. Karen and Detective Norris, who have come to learn that the doll is alive, arrive and manage to save Andy. Together, the three finally kill the doll by burning and shooting it.

==== Child's Play 2 ====
Two years after the previous film, Karen Barclay is undergoing a psychiatric evaluation after telling authorities that Chucky was alive. Andy is sent to live with foster parents Phil and Joanne Simpson; he also meets his new foster sister Kyle. Chucky is inadvertently revived and tries to track Andy down once again, infiltrating the Simpson household.

Chucky eventually reveals himself to Andy, and kills several people around him, including his teacher Miss Kettlewell, along with Phil and Joanne. Kyle and Andy eventually manage to overpower and kill Chucky at the Good Guy doll factory, mutilating him, covering him in molten plastic and finally blowing his head apart with an air-hose.

==== Child's Play 3 ====
Eight years later, a now 16-year-old Andy is sent to the Kent Military School. Andy befriends several fellow cadets, including the cowardly Whitehurst, a young boy named Tyler, and a beautiful cadet named De Silva, who develops romantic feelings for him.

Chucky, who has been revived once again, tracks Andy down, intending to transfer his soul into his old nemesis, but instead shifts his focus to Tyler. Chucky orchestrates the death of several staff and students, including Whitehurst. Andy and De Silva chase Chucky and Tyler to a nearby carnival. Andy manages to save Tyler and kill Chucky by shredding his body apart in a massive metal fan. Andy bids De Silva farewell before being taken away by police for questioning.

==== Curse of Chucky ====
In a post-credits scene, Chucky mails himself to a now-adult Andy, seeking to finally kill his old nemesis. However, Andy gets the drop on him and shoots him in the head with a shotgun.

==== Cult of Chucky ====
Andy keeps the severed head of Chucky locked up in a safe, torturing him in retribution for ruining his life. Andy has tried to prove Nica Pierce's innocence by showing Chucky's severed head to her psychiatrist Dr. Foley, but Foley dismisses the living doll as "special effects."

Andy later learns that Chucky found a way to replicate his soul, allowing him to control multiple hosts at once. Desperate to stop his enemy, Andy travel to the asylum where Nica has been committed and assaults a guard, getting himself locked up inside. He manages to kill one of the now-several Chucky dolls, but the primary Chucky has taken over Nica's body and escapes, leaving Andy locked in his cell.

==== Chucky (TV Series) ====
In the first season, Andy and his foster sister Kyle have been hunting down and executing the remaining possessed Chucky dolls. He contacts Jake Wheeler when he posts about buying a Good Guy doll online. Jake eventually gets back in contact with Andy after learning that Chucky is evil; Andy promises to come help him. Andy later abandons Kyle at a gas station, not wanting to endanger her life any further. After a series of treacherous close-calls, Andy discovers that Chucky has created an army of duplicates, which are loaded into a mail-truck to be sent around the United States. Andy hijacks the truck, only for a duplicate of the Tiffany doll to pop up and hold him at gunpoint.

In the second season, Andy is gravely injured when he drives the mail-truck off a cliff to kill as many of the Chucky dolls as possible. A Chucky doll known as "The Colonel" takes Andy hostage and tortures him for a year before he is finally saved by Devon and Lexy. Andy later kills "The Colonel" and takes part in an exorcism to try and send Chucky's soul to hell. The exorcism fails and Chucky manages to escape. Andy follows and shoots the doll numerous times, finally appearing to kill his old foe. However, he is unaware that Chucky had swapped his soul into the body of his former psychologist, Dr. Mixter, and escaped.

In the third season, Chucky has a dream about brutally murdering Andy, only to wake up laughing with glee.

=== Reboot film ===
==== Child's Play (2019) ====
Andy is a pre-teen boy with hearing loss who receives a Kaslan-brand Buddi doll from his mother Karen. However, both are unaware that the doll's artificial intelligence had been tampered with by a disgruntled employee. Andy becomes attached to the doll, who calls itself "Chucky," and soon after befriends local kids Pugg and Fayln.

However, Chucky slowly starts to display signs of aggression, and eventually begins to murder people it perceives as "threatening" his friendship with Andy, including his mother's boyfriend Shane and his elderly neighbor Doreen. Andy is suspected of the murders, but is proven innocent when Chucky goes on a killing spree at a department store. Andy stabs Chucky in the chest, Doreen's son Detective Mike Norris shoots the doll, and finally Karen pulls its head off, destroying it. Andy, Pugg and Fayln burn his remains, unaware that elsewhere, another Buddi doll is seemingly also corrupted.

=== Other media ===
==== Comics ====
In 1991, Andy appeared in 3 issues (1,2, & 5) of the Child's Play comic book series, which were based on the first film. He was also in all issues based on Child's Play 2 in 1992 and all based on Child's Play 3 in 1993.

==== Novels ====
Andy appears in the novelization of Child's Play 2 and the novelization of Child's Play 3.

==== Documentaries ====
In 1999, clips of Andy are shown in the television series Where Are They Now?, as a part of the episode Horror Movie Stars.

Archive footage of Andy is shown in the 2001 horror documentary Boogeymen: The Killer Compilation.

Andy is shown throughout the documentary Evil Comes in Small Packages, which was included as a special feature in the 20th anniversary edition of Child's Play in 2008.

== Reception ==
Alex Vincent's performance as Andy has been praised for being "one of the best child performances in a horror movie" and for being able to create an "emotional connection" with the audience. From his first scene in the movie to his sobbing in the hospital room he is able to bring out emotions that seem far too real. The article went on to say:

"Watching him sob alone in his tiny hospital room feels like seeing my own kid cry – but not the kind of crying when he doesn't get his way or stubs his toe. It's the kind of crying informed by genuine sadness. There is a hopelessness to the way Alex Vincent plays that scene that's impossible to reproduce. What makes his performance great is that it is totally, effortlessly authentic. He is not manufacturing motivation, nor calculating his delivery. He is reacting purely in the moment. When they are best friends, he interacts with Chucky like it's an actual toy that he loves (the way he excitedly talks to the doll way too loudly when they first interact is another great moment in the movie). When Chucky goes bad, Vincent's fear – and even heartbreak – is totally real."

Dustin Putman stated in a review that he was "always convincing as an endangered... son faced with an unthinkable terror." Another article went as far as to say Vincent's portrayal "was what made that series as much as Brad Dourif doing the voice of Chucky."
