= Teo Briones =

British and American actor (born 2005)

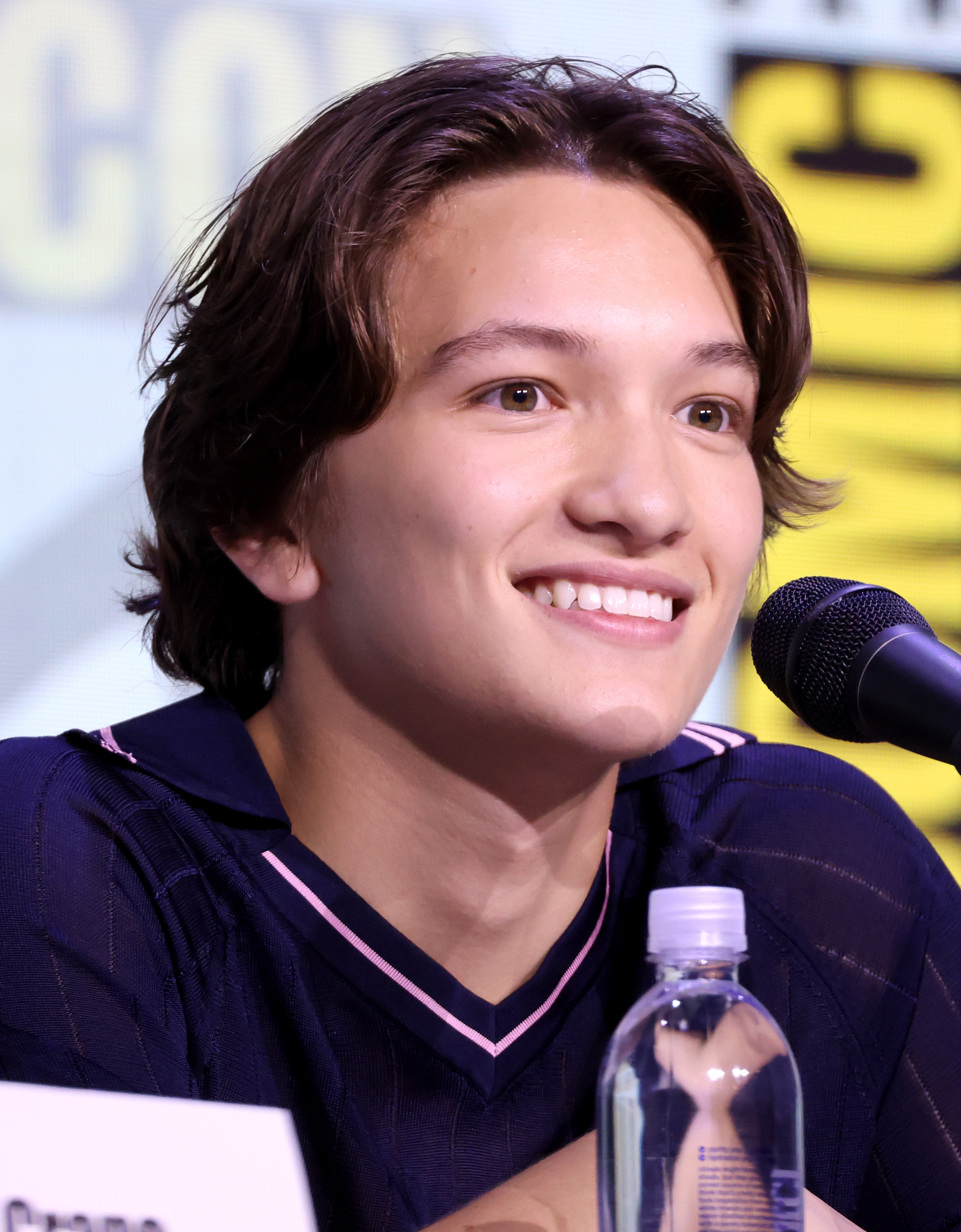
- Briones at the 2025 San Diego Comic-Con
- Born: Mateo Justis Briones; January 11, 2005 (age 21); Oxford, England
- Citizenship: United States; United Kingdom (Note: Briones has dual citizenship: American (by residence) and British (by birth).)
- Occupations: Actor; musician
- Years active: 2010–present
- Notable work: Chucky; Final Destination Bloodlines; Five Nights at Freddy's 2
- Father: Jon Jon Briones
- Relatives: Isa Briones (sister)

Mateo Justis Briones (born January 11, 2005) is an American actor and musician. He is best known for his starring roles as Junior Wheeler in the Syfy and USA Network series Chucky (2021) and as Charlie Reyes in the supernatural horror film Final Destination Bloodlines (2025). He's also appeared in the Freeform teen drama series Pretty Little Liars (2012–2013) and the Netflix psychological thriller series Ratched (2020).

== Early life ==
Briones was born in Oxford, England while his parents were on tour. Born into a family of thespians, his father is Filipino actor and singer Jon Jon Briones and his mother is American actress and singer Megan Briones (née Johnson). His sister, Isa Briones, is also an actress and singer. His family relocated to Los Angeles when he was 3 years old and he began acting and modeling at the age of 5. In addition to acting, he is also a musician, playing guitar, bass and drums. He's proficient in XMA, gymnastics, acrobatics, cinematic martial arts and has a blue belt in karate. He also has experience in dance, having had training in hip-hop, ballet and tap.

== Career ==
In 2012, Briones was cast in his first prominent role in the drama series Pretty Little Liars in a recurring capacity during the third and fourth seasons. The following year, he joined the soap opera Days of Our Lives for six episodes. That same year, Briones made his film debut in the comedy-drama film Lonely Boy, which also featured his older sister. In 2017, he co-starred in the neo-Western drama film Wind River, playing the young son of a service agent investigating the mysterious murder of a young woman on a Native American reservation. In 2020, Briones appeared in the Ryan Murphy Netflix series, Ratched, a prequel to the 1975 film.

In 2024, Briones was cast in the Warner Bros. Pictures-produced Final Destination Bloodlines (2025), the sixth entry in the Final Destination franchise. In 2025, he appeared in Five Nights at Freddy's 2.

== Filmography ==
Key
†	Denotes films that have not yet been released

=== Film ===
Year	Title	Role	Notes	Ref.
2013	Lonely Boy	Jonny	Feature film debut	
2013	Chase Me Through	Jon	Short film	
2017	Wind River	Casey Lambert		
2021	Agent Revelation	Larry Higgins		
2024	Agent Recon	Larry Higgins		
2025	Final Destination Bloodlines	Charlie Reyes	Main role	
2025	Five Nights at Freddy's 2	Alex		

=== Television ===
Year	Title	Role	Notes
2010	Cutthroat	Alex Cabrera	TV film
2011	Special Agent Oso	Javier	Voice role; Episode: "For Tamales with Love/Pinata Royale"
2011	Kickin' It	Young Jack Brewer	Episode: "Boo Gi Nights"
2011	Death Valley	Kid	Episode: "Tick... Tick... BOOM!"
2012	Parks and Recreation	Joey	Episode: "Pawnee Commons"
2012	Pretty Little Liars	Malcolm Cutler	Recurring role; Season 3–4 (4 episodes)
2013	Days of Our Lives	Timmy Bernardi	Recurring role; Season 12 (6 episodes)
2013	Modern Family	Santa Kid	Episode: "The Old Man & the Tree"
2013–2016	Doc McStuffins	Carlos	Voice role; 3 episodes
2014	Stalker	Landon Richards	Episode: "Skin"
2014	Disorganized Zone	Logan	Episode: "Deadly Labels"
2015	Longmire	Cade Tall Grass	Episode: "Four Arrows"
2015	The Whispers	Silas	Episodes: "Homesick" and "Traveller in the Dark"
2016	Lethal Weapon	Ethan McFadden	Episode: "Can I Get a Witness"
2017	Will vs. The Future	Will Jin	Unproduced pilot
2020	Ratched	Peter	Recurring role; 3 episodes
2021	Chucky	Junior Wheeler	Main role; Season 1 (8 episodes)

=== Theater ===
Year	Production	Role	Location	Category	Notes
2023	Opus 9 No. 2	Lead	Blank Theatre Company	Young Playwrights Festival (Los Angeles)	
2024	A Long Time Coming	Alder	Main Stage Theatre	Ashland New Plays Festival (Ashland)	

== Awards and nominations ==
Award	Year	Category	Nominated work	Result	Ref.
BAM Award	2017	Best Cast	Wind River	Won	
