= Zackary Arthur =

American actor (born 2006)

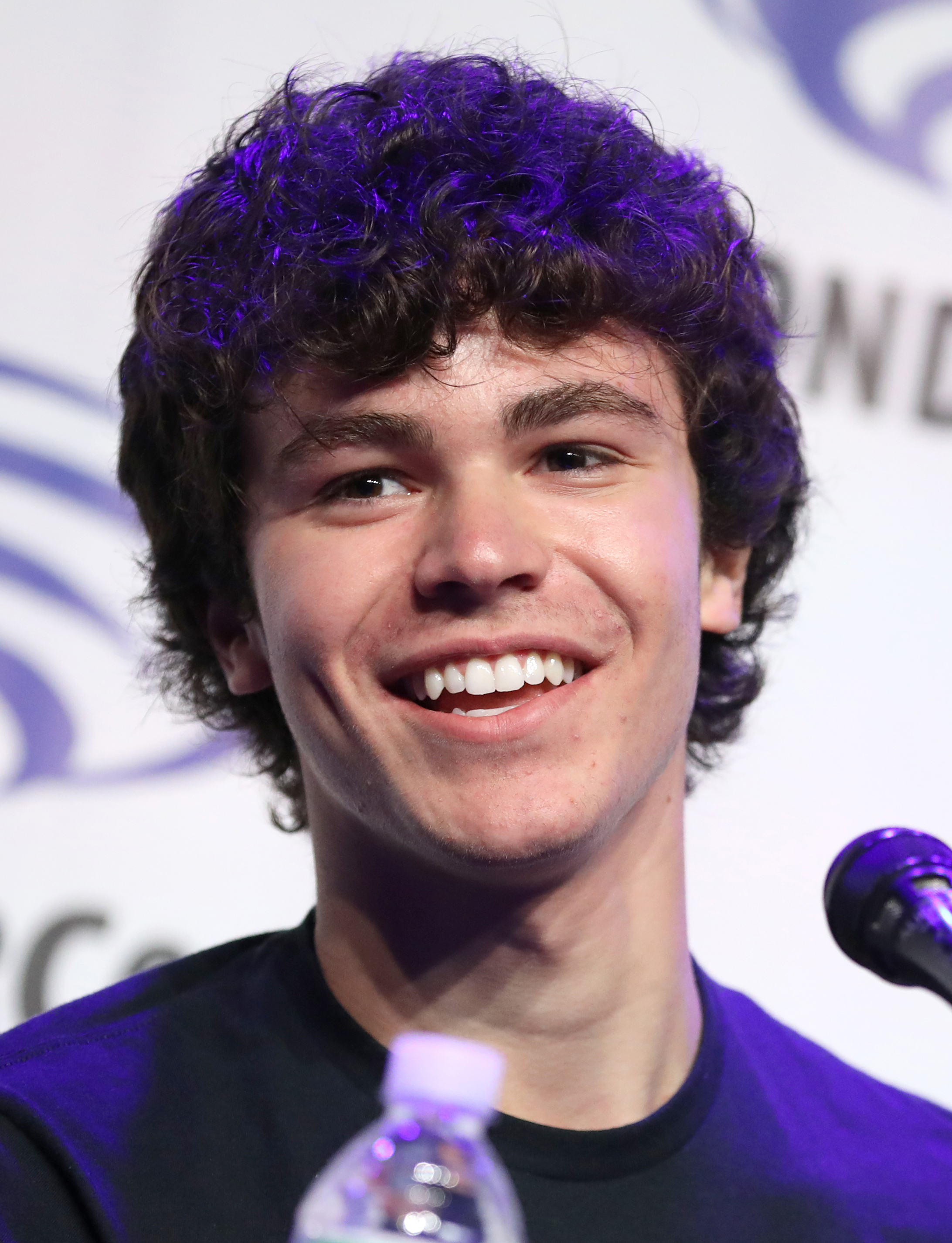
- Arthur at the 2024 WonderCon
- Born: Zackary Arthur Herrera; September 12, 2006 (age 20); Los Angeles, California, U.S.
- Occupation: Actor
- Years active: 2013–present
- Notable work: Transparent; The 5th Wave; Chucky

Zackary Arthur Herrera (born September 12, 2006) is an American actor, known for portraying the lead role of Jake Wheeler in Chucky, a television continuation of the Child's Play film franchise, for which he was nominated for the Saturn Award for Best Performance by a Younger Actor in a Network or Cable Television Series.

== Career ==
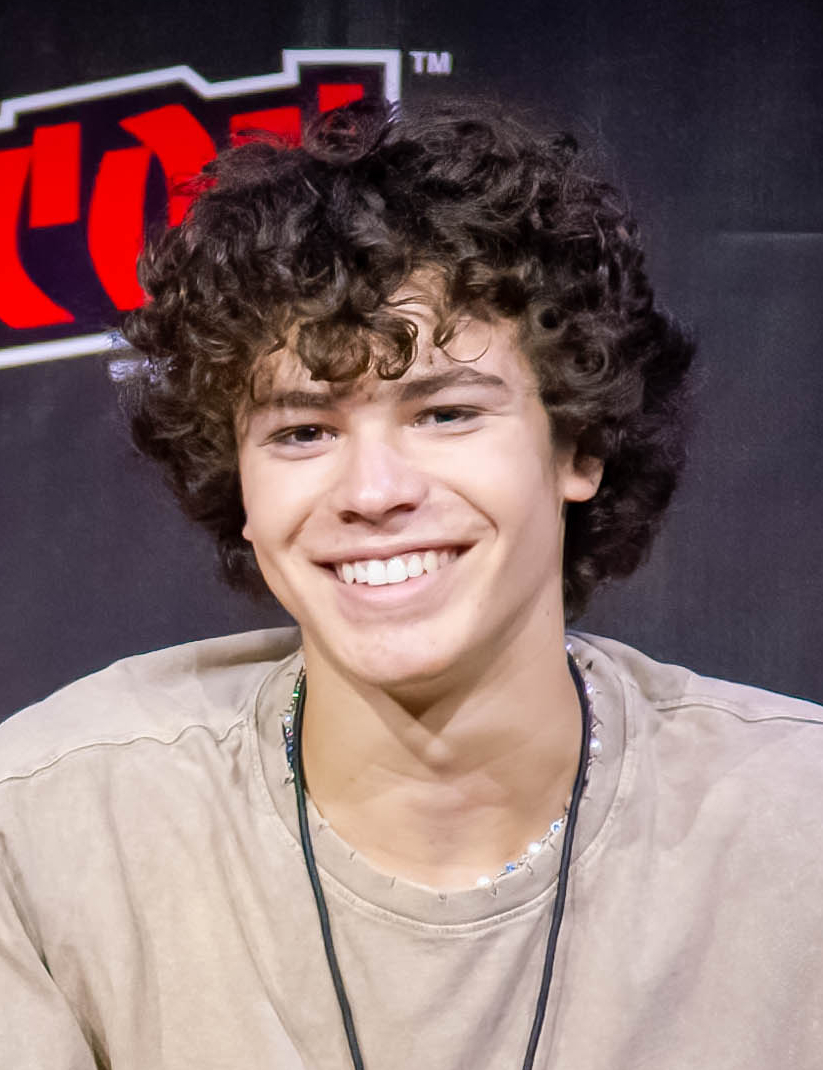
Arthur at the 2022 New York Comic Con

Arthur made his acting debut in 2014 playing Zack Novak in the Amazon Studios' comedy-drama series Transparent along with Jeffrey Tambor.

Arthur played one of the lead roles, Sammy Sullivan, in the film The 5th Wave (2016), along with Chloë Grace Moretz and Nick Robinson, and directed by J Blakeson. He was one of hundreds of young actors who auditioned for the role. The film was released on January 22, 2016, by Columbia Pictures.

He also played a role in the CBS comedy pilot The Half of It in 2015, and appeared in the Grey's Anatomy episode, "Trigger Happy".

In 2017, he starred as Josh Ryan in the horror comedy film Mom and Dad. In 2021, he was cast in the television series Chucky as the show's main protagonist, Jake Wheeler. The show was renewed for a second season and aired on October 5, 2022. In January 2023, the series was renewed for a third season, which premiered on October 4, 2023, and aired in two parts, with the second half coming on April 10, 2024.

== Filmography ==
=== Film ===
Year	Title	Role	Notes
2014	Trust Me	Little Nate	Short film
2014	Surviving A Funeral	Young Ben	Short film
2015	Turned	Cameron	Short film
2016	The 5th Wave	Sam Sullivan	
2017	Don't Come Back from the Moon	Kolya Smalley	
2017	Mom and Dad	Josh Ryan	
2018	These Things Take Time	Zander Cooley	Short film
2020	Secret Agent Dingledorf and His Trusty Dog Splat	Bernie Dingledorf	
2021	Hero Dog: The Journey Home	Max Davis	

=== Television ===
Year	Title	Role	Notes
2014–2019	Transparent	Zack Novak	19 episodes
2015	Best Friends Whenever	9 Year Old Naldo	Episode: "The Butterscotch Effect"
2015	Teachers	David	3 episodes
2015	The Half of It	Will	TV movie
2016	Grey's Anatomy	Peter Green	Episode: "Trigger Happy"
2017	Ray Donovan	Freddy Jr.	Episode: "Mister Lucky"
2018	S.W.A.T.	Boy	Episode: "Source"
2018–2020	Kidding	Young Jeff	3 episodes
2019	Better Things	Shak's Bully Friend	Episode: "Holding"
2021–2024	Chucky	Jake Wheeler	Main role
2026	Chicago Med	Scott Baird	2 episodes
