= Alex Vincent (actor) =

American actor (born 1981)

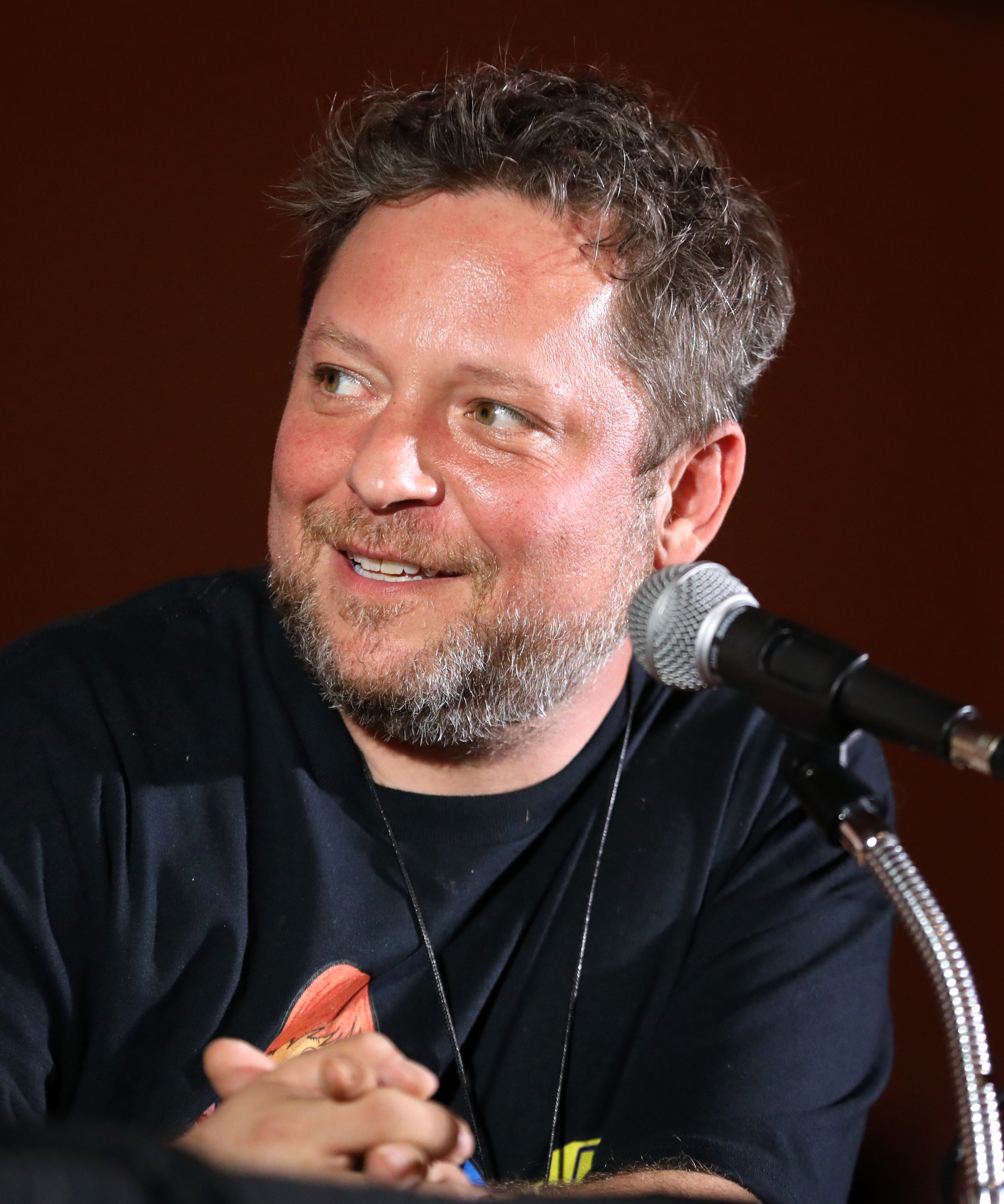
- Alex Vincent in 2024
- Born: Alexander Vincent LoScialpo; April 29, 1981 (age 45); Newark, New Jersey, U.S.
- Occupations: Actor; writer; sound engineer
- Years active: 1988–1993; 2008–present
- Website: www.alexvincentonline.com

Alexander Vincent LoScialpo (born April 29, 1981) is an American actor, writer and sound engineer. He is known for his role as Andy Barclay in the Child's Play franchise, having played the character in Child's Play (1988), Child's Play 2 (1990), Curse of Chucky (2013), Cult of Chucky (2017) and again for the Syfy/USA Network television series Chucky (2021–2024).

== Early life ==
Vincent was born April 29, 1981, in Newark, New Jersey and raised in Maywood, New Jersey. He graduated in 1999 from Hackensack High School. He is of Italian and one quarter Irish descent.

== Career ==
Vincent's desire for acting began at the age of five, when he saw his neighbor on television. He went to her agent and was able to get parts in several commercials. In 1987, he auditioned for the role of Andy Barclay in Child's Play. He competed against hundreds of boys, which was then narrowed down to Vincent and two other kids his age. During auditioning, he refused to swear in front of his mother. He impressed the producers and landed the role.

He is the owner and producer at AV Productions Recording Studio and Production Company in Clearwater, Florida.

== Personal life ==
He graduated from Hackensack High School in 1999. Vincent also attended Full Sail University in Winter Park, Florida.

== Filmography ==
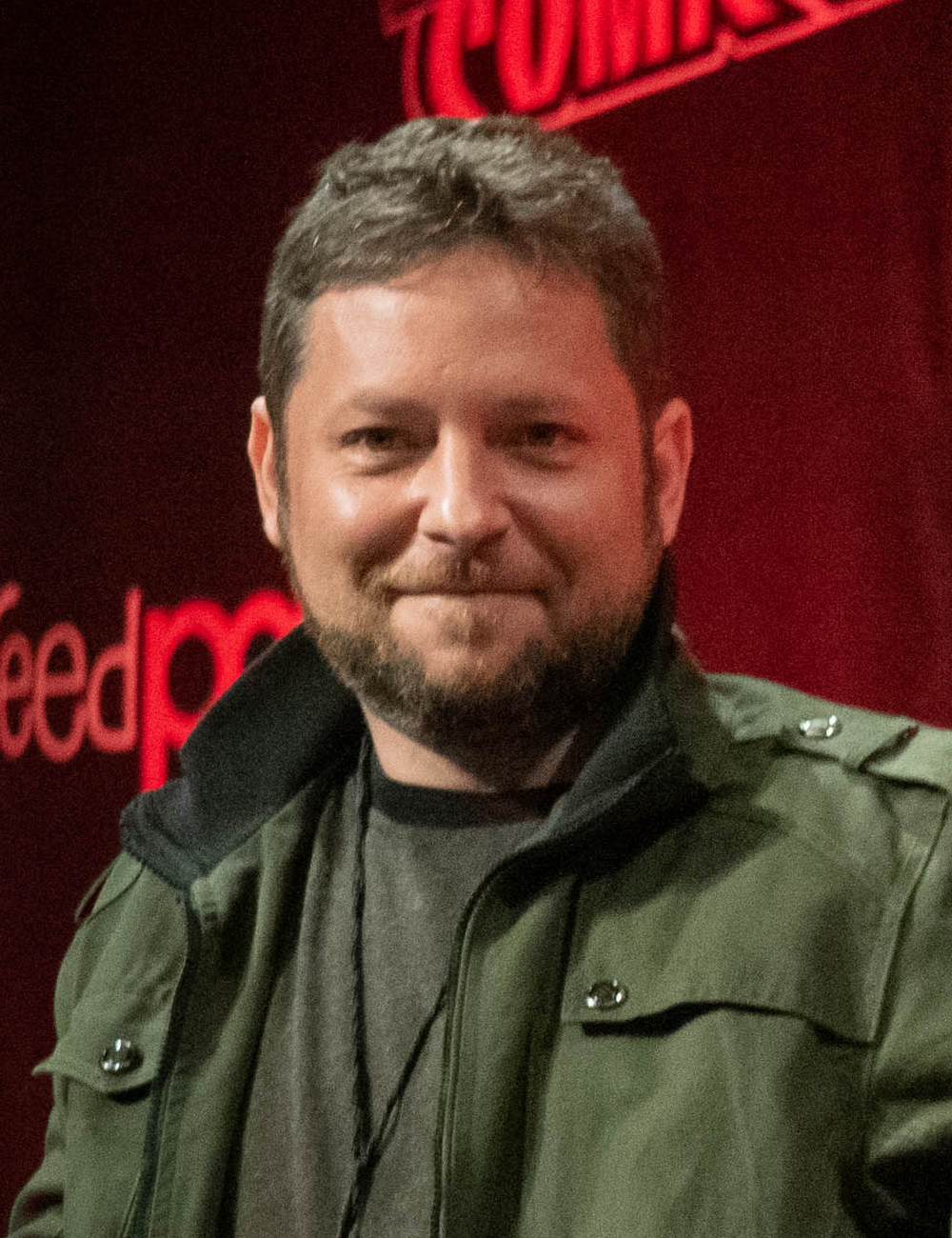
Alex Vincent at the 2021 New York Comic Con

=== Film ===
Year	Title	Role	Note
1988	Child's Play	Andy Barclay	
1989	Wait Until Spring, Bandini	Federico Bandini	
1990	Just Like in the Movies	Carter Legrand	
1990	Child's Play 2	Andy Barclay	
1993	My Family Treasure	Jeff Danieloff	
2008	Dead Country	Alex	
2011	On the Ropes	Prank caller	
2013	Curse of Chucky	Andy Barclay	Post-credits scene
2013	House Guest	Rob Murphy	
2017	The Dark Military	Vince	
2017	Descending	Craven	
2017	Cult of Chucky	Andy Barclay	
2019	The Dark Military	Vince	

=== Television ===
Year	Title	Role	Note
2020	South of Central	Himself	Episode: "Bad Decisions"
2021–2024	Chucky	Andy Barclay	Recurring role

=== Crew work ===
- Frost Bite (2012) - Sound designer
- House Guest Massacre (2013) - Composer, writer
- 10 Seconds to Run (2016) - Sound editor, composer
- South of Central (2020) - Sound editor (13 episodes)
- Koko (2021) - Sound Mixer
- Sorority of the Damned (2025) - Sound
