= Montell Jordan discography =

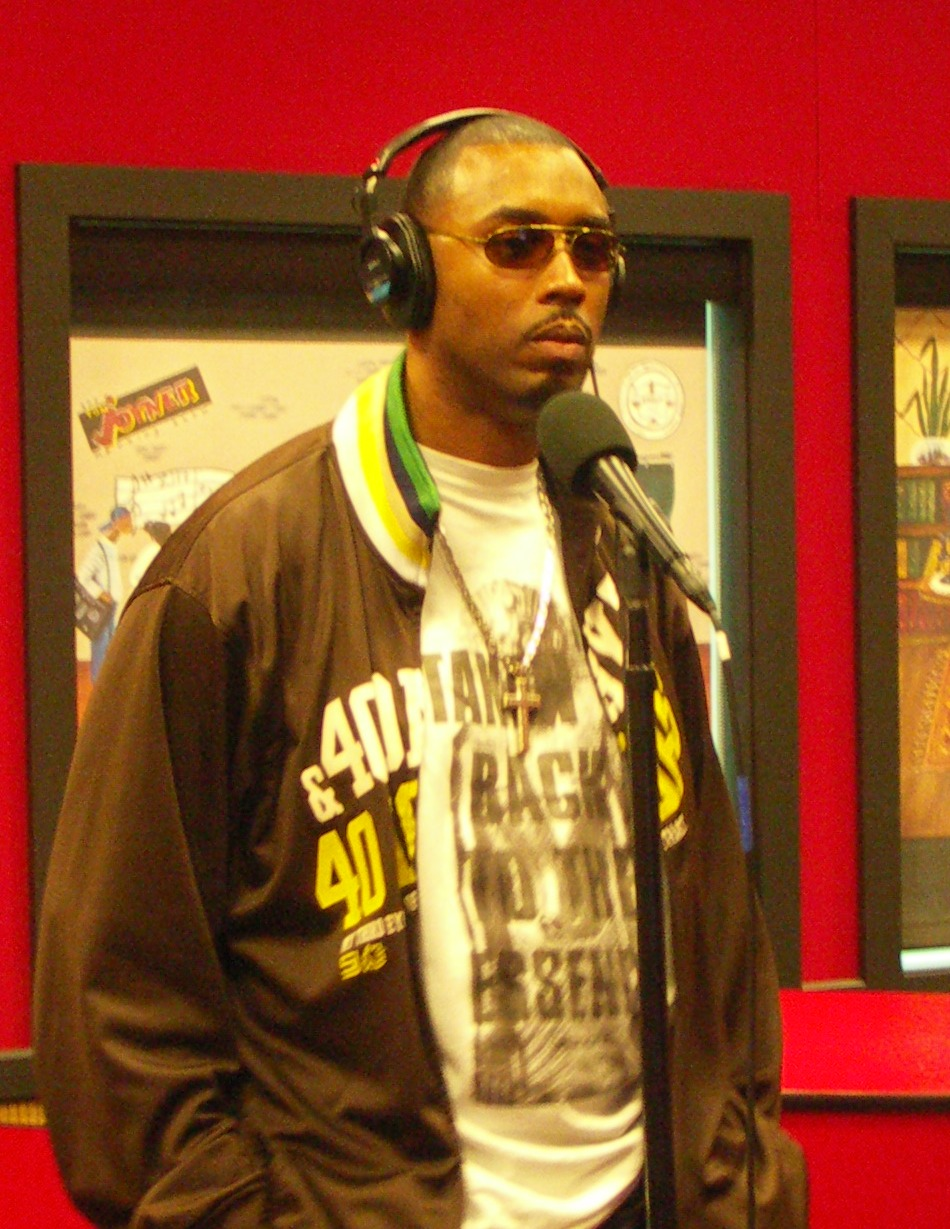
- Jordan at the Tom Joyner studios in 2008
- Studio albums: 8
- Singles: 14

The discography of American recording artist Montell Jordan consists of 8 studio albums and 14 singles.

== Studio albums ==
Year	Title	Chart positions			Certifications (sales thresholds)
Year	Title	US	US R&B	AUS	Certifications (sales thresholds)
1995	This Is How We Do It: Released: April 4, 1995; Label: Def Jam	12	4	69	US: Platinum
1996	More...: Released: August 27, 1996; Label: Def Jam	47	14	—	US: Gold
1998	Let's Ride: Released: March 31, 1998; Label: Def Jam	20	8	—	US: Gold
1999	Get It On...Tonite: Released: November 9, 1999; Label: Def Jam	32	3	—	US: Gold
2002	Montell Jordan: Released: February 26, 2002; Label: Def Jam	—	—	—	
2003	Life After Def: Released: October 21, 2003; Label: Koch	—	54	—	
2008	Let It Rain: Released: October 21, 2008; Label: Fontana	—	67	—	
2019	Masterpeace: Released: November 29, 2019; Label: Masterpiece Recordings	—	—	—	
"—" denotes a recording that did not chart or was not released in that territory.

== Singles ==
Year	Single	Peak chart positions										Certifications (sales thresholds)	Album
Year	Single	US	US R&B	AUS	CAN	FRA	GER	NED	NZ	SWI	UK	Certifications (sales thresholds)	Album
1995	"This Is How We Do It"	1	1	7	8	34	38	11	5	38	11	US: 5× Platinum; UK: Platinum	This Is How We Do It
1995	"Somethin' 4 da Honeyz"	21	18	19	—	—	—	—	8	—	15	US: Gold	This Is How We Do It
1995	"Daddy's Home"	—	74	—	—	—	—	—	—	—	—	—	This Is How We Do It
1996	"I Like" (featuring Slick Rick)	28	11	90	—	—	—	—	—	—	24	—	More...
1996	"Falling"	18	8	98	—	—	—	—	15	—	—	US: Gold	More...
1997	"What's On Tonight"	21	7	—	—	—	—	—	—	—	—	US: Gold	More...
1998	"Let's Ride" (featuring Master P and Silkk the Shocker)	2	1	—	—	—	—	—	14	—	25	US: Platinum	Let's Ride
1998	"I Can Do That"	14	4	—	—	—	—	—	—	—	—	US: Gold	Let's Ride
1998	"When You Get Home"	—	74	—	—	—	—	—	—	—	—	—	Let's Ride
1999	"Get It On Tonite"	4	1	—	15	28	21	8	43	13	15	US: Gold; UK: Silver	Get It On...Tonite
2000	"Once Upon a Time"	—	35	—	—	—	44	15	—	53	—	—	Get It On...Tonite
2001	"You Must Have Been"	—	44	—	—	—	—	85	—	—	—	—	Montell Jordan
2003	"Supa Star"	—	71	—	—	—	—	—	—	—	—	—	Life After Def
2008	"Me and U"	—	71	—	—	—	—	—	—	—	—	—	Let It Rain
2008	"Not No More"	—	—	—	—	—	—	—	—	—	—	—	Let It Rain
2013	"You Are"	—	18	—	—	—	—	—	—	—	—	—	Non-album single
2019	"When I'm Around You" (featuring Lecrae)	—	—	—	—	—	—	—	—	—	—	—	Masterpeace
"—" denotes a recording that did not chart or was not released in that territory.

== Music videos ==
Year	Video	Director
1995	"This Is How We Do It"	Hype Williams
1995	"Somethin' 4 da Honeyz" (version 1)	Hype Williams
1995	"Somethin' 4 da Honeyz" (version 2)	Daniel Zirilli
1995	"Daddy's Home"	Daniel Zirilli
1996	"I Like" (featuring Slick Rick)	Joseph Kahn
1996	"Falling"	R.A.S.H.I.D.I.
1997	"What's On Tonight"	R.A.S.H.I.D.I.
1998	"Let's Ride" (version 1: featuring Master P and Silkk the Shocker)	Joseph Kahn
1998	"Let's Ride" (version 1: featuring Master P and Silkk the Shocker)	R.A.S.H.I.D.I.
1998	"I Can Do That"	Joseph Kahn
1998	"When You Get Home"	Charles de Lauzirika
1999	"Get It On Tonite"	Little X
2000	"Once Upon a Time"	Marcus Raboy
2002	"You Must Have Been"	Steve Carr
2004	"Supa Star"	Eric Shue
2008	"Not No More" (featuring Cignature)	
