= Chuki =

Chuki may refer to:

- Trite Chuki, a rocky summit in the western Balkan Mountains
- Sonam Chuki (born 1963), Bhutanese archer
- Vaanki Chuki Love Story, 2026 Indian Gujarati romantic comedy
- Chuki (footballer)

== See also ==
- Chuckie (disambiguation)
- Chucky (disambiguation)
- Chukie Nwokorie (born 1975), American football player
- Kesang Chuki Dorjee (born 1976), Bhutanese politician
