= Chuck =

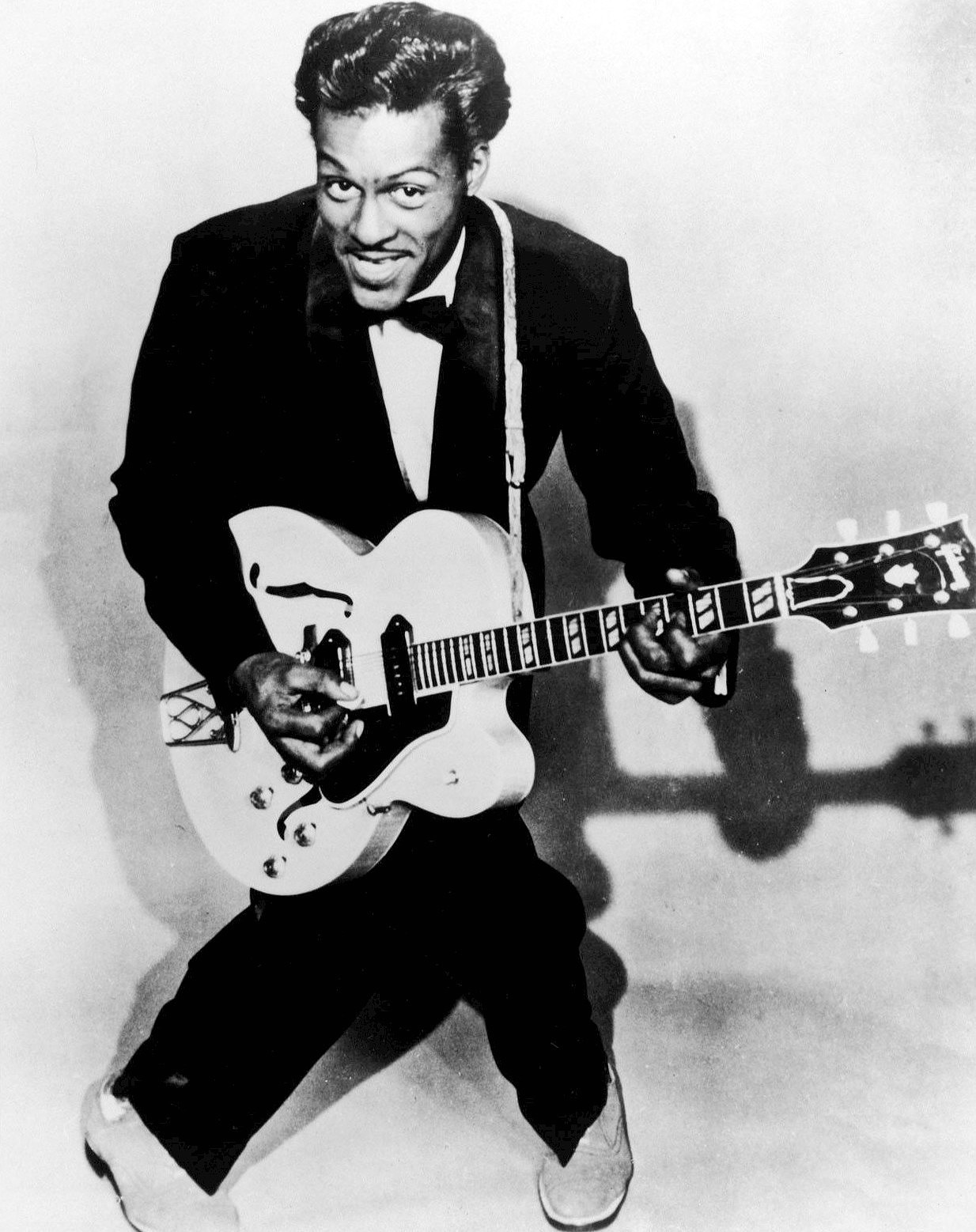
- Chuck Berry in 1957
- Pronunciation: /tʃʌk/ CHUCK
- Gender: Male
- Language: English

Origin
- Languages: 1. Germanic; 2. French; 3. English
- Origin: Diminutive form of Charles
- Region of origin: American English

Other names
- Alternative spelling: Chucky; Chuckie
- Related names: Charles, Chucky, Chuckie, Carlo, Carlos, Carlton

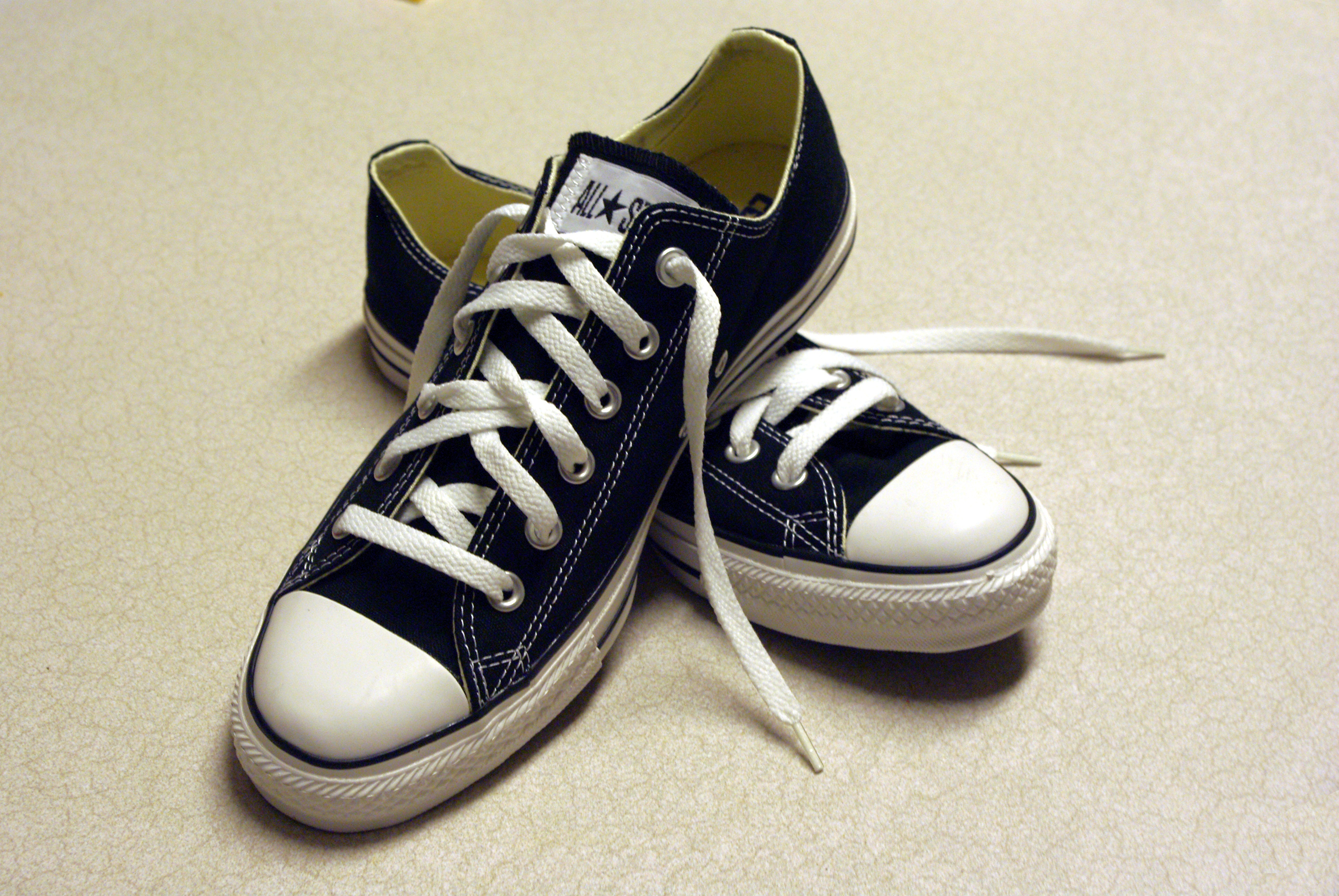
Chuck Taylor All-Stars sneakers

Chuck is a masculine given name, often a short form (hypocorism) for Charles, It may have been inspired by the Middle English word chukken. It may refer to:

== People with the given name ==
=== Arts and entertainment ===
- Chuck Alaimo, American saxophonist, leader of the Chuck Alaimo Quartet
- Chuck Baird (1947–2012), American deaf artist
- Chuck Barris (1929–2017), American TV producer
- Chuck Berry (1926–2017), American rock and roll musician
- Chuck Billy (born 1962), American thrash metal singer
- Chuck Brown (1936–2012), American guitarist and singer
- Chuck Close (1940–2021), American painter and photographer
- Chuck Comeau (born 1979), Canadian drummer
- Chuck Connors (1921–1992), American athlete and actor
- Chuck D (born 1960), stage name of Carlton Douglas Ridenhour, American rapper
- Chuck Garric, rock bassist of Alice Cooper
- Charlton Heston, "Chuck", (1923–2008), American actor and political activist
- Chuck Holmes (entrepreneur) (1945–2000), American entrepreneur and philanthropist, founded Falcon Studios
- Chuck Jackson (1937–2023), American R&B singer
- Chuck Jackson (musician) (born 1953), Canadian musician
- Chuck Jones (1912–2002), American animator, screenwriter, producer, and director of animated films
- Chuck Leavell (born 1952), American pianist and keyboardist
- Chuck Lorre (born 1952), American television writer, director, producer, composer, and production manager
- Chuck Mangione (1940–2025), American flugelhorn player and composer
- Chuck Negron (1942–2026), American singer-songwriter
- Chuck Norris (1940–2026), American martial artist, author, actor and media personality
- Chuck Palahniuk (born 1962), American novelist and freelance journalist
- Chuck Patton, African-American comics artist and animator
- Chuck Schuldiner (1967–2001), American singer, songwriter, and guitarist
- Chuck Traynor (1937–2002), American pornographer
- Charles F. Walker, American historian
- Chuck Wayne (1923–1997), American jazz guitarist
- Chuck Wein (1939–2008), American promoter and filmmaker
- Chuck E. Weiss (1945–2021), American songwriter and vocalist
- Chuck Wendig (born 1976), American writer
- Chuck Wicks (born 1979), American singer-songwriter
- Chuck Willis (1928–58), American blues singer and songwriter
- Chuck Woolery (1941–2024), American actor, singer and game show host
- Chuck Wright (born 1959), American bassist
- Chuck Zink (1925–2006), American actor
- Chuck Zito (born 1953), American actor

=== Sports ===
- Chuck Arnason (born 1951), Canadian ice hockey player
- Chuck Aoki (born 1991), American wheelchair rugby player
- Chuck Austin, American former professional wrestler
- Chuck Bennett (1907–1973), American football player and coach
- Chuck Carney (1900–1984), American football and basketball player
- Chuck Clark (born 1995), American football player
- Chuck Clements (born 1973), American football player
- Chuck Cooper (basketball) (1926–1984), American basketball player
- Chuck Detwiler (born 1947), American football player
- Chuck Dressen (1898–1966), an American third baseman, manager and coach in professional baseball
- Chuck Drulis (1918–1972), American football player and coach
- Chuck Ealey (born 1950), American Canadian football player
- Chuck Eisenmann (1918–2010), American baseball player
- Chuck Erbe (born 1944), American volleyball coach
- Chuck Fusina (born 1957), American college and professional football player
- Chuck Gelatka (1914–2001), American football player
- Chuck Hulse (1927–2020), American racing driver
- Chuck Hutchison (born 1948), American football player
- Chuck Jackson (baseball) (born 1963), American baseball player
- Chuck James (born 1981), American baseball player
- Chuck Knoblauch (born 1968), American baseball player
- Chuck Lanza (born 1964), American football player
- Chuck Lefley (1950–2026), Canadian ice hockey player
- Chuck Liddell (born 1969), American mixed martial artist and former UFC champion
- Chuck Long (born 1963), American football coach
- Chuck Mambo, English professional wrestler
- Chuck McKinley (1941–1986), American men's amateur tennis player
- Chuck Meekins (1933–1996), American racing driver
- Chuck Melton (born 1982), American wheelchair rugby player
- Chuck Noll (1932–2014), American football coach
- Chuck Osborne (American football) (1973–2012), American football player
- Chuck Palumbo (born 1971), American retired professional wrestler
- Chuck Quilter (1926–2014), American football player
- Chuck Rayner (1920–2002), Canadian hockey player
- Chuck Taylor (American football), American football player and coach
- Chuck Taylor (baseball) (1942–2018), American baseball pitcher and player
- Chuck Taylor (salesman) (1901–1969), American basketball player and shoe salesman/evangelist
- Chuck Wahl (born 1950), American racing driver
- Chuck Weatherspoon (born 1968), American football player
- Chuck Wepner (born 1939), American heavyweight boxer
- Chuck Williams (American football) (1934–2020), coach
- Chuck Williams (basketball) (born 1946), American point guard
- Chuck Zapiec (born 1949), American football player

=== Politics ===
- Chuck Cadman (1948–2005), Canadian politician and Member of Parliament (MP)
- Chuck Eaton (born 1969), American politician
- Chuck Edwards (born 1960), American politician
- Chuck Fager (born 1942), American activist, author, editor, publisher, and prominent member of the Religious Society of Friends
- Chuck Fowler (born 1939), American politician
- Chuck Graham (1965–2020), American politician
- Chuck Grassley (born 1933), senior United States senator from Iowa, serving since 1981
- Chuck Hagel (born 1946), United States Secretary of Defense, February 27, 2013 to February 13, 2015
- Chuck Quackenbush (born 1954), American politician
- Chuck Rosenberg, American attorney
- Chuck Schumer (born 1950), politician, and senior United States senator from New York, serving since 1999
- Chuck Townsend, American politician
- Chuck Wright (politician) (1919–2016), American politician

=== Other ===
- Chuck Easttom (born 1968), American computer scientist
- Chuck Hull (born 1939), inventor of 3D printing
- Chuck Testa (born 1956), American taxidermist
- Chuck Williams (author) (1915–2015), American cookbook writer, founder of Williams-Sonoma
- Chuck Wilson (pilot) (born 1953), American pilot
- Chuck Yeager (1923–2020), brigadier general in the United States Air Force and record-setting test pilot who was the first person to break the sound barrier

== Fictional characters ==
- Chuck (Stargate), from the Stargate TV series
- Chuck Bartowski, on the American TV show Chuck
- Chuck Bass, from the television series Gossip Girl
- Chuck Billy (Chuck Billy 'n' Folks), Monica's Gang and Chuck Billy 'n' Folks
- Chuck Chambers, a character from iCarly
- Charlotte "Chuck" Charles, from the TV series Pushing Daisies
- Chuck E. Cheese, an anthropomorphic restaurant mascot
- Chuck Chicken, the titular character of the Malaysian animated series of the same name
- Chuck McGill, from the American TV series Better Call Saul
- Chuck Rock, from the eponymous video game

== See also ==
- Chucky (name)
- Chucky (disambiguation)
- Chuckles (disambiguation)
- Charlie (disambiguation)
- Charley (disambiguation)
- Charles (disambiguation)
- Chuckii Booker
- Chuckey Charles
