= Chucky =

Chucky may refer to:

- Chucky (name)
- Chucky (Child's Play), a fictional character in the Child's Play franchise
  - Chucky: Slash & Dash, a 2013 video game
  - Chucky (TV series), a 2021 TV series
- Chucky madtom (Noturus crypticus), endangered fish
- Chucky, English language slang for Irish Republican, deriving from the pronunciation of their slogan "Tiocfaidh ár lá"

== See also ==
- Chuckie (disambiguation)
- Chuck (disambiguation)
- Chuki (disambiguation)
- Chuckey Charles
- Chuckyy
