= Chucky (name) =

Chucky is an English masculine given name that is a diminutive form of Charles. Notable people known by this name include the following:

== Nickname ==
- Chucky, nickname of Vassily Ivanchuk (born 1969), Ukrainian chess grandmaster
- Chucky Atkins, nickname of Kenneth Lavon Atkins (born 1974), American basketball player
- Chucky Bartolo, nickname of Andrew Bartolo (born 1993), Maltese stand-up comedian and drag queen
- Chucky Brown, nickname of Clarence Brown Jr., (born 1968), American basketball player
- Chucky Ferreyra, nickname of Facundo Ferreyra (born 1991), Argentine footballer
- Chucky Gruden, nickname of Jon Gruden (born 1963), American football coach
- Chucky Klapow, nickname of Charles Klapow (born 1980), American choreographer and dance instructor
- Chucky Lozano, nickname of Hirving Lozano (born 1995), Mexican footballer
- Chucky Mullins, nickname of Roy Lee Mullins (1969–1991), American gridiron football player
- Chucky Thompson, nickname of Carl E. Thompson, (fl. 1991–present) American hip hop/R&B record producer
- Chucky Venn or Chucky Venice, stage name of Charles Venn (born 1973), English actor
- Chucky Workclothes, nickname of Charles Ditchley (born 1984), American hip-hop artist
- Marcelo de Jesus Silva, nicknamed “Chucky”, Brazilian mass murderer

== Fictional characters ==
- Chucky (character), nickname of Charles Lee Ray in the Child's Play media franchise

== See also ==
- Chucky (disambiguation)
- Chuck
- Chuckii Booker
- Chuckey Charles
- Chucky Danger Band, former name of Paper Lions
