= Chuckie (name) =

Chuckie is a name that is commonly used as a nickname or stagename. Notable people who are referred to by this name include the following.

== Nickname ==
- Chuckie Dreyfus nickname of Charles de Joya Dreyfus (born 1974), Filipino actor born
- Chuckie Fick, nickname of Charles Joseph Fick who is known as C. J. Fick (born 1985), American baseball player
- Chuckie Keeton, nickname of Charles Adam Keeton IV (born 1993), American football player and coach
- Chuckie Merlino, nickname of Salvatore Merlino (1939–2012), American mobster
- Chuckie Miller, nickname of Charles Elliot Miller (born 1965), American football player
- Chuckie O'Brien, nickname of Charles O'Brien, longtime friend of Jimmy Hoffa, suspected of involvement in Hoffa's disappearance
- Chuckie Taylor, nickname of Charles McArther Emmanuel (born 1978), American-born Liberian politician and criminal
- Chuckie Typewriter, nickname of Charles Nicoletti (1916 - 1977), American mob hitman
- Chuckie Williams, nickname of Charles Leon Williams (born 1953), American basketball player

== Stage name ==
- Chuckie (DJ) or DJ Chuckie, stage name of Clyde Sergio Narain (born 1978), Surinamese DJ
- Chuckie Akenz (born 1986), nickname of Vietnamese-Canadian rapper whose stagename is C-A and birthname is Chuckie Nguyen
- Chuckie Campbell, stage name of Charles Edward Campbell (born 1981), American musician
- Chuckie T., a ringname of Chuck Taylor (wrestler) (born 1986), American wrestler, who was born Dustin Lee Howard

== Fictional characters ==
- Chuckie Finster, Rugrats and All Grown Up! character
- Chuckie Slott, a recurring character on Shameless
- Chuckie, a dog in the 1983 video game Chase the Chuck Wagon

== See also ==
- Chuckie (disambiguation)
- Chickie (nickname)
- Chuckii Booker
- Chucky (disambiguation)
- Chuckey Charles
