= This Is How We Do It (disambiguation) =

"This Is How We Do It" is a 1995 song by Montell Jordan.

This Is How We Do It may also refer to:

- This Is How We Do It (album), by Montell Jordan
- "This Is How We Do It" (Grey's Anatomy), a 2011 episode

== See also ==
- "This Is How We Do", a 2014 song by Katy Perry
