= Tiffany Valentine =

Child's Play character

- Child's Play character
- Tiffany as she appears in Seed of Chucky.
- First appearance: Bride of Chucky
- Created by: Don Mancini
- Portrayed by: Jennifer Tilly; Blaise Crocker (young; TV series)
- Voiced by: Jennifer Tilly

In-universe information
- Nicknames: Bride of Chucky; Tiff; Tiffany Ray; Jennifer Tilly
- Gender: Female
- Occupation: Serial killer
- Family: Chucky (husband); G.G. Caroline Cross (adopted daughter)
- Significant others: Damien (ex-boyfriend); Nica Pierce (love interest; formerly); Gina Gershon (love interest; formerly); Joe Pantoliano (love interest; formerly)
- Status: Alive
- Location: Lockport, New York; Hackensack, New Jersey; Hollywood, Los Angeles; Beverly Hills, California

Tiffany Valentine is the secondary antagonist in the Child's Play franchise. She was created by writer Don Mancini and is portrayed by Jennifer Tilly in both live-action and voice over in Bride of Chucky, Seed of Chucky, Curse of Chucky, Cult of Chucky, and the Chucky TV series. The character has subsequently been represented in various other media, including novels, video games, and comic books.

== Appearances ==
Title	Appearance
Child's Play	
Child's Play 2
Child's Play 3
Bride of Chucky	Main
Seed of Chucky	Main
Curse of Chucky	Cameo
Cult of Chucky	Supporting
Chucky	Recurring

=== Before Bride of Chucky ===
As portrayed in the television series Chucky, in 1986, Tiffany Valentine met serial killer Charles Lee Ray while at a nightclub. During a threesome with another young woman named Delilah, Tiffany found herself sexually aroused by Charles' violent tendencies. As Charles suddenly and brutally stabbed Delilah to death, he invited Tiffany to help. They became a murderous couple and Charles took on the nickname "Chucky" at her urging.

By 1988, they had moved to Chicago and committed multiple murders with the assistance of Chucky's getaway driver Eddie Captuo. However, Tiffany felt increasingly spurned by Charles abusive attitude and the fact he had begun "cheating" by murdering people without her. In a fit of anger, she called Detective Mike Norris and reported Chucky's location, leading to his death.

=== Bride of Chucky (1998) ===
In 1998, shortly after the events Child's Play 3, Tiffany bribes and murders a police officer to acquire Chucky's remains. She repairs his body and resurrects him with a voodoo spell. When Tiffany learns Chucky had no intentions of marrying her, she holds him hostage in a playpen. Chucky escapes, kills Tiffany and transfers her soul into a female doll.

Chucky explains that in order for them to transfer their souls into human host bodies, they need a magical amulet called the Heart of Damballa, which was buried with his human body in Hackensack, New Jersey. Tiffany calls and convinces her neighbor Jesse (Nick Stabile) to take the dolls to Hackensack.

With his girlfriend Jade (Katherine Heigl), Jesse takes the dolls to Hackensack, with Chucky and Tiffany killing multiple people along the way. The dolls have sex one night, unknowingly impregnating Tiffany. Chucky and Tiffany take Jesse and Jade hostage to be their new host-bodies, but Tiffany has a change of heart, feeling sympathy for Jessie and Jade, and betrays Chucky. Chucky mortally wounds her before being gunned down. Shortly after, an infant doll crawls from Tiffany's corpse, attacking a police officer.

=== Seed of Chucky (2004) ===
Sometime later, Chucky and Tiffany's gender dysphoric living-doll child (Billy Boyd) tracks their bodies down to Hollywood, where they have been rebuilt as props for a horror film. The child uses the Heart of Damballa to resurrect the pair. Realizing their child has no obvious gender, Chucky proclaims the child a boy and names him "Glen," while Tiffany insists the child is a girl and names her "Glenda."

Tiffany decides to transfer her soul into her favorite actress, Jennifer Tilly, whom Chucky artificially inseminates to create a body for Glen/Glenda. Tiffany learn that Glen/Glenda actually has two distinct personalities- the peaceful male Glen and the murderous female Glenda. Jennifer gives birth to twins, allowing both personalities to have a body of their own. When Chucky decides he doesn't want to transfer his soul into a human anymore, Tiffany leaves him. A vengeful Chucky tracks down and kills Tiffany, not realizing she had already swapped spirits with Jennifer. Glen, believing his mother dead, murders Chucky with an axe.

Five years later, Glen and Glenda have transferred their souls into Jennifer and Chucky's babies while Tiffany now masquerades as Jennifer.

=== Curse of Chucky (2013) ===
Four years later, Tiffany pays a police officer to get Chucky from evidence after Nica Pierce's trial, then murders the officer. Sometime later, she mails Chucky to Nica's niece Alice.

=== Cult of Chucky (2017) ===
Four years later, Tiffany visits Nica Pierce in a mental institution. Tiffany informs Nica that her niece Alice has died. She leaves behind a Chucky doll for Nica, claiming it was a "gift" from Alice. Tiffany later calls and taunts Andy Barclay.

Tiffany later kills a security guard outside and collects Nica, who is now possessed by Chucky after he learned a spell that allows him to split his soul into multiple hosts. As they depart in Tiffany's car, a living-doll of Tiffany is seen in the back seat, revealing that Tiffany has similarly used voodoo to split her soul into multiple hosts.

=== Chucky (TV series) ===
==== Season One ====
Sometime later, Tiffany and the Chucky-possessed Nica are on the lam and staying in a hotel in Hackensack. Nica has begun to experience lucid episodes where she is able to momentarily regain control of her body from Chucky. Tiffany reveals that she knows the truth, and has started to become obsessed with Nica and fall in love with her.

Tiffany purchases Charles Lee Ray's childhood home and helps Chucky in his plan to create an army of living dolls and spread mass chaos; Chucky is able to successfully animate dozens of bodies by corrupting Jake Wheeler's cousin Junior into murdering his father. After an argument, Tiffany reveals to one of the Chucky dolls that she was responsible for his murder, before drugging Nica. Later, Andy Barclay manages to steal a delivery truck containing most of the Chucky dolls. However, the living-doll Tiffany gets the drop on him and holds him at gunpoint.

Tiffany returns to a secret location where she is keeping Nica, who is finally waking up from being drugged. Tiffany reveals that she has chopped off Nica's arms and legs to keep the Chucky inside of her from hurting her.

==== Season Two ====
Immediately after the events of season one, Andy Barclay fatally shoots the Tiffany doll, while the human Tiffany takes Nica back to her home in Beverly Hills, California.

One year later, Tiffany awakens to find the severed head of her doll counterpart in her bed. Unbeknownst to Tiffany, Nica has been conspiring with the Chucky spirit inside of her, along with Tiffany's teenager children Glen and Glenda to escape.

Glen and Glenda arrive at the house for their birthday, having invited Gina Gershon, Joe Pantoliano, Sutton Stracke and Jennifer Tilly's real life sister, Meg Tilly for a surprise party. Following a series of mysterious murders, including Joe, Nica escapes with Glenda while Glen stays behind with Tiffany. Tiffany is distraught, and later argues with the real Jennifer Tilly, whose soul is trapped inside a Tiffany doll.

When Meg finds the real Jennifer, Tiffany kills her out of desperation, before showing Glen the original doll body they shared with Glenda. They depart to look for Glenda and Nica, bringing the doll body and Jennifer with them. Jennifer is later killed by a truck while trying to escape.

They reunite with Glenda at a Catholic Reform school. Nica, who has just had Chucky's soul exorcised from her body, tries to shoot Tiffany, only to accidentally hit Glen. As Glen lays dying in the hospital, Tiffany helps Glenda transfer both of their souls back into their original doll body. Tiffany helps give the doll, now calling itself "G.G.", a makeover before they depart off to England.

Now wanted for several murders, Tiffany attempts to get her hands on a "Wedding Belle" doll owned by Caroline Cross so she can transfer her soul into its body. Caroline, having come to view Chucky as a father-figure, flees with Tiffany and the doll despite her sister Lexy's pleas.

Three weeks later, Tiffany has taken Caroline with her to Times Square. She attempts to transfer her soul into the Wedding Belle doll, only to realize in horror that it is Chucky in disguise.

==== Season Three ====
Before Chucky has a chance to kill Tiffany, police officers break in and arrest her. Tiffany put on trial for murder and sentenced to death, while Nica is cleared for the crimes Chucky framed her for. While in jail she reveals to Lexy that Chucky has run off with Caroline. Tiffany later uses voodoo magic to control the guards and help her escape to Nica's fury, and reconciles with Chucky after a heartfelt phonecall.

Tiffany later arrives at the house of Wendell Wilkins, original creator of the Good Guy and Belle dolls, and reunites with Chucky. Caroline performs a ritual to transfer Tiffany's soul back into a Belle doll. They leave the house together with Caroline.

=== Other media ===
On the home media DVD and Blu-ray release of Seed of Chucky in 2005, a short film entitled Chucky's Vacation Slides was included in the special features. In the short, Tiffany sits alongside Chucky and Glen on a sofa in their family home, where they watch a slideshow of their holiday to various places after filming Seed of Chucky. Nearly all of these places have evidence of Chucky killing someone; this upsets Tiffany and makes Glen feel uncomfortable so they leave. Another special feature for the DVD features Tiffany and Chucky being interviewed by the Fuzion interviewer to promote the film.

Tiffany has appeared in multiple video games. She first appeared in the 2013 endless runner game titled Chucky: Slash & Dash, developed and published by Slimstown Studios for mobile. On November 28, 2023, a Chucky DLC was released for the asymmetrical horror game Dead by Daylight. It contains a Tiffany legendary skin for Chucky, with Tilly reprising her role. She later appeared as a playable character in the Call of Duty franchise with the battle royale game Call of Duty: Warzone and the first-person shooter game Call of Duty: Black Ops 6 in an event called "The Haunting" starting on October 9, 2025.

== Characteristics ==
Despite being a serial killer, Tiffany is shown to have something of a soft-side, occasionally showing remorse for victims such as Jesse and Jade, in addition to caring about her children. Conversely, she is very impulsive and can become violent and unforgiving when angered. Her emotions are often uncontrollable, resulting in extreme mood swings.
