= Chuck (disambiguation) =

Chuck is a masculine given name, often a pet form of "Charles".

Chuck may also refer to:

== Computers and technology ==
- ChucK, a programming language for computer music
- Chuck (engineering), a device for holding tools or workpieces

Air chuck for inflating tires

- Chuck, a common name for the BSD Daemon mascot

== Entertainment ==
- Chuck (Sum 41 album), 2004
- Chuck (Chuck Berry album), 2017
- Chuck (TV series), an American action-comedy
- Chuck (film), a 2016 American biographical sports drama
- Chuck, fictional character from anime series Panty & Stocking with Garterbelt

== Radio ==
- Chuck FM, branding for WAVF, Charleston, South Carolina
- Chuck FM, branding for W258CB, Greenville, South Carolina
- Chuck FM, former branding for WFZZ, Green Bay, Wisconsin

== Other uses ==
- Chuck steak, a cut of beef
- Throwing (cricket) or chucking, in the sport of cricket
- Chuck Taylor All-Stars, a shoe brand often known as "Chucks"
- Chuck or woodchuck, vernacular names of the groundhog
- Abbreviation for nunchaku, a kind of martial arts weapon

== See also ==
- Chucking (disambiguation)
