= What's on Tonight =

1997 single by Montell Jordan

Single by Montell Jordan

from the album More...
- B-side: "Superlover Man"
- Released: January 28, 1997
- Recorded: 1996
- Genre: R&B
- Length: 3:59
- Label: Def Jam
- Songwriters: Montell Jordan, Donald DeGrate, Jr.
- Producers: Montell Jordan, DeVante Swing and James Earl Jones

Montell Jordan singles chronology
| "Falling" (1996) | "What's on Tonight" (1997) | "Let's Ride" (1998) |

"What's on Tonight" is the third and final single released from Montell Jordan's second album, More.... The song was produced and written by both Jordan and Jodeci's DeVante Swing and became the third consecutive top 40 single from the album. It peaked at 21 on the Billboard Hot 100 and was certified gold on May 22, 1997 for sales of over 500,000 copies.

== Single track listing ==
=== A-Side ===
1. "What's on Tonight" (LP Version)- 3:59
2. "What's on Tonight" (T.V. Track)- 3:55

=== B-Side ===
1. "Superlover Man" (LP Version)- 3:35
2. "Superlover Man" (T.V. Track)- 3:35

== Charts and certifications ==
=== Weekly charts ===
| Chart (1997) | Peak position |
|---|---|
| US Billboard Hot 100 | 21 |
| US Hot R&B/Hip-Hop Songs (Billboard) | 7 |
| US Rhythmic Airplay (Billboard) | 37 |

=== Year-end charts ===
| Chart (1997) | Position |
|---|---|
| US Billboard Hot 100 | 76 |
| US Hot R&B/Hip-Hop Songs (Billboard) | 22 |

=== Certifications ===
| Region | Certification | Certified units/sales |
|---|---|---|
| United States (RIAA) | Gold | 600,000 |
