= Falling (Montell Jordan song) =

Single by Montell Jordan

from the album More...
- B-side: "I Like"
- Released: September 17, 1996
- Recorded: 1996
- Genre: R&B
- Length: 4:03
- Label: Def Jam
- Songwriter: Montell Jordan
- Producers: Derick "D Man" McElveen, James Earl Jones

Montell Jordan singles chronology
"I Like" (1996)	"Falling" (1996)	"What's on Tonight" (1997)

"Falling" is a song by American R&B singer and songwriter Montell Jordan, released in September 1996 by Def Jam Recordings, as the second single from his second album, More... (1996). Like the previous single, "I Like", "Falling" was co-produced by Derick "D Man" McEleveen and James Earl Jones, who sampled MC Eiht's 1993 hit "Streiht Up Menace". "Falling" is the most successful of the three singles, making it to numbers 18 and 25 on the US Billboard Hot 100 and Cash Box Top 100 charts. It was certified gold on December 3, 1996, for individual sales of 500,000 copies. The official remix featured a guest appearance from rapper, Flesh-n-Bone.

== Single track listing ==
=== A-Side ===
1. "Falling" (LP Version)
2. "Falling" (Instrumental)

=== B-Side ===
1. "I Like" (Remix)
2. "Falling" (A Cappella)

== Charts and certifications ==
=== Weekly charts ===
Chart (1996–1997)	Peak position
New Zealand (Recorded Music NZ)	15
US Billboard Hot 100	18
US Hot R&B/Hip-Hop Songs (Billboard)	8
US Rhythmic Airplay (Billboard)	23
US Cash Box Top 100	25

=== Year-end charts ===
Chart (1996)	Position
US Hot R&B/Hip-Hop Songs (Billboard)	80

Chart (1997)	Position
US Hot R&B/Hip-Hop Songs (Billboard)	76

=== Certifications ===
Region	Certification	Certified units/sales
United States (RIAA)	Gold	500,000
