= Chucking =

Chucking may refer to:

- Throwing (cricket), the act of illegally bowling in cricket
- Vomiting
- Chucking (musical technique) e.g. with string instruments, the muting of the chord, see Chop chord
- Chucking (workpiece on machine tools) e.g. on screw-making machines, see Screw machine#Automatic chucking machine

== See also ==
- Chuck (disambiguation)
