= Kesang Chuki Dorjee =

Bhutanese-American politician

- སྐལ་བཟང་ཆོས་སྐྱིད་རྡོ་རྗེ

Appointed member of the National Council of Bhutan
- Incumbent
- Assumed office 10 May 2018
- Preceded by: herself
- In office 2015–2018
- Succeeded by: herself

Personal details
- Born: 12 June 1976 (age 49) New York, United States of America

Kesang Chuki Dorjee (Dzongkha: སྐལ་བཟང་ཆོས་སྐྱིད་རྡོ་རྗེ; born 12 June 1976) is a Bhutanese politician who has been an appointed member of the National Council of Bhutan, since May 2018. Previously, she was an appointed member of the National Council of Bhutan from 2015 to 2018.
