= More... (Montell Jordan album) =

More…

Studio album by Montell Jordan
- Released: August 27, 1996
- Length: 50:19
- Labels: Def Soul; Def Jam
- Producers: Shep Crawford; Tony Dofat; Montell Jordan; Derick "D Man" McElveen; Professor Funk; DeVante Swing

Montell Jordan chronology
| This Is How We Do It (1995) | More… (1996) | Let's Ride (1998) |

Singles from More...
- 1. "I Like" Released: June 11, 1996; 2. "Falling" Released: September 17, 1996; 3. "What's on Tonight" Released: January 28, 1997

Professional ratings
Review scores
| Source | Rating |
|---|---|
| AllMusic | 2.5/5 stars |
| USA Today | 2.5/4 stars |

More… is the second studio album by American singer Montell Jordan, released on August 27, 1996 through Def Soul and Def Jam Recordings, Being the first release under the former latter. Though the album performed not as well on the US Billboard charts as his previous album, only making it to #47 on the Billboard 200, More… nevertheless was certified gold by the RIAA on May 21, 1997. The album also spawned three hit singles, "I Like", "Falling" and "What's on Tonight", the later two being certified gold by the RIAA. "Bounce 2 This" also appeared on the ending credits to The Nutty Professor.

== Track listing ==
More... track listing
| No. | Title | Writer(s) | Producer(s) | Length |
|---|---|---|---|---|
| 1. | "Non-Believers (Interlude)" (featuring Shaunta) | James Earl Jones; Maxwell Dixon; Roy Hammond | James Earl Jones; Derick "D Man" McElveen (co.) | 0:59 |
| 2. | "Superlover Man" | Montell Jordan; Jones; John Watson | Jones; McElveen (co.) | 3:37 |
| 3. | "All I Need" | Jordan; Jones; James Brown; Bill Withers; Stanley McKenny; Harry Wayne Casey; Richard Finch; Stevie Wonder | Jones; McElveen (co.) | 4:10 |
| 4. | "Tricks On My Mind" | Jordan; Erik Milteer; Tony DoFat; Richard Walters | Tony "Capone" DoFat | 4:22 |
| 5. | "Falling" | Jordan; Jones; Aaron Tyler; Terry Allen | Jones; McElveen (co.) | 4:03 |
| 6. | "What's on Tonight" | DeVante Swing; Jordan; Jones | DeVante Swing | 4:38 |
| 7. | "I Say Yes (Interlude)" | Jordan; Schappel Crawford | Schappel Crawford | 1:47 |
| 8. | "I Like" (featuring Slick Rick) | Jordan; Jones; Casey; Finch | Jones; McElveen (co.) | 4:43 |
| 9. | "Let Me Be the One (Come Runnin')" | Jordan; Crawford | Crawford | 4:51 |
| 10. | "Never Alone (Interlude)" | Jordan; Crawford; Professor Funk | Crawford | 1:46 |
| 11. | "Never Alone" | Jordan; Crawford; Professor Funk | Crawford | 5:13 |
| 12. | "Everything Is Gonna Be Alright" | Jordan; Crawford; Professor Funk | Crawford; Jordan (co.); Professor Funk (co.) | 5:05 |
| 13. | "Bounce 2 This" | Jordan; Crawford; Wonder | Jordan; Crawford | 5:13 |
| Total length: | | | | 50:19 |

Sample credits

- "Non Believers (Interlude)" contains:
  - a sample of "Impeach the President", written by Roy Hammond and performed by The Honeydrippers.
  - an interpolation of "Check It Out", written by Maxwell Dixon.
- "Superlover Man" contains a sample of "Superman Lover", written and performed by Johnny "Guitar" Watson.
- "All I Need" contains:
  - elements from "Think (About It)", written by James Brown, and performed by Lyn Collins.
  - an interpolation of "I Get Lifted", written by Harry Wayne Casey and Richard Finch.
  - an interpolation of "Who Is He (And What Is He to You)?", written by Bill Withers and Stanley McKenny.
  - an interpolation of "That Girl", written by Stevie Wonder.
- "Tricks On My Mind" contains a sample of "Mona Lisa", written by Richard Walters, and performed by Slick Rick.
- "Falling" contains an interpolation of "Streiht Up Menace", written by Aaron Tyler and Terry Allen.
- "I Like" contains a sample of "I Get Lifted", written by Harry Wayne Casey and Richard Finch, and performed by KC and the Sunshine Band.
- "Bounce 2 This" contains an interpolation of "That Girl", written by Stevie Wonder.

== Personnel ==
- David A. Belgrave - marketing

== Charts ==
=== Weekly charts ===
Weekly chart performance for More...
| Chart (1996) | Peak position |
|---|---|
| Canada Top Albums/CDs (RPM) | 23 |
| UK Albums (Official Charts) | 66 |
| UK R&B Albums (Official Charts) | 9 |
| US Billboard 200 | 47 |
| US Top R&B/Hip-Hop Albums (Billboard) | 14 |

=== Year-end charts ===
Year-end chart performance for More...
| Chart (1997) | Position |
|---|---|
| US Top R&B/Hip-Hop Albums (Billboard) | 90 |

== Certifications ==
Certifications for More...
| Region | Certification | Certified units/sales |
|---|---|---|
| United States (RIAA) | Gold | 500,000^{^} |
^{^} Shipments figures based on certification alone.
