= Victory World Church =

Coordinates: 33.92036°N 84.20311°W

Victory Church
- Victory Church ATL
- Victory Church
- Location: Norcross, Georgia
- Country: United States
- Denomination: Non-denominational
- Website: http://victoryatl.com

History
- Former name: Victory World Church
- Founded: 1990
- Founder(s): Dennis & Colleen Rouse

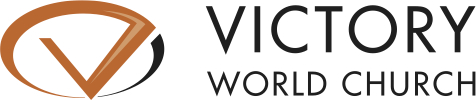
VWC Logo

Victory Church is a multi-cultural non-denominational Christian megachurch located in Norcross, Georgia.

== History ==
Victory World Church was founded in 1990, originally named as Victory World Outreach. Pastors Dennis and Colleen Rouse held the first service in their small apartment home with just six people. They moved to a daycare in Doraville before buying the current main campus location from Waffle House Corporate offices. Victory's campus in Norcross welcomes more than 20,000 people from over 140 nations each weekend. Listed 57th in 2010 by Outreach Magazine's 100 Largest Churches in America, the ministry has expanded to include church plants such as Classic City Community Church in Athens, Georgia; and additional campuses: Victory Hamilton Mill in Buford, Georgia, Victory Midtown in Atlanta, Georgia, and Victory North Cobb in Acworth, Georgia. The name of the church was shortened to "Victory Church" in early 2020 by Johnson and Summer Bowie, who took over as the senior pastors August 16, 2020.
