= Marcelo de Jesus Silva =

Brazilian serial killer

- Born: 1984; Rio de Janeiro
- Died: December 3, 2010; Lagoa da Paixão, Fazenda Coutos, Bahia, Brazil
- Cause of death: Murder
- Convictions: Murder, robbery, drug trafficking, death squad

Details
- Victims: 20
- Country: Brazil
- Locations: Pirajá, Salvador, Bahia

Marcelo de Jesus Silva, nicknamed "Chucky" was a Brazilian serial killer who killed more than 20 people along with his group. Other than murder, he was accused of robbery, drug trafficking, and death squad. As he was a diminutive 1.28m in height, he was nicknamed "Chucky" and "Pigmeu" (pygmy).

== Crimes ==
According to Delegacia de Homicídios, Jesus Silva had more than 20 murders in his criminal history, with a further criminal history and records from police stations from Ilhéus and Mata de São João and from Grupo Especial de Repressão to Crimes de Extermínio (former Gerce) and Delegacia de Furtos e Roubos. Still according to Delegacia de Homicídios, Jesus Silva was the right-arm of drug trafficker João Teixeira Leal, aka Jão, one of Pirajá's most prolific drug traffickers.

In March 2007, Jão's death squad, composed of seven men, were captured by Gerce. They committed a triple homicide in Alto do Cabrito, Salvador. The killed were 40-year-old Junê Péricles dos Santos Santana, 26-year-old Igor Leonardo Cruz da Silva and Joílson dos Santos Santana, all of whom were involved in drug trafficking. The three were killed in public highway. They committed the homicides in 2006. The crime was witnessed by relatives of the victims, who provided the first clues to the perpetrators.

== Death ==
Jesus Silva was killed by rival traffickers on December 3, 2010, in Lagoa da Paixão. He had his arms severed, his face disfigured by wood blows. His body was hanging from the head in a trash container. Police suspected that Jesus Silva was killed after he practiced robberies in that region. On December 29, 2011, one of the men accused of killing Jesus Silva, Fabio Cebola, was arrested by police.

== Police tales involving Jesus Silva ==
One time, to escape police arrest, Jesus Silva hid himself in the housing of a public telephone. Jesus Silva also fired a sub-machine gun from atop the shoulders of a taller accomplice. On one occasion, during a police investigation in a morro (a hill, or favela) in Salvador, several teams were attempting to capture a bandit. By radio, police officers communicated about the operation and the warning that the bandit walked off the morro. Jesus Silva had eluded the police. When the police officers were discussing if the criminal had escaped, one of the officers said: "Only a dwarf has walked". Another police officer responded: "The dwarf was the man!", but Jesus Silva had already escaped.

== See also ==
- List of serial killers by country
- List of serial killers by number of victims
