= Somethin' 4 da Honeyz =

1995 single by Montell Jordan

Single by Montell Jordan

from the album This Is How We Do It
- B-side: "This Is How We Do It"
- Released: July 25, 1995
- Length: 4:36
- Label: Def Jam; PMP; Rush Associated Labels
- Songwriters: Montell Jordan; Oji Pierce; Mark Alton; Robert E. Bell; Ronald N. Bell; George M. Brown; Robert "Spike" Mickens; Doug Rasheed; Claydes Smith; Dennis Thomas; Richard Westfield
- Producer: Oji Pierce

Montell Jordan singles chronology
| "This Is How We Do It" (1995) | "Somethin' 4 da Honeyz" (1995) | "I Like" (1996) |

Music video
- "Somethin' 4 da Honeyz" on YouTube

"Somethin' 4 da Honeyz" is the second single released from American singer-songwriter Montell Jordan's debut album, This Is How We Do It (1995). Produced by Oji Pierce, the song was the follow-up to Montell's number-one hit, "This Is How We Do It" and was released in July 1995. It became his second consecutive hit, peaking at number 21 on both the US Billboard Hot 100 and Cash Box Top 100 charts, and was certified gold by the Recording Industry Association of America (RIAA) in September 1995 for shipments of over 500,000 copies. The official remix entitled the "Human Rhythm Remix" was produced by Derrick Edmondson and featured an appearance by Redman. Both the original and remix had promotional music videos released.

== Critical reception ==
Neil Kulkarni from Melody Maker said, "This is all slick and well, but the saving grace of 'This Is How...' was that bassline, and this one doesn't even compete." Pan-European magazine Music & Media wrote, "Let the magic Jordans tell you once more how they do it. They simply have got more swing than comparable R&B outfits, while they never lose sight of the melody. The beat is bumpin'!"

== Track listing ==
- US 12-inch single

A1. "Somethin' 4 da Honeyz" (radio version) – 4:02
A2. "Somethin' 4 da Honeyz" (Human Rhythm remix) – 3:57
A3. "Somethin' 4 da Honeyz" (Human Rhythm instrumental) – 3:57
B1. "This Is How We Do It" (Studio Ton radio mix) – 3:42
B2. "This Is How We Do It" (Funkmaster Flex radio mix) – 4:33
B3. "This Is How We Do It" (Puff Daddy radio mix) – 4:23

== Charts ==
=== Weekly charts ===
| Chart (1995) | Peak position |
|---|---|
| Australia (ARIA) | 19 |
| Canada Retail Singles (The Record) | 23 |
| Europe (Eurochart Hot 100) | 74 |
| Europe (European Dance Radio) | 8 |
| Netherlands (Dutch Top 40 Tipparade) | 14 |
| Netherlands (Single Top 100 Tipparade) | 8 |
| New Zealand (Recorded Music NZ) | 8 |
| Scottish Singles Sales (Official Charts) | 63 |
| UK Singles (Official Charts) | 15 |
| UK Dance (Official Charts) | 7 |
| UK Hip Hop/R&B (Official Charts) | 2 |
| US Billboard Hot 100 | 21 |
| US Hot R&B Singles (Billboard) | 18 |
| US Maxi-Singles Sales (Billboard) | 5 |
| US Top 40/Rhythm-Crossover (Billboard) | 15 |
| US Cash Box Top 100 | 21 |

=== Year-end charts ===
| Chart (1995) | Position |
|---|---|
| Australia (ARIA) | 98 |
| US Hot R&B Singles (Billboard) | 98 |

== Certifications ==
| Region | Certification | Certified units/sales |
|---|---|---|
| United States (RIAA) | Gold | 500,000^{^} |
^{^} Shipments figures based on certification alone.

== Release history ==
| Region | Date | Format(s) | Label(s) | Ref(s). |
|---|---|---|---|---|
| United States | July 25, 1995 | Rhythmic contemporary radio; 12-inch vinyl; CD; cassette | Def Jam; PMP; Rush Associated Labels | |
| United Kingdom | August 21, 1995 | 12-inch vinyl; CD; cassette | Def Jam; PMP; Island | |
| Australia | September 18, 1995 | CD; cassette | Def Jam; PMP; Rush Associated Labels; Island | |
