= Chuckie =

Chuckie may refer to:

- Chuckie (name)
- Chuckie (DJ), Surinamese DJ, rapper and producer
- "Chuckie", a track on the 1991 album We Can't Be Stopped by Geto Boys
- Chuckie Egg, a 1983 home computer video game
  - Chuckie Egg 2, its 1985 sequel

== See also ==
- Chucky (disambiguation)
- "Chuck E.'s in Love", 1979 Rickie Lee Jones song
