= Chucky: Slash & Dash =

2013 video game

- Developer: Slimstown Studios
- Publisher: Slimstown Studios
- Platform: iOS
- Release: WW: November 1, 2013; discontinued 3/4/15
- Genre: Endless runner
- Mode: Single-player

Chucky: Slash & Dash is a 2013 endless runner video game by American developer Slimstown Studios and published by Universal Studios. The game was originally slated to be released for both iOS and Android devices on November 1, 2013, and was discontinued on March 4, 2015. but was ultimately released only for iOS.

Slash & Dash is the first video game to feature Chucky and Tiffany, the main antagonists of the Child's Play franchise. The game received relatively little media coverage, and reviews were mainly negative.

== Gameplay ==
Chucky about to kill a security guard from behind. Often the camera will switch to the front of the player character, unlike in traditional endless runners, where it is always behind or to the side of them.

The player can control either Chucky or Tiffany, although the gameplay mechanics are identical no matter which character is used.

Gameplay is similar to traditional endless runners a la Temple Run. To move the player left or right to collect batteries or avoid objects, the player moves their finger slightly in the desired direction on the touchscreen. To make a sharp turn to the left or right, the player swipes across the screen in the corresponding direction. To jump, the player swipes upwards; to slide, the player swipes downwards.

For the most part, the camera is situated behind the character as they run through a factory producing "Good Guy" dolls and attempting to avoid various environmental hazards, such as conveyor belts, forklifts, acid pools, barrels and other obstacles. Occasionally the camera moves around to the front of the character as they attempt to avoid objects approaching them from behind. An important element of the game is the ability to execute security guards patrolling the factory. Players can use various weapons to do so; a knife (default weapon), a cleaver, a screwdriver, or a hammer. Instead of coins, the player collects batteries, which can then be used to purchase in-game items or power-ups.

== Reception ==
Reception

Aggregate score
Aggregator	Score
GameRankings	40.00%

Review scores
Publication	Score
Starburst	3/10
TouchArcade	2/5

Chucky: Slash & Dash received negative reviews. It holds an aggregate score of 40% on GameRankings.

Starburst's Joel Harley scored the game 3 out of 10, writing: "Not only is Slash & Dash ugly, unimaginative and derivative of better games, but it's glitchy and impossibly difficult too. Gameplay is identical to other Temple Run games, except in this case, it doesn't work. It's unresponsive, annoying and a mess". He was especially critical of the lack of response of the controls: "At times, it feels like it's at complete random whether Chucky decides to respond to your touch, often choosing simply to run into a wall or right into that security guard you were trying to cut up".

TouchArcade's Danny Gallagher was also critical, finding similar problems with the controls and scoring the game 2 out of 5. He wrote "the problem is that the execution of the game is really lousy ... the movement feels wooden and not as responsive as it should be. This is especially difficult when you're trying to sneak up on a guard and stab him since it requires two swipes and it so poorly responds to just one".
