= Life After Def =

Studio album by Montell Jordan
- Released: October 21, 2003
- Recorded: 2002–2003
- Genre: R&B
- Label: Koch; Enterprise
- Producer: Montell Jordan; Jor Ja Black

Montell Jordan chronology
| Montell Jordan (2002) | Life After Def (2003) | Let It Rain (2008) |

Singles from Life After Def
- 1. "Supa Star" Released: August 13, 2003; 2. "Bottom Line" Released: December 10, 2003; 3. "I'm Going Krazy (Straight Bananas)" Released: March 10, 2004

Professional ratings
Review scores
| Source | Rating |
|---|---|
| Allmusic | link |

Life After Def is the sixth studio album released by American singer Montell Jordan. It was released on October 21, 2003 for Koch Entertainment and The Interprise Inc, marking his first project not to be released for Def Jam Recordings. Chiefly produced by Jordan and Jor Ja Blac, it peaked at number 54 on the US Billboard Top R&B/Hip-Hop Albums and number 30 on the Independent Albums chart. The album was preceded by the single "Supa Star" which reached number 71 on the Hot R&B/Hip-Hop Singles & Tracks.

== Track listing ==
All songs produced by JorJa Black.

| No. | Title | Writer(s) | Length |
|---|---|---|---|
| 1. | "Big Man's Back" | Montell Jordan; James E. Jones; Percell Holmes | 2:11 |
| 2. | "Aight" | Jordan; Jones; Holmes; Leandre T. Abraham | 4:14 |
| 3. | "True" | Jordan; Jones; Holmes | 3:22 |
| 4. | "I'm Going Krazy (Straight Bananas)" | Jordan; Jones; Holmes; Hamilton Bohannon | 3:31 |
| 5. | "Supa Star" | Jordan; Jones; Holmes | 4:01 |
| 6. | "Bottom Line" | Jordan; Jones; Holmes | 4:42 |
| 7. | "What If I Never" (featuring Tichina Arnold) | Jordan; Jones; Holmes | 4:42 |
| 8. | "Crushin'" | Jordan; Jones; Holmes; Abraham | 4:17 |
| 9. | "Make Up Sex" | Jordan; Jones; Holmes | 4:58 |
| 10. | "Denise Interlude" | | 1:40 |
| 11. | "Denise" | Jordan; Jones; Holmes | 4:03 |
| 12. | "Questions" | Jordan; Jones; Holmes | 3:54 |
| 13. | "Yes" (featuring Tonex) | Jordan; Jones; Anthony Williams; Holmes | 3:55 |
| 14. | "We Ride on Dem Thangs" (Bonus track) | Jordan; Jones; Abraham; Holmes | 4:19 |

Sample credits

- "I'm Going Krazy (Straight Bananas)" contains a sample from "Singing a Song for Mother" by Hamilton Bohannon.

== Charts ==
| Chart (2003) | Peak position |
|---|---|
| US Top R&B/Hip-Hop Albums (Billboard) | 54 |
