= Montell Jordan (album) =

Studio album by Montell Jordan
- Released: February 26, 2002
- Length: 57:02
- Label: Def Soul
- Producers: Montell Jordan; Steven Estiverne; Focus; Rob Fusari; Invisible Man; Falonte Moore; Travon Potts

Montell Jordan chronology
| Get It On…Tonite (1999) | Montell Jordan (2002) | Life After Def (2003) |

Singles from Montell Jordan
- 1. "You Must Have Been" Released: December 18, 2001

Montell Jordan is the fifth studio album by American singer Montell Jordan. It was released by Def Soul on February 26, 2002 in the United States. It was his last album with Def Jam.

== Critical reception ==
Professional ratings
Review scores
| Source | Rating |
|---|---|
| AllMusic | 3/5 stars |
| USA Today | 3/4 stars |

AllMusic editor Jason Birchmeier rated the album three out of five stars. He noted that with Montell Jordan, the singer "finally made an album for himself rather than for his fans [...] This is a more introspective and sincere album than Jordan's past few efforts, justifying its eponymous title and worthy of the respect the vocalist hasn't been able to earn throughout his career. There aren't any big-name collaborations, and Jordan thankfully doesn't delve into pop-rap like he did on past albums in an effort to score crossover success." Entertainment Weekly's Tom Sinclair found that its "it’s hard to maintain cred in two different worlds, but in his self-titled album, Cali coolster Montell Jordan shifts from post-Isley Brothers love-man slow jams to boastful hip-hop joints with convincing ease."

== Track listing ==
| No. | Title | Writer(s) | Producer(s) | Length |
|---|---|---|---|---|
| 1. | "MJ V Intro" (featuring WC) | Montell Jordan; Bernard Edwards, Jr.; Kaisha Jones | Focus | 1:30 |
| 2. | "MJ Anthem" | Jordan; Edwards; Brad Williams | Focus | 3:56 |
| 3. | "You're the Right One" | Jordan; Steven Estiverne; Edwards; James Jones | Jordan; Estiverne | 4:04 |
| 4. | "You Must Have Been" | Jordan; Estiverne; K. Jones; J. Jones | Estiverne | 3:57 |
| 5. | "Can't Take It No More" | Jordan; Estiverne; Kristin Jordan; J. Jones | Invisible Man; J. Jones | 4:26 |
| 6. | "Top or Bottom" | Jordan; Edwards | Focus | 1:09 |
| 7. | "Tasty" | Jordan; Estiverne; Edwards | Jordan; Estiverne | 3:50 |
| 8. | "Mine Mine Mine" | Jordan; Edwards; Jason Weaver | Focus | 4:07 |
| 9. | "Coulda Woulda Shoulda" (featuring Case) | Jordan; Falonte Moore; Rob Fusari; Balewa Muhammad | Moore; Fusari | 4:19 |
| 10. | "Why Can't We" | Jordan; Edwards | Focus | 8:17 |
| 11. | "The Rain" | Jordan; Edwards | Focus | 6:34 |
| 12. | "Are You With Me" | Jordan; Travon Potts | Potts | 4:41 |
| 13. | "The You in Me" (featuring Bishop Eddie Long) | Jordan; Estiverne; Long | Jordan; Estiverne | 6:00 |
| Total length: | | | | 57:02 |

== Charts ==
Weekly chart performance for Montell Jordan
| Chart (2002) | Peak position |
|---|---|
| Dutch Albums (Album Top 100) | 63 |
| French Albums (SNEP) | 90 |
| German Albums (Offizielle Top 100) | 35 |
| Swiss Albums (Schweizer Hitparade) | 69 |
| UK Albums (Official Charts) | 175 |
| UK R&B Albums (Official Charts) | 27 |
