= Let It Rain (Montell Jordan album) =

Studio album by Montell Jordan
- Released: October 21, 2008
- Recorded: 2007–2008
- Genre: R&B
- Label: Native, Universal, Fontana
- Producer: James E. Jones, Kristin Hudson, Montell Jordan, Chuckey Charles

Montell Jordan chronology
Life After Def (2003)	Let It Rain (2008)	Masterpeace (2019)

Singles from Let It Rain
- 1. "Not No More" Released: August 25, 2008; 2. "Me and U" Released: September 13, 2008

Professional ratings
Review scores
Source	Rating
Allmusic	3/5 stars

Let It Rain is the seventh studio album by Montell Jordan. It was released by Native Records on October 21, 2008 in the United States. The first single and music video from the album is "Not No More" featuring Cignature. The video was released on September 23, 2008 through a live vlog-cast hosted by Montell Jordan himself and followed by the release of the video exclusively on YouTube. Let It Rain peaked at # 67 on the Top R&B/Hip-Hop Albums, while the single, "Me and U" made it to #71 on the Hot R&B/Hip-Hop Singles & Tracks. It was his last before he went on to become a minister.

== Track listing ==
1. Let It Rain
2. Left Alone (feat. Doug E. Fresh)
3. Can't Live Without You
4. Me and U
5. Stay With Me
6. I Like (The Way)
7. I Need A Girl
8. Not No More (feat. Cignature)
9. I Cried
10. Your Love (Crazy 4 You)
11. Comatose (Intro)
12. Comatose
13. This Is How We Roll

== Charts ==
Chart (2008)	Peak position
US Top R&B/Hip-Hop Albums (Billboard)	67
