= I Like (Montell Jordan song) =

Single by Montell Jordan featuring Slick Rick

from the album The Nutty Professor and More...
- A-side: "Falling"
- B-side: "Come Around"
- Released: June 11, 1996
- Genre: R&B, hip hop soul
- Length: 4:44
- Label: Def Jam
- Songwriters: Montell Jordan, Ricky Waters
- Producers: Derick "D Man" McElveen, James Earl Jones

Montell Jordan singles chronology
"Somethin' 4 da Honeyz" (1995)	"I Like" (1996)	"Falling" (1996)

Slick Rick singles chronology
"Sittin' in My Car" (1995)	"I Like" (1996)	"Got to Give It Up" (1996)

Music video
- "I Like" on YouTube

"I Like" is a song by American R&B singer and songwriter Montell Jordan and British-American rapper Slick Rick, that appeared both on Montell's second album, More... (1996) and the Nutty Professor soundtrack. Co-produced by Derick "D Man" McElveen and James Earl Jones, and released in June 1996 by Def Jam Recordings, "I Like" became a hit in both the US and UK. It peaked at numbers 16 and 28 on the US Cash Box Top 100 and Billboard Hot 100 charts, and at number 24 on the UK Singles Chart. "I Like" was also Slick Rick's first single since his release from prison.

== Single track listing ==
=== A-Side ===
1. "I Like" (LP Version)- 4:44
2. "I Like" (Radio Edit)- 4:10

=== B-Side ===
1. "I Like" (TV track)- 4:44
2. "I Like" (A Cappella)- 4:44
3. "Come Around"- 3:55 (Dos of Soul)

== Charts ==
=== Weekly charts ===
Chart (1996)	Peak position
New Zealand (Recorded Music NZ)	9
Scottish Singles Sales (Official Charts)	79
UK Singles (Official Charts)	24
UK Dance (Official Charts)	5
UK Hip Hop/R&B (Official Charts)	6
US Billboard Hot 100	28
US Hot R&B/Hip-Hop Songs (Billboard)	11
US Rhythmic Airplay (Billboard)	20
US Cash Box Top 100	16

=== Year-end charts ===
Chart (1996)	Position
US Hot R&B/Hip-Hop Songs (Billboard)	62
