= Chucky (TV series) =

2021 American horror television series

- Genre: Horror comedy; Drama; Slasher; Absurdist humor
- Created by: Don Mancini
- Based on: Characters created by Don Mancini
- Showrunner: Don Mancini
- Starring: Zackary Arthur; Björgvin Arnarson; Alyvia Alyn Lind; Teo Briones; Devon Sawa; Brad Dourif
- Music by: Joseph LoDuca
- Country of origin: United States
- Original language: English
- No. of seasons: 3
- No. of episodes: 24

Production
- Executive producers: Jeff Renfroe; Harley Peyton; Alex Hedlund; Nick Antosca; David Kirschner; Don Mancini
- Producers: Mallory Westfall; Alex Delyle; Nick Zigler; Mitch Engel; Todd Copps; Hartley Gorenstein
- Production locations: Toronto, Ontario, Canada
- Cinematography: Colin Hoult; Christopher Soos
- Editors: Randy Bricker; Lisa Grootenboer; Ken Ramos; Shiran Carolyn Amir; Thom Newell; Alex Lamb
- Running time: 41–54 minutes
- Production companies: Pheidippides; David Kirschner Productions; Eat the Cat; Universal Content Productions

Original release
- Network: Syfy; USA Network
- Release: October 12, 2021 – May 1, 2024

Related
- Cult of Chucky

Chucky is an American horror comedy television series created by Don Mancini based on the Child's Play franchise. It serves as a direct sequel to the film Cult of Chucky, the seventh installment of the series. The series features an ensemble cast led by Brad Dourif reprising his role as the voice of the title character, alongside Zackary Arthur, Björgvin Arnarson, Alyvia Alyn Lind, Teo Briones, and Devon Sawa. The cast also includes Fiona Dourif, Alex Vincent, Christine Elise, Jennifer Tilly, and Billy Boyd reprising their roles from previous films.

Developed for Syfy and USA Network, the series follows Chucky as he commits a series of mysterious murders in Hackensack, New Jersey. Series creator Mancini and producer David Kirschner both serve as executive producers for the series, alongside Nick Antosca, Alex Hedlund and Jeff Renfroe. The series premiered simultaneously on Syfy and the USA Network on October 12, 2021. It has received generally positive reviews from critics. In November 2021, the series was renewed for a second season, which premiered on October 5, 2022. In January 2023, the series was renewed for a third season, which premiered on October 4, 2023, and was aired in two parts, with the second half premiering on April 10, 2024. In September 2024, Chucky was canceled after three seasons.

== Plot ==
In the city of Hackensack, New Jersey, 14-year-old Jake Wheeler buys a Good Guy doll at a yard sale to use it in his contemporary art project during the Halloween season. He later discovers that the doll is possessed by the soul of serial killer Charles Lee Ray, known as Chucky. Jake soon becomes a suspect in a series of strange events involving the doll, who unleashes a wave of shocking murders around the town. Some of the boy's classmates will also see themselves linked to these events. In addition, a series of flashbacks explores Charles's past as a seemingly normal kid who somehow became one of Hackensack's most notorious killers.

Starring mostly teenagers and advertised as a "coming of rage" story, the series tackles themes of sexuality, bullying, domestic life, and murder. Jake is prompted to homicidal acts by the doll while also struggling with his crush on classmate Devon and other issues that arise from being gay in unaccepting environments.

== Cast and characters ==
=== Main ===
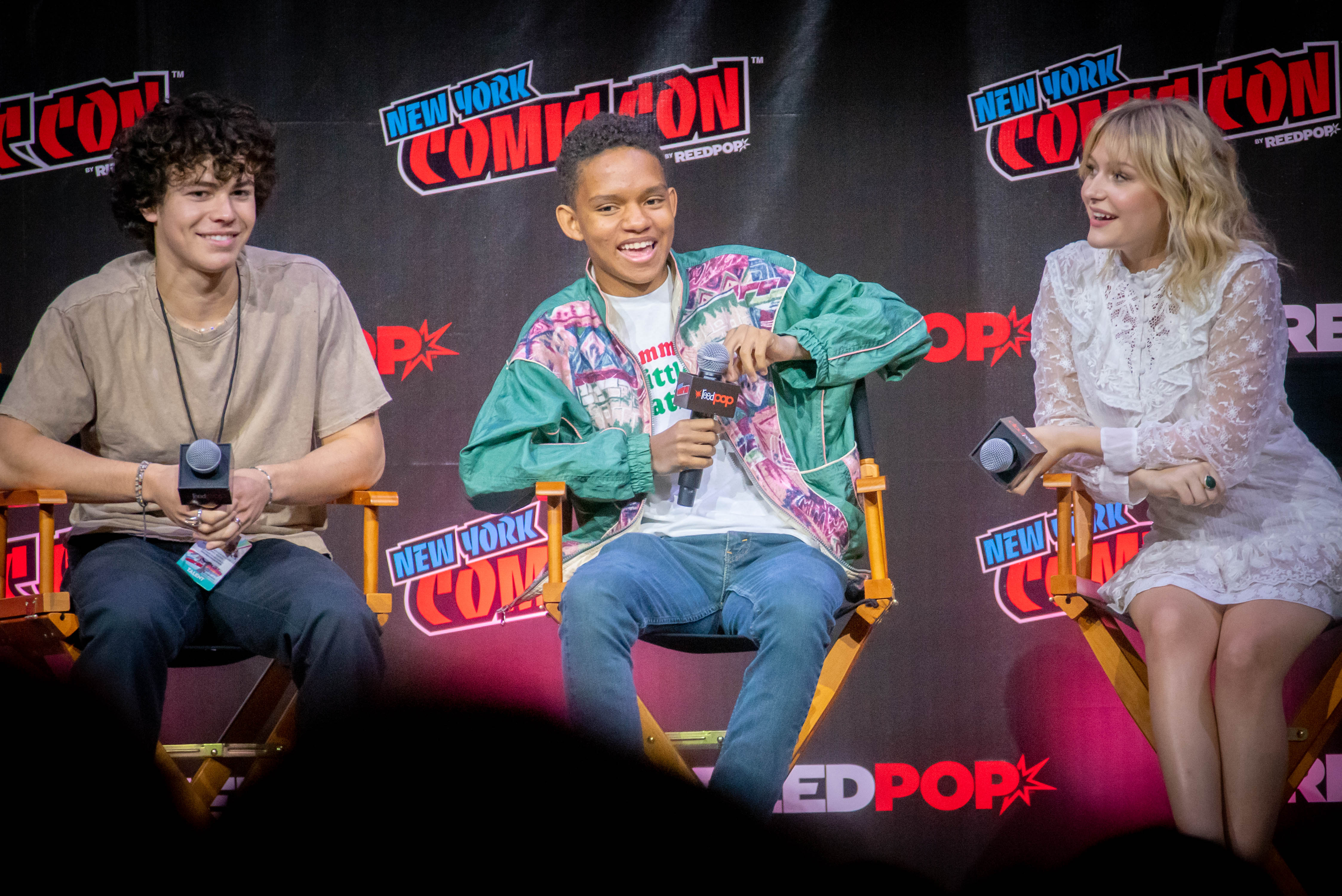
The series' three main teenage actors. From left to right: Zackary Arthur as Jake Wheeler, Björgvin Arnarson as Devon Evans, and Alyvia Alyn Lind as Lexy Cross.

- Zackary Arthur as Jake Wheeler, a teenager who purchases Chucky at a yard sale and is then menaced by him. Chucky attempts to convince Jake to kill his bully, Lexy. However, he goes against Chucky and instead works with her and Devon, his crush turned boyfriend, to take down Chucky.
- Björgvin Arnarson as Devon Evans, Jake's classmate who hosts a true crime podcast and frequently speaks about Charles Lee Ray. Later, he becomes Jake's boyfriend.
- Alyvia Alyn Lind as Lexy Cross, Jake's classmate, who starts out as a school bully, but becomes friends with him and Devon after being attacked by Chucky and learning he is alive
- Teo Briones as Junior Wheeler (season 1), Jake's antagonistic cousin and Lexy's ex-boyfriend, who is forced into track by his dad
- Devon Sawa as:
  - Lucas Wheeler (guest, seasons 1, 3), Jake's father
  - Logan Wheeler (recurring, season 1), Jake's uncle, Lucas' twin brother
  - Father Bryce (recurring, season 2), the headmaster at the Catholic School of the Incarnate Lord
  - James Collins (season 3), the President of the United States
  - Randall Jenkins (season 3), a decoy who looks exactly like Collins
- Brad Dourif as Chucky / Charles Lee Ray, a vicious serial killer who, before dying, transferred his soul into a "Good Guy" doll. Dourif also appears as Charles Lee Ray's ghost and voiced Damballa, a god of voodoo mythology who abandons Chucky.

=== Recurring ===
- Lexa Doig as Bree Wheeler (season 1), Jake's aunt
- Barbara Alyn Woods as Michelle Cross (season 1; guest season 2), Lexy's mother and Hackensack's mayor
- Michael Therriault as:
  - Nathan Cross (season 1), Lexy's father, and Michelle's husband. Therriault previously portrayed Dr. Foley in Cult of Chucky.
  - Spencer Rhodes (season 3), the Vice President of the United States
- Rachelle Casseus as Kim Evans (season 1), Devon's mother; a Hackensack detective
- Carina London Battrick as Caroline Cross (season 1; guest season 2–3), Lexy's younger sister
- Fiona Dourif as:
  - Nica Pierce, a paraplegic woman who, since the events of Cult of Chucky, has been possessed by Chucky
  - Chucky / Charles Lee Ray, a vicious serial killer who possessed the body of Nica Pierce. Dourif also portrays Charles Lee Ray in 1980s flashbacks and in the spirit realm, with Brad Dourif providing his voice.
- Jennifer Tilly as Tiffany Valentine, Chucky's lover and partner in crime who possessed the body of actress Jennifer Tilly. Tilly also voices her doll form that originated in Bride of Chucky and, in the second season, voices herself as an actress whose soul was transferred into a doll when Tiffany possessed her body.
- Christine Elise as Kyle (season 1–2), Andy's older foster sister
- Alex Vincent as Andy Barclay, Chucky's original owner and archenemy, who has been tormented by him since 1988
- David Kohlsmith as young Charles Lee Ray as 7 years old (season 1, guest season 2–3)
- Tyler Barish as young Charles Lee Ray as 14 years old (guest, season 1–3)
- Blaise Crocker as young Tiffany Valentine (season 1), from 1980s flashbacks
- Rosemary Dunsmore as Amanda Mixter (season 1–2), Bree's and the Cross' therapist, who has connections to Chucky
- Annie M. Briggs as Ms. Fairchild (seasons 1, 3; guest season 2), the school's biology teacher
- Lara Jean Chorostecki as:
  - Sister Ruth (season 2), a nun at the Catholic School of the Incarnate Lord
  - Charlotte Collins (season 3), the First Lady of the United States
- Bella Higginbotham as Nadine (season 2), Lexy's roommate at the Catholic School of the Incarnate Lord
- Andrea Carter as Sister Catherine (season 2), a nun and teacher at the Catholic School of the Incarnate Lord
- Lachlan Watson as:
  - Glen Tilly (season 2), Chucky and Tiffany's non-binary child
  - Glenda Tilly (season 2), Chucky and Tiffany's non-binary child
- Jackson Kelly as Grant Collins (season 3), the older son of the President and First Lady
- Callum Vinson as Henry Collins (season 3), the younger son of the President and First Lady
- Ayesha Mansur Gonsalves as Melanie Spiegel (season 3), the White House press secretary
- Gil Bellows as Warren Pryce (season 3), a government agent
- K.C. Collins as Coop (season 3), a Secret Service agent
- Franco Lo Presti as Hicks (season 3), a Secret Service agent assigned to guard Grant

=== Special guest stars ===
- Gina Gershon as herself (season 2)
- Joe Pantoliano as himself (season 2)
- Sutton Stracke as herself (season 2)
- Meg Tilly as herself (season 2)
- Liv Morgan as herself (season 2)
- Billy Boyd as the voice of G.G. Valentine (season 2), the combined minds of Glen and Glenda in doll form. Boyd reprises his role from Seed of Chucky.
- Kenan Thompson as cab driver (season 3)
- Richard Waugh as Dr. Rosen (season 3)
- Sarah Sherman as Annie Gilpin (season 3)
- Nia Vardalos as Evelyn Elliot (season 3)
- John Waters as Wendell Wilkins (season 3)

== Episodes ==
=== Series overview ===
Season	Episodes		Originally released	
Season	Episodes		First released	Last released
1	8		October 12, 2021	November 30, 2021
2	8		October 5, 2022	November 23, 2022
3	8	4	October 4, 2023	October 25, 2023
3	8	4	April 10, 2024	May 1, 2024

=== Season 1 (2021) ===
No. overall	No. in season	Title	Directed by	Written by	Original release date	U.S. viewers (millions)
1	1	"Death by Misadventure"	Don Mancini	Don Mancini	October 12, 2021	0.457 (SY); 0.358 (USN)
2	2	"Give Me Something Good to Eat"	Dermott Downs	Harley Peyton & Don Mancini	October 19, 2021	0.390 (SY); 0.280 (USN)
3	3	"I Like to Be Hugged"	Dermott Downs	Nick Zigler & Sarah Acosta	October 26, 2021	0.330 (SY); 0.352 (USN)
4	4	"Just Let Go"	Leslie Libman	Mallory Westfall & Kim Garland	November 2, 2021	0.282 (SY); 0.302 (USN)
5	5	"Little Little Lies"	Leslie Libman	Harley Peyton & Rachael Paradis	November 9, 2021	0.252 (SY); 0.265 (USN)
6	6	"Cape Queer"	Samir Rehem	Nick Zigler & Sarah Acosta	November 16, 2021	0.378 (SY); 0.278 (USN)
7	7	"Twice the Grieving, Double the Loss"	Samir Rehem	Mallory Westfall & Isabella Gutierrez	November 23, 2021	0.350 (SY); 0.348 (USN)
8	8	"An Affair to Dismember"	Jeff Renfroe	Don Mancini & Harley Peyton	November 30, 2021	0.296 (SY); 0.313 (USN)

=== Season 2 (2022) ===
No. overall	No. in season	Title	Directed by	Written by	Original release date	U.S. viewers (millions)
9	1	"Halloween II"	Jeff Renfroe	Don Mancini	October 5, 2022	0.355 (SY); 0.320 (USN)
10	2	"The Sinners Are Much More Fun"	Samir Rehem	Mallory Westfall & Don Mancini	October 12, 2022	0.219 (SY); 0.209 (USN)
11	3	"Hail Mary!"	Samir Rehem	Nick Zigler & Rachael Paradis	October 19, 2022	0.272 (SY); 0.239 (USN)
12	4	"Death on Denial"	Don Mancini	Alex Delyle & Kim Garland	October 26, 2022	0.224 (SY); 0.255 (USN)
13	5	"Doll on Doll"	Leslie Libman	Mallory Westfall & Isabella Gutierrez	November 2, 2022	0.227 (SY); 0.249 (USN)
14	6	"He Is Risen Indeed"	Leslie Libman	Alex Delyle & Kim Garland	November 9, 2022	0.227 (SY); 0.246 (USN)
15	7	"Goin' to the Chapel"	John Hyams	Nick Zigler & Amanda Blanchard	November 16, 2022	0.130 (SY); 0.230 (USN)
16	8	"Chucky Actually"	Jeff Renfroe	Alex Delyle & Mallory Westfall & Don Mancini	November 23, 2022	0.138 (SY); 0.244 (USN)

=== Season 3 (2023–24) ===
No. overall	No. in season	Title	Directed by	Written by	Original release date	U.S. viewers (millions)
Part 1
17	1	"Murder at 1600"	Jeff Renfroe	Nick Zigler & Don Mancini	October 4, 2023	0.172 (SY); 0.207 (USN)
18	2	"Let the Right One In"	John Hyams	Catherine Schetina & Amanda Blanchard and Alex Delyle & Rachael Paradis	October 11, 2023	0.124 (SY); 0.261 (USN)
19	3	"Jennifer's Body"	John Hyams	Alex Delyle & Rachael Paradis and Catherine Schetina & Amanda Blanchard	October 18, 2023	0.210 (SY); 0.230 (USN)
20	4	"Dressed to Kill"	Jeff Renfroe	Rachael Paradis & Don Mancini	October 25, 2023	0.105 (SY); 0.247 (USN)
Part 2
21	5	"Death Becomes Her"	Samir Rehem	Nick Zigler & Amanda Blanchard & Diana Pawell	April 10, 2024	0.153 (SY); 0.228 (USN)
22	6	"Panic Room"	Samir Rehem	Alex Delyle & Isabella Gutierrez & Amanda Blanchard	April 17, 2024	0.140 (SY); 0.176 (USN)
23	7	"There Will Be Blood"	Amanda Row	Catherine Schetina & Josh E. Jacobs	April 24, 2024	0.072 (SY); 0.176 (USN)
24	8	"Final Destination"	Jeff Renfroe	Alex Delyle & Nick Zigler & Don Mancini	May 1, 2024	0.077 (SY); 0.116 (USN)

== Production ==
=== Development ===
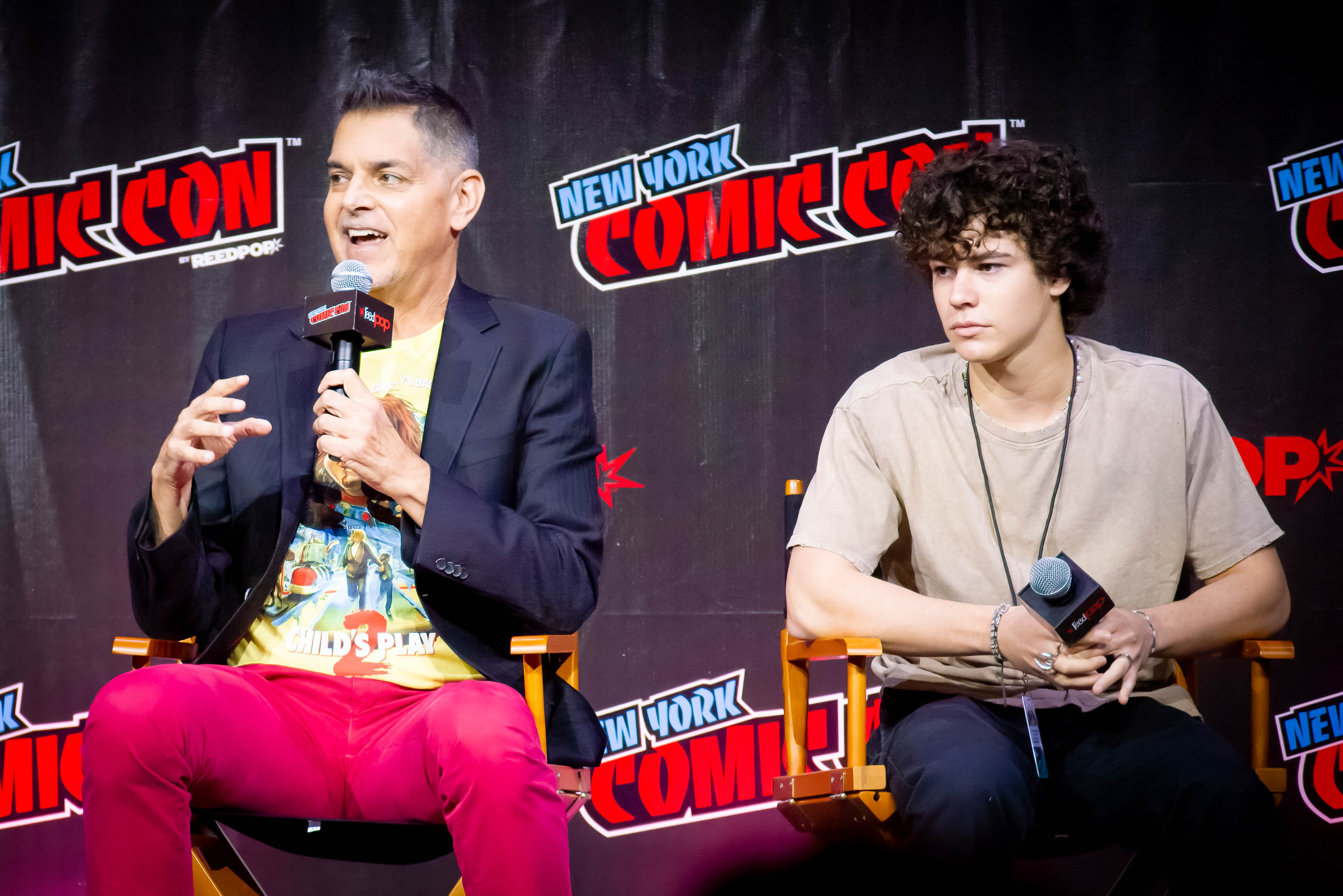
Don Mancini (left) took a somewhat autobiographical approach to Jake's character, played by Zackary Arthur (right).

In February 2018, Don Mancini expressed interest in developing a Chucky television series. On January 29, 2019, it was reported that a television series based on the Child's Play franchise was in development on Syfy, with Don Mancini serving as the creator and showrunner. Mancini was also expected to serve as executive producer alongside David Kirschner, Harley Peyton, and Nick Antosca. On January 11, 2020, during NBCUniversal's presentation at the TCA Winter Press Tour in Pasadena, California, it was announced that Syfy had given the production a straight-to-series order, in a deal with Universal Content Productions. While working on the show, Mancini was concerned about the potential impact the 2019 Child's Play reboot could have had in the franchise, speculating that, had it been a success, Universal Pictures could have decided to abandon the original film's continuity. However, the reboot film (made without Mancini's approval) did not affect the TV show and a sequel has not been produced.

Mancini, who began working for television on the Hannibal series, wanted to "reinvent" the Chucky franchise by bringing it to this format, and subsequently expand its fandom. He took a somewhat autobiographical approach to Jake Wheeler's character, a gay teenager whose father is not accepting of the boy's "burgeoning sexual and romantic identity". The director cites this conflict as referential to his own adolescence. The show is a direct sequel to Cult of Chucky (2017), where the cliffhanger ending puts the titular character "on the road to a sexual exploration" after he transfers his soul to a female body. As an innovation for the character, Chucky is also used as a metaphor of the real life bully, guising himself to be "charming [and] funny" and manipulating people, labelled by Mancini as "the ultimate bully". By making him close to Jake, whose struggles are related to those of the LGBT community, the series also acknowledges that "Chucky himself has a queer kid", that being Glen/Glenda, from Seed of Chucky (2004). According to Decider's Jon O'Brien, "queer characters have been a Child's Play mainstay ever since Bride of Chucky (1998)'s ill-fated David (Gordon Michael Woolvett) back in 1998", but this series marks the first time they have such a prominent presence. However, Mancini stated that Chucky "is just a psychopath" and "will kill anybody", despite posing as Jake's ally.

Mancini wrote all eight episodes of the first season along with a team of writers, and directed the first episode. For Chucky, he was allowed to use the word "fuck" a maximum of ten times per episode, since he considers it an elemental aspect of the character. With eight hours to explore different sides of the story, Mancini saw the opportunity to elucidate the killer's past and answer questions that fans had been asking, like who his first victim was and how he met his bride Tiffany. Regarding the concept of multiple Chuckys, he explained that there are different versions of the character rather than a collective mind, something that also had its origin in Cult of Chucky.

On November 29, 2021, USA Network and Syfy renewed the series for a second season. Mancini began working on the first script in December and told Gizmodo that "a lot of the characters that fans love" might reappear in the second season. This was further commented by Jennifer Tilly, who foresaw the return of Glen/Glenda. Despite being disappointed by the initial reception of Seed of Chucky, Mancini was glad that this character was later embraced by queer fans of the franchise, which motivated him to expand their story in season two. Also inspired by Catholic-based horror films like The Exorcist (1973) and The Omen (1976), he set the second season on a Catholic reform school, thinking that it would be troublesome for Jake and Devon's relationship to keep unfolding in an environment that is not "exactly down with the gays". This also draws from Mancini's youth, since he grew up under the beliefs of the Catholic Church. He also stated that, at this point, making the show had become "cathartic", and that he began to exploit "specific actors' strengths and interests" with his writing (for example, Björgvin Arnarson's comedic side). The season also marks the reintroduction of the "Wedding Belle" doll, an item from Bride of Chucky that Mancini had been planning to reuse "for quite a while".

On January 15, 2023, USA Network and Syfy renewed the series for a third season, which was set for release in the fourth quarter of 2023, and filming began on April 27 of that year. The season explores the idea of ghosts haunting the White House, something that had fascinated Mancini for a long time. He thought having Chucky in the "most secure house in the world" could worsen the protagonists' struggle to kill him. In an interview with Screen Rant, he admitted that the series' lore about voodoo and Damballa (something he did not come up with, but has been an integral part of the franchise since the first film) was taken jokingly when writing previous installments, but this time seemed to expand the supernatural mythology that surrounds Chucky, who Mancini described as "essentially" a ghost or spirit animating an object. He added: "It's interesting to put Chucky into a situation where there are other entities hovering about who might have their own agendas and their own goals".

On September 27, 2024, the series was canceled after three seasons.

=== Casting ===
The first teaser for the show, released on July 15, 2020, revealed that Brad Dourif would again provide the voice of Chucky. He initially recorded his dialogues at home, working remotely with Don Mancini. Between March and April of the following year, many other actors already linked to the franchise were confirmed to have recurring roles, including Jennifer Tilly as Tiffany Valentine, Alex Vincent as Andy Barclay, Christine Elise as Kyle, and Fiona Dourif as Nica Pierce. Fiona also plays an adult version of Charles Lee Ray, but her voice was replaced with Brad's in post-production. A reason for this was that Nica sounded too similar when possessed by Charles, which would have been "confusing" for the audience. All these actors renewed their contract for the second season between April and May 2022.

Devon Sawa was cast to play the roles of twins Lucas and Logan Wheeler, while Barbara Alyn Woods and Lexa Doig took the roles of Michelle Cross and Bree Wheeler, respectively. Four teenage actors star in the series: Zackary Arthur as Jake, Teo Briones as Junior, Alyvia Alyn Lind as Lexy, and Björgvin Arnarson as Devon. Arthur, whose parents did not let him watch R-rated movies as a kid, had his first introduction to the saga in preparation for his role. Arnarson told Screen Rant that, near the end of shooting, Mancini told him that he wished he had written a slightly different version of his character, and maybe make him interested in stand-up comedy. In regards to Lexy, who evolves from the "classic mean girl" to someone who cares about others, Alyn Lind stated: "I just really wanted to make sure that she knew exactly what she wanted at all times [...] I wanted to make that switch very clear." In the second season they are joined by Bella Higginbotham, who described her character Nadine as "a light" in the Chucky franchise.

Woods reprises her role as Michelle in the second season, while Sawa returns as a new character, Father Bryce, the headmaster at the Catholic School of the Incarnate Lord. In June 2022, Lachlan Watson was cast as Glen and Glenda Ray, Chucky's twin children from Seed of Chucky. Mancini cast Watson in the dual role after meeting them during a virtual San Diego Comic-Con 2019 panel about transgender representation, when Watson was speaking about their trans character in Chilling Adventures of Sabrina (2018–2020). Expressing his desire to work with them and following conversations they had about Chucky led Mancini to see "what Glen and Glenda represent for him" in Watson. Gina Gershon, Joe Pantoliano, Sutton Stracke and Meg Tilly make guest appearances; they play themselves as part of Jennifer Tilly's inner circle in the episode "Death on Denial". WWE wrestler Liv Morgan also appears in said episode; she had declared herself a lifelong Child's Play fan and was added to the script by Don Mancini per her request.

In the third season, Sawa returns again as a new character, the fictional President of the United States (his fourth character in the franchise). Brad Dourif, Jennifer Tilly, Zackary Arthur, Björgvin Arnarson, and Alyvia Alyn Lind also return, with Lara Jean Chorostecki playing the President's wife. Comedian Kenan Thompson guest stars in the third episode of this season, playing a taxi driver who soon gets killed by Chucky with an umbrella. Mancini met Thompson through Barbara Alyn Woods, and following the 2022 New York Comic Con, talks about having Thompson play a character began. Amanda Blanchard wrote Thompson's death scene, and Mancini went on to consider it "one of the best kills in the franchise". Sarah Sherman and Nia Vardalos also appear in the season as guest stars. John Waters, who previously played Pete Peters in Seed of Chucky, portrays Good Guys creator, Wendell Wilkins.

=== Filming ===
Filming for the series was scheduled to start in the fourth quarter of 2020, but it was delayed due to the COVID-19 pandemic. Shooting for the first season officially began on March 29, 2021, and concluded on August 11, 2021, in Toronto, Ontario, Canada. The Square One parking lot in Mississauga was used as a "base camp" for the production team. Tony Gardner and Peter Chevako developed Chucky's look with the goal to make him look exactly like in Child's Play 2 (1990). This was because, from Mancini's standpoint, the first sequel seems to be the general fan favorite. It took group of six or seven puppeteers to make Chucky move, which represents 99.5% of the doll's actions, according to Mancini, who has expressed his preference to do things practically over using computer-generated images. Digital effects were used to erase puppeteers from screen or any implements required by the animatronic, such as rods or cables. A child named Jacob sometimes performed as a double.

Mancini explained that there were "several Chuckys" on set to perform different activities, with roughly two props for each action, in order to make him talk, walk or achieve some elaborate shots. Teo Briones, who plays Junior Wheeler in the first season, explained that his death scene was executed with two of those different Chuckys: one to "rough around a little bit", and another that could move its mouth for the close-ups. He also remarked that those scenes showing interaction between the doll and the actors were significantly longer to shoot due to their complexity. On the other hand, the young adult aspect of the show is emphasized by "over-the-top, stylistic, grandiose, visual stuff", because, in Mancini's words, "that's how you experience things when you are a teenager. Everything is incredibly vivid."

Filming for the second season began on April 20, 2022, and concluded on August 29, 2022, in Toronto. This season sees the addition of Lachlan Watson as Glen and Glenda Ray, characters whose scenes had to be carefully planned into schedule, since each of them needed a different characterization that took an hour to complete at the hair and makeup department. Watson, who is a non-binary person and goes by gender-neutral pronouns, explained that the camera would be set and film them as Glenda, then they would change their costume and return to be filmed as Glen, with an ear piece that played the lines they had recorded previously. "When you're in that environment the timing has to be perfect. So that was a big learning curve," Watson said.

Filming for the third season began on April 27, and was expected to last until August 28, 2023, in Toronto. However, it was interrupted due to the 2023 SAG-AFTRA strike. Knowing that the strike was coming, the show's crew focused their resources into finishing the first four episodes of the season before going on hiatus. According to Don Mancini, episodes five and six were almost finished as well, and some pieces of seven and eight. As a consequence of the strike, the season was split in two, with the first half ending on a cliffhanger in the episode "Dressed to Kill". Filming resumed on November 24, 2023, and concluded on December 22 that same year.

=== Music ===
Joseph LoDuca served as the series' composer, as he did in Curse of Chucky (2013) and Cult of Chucky. For the show, he read the scripts beforehand and waited until the scenes were filmed to figure out ways to add a fitting soundtrack. Piano chords are used sometimes throughout the first season as an accompaniment to Jake and Devon's relationship, since the latter is seen playing that same instrument in the first episode. LoDuca also utilized a detuned toy piano to symbolize Chucky's "feigned innocence" in the first season. A similar theme was used to imply "something more sinister" to what was happening in certain scenes. A different version of the Child's Play 2 theme can also be heard in scenes involving Chucky and Caroline. LoDuca described the score for Tiffany as "lush", which helps present her as a "classic Hollywood vamp", while the flashbacks showing how she and Charles Lee Ray became a couple have an "80's synth vibe". Likewise, the show features licensed music by groups and solo artists like Billie Eilish, Kim Petras, Electric Youth, The Go-Go's, Yeah Yeah Yeahs, Shaed, Rob Zombie, and Blue Öyster Cult, amongst many others.

== Promotion and broadcast ==
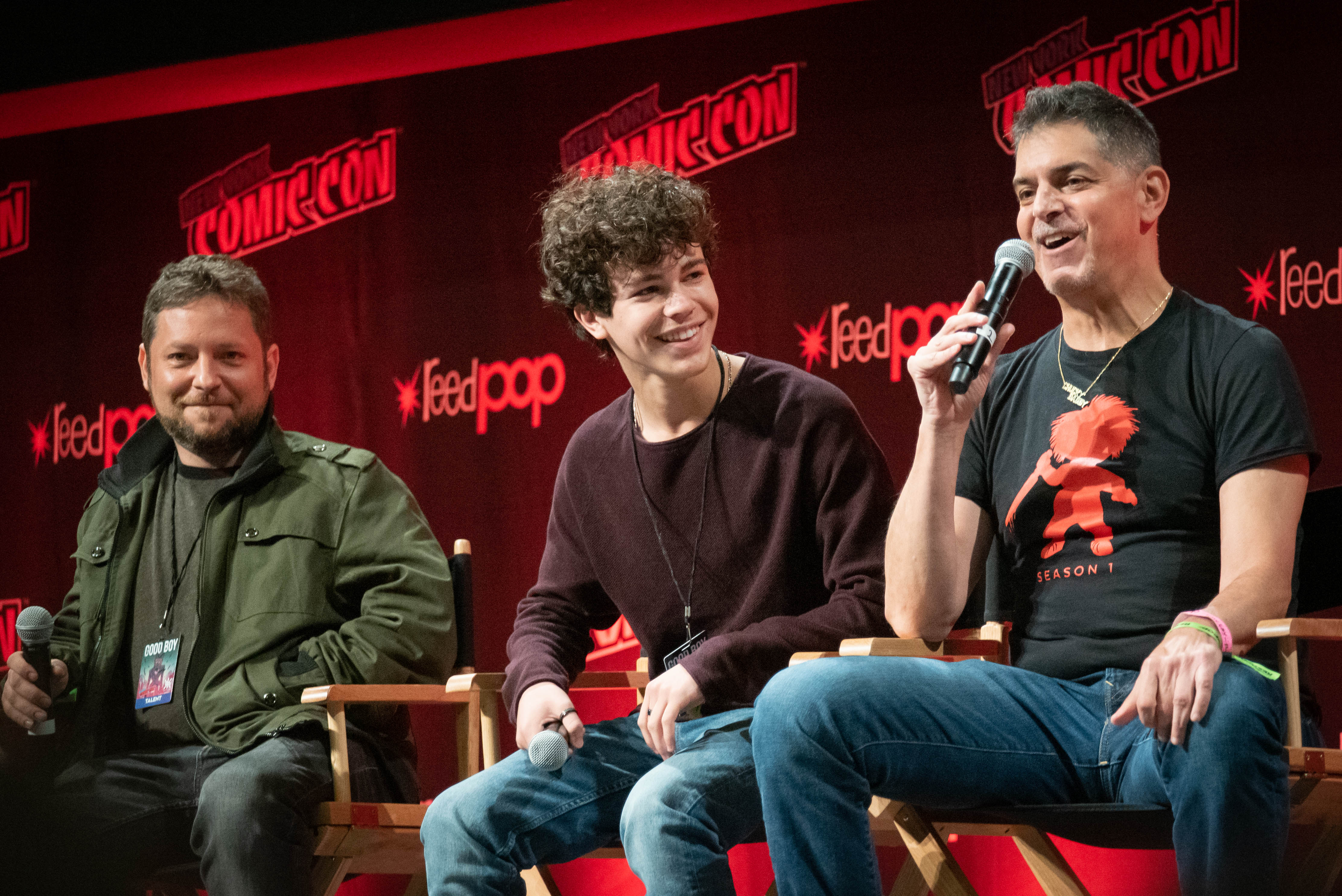
Chucky panel at the 2021 New York Comic Con. From left to right: Alex Vincent, Zackary Arthur, and Don Mancini.

Advertised as a "coming of rage" story, Chucky premiered simultaneously on Syfy and USA Network on October 12, 2021. Prior to the premiere, both channels released several promotional posters and videos, including one where Chucky reenacts the trailer for the 1978 film Magic with his classic voodoo chant to Damballa. In June, Syfy presented the "Pride of Chucky" marathon, consisting of six of the seven films from the Child's Play franchise, in celebration of LGBTQ+ pride month. On October 8, Don Mancini, Zackary Arthur, Jennifer Tilly and Alex Vincent attended the New York Comic Con, where a "Good Guys" branded ice cream truck was displayed. A screening of the first episode was also held at the same event.

The series became available for streaming on Peacock after the season 1 finale on December 1, 2021. A week after the American premiere, Chucky premiered on Showcase in Canada on October 19, 2021. It is also available on Star+ for all of Latin America, 9Now in Australia, Mediaset Infinity in Italy and on Sky Sci-Fi in the United Kingdom and Ireland.

The second season premiered on October 5, 2022. The first trailer, released online on July 23, was going to premiere at the Chucky panel at San Diego Comic-Con that same day, but the show's crew cancelled their attendance just days prior for unclear reasons. A second trailer was released by IGN on September 14, accompanied by a promotional poster that shows Chucky sitting on a golden throne that references past films and the religious themes of the second season. A sneak peek of the second episode was screened during the Chucky panel at New York Comic Con, on October 7.

The third season premiered on October 4, 2023, on Syfy and USA Network, with each episode later appearing on Peacock. The premiere announcement came in the form of a teaser, where Chucky confirms vague details about the season during a "foul-mouthed" press conference. The first teaser trailer later came on August 31, followed by the first official trailer on September 18. The second part of the third season premiered on April 10, 2024.

== Reception ==
=== Critical response ===
On Rotten Tomatoes, the first season holds an approval rating of 94% based on 35 critic reviews, with an average rating of 7/10. The website's critics consensus reads, "A bloody good time that benefits greatly from Brad Dourif's return, Chucky may not play well for non-fans, but franchise devotees will find its absurd humor and creative horror very much intact on the small screen." Metacritic gave the series a weighted average score of 70 out of 100 based on 10 critic reviews, indicating "generally favorable reviews".

Earlier reviews, which focused on the first four episodes that were sent to critics, commented on how the franchise was adapted to the television format. Alex McLevy from The A.V. Club said that the series "retains all of [Chucky's] penchant for grotesque kills and juvenile, acidic humor", and that "when the oddball mix of sensibilities works, [the show] can be daffily entertaining". Television critic Daniel Fienberg finds the franchise "more funny than scary", with this installment still leaning towards the latter; writing for The Hollywood Reporter, he affirmed that "the series delivers solidly" when it comes to displaying Chucky in action, although being "a tiny bit unnerving when it shows how humans interact with the doll". Allison Keene from Paste described it as "surprisingly warm in terms of its atmosphere and direction", whereas Steven Scaife from Slant called it a "funny, absurd series that engenders sympathy as well as shock", also stating: "It creates a world of malleable, alienated kids failed to varying degrees by their parents, and then it expresses the danger of what they find once they're pushed away".

On Rotten Tomatoes, the second season has an approval rating of 93% based on 14 reviews, with an average rating of 8/10. Reviewing the first two episodes that were sent to critics, Collider's Alyse Wax said that the show at first "just seems like standard everyday horrors", although being "fun" and "a delight". Slash Film's Jeff Ewing highlighted the way the three main actors (Arthur, Arnarson and Alyn Lind) play off each other's performances, since they are "more convincing together than apart". The A.V. Club's Tom Philip said the show wouldn't draw in new fans but faithful fans would consider it as "one of the best spooky shows on TV".

On Rotten Tomatoes, the third season holds an approval rating of 100% based on 15 reviews, with an average rating of 8.1/10. The website's critics consensus states, "Chucky takes Washington and ought to earn every horror fan's vote with this raucous third round of mayhem." Reviewing the first four episodes, Slash Film's BJ Colangelo said "Brad Dourif continues to dazzle and destroy as the titular doll, and Chucky is as gruesome, raucous, campy, and decidedly envelope-pushing as ever". Collider's Chase Hutchinson highlighted the performances, as well as the kills for being "wonderfully unhinged" and the humor remaining "as sharp as ever".

=== Ratings ===
Within its first week, the show attracted a total of 4.4 million viewers, half of them being in the 18-49 demographic, according to Nielsen Media Research. It was one of the highest-rated premieres of 2021 in cable television. With the episodes later debuting on both Syfy and USA Network's official YouTube channels for free, Chucky also gathered 2.9 million views combined in the United States by October 25. Although it was the second most in-demand new TV series in mid-November, the sixth episode saw a 10.9% decrease in viewership as the Christmas season approached. The seventh episode, "Twice the Grieving, Double the Loss", was watched by 0.348 million viewers on USA Network and 0.350 million on Syfy, meaning an increase in viewership compared to the previous episode. The first season ended with its eighth episode and a smaller decrease in audience than the sixth, with 0.296 million viewers on Syfy and 0.313 million on USA Network.

The season two premiere was watched by 0.335 million viewers on Syfy and 0.320 million on USA Network. In the following two weeks, the show was watched by 4 million people. According to The Hollywood Reporter, Chucky was among the top 10 dramas in cable television among adults 18–49 in 2022.

=== Accolades ===
Award	Date of ceremony	Category	Nominee(s)	Result	Ref.
Critics' Choice Super Awards	March 17, 2022	Best Horror Series	Chucky	Nominated	
GLAAD Media Awards	April 2, 2022	Outstanding New TV Series	Chucky	Nominated	
Hollywood Critics Association Awards	August 13, 2022	Best Cable Network Series, Drama	Chucky	Nominated	
Saturn Awards	October 25, 2022	Best Horror Television Series: Network/Cable	Chucky	Nominated	
Saturn Awards	October 25, 2022	Best Performance by a Younger Actor in a Network or Cable Television Series	Zackary Arthur	Nominated	
Saturn Awards	October 25, 2022	Best Guest-Starring Performance in a Network or Cable Television Series	Jennifer Tilly	Won	
Saturn Awards	October 25, 2022	Best Television Series Release	Chucky (Season 1)	Won	
Critics' Choice Super Awards	March 16, 2023	Best Horror Series, Limited Series or TV Movie	Chucky	Nominated	
Critics' Choice Super Awards	March 16, 2023	Best Villain in a Series, Limited Series or TV Movie	Brad Dourif	Nominated	
GLAAD Media Awards	March 30, 2023	Outstanding Drama Series	Chucky	Nominated	
Fangoria Chainsaw Awards	May 22, 2023	Best Series	Chucky	Nominated	
Saturn Awards	February 4, 2024	Best Horror Television Series	Chucky	Nominated	
Saturn Awards	February 4, 2024	Best Performance by a Younger Actor in a Television Series	Zackary Arthur	Nominated	
Saturn Awards	March 8, 2026	Best Television Series Release	Chucky (The Complete Series)	Won	

== Future ==
In March 2024, Don Mancini announced he was in the early stages of development on a new Chucky movie that would work in tandem with the series. In September of the same year, he stated that the Chucky franchise would continue following the cancellation of the television series. In February 2026, Jennifer Tilly confirmed she would reprise her role as Tiffany in any future installments. By April, Mancini revealed that the script was currently being written and that he will serve as the director. The film is intended to be released theatrically. In June 2026, Brad Dourif confirmed that he will continue to voice Chucky in any future franchise projects, specifically by telling the crowd, "Nobody's doing Chucky but me."

== See also ==
- List of television series based on films
