= This Is How We Do It (album) =

This is How We Do It

Studio album by Montell Jordan
- Released: April 4, 1995
- Genre: R&B
- Length: 63:23
- Label: Def Jam
- Producers: J.A. Black; Keith Clizark; Shep Crawford; DJ Enuf; Mr. Janky; Montell Jordan; L.C.; Oji Pierce; Doug Rasheed; Rome

Montell Jordan chronology
This is How We Do It (1995)	More... (1996)

Singles from This Is How We Do It
- 1. "This Is How We Do It" Released: February 6, 1995; 2. "Somethin' 4 da Honeyz" Released: August 5, 1995; 3. "Daddy's Home" Released: 1995

This Is How We Do It is the debut studio album by American singer and songwriter Montell Jordan. The album peaked at No. 12 on the Billboard 200 and No. 4 on the Top R&B/Hip-Hop Albums and was certified platinum. The album also featured the single "This Is How We Do It", which made it to No. 1 on the Billboard Hot 100, No. 1 on the Hot R&B/Hip-Hop Singles & Tracks and No. 1 on the Rhythmic Top 40. Another single, "Somethin' 4 da Honeyz", peaked at No. 21 on the Billboard Hot 100 and No. 18 on the Hot R&B/Hip-Hop Singles & Tracks chart.

== Critical reception ==
Professional ratings
Review scores
Source	Rating
AllMusic	4/5 stars
Robert Christgau	(neither)
The Encyclopedia of Popular Music	2/5 stars
Knoxville News Sentinel	2.5/5 stars
Los Angeles Times	3/4 stars
NME	7/10

AllMusic editor Stephen Thomas Erlewine found that "Jordan was blessed with a strong set of producers for his debut album, This Is How We Do It. Working with material that is essentially sub-par, the production team turns in seamless performances, creating hooks and melodies from the deep bass and beats. Jordan's skills as a rapper are fine – he does nothing particularly noteworthy, yet he certainly does not ruin the tracks." J. D. Considine from The Baltimore Sun felt that "Jordan sounds like is an old-school soul man. In fact, after spending some time with his This Is How We Do It, most listeners will find it hard to believe that the album marks his debut." Connie Johnson, writing for The Los Angeles Times, noted that Jordan "has a youthful bravado that permeates every track of his debut release, particularly the hard-slammin’, smash-hit title track. There are some impressive romantic tunes too, but for heart-tugging sincerity, nothing beats his father-to-son love song "Daddy’s Home"."

== Track listing ==
This Is How We Do It track listing
No.	Title	Writer(s)	Producer(s)	Length
1.	"My Mommy Intro"	Ricky Harris	DJ Enuf; Clizark; Mr. Janky; J.A. Black; L.C.	0:40
2.	"Somethin' 4 da Honeyz"	Montell Jordan; Oji Pierce; Doug Rasheed	Pierce; Rasheed; Jordan	4:36
3.	"This Is How We Do It"	Jordan; Pierce	Pierce; Jordan	4:37
4.	"Payback" (featuring Coolio)	Jordan; Rasheed; Artis Ivey	Rasheed	4:57
5.	"I'll Do Anything"	Jordan; Pierce; Jessie Lee Montague	Pierce; Rome; Jordan	6:00
6.	"Don't Keep Me Waiting"	Jordan; Clive Wright	Jordan	4:37
7.	"Comin' Home"	Jordan; Joe Sample; Will Jennings	Jordan	4:14
8.	"Introducing Shaunta" (featuring Shaunta)	Jordan; Shaunta Montgomery	Jordan	3:05
9.	"It's Over"	Jordan; Pierce; Montague	Pierce; Rome; Jordan	3:35
10.	"Midnight Interlude"	Jordan	Jordan	0:43
11.	"I Wanna"	Jordan	Jordan	5:26
12.	"Down on My Knees"	Jordan; Pierce	Pierce; Jordan	6:06
13.	"Gotta Get My Roll On"	Jordan; Gregory Webster; Andrew Noland; Marvin Pierce; Leroy Bonner; Norman Napier; Marshall Jones; Ralph Middlebrooks; Walter Morrison; Arthur Adams	Jordan	5:13
14.	"Close the Door"	Kenneth Gamble; Leon Huff	Pierce; Jordan	4:52
15.	"Daddy's Home"	Jordan; Shappell Crawford	Jordan; Shappell Crawford	4:28
Total length:				63:23

Sample credits

- "Somethin' 4 da Honeyz" contains a replayed sample from "Summer Madness", written by Alton Taylor, Robert Mickens, Robert Bell, Ronald Bell, George Brown, Ricky Westfield, Dennis Thomas, and Claydes Smith.
- "This Is How We Do It" contains elements from "Children's Story", written by Ricky Walters and performed by Slick Rick.
- "Payback" contains replayed elements from:
  - "Unfaithful", written by Paul Anthony George, Brian George, Lucien George, Curt Bedeau, Gerry Charles, Hugh Junior Clark, and Alexander Mosley.
  - "You'll Never Find Another Love Like Mine", written by Kenneth Gamble and Leon Huff.
- "Comin' Home" contains elements from "Back in LA", written by Joe Sample and Will Jennings, and performed by B.B. King.
- "It's Over" contains elements from:
  - "La Di Da Di", written and performed by Slick Rick and Doug E. Fresh.
  - "Sukiyaki", written by Rokusuke Ei and Hachidai Nakamura.
- "Gotta Get My Roll On" contains elements from:
  - "Funky Worm"; written by Gregory Webster, Andrew Noland, Marvin Pierce, Leroy Bonner, Norman Napier, Marshall Jones, Ralph Middlebrooks, and Walter Morrison; and performed by the Ohio Players.
  - "I've Got Something Up My Sleeve", written by Arthur Adams, and performed by B.B. King.

== Charts ==
=== Weekly charts ===
Weekly chart performance for This Is How We Do It
Chart (1995)	Peak position
Australian Albums (ARIA)	69
Canada Top Albums/CDs (RPM)	4
Dutch Albums (Album Top 100)	35
German Albums (Offizielle Top 100)	58
New Zealand Albums (RMNZ)	33
UK Albums (Official Charts)	53
UK R&B Albums (Official Charts)	7
US Billboard 200	12
US Top R&B/Hip-Hop Albums (Billboard)	4

=== Year-end charts ===
Year-end chart performance for This Is How We Do It
Chart (1995)	Position
US Billboard 200	67
US Top R&B/Hip-Hop Albums (Billboard)	39

== Certifications ==
Certifications for This Is How We Do It
Region	Certification	Certified units/sales
Canada (Music Canada)	Platinum	100,000^{^}
United States (RIAA)	Platinum	1,000,000^{^}
^{^} Shipments figures based on certification alone.
