= Montell Jordan =

American singer (born 1968)

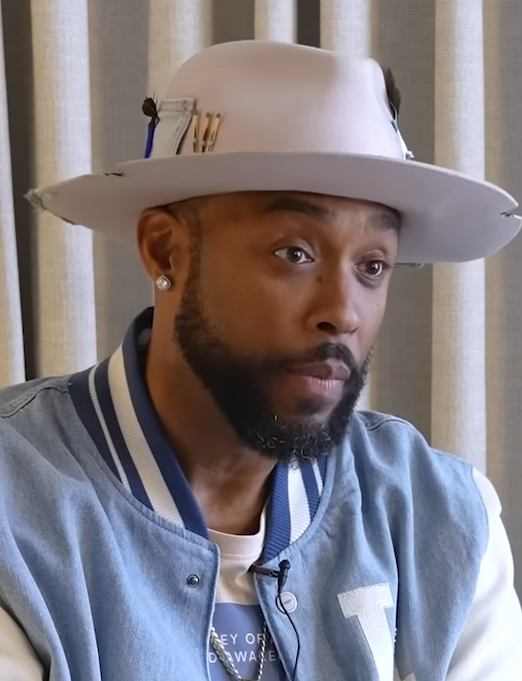
- Jordan in 2025

Background information
- Born: Montell Du'Sean Jordan; December 3, 1968 (age 57); Los Angeles, California, U.S.
- Education: Pepperdine University (BS)
- Genres: R&B; hip hop soul; hip hop; new jack swing
- Occupations: Singer; songwriter; record producer; pastor
- Years active: 1991–present
- Labels: Fontana; Koch; PMP; RAL; Def Jam; Def Soul
- Spouse: Kristin Jordan (m. 1994)
- Website: montellandkristin.com

Montell Du'Sean Jordan (born December 3, 1968) is an American R&B singer, songwriter, and producer. Best known for his 1995 single "This Is How We Do It", and "Get It On Tonite", Jordan was the primary male solo artist on Def Jam's Def Soul imprint until leaving the label in 2003. He is also known for his 1998 hit single "Let's Ride" featuring Master P and Silkk the Shocker.

In 2010, Jordan became the worship leader at Victory World Church in Norcross, Georgia.

== Early life and education ==
Montell Jordan was born in South Central Los Angeles to Elijah and Delois Jordan. Born into a Baptist family, Jordan attended his local church frequently as a child, where his mother and father worked as deacons. Growing up, Jordan played piano for his church as a musician. In the mid-1980s, he attended Junipero Serra High School in Gardena, California, as well as Pepperdine University in Malibu, California, where he earned a bachelor's degree in communications. He became a member of the Kappa Alpha Psi fraternity in the spring of 1989. Jordan graduated in 1991.

After graduating, Jordan started working for Williams Television Time, where he helped make TV infomercials. In an attempt to jump-start his career as a musician, Jordan invited his coworkers to see him perform at a showcase. According to interviews with Jordan, musicians Janet Jackson and Shanice Wilson attended the show. From there he made his first mix-tape and flew out to New York with producer Russell Simmons of Def Jam Records. He signed to Def Jam in 1995, becoming the second R&B artist to sign with the label.

== Musical career ==
Jordan's first single was the 1995 No. 1 hit "This Is How We Do It", which sampled Slick Rick's earlier Def Jam hit "Children's Story". According to interviews with Jordan, the song is a "reflection of what street life was for a kid who grew up in the neighborhood." The single reached No. 1 on the Billboard Hot 100 and remained there for seven consecutive weeks. Thanks to the enormous success of the single, Jordan's first album went platinum, selling over a million copies.

In 1996, Jordan opened for Boyz II Men in Vancouver. During the performance, a stage flare disoriented him, causing him to fall off the seven-foot stage and hit his head. Despite being taken to the hospital, Jordan sustained no injuries. Jordan would later describe the event as a "modern-day miracle" and that he owed his life to Boyz II Men.

Jordan followed up his success with "Somethin' 4 da Honeyz", which peaked at No. 21. Later hits included "Let's Ride" with Master P and Silkk the Shocker and "I Like". He co-wrote, produced and sang back-up on Shae Jones's 1999 album Talk Show. The Jordan single "Get It On Tonite" peaked at No. 4 in the same year.

In addition to crafting his own material, Jordan has written and produced for other artists, including Christina Milian, 98 Degrees, Shae Jones, Deborah Cox ("Nobody's Supposed to Be Here", 1998), Lil' Mo ("Ta Da", 2000), and Sisqó (the number-one hit "Incomplete", 2000). The singer had a comedic supporting role in the film The Fighting Temptations as Mr. Johnson, an aggressive convict who is self-conscious about his high-pitched voice. He made a cameo appearance in The Nutty Professor, and he performed in the documentary Standing in the Shadows of Motown. In 2000, his song "Unstoppable" was featured exclusively in the video game NBA Live 2001. He performed the song "Careless Whisper" together with musician Dave Koz during the evening gown competition in Miss Universe 2000, in Nicosia, Cyprus.

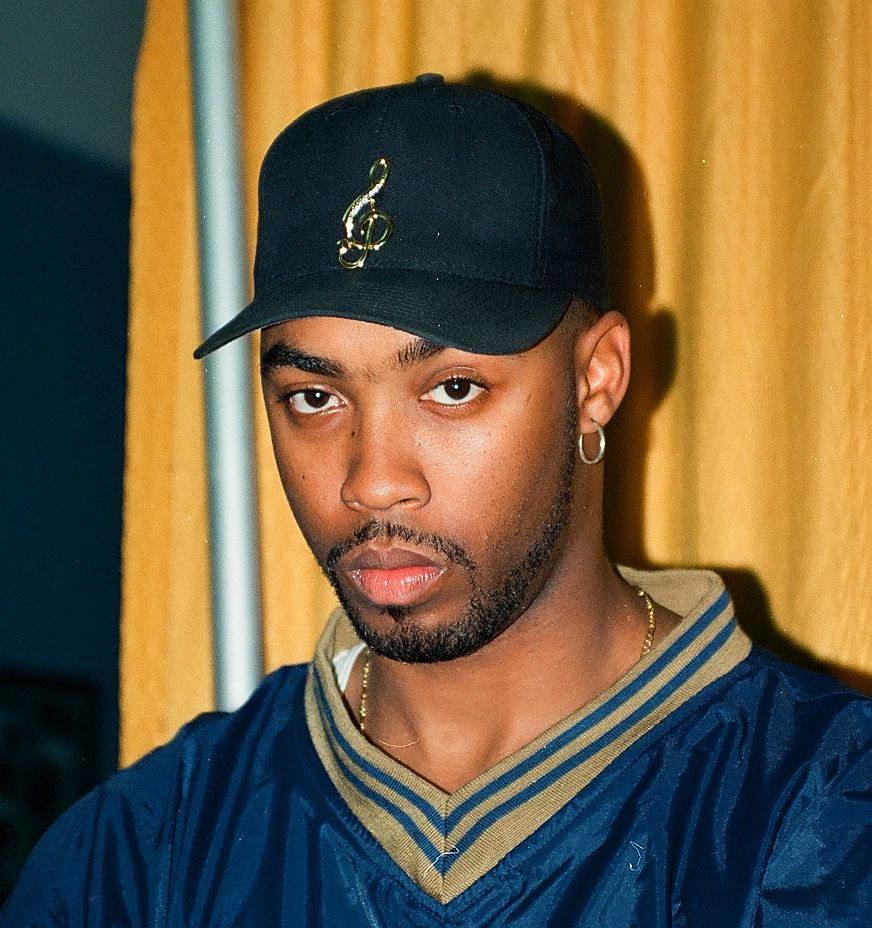
Jordan in 1995

In 2003, Jordan left Def Soul, citing artistic differences as the reason for the departure. In recent interviews, Jordan recalls issues he had with his image under Def Soul. In particular, Jordan wished to leave his image as a sex symbol behind and mature artistically. Jordan was marketed as a sex icon since his start at Def Soul, despite having been married to Kristin Hudson before even signing. Whenever he was asked about his relationship status, Jordan would simply respond that he was "married to [his] music." Realizing Def Soul was committed to maintaining Jordan's current image as their prominent R&B artist, Jordan left the label to sign with Koch Records. That same year, Jordan released the album Life After Def under Koch. He contributed to the album of Croatian singer Nina Badrić in the duet "Ne dam te nikom" ("I'm Not Giving You to Anyone"). Jordan's last release was 2008's Let It Rain on the Fontana Records label.

Through 2015 and 2016, Jordan appeared at the halftime shows of various sporting games, as well as on The Late Late Show with James Corden, performing "This Is How We Do It".

In 2019, during an appearance on the SoulBack R&B Podcast, Jordan confirmed that he has recorded his first R&B album in over a decade and plans to release it this year.

On May 19, 2019, Jordan sang "This Is How We Do It" on the finale of American Idol, with a minor portion rapped by eliminated contestant Margie Mays, due to a performance of the song by Jake Puliti from earlier in the season in the audition round, which led to one of the memorable moments of the season with Katy Perry doing the worm.

On November 19, 2019, Jordan was a guest on Tamron Hall's talk show for her Throwback week series in which he performed "This Is How We Do It". During the show, he talked about his upcoming album, The Masterpiece, which would be released on November 29.

In 2022, Jordan competed in season eight of The Masked Singer as "Panther". When Jordan was eliminated on "Vegas Night" alongside Jeff Dunham as "Pi-Rat", Nick Cannon stated to the panel that this is the one time that they didn't guess Montell Jordan like they did for the other contestants. In addition, Jordan also sang this show's rendition of "This Is How We Do It".

== Ministry career ==
Jordan is now a born-again Christian and used to work at Victory Church (formerly Victory World Church) in Norcross, Georgia as the executive worship pastor. He lived and worshiped with the church team called Victory World Music (now called Victory House Worship). In 2010, Jordan planned to make a comeback album as his foray back into the music industry. However, during a fast at Victory Church, Jordan said he was told by God to quit the music industry. He decided to cancel his plans and dedicate his life to his faith.

Jordan created a music collective at Victory Church called "Victory World Music". In early 2011, they released a Christian album featuring the song "Shake Heaven", with Beckah Shae.

After leaving Victory Church, Montell Jordan, alongside his wife Kristin Jordan, co-founded Master Peace Church, a fully virtual ministry dedicated to nurturing spiritual growth and community engagement through online services and resources. The church's commitment extends to preserving marriages and providing worldwide access to its teachings through digital platforms. Their virtual services were held every Sunday from 2022 to 2024 and offered a range of programs to address spiritual needs and foster deep, meaningful relationships among its congregation. The Jordans are now focusing on their other ministry with Marriage Masterpeace and the Retreat Center, further emphasizing their dedication to strengthening family bonds and supporting marriages through spiritual guidance.

== Personal life ==
Jordan married his wife, Kristin, in 1994. They have five children and 4 grandchildren. Montell and Kristin co-authored their first book in 2017: This Is How We Do It! Making Your Marriage a Masterpeace.

In 2023, Jordan appeared on the reality TV series Special Forces: World's Toughest Test. He was eliminated in the second episode due to a medical issue. Jordan is six feet, eight inches tall.

== Awards and nominations ==
| Award | Year | Nominee(s) | Category | Result | Ref. |
|---|---|---|---|---|---|
| MTV Video Music Awards | 1995 | "This Is How We Do It" | Best R&B Video | Nominated | |
| MTV Video Music Awards | 1995 | "This Is How We Do It" | Best Dance Video | Nominated | |
| Pollstar Concert Industry Awards | 1996 | Somethin' 4 Da Honeyz Tour | Best New Rap/Dance Artist Tour | Nominated | |

== Discography ==
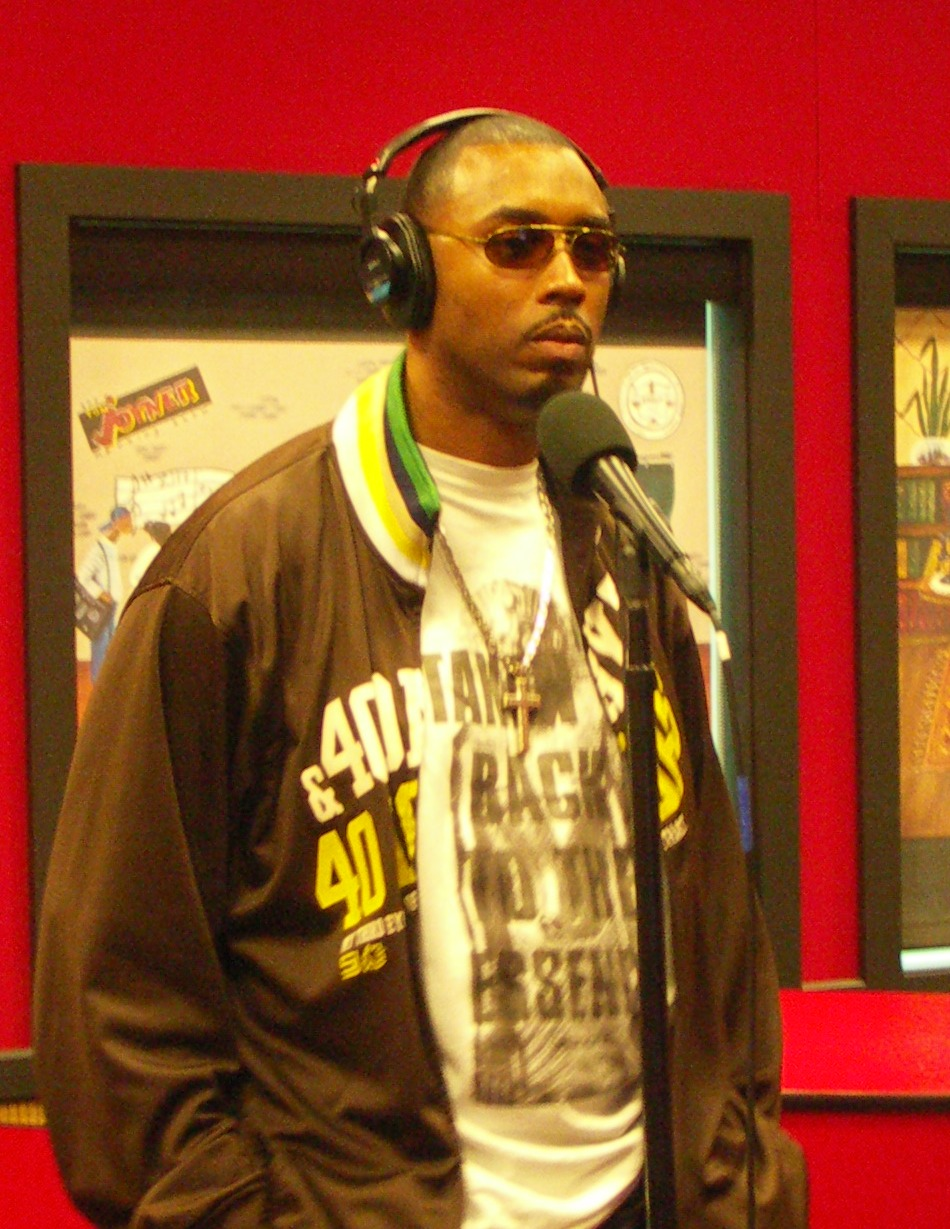
Jordan at the Tom Joyner studios in 2008

Studio albums

- This Is How We Do It (1995)
- More… (1996)
- Let's Ride (1998)
- Get It On…Tonite (1999)
- Montell Jordan (2002)
- Life After Def (2003)
- Let It Rain (2008)
- Masterpeace (2019)

== Filmography ==
- The Nutty Professor (1996) as Himself
- The Fighting Temptations (2003) as Mr. Johnson
- The List (2015)
- The Masked Singer (2022) as Himself / Panther (season 8 contestant)
- Special Forces: World's Toughest Test (2023) as Himself
- The Real Housewives of Atlanta (2026) as Himself; Season 17, episode 11: "Shady Text and Bigger Regrets"
