= Chuckey Charles =

American songwriter

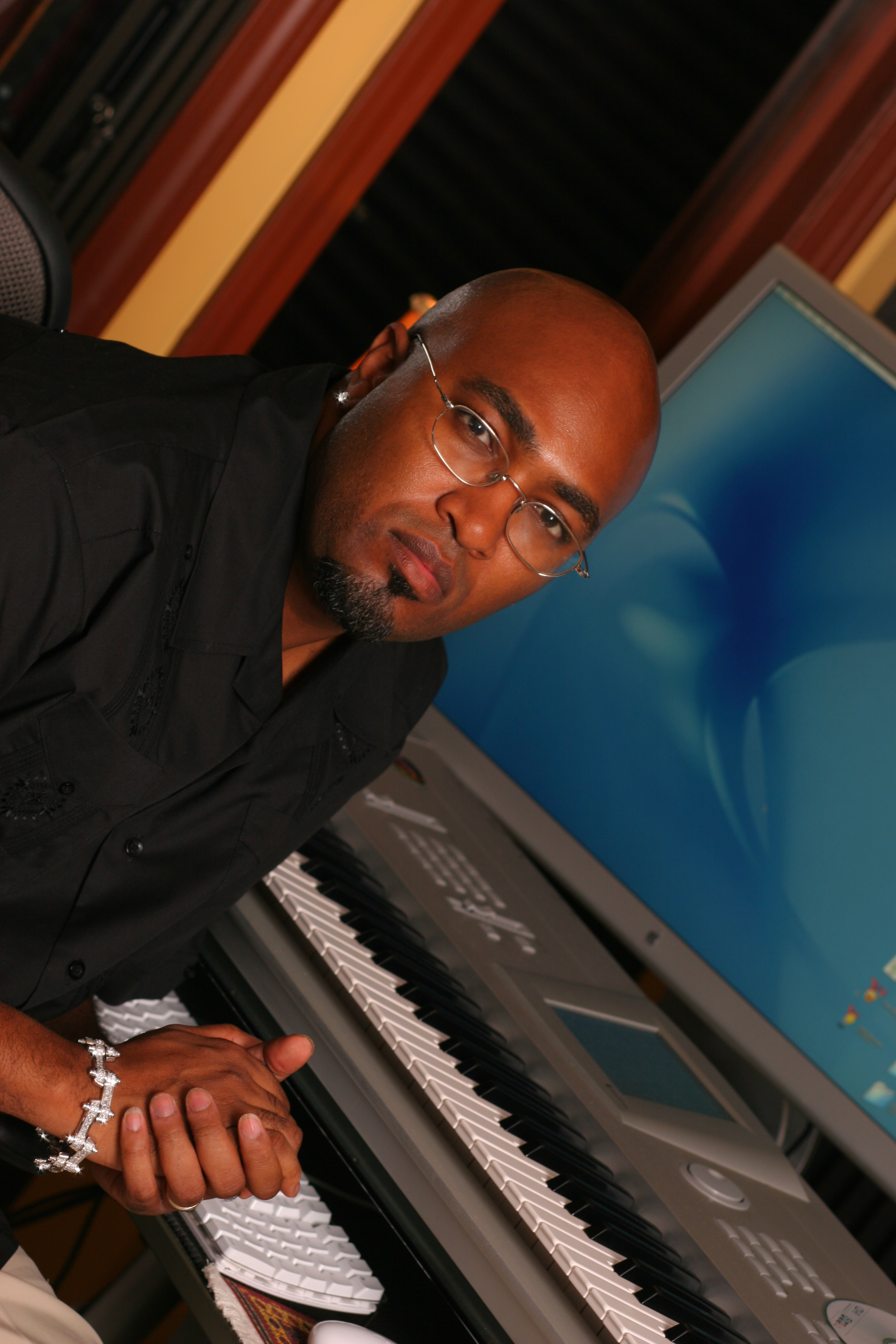

Background information
- Also known as: Chuckey "C2" Charles
- Born: December 18, 1970 (age 55); Chicago, Illinois, United States
- Genres: R&B; Hip hop Alternative; Pop; Gospel
- Occupations: film composer, record producer, songwriter, musical arranger, musician, tour manager, Artist Booking Agent
- Years active: 1994–present
- Labels: Hit'em Twice Productions, Bevlynnesa Music Publishing/BMI

Chuckey Charles (born December 18, 1970) is an American award nominated film composer, songwriter and record producer. He moves from pop to rap to R&B, and has produced, written and worked with Grammy Award winning songwriters, artist, and producers from Sean Garrett, Usher Raymond and Dallas Austin to writer/producer Jerry Ragavoy. He has also produced Kindred the Family Soul, Vega, Loon and Montell Jordan among others. He first became interested in music at a young age, where he started playing the guitar at the age of six and gradually moving on to the piano at the age of nine. Throughout his elementary and high school years he attended Rockford, Illinois, C.A.P.A. school for the creative and performing arts. He continued his musical interest where he became the composer of many musical compositions scored along with his orchestra instructor. After graduating from high school and attending a brief stint in college majoring in music theory, Chuckey Charles started to focus on larger aspirations of the music business and industry.

== Beginning ==
Chuckey Charles was born in Chicago, Illinois. In the mid 1990s, Charles emerged on the Atlanta music scene after the persuasion of a childhood friend who had become acquainted with notable key players in the growing Atlanta music circuit. After visiting and shortly thereafter relocating to Atlanta, Charles began working on various studio projects and networking on his own which resulted in song placements on the then popular "Jack The Rapper's" Convention CD compilation and, the Trey Lorenz project of that same year.

Charles began to get the attention of the key players in the "Atlanta Music Circle", in addition to the New York and Los Angeles area where he was also involved with production work. After freelancing as an independent producer, Charles caught the attention of Christopher "Tricky" Stewart and the RedZone Entertainment organization, which Stewart had just recently formed, signing Charles on as the first producer to the RedZone Entertainment team. While at RedZone, Charles worked alongside the Grammy Award winning producer Kevin "She'kspere" Briggs, an affiliate of RedZone and Christopher "Tricky" Stewart himself on various projects.

While producing at RedZone, Charles had the opportunity to broaden his working relationships with other artists within the music industry such as Sam Salter, Tamar Braxton, Blaque, Blu Cantrell, The-Dream, Kandi Burruss and Solé. He continued to catch the attention of other production organizations in the Atlanta area, one being that of D.A.R.P Recordings, run by Dallas Austin. Austin contracted Charles out to do work for many of his artist son the Freeworld recording label including Dymond, Vega, Richard Lugo, Debra Killings, and JT Money.

== Transition ==
In 2008, Charles appeared as the cover model for best selling author Crystal Perkins-Stell book Lyfe Afta Cash Money, a trilogy in a series of novels written by the author. Charles has also worked as an A&R director for a recording label distributed through WEA, and has also established his own production and publishing company Hit'em Twice Productions and Bevlynnesa Music Publishing through BMI. After becoming more involved on the business side of the music industry, Charles was approached by Montell Jordan to become his tour manager and musical director for scheduled world tours. While in Germany and working on Jordan's seventh 2008 album release, Let It Rain, Charles produced and co-wrote the single "Me and U", which put Jordan back on the Billboard charts after a six-year absence, entering on the Hot R&B/Hip-Hop Singles & Tracks. in the Hot Shot Debut position and peaking at number 37 on the Billboard Hot Adult R&B Airplay chart.
