= Patrick Thomas O'Brien =

American actor

- Born: 1951 (age 74–75); Wisconsin U.S.
- Occupation: Actor
- Years active: 1976–present

Patrick Thomas O'Brien (born 1951) is an American actor. He is perhaps best known for playing the role of Mr. Dewey, the math teacher from Saved by the Bell.

== Life and career ==
O'Brien was born in Wisconsin and graduated from Regis High School in Eau Claire. He then attended the University of Wisconsin-Eau Claire receiving his B.A. in 1975. O'Brien has appeared in several films including The Personals, Airborne, Stuart Little, The Curious Case of Benjamin Button, Catch Me If You Can and Kiss the Girls. Despite several movie appearances, the majority of O'Brien's career has centered on television, which has included appearances on Monk, It's Always Sunny in Philadelphia, Sabrina the Teenage Witch, Gilmore Girls, The West Wing, Married... with Children, Baywatch, Boston Common, Parker Lewis Can't Lose, Saved by the Bell, and Home Improvement. He moved to Minneapolis in 2004 and has been performing, directing, and producing for various theaters in the Twin Cities.

== Filmography ==
=== Films ===
Year	Film	Role	Director	Credited as	Notes
1982	The Personals	Joyce Gibson	Peter Markle	Patrick O'Brien	
1989	UHF	Satan	Jay Levey	Patrick O'Brien	
1991	Driven to Kill	Mobster	Josh Gazarian	Patrick O'Brien	
1993	Airborne	Uncle Louis	Rob Bowman	Patrick O'Brien	
1994	Wagons East	Stranger	Peter Markle	Patrick Thomas O'Brien	
1995	The Brady Bunch Movie	Auctioneer	Betty Thomas	Patrick Thomas O'Brien	
1995	Forget Paris	Angry Fan	Billy Crystal	Patrick Thomas O'Brien	
1995	Girl in the Cadillac	Ticket Man	Lucas Platt	Patrick Thomas O'Brien	
1997	Eight Days a Week	Erica's Father	Michael Davis	Patrick O'Brien	
1997	976-WISH	Spade	David L. Bertman	Patrick Thomas O'Brien	Short film
1997	Kiss the Girls	Reporter	Gary Fleder	Patrick T. O'Brien	
1998	Dead Man on Campus	Priest	Alan Cohn	Patrick T. O'Brien	
1998	Pleasantville	Roy	Gary Ross	Patrick T. O'Brien	
1998	A Perfect Pitch	James	Bruce Worrilow	Patrick O'Brien	Short film
1999	Me and Will	Hick #2	Melissa Behr and Sherrie Rose	Patrick Thomas O'Brien	
1999	Stuart Little	Uncle Stretch	Rob Minkoff	Patrick O'Brien	
2000	The Brainiacs.com	Mr. Greenmail	Blair Treu	Patrick T. O'Brien	Direct-to-video release
2002	Catch Me If You Can	Mr. Hendricks	Steven Spielberg	Patrick T. O'Brien	
2002	Co-incidence	Towny	Cristian YoungMiller	Patrick Thomas O'Brien	
2003	Inhabited	Mr. Kelly	Kelly Sandefur	Patrick O'Brien	Direct-to-video release
2003	Intolerable Cruelty	Bailiff	Joel and Ethan Coen	Patrick Thomas O'Brien	
2003	Dickie Roberts: Former Child Star	Mr. Gertrude	Sam Weisman	Patrick Thomas O'Brien	
2004	Win a Date with Tad Hamilton!	Father Newell	Robert Luketic	Patrick O'Brien	
2008	The Last Days of Limbo	Father Bruce	Jason Ward	Patrick Thomas O'Brien	Short film
2008	Uncross the Stars	Priest	Kenny Golde	Patrick O'Brien	
2008	The Curious Case of Benjamin Button	Dr. Rose	David Fincher	Patrick Thomas O'Brien	
2009	Nobody	Dr. Weinstein	Rob Perez	Patrick Thomas O'Brien	
2014	Huske	Lars	Joshua Robertson	Patrick Thomas O'Brien	Short film
2015	The Public Domain	Bert Pohle	Patrick Coyle	Patrick Thomas O'Brien	
2017	Project Eden	Stephen Erickson	Ashlee Jensen and Terrance M. Young	Patrick Thomas O'Brien	
2018	Adulthood	Jimmy Slater (future)	Justin and Kristin Schaack	Patrick Thomas O'Brien	Short film
2018	Fairy Tail	Priest	Justin and Kristin Schaack	Patrick Thomas O'Brien	Short film
2021	The Last Son	Bartender	Tim Sutton	Patrick Thomas O'Brien	
2021	Sold Out	Wayne	Tim Dahlseld	Patrick Thomas O'Brien	
2022	Angry Neighbors	Jeff Jefferson	Warren Brock	Patrick Thomas O'Brien	

=== Television ===
Year(s)	Title	Role(s)	Credited as	Notes
1983	Kenny Rogers as The Gambler: The Adventure Continues	Jenkins	Patrick O'Brien	TV movie
1983	Jennifer Slept Here	Minister	Patrick T. O'Brien	S1E7 "Trading Faces"
1986	Easy Street	Don Martin	Patrick Thomas O'Brien	S1E12 "Demon Child '86"
1987	Jake and the Fatman	Ritchie	Patrick T. O'Brien	S1E7 "Body and Soul"
1987	Hooperman	Man in Tie	Patrick T. O'Brien	S1E11 "Deck the Cell with Bars of Folly"
1987–1988	Night Court	Man No. 2; Ernie Carter	Patrick O'Brien; Patrick T. O'Brien	S4E17 "Christine's Friend"; S5E12 "Dan, the Walking Time Bomb"
1988	The Facts of Life	Mr. Copeland	Patrick T. O'Brien	S9E23 "The Beginning of the End"
1988–1996	Married... with Children	Wally; Bob Thompson	Patrick T. O'Brien	S2E15 "Build a Better Mousetrap"; S11E2 "Children of the Corns"
1989	Have Faith	Mr. Mahaffey	Patrick Thomas O'Brien	S1E4 "Bingo"
1989–1992	Saved by the Bell (original series)	Mr. Dewey	Patrick Thomas O'Brien	4 episodes
1990	1st & Ten	Anthony Smalss	Patrick Thomas O'Brien	S5E13 "Earn This One for Ernie"
1990	Parker Lewis Can't Lose	Mr. Kubiac	Patrick T. O'Brien	S1E2 "Operation Kubiac"
1990	Life Goes On	Father McMichaels	Patrick Thomas O'Brien	S2E1 "Honeymoon from Hell"
1990	Camp Cucamonga	Virgil	Patrick Thomas O'Brien	TV movie
1990	The New Dragnet	Wally Tilson	Patrick T. O'Brien	S1E2 "The Living Victim"
1990	The Great Los Angeles Earthquake	Jim Allen	Patrick Thomas O'Brien	TV movie
1991	Babes	Rusty	Patrick T. O'Brien	S1E16 "Babes in Boyland"
1991	Equal Justice	Thornell Katz	Patrick Thomas O'Brien	S1E2 "Without Prejudice"
1991	Switched at Birth	Dr. Purchio	Patrick T. O'Brien	S1E1
1991	Marilyn and Me	Casting Director	Patrick O'Brien	TV movie
1991	The Wonder Years	Mr. Santa	Patrick O'Brien	S5E9 "Christmas Party"
1992	Home Improvement	Eugene "Ink" Ingram	Patrick T. O'Brien	S1E16 "Jill's Birthday"
1992	The Larry Sanders Show	Carl Henckel	Patrick T. O'Brien	S1E13 "Hey Now"
1992–1996	Picket Fences	John Vermette; Kurt	Patrick Thomas O'Brien	S1E8 "Sacred Hearts"; S4E13 "My Romance"
1993	Lois & Clark: The New Adventures of Superman	Barker	Patrick Thomas O'Brien	S1E8 "The Green, Green Glow of Home"
1994	Getting By	Butler	Patrick Thomas O'Brien	S2E15 "The Rich Guy"
1994	Hart to Hart: Home Is Where the Hart Is	Desk Clerk	Patrick Thomas O'Brien	TV movie
1994	Babylon 5	Cart Owner	Patrick O'Brien	S1E17 "Legacies"
1994	Baywatch	Tom	Patrick O'Brien	S5E1 "Livin' on the Fault Line: Part 1"; S5E2 "Livin' on the Fault Line: Part 2"
1994	The Boys Are Back	Teacher	Patrick Thomas O'Brien	S1E6 "The Good, the Bad and the Hansens"
1995	Maybe This Time	James Howell	Patrick T. O'Brien	S1E11 "Judgment Day"
1995–1996	Night Stand with Dick Dietrick	Neil	Patrick T. O'Brien	S1E3 "Crime Show"; S1E52 "Clip Show"
1996	Caroline in the City	Councilman Hardy	Patrick T. O'Brien	S1E13 "Caroline and the Twenty-Eight-Pound Walleye"
1996	Cybill	Tweedy Man	Patrick T. O'Brien	S2E15 "Lowenstein's Lament"
1996	Saved by the Bell: The New Class	Mr. Dewey	Patrick T. O'Brien	S4E6 "Little Hero"
1996	The John Larroquette Show	Mr. Hunter	Patrick O'Brien	S4E3 "Bathing with Ernest Hemingway"
1997	Boston Common	Ron	Patrick T. O'Brien	S2E14 "A Night in Camelot"
1997	The Naked Truth	Lab Man	Patrick Thomas O'Brien	S2E9 "The Birds"
1997	Step by Step	Reverend	Patrick T. O'Brien	S6E14 "Future Shock"
1997	Family Matters	Mr. Denton	Patrick Thomas O'Brien	S9E9 "A Pain in Harassment"
1997	Union Square	Kenny	Patrick T. O'Brien	S1E8 "Jack Gets a Hot Tip"
1997	Working	Carl	Patrick Thomas O'Brien	S1E8 "Top O' the World Ma"
1997–1998	Sabrina the Teenage Witch	Index Man; Cupid	Patrick T. O'Brien	S1E20 "Meeting Dad's Girlfriend"; S2E3 "Dummy for Love"; S2E17 "The Equalizer"
1998	The Wayans Bros.	Mr. Webster	Patrick O'Brien	S4E11 "All in the Family Feud"
1998	Silk Stalkings	Mr. Petrie	Patrick T. O'Brien	S8E6 "Hidden Agenda"
1998	Pensacola: Wings of Gold		Patrick O'Brien	S2E7 "Boom"
1999	Sliders	Jake	Patrick T. O'Brien	S4E17 "Data World"
1999	7th Heaven	Professor Valentine	Patrick T. O'Brien	S4E5 "With Honors"
1999	Dharma & Greg	Roger	Patrick T. O'Brien	S3E9 "Law & Disorder"
2001	For Your Love	Mr. Spencer	Patrick T. O'Brien	S4E9 "The Model Client"
2001	The West Wing	Hanson	Patrick Thomas O'Brien	S2E22 "Two Cathedrals"
2001	State of Grace	Bill	Patrick T. O'Brien	S1E6 "Crime and Self-Punishment"
2001	Dead Last	Jack	Patrick Thomas O'Brien	S1E7 "Gastric Distress"
2001	Providence	Dr. Smithers	Patrick O'Brien	S4E3 "Impulse Control"
2001	Roswell	Minister	Patrick T. O'Brien	S3E6 "To Have and to Hold"
2001	Reba	Mr. Devaney	Patrick T. O'Brien	S1E8 "Don't Know Much About History"
2002	CSI: Crime Scene Investigation	Edward Cormier	Patrick Thomas O'Brien	S2E15 "Burden of Proof"
2002	Felicity	Dan Waldron	Patrick O'Brien	S4E15 "The Paper Chase"
2002	Son of the Beach	Chip's Poopie	Patrick Thomas O'Brien	S3E14 "Bad News, Mr. Johnson"
2002	MDs	Mr. Lumly	Patrick Thomas O'Brien	S1E5 "Cruel and Unusual"
2002	Push, Nevada		Patrick Thomas O'Brein (sic)	S1E6 "S.O.S."
2003	ER	Carmichael	Patrick Thomas O'Brien	S9E13 "No Good Deed Goes Unpunished"
2003	L.A. Dragnet	Janitor	Patrick Thomas O'Brien	S1E2 "The Big Ruckus"
2003	Carnivàle	Clark	Patrick T. O'Brien	S1E2 "After the Ball Is Over"
2003	Malcolm in the Middle	Dad Driver	Patrick Thomas O'Brien	S5E7 "Christmas Trees"
2004	JAG	Alfred	Patrick Thomas O'Brien	S9E14 "People vs. SecNav"
2004	Gilmore Girls	Brian's Dad	Patrick Thomas O'Brien	S4E19 "Afterboom"
2004	Monk	Brent Donovan	Patrick Thomas O'Brien	S3E7 "Mr. Monk and the Employee of the Month"
2004	Phil of the Future	Mr. Fleet	Patrick O'Brien	S1E12 "You Say Toe-Mato"
2004	Dr. Vegas	Burns	Patrick Thomas O'Brien	S1E3 "Dead Man, Live Bet"
2006	It's Always Sunny in Philadelphia	Associate	Patrick Thomas O'Brien	S2E8 "The Gang Runs for Office"
2006	Drake & Josh	Minister	Patrick Thomas O'Brien	S4E6 "The Great Doheny"
2015	Theater People	Peter	Patrick Thomas O'Brien	9 episodes
2016	Love Always, Santa	Ferris Wheel Operator	Patrick Thomas O'Brien	TV movie
2020–2021	Saved by the Bell (2020 reboot)	Mr. Dewey	Patrick Thomas O'Brien	4 episodes
2021	Breakdowns	Patrick	Patrick Thomas O'Brien	TV movie
2023	Rescuing Christmas	Chuck	Patrick O'Brien	TV movie
