= Lorenzo Balducci =

Italian actor (born 1982)

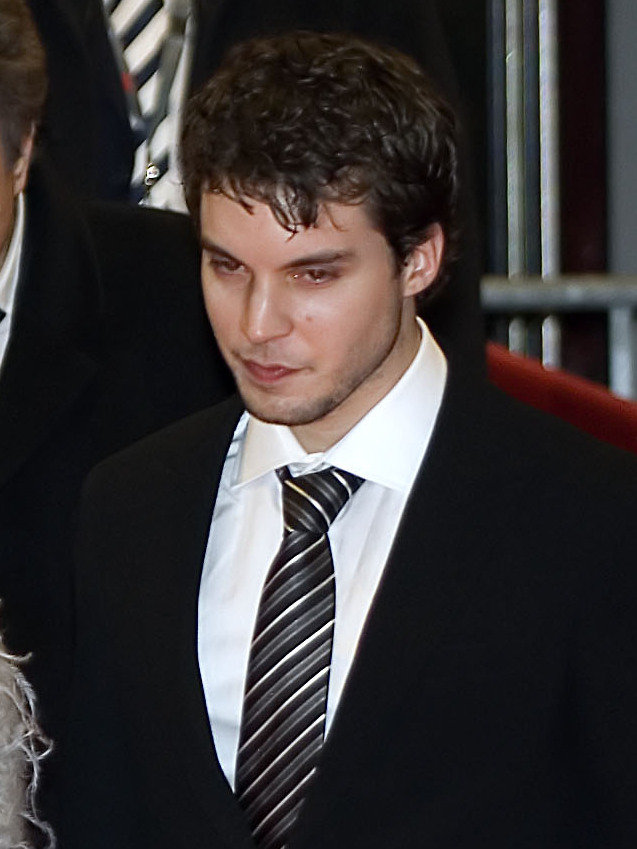
- Balducci in 2010
- Born: 4 September 1982 (age 43); Rome, Italy
- Occupation: Actor
- Years active: 2001–present

Lorenzo Balducci (born 4 September 1982) is an Italian actor. He has appeared in more than thirty films since 2001.

== Life and career ==
Balducci was born in Rome, Italy. He began taking acting classes when he was 14 and in November 2001 he made his stage debut as Romeo in a modern revival of William Shakespeare's Romeo and Juliet, also starring Italian actress Myriam Catania. He is openly gay.

After roles in a few TV commercials, he got a small part in Pupi Avati's The Knights of the Quest, that marked his film debut. Bigger roles quickly followed in films and television projects such as The Good Pope: Pope John XXIII, the acclaimed Incantato and the Italian box office hit Three Steps Over Heaven. His first lead role was in Luciano Melchionna's Gas, an indie drama that was selected at the inaugural Rome Film Festival and for which he won the Best Actor Award at the Chieti Film Festival.

He has appeared in more than thirty European films and television series since then, including Le héros de la famille, The Stone Council (both opposite Catherine Deneuve), André Téchiné's The Witnesses, Krzysztof Zanussi's Black Sun, Carlos Saura's I, Don Giovanni and the highly acclaimed Italian TV series Le cose che restano. In 2009 he received the Susan Batson Award for his performance in Due vite per caso at the San Francisco's NICE Film Festival.

Internationally, he starred in the Mexican romantic comedy 31 Días (opposite Karla Souza), the controversial Spanish film Estrella fugaz, the American TV movie Barabbas (starring Billy Zane) and the Italian TV series Mai per amore. He also appeared in the American independent comedy In search of Fellini (opposite Maria Bello), the acclaimed short film Snowflake (as Tracy Middendorf's love interest and for which he also served as an executive producer) and guest starred in the TV drama Medici: Masters of Florence.

In 2015 he was a member of the jury at the 30th Torino Gay & Lesbian Film Festival in Turin.

On stage, Balducci has starred in several productions of Dignità Autonome di Prostituzione in both Italy and Spain and, in 2017, he was part of the ensemble cast of Luciano Melchionna's Spoglia-Toy.

In 2018 he starred as John in 7 Miracles, one of the first feature-length cinematic VR experiences which premiered at the 26th Raindance Film Festival, winning the “VR Film of the Festival” grand jury award.

In 2019 he reprised his role in Luciano Melchionna's acclaimed play Spoglia-Toy and played Giulio Mieli in Gli anni amari, a biopic based on the life of Mario Mieli, a leading figure in the Italian gay movement of the 1970s.

In 2021 he starred in the stand-up comedy show Allegro, Non Troppo, originally produced to debut in 2020 but post-poned due to the COVID-19 pandemic. After the debut at Teatro dei Filodrammatici in Milan, the show run successfully at the Off-Off Theatre in Rome and then continued to tour around Italy.

In 2022 he directed his first music video, Per Dirsi Mai by Italian electro-pop violinist and singer H.E.R.

== Filmography ==
=== Film ===
| Year | Title | Role | Notes |
|---|---|---|---|
| 2001 | The Knights of the Quest | Son of Louis IX of France | |
| 2001 | The Good Pope: Pope John XXIII | Don Carlo | TV movie |
| 2001 | Stregati dalla luna | Alberto | |
| 2002 | El Alamein: The Line of Fire | Soldier | |
| 2003 | Incantato | Student | |
| 2003 | It Can’t Be All Our Fault | Manuel | |
| 2003 | Anime | Luca Anselmi | |
| 2004 | Three Steps Over Heaven | Chicco Antinori | |
| 2005 | Concorso di colpa | Stefano de Bernardi | |
| 2005 | Gas | Luca | Best Actor Award - Chieti Film Festival |
| 2006 | Le héros de la famille | Frankie | |
| 2006 | Ma l'amore... sì! | Carmelo Jorio | |
| 2007 | Le Concile de Pierre | L'inspecteur Frank Neves | |
| 2007 | Last Minute Marocco | Giacomo | |
| 2007 | The Witnesses | Steve | |
| 2007 | Black Sun | Manfredi | |
| 2008 | Evelyn | Luca | Short Film |
| 2008 | Così vanno le cose | Pierfrancesco | TV movie |
| 2008 | Vito ballava con le streghe | Vito | |
| 2009 | Ce n'è per tutti | Gianluca | Susan Batson Award - Best Actor - NICE Film Festival |
| 2009 | Evelyn | Luca | Short Film |
| 2009 | I, Don Giovanni | Lorenzo Da Ponte | |
| 2009 | One Life, Maybe Two | Matteo Carli | |
| 2009 | Brama | | Short Film (48 Hour Film Project) |
| 2011 | Rosso Vivo | Matteo | Short Film |
| 2011 | Bloody Sin | Johnny | |
| 2012 | Good As You | Adelchi | |
| 2012 | Barabbas | Lazarus of Bethany | TV movie |
| 2012 | 6 to 30 | Andrea | Short Film |
| 2013 | 31 días | Adam | |
| 2014 | Estel fugaç - Stella Cadente | Alfredo, l'assistant del Rei | |
| 2014 | Snowflake | Patrick | Short Film; Also Executive Producer |
| 2016 | L'intruso | Boyfriend | Short Film |
| 2016 | Non si ruba a casa dei ladri | Michele | |
| 2017 | In Search of Fellini | Angelo | |
| 2018 | 7 Miracles | John | Virtual Reality Film |
| 2019 | Gli anni amari | Giulio Mieli | |

=== Television ===
| Year | Title | Role | Notes |
|---|---|---|---|
| 2001 | Giorni da Leone | Carlo Carmignani | Mini Series; Series Regular |
| 2001 | Stiamo bene insieme | Alfredo | 1 episode |
| 2001 | Incantesimo | | 1 episode |
| 2002 | Carabinieri 2 | | 1 episode |
| 2002 | Il maresciallo Rocca | Luca Garrone | Episode 4x06: "L'uomo sbagliato" |
| 2003 | La squadra | | 1 episode |
| 2004 | Questo amore | Simone | Mini Series; Series Regular |
| 2005 | Padri e Figli | | 1 episode |
| 2005 | 48 ore | Andrea Billè | Series Regular (12 episodes) |
| 2006 | Giorni da Leone 2 | Carlo Carmignani | Mini Series; Series Regular |
| 2009 | Le cose che restano | Nino | Mini Series; Series Regular |
| 2012 | Questo nostro amore | Carlo | Series Regular (12 episodes) |
| 2015–2017 | Solo per amore | Claudio | Series Regular (18 episodes) |
| 2015 | Provaci ancora prof | Roberto | Episode 6x02: "Debiti Pericolosi" |
| 2016 | Medici: Masters of Florence | Mario de Medici | Episode 1x05: "Temptation" |
| 2018 | Don Matteo | Stefano Corini | Episode 11x23: "Tutta la vita" |

=== Music Videos ===
| Year | Title | Role | Director |
|---|---|---|---|
| 2001 | Il Telecomando | Matteo Bassi | Manetti Bros. |
| 2014 | As You Hope | Rhò | CUT |
| 2022 | Per dirsi mai | H.E.R. | Lorenzo Balducci |

== Theatre ==
| Year | Title | Role | Venue |
|---|---|---|---|
| 2001 | Romeo and Juliet | Romeo | Teatro Sala Uno, Rome |
| 2012 | Dignità autonome di prostituzione | Monologue "Bolla di piacere" | Teatro Bellini, Naples |
| 2015 | Dignità autonome di prostituzione | Monologue "Il colla" | Teatro Bellini, Naples |
| 2017 | Spoglia-Toy | Monologue | Accademia Bella Arti, Naples |
| 2017 | Dignità autonome di prostituzione | Maîtresse | FITT. Noves Dramaturgies Tarragona |
| 2019 | Spoglia-Toy | Monologue | Teatro Colosseo, Turin / Teatro Eliseo Rome |
| 2021–2022 | Allegro, non troppo | Stand-up Comedy | Off/Off Theatre, Rome & National Tour |
| 2022–2023 | Fake | Stand-up Comedy | Off/Off Theatre, Rome & National Tour |
| 2023–2024 | Tom à la ferme | Francis | Teatro Belli, Rome & Galleria Toledo, Naples |
| 2024 | Back to black | David | Off/Off Theatre, Rome |
