= White Wolves II: Legend of the Wild =

- Home video cover art
- Directed by: Terence H. Winkless
- Written by: Dylan Kelsey Hadley
- Produced by: Julie Corman
- Starring: Elizabeth Berkley; Ele Keats; Jeremy London; Corin Nemec; Ernie Reyes Jr.; Justin Whalin
- Cinematography: John B. Aronson
- Edited by: John Gilbert
- Music by: Gene Ober
- Production company: Concorde/New Horizons
- Distributed by: New Horizons Home Video (Home Video); Disney Channel (TV Premiere)
- Release dates: March 14, 1996 (TV Premiere); June 1996 (Video Premiere)
- Running time: 83 minutes
- Country: United States
- Language: English

White Wolves II: Legend of the Wild is a 1996 American coming-of-age survival drama film directed by Terence H. Winkless and starring Ele Keats, Elizabeth Berkley and Jeremy London. It is the second straight-to-video sequel to A Cry in the Wild. The plot follows a group of troubled teenagers trying to survive in the wilderness of the Cascade Mountains.

The family film premiered on the Disney Channel before its direct-to-video release.

== Plot ==
A group of troubled teenagers reluctantly accept to aid wolf researcher Ben Harris in order to clean their records from their law-breaking deeds. Graffiti artist "Miami" Steve, snobby daddy's girl Crystal and surly Beri join Ben in his mission into the Idaho wilderness to garner a count of wolves and to retrieve a hidden camera.

Shortly after their trek begins, the foursome see a mother wolf and her two baby cubs. During their journey into the woods, the group meets two paragliders brothers, boaster Mason and introverted Jeff. That night, Ben tells the group a personal story about a white wolf saving his life (revealing himself as Benny from the previous film).

When Mason begins to flirt with Beri, Crystal steals his altimeter out of jealousy. This leads to an almost-deadly paragliding accident for Mason, who loses control during a flight and crashes violently into the woods. In an attempt to take Mason to town, Ben is seriously injured as well.

Left alone, the teens battle whitewater rapids, deadly predators, and ultimately themselves in order to save Ben and Mason and survive. In her search for help, Beri finally sees the white wolf as it leads her out from a cave.

Ben and Mason are eventually rescued by a helicopter but the teens decide to stay in the woods a little longer in order to complete Ben's task and retrieve the last camera.

== Cast ==
- Elizabeth Berkley as Crystal
- Ele Keats as Beri
- Jeremy London as Mason
- Corin Nemec as Ben Harris
- Ernie Reyes Jr. as Steve
- Justin Whalin as Jeff

== Production ==
After the commercial success of White Wolves: A Cry in the Wild II (that sold more than 60,000 videos), New Horizons's Julie Corman decided to produce a sequel.

On April 19, 1994, Variety announced a third installment in the White Wolves series, tentatively titled A Cry in the Wild II, with Terence H. Winkless set to direct. Winkless was a frequent Corman's collaborator, having directed several projects for the Concorde/New Horizons label.

The film was produced under the New Horizons Home Video Family Fare Division, the newly-formed family-oriented line of Roger Corman's production company. According to New Horizons Home Video's president Jonathan Fernandez, "there was a huge demand for family films that was not being met" and the recent success of White Wolves: A Cry in the Wild II (released theatrically and on video by Concorde, the predecessor to New Horizons) had proven that there was a market for direct-to-video family films. New Horizon's family division was created in 1990 and by 1994 was responsible for one quarter of its total output.

Based on a screenplay by Dylan Kelsey Hadley entitled Cry of the White Wolf, the film entered production in Spring 1994.

=== Casting ===
Casting familiar TV and film faces had proven successful on the previous two films so casting director Jan Glazer was instructed to look for popular young actors. Glazer reportedly saw thousands of actors during the casting process.

Corin Nemec was known for playing the title character in FOX sitcom Parker Lewis Can't Lose and Elizabeth Berkley was one of the stars of NBC's Saved by the Bell (along with Mark-Paul Gosselaar, who starred in the previous Wolves installment). Both hit series had ended in 1993 but had successfully been in syndication since then.

Justin Whalin was in theaters starring in John Waters' Serial Mom and had just booked a regular role in the popular series Lois & Clark: The New Adventures of Superman when he auditioned for the role of Jeff.

Jeremy London had played Nathan on the critically acclaimed drama series I'll Fly Away and was about to start filming the Alicia Silverstone's vehicle The Babysitter.

Actress and former Elite model Ele Keats had a leading role in the Disney's musical Newsies (along with David Moscow, who starred in the previous Wolves film) and also had appeared in the 1993 drama Alive as Ethan Hawke's sister.
Ernie Reyes Jr. was the lead of the 1993 family comedy Surf Ninjas, also starring Leslie Nielsen and Rob Schneider in one of his first leading roles.

=== Filming ===
Filming began in July 1994 in the Fremont County, at the Idaho's portion of the Greater Yellowstone Ecosystem, with the support of the Idaho Film Bureau, under a budget of around $1.5 million. Shooting took place mainly in the Caribou-Targhee National Forest that borders Yellowstone National Park. Other sequences were shot in the Beaverhead-Deerlodge National Forest.

The summer shooting overlapped with the production of Saved by the Bell: Wedding in Las Vegas and that prevented actress Elizabeth Berkley from being more prominently featured in the latter film. Berkley was also in the process of auditioning for the lead in Showgirls and kept practicing pole dancing in the woods in case she had to go back for another interview. After a few days of shooting, she was called and told she had gotten the part. "I was just sobbing. I couldn't even speak. There'll never be another moment quite as sweet as that, ever" said the actress.

All the animals were provided by Steve Martin's Working Wildlife, an animal-training company based in Los Angeles. Two trainers, Dale Snipes and Nancy Taylor, worked together for the scenes featuring the wolf cubs and the mother wolf. The sequence of the bear attack was filmed in cuts, with the bear and the cubs never on set at the same time. For risky shots with interaction between animals and actors, the trainers acted as doubles, wearing the characters' costumes.

The cave scene with Ele Keats following the white wolf was shot in Los Angeles at the Griffith Park. For the scene, a perimeter was built with rocks to prevent a family of mice featured in a shot to wander off inside the cave.

== Release ==
Despite the success of A Cry in the Wild and White Wolves: A Cry in the Wild II in their limited theatrical run, Concorde/New Horizons discarded the chance to show the film in theaters, having found video and foreign sales more profitable. After changing the title from Cry of the White Wolf to White Wolves II: Legend of the Wild, the company submitted the film to the MPAA and received a PG rating.

The film was sold to the Disney Channel in 1995, before its video premiere. The pay television network premiered the film in primetime on March 14, 1996, with a first set of repeats on March 22, March 23 and March 30.

New Horizons Home Video released the film on videocassette in June 1996. Due to the Showgirls popularity, Elizabeth Berkley's name was largely displayed in the video cover, followed by the names of Corin Nemec, Justin Whalin and Jeremy London. On the back cover, the cast was referred to as "today's hottest young stars".
The title sold around 50,000 videocassettes and recouped $2.7 million in video sales alone during its first year out.

The DVD was released in 2000 in a 4-disc set including the four White Wolves films: A Cry in the Wild, White Wolves: A Cry in the Wild II, White Wolves II: Legend of the Wild and the newly released White Wolves III: Cry of the White Wolf.

=== Awards ===
The film won the Award of Merit for "Outstanding Achievement" by the Academy of Family Film and Television in 1996. The same year, the organization named Julie Corman "Producer of the Year" for her achievements.
