= List of Hawkeye episodes =

List of Hawkeye episodes may refer to:

- List of Hawkeye (1994 TV series) episodes – 1994–95 Leatherstocking Tales series by Stephen J. Cannell
- List of Hawkeye (miniseries) episodes – 2021 Marvel Cinematic Universe series
