= List of programmes broadcast by Steel =

This is a list of television programs broadcast by Steel in Italy.

== Television series ==
- 48 ore
- The Big Bang Theory
- Buffy the Vampire Slayer
- Chuck
- Codice rosso
- Delta Team
- Distretto di Polizia
- E-Ring
- HeliCops
- Homicide: Life on the Street
- La Femme Nikita
- Mike & Molly
- Notruf Hafenkante
- Psych
- RIS Delitti Imperfetti
- Rookie Blue
- The Sleep of Reason
- Two and a Half Men
- The West Wing

== Sci Fi / Syfy Universal ==
- Battlestar Galactica
- Being Human UK
- Caprica
- Day Break
- Eleventh Hour
- Fringe
- Ghost Hunters International
- Grimm
- Haven
- Heroes
- Heroes Unmasked
- Moonlight
- Legend Quest
- Sanctuary
- SeaQuest DSV
- Sliders
- Smallville
- Space: 1999
- Star Trek: Enterprise
- Star Trek: The Original Series
- Supernatural
- Surface
- Terminator: The Sarah Connor Chronicles
- Tripping the Rift
- UFO
