= Public domain (disambiguation) =

Public domain refers to works whose intellectual property rights have expired, have been forfeited, or are inapplicable.

Public domain may also refer to:

- Public domain (land), lands maintained by a public entity that cannot be sold, since they are considered to belong to the whole community
- Public land
- Public Domain (film), 2003 Canadian film
- Public Domain (band), a Scottish dance music act
- Public Domain (album), a 2000 album by Dave Alvin
- The Public Domain (film), a 2015 drama film
- "Public Domain", a song by Poppy from Empty Hands

== See also ==
- Public land
- Commons:Help:Public domain, for help with tagging Wikimedia Commons files as public domain
- Public record, widely known or otherwise widely available information, sometimes erroneously described with the term "public domain" from intellectual property law
- Public-access television, a form of non-commercial mass media
