= Dying to Belong =

1997 television film directed by William A. Graham

- DVD cover
- Genre: Drama
- Written by: Ron McGee
- Directed by: William A. Graham
- Starring: Hilary Swank; Sarah Chalke; Jenna Von Oy; Laurel Holloman; Jennifer Warren; GregAlan Williams; Tracy Middendorf; Isabella Hofmann; Mark-Paul Gosselaar
- Music by: Michael Tavera
- Country of origin: United States
- Original language: English

Production
- Executive producers: Jean Abounader; Robert M. Sertner; Frank von Zerneck
- Producers: Gregory Prange; Randy Sutter
- Cinematography: Robert Steadman
- Editor: Scott Powell
- Running time: 120 minutes
- Production companies: Hallmark Entertainment; Von Zerneck Sertner Films

Original release
- Network: NBC
- Release: February 24, 1997

Dying to Belong is a 1997 American television film directed by William A. Graham.

== Plot ==
University freshman Lisa Connors has high expectations for a position at the campus newspaper. Her mother pushes her to join Pi Gamma Beta, the most prominent sorority on campus, while her first day. Her plans, however, are derailed when Shelby, a friend of hers, is killed on initiation night as a result of a typical hazing gone wrong at the same sorority. Demanding answers, Lisa tries to find answers and learns that the sorority has a secretive troubled past and how secretive and dirty the Greek system really is.

Lisa tricks the sorority leader and another sister into going to the Bell Tower, where Lisa plays a tape recording of the other girl's account of her near death from Pi Gamma Beta's hazing.

As Lisa, her mother, and Steven walk past Greek Row, the Pi Gamma Betas are all removing their belongings, possibly because Pi Gamma Beta's charter has been terminated. Lisa's mother admits that she enjoyed being in Pi Gamma Beta because of the people, not the actual sorority. Lisa's relationship with Steven endures.

== Cast ==
- Hilary Swank as Lisa Connors
- Sarah Chalke as Drea Davenport
- Mark-Paul Gosselaar as Steven Tyler
- Jenna Von Oy as Shelby Blake
- Laurel Holloman as Shannon
- Jennifer Warren as Dean Curtis
- GregAlan Williams as Carl Ridgeley
- Tracy Middendorf as Kim Lessing
- Isabella Hofmann as Gwen Connors

== Reception ==
The film was generally negatively received. Variety called it unconvincing and spoke negatively about the cast and crew: "No one's doing much acting, and director Graham seems hung up on the premise that the telepic's serious. Swank's appealing, but the character's a blank; Gosselaar gives his role the old college try, but nothing's there. Von Oy, suggesting there could be more to her part than is apparent, doesn't find it". It continued: "Camerawork and editing are perfunctory, and Roger S. Crandal's production design's conventional. Michael Tavera's score is monotonous".

The New York Times was more approving of Swank's acting, saying that she "gives an excellent account of herself in this made-for-TV movie".

== Remake ==
In August 2021, a remake of the film was greenlighted by Lifetime and premiered in the fall of October 9, 2021 with Shannen Doherty, Favour Onwuka and Jenika Rose starring and Gail Harvey directing.

=== Cast ===
- Shannen Doherty as Katherine
- Favour Onwuka as Olivia
- Jenika Rose as Riley
- Veronica Long as Jasmine
- Heidi Bauman as Paige
- Madeleine Steuart as Tory
- Jackie Wong as Mya
- Synto Misati as Nate
- Sebastian Greaves as Logan
- William Gerhard Matzhold as Gabriel
- Karen Holness as Georgia
- Jamila Hall as Dahlia
- Parveen Dosanjh as Detective Singh
