= Rodney A. Grant =

Native American actor

Rodney Arnold Grant
- Born: March 9, 1959 (age 67); Macy, Nebraska, United States
- Occupation: Actor

Rodney Arnold Grant (born March 9, 1959) is a Native American (Omaha) actor. He is best known for his role as "Wind In His Hair" (Lakota: Pahíŋ Otȟáte) in the 1990 film Dances with Wolves.

Grant was raised on the Omaha Reservation in Macy, Nebraska. After his biological parents abandoned him, his grandparents raised him from six months of age until 1982. Besides Dances with Wolves, he has also appeared in films such as Ghosts of Mars, Wild Wild West, Geronimo: An American Legend, White Wolves III: Cry of the White Wolf, Wagons East, The Substitute, War Party, and Powwow Highway. He portrayed "Chingachgook" in the syndicated television series Hawkeye and also had guest roles in television series such as Due South, Two, and the Stargate SG-1 (episode "Spirits"). He also portrayed the famous warrior Crazy Horse in the 1991 television movie Son of the Morning Star.

Grant is a member of the Omaha tribe of Nebraska. He has been very active in youth activities and had served on the Native American Advisory Board for the Boys and Girls Clubs of America. He has five grown children, three from a previous marriage, and two from previous relationships. He now lives in southern California.

== Filmography ==
- 1988 War Party as The Crow (as Rodney Grant)
- 1989 Powwow Highway as Brave On Horse
- 1990 Dances with Wolves as Wind In His Hair
- 1991 The Doors as Patron At Barney's
- 1991 Son of the Morning Star (TV Mini-Series) as Crazy Horse
- 1992 Lakota Moon (TV Movie) as Kills First
- 1992 Genghis Khan as Jamuga
- 1993 Geronimo: An American Legend as Mangas
- 1993 Dark Blood as Indian
- 1994 F.T.W. as Bucky Miller
- 1994 Wagons East as Little Feather / Big Snake That Makes Women Faint
- 1996 The Substitute as Johnny Glades
- 1997 Stolen Women, Captured Hearts (TV Movie) as Waxanhdo
- 1999 The Jack Bull (TV Movie) as Billy Redwood
- 1999 Wild, Wild West as Hudson
- 2000 White Wolves III: Cry of the White Wolf as Quentin
- 2001 Ghosts of Mars as Tres
- 2002 Just a Dream as Cecil Running Bear
- 2005 Don't Come Knocking as Wild-Eye
- 2010 Genghis Khan: The Story of a Lifetime as Jamuga
- 2011 Shouting Secrets as Street Chief
- 2012 Dark Blood as Indian #3

== Television ==
- 1990 The Making of 'Dances with Wolves' as Himself (TV Short documentary)
- 1994–1995 Hawkeye as Chingachgook (22 episodes)
- 1995 Legend - episode - Revenge of the Herd as Towashie
- 1996 Due South - series 2 ep6 "Mask" as Eric
- 1997 Big Guns Talk: The Story of the Western as Himself (TV Movie documentary)
- 1998 Stargate SG-1 - episode - Spirits as Tonané
- 2003 The District - episode - The Voice Inside as Tommy Morgan
