= White Dwarf (film) =

- Promotional image
- Genre: Science fiction; Thriller
- Written by: Bruce Wagner
- Directed by: Peter Markle
- Starring: Paul Winfield; Neal McDonough; CCH Pounder; Beverley Mitchell; David St. James; Ele Keats; James Morrison
- Music by: Stewart Copeland
- Country of origin: United States
- Original language: English

Production
- Executive producers: Robert Halmi Sr.; Bruce Wagner; Francis Ford Coppola
- Producer: Deepak Nayar
- Cinematography: Phaedon Papamichael
- Editor: Patrick McMahon
- Running time: 90 minutes
- Production companies: RHI Entertainment; Elemental Films; American Zoetrope

Original release
- Network: Fox
- Release: May 23, 1995

White Dwarf is a 1995 American science fiction thriller television film directed by Peter Markle and starring Paul Winfield, Neal McDonough, CCH Pounder, Beverley Mitchell, David St. James, Ele Keats, and James Morrison. It was written by Bruce Wagner, who also executive produced with Robert Halmi Sr. and Francis Ford Coppola for RHI Entertainment, Elemental Films, and American Zoetrope. It is about an arrogant medical student Driscoll Rampart (Neal McDonough) in the year 3040 who is completing his internship on Rusta, a far-flung rural planet, where he learns about healing from the experienced Dr. Akana (Paul Winfield).

Originally intended as a television pilot, the film first aired on the Fox Network on May 23, 1995. While expected to be well received, the film instead garnered generally negative reception. Negative reception notwithstanding, it received an ASC Award nomination for Outstanding Achievement in Cinematography.

== Plot ==
In the year 3040, New York medical student Driscoll Rampart (Neal McDonough) arrives from Earth to the planet of Rusta for a six-month internship at the Light Side clinic run by Dr. Akada (Paul Winfield). Rampart's ambition is to eventually set up a private practice in Manhattan on Park Avenue.

Due to Rusta being tidally locked to its primary White dwarf star, it is divided into contrasting halves of day and night with the halves separated by a wall. The planet's two sides are locked in a civil war. Due to the major differences between the light side of the planet and the dark side, the humans have evolved differently. The differences between the two cultures leave Rampart in a state of wonder.

The light half has aspects like the old American West, the Victorian era, and some modern technologies, so 19th-century items like stagecoaches coexist with 20th-century radios. The lighted side is terraformed by huge spheres named “regulators." The regulators are starting to have problems.

The dark side has a medieval, feudal kingdom led by a King (Robert Cornthwaite).

Near the border lies a jail under the control of an alien named Osh (Chip Heller). Osh secretes an enzyme into the prisoner's mouths each decade that prevents them from aging. Osh's most high-profile detainee is Lady X (Katy Boyer), convicted of releasing a plague on Earth.

Dr Akada was from the dark part of the planet. He learned a great deal about medicine while working in the jail. Dr. Akada tells his medical intern that the planet Rusta is “a sentient place”, implying that the planet itself is alive.

== Cast ==
- Paul Winfield as Dr. Akada
- Neal McDonough as Dr. Driscoll Rampart
- Ele Keats as Ariel
- CCH Pounder as Nurse Shabana
- David St. James as King Joist's Royal Guard
- James Morrison as Peter
- Katy Boyer as Lady X, Immortal Prisoner
- Kevin Brophy as Orderly
- Marsha Dietlein as Emma
- Michael McGrady as Lieutenant Strake
- Robert O. Cornthwaite as King Joist of The Dark Side
- Roy Brocksmith as Guv'ner Twist
- Thomas F. Duffy as Parasite Man
- Giuseppe Andrews as Never The Shifter
- Beverley Mitchell as XuXu, Older Twin
- Time Winters as The David
- Chip Heller as Osh, Warden of The Keep
- John Dennis Johnston as Morgus, Osh's Assistant
- Gary Watkins as Marshall Bardaker
- Maggie Baird as Scarred Cultist
- Ralph Drischell as Dr. Gulpha, King Joist's Advisor
- Kirk Ward as Samuel
- Tara Graham as XaXa, Younger Twin
- Maya McLaughlin as Armanda, Rampart's Late Wife
- Tycho Thal as Twist's Servant

== Production ==
Paul Winfield willingly accepted a pay cut to be part of this film. Said Winfield, "I thought it was a (feature film). I'm a real sci-fi nut. Even as a kid, that was my pleasure, reading science fiction. I read Heinlein, the big anthologies, Asimov. I've always liked science-fiction movies too. I like being in them, just to see how they do it." He expanded that during filming, the film "sort of started to have a life of its own."

Bruce Wagner claims his inspiration was drawn from the cover-art of science-fiction novels. Having a limited budget, the project was shot at multiple locations within 40 miles of Los Angeles: scenes of the prison were constructed in the same location where Los Angeles Herald-Examiner once housed its printing presses; outdoor scenes were shot at a ranch location north of LA; scenes of Dr. Akada's clinic were done at school in Arcadia, California; and the film's sea scenes were shot off the coast of Malibu with the ocean's red tint added in post production.

== Releases ==
The film originally aired May 23, 1995 on the Fox Network.

== Reception ==
The film was reviewed as having promise, but received generally negative reviews. The New York Times wrote that the film began with a "shamelessly incredible premise" which "takes off into a wholly unbelievable stratosphere". They also observed that the film's collection of protagonists and antagonists do nothing to improve it, and while keeping track of them is "often exasperating", it "is hardly boring. The film's offers decent special effects, but the soundtrack by Stewart Copeland "is curiously inept", and its actors "give readings as lifeless as departure announcements for the Long Island Rail Road."

TV Guide granted the film offered a "broad panorama" with a "rich, detailed setting" but the setting was unable to "compensate for the lack of a coherent plot." They expanded that the film's representation of a split culture "is evenly handled, with neither side portrayed as wholly good or bad", but concluded that "the film's potential is badly marred by an incoherent plot which is unable to sustain the setting and characters. Dramatic conflicts are practically non-existent and the various plots are given too little time to develop." The film has action, but it is not relevant to the thin plot, and what few moments of potential momentum is lost with characters "who discover things too soon or resolve things too easily."

Baltimore Sun wrote that the film's premise of Northern Exposure set on a distant planet and dressed in the language of myth and fairy tale was "lame, tedious, tired, obvious." The film failed to live up to its potential, was "not quirky, clever, kicky or imaginative", and is determined as a "careless and uninspired attempt to rework the hero quest" from Francis Ford Coppola (Apocalypse Now) and Bruce Wagner (Wild Palms), "two executive producers capable of much better work".

Chicago Tribune noted Bruce Wagner joining with Francis Ford Coppola to create White Dwarf as a two-hour TV-movie and pilot for a possible series. They note the differences between the light and dark side cultures, with the light half mixing various culture's styles and periods, "with elements of the Old West, Victorian era and 20th century, including stagecoaches and radios. The dark half is medieval, with a king, a princess and an evil knight. They noted the film having "some spectacular computer-generated effects (especially the wall between the light and dark sides)", but according to Bruce Wagner, that was not an aspect upon which he wished to concentrate. Said Wagner, "The wall looks hot. The stuff that we did looks great, but I wanted to keep it limited. I didn't care so much about it. I wanted to create a template for our pilot where things were more emotional. I loved the stuff between Osh and Lady X. I'm enthralled every time I see those little scenes with Wagner playing in the background, this two-ton walrus alien obsessing over this gorgeous, ancient woman. And this whole scene where (Akada and Rampart) are examining her and she says, `Do you know what it's like to live forever?' I just love that stuff. When she elucidates what it is like to live forever... I really find that moving every time I hear her do that. There are little side stories that, to me, are really cool."

New York Daily News wrote that Bruce Wagner's "Futuristic White Dwarf is a fuzzy dud." Their complaint was toward how illogical it was that in a time when interstellar travel was commonplace, dependence on stagecoaches and horseback was nonsense, and the "medical facilities, equipment and medications seem as primitive as the transportation system." They concluded the "participation of Francis Ford Coppola and Robert Halmi Sr. as executive producers with Wagner, as well as a fine production team, still doesn't make this movie worth more than about the 30 seconds it takes to watch one of Fox' promos for it."

== Awards and nominations ==
- Received a 1995 ASC Awards nomination for Outstanding Achievement in Cinematography in Movies of the Week or Pilot
