= Justin Whalin =

American actor

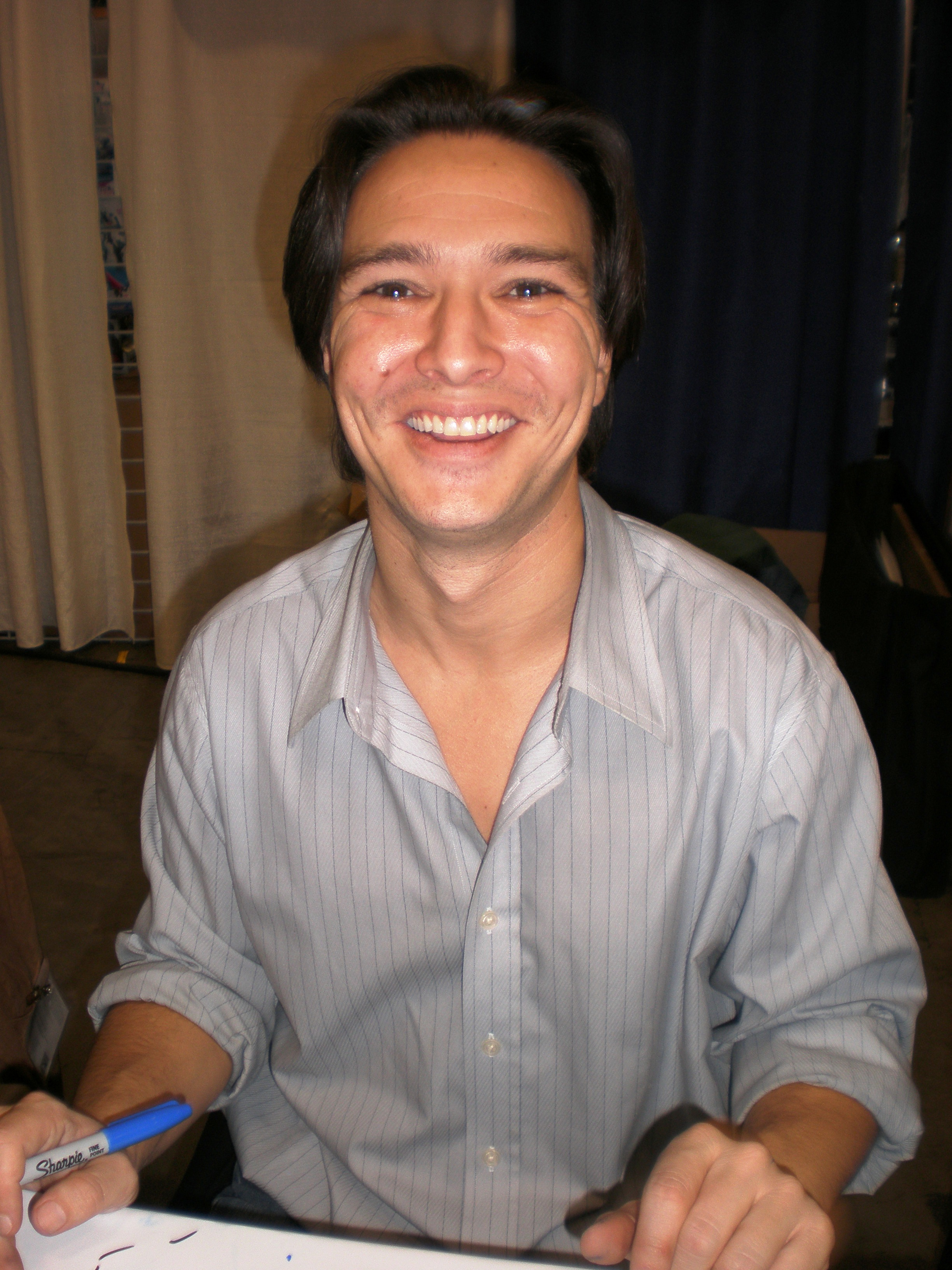
- Whalin at WonderCon 2009
- Born: Justin Garrett Whalin; September 6, 1974 (age 52); San Francisco, California, U.S.
- Education: American Conservatory Theater
- Occupations: Actor, teacher
- Years active: 1987–2009
- Spouse: Reina Flynn (m. 2006; div. 2009)

Justin Garrett Whalin (born September 6, 1974) is an American drama teacher, administrator, and former actor. He portrayed the teenage Andy Barclay in Child's Play 3, Ridley Freeborn in Dungeons & Dragons, and Jimmy Olsen in the American television series Lois & Clark: The New Adventures of Superman.

== Early life ==
Whalin was born in the Sunset District of San Francisco, California. His mother, Terry Villanueva, is a teacher and school administrator who owns and operates two L.A. area schools: The Learning Castle and La Cañada Preparatory. His father, Craig Whalin, is a real estate appraiser. His parents divorced when he was seven years old and both remarried. He has a younger half-brother and an older stepbrother and stepsister.

He studied acting at the American Conservatory Theater (A.C.T.) in San Francisco, and attended Lowell High School. After years of commuting between Los Angeles and San Francisco, he and his mother relocated to L.A. permanently when he was fifteen years old. He completed his high school education through U.C. Berkeley's homeschooling program.

== Career ==
Whalin worked as an actor from the age of eleven, when he appeared in a production of the play The Little Prince at San Francisco's Victoria Theatre. His first TV role was on General Hospital, after he caught the attention of a casting director who was giving an acting class. He starred in the 1993 CBS Schoolbreak Special production Other Mothers, for which he won a Daytime Emmy. He went on to star in Miracle at Midnight opposite Mia Farrow and Sam Waterston. He also auditioned to play Billy Loomis in Scream.

Whalin was cast as the young Daily Planet photographer Jimmy Olsen in the TV series Lois & Clark: The New Adventures of Superman from 1994 to 1997. Whalin said that initially the only fan mail he got on the show was from people complaining that he was not as good as Michael Landes (who played Olsen during the show's first season), and that it was not until around his fifth episode that he began to see an even mix of positive and negative fan reactions. He enjoyed the role, though he said it often seemed limited to delivering exposition; a reoccurring motif of the series was that Lois and/or Clark would ask Jimmy to research a suspicious person or organization, and in a later scene Jimmy would rattle off the requested names, dates, addresses, and backstory. When Whalin was first cast, the producers had planned a Jimmy Olsen-centric episode in which Jimmy heads to South America to look for his long-lost father, but it was never produced, though the show did get Olsen-centric episodes in season 3 ("The Dad Who Came in From the Cold") and 4 ("AKA Superman").

Whalin quit acting in 2009 to work as a social studies/drama teacher and administrator at The Learning Castle and La Cañada Preparatory, his mother's exclusive schools in the Los Angeles area.

== Filmography ==
=== Film ===
Year	Title	Role	Notes
1988	The Dead Pool	Jason	
1990	Denial	Jason	
1991	Child's Play 3	Andy Barclay	
1993	Murder of Innocence	Phil Andrew	
1994	Serial Mom	Scotty Barnhill	
1995	White Wolves II: Legend of the Wild	Jeff	
1996	Susie Q	Zach Sands	
1996	Jimmy Zip	Billy	Short
1997	Academy Boyz	Jeffrey Wagner	
2000	For the Cause	Sutherland	
2000	Dungeons & Dragons	Ridley Freeborn	
2003	Roulette	Bobby	Short
2003	Slammed	Jeff	
2005	Blood of Beasts	Eric	
2006	National Lampoon's Dorm Daze 2	Foosball	Direct-to-video
2009	Super Capers	Ed Gruberman	
2009	The House That Jack Built	Father Joe	
2009	Off the Ledge	Hopper Jackson	

=== Television ===
Year	Title	Role	Notes
1987–1988	General Hospital	A.J. Quartermaine	
1988	CBS Summer Playhouse	Johnny	Episode: "Silent Whisper"
1989	One of the Boys	Nick Lukowski	6 episodes
1989	Charles in Charge	Anthony	6 episodes
1989	Mr. Belvedere	Eric	Episode: "Big"
1989–1990	The Wonder Years	Henchman / Mark Kovinsky	Episode: "Fate"; Episode: "The Cost of Living"
1990–1991	Blossom	William Zimmerman / Jordan Taylor / Jimmy	Episode: "Pilot"; Episode: "The Geek"; Episode: "Second Base"
1991	Santa Barbara		
1991	Perfect Harmony	Taylor Bradshaw	TV movie
1992	The Young Riders	Adrian Dawkins	Episode: "The Sacrifice"
1993	The Fire Next Time	Paul Morgan	2 episodes
1993	CBS Schoolbreak Special	Chaz Havelik / Will Jurgenson	Episode: "Crosses on the Lawn"; Episode: "Other Mothers"
1993	It Had to Be You	David Quinn	6 episodes
1994–1997	Lois & Clark: The New Adventures of Superman	Jimmy Olsen	65 episodes
1998	The Wonderful World of Disney	Henrik Koster	Episode "Miracle at Midnight"

== Awards ==
List of awards and nominations
Year	Award	Category	Recipient	Result
1991	Young Artist Award	Best Young Actor in a Daytime Series	Santa Barbara	Nominated
1991	Young Artist Award	Best Young Actor Guest Starring or Recurring Role in a TV Series	Blossom	Nominated
1991	Young Artist Award	Best Young Actor Starring in a Cable Special	Perfect Harmony	Nominated
1991	Saturn Award	Best Performance by a Younger Actor	Child's Play 3	Nominated
1994	Daytime Emmy Award	Outstanding Performer in a Children's Special	CBS Schoolbreak Special (Episode: "Other Mothers")	Won
1996	ALMA Award	Outstanding Television Series Actor in a Crossover Role	Lois & Clark: The New Adventures of Superman	Nominated

Preceded by Michael Landes	Actors to portray Jimmy Olsen; 1994–1997	Succeeded by Sam Huntington
