= Stephen Meadows =

American actor

- Born: Joseph Stephen Meadows Jr. 4 November 1950 (age 75); Atlanta, Georgia, U.S.
- Spouse: Leeza Gibbons (1991–2005)
- Website: http://www.StephenMeadows.com

Stephen Meadows (born 4 November 1950) is an American actor, architect and inventor.

== Biography ==
Meadows was born in 1950, in Atlanta, Georgia.

He has appeared in movies and television shows such as The End of Innocence with Dyan Cannon, Ultraviolet with Esai Morales, V.I. Warshawski with Kathleen Turner, Santa Barbara (as Peter Flint, from 1984 to 1985) and One Life to Live (as Patrick London from, 1986–87). He played a role in the TV movie A Cry in the Wild as Brad Robeson. Meadows has appeared in numerous feature films and TV movies, including a notable role in Sunstroke with Jane Seymour. He is also an architect and inventor of the Parabounce.

Meadows taught Architecture and design at San Francisco State University, Santa Monica College, City College of San Francisco and the Rudolph Schaeffer School of Design.

He married television presenter Leeza Gibbons on Valentine's Day 1991. Together they have two children, Troy and Nathan. They divorced in 2005, citing irreconcilable differences.
