= The Substitute =

1996 film directed by Robert Mandel

- Theatrical release poster
- Directed by: Robert Mandel
- Written by: Roy Frumkes; Rocco Simonelli; Alan Ormsby
- Produced by: Morrie Eisenman; Jim Steele
- Starring: Tom Berenger; Ernie Hudson; Diane Venora; Glenn Plummer; Marc Anthony; Luis Guzmán; William Forsythe
- Cinematography: Bruce Surtees
- Edited by: Alex Mackie
- Music by: Gary Chang
- Production companies: Live Entertainment; Substitute Productions
- Distributed by: Orion Pictures
- Release date: April 19, 1996
- Running time: 114 minutes
- Country: United States
- Languages: English; Spanish
- Box office: $14.8 million

The Substitute is a 1996 American action thriller film directed by Robert Mandel and starring Tom Berenger, Ernie Hudson, Diane Venora, Marc Anthony, William Forsythe, Raymond Cruz and Luis Guzmán. It was filmed at Miami Senior High School.

== Plot ==
Jonathan Shale is a Vietnam War veteran and mercenary. After a botched covert operation in Cuba, he returns home to Miami and surprises his girlfriend, Jane Hetzko, at her apartment. She is a schoolteacher at inner-city Columbus High School, an institution with a gang problem.

Hetzko is particularly disliked by Juan Lacas, leader of the Kings of Destruction (KOD) gang. While jogging one morning, she is attacked and has her leg broken. Jane and Shale believe this to be related to the KOD, which prompts the latter to go undercover as an Ivy League-educated, government-affiliated substitute teacher for his girlfriend's class.

Shale arrives at Columbus High School and is taken aback by the poor conditions. He is unable to control his class of poorly educated and poorly behaved students on the first day but decides to use his street smarts and military tactics to gain the upper hand. Soon he takes command by displaying his combat self-defense techniques when students attack him. When they go to the school nurse for help with their injuries, the principal, Claude Rolle, warns Shale that corporal punishment is forbidden, but he claims self-defense.

During his time teaching, Shale gains the respect of the students when he bonds with them over the similarities between his war experiences and their involvement in petty crime and gangs. He also befriends fellow schoolteacher Darrell Sherman and crosses paths with Juan Lacas. Shale discovers that Juan orchestrated the attack on Jane and is secretly working with Rolle to distribute cocaine around Miami for a major narcotics ring. Shale and his team raid a drug deal, using the stolen money to buy music and sports equipment and claim that it is a donation to the school.

While speaking with Shale during the school equipment "donation," Sherman initially denies his discovery, accusing him of trying to smear Rolle for racist reasons. Later, Sherman and a student, Lisa, inadvertently witness the drugs being loaded into one of the school buses as they're leaving campus. While being chased by the dealers, Sherman hides Lisa under the stairwell and tells her to warn Shale and Jane. He then creates a distraction, and Rolle executes him.

The next day, while Jerome (one of Shale's students) is running the class while Shale is out, Lisa comes to class looking for Shale. When she stresses the importance of speaking to him, Jerome takes her to Jane's house, where he knows Shale will return.

Because they're aware of Shale's connection to Jane, Rolle sends Juan after her. Shale goes to save Jane at her apartment but is overcome by the gang members. When Jane's landlord distracts the group by knocking on her door, Shale breaks free and kills all the gang members except Juan, who uses Jane as a human shield. Jerome shoots Juan from behind, ending the standoff. After she frees herself, Lisa tells Shale what she saw at the school with Mr. Sherman.

Now understanding that the school is being used as a distribution center, Shale and four mercenary colleagues deploy to the school grounds to confront their enemies. Ultimately, the team kills all of the dealers, their mercs, and Rolle, but only Shale and colleague Joey Six survive. As the credits begin to roll, they walk away from the school grounds, discussing future operations as substitute teachers.

== Cast ==
- Tom Berenger as Jonathan Shale
- Ernie Hudson as Claude Rolle
- Diane Venora as Jane Hetzko
- Glenn Plummer as Darrell Sherman
- Marc Anthony as Juan Lacas
- Cliff De Young as Wolfson
- Sharron Corley as Jerome
- Richard Brooks as Wellman
- Raymond Cruz as Joey Six
- Rodney A. Grant as Johnny Glades
- Luis Guzmán as Rem
- Willis Sparks as John Janus
- Peggy Pope as Hannah Dillon
- María Celedonio as Lisa
- Vincent Laresca as Rodriguez
- William Forsythe as Hollan

== Soundtrack ==
A soundtrack containing hip hop music was released on April 9, 1996, by Priority Records. It peaked at #90 on the Billboard 200 and #18 on the Top R&B/Hip-Hop Albums.

== Release ==
The Substitute premiered in New York and Los Angeles on April 19, 1996.

=== Home media ===
The movie was originally released in the United States on VHS and Laserdisc in August 20, 1996. and on DVD on June 18, 1997, by Artisan Entertainment. It was re-released on DVD and bundled with The Substitute 3: Winner Takes All in 2000. As of 2020, the film was released on Blu-ray Disc in a few European countries, including Germany, in 2015 by NSM Records.

== Reception ==
=== Box office ===
In the United States and Canada, The Substitute grossed $14.8 million at the box office. It opened at No. 2, its first of two consecutive weeks in the Top 10 at the domestic box office.

=== Critical response ===
On the review aggregator website Rotten Tomatoes, 44% of 27 critics' reviews are positive, with an average rating of 4.7/10. Metacritic, which uses a weighted average, assigned the film a score of 41 out of 100, based on 19 critics, indicating "mixed or average" reviews.

Roger Ebert gave the film one star out of four, writing: "I am so very tired of this movie. I see it at least once a month. The title changes, the actors change, and the superficial details of the story change, but it is always about exactly the same thing: heavily armed men shooting at one another. Even the order of their deaths is preordained: First the extras die, then the bit players, then the featured actors, until finally only the hero and the villain are left." James Berardinelli gave the film two stars out of four, writing: "The Substitute has its moments, all of which fall in the realm of high camp. ... Nevertheless, aside from a lot of only moderately-satisfying violence, The Substitute comes across as rather lame. It's not boring, but that dubious qualification isn't enough to earn the movie a passing grade."

In an article about films about troubled teens, The A.V. Club stated: "There have been plenty of movies about white people coming into inner-city schools and whipping the students into shape, but nothing quite like The Substitute, which brings the subtly racist, paternalistic elements of those films right to the surface."

A more positive review came from Kevin Thomas, who wrote: "There's a sense of shrewd observation throughout The Substitute that makes it come alive and seem quite a few cuts above such usual genre fare." Similarly, Mick LaSalle wrote: "The Substitute is a guilty pleasure, but it's not garbage. Berenger brings to the role an appealing ruggedness and world-weariness, and Ernie Hudson, as the corrupt principal, is sleazy and elegant. The script isn't bad, either. The first meeting between Shale and the principal, in which they size each other up, is superb, and, throughout, the outlandish premise is handled with straight-faced intelligence."

== Sequels ==
Three direct-to-DVD sequels were made, with Treat Williams replacing Tom Berenger:

== See also ==
- List of hood films
