= Snowflake (2014 film) =

2014 film by Francesco Roder

- Film poster
- Directed by: Francesco Roder
- Screenplay by: Francesco Roder
- Produced by: Francesco Roder; Anne Leigh Cooper
- Starring: Ele Keats; Tracy Middendorf; Sara Lavner; Dayvin Turchiano; Lorenzo Balducci
- Cinematography: Lyn Moncrief
- Edited by: Angel De Guillermo
- Music by: Luca Lenardi; Federico Piccin
- Production companies: Dreamages Films; Run Away With Me Productions; Suited Four
- Distributed by: IndiePix Films
- Release date: 23 April 2014
- Running time: 15 minutes
- Country: Italy
- Language: English

Snowflake is a 2014 Italian short film written and directed by Italian director Francesco Roder and filmed in New York City. The short film stars American actresses Ele Keats and Tracy Middendorf.

After an advanced screening held during the National Week of Culture in Italy, it officially premiered at the Academy Awards qualifying HollyShorts Film Festival in August 2014 and later won two American Movie Awards in 2015.

== Plot ==
Aurore (Tracy Middendorf) is dying and Claire (Ele Keats) is at her side, waiting for the inevitable end to come. But Aurore has a final gift for her: a diary where she tells the story of their love. While the snowflakes fall outside the window in the darkness of their last night together, Claire will finally see their love story through the eyes of her beloved.

== Cast ==
- Ele Keats as Claire Konrad
- Tracy Middendorf as Aurore Chase
- Sara Lavner as Trish
- Dayvin Turchiano as Jonathan
- Lorenzo Balducci as Patrick

== Production ==
The short film was entirely shot in New York City in January 2013. Actress Ele Keats got involved in the project in 2009 after reading the script and also served as an executive producer while Tracy Middendorf joined the cast two days before filming began. Supporting actors Dayvin Turchiano and Lorenzo Balducci also participated in production in associate and executive roles, respectively.

The post-production process was held in Los Angeles (color timing), Mexico City, Madrid (editing) and Italy (music and sound design).

Being an Italian production shot in the United States, the crew and the cast were equally divided between both nations.

The first screening was held in the director's hometown Sacile, during the National Week of Culture, before the LGBT movie Fasten Your Seatbelts

== Reception ==
The short film premiered in Hollywood at the Academy Award Qualifying HollyShorts Film Festival. It later screened in more than twenty international festivals, including the Cinema Diverse – Palm Springs Gay & Lesbian Film Festival (Palm Springs), the Women's International Film & Arts Festival (Miami), the High Falls Film Festival (Rochester, New York) and the Chéries-Chéris – Festival du Film LGBT de Paris (Paris).

The short film garnered considerable positive reviews from critics. Italian film magazine News Cinema described the film as «delicate and intense, with an extraordinary cast [...] A little jem». The acting performances of the film were equally praised by Italian online magazine Mediacritica, that wrote: «Ele Keats and Tracy Middendorf are superb [...] The mise-en-scene is great and the direction is delicate and never malicious. Snowflake is a winner». According to Rogue Cinema, the director was «able to create a very inspired view of a lesbian relationship without having to resort to obvious clichés or standard story arcs. The performances from both leads, Ele Keats and Tracy Middendorf are also lovingly crafted, each performance allowing the layers of their past to creep into their characters slowly, but surely. Well shot, with a very moody music score, Snowflake achieves great drama throughout».

The jurors of the American Movie Awards praised the «exceptional merits» of the film and the Miami's Women's International Film & Arts Festival program described it as a «meticulously crafted, excellent narrative short film». Talent TV wrote that it was «a beautifully shot and reflective sad story» and jurors at the ShorTS International Film Festival described it as a «sentimental vertigo»

== Festivals ==
After a sneak screening at the San Antonio QFest in San Antonio, Texas, the short film officially debuted on August 19, 2014 at the 10th Annual HollyShorts Film Festival in Los Angeles

- HollyShorts Film Festival, Los Angeles
- San Antonio QFest, San Antonio, Texas
- Filmfest Homochrom, Cologne, Germany
- Cinema Diverse – Palm Springs Gay & Lesbian Film Festival, Palm Springs
- K3 Film Festival FVG, Udine, Italy
- San Pedro International Film Festival, San Pedro, Los Angeles
- High Falls Film Festival, Rochester, New York
- Rumschpringe International Short Film Festival, Lancaster, Pennsylvania
- Chéries-Chéris – Festival du Film LGBT de Paris, Paris
- Grace Film Festival, San Francisco
- Los Angeles CineFest Los Angeles
- Los Angeles Independent Film Festival Awards, Los Angeles
- Women's International Film & Arts Festival, Miami
- Mix Mexico International Film Festival, Mexico City
- Maremetraggio ShorTs International Film Festival, Trieste, Italy
- Macon Film Festival, Macon, Georgia
- La Corte dei Corti, Udine, Italy
- Lancaster International Short Film Festival, Lancaster, Pennsylvania (special screening)
- Outwest Film Festival, Reno, Nevada
- Feminist and Queer International Film Festival, Bucharest, Romania
- Muestra de Cine desde Diversas Trincheras, Mexico City
- Dyke Drama Film Festival, Australia
- Home Festival, Treviso, Italy
- Twisted Love Short Film Festival, Lancaster, Pennsylvania (special screening)
- Cinemambulante, Friuli-Venezia Giulia, Italy (special screening)

== Awards and nominations ==
The short film won a total of 17 international film awards.

- Best Shorts Competition, San Diego Award of Excellence, Best LGBT Short Film
- Accolade Competition San Diego Award of Excellence, Best Leading Actress (Ele Keats)
- Filmfest Homochrom, Cologne, Germany Audience Award, Best Lesbian Short Film
- Cinema Diverse – Palm Springs Gay & Lesbian Film Festival, Palm Springs Festival Favorite, Best LGBT Short Film
- Rumschpringe International Short Film Festival, Lancaster, Pennsylvania Jury Award, Best Drama
- Los Angeles Independent Film Festival Awards, Los Angeles Jury Award, Best Cinematography (Lyn Moncrief)
- Los Angeles Independent Film Festival Awards, Los Angeles Best Drama Nomination, Best Actress Nomination (Ele Keats), Best Supporting Actress (Tracy Middendorf)
- San Francisco Awards, San Francisco, Jury Award, Best LGBTQ Film
- International Independent Film Awards IIFA Los Angeles Diamond Award – Best Actress in a Leading Role (Ele Keats)
- International Independent Film Awards IIFA Los Angeles Diamond Award – Best Actress in a Supporting Role (Tracy Middendorf)
- International Independent Film Awards IIFA Los Angeles Platinum Award – Best Narrative Short
- International Independent Film Awards IIFA Los Angeles Platinum Award – Best Cinematography (Lyn Moncrief)
- IndieFEST Film Awards, La Jolla Award of Excellence – Best Short Film
- IndieFEST Film Awards, La Jolla Award of Excellence – Best Leading Actress (Ele Keats)
- IndieFEST Film Awards, La Jolla Award of Excellence – Best Supporting Actress (Tracy Middendorf)
