= The Personals (1982 film) =

1982 film by Peter Markle

- Film poster
- Directed by: Peter Markle
- Written by: Peter Markle
- Produced by: Patrick Wells
- Starring: Bill Schoppert
- Distributed by: New World Pictures
- Release dates: April 1982 (Houston); October 1982 (regular)
- Country: United States
- Language: English
- Budget: $375,000
- Box office: $2 million

The Personals is a 1982 romantic comedy written and directed by Peter Markle. The film tells the story of a divorced magazine publisher who uses personal advertisements to find romance in Minneapolis. It was shot in Minneapolis and features prominently the city's lakes and urban locations. The film was picked up for distribution by Roger Corman's New World Pictures.

== Production ==
The film was Peter Markle's directorial debut. It was made with a SAG cast recruited from the Guthrie Theater and a nonunion crew. Principal photography took place from May to September 1980, with additional takes and pickups continuing through December and into August 1981. It was shot on 16 mm and blown up to 35 mm for theatrical screenings.

It was filmed in and around Minneapolis, including such landmarks as the Lake of the Isles, Bde Maka Ska, Lake Harriet, and the Minneapolis Institute of Art. The film features prominent scenes of roller-skating around the Minneapolis lakes. As a low budget, independent film, the homes of director Markle, writer Wells, and actor Schoppert were used as filming locations as well.

== Plot ==
Bill Henrikson, a magazine publisher in Minneapolis, places a personal advertisement after his wife Jennifer leaves him for another man. His married friend Paul persuades the reluctant Bill to submit an ad in The Twin Cities Reader describing himself as a "SWM, 32" interested in Picasso and chicken Kiev.

Bill receives multiple responses and begins dating. His first date with Shelly, a single mother, ends early when her candid discussion of divorce and children, combined with spilled wine and direct advances, makes him uncomfortable.

Encouraged by Paul, Bill corresponds with Adrienne, a psychologist. After meeting at a professional party, they begin dating and spend time roller-skating around Minneapolis lakes while sharing details about their families and relationships.

Adrienne reveals she is married to David but claims their marriage is failing. She continues living with David while pursuing her relationship with Bill. Their affair intensifies until David confronts them at the Minneapolis Institute of Art, demanding to know the nature of their relationship. After a physical argument, Adrienne leaves with David, ending the affair.

Bill confides his fears about repeating patterns of heartbreak to Paul, who reassures him that dating is a learning process and encourages him not to lose hope of finding love.

== Cast ==
- Bill Schoppert as Bill Henrikson
- Karen Landry as Adrienne
- Paul Eiding as David
- Victoria Dakil as Shelly
- Chris Forth as Jennifer
- Patrick Thomas O'Brien as Jay

== Reception ==
The film won the Best First Feature Award at the Houston International Film Festival.

New World Pictures distributed the film nationally, and it ran for twelve weeks at St. Louis Park's Cooper Theater. The film received significant local community support during its release. It received generally positive reviews. The Washington Post called it a "minor but admirably polished and attractive low-budget gem," and Variety said that the "story really isn't all the profound, but it's told with sincerity and humor, full of likeable, decent people dealing with familiar problems with wigging out." Variety also commended the cast "making their feature film debut ... so natural it could embarrass some Hollywood acting schools." Multiple reviewers appreciated Minneapolis as a fresh setting for filmmaking. The film ultimately turned a profit.

Its rental tally was $2 million (equivalent to $6.67 million in 2025).

== See also ==
- Personal Column
- Sea of Love
