= A Cry in the Wild =

- DVD cover
- Directed by: Mark Griffiths
- Written by: Gary Paulsen; Catherine Cyran
- Based on: Hatchet by Gary Paulsen
- Produced by: Roger Corman; Julie Corman
- Starring: Jared Rushton; Pamela Sue Martin; Stephen Meadows; Ned Beatty
- Cinematography: Gregg Heschong
- Edited by: Carol Oblath
- Music by: Arthur Kempel
- Production company: Concorde Pictures
- Distributed by: MGM Home Entertainment
- Release date: June 1, 1990
- Running time: 82 minutes
- Country: United States
- Language: English

A Cry in the Wild is a 1990 American coming-of-age survival drama film directed by Mark Griffiths, based on the 1987 novel Hatchet by Gary Paulsen. The film was co-written by Paulsen, and stars Jared Rushton as Brian, Pamela Sue Martin as Brian's mom, Stephen Meadows as Brian's dad, and Ned Beatty as the pilot. It spawned three sequels: White Wolves: A Cry in the Wild II (1993); White Wolves II: Legend of the Wild (1996); and White Wolves III: Cry of the White Wolf (2000).

== Plot ==
Brian Robeson and his mother stop by a sporting goods store on their way to the airport, where she buys him a package. Later, at the airport, Brian opens the package to find a hatchet inside. During his flight on a single-engine plane with the pilot, they exchange a few words.

The pilot allows Brian to fly the plane, which he enjoys. However, the pilot suffers a major heart attack and dies, causing the plane to crash in the wilderness of the Yukon. Now, Brian must survive in the harsh environment while also dealing with his parents' divorce.

== Cast ==
- Jared Rushton as Brian Robeson
- Pamela Sue Martin as Mrs. Robeson, Brian's Mother
- Stephen Meadows as Mr. Robeson, Brian's Father
- Ned Beatty as Jake Holcomb, The Plane's Pilot

== Release ==
The film was released on June 1, 1990. It aired for the first time on television in the United States on PBS as part of the series WonderWorks.

== Reception ==
MovieGuide found it was good family entertainment. A review in the Los Angeles Times also praised the work of the director, full of "gracefulness and a sense of commitment". Conversely, the Orlando Sentinel panned the film, finding it a poor adaptation of the novel and wrote that the story "does not fare as well on film as it does on paper."
