= Christopher Buchholz =

German actor (born 1962)

- Born: 4 February 1962 (age 64); Los Angeles, California, U.S.
- Occupation: Actor
- Years active: 1986 – present

Christopher Buchholz (born 4 February 1962) is an American, French and German actor, who has appeared in more than fifty films since 1986.

He is the son of actors Horst Buchholz and Myriam Bru. Buchholz directed a documentary about his father's life, titled Horst Buchholz … mein Papa (2005).

== Selected filmography ==
Film
Year	Title	Role	Notes
1988	The House on Carroll Street		
1992	Dien Bien Phu		
2003	Luther		
2004	Eros		
2010	Shanghai		
2013	Free Men		

TV
Year	Title	Role	Notes
1994	Wild Justice	Colin Noble	television film
1997	Desert of Fire	Dubai	miniseries
2004	Stauffenberg	Berthold Schenk Graf von Stauffenberg	television film
2005	Les Rois maudits	Edward II of England	miniseries

== Human Rights education ==
(Ge-) Denkwoche Commemoration Week Aus dem Dunkel ein Licht / Out of Darkness a Light – מאפלה לאוֹר Remembering November 9, 1938 –die Reichspogromnacht. Christopher Buchholz reads from his latest novel "Zaza's Odyssey". Theater Hagen. November 3, 2026
