= Parabounce =

The Parabounce is a balloon-like apparatus created by Stephen Meadows and patented on December 4, 2001 (U.S. 6,325,329).

== Description and operation ==
The apparatus consists of a gas-filled balloon envelope made from polyurethane-coated material and of a sufficient diameter and volume so that the balloon, when fully inflated and balanced with appropriate weight, almost counteracts the effects of gravity of a pilot.

The Parabounce incorporates patented features that permit it to be weight balanced and quickly deflated in case of an emergency.

A parachute-style harness secures the pilot to the balloon. By pushing off the ground with his or her legs, the pilot ascends in the balloon to a maximum height of about 120 feet before gradually descending due to the positive weight of the pilot. Optional tether lines held by persons serving as the ground crew prevent the balloon from floating out of control. Once aloft, the pilot can float and glide for distances up to a quarter mile before gradually descending.

== In the news ==
The Parabounce premiered on NBC's Today Show on August 9, 1999. Katie Couric flew the Parabounce a hundred feet above Rockefeller Center.

On February 24, 2002, Five Parabounce units were internally lit and supported acrobats for the closing ceremonies of the Winter Olympics in Salt Lake City, Utah,

On June 29, 2006, Snapple sponsored Parabounce balloon flights at Bryant Park in New York City

Parabounce was featured in Inflatable Magazine on June/July 2003 pg 46-47

== See also ==
Gas Balloon
