= Eros (film) =

2004 film by Wong Kar-wai, Michelangelo Antonioni, Steven Soderbergh

- Theatrical release poster
- Directed by: Wong Kar-wai; Steven Soderbergh; Michelangelo Antonioni
- Written by: Wong Kar-wai; Steven Soderbergh; Tonino Guerra
- Based on: That Bowling Alley on the Tiber by Michelangelo Antonioni (segment "Il filo pericoloso delle cose")
- Produced by: Stéphane Tchalgadjieff; Domenico Procacci; Jimmy de Brabant; Jacky Pang Yee Wah; Jacques Bar; Raphael Berdugo; Wong Kar-wai; Gregory Jacobs
- Starring: Gong Li; Chang Chen; Alan Arkin; Robert Downey Jr.; Ele Keats; Christopher Buchholz; Regina Nemni; Luisa Ranieri
- Cinematography: Christopher Doyle (segment "The Hand"); Peter Andrews (segment "Equilibrium"); Marco Pontecorvo (segment "Il filo pericoloso delle cose")
- Edited by: William Chang Suk Ping (segment "The Hand"); Mary Ann Bernard (segment "Equilibrium"); Claudio Di Mauro (segment "Il filo pericoloso delle cose")
- Music by: Peer Raben (segment "The Hand"); Enrica Antonioni; Vinicio Milani (segment "Il filo pericoloso delle cose")
- Production company: Jet Tone Production
- Distributed by: Warner Independent Pictures (United States and Canada); Fandango (Italy)
- Release dates: 10 September 2004 (Venice); 3 December 2004 (Italy); 8 April 2005 (United States); 12 May 2005 (Hong Kong)
- Running time: 104 minutes
- Countries: Hong Kong; United States; Italy
- Languages: Mandarin; English; Italian
- Box office: $1.5 million

Eros is a 2004 anthology film consisting of three short segments: The Hand directed by Wong Kar-wai in Mandarin, Equilibrium by Steven Soderbergh in English, and The Dangerous Thread of Things by Michelangelo Antonioni in Italian. Each segment addresses the themes of love and sex.

== Plot ==
The Hand

In the 1960s, high-end call girl Miss Hua is visited by shy dressmaker's assistant Zhang, who has come to take her measurements. He hears the sounds of sex as he waits in her living room, and after her client leaves and he is summoned to her room, Miss Hua sees that he is aroused. Hua orders him to take his pants off, telling him she will supply him with an aid to his memory so he will think about her while designing her clothes, and manually pleasures him. Zhang falls in love with Hua, but their different classes are an insurmountable, and he yearns for her from afar through the years as he creates dresses for her, enduring even as Hua falls in stature.

Equilibrium

In 1955, advertising executive Nick Penrose is under enormous pressure at work. He tells his psychiatrist Dr. Pearl about a recurring dream of a beautiful woman he does not know, as they discuss the possible reasons why his stress seems to manifest itself in the erotic dream. However, the doctor is distracted from Nick's account of the dream by someone outside the window of his office, whose attention he is trying to get. After the session, Nick awakes at home and is greeted by his wife, who is also the woman he was dreaming about.

The Dangerous Thread of Things

A bored couple, Christopher and Cloe, take a stroll near a resort on a lake on the coast of Tuscany. Visiting a restaurant on the beach, they see a sexy young woman, Linda. Cloe tells him where Linda lives, inside a crumbling medieval tower. He goes there and finds Linda, and they have sex. After Christopher leaves, the two women later encounter each other on the beach, both naked.

== Cast ==
The Hand

- Gong Li as Miss Hua
- Chang Chen as Xiao Zhang, Jin's apprentice
- Feng Tien as Master Jin
- Luk Auntie as Hua's Servant, Ying
- Jianjun Zhou as Hua's Lover, Zhao

Equilibrium

- Robert Downey Jr. as Nick Penrose
- Alan Arkin as Dr. Pearl / Hal
- Ele Keats as The Woman / Cecelia

The Dangerous Thread of Things

- Christopher Buchholz as Christopher
- Regina Nemni as Cloe
- Luisa Ranieri as The Girl / Linda
- Cecilia Luci as Girl by the Cascade
- Karima Machehour as Girl by the Cascade

== Production ==
=== Development ===
After having produced Antonioni's Beyond the Clouds in 1995, France-based producer Stéphane Tchalgadjieff came up with the idea of doing a trilogy with "eros" as the subject, with one segment directed by the Italian director. The concept was to have two major younger directors, who have been on record to say that they have been influenced by his filmmaking, accompany him. Each would do a segment in total freedom, unaware of the other two. Two French producers, Raphaël Berdugo and Jacques Baralong with Italian producer Domenico Procacci joined him. Amedeo Pagani, producer and Antonioni's friend, was asked to participate but given Antonioni's medical status, he refused to be involved in the movie. "Michelangelo is a good friend but I think it's not a good idea to have him directing an erotic feature in his condition".

After Antonioni's approval, production development on Eros officially began in 2001: after discussing possible directors, the group of producers selected Wong Kar-wai and Pedro Almodóvar to helm the other two short films. During the Italian press tour for Talk to Her in March 2002, Almodóvar declared to be "happy, thrilled and honored to share a film with a master like Antonioni" Wong Kar-wai, for his part, said that the Italian director "had been the guiding light for me and filmmakers of my generation so I'm deeply honored to participate in this project and show him my gratitude".

==== Almodóvar's withdrawal ====
Almodóvar was supposed to start pre-production and location scouting in early April 2002, on a screenplay based on the sexual initiation of an 8-year-old boy. After several delays in finishing the script and being pressed for time as the production of his film Bad Education approached, he was forced to withdraw. During an event to celebrate Antonioni's 90th birthday in September 2002, his wife Enrica announced that Almodóvar had left the project and would be replaced by Steven Soderbergh. It was also announced that the Spanish director was in talks to create the interstitial segment that would link the three parts of the film together. Soderbergh declared that he had accepted the job because he simply wanted his name "on a poster with Michelangelo Antonioni's".

=== Casting ===
Antonioni did not want familiar faces in his segment and also needed actors that were at ease with the nude scenes. Casting commenced in summer 2001. Christopher Buchholz, son of German actor Horst Buchholz, was cast in the role of Christopher, the husband. The actor was originally uncomfortable with the sex scenes, since a particular sequence from the original script required full frontal nudity. The scene was eventually cut and never filmed. Former dancer Regina Nemni got the part of Cloe, the wife and newcomer Luisa Ranieri, popular at the time for a Nestea commercial, was cast as Linda.

Having written a less erotic script, Soderbergh got easy access to A-list actors for the main roles. On February 27, 2003, Variety reported that both Robert Downey Jr. and Alan Arkin had been chosen for the yet-untitled segment. For the dual role of the "Woman in the Dream" (whose scenes required full nudity) and Nick's wife Cecelia, dozens of actresses auditioned for casting director Debra Zane. Ultimately, 29-year-old actress (and former model) Ele Keats booked the part.

In spring 2003, Wong Kar-wai completed the casting for his segment: young Taiwanese actor Chang Chen, who had already worked with the director in Happy Together, landed the lead role of Zhang. Gong Li, who was about to start filming Wong's 2046, joined the cast as Miss Hua.

=== Filming ===
The first episode to be filmed was Antonioni's Il filo pericoloso delle cose. Production began in late October 2001 in Capalbio (Tuscany), on a scheduled 6-week shoot. With a few exceptions (like cinematographer Marco Pontecorvo), the crew was mainly composed by young newcomers. Rome-based architect Stefano Luci debuted as a production designer with Eros thanks to his friendship with Antonioni and helped him finding the right locations for the shooting. Other locations included the Natural Park of Maremma and the Lake Turano. Mainly shot during the day to capture summer's end's natural light with both digital and 35mm cameras, filming officially wrapped in early December. The final budget for the segment was 2,5 billion liras.

Despite being located in 1950s New York City, Soderbergh's Equilibrium was completely shot in a Los Angeles studio. Produced by Soderbergh's long-time collaborator Gregory Jacobs, the segment entered production in late February 2003 and principal photography lasted one week. Production designer Philip Messina and Academy Award-winner costume designer Milena Canonero teamed up to recreate the 1950s look required by the script. Knowing that the other two filmmakers would be more direct in their approach to the subject, Soderbergh chose a lighter, more elliptical path. "I liked the idea that what is supposed to be 'an erotic film' stars Alan Arkin and Robert Downey Jr." Actress Ele Keats, as the only erotic element of the story, spent several hours totally naked on set but, as she later declared, Soderbergh "had meticulously planned everything ahead of time so for me it was like being relaxed at home".

Wong Kar Wai began production on The Hand in early 2003, during the outbreak of SARS in southern China. The original plan of shooting in Shanghai had to be revoked so production had to be moved to Hong Kong. Many crew members quit because of the risks, forcing Wong to work with a reduced staff. Because of the risks, the cast & crew had to wash hands regularly on set and had to work wearing masks, avoiding any possible physical contact with each other. To speed up production, the last two days of shooting were done in a 48-hour period of continuous work. "It was a nightmare but this situation inspired me to make a film about the sense of touch," declared the director during the press conference in Venice.

Luisa Ranieri said her masturbation scene in The Dangerous Thread of Things was traumatic. "It was one of the first scenes, Antonioni made me understand that I had to strip naked and get on the bed and touch myself," she explained. "I had no intention of doing it, but then he convinced me ...On the set I was rubbing my eyes, I'm not doing a hardcore movie I said to myself. It was a shock. After that I got sick and I threw up."

== Reception ==
=== Critical response ===
In North America, critical response for Eros was very mixed. Rotten Tomatoes reported that 34% of critics have given the film a positive review based on 68 reviews, with an average rating of 4.80 out of 10. The site's critics consensus reads, "Though Wong's short lives up to the promise of the title, Antonioni's is a serious disappointment." On Metacritic, the film has a weighted average score of 51 out of 100 based on 22 critic reviews, indicating "mixed or average" reviews. American critics were almost unanimous in their praise of Wong Kar-wai's segment, and almost unanimous in their disapproval of the Michelangelo Antonioni piece. Steven Soderbergh's contribution drew mixed notices.

Roger Ebert gave Wong's segment four out of four stars, Soderbergh's three stars, and Antonioni's a mere one star. On the syndicated television show Ebert & Roeper, he gave the film a "thumbs up" rating. In his Chicago Sun-Times review, he wrote:

Are the three films in Eros intended to be (a) erotic, (b) about eroticism or (c) both? The directors respond in three different ways. Wong Kar-wai chooses (c), Steven Soderbergh chooses (b) and Michelangelo Antonioni, alas, arrives at None of the Above...The Antonioni film is an embarrassment. Regina Nemni acts all of her scenes wearing a perfectly transparent blouse for no other reason, I am afraid, than so we can see her breasts. Luisa Ranieri acts mostly in the nude. The result is soft-core porn of the most banal variety, and when the second woman begins to gambol on the beach one yearns for Russ Meyer to come to the rescue. When you see a woman gamboling in the nude in a Meyer film, you stay gamboled with...I return to Wong Kar-wai's "The Hand." It stays with me. The characters expand in my memory and imagination. I feel empathy for both of them: Miss Hua, sadly accepting the fading of her beauty, the disappearance of her clients, the loss of her health, and Mr. Zhang, who will always be in her thrall. "I became a tailor because of you," he says. It is the greatest compliment it is within his power to give, and she knows it. Knows it, and is touched by it as none of the countless words of her countless clients have ever, could ever, touch her.

=== Box office ===
Eros was distributed for theatrical release in North America by Warner Independent Pictures on April 8, 2005. Promotion was poor; for example, on At the Movies with Ebert and Roeper, critic Richard Roeper remarked that he was surprised that Warner Independent did not send any clips to be broadcast on the show and that this was the only movie reviewed on the show he remembered for which the studio had taken such a step (incidentally, the critics gave the film a "Two Thumbs Up" rating). Opening on twelve screens, box office was weak, earning just US$53,666 ($4,472 per screen) in its opening weekend on its way to a low US$188,392 final gross.

Boxofficemojo.com reports that the total worldwide gross for Eros is $1,535,829.
