= Ele Keats =

American actress, model, and jewelry designer

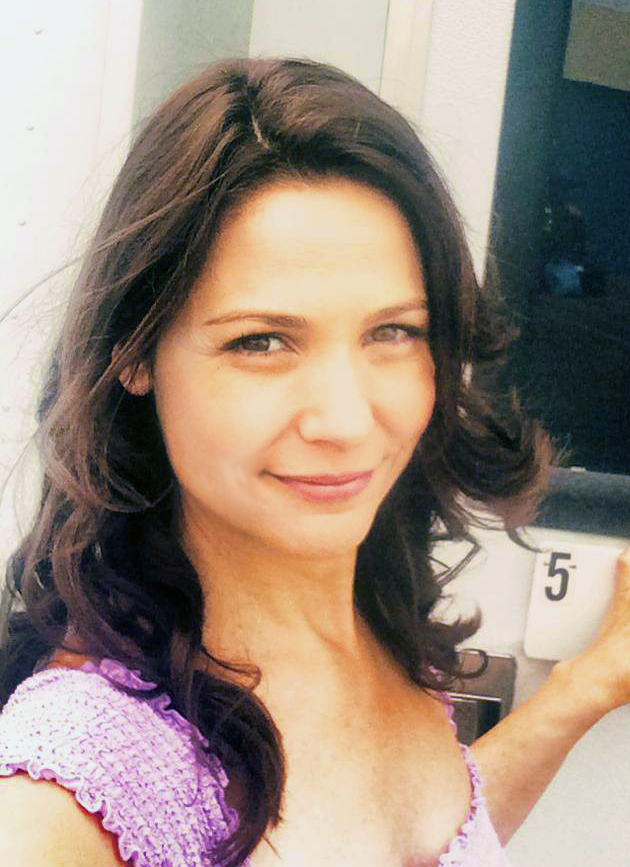
- Ele Keats on the set of Insidious: Chapter 3
- Occupations: Actress; model; jewelry designer
- Years active: 1986–present
- Known for: Tribes; Newsies; Ouija: Origin of Evil; Frankie and Johnny; Insidious: Chapter 3

Ele Keats is an American television, film and stage actress, model, and jewelry designer. Keats's most notable roles were in the Disney musical drama film Newsies, Garry Marshall's Frankie and Johnny, the biographical survival drama Alive, Steven Soderbergh's Eros and the horror film Insidious: Chapter 3. She has also appeared in more than one hundred national TV commercials.

== Acting career ==
Keats began her professional career as a young model, being featured in publications such as American Baby, Ladies' Home Journal & Teen Magazine.

After moving to Los Angeles she launched her acting career at fifteen, being featured in a Michael Jackson Pepsi commercial and in 1988 she appeared in LL Cool J's Going Back to Cali music video, directed by Ric Menello.

Keats has appeared in more than one hundred TV commercials, including the 1990 Levi's jeans beach ad.

She trained theatrically in New York and in Los Angeles under Gene Bua and Fran Rosen, among others, and starred in plays such as Seven Sided Circle, at the Gene Bua Theatre and Music, America. Small television roles quickly followed, including the pilot for The Outsiders, produced by Francis Ford Coppola and a recurring part in the CBS sitcom Dear John starring Judd Hirsch.

When she was still in her teens, Keats landed a regular role in Fox's daily soap opera Tribes as Anny, a pregnant teen girl. The same year she made her feature film debut with a featured role in The Rocketeer.

A rapid succession of bigger roles followed in films such as There Goes My Baby (filmed in 1990 but released in 1994 due to Orion Pictures' bankruptcy), Garry Marshall's Frankie and Johnny (opposite Al Pacino and Michelle Pfeiffer), the Disney musical Newsies as Sarah Jacobs, love interest of Christian Bale's Jack Kelly, and Frank Marshall's acclaimed drama Alive.

During the 1990s, Keats landed leading and supporting roles in television and independent projects such as Lipstick Camera, the thriller-drama I Shot a Man in Vegas, Disney Channel's White Wolves II: Legend of the Wild, Frank LaLoggia's thriller The Haunted Heart (later re-named Mother, starring Diane Ladd and Olympia Dukakis) and the CBS prime-time drama Race Against Time: the Search of Sarah (in the title role). She also landed a regular role in the Fox sci-fi series White Dwarf, again produced by Francis Ford Coppola, but the pilot wasn't picked up to series and it aired as a TV movie in May 1995. In addition, she appeared in numerous popular TV series, including Diagnosis: Murder, Class of '96, Touched by an Angel and MTV's Undressed.

In 2001, she played Michelle Phillips' daughter in the independent film March and subsequently landed the role of the mysterious woman in Steven Soderbergh's Eros (opposite Robert Downey Jr.), which debuted at the Venice Film Festival in 2004. Other roles include the leads in Heidi Van Leer's indie comedies Monday and American Decaf. On television, she guest-starred in renowned series such as CSI: Crime Scene Investigation, CSI: NY, Cold Case and Greek and continued to appear in numerous national TV commercials for brands such as Nissan, AT&T, Petco, Firestone and Kellogg's. She also starred in the stage production The Vagina Monologues in Los Angeles.

In 2014 she starred in Snowflake, a critically acclaimed short film shot in New York City opposite Tracy Middendorf. She later booked roles in the Blumhouse horror films Insidious: Chapter 3 (as Lillith Brenner) and Ouija: Origin of Evil.

In 2017, she played Adam Baldwin's wife Christine in The Last Ship and in 2018 had a role in the mid-season finale of CBS's NCIS.

== Jewelry design career ==
Apart from her job as an actress, Keats has launched her own jewelry line in 2005, Ele Keats Jewelry. As a jewelry designer, Keats specializes in inspirational and birthstone designs and works only with ethical stones. Her creations have been featured in several magazines, worn in many movies and TV shows and received an overwhelming response from celebrity clientele, who praise her inspirational designs as “simply stunning.”

Keats counts Diane Keaton, Elizabeth Berkley, Poppy Montgomery, Carla Gugino, Jessica Biel, Laura Dern, Stefanie Scott, Cameron Diaz, and Mandy Moore among her clients.

The Ele Keats Jewelry official shop was opened in 2013 in Brentwood, Los Angeles. Renamed Ele Keats Jewelry Lifestyle Experience, the shop relocated in a new, wider space in Santa Monica, California in 2016.

== Personal life ==
Keats is a vegan and has been practicing yoga and meditation for more than 20 years.

== Filmography ==
=== Film ===
Key
†	Denotes films that have not yet been released.

Year	Title	Role	Notes
1991	Missing Parents	Melanie	Short Film; Premiered at the Sundance Film Festival (Discovery Program)
1991	The Rocketeer	Girl at Newsstand	
1991	Liebestraum	Actress on Soap Opera	(footage from "Tribes")
1991	Frankie and Johnny	Artemis	
1992	Murder Without Motive: The Edmund Perry Story	Lisa	Television film
1992	Newsies	Sarah Jacobs	Outstanding Young Ensemble Cast in a Motion Picture Nomination - Young Artists Awards
1993	Alive	Susana Parrado	
1994	Lipstick Camera	Omy Clark	Video
1994	There Goes My Baby	Emily	
1995	Mother	Audrey	Video
1995	White Dwarf	Princess Ariel	Television Film
1995	I Shot a Man in Vegas	Hippie Chick	
1996	Cityscrapes: Los Angeles	Chloe	
1996	White Wolves II: Legend of the Wild	Beri	Video
1996	Race Against Time: The Search for Sarah	Sarah Porter	Television Film
1998	Hairshirt	Slapping Girl	
2000	Code Blue	Samantha Smith (voice)	Video Game
2001	March	Jessica	
2004	Eros	The Woman (segment "Equilibrium")	Premiered at the Venice Film Festival
2005	The Good Humor Man	Bride	
2006	Monday	The Girlfriend	Premiered at the Slamdance Film Festival
2011	American Decaf	Elie	Also Associate Producer
2014	Snowflake	Claire	Short Film; Premiered at the Hollyshorts Film Festival; Also Executive Producer
2015	Insidious: Chapter 3	Lillith Brenner	
2016	Ouija: Origin of Evil	Ellie's mom	
TBA	BFFs †	Detective Francis	

=== Television ===
Key
†	Denotes shows that have not yet been released.

Year	Title	Role	Notes
1990	Dear John	Sandy	3 episodes
1990	The Outsiders	Car Hop	Episode: "Pilot"
1990	Normal Life	Stacey	Episode: "Prom?"
1990	Room for Romance		Episode: "Fool's Gold"
1990	Tribes	Anny Kubiak	65 episodes
1993	Class of '96	Karen Anderson	Episode: "Educating David"
1998	Diagnosis: Murder	Amy Sanderson	Episode: "Rain of Terror"
1998	Touched by an Angel	Tracy Beringer	Episode: "Perfect Little Angel"
1999	MTV's Undressed	Katie	Episode: "Pilot" (unaired)
2001	CSI: Crime Scene Investigation	Joyce Lanier	Episode: "To Halve and to Hold"
2005	Night Stalker	Emily Gale	Episode: "Pilot"
2006	Ileanarama - Supermarket of the Stars		Episode: "Pilot"
2006	Cold Case	Helen Bradley	Episode: "The Key"
2009	CSI: NY	Mary McQuade	Episode: "Second Chances"
2010	Greek	Margie Hilgendorf	Episode: "Your Friends and Neighbors"
2010	The Legion of Extraordinary Dancers	Diane James	Episode: "Origins"
2015	OverParenting	Penny	Episode: "A Lemonade Stand"
2017	The Last Ship	Christine Slattery	Episode: "Nostos"
2018	NCIS	Judy Shaw	Episode: "What Child is This?"
2020	The Bet - The Web Series	Ele Keats	Episode 6
2025	The Trouble with Billy †	Lisa Damage	Recurring
