= I, Don Giovanni =

- Directed by: Carlos Saura
- Starring: Tobias Moretti; Lorenzo Balducci
- Release date: 23 October 2009
- Running time: 127 minutes
- Countries: Spain; Italy; Austria
- Languages: German; Italian

I, Don Giovanni (Italian: Io, Don Giovanni) is a 2009 Spanish-Italian-Austrian drama film directed by Carlos Saura. The film narrates the life of Lorenzo da Ponte, best known as a librettist, and attempts to link him to the character Don Giovanni, the anti-hero of one of his librettos.

Da Ponte was an Italian Freemason who wouldn't give up his libertinism, despite being ordered to do so as a priest of the Roman Catholic Church. The Holy Inquisition accused da Ponte of having betrayed the Christian faith through his licentiousness and publication of criticisms against the church (influenced by Casanova), and he was exiled from Venice.

He arrived in Vienna with a presentation letter for Antonio Salieri. He lived in the city for two years before meeting Mozart (although the film implies a shorter time-line), and wrote the libretto for the opera The Marriage of Figaro (based on the play by Beaumarchais). The play represented a challenge to the ancien régime and was highly controversial, but da Ponte toned down the political content and the first production of the opera was relatively successful, although it did not have a long run. The success of a subsequent Marriage of Figaro production in Prague led to da Ponte being commissioned to write the libretto for Mozart's next opera Don Giovanni, which in 1787 had a successful premiere in Prague.

== Cast ==
- Lorenzo Balducci as Lorenzo Da Ponte
- Tobias Moretti as Giacomo Casanova
- Lino Guanciale as Wolfgang Amadeus Mozart
- Ennio Fantastichini as Antonio Salieri
- Francesco Barilli as Vescovo
