= Wagons East =

1994 film by Peter Markle

- Theatrical release poster
- Directed by: Peter Markle
- Written by: Matthew Carlson
- Produced by: Gary Goodman; Robert Newmyer; Barry Rosen; Jeffrey Silver
- Starring: John Candy; Richard Lewis; John C. McGinley; Ellen Greene; Robert Picardo; Rodney A. Grant; Ed Lauter
- Cinematography: Frank Tidy
- Edited by: Scott Conrad
- Music by: Michael Small
- Production companies: Carolco Pictures; Outlaw Productions; Goodman-Rosen Production
- Distributed by: TriStar Pictures
- Release date: August 26, 1994
- Running time: 107 minutes
- Country: United States
- Language: English
- Budget: $23 million
- Box office: $4.4 million

Wagons East (sometimes styled as Wagons East!) is a 1994 American Western adventure comedy film directed by Peter Markle, written by Matthew Carlson, and starring John Candy, Richard Lewis, John C. McGinley, Ellen Greene, Robert Picardo, Rodney A. Grant, and Ed Lauter. It tells the story of an alcoholic wagon master who leads a group of misfit settlers in the Wild West back to the East. The film was released in the United States on August 26, 1994. Filming took place in Sierra de Órganos National Park in the town of Sombrerete, Mexico, and in Durango, Mexico.

During the final days of the film's production in Durango, Mexico, John Candy unexpectedly died of a suspected myocardial infarction at the age of 43. Script re-writes, a stand-in and special effects were used to complete his remaining scenes, and it was released five months after his death. The film marked Candy's penultimate performance, with the film being dedicated in memory of him as well as the film being the last Carolco Pictures production to be distributed by TriStar Pictures.

The film was panned by critics, with a rare 0% rating on Rotten Tomatoes. The film was also a box office failure, as it grossed just $4.4 million against a $23 million budget.

== Plot ==
In the 1860s Wild West, a group of misfit settlers, including ex-doctor Phil Taylor, prostitute Belle, and gay bookseller Julian Rogers, decide they cannot live in their current situation in the west, so they hire a grizzled alcoholic wagon master by the name of James Harlow to take them on a journey back to their hometowns in the East.

Comedic exploits ensue as the drunken wagon master lets his horse choose the correct fork in the road, leads them to a dried-out watering hole, and eventually guides them into Sioux territory where they are captured. The Chief, however, is sympathetic to the idea of 'white men heading back east', and offers an escort off Sioux land. Meanwhile, they must also contend with (inept) hired gunslingers who have been sent by railroad magnates to stop the journey, as they fear the bad publicity it could create for the settlers about to commence a 'land rush' into the west.

Harlow's secret, that he had been wagon master for the infamous Donner Party, eventually comes out, and the group confront Harlow about his past; he chooses to walk away from the group, and they proceed on their own. The cavalry leader back at camp ends up confessing that he knew Harlow, and had taken supplies from the Donner party in order to support his troops attacking Mexico. Harlow resumes his drinking at the closest tavern, he overhears that the cavalry will be confronting the group the following day, and intends to wipe them out, as directed by the head of the railroad company. As the cavalry arrives the next day and the group "square their wagons", Harlow rides to the rescue and 'calls out' the cavalry leader to single combat.

After a drawn out and comical fight scene, Harlow is victorious, and the group celebrates. Harlow and Belle decide to pursue a relationship, Julian departs for somewhere "even further west" (San Francisco), and the group rides toward the now visible St. Louis to finish the journey.

== Cast ==
- John Candy as James Harlow
- Richard Lewis as Phil Taylor
- John C. McGinley as Julian Rogers
- Ellen Greene as Belle
- Robert Picardo as Ben Wheeler
- Rodney A. Grant as Little Feather/Big Snake
- Ed Lauter as John Slade
- William Sanderson as Zeke
- Joel McKinnon Miller as Zack Ferguson
- Tony Pierce as Junior Ferguson
- Marvin J. McIntyre as Irving Ferguson
- Abraham Benrubi as Abe Ferguson
- David Dunard as Harry Bob Ferguson
- Thomas F. Duffy as Clayton Ferguson
- Russell Means as Chief
- Lochlyn Munro as Billy
- Melinda Culea as Constance Taylor
- Don Lake as Lt. Bailey
- Ethan Phillips as Commander S.L. Smedly
- Charles Rocket as Gen. Larchmont
- Gailard Sartain as J.P. Moreland (Uncredited)

== Production ==
John Candy was contractually mandated to make this film due to his existing contract with Carolco Pictures from their scrapped John Hughes comedy film Bartholomew v. Neff, which Candy was to star in with Sylvester Stallone as feuding neighbors. Despite his grievances with the script and due to the fact that he was over $1 million in debt due to his stake as a minority owner with the struggling Toronto Argonauts football team, the financially strained Candy reluctantly agreed to make Wagons East in Durango, Mexico.

However on the evening of March 3, 1994, after finishing the day’s shooting, an exhausted Candy went back to his hotel room to sleep. Candy who struggled with obesity and overall poor health from years of heavy drinking, use of cocaine and smoking for most of his adult life, died of a suspected myocardial infarction in his sleep the following day March 4. That same morning Candy was scheduled for another day of filming, but was found dead by costars Richard Lewis and Robert Picardo. According to People, Lewis and Picardo both broke down crying outside Candy's trailer. Following Candy's unexpected tragic death, Carolco received an insurance payout of $15.3 million (approximately $34.6 million in 2026 adjusted for inflation). The film was completed by using CGI, an uncredited body double, and script rewrites to finish Candy's remaining scenes.

== Reception ==
Wagons East was released five months after Candy's death and was a box-office bomb that grossed only $4.4 million against a $23 million budget. On the review aggregator website Rotten Tomatoes, 0% of 27 critics' reviews are positive, with an average rating of 2.8/10. The website's consensus reads: "Wagons East! is a witless, toothless satire of Westerns that falls far below the standard set by Blazing Saddles, and is notable only for being John Candy's final screen performance." Audiences polled by CinemaScore gave the film an average grade of "C−" on an A+ to F scale.

Film critic Roger Ebert, who called the film "a sad way to end John Candy's career", stated that his legacy was already permanent and would survive this film.

In the book The Comedy Film Nerds Guide to Movies, Wagons East! is listed at number one on its list of The Ten Worst Westerns.

== Year-end lists ==
- 6th worst– Robert Denerstein, Rocky Mountain News
- Top 18 worst (alphabetically listed, not ranked) – Michael Mills, The Palm Beach Post
- Worst (not ranked) – Bob Ross, The Tampa Tribune
- #3 Worst - Michael Medved, Sneak Previews

== See also ==
- List of films with a 0% rating on Rotten Tomatoes
- Almost Heroes
