= White Wolves III: Cry of the White Wolf =

2000 American film

White Wolves III: Cry of the White Wolf is a 2000 American coming-of-age survival drama film and the last sequel to A Cry in the Wild.

== Plot ==
Two teenagers are stranded in the wilds of Northern Canada after a plane crash and they must call upon an ancient Native American spirit of a legendary white wolf to help them survive.

== Cast ==
- Mick Cain as Jack
- Mercedes McNab as Pamela
- Rodney A. Grant as Quentin
- Margaret Howell as Irene
- Robin Clarke as Mr. Patterson
- Tracey Brooks Swope as Mrs. Patterson
- Frederick Dawson as Frank
- David Campbell as Nick
