= Peter Markle =

American film director, television director and screenwriter

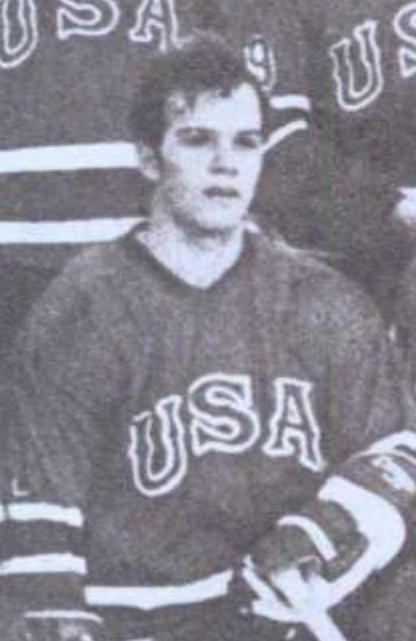
- Born: September 24, 1952 (age 74); Danville, Pennsylvania, U.S.
- Occupations: Film director, television director, screenwriter
- Years active: 1982–present
- Spouse: Melinda Culea (m. 1996)

Peter Markle (born September 24, 1952) is an American film director, television director and screenwriter. He has directed episodes of Everwood, CSI: Crime Scene Investigation, The X-Files, as well as many other programs. He was director of the 2006 television film Flight 93, and he also directed the 1982 romantic comedy film The Personals and the 1994 comedy western film Wagons East.

== Filmography ==
- The Personals (1982)
- Hot Dog…The Movie (1984)
- Youngblood (1986)
- Bat*21 (1988)
- Breaking Point (1989)
- Nightbreaker (1989)
- El Diablo (1990)
- Through the Eyes of a Killer (1992)
- Wagons East (1994)
- White Dwarf (1995)
- The Last Days of Frankie the Fly (1996)
- Virginia's Run (2002)
- Saving Jessica Lynch (2003) (TV)
- Faith of My Fathers (2005)
- Flight 93 (2006) (TV)
- The Tenth Circle (2008) (TV)
- High Noon (2009) (TV)
- Odds Are... (2018)
