= 48 ore =

Italian television series

- Genre: Police procedural
- Created by: Eros Puglielli
- Starring: Claudio Amendola; Claudia Gerini; Adriano Giannini; Massimo Poggio; Marco Bonini; Lorenzo Balducci; Valentina Lodovini; Luigi Maria Burruano
- Country of origin: Italy
- No. of seasons: 1
- No. of episodes: 12

Original release
- Network: Canale 5, Italia 1
- Release: May 2 – August 14, 2006

48 ore (English: 48 Hours) is an Italian police procedural television series aired on Mediaset in 2006. It premiered on May 2, 2006, on Canale 5.

== Premise ==
The series takes place in Genoa and tells the story of the Flying Squad, a group of police officers whose job it is to capture fugitives.

== Cast ==
- Claudia Gerini as Marta De Maria
- Valentina Lodovini as Benny Miulli
- Adriano Giannini as Renato Tenco
- Marco Bonini as Judge Sogliano
- Claudio Amendola as Diego Montagna
- Lorenzo Balducci as Andrea Bille
- Massimo Poggio as Fabrizio Strada
- Luigi Maria Burruano as Mario Crotone
- Maria Remi as Francesca Ventura
