= Tracy Middendorf =

American actress

- Education: State University of New York, Purchase (BFA)
- Occupation: Actress
- Years active: 1992–present
- Spouse: Franz Wisner (m. 2005)
- Children: 2

Tracy Middendorf is an American television, movie, and stage actress. Middendorf's most notable roles were in the horror film Wes Craven's New Nightmare, the MTV series Scream, and the HBO series Boardwalk Empire. She also appeared in the Broadway production of Ah, Wilderness!. She has won two Ovation Awards, one Drama-Logue Award, and one Los Angeles Drama Critics Circle Award for her stage work, and also received an American Movie Award in 2015.

== Biography ==
=== Acting career ===
Middendorf attended the Conservatory of Theatrical Arts at SUNY Purchase before breaking into television as Carrie Brady on the daytime soap opera Days of Our Lives in 1992. The following year, she made her feature-film debut in Wes Craven's New Nightmare, wherein she played the supporting role of Julie.

During the 1990s, Middendorf built her career as a supporting actress in several television movies and episodes of series, including Beverly Hills, 90210 (the recurring role of Laura Kingman during the show's fourth season), Murder, She Wrote, Star Trek: Deep Space Nine, The X-Files, Angel, Ally McBeal, Chicago Hope, and Millennium. She also starred in the television movie Dying to Belong, and had a small part in For Love of the Game.

In March 1995, she resumed her stage career in Los Angeles playing Nicole Warren Diver in F. Scott Fitzgerald's Tender is the Night directed by Simon Levy at the Fountain Theatre. The same year she played Jill in Pilgrims by Stephen Metcalfe at the Old Globe Theatre in San Diego. The following year, she got an Ovation Awards nomination for her performance in Tennessee Williams's Orpheus Descending. In 1998, she briefly relocated to the East Coast to star in two different plays: Ah, Wilderness! at the Lincoln Center's Vivian Beaumont Theater (that marked her Broadway debut) and the Big Knife in Massachusetts. She returned to the Los Angeles stage with Tennessee Williams's Summer and Smoke, winning the Ovation Award for the best leading female performance.

During the 2000s, Middendorf had guest-starring stints in Six Feet Under, CSI: Crime Scene Investigation, and Cold Case, among other shows, and had recurring roles in 24, The Division, Alias, and Lost.

On the big screen, she had parts in Mission: Impossible III, The Assassination of Richard Nixon, El Cortez, and Just Add Water. In 2002, she won another Ovation Award for her performance in Stephen Sachs' After the Fall, which ran for 7 sold-out months at the Fountain Theatre. For that production, she also won the Los Angeles Drama Critics Circle Award.

In 2010, Middendorf was cast as Babette in Boardwalk Empire, first appearing in the series pilot and featured in other eight episodes through the first and the second seasons. After starring in Reaching for the Moon, she won a recurring role in the action-drama hit show The Last Ship as Darien Chandler.

Middendorf continued her stage work, including the title role in Miss Julie, a Yale Repertory Theatre production of Battle of Black and Dogs, a Shakespeare Theatre Company production of Old Times, and debuted as a director in Louise Rozett's Break during the New York International Fringe Festival in August 2011.

In April 2015, she won an American Movie Award as Best Actress for her performance in Snowflake, a critically acclaimed short film she filmed in New York City opposite Ele Keats After starring in the Beth Henley's play Abundance at the Actors Company Theatre in New York City, Middendorf joined the cast of the MTV series Scream as Maggie Duval.

=== Personal life ===
Middendorf is married to writer Franz Wisner (Honeymoon with My Brother), and they have two sons. She has a son from a previous relationship with actor Cameron Dye.

== Filmography ==
=== Film ===
Year	Title	Role	Notes
1994	Wes Craven's New Nightmare	Julie	Premiered at the Toronto Film Festival
1995	Milestone	Sarah	Short Film
1999	For Love of the Game	Blonde Player's Wife	
2004	The Assassination of Richard Nixon	Businesswoman	Premiered at the Cannes Film Festival
2006	Mission: Impossible III	Ashley	
2006	El Cortez	Theda	
2008	Just Add Water	Nora	
2010	Boy Wonder	Mary Donovan	
2013	Reaching for the Moon	Mary	Premiered at the Berlin International Film Festival
2014	Snowflake	Aurore	Short Film; Best Actress Award - American Movie Awards

=== Television ===
Year	Title	Role	Notes
1992	One Stormy Night	Caroline Anna 'Carrie' Brady	TV movie
1992	Days of Our Lives	Caroline Anna 'Carrie' Brady	Series Regular
1993–1994	Beverly Hills, 90210	Laura Kingman	6 episodes
1995	Ed McBain's 87th Precinct: Lightning	Dorothy	TV movie
1995	McKenna	Skates	Episode: "Racing in the Streets"
1995	The Client	Denise	Episode: "Happily Ever After"
1996	Murder, She Wrote	Erin Garman	Episode: "The Dark Side of the Door"
1996	Star Trek: Deep Space Nine	Tora Ziyal	Episode: "For the Cause"
1997	Dying to Belong	Kim Lessing	TV movie
1997	Touched by an Angel	Amethyst	Episode: "Last Call"
1997	Perversions of Science	Cheerleader	Episode: "Panic"
1997	The Practice	Jennifer Cole	Episode: "Betrayal"
1998	L.A. Doctors	Alice Springs	Episode: "Under the Radar"
1999	Chicago Hope	Jesse Porter	Episode: "Teacher's Pet"
1999	Millennium	Cass Doyle	Episode: "Darwin's Eye"
1999	Angel	Tina	Episode: "City of"
1999	Ally McBeal	Risa Helms	Episode: "Car Wash" and "Heat Wave"
2000	The Practice	Jennifer Cole	Episode: "Officers of the Court"
2000	The X-Files	Gracie O'Connor	Episode: "Signs and Wonders"
2001	Family Law	Amanda Grant	Episode: "Americans"
2001	Gideon's Crossing	Becky Lasker	Episode: "The Way"
2001	Six Feet Under	Adele Swanson	Episode: "The Will"
2002	The Practice	Jennifer Cole	Episode: "The Return of Joey Heric"
2002	The Time Tunnel	Sheila Phillips	TV movie
2002	JAG	Mariel Reese	Episode: "Code of Conduct"
2002	Any Day Now	Tanya Meyer	Episode: "Call Him Macaroni"
2002	Night Visions	Lucinda	Episode: "Harmony"
2002	The Division	Kimberly	Episodes: "Before the Deluge" and "Sweet Sorrow"
2002	24	Carla Matheson	4 episodes
2003	Alias	Elsa Caplan	Episodes: "A Free Agent" and "Endgame"
2003	The Guardian	Laura Donnellon	Episode: "Hazel Park"
2003	CSI: Crime Scene Investigation	Bridget Willis	Episode: "Lucky Strike"
2004	Cold Case	Rebecca Morgan / Linda Frandsen	Episode: "Maternal Instincts"
2004	Medical Investigation	Anne Harring	Episode: "Escape"
2004	The Perfect Husband: The Laci Peterson Story	Amber Frey	TV movie
2005	House	Sarah Reilich	Episode: "Cursed"
2006	Without a Trace	Audrey West	Episode: "The Thing with Feathers"
2007	Shark	Wendy Phillips	Episode: "Wayne's World 2: Revenge of the Shark"
2007	Lost	Bonnie	Episodes: "Greatest Hits", "Through the Looking Glass" Part I and "Through the Looking Glass" Part II
2007	Law & Order: Special Victims Unit	Sarah Flint	Episode: "Snitch"
2009	CSI: Crime Scene Investigation	Belinda Mayfield	Episode: "Working Stiffs"
2009	Bones	Gaynor Rabin	Episode: "The Tough Man in the Tender Chicken"
2010	The Mentalist	Jane Doe	Episode: "Aingavite Baa"
2010–2012	Boardwalk Empire	Babette	Recurring role, 9 episodes
2011	Criminal Minds	Lyla Bradstone	Episode: "Proof"
2014	The Last Ship	Darien Chandler	Recurring role
2015–2016	Scream	Margaret "Maggie" Duval	Series Regular, 24 episodes Favorite Ensemble Nomination - TV Guide Awards
2017	Bloodline	Sally's mom	Episode: "Part 30"
2018	Gone	Helen Ross	Episodes: "Demons", "Rise"

=== Theatre ===
Year	Title	Role	Venue/Director	Notes
1995	Tender is the Night	Nicole Warren Diver	The Fountain Theatre / Simon Levy	
1995	Reckless			
1995	Getting Out			
1995	Pilgrims	Jill O'Brien	Old Globe Theatre, San Diego / Stephen Metcalfe	
1996	Orpheus Descending	Carol Cutrere	The Fountain Theatre / Simon Levy	Ovation Awards Nomination - Best Featured Actress in a Play
1997	Mobile Hymn	Park Ranger	Santa Monica Playhouse / Robert Litz	Drama-Logue Award Winner - Best Ensemble
1998	Ah, Wilderness!	Muriel McComber	Lincoln Center / Daniel Sullivan	Broadway Debut
1998	The Big Knife!	Dixie Evans	Williamstown Theatre Festival / Joanne Woodward	
1999	Summer and Smoke	Miss Alma	The Fountain Theatre / Simon Levy	Ovation Award Winner - Best Actress in a Leading Role
2002	After the Fall	Maggie	The Fountain Theatre / Stephen Sachs	Ovation Award Winner - Best Actress in a Leading Role; LADCC Award Winner - Best Actress in a Leading Role
2007	Miss Julie	Miss Julie	The Fountain Theatre / Stephen Sachs	
2008	The Pavilion	Kari	Westport Country Playhouse / Chad Rabinovitz	
2010	Battle of Black and Dogs	Léone	Yale Repertory Theatre, New York City / Robert Woodruff	
2011	Old Times	Kate	Lansburgh Theatre, Washington D.C. / Michael Kahn	
2011	Break		New York International Fringe Festival / Tracy Middendorf	Directorial debut
2015	Abundance	Bess johnson	The Actors Company Theatre, New York City / Jenn Thompson	
2018	Danny and the Deep Blue Sea		Mastrogeorge Theatre, Austin, Texas / Tracy Middendorf	Only Director
