= Hawkeye (1994 TV series) =

1994–1995 television series

- Genre: Adventure; Western
- Created by: Kim LeMasters
- Starring: Lee Horsley; Lynda Carter; Rodney A. Grant
- Music by: Joel Goldsmith
- Country of origin: Canada
- Original language: English
- No. of seasons: 1
- No. of episodes: 22

Production
- Executive producer: Stephen J. Cannell
- Running time: 60 minutes
- Production company: Cannell Entertainment

Original release
- Network: Syndication
- Release: September 17, 1994 – May 13, 1995

Hawkeye (also referred to as Hawkeye: The First Frontier) is a Canadian adventure-Western television series created by Kim LeMasters. The series aired in syndication for one season from 1994 to 1995, and was produced by Stephen J. Cannell. It was filmed in North Vancouver and Vancouver, British Columbia, Canada.

Based on characters from the Leatherstocking Tales, a set of novels written by James Fenimore Cooper, the series takes place in 1755 Hudson Valley, New York during the French and Indian War. It follows the main character, Natty Bumppo (Lee Horsley), his Native American companion Chingachgook (Rodney A. Grant), English trading post owner Elizabeth Shields (Lynda Carter) and other people stationed at or living in the vicinity of Fort Bennington.

== Cast ==
- Lee Horsley as Hawkeye (Natty Bumppo)
- Lynda Carter as Elizabeth Shields
- Duncan Fraser as Colonel Munro
- Dave "Squatch" Ward as Sam
- Rodney A. Grant as Chingachgook
- Garwin Sanford as Captain Taylor Shields
- Lochlyn Munro as McKinney
- Jed Rees as Peevey

== Episodes ==
In the 18th century during the war between French and British troops, frontier woodsman Hawkeye helps Elizabeth Shields, an Englishwoman, to deliver her husband from the French. The action takes place in the Hudson Valley.

No.	Title	Directed by	Written by	Original release date
1	"Pilot: Part 1"	Brad Turner	Kim LeMasters	September 17, 1994
British Captain Taylor Shields' brother William and wife Elizabeth have traveled to Fort Bennington to make a new life, but when Taylor fails to secure trading contracts, William holds the family inheritance over his head, pushing Taylor to take him out and only Hawkeye witnesses the truth.
2	"Pilot: Part 2"	James A. Contner	Kim LeMasters	September 24, 1994
Captain Taylor enlisted two ne'er-do-wells to help him get rid of his brother. Meanwhile, Elizabeth is rescued by Hawkeye as she attempts to find her husband who was captured by the Hurons and later taken to the French fort. They blow up the fort, but the French have taken her husband elsewhere.
3	"The Bear"	Richard Compton	Shelly Moore	October 1, 1994
Elizabeth is picking berries in the woods when she frees a trapped wildcat. Frightened by a bear, she flees and runs into Hawkeye. She has nightmares about it, realizing she should take Hawkeye's advice and learn how to take care of herself. The first step: learn to shoot. She trades services with Hawkeye; he teaches her to shoot and she teaches him how to read.
4	"The Furlough"	Christopher Leitch	Steve Feke	October 8, 1994
Young widow Sarah is rescued from a lecherous French trapper by Hawkeye, but the trapper is killed. His Huron Mingo squaw wants revenge and has Hawkeye captured for torture and death. Hawkeye asks for a 24-hour furlough to set his life in order with Sarah and with Chingachgook, his Delaware friend. The Huron chief grants him his furlough but things turn out differently than originally planned. Note: The character Elizabeth Shields, while mentioned, does not appear in this episode.
5	"The Siege"	Brad Turner	Steve Feke & David Levinson	October 15, 1994
The French are laying siege to the fort. Rumor comes that the French have a 30-pound cannon the length of 3 men. While preparations are made for surrender, Hawkeye, Elizabeth and Chingachgook conceive a daring plan to capture and destroy the cannon.
6	"The Child"	Richard Compton	Jon Boorstin	October 22, 1994
A couple from Virginia with a child seek safety in the fort, only they aren't the baby's parents, but uncle and aunt. When the baby is stolen by Hurons, Elizabeth goes to the camp to bring the white child back, even if she has to raise it herself. What she doesn't realize is why the Hurons took the baby in the first place: to raise it in place of the baby they lost. Elizabeth has a hard decision to make. Ultimately, Elizabeth realizes the cost of stealing the child back will bring about more deaths and that the Huron couple will raise the child with love.
7	"The Vision"	Ken Girotti	Vivienne Radkoff	November 5, 1994
Chingachgook has a vision where in defense of Elizabeth, Hawkeye is shot in the back by an arrow. Elizabeth leaves the fort to help deliver the baby of a local woman whose husband is a colonial soldier. Unfortunately, a group of disgraced Delaware, who have been expelled from Chingachgook's tribe and are going about killing and stealing from colonials, surround the cabin. Despite the shaman's warning not to interfere with Hawkeye's destiny, Chingachgook goes to Elizabeth's aid and winds up injured. Hawkeye arrives in time to save the day, but thanks to Chingachgook's actions, Hawkeye doesn't die. Meanwhile, McKinney comes up with another get-rich-quick scheme involving a "miracle elixir".
8	"Out of the Past"	Neill Fearnley	William Bentley	November 12, 1994
An old friend of Hawkeye's shows up just after two Delaware Native Americans are murdered and scalped, and a third gets away, but is seriously wounded. Harry had found Hawkeye at age thirteen and taught him the ways of the woods, but Harry has changed and not for the better. His jealousy of Hawkeye and his past love leads to murderous intentions.
9	"The Warrior"	Ken Girotti	David Levinson	November 19, 1994
On the way to visit his aunt Elizabeth, young Andrew sees two Hurons meeting with a white man, but he doesn't see his face. Adjusting to life at the fort is difficult for young Andrew, especially since the white man he saw wants him dead. Hawkeye teaches the young man how to fight to defend himself, a skill he'll need when the fort is attacked. Andrew changes his mind about his future.
10	"The Quest"	Jeff Woolnough	Linda Elstad	November 26, 1994
Elizabeth, Hawkeye and Taylor go on a quest with a trapper and conman to follow up on information given to them that William is alive.
11	"The Escape"	Michael Caffey	Steve Feke & David Levinson	January 7, 1995
Two young men attempt to rob Elizabeth's store. One is caught and hung for it because it's a hanging offense to steal in a time of war. The brother who escaped sets up Taylor to be captured by the French. Elizabeth is along when Taylor is taken. It's up to Hawkeye, McKinney and Peevey to help Taylor and Elizabeth escape, yet Hawkeye runs afoul of the brother.
12	"Fly with Me"	Brad Turner	Ken Biller	January 14, 1995
Hawkeye, Elizabeth and Chingachgook help a couple of runaway slaves evade re-capture.
13	"The Ally"	George Bloomfield	Jon Boorstin	January 21, 1995
Claw, a Delaware tribesman, hates all Europeans and sparks a rebellion among the friendly Native Americans, forcing the English from their own fort. Even the efforts of Hawkeye and Chingachgook fail to bring peace between the allies.
14	"The Boxer"	Brad Turner	Steve Feke & David Levinson	January 28, 1995
A Frenchman (Luc) in the guise of a Huron is taken prisoner, but there is more to him than meets the eye. He fights differently and seems more intelligent than a regular soldier. He and Hawkeye have a respect for each other. They realize they could have been friends if "time and circumstances were different".
15	"The Traitor"	Jesús Salvador Treviño	Jon Boorstin	February 4, 1995
Hawkeye is accused of treason when Taylor is shot during an almost disastrous military campaign. The evidence proves that it was Hawkeye's rifle ball that shot Taylor, and Hawkeye is sentenced to face a firing squad.
16	"Amnesty"	Brad Turner	Kathryn Baker	February 11, 1995
A ne'er-do-well bully strikes a bargain with Taylor for amnesty against charges in exchange for information leading to the capture of a French general traveling incognito within a day's ride of the fort. The ruffian beats up McKinney and attacks Elizabeth. Hawkeye learns the information for Taylor and goes after the general himself.
17	"The Visit"	Jesús Salvador Treviño	Leon Tokatyan	February 18, 1995
Elizabeth's father comes for a visit to force her to go home to Virginia with him. He thinks she's having an affair with Hawkeye, but both deny it. Taylor sees an opportunity to lay his brother's memory to rest, but it backfires on him.
18	"Vengeance is Mine"	Brenton Spencer	Shelly Moore	February 25, 1995
A Native American woman is shot trying to escape. She wears a necklace belonging to Hawkeye's mother. He wants vengeance, but memories of what his father would say compete with other memories of the massacre.
19	"The Plague"	Michael Caffey	Vivienne Radkoff	March 4, 1995
Elizabeth accidentally invades Delaware sacred land while chasing a fleeing horse. She is seen by the shaman who informs the leader of his tribe about this fact. The Delaware law is clear about Elizabeth's destiny – she offended the sacred spirits, and unless she perishes in a violent ceremony, disgrace will fall upon the Delawares.
20	"Hester"	Jeff Woolnough	Sarah Bird	April 29, 1995
A mysterious woman arrives at the fort during an epidemic with secrets and help, but will rumors of her fleeing the Salem witch trials cause trouble?
21	"The Bounty"	Brenton Spencer	Shelly Moore	May 6, 1995
The French put a bounty on Hawkeye's life for blowing up their fort, for destroying their cannon and kidnapping their general. Meanwhile, a young woman from Hawkeye's past asks him for a favor.
22	"The Return"	Brad Turner	David Levinson	May 13, 1995
Elizabeth's missing husband, William, returns and everyone's lives will be affected. The torture he endured even as he gained the Huron's respect has addled his mind. Chingachgook is sure that William isn't safe. Taylor is at a loss, trying to cover up his misdeeds while Elizabeth and Hawkeye decide if they will tell William she wants to end her marriage or if she will stay with her husband.

== Home media ==
On March 22, 2011, Mill Creek Entertainment released Hawkeye – The Complete Series on DVD in Region 1. In June 2022, Visual Entertainment re-released Hawkeye – The Complete Series on DVD in Region 1.
