= The Public Domain (film) =

- Directed by: Patrick Coyle
- Written by: Patrick Coyle
- Produced by: Katelyn Haugdahl
- Starring: Mark Benninghofen; Emily Bridges; Peter Christian Hansen; Sara Marsh
- Release date: March 15, 2015
- Running time: 92min
- Country: United States
- Language: English

The Public Domain is a 2015 drama film set in Minneapolis, Minnesota. The film follows characters whose lives were impacted by the collapse of the I-35W Mississippi River bridge on August 1, 2007. The story takes place seven years later. It is centered in a bar in a Polish neighborhood named The Public Domain. The time is around the feast of Saint Casimir (March 4.)

The film was shot on location in Minneapolis and St. Paul. Budget came from the Minnesota Arts and Cultural Heritage Fund, through a reimbursement program administered by the Minnesota Film & TV board Independent Filmmaker Project Minnesota. To qualify, films have to be set in the state and/or have a strong Minnesota focus.

== Reception ==
The film had its official debut at the Lagoon Theater in the Uptown neighborhood of Minneapolis on Friday, March 27, 2015. Colin Covert of the Star Tribune gave it 3 out of 4 stars, stating "[Coyle] has given us a well-crafted small budget indie touching some painful, funny truths."
