= West (song) =

Song by The Alice Rose

from the album Phonographic Memory
- Released: 2006
- Recorded: February–April 2006; Congress House Studio, Austin, Texas
- Genre: Rock
- Length: 3:05
- Label: Emerald Wood Records
- Songwriter(s): JoDee Purkeypile

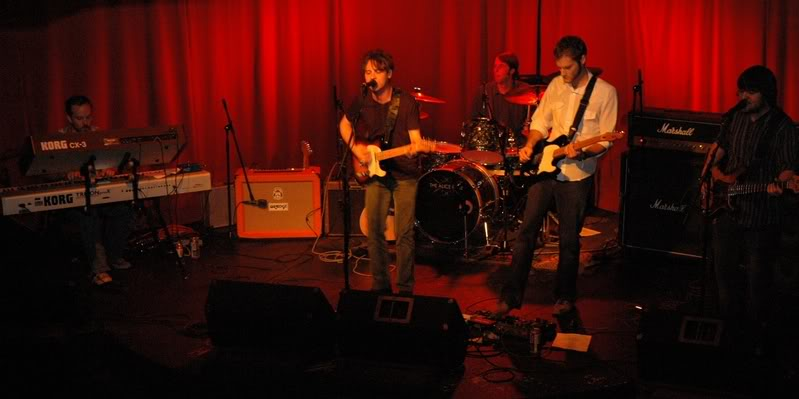
The Alice Rose live in June 2006.

"West" is a rock song by the indie rock band The Alice Rose, composed by JoDee Purkeypile, and released on the 2006 album Phonographic Memory. It was named NPR's "Song of the Day" on November 27, 2006. David Brown, host of KUT FM's "Texas Music Matters", called the song "oddly warm and instantly memorable". In 2008, the song was featured in the award-winning indie horror film Splinter by director Toby Wilkins.

== Personnel ==
- JoDee Purkeypile: Lead vocals, Rhythm guitar, Percussion
- Sean Crooks: Bass, Backing vocals
- Chris Sensat: Drums, Percussion
- Brendan Rogers: Piano, Organ
- Colin Slagle: Lead guitar

== Production credits ==
- Produced by Mark Hallman and The Alice Rose
- Engineer: Ned Stewart
- Recorded February – April 2006 at Congress House Studio, Austin, Texas
- Mixed and Mastered by Mark Hallman at Congress House Studio
- From the album Phonographic Memory (Emerald Wood Records, 11-10-2006)
