= Phonographic Memory =

Studio album by The Alice Rose
- Released: November 10, 2006
- Recorded: February – August, 2006 at Congress House Studio, Austin, Texas
- Genre: Indie rock, indie pop
- Length: 33:55
- Label: Emerald Wood Records
- Producer: Mark Hallman

The Alice Rose chronology
Phonographic Memory (2006)	All Haunt's Sound (2009)

Phonographic Memory is the first album by the indie pop group The Alice Rose, released November 10, 2006, on Emerald Wood Records. The album was recorded between February and August, 2006, at Congress House Studio in Austin, Texas, with producer Mark Hallman and engineer Ned Stewart. The record's 10 songs, written by the lead vocalist JoDee Purkeypile, draw heavily from 1960s' rock and 1980s' power pop influences.

Shortly after the record's release, the song "West" was named NPR's "Song of the Day" on November 27, 2006. Two years later, the song was used in the soundtrack to the award-winning independent horror film Splinter, directed by Toby Wilkins, released in October 2008.

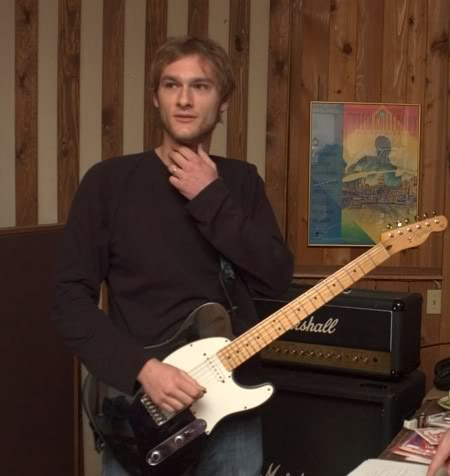
Colin Slagle at Congress House Studio during sessions for Phonographic Memory, March 2006.

== Track listing ==
1. "Light Up" 3:32
2. "Save Me" 2:43
3. "Lamplight" 3:44
4. "Ocean" 3:47
5. "Saints" 3:29
6. "All Over Your Body" 3:43
7. "Wisteria" 3:18
8. "West" 3:05
9. "Stop" 3:19
10. "This Night" 3:24
- All songs written by JoDee Purkeypile (2006 Emerald Wood Music, ASCAP)

== Notes ==
- A number of outtakes came from the album's sessions, and have yet to be re-recorded.
- The album's cover art was hand drawn by the drummer Chris Sensat's aunt, Alice Bourque.
- Two different variations of the album's inner sleeve exist. The first pressing has a group photograph by the photographer Jeremy Green, while the second pressing has recording session portraits by Chris Sensat.
- The songs "Save Me" and "Wisteria" are the band's first uses of a Mellotron, which was later used extensively on their subsequent recordings.
- JoDee Purkeypile, Sean Crooks and Chris Sensat had recorded an album with their first band, PigGie Hat, at Congress House Studio in 1998.

== Personnel ==
- JoDee Purkeypile: lead vocals, backing vocals, rhythm guitar, lead guitar ("All Over Your Body", "Wisteria", "West"), piano ("Lamplight", "Saints"), percussion
- Sean Crooks: bass guitar, backing vocals, percussion
- Chris Sensat: drums, percussion
- Brendan Rogers: organ, piano, Mellotron, percussion
- Colin Slagle: lead guitar, acoustic guitar

== Production credits ==
- Produced by Mark Hallman and The Alice Rose
- Recorded February–August 2006 at Congress House Studio, Austin, Texas.
- Engineer: Ned Stewart
- Mixed and mastered by Mark Hallman at Congress House Studio.
