= The Alice Rose =

American alternative rock band

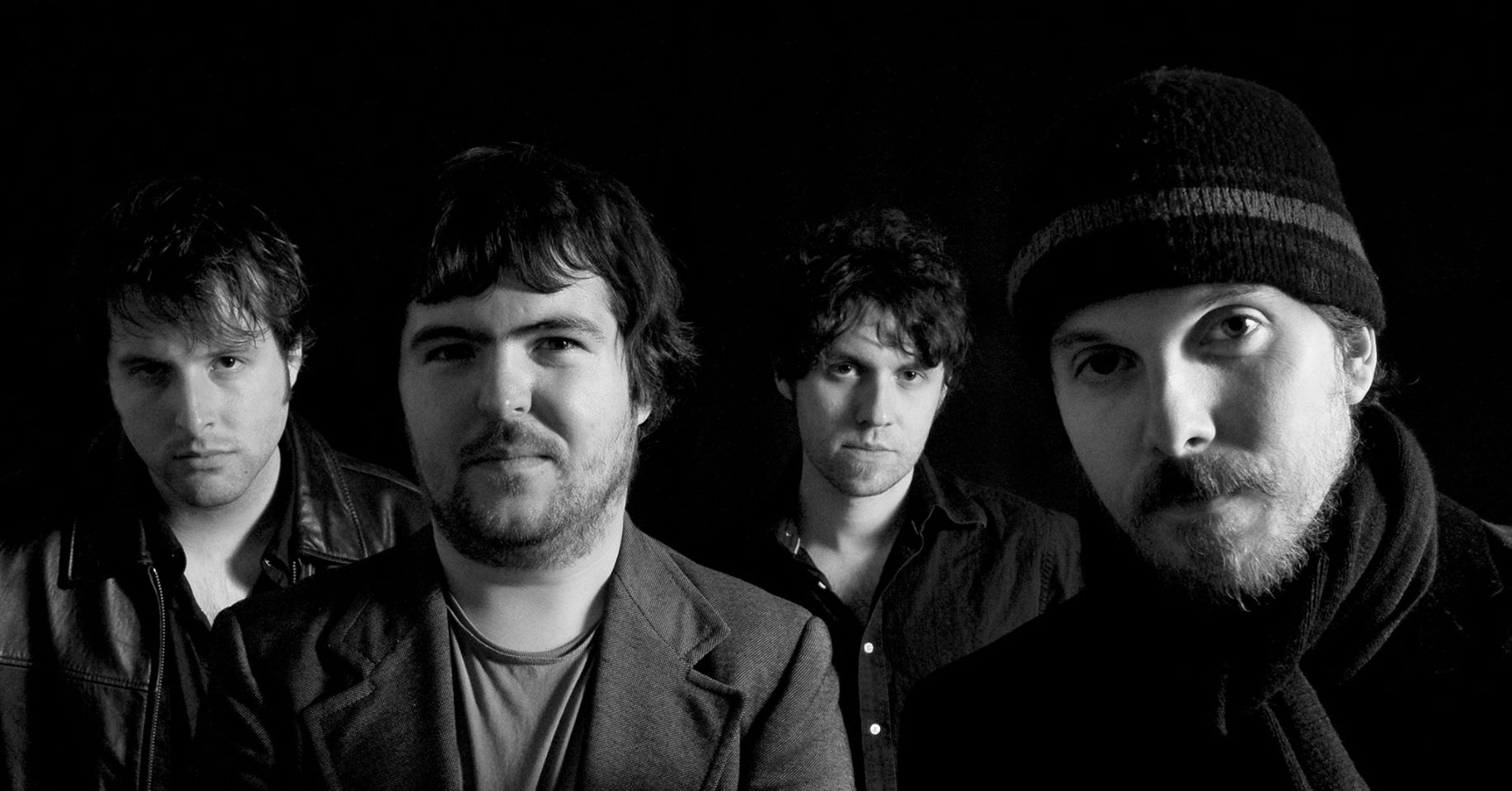
- The Alice Rose in 2010. Left to Right: Chris Sensat, Sean Crooks, JoDee Purkeypile, and Brendan Rogers.

Background information
- Origin: Austin, Texas, United States
- Genres: Indie rock, indie pop, psychedelic rock, power pop, Britpop, alternative rock
- Years active: 2000–2011 (Hiatus)
- Labels: Emerald Wood Records
- Past members: JoDee Purkeypile; Sean Crooks; Chris Sensat; Brendan Rogers

The Alice Rose were an indie pop/rock band from Austin, Texas, formed in 2000. The group's founding members are songwriter and guitarist JoDee Purkeypile, bassist Sean Crooks, and drummer Chris Sensat.

== 1995–2000 ==
13 year old JoDee Purkeypile met 14-year-old Sean Crooks at Roy Bedichek Junior High in 1995. The two began playing songs by Nirvana together in Sean's garage on equipment left behind and taken home by Sean's father, Danny Crooks, from his 6th Street nightclub, Steamboat. No sooner had they learned of each other's love of The Beatles that they began learning songs from a Beatles chord book. By 1996, the two were recording demos on a dual cassette deck, recording guitars and drums live, often using one microphone, then playing back the tape on the playback deck whilst recording vocals on another tape. JoDee received a 4-track Tascam portastudio cassette recorder that Christmas, and soon was recording a number of original songs and dubbing copies for friends. In early 1997, the duo began frequently performing at Rusty Wier's open mic nights held at Gino's, a Blues club in south Austin. They formed a band, calling themselves PigGie Hat, a name JoDee had conceived of years earlier which stood for "people getting high", and began playing short acoustic sets between acts at Steamboat. That summer, after a handful of shows with temporary rhythm sections, consisting of older musicians from various Steamboat affiliated bands, JoDee and Sean met 13 year old drummer Chris Sensat at Gino's. In October JoDee's childhood friend, 19-year-old Paul Murray, joined the band on bass. On New Year's Day 1998, PigGie Hat recorded their debut EP, Irish Rain, at Affordable Sound for $100. They debuted live at Steamboat on February 19, 1998, and went on to record a full-length album, also titled Irish Rain, and contributed a Christmas song to KLBJ-FM's Local Licks: Yule Rock! before disbanding in May 2000.

== 2000–2004 ==
After PigGie Hat's breakup, JoDee, Sean, and Chris formed The Alice Rose and debuted as a trio in May 2001. Purkeypile named the band after his ex-girlfriend's best friend, 16-year-old artist Sadie Warren, who died in a car accident in June 2000.

"I named us the Alice Rose in a sort of tribute to Sadie Warren, who was a young artist. I only knew her briefly, but her influence stuck with me. So, I named the band after her niece, who I'm sure has no idea. The name sort of embodied the kinds of songs I began to write at that time, and it had sort of a surreal quality to it."

After a few shows, they were joined by Yonkers, New York native Rob Seale on guitar and keyboardist Rachel Solomon in July. Solomon, whose father Andy was keyboardist of the 1960s rock band The Amboy Dukes, played only briefly with the band before leaving to attend the Berklee College of Music. Seale remained with the band until October 2002. The group experimented briefly with moving Sean onto guitar (who had only originally taken up bass due to the fact JoDee and Chris had refused to) in the Summer of 2003. Bassist Eamonn Comerford was recruited during these few uncertain months, but the idea was quickly dropped after a few shows. The band returned to performing as a trio throughout the rest of the year. In 2004, guitarist Brian Pearson was recruited and work began on the band's first album, recorded with producer Ron Flynt, of the 70's power pop band 20/20. Creative disagreements during the sessions led to Pearson's departure in late 2004, and the album was abandoned. Pearson went on to work with Andrew Sega in the synthpop band Iris.

== 2005–2011 ==
Nacogdoches, Texas-born keyboardist Brendan Rogers and lead guitarist Colin Slagle joined the band in the fall of 2005, and a fresh attempt at recording their first album began, working with producer Mark Hallman at Congress House Studio in Austin, Texas. Phonographic Memory was released November 10, 2006, on Emerald Wood Records, and was an instant critical success. KUT's David Brown said of the record, "...It's easy to understand how special this Austin-based band is: Every song on its debut sounds both strangely familiar and utterly new." A track from the record, "West", was named as NPR's "Song of the Day" on November 27, 2006, and was later featured in the soundtrack of the award-winning indie horror film "Splinter" by director Toby Wilkins, released in October 2008. Another track from the album, "Stop", was featured on Latchkey Record's Indy Route: Austin compilation, representing the state of Texas. After touring the United States in support of the album for most of 2007 and releasing a single, "Body Offering", guitarist Colin Slagle left the band.

In March 2008, Austin Monthly named The Alice Rose one of "8 Artists to Watch in 2008". The quartet began work on their second album that same month, working with producer and engineer Andy Sharp at Music Lane Studio in Austin. During the middle of the sessions, lead guitarist Gregg White joined the group in July. White's first appearance with band was on the Halloween single "Bloody Mary", engineered by JoDee at Emerald Wood Studio, and released October 31, 2008. White also contributed lead guitar on two songs on the album, "Waste Away", and "There's No One In There", both of which were recorded towards the end of the sessions that October in order to include his presence on the album. All Haunt's Sound was released on February 21, 2009 to mixed reviews. Some criticized the production as too radio friendly, while others, like the Austin Chronicle's Austin Powell, said of the record, "Not since Robert Harrison's Cotton Mather has an Austin band so successfully churned out power pop nuggets like the Alice Rose." The band followed up the album with a four track 7" vinyl EP, In a Daze, also recorded by JoDee, and released as a rare limited edition pressing of 100 copies on July 16, 2009, although digital downloads were made available to the group's fanclub. The band's next plan was to release a live album. An acoustic performance at Flipnotics and an electric set at Antone's were both recorded but were scrapped due to technical problems.

After the disappointment of All Haunt's Sound, the band's members pursued various side projects. After a handful of live performances in late 2011, The Alice Rose officially disbanded.

== 2010–present ==
JoDee Purkeypile began recording his first solo album, October House, in September 2010. Purkeypile wrote, recorded, and performed all instruments on the record's 12 songs. Like The Alice Rose in 2008, he was selected as one of Austin Monthly's "11 Artists to Watch" in March 2011, and was honored with "JoDee Purkeypile Day" in Austin on July 28, 2011, the same day October House was released. After a successful Kickstarter.com campaign, recording sessions for his second solo album, Messenger, took place in August, 2012 with engineer and producer Matthew Smith, who had previously worked with fellow Austin band The Eastern Sea. The album was released February 19, 2013. In August 2016, Purkeypile, along with Sean Crooks, Brendan Rogers, and guitarists Jason Morris and Esther Garcia, began recording sessions under the name Salem Walk, named after the street Purkeypile grew up on. Two songs culled from the sessions, "Invade" and "Mystery Design", were released as a 7" in June 2017. Salem Walk disbanded in June 2018. Chris Sensat released his first solo album, Rye, on May 18, 2018. The instrumental album was produced by Sensat's Bellfuries bandmate, guitarist Mike Molnar, and features contributions from organist Red Young. Purkeypile released a collection of his 1999 4-track recordings as 4-Track Archives: 1999 digitally on February 14, 2019, followed on July 19 by the single "What I'm Missing" b/w "Never Is Not", two songs taken from the August 2016 sessions.

== Side projects ==
- Acid Tomb is a 13th Floor Elevators tribute band. Brendan Rogers plays electric jug by connecting a microphone into a Leslie speaker, emulating the "gurgling" effect heard on the Elevators' records. The band donates all proceeds to the Roky Erickson Trust.
- Planet Rye Co is a psychedelic 1960's inspired Garage rock project begun primarily by JoDee in 2001 as an outlet for more experimental songs and recordings. In October 2009, all four members of The Alice Rose debuted the band live. On stage the band frequently switch instruments, most often with Sean and Chris swapping bass and drum duties. They also utilize sound effects, such as wind, footsteps, feedback, and spoken word pieces, in their live performances. The album Salem Songs was released October 1, 2010, on Emerald Wood Records.
- The Battlemen have been described as "Renaissance Rock", and "Monty Python meets Spinal Tap". Like Planet Rye Co, JoDee, Sean, Chris, and Brendan share songwriting and lead vocal duties and frequently switch instruments. The band dresses in hand-sewn tunics and wigs while portraying English alter-egos. The Battlemen released a double album, Call to Arms / Castle of Mental Horrors, February 4, 2011, on Emerald Wood Records.

== Members ==
- JoDee Purkeypile: Vocals, Guitar
- Sean Crooks: Bass, Vocals
- Chris Sensat: Drums, Vocals
- Brendan Rogers: Keyboards, Vocals

=== Former members ===
- Rachel Solomon: Keyboard (2001)
- Rob Seale: Guitar (2001–2002)
- Eamonn Comerford: Bass (2003)
- Brian Pearson: Guitar (2004)
- Colin Slagle: Guitar (2005–2007)
- Gregg White: Guitar (2008–2009)

== Discography ==
- Phonographic Memory (2006, Emerald Wood Records, CD)
- "Body Offering" (2008, Emerald Wood Records, CD single, 7" vinyl)
- "Bloody Mary" (2008, Emerald Wood Records, CD single, 7" vinyl)
- All Haunt's Sound (2009, Emerald Wood Records, CD)
- In a Daze (2009, Emerald Wood Records, 7" vinyl)

=== Discography (Side projects) ===
- PigGie Hat - Irish Rain EP (January 1, 1998, self-release, CD)
- PigGie Hat - Irish Rain (December 1, 1998, self-release, CD)
- PigGie Hat - "Do You Remember December?", Local Licks: Yule Rock! (December 1999, KLBJ, CD)
- Planet Rye Co - "Vegetable Man" (Syd Barrett), Vegetable Man Project Volume 6 (Italian self-release, December 2009, CD)
- Planet Rye Co - Salem Songs (October 1, 2010, Emerald Wood Records, CD)
- The Battlemen - Call to Arms / Castle of Mental Horrors (February 4, 2011, Emerald Wood Records, CD)
- JoDee Purkeypile - October House (July 28, 2011, Emerald Wood Records, CD)
- JoDee Purkeypile - Move Along (August 13, 2012, Emerald Wood Records, 7" vinyl)
- JoDee Purkeypile - Messenger (February 19, 2013, Emerald Wood Records, CD, vinyl)
- Salem Walk - "Invade" b/w "Mystery Design" (June 10, 2017, Emerald Wood Records, 7" vinyl)
- Chris Sensat - Rye (May 18, 2018, self release, digital)
- JoDee Purkeypile - 4-Track Archives: 1999 (February 15, 2019, Emerald Wood Records, digital)
- JoDee Purkeypile - "What I'm Missing" b/w "Never Is Not" (July 19, 2019, Emerald Wood Records, 7" vinyl)

== See also ==
- Music of Austin
- List of power pop artists and songs
