= Talhotblond =

Talhotblond may refer to:

- Talhotblond (2009 film), documentary directed by Barbara Schroeder
- Talhotblond (2012 film), TV film directed by Courteney Cox
