= Lucy Lang =

Inspector General of New York

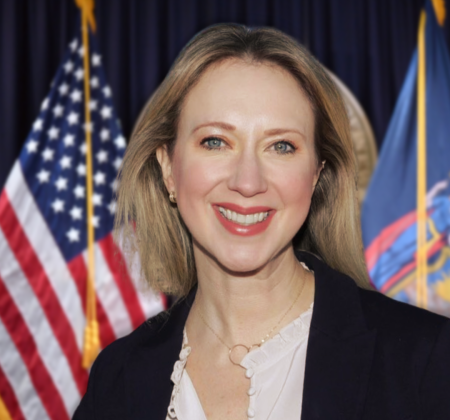
- Lang in 2021

Inspector General of New York
- Incumbent
- Assumed office October 21, 2021
- Governor: Kathy Hochul
- Preceded by: Letizia Tagliafierro

Personal details
- Born: Lucy Jane Lang; March 13, 1981 (age 45) New York City, U.S.
- Party: Democratic
- Domestic partner: Scott Asher (2009-present)
- Children: 2
- Parent: Stephen Lang (father)
- Relatives: Eugene Lang (grandfather); Jane Lang (aunt)
- Education: Swarthmore College (BA); Columbia University (JD)

Lucy Lang (born March 13, 1981) is an American attorney, author, and the 11th Inspector General of New York.

== Life ==
Born in New York City, Lang is the daughter of Kristina Lang (née Watson) and American actor Stephen Lang, and the granddaughter of Theresa Lang (née Volmer) and education reformer Eugene M. Lang, who founded the I Have A Dream Foundation. She has one sister, artist Grace, and two brothers, Daniel and Noah, both filmmakers.

Lang graduated with high honors from Swarthmore College in 2003 with a degree in political science and history and a concentration in interpretation theory. She earned her Juris Doctor (J.D.) from the Columbia University School of Law in 2006.

Since 2009, Lang has been in a relationship with Scott Asher. They reside in Harlem with their son and daughter.

== Career ==
In 2006, Lang began her career as an Assistant DA in Manhattan under District Attorney Robert M. Morgenthau, first in the Appeals Bureau and later in the Trial Division. Under DA Cyrus R. Vance, Jr., she served as Special Counsel to the District Attorney as well as executive director of the in-house think tank, the Manhattan D.A. Academy, which expanded legal training for prosecutors and developed prosecutorial reform policy. There she created a program called Inside Criminal Justice, a first-of-its kind college class for prosecutors and incarcerated students to study criminal justice together inside of a prison.

Lang became the executive director of the Institute for Innovation in Prosecution in 2018, working with prosecutors and communities to promote safety, fairness, and dignity in the criminal legal system. Under her leadership, the Institute for Innovation in Prosecution has advocated for criminal justice reforms and focused on reducing police involved shootings and fatalities, creating national prosecutorial guidelines to increase accountability and calling for increased support for victims of police violence .

In August 2020, Lang began her campaign for Manhattan District Attorney, citing the impact of the coronavirus in New York and protests against police brutality sparked by the murder of George Floyd as motivating factors in her decision to enter the race. Lang conceded the race on June 23, 2021. Alvin Bragg was declared the winner on July 20, 2021.

On October 21, 2021, Lang was appointed as the 11th Inspector General of the State of New York of New York State by Governor Kathleen Hochul and remains in that office to date.

=== 2021 NY County District Attorney race ===
Lang was a candidate in the 2021 Democratic Primary for Manhattan District Attorney. Lang has been endorsed by progressive prosecutors from across the country, including Marilyn Mosby, Sherry Boston, Sarah Fair George, John Choi, Kimberly Gardner, and Scott Colom. Lang was considered a top contender in the Democratic race for Manhattan DA, as the longest serving alumna of the Manhattan District Attorney's office in the race. Lang had an extensive policy platform and had gained national attention from her time as a policy expert advising prosecutors across the country.

Lang conceded the race on June 23, 2021. Alvin Bragg was declared the winner on July 20, 2021.

== Selected honors ==
In 2021 Lang was named one of Worth Magazine's 50 Women Changing the World.

In 2015 Lang was named a Rising Star by the New York Law Journal in 2015.

She was a member of the 2017 Class of Presidential Leadership Scholars, a program launched in 2014 by former U.S. Presidents Bill Clinton and George W. Bush and served as a term member on the Council on Foreign Relations.

== Other ==
Lang is the author of March On! a children's book about women’s suffrage released in recognition of the 100th anniversary of the 19th Amendment.
