= In a Daze =

EP by The Alice Rose
- Released: July 16, 2009
- Recorded: April 2009
- Studio: Emerald Wood Studio, Austin, Texas
- Genre: indie rock, indie pop
- Label: Emerald Wood Records
- Producer: JoDee Purkeypile

The Alice Rose chronology
| All Haunt's Sound (2009) | In a Daze (2009) |

In a Daze is a 7" EP by The Alice Rose, released on July 16, 2009, on Emerald Wood Records. The record contains four songs written by lead vocalist JoDee Purkeypile, and was recorded at his home studio, Emerald Wood, on analog 8-track recording equipment. It is the last release to feature guitarist Gregg White. Only 100 copies of the vinyl EP were pressed, although the band made the entire release available as a digital download to their fanclub.

== Track listing ==
Side A

1. "Awaken You" 2:56
2. "Black Tresses" 3:01

Side B

1. "Silent Mary" 2:17
2. "In a Daze" 3:33

== Notes ==
- "Silent Mary" was originally intended for Planet Rye Co, the band's psychedelic side project.
- The cover art was created by Chris Sensat.

== Personnel ==
- JoDee Purkeypile: Lead vocals, backing vocals, Acoustic guitar, Rhythm guitar, Mellotron ("Black Tresses")
- Sean Crooks: Bass, Backing vocals ("Black Tresses", "Silent Mary", "In a Daze")
- Chris Sensat: Drums, Backing vocals ("Awaken You", "In a Daze"), Percussion
- Brendan Rogers: Organ, Piano, Mellotron, Harmonium ("Awaken You")
- Gregg White: Lead guitar
