= Sprenger =

Sprenger is a surname. Notable people with the surname include:

- Aloys Sprenger, 19th-century Austrian orientalist
- Carl Ludwig Sprenger, 19th-century German botanist
- Christian Sprenger (swimmer) (born 1985), Australian breaststroke swimmer
- Christian Sprenger (handballer) (born 1983), German handball player
- Hans Sprenger (born 1948), German footballer
- Jakob Sprenger (1884–1945), German politician of the Nazi era
- Jacob Sprenger (also Jacob, Jakob, etc.), 15th-century inquisitor-general of the Roman Catholic Church in Germany
- Jan Michael Sprenger (born 1982), German chess grandmaster
- Nicholas Sprenger (born 1985), Australian competitive swimmer
- Paul Sprenger, American attorney
- Peter Sprenger (1953–2018), Liechtenstein politician
- Sherrie Sprenger, American politician
- Justin Sprenger, Professional Baseball Player
