= Inside the Vault =

- Genre: News magazine
- Created by: Joel Ewanick
- Directed by: Barb Sherwood
- Presented by: Cris Collinsworth; Alonzo Bodden; Jill Wagner
- Country of origin: United States
- Original language: English
- No. of seasons: 1
- No. of episodes: 10

Production
- Executive producers: Lisa Gregorisch Dempsey; Jeremy Spiegel
- Producers: Paul Edwards; Megan Stooke; Brian Terkelsen; Mike Rosen; Matt Sharon; Ryan Foley
- Editors: David Milhous; Terren Lin
- Running time: 22 min

Original release
- Network: WGN America
- Release: February 4 – April 10, 2011

Inside the Vault is an American news magazine television show hosted by Cris Collinsworth that focuses on today's American man. The show debuted online on February 3, 2011, and February 4, 2011, on WGN America. After its first season no plans were announced for a second season.

== Format ==
Each episode of Inside the Vault examined a theme of contemporary male interest. Topics covered included automotives, fashion, fatherhood, food, fitness, hobbies, philanthropy, sports, technology, travel, work-life balance, wellness, and American identity. Hosts and panelists viewed pre-taped segments relevant to the theme, and then discussed it in a round-table format.

== Cast ==
=== Hosts ===
Inside the Vault is hosted by sports analyst Cris Collinsworth and co-hosted by Last Comic Standing winner Alonzo Bodden and Wipeout co-host Jill Wagner.

=== Panelists ===
The series includes lifestyle segments from experts from Condé Nast and Source Interlink Media magazines and websites, including:

- Angus MacKenzie – Editor-in-Chief, Motor Trend
- Nicholas Thompson – Senior Editor, The New Yorker
- Michael Hogan – Executive Online Editor, Vanity Fair
- Krista Smith – Senior West Coast Editor, Vanity Fair
- Andrew Knowlton – Restaurant Editor, Bon Appétit
- Jason Tanz – Senior Editor, Wired
- Alex Pasquariello – Associate Editor, Condé Nast Traveler
- Michael Hainey – Deputy Editor, GQ
- Jesse Ashlock – Senior Editor, Details

== Episodes ==
No.	Title	Original release date
1	"Technology: Gadget Obsessions"	February 4, 2011
2	"Travel: Your Next Vacation"	February 13, 2011
3	"Food: Steaks & Beyond"	February 20, 2011
4	"American Spirit: What Drives Men"	February 27, 2011
5	"Health: The Real Wealth"	March 6, 2011
6	"Work/Life: Striking A Balance"	March 13, 2011
7	"Sports: Man’s Obsession"	March 20, 2011
8	"Personal Pursuits: Life Outside Work"	March 27, 2011
9	"Style: Men’s Fashion"	April 3, 2011
10	"Fatherhood: Being A Dad Today"	April 10, 2011

== Production ==
The program is co-produced by Telepictures Productions, LiquidThread, Source Interlink Media, and Condé Nast.
