= The Last Deal =

2023 crime thriller film

The Last Deal is a 2023 American crime thriller film written and directed by Jonathan Salemi. It stars Anthony Molinari, Sala Baker, Jeffri Lauren, Mister Fitzgerald, Mike Ferguson and Audra Van Hees. The film premiered at The Boston International Film Festival on April 15, 2022 where Salemi won The Best Director Award at the festival. The film later went on to make its Los Angeles premiere at Dances With Films on June 10, 2022. Scatena & Rosner Films gave the film a limited 22 theater release in the United States on February 3, 2023 before the film premiered on Starz in June 2023. The crime thriller received acclaim from critics, who praised Salemi's direction and large production scope albeit the film's low budget, and the performance of Molinari. The film was included in The New York Times "Five Action Films to Stream Now".

== Plot ==
Inspired by true events, the film is about a black market marijuana dealer that tries to make one final score before getting squeezed out of the business when cannabis becomes legal.

== Release ==
The Last Deal had its world premiere at the Boston International Film Festival on April 15, 2022, taking home the Best Director Award for Salemi. The film later screened at Dances With Films on June 10, 2022 at Grauman's Chinese Theater in Hollywood, California. It received a limited 22 theater release in the United States on February 3, 2023 before the film premiered on Starz in June 2023.

== Reception ==
The film has a 100% on Rotten Tomatoes from critics and was included in The New York Times' "Five Action Films to Stream Now".

The film won a Best Director award for Jonathan Salemi at the Boston International Film Festival and won the jury prize for Best Performance for Molinari at the San Antonio Film Festival.
