= Garret Dillahunt =

American actor (born 1964)

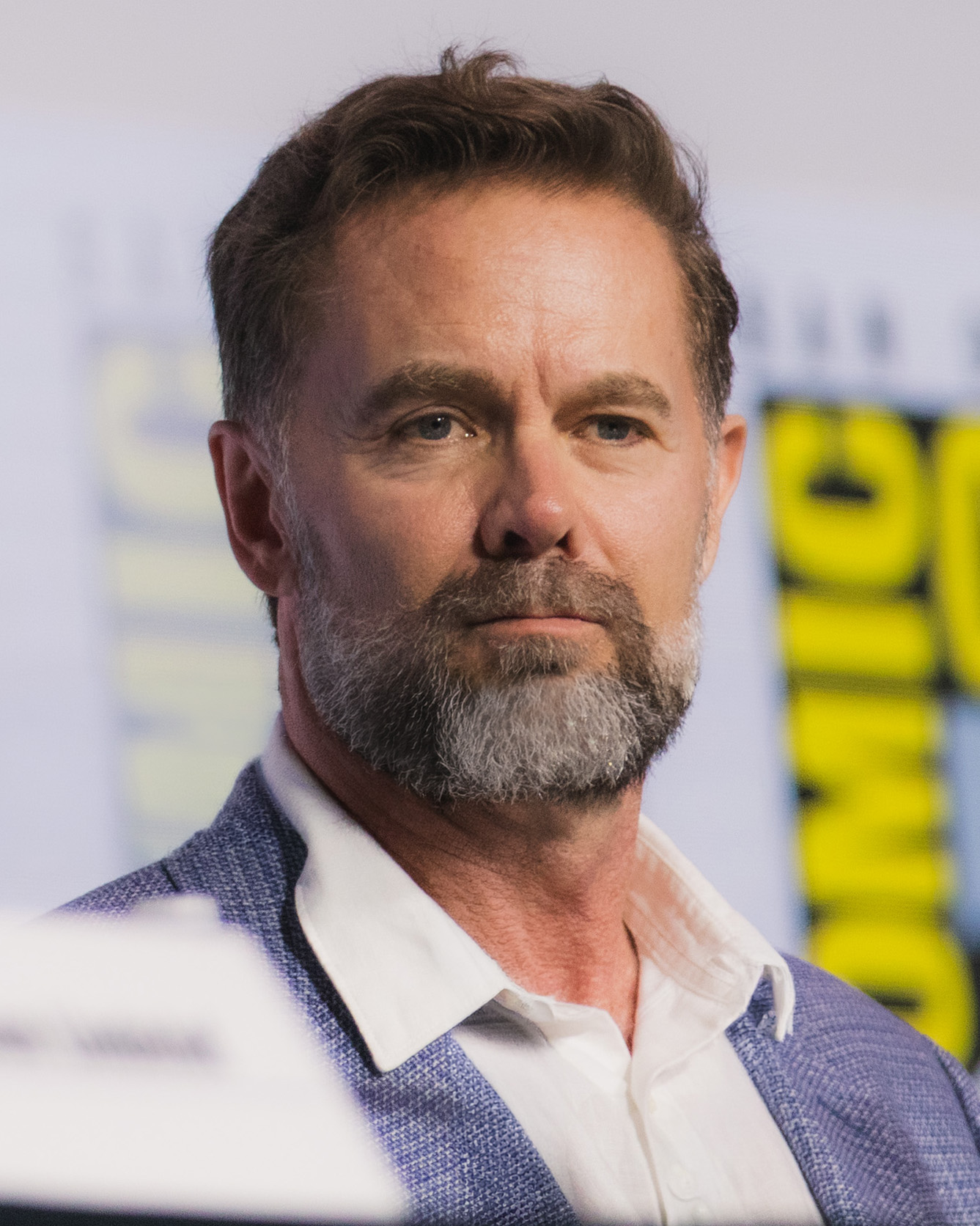
- Dillahunt in 2026
- Born: Garret Lee Dillahunt; November 24, 1964 (age 61); Castro Valley, California, U.S.
- Education: University of Washington (BA); New York University (MFA)
- Occupation: Actor
- Years active: 1991–present
- Spouse: Michelle Hurd (m. 2007)
- Website: www.garret-dillahunt.net

Garret Lee Dillahunt (born November 24, 1964) is an American actor. He is best known for his work in television, including the roles Burt Chance on the Fox sitcom Raising Hope, for which he was nominated for the Critics' Choice Television Award for Best Actor in a Comedy Series, Jack McCall and Francis Wolcott in Deadwood, and John Dorie in Fear the Walking Dead. He has also appeared in The 4400, ER, Against the Sun, Terminator: The Sarah Connor Chronicles, Burn Notice, Justified, and The Mindy Project. He starred in the Amazon Studios drama series Hand of God (2014–2017) and the HBO superhero series Lanterns (2026).

In film, Dillahunt has played supporting roles in No Country for Old Men, The Assassination of Jesse James by the Coward Robert Ford, Winter's Bone, Looper, and 12 Years a Slave.

== Early life and education ==
Garret Dillahunt was born in Castro Valley, California, the middle of three boys, and was raised in Selah, Washington, a suburb of Yakima. In late 1981, Dillahunt's elder brother, Eric, died in a road accident near Ellensburg, after the car he was traveling in as a passenger, whose driver was drunk and speeding at the time, veered off the road.

After high school, Dillahunt attended the University of Washington, from which he graduated in 1987 with a B.A. in journalism, before earning an MFA in acting at New York University.

== Career ==
After spending years appearing in theatrical productions on and off Broadway, Dillahunt began pursuing television and film roles. He appeared as a regular in several short lived series on ABC and Showtime, and landed guest spots on TV shows such as The X-Files and NYPD Blue among others, before playing two distinctly different characters on the HBO series Deadwood: Jack McCall in 2004 and Francis Wolcott in 2005 (Dillahunt returned in an uncredited role as a townsman in the 2019 Deadwood movie). He later had a recurring role on USA Network's The 4400.

Dillahunt portrayed Steve Curtis for three seasons on ER (2005–06). Later roles included Dr. Michael Smith on HBO's John from Cincinnati; Cromartie, John Henry and George Laszlo on FOX's Terminator: The Sarah Connor Chronicles; Roman Nevikov, a Russian gangster, on NBC's Life; and Mason Turner, a paralyzed serial killer on Criminal Minds. He played Simon Escher in the Burn Notice third-season finale airing March 4, 2010 on USA, later reprising the role in the show's fourth and seventh seasons.

Dillahunt appeared in such films as The Assassination of Jesse James by the Coward Robert Ford, No Country for Old Men, The Road, Winter's Bone, The Last House On The Left, TalhotBlond, and the indie horror film Burning Bright.

From 2010 to 2014, Dillahunt co-starred as Burt Chance on the Fox comedy Raising Hope. He began a recurring role on The Mindy Project in 2015 and on The Guest Book in 2017.

Dillahunt starred in the 2018 action film Braven directed by Lin Oeding. Dillahunt played Kassen, the leader of a group of mercenaries and drug runners who retrieve the drug stash and plan to kill Joe Braven and his family. He joined the regular cast of the fourth season of Fear the Walking Dead as John Dorie.

== Personal life ==
In 2007, Dillahunt married actress Michelle Hurd, daughter of actor Hugh Hurd.

== Filmography ==
Key
†	Denotes works that have not yet been released

=== Film ===
Year	Title	Role	Notes
1999	Last Call	Curtis	
2001	The Believer	Billings	
2007	No Country for Old Men	Wendell	Screen Actors Guild Award for Outstanding Performance by a Cast in a Motion Picture
2007	The Assassination of Jesse James by the Coward Robert Ford	Ed Miller	
2008	Pretty Bird	Carson Thrash	
2008	John's Hand	John	Short film
2009	Water Pills	Hal	Short film
2009	The Last House on the Left	Krug Stillo	
2009	The Road	Gang Member	
2009	One Night Only	Richard	Short film
2010	Winter's Bone	Sheriff Baskin	
2010	Amigo	Lt. Compton	
2010	Burning Bright	Johnny Gaveneau	
2010	Oliver Sherman	Sherman Oliver	
2012	Any Day Now	Paul Fliger	
2012	Revenge for Jolly!	Gary	
2012	Killing Them Softly	Eddie Mattie	
2012	Talhotblond	Thomas Montgomery	
2012	Looper	Jesse	
2013	Houston	Robert Wagner	
2013	12 Years a Slave	Armsby	
2014	The Scribbler	Hogan	
2014	Just Before I Go	Lucky Morgan	
2015	Against the Sun	Harold Dixon	
2015	Thrilling Adventure Hour Live	Techs	
2015	Beast	Rick Grey	
2016	Come and Find Me	John Hall	
2017	Wheelman	Clayton	
2018	Braven	Kassen	
2018	Benched	Michael	
2018	Widows	Bash O'Reilly	
2020	Sergio	William von Zehle	
2021	Army of the Dead	Martin	
2022	Ambulance	Captain Monroe	
2022	Where the Crawdads Sing	"Pa" Clark	
2022	Blonde	Boss	Uncredited
2023	Gray Matter	Derek	
2023	The Dead Don't Hurt	Alfred Jeffries	
2023	A Million Miles Away	Frederick W. Sturckow	
2024	Red Right Hand	Wilder	
2025	Sarah's Oil	Devnan	
2026	Ghost Soldier	Graves	
TBA	Evil Genius †	TBA	Post-production
TBA	The Long Home †	Bellwether	Completed; filmed in 2015

=== Television ===
Year	Title	Role	Notes
1993–1994	One Life to Live	Charlemagne Moody	7 episodes
1996	NYPD Blue	Bryce Coopersmith	Episode: "Where'd the Van Gogh?"
1998	The X-Files	Edward Skur	Episode: "Travelers"
1998	Maximum Bob	Deputy Dawson Hayes	3 episodes
1998	Remembering Sex	Chris Goodman	Television film
1998	Seven Days	Kevin Poe	Episode: "The Gettysburg Virus"
1998	Millennium	Rick Van Horn	Episode: "Closure"
2001	Leap Years	Gregory Paget	20 episodes
2002	Law & Order	Julian Preuss	Episode: "Open Season"
2003	CSI: Crime Scene Investigation	Luke	Episode: "Precious Metal"
2003–2004	A Minute with Stan Hooper	Lou Peterson	13 episodes
2004	Mr. Ed	Jim Hendry	Television film
2004–2005	Deadwood	Jack McCall	Recurring role (season 1), 6 episodes
2004–2005	Deadwood	Francis Wolcott	Main role (season 2), 10 episodes
2005	The Inside	Karl Robie Jr.	Episode: "Little Girl Lost"
2005	CSI: NY	Steve Collins	Episode: "What You See Is What You See"
2005–2006	The 4400	Matthew Ross	11 episodes
2005–2006	ER	Steve Curtis	5 episodes
2006	The Book of Daniel	Jesus	8 episodes
2006	Law & Order	Eric Lund	Episode: "Kingmaker"
2006	Numbers	Jack Tollner	Episode: "Provenance"
2007	John from Cincinnati	Dr. Michael Smith	8 episodes
2007	Damages	Marshall Phillips	4 episodes
2007	The Line-Up	Theo Harrison	Television film
2007–2009	Life	Roman Nevikov	3 episodes
2008–2009	Terminator: The Sarah Connor Chronicles	Cromartie / John Henry / George Laszlo	18 episodes
2009	Criminal Minds	Mason Turner	Episode: "To Hell... And Back"
2009	CSI: Crime Scene Investigation	Tom O'Neill	Episode: "Family Affair"
2009	Lie to Me	Eric Matheson	Episode: "Honey"
2009	Law & Order: Special Victims Unit	Kevin O'Donnell	Episode: "Hardwired"
2009	White Collar	Patrick Aimes	Episode: "Flip of the Coin"
2010	Gary Unmarried	Goose	Episode: "Gary Unmarried?"
2010	The Glades	Eddie Strickland	Episode: "A Perfect Storm"
2010–2013	Burn Notice	Simon Escher	3 episodes
2010–2014	Raising Hope	Burt Chance	88 episodes
2011	Memphis Beat	Tim Wayne	Episode: "Body of Evidence"
2011	Alphas	Jonas Englin	Episode: "A Short Time in Paradise"
2012	TallhotBlond	Thomas Montgomery	Television film
2013	Newsreaders	Mikhail Rousseau	Episode: "CCSI: Boston"
2013–2014	Paloma	Matthew	4 episodes
2014	Elementary	Bart MacIntosh	Episode: "No Lack of Void"
2014–2017	Hand of God	Keith "KD" Dennison	20 episodes
2015	Justified	Ty Walker	8 episodes
2015	Brooklyn Nine-Nine	Detective Dave Majors	Episode: "Det. Dave Majors"
2015–2017	The Mindy Project	Dr. Jody Kimball-Kinney	Main role (seasons 4–6); 38 episodes
2017	Blindspot	Travis	Episode: "Senile Lines"
2017	Arkansas Traveler	Wayland McGlawhorn	6 episodes
2017–2018	The Guest Book	Dr. Andrew Brown	11 episodes
2017–2018	The Gifted	Dr. Roderick Campbell	9 episodes
2018–2021	Fear the Walking Dead	John Dorie	28 episodes
2019	Deadwood: The Movie	Drunk #2	Television film; uncredited
2022	Sprung	Jack	9 episodes
2022	Dead to Me	Glenn Moranis	3 episodes
2023	Ghosts of Beirut	William Buckley	Episode: "Hunted"
2024	Hightown	Shane Frawley	6 episodes
2024	Hysteria!	The Reverend	6 episodes
2024–2025	High Potential	Lieutenant Melon	4 episodes
2026	Lanterns	William Macon	4 episodes
2026	Tires	Thatch	2 episodes

== Stage credits ==
Year	Title	Role	Notes	Ref.
1991	Mad Forest	Ianos/Painter	Perry Street Theatre	
1992	Mad Forest	Ianos/Painter	New York City Center	
1994	Angels in America	Prior Walter	Marines Memorial Theater	
1994	Booth	Edwin	York Theatre	
1994	The Triumph of Love	Agis	East 13th Street Theater	
1996	The Father	Nöjd	Criterion Center Stage Right	
1996	Inherit the Wind	Bertram Cates	Royale Theatre	
2009	Things of Dry Hours	Corbin Teel	New York Theatre Workshop	
2024	Shit. Meet. Fan.	Brett	MCC Theater	
