= Sala Baker =

New Zealand actor and stuntman

- Born: 22 September 1976 (age 49); Wellington, New Zealand
- Occupations: Actor; stuntman
- Years active: 2001–present

Sala Baker (born 22 September 1976) is a New Zealand actor and stuntman. He is best known for portraying the villain Sauron in the Lord of the Rings trilogy by Peter Jackson.

== Career ==
Originally hired as one of several stunt performers for The Lord of the Rings film trilogy, he ended up landing the part of the Dark Lord Sauron. In addition, he also played several Orcs, a Gondorian, and one of the Rohirrim. Outside of The Lord of the Rings trilogy, Baker has performed in The Chronicles of Narnia: The Lion, the Witch and the Wardrobe, two Pirates of the Caribbean movies, Sherlock Holmes: A Game of Shadows, Deadpool 2, Braven, Sleepless, and Mile 22.

Baker was also a part of the miscellaneous crew in the making of The Last Samurai in 2003.

In 2023, Baker played one of the leads in the Starz feature crime thriller The Last Deal. He followed that with a role in David Fincher's action film The Killer.

== Filmography ==
=== Actor ===
==== Film ====
Year	Title	Role	Notes
2001	The Lord of the Rings: The Fellowship of the Ring	Sauron and Lugdush	Voiced by Alan Howard as Sauron
2002	The Lord of the Rings: The Two Towers	Sauron and Lugdush	Haradrim warrior
2003	The Lord of the Rings: The Return of the King	Sauron and Murgash	Voiced by Alan Howard as Sauron
2003	Pirates of the Caribbean: The Curse of the Black Pearl	Stunts	
2005	The Chronicles of Narnia: The Lion, the Witch and the Wardrobe	Stunts	
2006	Potheads: The Movie	Grim	
2006	F8	Bouncer	
2006	Pirates of the Caribbean: Dead Man's Chest	Stunts	
2007	Next	Stunts	
2007	Epic Movie	Stunts	
2007	The Kingdom	Kidnapper	Uncredited
2007	Pirates of the Caribbean: At World's End	Pirate	
2008	Stiletto	Store Clerk	
2008	The Prince of Venice	Lani	
2009	Race to Witch Mountain	Stunts	
2009	Gamer	Mercenary	Uncredited
2009	Star Trek	Drill Tower Romulan	Uncredited
2009	Blood and Bone	Jesus	
2010	The Expendables	Mercenary	Uncredited
2010	The Book of Eli	Construction Thug	
2010	The A-Team	Man	Uncredited
2011	Sherlock Holmes: A Game of Shadows	Stunts	Uncredited
2012	Contraband	Stunts	
2012	Savages	Motorcycle Cop	
2012	Battleship	Soldier	Uncredited
2013	Parker	Ernesto	Uncredited
2013	Iron Man 3	Extremis Soldier	
2014	Falcon Rising	Gang Member 2	Uncredited
2014	The Equalizer	Teddy's Guy	
2014	Transcendence	Stunts	Uncredited
2015	Ant-Man	Stunts	Uncredited
2016	Captain America: Civil War	Stunts	Uncredited
2016	The Nice Guys	Body Guard	Uncredited
2016	79 Parts	Gonzo	
2016	Deadpool	Stunts	Uncredited
2016	Central Intelligence	Body Guard	Uncredited
2017	Fist Fight	Stunts	
2017	Bright	Gang Banger	Uncredited
2017	Sleepless	Henchmen	Uncredited
2018	Braven	Mercenary	Uncredited
2018	Deadpool 2	Older Firefist	Uncredited
2018	Mile 22	Assassin	
2021	Jungle Cruise	Body Guard	
2023	The Last Deal	The Boss	
2023	The Killer	The Brute	

==== Television ====
Year	Title	Role	Notes
2007	24	Stunts	2 Episodes - Uncredited
2007	Prison Break	World	Uncredited
2008	The Unit	Luis	Uncredited
2009	Chuck	Terrorist Bodyguard	Uncredited
2013	NCIS: Los Angeles	Henchman #1	Uncredited
2013	True Blood	Vampire	2 Episodes - Uncredited
2013	The Mentalist	Stunts	4 Episodes - Uncredited
2014	The Last Ship	Stunts	Uncredited
2014	The Mentalist	Stunts	3 Episodes
2015	The Player	Stunts	Uncredited
2016	Power Rangers Dino Super Charge	Lord Arcanon	Uncredited
2017	Iron Fist	Stunts	Uncredited
2018	Mayans M.C.	Stunts	Uncredited
2018	Westworld	Arno	Uncredited
2019	The Mandalorian	Klatooinian Raider Captain	
2020	The Rookie	Daxton Reid	

=== Stunts ===
- The Lord of the Rings: The Fellowship of the Ring (2001): Stunt Performers
- The Lord of the Rings: The Two Towers (2002): Stunt Performers
- The Lord of the Rings: The Return of the King (2003): Stunt Performers
- Pirates of the Caribbean: The Curse of the Black Pearl (2003): Stunts
- The Chronicles of Narnia: The Lion, the Witch and the Wardrobe (2005): Stunts
- Pirates of the Caribbean: Dead Man's Chest (2006): Stunt Native
- Epic Movie (2007): Stunts
- Deadliest Warrior (2009): Weapons Demonstration
- The A-Team (2010): Stunts

=== Miscellaneous crew ===
- The Last Samurai (2003): Location Manager: Split Unit
- The Long and Short of It (2003): Traffic Controller/Grip
- Deadliest Warrior: Shaolin Monk vs Māori Warrior (TV) (2009): Himself, demonstrating Māori weapons

== Awards and nominations ==
Year	Award	Category	Film	Result
2001	Phoenix Film Critics Society Award	Best Cast; Shared with Sean Astin, Sean Bean, Cate Blanchett, Orlando Bloom, Billy Boyd, Marton Csokas, Ian Holm, Christopher Lee, Lawrence Makoare, Ian McKellen, Dominic Monaghan, Viggo Mortensen, John Rhys-Davies, Martyn Sanderson, Liv Tyler, David Weatherley, Hugo Weaving, Elijah Wood	The Lord of the Rings: The Fellowship of the Ring	Won
2002	Phoenix Film Critics Society Award	Best Cast; Shared with Sean Astin, John Bach, Cate Blanchett, Orlando Bloom, Billy Boyd, Brad Dourif, Bernard Hill, Bruce Hopkins, Christopher Lee, John Leigh, Ian McKellen, Dominic Monaghan, Viggo Mortensen, Miranda Otto, Craig Parker, John Rhys-Davies, Liv Tyler, Karl Urban, Hugo Weaving, David Wenham, Elijah Wood	The Lord of the Rings: The Two Towers	Won
2003	Phoenix Film Critics Society Award	Best Cast; Shared with Sean Astin, Sean Bean, Cate Blanchett, Orlando Bloom, Billy Boyd, Bernard Hill, Ian Holm, Ian McKellen, Dominic Monaghan, Viggo Mortensen, John Noble, Miranda Otto, John Rhys-Davies, Andy Serkis, Liv Tyler, Karl Urban, Hugo Weaving, David Wenham, Elijah Wood	The Lord of the Rings: The Return of the King	Nominated
2008	Taurus Award	Best Fight	The Kingdom	Nominated
2008	Screen Actors Guild Award	Outstanding Performance by a Stunt Ensemble in a Motion Picture	The Kingdom	Nominated
2010	Screen Actors Guild Award	Outstanding Performance by a Stunt Ensemble in a Motion Picture	Star Trek	Won
