= Braven =

- Theatrical release poster
- Directed by: Lin Oeding
- Screenplay by: Thomas Pa'a Sibbett
- Story by: Mike Nilon; Thomas Pa'a Sibbett
- Produced by: Jason Momoa; Brian Mendoza; Molly Hassell; Mike Nilon
- Starring: Jason Momoa; Garret Dillahunt; Jill Wagner; Stephen Lang
- Cinematography: Brian Andrew Mendoza
- Edited by: Rob Bonz
- Music by: Justin Small; Ohad Benchetrit
- Production companies: Saban Films; Pride of Gypsies; Highland Film Group; Ingenious Media
- Distributed by: Lionsgate
- Release date: February 2, 2018 (United States)
- Running time: 94 minutes
- Countries: Canada; United States
- Language: English
- Box office: $854,319

Braven is a 2018 action thriller film directed by Lin Oeding and written by Mike Nilon and Thomas Pa'a Sibbett. The film stars Jason Momoa as Joe Braven, with Garret Dillahunt, Stephen Lang, Jill Wagner, and Brendan Fletcher. Principal photography began in December 2015 in Newfoundland, Canada. Scenes for this film were also shot and included from Springhill, Nova Scotia. The film was released on February 2, 2018.

== Plot ==
Logging company owner and family man Joe Braven lives with his wife Stephanie, daughter Charlotte, and his father Linden. Linden, who has dementia due to a previous head injury, gets into a bar room brawl, ending up in the hospital. When the doctor recommends a more supervised approach for Linden, Stephanie suggests Joe take Linden to the family's secluded mountain cabin to talk about the situation.

While transporting logs and drugs by truck, Joe's co-worker, Weston, and Hallett, a drug trafficker, get into an accident and store the cocaine in Joe's mountain cabin. They take refuge at a motel, where Hallett relays the news to his employer, drug lord Kassen.

Upon their arrival at the cabin, Joe discovers the cocaine in the shed. He hides Charlotte, who tagged along, in a storage closet before they are surrounded by Kassen's mercenaries. Kassen kills Weston in front of Joe. Unable to call for help with the lack of cell service, Joe and Linden arm themselves and kill one of the mercenaries.

Needing higher ground to access a cellular network, Joe causes a distraction and drives away on a quad bike with Charlotte. He instructs her to climb to the mountain, where she calls her mother, who in turn calls the sheriff. Another mercenary attacks Joe but he drives the quad off a cliff into the sea, killing the mercenary and almost dying himself. Hallett enters the cabin and is stabbed with a skewer by Linden, killing him.

A bow-wielding Stephanie saves Charlotte from a mercenary. Joe returns to the cabin, where he kills two more men. Charlotte is picked up by the sheriff as Stephanie is pursued in the woods. Kassen takes Linden hostage and fatally stabs him in front of Joe. He escapes with the lost cocaine but Joe chases after him. He helps Stephanie kill her pursuer before engaging in a violent knife fight with Kassen on the cliff. He pushes Kassen off the edge, killing him, before being reunited with his family.

== Cast ==
- Jason Momoa as Joe Braven, a soft spoken logger and family man, the protagonist of the film
- Garret Dillahunt as Kassen, the main antagonist of the film and the leader of the drug traffickers.
- Stephen Lang as Linden Braven, Joe's father
- Jill Wagner as Stephanie Braven, Joe's wife
- Sasha Rossof as Charlotte Braven, Joe's daughter
- Glenn Ennis as Ridley, a mercenary and the second antagonist of the film.
- Teach Grant as Essington, third antagonist; a mercenary working with Kassen
- Zahn McClarnon as Hallett, a drug trafficker, who is Kassen's right hand man.
- Fraser Aitcheson as Clay, a mercenary working for Kassen
- Sala Baker as Gentry, a mercenary working for Kassen
- Todd Scott as Luisi, a mercenary working for Kassen
- Brendan Fletcher as Weston, Joe's co-worker
- James Harvey Ward as Randal
- Steve O'Connell as Sheriff Cal Osser, supporting character helping the Braven family
- Tye Alexander as Deputy Glen Harris, Sheriff Cal Osser’s assistant
- Steve Cochrane as Doctor Edwards
- Kevin Lewis as Bartender, the Bartender of the bar Linden goes inside of at the beginning
- Monica Walsh as Waitress

== Production ==
September 3, 2015, it was announced that Jason Momoa would star in the action thriller film Braven to be directed by Lin Oeding, based on the story by Mike Nilon and scripted by Thomas Pa'a Sibbett. Momoa would produce the film along with his partner Brian Mendoza through their Pride of Gypsies banner, along with Nilon and Molly Hassell. On December 14, 2015, Garret Dillahunt joined the film to play the villainous role.

Principal photography on the film began early-December 2015 in Newfoundland, Canada.

== Reception ==
On review aggregator website Rotten Tomatoes, the film has an approval rating of 77% based on 31 reviews, and an average rating of 5.9/10. On Metacritic, the film has a weighted average score of 61 out of 100, based on 10 critics, indicating "generally favorable" reviews.
