= Jane Lang =

American lawyer

- Known for: Lawyer, philanthropist
- Father: Eugene Lang
- Relatives: Stephen Lang (brother); Lucy Lang (niece)

Jane Lang is an American lawyer, arts philanthropist, and advocate for arts education. She has been characterized as a neighborhood activist, the primary force responsible for revitalizing a run-down area of Washington, D.C. She is the daughter of entrepreneur and philanthropist Eugene Lang, and the older sister of actor Stephen Lang.

She also co-founded the law firm Sprenger + Lang. In her legal career, Lang has specialized in employment litigation and housing law. In several notable cases, Lang settled class-action lawsuits against employers for sexual harassment, race discrimination, and other similar broad-reaching cases.

At Sprenger + Lang she has represented plaintiffs in employment discrimination cases, including race discrimination class actions that were settled against the Pillsbury Co. and Northwest Airlines, with consent decrees in 1990 and 1991. She was lead counsel with Paul Sprenger in In re Pepco Employment Litigation and numerous other cases litigated during the first half of the 1990s. She was instrumental in negotiating settlements in several of Sprenger + Lang's cases, including cases against Maytag and Control Data Corp.

== Education ==
- Swarthmore College, 1967. (Phi Beta Kappa)
- University of Pennsylvania Law School, J.D., 1970. (Member of the Law Review)

== Legal career ==
From 1970 until 1979, Lang practiced law with the Washington D.C. law firm of Steptoe & Johnson, becoming its first female partner in 1977. From 1979 to 1981, she served as General Counsel for the United States Department of Housing and Urban Development. After that, she returned to her former law firm Steptoe & Johnson.

In 1986, after leaving Steptoe & Johnson, Lang founded her own firm, developing a plaintiffs' practice. Shortly thereafter she met Paul Sprenger when they were on opposites sides of a case involving black employees of the Burlington Northern Railroad. He represented the workers, she the railroad, and they negotiated a settlement. They merged their practices in 1989, forming the firm Sprenger & Lang, with offices in Washington and Minneapolis, and married the next year. Sprenger + Lang achieved landmark victories on behalf of women and minorities, including a race and gender discrimination case against Pepco, the leading sexual harassment case of Jenson v. Eveleth Taconite Company (which was the basis of a 2002 book, “Class Action,” by Clara Bingham and Laura Leedy Gansler, and of a 2005 film, “North Country,” in which Woody Harrelson played a lawyer based on Mr. Sprenger and Charlize Theron played a character based on Ms. Jenson), and served as lead counsel representing television writers in a $74.5 million settlement against the television production industry, the largest settlement in the history of age-discrimination litigation. Sprenger + Lang was purchased by Sprenger's son Steven and has since closed.

== Philanthropy ==
Lang served as the first Chairman of the Board of Directors and President of the Atlas Performing Arts Center, in Washington, D.C. She is identified by the organization as Founder and Chair Emeritus. The historic Atlas Theatre in northeast Washington was renovated and reopened as a multiple-use performing arts center. The non-profit arts center has played a significant role in the revitalization of what is now called the "Atlas District" in Washington.

Lang is a trustee of the Eugene M. Lang Foundation, a New York-based 501(c)(3) private foundation. In its 2023 Form 990-PF data, ProPublica reported the foundation had total assets of $30.5 million, expenses of $4.28 million, and charitable disbursements of $4.14 million.

== Honors ==
Paul Sprenger and Jane Lang were included in Washingtonian magazine's 2007 list of Washingtonians of the year.
