= Jill Wagner =

American actress (born 1979)

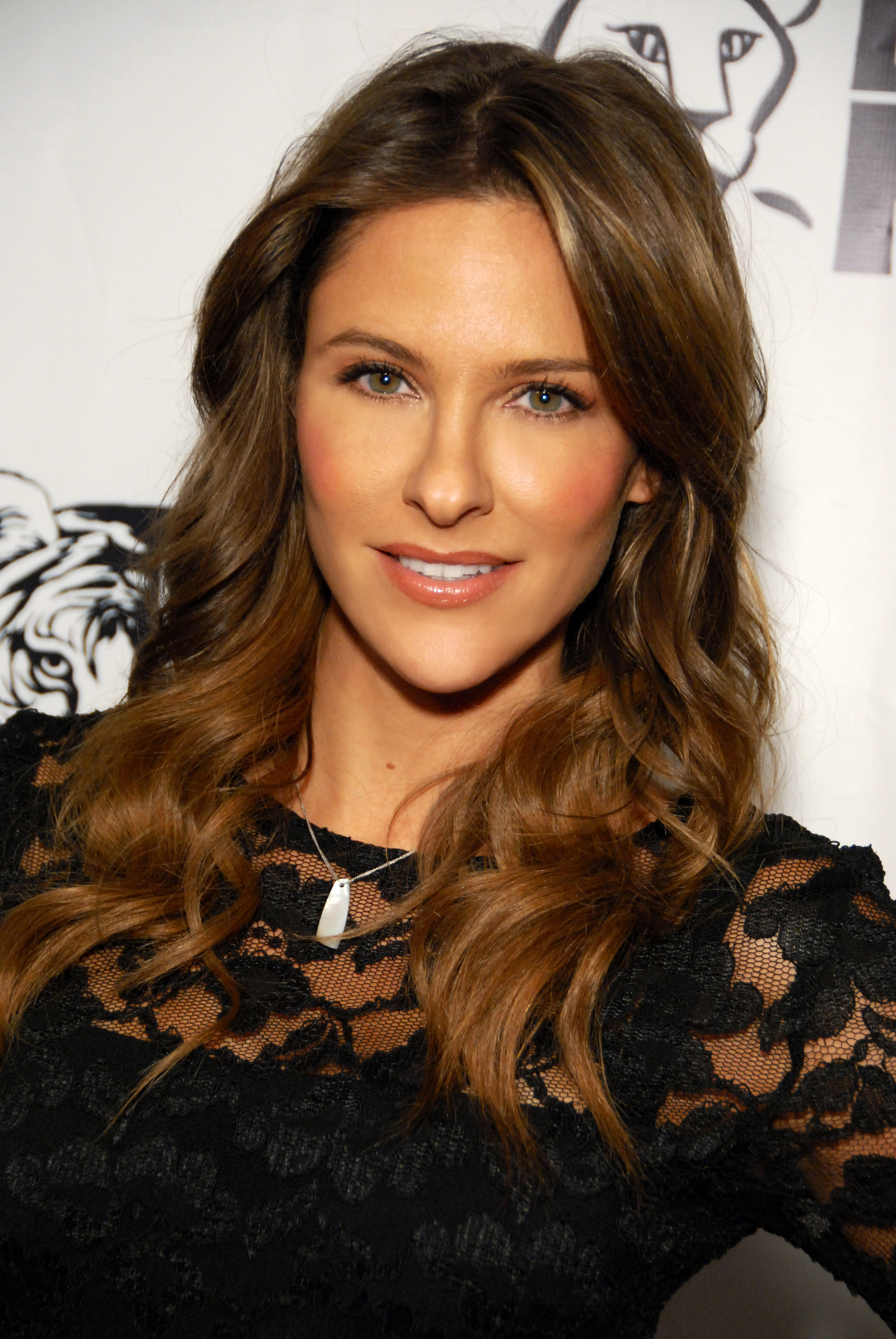
- Wagner in 2012
- Born: Jill Suzanne Wagner; January 13, 1979 (age 47); Winston-Salem, North Carolina, U.S.
- Education: North Carolina State University
- Occupations: Actress; television personality
- Years active: 2003–present
- Spouse: David Lemanowicz (m. 2017)
- Children: 2

Jill Suzanne Wagner (born January 13, 1979) is an American actress and television personality. She was the on-field host for the ABC game show Wipeout from 2008 to 2011 and again from 2013 to 2014, briefly leaving during the fifth season in 2012. Since then, Wagner has starred in several made-for-television films for the Hallmark Channel, Hallmark Movies & Mysteries, and Great American Family. She stars as Bobby in the Paramount+ spy series Lioness (2023–present).

== Early life and education ==
Wagner was born in Winston-Salem, North Carolina. She was raised primarily by her father, David Wagner, a U.S. Marine, and her grandmother. She attended Ledford Senior High School in Wallburg, North Carolina. She went to North Carolina State University, graduating in 2001 with a bachelor's degree in business management. During her teens, she trained at Barbizon Modeling and Acting School in Raleigh.

== Career ==
After college, Wagner moved to California to pursue a career in entertainment. In 2003, she was selected as a cast member on the MTV series Punk'd, participating in several sketches. The following year, Wagner was ranked number 90 on the Maxim Hot 100 Women of 2004. She was featured in the July 2006 issue of American FHM magazine.

In 2006, she co-starred in the Spike TV television series Blade: The Series as Krista Starr. She was a co-host of Inside the Vault on WGN America. Wagner has also had guest roles on a variety of television series, including Quintuplets and Bones. Her theatrical roles include Junebug (2005) and the horror film Splinter in 2008.

In March 2008, Wagner was announced as the on-field host for the ABC game show Wipeout, which premiered June 24, 2008. In April 2011, Wagner announced that she was leaving Wipeout after four seasons to focus on her acting career; she was succeeded by Vanessa Minnillo for the series' fifth season. In late August 2012, it was announced that Wagner would return as the co-host of Wipeout for its sixth season, a role she continued throughout the rest of the series' run. A fan favorite during the show's run, Wagner explained that it was difficult to "keep a straight face" while co-hosting on Wipeout, remarking: "I challenge anyone to come down and do my job and keep a straight face. It’s absolutely impossible." Wagner was the featured spokesmodel for the 2006-2011 Mercury Milan.

In June 2011, Wagner appeared on the series Teen Wolf airing on MTV. In 2013, Wagner appeared on Rhett and Link's third episode of their YouTube series The Mythical Show; this was in response to an episode of their talk show Good Mythical Morning, where they mentioned they had gone to college with a girl who had caught their interest, but never had the courage to talk to, who was revealed to be Wagner.

In 2015, Wagner was tapped to host the original series Handcrafted America on INSP; the series began its third season in August 2017. Wagner appeared in the Canadian film Braven (2018).

Since 2015, she has appeared in Hallmark Channel made-for-television films, including playing Amy Winslow on the Mystery 101 movie series on the Hallmark Movies & Mysteries Channel in 2019. Since December 2021, Wagner has appeared in Great American Family made-for-television films, including A Merry Christmas Wish, which premiered in December 2022.

Since 2023, Wagner has appeared as a main cast member, playing CIA operative Bobby, of Taylor Sheridan's Special Ops: Lioness series.

== Personal life ==
In April 2017, Wagner married Canadian former minor league (AHL and CHL) ice hockey player and U.S. Army Reserve officer David Lemanowicz, after they had announced their engagement earlier in 2016. In April 2020, Wagner gave birth to a daughter. A second daughter was born in August 2021. Wagner lives on a farm in Tennessee with Lemanowicz and their two daughters. In 2023, Wagner noted that she believes in God, though she did not publicly disclose a religious tradition.

== Filmography ==
=== Film ===
Year	Title	Role	Notes
2005	Junebug	Millicent, Friend At Shower	
2006	Shifted	Rachel	
2008	Splinter	Polly Watt	
2014	Road to Paloma	Sandy	
2016	Super Novas	Judy	
2018	Braven	Stephanie Braven	

=== Television ===
Year	Title	Role	Notes
2003	Punk'd	Field Agent	6 episodes
2004	Monk	Crystal Smith	Episode: "Mr. Monk and the Employee of the Month"
2004	Dr. Vegas	Roxanne	Episodes: "Dead Man, Live Bet", "All In"
2004	Quintuplets	Cammie	Episode: "Thanksgiving Day Charade"
2006	Blade: The Series	Krista Starr	Main role
2007–2008	Stargate Atlantis	Larrin	Episodes: "Travelers", "Be All My Sins Remember'd"
2008	Bones	Holly Markwell	Episode: "The Man in the Outhouse"
2008–2011, 2013–2014	Wipeout	Herself	Co-host (seasons 1–4, 6–7)
2009	Dancing with the Stars	Herself	Episode: "Round Ten: Final Results"
2011	Inside the Vault	Herself	Co-host
2011, 2014, 2017	Teen Wolf	Kate Argent	Recurring role (seasons 1, 4); guest role (seasons 3, 6); 20 episodes
2015	Autumn Dreams	Annie Hancock	Television film
2015	Christmas in the Smokies	Trish Greene	Television film
2015–2017	Handcrafted America	Herself	Host
2016	Christmas Cookies	Hannah Harper	Television film
2017	A Harvest Wedding	Sarah Bloom	Television film
2017	Karen Kingsbury's Maggie's Christmas Miracle	Maggie Wright	Television film
2017	Hell's Kitchen	Herself	Guest diner and Shane's Inspiration contributor; episode: "It's All Gravy"
2018	Pearl In Paradise	Alex Anderson	Television film
2018	Christmas in Evergreen: Letters to Santa	Lisa	Television film
2019	Mystery 101	Amy Winslow	Television film
2019	Mystery 101: Playing Dead	Amy Winslow	Television film
2019	Mystery 101: Words Can Kill	Amy Winslow	Television film
2019	Mystery 101: Dead Talk	Amy Winslow	Television film
2019	Christmas Wishes & Mistletoe Kisses	Abbey	Television film
2019	Christmas in Evergreen: Tidings of Joy	Lisa	Television film
2019	The Legend of 5 Mile Cave	Susan Tilwicky	Television film
2020	Hearts of Winter	Bethany	Television film
2020	Mystery 101: An Education in Murder	Amy Winslow	Television film
2020	The Angel Tree	Rebecca McBride	Television film
2021	Mystery 101: Killer Timing	Amy Winslow	Television film
2021	Mystery 101: Deadly History	Amy Winslow	Television film
2021	A Christmas Miracle for Daisy	Whitney Alder	Television film
2022	A Merry Christmas Wish	Janie Collins	Television film
2023–present	Lioness	Bobby	Main role; also executive producer
2023	Bringing Christmas Home	Caroline Upton	Television film
2024	Christmas Under the Northern Lights	Erin	Television film
2024–present	Homestead: The Series	Jacq Reynolds	6 episodes
2025	Christmas at the Inn	Beth	Television film
