= Talhotblond (2012 film) =

2012 television film by Courteney Cox

- Directed by: Courteney Cox
- Starring: Garret Dillahunt; Brando Eaton
- Country of origin: United States
- Original language: English

Production
- Running time: 87 minutes
- Production companies: Lasky Productions; Motion Picture Corporation of America; Silver Screen Pictures; Sony Pictures Television

Original release
- Network: Lifetime
- Release: June 23, 2012

Talhotblond is a 2012 American television film directed by Courteney Cox. It is based on an Internet love triangle that resulted in a real-life murder. It is based on the 2009 Barbara Schroeder documentary of the same name.

== Cast ==
- Garret Dillahunt as Thomas Montgomery
- Brando Eaton as Brian
- Laura San Giacomo as Carol Montgomery
- Molly Hagan as Beth Brooks
- Taylor Geare as Amy Montgomery
- Jaden Gould as Stacey Montgomery
- Ashley Hinshaw as Katie Brooks

== See also ==
- Talhotblond (2009 film), documentary about the same subject.
