= Lin Oeding =

American film director

- Born: August 9, 1977 (age 48); Sacramento, California, U.S.
- Occupation(s): Film director, stunt coordinator

Lin Oeding (born August 9, 1977) is an American film director and stunt coordinator.

== Early life ==
Oeding was born to a German/Dutch father and a Taiwanese mother. He then grew up in Houston, Texas and graduated in May of 2001 from the University of Texas at Austin, receiving his BFA in screenwriting and film directing.

He has a background in mixed martial arts and gymnastics, having trained in Karate, Tae Kwon Do and Kung Fu since his childhood. He began his MMA training at the age of 17 in Muay Thai, Brazilian Jiu-Jitsu, and Wrestling. In the fighting circuit, after 19 fights, Lin holds a 16-2-1 record..

At one point, he competed professionally on pay-per-view, in Bare-Knuckled fighting events.

== Career ==
As a result of his background in mixed martial arts and gymnastics, Lin got his early break in 1993, working with Chuck Norris on the television series, Walker, Texas Ranger. Over the next decade, Lin had the opportunity to study under many of the best directors in the business on projects such as The Last Samurai, Inception, Star Trek and over 100+ other movie and tv shows.

A veteran stunt coordinator and performer, Oeding second unit directed and stunt coordinated in films such as Straight Outta Compton, The Equalizer, and Olympus Has Fallen. While stunt coordinating Straight Outta Compton, Lin's pre-viz caught the eye of director F. Gary Gray, and he was asked to direct 2nd unit for the Ferrari chase sequence as well as the opening crack house breach. Lin followed up "Straight Outta Compton" with his own short film, Lifted (starring Joel Edgerton).

As a result of Lifted and his prior shorts, Lin's career took off in both features and television. He has been directing television since 2015, including the reboot of Magnum P.I.. Lin made his feature directorial debut with the action-thriller Braven starring Jason Momoa, and Stephen Lang. The movie released in 2018 to positive reviews from critics including: The Hollywood Reporter, Variety, LA Times, and NY Post. His background in both theater directing, and stunt coordination was noted by the critics in his sharp camera aesthetic, fluid action blocking, and effective storytelling.

His credits as stunt performer include Pirates of the Caribbean: Dead Man's Chest, Star Trek – where he was stunt double for actor John Cho, Inception, and Ant-Man.

== Filmography ==
=== Film ===
Short film director

- Interpretation (2008) (Also writer and producer)
- Wake (2012)
- Lifted (2015)

Feature film director

- Braven (2018)
- Office Uprising (2018)

Acting roles

Year	Title	Role	Notes
1999	Arlington Road	College student	Uncredited
1999	Killing the Badge	Officer Nguyen	
2001	Pearl Harbor	Japanese soldier	Uncredited
2002	Triple Threat	Bobby	Short film
2005	Irish American Ninja	Bad Guy Under Bridge	Video
2009	Blood and Bone	Thug	
2012	Safe	Quan Chang henchman	Uncredited
2012	Bullet to the Head	Lee	

=== Television ===
Director

Year	Title	Notes
2015-2017	Chicago P.D.	3 episodes
2017	Blood Drive	2 episodes
2017	Blindspot	1 episode
2018	Chicago Fire	1 episode
2018	Code Black	1 episode
2018	Colony	1 episode
2018-2019	Chicago Med	2 episodes
2018-2022	Magnum P.I.	2 episodes
2019	The Blacklist	1 episode
2019	Warrior	2 episodes
2019	S.W.A.T.	1 episode
2021	Cobra Kai	2 episodes
2022	Reacher	1 episode
2022	NCIS: Hawai'i	1 episode
2022	CSI: Vegas	1 episode

Acting roles

Year	Title	Role	Notes
2008	Prison Break	Feng's Man #1	1 episode
2014	True Blood	Yakuza #8	4 episodes, Uncredited
2014	Newsreaders	Chinese Police Officer #2	1 episode

== Trivia ==
- In 1989, Oeding was a semi-finalist at the Nintendo World Championship, and was considered one of the best Tetris players in the country.
- He has performed on-screen fight scenes with Jet Li, Chuck Norris, Tom Cruise, Leonardo DiCaprio, Christian Bale (Batman), Ben Affleck (Batman), Dwayne 'The Rock' Johnson, Vin Diesel, Steven Seagal, Jason Statham, Seth Rogen, Anne Hathaway, Ice-T, Jennifer Garner, Jason Momoa, Eliza Dushku, Ken Watanabe, Kurt Angle and many others.
