= Cris Collinsworth =

American sports broadcaster (born 1959)

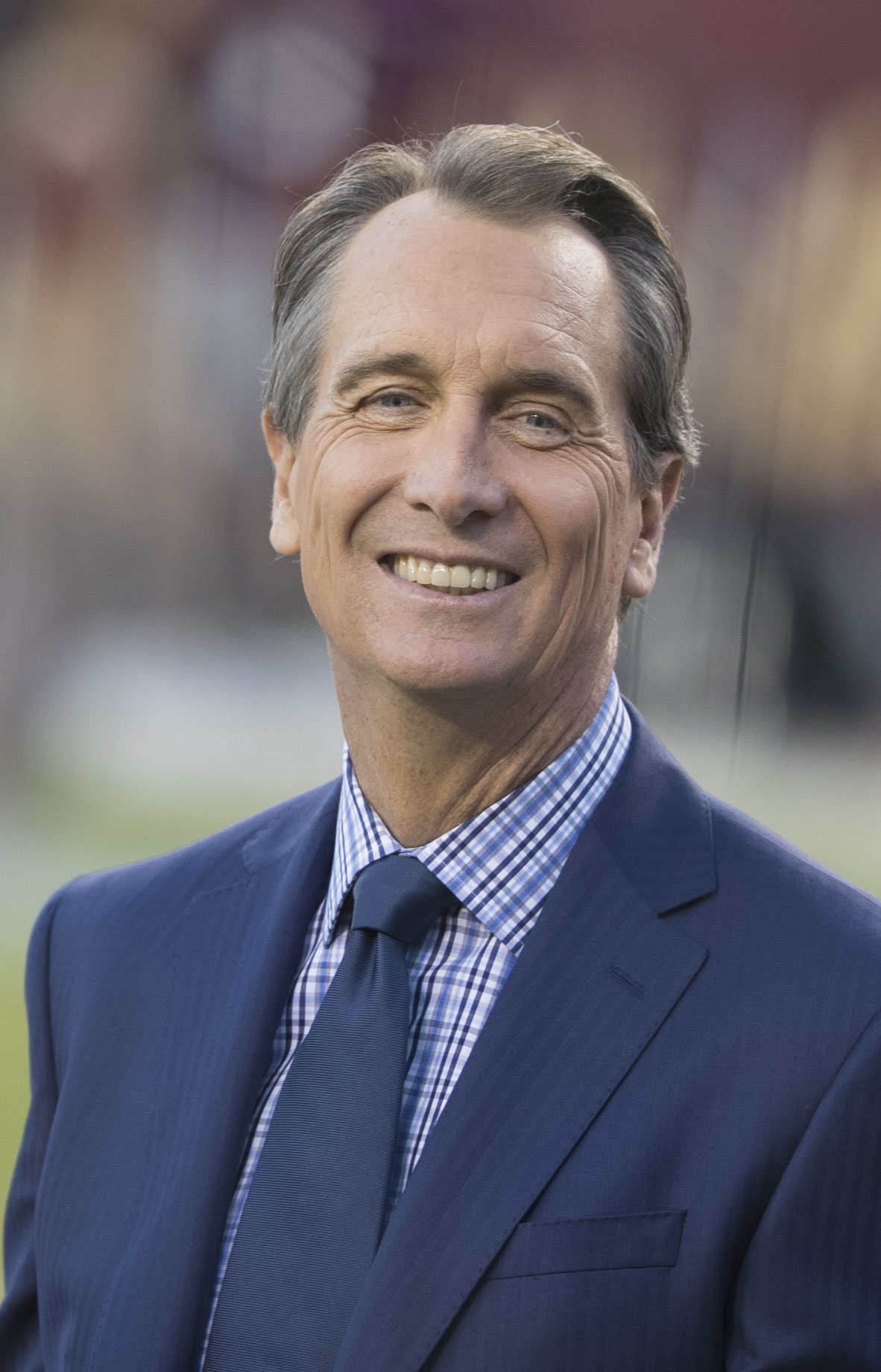
- Collinsworth in 2017

No. 80
- Position: Wide receiver

Personal information
- Born: January 27, 1959 (age 67); Dayton, Ohio, U.S.
- Listed height: 6 ft 5 in (1.96 m)
- Listed weight: 192 lb (87 kg)

Career information
- High school: Astronaut (Titusville, Florida)
- College: Florida (1977–1981)
- NFL draft: 1981: 2nd round, 37th overall pick

Career history
- Cincinnati Bengals (1981–1988)

Awards and highlights
- 3× Second-team All-Pro (1981−1983); 3× Pro Bowl (1981–1983); PFWA NFL All-Rookie Team (1981); Cincinnati Bengals 50th Anniversary Team; First-team All-American (1980); 3× First-team All-SEC (1978–1980); University of Florida Athletic Hall of Fame

Career NFL statistics
- Receptions: 417
- Receiving yards: 6,698
- Yards per reception: 16.1
- Receiving touchdowns: 36
- Stats at Pro Football Reference

Anthony Cris Collinsworth (born January 27, 1959) is an American former professional football player and sports broadcaster who was a wide receiver in the National Football League (NFL) for eight seasons (1981–1988) with the Cincinnati Bengals. He played college football for the Florida Gators, earning first-team All-American honors. He is a television sportscaster for NBC, Showtime, and the NFL Network, and winner of 17 Sports Emmy Awards. He is also the majority owner of Pro Football Focus.

== Early life ==
Collinsworth was born in Dayton, Ohio, the son of Abraham Lincoln "Abe" Collinsworth and Donetta Browning Collinsworth. Abe, known as "Lincoln" in high school, was one of the top scorers in Kentucky high-school basketball history, and played for the Kentucky Wildcats "Fiddling Five" who won the 1958 national championship. Both of his parents were educators; Donetta was a teacher, and Abe was a high-school teacher and coach who later became a principal and eventually the superintendent of schools for Brevard County.

His family, including Cris and his younger brother Greg, moved from Ohio to Melbourne, Florida, in 1963, when Cris was four years old. They moved to nearby Titusville in 1972, where he and his brother attended Astronaut High School, while their father was the principal. He was successful in multiple sports for the Astronaut War Eagles, and during his junior year in 1976, he won the Florida High School Athletic Association (FHSAA) Class 3A 100-yard-dash state championship and was named a high-school All-American quarterback. In 1996, he was inducted into the National High School Hall of Fame.

== College career ==
Collinsworth's combination of height and speed attracted the attention of college football programs throughout the South, and he accepted an athletic scholarship from coach Doug Dickey to attend the University of Florida in Gainesville, Florida. Though he was recruited as a run-first quarterback for the Gators' option offense, Collinsworth threw a 99-yard touchdown pass to Derrick Gaffney against the Rice Owls in his first collegiate attempt, a toss which remains tied for the longest touchdown pass in NCAA history.

Florida's option attack struggled against top defenses in Collinsworth's freshman season of 1977, so Coach Dickey decided to transition his team from a run-oriented offense to a more balanced pro set attack for 1978. Collinsworth was moved to wide receiver, where his new position coach was former Gator quarterback Steve Spurrier in his first year as a coach. Though Florida's offense did not improve enough to save the jobs of Dickey or his coaching staff, Collinsworth flourished in his new role. He was named a first-team All-Southeastern Conference (SEC) selection in 1978, 1979 and 1980, and was named both a first-team All-American and a first-team Academic All-America in 1980. Collinsworth was a senior captain on the 1980 Gator team that posted the biggest one-year turnaround in NCAA Division I football history at the time, improving to 8–4 after posting a 0–10–1 record in 1979, Charlie Pell's first season as Florida's head coach. Collinsworth finished his collegiate career by being named the MVP of the 1980 Tangerine Bowl.

During his career at Florida, Collinsworth caught 120 passes for 1,937 yards, and rushed for another 210. He scored 14 touchdowns receiving, two rushing, one on a kickoff return, and threw two touchdown passes. He also returned 30 kickoffs for 726 yards for an average of 24.2 yards per return. He graduated with a bachelor's degree in accounting in 1981 and was inducted into the University of Florida Student Hall of Fame the same year. He was inducted into the University of Florida Athletic Hall of Fame as a "Gator Great" in 1991, and as part of a recognition of 100 years of Florida football in 2006, The Gainesville Sun recognized him as the No. 12 all-time Gator player.

== Professional career ==
Collinsworth was selected by the Cincinnati Bengals in the second round (37th pick overall) of the 1981 NFL draft, and spent his entire eight-year NFL career with the Bengals. In his first season, Collinsworth was the team's leading receiver and set the Bengals franchise record for receptions by a rookie with 67, the most by an NFL rookie wide receiver in 21 years. He surpassed 1,000 yards receiving four times (in 1981, 1983, 1985, and 1986) and was named to the Pro Bowl in 1981, 1982 and 1983. At 6 ft 5 in (1.96 m) in height, Collinsworth often created mismatches against much smaller cornerbacks. In addition to his height advantage, he was a legitimate deep threat due to his speed.

In Super Bowl XVI, Collinsworth was the game's leading receiver with five receptions for 107 yards, but committed a costly second quarter fumble when he was hit by San Francisco defensive back Eric Wright. The fumble was immediately followed by a 92-yard 49ers touchdown drive, and San Francisco won 26–21.

In 1985, Collinsworth signed with the Tampa Bay Bandits of the United States Football League (USFL), but the contract was voided when he failed the physical due to a bad ankle. He returned to the Bengals and played for them through the end of the 1988 season, catching three passes for 40 yards in Super Bowl XXIII, the final game of his career. He finished his eight-season NFL career with 417 receptions for 6,698 yards and 36 touchdowns in 107 games.

== Broadcasting career ==
After his retirement as an NFL player, Collinsworth began a broadcasting career as a sports radio talk show host on Cincinnati station WLW. Initially, he was a guest host for Bob Trumpy (also a Bengals alumnus), but took over the show full-time as Trumpy accepted more television assignments. He then became a reporter for HBO's (now Showtime's) Inside the NFL in 1989.

In 1990, he became a part of NBC's NFL broadcasts, as well as some of the college programming. He joined the NBC pregame show in 1996.

In 1995, he appeared on HBO broadcasting at Wimbledon with Billie Jean King, Martina Navratilova, and Barry MacKay.

In 1998, Collinsworth joined the NFL on Fox team after NBC lost their broadcast rights to CBS. After several years as a color commentator on the Fox NFL Sunday pregame show, Collinsworth was assigned to Fox's lead game broadcasting crew (teaming with Joe Buck and Troy Aikman) in 2002. He worked on Fox's Super Bowl XXXIX telecast three years later. Collinsworth was also the host of the television show Guinness World Records Primetime during his stay at Fox.

In 2006, Collinsworth could be seen on three networks during football season. In addition to co-hosting Inside the NFL on HBO, he returned to NBC as a studio analyst for that network's Sunday night NFL coverage and did color commentary on the NFL Network. He also served as color commentator for NFL Network Thursday night games (and one Saturday-night game) alongside play-by-play man Bryant Gumbel and Bob Papa.

In the NBC broadcasts of the 2008 Summer Olympics in Beijing, Collinsworth appeared alongside Bob Costas as a commentator on numerous occasions. Collinsworth and Costas paired again during the 2010 Winter Olympics in Vancouver, Canada. He also continued his work on Inside the NFL when it debuted on its new home on Showtime.

Collinsworth is also the color commentator on Madden NFL 09 and Madden NFL 10 with Tom Hammond, as well as in Madden NFL 11 and Madden NFL 12 with Gus Johnson.

In 2009, Collinsworth filled the color-commentator role vacated by John Madden on NBC's Sunday Night Football, with Al Michaels. As of 2026, he is in his seventeenth season of the high-profile telecast, paired with Mike Tirico, after Michaels was named the new play-by-play announcer for Prime Video's coverage of Thursday Night Football in 2022.

Collinsworth was the host of Inside the Vault on WGN America.

Collinsworth is on the Board of Selectors of Jefferson Awards for Public Service.

One of the most well-known trademarks of Collinsworth's work in the broadcasting booth was his performance of the "Collinsworth Slide" before each game. After Al Michaels gave a brief introduction for the upcoming game, the camera would pan out slightly and allow Collinsworth to slide himself into the picture via his broadcasting chair, after which he provided insights of his own. He has also been noted for his affinity for Patrick Mahomes. Collinsworth was sometimes cited by a few fans as among the worst commentators in the league, though Awful Announcing's ratings of 2026 NFL announcers ranked him as the third best.

== NFL career statistics ==
=== Regular season ===
Year	Team	Games		Receiving					Rushing					Fumbles	
Year	Team	GP	GS	Rec	Yds	Avg	Lng	TD	Att	Yds	Avg	Lng	TD	Fum	Lost
1981	CIN	16	16	67	1,009	15.1	74	8	–	–	–	–	–	3	2
1982	CIN	9	9	49	700	14.3	50	1	1	–11	–11.0	–11	0	1	1
1983	CIN	14	14	66	1,130	17.1	63	5	2	2	1.0	8	0	2	1
1984	CIN	15	14	64	989	15.5	57	6	1	7	7.0	7	0	0	0
1985	CIN	16	16	65	1,125	17.3	71	5	1	3	3.0	3	0	1	1
1986	CIN	16	15	62	1,024	16.5	46	10	2	–16	–8.0	–6	0	1	1
1987	CIN	8	6	31	494	15.9	53	0	–	–	–	–	–	0	0
1988	CIN	13	0	13	227	17.5	36	1	–	–	–	–	–	1	1
Career		107	90	417	6,698	16.1	74	36	7	–15	–2.1	8	0	9	7

=== Postseason ===
Year	Team	Games		Receiving					Rushing					Fumbles	
Year	Team	GP	GS	Rec	Yds	Avg	Lng	TD	Att	Yds	Avg	Lng	TD	Fum	Lost
1981	CIN	3	3	9	159	17.7	49	1	1	2	2.0	2	0	2	1
1982	CIN	1	1	7	120	17.1	53	0	–	–	–	–	–	0	0
1988	CIN	3	0	5	75	15.0	30	0	–	–	–	–	–	0	0
Career		7	4	21	354	16.9	53	1	1	2	2.0	2	0	2	1

== Awards and honors ==
Football

- 1980 First-team All-American
- Three-time Second-team All-Pro
- Three-time Pro Bowl selection
- Academic All-America Hall of Fame inductee (class of 2001)
- University of Florida Athletic Hall of Fame inductee

Broadcasting

- 17-time Sports Emmy Award winner (eight for Studio Analyst and nine for Field Analyst)
- In 2023, he was inducted into the Sports Broadcasting Hall of Fame

== Personal life ==
Collinsworth received a juris doctor degree from the University of Cincinnati College of Law in 1991. He lives in Fort Thomas, Kentucky, with his wife, Holly (Bankemper) Collinsworth, an attorney, and their four children. His son, Austin Collinsworth, is a former football player at the University of Notre Dame. Another son, Jac, also attended Notre Dame and was a featured reporter for ESPN's Sunday NFL Countdown before joining his father at NBC, where he is the on-site host for Football Night in America and also hosts NBC's Notre Dame football, NASCAR, and coverage for other big events such as the Indianapolis 500 and Kentucky Derby.

Collinsworth came under criticism after a 1984 interview emerged when he alluded to inappropriate sexual relationships with underage individuals saying "I like girls that aren't too bright because you can trick them a little bit...High school girls love me, 14-18 I'm a big star with them because you know, as soon as they mature they start figuring out wait a minute, I know I can get a better guy than that."

On March 12, 2011, Collinsworth reportedly was among 83 people rescued from Jeff Ruby's Waterfront restaurant in Covington, Kentucky, when the floating restaurant tore loose from its moorings and began to drift on the Ohio River, only to be stopped by the Brent Spence Bridge that links Ohio to Kentucky. Collinsworth also has a steak named after him by the same restaurant.

== See also ==
- 1980 College Football All-America Team
- History of the Cincinnati Bengals
- List of Alpha Tau Omega brothers
- List of Florida Gators football All-Americans
- List of Florida Gators in the NFL draft
- List of University of Cincinnati people
- List of University of Florida alumni
- List of University of Florida Athletic Hall of Fame members
- Double Doink, a phrase made famous by Cris Collinsworth

Sporting positions
Preceded by John Madden	NFL on Fox lead game analyst (with Troy Aikman); 2002–2004	Succeeded by Troy Aikman
Preceded by John Madden	NBC Sunday Night Football game analyst 2009-present	Succeeded by incumbent
