= Mystery 101 =

American/Canadian TV film series (2019–2021)

- Genre: drama, mystery
- Created by: Robin Bernheim; Lee Goldberg
- Starring: Jill Wagner; Kristoffer Polaha; Robin Thomas
- Countries of origin: Canada; United States

Production
- Production locations: Vancouver, British Columbia, Canada

Original release
- Network: Hallmark Movies & Mysteries (United States); W Network (Canada)
- Release: January 27, 2019 – August 1, 2021

Mystery 101 is an American/Canadian series of mystery TV movies created by Robin Bernheim and Lee Goldberg. It stars Jill Wagner, Kristoffer Polaha and Robin Thomas. The series aired on the Hallmark Movies & Mysteries channel in the United States and on the W Network in Canada.

== Premise ==
Amy Winslow is a professor of English literature at Elmstead College, in the (fictional) small coastal town of Garrison, Washington. She specializes in mystery and crime fiction. In the first film, a case involving a student at Elmstead has Amy consulting for Travis Burke, a "big city" police detective who has recently moved to Garrison. Amy's widower father, Graham Winslow, is the author of a bestselling series of detective novels and often helps Amy when she's in a pinch. As crimes unfold in the area, Amy inserts herself into Burke's investigations, often against his wishes; the two develop an increasingly strong friendship, eventually moving to first kiss at the end of the sixth film. In the first three films, Burke is also assisted by Claire Tate, a rookie detective who is the daughter of Garrison's police chief. Amy's teaching assistant, Bud, often helps her on cases with research and other tasks.

== Main cast ==
- Jill Wagner as Amy Winslow, a college literature professor who holds a class on crime fiction
- Kristoffer Polaha as Travis Burke, a newly transferred police detective
- Robin Thomas as Graham Winslow, a famous author and Amy's father
- Preston Vanderslice as Bud, Amy's talented teaching assistant (installments 1–6)
- Derek Green as Chief Tate, police chief and Travis' boss (installments 1–2)
- Sarah Dugdale as Claire Tate, Chief Tate's daughter and a rookie detective (installments 1–4)

== Films ==
No.	Title	Directed by	Written by	Original release date
1	"Mystery 101"	Blair Hayes	Robin Bernheim & Lee Goldberg and John Christian Plummer, Story by Robin Bernheim & Lee Goldberg	January 27, 2019
Professor Amy Winslow's star student Lacey goes missing shortly after her boyfriend, Rex Hansford, a crusading campus newspaper reporter, is killed in a motorcycle accident. A suspicious Amy insists the police investigate but the newly appointed Detective at Garrison Police Department, Detective Travis Burke, is less than enthusiastic about Amy's eagerness to be involved in police work. After a rare genetically engineered plant goes missing from the University's Life Sciences Department, Amy's boss suddenly commits suicide, and Rex's accident is ruled as a murder, Detective Burke is forced to team up with Amy to investigate both cases. The two end up striking a friendship as they work together to solve the mystery.
2	"Mystery 101: Playing Dead"	Blair Hayes	John Christian Plummer	June 23, 2019
Amy is working as the dramaturge on a play when lead actress Bella Brightman's life is threatened by two accidents that occur in the theatre. As Travis and Amy look into these incidents, Bella suddenly dies of a heart attack leading Amy to suspect foul play. When Amy and Travis investigate, they discover that a series of burglaries in Garrison, including one that resulted in Claire being injured, may be linked to Bella's death.
3	"Mystery 101: Words Can Kill"	Andy Mikita	John Christian Plummer	September 15, 2019
Amy's University is hosting a book festival bringing together several clashing personalities including Graham Winslow's old editor, Betsy Crane, and his literary nemesis, fellow writer Rick Fitch, who dated Amy's late mother before Graham married her. But the Winslows are soon victims of strange happenings, from being stalked by a New York cop to Graham's tires being slashed to a man being murdered in front of Graham's house. When Betsy turns up murdered, Amy and Travis clash after he arrests her father. Amy begins to investigate her own suspects, including her father's new British editor Celia Bunton, on whom her father seems to have a mild crush. When Rick is murdered as well, Amy and Travis must work fast to uncover the culprit.
4	"Mystery 101: Dead Talk"	Winnifred Jong	Jim Biederman and John Christian Plummer, story by John Christian Plummer & Jim Biederman	September 22, 2019
Amy heads to Seattle to give a TEDTalk-style lecture hosted by her ex-boyfriend Tim Bishop, a brilliant professor of Psychology. When a fellow speaker and tech genius Mitchell McHale dies in a fall, Amy suspects foul play. Seattle Police Lt. Rachel Knox (Tegan Moss) turns out to be an old friend of Travis' from their police academy days, but Knox is quick to shut Amy out of the investigation. Amy and Travis investigate suspects including McHale's wife and best friend, who were having an affair, and even Tim Bishop himself. When McHale's lawyer, a defense attorney known for his last-minute luck in winning cases, is found to have been murdered just days before McHale was, Travis and Amy come closer to the truth.
5	"Mystery 101: An Education in Murder"	Michael Robison	John Christian Plummer	March 29, 2020
A young writer's research prompts the police to revisit a famous murder case that convicted Amy's former colleague at Elmstead, Mac McGinnis. Travis and Amy get a second chance at clearing the professor's name, but that becomes more difficult when the writer is murdered as well.
6	"Mystery 101: Killer Timing"	Fred Gerber	John Christian Plummer	March 21, 2021
An escaped serial killer whom Travis helped convict during his time in Chicago threatens Travis's life, making this the most dangerous case yet for him and Amy. The two team up with Travis' FBI agent ex-wife to find if the escapee is somehow responsible for a house explosion that nearly kills Travis, but that turns out to have a connection to an entirely different crime. After that crime is solved, Travis is shot at while talking to Amy in her home. Suspecting the serial killer is in town, Travis leaves to investigate, only to soon learn that Amy may have been the shooter's target.
7	"Mystery 101: Deadly History"	Stacey Harding	John Christian Plummer	August 1, 2021
Amy and Travis travel to upstate New York to investigate when Amy’s uncle Alistair (Graham's younger brother) goes missing, as does all his research on the “accidental” death 20 years ago of an heir to the local Kent family's fortune. After locating Alistair and solving the Kent family mystery, Amy and Travis finally profess their love for each other. However, in a flash-forward to 11 months later, Travis and his partner arrive on the scene of a murder. When asked if he knows the murder victim, Sam, Travis responds, "Yeah, he's Amy's fiancé."

== Production and filming ==
The films are shot in the Greater Vancouver metropolitan area in British Columbia, including Vancouver and Maple Ridge. Scenes at the fictional Elmstead College campus are shot in communities near Greater Vancouver, including Quest University in Squamish and University of the Fraser Valley in Abbotsford.

Co-lead Wagner posted in April 2022 regarding her concerns about Hallmark not talking with her about the series' status. Her concern was justified since the series was officially cancelled by the network a year later, in late April 2023.
