= Paul Sprenger =

American lawyer

- Born: September 8, 1940; Stillwater, Minnesota, U.S.
- Died: December 29, 2014 (aged 74); Curaçao
- Education: University of Michigan (BA, 1962); University of Michigan Law School (JD, 1965)
- Occupation: Lawyer

Paul C. Sprenger (September 8, 1940 – December 29, 2014) was an American attorney. Sprenger is best known as lead counsel of Jenson v. Eveleth Taconite Co., a discrimination case involving female iron miners in Minnesota.

== Early life and career ==
Earning a track scholarship to the University of Michigan, Sprenger was the first of his family to attend college. Sprenger received a B.A. from the University's School of Business Administration in 1962, and a J.D. from the University of Michigan Law School in 1965. From 1965 until 1977, Sprenger practiced law with the Minneapolis business/defense law firm of Johnson & Sands, becoming a partner in 1970.

== Class Action Practice ==
Finding himself unsatisfied with representing business clients, Sprenger began his own firm in 1977, with a primary focus on employment discrimination class actions. In 1989, Sprenger merged his firm with Jane Lang's firm based in Washington, D.C. to form Sprenger + Lang, PLLC.

In Minneapolis in August 1988, Sprenger filed Lois E. Jenson and Patricia S. Kosmach v. Eveleth Taconite Co. in U.S. District Court The case, known as Jenson v. Eveleth Taconite Co., became the first sexual harassment discrimination class action lawsuit in the U.S. A fictionalized account of the landmark case was made into a 2005 film, North Country, with Woody Harrelson portraying the lead attorney "Bill White," acting in the Paul Sprenger role.

Sprenger was lead counsel on a television writers' age discrimination lawsuit which began in 2000 and settled in 2010. The case involved claims of widespread age discrimination in the television production and talent agency industries. These claims have been pursued for years with help from other firms and organizations, such as AARP. The case was settled in 2010 for $74.5 Million - the largest-ever settlement in the history of age discrimination litigation.

Sprenger was the treasurer of the Tregaron Conservancy, an environmental non-profit organization that restores and maintains the Tregaron historic estate in Washington, D.C. Sprenger served on the board of directors of the Atlas Performing Arts Center and served as the Treasurer of the organization. Sprenger was a Trustee of the Sprenger Lang Foundation, a non-profit organization promoting arts and arts education. Paul Sprenger and Jane Lang were included in Washingtonian magazine's 2007 list of Washingtonians of the year.

On December 29, 2014, Spenger died of an apparent heart attack while snorkeling in Curaçao.
