= Stephen Lang =

American actor (born 1952)

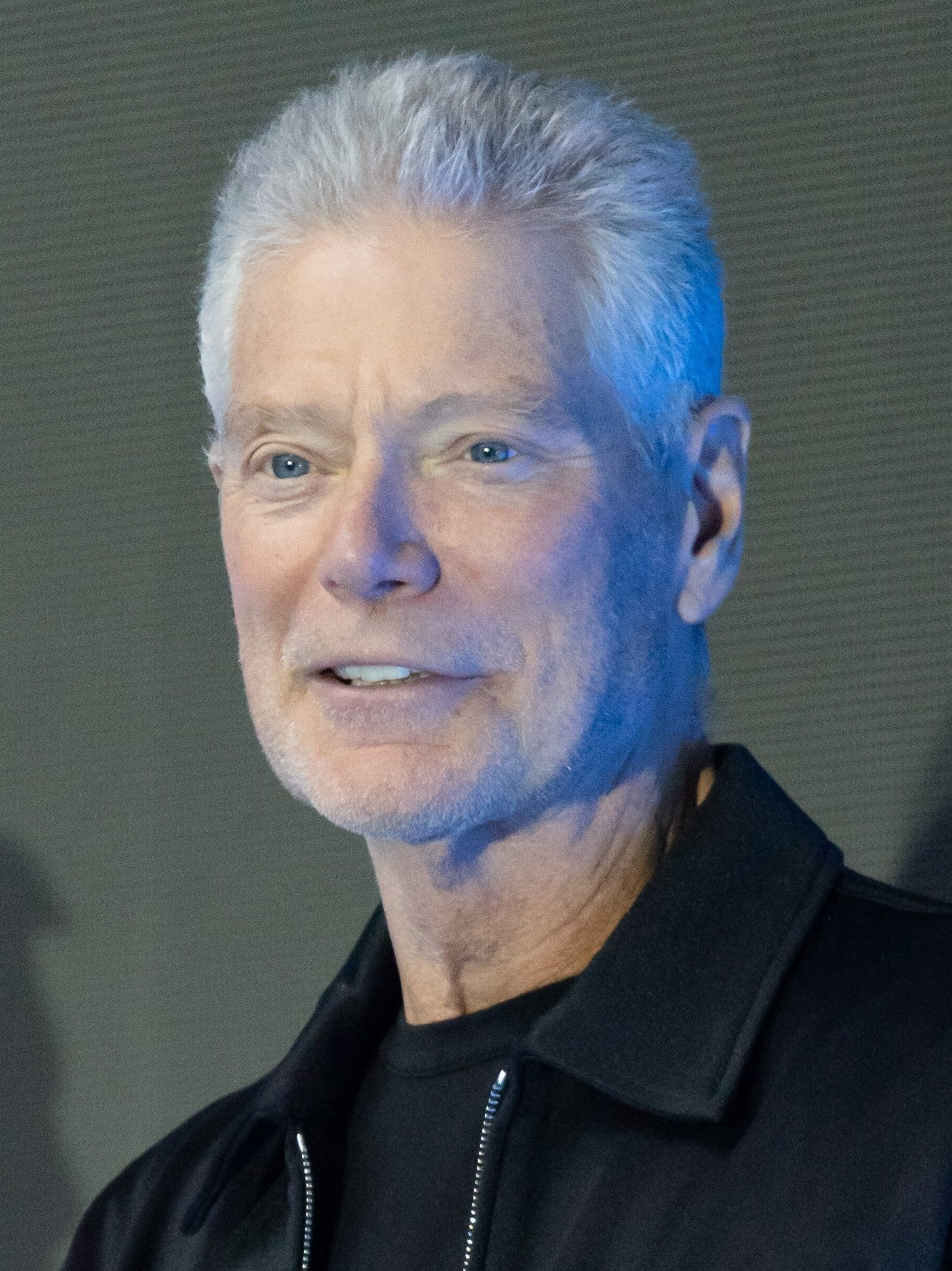
- Lang in 2022
- Born: July 11, 1952 (age 74); New York City, New York, U.S.
- Education: Swarthmore College (BA)
- Occupations: Actor; playwright; narrator; producer; screenwriter
- Years active: 1981–present
- Spouse: Kristina Watson (m. 1980)
- Children: 4, including Lucy
- Parent: Eugene Lang (father)
- Relatives: Jane Lang (sister)

Stephen Lang (born July 11, 1952) is an American stage and screen actor. He gained fame for his role as Colonel Miles Quaritch in James Cameron's Avatar (2009), for which he won the Saturn Award for Best Supporting Actor. Lang reprised the role in the sequels.

Lang is also known for roles in films such as Manhunter (1986), Last Exit to Brooklyn (1989), Gettysburg and Tombstone (both 1993), Gods and Generals (2003), Public Enemies, The Men Who Stare at Goats (both 2009), Conan the Barbarian (2011), Don't Breathe (2016) and its sequel Don't Breathe 2 (2021). His television roles include Commander Nathaniel Taylor on Terra Nova (2011), Waldo on Into the Badlands (2015-18), and David Cord on The Good Fight (2021).

Besides his film roles, Lang has had an extensive career on Broadway. He was nominated for a Tony Award for Best Featured Actor in a Play for his performance in the 1992 production of The Speed of Darkness. Other accolades include a Helen Hayes Award, and nominations for a Drama Desk and Outer Critics Circle Award, for his one-man show Beyond Glory, as well as a Lucille Lortel Award nomination. From 2004 to 2006, he was co–artistic director of the Actors Studio.

== Early life ==
Lang was born in New York City, the youngest child of Theresa Lang (née Volmar, d. 2008) and Eugene Lang (1919–2017), a prominent entrepreneur and philanthropist. Lang's mother was Catholic of German and Irish descent and his father was Jewish, with Lang being raised Jewish. Lang's paternal grandparents were emigrants from Hungary and Russia and his maternal grandparents were Irish and German. He has two elder siblings—Jane, an attorney and activist, and David, who served as an executive at REFAC, the company their father founded in 1952. Lang's father donated much of his net worth (in excess of $150 million) to charity and did not leave an inheritance to his children, believing they each needed to learn to become self-sufficient.

Lang attended elementary school in Jamaica Estates, Queens. His middle school was a New York City public school, George Ryan Junior High School, in nearby Fresh Meadows. For high school, he attended George School, a Quaker boarding school in Newtown, PA and graduated from there a year early (1969). He graduated from Swarthmore College in 1973 with a degree in English Literature.

== Career ==
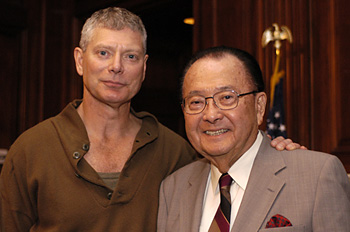
Lang (left) with Senator Daniel Inouye in 2005

Lang played Happy Loman in the 1984 Broadway revival of Death of a Salesman and the 1985 television film with Dustin Hoffman as Willy Loman, and appeared in the first Hannibal Lecter film Manhunter (1986), as reporter Freddy Lounds. He played attorney David Abrams in the television series Crime Story (1986–1988). He played the title role in the NBC movie Babe Ruth (1991). He later played the "One Armed Man" in The Fugitive, the 2000 revival starring Tim Daly. The series was a modest success but lasted only one season because of its large production budget.

In 1992, he was nominated for a Tony Award for his lead role in The Speed of Darkness. His film role in Last Exit to Brooklyn (1989) garnered him widespread critical acclaim, but its limited release prevented the film from reaching a wider audience. On stage, he was the first to play the role of Colonel Nathan Jessup in A Few Good Men, a role made famous on film (1992) by Jack Nicholson. He is the winner of over half a dozen theatre awards including the Drama Desk and Helen Hayes awards.

In 1992, he also played Hamlet in a Broadway production of Shakespeare's play.

In films, he played Maj. Gen. George E. Pickett in Gettysburg (1993) and the lead role of Thomas "Stonewall" Jackson in the Gettysburg prequel Gods and Generals (2003), both from director Ronald F. Maxwell. His interest in the Civil War has prompted him to perform at symposia of The Lincoln Forum, which, in 2020, presented him with its Richard Nelson Current Award of Achievement.

Shortly before Arthur Miller's death in February 2005, Lang appeared in his long-time friend's last play, titled Finishing the Picture. It premiered in 2004 at Chicago's Goodman Theatre, where Lang had the second run of his own play, Beyond Glory, which had premiered in Arlington, Virginia, early in 2004, and his Tony-nominated portrayal for The Speed of Darkness. Lang also performed Beyond Glory, a one-man show, for troops deployed overseas. In 2006, he played the role of Colonel Littlefield in John Patrick Shanley's play Defiance. He brought Beyond Glory to Roundabout's Off-Broadway Laura Pels Theatre in 2007. Since its New York City premiere, Beyond Glory has been nominated for a Drama Desk Award and a Lucille Lortel Award both for outstanding solo performance. A movie about the play has been produced and released.

Lang has a role in the ESPN miniseries The Bronx Is Burning, as well as roles in independent features Save Me and From Mexico with Love. He plays a lead role in James Cameron's sci-fi epic Avatar as the villainous Colonel Miles Quaritch.

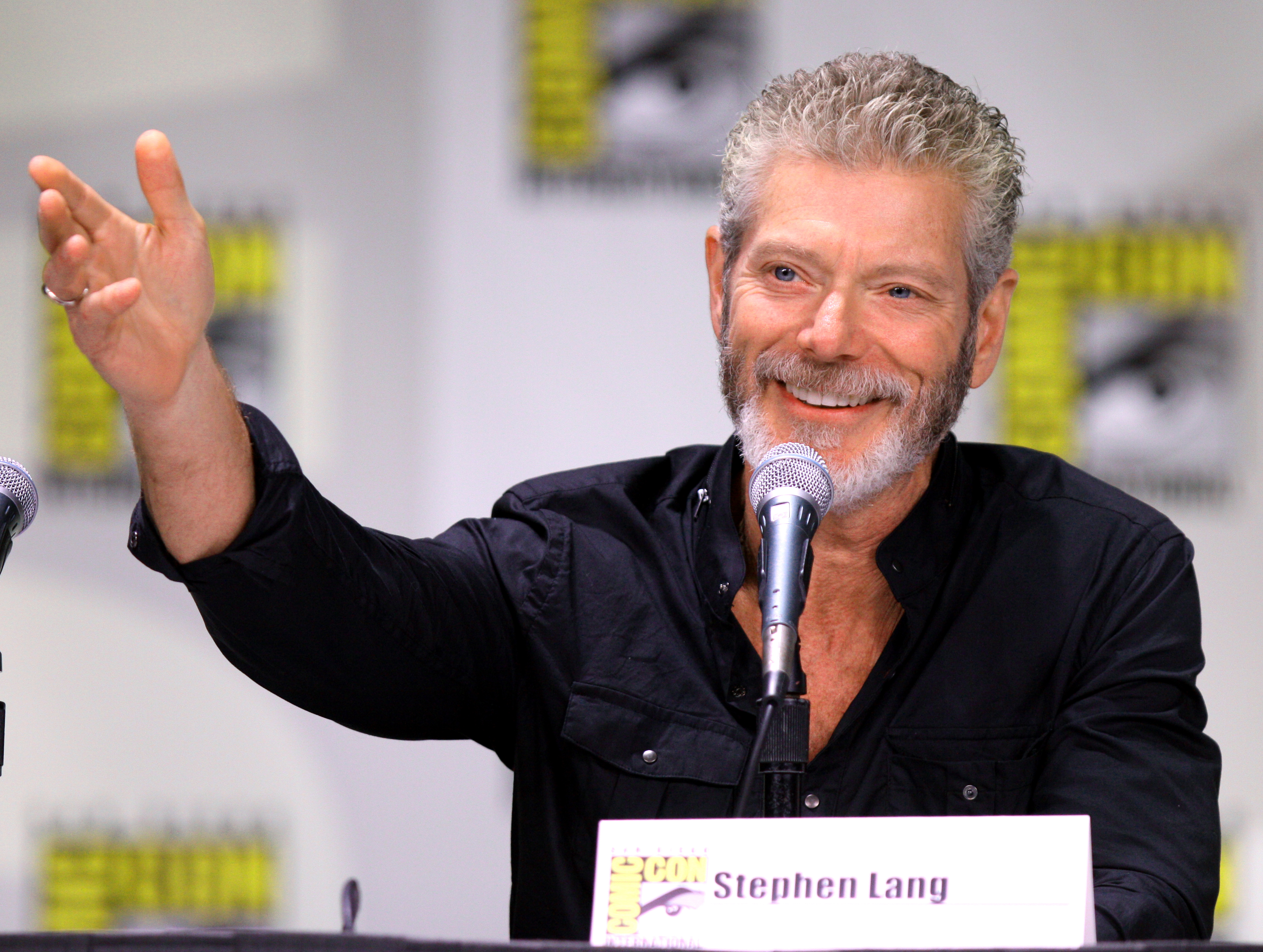
Lang promoting Terra Nova at the 2011 San Diego Comic-Con

In 2009, he appeared in Michael Mann's film Public Enemies as FBI Agent Charles Winstead, the man widely considered to have fired the shots that killed John Dillinger, and in Grant Heslov's The Men Who Stare at Goats alongside Jeff Bridges, Kevin Spacey, Ewan McGregor, and George Clooney.

Also in 2009, he narrated the audiobook Road Rage—which combines the short stories "Duel" by Richard Matheson and "Throttle" by Stephen King and Joe Hill—and guest-starred in the Law & Order: Criminal Intent season 8 finales, "Revolution" in the role of Axel Kaspers. In 2010 he performed the narration for "The Gettysburg Story: Battlefield Auto Tour," the top-selling audio tour of the Gettysburg Battlefield at Gettysburg National Military Park in Gettysburg, Pennsylvania. Written and produced by filmmaker Jake Boritt and based on works by historian Gabor Boritt it tells the story of the Battle of Gettysburg and Abraham Lincoln's Gettysburg Address in Gettysburg National Cemetery. Lang is also the narrator of the companion public television documentary The Gettysburg Story presented by Maryland Public Television.

Lang played the villain Khalar Zym in the 2011 Conan the Barbarian reboot starring Jason Momoa. He also played one of the leads, Nathaniel Taylor, in the Steven Spielberg–produced television series Terra Nova.

In February 2012, he signed on to play Mary Shannon's estranged father in a three-episode arc on the final season of the USA television series In Plain Sight.

In 2013, Lang appeared in The Monkey's Paw for Chiller TV.

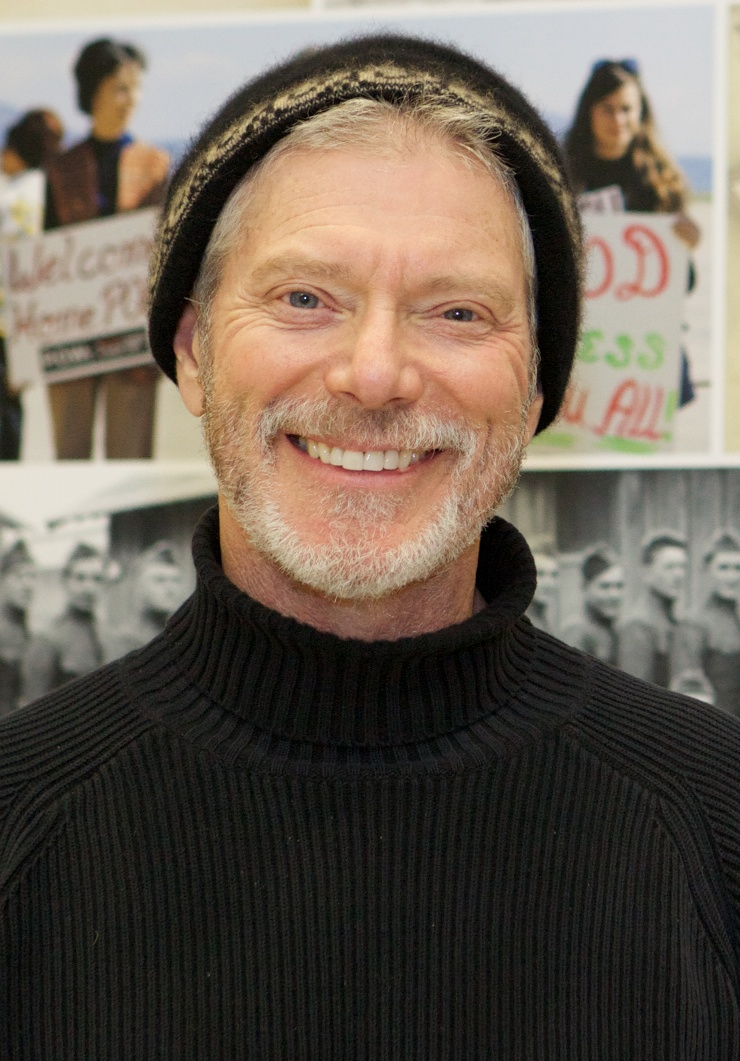
Lang in 2014

Lang has been confirmed as reprising his role as Colonel Miles Quaritch in the upcoming sequels to Avatar.

He plays Increase Mather, in a recurring role, on WGN America's first original scripted series, Salem.

Lang is part of the cast of AMC's martial-arts drama Into the Badlands. He played The Blind Man in Fede Álvarez's hit horror-thriller Don't Breathe (2016), which received positive reviews. He reprised the role in the sequel Don't Breathe 2 in 2021.

In February 2016, Lang lobbied for the role of Cable in Deadpool 2 through captioned Twitter pictures. The role ultimately went to Josh Brolin. In 2017, he played Colonel Abraham Biggs in Hostiles, from director Scott Cooper. In 2018, he appeared as father of Joe Braven (Jason Momoa), Linden Braven in the action thriller film Braven, and played Shrike in Mortal Engines, which Peter Jackson produced for Universal Pictures and Media Rights Capital.

Other recent projects include the historical epic series House of David for Amazon Studios, boxing drama The Featherweight which premiered at the Venice Film Festival, Barron's Cove with Garrett Hedlund, Sisu: Road to Revenge, and the drama The Optimist for which he won the Best Actor Prize at the Sedona International Film Festival.

== Personal life ==
Lang has been married to Kristina Watson since 1980, and together they have four children, including New York State Inspector General Lucy Lang.

Lang is trained in Kyokushin karate and has been a practitioner of Bikram Yoga since 2010.

On May 30, 2010, Swarthmore awarded him an honorary degree in recognition of his career in theatre, television, and film. His youngest son, Noah, received his bachelor's degree during the same ceremony. He also holds an Honorary Doctorate in Humane Letters from Jacksonville University and was an artist in residence at Northeastern University in 2011.

In the fall of 2015, Lang served as a Jury Member for the Woodstock Film Festival.

In 2018, Lang received the Empire State Archives and History Award from New York State Archives Partnership Trust. The annual award "acknowledges the outstanding contributions by a national figure to advance the understanding and uses of history in society."

== Filmography ==
Key
†	Denotes films that have not yet been released

=== Film ===
Year	Title	Role	Notes	Ref.
1985	Twice in a Lifetime	Keith Sobel		
1986	Band of the Hand	Joe Tegra		
1986	Manhunter	Freddy Lounds		
1987	Project X	Watts		
1989	Last Exit to Brooklyn	Harry Black		
1991	The Hard Way	The Party Crasher		
1991	Another You	Rupert Dibbs		
1993	Guilty as Sin	Phil Garson		
1993	Gettysburg	Major General George E. Pickett		
1993	Tombstone	Ike Clanton		
1995	Tall Tale	Jonas Hackett		
1995	The Amazing Panda Adventure	Dr. Michael Tyler		
1996	Loose Women	Prophet Buddy		
1996	An Occasional Hell	Alex Laughton		
1997	Shadow Conspiracy	The Agent		
1997	Niagara, Niagara	Claude		
1997	Fire Down Below	Earl Kellogg		
1999	The Story of a Bad Boy	Spygo		
2000	Trixie	Jacob Slotnick		
2001	The Proposal	Simon Bacig		
2002	D-Tox	Jack Bennett		
2003	Gods and Generals	General Thomas 'Stonewall' Jackson		
2006	The Treatment	Coach Galgano		
2006	We Fight to Be Free	James Craik	Short film	
2007	Save Me	Ted		
2009	Public Enemies	Charles Winstead		
2009	The Men Who Stare at Goats	General Hopgood		
2009	From Mexico with Love	Big Al Stevens		
2009	Avatar	Colonel Miles Quaritch		
2010	Christina	Inspector Edgar Reinhardt		
2010	White Irish Drinkers	Patrick Leary		
2010	False Creek Stories	Narrator	Short film	
2011	Conan the Barbarian	Khalar Zym		
2011	Someday This Pain Will Be Useful to You	Barry Rogers		
2013	Officer Down	Lieutenant Jake LaRussa		
2013	The Girl on the Train	Detective Lloyd Martin		
2013	Pioneer	John Ferris		
2013	Pawn	Charlie		
2013	The Gettysburg Story	Narrator	Documentary film	
2013	The Monkey's Paw	Tony Cobb		
2013	The Wheatfield	James Jackson Purman	Short film; also writer and producer	
2014	The Nut Job	King	Voice role	
2014	In the Blood	Casey	Direct-to-video film	
2014	Sun Belt Express	Border Patrol Officer Rick		
2014	Jarhead 2: Field of Fire	Major James Gavins	Direct-to-video film	
2014	A Good Marriage	Holt Ramsey		
2014	Gutshot Straight	Duffy Sereglia	Direct-to-video film	
2014	23 Blast	Coach Farris		
2015	Exeter	Father Conway		
2015	Band of Robbers	Injun Joe		
2015	Gridlocked	Korver		
2015	Beyond Glory: Tour of Duty	Various roles	Documentary film	
2015	Isolation	William		
2016	Don't Breathe	Norman Nordstrom / The Blind Man		
2016	Beyond Valkyrie: Dawn of the 4th Reich	Major General Emil F. Reinhardt		
2017	Hostiles	Colonel Abraham Biggs		
2017	Justice	Mayor Pierce		
2018	Braven	Linden Braven		
2018	Uncharted Live Action Fan Film	Victor "Sully" Sullivan	Short film	
2018	Mortal Engines	Shrike		
2019	The Gandhi Murder	Sunil Raina		
2019	VFW	Fred Parras	Also executive producer	
2019	Rogue Warfare	President	Direct-to-video film	
2019	Rogue Warfare 2: The Hunt	President	Direct-to-video film; also co-executive producer	
2020	Rogue Warfare: Death of a Nation	President	Direct-to-video film	
2020	Death in Texas	John		
2021	The Seventh Day	Archbishop		
2021	Don't Breathe 2	Norman Nordstrom / The Blind Man	Also executive producer	
2022	The Lost City	Fantasy Villain	Credited as Slang	
2022	My Love Affair with Marriage	Jonas	Voice	
2022	Mid-Century	Frederick Banner	Also executive producer	
2022	Old Man	Old Man		
2022	The Independent	Gordon White		
2022	Avatar: The Way of Water	Colonel Miles Quaritch		
2023	The Featherweight	Bill Gore		
2023	Muzzle	Leland		
2023	The Optimist	Herbert Heller		
2024	Barron's Cove	Benji		
2025	Sisu: Road to Revenge	Yeagor Draganov		
2025	Avatar: Fire and Ash	Colonel Miles Quaritch		
2026	Hellfire	Jack Hollister / The Drifter / Nomada		
TBA	Gettysburg 1863 †	John L. Burns	Post-production	
TBA	The Dregs †		Post-production	
TBA	Isolation Booth †		Post-production	

=== Television ===
Year	Title	Role	Notes	Ref.
1981	We're Fighting Back	Janos	Television film	
1982	American Playhouse	Vassilis	Episode: "King of America"; credited as Steve Lang	
1985	Death of a Salesman	Harold "Happy" Loman	Television film	
1986	Stone Pillow	Tim	Television film	
1986–1988	Crime Story	Attorney David Abrams	Main role; 33 episodes	
1988	The Boys	Unknown	Episode: "Gene's Problem"	
1989	Finish Line	Coach Harkins	Television film	
1989	The Equalizer	Joseph Morrison	Episode: "Lullaby of Darkness"	
1991	Babe Ruth	Babe Ruth	Television film	
1992	Taking Back My Life: The Nancy Ziegenmeyer Story	Steven Ziegenmeyer	Television film	
1993	Darkness Before Dawn	Guy Grand	Television film	
1993	TriBeCa	Lou	Episodes: "The Box" and "Honor"	
1994	Murder Between Friends	Kerry Myers	Television film	
1994	Baseball	Various voices	Documentary miniseries	
1994	Performance	The Boss	Episode: "The Mother"	
1995	A Season of Hope	Michael Hackett	Television film	
1995	The Possession of Michael D.	Michael	Television film	
1995	The Fresh Prince of Bel-Air	Criminal Gun Shooter	Episode: "Bullets Over Bel-Air"	
1996	The West	Various voices	Documentary miniseries	
1996	Gang in Blue	Moose Tavola	Television film	
1996	Strangers	Theo	Episode: "Ceremony"	
1997	Journey of the Heart	Thomas Deblois	Television film	
1997	The Outer Limits	Dr. James Houghton	Episode: "New Lease"	
1997	Dellaventura	Eric Solinkin	Episode: "Pilot"	
1997	Liberty!	George Washington	Voice; 6 episodes	
1997	Automatic Avenue	Unknown	Unsold television pilot	
1998	Dead Man's Gun	Clay Strand	Episode: "The Gambler"	
1998	Escape: Human Cargo	Dennis McNatt	Television film	
1998	A Town Has Turned to Dust	Sheriff Harvey Denton	Television film	
1998	Killer App	Jann	Television film	
1999	At the Mercy of a Stranger	Dr. Thomas Cooper	Television film	
2000	Running Mates	Ron Noble	Television film; uncredited role	
2000–2001	The Fugitive	Ben Charnquist	Recurring role; 10 episodes	
2001	After the Storm	Sergeant Major Jim	Television film	
2002	Ed	Jack Foster	Episode: "Wheel of Justice"	
2003	Code 11-14	Justin Shaw	Television film	
2003	Law & Order: Special Victims Unit	Michael Baxter	Episode: "Escape"	
2004	The I Inside	Mr. Travitt	Television film	
2005	Jonny Zero	Officer Tanner	Episode: "To Serve and to Protect"	
2005	Law & Order	Terry Dorn	Episode: "New York Minute"	
2007	The Bronx Is Burning	Inspector Timothy Dowd	Miniseries; 3 episodes	
2008	Medal of Honor	Narrator	Documentary special	
2009	Law & Order: Criminal Intent	Axel Kaspers	Episode: "Revolution"	
2009	Psych	Mr. Salamatchia	Episode: "Shawn Gets the Yips"	
2010	Matadors	Victor Galloway	Unsold television pilot	
2011	Terra Nova	Commander Nathaniel Taylor	Lead role; 13 episodes	
2012	In Plain Sight	James Wiley Shannon	Recurring role; 3 episodes (season 5)	
2013	Reckless	Tom	Unsold television pilot	
2014–2017	Salem	Increase Mather	Recurring role; 10 episodes	
2015	To Appomattox	John Brown	Episode: "The Point"	
2015–2018	Into the Badlands	Waldo	Recurring role; 13 episodes	
2016–2017	Shades of Blue	Terrence Linklater	Recurring role; 3 episodes (seasons 1-2)	
2019	The Rookie	Chief Trent Williams	Episode: "The Checklist"	
2021	Calls	Dr. Wheating	Voice; episode: "Leap Year Girl"	
2021	The Good Fight	David Cord	Recurring role; 7 episodes (season 5)	
2024	Law & Order: Organized Crime	Angus Boone	Recurring role; 3 episodes (season 4)	
2024	Solar Opposites	Sergeant Argent	Voice; episodes: "The Educational Sprinkler Device" and "The Battle of Zab 9"	
2025–present	House of David	Samuel	Recurring role; 10 episodes	

=== Radio ===
Year	Title	Role
2021	Marvel's Wastelanders: Hawkeye	Clint Barton / Hawkeye

=== Video games ===
Year	Title	Role	Notes
2009	Avatar: The Game	Colonel Miles Quaritch	
2013	Call of Duty: Ghosts	Elias Walker	
2023	Avatar: Frontiers of Pandora	Colonel Miles Quaritch	

== Awards and nominations ==
Year	Award	Category	Nominated work	Result
1991	Tony Award	Best Performance by a Featured Actor in a Play	The Speed of Darkness	Nominated
2003	Grace Award for Acting	—N/a	Gods and Generals	Won
2009	MTV Movie Award	Best Fight (with Sam Worthington)	Avatar	Nominated
2009	MTV Movie Award	Best Villain	Avatar	Nominated
2009	Saturn Award	Best Supporting Actor	Avatar	Won
2009	Teen Choice Award	Choice Movie: Fight (with Sam Worthington)	Avatar	Nominated
2009	Teen Choice Award	Choice Movie: Villain	Avatar	Nominated
2016	Fangoria Chainsaw Award	Best Supporting Actor	Don't Breathe	Won

Preceded by Estelle Parsons; Vacant (2003–2004)	Artistic Director of the Actors Studio; 2004–2006; With: Carlin Glynn and Lee Grant	Succeeded by Carlin Glynn; Lee Grant
