= Talhotblond (2009 film) =

- Poster
- Directed by: Barbara Schroeder
- Written by: Barbara Schroeder
- Produced by: Answers Productions
- Edited by: Barbara Schroeder
- Release date: 2009
- Running time: 83 minutes
- Country: United States
- Language: English

Talhotblond is a 2009 documentary directed by Barbara Schroeder. It details an Internet love triangle that resulted in a real-life murder.

== Plot ==
Thomas Montgomery (screen name: marinesniper), a 47-year-old married man in Clarence, New York, pleaded guilty to murdering his 22-year-old co-worker Brian Barrett (screen name: beefcake). The two men were involved in a love triangle with "Jessi", whom they thought to be an 18-year-old girl with the screen name 'talhotblond'. While both men knew each other from work, neither had ever met "Jessi" in person.

In the beginning of their online relationship, Thomas presented himself as an 18-year-old man named "Tommy" who was in basic training and later deployed. His wife later discovered the affair and revealed the truth to "Jessi", but the two continued to chat.

However, while "Jessi" was a real person, Thomas had unknowingly been chatting online with her mother, Mary Shieler, who was catfishing, posing as her daughter online. Jessi was tragically unaware of her mother's macabre undertakings until after Barrett's murder, when her mother's role in the case came to light.

== Production ==
The film's TV rights were sold to MSNBC. Paramount Studios bought all remaining rights. Directed and written by Emmy award-winning journalist Barbara Schroeder, the film features appearances by convicted murderer Thomas Montgomery, clinical psychologist and attorney Dr. Rex Julian Beaber, Erie County prosecutor Ken Case, Erie County Sheriff Ron Kenyon; Oak Hill, West Virginia Sgt. Lee Kirk; the parents of Brian Barrett, and Tim Shieler. Dr. Beaber serves throughout the film as a commentator on the social-psychological dimensions of the case.

== Awards ==
Winner of the Seattle International Film Festival's 2009 Best Documentary Grand Jury Award and a finalist at the International Documentary Film Festival Amsterdam.

== Lifetime movie ==
On June 23, 2012, Lifetime aired a television film based on the story, TalhotBlond, directed by Courteney Cox, with Garret Dillahunt as Thomas and Laura San Giacomo as his wife Carol (in real life, Cindy), who slowly starts feeling disconnected from her husband. Brian Barrett, Montgomery's young coworker, was portrayed by Brando Eaton.

Cox appeared in the film as well, as Carol's friend, coworker, and confidante. The names of Jessi and Mary Shieler were changed to Katie (played by Ashley Hinshaw) and Beth (played by Molly Hagan) Brooks, respectively. The Shielers' location was moved from West Virginia to Indiana.
