= All Haunt's Sound =

Studio album by the Alice Rose
- Released: February 21, 2009
- Recorded: March – December 2008 at Music Lane Studio, Austin, Texas
- Genres: Indie rock, indie pop
- Length: 37:57
- Label: Emerald Wood Records
- Producers: Andy Sharp, the Alice Rose

The Alice Rose chronology
Phonographic Memory (2006)	All Haunt's Sound (2009)

All Haunt's Sound is the second album by the indie pop group the Alice Rose, released in 2009.

The album was recorded between March and December 2008, with the producer Andy Sharp at Music Lane Studio in Austin, Texas. The record contains 12 songs written by JoDee Purkeypile and has a more modern sound than its predecessor, Phonographic Memory, with the style of the material containing influences of psychedelic folk ("Black Tide", "I Know Your Ghost") and indie rock ("She Did Command", "Maybe a Ride", "Waste Away"). It is the band's only album with the guitarist Gregg White, who contributed guitar to two songs. The album was released on February 21, 2009, on Emerald Wood Records.

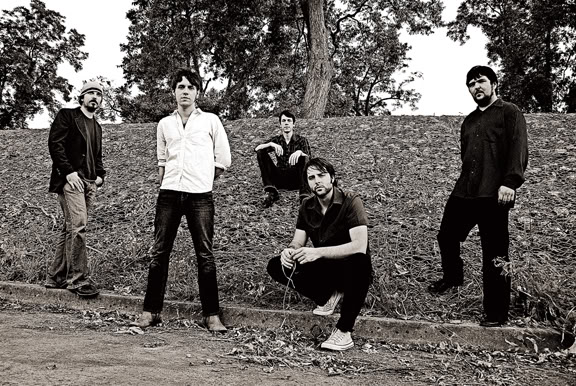
The Alice Rose, August 2008

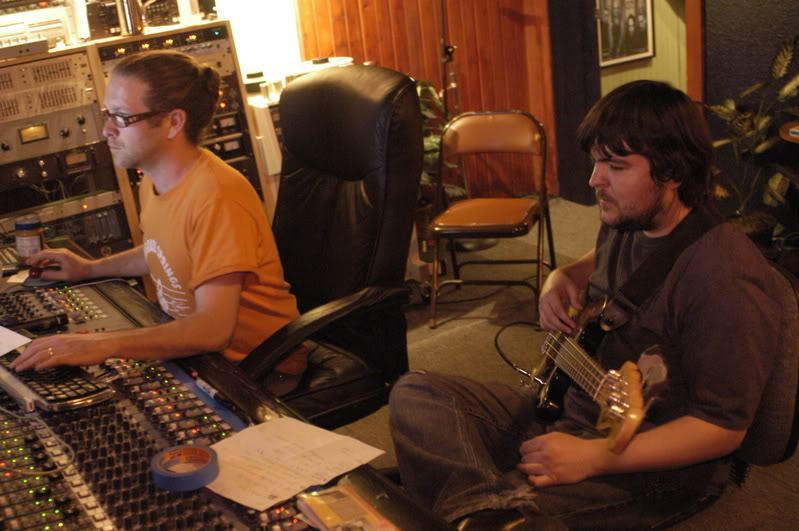
Engineer Andy Sharp and Sean Crooks at Music Lane Studio, February 2008

== Track listing ==
1. "She Did Command" - 2:54
2. "Waste Away"" - 3:10
3. "Agony Aunt"" - 3:02
4. "Maybe a Ride"" - 3:21
5. "Lady Lion"" - 3:27
6. "Slumberella"" - 2:37
7. "It's All Allowed"" - 3:09
8. "Rags of Autumn"" - 3:52
9. "I Know Your Ghost"" - 2:27
10. "Easter Anne"" - 3:20
11. "There's No One In There"" - 3:12
12. "Black Tide"" - 3:26

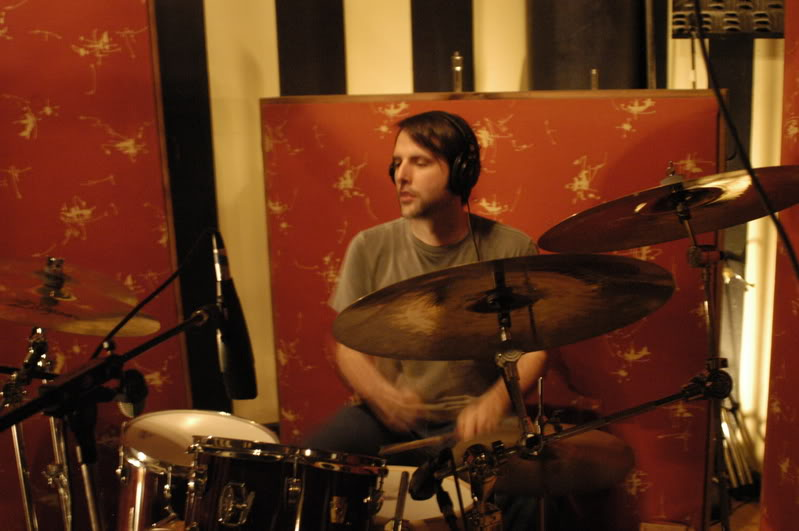
Chris Sensat at Music Lane Studio, February 2008.

- All songs by JoDee Purkeypile (2009 Emerald Wood Music, ASCAP)

== Notes ==
- The album's cover photograph, taken by Chris Sensat, resembles a witch, but is actually a crack on a wall in downtown San Antonio, Texas.
- The album's final mixes were completed on Purkeypile's 27th birthday, January 24, 2009.
- Aaron Horne, who engineered the band's "Body Offering" single, recorded brass parts for "Maybe a Ride" at his home studio and emailed them to the group.
- Austin's KUT FM 90.5 used "Maybe a Ride" extensively for radio advertisements.

== Personnel ==
- JoDee Purkeypile: lead vocals, backing vocals, rhythm guitar, lead guitar, piano ("Lady Lion"), Mellotron ("Maybe a Ride", "Lady Lion", "I Know Your Ghost"), percussion
- Sean Crooks: bass guitar, backing vocals, percussion
- Chris Sensat: drums, percussion
- Brendan Rogers: organ, piano, Mellotron, percussion, backing vocals ("Maybe a Ride", "Easter Anne", "Black Tide")

== Additional musicians ==
- Gregg White: lead guitar ("Waste Away", "There's No One In There")
- Aaron Horne: brass ("Maybe a Ride")
- Andy Sharp: triangle ("Lady Lion")
