= Eugene Lang =

American philanthropist (1919–2017)

- Born: Eugene Michael Lang; March 16, 1919; New York City, U.S.
- Died: April 8, 2017 (aged 98); New York City, U.S.
- Education: Swarthmore College; Columbia Business School
- Occupations: Businessman; philanthropist
- Spouse: Theresa Volmar (m. 1946; died 2008)
- Children: 3, including Jane and Stephen

Eugene Michael Lang (March 16, 1919 – April 8, 2017) was an American businessman and philanthropist who founded REFAC Technology Development Corporation in 1951. REFAC held patents relating to liquid crystal displays, automated teller machines, credit card verification systems, bar code scanners, video cassette recorders, cassette players, camcorders, electronic keyboards, and spreadsheets, and filed thousands of lawsuits against other corporations as part of a strategic operational and technological licensing and exportation process. Lang created the I Have A Dream Foundation in 1981, Project Pericles in 2001, and the Lang Youth Medical Program in 2003. He was also the chairman of the board at Swarthmore College.

== Early life and education ==
Lang was born in 1919 in New York City, the son of Ida (née Kaslow) and Daniel Lang, Jewish immigrants from Russia and Hungary. He attended public schools including Townsend Harris High School. At the age of 15 he was admitted as a scholarship student to Swarthmore College, and earned his B.A. in economics in 1938. He then earned his M.S. from Columbia Business School in 1940. He studied mechanical engineering at the Brooklyn Polytechnic Institute from 1940 to 1941.

== Career ==
Lang created the I Have A Dream Foundation in 1981, Project Pericles in 2001, and the Lang Youth Medical Program in 2003. He has also made large donations to Swarthmore College, The New School's undergraduate liberal arts college (now known as Eugene Lang College), and the Eugene M. Lang Center for Entrepreneurship at Columbia Business School, which is part of Columbia University.

In 1986, Lang received the Award for Greatest Public Service Benefiting the Disadvantaged, an award given out annually by Jefferson Awards. Also that year Harry Reasoner interviewed Lang discussing the school program for the news show 60 minutes.

In 1996, President Bill Clinton awarded him the Presidential Medal of Freedom. His philanthropies, focused primarily on education, altogether exceed $150,000,000. Due to his philanthropy in education, he held 38 honorary degrees as of December 2012.

In 2003 he endowed the Lang Youth Medical Program at NewYork-Presbyterian-Columbia Medical Center. This 6-year program immerses underserved Washington Heights youths in science-based afterschool program.

== Personal life and death ==
Lang was married to Theresa (née Volmar) Lang from 1946 until her death in 2008. They had three children: Jane Lang, David Lang and Stephen Lang.

Lang died at his home in New York City on April 8, 2017, at the age of 98.
