= Splinter (2008 film) =

- Film poster
- Directed by: Toby Wilkins
- Written by: Kai Barry; Ian Shorr; Toby Wilkins
- Story by: Toby Wilkins
- Produced by: Ted Kroeber; Kai Barry
- Starring: Shea Whigham; Paulo Costanzo; Jill Wagner; Rachel Kerbs
- Cinematography: Nelson Cragg
- Edited by: David Michael Maurer
- Music by: Elia Cmíral
- Distributed by: Magnet Releasing
- Release date: October 31, 2008
- Running time: 82 minutes
- Country: United States
- Language: English
- Box office: $510,358

Splinter is a 2008 American horror film directed by Toby Wilkins and starring Shea Whigham, Paulo Costanzo, and Jill Wagner. It was filmed near Oklahoma City, Oklahoma. It had a limited theatrical release on October 31, 2008. HDNet Movies aired the film two days prior to its theatrical release.

== Plot ==
At a sleepy gas station, the pump attendant is attacked by an animal infected by an unknown organism manifesting as large protruding splinters. A young couple, Seth Belzer and Polly Watt, drive for a romantic camping trip in the forests of Oklahoma, but are car-jacked by an escaped convict, Dennis Farell, and his drug-addict girlfriend, Lacey Belisle. The group gets a flat tire when they run over a splinter-infected animal on the road. They find shelter at the now-abandoned gas station.

Lacey discovers the horribly-infected pump attendant, writhing in the bathroom. She is attacked and killed by the monster, but her corpse slowly reanimates and becomes a new creature, which attacks the remaining survivors. While fighting her, Seth, Polly and Dennis discover that severed pieces of the infected victims are capable of attacking on their own. Sheriff Terri Frankel arrives and attempts to arrest Dennis, but is ripped in half by Lacey's corpse. The creature takes the top half of the officer's body and bonds with it, becoming a larger creature. The trio hide in the walk-in refrigerator when a piece of the creature's arm attacks them. It is discovered that Dennis has been infected, as his left arm violently twists on its own. Seth and Polly amputate his arm to prevent the infection from spreading. Dennis explains that he had been pricked by a splinter from the dead creature they encountered on the road. Seth discovers that the creatures themselves are a fungus taking control of the corpses they infect and consuming the blood in the body, using the currently zombified host to seek out fresh and new hosts. Because of this, they hunt based on temperature and attack the warmest thing they can find.

By lowering his body temperature with bags of ice, Seth sneaks past the creature to the police car, while Polly and Dennis distract it with fireworks. Seth discovers that, without the keys, the car and the police radio inside are useless. His body temperature rises again, forcing Dennis to leave the gas station to lure the creature away from him. The creature enters the gas station, and Dennis and Polly hide in the freezer. The discarded fireworks ignite a trail of flammable liquid, and the gas station catches on fire. Seth retrieves a shotgun from the police car and helps Polly and Dennis escape. Dennis is infected after helping to keep the creature at bay while Seth and Polly escape. He shoots one of the gas pumps with the shotgun, and the creature is engulfed in flames, killing it. Dennis, still infected, gives Seth and Polly a key to a bank account, telling them to give it to the wife of a man he shot, who later died. Dennis shoots directly into the propane tanks, incinerating himself, the station, and any remaining infected corpses.

Seth and Polly wander into the distance as other infected creature corpses lie dormant in the woods.

== Cast ==
- Paulo Costanzo as Seth Belzer
- Jill Wagner as Polly Watt
- Shea Whigham as Dennis Farell
- Rachel Kerbs as Lacey Belisle
- Laurel Whitsett as Sheriff Terri Frankell
- Charles Baker as Blake Sherman Jr.

== Production ==
Wilkins said the original script was a "classic siege movie" that interested him. The monster in this script was more generic, but he realized that an idea he and a friend had been developing about a parasitic creature would fit in well. Wilkins found the concept of a creature that takes over its host to be scarier than one that simply kills it. Like 28 Days Later and The Thing, he wanted his characters to briefly fight against the infection before losing their personality. Wilkins also wanted to introduce horror from the creature's ignorance of how human bodies work and its resulting abuse of the host's body. To choreograph the jerky movements of the infected, Wilkins used multiple performers, including a gymnast, mime, and stuntperson. Most of the effects are practical. Shooting took place in Oklahoma City.

== Reception ==
On review aggregator website Rotten Tomatoes, Splinter received an approval rating of 74% rating based on 38 reviews and an average rating of 6.3/10. Its consensus reads, "Never taking itself too seriously, Splinter scores as a fast-paced, fun thriller with more than enough scares." On Metacritic, which assigns a normalized rating to reviews, the film has a weighted average score of 58 out of 100, based on 13 critics, indicating "mixed or average reviews".

Claudia Puig from USA Today gave the film 2.5 out of 4 stars, writing, "This is classic Halloween fun with plenty of thrills and chills, surprisingly believable performances and healthy doses of humor." Chuck Wilson from The Village Voice wrote, "Buoyed by solid ensemble work, some yuckily effective special effects, and a script that subverts genre convention by having its characters do smart things instead of stupid ones (mostly), Splinter earns our respect while delivering 82 minutes of lean, mean fun." Marc Savlov of The Austin Chronicle awarded the film 1.5 out of 5 stars, stating that the film "would have made a far more effective short than the feature-length drag it is."

Splinter won six awards at the Screamfest Horror Film Festival: Best Editing, Best Score, Best Special Effects, Best Make-Up, Best Directing and Best Picture. It was a nominee for Best Horror Film at the 35th Annual Saturn Awards, but it lost to Hellboy II: The Golden Army. It was also nominated in Spike TV's 2009 Scream Awards for Most Memorable Mutilation for the arm removal scene, but lost to Saw V's Pendulum Trap.
