= Toby Wilkins =

British film director (born 1972)

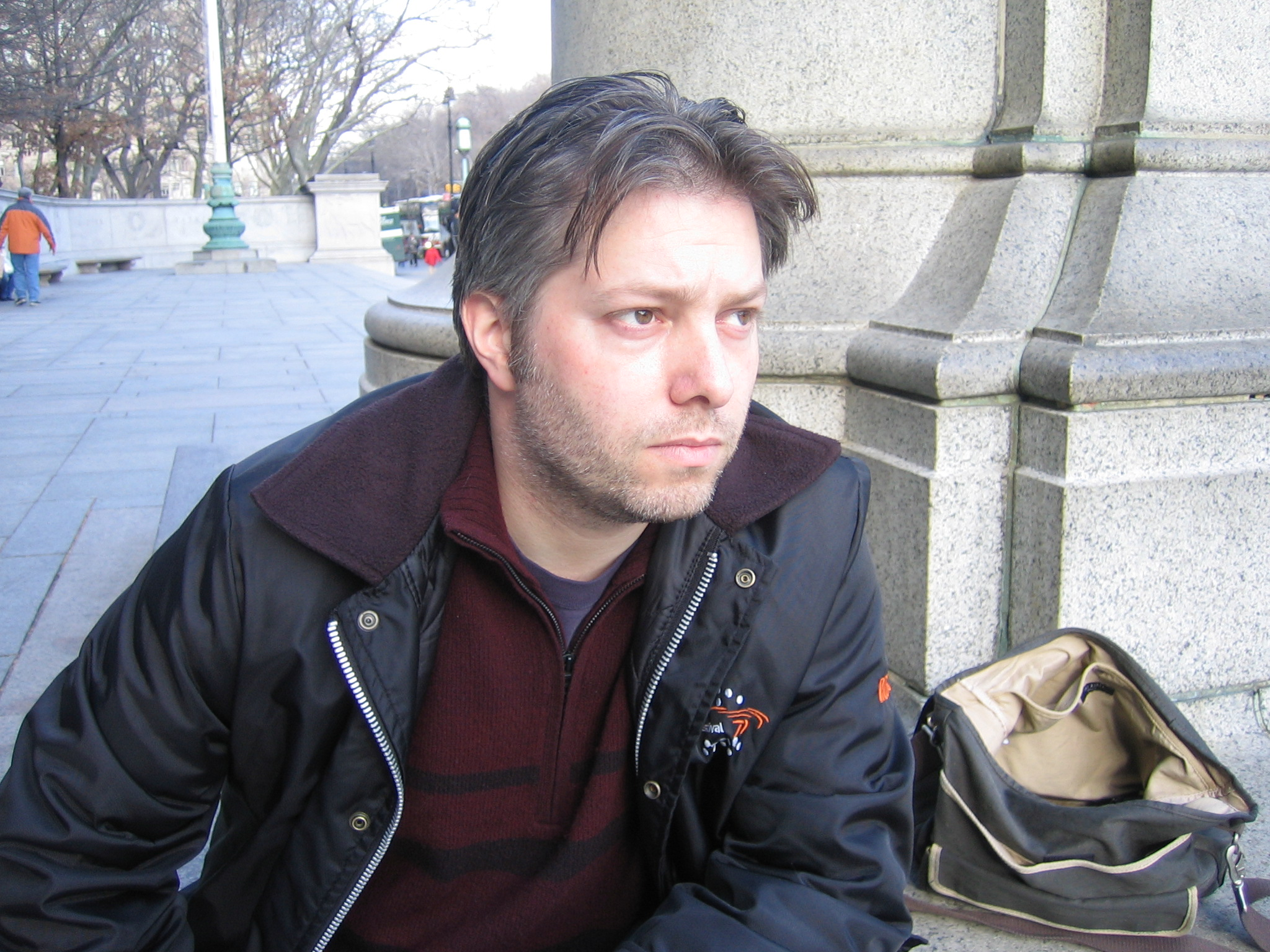
- Toby Wilkins (2006)
- Born: 27 May 1972 (age 53); Maldon, Essex
- Occupation: Film director

Toby Wilkins is a British film director. He has directed two feature films, Splinter and The Grudge 3, and several award-winning short films.

== Filmography ==
- The Grudge 3 (2009)
- Splinter (2008)
- Devil's Trade FEARnet web series (2007)
- Kidney Thieves, short film (2006)
- Tales from the Grudge web series (2006)
- Staring at the Sun, short film (2005)
