= Fancine =

Spanish film award

FANCINE - Fantastic Film Festival of the University of Málaga
- Venue: Cervantes Theatre; Albéniz Cinema; Rectorate UMA
- Country: Málaga, Spain
- Presented by: University of Málaga
- Established: 1990
- First award: 1 November 1990; 36 years ago
- Website: fancine.org/en/

The Fancine Fantastic Film Festival of the University of Málaga (Spanish: FANCINE Festival de Cine Fantástico de la Universidad de Málaga), is an annual film festival held by the University of Málaga in Málaga, Spain. It has been held since 1990 in the month of November. It focuses on the fantastic, science-fiction, and horror movie genres.

== History ==
The festival was started in 1990, initially called the "International Week of Fantastic Cinema of the University of Málaga", as a fantastic genre film exhibition. The promoter of the idea was Ramón Reina, who held the position of director during 19 editions.

In its first years, the festival presented a collection of the best fantasy films in the history of the fantastic genre. In 1997, it assumed an international competition character, emphasising fantastic contemporary films that are being produced, apart from the classic movies sample.

In the 2008 edition, the organization was renamed the International Fantastic Film Festival, and its hallmark is Fancine. Oscar Marine (author of works made for Julio Médem, Álex de la Iglesia, and Pedro Almodóvar) created the new logo and posters.

In the 2010 edition, Fernando Ocaña, is appointed the new director. He will be responsible for managing the festival until 2013.

Since 2014, a committee has been in charge of the direction, comprising members of the different academic sections of the University of Málaga: professors, students, and administrative and services staff.

Considered one of the oldest festivals of the Andalusian audiovisual landscape and one of the most important in Spain of this genre, it is a member of the European Fantastic Film Festivals Federation (EFFFF). As of 2009 it was the only international festival financed by a public university.

== Objectives and description ==
The presentation of a selection of the best world film production of feature as well as short films of fantastic genre under all its variants (fantasy, science-fiction, terror, adventures, thriller, etc.), as well as promoting and disseminating the cinematographic culture. Fancine is run by the University of Málaga, a non-profit institution, and attempts to create a more universal and affordable access to its offering of the best fantastic films.

== Contents ==
=== Competition sections ===
- FEATURE FILMS IN COMPETITION.
- REAL-IMAGE SHORT FILMS. Official section.
- ANIMATED SHORT FILMS. Official section.
- ONLINE SHORT FILMS. Official section. Productions of less than five minutes duration, awarded based on online voting.

=== Out of competition sections ===
- INFORMATIVE SECTION. Selection of recent productions of interest.
- CLASSICS. Selection of the best fantasy films of all times.
- FAMILY FANTASTIC. Movies for all audiences.
- HORROR ZONE. Movies for fans of the genre in its most extreme side.
- TRIBUTES. Cycles commemorating an event or a personality related to the fantasy genre.

== Winners ==
=== Awards by the Official Jury ===
==== Best Feature Film ====
Year	Best Film	Best Director	Ref.
1997	The Addiction (Abel Ferrara)	Ole Bornedal (Nightwatch) (United States)	
1998	Kissed (from producers Dean English and Lynne Stopkewich)	Lynne Stopkewich (Kissed) (Canada)	
1999	Body Troopers (produced by Eric Jacobsen)	Vibeke Idsöe (Body Troopers) (Norway)	
2000	The Quiet Family (Kim Ji-Woon)	Kim Ji-Woon (The Quiet Family) (South Korea)	
2001	Ginger Snaps (John Fawcett)	Veit Helmer (Tuvalu) (Canada)	
2002	The Black Door (Kit Wong)	Kit Wong (The Black Door) (United States)	
2003	May (Lucky McKee)	Alexander Sokurov (Russian Ark) (United States)	
2004	Robot Stories (Greg Pak)	Greg Pak (Robot Stories) (United States)	
2005	One Point 0 (Jeff Renfroe and Martein Thorsson)	Lee Kwang Hoon (The Legend of the Evil Lake) (United States)	
2006	Doll Master (Jeong Yong)	David Slade (Hard Candy) (United States)	
2007	Marmorera (Markus Fischer)	Park Chan-wook (I'm a Cyborg, But That's OK) (South Korea)	
2008	Let the Right One In (Tomas Alfredson)	Tomas Alfredson (Let the Right One In) (Sweden)	
2009	Left Bank (Pieter Van Hees)	Hélène Cattet and Bruno Forzani (Amer) (Belgium)	
2010	Vampires (Vincent Lanoo)	Pater Sparrow (1) (Belgium)	
2011	Bellflower (Evan Glodell)	Benoît Jacquot (Deep in the Woods) (United States)	
2012	Excision (Richard Bates Jr.)	Richard Bates Jr. (Excision) (United States)	
2013	The Battery (Jeremy Gardner)	Esteban Larraín (La Pasión de Michelangelo) (United States)	
2014	Cruel and Unusual (Merlin Dervisevic)	Fabrice Du Welz (Alleluia) (Canada)	
2015	Tag (Sion Sono)	Hou Hsiao-hsien (The Assassin") (Japan)	
2016	Under the Shadow (Babak Anvari)		
2017	Let the Corpses Tan (Hélène Cattet and Bruno Forzan)		
2018	Border (Ali Abbasi)		
2019	Bacurau (Juliano Dornelles, Kleber Mendoça Filho)		
2020	Wendy (Benh Zeitlin)	Josh Ruben (Scare Me) (United States)	
2021	The Colony (Tim Fehlbaum)	Zhang Yimou (Cliff Walkers) (China)	
2022	Vesper (Kristina Buožytė and Bruno Samper)	Park Chan-wook (Decision to Leave) (South Korea)	
2023	Concrete Utopia	Um Tae-hwa (Concrete Utopia) (South Korea)	
2024	Death Is a Problem for the Living (Teemu Nikki)	Quentin Dupieux (The Second Act) (France)	
2025	The Secret Agent (Kleber Mendonça Filho)	Bi Gan (Resurrection) (China)	

==== Awards with financial grant ====
- Best Feature Film (9.000 euros)
- Best Fiction Short Film (3.000 euros)
- Best Animation Short Film (3.000 euros)

==== Honorary awards ====
- Best Director
- Best Actor
- Best Actress
- Best Original or Adapted Screenplay
- Best Photography
- Best Special Effects
- Selection of the Best European Fantastic Short Film for the Méliès d'Or

=== Awards by the Young Jury ===
==== Awards with financial grant ====
- Best Real-image short film (3.000 euros)
- Best Animation short film (3.000 euros)

==== Honorary awards ====
- Silver Méliès to the Best Fantastic European Short Film and selection of the same to compete for the Golden Méliès award in this category.

=== Public awards ===
==== Honorary awards ====
- Best Feature Film
- Best Real-Image Short Film
- Best Animation Short Film

== See also ==
- List of fantastic and horror film festivals
