= King Knight =

2021 film by Richard Bates Jr.

- Theatrical release poster
- Directed by: Richard Bates Jr.
- Written by: Richard Bates Jr.
- Produced by: Rob Higginbotham; Colin Tanner
- Starring: Matthew Gray Gubler; Angela Sarafyan; Andy Milonakis; Kate Comer; Nelson Franklin; Emily Chang; Johnny Pemberton; Josh Fadem; Barbara Crampton; Ray Wise
- Cinematography: Shaheen Seth
- Edited by: Brit DeLillo
- Music by: Steve Damstra II
- Distributed by: XYZ Films
- Release dates: August 8, 2021 (Fantasia Film Festival); February 17, 2022 (United States)
- Running time: 78 minutes
- Country: United States
- Language: English

King Knight is a 2021 American comedy film written and directed by Richard Bates Jr.

== Plot ==
As admired leaders of their Wiccan coven, Thorn and his life partner Willow provide couples counseling for eccentric coven members Desmond and Neptune, Percival and Rowena, and Angus and Echo. Thorn routinely pressures Willow with his desire to start a family, but Willow remains hesitant about having children.

On Thorn's computer, Willow finds emails inviting Thorn to his 20-year reunion at Desert Dunes High School. Willow is horrified to learn that Thorn was a wholesome conformist who was class president, prom king, and voted Most Likely to Succeed. Willow confronts Thorn for the truth about his past. Thorn admits that his estranged mother Ruth forced him into a mainstream lifestyle while his grandmother was the only person who truly understood his desire to be different. Although distraught by the revelation, Willow reconciles with Thorn. However, Willow reveals she RSVP'd for the reunion, which additionally means that, per tradition, Thorn will have to perform a dance at the event since he was class president.

Willow asks to meet Thorn's mother. Thorn calls Ruth, and Willow discovers how mean the woman is when she berates her son for his Wiccan beliefs and warns he will humiliate himself if he shows his high school classmates that he became a failure. Thorn reveals the truth about his high school days to the coven. Feeling betrayed, the coven votes to banish Thorn, so he goes on a walkabout at a Los Angeles park to reconsider his identity while Willow tries convincing the coven to forgive him.

While high on ayahuasca in the park, Thorn gets life advice from a seemingly sentient pinecone and a rock. A psychedelic vision of the wizard Merlin further motivates Thorn to assert agency over his life by dancing at the reunion. Thorn imagines a confrontation with an angry park ranger, but when he vanishes, the rock tells Thorn that the ranger was an imaginary invention of the ego dominating Thorn's mind. Thorn undergoes a psychological transformation in the restroom and emerges as a renewed man. Thorn then arranges a rideshare pool to travel to his hometown and discusses lasagna as a life metaphor with a fellow passenger on the way.

During Willow's discussion with the coven, Desmond finally joins her in vouching for Thorn's character. Desmond's courage causes his boyfriend Neptune to confess he is actually straight while telling Desmond he deserves a better man. Willow ultimately rallies the coven to support Thorn at the reunion so he doesn't have to do his dance alone. Upon arriving in his hometown, Thorn leaves a flaming bag of excrement on his mother's doorstep. At the reunion, Thorn has odd run-ins with former classmate Nicholas Reed as well as Thorn's former student government rival Alexandra Riley. Thorn delivers a strange speech prior to his ceremonial dance, but attendees merely roll their eyes and insult Thorn.

Thorn's confidence renews when Willow arrives with the apologetic coven and they pledge themselves to his leadership. Desmond makes an unexpected romantic connection with Nicholas. Rowena and Echo recruit Alexandra to join the coven. Thorn performs his dance. The dance arouses Willow so much that she immediately has sex with Thorn directly on the dance floor. The coven encircles the couple while reunion attendees leave in confused disgust. That night, Thorn leaves a voicemail for his mother to apologize for the flaming bag of poo and to invite Ruth and Thorn's grandmother to a lasagna dinner.

Twelve new moons later, Thorn and Willow decide their coven needs new leadership, so Alexandra becomes the new high priestess. Having shed their egos, Thorn and Willow commit to raising their newborn son Knight.

== Cast ==
- Matthew Gray Gubler as Thorn
- Angela Sarafyan as Willow
- Andy Milonakis as Percival
- Kate Comer as Rowena
- Josh Fadem as Neptune
- Johnny Pemberton as Desmond
- Nelson Franklin as Franklin
- Emily Chang as Echo
- Barbara Crampton as Ruth
- Ray Wise as Merlin
- Swati Kapila as Alexandra
- Shane Brady as Nicholas
- Ronnie Gene Blevins as Grant
- Alice Glass as Rock (voice)
- Aubrey Plaza as Pinecone (voice)

== Release ==
The film was shot in 2019 and had its world premiere at the Fantasia Film Festival on August 8, 2021. It was released in the United States in select theaters and on-demand on February 17, 2022, by XYZ Films.

== Reception ==
The review aggregator website Rotten Tomatoes has an approval rating of 73% based on 40 reviews, with an average rating of 6.2/10. The website's critics consensus reads, "King Knight's humor doesn't always land, but viewers who can pick up the movie's sweetly strange wavelength will be glad they tuned in." Chad Collins of Dread Central gave the film 4/5 and called it "uncommonly endearing."

Rosie Knight of Nerdist gave the film 2.5/5 and said the film "never fully finds itself."

== See also ==
- List of films about witchcraft
