= Lara Flynn Boyle =

American actress (born 1970)

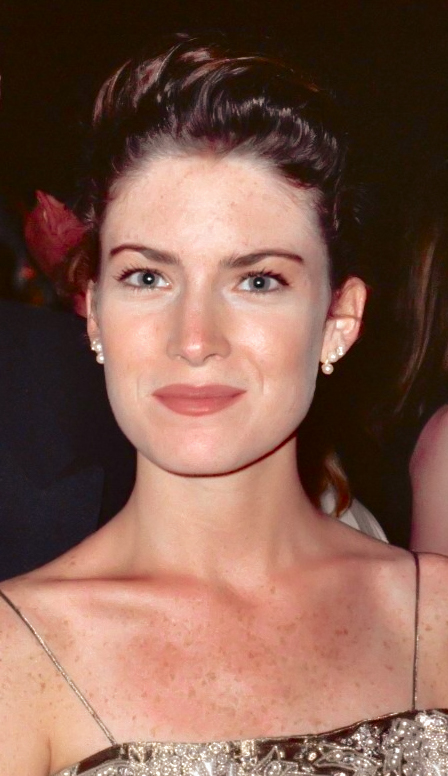
- Boyle at the 1990 Primetime Emmy Awards
- Born: March 24, 1970 (age 56); Davenport, Iowa, U.S.
- Occupation: Actress
- Years active: 1986–present
- Spouses: John Patrick Dee III (m. 1996; div. 1998); Donald Ray Thomas II (m. 2006)
- Relatives: Charles A. Boyle (grandfather)

Lara Flynn Boyle (born March 24, 1970) is an American actress. She is known for playing Donna Hayward in the television series Twin Peaks (1990–1991). After appearing in Penelope Spheeris's comedy Wayne's World (1992), Boyle had a lead role in John Dahl's neo-noir film Red Rock West (1993), and in the psychological thriller The Temp (1993), followed by roles in Threesome and Baby's Day Out (both in 1994), Cafe Society (1995), Happiness (1998), and the villainous Serleena in Men in Black II (2002). From 1997 to 2003, she starred in the ABC series The Practice, for which she received a Primetime Emmy Award nomination.

== Early life ==
Boyle was born in Davenport, Iowa, the daughter of Sally Flynn, a clerical worker, assistant, and manager, and Michael L. Boyle. Her paternal grandfather was U.S. Representative Charles A. Boyle. She has Irish, German, and Italian ancestry. She is named after a character in Boris Pasternak's novel Doctor Zhivago. Her father left when she was six, causing her and her mother to move to smaller quarters. Around this time, she was diagnosed with dyslexia. She was raised in Chicago, Illinois, and Wisconsin, and graduated from Chicago Academy for the Arts.

== Career ==
In 1986, Boyle landed a small part in John Hughes's teen comedy film Ferris Bueller's Day Off, which earned her a SAG card, though her scenes were deleted from the final cut of the film. Subsequently, Boyle had a supporting role as Jackie Bradford in the television miniseries Amerika, followed by guest appearances on episodes of the series Jack and Mike and Sable (all in 1987).

After a string of supporting roles, Boyle landed a lead role in the Gary Sherman horror film Poltergeist III (1988), which was distributed by the media company MGM. Although she was cast as Ginny Danburry in Peter Weir's drama film Dead Poets Society (1989), her scenes were ultimately deleted from the final cut.

Twin Peaks gave me everything I have as an actor. It put me where I am now because it was so beautifully soulful, and I think it just brought out the best of the actors. There was no acting going on – we were living on Twin Peaks. It gave me my career.

— Boyle discussing the impact Twin Peaks had on her career

In 1989, Boyle rose to international prominence when David Lynch cast her as Donna Hayward in the television series Twin Peaks (1990–1991). The series focused on the murder of the high school Homecoming Queen Laura Palmer, with Boyle portraying Laura's best friend. Her main storyline focused on her trying to solve the mystery of who killed Laura. The series premiered April 8, 1990, on ABC and subsequently became one of the top-rated series of 1990, but a decline in ratings ultimately led to its cancellation after its second season in 1991. Boyle appeared in all 30 episodes.

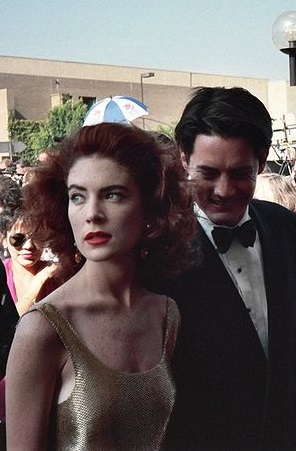
Boyle and Kyle MacLachlan arriving at the 43rd Primetime Emmy Awards in August 1991

When discussing Lynch's direction, Boyle stated, "I remember, in the pilot, I did a very long scene that we had to shoot 30 or 40 times. David came up to me and said quietly, in my ear: 'Think of how gently a deer has to move in the snow…' It was strange direction. But that's what I thought of, and it worked. We were at the helm of a piece of heaven on Twin Peaks and we just went where David Lynch told us. That might sound very obscure but it really is true. How he sees the world is how we should all see the world."

In October 1990, while promoting Twin Peaks, Boyle was featured on the cover of Rolling Stone magazine along with her co-stars Mädchen Amick and Sherilyn Fenn. While starring on Twin Peaks, Boyle portrayed Sarah in Clint Eastwood's action film The Rookie (1990), Rosarita in Adam Rifkin's satirical comedy film The Dark Backward (1991), Mara Motes in crime film Mobsters (1991), and Sandra Gladstone in the romantic thriller Eye of the Storm (1991). Boyle also appeared in the television films Terror on Highway 91 and The Preppie Murder (both in 1989), as well as episodes of The Hidden Room (1991) and May Wine.

Shortly after the cancellation of Twin Peaks, plans were being made for a feature film adaptation. Boyle was asked by Lynch to reprise her role as Donna Hayward in the psychological horror film Twin Peaks: Fire Walk with Me (1992) but she was unable to commit to the project due to scheduling conflicts with her roles as Heather in Marc Rocco's drama film Where the Day Takes You (alongside her Twin Peaks co-star Kyle MacLachlan), Stacy in Penelope Spheeris's comedy film Wayne's World, and Beverly Franks in Alan Rudolph's crime drama Equinox. This led to her being replaced by actress Moira Kelly. In 1993, Boyle starred as Kris Bolin in the thriller film The Temp and portrayed the temptress Suzanne Brown in the neo-noir film Red Rock West alongside Nicolas Cage and Dennis Hopper.

In 1994, Boyle was cast as Alex in the comedy Threesome, Laraine Cotwell in Baby's Day Out, and Ida Muntz in The Road to Wellville. That same year, Boyle appeared in the television films Past Tense and Jacob. In 1995, she was cast as Pat Ward in the mystery film Cafe Society. In 1997, she portrayed Marianne Byron in the film Afterglow. The following year, Boyle portrayed Helen Jordan in Todd Solondz’s controversial comedy-drama film Happiness.

Boyle auditioned for the title role in David E. Kelley's Ally McBeal. Although she lost out to Calista Flockhart, Boyle impressed Kelley enough to cast her in the role of Assistant District Attorney Helen Gamble in his other 1997 series, The Practice. She starred on The Practice until 2003, when, in a dramatic attempt to revamp the show and cut costs, she was dismissed along with most of the cast. For her performance as Helen Gamble, she received an Emmy nomination as well as several Screen Actors Guild ensemble cast nominations. Boyle also made a crossover appearance in the role of Helen Gamble in an episode of Ally McBeal, and an uncredited guest appearance on the same show in its final season.

In 2002, Boyle played a lead role in the blockbuster feature film Men in Black II, as the villainous shapeshifting alien Serleena. She also guest-starred on one of the last episodes of Ally McBeal, this time as Tally Cupp, and had a recurring role on several episodes of Huff.

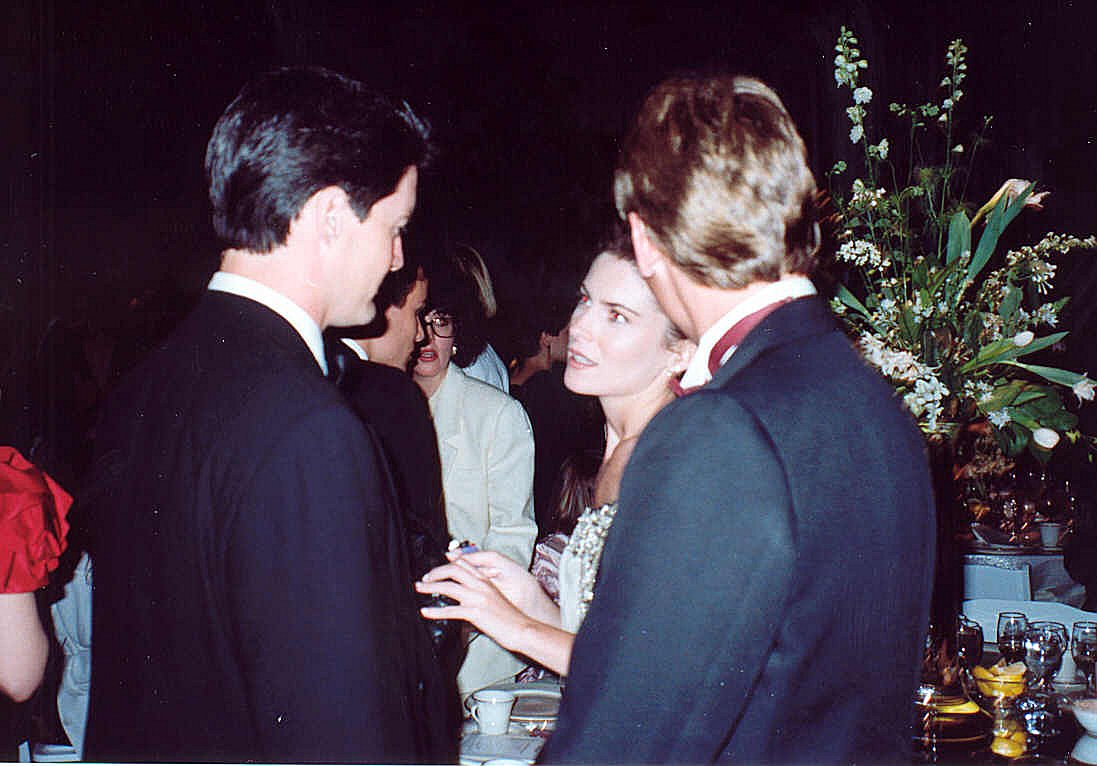
Boyle and Kyle MacLachlan at the Governor's Ball held immediately after the 1990 Emmy Awards

In 2005, Boyle joined the cast of Las Vegas for a seven-episode stint as Monica Mancuso, a new hotel owner. She played Barbara Amiel in the television film Shades of Black: The Conrad Black Story, about Amiel and her husband, Conrad Black. Boyle also guest-starred as an ambitious reporter involved with the suspects in a possible murder in the Law & Order 2008 episode "Submission".

In 2009, Boyle portrayed Mary in Baby on Board. The same year, Boyle was cast as Betty McBain in the independent film Life Is Hot in Cracktown. In 2010, she starred as Kathy in Cougar Hunting. In 2013, Boyle portrayed Witch Agnes in the horror comedy film Hansel & Gretel Get Baked. In 2015, she portrayed Ms. Donley in the film Lucky Dog.

In 2020, after a five-year break, she returned to acting to star as Grace in the film Death in Texas alongside Ronnie Gene Blevins, Bruce Dern, and Stephen Lang.

== Personal life ==
Boyle dated her Twin Peaks co-star Kyle MacLachlan from 1990 until 1992, and was married to John Patrick Dee III from 1996 to 1998. She then dated comedian David Spade, whom she left for actor Jack Nicholson after Nicholson asked her out in front of Spade while the three were smoking weed together; Boyle was 29 and Nicholson was 62 at the time, and Spade later found out they were together from a paparazzi report on a car crash they were in. Boyle and Nicholson went public with their romance at the 1999 Emmy Awards ceremony and reportedly split up in late 2000. On December 18, 2006, Boyle married real estate investor Donald Ray Thomas II in San Antonio, Texas.

== Filmography ==
=== Film ===
Year	Title	Role	Notes
1986	Ferris Bueller's Day Off	Heather	Deleted scenes
1988	Poltergeist III	Donna Gardner	
1989	How I Got into College	Jessica Kailo	
1989	Dead Poets Society	Ginny Danburry	Deleted scenes
1990	The Rookie	Sarah Ackerman	
1991	The Dark Backward	Rosarita	
1991	Mobsters	Mara Motes	
1991	Eye of the Storm	Sandra Gladstone	
1992	Where the Day Takes You	Heather	
1992	Wayne's World	Stacy	
1992	Equinox	Beverly Franks	Nominated—Independent Spirit Award for Best Supporting Female
1993	The Temp	Kris Bolin	
1993	Red Rock West	Ann McCord / Suzanne Brown	
1994	Threesome	Alex	
1994	Baby's Day Out	Laraine Cotwell	
1994	The Road to Wellville	Ida Muntz	
1995	Cafe Society	Pat Ward	
1996	The Big Squeeze	Tanya Mulhill	
1997	Farmer & Chase	Hillary	
1997	Red Meat	Ruth	
1997	Afterglow	Marianne Byron	
1997	Cannes Man	Herself	
1998	Happiness	Helen Jordan	
1998	Susan's Plan	Betty Johnson	
2000	Chain of Fools	Karen	
2001	Speaking of Sex	Emily Paige	
2002	Men in Black II	Serleena	Nominated—Golden Raspberry Award for Worst Supporting Actress
2006	Land of the Blind	First Lady	
2006	Fwiends.com	Yuppie girl	Short film
2007	Have Dreams, Will Travel	Ben's Mother	
2009	Baby on Board	Mary Radcliffe	
2009	Life Is Hot in Cracktown	Betty McBain	
2010	Cougar Hunting	Kathy	
2013	Hansel & Gretel Get Baked	Witch Agnes	Also associate producer
2015	Lucky Dog	Ms. Donley	
2020	Death in Texas	Grace	
2023	Mother, Couch	Linda	

=== Television ===
Year	Title	Role	Notes
1987	Jack and Mike	Leslie	Episode: "Quality of Mercy"
1987	Amerika	Jackie Bradford	5 episodes
1987	Sable	Melanie Waterston	Episode: "Toy Gun"
1989	Terror on Highway 91	Laura Taggart	Television film
1989	The Preppie Murder	Jennifer Levin	Television film
1990–1991	Twin Peaks	Donna Hayward	30 episodes
1991	The Hidden Room	Nicole	Episode: "Splinters of Privacy"
1991	May Wine	Cammie	Television film
1994	Past Tense	Tory Bass / Sabrina James	Television film
1994	Jacob	Rachel	Television film
1995	Legend	Theresa Dunleavy	Episode: "Skeletons in the Closet"
1997–2003	The Practice	Helen Gamble	116 episodes Nominated—Primetime Emmy Award for Outstanding Supporting Actress in a Drama Series; Nominated—Screen Actors Guild Award for Outstanding Performance by an Ensemble in a Drama Series (1999–2001)
1998	Ally McBeal	Helen Gamble	Episode: "Making Spirits Bright"
1998	Since You've Been Gone	Grace Williams	Television film
2002	Ally McBeal	Tally Cupp	Episode: "Tom Dooley"
2004–2005	Huff	Melody Coatar	5 episodes
2005–2006	Las Vegas	Monica Mancuso	8 episodes
2006	The House Next Door	Col Kennedy	Television film
2006	Shades of Black: The Conrad Black Story	Barbara Amiel	Television film
2008	Law & Order	Dawn Talley	Episode: "Submission"
