= Johnny Pemberton =

American comedian and actor (b. 1981)

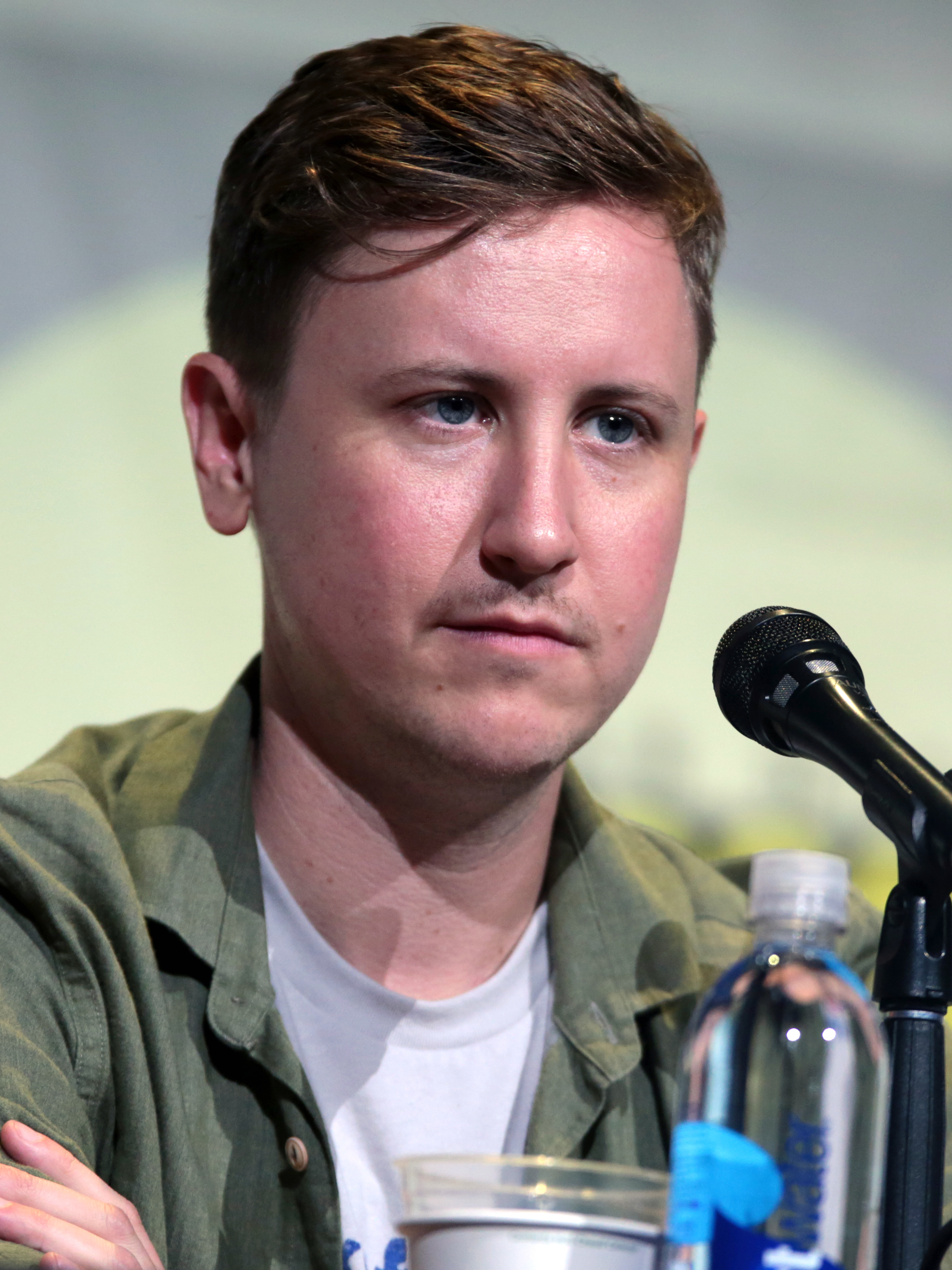
- Pemberton at the 2016 San Diego Comic-Con
- Born: John DeJarnette Pemberton; June 1, 1981 (age 45); Rochester, Minnesota, U.S.
- Occupations: Actor; comedian; podcast host
- Years active: 2007–present
- Spouse: Britt Pemberton
- Website: johnnypemberton.dog

John DeJarnette Pemberton (born June 1, 1981) is an American actor and comedian. He is best known for his roles as Alangulon ("Alan") on the Fox sitcom Son of Zorn, Thaddeus in the Prime Video drama series Fallout, Peanut in the Disney XD series Pickle and Peanut.

== Life and career ==
Pemberton was born on June 1, 1981 in Rochester, Minnesota. He was named after his great-grandfather. His father John, his grandfather and great-grandfather were all Mayo Clinic-trained surgeons. His mother, Elise, is a former nurse who became a stay-at-home mom. Pemberton has a younger brother and two younger sisters. He is of Welsh descent.

Pemberton grew up in Rochester, attending Bamber Valley Elementary School, Folwell Elementary School, St. John the Evangelist Catholic School, and Lourdes High School. As a child, Pemberton was diagnosed with ulcerative colitis, which stunted his growth. He went into remission around age 20. Because the illness left him looking young, he was able to play roles much younger than his age.

After high school, Pemberton went on to Florida State University, graduating in 2003. He worked at a record store for a few months in Tallahassee before moving back to Rochester. In January 2005, he moved to Los Angeles after getting a viral marketing position at Fox Broadcasting. He worked his way up to better roles such as web production and did online interviews with Fox personalities. He also started doing stand-up comedy and taking classes at Upright Citizens Brigade.

After more than two years at Fox, Pemberton was laid off. He got a job as a once-a-week DJ at a bar and worked on comedic videos and an Internet series. He booked small roles on the Starz series Hollywood Residential and commercials for Honda, Best Buy and Gillette.

Pemberton was the host of an audio podcast called Live to Tape on Starburns Audio (formerly the Feral Audio Network).

== Personal life ==
Pemberton is married to Britt Pemberton.

== Filmography ==
=== Film ===
Year	Title	Role
2009	In the Loop	A.J. Brown
2011	Let Go	Preppy Kid
2012	Dream World	Richard
2012	21 Jump Street	Delroy
2012	The Watch	Skater Kid
2012	This Is 40	Room Service Waiter (Kelly)
2014	22 Jump Street	Delroy
2014	Jason Nash Is Married	Desk Guy
2015	Band of Robbers	Tommy Barnes
2015	Ant-Man	Ice Cream Store Customer
2016	The 4th	Scotty
2016	Neighbors 2: Sorority Rising	Frat President
2017	The Night Is Young	Darren
2018	Action Point	Ziffel
2018	Living Room Coffin	Peter
2019	Headlock	Scotty
2019	Tone-Deaf	Uriah
2021	King Knight	Desmond
2022	Unplugging	Tim
2022	Weird: The Al Yankovic Story	Johnny Barf
2024	Future Date	Dallas
2025	Mermaid	Doug

=== Television ===
Year	Title	Role	Notes
2010	It's Always Sunny in Philadelphia	Craig	2 episodes
2013	Bob's Burgers	Dr. Eigerman (voice)	Episode: "The Kids Run the Restaurant"
2013	New Girl	Prom Date	Episode: "Virgins"
2013	Adventure Time	Braco (voice)	Episode: "The Suitor"
2013	Perception	Imaginary Fanboy	Episode: "Alienation"
2013	Family Tools	Mason Baumgardner	Main role
2013–2015	Kroll Show	Johnny / Cameron / Kevin	Recurring role
2015	Community	Assistant	Episode: "Queer Studies and Advanced Waxing"
2015	Review	Tim	Episode: "Curing Homosexuality, Mile High Club"
2015	Fresh Off the Boat	Clark	Episode: "Shaquille O'Neal Motors"
2015–2018	Pickle and Peanut	Peanut (voice)	Main role
2015–2021	Superstore	Bo Thompson	Recurring role
2016–2017	Son of Zorn	Alangulon ("Alan") Bennett	Main role
2017	You're the Worst	Max	Recurring role, season 4
2018	I Feel Bad	Griff	Main role
2019	Just Roll with It	Lil Pouty	3 episodes
2019	Drinks of My Life	Himself	Episode:"Johnny Pemberton"
2020	The Midnight Gospel	Cornelius / Fred / Steve / Billix French Jr. / President's Aid	Episodes: "Blinded By My End", "Taste of the King"
2020	Corporate	Donovan	Episode: "Pickles 4 Breakfast"
2021–2022	Middlemost Post	Ryan	Recurring role
2021	Law & Order: Special Victims Unit	Travis Hillsdale	Episode: "One More Tale of Two Victims"
2024–present	Fallout	Thaddeus	Recurring role
2025	Bad Thoughts	Barry	Episode: "Health"
2025	StuGo	Peanut (voice)	Episode: "Alpha Betta Chip"
2025	The Lowdown	Berta	4 episodes
2025	It's Florida, Man	Jared	Episode: "Speedy"
2026	Adventure Time: Side Quests	Zeus	Episode: “Sunshine Kingdom”

=== Web ===
Year	Title	Role	Notes
2009–2010	Gigabots	Phoenix Stryker	Main role
2011	Aim High	Marcus Anderson	Main role
2013	Poundhouse	Johnny	Recurring role
2015	High In Church	Brian	Music Video
