= Tone-Deaf =

- Film poster
- Directed by: Richard Bates Jr.
- Written by: Richard Bates Jr.
- Produced by: Lawrence Mattis; Brad Mendelsohn; Matt Smith; Brion Hambel; Paul Jensen
- Starring: Robert Patrick; Amanda Crew; Ronnie Gene Blevins; Hayley Marie Norman; Johnny Pemberton; Kim Delaney; Ray Wise
- Cinematography: Ed Wu
- Edited by: Yvonne Valdez
- Music by: Michl Britsch
- Production companies: Lightning Entertainment; Circle of Confusion; Best Medicine; Hindsight Media Services; Enigma Film Prod.
- Distributed by: Saban Films
- Release dates: March 2019 (South by Southwest); August 23, 2019 (limited)
- Running time: 87 minutes
- Country: United States
- Language: English

Tone-Deaf is a 2019 American comedy horror film written and directed by Richard Bates Jr. and starring Robert Patrick and Amanda Crew with Ronnie Gene Blevins, Hayley Marie Norman, Johnny Pemberton, Kim Delaney and Ray Wise. Patrick also served as one of the executive producers of the film.

== Plot ==
As a little girl, Olive Smith performs a piano recital. Olive's parents miss the performance when her depressed father Michael hangs himself following an argument with Olive's mother Crystal. As an adult, Olive breaks up with her difficult boyfriend York. Olive's friends Lenore and Blaire console Olive after her sexist boss Asher fires her too. Olive plays a keyboard for her friends, who tell her she is great even though she is tone deaf. Olive sees a frightening vision of her father in front of the urn holding his ashes. Olive calls her mother Crystal, who lives in a hippie commune, about the incident. Crystal mentions that Michael wanted his ashes scattered into space. Crystal also recommends that her daughter clear her head by getting away for the weekend. Olive has another haunting vision of her dead father when York comes by with his new girlfriend to pick up his things.

Through Airbnb, widower Harvey Parker rents his remote house to Olive for the weekend. Harvey rants to himself about millennials while mourning at his wife Edith's homemade grave. Olive meets Harvey's family friend Agnes, who later asks Harvey why he is renting out his house. Harvey takes Agnes captive by tying her to a bed in his cabin down the road. Olive plays Harvey's piano for her mother over the phone. Harvey sees a vision of his dead wife slitting her throat with a letter opener at the piano while secretly watching Olive play. Harvey tells Agnes that his estranged son David thinks Harvey has dementia and wants to put him in a home. Harvey reveals that he wants to know what it feels like to kill someone, which is why he set up Olive in his house. Harvey regrets that he has to kill Agnes too because she interfered.

Harvey is unable to kill Olive while she sleeps. Harvey hears Edith's voice telling him to stop. Harvey puts a spider in Olive's contact lens case. Fellow commune member Uriah professes his attraction to Crystal. Crystal allows Uriah to go down on her while she texts Olive. Harvey returns to Agnes. Agnes angers Harvey by claiming he trapped his wife in their marriage by lording custody of their son over Edith. Harvey suddenly stabs Agnes to death. Unaware that Olive rented the house, David comes by to pick up his prototypes for a Shark Tank pitch. Startled by his unannounced appearance, Olive compels David to leave.

Harvey follows Olive to The Cowboy Palace Saloon where she meets her Tinder date James. A news bulletin on TV reports on a missing woman. Harvey sees James secretly drug Olive's rum and Coke, but Olive doesn't drink it. Olive instead invites James to join her at the house for dinner later. Harvey follows James back to his nearby motel room. Harvey murders James with a hammer. Harvey finds a captive woman in James’ closet and kills her too. Olive buys LSD from the attendant at a makeshift car wash. While tripping back at the house, Olive sees visions of various ex-boyfriends before her father finally appears to her. Michael talks about Crystal and his depression before urging his daughter to choose better boyfriends and get rid of his ashes. Michael adds that Olive is great at playing piano. York calls to tell Olive that he made a mistake and wants her back. Olive hangs up on him.

Harvey murders a homeless man on his way to the house. Harvey cuts the house's power, crushes Olive's glasses, and lays boards spiked with nails on the staircase. Harvey wakes Olive by loudly playing the radio. Frightened, Olive texts her mother for help before her phone goes dead. Seeing an opportunity to make things right with Olive, Crystal drives to the house with Uriah. Their car gets a flat tire on the way, but David stops to help them fix it. Olive arms herself with the letter opener Edith used to commit suicide. The spider bites Olive when she tries putting in her contacts. Harvey calls Olive downstairs. Unable to see, Olive steps on one of the nails. Olive stabs Harvey with the letter opener when he attacks. Olive tries to hide, but Harvey crushes her foot and knocks her unconscious.

Olive recovers to find that Harvey dressed her in Edith's clothes and seated her at the piano. Harvey forces Olive to play like his wife used to do. Harvey hears Edith's voice and sees a vision of Edith as a ghoul. Harvey smashes the piano with a tomahawk when he realizes Olive is tone deaf, which Olive never knew. Crystal and Uriah arrive at the house. Harvey kills Uriah. Crystal shoots Harvey to the ground, although she accidentally shoots her daughter too. Olive kills Harvey by stabbing him with the letter opener. Crystal tells Olive that she is terrible at playing piano and now realizes it was wrong to falsely encourage her. Olive curses baby boomers and calls 911 for an ambulance. David later surveys the crime scene with his boyfriend. Olive and Crystal try scattering Michael's ashes using a toy rocket that falls limply to the ground. The women walk away confident that Michael would have appreciated the effort anyway.

== Cast ==
- Amanda Crew as Olive Smith, Michael's daughter
- Robert Patrick as Harvey Parker
- Ronnie Gene Blevins as David
- Hayley Marie Norman as Lenore
- Kim Delaney as Crystal Smith, Olive's mother
- Johnny Pemberton as Uriah
- Nancy Linehan Charles as Agnes
- AnnaLynne McCord as Blaire
- Keisha Castle-Hughes as Wyatt
- Ray Wise as Michael Smith, Olive's dad
- Tate Ellington as James
- Danny Ramirez as Rodrigo

== Production ==
In April 2018, it was announced that Crew and Patrick were cast in the film.

According to Bates, the idea of the film was based on Norman Rockwell's 1962 painting, The Connoisseur.

The Piru Mansion was shown in the film.

== Release ==
The film had its world premiere in March 2019 at the South by Southwest film festival. Prior to its premiere, Saban Films acquired North American distribution rights. The film was released in limited theaters and video-on-demand on August 23, 2019.

== Reception ==
The film has a 44% rating on Rotten Tomatoes, based on 32 reviews. The site's consensus reads, "A messy horror-comedy hybrid that makes poor use of a talented cast, Tone-Deaf aims for social commentary, but tumbles down the generation gap." Simon Abrams of RogerEbert.com awarded the film one star.
