= Band of Robbers =

- Theatrical release poster
- Directed by: Aaron Nee; Adam Nee
- Written by: Aaron Nee; Adam Nee
- Based on: The Adventures of Huckleberry Finn and The Adventures of Tom Sawyer by Mark Twain
- Produced by: John Will; Rick Rosenthal; Matt Ratner; Arun Kumar
- Starring: Kyle Gallner; Adam Nee; Matthew Gray Gubler; Melissa Benoist; Daniel Edward Mora; Eric Christian Olsen; Hannibal Buress; Stephen Lang
- Cinematography: Noah Rosenthal
- Edited by: Aaron Nee; Adam Nee
- Music by: Joel P. West
- Production company: Torn Sky Entertainment
- Distributed by: Gravitas Ventures
- Release dates: June 13, 2015 (LA Film Festival); January 15, 2016 (United States)
- Running time: 95 minutes
- Country: United States
- Language: English
- Box office: $20,555

Band of Robbers is a 2015 American crime comedy film written and directed by brothers Aaron and Adam Nee, based on Mark Twain's The Adventures of Huckleberry Finn and The Adventures of Tom Sawyer. It stars Kyle Gallner as Huck Finn and Adam Nee as Tom Sawyer. Matthew Gray Gubler, Melissa Benoist, Daniel Edward Mora, Eric Christian Olsen, Hannibal Buress, and Stephen Lang also star.

In this modern-day retelling, the two iconic rascals are grown up and small-time crooks still searching for the fabled Murrell's treasure that has eluded them since childhood. The story draws heavily from Twain's classic novels, including characters, plot twists and even dialogue.

Band of Robbers premiered at the 2015 LA Film Festival, and received a limited theatrical release in the United States on January 15, 2016, by Gravitas Ventures.

== Plot ==
When a man named Huck Finn is released from jail he is greeted by his lifelong friend, Tom Sawyer, now an underachieving cop who just cannot let go of their childhood dreams of wealth and glory. Tom convinces the reluctant Huck and their bumbling friends Joe Harper and Ben Rogers to rob a pawnshop where their friend and contact, the alcoholic vagrant Muff Potter, believes Injun Joe, a savage and murderous white career criminal who admires and appropriates Native American culture, has hidden Murrell's treasure. Tom explains that robbing bad guys makes them the good guys. Things get complicated when Tom's commander assigns him to train Becky Thatcher, an eager-to-please rookie partner, and the hung-over band of robbers' heist goes awry. But that does not stop Tom; instead, he leads the band on a wild treasure hunt from one mysterious clue to another. When Huck's friend, Mexican day laborer Jorge Jimenez, is mistaken as part of the band's activities and arrested, Huck and Tom, on the run from a vengeful Injun Joe and the police, lead the band on a mission to rescue him and be "heroes".

== Cast ==
- Kyle Gallner as Huck Finn
  - Gabriel Bateman as Young Huck
- Adam Nee as Tom Sawyer
  - Willem Miller as Young Tom
- Matthew Gray Gubler as Joe Harper
- Hannibal Buress as Ben Rogers
- Melissa Benoist as Officer Becky Thatcher
- Daniel Edward Mora as Jorge Jimenez aka Jim
- Stephen Lang as Injun Joe
- Eric Christian Olsen as Det. Sid Sawyer
- Johnny Pemberton as Tommy Barnes
- Beth Grant as Widow Douglas
- Cooper Huckabee as Muff Potter
- Lee Garlington as Lt. Polly
- Creed Bratton as Dobbins
- Josh Harp as Packard
- Jack Wallace as Doc Robinson
- Maria Blasucci as Amy Lawrence
- Brian Sacca as Det. Temple
- Jeff Newburg as Pap Finn

== Release ==
The world premiere of Band of Robbers was held at the 2015 LA Film Festival on June 13, 2015. The film was picked up for distribution by Gravitas Ventures, and had a limited release on January 15, 2016 in theaters in 11 cities.

== Reception ==
Band of Robbers received generally positive reviews from The New York Times, Variety, and The Cleveland Plain Dealer. On review aggregator Rotten Tomatoes, the film holds an approval rating of 78% based on 27 reviews, with an average rating of 6.51/10. It has drawn comparisons to the films of Wes Anderson, particularly Bottle Rocket, and the Coen brothers.

It won the Director's Choice Award at the Naples International Film Festival.
