= Hayley Marie Norman =

American actress

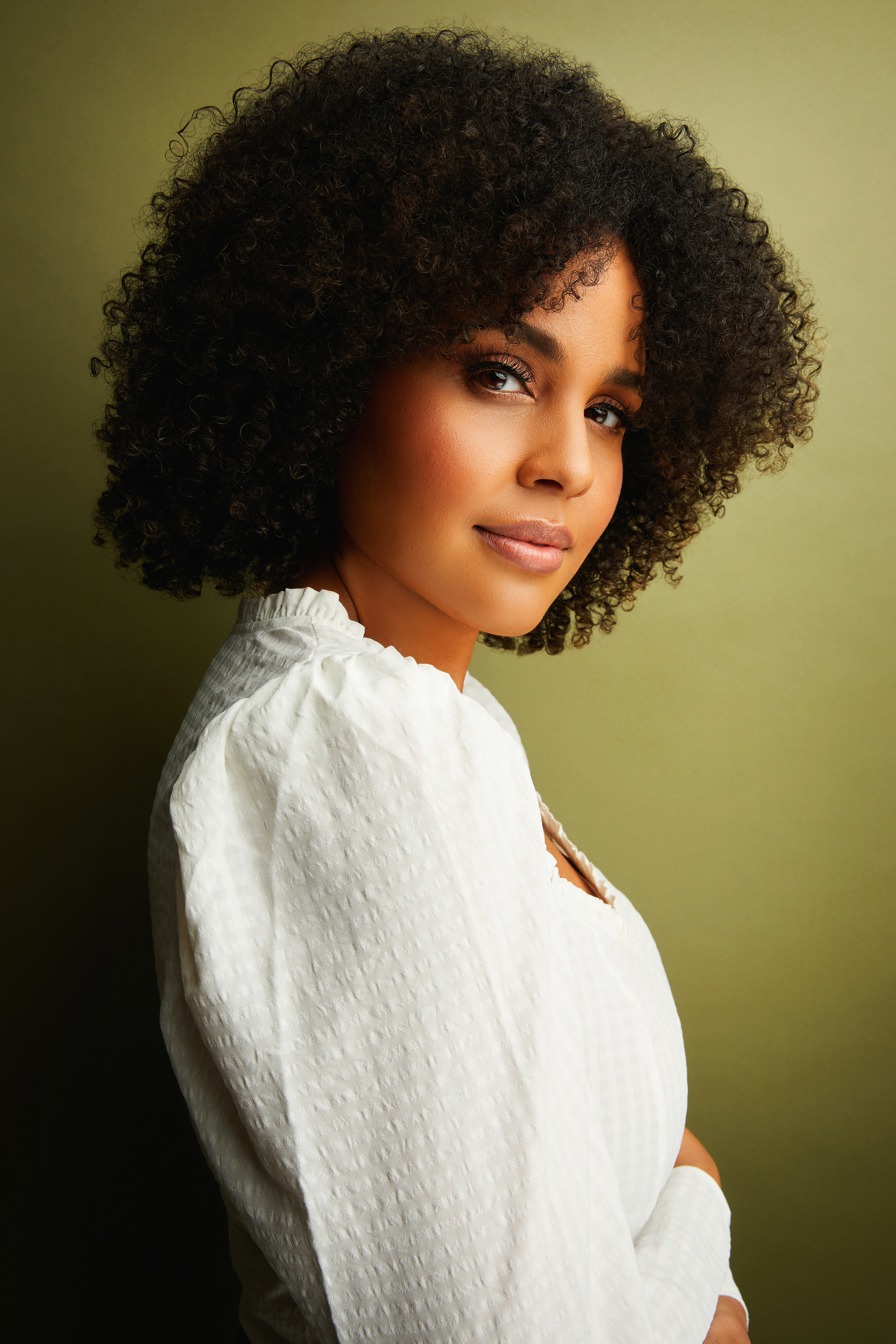
- Norman in 2021
- Education: American Academy of Dramatic Arts
- Occupations: Actress, writer, producer, model
- Years active: 2006–present

Hayley Marie Norman is an American actress, writer, and creator known for her roles in Kenan, A.P. Bio, Hancock, Chris Rock's Top Five, Adam Ruins Everything, Fired Up!, and Norbit.

Norman has written, produced, and starred in a number of online videos and sketches that have been featured by Funny or Die. The digital series she produced and starred in, Hello Cupid, was accepted into Tribeca Film Festival and picked up by BET in 2015.

== Early life ==
Norman signed with her first modeling agency at seven years old after being spotted in a restaurant by Cindy Crawford. She traveled to pursue acting and modeling, including for Mattel, doing a series of ads for the African-American Barbie doll.

Norman graduated from the American Academy of Dramatic Arts in Los Angeles. She was also a house team performer and writer at the Upright Citizens Brigade Theater.

== Career ==
=== 2006–2010 ===
In 2006, Norman joined the game show Deal or No Deal as Case Model #25. She remained on the show for three seasons while taking time off to act in various projects, including roles in Norbit and Hancock.

In 2008, she had a recurring role on the Starz original series Crash. The following year, Norman appeared in the Screen Gems high school comedy Fired Up, for which Roger Ebert praised her performance as Angela, stating that she was "the most intriguing member of the cast".

=== 2011–2016 ===
In 2011, Norman made guest star appearances on shows like CSI: Miami.

In 2014, Norman acted in two feature films, Top Five and Beyond the Lights, that premiered at the 2014 Toronto International Film Festival.

Hello Cupid, the web series that Norman produced and starred in, was accepted into Tribeca Film Festival in 2015. A semi-scripted series from Black&Sexy TV, it drew largely from Norman's improv and comedy skills and was spotlighted by Vulture and Teen Vogue.

Norman also starred in the Das Racist music video for "Girl" in 2012.

=== 2017–present ===
In 2018, she had a recurring role on the Freeform series Alone Together and appeared in the CBS sitcom Living Biblically.

In February 2018, Norman booked a series regular role in the CW pilot Dead Inside from executive producer Bill Lawrence.

In August 2018, Norman was asked to join the cast of NBC Universal's Access Live and Access Hollywood as a special guest host.

In 2019, she starred in the Richard Bates, Jr. film Tone-Deaf, which premiered at SXSW, which also starred Amanda Crew and Robert Patrick.

In 2021, it was announced that Norman will be a recurring cast member on the hit Peacock sitcom A.P. Bio.

In 2021, it was announced that Norman had joined the cast of NBC's Kenan, playing opposite Kenan Thompson.

In April 2023, it was announced that Honeycomb, a project in which Norman stars, would make its NYC premiere at the Tribeca Film Festival.

Also in 2023, Norman began hosting the podcast Datemare With Hayley Marie Norman, which takes a comedic look at her life dating after divorce.

== Activism ==
Norman has toured the United States as part of the Black History Mobile Museum speaking about gender, race, and Hollywood. Norman also works with a number of organizations to promote veganism and cruelty-free living.

== Selected filmography ==
=== Film ===
| Year | Title | Role | Notes |
|---|---|---|---|
| 2007 | Norbit | Ex-Wife | |
| 2008 | Hancock | Hottie | |
| 2008 | Broken Windows | Benny | |
| 2008 | Trailer Park of Terror | Amber | |
| 2009 | Fired Up! | Angela | |
| 2010 | Our Family Wedding | Sienna | |
| 2010 | Jelly | Penelope Woods | |
| 2011 | Dorfman in Love | Chelsea | |
| 2014 | Beyond the Lights | Shai | |
| 2014 | Top Five | Tammy | |
| 2016 | Do Over | Sharise Olechinsky | |
| 2018 | It's a Party | Caroline Rose | |
| 2018 | Electric Love | Sarah | |
| 2019 | Tone-Deaf | Lenore | |

=== Television ===
| Year | Title | Role | Notes |
|---|---|---|---|
| 2006–2008 | Deal or No Deal | Case Model #25 | Seasons 2-4 |
| 2008 | Crash | Justice | Episodes: "Railroaded" and "Los Muertos" |
| 2010 | CSI: NY | Tracy | Episode: "Shop Till You Drop" |
| 2011 | New Girl | Hot Hostess | Episode: "Pilot" |
| 2011 | CSI: Miami | Olivia Adler | Episode: "Wheels Up" |
| 2012 | Common Law | Kyla | Episode: "Performance Anxiety" |
| 2012 | The Exes | Amy | Episode: "Analyze Them" |
| 2012–2015 | The Game | Bianca | Episodes: "Catfight on the Catwalk" and "Sexual Healing" |
| 2013 | The Soul Man | Tonya | Episode: "Love Thy Neighbor" |
| 2013 | The Glades | Josie Cruz | Episode: "Glade-iators!" |
| 2013 | How to Live with Your Parents (For the Rest of Your Life) | Dashwanda | Episode: "How to Not Waste Money" |
| 2013 | Bones | Kristy Mineta | Episode: "The Party in the Pants" |
| 2015 | Adam Ruins Everything | Hayley | Recurring role, 5 episodes |
| 2015–2016 | Comedy Bang! Bang! | Regina/Isobel | 2 episodes |
| 2016, 2018–2019 | Lonely and Horny | Marissa | 8 episodes |
| 2016 | iZombie | Bailey Barker | Episode: "Reflections of the Way Liv Used to Be" |
| 2018 | Dead Inside | Jayla | Episode: "Pilot" |
| 2018 | Living Biblically | Debbie | Episode; "Let Us Pray" |
| 2018 | Alone Together | Clara | Episodes: "Pilot" and "The Big One" |
| 2019 | I Am the Night | Amber | Episode: "Dark Flower" |
| 2021 | The Upshaws | Kyla | Episode: "The Hook-Up" |
| 2021 | A.P. Bio | Shayla | Recurring role, 4 episodes (season 4) |
| 2021 | Kenan | Janay Brooks | Recurring role, 4 episodes |
| 2021 | Studio Killers 404 | Cherry, Jenny (voice) | TV Pilot |
| 2024 | Game Changer | Herself | Episode: "Second Place" |
