= Hanna R. Hall =

American actress

- Born: Hanna Rose Hall; July 9, 1984 (age 42); Denver, Colorado, U.S.
- Other name: Hanna Hall
- Education: Vancouver Film School
- Occupation: Actress
- Years active: 1993–present

Hanna Rose Hall (born July 9, 1984) is an American actress. She made her film debut in Forrest Gump (1994), and later appeared in Sofia Coppola's The Virgin Suicides (1999) and Rob Zombie's Halloween (2007).

== Early life ==
Hall was born in Denver, Colorado. Her family moved into the mountains when she was two years old, and she remained in Colorado until age eighteen. After high school, she lived in Hawaii and Los Angeles before moving to Vancouver, British Columbia, where she attended the Vancouver Film School.

== Career ==
When she was seven years old, Hall attended Nina Axelrod's open casting call for Robert Zemeckis's Forrest Gump. A few callbacks later, Hall was eventually cast as young Jenny Curran. This was followed by a role as an orphaned child in the 1996 television film Homecoming, co-starring Anne Bancroft.

Hall screen tested for the role of Lux Lisbon in Sofia Coppola's film adaptation of The Virgin Suicides, but was considered too young for the part so she was cast as Cecilia Lisbon instead. She appeared in several independent films following this, before being cast in Rob Zombie's remake of Halloween (2007) as Judith Myers. In 2009, she appeared in the independent comedy American Cowslip (2009), opposite Val Kilmer, Diane Ladd, and Cloris Leachman.

In 2012, Hall began working as a feline behavior specialist in Venice, California, directing underground plays. She has also appeared on television series, including guest roles on Criminal Minds and Masters of Sex.

== Filmography ==
=== Film ===
Year	Title	Role	Notes
1994	Forrest Gump	Young Jenny Curran	
1996	Homecoming	Maybeth Tillerman	
1999	The Virgin Suicides	Cecilia Lisbon	
2007	Halloween	Judith Myers	
2007	The Truth About Faces	Jules Whitfield	Short film
2009	American Cowslip	Georgia	
2010	Happiness Runs	Becky	
2010	Radio Free Albemuth	Vivian Kaplan	
2017	Another Skin	Doctor Cynthia Dorsett	Short film
2022	Forgotten	Becky Comfort	

=== Television ===
Year	Title	Role	Notes
2001	Amy & Isabelle	Amy Goodrow	TV film
2006	Standoff	Rose Anders	"Man of Steele"
2012	Criminal Minds	Connie Foster	"The Lesson"
2015	Masters of Sex	Linda Einhorn	"Parliament of Owls"
2019	The Purge	Medical Student	"7:01 A.M."
