= Squealer (2023 film) =

- Film poster
- Directed by: Andy Armstrong
- Written by: Andy Armstrong; Danielle Burgio
- Produced by: Jason Armstrong; Stephen Morgenstern; Cameron Goodrich; Rob Goodrich
- Starring: Wes Chatham; Ronnie Gene Blevins; Katherine Moennig; Graham Greene; Theo Rossi; Tyrese Gibson
- Cinematography: Kevin Ward; Dean Mitchell
- Edited by: Jamieson Tabb
- Music by: Julien Knafo
- Distributed by: Lionsgate Films
- Release date: November 3, 2023
- Running time: 99 minutes
- Country: United States
- Language: English

Squealer is a 2023 American horror thriller film, co-written, produced, and directed by Andy Armstrong. It stars Wes Chatham, Ronnie Gene Blevins, Katherine Moennig, Graham Greene, Theo Rossi, and Tyrese Gibson. It was released on November 3, 2023. Barry Hertz of The Globe and Mail wrote that the film "appears to be inspired by the crimes of Canadian murderer Robert Pickton."

== Premise ==
Young women are disappearing in a small town. A social worker and a police officer follow clues to a swine farm.

== Cast ==
- Wes Chatham as Jack
- Ronnie Gene Blevins as Theodore ("Squealer")
- Katherine Moennig as Earline
- Graham Greene as Joe
- Theo Rossi as Danny D.
- Tyrese Gibson as Officer Paul

== Production ==
In May 2022, it was announced Andy Armstrong would make his directorial debut with Squealer from a screenplay co-written by Armstrong and Danielle Burgio. Prior to release, the film used the working title The Pig Farmer.
