= Death in Texas =

- Directed by: Scott Windhauser
- Written by: Scott Windhauser
- Produced by: Tony Adler; Brandon Menchen; Ronnie Gene Blevins; Andrew Godbold
- Starring: Ronnie Gene Blevins; Bruce Dern; Lara Flynn Boyle; Stephen Lang
- Cinematography: Jonathan Hall
- Edited by: Mike Hugo
- Music by: Vince Emmett
- Production companies: Bradtone Films; Ahuevo Films
- Distributed by: Vertical Entertainment
- Release dates: November 2020 (Rockport); June 4, 2021 (United States)
- Country: United States
- Language: English

Death in Texas is a 2020 American action film written and directed by Scott Windhauser. It stars Ronnie Gene Blevins, Bruce Dern, Lara Flynn Boyle, and Stephen Lang.

== Cast ==
- Bruce Dern as Reynolds
- Ronnie Gene Blevins as Billy Walker
- Lara Flynn Boyle as Grace
- Stephen Lang as John
- John Ashton as Asher
- William Shockley as "Tex"

== Production ==
The film was shot in El Paso, Texas and Las Cruces, New Mexico from October to November 2019.

== Release ==
The film premiered at the 14th Rockport Film Festival in Rockport, Texas in November 2020.
