= William Shockley (actor) =

American actor and musician (born 1963)

- Born: September 17, 1963 (age 62); Lawrence, Kansas, US
- Occupations: Actor; musician

William Shockley (born September 17, 1963) is an American actor, musician, and director.

He was born in Lawrence, Kansas. He graduated from Texas Tech University with a degree in political science. He has appeared mainly in TV series; he is best known for his role as Hank Lawson on Dr. Quinn, Medicine Woman. He wrote and directed the 2025 American western thriller film Long Shadows.

== Filmography ==
=== Film ===
Year	Title	Role
1987	RoboCop	Creep
1989	Howling V: The Rebirth	Richard
1990	Street Asylum	"Tattoo"
1990	The Adventures of Ford Fairlane	Punk Gunslinger
1991	Switch	Party Guest
1993	Dream Lover	Buddy
1995	Girl in the Cadillac	Lamar
1995	Showgirls	Andrew Carver
1999	Suckers	Everett
1999	The Joyriders	Pony Tail Trucker
2001	Madison	Rick Winston
2007	Treasure Raiders	Beekeeper
2007	Welcome to Paradise	Kent Dylan
2008	Cat City	Senator Jack Sweet
2011	Last Will	Michael Palmer
2011	The Gundown	Travis McCain
2012	Born Wild	C.J. Jennings
2012	Ambush at Dark Canyon	Cage Dalton
2013	Dug Up	Z.Z. West
2013	A Country Christmas	Joe Logan
2014	Reaper	Buck
2014	Finding Harmony	Leon Leatherwood
2014	Hot Bath an' a Stiff Drink	Jesse Parsons
2017	You're Gonna Miss Me	Ward Rockwell
2017	The Last Rampage	Joe Tison
2018	You Can't Say No	Will
2018	Mistrust	Adam Ross
2019	The Legend of 5 Mile Cave	Sheriff John "Doc" Small
2019	Wild League	Jones
2020	Lemonheads	Skinner
2020	Love by Drowning	Detective Bill Dickerson
2020	Death in Texas	"Tex"
2023	Far Haven	Jensen Longley
2025	Long Shadows	Director, writer, and producer

=== Television ===
Year	Title	Role	Notes
1989	Freddy's Nightmares	Ralph	Episode: "Cabin Fever"
1989	Nasty Boys	Drug Dealer	Television film
1989	Jake and the Fatman	Blackmailer	Episode: "Sweet Leilani"
1990	Paradise	Gus	Episode: "Dangerous Cargo"
1990	Alien Nation	Nick Coletta	Episode: "Real Men"
1990	Love and Lies	Steve	Television film
1990	It's Garry Shandling's Show	Roach	Episode: "Chester Gets a Show"
1990	Sunset Beat	German Hitman	Episode: "One Down, Four Up"
1990	Hardball	Angel of Death	Episode: "The Angel of Death"
1990	Quantum Leap	"Boner"	Episode: "M.I.A. - April 1, 1969"
1990	Nasty Boys	Milton "Milt" Jackson	2 episodes
1990	Lucky Chances	"Flash"	3 episodes
1990	In the Heat of the Night	Troy Caldwell	Episode: "And Justice for Some"
1990, 1991	The Young Riders	Jake Colter	2 episodes
1990–1991	Bagdad Cafe	Sheriff Wayne	5 episodes
1991	Good & Evil	Sonny	6 episodes
1991	Vigilante Cop	Michael Sturtevant (Uncredited)	Television film
1993–1998	Dr. Quinn, Medicine Woman	Hank Lawson	120 episodes
1997	Stolen Women: Captured Hearts	General George Armstrong Custer	Television film
1999	The Pretender	Luther Ecksley	Episode: "Countdown"
2000	Nash Bridges	"Rooster"	Episode: "Land Pirates"
2006	In Justice	Mickey Young	2 episodes
2007	Numbers	Vincent Kagan	Episode: "Money for Nothing"
2014	NCIS: Los Angeles	Rand Palmer	Episode: "Leipei"
2018	Home by Spring	Burt	Television film
