= AnnaLynne McCord =

American actress (born 1987)

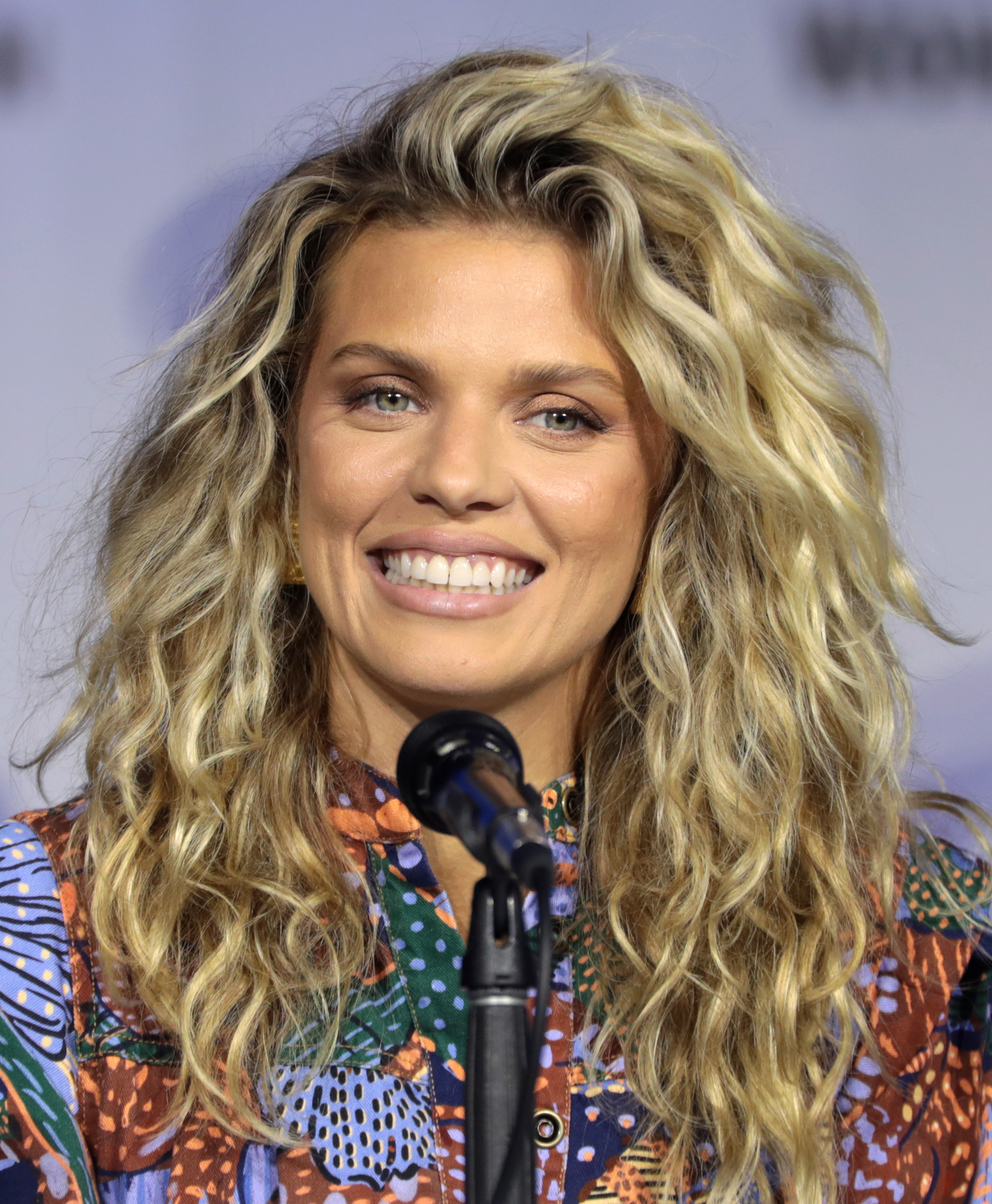
- McCord at the 2022 WonderCon
- Born: July 16, 1987 (age 39); Atlanta, Georgia, U.S.
- Occupations: Actress, model
- Years active: 2002–present
- Spouse: Danny Cipriani (m. 2026)
- Website: theannalynnemccord.com

AnnaLynne McCord (born July 16, 1987) is an American actress and model. Known for playing vixen-type roles, she first gained prominence in 2007 as the scheming Eden Lord on Nip/Tuck, and as the pampered Loren Wakefield on American Heiress. From 2008 to 2013, she was on 90210 as Naomi Clark. In 2024, she joined the cast of Days of Our Lives, receiving a Daytime Emmy nomination for Outstanding Emerging Talent in a Daytime Drama Series.

== Early life ==
McCord was born July 16, 1987, in Atlanta, the daughter of David McCord, a Christian pastor. She was raised in Buford, and Monroe in Georgia, where she grew up of modest means, living in a trailer park. Her parents believed in "strict discipline", in which she was not allowed to watch Harry Potter because it had witches in it. She has two sisters, Rachel and Angel. McCord was home schooled by her mother Shari McCord, and graduated from high school at the age of 15.

== Career ==
After graduating, McCord joined the Wilhelmina Modeling Agency in Miami.

McCord attended a drama school in New York City by the age of 17. A year later, she moved to Los Angeles to audition for roles. She appeared in the 2005 Italian film Natale a Miami and the 2008 horror film remake Day of the Dead. In addition to appearances on Close to Home and The O.C., she played rebellious Loren Wakefield on the MyNetworkTV limited-run serial American Heiress. She was also cast as the star in another MyNetworkTV telenovela, Rules of Deception, but the show never aired, due to a change in the network's programming strategy away from telenovelas.

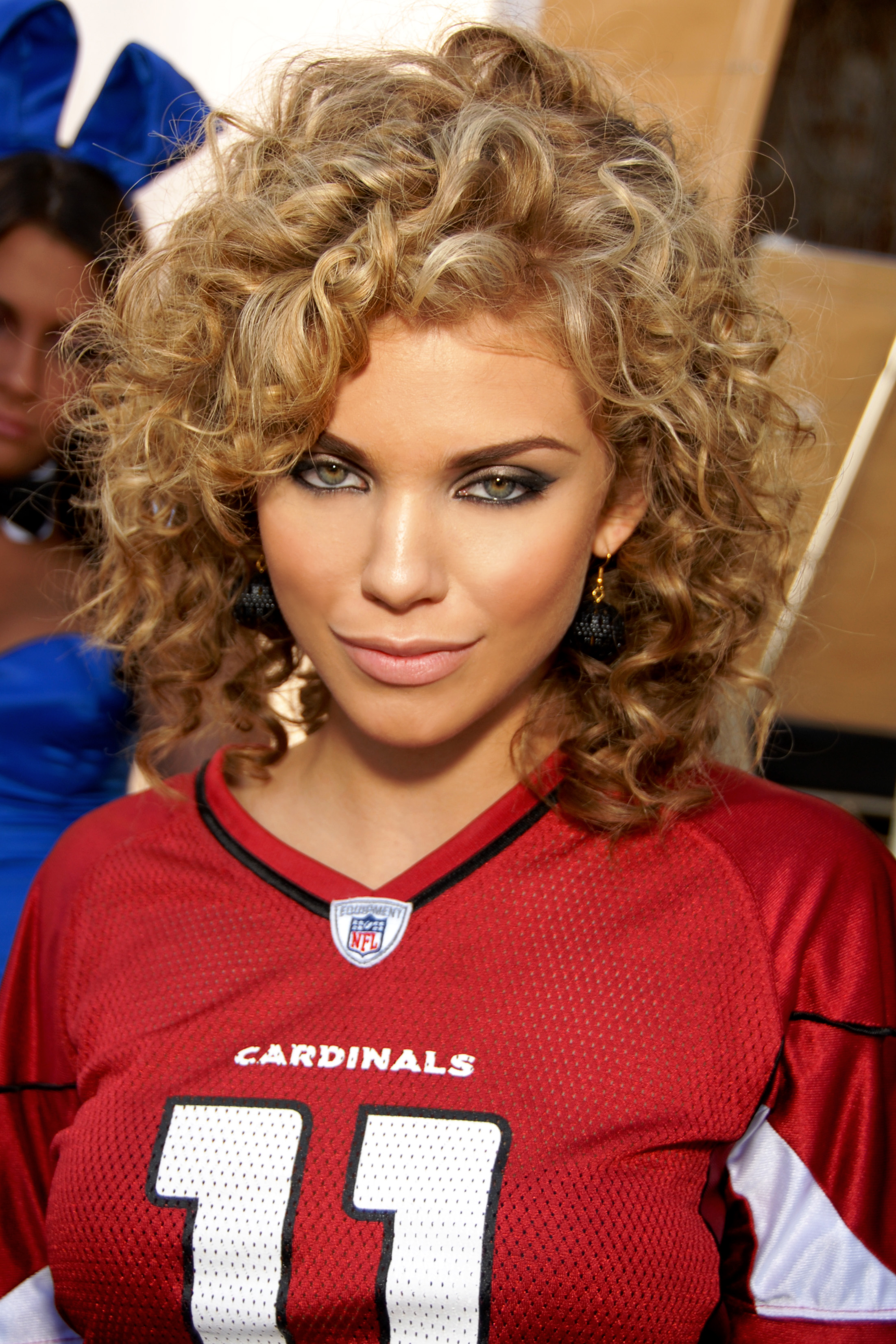
McCord attending Super Bowl XLIII party at the Playboy Mansion in 2009

McCord portrayed Eden Lord in the fifth season of the FX series Nip/Tuck. McCord said in an interview with fearnet.com that it was "fun to play a bad girl."

In 2008, McCord was cast in the series 90210 as Naomi Clark. Initially, the part of Clark was conceived as a supporting role; by the end of the first season, however, media outlets had begun referring to McCord as the series' lead. Throughout the show's run, McCord's character vies for social power and love.

She accepted a role in the Off Broadway play Love, Loss, and What I Wore for an April 27 through May 29, 2011, run with Conchata Ferrell, Minka Kelly, Anne Meara, and B. Smith.

McCord's role in the 2012 film Excision was critically praised. In 2014, McCord joined the cast of the TNT series Dallas for its third season, in the recurring role of Heather. She played the lead role in the 2015 Lifetime film Watch Your Back. In 2018, she starred in First We Take Brooklyn along with Danny A. Abeckaser. In December 2023, it was announced McCord would join the cast of Days of Our Lives, debuting in her role on June 19, 2024.

== Personal life ==
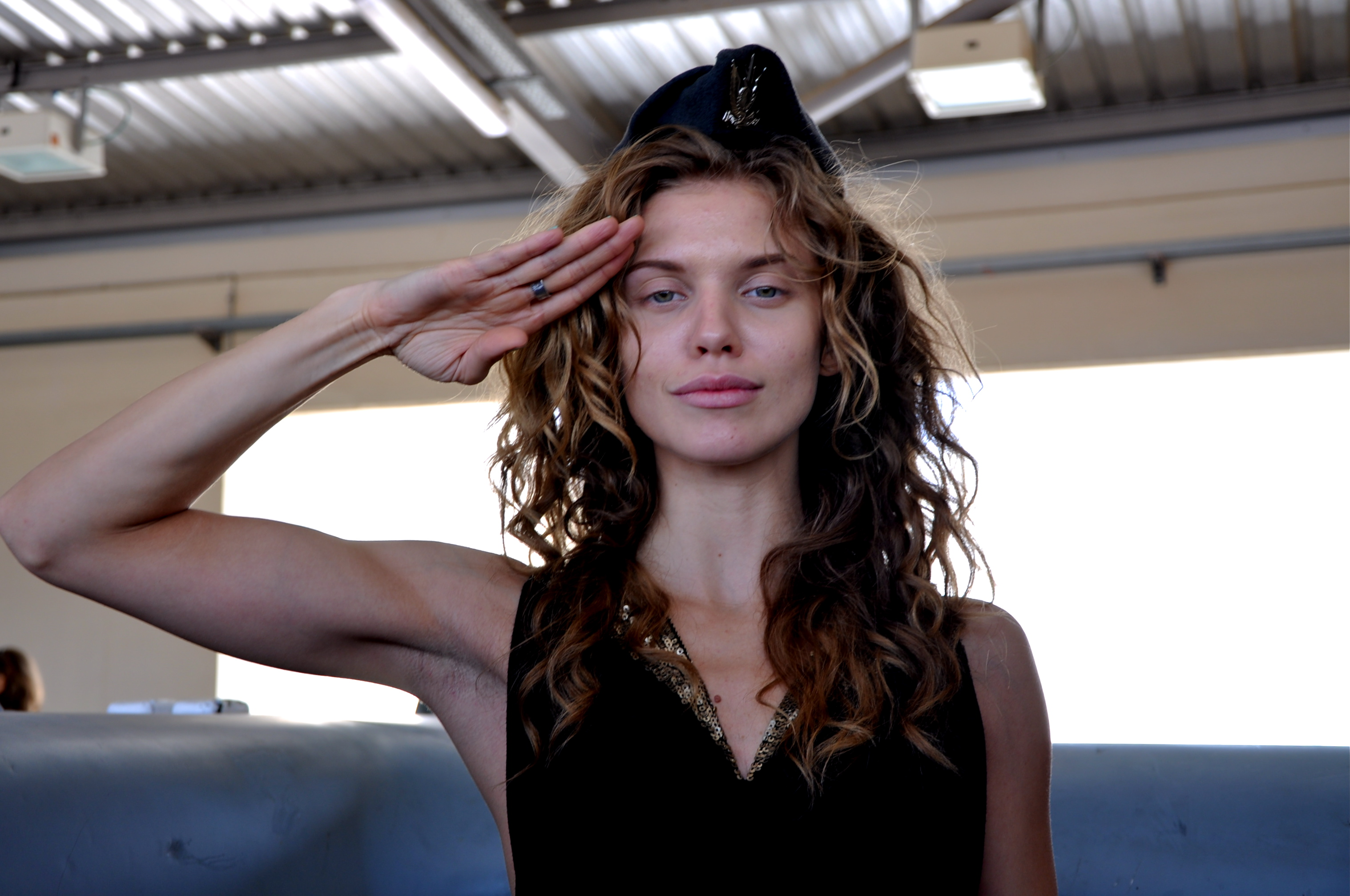
McCord visiting the Palmachim Airbase in Israel, 2012

McCord is a supporter of the St. Bernard Project, a rebuilding organization dedicated to assisting victims of Hurricane Katrina.

In 2011, McCord began dating actor Dominic Purcell. The couple announced an amicable split in 2014, but rekindled their romance a year later. McCord was with Purcell when he suffered a near-fatal accident on the set of Prison Break in Morocco on June 1, 2016, after an iron bar used as a set piece fell onto his head. The couple split in 2018 and stated they were on good terms. On September 25, 2020, Purcell confirmed they had rekindled their relationship with an Instagram post. Their relationship came to an end by November 2022 when Purcell was confirmed to be dating Tish Cyrus.

Since April 2026 McCord is engaged to former England rugby international Danny Cipriani.

In 2014, McCord revealed that a male acquaintance sexually assaulted her when she was 18, and as a result broke down while filming a rape scene in 90210. In March 2015, while speaking at the United Nations in support of UN Women for Peace Association (UNWFPA), McCord announced her alignment with the anti-sexual-assault and domestic abuse project, the No More Campaign. McCord has stated that she has been practicing meditation to help cope with her trauma, and has created a global meditation tour known as the "Love Storm Tour" to help raise awareness of human trafficking. In 2018, McCord was in treatment for PTSD and memories of child sexual abuse, back to the age of 11. In April 2021, she revealed that she had been diagnosed with dissociative identity disorder.

In February 2022, following the Russian invasion of Ukraine, McCord released a video of herself reading a poem on her Twitter, postulating that if she had loved Vladimir Putin as a mother, perhaps an invasion of Ukraine could have been avoided. The video was met with derision by observers and critics, who likened it to Gal Gadot's cover of "Imagine", which was similarly criticized for its perceived tone-deaf message. In an interview with Buzzfeed News, McCord defended the video, claiming that she could have easily become a dictator under different circumstances.

In April 2026, McCord became engaged to former rugby player Danny Cipriani after he proposed on Christmas Day 2025 at her home in Los Angeles with a 15-carat diamond ring. In August that year, McCord and Cipriani faced online criticism after launching a public Honeyfund wedding registry seeking contributions toward their wedding expenses and honeymoon ahead of their planned October 2026 wedding in Los Angeles. The couple married in August 2026.

== Filmography ==
=== Film ===
Year	Title	Role	Notes
2002	The Middle of Nowhere	Cassandra	
2005	Transporter 2	Car jacking girl	
2005	Natale a Miami	Susy	
2007	Sirens of the Caribbean	Britt	
2008	Day of the Dead	Nina	
2008	The Haunting of Molly Hartley	Suzie Woods	
2009	Fired Up!	Gwyneth	
2010	Amexica	Woman	Short film
2010	Gun	Gabriella	
2011	Blood Out	Anya	
2012	Excision	Pauline	
2013	Officer Down	Zhanna Dronov	
2013	Scorned	Sadie	
2014	Gutshot Straight	May	
2015	Santa's Little Helper	Billie	
2016	Trash Fire	Pearl	
2016	Amerigeddon	Sam	
2017	68 Kill	Liza	
2018	First We Take Brooklyn aka Brooklyn Guns	Esther	
2019	Nightmare In Paradise	Liz	
2019	Tone-Deaf	Blaire	
2019	American Skin	Allison Randall	
2020	A Soldier's Revenge	Heather	
2021	Feral State	Detective Ellis	
2022	Titanic 666	Mia Stone	
2023	The Weapon	Iris	
2023	Condition of Return	Eve Sullivan	
2023	Dante's Hotel	Goldie Stanton	

=== Television ===
Year	Title	Role	Notes
2006	The O.C.	Hot girl	Episode: "The Party Favor"
2006	Close to Home	Sara	Episode: "Hot Grrrl"
2007	American Heiress	Loren Wakefield	Main role; 65 episodes
2007	Cold Case	Becca Abrams (1997)	Episode: "Stand Up and Holler"
2007	Ugly Betty	Petra	2 episodes
2007	CSI: Miami	Sherry Williamson	Episode: "Kill Switch"
2007	Greek	Destiny/Patty	Episode: "Friday Night Frights"
2007–2009	Nip/Tuck	Eden Lord	Recurring role (season 5); 12 episodes
2008	Head Case	Tard's date	Episode: "A Tard for All Seasons"
2008–2013	90210	Naomi Clark	Series regular; 114 episodes Nominated - Teen Choice Award for Choice TV: Breakout Star Female
2014	Dallas	Heather	Recurring role
2014	Stalker	Nina Preston	Episode: "Fanatic"
2014	The Christmas Parade	Hailee Anderson	Television movie
2015	Not So Union	Marilyn	Episode: "We're Best Friends"
2015	Watch Your Back	Sarah Miller	Television movie
2016	Secrets and Lies	Melanie Warner	Recurring role
2016	Lucifer	Delilah	Episode: "Pilot"
2016	The Night Shift	Jessica Sanders	Recurring role
2016	Beauty & the Beast	Diane Vaughn	Episode: "Love Is a Battlefield"
2018	Let's Get Physical	Claudia	Recurring role
2019	Anniversary Nightmare	Liz	TV movie aka Wrongfully Accused
2020	Feliz NaviDAD	Sophie	TV movie
2021	Legends of Tomorrow	Irma Rose	Episode: "Stressed Western"
2021–2022	Power Book III: Raising Kanan	Toni Deep	Recurring role
2022	Second Chances	Annalyse	16 episodes
2024–present	Days of Our Lives	Cat Greene	Contract role Nominated - Daytime Emmy Award for Outstanding Emerging Talent in a Daytime Drama Series
2025	Paper Empire	Tabitha Sutton	Episode: "Digital Limbo (Pilot)"

=== Music videos ===
Year	Title	Artist
2003	"Baby, I'm in Love"	Thalía
2016	"Below"	White Lung
2020	"Ass Like Mine"	Morgan McMichaels
