= Trash Fire =

2016 film by Richard Bates Jr.

- Theatrical release poster
- Directed by: Richard Bates Jr.
- Written by: Richard Bates Jr.
- Produced by: David Lawson Jr.; Lawrence Mattis; Matt Smith
- Starring: Adrian Grenier; Angela Trimbur; Fionnula Flanagan; AnnaLynne McCord; Matthew Gray Gubler; Sally Kirkland
- Cinematography: Shane Daly
- Edited by: Yvonne Valdez
- Music by: Michl Britsch
- Production companies: Circle of Confusion; Snowfort Pictures
- Distributed by: Vertical Entertainment; Orion Pictures
- Release dates: January 23, 2016 (Sundance); November 3, 2016 (United States)
- Running time: 93 minutes
- Country: United States
- Language: English

Trash Fire is a 2016 American black comedy film written and directed by Richard Bates Jr. and starring Adrian Grenier, Angela Trimbur, Fionnula Flanagan, AnnaLynne McCord, Matthew Gray Gubler, and Sally Kirkland. The film had its world premiere at the 2016 Sundance Film Festival on January 23, 2016, and was released in a limited release and through video on demand on November 3, 2016, by Vertical Entertainment and Orion Pictures.

== Plot ==
Suffering from depression and longstanding guilt over a fire that killed his parents and disfigured his younger sister Pearl, Owen Roberts struggles through relationship issues with his girlfriend Isabel Sullivan. Together with Isabel and on his own, Owen regularly sees uninterested psychiatrist Florence and takes medication for sudden seizures that include flashbacks to the fateful house fire he blames himself for.

After alienating Isabel's devoutly religious brother Caleb as well as Isabel's friends Sheldon and Amiee, Owen further frustrates Isabel when she reveals she is pregnant and he callously insists on abortion immediately. Owen has a change of heart and expresses a newfound desire to start a family. As a condition of forgiveness and acceptance, Isabel insists that Owen first make amends with his estranged grandmother Violet and sister Pearl, whom he abandoned to live with Isabel following the fire. Owen agrees, but warns Isabel about his grandmother's abrasive disposition.

Devoutly religious, Violet greets the couple coldly, insists they sleep apart, and repeatedly refers to Isabel as a whore. A recluse whom Violet insists remain in her room because of her appearance, Pearl remains hidden away and refuses to see Owen. Isabel wants to leave because of Violet's constant verbal abuse, but Owen insists on staying until he can reconnect with Pearl. While Owen and Violet are out grocery shopping, Isabel privately bonds with Pearl. Later, Isabel repeats her wish to leave after another outburst from Violet at the dinner table, though Pearl visits Isabel during the night trying to convince her to stay.

Violet tampers with Owen's medication. She then goes to see Pastor Sterling at her local church to tell him of haunting visions that she began experiencing when Owen returned. Violet claims that she hears a voice she believes to be God telling her to kill the rest of her family. She confesses that she set the fire that killed her daughter and son-in-law, and convinced Owen he was responsible in order to drive him to suicide. Horrified, Pastor Sterling insists that Violet is delusional. Violet threatens to expose Pastor Sterling for having sex with Owen's mother when she was just fifteen if he goes to the police. Violet then steals a rattlesnake from an aquarium tank in the pastor's office before leaving.

Back at home, Violet hides the snake in the toilet bowl and masturbates while watching an evangelist preach on television. Meanwhile, Owen pays an emotional visit to the site where his family's house once stood. Isabel screams when she discovers the snake. Pearl rushes into the bathroom, kills the snake with her bare hands, and thrusts it at her grandmother in the kitchen. Violet makes Owen go into the crawlspace underneath her house under the pretense of repairing a piping hole where the snake came through. Violet tries starting a fatal fire while Owen is under the porch, but is physically unable to strike the match. Owen and Pearl finally speak to each other. Pearl refuses to forgive Owen for abandoning her.

During the night, Violet enters Pearl's room and points a gun at her granddaughter. Pearl responds by pointing a shotgun at Violet. Violet laughs and leaves the room. Owen takes the tainted medication and collapses in the kitchen. Violet enters and points her gun at Isabel as Isabel cries on the floor over Owen. Pearl comes in with her shotgun and kills both Violet and Owen. While Isabel sits against the wall in shock, Pearl comes over and lays her head on Isabel's pregnant stomach, smiling.

== Cast ==
- Adrian Grenier as Owen Roberts
  - Brayden Austin as Young Owen Roberts
- Angela Trimbur as Isabel Sullivan
- Fionnula Flanagan as Violet Roberts
- AnnaLynne McCord as Pearl Roberts
  - Ruby Lightfoot as Young Pearl Roberts
- Sally Kirkland as Florence
- Matthew Gray Gubler as Caleb Sullivan
- Ezra Buzzington as Sterling
- Molly McCook as Aimee
- Ray Santiago as Sheldon

== Release ==
Trash Fire premiered at the 2016 Sundance Film Festival on January 23, 2016. Shortly after, Vertical Entertainment acquired distribution rights to the film. The film was released in a limited release and through video on demand on November 3, 2016.

=== Critical response ===
On review aggregator website Rotten Tomatoes, the film has an approval rating of 69% based on 26 reviews, with an average rating of 6.66/10. The site's critics consensus reads: "Trash Fire has a confidently scabrous appeal, although its unsympathetic characters and nihilistic black comedy may leave a sour taste with some viewers." Metacritic reports a weighted average score of 42 out of 100, based on 10 critics, indicating "mixed or average reviews".
