= 68 Kill =

- Theatrical release poster
- Directed by: Trent Haaga
- Screenplay by: Trent Haaga
- Based on: 68 Kill by Bryan Smith
- Produced by: David Lawson Jr.; Bob Portal; Travis Stevens
- Starring: Matthew Gray Gubler; AnnaLynne McCord; Alisha Boe; Sheila Vand; Sam Eidson; Michael Beasley
- Cinematography: Needham B. Smith
- Edited by: Valerie Krulfeifer
- Music by: James Griffiths; Haim Frank Ilfman
- Production companies: Alliance Media Partners; Snowfort Pictures
- Distributed by: IFC Midnight
- Release dates: March 11, 2017 (SXSW); August 4, 2017 (United States)
- Running time: 95 minutes
- Country: United States
- Language: English

68 Kill is a 2017 American black comedy crime thriller directed and written by Trent Haaga and starring Matthew Gray Gubler, AnnaLynne McCord, Alisha Boe, Sheila Vand, Sam Eidson and Michael Beasley. It is based on the Bryan Smith novel of the same name. The film was released on August 4, 2017, by IFC Midnight. It made an estimated $96,343 in total domestic video sales.

== Plot ==
Chip is a timid sewer worker who is at the beck and call of his bombshell girlfriend. Liza is unhappy with her life as a prostitute and she is repeatedly abusive towards Chip in their relationship, but he is convinced that he is in love with her. One day, Liza's landlord and steady client, Ken McKenzie, shows her a safe that contains $68,000. She convinces Chip to steal the $68,000 with her. The two sneak into the McKenzies' house, armed and masked. Chip's apprehension of the mission is increased when he sees Liza kill the McKenzies, who witnessed the two burglars in the house. During their heist, a young woman named Violet sees Chip with the McKenzies' bodies and flees. Liza knocks Violet out cold and plans to sell her to her brother Dwayne, who will presumably torture and kill Violet.

Disgusted by Liza's plan, Chip knocks out Liza when she goes to get Violet from the trunk of their car. He shoots at a bypasser who tries to intervene in the situation; when Dwayne emerges from the building waving a machete, Chip shoots him in the shoulder. He then drives away with the money. Liza regains consciousness and chases after Chip, getting him to pull over. She tells him that she forgives him as long as he stays with her, but then loses consciousness again on the side of the road. Chip leaves her there and keeps driving away, until he hears Violet's voice from the trunk and remembers his hostage. When he goes to release her, she subdues him and holds him at gunpoint. With no other option, he decides to take Violet with him to flee with the money. Both are attracted to the other, as they bond over music and jokes in the car. On their trip, a police officer pulls them over, but Violet manages to talk their way out of the policeman inspecting the car further. Chip is impressed at her quick thinking, and the two further bond.

They stop at a gas station, where the clerk, Monica, sees Chip pull out a $100 bill from the envelope of the stolen money. She convinces him to give her more money for her to keep quiet, but Violet steps in and refuses for Chip. The two spend the night at a nearby hotel, where Violet tearfully explains that she was at the McKenzies' that night because McKenzie was forcing her to have sex with him for money. The two make love that night, seemingly safe.

The morning after, Chip wakes up to find his gun, money, and clothes stolen. Frantic, he is mad at himself for letting his guard down around Violet, who he assumes stole his possessions. He discovers her dead body in the bathtub of the room, horrified. Chip asks the man working at the hotel to use his phone to call Liza, since he thinks she is the one behind Violet's murder. The man working tells Chip a description of one of the people at his room the night before, which Chip connects to the gas station worker, Monica. Chip reluctantly incapacitates the man, finds some clothes from the lost-and-found, and steals his car. He goes to the gas station, where the employee working tells Chip where Monica is, with Chip reluctantly giving her cunnilingus in return.

When Chip arrives at the house, it is revealed he has been set up, as the employee was a friend of Monica's. He is taken inside, where one of the men in the house holds him at gunpoint. Chip tries to escape, but is knocked unconscious. Monica explains how and why she robbed Chip and framed him for Violet's death, even though her plan has many faults in it. Monica's group beats Chip while taking drugs that they bought with the stolen money. Chip eventually loses consciousness and has a vision of Violet, who tells him to wake up. When he does, he finds Liza is there, with a gun pointed at his face. Monica and one of her cohorts come out from the bedroom, and threaten Liza. Suddenly, Liza's brother (Dwayne) enters the room, and kills almost all of Monica's gang. With Liza and her brother now in control of the situation, Dwayne orders the two surviving members of Monica's gang (Monica and another woman) into the bedroom, where he rapes and kills one of them, leaving Monica as the only survivor from her original gang. Liza tells Chip that all is forgiven, as long as he still acts as her dog. He refuses, shoots and kills her, then goes into the bedroom to kill Dwayne. Monica thanks Chip for saving her from Dwayne "the pervert," and tells him that she will do anything that he wants her to do. He informs her that he wants her to bring the deceased Violet back to life, and then shoots and kills her (to avenge Monica's murdering of Violet in the first place.) Chip stages the scene to erase his presence at the house, takes the money, and escapes as the cops are driving in the direction of the murder house. On the side of the road, Chip spots a beautiful but provocatively tattooed woman with her car broken down. He considers picking her up, but ultimately speeds far away from her, content with his independence and the money.

== Cast ==
- Matthew Gray Gubler as Chip
- AnnaLynne McCord as Liza
- Alisha Boe as Violet
- Sheila Vand as Monica

== Release ==
The film premiered at South by Southwest on March 11, 2017. On April 19, 2017, IFC Midnight acquired distribution rights to the film. The film was released on August 4, 2017, by IFC Midnight.

== Reception ==
=== Critical response ===
On review aggregator Rotten Tomatoes, the film holds an approval rating of 67% based on 24 reviews, a popcornmeter rating of 27% based on 500+ ratings, with an average rating of 6.1/10, with the general consensus of; "... a proudly morbid, high-energy grindhouse heist movie that succeeds through its bad taste, blood-soaked twists, and hilarious female characters, suffering from poor execution, misogynistic undertones, and a lack of actual depth, ultimately doomed to obscurity."
