= Matthew Gray Gubler =

American actor, filmmaker, author, and model (born 1980)

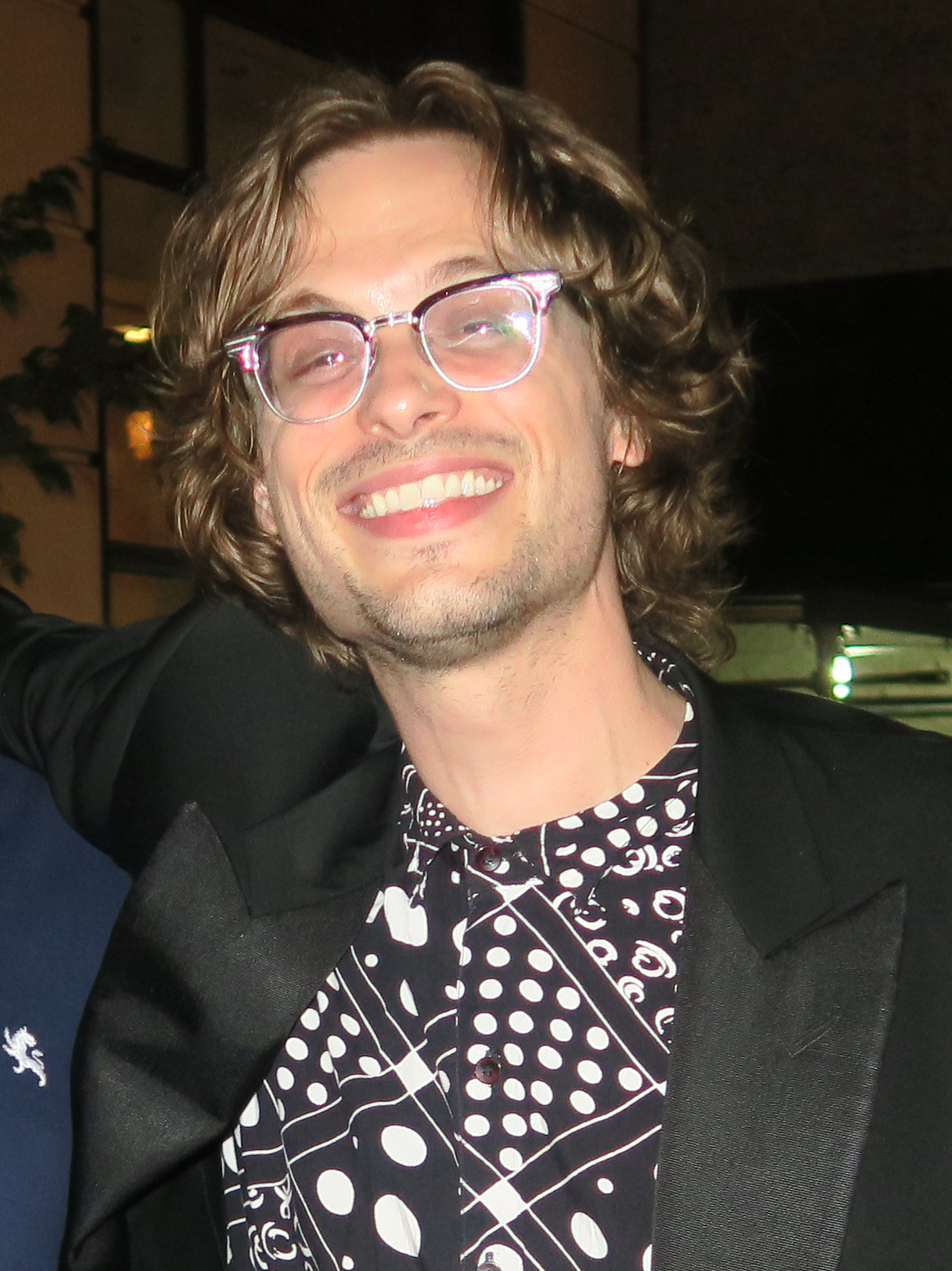
- Gubler in 2017
- Born: March 9, 1980 (age 46); Las Vegas, Nevada, U.S.
- Education: New York University
- Occupation: Actor
- Years active: 2000–present
- Website: matthewgraygubler.com

Matthew Gray Gubler (/ˈɡuːblər/, GOOB-lər; born March 9, 1980) is an American actor, best known for his role as criminal profiler Dr. Spencer Reid in the CBS television show Criminal Minds, for which he also directed several episodes. Gubler has appeared in The Life Aquatic with Steve Zissou, 500 Days of Summer, Life After Beth, Suburban Gothic, and Newness. He was also the voice of Simon in Alvin and the Chipmunks and its three sequels.

== Early life and education ==
Gubler was born on March 9, 1980, in Las Vegas, the son of Marilyn (née Kelch), a rancher and political consultant, and John Gubler, an attorney. Gubler is a high school graduate of the Las Vegas Academy of the Arts, where he studied acting because the school did not offer his first choice, filmmaking. He is a graduate of the New York University Tisch School of the Arts, where he majored in film directing.

== Career ==
=== Modeling ===
While studying film at NYU, Gubler was discovered by a model scout and then worked as a model with DNA Model Management for Tommy Hilfiger, Marc Jacobs, and American Eagle, among others. He has been ranked 46th on models.com's list of top 50 male models.

=== Acting ===
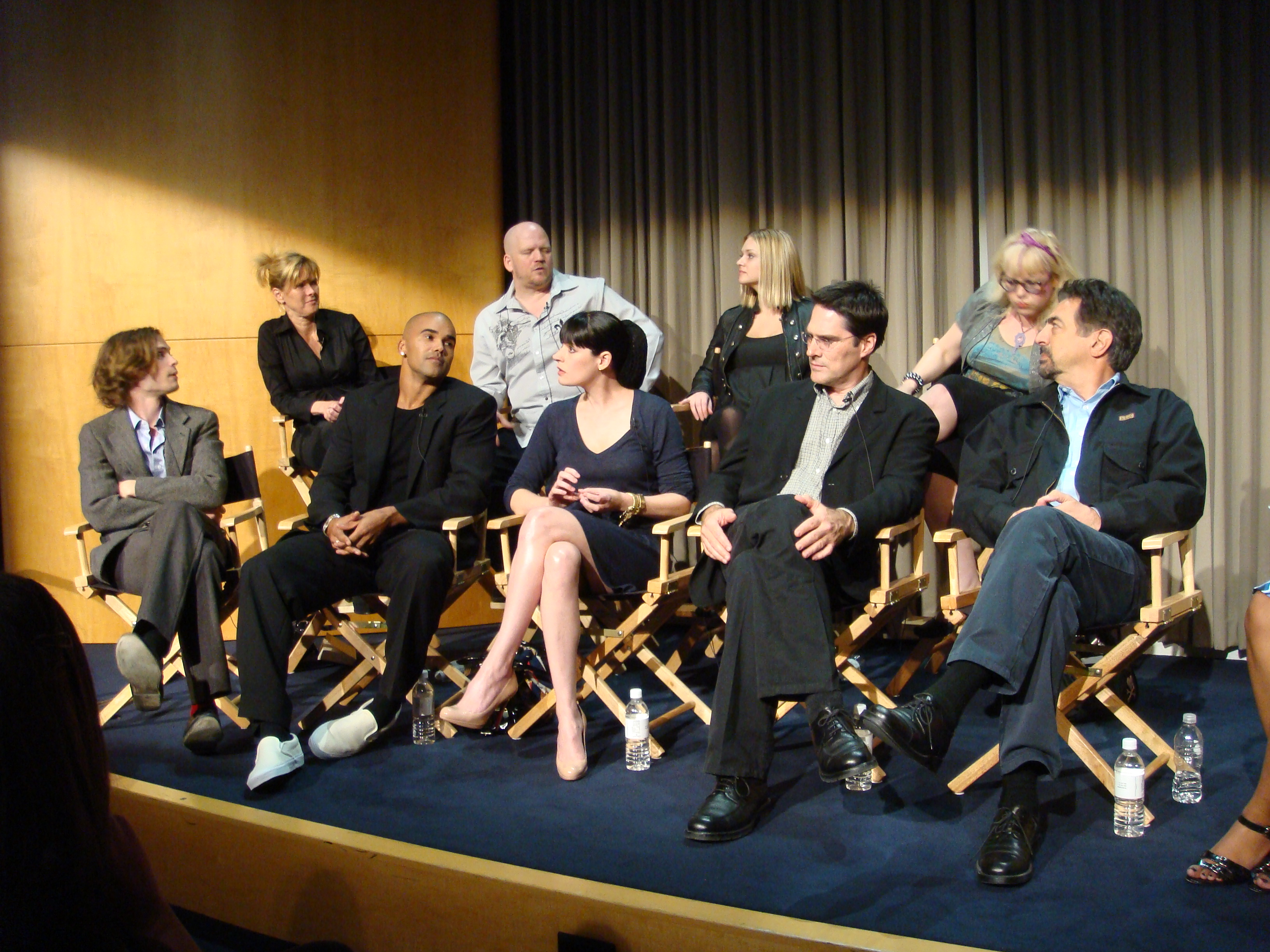
Gubler (far left) with other Criminal Minds cast members

After he began modeling, Gubler had an internship with Wes Anderson, who encouraged him to audition for a part in his movie The Life Aquatic with Steve Zissou. Gubler did, and landed the role of Nico (a.k.a. Intern #1). This led, in 2005, to Gubler being cast in Criminal Minds. Criminal Minds ran from 2005 to 2020, and Gubler performed in all 15 seasons. Gubler played a starring role of Dr. Spencer Reid, a genius FBI profiler; Gubler is best known for playing this role and was regarded as a fan favorite. Criminal Minds won the 2017 People's Choice Award for Favorite TV Drama. Gubler did not appear in the 2022 reboot of the series.

Gubler played Joe Joe in the film RV (2006). He voiced Simon the chipmunk in Alvin and the Chipmunks (2007), Alvin and the Chipmunks: The Squeakquel (2009), Alvin and the Chipmunks: Chipwrecked (2011), and Alvin and the Chipmunks: The Road Chip (2015). He appeared as Bart, the main character, in How to Be a Serial Killer (2008), and as Paul in (500) Days of Summer (2009). He provided the voice of Winsor in Scooby-Doo! Legend of the Phantosaur (2011).

In 2014, Gubler acted in the zombie comedy Life After Beth and the film Suburban Gothic, for which he received the Screamfest Award for Best Actor.

Gubler has done voice work for the DC Universe Animated Original Movies line. He played Jimmy Olsen in All-Star Superman and voices the Riddler in the animated film, Batman: Assault on Arkham (2014). Gubler has also appeared in the films Band of Robbers (2015), 68 Kill (2017), Endings, Beginnings (2019), and Horse Girl (2020). He appeared in the 2019 Hulu series Dollface.

=== Filmmaking and directing ===
While making The Life Aquatic with Steve Zissou, Gubler made a documentary titled Matthew Gray Gubler's Life Aquatic Intern Journal, a behind-the-scenes view of the making of the film, which was later included in The Criterion Collection DVD release. He directed and starred in a series of self-deprecating mockumentaries titled Matthew Gray Gubler: the Unauthorized Documentary in which he parodies Hollywood behavior, which were filmed on the set of Criminal Minds. A follow-up, Matthew Gray Gubler: The Authorized Documentary, was also made.

Gubler directed, edited, and co-produced the music videos for "Don't Shoot Me Santa" and "Dirt Sledding" by Las Vegas rock band the Killers.

Gubler directed 12 episodes of Criminal Minds.

=== Painting ===
In September 2005, the Gallery of Fine Art in Ostrava, Czech Republic, held a showing of 12 watercolors by Gubler; all the works were sold. On September 6, 2008, his art was featured in a group show entitled "Paper Cuts" at The Little Bird art gallery in Atwater Village, California. Gubler contributed a painting of "Sandy The Mammoth" to the Western Heritage Museum & Lea County Cowboy Hall of Fame. In July 2010, his paintings were featured in Juxtapoz magazine.

In October 2011, an original watercolor by Gubler entitled "Mushface" was sold on eBay for $10,100. Gubler donated the proceeds to the Smith Center for the Performing Arts in Las Vegas.

Gubler's paintings were highlighted in a 2013 interview with BuzzFeed.

=== Writing ===
Gubler wrote and illustrated his first book, Rumple Buttercup: A Story of Bananas, Belonging and Being Yourself, which was released on April 2, 2019. It is published as a children's book, but Gubler says it is for all ages, "for anyone who's ever felt like they didn't quite fit in, just to make them know that they're not alone ... My hope in writing the book was to find a way to give the world a 136-page hug." He hand-wrote or hand-drew everything in the book – "every single word, every single illustration, including the bar code and the lengthy copyright page." In 2023 The Little Kid with the Big Green Hand was published.

== Personal life ==
As of 2009, Gubler divided his time between Los Angeles, Las Vegas, and New York City.

In 2009, while filming (500) Days of Summer in Los Angeles, Gubler dislocated his knee while out dancing. The injury required three surgical procedures and the use of a cane for nearly a year, which was written into the script of Criminal Minds.

On October 27, 2014, Gubler became a certified minister and officiated at the wedding of Steve Damstra and Gubler's Criminal Minds co-star Paget Brewster on November 29, 2014.

== Filmography ==
=== Film ===
Year	Title	Role	Notes
2004	The Life Aquatic with Steve Zissou	Intern #1	
2006	RV	Joe Joe	
2007	Alvin and the Chipmunks	Simon Seville	Voice
2008	The Great Buck Howard	Russell	
2008	How to Be a Serial Killer	Bart	
2009	(500) Days of Summer	Paul	
2009	Alvin and the Chipmunks: The Squeakquel	Simon Seville	Voice
2011	All-Star Superman	Jimmy Olsen	Voice
2011	Scooby-Doo! Legend of the Phantosaur	Winsor	Voice
2011	Magic Valley	Mok	
2011	Alvin and the Chipmunks: Chipwrecked	Simon Seville	Voice
2012	Excision	Mr. Claybaugh	
2014	Life After Beth	Kyle Orfman	
2014	Suburban Gothic	Raymond	Screamfest Award for Best Actor
2014	Hot Air	Lesley	
2014	Batman: Assault on Arkham	Edward Nygma / The Riddler	Voice
2014	Beautiful Girl	Ziggy	
2015	Alvin and the Chipmunks: The Road Chip	Simon Seville	Voice
2015	Band of Robbers	Joe Harper	Executive Producer
2016	Trash Fire	Caleb	
2017	Newness	Paul	
2017	68 Kill	Chip	
2018	Zoe	Michael	
2019	Endings, Beginnings	Adrian	
2020	Horse Girl	Darren Colt	
2021	King Knight	Thorn	

=== Television ===
Year	Title	Role	Notes
2005–2020, 2025	Criminal Minds	Dr. Spencer Reid	325 episodes Main role (Seasons 1–15); Special Guest Star (Season 18, Episode 3)
2011	Celebrity Ghost Stories	Himself	Season 3, Episode 4
2012	The Beauty Inside	Alex #30	Season 1, Episodes 3 and 4 Daytime Emmy New Approaches Original Daytime Program or Series
2016	@midnight	Himself	
2019–2022	Dollface	Wes	7 episodes
2026	Rugrats	Howard DeVille (voice)	Episode: "Desert Trip"
TBA	Einstein	Lew Einstein	Main role; also producer

=== Miscellaneous ===
Year	Title	Notes
2005	Claude: A Symphony of Horror	Director
2005	Matthew Gray Gubler's Life Aquatic Intern Journal	Editor, cinematographer, producer, writer, director
2005	The Cactus That Looked Just Like a Man	Editor, cinematographer, producer, writer, director
2006	Matthew Gray Gubler: The Unauthorized Documentary	Producer, writer (concept), director
2006	Reagan	Whirlwind Heat's music video - director
2007	Don't Shoot Me Santa	The Killers music video - director, editor, co-producer
2005–2020	Criminal Minds	Series regular Director (12 episodes) "Mosley Lane" (Season 5, episode 16) "Lauren" (Season 6, episode 18) "Heathridge Manor" (Season 7, episode 19) "The Lesson" (Season 8, episode 10) "Alchemy" (Season 8, episode 20) "Gatekeeper" (Season 9, episode 7) "Blood Relations" (Season 9, episode 20) "Mr. Scratch" (Season 10, episode 21) "A Beautiful Disaster" (Season 11, episode 18) "Elliott's Pond" (Season 12, episode 6) "The Capilanos" (Season 13, episode 17) "The Tall Man" (Season 14, episode 5)
2014	Desire	Short - actor
2015	Dirt Sledding	The Killers music video - director, producer
2020	Beginner's Luck	Short - actor
2020	Moonlight	Future Islands music video - actor
