= Fired Up! =

2009 film by Will Gluck

- Theatrical release poster
- Directed by: Will Gluck
- Written by: Will Gluck (credited as Freedom Jones)
- Produced by: Matthew Gross; Peter Jaysen; Charles Weinstock
- Starring: Nicholas D'Agosto; Eric Christian Olsen; Sarah Roemer; Molly Sims; Danneel Harris; Adhir Kalyan; AnnaLynne McCord; Philip Baker Hall; John Michael Higgins
- Cinematography: Thomas E. Ackerman
- Edited by: Tracey Wadmore-Smith
- Music by: Richard Gibbs
- Production companies: Moving Pictures; Gross Entertainment; Weinstock Productions; Stage 6 Films (uncredited)
- Distributed by: Screen Gems (through Sony Pictures Releasing)
- Release date: February 20, 2009 (United States)
- Running time: 90 minutes
- Country: United States
- Language: English
- Budget: $20 million
- Box office: $18.5 million

Fired Up! is a 2009 American teen sex comedy film directed by Will Gluck (in his directorial debut) who is also credited with writing the film under the pseudonym Freedom Jones. The film's plot revolves around two popular high school football players who decide to attend a cheerleading camp for the summer to get close to its 300 female cheerleaders. The film was released on February 20, 2009, by Screen Gems (through Sony Pictures Releasing). The film received negative reviews from critics and audiences and was a commercial flop, having grossed $18.5 million against a $20 million budget.

== Plot ==
Nick Brady and Shawn Colfax are popular high school football players who con their way into cheerleading camp in order to meet girls.

While attending the cheer camp, not only do Nick and Shawn hook up with girls, but they realize that they actually enjoy cheerleading. As they start to care about their squad and the cheer competition, they help motivate their teammates to improve and to believe in themselves. Shawn develops feelings for the head cheerleader, Carly Davidson, and Nick chases after Diora, their camp coach's wife.

Carly and the rest of the squad soon find out about the boys' original motives for attending cheer camp, thanks to her boyfriend 'Dr. Rick'. The freshman pre-med student pulls out two bus tickets Nick had bought, revealing that Nick and Shawn initially planned to leave cheer camp before the cheer competition. They leave camp after being ejected from the squad.

While attending a party at their football team friend's house, Nick and Shawn realize they are genuinely fond of cheer camp and want their squad to succeed. Not enjoying themselves as much as they expected, they sneak away. Nick and Shawn return to cheer camp to help the squad in the cheer competition.

While the guys are doing their final competition routine, Carly sees Rick cheating on her with their rivals' head cheerleader, Gwyneth. So, Shawn and Carly later focus all of their attention on the routine. At the last minute they change out the squad's safe routine for the "Fountain of Troy" maneuver.

It results in their best finish yet, although their almost perfect attempt at executing the forbidden maneuver fails at the end. Shawn accidentally goes for a triple backflip instead of a double like Carly and backflips into the water in front of them. The crowd gasps at the impact and the squad rushes to help, but Shawn manages to emerge shouting "Tigers!" before losing consciousness.

Although the squad did not win the contest, they place ten spots better than they had the previous year. The film ends when Nick and Shawn end up with their love interests, with Shawn and Carly kissing each other.

== Cast ==
- Nicholas D'Agosto as Shawn Colfax
- Eric Christian Olsen as Nick Brady
- Sarah Roemer as Carly Davidson
- Molly Sims as Diora
- David Walton as Dr. Rick
- AnnaLynne McCord as Gwyneth
- Adhir Kalyan as Brewster
- Collins Pennie as Adam
- Juliette Goglia as Poppy Colfax
- Hayley Marie Norman as Angela
- Margo Harshman as Sylvia
- Danneel Harris as Bianca
- John Michael Higgins as Coach Keith
- Philip Baker Hall as Coach Byrnes
- Edie McClurg as Mrs. Klingerhoff
- Jake Sandvig as Downey
- Nicole Tubiola as Marcy
- Smith Cho as Beth
- Masi Oka as Eagle Mascot
- Michael Blaiklock as Mookie
- Alan Ritchson as Bruce
- Tanya Chisholm as Denise
- Julianna Guill as Another Girl
- Kayla Ewell as Margot Jane Lindsworth-Calligan
- Rachele Brooke Smith as Tiger Cheerleader
- Kate French as Cute Captain
- Jessica Szohr as Kara
- Kelen Coleman as Maddy
- Francia Raisa as Marly
- Janel Parrish as Lana
- Kate Lang Johnson as Jennifer
- Jill Latiano as Haley
- Shoshana Bush as Girl
- Amber Stevens as Sara
- Heather Morris as Fiona
- Madison Riley as Lily
- Nicholas James as Chester
- Anthony Padilla as Football player #4 (cameo) (uncredited)

== Production ==
=== Filming locations ===
Taking place in Illinois, almost all of the filming shots of the high school in the film were taken at South Pasadena High School in 2008. However, the hallway scene was filmed at John Burroughs High School in Burbank, California. To make filming easier, the fictional Gerald R. Ford High School's mascot was made the "Tigers" since South Pasadena High's mascot is a tiger. Some of the South Pasadena Tigers Football team's gear such as pads, were borrowed for use in the film. However, filming for the football game scene took place at Calabasas High School. The filming of the pool scene took place at Long Beach Polytechnic High School. The cheerleader camp was filmed at Occidental College, which incidentally also has the tiger as a mascot. In one of the early scenes, the train passing by is the Metro Gold Line. The location where the cheerleaders were practicing was filmed in the Los Angeles County Arboretum and Botanic Garden.

== Reception ==
=== Critical response ===
When the film was released, it was screened to negative reviews. Rotten Tomatoes gave the film a rating of 25% based on 106 reviews, with an average score of 4.10/10. The site's consensus states: "Though not as raunchy or juvenile as the average teen comedy, Fired Up is also not as funny." Metacritic gave the film a "generally unfavorable" score of 31 based on a normalized average of 18 reviews.

A common criticism, addressed by director Will Gluck in the film's commentary track, is that the filmmakers "casted a little bit older." Star Eric Christian Olsen adds, "If by 'older,' you mean thirteen years!" Lead actors Olsen and Nicholas D'Agosto were playing high school students at the ages 30 and 27 at the time of filming, respectively. Gluck also points out negative reviews by Roger Ebert, The New York Times, and The Washington Post.

One of the more positive reviews, from Hollywood.com, admits the film is satisfying for the audience it is aimed towards: "An outrageous, sex-obsessed teen comedy that's something to cheer about -- especially if you're 16."

=== Box office ===
The film was considered financially unsuccessful. Fired Up! had a budget of $20 million and took in a box office gross of $18,599,102 worldwide before leaving theaters. It opened up to the U.S. box office at number 9 with $5.4 million behind films like Paul Blart: Mall Cop, which was in its sixth week of release at the time, and Confessions of a Shopaholic, in its second.

On the DVD commentary, the business it did (or lack thereof) is discussed, with director Will Gluck stating, "In retrospect, we probably should have done R, but I kind of like the idea of doing a movie that everyone can go see, and not just 'over 18 or have to sneak into it.'" It left American cinemas after seven weeks.

== Home media ==
The movie was released on DVD, UMD, and Blu-ray formats June 9, 2009. An unrated version was also released containing non-censored profanity and brief nudity not seen in the theatrical cut. Canadian singer Avril Lavigne's song "Girlfriend" was on the film's soundtrack.
