= Mark L. Young =

American actor (born 1988)

- Born: Markell V. Efimoff; August 22, 1988 (age 38); Everett, Washington, U.S.
- Education: La Salle University
- Occupation: Actor
- Years active: 2003–present

Markell V. Efimoff (born August 22, 1988), known professionally as Mark L. Young, is an American actor.

== Early life ==
Markell V. Efimoff (Russian: Маркелл В. Ефимов) was born in Everett, Washington, of Russian descent. He has a fraternal twin, Arthur, and an older sister, Arlaris.

Young began acting at the age of nine and moved to Los Angeles when he was 12 to pursue his career. His first significant on-screen credit was a small role in two episodes of the HBO series Six Feet Under.

== Career ==
Young's notable appearances include television shows The Comeback, The O.C., Dexter, Big Love, Childrens Hospital, Heroes, Secret Life of the American Teenager, Cold Case, ER, CSI: Crime Scene Investigation and The Inbetweeners, while his film credits include Sex Drive, Happiness Runs, The Lucky Ones, We're the Millers and Tammy.

== Filmography ==
=== Film ===
| Year | Film | Role | Note |
|---|---|---|---|
| 2003 | Rogues | Choir | |
| 2004 | Harry + Max | Teen Harry | |
| 2005 | In Memory of My Father | Middle Chris | Deleted scenes |
| 2008 | Sex Drive | Randy | |
| 2008 | The Lucky Ones | Scott Cheaver | |
| 2010 | Happiness Runs | Victor | |
| 2013 | Movie 43 | Calvin Cutler | |
| 2013 | Beneath | Grubbs | |
| 2013 | We're the Millers | Scottie P | |
| 2014 | Tammy | Jesse | |
| 2014 | The Guilty Innocent | Josh | |
| 2015 | The Curse of Downers Grove | Ian | |
| 2015 | Daddy's Home | Dental Hygienist | |
| 2017 | Swing State | Neil Hornback | |
| 2017 | Dirty Lies | Josh | |
| 2018 | False Profits | Travis Pitts | |
| 2019 | Bad Art | Benji | |

=== Television ===
| Year | Film | Role | Note |
|---|---|---|---|
| 2003 | Still Standing | Kid #1 | Episode: "Still Partying" |
| 2003–2004 | Six Feet Under | Eric Sheedy | 2 episodes |
| 2005 | CSI: Miami | Lucas Hall | Episode: "Nailed" |
| 2005 | The O.C. | Prepubescent Geek #1 | Episode: "The Ex-Factor" |
| 2006 | Dexter | Jeremy Downs | 2 episodes |
| 2006 | Cold Case | Young Jed Huxley | Episode: "The Key" |
| 2007 | CSI: Crime Scene Investigation | Tommy Halpert | Episode: "Lying Down with Dogs" |
| 2007 | ER | Evan Hayes | Episode: "Crisis of Conscience" |
| 2009 | Big Love | Franky Harlow | 4 episodes |
| 2009 | The Secret Life of the American Teenager | Thomas | 2 episodes |
| 2009 | Heroes | Jeremy Greer | 2 episodes |
| 2010 | CSI: NY | Tom Reynolds | Episode: "Hide Sight" |
| 2010 | Childrens Hospital | Raye LePlante | Episode: "Joke Overload" |
| 2010 | Criminal Minds | Owen Porter | Episode: "Exit Wounds" |
| 2012 | The Inbetweeners | Neil Sutherland | Main cast; 12 episodes |
| 2013 | Workaholics | Simon | Episode: "Fourth and Inches" |
| 2013 | Kroll Show | Mark's Son | Episode: "Can I Finish?" |
| 2013 | The Neighbors | Logan | Episode: "Good Debbie Hunting" |
| 2013–2014 | Betas | Trevor | 5 episodes |
| 2014 | Mind Games | Ryan McKee | Episode: "Apophenia" |
| 2014 | The Comeback | Tyler Beck | 8 episodes |
| 2015 | Life in Pieces | Scarecrow | Episode: "Godparent Turkey Corn Farts" |
| 2016 | Aquarius | Bobby Beausolein | 2 episodes |
| 2016 | Code Black | Justin Keller | Episode: "Hero Complex" |
| 2017 | Ten Days in the Valley | PJ | 6 episodes |
| 2019 | Veronica Mars | Jimmy | Episode: "Spring Break Forever" |
| 2020 | Filthy Rich | Jason Conley | Main cast; 10 episodes |
