= American Cowslip =

- Theatrical film poster
- Directed by: Mark David
- Written by: Mark David; Ronnie Gene Blevins
- Produced by: Mark David; Ronnie Gene Blevins; Brent Clackson
- Starring: Diane Ladd; Rip Torn; Cloris Leachman; Bruce Dern; Hanna R. Hall; Val Kilmer; Peter Falk; Ronnie Gene Blevins
- Cinematography: Mark David
- Edited by: Jonathan Lucas; Mark David
- Music by: Joseph Blaustein; Mark David
- Production companies: Buffalo Speedway Film Company; Muper Films
- Distributed by: Buffalo Speedway Film Company
- Release date: July 24, 2009
- Running time: 113 minutes
- Country: United States
- Language: English

American Cowslip is a 2009 American independent comedy film directed by Mark David. It revolves around heroin addict, Ethan Inglebrink, whose life is centered on his garden and his group of eccentric friends. American Cowslip is David's third film, following his debut, Sweet Thing (1999), and his second, acclaimed feature, Intoxicating (2003). It was Peter Falk's final film role.

== Plot ==
Ethan Inglebrink (Ronnie Gene Blevens) is an agoraphobic heroin addict who lives in a homogeneous California town where nothing ever happens. A misfit, clad in a powder blue tux, he has convinced his poker buddies, and surrogate moms, Roe (Diane Ladd), Sandy (Cloris Leachman), and Lou Anne (Lin Shaye), that he is diabetic and his needles are for insulin, not heroin. His next-door neighbor is his landlord and former high school football coach Trevor O'Hart (Rip Torn), who wants nothing more than to kick Ethan out on the street. Complicating matters even further is that Ethan's older brother Todd (Val Kilmer), the local sheriff, is convinced that his brother can only be saved by an act of God, and recruits the family priest (Peter Falk) to get the job done. Meanwhile, as the Garden of the Year competition draws near, Ethan becomes convinced that he can take the $10,000 top prize and pay off his delinquent rent if he can just grow the perfect American Cowslip. Little does Ethan realize that salvation may lie not in the money he could win for growing a rare flower, but with the companionship and understanding offered by his 17-year-old neighbor Georgia (Hanna R. Hall), who longs to escape her abusive father (Bruce Dern).

== Cast ==
- Ronnie Gene Blevins as Ethan Inglebrink
- Val Kilmer as Todd Inglebrink
- Diane Ladd as Roe
- Rip Torn as Trevor O'Hart
- Cloris Leachman as Sandy
- Lin Shaye as Lou Anne
- Josh Perry as Billy
- Peter Falk as Father Randolph
- Bruce Dern as Cliff
- Tom Huddlestone as Rabbi Dave
- Priscilla Barnes as Samantha
- Hanna R. Hall as Georgia
- Blake Clark as Grimes
- Trevor Lissauer as Jim Bob
- Erik Fellows as Rourke
