= Long Shadows (film) =

- Theatrical release poster
- Directed by: William Shockley
- Written by: William Shockley; Shelley Reid; Grainger Hines
- Produced by: William Shockley; Grainger Hines; Tom Brady; Allen Gilmer; Tiiu Loigu; Justin Kreinbrink
- Starring: Dermot Mulroney; Dominic Monaghan; Jacqueline Bisset; Blaine Maye; Sarah Cortez; Chris Mulkey; Anthony Skordi; Ronnie Gene Blevins
- Cinematography: A.J. Raitano
- Edited by: Chris Patterson
- Music by: Tommy Fields
- Production company: Tiki Tane Pictures
- Distributed by: Quiver Distribution
- Release date: November 7, 2025
- Running time: 100 minutes
- Country: United States
- Language: English

Long Shadows is a 2025 American western thriller film written, produced, and directed by William Shockley.

== Cast ==
- Dermot Mulroney as Dallas Garrett
- Dominic Monaghan as Ned Duxbury
- Jacqueline Bisset as Vivian Villeré
- Blaine Maye as Marcus Dollar
- Sarah Cortez as Dulce Flores
- Chris Mulkey as Roy Holt
- Anthony Skordi as Father Giovanni Rossetti
- Ronnie Gene Blevins as Knox Weaver

== Production ==
The film entered development in May 2024, with William Shockley directing his feature film debut. Dermot Mulroney, Dominic Monaghan, Jacqueline Bisset, Blaine Maye, Sarah Cortez, Chris Mulkey, Anthony Skordi, and Ronnie Gene Blevins joined the main cast. In March 2025, Quiver Distribution acquired the distribution rights to the film.

== Release ==
Long Shadows was released in the United States on November 7, 2025.
