= Happiness Runs =

- Film poster
- Directed by: Adam Sherman
- Written by: Adam Sherman
- Produced by: Stephen Israel
- Starring: Mark L. Young; Hanna R. Hall; Rutger Hauer; Andie MacDowell
- Cinematography: Aaron Platt
- Edited by: Jonathan Alberts
- Music by: Reinhold Heil; Johnny Klimek
- Distributed by: Strand Releasing
- Release date: May 1, 2010 (USA Film Festival)
- Running time: 88 minutes
- Country: United States
- Language: English

Happiness Runs is a 2010 American drama film written and directed by Adam Sherman and starring Mark L. Young, Hanna R. Hall, Rutger Hauer and Andie MacDowell.

== Cast ==
- Mark Boone Junior as Victor's Father
- Joseph Castanon as "Little Mackie"
- Richard Edson as Pete
- Shiloh Fernandez as Jake
- John Fleck as Chad's Dad
- Kevin Gage as Hypnotist
- Hanna R. Hall as Becky
- Rutger Hauer as Insley
- Andie MacDowell as Victor's Mother
- Ann Magnuson as Chad's Mom
- Steven Christopher Parker as Tao
- Jesse Plemons as Chad
- Mark L. Young as Victor

== Reception ==
As of June 2020, Happiness Runs holds a 17% approval rating on Rotten Tomatoes, based on twelve reviews with an average rating on 3.33/10. Christian Blauvelt of Slant Magazine awarded the film three stars out of four. Stephen Garrett of Time Out awarded the film one star out of five.
