= Suburban Gothic (film) =

- Theatrical release poster
- Directed by: Richard Bates Jr.
- Written by: Richard Bates Jr. Mark Bruner
- Produced by: Dylan Hale Lewis
- Starring: Matthew Gray Gubler; Kat Dennings
- Cinematography: Lucas Lee Graham
- Edited by: Steve Ansell; Yvonne Valdez
- Music by: Michl Britsch
- Production company: New Normal Films
- Distributed by: Filmbuff
- Release dates: July 19, 2014 (Fantasia Festival); January 30, 2015 (United States)
- Running time: 90 minutes
- Country: United States
- Language: English

Suburban Gothic is a 2014 American supernatural comedy horror film directed by Richard Bates Jr. It had its world premiere on July 19, 2014, at the Fantasia International Film Festival and stars Matthew Gray Gubler as a young man who returns home only to find himself faced with the supernatural. The film was released in select theaters and via video on demand platforms on January 30, 2015.

== Plot ==
Unable to find a job after graduating business school, Raymond Wadsworth is forced to move back home with his parents. His mother Eve is a socialite who secretly fantasizes about Hector, the foreman of the crew working on her home and yard renovations. Raymond’s father Donald works as a high school football coach and exhibits racial prejudices. Raymond borrows a car from his cousin Freddy, who Donald has barred from the Wadsworth home since Freddy came out as gay. Raymond reacquaints himself with a former classmate named Becca who works at a local bar and they take a romantic interest in one another. Raymond also begins having regular run-ins with a bully from childhood named Pope.

Hector’s construction crew digs up a child’s skeleton buried in a wooden box on the Wadsworth property. Hector steals a necklace from the corpse before instructing his men to rebury the body and to not report the discovery to anyone. Hector then goes missing after being pulled into a bush by an unseen force. He later returns in an incoherent state.

Raymond begins experiencing paranormal activity throughout the house. Alphonse, one of Hector’s employees, warns Raymond about what happened with the body. Raymond seeks Becca’s help with investigating the poltergeist. Becca encourages Raymond to reconnect with the sensitivity to supernatural phenomena that he exhibited as a child before he went on medication. Raymond investigates the “Longstreet Ranch 1860” brand found on the box in the yard. He discovers that Ambrose Longstreet and his daughter Hannah were murdered in 1860 by the notorious Bogden brothers. Raymond determines that he and Becca need to rebury Hannah’s body to put her spirit to rest and they begin attempting to make contact with the dead. Donald discovers that Raymond found the makeshift coffin and encourages his son to drop the matter. Raymond forces his father to reveal the body’s location and learns that Donald donated it to Cornelius at the Historical Society. Cornelius is a dead end, but his assistant Virginia offers to help Raymond and Becca.

Virginia helps Raymond recover Hannah’s skeleton. Becca drops it during the reburial and ends up with a strange wound on her hand. She and Raymond rebury the body, but the hauntings continue. Virginia brings her psychic granddaughter Zelda to the Wadsworth house for a séance and they eventually learn that Ambrose wants his daughter’s necklace returned. Raymond discovers that the blood pressure medication he had been taking for years was actually an anti-psychotic. Because he was trying to have his son committed to a mental institution, Donald instructed Dr. Carpenter to take Raymond off his secret meds, which is why his paranormal awareness returned. Raymond recovers Hannah’s necklace from Hector’s daughter Noelle. While he and Becca attempt to rebury the necklace, Donald calls the police to take his son away. The cops arrive just as the burial is completed. Everyone goes inside the house when a storm gathers and they watch as Ambrose and Hannah’s ghosts are laid to rest.

Donald is forced to sell the house in the aftermath. Eve marries Hector. Raymond and Becca open up a paranormal investigation agency named Edge City Supernatural Detectives.

== Cast ==
- Matthew Gray Gubler as Raymond
- Kat Dennings as Becca Thompson
- Ray Wise as Donald
- Barbara Niven as Eve
- Muse Watson as Ambrose
- Sally Kirkland as Virginia
- Mel Rodriguez as Hector
- Jeffrey Combs as Dr. Carpenter
- John Waters as Cornelius
- Ronnie Gene Blevins as Pope
- Jack Plotnick as Cousin Freddy
- Ray Santiago as Alberto
- Shanola Hampton as Ticona
- Mackenzie Phillips as Mrs. Richards
- Mckenna Grace as Zelda
- Jessica Camacho as Noelle

== Reception ==
Critical reception for Suburban Gothic was mixed. On the review aggregator website Rotten Tomatoes, 70% of 10 critics' reviews are positive. Frequent elements of praise centered upon the film's acting and script, which Film School Rejects cited as a highlight. Shock Till You Drop gave a predominantly positive review, but commented that they would like to see Bates "drop the humor and go right for the throat with a scary haunted house film or supernatural thriller." The Hollywood Reporter was more negative in their review, criticizing it for "[running] out of steam in its second half" and stating that the romance between Gubler and Dennings was unsatisfying and that "The perfunctory resolution to their would-be romance is no more gratifying than a climax in which both spirit-world drama and Raymond's domestic conflict are wrapped up in a single tidy event."

At Screamfest 2014, Gubler received an award for Best Actor for his performance.
