= Excision (film) =

2012 horror film

- Promotional release poster
- Directed by: Richard Bates Jr.
- Written by: Richard Bates, Jr.
- Produced by: Dylan Hale Lewis
- Starring: AnnaLynne McCord; Traci Lords; Ariel Winter; Roger Bart; Jeremy Sumpter; Matthew Gray Gubler; John Waters; Marlee Matlin; Ray Wise; Malcolm McDowell
- Cinematography: Itay Gross
- Edited by: Yvonne Valdez; Steve Ansell
- Music by: Steve Damstra II; Mads Heldtberg
- Production company: BXR Productions
- Distributed by: Anchor Bay Films
- Release dates: January 21, 2012 (Sundance); October 16, 2012 (United States)
- Running time: 81 minutes
- Country: United States
- Language: English

Excision is a 2012 American psychological body horror film written and directed by Richard Bates Jr., and starring AnnaLynne McCord, Traci Lords, Ariel Winter, Roger Bart, Jeremy Sumpter, Malcolm McDowell, Matthew Gray Gubler, Marlee Matlin, Ray Wise, and John Waters. The film is a feature-length adaptation of the 2008 short film of the same name, and focuses on a disturbed teenage girl with aspirations of becoming a surgeon who goes to extreme lengths to earn the approval of her mother.

Excision premiered at the 2012 Sundance Film Festival.

== Plot ==
Pauline is a disturbed, delusional high school student who aspires to become a surgeon despite her dysfunctional family life. Her younger sister, Grace, has cystic fibrosis, and the girls' controlling, strongly Catholic mother Phyllis shares a strained marriage with their father, Bob. Pauline often has vivid dreams about herself and others being mutilated with excessive amounts of blood, after which she wakes panting in an orgasmic state.

Pauline decides to lose her virginity to a classmate named Adam, choosing to do so while on her period because of her fascination with blood. She and Adam have sex, and as she has an orgasm, she imagines herself choking Adam and the bed filling with blood. She then asks Adam to perform oral sex on her. Unaware that she is menstruating, he obliges, only to run to the bathroom in disgust when he tastes the blood.

During a sex education class, Pauline examines a sample of her own blood under a microscope, mistakenly believing she can detect sexually transmitted diseases that way. She later approaches Adam while he is with his girlfriend Natalie and alludes to their encounter, causing Natalie to break up with him. Natalie and her friend later throw toilet paper and spray paint profanities on Pauline's house. At school the next day, Pauline assaults both Adam and Natalie, and is consequently expelled.

Pauline overhears her parents discussing Grace's doctor's plans to put her on a waiting list to receive a lung transplant. That night, Grace suffers a severe coughing fit. In the morning, Pauline drugs Bob's tea and ties him up before confronting a neighbor who had rebuffed Pauline's earlier attempts at friendship. She lures the girl to her backyard and uses chemicals to knock her out, subsequently drugging Grace.

Pauline shaves her head before attempting to transplant the healthy girl's lungs into Grace's body, placing Grace's diseased lungs on ice, and stitching both girls up. Phyllis arrives home, panics at the sight of Bob bound and gagged, and begins frantically searching the house for her daughters. She finds Pauline in the garage with the bodies. Pauline explains that it is her first surgery and urges Phyllis to take a closer look. Phyllis screams hysterically before embracing her. Pauline at first smiles proudly, but then begins to wail as she seemingly realizes what she has done.

== Cast ==
- AnnaLynne McCord as Pauline
- Traci Lords as Phyllis
- Ariel Winter as Grace
- Roger Bart as Bob
- Jeremy Sumpter as Adam
- Malcolm McDowell as Mr. Cooper
- Matthew Gray Gubler as Mr. Claybaugh
- Marlee Matlin as Amber
- Ray Wise as Principal Campbell
- John Waters as Father William
- Molly McCook as Natalie
- Natalie Dreyfuss as Abigail
- Cole Bernstein as Kimberly
- Emily Bicks as Breanna
- Brennan Bailey as Sebastian
- Matthew Fahey as Nathan
- Sidney Franklin as Timothy

== Production ==
Excision is Richard Bates, Jr.'s first feature film. Bates, a Virginia native and graduate of the New York University Tisch School of the Arts, filmed Excision over 28 days in and around Los Angeles, California.

== Release ==
Excision premiered at the 2012 Sundance Film Festival. Excision played in the category of Park City at Midnight.

=== Home media ===
Anchor Bay Entertainment released Excision on DVD and Blu-ray on October 16, 2012.

== Reception ==
The review aggregation website Rotten Tomatoes gives the film a score of 85%, based on reviews from 27 critics, with an average rating of 6.8/10. The website's consensus reads, "Excision effectively blends body horror and adolescent drama, although its visceral aggression definitely isn't for all tastes."

Robert Koehler of Variety called it "technically polished juvenilia that provokes without resonance". At The A.V. Club, two critics reviewed it at Sundance. Noel Murray rated it B+ and wrote, "This is one of the damnedest 'adolescent misfit' movies you'll ever see—for those who can stomach the splatter, that is." Nathan Rabin rated it B+ and called it "a supremely nasty piece of work in the best way possible." Steve Rose of The Guardian rated it 2/5 stars and wrote, "This body-horror teen effort could have [been] Cronenberg meets Solondz – but it isn't". Witney Seibold of IGN rated it 7.5/10 and wrote, "Excision is twisted, ballsy, nasty, kind of gross, and more than a little bit disturbing." Streiber states it "revels a little too much in its gore" and seems as though it is a splatter film "only intended to shock", though the ending "clearly accentuates the tragedy of its clearly insane main character."
