= Richard Bates Jr. =

American filmmaker

Richard Bates Jr. is an American filmmaker. Films he has directed include Excision (2012), Suburban Gothic (2014), Trash Fire (2016), Tone-Deaf (2019) and King Knight (2021).

== Personal life ==
Bates has said in a 2022 interview with Comic Book Resources: "A lot of my family is Southern Baptist, which never really appealed to me."

== Filmography ==
Year	Film	Credited as		
Year	Film	Director	Producer	Writer
2012	Excision	Yes	No	Yes
2014	Suburban Gothic	Yes	Yes	Yes
2016	Trash Fire	Yes	No	Yes
2019	Tone-Deaf	Yes	No	Yes
2021	King Knight	Yes	Yes	Yes
