= Ronnie Gene Blevins =

American actor (b. 1977)

- Born: June 20, 1977 (age 49); Harris County, Texas
- Occupation: Actor
- Years active: 2001 - present
- Website: Official site

Ronnie Gene Blevins (born June 20, 1977) is an American character actor. He is best known for his role as small-time criminal Willie Russell in the 2013 film Joe, directed by David Gordon Green.

== Career ==
His TV credits include NCIS, True Detective, Kingdom and Twin Peaks. Other notable works include The Dark Knight Rises, Seven Psychopaths, Avenged and the 2018 remake of Death Wish.

Blevins wrote, produced and starred in the 2009 independent film American Cowslip.

== Personal life ==
Blevins is deaf in one ear and blind in one eye. He is married to actress Veronica Burgess, with whom he has a son.

== Filmography ==
=== Film ===
- A.I. Artificial Intelligence (2001, as Robot - uncredited)
- Better Luck Tomorrow (2002, as Skinhead - uncredited)
- Bleed (2002, as Peter)
- Eiderdown Goose (2003, as Matty)
- Birth Rite (2003, as Paul Guilford)
- The Affair (2004, as Donny)
- Freezerburn (2005, as Peter)
- Look @ Me (2006, as Cyber Fan)
- ...Less Than Kind (2008, as Roman)
- A Beautiful Life (2008, as Henry)
- Night Life (2008, as Junky)
- American Cowslip (2009, as Ethan Inglebrink)
- Area Q (2011, as Husband with a video camera)
- Kiss the Abyss (2012, as Bruce)
- Enchanted Affairs (2012)
- Commander and Chief (2012, as Perry Houser)
- The Dark Knight Rises (2012, as Cement Truck Driver)
- Seven Psychopaths (2012, as First Cop)
- Least Among Saints (2012, as Ronnie)
- Ambush at Dark Canyon (2012, as Tom Sullivan)
- Shadow on the Mesa (2013, as Trace Hodges)
- Jobs (2013, as Dealer - uncredited)
- Samuel Bleak (2013, as Walters)
- Past God (2013, as James' Father)
- To Hell with a Bullet (2013, as Boomer Cobb)
- Joe (2013, as Willie-Russell)
- Sequence (2013, as Robber)
- The Hunted (2013, as Stevie)
- Avenged (2013, as Jed)
- Thrillseekers the Indosheen (2013, as Calvin)
- Small Time (2014, as Greedy Bob)
- Suburban Gothic (2014, as Pope)
- The Gnashing (2014, as Sid)
- Hot Bath an' a Stiff Drink (2014, as Hopps Kinney)
- Jonny's Sweet Revenge (2014, as Sully)
- Hot Bath an' a Stiff Drink 2 (2014, as Hopps Kinney)
- Uncle John (2015, as Danny)
- Then There Was (2014, as Lee)
- When the Storm God Rides (2014, as Chad Cooper)
- Texas Heart (2014, as Peter / Frank)
- Crawlspace (2015, as Ray Walsh)
- Burning Kentucky (2015, as Rule)
- The Perfect Guy (2015, as Dalton)
- Fear, Inc. (2016)
- The Neighbor (2016)
- Death Wish (2018, as Joe Gannon)
- Tone-Deaf (2019, as David)
- The Wave (2019, as Ritchie)
- Death in Texas (2020, as Billy Walker)
- The Conjuring: The Devil Made Me Do It (2021, as Bruno Sauls)
- What Josiah Saw (2021, as Billy)
- Father Stu (2022, as Joe)
- Emancipation (2022, as Harrington)
- Squealer (2023, as Squealer)
- Long Shadows (2025, as Knox Weaver)
- Come with Me (TBA, as Gary Parker)

=== Television ===
- Black Tie Nights (2004, 1 episode, as Nick)
- Guilty or Innocent? (2005, 1 episode, as Detective Max Guilliani)
- Over There (2005, 1 episode, as Squad leader)
- Mind of Mencia (2006, 1 episode, as Revolutionary Ron)
- Californication (2006, 1 episode, as Guitar Center Employee)
- Lincoln Heights (2007, 1 episode, as Gavin)
- ER (2007, 1 episode, as Nemo Baker)
- The Young and the Restless (2008, 1 episode, as Franco)
- The Cleaner (2008, 1 episode, as Jesse Menlo)
- Sons of Anarchy (2008, 1 episode, as Andy Krieder)
- The Shield (2008, 1 episode, as Marcus)
- NCIS (2009, 1 episode, as Ronald Nowakowski)
- CSI: Crime Scene Investigation (2009, 1 episode, as Rudy)
- Saving Grace (2009, 1 episode, as Vaughn)
- Curb Your Enthusiasm (2009, 1 episode, as Angry Driver)
- Numb3rs (2009, 1 episode, as Mutt)
- Southland (2009 - 2011, 3 episodes, as Barry)
- The Forgotten (2010, 1 episode, as Eddie Ratner)
- True Blood (2010, 2 episodes, as T Dub)
- Medium (2010, 2 episodes, as The Biker)
- Lie to Me (2010, 1 episode, as Hoodak)
- Law & Order: LA (2010, 1 episode, as Cal Gerrity)
- Justified (2011, 1 episode, as Carter Hayes)
- CSI: NY (2011, 1 episode, as Mark Fields)
- Hawaii Five-0 (2011, 1 episode, as Jason Akita)
- The Mentalist (2012, 1 episode, as Elwood Spiller)
- Vegas (2012, 1 episode, as Todd Thurman)
- Kingdom (2014, 4 episodes, as Michael)
- Intelligence (2014, 1 episode, as Luther Vick)
- Shameless (2014, 1 episode, as Lewis)
- Criminal Minds (2014, 1 episode, as Miles Lee)
- Agents of S.H.I.E.L.D. (2014, 1 episode, as Deacon)
- True Detective (2015, 3 episodes, as Stan)
- Twin Peaks (2017, 1 episode, as Tommy)
- Animal Kingdom (2021, as Jeremy)
- Tulsa King (2022, as Ben Hutchins)
- Lady in the Lake (2024, as Officer Boško)
