= Brandon Beemer =

American actor

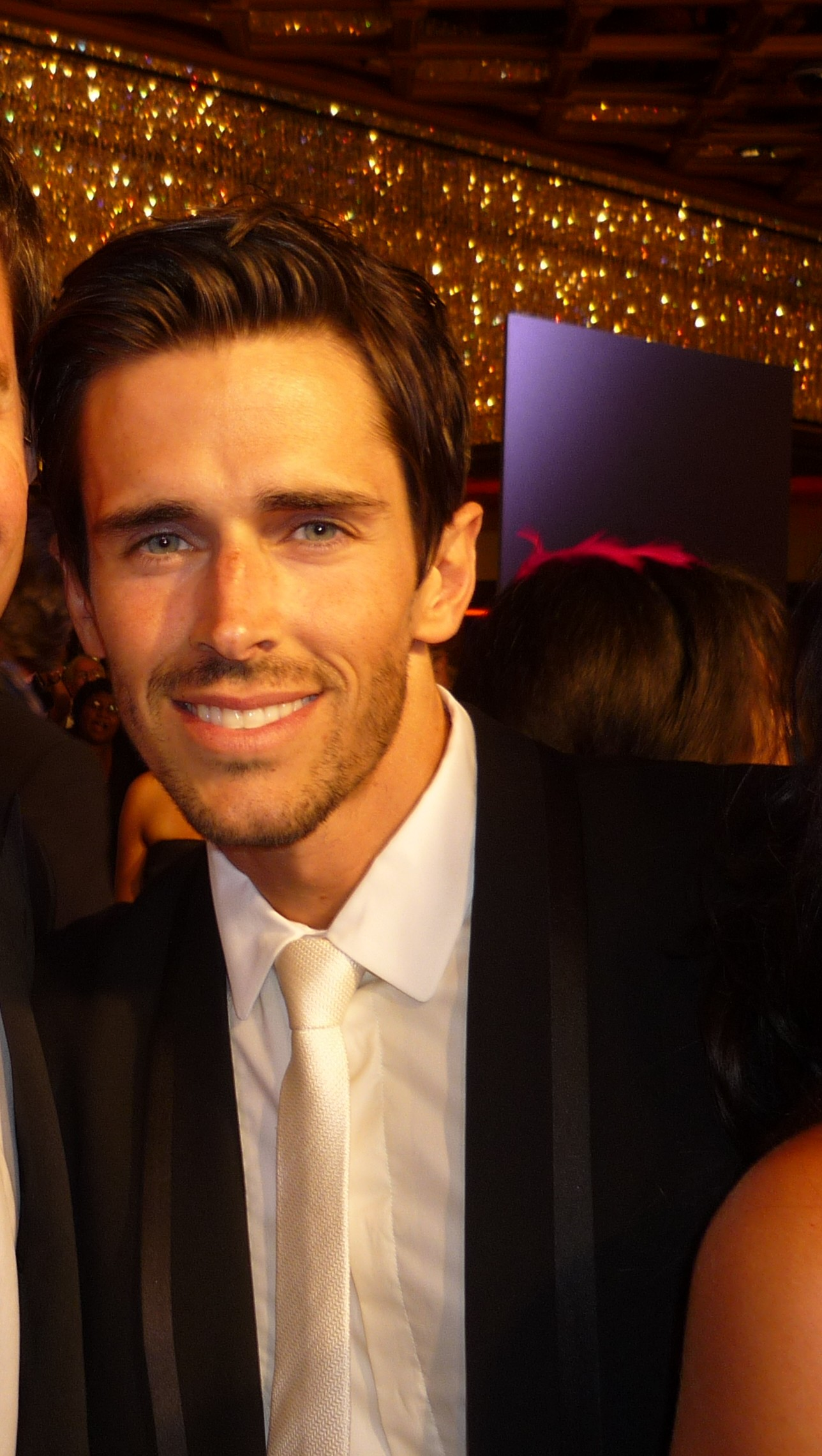
- Beemer in 2010
- Born: Eugene, Oregon, U.S.
- Occupation: Actor
- Years active: 2001–present
- Website: brandonbeemer.com

Brandon Beemer is an American actor, best known for his role in the soap operas as Shawn-Douglas Brady in the NBC/Peacock soap opera Days of Our Lives (2006–2008, 2016–2023) and Owen Knight in the CBS daytime series The Bold and the Beautiful (2008–2012).

== Early life ==
Beemer was born in Eugene, Oregon. He is of German and Irish ancestry. His first job was as a driver at the local Coca-Cola bottling plant. After high school, he moved to New York City and briefly modeled. There, he began taking acting classes, and soon decided to move to Los Angeles to pursue acting full-time.

== Career ==
Beemer played Shawn-Douglas Brady on Days of Our Lives and made his debut in the role on September 29, 2006. He replaced Jason Cook, who had played the role since October 1999. On January 21, 2008, it was reported that Beemer and his co-star Martha Madison had been fired from the show. Their last airdate was March 24, 2008. It was announced in May 2008 that Beemer would be joining the cast of The Bold and the Beautiful. Beemer made his debut on B&B, July 2, 2008. He played Owen Knight from 2008 to 2012.

In 2011, Beemer was part of the cast in the docu-reality show Dirty Soap, a new reality series following the real-lives of 5 fellow soap stars that documents both their personal and professional lives. Dirty Soap debuted on September 25, 2011, on the E! Network. On February 9, 2012, Beemer starred as psychologist Luke Parker in the first official screening of the short horror film, BloodMoon, directed by Farnaz Samiinia. In 2013, he starred in the television movie Bering Sea Beast, and also appeared on Michelle Stafford's comedy series The Stafford Project. He also portrayed Dylan in the horror-thriller film Fear Clinic.

On November 10, 2015, it was confirmed that Beemer would reprise his portrayal of Shawn-Douglas Brady on Days of Our Lives.

== Filmography ==
=== Film ===
| Year | Title | Role | Notes |
|---|---|---|---|
| 2001 | The Brotherhood | Frat Slob | Direct-to-video |
| 2005 | Suits on the Loose | Justin | |
| 2006 | Material Girls | Mic Rionn | |
| 2012 | Blood Moon | Dr. Luke Parker | Short film |
| 2013 | Wrong Cops | Xavier Brown | |
| 2013 | Bering Sea Beast | Owen | Television film |
| 2013 | Non-Stop | Dean | Television film |
| 2014 | Wedding Planner Mystery | Holt Walker | Television film |
| 2015 | Fear Clinic | Dylan | |
| 2015 | In Extremis | Father Dumal | |
| TBD | Life with Dog | Norman | |

=== Television ===
| Year | Title | Role | Notes |
|---|---|---|---|
| 2001 | Undressed | Lucas | Recurring role |
| 2003 | CSI: Crime Scene Investigation | Ross Jenson | Episode: "Jackpot" |
| 2005–06 | General Hospital | Seth | Recurring role |
| 2006–2008, 2016–2023 | Days of Our Lives | Shawn-Douglas Brady | Series regular |
| 2008–2012 | The Bold and the Beautiful | Owen Knight | Series regular |
| 2011 | CSI: Miami | Derek Vaughn | Episode: "Stiff" |
| 2011 | Dirty Soap | Himself | |
| 2013 | The Stafford Project | Charles | Episode: "Reality Adjustment" |
| 2016–present | The Bay | Evan Blackwell; Young John (flashback) | Series regular |
| 2017 | Their Killer Affair | Nick Curtis | Television film |
| 2019-2020 | Days of Our Lives: Last Blast Reunion | Shawn-Douglas Brady | Web series |
| 2022 | 9-1-1: Lone Star | Patrick | Episode: "Riddle of the Sphynx" |
