= Dourif =

Dourif is a surname. Notable people with the surname include:

- Brad Dourif (born 1950), American film and television actor
- Fiona Dourif (born 1981), American actress and producer, daughter of Brad
