= William Fichtner =

American actor (born 1956)

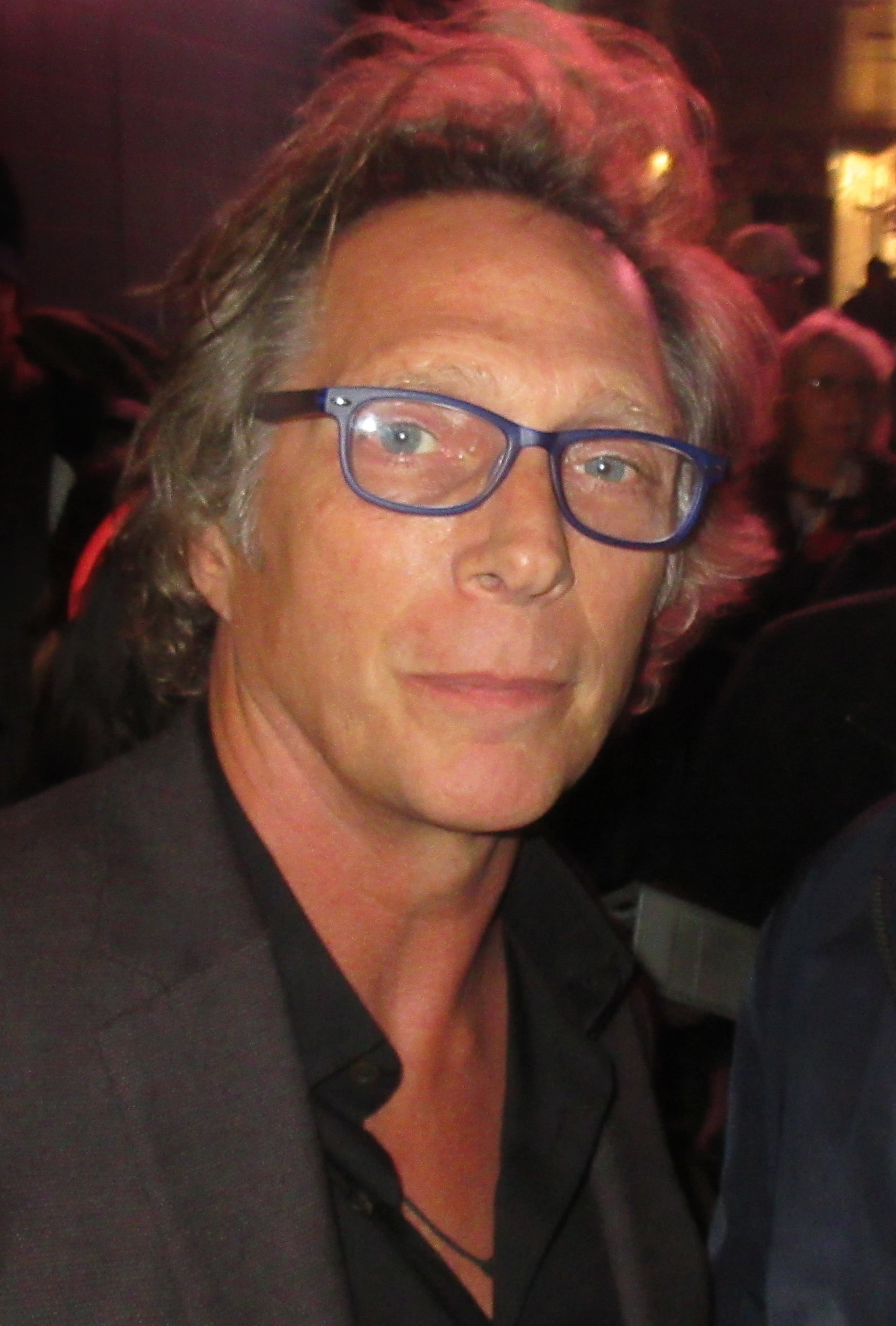
- Fichtner in 2018
- Born: November 27, 1956 (age 69); Mitchel Air Force Base, New York, U.S.
- Education: Farmingdale State College (AAS); SUNY Brockport (BA)
- Occupation: Actor
- Years active: 1987–present
- Spouses: Betsy Aidem (m. 1987; div. 1996); Kymberly Kalil (m. 1998)
- Children: 2

William Edward Fichtner (born November 27, 1956) is an American actor. Raised in Buffalo, New York, he started his career in 1995 with supporting appearances in Virtuosity , Heat and Strange Days . A prolific character actor in film, Fichtner is recognized for memorable performances in Contact (1997), Armageddon (1998), Go (1999), The Perfect Storm (2000), Black Hawk Down (2001), Crash (2004), and The Longest Yard (2005).

In 2005, Fichtner starred as Sheriff Tom Underlay in Invasion (2005–2006), a science fiction TV series. He later appeared as Alexander Mahone in Prison Break (2006–2009), Carl Hickman in Crossing Lines (2013–2014), and Adam Janikowski in Mom (2016–2021).

== Early life, family and education ==
Fichtner was born November 27, 1956, on Mitchel Air Force Base on Long Island, New York, and raised in Cheektowaga, New York, a suburb of Buffalo. He is the son of Patricia A. (née Steitz) and William Frederick Fichtner. He has German ancestry.

He graduated in 1974 from Maryvale High School in Cheektowaga. He earned an Associate of Applied Science degree in criminal justice from Farmingdale State College, graduating in 1976, then attended the State University of New York at Brockport and earned a Bachelor of Arts degree in criminal justice in 1978. In an interview with Michael Rosenbaum, Fichtner recalled he took a theatrical improvisation class initially to fill a fine arts requirement, and the professor recommended he consider taking further acting classes. He then studied at the American Academy of Dramatic Arts in New York.

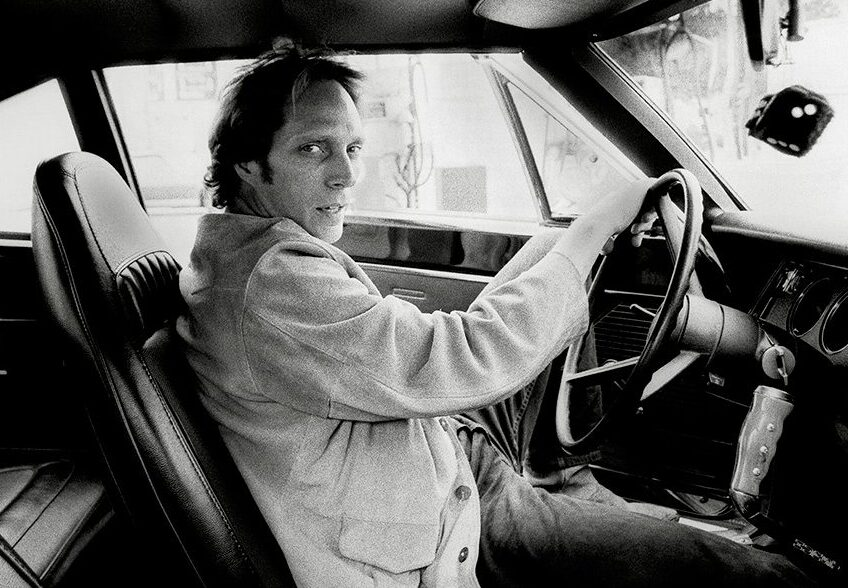
Fichtner in 2003

== Career ==
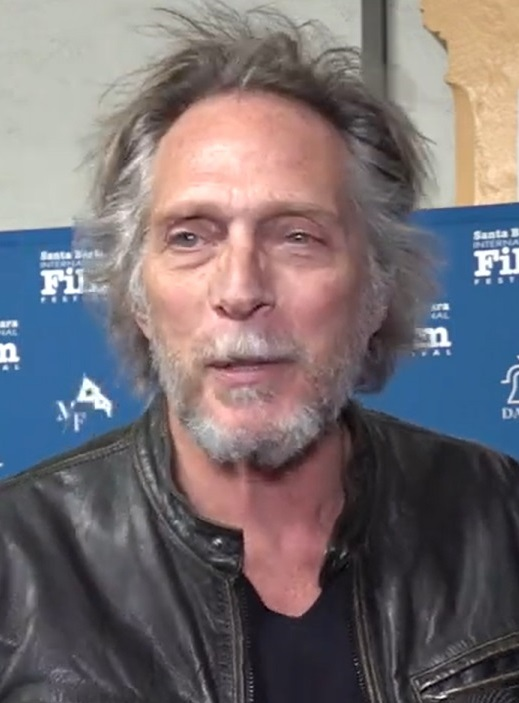
William Fichtner in 2024

Fichtner began his acting career playing the role of Rod Landry in As the World Turns in 1987. He has also appeared in the films Contact, Heat, Armageddon, Go, Equilibrium, Black Hawk Down, The Perfect Storm, The Longest Yard, Crash, Ultraviolet, Drive Angry and The Dark Knight. Mainly a character actor, one of his few leading roles is in Passion of Mind, also starring Demi Moore and Stellan Skarsgård. His role in Crash won him a Screen Actors Guild Award for Outstanding Performance by a Cast in a Motion Picture award and a Best Acting Ensemble award from Broadcast Film Critics Choice. He appeared in the CBS sitcom Mom from 2015 to 2021.

Fichtner voiced Ken Rosenberg in the video games Grand Theft Auto: Vice City and Grand Theft Auto: San Andreas. He is credited as Willian Fichtner in Vice City and Bill Fichtner in San Andreas. Between 2005 and 2006, he also starred in the sci-fi TV series Invasion as Sheriff Tom Underlay. After Invasion was canceled, he played ruthless FBI Agent Alexander Mahone in three seasons of Prison Break (2006–2009). In 2009, he co-presented the Vezina Trophy (for goaltending) at the National Hockey League awards show. He later guest starred as judge Christopher Mulready in The West Wing episode "The Supremes." He played the corrupt Gotham National Bank manager in the feature film The Dark Knight and the resistance leader Jurgen in Equilibrium.

In June 2009, Fichtner had a recurring role as TV producer Phil Yagoda on Entourage. He also voiced Master Sergeant Sandman in the 2011 video game Call of Duty: Modern Warfare 3. He also played Eric Sacks in Teenage Mutant Ninja Turtles (2014). In September 2024, it was reported that Fichtner had joined the cast of Talamasca: The Secret Order as Jasper in a series regular role. In January 2025, it was announced that Fichtner had joined the second season of Beef. In April, it was announced that Fichtner had joined the cast of Lucky.

On February 8, 2026, Fichtner appeared in a commercial for Kinder Bueno that aired during Super Bowl LX.

== Honors and awards ==
On May 18, 2008, Fichtner received an Honorary Doctorate of Humane Letters from Farmingdale State College, one of his alma maters. In his acceptance address, he credited Farmingdale admissions counselor Don Harvey with influencing Fichtner's decision to study acting. Harvey, who became a lifelong friend, took Fichtner to his first Broadway show.

== Personal life ==
Fichtner is a fan of the NFL team the Buffalo Bills and appeared in a commercial for them before the 2014 season. He narrated the ESPN 30 for 30 documentary Four Falls of Buffalo, chronicling their four consecutive Super Bowl appearances. He is also a fan of the Buffalo Sabres of the NHL.

He has been close friends with his Black Hawk Down co-stars Kim Coates and Eric Bana.

== Filmography ==
=== Film ===
Year	Title	Role	Notes	Reference(s)
1994	Quiz Show	Stage Manager		
1995	Virtuosity	William Wallace		
1995	Reckless	Rachel's Father		
1995	Strange Days	Officer Dwayne Engelman		
1995	Heat	Roger Van Zant		
1995	The Underneath	Tommy Dundee		
1996	Albino Alligator	Law		
1997	Contact	Kent Clarke		
1997	Switchback	Chief Jack McGinnis		
1998	Armageddon	Colonel Willie Sharp		
1999	Go	Burke Halverson		
1999	The Settlement	Jerry		
2000	The Perfect Storm	David "Sully" Sullivan		
2000	Drowning Mona	Phil Dearly		
2000	Passion of Mind	Aaron Reilly		
2000	Endsville	Prince Victor		
2001	Pearl Harbor	Mr. Walker		
2001	Black Hawk Down	Sergeant First Class Jeff Sanderson	Nominated—Phoenix Film Critics Society Award for Best Cast	
2001	What's the Worst That Could Happen?	Detective Alex Tardio		
2002	Julie Walking Home	Henry		
2002	Equilibrium	Jurgen		
2004	Crash	Jake Flanagan	Hollywood Film Festival Ensemble of the Year; Screen Actors Guild Award for Outstanding Performance by a Cast in a Motion Picture; Nominated—Gotham Independent Film Award for Best Ensemble Cast	
2005	Nine Lives	Andrew	Nominated—Gotham Independent Film Award for Best Ensemble Cast	
2005	The Chumscrubber	Dr. Bill Stifle		
2005	The Amateurs	Otis		
2005	The Longest Yard	Captain Brian Knauer		
2005	Mr. & Mrs. Smith	Dr. Wexler	Voice; uncredited	
2006	Ultraviolet	Garth		
2007	Blades of Glory	Darren MacElroy		
2007	First Snow	Ed		
2008	The Dark Knight	Bank Manager		
2010	Forehead Tittaes	Boss	Funny or Die sketch	
2010	Date Night	District Attorney Frank Crenshaw		
2011	The Big Bang	Detective Poley		
2011	Drive Angry	The Accountant		
2012	Wrong	Master Chang		
2012	St. Sebastian	Jurgens	Unreleased	
2013	Phantom	Alex Kozlov		
2013	The Lone Ranger	Butch Cavendish		
2013	Elysium	John Carlyle		
2014	The Homesman	Vester Belknap		
2014	Teenage Mutant Ninja Turtles	Eric Sacks / The Shredder		
2016	Independence Day: Resurgence	General Joshua T. Adams		
2016	American Wrestler: The Wizard	Coach Plyler		
2017	Hot Summer Nights	Shep		
2017	The Neighbor	Mike Prentis	Also producer	
2017	Krystal	Dr. Lyle Farley		
2018	12 Strong	Colonel John Mulholland		
2018	Traffik	Carl Waynewright		
2018	O.G.	Danvers		
2018	Armed	Richard		
2018	Cold Brook	Ted Markham	Also director and co-writer	
2018	All the Devil's Men	Mike Brennan		
2019	Josie & Jack	Joseph Raeburn		
2019	Finding Steve McQueen	Enzo Rotella		
2021	The Space Between	Donny Rumson		
2021	The Birthday Cake	Uncle Ricardo		
2023	Hypnotic	Lev Dellrayne		
2024	French Girl	Peter Kinski		
2025	The Sound	Conner		
2025	The Outer Threat	Sam		
TBA	That's Amore!	TBA	Post-production	
TBA	The Gettysburg Address	John George Nicolay	Voice; post-production	

=== Television ===
Year	Title	Role	Notes	Reference(s)
1987–1994, 2008–2010	As the World Turns	Rod Landry	79 episodes	
1989	A Man Called Hawk	Boros	2 episodes	
1989	Baywatch	Howard Ganza	Episode: "Rookie School"	
1994–1995	Grace Under Fire	Ryan Sparks	8 episodes	
1995	A Father for Charlie	Sheriff	Television film	
2002	MDs	Bruce Kellerman	10 episodes	
2004	The West Wing	Christopher Mulready	Episode: "The Supremes"	
2005	Empire Falls	Jimmy Minty	2 episodes	
2005	American Dad!	Harland	Voice; episode: "Homeland Insecurity"	
2005–2006	Invasion	Sheriff Tom Underlay	22 episodes	
2006–2009	Prison Break	Alexander Mahone	59 episodes	
2009–2011	Entourage	Phil Yagoda	13 episodes	
2010	Night and Day	Dan Hollister	Pilot	
2012	Seal Team Six: The Raid on Osama Bin Laden	Mr. Guidry	Television film	
2013–2014	Crossing Lines	Carl Hickman	22 episodes	
2015–2016	Empire	Jameson Henthrop	4 episodes	
2016–2021	Mom	Adam Janikowski	Recurring role (season 3), Main cast (seasons 4–8); 84 episodes	
2016	Shooter	Rathford O'Brien	Episode: "Killing Zone"	
2017	Porsche: Decades of Disruption	Narrator	Voice; documentary	
2017	Top Gear America	Himself	Host; 8 episodes	
2019	Veep	Felix Wade	Episode: "Discovery Weekend"	
2020	Corporate	Brett	Episode: "Fuck You Money"	
2022	Joe vs. Carole	Rick Kirkham	2 episodes	
2023	The Company You Keep	Leo Nicoletti	Main role; 10 episodes	
2025	Talamasca: The Secret Order	Jasper	Main role; 6 episodes	
2025	Defying Death on the Atlantic	Narrator	Voice; documentary	
2026	Beef	Troy	Recurring role (season 2); 6 episodes	
2026	Lucky	Wayne Whittaker	3 episodes	
2026	It's Florida, Man	TBA	Episode: "Cobra"	
2027	Bosch: Start of Watch	Calhern		
TBA	The Challenger	Richard Feynman		

=== Video games ===
Year	Title	Voice role	Notes	Reference(s)
2002	Grand Theft Auto: Vice City	Ken Rosenberg	Credited as Willian Fichtner	
2004	Grand Theft Auto: San Andreas	Ken Rosenberg	Credited as Bill Fichtner	
2008	Turok	Logan		
2011	Call of Duty: Modern Warfare 3	Master Sergeant Sandman		
2012	Infex	The Administrator		
2013	Disney Infinity	Butch Cavendish		
2014	Teenage Mutant Ninja Turtles	The Shredder	Nintendo 3DS version	
2021	Grand Theft Auto: The Trilogy – The Definitive Edition	Ken Rosenberg	Archival recordings Remasters of Grand Theft Auto: Vice City and Grand Theft Auto: San Andreas only	

== Awards and nominations ==
Year	Award	Category	Nominated work	Result	Ref.
2005	32nd Saturn Awards	Best Actor on Television	Invasion	Nominated	
2011	Buffalo Niagara Film Festival	Walk of Fame Trail of the Stars		Won	
2012	Fangoria Chainsaw Awards	Best Supporting Actor	Drive Angry	Nominated	
2017	Hollywood Reel Independent Film Festival	Best Actor	The Neighbor	Won	
2021	26th Critics' Choice Awards	Best Supporting Actor in a Comedy Series	Mom	Nominated	
2026	53rd Saturn Awards	Best Supporting Actor in a Television Series	Talamasca: The Secret Order	Nominated	
