= Aaron Harvey =

American film director and writer

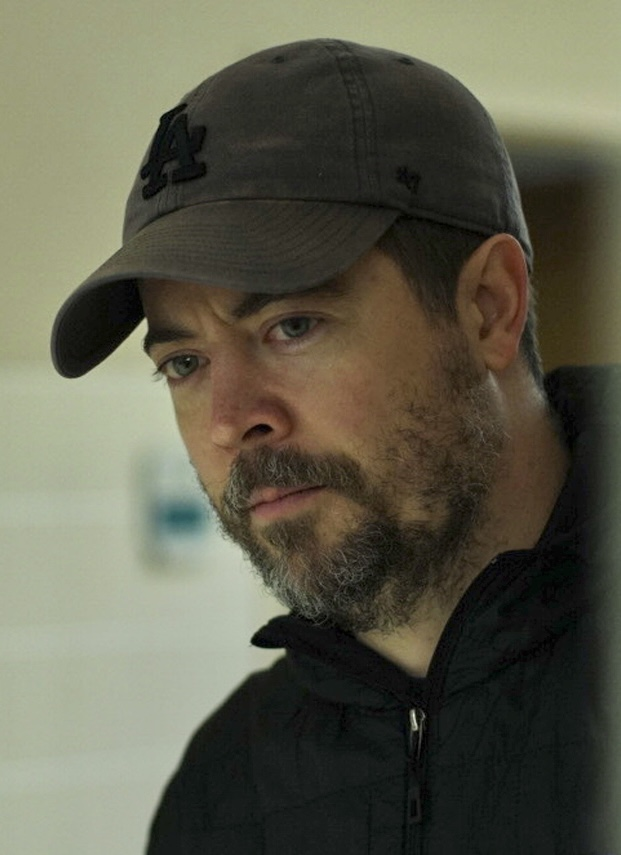
- Born: October 28, 1980 (age 45); Santa Ana, CA, U.S.
- Occupations: Film director, producer, writer
- Years active: 2010–present

Aaron Harvey (born October 28, 1980) is an American film director and writer. He wrote and directed the feature films Catch .44, The Neighbor, Into the Ashes and the upcoming Come With Me.

== Life and career ==
Harvey was born in Santa Ana, California but grew up in North Carolina. He moved to Los Angeles in 2005 to pursue filmmaking.

In 2010 he wrote and directed the feature film Catch .44 starring Malin Akerman, Forest Whitaker and Bruce Willis. The film was released theatrically on December 9, 2011 by Anchor Bay Entertainment. After completion of Catch .44, Harvey joined with Megan Ellison (who was a producer on Catch .44) and helped set up Annapurna Pictures. He worked at Annapurna Pictures for almost three years, before leaving to start his own production company, Michael Bruce Pictures and to direct his next feature film Last Days of Summer, which was ultimately re-titled The Neighbor.

The Neighbor premiered at the Rhode Island International Film Festival in 2016, where it won the festival's top prize, the "Best Narrative Feature" award. It subsequently played multiple other festivals, including the Newport Beach Film Festival, the Quebec City Film Festival and the Hollywood Reel Independent Film Festival, where it won both the "Best Director" and "Best Actor" prizes. The Los Angeles Times was also complimentary of the film, stating "The Neighbor finds a sturdy constant in its thoughtfully delineated performances and handsome production values." The film was picked up for distribution by Vertical Entertainment, who released the film theatrically on January 26, 2018.

After The Neighbor, Harvey wrote and directed the dramatic thriller Into the Ashes. The film was shot in Alabama and stars Luke Grimes, Frank Grillo, Robert Taylor and James Badge Dale. It was released theatrically on July 19, 2019 by RLJE Films. Richard Roeper, writing for the Chicago Sun Times, gave the film 3 out of 4 stars writing "while not all the pieces of the puzzle fit perfectly into place, it's still a good yarn filled with arresting visuals and solid performances."

His latest film, Come With Me, starring Theo Rossi and Ron Perlman, recently wrapped production in Mississippi.

== Filmography ==
Year	Title	Director	Writer	Producer
2011	Catch .44	Yes	Yes	No
2013	Echoes	No	No	Yes
2018	The Neighbor	Yes	Yes	Yes
2019	Into the Ashes	Yes	Yes	Yes
2026	Come With Me	Yes	Yes	Yes

Short films

- Tom and Janie (2009) - director, writer, editor, producer
- Idiot. (2013) - director, writer, editor, producer
