= Durant's Never Closes =

- Directed by: Travis Mills
- Written by: Travis Mills
- Produced by: Scott Conditt; Travis Mills
- Starring: Tom Sizemore; Michelle Stafford; Peter Bogdanovich; Jon Gries
- Cinematography: Nicholas Fornwalt
- Edited by: Rolo Tomassi
- Music by: Tyler Parkinson
- Production company: Running Wild Films
- Distributed by: Chamberlain Films; Prosperity Pictures
- Release date: 22 January 2016
- Running time: 80 minutes
- Country: United States
- Language: English

Durant's Never Closes is a 2016 American biographical mystery thriller film directed by Travis Mills, starring Tom Sizemore, Michelle Stafford, Peter Bogdanovich and Jon Gries. The film is based on Jack Durant, a restaurateur from Phoenix, Arizona.

== Cast ==
- Tom Sizemore as Jack Durant
- Michelle Stafford as Suzie
- Peter Bogdanovich as George
- Jon Gries as Dizzy Dean
- Mark Grossman as College Kid
- Bill Wetherill as Truck Driver
- Kristi Lawrence as Food Critic
- Rob Edwards as Rude Man
- Frank Prell as Bus Boy
- Travis Mills as Investigator
- Greg Lutz as Doctor
- Barbara McBain as B.J. Thompson

== Release ==
The film was released in the United States on 22 January 2016.

== Reception ==
John Townsend of Starburst rated the film 5 stars out of 10 and wrote that at the film's "occasional best", it is an "eye-catching one man show", but at its worst feels "plodding and slow, with curious tonal shifts".

Bill Goodykoontz of The Arizona Republic rated the film 2.5 stars out of 5 and called Mills' direction "assured" and the film's "high point", writing that he "stages scenes with skill", while Sizemore is "all over the place as Durant".

Robrt L. Pela of Phoenix New Times wrote that the film "plays like a frenetic fever dream, with a rambling narrative that never gets going", but praised Sizemore's performance, writing that "What might have been a laughable caricature becomes instead an extra-human performance."
