= Come with Me (film) =

2026 film by Aaron Harvey

Come With Me
- Directed by: Aaron Harvey
- Screenplay by: Aaron Harvey; Jonathan Croom
- Produced by: Demetrius Stear; Aaron Harvey; Colin Bates; Kevin Greene
- Starring: Theo Rossi; Ron Perlman; Kate French; Ronnie Gene Blevins
- Cinematography: Ben Joyner
- Edited by: Jacob Kirby
- Music by: James Curd
- Production companies: A Mind's Eye; Michael Bruce Pictures
- Distributed by: Vertical Entertainment (North America)
- Release dates: April 26, 2026 (Beverly Hills Film Festival); September 4, 2026 (United States)
- Running time: 107 minutes
- Country: United States
- Language: English

Come With Me is a 2026 American drama film about a working-class man named Simon Ward (Theo Rossi), who falls under the spell of a rhetoric spewing radio host played by Ron Perlman. The film, directed by Aaron Harvey and written by Harvey and Jonathan Croom, follows Rossi's character as his life slowly unravels around him.

== Cast ==
- Theo Rossi as Simon Ward
- Ron Perlman as Dalton Kirby
- Ronnie Gene Blevins as Gary Parker
- Kate French as Rebecca Randall
- Michael Sirow as Dave
- Marion Kerr as Angela Parker
- Jay Huguley as Peter Ellis

== Production ==
Principal photography concluded in September 2024, in Mississippi.

== Release ==
The film premiered at the Beverly Hills Film Festival on April 18 and it was released theatrically on September 4, 2026, by Vertical Entertainment.

== Reception ==
The film debuted to 100% on Rotten Tomatoes and was widely praised by critics.

Writing for Film Threat, Alex Saveliev gave the film an 8/10, commenting "it’s a rare thing, indeed, to witness such a coherent, powerful, understated cinematic achievement."
