= The Neighbor (2017 film) =

2018 thriller film directed by Aaron Harvey

- Theatrical release poster
- Directed by: Aaron Harvey
- Written by: Aaron Harvey; Richard Byard
- Produced by: Robert Ogden Barnum; William Fichtner; Aaron Harvey; Oliver Ridge
- Starring: William Fichtner; Jessica McNamee; Jean Louisa Kelly; Michael Rosenbaum; Colin Woodell; Erich Anderson
- Cinematography: John W. Rutland
- Music by: James Curd
- Production companies: Michael Bruce Pictures; Blood Moon Creative
- Distributed by: Vertical Entertainment
- Release dates: April 23, 2017 (Newport Beach Film Festival); January 26, 2018 (United States)
- Running time: 97 minutes
- Country: United States
- Language: English
- Budget: $500,000 (estimated)

The Neighbor (also known as Last Days of Summer) is a 2018 American psychological thriller film co-written, produced and directed by Aaron Harvey. The film stars William Fichtner as Mike, a technical writer who sees his life shaken by the arrival of new, younger neighbors.

The Neighbor premiered at the 2016 Rhode Island International Film Festival where it won the festival's top prize for "Best Narrative Feature". It was released theatrically in the United States on January 26, 2018, by Vertical Entertainment.

== Summary ==
Mike Prentis (William Fichtner) is a middle-aged man in a routine marriage, who works from home as a technical writer. When a new couple moves in next door, Mike quickly befriends the young Jenna (Jessica McNamee) and her car-dealer husband, Scott (Michael Rosenbaum). Working from home, Mike has plenty of time to pay attention to Jenna who slowly begins to reveal the details of her life with Scott, and the fact that all isn't as carefree as Scott would like it to appear. While Mike watches as the young couple's relationship begins to unravel, his own marriage starts coming apart at the seams. Mike's wife Lisa (Jean Louisa Kelly) sees Mike's attraction to Jenna forming and pulls further away from him – pushing their own relationship to the breaking point. Compounding the fact is Mike's son Alex (Colin Woodell), who returns from college and forms an unwitting friendship with Jenna, much to the disdain of his father.

As Mike witnesses the perceived abuse of Jenna at the hands of Scott increasing, he makes one last dramatic and misguided effort to intervene.

== Cast ==
- William Fichtner as Mike
- Jessica McNamee as Jenna
- Jean Louisa Kelly as Lisa
- Michael Rosenbaum as Scott
- Colin Woodell as Alex
- Erich Anderson as Brian
- Robert Artz as Bar Patron

== Release ==
=== Reception ===
The film premiered at the 2016 Rhode Island International Film Festival where it won the "Grand Prize, Best Narrative Feature" award". It went on to play multiple other festivals, including the Quebec City Film Festival, the Newport Beach Film Festival and the Hollywood Reel Independent Film Festival where it won both "Best Director" and "Best Actor" awards.

Michael Rechtshaffen from the Los Angeles Times gave the film a good review writing: "Aaron Harvey's The Neighbor finds a sturdy constant in its thoughtfully delineated performances and handsome production values. Harvey's contained direction and John W. Rutland's impressive cinematography provide a sharply observed continuity that's as admirably contained as the Prentices' impeccably appointed, if spiritually anemic, home." J.R. Southall gave the film 6 out of 10 and said: "The Neighbour... is just about absorbing enough to hold your attention until its powerful but bleak finale. But only just." Niall Browne from "Movies In Focus" gave The Neighbour three stars out of five and stated: "A slow-burning domestic thriller, Aaron Harvey's The Neighbour is a tense little movie with a captivating central performance from William Fichtner."

Author Stephen King tweeted of the film, "The Neighbor, now streaming: Low-key, but what a bravura performance from William Fichtner, one of America's great unsung actors."

=== Accolades ===
The Neighbor received several awards and nominations.

Award	Subject	Nominee	Result	Ref.
Beloit International Film Festival	Director of Programming Award	Aaron Harvey; Oliver Ridge	Won	
Hollywood Reel Independent Film Festival	Best Actor	William Fichtner	Won	
Hollywood Reel Independent Film Festival	Best Director	Aaron Harvey	Won	
Newport Beach Film Festival	Best Film – Jury Award	Aaron Harvey; Oliver Ridge	Nominated	
Rhode Island International Film Festival	Best Feature Film	Aaron Harvey; Oliver Ridge	Won	
Whistler Film Festival	Narrative Feature – Audience Award	Aaron Harvey; Oliver Ridge	Nominated	
