= Steven Brand =

Scottish actor, director and producer

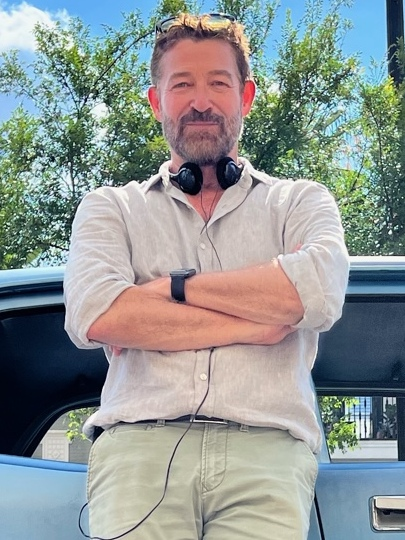
- Brand in 2022
- Born: 1969 (age 56–57); Dundee, Scotland
- Citizenship: United Kingdom
- Occupations: Actor; director
- Agent: Global Artists Agency
- Known for: The Scorpion King (2002); Teen Wolf

Steven Brand (born 1969) is a Scottish actor. His feature debut was The Scorpion King (2002), where he portrayed Memnon. He has made many guest appearances on television series, and in 2015 Brand was nominated for Best Guest Starring Role on Television at the Saturn Awards for his performance in Teen Wolf.

== Career ==
After several minor roles in television series, Brand made his feature film debut in The Scorpion King (2002). He starred as Memnon, the main antagonist of the protagonist Mathayus (Dwayne Johnson). Brand also voiced Alexander Anderson and Richard Hellsing in the English dubs of Hellsing and Hellsing Ultimate.

Brand played lawyer Ned Baker in Saving Lincoln (2013) before starring in the horror film Echoes the following year. In 2015, Brand was nominated for the Best Guest Starring Role on Television at the Saturn Awards for his performance in Teen Wolf as Dr. Gabriel Valack. He has narrated over fifty audiobooks.

Brand directed the television film He’s Watching for MarVista Entertainment. He portrayed Marsh in "24/7", the fifth episode of The Sandman (2022).

Brand directed and produced the noir film Joe Baby, starring Dichen Lachman, Willa Fitzgerald, Harvey Keitel and Ron Perlman, in his directorial debut. Based on a novel by Drew Fine, it was released in 2023. After production in Mississippi ended in June 2022, Brand appeared in Saw X (2023) as Parker Sears. He is represented by Global Artists Agency.

== Filmography ==
=== Film ===
List of films and roles
| Year | Title | Role | Notes |
|---|---|---|---|
| 1994 | Beyond Bedlam | Turnball | |
| 2002 | The Scorpion King | Memnon | |
| 2007 | Treasure Raiders | Michael Nazzaro | |
| 2007 | Say It in Russian | Andrew Lamont | |
| 2008 | Stone & Ed | Mr. Black | |
| 2008 | XII | Agent Naughton | |
| 2008 | The Human Contract | Boyd | |
| 2011 | Hellraiser: Revelations | Ross Craven | |
| 2013 | Saving Lincoln | Ned Baker | |
| 2013 | The Cloth | Father Johnson | |
| 2014 | Telling of the Shoes | Blaine | |
| 2014 | Echoes | Paul Wagner | |
| 2016 | Trial | Connor | |
| 2017 | Mayhem | John 'The Boss' Towers | |
| 2017 | Demons | Eddie | |
| 2019 | Safe Inside | Richard | |
| 2023 | Joe Baby | N/A | Directed and produced |
| 2023 | Saw X | Parker Sears | |

=== Television ===
List of television appearances and roles
| Year | Title | Role | Notes |
|---|---|---|---|
| 1993 | The Darling Buds of May | Tom Sargent | Guest role (4 episodes) |
| 1994–95 | Casualty | Adam Cooke | Recurring role (series 9) |
| 1998 | Taggart | Peter Letham | "Dead Reckoning" |
| 1998 | Babes in the Wood | Gary | "1.4" |
| 1999 | Wing and a Prayer | Stewart Patterson | "2.5" |
| 1999 | The Bill | Mervyn Castle | "Sleeping with the Enemy" |
| 1999 | Psychos | Iain Telfer | TV miniseries |
| 1999 | Love in the 21st Century | Peter | TV series |
| 2000 | Heartbeat | Dr. Ian Peters | "The Good Doctor" |
| 2000–01 | Doctors | Chris Rawlings | Recurring role (series 2) |
| 2001 | The Savages | Richard | "The Ex Files" |
| 2001 | The Mind of the Married Man | Andrew | TV series |
| 2001–02 | Hellsing | Alexander Anderson (voice) | Main role |
| 2003 | The Diary of Ellen Rimbauer | John Rimbauer | TV miniseries |
| 2003 | Mystery Woman | Elliot McCallister | TV film |
| 2004 | CSI: Crime Scene Investigation | Dr. Malaga | "Crow's Feet" |
| 2004 | Inactive Life | Whit Gagne | "Caught", "Not Fade Away", "Gravity" |
| 2005 | McBride: The Chameleon Murder | Hanson Collier | TV film |
| 2005 | NCIS | Ian 'Bulldog' Hitch | "Pop Life" |
| 2005 | Alien Express | Paul Fitzpatrick | TV film |
| 2005–06 | Point Pleasant | Graham | "Missing", "Let the War Commence", "Mother's Day" |
| 2006–2011 | Hellsing Ultimate | Alexander Anderson / Richard Hellsing (voice) | Recurring role |
| 2007 | The Nine | Mark | "You're Being Watched" |
| 2007 | Shark | Eli Weber | "In Absentia" |
| 2008 | Samurai Girl | Severin | TV miniseries |
| 2008 | The Apostles | Howard Davidson | TV film |
| 2009 | CSI: Miami | Patrick Garrety | "Target Specific" |
| 2009 | Mistresses | Jack Hudson | Recurring role (season 2) |
| 2009 | 90210 | Jason Epstein | "To New Beginnings!" |
| 2010 | Covert Affairs | James Elliot | "Walter's Walk" |
| 2010 | NCIS: Los Angeles | Jon Craig | "Black Widow" |
| 2010 | Triassic Attack | Sheriff Jake Roundtree | TV film |
| 2011 | Human Target | Marshall Pucci | "Marshall Pucci" |
| 2011 | The Cabin | Conor MacDougal | TV film |
| 2012 | Castle | Trevor Haynes | "Dial M for Mayor" |
| 2012 | Magic City | Cliff Wells | "Castles Made of Sand", "Time and Tide" |
| 2012 | The Asset | Sean McDevitt | TV film |
| 2014 | Men at Work | David | "Post-Posal" |
| 2014 | Enormous | Hopkins | "Enormous" |
| 2014 | Galyntine | Britt | TV film |
| 2014–2016 | Teen Wolf | Dr. Gabriel Valack | Recurring role (seasons 4–5) |
| 2015 | Secrets and Lies | Joseph Richardson | Recurring role (season 1) |
| 2015 | The Syndicate | Eddie Garcia | "3.1", "3.2" |
| 2016 | Accidental Switch | Conner | TV film |
| 2016 | New Blood | Paul Douglas | "Case 3: Parts 1 & 2" |
| 2016 | Agatha Raisin | Inspector Jessop | "Witch of Wyckhadden" |
| 2016 | No Tomorrow | Hamish Stegner Sr. | "No Soup for You" |
| 2017 | The Same Sky | Howard Cutter | TV miniseries |
| 2017 | Hawaii Five-0 | John Walcott | "Kau pahi, ko'u kua. Kau pu, ko'u po'o" |
| 2020 | Alex Rider | Michael Roscoe | 2 episodes |
| 2022 | The Sandman | Marsh Janowski | "24/7" |
| 2023 | Vikings: Valhalla | Vitomir | 3 episodes |

=== Video games ===
List of voice roles in video games
| Year | Title | Role | Notes |
|---|---|---|---|
| 2011 | Star Wars: The Old Republic | Darth Mortis, Kel'eth Ur, Colonel Valda | Voice role |
| 2013 | Star Wars: The Old Republic – Rise of the Hutt Cartel | Additional voices | |
| 2015 | The Order: 1886 | Commissioner Doyle, Lord Dunglass | Voice role |
| 2019 | Star Wars: The Old Republic – Onslaught | Additional voices | |
| 2021 | Call of Duty: Vanguard | Henry Baker | Voice and likeness |
| 2023 | Immortals of Aveum | Sandrak | Voice role |
