= Psychonaut (film) =

- Directed by: Thijs Meuwese
- Written by: Thijs Meuwese
- Produced by: Thijs Meuwese; David Grover; Monne Tuinhout
- Starring: Julia Batelaan; Fiona Dourif
- Cinematography: Jasper Verkaart
- Release date: October 23, 2024 (Brooklyn Horror Film Festival)
- Country: Netherlands
- Language: English

Psychonaut is a 2024 Dutch science fiction film directed by Thijs Meuwese and starring Julia Batelaan and Fiona Dourif.

== Plot ==
A futuristic healing machine capable of piercing into one's memories is Maxime's only hope to save her dying girlfriend. Along with the help of her mother Samantha (Fiona Dourif), the only person she knows that can operate the machine, Max must traverse into the dark recesses of her lover's mind in order to locate the "essential memory" that could save her life, all the while being hunted by a man they presumed to be dead.

== Cast ==
- Julia Batelaan as Max
- Fiona Dourif as Samantha
- Yasmin Blake as Dylan
- Lloydd Hamwijk as Bogdan

== Release ==
The film premiered at the Brooklyn Horror Film Festival on October 23, 2024.

== Reception ==
Andrew Mack of ScreenAnarchy gave the film a positive review and wrote, "When you boil it down Psychonaut is about this: Love heals all wounds."

Daniel Kurland of Bloody Disgusting awarded the film two and a half "skulls" out of five.

Jenika McCrayer at MovieJawn gave a positive review and wrote, “The mostly black-and-white film has stunning gothic imagery, powerful performances, and tender moments. I was left hoping we can both save Dylan and Maxime’s relationship with her mother.”
