= Bonnie Morgan =

American actress and contortionist

- Born: Bonnie Patricia Morgan; 27 April 1981 (age 45); Los Angeles, California, U.S.
- Occupations: Actress, contortionist

Bonnie Patricia Morgan is a female contortionist and actress.

== Early life ==
Morgan was born to actor Gary Morgan and grew up in a family of circus performers. She has a sister, Molly, who is also an actress. She is a professional body manipulator, and has performed as a clown and studied as a classical actor.

== Career ==
Becoming a professional contortionist, Morgan has appeared in many known movies such as Piranha 3D, Minority Report, Fright Night and has made an appearance as Beth in the short film Sorority Pillow Fight (alongside Michelle Rodriguez). She also provided stunts in Hellboy II: The Golden Army, for which she was nominated for Screen Actors Guild Award for Outstanding Performance by a Stunt Ensemble in a Motion Picture, and in the William Brent Bell's documentary-style horror film The Devil Inside. She acted as well in several commercial spots and holds a record registered in the Guinness World Records having spent around three minutes with two other people in a box of two by two foot.

Morgan is also known for her role as Samara Morgan, the antagonist of The Ring franchise, portraying the role in Rings and in stunts for The Ring Two.

In 2018, Morgan guest starred as a contortionist and henchwoman named Colette in the Netflix Original Series, A Series of Unfortunate Events. She returned to the role for the series' third and final season the following year.

== Filmography ==
=== Film ===
Year	Title	Role	Notes
1994	The Magic of the Golden Bear: Goldy III	Jessie	
2000	How the Grinch Stole Christmas	Pudding Head Who	Uncredited
2001	Bubble Boy	Rubber Woman	
2002	Van Wilder	Twisted Auditioner	Uncredited
2002	Minority Report	Contortionist	
2003	Peter Pan	Fairy	Uncredited
2005	The Ring Two	Samara Morgan	Stunts only
2008	The Burrowers	Burrower #1	
2009	Transylmania	Woman Contortionist	
2010	Piranha 3D	Sorority Girl (Inner-tube)	Cameo
2011	The Arcadian	Sculpture	
2011	Fright Night	Vamp #1	Cameo
2012	The Devil Inside	Rosa Sorlini	Supporting role
2014	Fear Clinic	Paige	
2015	The Last Witch Hunter	Witch Attacker #1	
2016	Bedeviled	Grandmother	
2017	Rings	Samara Morgan	

=== Television ===
Year	Title	Role	Notes
1990	Lenny	Little Girl	Episode: "Yes, Virginity, There Is a God"
1992	Quantum Leap	Cindy	Episode: "The Last Gunfighter - November 28, 1957"
1992	Blossom	Katherine	Episode: "I Killed Chico Barranca"
1994	The Nanny	Brooke	Episode: "The Playwright"
1994	Sister, Sister	Contortionist	Episode: "Mothers and Other Strangers"
1996	Dr. Quinn, Medicine Woman	Rosemary Hart	Episode: "Eye for an Eye"
1996	Step by Step	Tina	Episode: "Do the Right Thing"
2001	CSI: Crime Scene Investigation	Alice Neely	Episode: "Sounds of Silence"
2002	Providence	Contortionist	Episode: "Things Have Changed"
2003–2004	Passions	Tabitha's Cousin / Drug Addict	3 episodes
2005	All That	Mee Maw	3 episodes
2005	George Lopez	Contortionist	Episode: "George Buys a Vow"
2005	The Suite Life of Zack & Cody	Contortionist	Episode: "A Prom Story"
2005–2006	Zoey 101		2 episodes
2008	Mind of Mencia	Ashley Olsen	1 episode
2008	Terminator: The Sarah Connor Chronicles	Rosie	Uncredited; Episode: "The Tower Is Tall But the Fall Is Short"
2010	Castle	Sophie Ronson	Uncredited; Episode: "A Rose for Everafter"
2010	Big Time Rush	Acrobat	Episode: "Big Time Party"
2010	No Ordinary Family	Store Clerk	Episode: "No Ordinary Quake"
2011	Shameless	Teresa	Episode: "Three Boys"
2011	A.N.T. Farm	Svetlana	3 episodes
2012	It's Always Sunny in Philadelphia	Twisted McPoyle #134	Episode: "The Maureen Ponderosa Wedding Massacre"
2012–2013	Criminal Minds	Marionette #126 / Marionette #114	2 episodes
2013	CSI: Crime Scene Investigation	Melodie Davis	Episode: "Helpless"
2015–2016	Blunt Talk	Contortionist	2 episodes
2017	Fameless		Episode: "Host Busters"
2017	Hap and Leonard	Judy Punch	Episode: "Pie a la Mojo"
2017	Star Trek: Discovery	Crepuscula	Episode: "The Vulcan Hello"
2018-2019	A Series of Unfortunate Events	Colette	3 episodes

== Accolades ==
Award	Year	Category	Nominated work	Result
Actor Awards	2009	Outstanding Performance by a Stunt Ensemble in a Motion Picture	Hellboy II: The Golden Army	Nominated
