= Blood Is Blood =

2016 film directed by Stuart Sauvarin

- Directed by: Stuart Sauvarin
- Written by: Stuart Sauvarin
- Produced by: Noah C. Haeussner
- Starring: Fiona Dourif; Daniel DiTomasso; Kate French; Caitlin Harris; Teni Panosian
- Music by: Tobias Enhus
- Distributed by: Multicom Entertainment Group & ThrillGoreTV
- Release date: September 1, 2016
- Running time: 82 minutes

Blood Is Blood is a 2016 horror film written and directed by Stuart Sauvarin and starring Fiona Dourif, Andrew James Allen, Daniel DiTomasso, Kate French, Caitlin Harris, and Teni Panosian. It was released across Digital HD and VOD, on September 1, 2016.

== Plot ==
For four privileged siblings Brie, Daniel, Crew, and Jess, family has always come first. But when Crew (Daniel DiTomasso) invites his girlfriend Sara (Kate French) into the family, distrust begins to bubble between the siblings. Seeing Sara as a threat, Brie grows spiteful and suspicious that she is being replaced. That is until the night Crew attempts to murder her in their family house. Traumatized, Brie is sent to a mental facility where she is tormented by hallucinations of Crew from the night of the attack. But when the visions begin to bleed into reality, Brie starts to fear that it is not just her sanity that' i in danger, and she flees the facility. In a frantic attempt to return to her remaining siblings and warn them, Brie begins to uncover a trail of gory, sinister secrets that leads her to question whether she knows her family as well as she thought.

== Cast ==
- Fiona Dourif as Brie
- Andrew James Allen as Daniel
- Daniel DiTomasso as Crew
- Kate French as Sara
- Barbara Eve Harris as Dr. Sprague
- Caitlin Harris as Jess
- Teni Panosian as Peni
- Tessa Harnetiaux as Lauren

== Release ==
The film was released across Digital HD and VOD, on September 1, 2016.

== Reception ==
Preview screenings were largely well received. A review from Wicked Channel.com called the movie "a giant mind fuck." saying, that "Every Time, you feel you understand what is going on and are starting to figure out where it could be heading." farsightedblog.com said that "Blood is Blood is a movie after my own soul."
