= Into the Ashes =

2019 thriller film directed by Aaron Harvey

Into The Ashes
- Theatrical release poster
- Directed by: Aaron Harvey
- Written by: Aaron Harvey
- Produced by: Robert Ogden Barnum; Jamin O'Brien; Aaron Harvey; Daniel Blanc
- Starring: Luke Grimes; Frank Grillo; Robert Taylor; James Badge Dale; Marguerite Moreau; Brady Smith
- Cinematography: John W. Rutland
- Edited by: Richard Byard
- Music by: James Curd
- Production companies: Michael Bruce Pictures; The Film Community
- Distributed by: RLJE Films
- Release date: July 19, 2019
- Running time: 98 minutes
- Country: United States
- Language: English
- Box office: $9,687

Into The Ashes is a 2019 American action thriller film written, produced and directed by Aaron Harvey, starring Luke Grimes, Frank Grillo, Robert Taylor, James Badge Dale and Marguerite Moreau. It was released theatrically in the United States on July 19, 2019, by RLJE Films.

== Plot ==
The film follows Nick, a blue-collar ex-con who lives in a small town in the Alabama countryside. When Sloan, an insidious figure from his past, shows up and kills his wife, it sends Nick's world into a tailspin. Hell-bent on revenge, he tracks down Sloan and his gang, all the while having to deal with his father-in-law, the local sheriff Frank, who is forced to wrestle with his own morality in the midst of his daughter's murder. When Nick and Frank's paths finally cross after Nick has exacted his revenge, Frank has to make a final decision: whether to compromise his ethical standpoint and let Nick go, or continue to abide by the rules of the law which govern his conduct.

== Cast ==
- Luke Grimes as Nick Brenner
- Frank Grillo as Sloan
- Marguerite Moreau as Tara Brenner
- Robert Taylor as Frank Parson
- James Badge Dale as Sal Porter
- Andrea Frankle as Marlene Porter
- Brady Smith as Brad Engels
- Dave Maldonado as Jordan
- Jeff Pope as Junior
- David Cade as Charlie
- Scott Peat as Bruce
- Rob Mello as Forchet

== Production ==
It was announced in January 2018 that Luke Grimes, Frank Grillo and Robert Taylor were to star, with Aaron Harvey writing and directing the film. Further casting continued in January 2018 with James Badge Dale, Marguerite Moreau, Scott Peat, David Cade and Brady Smith joining the cast. Filming began that month in Birmingham, Alabama.

== Release ==
The film was released in theaters on July 19, 2019, by RLJE Films.

== Reception ==
Richard Roeper, writing for the Chicago Sun Times, gave the film 3 out of 4 stars writing "while not all the pieces of the puzzle fit perfectly into place, it's still a good yarn filled with arresting visuals and solid performances." Douglas Davidson of Elements of Madness gave the film a positive review, stating "With proper expectations, Aaron Harvey’s Into the Ashes is an engaging, well-performed, introspective crime thriller."
