= Gutshot Straight =

- Official movie poster
- Directed by: Justin Steele
- Written by: Jerry Rapp
- Produced by: Tiago Mesquita; Ross Otterman; John Yang
- Starring: George Eads; AnnaLynne McCord; Stephen Lang; Tia Carrere; Ted Levine; Steven Seagal; Vinnie Jones
- Cinematography: Tiago Mesquita
- Edited by: Emily Butler McDonald; Melissa Lawson; Sean Ludan
- Music by: Keith Waggoner
- Production companies: Jay-X Entertainment; Noordinay Films; AMJ Productions
- Distributed by: Grindstone Entertainment Group; Lionsgate Home Entertainment
- Release date: December 2, 2014
- Running time: 85 minutes
- Country: United States
- Language: English

Gutshot Straight is a 2014 American direct-to-video action film directed by Justin Steele, and starring George Eads, AnnaLynne McCord, Stephen Lang, Steven Seagal, Tia Carrere, Vinnie Jones, Ted Levine and Fiona Dourif.

== Plot ==
Jack is a professional poker player who gets involved with the underworld after taking a wager proposed by gambler Duffy. In order to protect his family and himself, Jack must outwit Duffy's brother Lewis and scheming wife May, each of whom is trying to force him to murder the other. Jack seeks the help of Paulie Trunks, a loan shark who is looking to collect on Jack's poker debts and wants to protect his investment.

== Cast ==
- George Eads as Jack Daniel
- AnnaLynne McCord as May Sereglia
- Stephen Lang as Duffy Sereglia
- Steven Seagal as Paulie "Trunks"
- Tia Carrere as Leanne
- Vinnie Jones as Carl
- Ted Levine as Lewis Sereglia
- Fiona Dourif as Gina
- Elsie Fisher as Stephanie Daniel
- John Lewis as Nico
- Daniel Aldema as Forrest
- Mark D. Espinoza as Schmidt
- Loni Love as Ms. Love
- Katie Lanigan as Stace
- John Rushing as Pete

== Production ==
The movie was filmed in Las Vegas, Nevada.
