= Catch .44 =

2011 crime thriller film by Aaron Harvey

- Theatrical release poster
- Directed by: Aaron Harvey
- Written by: Aaron Harvey
- Produced by: Randall Emmett; Michael Benaroya; Megan Ellison
- Starring: Forest Whitaker; Bruce Willis; Malin Åkerman; Nikki Reed; Deborah Ann Woll; Shea Whigham; Brad Dourif
- Cinematography: Jeff Cutter
- Edited by: Richard Byard
- Production companies: Annapurna Pictures; Emmett/Furla Films; Benaroya Pictures
- Distributed by: Anchor Bay Films
- Release date: December 9, 2011
- Running time: 94 minutes
- Country: United States
- Language: English
- Budget: $10.4 million
- Box office: $291,742

Catch .44 is a 2011 American crime thriller film written and directed by Aaron Harvey and starring Forest Whitaker, Bruce Willis, Malin Åkerman, Nikki Reed, Deborah Ann Woll, and Brad Dourif.

== Plot ==
Drug boss Mel sends his associates Tes, Dawn, and Kara to intercept a truck driver bringing rival drugs to a diner at night. The women wait for the driver at the diner, but when they fail to identify him, they draw guns on the diner's other occupants and demand if anyone knows who the driver is. Instead, a shootout ensues when Francine, the diner's owner, and Jesse, a patron, draw firearms of their own. Kara, Francine, Dawn, and Jesse are killed and Tes finds herself in a standoff with Billy, the diner's cook. As Tes and Billy point their weapons at each other, their situation becomes more complicated when Ronny, another associate of Mel's, arrives at the diner.

It is eventually revealed that no drugs were coming to the diner and the job was a set-up. Mel hired Billy, Jesse, and Francine, who all work for him, to kill Tes and her cohorts. Ronny, who is infatuated with Tes, says he came to the diner to rescue her and steal the money Mel supposedly gave Billy for this assignment, although Billy denies having it. Ronny orders Tes to shoot Billy, but she turns her gun on Ronny, and a second shootout occurs.

Mel comes to the diner and discovers Ronny is apparently the only survivor of the gunfight. After a brief conversation, Mel shoots Ronny in the face. However, Tes turns out to still be alive and guns Mel down. She then intercepts a car carrying Mel's money and drives off with the cash.

== Cast ==
- Malin Åkerman as Tes
- Bruce Willis as Mel
- Forest Whitaker as Ronny
- Nikki Reed as Kara
- Deborah Ann Woll as Dawn
- Shea Whigham as Billy
- Brad Dourif as Sheriff Connors
- Jimmy Lee Jr. as Jesse
- Jill Stokesberry as Francine
- PJ Marshall as Deputy
- Dan Silver as Businessman David
- Michael Rosenbaum as Brandon
- Edrick Browne as Davon

== Production ==
Shooting started on July 8, 2010, in Louisiana, and lasted 20 days.

Early on, there were several changes to the cast, particularly within the female lead roles. Maggie Grace was originally attached to play Tes, and Lauren German was attached to play Kara, however both women had to drop out due to scheduling conflicts. Laura Ramsey was also considered for the role of Dawn.

After Malin Åkerman signed on to play Tes, Bruce Willis and Forest Whitaker were attached to the film. Lizzy Caplan and Kate Mara were then brought on as Dawn and Kara, respectively. However, a few days later, Caplan dropped out and was replaced with Deborah Ann Woll for the role of Dawn. Mara dropped out of the movie as well, due to scheduling conflicts, and was replaced by Nikki Reed, thus completing the cast.

The film features art by Dallas-based artist Elisa Guardiola.

== Distribution ==
The rights to Catch .44 were picked up by Anchor Bay Films. Independent film producer Cassian Elwes brokered the deal.

== Box office ==
As of November 11, 2022, Catch .44 grossed $291,742 in the United Arab Emirates, South Africa, the Netherlands, Belgium, and Portugal, on a budget of $10.4 million.

== Reception ==
Neil Genzlinger of The New York Times gave the film 2 out of 5, and wrote: "A drug-deal tale featuring top-drawer actors trying to have fun with a medium-strength script. Sometimes they succeed, but not often enough to elevate the film to Pulp Fiction territory." Writing for The Hollywood Reporter, Duane Byrge said: "There's some fun, cheeky inside stuff – Bruce Willis wailing 'Respect' – which might make for hilarity in talent agency screening rooms, but that's about the most favorable demographic this low-caliber oddity will attract."
