= Fear Clinic (film) =

- Theatrical release poster
- Directed by: Robert Green Hall
- Written by: Aaron Drane, Robert Green Hall
- Produced by: Mark Benton Johnson
- Starring: Robert Englund; Fiona Dourif; Felisha Terrell; Cleopatra Coleman; Corey Taylor; Kevin Gage; Angelina Armani; Thomas Dekker
- Cinematography: Joseph White
- Edited by: Sherwood Jones
- Music by: Jason M. Hall
- Production companies: Bearing Entertainment; Dry County Films; Fear Chamber Productions
- Distributed by: Anchor Bay Entertainment
- Release dates: October 22, 2014 (Screamfest Horror Film Festival); February 10, 2015
- Running time: 90 minutes
- Country: United States
- Language: English
- Budget: $1 million

Fear Clinic is a 2014 horror film by Robert Green Hall, based upon the web series of the same name. The movie, which was partially funded through crowdsourcing, stars Robert Englund as a psychiatrist that tries to cure phobias by using extreme methods. The film received its world premiere on 22 October 2014 at the Screamfest Horror Film Festival and was released on DVD in the United States on 10 February 2015.

== Plot ==
Sara (Fiona Dourif) is one of five people that developed PTSD after surviving a bloody shooting attack in a small diner by a masked shooter, which had the unfortunate side effect of either worsening pre-existing phobias or developing new ones. Like the others, she sought treatment from Dr. Andover (Robert Englund), a brilliant scientist and doctor that developed a new way of treating fear-related ailments by way of his "Fear Chamber". Initially the treatments seemed to be a success, but years later the patients have all returned to the clinic due to their fears re-emerging worse than they had before. After urging from her best friend Megan (Cleopatra Coleman), Sara returns to the clinic as well. Andover is reluctant to resume treatment because one of his previous patients, Paige (Bonnie Morgan), died as a result of her treatment in the Fear Chamber. He ends up giving in due to both the patients and his assistant Osborn (Felisha Terrell) insistence that this is the only way to solve their problems. However he finds that his reluctance may have been well-founded as one of the patients, Caylee (Angelina Armani), vomits a black substance that gives Andover a strange vision once he touches the fluid. The vision shows a monstrous version of Paige that states that Andover's treatments opened a passage for a sinister being to come over and that all that it needs to finish its travels is for Andover to resume treatment and "open the door". Realizing that this is not Paige but the creature itself, he is shocked back to consciousness.

While settling in, a new patient by the name of Blake (Thomas Dekker) arrives in the clinic. His mother reveals that he was also one of the victims of the shooting, but that he had only recently began to develop severe night terrors that she believes are related to the attack. Blake is unable to communicate with others due to a head wound that left him with a brain injury that has limited his mobility and made him need a wheelchair. Andover begins treatment on Blake, which they discover has the unintended side effect of healing his brain injury and giving him the ability to speak once more. This, along with his earlier vision of Paige, makes Andover believe that something sinister is at work and that Blake's miraculous healing only occurred so he could once more feel fear, which the creature needs to exist. Megan, who had previously checked herself in the clinic before and has now done it again to be with Sara, has a small cyst on her back and has Osborn cut into it. Osborn sees that the same black fluid that Caylee vomited earlier is leaking from Megan's wound. Andover begins to suspect that Blake is hiding something, as Blake is reluctant to discuss some elements of the shooting during a therapy session. This proves to be the case after Blake discovers a mask identical to the one worn by the shooter. A series of flashbacks reveals that Blake was not a victim of the shooting but the perpetrator himself and that his head wound was a botched suicide attempt. Wandering through the building, Sara discovers Andover's records where he states that the creature is actually a manifestation of fear and that his Fear Chamber was effectively starving it of what it needed to survive: more fear.

Andover is pulled into a strange cocoon-like structure on the wall, which enables the fear creature to replicate his likeness and wander the clinic. Meanwhile, Blake ended up succumbing to the influence of fear and becomes the shooter once more. He then proceeds to murder one of the clinic's employees while the fear creature incapacitates or kills several of the clinic's inhabitants through its influence. Sara encounters Blake, who chases her until she remembers a statement Andover made about Paige- that her time in the Fear Chamber incapacitated her but that she did not die until her eyes were closed. Sara realizes that although this killed Paige, it also deprived the fear creature of its food source. She manages to close Blake's eyes. She then does so to Caylee, Bauer (Corey Taylor) and Osborn, but the creature attacks her before she can get to Megan. Dylan (Brandon Beemer) kills himself, depriving the creature and loosening its hold on Sara, who is then able to close Megan's eyes. This destroys the creature and frees Andover from its influence, leaving him and Sara as the sole survivors.

Andover remarks that this is not over, and that the creature will only return and try to open the door once more. Sara replies that the only thing left is to "change the locks", and the film ends with Andover stepping into the Fear Chamber to receive treatment while Sara oversees the process, reversing their positions.

== Cast ==
- Robert Englund as Dr. Andover
- Fiona Dourif as Sara
- Thomas Dekker as Blake
- Kevin Gage as Gage
- Cleopatra Coleman as Megan
- Brandon Beemer as Dylan
- Felisha Terrell as Osborn
- Bonnie Morgan as Paige
- Corey Taylor as Bauer
- Ryder Gage as Kevin
- Angelina Armani as Caylee

== Production ==
In 2011, Hall announced that he was interested in creating a feature-length version of the webseries. The movie would expand upon the basic story of the original series and bring back Englund, Danielle Harris and Lucas Till. The original Fear Clinic had in fact been intended as a feature-length film, entitled Fear Chamber, but was turned into a shorter episodic format. Hall raised part of the funding for this film by using the fundraising site Indiegogo, and actress Fiona Dourif and Slipknot's Corey Taylor were confirmed to be performing in the film. Harris and Kane Hodder, initially intended to reprise their roles, later withdrew from the project.

Filming began in Medina, Ohio during December 2013 at a former nursing home and a local diner. Of the film's script, Hall commented that it would be darker and more surreal in tone than the web series. Shortly after Fear Clinic moved into post-production, the distribution rights were picked up by Anchor Bay Entertainment and it released in October 2014. The special effects were created by Steve Johnson.

== Reception ==
Critical reception was mixed. We Got This Covered panned the film as "underwhelming", writing "Fear Clinic is an ambitious project stitched together by unsteady hands, as the threads holding everything together threaten to unravel come the film's end." In contrast, Bloody Disgusting praised the film, which they felt "[wasn't] an amazing film, but [had] enough interesting ideas going on with some pretty great practical effects that make it a slightly above average film."
