= Kate French =

American actress and model

- Born: Flemington, New Jersey, U.S.
- Occupation: Actress
- Years active: 2006–present
- Spouse: Jon Johnson (m. 2010)
- Children: 2

Kate French is an American actress and model. She is known for her role as Niki Stevens on The L Word.

== Early life ==
Kate French was born in Flemington, New Jersey and raised in Quogue on Long Island where she grew up surfing and sailing. Her parents, Joan (née Gocha) and Rob French were both fashion models with Ford Models in the 1980s.

== Career ==
Following in her parents' footsteps, French pursued a career in modeling up until her senior year of high school but always had a passion for acting. She first appeared on the big screen in 2006 with a small cameo role in the film Accepted. French's first appearance on the small screen was in 2006, when French starred alongside Tatum O'Neal in the prime-time telenova soap opera Wicked Wicked Games. In 2007 she landed her breakout role when she joined the cast of The L Word playing closeted lesbian actress, and girlfriend of Jenny Schecter, Niki Stevens, appearing in seasons 5 and 6. French also had a role in the teen drama series South of Nowhere as Sasha Miller, a love interest of Aiden Dennison. French then appeared in two episodes of the teen drama Gossip Girl as Elle, a mysterious nanny. In 2010 French had a recurring role as Renee on One Tree Hill and later had a recurring guest role as Riley Westlake in the Hawaii-set teen drama Beyond The Break. In 2009 French played a supporting role in the independent horror film Sutures and then had a leading role in the independent romantic comedy Language of a Broken Heart, which was selected for the Hollywood Film Festival in 2011. French featured in the rock musical film Girltrash: All Night Long, which was released in 2014.

In 2011, French starred alongside Jason Ritter in the short film, Atlantis, a romance film centered around two strangers who fall in love in the lead up to the final launch of the NASA Space Shuttle Atlantis. and had a leading role in the independent thriller The Red House. French also had a guest role on the television series Up All Night. In 2012, it was announced that French had a supporting role in the independent thriller Channeling. French had a minor role in the indie feminist film Farah Goes Bang directed by Meera Menon. French was attached to the psychological thriller Liquorice. She starred in 2014 in the drama horror film Echoes and was awarded Best Actress at FilmQuest Cthulhu for this role.

== Other work ==
In 2010, French appeared in television advertisements for Bud Light and 7 Up. In 2011, she appeared in advertisements for sunglasses brand Raen Optics. In 2012, French featured in a television commercial for car company GMC. Since 2018 she has appeared in Fansville, an episodic advertising campaign for Dr Pepper.

== Personal life ==
In her spare time, she enjoys surfing, sailing and hiking. On September 25, 2010, she married photographer Jon Johnson at her parents' estate in Quogue. She is sometimes featured in his work. They live in Los Angeles and have two children. French launched a surf culture-inspired jewelry line, Low Tide LA, in 2025.

== Filmography ==
Film
Year	Title	Role	Notes
2006	Accepted	Glen's Party Girl #2	Cameo
2009	Fired Up!	Cute Captain	Cameo
2009	Sutures	Shannon	Supporting role
2010	K Citizen	Mindy	Short film Lead role
2011	Language of a Broken Heart	Emma	Lead role Nominated – California Independent Film Festival Award for Best Actress
2011	Atlantis	Allison Talbot	Short film Lead role
2013	Channeling	Tara	Supporting role
2013	Farah Goes Bang	Katie	Supporting role
2014	Girltrash: All Night Long	Sid	
2014	The Red House	Shelby Gordon	Lead role
2014	Echoes	Anna Parker	Lead role Won - Best Actress at the Filmquest Film Festival 2014
2014	Horrible Parents	Kate	Short film Cameo
2016	Last Man Club	Romy	Lead role Won - Best Actress at the Worldfest Film Festival 2016; Won - Best Actress at the Burbank International Film Festival
2016	Blood Is Blood	Sara	Lead role
2023	Oppenheimer	Presidential Aide	
2025	Vespertine	Cassy	Short film
2026	Come With Me	Rebecca	Post-production

Television
Year	Title	Role	Notes
2006–2007	Wicked Wicked Games	Brooke Crawford	Telenovela; Supporting role; 50 episodes
2007–2008	South of Nowhere	Sasha Miller	"Spencer's New Girlfriend" (season 3: episode 4) "The Truth Hurts" (season 3: episode 5) "Fighting Crime" (season 3: episode 6) "Career Day" (season 3: episode 9) "Love and Kisses" (season 3: episode 12)
2008–2009	The L Word	Niki Stevens / Jesse	Recurring role; 15 episodes
2009–2012	Gossip Girl	Elle	"Carnal Knowledge" (season 2: episode 17) "The Age of Dissonance" (season 2: episode 18) "The Return of the Ring" (season 5: episode 24)
2009	CSI: Miami	Rita	"Chip/Tuck" (season 7: episode 21)
2009	Beyond the Break	Riley Westlake	"All Riled Up" (season 3: episode 11) "Would I Lie to You?" (season 3: episode 12) "Wronged" (season 3: episode 13) "Worked" (season 3: episode 14)
2009	One Tree Hill	Renee	Recurring role; 7 episodes
2011	Up All Night	Jessie	"Hiring and Firing" (season 1: episode 9)
2012	Cubicle Cowboy	Vicki Overton	Pilot; Producer
2013	Major Crimes	Jennifer O'Brien	"Final Cut" (season 2: episode 1)
2013	The Education of Eddie & Mortimer	Lacey	Pilot; Producer
2020	Emergency Call	Self	"Crime Spree" (season 1: episode 4)
