= Echoes (film) =

- Film poster
- Directed by: Nils Timm
- Written by: Nils Timm
- Produced by: Aaron Harvey; Ditte Halleskov; Eric Binns; Nils Timm
- Starring: Steven Brand; Kate French; Kevin Brewerton; Billy Wirth; Steve Hanks
- Cinematography: Robert Toth
- Edited by: Anthony Rosc
- Music by: Dre Nitze
- Release date: July 5, 2014 (FilmQuest)
- Running time: 93 minutes
- Country: United States
- Language: English

Echoes is a 2014 American supernatural horror film directed by Nils Timm and starring Steven Brand, Kate French, and Kevin Brewerton. The story revolves around a young writer struggling with horrifying, sleep-paralysis induced visions, who retreats with her boyfriend to an isolated desert house. As the visions intensify, she finds herself on the verge of losing her mind ... or uncovering a life-threatening secret.

== Plot ==
Anna (Kate French) has a burgeoning career as a writer. With her blog and screenwriting, she’s well on her way to achieving her dreams. Sadly, her sleep paralysis is so severe it’s beginning to hinder her work. She’s constantly popping pills in order to keep it at bay but nothing is really working. Her agent boyfriend Paul (Steven Brand) wants to do what he can to help her and takes her away to his secluded glass house in the desert. He returns to the city for work while Anna stays, hoping to relax and get some work done herself. Instead, the paralysis intensifies and the visions she has become terrifying. Things begin happening she can’t explain and someone or something is trying to send her a message. After viewing footage caught on the surveillance camera, she witnesses herself murdering a man and she has no recollection of it. She desperately needs to figure out what is actually happening and what horrible secret this secluded glass house actually holds.

== Cast ==
- Steven Brand as Paul Wagner
- Kevin Brewerton as Cop
- Kate French as Anna Parker
- Ivory Dortch as Emily
- Steve Hanks as Jeremy
- J.J. Nolan as The Bartender
- Caroline Whitney Smith as Vera Palm / Ghost
- Billy Wirth as Joe
- Nicholas Charles as The Bartender / Runner
- Tina Huang as Sleep Paralysis Victim
