= Don't Look at the Demon =

- Directed by: Brando Lee
- Screenplay by: Alfie Palermo
- Story by: Brando Lee
- Produced by: Brando Lee; Danny Saphire
- Starring: Fiona Dourif
- Release dates: October 7, 2022 (United States and Canada)
- Running time: 95 minutes
- Country: Malaysia
- Language: English

Don't Look at the Demon is a 2022 Malaysian horror mystery thriller film directed by Brando Lee and starring Fiona Dourif.

== Plot ==
A team of paranormal investigators head for the highlands of Fraser's Hill, Malaysia, to probe a series of alleged disturbances at a house with a dark past.

== Cast ==
- Fiona Dourif as Jules
- Harris Dickinson as Ben
- Jordan Belfi as Matty
- Malin Crépin as Martha
- Randy Wayne as Wolf
- Hafidzuddin Fazil as Bartender

== Release ==
The film was released in theaters in the United States and Canada on October 7, 2022.

== Reception ==
The film has a 70% rating on Rotten Tomatoes based on 10 reviews. Matthew Monagle of The Austin Chronicle awarded the film two and a half stars out of five.

Brandon Zachary of Comic Book Resources gave the film a negative review and wrote, "Despite boasting some unique flavor that should have been further highlighted, Don't Look At The Demon is an underwhelming and basic horror film."
