= Fiona Dourif =

American actress and producer (born 1981)

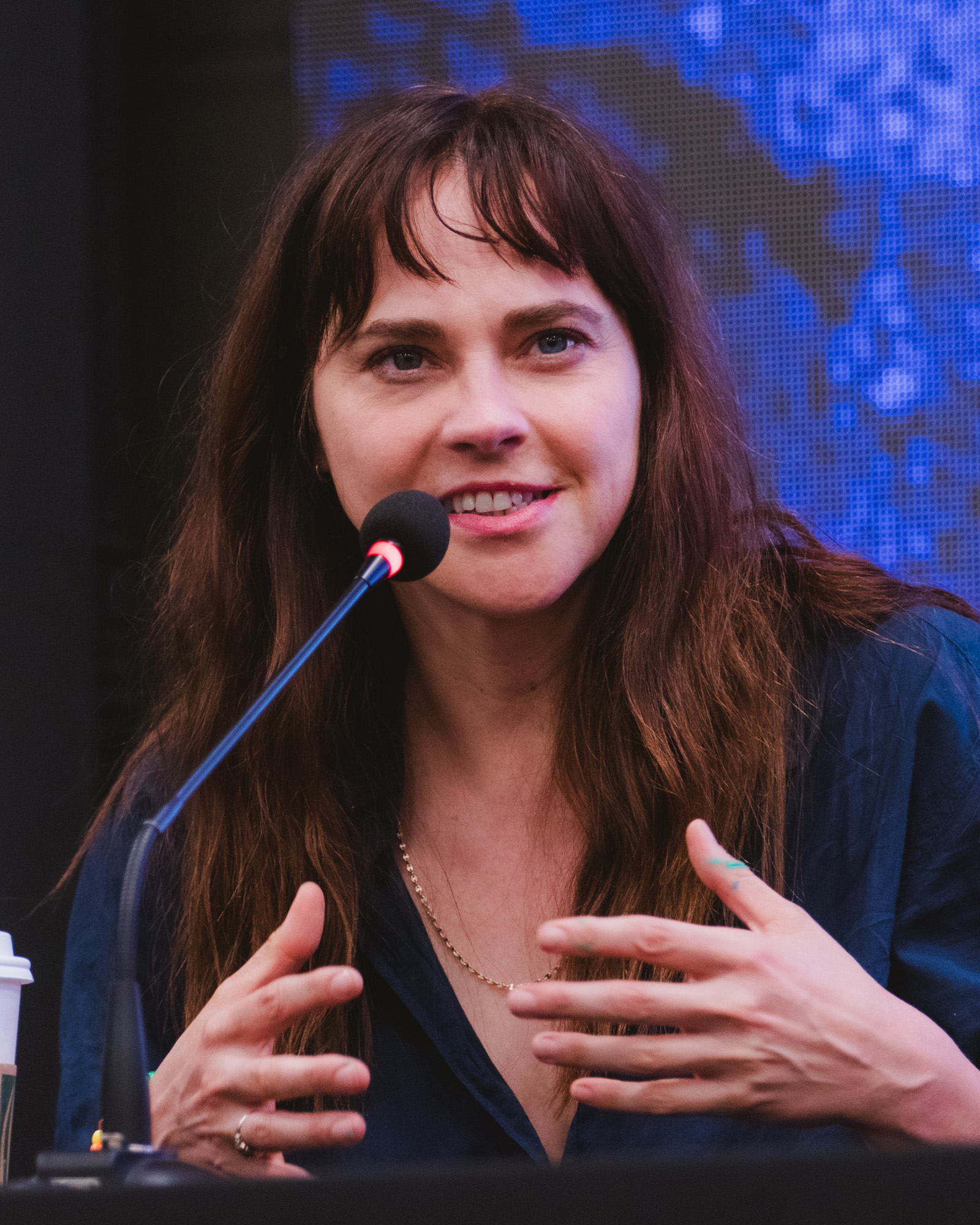
- Dourif in 2025
- Born: Fiona Christianne Dourif; October 30, 1981 (age 45); Woodstock, New York, U.S.
- Occupations: Actress; producer
- Years active: 2005–present
- Father: Brad Dourif

Fiona Christianne Dourif (born October 30, 1981) is an American actress and producer. She is best known for portraying Dr. Cassie McKay in the HBO Max medical drama series The Pitt (2025–present). For that role, she was nominated for the Primetime Emmy Award for Outstanding Supporting Actress in a Drama Series and won, alongside the cast, an Actor's Award for Outstanding Performance by an Ensemble in a Drama Series.

As an actress, Dourif has worked with directors including Christopher Nolan (Tenet), Paul Thomas Anderson (The Master), and Gus Van Sant (When We Rise).

Dourif starred as Nica Pierce in the Child's Play franchise (2013–2024), Bart Curlish in the BBC America science fiction series Dirk Gently's Holistic Detective Agency (2016–2017), and as Diane Jones in the ABC miniseries When We Rise (2017). She played recurring roles in the HBO fantasy drama series True Blood (2011), the NBC crime thriller series The Blacklist (2018–2021), the USA Network action horror series The Purge (2018), and the CBS All Access miniseries The Stand (2020).

Dourif has appeared in films such as Garden Party (2008), Fear Clinic (2014), Blood Is Blood (2016), The Shuroo Process (2021), Don't Look at the Demon (2022), and Unsinkable (2024).

== Early life ==
Dourif was born in Woodstock, New York, the daughter of actor Brad Dourif and Jonina (Joni) Dourif. Her mother worked as a professional psychic and was a practitioner of remote viewing. Dourif said she was taught remote viewing from about age 12 to 18, and was raised among practitioners who were preparing for the end of the world, the date of which kept being pushed back. Dourif has a single tattoo, of the emblem of her mother's remote viewing business. Dourif's stepfather was Edward Dames, a former U.S. Army officer who served in the Stargate Project.

After college, Dourif became a segment producer for documentaries on History and TLC. She began acting at the age of 23, supplementing her acting career with waitressing and bartending jobs for 14 years before she was able to support herself as an actress.

Dourif has a sister, Kristina Dourif.

== Career ==
In 2005, Dourif made her professional acting debut as Chez Ami Whore in the HBO period drama series Deadwood. The following year, she was cast as Alice in the television miniseries Thief. The same year, Dourif made her debut film appearance in the drama Little Chenier.

In 2007, Dourif appeared in the off-Broadway play Some Americans Abroad at Second Stage Theater. Later, she was cast in the short film The Lucky One. In 2008, Dourif portrayed Becky in the indie drama film Garden Party and Lisa in Frank the Rat. The same year, Dourif guest starred in the NBC police procedural series Law & Order: Special Victims Unit as Detective Nikki Breslin.

In 2009, Dourif was cast in a small role in the film The Messenger and had a guest role in the HBO comedy series Bored to Death. The following year, she starred in the indie film Mafiosa and the television film After the Fall. Dourif subsequently portrayed Penny in Letters from the Big Man before having a recurring role as Casey in the HBO fantasy drama series True Blood and a guest appearance in the Lifetime police drama series The Protector.

In 2012, Dourif starred in the short film This is Caroline and appeared in Paul Thomas Anderson's psychological drama The Master.

In 2013, Dourif portrayed Nica Pierce in the slasher film Curse of Chucky, the sixth installment in the Child's Play franchise in which her father, Brad Dourif, had starred as Chucky. The film was a critical success and became a cult hit. Dourif reprised her role as Nica Pierce in the 2017 horror film Cult of Chucky and in the 2021 television series continuation Chucky. She also portrayed the on-screen version of Charles Lee Ray in flashbacks, a role her father played in the original 1988 film and returned to voice for the series.

In 2014, she was cast in the indie films Gutshot Straight, Dangerous Words from the Fearless, Precious Mettle, and Fear Clinic. She also starred as Brie in the 2016 thriller film Blood is Blood.

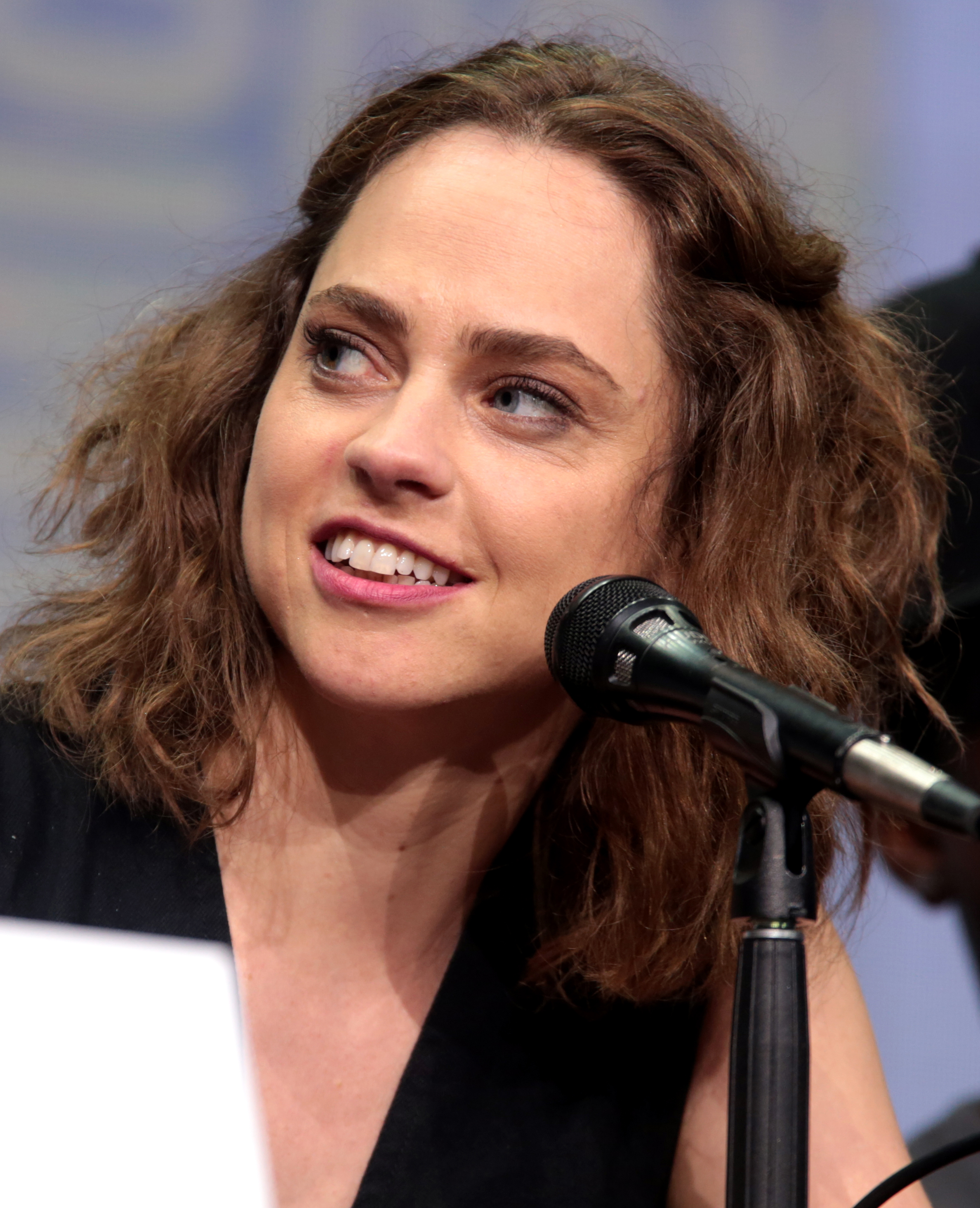
Dourif at the 2017 San Diego Comic-Con

From 2016 to 2017, Dourif played the "holistic assassin" Bart Curlish in the BBC America science fiction comedy series Dirk Gently's Holistic Detective Agency. The series ran for two seasons. Also in 2017, she portrayed the younger version of the character played by Rachel Griffiths, named Diane Jones, in the ABC docudrama miniseries When We Rise.

From 2018 to 2021, Dourif portrayed Jennifer Reddington, the long lost daughter of main character Raymond Reddington, in the NBC drama thriller series The Blacklist. She also had a recurring role in the USA Network action horror series The Purge as Good Leader Tavis, a zealous cult leader.

In 2020, Dourif was cast as the villainous Rat Woman in the miniseries adaptation of Stephen King's novel The Stand.

In 2025, Dourif was cast as a series regular in the medical drama series The Pitt as Dr. Cassie McKay.

In April 2026, it was announced that Dourif would join the cast of the Franz and Fiala film Head Full of Ghosts.

== Filmography ==
=== Film ===
Year	Title	Role	Notes
2006	Little Chenier	Jo Jo	
2007	The Lucky One	Susan	Short film
2008	Garden Party	Becky	
2008	Frank the Rat	Lisa	
2009	The Messenger	Returning Soldier's Wife	
2011	Letters from the Big Man	Penny	
2012	This is Caroline	Fiona (voice)	Short film
2012	Cold Living	Moira	Short film
2012	The Master	Dancer	
2013	Curse of Chucky	Nica Pierce	
2014	Gutshot Straight	Gina	
2014	Dangerous Words from the Fearless	Ruth	
2014	Precious Mettle	Judy	
2015	Fear Clinic	Sara	
2016	Her Last Will	Iona Cotton	
2016	Blood Is Blood	Brie	
2016	Mafiosa	Sam	
2016	Arbor Demon	Dana	
2017	Safe	Brenda	
2017	Cult of Chucky	Nica Pierce / Chucky	
2020	Tenet	Wheeler	
2021	The Shuroo Process	Parker Schafer	
2022	Don't Look at the Demon	Jules	
2023	On Fire	Sarah Laughlin	
2024	Unsinkable	Alaine Ricard	
2024	Psychonaut	Samantha	
TBA	A Head Full of Ghosts †	TBA	Filming

=== Television ===
Year	Title	Role	Notes
2005	Deadwood	Chez Ami Whore	Recurring role; 3 episodes (season 2)
2006	Thief	Alice	Miniseries; 4 episodes
2008	Law & Order: Special Victims Unit	Detective Nikki Breslin	Episode: "Swing"
2009	Bored to Death	Lisa Klein	Episode: "Stockholm Syndrome"
2010	After the Fall	Annie Tolgen	Television film
2011	True Blood	Casey	Recurring role; 8 episodes (season 4)
2011	The Protector	Tamara O'Neil	Episode: "Safe"
2015	Rizzoli & Isles	Helen Barnes' Daughter	Episode: "Face Value"
2015	The Player	Chloe Steele	Episode: "L.A. Takedown"
2015	Manhattan	Jean Tatlock	Episodes: "The Threshold" (voice only) and "Overlord"
2016–2017	Dirk Gently's Holistic Detective Agency	Bartine "Bart" Curlish	Main role; 13 episodes
2016	Still Single	Clementine Callaghan	Television film
2017	When We Rise	Young Diane Jones	Miniseries; 4 episodes
2018	Shameless	Tabitha Youens	Episode: "Church of Gay Jesus"
2018–2019, 2021	The Blacklist	Jennifer Reddington	Recurring role; 10 episodes (seasons 5-6, 8)
2018	The Purge	Good Leader Tavis	Recurring role; 5 episodes (season 1)
2020	Utopia	Cara Frostfield	Recurring role; 3 episodes
2020	Helstrom	Mother / Kthara	Episode: "Committed"
2020	The Stand	The Rat Woman	Miniseries; 4 episodes
2021	Red Bird Lane	Mikki	Television film
2021–2024	Chucky	Nica Pierce / Chucky / Charles Lee Ray	Recurring role; 12 episodes
2025–present	The Pitt	Dr. Cassie McKay	Main role; 30 episodes

== Awards and honors ==
Year	Award	Category	Work	Result	Ref.
2026	Actor Awards	Outstanding Performance by an Ensemble in a Drama Series	The Pitt	Won	
2026	Primetime Emmy Awards	Outstanding Supporting Actress in a Drama Series	The Pitt	Nominated	
