= The Stafford Project =

Web series

- Genre: Comedy
- Created by: Michelle Stafford; Paige Dorian; Paige Long
- Written by: Michelle Stafford; Paige Dorian; Paige Long
- Directed by: Paige Dorian; Paige Long
- Starring: Michelle Stafford
- Theme music composer: Roy Shakked; Holly Palmer
- Country of origin: United States
- No. of seasons: 1
- No. of episodes: 10

Production
- Executive producers: Michelle Stafford; Paige Dorian; Paige Long
- Producer: Sevier Crespo
- Production location: Los Angeles, California
- Cinematography: Franklin Guerrero, Jr.
- Editors: Franklin Guerrero, Jr.

Original release
- Release: August 5 – December 21, 2013

The Stafford Project is a web series that stars American soap opera actress Michelle Stafford, known for her award-winning portrayal of Phyllis Summers on The Young and the Restless. It debuted on August 5, 2013, via YouTube and Stafford's website.

== Development and conception ==
"It's basically a comedy about a soap opera star named Michelle who got her own sperm and created her own baby, and is trying to get her groove on. Her romantic life just falls apart in her face on every episode. It's a cross between Curb Your Enthusiasm and Sex and the City."

— Stafford on her character in The Stafford Project (2013)

The decision to debut a comedy web series coincided with Stafford's departure as Phyllis Summers on The Young and the Restless, a role that became "crazy-popular" over the course of her fifteen years with the soap opera, as well as earning her two Daytime Emmy Awards out of ten nominations. Of her decision to leave the soap, she told Soap Opera Digest: "There were a lot of personal reasons that I just think are not important to share with the world. Only my good friends should know." In an interview with TV Guide's Michael Logan, she said that wanting to pursue comedy was a primary reason behind her decision to exit the show.

The web series' launch also coincided with the launch of Stafford's personal website, which she dubbed "Doing It as a Single Chick", a website about lifestyle topics such as fitness, parenting, style and romance. The Stafford Project sheds light on Stafford's life, as she plays herself in a tongue-in-cheek reality depiction of her own life.

PRWeb's Marlan Willardson noted that it "will focus on highlighting the humor in humiliating situations. Michelle’s own life serves as inspiration – which is anything but dull – whether she’s dating, parenting or looking for her next gig as an actress in Hollywood". For the web series, Stafford enlisted the help of her close friends, Paige Dorian and Paige Long.

The web series pokes fun at the "degrading" events of Stafford's life: "I just lead that kind of life. Things go wrong. Things blow up in my face. But even the most difficult things in my life are riddled with comedy". Despite the hard events of her life, such as her struggle with having a child, she said that "I am able to look back at everything and find the humor in it all. And I do know how to tell a good story! So I thought, why not turn all this into a web show? Self-deprecation is my friend". Prior to its debut, Stafford released a promotional video teaser on July 31, 2013.

== Premise ==
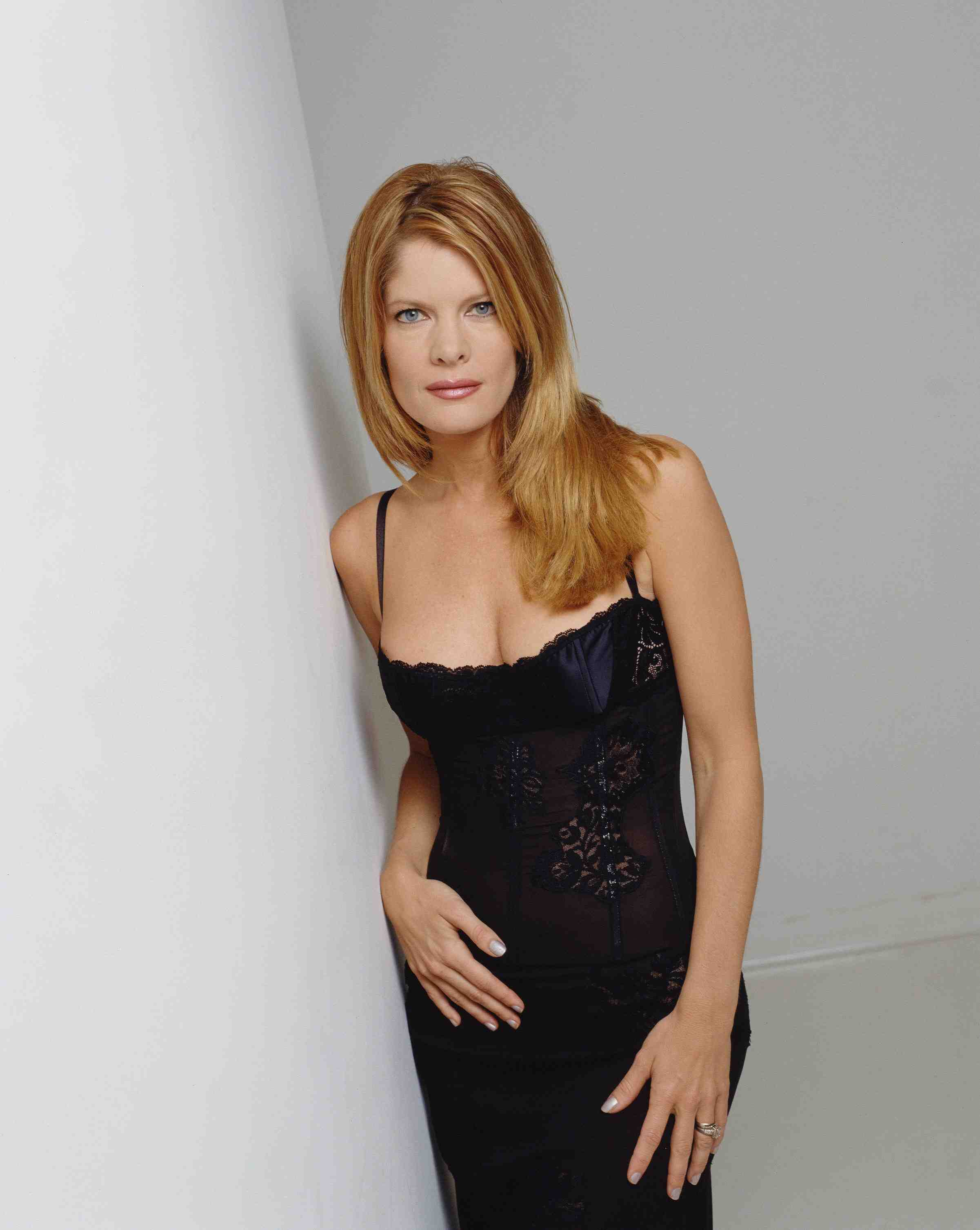
Stafford in 2007.

The series focuses on topics such as reality television, Hollywood, and Stafford's unsuccessful love life. Based on her own life, Stafford plays Michelle, an actress known for her role of Francis on a soap opera who is raising her three-year-old daughter and trying to "get her groove on as a single chick and mother". The first episode of The Stafford Project has Michelle being persuaded by her Hollywood agents to drop her soap opera role and create a web series. She refuses, but they won't take no for an answer as the camera is already rolling.

== Cast ==
- Michelle Stafford as herself
- Michael Walker as Steve
- Mike Randleman as Richard
- Natalia Stafford as herself
- Sevier Crespo as Marcus
- Rob Filios as Jonathan

== Episodes ==
Episode	Title	Release date	Duration
01	"Technicalities"	August 5, 2013	8:30
02	"You Got Your Amp"	August 18, 2013	9:31
03	"That Guy"	August 31, 2013	6:43
04	"White Secret"	September 16, 2013	10:47
05	"It's Just a Heart"	September 30, 2013	12:03
06	"The French Assassin"	October 14, 2013	8:36
07	"Reality Adjustment"	October 28, 2013	13:08
08	"The Foot Guy"	November 11, 2013	9:09
09	"Check Please"	November 25, 2013	11:05
10	"The Nut Cracker"	December 21, 2013	18:19

== Critical reception ==
Michael Logan of TV Guide appreciated the web series, calling it "terrific and audacious" and saying that "there's never a dull moment in the life of Michelle Stafford". Jamey Giddens of the entertainment website Zap2it said that Stafford is "as viable and fiery as ever", calling The Stafford Project "insanely-funny". Giddens also stated that he was "screaming with laughter the entire time", and "her adorable, talented, dream-drop of a daughter, Natalia Scout Lee, also appears, threatening to steal the show from her mommy". Michael Fairman of On-Air On-Soaps stated that there "was a realism to the ridiculousness", and thought it was "well done".
