= Michelle Stafford =

American actress (born 1965)

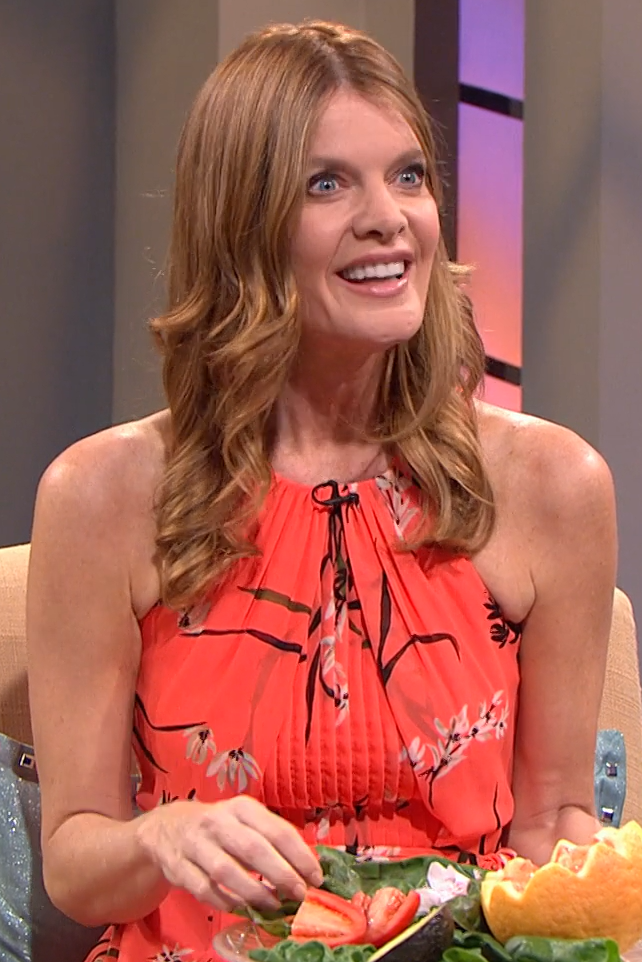
- Stafford in 2022
- Born: September 14, 1965 (age 61); Chicago, Illinois, U.S.
- Occupations: Actress; screenwriter; producer
- Years active: 1990–present
- Children: 2
- Website: www.michellestafford.com

Michelle Stafford (born September 14, 1965) is an American actress, screenwriter and producer. She currently plays Phyllis Summers on the CBS daytime soap opera The Young and the Restless, for which she has won three Daytime Emmy Awards. In 2013, Stafford created and starred in her own comedy web series, The Stafford Project. She also played Nina Reeves on the ABC daytime soap opera General Hospital from 2014-2019.

== Early life ==
Stafford was born in Chicago, Illinois. Her parents moved her and her older sister, Janine, to Montrose, California, where she was raised. After graduating from high school, Stafford chased after her dream of modeling.

== Career ==
In 1990 Stafford was cast in Fox soap opera Tribes. The show was canceled after 3-month airing on Fox. She later appeared in two plays directed by Charles Durning in Los Angeles stage, and co-starred in several small films.

In October 1994, Stafford began what was supposed to be a short term role of Phyllis Summers on the American CBS Daytime soap opera The Young and the Restless; however, her work impressed the producers and she was placed on contract. In 1997, Stafford left the series to pursue other career opportunities, and she was replaced by Sandra Nelson. In 1997 she was cast in Aaron Spelling primetime soap opera Pacific Palisades as lead character, but show was canceled after 13 episodes. She later guest-starred in Two Guys and a Girl, Diagnosis: Murder, and JAG. In film, Stafford appeared in 1999 thriller Double Jeopardy opposite Ashley Judd.

In July 2000, Stafford was brought back to the soap opera by former head writer Kay Alden. From December 2006 to February 2007, Stafford played dual roles on Y&R, portraying Sheila Carter, formerly played by Kimberlin Brown (Sheila had plastic surgery to look like Phyllis). In May 2013, it was announced that Stafford would be exiting the soap opera after sixteen years in the role. Stafford later confirmed that her final scenes would air sometime that August. Stafford exited the series on August 2, 2013.

In 2004, Stafford was a hockey correspondent for The Best Damn Sports Show Period. Stafford starred in Lifetime movie Like Mother, Like Daughter in 2007. In 2007, Stafford appeared on Tyra Banks' talk show to help Tyra through "soap opera school." In 2012 she appeared as Lauren on the web series The Grove, created by Crystal Chappell. She also guest-starred in Frasier, Charmed, and Ringer. She subsequently launched her web series, The Stafford Project, based on her personal life and struggles, with the first episode premiering on her YouTube Channel on August 5, 2013. The series received positive reviews from critics. Michael Logan of TV Guide appreciated the web series, calling it "terrific and audacious" and saying that "there's never a dull moment in the life of Michelle Stafford". Jamey Giddens of the entertainment website Zap2it said that Stafford is "as viable and fiery as ever", calling The Stafford Project "insanely-funny".

In 2014, Stafford returned to daytime television with the role of Nina Clay, the wife of Dr. Silas Clay (Michael Easton) on the ABC soap opera, General Hospital. Stafford's long-rumored addition to the cast was made official when her character Nina, the presumed-dead wife of Silas, suddenly appeared at the very end of the episode on May 1, 2014. In 2015, she co-starred alongside Tom Sizemore in the independent film Durant's Never Closes.

In 2016, Stafford launched a skincare product line called Skin Nation. The products are said to be organic, natural, gluten free, and certified cruelty-free by People for the Ethical Treatment of Animals (PETA). In 2019, it was announced that she would leave General Hospital as Nina Reeves and reprise her role of Phyllis Summers on The Young & the Restless.

== Personal life ==
Stafford's first child, a daughter, was born via a gestational surrogate in December 2009. In October 2015, Stafford had a second child, a son, by the same process.

She is a member of the Church of Scientology.

== Filmography ==
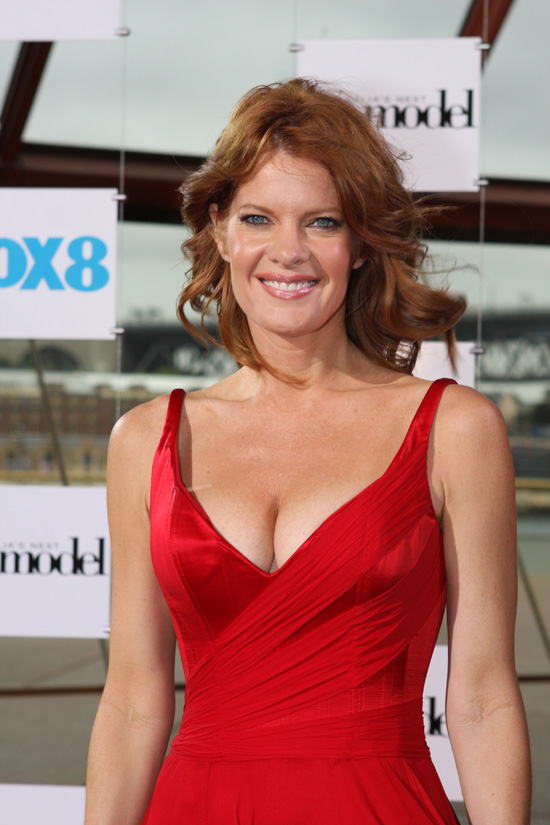
Stafford in 2011

=== Film ===
Year	Title	Role	Notes
1993	Body of Influence	Madam	
1999	Double Jeopardy	Suzanne Monroe	
2000	Attraction	Suzanne	
2002	Lost	Rachel	Short film
2002	Cottonmouth	Renee Alexander	
2003	Vampires Anonymous	Taffeta Munro	
2007	Totally Baked: A Pot-U-Mentary	Jessica	
2008	3 Days Gone	Detective Holloway	
2008	Cara	Agent	Short film
2013	Parker	Phyllis Summers	
2014	On Georgia's Mind	Tricia	Short film
2015	Earth Fall	Nancy	
2016	Durant's Never Closes	Suzie Durant	

=== Television ===
Year	Title	Role	Notes
1990	Tribes	Frankie	Series regular, 13 episodes
1994	Another Midnight Run	Hotel Guest	TV movie
1994	Renegade	Lauren Jessup	Episode: "The Posse"
1994	Models Inc.	Girl in the toilets	Episode: "Blind by Love"
1994–1997, 2000–2013, 2019–present	The Young and the Restless	Phyllis Summers	Series regular
1997	Pacific Palisades	Joanna Hadley	Series regular, 13 episodes
1998	Players	Vanessa Evans	Episode: "Wrath of Con"
1998	Two Guys and a Girl	April	Episode: "Two Guys, a Girl and a Softball Team"
1999	Diagnosis: Murder	Trish	Episodes: "Gangland: Part One" and "Gangland: Part Two"
1999	JAG	Suzanne Moore	Episode: "Contemptuous Words"
2000	V.I.P.	Nancy Biggs	Episode: "Val Point Blank"
2001	Frasier	Heather Murphy	Episode: "The First Temptation of Daphne"
2002	Judging Amy	Linda Barnes	Episode: "The Bottle Show"
2005	Clubhouse	Sydney	Episode: "Between First and Home"
2005	Charmed	Mandi	Episode: "Desperate Housewitches"
2007	Like Mother, Like Daughter	Dawna Williams	TV movie
2011	Ringer	Peggy Lewis	Episode: "If You Ever Want a French Lesson..."
2013	The Stafford Project	Herself	Web series, also writer and executive producer
2014–2019	General Hospital	Nina Reeves	Series regular
2015	Secret Mind of a Single Mom	Michelle	Web series

== Awards and nominations ==
List of acting awards and nominations for Michelle Stafford
Year	Award	Category	Title	Result	Ref.
1996	Daytime Emmy Award	Outstanding Supporting Actress in a Drama Series	The Young and the Restless	Nominated	
1996	Soap Opera Digest Award	Outstanding Female Newcomer	The Young and the Restless	Won	
1997	Daytime Emmy Award	Outstanding Supporting Actress in a Drama Series	The Young and the Restless	Won	
1997	Soap Opera Digest Award	Outstanding Villainess	The Young and the Restless	Won	
2001	Soap Opera Digest Award	Outstanding Female Scene Stealer	The Young and the Restless	Nominated	
2003	Daytime Emmy Award	Outstanding Lead Actress in a Drama Series	The Young and the Restless	Nominated	
2003	Soap Opera Digest Award	Outstanding Lead Actress	The Young and the Restless	Won	
2004	Daytime Emmy Award	Outstanding Lead Actress in a Drama Series	The Young and the Restless	Won	
2005	Daytime Emmy Award	Most Irresistible Combination (shared with Peter Bergman)	The Young and the Restless	Nominated	
2005	Daytime Emmy Award	Outstanding Lead Actress in a Drama Series	The Young and the Restless	Nominated	
2005	Soap Opera Digest Award	Outstanding Lead Actress	The Young and the Restless	Nominated	
2007	Daytime Emmy Award	Outstanding Lead Actress in a Drama Series	The Young and the Restless	Nominated	
2008	Daytime Emmy Award	Outstanding Lead Actress in a Drama Series	The Young and the Restless	Nominated	
2010	Daytime Emmy Award	Outstanding Lead Actress in a Drama Series	The Young and the Restless	Nominated	
2011	Daytime Emmy Award	Outstanding Lead Actress in a Drama Series	The Young and the Restless	Nominated	
2013	Daytime Emmy Award	Outstanding Lead Actress in a Drama Series	The Young and the Restless	Nominated	
2023	Daytime Emmy Award	Outstanding Lead Actress in a Drama Series	The Young and the Restless	Nominated	
2024	Daytime Emmy Award	Outstanding Lead Actress in a Drama Series	The Young and the Restless	Won	
2025	Daytime Emmy Award	Outstanding Lead Actress in a Drama Series	The Young and the Restless	Nominated	
2026	Daytime Emmy Award	Outstanding Lead Actress in a Drama Series	The Young and the Restless	Nominated	

== See also ==
- List of longest-serving soap opera actors

First	Phyllis Summers (role); 1994–97; 2000–13; 2019–present	Succeeded by Sandra Nelson
Preceded by Sandra Nelson	Phyllis Summers (role); 1994–97; 2000–13; 2019–present	Succeeded by Gina Tognoni
Preceded by Gina Tognoni	Phyllis Summers (role); 1994–97; 2000–13; 2019–present	Incumbent
First	Nina Reeves (role); 2014–19	Succeeded by Cynthia Watros
