= Michael Rosenbaum =

American actor and podcaster (born 1972)

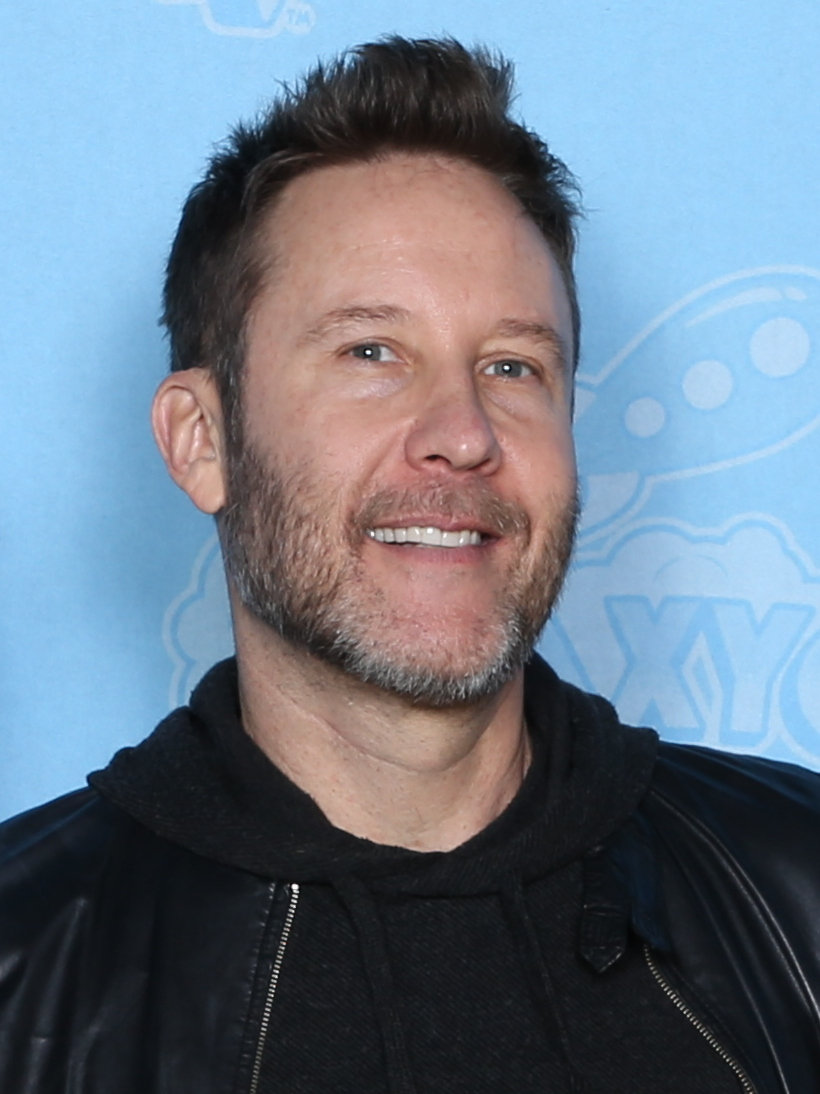
- Rosenbaum at the 2022 GalaxyCon
- Born: July 11, 1972 (age 54); Oceanside, New York, U.S.
- Education: Western Kentucky University (BA)
- Occupations: Actor; director; writer; podcaster; musician
- Years active: 1997–present

Michael Owen Rosenbaum (born July 11, 1972) is an American actor and podcaster. He is known for portraying Lex Luthor on the television series Smallville, a role that TV Guide included in their 2013 list of "The 60 Nastiest Villains of All Time".

Rosenbaum is also known for portraying Martinex in Guardians of the Galaxy Vol. 2 and Guardians of the Galaxy Vol. 3, Parker in Urban Legend, Adam/Adina in Sorority Boys and Dutch Nilbog on Fox's Breaking In. He also has an extensive voiceover career in animation, such as his role of Wally West / The Flash in the DC Animated Universe series Justice League (2001–2004) and its sequel Justice League Unlimited (2004–2006). Between 2015 and 2016, he played the lead role in the TV Land comedy series Impastor.

He is also the lead singer of the band Sun Spin with his friend Rob Danson. The band's first album, Best Days was released on February 9, 2021.

== Early life ==
Rosenbaum was born in Oceanside, New York and raised in Newburgh, Indiana. His mother, Julie (née Eckstein), is a writer and his father, Mark Rosenbaum, worked in pharmaceuticals. He is one of six children with two brothers, Eric and Adam, and a sister, Laurie. After his parents' divorce, his mother remarried sports reporter Gordon Engelhardt, and his father remarried Alexis Pelegrino, with whom he had two daughters, Rosenbaum's half-sisters. His uncle is pet behaviorist Warren Eckstein. Rosenbaum is Jewish, and says he was "closer to religion" in New York than in Indiana.

Rosenbaum graduated from Castle High School in Newburgh, Indiana and from Western Kentucky University in Bowling Green, Kentucky with a degree in theatre arts. Immediately after, he moved to New York City to pursue an acting career.

== Career ==
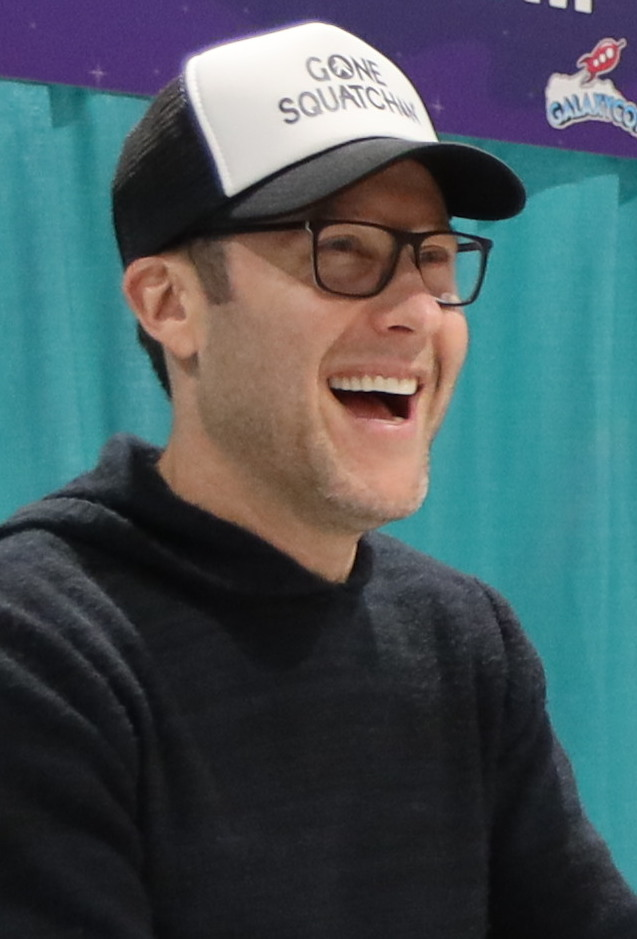
Michael Rosenbaum at GalaxyCon Richmond in 2020

In 2001, Rosenbaum received a Saturn Award for his portrayal of Lex Luthor on Smallville. Continuing in the superhero genre, he played Wally West (a.k.a. the Flash) in the DC Comics animated series Justice League, Static Shock, and Justice League Unlimited, as well as portraying a younger version of Wally West as Kid Flash in Teen Titans. In the third season Justice League Unlimited episode "The Great Brain Robbery", Rosenbaum reprised his role as Lex Luthor when Wally and Lex Luthor temporarily switched bodies. In February 2008, Rosenbaum confirmed that he would be leaving Smallville after the seventh season. After many months of speculation and him first turning down the contract to return, it was announced on February 11, 2011, that Rosenbaum would return to Smallville for the two-hour series finale, which aired on May 13, 2011, with Rosenbaum reprising his role as Lex Luthor.

In 2012, Rosenbaum appeared in Hit and Run, which starred Dax Shepard and Kristen Bell. Rosenbaum portrayed the character Gil, a jealous ex-boyfriend from Annie's (Bell's character) past.

Rosenbaum provided the voice work for Ghoul in the animated DCAU film Batman Beyond: Return of the Joker. Rosenbaum filmed the original SyFy comedy series Saved By Zeroes; yet was never picked up. He recurred in Fox's original sitcom Breaking In; the show was cancelled initially after the first season but got a second chance, and Rosenbaum was promoted to series regular. The series was cancelled again after a few episodes of the second season.

In 2014, Rosenbaum made his feature-film directorial and writing debut with the comedy Back in the Day, starring as an actor who returns to his hometown in Indiana for a class reunion. The film was filmed in Newburgh and Evansville, Indiana. Prior to the production of Back in the Day, Rosenbaum planned to direct another comedy film, titled Sorry is For Sissies. The film had a cast including Jon Heder, Colin Hanks and Jennifer Love Hewitt; however, at least half of the film's budget was lost, and the film was scrapped.

On June 17, 2014, Rosenbaum was cast as the lead in the TV Land original sitcom Impastor. The plot has been summarised as a "low-life who hides out in a small town by conning the residents into thinking he is their newly hired gay pastor".

In 2017, Rosenbaum served as narrator for the reality television show Hunted which pitted investigators against teams of ordinary citizens trying to evade capture as fugitives. Rosenbaum also starred in the Indie thriller The Neighbor opposite William Fichtner.

In 2018, Rosenbaum debuted his casual celebrity interview-based podcast called Inside of You. His first guest was his Smallville co-star Tom Welling. The two subsequently launched the podcast Talkville in July 2022, where they re-watch every episode of Smallville.

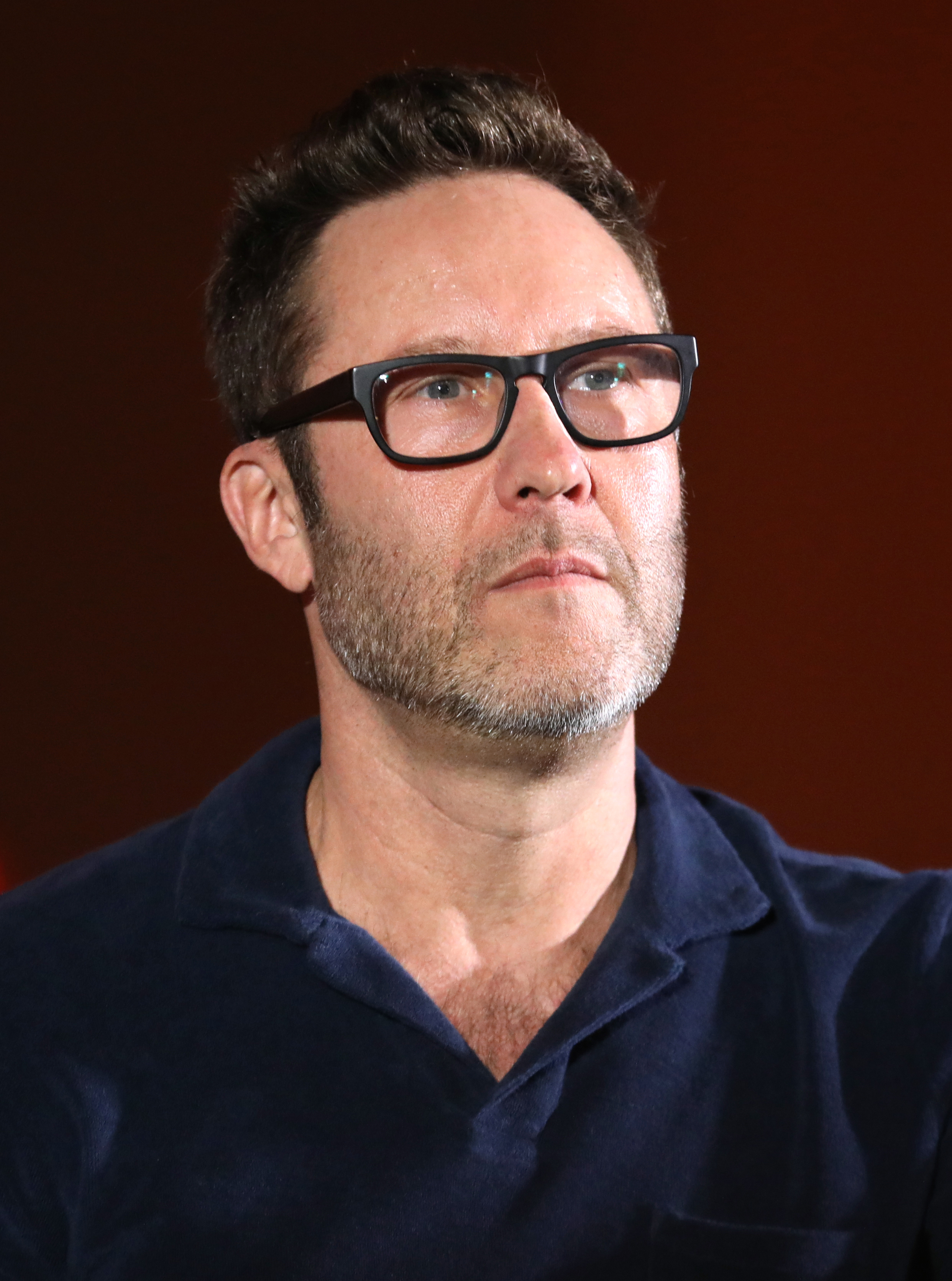
Rosenbaum in 2024

Rosenbaum reprised the role of Martinex in Guardians of the Galaxy Vol. 3, which premiered in May 2023.

In 2023, Rosenbaum's band Sun Spin released their second album, Never Is What It Is. That same year, Los Angeles Daily News reported that Rosenbaum and his longtime friend Jon Heder would star in the horror-themed reality television series Scared with Michael Rosenbaum and Jon Heder. Rosenbaum said of the project, "I wanted to do a reality show because we love horror movies. We'll go to the scariest places on Earth."

In 2024, Rosenbaum was the lead actor in the audio series TRUE NOIR: The Assassination of Anton Cermak. The series was penned by Road to Perdition's Max Allan Collins.

In 2025, Rosenbaum made a cameo in James Gunn's Superman as one of Lex Luthor's troopers, putting Eve Teschumer (Sara Sampaio) into a prison cell.

In 2026, Rosenbaum's band Sun Spin released their third album, Welcome to This life. That same year, Rosenbaum created and is executive producing an untitled project with Jeff Frost (Pluribus) and Joshua Michael Stern (Graves). Geena Davis is set to star.

== Filmography ==
=== Film ===
| Year | Title | Role | Notes | Ref. |
|---|---|---|---|---|
| 1997 | The Devil & the Angel | The Devil | | |
| 1997 | The Day I Ran into All My Ex-Boyfriends | Bart | | |
| 1997 | Midnight in the Garden of Good and Evil | George Tucker | | |
| 1998 | 1999 | Brick | | |
| 1998 | Urban Legend | Parker Riley | | |
| 2000 | Eyeball Eddie | Skelley | Short film | |
| 2000 | Batman Beyond: Return of the Joker | Ghoul | Voice; direct-to-video | |
| 2001 | Sweet November | Brandon / Brandy | | |
| 2001 | Rave Macbeth | Marcus | | |
| 2002 | Poolhall Junkies | Danny | | |
| 2002 | Sorority Boys | Adam / Adina | | |
| 2003 | Special | Fred Molinski | | |
| 2003 | Bringing Down the House | Todd Gendler | | |
| 2005 | Cursed | Kyle | Uncredited | |
| 2005 | Racing Stripes | Ruffshodd | Voice | |
| 2007 | Cutlass | Background Extra #2 | Short film | |
| 2007 | Kickin' It Old Skool | Kip | | |
| 2008 | Dragonlance: Dragons of Autumn Twilight | Tanis Half-Elven | Voice; direct-to-video | |
| 2008 | Shear Love | | Short film | |
| 2010 | Father of Invention | Eddie | | |
| 2010 | Catch .44 | Brandon | | |
| 2010 | Ghild | Brauly Gullivan | Short film | |
| 2012 | Justice League: Doom | Barry Allen / The Flash | Voice; direct-to-video | |
| 2012 | Hit and Run | Gil Rathbinn | | |
| 2014 | Back in the Day | Jim Owens | Also director, writer, and executive producer | |
| 2015 | Justice League: Throne of Atlantis | Drift Leader | Voice; direct-to-video | |
| 2016 | The Neighbor | Scott | | |
| 2017 | Guardians of the Galaxy Vol. 2 | Martinex | | |
| 2020 | DC Showcase: The Phantom Stranger | Seth | Voice; short film | |
| 2023 | Guardians of the Galaxy Vol. 3 | Martinex | | |
| 2025 | Superman | Raptor Guard #1 | | |

=== Television ===
| Year | Title | Role | Notes | Ref. |
|---|---|---|---|---|
| 1998 | The Tom Show | Jonathan Summers | Episode: "The Talk" | |
| 1999 | Rocket Power | Sports Announcer | Voice, episode: "Super McVariel 900/Loss of Squid" | |
| 1999–2000 | Zoe, Duncan, Jack and Jane | Jack Cooper | Main cast, 24 episodes | |
| 1999–2001 | Batman Beyond | Ollie, Carter Wilson / Terminal, Wendell, Carl, Agent West | Voice, 6 episodes | |
| 2000 | The Wild Thornberrys | Tom Ravenhearst | Voice, episode: "A Shaky Foundation" | |
| 2000–2004 | Static Shock | Trapper, The Flash | Voice, 5 episodes | |
| 2001–2008, 2011 | Smallville | Lex Luthor | 154 episodes Main cast (seasons 1–7), special guest (season 10); Directed the 125th episode "Freak"; Saturn Award for Best Supporting Actor on Television (2002); SFX Award for Best Newcomer (2003); Nominated – Saturn Award for Best Supporting Actor on Television (2003, 2004, 2005 & 2006); Nominated – Satellite Award for Best Performance by an Actor in a Supporting Role in a Series Drama (2003); Nominated – Teen Choice Awards for Choice TV Sidekick (2002, 2003, 2007, 2008, 2009) | |
| 2001–2002 | The Zeta Project | Agent West | Voice, recurring role | |
| 2001–2004 | Justice League | Wally West / The Flash, Deadshot | Voice, main role | |
| 2003 | Players | Himself | Episode: "Charlie's Angels" | |
| 2004–2005 | Jackie Chan Adventures | Drago | Voice; 11 episodes | |
| 2004–2006 | Justice League Unlimited | Wally West / The Flash, Deadshot, Ghoul | Voice, recurring role | |
| 2005–2006 | Teen Titans | Kid Flash | Voice, 2 episodes | |
| 2005 | It's Always Sunny in Philadelphia | Colin | Episode: "Gun Fever" | |
| 2006 | Zorro: Generation Z | Bernardo | Voice, main role | |
| 2006 | Ultraman Tiga | Evil Tiga | Voice | |
| 2008 | James Gunn's PG Porn | Charlie Brown | 2 episodes | |
| 2009 | Untitled Family Pilot | Derek | | |
| 2009 | Batman: The Brave and the Bold | Deadman | Voice, episode: "Dawn of the Dead Man!" | |
| 2011–2012 | Breaking In | Dutch Nilbog | 8 episodes | |
| 2015–2016 | Impastor | Buddy Dobbs | Main role; also executive producer | |
| 2017 | Hunted | Narrator | 7 episodes | |
| 2017 | Typical Rick | Mark | Episode: "Mr. Gaber" | |
| 2019 | Robot Chicken | Westley | Voice, episode: "Musya Shakhtyorov in: Honeyboogers" | |

=== Video games ===
| Year | Title | Voice role | Ref. |
|---|---|---|---|
| 2003 | Gladius | Valens | |
| 2005 | Yakuza | Akira Nishikiyama | |
| 2008 | Dark Sector | Hayden Tenno | |
| 2012 | Lollipop Chainsaw | Nick Carlyle | |
| 2013 | Infinite Crisis | Barry Allen / The Flash | |
| 2015 | Batman: Arkham Knight | Johnny Charisma | |
| 2016 | Star Ocean: Integrity and Faithlessness | Christophe | |
| 2018 | Lego DC Super-Villains | Barry Allen / The Flash | |
| 2025 | Marvel's Deadpool VR | Richard Rider / Nova | |
