= Thomas E. Ackerman =

American cinematographer (born 1948)

- Born: Thomas Edward Ackerman; September 14, 1948 (age 77); Cedar Rapids, Iowa, U.S.
- Occupation: cinematographer
- Years active: 1972–2020

Thomas Edward Ackerman (born September 14, 1948) is an American cinematographer.

== Career in Higher Education (2008–present) ==
Between 2008 and 2009 Ackerman joined the faculty of the University of North Carolina School of the Arts School of Filmmaking. In the subsequent years, likely bolstered in some part by Ackerman’s influence, Michael Chapman, A.S.C. began teaching at the conservatory. Ackerman, drawing from his years of experience following modest beginnings, engages upper-level cinematography students through both hands on instruction and lectures. In 2015, Ackerman debuted an autobiographical course “ Pathways: A Career in Film” through lectures and screenings.

Ackerman succeeded cinematography department chair David Elkins, S.O.C. following Elkins’ retirement in 2019.

== Filmography ==
Short film

Year	Title	Director
1984	Frankenweenie	Tim Burton
2002	CinéMagique	Jerry Rees

Feature film

Year	Title	Director	Notes
1980	New Year's Evil	Emmett Alston	Credited as "Edward Thomas"
1982	Foxfire Light	Allen Baron	
1984	Roadhouse 66	John Mark Robinson	
1985	Girls Just Want to Have Fun	Alan Metter	
1986	Back to School	Alan Metter	
1988	Beetlejuice	Tim Burton	
1988	Moonwalker	Jerry Kramer; Colin Chilvers	With Robert E. Collins, Frederick Elmes, John Hora and Crescenzo G.P. Notarile
1989	National Lampoon's Christmas Vacation	Jeremiah S. Chechik	
1991	True Identity	Charles Lane	
1993	Dennis the Menace	Nick Castle	
1994	Baby's Day Out	Patrick Read Johnson	
1995	Jumanji	Joe Johnston	
1997	George of the Jungle	Sam Weisman	
1997	The Eighteenth Angel	William Bindley	
1999	My Favorite Martian	Donald Petrie	
1999	The Muse	Albert Brooks	
2000	Beautiful Joe	Stephen Metcalfe	
2000	The Adventures of Rocky and Bullwinkle	Des McAnuff	
2001	Rat Race	Jerry Zucker	
2002	Snow Dogs	Brian Levant	
2003	The Battle of Shaker Heights	Efram Potelle; Kyle Rankin	
2003	Dickie Roberts: Former Child Star	Sam Weisman	
2004	Anchorman: The Legend of Ron Burgundy	Adam McKay	
2004	Wake Up, Ron Burgundy: The Lost Movie	Adam McKay	Direct-to-video
2005	Are We There Yet?	Brian Levant	
2005	Looking for Comedy in the Muslim World	Albert Brooks	
2006	The Benchwarmers	Dennis Dugan	
2006	Scary Movie 4	David Zucker	
2007	Balls of Fury	Robert Ben Garant	
2008	Superhero Movie	Craig Mazin	
2009	Fired Up!	Will Gluck	
2009	Infestation	Kyle Rankin	
2011	Mardi Gras: Spring Break	Phil Dornfield	
2011	Alvin and the Chipmunks: Chipwrecked	Mike Mitchell	
2015	Night of the Living Deb	Kyle Rankin	
