= Iodine (disambiguation) =

Iodine is a chemical element with symbol I and atomic number 53.

Iodine may also refer to:

== Chemistry and medicine ==
- Isotopes of iodine:
  - Iodine-123
  - Iodine-125
  - Iodine-129
  - Iodine-131
- Iodine (medical use)
  - Iodized oil, or Lipiodol, known as "Iodine", a medication derived from poppyseed oil and iodine
  - Povidone-iodine, an antiseptic
  - Tincture of iodine, an antiseptic
  - Lugol's iodine, or aqueous iodine

== Arts and entertainment ==
- Iodine (film), a 2009 Canadian science-fiction film
- "Iodine", a song by Icon For Hire from the 2011 album Scripted
- "Iodine", a song by Jawbox from the 1996 album Jawbox
- "Iodine", a song by Leonard Cohen from the 1977 album Death of a Ladies' Man
- "Iodine", a song by Pinegrove from the 2022 album 11:11
- Iodine Recordings, an American record label

== See also ==
- Iodine clock reaction, or Landolt reaction, is a classical chemical clock experiment
- Iodine deficiency, a lack of iodine in the diet
- Iodine test (disambiguation)
- Iodine value, in chemistry
- Little Iodine, an American comics strip
