= Run Hide Fight: Infidels =

2026 film by Kyle Rankin

- Release poster
- Directed by: Kyle Rankin
- Written by: Kyle Rankin
- Produced by: Dallas Sonnier; Ben Shapiro
- Starring: Jonathan Majors
- Cinematography: Kristopher Kimlin
- Edited by: Matthew Lorentz
- Music by: Mondo Boys
- Production company: Bonfire Legend
- Distributed by: The Daily Wire
- Release date: September 16, 2026
- Country: United States
- Language: English
- Budget: $5 million

Run Hide Fight: Infidels is a 2026 American action thriller film written and directed by Kyle Rankin. The film is a standalone sequel to Rankin and Daily Wire's Run Hide Fight (2020).

From the time of announcement, the film was embroiled in controversy due to both the casting of its star Jonathan Majors, who was convicted of assault and harassment in 2023, as well as its positive depictions of anti-Muslim views and negative depictions of those espousing criticism of the United States government and Israel. Like its predecessor, the film received largely negative reviews from critics.

== Plot ==
A Delta Force mission led by Captain Clay Saunders to capture ISIS leader Asad al-Madhi in Somalia is a success, but his friend and colleague Reed Shaw is killed. Seven years later, Reed's son Devlin is attending Laughton University in Virginia. He navigates college life with his friends Maya and Kwan, roommate and Army veteran P.J., crush Lizzy and campus reporter Avery. Concurrently, an escalating pro-Palestine protest encampment led by leftists Farrah and Bruce takes place at the student union building. Saunders, now a published author, visits Laughton to launch his controversial new book warning of the dangers Islam poses to America.

During Saunders's event, a terrorist attack led by Ibrahim Asad Melod, the Syrian head of an ISIS cell, takes place. They carry out a mass shooting, take hostages and also jam communications and set up explosives to discourage intervention from law enforcement. Ibrahim shows no interest in solidarity with the pro-Palestine group, brutally executing Farrah and throwing Bruce, who comes out to him as a gay man, off a roof. The cell demands the release of al-Mahdi, revealed to be Ibrahim’s father, and attempts to establish a new caliphate at the university. They segregate and forcibly convert the hostages, make women wear niqabs, and have them read anti-American statements on Avery's news live stream.

Saunders is injured after being rescued by Devlin, and leaves to get help. Devlin, P.J., and security guard Terrence team up to try and free the hostages. P.J. confesses he lied about his combat experience, but the group haphazardly succeeds in taking out multiple ISIS members and evacuating numerous hostages to safety.

Avery, Lizzy, Maya, and a badly injured Kwan remain hostage on campus. Devlin and P.J. are shocked at the FBI's reluctance to send in the Hostage Rescue Team and apparent acquiescence to Ibrahim's demands when they bring his father to campus in a helicopter. Teaming up with Saunders, they steal body armor and weapons and lead an assault on Ibrahim's remaining men. P.J. is shot, but the vest saves him and he confesses his love for Avery. Saunders uses his military influence to approach the U.S. Marines guarding al-Mahdi, and executes him. Ibrahim takes Lizzy hostage in a final showdown, but she stabs him with his own dagger which allows Devlin to shoot him dead.

== Cast ==
- Jonathan Majors as Clay Saunders, an author and former Captain in the U.S. Army Delta Force
- David Lucas as Terrence Kirk, a security guard at Laughton University
- JC Kilcoyne as Devlin Shaw, a student and the son of Saunders fallen colleague Reed Shaw
- Tyler Aser as Lizzy Dupree, a student and Devlin’s love interest
- James Bingham as P.J., a student, ex-U.S. Army soldier and Devlin’s roommate
- Savanna Leigh James as Avery, a student and reporter for The Laughton Trumpet
- Stephen Hailo as Ibrahim Asad Melod, the leader of an ISIS terrorist cell
- Myles Clohessy as Reed Shaw, a U.S. Army Delta Force operator, Devlin's father and Saunders friend
- Jason Gray-Stanford as Gary, the Dean of Laughton University
- Darby Cappillino as Peyton, a student and cheerleader
- Chris K. Lee as Kwan, a Korean-American student and Devlin's friend
- Sharon Johal as Zara, a pregnant member of Laughton University's faculty
- Charlotte Delaney Riggs as Farrah Abel, leader of the pro-Palestine encampment at Laughton University
- Hussain Syed as Rami, an Egyptian-American student
- Paulina Alvarez as Maya, a student and Devlin’s friend
- Alec Rayme as Asad al-Madhi, a captured ISIS leader
- Erin Davie as Sue, the Head of Facilities at Laughton University
- Travis Mills as Cole, a Deputy in the Powell County Sheriff’s Department
- Siaka Massaquoi as Ivory, a Deputy in the Powell County Sheriff’s Department
- Chris Blanton Jr. as College Student, Caught Up In The Campus Mayhem.

== Development ==
On December 18, 2023, following his harassment and assault conviction, Marvel Studios announced that they would be parting ways with Jonathan Majors, who had been playing Kang the Conqueror in the Marvel Cinematic Universe (MCU) and was slated to appear in the films Avengers: The Kang Dynasty (later reworked into Avengers: Doomsday) and Avengers: Secret Wars. Prior to Majors' conviction and eventual firing from Marvel, Disney removed Magazine Dreams, another film starring Majors, from its original December release date by subsidiary Searchlight Pictures in October. He was also dropped from a planned film about Dennis Rodman titled 48 Hours in Las Vegas and his role in the film The Man in My Basement was recast.

In February 2026, it was reported that Majors had started shooting his first film in four years for The Daily Wire which was said to be an untitled action thriller written and directed by Kyle Rankin produced by Bonfire Legend that would be in the vein of Red Dawn and Toy Soldiers to be produced by Ben Shapiro and Dallas Sonnier. In April of that year, it was reported that the film would be titled Run Hide Fight: Infidels and would be a standalone sequel to Rankin and Daily Wire's Run Hide Fight (2020). Sonnier defended his casting of Majors, stating:

"I have in many ways become the patron saint of canceled actors and I'm happy to do that because I understand. I've been attacked. I've been, you know, [people] attempted to cancel me or whatever and the truth is that's some BS and, I don't you know, I don't play that way and so I'm going to work with the best actors available to me, whether it's Mel Gibson, going back to Gina Carano, I worked with Armie Hammer, I've worked with James Franco twice — no one's going to tell me I can't work with someone."

=== Workplace injury during filming ===
In April 2026, it was reported that Majors and co-star JC Kilcoyne fell six feet from a window when an unsecured sheet of tempered glass meant to be shattered later in the scene fell. As a result of the incident, several members of the film crew walked off the set in protest of the set's lack of commitment to workplace safety. International Alliance of Theatrical Stage Employees (IATSE) called for a strike against the production for safety violations and labor issues. IATSE also stated on social media that: "the producers are actively looking for replacement crew", and discouraged others from taking the positions.

In response to the allegations, producer Dallas Sonnier said "We are too busy being bad asses, blowing shit up, flying helicopters, and killing movie terrorists to concern ourselves with four assholes with signs on the sidewalk and their illegitimate 'strike.'" Sonnier further dismissed the film crew's concerns saying: "The entire industry is in freefall due to strikes, and now that their members are out of work, they're trying to sabotage the few people who are still producing. We don't negotiate with communists."

== Marketing and release ==
When the first teaser for Run Hide Fight: Infidels was released in June 2026, featuring B-roll footage of Islamic terrorism, Islamic extremism, and protests, many critics described the film as Islamophobic. Producer Dallas Sonnier has said the film is a direct response to criticism of Israel and support of Palestine. Sonnier further stated: "If you're afraid to put radical jihadis as your villains, then you're a wimpy movie producer. We don't have that fear."

A full trailer debuted in August of that year.

Producer Ben Shapiro dismissed the criticisms of perceived Islamophobia by stating the film was depicting ISIS and not all of Islam. Conversely, critics argued that the speech spoken by Majors' character Saunders made no distinction between "Muslim" and "Terrorist", stating that the speech painted the whole of Islam as a threat as opposed to violent extremists. Shapiro likewise dismissed "Mehdi Hasan and CAIR and MPAC and ISNA and all the other Muslim Brotherhood associated—allegedly—groups" who criticized the film.

On September 16, 2026, the film premiered on The Daily Wire.

== Reception ==
The film received negative reviews. On the review aggregator website Rotten Tomatoes, 27% of 11 critics' reviews are positive, with an average rating of 5.5/10.

In a review for Variety, Todd Gilchrist wrote, "More an epic act of trolling than a sincere creative endeavor, Run Hide Fight: Infidels aspires to 'own the libs' and antagonize Muslims, but the filmmaking is so shoddy that neither group will likely seek it out, even to assess whether they should be offended."

Writing for The Guardian, Andrew Lawrence called the film "laughably terrible far-right propaganda", writing, "The entertainment proposition with Infidels lies in how deeply it can offend the snowflakes. The 128-minute feature, which took me three tries to finish, plays like a PragerU student film."

In a review by Joseph Holmes for Religion Unplugged, he wrote: "the movie routinely shows more contempt for Western progressives than its Islamist villains. The filmmakers spend lengthy time allowing the Islamists to murder, humiliate and torture American progressives in ways that often feel gleeful. Villains mock the heroes for being weak because of their commitment to tolerance and due process."

== See also ==
- List of film and television accidents
- Islamophobia in the United States
- Holy Terror – A graphic novel by Frank Miller criticized as Islamophobic.
- Citizen Vigilante – another 2026 action thriller criticized as promoting an anti-immigrant and anti-Islam stance.
