= Deborah Geffner =

American actress

Deborah Geffner (born August 26, 1952) is an American actress, singer, and dancer.

== Early life ==
Born in Pittsburgh, Geffner moved to New York City at the age of sixteen to train at the Juilliard School. She later danced for the Stuttgart Ballet and American Chamber Ballet.

== Career ==
She is best known for her role as Victoria Porter in Bob Fosse's award-winning movie All That Jazz, which she filmed while performing in A Chorus Line on Broadway in the role of Kristine.

Geffner worked again with Fosse in his movie Star 80. She also starred in the TV movie Legs with Gwen Verdon and Sheree North. She has been on TV shows like Scandal, Mad Men, Cold Case, Grey's Anatomy, Monk, Criminal Minds, ER, Tales of the Unexpected and Passions.

Geffner can also be seen in the movies Living Out Loud with Holly Hunter, Infestation, Exterminator 2, Chasing Destiny with Christopher Lloyd, and as herself in the documentary Store. In 2009, she wrote, directed and starred in the award-winning short film Guitar Lessons.

She directed John Patrick Shanley's play, Beggars in the House of Plenty, at Theatre 68 in Hollywood as part of their "13 by Shanley" Festival in 2009. In 2011, she directed Portrait of a Madonna and performed in Auto-Da-Fé by Tennessee Williams, also at Theatre 68, as part of the "Five by Tenn" Festival. In 2012, she directed the world premiere of "Jennifer Aniston Stole My Life" in the Hollywood Fringe Festival, chosen for Best of Fringe. She also played Gwendolyn Gardner on the soap opera The Young and the Restless in November 2020.

== Personal life ==
Geffner is a first cousin of Jeff Goldblum through their mothers. She lives in Los Angeles where she continues to act and direct movies and plays.

== Filmography ==
=== Film ===
Year	Title	Role	Notes
1979	All That Jazz	Victoria	
1983	Star 80	Billie	
1984	Exterminator 2	Caroline	
1989	Bert Rigby, You're a Fool	Dancer	
1998	Living Out Loud	Woman with Makeup	
2009	Infestation	Maureen	
2010	Chain Letter	Irene Cristoff	
2014	Booze Boys & Brownies	Sharon Dubrow	
2015	Night of the Living Deb	Deb's Mom	Voice
2015	A Beautiful Now	David's mother	
2015	The Phoenix Incident	Susan Lauder	
2016	Southside with You	Toot	
2018	Under the Silver Lake	Mom	Voice
2024	MaXXXine	Elaine	

=== Television ===
Year	Title	Role	Notes
1981	Tales of the Unexpected	Miss Grecco	Episode: "A Woman's Help"
1981	One Day at a Time	Grace	Episode: "Julie Shows Up: Part 2"
1983	Legs	Terry Riga	Television film
1983	Murder 1, Dancer 0	Jackie	Television film
1983	Buffalo Bill	Lauren Stockton	Episode: "Buffalo Bill and the Movies"
1985	MacGruder and Loud	Jenny	Episode: "On the Wire"
1986	Fame	Eve	Episode: "Hold That Baby"
1989	Falcon Crest	Savannah Sharpe	2 episodes
2001	ER	Mrs. Street	Episode: "Piece of Mind"
2001	Chasing Destiny	Nurse Finnegan	Television film
2004	Medical Investigation	Lucy Martin	Episode: "Progeny"
2004, 2005	Passions	Dr. Carlyle	2 episodes
2005	Criminal Minds	Neighbor	Episode: "Natural Born Killer"
2006	Grey's Anatomy	Mrs. Burton	Episode: "Yesterday"
2006	The Nine	Neighbor	Episode: "Pilot"
2006	Monk	Nun	Episode: "Mr. Monk Meets His Dad"
2009	Cold Case	Joy Bellowes	Episode: "Libertyville"
2009	The Forgotten	Dr. Sharon Walker	Episode: "Railroad Jane"
2012	Nuclear Family	John's Lawyer	Television film
2013	Mad Men	Mrs. Beresford	Episode: "The Quality of Mercy"
2014	Scandal	Homeland Security Chief	2 episodes
2014	The Comeback Kids	Casting Director	Episode: "The Sun Will Come Out Tomorrow"
2016	CSI: Cyber	Mary Ingram	Episode: "Going Viral"
2018	How to Get Away with Murder	Jillian	Episode: "Whose Blood Is That?"
2019	MILFriend	Kathy	Episode: "Mother, Mama"
2019	For the People	Judge Drexen	Episode: "One Big Happy Family"
2019	Aesthetic Rebellion Presents	K	Episode: "Everything I Wish I Said"
2019	The Morning Show	Kassie Spitser Crisis Specialist	Episode: "In the Dark Night of the Soul It's Always 3:30 in the Morning"
2020	The Young and the Restless	Gwendolyn Gardner	2 episodes
2021	American Horror Story: Double Feature	JoAnna	Episode: "Blood Buffet"
2025	Leviathan	Nene	Voice
