= Run Hide Fight =

2020 film by Kyle Rankin

- Theatrical release poster
- Directed by: Kyle Rankin
- Written by: Kyle Rankin
- Produced by: Amanda Presmyk; Dallas Sonnier
- Starring: Isabel May; Radha Mitchell; Thomas Jane; Eli Brown; Olly Sholotan; Britton Sear; Cyrus Arnold; Catherine Davis; Treat Williams; Barbara Crampton
- Cinematography: Darin Moran
- Edited by: Matthew Lorentz
- Music by: Mondo Boys
- Production companies: Bonfire Legend; Media Finance Capital; Good Wizard
- Distributed by: The Daily Wire
- Release dates: September 10, 2020 (Venice); January 14, 2021 (United States)
- Running time: 109 minutes
- Country: United States
- Language: English
- Budget: $1.5 million

Run Hide Fight is a 2020 American action thriller film written and directed by Kyle Rankin. The film stars Isabel May, Radha Mitchell, Thomas Jane, Eli Brown, Olly Sholotan, Britton Sear, Cyrus Arnold, Catherine Davis, Treat Williams, and Barbara Crampton. It follows a teen girl who goes to save a group of hostages at her high school from a quartet of school shooters. The film's title derives from the "Run. Hide. Fight." procedure one can use during the event of an active shooter.

The film had its world premiere at the Venice Film Festival on September 10, 2020, and was released by The Daily Wire in North America on their platform on January 14, 2021. It received largely negative reviews from critics. A standalone sequel, Run Hide Fight: Infidels, was released in September 2026.

== Plot ==
High school student Zoe Hull struggles with the death of her mother, Jennifer, and her relationship with her father, Todd, is strained. On the way to school, Zoe witnesses classmate Chris Jelick planting a strange device in a field, but writes it off as a prank. At school, Zoe's best friend Lewis attempts to ask her to prom but Zoe leaves for the bathroom when a drink is spilled on her.

Around town, several incendiary devices are set off, distracting first responders. A van carrying four school shooters crashes into the school cafeteria. The leader, Tristan Voy, orders his accomplices Chris Jelick, Anna Jelick, and Kip Quade to begin killing students, but most of them are held hostage for creative purposes. Lewis, who has access to the school's Facebook page, is tasked with live streaming by Tristan. Zoe crawls through the bathroom ceiling and escapes the school. She begins warning students and helping them escape.

Tristan calls the front office to alert them of the shooting. Because school protocol requires that the shooting be confirmed, the school's principal and security guard are sent to the cafeteria to investigate. The principal attempts to talk Tristan down, blaming himself for Tristan's rage. Tristan admits that the entire shooting was a ploy for attention and he only seeks to gain infamy. Tristan kills the principal but allows the unarmed security guard to escape, commenting on how unprepared the guard was for an actual shooting. With the situation finally confirmed, the front office calls a lockdown.

Since the shooters are taking hostages instead of actively shooting, Sheriff Tarsy wants to coordinate a safer response but it proves to be difficult. An explosion in the front office kills the first police officer to respond. While Anna surveys the damage, Zoe deduces that the shooters want a lockdown as it lets them catch people more easily so she tries to warn more classes, but Anna finds her. Zoe fights Anna and kills her with her own gun in self-defense. A police officer arrives at Tristan's home to see that he has murdered his mother. The media picks up the livestream, much to Tristan's delight, and he begins removing students from their classrooms where they are sheltered in place.

Kip encounters Zoe and chases after her, but he is quickly subdued. Handcuffed, Kip admits his motivation for the shooting was retaliation for a bullying incident that occurred in middle school. Zoe points out that Kip has murdered several innocent students who had nothing to do with the incident. Zoe contacts the Sheriff and tells him that he needs to direct the media's cameras away from the school so that she can safely evacuate students. Sheriff Tarsy calls Tristan live on-air to provide cover, but Tristan soon realizes the ruse. Tristan demands Zoe reveal herself to him, threatening to kill hostages every five minutes if she does not.

Zoe returns to Kip, who expresses remorse for what he has done. As partial atonement for his crimes, Zoe has Kip ambush Tristan and Chris for her. Kip is killed, but Zoe escapes with Lewis, who gets injured. Zoe settles Lewis and reveals that she reciprocates his feelings for her, but that she has a hard time expressing them. Lewis warns her that the van in the cafeteria is filled with explosives. Chris is sent to kill Zoe, but he is instead killed by Todd, who has taken a sniping position outside the school, right before Chris can execute her. Zoe hijacks the livestream, telling Tristan that she is the one people will remember, not him.

Tristan rigs the van to explode and escapes with a single hostage and an explosive. Zoe jams the van in reverse so it explodes in the vacant parking lot. Zoe pursues Tristan but is mistakenly arrested by SWAT. Outside of the school, Zoe meets Sheriff Tarsy, who thanks her for her actions and tells her that Tristan died in an explosion. Zoe meets with her father, affirming their love and repairing their relationship. Afterward, she sees Tristan fleeing into the woods, having faked his death. Zoe retrieves her father's hunting rifle and shoots Tristan as he retrieves a cache of money and a passport. Standing over him, Zoe lets Tristan bleed to death, telling him that it is what he deserves for what he has done.

== Cast ==
- Isabel May as Zoe Hull
- Radha Mitchell as Jennifer Hull
- Thomas Jane as Todd Hull
- Eli Brown as Tristan Voy
- Olly Sholotan as Lewis Washington
- Britton Sear as Chris Jelick
- Cyrus Arnold as Kip Quade
- Catherine Davis as Anna Jelick
- Treat Williams as Sheriff Tarsy
- Barbara Crampton as Mrs. Jane Crawford
- Cindy Vela as Ms. Nunez
- Tom Williamson as Mr. Coombs
- Joel Michaely as Mr. Yates
- Kenneisha Thompson as Deputy Monique Williams
- Shelby Mayes as Cora Brenner
- Nate Boyer as Commander Riggins
- Corin Nemec as Beat Cop
- Bryan Massey as Gym Teacher

== Production ==
In December 2019, it was announced Thomas Jane, Radha Mitchell, Isabel May, Eli Brown, Olly Sholotan, Treat Williams, Barbara Crampton, Cyrus Arnold, Britton Sear, and Catherine Davis had joined the cast of the film, with Kyle Rankin directing from an original screenplay he wrote, with Rebeller distributing. The film was shot in Red Oak, Texas on a $1.5 million production budget over a five-week period.

The opening shot of the film which features the main character hunting deer with her father, featured actual footage of a deer being shot, which is discouraged by the American Humane Society. SAG-AFTRA stated that no specific violations occurred with respect to the scene, and it was understood that the hunter who took the shot would have done so regardless of whether filming was being done or not.

== Release ==
Run Hide Fight premiered at the Venice Film Festival on September 10, 2020.

The Daily Wire acquired the North American distribution rights to the film, and it was shown on their subscription platform starting on January 14, 2021.

On February 18, 2022, the film was released in theaters across Indonesia via 21 Cineplex.

== Reception ==
The film has a score of 30% on Rotten Tomatoes based on 20 reviews, with an average rating of 5.20/10. On Metacritic, the film has a score of 13 out of 100 based on reviews from 6 critics, indicating "overwhelming dislike."

The film was described as "fundamentally tasteless" by Jonathan Romney of Screen International, though he praised its "strong performances from young stars". Guy Lodge of Variety compared the film to a cross between Elephant (2003) and The Hunger Games (2012), and criticized the film for being "merely pedestrian at the levels of direction, craft and performance" and "a grab for attention by peddling an ambiguous line on gun control and eye-for-an-eye morality."

David Rooney of The Hollywood Reporter stated, "Half-hearted posturing aside, this is Die Hard in a high school, with a seventeen-year-old female John McClane getting motivational input from her dead cancer mom as she dismantles the murderous plot using little more than gut instincts." David Ehrlich of IndieWire criticized director Rankin for several of the tropes he implemented, stating that the film is "a glib, artless, and reprehensibly stupid thriller that doesn't even have enough on its mind to be provocative." Robbie Collin of The Telegraph negatively compared the ringleader of the school shooters to the Joker from The Dark Knight (2008) and noted that "May's performance feels as heroic as the character she's playing" but that the film "makes no attempt to grapple with the American school shooting as a nihilistic cultural phenomenon."

== Sequel ==
In February 2026, it was reported that Jonathan Majors had started shooting his first film in four years for The Daily Wire which was said to be an untitled action thriller written and directed by Kyle Rankin produced by Bonfire Legend that would be in the vein of Red Dawn and Toy Soldiers to be produced by Ben Shapiro and Dallas Sonnier. In April of that year, it was reported that the film would be titled Run Hide Fight: Infidels and would be a standalone sequel to Rankin and Daily Wire's Run Hide Fight.
