= Iodine (film) =

- Directed by: Michael Stasko
- Written by: Michael Stasko
- Produced by: Michael Stasko; Ted Bezaire; Jeff Penttila; Eric Schiller
- Starring: Jodi Behan; Jason Collett; Ray Wise
- Cinematography: Eric Schiller
- Edited by: Muzafar Malik; Michael Stasko
- Music by: Eric Schiller; Michael Stasko
- Production company: The Dot Film Company Inc.
- Distributed by: Whitewater Releasing
- Release date: August 27, 2009
- Running time: 97 minutes
- Country: Canada
- Language: English
- Budget: C$200,000

Iodine is a 2009 Canadian science fiction drama film written and directed by Michael Stasko.

== Plot ==
John Clem (Michael Stasko) heads north to investigate the disappearance of his estranged father. Upon arriving at the family cottage, John runs into Avery (Ray Wise), his father's colleague. John receives no help on his dad's disappearance, but instead, a new set of eyes in which to view the living world around him. Avery assures John that they had been working on a special project which involved using iodine as a water purification tool, to preserve their natural surroundings. Environmental concerns and future implications of modernized society become a share interest and source of impassioned philosophical discussion for the two and they bond. However, John being a man of immense insecurity and uncertainty is forced to endure isolating surroundings while on the search for his father. The pressure from the rest of the family causes John an emotional breakdown as he is unsure of whether he can trust Avery.

== Partial cast ==
- Michael Stasko as John
- Ray Wise as Avery
- Jodi Behan as Marissa
- Jason Collett as Deputy Peel
- Vicki Rivard as Laura

== Production ==
The crew consisted of ten film students and done on a low budget. The project was filmed in Northern Ontario's Parry Sound on super 16mm film, over the course of 15 days. Produced by The Dot Film Company Inc., it runs for 97 minutes and was recognized in the Montreal World Film Festival in 2009.

Michael Stasko (Things To Do, 2006) wrote, produced, directed and acted in this film. This was Jason Collett's acting debut serving as comic relief Deputy Peel. The film was recognized by the Montreal Gazette for its well placed score which was produced by Michael Stasko and Eric Schiller.
