= The Battle of Shaker Heights =

2003 film by Efram Potelle, Kyle Rankin

- Theatrical release poster
- Directed by: Efram Potelle; Kyle Rankin
- Written by: Erica Beeney
- Produced by: Chris Moore; Jeff Balis
- Starring: Shia LaBeouf; Elden Henson; Amy Smart; Shiri Appleby; Kathleen Quinlan; William Sadler
- Cinematography: Thomas E. Ackerman
- Edited by: Richard Nord
- Music by: Richard Marvin
- Production company: LivePlanet
- Distributed by: Miramax Films
- Release date: August 22, 2003
- Running time: 77 minutes
- Country: United States
- Languages: English; German
- Budget: $1 million
- Box office: $280,351

The Battle of Shaker Heights is a 2003 American comedy-drama teen film directed by Efram Potelle and Kyle Rankin, written by Erica Beeney, and produced by Chris Moore and Jeff Balis. It stars Shia LaBeouf, Elden Henson, Kathleen Quinlan, Amy Smart and Shiri Appleby. Released on August 22, 2003, the film received negative reviews. The film was the winning script for the second season of Project Greenlight.

== Plot ==
Kelly Ernswiler, a young war reenactment enthusiast, works at his local store with love interest Sarah and Bart Bowland. Kelly's father, Abe, works with drug addicts, being clean himself for over five years. His mother, Eve, is a commercial artist.

Kelly attempts to woo Bart's older sister, Tabby, even though she's set to marry Miner Weber, a handsome businessman. Kelly becomes a regular at Bart's house, being over for dinner often, and he impresses Bart's father, Harrison, with their common fondness for war memorabilia, and Bart's mother by complimenting her on her flowers, and he often talks to Tabby in her workshop. During this time, Sarah asks him to go to an Aerosmith concert, which she has a spare ticket for, telling him it would be good for him to get out more. When he bluntly makes it clear that he knows it would be a date, he tells her he is seeing someone else, obviously meaning Tabby. Before Kelly and Bart perform their plan for Lance's humiliation, Bart makes it clear to Kelly that he knows he has "his own agenda", at which Kelly is insulted and angry, and Bart displaces it as "pre-mission nervous energy". They recreate an invasion on the street where Lance lives and drag him out of the house pointing guns at him and shouting at him with German accents. They videotape the whole thing and he urinates out of fear.

Afterwards, the boys are drinking whiskey at Bart's house and Bart passes out in a chair by the fire. Kelly makes to go home and goes to the workshop to say goodbye to Tabby. He walks in on her crying, as she now thinks the marriage will be off and goes to comfort her, and they kiss. As Kelly is leaving, Bart sees him and is furious as he knew he was in the workshop. The next day, as Kelly is on a set for a war program that Bart got them in, Bart hasn't turned up. Kelly is cast in a role to be a jeep driver and when his cue is called, Bart turns up out of the bushes and confronts him about Tabby. Kelly denies it at first and then becomes speechless. As he is about to drive for his cue, Bart attacks him in the jeep and they make a mess of the set.

The next day, Abe is taken into care again for relapsing and Kelly is emotionless. He goes to the wedding the same day, only to have an annoyed Bart tell him that he can't let him in. He sneaks into Tabby's limo before it pulls in and he talks to her, and it is a moment in which he finally realizes he must grow up. He gets out of the car and everyone at the wedding sees him and are all confused. He goes round the back of the church to get his bike and leave and meets Miner again, who has no idea of what happened with Kelly and Tabby, and is civil towards him. Kelly cycles to the clinic where his father is staying and is surprised. They begin to watch television and his mother walks in and is surprised and happy to see Kelly.

In the end, it shows the voicemail message where Kelly apologizes to the Bowlands for his behavior and asks Bart if he will meet him where he will be selling all his old memorabilia, and gives a hat Bart acquired for him back. He is shown walking down the street with Sarah and they hold hands. Kelly sees Lance again on his lawn where they faked the invasion, and goes over to him and confesses, only to be punched in the jaw. Kelly lies on the grass, holds his bruised jaw, and says: "I deserved it".

== Cast ==
- Shia LaBeouf as Kelly Ernswiler
- Elden Henson as Bart Bowland
- Amy Smart as Tabitha "Tabby" Bowland
- Shiri Appleby as Sarah
- Kathleen Quinlan as Eve Ernswiler
- William Sadler as Abraham "Abe" Ernswiler
- Ray Wise as Harrison Bowland
- Dana Wheeler-Nicholson as Mathilda Bowland
- Billy Kay as Lance Norway
- Michael McShane as Mr. Norway
- Anson Mount as Miner Weber
- Hattie Winston as Principal Holmstead

== Production ==
The film was shot in and around the greater Los Angeles region. Sites included the Los Angeles County Arboretum and Botanic Garden, Reseda and Santa Monica. No live action footage featuring the stars was filmed in Shaker Heights, Ohio.

== Reception ==
On Rotten Tomatoes, the film has an approval rating of 39% based on reviews from 59 critics. The critics consensus states "LaBeouf is appealing, but The Battle of Shaker Heights feels too watered down and disjointed." Metacritic, which uses a weighted average, assigned the film a score of 33 out of 100, based on 22 critics, indicating "generally unfavorable" reviews.

Roger Ebert gave the film two stars out of four, one less than his review for Stolen Summer. In his review, he wrote: "You get the sense of too much input, too many bright ideas, too many scenes that don't belong in the same movie. Odd, how overcrowded it seems, for 85 minutes."
