= Chris Marquette =

American-Spanish actor (born 1984)

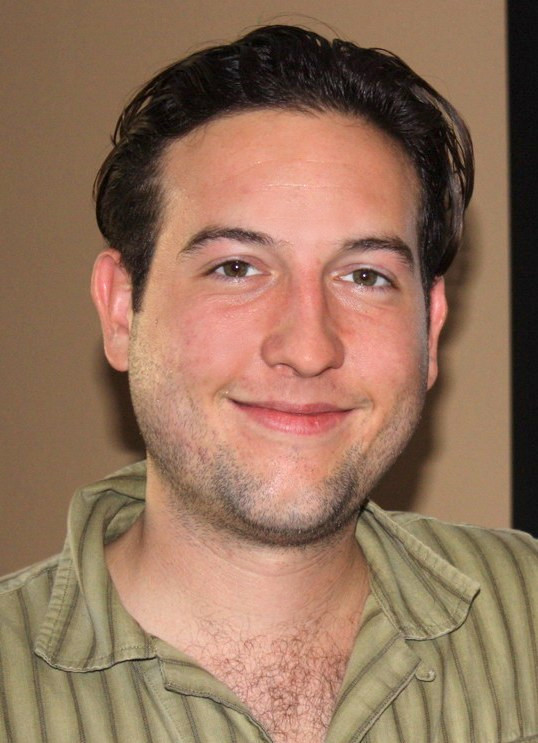
- Marquette in 2008
- Born: Christopher George Rodriguez-Marquette; October 3, 1984 (age 41); Stuart, Florida, U.S.
- Citizenship: United States; Spain
- Occupation: Actor
- Years active: 1991–present
- Spouse: Nora-Jane Noone
- Children: 1
- Relatives: Sean Marquette (brother)

Christopher Marquette (born October 3, 1984), also credited as Christopher Rodriguez-Marquette, is an American actor. He began his career with a main role as Adam Brody on the ABC sitcom Aliens in the Family (1996) before his breakout with a main role as Marc Delgado on the Lifetime medical drama series Strong Medicine (2000–2005).

Following his breakout on Strong Medicine, Marquette had a main role as Mason McAllister on the Fox soap opera Pasadena (2001) and voiced lead character Alex O'Connell on the WB animated series The Mummy (2001–2003). He gained further mainstream attention with a main role as Adam Rove on the CBS series Joan of Arcadia (2003–2005) and starring roles in the films Freddy vs. Jason (2003), The Girl Next Door (2004), Just Friends (2005), Alpha Dog (2006), and The Invisible (2007).

In the late 2000s, Marquette starred in the films Life During Wartime (2009), Race to Witch Mountain (2009), and Fanboys (2009). In the 2010s and 2020s, he starred in the films The Double (2011) and Always Watching: A Marble Hornets Story (2015) and had a main role as Octie on the Gala Film web series RZR (2024). In 2025, he was cast in the fourth season of Reacher.

== Early life ==
Marquette has two younger brothers, actors Sean Marquette and Eric. His father was a Cuban refugee and is a nuclear engineer.

== Career ==
In 1991, he played as Joseph in the Barney and the Backyard Gang video Rock With Barney. In 1995, he made a brief appearance on Saturday Night Live, season 21, episode 4. The 11-year-old Marquette played a trick-or-treater in the opening Halloween sketch. He forgot his line and whispered "damn" under his breath, before Norm Macdonald helped him out. He also provided the voice of Spencer Lionheart in the "MGM Sing-Alongs" Videos back in 1997. However, his acting debut was in 1998 with the musical drama film The Tic Code. In 2000, he appeared in the Disney Channel movie Up, Up and Away. From 2000 to 2005, he had a supporting role in Lifetime TV's Strong Medicine, playing Marc Delgado, the tween-to-teen son of the series' lead character, Luisa Delgado. In 2004, he starred in The Girl Next Door. The same year, he became a series regular on the CBS show Joan of Arcadia opposite Amber Tamblyn and Jason Ritter (whom Marquette co-starred with in the 2003 slasher film Freddy vs. Jason) before Joan of Arcadia's cancellation in early 2005.

Marquette was also given a supporting role in Just Friends with Ryan Reynolds, Amy Smart, Anna Faris and Chris Klein. In 2006's Alpha Dog, Marquette portrays Keith Stratten alongside Emile Hirsch, Justin Timberlake and Ben Foster. He played the best friend of main character Nick Powell in the thriller The Invisible, a remake of a Swedish film, which starred Justin Chatwin and Marcia Gay Harden and was released on April 27, 2007. He has also had supporting/minor roles in the films 61* with Barry Pepper and Thomas Jane, and the Disney Channel original TV movie Up, Up and Away! with Robert Townsend.

Among Marquette's movies is Fanboys, in which he plays obsessed Star Wars fan Linus Poonwah. Fanboys was shot in spring 2006 in New Mexico, and also stars Sam Huntington, Dan Fogler, Jay Baruchel and Veronica Mars' Kristen Bell. Another of his acting projects is an independent movie called The Education of Charlie Banks, which was directed by Limp Bizkit's Fred Durst. Whether on purpose or not, Chris frequently appears in movies with a group of actors including Emile Hirsch, Paul Dano, Amanda Seyfried and Nikki Reed. In Infestation, an action comedy by Kyle Rankin that was shot in summer 2007 in Bulgaria, he plays the lead role—a young man named Cooper who has to fight for survival against giant alien insects that have taken over the world. One of his latest projects was Race to Witch Mountain, a modern-day reimagining of Disney's 1975 film Escape to Witch Mountain in which Marquette played the character of Pope—a computer specialist out of MIT, helping the bad guys. Marquette starred alongside Dwayne Johnson, Tom Everett Scott and Ciarán Hinds; the film was released March 2009.

Marquette has also been seen as a guest star on several TV shows, such as ER, Touched by an Angel, 7th Heaven, Miracles, Boston Public and Judging Amy. The latest guest roles include the Showtime TV series Huff; Christopher played James, a friend of Byrd's (Anton Yelchin, whom he also played alongside in Alpha Dog), in the 2006 episodes "Sweet Release", "Bethless", and "Tapping the Squid". As Christopher Marquette, he returned on-screen, in late 2010, with fellow Joan of Arcadia actor Michael Welch as two friends who murder together in the Criminal Minds episode entitled "JJ". In 2011 he appeared as Danny, a young homeless patient who is later revealed to be a cannibalistic serial killer in the award-winning medical drama House.

== Philanthropy ==
He supports charities such as the Sunshine Kids Foundation (to grant wishes of seriously ill, handicapped and abused children), Pediatric AIDS, and the Children's AIDS Fund.

== Filmography ==
=== Film ===
Year	Title	Role
1999	The Tic Code	Miles Caraday
1999	Lansky	Jake Lansky
2003	Freddy vs. Jason	Charlie Linderman
2004	The Girl Next Door	Eli Brooks
2005	Just Friends	Mike Brander
2006	Alpha Dog	Keith Stratten
2006	American Gun	David Huttenson
2007	Remember the Daze	Felix
2007	The Education of Charlie Banks	Danny
2007	Graduation	Carl Jenkins
2007	The Invisible	Pete Egan
2009	Life During Wartime	Billy
2009	Race to Witch Mountain	Mr. Pope
2009	Infestation	Cooper Flynn
2009	Fanboys	Linus
2011	The Rite	Eddie
2011	The Double	Harrison
2013	Kilimanjaro	Mitch
2013	10 Rules for Sleeping Around	Ben Roberts
2013	The Odd Way Home	Duncan
2014	Chu and Blossom	Steve
2014	Bad Country	Fitch
2015	Always Watching: A Marble Hornets Story	Milo Burns
2015	Broken Horses	Buddy Heckum
2015	Night of the Living Deb	Chaz Waverly
2016	Misconduct	Giffords
2016	Fear, Inc.	Ben Davidson
2016	Chokeslam	Corey Swanson
2018	Nostalgia	Craig
2018	Parker's Anchor	Jared
2020	I Hate the Man in My Basement	Claude
2020	Faith Based	Hans

=== Television ===
Year	Title	Role	Notes
1991	Barney & the Backyard Gang	Joseph	Episode: "Rock with Barney"
1995	Saturday Night Live	Kid	Episode: "Gabriel Byrne / Alanis Morissette"; uncredited
1996	Aliens in the Family	Adam Brody	Main role
1996	Beverly Hills, 90210	Alex	Episode: "Fearless"
1998	The Nanny	Young Maxwell Sheffield	Episode: "The Hanukkah Story"
1999	7th Heaven	Peter Lawernce	Episode: "Who Nose?"
1999	Touched by an Angel	Tim	Episode: "Fighting the Good Fight"
1999	Rocket Power	Donnie Lightning (voice)	Episode: "The Wrath of Don"
2000	Even Stevens	Curtis Stevens	Episode: "Heck of a Hanukkah"
2000	Up, Up and Away	Randy	Television film
2000	Touched by an Angel	Cody Benson	Episode: An Angel On My Tree
2000	Geppetto	Buonragazzo, Jr.	TV film
2000	ER	Marty Dorset	Episode: "Abby Road"
2000–2001	The Kids from Room 402	Arthur Kenneth Van der Wall	Voice role; 2 episodes
2000–2005	Strong Medicine	Marc Delgado	Main role (season 1–5); guest role (season 6)
2001	Pasadena	Mason McAllister	Main role
2001	As Told By Ginger	Stuart Higsby (voice)	Episode: "Cry Wolf"
2001–2003	The Mummy	Alex O'Connell	Main voice role
2002–2004	Fillmore!	Jamie Townsend / various characters	Recurring voice role
2003	Miracles	Travis Prescott	Episode: "The Bone Scatterer"
2003	K10C: Kids' Ten Commandments	Seth	Television special
2003–2005	Joan of Arcadia	Adam Rove	Main role
2005	Huff	James Cullen	Episodes: "Sweet Release", "Bethless", "Tapping the Squid"
2010	Weeds	Ted	Episodes: "Bliss", "Boomerang"
2010	Criminal Minds	Jimmy Barrett	Episode: "JJ"
2010	Outlaw	Tim Reed	Episode: "In Re: Tony Mejia"
2011	House	Danny	Episode: "Fall from Grace"
2012	Awake	Kenneth Jones	Episode: "Awake"
2012	Hawaii Five-0	Seth Tilton	Episode: "Mohai (Offering)"
2012	The Unknown	Ian	Web series; episode: "Life Sentence"
2012	Co-Op of the Damned	Jamie	Web series; episode: "Zombie Love - Braaaaiinss"
2015	Mozart in the Jungle	Mozart	Episode: "Stern Papa"
2016	Lucifer	Carver Cruz	Episode: "Manly Whatnots"
2017–2018	All Wrong	Carlos	Main role
2018–2022	Barry	Chris Lucado	Recurring role; 5 episodes
2020	The Fugitive	Ridge	Recurring role; 3 episodes
2021	Magnum P.I.	Barry Wilson	Episode: "Better Watch Out"
2024	RZR	Octie	Main role
2026	Reacher	Jacob Merrick	Main role; 8 episodes
