= Ray Wise =

American actor (born 1947)

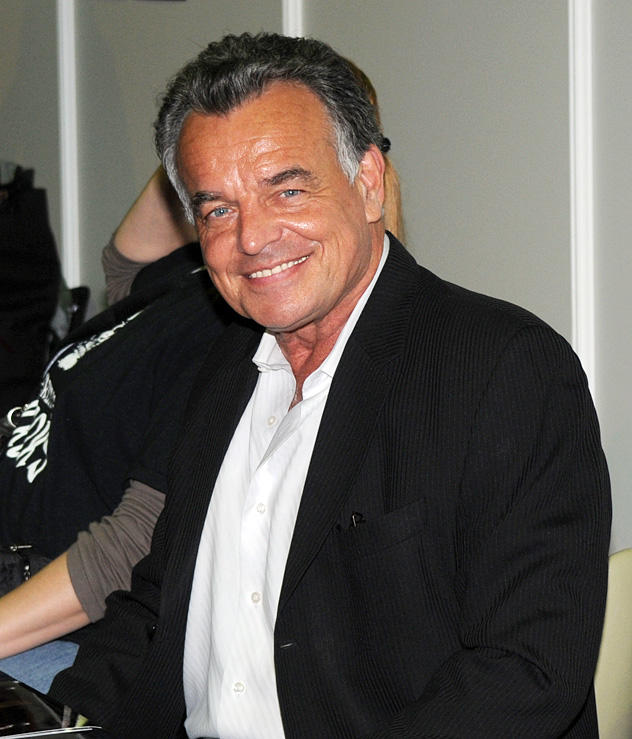
- Wise in 2011
- Born: Raymond Herbert Wise; August 20, 1947 (age 79); Akron, Ohio, U.S.
- Occupation: Actor
- Years active: 1969–present
- Spouses: Juliet Burr (m. 1974; div. 1977) Kass McClaskey (m. 1978)
- Children: 2

Raymond Herbert Wise (born August 20, 1947) is an American actor best known for his role as Leland Palmer in Twin Peaks (1990–1991, 2017) and its prequel film Twin Peaks: Fire Walk with Me (1992). He has appeared in films such as Swamp Thing (1982), The Journey of Natty Gann (1985), RoboCop (1987), Bob Roberts (1992), Jeepers Creepers 2 (2003), Dead End (2003), Good Night, and Good Luck (2005), X-Men: First Class (2011) and God's Not Dead 2 (2016).

Wise's other television roles include Vice President Hal Gardner in 24 (2006), The Devil in Reaper (2007–2009), Ian Ward in The Young and the Restless (2014–2016, 2024–2026) and Marvin Ellis in Fresh Off the Boat (2015–2020). He is also known for acting in projects produced by the comedy duo Tim & Eric, most notably his guest-starring role as Grill Vogel in Tim and Eric Awesome Show, Great Job! (2008).

== Early life ==
Wise was born in Akron, Ohio, on August 20, 1947, graduated from Garfield High School in 1965 and attended Kent State University in Kent, Ohio. He is of Romanian descent on his maternal side. He grew up in a religious family; in the past he went to a Romanian Baptist church in Akron and later moved to a Methodist church.

== Career ==
=== Television ===
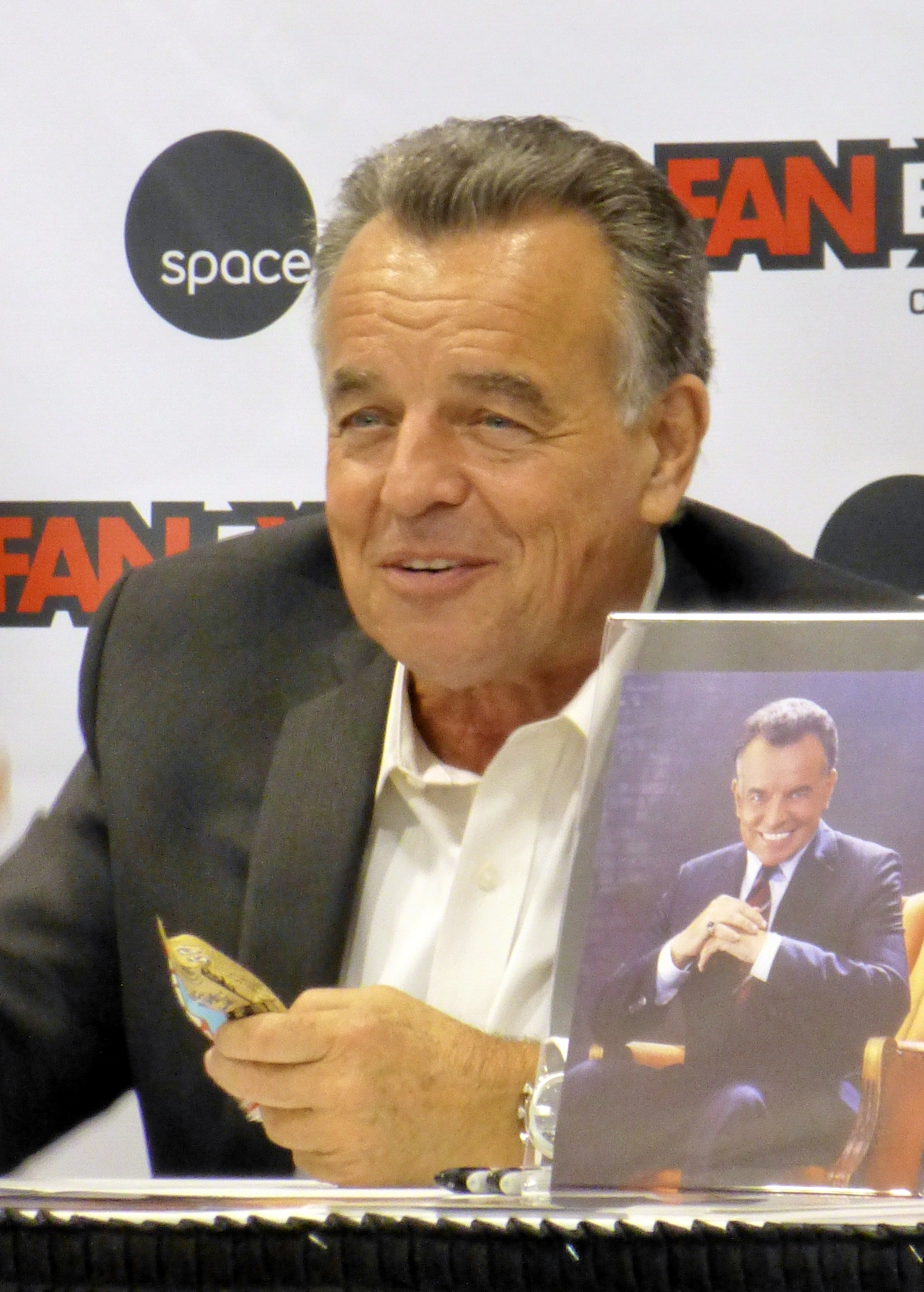
Wise at the 2014 Fan Expo Canada

In the late 1960s and 70s, Wise played attorney Jamie Rollins in the soap opera Love of Life for seven years and nearly 950 episodes. In 1987, Wise played Tom Gunther, Catherine Chandler's boyfriend, in the pilot episode of the TV series Beauty and the Beast. Wise is best known for his role as Laura Palmer's father Leland in Twin Peaks. In addition to Twin Peaks, Wise has played several roles in science fiction. He made an appearance as Liko in the Star Trek: The Next Generation episode "Who Watches the Watchers", later playing Arturis in the Star Trek: Voyager episode "Hope and Fear".

He appeared in the Season 7 episode "The Flame" of Diagnosis: Murder. He was featured in three episodes of Tim and Eric Awesome Show, Great Job! as Grill Vogel, the presenter of a fictitious instructional video series called "Business Hugs".

In 1995, Wise was reunited with Twin Peaks castmate Sherilyn Fenn in the NBC telemovie Liz: The Elizabeth Taylor Story. He also starred as the Devil on the TV series Reaper. Wise has appeared on a number of political-themed television series and films. He briefly appeared on The West Wing as California governor Gabriel "Gabe" Tillman, and played Vice President Hal Gardner on 24 in 2006. In August 2006, Wise made a guest appearance in the series Bones as the primary suspect of the first episode of the second season ("The Titan on the Tracks"), and in the pilot episode of Burn Notice. In Season 8, episode 13 of Law & Order: Special Victims Unit (2007), Wise guest starred as the head of a company testing pesticides on little children. Wise has also guest starred in two episodes of The Closer, as lawyer Tom Blanchard. He starred in Charmed as the upper level demon Ludlow, who runs a school for the Source Of All Evil in the episode "Lost and Bound". He had a small role in one episode of the sixth season of Dawson's Creek, playing Roger Stepateck. Wise starred in the 2009 SyFy original movie Infestation. He played the lead as Avery in a psychological thriller, Iodine, in 2009. He was a guest star on Psych and in 2010, in a special episode of Psych titled "Dual Spires", he joined his fellow Twin Peaks alumni Dana Ashbrook, Robyn Lively, Lenny Von Dohlen, Sheryl Lee, Catherine E. Coulson, and Sherilyn Fenn in a spoof of Twin Peaks.

Wise appeared in several episodes of Mad Men as Ken Cosgrove's father-in-law Ed Baxter, the CEO of Corning, Inc. He appeared in "Chinese Wall" (Season 4, Episode 11), "At the Codfish Ball" (Season 5, Episode 7), "Commissions and Fees" (Season 5, Episode 12), "To Have and to Hold" (Season 6, Episode 4) and "Severance" (Season 7, Episode 8).

In 2010, Wise guest-starred as fictitious sports agent Bobby Fox alongside a special guest appearance from real life ex-Yankees manager Joe Torre on the TV series Castle, in the Season 2 episode "Suicide Squeeze". He also guest starred on Dollhouse as Howard, a higher-up in the Dollhouse organization. He stars in Kyle Rankin's post-apocalyptic horror thriller film Nuclear Family. Wise was announced the lead of the Mike Mendez thriller film Ov3rk!ll.

Wise appeared in Season 4 of Chuck and in the FX television show Wilfred as a popular TV personality. He was cast in the part of Robin Scherbatsky's father on How I Met Your Mother in December 2010 (after Eric Braeden declined to reprise his role in a cameo appearance), and ultimately appeared in 6 episodes of the series in total. Ray made a cameo appearance as a modeling agent in episode four of season 2 of Workaholics.

Wise made an appearance in 2012 in the TV series Rizzoli & Isles (Season 3, Episode 7, "Crazy for You") in drag as a cross-dressing judge. That same year, Ray played John Nelson, A disturbed ex-mortician obsessed with trying to help his wife Linda in the Criminal Minds Season 8 episode "God Complex".

Wise prominently appeared in the music video "Wishes" for the group Beach House. It was directed by Eric Wareheim and features Wise performing in a surreal football halftime show.

Wise appeared as Andy Rooney parody Skip Reming on Newsreaders. In January 2014, he was hired to play the character of Ian Ward on the long running soap The Young and the Restless. He returned to Y&R in September 2015. He played the mayor in the first season of Deadbeat. Since 2014, he has appeared in multiple series on ABC. He had a recurring role as Marvin in the first two seasons of Fresh Off the Boat before being promoted to series regular for seasons three through six. He also appeared in the first two seasons of Agent Carter as comic book character Hugh Jones.

In 2016, Wise appeared in the Netflix series Gilmore Girls: A Year in the Life. He portrayed Jack Smith, an old friend of Richard Gilmore, who becomes the boyfriend or companion of widow Emily Gilmore.

In 2017, he appeared as a guest in the TV series Fargo, as Paul Marrane, a kitten-handler and metaphysical punisher, in the episodes "The Law of Non-Contradiction" and "Who Rules the Land of Denial?".

=== Film ===
He played the character of Dr. Alec Holland in the 1982 film Swamp Thing, directed by Wes Craven and based upon the comic book series of the same name. Dr. Holland is the man who becomes the titular character after his lab is destroyed and he is left for dead. The actual Swamp Thing character was played by Dick Durock.

In 1985, Wise was cast as Sol Gann, father to Natty Gann in the Disney film The Journey of Natty Gann, directed by Jeremy Paul Kagan, and then appeared as henchman Leon C. Nash in RoboCop (1987). He also had roles in Season of Fear (1989), The Rift (1990), Bob Roberts (1992), Grey Knight (1993) and Rising Sun (1993).

He then played the roles of entrepreneur/millionaire Dalton Voss in The Chase (1994), Dr. Stripler in Powder (1995), Sheriff Blaidek in Evasive Action (1998), and Bart's father Harrison in The Battle of Shaker Heights (2003). The same year he played Jack Taggart in the horror film Jeepers Creepers 2, and portrayed father and husband Frank Harrington in the horror film Dead End.

In 2005, he appeared as newscaster and commentator Don Hollenbeck in Good Night, and Good Luck, directed by George Clooney. In 2007 he appeared in The Flock as Robert Still. In 2008 he had a role in the horror remake One Missed Call. In the year 2011, Wise played the role of United States Secretary of State in X-Men: First Class. He appeared in Tim and Eric's Billion Dollar Movie as Dr. Doone Struts, the leader of the Shrim Healing Center. He appeared in Revelation Road: The Beginning of the End as Franks. He played Major Braxton Tanner in the movie Big Ass Spider! (2013). He was in Brother's Keeper (2013) and was in Suburban Gothic (2014).

In 2014 Wise appeared in the documentary horror film Digging Up the Marrow under the direction of Adam Green. In 2016, Wise starred as attorney Peter Kane in the film God's Not Dead 2, who represents the ACLU in its fight to have the protagonist, Grace Wesley (Melissa Joan Hart), convicted of proselytizing in a public school.

In 2024, Wise starred in the short proof-of-concept film The Wolf in the Well under the direction of Adam Zanzie. Wise played Roland Carmel, a troubled novelist whose daughter, Teresina (Brittani O'Connell), is abducted by an undead wolf; Roland then forces filmmaker Marcello Liscio (Adam Zanzie) to descend into a stone well to rescue Teresina. The film premiered in December 2024 at the Arkadin Cinema in St. Louis, Missouri. Later, it received an Honorable Mention for "Best Nocturnal Film" at the Night of Shorts festival in Milan, Italy, and it was shown at the 2025 Hollywood Reel Independent Film Festival.

=== Presidential work ===
Wise is noted for repeatedly portraying higher elected officers of the US, having played the president (in Red Alert 2) and Vice President Hal Gardner on 24.

=== Voice work ===
As a voice actor, Wise played Perry White in the movie Superman: Doomsday. He also plays Commissioner Gordon in the animated film adaptation of The Killing Joke. He also played various Gotham characters in the first series of the podcast Batman: The Audio Adventures.

=== Video games ===
He is also known for portraying Michael Dugan, President of the United States, in the full-motion video cutscenes for the computer real-time strategy game Command & Conquer: Red Alert 2 and its expansion, Yuri's Revenge.

=== Web series ===
In 2014, Wise starred in an original Chipotle web series titled Farmed and Dangerous; he played Buck Marshall in the satirical black comedy-type situation comedy. In 2018, Wise made a guest appearance in the second volume of Hyper RPG's horror anthology RPG, 10 Candles, explaining to the party the mysteries of the town of Kolob. He reprised that role in 2019 for the opening credits of 'Kollok 1991', another RPG series by Hyper RPG.

== Personal life ==
Wise has been married to film producer Kass McClaskey since 1978. They have two children together: a son, Gannon McClaskey Wise, born in 1985, who is an actor and writer; and a daughter, Kyna Wise, born in 1987, who is also an actress and a singer.

== Filmography ==
=== Film ===
Year	Title	Role	Notes
1969	Dare the Devil	David Keller	
1980	Dallas Cowboys Cheerleaders II	Doctor Simmons	TV movie
1982	Swamp Thing	Dr. Alec Holland	
1982	Cat People	Soap Opera Man	
1985	The Journey of Natty Gann	Sol Gann	
1987	RoboCop	Leon Nash	
1989	Season of Fear	Fred Drummond	
1989	Race for Glory	Jack Davis	
1990	The Rift	Robbins	
1992	Twin Peaks: Fire Walk with Me	Leland Palmer	
1992	Bob Roberts	Chet MacGregor	
1993	Ghost Brigade	Col. George Thalman	Direct-to-video
1993	Rising Sun	Senator John Morton	
1994	The Chase	Dalton Voss	
1994	Body Shot	Dwight Frye	
1994	The Crew	Charles Pierce	
1995	Powder	Dr. Aaron Stripler	
1998	Evasive Action	Sheriff Wes Blaidek	
1999	Pennyweight	Mr. Pennyweight	Short film
2000	Closing the Deal	Ford Williams	
2001	Almost Salinas	Jack Tynan	
2001	Two Can Play That Game	Bill Parker	
2002	Landspeed	Brian Sanger	
2002	Scream at the Sound of the Beep	Brother Jake	
2003	Dead End	Frank Harrington	
2003	Jeepers Creepers 2	Jack Taggart Sr.	
2003	The Battle of Shaker Heights	Harrison	
2005	Sharkskin 6	Sam	
2005	The Rain Makers	Harris	
2005	Good Night, and Good Luck	Don Hollenbeck	Nominated — Screen Actors Guild Award for Outstanding Performance by a Cast in a Motion Picture
2005	Cyxork 7	Kommander 88	
2006	The Substance of Things Hoped For	Dr. Lessing	
2006	Peaceful Warrior	Doctor Hayden	
2007	The Election	Peter	Short film
2007	The Flock	Bobby Stiles	
2007	Hellholes	Professor Klume	Short film
2007	Superman: Doomsday	Perry White	Voice; Direct-to-DVD
2008	Reservations	Mitch	
2008	One Missed Call	Ted Summers	
2008	AM1200	Harry Jones	Short film
2008	AmericanEast	Agent Stevens	
2009	Pandemic	General Matthews	
2009	Infestation	Ethan	
2009	Stuntmen	Jack Strongbow	
2009	Iodine	Avery	
2009	Love at First Hiccup	Roger	
2010	Darnell Dawkins: Mouth Guitar Legend	Wade Dawkins	
2011	Black Velvet	Black Velvet	
2011	X-Men: First Class	Secretary of State	
2011	Chillerama	Dr. Weems	Segment: "Wadzilla"
2011	Rosewood Lane	Det. Danny Briggs	
2012	Tim and Eric's Billion Dollar Movie	Dr. Doone Struts	
2012	Excision	Principal Campbell	
2012	The Aggression Scale	Bellavance	
2012	Crazy Eyes	Zach's Father	
2012	FDR: American Badass!	Douglas MacArthur	
2012	The Butterfly Room	Nick	
2012	Atlas Shrugged: Part II	Head of State Thompson	
2012	Brother White	Pastor Johnny Kingman	
2012	Posey	Dr. Shap	Short film
2013	Wrong Cops	Captain Andy	
2013	Inventing Adam	J.B.	
2013	Big Ass Spider!	Major Braxton C. Tanner	
2013	Revelation Road: Beginning of the End	Frank	
2013	Lionhead	Jimmy	
2013	Revelation Road 2: The Sea of Glass and Fire	Frank	
2013	Out West	Phillip Alcott	
2013	Brother's Keeper	Herbert Leemaster	
2013	No God, No Master	A. Mitchell Palmer	
2014	Away from Here	Paul	
2014	Suburban Gothic	Donald	
2014	Land of Leopold	Deece Warren	
2014	Digging Up the Marrow	William Dekker	
2014	Dead Still	Wenton Davis	
2014	Guardian Angel	Attorney Kaufman	
2014	Reflections	Grandpa	Short film
2015	Jurassic City	Warden Lewis	
2015	The Lazarus Effect	Mr. Wallace	
2015	Night of the Living Deb	Frank Waverly	
2015	Taking Flight	Nono	Voice; Short film
2015	The Breakup Girl	Bob Baker	
2015	The Specialist	The Specialist	Short film
2015	Unnatural	Victor Clobirch	
2016	Halloweed	Judge Pilmington	
2016	God's Not Dead 2	Peter Kane	
2016	The Bronx Bull	Father Joseph	
2016	Batman: The Killing Joke	Commissioner Gordon	Voice
2016	Star Trek: Captain Pike	Admiral Joshua Pike	
2017	Shattered	Forest Burnett	
2019	Tone-Deaf	Michael	
2019	Chain of Death	Michael	
2019	Unholy 'Mole	The Devil	Short film
2019	To Your Last Death	Cyrus DeKalb	Voice
2019	Big Fan Begins	Ticket Man	Short film
2020	Beast Mode	Trammel Steadfast	
2021	King Knight	Merlin	
2023	Poolman	Van Patterson	
2023	The Blue Rose	Mr. Vallens	
2024	God's Not Dead: In God We Trust	Pete Kane	
2024	The Wolf in the Well	Roland Carmel	Short film
2025	The Napa Boys	Officer Toland	

=== Television ===
Year	Title	Role	Notes
1970–1976	Love of Life	Jamie Rawlins #2	
1978	Charlie's Angels	Evan Wilcox	Episode: "Winning Is for Losers"
1978	Barnaby Jones	Malcolm Elliot	Episode: "Stages of Fear"
1978	Tartuffe	Damis	Television film
1981	Lou Grant	Bart Franklin	Episode: "Strike"
1981	Madame X	Bellman	Uncredited; Television film
1982	Dallas	Blair Sullivan	8 episodes
1982–1983	Days of Our Lives	Hal Rummley	
1983	The Mississippi	Cole	Episode: "Joey"
1984	T. J. Hooker	Harrison Mackenzie	Episode: "Hot Property"
1984	Blue Thunder	J.D. Kraft	Episode: "Payload"
1984	Emerald Point N.A.S.	Travis	2 episodes
1984	Hart to Hart	Dick Braddon	Episode: "Larsen's Last Jump"
1984	Trapper John, M.D.	Dr. Henry Speiner	Episode: "Aunt Mildred Is Watching"
1984	Riptide	Les Carter	Episode: "Beat the Box"
1984	Remington Steele	Schwimmer	Episode: "A Pocketful of Steele"
1985	The A-Team	Phillip Chadway	Episode: "Lease with an Option to Die"
1986	Scarecrow and Mrs. King	Frank Duran	Episode: "The Pharaoh's Engineer"
1986	Airwolf	Victor Resnick	Episode: "Hawke's Run"
1986	Stingray	Dr. John Whitaker	Episode: "Ether"
1986	The Colbys	Spiro Koralis	5 episodes
1986	Hunter	Alex Parker	Episode: "Crime of Passion"
1986	Condor	Christopher Proctor	Television film
1987	Beauty and the Beast	Tom	Episode: "Once Upon a Time"
1987	Private Eye	Senator McNeill	Episode: "Blue Movie"
1988	Knots Landing	The Dealer	5 episodes
1988	L.A. Law	Walter Platt	2 episodes
1988	The Taking of Flight 847: The Uli Derickson Story	Phil Maresca	Television film
1989	Moonlighting	Murderer	Episode: "Eine Kleine Nacht Murder"
1989	Star Trek: The Next Generation	Liko	Episode: "Who Watches the Watchers"
1989	Jake and the Fatman	Harry McGinn	Episode: "Dancing in the Dark"
1990–1991	Twin Peaks	Leland Palmer	18 episodes
1992	Swamp Thing	Guthrie	Episode: "Never Alone"
1993	The Secrets of Lake Success	Henry Fleming	3 episodes
1993–1994	Second Chances	Judge Jim Stinson	6 episodes
1994	Walker, Texas Ranger	Garrett Carlson	Episode: "Stolen Lullaby"
1994	The Larry Sanders Show	Lloyd Simon	Episode: "You're Having My Baby"
1995	Liz: The Elizabeth Taylor Story	Mike Todd	Television film
1995	Dream On	Maddox March	Episode: "Significant Author"
1995	Courthouse	Congressman Laderman	Episode: "One Flew Over the Courthouse"
1996–1997	Savannah	Edward Burton	34 episodes
1998	The Wonderful World of Disney	Randolph Pratt	Episode: "The Garbage Picking Field Goal Kicking Philadelphia Phenomenon"
1998	Star Trek: Voyager	Arturis	Episode: "Hope and Fear"
1997–1998	Sleepwalkers	McCaig	2 episodes
1998	Beverly Hills, 90210	Daniel Hunter	2 episodes
1998	Vengeance Unlimited	Jack Schiller	Episode: "Cruel and Unusual"
1998	Sports Night	Evans	Episode: "Mary Pat Shelby"
1999	Diagnosis: Murder	John Parkinson	Episode: "The Flame"
2000	Profiler	James Perrone	Episode: "Quid Pro Quo"
2000	Popular	Barton	Episode: "What Makes Sammy Run"
2000–2001	Resurrection Blvd.	Jack Mornay	12 episodes
2001	V.I.P.	Judge Kreiger	Episode: "Bodyguards"
2001	RoboCop: Prime Directives	Leon C. Nash (archive footage, uncredited)	Episode: "Resurrection"
2001	Judging Amy	Atty. Rhodes	Episode: "The Last Word"
2001	Dead Last	Robert Cahill	Episode: "Jane's Exit"
2002	Charmed	Ludlow	Episode: "Lost and Bound"
2002	She Spies	Ambassador Blaine	Episode: "Daddy's Girl"
2002	Presidio Med		Episode: "Milagros"
2003	Dawson's Creek	Roger Stepavich	Episode: "All the Right Moves"
2004	JAG	Congressman Marvin Bolton	Episode: "Retrial"
2005	The West Wing	Governor Tillman D-CA	Episode: "La Palabra"
2006	24	Vice President Hal Gardner	6 episodes
2006	CSI: Crime Scene Investigation	Ernest Chase	Episode: "Rashomama"
2006	The Closer	Tom Blanchard	2 episodes
2006	Bones	Rick Turco	Episode: "The Titan on the Tracks"
2007	Law & Order: Special Victims Unit	Roger Hanley	Episode: "Loophole"
2007	Shark	Lloyd Holcomb	Episode: "Starlet Fever"
2007	Six Degrees	Henry Crane	Episode: "Sedgewick's"
2007	Burn Notice	Mr. Pyne	Episode: "Pilot"
2007–2009	Reaper	The Devil	31 episodes
2008	Tim and Eric Awesome Show, Great Job!	Grill Vogel	2 episodes
2009	Numb3rs	Mitch Langford	Episode: "Guilt Trip"
2009	Drop Dead Diva	Frank Dodd	Episode: "What If?"
2009	Dollhouse	Howard Lipman	Episode: "The Left Hand"
2009–2010; 2014	Psych	Father Peter Westley / Judge Horace Leland	3 episodes
2010	Castle	Bobby Fox	Episode: "Suicide Squeeze"
2010	Suitemates	Hans Ahnnansoahnn	2 episodes
2010	The Good Guys	Buddy	Episode: "Common Enemies"
2010–2015	Mad Men	Ed Baxter	5 episodes
2011	Hawaii Five-0	Morris Brown	Episode: "Powa Maka Moana"
2011	Mr. Sunshine	Macaulay	Episode: "Heather's Sister"
2011	Chuck	Riley	3 episodes
2011	Wilfred	Colt St. Cloud	Episode: "Identity"
2011	Workaholics	Kyle Walsh	Episode: "Model Kombat"
2011	Easy to Assemble	Hendrik	3 episodes
2011	90210	Dean Thomas	Episode: "It's the Great Masquerade, Naomi Clark"
2011–2014	How I Met Your Mother	Robin Scherbatsky Sr.	6 episodes
2012	Battleground	D-Day / Tak's Father	2 episodes
2012	NCIS	Wayne Tobett	Episode: "Secrets"
2012	Holliston	Landlord	Episode: "Camera Rental: Part 1"
2012	The Mentalist	Dennis Victor	Episode: "Red Rover, Red Rover"
2012	Rizzoli & Isles	Judge Eugene Allen	Episode: "Crazy for You"
2012	Criminal Minds	John Nelson	Episode: "God Complex"
2013	Body of Proof	Michael Davis	Episode: "Mob Mentality"
2013	Perception	Martin Sullivan	Episode: "Toxic"
2013	Twisted Tales	Mongo the Magnificent	Episode: "Mongo's Magik Mirror"
2013	High School USA!	Seymour Barren / Cassandra's Dad	Voices; 3 episodes
2013–2014	Kroll Show	Network Executive / Wendy's Father	3 episodes
2013–2015	Newsreaders	Skip Reming	19 episodes
2014	Farmed and Dangerous	Buck Marshall	4 episodes
2014	Deadbeat	Mayor Meyer	Episode: "Sixty Feet Under"
2014	Infomercials	Frank Pierre	Episode: "Frank Pierre Presents: Pierre Resort & Casino"
2014	Hit the Floor	Officiant	Episode: "Winner Takes All"
2014–2016, 2024–2026	The Young and the Restless	Ian Ward	98 episodes
2015–2016	Agent Carter	Hugh Jones	4 episodes
2015–2020	Fresh Off the Boat	Marvin	73 episodes
2016	Relationship Status	Grace's Dad	Episode: "The Catch"
2016	All the Way	Senator Everett Dirksen	Television film
2016	Comedy Bang! Bang!	Psychologist / Dr. Frankenstein	2 episodes
2016	Adam Ruins Everything	Netflix Executive	Episode: "Adam Ruins Hollywood"
2016	Gilmore Girls: A Year in the Life	Jack Smith	3 episodes
2016	Hitting The Breaks	Theodore 'Teddy' Montclair	2 episodes
2017	Fargo	Paul Marrane	2 episodes
2017	Idiotsitter	Himself	Episode: "Rush, Rush"
2017	Twin Peaks: The Return	Leland Palmer	2 episodes
2017	Tim and Eric's Bedtime Stories	The Duke	Episode: "The Duke"
2017–2018	Neo Yokio	Old Man	Voice; 2 episodes
2019	Hot Streets	Plunch Runch	Voice; Episode: "The Moon Masters"
2019	Chilling Adventures of Sabrina	Enoch	Episode: "Chapter Sixteen: Blackwood"
2021	All Rise	Richard Walker	Episode: "Georgia"
2021	Launchpad	Headmaster Gustafson	Episode: "Dinner Is Served"
2021	Physical	Sheila's Father	Episode: "Let's Not and Say We Did"
2021	Home Economics	Frank	Episode: "49ers Foam Finger, $7"
2021	Psych 3: This Is Gus	Father Peter Westley	Television film

=== Video game ===
Year	Title	Role
2000	Command & Conquer: Red Alert 2	President Michael Dugan
2001	Command & Conquer: Yuri's Revenge	President Michael Dugan

=== Web series ===
Year	Title	Role	Notes
2018	10 Candles	Kolob Council Member	Episode: "The Town: Finale"
2019	Kollok 1991	Video narrator	Intro sequence

=== Audio ===
Year	Title	Role	Notes
2021	Batman: The Audio Adventures	Announcer	Podcast
