= Legs (film) =

1983 American musical drama film

- Genre: Drama; Musical
- Written by: Jerrold Freedman; Brian Garfield
- Directed by: Jerrold Freedman
- Starring: Shanna Reed; Deborah Geffner; Lawrence Leritz; David Marshall Grant; John Heard; Maureen Teefy; Eileen Collins; Gwen Verdon
- Music by: Lee Holdridge
- Country of origin: United States
- Original language: English

Production
- Executive producer: Gregory Harrison
- Producers: Ronald Parker; Franklin Levy; Bernard Gersten
- Cinematography: Allen Daviau
- Editor: Anthony Redman
- Running time: 95 minutes
- Production company: The Catalina Production Group

Original release
- Network: ABC
- Release: May 2, 1983

Legs is a 1983 American made-for-television musical drama film starring Shanna Reed, Deborah Geffner, Lawrence Leritz, David Marshall Grant, Maureen Teefy, and Gwen Verdon. It was directed by Jerrold Freedman and written by Freedman and Brian Garfield. The film was retitled Rockettes for its UK video release.

This film was Gwen Verdon's television film debut and using the talents of the 1982 Rockettes was partially filmed on stage at Radio City Music Hall. The film had several public screenings there prior to its television release.

== Plot ==
The film follows three women, Lisa Norwood, Terry Riga and Melissa Rizzo, who are auditioning in front of choreographer Maureen Comly, hoping to fill the one open spot in the chorus line of the famous US precision dance company, The Radio City Music Hall Rockettes.

== Cast ==
- Shanna Reed as Lisa Norwood
- Deborah Geffner as Terry Riga
- Maureen Teefy as Melissa Rizzo
- Gwen Verdon as Maureen Comly
- David Marshall Grant as Sid Lewis
- John Heard as Dan Foster
- Sheree North as Ida
- Eileen Collins as Barbara
- Marilyn Cooper as Rita
- Lawrence L. Leritz as Radio City Music Hall New Yorker
- Ron Karabatsos as Mr. Rizzo
- Barton Heyman as Larry Clark
- Margery Nelson as Aunt Agnes
- Mace Barrett as Bob Schaeffer
- Jonathan Stockley as John
- Vera Lockwood as Mrs. Rizzo
- Carol Harbich as Paula
- Ethyl Will as Ethyl
- Robert King as Freddie Taylor
