= Season of Fear =

- Directed by: Doug Campbell
- Screenplay by: Doug Campbell
- Story by: Scott J. Mulvaney
- Produced by: Scott J. Mulvaney
- Starring: Michael Bowen; Ray Wise; Clare Wren; Michael J. Pollard; Clancy Brown
- Cinematography: Chuy Elizondo
- Edited by: Dan Selakovich
- Music by: Hawk Wolinski
- Production companies: City Filmworks; Filmstar; GCO
- Distributed by: United Artists
- Release date: May 12, 1989
- Running time: 89 minutes
- Country: United States
- Language: English

Season of Fear is a 1989 American thriller film written and directed by Doug Campbell. The film stars Michael Bowen, Ray Wise, Clare Wren, Michael J. Pollard and Clancy Brown. The film was released on May 12, 1989, by United Artists.

== Plot ==
Fred Drummond (Ray Wise) longs to reconnect with his adult son, Mick (Michael Bowen). Fred hasn't been part of Mick's life for two decades. In the meantime, he has married Sarah (Clare Wren), a gorgeous woman many years his junior. The reunion seems to go well—until Mick and Sarah begin a tumultuous affair. If the bizarre love triangle between father, son and stepmother weren't dangerous enough, it soon gives life to a conspiracy that's even more complicated and deadly

== Cast ==
- Michael Bowen as Mick Drummond
- Ray Wise as Fred Drummond
- Clare Wren as Sarah Drummond
- Michael J. Pollard as Bob
- Clancy Brown as Ward St. Clair
- Heather Jane MacDonald as Penny
- Dean Fortunato as David
- Gregory R. Wolf as Bartender
- Susan Cherones as Cindy
- Janice Doskey as Ranch Woman
- Gannon McClaskey Wise as Young Mick
- Heino G. Moeller as Bar Patron
- Chrissy McCarthy as Bar Patron
- Henry Harris as Hank
- Rocky Capella as Precision Driver
