= Jonathan Majors =

American actor (born 1989)

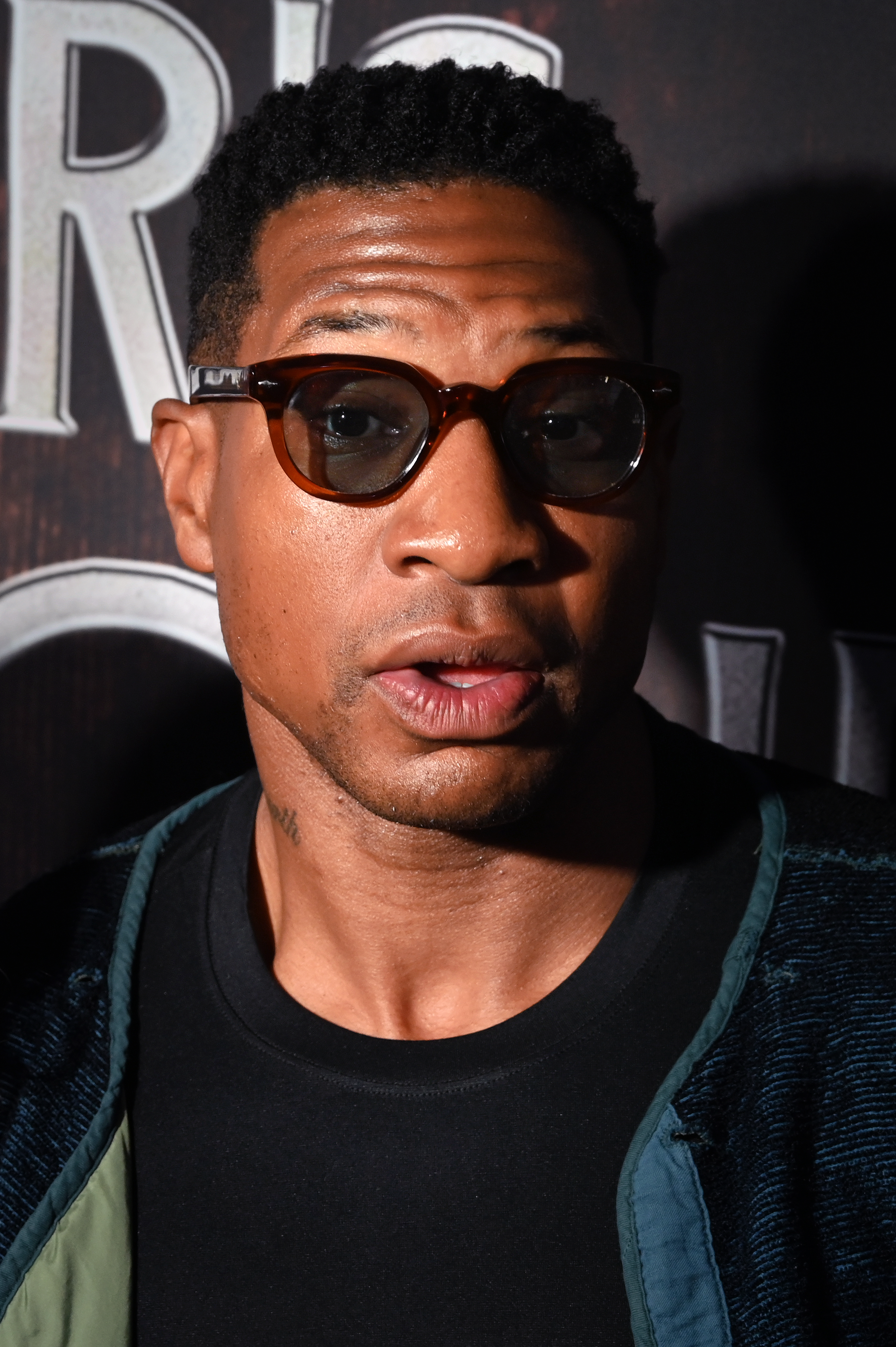
- Majors in 2026
- Born: Jonathan Michael Majors; September 7, 1989 (age 37); Lompoc, California, U.S.
- Citizenship: United States; Guinea
- Education: University of North Carolina School of the Arts (BFA); Yale University (MFA)
- Occupation: Actor
- Years active: 2017–present
- Spouse: Meagan Good (m. 2025)
- Children: 1

Jonathan Michael Majors (born September 7, 1989) is an American actor. A graduate of the Yale School of Drama, Majors rose to prominence for starring in the drama films The Last Black Man in San Francisco (2019) and Da 5 Bloods (2020), as well as the HBO horror series Lovecraft Country (2020), for which he received a Primetime Emmy Award nomination.

Majors has since portrayed Nat Love in the western The Harder They Fall (2021), Jesse L. Brown in the war film Devotion (2022), and main antagonist Damian Anderson in the sports film Creed III (2023). In the Marvel Cinematic Universe (MCU), he portrayed Kang the Conqueror in the film Ant-Man and the Wasp: Quantumania (2023), while also appearing as other variants of the character in the Disney+ series Loki (2021–2023).

In March 2023, Majors was arrested for physically assaulting his ex-girlfriend Grace Jabbari. That December, he was found guilty of two misdemeanor counts of physical assault and sexual harassment. After the conviction, he was dropped from numerous upcoming projects, including any future involvement with the MCU. He subsequently completed a 52-week in-person domestic violence intervention program.

In February 2026, it was reported that Majors had started shooting his first film in three years for The Daily Wire. The film, Run Hide Fight: Infidels, was released on September 16, 2026.

== Early life ==
Majors was born in Santa Barbara County, California, and spent his early years living with his mother, who is a pastor, his older sister, and younger brother on the Vandenberg military base, as his father was in the US Air Force. In 2020, Majors said "Our father, who loved us dearly, just kind of disappeared one day ... and he resurfaced 17 years later." Majors has since reconnected with his father. The family moved around various cities in Texas, including Dallas, Georgetown, and Cedar Hill. He attended Cedar Hill High School and graduated from Duncanville High School in 2008.

Majors has described himself as having had a "difficult" childhood, growing up with drug dealers and murderers for neighbors who wore ankle monitors on their release from prison. As a teenager, Majors was arrested for shoplifting, suspended from high school for fighting, and lived in his car while working two jobs after being kicked out of his house. He eventually found a "safe space" in the world of theatre, which he joined after watching Christopher Nolan's The Dark Knight. Majors credits Heath Ledger's Joker as the reason he became an actor, and why he seeks to be an inspiration to others.

Majors studied for his bachelor's degree at the University of North Carolina School of the Arts, and later attended the Yale School of Drama; he graduated with a Master of Fine Arts in 2016.

== Career ==
=== 2017–2019: Early roles and breakthrough ===
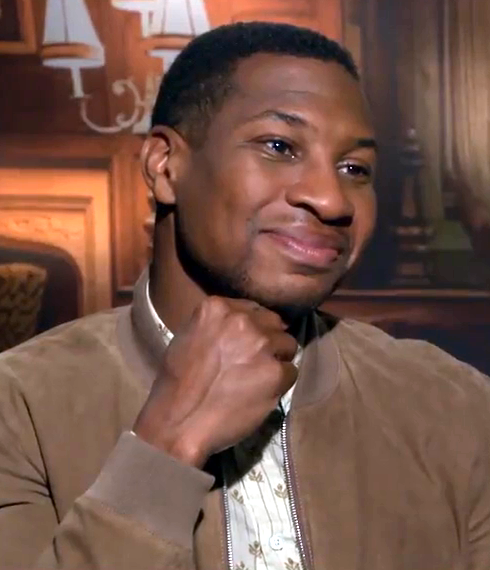
Majors in 2018

Majors secured his first onscreen role in the ABC miniseries When We Rise while still a student at Yale. In the series, Majors portrayed real-life gay activist Ken Jones; as part of his research for the role, he met with Jones before playing him. That same year, Majors appeared in his first feature film role as Corporal Henry Woodson in the revisionist Western film Hostiles, written and directed by Scott Cooper. The film had its world premiere at the Telluride Film Festival on September 2, 2017 and was also screened at the 2017 Toronto International Film Festival on September 10, 2017. More roles followed, in the 2018 films White Boy Rick and Out of Blue. Both of these films screened at the 2018 Toronto International Film Festival, with the latter competing for the Platform Prize.

In 2019, Majors rose to prominence after starring in Joe Talbot's critically acclaimed independent feature film The Last Black Man in San Francisco, for which he received an Independent Spirit Award nomination. The film had its world premiere at the 2019 Sundance Film Festival on January 26, 2019 and was released by A24 in the United States on June 7, 2019. Former President of the United States Barack Obama rated it as one of the best films of 2019. Majors' performance was praised by critics: Manohla Dargis of The New York Times called his performance "a mournful heartbreaker", while Rolling Stone described his turn as "both deeply sensitive and charmingly left-of-center". Majors also appeared in three other 2019 film releases: Captive State, Gully, and Jungleland.

=== 2020–2023: Marvel films and leading roles ===
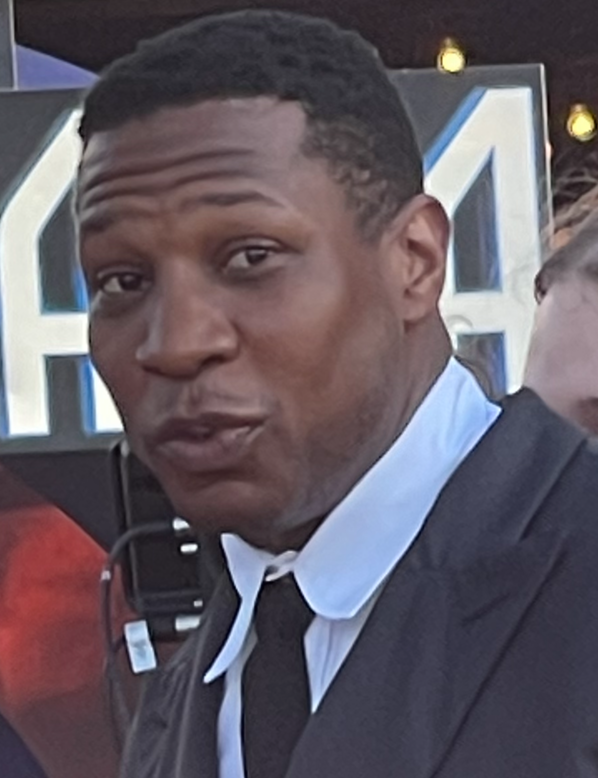
Majors in 2023

In 2020, Majors starred alongside Chadwick Boseman and Delroy Lindo in Spike Lee's war drama film Da 5 Bloods, which was released on Netflix. That year, he also garnered wider notice for portraying Atticus Freeman in the HBO television series Lovecraft Country. His performance in Lovecraft Country was favorably reviewed by critics; Vogue dubbed him "the emotional core of the show". In 2021, Majors starred as the lead actor in Jeymes Samuel's directorial debut film The Harder They Fall, acting alongside Idris Elba, Zazie Beetz, Regina King and Lindo. In 2023, he starred in Magazine Dreams and co-starred alongside Michael B. Jordan in Creed III. The former film was screened at the 2019 Sundance Film Festival in January 2023 and acquired by Searchlight Pictures for a release in December that year, but was later pulled from release and ultimately returned quietly to its producers following Majors' harassment and assault conviction. It was ultimately released theatrically by Briarcliff Entertainment in March 2025.

Majors debuted in the Marvel Cinematic Universe Disney+ series Loki as "He Who Remains" and portrayed Kang the Conqueror in Ant-Man and the Wasp: Quantumania. He then appeared as Victor Timely, a time divergent version of Kang, in Loki season 2. All these appearances aimed to tease Kang, played by Majors, as the main antagonist in future Marvel Cinematic Universe projects.

=== 2023–present: Post-assault conviction, hiatus and return ===
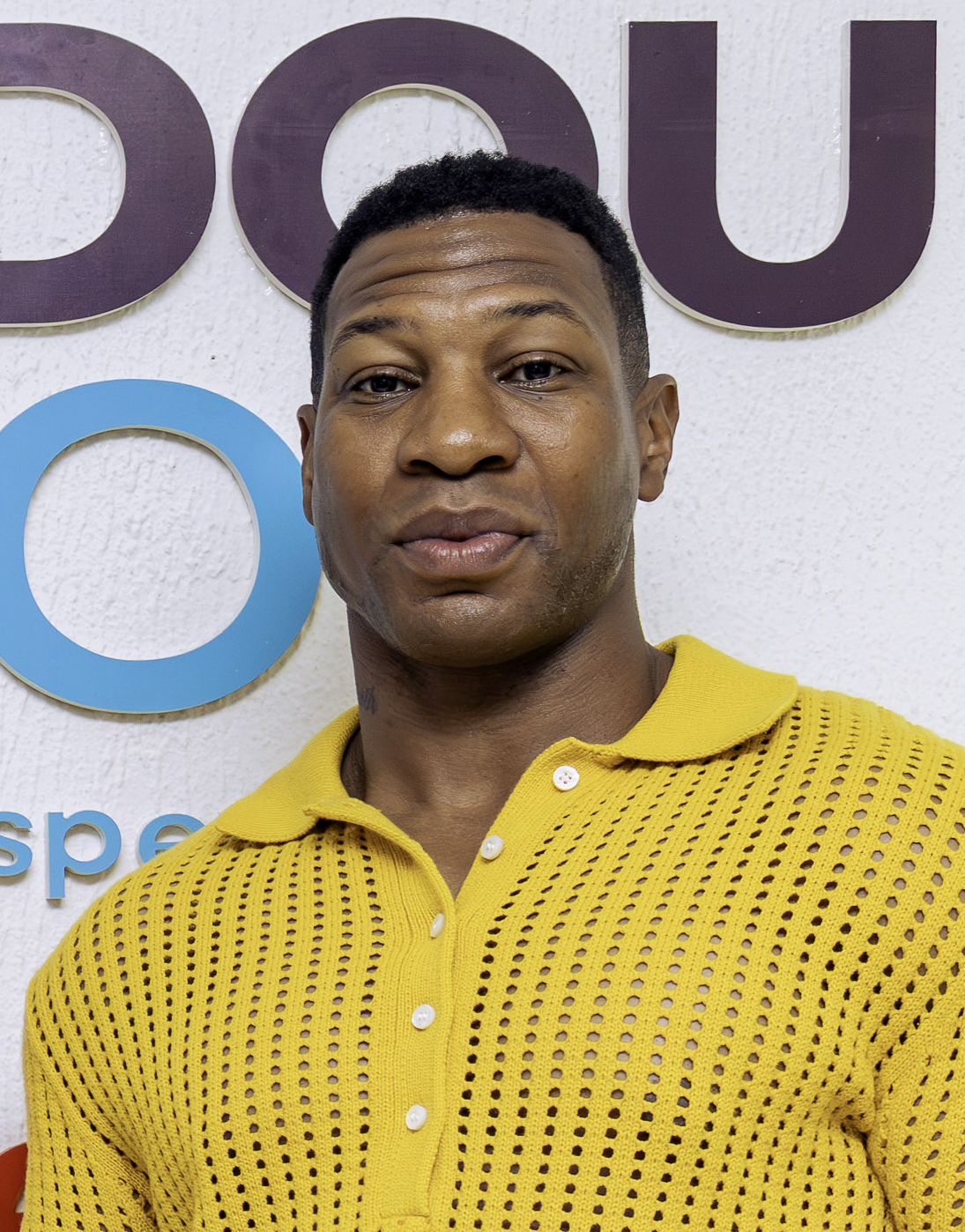
Majors in 2026

On December 18, 2023, following his harassment and assault conviction, Marvel Studios announced that they would be parting ways with Majors. He was originally set to appear in Avengers: The Kang Dynasty and Avengers: Secret Wars. Marvel met with actor Colman Domingo about potentially joining the MCU and replacing Majors as Kang, though Domingo declined, as he did not want to be cast as a replacement for another actor; he would eventually be cast as Norman Osborn in the animated series Your Friendly Neighborhood Spider-Man. The Kang Dynasty was reworked into Avengers: Doomsday, with the main antagonist changed to Doctor Doom, played by veteran MCU actor Robert Downey Jr. Majors was also dropped from a planned film about Dennis Rodman titled 48 Hours in Las Vegas.

On June 20, 2024, it was announced that Majors would star in an upcoming supernatural revenge thriller titled Merciless, to be directed by Martin Villeneuve, brother of Denis Villeneuve.

On June 21, 2024, Majors received the Perseverance Award which, per the Hollywood Unlocked Impact Awards, is "given to an individual who has shown that no matter what adversity they face, they will continue to aspire to inspire."

On May 6, 2025, it was announced that Majors would star as Vernon Threat in the action film True Threat, which is set to be directed and written by Gerald McMurray, who previously worked as a producer on the John Wick franchise. The film is also being produced by radio host/television personality Charlamagne tha God.

On October 26, 2025, it was announced that Majors and his wife, Meagan Good, were collaborating with mental health advocate Najah Elessie on a short film titled Wounds to Wisdom, designed to raise awareness about mental health within the Black community, particularly among Black men. The film premiered at the 2026 Martha's Vineyard African American Film Festival. Majors is also credited with writing the film's story.

On February 27, 2026, it was announced that Majors would star in an upcoming action film, directed by Kyle Rankin and produced by conservative influencer Ben Shapiro, for The Daily Wire. In March 2026, IATSE called a strike against the production over poor safety and labor conditions. Majors, who continued filming despite the strike, fell six feet out of a window, alongside his co-star, the latter of whom required stitches in his hand. The film, Run Hide Fight: Infidels, is a standalone sequel to 2020's Run Hide Fight and was released on September 16, 2026.

In October 2026, Majors appeared in the music video for Daniel Caesar's song "Violence", portraying an abusive father who delivers a monologue to his son about the Black experience, faith, and adversity.

== Personal life ==
=== Relationships ===
Majors has a daughter. In August 2021, he began a relationship with British dancer Grace Jabbari, whom he met in London on the set of the film Ant-Man and the Wasp: Quantumania. The pair separated in March 2023, following an incident in which Majors assaulted and harassed Jabbari.

In May 2023, Majors began dating actress Meagan Good. In November 2024, the couple announced their engagement at Ebony magazine's Power 100 event, where they first met in 2022. The pair married in March 2025. They acquired Guinean citizenship in 2026 after DNA testing traced their ancestry back to the country.

== Legal issues ==
=== 2023 assault ===
On March 25, 2023, Majors placed a 911 emergency call requesting medical assistance to his New York residence after he claimed he had arrived home and found his former girlfriend, Grace Jabbari, unresponsive. Majors also claimed he had spent the night at a hotel. Majors was later arrested on assault, strangulation and harassment charges, stemming from a domestic dispute the prior evening with Jabbari, who "sustained minor injuries to her head and neck and was removed to an area hospital in stable condition," according to the NYPD after their preliminary investigation. He was released from custody that day, and his spokesperson denied the allegations, saying Majors "has done nothing wrong ... We look forward to clearing his name and clearing this up." On March 26, Majors was arraigned in the New York City Criminal Court on the charges.

Majors's attorney, Priya Chaudhry, claimed that there were "two written statements from the woman recanting these allegations." On March 30, Chaudhry released text messages allegedly sent by Jabbari.

Jabbari was granted temporary order of protection by a judge against Majors ahead of a May 9, 2023 court date.

==== Reactions ====
In the initial wake of the incident, the United States Army announced they were suspending recruiting commercials that starred Majors. In a statement released to the public, the Army said, "while Mr. Majors is innocent until proven guilty, prudence dictates that we pull our ads until the investigation into these allegations is complete."

Several weeks after his arrest, Majors was dropped as a client by both the management company Entertainment 360 and the public relations firm The Lede Company. Majors was expected to star in and executive produce The Man in My Basement, an adaptation of the Walter Mosley novel of the same name, but was cut from the film and had his role recast. Additionally, Majors' invitation to the 2023 Met Gala was rescinded and he was removed from the Texas Rangers ad campaign.

On October 27, 2023, Disney removed Magazine Dreams, an upcoming film starring Majors, from its original release schedule of December 8, 2023 by Disney's subsidiary Searchlight Pictures. Following his eventual conviction, Marvel Studios dropped him from several roles, including Kang the Conqueror, and reworked Avengers: The Kang Dynasty into Avengers: Doomsday.

==== Trial and conviction ====
On November 29, 2023, the assault trial began, with Majors pleading not guilty to misdemeanor assault and harassment charges. On December 5, Jabbari provided testimony backing the prosecution's claim that Majors assaulted her and presented evidence to the court as well.

On December 11, 2023, Chloe Zoller, a stranger Jabbari met and later accompanied to a club after the alleged assault, testified that Jabbari looked "visibly upset" but did not appear to be injured. Audio was also released of Majors accusing Jabbari of being drunk, describing himself as a "great man", and suggesting that she act like Coretta Scott King or Michelle Obama. On December 13, the judge presiding over the case allowed key evidence to be released to the public including CCTV footage of the assault and Jabbari chasing Majors across several blocks in New York City. Closing arguments began on December 14.

On December 18, 2023, Majors was found guilty of one count of reckless assault in the third degree and a charge of harassment as a violation. He was acquitted on another charge of assault and one of aggravated harassment. His sentencing was set for February 6, 2024. Sentencing was postponed to April 8, 2024. In April 2024, he was sentenced to 52 weeks of a domestic violence intervention program and probation.

==== Other abuse allegations ====
In April 2023, Variety reported that more women accusing Majors of abuse had come forward and were cooperating with the Manhattan district attorney's office. The D.A. declined comment.

In June 2023, Rolling Stone published a report alleging a pattern of abusive behavior by Majors dating back to 2013, when he was studying at the Yale School of Drama. According to multiple third parties, Majors was physically and emotionally abusive toward one partner, while another described their relationship as "emotional torture". Majors' attorney denied the allegations, noting that the Rolling Stone report was effectively hearsay.

In February 2024, the two women who accused Majors of domestic abuse were identified.

==== Lawsuit ====
In March 2024, Jabbari sued Majors for defamation, assault and battery, alleging that Majors had a "pattern of pervasive domestic abuse that began in 2021 and extended through 2023". In November 2024, Jabbari and Majors reportedly settled the lawsuit.

== Filmography ==
=== Film ===
Year	Title	Role	Notes
2017	Hostiles	Corporal Henry Woodson	
2018	White Boy Rick	Johnny "Lil Man" Curry	
2018	Out of Blue	Duncan J. Reynolds	
2019	The Last Black Man in San Francisco	Montgomery Allen	
2019	Captive State	Rafe Drummond	
2019	Gully	Greg	
2019	Jungleland	Pepper	
2020	Da 5 Bloods	David	
2021	The Harder They Fall	Nat Love / Nathaniel Buck	
2022	Devotion	Jesse Brown	
2023	Magazine Dreams	Killian Maddox	Also executive producer
2023	Ant-Man and the Wasp: Quantumania	Kang the Conqueror	
2023	Creed III	Damian "Diamond Dame" Anderson	
2026	Wounds to Wisdom	Himself	Short film; also story writer
2026	Run Hide Fight: Infidels	Captain Clay Saunders	Also executive producer

=== Television ===
Year	Title	Role	Notes
2017	When We Rise	Young Ken Jones	4 episodes
2020	Lovecraft Country	Atticus Sampson "Tic" Freeman	Main role; 10 episodes
2021	Saturday Night Live	Himself	Host; episode: "Jonathan Majors/Taylor Swift"
2021–2023	Loki	He Who Remains / Time-Keepers (voice) / Victor Timely	Main role; 5 episodes
2021–2023	Marvel Studios: Assembled	Himself	Docuseries; 3 episodes

=== Music videos ===
Year	Title	Role	Notes
2026	"Violence"	Norwill Simmonds	Daniel Caesar

== Awards and nominations ==
Year	Award	Category	Work/Recipient(s)	Result	Ref.
2022	African-American Film Critics Association	Best Ensemble	The Harder They Fall	Won	
2025	America's Rainbow Film Festival	Best Actor in a Motion Picture	Magazine Dreams	Won	
2022	Austin Film Critics Association	Best Ensemble	The Harder They Fall	Nominated	
2020	Black Reel Awards	Outstanding Supporting Actor, Motion Picture	The Last Black Man in San Francisco	Nominated	
2020	Black Reel Awards	Outstanding Breakthrough Performance, Male	The Last Black Man in San Francisco	Nominated	
2021	Black Reel Awards	Outstanding Actor, Drama Series	Lovecraft Country	Won	
2022	Black Reel Awards	Outstanding Actor	The Harder They Fall	Nominated	
2022	Black Reel Awards	Outstanding Guest Actor, Drama Series	Loki	Nominated	
2024	Black Reel Awards	Outstanding Supporting Performance	Creed III	Nominated	
2026	Black Reel Awards	Outstanding Lead Performance	Magazine Dreams	Nominated	
2021	Celebration of Black Cinema and Television	Ensemble Award	The Harder They Fall	Won	
2021	Critics' Choice Awards	Best Acting Ensemble	Da 5 Bloods	Nominated	
2021	Critics' Choice Awards	Best Actor in a Drama Series	Lovecraft Country	Nominated	
2022	Critics' Choice Awards	Best Acting Ensemble	The Harder They Fall	Nominated	
2021	Critics' Choice Super Awards	Best Actor in a Horror Series	Lovecraft Country	Nominated	
2022	Critics' Choice Super Awards	Best Actor in an Action Movie	The Harder They Fall	Nominated	
2021	Detroit Film Critics Society	Best Ensemble	The Harder They Fall	Nominated	
2019	Gotham Awards	Breakthrough Actor	The Last Black Man in San Francisco	Nominated	
2021	Gotham Awards	Ensemble Tribute Award	The Harder They Fall	Won	
2021	Hollywood Critics Association Awards	Best Cast Ensemble	Da 5 Bloods	Won	
2024	Hollywood Unlocked Impact Awards	Perseverance Award	Himself	Won	
2022	Houston Film Critics Society	Best Cast Ensemble	The Harder They Fall	Nominated	
2020	Independent Spirit Awards	Best Supporting Male	The Last Black Man in San Francisco	Nominated	
2019	Los Angeles Film Critics Association	New Generation Award	Himself	Won	
2021	NAACP Image Awards	Outstanding Actor in a Drama Series	Lovecraft Country	Nominated	
2021	NAACP Image Awards	Outstanding Ensemble Cast in a Motion Picture	Da 5 Bloods	Nominated	
2022	NAACP Image Awards	Outstanding Actor in a Motion Picture	The Harder They Fall	Nominated	
2022	NAACP Image Awards	Outstanding Ensemble Cast in a Motion Picture	The Harder They Fall	Won	
2021	National Board of Review Awards	Best Cast	The Harder They Fall	Won	
2022	Newport Beach Film Festival	Artist of Distinction Award	Himself	Won	
2021	Primetime Emmy Awards	Outstanding Lead Actor in a Drama Series	Lovecraft Country	Nominated	
2022	San Diego Film Critics Society	Best Performance by an Ensemble	The Harder They Fall	Nominated	
2021	Saturn Awards	Best Actor on Television	Lovecraft Country	Nominated	
2022	Saturn Awards	Best Guest Starring Role on Television	Loki	Nominated	
2021	Screen Actors Guild Awards	Outstanding Cast in a Motion Picture	Da 5 Bloods	Nominated	
2021	Screen Actors Guild Awards	Outstanding Ensemble in a Drama Series	Lovecraft Country	Nominated	
2025	Septimius Awards	Best American Actor	Magazine Dreams	Won	
2021	Washington D.C. Area Film Critics Association	Best Ensemble	The Harder They Fall	Nominated	
