= Steel and Lace =

- VHS cover art
- Directed by: Ernest D. Farino
- Written by: Joseph Dougherty; Dave Edison
- Produced by: David DeCoteau; John Schouweiler; Charles W. Fries (executive producer)
- Starring: Clare Wren; Bruce Davison; Stacy Haiduk; David Naughton; Michael Cerveris
- Cinematography: Thomas M. Callaway
- Edited by: Christopher Roth
- Music by: John Massari
- Distributed by: Fries Entertainment
- Release date: January 30, 1991
- Running time: 90 minutes
- Country: United States
- Language: English

Steel and Lace is a 1991 science fiction action film directed by Ernest D. Farino and starring Clare Wren, Bruce Davison, Stacy Haiduk, David Naughton, and Michael Cerveris.

== Plot ==
Gaily Morton, a classical concert pianist, is raped by businessman Daniel Emerson. Her brother Albert takes time off from his career as a robot scientist to represent his sister at the criminal trial. However Daniel has gotten several of his friends to provide an alibi for the night of the rape, and he is found not guilty. Gaily is horrified by the verdict and commits suicide by jumping off the court building, despite her brother's pleas.

Albert uses his knowledge of robotics to resurrect his sister as a cyborg, which he then sends after Daniel and his business partners – the men who provided false witness in court.

== Cast ==
- Clare Wren as Gaily Morton
- Bruce Davison as Albert Morton
- Stacy Haiduk as Alison
- David Naughton as Detective Dunn
- Michael Cerveris as Daniel Emerson
- Scott Burkholder as Tobby
- Paul Lieber as Oscar
- Brian Backer as Norman
- John J. York as Craig
- Nick Tate as Duncan
- David L. Lander as Schumann
- Beverly Mickins as Trips
- John DeMita as Agent Spoon
- Cindy Brooks as Girl in T-Bird
- William Prince as Old Man

== Reception ==
On Rotten Tomatoes there are 2 reviews listed, both are negative.
