= Kyle Rankin =

American film director

- Born: September 13, 1972 (age 54); Danbury, Connecticut, U.S.
- Education: University of Maine
- Occupations: Screenwriter, director
- Known for: The Battle of Shaker Heights; Infestation; Night of the Living Deb; Run Hide Fight
- Children: 3

Kyle Rankin (born September 13, 1972) is an American screenwriter and filmmaker known for directing The Battle of Shaker Heights and Night of the Living Deb. In 2020, his film Run Hide Fight, about a school shooting, was shown at the Venice Film Festival. Rankin also directed its standalone sequel, Run Hide Fight: Infidels.

== Early life and education ==
Rankin was born in Danbury, Connecticut and attended the University of Maine, where he was the president of the student video club, and was a winner at the Maine Student Film and Video Festival. As a college student, Rankin was the star and co-producer, along with Efram Potelle, of a movie called Dorm. The film was originally intended to be a serial for campus TV, but ended up being a campus-murder mystery. The pair convinced their friends to appear in the film, and received donations from campus organizations, which they used to rent out empty dorm rooms as a set. The film took 3½ months to make, and was shown in Maine theaters, and was available to rent from video stores in Maine.

== Career ==
Rankin co-directed The Battle of Shaker Heights through the second season of HBO's Project Greenlight. He wrote and directed a movie produced by Icon Productions, called Infestation, starring Chris Marquette, Ray Wise, Brooke Nevin; it was shot in the summer of 2007 in Bulgaria. He created the feature/web-series Nuclear Family, and the indie features Night of the Living Deb and The Witch Files.

Run Hide Fight was filmed in Red Oak, Texas in the fall of 2019 and stars Isabel May, Thomas Jane, and Radha Mitchell. The film was screened at the Venice Film Festival in 2020. The Daily Wire acquired North American rights to the film and it premiered on their subscription platform on January 14, 2021.

In February 2026, it was reported that Rankin reteamed with The Daily Wire to direct an action thriller produced by Bonfire Legend and starring Jonathan Majors. The film is reportedly a standalone sequel to Run Hide Fight titled Run Hide Fight: Infidels. However, production was reportedly plagued with several injuries, labor issues, and accidents, with several crew members lobbying to unionize.

== Personal life ==
As of 2020, Rankin lives in Encino, California with his wife and daughters.

== Filmography ==
- Run Hide Fight: Infidels (2026)
- The Roughneck (2024)
- Run Hide Fight (2021)
- The Witch Files (2017)
- Night of the Living Deb (2015)
- Nuclear Family (2011)
- Exhibit B-5 (2010)
- Infestation (2009)
- Hellholes (Internet film) (2006)
- Insex (short film) (2006)
- The Battle of Shaker Heights (2003)
- Alias: The Lost Episode (2002)
- They Came to Attack Us (2001)
- Pennyweight (1999)
- The Girl in the Basement (1997) (Formerly known as "Reindeer Games")
- Dorm (1995)
