= Bride Has Massive Hair Wig Out =

Viral YouTube video

Jodi Behan as the bride "wigging out".

Bride Has Massive Hair Wig Out is the name of a viral video uploaded to YouTube in early 2007. The campaign was created by Canadian Advertising Agency, Capital C. Seemingly shot by one of three bridesmaids, it shows a bride (Canadian actress Jodi Behan) so unhappy with her hairstyle on her wedding day that she starts cutting it off.

It quickly became popular and widely linked to. Viewers, and eventually the news media, began debating whether it was real or staged. Two weeks later, after the clip had been viewed 2.8 million times, it was revealed to have been part of a campaign created by marketing firm Capital C, for Unilever for its Sunsilk brand of hair care products, and removed. It featured actor/writer Ingrid Haas who was hired as the writer and bridesmaid along with Jessie Behan (who plays the most attentive bridesmaid) and John Griffith directed and videographed it.

== Synopsis ==
The six-minute clip begins with three bridesmaids killing time in a hotel room while awaiting Jodi, the bride, who they note is running a little late. They joke around and open a bottle of champagne. Two are seen, identified as "Jessie" and "Esther"; the camcorder operator is never seen nor named.

Jodi arrives, slams the door and falls to the floor crying about her hair. The other women try to console her. She seems to calm down. They urge her to start getting her dress on. However, once she sees herself in the mirror she returns to her disappointment with her hair. After a skip where the camera is turned off, Jessie offers Jodi some champagne and reassures her things will work out. But the bride is still not convinced. After another break, the camera shows her cutting her hair.

When she sees herself in the mirror, Jodi starts to cry again, and starts blaming Jessie for "letting her cut her hair". Esther and the camerawoman are amused; Jessie tries to make the best of the situation. After another cut, Jessie is trying to cut more of Jodi's braids off as all three bridesmaids try again to reassure her. Finally she sees the camera again and lunges toward it.

== Cast ==
- Jodi Behan as Jodi, a bride-to-be extremely unhappy with her hairstyle
- Jessie Behan as Jessie, her older sister and the most helpful bridesmaid of the three.
- Esther Orosz as Esther, another bridesmaid who mostly stands aside trying to keep a straight face and drinking champagne.
- Ingrid Haas as The camera operator/ bridesmaid, never seen.

== Production ==
Toronto advertising agency Capital C hired John Griffith, a director with production company, Burnout, to direct their video. He saw Haas and Jessie Behan in a play and liked their acting enough to give them the roles. Jodi Behan and Orosz were brought in later.

It was later filmed at the Four Points by Sheraton in a single take. Jodi got the starring role because she was the only one of the four willing to cut off her own hair. It was uploaded shortly afterwards. The four were signed to a confidentiality agreement and could not reveal their roles in the video.

== Reception ==
The clip was uploaded to YouTube by "wigoutgirl" on January 18, 2007. It almost immediately received many favorites and views. Soon it was among the featured videos on the site's main page. Eventually, that one copy would be viewed almost 2.8 million times (and overall, all copies viewed 12 million times).

Griffith estimated that the first two million viewers watched because they thought it was real and the second two million wanted to see if it was a fake. "It didn't matter to us whether people believed it or didn't believe it - just as long as they were watching it, sharing it with their friends and talking about it," he says.

=== Debate on authenticity ===
Some commenters suspected the clip was fake, noting that the camera operator never stops and helps out and that Jodi's hair seemed to be a wig, even though Behan actually did cut her own hair. Others felt it was authentic because Jodi's button-down shirt was consistent with what a bride would wear after having her hair done so as to avoid ruining the style by taking a top off over the hair.

Canadian media were particularly interested since the clip was believed to have originated in that country. The Toronto Star even got legendary film director Norman Jewison to review the clip. He was suspicious, believing the hair to be a wig, but admitted he couldn't say for sure and that if it was, the woman playing the bride had a future in acting.

=== Other responses ===
Some YouTubers recorded responses, either urging Jodi to calm down or expressing sympathy for her, since one of her worst moments had just been broadcast for the entire world to see by someone she should have considered a friend. Others parodied the video, usually showing men in a similar situation.

== Origins revealed ==
As the month ended, Toronto-area gossip columns and websites began receiving tips that "Jodi" was local actress Jodi Behan. The next day Behan, her sister Jessie and another actress, Esther Orosz, revealed themselves as the characters and admitted it was all staged in a round of media appearances in both the U.S. and Canada (when the quartet appeared on Good Morning America, Jodi had a paper bag over her face until it was unveiled). They hoped it would help their acting careers.

Along with them was Haas, who explained that the whole film had been shot to promote Unilever's Sunsilk brand of hair care products. Originally several more had been planned, but the success of the first one had led the company to move right into an ad campaign that would play on the phrase "wig out" and offer solutions, its executives said. Later, industry observers questioned the effectiveness of the campaign in promoting the Sunsilk brand because it received little attention compared to the video.
