= Infestation (film) =

- Theatrical release poster
- Directed by: Kyle Rankin
- Written by: Kyle Rankin
- Produced by: Jeff Balis; Bruce Davey
- Starring: Chris Marquette; E. Quincy Sloan; Brooke Nevin; Kinsey Packard; Deborah Geffner; Ray Wise
- Cinematography: Thomas E. Ackerman
- Edited by: David Finfer
- Music by: Steven Gutheinz
- Production company: Heavy Duty Entertainment
- Distributed by: Icon Productions
- Release date: November 21, 2009
- Running time: 91 minutes
- Country: United States
- Language: English

Infestation is a 2009 American comedy horror film written and directed by Kyle Rankin. It was produced by Mel Gibson's Icon Entertainment and starring Chris Marquette, E. Quincy Sloan, Brooke Nevin, Kinsey Packard, Deborah Geffner and Ray Wise. It was filmed in Bulgaria.

== Plot ==
Cooper is a slacker who works as a telemarketer. Arriving late for work, he is promptly fired by his boss, Maureen, for always turning up late, driving customers away, and fooling around in the office. Shortly after, an extremely loud sound is heard and Cooper faints with a pained expression on his face.

Cooper wakes up a few days later, nauseated, weak and cocooned in his office. As he struggles out of the cocoon, he is attacked by a giant, beetle-like bug. He fights the bug away and helps Maureen out of a cocoon. Maureen regains consciousness and realizes that her daughter, Sara, was waiting for her outside the office. They go outside to check on Sara, who is unconscious and trapped inside a cocoon in her car. As Cooper is helping Sara out of the cocoon, Maureen is attacked and captured by a large, wasp-like creature. Other bugs surround them, but they use Sara's car alarm to distract them and escape to a restaurant.

They find and revive Cindy, Hugo, Hugo's father Albert, Leechee, Roger, PJ and a cop. PJ and Roger decide to escape in Roger's truck against the advice of others and are attacked by the bugs. In the chaos, PJ, Roger and the cop are killed, Albert is stung by a bug and Cooper saves Cindy from being crushed by Roger's runaway truck.

The group makes their way to the roof of a nearby building and see a group of wasps flying towards them, discovering that the bugs are blind and use sound to track their victims when the wasps do not attack them. They use a radio to lure a bug into a storage closet and milk it to identify the contents of its venom. Leechee analyses the venom and discovers that it contains sedatives and some proteins. The group decides to go to the nearest military airbase for help. They also see the bug hive, which is emitting red colored gas. The group sets off the next day, but Leechee decides to stay behind to help revive more people and study the bugs.

Arriving at Hugo's house, the group find Albert's wife, who seems to have died of natural causes. They move on to Cindy's brother, Chad's house next, where Cindy finds her sister-in-law Susan cocooned and revives her. They also find Chad, who has mutated into a large spider-like creature that is collecting cocooned humans. He attacks the group, killing Susan, knocking out Sara and impaling Cooper when he tries to save Cindy before he is finally killed by Hugo and Albert.

They camp for the night at Chad's house and Sara patches Cooper up. Cindy wants Cooper to ditch the group and come with her, but Cooper is in love with Sara and turns down the offer. The next day, they decide to go to Cooper's dad, Ethan's house since Ethan is a military veteran who has weapons and a bunker at his house. Sara informs Cooper that she intends to go to the bug hive to find her mother. Cooper tries to convince her to come with him, but she refuses. They come across a few flying bugs and hide under a bridge, but Cindy sees Cooper and Sara holding hands, becomes furious, and shouts to attract the bugs towards the group. Albert shoots Cindy to save the group, but Sara is captured by the bugs. The group continues on and reaches Ethan's house, where Albert turns into a mutant, similar to Chad. Hugo shoots his father to save the group.

Cooper tries to convince Ethan to help him save Sara, but he refuses and Cooper leaves Ethan and Hugo behind, only to be captured by another group who lock him up in a cell at an abandoned police station. There, he meets a Puerto Rican man, who tells him that he was part of Leechee's group and that the others presumably died in an explosion caused by the flammable red colored gas released by the nest. Hugo and Ethan are captured by the same group, and it is revealed that Ethan has been stung by a wasp. The Puerto Rican man turns into a mutant, and Ethan uses the distraction to kill the enemy group and save Cooper and Hugo.

Meanwhile, Sara wakes up in the bug hive and comes across the queen consuming cocooned humans. Ethan, Hugo and Cooper reach the hive, where Ethan handcuffs Cooper to a tree and hits Hugo on the head. He leaves the keys so that Cooper and Hugo can escape before he enters the hive alone. Inside, he comes across Sara, who offers to take him to the queen. They are then attacked by the queen, but Hugo and Cooper arrive in time to help. The group attack the queen with their weapons, but this only angers the queen, who begins to wail loudly. As the group cowers in pain, Hugo, unable to hear the wail as he had lost his hearing, throws the explosives into the queen’s mouth. Ethan then orders Sara, Cooper and Hugo to escape from the bug hive while he triggers the explosives, but he turns into a mutant. Cooper takes the remote from his father and triggers the explosives, obliterating the nest and the insects inside.

The film ends with Cooper, Sara and Hugo turning towards the sound of a large rumbling.

== Cast ==
- Chris Marquette as Cooper
- Brooke Nevin as Sara
- E. Quincy Sloan as Hugo
- Kinsey Packard as Cindy
- Wesley Thompson as Albert
- Linda Park as Leechee
- Deborah Geffner as Maureen
- Ray Wise as Ethan
- Todd Jenson as Skinny Cop
- Bru Muller as Roger
- Vlado Mihailov as PJ
- Mike Straub as Chad
- Daniela Tonova as Susan

== Possible sequel ==
Director Kyle Rankin and lead actor Chris Marquette, signed 3-picture contracts with Icon Films for a potential trilogy of this storyline.
