= Clare Wren =

American actress (born 1962)

- Born: Helen Claire Wren; May 4, 1962 (age 63); New Orleans, Louisiana, U.S.
- Occupation: Actress
- Years active: 1986–2005

Clare Wren (as Helen Claire Wren) is an American actress. She is best known as Rachel Dunn on The Young Riders.

== Life and career ==
Born in New Orleans, Louisiana, and raised in Texarkana, Arkansas. Her father is a doctor and her mother is a pianist with two sisters, Nancy and Roberta Atkinson.

As a youth, she participated extensively in gymnastic competitions, training at the Olympia Training Center in Louisiana, but she injured her knee in a competition during her senior year of high school, and was propelled to seek alternatives for her future. That fall, she was accepted at Southern Methodist University in Dallas, Texas where she spent her first year on crutches, recovering from extensive knee surgery. While at Southern Methodist University, she became heavily involved in theater, and ended up graduating from the Professional Acting Program along with a degree in psychology. After graduating from college, she moved to Los Angeles to further pursue her acting career.

== Filmography ==
Films

- Extremities (1986)
- No Man's Land (1987)
- Season of Fear (1989)
- Steel and Lace (1991)
- Midnight Edition (1993)
- Lunker Lake (1997)

Television

- Who's the Boss? Episode:Welcome Wagon Lady (1987)
- Jake and the Fatman (1987)
- Hunter (1989)
- Mancuso, F.B.I. Episode:Suspicious Minds (1989)
- In the Heat of the Night (1989)
- Joe Bob's Drive-In Theater (1991)
- The Young Riders (1990 - 1992)
- Civil Wars (1993)
- Jack's Place (1993)
- The Adventures of Brisco County, Jr. (1994)
- Pointman Episode:Treasure Hunt (1995)
- Law & Order Season 6 Episode:Humiliation (1995)
- ER Season 3 Episode:Post Mortem (1997)
- Soul Man (1998)
- Nash Bridges Season 5 Episode:Smash and Grab (1999)
- NYPD Blue (2004)
- JAG (2005)
