= Michael Stasko =

- Born: Michael John Stasko; May 29, 1980 (age 46); Windsor, Ontario

Michael John Stasko (born May 29, 1980) is a Canadian actor, film producer, film writer, film composer, film director and film editor.

== Biography ==
Stasko graduated from the University of Windsor in Communication Studies with a concentration in Film, and later completed postgraduate studies at Sheridan College in Advanced Television and Film. He went on to complete an MFA in Film at Columbia University. His film credits include Things To Do (2006), Iodine (2009), and The Birder (2013). He is currently a professor of Communication and Film studies at the University of Windsor.
