= Night of the Living Deb =

- Directed by: Kyle Rankin
- Written by: Andy Selsor
- Produced by: Michael Cassidy; Kyle Rankin; Chad Nicholson
- Starring: Maria Thayer; Michael Cassidy; Ray Wise; Chris Marquette; Syd Wilder
- Cinematography: Thomas E. Ackerman
- Edited by: Tony Copolillo
- Music by: Steven Gutheinz
- Distributed by: CockSure Entertainment
- Release date: August 29, 2015
- Running time: 84 minutes
- Country: United States
- Language: English
- Budget: $106,000

Night of the Living Deb is a 2015 American romantic zombie comedy film directed by Kyle Rankin. It stars Maria Thayer, Michael Cassidy, Ray Wise and Chris Marquette. Thayer plays an awkward woman who, after a one-night stand, realizes she has awoken to a zombie apocalypse.

== Plot ==
At a bar, Deb Clarington, a camera operator for the local news, sees an attractive man, Ryan Waverly. Although she is initially too insecure to approach him, her friend Ruby talks her into it. While awkwardly hitting on him, Deb is interrupted by Ryan's fiancé, who breaks up with him when he refuses to accept a high-paying job at his father's company. The next thing Deb knows, she wakes in Ryan's bed with a hangover. Ryan asks her to leave and after several attempts to seduce him, she reluctantly agrees but sees people attack and cannibalize each other. Deb saves Ryan from a zombie attack, and they return to his apartment.

Deb once again attempts to seduce Ryan, who is more concerned with checking on his family and ex-fiancée. Since he has no car, Deb agrees to help him. They first visit his elderly neighbor for supplies. Finding her apparently dead, they bicker over arrangements, only to be surprised when she rises as a zombie. After they kill her, Deb drops the supplies, alerting many zombies. The two flee to her car, agreeing that they will not stop until they reach Ryan's family. Along the way, Deb eagerly rams several zombies; Ryan objects, saying they may be treatable. Although skeptical of his idealism, Deb agrees not to unnecessarily kill them.

Despite their earlier agreement, Deb takes a detour to visit Ruby, who is now a zombie. Convinced the zombies may be treatable, Deb traps Ruby in the car's trunk. At Ryan's father's mansion, the two meet Chaz, Ryan's brother, who quizzes them on whether they are zombies before allowing them in. Ryan is reunited with Stacy and Ryan's father, Frank, reveals that his water treatment plant spread the zombie virus to the town. When Deb pushes for more information, he blames the governor for pushing an environmentally dangerous project, to Ryan's disgust.

Frank privately tells Ryan the governor has arranged a helicopter for them and Ryan insists they take Deb. Frank refuses, but relents when Ryan threatens to stay behind. Frank tries to drug Deb so they can abandon her, but she hands the drugged food to their security guard. When Ryan tells Stacy he no longer wants to marry her, she loudly simulates having sex, driving Deb to leave the house and Chaz to become intensely jealous. After their guard dies, zombies attack Stacy. Chaz ignores her pleas for help and, dazed by seeing her eaten alive, allows himself to be bitten. The Waverlys leave the house for the helicopter, taking Chaz with them.

Deb discovers a security checkpoint at the town limits. Satisfying the paramilitary group, they allow her to leave but say she must turn back to the town. After she invokes Frank's name to the governor, Frank appears, demanding his helicopter transportation. The governor explains there never was a helicopter, and he wants only to clean up loose ends. Ryan tells the Governor that Deb is a reporter who has evidence on him hidden in her car's trunk; the governor opens the trunk and is killed by Ruby. When Frank is also bitten, he tells Ryan and Deb to flee while he holds off the soldiers.

Deb realizes they can use her television station to send out a broadcast that can not be jammed. After she proclaims her love for Ryan on-air, she is bitten. Believing herself to be turning into a zombie, she asks Ryan to leave her behind and wait for help, but he refuses to abandon her, instead offering himself to her as zombie food. Before she can bite him, paramedics break into the station and reveal the virus is not contagious. Frank and Chaz, revealed to have also survived although under arrest, encourage Ryan to proclaim his love to Deb. As fighter jets bomb the city, Deb and Ryan kiss.

== Cast ==
- Maria Thayer as Deb Clarington
- Michael Cassidy as Ryan Waverly
- Ray Wise as Frank Waverly
- Chris Marquette as Chaz Waverly
- Syd Wilder as Stacy
- Brian Sacca as Colonel Newton
- Julie Brister as Ruby

== History ==
=== Production ===
On March 6, 2014, Kyle Rankin and Michael Cassidy revealed via Kickstarter that they were producing a "Zom-Rom-Com". They gave fans a tease with a pledge video to demonstrate how the film could be; plus to give fans another tease, they released the first 16 pages of the script online, so they knew what they were investing in. The fans were given 30 days to raise $99,000 – but by April 5, 2014, they had raised over $100,000.

=== Filming ===
Portland, Maine was chosen for filming since it was Kyle's hometown. Principal photography commenced on June 10, 2014, and ended on July 3, 2014. The cast and crew publicly promoted a wrap party that anyone could attend, with purchase of a $95 ticket, which was held on July 3, 2014.

== Reception ==
Rotten Tomatoes, a review aggregator, reports that 88% of eight surveyed critics from gave the film a positive review; the average rating is 6.64/10.

Jennie Kermode, writing for Eye for Film wrote that the film "feels like it was made by a soap opera producer for daytime TV, and even dedicated fans of the shuffling undead will struggle to swallow it.".
