= Ingrid Haas =

American political scientist

Ingrid Johnsen Haas is an American political scientist at the University of Nebraska-Lincoln. She is an expert on political behavior, social psychology, and cognitive neurosciences. She researches the effect of emotions and identity on the expression of political attitudes.

== Education ==
In 2005, Haas earned a B.A. in psychology and political science from the University of St.Thomas in Minnesota. She earned an M.A in 2008 and a Ph.D. in social psychology in 2012 from the Ohio State University.

== Career ==
Haas is currently the Graduate Program chair and Associate Professor of Political Science at the University of Nebraska Lincoln. She also serves as the Resident Faculty in the Center for Brain, Biology, and Behavior, where she is director of the Political Attitudes and Cognition Lab and Faculty Coordinator of the Political Science Experimental Participant Pool (PSEPP). She is also affiliated with the Department of Psychology. As of May 2022, Haas has been appointed as a Faculty Fellow with the UNL National Strategic Institute (NSRI), and received a grant with fellow academic Rupal Mehta to study the neuroscience behind nuclear decision making, for a proposal titled, “Ideology and Risk: How Neuroscience can Inform Nuclear Security.” Haas has also been named a Faculty Fellow of the Nebraska Governance and Technology Center for 2022-2023.

== Research ==
Haas' primary interests include the determinants of individual attitudes and beliefs; emotion, mood, and affect; and ethics and morality and its implications for social cognition, political psychology, and prejudice and stereotyping. Haas uses functional MRI (fMRI) and survey data collection to explore how the political attitudes and beliefs of people are structured with respect to social and political stimuli. The lab uses theories and methods from political and social psychology along with cognitive neuroscience to conduct its research.

A 2020 article from Scientific American titled, "Conservative and Liberal Brains Might Have Some Real Differences," summarizes one of Haas' findings, as follows:

"In a 2017 study with her colleagues, Haas created hypothetical candidates, each belonging to the Democratic or Republican party with an assigned stances on policy issues. Some of the assigned positions were “expected” based on the candidate’s party affiliation whereas others were unexpected. The research sought to understand how political information is processed and found that when posed with the unexpected takes from candidates, liberals proved to be more attentive, taking longer to decide their stance on the information."
