= Standalone film =

Film not dependent on any other file for plot devices

A standalone film is a film whose story that does not have any relation with other films but happens in the same universe. In the late 1990s, it was typical to create standalone films with no plans for sequels. The term "standalone film" appeared when prequels, sequels, spin-offs, and franchises became normal from the mid-2000s onwards.

== Types of standalone films ==
In a canonical meaning, a standalone film is a film that is not part of any franchise. The Sixth Sense, The Shawshank Redemption, Inception, Se7en and Interstellar are examples of standalone films.

When a film is set in either the same universe (or one very similar to that of) as its predecessors, yet has very little if any narrative connection to its predecessors and can be appreciated on its own without a thorough understanding of the backstory, then the work can be referred to as a standalone sequel. Mr. Bean's Holiday and Big Top Pee-wee are examples of standalone sequels.

A standalone spin-off is a film that expands some fictional universe. The Star Wars Anthology series is an example of standalone spin-offs. Standalone spin-offs may also be centered on a minor character from an existing fictional universe.

== See also ==
- Sequel
- Spin-off
