= Efram Potelle =

American film director

Efram Potelle is a filmmaker from Portland, Maine. He is now based in Los Angeles.

He co-directed The Battle of Shaker Heights through the second season of HBO's Project Greenlight.

== Filmography ==
- Endangered (2026)
- Hellholes (2007)
- Insex (2006)
- Case Tape 347 (2005)
- The Battle of Shaker Heights (2003)
- Alias: The Lost Episode (2002)
- They Came to Attack Us (2001)
- Pennyweight (1999)
- The Girl in the Basement (1997) (formerly Reindeer Games)
- Dorm (1994)
