= Visionary =

One who can envision the future

A visionary, defined broadly, is one who can envision the future. For some groups, visioning can involve the supernatural.

Though visionaries may face accusations of hallucinating, people may succeed in reaching a visionary state via meditation, lucid dreams, daydreams, or art. One example of a visionary is Hildegard of Bingen, a 12th-century artist and Catholic saint. Other visionaries in religion include St Bernadette (1844-1879) and Joseph Smith (1805-1844), said to have had visions of and to have communed with the Blessed Virgin and the Angel Moroni, respectively. There is also the case of the Targum Jonathan, which was produced in antiquity and served as the targum to the Nevi'im. It described the significance of the turban or a diadem to indicate a capability on the part of Jewish priests to become agents of visionary experience.

Robert Jarvik has suggested: "Leaders are visionaries with a poorly developed sense of fear and no concept of the odds against them."

== Extended meanings ==
A vision can be political, religious, environmental, social, or technological in nature. By extension, a visionary can also be a person with a clear, distinctive, and specific (in some details) vision of the future, usually connected with advances in technology or social/political arrangements. For example, Ted Nelson is referred to as a visionary in connection with the Internet.

Other visionaries simply imagine what does not yet exist but might someday, as some forms of "visioning" (or gazing) provide a glimpse into the possible future. Therefore, visioning can mean seeing in a utopian way what does not yet exist on earth—but might exist in another realm—such as the ideal or perfect realm as imagined or thought. Examples are Buckminster Fuller in architecture and design, Malcolm Bricklin in the automobile industry and Ada Lovelace in computing. Some people use mathematics to make visionary discoveries in the nature of the universe. In that sense, a visionary may also function as a secular prophet. Some visionaries emphasize communication, and some assume a figurehead role in organizing a social group. In other words, a visionary means that a person can see what something could be long before it actually happens.

== In business ==
The ability to get a clear picture of the future is the reason the concept is also used in the business field to denote a leader who is able to anticipate future opportunities. For instance, there is the case of the American entrepreneur Steve Jobs who is often called a visionary because he was ahead of his time, implementing new ideas that are pioneering in the technology field. Management experts do not equate this as an uncanny ability to predict the future but a capability of viewing the world differently, which allows an individual to identify patterns, trends, and opportunities. Some conceive it as the ability to form a picture of what they want of the future and make it happen.

There are authors who consider the concept of the visionary as one that is constituted by a set of acquired skills and, thus, a state that can be learned. For this reason, there are now training and educational programs that promise its learners that they can become visionary leaders. This is demonstrated by a growing body of literature that cites techniques, which can be obtained from courses in visionary thinking, for a person to reach beyond illusory boundaries.

== In art ==
Artists may produce work loosely categorized as visionary art for its luminous content and/or for its use of artistic techniques that call for the use of extended powers of perception in the viewer: (e.g. Gustave Moreau, Samuel Palmer, Jean Delville, Ernst Fuchs, the French Symbolist Odilon Redon, Brion Gysin, Max Ernst, Stanley Spencer, Edward Burne-Jones, Adolf Wolfli, Fred Sandback, William Blake, Hieronymus Bosch, and Henry Darger).

Visionary art can be incorrectly defined as a category of primitive art (art of those not formally trained) rather than describing people who have used their visions (or dreams) to create their paintings. Salvador Dalí is one artist who would exemplify visionary art that is neither religious nor primitive.

== In media ==
- The Final Destination franchise centers on the main characters who receive sudden and detailed premonitions of large-scale disasters before they happen. These visions allow them to escape death temporarily, only to realize that Death continues to pursue them afterward. Alex Browning from Final Destination is a high school senior who has a vision of his plane exploding in midair. Kimberly Corman from Final Destination 2 is a college student who foresees a deadly highway pile-up. Wendy Christensen from Final Destination 3 is a recent high school graduate who has a premonition of a roller coaster derailment. Nick O'Bannon from The Final Destination is a college student who envisions a fatal racetrack accident. Sam Lawton from Final Destination 5 is an office worker who foresees a suspension bridge collapsing in high winds. Iris Campbell from Final Destination Bloodlines is the grandmother of Stefani Reyes who has a premonition of the Sky View Tower collapsing during the 1960s.
- Raven Baxter from That's So Raven and Raven's Home is a high school student who has a secret psychic ability that allows her to experience short visions of future events.
- Booker Baxter-Carter from Raven's Home is Raven's son, who has inherited his mother's psychic abilities.
- Wednesday Addams from Wednesday is a student at Nevermore Academy who attempts to master her emerging psychic ability.

== See also ==
- List of 3D modeling software
- List of digital art software
