= Wendy Christensen =

Final Destination character

- Final Destination character
- Mary Elizabeth Winstead as Wendy Christensen
- First appearance: Final Destination 3
- Last appearance: Final Destination 5 (archive footage)
- Created by: Glen Morgan; James Wong
- Portrayed by: Mary Elizabeth Winstead

In-universe information
- Occupation: Former high school student (graduated)
- Family: Julie Christensen (younger sister)
- Significant others: Jason Wise (partner; deceased); Kevin Fischer (sexual; only novelization)
- Home: McKinley, Pennsylvania

Wendy Christensen is a fictional character in the Final Destination franchise. The character, created by James Wong and Glen Morgan, and portrayed by actress Mary Elizabeth Winstead, serves as the protagonist in Final Destination 3. Outside of the films, the character also appears in the novelization of Final Destination 3.

In the film, Wendy is depicted a high school graduate from the fictional town of McKinley in Pennsylvania, and is one of the survivors of the Devil's Flight roller coaster derailment. The character is portrayed in the film as an emotional "control freak" who becomes increasingly distressed over the course of the film as she fails to save the lives of those around her.

Both the character and Winstead's performance were positively received by critics, often being singled out as one of the highlights of the film, even by its detractors. Wendy's ultimate fate at the end of the film was ambiguous and has attracted discussion since the film's release.

== Appearances ==
=== Final Destination 3 ===
Wendy lives in McKinley, Pennsylvania, with her younger sister Julie. She is shown to be a control freak. She is dating Jason Wise, and is friends with Kevin Fischer and Carrie Dreyer. She is the school photographer for the yearbook. Wendy and her friends celebrate at the amusement park for their senior field trip. At the start of the film, Wendy admits that she doesn't care for Kevin, but as the movie goes on, she slowly forms a caring relationship with Kevin once she gets to know him better.

Before boarding a roller coaster ride known as "Devil's Flight", Wendy begins to have the feeling of "having no control". Shortly after being seated on the coaster, she suffers a premonition of the entire ride derailing and brutally killing her and all the other passengers. She panics and manages to get several of her fellow students off, before realizing her boyfriend Jason and best friend Carrie are still on the roller coaster. She fails to get them off the ride in time and witnesses the derailment of the roller coaster and the death of Jason and Carrie.

After the incident, she becomes determined to leave McKinley due to the bad memories. When she begins noticing that the photographs she took on the night of the roller coaster ride contain ominous clues as to how the other survivors will eventually meet their ends, she also learns details about the Flight 180 disaster, including the visionary who predicted it, Alex Browning, from Kevin beforehand. Initially skeptical of Kevin's findings, she becomes convinced after sensing a haunting presence stalking her. She then conducts her own research into premonitions, which leads her to discover another disaster, the U.S. Route 23 pile-up, which was strongly implied to be connected to the Flight 180 explosion. She then pairs up with him to save the other survivors, in time sensing that it is the same unseen entity that caused the past disasters stalking them; she ends up only managing to rescue Ian McKinley, her sister Julie, and Kevin from their second intended deaths. Shortly after, Ian confronts Wendy, Kevin, and Julie; he blames Wendy for his girlfriend Erin Ulmer's death and is determined to ensure that she will not survive. Fireworks behind Wendy nearly hit her, but she avoids them, and they hit a nearby aerial work platform. It collapses and kills Ian, who inadvertedly takes Wendy's place on Death's List. Wendy, Kevin, and Julie believe they have managed to escape Death, but five months later, Wendy sees signs relating to the events of both the roller coaster and the Flight 180 disasters, and senses something is wrong. After unexpectedly reuniting with Julie and Kevin, she receives another premonition that foretells their deaths in a subway crash. Her attempts to stop the subway are for naught, as the film cuts to black, with sounds of the train derailment being heard just as she runs towards the exit door, leaving her fate ambiguous.

==== In other media ====
In the "Choose Their Fate" bonus feature available on the DVD release of the movie, three alternate endings are available, with each one resulting in a different fate for Wendy. In the first alternate ending, after Ian gets completely crushed, she along with Kevin and Julie leave the tricentennial, but not before the camera which Wendy threw to the ground takes one last picture of them, presumably hinting their next way of death. In another ending, Wendy did not receive the second premonition and the film ends with the subway barreling straight into her, explicitly showing her death. In the final alternate ending, Wendy receives her vision before she boards the roller coaster, and manages to save herself along with Kevin, Jason, and Carrie; an epilogue shows that she changed her name to Ming and became a fortune teller.

Wendy appears in the novelization of Final Destination 3 by Christa Faust. The storyline follows the same one as the film up until the ending. The book uses the alternate ending in which her camera takes another picture of her after Ian’s death, hinting that death is still coming for her but ending the story there. In the novel, Wendy's relationship with Kevin, unlike in the film, becomes more romantic in nature over the events of the story.

== Development ==
=== Casting and creation ===
In a DVD feature for Final Destination 3 (2006), James Wong revealed that he originally intended for Wendy Christensen to be a "perky blonde" and that Alexis Bledel had auditioned for the role. Mary Elizabeth Winstead, who got cast in March 2005, had previously auditioned for Final Destination 2 (2003), won the role because she brought emotion and character that impressed Wong and Glen Morgan. When asked if she was a fan of the Final Destination franchise prior to being cast in the third film, Winstead mentioned auditioning for the second film saying, "Definitely. I was a fan of both films. I auditioned for the second one, but didn’t make it. I was happy to get a shot here". Wong described Wendy as being "deeply affected by the accident, but she’s strong, and fights to maintain control".

=== Fate ===
In 2011, producer Craig Perry stated that he "believes" both Wendy and her sister Julie are, in fact, dead. According to Winstead in 2012, however, the character is not dead: "I didn't die. Or rather, it's open to debate."

In January 2021, Screen Rant horror author Mara Bachman explored the possibilities of Wendy surviving. Bachman concluded her long analysis by saying that Wendy did not survive, and says that had she survived, she should be featured in the sixth installment, which she said is very unlikely, adding that Final Destination 5 completed the original movie timeline.

In the sixth installment of the franchise, Final Destination Bloodlines, released in 2025 after a fourteen-year-long hiatus since the fifth installment, William Bludworth mentions to the relatives of Iris Campbell that there are only two ways to cheat Death: “by killing, or by dying.” This indirectly leads to the possibility that Wendy is deceased, as she, throughout the third installment, did not kill anyone or use a method that would involve temporarily flatlining and then being successfully brought back to life. However, it is unclear whether William was accounting for all characters in the franchise generally, or if he simply had in mind the many individuals he has personally come into contact with or been visited by, as he never met Wendy, nor Nick O’Bannon, the protagonist and visionary of the fourth installment, The Final Destination.

== Critical reception and analysis ==
Both the character and Winstead’s performance have received a positive reception from critics. James Berardinelli says she "does as competent a job as one could expect in these dire circumstances." Felix Gonzalez, Jr. speaks positively of Winstead's and Merriman's performances, saying "the film is not entirely unwatchable. Mary Elizabeth Winstead and Ryan Merriman are likeable in the lead roles." TheDailyMacabre even goes on to say, "Winstead is a stronger lead than A. J. Cook".

Common Sense Media reacted positively to the character, saying that despite the movie not asking viewers to invest emotionally in the characters "you do invest, if only because of formula, in Wendy, who tries so hard to save her classmates." The Daily Telegraph listed Wendy as one of the top 20 final girls in horror films and praised Winstead's performance for making Wendy a believable character.

Louis B. Hobson however criticizes her and Merriman's performances, saying "Merriman and Winstead have basically two emotions. They're either grieving or terrified." Waffle Movies adds "the performance is too much", likening her performance to "the person who shows up to a Halloween costume party wearing a formal evening gown."

Chris Carle of IGN criticized the main characters for not being fleshed out enough, especially Wendy, who he claimed only had two traits: "She is a control freak and she cries a lot."

== See also ==
- Final girl
