= Kimberly Corman =

Final Destination character

- Final Destination character
- A. J. Cook as Kimberly Corman
- First appearance: Final Destination 2 (2003)
- Created by: Jeffrey Reddick; Eric Bress; J. Mackye Gruber
- Portrayed by: A. J. Cook

In-universe information
- Occupation: College student
- Family: Michael Corman (father); Mrs. Corman (mother, deceased)
- Origin: White Plains, New York
- Status: Alive

Kimberly Corman is a fictional character in the Final Destination series, portrayed by A. J. Cook. Kimberly serves as the protagonist of Final Destination 2. She is a college student from White Plains, New York, and is one of the survivors of the Route 23 pile-up.

After meeting William Bludworth and being informed that only "new life" can defeat Death, Kimberly drowns herself by driving an ambulance into a lake, only to be later resuscitated. In Final Destination Bloodlines (2025), when the Campbell-Reyes family visits him at the hospital, Bludworth informs them that Kimberly is still alive and the only individual he is aware of that managed to successfully remove themselves from Death's list.

== Fictional character biography ==
Kimberly was born in White Plains, New York, to Michael Corman. She is very close to her father, especially after her mother's death during a carjacking. Kimberly continues to blame herself for what happened since she stayed behind from her mother in an appliance store to watch a newsfeed about Tod Waggner's apparent suicide. Her mother was shot in their car when it was hijacked by street thugs. She is attending college with her friends Shaina, Dano, and Frankie, and was originally going to spend her spring break with her friends in Daytona Beach, Florida.

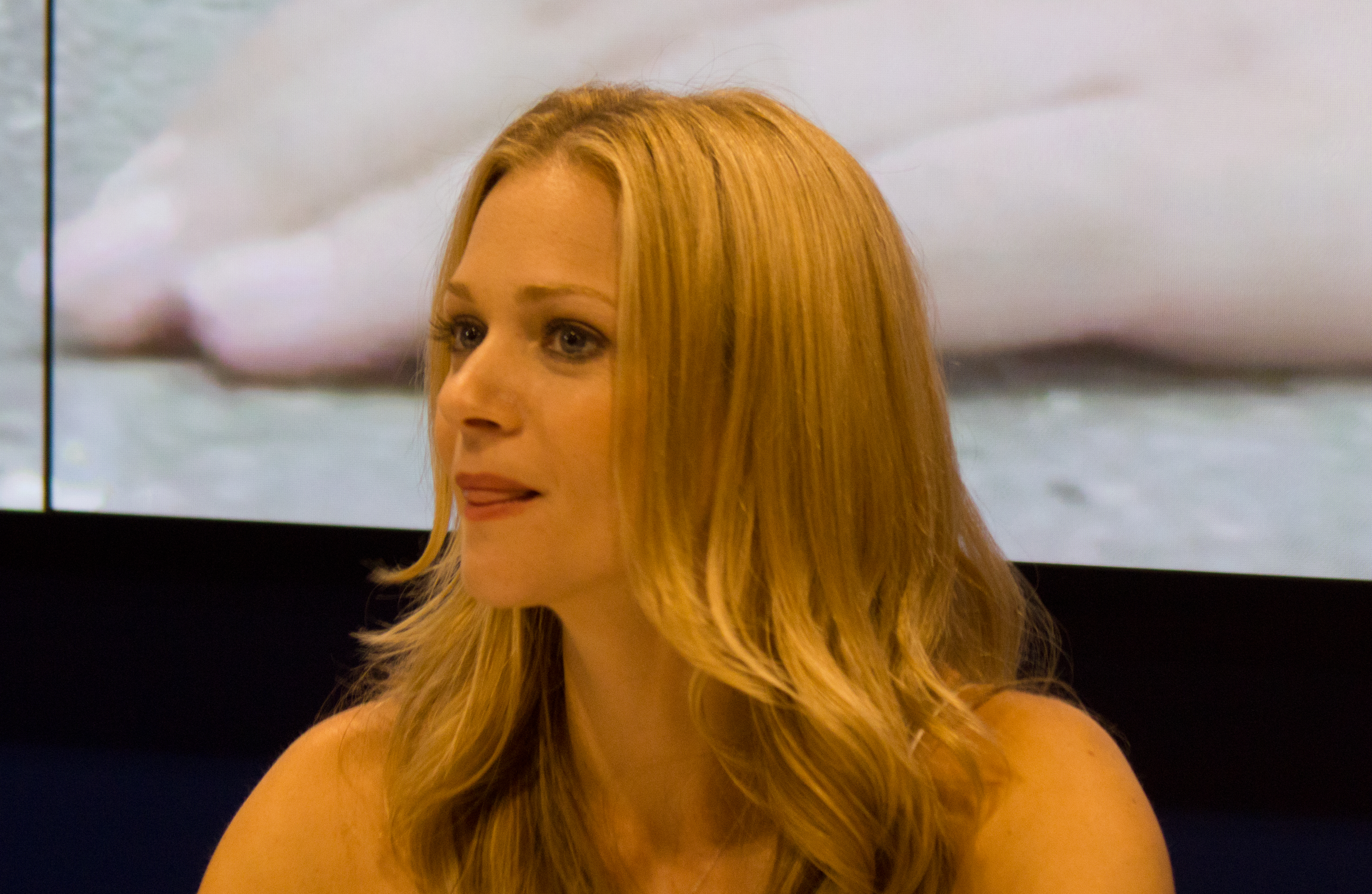
A. J. Cook in 2012

In the film, Kimberly decides to take Route 23 as a shortcut to Florida. While driving, she has an ominous vision of a highway pile-up caused by a log truck derailment; at the end of the vision, a mysterious truck coming out of nowhere rams into her car. After the premonition, she stalls her car sideways in front of the highway's on-ramp to prevent other drivers from going further. Kimberly and a handful of other drivers watch closely as vehicles ahead crash into one another and explode on the highway. To her surprise, another truck (the same truck that killed her at the end of her vision) smashes her SUV with her friends still in it, killing them, although she is rescued by Officer Thomas Burke.

Kimberly and other survivors are interrogated by Officer Burke afterwards, with Kimberly explaining her vision's similarity to Alex Browning's vision, and that they are now all on Death's list. The survivors disregard this until survivor Evan Lewis dies in his apartment later that night, alarming everyone, with Kimberly noticing Death's haunting presence. With Burke's help, Kimberly consults Clear Rivers, the last survivor of Flight 180, to save the remaining others. She also learns that after her death is averted by her premonition, she is now at the end of Death's list after Burke. Nevertheless, their attempts prove unsuccessful. Clear leads Kimberly and Officer Burke to mortician William Bludworth, who helps them by claiming that "new life" can defeat Death.

Kimberly realizes that pregnant survivor Isabella Hudson can save them; however, this proves false, since Isabella was meant to live even in the premonition. After two more deaths, Kimberly sacrifices herself for Officer Burke's safety by driving an ambulance into a lake, but Officer Burke rescues her and she is resuscitated by Dr. Ellen Kalarjian from her clinical death. Thinking they have finally cheated Death, Kimberly and Officer Burke go to a picnic with the Gibbons family, who tell them how their son Brian was saved from death by the survivors. To everyone's surprise, Brian is blown to pieces nearby due to a barbecue grill malfunction, a sign that Death sets a new plan in motion.

Kimberly is mentioned in the sixth movie. When Stefani Reyes and her remaining family members visit William Bludworth at the hospital where he works, he discloses that one person—Kimberly—is known to have broken the cycle by embracing Death and being resuscitated by her doctor.

=== Appearances in other media ===
Kimberly appears in the novelization of Final Destination 2 by Black Flame's authors Nancy A. Collins and Natasha Rhodes. The novelization features certain changes from the film, such as Kimberly's father being named Ambrose instead of Michael, and Rory being named as Rory Cunningham instead of Rory Peters. As in the film, both Kimberly and Officer Burke survive. Kimberly is also briefly referenced in the novel Looks Could Kill, where it is noted that the events of the Coral Clipper sinking took place on the same date as the Route 23 pile-up; and the Flight 180 explosion.

In the "Choose Their Fate" DVD bonus edition of Final Destination 3, a newspaper article shows that Kimberly and Burke ran into each other at a hardware store and a vehicle crashed through the building, knocking them into a nearby woodchipper. Kimberly's coat was tangled and snatched into the machine. Burke attempted to save her, and both were dismembered, with the attending physician who signed their death certificates being Dr. Kalarjian. However, the scene is confirmed to be non-canon as per Final Destination Bloodlines.

== Development ==
=== Casting and characterization ===
Final Destination creator Jeffrey Reddick originally envisioned Kimberly Corman as a black woman, but "when it got to the script stage, that description was removed and they cast a white actress". The role of Kimberly for Final Destination 2 (2003) was given to Canadian actress A. J. Cook, who previously starred in the film The Virgin Suicides (1999). Reddick stated that though he felt Cook was "great in the role", he had hoped that a black actress would have been considered for it as well.

Cook described her role as "a very strong girl, very determined because her mother died a year earlier, right in front of her eyes, so she's had to grow up quick". Cook added that "it's rare to find one strong female lead in a horror film, not to mention two [Larter]”. Director David R. Ellis and producer Craig Perry were amazed by her sensitivity and vulnerability in her performance and she was hired instantly. Ellis and Perry praised her act, with Perry stating that "[they] were at the beginning of what's going to be a long successful career for her". Ellis describe her role as "a girl who can have some fun cause they're going on a trip and they'll gonna have a good time, yet someone who can stand up to Clear, to come and challenge Clear on a race, and to bother with Clear". The character's surname was based by writer Jeffrey Reddick to American director Roger Corman, who directed the horror comedy film The Little Shop of Horrors (1960). Originally, Kimberly and her father Michael's surname was "Burroughs" in honor of Canadian actress Jackie Burroughs, who starred as Kate Flynn in the acclaimed crime thriller film The Grey Fox (1982) instead of Corman in the original script, but the writers decided to change it in the script revision.

=== Possible return and fate ===
In a 2020 interview with Digital Spy, Craig Perry revealed Kimberly and Officer Thomas Burke (portrayed by Michael Landes) were originally going to be included in the climax of Final Destination 3 (2006), which saw both characters intersect with Wendy Christensen (portrayed by Mary Elizabeth Winstead) on Train 081, effectively wrapping up the franchise. However, one of the two actors (Landes or Cook) was unavailable, so they decided not to pursue the idea. He commented further, "If we couldn't do it all the way, we decided it was best not to do it. To have just one of them leaves an open ending which would make no sense in Death's overarching plan. So we pocketed it because we knew that there was a really interesting idea about the cause and effect in the world of Final Destination, and then it managed to perfectly land in Final Destination 5 (2011).

Kimberly is referenced by William Bludworth in Final Destination Bloodlines (2025) as being the only individual he is aware of to have successfully cheated Death by dying and being revived, confirming she is still alive by the present day. Co-writer Guy Busick cited Kimberly's mention as a reference to the rules established in Final Destination 2 and Final Destination 5 about how to cheat Death (both films being their reference points for Bloodlines) and a good way to tie up the continuity of previous films to remind the audience about the franchise's canon, with Kimberly's mention in the story particularly setting up the subplot of Bobby and Erik Campbell trying to kill and revive the former to cheat Death despite how their grandmother Iris never did it due to the risks. Kimberly's survival made the filmmakers debate if Stefani and Charlie Reyes should survive the events of the film or not, but they ultimately concluded that she was an exception because the franchise's theme is that no one can cheat Death. Originally, they considered having Cook reprise her role and included Kimberly in the film's first draft, but according to co-director Adam Stein, they decided against it as "[they] couldn't get over the fact that she was just, like, waiting there in the closet or something for [the Campbell family] to show up".

== Reception ==
Cook's performance met mixed reviews among critics. Robert Koehler of Variety said that "the giddy sequences also help in getting past the generally awful thesping, led by Cook, whose blurry grasp of emotions betrays Ellis' apparent disinterest in his actors." David Grove of Film Threat panned Cook's acting, stating that "she's no great actress, but she's a real looker" and teased that "since when did a horror movie suffer from having two dumb blondes as leads" (referring to Cook, who is a natural blonde in real life), the other actress referring to Ali Larter's portrayal of Clear Rivers. Dustin Putman of TheMovieBoy.com commented about Cook's emotional scenes:

Taking over where Devon Sawa's Alex took off, A. J. Cook (2001's Out Cold) is serviceable as the premonition-fueled Kimberly, but doesn't evoke enough emotion in the scenes following the brutal deaths of her close friends.

Nevertheless, Robin Clifford of Reeling Reviews stated that "Cook was strident as the catalyst that sparks events with her premonitions of disaster and her fervent desire to cheat the Reaper." Brett Gallman of Oh, The Horror! claimed that Cook and fellow actor Michael Landes were "serviceable as leads." Alyssa Mertes Serio of Comic Book Resources ranked Kimberly as the 4th best character in the Final Destination franchise, and stated that "The final girl movie trope is in good hands with Kimberly Corman."
