= William Bludworth =

Final Destination character

- Final Destination character
- Tony Todd as William Bludworth in Final Destination 5 (2011)
- First appearance: Final Destination (2000)
- Last appearance: Final Destination Bloodlines (2025)
- Created by: Jeffrey Reddick
- Portrayed by: Tony Todd; Jayden Oniah (young)

In-universe information
- Full name: William John Bludworth
- Nickname: JB
- Occupation: Funeral director Forensic pathologist at Hope River Hospital
- Family: Evie Bludworth (mother, deceased)
- Location: Mt. Abraham, New York; North Bay, New York; Cloverdale, New York
- Status: Deceased (presumably)

William John Bludworth is a fictional character in the Final Destination film series, portrayed by Tony Todd. As the most prominent recurring character in the franchise, he appears in Final Destination, Final Destination 2, Final Destination 5, and Final Destination Bloodlines. Bludworth also appears in the novelizations of the first two films, and Final Destination: Death of the Senses (2006).

William Bludworth is a coroner, mortician, and the owner of Bludworth Funeral Homes, and has expert knowledge of Death and its forces or capacities. In the films, he appears as a mysterious and somewhat intimidating figure that the protagonists come across, usually after survivors begin dying. He would explain to them the nature of Death and its design and rules, and impart advice on how to cheat or navigate it, albeit in vague ways left up to the characters' interpretation. His nihilistic outlook and quite threatening tone towards the survivors often leaves the characters shaken.

== Films ==
=== Final Destination (2000) ===
In the first film, Alex Browning and Clear Rivers sneak inside the morgue to view Tod Waggner's corpse. Bludworth catches them and asks why they came. Offering his help, he explains to them the rule of Death: those who cheat death will be revisited by Death to reclaim the lives that should have been lost. He also tells them about Death's list (a list of the order of deaths of the survivors in the original incident) and states that ruining the list can affect the remaining survivors, but also warns them about the consequences of tampering with the design.

=== Final Destination 2 (2003) ===
In the second film, Bludworth is revisited by Clear, together with Kimberly Corman and Thomas Burke, to obtain help cheating Death. He is seen de-accessorizing the corpse of Evan Lewis. However, he only mentions to them the rule of life and death: new life can defeat Death. At first the characters think this means the birth of a child whose mother was supposed to die. However, it is revealed later that if one of the survivors were to die and then be revived, that would invalidate Death's list. Kimberly eventually intentionally drowns herself and is resuscitated.

=== Final Destination 3 (2006) ===
Bludworth does not appear in the third film. However, Tony Todd's voice can be heard as part of an animatronic devil in a theme park at the beginning of the film. The devil statue is part of the entrance to a rollercoaster that causes a chain of events that leads to the death of all of its passengers. At the end of the film, he also voices a train announcement.

=== Final Destination 5 (2011) ===
Despite being absent from the third and fourth films, Bludworth reappears in the fifth film. In this film, he first appears at the funeral following the bridge collapse, warning Sam Lawton and Peter Friedkin that Death doesn't like to be cheated. Sam and Peter later notice him as the coroner at the scenes after the deaths of Candice Hooper and Isaac Palmer. After Isaac's death, the characters confront Bludworth, who explains to Sam that he changed Death's plan by surviving the bridge collapse. He informs them that only by taking a life can they live, for they will receive the lifespan of the person they have killed. The point they neglect to realize, however, is that they have no way of knowing how long the person they would kill has to live on their remaining lifespan. It is later revealed that this film is a prequel and thus takes place before the first Final Destination film.

=== Final Destination Bloodlines (2025) ===
In the sixth film, Bludworth's knowledge of Death is finally explained when he is visited by Stefani Reyes and her remaining family members at the hospital where he works. As a child, then nicknamed "JB", he was present at the Sky View restaurant tower's opening ceremony, alongside his mother, a singer. Stefani's grandmother, Iris Campbell, foresaw the tower's collapse and was able to prevent it, saving hundreds of people, including Bludworth. He shares that he worked with Iris over the years to find a way to save themselves from their deaths, including observing Death's targets, explaining why Bludworth advised survivors like Sam Lawton, Alex Browning, and Kimberly Corman in the previous films, hoping to find solutions through learning their actions. Bludworth explains the methods to disrupt Death's plan—taking the life of another, or gaining a new life, adding that only Kimberly Corman is known to have survived and beaten Death's design by using the latter method. However, he warns them that interfering with Death's plan will have consequences, and shares his belief that they will not succeed. He discloses that he is terminally ill and will die after Iris's bloodline dies, since he was the last to die in her premonition. He then reveals to be retiring that day, giving up his own fight for survival after seeing the majority of Death's targets' failures, and tells the family that he intends to enjoy the time he has left, hoping that Death would allow him to die in peace, suggesting they do the same. Imparting to them that life is precious and to enjoy every single second, he wishes them good luck before he leaves with his belongings.

== Literature ==
Bludworth appears in the novelizations of Final Destination (written by Natasha Rhodes) and Final Destination 2 (co-written by Rhodes and Nancy A. Collins), published by Black Flame. Bludworth also has a small role in the novel Final Destination: Death of the Senses (2006), written by Andy McDermott. In Death of the Senses, visionary Jack Curtis (the bus driver that ran over Terry Chaney) and Amy Tom visit St. Vincent's Hospital, looking for information on the would-be serial killer that Jack killed in self-defense. There, they encounter Bludworth, who informs them about Death's design and that they should watch out for clues.

== Casting ==
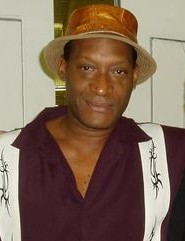
Tony Todd, famous for portraying the title role in the Candyman films, played William Bludworth in four of the six films. Todd's role is one of only two characters to appear in at least two films besides Ali Larter's character Clear Rivers.

Tony Todd, who played Candyman in the 1992 film Candyman, was cast as mortician William Bludworth. Writer Glen Morgan initially wanted Todd for the role for his deep voice that would give the film an eerie tone. Todd was initially meant to appear in the 2009 sequel The Final Destination, but was unable to due to his commitments to the 2009 film Transformers: Revenge of the Fallen.

Todd's return to the franchise in the 2025 sequel Final Destination Bloodlines was announced in 2023. However, Todd was already ill, having told the producers that he was secretly battling stomach cancer and the crew knew it would likely be his final performance on film. Directors Zach Lipovsky and Adam Stein encouraged Todd to improvise and write Bludworth's final monologue as if he was imparting advice to the fans. Todd died in November 2024, with the film released posthumously in May 2025.

== Reception ==
Todd's performance in Final Destination has received positive reviews among critics. Joe Leydon of Variety complimented his performance, saying that "Todd—an old hand at scary stories after the Candyman series—overplays with enough relish to position himself as a probable returnee for a Final Destination 2". Brett Gallman of Oh, The Horror! described Todd's wry and sinister portrayal "has crafted one of the genre's most memorable characters in recent memory, though he's only appeared twice for about five total minutes in the series."

On the other hand, Todd's role in Final Destination 2 received mixed reviews among critics, most complaining about his minimal screentime. Robert Koehler of Variety remarked that Todd's "single, distinctly flat scene" was wasted by the filmmakers. Gallman of Oh, The Horror! was enticed by Todd's role "whose purpose has still yet to be revealed in the franchise."

Eric Goldman of IGN praised Todd's reprisal in Final Destination 5, stating that "Upon his return, he brings a ton of his usual gravity, humor and menace to the role", and hoped that the character would return for a sequel.

Amy West of GamesRadar+ referred to the character as a "fan favorite" and a "horror icon". Kayla Turner of Screen Rant ranked Bludworth as the best character in the Final Destination series due to his mysterious yet compelling portrayal, as well as the complexity he added to the narrative.

Todd made sure the filmmakers did not "write him out of the movie" when Final Destination Bloodlines was announced, and despite his illness, he reprised his role as Bludworth. Todd's performance was praised as a proper send off for both the character and the actor himself, with director Adam Stein calling it "inspirational." Todd Gilcrest of Variety said that "Bludworth offers both a tender tribute to the horror luminary and retroactive connective tissue between the franchise's disparate chapters." Frank Scheck of The Hollywood Reporter called Todd the "acting highlight" of Bloodlines and said he serves as "a poignant reminder that in real life, as in these movies, death comes for everybody."

== See also ==
- Magical Negro
