= Kaitlyn Santa Juana =

Canadian actress (born 1997)

- Born: April 19, 1997 (age 29); Langley, British Columbia, Canada
- Occupation: Actress
- Years active: 2016–present
- Height: 5 ft 3 in (160 cm)

Kaitlyn Santa Juana (born April 19, 1997) is a Canadian actress and singer. She is known for her roles as Lydia Sánchez in the eighth season of the CW series The Flash (2022) and Stefani Reyes in the horror film Final Destination Bloodlines (2025).

== Early life ==
Santa Juana was born in Langley, British Columbia, Canada. She is of Filipino and Czech/Slovak descent.

== Career ==
Santa Juana began her acting career in 2016. In 2022, she portrayed Cotton Allen in the science fiction horror film The Friendship Game. She has appeared in The Flash.

In addition to her screen work, Santa Juana has a background in musical theatre. She joined the Canadian production of Dear Evan Hansen in 2019, understudying the roles of Zoe Murphy and Alana Beck. She later joined the Broadway company, continuing in these roles.

In March 2024, it was announced that Santa Juana would star as Stefani in Final Destination Bloodlines, the sixth installment of the Final Destination franchise. The film is directed by Zach Lipovsky and Adam B. Stein, and was released in May 2025.

== Filmography ==
Key
†	Denotes films that have not yet been released

=== Film ===
Year	Title	Role	Notes
2022	The Friendship Game	Cotton Allen	
2022	He's Not Worth Dying For	Ari	Television film
2022	We Need a Little Christmas	Nadine	Television film
2025	Final Destination Bloodlines	Stefani Reyes	

=== Television ===
Year	Title	Role	Notes
2022	The Flash	Lydia Sanchez	2 episodes
TBA	Grendel	Rose	1 episode

== Stage ==
- Dear Evan Hansen as Zoe Murphy/Alana Beck (understudy) – Canadian production (2019), Broadway production
