= Sam Easton =

Canadian actor

- Born: October 4, 1979 (age 46); Vancouver, British Columbia, Canada
- Occupation: Actor
- Years active: 2002–2013

Sam Easton (born October 4, 1979) is a Canadian former actor.

== Biography ==
Sam Easton was born in Vancouver, British Columbia, Canada. He studied at Humber College, winning the Phil Hartman Comedy Award for best student in 2000 Later that same year he was nominated for the Tim Sims Award. Easton has had supporting roles in The L Word, Underclassman, Final Destination 3, and Howie Do It

== Filmography ==
Year	Title	Role	Notes
2003	The Delicate Art of Parking	Mustang Owner	
2004	The Butterfly Effect	Theta Chi Pledge	
2004	Part of the Game	Crazy Chris	
2004	Underclassman	Oliver Horn	
2005	Puck This	Jerry	
2006	Final Destination 3	Frankie Cheeks	
2006	Crossed	Chauncey	
2007	Decoys 2: Alien Seduction	Arnold Steiner	
2008	That One Night	Bobby	
2009	Howie Do It	Himself	
2013	No Clue	J Bird	(final film role)
