= Ecstasia Sanders =

American-Canadian actress (born 1985)

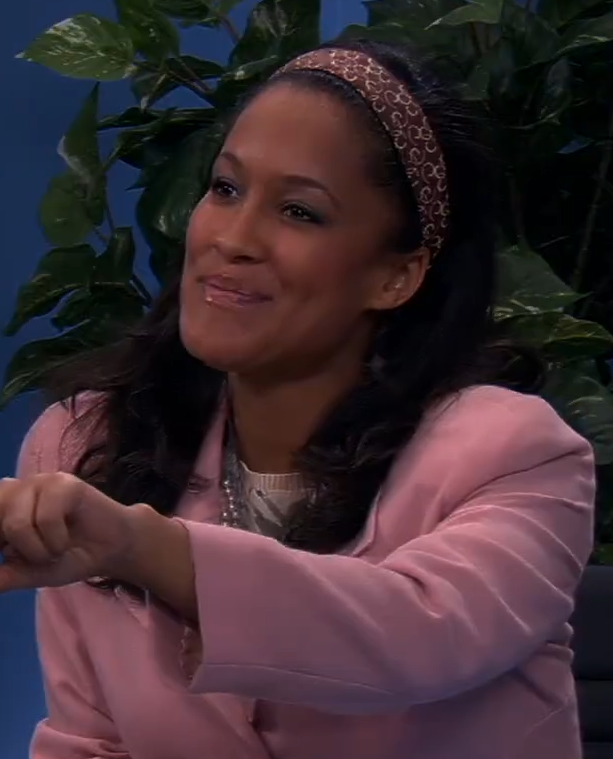
- Sanders in Mr. Young
- Born: Ecstasia Lenore Sanders; San Diego, California, United States
- Occupation: Actress
- Years active: 1996–present

Ecstasia Lenore Sanders is an American-Canadian actress. She's known for her supporting roles in Final Destination 3 (2006) and Dr. Dolittle 3 (2006).

== Early life ==
The daughter of performers, Ecstasia Sanders was born in San Diego, California. At an early age, her family moved to Vancouver, British Columbia. Sanders initially appeared in commercials at an early age, before moving to other acting roles. She is currently studying at the Lyric School of Acting.

== Filmography ==
=== Film ===
Year	Title	Role	Notes
2004	Catwoman		Stuntwoman
2006	Final Destination 3	Amber Regan	
2006	Dr. Dolittle 3	Tammy	
2010	Hot Tub Time Machine	Girl in Club	Uncredited role
2013	Swindle	Hotel Lobby Desk Manager	cameo role

=== Television ===
Year	Title	Role	Notes
1996	Color Me Perfect	Gina	TV movie
2004	The L Word	Dancer	Episode: "Lucky, Next Time"
2004	The Collector	Walker's Girlfriend	Episode: "The Rapper"
2004–2006	Smallville	Pete's Admirer #1 / Talon Girl #1 / Talon Waitress	Episodes: "Whisper", "Spirit", and "Oracle"
2006	Orpheus	Patty's Friend #2	TV movie
2006	Killer Instinct	Hannah	Episode: "While You Were Sleeping"
2006	Kyle XY	Jenna	Episode: "This is not a Test"
2007	A Valentine Carol	Bailey	TV movie
2008	Stargate: Atlantis	Villager	Episode: "Inquisition"
2009	Supernatural	Bartender	Episode: "Criss Angel is a Douche Bag"
2009	Virtuality	Kate Thibadeau	TV movie
2009	The Assistants	Chloe Brubaker	Episode: "The Loophole"
2009	Psych	Chelsea Patterson	Episode: "High Top Fade Out"
2010	Fringe	Jenna	Episode: "The Bishop Revival"
2010	Sins of the Mother	Stephanie	TV movie
2010	Human Target	Teller (Denise-SF)	Episode: "Ilsa Pucci"
2011	Endgame	Deirdre Knebworth-Hall	Episode: "The White Queen"
2011	Three Weeks, Three Kids	Sarah Christie	TV movie
2011–2012	True Justice	Cathy / Mason's Wife	3 episodes
2012	Mr. Young	Secretary	Episode: "Mr. Cyclops"
2014	Arctic Air	Hannah	Episode: "The Finish Line", "The Fling"
2014	When Sparks Fly	Sylvia Sherwin	TV movie
2014	Paper Angels	Beth Anne Wilson	TV movie
2015	A Gift of Miracles	Mindy	TV movie
2016	Kindergarten Cop 2	Hot Mom	
2016	Summer in the City	Customer #2	TV movie
2018	Van Helsing	Angry Woman	Episode: "Pretty Noose"
2021	Superman & Lois	Power Plant Reporter	Episode: "Pilot"
2021	Aurora Teagarden: How to Con a Con	Amanda Gaines	TV movie
2021	Motherland: Fort Salem	Fixer #1	Episode: "Not Our Daughters"
2021	Imperfect High	Administrator	TV movie
2021	The Santa Stakeout	Amy Morris	TV movie
2021	Supergirl	Dana	Episode: "The Last Gauntlet", "Truth or Consequences"
2021	Nancy Drew	Officer Joyce Marquez	Episode: "The Gambit of the Tangled Souls", "The Myth of the Ensnared Hunter", "The Demon of Piper Beach", "The Journey of the Dangerous Mind", "The Warning of the Frozen Heart"
2022	Butlers in Love	Marie	
