= Underclassman =

2005 film by Marcos Siega

- Theatrical release poster
- Directed by: Marcos Siega
- Written by: Brent Goldberg; David Wagner
- Produced by: Peter Abrams; Robert L. Levy; Andrew Panay
- Starring: Nick Cannon; Shawn Ashmore; Roselyn Sánchez; Kelly Hu; Hugh Bonneville; Cheech Marin
- Cinematography: David Hennings
- Edited by: Nicholas C. Smith
- Music by: BT
- Production company: Tapestry Films
- Distributed by: Miramax Films
- Release date: September 2, 2005
- Running time: 95 minutes
- Country: United States
- Language: English
- Budget: $25 million
- Box office: $5.6 million

Underclassman is a 2005 American action comedy film directed by Marcos Siega and starring Nick Cannon, Shawn Ashmore, Roselyn Sánchez, Kelly Hu, Hugh Bonneville, and Cheech Marin. It was released on September 2, 2005, had been originally set for a release in 2004. The film was a critical and box office disappointment, receiving only a 6% rating on Rotten Tomatoes and grossing $5.6 million on a production budget of $25 million.

== Plot ==
Tracy "Tre" Stokes (Nick Cannon) is a 23-year-old bike cop working for the Los Angeles Police Department. Tre dreams of being a police detective, like his late father, but his mentor Captain Delgado (Cheech Marin) believes he is not ready based on his reckless behavior. While playing basketball, Delgado is approached by a representative of the Mayor's office looking to place an undercover detective into the prestigious Westbury School after a student was killed at a party. Tre volunteers to go undercover, and Delgado reluctantly agrees to give him a chance.

Tre's mark is Rob Donovan (Shawn Ashmore), whose name was written on a piece of paper at the scene of the crime. Attempting to befriend Rob on the basketball court after school, Tre learns about a local basketball tournament, the Blacktop Battle, which Rob is captaining for Westbury. Tre arrives at the Blacktop Battle where Westbury is being handily defeated by their crosstown rival. Joining the game, Tre wins the game and impresses Rob, but antagonizing his friends with his selfish play. The next day Tre learns of a party at the marina that Rob routinely throws, and shows up with a borrowed jetski for a race. When a former student and rival of Rob's shows up at the party there is a fight and Tre and Rob are thrown in jail where they form a bond.

Tre soon discovers that at every high school party in the area a luxury car seems to be stolen. Tre plans a sting involving throwing his own party at Captain Delgado's home using the Captain's prized '65 Corvette Stingray, Juanita, as bait. Tre sees Rob steal the car, but allows him to escape instead of stopping him, resulting on him getting fired from the force. Continuing the investigation himself, Tre discovers that the cars have been housed at a warehouse on campus and that Rob and his friends have been forced to steal the cars against their will. Headmaster Felix Powers (Hugh Bonneville), realizing Tre is an undercover cop, enlists his co-conspirators to kidnap and murder Tre at the Blacktop Battle championship game. Tre is abducted along with Karen and they are brought to the campus warehouse to be killed while Powers goes to the docks to trade the stolen vehicles for drugs. Tre, with the help of backup, escapes and interrupts Powers’ drug deal and rescues Karen. Tre then kills Powers during a high speed boat chase in the harbor. In the end Tre graduates high school and is reinstated to the force.

== Cast ==
- Nick Cannon as Tracy "Tre" Stokes
- Roselyn Sánchez as Karen Lopez
- Kelly Hu as Lisa Brooks
- Ian Gomez as Det. Gallecki
- Shawn Ashmore as Rob Donovan
- Hugh Bonneville as Headmaster Felix Powers
- Cheech Marin as Captain Victor Delgado
- Johnny Lewis as Alexander Jeffries
- Angelo Spizzirri as David Boscoe
- Vishiss as Edward Murdock
- Adrian Young as Jose
- Don McManus as Julian Reynolds
- Mary Pat Gleason as Mrs. Hagerty
- Peter Bryant as Michael Barry
- Sam Easton as Oliver Horn
- Kaylee DeFer as Des
- Terry Chen as Sleepy Morris
- Jamie Kaler as Beach Police Officer
- Ben Cotton as Raver
- Zak Santiago as Anderson
- Dan Shea as Weston
- Sarah Jane Morris as Jamie (uncredited)

== Production ==
In June 2003, music video director Marcos Siega was announced as director of Underclassman. Shawn Ashmore joined the cast in August 2003.

== Reception ==
=== Box office ===
Underclassman was released on Labor Day weekend (September 2) in 2005, and performed poorly at the box office opening at number 11 with $3,393,610. Overall Underclassman earned just $5,655,459 against a budget of $25 million in seven weeks of release.

=== Critical response ===
Underclassman received universally negative reviews from critics. On the review aggregator website Rotten Tomatoes, 6% of 83 critics' reviews are positive. The website's consensus reads: "Despite the appealing presence of Nick Cannon, Underclassman is a shopworn knockoff of both Beverly Hills Cop and 21 Jump Street." Metacritic, which uses a weighted average, assigned the film a score of 19 out of 100, based on 25 critics, indicating "Overwhelming dislike". Underclassman is currently the sixth worst reviewed film on Metacritic released in 2005.
