= Alex Browning =

Final Destination character

- Final Destination character
- Devon Sawa as Alex Browning
- First appearance: Final Destination (2000)
- Last appearance: Final Destination 5 (Note: Archive footage) (2011)
- Created by: Jeffrey Reddick
- Portrayed by: Devon Sawa
- Status: Deceased

In-universe information
- Full name: Alexander Theodore Browning
- Gender: Male
- Occupation: Student at Mt. Abraham High School
- Family: Ken Browning (father); Barbara Browning (mother)
- Significant others: Clear Rivers (girlfriend)
- Children: Alexander Chance Browning (son, with Clear Rivers; alternate ending only)
- Relatives: Mr. Larry Murnau (French teacher); Ms. Valerie Lewton (French teacher); Tod and George Waggner (best friends)
- Home: Mt. Abraham, New York
- Rivals: Carter Horton (formerly)
- Cause of death: Bashed by a falling brick. Alternatively, electrocuted by a power cable (non-canon).

Alexander "Alex" Theodore Browning is a fictional character in the Final Destination series created by Jeffrey Reddick and portrayed by Canadian actor Devon Sawa. Alex serves as the protagonist of the original Final Destination film in 2000. Alex is a senior student at the fictional Mt. Abraham High School and one of the students at his French language class aboard Volée Airlines Flight 180 from New York to Paris, based on the real-life disaster of TWA Flight 800 in 1996.

== Character biography ==
=== Background ===
Alexander Theodore Browning was born on September 25, 1982, in the fictional town of Mt. Abraham, New York to Ken and Barbara Browning. He has been friends with siblings Tod and George Waggner since childhood and had been his classmates through high school since then. He is studying at the fictional Mt. Abraham High School and is the rival of Carter Horton. Alex frequently fights with Carter whenever they are together and often cannot control his actions. Alex is one of the students at his French language class qualified to travel to Paris for the school's annual field trip.

=== Final Destination ===
In Final Destination, Alex and the senior class of Mt. Abraham High School board Volée Airlines Flight 180, which is bound for departure from New York City's JFK International for Paris. While on board, Alex has an ominous dream of the plane exploding in mid-air. After warning everyone about it, he and some of his schoolmates are removed from the plane. While waiting at the airport, Alex witnesses the plane explode as he predicted. FBI agents Schreck and Weine interview the survivors afterwards and believe that Alex was responsible for blowing up Flight 180. While attending the memorial for the victims, Alex notices both agents carefully observing him and develops a relationship with Clear Rivers. Tod and Terry Chaney die afterwards and the Waggner household's anger towards Alex grows. With the help of Clear, Alex encounters William Bludworth, a mortician who knows more about Death than anyone else. Later that night, Alex realizes that Death is claiming back their lives which should have been lost on the plane, and is attacking them according to the order of their deaths on the plane. Alex and Clear attempt to save the remaining survivors, but fail in their attempts, with the exception of Carter. Knowing he is next to die, Alex suddenly realizes that he had exchanged seats in his original premonition, thus Clear will die before him. Finding Clear inside her car and trapped by live wires, Alex sacrifices himself by touching the wires to let Clear escape. It is revealed later on that Alex had survived the electrocution after rescuing Clear. Now in Paris six months after Flight 180, the film ends with Carter saving Alex from a falling neon sign, but the sign swings back and kills Carter instead.

=== Later films ===
In Final Destination 2, a newspaper headline revealed that Alex and Clear begin dating at some point after the first film. Clear reveals to Route 23 pile-up survivor Kimberly Corman that Alex died by being bludgeoned on the head by a dislodged brick from a nearby building. This was, however, not the original idea for this death; another version of the script had Alex be killed—still off-screen—by a ceiling fan. This death was not his original planned death either, for a third version of the script (the original script) had Alex be killed by a flesh-eating virus. Alex is briefly mentioned in Final Destination 3 by Kevin Fischer, a survivor of the Devil's Flight roller coaster derailment while he explains to fellow survivor and visionary Wendy Christensen about the Flight 180 explosion and the sudden deaths of the survivors of the plane crash. He appears via archive footage in Final Destination 5, in which he is being removed from Flight 180 and warns Sam Lawton and Molly Harper that the plane will explode during take-off, revealing that this film is actually a prequel to the original film.

=== Alternate ending ===
In the alternate ending of the original film, Alex and Clear have sex on a beach before meeting Carter and Billy Hitchcock at their school, resulting in Clear's pregnancy. Later on, Alex dies after the live wire sets him on fire, incinerating him while attempting to save Clear. Nine months later, Clear gives birth to Alexander "Alex" Chance Browning and reunites with Carter, safe in the knowledge that they have finally defeated Death.

== Casting ==
"There's not a lot of good stuff, you know, for my age. You get a lot of scripts and all but their teen ensembles and they're just "crap". And then I got Flight 180..... I mean, it's just awesome."

— Devon Sawa on how he was amazed by the script of Final Destination.

The role of Alex Browning was the challenging part for the writers, since they wanted Alex to show a variety of differing emotions throughout the film. Initially the role of Alex, the last one cast, was given to Tobey Maguire, but later it went to Canadian actor Devon Sawa, who previously starred in the 1999 film Idle Hands. Sawa commented that when "[he] read the script on a plane, it just freaked him out" and "[he] went down and met Glen and Jim and [he] thought they were amazing and already had some great ideas". However, writers Glen Morgan and James Wong were still not sure about casting him, so asked him to perform again and reviewed his previous work. Morgan was amazed by his performance in Idle Hands and Sawa was hired. Sawa described his role as "in the beginning, [Alex] was kinda loopy and cotter, and you know, probably not the most popular guy in school. I think he might have been a dork, you know, doing their stuff and they had their own thing going and they're after the two beautiful girls in school, but there's no chance of that happening. I guess after the plane goes down, his world completely changes." Perry was amazed by Sawa's vulnerability in acting, describing him as "a very distinctive actor". "He's very loose and he's kind of a cut-up when he's not on camera; but the moment the camera's on, I'd never seen anybody to completely slide right through the moment." Perry added. The character's surname was based by writer Jeffrey Reddick to American director Tod Browning, who directed both horror classics Dracula and Freaks. Besides Alex, Wong also chose the name of Alex's best friend, Tod Waggner, as a reference to the director's first name.

== Reception ==
Sawa's performance earned him a Saturn Award for Best Performance by a Younger Actor, and a nomination from Blockbuster Entertainment Awards for Favorite Actor in Horror (Internet Only). Moreover, Sawa's performance of Alex received generally positive reviews among critics. Stephen Holden of The New York Times commented that "The disaster and Alex's premonitions set up a heavy-handed fable about death and teenage illusions of invulnerability.", while Jami Bernard of the New York Daily News noted that "Sawa is solid as an Everyteen saddled with a rare and unwelcome gift". David Nusair of Reel Film Reviews remarked "Sawa's personable turn as the hero is matched by a uniformly effective supporting cast rife with familiar faces (i.e. Seann William Scott, Brendan Fehr, Tony Todd, etc)..."; while Joe Leydon of Variety pointed out that "Sawa is credible as the second-sighted Alex --- unlike many other actors cast a teen protagonists, he actually looks like he might still be attending high school --- but the supporting players are an uneven bunch." Mick LaSalle of the San Francisco Chronicle praised Sawa and Ali Larter's pairing, observing that "Larter and Sawa, who becomes more scruffy and wild-eyed as the film progresses, make an appealing pair." Dustin Putman of TheMovieBoy.com praised Sawa's performance, saying:

Devon Sawa, a rising star who put his physical comedy skills to good use in 1999's underseen slasher-comedy, "Idle Hands," is even more of a charismatic presence here. The conflicting emotions he feels for his survival, which he comes to believe he wasn't meant to do, as well as the loss of the other passengers, is superbly and subtly acted on his part. One scene, in which he is watching a news report on the crash and slowly begins to break down is especially realistic and powerful.
