= Final Destination Bloodlines =

2025 American supernatural horror film

- Theatrical release poster
- Directed by: Zach Lipovsky; Adam Stein
- Screenplay by: Guy Busick; Lori Evans Taylor
- Story by: Jon Watts; Guy Busick; Lori Evans Taylor
- Based on: Characters by Jeffrey Reddick
- Produced by: Craig Perry; Sheila Hanahan Taylor; Jon Watts; Dianne McGunigle; Toby Emmerich
- Starring: Kaitlyn Santa Juana; Teo Briones; Richard Harmon; Owen Patrick Joyner; Anna Lore; Brec Bassinger; Tony Todd
- Cinematography: Christian Sebaldt
- Edited by: Sabrina Pitre
- Music by: Tim Wynn (Note: Original themes by Shirley Walker)
- Production companies: New Line Cinema; Practical Pictures; Freshman Year; Fireside Films
- Distributed by: Warner Bros. Pictures
- Release date: May 16, 2025
- Running time: 110 minutes
- Country: United States
- Language: English
- Budget: $50 million
- Box office: $317.9 million

Final Destination Bloodlines is a 2025 American supernatural horror film directed by Zach Lipovsky and Adam Stein, and written by Guy Busick and Lori Evans Taylor. It is the sixth installment in the Final Destination film series, and stars Kaitlyn Santa Juana as a college student who inherits visions of a 1969 premonition that averted a deadly skyscraper failure from her dying grandmother, who warns her granddaughter that Death is coming for their family. Teo Briones, Richard Harmon, Owen Patrick Joyner, Anna Lore, Brec Bassinger, and Tony Todd appear in supporting roles.

After the commercial success of the previous film, a sixth film entered development, described as a re-imagining of the franchise. In March 2020, series producer Craig Perry said the film would be set "in the world of first responders". In January 2022, the film was scheduled for release on the streaming service HBO Max, with Lipovsky and Stein directing and Busick joining Taylor as co-writer. In March 2024, Warner Bros. Pictures announced that the film would instead receive a theatrical release. Filming took place in Vancouver from March to May 2024, following delays caused by the SAG-AFTRA strike.

Final Destination Bloodlines was released in the United States on May 16, 2025, by Warner Bros. Pictures. The film received positive reviews from critics and grossed $317.9 million, becoming both the best-reviewed and highest-grossing installment in the series. A sequel is scheduled for release in May 2028.

== Plot ==
In 1969, Iris Campbell and her boyfriend Paul attend the grand opening of the Sky View, an observation tower restaurant. Iris has a premonition that a chain of events will cause the tower to collapse, killing everyone inside. She warns the attendees and prevents the disaster, but in doing so disrupts Death's design.

Fifty-five years later, Iris and Paul's granddaughter, college student Stefani Reyes, is plagued by recurring nightmares of the averted disaster and returns home seeking answers. She reunites with her father, Marty, and younger brother Charlie, then visits her uncle Howard, aunt Brenda, and cousins Erik, Julia, and Bobby. When Stefani asks about Iris, Howard explains that he and Stefani's mother, Darlene, were raised in an overprotective, isolated environment, contributing to family tensions and Darlene's absence. Brenda helps Stefani find letters from Iris leading to a fortified cabin where Iris, terminally ill with cancer, now lives.

Iris recounts the Sky View incident, explaining that after she prevented the collapse, Death began killing the survivors in the order they were originally meant to die, along with their descendants. Following Paul's death, Iris documented Death's actions in a notebook to protect her family. Stefani doubts her story and tries to leave, but Iris follows her outside, gives her the notebook, and allows herself to be fatally impaled by a weather vane to prove her claims.

At Iris's funeral, Darlene returns, but Stefani resents her for abandoning her and Charlie during their childhood. The notebook mentions "JB", who discovered someone who defeated Death. During a family barbecue, a chain of events kills Howard with his lawnmower. After his funeral, Stefani warns the family that Death is coming, but they remain skeptical. A fire breaks out at Erik's tattoo shop, but his leather jacket saves him. The next day, Stefani and Charlie try to protect Erik, believing he is next, but Julia is crushed by a garbage truck's compactor. Brenda later reveals that Erik was conceived during an affair while her marriage was under strain from Iris; lacking the Campbell bloodline, he was bypassed by Death.

Darlene suggests finding "JB", who is William Bludworth. A child at the Sky View and the final person to die in Iris's original premonition, Bludworth explains that Iris later found him and that they learned Death's rules together. He tells the family that Death can be defeated either by taking another life (Note: As depicted in Final Destination 5 (2011)) or by becoming clinically dead and then being resuscitated, citing Kimberly Corman as an example. (Note: As depicted in Final Destination 2 (2003)) Bludworth leaves, expecting his cancer to kill him once Iris's bloodline ends.

Erik persuades Bobby to use the second method by triggering a fatal allergic reaction to nuts and then reviving him. The plan fails when a malfunctioning MRI machine tears out Erik's piercings and pulls him inside; a wheelchair then impales and crushes him (Note: Though Erik was not originally on the list, his attempt to prevent Bobby's death caused Death to target him in retaliation. Furthermore, his very existence remained a byproduct of the ripple effects of Iris's past actions.), while a vending-machine coil launches into Bobby's head. Stefani, Charlie, and Darlene flee to Iris's cabin, hoping to hide Darlene from Death. They crash through the front gate, Stefani's seat belt jams, and the cabin explodes, sending Darlene's RV into the water with Stefani trapped inside. Darlene saves Charlie before being crushed by a lamppost, while Charlie rescues and resuscitates Stefani.

One week later, the father of Charlie's prom date, a physician, explains that Stefani was never clinically dead because she was resuscitated before cardiac arrest. Moments later, a timber-carrying freight train derails nearby, and its cargo fatally crushes the siblings.

== Cast ==
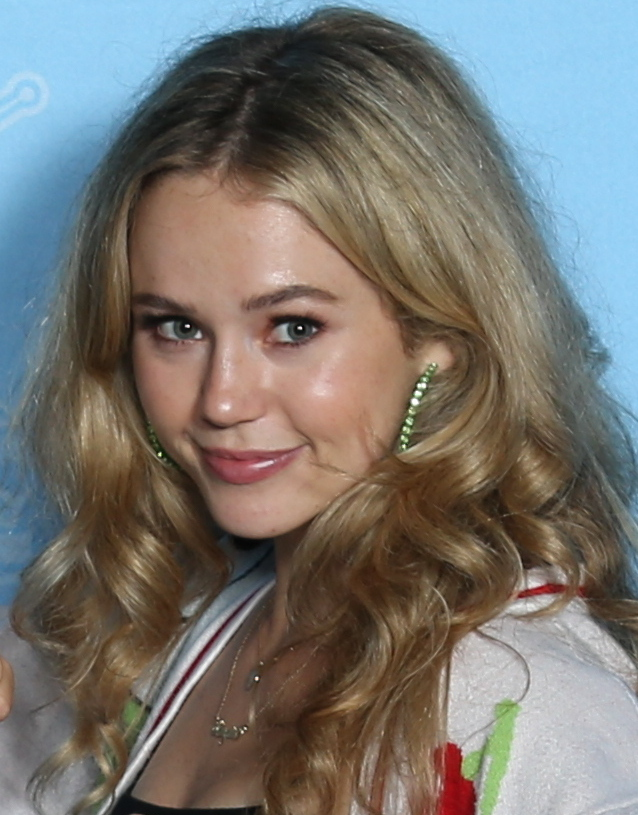
Brec Bassinger plays a young Iris Campbell.

- Kaitlyn Santa Juana as Stefani Reyes, a college student haunted by nightmares of a tower collapse
- Teo Briones as Charlie Reyes, Stefani's younger brother who is a high school senior
- Richard Harmon as Erik Campbell, one of Stefani's cousins who works at a tattoo parlor
- Owen Patrick Joyner as Bobby Campbell, one of Stefani's cousins who has a peanut allergy
- Rya Kihlstedt as Darlene Campbell, Stefani and Charlie's estranged mother and Iris's daughter
- Anna Lore as Julia Campbell, one of Stefani's cousins and a former friend
- Gabrielle Rose as Iris Campbell, Stefani's grandmother who had a premonition in 1969
  - Brec Bassinger as young Iris
- Tony Todd as William Bludworth
  - Jayden Oniah as young Bludworth
- Tinpo Lee as Marty Reyes, Stefani and Charlie's father
- April Telek as Brenda Campbell, Stefani's aunt
- Alex Zahara as Howard Campbell, Stefani's uncle and Iris's son
- Max Lloyd-Jones as Paul Campbell, Iris's husband
- Brenna Llewellyn as Val, Stefani's college roommate

Yvette Ferguson, Mark Brandon, Natasha Burnett, Travis Turner, Bernard Cuffling, Megan Hui and Noah Bromley appear as survivors of the Sky View tower collapse.

== Production ==
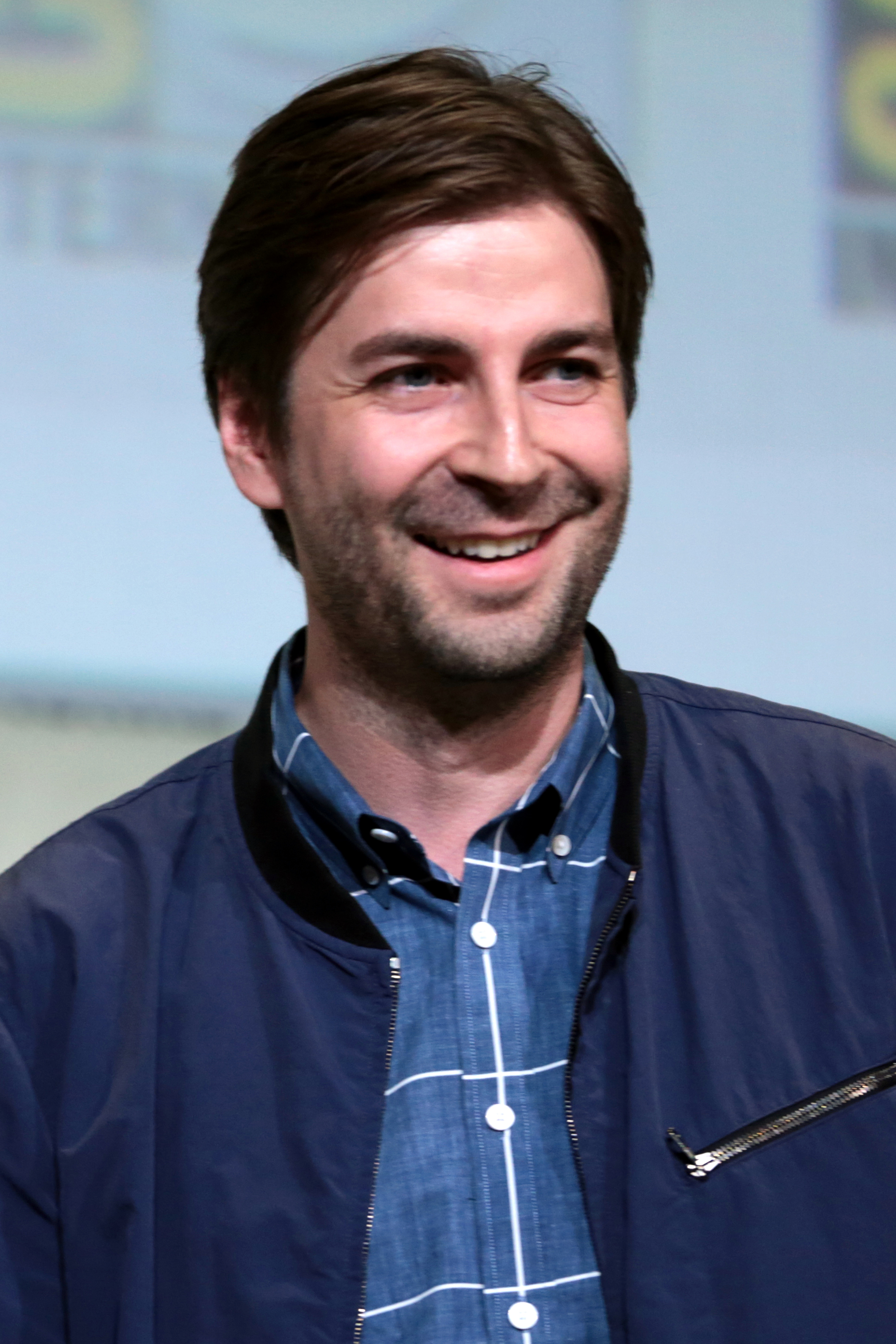
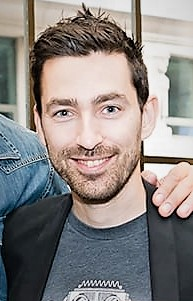
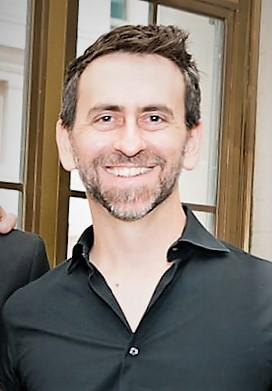
Filmmaker Jon Watts produced and conceived the story for the sixth installment and selected directing duo Zach Lipovsky and Adam Stein from over 200 candidates.

Before the release of Final Destination 5 in 2011, Final Destination series actor Tony Todd said that if the film were successful, two sequels would be filmed back-to-back. In January 2019, New Line Cinema announced a new installment was in development. Patrick Melton and Marcus Dunstan wrote the initial script, described as a reimagining of the franchise; they ultimately received off-screen credit for additional literary material. In March 2020, series producer Craig Perry said the film would be set "in the world of first responders" and feature EMTs, firefighters, and police officers. When asked if it was in the same canon as the previous installments, he said, "Reboot is probably too strong of a word... it makes it sound like they're going to change everything, but it's definitely a Final Destination movie".

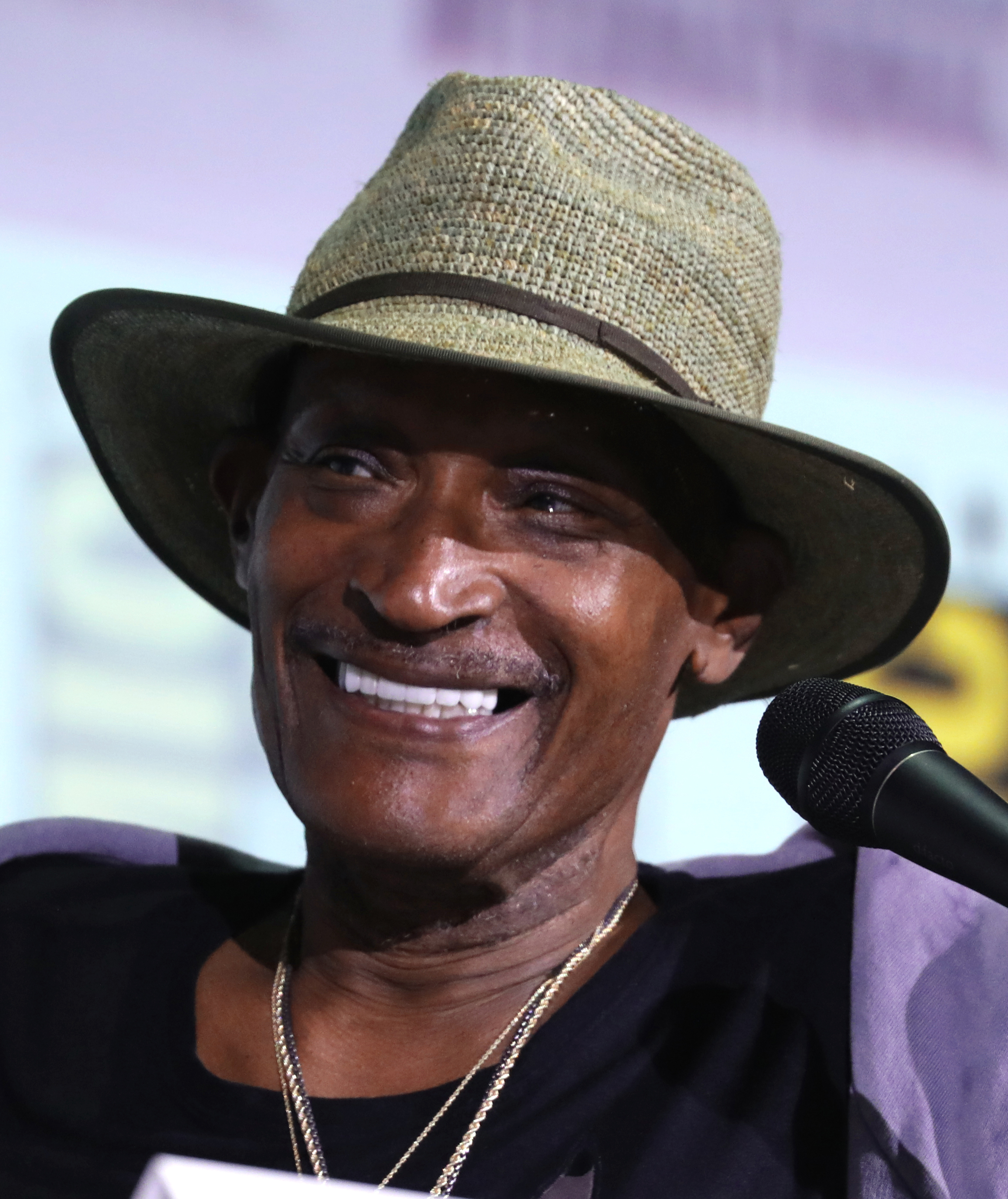
Tony Todd reprised his role as William Bludworth before his death in 2024.

In October 2021, Lori Evans Taylor was reported as the new writer for the film. In January 2022, HBO Max announced it would distribute the film; Jon Watts joined the project as a producer, and Taylor was confirmed to have written the screenplay alongside Guy Busick. In July, Jeffrey Reddick said the film would differ from the franchise's formula. In September that year, Zach Lipovsky and Adam Stein were selected from more than two hundred candidates to direct the film. During a pitch meeting with New Line executives and producers, they staged a mock accident inspired by the series using prerecorded footage and visual effects; they were subsequently hired.

In September 2023, Todd officially signed on to reprise his role as William Bludworth, and the film was said to explore the character's backstory. Despite Todd's death in November 2024, Warner Bros. confirmed that he had completed all of his scenes. The film is dedicated to him.

In March 2024, it was announced that Warner Bros. Pictures would release the film theatrically in 2025. Most of the cast was also revealed. Seventy-one-year-old stuntwoman Yvette Ferguson came out of retirement for a fire stunt in the premonition scene; director Lipovsky described it as a potential world record for the oldest person set on fire on camera. In developing the production design, the directors used circular motifs to suggest Death's ubiquity, beginning with the circular architecture of the Sky View Tower and the penny that undoes it.

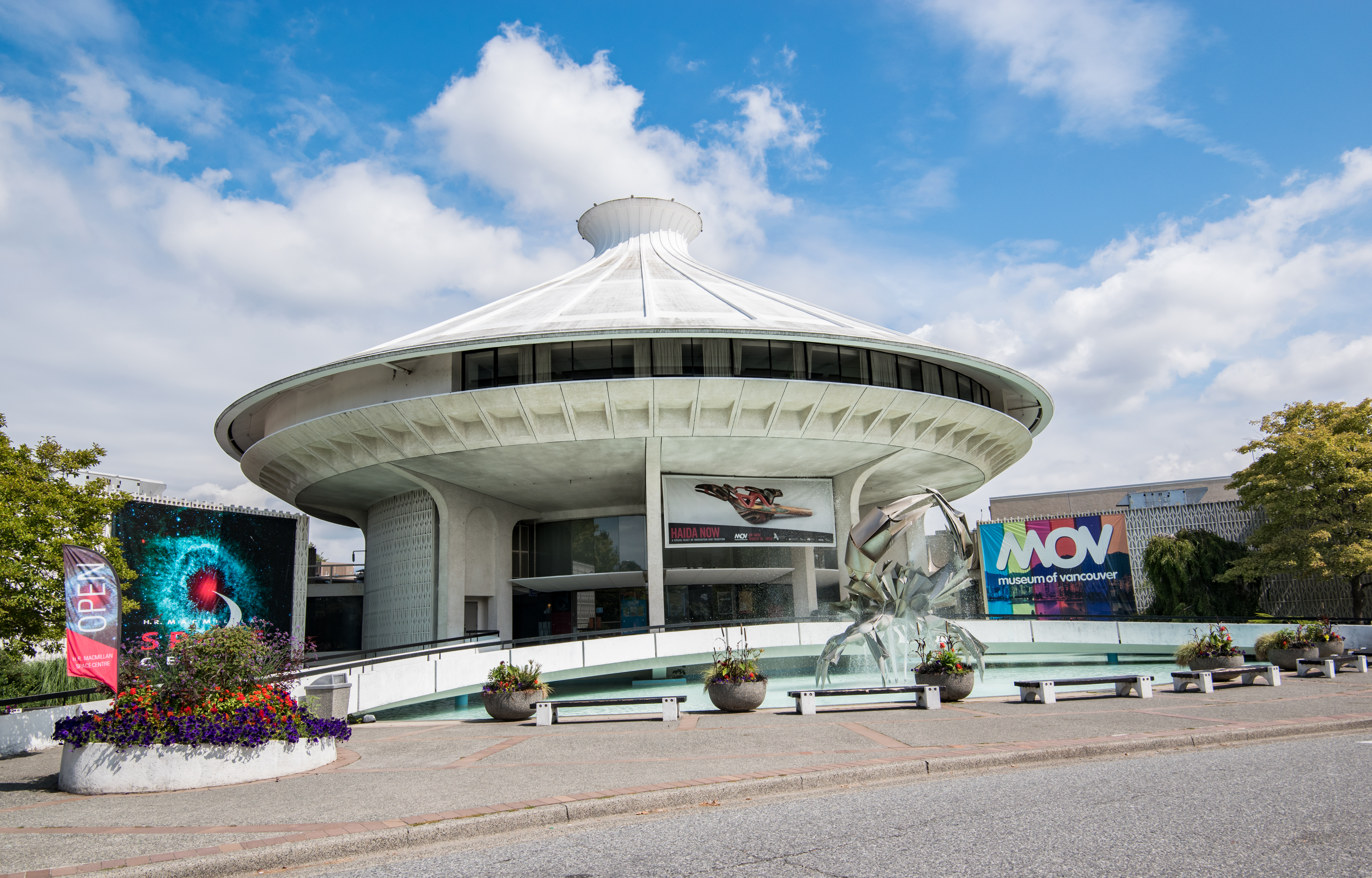
The opening disaster set at the Sky View Tower in the fictional Cloverdale, New York, used the Museum of Vancouver – located in Vancouver, British Columbia – as the tower's base.

Principal photography was scheduled to take place in Vancouver, British Columbia, from July to October 2023, but production was delayed in mid-July due to the SAG-AFTRA strike. With Christian Sebaldt as cinematographer, filming instead took place in Vancouver from March 4 to May 13, 2024. Tim Wynn was hired to compose the score in December 2024.

== Music ==
=== Soundtrack ===
The soundtrack to Final Destination Bloodlines was released by Lakeshore Records on the same day as the film's release. The soundtrack contains 32 tracks composed by Tim Wynn. It is the third Final Destination soundtrack album to be released.

Final Destination Bloodlines (Original Motion Picture Soundtrack)

Film score by Tim Wynn
- Released: May 16, 2025
- Length: 65:58
- Label: Lakeshore Records

Commercial songs from the film, but not on the soundtrack

- "Bad Moon Rising" by Creedence Clearwater Revival
- "Ring of Fire" by Johnny Cash
- "Fallin'", by Connie Francis
- "Shout", by The Isley Brothers
- "Raindrops Keep Fallin' on My Head", by Bobbie Gentry
- "Escape (The Piña Colada Song)", by Rupert Holmes
- "Enter the Grave", by Evile
- "Without You", by Air Supply
- "Stronger (What Doesn't Kill You)", by Kelly Clarkson
- "Spirit in the Sky", by Norman Greenbaum

=== Score ===
The album contains 33 cues composed by Tim Wynn.

Final Destination Bloodlines (Original Motion Picture Soundtrack)
No.	Title	Length
1.	"Bloodlines (End Titles)"	1:45
2.	"Elevator Ride"	1:46
3.	"The MRI"	2:25
4.	"We Can't Give In"	1:46
5.	"Bludworth's Goodbye"	2:45
6.	"Bludworth"	2:43
7.	"Escape to the Compound"	1:36
8.	"Two of Us"	2:30
9.	"The Plan"	1:45
10.	"Waterworld"	2:44
11.	"Seeing is Believing"	1:50
12.	"The Skyview"	1:29
13.	"Lawnmower Man"	2:00
14.	"Drive to Iris"	1:34
15.	"Meet Bludworth"	1:08
16.	"I See You"	1:33
17.	"Decoding Iris' Book"	1:23
18.	"Connecting the Dots"	4:13
19.	"Resurrection"	3:19
20.	"I Screwed Up the Order"	3:03
21.	"Tower of Terror"	2:21
22.	"Tempting Death"	1:43
23.	"Technically You Weren't Dead"	1:15
24.	"Graveyard"	2:02
25.	"Recycling"	1:11
26.	"Your Plan is Nuts"	2:06
27.	"Premonition"	1:01
28.	"The Book"	1:42
29.	"Psycho Grandma"	1:46
30.	"The Collapse"	1:05
31.	"Look After Paco"	1:38
32.	"The Compound"	2:02
33.	"End Credits Suite"	5:13
Total length:		68:22

== Release ==
Final Destination Bloodlines was released in the United States by Warner Bros. Pictures on May 16, 2025, after an international rollout that began two days earlier. The film was shot for IMAX and was released in both IMAX and standard formats. A double-bill special screening was shown in select theaters on May 9 and 10, one week before the film's release, paired with the original 2000 film. A promotional prank screening was held on Mother's Day, with the film being retitled to Love at the Sky View; filmgoers watched the film with their mothers, who were under the assumption it was a romantic comedy.

The film's trailer was released on March 25, 2025, across 65 markets and was available in 44 different language versions. As calculated by WaveMetrix, it garnered 178.7 million views worldwide within the first 24 hours, making it the second most-watched horror film trailer.

On May 19, 2025, the ceiling of the movie theater Cinema Ocho in La Plata, Argentina, collapsed during a screening of the film, injuring one attendee. No deaths were reported.

The film's Philippine premiere marked the highest-grossing opening day for a horror movie in the country until it was surpassed in September by The Conjuring: Last Rites.

=== Home media ===
On June 17, 2025, Warner Bros. Home Entertainment announced the film's digital release, one month after its U.S. theatrical debut. The film was released on Ultra HD Blu-ray, Blu-ray, and DVD on July 22, 2025. It began streaming exclusively on HBO Max starting August 1, 2025.

== Reception ==
=== Box office ===
Final Destination Bloodlines grossed $138.3 million in the United States and Canada and $179.6 million in other territories, for a worldwide total of $317.9 million. In September 2025, Variety reported the film was expected to make a theatrical profit of around $75 million.

In the United States and Canada, Bloodlines was released alongside Hurry Up Tomorrow and was projected to gross $35–40 million from 3,523 theaters in its opening weekend. It made $21 million on its first day, including an estimated $5.5 million from Thursday night previews. It went on to debut to $51.6 million, finishing first at the box office. The film's opening weekend was the biggest for the franchise, even adjusted for inflation, surpassing The Final Destination. The film made $19.3 million in its second weekend (a 63% drop) and $10.8 million in its third, finishing third and fourth, respectively.

In the Philippines, a strong market for horror films, Final Destination Bloodlines recorded the second-highest opening weekend for a horror film after Insidious: The Red Door and set the record for the highest-grossing opening weekend of 2025, the highest-grossing opening weekend for an R-16 film, and the highest-grossing horror film of all time in that market. According to Google, Final Destination Bloodlines was the most searched-for film in the Philippines for 2025.

=== Critical response ===
The film was the best-reviewed installment in the franchise. On the review aggregator website Rotten Tomatoes, 92% of 233 critics' reviews are positive, with an average rating of 7.2/10. The website's consensus reads: "Adding some surprising emotional layers onto the ghoulish bones of Final Destination's mythology, Bloodlines ingeniously executes grisly set pieces with precision and turns impending doom into outrageous fun." Metacritic, which uses a weighted average, assigned the film a score of 73 out of 100, based on 35 critics, indicating "generally favorable" reviews. Audiences polled by CinemaScore gave the film an average grade of B+ on an A+ to F scale, while PostTrak respondents gave it an average four out of five stars, with 69% saying they would definitely recommend it.

Todd Gilchrist of Variety called the film "clever, unpredictable and fun" and praised Todd's performance as "a tender tribute to the horror luminary and retroactive connective tissue between the franchise's disparate chapters". Frank Scheck of The Hollywood Reporter wrote that the film "gives its audiences exactly what they expect. Namely, a series of ingeniously designed, diabolical Rube Goldberg–style fatalities that are mostly so within the realm of possibility that you'll find yourself crossing the street very carefully after you leave the theater." He also praised Todd's appearance as "a poignant reminder that in real life, as in these movies, death comes for everybody". John Lui of The Straits Times gave the film 4 out of 5 stars, writing, "Co-directors Zach Lipovsky and Adam Stein [...] do a good job of maintaining the grisly tenor of the movies while nudging it out of its comfort zone, that of teens and young adults coming to grief in freak accidents."

=== Accolades ===
Award	Date of ceremony	Category	Nominee(s)	Result	Ref.
Astra Midseason Movie Awards	July 3, 2025	Best Horror	Final Destination Bloodlines	Nominated	
Fangoria Chainsaw Awards	October 19, 2025	Best Wide Release	Final Destination Bloodlines	Nominated	
Directors Guild of Canada	November 8, 2025	Best Direction in a Feature Film	Zach Lipovsky, Adam Stein	Won	
Astra Film Awards	January 9, 2026	Best Horror or Thriller Feature	Final Destination Bloodlines	Nominated	
Saturn Awards	March 8, 2026	Best Horror Film	Final Destination Bloodlines	Nominated	

== Sequel ==
Stein said the narrative potential remains open-ended: "Death's work is never done. There are always more scores to settle." He acknowledged, though, that the creative process can take several years. Perry also expressed openness to continuing the franchise, noting that Bloodlines has expanded the series' creative flexibility.

On August 8, 2025, it was announced that a seventh film was in development, with Taylor returning to write the script. In October 2025, it was announced that Michiel Blanchart would direct the film. On April 14, 2026, Warner Bros. revealed that the seventh film was scheduled to be released on May 12, 2028.
