= Final Destination 5 =

2011 American supernatural horror film

- Theatrical release poster
- Directed by: Steven Quale
- Written by: Eric Heisserer
- Based on: Characters by Jeffrey Reddick
- Produced by: Craig Perry; Warren Zide
- Starring: Nicholas D'Agosto; Emma Bell; Miles Fisher; Arlen Escarpeta; David Koechner; Tony Todd
- Cinematography: Brian Pearson
- Edited by: Eric Sears
- Music by: Brian Tyler
- Production companies: New Line Cinema; Practical Pictures; Zide/Perry Productions
- Distributed by: Warner Bros. Pictures
- Release dates: August 4, 2011 (Fantasia); August 12, 2011 (United States)
- Running time: 91 minutes
- Country: United States
- Language: English
- Budget: $40 million
- Box office: $157.9 million

Final Destination 5 is a 2011 American supernatural horror film directed by Steven Quale and written by Eric Heisserer. It is the fifth installment in the Final Destination film series. The film stars Nicholas D'Agosto as a young man who has a premonition about a suspension bridge collapsing, and saves a group of people from Death, only to learn that they cannot escape its plan. Emma Bell, Miles Fisher, Arlen Escarpeta, David Koechner, and Tony Todd star in supporting roles.

Despite The Final Destination (2009) being announced as the final film in the franchise, that film's financial success led to the development of a fifth installment, which began in 2010. Filming took place in Vancouver, as with the first three installments. As of 2025, it is the latest film in the franchise to be shot and presented in 3D.

Final Destination 5 was theatrically released on August 12, 2011, and on DVD on December 27, 2011, by Warner Bros. Pictures and New Line Cinema. The film received mixed reviews from critics and grossed $157 million worldwide, becoming – as of April 2026 – the third highest-grossing film in the franchise. A sixth film, Final Destination Bloodlines, was released in May 2025.

== Plot ==
Office worker Sam Lawton is heading to a company retreat with his colleagues. While crossing the North Bay Bridge, he has a premonition of the bridge collapsing due to high winds, killing everyone except for his ex-girlfriend Molly Harper. He panics and convinces Molly, his friend and boss Peter Friedkin, Peter's girlfriend Candice Hooper, his manager Dennis Lapman, factory manager Nathan Sears and colleagues Olivia Castle and Isaac Palmer to get off the bridge. Afterwards, the bridge collapses. FBI agent Jim Block suspects Sam of foul play. Still, Sam is cleared when Block's colleague determines the collapse was not man-made. Sam and his colleagues also meet mortician William Bludworth, who warns them that "Death doesn't like to be cheated".

Later, Candice dies from a freak accident during gymnastics practice, causing Peter to become unstable. Following Candice's death, womanizer Isaac is fatally crushed by a Budai statue during a spa treatment, after a fire breaks out, causing the shelf holding the statue to break and fall on his head. Present at the aftermath of both deaths, Bludworth tells them that Death is killing them because they survived a disaster they were supposed to die in, creating "wrinkles in reality". Molly, however, was meant to survive in the collapse and thus was not a part of Death's plan that threatened the other survivors. To survive, they must kill someone to steal their remaining lifespan. They later failed to save Olivia when she falls through a window after a malfunctioning laser eye surgery machine mutilates her right eye. Sam realizes that the survivors are dying in the order they would have died in the bridge collapse and discovers that Nathan is next.

During a workplace argument, Nathan accidentally kills his coworker Roy Carson. When the other survivors hear this, they deduce that Nathan must have stolen Roy's lifespan. Sam realizes that Dennis would be next on the list when, suddenly, a machine launches a wrench into Dennis' face, killing him. That evening, Sam and Molly rekindle their relationship at a restaurant. However, they are interrupted by Peter, who seeks to steal Molly's lifespan, resenting her for being destined to survive the collapse. Agent Block intervenes but is shot by Peter, who steals his lifespan. Despite this, Peter tries to kill Molly to eliminate witnesses but is saved by Sam, who impales and kills Peter with a meat spit. After Peter's gun misfires and misses Sam, he concludes that Peter stole Block's lifespan.

Two weeks later, Sam and Molly board a plane to Paris and witness six high school students and a teacher being escorted out, revealing that it is Volée Airlines Flight 180. Upon takeoff, Sam overhears that one of the students panicked after having a vision of the plane exploding, resulting in their removal. (Note: As depicted in Final Destination (2000)) Sam and Molly realize it is too late as the plane explodes, killing everyone aboard. Meanwhile, at a memorial for Roy, Nathan learns from a co-worker that Roy had an undiagnosed brain aneurysm and that he could have died at any moment if he had lived. As Nathan realizes the implications, the landing gear from Flight 180 crashes through the roof and crushes him to death.

== Cast ==
- Nicholas D'Agosto as Sam Lawton
- Emma Bell as Molly Harper
- Miles Fisher as Peter Friedkin
- Ellen Wroe as Candice Hooper
- Jacqueline MacInnes Wood as Olivia Castle
- P. J. Byrne as Isaac Palmer
- Arlen Escarpeta as Nathan Sears
- David Koechner as Dennis Lapman
- Courtney B. Vance as Agent Jim Block
- Tony Todd as William Bludworth
- Brent Stait as Roy Carson
- Roman Podhora as John
- Jasmin Dring as Cho
- Barclay Hope as Dr. Leonetti
- Chasty Ballesteros as spa receptionist
- Mike Dopud as chef

Additionally, archive footage from the production of the original 2000 film features Devon Sawa as Alex Browning.

== Production ==
=== Development ===
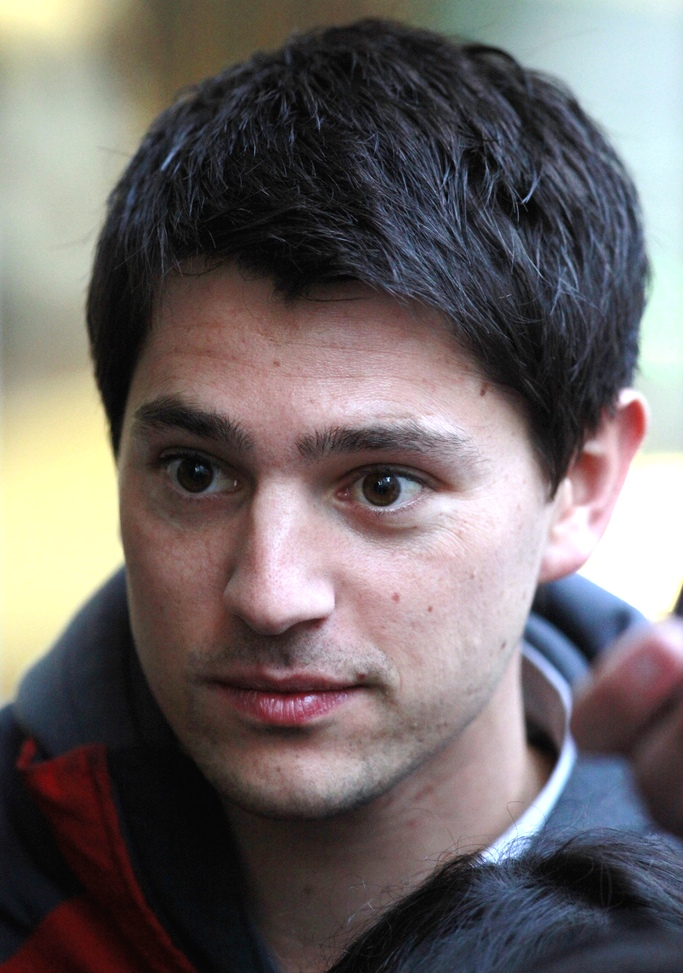
D'Agosto while filming Final Destination 5 in Vancouver, October 2010

Alan Horn, the head of Warner Bros., confirmed at ShoWest in March 2010 that Final Destination 5 was in the works. Producer Craig Perry later added that the film would be shot in 3D. Eric Heisserer was announced as screenwriter in April 2010. The studio initially picked August 26, 2011, as the release date, but later changed it to August 12, 2011. In June 2010, New Line Cinema announced that Steven Quale would direct, and that the movie would be renamed 5nal Destination. The name change was reversed only a few months later.

=== Writing ===
According to Heisserer, Final Destination 5 was always meant to be a prequel, set before the first film; the idea having come from franchise producer Craig Perry. Heisserer said that one major problem he encountered while writing the film was coming up with good death sequences, believing that managing to do so in the world of Final Destination is "ridiculously hard". The inspiration for Olivia Castle's death sequence involving LASIK eye surgery came after his wife underwent the same type of surgery.

=== Casting ===
In August 2010, actor and musician Miles Fisher was the first to be cast in the film as Peter Friedkin. Fisher had appeared in numerous short films and in a small role in the comedy film Superhero Movie (2008). Fisher said during an interview that "I've done a little bit of television and a little bit of film, but 3D is almost an entirely different sport." Three days after Fisher's casting, Arlen Escarpeta was cast in the film as Nathan Sears. Escarpeta explained that "I think what they're going to do really, really well this time around, they're going to go back—the story, the plot, a lot of stuff is really going to matter, I think the last movie it was just death. It was death, death, death, which is fine because that's what people want to see. But this time we're going to give them a little bit of everything – good story, great director—it's going to be good."

In late August 2010, Nicholas D'Agosto was cast to portray the film's main visionary, Sam Lawton. D'Agosto had recently starred in the 2007 comedy film Rocket Science before he was cast in the film after his appearance in Fired Up! since 2009. Along with D'Agosto, newcomer actress Ellen Wroe joined the cast as Candice Hooper. One day later, Tony Todd, who portrayed William Bludworth from the first two installments, returned to join the film's cast after not appearing in the fourth film due to scheduling commitments to work on Transformers: Revenge of the Fallen. On August 30, 2010, the production hired David Koechner and P. J. Byrne to join the cast. Koechner portrays the characters' company executive Dennis Lapman while Byrne, after his appearance in Dinner for Schmucks, portrays Isaac Palmer. Emma Bell, who made her major film debut appearance in the 2010 thriller film Frozen, was cast on September 2 to co-lead with D'Agosto as Molly Harper. In mid-September, both Courtney B. Vance and Jacqueline MacInnes Wood are the last main cast members to join the film. Law & Order: Criminal Intent's Vance plays FBI agent Jim Block while Wood, who is starring as Steffy Forrester in the soap opera The Bold and the Beautiful, portrays co-worker Olivia Castle.

At the end of the film, archive footage from the original Final Destination film is used to feature Devon Sawa as Alex Browning, thus revealing that Final Destination 5 is a prequel in the franchise. However, Sawa revealed that while he signed a contract when he did the first film that stipulated that the studio owned the footage and could use it in the future, he assumed they meant its use for press purposes, and he was never paid "a cent" for the use of footage of him in the fifth film. Nobody involved with the film informed him of his appearance when he was invited to the premiere. He nonetheless loved the film and expressed his praise for the filmmakers, indicating he held no grudges against them.

=== Filming ===
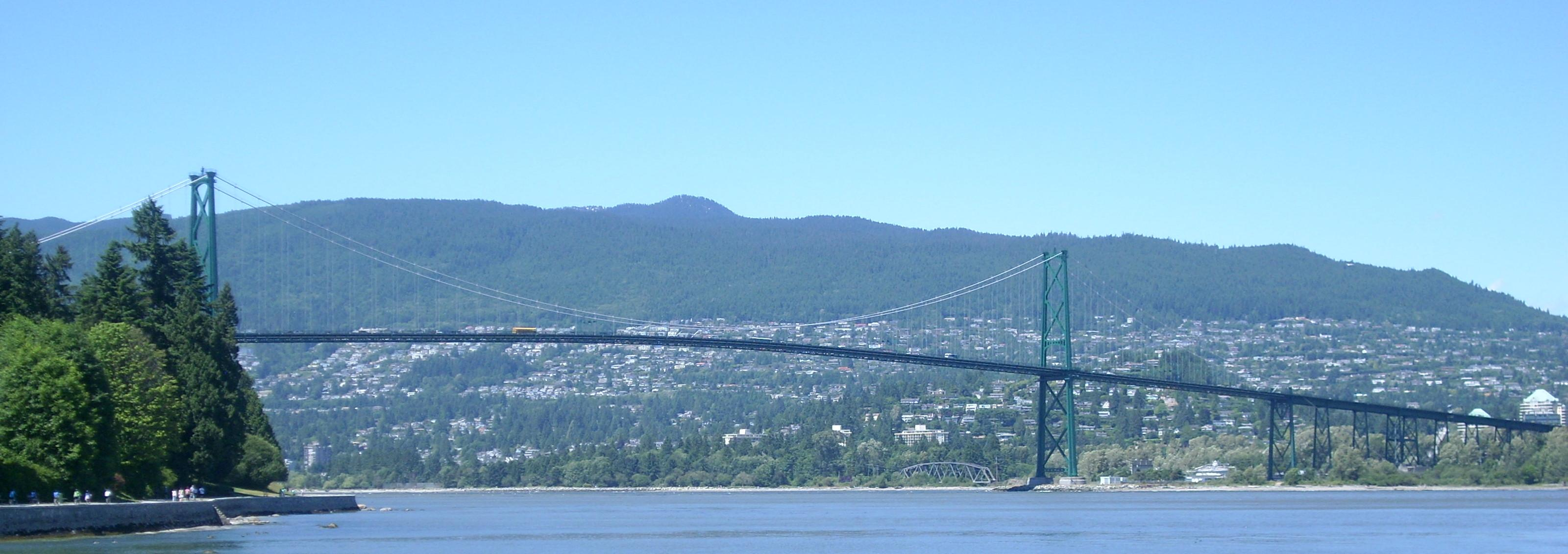
The opening scene featuring the North Bay Bridge collapse in North Bay, New York, was filmed on the Lions Gate Bridge in Vancouver, British Columbia, and using two scale representations of the bridge.

Location filming returned to Vancouver, where parts of the first three films were shot. Principal photography took place between September 13 and December 14, 2010. Producers stated that this installment would be darker and more suspenseful in the style of the original film. Final Destination 3 star Chelan Simmons said the opening scene would be filmed on the Lions Gate Bridge in Vancouver. The film was shot with the then-newly released Arri Alexa digital camera.

== Music ==
=== Soundtrack ===
The soundtrack to Final Destination 5 was released on August 16, 2011, by Varèse Sarabande, four days after the release of the film. The soundtrack contains 19 tracks composed by Brian Tyler, music composer of The Final Destination. Miles Fisher also released a tie-in video for his single "New Romance" which features the key actors in the film in a Saved by the Bell parody in which most are killed in freak accidents, in keeping with the series.

Final Destination 5 (Original Motion Picture Soundtrack)

Film score by Brian Tyler
- Released: August 16, 2011
- Length: 68:58
- Label: Varèse Sarabande

Brian Tyler soundtrack chronology
| Fast Five: Original Motion Picture Score (2011) | Final Destination 5 (Original Motion Picture Soundtrack) (2011) | Brake (Original Motion Picture Soundtrack) (2012) |

Commercial songs from the film, but not on the soundtrack

- "I Will Buy You a New Life" by Everclear
- "Successful Leader" by Jeff Tymoschuk
- "Ballroom" and "Girl on the Run" by Terry Poison
- "Dust in the Wind" by Kansas
- "Walk Like Water" by Cliff P. deMarks Jr.
- "Me, Myself and I" by Excellence
- "The Orbiting Suns" by Jens Gad
- "If You Want Blood (You've Got It)" by AC/DC

=== Score ===
1. "Main Title" (3:47)
2. "Fates Bridge" (6:31)
3. "Repercussions" (4:06)
4. "Kill or Be Killed" (4:30)
5. "Cheating Death" (2:13)
6. "Bludworth" (2:43)
7. "Death's Work" (10:12)
8. "Olivia" (1:35)
9. "Eye Can't See No Good" (4:16)
10. "The Gift Certificate" (2:50)
11. "Meet the Gang" (1:10)
12. "Hook in Mouth" (2:09)
13. "Isaac's Got a Point" (2:08)
14. "Recognition" (0:59)
15. "Mystery" (2:47)
16. "Bend Over Backwards" (4:38)
17. "The Order of Death" (7:20)
18. "Plans Within Plans" (3:45)
19. "Infinite Finale" (1:31)

== Release ==
=== Marketing ===
The Advertising Standards Authority (ASA) in the UK ruled that the original theatrical poster, which had been used on buses and trains during the summer, "was likely to cause fear and undue distress to children". It ruled that the advert must not appear in the original form again.

Warner Bros. countered by stating that the poster "accurately reflected the content of the film in an appropriate manner without causing excessive fear or distress". They also added that the poster's dark grey and black colors were "unlikely to engage the attention of young children", and that the "surreal" image did not feature people, blood, or display any real-life violence.

The ASA, which had received 13 complaints, with three stating that their children (aged between 1 and 3) had been upset, ruled "We considered the image was likely to catch the attention of children, especially because it was shown on a poster on the Underground, where it was an untargeted medium. Because very young children might view this ad depicting violence, it was likely to cause fear and undue distress to children."

=== Box office ===
Final Destination 5 ranked #3 at the weekend box office with $18.4 million behind Rise of the Planet of the Apes ($27.5 million), which held the top spot for two weeks, and The Help ($25.5 million). It was also the third biggest Final Destination opening to date behind 2009's The Final Destination ($27.4 million) and 2006's Final Destination 3 ($19.1 million). Final Destination 5 grossed $42.6 million domestically, and $115.3 million internationally, for a worldwide total of $157.9 million becoming the third highest-grossing film in the franchise, behind The Final Destination and Final Destination Bloodlines.

=== Home media ===
Final Destination 5 was released on DVD and Blu-ray Disc on December 27, 2011. The Blu-ray Disc comes in two forms: the movie only edition and the Blu-ray Disc/DVD/UltraViolet edition. A Blu-ray 3D edition was released exclusively through Best Buy. The film was released in the UK on December 26, 2011; however, only the special edition Blu-ray Disc contained the 3D cut of the film. An UltraViolet copy was available in all formats. The film grossed $10.5 million in home sales.

Before the film appeared in theaters, Fisher released a music video. Starring the main cast of Final Destination 5 and featuring Fisher's original song "New Romance", the video parodied the 1990s sitcom Saved by the Bell and included a clue to the plot of the film. Fisher, a fan of the show, and video director Dave Green watched every episode, and contemporary shows like Boy Meets World and Clarissa Explains It All. "We thought, 'Gosh wouldn't it be fun and subversive to have Final Destination-type deaths in this safe, [sitcom] world?'" Fisher, who plays a Zack Morris-type character, said. He joked, "I basically have always been looking for a way to dance with Kelly Kapowski my whole life".

== Reception ==
=== Critical response ===
Review aggregator Rotten Tomatoes reports that 64% of 137 critic reviews are positive, and the average rating as 5.9 out of 10. The site's critical consensus reads, "It's still only for the gore-thirsty faithful, but Final Destination 5 represents a surprising return to form for the franchise." Metacritic, which assigns a weighted score, gives the film a score of 50 out of 100, based on 24 critics, indicating "mixed or average reviews". It was the highest-rated film of the franchise on both sites before being overtaken by its successor. Audiences polled by CinemaScore gave the film an average grade of B+ on an A+ to F scale.

Richard Roeper stated in his review "From the opening credits to the final kill this film displays a great use of 3D." Todd Gilchrist of Boxoffice Magazine has declared the film in his review for being "the best 3D horror movie ever made." He described Final Destination 5 as "a clean, glossy thriller shot in native 3D (not post-conversion) that maximizes the technology without straining the audience's credulity or their constitutions." He also stated "Calling anything the 'best 3D horror film' has the ring of crowning the world's tallest midget, but Quale uses 3D almost shockingly well." In a review for Toronto.com, Linda Barnard has stated "this could be a case where the 3D-shot movie is worth the extra few bucks to see".

The visual effects were praised for improving on the CGI from the previous installment. Betty Jo Tucker of ReelTalk Movie Reviews said in her review "The film boasts some of the best visual effects ever, especially the bridge-crumbling sequence at the beginning of the film." In his review of Final Destination 5, Roger Ebert said "[...] the special effects do an excellent job of beheading, incinerating, vivisecting, squishing and so on." "Final Destination 5 contain some of the most fun effects ever seen that purely enhance the thrills and bloody spills, rather than detract from them," stated Lisa Giles-Keddie from uk.real.com.

The death scenes in the film have been praised as being suspenseful, creative, and shocking. Boxoffice Magazine said in praise, "viewers connect to both the relatable pain of everyday injury and the gory gratification of a well-constructed, larger-than-life set piece." NJ.com opined, "Admitted, there is a certain inventiveness to the way director Steven Quale stages the violence." San Francisco Chronicle said that the characters are "killed in gruesome and spectacular ways". The gymnastic set piece has been praised as "anxiety-filled", "a beautiful example of successful comic suspense", "Hitchcockian edge-of-your-seat suspense", and "inventively grotesque". Film.com stated in their review "The subsequent deaths are hit-or-miss, but they all show some creative spark. Quale sets them up like a cross between a joke and a magic trick, carefully establishing crucial details."

The opening bridge collapse has garnered considerable critical acclaim, with many stating it as being on par with the pile-up sequence from Final Destination 2. It has been said to be "one of the single best sequences of any film all year" by Boxoffice Magazine. Uk.real.com stated that the opening bridge collapse sequence is "beautifully directed and choreographed". Eric D. Snider has stated in his review for Film.com that "The opening premonition is nerve-janglingly effective." New York Post called the bridge collapse sequence "spectacular", and Daily News deemed it "terrifying". USA Today commented on the sequence, saying "The effect is terrific and reminiscent of the bridge destruction from Mission: Impossible III." Betsy Sharkey, a Los Angeles Times film critic stated in her negative review "I will say, the bus, and the bridge it must cross, does make for a pretty incredible wham-bam opening sequence," and further added "The big crumble is a stunner of an opener." In a review for MSN.com, Kat Murphy said "the fifth chapter starts out with a slambang catastrophe", then stated that the bridge collapse is "skillfully orchestrated", and "this sequence is actually enhanced by 3D: Holes in the disintegrating bridge seem to pull the gaze down—dizzyingly—to the river below, and jagged camera angles on hanging railings and sliding debris muddle our sense of what's up, what's down." Kirk Honeycutt of The Hollywood Reporter praised "This film's opening sequence is undeniably spectacular." Aaron Hillis from The Village Voice called the bridge collapse "breathtakingly staged". The Advocate stated that "Director Steve Quale and writer Heisserer stage the bridge's collapse in swift but exacting detail." The Austin Chronicle said the bridge collapse sequence is "spectacularly gruesome".

In 2017, John Squires, writing for Bloody Disgusting, gave five reasons as to why Final Destination 5 is the franchise's best sequel, highlighting the opening sequence, the inventive death scenes, the level of gore in the film, the new mythology to defeat Death and the ending encompassing scenes from the first film.

== Sequel ==
In early 2011, Tony Todd said in an interview with Dread Central that if Final Destination 5 was a success at the box office, then two sequels would be filmed back-to-back. On August 23, when asked whether he would be directing a sequel, Steven Quale elaborated: "Who knows. Never say never. I mean, it'll be up to the fans. We'll see how this one performs internationally, and if it makes as much money as the fourth one, I'm sure Warner Brothers will want to make another one".

In January 2019, a new installment was announced to be in development, from Warner Bros. Pictures and New Line Cinema. Patrick Melton and Marcus Dunstan would write the script, with the plot described as a "re-imagining" of the franchise. In August, Devon Sawa expressed interest in returning to the franchise in the reboot.

In March 2020, the film was revealed to be set in the same canon as the first five films and would focus on first responders, with series producer Craig Perry stating: "We're toying with having it take place in the world of first responders: EMTs, firemen, and police. These people deal with death on the front lines every day and make choices that can cause people to live or die. We rely on their good judgment, expertise, and calm demeanor. So why not put those people in the nightmare situation where every choice can bring about life and death – but now for themselves? We're thinking that world might be an interesting way into a Final Destination movie, and one which can also generate unique set pieces in a very credible way".

Later in October, series creator Jeffrey Reddick confirmed that a sixth film had been in the works prior to the COVID-19 pandemic.
