= Final Destination 3 =

2006 American supernatural horror film

- Theatrical release poster
- Directed by: James Wong
- Written by: Glen Morgan; James Wong
- Based on: Characters by Jeffrey Reddick
- Produced by: Glen Morgan; James Wong; Craig Perry; Warren Zide
- Starring: Mary Elizabeth Winstead; Ryan Merriman
- Cinematography: Robert McLachlan
- Edited by: Chris G. Willingham
- Music by: Shirley Walker
- Production companies: Hard Eight Pictures; Practical Pictures; Matinee Pictures; Zide/Perry Productions
- Distributed by: New Line Cinema
- Release dates: February 2, 2006 (Grauman's Chinese Theatre); February 10, 2006 (United States)
- Running time: 93 minutes
- Country: United States
- Language: English
- Budget: $25 million
- Box office: $118.9 million

Final Destination 3 is a 2006 American supernatural horror film produced and directed by James Wong, who co-wrote it with Glen Morgan. It is a standalone sequel to Final Destination 2 (2003) and the third installment in the Final Destination film series. It stars Mary Elizabeth Winstead and Ryan Merriman, and takes place six years after the first film. Winstead plays Wendy Christensen, a high school graduate who has a premonition that a roller coaster she and her classmates are riding will derail. Although she saves some of them, Death begins hunting the survivors. Upon realizing that photographs she took at the attraction contain clues about the deaths, Wendy, alongside survivor and friend Kevin Fischer (Merriman), tries to use this knowledge to save the rest of the survivors and stop Death's scheme.

The film's development began shortly after the release of Final Destination 2; Jeffrey Reddick, creator of the franchise and a co-writer of the first two films, did not return. Unlike the second film, which was a direct sequel to the first, the producers envisioned Final Destination 3 as a standalone film. The idea of featuring a roller coaster derailment as the opening-scene disaster came from New Line Cinema executive Richard Bryner. From the beginning, Wong and Morgan saw control as a major theme in the film. Casting began in March 2005 and concluded in April. Like the previous two installments, it was filmed in Vancouver, Canada. The first two weeks of the three-month shoot were spent filming the scenes involving the roller coaster derailing.

Following its premiere at Grauman's Chinese Theatre on February 2, 2006, the film was released in cinemas in the United States on February 10, 2006. A special-edition DVD, released on July 25, 2006, includes a feature called "Choose Their Fate", which acts as an interactive film, allowing viewers to make decisions at specific points during the film that alter the course of the story.

Final Destination 3 received mixed reviews from critics. The film was a financial success and, with box office receipts of nearly $118 million, the highest-grossing installment in the franchise at the time. A fourth film, The Final Destination, was released in August 2009.

== Plot ==
High school student Wendy Christensen visits an amusement park in Pennsylvania with her boyfriend Jason Wise, Jason's best friend Kevin Fischer, his girlfriend Carrie Dreyer, and their classmates to celebrate their graduation. As they board the Devil's Flight roller coaster, Wendy has a premonition of a chain reaction causing the roller coaster to derail, killing everyone. She convinces Kevin, along with best friends Ashley Freund and Ashlyn Halperin, alumnus Frankie Cheeks, athlete Lewis Romero, and goth couple Ian McKinley and Erin Ulmer, to leave but fails to save Jason and Carrie, who are killed by the subsequent derailment.

Weeks later, Kevin tells Wendy of his discovery of a visionary, Alex Browning, and six other people from Browning's high school who escaped the Flight 180 explosion, and as a result, Death came after them in the order they would have died in the blast. (Note: As depicted in Final Destination (2000)) After Ashley and Ashlyn are killed when they were burned alive in their tanning beds and having been sensing Death's presence since the derailment, Wendy conducts her own research relating to Death, including learning about the U.S. Route 23 pile-up, which took place one year after Flight 180. (Note: As depicted in Final Destination 2 (2003)) After learning of the parallel disasters, Wendy and Kevin set off to save the other survivors using clues about their fated deaths present in the photographs Wendy took of them at the amusement park. While Wendy and Kevin attempt to determine how Frankie dies, his head is sliced by an engine fan from Kevin's truck, in which they were trapped. The next day, Lewis is killed when a weight machine crushes his head at the school gym. As they attempt to save Ian and Erin, who are working at a hardware store, Wendy manages to save Ian from falling stakes, but Death then skips to Erin, who falls on a nail gun, which shoots nails into her head.

While identifying the next two survivors from the photographs, Wendy realizes they are her sister Julie and one of her friends, prompting Wendy and Kevin to rush to the local tricentennial fair to save them. Kevin saves Julie from being impaled on a harrow, but when Wendy tries to question her sister about the next person in line to die, an airborne flagpole fatally impales Julie's friend Perry Malinowski. After Wendy saves Kevin from an exploding propane canister, the trio is confronted by a grief-stricken Ian, who blames Wendy for Erin's death. An unstable cart of fireworks blasts in Wendy's direction, which she, Kevin, and Julie barely evade. It later hits a cherry picker, causing it to collapse on Ian, bisecting him.

Five months later, Wendy experiences more omens while riding a subway train with her roommate Laura and her friend Sean. As Wendy is about to disembark, she suddenly reunites with Julie and Kevin, who had also boarded the train. Wendy receives another premonition that the train will crash, killing everyone on board. Panicked, the remaining survivors attempt to stop the train as it seemingly crashes off-screen.

== Cast ==
- Mary Elizabeth Winstead as Wendy Christensen
- Ryan Merriman as Kevin Fischer
- Kris Lemche as Ian McKinley
- Alexz Johnson as Erin Ulmer
- Sam Easton as Frankie Cheeks
- Jesse Moss as Jason Wise
- Gina Holden as Carrie Dreyer
- Texas Battle as Lewis Romero
- Chelan Simmons as Ashley Freund
- Crystal Lowe as Ashlyn Halperin
- Amanda Crew as Julie Christensen
- Maggie Ma as Perry Malinowski
- Ecstasia Sanders as Amber Regan
- Patrick Gallagher as Colquitt
- Andrew Francis as Payton
- Cory Monteith as Kahill
- Dustin Milligan as Marcus
- Tony Todd as the Devil (voice) / subway train conductor (voice)
- Agam Darshi as Laura
- Dylan Basile as Sean

== Production ==
=== Development ===
Final Destination 3 was originally the last part of a trilogy and had been in development since the release of Final Destination 2. Franchise creator Jeffrey Reddick and one of the co-writers of the first two films did not return for the third installment. Director James Wong said that unlike the second film, which was closely tied to the first Final Destination and continued its story, the producers always envisioned Final Destination 3 as a stand-alone sequel featuring new characters. He said: [W]e really felt that the idea of Final Destination, or the fact that Death can visit you and you can cheat death ... could happen to anyone." By not using characters from the first film, the producers could use a new plot, with new characters who would be unaware of what was happening to them and react accordingly.

The film's original title, Cheating Death: Final Destination 3, changed during development. Craig Perry and Warren Zide's Zide/Perry Productions, and Wong and Glen Morgan's own Hard Eight Pictures that co-produced Final Destination returned to produce Final Destination 3 with Practical Pictures and Manitee Pictures. Initially, the film was to be filmed in 3D, but this was abandoned. Morgan said it was for financial reasons and because he believed fire and blood effects would not be shown properly through the red filters of anaglyph 3D systems.

Wong said that the idea of using a roller coaster derailment as the opening-scene disaster came from New Line Cinema executive Richard Bryner and was not inspired by the Big Thunder Mountain Railroad roller coaster incident at Disneyland in 2003, in which a derailment occurred that fatally crushed a rider. Morgan said he searched the aisles of a store on Sunset Boulevard for days for inspiration for Erin's hardware-store death. Loss of control is a major theme he and Wong had envisioned for the film from the very beginning; both Wendy, who is afraid of losing control, and the roller coaster exemplify this. He said psychologists have confirmed that one reason some people are afraid of riding a roller coaster is that they have no control over it and what happens to them.

=== Casting ===
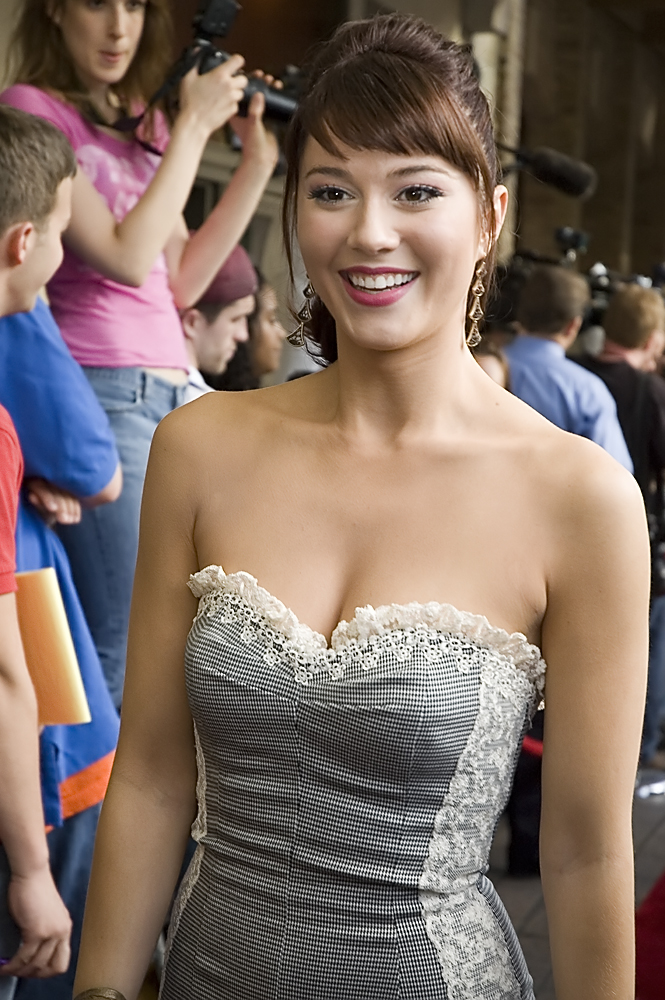
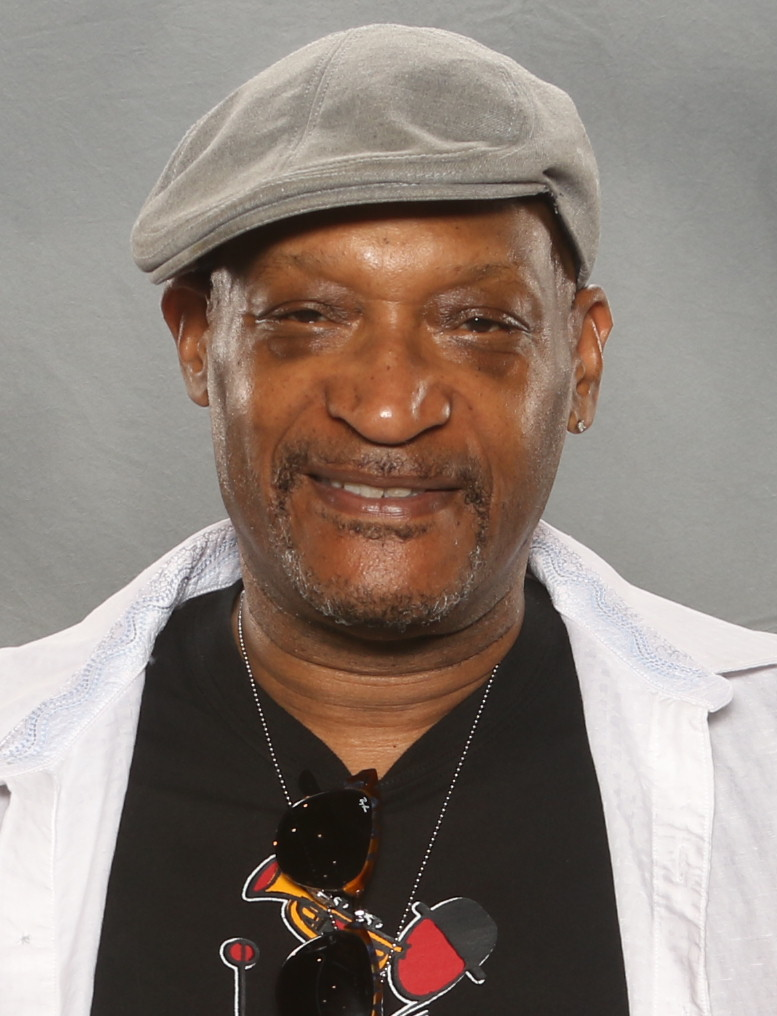
Mary Elizabeth Winstead (left) portrayed the film's visionary, Wendy Christensen; Winstead had previously auditioned for Final Destination 2. Tony Todd (right), who had previously appeared as William Bludworth in the first two films, came back in a voice only role as the Devil's statue and the subway conductor.

During the casting process, Wong sought actors who could portray the main characters as heroic individuals with realistic qualities. Perry echoed this sentiment, saying that for the Wendy and Kevin characters they looked for actors who "had the charisma of movie stars, but weren't so ridiculously rarefied that you couldn't feel like you might know them". They took great care casting the supporting characters who were considered as important to the film as the main characters.

On March 21, 2005, Mary Elizabeth Winstead and Ryan Merriman—co-stars of The Ring Two (2005)—were cast as Wendy Christensen and Kevin Fischer. Winstead, who had auditioned for the second Final Destination film, won the role because her portrayal of the character's emotion impressed Wong and Morgan. Wong said he had originally intended Wendy to be a "perky blonde" and reworked the character slightly after Winstead was selected. Wong believed the actors were right for their roles. He felt Winstead "[brought] a kind of soulfulness to her role as Wendy" and though her character "is deeply affected by the accident", her strength allows her to remain in control. Wong said when Merriman arrived to audition, he was sure he was "the right guy to play Kevin". He described the character as "the kind of guy you want to hang out with, your goofy best buddy, but also someone who could rise to the occasion and become a hero".

On April 9, 2005, Kris Lemche and Alexz Johnson were cast as the goth couple Ian McKinley and Erin Ulmer. Johnson, who was starring in the Canadian television series Instant Star (2004–2008), had auditioned to play Wendy's sister Julie; that role later went to Amanda Crew, who originally auditioned to play Erin. Johnson said she wore a rocker jacket during her second reading and was in a bad mood. As she was leaving, the filmmakers called her back to read some of Erin's sarcastic dialogue in a scene. Johnson thought her dry sense of humor, which the filmmakers caught, helped her land the part. Of his role, Lemche said Ian "spouts some interesting facts that seem to be just right there on the tips of his fingers". He researched most of Ian's information and during read-throughs often asked Morgan about Ian's facts. Morgan wrote Lemche notes and gave him URLs to research the information Ian gives out.

Jesse Moss was cast as Wendy's boyfriend, Jason Wise. Texas Battle played athlete Lewis Romero. Chelan Simmons took the role of Ashley Freund. Sam Easton portrayed school alumnus Frankie Cheeks. Gina Holden played Kevin's girlfriend and Wendy's best friend, Carrie Dreyer. Crystal Lowe joined the cast as student Ashlyn Halperin. Tony Todd, who appeared in the first two films, did not return as the mortician William Bludworth but voiced the Devil statue at the roller coaster and a subway conductor. Maggie Ma and Ecstasia Sanders played Julie's friends Perry Malinowski and Amber Regan, respectively.

=== Filming and effects ===
Like the first two installments of the franchise, Final Destination 3 was filmed in Vancouver, Canada. The Corkscrew roller coaster at Vancouver's Playland was the Devil's Flight coaster depicted in the film. Winstead and Merriman said the filming took three months. The first two weeks were spent shooting the roller coaster derailment. The rest of the filming was done out of sequence. Filming wrapped in July, but viewers at early screenings reacted negatively to the ending. This led to the filming of a new ending sequence featuring a subway train derailment in November 2005. According to Perry, in the film's revised ending, it was intended to have A. J. Cook and Michael Landes reprise their roles as Kimberly Corman and Officer Thomas Burke, respectively, from the previous movie. However, as one of the actors was unavailable, they decided to omit both characters entirely.

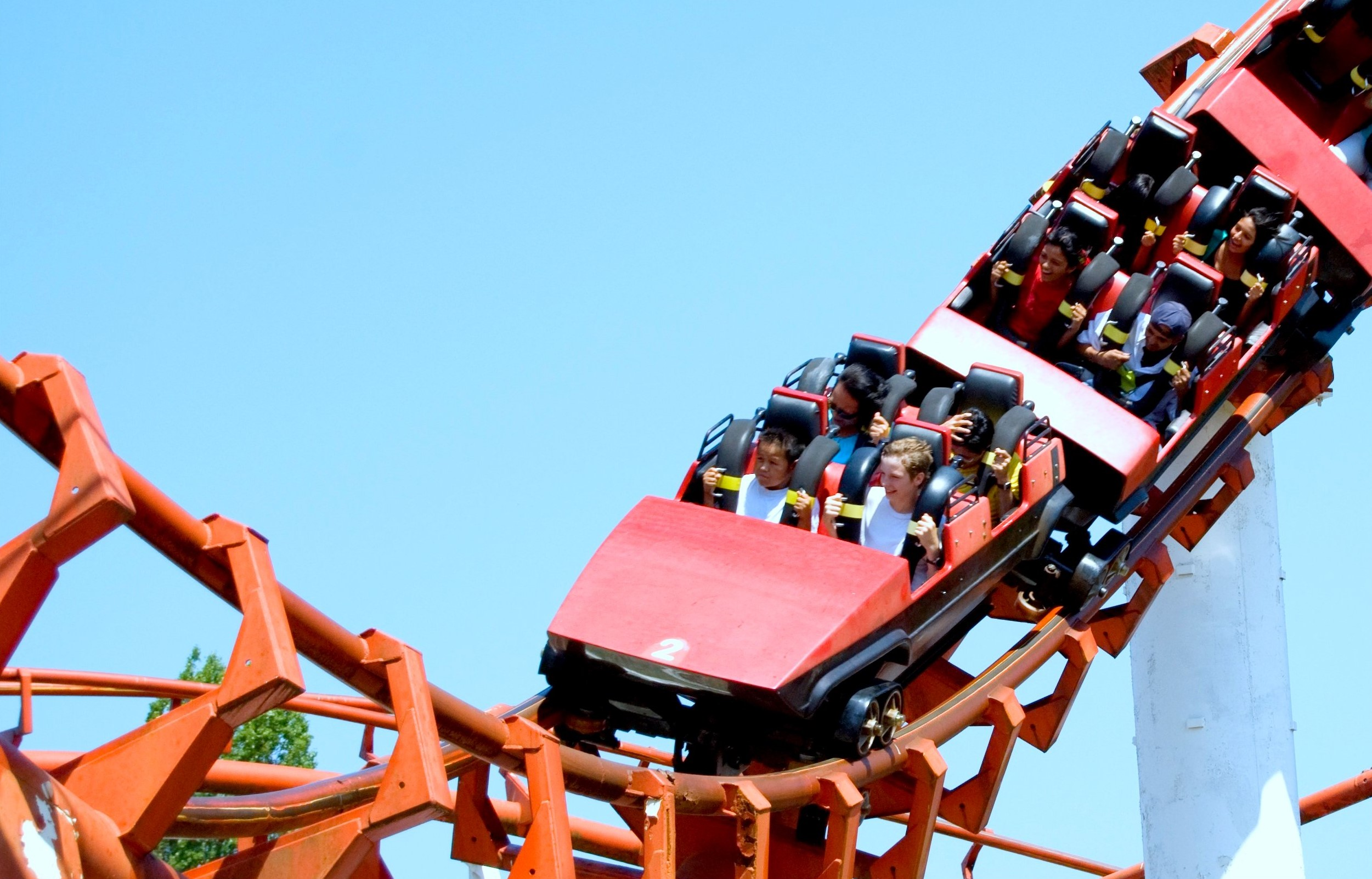
The Corkscrew roller coaster was used as the Devil's Flight in the film. CGI and a variety of camera angles made it look larger.

The death scenes required varying degrees of 2D and 3D graphic enhancement. The roller coaster scene necessitated 144 visual-effect shots. Custom-designed coaster cars were built and modified for the script; most of the model was hand-built and computer-designed MEL scripts added specific elements. For the coaster-crash scenes, the actors were filmed performing in front of a green screen, to which a computer-generated imagery (CGI) background was added. Several of the roller coaster's cars were suspended with bungee cords to film the crash; the deaths required the use of CGI onscreen effects and each actor had a corresponding CGI double.

Meteor Studios produced the roller coaster and subway crashes while Digital Dimension handled the post-premonition death scenes. The death of Ian McKinley, who was bisected by a cherry picker, proved especially challenging. A clean plate of the cherry picker falling was originally shot with a plate of Lemche acting crushed and falling to the ground with his bottom half in a partial green-screen suit. (Note: A blank take (with no actor in the shot) is sometimes taken to give compositors a reference of what parts of the shot are different in each take. In common film-making language, this is also known as shooting a "plate".) After combining those plates, Wong said "he wanted more of a gruesome punch for the shot". A standard CGI body of Lemche's height was used; several animation simulations of the body being crushed with a CGI object were filmed. The director chose the version he liked most. A new plate was then filmed with Lemche imitating the chosen animation and positioning his body at the end. Soho VFX created the scene where Ashley and Ashlyn are killed on tanning beds. It consisted of about 35 shots of CGI skin, glass, fire, and smoke mixed with real fire and smoke. The subway crash in the film's epilogue used a CGI environment reproducing the main aspects of the set.

=== Music ===
The score for Final Destination 3 was composed and conducted by Shirley Walker, who wrote the soundtracks of the series' previous installments. It was performed by the Hollywood Studio Symphony. Score mixer Bobby Fernandez created a "gore-o-meter", measuring the violence of each death to ensure the score would match the scenes. Final Destination 3 is the only film in the series without a commercially released soundtrack. Musician Tommy Lee provided a cover of The O'Jays 1972 song "Love Train", which was used in the film's closing credits. Lee enjoyed "put[ting his] own darker spin on it for the movie".

== Release ==
Several months before the film's release, New Line Cinema set up a promotional website, which linked to another site where visitors could download mobile-phone ringtones and wallpapers related to the film. As a further means of promotion, a novelization written by Christa Faust was published by Black Flame a month before the film's release. Final Destination 3 premiered at Grauman's Chinese Theatre in Hollywood on February 1, 2006. During San Diego Comic-Con 2006, Mary Elizabeth Winstead, James Wong, and Ryan Merriman attended a panel on July 22 to promote the DVD release of the film. They discussed the features of "Choose Their Fate" and the filming of new sequences.

=== Box office ===
Final Destination 3 opened on February 10, 2006, in 2,880 theaters in the United States and Canada. It earned $19,173,094 on its opening weekend with an average of $6,657 per theater. The film placed second domestically behind the remake of The Pink Panther, which opened the same day and earned $20,220,412. Final Destination 3 fell to fifth in its second weekend and seventh in its third, dropping off the top-ten list on its fourth weekend. Its last screening, in 135 theaters, occurred during its tenth weekend; the film finished at 37th place with $105,940. Final Destination 3's total earnings were $54,098,051 at the domestic box office and $63,621,107 internationally, for a worldwide gross of $117,719,158. At the time of its release, the film was the most financially successful installment in the franchise; it retained this title until The Final Destination surpassed it in 2009 with a worldwide gross of $186,167,139.

=== Home media ===
The film was released as a 2-disc DVD on July 25, 2006, by New Line Home Entertainment, in widescreen and full screen formats. Special features include an audio commentary, a deleted scene, three documentaries, the theatrical trailer, and an original animated video. Wong, Morgan, and cinematographer Robert McLachlan provide the audio commentary. The deleted scene is an extended version of Wendy and Kevin's discussion after they are questioned by the police. The first documentary, Dead Teenager Movie, examines the history of slasher films. The second, Kill Shot: Making Final Destination 3, focuses on the making of the film and includes interviews with the cast and crew. Severed Piece, the third documentary, discusses the film's special effects, pyrotechnics, and gore effects. A seven-minute animated film, It's All Around You, explains the various ways people can die.

Special DVD editions labeled "Thrill Ride Edition" also include an optional feature called "Choose Their Fate", allowing viewers to make decisions at several points during the film. Most provide minor alterations to the death scenes, but the first choice allows the viewer to stop Wendy, Kevin, Jason, and Carrie from boarding the roller coaster before the premonition, ending the film immediately. The film grossed $18.9 million in home sales.

== Reception ==
=== Critical response ===
Review aggregator website Rotten Tomatoes reports that 44% of 117 critics gave the film a positive review, with an average rating of 5.1 out of 10. The site's critics consensus reads: "Final Destination 3 is more of the same: gory and pointless, with nowhere new to go." On Metacritic, the film has a weighted average score of 41 out of 100, based on 28 critics, indicating "mixed or average" reviews. Audiences polled by CinemaScore gave the film an average grade of B+ on an A+ to F scale.

Several critics described the story as formulaic compared to the previous installments; Roger Ebert wrote that the film's main issue was its predictability and lack of tension because it was "clear to everyone who must die and in what order". Variety compared the narrative negatively with the franchise's second installment, describing the third film as lacking intricacy. The New York Times similarly described the film as lacking the "novelty of the first [or] the panache of the second". TV Guide called the periods between characters' deaths "dull", highlighting one reason the film failed to match the formula set out in the previous installments. Other reviewers were more positive; IGN praised the story—Chris Carle wrote that the "formula has been perfected rather than worn out" by the third film. Empire's Kim Newman and The Guardian found the story enjoyable, but said Final Destination 3 adhered primarily to the structure set out by the rest of the franchise.

The film's tone and death scenes were positively received by critics. Writing for ReelViews, James Berardinelli described Final Destination 3 as incorporating more humor compared to its predecessors and said it worked to the film's benefit. The Seattle Times agreed the film's humorous tone helped to elevate it and said fans of the franchise would enjoy the death sequences. Sarah Dobbs of Den of Geek! said the tone made Final Destination 3 the high point of the franchise. She commended the film's style as a "brightly coloured [and] slightly silly meditation on how we're all gonna die one day, so we might as well do it explosively". The tanning bed and nail gun scenes were singled out as the best death sequences from the film and the franchise.

Winstead's performance was praised. According to the BBC, "the real tragedy is that promising young actress Mary Elizabeth Winstead must endure this torture". Berardinelli described her as delivering "as competent a job as one could expect in these dire circumstances". Felix Gonzalez, Jr. of DVD Reviews praised Winstead's and Merriman's performances as one of the few positive aspects of the film. Similarly, The Seattle Times praised Winstead for conveying Wendy's emotions. The Daily Telegraph also listed Wendy as one of the top 20 final girls in horror films and praised Winstead's performance for making Wendy a believable character.

=== Accolades ===
Final Destination 3 was nominated at the 2006 Fangoria Chainsaw Awards for Most Thrilling Killing (Best Death Scene) for Frankie's death scene, as well as Highest Body Count, Line That Killed (Best One-Liner), and Sickest FX (Best Special Effects). At the 2007 Saturn Awards it was nominated for Best Horror Film and the "Thrill Ride Edition" was nominated for Best DVD Special Edition Release.

== Sequel ==
After the success of Final Destination 3, which was initially planned to be in 3D, Eric Bress wrote a script, which impressed producer Craig Perry and Warner Bros. enough to green-light a fourth Final Destination installment. James Wong was on board to direct, but because of scheduling conflicts with Dragonball Evolution, he decided to drop out. Consequently, the studio executives opted for David R. Ellis to return because of his work on Final Destination 2. He accepted because of the 3D. For the 3D, Perry said that he wanted it to add depth to the film instead of just "something pop[ping] out at the audience every four minutes".
