= The Final Destination =

2009 American supernatural horror film

- Theatrical release poster
- Directed by: David R. Ellis
- Written by: Eric Bress
- Based on: Characters by Jeffrey Reddick
- Produced by: Craig Perry; Warren Zide
- Starring: Bobby Campo; Shantel VanSanten; Mykelti Williamson
- Cinematography: Glen MacPherson
- Edited by: Mark Stevens
- Music by: Brian Tyler
- Production companies: New Line Cinema; Practical Pictures; Zide/Perry Productions
- Distributed by: Warner Bros. Pictures
- Release date: August 28, 2009
- Running time: 82 minutes
- Country: United States
- Language: English
- Budget: $40 million
- Box office: $187.4 million

The Final Destination is a 2009 American supernatural horror film directed by David R. Ellis and written by Eric Bress. It is a standalone sequel to Final Destination 3 (2006) and the fourth installment in the Final Destination film series. It stars Bobby Campo in his feature film debut, Shantel VanSanten, and Mykelti Williamson. Produced by New Line Cinema, the film follows a group of people after they escape a deadly accident during a stock car race, with Death stalking and killing them one by one.

After the commercial success of Final Destination 3, a fourth film entered development and was planned to be in 3D, with Bress writing the script. The script impressed producer Craig Perry and New Line Cinema enough to green-light a fourth installment. James Wong was on board to direct, but because of scheduling conflicts, he decided to drop out. Consequently, the studio executives opted for David R. Ellis to return because of his work on Final Destination 2 (2003), who personally accepted because the film would be released in 3D. Filming began in March 2008 and ended late May in the same year.

The Final Destination was theatrically released on August 28, 2009, by Warner Bros. Pictures and New Line Cinema. It was the first film in the series to be shot in HD 3D and, as of May 2025, is the second highest-grossing Final Destination film, having earned $187.4 million worldwide. It received generally negative reviews from critics. A fifth film, Final Destination 5, was released in August 2011.

== Plot ==
College student Nick O'Bannon watches an auto race with his girlfriend Lori Milligan and their friends Hunt Wynorski and Janet Cunningham at the McKinley Speedway for their semester break. Nick has a premonition of a racetrack accident, where the debris flies into the grandstand and destroys it. The disaster kills him, his friends and several spectators. He panics, causing a fight that forces him and his friends to leave, along with white supremacist tow truck driver Carter Daniels, mother Samantha Lane, mechanic Andy Kewzer and his girlfriend Nadia Monroy, and security guard George Lanter. The disaster occurs, causing a stray wheel to fly out of the stadium and decapitate Nadia.

The following night, while attempting to burn a cross on George's lawn, Carter is dragged by the towing chain of his tow truck and is burned alive, caused by the friction of the chain igniting a gas leak. The next day, Samantha is killed by a rock lodged in the exhaust pipe of a lawnmower. After researching similar disasters parallel to the speedway's, (Note: As depicted in the previous films (2000–2006)) Nick is convinced that ever since they survived, thanks to his premonition, Death is killing them in the order they would have died in the speedway disaster. With George's permission, Nick and Lori review surveillance footage of the disaster to identify the next victim. Seeing that Andy is next, they warn him, but a carbon dioxide tank suddenly launches him into a metal grid fence.

Nick suspects Janet and Hunt are next and teams up with George and Lori to save them. George and Lori save Janet from being killed at a car wash, but Nick fails to save Hunt from being disemboweled by a pool's drain pipe. George surrenders to Death and attempts suicide, but Death sabotages his attempts. Nick learns that another survivor, Jonathan Groves, was recently recovered from the rubble but remembers him dying in his premonition. Nick and George rush to save Jonathan and also conclude that George survived his suicide attempts since it was not his turn yet.

At the hospital, they fail to stop Jonathan from being fatally crushed by an overflowing bathtub from the floor above. They exit, where a speeding ambulance van kills George. Nick suspects Lori and Janet are in danger and rushes to the shopping mall's movie theater. Lori also sees omens but fails to convince Janet to leave. Janet is killed by projectiles that are launched from the screen after the room behind the screen explodes. The explosion engulfs the mall, and when Lori and Nick try to leave, Lori is sucked into the gears of an escalator. Nick realizes that everything after Jonathan's death was another premonition; he fails to save George but succeeds in preventing the mall explosion.

Two weeks later, Nick, Lori, and Janet reunite at a café. Nick suspects that they never changed anything and that Death planned to have them meet at the café at the right time. Before the three can react, a truck swerves to avoid a falling scaffold and crashes into the café, killing them.

== Cast ==
- Bobby Campo as Nick O'Bannon
- Shantel VanSanten as Lori Milligan
- Haley Webb as Janet Cunningham
- Nick Zano as Hunt Wynorski
- Mykelti Williamson as George Lanter
- Krista Allen as Samantha Lane
- Andrew Fiscella as Andy Kewzer
- Justin Welborn as Carter Daniels
- Stephanie Honoré as Nadia Monroy
- Lara Grice as Cynthia Daniels
- Jackson Walker as Jonathan Groves
- Phil Austin as Edward

== Production ==
=== Development ===
After the success of Final Destination 3, which was initially planned to be in 3D, Eric Bress wrote a script, which impressed producer Craig Perry and Warner Bros. Pictures enough to green-light a fourth Final Destination installment. James Wong was on board to direct, but because of scheduling conflicts with Dragonball Evolution, he decided to drop out. Consequently, the studio executives opted for David R. Ellis to return because of his work on Final Destination 2. He accepted because of the 3D. For the 3D, Perry said that he wanted it to add depth to the film instead of just "something pop[ping] out at the audience every four minutes".

=== Filming ===
A car on the "McKinley Speedway" sequence as shown in film

Although shooting was to be done in Vancouver, which was where the previous three films were shot, David R. Ellis convinced the producers to shoot in New Orleans instead to bring business to the city, and because the budget was already large. The opening crash sequence at "McKinley Speedway" was filmed at Mobile International Speedway in Irvington, Alabama. Filming began in March 2008 and ended in late May in the same year. The film was shot on the Sony CineAlta F23, while side-by-side rigs, configured with two Sony HDC-F950 cameras, were used for the racing sequences and the underwater scenes. Reshoots were done in April 2009 at Universal Studios Florida with the ending being filmed in the New York section of the park.

== Music ==
=== Soundtrack ===
The soundtrack album was released on August 25, 2009, three days before the film's theatrical release, under public record label JVC/Sony Music Australia. The album consists of 23 cues composed and mixed by Brian Tyler. He took over scoring the series after the untimely death of the composer for the first three films, Shirley Walker.

The Final Destination (Original Motion Picture Soundtrack)

Film score by Brian Tyler
- Released: August 25, 2009
- Length: 64:15
- Labels: JVC, Sony Music Australia

Brian Tyler soundtrack chronology
Fast & Furious: Original Motion Picture Score (2009)	The Final Destination (Original Motion Picture Soundtrack) (2009)	Law Abiding Citizen (2009)

Commercial songs from the film, but not on the soundtrack

- "Devour" by Shinedown
- "How the Day Sounds" by Greg Laswell
- "Burning Bridges" by Anvil
- "Why Can't We Be Friends?" by War
- "Don't You Know" by Ali Dee and the Deekompressors
- "Faraway" by Dara Schindler
- "Dream of Me" by Perfect
- "Make My" by The Roots
- "The Stoop" by Little Jackie
- "Sweet Music" by Garrison Hawk
- "Corona and Lime" by Shwayze
- "Make You Crazy" by Brett Dennen

=== Score ===
1. "The Final Destination" – 2:56
2. "The Raceway" – 3:07
3. "Memorial" – 2:46
4. "Nailed" – 3:22
5. "Nick's Google Theory" – 1:30
6. "Revelations" – 2:28
7. "Raceway Trespass" – 1:39
8. "Stay Away from Water" – 2:38
9. "Flame On" – 1:43
10. "Moment of Joy" – 1:17
11. "Signs and Signals" – 2:51
12. "George Is Next" – 1:12
13. "Car Washicide" – 3:05
14. "Newspaper Clues" – 1:57
15. "Premonition" – 1:50
16. "The Salon" – 3:53
17. "Questioning" – 1:04
18. "Death of a Cowboy" – 2:08
19. "Gearhead" – 1:56
20. "Sushi for Everyone" – 2:53
21. "The Movie Theater" – 3:03
22. "You Can't Dodge Fate" – 1:28
23. "The Final Destination Suite" – 13:29

The soundtrack attracted generally favorable reviews. Christian Clemmensen of Filmtracks.com gave the score 3 out of 5 stars and felt Tyler was "capable [...] to further explore new stylistic territory while making substantial use of the structures and tone of [predecessor composer] Shirley Walker's music". His approach to the scores was called "intelligent", and provide "adequate if not strikingly overachieving recordings is testimony to his immense talents".

The reviewers were also impressed with the extension of the sound used by Walker in Final Destination 3. "It relates to an affection for Walker's contribution to the industry," said an unnamed critic.

A SoundNotes reviewer grades the film with an impressive score of 7.5 out of 10, remarking "Brian Tyler slugs his way through the inadequacies of The Final Destination and produces a score with reasonable entertainment value and enough of an appeal to make it function well apart from the woeful film."

== Release ==
The film was released in 3D as well as in conventional theaters on August 28, 2009. It was initially planned for an August 14 release. It was also the first 3D film to feature D-BOX motion feedback technology in select theaters.

=== Box office ===
According to USA Today and Newsday, The Final Destination debuted at the top of the North American box office, beating Rob Zombie's Halloween II, earning $28.3 million during its first weekend. It has also topped the box office in the UK. The film remained at #1 in North America for two weeks, making it the first film in the series to top the box office. On September 11, 2009, it gained just over a million dollars and dropped to No. 7. The film grossed $66.5 million domestically and $120.9 million in foreign sales, with a total of $187.4 million worldwide, making it the highest-grossing film in the franchise until Final Destination Bloodlines surpassed it in May 2025.

=== Home media ===
The Final Destination was initially scheduled for a DVD and Blu-ray Disc release on December 22, 2009. The film was pushed back to January 5, 2010, in the US. Both the DVD and Blu-ray Disc included two pairs of 3D glasses with each set and featured a 2D version on the disc, along with additional scenes. The Blu-ray Disc version included two alternate endings, a "making of" featurette about the deaths, storyboard visualization and a preview of A Nightmare on Elm Street (2010). The Blu-ray Disc release, also a combo pack, includes a standard DVD of the film. The film grossed $15.1 million in home sales.

In Target stores, some of the DVDs included an exclusive Final Destination comic book.

== Reception ==
=== Critical response ===
Review aggregator Rotten Tomatoes reports that 28% of 98 critics gave the film a positive review, with an average rating of 4.1 out of 10. The site's consensus states: "With little of the ingenuity of previous installments, The Final Destination is predictable, disposable horror fare." On Metacritic, the film has a weighted average score of 30 out of 100 based on reviews from 14 critics, indicating "generally unfavorable" reviews. Audiences polled by CinemaScore gave the film an average grade of C on an A+ to F scale.

Jordan Mintzer of Variety magazine wrote: "With an array of gory mayhem only marginally enhanced by 3-D and a plot as developed as a text message, The Final Destination may finally sound the death knell for New Line's near-immortal horror franchise." Kirk Honeycutt of The Hollywood Reporter wrote: "The new gimmick here is that all the flying body parts and absurd impalements come in 3D. And that's about as inspired as anything gets in this edition. Story and character get chucked to the sidelines as the arena has room for only death scenes."

In January 2022, Stephen Rosenberg of MovieWeb ranked the movies of the franchise from worst to best, ranking The Final Destination as the worst of the film series. Rosenberg said that it was better likened to a "straight-to-video or early 2000s SyFy original film". Noting the lack of energy in the acting, Rosenberg also said that none of the actors were memorable and that the dialogue was "chock-full of meta 3D film advertisements".

== Sequel ==
Alan Horn, the head of Warner Bros. Pictures, confirmed at ShoWest in March 2010 that Final Destination 5 was in works at ShoWest. Producer Craig Perry later added that the film would be shot in 3D. Eric Heisserer was announced as screenwriter in April 2010. The studio initially picked August 26, 2011, as the release date, but later changed it to August 12, 2011. In June 2010, New Line Cinema announced that Steven Quale would direct, and that the movie would be renamed 5nal Destination. The name change was reversed a few months later.
