= Jeffrey Reddick =

American screenwriter, director (born 1969)

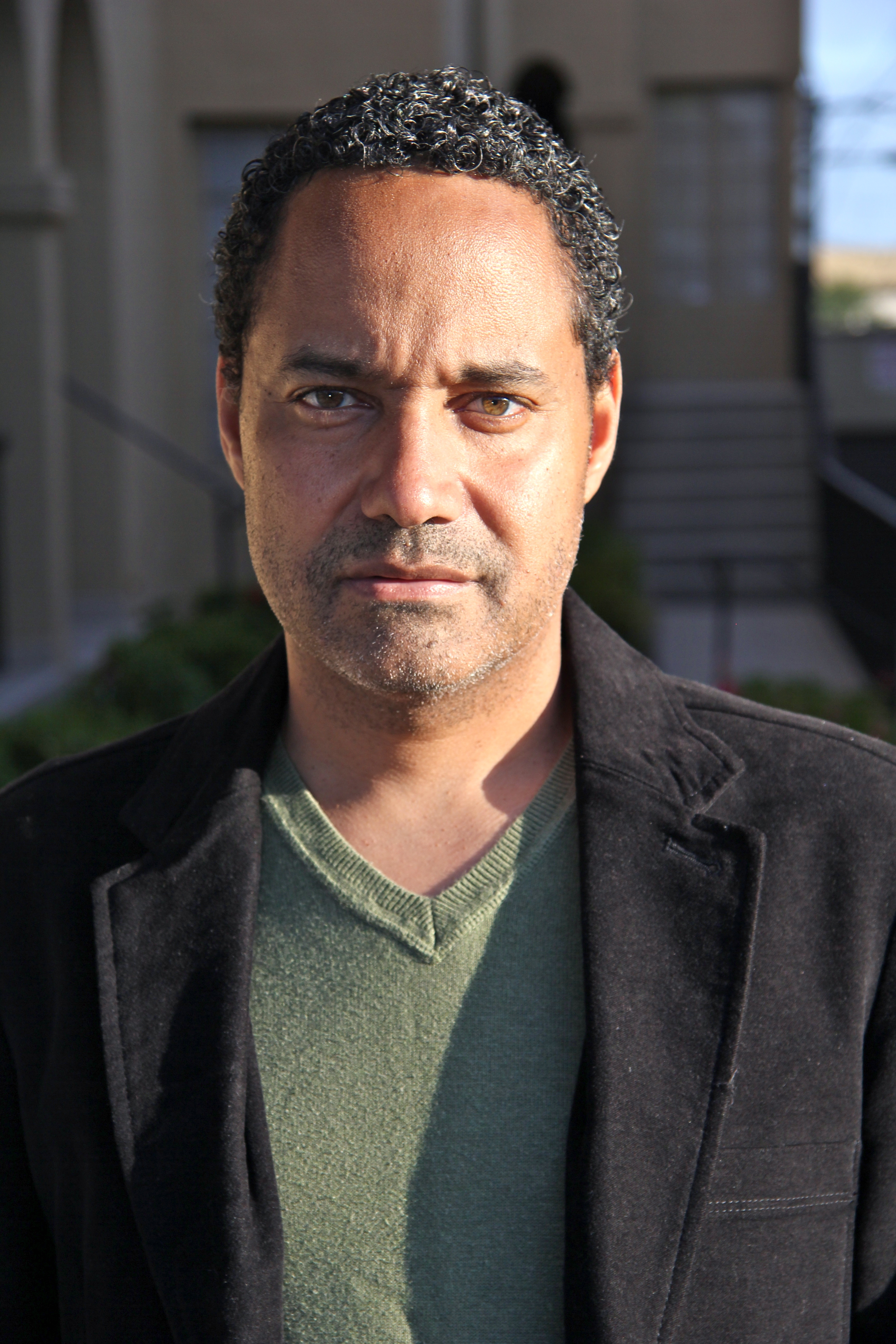
- Reddick in 2012
- Born: July 12, 1969 (age 57); Jackson, Kentucky, U.S.
- Education: Breathitt County High School
- Occupations: Screenwriter, film director
- Notable work: Final Destination

Jeffrey Reddick (born July 12, 1969) is an American screenwriter and film director, best known for creating the Final Destination franchise.

== Early life ==
Reddick was born in Jackson, Kentucky and attended Breathitt County High School. He studied at Berea College.

When Reddick was fourteen, he wrote a ten-page treatment of a prequel to A Nightmare on Elm Street and sent it to New Line Cinema. The studio did not accept unsolicited material, and it was returned unread. Reddick proceeded to contact studio founder Robert Shaye and asked him to read the treatment. Shaye read it and responded. This was the beginning of a letter-and-phone relationship with Shaye and his assistant that lasted for years. While in college, Jeffrey landed an internship at New Line and worked for the studio for almost eleven years.

== Career ==
In 2000, New Line produced Reddick's first studio project Final Destination.

Reddick is mostly known for writing horror films, but he recently worked on two animated series for Netflix, including a spin-off of the classic Japanese comic book Usagi Yojimbo by Stan Sakai. He is currently adapting the YA book series, The Adventures of Young Captain Nemo. He made his directorial debut with his mystery thriller Don't Look Back in 2020.

Reddick was honored with the Hall of Fame Award at the 2018 Boobs and Blood International Film Festival in Los Angeles.

== Personal life ==
Reddick is a member of the Baháʼí Faith. Reddick is gay.

== Filmography ==
=== Film ===
Year	Title	Writer	Producer	Director
2000	Final Destination	Yes	No	James Wong
2003	Final Destination 2	Story	Executive	David R. Ellis
2005	Tamara	Yes	No	Jeremy Haft
2005	A Life's Work	No	Yes	Jason Crain
2008	Day of the Dead	Yes	No	Steve Miner
2016	Dead Awake	Yes	Executive	Phillip Guzman
2017	Sleep No More	No	Executive	Phillip Guzman
2017	Bodysnatch	No	Yes	Louis Benjamin Del Guercio
2018	The Night Sitter	No	Executive	Abiel Bruhn & John Rocco
2018	The Final Wish	Yes	Yes	Timothy Woodward Jr.
2020	The Call	No	Yes	Timothy Woodward Jr.
2020	Don't Look Back	Yes	Yes	Himself
2022	Solo Respira	No	Yes	Felix Lemardo
2023	New Fears Eve	No	Yes	Eric Huskisson & P.J. Starks
2023	The Bell Keeper	No	Executive	Colton Tran
2023	Til Death Do Us Part	No	Yes	Timothy Woodward Jr.
2025	The Other	No	Yes	Paul Etheredge

=== Television ===
Year(s)	Title	Writer	Supervising producer	Notes
2001	Return to Cabin by the Lake	Yes	No	Television film
2007	Dante's Cove	No	Yes	5 episodes
2021	A Tale Dark & Grimm	Yes	No	2 episodes Animated Netflix series
2022	Samurai Rabbit: The Usagi Chronicles	Yes	No	3 episodes Original animated Netflix series

Other credits
Year	Title	Role	Notes
2009	His Name Was Jason: 30 Years of Friday the 13th	Himself	Documentary
2018	Midnight, Texas	Story editor	3 episodes
