= The Butterfly Effect =

2004 American science fiction thriller film

- Theatrical release poster
- Directed by: Eric Bress; J. Mackye Gruber
- Written by: Eric Bress; J. Mackye Gruber
- Produced by: Chris Bender; A.J. Dix; Anthony Rhulen; JC Spink
- Starring: Ashton Kutcher; Amy Smart; Eric Stoltz; William Lee Scott; Elden Henson; Logan Lerman; Ethan Suplee; Melora Walters
- Cinematography: Matthew F. Leonetti
- Edited by: Peter Amundson
- Music by: Michael Suby
- Production companies: FilmEngine; BenderSpink; Katalyst
- Distributed by: New Line Cinema
- Release dates: January 17, 2004 (Sundance Film Festival); January 23, 2004 (United States)
- Running time: 113 minutes
- Country: United States
- Language: English
- Budget: $13 million
- Box office: $96.8 million

The Butterfly Effect is a 2004 American science fiction thriller film written and directed by Eric Bress and J. Mackye Gruber. It stars Ashton Kutcher, Amy Smart, Eric Stoltz, William Lee Scott, Elden Henson, Logan Lerman, Ethan Suplee, and Melora Walters. The title refers to the butterfly effect.

Kutcher plays 20-year-old college student Evan Treborn, who experiences blackouts and memory loss throughout his childhood. In his later 20s, Evan finds he can travel back in time to inhabit his former self during those periods of blackout, with his adult mind inhabiting his younger body. He attempts to change the present by changing his past behaviors and set things right for himself and his friends, but there are unintended consequences for all. The film draws heavily on flashbacks of the characters' lives at ages 7 and 13 and presents several alternative present-day outcomes as Evan attempts to change the past, before settling on an outcome.

The film was released by New Line Cinema on January 23, 2004 and had a poor critical reception; however, it was a commercial success, generating box-office revenues of $96.8 million on a budget of $13 million. The film won the Pegasus Audience Award at the Brussels International Fantastic Film Festival, and was nominated for Best Science Fiction Film at the Saturn Awards and Choice Movie: Thriller in the Teen Choice Awards, but lost to Eternal Sunshine of the Spotless Mind and The Texas Chainsaw Massacre, respectively.

== Plot ==
Growing up, Evan Treborn, his friends Lenny Kagan and Kayleigh Miller, and her brother Tommy suffer severe psychological traumas that leave Evan with frequent amnesia. These include being forced by Tommy and Kayleigh’s father, George, to create child pornography with Kayleigh; nearly being strangled by his institutionalized father Jason, who is then killed by guards; accidentally killing a mother and her infant daughter while playing with dynamite; and witnessing Tommy burn Evan's dog Crockett alive. Evan keeps detailed journals as a coping mechanism.

At university, Evan discovers that reading his journals allows him to time-travel and alter his past. He realises that his blackouts occurred when his older self temporarily occupied his consciousness.

After a traumatised Kayleigh commits suicide, Evan travels back and prevents George from molesting her. He returns to a reality in which he and Kayleigh are a happy couple, but George has instead directed his abuse towards Tommy, who has become violent and dangerous. When Tommy attacks Evan, Evan kills him in self-defence and is imprisoned. His mother brings him a journal, enabling him to time-travel again.

Evan returns to stop Tommy killing Crockett, but Lenny, driven to instability by Tommy's bullying and the dynamite incident, kills Tommy with a metal shard. Evan then awakens in a reality where Lenny is institutionalised and Kayleigh is a drug-addicted prostitute. He travels back to prevent the dynamite accident, but Tommy shields the mother and baby from the blast while Evan is caught in the explosion.

In the resulting reality, Lenny and Kayleigh are happily together, Tommy has become religious, and Evan is a double amputee. His mother's grief over his injuries leads her to smoke obsessively and develop lung cancer. Attempting to save them both, Evan returns to childhood and tries to discard the lit dynamite, but Kayleigh picks it up after George knocks it from Evan's hand, and she is killed in the explosion.

Evan awakens in a mental hospital with no journals and irreversible brain damage from repeatedly travelling through time. He learns that his father possessed the same ability before losing the photographs that enabled him to use it. Concluding that his friends can never have secure futures while he continues changing the past, Evan escapes and uses an old home movie to return to the day he first met Kayleigh.

Evan deliberately frightens Kayleigh so that, following her parents' divorce, she and Tommy choose to live with their mother rather than George. This spares them a destructive upbringing, prevents Tommy from bullying Lenny, and ensures that the dynamite incident never occurs.

Evan awakens in a college dormitory, where Lenny is his roommate. When Evan asks about Kayleigh, Lenny does not recognise the name, confirming that she is safe and that the altered timeline has succeeded. Evan burns his journals and videos to prevent himself from changing the past again.

Eight years later, in New York City, Evan and Kayleigh pass one another on the street. They briefly look at each other before continuing on their separate paths.

=== Director's cut ending ===
With his brain severely damaged and facing permanent confinement in a psychiatric facility, Evan makes one final attempt to alter the timeline. Watching a family video of his mother shortly before giving birth to him, he travels back to that moment and strangles himself in the womb with his umbilical cord, preventing the multi-generational curse from continuing. This ending corresponds with an added scene in which a psychic palm reader tells Evan that he "has no lifeline" and "does not belong to this world". Kayleigh is subsequently shown as a child in the new timeline, having chosen to live with her mother, while a montage indicates that the other childhood characters have also been spared their traumatic lives.

== Cast ==
- Ashton Kutcher as Evan Treborn
  - John Patrick Amedori as Evan at 13
  - Logan Lerman as Evan at 7
- Melora Walters as Andrea Treborn
- Amy Smart as Kayleigh Miller
  - Irene Gorovaia as Kayleigh at 13
  - Sarah Widdows as Kayleigh at 7
- Elden Henson as Lenny Kagan
  - Kevin G. Schmidt as Lenny at 13
  - Jake Kaese as Lenny at 7
- William Lee Scott as Tommy Miller
  - Jesse James as Tommy at 13
  - Cameron Bright as Tommy at 7
- Eric Stoltz as George Miller
- Callum Keith Rennie as Jason Treborn
- Lorena Gale as Mrs. Boswell
- Nathaniel Deveaux as Dr. Redfield
- Ethan Suplee as Thumper
- Camille Sullivan as Cricket
- Kevin Durand as Carlos

== Production ==
=== Development ===
After realizing how different his life would be if he could alter his past and prevent a traumatic experience from happening, Eric Bress, and his co-writing partner J. Mackye Gruber, penned The Blackouts in 1998. The pair's first draft, which included "a 6-year-old running around shooting cops in the head", was deemed too dark for general audiences by their manager and heavily contrasted with their previous, Coen Brothers-inspired spec scripts. Bress and Gruber put The Blackouts on ice for two years until producers J.C. Spink and Chris Bender requested to read the script. Haunted by the script's ending, where the main protagonist strangles himself inside his mother's womb, Bender and Spink signed the writers the next day and oversaw subsequent revisions; the first of which delved too deep into "lighthearted rom-com territory" and a follow-up that returned to the initial draft's bleak tone.

Every studio that was presented Bress and Gruber's screenplay was hesitant to produce the film due to its dark subject material, coupled with the pair's insistence on directing the project. Richard Brener, an executive at New Line Cinema, was impressed by the duo and enlisted them to draft Final Destination 2. When Final Destination 2 got off the ground with David R. Ellis in the director's chair, New Line circled back to The Blackouts and gave Bress and Gruber the go-ahead to direct the film.

=== Pre-production ===
The studio considered several high-profile actors, including Tobey Maguire, for the lead role of Evan Treborn while Bress and Gruber were eyeing a "virtual unknown". When the unnamed actor suddenly gained notability, Bress and Gruber lost contact with them. Bress and Gruber met with Ashton Kutcher upon suggestion from the studio and were impressed with his insights, casting him as Evan shortly thereafter. By March 2002, the film was re-titled The Butterfly Effect, while Amy Smart, William Lee Scott, and Elden Henson were in talks for supporting roles. The remaining supporting cast was rounded out by Melora Walters, Eric Stoltz, Ethan Suplee, and Logan Lerman.

=== Filming ===
Production commenced on May 27, 2002 in Vancouver with Matthew Leonetti serving as cinematographer and lasted until June. Kutcher served as an executive producer on the film. The actor worked closely with John Patrick Amedori, who portrayed 13 year old Evan, to ensure consistency across their performances and also studied dissociative disorders in preparation for his role.

As the film's ending was gearing up to be shot, the studio and Bender got cold feet and pushed for a more hopeful conclusion. They allowed the ending to be filmed as originally planned, with a two week old infant propped on a lazy Susan, but also commissioned three alternative endings despite the resistance of the directors, Leonetti, and Kutcher.

=== Post-production ===
During the editing process, Bress and Gruber realized their dark sense of humor did not translate to screen. One segment, in which Evan wakes up as a bilateral amputee, was meant to be comedic, but test audiences were "so engrossed in the story they would take things more seriously" than the directors intended. Studio notes also prompted the filmmakers to drop a "distressing" shot of a dummy burning up on the pavement and a scene where Kutcher's character is sexually assaulted.

Of the four endings filmed, the studio's preference was a "meet cute" between older Evan and Kayleigh. However, test audiences reacted strongly towards the ending where Evan travels back to his childhood to sever ties with Kayleigh completely. The audience-favored ending was selected by the studio, while the initial finale was never screened. Bress and Gruber felt betrayed by the studio's decision, though eventually came around on the chosen conclusion. Bender believed the theatrical cut's ending remained true to the filmmaker's story, telling The Ringer, "It was a choice he made. It just wasn't as dark of a choice.”

== Release ==
=== Theatrical ===
The Butterfly Effect premiered at the 2004 Sundance Film Festival on January 17, 2004. The film received a wide theatrical release by New Line Cinema on January 23, 2004.

== Alternative endings ==
The Butterfly Effect has four different endings that were shot for the film:

1. The theatrical release ending shows Evan passing Kayleigh on the sidewalk, he sees her, and recognizes her, but keeps walking. She also has a brief moment of recognition but also keeps walking.
2. The "happy ending" alternative ending shows Evan and Kayleigh stopping on the sidewalk when they cross paths. They introduce themselves and Evan asks her out for coffee.
3. The "open-ended" alternative ending is similar to the one where Evan and Kayleigh pass each other on the sidewalk and keep walking, except this time Evan, after hesitating, turns and follows Kayleigh. This ending was utilized in the film's novelization, written by James Swallow and published by Black Flame.
4. The director's cut ending shows Evan watching the recording of his mother giving birth to him. He proceeds to go back in time to the day when he was born and then strangles himself inside his mother's uterus.

=== Novelization ===
British author James Swallow penned a novelization of The Butterfly Effect on December 30, 2003, published by Black Flame. Swallow incorporated scenes that were dropped in the final edit of the film and included "moments to tie up a couple of loose threads that the movie couldn't get to". The novel has since gone out of print following the closure of Black Flame.

== Reception ==
=== Box office ===
The Butterfly Effect opened alongside Win a Date with Tad Hamilton!. The film reached the top spot of the box office upon its opening weekend, grossing $17,100,000, displacing Along Came Polly to second place. David Tuckerman of New Line Cinema estimated that despite the film's negative reception, audiences were drawn to see Kutcher in a serious role. In its second weekend, the film placed second behind You Got Served and grossed $9,900,000. By the end of its theatrical run in May 2004, The Butterfly Effect earned $57,938,693 domestically and $96,693,728 worldwide.

=== Critical reception ===
Critical reception for The Butterfly Effect was generally poor. On review aggregator website Rotten Tomatoes, the film holds a 34% approval rating based on 169 reviews; the rating average is 4.8/10. The site's consensus reads: "The premise is intriguing, but it's placed in the service of an overwrought and tasteless thriller." On Metacritic, another review aggregator, it has a score of 30 out of 100 based on 35 reviews, indicating "generally unfavorable reviews". Audiences polled by CinemaScore gave the film an average grade of "B+" on an A+ to F scale.

Roger Ebert wrote that he "enjoyed The Butterfly Effect, up to a point" and that the "plot provides a showcase for acting talent, since the actors have to play characters who go through wild swings." However, Ebert said that the scientific notion of the butterfly effect is used inconsistently: Evan's changes should have wider reverberations. Sean Axmaker of the Seattle Post-Intelligencer called it a "metaphysical mess", criticizing the film's mechanics for being "fuzzy at best and just plain sloppy the rest of the time". Mike Clark of USA Today also gave the film a negative review, stating, "Normally, such a premise comes off as either intriguing or silly, but the morbid subplots (there's prison sex, too) prevent Effect from becoming the unintentional howler it might otherwise be." Additionally, Ty Burr of The Boston Globe went as far as saying, "whatever train-wreck pleasures you might locate here are spoiled by the vile acts the characters commit."

Matt Soergel of The Florida Times-Union rated it three stars out of four, writing, "The Butterfly Effect is preposterous, feverish, creepy and stars Ashton Kutcher in a dramatic role. It's a blast... a solidly entertaining B-movie. It's even quite funny at times..." The Miami Herald said, "The Butterfly Effect is better than you might expect despite its awkward, slow beginning, drawing you in gradually and paying off in surprisingly effective and bittersweet ways," and added that Kutcher is "appealing and believable... The Butterfly Effect sticks to its rules fairly well... overall the film is consistent in its flights of fancy." The Worcester Telegram & Gazette praised it as "a disturbing film" and "the first really interesting film of 2004," adding that Kutcher "carries it off":

Written and directed by Eric Bress and J. Mackye Gruber, who co-wrote Final Destination 2, this is much more intelligent than their earlier film would suggest... The Butterfly Effect may be a little too unconventional to succeed with a mass audience, but filmgoers claiming they want 'something different' from Hollywood ought to take note.

In a retrospective, Peter Bradshaw of The Guardian wrote that critics, including himself, were too harsh on the film at the time of its release. Describing the film as having been patronized, Bradshaw cited critical disdain for Kutcher as making the film uncool to like.

=== Accolades ===
Award	Category	Recipient	Result	Ref.
Saturn Awards	Best Science Fiction Film		Nominated	
Brussels International Festival of Fantasy Film	Pegasus Audience Award	Eric Bress and J. Mackye Gruber	Won	
Teen Choice Awards	Choice Movie: Thriller		Nominated	

== Sequels and attempted reboot ==
The Butterfly Effect 2 was released direct to video in the United States on October 10, 2006. Directed by John R. Leonetti and scripted by Michael D. Weiss, the film received negative reviews upon release.

The Butterfly Effect 3: Revelations was directed by Seth Grossman from a screenplay by Holly Brix and deviated from the previous two films by integrating elements of mystery and horror. The film was distributed straight to video by After Dark Films on March 31, 2009 as a part of their 8 Films to Die For lineup and received a warmer reception than its predecessor.

A reboot entered development in July 2013. Chris Bender, J.C. Spink, Anthony Rhulen, and Navid McIllhargey were on board as producers and Eric Bress was attached as the project's screenwriter.

== See also ==
- Fetching Cody
- Time Freak
- Frequency
- Erased
- Life Is Strange
- Until Dawn
- A Sound of Thunder (1952 short story by Ray Bradbury)
- List of films featuring time loops
