= List of Kyle XY episodes =

This is an episode list for the science fiction teen drama television series Kyle XY. The series premiered in the United States on June 26, 2006, and ended on March 16, 2009, on ABC Family with 43 episodes produced.

== Series overview ==
Season	Episodes	Originally released	
Season	Episodes	First released	Last released
1	10	June 26, 2006	August 28, 2006
2	23	June 11, 2007	March 17, 2008
3	10	January 12, 2009	March 16, 2009

== Episodes ==
=== Season 1 (2006) ===
No. overall	No. in season	Title	Directed by	Written by	Original release date
1	1	"Pilot"	Gil Junger	Eric Bress & J. Mackye Gruber	June 26, 2006
A mysterious teenager with no navel and no memory of his life up to that point, wakes up in a forest outside Seattle, Washington, naked and covered in a slimy pink substance. He wanders around the city, and is soon arrested and booked into a juvenile detention center. Nicole Trager, a psychologist, takes Kyle in as part of her family.
2	2	"Sleepless in Seattle"	Mike Rohl	Eric Tuchman	July 3, 2006
Kyle encounters the concept of time and wonders why those around him focus on it. He ponders as to why people sleep as he suffers from lack of sleep.
3	3	"The Lies that Bind"	Holly Dale	Curtis Kheel	July 10, 2006
Kyle learns about lying; Lori leaves Kyle at home and Josh has him do his test for summer school. At the beginning of the episode, the police find a skeleton and think that Kyle might be connected to it.
4	4	"Diving In"	Mike Rohl	Julie Plec	July 17, 2006
Kyle has his first dream, in which he is underwater in a pool, with Amanda swimming towards him. He tries to understand his feelings for Amanda. While at the local pool with Lori and Josh, Kyle jumps in the pool and Amanda rescues him, which causes him to get an erection. Hillary convinces Lori to sleep with Declan and she does at a party, but then realizes it was all a lie. Kyle is waiting for Amanda at the party to give her a drawing he made of her, but she introduces him to her boyfriend, Charlie, and Kyle is heartbroken. Meanwhile, at the same party Josh hooks up with a hot busty girl he met at the pool, but is interrupted by the parents chaperoning the party.
5	5	"This is Not a Test"	Pat Williams	Bryan M. Holdman	July 24, 2006
Nicole is planning to enjoy a quiet afternoon in the house alone with Stephen, but suddenly, she hears a window break. Tom Foss, the mystery man, has broken in and planted bugs throughout the Trager house. Kyle, Lori and Josh all experience hard first day of school.
6	6	"Blame it on the Rain"	Michelle MacLaren	Elle Triedman	July 31, 2006
When the rain comes in, everyone is cooped up inside and secrets start to come out. After a rough night of nightmares, Kyle is troubled about his lack of knowledge and begins to wonder if he will ever find out who he really is.
7	7	"Kyle Got Game"	Pat Williams	Steven Lilien & Bryan Wynbrandt	August 7, 2006
Troubled by Kyle's vivid nightmares, Nicole continues searching for the man in Kyle's dreams and the possible link this man may have to the body found in the woods. Meanwhile, Kyle takes a liking to basketball and Josh places many bets on Kyle, but gets more than he bargained for.
8	8	"Memory Serves"	Guy Norman Bee	Michael Oates Palmer	August 14, 2006
Kyle is becoming desperate for information about his past and everyone in the Trager family is taking notice. On his quest, he reaches University of Washington where he finds out about Adam Baylin, a bright student who disappeared twenty years ago and bore striking resemblance to him.
9	9	"Overheard"	Michael Robison	Eric Tuchman and Steven Lilien & Bryan Wynbrandt	August 21, 2006
After Tom Foss's warning in the forest, Kyle decides to give up his search for his past, but with coaxing by Nicole and a newfound extraordinary talent of super hearing and the ability to read lips, he decides to go back to his search.
10	10	"Endgame"	Michael Robison	Julie Plec & Bryan M. Holdman	August 28, 2006
A couple, David and Julie Peterson, who claim to be Kyle's biological parents, show up at the hospital to take Kyle home with them. The Tragers disagree with the Petersons but Kyle, initially suspicious of the Petersons, changes his mind and decides to go with them. Kyle meets Adam Baylin at the end of the season.

=== Season 2 (2007–08) ===
No. overall	No. in season	Title	Directed by	Written by	Original release date
11	1	"The Prophet"	Michael Robison	Eric Tuchman	June 11, 2007
After a long search, Kyle finally starts to get some of the answers he was looking for. Adam Baylin teaches him what his mind is capable of, but is assassinated by Zzyzx.
12	2	"The Homecoming"	Pat Williams	Tommy Thompson	June 18, 2007
Following Baylin's death, Kyle is reunited with the Tragers in the guise of the Petersons having died in a car accident, but he finds that he needs to lie about his past, including to Declan. Foss destroys the Zzyzx headquarters by firebombing it, which inadvertently releases their second "experimental subject", 781228. She is later captured, endangering Kyle in the process.
13	3	"The List is Life"	Pat Williams	Julie Plec	June 25, 2007
At a bonfire, Kyle saves a girl from a burning building, while coming in contact with subject 781228. Amanda's boyfriend, Charlie, is put on "the list" as the school's biggest slut, and Hillary reveals that she had slept with him. Lori and Declan break up.
14	4	"Balancing Act"	Michael Robison	Steven Lilien & Bryan Wynbrandt	July 2, 2007
Foss is alarmed by a murder in the forest, which pushes Kyle to his breaking point. Declan's probe of what he believes in Kyle's secret could have major consequences.
15	5	"Come to Your Senses"	Morgan Beggs	Chad Fiveash & James Patrick Stoteraux	July 9, 2007
Coming back to work, Nicole has a startling new patient: 781228, now known as Jessi. Jessi was recommended by her "sister", Emily Hollander, because Jessi supposedly had a rough childhood. In truth, Jessi has been sent on a mission: Get closer to Kyle. Meanwhile, Kyle's mission is to find Amanda's stolen bracelet, and Josh comes under fire from his parents after discovering that he had experimented with pot. After his recent redundancy, Stephen is given a job interview.
16	6	"Does Kyle Dream of Electric Fish?"	Chris Grismer	R.P. Gaborno & Chris Hollier	July 16, 2007
Kyle believes he can predict the future after having multiple visions, which all come true. Using clues from his visions Kyle delves deeper into Baylin's research, hoping to find an answer.
17	7	"Free To Be You and Me"	Guy Norman Bee	Julie Plec	July 23, 2007
Kyle and Amanda prepare for their first date. Having received an encrypted warning from Baylin about Foss, Kyle wonders whom he can really trust and let into his life. A student protest and alternative dance is organized when the school's policy of excluding same-sex couples becomes known. Jessi has a big fit at the dance when her sister tries to make her leave.
18	8	"What's the Frequency, Kyle?"	Chris Grismer	Steven Lilien & Bryan Wynbrandt	July 30, 2007
Stephen's estranged father suffers a stroke and goes into a coma; Kyle's visions help Stephen reconcile with his father before his death. Emily is dismayed by Jessi's lack of progress in therapy; Kyle and Amanda share their first kiss.
19	9	"Ghost in the Machine"	Guy Norman Bee	Eric Bress & J. Mackye Gruber	August 6, 2007
Lori's decisions come back to haunt her while on a camping expedition with Kyle, Jessi, Declan, Josh, Andy and Amanda, when they stumble upon the ruins of Zzyzx in the woods. Josh and Andy both admit something important to each other. Kyle and Declan suspect that Jessi likes Kyle. Amanda is unsure if she and Kyle are actually a couple or not. Kyle gets a special box from Adam Baylin.
20	10	"House of Cards"	Pat Williams	Chad Fiveash & James Patrick Stoteraux	August 13, 2007
After Kyle realizes that it is Baylin's Latnok ring that will open the mysterious box he retrieved from Zzyzx, he is shocked to see Stephen's new boss, Julian Ballantine (whom Stephen has invited to the house for dinner), wearing the same ring Kyle pawned to help Amanda. Kyle comes up with a plan to get it back with the help of Foss and Declan, breaking into Madacorp to get it done. Meanwhile, Lori starts to have suspicions about Stephen's relationship with one of his new coworkers, Emily Hollander. After a session with Jessi in which Nicole told her to draw a picture, Nicole soon discovers that Jessi draws in the same pointillism style as Kyle, and that she had illustrated the same Zzyzx symbol that Kyle drew in pieces in the last season.
21	11	"Hands on a Hybrid"	Rachel Talalay	Bryan M. Holdman	August 20, 2007
After finding an old photo of Baylin and a Jessi lookalike locked in Baylin's box, Kyle and Declan realize that the best way to crack the mystery of Jessi is to get close to her at a school charity event. Once there, Kyle uses the opportunity to get to know to the already vulnerable Jessi. Meanwhile, other secrets are revealed during the event as Lori finds out the identity of her attacker. Josh and Andy share a kiss. Amanda finds Kyle and Jessi together in a room and has doubts. Foss, now held captive by Ballantine, begins to be interrogated under a lie detector.
22	12	"Lockdown"	Michael Robison	Charley Dane & Julie Plec	August 27, 2007
With Jessi having escaped her house, Nicole puts the Trager family on lockdown. Foss' fate is revealed while Nicole and Stephen both uncover secrets about Kyle. Kyle attempts to escape the house with the help of an old friend, hoping to find Jessi as well as protect his family.
23	13	"Leap of Faith"	Rachel Talalay	Eric Tuchman	September 3, 2007
In the midseason finale, Kyle and Jessi try to find out more about their past, while the Tragers sift through what they know about Kyle to find out who he really is. Kyle and Jessi explore an old, washed out road, previously known as Route 12. They stumble upon an abandoned cabin, and to get in a secret room, Kyle calls Amanda and asks her to play a melody. With it, Kyle and Jessi are able to enter the secret room. Inside, they find a comatose Adam Baylin. Kyle tries to communicate with him, but is unable to do so, and asks Jessi to help him. After some prodding, she helps him long enough for Baylin to say, "Kyle stop, she's betrayed you." Scared, Jessi runs away. Kyle runs after her and they argue, but in the end, Jessi jumps off the side of a dam.
24	14	"To C.I.R., With Love"	Guy Norman Bee	Chad Fiveash & James Patrick Stoteraux	January 14, 2008
Jessi survives the fall. Foss finds Kyle stunned after Jessi took her leap, and tells Kyle to go home. Kyle returns to the Tragers to tell them the truth about his existence. He also hatches a plan to defeat Madacorp. Kyle's plan is threatened by the fact that Jessi had survived the leap and is aching to give up the stolen information. Kyle and Jessi link telepathically and together block the C.I.R., which forces them to put Kyle on the machine, allowing him to destroy the Madacorp network. The episode concludes with Brian Taylor telling a hospitalized Jessi he is her father.
25	15	"The Future's So Bright, I Gotta Wear Shades"	Chris Grismer	Steven Lilien & Bryan Wynbrandt	January 21, 2008
Kyle and Jessi's secret is jeopardized as Jessi struggles with what the future holds for her. She decides to show the public her tricks by jumping off a roof and walking across a pool, enjoying the resulting publicity. Meanwhile, Amanda's mother witnesses Kyle mastering levitation. Problems escalate as Jessi offers to show live cameras her tricks.
26	16	"Great Expectations"	John Kretchmer	Bryan M. Holdman	January 28, 2008
Amanda unexpectedly returns home, which causes Kyle to re-evaluate his relationship with her. But Amanda has a secret that is keeping Kyle on the edge of heartbreak. She can't see him because she used her mother's birthday surprise as an excuse to tell her that she has dropped out. Carol Bloom blames Kyle and grounds Amanda until she goes back to the conservatory in New York.
27	17	"Grounded"	Michael DeCarlo	R.P. Gaborno & Chris Hollier	February 4, 2008
After receiving an anonymous complaint about Kyle, a social worker makes a surprise visit to the Trager home. What should be uneventful becomes tricky with Kyle harboring Amanda in his room and Lori hiding a closet full of beer. Plus, they haven't figured out how to explain a reason for Kyle sleeping in a tub. Despite everything, the Tragers have to convince the social worker that they are a happy, normal, family. Mrs. Bloom is accused by Amanda of filing the complaint, but the social worker is revealed at the end as a spy for Latnok.
28	18	"Between The Rack and a Hard Place"	James Head	Chad Fiveash & James Patrick Stoteraux	February 11, 2008
Amanda gets a job at The Rack, but her first day does not go well. Meanwhile, Jessi's presence in Kyle's life continues to irk Amanda. Josh, covering for his absent supervisor for the afternoon, is placed in a difficult situation when $120 goes missing from The Rack's cash register.
29	19	"First Cut Is the Deepest"	Michael Robison	David A. Weinstein	February 18, 2008
Kyle takes Jessi on a trip to University of Washington to learn more about the woman with Baylin in the old photograph, Sarah Emerson, while she continues to try proving that she is better than Kyle. Meanwhile, Hillary, Lori, and Amanda attempt to book a cool DJ for prom. Declan and Kyle get involved in a fistfight when a college boy tries to punch Kyle. Kyle finds Jessi to be continuing to push herself. Amanda tells Kyle that she accepts the fact that she has to share her boyfriend with other people. Andy and Josh receive counseling from Nicole.
30	20	"Primary Colors"	Peter DeLuise	Bryan M. Holdman	February 25, 2008
Baylin recovers and meets up with Kyle. Kyle starts to experience mental hiccups when he is pulled in too many directions. Nicole asks Kyle to take it easy but Kyle wants to help Josh, Declan and Hillary with their placement exams, Steven with the dinner and Lori with lyrics for her prom song. Andy comes back with the news that her cancer has gone into remission, and Jessi suspects that Kyle is responsible for it. Meanwhile, Declan seems to be getting somewhat jealous about Lori once she starts hanging out and talking to Mark. Amanda is worried that Kyle is sick and plays Kyle's song on the piano, thinking it will help him. Amanda's mother agrees to Kyle's request to take Amanda to the prom because she is pleased that Amanda has started playing the piano again. Kyle's hiccups heal after he and Baylin decode a message saying that Sarah is alive.
31	21	"Grey Matters"	Michael Robison	Eric Tuchman	March 3, 2008
The gray lines between right and wrong are tested after a cheating scandal rocks Beachwood High. After studying hard, Josh is devastated to learn that he is one of the accused while Kyle is shocked to find out he is suspected of being the ringleader. After Principal Hooper threatens to cancel the prom, Kyle and Josh have to find a way to clear their names without implicating other students. Meanwhile, Taylor continues to push Jessi in her training for a Latnok presentation. The episode ends with Kyle meeting Sarah in the same diner that was seen in the old photograph.
32	22	"Hello..."	Peter DeLuise	Michael Berns	March 10, 2008
After Kyle is able to track Sarah down, she implores him to get Jessi away from Taylor. However, this task is easier said than done as Kyle must deal with Jessi's stubbornness and Sarah's adamant request to remain hidden. Meanwhile, the other kids are over their heads with the upcoming prom festivities. Amanda is stuck in prom planning hell; Andy informs Josh that they are going even though they are underage and have no cash; and Lori bemoans the whole ridiculousness of the prom situation, while still curious as to whom Declan is going to ask.
33	23	"I've Had the Time of My Life"	Michael Robison	Julie Plec	March 17, 2008
After extensive research Kyle is still trying to figure out how to make prom night perfect for Amanda, but all of the teen movies in the world (including Prom Night) can't help him. Kyle isn't the only one who is trying to make it a night to remember – Declan is also pulling out all the stops to show Lori how he really feels and let her decide on future actions. Meanwhile, Andy hints to Josh at a special ending, and amidst the drama, Jessi makes a surprising announcement about her future with Sarah. At the end, Amanda is abducted from the school parking lot in her prom dress after Kyle goes back inside to retrieve her street clothes.

=== Season 3 (2009) ===
No. overall	No. in season	Title	Directed by	Written by	Original release date	U.S. viewers (millions)
34	1	"It Happened One Night"	Chris Grismer	Eric Tuchman	January 12, 2009	1.497
Kyle awakens inside a Latnok building, where he attempts to escape and rescue Amanda from Latnok's clutches. Jessi comes to Kyle's aid when she senses his troubles, but she must abandon Sarah in order to do so.
35	2	"Psychic Friend"	Michael Robison	Julie Plec	January 19, 2009	1.426
Kyle goes to see a psychic at a fair, who reveals to him that his soulmate is in danger. Fearing for Amanda's life, Kyle becomes very overprotective of her. However, Amanda in turn feels smothered by him, and goes to a concert with Lori and Hillary to escape the pressure. Kyle then enlists Jessi's help to save Amanda, but winds up actually saving Jessi instead of Amanda following an accident at the concert. Elsewhere, Lori and Hillary finally deal with the consequences of Hillary and Declan's kiss.
36	3	"Electric Kiss"	Chris Grismer	Gayle Abrams	January 26, 2009	1.239
Kyle's apprehension about Amanda gets worse as she frequently suffers from headaches that hinder her preparation for a very important piano recital. Convinced that Latnok did something other than sedate her the night she was kidnapped after the prom, Kyle discovers that her discomfort is due to a neural device implanted by Latnok that should no longer be active after her abduction. Kyle enlists Jessi to help Amanda, but Jessi's constant presence with Kyle and her moving in with the Tragers only agitates Amanda more. As part of an experiment to help Amanda, Kyle kisses Jessi, but Amanda walks in on them. Though she breaks up with him on the spot, he manages to give Amanda one last kiss, which destroys the device.
37	4	"In the Company of Men"	Guy Norman Bee	Daniel Arkin	February 2, 2009	1.105
With Kyle heartbroken over being dumped by Amanda, everyone attempts to cheer him up, including Declan and Josh, who take him to a local bar that doesn't check IDs. Having too many drinks, Kyle decides to show off his abilities to impress the bar patrons. Once the boys are able to get him out of the bar, they discover Josh's car has been towed and, in a desperate attempt to avoid calling the parents, they boldly steal the car back from the impound. The dreadful night doesn't end there: back home, Kyle is met by Foss, who informs him that Adam Baylin has died. Stephen forbids Lori from dating Mark, so she uses Jessi's apartment as a getaway.
38	5	"Life Support"	Michael Robison	Bryan M. Holdman	February 9, 2009	1.366
Nicole, Kyle and Josh are en route to a psychology conference, but they get into an accident when Kyle (who was driving) becomes distracted and suddenly swerves to avoid hitting another car, which sends the Tragers' vehicle off the road before crashing into a ravine. The trio are consequently stranded in the woods with no means of communication, while Nicole is trapped inside. To make matters worse, the other driver is a pregnant woman named Gretchen, who then goes into labor. Kyle comes back every five minutes to seek Nicole's advice on how to deliver Gretchen's baby (a boy), which he delivers with Josh's help. Kyle communicates telepathically with Jessi, enabling assistance to be sent. However, Nicole is hospitalized with extensive internal bleeding. Kyle impersonates a doctor and uses his powers to try to make Nicole better, but it doesn't work and so he grudgingly turns to Cassidy, who tells him that Latnok will provide a remedy for Nicole only if Kyle joins them, and Kyle agrees. Meanwhile, Lori and Jessi are having trouble with each other and Josh's multiple phone calls to Andy go unanswered, but she shows up at the hospital after he leaves her a pained voicemail. Kyle returns from Nicole's room, announcing that she will be fine. Lori apologizes to Jessi for her rudeness.
39	6	"Welcome to Latnok"	Guy Norman Bee	R.P. Gaborno & Chris Hollier	February 16, 2009	1.279
After Cassidy helps to save Nicole's life, Kyle is a man of his word and begins to pay his debt back to Latnok. But what Kyle finds is a complete surprise — Latnok is not some dark and scary place, but rather a hip college hangout for brilliant young minds, including Mark. Still not willing to give them the benefit of the doubt, Kyle decides after his first day there never to return, but rethinks his decision when he finds out about his family's financial dilemma, for which he enters a contest at Latnok in hopes of winning a large cash prize. Meanwhile, Jessi comes clean about everything to Kyle, which brings about mixed results.
40	7	"Chemistry 101"	James Head	Steven Lilien & Bryan Wynbrandt	February 23, 2009	1.240
Still reeling from Jessi's big confession about her feelings, Kyle has his hands full with girl troubles. While trying to figure out how to deal with Jessi, Kyle can't help but be completely jealous over Amanda's new relationship with Nate. And to top that all off, he still doesn't trust Cassidy, but doesn't have any evidence to prove his suspicions. Meanwhile, Josh and Andy hit their own rough patch as they try to deal with her family's impending move.
41	8	"Tell-Tale Heart"	Peter DeLuise	Gayle Abrams & Brian Ridings	March 2, 2009	1.297
After finding Sarah's Latnok ring in Cassidy's vault, Kyle and Jessi must deal with the implications. Determined to find out what happened to her mother, Jessi will stop at nothing to learn the truth. But when she starts to experience serious side effects, Kyle worries that the truth may do Jessi more harm than good. The pair investigate and are shocked to discover that Sarah had not abandoned Jessi and was actually murdered by Cassidy. Meanwhile, Declan forces Lori and Hillary to finally bury the hatchet, while Josh struggles to deal with Andy's impending departure.
42	9	"Guess Who's Coming to Dinner"	James Head	Daniel Arkin & Andrea Conway	March 9, 2009	1.283
Now that Kyle and Jessi know the true story of Sarah's demise, they're on the hunt to find out what Cassidy really wants from them. But in the effort to do so, Kyle must do something that doesn't come naturally to him – lie. To make Cassidy trust him and believe that he's on board with Latnok, Kyle invites Cassidy over for dinner. Jessi doesn't react well to the news of Cassidy's invite and can't imagine why Kyle would buddy up to the man who killed her mother. But when Jessi shows up unexpectedly to the dinner and things go south, Kyle, Jessi and Foss come up with a scheme to fake Jessi's death so Kyle can in turn get closer to Latnok and learn about their plans. Meanwhile, Amanda discovers Baylin's old papers in Nate's dorm. And, Josh plans the perfect evening for his last night together with Andy.
43	10	"Bringing Down the House"	Peter DeLuise	Julie Plec & Brian Young	March 16, 2009	1.662
In the series finale, Kyle gets Cassidy to open up about Latnok's plans for the future of Adam Baylin's experiment. To his horror, Kyle learns that the secret society is going ahead with a production of multiple clones of Kyle. Kyle and Jessi must find a way to put a stop to it, and he enlists the help of the Tragers, Declan, and Amanda. But with the world thinking Jessi is dead, and Kyle trying to keep up with all the lies he has told, Kyle then finds that Cassidy is his own brother.
