= The Butterfly Effect 3: Revelations =

2009 American film

- DVD cover
- Directed by: Seth Grossman
- Written by: Holly Brix
- Produced by: Anthony Rhulen; Chris Bender; J. C. Spink; A. J. Dix; Courtney Solomon
- Starring: Chris Carmack; Rachel Miner
- Cinematography: Daniel J. Stoloff
- Edited by: Ed Marx
- Music by: Adam Balazs
- Production companies: FilmEngine; BenderSpink
- Distributed by: After Dark Films; Lionsgate Films
- Release date: January 9, 2009 (After Dark Horrorfest)
- Running time: 90 minutes
- Country: United States
- Language: English
- Box office: $708,152

The Butterfly Effect 3: Revelations is a 2009 American science fiction horror film directed by Seth Grossman. It is the third installment in The Butterfly Effect franchise. The film is set in Detroit, Michigan with most of the filming done there.

The film was first screened at After Dark Horrorfest film festival before going straight-to-video, with the theatrical release occurring internationally. The film received negative reception, but critics called it a minor improvement over the previous sequel.

== Plot ==
Sam Reide witnesses a woman being killed, then awakens in an ice-filled bathtub, while his vital signs are monitored by his sister Jenna. Sam can travel back to any moment during his lifetime, with his consciousness inhabiting his younger body. He helps the police under the guise of being a psychic. Sam pays Jenna's rent and buys her groceries, as she rarely leaves the apartment and lives in squalor.

Elizabeth, the sister of Sam's murdered girlfriend Rebecca, arrives at the apartment. She found her sister’s diary while helping her parents move and believes that Lonnie Flennons, a man about to be executed for her sister's murder, is innocent, and she wants Sam to find the actual murderer. Sam meets with the man who tutored him in time travel, Goldburg, who reminds him of the cardinal rules: he is not to alter his past, nor to travel in time with his body left unsupervised. When Sam was 15, a house fire killed Jenna, but Sam altered time, saving Jenna. Sam's interference resulted in the fire killing their parents. After Goldburg leaves the bar, the bartender, Vicki, seduces Sam.

Sam agrees to help Elizabeth, and he travels back to June 6, 1998. He encounters a drunk Elizabeth and tells her to stay in her car, then finds Rebecca dead. Elizabeth is killed in her car. Sam returns to the present to learn that he no longer owns a car, no longer works for the police, and is renting out his couch. He is now a former suspect in Rebecca's murder who has repeatedly asked for the case file. He visits Lonnie, now a lawyer who needs a wheelchair. Lonnie tells Sam that on the night of the murder, he drove by, saw Elizabeth and Sam talking, and did not stop. Sam visits Goldburg, who suggests he return to the scene of the third murder but only observe. Sam also visits Jenna, who is better off and living more cleanly. She refuses to help him.

Sam travels back in time and witnesses the third victim, Anita, being attacked, but it is her boyfriend catering to her rape fantasy. Sam is discovered, and her boyfriend's punch returns him to the present, where Sam now rents a couch and faces eviction for nonpayment. Goldburg is missing, and Lonnie is now the third victim. Anita remains alive, pepper-spraying Sam in the face when he approaches her.

Jenna tells Sam that Goldburg intended to implicate him in the murders; she fears a future Sam is the murderer, and pinky-swears him to not time-travel anymore. A drunken Sam propositions Vicki, who is now engaged. After Sam leaves, the killer murders Vicki; her body is found by the police near an auto body plant. Because Sam left his bar receipt behind, he was questioned by the police. Jenna extricates him, but the police surveil him. Sam takes Detective Glenn's evidence notebook, which he uses to travel back in time to before the bodies were found.

He returns to the present to find himself on Jenna's couch as she leaves for work, reminding him to clean up after himself and have dinner ready for her return; their positions are now reversed. Sam returns to the auto plant, where the police arrest him. Sam convinces Glenn to release him by telling him that his wife mistook Glenn for MC Hammer at their first meeting. Returning home, Sam accidentally inhales some burundanga flowers, sent from Goldburg's greenhouse, and time-travels to the auto plant, finding a severely injured Goldburg. Running for help, Sam is felled by a foothold trap.

The killer approaches the trapped Sam and reveals herself to be Jenna, who also time-travels. She has an incestuous love for her brother, having killed the women either because she perceived them as rivals for Sam's affections, or because they were new witnesses, introduced by Sam's rescue attempts. Sam travels back to the day of the fire that had killed his parents; instead of saving Jenna, he traps her in her burning room. He awakens in a timeline in which he has married Elizabeth, and he, Elizabeth, and their daughter Jenna are arriving at a family barbecue, where he is greeted by his parents, Rebecca, and a healthy Goldburg. Sam's daughter Jenna puts her fashion doll on the grill and smiles as it burns.

== Cast ==
- Chris Carmack as Sam Reide
  - Michael Place as Young Sam
- Rachel Miner as Jenna Reide
  - Catherine Towne as Young Jenna
- Melissa Jones as Vicki
- Kevin Yon as Harry Goldburg
- Lynch Travis as Detective Dan Glenn
- Sarah Habel as Elizabeth Brown
- Mia Serafino as Rebecca Brown
- Hugh Maguire as Detective Jake Nicholas
- Richard Wilkinson as Lonnie Flennons
- Chantel Giacalone as Anita Barnes
- Michael D. Ellison as Anita's Boyfriend
- Ulysses Hernandez as Paco
- Linda Boston as Landlady
- Emily Sutton-Smith as Mother in the Park
- Dennis North as Sam's Father
- Trevor Callaghan as Son in the Park
- Peter Malota as Assailant in the Park
- Sonya Ayakian as Secretary
- Alexis Sturr as Sam's Daughter
- Andrea Foster as Glenn's Wife
- Daniel Spink as Prison Guard

== Production ==
The movie was filmed in Michigan and concluded filming in October 2008.

== Release ==
The film debuted as part of the lineup for After Dark Horrorfest III, a horror film festival held in January 2009.

=== Home media ===
The film was released on DVD on March 31, 2009 by Lionsgate Films. The film eventually debuted on the Blu-ray format on January 4, 2011. It was included in a double feature with another After Dark Horrorfest film, The Broken (2008).

== Critical reception ==
Reel Film Reviews characterized the 3rd installment as "A very mild improvement over the nigh unwatchable Butterfly Effect 2."

== See also ==
- List of ghost films
