= Matthew F. Leonetti =

American cinematographer

- Born: Matthew Frank Leonetti; July 31, 1941 (age 85); Los Angeles, California, U.S
- Education: Loyola Marymount University
- Years active: 1969–2014
- Relatives: John R. Leonetti (brother)

Matthew Frank Leonetti A.S.C. (born July 31, 1941) is an American cinematographer.

== Background ==
Leonetti was born in Los Angeles, California.

His younger brother, John R. Leonetti, is also a prolific cinematographer and occasional film director.

Their father Frank was a filmmaker and cinematographer, who served as a gaffer and lighting technician on low-budget films like The Violent Years, Frankenstein's Daughter, and Beyond the Time Barrier.

Leonetti is a graduate of Loyola Marymount University.

== Career ==
Leonetti began his career working on a number of projects with his father, serving as a camera operator on films like Adam at 6 A.M. and The Organization. He soon fell in with Jerry Jameson, a prolific television director who dabbled in feature films.

His debut as cinematographer was The Bat People, a low-budget horror movie directed by Jameson, on which Leonetti also served as an executive producer. Though the film came and went with little fanfare, it did gain a minor cult following years later after being featured at an episode of Mystery Science Theater 3000. Leonetti spent much of the 1970s shooting TV films directed by Jameson.

In 1979, Leonetti worked on his first big-budget theatrical film with the Academy Award-winning Breaking Away, directed by Peter Yates.

Leonetti later shot the Poltergeist, where he was responsible for creating many of the film's iconic images. This proved to be his big break, and in the following years he quickly became one of the most prolific and accomplished DPs in the film industry, shooting a large number of iconic films of the 80s.

Leonetti served as DP on his brother's directorial debut, Mortal Kombat Annihilation.

In 2000s, Leonetti shot a string of blockbusters, from thrillers to action, as well as comedy films.

== Filmography ==
=== Film ===
Year	Title	Director
1974	The Bat People (Note: Also credited as executive producer)	Jerry Jameson
1977	Mr. Billion	Jonathan Kaplan
1977	The Chicken Chronicles	Frank Simon
1977	American Raspberry	Bradley R. Swirnoff
1979	Breaking Away	Peter Yates
1980	Raise the Titanic	Jerry Jameson
1981	Eyewitness	Peter Yates
1982	Poltergeist	Tobe Hooper
1982	Fast Times at Ridgemont High	Amy Heckerling
1984	The Buddy System	Glenn Jordan
1984	The Ice Pirates	Stewart Raffill
1984	Songwriter	Alan Rudolph
1985	Fast Forward	Sidney Poitier
1985	Weird Science	John Hughes
1985	Jagged Edge	Richard Marquand
1985	Commando	Mark L. Lester
1986	Jumpin' Jack Flash	Penny Marshall
1987	Extreme Prejudice	Walter Hill
1987	Dragnet	Tom Mankiewicz
1988	Action Jackson	Craig R. Baxley
1988	Red Heat	Walter Hill
1989	Johnny Handsome	Walter Hill
1990	Hard to Kill	Bruce Malmuth
1990	Another 48 Hrs.	Walter Hill
1991	Dead Again	Kenneth Branagh
1992	Leap of Faith	Richard Pearce
1994	Angels in the Outfield	William Dear
1994	A Low Down Dirty Shame	Keenen Ivory Wayans
1995	Strange Days	Kathryn Bigelow
1996	Fled	Kevin Hooks
1996	Star Trek: First Contact	Jonathan Frakes
1997	Mortal Kombat Annihilation	John R. Leonetti
1998	Species II	Peter Medak
1998	Star Trek: Insurrection	Jonathan Frakes
2001	Along Came a Spider	Lee Tamahori
2001	Rush Hour 2	Brett Ratner
2003	2 Fast 2 Furious	John Singleton
2004	The Butterfly Effect	Eric Bress; J. Mackye Gruber
2004	Dawn of the Dead	Zack Snyder
2005	Fever Pitch	The Farrelly Brothers
2005	Santa's Slay	David Steiman
2006	Accepted	Steve Pink
2007	Pride	Sunu Gornea
2007	The Heartbreak Kid	The Farrelly Brothers
2008	What Happens in Vegas	Tom Vaughan
2008	Soul Men	Malcolm D. Lee
2011	Hall Pass	The Farrelly Brothers
2012	The Three Stooges	The Farrelly Brothers
2014	Dumb and Dumber To	The Farrelly Brothers

Short film

Year	Title	Director	Notes
2000	Bear to the Right	Matthew F. Leonetti Jr.	
2013	The Pitch	Peter Farrelly	Segments of Movie 43
2013	Truth or Dare	Peter Farrelly	Segments of Movie 43

=== Television ===
TV movies

Year	Title	Director	Notes
1974	The Elevator	Jerry Jameson	
1974	Hurricane	Jerry Jameson	
1974	Terror on the 40th Floor	Jerry Jameson	
1974	It Couldn't Happen to a Nicer Guy	Cy Howard	
1975	The Secret Night Caller	Jerry Jameson	
1975	Search for the Gods	Jud Taylor	
1975	The Deadly Tower	Jerry Jameson	
1975	The Lives of Jenny Dolan	Jerry Jameson	
1976	High Risk	Sam O'Steen	
1976	The Call of the Wild	Jerry Jameson	
1977	The Spell	Lee Philips	
1977	Flight to Holocaust	Bernard L. Kowalski	
1977	The Hostage Heart	Bernard McEveety	
1978	Superdome	Jerry Jameson	
1978	Ruby and Oswald	Mel Stuart	
1978	Special Olympics	Lee Philips	With John V. LaBarbera
1978	The Comedy Company	Lee Philips	
1978	A Fire in the Sky	Jerry Jameson	
1979	The Triangle Factory Fire Scandal	Mel Stuart	
1979	Willa	Joan Darling; Claudio Guzmán	
1979	Son-Rise: A Miracle of Love	Glenn Jordan	
1980	Turnover Smith	Bernard L. Kowalski	
1981	Crazy Times	Lee Philips	
1981	Stand By Your Man	Jerry Jameson	
1982	Mae West	Lee Philips	
1982	Hotline	Jerry Jameson	
1982	E.T. and Friends: Magical Movie Visitors	Malcolm Leo; Andrew Solt	Documentary film
1983	Happy	Lee Philips	
1986	American Geisha	Lee Philips	
1986	Under the Influence	Thomas Carter	
1988	Secret Witness	Eric Laneuville	

TV series

Year	Title	Director	Notes
1975	Bronk	Richard Donner	Episode "Pilot"
1976	Jigsaw John	Allen Reisner; Reza Badiyi; Charles S. Dubin	3 episodes
1978	The American Girls	Lee Philips	Episode "The Phoenix Connection"
1982	Tucker's Witch	Peter H. Hunt	Episode "The Good Witch of Laurel Canyon"
1983	Lottery!	Lee Philips	Episode "Being a Winner"
1984	Jessie	Richard Michaels	Episode "Pilot"
2008	Unhitched	The Farrelly Brothers	Episode "Pilot"

== Bibliography ==
- Kay Weniger: Das große Personenlexikon des Films, Band 4, Page 690, Berlin (2001) ISBN 3-89602-340-3

== Awards and nominations ==
Year	Award	Category	Title	Result	Ref.
1995	Chicago Film Critics Association	Best Cinematography	Strange Days	Nominated	
2015	American Society of Cinematographers	President's Award		Won	
