= Michael Suby =

American screenwriter

- Born: United States
- Occupations: Television and film score composer, music producer
- Known for: The Butterfly Effect; Keeping Up with the Kardashians; The Vampire Diaries Universe; Pretty Little Liars

Michael 'Mike' Suby is an American television and film score composer and music producer. He graduated from the Berklee College of Music in Boston, Massachusetts in 2000.

== Filmography ==
=== Film ===
Year	Title	Director	Notes
2003	Streets of Legend	Joey Curtis	—N/a
2003	The Real Cancun	Rick de Oliveira	—N/a
2003	The Duff Challenge	Brian Canning; Doug Chernack	Television film
2004	The Butterfly Effect	Eric Bress; J. Mackye Gruber	—N/a
2004	Able Edwards	Graham Robertson	—N/a
2004	Handshake	Patrick Smith	Short film
2005	The Zodiac	Alexander Bulkley	—N/a
2005	Tamara	Jeremy Haft	—N/a
2006	The Butterfly Effect 2	John R. Leonetti	—N/a
2007	Home of the Giants	Rusty Gorman	—N/a
2009	Kill Theory	Chris Moore	—N/a
2009	The Shortcut	Nicholaus Goossen	—N/a
2015	The Courier	J. Mackye Gruber	Short film
2019	The Weight of Success	M. Douglas Silverstein	Short film

=== Television ===
Year	Title	Notes
2005	The Simple Life	Episode: "Mortuary" (Season 3, Episode 4)
2005	The Scholar	6 episodes
2005–2009	Robot Chicken	23 episodes and specials titled "Robot Chicken: Star Wars" and "Robot Chicken: Star Wars Episode II"
2006–2009	Kyle XY	43 episodes
2007	Keeping Up with the Kardashians	8 episodes
2008	Living Lohan	9 episodes
2009	Models of the Runway	—N/a
2009–2010	Make It or Break It	21 episodes
2009–2010	Kourtney and Kim Take Miami	16 episodes
2009–2017	The Vampire Diaries	171 episodes
2010–2015	Project Runway	109 episodes
2010–2017	Pretty Little Liars	160 episodes
2011	After the Runway	4 episodes
2012–2014	Project Runway All Stars	35 episodes
2013–2014	Ravenswood	10 episodes Composed with Joel J. Richard
2013–2018	The Originals	92 episodes
2014	Under the Gunn	12 episodes
2015	Becoming Us	10 episodes
2016	Containment	3 episodes
2017–2018	Famous in Love	20 episodes
2018	American Woman	3 episodes Composed with John Swihart
2018–2022	Legacies	68 episodes
2018–2020	God Friended Me	42 episodes
2019–2021	Roswell, New Mexico	39 episodes Composed with Dennis Smith
2019	Pretty Little Liars: The Perfectionists	10 episodes
2025	We Were Liars	8 episodes

=== Web ===
Year	Title	Notes
2020	Twentyfiveish	5 episodes
