= Ghosts of War (2020 film) =

2020 horror film

- Theatrical release poster
- Directed by: Eric Bress
- Written by: Eric Bress
- Produced by: D. Todd Shepherd; Shelley Madison; Joe Simpson
- Starring: Brenton Thwaites; Theo Rossi; Skylar Astin; Kyle Gallner; Alan Ritchson; Billy Zane; Shaun Toub
- Cinematography: Lorenzo Senatore
- Edited by: Peter Amundson
- Music by: Michael Suby
- Production companies: Miscellaneous Entertainment; Highland Film Group; Ingenious Media
- Distributed by: Vertical Entertainment
- Release date: June 18, 2020
- Running time: 94 minutes
- Country: United Kingdom
- Language: English
- Box office: $345,289

Ghosts of War is a 2020 British supernatural horror war film written and directed by Eric Bress. The film stars Brenton Thwaites, Theo Rossi, Skylar Astin, Kyle Gallner, and Alan Ritchson. It was released on DirecTV on 18 June 2020.

In the film, five American soldiers are assigned to guard a French chateau during the Second World War, where they encounter the vengeful ghosts of a murdered family. As the haunting intensifies, the soldiers are forced to confront a traumatic event from their own past.

== Plot ==
As the Allied armies advance through France in 1944, five soldiers of the United States' 82nd Airborne Division are assigned to guard a chateau. En route to the chateau they ambush German soldiers operating a captured American jeep and leave no survivors. As they proceed with the mission they encounter a group of Jewish refugees. They relieve the American guards at the chateau, who leave hurriedly. Chris, commanding the guard, identifies a repetitive banging coming from the fireplace as a message in Morse code which Eugene translates as "I have no legs".

Eugene finds a journal kept by a German soldier detailing the fate of the chateau's owners, the Helwigs, who were brutally murdered by the Germans for sheltering Jews. The father was burned alive, the daughter was hanged and the son was drowned in a bathtub. As Eugene transcribes another Morse code message, his hand moves involuntarily to spell out the message "If you leave, you die".

A German patrol attacks during the night, and though they are defeated, Butchie is mortally wounded diving on a grenade. The men witness some of the Germans being killed by unseen forces in the same manner as the Helwigs. Before he dies, Butchie rants that what the men are experiencing isn't real and exhorts Chris to "remember".

Convinced the building is haunted, the survivors leave, but repeat the experiences of their trip to the chateau, including the ambush of the jeep and the encounter with the refugees. Believing they're cursed and that their only hope is to bury the bodies of the Helwigs, they return to the chateau. An invisible force hauls Chris toward an outhouse where the Helwigs' remains are revealed.

After burying the bodies, Eugene consults the journal, finding the text is no longer German but Arabic and that the Helwigs were Afghan. The men are then attacked by spirits, one of which tries to drown Chris. The shock of the experience induces hallucinations and when he revives he's being attended by doctors in a futuristic hospital, surrounded by his badly injured and unconscious comrades. Doctor Engel and his staff inform Chris they had been experiencing a simulated reality based on World War II intended to help soldiers suffering from post-traumatic stress disorder.

Chris realizes he and his men are not fighting World War II but are soldiers of the present-day American military. Their final mission in Afghanistan was to evacuate a family called the Helwigs, who had been collaborating with the Americans, before an Islamic State patrol ambushed them. Ordered to hide by their CIA handler, they watched as the Helwigs were slaughtered in the manner witnessed in the simulation. As the men left, the despairing mother of the family detonated a suicide bomb, and with her dying breath uttered the word "Vetrulek", an ancient curse forcing its recipients to endlessly relive their trauma.

The hospital's power fluctuates, confusing the medical staff and convincing Chris the curse is real. The spirits of the Helwig family now haunt the simulation that the men are experiencing. Chris tells the staff the only way to lift the curse is to confront the family, apologise and atone for their sins, and insists on returning to the simulation. While the medical staff prepare Chris' reconnection, they discover the mainframe computer is deleting the patients' memory. They warn Chris just before the countdown to the link reaches five seconds. The timer reaches zero and Chris awakens where his simulated experiences began, in a night-time bivouac with his comrades while a figure watches from the shadows.

== Cast ==
- Brenton Thwaites as Lieutenant Chris
- Kyle Gallner as Private Tappert
- Alan Ritchson as Private Butchie
- Theo Rossi as Private Kirk
- Skylar Astin as Corporal Eugene
- Billy Zane as Dr Engel
- Shaun Toub as Mr Helwig
- Alexander Behrang Keshtkar as Leader
- Kaloyan Hristov as Helwig Boy
- Yanitsa Mihailova as Christina Helwig

== Production ==
In February 2017, it was reported that Brenton Thwaites would star in Ghosts of War, with Bress directing from his own script. Miscellaneous Entertainment's D. Todd Shepherd, Shelley Madison, Joe Simpson, and George Waud are producing and financing the film alongside Colleen Camp. A month later, Skylar Astin, Theo Rossi, Alan Ritchson, Kyle Gallner, and Shaun Toub were cast in the film.

Highland Film Group is handling international sales. Principal photography took place in Sofia, Bulgaria. Using the Vrana Palace as the mansion.

== Release ==
Ghosts of War released on DirecTV on 18 June 2020. It was released via virtual cinema screenings, On Demand, and digitally on 17 July 2020.

== Reception ==
On the review aggregator website Rotten Tomatoes, 38% of 40 critics' reviews are positive. The website's consensus reads: "Ghosts of War blends supernatural horror and period war drama to produce a muddled mashup that proves some ingredients are better left separate." Metacritic, which uses a weighted average, assigned the film a score of 38 out of 100, based on 8 critics, indicating "generally unfavorable" reviews.

On The Times, Kevin Maher rated it 3/5, writing that "you'll be pleasantly surprised - but you probably won't watch it again." On Bloody Disgusting, Meagan Navarro rated it 1/5 "skulls", writing that is "a by the numbers haunted house story with generic scares (...) Baffling tonal shifts exacerbate these moments of trope horror."
