= Heather Knight (journalist) =

American journalist

- Education: Stanford University
- Occupation: Journalist
- Employer(s): San Francisco Chronicle, New York Times

Heather Knight is an American journalist. She worked for the San Francisco Chronicle for over two decades, before starting as The New York Times San Francisco bureau chief in September 2023.

== Career ==
Knight began working at the San Francisco Chronicle in 1999 as an intern. She was then hired as a general assignment reporter, and later covered San Francisco Unified School District before being assigned to City Hall. She was named city columnist in 2017, replacing C.W. Nevius. While at the SF Chronicle, Knight's reporting covered local politics and issues such as homelessness, the housing crisis, and fentanyl. She also hosts the TotalSF podcast with Peter Hartlaub.

At the 2022 California Journalism Awards, Knight won first place for her columns, and her feature story with photographer Gabrielle Lurie about a woman's struggle to get help for her fentanyl-addicted daughter won the best print feature. Later that year, she won a Scripps Howard Award for Excellence in Opinion Writing.

In October 2022, Knight broke the story of the $1.7 million budget approved by assemblymember Matt Haney for a single Noe Valley public toilet. Knight's reporting led to California governor Gavin Newsom withholding the funds, and the project was eventually replaced with a cheaper option.

In July 2023, it was announced that she would be starting as the San Francisco bureau chief for The New York Times in September 2023, replacing Thomas Fuller.
