= Final Destination =

American horror franchise

- Official franchise logo
- Created by: Jeffrey Reddick
- Original work: Final Destination (2000)
- Owner: Warner Bros. Entertainment
- Years: 2000–present

Print publications
- Novels: List of novels
- Comics: Final Destination: Sacrifice (2006); Final Destination: Spring Break (2006)

Films and television
- Films: Final Destination (2000); Final Destination 2 (2003); Final Destination 3 (2006); The Final Destination (2009); Final Destination 5 (2011); Final Destination Bloodlines (2025)

Audio
- Soundtrack: Final Destination (2000)

Final Destination is an American horror franchise owned by Warner Bros. Entertainment through New Line Cinema. It includes six films, nine novels, and two comic books. It is based on an unused spec script by Jeffrey Reddick, originally written for the television series The X-Files. The series follows groups of people who survive a disaster after an individual has a premonition of the event. They are then killed one by one in elaborate accidents caused by an unseen force known as Death while the survivors try to escape their predetermined fate. A seventh film is in early development.

In addition to the films, a novel series consisting of six original stories and novelizations of the first three films was published throughout 2005 and 2006 by Black Flame. A one-shot comic book titled Final Destination: Sacrifice was released alongside select DVDs of Final Destination 3 in 2006, and a comic book series titled Final Destination: Spring Break was published by Zenescope Entertainment in 2007.

The franchise has been praised for its innovative premise, with Death itself being a villain instead of the usual slasher figure, and the creativity of the convoluted yet tense death sequences.

== Background ==
Final Destination was written by Jeffrey Reddick after having "read a story about a woman who was on vacation and her mom called her and said, 'Don't take the flight tomorrow, I have a really bad feeling about it'". The woman switched flights, and the plane she was originally supposed to take crashed. Originally having written the script as an episode of The X-Files, Reddick decided to turn the script into a feature-length film at the behest of one of his New Line Cinema colleagues. After developing the feature idea, New Line Cinema hired Reddick to write a screenplay; James Wong and Glen Morgan were later brought on board to write the shooting script, making alterations to comply with their standards. Jeffrey Reddick has sole story credit and shares screenplay credit with James Wong and Glen Morgan.

== Films ==
Title	Release date	Director(s)	Screenwriter(s)	Story by	Producers
Final Destination	March 17, 2000	James Wong	James Wong, Glen Morgan & Jeffrey Reddick	Jeffrey Reddick	Glen Morgan, Craig Perry & Warren Zide
Final Destination 2	January 31, 2003	David R. Ellis	Eric Bress & J. Mackye Gruber	Eric Bress, Jeffrey Reddick & J. Mackye Gruber	Craig Perry & Warren Zide
Final Destination 3	February 10, 2006	James Wong	James Wong & Glen Morgan		James Wong, Glen Morgan, Craig Perry & Warren Zide
The Final Destination	August 28, 2009	David R. Ellis	Eric Bress		Craig Perry & Warren Zide
Final Destination 5	August 12, 2011	Steven Quale	Eric Heisserer		Craig Perry & Warren Zide
Final Destination Bloodlines	May 16, 2025	Adam Stein & Zach Lipovsky	Guy Busick & Lori Evans Taylor	Jon Watts, Guy Busick & Lori Evans Taylor	Jon Watts, Craig Perry, Toby Emmerich, Dianne McGunigle & Sheila Hanahan Taylor
Untitled seventh Final Destination film	May 12, 2028	Michiel Blanchart	Lori Evans Taylor	TBA	TBA

=== Final Destination (2000) ===
Final Destination features high school student Alex Browning (Devon Sawa), who boards Volée Airlines Flight 180 with his classmates for a field trip to Paris. Before take-off, Alex has a premonition that the plane will explode in mid-air, killing everyone on board. When the events from his vision begin to repeat themselves in reality, he panics, and a fight breaks out, which leads to several passengers being left behind, including Clear Rivers (Ali Larter), Carter Horton (Kerr Smith), Billy Hitchcock (Seann William Scott), Valerie Lewton (Kristen Cloke), Terry Chaney (Amanda Detmer), and Tod Waggner (Chad Donella), who witness the plane explode moments later. However, their survival disrupted Death's design to have them die in the Flight 180 explosion, an act also known as cheating Death. As a result, Death created a new design to kill them one by one in bizarre accidents. Eventually, Alex, Clear and Carter travel to Paris to celebrate their survival, but when Alex suddenly witnesses Carter being crushed by a giant neon sign, they realize that Death is not finished with them.

=== Final Destination 2 (2003) ===
Final Destination 2, picking up one year after the first film, features college student Kimberly Corman (A. J. Cook) heading to Daytona Beach for spring break with her friends Shaina, Dano, and Frankie (Sarah Carter, Alex Rae, and Shaun Sipos). En route, Kimberly has a premonition of a huge pile-up on Route 23, killing everyone involved. She stops her SUV on the entrance ramp, preventing several people from entering the highway, including Thomas Burke (Michael Landes), Eugene Dix (T. C. Carson), Rory Peters (Jonathan Cherry), Kat Jennings (Keegan Connor Tracy), Nora and Tim Carpenter (Lynda Boyd and James Kirk), Evan Lewis (David Paetkau), and pregnant Isabella Hudson (Justina Machado). While Officer Burke questions Kimberly, the pile-up occurs as she predicted. Like the previous film, the survivors have cheated Death by escaping their intended fate. However, this time, Death targets them in reverse order, as their survival disrupted the pattern set by the deaths of the Flight 180 victims, creating "loose ends" that Death is now determined to correct. Kimberly also teams up with Clear Rivers, the remaining survivor of Flight 180, to save the rest and eventually realizes that "only new life can defeat Death". This involves trying to kill oneself and being revived afterwards, which Kimberly does, saving her and Officer Burke, who was next on Death's list.

=== Final Destination 3 (2006) ===
Final Destination 3 has high school student Wendy Christensen (Mary Elizabeth Winstead) visiting an amusement park for grad night with her friends Kevin Fischer (Ryan Merriman), Jason Wise (Jesse Moss), and Carrie Dreyer (Gina Holden). As Wendy and her friends board the Devil's Flight roller coaster, Wendy has a premonition that the ride will crash, killing everyone on board. When Wendy panics a fight breaks out and several people leave or are forced off the ride before the accident occurs, including Kevin, Wendy's younger sister Julie (Amanda Crew), and students Ian McKinley (Kris Lemche), Erin Ulmer (Alexz Johnson), Lewis Romero (Texas Battle), Frankie Cheeks (Sam Easton), Ashley Freund (Chelan Simmons), Ashlyn Halperin (Crystal Lowe), and Perry Malinowski (Maggie Ma). When the survivors start to die one by one in a series of strange accidents, Wendy and Kevin set out to save those who remain after they learn of the events of the first two films. They also figure out that the photographs they took at the park have hints of their deaths. Most of their attempts are futile, with the exception of Julie and themselves, leading them to believe they have cheated Death. However, the three "coincidentally" cross paths five months later and are caught in a horrifying subway accident.

=== The Final Destination (2009) ===
In The Final Destination, college student Nick O'Bannon (Bobby Campo) visits the McKinley Speedway for a study break with his friends Lori Milligan (Shantel VanSanten), Janet Cunningham (Haley Webb), and Hunt Wynorski (Nick Zano). While watching the race, Nick has a premonition that a crash will send debris into the grandstand, causing the stadium to collapse on the spectators. As he panics, a fight breaks out, prompting several people to leave before the disaster occurs. Among them are his friends Lori, Janet, and Hunt, security guard George Lanter (Mykelti Williamson), and fellow spectators Andy Kewzer (Andrew Fiscella), Samantha Lane (Krista Allen), Jonathan Groves (Jackson Walker), Carter Daniels (Justin Welborn), and Nadia Monroy (Stephanie Honoré). Once again, the survivors begin to die in a series of strange accidents until Janet is rescued moments before her death. Janet's survival leads the remaining survivors to believe that they have cheated Death until Nick has another premonition of a disastrous explosion at a shopping mall, which he manages to prevent, saving himself, Lori, and Janet. Two weeks later, Nick realizes that the mall disaster vision was merely a distraction, intended to lead them to the place where Death truly planned to strike, and all three are killed when a runaway semi crashes into them.

=== Final Destination 5 (2011) ===
In Final Destination 5, Sam Lawton (Nicholas D'Agosto) is on his way to a corporate retreat with his colleagues. While they cross the North Bay Bridge, Sam has a premonition that the bridge will collapse, killing everyone on it. Sam manages to persuade several of his co-workers to get off the bridge before the accident occurs, including Molly Harper (Emma Bell), Nathan Sears (Arlen Escarpeta), Peter Friedkin (Miles Fisher), Dennis Lapman (David Koechner), Olivia Castle (Jacqueline MacInnes Wood), Isaac Palmer (P. J. Byrne), and Candice Hooper (Ellen Wroe). After Candice and Isaac die in bizarre accidents, Sam learns that Death is targeting them for surviving the bridge collapse. He is also told that survival is possible by claiming the remaining lifespan of another person. Olivia and Dennis are killed before they can act, but Nathan unintentionally claims a co-worker's lifespan during a workplace argument. Peter, jealous that Molly survived instead of Candice, tries to kill her. He ends up taking the life of an investigating agent, gaining his lifespan, but Sam kills him before he can harm Molly. Later, Sam and Molly board a flight to Paris, which is revealed to be Flight 180 from the first film. When the engine explodes and the fuselage is torn apart, Molly is sucked out of the plane, and Sam dies in the explosion. Meanwhile, the landing gear crashes into a cocktail bar in New York City, killing Nathan, as the co-worker whose lifespan he claimed had a terminal illness and was expected to die "any day now".

=== Final Destination Bloodlines (2025) ===
Final Destination Bloodlines takes place in 1969 and 2024. In 1969, young Iris Campbell (Brec Bassinger) and her fiancé Paul (Max Lloyd-Jones) go to the opening event of the Sky View Restaurant. She has a premonition that the tower will collapse, and as everybody runs for their lives, a series of chain reactions kills them. As the premonition ends, college student Stefani Reyes (Kaitlyn Santa Juana) is plagued, in 2024, by visions of her grandmother Iris's (Gabrielle Rose) premonition. She goes home to seek answers and is greeted by her father, Marty (Tinpo Lee), and her brother, Charlie (Teo Briones). She later travels to Iris's cabin, where her grandmother hands her a notebook she created containing everything she has learned about Death's intent to kill all the Sky View survivors and their descendants. Iris allows Death to claim her to prove her claims to Stefani. Howard (Alex Zahara) and Julia (Anna Lore) are next to die. When Stefani and her remaining family members track down another survivor, "JB", at a hospital morgue, it is revealed that he is William Bludworth. Bludworth claims he is the last survivor of the Sky View disaster and will be the next to die once Stefani's family is killed. Stefani's cousins Erik (Richard Harmon) and Bobby (Owen Joyner) die in a freak mishap at the hospital. Charlie and Stefani head with their mother, Darlene (Rya Kihlstedt), to Iris's cabin so their mother may hide from Death. She is killed outside the cabin shortly before Charlie saves his sister from drowning by resuscitating her. A week later, while preparing for her brother's prom night, Stefani—whose heart did not stop when she drowned—and Charlie are crushed by logs that fly from a freight train that derails nearby.

=== Future ===
Stein noted that the narrative potential remains open-ended, stating: "Death's work is never done. There are always more scores to settle." He acknowledged, though, that the creative process takes several years. Perry also expressed openness to continuing the franchise, noting that Bloodlines has expanded the creative flexibility of the series. In August 2025, it was announced that a seventh movie in the franchise was in the works, with Taylor returning to write the script. In October 2025, it was announced that Michiel Blanchart would direct the seventh installment. On April 14, 2026, Warner Bros. revealed that the seventh film was scheduled to be released on May 12, 2028.

== Recurring cast and characters ==
List indicators

This section includes characters who will appear or have appeared in more than two films in the series.

- An empty grey cell indicates the character was not in the film, or that the character's official presence has not yet been confirmed.
- ^{Y} indicates a younger version of the character.

Character	Films					
Character	Final Destination	Final Destination 2	Final Destination 3	The Final Destination	Final Destination 5	Final Destination Bloodlines
Character	2000	2003	2006	2009	2011	2025
Clear Rivers	Ali Larter	Ali Larter				
William "JB" Bludworth	Tony Todd	Tony Todd			Tony Todd	Tony Todd Jayden Oniah^{Y}

== Additional crew and production details ==
Film	Crew/detail					
Film	Composer	Cinematographer	Editor	Production companies	Distributor	Running time
Final Destination	Shirley Walker	Robert McLachlan	James Coblentz	New Line Cinema; Zide-Perry Productions; Hard Eight Pictures	New Line Cinema	1 hr 38 mins
Final Destination 2	Shirley Walker	Gary Capo	Eric Sears	New Line Cinema; Zide-Perry Productions	New Line Cinema	1 hr 30 mins
Final Destination 3	Shirley Walker	Robert McLachlan	Chris G. Willingham	New Line Cinema; Hard Eight Pictures; Practical Pictures; Matinee Pictures; Zide-Perry Productions	New Line Cinema	1 hr 33 mins
The Final Destination	Score by: Brian Tyler Themes by: Shirley Walker	Glen MacPherson	Mark Stevens	New Line Cinema; Practical Pictures; Parallel Zide; Zide-Perry Productions	Warner Bros. Pictures	1 hr 22 mins
Final Destination 5	Score by: Brian Tyler Themes by: Shirley Walker	Brian Pearson	Eric Sears	New Line Cinema; Zide-Perry Productions; Practical Pictures; Zide Pictures; Jellystone Films	Warner Bros. Pictures	1 hr 32 mins
Final Destination Bloodlines	Score by: Tim Wynn Themes by: Shirley Walker	Christian Sebaldt	Sabrina Pitre	New Line Cinema; Practical Pictures; Freshman Year; Fireside Films	Warner Bros. Pictures	1 hr 50 mins

== Reception ==
=== Box office performance ===
Final Destination, when compared to other top-grossing American horror franchises and adjusting for inflation from 2011, is the tenth highest grossing horror franchise in the United States with over $401 million domestically. With $985 million in worldwide earnings, the franchise is New Line's third most lucrative horror franchise, behind The Conjuring franchise ($2 billion) and the It series ($1 billion).

Film	Release date	Budget	Box office gross			References
Film	Release date	Budget	North America	Outside North America	Worldwide	References
Final Destination	March 17, 2000	$23 million	$53,331,147	$59,549,147	$112,880,294	
Final Destination 2	January 31, 2003	$26 million	$46,961,214	$43,979,915	$90,941,129	
Final Destination 3	February 10, 2006	$25 million	$54,098,051	$64,792,221	$118,890,272	
The Final Destination	August 28, 2009	$40 million	$66,477,700	$120,906,927	$187,384,627	
Final Destination 5	August 12, 2011	$40 million	$42,587,643	$115,300,000	$157,887,643	
Final Destination Bloodlines	May 16, 2025	$50 million	$138,254,739	$179,600,000	$317,854,739	
Total		$204 million	$401,710,494	$584,128,210	$985,838,704	

=== Critical and public response ===
The franchise has been praised for its innovative premise of the invisible abstract concept of Death killing people instead of a usual slasher killer, and the creativity of the films' death sequences.

Film	Rotten Tomatoes	Metacritic	CinemaScore
Final Destination	50% (163 reviews)	39 (28 reviews)	B−
Final Destination 2	52% (114 reviews)	38 (25 reviews)	B+
Final Destination 3	44% (117 reviews)	43 (28 reviews)	B+
The Final Destination	28% (98 reviews)	30 (14 reviews)	C
Final Destination 5	64% (137 reviews)	50 (24 reviews)	B+
Final Destination Bloodlines	92% (234 reviews)	73 (35 reviews)	B+

== Other media ==
=== Novels ===
Throughout 2005, publishing company Black Flame released a series of Final Destination books which faithfully follow the premise of the films, with each involving a group of people who find themselves targeted by Death after surviving a catastrophe of some sort due to a character experiencing a precognitive vision. Their first five novels all featured original stories, with the first novel, entitled Dead Reckoning, following a punk rocker Jessica Golden who saves herself and several others from the collapse of Club Kitty in Los Angeles, earning Death's ire. Destination Zero, also set in Los Angeles, has magazine employee Patricia Fuller and few others survive a train bombing and afterward, while being stalked by Death, Patti learns this is not the first time her family has been hunted by the entity. End of the Line has a group of New York City subway crash survivors, led by twins Danny and Louise King, trying to escape Death, who uses an unknowing agent to hasten its acquisition of the survivors. In Dead Man's Hand a group meant to die in the crash of a Las Vegas glass elevator are stalked by both Death and the FBI, the latter believing the group's savior Allie Goodwin-Gaines was responsible for the elevator crash. Looks Could Kill has beautiful New York model Stephanie "Sherry" Pulaski stopping her friends from boarding a yacht when she has a vision of it exploding, but is left horribly disfigured and comatose by flying debris moments afterward when her vision comes true; eventually awakening the embittered Stephanie makes a deal with Death, aiding it in claiming her friends in exchange for having her good looks restored.

After the run of the original series of books, Black Flame released novelizations of the first three films in January 2006. Black Flame's last Final Destination novel was Death of the Senses released in mid-2006. Taking place in New York, the book has a homeless man named Jack Curtis saving policewoman Amy Tom from a maniac after having a vision of Amy's death; Amy's attacker is later revealed to be a serial killer who was meant to murder six other people (representing the first five senses and a sixth) who Death begins targeting as Jack and Amy rush to find and warn the intended victims. It was, due to a printing error, only available for a short period of time before being recalled, leaving only a few copies in circulation. A tenth novel, titled Wipeout and written by Alex Johnson, was planned, but cancelled; the book would have featured a pair of surfers and several others, after surviving a plane crash in Hawaii, being hunted by Death and the survivor of another disaster, an unstable soldier who had nearly died in an ambush in Afghanistan.

=== Comic books ===
The first Final Destination comic book, titled Sacrifice, was published by Zenescope Entertainment and came packaged with a limited edition DVD of Final Destination 3, sold exclusively at Circuit City stores in 2006. The premise of the story involves the survivor of a terrible accident and his friend Jim, who continually experiences images of other people's deaths, isolating himself from the rest of the world to escape the visions that torment him. In the same year, Zenescope later released a five issue miniseries, titled Final Destination: Spring Break, which involves a group led by Carly Hagan being stalked by Death after surviving a hotel fire and becoming stranded in Cancún, Mexico. The miniseries was later released in a trade paperback collection in 2007, which included the Sacrifice comic as bonus content.

== Themes ==
Three critical theories about the Final Destination franchise have been discussed in scholarly works. It has been framed as a postmodern horror franchise that, like the Scream franchise, self-consciously refers to the history of horror cinema and rewards viewers for their knowledge. Second, the films—particularly The Final Destination (2009) and Final Destination 5 (2011)—have been examined for their visual effects. Third, the franchise has been criticized for being cynical and reductive. For example, film studies scholar Reynold Humphries dismisses the franchise as "obscurantist nonsense whose only 'idea' is that death is an agency that has a 'plan' for each of us".

According to media studies scholar Eugenie Brinkema, Final Destination films are characterized by their move away from the typical horror antagonist and toward the certainty and inevitability of death. This makes them inconsistent with most other horror films, which require a monster. Final Destination films depart further from other horror films, even those aimed at teenagers, in that a family narrative is lacking, and there are no hauntings of any kind. As well, there is no sexuality—"neither the pursuit of pleasure in the slasher convention of easy bodily access nor the monstrosity of sexual difference". Brinkema argues the films are not about seeking pleasure like typical slasher films. Instead they are about the avoidance of pain and death; they are fundamentally "bitter ... paranoid, and sad" and display the inability of characters to feel pleasure. In these films, death becomes its own cause. The premonition of the roller coaster derailment in Final Destination 3 is without context or cause. The avoidance of death by some characters grounds the necessity of their deaths, specifically the order in which they would have died on the roller coaster. Thus, "Death's list" or "Death's design" is realized. Final Destination 3 spends as much time interpreting deaths as displaying them. Wendy's close analysis of photographs allows her to understand the deaths, but is inevitably too late to save her friends. In the franchise's films, Brinkema says, "one must closely read to survive (for a spell), and yet reading changes absolutely nothing at all". Thus, the characters "might as well" have stayed on the roller coaster.

Ian Conrich, a film studies scholar, argues the series marks a key departure from slasher norms in that death itself becomes the villain. Final Destination films draw influences from slasher cinema, but the franchise's action sequences, including Final Destination 3's roller coaster derailment, draw from action and disaster cinema. For Conrich, the franchise marks a new slasher film subgenre. Because the deaths are extremely violent and excessive, any number can happen at once, and all of them are inevitable, he calls the films "grand slashers". Other grand slashers include the films in the Saw and Cube franchises.

A notable feature of the Final Destination films is the threshold or tipping-point logic of characters' deaths. Conrich frames the complex death sequences in Final Destination films as "death games, contraptions or puzzles in which there are only losers". He compares the sequences to Rube Goldberg machines, the Grand Guignol, and the Mouse Trap board game. Brinkema selects the deaths of Ashley and Ashlyn from Final Destination 3 as epitomizing the series' death sequences. The characters' deaths are brought about by "a series of neutral gestures, a set of constraints that will ultimately lead to their conflagratory ends"; these include the placing of a drink, looking through CDs, and an ill-chosen doorstop. The scene uses logics of temperature, color, and light to realize the characters' deaths and to allow Wendy to recognize the threat they face. An example of the "literal tipping point" at which the characters can no longer escape occurs when a coat rack is knocked onto the tanning beds; it is blown by an air conditioning unit that is activated by the increasing heat. Conrich identifies the roller coaster derailment as an example of the franchise's focus on mobility in death sequences. He argues that theme park rides and horror cinema are mutually influential; the former draw from the frightening aspects of the latter, while the latter draw from the "theatrics and kinetics" of the former.

== Bibliography ==
- Brinkema, Eugenie (2015). "Design Terminable and Interminable: The Possibility of Death in Final Destination". Journal of Visual Culture. 14 (3): 298–310. doi:10.1177/1470412915607923. S2CID 170279080.
- Conrich, Ian (2015). "Puzzles, Contraptions and the Highly Elaborate Moment: The Inevitability of Death in the Grand Slasher Narratives of the Final Destination and Saw Series of Films". In Clayton, Wickham (ed.). Style and Form in the Hollywood Slasher Film. Basingstoke, United Kingdom: Palgrave Macmillan. pp. 106–17. doi:10.1057/97811374964788 (inactive July 1, 2025). ISBN 9781137496478.
- Humphries, Reynold (2002). The American Horror Film: An Introduction. Edinburgh, United Kingdom: Edinburgh University Press. ISBN 9780748614165.
