= Final Destination 2 =

2003 American supernatural horror film

- Theatrical release poster
- Directed by: David R. Ellis
- Screenplay by: J. Mackye Gruber; Eric Bress
- Story by: J. Mackye Gruber; Eric Bress; Jeffrey Reddick
- Based on: Characters by Jeffrey Reddick
- Produced by: Warren Zide; Craig Perry
- Starring: Ali Larter; A. J. Cook; Michael Landes
- Cinematography: Gary Capo
- Edited by: Eric Sears
- Music by: Shirley Walker
- Production company: Zide/Perry Productions
- Distributed by: New Line Cinema
- Release date: January 31, 2003
- Running time: 90 minutes
- Country: United States
- Language: English
- Budget: $26 million
- Box office: $90.9 million

Final Destination 2 is a 2003 American supernatural horror film directed by David R. Ellis from a screenplay by J. Mackye Gruber and Eric Bress, based on a story by Gruber, Bress, and Jeffrey Reddick. It is a sequel to Final Destination (2000) and the second installment in the Final Destination film series. The film stars Ali Larter, A. J. Cook, and Michael Landes. The film follows a young woman who saves a group of drivers from a highway pile-up, which she predicted from a premonition. She must find ways to defeat Death after the survivors begin dying in freak accidents.

After the financial success of Final Destination, New Line Cinema contacted Reddick regarding plans for a sequel. Since the original film's crew was unavailable, New Line replaced most of the production team. Filming took place in Vancouver and Okanagan Lake.

Final Destination 2 was released on January 31, 2003. The film received mixed reviews from critics. It grossed $46 million domestically and $43 million overseas, earning $90 million internationally against a $26 million budget. It was also nominated for four awards, including the Saturn Award for Best Horror Film. The highway scene was called the "greatest car crash scene in movie history" and was nominated for the MTV Movie Award for Best Action Sequence. A third film, Final Destination 3, was released in February 2006.

== Plot ==
One year after the explosion of Flight 180, (Note: As depicted in Final Destination (2000)) college student Kimberly Corman is heading to Daytona Beach, Florida, for spring break with her friends Shaina, Dano, and Frankie. On the entrance ramp to U.S. Route 23, she has a premonition of a deadly pile-up caused by a logging truck. Kimberly stalls her car and steps out, preventing eight people from entering Route 23: state trooper Thomas Burke, high school teacher Eugene Dix, stoner Rory Peters, businesswoman Kat Jennings, widowed mother Nora Carpenter and her fifteen-year-old son Tim, lottery winner Evan Lewis, and pregnant delivery driver Isabella Hudson. As Burke questions Kimberly, the pile-up occurs, and a car carrier crashes into Kimberly's car, killing Shaina, Dano, and Frankie. Burke pulls Kimberly away from the crash in time, saving her life.

The survivors return to their respective homes, where a fire escape ladder fatally impales Evan when he attempts to flee from a stovetop fire in his apartment. Sensing Death's presence, Kimberly seeks help from Clear Rivers, who has hidden from Death in a psychiatric ward after Alex Browning was killed by a falling brick, making her the last survivor of Flight 180. Clear tells Kimberly that their survival provoked Death to kill them in the order they would have died at Route 23 but concludes that Death must be working backwards since Kimberly's friends died before Evan – while Kimberly survived because of Burke's intervention – unlike in Kimberly's premonition, where they all died after Evan. Clear also tells Kimberly to look for omens and save herself, warning her that Burke's rescue merely puts her after him on Death's list.

Kimberly sees omens of Tim's death but fails to save him from being crushed by a glass pane. Clear decides to leave the ward and introduces Kimberly and Burke to a mortician, William Bludworth, who tells them that only "new life" can defeat Death. Burke holds Isabella in custody under false charges to protect her, believing that the birth of her baby would create the loophole they need to ruin Death's design. He gathers the other survivors in his apartment for safety, but when Nora leaves, a chain reaction causes the doors of an elevator to decapitate her. Eugene attempts suicide with Burke's gun, but it repeatedly misfires; Clear rationalizes that it is not Eugene's turn to die.

The survivors ride in Kat's SUV after learning that Isabella was hospitalized to give birth. Along the way, the survivors reveal that the deaths of Flight 180 survivors inadvertently saved them from fatal incidents before Route 23's pile-up, creating ripple effects that Death resolves by reversing its list. The SUV suddenly blows a tire and crashes into a farm owned by the Gibbons family. Kat is pinned in her seat while the others escape. Rescue workers hospitalize Eugene, while one of them accidentally causes Kat to be impaled by a PVC pipe. Her death triggers a chain reaction that causes barbed wire to be launched in Rory's direction, fatally dismembering him.

Kimberly, Clear, and Burke rush to the hospital after Kimberly has a vision of a doctor named Kalarjian apparently killing Isabella. They see Isabella give birth to a baby boy and rejoice in the belief that their ordeal is over. However, Kimberly has another vision revealing that Isabella was never supposed to die on Route 23. Suddenly, an oxygen leak from Eugene's ward explodes and kills both him and Clear. Kimberly realizes that she must die clinically and be resuscitated, thus creating the loophole that defeats Death. She drives an ambulance into a lake and is revived by Dr. Kalarjian, saving both her and Burke.

Later, Kimberly and Burke picnic with the Gibbons and Kimberly's father. The Gibbons tell the story of Brian, their son, being saved from a speeding news van by Rory. As Kimberly and Burke realize the implications, Brian is killed when a malfunctioning propane grill explodes while he is grilling.

== Cast ==
- Ali Larter as Clear Rivers
- A. J. Cook as Kimberly Corman
- Michael Landes as Thomas Burke
- David Paetkau as Evan Lewis
- James Kirk as Tim Carpenter
- Lynda Boyd as Nora Carpenter
- Keegan Connor Tracy as Kat Jennings
- Jonathan Cherry as Rory Peters
- T. C. Carson as Eugene Dix
- Justina Machado as Isabella Hudson
- Tony Todd as William Bludworth
- Sarah Carter as Shaina
- Alex Rae as Dano
- Shaun Sipos as Frankie
- Andrew Airlie as Michael Corman
- Noel Fisher as Brian Gibbons
- Benita Ha as Jean
- Aaron Douglas as Deputy Steve Adams
- Eric Keenleyside as Detective Suby
- Enid-Raye Adams as Dr. Ellen Kalarjian
- Fred Henderson as Dr. Lees
- Alfred E. Humphreys as Mr. Gibbons
- Chilton Crane as Mrs. Gibbons

== Production ==
=== Development ===
Final Destination, the first film, was conceived by writers Jeffrey Reddick, James Wong, and Glen Morgan from Flight 180, a spec script intended for use in The X-Files. The film premiered across the United States and Canada on March 17, 2000, grossing $10,015,822 on its opening weekend and an overall gross of $112,880,294 internationally. The film's success inspired New Line Cinema then-President of Production Toby Emmerich to approach Reddick for a sequel, to which he responded positively. Reddick asserted that he "wanted to expand on the mythology and not just tell the same story over again". Wong and Morgan were not available for production since they had already signed on their respective projects The One and Willard. Instead, New Line hired second unit director and stunt coordinator David R. Ellis as director and writing partners Eric Bress and J. Mackye Gruber as co-writers.

"Second unit is like an extension of directing, you're doing big action sequences on film and it was just something I was going after. Once I got the offer from New Line and we got a good script, it was kind of a natural transition," Ellis professed. "I wanted our film to be able to stand alone but I watched Final Destination to see what they did that was so successful. I tried to use some of that while trying to keep a stand-alone feel for our movie. I kind of took what worked and tried to improve on it," Ellis added. "We wanted to take what the first film did effectively, and add levels and layers that would come out through the characters. When we first started writing this, we were trying to think, 'How can we make Death just a total badass?' and to be perfectly honest, the first crack we ever took at this script had to be reined in!" Bress uncovered. On the other hand, producers Craig Perry and Warren Zide from Zide/Perry Productions also returned and helped on financing the film, with Perry stating, "We could have made no other movies and the first one still would have been a satisfying experience. But when we were given the opportunity to make a sequel, we jumped at it."

=== Casting ===
The film's main cast: (from left to right) A. J. Cook as Kimberly Corman, James Kirk as Tim Carpenter, Lynda Boyd as Nora Carpenter, Michael Landes as Thomas Burke, Jonathan Cherry as Rory Peters, Terrence C. Carson as Eugene Dix, and Keegan Connor Tracy as Kat Jennings. Absent from the cast shot are Ali Larter as Clear Rivers and David Paetkau as Evan Lewis.

One of the prior film's main characters, Alex Browning (Devon Sawa), was killed off-screen in the film. Rumors indicated that Sawa had a contract dispute with New Line concerning the deduction of his salary; however, Perry resolved the issue with the statement that "it had everything to do with narrative, and nothing to do with money or Devon's unwillingness to come back". Reddick had originally planned to bring both Alex and Clear Rivers back, always intending to kill off Clear while keeping Alex alive due to coming up with a plot twist of Clear having a child with Alex that spared her life (much like in the original film's alternate ending) for a while until Death claimed her life, leaving Alex as the "torch-bearer" for the new protagonists, but scheduling conflicts with Sawa prevented them from bringing Alex back. If Reddick had known that he would be unable to use the Alex character, he would not have killed the Clear character, with the handling of Alex's absence being his only complaint about the sequel. Despite this, New Line arranged to have Ali Larter to reprise her character as Clear. "When New Line asked me to come back, I thought it was great. They showed me the script and let me have some input, and it was really terrific", Larter revealed. Larter indicated that Clear "[has] gotten to a hardened place and tucked herself inside because she has felt so much pain in her life. By having herself committed to a mental hospital, she has created a safehouse so that Death can't get her." Tony Todd also resumed his character as mortician William Bludworth. "It's the same character that we saw before that the audience loved", Ellis expressed.

The role of Kimberly Corman was given to Canadian actress A. J. Cook, who previously starred in the 1999 film The Virgin Suicides. Cook described her role as "a very strong girl, very determined because her mother died a year earlier, right in front of her eyes, so she had to grow up quick". Ellis described her role as "a girl who can have some fun cause they're going on a trip and they're gonna have a good time, yet someone who can stand up to Clear, to come and challenge Clear on a race, and to bother with Clear". Cook added that "it's so rare to find one strong female lead in a horror film, not to mention two [Larter]". Ellis and Perry were amazed by her sensitivity and vulnerability in her performance, and she was hired instantly. "[We] were at the beginning of what's going to be a long successful career for her", Perry cited.

Michael Landes, who appeared as Jimmy Olsen in the TV series Lois & Clark: The New Adventures of Superman, was cast as Thomas Burke. Landes defined him as "a real nice, decent guy who comes across this huge car accident [and] who is very intrigued to begin with" and as "the guy who bumps into the girl and he goes nuts as her protector". Ellis pointed out that he "just wanted to find someone who's young and who can relate to these kids. It wasn't an older guy, but still strong enough and yet sensitive. [Landes] brought this really good balance to his part." Landes was cast a day after his audition, which caused flight schedule problems on his departure two days after and cancellation of his appointments.

Former Living Single star Terrence C. Carson was hired as Eugene Dix. Carson identified his role as "a very by-the-book type of person but soon has a change of heart as the corpses begin to pile up". The crew was enticed of Carson's casting, with Bress mentioning how his "originally envisioned Woody Allen-type of character has got ten more times life than it ever had. It's got ten times the personality, this charisma that T.C. brings to it... he's just such a great presence." Similarly, Perry was astonished by how Carson "can take the most absurd lines and deliver them in such grammatized form with his eyes and his deep rich speaking voice". Jonathan Cherry, who recently emerged in the 2003 film House of the Dead, was appointed as Rory Peters. Cherry characterized Rory as "a very opposite of me whose arc goes from, 'I don't really care at all', to 'Oh my God, this is really happening!'"

In the script, Bress said that Rory was his favorite character to write since "he's great comic relief, he's got a drug problem, he's funny, and he's all that". Bress bragged that "Cherry is awesome, awesome casting cause he's just so funny and the way he delivers his lines. It's like 'Oh yeah. That's good! That's better!'" "What I think was surprising on him was that from all of the humor he's involved and his sort of itchiness that he has with Kat, there is some moments where he reveals how vulnerable he really is and so the shield comes down and right in there you're really becoming sympathetic to Rory. You like him at first cause he's the funny guy, but then you care about him because you realize that there's a place that humor comes from that we all share", Perry appended.

Blackwoods actress Keegan Connor Tracy played Kat Jennings. Tracy claimed that "[Kat] doesn't really buy it at first, but pretty soon even her cynical attitude can't ignore the truth of the situation they're all in." Perry defined the role as "someone who is really so self-absorbed that without being overly malicious is incredibly rude and insensitive to the feelings of all those around her". Her casting was assessed by Perry as "full of energy" and "embodies the self-aware nervous energy of Kat. [Tracy] created a character that you kind of dislike intensely but you don't dislike so much that you don't understand why she is the way she is." Rounding up the cast are Lynda Boyd (Rachel Todd in You, Me and the Kids) as widow Nora Carpenter and James Kirk (Kyle Morgan in Once Upon a Christmas) as her son Tim Carpenter, David Paetkau (Hunter Kerrigan in Just Deal) as gambler Evan Lewis, Justina Machado (Vanessa Diaz in Six Feet Under) as pregnant Isabella Hudson, and Noel Fisher (Todd Tolanski of X-Men: Evolution) as farmer Brian Gibbons. Novice actors Sarah Carter, Alejandro Rae, and Shaun Sipos were hired as Kimberly's friends Shaina, Dano, and Frankie correspondingly. Andrew Airlie portrayed Kimberly's father Michael Corman, while Enid-Raye Adams appeared as Dr. Ellen Kalarjian.

Mary Elizabeth Winstead auditioned for a role in the film because she was a fan of the first film but was not cast. She would later be cast as Wendy Christensen in Final Destination 3.

=== Filming ===
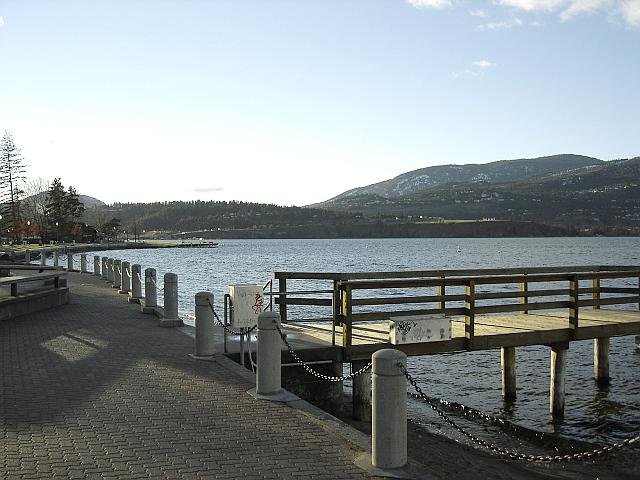
Okanagan Lake replaced Greenwood Lake, New York, in the film for the lake sequence. The scene was shot in two different locations, the other in a private pool in Campbell River, British Columbia.

Like the first film, the film was shot in and around Vancouver Island in 2002. "We know the area, we know the people up there and let's be honest, there's an enormous economic incentive to shoot there. We were very fortunate to get [unit production manager] Justis Greene, who's been working as a line producer up there for 30 years and who was able to get us the best crew working in town right now. It was advantageous to us on so many levels, that it was just the right place to go for this movie," Perry stated as the reason for the film's production in British Columbia. British Columbia Highway 19 was utilized as Route 23. The Plaza of Nations was used as a stand-in for Ellis Medical Complex, the site of Tim's death.

The farm and lake scenes were filmed in Campbell River and Okanagan Lake respectively, though it is depicted in Greenwood Lake, New York. "We shot part of it at the lake where it was 37° cold, which is beyond an ice cream headache. And the second stuff we shot in a big huge tank where we filmed all the underwater sequence, that was in a 93° pool," Landes clarified. Cook and Landes performed their own stunts in both sequences. "My biggest fear is being trapped in a car underwater. So it was kind of cool to face my fear and all that," Cook divulged. "We took a couple of lessons with a scuba guide to be comfortable being underwater and breathing off the regulator," Landes enunciated.

To avoid confusion with Larter and Carter, Cook was required to dye her hair brown for the role. "I like being a chameleon. It opens you up for so much more in this work. You don't get typecast", Cook professed. Landes also denied plots regarding Thomas and Kimberly's relationship. "It's kind of a protected relationship, more like a brother/sister thing than a love interest. They didn't want to go there, I guess. They did go that way in an earlier draft of the script but they didn't want it to seem like the cop is like lascivious or something. So what they have now, hopefully, is a little bit of chemistry and you get the idea that through tragedy something good will come. So it ends in an optimistic way, that maybe they can be together but there's no real love story", Landes articulated.

=== Effects ===
A montage of the process in rendering the death scene of Rory (Cherry). In the first image, a wide-angle view of Campbell River is shot for background use in the final result. In the second image, a lifecast of Cherry is positioned against a green screen and severed in pieces. In the third image, the first and second image are composited to be presented among the continuity of the film.

Digital Dimension took charge of the visual effects of the film. CG supervisor Jason Crosby pointed out that their studio was mainly selected for the highway sequence after the crew realized real logs only bounced about an inch off the road when dropped from a logging truck. "They were concerned about how they would make the shot happen, not knowing if CG would work. The timing was great because we had just finished a test shot of our CG logs bouncing on the freeway. We sent a tape to Vancouver and after seeing it the crew was convinced that any of the log shots could be done with CG," Crosby indicated. "It began with R&D on the log dynamics. Scripts were written to help manage the dynamic simulations with real world numbers for gravity, density, etc. The results were remarkably similar to the original logs shot in Vancouver, a testament to the accuracy of the software and the data we had collected, however the logs still lacked the 'jumping through windshields killer instinct' we were looking for. By tweaking the parameters, we coaxed the logs into a much livelier role."

Senior technical director James Coulter added creative 3D tracking on shots with fast pans, motion blur, and filters such as dust, mist, slabs of bark, broken chains, and other debris. Digital artist Edmund Kozin manipulated high-resolution photos which were carefully stitched together to achieve realistic texture amongst the 22 CG logs of the film. Hair shaders were also used for splintering and frayed wood looks for the logs. Physics such as speed and height of the logging truck, length and width of the logs, type of wood and density of a Douglas-fir were also considered.

In spite of this, there are no CG cars incorporated in the actual film. "It was a possibility in the beginning so we did some dynamics tests using the logs as rigid bodies to hit cars with soft body deformers on them, but when they were done shooting they didn't end up needing any CG cars," Crosby avowed. Lifecasts of the actors were also used for all of the death scenes, including the highway setting. Landes experienced claustrophobia during the procedure. Fake blood was also used, but CG blood was also shown.

=== Music ===
==== Soundtrack ====
Like its predecessor, no official album accompanied the motion picture; however, there are ten songs featured in the film itself and two music videos embedded in its subsequent home release. Two singles of the Sounds, "Dance with Me" and "Rock 'n Roll", were promoted on Kimberly's car stereo. Besides these, the music video of "Seven Days a Week" accompanied the film's DVD. "Middle of Nowhere" by the Blank Theory was both heard on Evan's car radio and inserted in the DVD along with its music video. "Rocky Mountain High" by John Denver was covered twice in the end credits by Pete Snell and Jude Christodal. Christodal also performed "My Name is Death" during Brian's death and the end credits. Other songs integrated were "Highway to Hell" by AC/DC (on Kimberly's car AV), "Jon F. Hennessy" by FT (on Rory's vehicle audio), "Vitamin" by Incubus (during Evan's house fire) and "I Got You" by (hed) Planet Earth (during Rory's party).

==== Score ====
Final Destination 2: Original Motion Picture Score

Film score by Shirley Walker
- Released: September 30, 2003
- Genre: Film score
- Length: 31:08
- Label: Warner Bros. Records

Shirley Walker soundtrack chronology
Final Destination: The Complete Original Motion Picture Score (2000)	Final Destination 2: Original Motion Picture Score (2003)	Willard: The Original Motion Picture Score (2003)

Final Destination 2: Original Motion Picture Score was the promotional film score conducted by Shirley Walker. Though it was not officially released, it was made available alongside Willard: The Original Motion Picture Score on September 30, 2003.

The score received positive reviews among commentators. Robert Koehler of Variety applauded that "Shirley Walker's score displays a thorough understanding of horror jolts." Pete Roberts of DVDActive admired the score as "top notch". Anthony Horan of DVD.net Australia told readers to "crank up the volume and prepare for a sonic feast". Nonetheless, Chris Carle of IGN Movies noted that "while the score is nothing you'll remember, it gets the job done".

== Release ==
=== Box office ===
The film premiered in 2,834 theaters across the United States and Canada on January 31, 2003, earning $16,017,141 in its opening weekend with an average of $5,651 per theater. Final Destination 2 placed at #2 in the United States box office in its opening weekend, only $200,000 short behind the thriller film The Recruit, which debuted on the same day, starred Al Pacino and Colin Farrell, and cleared $16,302,063 domestically. The film dropped to #5 in the next weekend and descended to #7 in its third weekend during Washington's Birthday. The film dropped out of the top-ten list in its fourth weekend until its last screening in 42 theaters in its sixteenth weekend, grossing $27,585 and placing in #65. Final Destination 2 grossed $46,961,214 in the United States and Canada on its total screening and produced $43,465,191 in other territories, having an overall gross of $90.9 million internationally.

In comparison with its precursor, Final Destination ranked #3 on its opening weekend with net worth of $10,015,822, which is $6 million less than the first weekend of Final Destination 2 at #2. The previous film received $53,302,314 domestically throughout its 22-week run, $6.4 million more than its sequel's gross all through its 16-week presentation. Final Destination amassed $59,549,147 in other countries and $112,802,314 overall, getting $16 million and $22 million more than Final Destination 2 in that order.

=== Home media ===
The film was released on VHS and DVD on July 22, 2003, as part of New Line's Infinifilm series. The DVD includes bonus features including an audio commentary, six deleted scenes, three documentaries, two music videos, three trailers, interactive menus and subtitles. The audio commentary presents Ellis, Perry, Bress, and Gruber providing information about the making of the film and their intentions overall. Deleted scenes are a cross-examination with Isabella's husband Marcus Hudson (Roger Cross), a conversation between Eugene and Nora, a car chase concerning Kimberly's reckless driving, and Eugene's meeting with Death at the hospital, and extended versions of Kimberly's interrogation at the police station and the encounter with Bludworth. The first documentary labelled Bits & Pieces: Bringing Life To Death runs for 30 minutes and recalls the history of splatter film, on top of accounts in relation to the visual effects of the film. The second documentary entitled Cheating Death: Beyond and Back progresses for 18 minutes and brings out people recounting their own real-life experiences with death. The Terror Gauge, the third documentary, is a test screening system of the film in which viewers are subjected to biofeedback and neurological examination under neurophysiologist Dr. Victoria Ibric. Other featurettes of the DVD include the interactive game Choose Your Fate, the music videos of Middle of Nowhere by the Blank Theory and Seven Days a Week by the Sounds, the theatrical trailers of this film and its antecedent, in addition to informative trivia provided throughout the featurettes.

A Blu-ray edition was released on August 30, 2011.

== Reception ==
=== Critical response ===
The fictional pile-up along Route 23 was called the "greatest car crash scene in movie history" and was nominated with a MTV Movie Award for Best Action Sequence in 2003.

Review aggregator website Rotten Tomatoes reports that 52% of 114 critics gave the film positive reviews, with an average rating of 5 out of 10. The site's critics consensus reads: "This sequel is little more than an excuse to stage elaborate, gory scenes of characters getting killed off." On Metacritic, it has a weighted average score of 38 out of 100 based on 25 critics, indicating "generally unfavorable" reviews. In 2010, Nick Hyman of Metacritic included Final Destination 2 in the website's editorial 15 Movies the Critics Got Wrong, denoting that "the elaborate suspense/action set pieces from the first two films are more impressive than most". Audiences polled by CinemaScore gave the film an average grade of B+ on an A+ to F scale.

Negative evaluations condemned the film's plot, acting, and screenplay. Roger Ebert of Chicago Sun-Times wrote that "perhaps movies are like history, and repeat themselves, first as tragedy, then as farce". James Berardinelli of ReelViews stressed that "the movie mandates complete gullibility and vacuous attention in order to work on any level". Claudia Puig of USA Today complained that "there is an audience for a movie in which innocent people suffer hideous accidental deaths is troubling enough, but a group of creative people chose to direct their energies on this repulsive spectacle [which] simply provokes disgust". Justine Elias of The Village Voice asserted that "this risible thriller is merely a sadistic series of misread premonitions and vile murders". David Grove of Film Threat stated that "[he] wasn't much scared by anything in Final Destination 2 which is silly and illogical". Jeff Vice of Deseret News censured to "not even get into the awful script or the numbingly awful performances", while Bruce Fretts of Entertainment Weekly stated "everything else about the film is also deadly".

Some critics praised the film's comedic theme. A. O. Scott of The New York Times imparted "it's not as cheekily knowing as the Scream movies or as trashily Grand Guignol as the Evil Dead franchise, but like those pictures it recognizes the close relationship between fright and laughter, and dispenses both with a free, unpretentious hand". C. W. Nevius of San Francisco Chronicle conveyed its "funnier than the original". Maitland McDonagh of TV Guide pronounced "if this is your idea of fun, step right up". William Arnold of Seattle Post-Intelligencer found it as "a series of Grand Guignol skits played for mean-spirited laughs". Marc Savlov of Austin Chronicle admired how "it is surprisingly good fun for the current crop of horror films, reasonably well-plotted and full of jaw-dropping, white-knuckle scares. That said, it's most definitely not for the squeamish nor the easily offended." Nev Pierce of BBC saw that "it's simple, but effective", whereas Sheila Norman-Culp of The Atlanta Journal-Constitution proclaimed that "what Final Destination did for the fear of flying, Final Destination 2 does for the fear of driving".

Amongst the cast ensemble, Carson, Cherry, Cook, Landes, Larter, and Todd were prominent amidst the analysis for their performances as Eugene, Rory, Kimberly, Thomas, Clear, and Bludworth respectively. Koehler of Variety said that "Carson as skeptical Eugene energizes what had been a rote conception on the page"; "Cherry offered some dry comic balance"; Larter was "casted little light"; Todd was squandered by his "single, distinctly flat scene"; and "the generally awful thesping, led by Cook, whose blurry grasp of emotions betrays Ellis' apparent disinterest in his actors". Grove of Film Threat panned Cook, uttering that "she's no great actress, but she's a real looker" and teased that "since when did a horror movie suffer from having two dumb blondes as leads", the other actress being Larter, who "spends the whole movie looking miserable with her frigid acting". Dustin Putman of TheMovieBoy.com commented how "Cook is serviceable as the premonition-fueled Kimberly, but doesn't evoke enough emotion in the scenes following the brutal deaths of her close friends." Robin Clifford of Reeling Reviews stated that "Cook was strident as the catalyst that sparks events with her premonitions of disaster and her fervent desire to cheat the Reaper" whereas Larter was "giving the smart-ass edge her character needs", while Brett Gallman of Oh, The Horror! claimed that Larter "is again the bright spot", along with Cook and Landes who were "serviceable as leads" and Todd "whose purpose has still yet to be revealed in the franchise".

In January 2022, Stephen Rosenberg of MovieWeb ranked the franchise's films from worst to best. Rosenberg highlighted Final Destination 2 as the best installment of the franchise, citing the opening sequence as, "memorable in the entire horror genre, let alone the franchise" and praised Todd's performance.

=== Accolades ===
Like its predecessor, the film was nominated for the Saturn Award for Best Horror Film in 2004, as well as Choice Movie - Horror/Thriller in the 2003 Teen Choice Awards; likewise, the awards lost to 28 Days Later and The Ring, respectively. In the 4th Golden Trailer Awards, it was voted for the Golden Fleece, but lost to the surfer film Blue Crush. Furthermore, the Collision on Highway 23 was nominated for Best Action Sequence at the MTV Movie Awards in 2003, but lost it to the Battle for Helm's Deep of the fantasy film The Lord of the Rings: The Two Towers, another New Line film.

The highway scene was regarded by Grove of Film Threat as "a monument to smashed cars, flying objects and scorched metal" and Garth Franklin of Dark Horizons as "utterly spectacular." Anne Billson of Guardian.co.uk exclaimed it as "one of the most terrifying sequences I've ever seen, all the more effective for being grounded in reality; few drivers haven't felt that anxious twinge as the badly secured load on the lorry in front of them starts to wobble."

The Route 23 pile-up scene was number 1 in the lists of best car crashes or disaster scenes by Screen Junkies, Made Man, Unreality Magazine, All Left Turns, Chillopedia, Filmstalker, io9, UGO Entertainment, Filmcritic.com, and New York Magazine. Filmsite enlisted all fatalities in its Best Film Deaths Scenes. The demise of Kirk's character entered these listings of the most shocking deaths on film: George Wales of Total Film (#28), James Eldred of Bullz-Eye.com (#20), and Jeff Otto of Bloody Disgusting (#9).
