= Chris Bender (film producer) =

American film producer

- Born: 1971 (age 54–55); New Jersey, United States
- Occupation: Film Producer

Chris Bender (born 1971) is an American film producer whose beginnings were through developing and co-producing the American Pie film series based on his and writer Adam Herz' own high school experiences. In November 1998, he established the management and production company Benderspink with partner J.C. Spink, a fellow alumnus of Bucknell University. Benderspink had a successful first look deal with New Line Cinema for over 15 years and a first look deal with Universal Cable Productions and before that, CBS Studios and Fox 21.

In 2016, Bender and Spink split up to pursue forming their own companies. J.C. Spink died in 2017 and was celebrated at a memorial service attended by industry friends and family.

Chris Bender founded Good Fear Content in 2016 with Jake Weiner. The company produces clutter-busting media across theatrical, TV and emerging digital platforms with a focus on nurturing and establishing new voices aspiring to be generation-defining talent. Under the company’s banner, Bender’s most recent release was as producer on David Robert Mitchell’s Under the Silver Lake with Oscar nominee Andrew Garfield, Riley Keough, and Topher Grace. The film was screened in competition in Cannes and was released by A24 domestically in April 2019. In 2020, Amazon Studios released My Spy. The film is directed by Pete Segal with Dave Bautista and Kristen Schaal starring. That project was followed by Mulan, a live action version of the classic adventure of a young Chinese maiden who disguises herself as a warrior in order to save her father. Released by Disney, the film is directed by Niki Caro and stars Yifei Liu, Jet Li, Gong Li, and Donnie Yen.

Other projects produced by Bender include the hit comedy We're the Millers, starring Jennifer Aniston and Jason Sudeikis; Horrible Bosses 2, starring Jason Bateman, Jason Sudeikis, and Charlie Day; and Vacation, starring Ed Helms, Christina Applegate, and Chris Hemsworth, all for New Line.

Bender has produced or developed projects that have grown into six franchises in various genres: Final Destination, American Pie, The Ring, Cats & Dogs, The Butterfly Effect, and The Hangover series. Eight of his movies have opened to number one, and Bender was nominated for a Golden Globe Award for A History of Violence.

== Filmography ==
Producer

- American Pie (1999) (Co-producer)
- Final Destination (2000) (Associate producer)
- American Pie 2 (2001) (Co-producer)
- The Butterfly Effect (2004)
- Monster-in-Law (2005)
- A History of Violence (2005)
- Red Eye (2005)
- Just Friends (2005)
- The Butterfly Effect 2 (2006) (Direct to video)
- The Ruins (2008)
- Leap Year (2010)
- Arthur (2011)
- The Incredible Burt Wonderstone (2013)
- We're the Millers (2013)
- Zombeavers (2014) (Direct to video)
- Vacation (2015)
- Criminal (2016)
- Under the Silver Lake (2018)
- Polaroid (2019)
- My Spy (2020)
- Mulan (2020)
- The Parenting (2025)
- The Calling (TBA)

Executive producer

- Cats & Dogs (2001)
- Cheats (2002)
- American Wedding (2003)
- Blind Horizon (2003) (Co-executive producer)
- The Ring Two (2005) (Co-executive producer)
- Kyle XY (2006–09)
- The Hangover (2009)
- I Am Number Four (2011)
- The Hangover Part II (2011)
- The Hangover Part III (2013)
- Tracktown (2016)
- Rings (2017)
- Hysteria! (2024)
