= J. C. Spink =

American film producer (1972–2017)

- Born: Jeffrey Christian Spink; February 25, 1972; Philadelphia, Pennsylvania, U.S.
- Died: April 18, 2017 (aged 45); West Hollywood, California, U.S.
- Education: William Penn Charter School
- Alma mater: Bucknell University
- Occupations: Talent manager, film producer

Jeffrey Christian Spink (February 25, 1972 – April 18, 2017) was an American talent manager and film producer.

== Early life ==
J. C. Spink was born in Philadelphia and graduated from Bucknell University.

== Career ==
Spink established Benderspink, a management-production company with partner Chris Bender in 1998 with American Pie in post-production and fourteen writer clients. Benderspink's film production arm had a deal with New Line Cinema for over two decades. Spink produced or executive produced a wide variety of projects, including Cats & Dogs, The Ring franchise, The Butterfly Effect, Kyle XY (for television), Leap Year and A History of Violence, for which he and Bender received a Golden Globe Award nomination. Benderspink continued to make diverse feature films over the past fifteen years including the romantic comedies Just Friends, starring Ryan Reynolds, Monster-in-Law, starring Jennifer Lopez and Jane Fonda, and Red Eye, directed by Wes Craven and starring Rachel McAdams.

Spink served as an executive producer on the worldwide blockbuster comedies The Hangover and We're the Millers. Other notable credits include Ride Along and Criminal.

A young J. C. Spink (played by actors Cooper Roth and Zayne Emory) was a recurring minor character in the first two seasons of the ABC comedy The Goldbergs. In addition, the real J. C. Spink had made cameos in two episodes as a bus driver. Spink was a real-life schoolmate of series creator Adam F. Goldberg. According to The Goldbergs, J. C. bullied Adam till he saw the error of his ways.

== Death ==
Spink died on April 18, 2017, in West Hollywood, California. On July 12 the same year, the Los Angeles County coroner's office ruled that his death was complications from an accidental undiagnosed drug overdose.

== Filmography ==
Year	Title	Role	Notes
2001	Cats & Dogs	Executive producer	
2002	Cheats	Producer	
2003	Blind Horizon	Co-executive producer	
2004	The Butterfly Effect	Producer	
2005	The Ring Two	Co-executive producer	
2005	Monster-in-Law	Producer	
2005	A History of Violence	Producer	
2005	Red Eye	Executive producer	
2005	Just Friends	Producer	
2006-09	Kyle XY	Executive producer	TV series
2009	The Hangover	Executive producer	
2010	Leap Year	Executive producer	
2011	I Am Number Four	Executive producer	
2011	Arthur	Executive producer	
2011	The Hangover II	Executive producer	
2013	The Incredible Burt Wonderstone	Executive producer	
2013	The Hangover III	Executive producer	
2013	We're the Millers	Executive producer	
2014	Zombeavers	Producer	
2014-15	The Goldbergs	Joe the Bus Driver	TV series, 2 episodes
2016	Criminal	Producer	
