= Noe Valley public toilet =

Public toilet in San Francisco, US

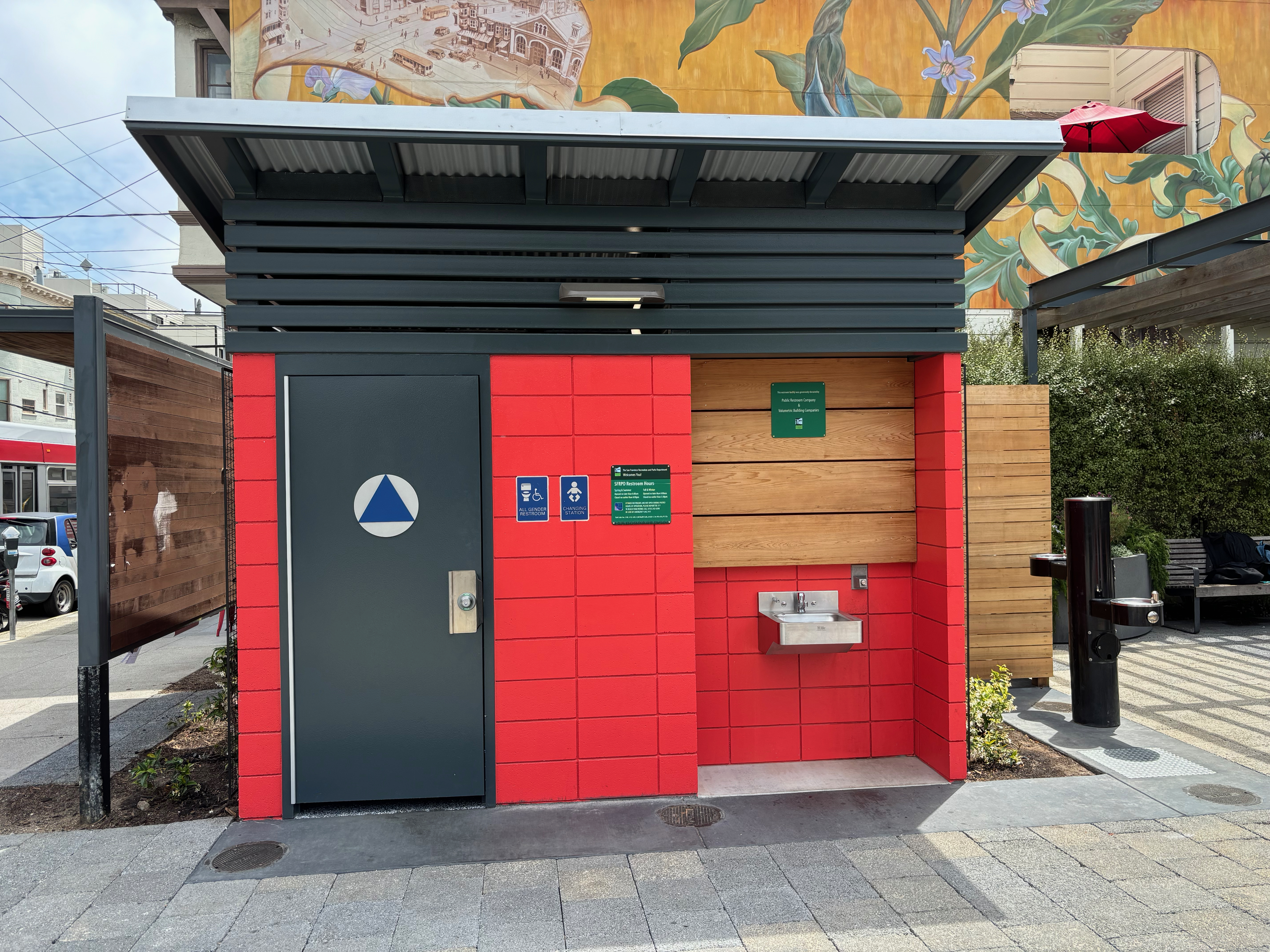
- The toilet in June 2024
- Interactive map of the Noe Valley public toilet area

General information
- Architectural style: Prefabricated
- Location: 3861 24th St, San Francisco, California
- Coordinates: 37.75145°N 122.42887°W
- Construction started: February, 2024
- Opened: April 22, 2024
- Cost: $200,000 scaled back from $1,700,000
- Owner: San Francisco Recreation & Parks Department

Technical details
- Material: Steel
- Size: 10 by 5 feet (3.0 m × 1.5 m)

Design and construction
- Architect: Volumetric Building Companies

The Noe Valley public toilet is a public toilet in the San Francisco neighborhood Noe Valley. The toilet's original proposed cost of $1.7 million inspired media coverage and criticism of the San Francisco government. In the wake of the media coverage, the San Francisco Recreation & Parks Department, its owner, called it "the world's most famous and eagerly anticipated prefab toilet".

The original proposal for the toilet was planned to occupy approximately 150 square feet and to be funded by the State of California to address open defecation in the city. The responsible government agency, San Francisco Recreation & Parks Department, held a press conference in October 2020 in which the department projected its construction to cost $1.7 million. San Francisco Chronicle columnist Heather Knight reported on the cost and time to build the toilet, sparking public outcry. A celebration the city government had planned for the toilet was canceled due to public dissatisfaction with the price and the two year construction timeline. California State Assembly member Matt Haney, representing part of San Francisco, was one of the critics, and stated it showed the city had a "dysfunctional bureaucracy". Haney had secured the $1.7 million.

The cost and time needed to construct the toilet was attributed to higher costs of materials in the area, the hiring of an architect, the solicitation of community feedback, and requirements for multiple reviews by commissions, such as the Civic Design Review Committee's determination of whether the project was "appropriate to its context in the urban environment", along with the corresponding need to pay for staff time.

In January 2023, city officials announced they were accepting a donated modular bathroom from Public Restroom Company in Nevada. The new estimate with installation, electrical work, landscaping, and other costs came to $725,000. Volumetric Building Companies offered to cover costs on engineering and architecture work, and both companies would pay for unionized labor to install the toilet. The donated toilet was required to clear permitting and coordination with the Pacific Gas and Electric Company, San Francisco Department of Public Works, Public Utilities Commission, Planning Department, Department of Building Inspection, Mayor's Office on Disability, and Arts Commission.

Site preparation began in February, 2024; the prefabricated restroom was placed by a crane in March; and installation was completed on April 22, 2024, costing about $200,000 to the city. Most of the costs came from labor. The 50 square foot facility contains a metal toilet and a baby changing station. A celebration was held at the toilet to commemorate its opening, with city residents hosting a party called the "Toilet Bowl".

== See also ==
- Portland Loo
