= Kyle XY =

2006 American science fiction series

- Genre: Science fiction; Teen drama
- Created by: Eric Bress; J. Mackye Gruber
- Starring: Matt Dallas; Marguerite MacIntyre; Bruce Thomas; April Matson; Jean-Luc Bilodeau; Kirsten Prout; Chris Olivero; Jaimie Alexander
- Narrated by: Matt Dallas
- Music by: Michael Suby
- Country of origin: United States
- Original language: English
- No. of seasons: 3
- No. of episodes: 43 (list of episodes)

Production
- Executive producers: Eric Tuchman; David Himelfarb; J. Mackye Gruber; Chris Bender; J.C. Spink; Richard Heus; Eric Bress; Tommy Thompson
- Producers: Julie Plec; Charlie Gogolak; Curtis Kheel; Richard Heus; Chad Fiveash; S. Lily Hui; James Patrick Stoteraux; Matt Dallas
- Running time: 44 minutes
- Production companies: Two Cigarettes and One Match Productions (season 1); Kyle XY Productions; BenderSpink Productions; ABC Studios (Note: Known as Touchstone Television for the first season) ABC Family

Original release
- Network: ABC Family
- Release: June 26, 2006 – March 16, 2009

Kyle XY is an American science fiction television series created by Eric Bress and J. Mackye Gruber and produced by ABC Studios. The central character is a teenage boy (Matt Dallas) who awakens naked in a forest outside Seattle, Washington, with amnesia and no belly button. He is taken in by a family and given the name Kyle. The series follows Kyle as he tries to solve the puzzles of who he is and why he has no memory before that day. Although set in Seattle, the series was filmed in the Vancouver, British Columbia area.

The series premiered June 26, 2006, on the ABC Family cable channel. The series ran for three seasons, ending on March 16, 2009. The final episode featured several cliffhangers, which were eventually resolved in a special feature on the third season DVD.

== Cast and characters ==
Kyle and the Trager family. Left to right: Stephen, Lori, Kyle, Josh, and Nicole.

=== Main ===
- Matt Dallas as Kyle Trager
- Marguerite MacIntyre as Nicole Trager
- Bruce Thomas as Stephen Trager
- April Matson as Lori Trager
- Jean-Luc Bilodeau as Josh Trager
- Chris Olivero as Declan McDonough
- Kirsten Prout as Amanda Bloom
- Jaimie Alexander as Jessi Hollander (seasons 2–3)

=== Recurring ===
- Chelan Simmons as Hillary
- Nicholas Lea as Tom Foss
- Teryl Rothery as Carol Bloom
- Cory Monteith as Charlie Tanner (seasons 1–2)
- J. Eddie Peck as Adam Baylin (seasons 1–2)
- Sarah-Jane Redmond as Rebecca Thatcher (seasons 1–2)
- Andrew Jackson as Cyrus Reynolds (seasons 1–2)
- Bill Dow as Professor William Kern (seasons 1–2)
- Kurt Max Runte as Detective Jason Breen (season 1)
- Magda Apanowicz as Andy Jensen (seasons 2–3)
- Martin Cummins as Brian Taylor (season 2)
- Ally Sheedy as Sarah Emerson (seasons 2–3)
- Leah Cairns as Emily Hollander (season 2)
- Conrad Coates as Julian Ballantine (season 2)
- Josh Zuckerman as Mark (seasons 2–3)
- Jesse Hutch as Nate Harrison (season 3)
- Hal Ozsan as Michael Cassidy (season 3)

== Episodes ==
Season	Episodes	Originally released	
Season	Episodes	First released	Last released
1	10	June 26, 2006	August 28, 2006
2	23	June 11, 2007	March 17, 2008
3	10	January 12, 2009	March 16, 2009

== Home media ==
Season	DVD title	Set details	DVD release dates			Special features
Season	DVD title	Set details	Region 1	Region 2	Region 4	Special features
1	Kyle XY: The Complete First Season – Declassified	Discs: 3; Episodes: 10	May 22, 2007	August 4, 2008	December 3, 2008	Alternate Premiere; Extended Season Finale; Kyle XY Declassified – "Kyle File"; Audio Commentaries
2	Kyle XY: The Complete Second Season – Revelations	Discs: 6; Episodes: 23	December 30, 2008	N/A	N/A	Alternate Ending; Deleted Scenes; Livin' with the X's; Audio Commentaries; The Science of Kyle XY
2	Kyle XY: The Complete Second Season – Revelations	Discs: 4; Episodes: 13 (Note: Comprises the first thirteen episodes of season two)	N/A	N/A	March 11, 2009	Alternate Ending; Deleted Scenes; Livin' with the X's; Facing the Future; Audio Commentaries
3	Kyle XY: The Complete Third Season – Full Disclosure	Discs: 3; Episodes: 10 (Note: Comprises the remaining ten episodes of season two)	N/A	N/A	November 4, 2009	Audio Commentaries; Deleted Scenes; The Science of Kyle XY
3	Kyle XY: The Complete Third and Final Season	Discs: 3; Episodes: 10	December 22, 2009	N/A	N/A	Kyle XY: Future Revealed; Deleted Scenes; Audio Commentaries

== Reception ==
=== Ratings ===
Kyle XY was ABC Family channel's highest-rated original series from June 2006 to July 2008; this position was eclipsed by the series premiere of The Secret Life of the American Teenager, which brought in 2.8 million viewers. The third-season premiere was 1.5 million total viewers, down 33 percent from the second-season opener, and most ABC Family shows significantly outperformed the show. The second episode slid to 1.426 million viewers.

=== Accolades ===
Year	Award	Category	Nominee(s)	Result	Ref.
2006	Teen Choice Awards	Choice Summer Series	Kyle XY	Nominated	
2007	Teen Choice Awards	Choice TV Show: Drama	Kyle XY	Nominated	
2007	Teen Choice Awards	Choice TV: Breakout	Matt Dallas	Nominated	
2007	TCA Awards	Outstanding Achievement in Children's Programming	Kyle XY	Won	
2007	Artios Award	Best Children's TV Programming	Robert J. Ulrich, Eric Dawson, Carol Kritzer, Wendy O'Brien, Coreen Mayrs and Heike Brandstatter (Canadian casting)	Nominated	
2007	Saturn Awards	Best Actor in a Television Program	Matt Dallas	Nominated	
2007	Saturn Awards	Best Syndicated/Cable Television Series	Kyle XY	Nominated	
2008	Saturn Awards	Best Actor on Television	Matt Dallas	Nominated	
2008	Saturn Awards	Best Supporting Actress on Television	Jaimie Alexander	Nominated	
2008	Saturn Awards	Best Syndicated/Cable Television Series	Kyle XY	Nominated	
2008	GLAAD Media Award	Individual Episode (in a Series without a Regular LGBT Character)	"Free To Be You and Me"	Nominated	

== In other media ==
=== Novels ===
Two novels based on the series have been published, both written by S. G. Wilkins. The first, Kyle XY: Nowhere to Hide, concerns Kyle's first Halloween, while the second, Kyle XY: Under the Radar, concerns the school's election for student president, with Kyle as a candidate.

=== Soundtrack and music ===
The music supervisor for the show was Chris Mollere. Michael Suby wrote the opening theme, and most of the score and cues; none of his work appeared on the soundtrack album, which was released in 2007.

=== Alternate reality game ===
Kyle XY featured an online alternate reality game during the first season in which players were "invited" to help solve the mystery of Kyle's actual identity. ABC Family and Touchstone hosted a website by the fictional business The Mada Corporation that served as the game's rabbit hole introducing players to the in-game universe, but the project ended during the second season.

== See also ==
- Benjaman Kyle
