= The Butterfly Effect 2 =

2006 film

- Promotional film poster
- Directed by: John R. Leonetti
- Written by: Michael D. Weiss
- Produced by: Anthony Rhulen; Chris Bender; J. C. Spink; A. J. Dix
- Starring: Eric Lively; Erica Durance; Dustin Milligan; Gina Holden
- Cinematography: Brian Pearson
- Edited by: Jacqueline Cambas
- Music by: Michael Suby
- Distributed by: New Line Cinema
- Release date: October 10, 2006
- Running time: 92 minutes
- Country: United States
- Language: English
- Box office: $966,458

The Butterfly Effect 2 is a 2006 American science fiction psychological thriller film directed by John R. Leonetti and starring Eric Lively, Erica Durance, Dustin Milligan and Gina Holden. The film is largely unrelated to the 2004 film The Butterfly Effect and was released direct-to-video on October 10, 2006. It is followed by The Butterfly Effect 3: Revelations (2009).

The film grossed $966,458 in box office and $2.9 million in home video sales. The film received generally negative reviews, with reviewers criticizing its formulaic copy of the first film, simply with different characters.

== Plot ==
Nick and his girlfriend, Julie, are celebrating Julie's 24th birthday with their friends Trevor and Amanda. Nick and Julie begin discussing their future when Nick is urgently called in to work. He has to go to the meeting because he is up against co-worker Dave Bristol for a promotion. As the four friends drive back to the city, their vehicle collides with a semi-truck. Of the four friends, only Nick survives. Later, when he is looking at a photograph of himself and Julie, everything in the room begins to shudder and shake, while the people in the photograph begin moving.

One year later, while presenting an important sales pitch to investors, Nick suffers a blinding headache and an outrageous nosebleed. As a result, he is given a week's suspension. Back home, Nick looks through photographs from Julie's birthday and somehow finds himself transported to the moment just before the fatal collision. This time, he knows how to avoid the accident, and he awakens in a new timeline where Julie is living happily with him. However, in this reality, Nick's life is ruined when he is fired for backing up his friend and colleague, Trevor.

Later, Nick sees a Christmas photograph of him, his friends, and colleagues, and realizes it was taken when a crucial deal was made, resulting in Dave's promotion. Nick decides to try to alter this in his favor, so he focuses on the photo to trigger another episode. Sure enough, he finds himself back at the party.

After deliberately spilling a drink on Dave to distract him, he finds the paperwork for the crucial deal. Nick then returns to the present in a new version of reality. In this reality, Nick is the vice-president of the company, but he and Julie have split up, and he is living the bachelor lifestyle. Also, Trevor and Nick end up on the wrong side of a shady investor; the company is in ruins after failed deals, and the investor, infuriated by the lack of results, kills Trevor, who had borrowed money from him. In the course of trying to escape a similar fate, Nick runs into Julie just as one of the investor's armed henchmen tries to shoot him, but shoots her instead. Nick is rendered unconscious before he can go back in time once again. He awakes in the bedroom of the investor's sadistic business partner and accidentally kills him while struggling to escape. Nick confesses everything to his mother, who tells him that he cannot "control everything". She says his father also tried to control things (implying in the process that his father had the same ability as Nick), but ultimately committed suicide.

Nick travels to the scene at the start of the movie, hoping to finally fix everything by breaking up with Julie. He did not anticipate how upset she would be, nor that she would confess to being pregnant and speed away in his car. Fearing a repeat of the original accident, Nick speeds after her, but, while avoiding an oncoming car, he opts to save Julie rather than himself by driving off the road and over a cliff.

One year later, Julie lives in NYC with her son, Nick Jr., who seems to have the same affliction as his father.

In a series of flickering flashbacks that run during the end credits, an unidentified man (who is presumably Nick's own father) is shown grappling with mental illness – presumably brought on by the progressive brain damage that the time-traveling causes – and eventually committing suicide. In the last of the flickering images, Nick himself is shown recovering in a hospital bed from serious injuries.

== Cast ==
- Eric Lively as Nick Larson
- Erica Durance as Julie Miller
- Dustin Milligan as Trevor Eastman
- Gina Holden as Amanda
- David Lewis as Dave Bristol
- Andrew Airlie as Ron Callahan
- Chris Gauthier as Ted
- Susan Hogan as Katherine Larson
- J. R. Bourne as Malcolm Williams
- Lindsay Maxwell as Grace Callahan
- Zoran Vukelic as Christopher

== Critical reception ==
The Butterfly Effect 2 was met with negative reviews. Reviewers claim that the sequel adds nothing to the message of the first movie, covering exactly the same ground with different characters. With a limited temporal scope, the story of this movie isn't as intertwined as the first. Also, the less-impressive special effects and very short filming time combine to give the movie a much less impressive feel than the original. It received a negative reception from Reel Film Reviews, which called it "An abominable, pointless sequel."
