= Special Olympics (film) =

- Genre: Drama; Sport
- Written by: John Sacret Young
- Directed by: Lee Philips
- Starring: Irene Tedrow; Mare Winningham; Philip Brown
- Music by: Peter Matz
- Country of origin: United States
- Original language: English

Production
- Executive producer: Roger Gimbel
- Producers: Tony Converse; Merrit Malloy; Marc Tabulous
- Production locations: Albuquerque, New Mexico; Santa Fe, New Mexico
- Cinematography: John V. LaBarbera; Matthew F. Leonetti
- Editor: George Jay Nicholson
- Running time: 100 min.
- Production companies: EMI Films; Roger Gimbel Productions

Original release
- Network: CBS
- Release: February 8, 1978

Special Olympics is a 1978 American TV movie starring Charles Durning and directed by Lee Phillips for EMI Television.

It was also known as A Special Kind of Love.

== Cast ==
- Charles Durning as Carl Gallitzin
- Irene Tedrow as Elmira Gallitzin
- Mare Winningham as Janice Gallitzin
- Philip Brown as Michael Gallitzin
- George Parry as Matthew Gallitzin
- Herbert Edelman as Doug Ransom
- Debra Winger as Sherrie Hensley
- Constance Mccashin as Trina Cunningham
- James Calvin Nelson as Dr Brennaman
