= Monster-in-Law =

2005 film by Robert Luketic

- Theatrical release poster
- Directed by: Robert Luketic
- Written by: Anya Kochoff
- Produced by: Chris Bender; J.C. Spink; Paula Weinstein
- Starring: Jennifer Lopez; Jane Fonda; Michael Vartan; Wanda Sykes; Monet Mazur; Elaine Stritch
- Cinematography: Russell Carpenter
- Edited by: Scott Hill; Kevin Tent
- Music by: David Newman
- Production companies: BenderSpink; Spring Creek Pictures
- Distributed by: New Line Cinema (Worldwide); Warner Bros. Pictures (Germany and Austria)
- Release dates: May 5, 2005 (Atlanta); May 13, 2005 (United States); May 26, 2005 (Germany)
- Running time: 101 minutes
- Countries: United States; Germany
- Language: English
- Budget: $43 million
- Box office: $155.4 million

Monster-in-Law is a 2005 romantic comedy film directed by Robert Luketic, written by Anya Kochoff and starring Jennifer Lopez, Jane Fonda, Michael Vartan, and Wanda Sykes. It marked a return to cinema for Fonda, being her first film in 15 years since Stanley & Iris in 1990.

Temp Charlotte Cantillini's love life has been stagnant for ages--until she repeatedly cross paths with Dr. Kevin Fields and they instantly connect. Soon, their relationship advances so she meets his controlling mother Violet, who goes to great lengths to separate them.

The film was negatively received by critics who praised Fonda's performance but panned the screenplay. Monster-in-Law was a box office success, grossing $155 million on a $43 million budget.

== Plot ==
Charlie Cantilini is a temp/dog walker/yoga instructor and aspiring fashion designer from Venice Beach, California, who meets doctor Kevin Fields. At first, she believes he is gay, but Kevin later asks her out, and she feels she has finally found the right man.

Things start to sour when Kevin introduces Charlie to his mother Viola, a former newscaster turned talk show host. She was recently replaced by a much younger woman, leading her to have a meltdown and attack 16-year-old music pop star Tanya Murphy, and be committed to a facility for several months.

Loathing Charlie immediately because of her occupation as a temp, Viola becomes more distraught when Kevin proposes to her, fearing she will lose her son the same way she lost her career. Determined to ruin Kevin and Charlie's relationship, she enlists the help of her loyal assistant Ruby, and Kevin's vindictive ex-girlfriend Fiona, who had previously misled Charlie into believing that Kevin was gay.

At the engagement party, Fiona kisses Kevin in his dressing room, deeply hurting Charlie, who feels out of place in Kevin’s world, precisely as Viola and Fiona planned. Viola feigns an anxiety attack and moves in with Charlie while Kevin is away for a medical conference, hoping to drive her crazy with her antics.

Charlie soon realizes Viola's plan and retaliates by destroying her bedroom and tampering with her antipsychotic medication (which Viola had replaced with vitamin C tablets). Charlie eventually confronts her, forcing her to move out. Finding no way to stop the wedding, Viola tricks Charlie into eating nuts during the rehearsal dinner. This causes an extreme allergic reaction, which causes Charlie's face and tongue to swell. Luckily, it subsides by the next morning.

On the day of the wedding, Viola turns up wearing an extravagant white dress instead of the peach-colored one Charlie had specially made for her. This leads to a violent standoff between them, with Viola refusing to accept her and declaring Charlie will never be good enough for Kevin.

Suddenly, Viola's dreadful mother-in-law, Kevin's grandmother Gertrude, arrives, and they have an indignant argument. Gertrude holds Viola responsible for the death of her son, Kevin's father, many years earlier, claiming he died of "terminal disappointment”, while Viola claims Gertrude is responsible, as she “smothered him to death”, because she believed that no woman would ever be good enough for him. Gertrude's resentment of Viola resembles Viola's animosity towards Charlie, who decides to back down because she feels the same thing will happen to them in 30 years.

Charlie leaves to tell Kevin the wedding is off, but Ruby finally gets through to Viola. She resents being compared to Gertrude, but Ruby points out that Viola is far worse as Gertrude never tried to poison her, (referring to the nuts at the rehearsal dinner). She also reveals that Gertrude also wore black to Viola's wedding because she was "in mourning" for her son, an equally disrespectful mirror of Viola's behavior. When Viola claims she wants her son to be happy, Ruby asks her why she thinks he is not.

Viola has an epiphany, ultimately realizing she wants Charlie to stay. She tells her that she will leave the couple alone if that means her son is happy. Charlie, however, tells Viola that she wants her to be a part of their lives, so they set some boundaries and ground rules.

Charlie and Kevin get married, and Viola (now wearing the peach-colored dress) catches the bouquet. As the newlyweds drive away to their honeymoon in Hawaii, Viola and Ruby leave to go out drinking.

== Cast ==
- Jennifer Lopez as Charlotte "Charlie" Cantilini
- Jane Fonda as Viola Fields
- Michael Vartan as Dr. Kevin Fields
- Wanda Sykes as Ruby
- Adam Scott as Remy
- Monet Mazur as Fiona
- Annie Parisse as Morgan
- Will Arnett as Kit
- Elaine Stritch as Gertrude Fields
- Stephen Dunham as Dr. Paul Chamberlain

== Reception ==
On the review aggregator website Rotten Tomatoes, 19% of 167 critics' reviews are positive. The website's consensus reads: "While Jane Fonda steals the movie in her return to the screen, a tired script and flimsy performances make this borderline comedy fall flat." On Metacritic the film has a weighted average score of 31 out of 100, based on 38 critics, indicating "generally unfavorable reviews". Audiences polled by CinemaScore gave the film an average grade of "B+" on an A+ to F scale.

Roger Ebert of the Chicago Sun-Times gave the film one out of possible four stars, saying: "You do not keep Jane Fonda offscreen for 15 years, only to bring her back as a specimen of rabid Momism. You write a role for her. It makes sense. It fits her. You like her in it. It gives her a relationship with Jennifer Lopez that could plausibly exist in our time and space. It gives her a son who has not wandered over after the E.R. auditions. And it doesn't supply a supporting character who undercuts every scene she's in by being more on-topic than any of the leads." Joe Morgenstern of the Wall Street Journal also panned the movie, and used his review to deride the state of big-budget film-making, writing: "Films like this ... are emblematic of Hollywood's relentless dumbing-down and defining-down of big-screen attractions. There's an audience for such stuff, but little enthusiasm or loyalty. Adult moviegoers are being ignored almost completely during all but the last two or three months of each year, while even the kids who march off to the multiplexes each weekend know they're getting moldy servings of same-old, rather than entertainments that feed their appetite for surprise and delight." Mick LaSalle of the San Francisco Chronicle was one of the few critics who gave the film a positive review, writing: "It's a crude, obvious comedy, which occasionally clunks, but it's often very funny, as well as being a really shrewd bit of popular entertainment. Its appeal resides in a lot of things, not the least of which is a sophisticated awareness of what an audience brings to it."

=== Box office ===
The film ran 849 sneak preview screenings on Mother's Day at 4pm, the Sunday before release. New Line's president of domestic distribution David Tuckerman publicly stated his doubts about this strategy but the film achieved 90% attendance and he stated "the marketing department hit a home run." The film became a box-office success debuting at number #1 at the box office during its first weekend and earning $24 million. By the end of its run, the movie earned $83 million at the domestic box office and a worldwide total of $154.7 million, against an estimated production budget of $43 million.

=== Accolades ===
Lopez earned a Golden Raspberry Award nomination for Worst Actress for her performance in the film, but lost to Jenny McCarthy for Dirty Love.

== Television series ==
On October 13, 2014, it was reported that Fox was developing a television series based on the film with Amy B. Harris as creator. In 2021, E! reported that the series "didn't ultimately happen".
