= Final Destination (score) =

Final Destination: The Complete Original Motion Picture Score

Film score by Shirley Walker
- Released: March 17, 2000
- Genre: Film score
- Length: 47:53
- Label: Weendigo Records

Shirley Walker soundtrack chronology
Superman: The Animated Series (1999)	Final Destination: The Complete Original Motion Picture Score (2000)	Final Destination 2: Original Motion Picture Score (2003)

Final Destination: The Complete Original Motion Picture Score is the score album to the 2000 supernatural horror film Final Destination directed by James Wong and featured musical score composed by Shirley Walker. The album was released on March 17, 2000 through Weendigo Records.

== Development ==
Wong and Glen Morgan initially wanted Walker to score the film after having previously worked with her on their sci-fi television series Space: Above and Beyond. Walker said, "[Morgan and Wong] are great believers in melody and having music for the characters and situations they find themselves in. Of course, the atmosphere had to be there also, especially for a film with as much suspense building as this film has".

The score is mostly low-key, with the exception of the suspense and death scenes. It was performed by a union orchestra, obliging New Line Cinema to grant the film its own score. Walker described her score as "very theme-driven, conservative music that covers the range from bizarre animal noises with stronger visceral impact to stirring emotional music with well-defined melodies that evolve through the storytelling". The "Main Title" piece, used for the opening credits, was rare for opening a film aimed at a youth audience at the time. "What a treat for me to get to write a piece that calls you into the movie and lets you know something bad is going to happen from the get-go", Walker said. According to Walker, "Main Title" consumed most of her time, due to its "dark theme and counter-melody which carries throughout the score".

== Critical reception ==
The score was positively received by critics. Judge Harold Jervais of DVD Verdict wrote how "[the sound effects, dialogue and] Walker's wonderfully creepy and effective score are mixed together to form a very pleasing, almost organic-like whole". Mike Long of DVD Review said that "Shirley Walker's eerie score comes across powerfully with a wide spatial integration". Derek Germano of The Cinema Laser wrote that "Walker's creepy musical score is really a winner, and is one of the things that will help to make Final Destination a minor genre classic a few years down the road". R. C. Jara of Dread Central summarised "Walker’s score captures the emotional rollercoaster of loss after loss."

== Track listing ==
No.	Title	Length
1.	"Main Titles"	3:05
2.	"Flight 180"	3:40
3.	"Departure"	2:22
4.	"Early Exit"	1:01
5.	"The Parents Arrive"	1:53
6.	"Premonition"	1:47
7.	"Tod"	6:51
8.	"A Visit To Clear"	1:27
9.	"The Morgue"	2:41
10.	"Death's Design"	1:46
11.	"Mrs Lewton"	4:43
12.	"Clear's Story"	1:20
13.	"Who's Next?"	1:53
14.	"Safe House"	3:19
15.	"Alex's Revelation/Race Against Death"	9:50
16.	"Six Months Later"	1:26
