= John R. Leonetti =

American cinematographer and film director

- Born: John Robert Leonetti; July 4, 1956 (age 70); California, U.S.
- Occupations: Cinematographer, film director
- Years active: 1981–2013 (cinematography); 1997–present (director)
- Relatives: Matthew F. Leonetti (brother)

John Robert Leonetti, ASC (born July 4, 1956) is an American cinematographer and film director.

== Career ==
Leonetti began his career as a teenager working for his family's motion picture equipment business that was started by his father Frank Leonetti, known for his gaffing work on films such as The Wizard of Oz and Singin' in the Rain.

== Filmography ==
=== Director ===
Film

Year	Title	Ref.
1997	Mortal Kombat: Annihilation	
2006	The Butterfly Effect 2	
2014	Annabelle	
2016	Wolves at the Door	
2017	Wish Upon	
2019	The Silence	
2022	Lullaby	
TBA	At the Hop †	

Television

Year	Title	Episode(s)
1999	Sons of Thunder	"Underground"
1999	Sons of Thunder	"Thunder by Your Side"
2001	Providence	"It Was a Dark and Stormy Night"
2015	Sleepy Hollow	"Pittura Infamante"

=== Cinematographer ===
Film

Year	Title	Director	Notes	Refs.
1991	Child's Play 3	Jack Bender		
1993	Hot Shots! Part Deux	Jim Abrahams		
1994	The Mask	Chuck Russell		
1995	Mortal Kombat	Paul W. S. Anderson		
1996	Spy Hard	Rick Friedberg		
1999	Detroit Rock City	Adam Rifkin		
2001	Joe Dirt	Dennie Gordon		
2002	The Scorpion King	Chuck Russell		
2003	Honey	Bille Woodruff		
2004	Raise Your Voice	Sean McNamara		
2005	The Perfect Man	Mark Rosman		
2006	The Woods	Lucky McKee		
2007	Dead Silence	James Wan		
2007	I Know Who Killed Me	Chris Sivertson		
2007	Death Sentence	James Wan		
2007	Welcome to the Jungle	Jonathan Hensleigh	Also editor	
2010	Ca$h	Stephen Milburn Anderson	With Robert Primes	
2010	Piranha 3D	Alexandre Aja		
2010	Super Hybrid	Eric Valette		
2010	Insidious	James Wan	With David M. Brewer	
2011	Soul Surfer	Sean McNamara		
2013	The Conjuring	James Wan		
2013	Insidious: Chapter 2	James Wan		

Television

Year	Title	Director	Notes
1989-1993	Tales from the Crypt		12 episodes
1992	Raven	Craig R. Baxley	Episode "Return of the Black Dragon"
1996	Kindred: The Embraced	Peter Medak	Episode "Pilot"
2000	JAG	Tony Wharmby; Terrence O'Hara; Arthur W. Forney; Hugo Cortina	4 episodes
2000-2001	Providence		16 episodes
2012	The River		7 episodes
2013	Zero Hour	Stephen Williams; Mario Van Peebles; Jim McKay	4 episodes
2013	Sleepy Hollow	Paul Edwards; Ken Olin; Liz Friedlander	3 episodes

Ref.:
