= C. W. Nevius =

American journalist

Charles William Nevius is an American journalist who is currently a sports reporter for The Press Democrat in Santa Rosa, California. Most notably, he was a columnist for the San Francisco Chronicle. He usually appears in the Bay Area section of the newspaper, although he was in the sports section for years, where he was known for his breezy writing style. He writes almost exclusively about San Francisco politics, though he had long lived in the suburban East Bay until May 2010, when he moved to San Francisco.

In 2012, he was criticized for a column detailing an incident where Nevius almost hit a cyclist, and criticizing the cyclist's reaction after the near collision. Nevius was also criticized for his claim that "careless pedestrians" are mainly at fault for vehicle-pedestrian collisions.
