= Eric Bress =

American screenwriter

- Born: United States
- Occupations: Film director, screenwriter, film producer
- Known for: The Butterfly Effect; Final Destination 2

Eric Bress is an American screenwriter, film director and producer, best known for his work on the Final Destination series and The Butterfly Effect. He frequently collaborates with J. Mackye Gruber.

Bress received a secondary education from Hackley School in Tarrytown, New York, and is a graduate of Syracuse University, where he studied film. He is originally from New York. He worked as a sound engineer before becoming a screenwriter.

== Filmography ==
=== Film ===
Title	Year	Credited as			Notes
Title	Year	Director	Producer	Writer	Notes
Fast, Cheap & Out of Control	1997	No	No	No	Production assistant
Blunt	1998	No	Yes	Yes	
Final Destination 2	2003	No	No	Yes	
The Butterfly Effect	2004	Yes	No	Yes	
Cellular	2004	No	No	No	Script revisions (uncredited)
The Final Destination	2009	No	No	Yes	
Ghosts of War	2020	Yes	No	Yes	

=== Television ===
Title	Year	Credited as				Network	Notes
Title	Year	Creator	Director	Writer	Executive producer	Network	Notes
Kyle XY	2006–09	Yes	No	Yes	Yes	ABC Family	Wrote 2 episodes
