= J. Mackye Gruber =

American screenwriter and film director

- Born: United States
- Occupation(s): Film director, screenwriter
- Known for: Final Destination 2 The Butterfly Effect

Jonathan Gruber, more commonly known as J. Mackye Gruber, is an American screenwriter and film director, best known for co-writing Final Destination 2 and co-writing and co-directing The Butterfly Effect.

Gruber has frequently collaborated with Eric Bress.

Gruber is a graduate of USC School of Cinematic Arts. He has a background in cinematography.

== Filmography ==
=== Film ===
Title	Year	Credited as			Notes
Title	Year	Director	Writer	Producer	Notes
Aquaphobia	1997	No	No	No	Short film; underwater photographer
Blunt	1998	Yes	No	Yes	
Final Destination 2	2003	No	Yes	No	
The Butterfly Effect	2004	Yes	Yes	No	
Cellular	2004	No	No	No	Script revisions (uncredited)
The Courier	2015	Yes	Yes	No	Short film

=== Television ===
Title	Year	Credited as				Network	Notes
Title	Year	Creator	Director	Writer	Executive producer	Network	Notes
Kyle XY	2006–09	Yes	No	Yes	Yes	ABC Family	Wrote 2 episodes
