= The Expendables (soundtrack) =

The Expendables: Original Motion Picture Soundtrack

Film score by Brian Tyler
- Released: August 10, 2010
- Recorded: 2010
- Length: 71:41
- Label: Lionsgate Studios
- Producer: Selena Arizanovic

Brian Tyler chronology
| Law Abiding Citizen (2009) | The Expendables (2010) | Battle: Los Angeles (2011) |

The Expendables chronology
| The Expendables (2010) | The Expendables 2 (2012) |

The Expendables: Original Motion Picture Soundtrack is the soundtrack to the 2010 film The Expendables directed by Sylvester Stallone. Featuring music composed by Brian Tyler, the soundtrack consisted of 20 tracks which was released by Lionsgate Records on August 10, 2010.

== Background ==
Composer Brian Tyler announced on his official website that he had been hired to write original music for the film; he previously worked with Stallone on Rambo (2008). Tyler employed an 80-piece orchestra from the Czech Philharmonic and recorded the score for three months. The score album was announced in mid-July 2010 and eventually distributed through Lionsgate's music label on August 10, three days before the film's release.

The Japanese version uses the song "Kizuna" by Tsuyoshi Nagabuchi as an Image song.

== Reception ==
Professional ratings
Review scores
| Source | Rating |
|---|---|
| AllMusic | 3.5/5 stars |

Glen Chapman of Den of Geek called it as "one of the finest scores for an action movie". Filmtracks.com wrote "Tyler succeeds in his task of bringing a bit more depth to today's average action fare [...] While most composers of his generation would be happy to serve up two-star trash to earn a paycheck for this kind of movie, Tyler continues to strive for better results." William Ruhlmann of AllMusic wrote "For the most part, the redemption here consists of the victory of good guys over bad guys, and the emotion is the feeling of triumph overcoming seemingly long odds." A critic from The Hollywood Reporter wrote that "Brian Tyler’s score too often reaches for bombast." Peter Debruge of Variety wrote "Brian Tyler’s temp-sounding score beats its drums and blows its horns".

== Additional music ==
Godsmack vocalist Sully Erna was approached by Stallone himself to write a song for the film. Erna showed him a potential unfinished piece of "Sinners Prayer" originally recorded for his debut album Avalon (2010); Stallone liked it and wanted to use it in the film. However, during the film's post-production, the scene that "Sinner's Prayer" was originally meant to be used in was reworked and the song was taken off the film. The American hard rock band Shinedown had recorded the song "Diamond Eyes (Boom-Lay Boom-Lay Boom)", specifically for the film, but was not included. The song was used in the theatrical trailer and the track in its entirety was released on June 15, 2010. Both songs were finally used for the Extended Director's Cut. One of the alternate trailers uses the song "Paradise City" by Guns N' Roses. The song "The Boys Are Back in Town" by Thin Lizzy (live version featured on Still Dangerous) played in TV spots and is played over the credits.

== Track listing ==
All music is composed by Brian Tyler.

The Expendables: Original Motion Picture Soundtrack track listing
| No. | Title | Length |
|---|---|---|
| 1. | "The Expendables" | 3:22 |
| 2. | "Aerial" | 2:58 |
| 3. | "Ravens and Skulls" | 4:49 |
| 4. | "Lee and Lacy" | 2:15 |
| 5. | "Massive" | 3:24 |
| 6. | "The Gulf of Aden" | 6:56 |
| 7. | "Lifeline" | 4:29 |
| 8. | "Confession" | 2:56 |
| 9. | "Royal Rumble" | 3:41 |
| 10. | "Scanning the Enemy" | 3:47 |
| 11. | "The Contact" | 1:31 |
| 12. | "Surveillance" | 3:27 |
| 13. | "Warriors" | 3:49 |
| 14. | "Trinity" | 4:19 |
| 15. | "Waterboard" | 3:01 |
| 16. | "Losing His Mind" | 2:37 |
| 17. | "Take Your Money" | 2:41 |
| 18. | "Giant with a Shotgun" | 3:57 |
| 19. | "Time to Leave" | 1:55 |
| 20. | "Mayhem and Finale" | 5:47 |

== Personnel ==
Credits adapted from liner notes.

- Music – Brian Tyler
- Album producer – Selena Arizanovic
- Performer – The Czech Philharmonic
- Orchestration and arrangement – Andrew Kinney, Brad Warnaar, Brian Tyler, Dana Niu, Keith Power, Matt Margeson, Pakk Hui, Robert Elhai, Tony Morales
- Orchestra conductor – Adam Klemens, Brian Tyler
- Orchestra contractor – James Fitzpatrick
- Recording – Jan Holzner
- Mixing – Bobby Fernandez
- Music editor – Kyle Clausen
- Music preparation – Eric Stonerook
- Music co-ordinator – Joe Lisanti
- Music supervisor – Gary L. Krause, Selena Arizanovic
