= The Expendables =

The Expendables may refer to:

== Films ==
- The Expendables (1962 film), a made-for-TV film starring Mike Connors
- The Expendables (1988 film), by Cirio H. Santiago
- The Expendables (2000 film), a made-for-TV film starring Brett Cullen
- The Expendables (franchise), an American ensemble action film series co-written and developed by Sylvester Stallone
  - The Expendables (2010 film), the first film in the series
  - The Expendables 2, the sequel to the 2010 film
  - The Expendables 3, the sequel to the 2012 film
  - Expend4bles, the sequel to the 2014 film

== Other uses ==
- The Expendables Go to Hell, a comic/graphic novel based on the film franchise
- The Expendables (American band)
- The Expendables (New Zealand band)

== See also ==
- Expendable (disambiguation)
- Expendables (role-playing game), a tabletop role-playing game
