= The Expendables 2 (soundtrack) =

The Expendables 2: Original Motion Picture Soundtrack

Soundtrack album by Brian Tyler
- Released: August 14, 2012
- Recorded: 2012
- Genre: Film score
- Length: 56:45
- Label: Lionsgate
- Producer: Brian Tyler

Brian Tyler chronology
Brake (2012)	The Expendables 2 (2012)	Iron Man 3 (2013)

The Expendables soundtracks chronology
The Expendables (2010)	The Expendables 2 (2012)	The Expendables 3 (2014)

The Expendables 2: Original Motion Picture Soundtrack is the soundtrack accompanying the 2012 film The Expendables 2, a sequel to The Expendables and the second installment in the film franchise. Featuring a musical score composed by Brian Tyler, the 14-track album was released through Lionsgate Records on August 14, 2012.

== Background ==
Brian Tyler, who scored the first film, had returned for composing The Expendables 2. The score combined percussion and electronic elements with orchestral music, with an 80-piece orchestra from the Slovakia National Symphony Orchestra, co-conducted and orchestrated by Tyler with Allan Wilson and Marian Turner. The 14-track album was released through Lionsgate Records on iTunes on August 14, 2012, three days before the film's release.

== Reception ==
Empire's Danny Graydon awarded the soundtrack a score of 4 out of 5, and said "Tyler's action fare is, as ever, superbly judged, mixing real thrills with some dramatic weight... resulting in a score that is affectionately nostalgic and not riddled with cliché." Filmtracks.com wrote "As an overall listening experience on album, The Expendables 2 is a worthy extension of the straight action portions of the 2010 score (with few breathers), and thankfully the album length has been shortened to limit sonic exhaustion."

Thomas Glorieux of Maintitles wrote "The Expendables 2 is a must buy, considering it's almost non stop action material from start to finish". Daniel Schweiger of Assignment X wrote "Brian Tyler guns down the action again for a spruced-up geritol team supreme". Justin Lowe of The Hollywood Reporter wrote "though the soundtrack would have benefited from a higher ratio of contemporary hits to familiar classics, Brian Tyler's score carries the action without overwhelming it."

== Additional music ==
Several popular songs also appear in the film, including "The Wanderer" by Dion DiMucci, "Mustang Sally" by Mack Rice, "Crystal Blue Persuasion" by Tommy James & the Shondells, "Groovin'" and "Beautiful Morning" by The Young Rascals, "Rip It Up" by Little Richard, "I Just Want to Celebrate" by Rare Earth, and "You Don't Want to Fight with Me" by Stallone's younger brother Frank Stallone.

== Track listing ==
All music is composed by Brian Tyler.

The Expendables 2: Original Motion Picture Soundtrack track listing
No.	Title	Length
1.	"The Expendables Return"	4:40
2.	"Fists Knives and Chains"	3:05
3.	"Track 'Em Find 'Em Kill 'Em"	4:54
4.	"Making an Entrance"	4:08
5.	"Respect"	3:58
6.	"Rest in Pieces"	2:55
7.	"Preparations"	3:15
8.	"Party Crashers"	5:19
9.	"Rescue"	4:43
10.	"Countdown"	4:25
11.	"Bad Way to Live"	3:41
12.	"Vilain"	2:42
13.	"Dueling Blades"	4:32
14.	"Escape"	4:28

== Personnel ==
Credits adapted from production notes.

- Music performed by Brian Tyler and the Slovakia National Symphony Orchestra
- Music recorded at Brian Tyler Studios and Slovak Radio Concert Hall
- Music conductors – Allan Wilson, Marian Turner and Brian Tyler
- Music editor – Joe Lisanti
- Assistant music editor – Kyle Clausen
- Temp music editor – Shannon Erbe
- Orchestrations – Brian Tyler, Dana Niu, Robert Elhai and Brad Warnaar
- Musical arrangements – Robert Lydecker, Tony Morales and Sarah Schachner
- Music mixing – Frank Wolf and Brian Tyler
- Orchestra contractor – Paul Talkington
- Recording engineer – Peter Fuchs
- Music preparation – Eric Stonerook
- Orchestra manager – Marian Turner
- Score coordinators – Matthew Llewellyn and Jonathan Bartz
- Music librarian – Vladimir Martinka
- Score recordist – Martin Roller
- Music intern – John Mcmillan
- On-camera band – Chuck Power and the Decatur Street Band
- Music supervisor – Selena Arizanovic
- Music supervisor assistant – Cassandra Howland

== Accolades ==
Accolades for The Expendables 2: Original Motion Picture Soundtrack
Award	Category	Recipient and nominee	Result	Ref.
BMI Film & TV Awards	Film Music Award	Brian Tyler (Also for Iron Man 3 (2013) and the television series Hawaii Five-0)	Won	
