= Aliens vs. Predator: Requiem (soundtrack) =

Aliens vs. Predator: Requiem (Original Motion Picture Soundtrack)

Soundtrack album by Brian Tyler
- Released: December 11, 2007
- Studios: Newman Scoring Stage, Century City, California
- Genres: Orchestral; Film score
- Length: 77:11
- Labels: Varèse Sarabande; Fox Music
- Producers: Brian Tyler; Robert Townson

Brian Tyler soundtrack chronology
Finishing the Game (2007)	Aliens vs. Predator: Requiem (2007)	Rambo (2008)

Professional ratings
Review scores
Source	Rating
Allmusic	0/5 stars

Aliens vs. Predator: Requiem (Original Motion Picture Soundtrack) is the official soundtrack album of the 2007 science fiction film Aliens vs. Predator: Requiem. It was composed and conducted by Brian Tyler, performed by the Hollywood Studio Symphony and released on December 11, 2007, by Varèse Sarabande and Fox Music. The score is completely orchestral and incorporates several themes from both the Alien and Predator franchises.

== Background ==
The film's main theme track is a clash of two main themes, one consisting of the Predator type theme (bongos and basses) and the second of the Aliens (high pitched violins, violas and flutes). The directors Greg and Colin Strause wanted to take a new direction from Harald Kloser's Alien vs. Predator score and wanted Tyler to use some reference to the three films' original score pieces, such as the horrific violas and percussion from James Horner's Aliens and the primitive tribal percussion from Alan Silvestri's Predator and Predator 2. Tyler also referenced composers Elliot Goldenthal's Alien 3 and John Frizzell's Alien Resurrection into the score.

== Track listing ==
No.	Title	Length
1.	"Aliens vs. Predator: Requiem"	1:28
2.	"Opening Titles"	3:04
3.	"Decimation Proclamation"	7:42
4.	"Requiem Epilogue"	3:11
5.	"National Guard Part 1"	5:44
6.	"National Guard Part 2"	2:56
7.	"Taking Sides"	13:05
8.	"Predicide"	1:30
9.	"Kelly Returns Home"	1:19
10.	"Coprocloakia"	5:32
11.	"Power Struggle"	4:02
12.	"Skinned and Hanged"	2:48
13.	"Down to Earth"	2:36
14.	"Predator Arrival"	3:37
15.	"Special Delivery"	2:31
16.	"Alien Awakening"	2:07
17.	"Striptease"	1:31
18.	"Buddy’s New Buddy"	1:59
19.	"Searching the Poolhouse"	3:11
20.	"Gutless and Autosurgiosis"	2:43
21.	"Outnumbered"	4:45
Total length:		77:11

== Personnel ==
- Composed by [Music], Conductor [Music], Producer – Brian Tyler
- Edited by [Music Editor] – Joe Lisanti
- Executive producer – Robert Townson
- Performed by – The Hollywood Studio Symphony
- Recorded by [Digital Recording By] – Bob Wolfe

℗ © 2007 Twentieth Century Fox Film Corporation
