= The Expendables 3 (soundtrack) =

The Expendables 3: Original Motion Picture Soundtrack

Film score by Brian Tyler
- Released: August 12, 2014
- Recorded: 2014
- Genre: Film score
- Length: 60:09
- Labels: Lionsgate Records; La-La Land
- Producers: Brian Tyler; Matthew Llewellyn

Brian Tyler chronology
Teenage Mutant Ninja Turtles (2014)	The Expendables 3 (2014)	Into the Storm (2014)

The Expendables chronology
The Expendables 2 (2012)	The Expendables 3 (2014)	Expend4bles (2023)

The Expendables 3: Original Motion Picture Soundtrack is the soundtrack to the 2014 film The Expendables 3, a sequel to The Expendables 2 (2012) and the third instalment in The Expendables franchise. Featuring musical score composed by Brian Tyler, the soundtrack was released through Lionsgate Records and La-La Land Records on August 12, 2014.

== Development ==
Recurring franchise collaborator, Brian Tyler scored The Expendables 3 after doing the same for the predecessors. Describing the third film's score, Tyler recalled that it had a "Sergio Leone / Ennio Morricone type of vibe to the film, and the score" due to its action themes which increase with each sequel. He wrote a counter-piece cue that resembled a waltz with piano and strings and had eventually implemented orchestral elements with guitar, cello, percussion, drums, timpani, trombone and brass instruments. The main theme had an epic quality, that resembled Harry Potter, Star Wars and Indiana Jones.

Tyler felt that the music for the third film was different to its predecessors, albeit reusing themes from the previous instalments and also had "fun" on writing music for new characters. For the antagonist Stonebanks (Mel Gibson), Tyler wrote a solo piano piece that contrasted the character's nature and stance; he did the same for Loki (Tom Hiddleston) in Thor: The Dark World (2013). He added "I thought more of an etude would work really great so it"s not just arch [...] It shows he has an interesting villainy; there are wheels turning in that brain."

== Reception ==
Filmtracks.com wrote "Overall, this score is as much a disappointment as the film, lacking all vestiges of the personality of the original." James Southall of Movie Wave wrote "The Expandables 3 is an enjoyable album, but it does feature some less interesting passages and (understandably) some of the better parts are very similar to those heard in the previous scores." Thomas Glorieux of Maintitles wrote "In general, if you heard the first and passed through the second, you aren't missing anything." Justin Chang of Variety and Justin Lowe of The Hollywood Reporter called the score as "disappointing" and "predictable".

== Track listing ==
The Expendables 3: Original Motion Picture Soundtrack track listing
No.	Title	Length
1.	"The Drop"	2:28
2.	"Lament"	2:00
3.	"Right on Time"	3:14
4.	"The Art of War"	0:57
5.	"Stonebanks Lives"	5:27
6.	"Too Much Faith"	2:36
7.	"Late for War"	3:17
8.	"Descent into War"	3:57
9.	"Bring You Luck"	1:54
10.	"Infiltrating the Block"	5:25
11.	"Threat Doubled"	2:28
12.	"Galgo's Grand Entrance"	0:29
13.	"Look Alive"	5:33
14.	"Package Secured"	2:55
15.	"We Were Brothers"	3:56
16.	"The Last Window"	2:03
17.	"Valet Parking Done Right"	3:26
18.	"Moral Chess Games"	2:02
19.	"Armored Freaking Transport"	6:02
Total length:		60:09

== Personnel ==
Credits adapted from liner notes.

- Arrangements – Robert Lydecker, Evan Duffy, Matthew Llewellyn, Tony Morales
- Composer – Brian Tyler
- Contractor – Paul Talkington
- Music co-ordinator – Evan Duffy, Seth Glennie-Smith
- Copyist – Eric Stonerook
- Editing – Gary L. Krause, Shannon Erbe
- Recording – Peter Fuchs
- Mixing – Brian Tyler, Frank Wolf
- Performer – Brian Tyler, The Slovakia National Symphony Orchestra
- Producer – Brian Tyler, Matthew Llewellyn
