= Ready or Not (soundtrack) =

Ready or Not (Original Motion Picture Soundtrack)

Film score by Brian Tyler
- Released: August 21, 2019
- Recorded: 2019
- Genre: Film score
- Length: 62:55
- Label: Fox Music
- Producer: Brian Tyler

Brian Tyler chronology
Liberation (2019)	Ready or Not (Original Motion Picture Soundtrack) (2019)	Rambo: Last Blood (2019)

Ready or Not (Original Motion Picture Soundtrack) is the film score to the 2019 film Ready or Not directed by Matt Bettinelli-Olpin and Tyler Gillett, starring Samara Weaving, Adam Brody, Mark O'Brien, Elyse Levesque, Nicky Guadagni, Henry Czerny and Andie MacDowell. The score, composed by Brian Tyler, was released through Fox Music on August 21, 2019.

== Background ==
Brian Tyler composed the film score. He utilized chamber music and orchestral elements for recording the score, while further emphasizing on synthesizers and electronic instruments. Olpin and Gillett liked the score which found that it suited the fun and thrill mood of the film.

Ready or Not is Tyler's first collaboration with the directors, and who would later continue to collaborate on all of his future projects.

== Reception ==
Jonathan Broxton of Movie Music UK wrote "Ready or Not is a fun action-horror score that never takes itself seriously, but is musically accomplished enough to be worth exploring. The main theme is a wonderfully elegant throwback to the 1990s, and Tyler is clever enough to manipulate it into numerous variations and deconstructions which allow it to run throughout the entire score without becoming tiresome. The action music is bold, ballsy, and occasionally over-the-top, but consistently entertaining, with some especially notable rhythmic ideas and moments of devastating dissonance that will absolutely appeal to fans of the genre. This is one score that you won’t want to hide from, and that you’ll want to seek out immediately." Peter Debruge of Variety and John DeFore of The Hollywood Reporter described the score as "thrilling" and "spine-chilling".

Ian Freer of Empire wrote "Brian Tyler's propulsive score, all driving rhythms and scratchy violins, that pushes the action forward without ever sacrificing the gothic-y mood." Andrew Parker of TheGATE.ca described it a "memorably jauny score". Angelica Jade Bastién of Vulture said, "the heavy-handed score by Brian Taylor that doesn't trust the audience and often lessens the impact of the film's most thrilling moments." Stylist wrote "The score, by Brian Tyler (usually to be found in the Marvel Universe) is perfect". Chris Bumbray of JoBlo.com wrote "the score by Brian Tyler is memorably eccentric." Christopher John of The Curb wrote "Composer Brian Tyler, who I have had problems within his past scores (mostly Marvel stuff), delivers an effective, thrilling, delicate and sumptuous score that thoroughly surprised me and work so well in tandem with the story taking place."

== Track listing ==
No.	Title	Length
1.	"Ready Or Not Overture"	4:24
2.	"Ready or Nocturne for Solo Violin"	1:23
3.	"Family Members Only"	3:41
4.	"The Truth"	3:14
5.	"Here We Come"	3:32
6.	"Badass Bride"	3:08
7.	"Mistaken Identity"	3:20
8.	"Our Burden"	2:34
9.	"Gearing Up"	2:09
10.	"The Future Mrs. Le Domas"	2:29
11.	"Tea Time"	3:42
12.	"Waiter, Dumb"	2:35
13.	"The Butler's Sonatina"	1:02
14.	"The Pit"	4:15
15.	"'Til Death Do Us Part"	2:31
16.	"Joy (B)ride"	4:52
17.	"The Ritual"	6:29
18.	"I Choose Her"	3:29
19.	"The Hide and Seek Song (Headquarters Music)"	1:54
20.	"Love Me Tender (Stereo Jane)"	2:12
Total length:		62:55
