= Fast Five (soundtrack) =

2011 album

Fast Five (Original Motion Picture Soundtrack)
- North American cover

Soundtrack album by various artists
- Released: April 25, 2011 (iTunes); May 3, 2011 (CD)
- Genres: Latin; reggaeton; hip hop; funk carioca; electronica; rock
- Length: 50:48
- Label: ABKCO
- Producers: Justin Lin (exec.); Neal H. Moritz (exec.)

Professional ratings
Review scores
Source	Rating
AllMusic	3/5 stars

Fast Five (Original Motion Picture Soundtrack) (released as Fast & Furious 5: Rio Heist (Original Motion Picture Soundtrack) outside the United States) is the soundtrack to Justin Lin's 2011 heist action film Fast Five. It was released through ABKCO Records on April 25, 2011, on iTunes with physical units available on May 3, 2011.

== Track listing ==
No.	Title	Writer(s)	Length
1.	"How We Roll (Fast Five Remix)" (performed by Don Omar, Busta Rhymes, Reek da Villian and J-Doe)	William Landrón Rivera; Trevor Smith; Tariek Williams; James Smith; Ruwanga Samath	4:09
2.	"Desabafo / Deixa Eu Dizer" (performed by Marcelo D2 and Cláudya)	Marcelo Maldonado Gomes Peixoto; Ivan Lins; Ronaldo Monteiro de Souza; Nave	2:56
3.	"Assembling the Team" (performed by Brian Tyler)	Brian Tyler	3:35
4.	"L. Gelada-3 Da Madrugada" (performed by MV Bill)	Alexandre Pereira Barbosa	7:20
5.	"Carlito Marron" (performed by Carlinhos Brown)	Carlinhos Brown; Arnaldo Antunes	4:07
6.	"Han Drifting" (performed by Hybrid)	Mike Truman; Charlotte James; Chris Healings	1:56
7.	"Million Dollar Race" (performed by Edu K and Hybrid)	Eduardo Martins Dorneles; Truman; James; Healings	2:24
8.	"Mad Skills" (performed by Brian Tyler)	Tyler	3:51
9.	"Batalha" (performed by ObandO)	Bruno Vinicius Bernardo de Souza; Fabio Costa Romano de Sant'Anna; Wellington Galdino de Oliveira	4:16
10.	"Danza Kuduro" (performed by Don Omar featuring Lucenzo)	Rivera; Philippe Louis de Oliveira; Fabrice Cyril Toigo; Faouze Barkati	3:19
11.	"Follow Me Follow Me (Quem Que Caguetou?) [Fast 5 Hybrid Remix]" (performed by Tejo, Black Alien & Speed)	Tejo Damasceno; Gustavo de Almeida Ribeiro; Cláudio Márcio de Souza Santos; Tagus Rafinha	3:07
12.	"Fast Five Suite" (performed by Brian Tyler)	Tyler	5:43
13.	"Furiously Dangerous" (performed by Ludacris featuring Slaughterhouse and Claret Jai)	Christopher Bridges; Dominick Wickliffe; Joe Budden; Joell Ortiz; Ryan Montgomery; Claret Jai; Denaun Porter; Tony Jackson; Luis Resto; Marshall Mathers	4:04

The tracks featured as background music in the film are "OA" and "Slim" by Euphon, "Big City" by Doug Simpson and Don Omar's "Taboo".

== Charts ==
=== Weekly charts ===
Chart (2011)	Peak position
Australian Albums (ARIA)	39
Austrian Albums (Ö3 Austria)	4
Belgian Albums (Ultratop Flanders)	59
Belgian Albums (Ultratop Wallonia)	74
French Albums (SNEP)	90
German Albums (Offizielle Top 100)	23
Mexican Albums (Top 100 Mexico)	26
Swiss Albums (Schweizer Hitparade)	7

=== Year-end charts ===
Chart (2011)	Position
Austrian Albums (Ö3 Austria)	66

== Fast Five (Original Motion Picture Score) ==
Fast Five (Original Motion Picture Score)

Film score by Brian Tyler
- Released: May 3, 2011
- Recorded: 2011
- Genre: Film score
- Length: 77:52
- Label: Varèse Sarabande
- Producer: Brian Tyler

Brian Tyler chronology
Battle: Los Angeles (2011)	Fast Five (2011)	Final Destination 5 (2011)

Fast Five (Original Motion Picture Score) is the film score to the film of the same name, featuring the score composed by Brian Tyler and performed by the Hollywood Studio Symphony. The album, with a total of 25 tracks, was released on CD by Varèse Sarabande with 77 minutes and 52 seconds' worth of music.

=== Track listing ===
No.	Title	Length
1.	"Fast Five"	3:03
2.	"The Perfect Crew"	2:02
3.	"Cristo Redentor"	2:40
4.	"Train Heist"	8:36
5.	"Remote Intel"	2:21
6.	"Hobbs"	3:01
7.	"Showdown on the Rio Niteroi"	1:37
8.	"Tapping In"	1:36
9.	"Turning Point"	3:47
10.	"Surveillance Montage"	2:28
11.	"Enemy of My Enemy"	3:36
12.	"Tego and Rico"	2:51
13.	"Hobbs Arrives"	1:54
14.	"Convergence"	5:45
15.	"Paradise"	1:45
16.	"Finding the Chip"	1:07
17.	"What Time Do They Open?"	1:35
18.	"Dom vs Hobbs"	3:08
19.	"Bus Busting"	1:30
20.	"Cheeky Bits"	2:40
21.	"The Job"	1:37
22.	"Connection"	4:23
23.	"The Vault Heist"	9:51
24.	"Full Circle"	3:29
25.	"Fast Five Coda"	0:51
Total length:		1:17:52
