= Expendable (disambiguation) =

Expendable is a novel by James Alan Gardner.

Expendable may also refer to:

- "Expendable" (short story), a science fiction story by Philip K. Dick
- The Expendables (2010 film), an action film by David Callaham and Sylvester Stallone
- Millennium Soldier: Expendable, a video game
- Expendable launch system, a type of space launch system where the first stage or tank structure of a rocket is used only once.

== See also ==
- The Expendables (disambiguation)
