= Thor: The Dark World (soundtrack) =

Thor: The Dark World (Original Motion Picture Soundtrack)

Film score by Brian Tyler
- Released: November 12, 2013
- Studio: Abbey Road Studios
- Genre: Film score
- Length: 1:17:11
- Labels: Hollywood; Marvel Music
- Producer: Brian Tyler

Brian Tyler chronology
Standing Up (2013)	Thor: The Dark World (Original Motion Picture Soundtrack) (2013)	Teenage Mutant Ninja Turtles: The Score (2014)

Professional ratings
Review scores
Source	Rating
Empire	4/5 stars
Movie Wave	4/5 stars

Thor: The Dark World (Original Motion Picture Soundtrack) is the film score for the Marvel Studios film, Thor: The Dark World by Brian Tyler, which was released by Hollywood Records in Europe on October 28, 2013. The album was released digitally in the United States on November 5, followed by a CD release on November 12, 2013. It is the first soundtrack in the Marvel Cinematic Universe to feature the "Marvel Studios Fanfare". All music was performed by the Philharmonia Orchestra of London and the London Philharmonic Orchestra. Vocals were performed by Tori Letzler.

== Background ==
In April 2013, it was announced that Carter Burwell had signed on to score Thor: The Dark World following Patrick Doyle who scored the first Thor film. In May 2013, Burwell departed the film due to creative differences. Kevin Feige, president of production at Marvel Studios explained, "It just didn't seem like the right fit, and we had to make a call early on. If post-production had been a year-and-a-half, we might have had time for trial and error, it might have worked." On June 18, 2013, Brian Tyler took over scoring duties from Burwell; Tyler previously scored Iron Man 3. Tyler said, "The feel of Thor is a very different than Iron Man. Yet they live in the same universe. For me, it's like somehow Indiana Jones showed up on the Enterprise; or something."

== Track listing ==
All music composed by Brian Tyler

No.	Title	Length
1.	"Thor: The Dark World"	2:10
2.	"Lokasenna"	2:31
3.	"Asgard"	1:55
4.	"Battle of Vanaheim"	1:39
5.	"Origins"	3:49
6.	"The Trial of Loki"	2:38
7.	"Into Eternity"	3:40
8.	"Escaping the Realm"	3:53
9.	"A Universe from Nothing"	2:20
10.	"Untouchable"	4:08
11.	"Thor, Son of Odin"	1:51
12.	"Shadows of Loki"	2:25
13.	"Sword and Council"	3:46
14.	"Invasion of Asgard"	2:59
15.	"Betrayal"	4:02
16.	"Journey to Asgard"	2:17
17.	"Uprising"	2:35
18.	"Vortex"	2:20
19.	"An Unlikely Alliance" (Includes "Captain America March" by Alan Silvestri)	3:47
20.	"Convergence"	3:42
21.	"Beginning of the End"	5:20
22.	"Deliverance"	2:21
23.	"Battle Between Worlds"	3:29
24.	"As the Hammer Falls"	2:40
25.	"Legacy"	4:08
26.	"Marvel Studios Fanfare"	0:29

== Charts ==
Weekly chart performance for Thor: The Dark World (Original Motion Picture Soundtrack)
Chart (2013)	Peak position
UK Soundtrack Albums (OCC)	12
