= Rambo: Last Blood (soundtrack) =

Rambo: Last Blood (Original Motion Picture Soundtrack)

Film score by Brian Tyler
- Released: September 20, 2019
- Recorded: 2019
- Studios: Slovak Radio Concert Hall, Bratislava, Slovakia
- Genre: Film score
- Length: 75:03
- Label: Lakeshore
- Producers: Brian Tyler; Joe Lisanti

Brian Tyler chronology
Ready or Not (2019)	Rambo: Last Blood (2019)	Charlie's Angels (2019)

Rambo: Last Blood (Original Motion Picture Soundtrack) is the film score to the 2019 film Rambo: Last Blood directed by Adrian Grünberg. A sequel to Rambo (2008) and the fifth installment in the Rambo film series, the film stars Sylvester Stallone reprising his lead role as Vietnam War veteran John Rambo. The film score is composed by Brian Tyler, which was recorded at the Slovak Radio Concert Hall. The album was released through Lakeshore Records on September 20, 2019.

== Development ==
Brian Tyler, who composed for Stallone on Rambo and The Expendables trilogy, returned to score Rambo: Last Blood. Speaking to Dread Central, Tyler considered it as a "very emotional story" and the music had to reflect the tone that Grünberg had set. Tyler had written a series of "heartfelt and passionate themes that echo Rambo's yearning for family, justice, requital, and compassion" and these ideas created a tonal tension which was challenging and rewarding for Tyler. He used strings, brass, percussions, piano and trumpets for the soundscape that reflected the themes of loss, regret, hope and vengeance. It was recorded at the Slovak Radio Concert Hall with Tyler conducting the Slovak Radio Symphony Orchestra.

== Release ==
Lakeshore Records released the soundtrack on September 20, 2019, the same day as the film's release. The album was further re-issued in vinyl LPs through Lakeshore and Enjoy the Ride Records, with multiple color variants:

- Clear with red splatter (2-LP)
- Black and red swirl (2-LP)
- Silver (combat knife silver) [2-LP]
- Red (Blood Red) [A-side and B-side]/Black (C-side and D-side)

== Track listing ==
No.	Title	Length
1.	"Rambo: Last Blood"	2:55
2.	"The Ranch"	3:11
3.	"Dusk"	2:36
4.	"Unmistakable"	3:17
5.	"Sorrow"	2:07
6.	"Vengeance Eternal"	2:31
7.	"Homeward Bound"	3:20
8.	"Fatalism"	3:11
9.	"Destination"	3:35
10.	"John and Gabrielle"	5:01
11.	"Rescue at Night"	4:25
12.	"Concussed"	3:27
13.	"Blood and Fire"	4:02
14.	"Outnumbered"	6:15
15.	"Love Unconditional"	3:12
16.	"U-Turn"	2:35
17.	"Because of You"	3:49
18.	"They Will Come Back"	2:02
19.	"We Will Find Him"	5:17
20.	"The Tunnels"	1:02
21.	"Higher Aspirations"	1:41
22.	"Preparing for War"	3:01
23.	"Sunset"	2:30

== Reception ==
Anton Smit of Soundtrack World wrote "If you do not mind a less melodic score with an amazing theme implementation, you should definitely check this one out." Filmtracks wrote "Expect the product to supply less fulfillment compared to Rambo, either of the similar "Preparing for War" or "Rambo: Last Blood" tracks representing the best new material and the rest aping the prior score or leaving you bored and disengaged. A long road, indeed." Ian Freer of Empire called it a "wall-to-wall score". Duncan Bowles of Den of Geek wrote "Brian Tyler’s superb score retains the references to Jerry Goldsmith’s original work, while interweaving Tyler’s own memorable take for the last one." Chris Bumbray of JoBlo.com wrote "composer Brian Tyler works in nods to the Jerry Goldsmith scores that remind us of the darkness still contaminating Rambo’s soul, even if at the moment he seems at peace."

== Personnel ==
Credits adapted from liner notes:

- Music composer – Brian Tyler
- Music producer – Brian Tyler, Joe Lisanti
- Musical arrangements – Chris Forsgren, John Carey, Josh Zimmerman, Kenny Woods, Sarah Trevino
- Orchestra – Slovak Radio Symphony Orchestra
- Orchestra conductor – Allan Wilson, Brian Tyler
- Orchestrations – Brad Warnaar, Dana Niu, Robert Elhai, Rossano Galante
- Score contractor – Paul Talkington
- Recording – Peter Fuchs
- Mixing – Brian Tyler, Frank Wolf
- Mastering – Patricia Sullivan
- Music editor – Kyle Clausen, Seth Glennie-Smith
- Technician – Nathan Alexander
- Score coordinator – Stephanie Bryant
- Music preparation – Janis Stonerook
- Art direction – John Bergin
- Administrative coordinator – Don Smith, Erica Pope
- Executive producer – Brian McNelis, Darren Blumenthal, Tara Finegan
- A&R director – Eric Craig
