= Sinner's Prayer (song) =

Single by Sully Erna

from the album Avalon
- Released: August 3, 2010
- Genre: Progressive rock
- Length: 4:20
- Label: Universal Republic
- Songwriter: Sully Erna
- Producer: Sully Erna

Sully Erna singles chronology
"Sinner's Prayer" (2010)	"Eyes of a Child" (2011)

Audio sample
- file; help

"Sinner's Prayer" is a song by American rock musician Sully Erna. It is the lead single from his 2010 debut album Avalon. The song was originally written for Sylvester Stallone's blockbuster The Expendables but was later taken off the film and soundtrack during post-production. However, the song was integrated into the extended Director's Cut version during the film's new opening credits sequence.

== Background ==
In 2008, after Godsmack members started working on their side-project, Another Animal, Sully Erna began work on his first solo album. With the help of singer Lisa Guyer, whom he'd previously worked with on Hollow, Sully Erna worked on the album through 2009, and "Sinner's Prayer" was chosen to become the first official single to be released from Avalon.

On September 25, Sully Erna told the Artisan News Service in a video interview that he was approached to record "Sinner's Prayer" for this year's Sylvester Stallone blockbuster "The Expendables", which will also feature Jason Statham, Jet Li, Mickey Rourke and Randy Couture.

Few months later, it was reported that the song won't make it as one of the soundtracks of that movie, with Sully Erna stating that "It’s a long story, but the short of it is, I lost the movie. Stallone decided to change out the scene that the song was married to. So since the scene went, so did the music. Very sad about that."

Despite not making it into the theatrical cut, the track eventually made its way into the extended cut, which premiered on various On Demand services in April 2011.

== Release ==
On August 3, the single made its way to radio stations in the United States.

=== Release history ===
Format	Date	Label
US Radio	August 3, 2010	Universal Republic
Digital download (US)	August 3, 2010	Universal Republic
Digital download (Worldwide)	August 3, 2010	Universal Republic

=== Digital download ===
"Sinner's Prayer" became available to download on August 3, which is the same date it is being heard on local radio stations across the country for the first time.

== Track listing ==
No.	Title	Writer(s)	Length
1.	"Sinner's Prayer"	Sully Erna	4:20
