= Avalon (Sully Erna album) =

Studio album by Sully Erna
- Released: September 14, 2010
- Studios: Serenity West Studios, Hollywood, California
- Genres: Acoustic rock; symphonic rock; tribal rock; alternative rock
- Length: 54:40
- Label: Universal Republic
- Producer: Sully Erna

Sully Erna chronology
Avalon (2010)	Hometown Life (2016)

Singles from Avalon
- 1. "Sinner's Prayer" Released: August 3, 2010; 2. "Eyes of a Child" Released: May 24, 2011

Avalon is the first solo studio album by American rock musician Sully Erna, released on September 14, 2010. Avalon is a combination of work that took Sully Erna almost seven years to complete.

== Background ==
In October 2006, Launch Radio Networks reported that Sully Erna has started working on his solo album. Although he wasn't exactly sure what shape it will take, Erna told Launch Radio Networks that "I've been putting some thought into it," he said. "I actually have some stuff that I'm doing on the side right now. I don't know when I'm gonna kind of unleash something like that, and I don't know really what it's gonna be yet. I have a couple of different ideas, and I'm not sure what and when it's gonna happen, but of course Godsmack is our lifeblood and we don't have any plans on trying to break this thing up. But, you know, we do want to venture out a little bit and just do some side stuff."

While other Godsmack members were busy with their side project, Another Animal, it was reported by The Pulse of Radio that Sully Erna has officially launched his solo tour. The tour started on May 1, 2008, and ended on August 1, 2008. During the tour, Erna performed "Eyes of a Child", and "Until Then". Both songs are not featured on any known Godsmack album or compilation.

During 2008, many people questioned the future of Godsmack, and rumors began swirling. Sully Erna put those rumors to rest, stating "The band's in great shape. We're getting along wonderfully, and there are no problems whatsoever. We all know this is an entity we can't just shut down; it's gonna continue to go, and everybody's just kinda doing something on the side that's...a little different than what we'd do from Godsmack."

In March 2009, It was reported that Sully Erna has finished recording his first solo album, entitled Avalon. According to Erna, Avalon is a combination of work that took him almost seven years to complete. Erna described Avalon as his best work to date, stating "I truly believe that this is my best work to date. I'm more proud of this record than any other music I have ever recorded."

== Sound ==
Sully Erna described the album as being "A very different kind of sounding record," and "A huge departure from anything I've ever done." When interviewed by Billboard.com, Erna described the sound of his upcoming solo album as being very Native American tribal rhythms, stating "It's gonna be very Native American tribal rhythms mixed with these Middle Eastern bluesy kind of vocals. This is a project to get a different kind of music out of me that I feel is inside me. .. and not for any expectations about how big the hit may be or if it's gonna make it on the radio."

"Sinner's Prayer"
Sample of "Sinner's Prayer". The song was originally written for this year's Sylvester Stallone blockbuster The Expendables. "Sinner's Prayer" became available to download on August 3, which is the same date it can be heard on local radio stations across the country for the first time.

In further describing the album's sound, Sully Erna posted a message on the band official forums, stating:

This is a series of beautifully arranged compositions that I have created over many years. Some compositions are newer, written with the help of my solo band mates. Others have been shelved over time waiting for the right moment to be released. That moment is finally here, and I couldn't be more proud to share it with all of you!!

Erna goes on to explain that the album was recorded with instruments such as hand drums, cellos, flutes and piano, making it very different from his signature sound with Godsmack.

This record was recorded with all hand drums, cellos, flutes, piano, etc... It is very eclectic and intellectual. It is something that you will want to put on when you're in the mood to lie on your couch, dim the lights, and light all your candles and incense. Just vibe out to this hypnotic variety of music, and enjoy the pictures that will be painted in your mind. This is a very visual record, so for sure the visuals will come. Don't be surprised if it triggers some deep emotions within you based on your own life situations. Either way, enjoy the ride, it's a beautiful one!!

The album features Lisa Guyer who had performed backing vocals for the song "Hollow" on Godsmack's previous album, classically trained cellist Irina Chirkova, and percussionist Niall Gregory of Dead Can Dance.

== Title ==
The meaning of "Avalon"
In this interview with TheAudioPrev, Sully Erna explained the meaning behind "Avalon".

According to Sully Erna, the album was named after one of the songs on the album, entitled "Avalon", because it encompasses the album as a whole, stating:

If someone asked me if there was one song that could define our sound that’s the song I’d pick. It’s just a little bit of everything – Lisa sings great on that song and it’s just one of those songs I’d reference as haunting and hypnotic. It’s all hand drumming and has beautiful melodies. It’s a journey through meditation. The song is about experiencing visions and feelings you get under meditation. I just think it’s a really beautiful song, it’s very smooth and seamless. That’s the one I’d have represent the project.

== Promotion ==
"If I could ask one simple favor of all of you, I would ask for you to please pass this music on to as many people as you can. Spread the word that there is a great new record out, and if they don't have it yet, they are missing out on a real musical experience. Request Sinner's Prayer on the radio and help me make Avalon a great success."

— Sully Erna on Avalon.

In order to promote his solo album, Sully Erna has taken a different approach to getting his new music heard, stating "What we’re doing right now is just speaking with a lot of different film companies to see what movies are coming out this year and next year and trying to attach some of the songs to that."

On September 25, Sully Erna told the Artisan News Service in a video interview that he was approached to record "Sinner's Prayer" for 2010's Sylvester Stallone film The Expendables, which will also feature Jason Statham, Jet Li, Mickey Rourke and Randy Couture. A few months later, however, Erna stated that the song won't be featured in that movie because Stallone changed the scene the song was attached to.

=== Singles ===
"Sinner's Prayer" featuring singer Lisa Guyer is the lead single from the album. Universal Records sent the song to U.S. radio on August 3, 2010. The song became available as a digital download on August 3, 2010. A music video of the song featuring Sully Erna's solo band members performing the song was released on September 15, 2010.

== Release ==
Avalon was released on September 14, 2010, through Universal Records.

== Critical reception ==
Upon its release, Avalon received generally positive reviews from music critics.

Professional ratings
Review scores
Source	Rating
Blistering	9/10 stars
AllMusic	3.5/5 stars

- James Christopher Monger of AllMusic gave the album three and a half out of five stars, and praised Erna's inventive and new musical approach, writing "...there's a lot to be said for managing to crank out such a powerful product with all of the amps turned off". He added, "That sound expands to an even greater extent on the single “Sinner’s Prayer,” bolstered by guest vocalist Lisa Guyer, Bulgarian cellist Irina Chirkova, and Dead Can Dance percussionist Niall Gregory."

== Commercial performance ==
The album debuted at number twenty-four on the US Billboard 200 chart with first-week sales of nearly 14,000 copies.

== Track listing ==
All tracks are written by Sully Erna.

Standard single disc edition
No.	Title	Length
1.	"Avalon"	4:57
2.	"7 Years"	8:41
3.	"Broken Road"	5:08
4.	"Sinner's Prayer"	4:17
5.	"My Light"	5:28
6.	"The Rise"	6:45
7.	"Until Then..."	5:10
8.	"The Departed"	5:50
9.	"Eyes of a Child"	4:40
10.	"In Through Time"	3:43

iTunes and Amazon download editions
No.	Title	Length
11.	"Cast Out (Spirit Ceremony)"	4:34

Note

- "The Departed" is an iTunes bonus track on the deluxe edition of The Oracle by Godsmack with slightly different lyrics at the end of the second verse.
- Singles are
1. Avalon
2. Broken Road
3. Sinner's Prayer
4. Until Then...
5. The Departed
6. Eyes of a Child

== Personnel ==
- Sully Erna – lead vocals, piano, acoustic guitar, producer
- Lisa Guyer – vocals
- Irina Chirkova – cello
- Niall Gregory – percussion
- Tim Theriault – guitar, backing vocals
- Chris Decato – keyboards, backing vocals
- Chris Lester – bass, acoustic guitar, mandolin, backing vocals
- David Stefanelli – drums
- Joe Clapp – engineer
- Angelo Caputo – engineer
- Steve Catizone – engineer, keyboards
- David Pier – engineer
- Andrew Murdock – mixing

== Charts ==
Chart (2010)	Peak position
US Billboard 200	24
US Billboard Rock Albums	9
US Billboard Digital Albums	21
Greek Albums Chart	65

=== Release history ===
Country	Date	Distributing label	Format	Catalog	Ref.
United Kingdom	September 13, 2010	Spinefarm	CD and music download services	B004071TIG	
United States	September 14, 2010	Universal Republic	CD and music download services	B003XQRZA6	
