= Rambo (soundtrack) =

Rambo: Original Motion Picture Soundtrack

Film score by Brian Tyler
- Released: January 22, 2008
- Recorded: 2007–2008
- Studios: Bastyr Hall, Bastyr University, Seattle, Washington
- Genre: Film score
- Length: 75:59
- Label: Lionsgate
- Producer: Brian Tyler

Brian Tyler chronology
Aliens vs. Predator: Requiem (2008)	Rambo (2008)	Bangkok Dangerous (2008)

Rambo: Original Motion Picture Soundtrack is the film score to the 2008 film Rambo, a sequel to Rambo III (1988) and the fourth installment in the Rambo film series. The film is directed by Sylvester Stallone, who also reprises his lead role as Vietnam War veteran John Rambo. The film score is composed by Brian Tyler and released through Lionsgate Records on January 22, 2008.

== Development ==
Brian Tyler composed the original score for the film. He was a fan of First Blood during his childhood, and at an IGN interview, when Tyler recalled on how coincidentally Stallone called him even before the film began production, considering it as a surreal experience adding "no words can describe how strange it was [to receive that call] as a huge fan". Stallone wanted Tyler to incorporate Jerry Goldsmith's original themes into the film to maintain continuity with this film and the rest of the franchise. Tyler then modified it with re-arrangements and newer orchestration, with the actual theme intact. He further wrote two new themes for Rambo specifically for the film, which would intertwine with Goldsmith's themes as well. Tyler wrote a strongly stated motive which was melodic in a different tone than the original theme due to the difference in this film's storyline compared to the predecessors. Tyler admitted that there were huge expectations, especially from fans of the franchise who liked Goldsmith's scores and worked very hard to make it sound the way they liked. He considered it as an homage to Goldsmith and his contributions for the franchise.

== Release ==
The soundtrack was released through Lionsgate Records in both digital and physical formats on January 22, 2009.

== Track listing ==
No.	Title	Length
1.	"Rambo Theme"	3:34
2.	"No Rules of Engagement"	7:09
3.	"Conscription"	2:55
4.	"The Rescue"	4:04
5.	"Aftermath"	2:33
6.	"Searching for Missionaries"	7:07
7.	"Haunting Mercenaries"	2:43
8.	"Crossing into Burma"	6:59
9.	"The Village"	1:43
10.	"Rambo Returns"	2:44
11.	"When You Are Pushed"	2:26
12.	"The Call to War"	2:51
13.	"Atrocities"	1:40
14.	"Prison Camp"	4:42
15.	"Attack on the Village"	3:01
16.	"Rambo Takes Charge"	2:22
17.	"The Compound"	7:48
18.	"Battle Adagio"	3:10
19.	"Rambo Main Title"	3:30
20.	"Rambo End Title"	2:58
Total length:		75:59

== Reception ==
Christopher Coleman of Tracksounds wrote "Those of you who enjoy Brian Tyler's works and those of you quasi-nostalgic over the original First Blood, this effort (the score, not the film) may have something to offer you." Thom Jurek of AllMusic described it as a "fine score" which adds some depth and surprise in it, despite Tyler's functional soundscape. He added, "There is something actually quite regal and powerful here; the notion of a score as a work in and of itself seems to have been forgotten in Hollywood, but for Goldsmith, this is obviously still true, thank goodness."

Clark Douglas of Movie Music UK admitted that the score has some merit, but "one is only reminded of just how much more satisfying the Goldsmith efforts were. Tyler's music somehow sounds too familiar, there's not much here that we haven't heard before, and it would have been much more interesting if his writing had somewhat echoed Goldsmith's rather than [Hans] Zimmer's." He recommended the album for Tyler enthusiasts, while considered it disappointing for Goldsmith's fans. Thomas Glorieux of Maintitles was critical of Tyler's inability to reinvent himself as the soundscape was too similar comparing his Eagle Eye (2008) and Darkness Falls (2003). Filmtracks wrote "this score has a variety of plusses and minuses, averaging out to be an interesting but ultimately disappointing listening experience."

== Personnel ==
Credits adapted from liner notes:

- Music composer – Brian Tyler, Jerry Goldsmith (original Rambo themes)
- Music producer, percussions and strings – Brian Tyler
- Arrangements – Jeff Toyne, Todd Haberman
- Orchestra – Northwest Sinfonia, City of Prague Philharmonic Orchestra
- Orchestra conductor – Brian Tyler, David Sabee
- Orchestra contractor – David Sabee, Simon James
- Pro-tools operator – Brian Valentino
- Staff engineer – Kory Kruckenberg
- Stage manager – Jon Schluckebier
- Recording and mixing – Brian Tyler, Joel Iwataki
- Music editors – Gary L. Krause, Joe Lisanti
- Musical assistance – Pakk Hui
- Music coordinator – Chris Fagot
- Copyist – Eric Stonerook
- Music business and legal affairs – Lenny Wohl
- Executive in charge of music and soundtracks for Lionsgate – Jay Faires
- Music librarian – Robert Puff
- Music supervisor – Ashley Miller
- Music consultant – Keith Power
- Executive producer – Ashley Miller, Sylvester Stallone

== External media ==
- A Score to Settle: The Music of Rambo (Television production). Off the Cliff Productions. 2008.
