= Law Abiding Citizen =

2009 action thriller film by F. Gary Gray

- Theatrical release poster
- Directed by: F. Gary Gray
- Written by: Kurt Wimmer
- Produced by: Lucas Foster; Gerard Butler; Alan Siegel; Mark Gill; Kurt Wimmer; Robert Katz
- Starring: Jamie Foxx; Gerard Butler; Bruce McGill; Colm Meaney; Leslie Bibb; Regina Hall; Michael Irby; Christian Stolte; Josh Stewart
- Cinematography: Jonathan Sela
- Edited by: Tariq Anwar
- Music by: Brian Tyler
- Production companies: The Film Department; Warp Films; Evil Twins
- Distributed by: Overture Films
- Release date: October 16, 2009 (United States)
- Running time: 109 minutes
- Country: United States
- Language: English
- Budget: $53 million
- Box office: $127.9 million

Law Abiding Citizen is a 2009 American vigilante action thriller film directed by F. Gary Gray and written by Kurt Wimmer. The film stars Jamie Foxx, Gerard Butler, Bruce McGill, Colm Meaney, Leslie Bibb, Regina Hall, Michael Irby, Christian Stolte, and Josh Stewart. Set in Philadelphia, it follows Clyde Shelton (Butler), a man who witnesses the rape and murder of his wife and daughter during a home invasion. Prosecutor Nick Rice (Foxx), who is unwilling to take a chance on lowering his high conviction rate due to lack of evidence, makes a plea bargain with the perpetrator, Clarence Darby (Stolte), who pleads guilty to a lesser charge in exchange for testifying against his accomplice, Rupert Ames (Stewart), and receives a reduced prison sentence. Ten years later, Shelton takes the law into his own hands and targets not only Rice, but also those whom he believes support a broken and corrupt criminal justice system.

Law Abiding Citizen was theatrically released in the United States by Overture Films on October 16, 2009, to negative reviews from critics, who praised the performances of the cast but criticized the execution of its premise. Despite this, it was a box office success, grossing $127.9 million against its $53 million production budget. The film was nominated for the Saturn Award for Best Action or Adventure Film at the 36th Saturn Awards.

== Plot ==
Clyde Shelton lives with his wife and daughter in Philadelphia when two burglars, Rupert Ames and Clarence Darby, break into their home. Ames, who only intended to steal from the Shelton family, ties up and gags Clyde, while Darby stabs him and his wife in the stomach before raping and murdering his wife and their daughter in front of him. Prosecutor Nick Rice is assigned to the case along with District Attorney Jonas Cantrell. Unwilling to risk lowering his high conviction rate due to insufficient evidence, Nick agrees to a plea bargain. Clyde begs Nick not to make a deal with Darby, but he does so anyway. Darby testifies against Ames, who is convicted of felony murder and sentenced to death, while Darby pleads guilty to third-degree murder and will serve three years in prison before being released on parole. During a press conference, Darby publicly thanks Nick and shakes his hand as Clyde watches from afar.

Ten years later, Ames expresses remorse for his role in the burglary, but maintains his innocence in the murders. He is executed via lethal injection, but the procedure goes awry, and he dies in agony. Nick and Cantrell discover that the drugs were replaced with an anticonvulsant. Meanwhile, Darby is warned by an anonymous caller of incoming police and instructed to flee his apartment and take an officer hostage. The officer is revealed to be Clyde in disguise; Darby attempts to shoot him, but is paralyzed by tetrodotoxin-laced spikes hidden in the gun's handle. Clyde records himself torturing and killing Darby as he is strapped to a table. After Darby's remains are found inside an abandoned warehouse of which Clyde is an absentee landlord, he is arrested.

During interrogation, Nick confronts Clyde for mailing a copy of Darby's murder to his daughter Denise. Clyde represents himself at his bail hearing, where Judge Laura Burch, who previously presided over Darby's plea deal, initially grants him bail. When Clyde accuses Burch of being too easily swayed by legal doctrine and willing to release a potential criminal, she holds him in contempt of court and denies his bail. After giving his confession, Clyde demands a steak lunch from Del Frisco's and his iPod be delivered to his prison cell at 1:00 p.m. in exchange for the location of Darby's lawyer, Bill Reynolds, who was reported missing by his wife three days earlier. Nick agrees to the deal, but after missing Clyde's deadline, Reynolds is found buried alive with a precisely timed oxygen device strapped to him. Simultaneously, Clyde kills his cellmate and is subsequently moved to solitary confinement.

Suspicious of his skills, Nick and Cantrell meet with a CIA contact, who reveals that Clyde previously worked for the agency and specialized in unorthodox assassinations. During a meeting, Nick and Cantrell persuade Burch to temporarily suspend Clyde's civil rights, when she is killed by an explosive device in her cellphone. When confronted, Clyde explains that the murders are about the failures of the criminal justice system. Clyde tells Nick that he will end the killings by 6:00 a.m. if he is released from prison and all charges against him are dropped, but Nick refuses.

After Clyde's deadline passes, members of Nick's team, including his assistant, Sarah Lowell, are killed in car bombings. While leaving Sarah's funeral, Cantrell is killed by a bomb disposal robot armed with automatic target recognition and an AT4. Nick prepares to resign, but Mayor April Henry instead promotes him to acting District Attorney and puts the city in lockdown. After Nick receives information from Sarah's boyfriend, Chester, via mail that Clyde owns a building near the prison, he and Detective Dunnigan discover a tunnel inside that leads to a cache of armaments, disguises, and surveillance equipment below the solitary confinement cells.

Nick realizes that Clyde intentionally sought solitary confinement, allowing him to leave the prison undetected. Clyde arrives disguised at City Hall, where Henry is holding an emergency meeting, and plants a napalm bomb in the room below the meeting. Nick and Dunnigan discover it will be activated via a cellphone call. When Clyde returns to his cell and finds Nick waiting for him, he tries to make another deal, but Nick refuses and leaves. Clyde activates the bomb but quickly discovers that it has been placed underneath his bed. He smiles and sits down, holding his daughter's handmade bracelet as it explodes. Nick, now the District Attorney, joins his wife at Denise's cello recital, having previously failed to do so.

== Cast ==
- Jamie Foxx as Nick Rice, a Philadelphia prosecutor
- Gerard Butler as Clyde Shelton, a former CIA engineer
- Bruce McGill as Jonas Cantrell, Philadelphia's District Attorney
- Colm Meaney as Detective Dunnigan, a Philadelphia homicide detective
- Leslie Bibb as Sarah Lowell, Nick's assistant
- Regina Hall as Kelly Rice, Nick's wife
- Michael Irby as Detective Garza, Dunnigan's partner
- Gregory Itzin as Warden Iger, warden of the prison where Shelton is kept
- Christian Stolte as Clarence Darby, a psychotic criminal who murders Clyde's wife and daughter
- Annie Corley as Judge Laura Burch, a Philadelphia judge
- Richard Portnow as Bill Reynolds, Darby's lawyer
- Josh Stewart as Rupert Ames, Darby's accomplice

In addition, Viola Davis appears as the Mayor of Philadelphia.

== Development ==
Gerard Butler was initially signed on to play the prosecuting attorney, while Jamie Foxx was the criminal mastermind operating from inside prison, a reversal of their roles in the final version. Frank Darabont was expected to direct the film, but he left the production due to creative differences with the producers.

== Production ==
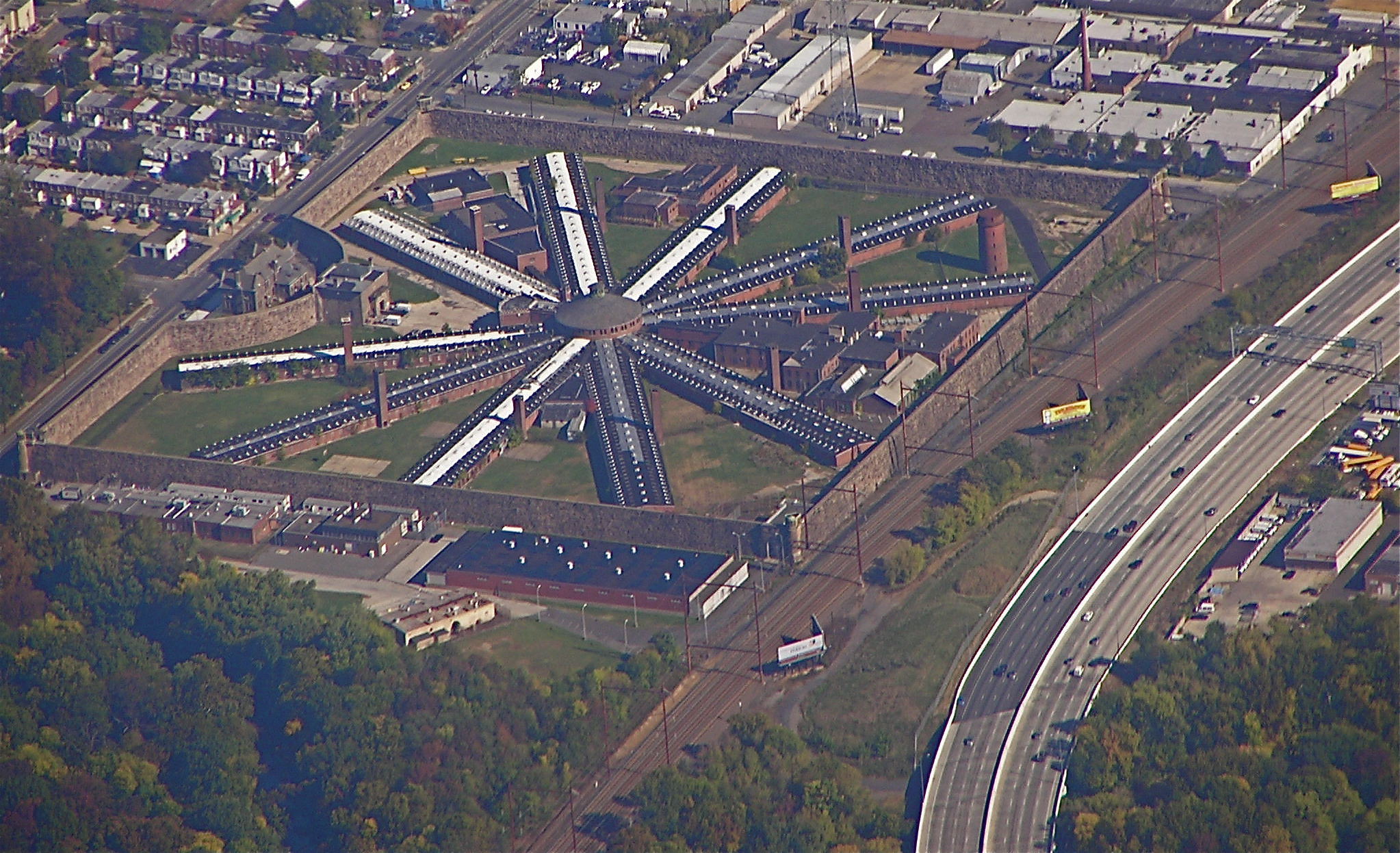
Scenes were shot at Holmesburg Prison (pictured 2007)

Filming began on January 17, 2009, and took place in and around Philadelphia. Filming locations included Philadelphia's City Hall, Laurel Hill Cemetery, and the now closed Holmesburg Prison. Holmesburg's "Thunderdome command center" is quite evident in the movie. The film was edited after being threatened with an NC-17 rating for violence, with the full version released unrated on Blu-ray.

== Soundtrack ==
The score to Law Abiding Citizen was composed by Brian Tyler, who recorded his score with a 52-piece ensemble of the Hollywood Studio Symphony at the Sony Scoring Stage with help from Kieron Charlesworth. The film also uses "Eminence Front" by The Who and "Engine No. 9" by Deftones on Clyde's iPod while he is eating his steak in his cell. While Clyde calls Darby to help him 'escape' the police after Ames' execution, "Bloodline" by Slayer is Darby's ringer. The tune at the end for closing credits is "Sin's A Good Man's Brother" by Grand Funk Railroad.

== Release ==
The film was released theatrically on October 16, 2009, in the United States. The first theatrical trailer was released on August 14, 2009, and was attached to District 9. The premiere was held on November 15, 2009, at the Cineworld complex in Glasgow, Butler's hometown. Many British tabloids labelled the event as the "Homecoming Premiere", about the Homecoming Scotland 2009 celebrations.

== Reception ==
=== Box office ===
Law Abiding Citizen grossed $73.4 million in the United States and Canada, and $54.6 million in other territories, for a worldwide total of $127.9 million. The film took second place in its opening weekend, with $21 million, behind Where the Wild Things Are. It went on to gross $126.6 million in total worldwide.

=== Critical response ===
Law Abiding Citizen received generally negative reviews from critics, with many praising its premise and central performance while criticising its execution, logic and moral stance. Review aggregator website Rotten Tomatoes reported that 26% of 162 critics gave the film a positive review, with an average rating of 4.4/10. The site's critical consensus states: "Unnecessarily violent and unflinchingly absurd, Law Abiding Citizen is plagued by subpar acting and a story that defies reason." On Metacritic, the film has a weighted average score of 34 out of 100 based on 26 critics, indicating "generally unfavourable reviews". In his review for the Chicago Sun Times, Roger Ebert said, "Law Abiding Citizen is the kind of movie you will like more at the time than in retrospect." He then went on to say, "Still, there's something to be said for a movie you like well enough at the time." Ebert rated the film three out of four stars.

== Sequel ==
In May 2022, it was announced that a standalone sequel was in development. Kurt Wimmer was hired to return to his role as screenwriter, while Gerard Butler will serve as producer alongside Alan Siegel, Lucas Foster, Rob Paris, and Mike Witherill. Foster stated in his returning role as a producer that the studios look forward to "revisit[ing] these great characters", stating that the premise "seems even more relevant today than when ... the original film" was released. The filmmaker stated: "We're going to blow your mind... again." While the plot has not been revealed, Paris and Witherill jointly stated that the creatives involved, see the movie as a "franchise opportunit[y]". The project will be a joint-venture production between G-Base Productions, Rivulet Films, Warp Films, and Village Roadshow Pictures. By June 2025, talks of the sequel had gone quiet. When asked about it during the press tour for How to Train Your Dragon, Butler replied: "I don't know. I don't know what's happening. It's a shame because I'm very proud of that movie. It's so good."

== See also ==
- 1995 Okinawa rape incident
- 2007 Cheshire, Connecticut murders
- Vigilante film
- List of films featuring home invasions
