= Xaxus III: Fire and Brimstone =

Xaxus III: Fire and Brimstone is a 1988 role-playing game supplement published by Stellar Games for Expendables.

== Contents ==
Xaxus III: Fire and Brimstone is a supplement in which a scenario and campaign setting are designed for player characters of team levels E-3 to E-5. The characters are tasked with investigating the strange and dangerous planet, which is thoroughly described, including detailed tables for introducing natural disasters.

== Publication history ==
Xaxus III: Fire and Brimstone was written by L. Lee Cerny and Walter H. Mytczynskyj and published by Stellar Games in 1988 as a 24-page book.

== Reviews ==
- Challenge #42
