= Walter H. Tyler =

American art director (1909–1990)

- Born: March 28, 1909; Los Angeles, California, U.S.
- Died: November 3, 1990 (aged 81); Orange County, California, U.S.
- Occupation: Art director
- Years active: 1944–1974
- Relatives: Brian Tyler (grandson)

Walter H. Tyler (March 28, 1909 – November 3, 1990) was an American art director. He won an Academy Award and was nominated for eight more in the category Best Art Direction. He was born in Los Angeles, California and died in Orange County, California. His grandson is film composer Brian Tyler.

== Selected filmography ==
Tyler won an Academy Award for Best Art Direction and was nominated for eight more:

Won

- Samson and Delilah (1949)

Nominated

- Kitty (1945)
- Roman Holiday (1953)
- Sabrina (1954)
- The Ten Commandments (1956)
- Career (1959)
- Visit to a Small Planet (1960)
- Summer and Smoke (1961)
- The Island at the Top of the World (1974)
