= Law Abiding Citizen (soundtrack) =

Soundtrack album by Brian Tyler
- Released: October 13, 2009
- Recorded: Sony Scoring Stage, Los Angeles, California
- Genre: Film score
- Length: 55:06
- Label: Downtown Music LLC
- Producer: Brian Tyler

Law Abiding Citizen is the soundtrack to the film of the same name by F. Gary Gray. The score was composed by Brian Tyler. It was released on Downtown Soundtracks, a division of Downtown Music LLC, on October 13, 2009.

The score features a 52-piece ensemble of the Hollywood Studio Symphony.

== Track listing ==
All music is composed by Brian Tyler.

No.	Title	Length
1.	"Designs"	2:55
2.	"Predestined"	2:49
3.	"Mechanical Mind"	3:43
4.	"Origins"	2:29
5.	"Methodology"	2:53
6.	"Rationalization"	2:04
7.	"Shadow of a Doubt"	2:15
8.	"The Catalyst"	2:59
9.	"Breaking and Entering"	2:27
10.	"A Fresh Start"	2:10
11.	"Solitary"	2:54
12.	"The Execution"	3:16
13.	"They Can't Feel Anything"	2:29
14.	"Ultimatum"	2:48
15.	"Stalked"	2:16
16.	"Unconfession"	6:20
17.	"Guardian Angel"	3:59
18.	"Law Abiding Citizen"	4:10
Total length:		55:06
