= Hometown Life =

Studio album by Sully Erna
- Released: September 30, 2016
- Recorded: 2015
- Genre: Alternative rock
- Length: 43:31
- Label: BMG
- Producer: Sully Erna

Sully Erna chronology
Avalon (2010)	Hometown Life (2016)

Professional ratings
Review scores
Source	Rating
AllMusic	3.5/5 stars

Hometown Life is the second solo studio album by American rock musician Sully Erna, released on September 30, 2016.

== Track listing ==
All tracks are written by Sully Erna, except where noted

No.	Title	Writer(s)	Length
1.	"Hometown Life"		4:41
2.	"Your Own Drum"	Sully Erna, Zac Maloy	3:02
3.	"Different Kind of Tears"	Erna, Maloy	4:37
4.	"Take All of Me"		4:05
5.	"Don't Comfort Me"		4:10
6.	"Turn It Up!"		4:55
7.	"Blue Skies"		4:47
8.	"Forever My Infinity"		4:20
9.	"Father of Time"		4:30
10.	"Falling to Black"		3:44
Total length:			43:31

Hometown Sessions

1. Unforgettable
2. TSF

== Personnel ==
- Sully Erna – lead vocals, piano, acoustic guitar, producer
- Tim Theriault – guitar, backing vocals
- Chris Decato – keyboards, backing vocals
- Chris Lester – bass, acoustic guitar, backing vocals
- David Stefanelli – drums
- Irina Chirkova – cello
- Lisa Guyer – vocals
- Sal Erna, Matt Langley, Zach Lange, Kendall Moore – horns on "Turn it Up!"

== Charts ==
Chart (2016)	Peak position
US Billboard 200	105
