= Battle: Los Angeles (soundtrack) =

Battle: Los Angeles (Original Motion Picture Soundtrack)

Soundtrack album by Brian Tyler
- Released: March 8, 2011
- Genre: Film score
- Length: 78:19
- Label: Varèse Sarabande
- Producer: Brian Tyler

Brian Tyler chronology
Middle Men (2010)	Battle: Los Angeles (Original Motion Picture Soundtrack) (2011)	Fast Five (2011)

Battle: Los Angeles (Original Motion Picture Soundtrack) is the soundtrack to the 2011 film of the same name directed by Jonathan Liebesman. The film score is composed and conducted by Brian Tyler and performed by the Hollywood Studio Symphony. The album was released on March 8, 2011 by Varèse Sarabande featuring 22 tracks from the score.

== Track listing ==
All music is composed by Brian Tyler.

No.	Title	Length
1.	"Battle Los Angeles Hymn"	2:32
2.	"Battle Los Angeles Main Titles"	4:18
3.	"Arrival"	2:13
4.	"Marines Don’t Quit"	2:48
5.	"Command and Control Center"	3:44
6.	"Elegy"	4:59
7.	"Redemption"	8:27
8.	"For Home, Country, and Family"	4:02
9.	"War Hymn"	2:28
10.	"Evac"	3:12
11.	"To Hell and Back"	6:26
12.	"Mobilized"	5:07
13.	"The Freeway"	1:56
14.	"The Drone"	3:07
15.	"Casualty of War"	1:37
16.	"Rebalance"	1:26
17.	"Regret"	1:28
18.	"Shelf Life"	2:32
19.	"The World Is at War"	1:40
20.	"Abandoning Los Angeles"	5:11
21.	"Battle Los Angeles"	5:28
22.	"We Are Still Here"	3:15

Composed and conducted by Brian Tyler. Performed by the Hollywood Studio Symphony. Brian Tyler performed on guitars, percussion, bass, piano and electric cello.

== Critical reception ==
Professional ratings
Review scores
Source	Rating
Allmusic	3.5/5 stars
Filmtracks.com	3/5 stars

James Christopher Monger of Allmusic gave the soundtrack a review:

About as subtle as a Jerry Bruckheimer action sequence, composer Brian Tyler's score for the Aliens vs. Marines pre-summer blockbuster Battle: Los Angeles successfully walks the line between fist-pumping popcorn romp bombast and painfully serious military melodrama. Tyler, who has honed his craft on similarly themed flicks like Constantine, Aliens vs. Predator: Requiem, and Sylvester Stallone's 2008 Rambo reboot, treats the subject matter like dogma, resulting in a highly entertaining, old-fashioned orchestral soundtrack that should appeal to fans of Hans Zimmer, John Powell, and Harry Gregson-Williams.

== Personnel ==
Instrumentalists

- Percussion – Alan Estes, Robert Zimmitti, Donald Williams, Gregory Goodall
- Piano – Gloria Cheng
- Trombone – Andrew Thomas Malloy, William Reichenbach*, George Thatcher, William Booth
- Trumpet – Rick Baptist, Malcolm McNab
- Tuba – Doug Tornquist
- Viola – Andrew Duckles, David Walther, Denyse Buffum, Jennie Hansen, Matthew Funes*, Michael Nowak, Robert Brophy, Samuel Formicola, Shawn Mann, Steven Gordon, Victoria Miskolczy, Brian Dembow
- Violin – Alyssa Park, Bruce Dukov, Darius Campo, Eun-Mee Ahn, Irina Voloshina, Jay Rosen, Jeanne Skrocki, Katia Popov, Kenneth Yerke, Kevin Connolly, Marc Sazer, Michael Markman, Natalie Leggett, Phillip Levy, Rafael Rishik, Richard Altenbach, Roberto Cani, Roger Wilkie, Sarah Thornblade, Serena McKinney, Simeon Simeonov, Tamara Hatwan, Tereza Stanislav, Julie Ann Gigante
