= Teenage Mutant Ninja Turtles: The Score =

Soundtrack album by Brian Tyler
- Released: August 5, 2014
- Recorded: 2014
- Studios: Eastwood Scoring Stage, Warner Bros. Studio
- Genre: Film score
- Label: Atlantic Records
- Producer: Brian Tyler

Brian Tyler film scores chronology
Thor: The Dark World (2013)	Teenage Mutant Ninja Turtles: The Score (2014)	The Expendables 3 (2014)

Teenage Mutant Ninja Turtles: The Score is the soundtrack album to the 2014 film Teenage Mutant Ninja Turtles, which is a reboot of the Turtles film series. The album features the original score composed by Brian Tyler and was released by Atlantic Records on August 5, 2014.

== Background ==
In June 2013, it was reported that Brian Tyler had been hired to compose the score for the film. Tyler aimed to capture a fun and adventurous tone with the score. He described the main theme for the Turtles as being three separate themes in one. The first theme was made to make the listener feel like they were hearing the origin story of the characters. The second is more adventurous and was influenced by Saturday morning serials, as well as the scores of Star Wars (1977), Raiders of the Lost Ark (1981), Back to the Future (1985), and Superman (1978).

Tyler incorporated some Asian instruments, such as taiko drums and bansuris, into the score, particularly for the villain Shredder. Despite likening the score to an "insane theme park", Tyler also sought for it to make the audience "feel grounded by a theme even as the camera is swooping around". The soundtrack was released by Atlantic Records on August 5, 2014. A single to promote the film and separate from the album, "Shell Shocked" by musicians Juicy J, Wiz Khalifa, and Ty Dolla $ign and featuring Kill the Noise and Madsonik, was released on July 22, 2014.

== Reception ==
Jonathan Broxton of Movie Music UK referred to the score as one of the most enjoyable of 2014. He praised the Turtles main theme, the pieces accompanying action scenes, and the incorporation of Asian instruments, though he criticized it for a lack of subtlety. Christian Clemmensen of Filmtracks gave the score a 3 out of 5 star rating and commended it for its use of character themes, but criticized it for a lack of subtlety and compared it unfavorably to Klaus Badelt's work in TMNT (2007). James Southall of Movie Wave gave the score a 4 out of 5 star rating and said, "2014 has been a particularly strong film music year so far, with a number of very strong scores in the big blockbusters. Teenage Mutant Ninja Turtles is another – bright, colourful, consistently entertaining, it's just a blast from start to finish with the 73-minute album breezing past in no time."

== Track listing ==
All music is composed by Brian Tyler.

Teenage Mutant Ninja Turtles: The Score track listing
No.	Title	Length
1.	"Teenage Mutant Ninja Turtles"	4:45
2.	"Adolescent Genetically Altered Shinobi Terrapins"	4:31
3.	"Splinter vs. Shredder"	6:25
4.	"Origins"	6:02
5.	"Brotherhood"	1:19
6.	"Turtles United"	4:10
7.	"Rise of the Four"	3:34
8.	"The Foot Clan"	3:17
9.	"Shellacked"	6:47
10.	"Project Renaissance"	1:57
11.	"Shortcut"	4:41
12.	"Shredder"	5:59
13.	"Cowabunga"	4:35
14.	"99 Cheese Pizza"	1:49
15.	"Adrenaline"	6:26
16.	"Buck Buck"	4:11
17.	"TMNT March"	2:07
