= Lisa Guyer =

American singer

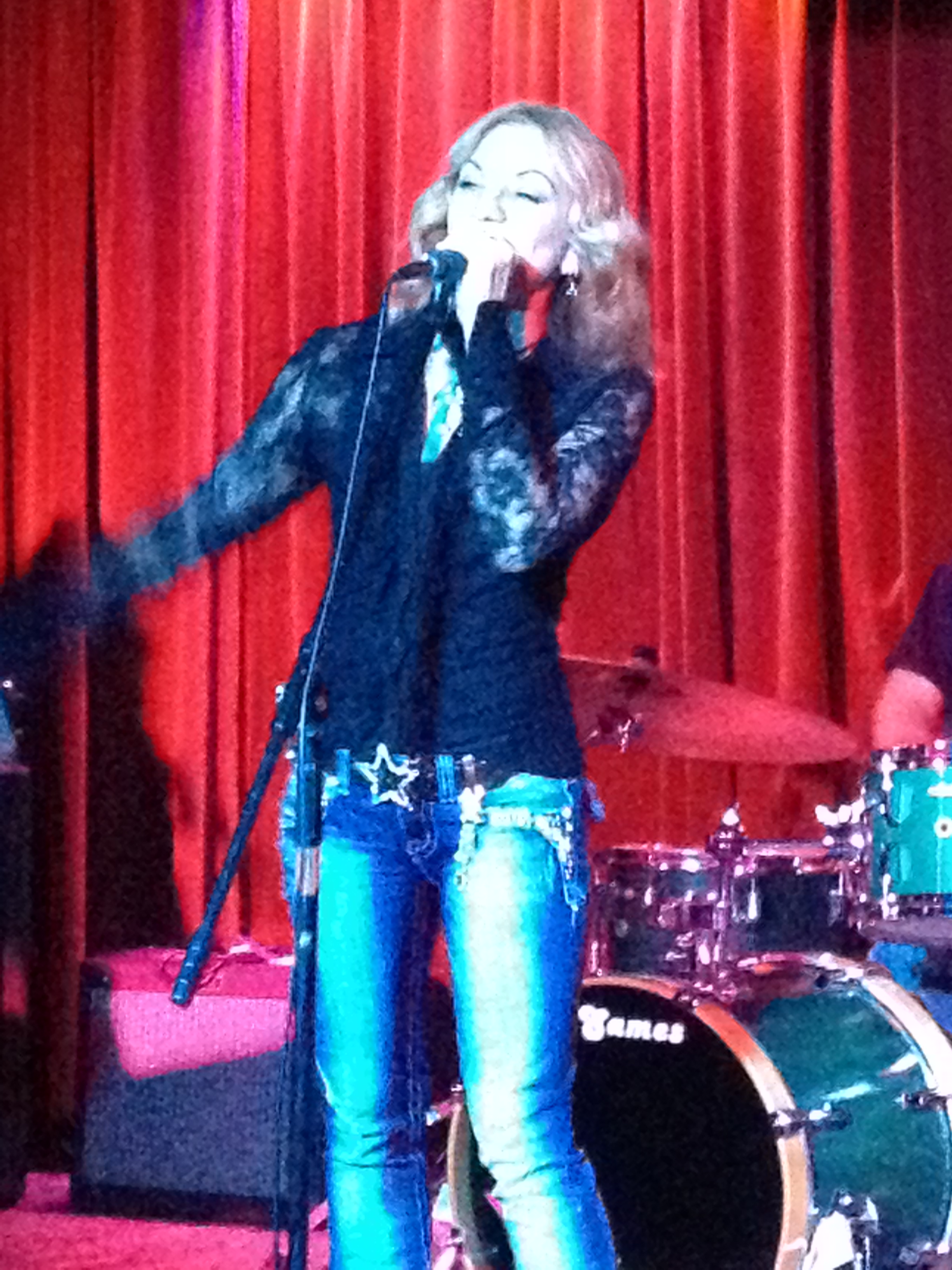
- Guyer in concert in 2014

Background information
- Born: October 25, 1963 (age 62); United States
- Genres: Rock, blues
- Occupations: Singer, musician, songwriter
- Instrument: Guitar
- Years active: 1971–present

Lisa Guyer (born October 25, 1963) is an American singer, guitarist, and songwriter.

== Early life ==
She was born into a musical family that put on shows in their community, and Guyer learned to sing and dance by age four.

== Career ==
Guyer's vocal skills are completely self-taught. Godsmack's Sully Erna describes Guyer as having "a phenomenal voice and a four-octave range". As of 2016 Guyer was an associate professor at Berklee College of Music in Boston.

== Discography ==
With The Lisa Guyer Band

- Gypsy Girl (1997)
- Leap of Faith (2000)

With Sully Erna

- Avalon (2010)
- Avalon Live (2010)
- Hometown Life (2016)

== Filmography ==
- Sully Erna Presents: The Journey to Avalon (2011)
- Sully Erna: Avalon Live (2012)
