= Expendables (role-playing game) =

1987 science fiction role-playing game

Cover art by Pamela Shanteau

Expendables is a science fiction role-playing game published by Stellar Games in 1987 in which the players take on the roles of interstellar explorers

== Description ==
The setting of Expendables is the far future, when a mysterious corporation called the Company sends employees to new planets to assess the planets for possible economic exploitation. It is dangerous work, but the Company considers the explorers to be, in the words of critic Rick Swan, "disposable resources", hence the title Expendables.

The rules cover character creation, skills, combat, equipment, vehicles, the interstellar background, information for the GM, and planet and creature generation.

In addition to the usual attributes of Strength, Dexterity, Brains, Charisma, Fitness and Luck, player characters might also have Psionics. Once attributes have been calculated, players then choose one of six careers for their character, which defines which skills they have.

The game comes with an introductory scenario, "Xaxus III", in which the players have to deal with a planet's hostile environment as they survey it for minerals.

== Publication history ==
Expendables was designed by L. Lee Cerny, Walter H. Mytczynskyj, and Michael A. Thomas, and published by Stellar Games in 1987 as an 88-page book with cover art by Pamela Shanteau and interior art by Cline Siegenthaler.

== Reception ==
Stewart Wieck reviewed the product in a 1988 issue of White Wolf. He rated it 5 points of 10 for Appearance and Complexity, 7 points for Contents, and 8 points for Playability. He rated it overall at 6 points of 10. He stated that "for $10.00 you cannot go wrong".

In Issue 42 of Challenge, Julia Martin was not impressed, commenting, "As a game system, Expendables seems competent, but is no gem. The main problem I have with it (poor cover art aside) lies with the premise of the game. It seems to have been intended as sort of a Dirty Dozen in space, which, I suppose, might have a certain appeal to some." Martin also noted the lack of creativity in the types of adventures, pointing out, "the only type of mission presented — and the type which seems to be the core scenario of the system — is the 'land on a planet, scout it, discover ancient alien artifacts, and deal with them' scenario." Martin concluded, "In a nutshell, I would pass this game by. There are other systems with many elements to recommend them and a lot more originality."

Although Rick Swan, in his 1990 book The Complete Guide to Role-Playing Games, found fault with some aspects of character creation, he thought that "the game plays well, and all of the mechanics are clearly explained and illustrated with plenty of examples" including a combat system that was "simple, quick and clean." However, Swan felt that "the game neglects to address its premise ... rules for planet creation are ambiguous and, at less than two pages, far too skimpy. The creature-generation system produces boring monsters, and the introductory scenario is dull and difficult to understand." Swan concluded by giving the game a rating of 2.5 out of 4, saying, "Without sample planets, monster and encounters, it's tough to figure out exactly how Expandables is supposed to work."

In his 1991 book Heroic Worlds, Lawrence Schick noted that "Expendables is perhaps the only RPG with a specific skill listing for proctology."
