= The Expendables Go to Hell =

Comic book based on the action movie franchise of the same name

- Variant cover for The Expendables Go to Hell, with artwork by Graham Nolan.

Publication information
- Publisher: Splatto Comics
- Genre: Action; Dark fantasy
- Publication date: 2021
- Main character(s): Barney Ross; Lee Christmas; Gunner Jensen; Yin Yang; Toll Road

Creative team
- Created by: Sylvester Stallone
- Written by: Chuck Dixon; Richard C. Meyer
- Artist(s): Graham Nolan; Jason Johnson; Kelsey Shannon; Butch Guice
- Letterer: Carlos M. Mangual
- Colorist: Daniel Brown

The Expendables Go to Hell is a 2021 action/dark fantasy comic book based on the action movie franchise of the same name.

== Summary ==
The Expendables are killed in action, and awaken in Hell itself, which is caught in an eternal war. The story features an eclectic mix of different character archetypes involved in the war itself, such as demons, samurai, Romans, war elephants, monsters, Norse Valkyries, Nazis, dragons, and knights. They also meet various historical figures, such as Audie Murphy. Their overall goal is to win this war, and fight their way out of Hell.

There are three "side quests" in the story, where characters branch off the team in a subplot that is interwoven with the main story itself: "The Bridge" (where Barney Ross finds his still living friend Tool trapped in Hell), "Christmas In Hell" (where Lee Christmas is lured away from the team at a time where he's needed the most), and "Barbarian's Holiday" (where Gunner Jensen "makes the most of a bad situation").

== Development ==
Dynamite Entertainment, which previously held the comic rights to The Expendables, had let their license expire at an unknown date. Afterwards, Chuck Dixon and Richard C. Meyer made deals directly with Sylvester Stallone to get the rights to adapt the movie into a comic book. Meyer, known online as Comics MATTER w/Ya Boi Zack, had announced this as a secret project in July 2019 on his YouTube channel. In February 2020, The Expendables Go to Hell was officially unveiled. The comic was crowdfunded on Indiegogo, raising over $275,000 in total, and released in 2021 under Meyer's Splatto Comics imprint.

Early reports have also stated this will be published under a new indie label called Destination Comics, created to be a professional label for Meyer's Splatto, other indie creators and licensed comic books such as those featuring Stallone.

== Team ==
The concept and general story arc was conceptualized by Sylvester Stallone, while Chuck Dixon and Richard C. Meyer co-wrote and developed the comic itself. The main storyline is drawn by Graham Nolan, with the side quests drawn by Jason Johnson ("The Bridge"), Kelsey Shannon ("Christmas in Hell") and Butch Guice ("Barbarian's Holiday"). The main cover was designed by Shannon, and with unique variant covers by Billy Tucci, Meyer, Johnson, Renzo Rodriguez and Dave Dorman.
