= The Expendables (franchise) =

2010s action film series by Sylvester Stallone

- Official franchise logo
- Created by: David Callaham
- Original work: The Expendables (2010)
- Owner: Lionsgate
- Years: 2010–present

Print publications
- Comics: The Expendables (2010); The Expendables Go to Hell (2021)

Films and television
- Films: The Expendables (2010); The Expendables 2 (2012); The Expendables 3 (2014); Expend4bles (2023)

Games
- Video games: The Expendables 8-bit (2010); The Expendables 2 Videogame (2012); The Expendables 2: Deploy and Destroy (2012); The Expendables III: Deploy & Destroy Reloaded (2014); The Expendabros (2015)

Audio
- Soundtracks: The Expendables; The Expendables 2; The Expendables 3; Expend4bles

The Expendables is an American ensemble action thriller franchise conceived by David Callaham, spanning a film series, the first three movies were cowritten by Sylvester Stallone, and additional media. The films star an ensemble cast, including Stallone and Jason Statham, and are produced by Avi Lerner and Kevin King-Templeton. The film series, an acknowledgement of former blockbuster action films made in the 1980s and 1990s, also pays homage to action stars of former decades, and the more recent stars in action. The series consists of the films The Expendables (2010), The Expendables 2 (2012), The Expendables 3 (2014), Expend4bles (2023), and the addition of the comic series The Expendables Go to Hell (2021). Though criticism with regard to plot and dialogue between characters has been expressed, critics praised the use of comic relief in between action.

== Films ==
Film	U.S. release date	Director	Screenwriters	Story by	Producers
The Expendables	August 13, 2010	Sylvester Stallone	David Callaham & Sylvester Stallone	David Callaham	Avi Lerner, John Thompson & Kevin King-Templeton
The Expendables 2	August 17, 2012	Simon West	Richard Wenk & Sylvester Stallone	Ken Kaufman, David Agosto & Richard Wenk	Avi Lerner, Les Weldon, Danny Lerner & Kevin King-Templeton
The Expendables 3	August 15, 2014	Patrick Hughes	Katrin Benedikt, Sylvester Stallone & Creighton Rothenberger	Sylvester Stallone	Avi Lerner, Les Weldon, Danny Lerner, John Thompson & Kevin King-Templeton
Expend4bles	September 22, 2023	Scott Waugh	Max Adams, Kurt Wimmer & Tad Daggerhart	Kurt Wimmer, Spenser Cohen & Tad Daggerhart	Les Weldon, Yariv Lerner, Jason Statham & Kevin King-Templeton

=== The Expendables (2010) ===
The Expendables, a group of elite mercenaries who carry out all sorts of missions, ranging from assassination to rescue, are deployed to a South American island, Vilena, to overthrow a Latin American dictator, General Garza, who is interfering with the plans of a group of "people" led by a man known only as Mr. Church. However, the team leader, Barney Ross, soon realizes that Garza is merely a puppet being controlled by a ruthless rogue CIA officer, James Monroe, who is Mr. Church's real target.

=== The Expendables 2 (2012) ===
A while after the first film, the Expendables accept another mission from Mr. Church to make up for losses caused by the mission in Vilena, but they end up in a conflict with a rival mercenary group, the Sangs, and their newest and youngest member is murdered by their leader, Jean Vilain. Ross swears vengeance on Vilain for his protegé's death and starts to track him down, in the process learning that Vilain threatens the world with five tons of weapons grade plutonium he intends to excavate from an abandoned Soviet mine and sell to the highest bidder.

=== The Expendables 3 (2014) ===
The Expendables come face to face with the team's co-founder Conrad Stonebanks. Ross was forced to kill Stonebanks after he became a ruthless arms trader, but Stonebanks survived and has now made it his mission to destroy The Expendables. Ross resorts to recruiting a new and younger generation of Expendables to help the team overcome his old adversary.

=== Expend4bles (2023) ===
The Expendables are assigned a mission to thwart the plans of terrorist groups led by Suarto Rahmat and Ocelot as they possesses nuclear weapons with plans to provoke World War III in order to receive profits from igniting the war.

=== Future ===
In October 2012, plans for an all-female centered film were announced titled, The Expendabelles. Karen McCullah and Kirsten Smith were hired to co-write the script, while Avi Lerner, Mark Gill, Julie Kroll, Boaz Davidson, and Kevin King will serve as producers. The film was intended to be a joint production between Millennium Films, Eclectic Pictures, and Summertime Entertainment. Stallone is not involved with the project. By the following month, Lerner had entered early negotiations with actresses Meryl Streep, Cameron Diaz and Milla Jovovich to feature as the stars of the film. The producer stated that they were looking for a female director for the project, while also stating that principal photography was scheduled to take place in Bulgaria, where previous installments had been filmed.

By February 2014, it was announced that Robert Luketic had been hired as director. Stallone reiterated that he is not involved with the spin-off, but that he would like to see Sigourney Weaver appear in the movie. By August, Lerner stated that the script was nearing its final draft. Later that month, the studio released an updated official synopsis for the film as: "The Expendables universe has a new team. An elite group of highly trained female mercenaries are brought together for a covert hostage rescue mission. Once they are behind enemy lines, the women discover that they will also need to topple an evil dictator bent on world domination. It becomes clear there is no such thing as the right man for the job. The ExpendaBelles is the ultimate story of female empowerment and kick-ass teamwork." All studios involved had intended to begin production early-2015. In November 2022, President of Millennium Films, Jeffrey Greenstein stated that the project had been shelved, explaining that the project had gone through various iterations of a script trying to "explain" why a team of only females was the center of the plot. The creatives have opted to instead integrate more female characters into the other films of franchise.

In May 2026, the project re-entered development, with Heidi Jo Markel and Glenn Gainor as producers. Reworked from the previous iteration conceptualized by Markel, Patrick Muldoon, and Julie Kroll; the plot will take place in the 1990s during the Y2K-era tension as an original story for a team of elite female operatives. The script is intended to expand the continuity of the franchise, as creatives stated that it can also be seen as a standalone installment. The producers were assembling the writers and directors at that time. The project will be a joint-venture production in collaboration with franchise owner Lionsgate Films, by Eclectic Pictures, Hollywood Ventures Group, and Thirteenth Studios.

== Television ==
In May 2012, it was announced that a television spin-off of the film series had entered development at Lionsgate. In March 2015, it was confirmed that the franchise would expand, with a television event series in active development. The project would be a joint-production between CBS Television Studios, Lionsgate Television, Shane Brennan Prods., and Rogue Marble Productions. Shane Brennan has signed on as creator, producer and showrunner; as well as serving as co-writer with Greg Coolidge and Kirk Ward. Stallone would serve as executive producer alongside Avi Lerner, Kevin King, Grant Anderson, and Brennan. The plot of the series was announced to feature a new team of Expendables, composed of 'iconic television stars', who are on a mission to stop the dangerous activities of terrorist organizations.

Originally scheduled to air on Fox network, beginning in June 2016 the series was being shopped around to other networks and streaming services. In November 2021, President of Millennium Films Jeffrey Greenstein confirmed that the studio is once again actively developing a television series for the franchise. In November 2022, Greenstein reiterated that development for a television series is ongoing, with plans to expand each of the studio's franchises into additional media.

== Main cast and characters ==
Character	Films			
Character	The Expendables	The Expendables 2	The Expendables 3	Expend4bles
Character	2010	2012	2014	2023
Barney Ross	Sylvester Stallone	Sylvester Stallone	Sylvester Stallone	Sylvester Stallone
Lee Christmas	Jason Statham	Jason Statham	Jason Statham	Jason Statham
Gunner Jensen	Dolph Lundgren	Dolph Lundgren	Dolph Lundgren	Dolph Lundgren
Toll Road	Randy Couture	Randy Couture	Randy Couture	Randy Couture
Yin Yang	Jet Li	Jet Li	Jet Li	
Hale Caesar	Terry Crews	Terry Crews	Terry Crews	
Trent "Trench" Mauser	Arnold Schwarzenegger	Arnold Schwarzenegger	Arnold Schwarzenegger	
Lacy	Charisma Carpenter	Charisma Carpenter		
Agent Church	Bruce Willis	Bruce Willis		
Tool	Mickey Rourke			
Sandra Garza	Giselle Itié			
Agent James Munroe	Eric Roberts			
Lawrence "The Brit" Sparks	Gary Daniels			
Daniel "Dan" Paine	Steve Austin			
Booker "The Lone Wolf"		Chuck Norris		
Billy "The Kid" Timmons		Liam Hemsworth		
Agent Maggie Chan		Yu Nan		
Hector		Scott Adkins		
Jean Vilain		Jean-Claude Van Damme		
Conrad Stonebanks			Mel Gibson	
Agent Max Drummer			Harrison Ford	
Bonaparte			Kelsey Grammer	
Galgo			Antonio Banderas	
Doctor "Doc" Death			Wesley Snipes	
John Smilee			Kellan Lutz	
Luna Maya			Ronda Rousey	
Thorn			Glen Powell	
Mars			Victor Ortiz	
Goran Vata			Robert Davi	
Easy Day				Curtis "50 Cent" Jackson III
Agent Gina				Megan Fox
Decha Unai				Tony Jaa
Galan				Jacob Scipio
Lash				Levy Tran
Suarto Rahmat				Iko Uwais
Agent Marsh / Ocelot				Andy García

== Additional crew and production details ==
Film	Crew/Detail					
Film	Composer	Cinematographer	Editor(s)	Production companies	Distributing company	Running time
The Expendables	Brian Tyler	Jeffrey Kimball	Paul Harb; Ken Blackwell	Nu Image, Nimar Studios, Millennium Films, Wide Picture Studios, Splendid Film Studios, Rogue Marble Productions, Nu Image Entertainment GmbH	Lionsgate	103 min
The Expendables 2	Brian Tyler	Shelly Johnson	Todd E. Miller	Lionsgate, Millennium Films, Le Vision Pictures, Nu Image Productions, Splendid Film Studios	Lionsgate	103 min
The Expendables 3	Brian Tyler	Peter Menzies Jr.	Paul Harb; Sean Albertson	Lionsgate, Davis Films, Ex3 Productions, Millennium Films, Nu Image Productions, Nu Boyana Film Studios	Lionsgate	126 min
Expend4bles	Guillaume Roussel	Tim Maurice-Jones	Michael J. Duthie	Lionsgate, Grobman Films, Templeton Media, Millennium Films, Nu Boyana Studios, Media Capital Technologies	Lionsgate	103 min
The Expendabelles	TBA	TBA	TBA	Lionsgate Films, Eclectic Pictures, Hollywood Ventures Group, Thirteen Studios	Lionsgate	TBA

== Reception ==
=== Box office performance ===
Film	Release date	Box office gross			Budget	Ref.
Film	Release date	North America	Other territories	Worldwide	Budget	Ref.
The Expendables	August 13, 2010	$103,068,524	$171,401,870	$274,470,394	$80–82 million	
The Expendables 2	August 17, 2012	$85,028,192	$229,947,763	$314,975,955	$100 million	
The Expendables 3	August 15, 2014	$39,322,544	$175,335,033	$214,657,577	$90–100 million	
Expend4bles	September 22, 2023	$16,710,153	$34,423,450	$51,133,603	$100 million	
Total		$244,129,413	$611,108,116	$855,237,529	$370–382 million	

=== Critical and public response ===
Film	Rotten Tomatoes	Metacritic	CinemaScore
The Expendables	41% (206 reviews)	45 (35 reviews)	B+
The Expendables 2	68% (133 reviews)	51 (28 reviews)	A−
The Expendables 3	32% (172 reviews)	35 (36 reviews)	A−
Expend4bles	14% (123 reviews)	30 (33 reviews)	B−

The Expendables received mixed reviews from critics. On review aggregator Rotten Tomatoes the film has a 41% approval rating based on reviews from 206 critics, with an average rating of 5.3/10. The website's consensus states: "It makes good on the old-school action it promises, but given all the talent on display, The Expendables should hit harder." On Metacritic, which assigns a normalized rating out of 100 to reviews from critics, the film has received a mean score of 45, based on 35 reviews. Audiences polled by CinemaScore gave it an average grade of B+.

The Expendables 2 received mixed reviews from critics. On Rotten Tomatoes the film has a 68% approval rating from 133 critics, with an average rating of 5.9/10. The website's consensus states: "Taut, violent, and suitably self-deprecating, The Expendables 2 gives classic action fans everything they can reasonably expect from a star-studded shoot-'em-up — for better and for worse." Metacritic gave it a score of 51 out of 100, based on reviews from 28 critics, indicating "mixed or average" reviews. CinemaScore polls reported that moviegoers gave the film an average grade of A− on an A+ to F scale.

The Expendables 3 received negative reviews from critics. On Rotten Tomatoes, the film holds a 32% rating based on 172 reviews with an average rating of 4.9/10. The site's consensus reads: "Like its predecessors, The Expendables 3 offers a modicum of all-star thrills for old-school action thriller aficionados — but given all the talent assembled, it should have been a lot more fun". On Metacritic, the film has a score of 35 out of 100 based on reviews from 35 critics.

Expend4bles was panned by critics, with much criticism aimed at its lackluster CGI. On the review aggregator website Rotten Tomatoes, 14% of 123 critics' reviews are positive, with an average rating of 3.5/10. The website's consensus reads: "Solid work from Jason Statham and some halfway decent set pieces aren't enough to make up for Expend4bles' lackluster action and cheap-looking effects." Metacritic, which uses a weighted average, assigned the film a score of 30 out of 100, based on 33 critics, indicating "generally unfavorable" reviews. Audiences surveyed by CinemaScore gave the film an average grade of "B−" on an A+ to F scale.

== Music ==
Title	U.S. release date	Length	Composer	Label
The Expendables: Original Motion Picture Soundtrack	August 10, 2010	71:41	Brian Tyler	Lionsgate
The Expendables 2: Original Motion Picture Soundtrack	August 14, 2012	56:49	Brian Tyler	Lionsgate
The Expendables 3: Original Motion Picture Soundtrack	August 12, 2014	60:09	Brian Tyler	La-La Land Records
Expend4bles (Original Motion Picture Soundtrack)	September 22, 2023	26:22	Guillaume Roussel	Millennium Media Records

== Other media ==
=== Comic books ===
- The Expendables: A miniseries based on and serving as a prequel to the titular film, written by Chuck Dixon and published by Dynamite Entertainment in 2010. The comic series featured artwork by Esteve Polls.
- The Expendables Go to Hell: Conceptualized during the writing of the second film, the series was written by Chuck Dixon, from the original story co-written by Sylvester Stallone and Dixon. Based on a concept that Stallone had written for a movie he knew would never be produced, together with writing contributions from Richard C. Meyer, the series centers around the supernatural war that the titular mercenaries face after being killed and their adventures in hell. Together the team works to thwart the devil and his army of villainous minions (including Adolf Hitler, Sadam Hussein, Joseph Stalin, and Osama bin Ladin, among others). Funded through an online campaign, the series is published by Splatto Comics.

=== Video games ===
- The Expendables 8-bit is a single-player side-scroller browser video game created by Flipline Studios as a promotion for the first movie in collaboration with Lionsgate. Stylized after Nintendo Entertainment System games, playable characters included Barney Ross, Lee Christmas, and Yin Yang. It was available for free on the official Facebook page for the movie.
- The Expendables 2 Videogame is a downloadable four-player cooperative shoot 'em up video game. It was published by Ubisoft for PC, PlayStation Network (PSN) and Xbox Live Arcade (XBLA) and released on July 31, 2012, for PSN and August 20 for PC (via Steam) and XBLA. The game's plot is a prequel to The Expendables 2, with Barney Ross, Gunnar Jensen, Yin Yang and Hale Caesar appearing as playable characters. Lundgren and Crews voiced their respective characters.
- The Expendables 2: Deploy & Destroy is a single-player tower defense, real-time strategy online-only game. Published by Roadshow Films and Soap Creative, the game was released on July 13, 2012. Its plot was derived from village scenes in the film, where players can choose their squad from the cast, set up defenses and battle the enemy.
- The Expendables III: Deploy & Destroy Reloaded
- The Expendabros: A standalone expansion of the game Broforce based on The Expendables 3 and released in August 2014. Later, The Expendabros expansion became free to play in order to promote The Expendables 3 and remained so until December 31 of the same year when it was discontinued.

== Cancelled projects ==
In May 2013, Original Entertainment confirmed a five-picture deal with Millennium Films to produce Bollywood remakes of First Blood, The Expendables, 16 Blocks, 88 Minutes, and Brooklyn's Finest, with the productions for First Blood and The Expendables expected to start at the end of that year.
