= The Expendables (2010 film) =

2010 film by Sylvester Stallone

- Theatrical release poster
- Directed by: Sylvester Stallone
- Screenplay by: David Callaham; Sylvester Stallone
- Story by: David Callaham
- Produced by: Avi Lerner; John Thompson; Kevin King-Templeton
- Starring: Sylvester Stallone; Jason Statham; Jet Li; Dolph Lundgren; Eric Roberts; Randy Couture; Steve Austin; David Zayas; Giselle Itié; Charisma Carpenter; Gary Daniels; Terry Crews; Mickey Rourke
- Cinematography: Jeffrey Kimball
- Edited by: Ken Blackwell; Paul Harb
- Music by: Brian Tyler
- Production companies: Millennium Films; Nu Image
- Distributed by: Lionsgate
- Release dates: August 3, 2010 (Los Angeles); August 13, 2010 (United States)
- Running time: 103 minutes
- Country: United States
- Language: English
- Budget: $80–82 million
- Box office: $274.5 million

The Expendables is a 2010 American action film directed by and starring Sylvester Stallone, who co-wrote the screenplay with David Callaham. The first installment in The Expendables franchise, the film co-stars an ensemble cast of mostly action film actors, including Jason Statham, Jet Li, Dolph Lundgren, Randy Couture, Terry Crews, Steve Austin, Mickey Rourke, and Bruce Willis. The film is about a team of elite mercenaries tasked with a mission to overthrow a Latin American dictator whom they soon discover to be a mere puppet controlled by a corrupt ex-CIA agent. It pays tribute to the blockbuster action films of the late 1980s and early 1990s.

The Expendables was released in the United States on August 13, 2010 by Lionsgate. It received mixed reviews from critics, with some praise for the action sequences, and grossed $274 million. It was followed by three sequels: The Expendables 2 (2012), The Expendables 3 (2014), and Expend4bles (2023).

== Plot ==
An elite group of mercenaries named The Expendables, who are based in New Orleans, deploys to the Gulf of Aden to save hostages on a vessel from Somali pirates. The team consists of leader Barney Ross, blade specialist Lee Christmas, martial artist Yin Yang, chemical engineer Gunner Jensen, weapons specialist Hale Caesar, and demolitions expert Toll Road. Gunner instigates a firefight, causing casualties for the pirates. He then tries to hang a pirate, but Yang stops him when Barney and the team discourage the idea. Barney reluctantly discharges him from the team.

Later, Christmas is upset to discover his girlfriend Lacy has left him for another man. Barney and rival Trench Mauser visit "Mr. Church" for a mission. Trench passes the contract to Barney, which is to overthrow dictator General Garza in Vilena, an island in the Gulf of Mexico. Barney and Christmas fly to Vilena for undercover reconnaissance and meet their contact, Sandra, but are discovered. It is revealed that ex-CIA officer James Munroe is keeping Garza in power as a figurehead for his own profiteering operations, while Sandra is revealed to be Garza's daughter. Barney aborts, but Sandra refuses to leave Vilena.

Meanwhile, Gunner approaches Munroe to help and Garza is angered further when Sandra is waterboarded for information by Munroe. Meanwhile, Lacy has been physically abused by her new man, so Christmas beats him and his friends, revealing what he does for a living. Barney and the group discover that Church is a CIA operative and the real target is Munroe, who has gone rogue and joined forces with Garza to keep the drug money that funds the CIA to himself, but the CIA cannot afford a mission to kill one of their own directly because of bad publicity. Barney meets tattoo expert and friend Tool to express his feelings. Tool makes a confession about letting a woman commit suicide instead of saving her.

Barney is then motivated to go back for Sandra alone, but Yang accompanies him. Gunner and hired men pursue them on the road, ending in an abandoned warehouse, where Yang and Gunner fight a second time. Barney shoots Gunner when he attempts to impale Yang on a pipe. Gunner makes amends and gives the layout of Garza's palace. Barney boards the plane with Yang and finds the rest of the team waiting, and they infiltrate Garza's compound. Thinking Munroe hired the team to kill him, Garza has his soldiers' faces painted, preparing them for a fight. The team plants explosives throughout the site but Barney, while saving Sandra, is captured by Munroe's henchmen.

The team saves him and kills the Brit, but is pinned down by Garza's men as Paine wrestles Barney. Caesar fights back and Paine escapes. Garza finally stands up to Munroe, ordering him out and returning his money. Instead, as Garza rallies his men against the Americans, Munroe kills him and escapes with Paine and Sandra. Garza's men open fire against the team, who fight their way through, detonating the explosives and destroying the compound. Toll kills Paine by burning him alive while Barney and Caesar manage to destroy the helicopter before Munroe can escape. Barney and Christmas catch up to Munroe, where they save Sandra and kill Munroe.

Later, Barney donates his mission reward for Sandra to restore Vilena. The team has returned home and are celebrating at Tool's tattoo parlor with the recovering and now redeemed Gunner. Christmas and Tool play a game of knife throwing during which Christmas composes a mocking poem about Tool and throws a bullseye from outside the building.

== Cast ==
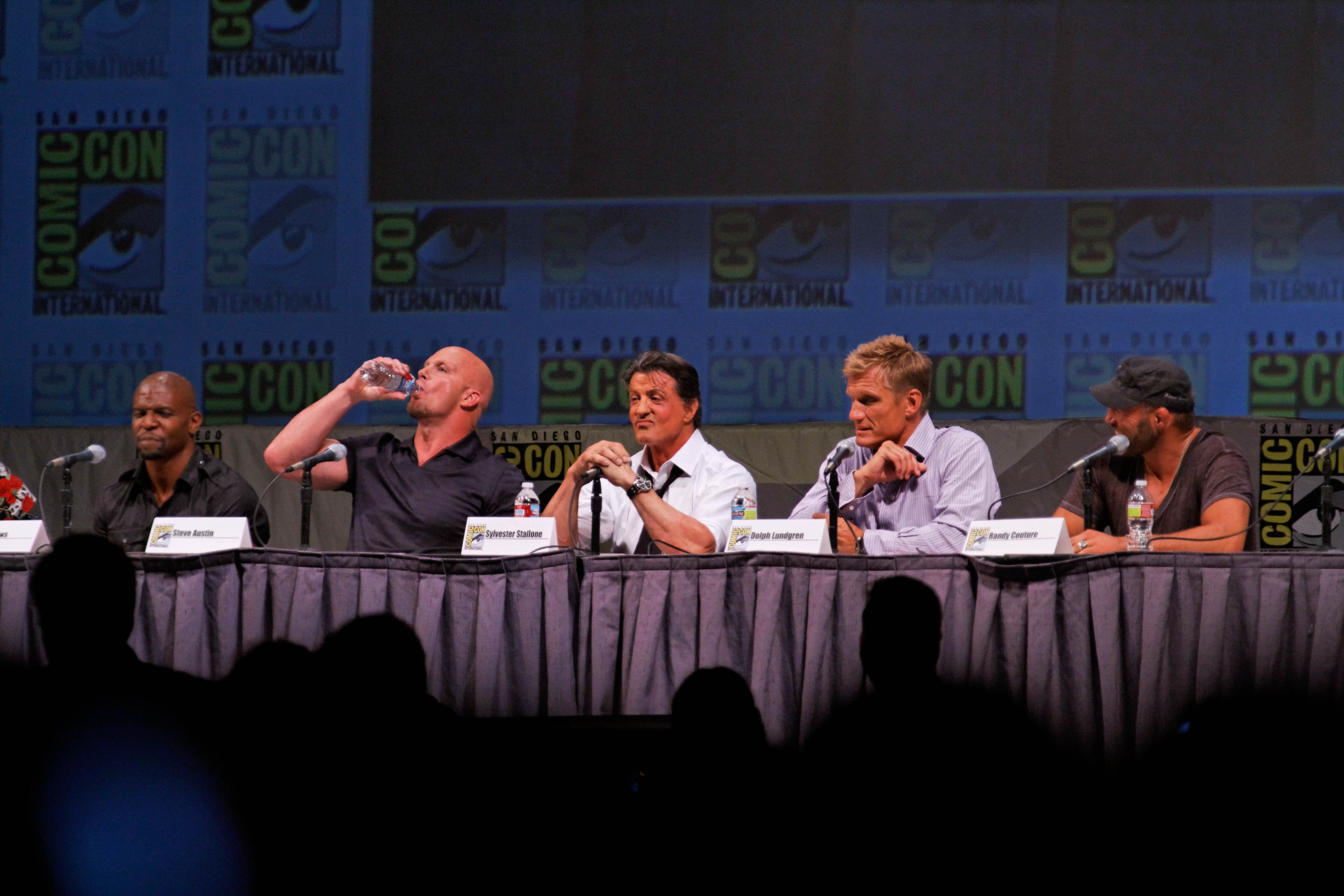
Crews, Austin, Stallone, Lundgren and Couture promoting The Expendables at the 2010 San Diego Comic-Con.

- Sylvester Stallone as Barney Ross
- Jason Statham as Lee Christmas
- Jet Li as Yin Yang
- Dolph Lundgren as Gunner Jensen
- Randy Couture as Toll Road
- David Zayas as General Garza
- Giselle Itié as Sandra
- Charisma Carpenter as Lacy
- Gary Daniels as The Brit
- Terry Crews as Hale Caesar
- Mickey Rourke as Tool
- Bruce Willis as Mr. Church
- Arnold Schwarzenegger as Trench Mauser (uncredited cameo)
- Eric Roberts as James Munroe
- Steve Austin as Paine

== Production ==
=== Development ===
In mid-2005, writer David Callaham submitted the first draft of a mercenary-inspired action film titled "Barrow" to Warner Bros., as part of his "blind commitment" deal with the studio at the time. Callaham revised the script two more times and submitted his third final revision in early 2006. Having expressed interest in doing an ensemble film, Sylvester Stallone reviewed Callaham's third/final revised draft of Barrow and used it as a "starting point" for The Expendables.

=== Casting ===
Jean-Claude Van Damme was personally offered a role by Stallone, but turned it down because he felt there was no substance or development to the character. Stallone said that Van Damme told him that he should "be trying to save people in South Central." At the premiere of the film, Stallone claimed to have been speaking to Van Damme over the phone and had said, "I told you!", to which Van Damme concurred and expressed his regret over not participating. Van Damme would later appear as the main antagonist, Jean Vilain, in the film's sequel.

The role of Hale Caesar was initially conceived as a role for Stallone's Demolition Man co-star Wesley Snipes. Snipes turned down the role because of his tax issues, and not able to leave the United States without the court's approval. It was later rewritten for Forest Whitaker. Due to a scheduling conflict prior to filming, Whitaker was replaced by 50 Cent before the part of Hale Caesar finally went to former NFL player Terry Crews. Snipes and 50 Cent would star in the third and fourth movies in the series respectively.

Steven Seagal was asked to make a cameo appearance, but turned down the offer due to negative experiences with producer Avi Lerner.

Robert De Niro, Al Pacino, Ben Kingsley, and Ray Liotta were all considered for the role of James Munroe before Stallone's The Specialist co-star Eric Roberts was eventually cast in the role.

By May 2009, the script had undergone a number of rewrites. Stallone's Demolition Man co-star Sandra Bullock was rumored to have a role in the film, but revealed that she did not even know about the project. Despite the news, she did express interest in working in another action film and would have liked to appear in the film, depending on the storyline.

The role of the man who hires the Expendables, Mr. Church, was difficult to cast. Schwarzenegger was offered that role, but instead appeared as fellow mercenary leader Trench. The role was then offered to Stallone's Tango & Cash co-star Kurt Russell, whose agent replied that he was not interested in "ensemble acting at the moment". Stallone spent several months after principal photography determined to find a big action name for the part. Rumors suggested that the role had been offered to friend and fellow former Planet Hollywood co-owner Bruce Willis, who was busy filming Cop Out. Willis' casting as Mr. Church was confirmed by August 2009, as was that he would appear in a scene with both Stallone and Schwarzenegger.

To cast the soldiers, Stallone knew his filming location, Brazil, was home to many mixed martial arts fighters. He called Ultimate Fighting Championship champions Anderson Silva and brothers Rogerio and Antonio Rodrigo Nogueira to make casting calls, and had the three cameo as well.

=== Filming ===
Film production began on March 3, 2009, with a budget of $82 million.

Principal photography commenced 25 days later in Rio de Janeiro and other locations in Brazil, including Mangaratiba, Niterói, Guanabara Bay, Colônia Juliano Moreira and Parque Lage. Filming originally ended on April 25 but was continued on May 11, in Elmwood and New Orleans, Louisiana, including the French Quarter, South Peters Street, Fort Macomb, Claiborne Avenue and the Interstate 10 overpass. Filming officially ended on July 1, but on October 27 there was a pick-up scene at a church in Los Angeles, California featuring Stallone, Schwarzenegger and Willis (the latter two doing the scene without compensation, according to Stallone in the Blu-ray Disc director commentary). On June 2, West Coast Customs Street Customs built three customized 1955 Ford F100s for Sylvester Stallone for the film. One was built for a crash scene, the second for green screen, and the third for Stallone to keep. "The Expendables has a seventy million dollar budget," Stallone's Rocky IV co-star Dolph Lundgren says: "It's an old-school, kick-ass action movie where people are fighting with knives and shooting at each other." The flying boat used for filming is a Grumman HU-16 Albatross and the ship used as a setting in the opening scene was a Russian SA-15 type Arctic cargo ship Igarka.

In Summer 2010, Brazilian company O2 Filmes released a statement saying it was still owed more than US$2 million for its work on the film.

== Music ==
Composer Brian Tyler announced on his official website that he had been hired to write original music for the film. Tyler previously worked with Stallone on Rambo in 2008.

Godsmack vocalist Sully Erna was approached by Stallone himself to write a song for the film. Erna showed him a potential unfinished piece of "Sinners Prayer"; Stallone liked it and wanted to use it in the film. However, during the film's post-production, the scene that "Sinner's Prayer" was originally meant to be used in was reworked and the song was taken off the film and its soundtrack. The American hard rock band Shinedown contributed a brand new track, "Diamond Eyes (Boom-Lay Boom-Lay Boom)", recorded specifically for the film, but the song does not appear in the film nor its official soundtrack. The song was used in the theatrical trailer and the finished piece was released on June 15, 2010. Both songs were finally used for the Extended Director's Cut. One of the alternate trailers uses the song "Paradise City" by Guns N' Roses. The song "The Boys Are Back in Town" by Thin Lizzy (live version featured on Still Dangerous) played in TV spots and is played over the credits.

The score for the film was released on August 10. The track lists have been revealed.

== Release ==
=== Theatrical ===
The film had an original scheduled release date set at April 23, 2010, but was later pushed back four months until August 13, to extend production time. On March 17, 2010, the official international poster for the film was released. A promo trailer (aimed at industry professionals) was leaked online in August 2009. Sometime in October, nearly two months after the promo trailer was leaked, it was officially released online. The promo trailer was edited by Stallone and it was shown at the Venice Film Festival. On April 1, 2010, the official theatrical trailer for the film was released. The film had its red carpet Hollywood premiere on August 3, 2010. The grand premiere of the film was held at the Planet Hollywood Resort and Casino on the Las Vegas Strip in Paradise, Nevada on August 10, 2010.

=== Lawsuit ===
In 2011, writer Marcus Webb sued Stallone, Callaham, and the producers of The Expendables for stealing elements from his similarly mercenary themed script The Cordoba Caper. The following year, U.S. District Judge Jed Rakoff dismissed Webb's case on a summary judgement after failing to provide sufficient evidence of "striking similarities." Rakoff noted that Writers Guild of America arbitration proved that The Expendables was loosely based on Callaham's Barrow script, which was written before Webb's script. Rakoff also pointed out that The Expendables is a straight forward action film while The Cordoba Caper is more similar to caper films like The Sting; he also noted that any similarities were due to Scènes à faire as opposed to plagiarism.

=== Home media ===
The theatrical cut of The Expendables was released on DVD/Blu-ray Disc on November 23, 2010. The Blu-ray Disc is a 3-disc combo pack.

An Extended Director's Cut of the film was meant to be out for an early 2011 DVD/Blu-ray Disc release, but was first released on cable television instead. The Extended Director's Cut was released on Blu-ray Disc on December 13, 2011. A 90-minute documentary called Inferno: The Making of The Expendables was released exclusively to the theatrical cut's Blu-ray release.

=== Extended Director's Cut ===
The Extended Director's Cut premiered on Epix on May 30, 2011, for the Memorial Day weekend. The Extended Cut contains roughly 11 minutes of additional footage and reintroduces the Shinedown song "Diamond Eyes" to the soundtrack, both during the climactic shootout and again over the end credits, and the song "Sinners Prayer" by Sully Erna in the new opening credits.

== Reception ==
=== Box office ===
The film made its US debut at 3,270 theaters with approximately 4,300 screens, which earned it the #10 spot on the list of the "Biggest Independent Releases of All Time" at Box Office Mojo and the #16 spot on their list of top opening weekends for August. It earned $34.8 million in its opening weekend and took the #1 position in the U.S. box office. On the day of its release, the film earned $13.3 million in sales, exceeding the $9.7 million sum from the debut of the last previous summer action film The A-Team.

Brandon Gray of Box Office Mojo stated that the film "took a commanding lead in its debut", compared to competing films Eat Pray Love and Scott Pilgrim vs. the World. Ben Fritz of the Los Angeles Times stated that the "over-the-top shoot-'em-up" opened to a "very strong" reception. As well, he described it as "a crowd-pleaser even if critics didn't take to it." Research by Lionsgate found that between 38% and 40% of the film's viewers were female. The results were unexpected, for a film thought to have limited appeal to female filmgoers.

The Expendables remained at the top position in the U.S. box office during its second weekend, earning a weekend total of nearly $17 million.

The film went on to gross $103.1 million in the United States, and $171.4 million in other territories, for a worldwide gross total of $274.5 million.

=== Critical response ===
On review aggregator Rotten Tomatoes, the film has an approval rating of 41% based on 206 reviews. The site's critical consensus reads, "It makes good on the old-school action it promises, but given all the talent on display, The Expendables should hit harder." On Metacritic, which assigns a normalized rating to reviews, the film has a mean score of 45 out of 100 based on 35 critics, indicating "mixed or average reviews". On CinemaScore polls, audiences gave the film an average grade of "B+" on an A+ to F scale.

Some reviews praised the film highly. The Hollywood Reporter stated that "the body count is high and the personalities click in this old-school testosterone fest", and Boxoffice Magazine stated that "it's filled with literally explosive excitement" and that "a who's who of classic action stars light up the screen for pure combustible entertainment in Sly Stallone's The Expendables, a sort of Dirty Dozen meets Inglourious Basterds—and then some…" Richard Corliss of Time added that "what you will find is both familiar in its contours and unique in its casting." Peter Paras of E! Online said that the film is "peppered with funny dialogue, epic brawls and supersize explosions", and that "The Expendables is the adrenaline shot the summer of 2010 needs", and the Boston Globe stated that the film is "a lot of unholy fun". Empire's Genevieve Harrison gave the film a 3/5 stars rating and remarked, "More The Wild Geese than The Wild Bunch, The Expendables is not a wasted opportunity, but more one not fully exploited. For action fans raised on Commando and Cobra, the ensemble cast and '80s-style violence will be pure wish-fulfilment—but even they could have wished for something better."

Some highly negative reviews appeared. In The New Yorker, Anthony Lane called it "breathtakingly sleazy in its lack of imagination". Peter Travers, writing for Rolling Stone, said, "Stallone forgets to include non-spazzy direction, a coherent plot, dialogue that actors can speak without cringing, stunts that don't fizzle, blood that isn't digital and an animating spirit that might convince us to give a damn." Claudia Puig, writing the review for USA Today, summed the film up as a "sadistic mess of a movie".

Rourke's performance was given special recognition by some critics. In the Chicago Tribune, Michael Phillips said, "Rourke delivers a monologue about his time in Bosnia, and the conviction the actor brings to the occasion throws the movie completely out of whack. What's actual acting doing in a movie like this?" Mick LaSalle of the San Francisco Chronicle praised Rourke for the same scene, stating, "He's amazing…a great actor."

=== Accolades ===
Date	Award	Category	Recipients	Result	Ref.
February 1, 2011	Visual Effects Society	Outstanding Models in a Feature Motion Picture	Gene Warren Jr., Christopher Warren, Gene Warren III – "The Palace Explodes"	Nominated	
February 26, 2011	Golden Raspberry Awards	Worst Director	Sylvester Stallone	Nominated	
June 23, 2011	Saturn Awards	Best Action or Adventure Film	The Expendables	Nominated	

== Sequels ==
Three sequels titled The Expendables 2, The Expendables 3 and Expend4bles were released in 2012, 2014, and 2023.

== See also ==
- List of American films of 2010
- Sylvester Stallone filmography
- Jason Statham filmography
- Jet Li filmography
- Dolph Lundgren filmography
- Bruce Willis filmography
- Arnold Schwarzenegger filmography
