= Brian Tyler =

American composer (born 1972)

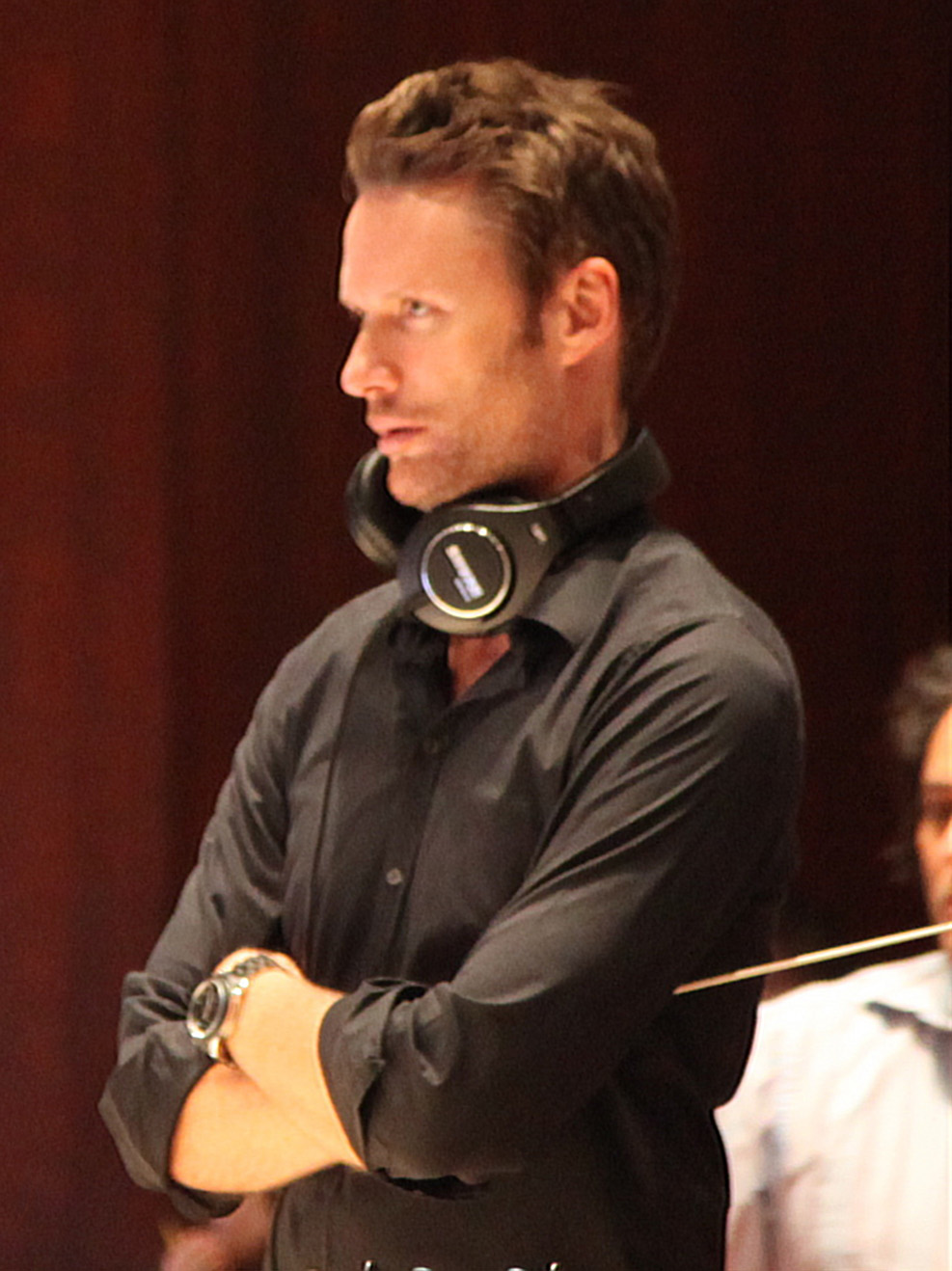
- Tyler in 2011
- Born: Brian Theodore Tyler; May 8, 1972 (age 54); Orange County, California, U.S.
- Education: University of California, Los Angeles; Harvard University
- Occupations: Composer; conductor; arranger; producer
- Years active: 1996–present
- Relatives: Walter H. Tyler (grandfather)
- Musical career
- Also known as: Madsonik
- Genres: Film score; contemporary classical; rock; electronic rock; EDM; jazz rock; Drum N Bass; new-age
- Instruments: Vocals; piano; keyboards; synthesizer; guitar; bass; drums; percussion; GuitarViol; charango; bouzouki
- Website: briantyler.com

Brian Theodore Tyler (born May 8, 1972) is an American composer, conductor, arranger and multi-instrumentalist best known for his film, television, and video game scores. In his 26-year career, Tyler has scored seven installments of the Fast & Furious franchise, Aliens vs. Predator: Requiem, the fourth and fifth films of the Rambo franchise, Eagle Eye, the fourth and fifth films of the Final Destination franchise, the first three films of The Expendables franchise, the Marvel Cinematic Universe films Iron Man 3, Thor: The Dark World, and Avengers: Age of Ultron alongside Danny Elfman, the Now You See Me franchise, Crazy Rich Asians, the fifth and sixth films of the Scream franchise, The Super Mario Bros. Movie, and its sequel, The Super Mario Galaxy Movie, among others.

Tyler also created the current arrangement of the Universal Pictures logo fanfare (originally composed by Jerry Goldsmith) which debuted with The Lorax (2012) in celebration of Universal Pictures' 100th anniversary. He also composed the 2013–2016 Marvel Studios logo, which debuted with Thor: The Dark World (2013), which he also composed the film's score. He composed the NFL Sunday Countdown Theme for ESPN, the Formula One theme (also used in Formula 2 and Formula 3), and the anthem for the Esports World Cup. He is also behind the soundtrack of many television series including Yellowstone, 1883 and 1923, all with Breton Vivian. For his work as a film composer, he won the IFMCA Awards 2014 Composer of the Year.

His composition for the film Last Call earned him the first of three Emmy nominations, a gold record, and induction into the music branch of the Academy of Motion Picture Arts and Sciences. As of April 2026, his films are approaching $20 billion at the global box office, putting him in the top 10 highest-grossing film composers of all time.

He also has an electronic music alias, "Are We Dreaming".

== Early life and education ==
Tyler was born and raised in Orange County, California. His grandfather was art director Walter H. Tyler. One of his first major influences was his pianist grandmother. He holds a bachelor's degree from the University of California, Los Angeles and a master's from Harvard University. Growing up, he taught himself to play dozens of musical instruments, including drums, piano, guitar, bass, cello, world percussion, synthesizer, charango and bouzouki.

== Career ==
=== Film ===
Tyler began scoring features shortly after graduating from Harvard. Robert Kraft, who was impressed with Tyler's music, encouraged him to pursue a career in film scoring. Tyler's first film score was for the independent film Bartender (1997), directed by Gabe Torres. The following year, he and Red Elvises composed the score for Six-String Samurai (1998).

Tyler's breakthrough came in the early 2000s, after composing for the Frailty (2001). His work on Last Call (2002) earned him an induction into the music branch of the Academy of Motion Picture Arts and Sciences. Director William Friedkin, impressed with Tyler's work on Frailty, engaged him to compose for The Hunted (2003), which earned Tyler a World Soundtrack Award in 2002 for Best New Film Composer of the Year. Starting in 2003, Tyler began working on big-budget films, including Timeline (2003), Godsend (2004), The Greatest Game Ever Played (2005), and Constantine (2005). His cues for Children of Dune were used in multiple other theatrical film trailers, including Master and Commander (2003), Sahara (2005), Cinderella Man (2005), The Chronicles of Narnia: The Lion, the Witch and the Wardrobe (2005), Indiana Jones and the Kingdom of the Crystal Skull (2008), and Star Trek (2009). The track "Summon the Worms" was used as a leader for the Dutch show Peking Express, and in the first leaked promotional reel for The Golden Compass (2007).

In 2007, he was hired to compose for Partition (2007), where he integrated Indian and Middle Eastern music with orchestral writing. He conducted the orchestral portion of the score with the Hollywood Studio Symphony in Los Angeles.

On September 5, 2011, Tyler announced that he was in talks to score the 2011 remake of Highlander, and pilot episodes for the animated series Transformers: Prime. He scored four episodes of the latter.

In 2012, Tyler scored and arranged a new version of the fanfare of the Universal Pictures logo, originally composed by Jerry Goldsmith, in observance of the studio's 100th anniversary. The new score added a choir, a more majestic arranging style, and a closing drum cadence. It made its debut alongside the logo with The Lorax on March 2, 2012.

In 2013, Tyler composed the fanfare of Marvel Studios, which made its debut alongside the logo with Thor: The Dark World, which he also composed the score of the film, on October 23, 2013, at the Odeon Leicester Square.

In addition to composing the score for Teenage Mutant Ninja Turtles (2014), an original song was released for the film entitled "Shell Shocked", credited to Tyler as his stage name Madsonik, alongside Kill the Noise, Wiz Khalifa, Ty Dolla $ign, Juicy J, Moxie Raia, and Seann Bowe. It reached No. 2 on the iTunes hip-hop singles charts and has sold over 500,000 copies.

On October 12, 2016, Tyler was hired to score the 2017 action-adventure film XXX: Return of Xander Cage. He also contributed to the soundtrack by his stage name Madsonik, in a collaboration with Tom Morello and Kill The Noise entitled "Divebomb".

On March 2, 2018, he announced on Twitter that he had been hired to write a new theme for Formula One; it was released on March 23. The theme was also used in both Formula 2 and Formula 3 since 2019, as well as the F1 Academy since 2023. In August 2018, a 27-track soundtrack composed by Tyler for the cable TV series Yellowstone was issued in CD format and as an MP3 download on Amazon.

On July 16, 2024, it was announced that Tyler composed the official anthem of the Esports World Cup (an esports tournament series held in Saudi Arabia), entitled "Dare to Triumph".

=== Music ===
Tyler is the musician behind the audio-visual project "Are We Dreaming". In an interview with BMI, he described his project as an exploration of space and the connection to human emotion driven through his usual film soundtrack style.

== Personal life ==
Tyler got divorced from his first wife on December 23, 2009. He remarried on June 29, 2013. He has no children.

== Discography ==
=== Theatrical films ===
Year	Title	Director	Notes
1997	Bartender	Gabe Torres	—N/a
1998	Six-String Samurai	Lance Mungia	Composed with Red Elvises
1999	The Settlement	Mark Steilen	—N/a
1999	The 4th Floor	Josh Klausner	—N/a
1999	Simon Sez	Kevin Alyn Elders	—N/a
2000	Panic	Henry Bromell	—N/a
2000	Shadow Hours	Isaac H. Eaton	—N/a
2000	Four Dogs Playing Poker	Paul Rachman	—N/a
2000	Terror Tract	Lance W. Dreesen; Clint Hutchison	—N/a
2001	Plan B	Greg Yaitanes	—N/a
2001	The Fast and the Furious	Rob Cohen	"Fourth Floor" track, main score composed by BT (Brian Transeau)
2001	Frailty	Bill Paxton	Nominated – Fangoria Chainsaw Award for Best Score; Nominated – IFMCA Award for Best Original Score for a Horror/Thriller Film
2002	Bubba Ho-tep	Don Coscarelli	—N/a
2002	Vampires: Los Muertos	Tommy Lee Wallace	—N/a
2003	Darkness Falls	Jonathan Liebesman	—N/a
2003	The Hunted	William Friedkin	—N/a
2003	The Big Empty	Steve Anderson	—N/a
2003	Timeline	Richard Donner	Replaced Jerry Goldsmith
2004	The Final Cut	Omar Naim	Nominated – IFMCA Award for Best Original Score for a Horror/Thriller Film
2004	Godsend	Nick Hamm	—N/a
2004	Perfect Opposites	Matt Cooper	—N/a
2004	Paparazzi	Paul Abascal	—N/a
2005	Constantine	Francis Lawrence	Composed with Klaus Badelt; Nominated – IFMCA Award for Best Original Score for a Horror/Thriller Film
2005	The Greatest Game Ever Played	Bill Paxton	—N/a
2006	Annapolis	Justin Lin	—N/a
2006	Bug	William Friedkin	—N/a
2006	The Fast and the Furious: Tokyo Drift	Justin Lin	—N/a
2007	Finishing the Game	Justin Lin	—N/a
2007	Partition	Vic Sarin	—N/a
2007	War	Philip Atwell	—N/a
2007	Aliens vs. Predator: Requiem	The Brothers Strause	Original Alien themes by James Horner, Elliot Goldenthal & John Frizzell and original Predator themes by Alan Silvestri
2008	Rambo	Sylvester Stallone	Original Rambo themes by Jerry Goldsmith
2008	Bangkok Dangerous	Pang Brothers	—N/a
2008	Eagle Eye	D. J. Caruso	—N/a
2008	The Lazarus Project	John Patrick Glenn	—N/a
2009	The Killing Room	Jonathan Liebesman	Nominated – IFMCA Award for Best Original Score for a Horror/Thriller Film
2009	Dragonball Evolution	James Wong	—N/a
2009	Fast & Furious	Justin Lin	—N/a
2009	The Final Destination	David R. Ellis	Original Final Destination themes by Shirley Walker
2009	Middle Men	George Gallo	—N/a
2009	Law Abiding Citizen	F. Gary Gray	—N/a
2010	The Expendables	Sylvester Stallone	BMI Film Music Award
2011	Battle: Los Angeles	Jonathan Liebesman	BMI Film Music Award
2011	Fast Five	Justin Lin	BMI Film Music Award
2011	Final Destination 5	Steven Quale	—N/a
2012	John Dies at the End	Don Coscarelli	—N/a
2012	Columbus Circle	George Gallo	—N/a
2012	Brake	Gabe Torres	—N/a
2012	The Expendables 2	Simon West	BMI Film Music Award
2013	Iron Man 3	Shane Black	BMI Film Music Award; Nominated – Saturn Award for Best Music; Nominated – IFMCA Award for Best Original Score for an Action/Adventure Film
2013	Now You See Me	Louis Leterrier	Nominated – Saturn Award for Best Music
2013	Standing Up	D. J. Caruso	—N/a
2013	Thor: The Dark World	Alan Taylor	Themes by Patrick Doyle Replaced Carter Burwell
2014	Teenage Mutant Ninja Turtles	Jonathan Liebesman	—N/a
2014	The Expendables 3	Patrick Hughes	—N/a
2014	Into the Storm	Steven Quale	—N/a
2015	Furious 7	James Wan	—N/a
2015	Avengers: Age of Ultron	Joss Whedon	Composed with Danny Elfman; Themes by Alan Silvestri; BMI Film Music Award; Nominated – Hollywood Music in Media Award for Best Original Score in a Sci-Fi Film
2015	The Disappointments Room	D. J. Caruso	—N/a
2015	Truth	James Vanderbilt	—N/a
2016	Criminal	Ariel Vromen	Composed with Keith Power
2016	Now You See Me 2	Jon M. Chu	—N/a
2017	XXX: Return of Xander Cage	D. J. Caruso	Composed with Robert Lydecker
2017	Power Rangers	Dean Israelite	—N/a
2017	The Fate of the Furious	F. Gary Gray	—N/a
2017	The Mummy	Alex Kurtzman	—N/a
2018	Crazy Rich Asians	Jon M. Chu	Nominated – IFMCA Award for Best Original Score for a Comedy Film
2019	Escape Room	Adam Robitel	Composed with John Carey
2019	What Men Want	Adam Shankman	—N/a
2019	Five Feet Apart	Justin Baldoni	Composed with Breton Vivian
2019	Liberation	Danial Hajibarat	—N/a
2019	Ready or Not	Matt Bettinelli-Olpin; Tyler Gillett	—N/a
2019	Rambo: Last Blood	Adrian Grunberg	Original Rambo themes by Jerry Goldsmith
2019	Charlie's Angels	Elizabeth Banks	—N/a
2020	Clouds	Justin Baldoni	—N/a
2021	Those Who Wish Me Dead	Taylor Sheridan	—N/a
2021	F9	Justin Lin	—N/a
2021	Escape Room: Tournament of Champions	Adam Robitel	Composed with John Carey
2022	Scream	Matt Bettinelli-Olpin; Tyler Gillett	Original Scream themes by Marco Beltrami
2022	Redeeming Love	D. J. Caruso	Composed with Breton Vivian
2022	Chip 'n Dale: Rescue Rangers	Akiva Schaffer	—N/a
2023	Scream VI	Matt Bettinelli-Olpin; Tyler Gillett	Composed with Sven Faulconer
2023	The Super Mario Bros. Movie	Aaron Horvath; Michael Jelenic	First score for an animated theatrical film Original Nintendo themes by Koji Kondo
2023	Fast X	Louis Leterrier	—N/a
2024	Abigail	Matt Bettinelli-Olpin; Tyler Gillett	—N/a
2024	Transformers One	Josh Cooley	—N/a
2025	Nuremberg	James Vanderbilt	—N/a
2025	Now You See Me: Now You Don't	Ruben Fleischer	
2026	The Super Mario Galaxy Movie	Aaron Horvath; Michael Jelenic	

=== Short films ===
Year	Title	Director	Notes
2001	Offside	Leanna Creel	—N/a
2003	Last Stand	Gabe Torres	—N/a
2005	Clair obscur	Benjamin Lemaire	—N/a
2011	Tattoo	Bill Paxton	—N/a
2014	All Hail the King	Drew Pearce	Composed with Mike Post

=== Television film ===
Year	Title	Director	Notes
1998	Final Justice	Tommy Lee Wallace	—N/a
1999	Sirens	John Sacret Young	—N/a
2000	Trapped in a Purple Haze	Eric Laneuville	—N/a
2001	Jane Doe	Kevin Alyn Elders	—N/a
2002	Last Call	Henry Bromell	Nominated – Primetime Emmy Award for Outstanding Music Composition for a Limited Series
2003	Thoughtcrimes	Breck Eisner	—N/a
2005	Painkiller Jane	Sanford Bookstaver	—N/a
2013	Transformers Prime Beast Hunters: Predacons Rising	Vinton Heuck; Scooter Tidwell; Todd Waterman	First score for an animated film
2014	Marvel Studios: Assembling a Universe	—N/a	Television special
2015	Edge	Shane Black	Television pilot

=== Television series ===
Year	Title	Notes
1997	Jenny	17 episodes
1998	Living in Captivity	8 episodes
2000	Level 9	13 episodes
2001	The Education of Max Bickford	22 episodes
2003	Frank Herbert's Children of Dune	3 episodes
2003	Star Trek: Enterprise	Episodes "Canamar" and "Regeneration"
2007	Fear Itself	Episode: "The Sacrifice"
2010–20	Hawaii Five-0	155 episodes Composed with Keith Power
2010–13	Transformers: Prime	65 episodes Composed with Matthew Margeson; Nominated – Daytime Emmy Award for Outstanding Music Direction and Composition
2011	Terra Nova	13 episodes
2013–17	Sleepy Hollow	36 episodes Composed with Robert Lydecker; Nominated – Primetime Emmy Award for Outstanding Original Main Title Theme Music
2014–18	Scorpion	66 episodes Composed with Tony Morales
2018–24	Yellowstone	47 episodes Composed with Breton Vivian
2019	Swamp Thing	10 episodes
2021–22	1883	10 episodes Composed with Breton Vivian
2022–present	1923	8 episodes Composed with Breton Vivian

=== Video games ===
Year	Title	Notes
2010	Lego Universe	—N/a
2011	Call of Duty: Modern Warfare 3	—N/a
2011	Need for Speed: The Run	—N/a
2012	Far Cry 3	Nominated- BAFTA Games Award for Best Audio Achievement
2013	Army of Two: The Devil's Cartel	—N/a
2013	Assassin's Creed IV: Black Flag	Nominated- BAFTA Games Award for Best Original Music
2018	F1 2018	Composed the theme song for Formula One
2019	Lost Ark	Composed track "Bon Voyage"; Main score composed by Yong Kim
2019	F1 2019	Composed the theme song for Formula One
2020	PUBG Mobile / Game for Peace (Peacekeeper Elite)	Composed track "Meteor Crisis" for the Chinese version
2020	F1 2020	Composed the theme song for Formula One
2021	F1 2021	Composed the theme song for Formula One
2022	F1 22	Composed the theme song for Formula One
2022	F1 Manager 2022	Composed the theme song for Formula One
2023	F1 23	Composed the theme song for Formula One
2023	F1 Manager 2023	Composed the theme song for Formula One
2024	F1 24	Composed the theme song for Formula One
2024	F1 Manager 2024	Composed the theme song for Formula One
2025	F1 25	Composed the theme song for Formula One
2026	Assassin's Creed: Black Flag Resynced	Reused soundtrack from Assassin's Creed IV: Black Flag. Co-credited with Stephen Lukach, who composed 22 new music.

== Awards and nominations ==
Year	Award	Nominated work	Result	Ref.
2002	Primetime Emmy Award for Outstanding Music Composition for a Miniseries, Movie, or a Special	Last Call	Nominated	
2003	Fangoria Chainsaw Award for Best Score	Frailty	Won	
2004	International Film Music Critics Award for Best Original Score for a Horror/Thriller Film	The Final Cut	Nominated	
2009	International Film Music Critics Award for Film Composer of the Year	—N/a	Nominated	
2009	International Film Music Critics Award for Best Original Score for a Horror/Thriller Film	The Killing Room	Nominated	
2010	International Film Music Critics Award for Best Original Score for a Video Game or Interactive Media	Lego Universe	Nominated	
2011	Daytime Emmy Award for Outstanding Music Direction and Composition	Transformers: Prime	Nominated	
2011	International Film Music Critics Award for Best Original Score for a Video Game or Interactive Media	Call of Duty: Modern Warfare 3	Nominated	
2013	International Film Music Critics Award for Film Composer of the Year	—N/a	Nominated	
2013	International Film Music Critics Award for Best Original Score for a Video Game or Interactive Media	Assassin's Creed IV: Black Flag	Nominated	
2013	International Film Music Critics Award for Best Original Score for an Action/Adventure/Thriller Film	Iron Man 3	Nominated	
2014	Saturn Award for Best Music	Iron Man 3	Nominated	
2014	Saturn Award for Best Music	Now You See Me	Nominated	
2014	Primetime Emmy Award for Outstanding Main Title Theme Music	Sleepy Hollow	Nominated	
2022	Primetime Emmy Award for Outstanding Music Composition for a Limited or Anthology Series, Movie or Special (Original Dramatic Score)	1883: 1883	Nominated	

== See also ==
- Music of the Marvel Cinematic Universe
