= Tawny Ellis =

American film producer

Tawny Marie Ellis (born December 25, 1981, in Los Angeles, California) is an American film producer and daughter of stuntman-turned-director David R. Ellis.

== Biography ==
Born to parents who were both stunt people, Tawny Ellis was raised in Mammoth Lakes, California. She was a ski racer from a very young age. Ellis then returned to the LA area and moved in with her father in Malibu, where she took up volleyball.

After graduating high school Ellis tried a year of junior college. She then worked a little on The Matrix Reloaded with her father, who was now a director. Her father, David Ellis, asked her to join his crew for his next film, Final Destination 2 (2003), in the Executive Assistant capacity. She left for her first location in Vancouver, Canada. Working a year on that picture fueled an interest in the creative world of film making for her. With David's next picture, she was promoted to Associate Producer and is now beginning what she hopes will be a very long, creative and lucrative career. She married stuntman Oakley Lehman on August 12, 2006. Her most recent project, The Final Destination, was released August 28, 2009.

== Filmography ==
- Final Destination 2 (2003) (Assistant Director)
- The Drew Carey Show (2003) (Cast)
- Bits and Pieces: Bringing Death to Life (2003) (Special Thanks)
- Cellular (2004) (Associate Producer)
- Dialing Up 'Cellular' (2004) (Associate Producer)
- Snakes on a Plane (2006) (Associate Producer)
- Pure Venom: The Making of 'Snakes on a Plane' (2006) (Associate Producer/Cast)
- Asylum (2007) (co-producer)
- Shakers (2007) (co-producer)
- The Final Destination (2009 (co-producer)
- Six Days Till Midnight (2010) (co-producer)
- The Hunted (2010) (In Development)
