= Harry Lowell =

American film producer

- Born: Harry Jason Lowell; December 12, 1971; Chicago, Illinois, US
- Occupation(s): television and film producer

Harry Jason Lowell (born December 12, 1971) is an American television and feature film producer. He is best known for producing television episodes of "Alaskan Steel Men", Modern Marvels and the feature film Locked In starring Ben Barnes, Eliza Dushku and Sarah Roemer.

== Bio ==
Harry Lowell was born in Chicago, Illinois and began his television career as a broadcast producer with advertising agencies including Crispin Porter + Bogusky, Interpublic Group of Companies and The Garage.

Lowell is a member of the Academy of Television Arts & Sciences and has won numerous awards for his work including a Clio Award, Chicago International Film Festival Award and a London Advertising Award.
