= Sarah Roemer =

American actress (born 1984)

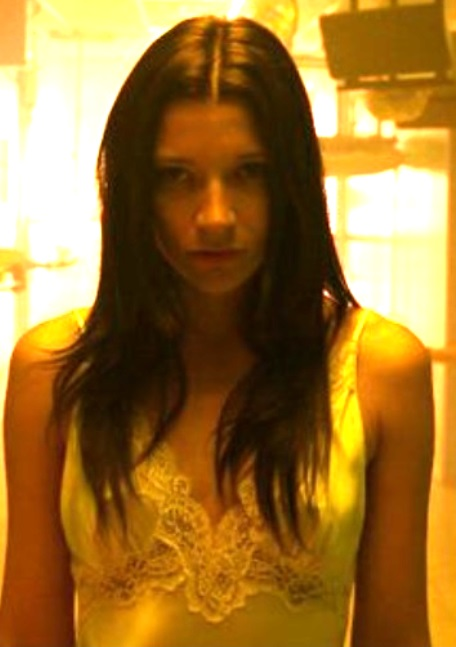
- Roemer in Waking Madison (2011)
- Born: Sarah Christine Roemer; August 28, 1984 (age 42); San Diego, California, U.S.
- Occupation: Actress
- Years active: 2006–present (actress); 2000–present (model)
- Spouse: Chad Michael Murray (m. 2015)
- Children: 3

Sarah Christine Roemer (born August 28, 1984) is an American actress. One of her best-known roles was a supporting character in Disturbia, and she has also starred in a number of films including Asylum, Hachi: A Dog's Tale, Fired Up!, Waking Madison, and The Con Artist, as well as the television series The Event and Chosen.

== Early life ==
Roemer was born on August 28, 1984, in San Diego, California. At the age of 15 she was recruited by a modeling agency while at 7-Eleven. She attended Horizon Junior and Senior High School and relocated to Los Angeles and started her modeling career.

== Career ==
Roemer signed with ID Model Management in New York City. She has modeled for GQ, Cosmopolitan, Maxim, Esquire, Nylon Guys, Self, Interview, Flaunt. She was featured in the Sportswear International magazine's cover model in its summer 2004 issue.

Her screen debut was in an indie film called Wristcutters: A Love Story. In the 2006 horror film The Grudge 2 she portrays Lacey Kimble, a high school student and young cheerleader. Released on October 13, 2006, to negative reviews, the film was a box office success. In 2007, Roemer starred alongside Shia LaBeouf in the Paramount Pictures thriller film Disturbia. She portrayed Ashley Carlson, a love interest and neighbor of LaBeouf's character. Disturbia was released on April 13, 2007, to a positive critical reception and debuting at number one in its first week at the box office. The film grossed $117.8 million against a budget of $20 million. She also starred alongside Dakota Fanning, Kristen Stewart and Virginia Madsen in the Kate Hudson–directed short film Cutlass.

In 2008, she starred alongside Travis Van Winkle and Ellen Hollman in Asylum. Directed by David Ellis, the film was released straight-to-DVD on July 15, 2008. Roemer appeared in the 2009 teen comedy film Fired Up. Also in 2009, Roemer portrayed Andy Wilson, the daughter of Richard Gere's character Parker Wilson, in the American drama film Hachi: A Dog's Tale. An American adaptation of the 1987 Japanese film Hachikō Monogatari. In 2009, she also starred in the independent film Falling Up, released straight-to-DVD. Roemer appeared in the music video for "Come Back to Me" by American Idol contestant David Cook.

On September 11, 2010, she portrayed Emma Sawyer in the independent thriller film Locked In. She also served as an associate producer in the film. Roemer portrayed central character Madison Walker in the independent drama Waking Madison, and as Kristen in the 2010 independent romantic comedy film The Con Artist. Later that year, Roemer starred in the NBC drama series The Event, portraying Leila Buchanan. The series concluded on May 13, 2011.

== Personal life ==
Roemer began dating her Chosen co-star Chad Michael Murray in 2014. In January 2015, it was announced that she and Murray had married. They have three children: a son born in 2015, and two daughters, born in 2017 and 2023.

== Filmography ==
=== Film ===
Year	Title	Role	Notes
2006	Wristcutters: A Love Story	Rachel	
2006	The Grudge 2	Lacey Kimble	
2007	Disturbia	Ashley Carlson	Nominated—MTV Movie Award for Best Kiss (shared with Shia LaBeouf)
2007	Cutlass	Eve	Short film
2008	Asylum	Madison	
2009	Fired Up!	Carly Davidson	
2009	Hachi: A Dog's Tale	Andy Wilson	
2009	Falling Up	Scarlett Dowling	
2010	Waking Madison	Madison Walker	
2010	Locked In	Emma Sawyer	Also as associate producer
2010	The Con Artist	Kristen	
2016	Manhattan Undying	Vivian	
2020	Algorithm: Bliss	Elizabeth	
2021	Survive the Game	Hannah	

=== Television ===
Year	Title	Role	Notes
2010–2011	The Event	Leila Buchanan	Main role
2011	Hawaii Five-0	Marissa Garcia	Episode: "Kame'e"
2012	Daybreak	Sarah	Episodes: "Chapter 1", "Chapter 4", "Chapter 5"
2013–2014	Chosen	Avery Sharp	Main role
2019	Deadly Hollywood Obsession (also known as Famous and Fatal)	Casey Wright	Television film
