= Bloodwork (film) =

- Theaterical film poster
- Directed by: Eric Wostenberg
- Written by: David Nahmodan
- Produced by: David S. Ward; Brandon Nutt; Chris Chesser; Karen Glasser; Ken Locsmandi
- Starring: Travis Van Winkle; Tricia Helfer; Mircea Monroe
- Cinematography: Vinit Borrison
- Edited by: Olena Kuhtaryeva
- Music by: Lee Sanders
- Distributed by: IFC Films
- Release date: May 10, 2012 (Netherlands)
- Countries: Canada; United States
- Language: English
- Budget: $3 million
- Box office: $12,345,456

Bloodwork (also known as Bloodworx in the United States and The Last Experiment in the United Kingdom) is a 2012 Canadian-American thriller film directed by Eric Wostenberg and written by David Nahmod. The film stars Travis Van Winkle, Tricia Helfer, and Mircea Monroe. The production was filmed in Canada under the working title Phase One, in November and December 2009.

== Plot ==
Two college students — irresponsible slacker Greg (Travis Van Winkle) and his straightlaced best friend Rob (John Bregar) — decide to take a trip to Europe for their spring break. Lacking in money, they research odd jobs and find an opportunity with Ravexin Pharmaceuticals to participate in a two-week trial for the company's new allergy drug. When they travel to the unexpectedly run-down, remote facility where the test is to take place, they are troubled by the stringent rules in place but enroll in the trial anyway, as it will earn them each over three thousand dollars.

Greg and Rob meet Dr. Wilcox (Tricia Helfer) and become acquainted with some of the other patients, including prudish Stacey (Mircea Monroe) and veteran trial participant Nigel (Rik Denton). The patients are given the first dose of the drug, RXZ-19; though they experience violent bowel movements as a result of taking the drug, the test soon begins to take a turn for the better, as the patients start to exhibit remarkable recovery from illness and injury. However, strange circumstances begin to occur, such as the discovery of worms and insects in the food served to the patients and infestations in the building. Despite the seemingly grotesque events happening around them, none of the trial participants seem to display any reaction to them, save for Greg. Greg confronts Wilcox in her lab and learns the truth about the trial: RXZ-19 is not an allergy drug, but a formula designed to give its users regenerative abilities, and the trials are being sponsored by the government. Greg is experiencing normal reactions to the facility's conditions because he is the control in the experiment, while the others are losing some of their inhibition and sense of self-preservation due to their newfound immunity. Outraged, Greg attempts to rally the others to rebel against Wilcox, but she convinces them to stay by increasing the payment to $8,000.

Wilcox's superiors learn of the encouraging results so far and push her to extend the trial further beyond her original intentions. While administering additional doses to Rob, increasing his regenerative abilities to a degree that he heals from a normally fatal neck wound almost instantly, he escapes from his restraints and attempts to rape Wilcox before being subdued by her assistants. Seeing that the patients are becoming zombie-like as their dependence on RXZ-19 increases, Dr. Wilcox has a crisis of conscience and decides to pull the plug on her experiment. She has Rob brought back in for detoxification, but before she can begin the process on any of the others, the facility's power is cut in a storm. The patients rebel en masse, desperate for more of the drug. They begin killing the staff and corner Wilcox in her lab to demand more, but when she runs out, they attack and mortally wound her. Greg escapes from his room and finds Wilcox dying, along with evidence that the patients have begun turning to cannibalism in their need to sate their addiction to RXZ-19. He comes across Aaron (Joe Pingue), the facility's phlebotomist, frantically packing up records. The pair escape the facility, but when Greg overhears Aaron contacting his superiors to tell them of the chaos, he forces Aaron to return to the facility so he can retrieve Rob.

Greg arms himself with a fire axe and searches through the facility for Rob, having to kill Stacey when she attacks him. Meanwhile, Aaron's superior (Eric Roberts) arrives with a military unit to purge the facility and its victims to cover up the government's actions. After hearing Aaron's report, his superior has him strangled to death. Greg finds Rob, whose detox was successful in restoring him to his true self, leaving him traumatized by his actions while on the drug. They are forced to work together and kill Nigel when he discovers them, and barely escape before the military unit sets off explosives, destroying the facility.

The next morning, Greg and Rob wander aimlessly through the forest until they discover a road. A car stops for them, driven by Aaron, who survived his injuries. Aaron retrieves a blanket from his trunk for them, but they do not see that his hand begins trembling uncontrollably, prompting him to take a dose of RXZ-19. As they ride, Greg and Rob realize Aaron is driving in the wrong direction from the nearest town. Aaron locks the doors of the car and warns the pair that there are events much bigger than them taking place as they realize that their nightmare is not over.

== Cast ==
(in order of appearance)

- Travis Van Winkle as Greg
- John Bregar as Rob Jeffries
- Tricia Helfer as Dr. Wilcox
- James Purcell as Taylor
- Yanna McIntosh as Patricia
- Sterling Jarvis as Curtis
- Rik Young as Nigel Denton
- Mircea Monroe as Stacey
- Tamara Feldman as Linnea
- Vas Saranga as Binal
- Albert Chung as Huy Lee
- Ardon Bess as Martel
- Anna Ferguson as Maggie
- Stephen Bogaert as Ira
- Joe Pingue as Aaron
- Brad Givoque as Special Ops Commander
- Eric Roberts as Man in Suit

== Distribution ==
Bloodwork was released on DVD in the Netherlands and Japan in 2012, and Blu-ray in Germany in July 2013. The film was also released on DVD in 2014; as The Last Experiment (UK) in March, and as Bloodworx (US) in October.
