= The Con Artist =

2010 film by Risa Bramon Garcia

- Film poster
- Directed by: Risa Bramon Garcia
- Written by: Michael Melski; Collin Friesen
- Produced by: Paul Barkin; Larissa Giroux
- Starring: Rossif Sutherland; Rebecca Romijn; Donald Sutherland; Sarah Roemer
- Cinematography: Derek Rogers
- Production companies: Alcina Pictures; Myriad Pictures
- Distributed by: Maple Pictures
- Release date: November 25, 2010 (Canada)
- Running time: 87 minutes
- Country: Canada
- Language: English

The Con Artist is a 2010 Canadian romantic crime comedy film directed by Risa Bramon Garcia and written by Michael Melski and Collin Friesen, starring Rossif Sutherland, Rebecca Romijn, Sarah Roemer, and Donald Sutherland. The film was released straight-to-DVD in the United States on June 14, 2011.

Production companies are Myriad Pictures and Alcina Pictures, in association with Telefilm Canada and the Ontario Media Development Corporation.

== Plot ==
When Vince is paroled after five years in prison for a heist gone wrong, his dangerous and controlling former boss, Kranski, forces him back into a life of crime. Working for Kranski as a car thief, Vince finds solace in welding sculptures out of metal and old car parts in Kranski’s chop shop. When Vince’s raw and evocative sculptures are discovered by calculating art dealer Belinda, his chance for a new life as an artist emerges. However, romantic complications arise with Belinda’s gallery assistant, Kristen. Caught between the pressure from Kranski and the demands of the art world, Vince must cleverly navigate his way out to become his own man, and his own artist.

== Cast ==
- Rossif Sutherland as Vince Dorian
- Rebecca Romijn as Belinda Bloom
- Donald Sutherland as John Kranski
- Sarah Roemer as Kristen
- Russell Peters as Pogue
- Cory Lee as Daphane
- Pedro Miguel Arce as Dorian
- Mac Fyfe as Dean
- Jed Rees as Larry
- Terra Vnesa as Amber
- Joel Hynes as Carl

== Production ==
The Con Artist was originally titled The Love Child of Andy Warhol and Yoko Ono, but by the time filming began in Toronto, the name was shortened to The Love Child. After being cast in the lead role, Rossif passed the script on to his father, Donald, who liked it enough to join the cast. Principle filming was underway by April 2009, and had wrapped by late July 2009. By January 2010, the title had become The Con Artist.
