= Last Call (2012 film) =

- Film poster
- Directed by: Greg Garthe
- Written by: Erik Lindsay; Scott Donnelly
- Produced by: Spence Jackson
- Starring: Travis Van Winkle; Ryan Hansen; Tara Reid; Diora Baird; Christopher Lloyd; Tom Arnold; Dave Foley
- Cinematography: Tyler Allison
- Edited by: Lance Chapman
- Music by: Michael Hebert
- Production company: Mineola Films
- Distributed by: Eagle Films
- Release date: April 12, 2012 (Sonoma International Film Festival)
- Country: United States
- Language: English

Last Call is a 2012 American independent comedy film and the directorial debut of Greg Garthe. The film stars Travis Van Winkle, Ryan Hansen, Tara Reid, Diora Baird, Clint Howard, David DeLuise, Richard Riehle, John Capodice, Dave Foley, Tom Arnold, and Christopher Lloyd. Filming began in Los Angeles in August 2009.

== Plot ==
Two underachieving cousins, Danny (Van Winkle) and Phil (Hansen) have to prove themselves when they are charged with managing the family pub, in a bid to save their wayward uncle from prison and financial ruin.

== Cast ==
- Travis Van Winkle as Danny
- Ryan Hansen as Phil
- Tara Reid as Lindsay
- Diora Baird as Janine
- Clint Howard as George
- David DeLuise as Mike
- Richard Riehle as Harold
- Tom Arnold as Gabe
- Dave Foley as Mr. Nunley
- Christopher Lloyd as Pete
- Phil Hendrie as Mulvahill
- Cutter Garcia as Joe
- Carrot Top as Mailman
- John Capodice as JoJo

== Production ==
Filming began in Los Angeles in August 2009.

== Release ==
The film was scheduled to be screened at the 16th annual Sonoma International Film Festival in April 2012.
