= The Event =

2010 American science fiction television series

- Genre: Drama; Thriller; Mystery; Science fiction
- Created by: Nick Wauters
- Starring: Jason Ritter; Sarah Roemer; Laura Innes; Ian Anthony Dale; Scott Patterson; Taylor Cole; Lisa Vidal; Bill Smitrovich; Clifton Collins, Jr.; Željko Ivanek; Blair Underwood
- Composer: Scott Starrett
- Country of origin: United States
- Original language: English
- No. of seasons: 1
- No. of episodes: 22

Production
- Executive producers: Evan Katz; Steve Stark; Jeffrey Reiner
- Running time: 43 minutes
- Production companies: Universal Media Studios; Steve Stark Productions; Open 4 Business Productions

Original release
- Network: NBC
- Release: September 20, 2010 – May 23, 2011

The Event (stylized as THE EVƎNT) is an American television series containing elements of science fiction, action/adventure and political allegory. It was created by Nick Wauters and aired on NBC from September 20, 2010, to May 23, 2011. The plot centers on a group of extraterrestrials, some of whom have been detained by the United States government for sixty-six years since their ship crashed in Alaska, while others have secretly assimilated among the general populace. The series was picked up for a full first season of 22 episodes on October 18, 2010. On May 13, 2011, NBC canceled the series after one season.

== Synopsis ==
=== Overview ===
Near the end of World War II, a craft of undetermined origin crashes in the Brooks Range of northern Alaska. It carries passengers who appear outwardly human, but are eventually determined to be of extraterrestrial origin. Their DNA is slightly less than one percent different from humans, and they age at a much slower rate. Since ninety-seven captured survivors refused to disclose information to the US, they were held in a nearby government facility, located on fictional Mount Inostranka. The remaining survivors, also known as the Sleepers, are able to escape the crash scene, as they, unlike those who were captured, sustained only minor injuries. Those who escape end up hiding among the regular populace.

In the present day, U.S. President Martinez learns of the facility's existence shortly after his inauguration and decides, after meeting the leader of the detainees, to release them and disclose their existence to the world, despite the objections of the intelligence agencies. His plans are put on hold when an assassination attempt on him is foiled by means beyond human technology. The CIA realizes there are other extraterrestrials and secretly plans to find and detain them. Unknown to the agency, the agent chosen to head the effort is himself one of those extraterrestrials. The escaped extraterrestrials, upon learning of the CIA's plans, have mixed reactions: some want to try to salvage attempts to peacefully assimilate, while others want to fight against the populace.

Caught in the middle of these events is Sean Walker, whose plans to propose to his girlfriend Leila on a Caribbean cruise are cut short when she mysteriously disappears from the ship. His investigation eventually leads him to uncover the assassination plot.

==== Narrative technique ====
The show's pilot episode is told almost entirely in retroversions to three different time frames. According to Nick Wauters, the show's creator, later episodes would use flashbacks more to develop the characters. "There will be big reveals and big clues in each episode," he said, promising that viewers would not have to wait too long for answers to questions raised. After the pilot aired, he and executive producer Steve Stark answered some viewer questions on their Twitter feeds, one being the fate of the plane used in the assassination attempt, which ended up disappearing through a portal before it could crash. The characters also have Twitter feeds, and one had a blog, truthseeker5314.com, which would reveal additional information. The last two episodes before and all episodes following the show's hiatus no longer featured flashbacks. Cast member Blair Underwood said regarding the removal of the flashbacks, "We had been jumping around a lot and doing flashbacks and that was confusing to people," and "So when we come back, that device is done with! We are now telling the story straight through so people can track it and follow it easier."

== Cast ==
=== Main cast ===
- Jason Ritter as Sean Walker – a software engineer who becomes involved in a government conspiracy when his would-be fiancée, Leila, mysteriously disappears during their Caribbean cruise. Sean later finds Leila and the two begin to uncover the conspiracy.
- Sarah Roemer as Leila Buchanan – Sean's girlfriend, who is kidnapped. After being rescued, she tries to find her younger sister who has also been kidnapped. It is revealed that she and her little sister are half non-terrestrial as their father, Michael Buchanan, was one of the survivors of the 1944 crash.
- Laura Innes as Sophia Maguire – the leader of a mysterious extraterrestrial group of detainees being held at the top-secret facility. She becomes a critical liaison to the President of the United States amidst the cover-up.
- Blair Underwood as Elias Martinez – the recently elected President of the United States, who is stunned to learn that his own government is keeping secrets from him. As he tries to do right by the public, he soon finds himself in the midst of the cover-up, and the target of an assassination attempt.
- Ian Anthony Dale as Simon Lee – a CIA operative and an extraterrestrial who was stationed at Mount Inostranka.
- Scott Patterson as Michael Buchanan – Leila's father, who is thrown into the conspiracy and must go through great lengths to protect his family. He is later revealed to be one of the non-terrestrials that survived the 1944 crash. He is shot and killed by a number of Sophia's people while trying to help Leila and Simon escape.
- Lisa Vidal as Christina Martinez – the First Lady of the United States. In the final episode, it is revealed that the First Lady is one of the "Sleepers" as she calls the planet entering Earth's orbit "Home".
- Bill Smitrovich as Raymond Jarvis – the opposition party Vice President of the United States who is revealed to be involved in the conspiracy. He was later named acting president while Martinez was incapacitated in hospital.
- Clifton Collins, Jr. as Thomas – a member of the non-terrestrials who escaped capture, but now is in contact with the other "Sleepers" who are not imprisoned. He is Sophia's son, and is much more militant than she. He is killed by a Hellfire missile launched from an Apache helicopter in a strike ordered by President Martinez.
- Željko Ivanek as Blake Sterling – the Director of National Intelligence, who has long kept secrets from the President. He was fired by Jarvis when he questioned Jarvis's involvement in Martinez's poisoning, but later reinstated after Martinez recovered.
- Taylor Cole as Vicky Roberts – a woman who Sean and Leila meet while on a cruise. She is later revealed to be an assassin who formerly worked for the CIA. Vicky kidnaps Leila in an attempt to draw Sean out. She fosters a child she orphaned after participating in a mission where she assassinated the child's family.

=== Recurring cast ===
- Heather McComb as Agent Angela Collier – an FBI agent that was involved in the arrest of Sean Walker. Initially, Walker's claims of the series of events that lead to Leila's disappearance seem delusional to Collier, but after witnessing her coworkers and friends get killed by the people who are after Sean, she becomes entangled with Walker as the truth unravels.
- D. B. Sweeney as Carter – an assassin who worked alongside Vicky to hold Leila.
- Hal Holbrook as James Dempsey – an elderly and powerful businessman who is the head of the vast conspiracy to cover up the existence of the aliens. He gives orders to Vicky and Carter and has a private army of innumerable assassins to carry out his orders. He is revealed to have the ability to shift to a younger version of himself. He is a part of an ancient sub-human race that has been fighting the aliens for three millennia. To motivate Sean to take on Sophia, he kills himself.
- Scott Michael Campbell as Justin Murphy – an agent working for the Office of Director of National Intelligence who is set up by undercover agents to appear as the traitor in the government who helped Sophia escape.
- Necar Zadegan as Isabel – an alien who is in a relationship with Thomas and supports his own agenda against Sophia. She is killed along with Thomas when Martinez fires a missile on the bus she and Thomas were on.
- Clea DuVall as Maya – an extraterrestrial who killed her boyfriend William for telling Sterling secrets about the detainees. She was later shot and killed by Thomas while trying to protect Sterling.
- Roger Bart as Richard Peel – the White House Chief of Staff.

== Development and production ==
Producer Steve Stark brought the original script to NBC in 2009, after hearing that the network was looking for an "event-type" series to add to its television lineup. The script was written by Nick Wauters in 2006. The show appeared on NBC's development slate in early January 2010, when the network announced at the Television Critics Association presentation that it had green-lit production of a pilot episode.

Casting announcements began in early February, with Jason Ritter landing the lead role of Sean Walker. In late February, Željko Ivanek was cast as Blake Sterling, and Ian Anthony Dale signed on as Simon Lee. This was followed a few days later by the addition of Scott Patterson and Sarah Roemer to the cast. Roemer was cast as Sean's girlfriend, Leila Buchanan, with Patterson portraying her father, Michael. In late February, Laura Innes was cast as Sophia Maguire, a role which was originally envisioned as male. Blair Underwood came on board in early March in the role of President Eli Martinez, a role which was originally planned for a Hispanic actor. Finally, the addition of Taylor Cole completed the main cast.

Jeffrey Reiner signed on to direct, after having agreed to a deal with Universal Media Studios to work on new projects. He also served as an executive producer. After having read the pilot script, he called it a "page turner." Lisa Zwerling, who also signed a deal with UMS, served as a consulting producer.

On May 7, 2010, NBC announced that it had given a thirteen episode order for The Event, followed by the announcement that Evan Katz had signed as showrunner and executive producer. A week later, the network announced that the series would appear on the Fall 2010 television schedule, airing on Mondays at 9 pm. On October 18, 2010, NBC announced it ordered nine more episodes, giving the show a twenty-two-episode season.

In mid-July 2010 Clifton Collins, Jr. was cast as Thomas, a character described as "a key player in the show's secret conspiracy".

The series is a thriller, love story, and mystery with an element of science fiction. Unlike other well known series of the same genre, producers had promised timely answers to mysteries, with some answers provided as early as the upcoming episode. Executive producer Evan Katz stated that "everything is designed to answer questions so you're not frustrated or feeling like we're making it up as we go along" and the writers intended to keep the viewers guessing in a "fair way."

== Episodes ==
No.	Title	Directed by	Written by	Original release date	US viewers (millions)
1	"I Haven't Told You Everything"	Jeffrey Reiner	Nick Wauters	September 20, 2010 (NBC)	10.88
Sean Walker (Jason Ritter) unwittingly becomes involved in a mysterious conspiracy after his girlfriend Leila (Sarah Roemer) is abducted while they are on a cruise ship. Meanwhile, the US President Martinez (Blair Underwood) plans to shut down a top-secret detention center, Mount Inostranka, in Alaska and reveal a cover-up directly tied to its detainees and their mysterious leader, Sophia (Laura Innes), despite the objections of the Director of National Intelligence Blake Sterling (Željko Ivanek). Sean boards a plane and pleads with the pilot, Leila's father Michael (Scott Patterson), not to crash it into the President's press conference in Miami. As the plane approaches the press conference site, it flies into a vortex in mid-air and vanishes.
2	"To Keep Us Safe"	Jeffrey Reiner	Evan Katz & Nick Wauters	September 27, 2010 (NBC)	9.06
The plane flies out of the vortex and crashes into a desert in Arizona. As a fleet of helicopters approaches the area, Michael urges Sean to run. A flashback shows Michael being captured as agents tell him that his two daughters (Leila included) were kidnapped by a group of mysterious individuals, one of whom includes Vicky Roberts (Taylor Cole), whom Sean and Leila met on a Caribbean cruise. Michael is told that his daughters will be killed if he does not cooperate with the assassination plot. In the present, Sean eventually collapses in the desert but is found and taken to a hospital in Yuma. Shortly thereafter, he is apprehended by FBI agents on a warrant for a murder that occurred on the cruise ship (conducted by the assailants who kidnapped Leila). Meanwhile, it is revealed the 97 detainees are a humanoid extraterrestrial species with enhanced lifespans who crash-landed in Alaska in 1944 from a UFO spaceship. Mount Inostranka was constructed to hold them, but many were not captured, as they fled their crash site and began to live among human society all over the world. Director Sterling appoints CIA operative Simon Lee (Ian Anthony Dale) to find the individuals, but Sterling does not know that Lee himself is one of the undiscovered aliens. Lee and a group of soldiers visit the crash site in Arizona and find all the passengers of the plane dead.
3	"Protect Them from the Truth"	Jeffrey Reiner	David H. Goodman & James Wong	October 4, 2010 (NBC)	7.56
Sean is taken into custody by FBI agents Hobbs and Collier in Yuma, while trying to convince them his story about Leila's abduction and of the plane flying into a vortex is true. He is able to escape after a vehicle accident, taking Agent Collier (Heather McComb) to a motel. Parts of Sean's story make sense to Collier, and she discovers that Vicky Roberts has multiple identities. Men posing as federal officials attempt to transfer Sean from Yuma to Washington, D.C., but open fire in the building; Sean escapes with Agent Collier. Meanwhile, when Sophia refuses to reveal the identity of those responsible for the Avias 514 incident, President Martinez offers freedom to any Inostranka detainee that can provide him with details. One named William (Omid Abtahi) comes forward. William demands that they also release his girlfriend, Maya (Clea DuVall), and when they are reunited, Maya stabs William to prevent him from talking. The military gathers the victims of the plane crash who were thought dead, but mysteriously awaken. Leila is kept tied up, with her mouth taped shut by her captors.
4	"A Matter of Life and Death"	John Badham	David Schulner & Lisa Zwerling	October 11, 2010 (NBC)	6.50
Sean and Agent Collier escape from a shootout at the Yuma office. Their search for Leila leads them to Texas, where they find Vicky Roberts' mother but not Leila. Sean meets Vicky's son, who asks him to take his picture to show to his mother. Sean takes his picture with his cellphone. Meanwhile, Sterling interrogates Michael about the people who kidnapped his family and made him fly the plane. A mysterious man, named Thomas (Clifton Collins, Jr.), calls President Martinez to demand that the detainees be released or innocent people will die. Martinez and his wife Christina (Lisa Vidal) meet with Sophia in an attempt to get her to open up about the airplane. The passengers of the Avias 514 awaken, but they cannot recall anything that happened and exhibit different illnesses. Leila manages to escape from her captors and tries to contact Sean. The escape was set up by Vicky so that Leila would contact Sean, and Vicky could track Leila to Sean's location then and capture him.
5	"Casualties of War"	Milan Cheylov	Dan Dworkin & Jay Beattie	October 18, 2010 (NBC)	6.42
Thomas contacts President Martinez again to offer an ultimatum. Thomas will provide an antidote for the passengers of Avias 514, who are slowly dying from a mysterious illness. In exchange, though, President Martinez must release all the Inostranka detainees. Sophia and Agent Lee try to convince Thomas to back down on his demands, when they learn that President will execute the detainees if the passengers of Avias 514 die. Meanwhile, Sean is able to contact Leila, but she discovers the police are involved in her kidnapping and fails to escape. When Sean arrives and discovers Vicky is inside the station, he threatens to expose the young boy she has been harboring from a previous mission against the orders of her superiors. Vicky then helps Sean escape with Leila. The episode closes with Martinez agreeing to trade Sophia for the antidote.
6	"Loyalty"	Jonas Pate	Leyani Diaz & Vanessa Rojas	October 25, 2010 (NBC)	5.97
Lee's cover within the Government is blown as he helps Sophia escape. Meanwhile, Sean tries to explain the plane and conspiracy to Leila, who learns that her mother is dead and her little sister is still missing. Carter, the kidnapper they have taken captive, reveals that her father, Michael, may have known something about the events. Sean and Leila return to Leila's home and find a woman called Madeline, a paranoid former journalist, who claims she and Michael were aware of the detention center and detainees at Mount Inostranka. Meanwhile, Sterling and President Martinez continue to track Sophia, though they know that someone in Lee's team is involved (not knowing that it is Lee himself). Flashbacks show that Lee was in love with a woman named Violet in 1954, but because of his slow aging, Thomas forced him to leave her. They met again half-century later during the 1990s in Washington, D.C. before she died of old age. The team manages to track Sophia and Thomas to a warehouse and moves in to capture them, but Thomas mysteriously causes the building to implode leaving Lee trapped under the rubble of the building.
7	"I Know Who You Are"	Milan Cheylov	Evan Katz & Lisa Zwerling	November 8, 2010 (NBC)	5.54
Thomas reveals himself as Sophia's son as he apologizes for failing to do what Sophia had wanted. Sterling begins to question whether Lee is trustworthy when Agent Murphy claims that Lee is working with Sophia and Thomas. Murphy is set up to look like the mole by another sleeper. Meanwhile, Sean, Leila, and Madeline find a list within Michael's top secret files containing the names of 13 people that seem to be the names of females and codes on the bottom of the paper. With the help of Madeline's computer hacker friend, they discover that the names are girls who have disappeared recently. Suddenly, a group of assassins attack the house and Sean and Leila escape but Madeline and the man who cracked the codes are nowhere to be seen after the house is blown up. Also, a woman is shown taking Leila's younger sister, Samantha, down a hallway and then into a room. The room contains what seems to be a playroom with young girls having faces resembling old women.
8	"For the Good of Our Country"	Jeffrey Reiner	David H. Goodman & James Wong	November 15, 2010 (NBC)	5.64
Martinez interrogates Michael as he reveals the people who wanted him to do the assassination attempt were going to call it off, but a call from someone told them to go through with it. He also reveals the call was made mere minutes after a meeting Martinez had about the press conference. After looking through phone records, they discover Raymond Jarvis (Bill Smitrovich), the vice-president, was in on the attempt. Meanwhile, Sean is shot by one of the assassins who survived the explosion, forcing Leila to kidnap a doctor to perform surgery on him. Elsewhere, Vicky is ordered by Dempsey (Hal Holbrook) to kill Jarvis, however she lets him live and tells him to confess. The men sent out by Martinez capture Jarvis, but before he could reveal who gave him orders, a car explosion goes off, apparently killing him. Dempsey is then shown looking in the mirror soon after taking medicine, his face shifting to a younger version of himself.
9	"Your World to Take"	Michelle MacLaren	Dan Dworkin & Jay Beattie	November 22, 2010 (NBC)	5.19
Sophia and Thomas move ahead with their plans getting all of their people back to their home planet, they are all assembled at a hotel meeting room. Sophia is now the head of the mission, feeling Thomas is not fit for the job. When Sophia announces her plan, she finds out that one of the heads of the factions does not want to return home and instead want to colonize Earth with their race. Thomas is secretly colluding with Isabel (Necar Zadegan), head of one of the factions and Thomas' romantic interest. Thomas reveals to Isabel that he will kill Sophia after she obtains the key to send them back home. Meanwhile, Sean and Leila meet up with Agent Collier who gives them information about a couple whose daughter was kidnapped by Dempsey's men. They arrive at the couple's residence in Los Angeles to get some kind of information on Leila's sister Samantha. It is revealed that the couple's daughter knew Samantha, but fearing for their safety, they refuse to allow their daughter to answer more of Sean and Leila's questions. Still determined for answers, Sean and Leila follow the family while Dempsey sends one of his men to hunt down Leila. Also, President Martinez and Sterling patiently wait as Jarvis heals from the car explosion. He later awakens and reveals to his wife of his actions. At the end, Thomas is unable to kill Sophia, with Sophia confronting Isabel about her betrayal. She then orders Isabel to shoot herself in the knee, which she does, as punishment for her actions, and to prove her loyalty to Sophia.
10	"Everything Will Change"	Norberto Barba	David Schulner & Nick Wauters	November 29, 2010 (NBC)	5.83
Sean and Leila find the hospital that Samantha and the other girls were held captive, but everyone seems to have left. They also find a file containing information about Leila's father showing pictures indicating that he seems to have not have aged at all since the 1940s. Meanwhile, Sophia tells Lee that Thomas has a secret stash of money that is managed by a man named Stephen Grant. Lee decides that he will find and talk to Grant immediately but it is found that he had been killed by Thomas. Martinez and Sterling discover what at first seems to be a missile launched by Thomas headed straight toward the western side of the United States. They fear that it has a nuclear warhead on it, but it is then noticed that the U.S. is not the target for the missile and it seems to be heading into space. The missile turns out to be a communications satellite that is transmitting a message into space from Thomas and Isabel to the aliens' home planet.
11	"And Then There Were More"	Jeffrey Reiner	Story by : Leyani Diaz & Vanessa Rojas; Teleplay by : David H. Goodman	March 6, 2011 (Citytv); March 7, 2011 (NBC)	5.23
Thomas and an assault team of aliens set up a portal and plan to attack Inostranka to free the detainees. Meanwhile, a late Alaskan senator's wife (Virginia Madsen) succeeds her husband's Senate seat, and accidentally finds a classified file about Inostranka. Sterling plans to visit Inostranka to interrogate some prisoners, after the transmission from Thomas' satellite to outer space is decoded: "Preparations are being made for your arrival". In Los Angeles, Sean and Leila finally find and rescue Samantha and the kidnapped girls, and they're saved by Michael Buchanan (Leila's father) and Sophia. However, Leila, confirming that her father is an alien, must decide between going along with Sean or go with Sophia and Michael.
12	"Inostranka"	Jeffrey Reiner	Story by : David Schulner; Teleplay by : Dan Dworkin & Jay Beattie	March 6, 2011 (Citytv); March 7, 2011 (NBC)	5.23
At Inostranka, Sterling interrogates Maya, who insists that her people never intended to interfere with Earth's civilization. Sterling is not convinced by her argument and presses the interrogation. Meanwhile, Thomas manages to break into the Inostranka prison, killing 44 of the detainees loyal to Sophia and leaving with another 51 who would be loyal to him, and injures Sterling in the stomach and leg. Sterling narrowly escapes capture with the help of Maya, who still supports Sophia. While a senator's succeeding wife threatens to expose Inostranka on TV's Hardball with Chris Matthews, President Martinez stops her. Meanwhile, Michael finally tells Leila that he (an alien) is from NGC 253. Sean suddenly abandons Leila after she chooses to stand by her father.
13	"Turnabout"	Michael Waxman	James Wong	March 14, 2011 (NBC)	4.26
President Martinez gets tougher with dealing with the cleanup of Thomas's breakout of the 51 Inostranka detainees. Michael drops Lelia and Samantha off with a fellow alien family before he goes off to help Sophia stop Thomas. The 51 detainees and Thomas move into a suburban area, while Michael and Sophia detain one of them for questioning. Sophia informs President Martinez that she believes Thomas intends to steal uranium from a nuclear power plant to open a portal to their home planet, and that Thomas was responsible for the 1986 Chernobyl disaster. As the uranium is being moved to a more secure location under the supervision of Agent Lee, Thomas steals it. Martinez believes that Sophia has tricked him and orders her to be found and killed if necessary.
14	"A Message Back"	Norberto Barba	David H. Goodman & Nick Wauters	March 21, 2011 (NBC)	4.11
Vicky tells Sean about Dempsey, a powerful billionaire who has now mysteriously disappeared and is the one behind the whole conspiracy. Meanwhile, Vice President Jarvis is released from the hospital and plans to have a party at the Ambassador Hotel. Sean and Vicky disguise themselves as guests to get to Jarvis. He reveals that Dempsey recently left the United States for France. Meanwhile, Thomas receives a message from his home planet and sets up a meeting with the other sleepers. He calls Sophia while she is being watched by the covert military team dressed as local SWAT. She goes with Michael to the abandoned church in Los Angeles to meet with Thomas. Leila also goes by following the alien watching her. Martinez learns that if Sophia is at the meeting, it could be his chance to catch all of the sleepers. Thomas reveals that their home planet's sun has started going supernova, leaving their home uninhabitable in less than a year. They have no choice but to get all of their people to Earth in order to survive. The military surround the building, trapping everyone inside.
15	"Face Off"	Janusz Kamiński	David Schulner & Lisa Zwerling	March 28, 2011 (NBC)	4.53
Vicky and Sean escape the Secret Service and fly to France to try and catch Dempsey. In France, Dempsey has been funding a very expensive archaeology project. His workers have uncovered a cave with extremely old drawings that Dempsey says are of "guardian angels", which are in fact physical beings. Back in the United States, Martinez has the church with Sophia's people surrounded by assault teams. With no way out, Sophia and Thomas calls Gerard at the portal and asks him if he can transport them out of the church. When he replies that they do not even have enough uranium loaded for one person, Sophia asks what he does have enough for. Back in D.C., Martinez is about to order that all troops move in and kill Sophia's people when the situation room starts to vibrate as if there is an earthquake. As Martinez is rushed to a safe room, Sterling receives reports that the Washington Monument has completely collapsed. Martinez orders all troops to stand down. Sophia claims that they will keep destroying D.C. unless Martinez provides her with three buses to LAX and a plane, to which he obliges. While Sophia and the rest are on their way to LAX, Sterling finally realizes that Agent Lee is actually a 'sleeper' and the White House is able to crack the encryption code on a phone call he made to Sophia. The call reveals that they do not have enough fuel to do any more damage to Washington and her demands to Martinez were a bluff. An Apache helicopter is sent in and starts destroying the first bus. Thomas makes a phone call to Gerard who says he only has enough fuel loaded for one bus. Thomas sacrifices himself and his bus, while the third bus transporting Sophia, along with Michael and Leila, goes through the portal.
16	"You Bury Other Things Too"	Michael Waxman	Dan Dworkin & Jay Beattie	April 4, 2011 (NBC)	4.14
Sophia, Michael, Leila, and the other remaining sleeper aliens on their bus are transported to the same gated community Thomas once hid with his group. Agent Simon Lee gets a call from an unknown 'sleeper' that his calls are being wiretapped and must flee immediately to them. Sophia proposes that since life is currently unsustainable on their home planet, Thomas' plan should continue by letting more of her people come down to Earth, much to Simon's dismay. When Simon talks to Michael about Sophia's plan, he proposes they both go against the idea since it would result in genocide on innocent human beings. Instead, Michael informs Sophia of Simon's plan, has him promptly arrested and taken away. In France, Sean and Vicky follow the advice from a French acquaintance of hers to head to a chateau where Dempsey is, which turns out that the direction they took has no such place and are both ambushed. After a violent shootout, Vicky is apprehended, while Sean escapes. Vicky is then taken to Dempsey and explains to her that he comes from a long line of sentinel beings that defended against the 'sleepers' for countless years. He then orders his men to leave her for dead. Sean violently confronts the acquaintance, ties him up, and proceeds to beat his hands with a hammer. The acquaintance concedes and tells Sean of the address on where Dempsey's location is. Elsewhere, President Martinez personally confides to his own staff of Sophia and Lee's actions, so he gives a speech that in light of the recent events, the only way to assure themselves of any trouble is for the general public in the country (including staff and other personnel in the White House) to undergo a mandatory TB skin test, when it's actually a ruse to gather DNA of possible 'sleepers,' much to his wife's disapproval and leading Martinez to question himself about her reasons.
17	"Cut Off the Head"	Norberto Barba	Evan Katz & James Wong	April 18, 2011 (NBC)	3.85
Sophia sends some of her people to other parts of the globe to locate pieces of a weapon she would need in her plans. President Martinez becomes suspicious of his wife's refusal to take the DNA test. Vice President Jarvis meets Sophia with a proposition that could make him President, in exchange for having more of her people arrive on Earth. In France, Sean rescues Vicky and is confronted by Dempsey, who explains that he represents an ancient group, dedicated to protecting humanity from outsiders. He explains what is to come and that he believes that Sean is the one capable of stopping Sophia and her people. Sean refuses, telling Dempsey that his only goal will be to stop him and make him pay for his crimes. Dempsey approvingly agrees, but tells Sean that he will have to make sure that Sean refocuses his attention on Sophia. He then takes a pistol and commits suicide with a shot to his own head, leaving the shocked Sean with a bag containing the information Dempsey says he'll need in his quest. At the end, Leila manages to contact Sean using a stolen cell phone and informs him of Sophia's plan.
18	"Strain"	Michael Watkins	Dan Dworkin & Jay Beattie	April 25, 2011 (NBC)	4.62
Vice President Jarvis proceeds with Sophia's plan to make him President. Jarvis replaces President Martinez's sweetener with poison. President Martinez is rushed to the hospital after suffering a stroke, with a deteriorating condition. After being told by the President that Jarvis was behind the assassination attempt, Sterling secretly works with the president's chief-of-staff to stop Jarvis from becoming president. They view CCTV footage and see that the vice president quickly grabs the sweetener, to remove any evidence. Sterling then notices that a sample of the poison could still be in the carpet after the drink is spilt, but the carpet is cleaned after Jarvis realizes this as well on a phone call to Sophia. Meanwhile, Sean and Vicky travel to Murmansk, Russia, after receiving a tip from Leila that the sleepers are searching for a weapon in that area. In Murmansk, a scientist is extracting the weapon from a frozen body when he accidentally cuts himself and infects himself with the weapon. Sean and Vicky arrive in Murmansk and board the ship the scientists were working on, only to find that they are all dead. The only surviving crew member among the dead is then confronted by Sean and Vicky, who explains that the weapon has already been moved and is intended to be flown back to the United States. The weapon is a strain of the Spanish flu. At the same time, Michael confronts Leila over the call made using the stolen cell phone. He then kills Leila's handler as he is going to expose her to Sophia. A vote is held with the President's staff and Jarvis is made acting president. Sterling then realizes that the President's coffee spilled over his shirt, and he now has a sample of the poisoned drink. The President's condition worsens and he begins to seize.
19	"Us or Them"	Milan Cheylov	David H. Goodman	May 2, 2011 (NBC)	4.14
Vice President Jarvis has just been sworn in as acting president as Martinez lapses into a coma and his condition worsens. Meanwhile, Sean and Vicky board a plane headed back for the U.S. with the hopes of catching the virus but they arrive too late. Sterling is fired by Jarvis for questioning Jarvis' involvement with poisoning Martinez. Elsewhere, Michael helps Simon and Leila escape from the sleeper compound. Michael is killed while trying to protect Leila and Simon. Before dying, Michael gives Simon an antidote with the hopes it will cure Martinez. Simon escapes while Leila watches Michael die as Sophia and her troops arrive at the scene.
20	"One Will Live, One Will Die"	Alex Zakrzewski	David Schulner	May 9, 2011 (NBC)	3.85
Sean and Vicky are able to prevent the sleepers from releasing the virus into the air circulation system of a mall. However, one of the sleepers escapes and unleashes a portion of the virus onto a bus as a test of its virulence. From a video of the bus passengers' deaths, Sophia concludes that the virus kills humans too quickly, which would mean that it would be contained before it could spread across the world. As Sophia's people are completely immune, a hybrid - Leila - will be used to incubate a mutated strain. Meanwhile, Lee seeks Sterling's help to get the antidote to President Martinez. Jarvis sends men to stop them, but they escape. Hearing that Sterling contacted Christina, Jarvis tells the First Lady that Sterling poisoned her husband. Apparently convinced, Christina says that she was asked to meet Sterling and Lee secretly at an empty warehouse. Jarvis arranges for the warehouse to be destroyed with Sterling and Lee inside, ignoring the strong protests of his advisors. His men search the wreckage but find the targets have escaped through a tunnel. Christina injects the antidote into her husband, after discreetly receiving it from a disguised Lee at the hospital gift shop.
21	"The Beginning of the End"	Jonas Pate	Story by : Leyani Diaz & Vanessa Rojas; Teleplay by : Nick Wauters	May 16, 2011 (NBC)	4.07
Sean and Vicky follow the address on the identification of the sleeper they had killed. It ultimately leads them to a warehouse, where they come across both Sterling and Lee. The four of them team up and try to find the exact whereabouts of the other sleepers in the city. Meanwhile, President Martinez's vital signs begin to vastly improve, due to the antidote his wife Christina had managed to give him. He demands to head back to the White House immediately and stop the ones who conspired against him, despite still feeling somewhat weak from the poison's after effects. Martinez confronts Jarvis in a rage saying that poisoning him just to acquire his position as President and allowing Sophia to carry out her plan only risks the lives of innocent people, rather than bringing peace. Jarvis explains that to resume his role as President, Martinez must convince the cabinet of his good health. Sophia and one of the doctors beside her begin to notice Leila continuously in agony from the strain of Spanish flu in her body. The doctor concludes that although her sleeper-half is immune, her human immune system is constantly fighting and may take days or months for Leila to actually succumb to it. Sophia directs her people around the world to commence with their plan. Sean, Lee, Vicki, and Sterling manage to locate the hideout of the sleepers and capture and interrogate one of the female doctors, Dr. Lu. When she refuses to talk, Lee threatens to torture her with an electric drill until she finally reveals the password to their satellite link. Ultimately they discover that 'The Event' has truly begun. A massive portal into deep space opens...
22	"Arrival"	James Wong	Evan Katz	May 23, 2011 (NBC)	4.89
Sean tells a weakened Leila that Sterling has called someone at the CDC who will be able to help her recover. Leila has given up hope, but Sean begs her to fight the virus with all her might. Meanwhile, Sterling finds a report on Dr. Lu's computer that shows the rapid spread of the deadly pathogen to wipe out humanity. After careful research, Sterling learns that the Sleepers are depositing pressurized aerosol containers carrying the virus at three distinct locations (a food processing plant, the Bureau of Engraving, and Dulles Airport). Martinez presents the cabinet with crucial evidence that Jarvis was responsible for his illness in an assassination attempt. Jarvis is then arrested and removed from office and Martinez is restored as President. Special Forces teams take down the Sleepers at the food processing plant and at the engraving bureau. Sean, Vicky, Sterling, and Lee confront Sophia and her associates at Dulles Airport before they can release the virus. The sleepers who were attempting to release the virus are all killed, except for Sophia. Sean is able to convince her not to release the virus, saying that it will not help her situation and will only make things worse. Sophia surrenders to the military and humanity is saved. Afterwards, Vicky goes off on her own, while Lee tells Sean that the ancient scroll that Dempsey gave Sean explains all about the origins of the aliens as well as their plans. Sophia, now in custody once again, tells Martinez that despite her failure to destroy humanity there is no stopping the sleepers and the rest of her people from coming to Earth for it is already done. In her still weakened state, Leila tells Sean that she is pregnant. At the end, the portal succeeds in transporting the entire alien planet into Earth's orbit. Looking into the sky, the President's son asks his mother Christina: "What is it?" She replies: "Home"... suggesting that she too was a sleeper this entire time.

== Reception ==
=== Reviews ===
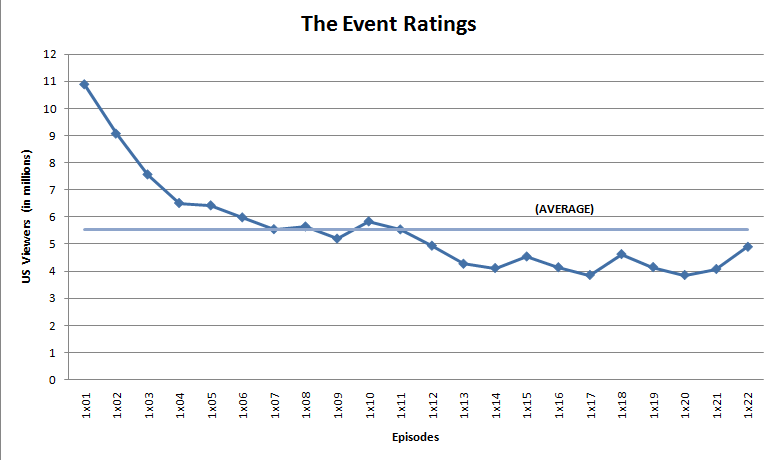
Ratings trend

The Event was one of four new series screened at San Diego Comic-Con in July 2010, with The Hollywood Reporter saying the crowd response suggested "NBC's fall drama The Event came up a big winner."

Reviews of the pilot episode were generally favorable, scoring 67 out of 100 on Metacritic, and invoking many comparisons to 24 (Evan Katz's other produced show) and Lost (another science fiction show), each of which had ended its run the preceding spring of 2010. Mary McNamara of the Los Angeles Times called it "as big, brash and promising as Heroes was a few years back". Variety's Brian Lowry called it "an enticing start". Linda Stasi of the New York Post stated that "if 24, Lost, and The 4400 had a baby, it would be The Event". Author Stephen King ranked The Event the fourth-best television series of 2010, calling it a "clever, suspenseful drama" and describing it as "24 crossbred with Lost".

Some more cautious commentators said the show had promise but could not go on tantalizing the audience with a proliferation of mysteries. "The effort required to follow the story", said Barry Garron of The Hollywood Reporter, "goes well beyond what most viewers might be willing to give." Ken Tucker of Entertainment Weekly called the pilot "an irritating tease" and hoped the second episode would answer some of the questions the pilot asked.

=== Ratings ===
The pilot episode received 10.88 million viewers and a 3.6/9 adults 18–49 rating/share, placing third in its timeslot at 9:00 pm ET. After averaging 9.1 million viewers for the first four episodes, NBC picked up the series for a full season.

However, by the final episode of 2010 on November 29, the series had cut its audience by 46% and its demo rating by 48%, to 5.83 million and a 1.9/5 respectively, although both of these were up noticeably from the previous week. On November 15, NBC announced that The Event would be going into hiatus after the November 29 episode, and would return on February 28, 2011 (later pushed back to March 7). Upon its return, the series received 5.23 million viewers and a then-series-low 1.4/4 18–49 rating/share; the latter of these figures represented a 26% plunge from the fall finale. The series had since gone as low as 3.85 million viewers and a 1.1/3 rating/share in 18–49, first on April 18 and again on May 9.

=== Awards ===
Ceremony	Category	Nominee(s)	Episode	Result
Image Awards	Outstanding Actor in a Drama Series	Blair Underwood		Nominated
Image Awards	Outstanding Writing in a Dramatic Series	Leyani Diaz, Vanessa Rojas	"Loyalty"	Nominated
Imagen Awards	Best Supporting Actor - Television	Clifton Collins Jr.		Nominated
Imagen Awards	Best Supporting Actress - Television	Lisa Vidal		Nominated
People's Choice Awards	Favorite New TV Drama			Nominated
Visual Effects Society	Outstanding Visual Effects in a Broadcast Series	Victor Scalise, Jason C. Spratt, Diego Galtieri, Michael Enriquez		Nominated
Visual Effects Society	Outstanding Created Environment in a Live Action Broadcast Program	Michael Cook, Jon Rosenthal, Ragui Hanna, Ryan Wieber	"To Keep Us Safe"	Nominated

== Home media ==
The complete series was released on DVD in region 1 on August 23, 2011, in region 2 on October 17, 2011 and in region 4 on August 24, 2011. Special features on the DVD include seven behind-the-scenes featurettes, six audio commentaries with cast and crew, deleted scenes, episode recaps, a photo gallery, and a never-before-seen look at Dempsey's back story.

The 5-disc Blu-ray edition of the series was released on June 6, 2023, in region 1.

== Broadcast ==
The Event has been syndicated for broadcast in several countries worldwide, including Canada where it aired simultaneously with the U.S., United Kingdom, Ireland, and New Zealand.

== Possible series continuation ==
After the series' cancellation, the Syfy channel had been rumored to be in talks to continue the series as a miniseries; this was later denied by Syfy's Craig Engler. At the 2011 Television Critics Association Tour, NBC chairman Robert Greenblatt revealed the possibility of a TV movie. He said, "It's been discussed with Syfy and a few weeks ago it seemed more possible than it does today, but I honestly don't know." If it were to happen, it would air on Syfy, and not NBC.
