= Waking Madison =

- Film poster
- Directed by: Katherine Brooks
- Written by: Katherine Brooks
- Produced by: Megan Ellison; Jonah Hirsch; Ted Schipper
- Starring: Sarah Roemer; Elisabeth Shue; Taryn Manning; Frances Conroy; Will Patton; Erin Kelly
- Music by: Klaus Badelt
- Production company: Annapurna Productions
- Distributed by: Entertainment One
- Release date: May 12, 2011 (Newport Beach Film Festival)
- Running time: 89 minutes
- Country: United States
- Language: English
- Budget: $2 million

Waking Madison (originally titled Mad World) is a 2011 American independent drama film written and directed by Katherine Brooks and starring Sarah Roemer and Elisabeth Shue.

The film was screened at the Newport Beach Film Festival, in Costa Mesa, California, on May 2, 2011. The film was released straight-to-DVD on July 12, 2011.

== Plot ==
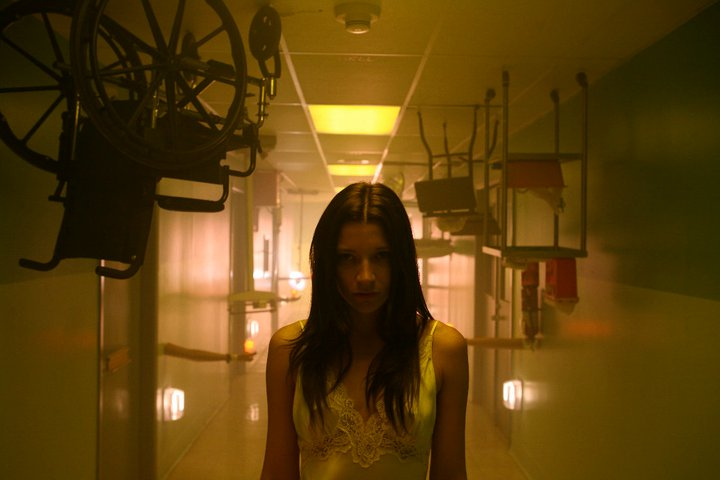
Sarah Roemer as Madison Walker in Waking Madison

Madison lives in New Orleans. Suicidal and desperate, she meets with Dr. Elizabeth Barnes, who videotapes each patient's interviews.

Dr. Barnes interviews Madison who confides that there is a little girl who she is not allowed to talk about, that someone will get mad and try to hurt her if she does. Dr. Barnes is not sure whom she is referring to.

Dr. Barnes interviews Alexis who says that her priest touched her, but her mother did not believe her. She wore a thorny crown on her head, slit her wrists and feet and said she tried to look like Jesus.

Dr. Barnes interviews Grace, who claims she was raped when she was 13 and the man killed himself. She tried to have an abortion when she was pregnant at 16, but had no money, the guy she got to do it messed up and now she is unable to have kids.

Dr. Barnes tries to interview aggressive Margaret, who does not want to do the interview. While strapped to the floor of a padded room, Margaret says that her mom forced her to read the Bible in the closet.

Madison did things she never would have done; had sex with strange men, smoked, took what looked like ecstasy and fooled around with women. When her landlord says Madison could pay the rent with sexual favors like before, Madison said she had no idea what he was talking about, so he got angry and ordered her to pay him with cash. She even did drugs by sticking a needle in her arm with the help of Grace.

Each patient—aside from Madison who was not there—was assigned to film herself with a video camera, talking about anything, like a visual diary, Margaret refused. Madison, however, locks herself in her apartment, using a video camera to document herself, similar to the girls in the mental hospital. Madison vows that if she does not have the answer to her questions and feel more at peace with her life, she will kill herself on the 30th day.

Oftentimes, Madison has various, frequent dreams; everything being upside down, a girl whose mouth is taped, and one hand reaches for her, walks through the hall with dripping water and weird light bulbs. She sees a reflection of herself in the mirror and imagines herself putting her head through it, yet a second later, the glass is intact. There was also a little blonde girl.

She also has what seems to be a flashback/memory of her mom abusing her; dunking her head over and over in the tub.

One minute, Madison gets mad whenever Dr. Barnes calls her by her name, saying that her name is not Madison. The next minute, Madison says that she does not remember what had happened just then. Madison or whomever said, "She called you. She is going to die. She is not real. I am real," and Madison went back to her old self.

Madison realizes that each girl that Dr. Barnes interviewed; Grace, Margaret and Alexis, happened to be her. She realized that she has dissociated personalities. Dr. Barnes gets a call from one of Madison's personalities who said, "Madison will die." This worries Dr. Barnes who goes to Madison's house and then goes into her room, seeing the notebook that Madison mentioned that she hid under her mattress. It is titled, "The Helper". She flipped through it and it has drawings of each girl, their names labeled underneath; Margaret, Alexis and Grace, and even the little blonde girl she calls "The helper".

Madison later realizes that Dr. Barnes did not exist either. That Dr. Barnes is a part of her like the others. Now that she realizes that, she can move on with her life and not think about killing herself like she thought of doing on the 30th day.

== Cast ==
- Sarah Roemer as Madison Walker, a young woman determined to find a cure for her mental illness
- Elisabeth Shue as Dr. Elizabeth Barnes, Madison's doctor
- Taryn Manning as Margaret, a fellow mental patient
- Erin Kelly as Grace, a fellow mental patient
- Frances Conroy as Dolly Walker, Madison's mother
- Will Patton as Mr. Walker
- Imogen Poots as Alexis
- McKinley Freeman as Henry

== Production ==
Filming took place in New Orleans starting on November 5, 2007.
