= Falling Up (film) =

- Directed by: David M. Rosenthal
- Written by: David M. Rosenthal; Joseph M. Smith
- Produced by: Joseph M. Smith
- Starring: Joseph Cross; Sarah Roemer; Snoop Dogg; Rachael Leigh Cook; Claudette Lali; Joe Pantoliano; Mimi Rogers; Annette O'Toole
- Cinematography: Joseph Gallagher
- Edited by: Conor O'Neill
- Music by: Mark Mothersbaugh
- Distributed by: Anchor Bay (US & UK); Gryphon (Australia)
- Release dates: September 29, 2009 (Australia); January 5, 2010 (United States)
- Running time: 98 minutes
- Country: United States
- Language: English

Falling Up (known in Australia as The Golden Door) is a 2009 American romantic comedy film that was released direct-to-video in late 2009 or early 2010 depending on region.

== Plot ==
Nursing student Henry O'Shea (Joseph Cross), who suddenly finds himself the 'head' of his family, after the death of his father, takes a leave from school to support his mother, getting a job as a New York doorman. As a former nursing student, Henry has occasion to help Scarlett (Sarah Roemer), a resident's daughter, with some difficult situations involving his medical knowledge. After Henry saves Scarlett's boyfriend from dying of an overdose, she takes him out to thank him for his help and they make a connection. Shortly after, Scarlett's mother (Mimi Rogers) happens to be going through Scarlett's digital camera, and finds pictures of them together. She immediately calls Henry's boss and has Henry fired.

When Scarlett finds out, she admonishes her mother and promises to date whomever she pleases, regardless of station in life. She attempts to find Henry, but is unsuccessful. Henry's sister Kate shows up in the lobby of the building and insists upon talking to Scarlett, who accompanies her for a walk in the city, and they discuss Henry's job and his future.

Meanwhile, Henry finds out his mother is working at a sex shop in the city. While he's freaking out about the job she chose, Scarlett shows up and tries to rekindle what they started on their date. Henry rejects her, saying she's too much for him because of her socioeconomic status in contrast to his.

Not long after, Henry is walking around the city lamenting his station in life and the dressing down he received from his mother regarding his attitude toward his own worth and the worth of his family, and realizes he made a mistake with Scarlett. He goes to the front desk of the building Scarlett lives in, and Raul (another doorman, played by Snoop Dogg) tells him Scarlett went to a club in the city with her family.

After being denied entry by the doorman, he sneaks into the club and dresses up as a chef to get some face time with Scarlett. After causing a scene, he gives a rousing, 'we belong together,' speech and Scarlett leaves with him.

== Cast ==
- Joseph Cross as Henry O'Shea
- Sarah Roemer as Scarlett Dowling
- Snoop Dogg as Raul
- Rachael Leigh Cook as Caitlin O'Shea
- Claudette Lali as Mercedes
- Joe Pantoliano as George
- Mimi Rogers as Meredith
- Annette O'Toole as Grace O'Shea
- Daniel Newman as Jake Weaver
- Samuel Page as Buck
- Frankie Shaw as Gretchen
- Gordon Clapp as Colin O'Shea
- Jim Piddock as Phillip Dowling
- Peter Jason as John O'Shea
- Ajay Naidu as Paco
- Sam Pancake as Ray
- Maria Cina as Mrs. Silverman

== Home media ==
First shown on the Showtime network, the film has a TV-14 rating for American television.

The film was released on Region 4 DVD in September 2009 under the alternate title The Golden Door, with an M advisory.

Falling Up was released on Region 1 DVD in January 2010 without an MPAA rating. The Region 2 DVD was released in March 2010 with a 12 certificate.

Reviewer Amy Longsdorf wrote that although the film is predictable, "this modest charmer has a surprising delicacy and old-fashioned humanity" and is worth watching at home.

== Locations ==
The exterior of the apartment building used in the movie is at 1215 5th Avenue, between 101st and 102nd Streets, just above Mt. Sinai Hospital. The Maine Monument at the entrance to Central Park at Merchants' Gate is also featured in one dog walking scene in the movie.
