= Travis Van Winkle =

American actor (born 1982)

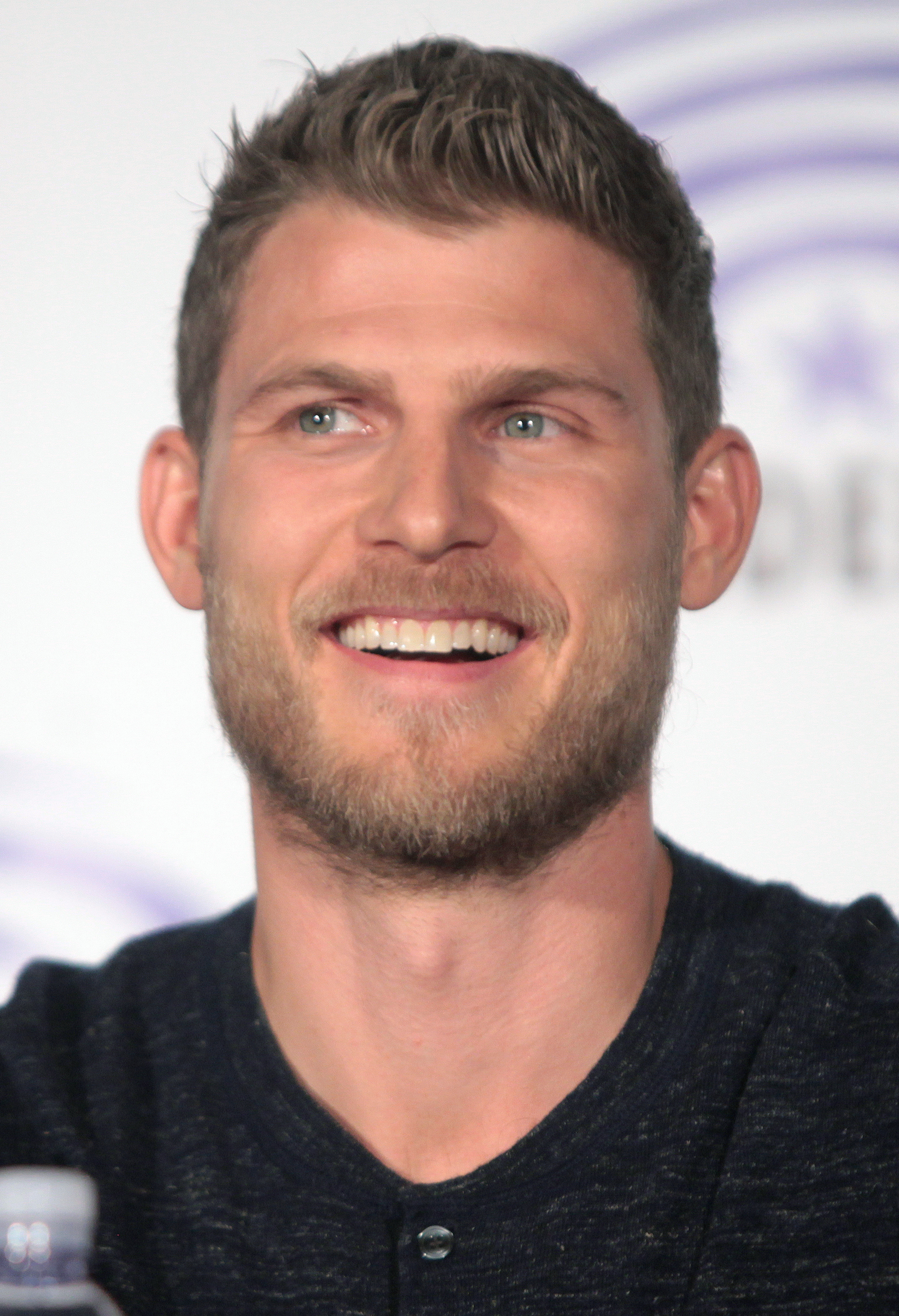
- Van Winkle at the 2016 WonderCon
- Born: Travis Scott Van Winkle; November 4, 1982 (age 43); Victorville, California, U.S.
- Occupation: Actor
- Years active: 2004–present

Travis Scott Van Winkle (born November 4, 1982) is an American actor, best known for starring in the feature film Accepted (2006), the 2021 third season of the Netflix streaming television series You, portraying Trent DeMarco in Transformers (2007), and Friday the 13th (2009), Lieutenant Danny Green in The Last Ship (2014–2018), and CIA operative Aldon Reese in the Netflix action comedy series FUBAR (2023–2025).

== Early life ==
Van Winkle was born in Victorville, California, the middle of three children of Sally (née Fitzgerald) and Charles Van Winkle. When he was two years old, his family moved to Oscoda, Michigan. When he was eight, his family moved again to Peachtree City, Georgia, where he graduated from McIntosh High School and attended the University of West Georgia but did not graduate, leaving at age 20 to pursue his acting endeavors in Hollywood. He is a member of the Baháʼí Faith.

== Career ==
Van Winkle made his television debut in a December 2004 episode of the Fox sitcom Quintuplets, and has since appeared in shows such as That's So Raven, Malcolm in the Middle, The O.C., and 7th Heaven. His film credits include one of the leads in Fox's Meet the Spartans, David R. Ellis's film Asylum, Universal's Accepted and Michael Bay's Transformers. While he has modeled for Abercrombie & Fitch shot by Bruce Weber, Van Winkle reprised the role of Trent DeMarco from Transformers in New Line/Paramount's 2009 reboot of Friday the 13th (another Bay production). He also appeared in Julianne Hough's 2008 music video for "That Song in My Head".

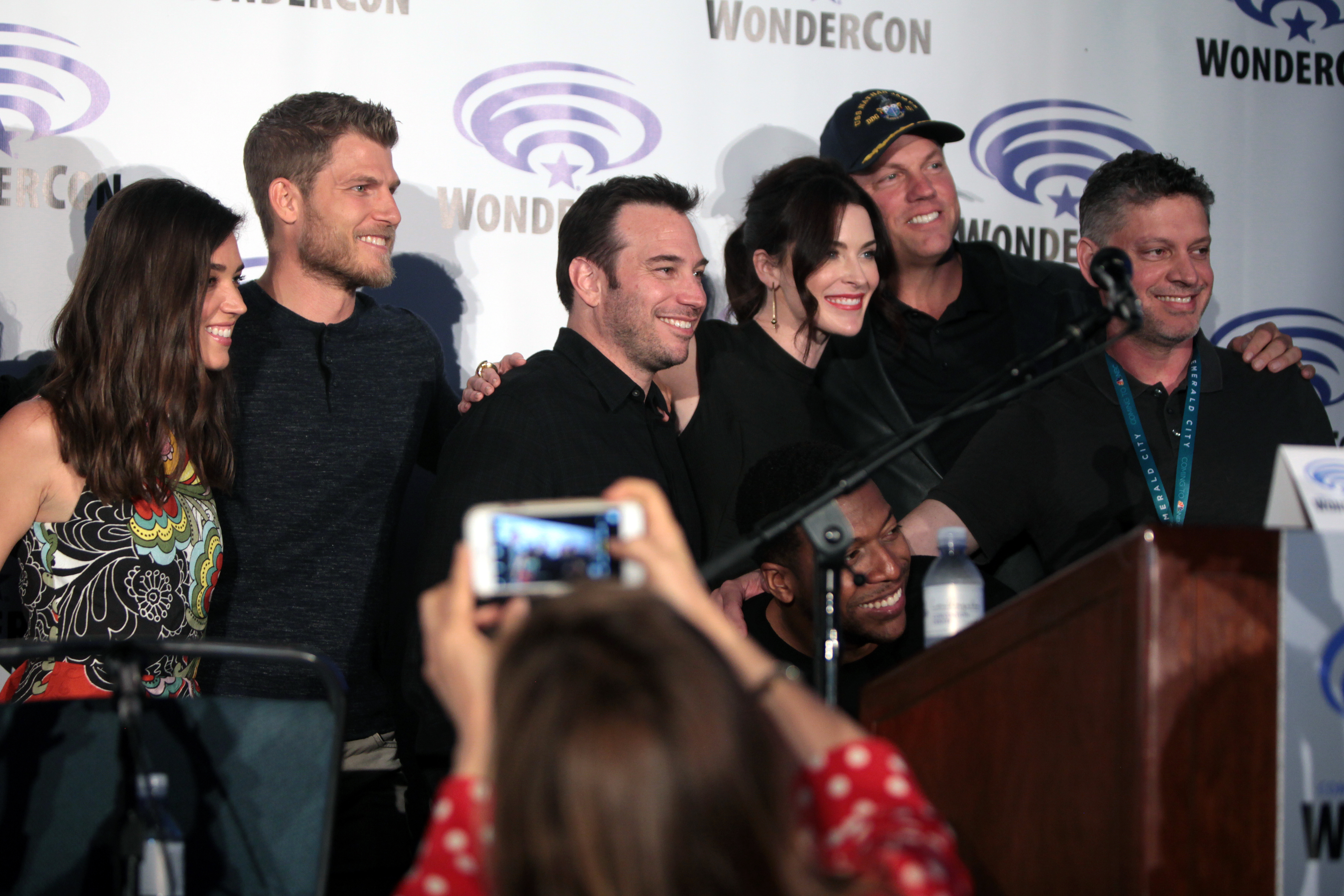
Travis Van Winkle and The Last Ship cast

In 2011, Van Winkle starred in the suspense thriller film 247°F co-starring Scout Taylor-Compton. In 2012, he starred in the independent comedy Last Call. He also appeared in the thriller Bloodwork, co-starring Tricia Helfer.

In 2011 and 2012, Van Winkle made guest appearances in television series such as Happy Endings, 2 Broke Girls, and Two and a Half Men. In October 2012, he was cast as Lieutenant Daniel Joshua "Danny" Green, leader of the Naval Mountain Warfare Special Forces Unit aboard the Nathan James, in the TNT action drama pilot The Last Ship, also executively produced by Bay. The series premiered on TNT on June 22, 2014. In December 2012, he was cast in a recurring role as Jonah on the second season of The CW's series Hart of Dixie.

In 2014, Van Winkle starred in the comedy film Mantervention. He also guest starred in an episode of Scorpion. In 2015, he starred in the PixL original movie Bound & Babysitting alongside Tammin Sursok.

In 2017, Van Winkle starred as Scott Hays in Hallmark channel original movie Christmas Getaway alongside Bridget Regan.

In 2019, Van Winkle appeared in the film Senior Love Triangle as the character Spencer.

In October 2020, Van Winkle was cast in the main role of Cary Conrad on the third season of the Netflix thriller series You.

In 2022, it was announced that he will be appearing in the upcoming Amazon Prime Video remake of the 1989 film Road House.

In 2026, Van Winkle will star in the Hallmark Channel/Disney television film Holiday Ever After: A Disney World Wish Come True.

== Filmography ==
=== Film ===
Year	Title	Role	Notes
2004	Instinct vs. Reason	Frat boy	Short film
2004	Billy's Dad Is a Fudge-Packer!	Billy's sister's boyfriend	Short film
2005	Confession	Scott	
2006	Accepted	Hoyt Ambrose	
2006	National Lampoon's Dorm Daze 2: College @ Sea	Frat guy	Direct-to-video
2006	Left in Darkness	Corby	Direct-to-video
2007	Transformers	Trent DeMarco	
2008	Meet the Spartans	Sonio	
2008	Asylum	Tommy	Direct-to-video
2009	Friday the 13th	Trent DeMarco	
2011	247°F	Ian	
2011	Intervention: Cinderella	Prince Charming	Short film
2012	Children of the Air	Trey Thomas	Short film
2012	Rites of Passage	Hart	
2012	Last Call	Danny	
2012	Bloodwork	Greg	
2013	Pulling the Goalie	Chip	Short film
2013	Crystal Lake Memories: The Complete History of Friday the 13th	Himself	Documentary film
2014	Mantervention	Coke	
2019	Senior Love Triangle	Spencer	
2024	Road House	Dex	

=== Television ===
Year	Title	Role	Notes
2004	Quintuplets	Great-looking Hugo	Episode: "Date Night"
2004	That's So Raven	Ben	Episode: "Double Vision"
2005	Malcolm in the Middle	Phillip	Episode: "Tiki Lounge"
2005	The O.C.	Kyle Thompson	Episode: "The O.C. Confidential"
2005	7th Heaven	Brian	Episode: "Helpful"
2007	Veronica Mars	Patrick Nickerson	Episode: "Weevils Wobble But They Don't Go Down"
2007	Greek	Travis	Episode: "Multiple Choice"
2009	90210	Jamie	4 episodes
2009	His Name Was Jason: 30 Years of Friday the 13th	Himself	Documentary film
2010	Law & Order: LA	Colin Blakely	Episode: "Hollywood"
2011	Happy Endings	Bo Bazinski	2 episodes
2011	2 Broke Girls	William	Episode: "And the '90s Horse Party"
2012	Two and a Half Men	Dylan	Episode: "A Possum on Chemo"
2012	CSI: Miami	Mickey	Episode: "Last Straw"
2012	Raising Hope	Philip	Episode: "Sabrina's New Jimmy"
2012	Squad 85	Rusty	6 episodes
2012	A Star for Christmas	Jared	Television film (ION)
2013	Hart of Dixie	Jonah Breeland	5 episodes
2014–2018	The Last Ship	Danny Green	Main role
2015	Adventures in Love & Babysitting	Alex	Television film (PixL)
2015	Scorpion	Ensign Nathan Hall	Episode: "Robots"
2017	Christmas Getaway	Scott Hayes	Television film (Hallmark)
2019	Instinct	Ryan Stock	11 episodes
2020	Project Christmas Wish	Lucas	Television film (Hallmark)
2021-2025	You	Cary Conrad	Main role (season 3)
2021-2025	You	Cary Conrad	Cameo (Season 5)
2021	'Tis the Season to be Merry	Adam Walters	Hallmark movie
2022	Good Sam	Dr. Eric Kace	4 episodes
2022	Made for Love	Aaron Benson	Episode: "You're Not the First"
2023–2025	FUBAR	Aldon	Main role; 16 episodes
2026	The Pitt	Curtis Larson	Episodes: "5:00 P.M. & "6:00 P.M.
2026	Holiday Ever After: A Disney World Wish Come True	Philip	Upcoming television film (Hallmark)

=== Web ===
Year	Title	Role	Notes
2012	Dating Rules from My Future Self	Marc	2 episodes
2013	The Life Genie	The Man	Episode: "The Man"

=== Music videos ===
Year	Title	Artist
2008	"That Song in My Head"	Julianne Hough
