= Locked In (2010 film) =

- DVD cover
- Directed by: Suri Krishnamma
- Written by: Ronnie Christensen; Suri Krishnamma
- Produced by: Michael Bassick; Susie Brooks-Smith; Harry Jason Lowell; Pippa Mitchell; Frida Torresblanco
- Starring: Ben Barnes; Sarah Roemer; Eliza Dushku; Brenda Fricker; Johnny Whitworth
- Cinematography: Bobby Bukowski
- Edited by: Chris Gill; Tracy Granger; Saska Simpson
- Music by: Haim Frank Ilfman
- Production companies: Stealth Media Group; Molinare; Palm Beach Entertainment
- Distributed by: Wrekin Hill Entertainment
- Release dates: September 17, 2010 (Boston); October 14, 2014 (DVD)
- Running time: 85 minutes
- Country: United States
- Language: English

Locked In is a 2010 independent thriller drama film directed by Suri Krishnamma and written by Ronnie Christensen, starring Ben Barnes, Sarah Roemer and Eliza Dushku. It was shot in the United States under the working title of Valediction.

== Plot ==
The story moves through the lives of two fragile yet determined people and maps a private geography of love, loss and ultimate redemption. Josh leaves his advertising career at its peak, when everyone wants either to be him or to have him. Then he walks away from it all: the money, recognition and the life. A car accident leaves his daughter suffering from "locked-in" syndrome. When everyone has given up, she starts communicating with him - or is he going mad?

== Cast ==
- Ben Barnes as Josh Sawyer
- Sarah Roemer as Emma Sawyer
- Eliza Dushku as Renee
- Brenda Fricker as Joan

== Release ==
The film premiered in the United States on September 17, 2010, at the 2010 Boston Film Festival. Lionsgate released the film on DVD on October 14, 2014.

== Reception ==
At its premiere at BFF, David Chen of /Film gave the film a harshly negative review after walking out thirty minutes in.
