= Nick Wauters =

Belgian television writer and editor

Nick Wauters (Dutch pronunciation: [nɪk ˈʋʌutərs]) is a Belgian-born American television writer and editor, best known as the creator and co-executive producer of the NBC television series, The Event.

He graduated from Oberlin College, where he produced and directed the feature-length film, The People We Used to Be. He has written for the television series Medium, The 4400, and Eureka. He has also written, directed, and produced several short films such as Rainy Season, based on the Stephen King short story.
