= Megan Ellison =

American film producer from California

- Born: Margaret Elizabeth Ellison; January 31, 1986 (age 40); Santa Clara County, California, U.S.
- Education: University of Southern California
- Occupation: Film producer
- Years active: 2004–present
- Known for: Founder and CEO of Annapurna Pictures
- Parents: Larry Ellison (father); Barbara Boothe (mother)
- Relatives: David Ellison (brother)

Margaret "Megan" Elizabeth Ellison (born January 31, 1986) is an American film producer. She founded Annapurna Pictures in 2011. Her production work includes the films Zero Dark Thirty (2012), American Hustle (2013), Her (2013), and Phantom Thread (2017), all of which earned her nominations for the Academy Award for Best Picture. She is also credited as an executive producer on Nimona (2023), which was nominated for Best Animated Feature.

In 2014, Ellison was included in the annual Time 100 list of the most influential people in the world. She also received a Tony Award for Best Musical as a producer for the musical A Strange Loop. She is the daughter of centibillionaire Larry Ellison.

== Early life and education ==
Ellison was born in Santa Clara County, California, the daughter of Oracle Corporation co-founder and chairman, multibillionaire Larry Ellison, and his ex-wife, Barbara Boothe Ellison. She has a brother, film producer David Ellison, who founded Skydance Media. Ellison graduated from Sacred Heart Preparatory in 2004 and attended film school at the University of Southern California for one year.

== Career ==
=== Initial film work ===
Her first film credit was as a boom operator for the short film When All Else Fails, a thriller written and directed by her brother David Ellison. Ellison then began to finance low-budget movies such as Waking Madison and Passion Play.

=== Transition to production ===
Ellison started out in the film business in 2006 when she contacted Katherine Brooks, the writer and director of Loving Annabelle, about investing in the filmmaker's next movie. The duo made plans for Waking Madison, starring Elisabeth Shue, which told the story of a woman who tries to cure her multiple personality disorder by locking herself in a room without food for 30 days. Ellison financed the film that was reported to have a budget of $2 million. Principal photography took place in 2007. It screened at the Newport Beach Film Festival in 2011 and went straight to DVD in July of that year.

Ellison provided some financing for more movies in 2008 and 2009. The first was Main Street starring Colin Firth. It received little attention at film festivals and failed to gain general release. Passion Play, also made in 2009, got a release but fared poorly at the box office despite a well-known cast of popular actors. However, her investment in the Coen brothers western remake True Grit paid off as that movie found major commercial and critical success when released at the end of 2010.

After that, Ellison received access to much larger sums of money from her father for the production of more movies and partnered with Michael Benaroya to produce and cofinance the thriller Catch .44 starring Bruce Willis and Forest Whitaker.

=== Founding and expansion of Annapurna ===
In 2011, she founded Annapurna Pictures to invest in original, daring movies made by visionary directors and screenwriters. Believing that risk-averse Hollywood studios had largely abandoned sophisticated dramas, period pieces, and auteur cinema, Annapurna Productions has released Paul Thomas Anderson's The Master, a period drama about a cult that resembles Scientology, Zero Dark Thirty, an action-thriller about the killing of Osama bin Laden from writer Mark Boal and director Kathryn Bigelow, Spike Jonze's Her, and David O. Russell's American Hustle. It was named for the Annapurna Circuit she hiked in Nepal in 2006. Annapurna is backed by Ellison's billionaire father.

In 2011, Ellison outbid Lionsgate for the rights to the Terminator franchise. Ellison would then make a deal with her brother David Ellison so his Skydance Productions produced Terminator Genisys, where Megan only had an executive producer credit.

In 2014, Ellison became the first woman and the fourth person to receive two Academy Award nominations for Best Picture in the same year, which she received for her work on Her and American Hustle.

In December 2016 Annapurna Pictures launched its video game division Annapurna Interactive which became well known for its publishing of critically acclaimed indie games in the late 2010s and early 2020s including What Remains of Edith Finch, Outer Wilds, and Neon White.

In 2019, Ellison lived in Lanai and remained there during the COVID-19 pandemic. In early 2021, her former chief of distribution Erik Lomis approached Ellison regarding purchasing Nimona, a project about to be cancelled with the closure of its production company Blue Sky Studios. She liked the footage and the film's LGBT elements, and agreed to acquire the project, establishing an Annapurna Animation division and hiring studio DNEG Animation to complete Nimona, eventually released by Netflix in 2023.

In September 2024 one month after announcing a partnership with Remedy Entertainment, Annapurna Interactive's then workforce of 25 people resigned following a dispute surrounding negotiations to spin off the company from Annapurna Pictures. Ellison ultimately pulled out during negotiations after the two sides failed to reach an agreement, leading to the resignations. Further attempts to reengage Ellison on the spin-off did not receive interest.

In October 2024, Ellison was announced as an executive producer on the film I Love Boosters and the television series Who Is Maud Dixon?.

== Personal life ==
Ellison is the daughter of Larry Ellison, founder of Oracle Corporation and controlling stakeholder of Paramount Skydance. The chairman and co-CEO of Skydance Corporation is her older brother David Ellison. Ellison is openly lesbian. She owns a number of motorcycles. Additionally, she is a competitive equestrian, having trained at the Wild Turkey Farm in Woodside, California, and riding in the North American Young Rider Championships in 2004.

== Filmography ==
Executive producer

- Passion Play (2010)
- True Grit (2010)
- Killing Them Softly (2012)
- Spring Breakers (2012)
- The Grandmaster (2013)
- Terminator Genisys (2015)
- Downsizing (2017)
- The Sisters Brothers (2018)
- If Beale Street Could Talk (2018)
- Wounds (2019)
- Where'd You Go, Bernadette (2019)
- Hustlers (2019)
- Bombshell (2019)
- Kajillionaire (2020)
- House of Gucci (2021)
- She Said (2022)
- Landscape with Invisible Hand (2023)
- Nimona (2023)
- Nightbitch (2024)
- The Testament of Ann Lee (2025)
- I Love Boosters (2026)

Producer

- Waking Madison (2010)
- Main Street (2010)
- Catch .44 (2011)
- Lawless (2012)
- The Master (2012)
- Zero Dark Thirty (2012)
- Her (2013)
- American Hustle (2013)
- Foxcatcher (2014)
- Joy (2015)
- Wiener-Dog (2016)
- Everybody Wants Some!! (2016)
- Sausage Party (2016)
- The Bad Batch (2016)
- 20th Century Women (2016)
- Detroit (2017)
- Phantom Thread (2017)
- The Ballad of Buster Scruggs (2018)
- Vice (2018)
- Booksmart (2019)
- The Invite (2026)

== Accolades ==
She has received four nominations for the Academy Award for Best Picture as a producer for the films American Hustle, Her, Phantom Thread and Zero Dark Thirty. As a producer of American Hustle, Ellison won the Golden Globe Award for Best Motion Picture – Musical or Comedy. She also has five Golden Globe nominations for the films Foxcatcher, Her, Joy, Zero Dark Thirty and 20th Century Women. The Producers Guild of America nominated American Hustle, Foxcatcher, Her and Zero Dark Thirty for Best Theatrical Motion Picture.

In 2012 and 2013, Ellison was nominated for subsequent BAFTA Award for Best Film and AACTA Award for Best Film recognizing Zero Dark Thirty and American Hustle respectively. She received a Gotham Award for Best Feature nomination for The Master.

In 2014, Ellison was included in the annual Time 100 list and part of The Advocate's annual "40 Under 40" list. In 2018, Ellison won the Woman in Motion Award at Cannes Music Festival.
