= Asylum (2008 film) =

- Theatrical poster
- Directed by: David R. Ellis
- Written by: Ethan Lawrence
- Produced by: Ashok Amritraj
- Starring: Sarah Roemer; Jake Muxworthy; Mark Rolston
- Cinematography: Gary Capo
- Edited by: Howard E. Smith
- Music by: David Hamilton
- Production companies: Hyde Park Films; Mad Scientist Productions
- Distributed by: MGM Home Entertainment
- Release date: July 15, 2008
- Running time: 93 minutes
- Country: United States
- Language: English
- Budget: $10 million

Asylum is a 2008 American horror film directed by David R. Ellis. The film was initially planned for a theatrical release but was instead released straight to DVD on July 15, 2008. Asylum stars Sarah Roemer as a young college student who must fight to survive the spirit of a mad doctor that is haunting her dorm.

== Plot ==
A college student discovers her dorm was once a notorious asylum. According to Winthrop's campus newspaper, The Johnsonian, a group of college freshmen with troubled pasts and nightmares are at Richard Miller University for orientation a couple of weeks prior to the beginning of classes. They stumble into an old restricted area and awaken the spirit of a mad doctor, who then proceeds to torture and torment the students in the same way he tortured the patients in 1939 at Burke Asylum. During the film, first String is killed, then Maya, followed by Tommy, school's caretaker Mackey, and Ivy. All are killed by the Doctor. In the end The Doctor chases Madison and Holt through a tunnel, an abandoned factory, and the woods until Madison kills him by stabbing him in the head, causing him to lose all his power and the souls that he has taken. The movie ends with Madison and Holt walking out of the forest finally being able to have closure with their pasts.

== Cast ==
- Sarah Roemer as Madison
- Carolina Garcia as Maya
- Ellen Hollman as Ivy
- Randall Sims as Rez
- Travis Van Winkle as Tommy
- Jake Muxworthy as Holt
- Cody Kasch as String
- Lin Shaye as String's Mother
- Mark Rolston as The Doctor
- Joe Inscoe as Mackey
- Ben Daniele as Brandon
- Caroline Kent as "young Madison"
- Brantley Pollock as "young Brandon"
- Ari Tinnen as Uli
- Crystal McLaurin-Coney as College Ambassador

== Production ==
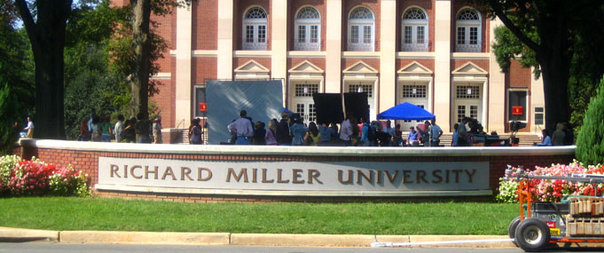
Entrance to Winthrop University as seen during filming

Filming for Asylum took place at Winthrop University in Rock Hill, South Carolina. Ellis chose the location due to the school fit the look that he wanted for the film and due to incentives that South Carolina was offering for film production The university's name was changed for the film, from Winthrop University to Richard Miller University, with various elements of the school changed to reflect the name of the fictional school. Filming took place over a five-and-a-half-week period and had a budget of $10 million.

Plans for a theatrical release for Asylum were dropped indefinitely by Hyde Park in favor of a straight to DVD release. Ellis later stated that the reason for this was that although foreign rights to Asylum were sold, box office reception for horror films were not performing up to the number that Hyde Park wanted for the movie and they canceled plans for its theatrical debut.

== Reception ==
Critical reception for Asylum has been predominantly negative. Shock Till You Drop heavily criticized the film, remarking that if you "combine the House on Haunted Hill remake and A Nightmare on Elm Street – minus all the good parts – and you will get Asylum." Dread Central also panned the film, noting that it "seems like it was aimed more toward the young adult demographic than the horror fan" and that anyone other than a "fourteen-year-old girl" would likely find it "horribly average".
