= David R. Ellis =

American film director (1952–2013)

- Born: David Richard Ellis; September 8, 1952; Santa Monica, California, U.S.
- Died: January 7, 2013 (aged 60); Johannesburg, South Africa
- Occupations: Film director; second unit director; stuntman
- Years active: 1975–2013

David Richard Ellis (September 8, 1952 – January 7, 2013) was an American film director and stunt performer born in Santa Monica, California, in 1952. His credits included dozens of films and television series including National Lampoon's Vacation, Baywatch, Lethal Weapon, and Patriot Games.

He also served as second unit director on blockbuster action films like Waterworld, Harry Potter and the Philosopher's Stone, The Matrix Reloaded, and Master and Commander: The Far Side of the World. His feature directorial credits included the action thriller Snakes on a Plane and two entries in the Final Destination film series.

On January 7, 2013, Ellis was found dead in his hotel room in Johannesburg, South Africa. The cause of his death remains unknown.

== Career ==
Following a successful career as a junior pro surfer, David Richard Ellis began his career in the film industry as a supporting actor in juvenile roles making his big screen debut in 1975 in the Kurt Russell film The Strongest Man in the World. In 1978, he received a promotion to stunt coordinator on The Invasion of the Body Snatchers. After several successful years in this position, he worked from 1986 onwards as a second unit director before making his debut as a director in the Disney live-action film Homeward Bound II: Lost in San Francisco. He served as the Co-Director in Final Destination (2000) and directed two best known Final Destination Films. In 2006 film Snakes on a Plane, which became an Internet phenomenon.

As a stunt man he was best known for his work in the movie Scarface. Other notable works as a stunt man include Fatal Attraction, Lethal Weapon, the television series Baywatch, and Patriot Games. As a second unit director he worked on a number of well-known movies that include Harry Potter and the Philosopher's Stone, The Matrix Reloaded, Master and Commander: The Far Side of the World, and Cop Out. At the time of his death, two works involving Ellis were still in post-production: 47 Ronin and R.I.P.D. while another, Winter's Tale, was still being filmed. R.I.P.D. was released in July 2013, 47 Ronin was released in December of that year, and Winter's Tale was released in February 2014.

He was perhaps best known as a director with seven titles under his belt. Homeward Bound II: Lost in San Francisco, Final Destination 2, Cellular, Snakes on a Plane, Asylum, The Final Destination, and Shark Night. At the time of his death, he was in pre-production for a live-action version of the violent anime Kite. Ralph Ziman became the film's director.

Ellis was nominated for the Taurus Award along with Glenn Boswell and R. A. Rondell in 2003 for his stunt coordination work on The Matrix Reloaded. Ellis was a member and served as vice president for an elite stunt performance organization known as Stunts Unlimited located in Sherman Oaks, California.

== Personal life ==
David R. Ellis was the father of producer Tawny, photographer Cheyenne Ellis, and UC Irvine English Instructor, Tagert Ellis. He was the son of Richard and Andrea Ellis, the grandfather to Kodiak and Ridge Ellis, as well as the brother of Annie, Lori, and Chenoa Ellis. He is survived by his widow Cindy.

When Ellis was once about to be carjacked, trapped between two other cars, he used his stunt-driving prowess to whip his car out of the tiny gap and face the carjackers, revving his engine, scaring them enough to get back into their cars and drive away.

== Death ==
On January 7, 2013, Ellis's body was found in the bathroom of his hotel room in Johannesburg, South Africa. He was preparing to direct Kite at the time. No cause of death has been released; police say no foul play was suspected.

== Filmography ==
=== Director ===
| Year | Film | Budget | Worldwide gross |
|---|---|---|---|
| 1996 | Homeward Bound II: Lost in San Francisco | | $32,772,492 (USA) |
| 2003 | Final Destination 2 | $26,000,000 | $90,941,129 |
| 2004 | Cellular | $25,000,000 | $57,678,321 |
| 2006 | Snakes on a Plane | $33,000,000 | $62,022,014 |
| 2008 | Asylum | $11,000,000 | Direct-to-video |
| 2009 | The Final Destination | $40,000,000 | $186,167,139 |
| 2011 | Shark Night | $28,000,000 | $41,363,927 |

=== Second unit director ===
==== Film ====
| Year | Project | Director | Notes |
|---|---|---|---|
| 1986 | Condor | Virgil W. Vogel | as David Ellis |
| 1987 | Fatal Attraction | Adrian Lyne | uncredited |
| 1989 | Warlock | Steve Miner | |
| 1990 | The Last of the Finest | John MacKenzie | |
| 1991 | Life Stinks | Mel Brooks | uncredited |
| 1992 | Kuffs | Bruce A. Evans | as David Ellis |
| 1992 | Thunderheart | Michael Apted | as David Richard Ellis |
| 1992 | Patriot Games | Philip Noyce | |
| 1992 | Whispers in the Dark | Christopher Crowe | |
| 1992 | Forever Young | Steve Miner | |
| 1993 | Body of Evidence | Uli Edel | |
| 1993 | Sliver | Philip Noyce | |
| 1993 | Made in America | Richard Benjamin | |
| 1993 | Beethoven's 2nd | Rod Daniels | |
| 1994 | Iron Will | Charles Haid | |
| 1994 | My Father the Hero | Steve Miner | as David Ellis |
| 1994 | Blank Check | Rupert Wainwright | |
| 1994 | Clear and Present Danger | Philip Noyce | |
| 1994 | The Jungle Book | Stephen Sommers | |
| 1995 | Waterworld | Kevin Reynolds | |
| 1997 | The Devil's Own | Alan J. Pakula | Dublin - as David Ellis |
| 1998 | Desperate Measures | Barbet Schroeder | |
| 1998 | Sphere | Barry Levinson | as David Ellis |
| 1998 | The Negotiator | F. Gary Gray | Los Angeles - as David Ellis |
| 1998 | Holy Man | Stephen Herek | |
| 1998 | Soldier | Paul W.S. Anderson | as David Ellis |
| 1999 | Deep Blue Sea | Renny Harlin | as David Ellis |
| 1999 | Ride with the Devil | Ang Lee | as David Ellis |
| 1999 | Blue Streak | Les Mayfield | |
| 2000 | The Kid | Jon Turteltaub | |
| 2000 | The Perfect Storm | Wolfgang Petersen | |
| 2001 | Exit Wounds | Andrzej Bartkowiak | as David Ellis |
| 2001 | Just Visiting | Jean-Marie Gaubert | as David Ellis |
| 2001 | Rock Star | Stephen Herek | as David Ellis |
| 2001 | Harry Potter and the Sorcerer's Stone | Chris Columbus | as David Ellis |
| 2003 | The Matrix Reloaded | The Wachowskis | USA - as David Ellis |
| 2003 | Master and Commander: The Far Side of the World | Peter Weir | |
| 2010 | Cop Out | Kevin Smith | |
| 2013 | R.I.P.D. | Robert Schwentke | Posthumous release |
| 2013 | 47 Ronin | Carl Erik Rinsch | Posthumous release |
| 2014 | Winter's Tale | Akiva Goldsman | as David Ellis; posthumous release; final film |

==== Television ====
| Year | Project | Episode | Notes |
|---|---|---|---|
| 1989 | Baywatch | "Rookie School"; "The Reunion" | as David Ellis |
| 1990 | Baywatch | "We Need a Vacation"; "Muddy Waters" | as David Ellis |

=== Actor ===
| Year | Film | Role | Notes |
|---|---|---|---|
| 1975 | The Strongest Man in the World | David (Student) | |
| 1977 | Heroes | Bar Patron #1 | |
| 1978 | Wonder Woman | Ludwig | TV Series |
| 1978 | Flying High | Quarterback | TV Series |
| 1979 | Boardwalk | Bath attendant | |
| 1982 | Rocky III | Opponent #7 | |
| 1987 | Anna | Daniel's Father | |
| 1988 | Guns of Paradise | Lester Bradley | TV Series |
| 1989 | The Mighty Quinn | Jersey | |
| 1989 | Blind Fury | Ski Lodge Killer #3 | |
| 1990 | The Bounty Hunter | Townsperson | (final film role) |

=== Stunts ===
==== Film ====
| Year | Film | Director | Role |
|---|---|---|---|
| 1976 | Baby Blue Marine | John D. Hancock | uncredited |
| 1976 | Bound for Glory | Hal Ashby | as David Ellis |
| 1977 | Smokey and the Bandit | Hal Needham | uncredited |
| 1978 | Game of Death | Bruce Lee | motorcycle stunts - as David Ellis |
| 1978 | Deathsport | Allan Arkush | motorcycle stunts - as David Ellis |
| 1978 | Hot Lead and Cold Feet | Robert Butler | as David Ellis |
| 1978 | Hopper | Hal Needham | |
| 1978 | Invasion of the Body Snatchers | Philip Kaufman | Stunt Coordinator - as David Ellis |
| 1979 | Fast Charlie... the Moonbeam Rider | Steve Carver | motorcycle stunts - as David Ellis |
| 1980 | Carny | Robert Kaylor | Stunt Coordinator - as David Ellis |
| 1980 | Smokey and the Bandit II | Hal Needham | as David Ellis |
| 1981 | Back Roads | Martin Ritt | Stunt Coordinator |
| 1981 | King of the Mountain | Noel Nosseck | Stunt Coordinator |
| 1981 | Take This Job and Shove It | Gus Trikonis | as David Ellis |
| 1981 | Nice Dreams | Tommy Chong | Stunt Double for Tommy Chong - as David Ellis |
| 1981 | S.O.B. | Blake Edwards | as David Ellis |
| 1981 | Return of the Rebels | Noel Nosseck | Stunt Coordinator - as David Ellis |
| 1981 | Taps | Harold Becker | as David Ellis |
| 1981 | Sharky's Machine | Burt Reynolds | as David Ellis |
| 1982 | Megaforce | Hal Needham | as David Ellis |
| 1982 | The Beastmaster | Don Coscarelli | as David Ellis |
| 1982 | Fast Times at Ridgemont High | Amy Heckerling | as David Ellis |
| 1982 | Lookin' to Get Out | Hal Ashby | as David Ellis |
| 1982 | Airplane II: The Sequel | Ken Finkleman | Stunt Coordinator |
| 1983 | Second Thoughts | Lawrence Turman | Stunt Coordinator - as David Ellis |
| 1983 | Private School | Noel Black | |
| 1983 | National Lampoon's Vacation | Harold Ramis | as David Ellis |
| 1983 | Scarface | Brian De Palma | as David Ellis |
| 1983 | Gorky Park | Michael Apted | Stunt Coordinator - as David Ellis |
| 1984 | Fooling Around | Richard T. Heffron | |
| 1985 | To Live and Die in L.A. | William Friedkin | |
| 1986 | Out of Bounds | Richard Tuggle | |
| 1986 | A Fine Mess | Blake Edwards | as David Ellis |
| 1986 | The Wraith | Mike Marvin | as David Ellis |
| 1987 | Critical Condition | Michael Apted | Stunt Coordinator - as David Ellis |
| 1987 | Lethal Weapon | Richard Donner | as David Ellis |
| 1987 | Burglar | Hugh Wilson | Stunt Coordinator - as David Ellis |
| 1987 | Fatal Attraction | Adrian Lyne | Stunt Coordinator - as David Ellis |
| 1987 | Real Men | Dennis Feldman | as David Ellis |
| 1988 | The Presidio | Peter Hyams | |
| 1989 | Gleaming the Cube | Graeme Clifford | as David Ellis |
| 1989 | Dead Bang | John Frankenheimer | as David Ellis |
| 1989 | She's Out of Control | Stan Dragoti | as David Ellis |
| 1989 | Warlock | Steve Miner | Stunt Coordinator |
| 1989 | Road House | Rowdy Herrington | as David Ellis |
| 1989 | Star Trek V: The Final Frontier | William Shatner | as David Richard Ellis |
| 1989 | Tennessee Waltz | Nicolas Gessner | Fight Coordinator - as David Richard Ellis |
| 1989 | Phantom of the Mall: Eric's Revenge | Richard Friedman | as David Ellis |
| 1990 | Everybody Wins | Karel Reisz | Stunt Coordinator - as David Ellis |
| 1990 | The Last of the Finest | John MacKanzie | Stunt Coordinator - as David Ellis |
| 1990 | Catchfire | Dennis Hopper | |
| 1990 | Impulse | Sondra Locke | Stunt Coordinator |
| 1990 | Days of Thunder | Tony Scott | as David Ellis |
| 1990 | Ghost Dad | Sidney Poitier | as David Ellis |
| 1990 | The Freshman | Andrew Bergman | Stunt Coordinator |
| 1990 | Misery | Rob Reiner | Stunt Coordinator - as David Ellis |
| 1991 | Life Stinks | Mel Brooks | Stunt Coordinator - as David Richard Ellis |
| 1991 | Wild Hearts Can't Be Broken | Steve Miner | Stunt Coordinator |
| 1991 | The Addams Family | Barry Sonnenfeld | Stunt Coordinator - as David Ellis |
| 1992 | Kuffs | Bruce A. Evans | Stunt Coordinator - as David Ellis |
| 1992 | Patriot Games | Philip Noyce | Stunt Coordinator |
| 1992 | Forever Young | Steve Miner | Stunt Coordinator - as David Ellis |
| 1993 | Body of Evidence | Uli Edel | Stunt Coordinator - as David Ellis |
| 1993 | Sliver | Philip Noyce | Stunt Coordinator - as David Ellis |
| 1993 | Made in America | Richard Benjamin | Stunt Coordinator |
| 1993 | The Man Without a Face | Mel Gibson | Stunt Coordinator - as David Ellis |
| 1993 | Warlock: The Armageddon | Anthony Hickox | as David Ellis |
| 1994 | The Jungle Book | Stephen Sommers | Stunt Coordinator: USA - as David Ellis |
| 1996 | Harriet the Spy | Bronwen Hughes | as Dave Ellis |
| 2009 | Hotel for Dogs | Thor Freudenthal | as David Richard Ellis |

==== Television ====
| Year | Film | Episode | Role |
|---|---|---|---|
| 1984 | V: The Final Battle | Part One; Part Two; Part Three | Stunt Coordinator - as David Ellis |
| 1984 | V | | Stunt Coordinator - as David Ellis |
| 1989 | Baywatch | In Deep; Heat Wave; Second Wave; Message in a Bottle; The Sky Is Falling; The Drowning Pool; Rookie School; Cruise Ship; The Cretin of the Shallows; Shelter Me; The Reunion | Stunt Coordinator - as David Ellis |
| 1990 | Baywatch | Armored Car; Home Cort; We Need a Vacation; Muddy Waters | Stunt Coordinator - as David Ellis |
