= List of Final Destination characters =

Characters in horror film series

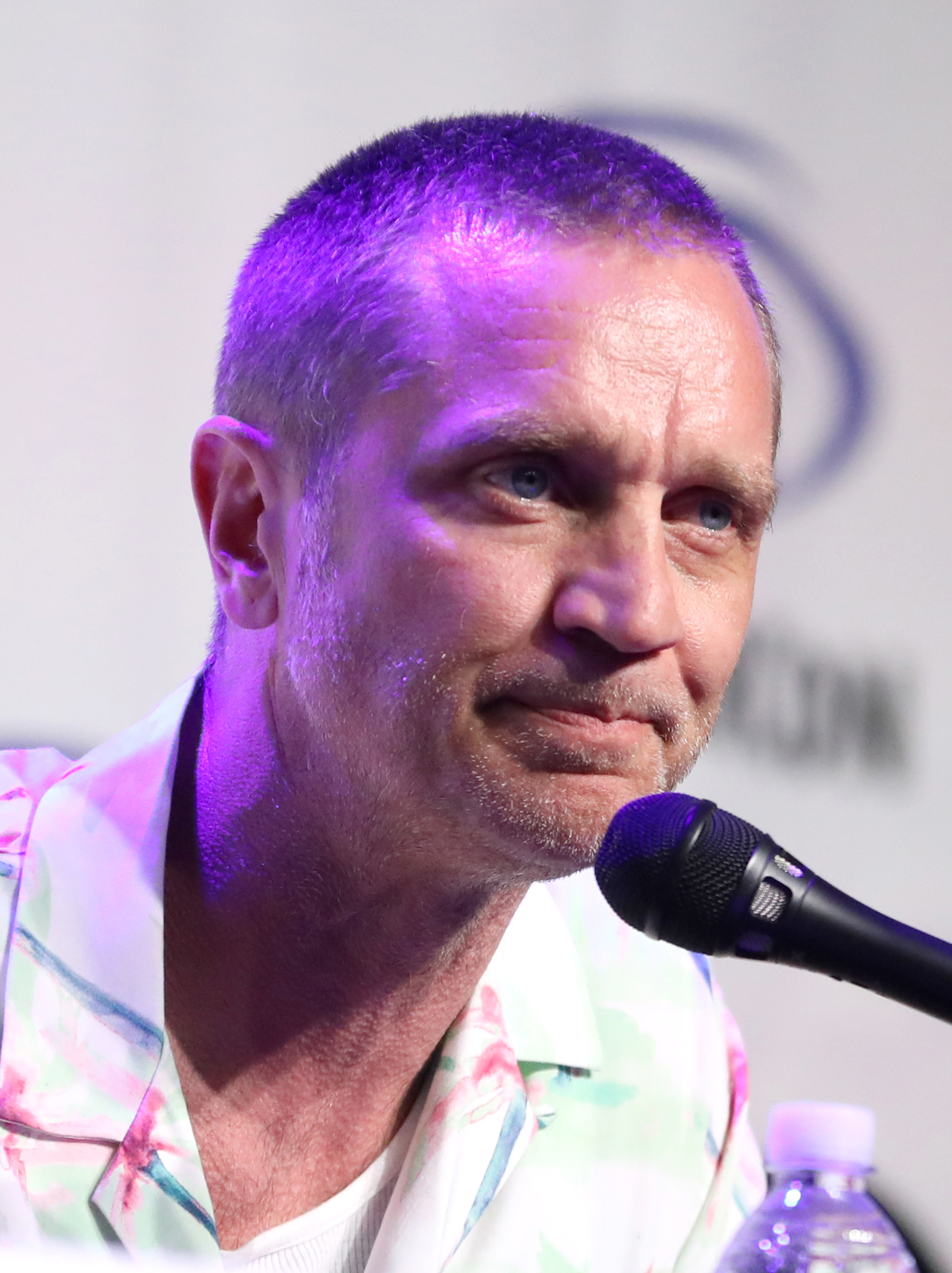
Devon Sawa

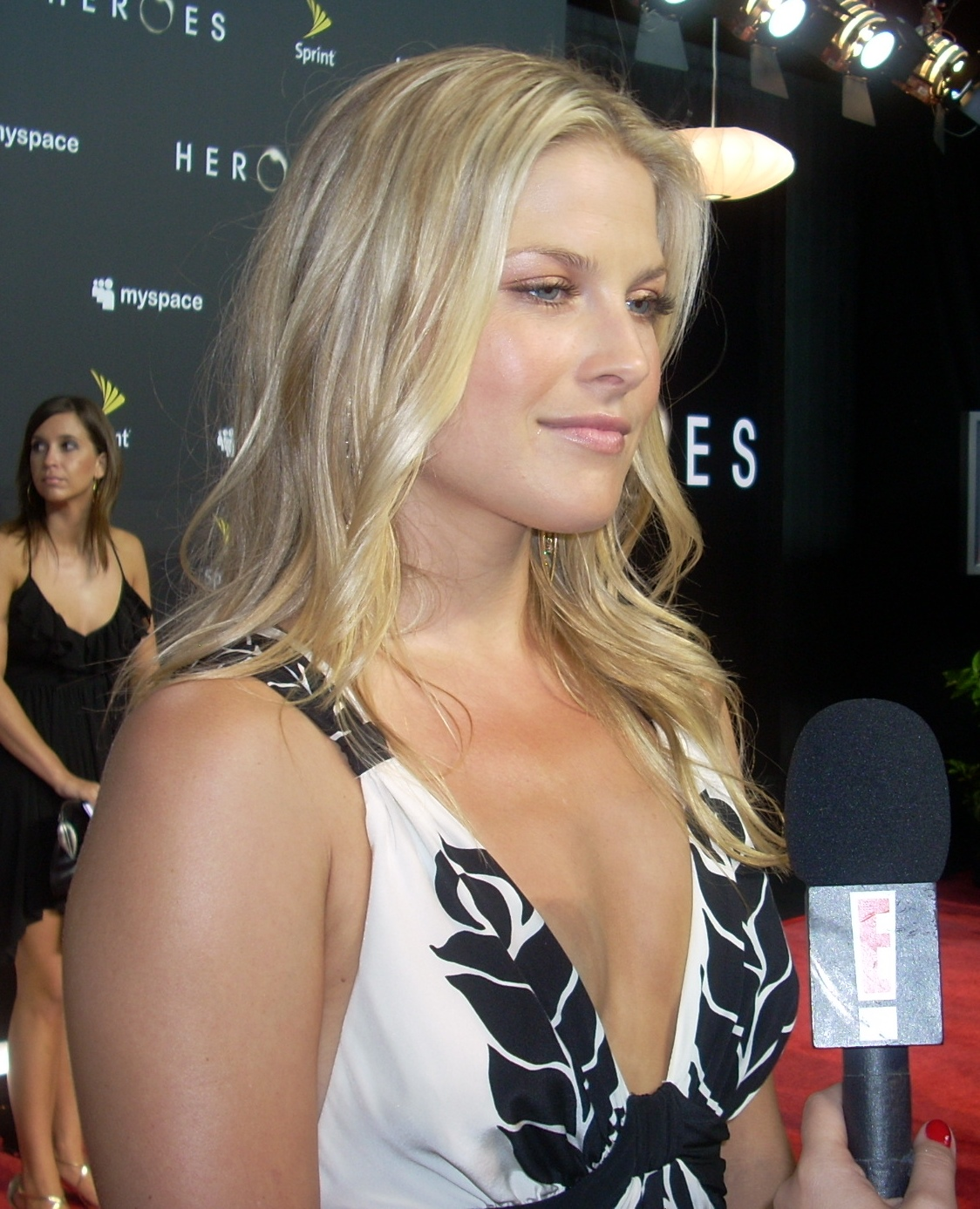
Ali Larter

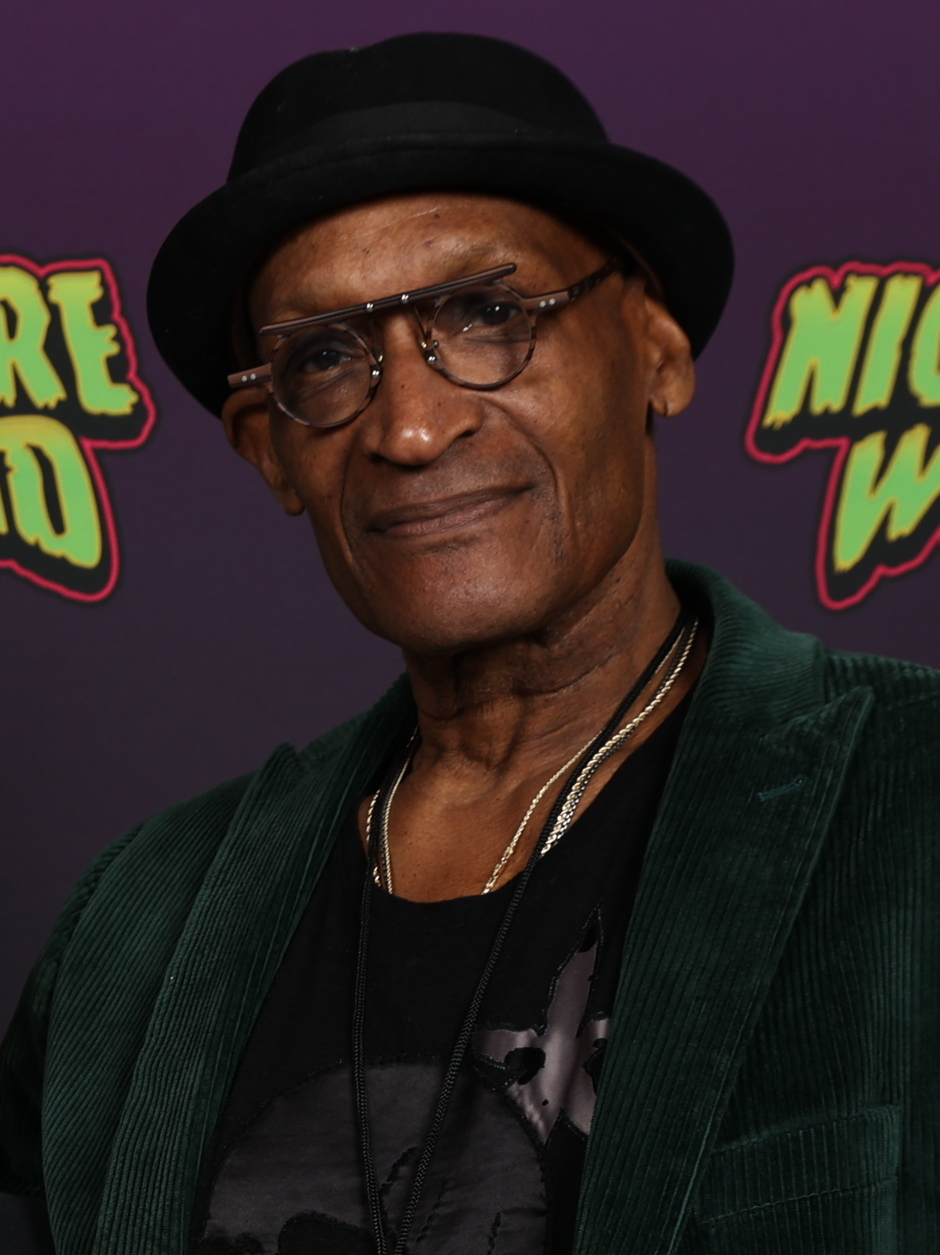
Tony Todd

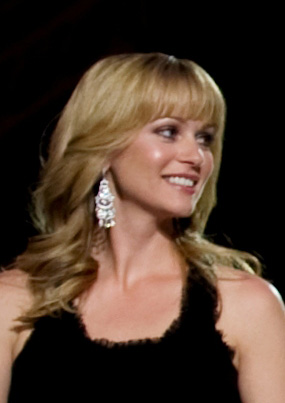
A. J. Cook

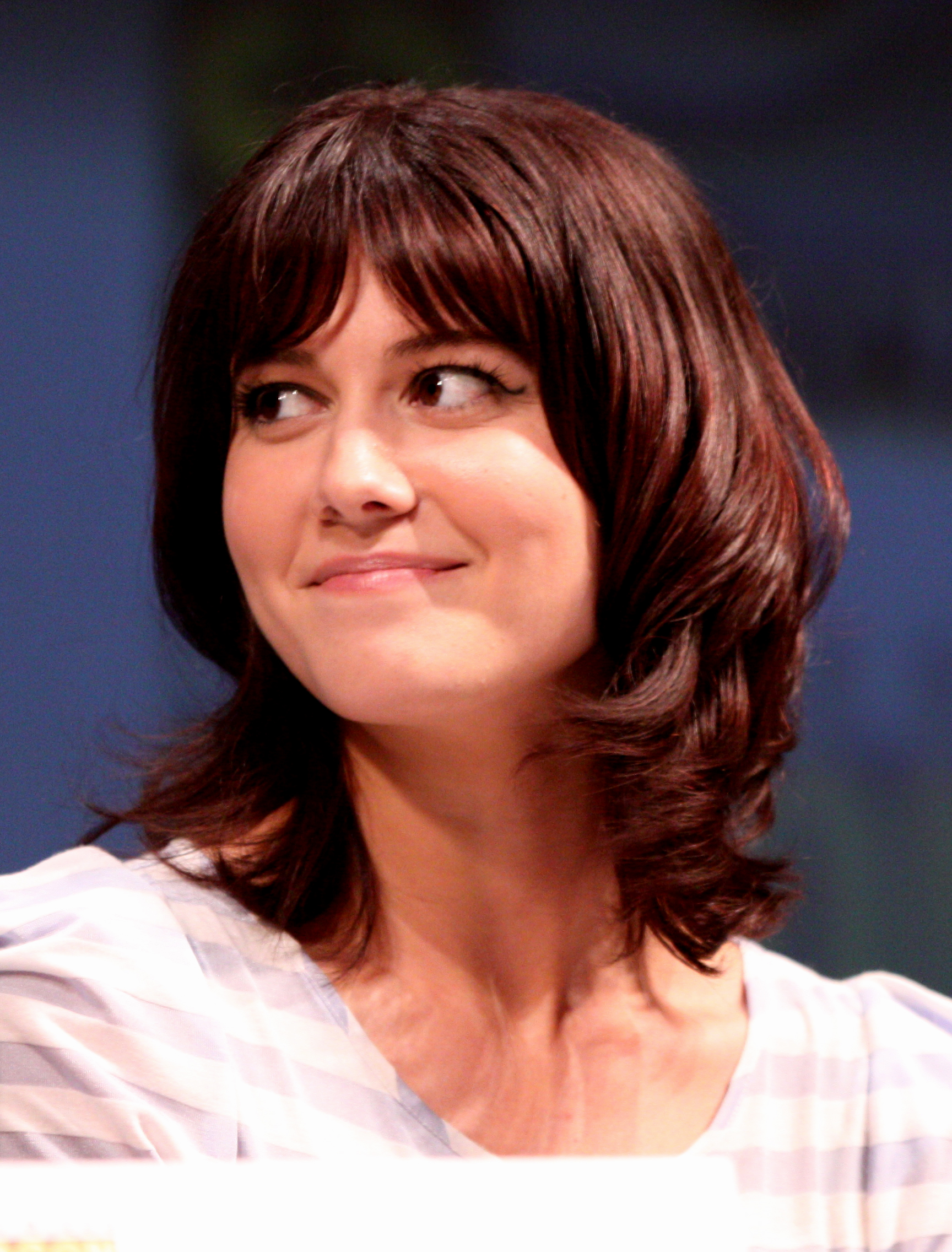
Mary Elizabeth Winstead

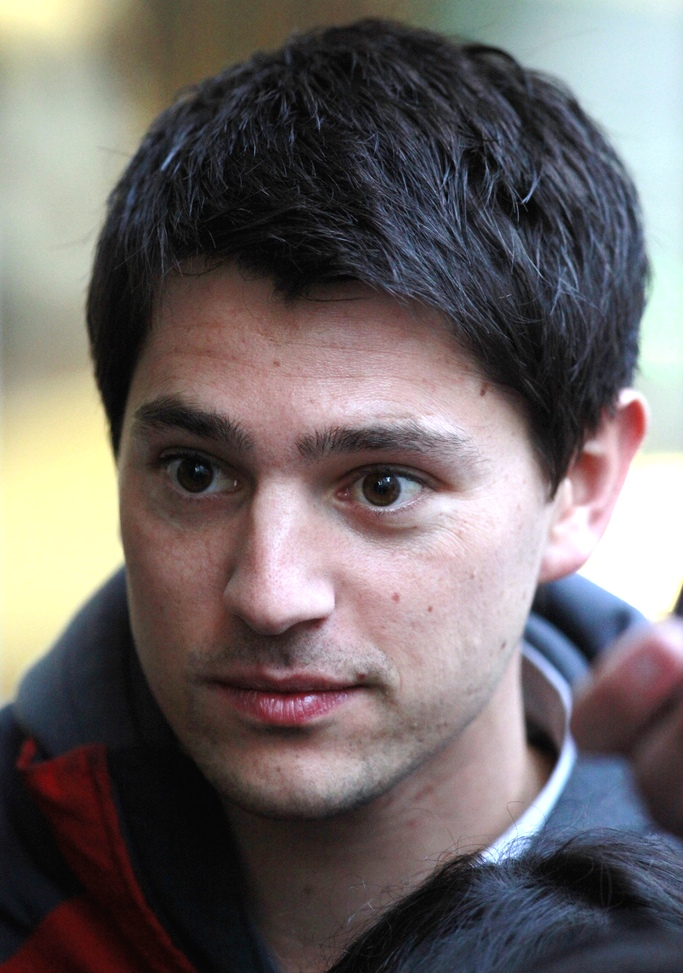
Nicholas D'Agosto

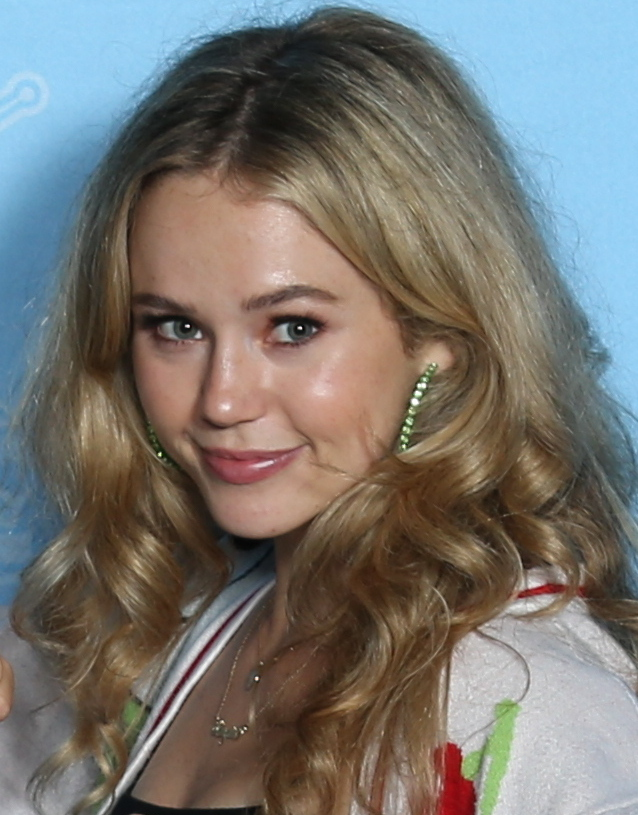
Brec Bassinger

Sawa and Larter have central roles in the first film, with Larter returning for the second. Todd has a supporting role in all films except the fourth, with a voice-only cameo in the third. Cook, Winstead, Campo and D'Agosto have central roles in the second, third, fourth and fifth installments, respectively. In the sixth film, Bassinger played the visionary of the opening sequence, while Santa Juana portrayed the lead.

The American supernatural horror film series Final Destination features a large cast of characters, many of whom were originally created by Glen Morgan and Jeffrey Reddick, with contributions from James Wong (who directed and wrote the first and third films), J. Mackye Gruber (who wrote the second), Eric Bress (who wrote the second and fourth), Eric Heisserer (who wrote the fifth), and Guy Busick and Lori Evans Taylor (who wrote the sixth). The series comprises six films: Final Destination (2000), Final Destination 2 (2003), Final Destination 3 (2006), The Final Destination (2009), Final Destination 5 (2011), and Final Destination Bloodlines (2025).

The Final Destination films focuses on characters who experience a sudden premonition of themselves and several other people dying in a catastrophic accident, only to escape the event moments before it turns into a reality. The survivors are later killed one by one through bizarre accidents caused by an unseen force that creates complicated chains of cause and effect frequently resembling Rube Goldberg machines in their complexity. The series is noteworthy amongst others in the horror genre because the "villain" is not the stereotypical slasher or monster, but Death itself—occasionally seen as a shadow or a wind gust—which manipulates the environment in deadly ways to reclaim the lives of the survivors.

The list of characters includes those who died in the initial premonitions and those who died among the survivors. Characters are listed in alphabetical order, and are arranged by chronological appearance. Unnecessary characters are excluded, for example, those who do not affect the story heavily. The characters' status indicates whether they are alive, deceased, or if it is unknown.

== Introduced in Final Destination ==
The Flight 180 survivors (from left to right): Valerie Lewton (Kristen Cloke), Billy Hitchcock (Seann William Scott), Carter Horton (Kerr Smith), Terry Chaney (Amanda Detmer), Clear Rivers (Ali Larter), Alex Browning (Devon Sawa), and Tod Waggner (Chad Donella).

Final Destination is the first film in the Final Destination series. It focuses on high school student Alex Browning, who has a premonition about a catastrophic plane explosion that will kill everybody on board. He leaves the plane along with six other people—his best friend Tod Waggner, his arch-rival Carter Horton, Carter's girlfriend Terry Chaney, classmates Clear Rivers and Billy Hitchcock, and their teacher Valerie Lewton—just before the explosion occurs, but Death begins to claim the lives of the survivors in the same order they should have died on the explosion.

=== Alex Browning ===
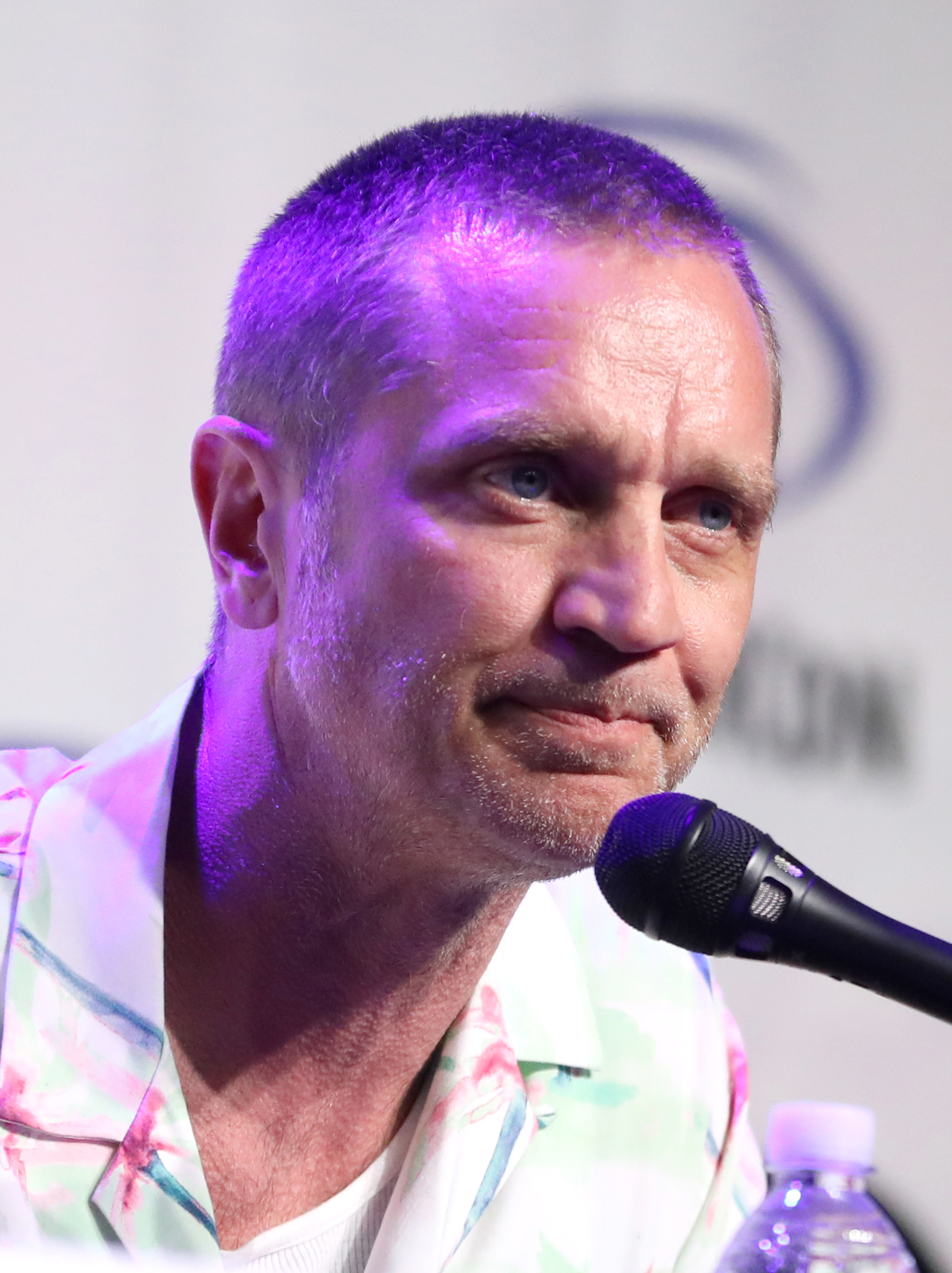
Devon Sawa portrays Alex Browning in Final Destination.

- Portrayed by Devon Sawa
- Appeared in: Final Destination, Final Destination 2 (photo only), and Final Destination 5 (archive footage)
- Status: Deceased

Alex Theodore Browning is the protagonist and visionary of Final Destination. He is one of the survivors of the Flight 180 explosion, and the sixth survivor to die.

Alex is a student at Mt. Abraham High School who boards Volée Airlines Flight 180 with his classmates for their senior trip to Paris, France. Before take-off, Alex has a premonition about a mechanical failure that will cause a mid-air explosion, killing everyone on board. When the events from his vision begin to occur in reality, he panics and is thrown off the plane along with five classmates and their teacher, all of whom witness the plane explode moments later.

One month later, Alex learns that Death is still after the survivors when they begin to die one by one in a series of bizarre accidents, and attempts to figure out Death's plan to save them. He manages to save Carter Horton and Clear Rivers, causing Death to skip them and leading the trio to believe they have cheated Death. Six months later, Alex, Clear, and Carter travel to Paris to celebrate their survival. However, Alex realizes that Death still has not skipped him and is nearly killed by a falling sign. Carter saves Alex, and Death skips him. When Carter asks who is the next to die, the sign swings back down and kills him.

In Final Destination 2, it is revealed that after the events of the original film, Alex and Clear cheated Death dozens of times before he was finally killed by a dislodged brick from a nearby building. In Final Destination 3, Alex is briefly mentioned by Kevin Fischer while he explains to Wendy Christensen about the Flight 180 explosion and the sudden deaths of the survivors. In Final Destination 5, Alex appears through archive footage as he is removed from Flight 180 while warning the other passengers that the plane will explode.

=== Barbara and Ken Browning ===
- Portrayed by Barbara Tyson and Robert Wisden
- Appeared in: Final Destination
- Status: Both alive

Barbara Browning and Ken Browning are the mother and father of Alex Browning. Barbara and Ken are first seen helping Alex pack his bags before his flight to Paris, and are later seen comforting him after the plane explodes. Ken expresses his concern for Alex when he refuses to speak to both him and Barbara about what happened.

=== Billy Hitchcock ===
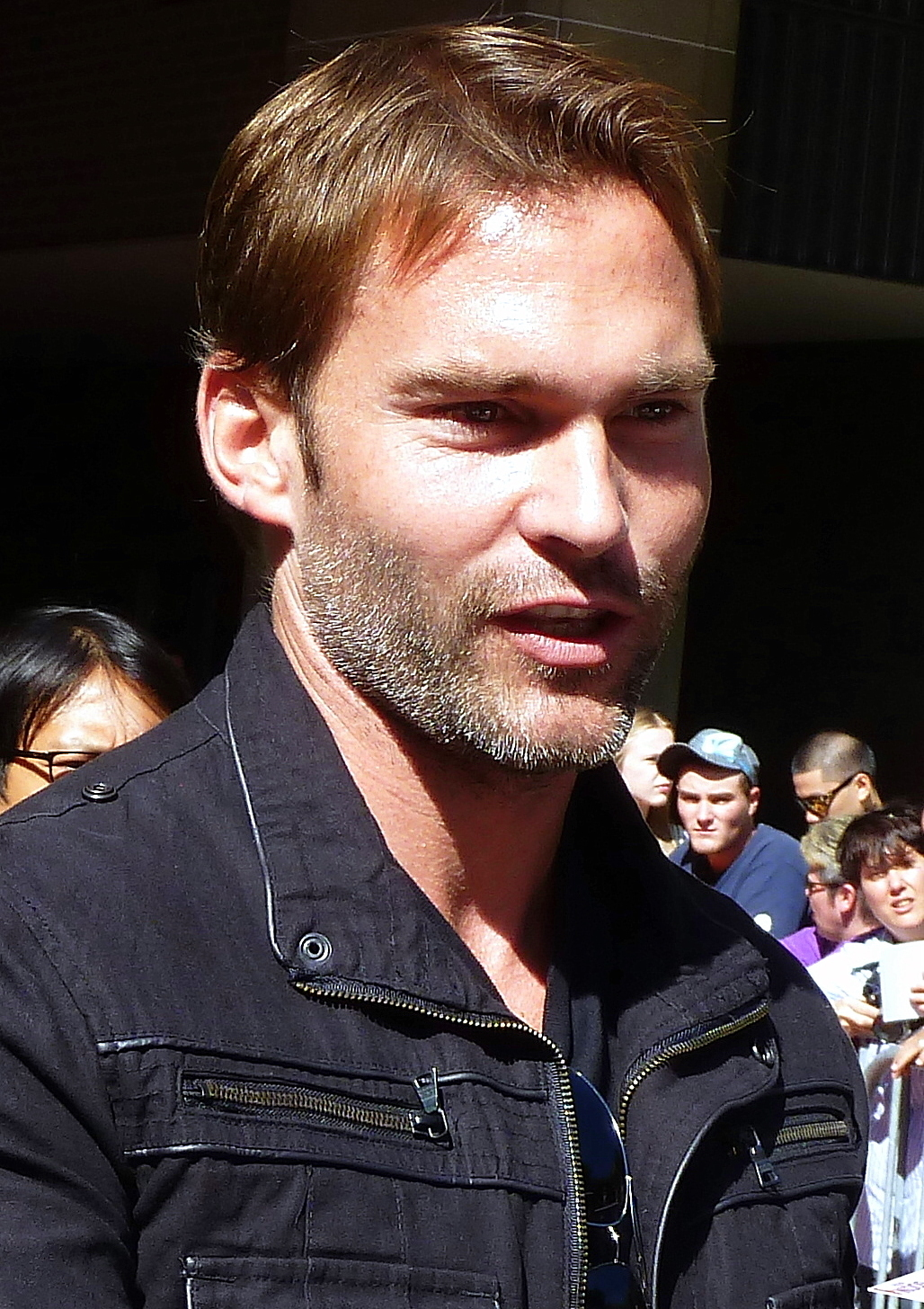
Seann William Scott portrays Billy Hitchcock in Final Destination.

- Portrayed by Seann William Scott
- Appeared in: Final Destination, Final Destination 2 (photo only), and Final Destination 5 (archive footage)
- Status: Deceased

William "Billy" Hitchcock is one of the survivors of the Flight 180 explosion, and the fourth survivor to die.

Billy is a student at Mt. Abraham High School, and the main target of Carter Horton's bullying. He was supposed to board Flight 180 with his classmates for their senior trip to Paris, but got stuck in the airport's restroom before departure. Billy arrives just as Alex Browning and Carter are being thrown off the plane, and is forced off as well after being caught in the commotion. Moments later, a horrified Billy witnesses the plane explode in mid-air.

One month later, Billy attends a memorial service for the plane's victims. He later encounters the other survivors at a café, where they witness Terry Chaney's death. After Valerie Lewton's death, Billy reunites with Alex, Carter, and Clear Rivers to discuss what they should do to avoid their deaths. While driving through town, Carter learns that he is next on Death's list and begins to drive recklessly. He parks his car on railroad tracks and becomes trapped, but Alex saves him just before the car is smashed by an oncoming train. Billy warns Alex and Clear to stay away from Carter until he is suddenly decapitated by flying scrap metal from the car wreckage. As a result, Alex realizes that if someone intervenes, Death will move on to the next survivor on the list.

In Final Destination 2, Billy is mentioned by Thomas Burke, who reveals he avoided a fatal shootout after being called to clean up Billy's remains. During the opening credits of The Final Destination, Billy's death is shown in X-ray format. In Final Destination 5, Billy appears through archive footage as he leaves from Flight 180 and his death is shown in a montage before the end credits.

=== Blake Dreyer and Christa Marsh ===
- Portrayed by Christine Chatelain and Lisa Marie Caruk
- Appeared: in Final Destination
- Status: Both deceased

Blake Dreyer and Christa Marsh are students at Mt. Abraham High School, and casualties of the Flight 180 explosion.

Blake and Christa are best friends and board the plane together for their senior trip to Paris. Tod Waggner had a crush on both Blake and Christa, and planned to spend the flight trying to hook up with them. Before the plane's departure, Alex Browning has a premonition that the plane will explode in mid-air. He awakens as Blake and Christa ask him to switch seats, just like in the vision, and panics. Disregarding Alex's warning, Blake and Christa stay on the plane and are killed among 285 other passengers.

Later on, Alex realizes that it is not his turn to die, since he never switched seats with Blake and Christa, like he did in the vision.

=== Carter Horton ===
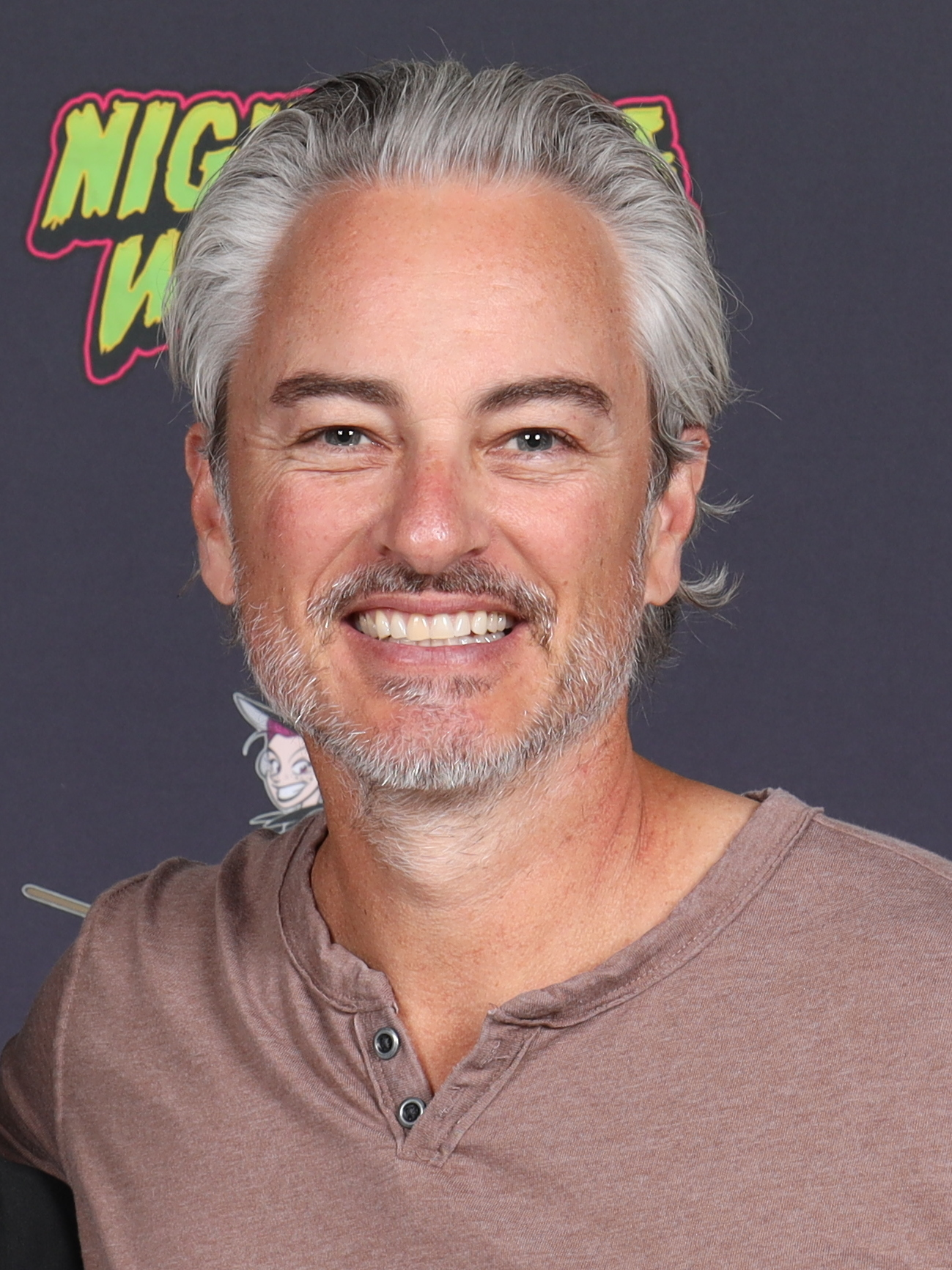
Kerr Smith portrays Carter Horton in Final Destination.

- Portrayed by Kerr Smith
- Appeared: in Final Destination, Final Destination 2 (photo only), and Final Destination 5 (archive footage)
- Status: Deceased

Carter Horton is one of the survivors of the Flight 180 explosion, and the fifth survivor to die.

Carter is a student at Mt. Abraham High School, and Alex Browning's arch-rival. He boards Flight 180 with his girlfriend Terry Chaney for their senior trip to Paris. When Alex warns everyone that the plane will explode, Carter believes it is a joke and a fight breaks out between them. They are both thrown off the plane along with Terry and several other classmates, all of whom witness the plane explode. One month later, Carter attends a memorial service for the plane's victims, where he refuses to admit that Alex saved his life. He later encounters the survivors and confronts Alex at a café where they all witness Terry's death, leaving Carter devastated.

After Alex explains that Death is still after them, they reunite with Clear Rivers and Billy Hitchcock. Carter learns that he is next on Death's list and drives recklessly through town. He parks his car on railroad tracks, wanting to die on his own terms, but later changes his mind. When his seat belt jams, Alex saves him before the car is smashed by an oncoming train; Death then skips him and kills Billy, the next survivor on the list. Six months later, Carter visits Paris with Alex and Clear to celebrate their survival. When they realize that Death has still not skipped Alex, Carter saves him from being hit by a falling sign. Alex reveals that Death has now skipped him and Carter asks who is the next to die just before the sign swings back down and kills him.

In Final Destination 2, Carter is mentioned by Rory Peters, who reveals that he decided not to attend a theater—which later collapsed on the guests—after witnessing Carter's death. In Final Destination 5, Carter appears through archive footage as he and Alex are removed from Flight 180 along with their other classmates.

=== Clear Rivers ===
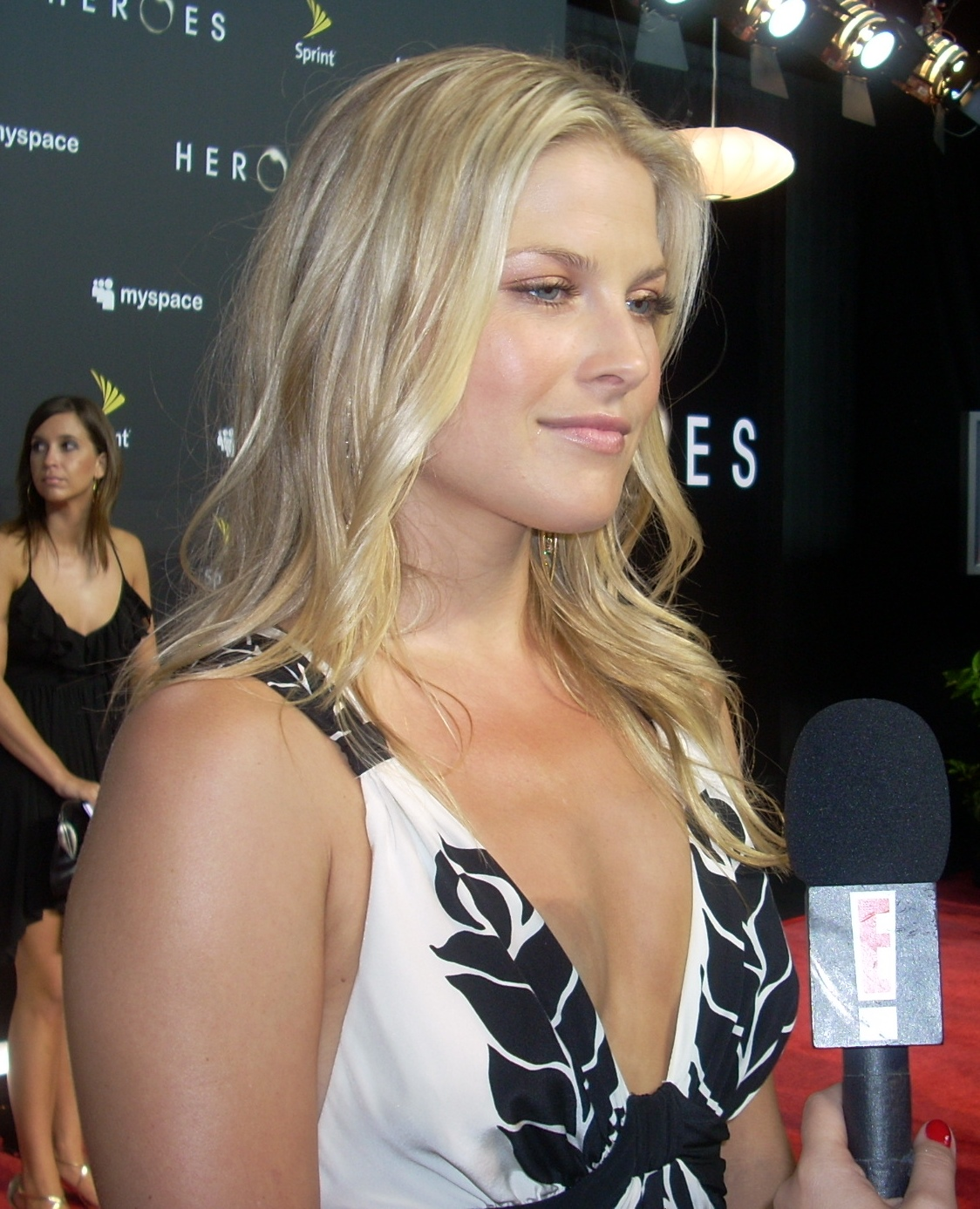
Ali Larter portrays Clear Rivers in Final Destination and Final Destination 2.

- Portrayed by Ali Larter
- Appeared in: Final Destination, Final Destination 2, and Final Destination 5 (archive footage)
- Status: Deceased

Clear Marie Rivers is one of the survivors of the Flight 180 explosion, and the seventh and final survivor to die.

Clear is a student at Mt. Abraham High School who boards Flight 180 with her classmates for their senior trip to Paris. When Alex Browning warns everyone that the plane will explode, Clear is the only one who believes him and voluntarily leaves the plane. She witnesses as it explodes in mid-air shortly after and, one month later, attends a memorial service for the plane's victims. Clear thanks Alex for saving her life and gives him a rose to show her gratitude. After Tod Waggner's death, Clear and Alex sneak into the local funeral home to examine his corpse. They meet William Bludworth, who warns them that Death is still after the survivors.

Clear is initially skeptical of Bludworth's warning until the survivors begin to die one by one in bizarre accidents. When Alex saves Carter Horton, he distances himself from Clear, believing that he is next on Death's list. However, Alex later learns that Clear is actually next and rushes to her house. Meanwhile, Clear gets trapped in her car—which leaks gasoline and is surrounded by live wires—until Alex arrives to save her. He grabs the wires, allowing Clear to escape from the car before it explodes, and Death skips her. Six months later, Clear, Alex, and Carter travel to Paris to celebrate their survival; after Alex narrowly avoids Death, they both witness Carter's death and realize that Death's plan is still in action.

In Final Destination 2, it is revealed that Clear is the last survivor of Flight 180 after Alex was bludgeoned to death by a dislodged brick from a nearby building. She has committed herself to a mental institution to protect herself from Death. Clear is visited by Kimberly Corman, who asks her to save the survivors of the Route 23 pile-up. Clear initially refuses, but later decides to help and introduces Kimberly and Thomas Burke to Bludworth, who explains that only "new life" can defeat Death.

Bludworth's information leads them to believe that if pregnant survivor Isabella Hudson has her baby it will ruin Death's plan, and the remaining survivors will all be safe. Clear, Kimberly, and Burke manage to save Isabella and her baby, but Kimberly later realizes that she was never meant to die in the pile-up, and was therefore never on Death's list. Clear searches for Eugene Dix at the hospital, but accidentally causes his room to explode from an oxygen combustion, killing them both.

During the opening credits of The Final Destination, Clear's death is shown in X-ray format. In Final Destination 5, Clear appears through archive footage as she leaves from Flight 180 and her death is shown in a montage before the end credits.

=== George Waggner ===
- Portrayed by Brendan Fehr
- Appeared in: Final Destination and Final Destination 5 (archive footage)
- Status: Deceased

George Waggner is a student at Mt. Abraham High School, and a casualty of the Flight 180 explosion.

George boards the plane with his younger brother Tod Waggner and their best friend Alex Browning for their senior trip to Paris. He instructs Tod to go check on Alex after the latter is thrown off the plane. George stays on the plane and is killed among 286 other passengers. His death infuriates the Waggner household, who blame Alex for the incident.

In Final Destination 5, George is briefly seen through archive footage as one of the passengers of Flight 180.

=== Larry Murnau ===
- Portrayed by Forbes Angus
- Appeared in: Final Destination and Final Destination 5 (archive footage)
- Status: Deceased

Larry Murnau is a French teacher at Mt. Abraham High School, and a casualty of the Flight 180 explosion.

Murnau is fluent in the French language and was in charge of guiding the senior trip to Paris. After several students are removed from the plane, Valerie Lewton volunteers to stay behind and look after them until the next flight's departure. Because Murnau knows French a lot more than she does, Lewton sends him back on the plane and he is killed among 286 other passengers. His death affected Lewton the most, who became guilt-ridden, holding herself personally responsible for the incident.

In Final Destination 5, Murnau is briefly seen through archive footage as one of the passengers of Flight 180.

=== Agents Schreck and Weine ===
- Portrayed by Roger Guenveur Smith and Daniel Roebuck
- Appeared in: Final Destination
- Status: Alive

Special Agent Schreck and Special Agent Weine are FBI agents and partners.

Following the explosion of Flight 180, Schreck and Weine interrogate the survivors, and become suspicious of Alex Browning. They keep a close eye on him, and their suspicion grows when the survivors begin to die one by one. Later, Schreck and Weine attempt to arrest Alex and chase him into the woods, but after they witness him rescue Clear Rivers, Alex is cleared of any wrongdoing.

=== Terry Chaney ===
- Portrayed by Amanda Detmer
- Appeared in: Final Destination, Final Destination 2 (photo only), and Final Destination 5 (archive footage)
- Status: Deceased

Terry Chaney is one of the survivors of the Flight 180 explosion, and the second survivor to die.

Terry is a student at Mt. Abraham High School, and Carter Horton's girlfriend. She boards Flight 180 with Carter for their senior trip to Paris. When Alex Browning warns everyone that the plane will explode, Carter starts a fight with him and both are thrown off the plane. Terry follows Carter off as well, and witnesses the plane explode in mid-air shortly after.

One month later, Terry attends a memorial service for the plane's victims where she notices that Carter seems more interested in fighting with Alex. Later, while driving past a café, Carter and Terry encounter Alex and the former instigates another fight. After berating Carter, Terry storms off in anger, and is fatally run over by a speeding bus.

In Final Destination 2, Terry is mentioned by Kat Jennings, who reveals she was on the bus that killed Terry. As a result, she avoided attending a bed and breakfast where a gas leak suffocated the guests staying. During the opening credits of The Final Destination, Terry's death is referenced. In Final Destination 5, Terry appears through archive footage as she leaves from Flight 180.

=== Tod Waggner ===
- Portrayed by Chad Donella
- Appeared in: Final Destination, Final Destination 2 (photo only), and Final Destination 5 (archive footage)
- Status: Deceased

Tod Waggner is one of the survivors of the Flight 180 explosion, and the first survivor to die.

Tod is a student at Mt. Abraham High School, and Alex Browning's best friend. He boards Flight 180 with Alex and his older brother George Waggner for their senior trip to Paris. When Alex has a premonition that the plane will explode and is thrown off, George instructs Tod to go check on him. Moments later, a horrified Tod witnesses the plane explode in mid-air. His friendship with Alex becomes distant as Tod's parents blame him for George's death.

One month later, Tod delivers a farewell speech at a memorial service for the plane's victims. That same night, while Tod is in his bathroom, the toilet begins to leak and he slips, falling into the bathtub. A clothes line wraps around his neck and slowly suffocates him as he desperately attempts to free himself, but eventually dies from asphyxia. Tod's death is ruled a suicide; however, Alex refuses to believe that Tod killed himself and sneaks into the funeral home to examine his corpse.

In Final Destination 2, Tod is mentioned by Kimberly Corman, who reveals that she was distracted by a news broadcast on his death, and was therefore not targeted by the car thieves who killed her mother. During the opening credits of The Final Destination, Tod's death is shown in X-ray format. In Final Destination 5, Tod appears through archive footage as he leaves from Flight 180.

=== Valerie Lewton ===
- Portrayed by Kristen Cloke
- Appeared in: Final Destination, Final Destination 2 (photo only), and Final Destination 5 (archive footage)
- Status: Deceased

Ms. Valerie Lewton is one of the survivors of the Flight 180 explosion, and the third survivor to die.

Lewton is a teacher at Mt. Abraham High School who was in charge of chaperoning the senior trip to Paris. After several students are removed from the plane, she volunteers to stay at the airport and look after them, convincing French teacher Larry Murnau to get back on the plane. Lewton witnesses as it explodes in mid-air shortly after and shows extreme guilt for inadvertently being responsible for Murnau's death; she also becomes distrustful and terrified of Alex Browning due to his premonition.

One month later, Lewton attends a memorial service for the victims. After Tod Waggner and Terry Chaney are killed in bizarre accidents, she ultimately decides to leave town in order to restart her life. While packing her bags, she makes coffee but gets startled and throws the coffee out of her mug. Lewton then puts vodka and ice in the mug; the sudden cooling cracks the mug, and its contents leak out all over the floor and into a computer monitor, causing a short-circuit. The computer explodes and shrapnel flies into her neck. Sparks from the explosion ignite the trail of vodka, which leads to a house fire. A heavily injured Lewton falls and reaches for a rag sitting on top of a rack of knives on a counter, but it falls over and a knife impales her in the chest.

Upon learning that Lewton is next on Death's list, Alex arrives to save her, but the oven explodes and a chair falls on her. It pushes the knife even further into her chest and kills Lewton instantly. The fire eventually spreads and causes a massive explosion which destroys her whole house, as Alex flees to warn the remaining survivors.

In Final Destination 2, Lewton is mentioned by Eugene Dix, who reveals that he was substituting her at Mt. Abraham High School after her death, when a homicidal student from his previous job killed his substitute. During the opening credits of The Final Destination, Lewton's death is shown in X-ray format. In Final Destination 5, Lewton appears through archive footage as she leaves from Flight 180 and her death is shown in a montage before the end credits.

=== William Bludworth ===
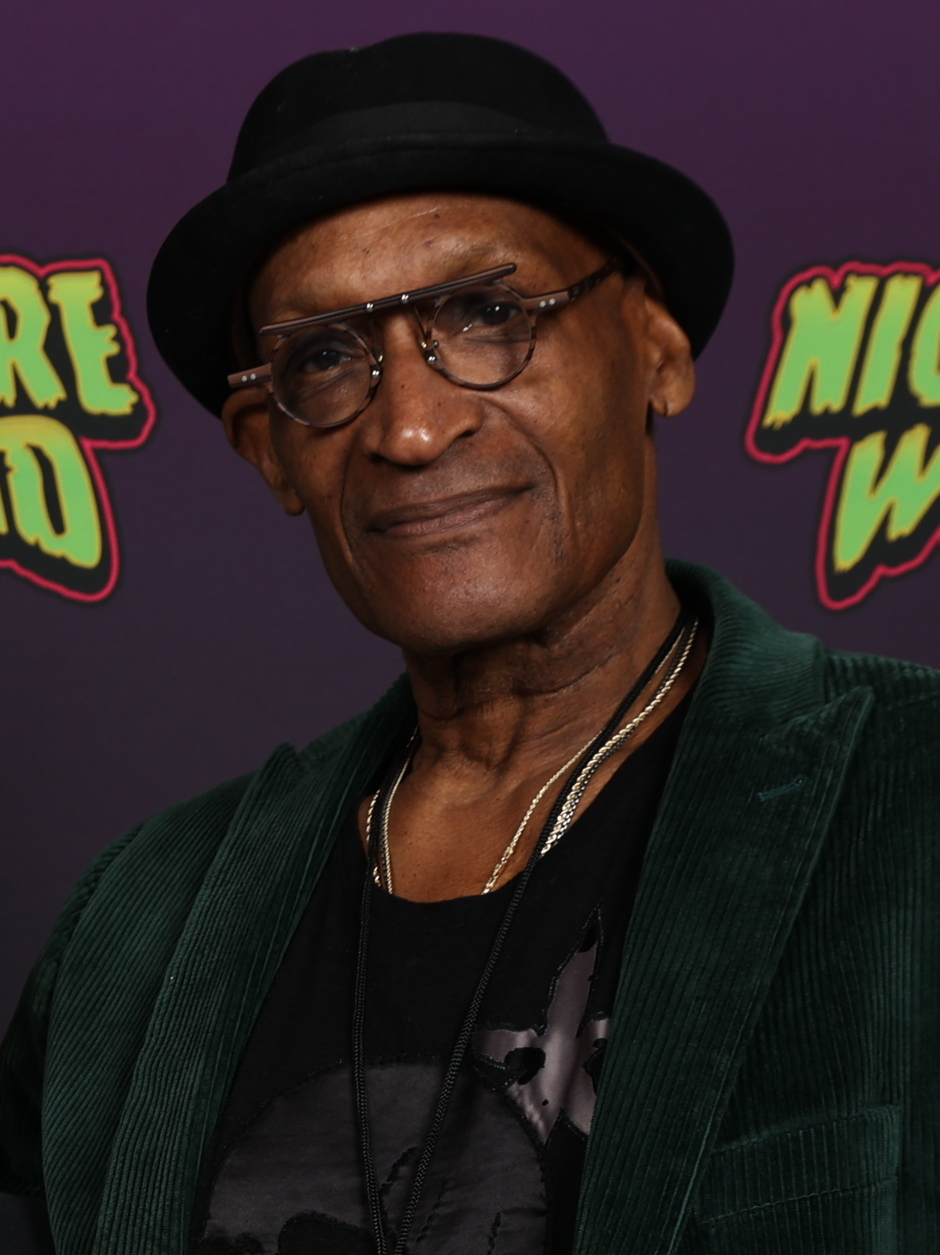
Tony Todd portrays William Bludworth in Final Destination, Final Destination 2, Final Destination 5, and Final Destination Bloodlines. Additionally, he made a voice cameo in Final Destination 3.

- Portrayed by Tony Todd
- Appeared in: Final Destination, Final Destination 2, Final Destination 5, and Final Destination Bloodlines
- Status: Deceased

William John Bludworth, or J. B., is a mortician and owner of Bludworth Funeral Homes, who has expert knowledge of Death and its forces or capacities. He is also one of the survivors of the 1968 Skyview Restaurant Tower collapse.

In Final Destination, Alex Browning and Clear Rivers sneak inside the funeral home to examine Tod Waggner's corpse. Bludworth catches them and explains that they have ruined Death's plan, and now it is claiming the lives of those who were meant to die in the Flight 180 explosion unless they can find a way to cheat Death in order to save themselves.

In Final Destination 2, Bludworth is revisited by Clear, along with Kimberly Corman and Thomas Burke, to acquire more knowledge. He explains that only "new life" can defeat Death, leading the trio to believe that if pregnant survivor Isabella Hudson has her baby it will interfere with Death's list and the remaining survivors of Route 23 pile-up will all be safe.

In Final Destination 5, Bludworth ominously watches the survivors of the North Bay Bridge collapse at a memorial service for the victims. After Isaac Palmer's death, he is confronted by Sam Lawton, Molly Harper, Peter Friedkin, and Nathan Sears, warning them about Death. Bludworth also explains that if they kill someone else they can acquire that person's remaining lifespan.

In Final Destination Bloodlines, Bludworth is visited by Iris Campbell's relatives Stefani Reyes, Charlie Reyes, Darlene Campbell, Erik Campbell, and Bobby Campbell at the hospital where he works. He reveals himself to be a survivor of the 1968 Skyview Restaurant Tower collapse because he accompanied his singer mother, who nicknamed him J. B., at the tower's opening ceremony. Bludworth was among those who heeded Iris's warnings and was subsequently added to Death's list.

Some time later, Bludworth met Iris again and they both worked together to find a way to save themselves from their fate by compiling information about the several accidents in which the tower's survivors and their descendants died over the years, to cheat Death and prolong their lifespan. He explains again that there are two methods to disrupt Death's plan: by killing someone else to acquire that person's remaining lifespan or by creating "new life", and reveals that one survivor—Kimberly—achieved it.

Bludworth reveals that now Iris is dead, he will die once Death kills all of Iris's remaining bloodline, for he was the last to die in Iris' premonition. He warns Stefani that her entire family is doomed and that it is best for them to simply wait for Death to claim their lives.

== Introduced in Final Destination 2 ==
The Route 23 pile-up survivors (from left to right): Kimberly Corman (A. J. Cook), Tim Carpenter (James Kirk), Nora Carpenter (Lynda Boyd), Thomas Burke (Michael Landes), Rory Peters (Jonathan Cherry), Eugene Dix (T. C. Carson), and Kat Jennings (Keegan Connor Tracy). Survivors Evan Lewis (David Paetkau) and Isabella Hudson (Justina Machado) are absent from the scene.

Final Destination 2 is the second film in the Final Destination series and is set one year after the Flight 180 explosion. It focuses on college student Kimberly Corman, who has a premonition about a deadly highway pile-up caused by a logging truck. She prevents eight other people—high school teacher Eugene Dix, widow mother Nora Carpenter, Nora's fifteen-year-old son Tim Carpenter, businesswoman Kat Jennings, lottery winner Evan Lewis, stoner Rory Peters, state trooper Thomas Burke, and pregnant Isabella Hudson—from entering the highway just before the pile-up occurs.

After Death begins to claim the lives of the survivors in the reverse order they should have died on the pile-up, Kimberly and Burke recruit Flight 180's last survivor Clear Rivers to help them find a way to cheat Death once and for all.

=== Brian Gibbons ===
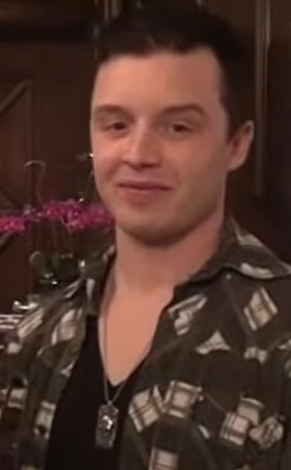
Noel Fisher portrays Brian Gibbons in Final Destination 2.

- Portrayed by Noel Fisher
- Appeared in: Final Destination 2
- Status: Deceased

Brian Gibbons is a teenage farmer from Greenwood Lake, New York. Although he is originally not on Death's list, his death is prevented by Rory Peters, and Brian is subsequently added to the list.

After Kat Jennings' SUV crashes onto the Gibbons farm, Brian and his parents try to help the Route 23 survivors out. In the ensuing chaos, Rory pulls Brian out of the path of a speeding news van, and he is unknowingly added to Death's list. Some time later, during a picnic with his parents, Kimberly Corman, Thomas Burke, and Kimberly's father Michael Corman, the propane tank of a barbecue grill erupts and blows Brian to pieces. His arm lands on his mother's plate as she screams in horror.

In The Final Destination, Brian's death is mentioned in a newspaper article.

=== Dano, Frankie, and Shaina ===
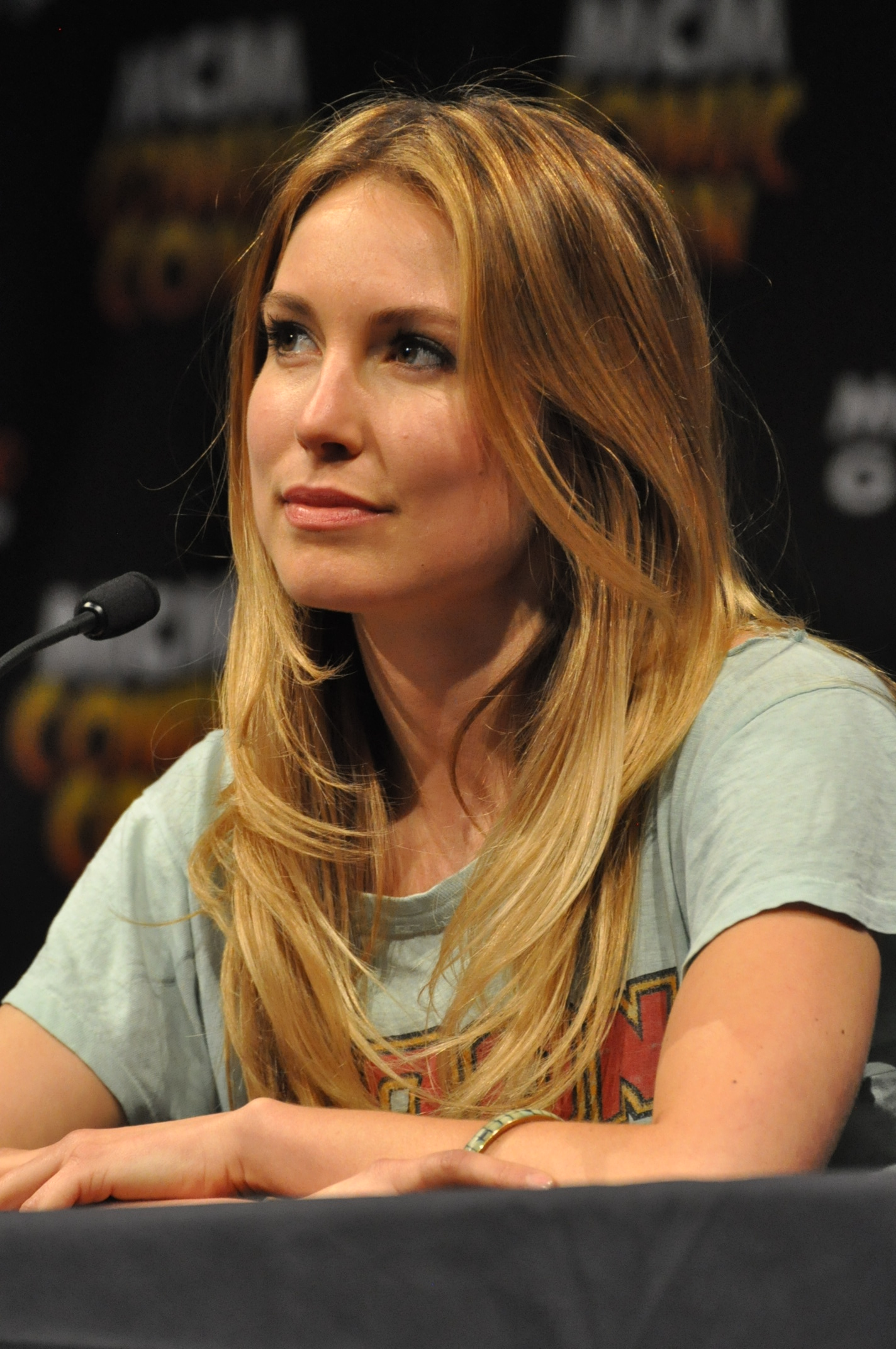
Sarah Carter portrays Shaina in Final Destination 2.

- Portrayed by Alejandro Rae, Shaun Sipos, and Sarah Carter
- Appeared in: Final Destination 2 and Final Destination 5 (archive footage)
- Status: All deceased

Dano, Frankie, and Shaina are college students from White Plains, New York, and casualties of the Route 23 pile-up.

Dano, Frankie, and Shaina go on a road trip to Daytona Beach, Florida with their friend Kimberly Corman for spring break. En route, Kimberly has a premonition about a massive pile-up, in which a semi-truck smashes into her SUV, killing all four of them. When Kimberly stalls her SUV to prevent other people from entering the highway, Thomas Burke pushes her out of the way as Dano, Frankie, and Shaina are killed by the same truck from Kimberly's premonition.

During the opening credits of The Final Destination, their death is referenced. In Final Destination 5, their death is shown in a montage before the end credits.

=== Ellen Kalarjian ===
- Portrayed by Enid-Raye Adams
- Appeared in: Final Destination 2
- Status: Alive

Dr. Ellen Kalarjian is a physician who works at Lakeview Hospital in Greenwood Lake, New York.

When Kimberly Corman has a premonition of what she believes is Dr. Kalarjian "strangling" pregnant survivor Isabella Hudson during labor, she is requested by Isabella's obstetrician and Thomas Burke immobilizes her as Isabella gives birth. After Clear Rivers and Eugene Dix are killed in a room explosion, Dr. Kalarjian brings a crash cart to the victims. Moments later, she resuscitates Kimberly from drowning in a lake, which turns out to be the actual premonition regarding "new life".

In a non-canon DVD bonus scene of Final Destination 3, Dr. Kalarjian is mentioned in a newspaper article that reveals she confirmed Kimberly's and Burke's deaths in a bizarre accident involving a woodchipper at a hardware store. In The Final Destination, Dr. Kalarjian is again mentioned in another newspaper article.

=== Eugene Dix ===
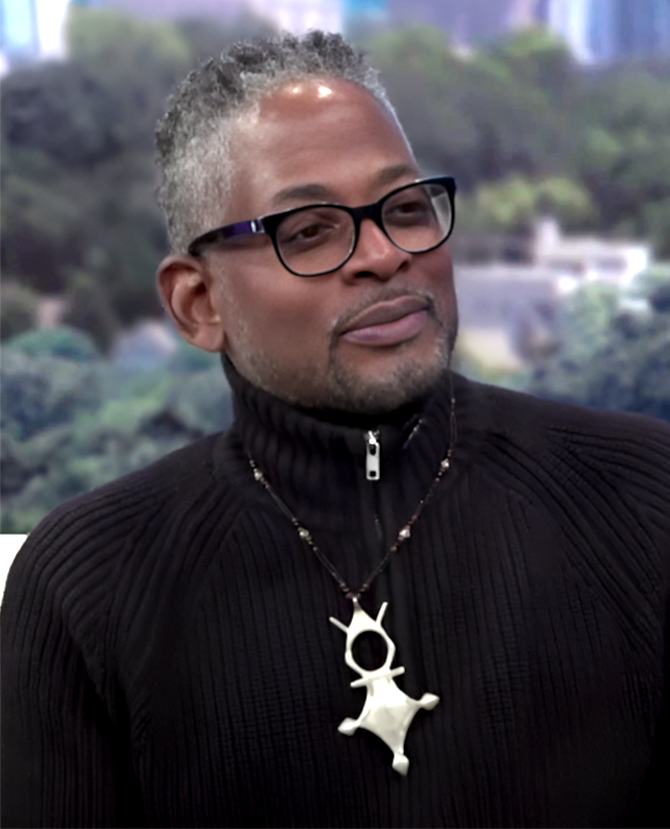
T. C. Carson portrays Eugene Dix in Final Destination 2.

- Portrayed by T. C. Carson
- Appeared in: Final Destination 2 and Final Destination 5 (archive footage)
- Status: Deceased

Eugene Dix is one of the survivors of the Route 23 pile-up, and the sixth and final survivor to die.

Eugene is a high school teacher who, prior to the incident, was substituting Valerie Lewton at Mt. Abraham High School when a student from his previous school fatally stabbed his substitute teacher during class. Kimberly Corman has a premonition about a deadly pile-up on Route 23—in which Eugene's motorcycle crushes his torso after he skids across the road—and prevents him and several other people from entering the highway just as the vision turns into a reality.

Although he is initially skeptical that Death is still after him, Eugene meets up with the other survivors at Thomas Burke's apartment, where he witnesses Nora Carpenter's death. Horrified, Eugene takes Burke's gun and attempts to commit suicide, wanting to die on his own terms, but it fails despite the fact the gun was fully loaded. Clear Rivers explains that it was because it was not his turn to die yet. Afterwards, the remaining survivors leave to find Isabella Hudson.

On the way, Kat Jennings's SUV nearly collides with Isabella's van and they swerve onto the Gibbons farm. Several PVC pipes penetrate the vehicle and puncture Eugene's lung; he is quickly rushed to Lakeview Hospital in an ambulance where he learns from a news broadcast that Kat and Rory Peters have already been killed, making him the next person on Death's list. Numbed by hypoxia, Eugene helplessly watches as the vents close, his oxygen tanks' tubes snap, and his defibrillator's power plug disengages. However, the machine's emergency mode activates and revives him, but Clear abruptly opens his door—which completely detaches the plug, creating a spark that ignites the oxygen—and incinerates them both in a subsequent explosion.

During the opening credits of The Final Destination, Eugene's death is shown in X-ray format. In Final Destination 5, Eugene's death is shown in a montage before the end credits.

=== Evan Lewis ===
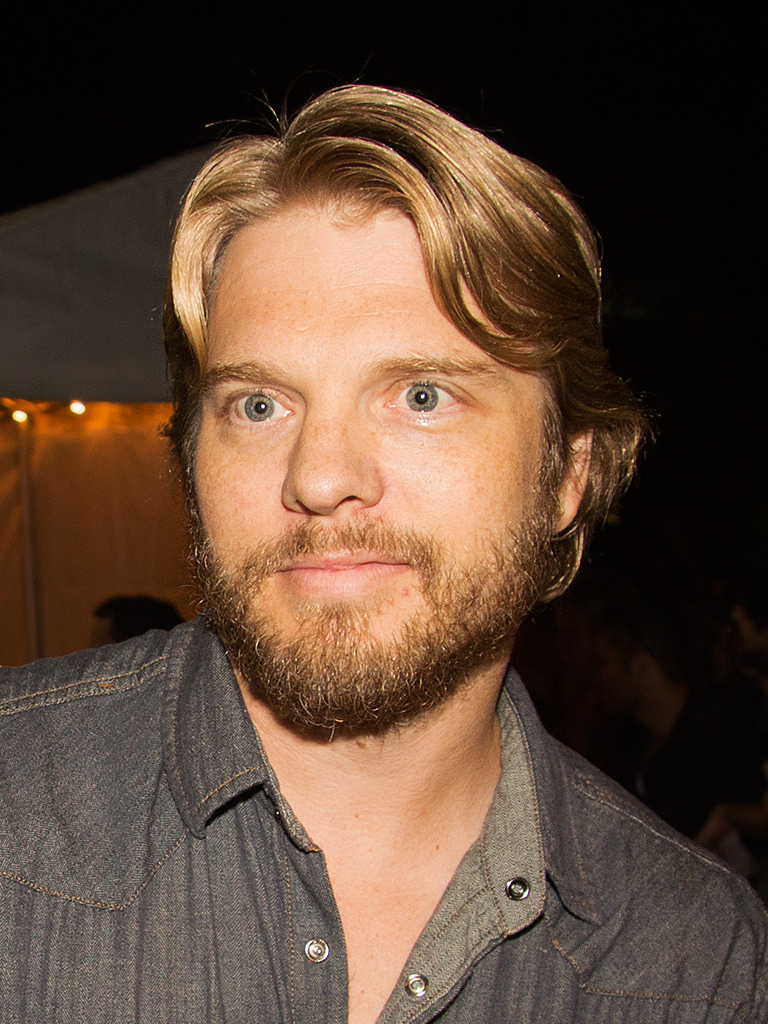
David Paetkau portrays Evan Lewis in Final Destination 2.

- Portrayed by David Paetkau
- Appeared in: Final Destination 2 and Final Destination 5 (archive footage)
- Status: Deceased

Evan Lewis is one of the survivors of the Route 23 pile-up, and the first survivor to die.

Evan is a recent lottery winner who was deemed one of the luckiest people alive until his death. Kimberly Corman has a premonition about a deadly pile-up on Route 23—in which Evan's new car crashes into a logging truck's oil tank, engulfing him in flames before a semi-trailer truck runs him over—and prevents him from entering the highway just as the vision turns into a reality.

He is brought to the police station for questioning, but is released and returns to his apartment. Evan heats up some Chinese noodles in the microwave, unaware that a refrigerator magnet has fallen in the box, and fries mozzarella sticks on the stove. While trying on his jewelry, the microwave sparks and causes him to drop his new ring down the sink. Evan reaches into the drain to retrieve it, but his watch causes his hand to get stuck. The stove starts to flare and he attempts to put out the fire with his shirt, inadvertently causing the pan to fall over and set the entire apartment on fire. When Evan finally frees his hand, he tries to use a fire extinguisher, but it stalls.

Desperate, Evan smashes the windows, and leaves seconds before his kitchen explodes. He climbs down the fire escape, but as he walks away, slips on spaghetti—which he threw out the window moments earlier—and the ladder falls, impaling his right eye. Evan's death alarms the other survivors, who watch a news coverage of the incident.

During the opening credits of The Final Destination, Evan's death is shown in X-ray format. In Final Destination 5, Evan's death is shown in a montage before the end credits.

=== Isabella Hudson ===
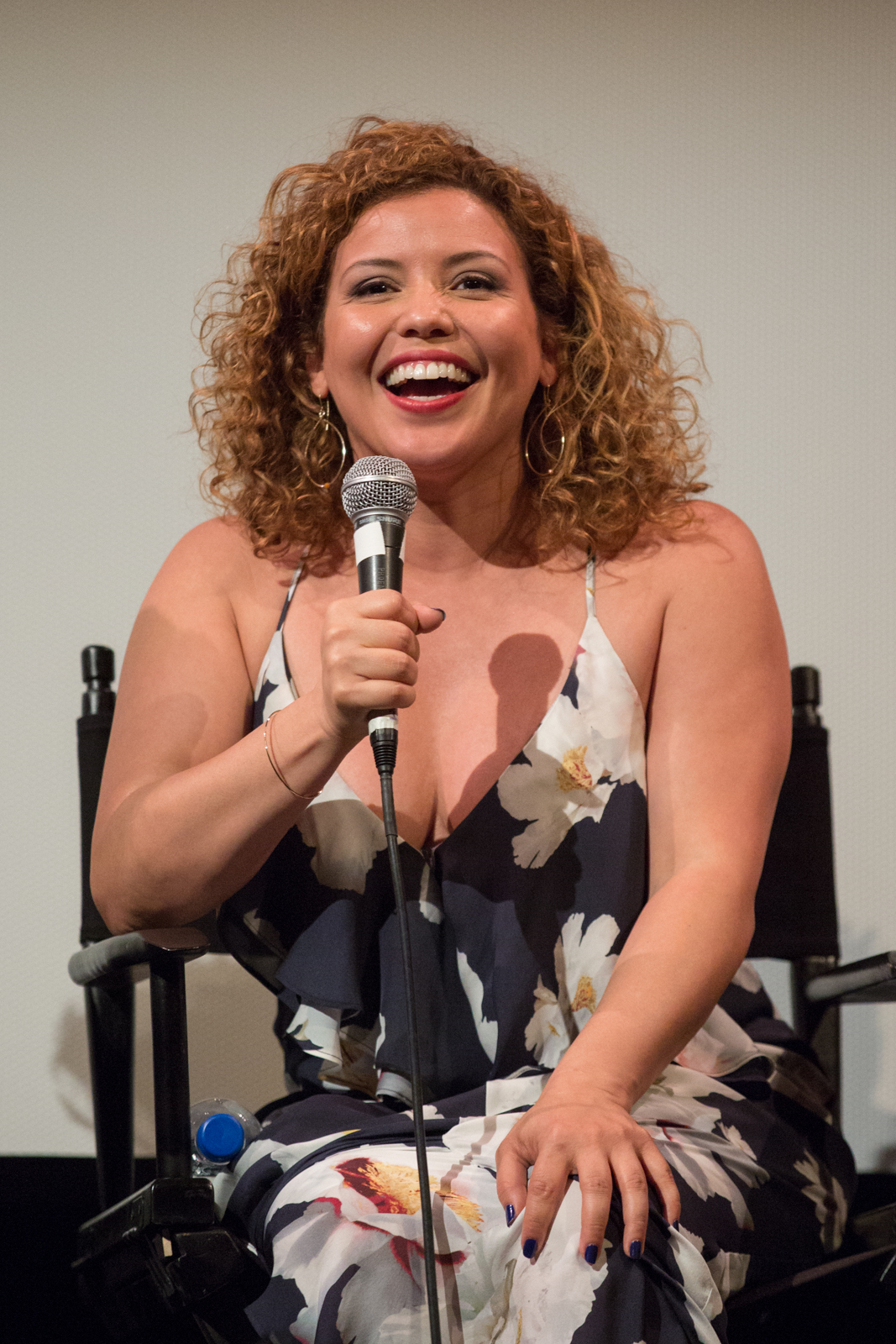
Justina Machado portrays Isabella Hudson in Final Destination 2.

- Portrayed by Justina Machado
- Appeared in: Final Destination 2
- Status: Alive

Isabella Hudson is one of the survivors of the Route 23 pile-up.

Isabella lives in New York City with her husband, and is nine-months pregnant with a boy. Kimberly Corman has a premonition about a deadly pile-up on Route 23 and blocks the entrance ramp, preventing Isabella and several other people from entering the highway before her vision turns into a reality.

When Kimberly realizes that Death is still after the survivors, she learns that "new life" can defeat Death. Isabella is incarcerated by a deputy officer under Thomas Burke's orders to protect her until she has her baby. While in jail, Isabella's water breaks and the deputy rushes her to Lakeview Hospital. On the way, Kat Jennings's SUV almost collides with Isabella's van; nonetheless, she arrives at the hospital unharmed. At the hospital, Kimberly has another vision of what appears to be Isabella's physician, Ellen Kalarjian, "strangling" her and Burke stops Dr. Kalarjian from disrupting Isabella's pregnancy while she successfully delivers her infant son.

Kimberly and Burke believe that they have cheated Death, but then realize that Isabella was never meant to die in the pile-up, and was therefore not on Death's list, making their efforts futile as Clear Rivers and Eugene Dix are killed in an explosion.

=== Kat Jennings ===
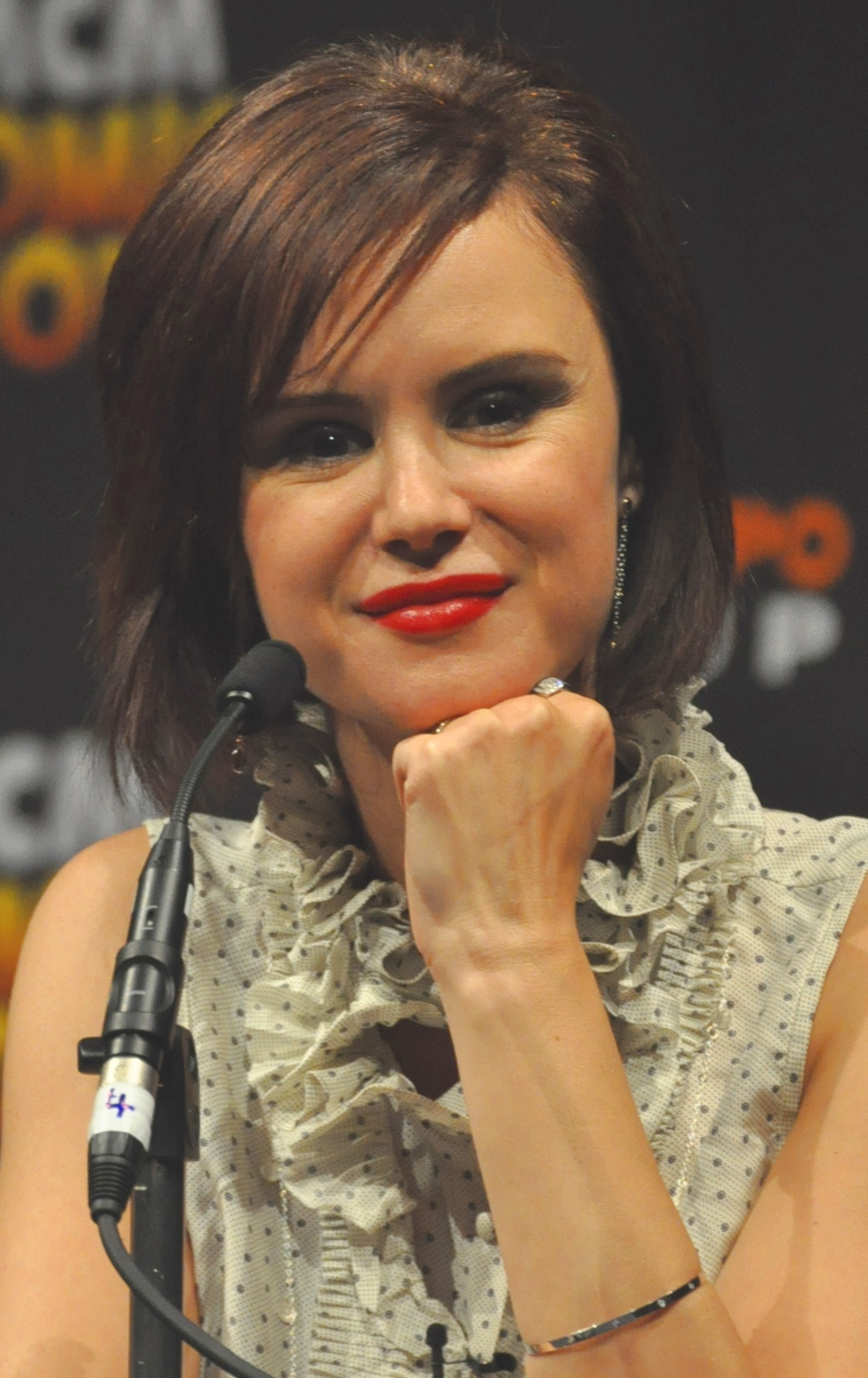
Keegan Connor Tracy portrays Kat Jennings in Final Destination 2.

- Portrayed by Keegan Connor Tracy
- Appeared in: Final Destination 2 and Final Destination 5 (archive footage)
- Status: Deceased

Kat Jennings is one of the survivors of the Route 23 pile-up, and the fourth survivor to die.

Kat is a successful marketing consultant for a business firm that, prior to the incident, was scheduled for a client meeting at a local bed and breakfast, but the bus where she was on fatally ran over Terry Chaney, and Kat avoided a gas leak that killed everyone in the lodge. Kimberly Corman has a premonition about a deadly pile-up on Route 23—in which Kat's SUV flips upside down, crushing her to death—and prevents her from entering the highway just as the vision turns into a reality.

She initially disregards Kimberly's theory that Death may still be after the survivors. Nonetheless, Kat meets up with them at Thomas Burke's apartment, where she and Clear Rivers attempt to save Nora Carpenter from being decapitated by an elevator, but are unable to. Kat offers to drive the remaining survivors in her SUV, but it suffers a blowout and nearly collides with Isabella Hudson's van, swerving onto the Gibbons farm. Kat's SUV is penetrated by PVC pipes, and she is trapped in her seat by a log. When a rescue worker tries to free her with the jaws of life, he inadvertently triggers the airbag, which pushes Kat's head into a pipe protruding from the headrest and kills her.

During the opening credits of The Final Destination, Kat's death is shown in X-ray format, although the pipe goes her head diagonally rather than straight through her forehead. In Final Destination 5, Kat's death is shown in a montage before the end credits.

=== Kimberly Corman ===
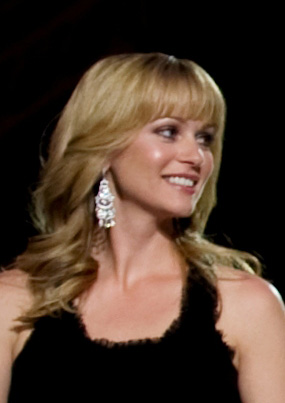
A. J. Cook portrays Kimberly Corman in Final Destination 2. Cook dyed her hair to avoid confusion with Ali Larter and Sarah Carter.

- Portrayed by A. J. Cook
- Appeared in: Final Destination 2 and Final Destination 3 (photo only, "Choose Their Fate" DVD bonus scene)
- Status: Alive

Kimberly Corman is the protagonist and visionary of Final Destination 2. She is one of the survivors of the Route 23 pile-up, and one of the only two survivors of Death's list.

Kimberly is a college student from White Plains, New York, who was on a road trip to Daytona Beach, Florida with her friends Dano, Frankie, and Shaina for spring break. One year earlier, she was supposed to have been killed in a mugging where her mother died, but was distracted by a news broadcast about Tod Waggner's death.

After stopping on the on-ramp to Route 23, Kimberly has a premonition about a deadly pile-up, in which several people—including her and her friends—are killed. She stalls her SUV to prevent those who would have died from entering the highway, but is saved by Thomas Burke while Dano, Frankie, and Shaina die after her vehicle is hit by a speeding semi-trailer truck.

Kimberly and the other survivors are brought to the police station for questioning, where she and Eugene Dix explain the similarities between their experience and the survivors of Flight 180. After Evan Lewis's death, Kimberly asks for help from Flight 180's last survivor Clear Rivers, who initially refuses, but later introduces her and Burke to William Bludworth. He explains that only "new life" can defeat Death, leading them to believe that if pregnant survivor Isabella Hudson has her baby, it will ruin Death's plan and they will all be safe.

Although Clear and the remaining survivors meet their demises, Kimberly and Burke manage to save Isabella, who successfully delivers her infant son. However, Kimberly realizes that Isabella was never on Death's list and attempts to sacrifice herself by driving a van into a lake to drown, but she is rescued by Burke and resuscitated by Ellen Kalarjian, thus granting her a "new life".

In Final Destination Bloodlines, when Stefani Reyes and her remaining relatives visit Bludworth at the hospital where he works, he reveals that one person—Kimberly—is known to have defeated Death by embracing it and being resuscitated by her doctor.

Kimberly's photo is also seen in a non-canon DVD bonus scene of Final Destination 3. In the scene, a newspaper article reveals that after the events of Final Destination 2, Kimberly and Burke were eventually killed after being knocked into a woodchipper at a hardware store. The canonicity of the bonus scene was subject of discussion until the sixth film.

=== Michael Corman ===
- Portrayed by Andrew Airlie
- Appeared in: Final Destination 2
- Status: Alive

Michael Corman is the father of Kimberly Corman, who has become very close with his daughter after her mother's death. He sends Kimberly off on her road trip with her friend Shaina. Michael is later seen comforting Kimberly at the police station after the Route 23 pile-up, and she confides in him her fear that Death might still be after the survivors.

He later accompanies Kimberly and Thomas Burke to a picnic with the Gibbons family, where they witness Brian Gibbons's death.

=== Nora Carpenter ===
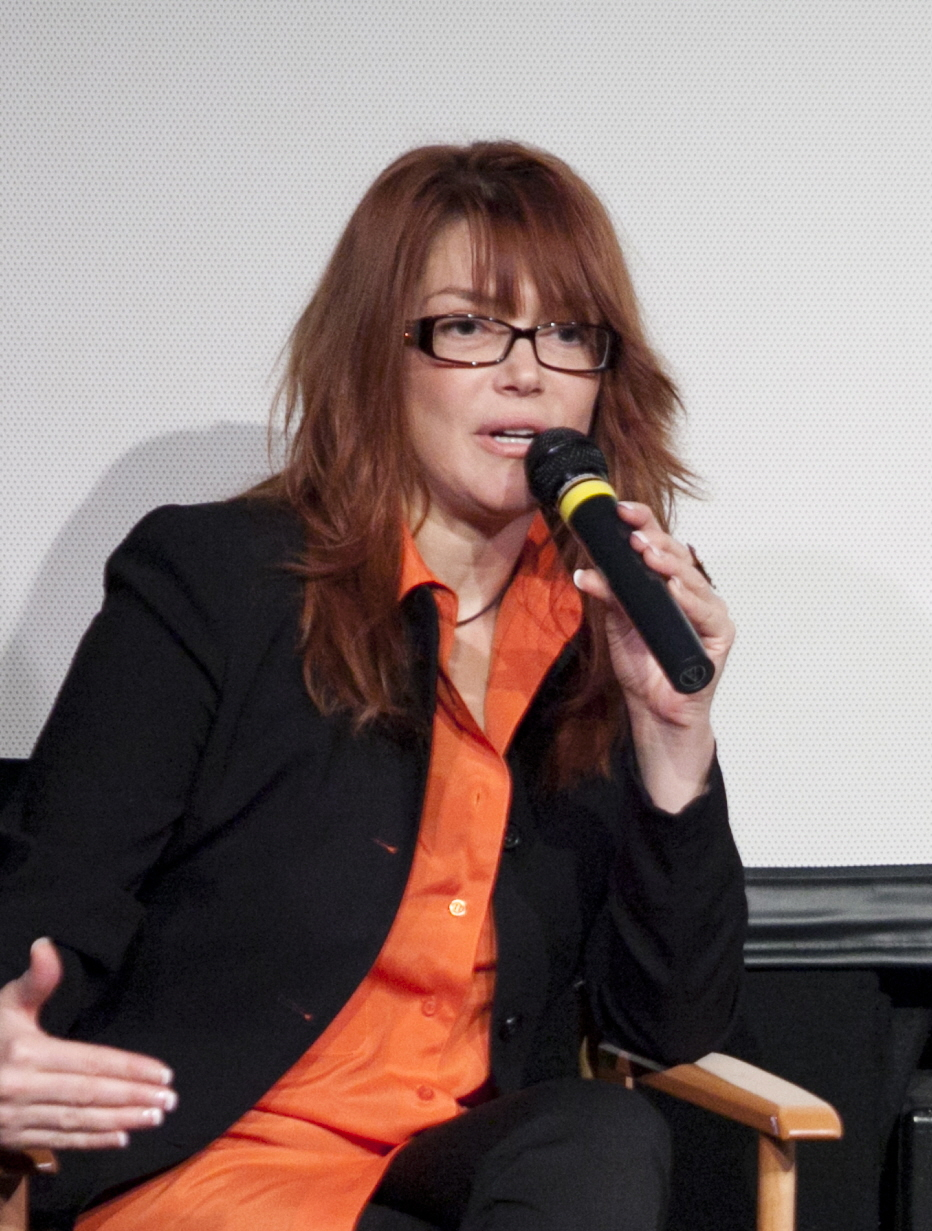
Lynda Boyd portrays Nora Carpenter in Final Destination 2.

- Portrayed by Lynda Boyd
- Appeared in: Final Destination 2 and Final Destination 5 (archive footage)
- Status: Deceased

Nora Carpenter is one of the survivors of the Route 23 pile-up, and the third survivor to die.

Nora is a widow mother who lives with her fifteen-year-old son Tim Carpenter, after her husband died four years earlier. Kimberly Corman has a premonition about a deadly pile-up on Route 23—in which Nora's car crashes into a log, killing both her and Tim—and prevents them from entering the highway just as the vision turns into a reality. She and the other survivors are brought to the police station for questioning, where Kimberly warns that Death may still be after them, but Nora dismisses her theory and leaves.

The following day, she witness Tim's death upon leaving his dentist appointment, which leaves her devastated. Nora later meets up with the remaining survivors at Thomas Burke's apartment, but leaves earlier to arrange Tim's funeral. While inside an elevator with Eugene Dix, her hair gets entangled with hooked prosthetic limbs from a man standing behind her. Nora's neck is trapped between the elevator doors as she tries to escape; the elevator then starts to move. Clear Rivers and Kat Jennings try to help her, but the elevator continues to rise until Nora is finally decapitated, much to Eugene's and the man's horror.

During the opening credits of The Final Destination, Nora's death is referenced. In Final Destination 5, Nora's death is shown in a montage before the end credits.

=== Rory Peters ===
- Portrayed by Jonathan Cherry
- Appeared in: Final Destination 2 and Final Destination 5 (archive footage)
- Status: Deceased

Rory Peters is one of the survivors of the Route 23 pile-up, and the fifth survivor to die.

Rory is a heavy drug addict who, prior to the incident, traveled to Paris, France, where he witnessed Carter Horton's death. Horrified by what he had seen, Rory decided to go to his hotel instead of attending a theater that later collapsed on the guests. Kimberly Corman has a premonition about a deadly pile-up on Route 23—in which Rory's car crashes into a garbage truck, killing him—and prevents him from entering the highway just as the vision turns into a reality.

He and the other survivors are brought to the police station for questioning, where Kimberly warns that Death may still be after the survivors, but Rory does not take her seriously. Nonetheless, he meets up with them at Thomas Burke's apartment and tries to stop a traumatized Eugene Dix from committing suicide after he witnessed Nora Carpenter's death. When the remaining survivors leave to find Isabella Hudson in Kat Jennings's SUV, the vehicle swerves onto the Gibbons farm and is penetrated by PVC pipes.

While there, Rory pulls teenage farmer Brian Gibbons out of the path of a speeding news van, unintentionally adding Brian to Death's list. He later asks Kimberly to hide his drug addictions from his mother if he dies. When Kat is killed, she drops a cigarette into a fuel leakage from the news van, which explodes and sends a barbed wire fence flying through Rory, dismembering him.

During the opening credits of The Final Destination, Rory's death is shown in X-ray format. In Final Destination 5, Rory's death is shown in a montage before the end credits.

=== Thomas Burke ===
- Portrayed by Michael Landes
- Appeared in: Final Destination 2, Final Destination 3 (photo only, "Choose Their Fate" DVD bonus scene), and Final Destination 5 (archive footage)
- Status: Alive

Thomas Burke is one of the survivors of the Route 23 pile-up, and one of the only two survivors of Death's list.

Burke is a New York state trooper in Westchester County, who also performs secondary tasks such as police investigation and crime scene cleanup. One year earlier, he was ordered to clean up Billy Hitchcock's remains, and therefore avoided a shootout in which his partner was killed. Kimberly Corman has a premonition about a deadly pile-up on Route 23—in which Burke is decapitated when a log crashes through his windshield—and prevents him from entering the highway just as the vision turns into a reality.

When the survivors are brought to the police station for questioning, Burke is the only one who considers Kimberly's theory that Death may still be after them. After Evan Lewis's death, Burke and Kimberly attempt to save the remaining survivors with the help of Clear Rivers. She introduces them to William Bludworth, who explains that only "new life" can defeat Death. It leads the trio to believe that if pregnant survivor Isabella Hudson has her baby, it will ruin Death's plan and they will all be safe.

Burke falsely accuses Isabella of stealing her van, and she is incarcerated. After the deaths of several other survivors, Isabella goes into labor, and Burke, Kimberly, and Clear rush to Lakeview Hospital, where they witness Isabella give birth. They believe they have finally cheated Death until Kimberly realizes that Isabella was never on Death's list, which leads to Clear's death. Kimberly sacrifices herself and drowns in a lake, but Burke saves her and she is resuscitated by Ellen Kalarjian, thus granting her a "new life".

In Final Destination Bloodlines, when Stefani Reyes and her remaining relatives visit Bludworth at the hospital where he works, he reveals that one person—Kimberly—is known to have defeated Death by embracing it and being resuscitated by her doctor. Although Burke's fate is not mentioned, it is heavily implied that he survived due to Kimberly disrupting Death's plan.

Burke's photo is also seen in a non-canon DVD bonus scene of Final Destination 3. In the scene, a newspaper article reveals that after the events of Final Destination 2, Kimberly and Burke were eventually killed after being knocked into a woodchipper at a hardware store. The canonicity of the bonus scene was subject of discussion until the sixth film.

In Final Destination 5, Burke's death in Kimberly's premonition is shown in a montage before the end credits.

=== Tim Carpenter ===
- Portrayed by James Kirk
- Appeared in: Final Destination 2 and Final Destination 5 (archive footage)
- Status: Deceased

Timothy "Tim" Carpenter is one of the survivors of the Route 23 pile-up, and the second survivor to die.

Tim is a fifteen-year-old boy who lives with his mother Nora Carpenter, after his father died four years earlier. Kimberly Corman has a premonition about a deadly pile-up on Route 23—in which Nora's car crashes into a log, killing both her and Tim—and prevents them from entering the highway just as the vision turns into a reality. He and the other survivors are brought to the police station for questioning, where Kimberly warns that Death may still be after them, but Tim ignores her and leaves.

The following day, Tim and Nora go to his dentist appointment, where Tim is infused with nitrous oxide until the dentist leaves due to an emergency. He is unable to move when a plastic blowfish from a hanging mobile falls into his mouth, and nearly chokes him to death, but the dentist's receptionist enters the room and removes it before it happens. As Tim and Nora leave, Kimberly and Thomas Burke warn them about pigeons; Tim scares several pigeons near a pavement away for fun, but one of them blinds a construction worker in a crane, who accidentally hits a switch that drops a windowpane above Tim, crushing him.

In Final Destination 5, Tim's death is shown in a montage before the end credits.

== Introduced in Final Destination 3 ==
Final Destination 3 is the third film in the Final Destination series and is set five years after the Route 23 pile-up. It focuses on high school photographer Wendy Christensen, who has a premonition about the derailment of a roller coaster at an amusement park. She convinces nine other people—her sister Julie Christensen, her friend Kevin Fischer, Julie's best friend Perry Malinowski, alumnus Frankie Cheeks, goth couple Ian McKinley and Erin Ulmer, best friends Ashley Freund and Ashlyn Halperin, and athlete Lewis Romero—not to ride the roller coaster just before the derailment occurs.

When Death begins to claim the lives of the survivors in the same order they should have died on the derailment, Wendy realizes the photographs she took that night contain clues about her classmates' deaths and tries to use this knowledge to save them.

=== Amber Regan ===
- Portrayed by Ecstasia Sanders
- Appeared in: Final Destination 3
- Status: Alive

Amber Regan is a sophomore at McKinley High School, who visits the amusement park without permission with her best friends Julie Christensen and Perry Malinowski. Unlike them, she does not board the Devil's Flight roller coaster and is thus spared from its derailment. Later, Amber visits the local tricentennial fair, where she witnesses Perry's death and quickly leaves, horrified.

=== Ashley Freund and Ashlyn Halperin ===
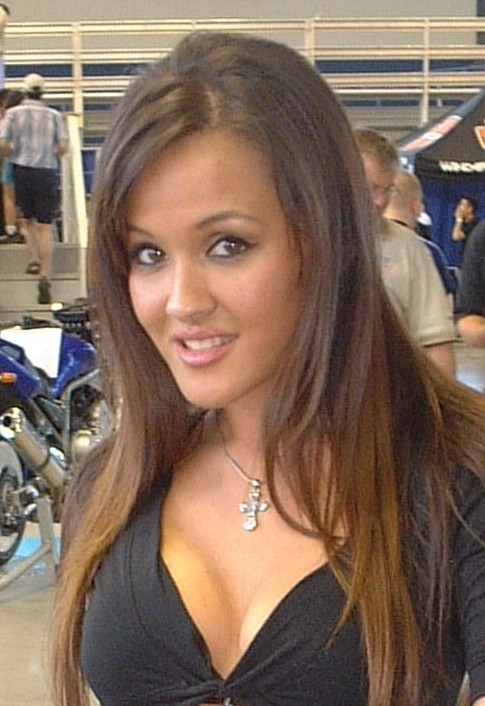
Crystal Lowe portrays Ashlyn Halperin in Final Destination 3.

- Portrayed by: Chelan Simmons and Crystal Lowe
- Appeared in: Final Destination 3 and Final Destination 5 (archive footage)
- Status: Both deceased

Ashley Freund and Ashlyn Halperin are two of the survivors of the Devil's Flight roller coaster crash, and the first and second survivors to die.

Ashley and Ashlyn are two best friends students at McKinley High School, who visit the amusement park for their graduation night, and board the Devil's Flight roller coaster together. Before the ride starts, Wendy Christensen has a premonition about the roller coaster's derailment—in which Ashley and Ashlyn fall to their deaths with classmates Carrie Dreyer and Jason Wise. Wendy panics and when a fight breaks out, they both leave in annoyance as the derailment occurs moments later.

Weeks later, Ashley and Ashlyn visit a tanning salon, where they disregard the business's safety guidelines repeatedly, making them easy targets for Death; the former ignores the manager's warning to throw out her iced beverage, and sets it on a table above the power supply unit; the latter turns up the air conditioner that was cooling the room's tanning beds against a written warning, while Ashley accidentally pulls a shelf loose while browsing through CDs. They both lie in tanning beds until condensation from Ashley's beverage drips onto the power supply unit and malfunctions; the air conditioner causes a coat rack to fall against a plant, which knocks down the shelf. It slides into the openings in the handles of both beds, trapping Ashley and Ashlyn inside. As the temperature rises, they both scream in agony while the beds overheat and burst into flames, burning them both alive.

In an alternate version, Ashlyn gets out from her tanning bed before the shelf traps her; however, it knocks her unconscious while Ashley begins to be burned alive. Ashlyn later wakes up to Ashley's screams and manages to open her tanning bed, but the glass under Ashley shatters and exposes live wires underneath, electrocuting them both.

During the opening credits of The Final Destination, Ashley's and Ashlyn's deaths are shown in X-ray format. In Final Destination 5, Ashley's and Ashlyn's deaths are shown in a montage before the end credits.

=== Carrie Dreyer ===
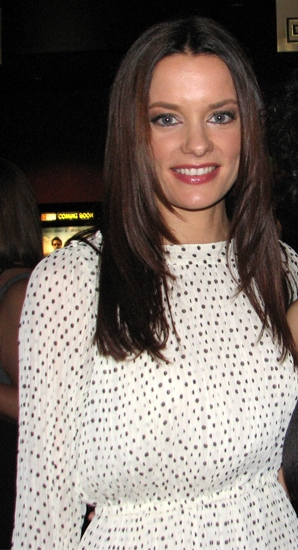
Gina Holden portrays Carrie Dreyer in Final Destination 3.

- Portrayed by Gina Holden
- Appeared in: Final Destination 3
- Status: Deceased

Carrie Dreyer is a student at McKinley High School, and a casualty of the Devil's Flight roller coaster crash.

Carrie is Wendy Christensen's best friend and Kevin Fischer's girlfriend, who visits the amusement park for her graduation night, and boards the Devil's Flight roller coaster with Kevin, Wendy, and Wendy's boyfriend Jason Wise. The group initially had her sit in the back with Wendy, who did not want to see the tracks, but Carrie insists on sitting in the front and switches seats with Kevin.

When Wendy has a premonition about the roller coaster's derailment, she panics and is let off the ride along with several other classmates, while Carrie and Jason stay on the front cars. The remaining passengers begin to shout the operators to start the ride, which suffers a derailment shortly after, and Carrie and Jason fall to their deaths. Kevin is devastated over Carrie's death, and later reveals to Wendy that he planned to propose to her after graduation; ironically, Carrie had earlier disclosed to Wendy that she planned on breaking up with Kevin after graduation.

In an alternate version, Carrie does not board the Devil's Flight roller coaster and is thus spared from its derailment. She breaks up with Kevin the day after the incident, and goes to University of California, Berkeley.

=== Erin Ulmer ===
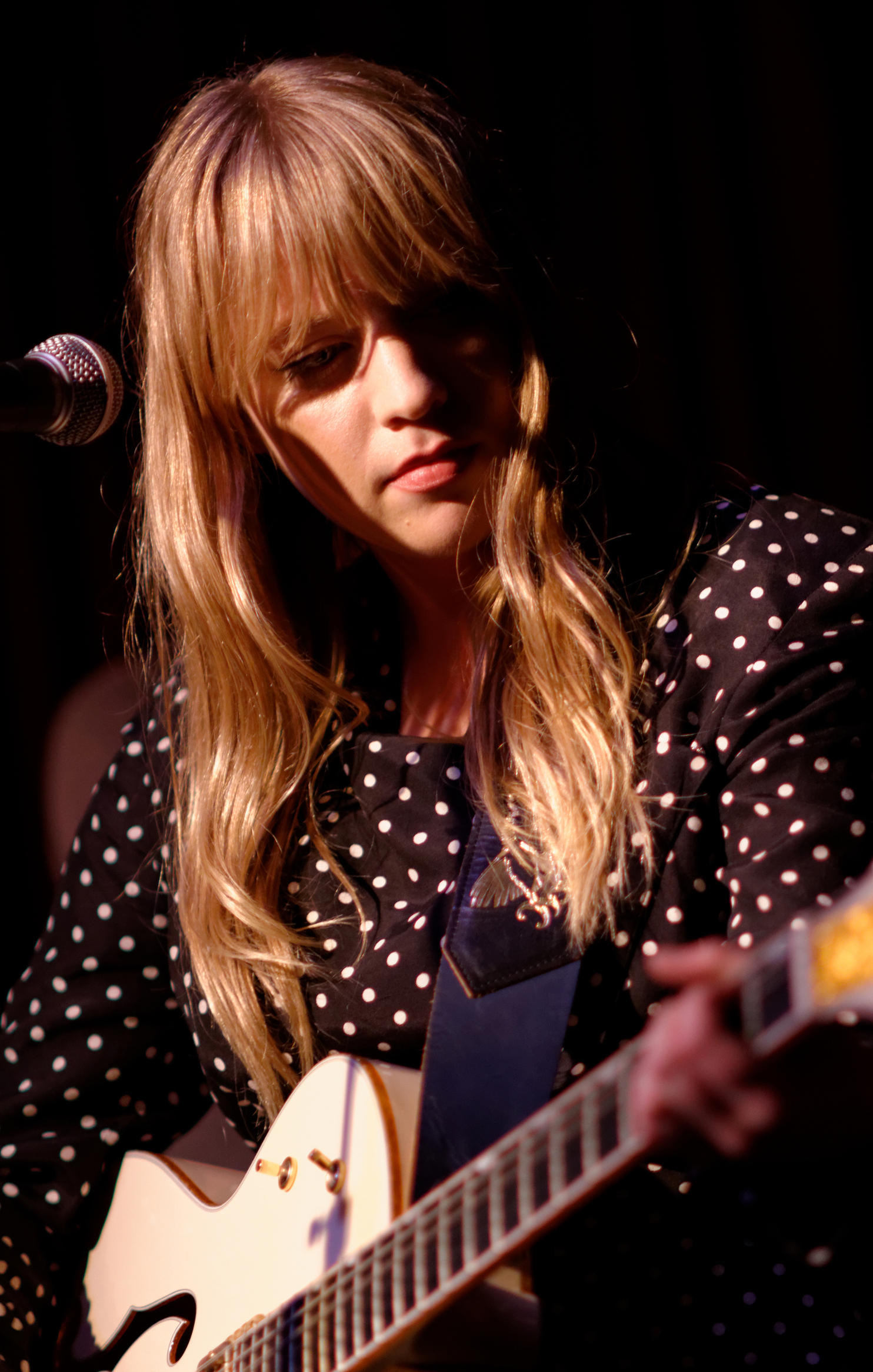
Alexz Johnson portrays Erin Ulmer in Final Destination 3.

- Portrayed by Alexz Johnson
- Appeared in: Final Destination 3 and Final Destination 5 (archive footage)
- Status: Deceased

Erin Ulmer is one of the survivors of the Devil's Flight roller coaster crash, and the fifth survivor to die.

Erin is a goth student at McKinley High School, and Ian McKinley's girlfriend. She visits the amusement park with Ian for their graduation night, and they board the Devil's Flight roller coaster together. Before the ride starts, Wendy Christensen has a premonition about the roller coaster's derailment—in which Erin falls to her death after the cars get stuck on a vertical loop. Wendy panics and a fight breaks out between Kevin Fischer and Lewis Romero. The latter accidentally slaps Erin, and Ian gets involved until they are all thrown off the ride as the derailment occurs moments later.

As the survivors begin to die in bizarre accidents, Wendy and Kevin go to the hardware store where Erin and Ian work to warn them about Death's list, but they remain skeptical. Unbeknownst to them, a forklift punctures a shelf, causing several wood planks to fall above Ian; Wendy manages to save Ian before he is impaled, and Death skips him. Suddenly, a large wooden tile falls onto another plank, which is sent flying through the air and rips a bag of sawdust that blinds Erin. She falls back onto a nail gun that fatally shoots several nails into her head. Erin's death devastates Ian, who blames Wendy for the incident.

During the opening credits of The Final Destination, Erin's death is shown in X-ray format. In Final Destination 5, Erin's death is shown in a montage before the end credits.

=== Frankie Cheeks ===
- Portrayed by Sam Easton
- Appeared in: Final Destination 3 and Final Destination 5 (archive footage)
- Status: Deceased

Franklin "Frankie" Cheeks is one of the survivors of the Devil's Flight roller coaster crash, and the third survivor to die.

Frankie is a pervert alumnus of McKinley High School who, despite having already graduated two years prior, visits the amusement park to harass Ashley Freund and Ashlyn Halperin, and boards the Devil's Flight roller coaster to follow them. Before the ride starts, Wendy Christensen has a premonition about the roller coaster's derailment—in which Frankie falls to his death. She panics and when a fight breaks out, Frankie follows Ashley and Ashlyn off the ride as the derailment occurs moments later.

Weeks later, Wendy and Kevin Fischer stop at a local drive-through, where a truck rams into the side of Kevin's vehicle and traps them. As they attempt to escape, another truck without its driver rolls down a hill towards them. Kevin tries to warn the driver in front, but is ignored and forced to break his own windshield to escape with Wendy. The truck crashes into Kevin's vehicle and discharges a motor fan that hurls towards the driver in front, slicing off the back of his head. It is then revealed that the driver was in fact Frankie.

In an alternate version, Kevin saves Frankie from the motor fan; Frankie reveals that he plans to use the insurance money from both trucks' drivers on prostitutes instead of buying a new car to replace his wrecked one. However, he is arrested days later by an undercover police officer who was disguised as a prostitute to bait sex offenders.

During the opening credits of The Final Destination, Frankie's death is referenced. In Final Destination 5, Frankie's death is shown in a montage before the end credits.

=== Ian McKinley ===
- Portrayed by Kris Lemche
- Appeared in: Final Destination 3 and Final Destination 5 (archive footage)
- Status: Deceased

Ian McKinley is one of the survivors of the Devil's Flight roller coaster crash, and the seventh survivor to die.

Ian is a goth student at McKinley High School, and Erin Ulmer's boyfriend. He visits the amusement park with Erin for their graduation night, and they board the Devil's Flight roller coaster together. Before the ride starts, Wendy Christensen has a premonition about the roller coaster's derailment—in which Ian falls to his death after the cars get stuck on a vertical loop. Wendy panics and a fight breaks out between Kevin Fischer and Lewis Romero. The latter accidentally slaps Erin, and Ian gets involved; they are all thrown off the ride with the derailment occurring moments later.

When the survivors begin to die in bizarre accidents, Wendy and Kevin go to the hardware store where Ian and Erin work to warn them that they are next on Death's list. They remain skeptical until Wendy saves Ian from being impaled by wooden pickets, and Death skips him to kill Erin, the next survivor on the list. Later, a grief-stricken and resentful Ian confronts Wendy at the local tricentennial fair and blames her for Erin's death. After overhearing Wendy state that Death's design includes him in her demise, Ian becomes determined to fulfill his role by not letting Wendy leave to make sure she cannot survive.

A cart of fireworks go off in their direction, missing Kevin, Wendy, Julie, and Ian, but striking a cherry picker behind Ian. Ian shouts that Death cannot kill him, but the cherry picker collapses and bisects him, inadvertently saving Wendy as the cherry picker was supposed to kill her. In an alternate version, the cherry picker collapses right on Ian, crushing him.

During the opening credits of The Final Destination, Ian's death is referenced. In Final Destination 5, Ian's death is shown in a montage before the end credits.

=== Jason Wise ===
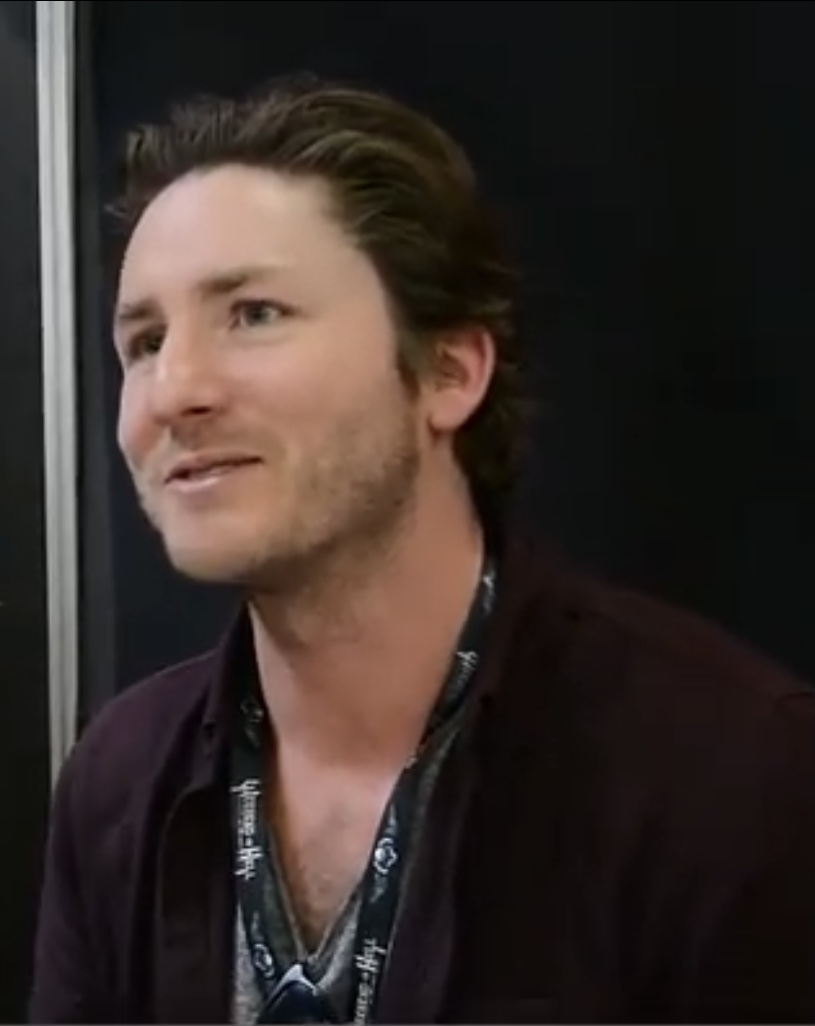
Jess Moss portrays Jason Wise in Final Destination 3.

- Portrayed by Jesse Moss
- Appeared in: Final Destination 3
- Status: Deceased

Jason Robert Wise is a student at McKinley High School, and a casualty of the Devil's Flight roller coaster crash.

Jason is Wendy Christensen's boyfriend and Kevin Fischer's best friend, who visits the amusement park for his graduation night, and boards the Devil's Flight roller coaster with Kevin, Wendy, and Kevin's girlfriend Carrie Dreyer. When Wendy has a premonition about the roller coaster's derailment, she panics and is let off the ride along with several other classmates.

He asks to be let off as well, but is unable to get the operators' attention due to the remaining passengers shouting over them to start the ride. While Wendy is escorted by security guards, she realizes that Jason and Carrie are still on the roller coaster, runs back, and begs the operators to stop the ride, but is taken outside. The roller coaster derails shortly after, and Jason and Carrie fall to their deaths, leaving Wendy devastated. Later on, Wendy realizes that the photographs she took that night foreshadow the survivors' imminent deaths when she sees Jason's photo with the roller coaster in the background.

In an alternate version, Jason does not board the Devil's Flight roller coaster and is thus spared from its derailment.

=== Julie Christensen ===
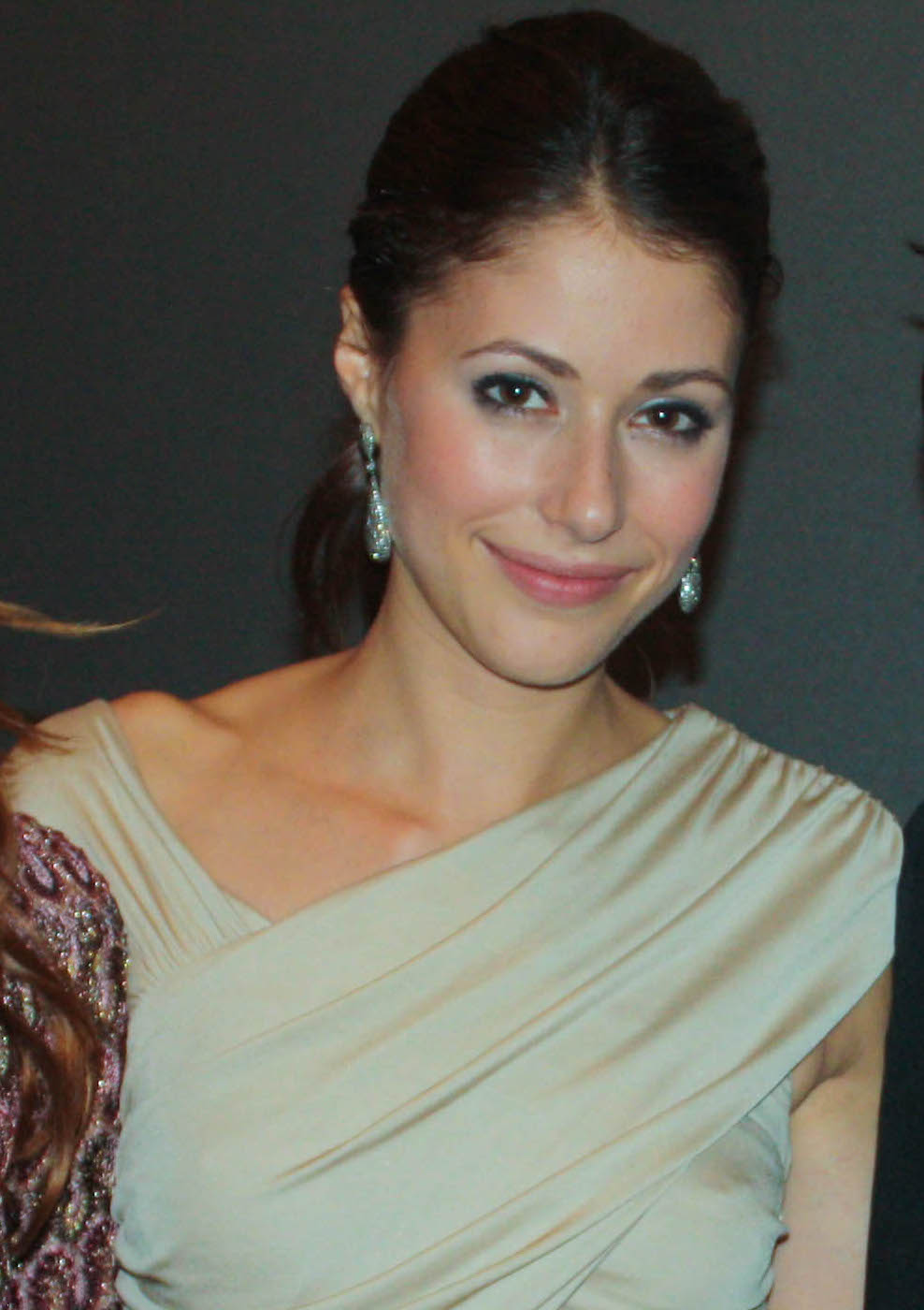
Amanda Crew portrays Julie Christensen in Final Destination 3.

- Portrayed by Amanda Crew
- Appeared in: Final Destination 3 and Final Destination 5 (archive footage)
- Status: Unknown, presumed deceased

Julie Christensen is one of the survivors of the Devil's Flight roller coaster crash, and possibly the eighth survivor to die.

Julie is a sophomore at McKinley High School, and Wendy Christensen's younger sister, who visits the amusement park without permission with her best friends Amber Regan and Perry Malinowski. Unbeknownst to Wendy, she boards the Devil's Flight roller coaster with Perry, and they even sit right in front of her and Kevin Fischer. Before the ride starts, Wendy has a premonition about the roller coaster's derailment—in which Julie and Perry fall to their deaths after the cars get stuck on a vertical loop. Wendy panics and when a fight breaks out, they both leave unnoticed due to all the commotion as the derailment occurs moments later.

When the survivors begin to die in bizarre accidents, Wendy realizes that Julie was also on the roller coaster after she notices a photo of an unidentifiable passenger wearing her bracelet. While Julie is at the local tricentennial fair with Amber and Perry, two pranksters scare a horse tied to a post with firecrackers, causing it to run in panic. The rope tied to the horse wraps around Julie's neck and she is dragged through the fair until Kevin manages to cut the rope before Julie is impaled by a harrow; Death then skips her and kills Perry as she was the next survivor on Death's list.

Five months later, Julie coincidentally encounters Wendy and Kevin on a subway; Wendy has another premonition in which the train derails, and Julie is instantly killed when a stray wheel ejects her out. When the events from the vision begin to occur in reality, they attempt to stop the train as the screen cuts to black and a derailment sound is heard. Julie's ultimate fate remains ambiguous and has been subject of discussion for years.

During the opening credits of The Final Destination, the Train 081 crash premonition involving Julie's possible death is referenced. In Final Destination 5, Julie's premonition death is shown in a montage before the end credits.

=== Kevin Fischer ===
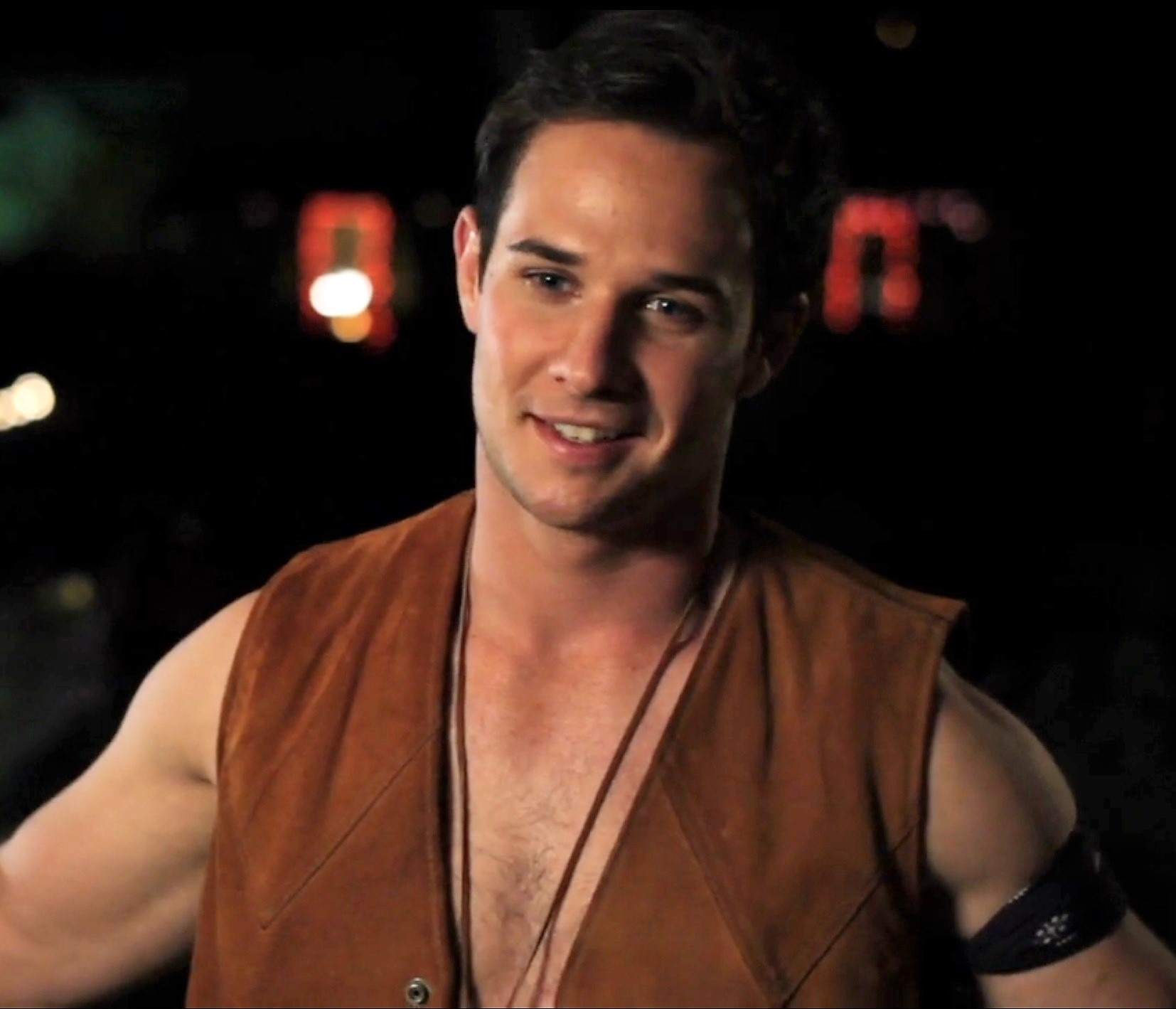
Ryan Merriman portrays Kevin Fischer in Final Destination 3.

- Portrayed by Ryan Merriman
- Appeared in: Final Destination 3 and Final Destination 5 (archive footage)
- Status: Unknown, presumed deceased

Kevin Fischer is one of the survivors of the Devil's Flight roller coaster crash, and possibly the ninth survivor to die.

Kevin is a student at McKinley High School, and Carrie Dreyer's boyfriend, who visits the amusement park for his graduation night, and boards the Devil's Flight roller coaster with Carrie, his best friend Jason Wise, and Jason's girlfriend Wendy Christensen. Before the ride starts, Wendy has a premonition about the roller coaster's derailment—in which Kevin is bisected by a metal pipe. When she panics, Kevin ends up getting into a fight with Lewis Romero until they are all thrown off the ride with several other classmates, while Carrie and Jason stay on the front cars as the derailment occurs moments later.

Despite his grief over Carrie's death, Kevin is fascinated by Wendy's experience, which leads him to learn about the Flight 180 explosion and the subsequent deaths of its survivors. He warns Wendy that Death is still after them, and she initially dismisses his theory; but when the survivors begin to die in bizarre accidents, they work together to save the remaining ones. Kevin is nearly killed at the local tricentennial fair when a malfunctioning barbecue grill explodes in his face, but Wendy pulls him back, and Death skips him.

Five months later, Kevin coincidentally encounters Wendy and Julie Christensen on a subway; Wendy has another premonition in which the train derails, and Kevin is crushed between the train and the tunnel wall. When the events from the vision begin to occur in reality, he attempts to use the train's emergency brake as the screen cuts to black and a derailment sound is heard. Kevin's ultimate fate remains ambiguous and has been subject of discussion for years.

In the alternate version, Kevin does not board the Devil's Flight roller coaster, he later has a restraining order from Wendy after he gets obsessed with her, he was sent to the Iraq for army and later discharged, in the present day Kevin has been back to McKinley staying one hundred yards away from Christenen's home.

During the opening credits of The Final Destination, the Train 081 crash involving his possible death is referenced. In Final Destination 5, Kevin's premonition death is shown in a montage before the end credits.

=== Lewis Romero ===
- Portrayed by Texas Battle
- Appeared in: Final Destination 3 and Final Destination 5 (archive footage)
- Status: Deceased

Lewis Romero is one of the survivors of the Devil's Flight roller coaster crash, and the fourth survivor to die.

Lewis is a student at McKinley High School, and an arrogant, but competitive athlete, who visits the amusement park for his graduation night, and boards the Devil's Flight roller coaster. Before the ride starts, Wendy Christensen has a premonition about the roller coaster's derailment—in which Lewis's spine is snapped in the tracks when he falls out of his seat. When Wendy panics, Lewis mocks her, believing that she is making a joke to get attention. He gets involved in a fight with Kevin Fischer and they are all thrown off the ride as the derailment occurs moments later.

When the survivors begin to die in bizarre accidents, Wendy and Kevin visit Lewis at the school's gym to warn him that he is next on Death's list, but Lewis rudely disregards their warning. Meanwhile, a weightlifter knocks out a bear statue's claw, which hits another weightlifter and causes him to drop his weights. They knock down two displayed swords that swing down and cut the wires to a Bowflex machine's weights Lewis is working out; when he lifts the machine one more time, the weights fall and crush his head.

In an alternate version, Lewis's death occurs much earlier as soon as Wendy and Kevin enter the gym.

During the opening credits of The Final Destination, Lewis' death in Wendy's premonition is shown in X-ray format. In Final Destination 5, Lewis's death in Wendy's premonition is shown in a montage before the end credits.

=== Perry Malinowski ===
- Portrayed by Maggie Ma
- Appeared in: Final Destination 3 and Final Destination 5 (archive footage)
- Status: Deceased

Perry Malinowski is one of the survivors of the Devil's Flight roller coaster crash, and the sixth survivor to die.

Perry is a sophomore at McKinley High School, who visits the amusement park without permission with her best friends Julie Christensen and Amber Regan. Unbeknownst to Julie's older sister Wendy Christensen, Perry boards the Devil's Flight roller coaster with Julie. Before the ride starts, Wendy has a premonition about the roller coaster's derailment—in which Perry and Julie fall to their deaths after the cars get stuck on a vertical loop. Wendy panics and when a fight breaks out, they both leave unnoticed due to all the commotion as the derailment occurs moments later.

Weeks later, Wendy realizes that her sister was also in the roller coaster and rushes to the local tricentennial fair to save her. Wendy arrives just as a frightened horse drags Julie through the fair, but Kevin Fischer saves her before she is impaled by a harrow. The fair's security guards settle the horse down and tie it to a flagpole while Perry and Amber arrive to console Julie. When Wendy begs Julie to tell her who was the person sitting next to her on the ride, Perry realizes that she is the next on Death's list; Perry stands up as the horse loses control and breaks the flagpole, which fatally impales her through the chest.

During the opening credits of The Final Destination, Perry's death is shown in X-ray format. In Final Destination 5, Perry's death is shown in a montage before the end credits.

=== Wendy Christensen ===
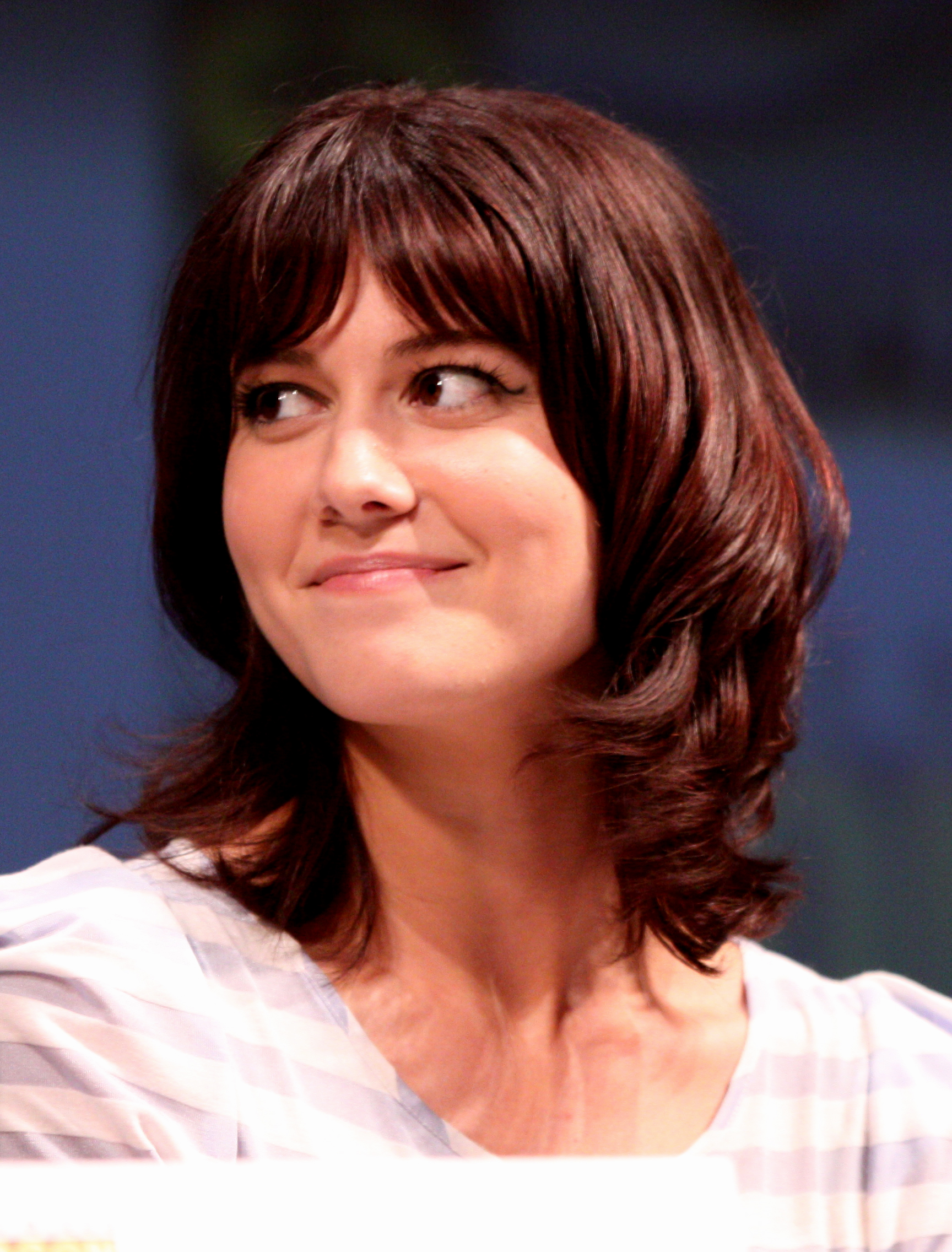
Mary Elizabeth Winstead portrays Wendy Christensen in Final Destination 3.

- Portrayed by Mary Elizabeth Winstead
- Appeared in: Final Destination 3 and Final Destination 5 (archive footage)
- Status: Unknown, presumed deceased

Wendy Christensen is the protagonist and visionary of Final Destination 3. She is one of the survivors of the Devil's Flight roller coaster crash, and possibly the tenth and final survivor to die.

Wendy is a photographer and student at McKinley High School, who visits the amusement park for her graduation night, and boards the Devil's Flight roller coaster with her boyfriend Jason Wise, her best friend Carrie Dreyer, and Carrie's boyfriend Kevin Fischer. She is considered a control freak among her classmates, and has anxiety, which is evident when they board the ride.

Before the ride starts, Wendy has a premonition about the roller coaster's derailment that will kill everyone on board. She panics and is escorted off the ride, along with nine other people, witnessing as the derailment occurs moments later; Jason and Carrie are among the casualties, leaving Wendy devastated. Several weeks later, she learns about what happened to the Flight 180 explosion and the Route 23 pile-up survivors—realizing that Death is still after the survivors—and sets out with Kevin to save them using the photographs she took that night, which provide clues about the survivors' imminent deaths.

Wendy's attempts to save the survivors are futile, with the exception of her younger sister Julie Christensen, Ian McKinley, and Kevin himself. Ian blames Wendy for his girlfriend Erin Ulmer's death, and confronts her at the local tricentennial fair, where Death skips Wendy after Ian unknowingly saves her by stepping in the place she was supposed to be and he is crushed by a nearby cherry picker. It leads Wendy to believe that since the trio have all been skipped they have now cheated Death.

Five months later, Wendy coincidentally encounters Julie and Kevin on a subway; she has another premonition in which the train derails, and she survives only to be fatally run over by another train. When the events from the vision begin to occur in reality, they attempt to stop the train as the screen cuts to black and a derailment sound is heard. Wendy's ultimate fate remains ambiguous and has been subject of discussion for years.

In the alternate version, Wendy does not board the Devil's Flight roller coaster, she now changed her name to Ming after she denies her gift and was last seen in Vancouver, Canada.

During the opening credits of The Final Destination, the Train 081 crash involving her possible death is referenced. In Final Destination 5, Wendy appears in archive footage in the final credits.

== Introduced in The Final Destination ==
The Final Destination is the fourth film in the Final Destination series and is set three years after the Devil's Flight roller coaster's derailment. It focuses on college student Nick O'Bannon, who has a premonition about a massive crash during a stock car race. He convinces nine other spectators—his girlfriend Lori Milligan, his best friend Hunt Wynorski, Hunt's ex-girlfriend Janet Cunningham, security guard George Lanter, racist tow truck driver Carter Daniels, cowboy Jonathan Groves, mother Samantha Lane, mechanic Andy Kewzer, and Andy's girlfriend Nadia Monroy—to leave the speedway just before the crash occurs.

As Death begins to claim the lives of the survivors in the same order they should have died on the crash, Nick, Lori, and George must find a way to cheat Death and save the remaining survivors before it is too late.

=== Andy Kewzer ===
- Portrayed by Andrew Fiscella
- Appeared in: The Final Destination and Final Destination 5 (archive footage)
- Status: Deceased

Andy Kewzer is one of the survivors of the McKinley Speedway crash, and the fourth survivor to die.

Andy is a local mechanic who visits the McKinley Speedway with his girlfriend Nadia Monroy. Meanwhile, Nick O'Bannon has a premonition about a massive crash—in which Andy rushes to the exit after a flying wheel kills Nadia, but trips and falls on a sharp plank that impales his head through his mouth. When Nick panics, he accidentally bumps into Andy, who angrily follows him out of the stadium with Nadia. As the crash occurs moments later, a stray wheel suddenly decapitates Nadia, leaving Andy devastated.

When the survivors begin to die in bizarre accidents, Nick, Lori Milligan, and George Lanter visit Andy at his mechanic workshop to warn him that he is next on Death's list, but he does not believes them. After a truck nearly crushes him into a cross-hatched fence, a CO_{2} tank explodes and knocks Andy into the fence, which slices him into pieces.

In Final Destination 5, Andy's death in Nick's premonition is shown in a montage before the end credits.

=== Carter Daniels ===
- Portrayed by Justin Welborn
- Appeared in: The Final Destination and Final Destination 5 (archive footage)
- Status: Deceased

Carter Daniels is one of the survivors of the McKinley Speedway crash, and the second survivor to die.

Carter is a racist white Southern neo-fascist tow truck driver who visits the McKinley Speedway with his wife Cynthia Daniels, who is as intolerant as her husband. Based on actions, it is cleared that Carter is adhered to the ideologies of neo-Confederacy and neo-Nazism. Meanwhile, Nick O'Bannon has a premonition about a massive crash—in which both Carter and Cynthia are bisected by flying debris. When Nick panics, he accidentally spills Carter's beer, who angrily follows him out of the stadium and orders Cynthia to stay behind. As the crash occurs moments later, George Lanter refuses to let him go back to rescue his wife—who dies in the incident—and they all witness Nadia Monroy's sudden death.

Devastated, Carter blames George for Cynthia's death, in addition to already hating him for being African-American. Several days later, Carter attempts to set a giant cross on fire on George's front lawn until a horseshoe hanging from his tow truck's rear-view mirror falls onto the gear shift. The truck begins to roll away—ironically while its radio plays anti-discrimination song "Why Can't We Be Friends?" by interracial band War—and Carter tries to stop it, but a loose towing cable wraps around his ankle and drags him down the street.

Gas spills out of the truck and the cable sparks, lighting Carter on fire, before the truck finally explodes. George leaves his house only to witness as Carter is blown to pieces, and his severed head lands on the lawn.

In Final Destination 5, Carter's death in Nick's premonition is shown in a montage before the end credits.

=== Cynthia Daniels ===
- Portrayed by Lara Grice
- Appeared in: The Final Destination and Final Destination 5 (archive footage)
- Status: Deceased

Cynthia Daniels is the wife of Carter Daniels and a casualty of the McKinley Speedway crash.

Cynthia visits the McKinley Speedway with Carter; much like him, she is a racist herself as she disregards George Lanter. Meanwhile, Nick O'Bannon has a premonition about a massive crash—in which both Cynthia and Carter are bisected by flying debris. When Nick panics, he accidentally spills Carter's beer, who angrily follows him out of the stadium and orders Cynthia to stay behind. As the crash occurs moments later, George refuses to let Carter go back to rescue her, and Cynthia is killed. Her death devastates Carter, who resents George and blames him for the incident.

In Final Destination 5, Cynthia's death in Nick's premonition is shown in a montage before the end credits.

=== George Lanter ===
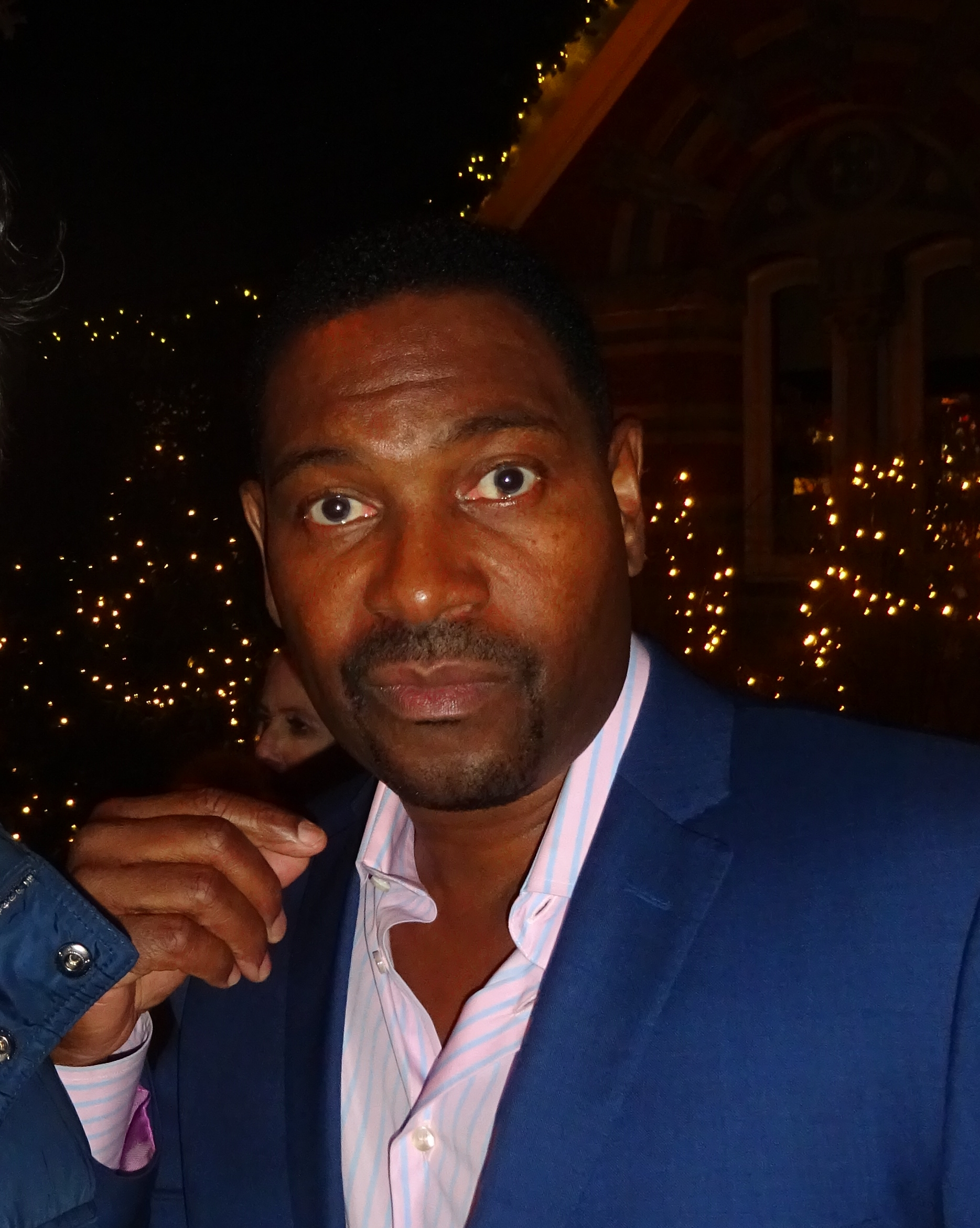
Mykelti Williamson portrays George Lanter in The Final Destination.

- Portrayed by Mykelti Williamson
- Appeared in: The Final Destination and Final Destination 5 (archive footage)
- Status: Deceased

George Lanter is one of the survivors of the McKinley Speedway crash, and the seventh survivor to die.

George is a security guard who works at the McKinley Speedway. He is also a recovering alcoholic who grieves over the deaths of his wife and daughter in a traffic collision where he was driving under alcohol influence. Meanwhile, Nick O'Bannon has a premonition about a massive crash—in which George is incinerated by an exploding motor engine. When Nick panics, George escorts him out of the stadium. As the crash occurs moments later, he refuses to let Carter Daniels back to rescue his wife Cynthia—who dies in the incident—and they all witness Nadia Monroy's sudden death.

After Carter's and Samantha Lane's deaths, he believes Nick and Lori Milligan that Death is still after them, and tries to help them to save the remaining survivors. When he and Lori save Janet Cunningham at a malfunctioning car wash, George realizes that he is next on Death's list and attempts to commit suicide, but his multiple failed attempts lead the trio to believe that saving Janet has ruined Death's plan. However, Nick later learns that Jonathan Groves was actually next, and both Nick and George rush to the hospital to save him, but they arrive too late. As they leave, George is fatally run over by a speeding ambulance.

In Final Destination 5, George's death is shown in a montage before the end credits.

=== Hunt Wynorski ===
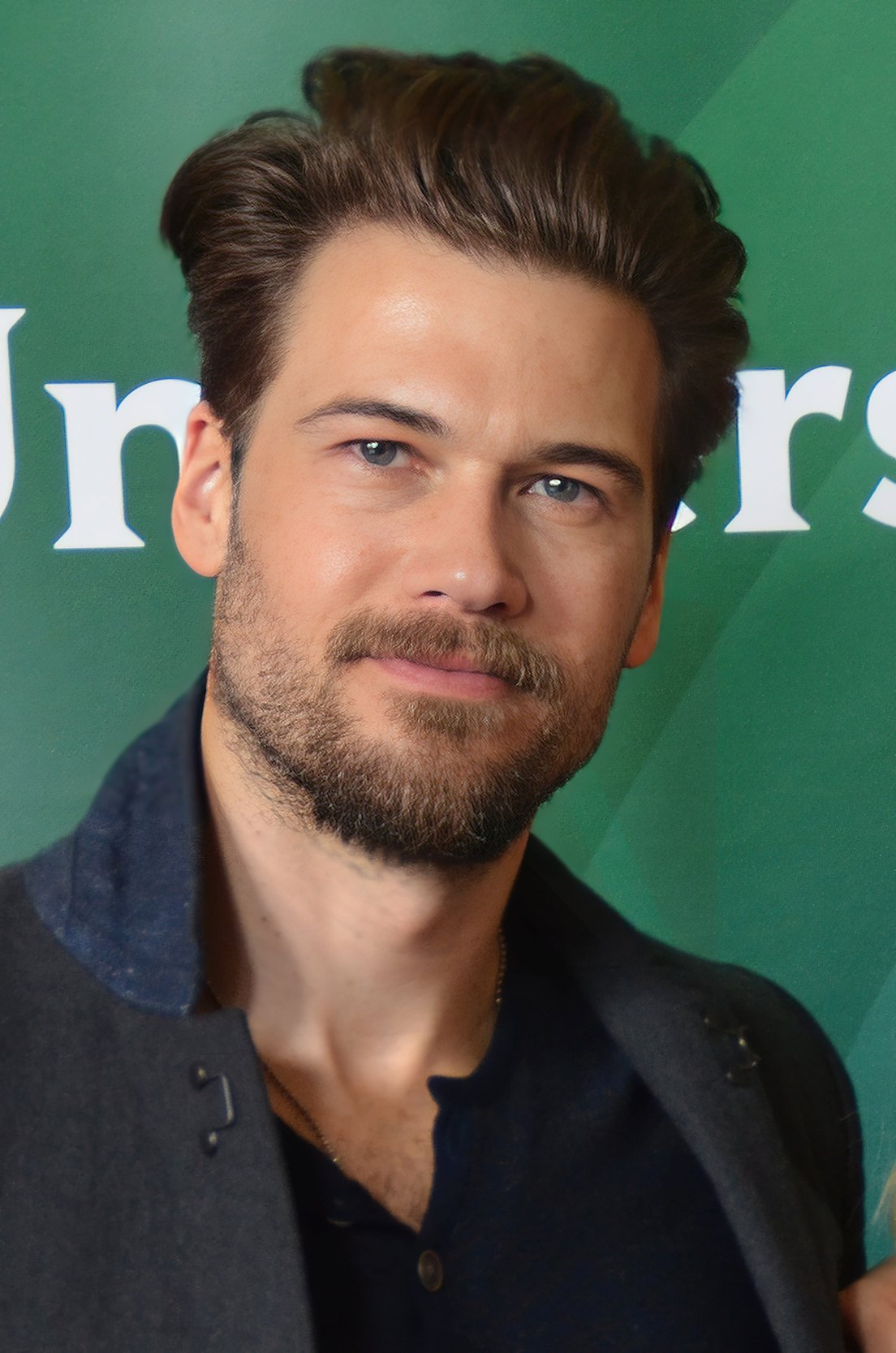
Nick Zano portrays Hunt Wynorski in The Final Destination.

- Portrayed by Nick Zano
- Appeared in: The Final Destination and Final Destination 5 (archive footage)
- Status: Deceased

Hunt Wynorski is one of the survivors of the McKinley Speedway crash, and the fifth survivor to die.

Hunt is a college student who visits the McKinley Speedway with his ex-girlfriend Janet Cunningham, his best friend Nick O'Bannon, and Nick's girlfriend Lori Milligan for a study break. Meanwhile, Nick has a premonition about a massive crash—in which both Hunt and Janet are crushed to death by concrete stands when the stadium collapses. When Nick panics, Hunt follows him out of the stadium. As the crash occurs moments later, they all witness Nadia Monroy's sudden death.

Several days later, Nick experiences another vision that involves water and tries to warn Hunt to avoid it. Hunt visits a country club swimming pool, where a child sprays him with a water gun and damages his cell phone. He confiscates the gun and places it on the pool's control box, but the gun falls and hits a lever that triggers the pool's draining system. Shortly after, Hunt is struck by a golf ball and drops his lucky coin into the pool, where it is sucked into the drain. Hunt dives in to retrieve the coin, only to be trapped by the suction. The increasing pressure results in Hunt's organs being violently extracted through his anus and ejected from a pump, along with his coin.

In Final Destination 5, Hunt's death is shown in a montage before the end credits.

=== Janet Cunningham ===
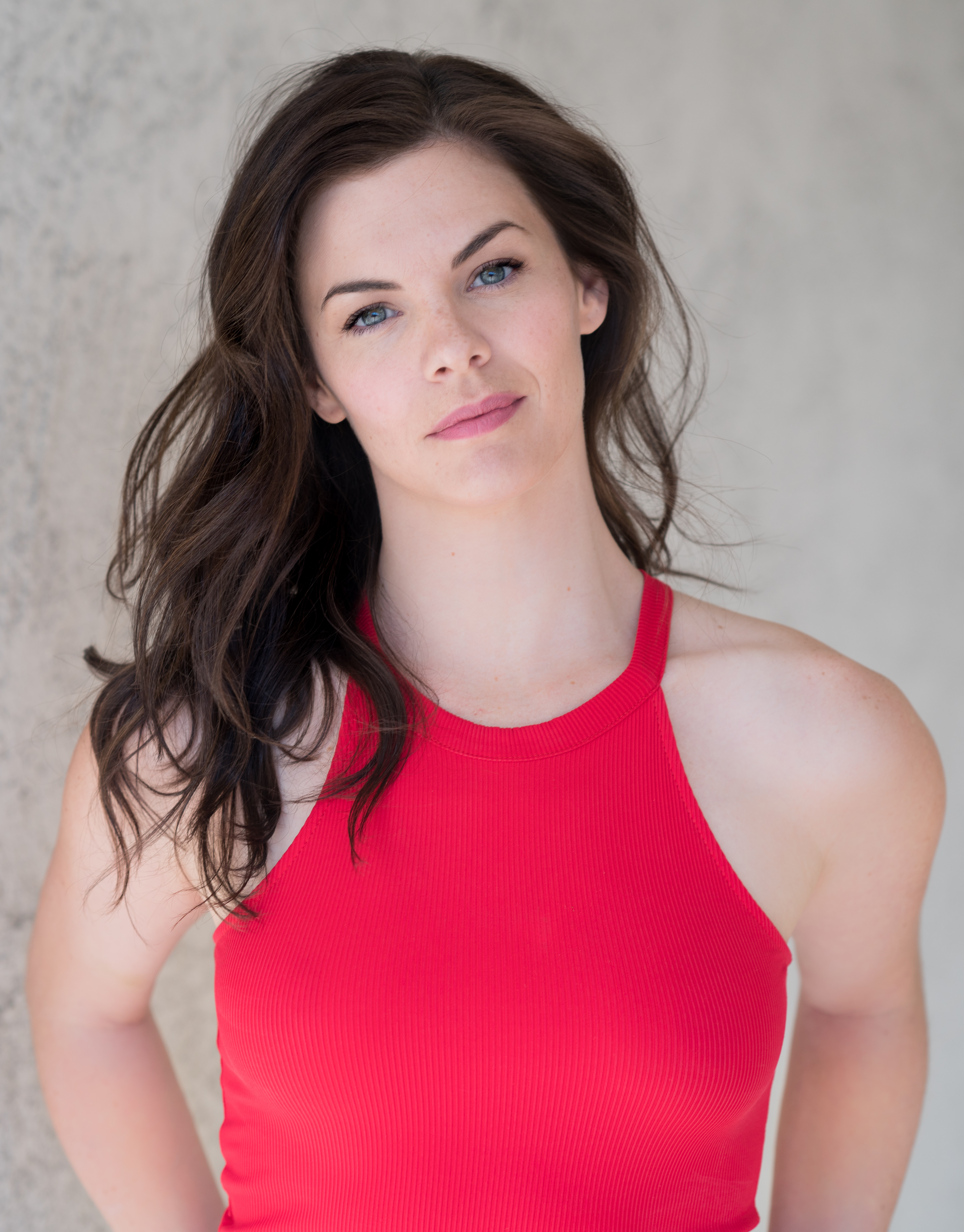
Haley Webb portrays Janet Cunningham in The Final Destination.

- Portrayed by Haley Webb
- Appeared in: The Final Destination and Final Destination 5 (archive footage)
- Status: Deceased

Janet Cunningham is one of the survivors of the McKinley Speedway crash, and the eighth survivor to die.

Janet is a college student who visits the McKinley Speedway with her ex-boyfriend Hunt Wynorski, her best friend Lori Milligan, and Lori's boyfriend Nick O'Bannon for a study break instead of going to the cinema like she wanted. Meanwhile, Nick has a premonition about a massive crash—in which both Janet and Hunt are crushed to death by concrete stands when the stadium collapses. When Nick panics, Janet follows him out of the stadium. As the crash occurs moments later, they all witness Nadia Monroy's sudden death.

When the survivors begin to die in bizarre accidents, she refuses to believe that Death is still after her. Janet later is nearly killed at a malfunctioning car wash, but is saved by Lori and George Lanter, which leads them to believe that they have cheated Death. When she and Lori visit a mall cinema, Nick has another premonition about the mall's disastrous explosion—in which Janet is fatally stabbed by flying shrapnel—and rushes to stop the explosion before it occurs, leading them to believe that they have cheated Death again.

Two weeks later, while at a café with Janet and Lori, Nick realizes that the mall's vision was only a feint meant to lead them to where they really needed to be for Death to kill them once and for all. As Nick relays the information, a truck crashes into the café and kills all three of them; Janet's death is seen in X-ray format as her spine is crushed under the wheels.

In Final Destination 5, Janet's death in Nick's mall premonition is shown in a montage before the end credits.

=== Jonathan Groves ===
- Portrayed by Jackson Walker
- Appeared in: The Final Destination
- Status: Deceased

Jonathan Groves is one of the survivors of the McKinley Speedway crash, and the sixth survivor to die.

Jonathan is a modern cowboy who visits the McKinley Speedway. Meanwhile, Nick O'Bannon has a premonition about a massive crash—in which Nick asks him to move so his girlfriend Lori Milligan can see the race just before the crash occurs; Jonathan is killed when a burning car flies into the stands and crushes him. Nick does not remember Jonathan because he never left the stadium with the other survivors, but later he sees on a news report that the heavily injured Jonathan survived and is at the hospital.

Because Nick left the stadium before asking him to move, like he did in the vision, he inadvertently saved Jonathan's life, thus putting him on Death's list. Nick and George Lanter rush to the hospital to save him, but they arrive only to witness as Jonathan is crushed by an overflowing bathtub that falls through the floor above him.

=== Lori Milligan ===
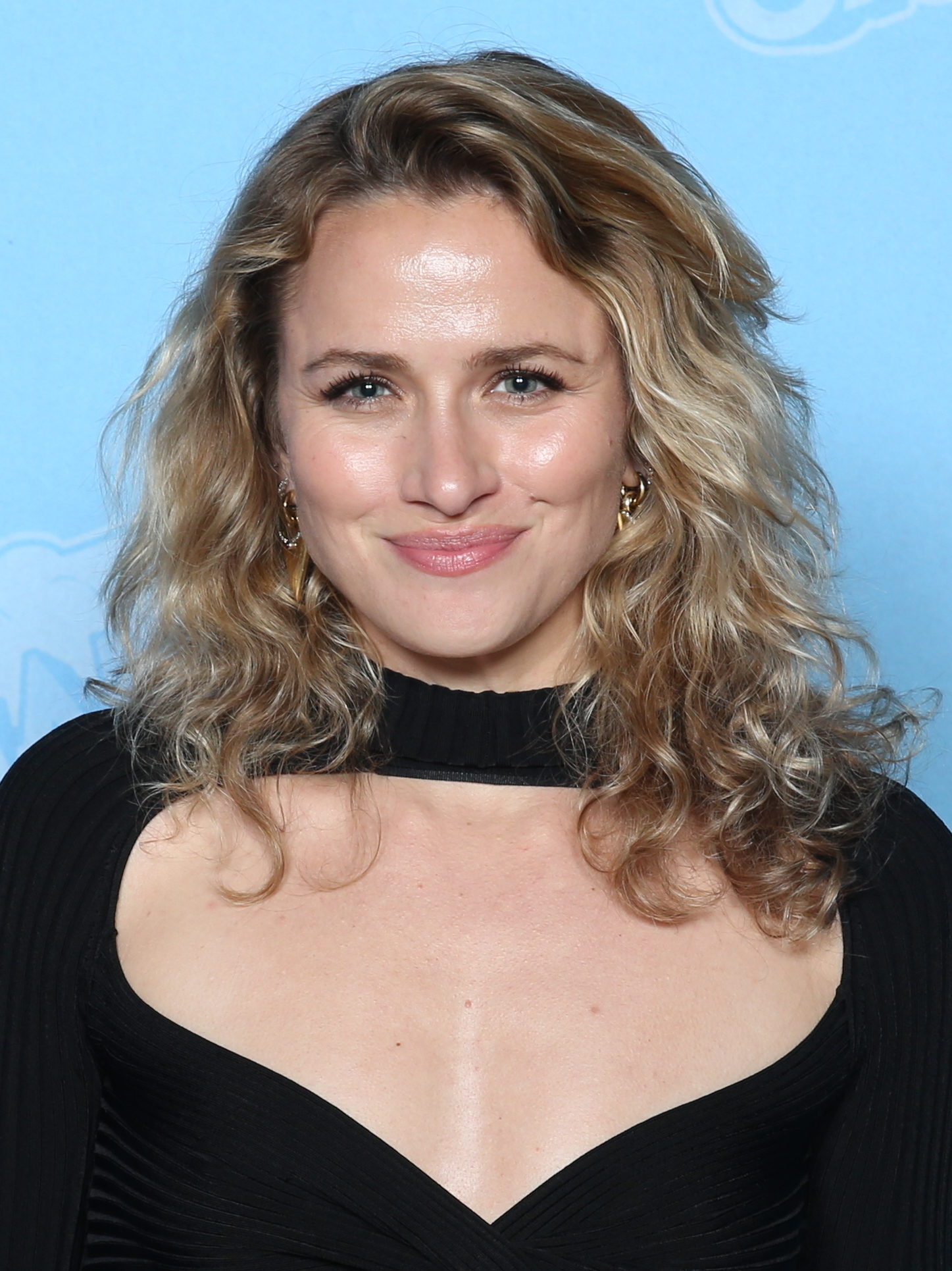
Shantel VanSanten portrays Lori Milligan in The Final Destination.

- Portrayed by Shantel VanSanten
- Appeared in: The Final Destination and Final Destination 5 (archive footage)
- Status: Deceased

Lori Milligan is one of the survivors of the McKinley Speedway crash, and the ninth survivor to die.

Lori is a college student who visits the McKinley Speedway with her boyfriend Nick O'Bannon, her best friend Janet Cunningham, and Janet's ex-boyfriend Hunt Wynorski for a study break. Meanwhile, Nick has a premonition about a massive crash—in which Lori is incinerated by an exploding motor engine. When Nick panics, Lori follows him out of the stadium. As the crash occurs moments later, they all witness Nadia Monroy's sudden death.

When the survivors begin to die in bizarre accidents, Lori, Nick, and George Lanter attempt to save the remaining survivors. She and George manage to save Janet at a malfunctioning car wash, which lead the trio to believe that saving Janet has ruined Death's plan. As she and Janet visit a mall cinema, Lori sees omens and suspects they are still in danger, while Nick has another premonition about the mall's disastrous explosion—in which Lori is fatally crushed by an open escalator engine—and rushes to stop the explosion before it occurs, leading them to believe that they have cheated Death again.

Two weeks later, while at a café with Lori and Janet, Nick realizes that the mall's vision was only a feint meant to lead them to where they really needed to be for Death to kill them once and for all. As Nick relays the information, a truck crashes into the café and kills all three of them; Lori's death is seen in X-ray format as she is decapitated after the impact snaps her neck.

In Final Destination 5, Lori's death in Nick's mall premonition is shown in a montage before the end credits.

=== Nadia Monroy ===
- Portrayed by Stephanie Honoré
- Appeared in: The Final Destination and Final Destination 5 (archive footage)
- Status: Deceased

Nadia Monroy is one of the survivors of the McKinley Speedway crash, and the first survivor to die.

Nadia visits the McKinley Speedway with her boyfriend Andy Kewzer. Meanwhile, Nick O'Bannon has a premonition about a massive crash—in which a wheel flies into the stands and decapitates Nadia. When Nick panics, he accidentally bumps into Andy, who angrily follows him out of the stadium with Nadia. As the crash occurs moments later, she berates the survivors for their actions until a flying wheel suddenly decapitates her, similar to her death in Nick's premonition.

In Final Destination 5, Nadia's death is shown in a montage before the end credits.

=== Nick O'Bannon ===
- Portrayed by Bobby Campo
- Appeared in: The Final Destination and Final Destination 5 (archive footage)
- Status: Deceased

Nick O'Bannon is the protagonist and visionary of The Final Destination. He is one of the survivors of the McKinley Speedway crash, and the tenth and final survivor to die.

Nick is a college student who visits the McKinley Speedway with his girlfriend Lori Milligan, his best friend Hunt Wynorski, and Hunt's ex-girlfriend Janet Cunningham for a study break. While watching the race, Nick has a premonition about a massive crash that will send debris into the stands—causing the entire stadium to collapse—and impale him into a metal pipe. He panics and a fight breaks out between him and several other spectators, who follow him out of the stadium as the crash occurs moments later.

Several days later, the survivors begin to die one by one in a series of bizarre accidents that are foreshadowed in visions Nick suffers, so he, Lori, and George Lanter attempt to save the remaining ones. Although Hunt and George meet their demises, Nick, Lori, and Janet believe they have finally cheated Death. However, Nick has a premonition of a disastrous mall explosion that would have killed Lori and Janet, but he manages to stop it before it occurs, leading the trio to believe they have cheated Death again.

Two weeks later, while at a café with Lori and Janet, Nick realizes that the mall's vision was only a feint meant to lead them to where they really needed to be for Death to kill them once and for all. As Nick relays the information, a truck crashes into the café and kills all three of them; Nick's death is seen in X-ray format as he is thrown into a wall and the impact dislocates his jaw.

In the alternate version, Nick held by the fire extinguisher which sacrifices himself at the police car which incinerates him.

In Final Destination 5, Nick's death in his premonition is shown in a montage before the end credits.

=== Samantha Lane ===
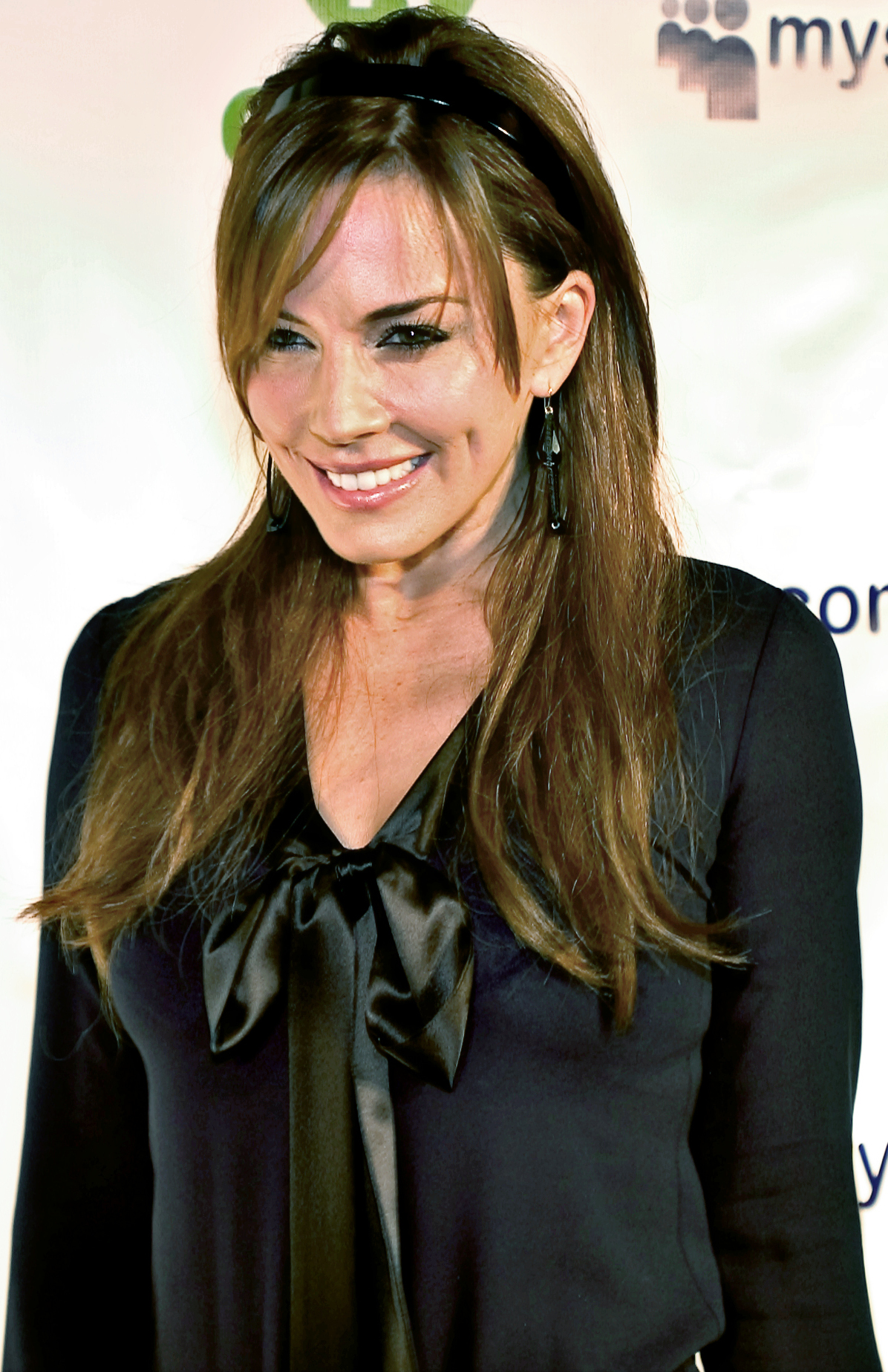
Krista Allen portrays Samantha Lane in The Final Destination.

- Portrayed by Krista Allen
- Appeared in: The Final Destination and Final Destination 5 (archive footage)
- Status: Deceased

Samantha Lane is one of the survivors of the McKinley Speedway crash, and the third survivor to die.

Samantha visits the McKinley Speedway with her husband and their sons. Meanwhile, Nick O'Bannon has a premonition about a massive crash—in which Samantha is trampled by fleeing spectators, before she is crushed by a motor engine that flies into the stands. When Nick panics, Samantha and her husband follow their sons out of the stadium as the crash occurs moments later. The following night, she thanks Nick for saving her life during a candlelight vigil held at the stadium.

Several days later, Samantha visits a beauty salon with her sons, who start throwing rocks at a stop sign, unaware that one of them landed in the grass near a man riding a lawn mower. When she leaves the salon, the lawn mower runs right over the rock, which is shot through Samantha's eye, instantly killing her as her sons and the salon's staff scream in horror.

In Final Destination 5, Samantha's death is shown in a montage before the end credits.

== Introduced in Final Destination 5 ==
The North Bay Bridge survivors (from left to right): Candice Hooper (Ellen Wroe), Peter Friedkin (Miles Fisher), Nathan Sears (Arlen Escarpeta), Sam Lawton (Nicholas D'Agosto), Isaac Palmer (P. J. Byrne), Molly Harper (Emma Bell), and Olivia Castle (Jacqueline MacInnes Wood). Survivor Dennis Lapman (David Koechner) is absent from the scene.

Final Destination 5 is the fifth film in the Final Destination series and is set less than a month before the Flight 180 explosion, serving as a prequel to the original film. It focuses on office employee Sam Lawton, who has a premonition about a fatal suspension bridge collapse. He leaves the bridge along with seven other people—his ex-girlfriend Molly Harper, his friends Nathan Sears and Peter Friedkin, Peter's girlfriend Candice Hooper, co-workers Isaac Palmer and Olivia Castle, and their boss Dennis Lapman—just before the collapse occurs.

When Death begins to claim the lives of the survivors in the same order they should have died on the collapse, Sam and Molly must find a way to cheat Death and save the remaining survivors while dealing with their own personal problems.

=== Candice Hooper ===
- Portrayed by Ellen Wroe
- Appeared in: Final Destination 5
- Status: Deceased

Candice Hooper is one of the survivors of the North Bay Bridge collapse, and the first survivor to die.

Candice is an intern at Presage Paper and Peter Friedkin's girlfriend; she is also a college student and varsity gymnast, who is on her way to a company retreat with her co-workers. Sam Lawton has a premonition about the collapse of the suspension bridge their bus is crossing—in which Candice falls off the bridge and is impaled by a sail boat mast. When Sam warns everyone, a confused Candice follows him out of the bus just as the bridge collapses moments later.

Several days later, Candice attends a gymnastics training with Peter; another gymnast steps on an upright screw that fell onto the balance beams and falls off, knocking a bowl of powder into a fan. The dust blinds Candice as she falls off the uneven bars and her body folds in half backwards, fatally snapping her spine in front of a horrified Peter.

=== Dennis Lapman ===
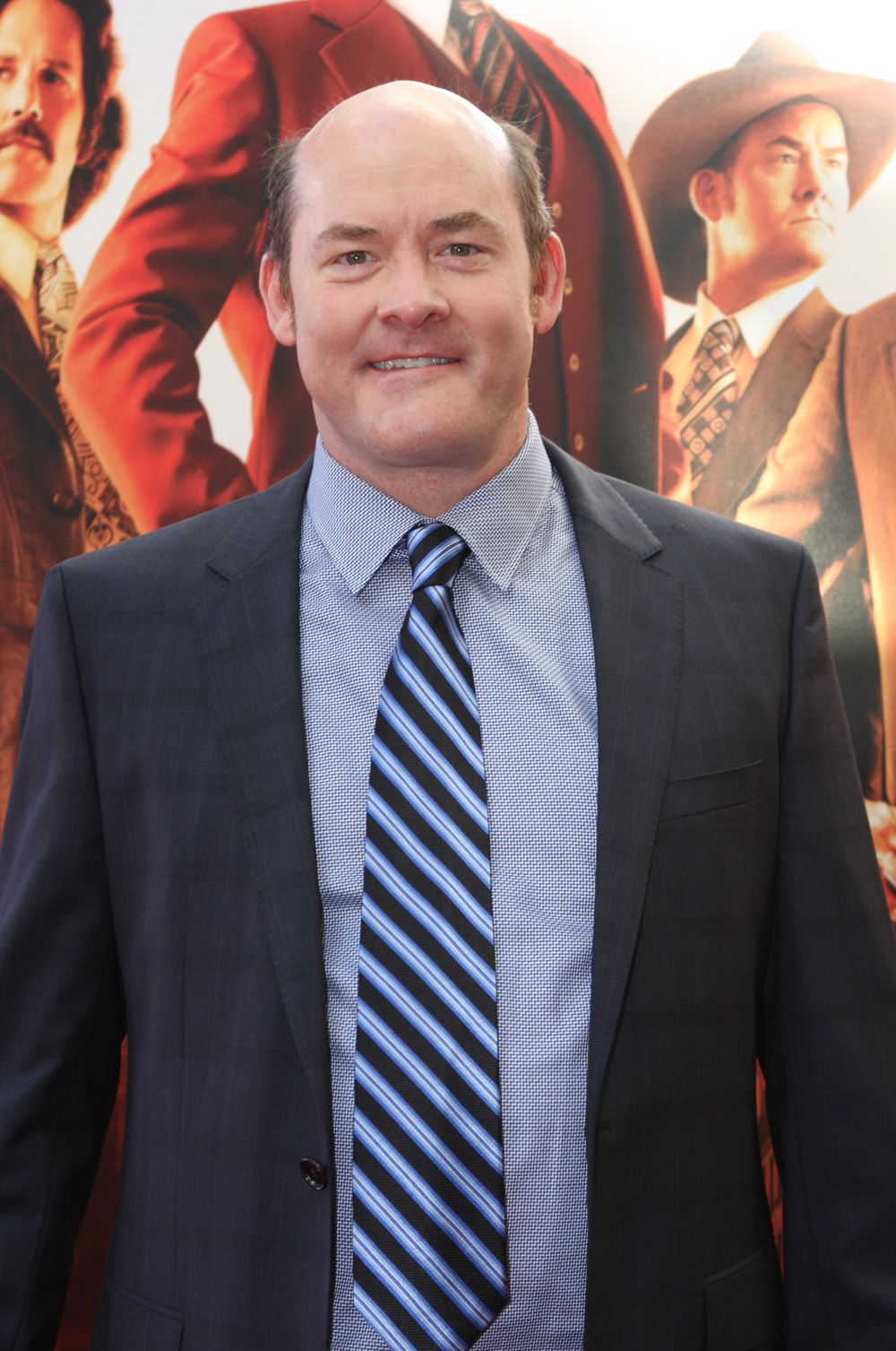
David Koechner portrays Dennis Lapman in Final Destination 5.

- Portrayed by David Koechner
- Appeared in: Final Destination 5
- Status: Deceased

Dennis Lapman is one of the survivors of the North Bay Bridge collapse, and the fourth survivor to die.

Dennis is the general manager of Presage Paper, who is on his way to a company retreat with his workers. Sam Lawton has a premonition about the collapse of the suspension bridge their bus is crossing—in which Dennis is fatally burned by hot tar spilled from a tanker before falling off the bridge. When Sam warns everyone, a confused Dennis follows him out of the bus just as the bridge collapses moments later. He remains skeptical when Peter Friedkin warns him that Death is still after them.

After Roy Carson's death in a warehouse accident, Dennis arrives to confront the remaining survivors until a wrench launched by a belt sander splits his face, killing him.

=== Isaac Palmer ===
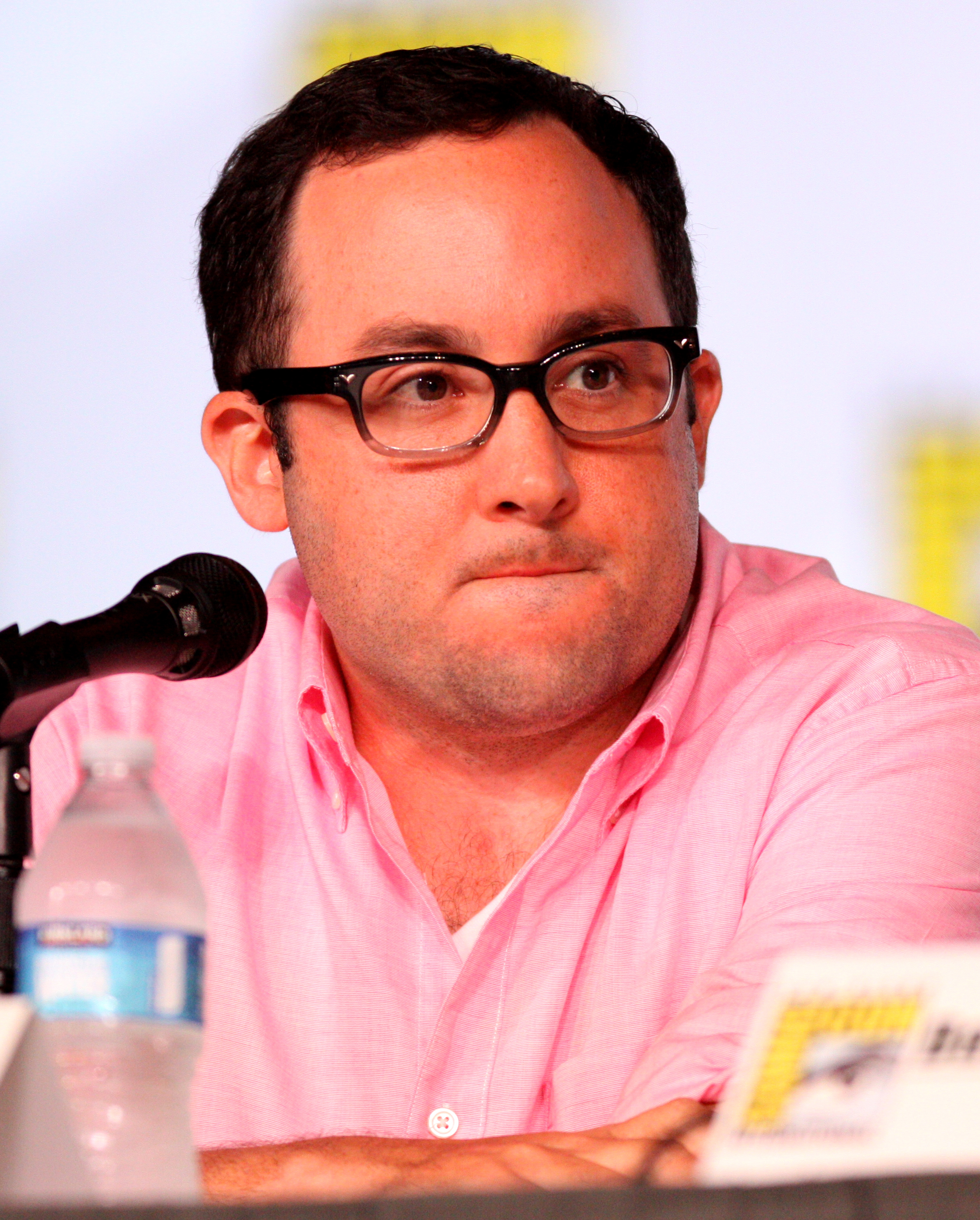
P. J. Byrne portrays Isaac Palmer in Final Destination 5.

- Portrayed by P. J. Byrne
- Appeared in: Final Destination 5
- Status: Deceased

Isaac Palmer is one of the survivors of the North Bay Bridge collapse, and the second survivor to die.

Isaac is a technical support employee at Presage Paper and a pervert womanizer, who is on his way to a company retreat with his co-workers. Sam Lawton has a premonition about the collapse of the suspension bridge their bus is crossing—in which Isaac dies after being trapped inside the bus when it falls into the river. When Sam warns everyone, a confused Isaac follows him out of the bus just as the bridge collapses moments later.

Afterwards, while stealing items from his deceased co-workers' desks, Isaac finds a coupon for a free acupuncture session at a Chinese spa. When the masseuse finishes the session, she leaves him on the table to rest; a burning incense falls onto towels and a fire erupts in the room. The table breaks and Isaac falls face down onto the floor, pushing the needles deep into his skin. The fire worsens when a candle—knocked off a shelf by Isaac's vibrating phone—ignites spilled alcohol used to sterilise the needles. Isaac narrowly avoids the fire, but a shelf that holds a heavy Buddha statue breaks; the statue falls and crushes his head.

In an alternate version, Isaac is burned alive when the fire engulfs his body.

=== Agent Jim Block ===
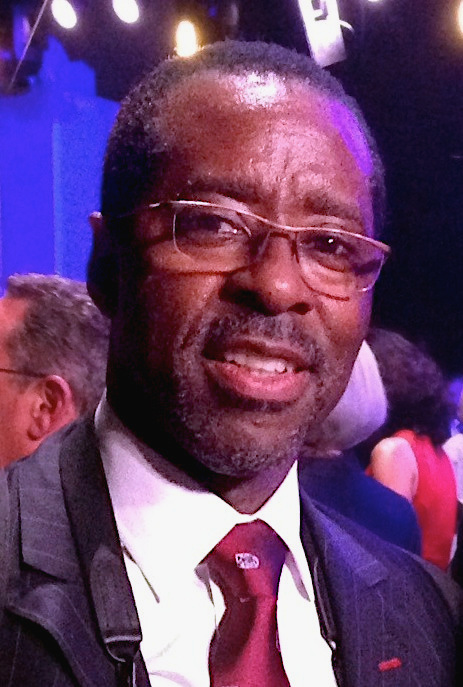
Courtney B. Vance portrays Agent Jim Block in Final Destination 5.

- Portrayed by Courtney B. Vance
- Appeared in: Final Destination 5
- Status: Deceased

Agent Jim Block is an FBI agent who investigates the North Bay Bridge collapse.

Agent Block investigates the North Bay Bridge collapse and initially suspects Sam Lawton of causing the disaster, remaining skeptical of Sam's premonition and the supernatural elements surrounding the event. His suspicion deepens as the survivors die one by one in a series of bizarre accidents. After clearing Sam, Block shifts his focus to Peter Friedkin, who has become unhinged after experiencing the supernatural events. Block is later shot and killed by Peter while attempting to protect Molly Harper, allowing Peter to claim Block's remaining lifespan under the rules of cheating Death. Sam subsequently kills Peter in self-defense, inheriting that stolen lifespan. However, Sam's death two weeks later on Flight 180 implies that Agent Block had a remaining lifespan of only 14 days, suggesting he was already destined to die shortly after the bridge collapse regardless, potentially due to the occupational hazards of his career.

=== Molly Harper ===
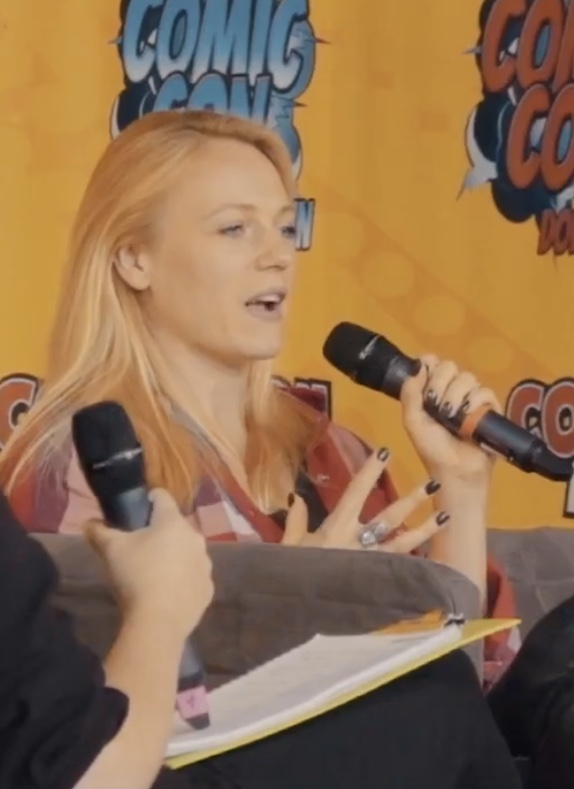
Emma Bell portrays Molly Harper in Final Destination 5.

- Portrayed by Emma Bell
- Appeared in: Final Destination 5
- Status: Deceased

Molly Harper is one of the survivors of the North Bay Bridge collapse, and the sixth survivor to die.

Molly is a sales division employee at Presage Paper, and Sam Lawton's ex-girlfriend, who had broken up with Sam to not hold him back from pursuing his dream of being a chef in Paris. She is on her way to a company retreat with her co-workers when Sam has a premonition about the collapse of the suspension bridge their bus is crossing—in which Molly survives after Sam helps her safely cross the bridge. When Sam warns everyone, a confused Molly follows him out of the bus just as the bridge collapses moments later.

When the survivors begin to die in bizarre accidents, Molly and Sam reconcile and attempt to save the remaining survivors. After the survivors learn from William Bludworth that if they kill someone else they can acquire that person's remaining lifespan, Peter Friedkin tries to kill Molly, but Sam intervenes and kills Peter to save her.

Two weeks later, Molly and Sam board Flight 180 to Paris, where they witness as Alex Browning, Carter Horton, and several other people are thrown off the plane. In mid-air, the fuselage is torn open when the plane's engines explode. Although Sam attempts to save her, Molly is sucked out of the disintegrating aircraft and bisected by the tailplane. Her death demonstrates that she remained on Death's design, with her survival of the bridge collapse serving only to place her on the doomed flight.

=== Nathan Sears ===
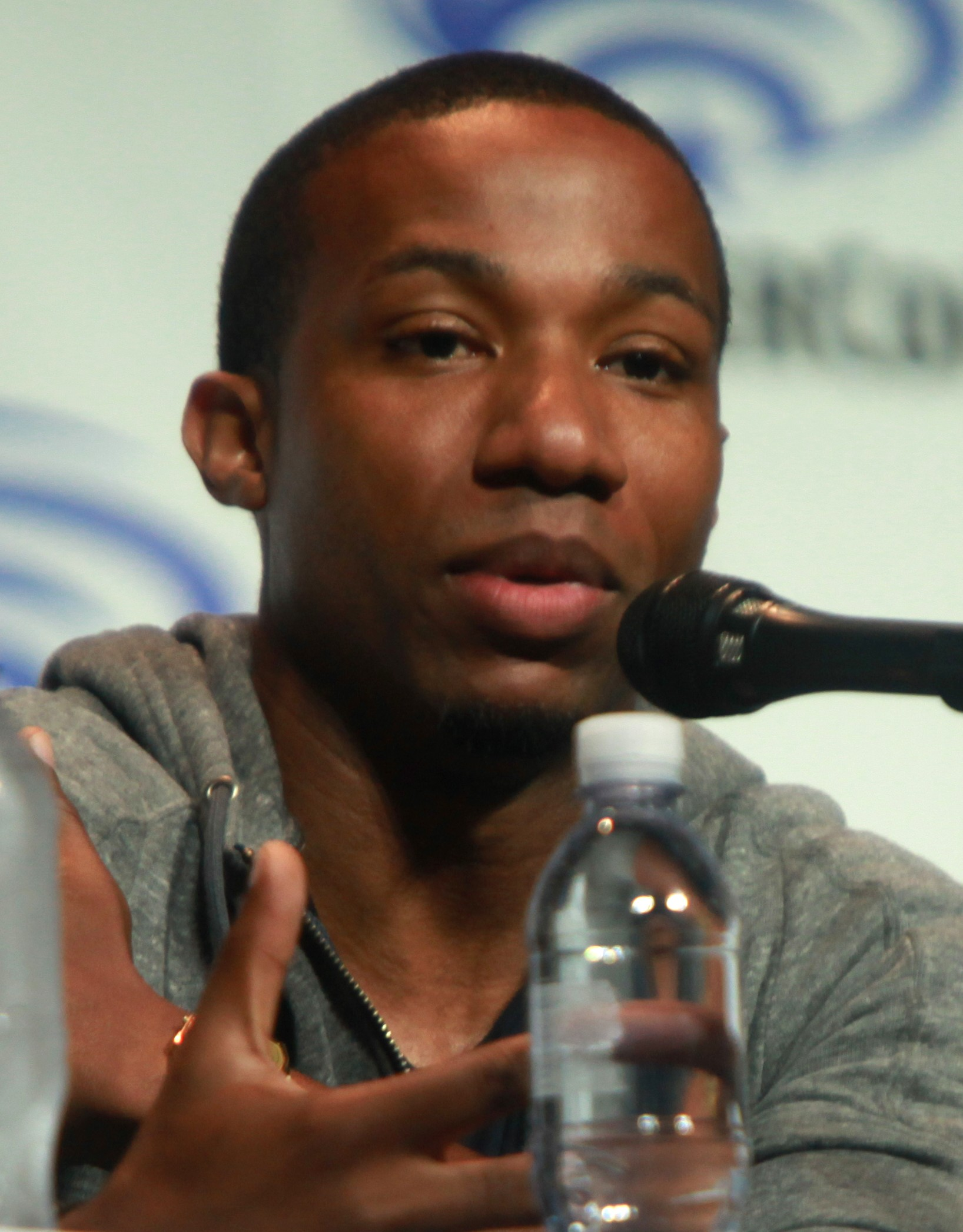
Arlen Escarpeta portrays Nathan Sears in Final Destination 5.

- Portrayed by Arlen Escarpeta
- Appeared in: Final Destination 5
- Status: Deceased

Nathan Sears is one of the survivors of the North Bay Bridge collapse, and the eighth and final survivor to die.

Nathan is a manufacturing supervisor at Presage Paper, who is on his way to a company retreat with his co-workers. Sam Lawton has a premonition about the collapse of the suspension bridge their bus is crossing—in which Nathan is obliterated by a swinging support cable. When Sam warns everyone, a confused Nathan follows him out of the bus just as the bridge collapses moments later.

He is initially skeptical, but later believes that he has cheated Death when he accidentally kills his co-worker Roy Carson in a warehouse accident, this is reinforced when Dennis Lapman (who died after Nathan in Sam's original premonition) is killed by a flying wrench later, while trying to investigate the incident. Two weeks later, at Roy's memorial service, Nathan learns from a co-worker that an autopsy revealed that Roy had a brain aneurysm, which could have killed him in a few days; consequently, Roy had very little lifespan remaining. A few seconds later, Nathan is killed when Flight 180's landing gear crashes through the building and crushes him.

=== Olivia Castle ===
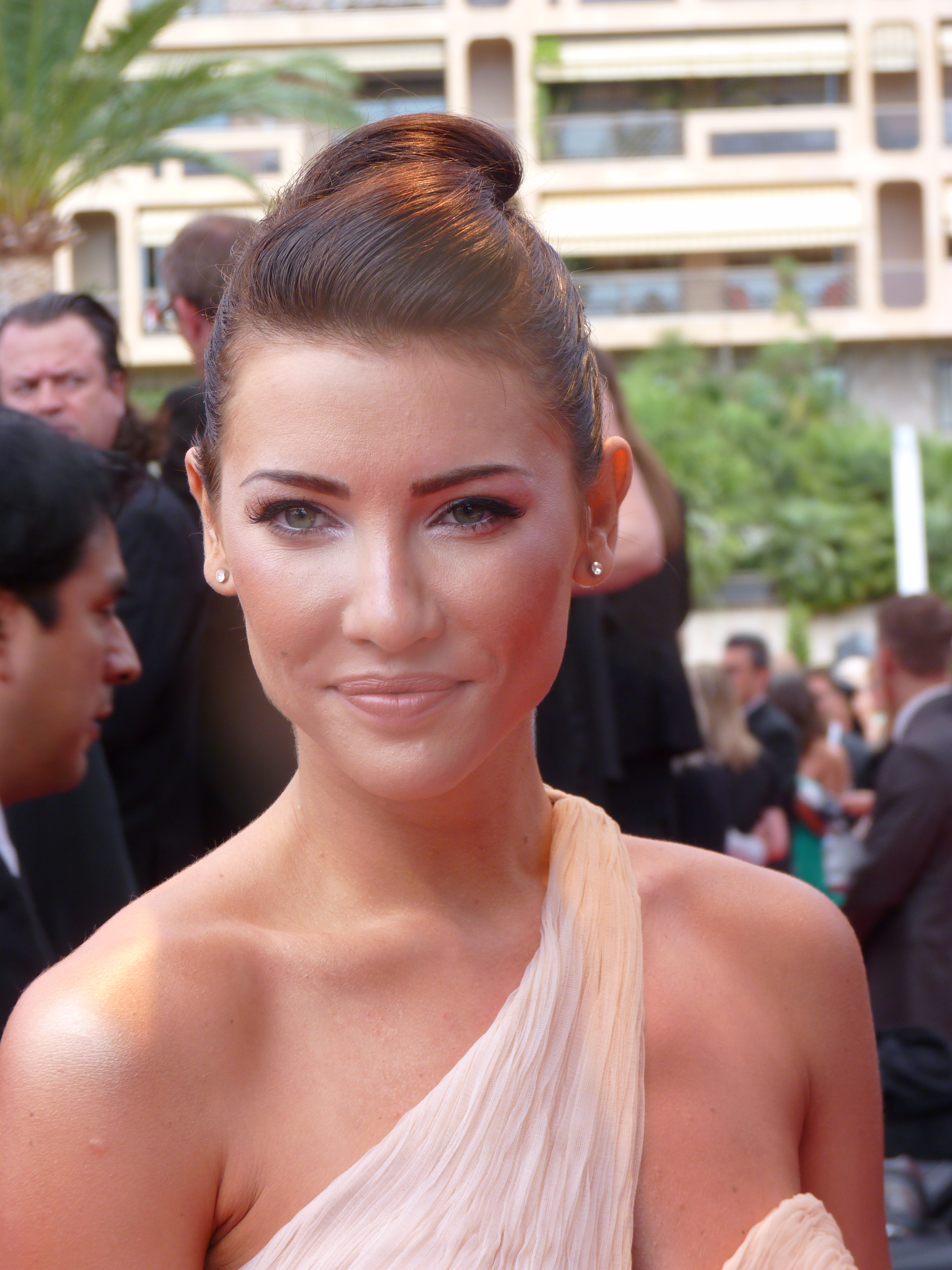
Jacqueline MacInnes Wood portrays Olivia Castle in Final Destination 5.

- Portrayed by Jacqueline MacInnes Wood
- Appeared in: Final Destination 5
- Status: Deceased

Olivia Castle is one of the survivors of the North Bay Bridge collapse, and the third survivor to die.

Olivia is an office assistant at Presage Paper, and Candice Hooper's arch-rival, who is on her way to a company retreat with her co-workers. Sam Lawton has a premonition about the collapse of the suspension bridge their bus is crossing—in which Olivia is crushed by a car after she falls into the river. When Sam warns everyone, a confused Olivia follows him out of the bus just as the bridge collapses moments later.

A few days later, she goes to a LASIK appointment to improve her myopic vision. When the doctor leaves to get Olivia's files, the machine malfunctions and discharges a powerful laser beam that sears her eye and hand. She manages to free herself, but—after Sam, Molly Harper, and the doctor arrive—trips on the dislodged eye of a stuffed teddy bear and falls out of the window. Olivia fatally lands on a car and her eye rolls into the street, where it is run over by another car.

=== Peter Friedkin ===
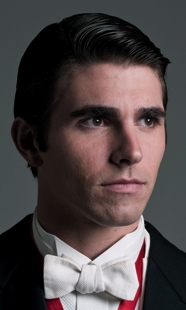
Miles Fisher portrays Peter Friedkin in Final Destination 5.

- Portrayed by Miles Fisher
- Appeared in: Final Destination 5
- Status: Deceased

Peter Friedkin is one of the survivors of the North Bay Bridge collapse, and the fifth survivor to die.

Peter is the manager of Presage Paper, Candice Hooper's boyfriend, and Sam Lawton's best friend. He is on his way to a company retreat with his co-workers when Sam has a premonition about the collapse of the suspension bridge their bus is crossing—in which Peter is impaled by metal rods before falling onto a concrete slab below. When Sam warns everyone, a confused Peter follows him out of the bus just as the bridge collapses moments later.

After he witnesses Candice's death, Peter becomes mentally unstable, and learns from William Bludworth that he can cheat Death if he kills someone else to acquire that person's remaining lifespan. Due to his resentment of Molly Harper being destined to survive the bridge's collapse, Peter decides to take her life. He pursues Molly inside a restaurant and shoots Agent Jim Block dead, acquiring his remaining lifespan. However, Peter resumes pursuing Molly to fulfill his grudge against her and to eliminate any witnesses, until he is finally killed by Sam, who impales him through the back with a meat spit, leading both Sam and Molly to believe that he has now claimed Block's life.

=== Roy Carson ===
- Portrayed by Brent Stait
- Appeared in: Final Destination 5
- Status: Deceased

Roy Carson is a factory worker at Presage Paper, and Nathan Sears's subordinate, who resents him for being his supervisor at a young age. He is killed when Nathan accidentally pushes him in front of a construction hook that falls through the floor and impales him through the chin. Nathan claims Roy's remaining lifespan, but this proves to be insufficient, as it is revealed that Roy had a brain aneurysm that would inevitably have killed him in a few days, just before Nathan is killed by Flight 180's landing gear.

=== Sam Lawton ===
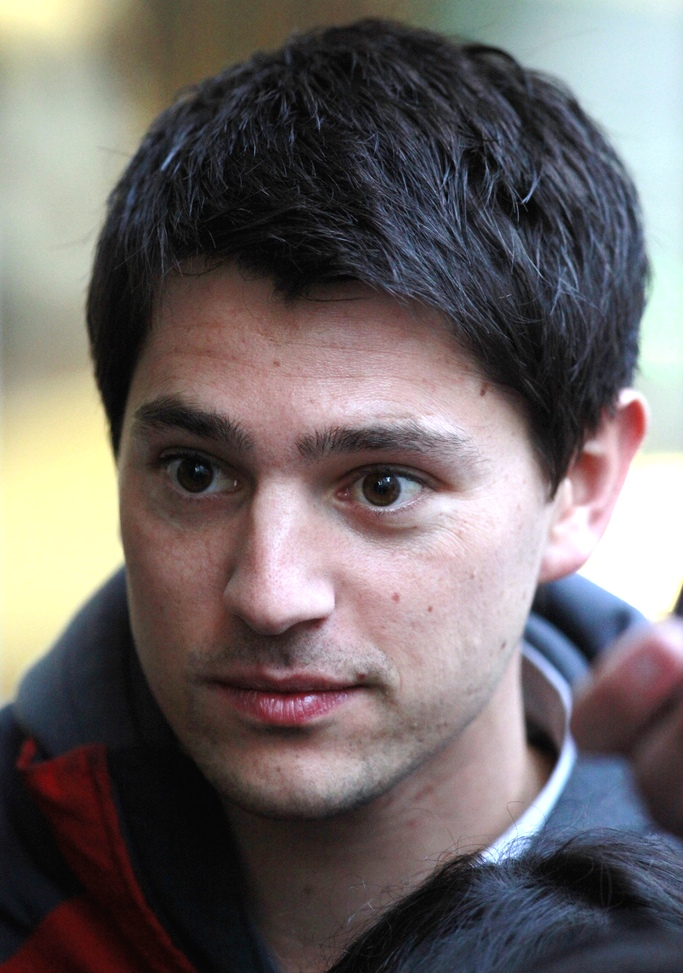
Nicholas D'Agosto portrays Sam Lawton in Final Destination 5.

- Portrayed by Nicholas D'Agosto
- Appeared in: Final Destination 5
- Status: Deceased

Sam Lawton is the protagonist and visionary of Final Destination 5. He is one of the survivors of the North Bay Bridge collapse, and the seventh survivor to die.

Sam is a sales division employee at Presage Paper, Molly Harper's ex-boyfriend, and a trainee chef who dreams of traveling to Paris. While on his way to a company retreat with his co-workers, Sam has a premonition about the collapse of the suspension bridge their bus is crossing, and convinces several co-workers to leave the bus just as the bridge collapses moments later.

He later learns that Death is still after the survivors, and attempts to save the remaining ones with Molly's help. When Peter Friedkin tries to kill Molly after learning that she was never meant to die in the collapse, Sam fatally stabs him in the back with a meat spit, and he assumes that he has taken Agent Jim Block's remaining lifespan, whom Peter had previously taken.

Two weeks later, Sam and Molly board Flight 180 to Paris, where they witness as Alex Browning, Carter Horton, and several other people are thrown off the plane. In mid-air, the fuselage is torn open when the plane's engines explode, and Sam is incinerated by the blast.

== Introduced in Final Destination Bloodlines ==
The Campbell family (from left to right): Charlie Reyes (Teo Briones), Marty Reyes (Tinpo Lee), Stefani Reyes (Kaitlyn Santa Juana), Brenda Campbell (April Amber Telek), Howard Campbell (Alex Zahara), Erik Campbell (Richard Harmon), Julia Campbell (Anna Lore), and Bobby Campbell (Owen Patrick Joyner). Darlene Campbell (Rya Kihlstedt), Iris Campbell (Brec Bassinger / Gabrielle Rose) and Paul Campbell (Max Lloyd-Jones) are absent from the scene.

Final Destination Bloodlines is the sixth film in the Final Destination series. It is split into two time periods, with the main disaster taking place thirty years before the North Bay Bridge collapse and the Flight 180 explosion, while the central narrative is set fifteen years after the McKinley Speedway crash. It focuses on college student Stefani Reyes, whose grandmother Iris Campbell had a premonition about the collapse of a recently inaugurated restaurant tower in 1969. Iris's warnings were heeded and consequently the tower never collapsed, but Death began claiming the lives of the survivors and their descendants generation after generation for being lives that should never have existed.

In the present, when Iris is finally killed, Stefani and her eight remaining relatives—her brother Charlie, her mother Darlene, her father Marty, her uncle Howard, her aunt Brenda, and her cousins Erik, Julia, and Bobby—must find a way to save their bloodline with a book in which Iris compiled information about the previous accidents and their omens to cheat Death.

=== Bobby Campbell ===
- Portrayed by Owen Patrick Joyner
- Appeared in: Final Destination Bloodlines
- Status: Deceased

Bobby Campbell is Iris Campbell's grandson, and the sixth relative to die.

Bobby is a high school student and the youngest son of Howard and Brenda, as well as the youngest sibling of Erik and Julia, and cousin to Stefani and Charlie. Bobby first meets Stefani after her return from college due to her search for Iris. While he is happy seeing Stefani again, he is looking for his pet turtle Paco, which Charlie later finds. After Stefani witnesses Iris' death, Bobby attends the funeral, where his aunt Darlene returns.

Howard starts a barbecue to celebrate the reunited family. Darlene visits and brings cookies, but Bobby is unable to take any due to his deadly peanut allergy. He jumps at a trampoline with Charlie and Howard prior to a series of bizarre events that lead to Howard's death. When Stefani explains Death's design and Iris' findings to the family, Bobby is the only person to consider Stefani's warning and browses their grandmother's book after her. After Erik narrowly avoids an accident and Julia is killed the next day, Bobby realizes he is next and begs Stefani and the family help him survive. Stefani, Charlie, Darlene, and Erik join Bobby as they visit Hope River Hospital to find "JB", an ally of Iris', and they form a protective barrier around him to keep him safe.

They meet JB, mortician William Bludworth, and learn that there are two ways to cheat Death: either by killing someone or by dying and being revived. Although Stefani believes it is hopeless, Erik and Bobby set out to employ Bludworth's second strategy and evade the others, but Erik failed to understand that the last in line on Death's list has a much better chance on revival. Using his allergy as a way to kill and revive him, Bobby gets Erik to order peanut butter cups from a vending machine. However, the snack gets stuck at the end of the coiled spring, and Erik punches his fist repeatedly at the glass in frustration, causing it to crack. He then moves behind the vending machine and tilts it over to get the snack out with Bobby's help, causing the spring to come loose in the process. Erik takes Bobby into a room with an MRI machine, which unknowingly turns on as Erik leaves to grab a wheelchair for Bobby to sit in.

Bobby eats the peanut butter cups to exploit his fatal allergy, which Erik would provide an EpiPen for. As Bobby's allergy kicks in, Erik evades Bobby's attempts to reach him due to him needing to die first before he could wheel him out to be saved by the doctors. The plan backfires as the MRI machine malfunctions, magnetically ripping out Erik's piercings and impaling him with the wheelchair, pulling him into the machine and fatally crushing him with his spine being bent backwards. After Erik's death, Bobby crawls over to retrieve the EpiPen left in his hand, using it on himself to stop his allergy.

As Bobby stands back up, the malfunctioning MRI machine alerts a nurse, who opens the door to check on the situation. The loose spring from the vending machine gets caught in its magnetic force as a result, launching from the cracked glass and drilling into Bobby's head, killing him. Searching for them, Stefani, Charlie, and Darlene arrive too late to find Erik and Bobby's bodies. Stefani, Charlie, and Marty later went on to care for Paco.

=== Brenda Campbell ===
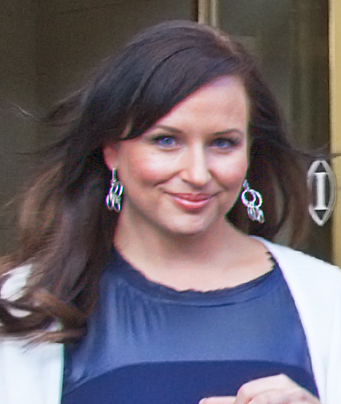
April Telek portrays Brenda Campbell in Final Destination Bloodlines.

- Portrayed by April Telek
- Appeared in: Final Destination Bloodlines
- Status: Alive

Brenda Campbell is Iris Campbell's daughter-in-law.

She is the wife of Howard and the mother of Erik, Julia and Bobby. During the rough earlier years in their marriage because of the Campbell family's dysfunctions caused by her mother-in-law Iris, Brenda had an affair with a man named Jerry Fenbury, which conceived Erik. Iris's disruptions force Brenda's family to relocate repeatedly; Howard, who was already estranged from his mother, subsequently blames Iris for his wife's adultery.

She happily greets her niece Stefani and nephew Charlie upon their visit; however, she and Howard are disturbed when Stefani begins asking about Iris. She and Howard explain Howard and Darlene's difficult upbringing under Iris, as well as Iris sending them several letters of obituaries and gruesome pictures of dead bodies to warn them about Death and his design. Despite this, Brenda helps Stefani find the letters, which leads Stefani to Iris. Stefani witnesses Iris' death, and Brenda attends the funeral with her family.

Howard holds a barbecue to celebrate their reunited family, but he is killed in a brutal accident, horrifying Brenda. Stefani later echoes Iris' teachings on Death and its design to the family. Due to being an in-law, Brenda is spared from Death's list. However, nobody believes her, and Brenda is distressed hearing her children are next and their deaths are by design, and Erik and Julia leave to comfort their mother after chastising Stefani.

Erik narrowly survives an accident later that night and Julia is killed the next day, making Brenda finally believe Stefani. As Brenda grieves her daughter's death, Stefani apologizes to her for getting the order wrong. Brenda admits blame as she reveals Erik was born from an affair with Jerry Fenbury. Brenda attempts to comfort the stunned Erik by sharing that Howard accepted him as his own, but Erik storms off and she follows him. She is not seen in the film afterwards.

=== Charlie Reyes ===
- Portrayed by Teo Briones
- Appeared in: Final Destination Bloodlines
- Status: Deceased

Charlie Reyes is Iris Campbell's grandson. He is the ninth and final relative to die.

Charlie is a high school student and the younger son of Marty and Darlene, and younger brother of Stefani. He is cold towards Stefani for ghosting him when she went off to college, and finds solace in his cousins Erik, Julia, and Bobby. He is also an aspiring junior lifeguard and asked out his fellow lifeguard and student, Jenny Reddick, to prom with him.

When he and Stefani visit their cousins so Stefani can know more about Iris, Stefani observes how her cousins seem to be closer with and to know more about Charlie than she does. After Stefani witnesses Iris' death, Charlie is among those who attends his grandmother's funeral. Upon Darlene's return at the funeral after abandoning them in childhood, he follows Stefani to her car, resentful for their mother's abandonment. Charlie calls out Stefani's hypocrisy for cutting off contact with them just their mother did.

His uncle Howard later holds a family barbecue, where Charlie informs his mom about his lifeguarding job. However, Howard dies in a brutal accident. After his funeral, Stefani explains to the family about Death and its design from Iris' book, but Charlie is unsure about his sister's claims. He joins her to check up on Erik after he is caught in his workplace burning down. Julia is caught in a garbage truck during a morning jog, and Charlie, Stefani, and Erik are unable to save her. Stefani predicting the exact way Julia would be knocked inside the truck causes Charlie to finally believe his sister.

Charlie goes with Stefani, Darlene, Erik, and Bobby to William Bludworth to figure out how to beat Death. He and his mother comfort Stefani when she loses hope, however they lose track of Erik and Bobby and find them dead. The three decide to leave to Iris' cabin, where Darlene will stay to keep her children alive. The three arrive at the cabin, where Darlene and Charlie drop down first while Stefani is stuck. A series of events cause Iris' cabin to explode, but Charlie is narrowly saved by his mother before she is killed. He rescues Stefani from drowning by applying CPR, and informs her that while they cheated Death, their mother did not make it.

One week later, Stefani and Marty join Charlie to bring Jenny to prom. Jenny's father informs them that her successful CPR meant that she never flatlined, hence she never died. Soon after, a forestry goods train derails into the neighborhood, and its cargo crushes and kills Stefani and Charlie.

=== Darlene Campbell ===
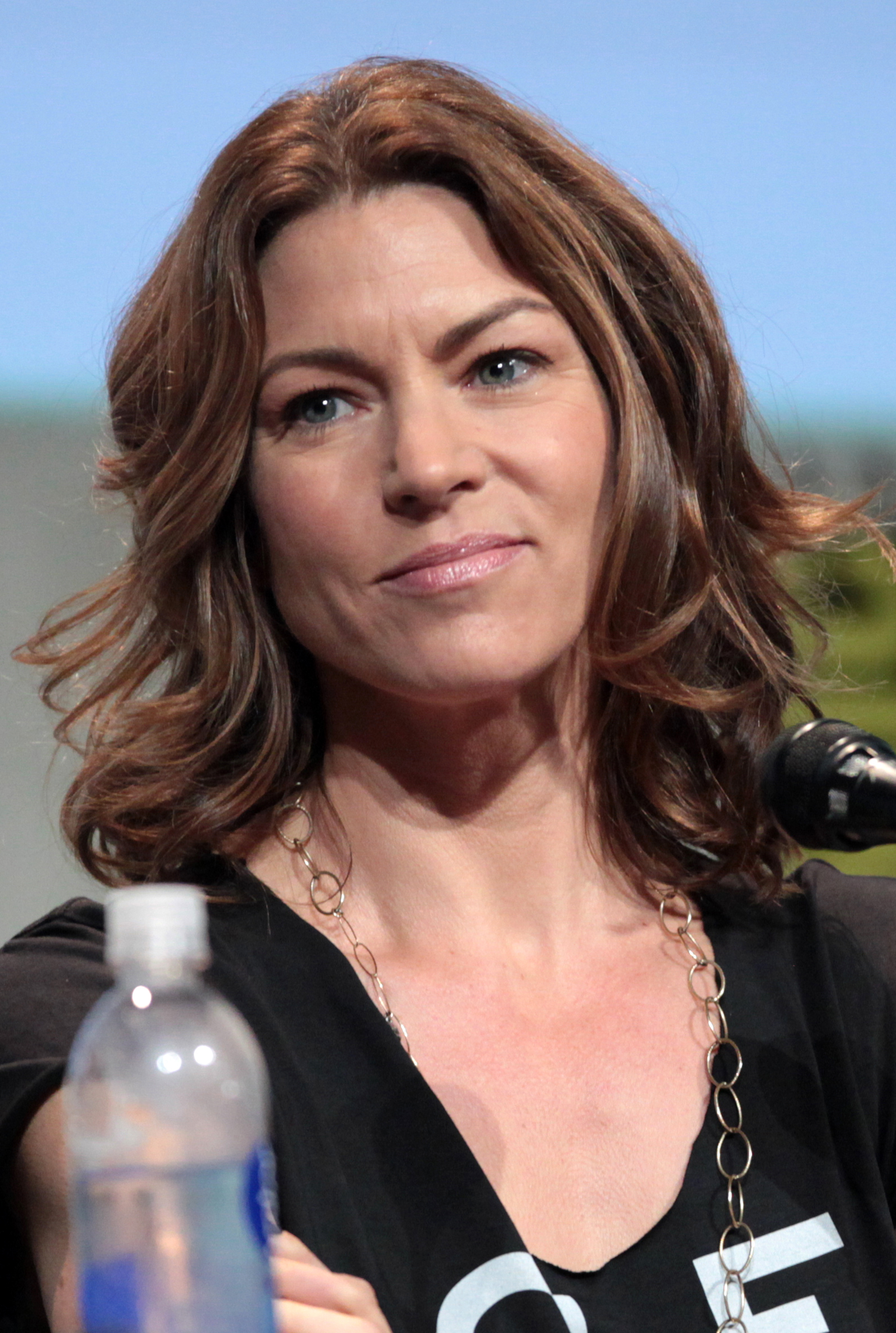
Rya Kihlstedt portrays Darlene Lewis in Final Destination Bloodlines.

- Portrayed by Rya Kihlstedt
- Appeared in: Final Destination Bloodlines
- Status: Deceased

Darlene Campbell is Iris Campbell's daughter, and the seventh relative to die.

Darlene is the ex-wife of Marty, mother to Stefani and Charlie, and younger sister of Howard. Howard and Darlene grew up in an overprotective environment by their mother Iris after the death of their father Paul. The siblings eventually were sent to live in foster care away from their mother. While Darlene would go on to marry Marty and have Stefani and Charlie, she had begun raising her kids similarly to her mother, and eventually abandons her family. She goes on to live in an RV.

After Iris dies, Howard contacts Darlene, who arrives at the funeral in her RV. Howard and Marty greet her, but Stefani is resentful for abandoning them when she was a child. Howard holds a family barbecue which Darlene attends. The reunited siblings bond over their terrible childhoods and Darlene declines an offer from Howard to stay with them. Howard is killed in a brutal and bizarre accident shortly afterwards.

Following Howard's funeral, Stefani then shares her findings about Death and its design to the family, who dismiss her. Scaring for her daughter after seeing Stefani exhibits eccentric behaviors much like her mother's, Darlene attempts to dissuade Stefani, but she angrily rebuffs her. Darlene finally believes Stefani after Howard's daughter Julia is killed, albeit Marty is disappointed and leaves in frustration.

As Howard's youngest son Bobby is next, Darlene offers to bring Stefani, Charlie, Bobby, and Bobby's brother Erik to the Hope Rivers Hospital to find Iris' ally JB. During the ride, Darlene attempts to reconcile with Stefani, explaining that she realized her children were looking at her like she viewed Iris, and that she felt they were better off without her in their lives. At the hospital, they meet JB - mortician William Bludworth, who explains to them the rules on how to cheat Death. Stefani is unwilling to kill or die to cheat Death, and Darlene and Charlie comfort her. After Erik and Bobby are killed, the three decide to leave to Iris' cabin, where Darlene will stay to keep her children alive while they finding more options.

The three arrive at the cabin, where Darlene and Charlie drop down first while Stefani is stuck. A series of events cause Iris' cabin to explode, seriously burning and injuring Darlene. She manages to lift Charlie out from rubble that had pinned him. She begs her son to save Stefani, and tells him she will try to stay alive as long as possible. However, a falling lamp post bisects her on the spot. Charlie manages to save Stefani, but they mourn Darlene's death together.

=== Erik Campbell ===
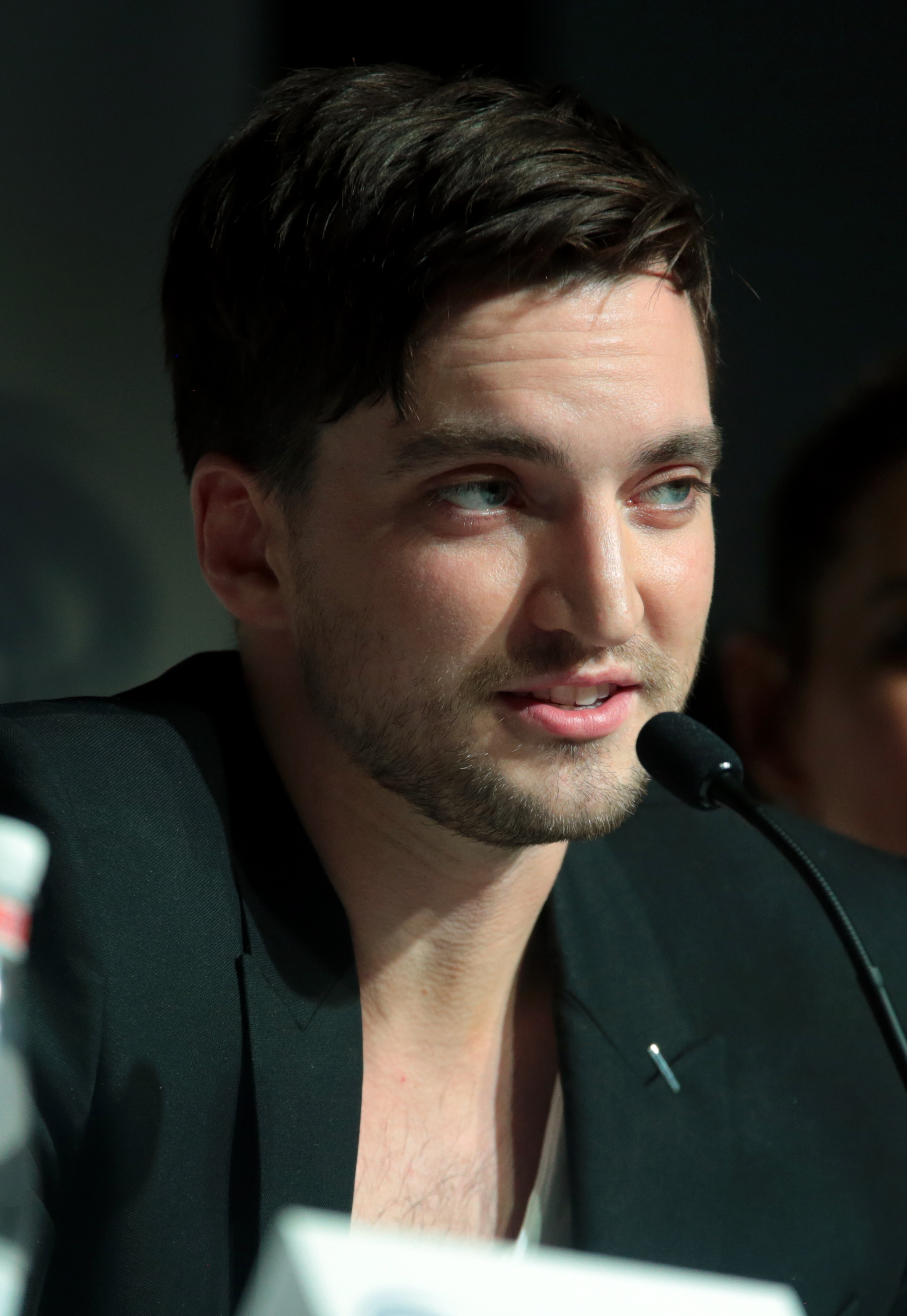
Richard Harmon portrays Erik Campbell in Final Destination Bloodlines.

- Portrayed by Richard Harmon
- Appeared in: Final Destination Bloodlines
- Status: Deceased

Erik Campbell is Iris Campbell's grandson in name, and the fifth relative to die.

Erik is a tattoo artist and the son of Howard and Brenda, as well as the older brother of Julia and Bobby, and eldest cousin to Stefani and Charlie. Erik first meets Stefani after her return due to her search for Iris, whom he dismisses as their "psycho granny." After Stefani witnesses Iris' death, Erik attends the funeral.

Howard holds a family barbecue, but he is killed in a bizarre accident. When Stefani presents her findings about how Death is after their family, he is skeptical about her theory and is offended when Stefani claims he is next. He is forced to return to work later that night despite the recent tragedy. After he finishes working with a customer inside his tattoo parlor, he turns on his ceiling fan, which spins dangerously close to some hanging chains. Erik checks his phone to insult Stefani's concerned messages via text. He sees Howard's photo in his phone; wanting to remember his father, he goes over to work on a tattoo for himself.

The vibrations from a subwoofer cause a bobblehead skeleton to fall from its place, colliding with other materials before a glass jar full of needles falls and shatters the floor. Erik proceeds to clean it, but pushes his chair too hard, and it hits a gallon of isopropyl alcohol. After the gallon falls over, it spills while a chain from the ceiling breaks and attaches itself to Erik's nose ring.

Erik panics as the chain wraps itself around the fan and pulls him up closer to the ceiling. He struggles to free himself but fails to detach the chain. In the process, Erik knocks over a lamp into the spilled alcohol, starting a fire. Erik tries to stand on a glass display case, but it breaks under his weight and forces him to move to the nearby tattoo bed. The fan slowly breaks apart as Erik swings towards the fire, pulling the fan out and making him fall into the flames. Despite this, he survives due to his leather jacket.

The next day, Stefani and Charlie hear of Erik's accident and check on him, with Erik still not believing them despite narrowly being run over by a speeding truck. However, Julia is killed immediately after, finally convincing him. When pondering why Erik was skipped, Brenda reveals that he is not Howard's biological son, which apparently exempts him from Death's list. Brenda and Howard's marriage was heavily strained by Iris's harassment, driving Brenda into an affair with Jerry Fenbury. Though Erik was conceived from this affair, Howard accepted him as his own son. It is later implied by Skyview Tower survivor William Bludworth that Iris was fully aware Erik shared no blood relation to her.

Bobby is next on the list, so Erik joins the family in going to the Hope Rivers Hospital. He meets Bludworth, who informs them about Death's design and warns them that interfering with it may lead to consequences. Erik does this by attempting to save Bobby's life at the hospital after sneaking off from the rest of the family, feeding him nuts to exploit his fatal allergy, which he would provide an EpiPen. Before they could take action, he is caught by a malfunctioning MRI machine that magnetically pulls his piercings. He is pulled into the machine and crushed and impaled by a wheelchair, killing him. Bobby is killed shortly afterwards. Stefani contextualizes Erik's demise by invoking Iris and Bludworth's warning that "when you fuck with Death, things get messy," underscoring how any disruption of the supernatural design triggers lethal retaliation. Consequently, despite not truly being a member of the Campbell bloodline, Erik could not escape fate. As his birth was an unavoidable ripple effect of Iris's actions, he was always destined to face Death's design.

=== Howard Campbell ===
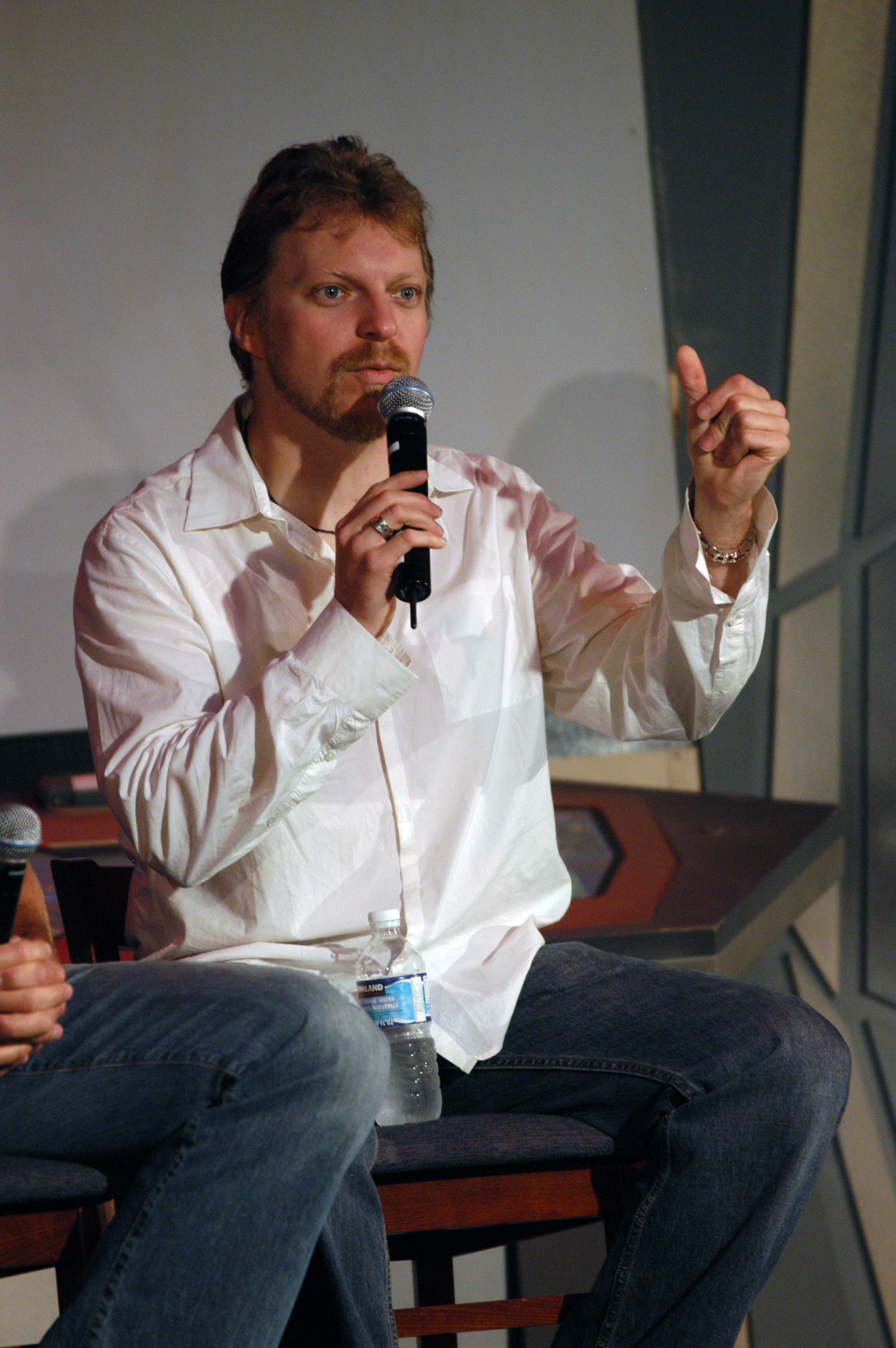
Alex Zahara portrays Howard Campbell in Final Destination Bloodlines.

- Portrayed by Alex Zahara
- Appeared in: Final Destination Bloodlines
- Status: Deceased

Howard Campbell is Iris Campbell's son, and the third relative to die.

He is the husband of Brenda, the older brother of Darlene, stepfather of Erik, father of Julia and Bobby, and uncle to Stefani and Charlie. He enthusiastically meets Stefani when she returns from college, though he is troubled when Stefani mentions Iris. Howard tells his niece that her grandmother is a disturbed woman who went to great lengths to keep him and Darlene safe after the death of his father Paul. He cites this as the cause of Darlene's abandonment of Stefani and Charlie and advises her to stay away. Brenda covertly helps Stefani find Iris, but she witnesses her death instead. Howard is among the family who attends her funeral, and happily greets Darlene's return with her husband Marty.

Howard holds a family barbecue, where he toasts to their reunited family and shares his love for them. Darlene arrives, and Howard bonds with her over their childhoods, and he offers her to stay with them. During the barbecue, Bobby accidentally misplaces a glass cup that shatters. One shard falls into the cooler and is scooped up into Marty's beverage. Howard is playing Jenga with Erik, Julia and Marty, but before the shard could injure Marty, Howard is called to the trampoline where Bobby and Charlie are jumping on and Marty sets his glass aside to cheer Howard on. Darlene narrowly removes a rake under the trampoline and sets it aside. Meanwhile, Brenda places a bowl onto a table and knocks a bottle off that turns on a hose. The hose inflates and causes gardening equipment to shuffle around.

Howard sees Stefani arriving and happily drops down the trampoline to greet her, noting that their family is finally complete. Bobby breaks through the trampoline while Julia's Jenga tower falls; the latter spills Marty's beverage and sends the shard onto the grass. Howard accidentally steps onto the shard and falls backward as the hose causes the rake that Darlene set aside to hit a lawn mower's power button, causing the lawn mower to run over Howard's face, slicing him to death. Howard's death convinces Stefani that Death is now hunting her family's bloodline.

=== Iris Campbell ===
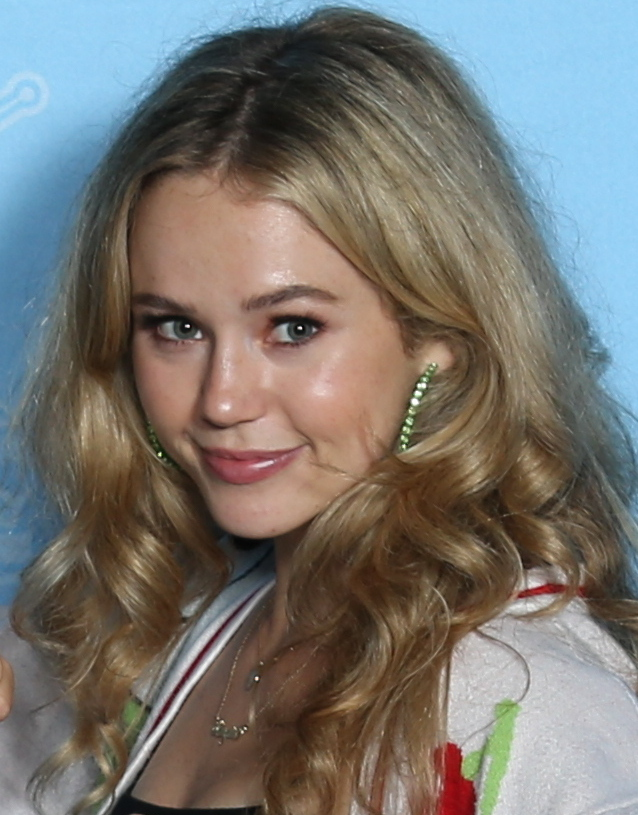
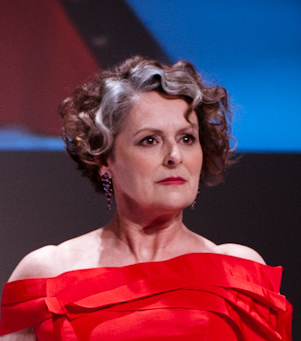
Brec Bassinger and Gabrielle Rose portray a younger and older Iris Campbell in Final Destination Bloodlines.
- Portrayed by Brec Bassinger (young) and Gabrielle Rose (old)
- Appeared in: Final Destination Bloodlines
- Status: Deceased

Iris Campbell is the visionary of Final Destination Bloodlines. She is one of the survivors of the 1969 Skyview Restaurant Tower collapse, and the second relative to die.

Iris visited the tower in 1969 with her then-boyfriend Paul while pregnant with Howard. Paul planned to propose to Iris. However, she received a premonition of the tower's collapse as well as her and Paul's deaths. She prevented many other people from staying in the tower, and hundreds of people survived as she prevented the tower's collapse, with the tower being closed after several inspections. However, the survivors and their descendants started to die one by one in the same order they should have died on the restaurant.

Iris gave birth to her children Howard and Darlene, although Paul was killed in an accident, which led her to begin thinking of possible ways to protect her children from Death. She managed to cheat Death dozens of times, working with fellow tower survivor William Bludworth on how to figure out Death's patterns. She kept records of all her knowledge in a book, including the events of the previous films. Despite this, her overprotective upbringing of her children led to friction between them and ultimately estrangement. Howard and Darlene would be removed by the state, yet Iris tracked them through foster care. She went on to live an isolated life to keep herself safe, as her death would begin trickling down to her family. This deteriorates her mental health with Bludworth is her only contact outside. When Howard and Darlene had their own families, Iris would send them morbid letters with obituaries and gruesome images. The trauma caused by her parenting of Howard and Darlene would trickle down through each generation, with Darlene's paranoia from her upbringing causing her to decide to leave her own family, and Darlene's daughter Stefani eventually ghosting the family to focus on academics as well. Iris eventually is diagnosed with terminal cancer, causing her premonition of the tower collapse to be passed on to her granddaughter Stefani through nightmares.

Stefani visits and meets the now-terminally ill Iris for answers on her nightmares, and Iris shares her story about the tower collapse. Though Stefani is skeptical and leaves early, Iris leaves her cabin to give her the book and tells her it is her turn to save their family. To prove her claims, she submits to Death's plan to willingly die: a chain reaction causes a weather vane to fatally impale her through the mouth, which is similar to how she died in her premonition at Skyview. Her death kickstarts her family being killed one by one, and Stefani ultimately fails. However, the closing credits imply that a new individual has taken possession of Iris's book after the deaths of Darlene's children. This is indicated by new journal pages featuring a newspaper headline about the siblings, suggesting that the cycle of tracking Death's design is ongoing.

=== Julia Campbell ===
- Portrayed by Anna Lore
- Appeared in: Final Destination Bloodlines
- Status: Deceased

Julia Campbell is Iris Campbell's granddaughter, and the fourth relative to die.

Julia is the second born daughter of Howard and Brenda, sister to Erik and Bobby, and older cousin to Stefani and Charlie. Julia and Stefani used to be close, but after Stefani left for college and ghosted them, Julia became resentful towards her, and in time, taking over her role as an older sister figure to Charlie. Upon Stefani's return, she and Charlie visit the cousins where Julia is surprised to see her but coldly ignores her to chat with Charlie. She is surprised to hear Stefani is looking for their grandmother, who she thought was long dead. After Stefani witnesses Iris' death, the family including Julia attend her funeral.

Later on, Howard holds a family barbecue to celebrate their reunited family, but a chain of events causes Howard's death which Julia witnesses in horror. After Howard's funeral, Stefani explains to the family Death's design, which distresses Brenda and causes Julia to lash out at Stefani for turning her father's death into a conspiracy.

Erik later survives an accident at his tattoo parlor, and Julia checks up on him as she goes for a jog, and dismisses Stefani's beliefs on death again as "garbage." As she begins her jog, a tree trimmer falls over, knocking over a man with a leaf blower and blowing leaves into two kids who are playing with a soccer ball. The ball hits Julia in the face, knocking her into a trash bin that is being lifted into a garbage truck. As Stefani, Charlie and Erik chase after the truck, its trash compactor activates with Julia still inside. Stefani climbs a ladder to get onto the truck and grabs Julia's hand in an attempt to save her, while Erik and Charlie run ahead to stop the driver. The force from the sudden stop causes Julia to fall deeper into the compactor where she is subsequently crushed to death, severing her arm and the top part of her head. Her death distresses her family and causes them to finally believe Stefani.

=== Marty Reyes ===
- Portrayed by Tinpo Lee
- Appeared in: Final Destination Bloodlines
- Status: Alive

Marty Reyes is Iris Campbell's son-in-law.

Marty is the ex-husband of Darlene and father to Stefani and Charlie. Darlene had echoed her mother Iris' teachings on Stefani and Charlie, causing their marriage to have friction. Darlene later abandoned the family, leaving Marty to raise his children alone.

Marty happily greets Stefani upon her return from college. However, he is surprised when she asks for her mother's belongings, as he had thrown them out years ago, as well as her questions about her grandmother Iris. When Stefani decides to accompany Charlie to their cousins' house, Marty advises Stefani not to bring up Iris to her uncle Howard, which she ignores.

After Stefani witnesses Iris' death, Marty awkwardly reunites with Darlene at the funeral. Marty joins the family at a barbecue organized by Howard, but he witnesses Howard's brutal death during the party. After Howard's funeral, Marty listens as Stefani explains Death and its design to the family. Due to being an in-law, he is spared from Death's list. Despite this, he does not believe his daughter.

After Erik survives an accident and Julia is killed, Marty joins the family in grieving Julia. Most of the family believe Stefani, however Marty continues to dismiss his daughter's beliefs. As Darlene backs up Stefani, he chastises his ex-wife, saying that belief was what caused their family to be torn apart. Darlene defends herself, causing him to leave in frustration.

Although Darlene is killed, Charlie manages to save Stefani from drowning. Marty cares for Paco, the turtle of his late nephew Bobby. Marty and Stefani join Charlie as he goes to his prom date, Jenny Reddick. Marty introduces Stefani and Charlie to Jenny's father, a doctor, who explains that Stefani never died if she was revived quickly. A train accident then occurs, narrowly evading Marty, but Stefani and Charlie are crushed by logs nearby.

=== Paul Campbell ===
- Portrayed by Max Lloyd-Jones
- Appeared in: Final Destination Bloodlines
- Status: Deceased

Paul Campbell is Iris Campbell's husband. He is one of the survivors of the 1969 Skyview Restaurant Tower collapse, and the first relative to die.

Paul surprises Iris at the Sky View's opening where he managed to snag an invite due to his connections. Although the maitre'd turns them away, both of them manage to sneak in. He brings her up to the observation deck where he proposes to her. Accepting his proposal, Iris reveals that she is pregnant with his baby. Paul is overjoyed and excited to start a family with her. However, Iris receives a premonition that the tower would collapse. During the premonition, the couple dance in the see-through glass dance floor. However, the brittle glass breaks through, and Paul attempts to hold on to the glass. However, he slips and falls to his death, with his head hitting a beam. The horrified Iris snaps out of her premonition during his proposal, and Iris warns everyone, saving everyone including Paul.

Paul and Iris would later marry and have their children Howard and Darlene together. However, Paul would die in an unspecified way some time during their kids' childhood, which causes Iris to raise their children in an overprotective environment fearful of death.

=== Stefani Reyes ===
- Portrayed by Kaitlyn Santa Juana
- Appeared in: Final Destination Bloodlines
- Status: Deceased

Stefani Reyes is the protagonist of Final Destination Bloodlines. She is Iris Campbell's granddaughter, and the eighth relative to die. She is notably the only protagonist who is not a visionary.

Stefani is a college student who is on scholarship after being an overachiever in high school. However, she has recurring nightmares of a premonition that her grandmother had about the fire and collapse of a newly opened restaurant tower in 1969, which affects her current studies and puts her on probation. To find answers, she returns home and reunites with her family, who have become estranged from her after she stopped contacting them. While she is welcomed by her father Marty, her brother Charlie and cousin Julia whom she used to be close with are resentful of her abandonment, especially since Stefani and Charlie were also abandoned by their mother Darlene when they were children. Her aunt Brenda gives her the address to Iris' cabin, where she meets her grandmother for the first time, who is now terminally ill.

Stefani finds out that Iris saved many people from dying in the restaurant due to her premonition, but Death has begun claiming their lives as well as their descendants'. Stefani is reluctant to believe her and leaves, but Iris pursues her and gives her a book she has compiled showing Death's design, telling her that it is her turn to save their family. Iris willingly dies in front of Stefani, horrifying her.

After Iris' funeral, Darlene returns, but Stefani is resentful. Charlie points out her hypocrisy since she abandoned him as well when she stopped contacting them. Stefani reads Iris' book and sees a reference to a "JB", who found someone who defeated Death, and seeing that Death's actions resemble equations of vector multiplication, allowing her to anticipate them like Iris. When her uncle Howard is killed, Stefani now believes Iris and desperately shares her knowledge to her family, but they do not believe her, thinking she has gone crazy like Iris. Her cousin Erik narrowly escapes an accident that night while Julia is killed the next day, making the family finally believe her, however Marty walks out on them.

Stefani, Charlie, Darlene, and Erik and his brother Bobby visit "JB", who is William Bludworth, a survivor of the tower collapse who is retiring from his job as a mortician. He has been in contact with Iris on figuring out Death's rules and how to cheat it. He does not expect them to succeed, making Stefani feel hopeless. Erik and Bobby are killed shortly afterwards, and Stefani, Charlie, and Darlene flee on Darlene's RV to Iris' cabin to hide out from Death. The cabin explodes after a chain reaction, sending the RV into water as Stefani begins to drown when her seatbelt jams. After Darlene is killed, Charlie breaks the seatbelt and successfully resuscitates Stefani with CPR, but the siblings mourn their mother.

One week later, the father of Charlie's prom date tells the siblings that Stefani never went through a sudden cardiac arrest, meaning she only had a respiratory arrest and Charlie prevented her clinical death by getting her breathe again before her heart stopped beating, leading them to realize the implication. Soon after, a timber goods train derails into the Campbell family's old neighborhood, and its cargo kills Stefani and Charlie.
