= 2025 Sport Clips Haircuts VFW 200 =

8th race of the 2025 NASCAR Xfinity Series

Race details
- Race 8 of 33 of the 2025 NASCAR Xfinity Series
- Date: April 5, 2025
- Official name: 43rd Annual Sport Clips Haircuts VFW Help a Hero 200
- Location: Darlington Raceway in Darlington, South Carolina
- Course: Permanent racing facility
- Course length: 1.366 miles (2.198 km)
- Distance: 147 laps, 200 mi (323 km)
- Scheduled distance: 147 laps, 200 mi (323 km)
- Average speed: 104.812 mph (168.679 km/h)

Pole position
| Driver | Christopher Bell | Joe Gibbs Racing |
- Time: 29.911

Most laps led
| Driver | Justin Allgaier | JR Motorsports |
- Laps: 56

Winner
| No. 20 | Brandon Jones | Joe Gibbs Racing |

Television in the United States
- Network: The CW
- Announcers: Adam Alexander, Jamie McMurray, and Parker Kligerman

Radio in the United States
- Radio: MRN

The 2025 Sport Clips Haircuts VFW Help a Hero 200 was the 8th stock car race of the 2025 NASCAR Xfinity Series, and the 43rd iteration of the event. The race was held on Saturday, April 5, 2025, at Darlington Raceway in Darlington, South Carolina, a 1.366 miles (2.198 km) permanent egg-shaped racetrack. The race took the scheduled 147 laps to complete.

Brandon Jones, driving for Joe Gibbs Racing, would take over the lead on the final restart, leading the final 11 laps to earn his sixth career NASCAR Xfinity Series win, and his first of the season, snapping a 98-race winless streak. Justin Allgaier was dominant for a majority of the race, winning the second stage and leading a race-high 56 laps, ending up with a third place finish. To fill out the podium, Chase Elliott, driving for Hendrick Motorsports, would finish in 2nd, respectively.

== Report ==
=== Background ===
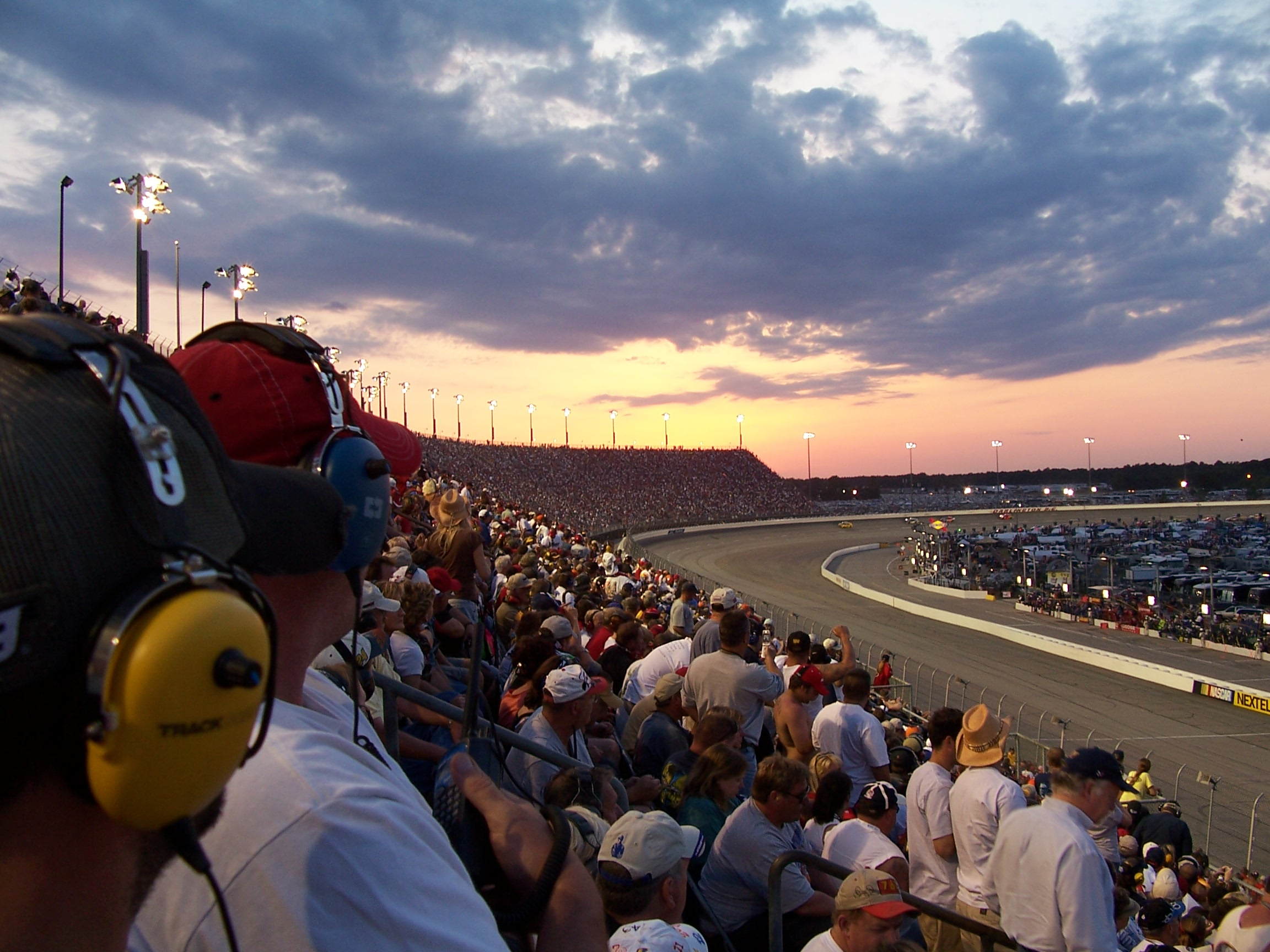
Darlington Raceway, the track where the race was held.

Darlington Raceway is a race track built for NASCAR racing located near Darlington, South Carolina. It is nicknamed "The Lady in Black" and "The Track Too Tough to Tame" by many NASCAR fans and drivers and advertised as "A NASCAR Tradition." It is of a unique, somewhat egg-shaped design, an oval with the ends of very different configurations, a condition which supposedly arose from the proximity of one end of the track to a minnow pond the owner refused to relocate. This situation makes it very challenging for the crews to set up their cars' handling in a way that is effective at both ends.

=== Surface issues ===
Darlington Raceway was last repaved following the May 2007 meeting (from 2005 to 2019, there was only one meeting; the second meeting was reinstated in 2020), and from 2008 to 2019, there was one night race. In 2020, a day race returned to the schedule, and instead of two races (one Xfinity and one Cup) during the entire year, the track hosted six races (three Cup, two Xfinity, and one Truck). The circuit kept repairing the circuit with patches during each summer before the annual Cup race in September. The circuit's narrow Turn 2 rapidly deteriorated with cracks in the tarmac allowing water to seep in the circuit. In July 2021, the circuit repaved a six hundred foot section at the entrance of Turn 2 and ending at the exit of the turn to repair the tarmac and resolve the issue for safety and to reduce the threat of weepers and surface issues in that section of the circuit.

==== Entry list ====
- (R) denotes rookie driver.
- (i) denotes driver who is ineligible for series driver points.

| # | Driver | Team | Make | Throwback |
|---|---|---|---|---|
| 00 | Sheldon Creed | Haas Factory Team | Ford | |
| 1 | Carson Kvapil (R) | JR Motorsports | Chevrolet | Jamie McMurray's paint scheme that won him the 2010 Daytona 500. |
| 2 | Jesse Love | Richard Childress Racing | Chevrolet | |
| 4 | Parker Retzlaff | Alpha Prime Racing | Chevrolet | Ernie Irvan's No. 4 Kodak paint scheme from the early 1990s. |
| 5 | Kris Wright | Our Motorsports | Chevrolet | |
| 07 | Nick Leitz | SS-Green Light Racing | Chevrolet | Scott Riggs' No. 10 Valvoline paint scheme that ran in the 2006 and 2007 seasons. |
| 7 | Justin Allgaier | JR Motorsports | Chevrolet | 1949 Heritage retro scheme. |
| 8 | Sammy Smith | JR Motorsports | Chevrolet | Tony Stewart's 3 Doors Down paint scheme that raced in the 2003 Cabela's 250. |
| 9 | Ross Chastain (i) | JR Motorsports | Chevrolet | |
| 10 | Daniel Dye (R) | Kaulig Racing | Chevrolet | Adam Petty's No. 45 Spree paint scheme that raced in 1999. |
| 11 | Josh Williams | Kaulig Racing | Chevrolet | Mark Martin's No. 01 U.S. Army paint scheme that raced in the 2007 season. |
| 14 | Garrett Smithley | SS-Green Light Racing | Chevrolet | Terry Labonte's MW Windows Busch Series paint scheme that ran in the 1993-1995 seasons. |
| 16 | Christian Eckes (R) | Kaulig Racing | Chevrolet | |
| 17 | Chase Elliott (i) | Hendrick Motorsports | Chevrolet | |
| 18 | William Sawalich (R) | Joe Gibbs Racing | Toyota | Kyle Busch's NOS Energy Drink paint scheme that won 10 races in 2016. |
| 19 | Christopher Bell (i) | Joe Gibbs Racing | Toyota | Honoring Bell's racing mentor, Rick Ferkel, representing his well-known car design. |
| 20 | Brandon Jones | Joe Gibbs Racing | Toyota | Matt Kenseth's Dollar General paint scheme that ran in the 2013 and 2014 seasons. |
| 21 | Austin Hill | Richard Childress Racing | Chevrolet | |
| 25 | Harrison Burton | AM Racing | Ford | Jeff Burton's No. 99 Citgo paint scheme that ran in the 2001 season. |
| 26 | Dean Thompson (R) | Sam Hunt Racing | Toyota | Jamie McMurray's Irwin Tools paint scheme that won him the 2009 AMP Energy 500. |
| 27 | Jeb Burton | Jordan Anderson Racing | Chevrolet | Ward Burton's No. 31 Hardee's paint scheme that ran in the 1994 and 1995 seasons. |
| 28 | Kyle Sieg | RSS Racing | Ford | Ricky Rudd's No. 28 Havoline paint scheme that raced to his final Cup Series win at the 2002 Dodge/Save Mart 350. |
| 31 | Blaine Perkins | Jordan Anderson Racing | Chevrolet | |
| 32 | Austin Green | Jordan Anderson Racing | Chevrolet | |
| 35 | Greg Van Alst | Joey Gase Motorsports | Chevrolet | Ryan Reed's No. 16 Lilly Diabetes paint scheme that won him the 2015 Alert Today Florida 300. |
| 39 | Ryan Sieg | RSS Racing | Ford | Dale Jarrett's No. 88 Ford Credit reverse paint scheme that raced in the 1999 The Winston. |
| 41 | Sam Mayer | Haas Factory Team | Ford | Kurt Busch's Haas Automation paint scheme that won him the 2017 Daytona 500. |
| 42 | Anthony Alfredo | Young's Motorsports | Chevrolet | Sterling Marlin's No. 40 Coors Light paint scheme that ran in the 2005 season. |
| 44 | Brennan Poole | Alpha Prime Racing | Chevrolet | Jeff Gordon's No. 24 DuPont/Looney Tunes paint scheme that raced in the 2001 Chevrolet Monte Carlo 400. |
| 45 | Mason Massey | Alpha Prime Racing | Chevrolet | Jimmy Spencer's No. 23 No Bull 5 paint scheme that ran in the 1998 season. |
| 48 | Nick Sanchez (R) | Big Machine Racing | Chevrolet | Bobby Unser's Jorgensen Eagle paint scheme that won him the 1975 Indianapolis 500. |
| 51 | Jeremy Clements | Jeremy Clements Racing | Chevrolet | Harry Gant's No. 33 Skoal Bandit paint scheme that raced in the 1985 season. |
| 53 | David Starr | Joey Gase Motorsports | Chevrolet | |
| 54 | Taylor Gray (R) | Joe Gibbs Racing | Toyota | |
| 70 | Leland Honeyman | Cope Family Racing | Chevrolet | Jeff Green's No. 10 Nesquik paint scheme that raced in the 2000 season. |
| 71 | Ryan Ellis | DGM Racing | Chevrolet | Ellis' U.S. Legend Car paint scheme that raced in 2001. |
| 74 | Dawson Cram | Mike Harmon Racing | Chevrolet | |
| 88 | Connor Zilisch (R) | JR Motorsports | Chevrolet | Buddy Baker's Crisco paint scheme that raced in the 1987 season. |
| 91 | Josh Bilicki | DGM Racing | Chevrolet | |
| 99 | Matt DiBenedetto | Viking Motorsports | Chevrolet | Jeff Burton's No. 99 Exide paint scheme that ran in the 2000 season. |
Official entry list

== Practice ==
For practice, drivers will be separated into two groups, A and B. Both sessions were 25 minutes long, and was held on Saturday, April 5, at 10:05 AM EST. Nick Sanchez, driving for Big Machine Racing, would set the fastest time between both sessions, with a lap of 29.859, and a speed of 164.694 mph (265.049 km/h).

| Pos. | # | Driver | Team | Make | Time | Speed |
|---|---|---|---|---|---|---|
| 1 | 48 | Nick Sanchez (R) | Big Machine Racing | Chevrolet | 29.859 | 164.694 |
| 2 | 16 | Christian Eckes (R) | Kaulig Racing | Chevrolet | 29.995 | 163.947 |
| 3 | 2 | Jesse Love | Richard Childress Racing | Chevrolet | 30.043 | 163.685 |
Full practice results

== Qualifying ==
Qualifying was held on Saturday, April 5, at 11:10 AM EST. Since Darlington Raceway is an intermediate racetrack, the qualifying procedure used is a single-car, one-lap system with one round. Drivers will be on track by themselves and will have one lap to post a qualifying time, and whoever sets the fastest time will win the pole.

Christopher Bell, driving for Joe Gibbs Racing, would score the pole for the race, with a lap of 29.911, and a speed of 164.408 mph (264.589 km/h).

Two drivers failed to qualify: Dawson Cram and Austin Green.

=== Qualifying results ===
| Pos. | # | Driver | Team | Make | Time | Speed |
|---|---|---|---|---|---|---|
| 1 | 19 | Christopher Bell (i) | Joe Gibbs Racing | Toyota | 29.911 | 164.408 |
| 2 | 20 | Brandon Jones | Joe Gibbs Racing | Toyota | 29.915 | 164.386 |
| 3 | 7 | Justin Allgaier | JR Motorsports | Chevrolet | 29.945 | 164.221 |
| 4 | 54 | Taylor Gray (R) | Joe Gibbs Racing | Toyota | 30.008 | 163.876 |
| 5 | 41 | Sam Mayer | Haas Factory Team | Ford | 30.040 | 163.702 |
| 6 | 1 | Carson Kvapil (R) | JR Motorsports | Chevrolet | 30.054 | 163.625 |
| 7 | 10 | Daniel Dye (R) | Kaulig Racing | Chevrolet | 30.093 | 163.413 |
| 8 | 17 | Chase Elliott (i) | Hendrick Motorsports | Chevrolet | 30.096 | 163.397 |
| 9 | 16 | Christian Eckes (R) | Kaulig Racing | Chevrolet | 30.196 | 162.856 |
| 10 | 00 | Sheldon Creed | Haas Factory Team | Ford | 30.213 | 162.764 |
| 11 | 2 | Jesse Love | Richard Childress Racing | Chevrolet | 30.218 | 162.737 |
| 12 | 8 | Sammy Smith | JR Motorsports | Chevrolet | 30.238 | 162.630 |
| 13 | 5 | Kris Wright | Our Motorsports | Chevrolet | 30.266 | 162.479 |
| 14 | 25 | Harrison Burton | AM Racing | Ford | 30.269 | 162.463 |
| 15 | 48 | Nick Sanchez (R) | Big Machine Racing | Chevrolet | 30.283 | 162.388 |
| 16 | 88 | Connor Zilisch (R) | JR Motorsports | Chevrolet | 30.302 | 162.286 |
| 17 | 39 | Ryan Sieg | RSS Racing | Ford | 30.312 | 162.233 |
| 18 | 51 | Jeremy Clements | Jeremy Clements Racing | Chevrolet | 30.376 | 161.891 |
| 19 | 21 | Austin Hill | Richard Childress Racing | Chevrolet | 30.392 | 161.806 |
| 20 | 18 | William Sawalich (R) | Joe Gibbs Racing | Toyota | 30.421 | 161.651 |
| 21 | 99 | Matt DiBenedetto | Viking Motorsports | Chevrolet | 30.430 | 161.604 |
| 22 | 27 | Jeb Burton | Jordan Anderson Racing | Chevrolet | 30.434 | 161.582 |
| 23 | 44 | Brennan Poole | Alpha Prime Racing | Chevrolet | 30.462 | 161.434 |
| 24 | 31 | Blaine Perkins | Jordan Anderson Racing | Chevrolet | 30.470 | 161.392 |
| 25 | 71 | Ryan Ellis | DGM Racing | Chevrolet | 30.494 | 161.265 |
| 26 | 4 | Parker Retzlaff | Alpha Prime Racing | Chevrolet | 30.529 | 161.080 |
| 27 | 9 | Ross Chastain (i) | JR Motorsports | Chevrolet | 30.603 | 160.690 |
| 28 | 14 | Garrett Smithley | SS-Green Light Racing | Chevrolet | 30.659 | 160.397 |
| 29 | 11 | Josh Williams | Kaulig Racing | Chevrolet | 30.696 | 160.203 |
| 30 | 26 | Dean Thompson (R) | Sam Hunt Racing | Toyota | 30.715 | 160.104 |
| 31 | 91 | Josh Bilicki | DGM Racing | Chevrolet | 30.725 | 160.052 |
| 32 | 42 | Anthony Alfredo | Young's Motorsports | Chevrolet | 30.847 | 159.419 |
Qualified by owner's points
| 33 | 70 | Leland Honeyman | Cope Family Racing | Chevrolet | 30.939 | 158.945 |
| 34 | 28 | Kyle Sieg | RSS Racing | Ford | 30.997 | 158.648 |
| 35 | 45 | Mason Massey | Alpha Prime Racing | Chevrolet | 31.035 | 158.453 |
| 36 | 07 | Nick Leitz | SS-Green Light Racing | Chevrolet | 31.084 | 158.204 |
| 37 | 53 | David Starr | Joey Gase Motorsports | Chevrolet | 31.289 | 157.167 |
| 38 | 35 | Greg Van Alst | Joey Gase Motorsports | Chevrolet | – | – |
Failed to qualify
| 39 | 74 | Dawson Cram | Mike Harmon Racing | Chevrolet | 31.211 | 157.560 |
| 40 | 32 | Austin Green | Jordan Anderson Racing | Chevrolet | 31.265 | 157.288 |
Official qualifying results
Official starting lineup

== Race results ==
Stage 1 Laps: 45

| Pos. | # | Driver | Team | Make | Pts |
|---|---|---|---|---|---|
| 1 | 25 | Harrison Burton | AM Racing | Ford | 10 |
| 2 | 7 | Justin Allgaier | JR Motorsports | Chevrolet | 9 |
| 3 | 44 | Brennan Poole | Alpha Prime Racing | Chevrolet | 8 |
| 4 | 28 | Kyle Sieg | RSS Racing | Ford | 7 |
| 5 | 42 | Anthony Alfredo | Young's Motorsports | Chevrolet | 6 |
| 6 | 20 | Brandon Jones | Joe Gibbs Racing | Toyota | 5 |
| 7 | 16 | Christian Eckes (R) | Kaulig Racing | Chevrolet | 4 |
| 8 | 91 | Josh Bilicki | DGM Racing | Chevrolet | 3 |
| 9 | 9 | Ross Chastain (i) | JR Motorsports | Chevrolet | 0 |
| 10 | 00 | Sheldon Creed | Haas Factory Team | Ford | 1 |

Stage 2 Laps: 45

| Pos. | # | Driver | Team | Make | Pts |
|---|---|---|---|---|---|
| 1 | 7 | Justin Allgaier | JR Motorsports | Chevrolet | 10 |
| 2 | 16 | Christian Eckes (R) | Kaulig Racing | Chevrolet | 9 |
| 3 | 9 | Ross Chastain (i) | JR Motorsports | Chevrolet | 0 |
| 4 | 20 | Brandon Jones | Joe Gibbs Racing | Toyota | 7 |
| 5 | 25 | Harrison Burton | AM Racing | Ford | 6 |
| 6 | 1 | Carson Kvapil (R) | JR Motorsports | Chevrolet | 5 |
| 7 | 19 | Christopher Bell (i) | Joe Gibbs Racing | Toyota | 0 |
| 8 | 17 | Chase Elliott (i) | Hendrick Motorsports | Chevrolet | 0 |
| 9 | 2 | Jesse Love | Richard Childress Racing | Chevrolet | 2 |
| 10 | 00 | Sheldon Creed | Haas Factory Team | Ford | 1 |

Stage 3 Laps: 58

| Fin | St | # | Driver | Team | Make | Laps | Led | Status | Pts |
|---|---|---|---|---|---|---|---|---|---|
| 1 | 2 | 20 | Brandon Jones | Joe Gibbs Racing | Toyota | 147 | 24 | Running | 52 |
| 2 | 8 | 17 | Chase Elliott (i) | Hendrick Motorsports | Chevrolet | 147 | 0 | Running | 0 |
| 3 | 3 | 7 | Justin Allgaier | JR Motorsports | Chevrolet | 147 | 56 | Running | 53 |
| 4 | 27 | 9 | Ross Chastain (i) | JR Motorsports | Chevrolet | 147 | 21 | Running | 0 |
| 5 | 6 | 1 | Carson Kvapil (R) | JR Motorsports | Chevrolet | 147 | 0 | Running | 37 |
| 6 | 16 | 88 | Connor Zilisch (R) | JR Motorsports | Chevrolet | 147 | 0 | Running | 31 |
| 7 | 9 | 16 | Christian Eckes (R) | Kaulig Racing | Chevrolet | 147 | 1 | Running | 43 |
| 8 | 15 | 48 | Nick Sanchez (R) | Big Machine Racing | Chevrolet | 147 | 0 | Running | 29 |
| 9 | 12 | 8 | Sammy Smith | JR Motorsports | Chevrolet | 147 | 0 | Running | 28 |
| 10 | 10 | 00 | Sheldon Creed | Haas Factory Team | Ford | 147 | 0 | Running | 29 |
| 11 | 11 | 2 | Jesse Love | Richard Childress Racing | Chevrolet | 147 | 0 | Running | 28 |
| 12 | 17 | 39 | Ryan Sieg | RSS Racing | Ford | 147 | 0 | Running | 25 |
| 13 | 14 | 25 | Harrison Burton | AM Racing | Ford | 147 | 12 | Running | 40 |
| 14 | 5 | 41 | Sam Mayer | Haas Factory Team | Ford | 147 | 0 | Running | 23 |
| 15 | 22 | 27 | Jeb Burton | Jordan Anderson Racing | Chevrolet | 147 | 0 | Running | 22 |
| 16 | 19 | 21 | Austin Hill | Richard Childress Racing | Chevrolet | 147 | 0 | Running | 21 |
| 17 | 7 | 10 | Daniel Dye (R) | Kaulig Racing | Chevrolet | 147 | 0 | Running | 20 |
| 18 | 30 | 26 | Dean Thompson (R) | Sam Hunt Racing | Toyota | 147 | 0 | Running | 19 |
| 19 | 23 | 44 | Brennan Poole | Alpha Prime Racing | Chevrolet | 147 | 4 | Running | 26 |
| 20 | 26 | 4 | Parker Retzlaff | Alpha Prime Racing | Chevrolet | 147 | 0 | Running | 17 |
| 21 | 18 | 51 | Jeremy Clements | Jeremy Clements Racing | Chevrolet | 147 | 0 | Running | 16 |
| 22 | 25 | 71 | Ryan Ellis | DGM Racing | Chevrolet | 147 | 0 | Running | 15 |
| 23 | 21 | 99 | Matt DiBenedetto | Viking Motorsports | Chevrolet | 147 | 0 | Running | 14 |
| 24 | 31 | 91 | Josh Bilicki | DGM Racing | Chevrolet | 147 | 0 | Running | 16 |
| 25 | 1 | 19 | Christopher Bell (i) | Joe Gibbs Racing | Toyota | 147 | 27 | Running | 0 |
| 26 | 37 | 53 | David Starr | Joey Gase Motorsports | Chevrolet | 147 | 1 | Running | 11 |
| 27 | 36 | 07 | Nick Leitz | SS-Green Light Racing | Chevrolet | 147 | 0 | Running | 10 |
| 28 | 24 | 31 | Blaine Perkins | Jordan Anderson Racing | Chevrolet | 147 | 0 | Running | 9 |
| 29 | 35 | 45 | Mason Massey | Alpha Prime Racing | Chevrolet | 147 | 0 | Running | 8 |
| 30 | 34 | 28 | Kyle Sieg | RSS Racing | Ford | 147 | 1 | Running | 14 |
| 31 | 32 | 42 | Anthony Alfredo | Young's Motorsports | Chevrolet | 147 | 0 | Running | 12 |
| 32 | 28 | 14 | Garrett Smithley | SS-Green Light Racing | Chevrolet | 147 | 0 | Running | 5 |
| 33 | 4 | 54 | Taylor Gray (R) | Joe Gibbs Racing | Toyota | 147 | 0 | Running | 4 |
| 34 | 38 | 35 | Greg Van Alst | Joey Gase Motorsports | Chevrolet | 146 | 0 | Running | 3 |
| 35 | 20 | 18 | William Sawalich (R) | Joe Gibbs Racing | Toyota | 139 | 0 | Running | 2 |
| 36 | 29 | 11 | Josh Williams | Kaulig Racing | Chevrolet | 137 | 0 | Overheating | 1 |
| 37 | 33 | 70 | Leland Honeyman | Cope Family Racing | Chevrolet | 128 | 0 | Accident | 1 |
| 38 | 13 | 5 | Kris Wright | Our Motorsports | Chevrolet | 27 | 0 | Suspension | 1 |
Official race results

== Standings after the race ==
Drivers' Championship standings

| | Pos | Driver | Points |
|---|---|---|---|
| | 1 | Justin Allgaier | 346 |
| | 2 | Sam Mayer | 275 (–71) |
| | 3 | Austin Hill | 267 (–79) |
| | 4 | Sheldon Creed | 251 (–95) |
| | 5 | Jesse Love | 247 (–99) |
| | 6 | Connor Zilisch | 224 (–122) |
| 7 | 7 | Brandon Jones | 216 (–130) |
| 1 | 8 | Carson Kvapil | 213 (–133) |
| 1 | 9 | Ryan Sieg | 210 (–136) |
| 5 | 10 | Harrison Burton | 198 (–148) |
| 2 | 11 | Sammy Smith | 193 (–153) |
| 2 | 12 | Jeb Burton | 191 (–155) |
Official driver's standings

Manufacturers' Championship standings

| Pos | Manufacturer | Points |
|---|---|---|
| 1 | Chevrolet | 310 |
| 2 | Toyota | 272 (–38) |
| 3 | Ford | 258 (–52) |

- Note: Only the first 12 positions are included for the driver standings.

| Previous race: 2025 US Marine Corps 250 | NASCAR Xfinity Series; 2025 season | Next race: 2025 SciAps 300 |
