= First Choice =

First Choice may refer to:

- First Choice (group), an American vocal trio, active 1971–1984
- First Choice Emergency Room, a healthcare company based in Flower Mound, Texas
- First Choice Liquor, an Australian retailer
- First Choice (travel firm), travel firm owned by TUI Group
  - First Choice Airways, its former in-house airline
- First Choice Haircutters, a Canadian hairdressing company
- Crave, a pay TV service in Canada, known simply as "First Choice" 1983–84 and 1989–93
  - First Choice Superchannel, a service jointly operated with Superchannel (Movie Central) from 1984 to 1989
- Pfs:First Choice, a 1980s word processing program
