= Dan Hanrahan =

- Born: Daniel J. Hanrahan; 1957 or 1958 (age 68–69)
- Citizenship: American
- Education: University of Wisconsin
- Occupation: businessman
- Title: Former chairman and CEO, Regis Corporation
- Term: August 2012 - April 2017
- Successor: Hugh E. Sawyer

Daniel J. Hanrahan (born 1957/58) is an American businessman. He was the chairman and CEO of Regis Corporation, the largest hair salon chain in the world, with over 10,000 salons (company-owned and franchises), from August 2012 to April 2017.

Hanrahan has a bachelor's degree in Business Administration from the University of Wisconsin.

Hanrahan was CEO and president of Regis between August 2012 and April 2017, prior to which he was CEO of Celebrity Cruises. Before that, he worked for Reebok, Nestle Foods and the E & J Gallo Winery.

In April 2017, it was announced that Hanrahan had left Regis and been succeeded by Hugh E. Sawyer as president and CEO, having previously been a managing director for the Chicago-based Huron Consulting Group, a management consulting firm.
