= NASCAR O'Reilly Auto Parts Series at Darlington Raceway =

NASCAR O'Reilly Auto Parts Series races at Darlington Raceway

NASCAR O'Reilly Auto Parts Series
- Venue: Darlington Raceway
- Location: Darlington, South Carolina, U.S.

Circuit information
- Surface: Asphalt
- Length: 1.366 mi (2.198 km)
- Turns: 4

Stock car racing events in the NASCAR O'Reilly Auto Parts Series has been held at Darlington Raceway in Darlington, South Carolina since the series' inaugural season in 1982.

Initially only one race was held, but starting in 1984 the track hosted two races per year until 2004 when the track lost its fall weekend date as a result of the realignments caused by the Ferko lawsuit. A realignment in 2015 moved the spring race to the pre-Ferko fall slot. The emergency schedule realignment for 2020 resulted in Darlington regaining its second Xfinity date, which became permanent starting from 2021, except in 2025.

== Spring race ==
Sport Clips Haircuts VFW 200
- Corporate sponsor: Sport Clips and the VFW
- First race: 1982
- Distance: 249.978 miles (402.301 km)
- Laps: 183; Stages 1/2: 45 each Final stage: 93
- Previous names: TranSouth 200 (1982); Dixie Cup 200 (1984–1986); Country Squire 200 (1987–1989); Pontiac 200 (1990-1991); Mark III Vans 200 (1992–1995); Dura Lube 200 (1996); SunCom 200 (2000–2001) darlingtonraceway.com 200 (2002–2003); Diamond Hill Plywood 200 (1997–1999, 2004–2009); Royal Purple 200 (2010–2011); VFW Sport Clips Help a Hero 200 (2012–2014); Toyota 200 (2020); Steakhouse Elite 200 (2021); Mahindra ROXOR 200 (2022); Shriners Children's 200 (2023); Crown Royal Purple Bag Project 200 (2024)
- Most wins (driver): Mark Martin (5)
- Most wins (team): Joe Gibbs Racing (9)
- Most wins (manufacturer): Chevrolet (16)

The Sport Clips Haircuts VFW 200 is a NASCAR O'Reilly Auto Parts Series race at Darlington Raceway in Darlington, South Carolina that has been held since 1982. The race is held on the weekend of the NASCAR Cup Series' Goodyear 400. Justin Allgaier is the defending race winner.

=== History ===
First held in 1982, the race has been held every year, except in 1983. From 2015 NASCAR Xfinity Series—2019, the race was temporarily taken off the schedule. The race has been held around Springtime to align with the Cup Series' race weekend. Sport Clips and the VFW assumed sponsor rights for the race from 2012–2014 and returned in 2025. Crown Royal sponsored the race in 2024.

The race length was increased from 200 miles to 250 miles for 2027, becoming 183 laps for the first time in series history.

=== Past winners ===
Year	Date	No.	Driver	Team	Manufacturer	Race Distance		Race Time	Average Speed (mph)	Report	Ref
Year	Date	No.	Driver	Team	Manufacturer	Laps	Miles (km)	Race Time	Average Speed (mph)	Report	Ref
1982	April 3	99	Geoff Bodine	Frank Plessinger	Pontiac	147	200.802 (323.159)	1:33:23	129.018	Report	
1983	Not held										
1984	April 14	47	Ron Bouchard	Race Hill Farm Team	Pontiac	147	200.802 (323.159)	2:04:55	97.992	Report	
1985	April 13	11	Jack Ingram	Jack Ingram Racing	Oldsmobile	147	200.802 (323.159)	1:51:05	108.46	Report	
1986	April 12	17	Darrell Waltrip	DarWal, Inc.	Pontiac	147	200.802 (323.159)	1:37:37	123.423	Report	
1987	March 28	8	Dale Earnhardt	Dale Earnhardt, Inc.	Chevrolet	147	200.802 (323.159)	1:27:24	137.85	Report	
1988	March 26	15	Geoff Bodine	Hendrick Motorsports	Chevrolet	147	200.802 (323.159)	1:44:18	115.514	Report	
1989	April 1	15	Geoff Bodine	Hendrick Motorsports	Chevrolet	147	200.802 (323.159)	1:41:31	118.681	Report	
1990	March 31	7	Harry Gant	Whitaker Racing	Buick	147	200.802 (323.159)	1:32:54	129.689	Report	
1991	April 6	32	Dale Jarrett	Dale Jarrett	Pontiac	147	200.802 (323.159)	1:44:16	115.551	Report	
1992	March 28	59	Robert Pressley	Alliance Motorsports	Oldsmobile	147	200.802 (323.159)	1:31:59	130.982	Report	
1993	March 27	59	Robert Pressley	Alliance Motorsports	Chevrolet	147	200.802 (323.159)	1:50:20	109.197	Report	
1994	March 26	60	Mark Martin	Roush Racing	Ford	147	200.802 (323.159)	1:42:08	117.965	Report	
1995	March 25	92	Larry Pearson	Martin Motorsports	Chevrolet	147	200.802 (323.159)	1:51:28	108.087	Report	
1996	March 23	60	Mark Martin	Roush Racing	Ford	147	200.802 (323.159)	1:39:46	120.763	Report	
1997	March 22	74	Randy LaJoie	BACE Motorsports	Chevrolet	147	200.802 (323.159)	1:44:15	115.569	Report	
1998	March 21	44	Bobby Labonte	Joe Gibbs Racing	Pontiac	147	200.802 (323.159)	1:59:57	100.443	Report	
1999	March 20	17	Matt Kenseth	Reiser Enterprises	Chevrolet	147	200.802 (323.159)	1:38:48	121.945	Report	
2000	March 18	60	Mark Martin	Roush Racing	Ford	147	200.802 (323.159)	1:46:08	113.519	Report	
2001	March 17	10	Jeff Green	ppc Racing	Ford	147	200.802 (323.159)	1:33:35	128.742	Report	
2002	March 16	9	Jeff Burton*	Roush Racing	Ford	147	200.802 (323.159)	1:37:03	124.143	Report	
2003	March 17*	92	Todd Bodine	Herzog Motorsports	Chevrolet	147	200.802 (323.159)	1:36:44	124.55	Report	
2004	March 20	60	Greg Biffle	Roush Racing	Ford	147	200.802 (323.159)	1:40:17	120.141	Report	
2005	May 6	17	Matt Kenseth	Roush Racing	Ford	147	200.802 (323.159)	1:43:39	116.238	Report	
2006	May 12	20	Denny Hamlin	Joe Gibbs Racing	Chevrolet	147	200.802 (323.159)	1:52:36	106.999	Report	
2007	May 11	20	Denny Hamlin	Joe Gibbs Racing	Chevrolet	147	200.802 (323.159)	2:10:26	92.37	Report	
2008	May 9	20	Tony Stewart	Joe Gibbs Racing	Toyota	149*	203.534 (327.556)	1:53:59	107.139	Report	
2009	May 8	16	Matt Kenseth	Roush Fenway Racing	Ford	153*	208.998 (336.349)	1:47:33	116.596	Report	
2010	May 7	20	Denny Hamlin	Joe Gibbs Racing	Toyota	147	200.802 (323.159)	1:56:50	103.122	Report	
2011	May 6	18	Kyle Busch	Joe Gibbs Racing	Toyota	147	200.802 (323.159)	1:40:56	119.364	Report	
2012	May 11	20	Joey Logano	Joe Gibbs Racing	Toyota	151*	206.266 (331.952)	1:50:29	112.017	Report	
2013	May 10	54	Kyle Busch	Joe Gibbs Racing	Toyota	147	200.802 (323.159)	1:32:06	130.816	Report	
2014	April 11	9	Chase Elliott	JR Motorsports	Chevrolet	147	200.802 (323.159)	1:45:55	113.751	Report	
2015 – 2019	Not held										
2020	May 21*	98	Chase Briscoe	Stewart–Haas Racing	Ford	147	200.802 (323.159)	1:44:26	115.367	Report	
2021	May 8	7	Justin Allgaier	JR Motorsports	Chevrolet	148*	202.168 (325.357)	2:02:51	98.739	Report	
2022	May 7	7	Justin Allgaier	JR Motorsports	Chevrolet	147	200.802 (323.159)	1:51:59	107.589	Report	
2023	May 13	10	Kyle Larson	Kaulig Racing	Chevrolet	147	200.802 (323.159)	2:11:04	91.924	Report	
2024	May 11	7	Justin Allgaier	JR Motorsports	Chevrolet	147	200.802 (323.159)	1:48:58	110.567	Report	
2025	April 5	20	Brandon Jones	Joe Gibbs Racing	Toyota	147	200.802 (323.159)	1:54:57	104.812	Report	
2026	March 21	7	Justin Allgaier	JR Motorsports	Chevrolet	147	200.802 (323.159)	1:47:09	112.442	Report	
2027	April 3									Report	

- 2003: Race postponed from Saturday to Monday due to rain.
- 2008, 2009, 2012, 2021: Races extended due to NASCAR overtime.
- 2020: Race added due to the COVID-19 pandemic schedule changes; postponed from Tuesday to Thursday due to rain.

==== Multiple winners (drivers) ====
# Wins	Driver	Years won
5	Mark Martin	1993–1995, 1999, 2000
4	Justin Allgaier	2021, 2022, 2024, 2026
3	Denny Hamlin	2006, 2007, 2010
3	Geoff Bodine	1982, 1988, 1989
3	Matt Kenseth	1999, 2005, 2009
2	Robert Pressley	1992, 1993
2	Kyle Busch	2011, 2013

==== Multiple winners (teams) ====
# Wins	Team	Years won
9	Joe Gibbs Racing	1998, 2006–2008, 2010–2013, 2025
7	Roush Fenway Racing	1994, 1996, 2000, 2002, 2004, 2005, 2009
5	JR Motorsports	2014, 2021, 2022, 2024, 2026
2	Hendrick Motorsports	1988, 1989
2	Alliance Motorsports	1992, 1993

==== Manufacturer wins ====
# Wins	Manufacturer	Years won
16	(United States) Chevrolet	1987–1989, 1993, 1995, 1997, 1999, 2003, 2006, 2007, 2014, 2021–2024, 2026
9	(United States) Ford	1994, 1996, 2000–2002, 2004, 2005, 2009, 2020
5	(United States) Pontiac	1982, 1984, 1986, 1991, 1998
5	(Japan) Toyota	2008, 2010–2013, 2025
2	(United States) Oldsmobile	1985, 1992
1	(United States) Buick	1990

== Fall race ==
Fleetio 200
- Corporate sponsor: Fleetio
- First race: 1983
- Distance: 200.802 miles (323.159 km)
- Laps: 147; Stages 1/2: 45 each Final stage: 57
- Previous names: Darlington 250 (1983); Darlington 200 (1984); Pontiac Winners' Circle 200 (1985); Gatorade 200 (1986–1995, 2002); Dura-Lube 200 Presented by BI-LO (1998); Dura Lube 200 (1996–1997, 1999-2000); South Carolina 200 (2001); Winn-Dixie 200 Presented by PepsiCo (2003); BI-LO 200 (2004); VFW Sport Clips Help a Hero 200 (2015–2016); Sport Clips Haircuts VFW 200 (2017–2024)
- Most wins (team): Roush Fenway Racing (8)
- Most wins (manufacturer): Ford (11)

The Fleetio 200 has been held on occasion since 1983. The race is held on the weekend of the NASCAR Cup Series' Southern 500. Sheldon Creed is the defending winner of the event in 2026.

=== History ===
The original running of this race was held in 1983 as a 250 miles (400 km) race in order to meet South Carolina's blue laws, since the Southern 500 was held on Monday, that required race distances to be scheduled for at least 250 miles (184 laps). The race was sponsored by Sport Clips and the VFW (after sponsoring the spring race) from 2015–2024, under different names. In 2025, the race was taken off the schedule before being added on for 2026, with Fleetio taking the sponsorship rights.

=== Past winners ===
Year	Date	No.	Driver	Team	Manufacturer	Race Distance		Race Time	Average Speed (mph)	Report	Ref
Year	Date	No.	Driver	Team	Manufacturer	Laps	Miles (km)	Race Time	Average Speed (mph)	Report	Ref
1983	September 4	75	Neil Bonnett	Butch Mock	Pontiac	183	249.978 (402.3)	1:54:14	131.299	Report	
1984	September 1	47	Ron Bouchard	Race Hill Farm Team	Pontiac	147	200.802 (323.159)	1:50:25	109.115	Report	
1985	August 31	17	Darrell Waltrip	DarWal, Inc.	Chevrolet	147	200.802 (323.159)	1:43:20	116.595	Report	
1986	September 1	8	Dale Earnhardt	Dale Earnhardt, Inc.	Pontiac	147	200.802 (323.159)	2:06:02	95.468	Report	
1987	September 5	7	Harry Gant	Whitaker Racing	Buick	147	200.802 (323.159)	1:56:45	103.196	Report	
1988	September 3	7	Harry Gant	Whitaker Racing	Buick	147	200.802 (323.159)	1:28:35	136.009	Report	
1989	September 2	7	Harry Gant	Whitaker Racing	Buick	147	200.802 (323.159)	1:41:06	119.17	Report	
1990	September 1	32	Dale Jarrett	Horace Isenhower	Pontiac	147	200.802 (323.159)	1:28:22	136.342	Report	
1991	August 31	3	Dale Earnhardt	Dale Earnhardt, Inc.	Chevrolet	147	200.802 (323.159)	1:29:49	134.141	Report	
1992	September 5	30	Michael Waltrip	Bahari Racing	Pontiac	147	200.802 (323.159)	1:27:13	138.14	Report	
1993	September 4	60	Mark Martin	Roush Racing	Ford	147	200.802 (323.159)	1:42:25	117.638	Report	
1994	September 3	60	Mark Martin	Roush Racing	Ford	111*	151.626 (244.018)	1:12:53	124.824	Report	
1995	September 2	60	Mark Martin	Roush Racing	Ford	147	200.802 (323.159)	1:44:36	115.183	Report	
1996	August 31	5	Terry Labonte	Labonte Motorsports	Chevrolet	147	200.802 (323.159)	1:33:47	128.468	Report	
1997	August 30	9	Jeff Burton	Roush Racing	Ford	147	200.802 (323.159)	1:42:02	118.08	Report	
1998	September 5	64	Dick Trickle	Shoemaker Racing	Chevrolet	147	200.802 (323.159)	1:37:46	123.233	Report	
1999	September 4	60	Mark Martin	Roush Racing	Ford	147	200.802 (323.159)	1:31:07	132.227	Report	
2000	September 2	60	Mark Martin	Roush Racing	Ford	147	200.802 (323.159)	1:41:55	118.215	Report	
2001	September 1	9	Jeff Burton	Roush Racing	Ford	147	200.802 (323.159)	1:57:34	102.479	Report	
2002	August 31	9	Jeff Burton	Roush Racing	Ford	74*	101.084 (162.678)	1:05:33	92.525	Report	
2003	August 30	5	Brian Vickers	Hendrick Motorsports	Chevrolet	147	200.802 (323.159)	1:45:00	114.744	Report	
2004	November 13	66	Jamie McMurray	Rusty Wallace Racing	Dodge	147	200.802 (323.159)	1:49:49	109.711	Report	
2005 – 2014	Not held										
2015	September 5	20	Denny Hamlin	Joe Gibbs Racing	Toyota	147	200.802 (323.159)	1:25:14	141.355	Report	
2016	September 3	1	Elliott Sadler	JR Motorsports	Chevrolet	147	200.802 (323.159)	1:33:36	128.719	Report	
2017	September 2	18	Denny Hamlin	Joe Gibbs Racing	Toyota	148*	202.168 (325.357)	1:52:03	108.256	Report	
2018	September 1	22	Brad Keselowski	Team Penske	Ford	147	200.802 (323.159)	1:48:22	111.179	Report	
2019*	August 31	00	Cole Custer*	Stewart–Haas Racing	Ford	147	200.802 (323.159)	1:41:08	119.131	Report	
2020	September 5	19	Brandon Jones	Joe Gibbs Racing	Toyota	147	200.802 (323.159)	1:58:32	101.643	Report	
2021	September 4	9	Noah Gragson	JR Motorsports	Chevrolet	152*	207.632 (334.096)	2:01:38	102.422	Report	
2022	September 3	9	Noah Gragson	JR Motorsports	Chevrolet	147	200.802 (323.159)	2:02:58	97.979	Report	
2023	September 2	19	Denny Hamlin	Joe Gibbs Racing	Toyota	148*	202.168 (325.357)	1:53:53	106.826	Report	
2024	August 31	20	Christopher Bell	Joe Gibbs Racing	Toyota	150*	204.9 (329.754)	1:50:49	110.94	Report	
2025	Not held										
2026	September 5	00	Sheldon Creed	Haas Factory Team	Chevrolet	147	200.802 (323.159)	1:58:04	102.045	Report	
2027	September 4									Report	

- 1994 and 2002: Race shortened due to rain.
- 2017, 2021, 2023 and 2024: Races extended due to NASCAR overtime.
- 2019: Cole Custer declared winner after Denny Hamlin was disqualified due to failing inspection.

==== Multiple winners (drivers) ====
# Wins	Driver	Years won
3	Mark Martin	1994, 1996, 2000
3	Denny Hamlin	2015, 2017, 2023
3	Harry Gant	1987–1989
3	Jeff Burton	1997, 2001, 2002
2	Dale Earnhardt	1986, 1991
2	Noah Gragson	2021, 2022

==== Multiple winners (teams) ====
# Wins	Team	Years won
8	Roush Fenway Racing	1993–1995, 1997, 1999–2002
5	Joe Gibbs Racing	2015, 2017, 2020, 2023, 2024
3	JR Motorsports	2016, 2021, 2022
2	Whitaker Racing	1987–1989
2	Dale Earnhardt, Inc.	1986, 1991

==== Manufacturer wins ====
# Wins	Manufacturer	Years won
11	(United States) Ford	1993–1995, 1997, 1999–2002, 2018, 2019
9	(United States) Chevrolet	1985, 1991, 1996, 1998, 2003, 2016, 2021, 2022, 2026
5	(United States) Pontiac	1983, 1984, 1986, 1990, 1992
5	(Japan) Toyota	2015, 2017, 2020, 2023, 2024
3	(United States) Buick	1987–1989
1	(Germany) Dodge	2004

Previous race: The LiUNA!	NASCAR O'Reilly Auto Parts Series; Sport Clips Haircuts VFW 200	Next race: Suburban Propane 300

Previous race: Winn-Dixie 250	NASCAR O'Reilly Auto Parts Series; Fleetio 200	Next race: TBA
