= Hugh E. Sawyer =

American businessman

- Born: 1954 or 1955 (age 69–70)
- Occupation: businessman
- Title: Former CEO of Regis Corporation
- Term: April 2017- September 2020
- Predecessor: Dan Hanrahan
- Successor: Felipe Athayde

Hugh E. Sawyer (born 1954/55) is an American businessman. He is the former CEO of Regis Corporation, the largest hair salon chain in the world, with over 10,000 salons (company-owned and franchises).

In April 2017, it was announced that Dan Hanrahan had left Regis and been succeeded by Sawyer as president and CEO, having previously been a managing director for the Chicago-based Huron Consulting Group Inc, a management consulting firm.

Hugh Sawyer retired from Regis Corporation on October 5, 2020.
