= Olivia Castle =

Final Destination character

- Final Destination character
- Jacqueline MacInnes Wood as Olivia Castle
- First appearance: Final Destination 5 (2011)
- Created by: Jeffrey Reddick
- Portrayed by: Jacqueline MacInnes Wood

In-universe information
- Full name: Olivia Castle
- Gender: Female
- Occupation: Office worker
- Status: Deceased
- Cause of death: Accidental autodefenestration

Olivia Castle is a fictional character from the Final Destination series. She appears in Steven Quale's Final Destination 5 as one of the survivors of the North Bay bridge collapse. She is portrayed by Jacqueline MacInnes Wood and serves as one of the protagonists of the film. The character has gained a large amount of popularity and acclaim, mostly due to Wood's performance and the character's sassy and comedic personality. The character's death scene involving LASIK eye surgery had an influence on viewers, who refused to get the procedure.

== Appearance ==
=== Final Destination 5 ===
Olivia Castle, born on September 13, 1977, is an office worker. She is on her way to a corporate retreat alongside her co-workers when Sam Lawton has a premonition that the bridge they are crossing will collapse; Olivia would have survived her fall into the sea before a car falls and crushes her. She eventually gets off the bus and witnesses the bridge collapse moments later realizing that Sam's premonition was real. A few days later, Olivia meets with the others in their offices, drinking to the memory of the dead, but also seeming nonplussed by the recent death of another survivor, Candice Hooper in a gymnastics accident. Olivia then leaves for a LASIK appointment to improve her myopic vision. Her head is secured and her right eyelid pried open with a speculum. Out of anxiousness, she squeezes a teddy bear, popping off its eye onto the floor. The doctor realizes that he is missing file information and leaves Olivia by herself to talk to his secretary. A cup of water that Olivia left on top of a water cooler is knocked over when the cooler bubbles, and the cup spills onto the power unit of the laser machine plugged into the wall. The intensity of the ray is increased to extreme levels, and the laser machine starts to shake which causes Olivia to become nervous. Olivia reaches for the emergency stop button on the control remote to turn off the machine, but she accidentally knocks it to the floor, where the activation button is pressed, launching the laser that burns her eye and subsequently her hand. When Sam and Molly Harper rush into the front office to save her from danger, and as the doctor assures she'll be fine, her screams are heard and they hurry to save her. Just as they arrive in the room, she manages to release her head from the clamp and get off the table before the laser fires again. However, being in high heel boots, she trips over the teddy bear's glass eye on the floor and stumbles out the window, falling to her death. She landed on a car and her eye rolls into the road, where it is run over by another car

== Development ==
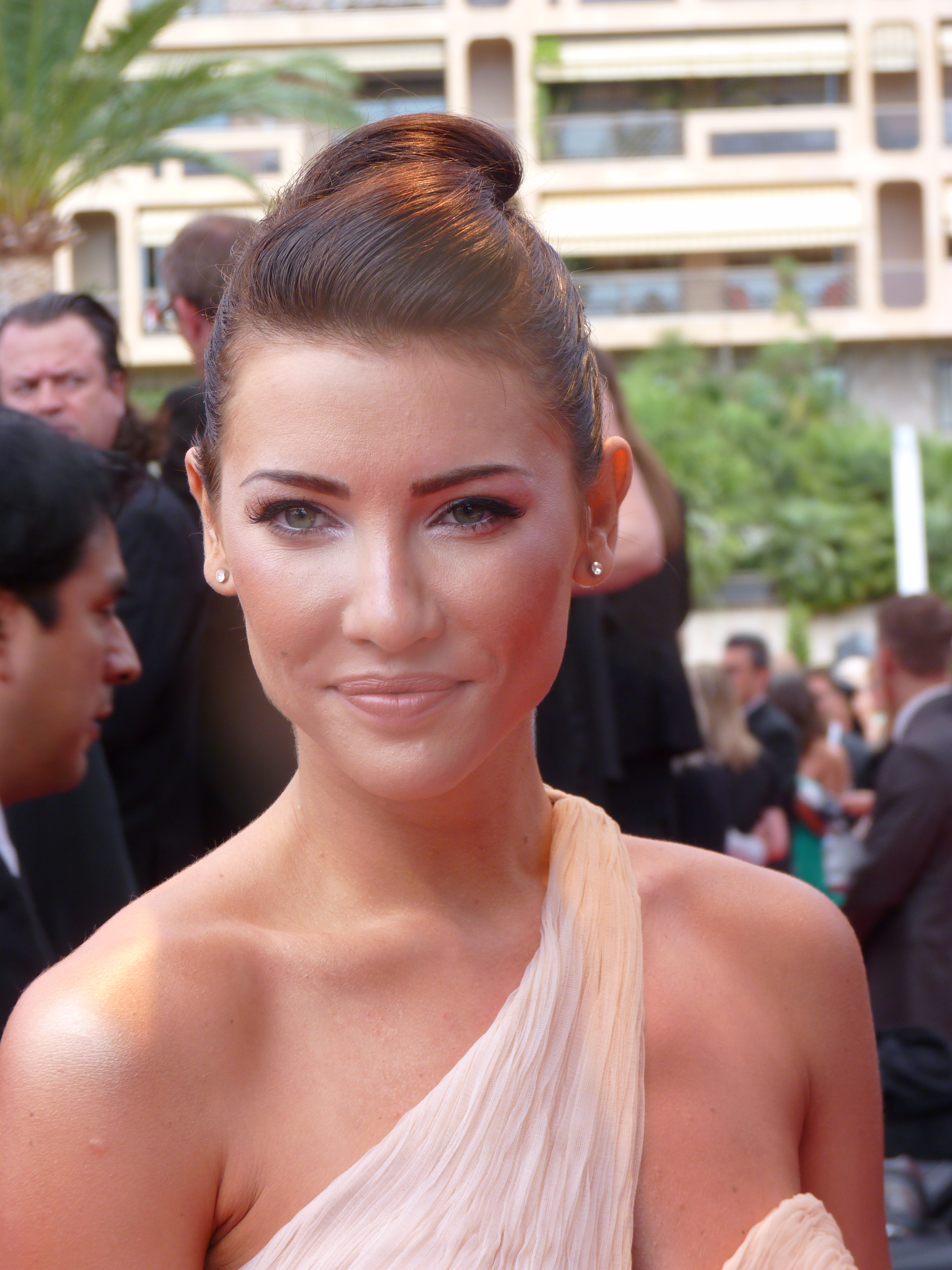
Jacqueline MacInnes Wood (pictured in 2012) was cast as Olivia.

=== Casting ===
In an interview, Jacqueline MacInnes Wood revealed that she has been a fan of the Final Destination series since she was a kid and talked about getting her part in Final Destination 5 and shooting her infamous death scene. She said:

"I was working on my show and found out they were auditioning," she says. "So I put it on tape at 6 in the morning - I couldn't get in [to read] because I was just shooting like crazy - and I found out by lunch that they wanted me."
"I shot [the scene] from 6 pm until 9 o'clock in the morning," she says, "and that speculum was probably in and out of my eye 60, 70 times. You keep numbing the eye, but after a while.... That fear, everything - that's real. That's exactly how I was feeling. There were times when I was trying to get to an emotional place - I was in a head vise, too - and the thing popped out of my eye. I didn't have any scrapes, maybe just one little tiny one, but I could handle it."

=== Characterization ===
When asked to describe her character, Jacqueline said, "She is a straight shooter, a girl you want to know. She is very honest, perhaps a little too honest sometimes. However, she doesn’t say to thing to intentionally hurt anyone. She just doesn’t have a filter. She walks the talk, and is the kind of gal every man and woman would want as their BFF. She looks at life like a front line soldier: she would rather fight to the death, rather than hide in a hole".

== Reception and analysis ==
The character has been generally well-received with many critics praising Jacqueline's performance. James Wood of Movie Pilot, gave Jacqueline's performance a positive review saying:

"The supporting cast in this one are the best, I really liked Jacqueline McInnes Wood, her performance is witty and sexy and at times quite funny, her character says some insensitive things at the most inappropriate of times!"

Irving Zarate, also writing for Movie Pilot called Olivia's death scene memorable saying:

"This death calls for little logic, but it is still effective. Anyone who saw this installment will not be getting an eye laser surgery any time soon. Vision is an important aspect of life, but when it comes to giving that up for a chance at sight then glasses don't seem so bad after all. Ultimately Olivia dies from falling out of a window, but it's the eerie sounds of the laser and its tragic aftermath that renders this scene unforgettable."

In a list of 15 memorable deaths from the Final Destination series, Comic Book Resources ranked Olivia's as the 6th, referring to it as one of the most horrifying due to the way it took advantage of an "scary procedure."

Allison Neves of the American Academy of Ophthalmology praised the eye surgery scene despite its inaccuracies, stating that “Horror filmmakers are required to push the limits of outrageous fantasy, and that’s what they’ve done here. It is their job to turn everyday scenarios into something sinister and diabolical in order to entertain an audience. This scene is pure Hollywood entertainment created for people who enjoy this genre.”

=== Influence on LASIK ===
Prior to her death in the movie, Olivia had her eye burned by a laser during a LASIK appointment. The scene was exaggerated and cannot happen in real life, but it still resulted in many patients becoming afraid of the procedure. Doctors had to assure patients that the movie's portrayal did not reflect actual eye surgery.
