= Supercuts =

American hair salon franchise

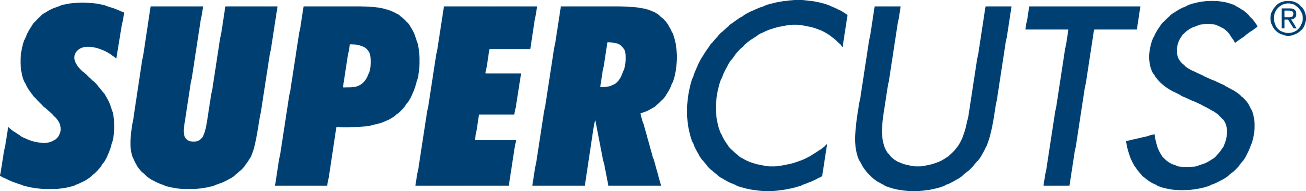

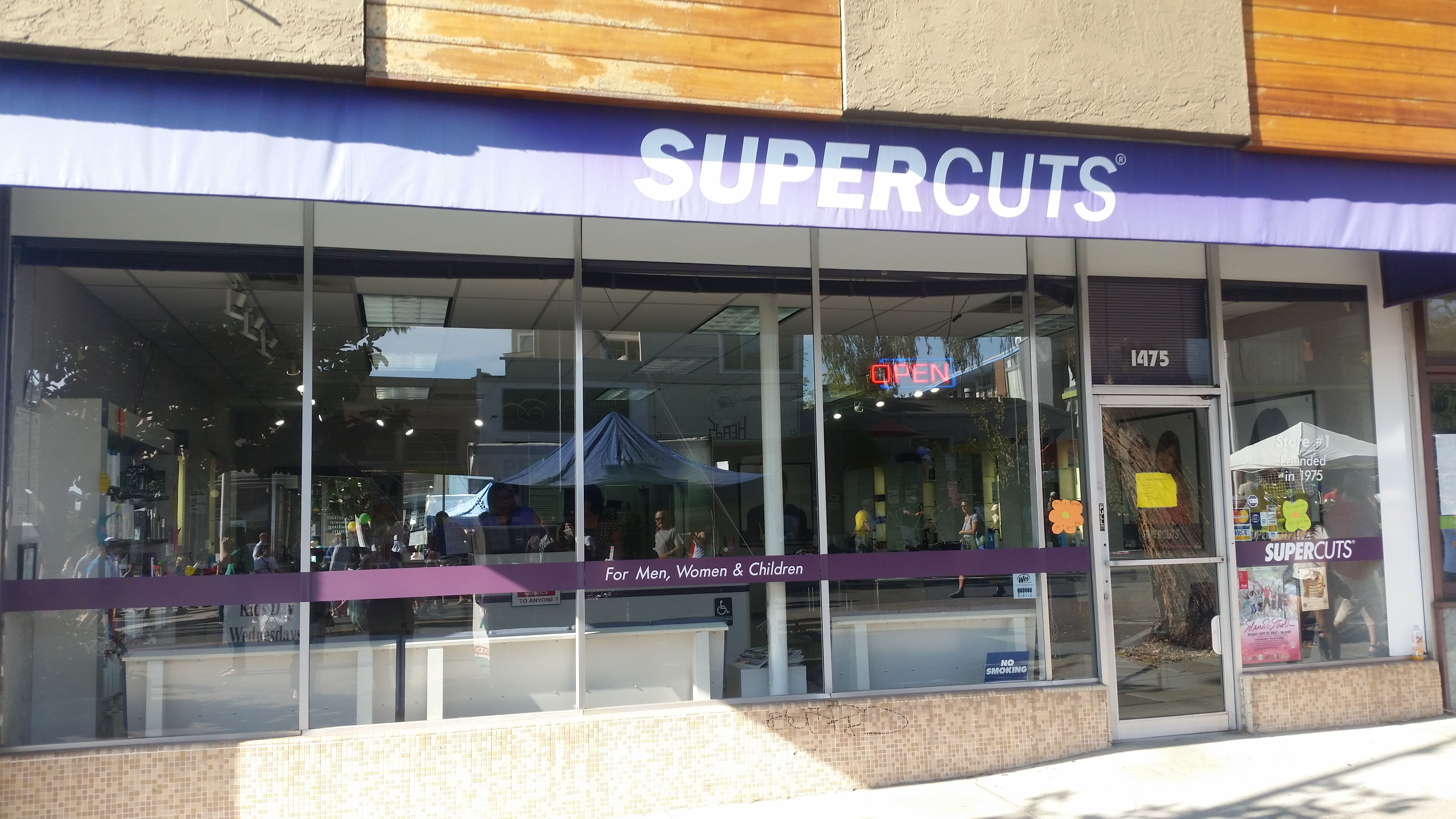
- First Supercuts store in Albany, California
- Type: Subsidiary
- Industry: Hair salon
- Founded: 1975; 51 years ago Albany, California, U.S.
- Founder: Geoffrey M. Rappaport; Frank E. Emmett
- Headquarters: Minneapolis, Minnesota
- Number of locations: 2,070
- Key people: Hugh Sawyer (CEO) (2017-2020)
- Parent: Regis Corporation
- Website: www.supercuts.com

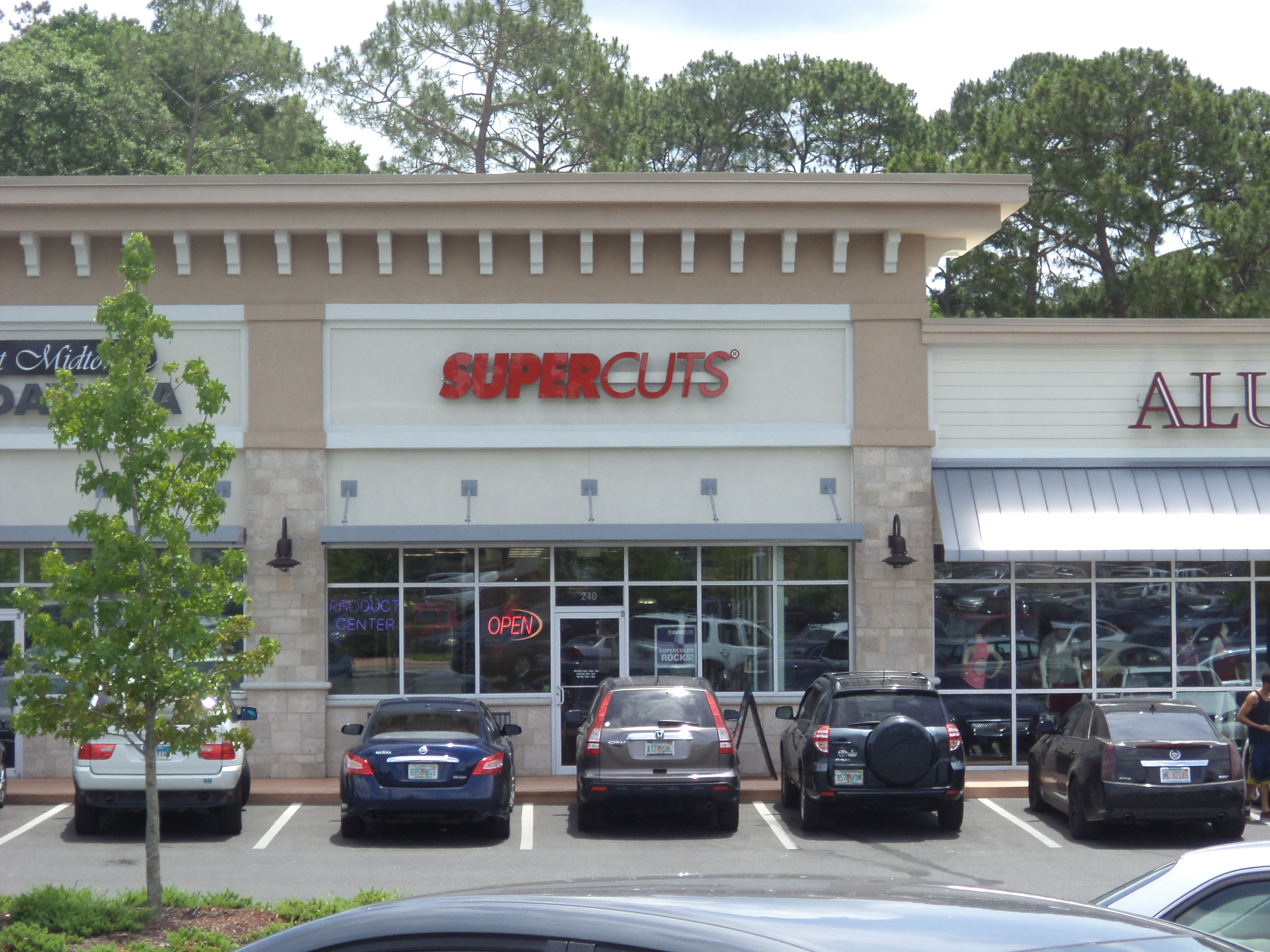
Supercuts in Tallahassee

Supercuts is a hair salon franchise with more than 2,400 locations across the United States, Canada (in the provinces of Ontario and New Brunswick), and the United Kingdom. The company was founded in the San Francisco Bay Area in 1975, by Geoffrey M. Rappaport and Frank E. Emmett. The company's first location was in Albany, California. The company's headquarters are located in Minneapolis, Minnesota.

Supercuts is a wholly owned subsidiary of Regis Corporation, which also owns Regis Salons, Mia & Maxx, MasterCuts, Cost Cutters, SmartStyle, and First Choice Haircutters in the United States and Canada.

The Supercuts salons in the United Kingdom are owned and operated by the Bushell Investment Group, a U.K.-based private family office focused on investing in small and medium enterprise businesses, under a franchise agreement with Regis Corporation.

== History ==
Supercuts was founded in 1975 in Albany, California, by Frank Emmett and Geoffrey Rappaport. It started franchising four years later. The company offered less costly services than upscale salons while still offering an alternative to the neighborhood barbershop. A significant marketing pillar of the brand was its unisex haircuts and the fact that customers did not need to book an appointment. Basic haircuts were $6 and add-on services made prices clearer than contemporary beauty salons. The founders developed a proprietary technique and trained their stylists to cut hair in just a few minutes. Stylists were also paid an hourly rate and received benefits, helping to attract cosmetology school graduates.

By the mid-1980s, hundreds of new Supercuts franchises had opened in 39 states. In 1987, the founders sold their brand for $21.4 million to a venture capital group led by David Lipson, who took the company public in 1991. After this, Lipson began opening more corporate-owned stores and buying back franchisees. Between 1991 and 1995, its revenue tripled from $32 million to $100.8 million and system-wide sales increased from $190 million to $295 million.

However, by 1995, the company was struggling. It had aggressively expanded into New York, and its resources were now spread thin. Its stock value had nearly halved since 1993 and Supercuts reported a $7.1-million loss for 1995. Lipson was accused of skirting tax laws, manipulating earnings reports, and other improprieties and was forced out as CEO and chairman in early 1996. He later faced insider trading charges.

In July 1996, Supercuts was acquired by Regis Corporation for $120 million. The company had approximately 1,150 stores at this time.
