= Jacqueline MacInnes Wood =

Canadian actress (born 1987)

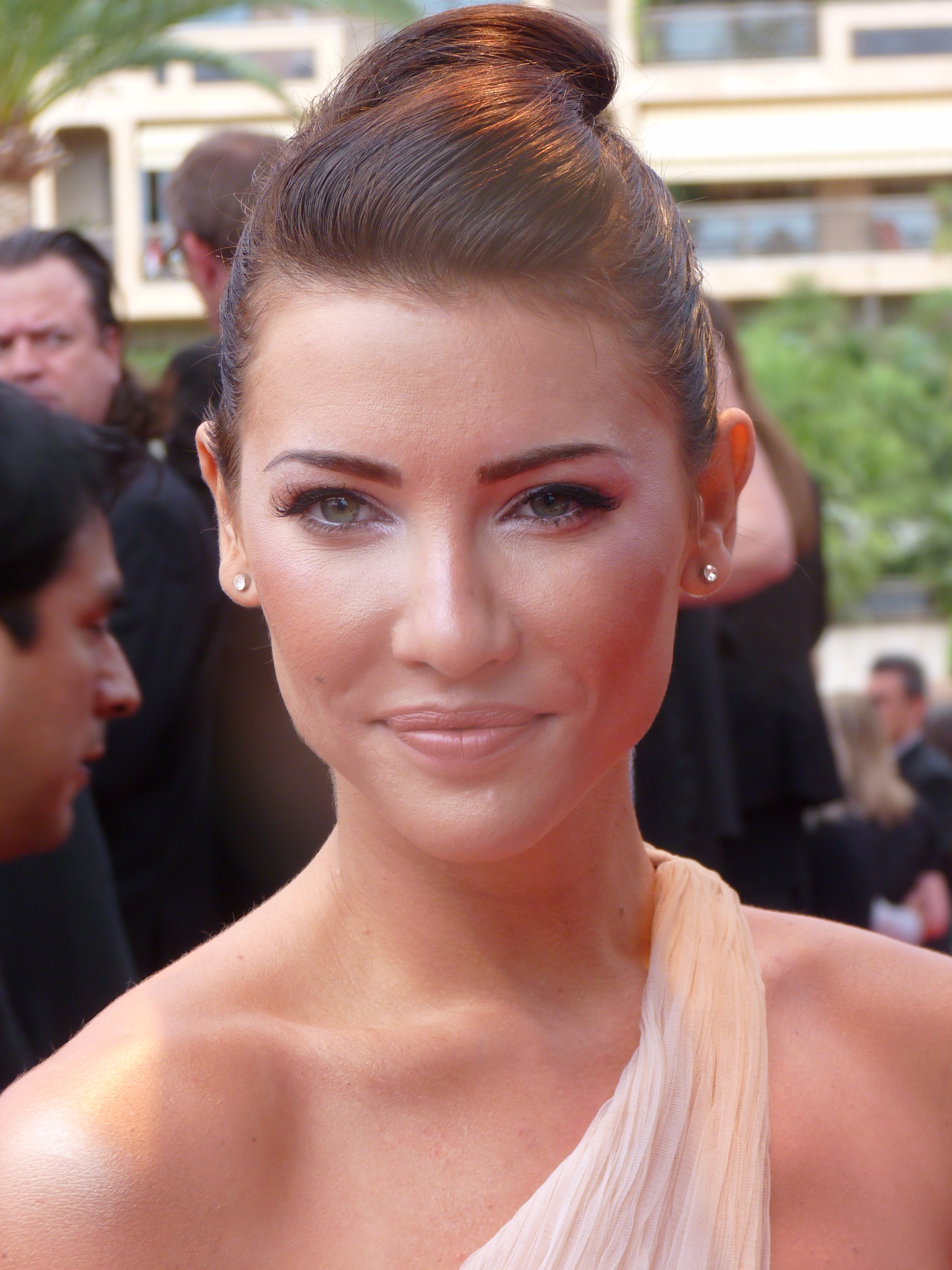
- Wood in 2012
- Born: April 17, 1987 (age 39); Windsor, Ontario, Canada
- Other name: Jacqui Mac
- Occupations: Actress; musician; television personality; model
- Years active: 2006–present
- Known for: Steffy Forrester on The Bold and the Beautiful
- Spouse: Elan Ruspoli (m. 2018)
- Children: 5
- Awards: Daytime Emmy Award for Outstanding Lead Actress in a Drama Series (2019, 2021, 2023)

Jacqueline MacInnes Wood (born April 17, 1987) is a Canadian actress, musician, model, and television personality. She is most recognized for playing the fashion executive and heiress Steffy Forrester on the CBS soap opera The Bold and the Beautiful, for which she won the Daytime Emmy Award for Outstanding Lead Actress in a Drama Series three times in 2019, 2021, and 2023.

== Early life ==
Wood was born in Windsor, Ontario, the daughter of (Sandie) Alexandra MacInnes and James C. Wood. Wood identifies herself as being of Cree, Scottish, French, and Brazilian ancestry. Her half sister is Dani Probert, who was the wife of the late NHL player, Bob Probert. Her great uncle is Scottish highland singer Alasdair Gillies. Wood took acting classes at Ryerson University, Centre for the Arts and the Armstrong Acting Studio.

== Career ==
=== Acting career ===
==== The Bold and the Beautiful ====
Wood made a name for herself playing the part of the "hair girl" on a commercial for First Choice Haircutters. At the age of 18, she moved to Toronto to pursue a career in acting. In May 2008, she began playing the contract role of Steffy Forrester on the American CBS Daytime soap opera The Bold and the Beautiful. Since Wood stepped into the role, Steffy has been noted as being a "bitch-nasty" vixen who is strong willed. Of playing her, Wood said in 2011, "I love playing her and developing her character. She is so different from me. It's rather cathartic, and it allows my alter ego to come out on The Bold and The Beautiful set five days a week."

In 2012, Wood received her very first nomination for Outstanding Younger Actress in a Drama Series for her portrayal of Steffy at the 39th Daytime Emmy Awards. Of learning about her Emmy nomination, she said, "I was just about to shoot a scene in the Adriatic sea in Italy. The water was only 54 degrees! [Executive Producer/Head Writer] Brad Bell came up to me and said, "How does it feel to be Emmy nominated?" For that year, Wood submitted the scenes in which Steffy is informed of the end of her affair with Bill.

In 2013, Wood garnered her second consecutive nomination in that category at the 40th Daytime Emmy Awards, in which she submitted the scenes where Steffy surprises Liam (Scott Clifton) by presenting him with signed annulment papers. In May 2013, news broke that Wood had opted not to renew her contract with the show in order to take another break. A representative for the show stated: "[Wood] is taking short a break, as she has done in the past, from B&B. She remains as the character of 'Steffy Forrester' and is continuing to tape, currently with episodes airing through July 2013 and then beyond". It was later announced that Wood has decided to remain with the series on a recurring basis.

In April 2015, it was announced that Wood would reprise her role on B&B on a contract basis, which she has remained on ever since. For the 2018 Daytime Emmy Awards, Wood received a nomination for Outstanding Supporting Actress in a Drama Series in the role. In the following year, Wood ascended and earned a nomination for Outstanding Lead Actress in a Drama Series, becoming the fifth actress overall, to have been nominated in all three drama performer categories. At the 2019 Daytime Emmy Awards ceremony, Wood won her first Daytime Emmy in the Lead Actress category. Wood went on and won her second Daytime Emmy in the Lead Actress category in 2021.

==== Other roles ====
In 2011, she starred in her first feature film, Final Destination 5. In September 2010, Wood's casting was announced and it was revealed that filming was underway in Vancouver, British Columbia, Canada. This film is the fifth in the Final Destination horror film franchise. Wood portrayed Olivia Castle. The character was described as "a smart mouthed beauty who wears glasses" and is "caught in a spine chilling, stomach churning situation that will make viewers squirm in their seats", which was a risky eye procedure which Wood was terrified to do. Final Destination 5 was a critical and commercial success, grossing over $157 million at the American Box Office, and becoming the highest-rated film from the franchise at the website Rotten Tomatoes, where it has been awarded a "Fresh" rating, consisting of 61% positive reviews from film critics. Her performance also received very positive reviews.

Wood had a guest role on The CW action-adventure series Arrow, which began airing in October 2012. She played Sara Lance (which she is later replaced by Caity Lotz). Arrow opened to positive reviews from critics and ratings of over 4.1 million. In 2013, Wood completed filming a Lifetime television film Her Husband's Betrayal, a suspense thriller in which she stars opposite Shawn Roberts. The film premiered on 2 August 2013. In July 2014, Wood filmed an appearance on the comedy series Anger Management, starring opposite Charlie Sheen. The episode aired on 1 September 2014.

=== Other ventures ===
Apart from her acting, Wood is an occasional disc jockey and singer. She released her debut single "After Hours", a dance-influenced song penned by her wardrobe stylist, Chaz E. Foley, in January 2012. Jamey Giddens of Zap2it described the "After Hours" music video as "naughty", and said "I am digging this thumping, raunchy track and the provocative video." In October 2012, Wood, who is described by Zap2it as a "vixen", covered Maxim magazine's 2013 Mini Calendar.

On 22 August 2013, it was announced that Wood would serve as host for an upcoming E! television series, Party On, which is an "eight-episode series" that is dedicated to "exposing the best party scenes the world has to offer". Vice president of programming and development for the network, Jeff Olde, stated: "We are excited to take viewers around the globe and behind the velvet ropes for fun in the sun at only the hottest, most elite vacation locales." Executive producer David Granger stated, "Jacqui is a brilliant host and we all see a wonderful opportunity to produce something very new and different given the high end glamour and sun soaked mischief that Europe has to offer." The series premiered on 5 December 2013.

== Personal life ==
Wood is a supporter of pet rescue organizations, devoting time to spreading awareness via social activism including Twitter and Instagram about dog shelters and pet owners' responsibility, in addition to volunteering with charitable initiatives benefiting animal rescue.

In November 2017, Wood announced her engagement to Creative Artists Agency talent agent, Elan Ruspoli, and the pair eloped in July 2018. On March 4, 2019, Wood gave birth to their first child, a son. On February 21, 2021, Wood gave birth to their second son. In May 2022, Wood gave birth to their third son. On August 27, 2023, Wood gave birth to their fourth son. In October 2025, Wood announced she gave birth to their fifth son. She and Ruspoli reside with their children in Westlake Village, California.

== Filmography ==
=== Film ===
Year	Title	Role	Notes	Ref.
2008	Nightmare at the End of the Hall	Laurel / Jane Hammond	Television film	
2009	Skyrunners	Julie 'Smoking' Gunn	Television film	
2010	Turn the Beat Around	Irena	Television film	
2011	Final Destination 5	Olivia Castle		
2013	Her Husband's Betrayal	Cathy Coulter	Television film	

=== Television ===
Year(s)	Title	Role	Notes	Ref.
2006	Runaway	Candice	Episode: "End Game"	
2007	Lovebites	Faith		
2008	MVP	Ava	2 episodes	
2008	Gamer Girlz	Max		
2008–2013, 2015–present	The Bold and the Beautiful	Steffy Forrester	Main role	
2012	Arrow	Sara Lance	Episode: "Pilot"	
2013	Party On	Herself / Host	8 episodes	
2014	Anger Management	Jane	Episode: "Charlie and the Temper of Doom"	
2014	Castle	Chelsea	Episode: "The Time of Our Lives"	
2015	19-2	Mary Louise Dumas	2 episodes	
2015	South Beach	Samantha Lear	Hulu original series	
2016	Les Anges	Herself	2 episodes	

=== Music videos ===
Year(s)	Title	Artist
2011	New Romance	Miles Fisher

== Discography ==
- 2012: "After Hours"
- 2012: "Girl You Knew"

== Awards and nominations ==
Year	Award	Category	Work	Result	Ref.
2012	Daytime Emmy Award	Outstanding Younger Actress in a Drama Series	The Bold and the Beautiful	Nominated	
2013	Daytime Emmy Award	Outstanding Younger Actress in a Drama Series	The Bold and the Beautiful	Nominated	
2018	Daytime Emmy Award	Outstanding Supporting Actress in a Drama Series	The Bold and the Beautiful	Nominated	
2018	Soap Awards France	Best Actress of the Year	The Bold and the Beautiful	Nominated	
2019	Daytime Emmy Award	Outstanding Lead Actress in a Drama Series	The Bold and the Beautiful	Won	
2019	Soap Awards France	Best International Actor / Actress	The Bold and the Beautiful	Nominated	
2020	Soap Hub Awards	The Bold and the Beautiful Favorite Actress	The Bold and the Beautiful	Won	
2021	Daytime Emmy Award	Outstanding Lead Actress in a Drama Series	The Bold and the Beautiful	Won	
2021	Soap Awards France	Best International Actress	The Bold and the Beautiful	Nominated	
2021	Soap Hub Awards	The Bold and the Beautiful Favorite Actress	The Bold and the Beautiful	Won	
2023	Daytime Emmy Award	Outstanding Lead Actress in a Drama Series	The Bold and the Beautiful	Won	
