= 2002 Dodge/Save Mart 350 =

16th race of the 2002 NASCAR Winston Cup Series

Race details
- Race 16 of 36 in the 2002 NASCAR Winston Cup Series
- The 2002 Dodge/Save Mart 350 program cover.
- Date: June 23, 2002
- Official name: 14th Annual Dodge/Save Mart 350
- Location: Sonoma, California, Infineon Raceway
- Course: Permanent racing facility
- Course length: 1.99 miles (3.20 km)
- Distance: 110 laps, 218.9 mi (352.285 km)
- Scheduled distance: 110 laps, 218.9 mi (352.285 km)
- Average speed: 81.007 miles per hour (130.368 km/h)

Pole position
Driver	Tony Stewart	Joe Gibbs Racing
- Time: 1:16.640

Most laps led
Driver	Jeff Gordon	Hendrick Motorsports
- Laps: 31

Winner
No. 28	Ricky Rudd	Robert Yates Racing

Television in the United States
- Network: FOX
- Announcers: Mike Joy, Larry McReynolds, Darrell Waltrip

Radio in the United States
- Radio: Performance Racing Network

The 2002 Dodge/Save Mart 350 was the 16th stock car race of the 2002 NASCAR Winston Cup Series and the 14th iteration of the event. The race was held on Sunday, June 23, 2002, in Sonoma, California, at the club layout in Infineon Raceway, a 1.99 miles (3.20 km) permanent road course layout. The race took the scheduled 110 laps to complete. Ricky Rudd, driving for Robert Yates Racing, would take advantage of a disaster-stricken Jerry Nadeau when Nadeau suffered rear end problems while leading with three to go. The win was Rudd's 23rd and final NASCAR Winston Cup Series win and his first and only win of the season. To fill out the podium, Tony Stewart of Joe Gibbs Racing and Terry Labonte of Hendrick Motorsports would finish second and third, respectively.

== Background ==
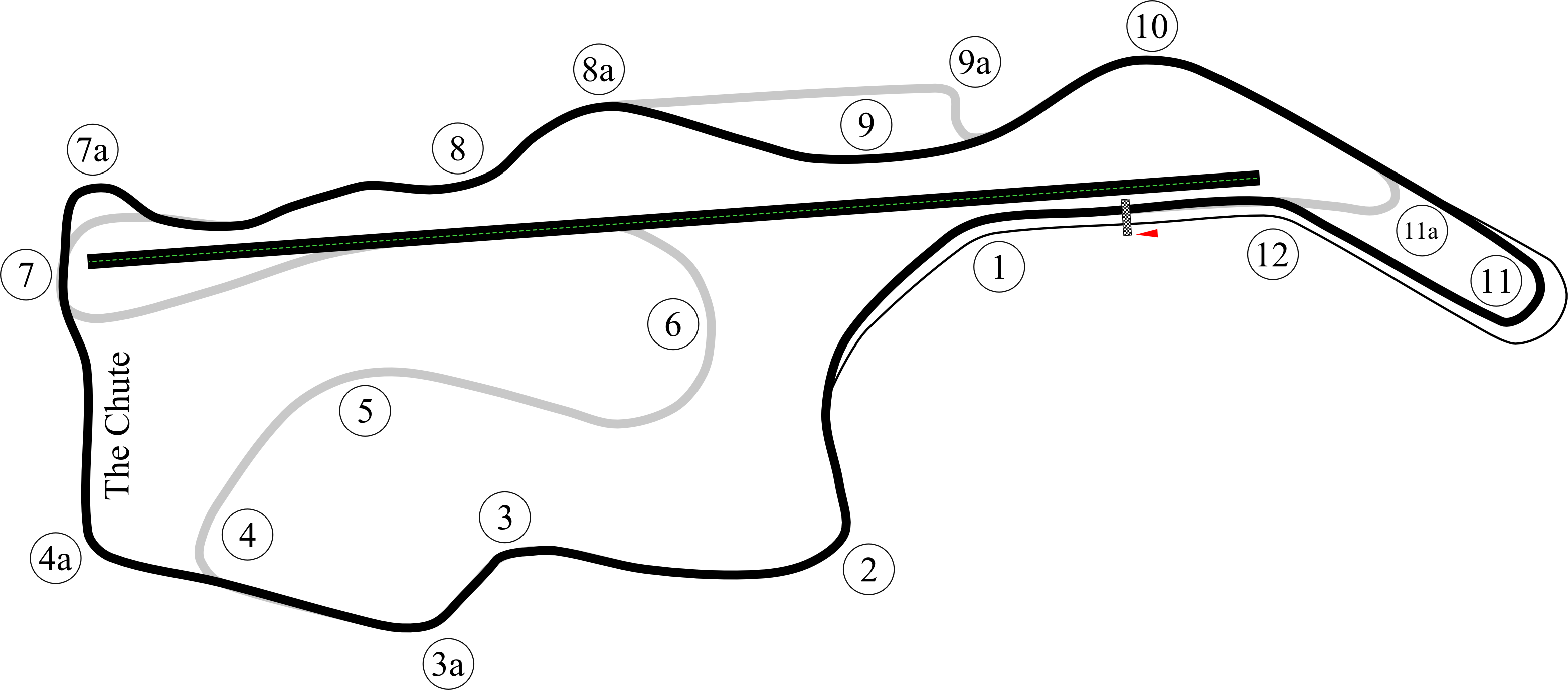
The layout of Infineon Raceway used by NASCAR at the time.

Infineon Raceway is one of two road courses to hold NASCAR races, the other being Watkins Glen International. The standard road course at Infineon Raceway is a 12-turn course that is 2.52 miles (4.06 km) long; the track was modified in 1998, adding the Chute, which bypassed turns 5 and 6, shortening the course to 1.95 miles (3.14 km). The Chute was only used for NASCAR events such as this race, and was criticized by many drivers, who preferred the full layout. In 2001, it was replaced with a 70-degree turn, 4A, bringing the track to its current dimensions of 1.99 miles (3.20 km).

=== Entry list ===
- (R) denotes rookie driver.

#	Driver	Team	Make
0	Jim Inglebright	Roadrunner Motorsports	Chevrolet
1	Steve Park	Dale Earnhardt, Inc.	Chevrolet
2	Rusty Wallace	Penske Racing	Ford
4	Mike Skinner	Morgan–McClure Motorsports	Chevrolet
5	Terry Labonte	Hendrick Motorsports	Chevrolet
6	Mark Martin	Roush Racing	Ford
7	Casey Atwood	Ultra-Evernham Motorsports	Dodge
8	Dale Earnhardt Jr.	Dale Earnhardt, Inc.	Chevrolet
9	Bill Elliott	Evernham Motorsports	Dodge
10	Johnny Benson Jr.	MBV Motorsports	Pontiac
11	Brett Bodine	Brett Bodine Racing	Ford
12	Ryan Newman (R)	Penske Racing	Ford
14	Stacy Compton	A. J. Foyt Enterprises	Pontiac
15	Michael Waltrip	Dale Earnhardt, Inc.	Chevrolet
17	Matt Kenseth	Roush Racing	Ford
18	Bobby Labonte	Joe Gibbs Racing	Pontiac
19	Jeremy Mayfield	Evernham Motorsports	Dodge
20	Tony Stewart	Joe Gibbs Racing	Pontiac
21	Elliott Sadler	Wood Brothers Racing	Ford
22	Ward Burton	Bill Davis Racing	Dodge
23	Hut Stricklin	Bill Davis Racing	Dodge
24	Jeff Gordon	Hendrick Motorsports	Chevrolet
25	Joe Nemechek	Hendrick Motorsports	Chevrolet
26	Todd Bodine	Haas-Carter Motorsports	Ford
28	Ricky Rudd	Robert Yates Racing	Ford
29	Kevin Harvick	Richard Childress Racing	Chevrolet
30	Jeff Green	Richard Childress Racing	Chevrolet
31	Robby Gordon	Richard Childress Racing	Chevrolet
32	Ricky Craven	PPI Motorsports	Ford
36	Ken Schrader	MB2 Motorsports	Pontiac
40	Sterling Marlin	Chip Ganassi Racing	Dodge
41	Jimmy Spencer	Chip Ganassi Racing	Dodge
43	John Andretti	Petty Enterprises	Dodge
44	Jerry Nadeau	Petty Enterprises	Dodge
45	Kyle Petty	Petty Enterprises	Dodge
46	Brandon Ash	Ash Motorsports	Ford
48	Jimmie Johnson (R)	Hendrick Motorsports	Chevrolet
55	Bobby Hamilton	Andy Petree Racing	Chevrolet
62	Austin Cameron	Orleans Racing	Chevrolet
67	Boris Said	Jasper Motorsports	Ford
77	Dave Blaney	Jasper Motorsports	Ford
87	Ron Fellows	NEMCO Motorsports	Chevrolet
88	Dale Jarrett	Robert Yates Racing	Ford
97	Kurt Busch	Roush Racing	Ford
99	Jeff Burton	Roush Racing	Ford
Official entry list

== Practice ==
=== First practice ===
The first practice session was held on Friday, June 21, at 10:20 AM PST, and would last for two hours. Ryan Newman of Penske Racing would set the fastest time in the session, with a lap of 1:16.664 and an average speed of 93.447 miles per hour (150.388 km/h).

Pos.	#	Driver	Team	Make	Time	Speed
1	12	Ryan Newman (R)	Penske Racing	Ford	1:16.664	93.447
2	20	Tony Stewart	Joe Gibbs Racing	Pontiac	1:16.679	93.428
3	97	Kurt Busch	Roush Racing	Ford	1:16.704	93.398
Full first practice results

=== Second practice ===
The second practice session was held on Saturday, June 22, at 9:30 AM PST, and would last for 45 minutes. Rusty Wallace of Penske Racing would set the fastest time in the session, with a lap of 1:17.455 and an average speed of 92.492 miles per hour (148.851 km/h).

Pos.	#	Driver	Team	Make	Time	Speed
1	2	Rusty Wallace	Penske Racing	Ford	1:17.455	92.492
2	9	Bill Elliott	Evernham Motorsports	Dodge	1:17.491	92.449
3	31	Robby Gordon	Richard Childress Racing	Chevrolet	1:17.496	92.443
Full second practice results

=== Final practice ===
The final practice session was held on Saturday, June 22, at 11:15 AM PST, and would last for 45 minutes. Robby Gordon of Richard Childress Racing would set the fastest time in the session, with a lap of 1:16.110 and an average speed of 94.127 miles per hour (151.483 km/h).

Pos.	#	Driver	Team	Make	Time	Speed
1	31	Robby Gordon	Richard Childress Racing	Chevrolet	1:16.110	94.127
2	6	Mark Martin	Roush Racing	Ford	1:16.926	93.129
3	2	Rusty Wallace	Penske Racing	Ford	1:16.940	93.112
Full Final practice results

== Qualifying ==
Qualifying was held on Friday, June 21, at 2:05 PM PST. Drivers would each have one lap to set a lap time. Positions 1-36 would be decided on time, while positions 37-43 would be based on provisionals. Six spots are awarded by the use of provisionals based on owner's points. The seventh is awarded to a past champion who has not otherwise qualified for the race. If no past champ needs the provisional, the next team in the owner points will be awarded a provisional.

Tony Stewart of Joe Gibbs Racing would win the pole, setting a time of 1:16.640 and an average speed of 93.476 miles per hour (150.435 km/h).

Two drivers would fail to qualify: Stacy Compton and Brandon Ash.

=== Full qualifying results ===
Pos.	#	Driver	Team	Make	Time	Speed
1	20	Tony Stewart	Joe Gibbs Racing	Pontiac	1:16.640	93.476
2	97	Kurt Busch	Roush Racing	Ford	1:16.880	93.184
3	99	Jeff Burton	Roush Racing	Ford	1:16.895	93.166
4	24	Jeff Gordon	Hendrick Motorsports	Chevrolet	1:16.916	93.141
5	9	Bill Elliott	Evernham Motorsports	Dodge	1:16.936	93.116
6	17	Matt Kenseth	Roush Racing	Ford	1:16.975	93.069
7	28	Ricky Rudd	Robert Yates Racing	Ford	1:16.994	93.046
8	2	Rusty Wallace	Penske Racing	Ford	1:17.024	93.010
9	31	Robby Gordon	Richard Childress Racing	Chevrolet	1:17.042	92.988
10	67	Boris Said	Jasper Motorsports	Ford	1:17.075	92.948
11	22	Ward Burton	Bill Davis Racing	Dodge	1:17.157	92.850
12	6	Mark Martin	Roush Racing	Ford	1:17.205	92.792
13	43	John Andretti	Petty Enterprises	Dodge	1:17.472	92.472
14	18	Bobby Labonte	Joe Gibbs Racing	Pontiac	1:17.488	92.453
15	48	Jimmie Johnson (R)	Hendrick Motorsports	Chevrolet	1:17.529	92.404
16	4	Mike Skinner	Morgan–McClure Motorsports	Chevrolet	1:17.536	92.396
17	12	Ryan Newman (R)	Penske Racing	Ford	1:17.551	92.378
18	36	Ken Schrader	MB2 Motorsports	Pontiac	1:17.642	92.270
19	87	Ron Fellows	NEMCO Motorsports	Chevrolet	1:17.849	92.024
20	15	Michael Waltrip	Dale Earnhardt, Inc.	Chevrolet	1:17.915	91.946
21	77	Dave Blaney	Jasper Motorsports	Ford	1:17.971	91.880
22	44	Jerry Nadeau	Petty Enterprises	Dodge	1:18.033	91.807
23	8	Dale Earnhardt Jr.	Dale Earnhardt, Inc.	Chevrolet	1:18.053	91.784
24	29	Kevin Harvick	Richard Childress Racing	Chevrolet	1:18.072	91.761
25	11	Brett Bodine	Brett Bodine Racing	Ford	1:18.130	91.693
26	19	Jeremy Mayfield	Evernham Motorsports	Dodge	1:18.228	91.578
27	45	Kyle Petty	Petty Enterprises	Dodge	1:18.238	91.567
28	25	Joe Nemechek	Hendrick Motorsports	Chevrolet	1:18.244	91.560
29	26	Todd Bodine	Haas-Carter Motorsports	Ford	1:18.339	91.449
30	10	Johnny Benson Jr.	MBV Motorsports	Pontiac	1:18.391	91.388
31	55	Bobby Hamilton	Andy Petree Racing	Chevrolet	1:18.437	91.334
32	62	Austin Cameron	Orleans Racing	Chevrolet	1:18.532	91.224
33	30	Jeff Green	Richard Childress Racing	Chevrolet	1:18.566	91.185
34	0	Jim Inglebright	Roadrunner Motorsports	Chevrolet	1:18.574	91.175
35	41	Jimmy Spencer	Chip Ganassi Racing	Dodge	1:18.620	91.122
36	40	Sterling Marlin	Chip Ganassi Racing	Dodge	1:18.677	91.056
Provisionals
37	88	Dale Jarrett	Robert Yates Racing	Ford	—	—
38	32	Ricky Craven	PPI Motorsports	Ford	1:19.468	90.149
39	5	Terry Labonte	Hendrick Motorsports	Chevrolet	1:19.436	90.186
40	21	Elliott Sadler	Wood Brothers Racing	Ford	1:23.223	86.082
41	23	Hut Stricklin	Bill Davis Racing	Dodge	1:19.206	90.448
42	1	Steve Park	Dale Earnhardt, Inc.	Chevrolet	1:20.523	88.968
43	7	Casey Atwood	Ultra-Evernham Motorsports	Dodge	1:18.731	90.993
Failed to qualify
44	14	Stacy Compton	A. J. Foyt Enterprises	Pontiac	1:20.081	89.459
45	46	Brandon Ash	Ash Motorsports	Ford	1:19.619	89.979
Official qualifying results

== Race results ==
Fin	St	#	Driver	Team	Make	Laps	Led	Status	Pts	Winnings
1	7	28	Ricky Rudd	Robert Yates Racing	Ford	110	3	running	180	$184,992
2	1	20	Tony Stewart	Joe Gibbs Racing	Pontiac	110	6	running	175	$143,203
3	39	5	Terry Labonte	Hendrick Motorsports	Chevrolet	110	0	running	165	$113,933
4	2	97	Kurt Busch	Roush Racing	Ford	110	30	running	165	$81,765
5	33	30	Jeff Green	Richard Childress Racing	Chevrolet	110	0	running	155	$63,990
6	40	21	Elliott Sadler	Wood Brothers Racing	Ford	110	0	running	150	$84,815
7	12	6	Mark Martin	Roush Racing	Ford	110	0	running	146	$93,048
8	5	9	Bill Elliott	Evernham Motorsports	Dodge	110	3	running	147	$83,546
9	17	12	Ryan Newman (R)	Penske Racing	Ford	110	0	running	138	$82,502
10	13	43	John Andretti	Petty Enterprises	Dodge	110	15	running	139	$95,643
11	9	31	Robby Gordon	Richard Childress Racing	Chevrolet	110	0	running	130	$82,006
12	16	4	Mike Skinner	Morgan–McClure Motorsports	Chevrolet	110	0	running	127	$69,385
13	14	18	Bobby Labonte	Joe Gibbs Racing	Pontiac	110	0	running	124	$96,003
14	24	29	Kevin Harvick	Richard Childress Racing	Chevrolet	110	0	running	121	$95,453
15	37	88	Dale Jarrett	Robert Yates Racing	Ford	110	0	running	118	$100,353
16	30	10	Johnny Benson Jr.	MBV Motorsports	Pontiac	110	0	running	115	$79,650
17	27	45	Kyle Petty	Petty Enterprises	Dodge	110	0	running	112	$52,020
18	28	25	Joe Nemechek	Hendrick Motorsports	Chevrolet	110	0	running	109	$59,475
19	38	32	Ricky Craven	PPI Motorsports	Ford	110	0	running	106	$59,175
20	21	77	Dave Blaney	Jasper Motorsports	Ford	110	0	running	103	$74,275
21	43	7	Casey Atwood	Ultra-Evernham Motorsports	Dodge	110	0	running	100	$61,850
22	20	15	Michael Waltrip	Dale Earnhardt, Inc.	Chevrolet	110	0	running	97	$59,175
23	42	1	Steve Park	Dale Earnhardt, Inc.	Chevrolet	110	0	running	94	$80,500
24	25	11	Brett Bodine	Brett Bodine Racing	Ford	110	1	running	96	$58,439
25	19	87	Ron Fellows	NEMCO Motorsports	Chevrolet	110	0	running	88	$47,930
26	29	26	Todd Bodine	Haas-Carter Motorsports	Ford	110	1	running	90	$47,500
27	8	2	Rusty Wallace	Penske Racing	Ford	110	0	running	82	$91,715
28	26	19	Jeremy Mayfield	Evernham Motorsports	Dodge	109	0	running	79	$55,380
29	3	99	Jeff Burton	Roush Racing	Ford	109	0	running	76	$92,527
30	23	8	Dale Earnhardt Jr.	Dale Earnhardt, Inc.	Chevrolet	109	0	running	73	$84,607
31	31	55	Bobby Hamilton	Andy Petree Racing	Chevrolet	109	0	running	70	$55,250
32	34	0	Jim Inglebright	Roadrunner Motorsports	Chevrolet	109	0	running	67	$47,190
33	41	23	Hut Stricklin	Bill Davis Racing	Dodge	109	0	running	64	$55,160
34	22	44	Jerry Nadeau	Petty Enterprises	Dodge	107	20	rear end	66	$47,150
35	15	48	Jimmie Johnson (R)	Hendrick Motorsports	Chevrolet	104	0	rear end	58	$47,130
36	35	41	Jimmy Spencer	Chip Ganassi Racing	Dodge	104	0	rear end	55	$47,110
37	4	24	Jeff Gordon	Hendrick Motorsports	Chevrolet	103	31	running	62	$110,368
38	18	36	Ken Schrader	MB2 Motorsports	Pontiac	97	0	running	49	$55,070
39	6	17	Matt Kenseth	Roush Racing	Ford	90	0	running	46	$65,045
40	11	22	Ward Burton	Bill Davis Racing	Dodge	86	0	engine	43	$90,010
41	10	67	Boris Said	Jasper Motorsports	Ford	82	0	crash	40	$46,975
42	32	62	Austin Cameron	Orleans Racing	Chevrolet	24	0	clutch	37	$46,945
43	36	40	Sterling Marlin	Chip Ganassi Racing	Dodge	19	0	engine	34	$89,475
Official race results

Previous race: 2002 Sirius Satellite Radio 400	NASCAR Winston Cup Series; 2002 season	Next race: 2002 Pepsi 400
