= First Choice Haircutters =

Canadian hairdressing company

- Type: Subsidiary
- Genre: Value Priced
- Founded: 1980
- Founder: A. Bud Cowan
- Headquarters: Mississauga, Ontario, Canada
- Number of locations: 400+
- Area served: North America
- Key people: John Fraser
- Parent: Regis Corporation
- Website: http://www.firstchoice.com/

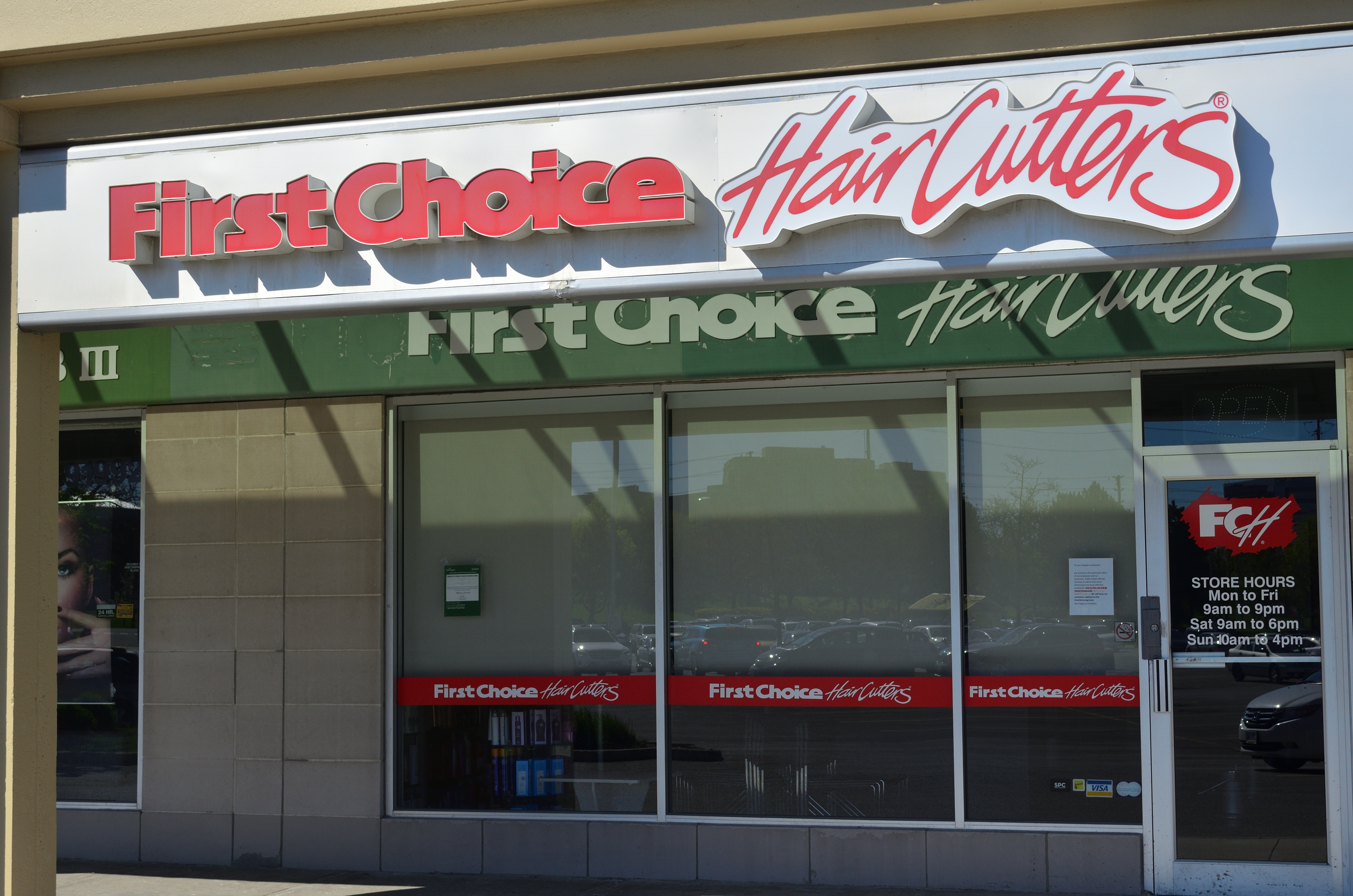
First Choice Haircutters in Markham

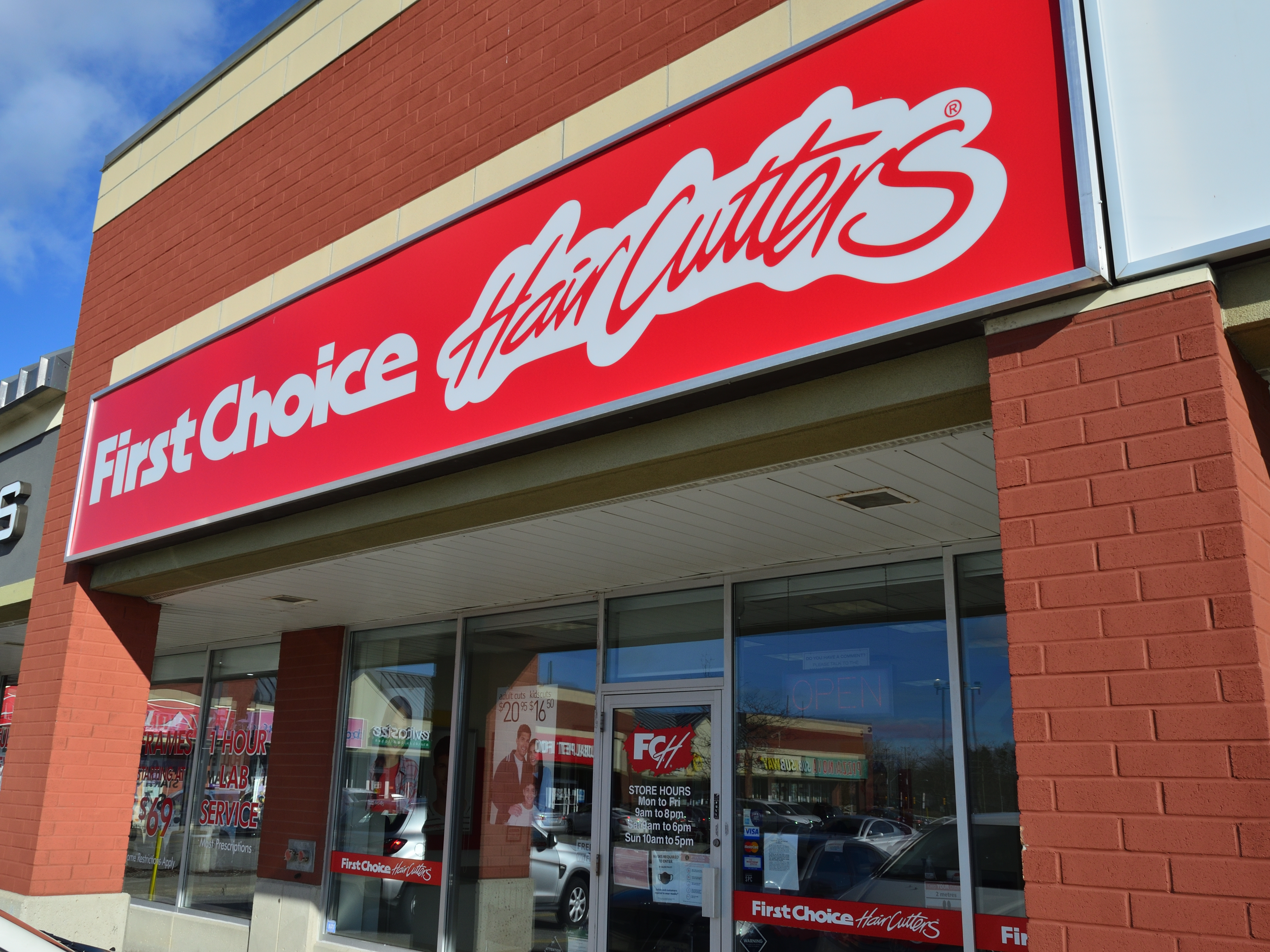
First Choice Haircutters in Vaughan

First Choice Haircutters is a Canadian hair salon company. The company originated with a single salon in London, Ontario, in 1980 and began franchising about 2 years later. First Choice Haircutters was purchased by American hair salon conglomerate Regis Corporation in October 2000. Currently, it has over 400 locations throughout Canada and one in the United States (in Toledo, Ohio). It is a franchise company, and experienced system-wide sales of nearly $3 billion in 2007. First Choice Haircutters is a subsidiary of Regis Corporation, the largest hair salon chain in the world which also owns other concepts such as Supercuts, Vidal Sassoon, Cost Cutters and SmartStyle.

== Company origin and profile ==
The company headquarters are located in Regis Corporation's home office, based in Minneapolis, MN. Often located in strip malls, the company describes itself as targeting "value-conscious families". Most salons are 800–1000 square feet, with a minimum frontage of 15 feet. The salons operate primarily on a “walk-in” or no appointment necessary basis. First Choice Haircutters offers a seven-day guarantee on all their products and services. In 2018, the company launched First Choice Cares, a national initiative intended to provide free haircuts to those in need in the communities the company is in. The initiative has provided roughly 500 free cuts since May 2019.

== Related stories ==
The Canadian actress Jacqueline MacInnes Wood, who later went on to act in the soap opera The Bold and the Beautiful, made her debut in a commercial for the company. She was only eighteen when she played the part of "the hair girl" on the commercial; the ad was still running three years later.
