= Sport Clips =

American hair salon chain

Sport Clips, Inc.
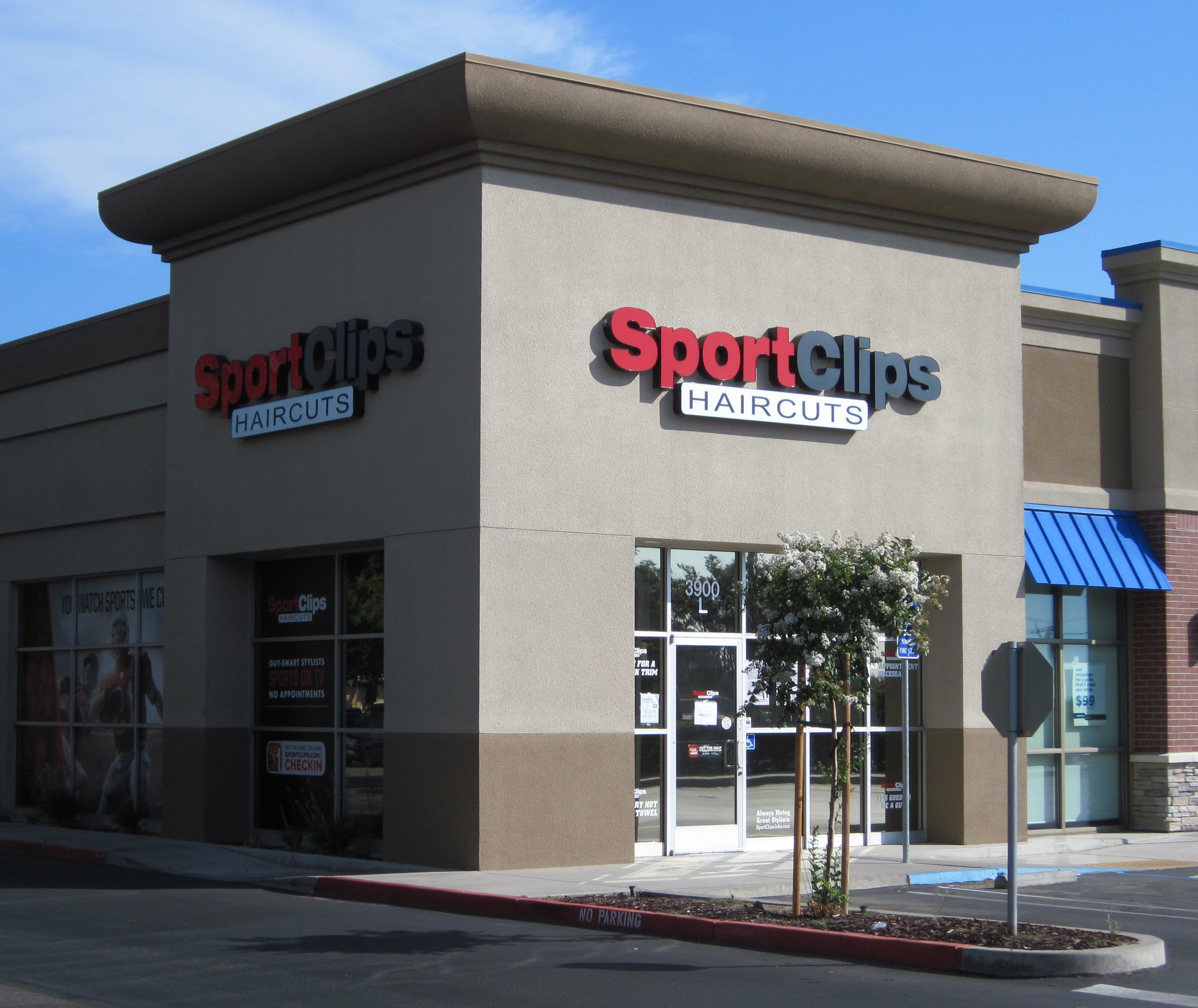
- A Sport Clips location in Modesto, California
- Type: Private
- Industry: Hair salon
- Founded: 1993; 33 years ago
- Founder: Gordon Logan
- Headquarters: Georgetown, Texas
- Website: www.sportclips.com

Sport Clips is an American hair salon chain with over 1,800 locations across the United States and Canada. Its headquarters is in Georgetown, Texas, which it was founded in nearby Austin, Texas by Gordon Logan in 1993. Sport Clips is a competitor of Great Clips and Supercuts.

== History ==
In 1993, Gordon Logan, an air force veteran, founded Sport Clips because he wanted a hair salon that would focus only on men and boys. Logan had been a barber for a decade before he opened his own company. The first Sport Clips store was opened in Austin, Texas, in 1993. Over the years, the company grew into a national brand. Sport Clips began franchising in 1995, and their headquarters was opened soon afterward in Houston, Texas.

In five years, Sport Clips grew to 50 locations, and just two years later, they celebrated the opening of their 100th store. By 2016, Sport Clips had over 1,500 locations. In 2022, Sport Clips surpassed 1,900 locations throughout the United States and Canada.

In July 2020, Edward Logan, who is the son of Gordon Logan, became the new CEO of Sport Clips.

== Corporate overview ==
Sport Clips has over 1,800 locations in the United States and Canada. As of 2017, the company had $625 million in system-wide revenue.

Along with traditional haircutting services, Sport Clips offers an "MVP Experience" that includes several high-end services such as massaging shampoo, neck and shoulder treatment, and a precision haircut with a custom scent.

== Charitable works ==
In 2016, Sport Clips donated $1.1 million to the St. Baldricks Foundation to support childhood cancer. In 2025, Sport Clips raised $1.33 million for student veterans, leading the organization to raise $18 million in donations. Sport Clips also supports major organizations such as the American Red Cross, Gratitude Initiative, and the VFW Foundation through its "Haircuts with Heart" program.
