= Regis Corporation =

American operator of hair salons

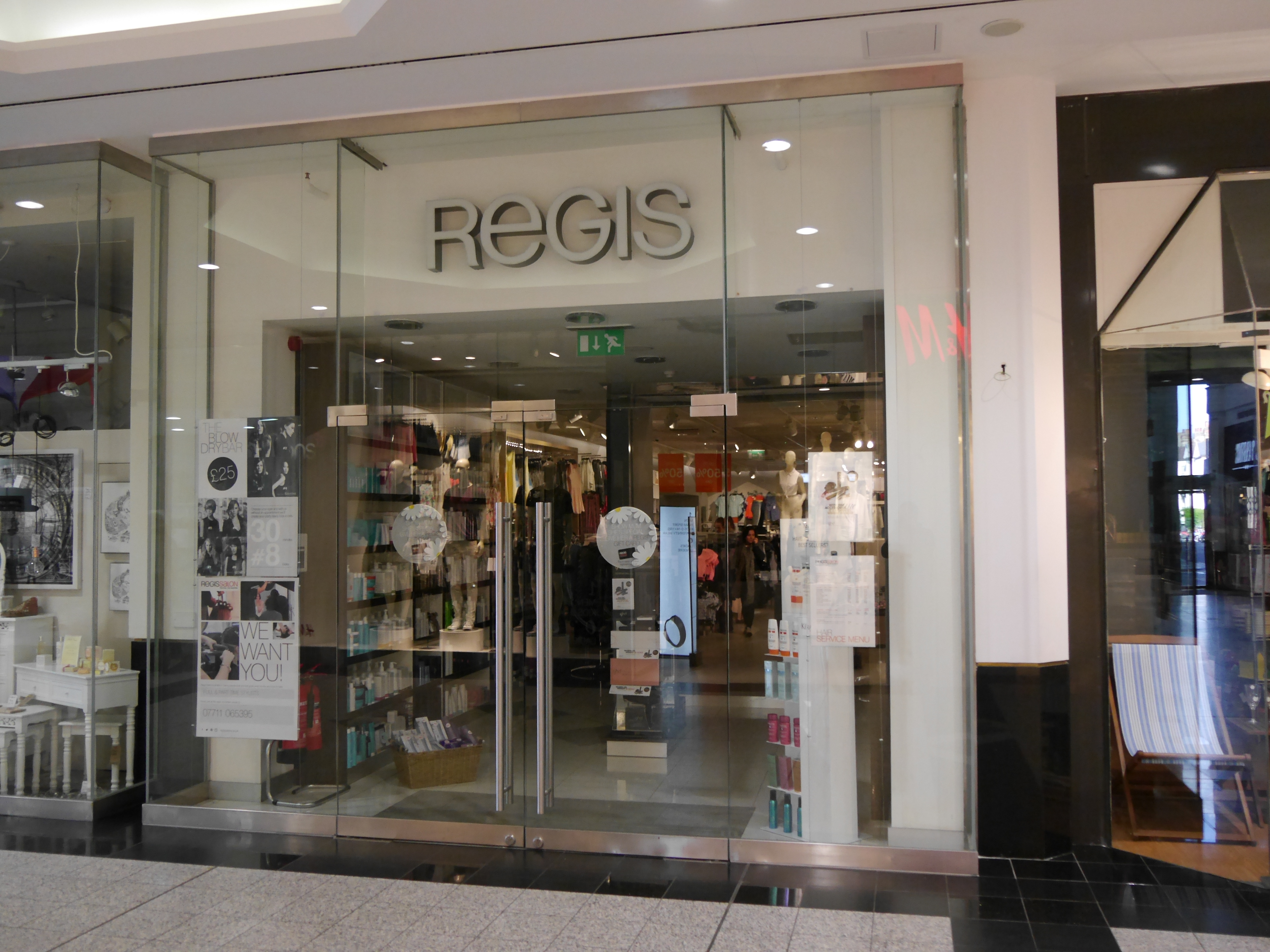
- Regis, Putney Exchange, London, England
- Formerly: Kunin Beauty Salon
- Type: Public
- Traded as: NYSE: RGS
- Industry: Hair salon retail chain, beauty services
- Founded: Edina, Minnesota, US (1922)
- Founders: Paul Kunin; Florence Kunin
- Headquarters: Minneapolis, Minnesota, US
- Number of locations: 5,839
- Key people: Matthew Doctor (CEO)
- Products: Hair cuts; Beauty products
- Brands: Best Cuts; BoRics Hair; Carlton Hair; City Looks; Cost Cutters; Empire Beauty Schools; Famous Hair; First Choice Haircutters; HairCrafters; HairMasters; Holiday Hair; Magicuts; MasterCuts; Regis Salons; Roosters Men's Grooming Center (Roosters); Sassoon Salons; Saturday's; SmartStyle; Style America; Supercuts; TGF Hair Salon
- Revenue: ▼US$1.69 billion (2017)
- Number of employees: 2,446 (June 2021)
- Website: www.regiscorp.com

Regis Corporation is an American operator of hair salons. As of August 2021, it has 5,563 franchised and 276 company-owned salons. Its headquarters are in Minneapolis, Minnesota.

The primary trade names Regis salons operates under are SmartStyle, Supercuts, Holiday Hair, Cost Cutters, First Choice Haircutters, Regis Salons, MasterCuts, Pro-Cuts, Famous Hair, and Roosters Men's Grooming Center.

== History ==
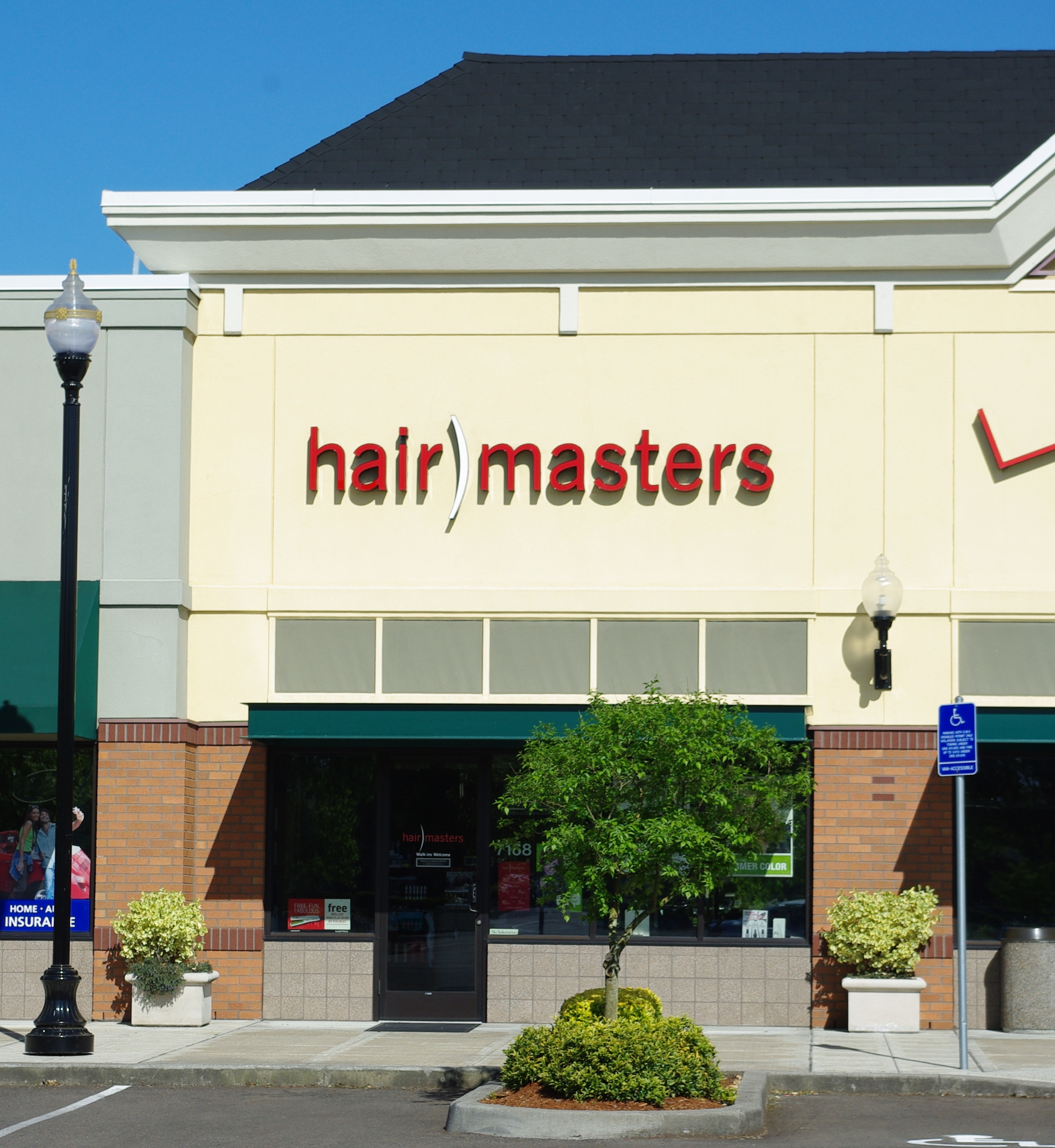
A HairMasters location in Hillsboro, Oregon

Regis was founded in 1922 by Paul and Florence Kunin as Kunin Beauty Salon. They sold it to their son Myron in 1958, who renamed the company Regis and moved its salons from department stores to shopping malls.

In 1982, the company introduced the Pro-Cuts brand, a value-priced salon for men and families. By the mid-1980s, the company had 500 salons in malls across middle America and hit $150 million annual sales in 1987.

Regis became a public company in 1991 and opened its headquarters in Edina, Minnesota in 1992. In December 1993, Regis acquired 88 salons from the Trade Secret Development Corporation for $12.8 million. The deal helped expand the company's business in the sale of hair and beauty supplies. By 1994, its upscale store chain Regis Hairstyles accounted for 64% of total sales. Mastercuts Family, meanwhile, accounted for 15% aggregate sales. Regis had 286 stores in Britain, Canada, South Africa, and Mexico.

In July 1996, Regis announced its intention to acquire SuperCuts in a stock swap valued at about $150 million. At the time, Regis had 1,950 hair care salons worldwide, while SuperCuts had 1,168 in the United States. This acquisition allowed Regis to expand into strip centers and street locations. SuperCuts UK remained independent until 2000, when the companies officially merged. By 1998, Regis operated 3,555 salons under the names Supercuts, MasterCuts, TradeSecret, and Regis, and topped the billion-dollar mark in revenue.

In 1999, the two largest publicly traded hair-salon companies merged when Regis acquired The Barbers, Hairstyling for Men & Women, Inc. for $58.7 million. Regis gained more than 4,600 salons and combined sales of nearly $1.5 billion. As part of the merger, the company acquired 199 salons operating as Cost Cutters in Wal-Mart stores, making Regis the primary provider of salon services in Wal-Marts. Family Hair Care, City Looks Salons International, and We Care Hair were also acquired.

In 2002, the Regis a Fortune 1000 company. In April, it acquired Jean Louis David, which owned 1,200 locations in France, Italy, Spain, Brazil, Belgium, Switzerland, Poland, and the US at the time. In July, it acquired 328 BoRics salons to increase its presence in the Chicago, Detroit and Pittsburgh markets. It also acquired 59 salons in Missouri, Kansas, Arizona and North Carolina in October and 25 Vidal Sassoon salons and four Vidal Sassoon beauty academies in December. The company assumed licensing agreements with Procter & Gamble to expand the Vidal Sassoon salon group brand name in North America, Britain and Germany.

In April 2004, Regis acquired 153 Holiday Hair salons based in Pennsylvania. In 2005, the company acquired Hair Club for Men and Women.

On January 10, 2006, Regis Corporation announced that, for $2.6 billion, it would acquire the Sally Beauty Company, which would be spun-off from Alberto-Culver. At the time, Sally Beauty operated 3,200 stores. However, on April 5, 2006, Alberto-Culver terminated the merger agreement and later Sally was spun off as a separate company. That same month, Regis acquired 105 Famous Hair, Chicago Hair, and Hair Inc. salons located in Ohio and four other states. By the end of the year, Regis had grown from 1,479 locations in 1994 to 11,333 company-owned and franchised salons, 54 beauty schools, and 90 Hair Club for Men and Women offices.

In October 2007, Regis signed a definitive agreement to merge its continental European franchise salon operations with the Franck Provost Salon Group. The combined entity became known as Provalliance Group, in which Regis maintained a 30% ownership share. The transaction took place in January 2008. In that same month, the company also announced the acquisition of 63 company-owned and 51 franchise PureBeauty and BeautyFirst salon operations across 20 states.

In 2010, Regis began looking for a buyer. In July, it spun-off Trade Secret, a shopping mall based hair care supply store. It later closed approximately 80 locations, filed for Chapter 11 Bankruptcy protection, and closed all stores. In October, the company announced it would redevelop its Pro-Cuts brand as a sports-themed salon for men to compete against Sports Clips. However, by 2015, this concept had mostly been abandoned. Hedge fund Starboard Value then invested in the company the following year, gaining three board seats and pushing out company leadership, before selling its shares in October 2013.

By February 2011, Regis had increased its share in Provaillance to 46%. However, due to the then-ongoing European debt crisis, the company divested its ownership share by the following year. It also sold off Hair Club to the Japanese wigmaker Aderans for $163.5 million in July. That same month, Regis acquired the Roosters Men’s Grooming Center franchise, which had 35 franchised salons in 15 states at the time.

By 2013, Regis had 8,000 corporate-owned and franchise salons, but by 2014, the company's sales had been in decline for six years. In October 2017 Regis Corporation sold much of its mall-based salon assets to The Beautiful Group. These salons became franchises keeping the same brand names. The transaction included 858 North America Regis Salons and MasterCuts locations, the intellectual property related to MasterCuts and other trade names, and 250 Regis Salons and Supercuts salons in the U.K. In 2018, the company announced plans to move its headquarters to Minneapolis, Minnesota. It also closed 597 SmartStyle salons.

In June 2019, Regis announced the sale of 96 California-based SuperCuts salons to Moxie Management Group. In May 2019, franchisee Super C Group acquired 190 Famous Hair, Best Cuts, Fiesta Salons, First Choice Haircutters, and BoRics Hair Care salons from Regis, converting them into Supercuts and Cost Cutters. In August, the company sold off 3,108 company-owned salons to franchisees. It also announced its plan to cut the company's 50 brands to just five: Supercuts, SmartStyle, Cost Cutters, First Choice Haircutters, and Roosters. At the end of December, Regis terminated its franchise agreements with The Beautiful Group and took back 200 salons with the stated intention of finding a new buyer. The remaining salons were to close.

In February 2020, Regis announced it had sold its interest in Empire Education Group back to EEG. When the COVID-19 pandemic hit in 2020, the company was in the middle of transitioning its salons corporate to franchise ownership. By the summer of 2022, Regis had not had a positive quarter since 2018 and was in danger of being delisted from the New York Stock Exchange. Regis exited the product distribution business and sold its salon technology platform Opensalon Pro, helping the business report a $2.5 million operating profit that November. In December 2024, Regis acquired Alline Salon Group, its biggest franchisee, for $22 million. The deal put 314 SuperCuts, Cost Cutters, and Holiday Hair salons in Michigan, Ohio, and Pennsylvania under direct control of the company.
